= 2010 ATP Challenger Tour =

Men's professional tennis circuit for the year 2010

Details
- Duration: 4 January 2010 – 28 November 2010
- Edition: 33rd (2nd under this name)
- Tournaments: 154

Achievements (singles)

The ATP Challenger Tour is the secondary professional tennis circuit organized by the ATP. The 2010 ATP Challenger Tour calendar comprises 13 top tier Tretorn SERIE+ tournaments, and approximately 150 regular series tournaments, with prize money ranging from $35,000 up to $150,000.

== Schedule ==
This is the complete schedule of events on the 2010 calendar, with player progression documented from the quarterfinals stage.

=== Key ===
Tretorn SERIE+ tournaments
Regular series tournaments

=== January ===
Week of	Tournament	Champions	Runners-up	Semifinalists	Quarterfinalists
January 4	2010 Internationaux de Nouvelle-Calédonie; Nouméa, New Caledonia, France; Regular series Hard – $75,000+H – 32S/10Q/16D; Singles – Doubles	(Germany) Florian Mayer; 6–3, 6–0	(Italy) Flavio Cipolla	(South Africa) Kevin Anderson (France) David Guez	(Italy) Simone Vagnozzi (Serbia) Ilija Bozoljac (Bulgaria) Grigor Dimitrov (Germany) Simon Stadler
January 4	2010 Internationaux de Nouvelle-Calédonie; Nouméa, New Caledonia, France; Regular series Hard – $75,000+H – 32S/10Q/16D; Singles – Doubles	(France) Nicolas Devilder (France) Édouard Roger-Vasselin; 5–7, 6–2, [10–8]	(Italy) Flavio Cipolla (Italy) Simone Vagnozzi	(South Africa) Kevin Anderson (France) David Guez	(Italy) Simone Vagnozzi (Serbia) Ilija Bozoljac (Bulgaria) Grigor Dimitrov (Germany) Simon Stadler
January 4	2010 Prime Cup Aberto de São Paulo; São Paulo, Brazil; Regular series Hard – $125,000+H – 32S/32Q/16D; Singles – Doubles	(Brazil) Ricardo Mello; 6–3, 6–1	(Argentina) Eduardo Schwank	(Brazil) Thiago Alves (Paraguay) Ramón Delgado	(Brazil) João Souza (United States) Michael McClune (Lithuania) Ričardas Berankis (Spain) Adrián Menéndez Maceiras
January 4	2010 Prime Cup Aberto de São Paulo; São Paulo, Brazil; Regular series Hard – $125,000+H – 32S/32Q/16D; Singles – Doubles	(Argentina) Brian Dabul (Argentina) Sebastián Prieto; 6–3, 6–3	(Poland) Tomasz Bednarek (Poland) Mateusz Kowalczyk	(Brazil) Thiago Alves (Paraguay) Ramón Delgado	(Brazil) João Souza (United States) Michael McClune (Lithuania) Ričardas Berankis (Spain) Adrián Menéndez Maceiras
January 11	2010 Challenger Salinas Diario Expreso; Salinas, Ecuador; Regular series Hard – $35,000+H – 32S/25Q/16D; Singles – Doubles	(Argentina) Brian Dabul; 6–3, 6–2	(Chile) Nicolás Massú	(Brazil) Caio Zampieri (Lithuania) Ričardas Berankis	(Brazil) João Souza (Slovenia) Luka Gregorc (Argentina) Diego Junqueira (Brazil) Rogério Dutra da Silva
January 11	2010 Challenger Salinas Diario Expreso; Salinas, Ecuador; Regular series Hard – $35,000+H – 32S/25Q/16D; Singles – Doubles	(United Kingdom) Jonathan Marray (United Kingdom) Jamie Murray; 6–3, 6–4	(Thailand) Sanchai Ratiwatana (Thailand) Sonchat Ratiwatana	(Brazil) Caio Zampieri (Lithuania) Ričardas Berankis	(Brazil) João Souza (Slovenia) Luka Gregorc (Argentina) Diego Junqueira (Brazil) Rogério Dutra da Silva
January 18	No tournaments scheduled.				
January 25	2010 Seguros Bolívar Open Bucaramanga; Bucaramanga, Colombia; Regular series Clay (red) – $35,000+H – 32S/18Q/16D; Singles – Doubles	(Argentina) Eduardo Schwank; 6–4, 6–2	(Argentina) Juan Pablo Brzezicki	(Colombia) Santiago Giraldo (Brazil) Thiago Alves	(Brazil) Ricardo Mello (Spain) Pere Riba (Romania) Victor Crivoi (Chile) Nicolás Massú
January 25	2010 Seguros Bolívar Open Bucaramanga; Bucaramanga, Colombia; Regular series Clay (red) – $35,000+H – 32S/18Q/16D; Singles – Doubles	(Spain) Pere Riba (Spain) Santiago Ventura; 6–2, 6–2	(Brazil) Marcelo Demoliner (Brazil) Rodrigo Guidolin	(Colombia) Santiago Giraldo (Brazil) Thiago Alves	(Brazil) Ricardo Mello (Spain) Pere Riba (Romania) Victor Crivoi (Chile) Nicolás Massú
January 25	2010 Intersport Heilbronn Open; Talheim, Germany; Regular series Hard (i) – €85,000+H – 32S/32Q/16D; Singles – Doubles	(Germany) Michael Berrer; 6–3, 7–6(4)	(Kazakhstan) Andrey Golubev	(Ukraine) Oleksandr Dolgopolov Jr. (France) Josselin Ouanna	(Germany) Tobias Kamke (Kazakhstan) Mikhail Kukushkin (Slovakia) Karol Beck (Slovakia) Dominik Hrbatý
January 25	2010 Intersport Heilbronn Open; Talheim, Germany; Regular series Hard (i) – €85,000+H – 32S/32Q/16D; Singles – Doubles	(Thailand) Sanchai Ratiwatana (Thailand) Sonchat Ratiwatana; 6–4, 7–5	(Croatia) Mario Ančić (Croatia) Lovro Zovko	(Ukraine) Oleksandr Dolgopolov Jr. (France) Josselin Ouanna	(Germany) Tobias Kamke (Kazakhstan) Mikhail Kukushkin (Slovakia) Karol Beck (Slovakia) Dominik Hrbatý
January 25	2010 Honolulu Challenger; Honolulu, United States; Regular series Hard – $50,000 – 32S/30Q/16D/3Q; Singles – Doubles	(United States) Michael Russell; 6–0, 6–3	(Slovenia) Grega Žemlja	(United States) Donald Young (South Africa) Kevin Anderson	(United States) Ryan Sweeting (United States) Robert Kendrick (United States) Lester Cook (United States) Kevin Kim
January 25	2010 Honolulu Challenger; Honolulu, United States; Regular series Hard – $50,000 – 32S/30Q/16D/3Q; Singles – Doubles	(South Africa) Kevin Anderson (United States) Ryler DeHeart; 3–6, 7–6(2), [15–13]	(South Korea) Im Kyu-tae (Austria) Martin Slanar	(United States) Donald Young (South Africa) Kevin Anderson	(United States) Ryan Sweeting (United States) Robert Kendrick (United States) Lester Cook (United States) Kevin Kim

=== February ===
Week of	Tournament	Champions	Runners-up	Semifinalists	Quarterfinalists
February 1	2010 McDonald's Burnie International; Burnie, Australia; Regular series Hard – $50,000 – 32S/25Q/16D; Singles – Doubles	(Australia) Bernard Tomic; 6–4, 6–2	(Australia) Greg Jones	(Australia) Joseph Sirianni (Japan) Yūichi Sugita	(Slovenia) Grega Žemlja (Canada) Pierre-Ludovic Duclos (Australia) John Millman (Australia) Dayne Kelly
February 1	2010 McDonald's Burnie International; Burnie, Australia; Regular series Hard – $50,000 – 32S/25Q/16D; Singles – Doubles	(Australia) Matthew Ebden (Australia) Samuel Groth; 6–7(8), 7–6(4), [10–8]	(Australia) James Lemke (Australia) Dane Propoggia	(Australia) Joseph Sirianni (Japan) Yūichi Sugita	(Slovenia) Grega Žemlja (Canada) Pierre-Ludovic Duclos (Australia) John Millman (Australia) Dayne Kelly
February 1	2010 Challenger of Dallas; Dallas, United States; Regular series Hard (i) – $50,000 – 32S/32Q/16D/4Q; Singles – Doubles	(United States) Ryan Sweeting; 6–4, 6–2	(Australia) Carsten Ball	(Paraguay) Ramón Delgado (United States) Michael Yani	(United States) Alex Bogomolov Jr. (United States) Bobby Reynolds (United States) Robert Kendrick (Italy) Marco Crugnola
February 1	2010 Challenger of Dallas; Dallas, United States; Regular series Hard (i) – $50,000 – 32S/32Q/16D/4Q; Singles – Doubles	(United States) Scott Lipsky (United States) David Martin; 7–6(7), 6–3	(Canada) Vasek Pospisil (Canada) Adil Shamasdin	(Paraguay) Ramón Delgado (United States) Michael Yani	(United States) Alex Bogomolov Jr. (United States) Bobby Reynolds (United States) Robert Kendrick (Italy) Marco Crugnola
February 1	2010 Kazan Kremlin Cup; Kazan, Russia; Regular series Hard (i) – $50,000 – 32S/30Q/16D; Singles – Doubles	(Poland) Michał Przysiężny; 7–6(5), 6–4	(Germany) Julian Reister	(Republic of Ireland) Conor Niland (Germany) Tobias Kamke	(Slovakia) Pavol Červenák (Russia) Konstantin Kravchuk (Kazakhstan) Yuri Schukin (Montenegro) Goran Tošić
February 1	2010 Kazan Kremlin Cup; Kazan, Russia; Regular series Hard (i) – $50,000 – 32S/30Q/16D; Singles – Doubles	(Czech Republic) Jan Mertl (Kazakhstan) Yuri Schukin; 6–2, 6–4	(Germany) Tobias Kamke (Germany) Julian Reister	(Republic of Ireland) Conor Niland (Germany) Tobias Kamke	(Slovakia) Pavol Červenák (Russia) Konstantin Kravchuk (Kazakhstan) Yuri Schukin (Montenegro) Goran Tošić
February 8	2010 Internazionali di Tennis di Bergamo Trofeo Trismoka; Bergamo, Italy; Regular series Hard (i) – €42,500+H – 32S/32Q/16D; Singles – Doubles	(Slovakia) Karol Beck; 6–4, 6–4	(Luxembourg) Gilles Müller	(Slovakia) Dominik Hrbatý (Jamaica) Dustin Brown	(Poland) Michał Przysiężny (Serbia) Ilija Bozoljac (Switzerland) Roman Valent (Croatia) Ivan Dodig
February 8	2010 Internazionali di Tennis di Bergamo Trofeo Trismoka; Bergamo, Italy; Regular series Hard (i) – €42,500+H – 32S/32Q/16D; Singles – Doubles	(United Kingdom) Jonathan Marray (United Kingdom) Jamie Murray; 1–6, 7–6(2), [10–8]	(Slovakia) Karol Beck (Czech Republic) Jiří Krkoška	(Slovakia) Dominik Hrbatý (Jamaica) Dustin Brown	(Poland) Michał Przysiężny (Serbia) Ilija Bozoljac (Switzerland) Roman Valent (Croatia) Ivan Dodig
February 15	2010 GEMAX Open; Belgrade, Serbia; Tretorn SERIE+ Carpet (i) – €106,500+H – 32S/32Q/16D; Singles – Doubles	(Slovakia) Karol Beck; 7–5, 7–6(4)	(Serbia) Ilija Bozoljac	(Serbia) Janko Tipsarević (United Kingdom) Alex Bogdanovic	(Czech Republic) Lukáš Rosol (Croatia) Roko Karanušić (Poland) Michał Przysiężny (Kazakhstan) Andrey Golubev
February 15	2010 GEMAX Open; Belgrade, Serbia; Tretorn SERIE+ Carpet (i) – €106,500+H – 32S/32Q/16D; Singles – Doubles	(Serbia) Ilija Bozoljac (United Kingdom) Jamie Delgado; 6–3, 6–3	(Jamaica) Dustin Brown (Austria) Martin Slanar	(Serbia) Janko Tipsarević (United Kingdom) Alex Bogdanovic	(Czech Republic) Lukáš Rosol (Croatia) Roko Karanušić (Poland) Michał Przysiężny (Kazakhstan) Andrey Golubev
February 15	2010 Morocco Tennis Tour – Tanger; Tanger, Morocco; Regular series Clay (red) – €30,000+H – 32S/32Q/16D; Singles – Doubles	(France) Stéphane Robert; 7–6(5), 6–4	(Ukraine) Oleksandr Dolgopolov Jr.	(Slovenia) Blaž Kavčič (Algeria) Lamine Ouahab	(Portugal) Rui Machado (Slovakia) Martin Kližan (Czech Republic) Dušan Lojda (Belgium) Steve Darcis
February 15	2010 Morocco Tennis Tour – Tanger; Tanger, Morocco; Regular series Clay (red) – €30,000+H – 32S/32Q/16D; Singles – Doubles	(Belgium) Steve Darcis (Germany) Dominik Meffert; 5–7, 7–5, [10–7]	(Belarus) Uladzimir Ignatik (Slovakia) Martin Kližan	(Slovenia) Blaž Kavčič (Algeria) Lamine Ouahab	(Portugal) Rui Machado (Slovakia) Martin Kližan (Czech Republic) Dušan Lojda (Belgium) Steve Darcis
February 22	2010 Morocco Tennis Tour – Meknes; Meknes, Morocco; Regular series Clay (red) – €30,000+H – 32S/29Q/16D; Singles – Doubles	(Ukraine) Oleksandr Dolgopolov Jr. 7–5, 6–2	(Portugal) Rui Machado	(Algeria) Lamine Ouahab (Spain) Pere Riba	(Spain) Pablo Carreño Busta (Spain) Iván Navarro (Spain) David Marrero (Croatia) Antonio Veić
February 22	2010 Morocco Tennis Tour – Meknes; Meknes, Morocco; Regular series Clay (red) – €30,000+H – 32S/29Q/16D; Singles – Doubles	(Spain) Pablo Andújar (Italy) Flavio Cipolla; 6–2, 6–2	(Ukraine) Oleksandr Dolgopolov Jr. (Ukraine) Artem Smirnov	(Algeria) Lamine Ouahab (Spain) Pere Riba	(Spain) Pablo Carreño Busta (Spain) Iván Navarro (Spain) David Marrero (Croatia) Antonio Veić

=== March ===
Week of	Tournament	Champions	Runners-up	Semifinalists	Quarterfinalists
March 1	2010 Challenger DCNS de Cherbourg; Cherbourg, France; Regular series Hard (i) – €42,500+H – 32S/32Q/16D; Singles – Doubles	(France) Nicolas Mahut; 6–4, 6–3	(Luxembourg) Gilles Müller	(France) Arnaud Clément (France) Josselin Ouanna	(France) Édouard Roger-Vasselin (France) Alexandre Sidorenko (Germany) Andre Begemann (France) Laurent Recouderc
March 1	2010 Challenger DCNS de Cherbourg; Cherbourg, France; Regular series Hard (i) – €42,500+H – 32S/32Q/16D; Singles – Doubles	(France) Nicolas Mahut (France) Édouard Roger-Vasselin; 6–2, 6–4	(India) Harsh Mankad (Canada) Adil Shamasdin	(France) Arnaud Clément (France) Josselin Ouanna	(France) Édouard Roger-Vasselin (France) Alexandre Sidorenko (Germany) Andre Begemann (France) Laurent Recouderc
March 8	2010 Japan Indoor Tennis Championships; Kyoto, Japan; Regular series Carpet (i) – $35,000+H – 32S/28Q/16D/3Q; Singles – Doubles	(Japan) Yūichi Sugita; 4–6, 6–4, 6–1	(Australia) Matthew Ebden	(Poland) Michał Przysiężny (Australia) Rameez Junaid	(Japan) Go Soeda (Germany) Andre Begemann (Japan) Tatsuma Ito (Australia) John Millman
March 8	2010 Japan Indoor Tennis Championships; Kyoto, Japan; Regular series Carpet (i) – $35,000+H – 32S/28Q/16D/3Q; Singles – Doubles	(Austria) Martin Fischer (Austria) Philipp Oswald; 6–1, 6–2	(India) Divij Sharan (India) Vishnu Vardhan	(Poland) Michał Przysiężny (Australia) Rameez Junaid	(Japan) Go Soeda (Germany) Andre Begemann (Japan) Tatsuma Ito (Australia) John Millman
March 8	2010 Morocco Tennis Tour – Rabat; Rabat, Morocco; Regular series Clay (red) (i) – €42,500+H – 32S/29Q/16D; Singles – Doubles	(Spain) Rubén Ramírez Hidalgo; 6–4, 6–4	(Spain) Marcel Granollers	(Portugal) Rui Machado (Germany) Bastian Knittel	(Serbia) Ilija Bozoljac (Spain) Iván Navarro (Slovenia) Blaž Kavčič (Spain) Adrián Menéndez Maceiras
March 8	2010 Morocco Tennis Tour – Rabat; Rabat, Morocco; Regular series Clay (red) (i) – €42,500+H – 32S/29Q/16D; Singles – Doubles	(Serbia) Ilija Bozoljac (Italy) Daniele Bracciali; 6–4, 6–4	(Ukraine) Oleksandr Dolgopolov Jr. (Russia) Dmitri Sitak	(Portugal) Rui Machado (Germany) Bastian Knittel	(Serbia) Ilija Bozoljac (Spain) Iván Navarro (Slovenia) Blaž Kavčič (Spain) Adrián Menéndez Maceiras
March 8	2010 BH Telecom Indoors; Sarajevo, Bosnia and Herzegovina; Regular series Hard (i) – €30,000+H – 32S/22Q/16D; Singles – Doubles	(France) Édouard Roger-Vasselin; 6–7(5), 6–3, 1–0, ret.	(Slovakia) Karol Beck	(Croatia) Ivan Dodig (Germany) Tobias Kamke	(United Kingdom) Alex Bogdanovic (Bosnia and Herzegovina) Ismar Gorčić (Netherlands) Matwé Middelkoop (Italy) Stefano Galvani
March 8	2010 BH Telecom Indoors; Sarajevo, Bosnia and Herzegovina; Regular series Hard (i) – €30,000+H – 32S/22Q/16D; Singles – Doubles	(France) Nicolas Mahut (France) Édouard Roger-Vasselin; 7–6(6), 6–7(7), [10–5]	(Croatia) Ivan Dodig (Czech Republic) Lukáš Rosol	(Croatia) Ivan Dodig (Germany) Tobias Kamke	(United Kingdom) Alex Bogdanovic (Bosnia and Herzegovina) Ismar Gorčić (Netherlands) Matwé Middelkoop (Italy) Stefano Galvani
March 15	2010 Città di Caltanissetta; Caltanissetta, Italy; Regular series Clay (red) – €42,500+H – 32S/30Q/16D; Singles – Doubles	(Netherlands) Robin Haase; 7–5, 6–3	(Italy) Matteo Trevisan	(Slovenia) Grega Žemlja (Spain) Iván Navarro	(Croatia) Antonio Veić (Spain) Pere Riba (Argentina) Martín Alund (Italy) Paolo Lorenzi
March 15	2010 Città di Caltanissetta; Caltanissetta, Italy; Regular series Clay (red) – €42,500+H – 32S/30Q/16D; Singles – Doubles	(Spain) David Marrero (Spain) Santiago Ventura; 7–6(3), 6–4	(Belarus) Uladzimir Ignatik (Slovakia) Martin Kližan	(Slovenia) Grega Žemlja (Spain) Iván Navarro	(Croatia) Antonio Veić (Spain) Pere Riba (Argentina) Martín Alund (Italy) Paolo Lorenzi
March 15	2010 Morocco Tennis Tour – Marrakech; Marrakesh, Morocco; Regular series Clay (red) – €106,500+H – 32S/27Q/16D; Singles – Doubles	(Finland) Jarkko Nieminen; 6–3, 6–2	(Ukraine) Oleksandr Dolgopolov Jr.	(Kazakhstan) Mikhail Kukushkin (Spain) Marcel Granollers	(Serbia) Ilija Bozoljac (France) Laurent Recouderc (Italy) Flavio Cipolla (Algeria) Lamine Ouahab
March 15	2010 Morocco Tennis Tour – Marrakech; Marrakesh, Morocco; Regular series Clay (red) – €106,500+H – 32S/27Q/16D; Singles – Doubles	(Serbia) Ilija Bozoljac (Romania) Horia Tecău; 6–1, 6–1	(United States) James Cerretani (Canada) Adil Shamasdin	(Kazakhstan) Mikhail Kukushkin (Spain) Marcel Granollers	(Serbia) Ilija Bozoljac (France) Laurent Recouderc (Italy) Flavio Cipolla (Algeria) Lamine Ouahab
March 15	2010 BMW Tennis Championship; Sunrise, United States; Regular series Hard – $125,000+H – 32S/32Q/16D; Singles – Doubles	(Germany) Florian Mayer; 6–4, 6–4	(France) Gilles Simon	(Argentina) Leonardo Mayer (Colombia) Santiago Giraldo	(Germany) Michael Berrer (Austria) Stefan Koubek (Germany) Benjamin Becker (Czech Republic) Jan Hájek
March 15	2010 BMW Tennis Championship; Sunrise, United States; Regular series Hard – $125,000+H – 32S/32Q/16D; Singles – Doubles	(Czech Republic) Martin Damm (Slovakia) Filip Polášek; 4–6, 6–1, [13–11]	(Czech Republic) Lukáš Dlouhý (India) Leander Paes	(Argentina) Leonardo Mayer (Colombia) Santiago Giraldo	(Germany) Michael Berrer (Austria) Stefan Koubek (Germany) Benjamin Becker (Czech Republic) Jan Hájek
March 22	2010 Open Barletta; Barletta, Italy; Regular series Clay (red) – €42,500+H – 32S/31Q/16D; Singles – Doubles	(Spain) Pere Riba; 6–3, ret.	(Belgium) Steve Darcis	(Italy) Simone Bolelli (Argentina) Martín Vassallo Argüello	(Finland) Jarkko Nieminen (Slovenia) Blaž Kavčič (Russia) Igor Kunitsyn (Spain) Albert Ramos Viñolas
March 22	2010 Open Barletta; Barletta, Italy; Regular series Clay (red) – €42,500+H – 32S/31Q/16D; Singles – Doubles	(Spain) David Marrero (Spain) Santiago Ventura; 6–3, 6–3	(Serbia) Ilija Bozoljac (Italy) Daniele Bracciali	(Italy) Simone Bolelli (Argentina) Martín Vassallo Argüello	(Finland) Jarkko Nieminen (Slovenia) Blaž Kavčič (Russia) Igor Kunitsyn (Spain) Albert Ramos Viñolas
March 22	2010 The Jersey International; Jersey, Great Britain; Regular series Hard (i) – €42,500 – 32S/22Q/16D; Singles – Doubles	(Czech Republic) Jan Hernych; 7–6(3), 6–4	(Czech Republic) Jan Minář	(Belgium) Yannick Mertens (Netherlands) Igor Sijsling	(Austria) Philipp Oswald (Republic of Ireland) Conor Niland (Ukraine) Sergei Bubka (Spain) Roberto Bautista Agut
March 22	2010 The Jersey International; Jersey, Great Britain; Regular series Hard (i) – €42,500 – 32S/22Q/16D; Singles – Doubles	(India) Rohan Bopanna (United Kingdom) Ken Skupski; 6–2, 2–6, [10–6]	(United Kingdom) Jonathan Marray (United Kingdom) Jamie Murray	(Belgium) Yannick Mertens (Netherlands) Igor Sijsling	(Austria) Philipp Oswald (Republic of Ireland) Conor Niland (Ukraine) Sergei Bubka (Spain) Roberto Bautista Agut
March 22	2010 Challenger Banque Nationale; Rimouski, Canada; Regular series Hard (i) – $35,000 – 32S/22Q/16D; Singles – Doubles	(South Africa) Rik de Voest; 6–0, 7–5	(United States) Tim Smyczek	(Poland) Michał Przysiężny (Canada) Érik Chvojka	(United States) Lester Cook (India) Prakash Amritraj (Austria) Martin Slanar (Australia) Nick Lindahl
March 22	2010 Challenger Banque Nationale; Rimouski, Canada; Regular series Hard (i) – $35,000 – 32S/22Q/16D; Singles – Doubles	(Australia) Kaden Hensel (Australia) Adam Hubble; 7–6(5), 3–6, [11–9]	(United States) Scott Lipsky (United States) David Martin	(Poland) Michał Przysiężny (Canada) Érik Chvojka	(United States) Lester Cook (India) Prakash Amritraj (Austria) Martin Slanar (Australia) Nick Lindahl
March 29	2010 Tennis Napoli Cup; Naples, Italy; Regular series Clay (red) – €30,000+H – 32S/32Q/16D; Singles – Doubles	(Portugal) Rui Machado; 6–4, 6–4	(Argentina) Federico Delbonis	(Chile) Adrián García (Kazakhstan) Andrey Golubev	(Czech Republic) Ivo Minář (Spain) Albert Ramos Viñolas (Italy) Filippo Volandri (Argentina) Diego Junqueira
March 29	2010 Tennis Napoli Cup; Naples, Italy; Regular series Clay (red) – €30,000+H – 32S/32Q/16D; Singles – Doubles	(Jamaica) Dustin Brown (United States) Jesse Witten; 7–6(4), 7–5	(India) Rohan Bopanna (Pakistan) Aisam-ul-Haq Qureshi	(Chile) Adrián García (Kazakhstan) Andrey Golubev	(Czech Republic) Ivo Minář (Spain) Albert Ramos Viñolas (Italy) Filippo Volandri (Argentina) Diego Junqueira
March 29	2010 Open Prévadiès Saint–Brieuc; Saint-Brieuc, France; Regular series Clay (red) (i) – €30,000+H – 32S/20Q/13D; Singles – Doubles	(Poland) Michał Przysiężny; 4–6, 6–2, 6–3	(Spain) Rubén Ramírez Hidalgo	(Australia) Samuel Groth (Russia) Teymuraz Gabashvili	(France) Benoît Paire (France) Josselin Ouanna (France) Charles-Antoine Brézac (France) Thierry Ascione
March 29	2010 Open Prévadiès Saint–Brieuc; Saint-Brieuc, France; Regular series Clay (red) (i) – €30,000+H – 32S/20Q/13D; Singles – Doubles	(Belarus) Uladzimir Ignatik (Spain) David Marrero; 4–6, 6–4, [10–5]	(United States) Brian Battistone (United States) Ryler DeHeart	(Australia) Samuel Groth (Russia) Teymuraz Gabashvili	(France) Benoît Paire (France) Josselin Ouanna (France) Charles-Antoine Brézac (France) Thierry Ascione

=== April ===
Week of	Tournament	Champions	Runners-up	Semifinalists	Quarterfinalists
April 5	2010 Bancolombia Open; Bogotá, Colombia; Regular series Clay (red) (i) – $125,000+H – 32S/32Q/16D; Singles – Doubles	(Brazil) João Souza; 4–6, 6–4, 6–1	(Colombia) Alejandro Falla	(Colombia) Juan Sebastián Cabal (Colombia) Santiago Giraldo	(Mexico) Santiago González (Brazil) Ricardo Mello (Italy) Paolo Lorenzi (Ecuador) Giovanni Lapentti
April 5	2010 Bancolombia Open; Bogotá, Colombia; Regular series Clay (red) (i) – $125,000+H – 32S/32Q/16D; Singles – Doubles	(Brazil) Franco Ferreiro (Mexico) Santiago González; 6–3, 5–7, [10–7]	(Germany) Dominik Meffert (Austria) Philipp Oswald	(Colombia) Juan Sebastián Cabal (Colombia) Santiago Giraldo	(Mexico) Santiago González (Brazil) Ricardo Mello (Italy) Paolo Lorenzi (Ecuador) Giovanni Lapentti
April 5	2010 Mitsubishi Electric Cup; Monza, Italy; Regular series Clay (red) (i) – €30,000+H – 32S/32Q/16D; Singles – Doubles	(Germany) Daniel Brands; 6–7(4), 6–3, 6–4	(Spain) Pablo Andújar	(Belgium) Christophe Rochus (Spain) Pere Riba	(Italy) Matteo Trevisan (Romania) Victor Crivoi (Argentina) Martín Vassallo Argüello (Italy) Francesco Aldi
April 5	2010 Mitsubishi Electric Cup; Monza, Italy; Regular series Clay (red) (i) – €30,000+H – 32S/32Q/16D; Singles – Doubles	(Italy) Daniele Bracciali (Spain) David Marrero; 6–3, 6–3	(Austria) Martin Fischer (Denmark) Frederik Nielsen	(Belgium) Christophe Rochus (Spain) Pere Riba	(Italy) Matteo Trevisan (Romania) Victor Crivoi (Argentina) Martín Vassallo Argüello (Italy) Francesco Aldi
April 12	2010 Baton Rouge Pro Tennis Classic; Baton Rouge, United States; Regular series Hard (i) – $50,000 – 32S/21Q/16D/4D; Singles – Doubles	(South Africa) Kevin Anderson; 6–7(7), 7–6(7), 6–1	(Germany) Tobias Kamke	(United States) Ryan Sweeting (Japan) Go Soeda	(Japan) Kei Nishikori (Australia) Nick Lindahl (United States) Alex Kuznetsov (United States) Robert Kendrick
April 12	2010 Baton Rouge Pro Tennis Classic; Baton Rouge, United States; Regular series Hard (i) – $50,000 – 32S/21Q/16D/4D; Singles – Doubles	(Australia) Stephen Huss (Australia) Joseph Sirianni; 1–6, 6–2, [13–11]	(Australia) Chris Guccione (Germany) Frank Moser	(United States) Ryan Sweeting (Japan) Go Soeda	(Japan) Kei Nishikori (Australia) Nick Lindahl (United States) Alex Kuznetsov (United States) Robert Kendrick
April 12	2010 Aberto Santa Catarina de Tenis; Blumenau, Brazil; Regular series Clay (red) (i) – $35,000+H – 32S/32Q/16D; Singles – Doubles	(Brazil) Marcos Daniel; 7–5, 6–7(5), 6–4	(Germany) Bastian Knittel	(Argentina) Diego Junqueira (Brazil) Júlio Silva	(Chile) Nicolás Massú (Argentina) Carlos Berlocq (Morocco) Reda El Amrani (Spain) Guillermo Alcaide
April 12	2010 Aberto Santa Catarina de Tenis; Blumenau, Brazil; Regular series Clay (red) (i) – $35,000+H – 32S/32Q/16D; Singles – Doubles	(Brazil) Franco Ferreiro (Brazil) André Sá; 6–4, 6–3	(Brazil) André Ghem (Italy) Simone Vagnozzi	(Argentina) Diego Junqueira (Brazil) Júlio Silva	(Chile) Nicolás Massú (Argentina) Carlos Berlocq (Morocco) Reda El Amrani (Spain) Guillermo Alcaide
April 12	2010 Soweto Open; Johannesburg, South Africa; Regular series Hard (i) – $100,000+H – 32S/26Q/16D; Singles – Doubles	(Jamaica) Dustin Brown; 7–6(2), 6–3	(South Africa) Izak van der Merwe	(Switzerland) Stéphane Bohli (Austria) Alexander Peya	(Netherlands) Raemon Sluiter (France) Nicolas Mahut (Luxembourg) Gilles Müller (New Zealand) Daniel King-Turner
April 12	2010 Soweto Open; Johannesburg, South Africa; Regular series Hard (i) – $100,000+H – 32S/26Q/16D; Singles – Doubles	(France) Nicolas Mahut (Croatia) Lovro Zovko; 6–2, 6–2	(South Africa) Raven Klaasen (South Africa) Izak van der Merwe	(Switzerland) Stéphane Bohli (Austria) Alexander Peya	(Netherlands) Raemon Sluiter (France) Nicolas Mahut (Luxembourg) Gilles Müller (New Zealand) Daniel King-Turner
April 12	2010 Abierto Internacional del Bicentenario Leon; León, Guanajuato, Mexico; Regular series Hard (i) – $35,000+H – 32S/32Q/16D; Singles – Doubles	(Mexico) Santiago González; 3–6, 6–1, 7–5	(Poland) Michał Przysiężny	(Dominican Republic) Víctor Estrella (Australia) Greg Jones	(South Korea) Im Kyu-tae (Switzerland) Roman Valent (India) Prakash Amritraj (United States) Lester Cook
April 12	2010 Abierto Internacional del Bicentenario Leon; León, Guanajuato, Mexico; Regular series Hard (i) – $35,000+H – 32S/32Q/16D; Singles – Doubles	(Mexico) Santiago González (Canada) Vasek Pospisil; 3–6, 6–3, [10–8]	(Australia) Kaden Hensel (Australia) Adam Hubble	(Dominican Republic) Víctor Estrella (Australia) Greg Jones	(South Korea) Im Kyu-tae (Switzerland) Roman Valent (India) Prakash Amritraj (United States) Lester Cook
April 12	2010 Seguros Bolívar Open Pereira; Pereira, Colombia; Regular series Hard (i) – $35,000+H – 32S/30Q/16D; Singles – Doubles	(Colombia) Santiago Giraldo; 6–3, 6–3	(Italy) Paolo Lorenzi	(Portugal) Leonardo Tavares (Colombia) Carlos Salamanca	(Spain) Arnau Brugués Davi (France) Jonathan Dasnières de Veigy (Germany) Dominik Meffert (Argentina) Facundo Bagnis
April 12	2010 Seguros Bolívar Open Pereira; Pereira, Colombia; Regular series Hard (i) – $35,000+H – 32S/30Q/16D; Singles – Doubles	(Germany) Dominik Meffert (Austria) Philipp Oswald; 6–7(4), 7–6(6), [10–5]	(Germany) Gero Kretschmer (Germany) Alex Satschko	(Portugal) Leonardo Tavares (Colombia) Carlos Salamanca	(Spain) Arnau Brugués Davi (France) Jonathan Dasnières de Veigy (Germany) Dominik Meffert (Argentina) Facundo Bagnis
April 12	2010 Rai Open; Rome, Italy; Regular series Clay (red) (i) – €30,000+H – 32S/32Q/16D; Singles – Doubles	(Italy) Filippo Volandri; 6–4, 7–5	(Algeria) Lamine Ouahab	(Kazakhstan) Yuri Schukin (Netherlands) Jesse Huta Galung	(Argentina) Federico Delbonis (Netherlands) Robin Haase (Belgium) Christophe Rochus (Croatia) Franko Škugor
April 12	2010 Rai Open; Rome, Italy; Regular series Clay (red) (i) – €30,000+H – 32S/32Q/16D; Singles – Doubles	(Poland) Tomasz Bednarek (Poland) Mateusz Kowalczyk; 6–4, 7–6(4)	(South Africa) Jeff Coetzee (United States) Jesse Witten	(Kazakhstan) Yuri Schukin (Netherlands) Jesse Huta Galung	(Argentina) Federico Delbonis (Netherlands) Robin Haase (Belgium) Christophe Rochus (Croatia) Franko Škugor
April 19	2010 Status Athens Open; Athens, Greece; Regular series Hard (i) – €85,000+H – 32S/32Q/16D; Singles – Doubles	(Chinese Taipei) Lu Yen-hsun; 3–6, 7–6(4), 6–4	(Germany) Rainer Schüttler	(Luxembourg) Gilles Müller (Israel) Dudi Sela	(Japan) Yūichi Sugita (Serbia) Ilija Bozoljac (Switzerland) Marco Chiudinelli (Germany) Björn Phau
April 19	2010 Status Athens Open; Athens, Greece; Regular series Hard (i) – €85,000+H – 32S/32Q/16D; Singles – Doubles	(South Africa) Rik de Voest (Chinese Taipei) Lu Yen-hsun; 6–3, 6–4	(Netherlands) Robin Haase (Netherlands) Igor Sijsling	(Luxembourg) Gilles Müller (Israel) Dudi Sela	(Japan) Yūichi Sugita (Serbia) Ilija Bozoljac (Switzerland) Marco Chiudinelli (Germany) Björn Phau
April 19	2010 Brazil Open Series; Curitiba, Brazil; Regular series Clay (red) (i) – $35,000+H – 32S/28Q/16D; Singles – Doubles	(Germany) Dominik Meffert; 6–4, 6–7(3), 6–2	(Brazil) Ricardo Mello	(Brazil) Marcos Daniel (Brazil) Thiago Alves	(Argentina) Diego Junqueira (Spain) Guillermo Alcaide (Brazil) Caio Zampieri (Uruguay) Marcel Felder
April 19	2010 Brazil Open Series; Curitiba, Brazil; Regular series Clay (red) (i) – $35,000+H – 32S/28Q/16D; Singles – Doubles	(Germany) Dominik Meffert (Portugal) Leonardo Tavares; 3–6, 6–2, [10–2]	(Paraguay) Ramón Delgado (Brazil) André Sá	(Brazil) Marcos Daniel (Brazil) Thiago Alves	(Argentina) Diego Junqueira (Spain) Guillermo Alcaide (Brazil) Caio Zampieri (Uruguay) Marcel Felder
April 19	2010 Roma Open; Rome, Italy; Regular series Clay (red) (i) – €30,000+H – 32S/32Q/16D; Singles – Doubles	(Argentina) Federico Delbonis; 6–4, 6–3	(Germany) Florian Mayer	(Spain) Rubén Ramírez Hidalgo (Portugal) Rui Machado	(Romania) Adrian Ungur (Italy) Filippo Volandri (Austria) Daniel Köllerer (Germany) Daniel Brands
April 19	2010 Roma Open; Rome, Italy; Regular series Clay (red) (i) – €30,000+H – 32S/32Q/16D; Singles – Doubles	(Croatia) Mario Ančić (Croatia) Ivan Dodig; 4–6, 7–6(8), [10–4]	(Argentina) Juan Pablo Brzezicki (Spain) Rubén Ramírez Hidalgo	(Spain) Rubén Ramírez Hidalgo (Portugal) Rui Machado	(Romania) Adrian Ungur (Italy) Filippo Volandri (Austria) Daniel Köllerer (Germany) Daniel Brands
April 19	2010 Tallahassee Tennis Challenger; Tallahassee, United States; Regular series Hard – $50,000 – 32S/32Q/16D/4Q; Singles – Doubles	(Argentina) Brian Dabul; 4–6, 4–0, Ret.	(United States) Robby Ginepri	(United States) Rajeev Ram (United States) Alex Kuznetsov	(United States) Ryan Sweeting (Japan) Kei Nishikori (Australia) Carsten Ball (Australia) Nick Lindahl
April 19	2010 Tallahassee Tennis Challenger; Tallahassee, United States; Regular series Hard – $50,000 – 32S/32Q/16D/4Q; Singles – Doubles	(Australia) Stephen Huss (Australia) Joseph Sirianni; 6–2, 6–4	(United States) Robert Kendrick (United States) Bobby Reynolds	(United States) Rajeev Ram (United States) Alex Kuznetsov	(United States) Ryan Sweeting (Japan) Kei Nishikori (Australia) Carsten Ball (Australia) Nick Lindahl
April 26	2010 Manta Open – Trofeo Ricardo Delgado Aray; Manta, Ecuador; Regular series Hard (i) – $35,000+H – 32S/23Q/15D; Singles – Doubles	(Japan) Go Soeda; 7–6(5), 6–2	(United States) Ryler DeHeart	(Brazil) Ricardo Hocevar (South Korea) Im Kyu-tae	(United Kingdom) James Ward (Australia) Joseph Sirianni (Spain) Arnau Brugués Davi (Italy) Riccardo Ghedin
April 26	2010 Manta Open – Trofeo Ricardo Delgado Aray; Manta, Ecuador; Regular series Hard (i) – $35,000+H – 32S/23Q/15D; Singles – Doubles	(United States) Ryler DeHeart (Canada) Pierre-Ludovic Duclos; 6–4, 7–5	(Germany) Martin Emmrich (Sweden) Andreas Siljeström	(Brazil) Ricardo Hocevar (South Korea) Im Kyu-tae	(United Kingdom) James Ward (Australia) Joseph Sirianni (Spain) Arnau Brugués Davi (Italy) Riccardo Ghedin
April 26	2010 Prosperita Open; Ostrava, Czech Republic; Regular series Clay (red) (i) – €42,500 – 32S/32Q/16D; Singles – Doubles	(Czech Republic) Lukáš Rosol; 7–5, 4–6, 7–6(4)	(Croatia) Ivan Dodig	(Croatia) Antonio Veić (Czech Republic) Pavel Šnobel	(Spain) Roberto Bautista Agut (Austria) Martin Fischer (Hungary) Attila Balázs (Czech Republic) Ivo Minář
April 26	2010 Prosperita Open; Ostrava, Czech Republic; Regular series Clay (red) (i) – €42,500 – 32S/32Q/16D; Singles – Doubles	(Austria) Martin Fischer (Austria) Philipp Oswald; 2–6, 7–6(6), [10–8]	(Poland) Tomasz Bednarek (Poland) Mateusz Kowalczyk	(Croatia) Antonio Veić (Czech Republic) Pavel Šnobel	(Spain) Roberto Bautista Agut (Austria) Martin Fischer (Hungary) Attila Balázs (Czech Republic) Ivo Minář
April 26	2010 Ixian Grand Aegean Tennis Cup; Rhodes, Greece; Regular Series; Hard (i) – €85,000+H – 32S/23Q/16D; Singles – Doubles	(Israel) Dudi Sela; 7–6(3), 6–3	(Germany) Rainer Schüttler	(Netherlands) Igor Sijsling (Chinese Taipei) Lu Yen-hsun	(France) Nicolas Mahut (Finland) Henri Kontinen (Germany) Simon Stadler (Luxembourg) Gilles Müller
April 26	2010 Ixian Grand Aegean Tennis Cup; Rhodes, Greece; Regular Series; Hard (i) – €85,000+H – 32S/23Q/16D; Singles – Doubles	(Jamaica) Dustin Brown (Germany) Simon Stadler; 7–6(4), 6–7(4), [10–7]	(United Kingdom) Jonathan Marray (United Kingdom) Jamie Murray	(Netherlands) Igor Sijsling (Chinese Taipei) Lu Yen-hsun	(France) Nicolas Mahut (Finland) Henri Kontinen (Germany) Simon Stadler (Luxembourg) Gilles Müller
April 26	2010 Tunis Open; Tunis, Tunisia; Tretorn SERIE+ Clay (red) (i) – $125,000+H – 32S/32Q/16D; Singles – Doubles	(Argentina) José Acasuso; 6–3, 6–4	(Germany) Daniel Brands	(Portugal) Frederico Gil (Belgium) Kristof Vliegen	(France) Édouard Roger-Vasselin (France) Vincent Millot (Algeria) Lamine Ouahab (Turkey) Marsel İlhan
April 26	2010 Tunis Open; Tunis, Tunisia; Tretorn SERIE+ Clay (red) (i) – $125,000+H – 32S/32Q/16D; Singles – Doubles	(South Africa) Jeff Coetzee (Belgium) Kristof Vliegen; 7–6(3), 6–3	(United States) James Cerretani (Canada) Adil Shamasdin	(Portugal) Frederico Gil (Belgium) Kristof Vliegen	(France) Édouard Roger-Vasselin (France) Vincent Millot (Algeria) Lamine Ouahab (Turkey) Marsel İlhan

=== May ===
Week of	Tournament	Champions	Runners-up	Semifinalists	Quarterfinalists
May 3	2010 Israel Open; Ramat HaSharon, Israel; Tretorn SERIE+ Hard – $100,000 – 32S/32Q/16D; Singles – Doubles	(Republic of Ireland) Conor Niland; 5–7, 7–6(5), 6–3	(Brazil) Thiago Alves	(Turkey) Marsel İlhan (Germany) Denis Gremelmayr	(Israel) Dudi Sela (Lithuania) Ričardas Berankis (Israel) Harel Levy (Austria) Stefan Koubek
May 3	2010 Israel Open; Ramat HaSharon, Israel; Tretorn SERIE+ Hard – $100,000 – 32S/32Q/16D; Singles – Doubles	(Israel) Jonathan Erlich (Israel) Andy Ram; 6–4, 6–3	(Austria) Alexander Peya (Germany) Simon Stadler	(Turkey) Marsel İlhan (Germany) Denis Gremelmayr	(Israel) Dudi Sela (Lithuania) Ričardas Berankis (Israel) Harel Levy (Austria) Stefan Koubek
May 3	2010 Palm Hills International Tennis Challenger; Cairo, Egypt; Regular series Clay (red) – $35,000 – 32S/32Q/16D; Singles – Doubles	(Czech Republic) Ivo Minář; 3–6, 6–2, 6–3	(Italy) Simone Vagnozzi	(Spain) Guillermo Olaso (Belgium) Christophe Rochus	(Germany) Bastian Knittel (Spain) Gabriel Trujillo Soler (Egypt) Sherif Sabry (France) Jonathan Dasnières de Veigy
May 3	2010 Palm Hills International Tennis Challenger; Cairo, Egypt; Regular series Clay (red) – $35,000 – 32S/32Q/16D; Singles – Doubles	(Austria) Martin Slanar (Italy) Simone Vagnozzi; 6–3, 6–4	(Germany) Andre Begemann (Jamaica) Dustin Brown	(Spain) Guillermo Olaso (Belgium) Christophe Rochus	(Germany) Bastian Knittel (Spain) Gabriel Trujillo Soler (Egypt) Sherif Sabry (France) Jonathan Dasnières de Veigy
May 3	2010 Sanremo Tennis Cup; Sanremo, Italy; Regular series Clay (red) – €30,000 – 32S/32Q/16D; Singles – Doubles	(Argentina) Gastón Gaudio; 7–5, 6–0	(Argentina) Martín Vassallo Argüello	(Russia) Teymuraz Gabashvili (Spain) Albert Ramos Viñolas	(France) Laurent Recouderc (Monaco) Benjamin Balleret (Argentina) Diego Junqueira (Argentina) Juan-Martín Aranguren
May 3	2010 Sanremo Tennis Cup; Sanremo, Italy; Regular series Clay (red) – €30,000 – 32S/32Q/16D; Singles – Doubles	(Argentina) Diego Junqueira (Argentina) Martín Vassallo Argüello; 2–6, 6–4, [10–8]	(Argentina) Carlos Berlocq (Argentina) Sebastián Decoud	(Russia) Teymuraz Gabashvili (Spain) Albert Ramos Viñolas	(France) Laurent Recouderc (Monaco) Benjamin Balleret (Argentina) Diego Junqueira (Argentina) Juan-Martín Aranguren
May 3	2010 Tail Savannah Challenger; Savannah, United States; Regular series Clay (red) – $50,000 – 32S/32Q/16D; Singles – Doubles	(Japan) Kei Nishikori; 6–4, 6–0	(United States) Ryan Sweeting	(Australia) Joseph Sirianni (United States) Donald Young	(Chile) Paul Capdeville (United States) Robert Kendrick (Slovenia) Luka Gregorc (Romania) Cătălin Gârd
May 3	2010 Tail Savannah Challenger; Savannah, United States; Regular series Clay (red) – $50,000 – 32S/32Q/16D; Singles – Doubles	(United Kingdom) Jamie Baker (United Kingdom) James Ward; 6–3, 6–4	(United States) Bobby Reynolds (South Africa) Fritz Wolmarans	(Australia) Joseph Sirianni (United States) Donald Young	(Chile) Paul Capdeville (United States) Robert Kendrick (Slovenia) Luka Gregorc (Romania) Cătălin Gârd
May 10	2010 Canella Challenger; Biella, Italy; Regular series Clay (red) – €30,000 – 32S/32Q/16D; Singles – Doubles	(Germany) Björn Phau; 6–4, 6–2	(Italy) Simone Bolelli	(Russia) Teymuraz Gabashvili (Germany) Dieter Kindlmann	(Argentina) Juan Pablo Brzezicki (Italy) Paolo Lorenzi (Belgium) Yannick Mertens (Spain) Pablo Andújar
May 10	2010 Canella Challenger; Biella, Italy; Regular series Clay (red) – €30,000 – 32S/32Q/16D; Singles – Doubles	(United States) James Cerretani (Canada) Adil Shamasdin; 6–3, 2–6, [11–9]	(Jamaica) Dustin Brown (Italy) Alessandro Motti	(Russia) Teymuraz Gabashvili (Germany) Dieter Kindlmann	(Argentina) Juan Pablo Brzezicki (Italy) Paolo Lorenzi (Belgium) Yannick Mertens (Spain) Pablo Andújar
May 10	2010 BNP Paribas Primrose Bordeaux; Bordeaux, France; Regular series Clay (red) – €85,000 – 32S/32Q/16D; Singles – Doubles	(France) Richard Gasquet; 4–6, 6–1, 6–4	(France) Michaël Llodra	(Uzbekistan) Denis Istomin (France) Florent Serra	(France) Benoît Paire (France) Édouard Roger-Vasselin (Belgium) Xavier Malisse (Belgium) Olivier Rochus
May 10	2010 BNP Paribas Primrose Bordeaux; Bordeaux, France; Regular series Clay (red) – €85,000 – 32S/32Q/16D; Singles – Doubles	(France) Nicolas Mahut (France) Édouard Roger-Vasselin; 5–7, 6–3, [10–7]	(Slovakia) Karol Beck (Czech Republic) Leoš Friedl	(Uzbekistan) Denis Istomin (France) Florent Serra	(France) Benoît Paire (France) Édouard Roger-Vasselin (Belgium) Xavier Malisse (Belgium) Olivier Rochus
May 10	2010 Busan Open Challenger Tennis; Busan, South Korea; Regular series Hard – $75,000 – 32S/32Q/16D; Singles – Doubles	(South Korea) Lim Yong-Kyu; 6–1, 6–4	(Chinese Taipei) Lu Yen-hsun	(South Korea) Jun Woong-Sun (Japan) Go Soeda	(Canada) Pierre-Ludovic Duclos (Australia) Rameez Junaid (Japan) Tatsuma Ito (Japan) Hiroki Kondo
May 10	2010 Busan Open Challenger Tennis; Busan, South Korea; Regular series Hard – $75,000 – 32S/32Q/16D; Singles – Doubles	(Australia) Rameez Junaid (Austria) Alexander Peya; 6–4, 7–5	(Canada) Pierre-Ludovic Duclos (Chinese Taipei) Yang Tsung-hua	(South Korea) Jun Woong-Sun (Japan) Go Soeda	(Canada) Pierre-Ludovic Duclos (Australia) Rameez Junaid (Japan) Tatsuma Ito (Japan) Hiroki Kondo
May 10	2010 Sarasota Open; Sarasota, United States; Regular series Clay – $50,000 (green) – 32S/32Q/16D; Singles – Doubles	(Japan) Kei Nishikori; 2–6, 6–3, 6–4	(Argentina) Brian Dabul	(United States) Ryan Sweeting (Mexico) Daniel Garza	(Mexico) Bruno Rodríguez (United States) Bobby Reynolds (Australia) Matt Reid (United States) Jesse Levine
May 10	2010 Sarasota Open; Sarasota, United States; Regular series Clay – $50,000 (green) – 32S/32Q/16D; Singles – Doubles	(United States) Brian Battistone (United States) Ryler DeHeart; 5–7, 7–6(4), [10–8]	(Germany) Gero Kretschmer (Germany) Alex Satschko	(United States) Ryan Sweeting (Mexico) Daniel Garza	(Mexico) Bruno Rodríguez (United States) Bobby Reynolds (Australia) Matt Reid (United States) Jesse Levine
May 10	2010 Zagreb Open; Zagreb, Croatia; Regular series Clay (red) – €42,500 – 32S/32Q/16D; Singles – Doubles	(Kazakhstan) Yuri Schukin; 6–3, 7–5	(Spain) Santiago Ventura	(Brazil) Marcos Daniel (Argentina) Federico Delbonis	(Spain) Rubén Ramírez Hidalgo (Slovenia) Blaž Kavčič (Argentina) Gastón Gaudio (Chile) Nicolás Massú
May 10	2010 Zagreb Open; Zagreb, Croatia; Regular series Clay (red) – €42,500 – 32S/32Q/16D; Singles – Doubles	(Germany) Andre Begemann (Australia) Matthew Ebden; 7–6(5), 5–7, [10–3]	(Spain) Rubén Ramírez Hidalgo (Spain) Santiago Ventura	(Brazil) Marcos Daniel (Argentina) Federico Delbonis	(Spain) Rubén Ramírez Hidalgo (Slovenia) Blaž Kavčič (Argentina) Gastón Gaudio (Chile) Nicolás Massú
May 17	2010 Trofeo Paolo Corazzi; Cremona, Italy; Regular series Hard – €30,000 – 32S/32Q/16D; Singles – Doubles	(Germany) Denis Gremelmayr; 6–4, 7–5	(Romania) Marius Copil	(Australia) Bernard Tomic (Austria) Alexander Peya	(Italy) Marco Crugnola (Japan) Go Soeda (Germany) Matthias Bachinger (Italy) Andrea Stoppini
May 17	2010 Trofeo Paolo Corazzi; Cremona, Italy; Regular series Hard – €30,000 – 32S/32Q/16D; Singles – Doubles	(Austria) Alexander Peya (Austria) Martin Slanar; 7–5, 7–5	(South Africa) Rik de Voest (South Africa) Izak van der Merwe	(Australia) Bernard Tomic (Austria) Alexander Peya	(Italy) Marco Crugnola (Japan) Go Soeda (Germany) Matthias Bachinger (Italy) Andrea Stoppini
May 17	2010 Fergana Challenger; Fergana, Uzbekistan; Regular series Hard – $35,000 – 32S/32Q/16D; Singles – Doubles	(Russia) Evgeny Kirillov; 6–3, 2–6, 6–2	(China) Zhang Ze	(Russia) Alexander Kudryavtsev (South Korea) Kim Young-Jun	(Israel) Noam Okun (Slovakia) Andrej Martin (China) Gong Maoxin (United States) Brendan Evans
May 17	2010 Fergana Challenger; Fergana, Uzbekistan; Regular series Hard – $35,000 – 32S/32Q/16D; Singles – Doubles	(United States) Brendan Evans (Japan) Toshihide Matsui; 3–6, 6–3, [10–8]	(China) Gong Maoxin (China) Li Zhe	(Russia) Alexander Kudryavtsev (South Korea) Kim Young-Jun	(Israel) Noam Okun (Slovakia) Andrej Martin (China) Gong Maoxin (United States) Brendan Evans
May 24	2010 Alessandria Challenger; Alessandria, Italy; Regular series Clay (red) – €30,000 – 32S/32Q/16D; Singles – Doubles	(Germany) Björn Phau; 7–6(6), 2–6, 6–2	(Argentina) Carlos Berlocq	(Morocco) Reda El Amrani (Argentina) Juan Pablo Brzezicki	(Czech Republic) Lukáš Rosol (Brazil) João Souza (Italy) Simone Vagnozzi (Spain) Daniel Muñoz de la Nava
May 24	2010 Alessandria Challenger; Alessandria, Italy; Regular series Clay (red) – €30,000 – 32S/32Q/16D; Singles – Doubles	(Croatia) Ivan Dodig (Croatia) Lovro Zovko; 6–4, 6–4	(Italy) Marco Crugnola (Spain) Daniel Muñoz de la Nava	(Morocco) Reda El Amrani (Argentina) Juan Pablo Brzezicki	(Czech Republic) Lukáš Rosol (Brazil) João Souza (Italy) Simone Vagnozzi (Spain) Daniel Muñoz de la Nava
May 24	2010 USTA LA Tennis Open; Carson, United States; Regular series Hard – $50,000 – 32S/32Q/16D; Singles – Doubles	(United States) Donald Young; 6–4, 6–4	(United States) Robert Kendrick	(Canada) Peter Polansky (United States) Lester Cook	(Australia) Marinko Matosevic (Australia) Dayne Kelly (United States) Tim Smyczek (United States) Alex Kuznetsov
May 24	2010 USTA LA Tennis Open; Carson, United States; Regular series Hard – $50,000 – 32S/32Q/16D; Singles – Doubles	(United States) Brian Battistone (United States) Nicholas Monroe; 5–7, 6–3, [10–4]	(Russia) Artem Sitak (Portugal) Leonardo Tavares	(Canada) Peter Polansky (United States) Lester Cook	(Australia) Marinko Matosevic (Australia) Dayne Kelly (United States) Tim Smyczek (United States) Alex Kuznetsov
May 31	2010 Franken Challenge; Fürth, Germany; Regular series Clay (red) – €42,500 – 32S/32Q/16D; Singles – Doubles	(Netherlands) Robin Haase; 6–4, 6–2	(Germany) Tobias Kamke	(Germany) Julian Reister (Germany) Simon Greul	(Germany) Dieter Kindlmann (Kazakhstan) Mikhail Kukushkin (France) Vincent Millot (Germany) Marcel Zimmermann
May 31	2010 Franken Challenge; Fürth, Germany; Regular series Clay (red) – €42,500 – 32S/32Q/16D; Singles – Doubles	(Jamaica) Dustin Brown (Australia) Rameez Junaid; 6–3, 6–1	(Germany) Martin Emmrich (Australia) Joseph Sirianni	(Germany) Julian Reister (Germany) Simon Greul	(Germany) Dieter Kindlmann (Kazakhstan) Mikhail Kukushkin (France) Vincent Millot (Germany) Marcel Zimmermann
May 31	2010 Aegon Trophy; Nottingham, Great Britain; Regular series Grass – €42,500 – 32S/32Q/16D; Singles – Doubles	(Lithuania) Ričardas Berankis; 6–4, 6–4	(Japan) Go Soeda	(France) Adrian Mannarino (Germany) Andre Begemann	(Germany) Simon Stadler (United States) Ryan Harrison (United Kingdom) Alexander Ward (Turkey) Marsel İlhan
May 31	2010 Aegon Trophy; Nottingham, Great Britain; Regular series Grass – €42,500 – 32S/32Q/16D; Singles – Doubles	(United Kingdom) Colin Fleming (United Kingdom) Ken Skupski; 7–6(3), 6–4	(United States) Eric Butorac (United States) Scott Lipsky	(France) Adrian Mannarino (Germany) Andre Begemann	(Germany) Simon Stadler (United States) Ryan Harrison (United Kingdom) Alexander Ward (Turkey) Marsel İlhan
May 31	2010 UniCredit Czech Open; Prostějov, Czech Republic; Regular series Clay (red) – €106,500 – 32S/32Q/16D; Singles – Doubles	(Czech Republic) Jan Hájek; 6–0, RET	(Czech Republic) Radek Štěpánek	(Kazakhstan) Andrey Golubev (Czech Republic) Jaroslav Pospíšil	(Finland) Jarkko Nieminen (Belgium) Olivier Rochus (Spain) Albert Ramos Viñolas (Portugal) Frederico Gil
May 31	2010 UniCredit Czech Open; Prostějov, Czech Republic; Regular series Clay (red) – €106,500 – 32S/32Q/16D; Singles – Doubles	(Spain) Marcel Granollers (Spain) David Marrero; 3–6, 6–4, [10–8]	(Sweden) Johan Brunström (Netherlands Antilles) Jean-Julien Rojer	(Kazakhstan) Andrey Golubev (Czech Republic) Jaroslav Pospíšil	(Finland) Jarkko Nieminen (Belgium) Olivier Rochus (Spain) Albert Ramos Viñolas (Portugal) Frederico Gil
May 31	2010 Due Ponti Cup; Rome, Italy; Regular series Clay (red) – €42,500 – 32S/32Q/16D; Singles – Doubles	(Italy) Filippo Volandri; 6–3, 6–2	(Morocco) Reda El Amrani	(Croatia) Antonio Veić (Romania) Adrian Ungur	(Romania) Victor Crivoi (Italy) Simone Bolelli (Czech Republic) Dušan Lojda (Argentina) Carlos Berlocq
May 31	2010 Due Ponti Cup; Rome, Italy; Regular series Clay (red) – €42,500 – 32S/32Q/16D; Singles – Doubles	(Mexico) Santiago González (United States) Travis Rettenmaier; 6–2, 6–4	(Australia) Sadik Kadir (India) Purav Raja	(Croatia) Antonio Veić (Romania) Adrian Ungur	(Romania) Victor Crivoi (Italy) Simone Bolelli (Czech Republic) Dušan Lojda (Argentina) Carlos Berlocq
May 31	2010 Weil Tennis Academy Challenger; Ojai, United States; Regular series Hard – $50,000 – 32S/32Q/16D; Singles – Doubles	(United States) Bobby Reynolds; 3–6, 7–5, 7–5	(Australia) Marinko Matosevic	(United States) Donald Young (Argentina) Brian Dabul	(Chile) Paul Capdeville (Slovenia) Luka Gregorc (United States) Tim Smyczek (United States) Lester Cook
May 31	2010 Weil Tennis Academy Challenger; Ojai, United States; Regular series Hard – $50,000 – 32S/32Q/16D; Singles – Doubles	(Russia) Artem Sitak (Portugal) Leonardo Tavares; 4–6, 6–4, [10–8]	(India) Harsh Mankad (South Africa) Izak van der Merwe	(United States) Donald Young (Argentina) Brian Dabul	(Chile) Paul Capdeville (Slovenia) Luka Gregorc (United States) Tim Smyczek (United States) Lester Cook

=== June ===
Week of	Tournament	Champion	Runner-up	Semifinalists	Quarterfinalists
June 7	2010 Košice Open; Košice, Slovakia; Regular Series; Clay – €30,000 – 32S/32Q/16D; Singles – Doubles	(Spain) Rubén Ramírez Hidalgo; 6–3, 6–2	(Serbia) Filip Krajinović	(Kazakhstan) Mikhail Kukushkin (Brazil) Caio Zampieri	(Czech Republic) Ivo Minář (Romania) Victor Crivoi (Chile) Jorge Aguilar (Slovakia) Miloslav Mečíř Jr.
June 7	2010 Košice Open; Košice, Slovakia; Regular Series; Clay – €30,000 – 32S/32Q/16D; Singles – Doubles	(Slovakia) Miloslav Mečíř Jr. (Slovakia) Marek Semjan; 3–6, 6–1, [13–11]	(Brazil) Ricardo Hocevar (Brazil) Caio Zampieri	(Kazakhstan) Mikhail Kukushkin (Brazil) Caio Zampieri	(Czech Republic) Ivo Minář (Romania) Victor Crivoi (Chile) Jorge Aguilar (Slovakia) Miloslav Mečíř Jr.
June 7	2010 BSI Challenger Lugano; Lugano, Switzerland; Regular Series; Clay – €85,000 – 32S/32Q/16D; Singles – Doubles	(Switzerland) Stan Wawrinka; 6–7(2), 6–2, 6–1	(Italy) Potito Starace	(Russia) Teymuraz Gabashvili (Spain) Alberto Martín	(Italy) Alessio di Mauro (Romania) Adrian Ungur (Austria) Martin Fischer (France) Vincent Millot
June 7	2010 BSI Challenger Lugano; Lugano, Switzerland; Regular Series; Clay – €85,000 – 32S/32Q/16D; Singles – Doubles	(Portugal) Frederico Gil (Belgium) Christophe Rochus; 7–5, 7–6(3)	(Mexico) Santiago González (United States) Travis Rettenmaier	(Russia) Teymuraz Gabashvili (Spain) Alberto Martín	(Italy) Alessio di Mauro (Romania) Adrian Ungur (Austria) Martin Fischer (France) Vincent Millot
June 14	2010 ZRE Katowice Bytom Open; Bytom, Poland; Regular series Clay – €30,000 – 32S/32Q/16D; Singles – Doubles	(Spain) Pere Riba; 6–0, 6–3	(Argentina) Facundo Bagnis	(Czech Republic) Jaroslav Pospíšil (Germany) Matthias Bachinger	(Poland) Jerzy Janowicz (Croatia) Nikola Mektić (Romania) Marius Copil (Chile) Paul Capdeville
June 14	2010 ZRE Katowice Bytom Open; Bytom, Poland; Regular series Clay – €30,000 – 32S/32Q/16D; Singles – Doubles	(Slovakia) Ivo Klec (Ukraine) Artem Smirnov; 1–6, 6–3, [10–3]	(Russia) Konstantin Kravchuk (Ukraine) Ivan Sergeyev	(Czech Republic) Jaroslav Pospíšil (Germany) Matthias Bachinger	(Poland) Jerzy Janowicz (Croatia) Nikola Mektić (Romania) Marius Copil (Chile) Paul Capdeville
June 14	2010 Aspria Tennis Cup; Milan, Italy; Regular series Clay – €30,000 – 32S/32Q/16D; Singles – Doubles	(Portugal) Frederico Gil; 6–1, 7–5	(Argentina) Máximo González	(Spain) Rubén Ramírez Hidalgo (Argentina) Diego Junqueira	(Argentina) Carlos Berlocq (Argentina) Gastón Gaudio (Kazakhstan) Mikhail Kukushkin (Romania) Adrian Ungur
June 14	2010 Aspria Tennis Cup; Milan, Italy; Regular series Clay – €30,000 – 32S/32Q/16D; Singles – Doubles	(Italy) Daniele Bracciali (Spain) Rubén Ramírez Hidalgo; 6–4, 7–5	(United States) James Cerretani (South Africa) Jeff Coetzee	(Spain) Rubén Ramírez Hidalgo (Argentina) Diego Junqueira	(Argentina) Carlos Berlocq (Argentina) Gastón Gaudio (Kazakhstan) Mikhail Kukushkin (Romania) Adrian Ungur
June 21	2010 Marburg Open; Marburg, Germany; Regular series Clay – €30,000 – 32S/32Q/16D; Singles – Doubles	(Italy) Simone Vagnozzi; 2–6, 6–3, 7–5	(Czech Republic) Ivo Minář	(Bulgaria) Grigor Dimitrov (Czech Republic) Jaroslav Pospíšil	(Slovakia) Pavol Červenák (Republic of Ireland) Conor Niland (France) Guillaume Rufin (Spain) Daniel Muñoz de la Nava
June 21	2010 Marburg Open; Marburg, Germany; Regular series Clay – €30,000 – 32S/32Q/16D; Singles – Doubles	(Germany) Matthias Bachinger (Germany) Denis Gremelmayr; 6–4, 6–4	(Spain) Guillermo Olaso (Slovenia) Grega Žemlja	(Bulgaria) Grigor Dimitrov (Czech Republic) Jaroslav Pospíšil	(Slovakia) Pavol Červenák (Republic of Ireland) Conor Niland (France) Guillaume Rufin (Spain) Daniel Muñoz de la Nava
June 21	2010 Camparini Gioielli Cup; Reggio Emilia, Italy; Regular series Clay – €42,500 – 32S/32Q/16D; Singles – Doubles	(Argentina) Carlos Berlocq; 6–0, 7–6(1)	(Spain) Pablo Andújar	(Romania) Adrian Ungur (Argentina) Federico Delbonis	(Italy) Filippo Volandri (Chile) Paul Capdeville (Austria) Daniel Köllerer (Italy) Thomas Fabbiano
June 21	2010 Camparini Gioielli Cup; Reggio Emilia, Italy; Regular series Clay – €42,500 – 32S/32Q/16D; Singles – Doubles	(Austria) Philipp Oswald (Austria) Martin Slanar; 6–2, 5–7, [10–6]	(Australia) Sadik Kadir (India) Purav Raja	(Romania) Adrian Ungur (Argentina) Federico Delbonis	(Italy) Filippo Volandri (Chile) Paul Capdeville (Austria) Daniel Köllerer (Italy) Thomas Fabbiano
June 28	2010 Nord LB Open; Braunschweig, Germany; Regular Series; Clay – €106,500+H – 32S/32Q/16D; Singles – Doubles	(Kazakhstan) Mikhail Kukushkin; 6–2, 3–0 retired	(Brazil) Marcos Daniel	(France) Olivier Patience (Switzerland) Stéphane Bohli	(Czech Republic) Robin Vik (Argentina) Federico Delbonis (Belgium) Steve Darcis (Kazakhstan) Yuri Schukin
June 28	2010 Nord LB Open; Braunschweig, Germany; Regular Series; Clay – €106,500+H – 32S/32Q/16D; Singles – Doubles	(Portugal) Leonardo Tavares (Italy) Simone Vagnozzi; 7–5, 7–6(4)	(Russia) Igor Kunitsyn (Kazakhstan) Yuri Schukin	(France) Olivier Patience (Switzerland) Stéphane Bohli	(Czech Republic) Robin Vik (Argentina) Federico Delbonis (Belgium) Steve Darcis (Kazakhstan) Yuri Schukin
June 28	2010 Sporting Challenger; Turin, Italy; Tretorn SERIE+ Clay (red) – €85,000+H – 32S/32Q/16D; Singles – Doubles	(Italy) Simone Bolelli; 7–6(7), 6–2	(Italy) Potito Starace	(Argentina) Carlos Berlocq (Spain) Daniel Gimeno Traver	(Portugal) Frederico Gil (France) Charles-Antoine Brézac (Italy) Filippo Volandri (Italy) Alessio di Mauro
June 28	2010 Sporting Challenger; Turin, Italy; Tretorn SERIE+ Clay (red) – €85,000+H – 32S/32Q/16D; Singles – Doubles	(Argentina) Carlos Berlocq (Portugal) Frederico Gil; 6–3, 7–6(5)	(Italy) Daniele Bracciali (Italy) Potito Starace	(Argentina) Carlos Berlocq (Spain) Daniel Gimeno Traver	(Portugal) Frederico Gil (France) Charles-Antoine Brézac (Italy) Filippo Volandri (Italy) Alessio di Mauro
June 28	2010 Nielsen Pro Tennis Championship; Winnetka, United States; Regular series Hard – $50,000 – 32S/21Q/16D; Singles – Doubles	(Argentina) Brian Dabul; 6–1, 1–6, 6–1	(United States) Tim Smyczek	(United States) Daniel Young (United States) Michael Russell	(Germany) Björn Phau (United States) Lester Cook (Canada) Milos Raonic (South Africa) Rik de Voest
June 28	2010 Nielsen Pro Tennis Championship; Winnetka, United States; Regular series Hard – $50,000 – 32S/21Q/16D; Singles – Doubles	(United States) Ryler DeHeart (Canada) Pierre-Ludovic Duclos; 7–6(4), 4–6, [10–8]	(South Africa) Rik de Voest (India) Somdev Devvarman	(United States) Daniel Young (United States) Michael Russell	(Germany) Björn Phau (United States) Lester Cook (Canada) Milos Raonic (South Africa) Rik de Voest
June 28	2010 Arad Challenger; Arad, Romania; Regular series Clay – €30,000+H – 32S/32Q/16D; Singles – Doubles	(France) David Guez; 6–3, 6–1	(France) Benoît Paire	(Romania) Victor Crivoi (Spain) Daniel Muñoz de la Nava	(Croatia) Antonio Veić (Slovakia) Pavol Červenák (Serbia) Boris Pašanski (Czech Republic) Dušan Lojda
June 28	2010 Arad Challenger; Arad, Romania; Regular series Clay – €30,000+H – 32S/32Q/16D; Singles – Doubles	(Spain) Daniel Muñoz de la Nava (Spain) Sergio Pérez-Pérez; 6–4, 6–1	(Croatia) Franko Škugor (Croatia) Ivan Zovko	(Romania) Victor Crivoi (Spain) Daniel Muñoz de la Nava	(Croatia) Antonio Veić (Slovakia) Pavol Červenák (Serbia) Boris Pašanski (Czech Republic) Dušan Lojda

=== July ===
Week of	Tournament	Champion	Runner-up	Semifinalists	Quarterfinalists
July 5	2010 Open Diputación Ciudad de Pozoblanco; Pozoblanco, Spain; Tretorn SERIE+ Hard – €85,000+H – 32S/32Q/16D; Singles – Doubles	(Spain) Rubén Ramírez Hidalgo; 7–6(6), 6–4	(Spain) Roberto Bautista Agut	(New Zealand) Daniel King-Turner (Russia) Konstantin Kravchuk	(Germany) Gero Kretschmer (Belgium) Niels Desein (Russia) Alexander Kudryavtsev (Czech Republic) Jan Hernych
July 5	2010 Open Diputación Ciudad de Pozoblanco; Pozoblanco, Spain; Tretorn SERIE+ Hard – €85,000+H – 32S/32Q/16D; Singles – Doubles	(Spain) Marcel Granollers (Spain) Gerard Granollers Pujol; 6–4, 4–6, [10–4]	(United States) Brian Battistone (Sweden) Filip Prpic	(New Zealand) Daniel King-Turner (Russia) Konstantin Kravchuk	(Germany) Gero Kretschmer (Belgium) Niels Desein (Russia) Alexander Kudryavtsev (Czech Republic) Jan Hernych
July 5	2010 Siemens Open; Scheveningen, Netherlands; Tretorn SERIE+ Clay – €42,500+H – 32S/32Q/16D; Singles – Doubles	(Germany) Denis Gremelmayr; 7–5, 6–4	(Netherlands) Thomas Schoorel	(Belgium) Steve Darcis (Kazakhstan) Yuri Schukin	(Netherlands) Jasper Smit (Germany) Tobias Kamke (France) Alexandre Sidorenko (Poland) Jerzy Janowicz
July 5	2010 Siemens Open; Scheveningen, Netherlands; Tretorn SERIE+ Clay – €42,500+H – 32S/32Q/16D; Singles – Doubles	(Brazil) Franco Ferreiro (India) Harsh Mankad; 6–4, 3–6, [10–7]	(Australia) Rameez Junaid (Germany) Philipp Marx	(Belgium) Steve Darcis (Kazakhstan) Yuri Schukin	(Netherlands) Jasper Smit (Germany) Tobias Kamke (France) Alexandre Sidorenko (Poland) Jerzy Janowicz
July 5	2010 Oberstaufen Cup; Oberstaufen, Germany; Regular series Clay – €30,000+H – 32S/32Q/16D; Singles – Doubles	(Austria) Martin Fischer; 6–3, 6–4	(Germany) Cedrik-Marcel Stebe	(Germany) Simon Greul (Germany) Julian Reister	(Germany) Mischa Zverev (Chile) Hans Podlipnik Castillo (Germany) Marcel Zimmermann (Germany) Peter Gojowczyk
July 5	2010 Oberstaufen Cup; Oberstaufen, Germany; Regular series Clay – €30,000+H – 32S/32Q/16D; Singles – Doubles	(Germany) Frank Moser (Czech Republic) Lukáš Rosol; 6–0, 7–5	(Chile) Hans Podlipnik Castillo (Austria) Max Raditschnigg	(Germany) Simon Greul (Germany) Julian Reister	(Germany) Mischa Zverev (Chile) Hans Podlipnik Castillo (Germany) Marcel Zimmermann (Germany) Peter Gojowczyk
July 5	2010 Carisap Tennis Cup; San Benedetto, Italy; Regular series Clay – €30,000+H – 32S/32Q/16D; Singles – Doubles	(Argentina) Carlos Berlocq; 6–3, 4–6, 6–4	(Spain) Daniel Gimeno Traver	(Spain) Albert Ramos Viñolas (Romania) Adrian Ungur	(Spain) Pere Riba (Czech Republic) Dušan Lojda (Italy) Paolo Lorenzi (Slovakia) Martin Kližan
July 5	2010 Carisap Tennis Cup; San Benedetto, Italy; Regular series Clay – €30,000+H – 32S/32Q/16D; Singles – Doubles	(Italy) Thomas Fabbiano (Spain) Gabriel Trujillo Soler; 7–6(4), 7–6(5)	(Italy) Francesco Aldi (Italy) Daniele Giorgini	(Spain) Albert Ramos Viñolas (Romania) Adrian Ungur	(Spain) Pere Riba (Czech Republic) Dušan Lojda (Italy) Paolo Lorenzi (Slovakia) Martin Kližan
July 12	2010 Seguros Bolívar Open Bogotá; Bogotá, Colombia; Regular series Clay – €125,000+H – 32S/32Q/16D; Singles – Doubles	(Colombia) Robert Farah; 6–3, 2–6, 7–6(3)	(Colombia) Carlos Salamanca	(Argentina) Sebastián Decoud (Colombia) Juan Sebastián Cabal	(Colombia) Santiago Giraldo (Brazil) Marcos Daniel (Colombia) Eduardo Struvay (Colombia) Alejandro González
July 12	2010 Seguros Bolívar Open Bogotá; Bogotá, Colombia; Regular series Clay – €125,000+H – 32S/32Q/16D; Singles – Doubles	(Colombia) Juan Sebastián Cabal (Colombia) Robert Farah; 7–6(4), 6–4	(Dominican Republic) Víctor Estrella (Colombia) Alejandro González	(Argentina) Sebastián Decoud (Colombia) Juan Sebastián Cabal	(Colombia) Santiago Giraldo (Brazil) Marcos Daniel (Colombia) Eduardo Struvay (Colombia) Alejandro González
July 12	2010 Comerica Bank Challenger; Aptos, USA; Regular series Hard – €75,000 – 32S/32Q/16D; Singles – Doubles	(Australia) Marinko Matosevic; 6–4, 6–2	(United States) Donald Young	(Australia) Carsten Ball (India) Somdev Devvarman	(Germany) Simon Stadler (Australia) Brydan Klein (Serbia) Ilija Bozoljac (United Kingdom) Alex Bogdanovic
July 12	2010 Comerica Bank Challenger; Aptos, USA; Regular series Hard – €75,000 – 32S/32Q/16D; Singles – Doubles	(Australia) Carsten Ball (Australia) Chris Guccione; 6–1, 6–3	(Australia) Adam Feeney (Australia) Greg Jones	(Australia) Carsten Ball (India) Somdev Devvarman	(Germany) Simon Stadler (Australia) Brydan Klein (Serbia) Ilija Bozoljac (United Kingdom) Alex Bogdanovic
July 12	2010 Riviera di Rimini Challenger; Rimini, Italy; Regular series Clay – €42,500+H – 32S/32Q/16D; Singles – Doubles	(Italy) Paolo Lorenzi; 6–2, 6–0	(Argentina) Federico Delbonis	(Argentina) Juan Pablo Brzezicki (Italy) Alessio di Mauro	(Germany) Denis Gremelmayr (Croatia) Ivan Dodig (Italy) Daniele Giorgini (Romania) Adrian Ungur
July 12	2010 Riviera di Rimini Challenger; Rimini, Italy; Regular series Clay – €42,500+H – 32S/32Q/16D; Singles – Doubles	(Italy) Giulio Di Meo (Romania) Adrian Ungur; 7–6(6), 3–6, [10–7]	(Argentina) Juan Pablo Brzezicki (Austria) Alexander Peya	(Argentina) Juan Pablo Brzezicki (Italy) Alessio di Mauro	(Germany) Denis Gremelmayr (Croatia) Ivan Dodig (Italy) Daniele Giorgini (Romania) Adrian Ungur
July 19	2010 Poznań Porsche Open; Poznań, Poland; Tretorn SERIE+ Clay – €85,000+H – 32S/32Q/16D; Singles – Doubles	(Germany) Denis Gremelmayr; 6–1, 6–2	(Russia) Andrey Kuznetsov	(Czech Republic) Dušan Lojda (Spain) Daniel Muñoz de la Nava	(Australia) Peter Luczak (Portugal) Rui Machado (France) Jonathan Dasnières de Veigy (Portugal) Frederico Gil
July 19	2010 Poznań Porsche Open; Poznań, Poland; Tretorn SERIE+ Clay – €85,000+H – 32S/32Q/16D; Singles – Doubles	(Portugal) Rui Machado (Spain) Daniel Muñoz de la Nava; 6–2, 6–3	(United States) James Cerretani (Canada) Adil Shamasdin	(Czech Republic) Dušan Lojda (Spain) Daniel Muñoz de la Nava	(Australia) Peter Luczak (Portugal) Rui Machado (France) Jonathan Dasnières de Veigy (Portugal) Frederico Gil
July 19	2010 Trofeo Bellaveglia; Orbetello, Italy; Regular series Clay – €64,000+H – 32S/32Q/16D; Singles – Doubles	(Spain) Pablo Andújar; 6–4, 6–3	(France) Édouard Roger-Vasselin	(Romania) Adrian Ungur (Russia) Evgeny Donskoy	(Argentina) Juan-Martín Aranguren (Italy) Paolo Lorenzi (Netherlands) Robin Haase (Italy) Gianluca Naso
July 19	2010 Trofeo Bellaveglia; Orbetello, Italy; Regular series Clay – €64,000+H – 32S/32Q/16D; Singles – Doubles	(Italy) Alessio di Mauro (Italy) Alessandro Motti; 6–2, 3–6, [10–3]	(Croatia) Nikola Mektić (Croatia) Ivan Zovko	(Romania) Adrian Ungur (Russia) Evgeny Donskoy	(Argentina) Juan-Martín Aranguren (Italy) Paolo Lorenzi (Netherlands) Robin Haase (Italy) Gianluca Naso
July 19	2010 Fifth Third Bank Tennis Championships; Lexington, USA; Regular series Hard – €50,000 – 32S/32Q/16D; Singles – Doubles	(Australia) Carsten Ball; 6–4, 7–6(1)	(United States) Jesse Levine	(United States) Alex Kuznetsov (United States) Alex Bogomolov Jr.	(Canada) Peter Polansky (United States) Kevin Kim (Ukraine) Sergei Bubka (Chile) Paul Capdeville
July 19	2010 Fifth Third Bank Tennis Championships; Lexington, USA; Regular series Hard – €50,000 – 32S/32Q/16D; Singles – Doubles	(South Africa) Raven Klaasen (South Africa) Izak van der Merwe; 5–7, 6–4, [10–7]	(Australia) Kaden Hensel (Australia) Adam Hubble	(United States) Alex Kuznetsov (United States) Alex Bogomolov Jr.	(Canada) Peter Polansky (United States) Kevin Kim (Ukraine) Sergei Bubka (Chile) Paul Capdeville
July 19	2010 Penza Cup; Penza, Russia; Regular series Hard – €50,000 – 32S/32Q/16D; Singles – Doubles	(Kazakhstan) Mikhail Kukushkin; 6–3, 6–7(3), 6–3	(Russia) Konstantin Kravchuk	(Russia) Valery Rudnev (Belarus) Uladzimir Ignatik	(Russia) Alexander Kudryavtsev (Russia) Andrey Kumantsov (Spain) Íñigo Cervantes-Huegun (Republic of Ireland) Conor Niland
July 19	2010 Penza Cup; Penza, Russia; Regular series Hard – €50,000 – 32S/32Q/16D; Singles – Doubles	(Russia) Mikhail Elgin (Austria) Nikolaus Moser; 6–4, 6–4	(Belarus) Aliaksandr Bury (Belarus) Kiryl Harbatsiuk	(Russia) Valery Rudnev (Belarus) Uladzimir Ignatik	(Russia) Alexander Kudryavtsev (Russia) Andrey Kumantsov (Spain) Íñigo Cervantes-Huegun (Republic of Ireland) Conor Niland
July 19	2010 Guzzini Challenger; Recanati, Italy; Regular series Hard – €30,000+H – 32S/32Q/16D; Singles – Doubles	(Switzerland) Stéphane Bohli; 6–0, 3–6, 7–6(5)	(France) Adrian Mannarino	(France) Charles-Antoine Brézac (France) Josselin Ouanna	(France) David Guez (Italy) Riccardo Ghedin (Slovakia) Ivo Klec (Portugal) Leonardo Tavares
July 19	2010 Guzzini Challenger; Recanati, Italy; Regular series Hard – €30,000+H – 32S/32Q/16D; Singles – Doubles	(United Kingdom) Jamie Delgado (Croatia) Lovro Zovko; 7–6(6), 6–1	(France) Charles-Antoine Brézac (France) Vincent Stouff	(France) Charles-Antoine Brézac (France) Josselin Ouanna	(France) David Guez (Italy) Riccardo Ghedin (Slovakia) Ivo Klec (Portugal) Leonardo Tavares
July 26	2010 Zucchetti Kos Tennis Cup; Cordenons, Italy; Tretorn SERIE+ Clay – €85,000+H – 32S/32Q/16D; Singles – Doubles	(Belgium) Steve Darcis; 6–2, 6–4	(Spain) Daniel Muñoz de la Nava	(France) Vincent Millot (Netherlands) Robin Haase	(Czech Republic) Lukáš Rosol (Netherlands) Thomas Schoorel (France) Édouard Roger-Vasselin (Argentina) Juan Pablo Brzezicki
July 26	2010 Zucchetti Kos Tennis Cup; Cordenons, Italy; Tretorn SERIE+ Clay – €85,000+H – 32S/32Q/16D; Singles – Doubles	(Netherlands) Robin Haase (Netherlands) Rogier Wassen; 7–6(14), 7–5	(United States) James Cerretani (Canada) Adil Shamasdin	(France) Vincent Millot (Netherlands) Robin Haase	(Czech Republic) Lukáš Rosol (Netherlands) Thomas Schoorel (France) Édouard Roger-Vasselin (Argentina) Juan Pablo Brzezicki
July 26	2010 Challenger Banque Nationale de Granby; Granby, Canada; Regular series Hard – $50,000+H – 32S/32Q/16D; Singles – Doubles	(Germany) Tobias Kamke; 6–3, 7–6(4)	(Canada) Milos Raonic	(Canada) Frank Dancevic (Japan) Go Soeda	(Australia) Greg Jones (Japan) Takao Suzuki (Chile) Paul Capdeville (Australia) Brydan Klein
July 26	2010 Challenger Banque Nationale de Granby; Granby, Canada; Regular series Hard – $50,000+H – 32S/32Q/16D; Singles – Doubles	(Denmark) Frederik Nielsen (Australia) Joseph Sirianni; 4–6, 6–4, [10–6]	(Thailand) Sanchai Ratiwatana (Thailand) Sonchat Ratiwatana	(Canada) Frank Dancevic (Japan) Go Soeda	(Australia) Greg Jones (Japan) Takao Suzuki (Chile) Paul Capdeville (Australia) Brydan Klein
July 26	2010 Mordovia Cup; Saransk, Russia; Regular series Clay – $50,000 – 32S/32Q/16D; Singles – Doubles	(Ukraine) Ivan Sergeyev; 7–6(2), 6–1	(Slovakia) Marek Semjan	(Russia) Evgeny Donskoy (Russia) Andrey Kuznetsov	(Kazakhstan) Mikhail Kukushkin (Spain) Guillermo Olaso (France) Laurent Recouderc (Republic of Ireland) Conor Niland
July 26	2010 Mordovia Cup; Saransk, Russia; Regular series Clay – $50,000 – 32S/32Q/16D; Singles – Doubles	(Russia) Ilya Belyaev (Russia) Mikhail Elgin; 3–6, 7–6(6), [11–9]	(Ukraine) Denys Molchanov (Ukraine) Artem Smirnov	(Russia) Evgeny Donskoy (Russia) Andrey Kuznetsov	(Kazakhstan) Mikhail Kukushkin (Spain) Guillermo Olaso (France) Laurent Recouderc (Republic of Ireland) Conor Niland
July 26	2010 Tampere Open; Tampere, Finland; Regular series Clay – €42,500 – 32S/32Q/16D; Singles – Doubles	(France) Éric Prodon; 6–4, 6–4	(Portugal) Leonardo Tavares	(Germany) Simon Stadler (Spain) Óscar Hernández	(Italy) Matteo Viola (Italy) Alberto Brizzi (Argentina) Martín Alund (Belgium) Yannick Mertens
July 26	2010 Tampere Open; Tampere, Finland; Regular series Clay – €42,500 – 32S/32Q/16D; Singles – Doubles	(Portugal) João Sousa (Portugal) Leonardo Tavares; 7–6(3), 7–5	(Latvia) Andis Juška (Latvia) Deniss Pavlovs	(Germany) Simon Stadler (Spain) Óscar Hernández	(Italy) Matteo Viola (Italy) Alberto Brizzi (Argentina) Martín Alund (Belgium) Yannick Mertens

=== August ===
Week of	Tournament	Champion	Runner-up	Semifinalists	Quarterfinalists
August 2	2010 Odlum Brown Vancouver Open; Vancouver, Canada; Regular series Hard – $100,000 – 32S/17Q/16D/3Q; Singles – Doubles	(Israel) Dudi Sela; 7–5, 6–2	(Lithuania) Ričardas Berankis	(United States) Taylor Dent (United States) Lester Cook	(United States) Bobby Reynolds (Australia) Marinko Matosevic (United States) Jesse Levine (United Kingdom) James Ward
August 2	2010 Odlum Brown Vancouver Open; Vancouver, Canada; Regular series Hard – $100,000 – 32S/17Q/16D/3Q; Singles – Doubles	(Philippines) Treat Conrad Huey (United Kingdom) Dominic Inglot; 6–4, 7–5	(United States) Ryan Harrison (United States) Jesse Levine	(United States) Taylor Dent (United States) Lester Cook	(United States) Bobby Reynolds (Australia) Marinko Matosevic (United States) Jesse Levine (United Kingdom) James Ward
August 2	2010 Open Castilla y León; Segovia, Spain; Tretorn SERIE+ €85,000 +H – hard – 32S/29Q/16D; Singles – Doubles	(Spain) Daniel Gimeno Traver; 6–4, 7–6(2)	(France) Adrian Mannarino	(France) Vincent Millot (Netherlands) Jesse Huta Galung	(Belgium) Yannick Mertens (France) Nicolas Mahut (Russia) Alexander Kudryavtsev (Spain) Roberto Bautista Agut
August 2	2010 Open Castilla y León; Segovia, Spain; Tretorn SERIE+ €85,000 +H – hard – 32S/29Q/16D; Singles – Doubles	(Brazil) Thiago Alves (Brazil) Franco Ferreiro; 6–2, 5–7, [10–8]	(United States) Brian Battistone (India) Harsh Mankad	(France) Vincent Millot (Netherlands) Jesse Huta Galung	(Belgium) Yannick Mertens (France) Nicolas Mahut (Russia) Alexander Kudryavtsev (Spain) Roberto Bautista Agut
August 2	2010 San Marino CEPU Open; City of San Marino, San Marino; Tretorn SERIE+ Clay (red) – €85,000+H – 32S/24Q/16D; Singles – Doubles	(Netherlands) Robin Haase; 6–2, 7–6(8)	(Italy) Filippo Volandri	(Italy) Potito Starace (Italy) Flavio Cipolla	(Argentina) Carlos Berlocq (Portugal) Rui Machado (Spain) Pere Riba (Chile) Jorge Aguilar
August 2	2010 San Marino CEPU Open; City of San Marino, San Marino; Tretorn SERIE+ Clay (red) – €85,000+H – 32S/24Q/16D; Singles – Doubles	(Italy) Daniele Bracciali (Croatia) Lovro Zovko; 3–6, 6–2, [10–5]	(Switzerland) Yves Allegro (United States) James Cerretani	(Italy) Potito Starace (Italy) Flavio Cipolla	(Argentina) Carlos Berlocq (Portugal) Rui Machado (Spain) Pere Riba (Chile) Jorge Aguilar
August 2	2010 Beijing International Challenger; Beijing, China; Regular series Hard – $75,000+H – 32S/32Q/16D; Singles – Doubles	(Croatia) Franko Škugor; 4–6, 6–4, 6–3	(France) Laurent Recouderc	(China) Gong Maoxin (South Korea) Jun Woong-sun	(Republic of Ireland) Conor Niland (China) Wu Di (China) Bai Yan (Russia) Andrey Kumantsov
August 2	2010 Beijing International Challenger; Beijing, China; Regular series Hard – $75,000+H – 32S/32Q/16D; Singles – Doubles	(Canada) Pierre-Ludovic Duclos (Russia) Artem Sitak; 7–6(4), 7–6(5)	(Australia) Sadik Kadir (India) Purav Raja	(China) Gong Maoxin (South Korea) Jun Woong-sun	(Republic of Ireland) Conor Niland (China) Wu Di (China) Bai Yan (Russia) Andrey Kumantsov
August 2	2010 Austrian Open Kitzbühel; Kitzbühel, Austria; Regular series Clay – €64,000+H – 32S/32Q/16D; Singles – Doubles	(Italy) Andreas Seppi; 6–2, 6–1	(Romania) Victor Crivoi	(Uruguay) Pablo Cuevas (Austria) Andreas Haider-Maurer	(Austria) Daniel Köllerer (Czech Republic) Ivo Minář (Australia) Peter Luczak (Czech Republic) Lukáš Rosol
August 2	2010 Austrian Open Kitzbühel; Kitzbühel, Austria; Regular series Clay – €64,000+H – 32S/32Q/16D; Singles – Doubles	(Jamaica) Dustin Brown (Netherlands) Rogier Wassen; 3–6, 7–5, [10–7]	(Chile) Hans Podlipnik Castillo (Austria) Max Raditschnigg	(Uruguay) Pablo Cuevas (Austria) Andreas Haider-Maurer	(Austria) Daniel Köllerer (Czech Republic) Ivo Minář (Australia) Peter Luczak (Czech Republic) Lukáš Rosol
August 2	2010 MasterCard Tennis Cup; Campos do Jordão, Brazil; Regular series Hard – $50,000+H – 32S/32Q/16D; Singles – Doubles	(South Africa) Izak van der Merwe; 7–6(6), 6–3	(Brazil) Ricardo Mello	(Ecuador) Giovanni Lapentti (Colombia) Robert Farah	(Colombia) Juan Sebastián Cabal (Brazil) Ricardo Hocevar (Brazil) Caio Zampieri (Italy) Riccardo Ghedin
August 2	2010 MasterCard Tennis Cup; Campos do Jordão, Brazil; Regular series Hard – $50,000+H – 32S/32Q/16D; Singles – Doubles	(Brazil) Rogério Dutra da Silva (Brazil) Júlio Silva; 7–6(3), 6–2	(Brazil) Vítor Manzini (Brazil) Pedro Zerbinni	(Ecuador) Giovanni Lapentti (Colombia) Robert Farah	(Colombia) Juan Sebastián Cabal (Brazil) Ricardo Hocevar (Brazil) Caio Zampieri (Italy) Riccardo Ghedin
August 9	2010 American Express – TED Open; Istanbul, Turkey; Regular series Hard – $100,000+H – 32S/16Q/16D; Singles – Doubles	(France) Adrian Mannarino; 6–4, 3–6, 6–3	(Kazakhstan) Mikhail Kukushkin	(Russia) Igor Kunitsyn (Portugal) Frederico Gil	(Romania) Adrian Ungur (Portugal) João Sousa (Russia) Konstantin Kravchuk (Austria) Martin Fischer
August 9	2010 American Express – TED Open; Istanbul, Turkey; Regular series Hard – $100,000+H – 32S/16Q/16D; Singles – Doubles	(Czech Republic) Leoš Friedl (Serbia) Dušan Vemić; 7–6(6), 7–6(3)	(United States) Brian Battistone (Sweden) Andreas Siljeström	(Russia) Igor Kunitsyn (Portugal) Frederico Gil	(Romania) Adrian Ungur (Portugal) João Sousa (Russia) Konstantin Kravchuk (Austria) Martin Fischer
August 9	2010 LG&T Tennis Challenger; Binghamton, United States; Regular series Hard – $50,000 – 32S/28Q/16D/4Q; Singles – Doubles	(Japan) Kei Nishikori; 6–3, 7–6(4)	(United States) Robert Kendrick	(United States) Alex Bogomolov Jr. (Australia) Chris Guccione	(Argentina) Brian Dabul (United States) Jesse Witten (United States) Bradley Klahn (Japan) Go Soeda
August 9	2010 LG&T Tennis Challenger; Binghamton, United States; Regular series Hard – $50,000 – 32S/28Q/16D/4Q; Singles – Doubles	(Philippines) Treat Conrad Huey (United Kingdom) Dominic Inglot; 5–7, 7–6(2), [10–8]	(United States) Scott Lipsky (United States) David Martin	(United States) Alex Bogomolov Jr. (Australia) Chris Guccione	(Argentina) Brian Dabul (United States) Jesse Witten (United States) Bradley Klahn (Japan) Go Soeda
August 9	2010 Aberto de Brasília; Brasília, Brazil; Regular series Hard – $35,000+H – 32S/28Q/16D; Singles – Doubles	(Japan) Tatsuma Ito; 6–4, 6–4	(South Africa) Izak van der Merwe	(Brazil) Ricardo Mello (Brazil) Rogério Dutra da Silva	(Belarus) Uladzimir Ignatik (Brazil) João Souza (Republic of Ireland) Louk Sorensen (Colombia) Robert Farah
August 9	2010 Aberto de Brasília; Brasília, Brazil; Regular series Hard – $35,000+H – 32S/28Q/16D; Singles – Doubles	(Brazil) Franco Ferreiro (Brazil) André Sá; 7–6(5), 6–3	(Brazil) Ricardo Mello (Brazil) Caio Zampieri	(Brazil) Ricardo Mello (Brazil) Rogério Dutra da Silva	(Belarus) Uladzimir Ignatik (Brazil) João Souza (Republic of Ireland) Louk Sorensen (Colombia) Robert Farah
August 9	2010 Samarkand Challenger; Samarkand, Uzbekistan; Regular series Clay (red) – $35,000+H – 32S/32Q/16D; Singles – Doubles	(Slovakia) Andrej Martin; 6–4,7–5	(Slovakia) Marek Semjan	(Estonia) Jürgen Zopp (Latvia) Andis Juška	(Slovenia) Blaž Kavčič (Russia) Valery Rudnev (New Zealand) Michael Venus (Chinese Taipei) Yang Tsung-hua
August 9	2010 Samarkand Challenger; Samarkand, Uzbekistan; Regular series Clay (red) – $35,000+H – 32S/32Q/16D; Singles – Doubles	(Latvia) Andis Juška (Latvia) Deniss Pavlovs; 7–5, 6–3	(Chinese Taipei) Lee Hsin-han (Chinese Taipei) Yang Tsung-hua	(Estonia) Jürgen Zopp (Latvia) Andis Juška	(Slovenia) Blaž Kavčič (Russia) Valery Rudnev (New Zealand) Michael Venus (Chinese Taipei) Yang Tsung-hua
August 9	2010 Trani Cup; Trani, Italy; Regular series Clay (red) – €30,000+H – 32S/16Q/16D; Singles – Doubles	(Netherlands) Jesse Huta Galung; 7–6(3), 6–4	(Italy) Filippo Volandri	(Portugal) Leonardo Tavares (Italy) Matteo Trevisan	(Poland) Jerzy Janowicz (Italy) Francesco Aldi (Italy) Flavio Cipolla (Italy) Daniele Giorgini
August 9	2010 Trani Cup; Trani, Italy; Regular series Clay (red) – €30,000+H – 32S/16Q/16D; Singles – Doubles	(Italy) Thomas Fabbiano (Italy) Matteo Trevisan; 6–2, 7–5	(Italy) Daniele Bracciali (Italy) Filippo Volandri	(Portugal) Leonardo Tavares (Italy) Matteo Trevisan	(Poland) Jerzy Janowicz (Italy) Francesco Aldi (Italy) Flavio Cipolla (Italy) Daniele Giorgini
August 16	2010 Aberto de Bahia; Salvador, Brazil; Regular series Hard – $35,000+H – 32S/32Q/16D; Singles – Doubles	(Brazil) Ricardo Mello; 5–7, 6–4, 6–4	(Brazil) Thiago Alves	(Australia) Matthew Ebden (Belarus) Uladzimir Ignatik	(Japan) Yūichi Sugita (Brazil) Caio Zampieri (France) David Guez (Republic of Ireland) Louk Sorensen
August 16	2010 Aberto de Bahia; Salvador, Brazil; Regular series Hard – $35,000+H – 32S/32Q/16D; Singles – Doubles	(Brazil) Franco Ferreiro (Brazil) André Sá; 6–2, 6–4	(Belarus) Uladzimir Ignatik (Slovakia) Martin Kližan	(Australia) Matthew Ebden (Belarus) Uladzimir Ignatik	(Japan) Yūichi Sugita (Brazil) Caio Zampieri (France) David Guez (Republic of Ireland) Louk Sorensen
August 16	2010 Karshi Challenger; Qarshi, Uzbekistan; Regular series Hard – $35,000+H – 32S/32Q/16D; Singles – Doubles	(Slovenia) Blaž Kavčič; 7–6(6), 7–6(5)	(New Zealand) Michael Venus	(India) Vishnu Vardhan (Chinese Taipei) Yang Tsung-hua	(Spain) Carles Poch Gradin (Slovakia) Marek Semjan (Slovakia) Miloslav Mečíř Jr. (Czech Republic) Jan Minář
August 16	2010 Karshi Challenger; Qarshi, Uzbekistan; Regular series Hard – $35,000+H – 32S/32Q/16D; Singles – Doubles	(China) Gong Maoxin (China) Li Zhe; 6–3, 6–1	(India) Divij Sharan (India) Vishnu Vardhan	(India) Vishnu Vardhan (Chinese Taipei) Yang Tsung-hua	(Spain) Carles Poch Gradin (Slovakia) Marek Semjan (Slovakia) Miloslav Mečíř Jr. (Czech Republic) Jan Minář
August 16	2010 Concurso Int'l de Tenis – San Sebastián; San Sebastián, Spain; Regular series Clay (red) – €30,000+H – 32S/21Q/16D; Singles – Doubles	(Spain) Albert Ramos Viñolas; 6–4, 6–2	(France) Benoît Paire	(Germany) Julian Reister (Spain) Rubén Ramírez Hidalgo	(Chile) Jorge Aguilar (Italy) Gianluca Naso (Netherlands) Thomas Schoorel (Netherlands) Jesse Huta Galung
August 16	2010 Concurso Int'l de Tenis – San Sebastián; San Sebastián, Spain; Regular series Clay (red) – €30,000+H – 32S/21Q/16D; Singles – Doubles	(Spain) Rubén Ramírez Hidalgo (Spain) Santiago Ventura; 6–4, 7–6(3)	(United States) Brian Battistone (Sweden) Andreas Siljeström	(Germany) Julian Reister (Spain) Rubén Ramírez Hidalgo	(Chile) Jorge Aguilar (Italy) Gianluca Naso (Netherlands) Thomas Schoorel (Netherlands) Jesse Huta Galung
August 23	2010 Savoldi–Cò – Trofeo Dimmidisì; Manerbio, Italy; Regular series Clay – $64,000+H – 32S/32Q/16D; Singles – Doubles	(Netherlands) Robin Haase; 6–3, 6–2	(Italy) Marco Crugnola	(Italy) Alberto Brizzi (Romania) Victor Crivoi	(Italy) Filippo Volandri (Netherlands) Thomas Schoorel (Belgium) Steve Darcis (Italy) Alessio di Mauro
August 23	2010 Savoldi–Cò – Trofeo Dimmidisì; Manerbio, Italy; Regular series Clay – $64,000+H – 32S/32Q/16D; Singles – Doubles	(Netherlands) Robin Haase (Netherlands) Thomas Schoorel; 6–4, 6–4	(Argentina) Diego Junqueira (Spain) Gabriel Trujillo Soler	(Italy) Alberto Brizzi (Romania) Victor Crivoi	(Italy) Filippo Volandri (Netherlands) Thomas Schoorel (Belgium) Steve Darcis (Italy) Alessio di Mauro
August 23	2010 Astana Cup; Astana, Kazakhstan; Regular series Hard – $50,000 – 32S/32Q/16D; Singles – Doubles	(Russia) Igor Kunitsyn; 4–6, 7–6(5), 7–6(3)	(Russia) Konstantin Kravchuk	(Slovakia) Andrej Martin (Israel) Amir Weintraub	(Japan) Hiroki Kondo (New Zealand) Michael Venus (Slovakia) Marek Semjan (China) Zhang Ze
August 23	2010 Astana Cup; Astana, Kazakhstan; Regular series Hard – $50,000 – 32S/32Q/16D; Singles – Doubles	(Russia) Mikhail Elgin (Austria) Nikolaus Moser; 6–0, 6–4	(China) Wu Di (China) Zhang Ze	(Slovakia) Andrej Martin (Israel) Amir Weintraub	(Japan) Hiroki Kondo (New Zealand) Michael Venus (Slovakia) Marek Semjan (China) Zhang Ze
August 23	2010 IPP Trophy; Geneva, Switzerland; Regular series Clay – €30,000+H – 32S/21Q/16D; Singles – Doubles	(Bulgaria) Grigor Dimitrov; 6–2, 4–6, 6–4	(Spain) Pablo Andújar	(France) Éric Prodon (Belgium) David Goffin	(Italy) Paolo Lorenzi (Spain) Albert Ramos Viñolas (France) Laurent Rochette (France) Jonathan Eysseric
August 23	2010 IPP Trophy; Geneva, Switzerland; Regular series Clay – €30,000+H – 32S/21Q/16D; Singles – Doubles	(Germany) Gero Kretschmer (Germany) Alex Satschko; 6–3, 4–6, [11–9]	(Austria) Philipp Oswald (Austria) Martin Slanar	(France) Éric Prodon (Belgium) David Goffin	(Italy) Paolo Lorenzi (Spain) Albert Ramos Viñolas (France) Laurent Rochette (France) Jonathan Eysseric
August 30	2010 Città di Como Challenger; Como, Italy; Regular series Hard – $30,000+H – 32S/32Q/16D; Singles – Doubles	(Netherlands) Robin Haase; 6–4, 6–3	(Czech Republic) Ivo Minář	(Germany) Julian Reister (Italy) Filippo Volandri	(Portugal) Rui Machado (Italy) Gianluca Naso (France) Laurent Recouderc (Belgium) Steve Darcis
August 30	2010 Città di Como Challenger; Como, Italy; Regular series Hard – $30,000+H – 32S/32Q/16D; Singles – Doubles	(Germany) Frank Moser (Czech Republic) David Škoch; 5–7, 7–6(2), [10–5]	(Germany) Martin Emmrich (Poland) Mateusz Kowalczyk	(Germany) Julian Reister (Italy) Filippo Volandri	(Portugal) Rui Machado (Italy) Gianluca Naso (France) Laurent Recouderc (Belgium) Steve Darcis

=== September ===
Week of	Tournament	Champion	Runner-up	Semifinalists	Quarterfinalists
September 6	2010 AON Open Challenger; Genova, Italy; Regular series Clay (red) – €85,000+H – 32S/27Q/16D; Singles – Doubles	(Italy) Fabio Fognini; 6–4, 6–1	(Italy) Potito Starace	(Italy) Simone Bolelli (Italy) Andreas Seppi	(Spain) Pablo Andújar (Russia) Andrey Kumantsov (Germany) Mischa Zverev (Italy) Filippo Volandri
September 6	2010 AON Open Challenger; Genova, Italy; Regular series Clay (red) – €85,000+H – 32S/27Q/16D; Singles – Doubles	(Germany) Andre Begemann (Germany) Martin Emmrich; 1–6, 7–6(3), [10–7]	(United States) Brian Battistone (Sweden) Andreas Siljeström	(Italy) Simone Bolelli (Italy) Andreas Seppi	(Spain) Pablo Andújar (Russia) Andrey Kumantsov (Germany) Mischa Zverev (Italy) Filippo Volandri
September 6	2010 Copa Sevilla; Seville, Spain; Regular series Clay – €42,500+H (Yellow) – 32S/32Q/16D; Singles – Doubles	(Spain) Albert Ramos Viñolas; 6–3, 3–6, 7–5	(Spain) Pere Riba	(Serbia) Nikola Ćirić (Portugal) Rui Machado	(Spain) Iván Navarro (United Kingdom) James Ward (Italy) Marco Crugnola (Portugal) João Sousa
September 6	2010 Copa Sevilla; Seville, Spain; Regular series Clay – €42,500+H (Yellow) – 32S/32Q/16D; Singles – Doubles	(Spain) Daniel Muñoz de la Nava (Spain) Santiago Ventura; 6–2, 7–5	(Serbia) Nikola Ćirić (Spain) Guillermo Olaso	(Serbia) Nikola Ćirić (Portugal) Rui Machado	(Spain) Iván Navarro (United Kingdom) James Ward (Italy) Marco Crugnola (Portugal) João Sousa
September 6	2010 Trophée des Alpilles; Saint-Rémy-de-Provence, France; Regular series Hard – €42,500+H – 32S/14Q/16D; Singles – Doubles	(Poland) Jerzy Janowicz; 3–6, 7–6(8), 7–6(6)	(France) Édouard Roger-Vasselin	(Republic of Ireland) Conor Niland (Russia) Igor Kunitsyn	(Germany) Rainer Schüttler (Luxembourg) Gilles Müller (France) Josselin Ouanna (Switzerland) Stéphane Bohli
September 6	2010 Trophée des Alpilles; Saint-Rémy-de-Provence, France; Regular series Hard – €42,500+H – 32S/14Q/16D; Singles – Doubles	(Luxembourg) Gilles Müller (France) Édouard Roger-Vasselin; 6–0, 2–6, [13–11]	(Latvia) Andis Juška (Latvia) Deniss Pavlovs	(Republic of Ireland) Conor Niland (Russia) Igor Kunitsyn	(Germany) Rainer Schüttler (Luxembourg) Gilles Müller (France) Josselin Ouanna (Switzerland) Stéphane Bohli
September 6	2010 TEAN International; Alphen aan den Rijn, Netherlands; Regular series Clay (red) – €42,500 – 32S/32Q/16D; Singles – Doubles	(Netherlands) Jesse Huta Galung; 6–7(4), 6–4, 6–4	(Netherlands) Thomas Schoorel	(Germany) Jan-Lennard Struff (Germany) Bastian Knittel	(Belgium) Christophe Rochus (France) Olivier Patience (Germany) Andreas Beck (Germany) Simon Greul
September 6	2010 TEAN International; Alphen aan den Rijn, Netherlands; Regular series Clay (red) – €42,500 – 32S/32Q/16D; Singles – Doubles	(Uzbekistan) Farrukh Dustov (Austria) Bertram Steinberger; 6–4, 6–1	(Netherlands) Roy Bruggeling (Netherlands) Bas van der Valk	(Germany) Jan-Lennard Struff (Germany) Bastian Knittel	(Belgium) Christophe Rochus (France) Olivier Patience (Germany) Andreas Beck (Germany) Simon Greul
September 6	2010 Rijeka Open; Rijeka, Croatia; Regular series Clay (red) – €30,000+H – 32S/32Q/16D; Singles – Doubles	(Slovenia) Blaž Kavčič; 6–4, 3–6, 7–6(5)	(Spain) Rubén Ramírez Hidalgo	(Slovenia) Grega Žemlja (Argentina) Carlos Berlocq	(Slovakia) Andrej Martin (Hungary) Attila Balázs (Germany) Matthias Bachinger (Italy) Alberto Brizzi
September 6	2010 Rijeka Open; Rijeka, Croatia; Regular series Clay (red) – €30,000+H – 32S/32Q/16D; Singles – Doubles	(Canada) Adil Shamasdin (Croatia) Lovro Zovko; 1–6, 7–6(9), [10–5]	(Argentina) Carlos Berlocq (Spain) Rubén Ramírez Hidalgo	(Slovenia) Grega Žemlja (Argentina) Carlos Berlocq	(Slovakia) Andrej Martin (Hungary) Attila Balázs (Germany) Matthias Bachinger (Italy) Alberto Brizzi
September 6	2010 Brașov Challenger; Brașov, Romania; Regular series Clay (red) – €30,000+H – 32S/19Q/15D; Singles – Doubles	(France) Éric Prodon; 7–6(1), 6–3	(Czech Republic) Jaroslav Pospíšil	(Austria) Andreas Haider-Maurer (Italy) Alessio di Mauro	(Spain) Guillermo Alcaide (Italy) Matteo Trevisan (Italy) Daniele Giorgini (Romania) Adrian Ungur
September 6	2010 Brașov Challenger; Brașov, Romania; Regular series Clay (red) – €30,000+H – 32S/19Q/15D; Singles – Doubles	(Italy) Flavio Cipolla (Italy) Daniele Giorgini; 6–3, 6–4	(Moldova) Radu Albot (Moldova) Andrei Ciumac	(Austria) Andreas Haider-Maurer (Italy) Alessio di Mauro	(Spain) Guillermo Alcaide (Italy) Matteo Trevisan (Italy) Daniele Giorgini (Romania) Adrian Ungur
September 13	2010 Pekao Szczecin Open; Szczecin, Poland; Tretorn SERIE+ Clay (red) – €106,500+H – 32S/31Q/16D; Singles – Doubles	(Uruguay) Pablo Cuevas; 6–1, 6–1	(Russia) Igor Andreev	(France) Olivier Patience (Spain) Daniel Muñoz de la Nava	(Czech Republic) Lukáš Rosol (Germany) Tobias Kamke (France) Vincent Millot (Germany) Julian Reister
September 13	2010 Pekao Szczecin Open; Szczecin, Poland; Tretorn SERIE+ Clay (red) – €106,500+H – 32S/31Q/16D; Singles – Doubles	(Jamaica) Dustin Brown (Netherlands) Rogier Wassen; 6–4, 7–5	(Australia) Rameez Junaid (Germany) Philipp Marx	(France) Olivier Patience (Spain) Daniel Muñoz de la Nava	(Czech Republic) Lukáš Rosol (Germany) Tobias Kamke (France) Vincent Millot (Germany) Julian Reister
September 13	2010 Banja Luka Challenger; Banja Luka, Bosnia and Herzegovina; Regular series €64,000 +H – clay (red) – 32S/32Q/16D; Singles – Doubles	(Turkey) Marsel İlhan; 6–0, 7–6(4)	(Spain) Pere Riba	(Czech Republic) Jaroslav Pospíšil (Spain) Rubén Ramírez Hidalgo	(Serbia) Filip Krajinović (Germany) Björn Phau (Spain) Guillermo Alcaide (Russia) Ilya Belyaev
September 13	2010 Banja Luka Challenger; Banja Luka, Bosnia and Herzegovina; Regular series €64,000 +H – clay (red) – 32S/32Q/16D; Singles – Doubles	(United States) James Cerretani (Czech Republic) David Škoch; 6–1, 6–4	(Canada) Adil Shamasdin (Croatia) Lovro Zovko	(Czech Republic) Jaroslav Pospíšil (Spain) Rubén Ramírez Hidalgo	(Serbia) Filip Krajinović (Germany) Björn Phau (Spain) Guillermo Alcaide (Russia) Ilya Belyaev
September 13	2010 USTA Challenger of Oklahoma; Tulsa, United States; Regular series Hard – $50,000 – 32S/24Q/16D; Singles – Doubles	(United States) Bobby Reynolds; 6–3, 6–3	(United States) Lester Cook	(South Africa) Andrew Anderson (United States) Tim Smyczek	(United States) Michael McClune (United States) Kevin Kim (United States) Jesse Witten (South Korea) Daniel Yoo
September 13	2010 USTA Challenger of Oklahoma; Tulsa, United States; Regular series Hard – $50,000 – 32S/24Q/16D; Singles – Doubles	(South Africa) Andrew Anderson (South Africa) Fritz Wolmarans; 6–2, 6–3	(United States) Brett Joelson (Canada) Chris Klingemann	(South Africa) Andrew Anderson (United States) Tim Smyczek	(United States) Michael McClune (United States) Kevin Kim (United States) Jesse Witten (South Korea) Daniel Yoo
September 13	2010 Chang-Sat Bangkok Open; Bangkok, Thailand; Regular series Hard – $35,000+H – 32S/32Q/16D; Singles – Doubles	(Bulgaria) Grigor Dimitrov; 6–1, 6–4	(Russia) Konstantin Kravchuk	(Germany) Sebastian Rieschick (Japan) Go Soeda	(United Kingdom) James Ward (Japan) Tatsuma Ito (Russia) Dmitry Tursunov (Germany) Peter Gojowczyk
September 13	2010 Chang-Sat Bangkok Open; Bangkok, Thailand; Regular series Hard – $35,000+H – 32S/32Q/16D; Singles – Doubles	(China) Gong Maoxin (China) Li Zhe; 6–3, 6–4	(India) Yuki Bhambri (United States) Ryler DeHeart	(Germany) Sebastian Rieschick (Japan) Go Soeda	(United Kingdom) James Ward (Japan) Tatsuma Ito (Russia) Dmitry Tursunov (Germany) Peter Gojowczyk
September 13	2010 BH Tennis Open International Cup; Belo Horizonte, Brazil; Regular series Hard – $35,000+H – 32S/25Q/16D; Singles – Doubles	(Brazil) Rogério Dutra da Silva; 6–4, 6–3	(Argentina) Facundo Argüello	(Argentina) Facundo Bagnis (Brazil) Rodrigo Guidolin	(Brazil) Leonardo Kirche (Brazil) Ricardo Hocevar (Brazil) Júlio Silva (Argentina) Marco Trungelliti
September 13	2010 BH Tennis Open International Cup; Belo Horizonte, Brazil; Regular series Hard – $35,000+H – 32S/25Q/16D; Singles – Doubles	(Brazil) Rodrigo Grilli (Brazil) Leonardo Kirche; 6–3, 6–3	(Sweden) Christian Lindell (Brazil) João Souza	(Argentina) Facundo Bagnis (Brazil) Rodrigo Guidolin	(Brazil) Leonardo Kirche (Brazil) Ricardo Hocevar (Brazil) Júlio Silva (Argentina) Marco Trungelliti
September 13	2010 Internazionali di Tennis dell'Umbria; Todi, Italy; Regular series Clay (red) – €30,000+H – 32S/31Q/16D; Singles – Doubles	(Argentina) Carlos Berlocq; 6–4, 6–3	(Spain) Marcel Granollers	(Italy) Alessio di Mauro (Slovenia) Janez Semrajc	(Argentina) Juan-Martín Aranguren (Spain) Óscar Hernández (Spain) Gerard Granollers Pujol (Argentina) Máximo González
September 13	2010 Internazionali di Tennis dell'Umbria; Todi, Italy; Regular series Clay (red) – €30,000+H – 32S/31Q/16D; Singles – Doubles	(Italy) Flavio Cipolla (Italy) Alessio di Mauro; 6–1, 6–4	(Spain) Marcel Granollers (Spain) Gerard Granollers Pujol	(Italy) Alessio di Mauro (Slovenia) Janez Semrajc	(Argentina) Juan-Martín Aranguren (Spain) Óscar Hernández (Spain) Gerard Granollers Pujol (Argentina) Máximo González
September 20	2010 Copa Petrobras Bogotá; Bogotá, Colombia; Regular series Clay (red) – $75,000+H – 32S/24Q/16D; Singles – Doubles	(Brazil) João Souza; 6–4, 7–6(5)	(Morocco) Reda El Amrani	(Argentina) Sebastián Decoud (Brazil) Marcos Daniel	(Paraguay) Ramón Delgado (Colombia) Carlos Salamanca (South Africa) Izak van der Merwe (Colombia) Juan Sebastián Cabal
September 20	2010 Copa Petrobras Bogotá; Bogotá, Colombia; Regular series Clay (red) – $75,000+H – 32S/24Q/16D; Singles – Doubles	(Brazil) Franco Ferreiro (Brazil) André Sá; 7–6(6), 6–4	(Germany) Gero Kretschmer (Germany) Alex Satschko	(Argentina) Sebastián Decoud (Brazil) Marcos Daniel	(Paraguay) Ramón Delgado (Colombia) Carlos Salamanca (South Africa) Izak van der Merwe (Colombia) Juan Sebastián Cabal
September 20	2010 Türk Telecom İzmir Cup; İzmir, Turkey; Regular series Hard – €64,000+H – 32S/31Q/16D; Singles – Doubles	(India) Somdev Devvarman; 6–4, 6–3	(Turkey) Marsel İlhan	(Switzerland) Stéphane Bohli (Germany) Matthias Bachinger	(Russia) Igor Kunitsyn (Slovakia) Martin Kližan (Luxembourg) Gilles Müller (Belgium) Yannick Mertens
September 20	2010 Türk Telecom İzmir Cup; İzmir, Turkey; Regular series Hard – €64,000+H – 32S/31Q/16D; Singles – Doubles	(Australia) Rameez Junaid (Germany) Frank Moser; 6–2, 6–4	(United Kingdom) Jamie Delgado (United Kingdom) Jonathan Marray	(Switzerland) Stéphane Bohli (Germany) Matthias Bachinger	(Russia) Igor Kunitsyn (Slovakia) Martin Kližan (Luxembourg) Gilles Müller (Belgium) Yannick Mertens
September 20	2010 ATP Challenger Trophy; Trnava, Slovakia; Regular series Clay (red) – €64,000 – 32S/21Q/16D; Singles – Doubles	(Czech Republic) Jaroslav Pospíšil; 6–4, 4–6, 6–3	(Kazakhstan) Yuri Schukin	(Austria) Stefan Koubek (Czech Republic) Dušan Lojda	(Serbia) Filip Krajinović (Czech Republic) Lukáš Rosol (Germany) Alexander Flock (Czech Republic) Jan Hernych
September 20	2010 ATP Challenger Trophy; Trnava, Slovakia; Regular series Clay (red) – €64,000 – 32S/21Q/16D; Singles – Doubles	(Slovakia) Karol Beck (Czech Republic) Lukáš Rosol; 4–6, 7–6(3), [10–8]	(Austria) Alexander Peya (Austria) Martin Slanar	(Austria) Stefan Koubek (Czech Republic) Dušan Lojda	(Serbia) Filip Krajinović (Czech Republic) Lukáš Rosol (Germany) Alexander Flock (Czech Republic) Jan Hernych
September 20	2010 BMW Ljubljana Open; Ljubljana, Slovenia; Regular series Clay (red) – €42,500 – 32S/30Q/16D; Singles – Doubles	(Slovenia) Blaž Kavčič; 6–2, 4–6, 7–5	(Belgium) David Goffin	(Serbia) Nikola Ćirić (Italy) Alessio di Mauro	(Italy) Stefano Galvani (France) Jonathan Dasnières de Veigy (Italy) Andrea Arnaboldi (France) Augustin Gensse
September 20	2010 BMW Ljubljana Open; Ljubljana, Slovenia; Regular series Clay (red) – €42,500 – 32S/30Q/16D; Singles – Doubles	(Croatia) Nikola Mektić (Croatia) Ivan Zovko; 3–6, 6–0, [10–3]	(Croatia) Marin Draganja (Croatia) Dino Marcan	(Serbia) Nikola Ćirić (Italy) Alessio di Mauro	(Italy) Stefano Galvani (France) Jonathan Dasnières de Veigy (Italy) Andrea Arnaboldi (France) Augustin Gensse
September 20	2010 Chang-Sat Bangkok 2 Open; Bangkok, Thailand; Regular series Hard – $35,000+H – 32S/32Q/16D; Singles – Doubles	(Bulgaria) Grigor Dimitrov; 6–4, 6–1	(Russia) Alexander Kudryavtsev	(Germany) Denis Gremelmayr (Japan) Go Soeda	(Brazil) Thiago Alves (United States) Michael Russell (Thailand) Danai Udomchoke (Germany) Sebastian Rieschick
September 20	2010 Chang-Sat Bangkok 2 Open; Bangkok, Thailand; Regular series Hard – $35,000+H – 32S/32Q/16D; Singles – Doubles	(Thailand) Sanchai Ratiwatana (Thailand) Sonchat Ratiwatana; 6–3, 7–5	(Denmark) Frederik Nielsen (Japan) Yūichi Sugita	(Germany) Denis Gremelmayr (Japan) Go Soeda	(Brazil) Thiago Alves (United States) Michael Russell (Thailand) Danai Udomchoke (Germany) Sebastian Rieschick
September 27	2010 Copa Petrobras Montevideo; Montevideo, Uruguay; Regular series Clay (red) – $75,000+H – 32S/24Q/16D; Singles – Doubles	(Argentina) Máximo González; 1–6, 6–3, 6–4	(Uruguay) Pablo Cuevas	(Argentina) Martín Vassallo Argüello (Chile) Jorge Aguilar	(Argentina) Federico Delbonis (Argentina) Juan Pablo Brzezicki (Argentina) Carlos Berlocq (Argentina) Brian Dabul
September 27	2010 Copa Petrobras Montevideo; Montevideo, Uruguay; Regular series Clay (red) – $75,000+H – 32S/24Q/16D; Singles – Doubles	(Argentina) Carlos Berlocq (Argentina) Brian Dabul; 7–5, 6–3	(Argentina) Máximo González (Argentina) Sebastián Prieto	(Argentina) Martín Vassallo Argüello (Chile) Jorge Aguilar	(Argentina) Federico Delbonis (Argentina) Juan Pablo Brzezicki (Argentina) Carlos Berlocq (Argentina) Brian Dabul
September 27	2010 Seguros Bolívar Open Cali; Cali, Colombia; Regular series Clay (red) – $75,000+H – 32S/26Q/16D; Singles – Doubles	(Colombia) Carlos Salamanca; 7–5, 3–6, 6-3	(Brazil) Júlio Silva	(Dominican Republic) Víctor Estrella (Colombia) Juan Sebastián Cabal	(Argentina) Facundo Bagnis (Colombia) Robert Farah Maksoud (Colombia) Alejandro González (Argentina) Pablo Galdón
September 27	2010 Seguros Bolívar Open Cali; Cali, Colombia; Regular series Clay (red) – $75,000+H – 32S/26Q/16D; Singles – Doubles	(Germany) Andre Begemann (Germany) Martin Emmrich; 6–4, 7–6(5)	(Germany) Gero Kretschmer (Germany) Alex Satschko	(Dominican Republic) Víctor Estrella (Colombia) Juan Sebastián Cabal	(Argentina) Facundo Bagnis (Colombia) Robert Farah Maksoud (Colombia) Alejandro González (Argentina) Pablo Galdón
September 27	2010 Tennislife Cup; Naples, Italy; Regular series Clay (red) – €42,500+H – 32S/22Q/16D; Singles – Doubles	(Italy) Fabio Fognini; 6–4, 4–2, RET.	(Serbia) Boris Pašanski	(Austria) Andreas Haider-Maurer (Croatia) Antonio Veić	(Italy) Potito Starace (Uzbekistan) Farrukh Dustov (Spain) Albert Ramos Viñolas (Italy) Simone Bolelli
September 27	2010 Tennislife Cup; Naples, Italy; Regular series Clay (red) – €42,500+H – 32S/22Q/16D; Singles – Doubles	(Spain) Daniel Muñoz de la Nava (Italy) Simone Vagnozzi; 1–6, 7–6(5), [10–6]	(Austria) Andreas Haider-Maurer (Germany) Bastian Knittel	(Austria) Andreas Haider-Maurer (Croatia) Antonio Veić	(Italy) Potito Starace (Uzbekistan) Farrukh Dustov (Spain) Albert Ramos Viñolas (Italy) Simone Bolelli

=== October ===
Week of	Tournament	Champion	Runner-up	Semifinalists	Quarterfinalists
October 4	2010 Ethias Trophy; Mons, Belgium; Regular series Hard (i) – €106,500+H – 32S/32Q/16D; Singles – Doubles	(France) Adrian Mannarino; 7–5, 6–4	(Belgium) Steve Darcis	(France) Marc Gicquel (Jamaica) Dustin Brown	(Belgium) Kristof Vliegen (Germany) Denis Gremelmayr (Netherlands) Igor Sijsling (Netherlands) Jesse Huta Galung
October 4	2010 Ethias Trophy; Mons, Belgium; Regular series Hard (i) – €106,500+H – 32S/32Q/16D; Singles – Doubles	(Slovakia) Filip Polášek (Slovakia) Igor Zelenay; 3–6, 6–4, [10–5]	(Belgium) Ruben Bemelmans (Belgium) Yannick Mertens	(France) Marc Gicquel (Jamaica) Dustin Brown	(Belgium) Kristof Vliegen (Germany) Denis Gremelmayr (Netherlands) Igor Sijsling (Netherlands) Jesse Huta Galung
October 4	2010 Copa Petrobras Buenos Aires; Buenos Aires, Argentina; Regular series Clay (red) – $75,000+H – 32S/32Q/16D; Singles – Doubles	(Argentina) Máximo González; 6–4, 6–3	(Uruguay) Pablo Cuevas	(Argentina) Carlos Berlocq (Argentina) Juan Pablo Brzezicki	(Argentina) Diego Junqueira (Serbia) Nikola Ćirić (Slovakia) Pavol Červenák (Chile) Jorge Aguilar
October 4	2010 Copa Petrobras Buenos Aires; Buenos Aires, Argentina; Regular series Clay (red) – $75,000+H – 32S/32Q/16D; Singles – Doubles	(Argentina) Carlos Berlocq (Argentina) Brian Dabul; 6–3, 6–2	(Chile) Jorge Aguilar (Argentina) Federico Delbonis	(Argentina) Carlos Berlocq (Argentina) Juan Pablo Brzezicki	(Argentina) Diego Junqueira (Serbia) Nikola Ćirić (Slovakia) Pavol Červenák (Chile) Jorge Aguilar
October 4	2010 Natomas Men's Pro Tennis Tournament; Sacramento, United States; Regular series Hard – $50,000 – 32S/32Q/16D/4Q; Singles – Doubles	(Australia) John Millman; 6–3, 6–2	(United States) Robert Kendrick	(United States) Alex Bogomolov Jr. (South Africa) Rik de Voest	(Australia) Chris Guccione (Denmark) Frederik Nielsen (United States) Ryan Sweeting (Australia) Marinko Matosevic
October 4	2010 Natomas Men's Pro Tennis Tournament; Sacramento, United States; Regular series Hard – $50,000 – 32S/32Q/16D/4Q; Singles – Doubles	(South Africa) Rik de Voest (South Africa) Izak van der Merwe; 4–6, 6–4, [10–7]	(United States) Nicholas Monroe (United States) Donald Young	(United States) Alex Bogomolov Jr. (South Africa) Rik de Voest	(Australia) Chris Guccione (Denmark) Frederik Nielsen (United States) Ryan Sweeting (Australia) Marinko Matosevic
October 4	2010 Sicilia Classic; Palermo, Italy; Regular series Clay (red) – €42,500 – 32S/30Q/16D; Singles – Doubles	(Hungary) Attila Balázs; 7–6(4), 2–6, 6–1	(Austria) Martin Fischer	(Italy) Matteo Viola (France) Augustin Gensse	(Italy) Gianluca Naso (Czech Republic) Ivo Minář (Italy) Alberto Brizzi (France) Nicolas Devilder
October 4	2010 Sicilia Classic; Palermo, Italy; Regular series Clay (red) – €42,500 – 32S/30Q/16D; Singles – Doubles	(Austria) Martin Fischer (Austria) Philipp Oswald; 4–6, 6–2, [10–6]	(Italy) Alessandro Motti (Italy) Simone Vagnozzi	(Italy) Matteo Viola (France) Augustin Gensse	(Italy) Gianluca Naso (Czech Republic) Ivo Minář (Italy) Alberto Brizzi (France) Nicolas Devilder
October 4	2010 Cerveza Club Premium Open; Quito, Ecuador; Regular series Clay (red) – $35,000 – 32S/30Q/16D; Singles – Doubles	(Ecuador) Giovanni Lapentti; 2–6, 6–3, 6–4	(Brazil) João Souza	(Brazil) Rogério Dutra da Silva (Argentina) Sebastián Decoud	(Argentina) Diego Álvarez (Colombia) Robert Farah (Brazil) Ricardo Hocevar (Colombia) Alejandro González
October 4	2010 Cerveza Club Premium Open; Quito, Ecuador; Regular series Clay (red) – $35,000 – 32S/30Q/16D; Singles – Doubles	(Mexico) Daniel Garza (United States) Eric Nunez; 7–5, 6–4	(Colombia) Alejandro González (Colombia) Carlos Salamanca	(Brazil) Rogério Dutra da Silva (Argentina) Sebastián Decoud	(Argentina) Diego Álvarez (Colombia) Robert Farah (Brazil) Ricardo Hocevar (Colombia) Alejandro González
October 4	2010 Open Tarragona Costa Daurada; Tarragona, Spain; Regular series Clay (red) – €30,000 – 32S/30Q/16D; Singles – Doubles	(Spain) Marcel Granollers; 1–6, 7–5, 6–0	(Czech Republic) Jaroslav Pospíšil	(Spain) Pere Riba (Portugal) Frederico Gil	(Spain) José Checa-Calvo (France) Benoît Paire (Spain) Albert Ramos Viñolas (Spain) Guillermo Olaso
October 4	2010 Open Tarragona Costa Daurada; Tarragona, Spain; Regular series Clay (red) – €30,000 – 32S/30Q/16D; Singles – Doubles	(Spain) Guillermo Olaso (Spain) Pere Riba; 7–6(1), 4–6, [10–5]	(Spain) Pablo Andújar (Spain) Gerard Granollers Pujol	(Spain) Pere Riba (Portugal) Frederico Gil	(Spain) José Checa-Calvo (France) Benoît Paire (Spain) Albert Ramos Viñolas (Spain) Guillermo Olaso
October 11	2010 Tashkent Challenger; Tashkent, Uzbekistan; Regular series Hard – $125,000+H – 32S/16Q/16D; Singles – Doubles	(Slovakia) Karol Beck; 6–7(4), 6–4, 7–5	(Luxembourg) Gilles Müller	(Austria) Andreas Haider-Maurer (Jamaica) Dustin Brown	(Germany) Rainer Schüttler (Uzbekistan) Farrukh Dustov (Belarus) Uladzimir Ignatik (Canada) Milos Raonic
October 11	2010 Tashkent Challenger; Tashkent, Uzbekistan; Regular series Hard – $125,000+H – 32S/16Q/16D; Singles – Doubles	(United Kingdom) Ross Hutchins (United Kingdom) Jamie Murray; 2–6, 6–4, [10–8]	(Slovakia) Karol Beck (Slovakia) Filip Polášek	(Austria) Andreas Haider-Maurer (Jamaica) Dustin Brown	(Germany) Rainer Schüttler (Uzbekistan) Farrukh Dustov (Belarus) Uladzimir Ignatik (Canada) Milos Raonic
October 11	2010 Copa Petrobras Asunción; Asunción, Paraguay; Regular series Clay (red) – $75,000+H – 32S/26Q/16D; Singles – Doubles	(Portugal) Rui Machado; 6–2, 3–6, 7–5	(Paraguay) Ramón Delgado	(Argentina) Carlos Berlocq (Serbia) Nikola Ćirić	(Slovakia) Pavol Červenák (Spain) Rubén Ramírez Hidalgo (Argentina) Pablo Galdón (Spain) Pere Riba
October 11	2010 Copa Petrobras Asunción; Asunción, Paraguay; Regular series Clay (red) – $75,000+H – 32S/26Q/16D; Singles – Doubles	(Italy) Fabio Fognini (Italy) Paolo Lorenzi; 6–3, 6–4	(Argentina) Carlos Berlocq (Argentina) Brian Dabul	(Argentina) Carlos Berlocq (Serbia) Nikola Ćirić	(Slovakia) Pavol Červenák (Spain) Rubén Ramírez Hidalgo (Argentina) Pablo Galdón (Spain) Pere Riba
October 11	2010 Open de Rennes; Rennes, France; Regular series Hard (i) – €64,000+H – 32S/20Q/16D; Singles – Doubles	(France) Marc Gicquel; 7–6(6), 4–6, 6–1	(Switzerland) Stéphane Bohli	(Canada) Frank Dancevic (Spain) Roberto Bautista Agut	(France) Arnaud Clément (Germany) Björn Phau (Australia) Matthew Ebden (Republic of Ireland) Conor Niland
October 11	2010 Open de Rennes; Rennes, France; Regular series Hard (i) – €64,000+H – 32S/20Q/16D; Singles – Doubles	(United States) Scott Lipsky (United States) David Martin; 6–4, 5–7, [12–10]	(Germany) Denis Gremelmayr (Germany) Björn Phau	(Canada) Frank Dancevic (Spain) Roberto Bautista Agut	(France) Arnaud Clément (Germany) Björn Phau (Australia) Matthew Ebden (Republic of Ireland) Conor Niland
October 11	2010 Royal Bank of Scotland Challenger; Tiburon, United States; Regular series Hard – $50,000 – 32S/32Q/16D/4Q; Singles – Doubles	(Germany) Tobias Kamke; 6–1, 6–1	(United States) Ryan Harrison	(Australia) Marinko Matosevic (Australia) Carsten Ball	(United States) Tim Smyczek (United States) Alex Kuznetsov (United States) Kevin Kim (United States) Alex Bogomolov Jr
October 11	2010 Royal Bank of Scotland Challenger; Tiburon, United States; Regular series Hard – $50,000 – 32S/32Q/16D/4Q; Singles – Doubles	(United States) Robert Kendrick (United States) Travis Rettenmaier; 6–1, 6–4	(United States) Ryler DeHeart (Canada) Pierre-Ludovic Duclos	(Australia) Marinko Matosevic (Australia) Carsten Ball	(United States) Tim Smyczek (United States) Alex Kuznetsov (United States) Kevin Kim (United States) Alex Bogomolov Jr
October 18	2010 Samsung Securities Cup; Seoul, South Korea; Tretorn SERIE+ Hard – $125,000+H – 32S/32Q/16D; Singles – Doubles	(Chinese Taipei) Lu Yen-hsun; 6–3, 6–4	(South Africa) Kevin Anderson	(France) Florent Serra (Japan) Yūichi Sugita	(United States) Alex Bogomolov Jr. (Russia) Alexander Kudryavtsev (Israel) Dudi Sela (Slovakia) Marek Semjan
October 18	2010 Samsung Securities Cup; Seoul, South Korea; Tretorn SERIE+ Hard – $125,000+H – 32S/32Q/16D; Singles – Doubles	(Australia) Rameez Junaid (Germany) Frank Moser; 6–3, 6–4	(Canada) Vasek Pospisil (Canada) Adil Shamasdin	(France) Florent Serra (Japan) Yūichi Sugita	(United States) Alex Bogomolov Jr. (Russia) Alexander Kudryavtsev (Israel) Dudi Sela (Slovakia) Marek Semjan
October 18	2010 Open d'Orléans; Orléans, France; Regular series Hard (i) – €106,500+H – 32S/28Q/16D; Singles – Doubles	(France) Nicolas Mahut; 2–6, 7–6(6), 7–6(4)	(Bulgaria) Grigor Dimitrov	(France) Michaël Llodra (France) David Guez	(Germany) Björn Phau (Spain) Roberto Bautista Agut (France) Nicolas Renavand (Serbia) Ilija Bozoljac
October 18	2010 Open d'Orléans; Orléans, France; Regular series Hard (i) – €106,500+H – 32S/28Q/16D; Singles – Doubles	(France) Pierre-Hugues Herbert (France) Nicolas Renavand; 7–6(3), 1–6, [10–6]	(France) Sébastien Grosjean (France) Nicolas Mahut	(France) Michaël Llodra (France) David Guez	(Germany) Björn Phau (Spain) Roberto Bautista Agut (France) Nicolas Renavand (Serbia) Ilija Bozoljac
October 18	2010 Copa Petrobras Santiago; Santiago, Chile; Regular series Clay (red) – $100,000+H – 32S/13Q/16D; Singles – Doubles	(Italy) Fabio Fognini; 6–2, 7–6(2)	(Chile) Paul Capdeville	(Portugal) Rui Machado (France) Guillaume Rufin	(Brazil) Júlio Silva (Brazil) João Souza (Chile) Jorge Aguilar (Serbia) Nikola Ćirić
October 18	2010 Copa Petrobras Santiago; Santiago, Chile; Regular series Clay (red) – $100,000+H – 32S/13Q/16D; Singles – Doubles	(Spain) Daniel Muñoz de la Nava (Spain) Rubén Ramírez Hidalgo; 6–4, 6–2	(Serbia) Nikola Ćirić (Montenegro) Goran Tošić	(Portugal) Rui Machado (France) Guillaume Rufin	(Brazil) Júlio Silva (Brazil) João Souza (Chile) Jorge Aguilar (Serbia) Nikola Ćirić
October 18	2010 Calabasas Pro Tennis Championships; Calabasas, United States; Regular series Hard – $50,000 – 32S/32Q/16D/4Q; Singles – Doubles	(Australia) Marinko Matosevic; 2–6, 6–4, 6–3	(United States) Ryan Sweeting	(United States) Donald Young (United States) Robert Kendrick	(Bosnia and Herzegovina) Amer Delić (Denmark) Frederik Nielsen (United States) Ryan Harrison (United States) Lester Cook
October 18	2010 Calabasas Pro Tennis Championships; Calabasas, United States; Regular series Hard – $50,000 – 32S/32Q/16D/4Q; Singles – Doubles	(United States) Ryan Harrison (United States) Travis Rettenmaier; 6–3, 6–3	(South Africa) Rik de Voest (United States) Bobby Reynolds	(United States) Donald Young (United States) Robert Kendrick	(Bosnia and Herzegovina) Amer Delić (Denmark) Frederik Nielsen (United States) Ryan Harrison (United States) Lester Cook
October 25	2010 Copa Petrobras São Paulo; São Paulo, Brazil; Regular series Clay (red) – $75,000+H – 32S/28Q/16D; Singles – Doubles	(Brazil) Marcos Daniel; 6–1, 3–6, 6–3	(Brazil) Thomaz Bellucci	(Sweden) Christian Lindell (France) Nicolas Devilder	(Portugal) Leonardo Tavares (Kazakhstan) Yuri Schukin (Portugal) Rui Machado (Brazil) Rogério Dutra da Silva
October 25	2010 Copa Petrobras São Paulo; São Paulo, Brazil; Regular series Clay (red) – $75,000+H – 32S/28Q/16D; Singles – Doubles	(Brazil) Franco Ferreiro (Brazil) André Sá; 3–6, 7–6(2), [10–8]	(Portugal) Rui Machado (Spain) Daniel Muñoz de la Nava	(Sweden) Christian Lindell (France) Nicolas Devilder	(Portugal) Leonardo Tavares (Kazakhstan) Yuri Schukin (Portugal) Rui Machado (Brazil) Rogério Dutra da Silva

=== November ===
Week of	Tournament	Champion	Runner-up	Semifinalists	Quarterfinalists
November 1	2010 President's Cup; Astana, Kazakhstan; Regular series Hard (i) – $125,000+H – 32S/28Q/16D; Singles – Doubles	(Croatia) Ivan Dodig; 6–4, 6–3	(Russia) Igor Kunitsyn	(Russia) Konstantin Kravchuk (Germany) Rainer Schüttler	(Russia) Denis Matsukevich (Russia) Ilya Belyaev (Russia) Alexander Kudryavtsev (Croatia) Nikola Mektić
November 1	2010 President's Cup; Astana, Kazakhstan; Regular series Hard (i) – $125,000+H – 32S/28Q/16D; Singles – Doubles	(United Kingdom) Colin Fleming (United Kingdom) Ross Hutchins; 6–3, 7–6(10)	(Russia) Mikhail Elgin (Russia) Alexander Kudryavtsev	(Russia) Konstantin Kravchuk (Germany) Rainer Schüttler	(Russia) Denis Matsukevich (Russia) Ilya Belyaev (Russia) Alexander Kudryavtsev (Croatia) Nikola Mektić
November 1	2010 Seguros Bolívar Open Medellín; Medellín, Colombia; Regular series Clay – $50,000+H – 32S/28Q/16D; Singles – Doubles	(Brazil) Marcos Daniel; 6–3, 7–5	(Colombia) Juan Sebastián Cabal	(Colombia) Carlos Salamanca (Argentina) Carlos Berlocq	(Argentina) Horacio Zeballos (Portugal) Rui Machado (Portugal) Leonardo Tavares (Chile) Paul Capdeville
November 1	2010 Seguros Bolívar Open Medellín; Medellín, Colombia; Regular series Clay – $50,000+H – 32S/28Q/16D; Singles – Doubles	(Colombia) Juan Sebastián Cabal (Colombia) Robert Farah; 6–3, 7–5	(Brazil) Franco Ferreiro (Brazil) André Sá	(Colombia) Carlos Salamanca (Argentina) Carlos Berlocq	(Argentina) Horacio Zeballos (Portugal) Rui Machado (Portugal) Leonardo Tavares (Chile) Paul Capdeville
November 1	2010 Virginia National Bank Men's Pro Champs; Charlottesville, USA; Regular series Hard (i) – $50,000 – 32S/28Q/16D; Singles – Doubles	(United States) Robert Kendrick; 6–2, 6–3	(United States) Michael Shabaz	(South Africa) Rik de Voest (Australia) Chris Guccione	(Australia) Marinko Matosevic (United States) Donald Young (Japan) Kei Nishikori (India) Somdev Devvarman
November 1	2010 Virginia National Bank Men's Pro Champs; Charlottesville, USA; Regular series Hard (i) – $50,000 – 32S/28Q/16D; Singles – Doubles	(United States) Robert Kendrick (United States) Donald Young; 7–6(5), 7–6(3)	(United States) Ryler DeHeart (Canada) Pierre-Ludovic Duclos	(South Africa) Rik de Voest (Australia) Chris Guccione	(Australia) Marinko Matosevic (United States) Donald Young (Japan) Kei Nishikori (India) Somdev Devvarman
November 1	2010 Bauer Watertechnology Cup; Eckental, Germany; Regular series Carpet (i) – $30,000+H – 32S/28Q/16D; Singles – Doubles	(Netherlands) Igor Sijsling; 3–6, 6–2, 6–3	(Belgium) Ruben Bemelmans	(Germany) Dustin Brown (United Kingdom) Alex Bogdanovic	(Czech Republic) Lukáš Rosol (Luxembourg) Gilles Müller (Serbia) Ilija Bozoljac (Germany) Bastian Knittel
November 1	2010 Bauer Watertechnology Cup; Eckental, Germany; Regular series Carpet (i) – $30,000+H – 32S/28Q/16D; Singles – Doubles	(United States) Scott Lipsky (United States) Rajeev Ram; 6–7(2), 6–4, [10–4]	(Thailand) Sanchai Ratiwatana (Thailand) Sonchat Ratiwatana	(Germany) Dustin Brown (United Kingdom) Alex Bogdanovic	(Czech Republic) Lukáš Rosol (Luxembourg) Gilles Müller (Serbia) Ilija Bozoljac (Germany) Bastian Knittel
November 8	2010 Internazionali Tennis Val Gardena Südtirol; Urtijëi, Italy; Regular series Carpet (i) – $64,000+H – 32S/28Q/16D; Singles – Doubles	(Poland) Michał Przysiężny; 6–3, 7–5	(Slovakia) Lukáš Lacko	(Belarus) Uladzimir Ignatik (Italy) Simone Bolelli	(Uzbekistan) Farrukh Dustov (Austria) Martin Fischer (Austria) Alexander Peya (Slovakia) Karol Beck
November 8	2010 Internazionali Tennis Val Gardena Südtirol; Urtijëi, Italy; Regular series Carpet (i) – $64,000+H – 32S/28Q/16D; Singles – Doubles	(Russia) Mikhail Elgin (Russia) Alexander Kudryavtsev; 3–6, 6–3, [10–3]	(Poland) Tomasz Bednarek (Poland) Michał Przysiężny	(Belarus) Uladzimir Ignatik (Italy) Simone Bolelli	(Uzbekistan) Farrukh Dustov (Austria) Martin Fischer (Austria) Alexander Peya (Slovakia) Karol Beck
November 8	2010 Knoxville Challenger; Knoxville, USA; Regular series Hard (i) – $50,000+H – 32S/28Q/16D; Singles – Doubles	(Japan) Kei Nishikori; 6–1, 6–4	(United States) Robert Kendrick	(South Africa) Fritz Wolmarans (United States) Nicholas Monroe	(United States) Ryler DeHeart (South Africa) Rik de Voest (United States) Bobby Reynolds (United States) Jesse Witten
November 8	2010 Knoxville Challenger; Knoxville, USA; Regular series Hard (i) – $50,000+H – 32S/28Q/16D; Singles – Doubles	(South Africa) Rik de Voest (South Africa) Izak van der Merwe; 3–6, 6–3, [10–3]	(United States) Alex Bogomolov Jr. (United States) Alex Kuznetsov	(South Africa) Fritz Wolmarans (United States) Nicholas Monroe	(United States) Ryler DeHeart (South Africa) Rik de Voest (United States) Bobby Reynolds (United States) Jesse Witten
November 8	2010 Challenger Ciudad de Guayaquil; Guayaquil, Ecuador; Regular series Clay – $50,000 – 32S/28Q/16D; Singles – Doubles	(Chile) Paul Capdeville; 6–3, 3–6, 6–3	(Argentina) Diego Junqueira	(Argentina) Carlos Berlocq (Argentina) Máximo González	(France) Éric Prodon (Brazil) Marcos Daniel (Ecuador) Giovanni Lapentti (Brazil) Rogério Dutra da Silva
November 8	2010 Challenger Ciudad de Guayaquil; Guayaquil, Ecuador; Regular series Clay – $50,000 – 32S/28Q/16D; Singles – Doubles	(Colombia) Juan Sebastián Cabal (Colombia) Robert Farah; 7–5, 7–6(3)	(Brazil) Franco Ferreiro (Brazil) André Sá	(Argentina) Carlos Berlocq (Argentina) Máximo González	(France) Éric Prodon (Brazil) Marcos Daniel (Ecuador) Giovanni Lapentti (Brazil) Rogério Dutra da Silva
November 8	2010 Lambertz Open by STAWAG; Aachen, Germany; Regular series Carpet (i) – $42,500+H – 32S/28Q/16D; Singles – Doubles	(Germany) Dustin Brown; 6–3, 7–6(3)	(Netherlands) Igor Sijsling	(United States) Rajeev Ram (Belgium) Ruben Bemelmans	(France) Pierre-Hugues Herbert (Netherlands) Jesse Huta Galung (Slovenia) Blaž Kavčič (Slovakia) Andrej Martin
November 8	2010 Lambertz Open by STAWAG; Aachen, Germany; Regular series Carpet (i) – $42,500+H – 32S/28Q/16D; Singles – Doubles	(Belgium) Ruben Bemelmans (Netherlands) Igor Sijsling; 6–4, 3–6, [11–9]	(United Kingdom) Jamie Delgado (United Kingdom) Jonathan Marray	(United States) Rajeev Ram (Belgium) Ruben Bemelmans	(France) Pierre-Hugues Herbert (Netherlands) Jesse Huta Galung (Slovenia) Blaž Kavčič (Slovakia) Andrej Martin
November 8	2010 Aegon Pro-Series Loughborough; Loughborough, Great Britain; Regular series Hard (i) – $42,500+H – 32S/28Q/16D; Singles – Doubles	(Germany) Matthias Bachinger; 6–3, 3–6, 6–1	(Denmark) Frederik Nielsen	(Republic of Ireland) Conor Niland (United Kingdom) James Ward	(Germany) Björn Phau (Italy) Stefano Galvani (Austria) Andreas Haider-Maurer (Australia) Matthew Ebden
November 8	2010 Aegon Pro-Series Loughborough; Loughborough, Great Britain; Regular series Hard (i) – $42,500+H – 32S/28Q/16D; Singles – Doubles	(Finland) Henri Kontinen (Denmark) Frederik Nielsen; 6–2, 6–4	(Australia) Jordan Kerr (United Kingdom) Ken Skupski	(Republic of Ireland) Conor Niland (United Kingdom) James Ward	(Germany) Björn Phau (Italy) Stefano Galvani (Austria) Andreas Haider-Maurer (Australia) Matthew Ebden
November 15	2010 Ritro Slovak Open; Bratislava, Slovakia; Tretorn SERIE+ Hard (i) – $106,500+H – 32S/28Q/16D; Singles – Doubles	(Slovakia) Martin Kližan; 7–6(4), 6–2	(Austria) Stefan Koubek	(Russia) Igor Kunitsyn (Russia) Alexander Kudryavtsev	(Slovakia) Dominik Hrbatý (Lithuania) Ričardas Berankis (Slovakia) Marek Semjan (Russia) Mikhail Ledovskikh
November 15	2010 Ritro Slovak Open; Bratislava, Slovakia; Tretorn SERIE+ Hard (i) – $106,500+H – 32S/28Q/16D; Singles – Doubles	(United Kingdom) Colin Fleming (United Kingdom) Jamie Murray; 6–2, 3–6, [10–6]	(United States) Travis Parrott (Slovakia) Filip Polášek	(Russia) Igor Kunitsyn (Russia) Alexander Kudryavtsev	(Slovakia) Dominik Hrbatý (Lithuania) Ričardas Berankis (Slovakia) Marek Semjan (Russia) Mikhail Ledovskikh
November 15	2010 JSM Challenger of Champaign–Urbana; Champaign, USA; Regular series Hard (i) – $50,000+H – 32S/28Q/16D; Singles – Doubles	(United States) Alex Bogomolov Jr. 5–7, 7–6(7), 6–3	(Bosnia and Herzegovina) Amer Delić	(United States) Jesse Witten (United States) Bobby Reynolds	(United States) Steve Johnson (United States) Michael Yani (South Africa) Fritz Wolmarans (Australia) Peter Luczak
November 15	2010 JSM Challenger of Champaign–Urbana; Champaign, USA; Regular series Hard (i) – $50,000+H – 32S/28Q/16D; Singles – Doubles	(South Africa) Raven Klaasen (South Africa) Izak van der Merwe; 4–6, 7–6(2), [10–4]	(United States) Ryler DeHeart (Canada) Pierre-Ludovic Duclos	(United States) Jesse Witten (United States) Bobby Reynolds	(United States) Steve Johnson (United States) Michael Yani (South Africa) Fritz Wolmarans (Australia) Peter Luczak
November 15	2010 ATP Salzburg Indoors; Salzburg, Austria; Tretorn SERIE+ Hard (i) – $42,500+H – 32S/28Q/16D; Singles – Doubles	(Republic of Ireland) Conor Niland; 7–6(5), 6–7(2), 6–2	(Poland) Jerzy Janowicz	(Germany) Björn Phau (Slovakia) Karol Beck	(Germany) Dieter Kindlmann (Austria) Alexander Peya (Spain) Iván Navarro (Germany) Denis Gremelmayr
November 15	2010 ATP Salzburg Indoors; Salzburg, Austria; Tretorn SERIE+ Hard (i) – $42,500+H – 32S/28Q/16D; Singles – Doubles	(Austria) Alexander Peya (Austria) Martin Slanar; 7–6(1), 6–3	(Australia) Rameez Junaid (Germany) Frank Moser	(Germany) Björn Phau (Slovakia) Karol Beck	(Germany) Dieter Kindlmann (Austria) Alexander Peya (Spain) Iván Navarro (Germany) Denis Gremelmayr
November 15	2010 Abierto Int'l Varonil Casablanca Cancún; Cancún, Mexico; Regular series Clay – $35,000 – 32S/28Q/16D; Singles – Doubles	(Spain) Pere Riba; 6–4, 6–0	(Argentina) Carlos Berlocq	(France) Éric Prodon (Spain) Rubén Ramírez Hidalgo	(Argentina) Horacio Zeballos (Argentina) Brian Dabul (Italy) Andrea Arnaboldi (Argentina) Facundo Bagnis
November 15	2010 Abierto Int'l Varonil Casablanca Cancún; Cancún, Mexico; Regular series Clay – $35,000 – 32S/28Q/16D; Singles – Doubles	(Dominican Republic) Víctor Estrella (Mexico) Santiago González; 6–1, 7–6(3)	(Austria) Rainer Eitzinger (Mexico) César Ramírez	(France) Éric Prodon (Spain) Rubén Ramírez Hidalgo	(Argentina) Horacio Zeballos (Argentina) Brian Dabul (Italy) Andrea Arnaboldi (Argentina) Facundo Bagnis
November 22	2010 IPP Open; Helsinki, Finland; Regular series Hard (i) – $106,500 – 32S/28Q/16D; Singles – Doubles	(Lithuania) Ričardas Berankis; 6–1, 2–0, RET.	(Poland) Michał Przysiężny	(Bulgaria) Grigor Dimitrov (France) Adrian Mannarino	(Germany) Julian Reister (Canada) Frank Dancevic (Finland) Henri Kontinen (Estonia) Jürgen Zopp
November 22	2010 IPP Open; Helsinki, Finland; Regular series Hard (i) – $106,500 – 32S/28Q/16D; Singles – Doubles	(Germany) Dustin Brown (Germany) Martin Emmrich; 7–6(17), 0–6, [10–7]	(Finland) Henri Kontinen (Finland) Jarkko Nieminen	(Bulgaria) Grigor Dimitrov (France) Adrian Mannarino	(Germany) Julian Reister (Canada) Frank Dancevic (Finland) Henri Kontinen (Estonia) Jürgen Zopp
November 22	2010 Copa Topper; Buenos Aires, Argentina; Regular series Clay – $75,000+H – 32S/28Q/16D; Singles – Doubles	(Argentina) Diego Junqueira; 6–1, 6–2	(Argentina) Juan Pablo Brzezicki	(Argentina) Carlos Berlocq (Argentina) Andrés Molteni	(Serbia) Nikola Ćirić (Argentina) Brian Dabul (Brazil) Eládio Ribeiro Neto (Brazil) Júlio Silva
November 22	2010 Copa Topper; Buenos Aires, Argentina; Regular series Clay – $75,000+H – 32S/28Q/16D; Singles – Doubles	(Argentina) Carlos Berlocq (Argentina) Brian Dabul; 7–6(4), 6–3	(Argentina) Andrés Molteni (Argentina) Guido Pella	(Argentina) Carlos Berlocq (Argentina) Andrés Molteni	(Serbia) Nikola Ćirić (Argentina) Brian Dabul (Brazil) Eládio Ribeiro Neto (Brazil) Júlio Silva
November 22	2010 Dunlop World Challenge; Toyota, Japan; Regular series Carpet (i) – $35,000+H – 32S/28Q/16D; Singles – Doubles	(Japan) Tatsuma Ito; 6–4, 6–2	(Japan) Yūichi Sugita	(Japan) Go Soeda (Japan) Hiroki Kondo	(Japan) Takao Suzuki (Australia) Bernard Tomic (Switzerland) Alexander Sadecky (Finland) Juho Paukku
November 22	2010 Dunlop World Challenge; Toyota, Japan; Regular series Carpet (i) – $35,000+H – 32S/28Q/16D; Singles – Doubles	(Philippines) Treat Conrad Huey (India) Purav Raja; 6–1, 6–2	(Japan) Tasuku Iwami (Japan) Hiroki Kondo	(Japan) Go Soeda (Japan) Hiroki Kondo	(Japan) Takao Suzuki (Australia) Bernard Tomic (Switzerland) Alexander Sadecky (Finland) Juho Paukku

=== December ===
No events that month.

== Statistical information ==
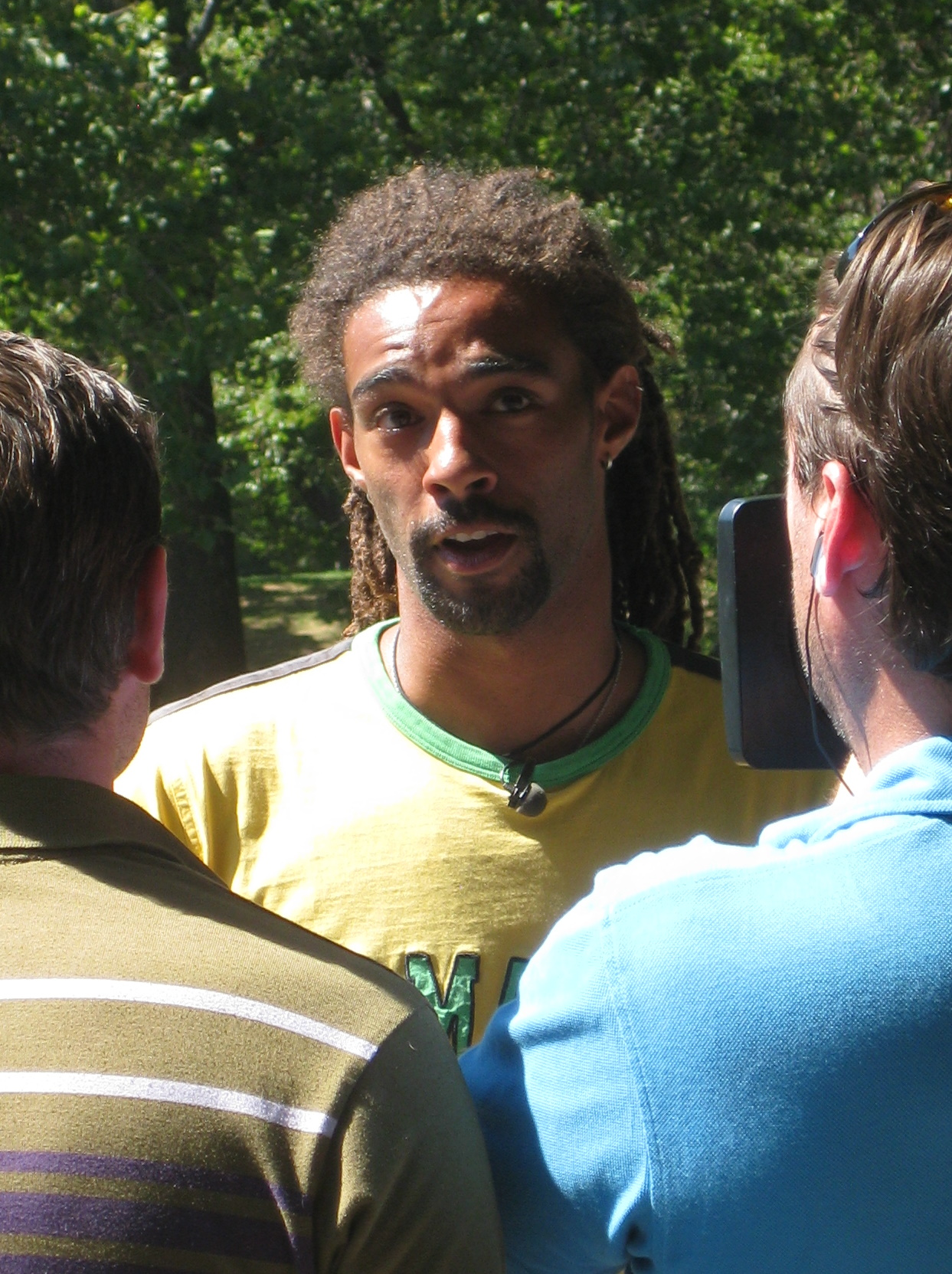
Dustin Brown, 2010 ATP Challenger Tour title-leader swept eight titles (six as the representative of Jamaica and two as the representative of Germany).

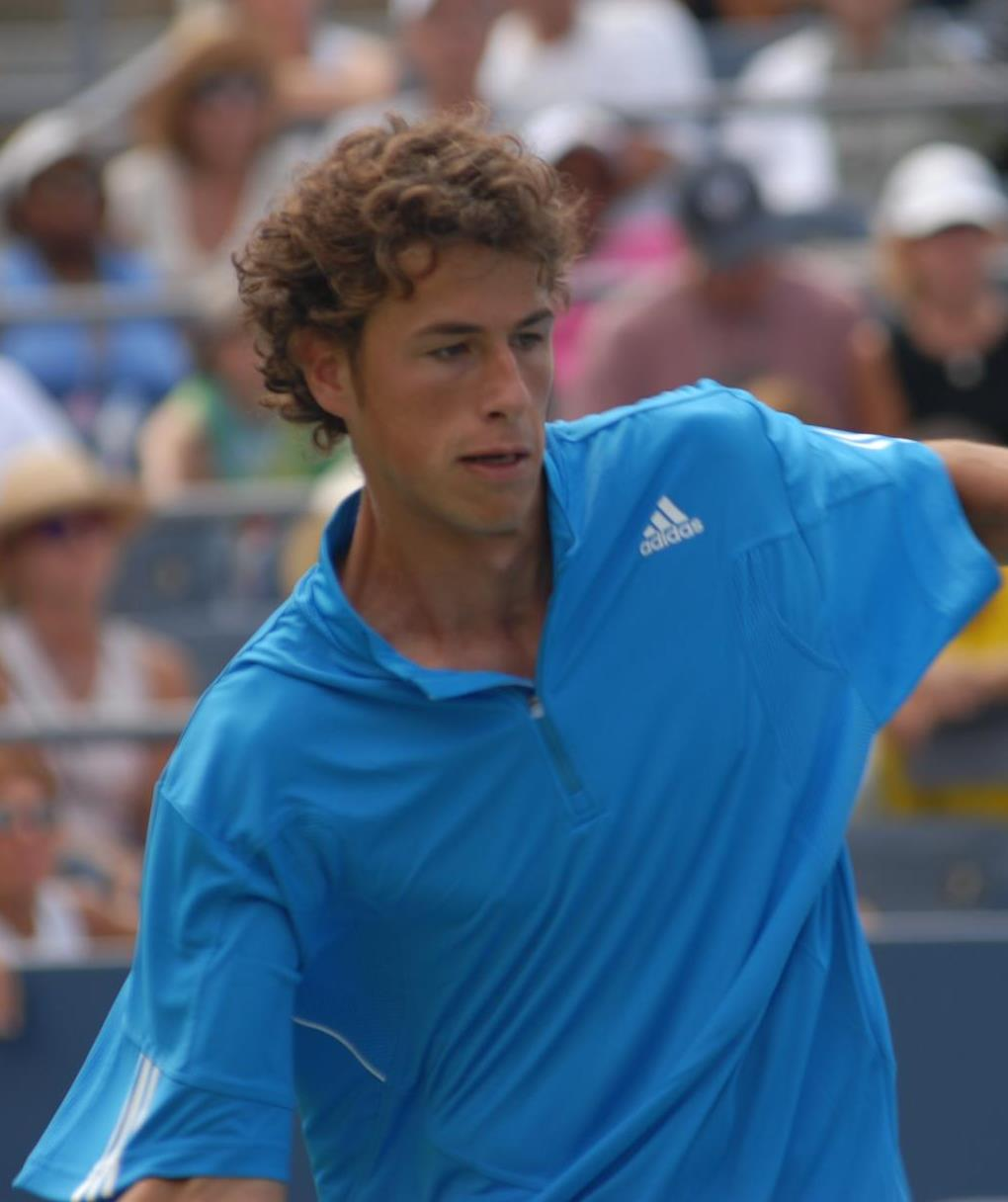
Robin Haase clinched five singles (in Caltanisetta, Fürth, City of San Marino, Manerbio and Como) and two doubles (Cordenons and Manerbio) titles.

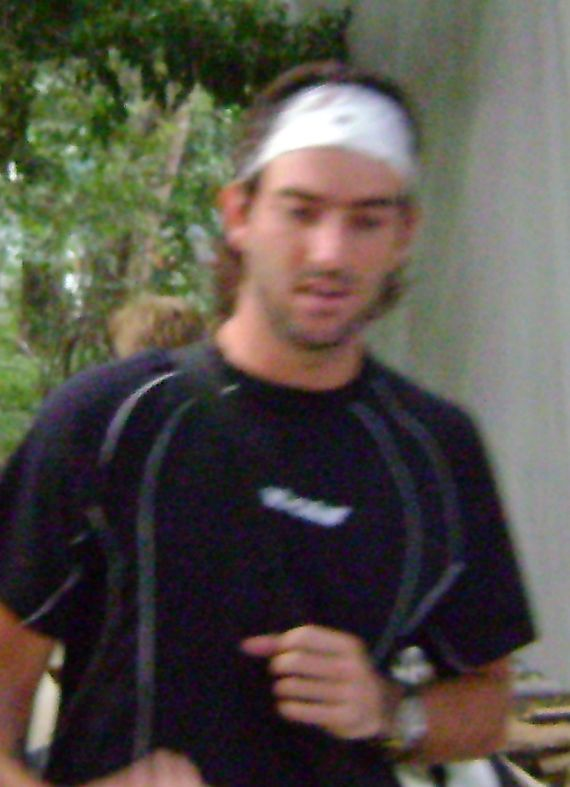
Franco Ferreiro was the best doubles player in this season. He won in eight tournaments (among others in Scheveningen and Segovia).

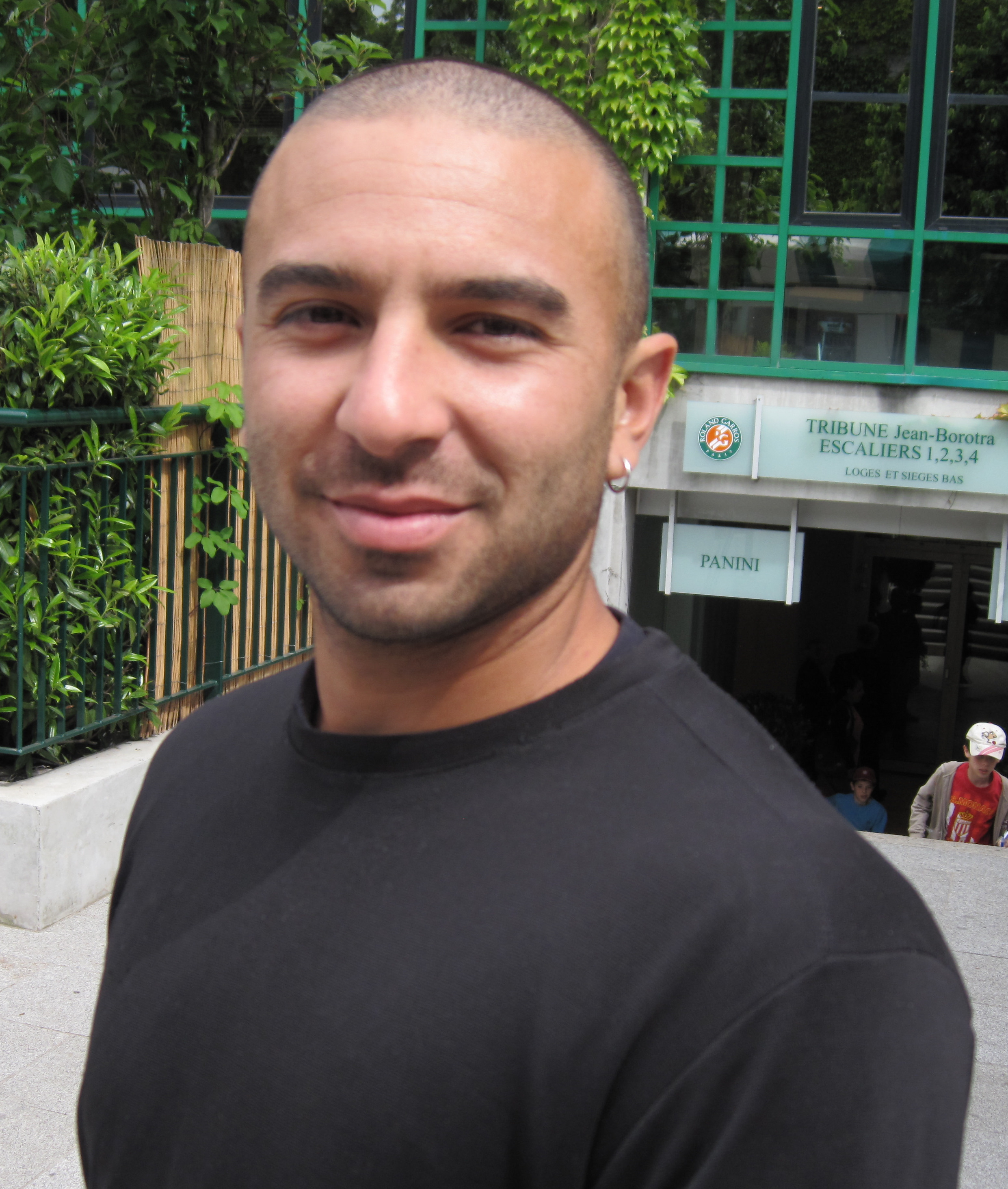
Brian Dabul triumphed in six tournaments (singles titles in Salinas and Tallahassee).

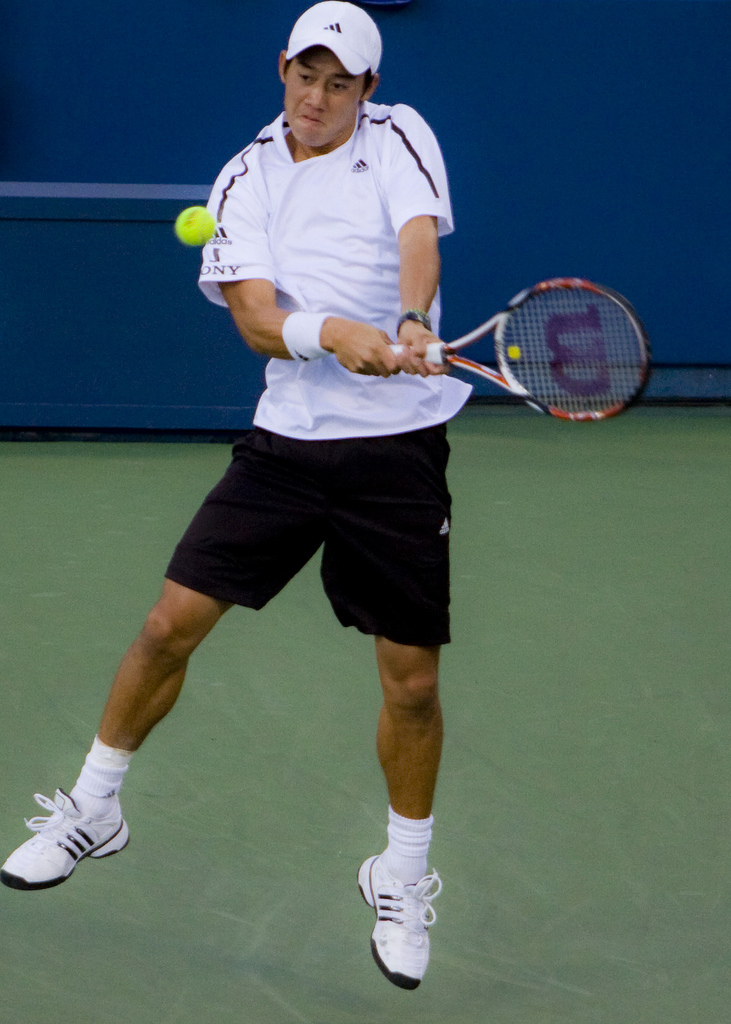
Kei Nishikori, who decided to come back from his knee injury last year, won four singles titles (the best result, apart from Haase) in the United States.

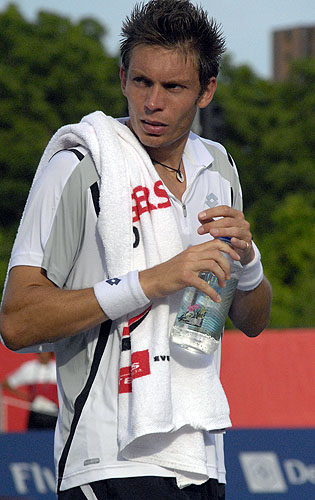
Nicolas Mahut swept the Cherbourg challenger, winning both singles and doubles titles.

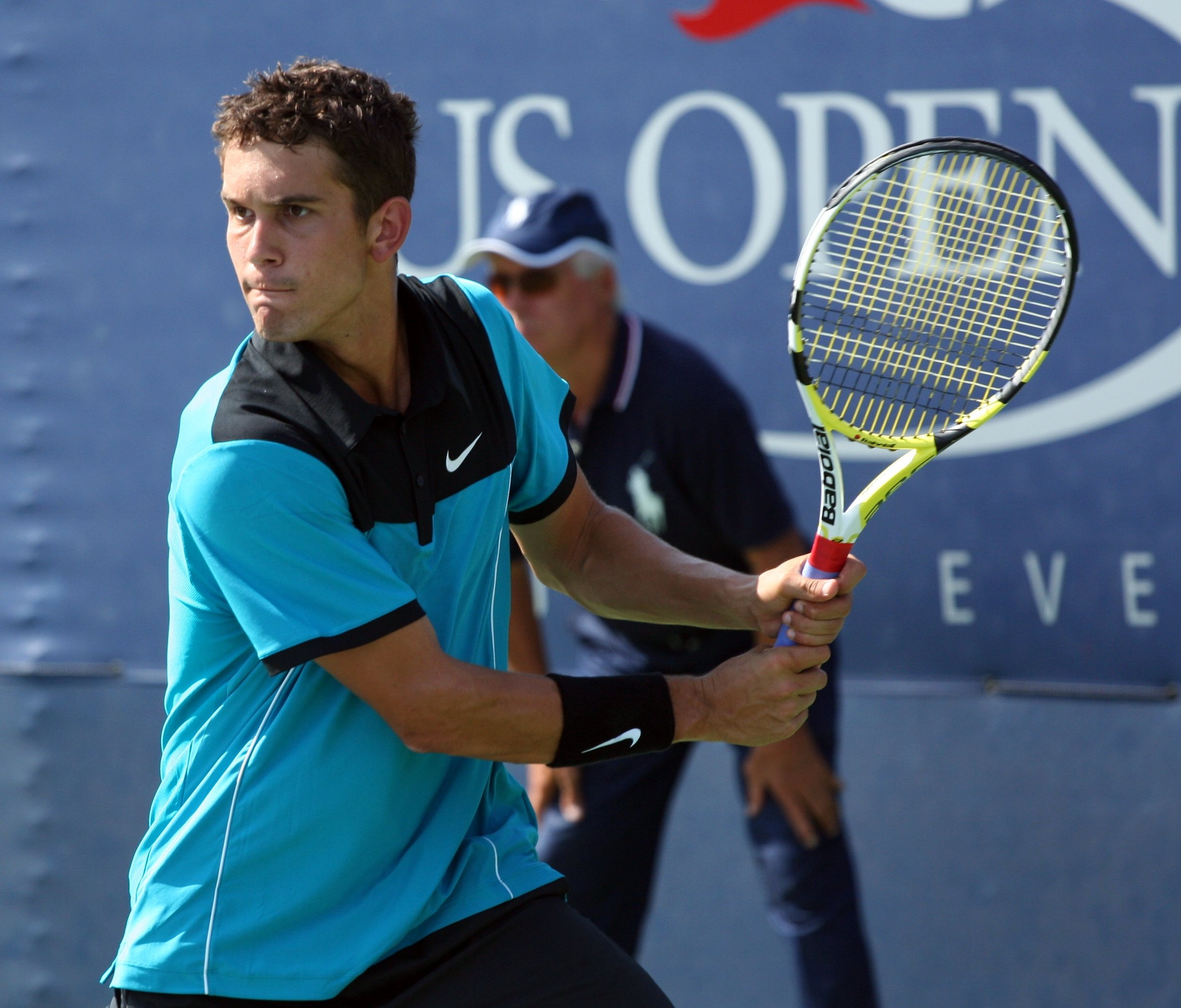
Ryan Sweeting claimed the Dallas singles title for the second consecutive year.

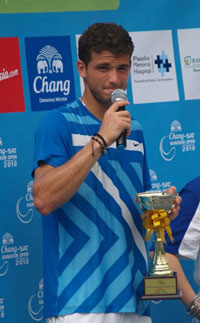
The Bulgarian Grigor Dimitrov with his second Challenger title in Bangkok. He won both editions of Chang-Sat Bangkok Open.

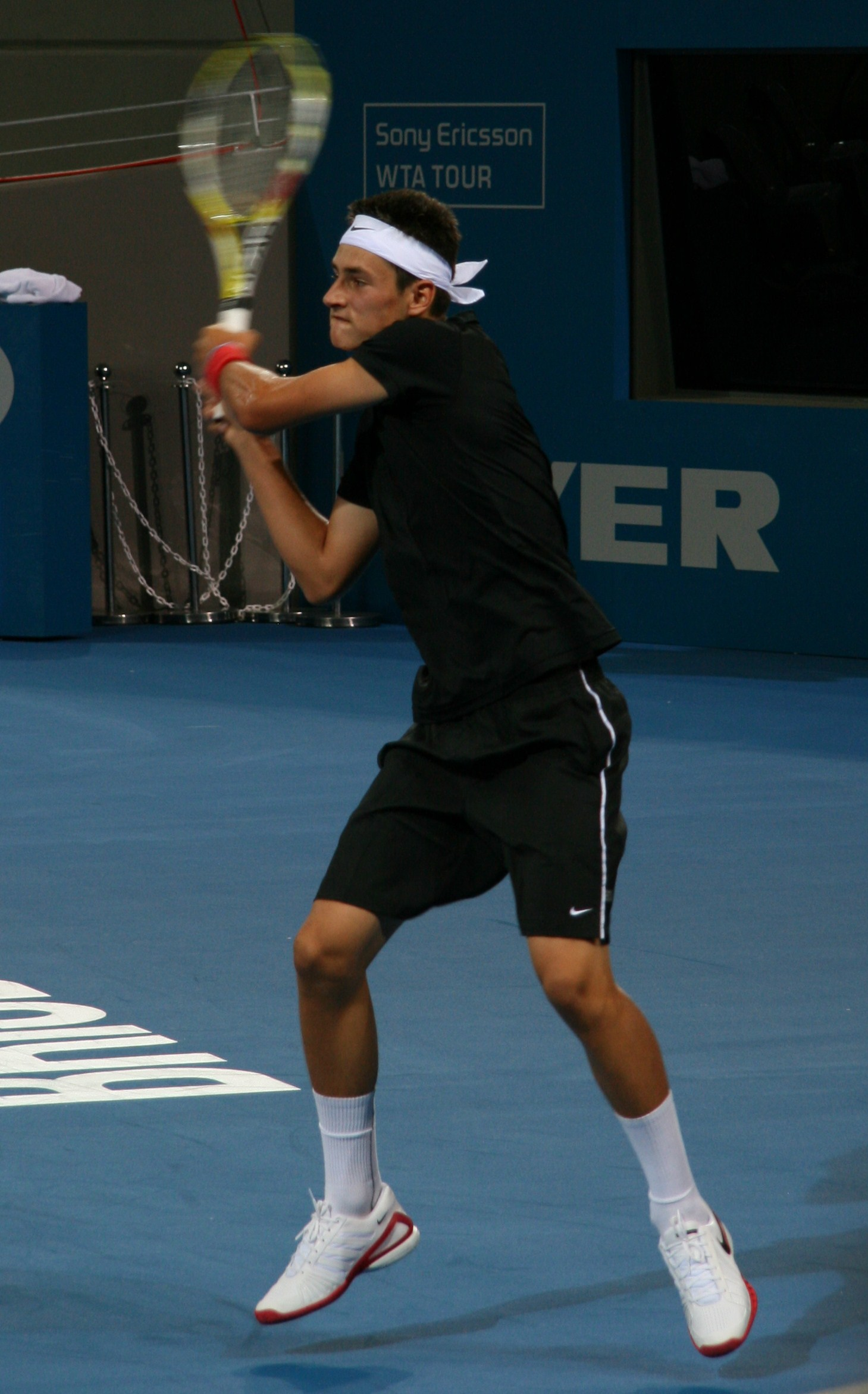
Seventeen-year-old Bernard Tomic won his second Challenger title in Burnie.

These tables present the number of singles (S) and doubles (D) titles won by each player and each nation during the season, within all the tournament categories of the 2010 ATP Challenger Tour: the Tretorn SERIE+ tournaments, and the regular series tournaments. The players/nations are sorted by: 1) total number of titles; 2) cumulated importance of those titles (one Tretorn SERIE+ win > one regular tournament win); 3) a singles > doubles hierarchy; 4) alphabetical order (by family names for players).

=== Titles won by player ===
Total	Player	Tretorn SERIE+		Regular series		Total	
Total	Player	S	D	S	D	S	D
8	(Jamaica) /Dustin Brown (GER) ^{1}		● ●	● ●	● ● ● ●	2	6
8	Franco Ferreiro (BRA)		● ●		● ● ● ● ● ●	0	8
7	Robin Haase (NED)	●	●	● ● ● ●	●	5	2
7	Carlos Berlocq (ARG)		●	● ● ●	● ● ●	3	4
6	Rubén Ramírez Hidalgo (ESP)	●		● ●	● ● ●	3	3
6	Brian Dabul (ARG)			● ●	● ● ● ●	2	4
6	Nicolas Mahut (FRA)			● ●	● ● ● ●	2	4
6	Édouard Roger-Vasselin (FRA)			●	● ● ● ● ●	1	5
5	Pere Riba (ESP)			● ● ●	● ●	3	2
5	Daniel Muñoz de la Nava (ESP)		●		● ● ● ●	0	5
5	Lovro Zovko (CRO)		●		● ● ● ●	0	5
5	Santiago González (MEX)			●	● ● ● ●	1	4
5	Izak van der Merwe (RSA)			●	● ● ● ●	1	4
5	David Marrero (ESP)				● ● ● ● ●	0	5
5	Philipp Oswald (AUT)				● ● ● ● ●	0	5
5	André Sá (BRA)				● ● ● ● ●	0	5
5	Santiago Ventura (ESP)				● ● ● ● ●	0	5
4	Denis Gremelmayr (GER)	● ●		●	●	3	1
4	Karol Beck (SVK)	●		● ●	●	3	1
4	Kei Nishikori (JPN)			● ● ● ●		4	0
4	Fabio Fognini (ITA)			● ● ●	●	3	1
4	Daniele Bracciali (ITA)		●		● ● ●	0	4
4	Jamie Murray (GBR)		●		● ● ●	0	4
4	Martin Slanar (AUT)		●		● ● ●	0	4
4	Rik de Voest (RSA)			●	● ● ●	1	3
4	Robert Farah (COL)			●	● ● ●	1	3
4	Martin Fischer (AUT)			●	● ● ●	1	3
4	Dominik Meffert (GER)			●	● ● ●	1	3
4	Simone Vagnozzi (ITA)			●	● ● ●	1	3
4	Ryler DeHeart (USA)				● ● ● ●	0	4
4	Michail Elgin (RUS)				● ● ● ●	0	4
4	Rameez Junaid (AUS)				● ● ● ●	0	4
4	Frank Moser (GER)				● ● ● ●	0	4
4	Leonardo Tavares (POR)				● ● ● ●	0	4
3	Rui Machado (POR)		●	● ●		2	1
3	Marcos Daniel (BRA)			● ● ●		3	0
3	Grigor Dimitrov (BUL)			● ● ●		3	0
3	Blaž Kavčič (SLO)			● ● ●		3	0
3	Michał Przysiężny (POL)			● ● ●		3	0
3	Rogier Wassen (NED)		● ●		●	0	3
3	Frederico Gil (POR)		●	●	●	1	2
3	Marcel Granollers (ESP)		●	●	●	1	2
3	Lu Yen-hsun (TPE)			● ●	●	2	1
3	Ilija Bozoljac (SRB)		●		● ●	0	3
3	Colin Fleming (GBR)		●		● ●	0	3
3	Alexander Peya (AUT)		●		● ●	0	3
3	Ivan Dodig (CRO)			●	● ●	1	2
3	Robert Kendrick (USA)			●	● ●	1	2
3	Lukáš Rosol (CZE)			●	● ●	1	2
3	Flavio Cipolla (ITA)				● ● ●	0	3
3	Andre Begemann (GER)				● ● ●	0	3
3	Juan Sebastián Cabal (COL)				● ● ●	0	3
3	Pierre-Ludovic Duclos (CAN)				● ● ●	0	3
3	Martin Emmrich (GER)				● ● ●	0	3
3	Treat Conrad Huey (PHI)				● ● ●	0	3
3	Scott Lipsky (USA)				● ● ●	0	3
3	Travis Rettenmaier (USA)				● ● ●	0	3
3	Joseph Sirianni (AUS)				● ● ●	0	3
2	Conor Niland (IRL)	● ●				2	0
2	Adrian Mannarino (FRA)	●		●		2	0
2	Dudi Sela (ISR)	●		●		2	0
2	Steve Darcis (BEL)	●			●	1	1
2	Ričardas Berankis (LTU)			● ●		2	0
2	Máximo González (ARG)			● ●		2	0
2	Jesse Huta Galung (NED)			● ●		2	0
2	Tatsuma Ito (JPN)			● ●		2	0
2	Tobias Kamke (GER)			● ●		2	0
2	Mikhail Kukushkin (KAZ)			● ●		2	0
2	Marinko Matosevic (AUS)			● ●		2	0
2	Florian Mayer (GER)			● ●		2	0
2	Ricardo Mello (BRA)			● ●		2	0
2	Björn Phau (GER)			● ●		2	0
2	Éric Prodon (FRA)			● ●		2	0
2	Albert Ramos Viñolas (ESP)			● ●		2	0
2	Bobby Reynolds (USA)			● ●		2	0
2	João Souza (BRA)			● ●		2	0
2	Filippo Volandri (ITA)			● ●		2	0
2	Jamie Delgado (GBR)		●		●	0	2
2	Filip Polášek (SVK)		●		●	0	2
2	Kevin Anderson (RSA)			●	●	1	1
2	Pablo Andújar (ESP)			●	●	1	1
2	Matthias Bachinger (GER)			●	●	1	1
2	Carsten Ball (AUS)			●	●	1	1
2	Rogério Dutra da Silva (BRA)			●	●	1	1
2	Diego Junqueira (ARG)			●	●	1	1
2	Paolo Lorenzi (ITA)			●	●	1	1
2	Yuri Schukin (KAZ)			●	●	1	1
2	Igor Sijsling (NED)			●	●	1	1
2	Donald Young (USA)			●	●	1	1
2	Brian Battistone (USA)				● ●	0	2
2	James Cerretani (USA)				● ●	0	2
2	Alessio di Mauro (ITA)				● ●	0	2
2	Matthew Ebden (AUS)				● ●	0	2
2	Thomas Fabbiano (ITA)				● ●	0	2
2	Gong Maoxin (CHN)				● ●	0	2
2	Stephen Huss (AUS)				● ●	0	2
2	Ross Hutchins (GBR)				● ●	0	2
2	Dominic Inglot (GBR)				● ●	0	2
2	Raven Klaasen (RSA)				● ●	0	2
2	Li Zhe (CHN)				● ●	0	2
2	Jonathan Marray (GBR)				● ●	0	2
2	David Martin (USA)				● ●	0	2
2	Nikolaus Moser (AUT)				● ●	0	2
2	Frederik Nielsen (DEN)				● ●	0	2
2	Sanchai Ratiwatana (THA)				● ●	0	2
2	Sonchat Ratiwatana (THA)				● ●	0	2
2	Adil Shamasdin (CAN)				● ●	0	2
2	Artem Sitak (RUS)				● ●	0	2
2	Ken Skupski (GBR)				● ●	0	2
2	David Škoch (CZE)				● ●	0	2
1	José Acasuso (ARG)	●				1	0
1	Simone Bolelli (ITA)	●				1	0
1	Pablo Cuevas (URU)	●				1	0
1	Daniel Gimeno Traver (ESP)	●				1	0
1	Martin Kližan (SVK)	●				1	0
1	Stanislas Wawrinka (SUI)	●				1	0
1	Thiago Alves (BRA)		●			0	1
1	Jeff Coetzee (RSA)		●			0	1
1	Jonathan Erlich (ISR)		●			0	1
1	Gerard Granollers Pujol (ESP)		●			0	1
1	Harsh Mankad (IND)		●			0	1
1	Andy Ram (ISR)		●			0	1
1	Simon Stadler (GER)		●			0	1
1	Kristof Vliegen (BEL)		●			0	1
1	Igor Zelenay (SVK)		●			0	1
1	Attila Balázs (HUN)			●		1	0
1	Michael Berrer (GER)			●		1	0
1	Alex Bogomolov Jr. (USA)			●		1	0
1	Stéphane Bohli (SUI)			●		1	0
1	Paul Capdeville (CHI)			●		1	0
1	Daniel Brands (GER)			●		1	0
1	Federico del Bonis (ARG)			●		1	0
1	Somdev Devvarman (IND)			●		1	0
1	Alexandr Dolgopolov (UKR)			●		1	0
1	Richard Gasquet (FRA)			●		1	0
1	Gastón Gaudio (ARG)			●		1	0
1	Marc Gicquel (FRA)			●		1	0
1	Santiago Giraldo (COL)			●		1	0
1	David Guez (FRA)			●		1	0
1	Jan Hájek (CZE)			●		1	0
1	Jan Hernych (CZE)			●		1	0
1	Marsel İlhan (TUR)			●		1	0
1	Jerzy Janowicz (POL)			●		1	0
1	Evgeny Kirillov (RUS)			●		1	0
1	Igor Kunitsyn (RUS)			●		1	0
1	Giovanni Lapentti (ECU)			●		1	0
1	Lim Yong-kyu (KOR)			●		1	0
1	Andrej Martin (SVK)			●		1	0
1	John Millman (AUS)			●		1	0
1	Ivo Minář (CZE)			●		1	0
1	Jarkko Nieminen (FIN)			●		1	0
1	Jaroslav Pospíšil (CZE)			●		1	0
1	Stéphane Robert (FRA)			●		1	0
1	Michael Russell (USA)			●		1	0
1	Carlos Salamanca (COL)			●		1	0
1	Eduardo Schwank (ARG)			●		1	0
1	Andreas Seppi (ITA)			●		1	0
1	Ivan Sergeyev (UKR)			●		1	0
1	Franko Škugor (CRO)			●		1	0
1	Tim Smyczek (USA)			●		1	0
1	Go Soeda (JPN)			●		1	0
1	Yuichi Sugita (JPN)			●		1	0
1	Ryan Sweeting (USA)			●		1	0
1	Bernard Tomic (AUS)			●		1	0
1	Mario Ančić (CRO)				●	0	1
1	Andrew Anderson (RSA)				●	0	1
1	Jamie Baker (GBR)				●	0	1
1	Tomasz Bednarek (POL)				●	0	1
1	Ilya Belyaev (RUS)				●	0	1
1	Ruben Bemelmans (BEL)				●	0	1
1	Rohan Bopanna (IND)				●	0	1
1	Martin Damm (CZE)				●	0	1
1	Giulio Di Meo (ITA)				●	0	1
1	Nicolas Devilder (FRA)				●	0	1
1	Farrukh Dustov (UZB)				●	0	1
1	Víctor Estrella (DOM)				●	0	1
1	Brendan Evans (USA)				●	0	1
1	Leoš Friedl (CZE)				●	0	1
1	Daniel Garza (MEX)				●	0	1
1	Daniele Giorgini (ITA)				●	0	1
1	Rodrigo-Antonio Grilli (BRA)				●	0	1
1	Samuel Groth (AUS)				●	0	1
1	Chris Guccione (AUS)				●	0	1
1	Ryan Harrison (USA)				●	0	1
1	Kaden Hensel (AUS)				●	0	1
1	Pierre-Hugues Herbert (FRA)				●	0	1
1	Adam Hubble (AUS)				●	0	1
1	Uladzimir Ignatik (BLR)				●	0	1
1	Andis Juška (LAT)				●	0	1
1	Leonardo Kirche (BRA)				●	0	1
1	Ivo Klec (SVK)				●	0	1
1	Henri Kontinen (FIN)				●	0	1
1	Mateusz Kowalczyk (POL)				●	0	1
1	Gero Kretschmer (GER)				●	0	1
1	Alexandre Kudryavtsev (RUS)				●	0	1
1	Toshihide Matsui (JPN)				●	0	1
1	Miloslav Mečíř Jr. (SVK)				●	0	1
1	Nikola Mektić (CRO)				●	0	1
1	Jan Mertl (CZE)				●	0	1
1	Nicholas Monroe (USA)				●	0	1
1	Alessandro Motti (ITA)				●	0	1
1	Gilles Müller (LUX)				●	0	1
1	Eric Nunez (USA)				●	0	1
1	Deniss Pavlovs (LAT)				●	0	1
1	Guillermo Olaso (ESP)				●	0	1
1	Sergio Pérez-Pérez (ESP)				●	0	1
1	Vasek Pospisil (CAN)				●	0	1
1	Sebastián Prieto (ARG)				●	0	1
1	Purav Raja (IND)				●	0	1
1	Rajeev Ram (USA)				●	0	1
1	Nicolas Renavand (FRA)				●	0	1
1	Christophe Rochus (BEL)				●	0	1
1	Alex Satschko (GER)				●	0	1
1	Thomas Schoorel (NED)				●	0	1
1	Marek Semjan (SVK)				●	0	1
1	Júlio Silva (BRA)				●	0	1
1	Artem Smirnov (UKR)				●	0	1
1	João Sousa (POR)				●	0	1
1	Bertram Steinberger (AUT)				●	0	1
1	Horia Tecău (ROU)				●	0	1
1	Matteo Trevisan (ITA)				●	0	1
1	Gabriel Trujillo Soler (ESP)				●	0	1
1	Adrian Ungur (ROU)				●	0	1
1	Martín Vassallo Argüello (ARG)				●	0	1
1	Dušan Vemić (SRB)				●	0	1
1	James Ward (GBR)				●	0	1
1	Jesse Witten (USA)				●	0	1
1	Fritz Wolmarans (RSA)				●	0	1
1	Ivan Zovko (CRO)				●	0	1

=== Titles won by nation ===
Total	Nation	Tretorn SERIE+		Regular series		Total	
Total	Nation	S	D	S	D	S	D
38	Spain (ESP)	1	3	9	25	10	28
33	United States (USA)			8	25	8	25
32	Germany (GER)	2	1	11	18	13	19
28	Italy (ITA)	1	1	7	19	8	20
26	Brazil (BRA)		3	8	15	8	18
23	Argentina (ARG)	1	1	11	10	12	11
23	France (FRA)	1		10	12	11	12
21	Australia (AUS)			5	16	5	16
19	Great Britain (GBR)		3		16	0	19
19	Austria (AUT)		2	1	16	1	18
16	South Africa (RSA)		1	3	12	3	13
15	Netherlands (NED)	1	3	7	4	8	7
12	Czech Republic (CZE)			5	7	5	7
12	Croatia (CRO)		1	2	9	2	10
11	Slovakia (SVK)	2	2	3	4	5	6
10	Portugal (POR)		2	3	5	3	7
10	Russia (RUS)			2	8	2	8
9	Japan (JPN)			8	1	8	1
9	Colombia (COL)			3	6	3	6
6	Poland (POL)			4	2	4	2
6	Jamaica (JAM)		2	1	3	1	5
6	Mexico (MEX)			1	5	1	5
6	Canada (CAN)				6	0	6
5	Belgium (BEL)	1	1		3	1	4
4	Israel (ISR)	1	2	1		2	2
4	Kazakhstan (KAZ)			3	1	3	1
4	India (IND)		1	1	2	1	3
4	Serbia (SRB)		1		3	0	4
4	China (CHN)				4	0	4
4	Thailand (THA)				4	0	4
3	Bulgaria (BUL)			3		3	0
3	Slovenia (SLO)			3		3	0
3	Chinese Taipei (TPE)			2	1	2	1
3	Ukraine (UKR)			2	1	2	1
3	Philippines (PHI)				3	0	3
2	Ireland (IRL)	2				2	0
2	Switzerland (SUI)	1		1		2	0
2	Lithuania (LTU)			2		2	0
2	Finland (FIN)			1	1	1	1
2	Denmark (DEN)				2	0	2
2	Latvia (LAT)				2	0	2
2	Romania (ROU)				2	0	2
1	Uruguay (URU)	1				1	0
1	Chile (CHI)			1		1	0
1	Ecuador (ECU)			1		1	0
1	Hungary (HUN)			1		1	0
1	South Korea (KOR)			1		1	0
1	Turkey (TUR)			1		1	0
1	Belarus (BLR)				1	0	1
1	Dominican Republic (DOM)				1	0	1
1	Luxembourg (LUX)				1	0	1
1	Uzbekistan (UZB)				1	0	1

^{1} In October 2010 Dustin Brown decided to play under the German flag. He won six titles as a representative of Jamaica.

== Point distribution ==
Points are awarded as follows:

Tournament Category	W	F	SF (3rd/4th)	QF	R16	R32	Additional qualifying points
Challenger $125,000 +H	125	75	45	25	10		5
Challenger $125,000	110	65	40	20	9		5
Challenger $100,000	100	60	35	18	8		5
Challenger $75,000	90	55	33	17	8		5
Challenger $50,000	80	48	29	15	7		3
Challenger $35,000 +H	80	48	29	15	6		3

== See also ==
- International Tennis Federation
