= 2018 Città di Como Challenger – Singles =

Singles
- 2018 Città di Como Challenger

Final
- Champion: (Italy) Salvatore Caruso
- Runner-up: (Chile) Cristian Garín
- Score: 7–5, 6–4

Events
Singles	Doubles
← 2017 ·	Città di Como Challenger	· 2019 →

Pedro Sousa was the defending champion but lost in the first round to Cristian Garín.

Salvatore Caruso won the title after defeating Garín 7–5, 6–4 in the final.

== Seeds ==
1. (Slovakia) Martin Kližan (quarterfinals)
2. (Bolivia) Hugo Dellien (first round)
3. (Portugal) Pedro Sousa (first round)
4. (Brazil) Thiago Monteiro (first round)
5. (Argentina) Juan Ignacio Londero (quarterfinals)
6. (France) Stéphane Robert (first round)
7. (Portugal) Gastão Elias (first round)
8. (Brazil) Rogério Dutra Silva (first round)

== Draw ==
=== Key ===
- Q = Qualifier
- WC = Wild card
- LL = Lucky loser
- Alt = Alternate
- SE = Special exempt
- PR = Protected ranking
- ITF = ITF entry
- JE = Junior exempt
- w/o = Walkover
- r = Retired
- d = Defaulted
- SR = Special ranking

=== Finals ===
Semifinals
(Croatia) Viktor Galović	4	3
(Chile) Cristian Garín	6	6
(Italy) Matteo Donati	6^{6}	6^{4}
(Italy) Salvatore Caruso	7^{8}	7^{7}

Final
(Chile) Cristian Garín	5	4
(Italy) Salvatore Caruso	7	6

=== Top half ===
First round
1/Alt	(Slovakia) M Kližan	6	6
(Italy) A Giannessi	2	4
(Slovakia) A Martin	6	6
WC	(Italy) J Sinner	3	2
WC	(Italy) Alessandro Coppini	2	2
(Croatia) V Galović	6	6
(Italy) L Giustino	6	6
6	(France) S Robert	2	1
3	(Portugal) P Sousa	4	6^{3}
(Chile) C Garín	6	7^{7}
(Bosnia and Herzegovina) T Brkić	6	4
(Russia) I Nedelko	2	1^{r}
(Croatia) A Pavić	3	3
Q	(Germany) D Brown	6	6
Q	(Italy) G Mager	4	7^{10}	6^{5}
5	(Argentina) JI Londero	6	6^{8}	7^{7}

Second round
1/Alt	(Slovakia) M Kližan	6	1
(Slovakia) A Martin	3	0^{r}
(Croatia) V Galović	4	7	7
(Italy) L Giustino	6	5	5
(Chile) C Garín	6	6
(Bosnia and Herzegovina) T Brkić	4	4
Q	(Germany) D Brown	5	2
5	(Argentina) JI Londero	7	6

Quarterfinals
1/Alt	(Slovakia) M Kližan	6^{6}	0
(Croatia) V Galović	7^{8}	6
(Chile) C Garín	6	6
5	(Argentina) JI Londero	4	2

Semifinals
(Croatia) V Galović	4	3
(Chile) C Garín	6	6

=== Bottom half ===
First round
8	(Brazil) R Dutra Silva	0	4
(Italy) M Donati	6	6
Q	(Argentina) F Coria	7^{7}	6
(Spain) D Gimeno Traver	6^{2}	4
(Italy) GM Moroni	6	6
(Czech Republic) Z Kolář	2	2
WC	(Italy) F Baldi	6	2	6
4	(Brazil) T Monteiro	3	6	4
7	(Portugal) G Elias	5	6	3
(Italy) S Caruso	7	3	6
(Slovakia) F Horanský	6	6
WC	(Italy) F Forti	4	1
(Italy) A Arnaboldi	6	4	6^{5}
LL	(Italy) R Marcora	2	6	7^{7}
Q	(Argentina) F Argüello	6	6
2	(Bolivia) H Dellien	4	3

Second round
(Italy) M Donati	7^{7}	2
Q	(Argentina) F Coria	6^{4}	0^{r}
(Italy) GM Moroni	6^{3}	3
WC	(Italy) F Baldi	7^{7}	6
(Italy) S Caruso	6	1	7
(Slovakia) F Horanský	2	6	5
LL	(Italy) R Marcora	7^{7}	1	3
Q	(Argentina) F Argüello	6^{5}	6	6

Quarterfinals
(Italy) M Donati	1	6	6
WC	(Italy) F Baldi	6	3	2
(Italy) S Caruso	6	7^{7}
Q	(Argentina) F Argüello	2	6^{4}

Semifinals
(Italy) M Donati	6^{6}	6^{4}
(Italy) S Caruso	7^{8}	7^{7}
