= 2012 Città di Como Challenger – Singles =

Singles
- 2012 Città di Como Challenger

Final
- Champion: (Austria) Andreas Haider-Maurer
- Runner-up: (Portugal) João Sousa
- Score: 6–3, 6–4

Events
Singles	Doubles
← 2011 ·	Città di Como Challenger	· 2013 →

Pablo Carreño Busta was the defending champion but decided not to participate.
Andreas Haider-Maurer won the title by defeating João Sousa 6–3, 6–4 in the final.

== Seeds ==
1. (Portugal) Frederico Gil (first round)
2. (Portugal) João Sousa (final)
3. (Austria) Andreas Haider-Maurer
4. (Italy) Matteo Viola (first round)
5. (Kazakhstan) Andrey Golubev (first round, retired because of a stomachache)
6. (Italy) Alessandro Giannessi (quarterfinals)
7. (Chile) Paul Capdeville (quarterfinals, retired because of a left low back injury)
8. (Slovakia) Pavol Červenák (second round)

== Draw ==
=== Key ===
- Q = Qualifier
- WC = Wild card
- LL = Lucky loser
- Alt = Alternate
- SE = Special exempt
- PR = Protected ranking
- ITF = ITF entry
- JE = Junior exempt
- w/o = Walkover
- r = Retired
- d = Defaulted
- SR = Special ranking

=== Finals ===
Semifinals
(Italy) Gianluca Naso	6^{5}	6	4
3	(Austria) Andreas Haider-Maurer	7^{7}	1	6
Q	(Kazakhstan) Evgeny Korolev	5	4
2	(Portugal) João Sousa	7	6

Final
3	(Austria) Andreas Haider-Maurer	6	6
2	(Portugal) João Sousa	3	4

=== Top half ===
First round
1	(Portugal) F Gil	4	4
(Italy) G Naso	6	6
(Netherlands) T de Bakker	4	4
(Slovakia) A Martin	6	6
(Germany) J Reister	6	7^{7}
Q	(Switzerland) Yann Marti	0	6^{3}
WC	(Italy) Marco Cecchinato	3	3
8	(Slovakia) P Červenák	6	6
3	(Austria) A Haider-Maurer	4	6	6
(Netherlands) B Westerhof	6	4	4
Alt	(Austria) M Linzer	2	5
(Spain) J Martí	6	7
Q	(Germany) A Begemann	6	7^{7}
WC	(Italy) M Crugnola	1	6^{4}
(Hungary) A Balázs	7^{8}	3	3
6	(Italy) A Giannessi	6^{6}	6	6

Second round
(Italy) G Naso	7	6
(Slovakia) A Martin	5	3
(Germany) J Reister	4	7	7^{7}
8	(Slovakia) P Červenák	6	5	6^{4}
3	(Austria) A Haider-Maurer	6	6
(Spain) J Martí	2	2
Q	(Germany) A Begemann	0	4
6	(Italy) A Giannessi	6	6

Quarterfinals
(Italy) G Naso	w/o
(Germany) J Reister
3	(Austria) A Haider-Maurer	6	6
6	(Italy) A Giannessi	3	4

Semifinals
(Italy) G Naso	6^{5}	6	4
3	(Austria) A Haider-Maurer	7^{7}	1	6

=== Bottom half ===
First round
5	(Kazakhstan) A Golubev	7^{7}	2	2^{r}
(Bosnia and Herzegovina) D Džumhur	6^{5}	6	5
Q	(Kazakhstan) E Korolev	6	3	6
Q	(Italy) A Brizzi	1	6	3
(Argentina) F Argüello	6	6
WC	(Italy) Andrea Arnaboldi	2	3
(Italy) S Vagnozzi	7	6
4	(Italy) M Viola	5	1
7	(Chile) P Capdeville	7^{7}	6^{4}	6
(Netherlands) T Schoorel	6^{5}	7^{7}	0
Alt	(France) S Robert	7	6
(Germany) S Greul	5	4
WC	(Chile) N Massú	1	4
Alt	(Switzerland) M Lammer	6	6
(Czech Republic) I Minář	2	2
2	(Portugal) J Sousa	6	6

Second round
(Bosnia and Herzegovina) D Džumhur	3	6^{5}
Q	(Kazakhstan) E Korolev	6	7^{7}
(Argentina) F Argüello	3	6	6
(Italy) S Vagnozzi	6	4	2
7	(Chile) P Capdeville	6	6
Alt	(France) S Robert	0	4
Alt	(Switzerland) M Lammer	1	5
2	(Portugal) J Sousa	6	7

Quarterfinals
Q	(Kazakhstan) E Korolev	6	6
(Argentina) F Argüello	2	3
7	(Chile) P Capdeville	6^{4}	6	0^{r}
2	(Portugal) J Sousa	7^{7}	4	4

Semifinals
Q	(Kazakhstan) E Korolev	5	4
2	(Portugal) J Sousa	7	6
