= 2012 Città di Como Challenger – Doubles =

Doubles
- 2012 Città di Como Challenger

Final
- Champions: (Germany) Philipp Marx (Romania) Florin Mergea
- Runners-up: (Australia) Colin Ebelthite (Czech Republic) Jaroslav Pospíšil
- Score: 6–4, 4–6, [10–4]

Events
Singles	Doubles
← 2011 ·	Città di Como Challenger	· 2013 →

Federico Delbonis and Renzo Olivo were the defending champions but Delbonis decided not to participate.
Olivo played alongside Dane Propoggia.
Philipp Marx and Florin Mergea won the title, defeating Colin Ebelthite and Jaroslav Pospíšil 6–4, 4–6, [10–4] in the final.

== Seeds ==
1. (Germany) Philipp Marx / (Romania) Florin Mergea (champions)
2. (Germany) Andre Begemann / (Slovakia) Igor Zelenay (semifinals)
3. (Australia) Colin Ebelthite / (Czech Republic) Jaroslav Pospíšil (final)
4. (India) Purav Raja / (Canada) Adil Shamasdin (first round)

== Draw ==
=== Key ===
- Q = Qualifier
- WC = Wild card
- LL = Lucky loser
- Alt = Alternate
- SE = Special exempt
- PR = Protected ranking
- ITF = ITF entry
- JE = Junior exempt
- w/o = Walkover
- r = Retired
- d = Defaulted
- SR = Special ranking

=== Draw ===
First round
1	(Germany) P Marx (Romania) F Mergea	4	7^{7}	[10]
(Argentina) R Olivo (Australia) D Propoggia	6	6^{5}	[5]
WC	(Italy) T Fabbiano (Italy) W Trusendi	6	6
(France) O Charroin (France) S Robert	4	4
4	(India) P Raja (Canada) A Shamasdin	6	2	[7]
(Romania) A Dăescu (Australia) A Hubble	4	6	[10]
(Croatia) M Draganja (Croatia) L Zovko	6	6
(Italy) S Ianni (Italy) S Vagnozzi	2	2
(Portugal) F Gil (Portugal) J Sousa	6	6
WC	(United States) Sam Barnett (United States) K Kim	0	1
(Chile) P Capdeville (Italy) A Giannessi	6	2	[2]
3	(Australia) C Ebelthite (Czech Republic) J Pospíšil	2	6	[10]
(Slovakia) P Červenák (Italy) A Motti	3	6	[10]
(Kazakhstan) A Golubev (Kazakhstan) Y Schukin	6	1	[8]
WC	(Italy) A Brizzi (Italy) M Crugnola	0	1
2	(Germany) A Begemann (Slovakia) I Zelenay	6	6

Quarterfinals
1	(Germany) P Marx (Romania) F Mergea	6	4	[10]
WC	(Italy) T Fabbiano (Italy) W Trusendi	3	6	[3]
(Romania) A Dăescu (Australia) A Hubble	4	6	10
(Croatia) M Draganja (Croatia) L Zovko	6	4	4
(Portugal) F Gil (Portugal) J Sousa	3	4
3	(Australia) C Ebelthite (Czech Republic) J Pospíšil	6	6
(Slovakia) P Červenák (Italy) A Motti	5	4
2	(Germany) A Begemann (Slovakia) I Zelenay	7	6

Semifinals
1	(Germany) P Marx (Romania) F Mergea	7^{7}	6
(Romania) A Dăescu (Australia) A Hubble	6^{5}	4
3	(Australia) C Ebelthite (Czech Republic) J Pospíšil	7^{9}	6
2	(Germany) A Begemann (Slovakia) I Zelenay	6^{7}	4

Final
1	(Germany) P Marx (Romania) F Mergea	6	4	[10]
3	(Australia) C Ebelthite (Czech Republic) J Pospíšil	4	6	[4]
