= 2018 Città di Como Challenger =

- Date: 27 August – 2 September
- Edition: 13th
- Surface: Clay
- Location: Como, Italy

Champions

Singles
- (Italy) Salvatore Caruso

Doubles
- (Germany) Andre Begemann / (Germany) Dustin Brown
← 2017 ·	Città di Como Challenger	· 2019 →

The 2018 Città di Como Challenger was a professional tennis tournament played on clay courts. It was the thirteenth edition of the tournament which was part of the 2018 ATP Challenger Tour. It took place in Como, Italy between 27 August – 2 September 2018.

== Singles main-draw entrants ==
=== Seeds ===
Country	Player	Rank^{1}	Seed
SVK	Martin Kližan	72	1
BOL	Hugo Dellien	105	2
POR	Pedro Sousa	115	3
BRA	Thiago Monteiro	119	4
ARG	Juan Ignacio Londero	123	5
FRA	Stéphane Robert	136	6
POR	Gastão Elias	147	7
BRA	Rogério Dutra Silva	151	8

- ^{1} Rankings are as of 20 August 2018.

=== Other entrants ===
The following players received wildcards into the singles main draw:

- (Italy) Filippo Baldi
- (Italy) Alessandro Coppini
- (Italy) Francesco Forti
- (Italy) Jannik Sinner

The following player received entry into the singles main draw as an alternate:

- (Slovakia) Martin Kližan

The following players received entry from the qualifying draw:

- (Argentina) Facundo Argüello
- (Germany) Dustin Brown
- (Argentina) Federico Coria
- (Italy) Gianluca Mager

The following player received entry as a lucky loser:

- (Italy) Roberto Marcora

== Champions ==
=== Singles ===
- (Italy) Salvatore Caruso def. (Chile) Christian Garín 7–5, 6–4.

=== Doubles ===
- (Germany) Andre Begemann / (Germany) Dustin Brown def. (Slovakia) Martin Kližan / (Slovakia) Filip Polášek 3–6, 6–4, [10–5].
