= 2013 Città di Como Challenger – Doubles =

Doubles
- 2013 Città di Como Challenger

Final
- Champions: (Australia) Rameez Junaid (Slovakia) Igor Zelenay
- Runners-up: (Italy) Marco Crugnola (Italy) Stefano Ianni
- Score: 7–5, 7–6^{(7–2)}

Events
Singles	Doubles
← 2012 ·	Città di Como Challenger	· 2014 →

Philipp Marx and Florin Mergea were the defending champions but Mergea decided not to participate. Marx played alongside Dustin Brown.

== Seeds ==
1. (Germany) Dustin Brown / (Germany) Philipp Marx (quarterfinals)
2. (Australia) Rameez Junaid / (Slovakia) Igor Zelenay (champions)
3. (Germany) Frank Moser / (Croatia) Franko Škugor (quarterfinals)
4. (Croatia) Marin Draganja / (Croatia) Mate Pavić (semifinals)

== Draw ==
=== Key ===
- Q = Qualifier
- WC = Wild card
- LL = Lucky loser
- Alt = Alternate
- ITF = ITF entry
- PR = Protected ranking
- SR = Special ranking
- SE = Special exempt
- JE = Junior exempt
- JR = Junior Accelerator Programme entrant
- CO = College Accelerator Programme entrant
- NG = Next Gen Accelerator Program entrant
- w/o = Walkover
- r = Retired
- d = Defaulted

=== Draw ===
First round
1	(Germany) D Brown (Germany) P Marx	6	6
(Russia) T Gabashvili (Serbia) B Pašanski	4	0
Alt	(Italy) M Crugnola (Italy) S Ianni	5	6	[10]
(Italy) A Motti (India) P Raja	7	4	[4]
4	(Croatia) M Draganja (Croatia) M Pavić	6	6
WC	(Italy) Davide Borromini (Italy) Leandro Mosconi	1	0
WC	(Italy) Carlo Alberto Fossati (Italy) Christian Scandroglio	0	0
(Finland) H Kontinen (Sweden) A Siljeström	6	6
WC	(Italy) D Giorgini (Italy) Matteo Volante	6^{4}	3
(Germany) A Satschko (Canada) A Shamasdin	7^{7}	6
(Serbia) I Bozoljac (Serbia) D Lajović	6	3	[8]
3	(Germany) F Moser (Croatia) F Škugor	3	6	[10]
(Argentina) R Olivo (Argentina) M Trungelliti	4	4
(Italy) A Giannessi (Italy) P Starace	6	6
(Chile) J Aguilar (Spain) E López-Pérez	3	2
2	(Australia) R Junaid (Slovakia) I Zelenay	6	6

Quarterfinals
1	(Germany) D Brown (Germany) P Marx	4	3
Alt	(Italy) M Crugnola (Italy) S Ianni	6	6
4	(Croatia) M Draganja (Croatia) M Pavić	7	3	[18]
(Finland) H Kontinen (Sweden) A Siljeström	6^{5}	6	[16]
(Germany) A Satschko (Canada) A Shamasdin	7	6
3	(Germany) F Moser (Croatia) F Škugor	5	4
(Italy) A Giannessi (Italy) P Starace	5	3
2	(Australia) R Junaid (Slovakia) I Zelenay	7	6

Semifinals
Alt	(Italy) M Crugnola (Italy) S Ianni	6	6
4	(Croatia) M Draganja (Croatia) M Pavić	4	4
(Germany) A Satschko (Canada) A Shamasdin	1	3
2	(Australia) R Junaid (Slovakia) I Zelenay	6	6

Final
Alt	(Italy) M Crugnola (Italy) S Ianni	5	6^{2}
2	(Australia) R Junaid (Slovakia) I Zelenay	7	7^{7}
