= 2010 Città di Como Challenger – Doubles =

Doubles
- 2010 Città di Como Challenger

Final
- Champions: (Germany) Frank Moser (Czech Republic) David Škoch
- Runners-up: (Germany) Martin Emmrich (Poland) Mateusz Kowalczyk
- Score: 5–7, 7–6(2), [10–5]

Events
Singles	Doubles
← 2009 ·	Città di Como Challenger	· 2011 →

Marco Crugnola and Alessandro Motti were the defending champions, but they were eliminated by Martin Slanar and Lovro Zovko in the first round.
Frank Moser and David Škoch defeated Martin Emmrich and Mateusz Kowalczyk 5–7, 7–6(2), [10–5] in the final to win the title.

== Seeds ==
1. (South Africa) Jeff Coetzee / (United Kingdom) Jamie Murray (first round)
2. (Germany) Martin Emmrich / (Poland) Mateusz Kowalczyk (final)
3. (Austria) Martin Slanar / (Croatia) Lovro Zovko (quarterfinals, retired)
4. (Germany) Frank Moser / (Czech Republic) David Škoch (champion)

== Draw ==
=== Key ===
- Q = Qualifier
- WC = Wild card
- LL = Lucky loser
- Alt = Alternate
- SE = Special exempt
- PR = Protected ranking
- ITF = ITF entry
- JE = Junior exempt
- w/o = Walkover
- r = Retired
- d = Defaulted
- SR = Special ranking

=== Draw ===
First round
1	(South Africa) J Coetzee (United Kingdom) J Murray	6	1	[8]
ALT	(France) O Charroin (France) A Renard	1	6	[10]
(Spain) I Navarro (Spain) R Ramírez Hidalgo	3	1
(Argentina) J-M Aranguren (Argentina) D Junqueira	6	6
4	(Germany) F Moser (Czech Republic) D Škoch	6^{7}	7	[10]
(Netherlands) R Haase (Netherlands) T Schoorel	7	6^{3}	[5]
(Switzerland) Y Allegro (Netherlands) J Huta Galung	7	6
(United States) A Kumar (Canada) A Shamasdin	5	3
(Slovenia) B Kavčič (Russia) D Sitak	7	5	[10]
WC	(Italy) A Arnaboldi (Italy) G Naso	5	7	[7]
WC	(Italy) M Crugnola (Italy) A Motti	6	3	[4]
3	(Austria) M Slanar (Croatia) L Zovko	3	6	[10]
PR	(Colombia) A González (Argentina) D Hartfield	6	6
WC	(Italy) A Brizzi (Italy) W Trusendi	3	4
(Portugal) R Machado (Portugal) L Tavares	6^{7}	3
2	(Germany) M Emmrich (Poland) M Kowalczyk	7	6

Quarterfinals
ALT	(France) O Charroin (France) A Renard	6	1	[2]
(Argentina) J-M Aranguren (Argentina) D Junqueira	3	6	[10]
4	(Germany) F Moser (Czech Republic) D Škoch	7	6
(Switzerland) Y Allegro (Netherlands) J Huta Galung	6^{8}	4
(Slovenia) B Kavčič (Russia) D Sitak	7
3	(Austria) M Slanar (Croatia) L Zovko	6^{5}	r
PR	(Colombia) A González (Argentina) D Hartfield	2	1
2	(Germany) M Emmrich (Poland) M Kowalczyk	6	6

Semifinals
(Argentina) J-M Aranguren (Argentina) D Junqueira	6	5	[5]
4	(Germany) F Moser (Czech Republic) D Škoch	2	7	[10]
(Slovenia) B Kavčič (Russia) D Sitak	w/o
2	(Germany) M Emmrich (Poland) M Kowalczyk

Finals
4	(Germany) F Moser (Czech Republic) D Škoch	5	7	[10]
2	(Germany) M Emmrich (Poland) M Kowalczyk	7	6^{2}	[5]
