= 2016 Città di Como Challenger – Singles =

Singles
- 2016 Città di Como Challenger

Final
- Champion: (France) Kenny de Schepper
- Runner-up: (Italy) Marco Cecchinato
- Score: 2–6, 7–6^{(7–0)}, 7–5

Events
Singles	Doubles
← 2015 ·	Città di Como Challenger	· 2017 →

Andrey Kuznetsov was the defending champion but chose not to defend his title.

Kenny de Schepper won the title after defeating Marco Cecchinato 2–6, 7–6^{(7–0)}, 7–5 in the final.

== Seeds ==
1. (Austria) Gerald Melzer (quarterfinals)
2. (Spain) Roberto Carballés Baena (first round)
3. (Japan) Taro Daniel (semifinals)
4. (Slovakia) Andrej Martin (first round)
5. (Argentina) Marco Trungelliti (second round)
6. (Argentina) Leonardo Mayer (quarterfinals)
7. (Spain) Albert Montañés (second round)
8. (Italy) Marco Cecchinato (final)

== Draw ==
=== Key ===
- Q = Qualifier
- WC = Wild card
- LL = Lucky loser
- Alt = Alternate
- SE = Special exempt
- PR = Protected ranking
- ITF = ITF entry
- JE = Junior exempt
- w/o = Walkover
- r = Retired
- d = Defaulted
- SR = Special ranking

=== Finals ===
Semifinals
8	(Italy) Marco Cecchinato	6	1	7^{7}
3	(Japan) Taro Daniel	3	6	6^{1}
(France) Kenny de Schepper	6	7
(Romania) Adrian Ungur	4	5

Final
8	(Italy) Marco Cecchinato	6	6^{0}	5
(France) Kenny de Schepper	2	7^{7}	7

=== Top half ===
First round
1	(Austria) G Melzer	6	6
WC	(Italy) L Sonego	3	1
(Italy) A Arnaboldi	6	6
Q	(Argentina) P Cachin	4	4
Q	(Sweden) M Ymer	0	6	6
Q	(Serbia) D Petrović	6	4	4
(Italy) F Volandri	2	7^{7}	3
8	(Italy) M Cecchinato	6	6^{4}	6
3	(Japan) T Daniel	6	6
(Italy) S Napolitano	4	1
Q	(Italy) A Vavassori	3	3
(Egypt) M Safwat	6	6
WC	(Italy) G Mager	3	1
(Germany) N Langer	6	6
(Belarus) U Ignatik	4	2
7	(Spain) A Montañés	6	6

Second round
1	(Austria) G Melzer	3	6	7^{7}
(Italy) A Arnaboldi	6	3	6^{5}
Q	(Sweden) M Ymer	3	6^{1}
8	(Italy) M Cecchinato	6	7^{7}
3	(Japan) T Daniel	7	3	6
(Egypt) M Safwat	5	6	2
(Germany) N Langer	7^{10}	6
7	(Spain) A Montañés	6^{8}	4

Quarterfinals
1	(Austria) G Melzer	6^{4}	4
8	(Italy) M Cecchinato	7^{7}	6
3	(Japan) T Daniel	6	6
(Germany) N Langer	1	4

Semifinals
8	(Italy) M Cecchinato	6	1	7^{7}
3	(Japan) T Daniel	3	6	6^{1}

=== Bottom half ===
First round
6	(Argentina) L Mayer	6	7^{7}
(Portugal) P Sousa	2	6^{2}
Alt	(Germany) M Marterer	6	7
(Sweden) E Ymer	3	5
(France) K de Schepper	6	6
(India) R Ramanathan	2	2
(Russia) A Rublev	2	6	6
4	(Slovakia) A Martin	6	3	3
5	(Argentina) M Trungelliti	6	4	6
WC	(Italy) G Quinzi	4	6	4
LL	(Argentina) A Collarini	7	6
(Austria) D Novak	5	1
WC	(Italy) A Pellegrino	4	3
(Serbia) F Krajinović	6	6
(Romania) A Ungur	7	7^{7}
2	(Spain) R Carballés Baena	5	6^{4}

Second round
6	(Argentina) L Mayer	6^{4}	6	6
Alt	(Germany) M Marterer	7^{7}	2	1
(France) K de Schepper	7	4	7^{7}
(Russia) A Rublev	5	6	6^{5}
5	(Argentina) M Trungelliti	2	2
LL	(Argentina) A Collarini	6	6
(Serbia) F Krajinović
(Romania) A Ungur	w/o

Quarterfinals
6	(Argentina) L Mayer	6	5	4
(France) K de Schepper	4	7	6
LL	(Argentina) A Collarini	4	4
(Romania) A Ungur	6	6

Semifinals
(France) K de Schepper	6	7
(Romania) A Ungur	4	5
