= 2018 Città di Como Challenger – Doubles =

Doubles
- 2018 Città di Como Challenger

Final
- Champions: (Germany) Andre Begemann (Germany) Dustin Brown
- Runners-up: (Slovakia) Martin Kližan (Slovakia) Filip Polášek
- Score: 3–6, 6–4, [10–5]

Events
| Singles | Doubles |
| ← 2017 · | Città di Como Challenger | · 2019 → |

Sander Arends and Antonio Šančić were the defending champions but chose not to defend their title.

Andre Begemann and Dustin Brown won the title after defeating Martin Kližan and Filip Polášek 3–6, 6–4, [10–5] in the final.

== Seeds ==
1. (Belgium) Sander Gillé / (Belgium) Joran Vliegen (quarterfinals)
2. (Bosnia and Herzegovina) Tomislav Brkić / (Croatia) Ante Pavić (semifinals)
3. (Germany) Andre Begemann / (Germany) Dustin Brown (champions)
4. (Italy) Julian Ocleppo / (Italy) Andrea Vavassori (first round)

== Draw ==
=== Key ===
- Q = Qualifier
- WC = Wild card
- LL = Lucky loser
- Alt = Alternate
- SE = Special exempt
- PR = Protected ranking
- ITF = ITF entry
- JE = Junior exempt
- w/o = Walkover
- r = Retired
- d = Defaulted
- SR = Special ranking

First round
1 | (Belgium) S Gillé (Belgium) J Vliegen | 6^{4} | 7^{7} | [10]
(Australia) R Junaid (Netherlands) D Pel | 7^{7} | 6^{5} | [8]
(Chile) C Garín (Argentina) JI Londero | 2 | 3
WC | (Italy) F Baldi (Italy) S Caruso | 6 | 6
3 | (Germany) A Begemann (Germany) D Brown | 6 | 7
WC | (Italy) F Forti (Italy) Federico Iannaccone | 3 | 5
(Uruguay) M Cuevas (Bolivia) H Dellien | 6 | 6
(Brazil) F Romboli (Italy) W Trusendi | 4 | 4
(Brazil) R Dutra Silva (Brazil) T Monteiro | 7^{7} | 6
(Slovakia) A Martin (Austria) T-S Weissborn | 6^{2} | 1
WC | (Slovakia) M Kližan (Slovakia) F Polášek | 6^{6} | 6 | [10]
4 | (Italy) J Ocleppo (Italy) A Vavassori | 7^{8} | 4 | [6]
(France) G Blancaneaux (France) S Robert | 7 | 6
(Italy) A Motti (Portugal) P Sousa | 5 | 1
(Argentina) G Durán (Italy) A Giannessi | 3 | 5
2 | (Bosnia and Herzegovina) T Brkić (Croatia) A Pavić | 6 | 7

Quarterfinals
1 | (Belgium) S Gillé (Belgium) J Vliegen | 6 | 4 | [9]
WC | (Italy) F Baldi (Italy) S Caruso | 3 | 6 | [11]
3 | (Germany) A Begemann (Germany) D Brown | w/o
(Uruguay) M Cuevas (Bolivia) H Dellien
(Brazil) R Dutra Silva (Brazil) T Monteiro | 7^{7} | 6^{2} | [8]
WC | (Slovakia) M Kližan (Slovakia) F Polášek | 6^{3} | 7^{7} | [10]
(France) G Blancaneaux (France) S Robert | 5 | 2
2 | (Bosnia and Herzegovina) T Brkić (Croatia) A Pavić | 7 | 6

Semifinals
WC | (Italy) F Baldi (Italy) S Caruso | 4 | 4
3 | (Germany) A Begemann (Germany) D Brown | 6 | 6
WC | (Slovakia) M Kližan (Slovakia) F Polášek | 7^{7} | 6
2 | (Bosnia and Herzegovina) T Brkić (Croatia) A Pavić | 6^{4} | 3

Final
3 | (Germany) A Begemann (Germany) D Brown | 3 | 6 | [10]
WC | (Slovakia) M Kližan (Slovakia) F Polášek | 6 | 4 | [5]
