= 2011 Città di Como Challenger =

- Date: 29 August – 4 September
- Edition: 6th
- Location: Como, Italy

Champions

Singles
- (Spain) Pablo Carreño Busta

Doubles
- (Argentina) Federico Delbonis / (Argentina) Renzo Olivo
← 2010 ·	Città di Como Challenger	· 2012 →

The 2011 Città di Como Challenger was a professional tennis tournament played on clay courts. It was the sixth edition of the tournament which was part of the 2011 ATP Challenger Tour. It took place in Como, Italy between 29 August and 4 September 2011.

== ATP entrants ==
=== Seeds ===
Country	Player	Rank^{1}	Seed
FRA	Stéphane Robert	108	1
FRA	Benoît Paire	118	2
FRA	Florent Serra	133	3
GER	Andreas Beck	137	4
ITA	Paolo Lorenzi	140	5
GER	Simon Greul	147	6
GER	Denis Gremelmayr	164	7
ESP	Pablo Carreño Busta	168	8

- ^{1} Rankings are as of August 22, 2011.

=== Other entrants ===
The following players received wildcards into the singles main draw:

- (Argentina) Federico Delbonis
- (Italy) Daniele Giorgini
- (Italy) Matteo Trevisan

The following players received entry as an alternate into the singles main draw:

- (Argentina) Martín Alund
- (Spain) Iñigo Cervantes-Huegun
- (France) Axel Michon
- (Italy) Gianluca Naso
- (Austria) Philipp Oswald

The following players received entry as a special exemption into the singles main draw:

- (Germany) Peter Gojowczyk

The following players received entry from the qualifying draw:

- (Monaco) Benjamin Balleret
- (Italy) Antonio Comporto
- (Belgium) Niels Desein
- (Argentina) Guillermo Durán
- (Serbia) Boris Pašanski
- (Portugal) Pedro Sousa
- (Germany) Simon Stadler

== Champions ==
=== Singles ===
(Spain) Pablo Carreño Busta def. (Germany) Andreas Beck, 6–4, 7–6^{(7–4)}

=== Doubles ===
(Argentina) Federico Delbonis / (Argentina) Renzo Olivo def. (Argentina) Martín Alund / (Argentina) Facundo Argüello, 6–1, 6–4
