= 2011 Città di Como Challenger – Doubles =

Doubles
- 2011 Città di Como Challenger

Final
- Champions: (Argentina) Federico Delbonis (Argentina) Renzo Olivo
- Runners-up: (Argentina) Martín Alund (Argentina) Facundo Argüello
- Score: 6–1, 6–4

Events
Singles	Doubles
← 2010 ·	Città di Como Challenger	· 2012 →

Frank Moser and David Škoch were the defending champions but decided not to participate.
Federico Delbonis and Renzo Olivo won the final against Martín Alund and Facundo Argüello 6–1, 6–4.

== Seeds ==
1. (Australia) Jordan Kerr / (United Kingdom) Ken Skupski (semifinals)
2. (Italy) Alessandro Motti / (Italy) Simone Vagnozzi (first round)
3. (Australia) Colin Ebelthite / (Australia) Adam Feeney (quarterfinals)
4. (France) Olivier Charroin / (India) Purav Raja (semifinals)

== Draw ==
=== Key ===
- Q = Qualifier
- WC = Wild card
- LL = Lucky loser
- Alt = Alternate
- SE = Special exempt
- PR = Protected ranking
- ITF = ITF entry
- JE = Junior exempt
- w/o = Walkover
- r = Retired
- d = Defaulted
- SR = Special ranking

=== Draw ===
First round
1	(Australia) J Kerr (United Kingdom) K Skupski	6	6
(Italy) D Giorgini (Italy) M Trevisan	2	0
(Austria) P Oswald (Germany) S Stadler	6	7^{7}
(Monaco) B Balleret (France) B Paire	4	6^{5}
3	(Australia) C Ebelthite (Australia) A Feeney	7^{7}	7
(Switzerland) Y Allegro (Germany) A Beck	6^{2}	5
(Italy) M Crugnola (Austria) N Moser	3	4
(Argentina) M Alund (Argentina) F Argüello	6	6
(Serbia) B Pašanski (France) L Recouderc	4	0
(Italy) Andrea Arnaboldi (Italy) S Ianni	6	6
(Belgium) N Desein (France) S Robert	3	2
4	(France) O Charroin (India) P Raja	6	6
(Spain) I Cervantes-Huegun (Slovakia) P Červenák	4	4
(Germany) D Gremelmayr (Germany) S Greul	6	6
(Argentina) F Delbonis (Argentina) R Olivo	7	5	[10]
2	(Italy) A Motti (Italy) S Vagnozzi	5	7	[8]

Quarterfinals
1	(Australia) J Kerr (United Kingdom) K Skupski	6	6
(Austria) P Oswald (Germany) S Stadler	4	4
3	(Australia) C Ebelthite (Australia) A Feeney	6^{0}	6	[5]
(Argentina) M Alund (Argentina) F Argüello	7^{7}	4	[10]
(Italy) Andrea Arnaboldi (Italy) S Ianni	3	7^{8}	[6]
4	(France) O Charroin (India) P Raja	6	6^{6}	[10]
(Germany) D Gremelmayr (Germany) S Greul
(Argentina) F Delbonis (Argentina) R Olivo	w/o

Semifinals
1	(Australia) J Kerr (United Kingdom) K Skupski	4	7^{7}	[7]
(Argentina) M Alund (Argentina) F Argüello	6	6^{5}	[10]
4	(France) O Charroin (India) P Raja	2	2
(Argentina) F Delbonis (Argentina) R Olivo	6	6

Final
(Argentina) M Alund (Argentina) F Argüello	1	4
(Argentina) F Delbonis (Argentina) R Olivo	6	6
