= 2013 Città di Como Challenger – Singles =

Singles
- 2013 Città di Como Challenger

Final
- Champion: (Spain) Pablo Carreño Busta
- Runner-up: (Austria) Dominic Thiem
- Score: 6–2, 5–7, 6–0

Events
Singles	Doubles
← 2012 ·	Città di Como Challenger	· 2014 →

Andreas Haider-Maurer was the defending champion but had to compete at the 2013 US Open instead.

== Seeds ==
1. (Spain) Pablo Carreño Busta (champion)
2. (Czech Republic) Jan Hájek (first round)
3. (Russia) Teymuraz Gabashvili (quarterfinals)
4. (Serbia) Dušan Lajović (second round)
5. (Belgium) Steve Darcis (second round)
6. (Spain) Pere Riba (withdrew, Illness)
7. (Germany) Simon Greul (quarterfinals)
8. (Germany) Bastian Knittel (first round, Retired)
9. (Germany) Dustin Brown (second round)

== Draw ==
=== Key ===
- Q = Qualifier
- WC = Wild card
- LL = Lucky loser
- Alt = Alternate
- SE = Special exempt
- PR = Protected ranking
- ITF = ITF entry
- JE = Junior exempt
- w/o = Walkover
- r = Retired
- d = Defaulted
- SR = Special ranking

=== Finals ===
Semifinals
1	(Spain) Pablo Carreño Busta	6	6
WC	(Italy) Marco Crugnola	3	1
Q	(Italy) Lorenzo Giustino	5	2
(Austria) Dominic Thiem	7	6

Final
1	(Spain) Pablo Carreño Busta	6	5	6
(Austria) Dominic Thiem	2	7	0

=== Top half ===
First round
1	(Spain) P Carreño Busta	4
(Netherlands) T Schoorel	1^{r}
(Germany) C-M Stebe	6	6
(France) M Teixeira	0	2
(Belgium) N Desein	6	6^{5}	5
WC	(Italy) G Naso	1	7^{7}	7
(Italy) S Vagnozzi	5	6	1
5	(Belgium) S Darcis	7	4	6
3	(Russia) T Gabashvili	7	7
WC	(Italy) A Arnaboldi	5	5
(Italy) P Starace	6	6
(Chile) J Aguilar	2	3
(Argentina) M Trungelliti	5	2
Alt	(Spain) E López Pérez	7	6
WC	(Italy) M Crugnola	2	4
8	(Germany) B Knittel	6	4^{r}

Second round
1	(Spain) P Carreño Busta	6	7
(Germany) C-M Stebe	2	5
WC	(Italy) G Naso	6	6
5	(Belgium) S Darcis	3	4
3	(Russia) T Gabashvili	6	1	6
(Italy) P Starace	1	6	4
Alt	(Spain) E López Pérez	2	4
WC	(Italy) M Crugnola	6	6

Quarterfinals
1	(Spain) P Carreño Busta	7	6^{4}	6
WC	(Italy) G Naso	5	7^{7}	4
3	(Russia) T Gabashvili	6	5	4
WC	(Italy) M Crugnola	0	7	6

Semifinals
1	(Spain) P Carreño Busta	6	6
WC	(Italy) M Crugnola	3	1

=== Bottom half ===
First round
7	(Germany) S Greul	6	6
(Argentina) R Olivo	2	0
(Slovakia) N Gombos	7	5	3
Q	(Germany) Moritz Baumann	5	7	6
(Serbia) B Pašanski	2	6^{4}
Q	(Italy) L Giustino	6	7^{7}
LL	(Croatia) M Delić	7^{8}	4	6^{6}
4	(Serbia) D Lajović	6^{6}	6	7^{8}
9	(Germany) D Brown	6	6
(Spain) R Carballes Baena	4	4
Alt	(Japan) T Daniel	1	6^{1}
Q	(Serbia) I Bozoljac	6	7^{7}
Q	(Croatia) M Pavić	4	2
WC	(Italy) A Giannessi	6	6
(Austria) D Thiem	6^{4}	7^{7}	7
2	(Czech Republic) J Hájek	7^{7}	6^{3}	5

Second round
7	(Germany) S Greul	6	3	7^{7}
Q	(Germany) M Baumann	2	6	6^{4}
Q	(Italy) L Giustino	4	7^{7}	7
4	(Serbia) D Lajović	6	6^{5}	5
9	(Germany) D Brown	5	6	4
Q	(Serbia) I Bozoljac	7	1	6
WC	(Italy) A Giannessi	4	4
(Austria) D Thiem	6	6

Quarterfinals
7	(Germany) S Greul	3	6^{5}
Q	(Italy) L Giustino	6	7^{7}
Q	(Serbia) I Bozoljac	6	3	3
(Austria) D Thiem	4	6	6

Semifinals
Q	(Italy) L Giustino	5	2
(Austria) D Thiem	7	6
