= 2016 Città di Como Challenger – Doubles =

Doubles
- 2016 Città di Como Challenger

Final
- Champions: (Czech Republic) Roman Jebavý (Slovakia) Andrej Martin
- Runners-up: (Germany) Nils Langer (Austria) Gerald Melzer
- Score: 3–6, 6–1, [10–5]

Events
Singles	Doubles
← 2015 ·	Città di Como Challenger	· 2017 →

Gero Kretschmer and Alexander Satschko were the defending champions but chose not to defend their title.

Roman Jebavý and Andrej Martin won the title after defeating Nils Langer and Gerald Melzer 3–6, 6–1, [10–5] in the final.

== Seeds ==
1. (United States) James Cerretani / (Austria) Philipp Oswald (semifinals)
2. (Belarus) Aliaksandr Bury / (Belarus) Andrei Vasilevski (quarterfinals)
3. (Italy) Alessandro Motti / (Chinese Taipei) Peng Hsien-yin (quarterfinals)
4. (Czech Republic) Roman Jebavý / (Slovakia) Andrej Martin (champions)

== Draw ==
=== Key ===
- Q = Qualifier
- WC = Wild card
- LL = Lucky loser
- Alt = Alternate
- SE = Special exempt
- PR = Protected ranking
- ITF = ITF entry
- JE = Junior exempt
- w/o = Walkover
- r = Retired
- d = Defaulted
- SR = Special ranking

First round
1	(United States) J Cerretani (Austria) P Oswald	6	6^{8}	[10]
(Uruguay) A Behar (Argentina) M Trungelliti	0	7^{10}	[8]
(Italy) A Arnaboldi (Croatia) D Marcan	7^{7}	7^{7}
(Sweden) I Arvidsson (Italy) M Cecchinato	6^{3}	6^{5}
4	(Czech Republic) R Jebavý (Slovakia) A Martin	6	6
(Germany) K Krawietz (Austria) D Novak	4	2
WC	(Italy) Fabio Grassi (Italy) Massimo Scotti	0	0
(Russia) A Rublev (Sweden) E Ymer	6	6
(Argentina) P Cachin (Spain) R Carballés Baena	4	6^{3}
(Germany) N Langer (Austria) G Melzer	6	7^{7}
(Belarus) U Ignatik (Chinese Taipei) T-h Yang	4	7	[8]
3	(Italy) A Motti (Chinese Taipei) H-y Peng	6	5	[10]
WC	(Italy) S Napolitano (Italy) A Pellegrino	6	6
WC	(Italy) L Sonego (Italy) A Vavassori	2	4
(Italy) R Ghedin (India) R Ramanathan	4	6^{4}
2	(Belarus) A Bury (Belarus) A Vasilevski	6	7^{7}

Quarterfinals
1	(United States) J Cerretani (Austria) P Oswald	7	6
(Italy) A Arnaboldi (Croatia) D Marcan	5	4
4	(Czech Republic) R Jebavý (Slovakia) A Martin	w/o
(Russia) A Rublev (Sweden) E Ymer
(Germany) N Langer (Austria) G Melzer	6	6
3	(Italy) A Motti (Chinese Taipei) H-y Peng	3	4
WC	(Italy) S Napolitano (Italy) A Pellegrino	6	6^{5}	[10]
2	(Belarus) A Bury (Belarus) A Vasilevski	4	7^{7}	[7]

Semifinals
1	(United States) J Cerretani (Austria) P Oswald	2	5
4	(Czech Republic) R Jebavý (Slovakia) A Martin	6	7
(Germany) N Langer (Austria) G Melzer	6	6
WC	(Italy) S Napolitano (Italy) A Pellegrino	3	2

Final
4	(Czech Republic) R Jebavý (Slovakia) A Martin	3	6	[10]
(Germany) N Langer (Austria) G Melzer	6	1	[5]
