= 2021 Città di Como Challenger – Doubles =

Doubles
- 2021 Città di Como Challenger

Final
- Champions: (Brazil) Rafael Matos (Brazil) Felipe Meligeni Alves
- Runners-up: (Venezuela) Luis David Martínez (Italy) Andrea Vavassori
- Score: 6–7^{(2–7)}, 6–4, [10–6]

Events
Singles	Doubles
← 2019 ·	Città di Como Challenger	· 2022 →

Andre Begemann and Florin Mergea were the defending champions but chose not to defend their title.

Rafael Matos and Felipe Meligeni Alves won the title after defeating Luis David Martínez and Andrea Vavassori 6–7^{(2–7)}, 6–4, [10–6] in the final.

== Seeds ==
1. (Brazil) Rafael Matos / (Brazil) Felipe Meligeni Alves (champions)
2. (Venezuela) Luis David Martínez / (Italy) Andrea Vavassori (final)
3. (Croatia) Ivan Sabanov / (Croatia) Matej Sabanov (first round)
4. (Germany) Andre Begemann / (France) Albano Olivetti (first round)

== Draw ==
=== Key ===
- Q = Qualifier
- WC = Wild card
- LL = Lucky loser
- Alt = Alternate
- SE = Special exempt
- PR = Protected ranking
- ITF = ITF entry
- JE = Junior exempt
- w/o = Walkover
- r = Retired
- d = Defaulted
- SR = Special ranking

First round
1	(Brazil) R Matos (Brazil) F Meligeni Alves	6	6
WC	(Italy) Federico Iannaccone (Italy) A Motti	3	1
Alt	(Argentina) M Kestelboim (Argentina) C Ugo Carabelli	6	7^{7}
(France) S Doumbia (France) F Reboul	4	6^{2}
3	(Croatia) I Sabanov (Croatia) M Sabanov	7	2	[7]
(Italy) M Bortolotti (Uruguay) M Cuevas	5	6	[10]
(Italy) F Baldi (Italy) J Ocleppo	2	3
(Austria) A Erler (Austria) L Miedler	6	6
(Germany) D Brown (Slovakia) A Martin	6	6
WC	(Italy) Niccolò Ciavarella (Italy) Daniele Minighini	0	1
(Switzerland) M-A Hüsler (Switzerland) L Margaroli	3	6	[10]
4	(Germany) A Begemann (France) A Olivetti	6	1	[5]
(France) G Blancaneaux (France) T Lamasine	1	3
WC	(Italy) F Forti (Italy) G Zeppieri	6	6
(Brazil) J Menezes (Brazil) M Pucinelli de Almeida
2	(Venezuela) LD Martínez (Italy) A Vavassori	w/o

Quarterfinals
1	(Brazil) R Matos (Brazil) F Meligeni Alves	w/o
Alt	(Argentina) M Kestelboim (Argentina) C Ugo Carabelli
(Italy) M Bortolotti (Uruguay) M Cuevas	6	4	[4]
(Austria) A Erler (Austria) L Miedler	4	6	[10]
(Germany) D Brown (Slovakia) A Martin	4	6	[10]
(Switzerland) M-A Hüsler (Switzerland) L Margaroli	6	3	[7]
WC	(Italy) F Forti (Italy) G Zeppieri	4	4
2	(Venezuela) LD Martínez (Italy) A Vavassori	6	6

Semifinals
1	(Brazil) R Matos (Brazil) F Meligeni Alves	7	6
(Austria) A Erler (Austria) L Miedler	5	2
(Germany) D Brown (Slovakia) A Martin	3	4
2	(Venezuela) LD Martínez (Italy) A Vavassori	6	6

Final
1	(Brazil) R Matos (Brazil) F Meligeni Alves	6^{2}	6	[10]
2	(Venezuela) LD Martínez (Italy) A Vavassori	7^{7}	4	[6]
