= 2015 Città di Como Challenger – Doubles =

Doubles
- 2015 Città di Como Challenger

Final
- Champions: (Germany) Gero Kretschmer (Germany) Alexander Satschko
- Runners-up: (France) Kenny de Schepper (France) Maxime Teixeira
- Score: 7–6^{(7–3)}, 6–4

Events
Singles	Doubles
← 2014 ·	Città di Como Challenger	· 2016 →

Guido Andreozzi and Facundo Argüello are the defending champions, but chose not to participate. Gero Kretschmer and Alexander Satschko won the title, defeating Kenny de Schepper and Maxime Teixeira 7–6^{(7–3)}, 6–4.

== Seeds ==
1. (Germany) Gero Kretschmer / (Germany) Alexander Satschko (champions)
2. (Poland) Mateusz Kowalczyk / (Slovakia) Andrej Martin (first round)
3. (Spain) Enrique López-Pérez / (Chile) Hans Podlipnik-Castillo (quarterfinals)
4. (Italy) Alessandro Motti / (Croatia) Franko Škugor (semifinals)

== Draw ==
=== Key ===
- Q = Qualifier
- WC = Wild card
- LL = Lucky loser
- Alt = Alternate
- SE = Special exempt
- PR = Protected ranking
- ITF = ITF entry
- JE = Junior exempt
- w/o = Walkover
- r = Retired
- d = Defaulted
- SR = Special ranking

First round
1	(Germany) G Kretschmer (Germany) A Satschko	6	6
(Italy) S Caruso (Italy) F Gaio	4	1
(Portugal) G Elias (Brazil) F Romboli	2	3
(Argentina) P Cachin (Spain) R Carballés Baena	6	6
3	(Spain) E López-Pérez (Chile) H Podlipnik-Castillo	6	6
(Italy) R Bonadio (Italy) Erik Crepaldi	2	2
WC	(Italy) Edoardo Eremin (Italy) G Mager	7^{7}	3	[8]
(Croatia) I Sabanov (Croatia) M Sabanov	6^{4}	6	[10]
(United States) J Cerretani (Uzbekistan) F Dustov	3	6	[10]
WC	(Italy) F Baldi (Italy) Pietro Licciardi	6	3	[5]
(Italy) A Arnaboldi (Italy) G Naso	7	5	[5]
4	(Italy) A Motti (Croatia) F Škugor	5	7	[10]
WC	(Italy) A Virgili (Italy) Matteo Volante	6	6
(Brazil) Tiago Lopes (Chile) JC Sáez	4	2
(France) K de Schepper (France) M Teixeira	6	6
2	(Poland) M Kowalczyk (Slovakia) A Martin	3	4

Quarterfinals
1	(Germany) G Kretschmer (Germany) A Satschko	6	6
(Argentina) P Cachin (Spain) R Carballés Baena	3	2
3	(Spain) E López-Pérez (Chile) H Podlipnik-Castillo	2	3
(Croatia) I Sabanov (Croatia) M Sabanov	6	6
(United States) J Cerretani (Uzbekistan) F Dustov	5	3
4	(Italy) A Motti (Croatia) F Škugor	7	6
WC	(Italy) A Virgili (Italy) M Volante	4	6^{6}
(France) K de Schepper (France) M Teixeira	6	7^{8}

Semifinals
1	(Germany) G Kretschmer (Germany) A Satschko	6	6
(Croatia) I Sabanov (Croatia) M Sabanov	1	3
4	(Italy) A Motti (Croatia) F Škugor	5	4
(France) K de Schepper (France) M Teixeira	7	6

Final
1	(Germany) G Kretschmer (Germany) A Satschko	7^{7}	6
(France) K de Schepper (France) M Teixeira	6^{3}	4
