= 2021 Città di Como Challenger – Singles =

Singles
- 2021 Città di Como Challenger

Final
- Champion: (Argentina) Juan Manuel Cerúndolo
- Runner-up: (Italy) Gian Marco Moroni
- Score: 7–5, 7–6^{(9–7)}

Events
Singles	Doubles
← 2019 ·	Città di Como Challenger	· 2022 →

Facundo Mena was the defending champion but chose not to defend his title.

Juan Manuel Cerúndolo won the title after defeating Gian Marco Moroni 7–5, 7–6^{(9–7)} in the final.

== Seeds ==
1. (Germany) Daniel Altmaier (semifinals, retired)
2. (Slovakia) Jozef Kovalík (quarterfinals)
3. (Slovakia) Andrej Martin (second round)
4. (Argentina) Juan Manuel Cerúndolo (champion)
5. (Italy) Federico Gaio (second round)
6. (India) Sumit Nagal (first round)
7. (Switzerland) Marc-Andrea Hüsler (first round)
8. (Italy) Alessandro Giannessi (withdrew)

== Draw ==
=== Key ===
- Q = Qualifier
- WC = Wild card
- LL = Lucky loser
- Alt = Alternate
- SE = Special exempt
- PR = Protected ranking
- ITF = ITF entry
- JE = Junior exempt
- w/o = Walkover
- r = Retired
- d = Defaulted
- SR = Special ranking

=== Finals ===
Semifinals
1	(Germany) Daniel Altmaier	4	0^{r}
4	(Argentina) Juan Manuel Cerúndolo	6	3
(Italy) Gian Marco Moroni	6	3	4
Q	(Italy) Andrea Vavassori	3	6	0^{r}

Final
4	(Argentina) Juan Manuel Cerúndolo	7	7^{9}
(Italy) Gian Marco Moroni	5	6^{7}

=== Top half ===
First round
1	(Germany) D Altmaier	6	6
(Portugal) J Domingues	2	0
(Brazil) J Menezes	4
Alt	(France) E Furness	1^{r}
WC	(Italy) Federico Iannaccone	5	6	6
SE	(Argentina) C Ugo Carabelli	7	3	4
(Italy) R Bonadio	3	6	6
Q	(Austria) A Erler	6	3	3
4	(Argentina) JM Cerúndolo	6	7^{7}
(France) T Lamasine	4	6^{2}
Q	(Austria) L Miedler	6	2	4
Alt	(Italy) G Zeppieri	4	6	6
PR	(Belgium) J Cagnina	1	3^{r}
WC	(Italy) F Cobolli	6	3
SE	(Croatia) N Serdarušić	6	6
7	(Switzerland) M-A Hüsler	4	3

Second round
1	(Germany) D Altmaier	6	7
(Brazil) J Menezes	0	5
WC	(Italy) F Iannaccone	2	1
(Italy) R Bonadio	6	6
4	(Argentina) JM Cerúndolo	5
Alt	(Italy) G Zeppieri	0^{r}
WC	(Italy) F Cobolli	4	0
SE	(Croatia) N Serdarušić	6	6

Quarterfinals
1	(Germany) D Altmaier	7^{7}	6
(Italy) R Bonadio	6^{3}	3
4	(Argentina) JM Cerúndolo	7	6
SE	(Croatia) N Serdarušić	5	2

Semifinals
1	(Germany) D Altmaier	4	0^{r}
4	(Argentina) JM Cerúndolo	6	3

=== Bottom half ===
First round
5	(Italy) F Gaio	6	3	6
Q	(Cyprus) P Chrysochos	1	6	3
LL	(Russia) A Vatutin	0^{r}
(Italy) GM Moroni	3
PR	(Italy) A Arnaboldi	7^{7}	6
(Russia) T Gabashvili	6^{5}	2
WC	(Italy) F Forti	7	2	1
3	(Slovakia) A Martin	5	6	6
6	(India) S Nagal	4	6^{4}
(Russia) A Kuznetsov	6	7^{7}
(United Kingdom) J Draper	4	6	3
Q	(Italy) A Vavassori	6	2	6
(Portugal) N Borges	3	1
LL	(Italy) F Agamenone	6	6
PR	(Germany) J Lenz	5	2
2	(Slovakia) J Kovalík	7	6

Second round
5	(Italy) F Gaio	5	1
(Italy) GM Moroni	7	6
PR	(Italy) A Arnaboldi	4	6	6
3	(Slovakia) A Martin	6	4	3
(Russia) A Kuznetsov	6	3	4
Q	(Italy) A Vavassori	2	6	6
LL	(Italy) F Agamenone	2	6^{1}
2	(Slovakia) J Kovalík	6	7^{7}

Quarterfinals
(Italy) GM Moroni	6	4	6
PR	(Italy) A Arnaboldi	3	6	2
Q	(Italy) A Vavassori	6	6
2	(Slovakia) J Kovalík	3	4

Semifinals
(Italy) GM Moroni	6	3	4
Q	(Italy) A Vavassori	3	6	0^{r}
