= 2010 Città di Como Challenger – Singles =

Singles
- 2010 Città di Como Challenger

Final
- Champion: (Netherlands) Robin Haase
- Runner-up: (Czech Republic) Ivo Minář
- Score: 6–4, 6–3

Events
Singles	Doubles
← 2009 ·	Città di Como Challenger	· 2011 →

Alexandr Dolgopolov was the defending champion, but chose not to compete this year.
Robin Haase won the final against Ivo Minář 6–4, 6–3.

== Seeds ==
1. (Netherlands) Robin Haase (champion)
2. (Italy) Filippo Volandri (semifinals)
3. (Italy) Paolo Lorenzi (first round)
4. (Germany) Julian Reister (semifinals, retired)
5. (Belgium) Steve Darcis (quarterfinals, withdrew due to a neck injury)
6. (Spain) Albert Ramos Viñolas (first round)
7. (Romania) Adrian Ungur (second round)
8. (Portugal) Rui Machado (quarterfinals)

== Draw ==
=== Key ===
- Q = Qualifier
- WC = Wild card
- LL = Lucky loser
- Alt = Alternate
- SE = Special exempt
- PR = Protected ranking
- ITF = ITF entry
- JE = Junior exempt
- w/o = Walkover
- r = Retired
- d = Defaulted
- SR = Special ranking

=== Finals ===
Semifinals
1	(Netherlands) Robin Haase	6	2
4	(Germany) Julian Reister	1	0^{r}
(Czech Republic) Ivo Minář	6	6
2/WC	(Italy) Filippo Volandri	1	4

Final
1	(Netherlands) Robin Haase	6	6
(Czech Republic) Ivo Minář	4	3

=== Top half ===
First round
1	(Netherlands) R Haase	6	6
(Netherlands) J Huta Galung	2	3
Q	(Italy) W Trusendi	6	6
(Austria) M Fischer	4	1
(Belgium) Y Mertens	5	1
ALT	(Argentina) J-M Aranguren	7	6
(Netherlands) T Schoorel	4	2
8	(Portugal) R Machado	6	6
4	(Germany) J Reister	6	6
SE	(Belgium) D Goffin	4	2
(Austria) D Köllerer	6	6
Q	(Germany) C-M Stebe	4	1
WC	(Austria) T Muster	3	4
Q	(Italy) G Naso	6	6
(Slovenia) B Kavčič	1	6	6
6	(Spain) A Ramos Viñolas	6	2	3

Second round
1	(Netherlands) R Haase	6	6
Q	(Italy) W Trusendi	4	3
ALT	(Argentina) J-M Aranguren	4	3
8	(Portugal) R Machado	6	6
4	(Germany) J Reister	6	6
(Austria) D Köllerer	0	3
Q	(Italy) G Naso	7	5	6
(Slovenia) B Kavčič	6	7	4

Quarterfinals
1	(Netherlands) R Haase	6	7
8	(Portugal) R Machado	4	5
4	(Germany) J Reister	7	6
Q	(Italy) G Naso	6^{8}	2

Semifinals
1	(Netherlands) R Haase	6	2
4	(Germany) J Reister	1	0^{r}

=== Bottom half ===
First round
7	(Romania) A Ungur	6	6
ALT	(Italy) D Giorgini	2	2
(Czech Republic) I Minář	6	6
ALT	(Italy) A Arnaboldi	4	4
(Spain) I Navarro	7	6
(Morocco) R El Amrani	5	2
(France) L Recouderc	6	0	6
3/WC	(Italy) P Lorenzi	2	6	4
5	(Belgium) S Darcis	6	6
(Romania) V Crivoi	1	3
Q	(Austria) J Ager	7	7
(Argentina) D Junqueira	6^{5}	6^{5}
(Portugal) L Tavares	4	4
WC	(Italy) M Trevisan	6	6
SE	(Italy) A Brizzi	2	3
2/WC	(Italy) F Volandri	6	6

Second round
7	(Romania) A Ungur	4	6^{2}
(Czech Republic) I Minář	6	7
(Spain) I Navarro	2	0
(France) L Recouderc	6	6
5	(Belgium) S Darcis	6	1	7
Q	(Austria) J Ager	4	6	5
WC	(Italy) M Trevisan	4	6^{5}
2/WC	(Italy) F Volandri	6	7

Quarterfinals
(Czech Republic) I Minář	7	6^{3}	6
(France) L Recouderc	6^{3}	7	2
5	(Belgium) S Darcis
2/WC	(Italy) F Volandri	w/o

Semifinals
(Czech Republic) I Minář	6	6
2/WC	(Italy) F Volandri	1	4
