= 2013 Città di Como Challenger =

- Date: 26 August – 1 September
- Edition: 8th
- Surface: Clay
- Location: Como, Italy

Champions

Singles
- (Spain) Pablo Carreño Busta

Doubles
- (Australia) Rameez Junaid / (Slovakia) Igor Zelenay
← 2012 ·	Città di Como Challenger	· 2014 →

The 2013 Città di Como Challenger was a professional tennis tournament played on clay courts. It was the eighth edition of the tournament which was part of the 2013 ATP Challenger Tour. It took place in Como, Italy between 26 August and 1 September 2013.

== Singles main draw entrants ==
=== Seeds ===
Country	Player	Rank^{1}	Seed
ESP	Pablo Carreño Busta	76	1
CZE	Jan Hájek	103	2
GER	Teymuraz Gabashvili	120	3
SRB	Dušan Lajović	144	4
BEL	Steve Darcis	151	5
~~ESP~~	~~Pere Riba~~	~~158~~	~~6~~
GER	Simon Greul	162	7
GER	Bastian Knittel	170	8
GER	Dustin Brown	172	9

- ^{1} Rankings are as of August 19, 2013.

=== Other entrants ===
The following players received wildcards into the singles main draw:

- (Italy) Andrea Arnaboldi
- (Italy) Marco Crugnola
- (Italy) Alessandro Giannessi
- (Italy) Gianluca Naso

The following players received entry as an alternate into the singles main draw:

- (Spain) Enrique López Pérez
- (Japan) Taro Daniel

The following players received entry from the qualifying draw:

- (Germany) Moritz Baumann
- (Serbia) Ilija Bozoljac
- (Italy) Lorenzo Giustino
- (Croatia) Mate Pavić

The following players received entry as a lucky loser into the singles main draw:

- (Croatia) Mate Delić

== Champions ==
=== Singles ===
- (Spain) Pablo Carreño Busta def. (Austria) Dominic Thiem 6–2, 5–7, 6–0

=== Doubles ===
- (Australia) Rameez Junaid / (Slovakia) Igor Zelenay def. (Italy) Marco Crugnola / (Italy) Stefano Ianni 7–5, 7–6^{(7–2)}
