= 2021 Città di Como Challenger =

- Date: 30 August – 5 September
- Edition: 15th
- Surface: Clay
- Location: Como, Italy

Champions

Singles
- (Argentina) Juan Manuel Cerúndolo

Doubles
- (Brazil) Rafael Matos / (Brazil) Felipe Meligeni Alves
← 2019 ·	Città di Como Challenger	· 2022 →

The 2021 Città di Como Challenger was a professional tennis tournament played on clay courts. It was the fifteenth edition of the tournament which was part of the 2021 ATP Challenger Tour. It took place in Como, Italy between 30 August and 5 September 2021.

== Singles main-draw entrants ==
=== Seeds ===
Country	Player	Rank^{1}	Seed
GER	Daniel Altmaier	106	1
SVK	Jozef Kovalík	121	2
SVK	Andrej Martin	122	3
ARG	Juan Manuel Cerúndolo	135	4
ITA	Federico Gaio	159	5
IND	Sumit Nagal	165	6
SUI	Marc-Andrea Hüsler	170	7
~~ITA~~	~~Alessandro Giannessi~~	~~171~~	~~8~~

- ^{1} Rankings are as of 23 August 2021.

=== Other entrants ===
The following players received wildcards into the singles main draw:

- (Italy) Flavio Cobolli
- (Italy) Francesco Forti
- (Italy) Federico Iannaccone

The following players received entry into the singles main draw using protected rankings:

- (Italy) Andrea Arnaboldi
- (Belgium) Julien Cagnina
- (Germany) Julian Lenz

The following players received entry into the singles main draw as special exempts:

- (Croatia) Nino Serdarušić
- (Argentina) Camilo Ugo Carabelli

The following players received entry into the singles main draw as alternates:

- (France) Evan Furness
- (Italy) Giulio Zeppieri

The following players received entry from the qualifying draw:

- (Cyprus) Petros Chrysochos
- (Austria) Alexander Erler
- (Austria) Lucas Miedler
- (Italy) Andrea Vavassori

The following players received entry as lucky losers:

- (Italy) Franco Agamenone
- (Russia) Alexey Vatutin

== Champions ==
=== Singles ===
- (Argentina) Juan Manuel Cerúndolo def. (Italy) Gian Marco Moroni 7–5, 7–6^{(9–7)}.

=== Doubles ===
- (Brazil) Rafael Matos / (Brazil) Felipe Meligeni Alves def. (Venezuela) Luis David Martínez / (Italy) Andrea Vavassori 6–7^{(2–7)}, 6–4, [10–6].
