= 2015 Città di Como Challenger – Singles =

Singles
- 2015 Città di Como Challenger

Final
- Champion: (Russia) Andrey Kuznetsov
- Runner-up: (Germany) Daniel Brands
- Score: 6–4, 6–3

Events
Singles	Doubles
← 2014 ·	Città di Como Challenger	· 2016 →

Viktor Troicki was the defending champion but chose not to defend his title. Andrey Kuznetsov won the title, beating Daniel Brands 6–4, 6–3.

== Seeds ==
1. (Spain) Daniel Muñoz de la Nava (withdrew due to a left knee injury)
2. (Russia) Andrey Kuznetsov (champion)
3. (Argentina) Carlos Berlocq (semifinals)
4. (France) Kenny de Schepper (first round)
5. (Italy) Andrea Arnaboldi (quarterfinals)
6. (Uzbekistan) Farrukh Dustov (first round)
7. (Slovakia) Andrej Martin (quarterfinals)
8. (Spain) Roberto Carballés Baena (quarterfinals)

== Draw ==
=== Key ===
- Q = Qualifier
- WC = Wild card
- LL = Lucky loser
- Alt = Alternate
- SE = Special exempt
- PR = Protected ranking
- ITF = ITF entry
- JE = Junior exempt
- w/o = Walkover
- r = Retired
- d = Defaulted
- SR = Special ranking

=== Finals ===
Semifinals
(Germany) Daniel Brands	6	1	6
3	(Argentina) Carlos Berlocq	4	6	3
(Argentina) Pedro Cachin	2	5
2	(Russia) Andrey Kuznetsov	6	7

Final
(Germany) Daniel Brands	4	3
2	(Russia) Andrey Kuznetsov	6	6

=== Top half ===
First round
LL	(France) M Teixeira	6^{8}	3
(Germany) D Brands	7^{10}	6
Alt	(Italy) Erik Crepaldi	5	4
SE	(Italy) L Giustino	7	6
(France) A Musialek	1	3
(Chile) JC Sáez	6	6
Q	(Croatia) M Delić	6	3	5
8	(Spain) R Carballés Baena	3	6	7
3	(Argentina) C Berlocq	6	7^{7}
(Italy) F Gaio	3	6^{5}
Alt	(Brazil) F Romboli	6	1	6
(Netherlands) I Sijsling	3	6	3
(Italy) S Caruso	5	6^{1}
Q	(Italy) R Bonadio	7	7^{7}
WC	(Italy) G Mager	6	4	3
5	(Italy) A Arnaboldi	3	6	6

Second round
(Germany) D Brands	6	3	6
SE	(Italy) L Giustino	4	6	3
(Chile) JC Sáez	3	0
8	(Spain) R Carballés Baena	6	6
3	(Argentina) C Berlocq	6	6
Alt	(Brazil) F Romboli	1	2
Q	(Italy) R Bonadio	3	4
5	(Italy) A Arnaboldi	6	6

Quarterfinals
(Germany) D Brands	7	7^{7}
8	(Spain) R Carballés Baena	5	6^{5}
3	(Argentina) C Berlocq	6	6
5	(Italy) A Arnaboldi	0	1

Semifinals
(Germany) D Brands	6	1	6
3	(Argentina) C Berlocq	4	6	3

=== Bottom half ===
First round
7	(Slovakia) A Martin	7	6
(Italy) F Volandri	5	3
(Slovakia) J Kovalík	6	7^{7}
WC	(Italy) Pietro Licciardi	1	6^{5}
(Argentina) P Cachin	6	6
WC	(Italy) A Basso	3	4
(Italy) G Naso	7^{8}	6^{5}	7^{7}
4	(France) K de Schepper	6^{8}	7^{7}	6^{3}
6	(Uzbekistan) F Dustov	1	1
Q	(Spain) C Gómez-Herrera	6	6
WC	(Italy) Edoardo Eremin	1	2
Q	(Italy) L Sonego	6	6
(Portugal) G Elias	6	6
(Croatia) F Škugor	3	3
(Chile) Hans Podlipnik Castillo	2	3
2	(Russia) A Kuznetsov	6	6

Second round
7	(Slovakia) A Martin	3	6	6
(Slovakia) J Kovalík	6	2	4
(Argentina) P Cachin	6	6
(Italy) G Naso	3	2
Q	(Spain) C Gómez-Herrera	6	6
Q	(Italy) L Sonego	3	0
(Portugal) G Elias	6^{6}	3
2	(Russia) A Kuznetsov	7^{8}	6

Quarterfinals
7	(Slovakia) A Martin	6	6^{2}	3
(Argentina) P Cachin	2	7^{7}	6
Q	(Spain) C Gómez-Herrera	6^{2}	3
2	(Russia) A Kuznetsov	7^{7}	6

Semifinals
(Argentina) P Cachin	2	5
2	(Russia) A Kuznetsov	6	7
