= 2014 Città di Como Challenger – Doubles =

Doubles
- 2014 Città di Como Challenger

Final
- Champions: (Argentina) Guido Andreozzi (Argentina) Facundo Argüello
- Runners-up: (Canada) Steven Diez (Spain) Enrique López-Pérez
- Score: 6–2, 6–2

Events
Singles	Doubles
← 2013 ·	Città di Como Challenger	· 2015 →

Guido Andreozzi and Facundo Argüello were crowned champions, beating Steven Diez and Enrique López-Pérez 6–2, 6–2

== Seeds ==
1. (Germany) Christopher Kas / (Germany) Gero Kretschmer (first round)
2. (Germany) Frank Moser / (Germany) Alexander Satschko (quarterfinals)
3. (Monaco) Benjamin Balleret / (Italy) Alessandro Motti (quarterfinals)
4. (Italy) Andrea Arnaboldi / (Germany) Dominik Meffert (semifinals)

== Draw ==
=== Key ===
- Q = Qualifier
- WC = Wild card
- LL = Lucky loser
- Alt = Alternate
- SE = Special exempt
- PR = Protected ranking
- ITF = ITF entry
- JE = Junior exempt
- w/o = Walkover
- r = Retired
- d = Defaulted
- SR = Special ranking

=== Draw ===
First round
1	(Germany) C Kas (Germany) G Kretschmer	2	3
(Argentina) G Andreozzi (Argentina) F Argüello	6	6
(Bosnia and Herzegovina) M Bašić (France) P-H Herbert	6	6
(Sweden) M Eriksson (Sweden) C Lindell	3	3
4	(Italy) A Arnaboldi (Germany) D Meffert	6	3	[10]
(Serbia) B Pašanski (Netherlands) B Westerhof	2	6	[7]
(Italy) M Cecchinato (Italy) P Starace	3	4
(Serbia) I Bozoljac (Serbia) V Troicki	6	6
WC	(Italy) F Gaio (Italy) Federico Maccari	2	3
(Czech Republic) J Hájek (Slovakia) I Zelenay	6	6
WC	(Italy) P Fanucci (Italy) A Giannessi	3	6	[6]
3	(Monaco) B Balleret (Italy) A Motti	6	3	[10]
(Canada) S Diez (Spain) E López-Pérez	6^{3}	6	[10]
(France) G Burquier (France) J Eysseric	7^{7}	4	[7]
(Italy) Davide Borromini (Italy) Carlo Alberto Fossati	1	2
2	(Germany) F Moser (Germany) A Satschko	6	6

Quarterfinals
(Argentina) G Andreozzi (Argentina) F Argüello	6	3	[10]
(Bosnia and Herzegovina) M Bašić (France) P-H Herbert	4	6	[5]
4	(Italy) A Arnaboldi (Germany) D Meffert	6	7
(Serbia) I Bozoljac (Serbia) V Troicki	4	5
(Czech Republic) J Hájek (Slovakia) I Zelenay	6	6
3	(Monaco) B Balleret (Italy) A Motti	3	2
(Canada) S Diez (Spain) E López-Pérez	4	6	[10]
2	(Germany) F Moser (Germany) A Satschko	6	4	[6]

Semifinals
(Argentina) G Andreozzi (Argentina) F Argüello	6	6
4	(Italy) A Arnaboldi (Germany) D Meffert	2	1
(Czech Republic) J Hájek (Slovakia) I Zelenay	6	4	[6]
(Canada) S Diez (Spain) E López-Pérez	3	6	[10]

Final
(Argentina) G Andreozzi (Argentina) F Argüello	6	6
(Canada) S Diez (Spain) E López-Pérez	2	2
