= 2014 Città di Como Challenger =

- Date: 25–31 August
- Edition: 9th
- Surface: Clay
- Location: Como, Italy

Champions

Singles
- (Serbia) Viktor Troicki

Doubles
- (Argentina) Guido Andreozzi / (Argentina) Facundo Argüello
← 2013 ·	Città di Como Challenger	· 2015 →

The 2014 Città di Como Challenger was a professional tennis tournament played on clay courts. It was the ninth edition of the tournament which was part of the 2014 ATP Challenger Tour. It took place in Como, Italy, between 25 and 31 August 2014.

== Singles main-draw entrants ==
=== Seeds ===
Country	Player	Rank^{1}	Seed
ARG	Facundo Argüello	121	1
FRA	Pierre-Hugues Herbert	136	2
ROM	Adrian Ungur	137	3
ITA	Filippo Volandri	148	4
ROM	Victor Hănescu	150	5
ITA	Potito Starace	156	6
ITA	Marco Cecchinato	160	7
ITA	Andrea Arnaboldi	172	8

- ^{1} Rankings are as of August 18, 2014.

=== Other entrants ===
The following players received wildcards into the singles main draw:

- (Italy) Salvatore Caruso
- (Italy) Matteo Donati
- (Italy) Alessandro Giannessi
- (Italy) Pietro Licciardi

The following players received entry as an alternate into the singles main draw:

- (Bosnia and Herzegovina) Mirza Bašić
- (France) Pierre-Hugues Herbert

The following players received entry from the qualifying draw:

- (Serbia) Boris Pašanski
- (Sweden) Patrik Rosenholm
- (Serbia) Viktor Troicki
- (Estonia) Jürgen Zopp

== Champions ==
=== Singles ===
- (Serbia) Viktor Troicki def. (Republic of Ireland) Louk Sorensen 6–3, 6–2

=== Doubles ===
- (Argentina) Guido Andreozzi / (Argentina) Facundo Argüello def. (Canada) Steven Diez / (Spain) Enrique López Pérez 6–2, 6–2
