= 2025 Città di Como Challenger – Doubles =

Doubles
- 2025 Città di Como Challenger

Final
- Champions: (Romania) Victor Vlad Cornea (Argentina) Santiago Rodríguez Taverna
- Runners-up: (Israel) Daniel Cukierman (Denmark) Johannes Ingildsen
- Score: 6–3, 6–2

Events
Singles	Doubles
- Como Lake Challenger

Victor Vlad Cornea and Denys Molchanov were the defending champions but only Cornea chose to defend his title, partnering Santiago Rodríguez Taverna. He successfully defended his title after defeating Daniel Cukierman and Johannes Ingildsen 6–3, 6–2 in the final.

== Seeds ==
1. (Poland) Piotr Matuszewski / (Netherlands) Mick Veldheer (semifinals)
2. (Israel) Daniel Cukierman / (Denmark) Johannes Ingildsen (final)
3. Ivan Liutarevich / (Italy) Giorgio Ricca (semifinals)
4. (Romania) Victor Vlad Cornea / (Argentina) Santiago Rodríguez Taverna (champions)

== Draw ==
Key

- Q = Qualifier
- WC = Wild card
- LL = Lucky loser
- Alt = Alternate
- ITF = ITF entry
- PR = Protected ranking
- SR = Special ranking
- SE = Special exempt
- JE = Junior exempt
- JR = Junior Accelerator Programme entrant
- CO = College Accelerator Programme entrant
- NG = Next Gen Accelerator Program entrant
- w/o = Walkover
- r = Retired
- d = Defaulted

=== Draw ===
First round
1	(Poland) P Matuszewski (Netherlands) M Veldheer	6	6
(Romania) A Jecan (Romania) B Pavel	4	3
(India) A Kalyanpur (India) Parikshit Somani	6	2	[14]
(Czech Republic) Jiří Barnat (Czech Republic) F Duda	4	6	[16]
4	(Romania) V Cornea (Argentina) S Rodríguez Taverna	7^{7}	7^{8}
(Italy) F Bondioli (Italy) CA Caniato	6^{2}	6^{6}
WC	(Italy) Lorenzo Carboni (Italy) Rocco Piatti	3	6^{4}
(Serbia) S Latinović (Germany) T Rühl	6	7^{7}
(Switzerland) K Feldbausch (France) G Jacq	6	6^{1}	[10]
Alt	(Italy) Tommaso Compagnucci (Croatia) L Mikrut	3	7^{7}	[7]
WC	(Italy) Pierluigi Basile (Italy) J Vasamì	7^{7}	3	[5]
3	I Liutarevich (Italy) G Ricca	6^{4}	6	[10]
(Slovakia) A Martin (Ukraine) O Prihodko	w/o
(Italy) F Arnaboldi (Italy) J Berrettini
(Peru) G Bueno (Ecuador) Á Guillén Meza	4	2
2	(Israel) D Cukierman (Denmark) J Ingildsen	6	6

Quarterfinals
1	(Poland) P Matuszewski (Netherlands) M Veldheer	6^{5}	6	[10]
(Czech Republic) J Barnat (Czech Republic) F Duda	7^{7}	4	[8]
4	(Romania) V Cornea (Argentina) S Rodríguez Taverna	6	7^{7}
(Serbia) S Latinović (Germany) T Rühl	2	6^{3}
(Switzerland) K Feldbausch (France) G Jacq	4	6^{5}
3	I Liutarevich (Italy) G Ricca	6	7^{7}
(Slovakia) A Martin (Ukraine) O Prihodko
2	(Israel) D Cukierman (Denmark) J Ingildsen	w/o

Semifinals
1	(Poland) P Matuszewski (Netherlands) M Veldheer	5	6	[7]
4	(Romania) V Cornea (Argentina) S Rodríguez Taverna	7	2	[10]
3	I Liutarevich (Italy) G Ricca	4	6	[7]
2	(Israel) D Cukierman (Denmark) J Ingildsen	6	0	[10]

Final
4	(Romania) V Cornea (Argentina) S Rodríguez Taverna	6	6
2	(Israel) D Cukierman (Denmark) J Ingildsen	3	2
