= 2022 Città di Como Challenger – Singles =

Singles
- 2022 Città di Como Challenger

Final
- Champion: (Germany) Cedrik-Marcel Stebe
- Runner-up: (Italy) Francesco Passaro
- Score: 7–6^{(7–2)}, 6–4

Events
Singles	Doubles
← 2021 ·	Città di Como Challenger	· 2023 →

Juan Manuel Cerúndolo was the defending champion but chose not to defend his title.

Cedrik-Marcel Stebe won the title after defeating Francesco Passaro 7–6^{(7–2)}, 6–4 in the final.

== Seeds ==
1. (Italy) Marco Cecchinato (first round)
2. (Italy) Giulio Zeppieri (second round)
3. (Italy) Francesco Passaro (final)
4. (Serbia) Nikola Milojević (first round)
5. (Italy) Matteo Arnaldi (semifinals, retired)
6. (Italy) Riccardo Bonadio (quarterfinals)
7. (Italy) Stefano Travaglia (first round)
8. (Italy) Andrea Arnaboldi (first round)

== Draw ==
=== Key ===
- Q = Qualifier
- WC = Wild card
- LL = Lucky loser
- Alt = Alternate
- SE = Special exempt
- PR = Protected ranking
- ITF = ITF entry
- JE = Junior exempt
- w/o = Walkover
- r = Retired
- d = Defaulted
- SR = Special ranking

=== Finals ===
Semifinals
5	(Italy) Matteo Arnaldi	1	1^{r}
(Germany) Cedrik-Marcel Stebe	6	4
3	(Italy) Francesco Passaro	6	6
(Slovakia) Lukáš Klein	4	1

Final
(Germany) Cedrik-Marcel Stebe	7^{7}	6
3	(Italy) Francesco Passaro	6^{2}	4

=== Top half ===
First round
1	(Italy) M Cecchinato	7^{7}	6^{2}	1
(Bosnia and Herzegovina) N Fatić	6^{2}	7^{7}	6
(Finland) O Virtanen	6	6^{2}	1^{r}
Alt	(Austria) L Miedler	2	7^{7}	3
(Argentina) JB Torres	1	7	3
Q	(Italy) G Oradini	6	5	6
(Ukraine) V Sachko	2	0^{r}
5	(Italy) M Arnaldi	6	0
4	(Serbia) N Milojević	6^{2}	5
SE	(Germany) Lucas Gerch	7^{7}	7
(Bosnia and Herzegovina) M Bašić	4	0
(Germany) C-M Stebe	6	6
(Italy) A Giannessi	6	3	0^{r}
LL	(France) K de Schepper	4	6	1
Q	(Romania) M Copil	7^{7}	4	7^{7}
8	(Italy) A Arnaboldi	6^{4}	6	6^{2}

Second round
(Bosnia and Herzegovina) N Fatić	6	6
Alt	(Austria) L Miedler	3	3
Q	(Italy) G Oradini	6	5	2
5	(Italy) M Arnaldi	2	7	6
SE	(Germany) L Gerch	6	3	2
(Germany) C-M Stebe	4	6	6
LL	(France) K de Schepper	5	6	7
Q	(Romania) M Copil	7	4	5

Quarterfinals
(Bosnia and Herzegovina) N Fatić	5	6	6^{4}
5	(Italy) M Arnaldi	7	2	7^{7}
(Germany) C-M Stebe	6	6
LL	(France) K de Schepper	3	2

Semifinals
5	(Italy) M Arnaldi	1	1^{r}
(Germany) C-M Stebe	6	4

=== Bottom half ===
First round
7	(Italy) S Travaglia	3	4
(Serbia) M Zekić	6	6
WC	(Italy) M Gigante	6^{4}	6	6
(Italy) GM Moroni	7^{7}	2	1
(Bosnia and Herzegovina) D Džumhur	7	6
Alt	(Ukraine) O Krutykh	5	3
Q	(United States) N Moreno de Alboran	6^{5}	6	3
3	(Italy) F Passaro	7^{7}	4	6
6	(Italy) R Bonadio	6	6^{4}	7^{7}
(Argentina) G Villanueva	4	7^{7}	6^{5}
Q	(Bulgaria) A Andreev	6^{4}	6	3
WC	(Italy) F Arnaboldi	7^{7}	1	6
WC	(Italy) G Ferrari	6	1	4
(Slovakia) L Klein	4	6	6
Q	(Romania) C Crețu	6^{1}	2
2	(Italy) G Zeppieri	7^{7}	6

Second round
(Serbia) M Zekić	3	6	6^{5}
WC	(Italy) M Gigante	6	3	7^{7}
(Bosnia and Herzegovina) D Džumhur	2	5
3	(Italy) F Passaro	6	7
6	(Italy) R Bonadio	6	6
WC	(Italy) F Arnaboldi	2	3
(Slovakia) L Klein	7^{7}	2	7^{10}
2	(Italy) G Zeppieri	6^{5}	6	6^{8}

Quarterfinals
WC	(Italy) M Gigante	7^{7}	1	5
3	(Italy) F Passaro	6^{4}	6	7
6	(Italy) R Bonadio	6	2	4
(Slovakia) L Klein	4	6	6

Semifinals
3	(Italy) F Passaro	6	6
(Slovakia) L Klein	4	1
