= 2012 Città di Como Challenger =

- Date: 27 August – 2 September
- Edition: 7th
- Surface: Clay
- Location: Como, Italy

Champions

Singles
- (Austria) Andreas Haider-Maurer

Doubles
- (Germany) Philipp Marx / (Romania) Florin Mergea
← 2011 ·	Città di Como Challenger	· 2013 →

The 2012 Città di Como Challenger was a professional tennis tournament played on clay courts. It was the seventh edition of the tournament which was part of the 2012 ATP Challenger Tour. It took place in Como, Italy between 27 August and 2 September 2012.

== Singles main draw entrants ==
=== Seeds ===
Country	Player	Rank^{1}	Seed
POR	Frederico Gil	114	1
POR	João Sousa	121	2
AUT	Andreas Haider-Maurer	157	3
ITA	Matteo Viola	158	4
KAZ	Andrey Golubev	162	5
ITA	Alessandro Giannessi	164	6
CHI	Paul Capdeville	167	7
SVK	Pavol Červenák	176	8

- ^{1} Rankings are as of August 20, 2012.

=== Other entrants ===
The following players received wildcards into the singles main draw:

- (Italy) Andrea Arnaboldi
- (Italy) Marco Cecchinato
- (Italy) Marco Crugnola
- (Chile) Nicolás Massú

The following players received entry as an alternate into the singles main draw:

- (Switzerland) Michael Lammer
- (Austria) Michael Linzer
- (France) Stéphane Robert

The following players received entry from the qualifying draw:

- (Germany) Andre Begemann
- (Italy) Alberto Brizzi
- (Kazakhstan) Evgeny Korolev
- (Switzerland) Yann Marti

== Champions ==
=== Singles ===
- (Austria) Andreas Haider-Maurer def. (Portugal) João Sousa, 6–3, 6–4

=== Doubles ===
- (Germany) Philipp Marx / (Romania) Florin Mergea def. (Australia) Colin Ebelthite / (Czech Republic) Jaroslav Pospíšil, 6–4, 4–6, [10–4]
