= 2025 Città di Como Challenger – Singles =

Singles
- 2025 Città di Como Challenger

Final
- Champion: (Croatia) Luka Mikrut
- Runner-up: (Croatia) Duje Ajduković
- Score: 6–3, 7–5

Events
Singles	Doubles
- Città di Como Challenger

Gabriel Debru was the defending champion but chose not to defend his title.

Luka Mikrut won the title after defeating Duje Ajduković 6–3, 7–5 in the final.

== Seeds ==
1. (Norway) Nicolai Budkov Kjær (semifinals)
2. (Brazil) Thiago Monteiro (quarterfinals)
3. (Kazakhstan) Timofey Skatov (first round)
4. (Peru) Gonzalo Bueno (second round)
5. (Argentina) Santiago Rodríguez Taverna (first round)
6. (Italy) Stefano Travaglia (second round, retired)
7. (Ecuador) Álvaro Guillén Meza (second round)
8. Ivan Gakhov (first round)

== Draw ==
Key

- Q = Qualifier
- WC = Wild card
- LL = Lucky loser
- Alt = Alternate
- ITF = ITF entry
- PR = Protected ranking
- SR = Special ranking
- SE = Special exempt
- JE = Junior exempt
- JR = Junior Accelerator Programme entrant
- CO = College Accelerator Programme entrant
- NG = Next Gen Accelerator Program entrant
- w/o = Walkover
- r = Retired
- d = Defaulted

=== Finals ===
Semifinals
1	(Norway) Nicolai Budkov Kjær	6	1	4
Alt	(Croatia) Luka Mikrut	4	6	6
(Argentina) Juan Bautista Torres	6^{2}	4
(Croatia) Duje Ajduković	7^{7}	6

Final
Alt	(Croatia) Luka Mikrut	6	7
(Croatia) Duje Ajduković	3	5

=== Top half ===
First round
1	(Norway) N Budkov Kjær	7^{7}	6
Alt	(Germany) C-M Stebe	6^{5}	4
WC	(Italy) F Bondioli	2	6	3
Q	(Italy) G Fonio	6	3	6
Q	(Italy) R Brancaccio	6	7
NG	(Switzerland) K Feldbausch	2	5
Alt	(Italy) F Arnaboldi	4	2
7	(Ecuador) Á Guillén Meza	6	6
4	(Peru) G Bueno	3	6	6
(Argentina) F Díaz Acosta	6	3	4
Q	(Germany) H Squire	7^{7}	6
Q	(Italy) Tommaso Compagnucci	6^{5}	2
LL	(Spain) I Montes de la Torre	0	6	3
Alt	(Croatia) L Mikrut	6	4	6
WC	(Italy) CA Caniato	4	6	6
5	(Argentina) S Rodríguez Taverna	6	3	1

Second round
1	(Norway) N Budkov Kjær	6	7^{10}
Q	(Italy) G Fonio	4	6^{8}
Q	(Italy) R Brancaccio	6	6
7	(Ecuador) Á Guillén Meza	2	3
4	(Peru) G Bueno	3	4
Q	(Germany) H Squire	6	6
Alt	(Croatia) L Mikrut	1	6	6
WC	(Italy) CA Caniato	6	3	2

Quarterfinals
1	(Norway) N Budkov Kjær	7	6
Q	(Italy) R Brancaccio	5	2
Q	(Germany) H Squire	3	4
Alt	(Croatia) L Mikrut	6	6

Semifinals
1	(Norway) N Budkov Kjær	6	1	4
Alt	(Croatia) L Mikrut	4	6	6

=== Bottom half ===
First round
6	(Italy) S Travaglia	6	6
Q	(Italy) Gabriele Pennaforti	4	2
(Spain) P Martín Tiffon	6	3	3
(Argentina) JB Torres	4	6	6
(Italy) J Berrettini	2	6	6
Alt	(Argentina) LE Ambrogi	6	2	3
WC	(Italy) Lorenzo Carboni	0	6	6
3	(Kazakhstan) T Skatov	6	1	0
8	I Gakhov	1	6^{5}
(Croatia) D Ajduković	6	7^{7}
Q	(Romania) GA Boitan	4	2
(Ukraine) O Prihodko	6	6
(Romania) FC Jianu	4	3
Alt	(Slovakia) A Martin	6	6
(Switzerland) A Ritschard	2^{r}
2	(Brazil) T Monteiro	4

Second round
6	(Italy) S Travaglia	6	5	0^{r}
(Argentina) JB Torres	1	7	3
(Italy) J Berrettini	6	6
WC	(Italy) L Carboni	4	4
(Croatia) D Ajduković	7^{7}	6
(Ukraine) O Prihodko	6^{4}	3
Alt	(Slovakia) A Martin	3	4
2	(Brazil) T Monteiro	6	6

Quarterfinals
(Argentina) JB Torres	3	6	7^{9}
(Italy) J Berrettini	6	2	6^{7}
(Croatia) D Ajduković	6	4	6
2	(Brazil) T Monteiro	3	6	4

Semifinals
(Argentina) JB Torres	6^{2}	4
(Croatia) D Ajduković	7^{7}	6
