= 2016 Città di Como Challenger =

Professional tennis tournament

- Date: 29 August – 4 September
- Edition: 11th
- Surface: Clay
- Location: Como, Italy

Champions

Singles
- (France) Kenny de Schepper

Doubles
- (Czech Republic) Roman Jebavý / (Slovakia) Andrej Martin
← 2015 ·	Città di Como Challenger	· 2017 →

The 2016 Città di Como Challenger was a professional tennis tournament played on clay courts. It was the eleventh edition of the tournament which was part of the 2016 ATP Challenger Tour. It took place in Como, Italy between 29 August – 4 September 2016.

== Singles main-draw entrants ==
=== Seeds ===
Country	Player	Rank^{1}	Seed
AUT	Gerald Melzer	91	1
ESP	Roberto Carballés Baena	103	2
JPN	Taro Daniel	104	3
SVK	Andrej Martin	121	4
ARG	Marco Trungelliti	129	5
ARG	Leonardo Mayer	131	6
ESP	Albert Montañés	135	7
ITA	Marco Cecchinato	137	8

- ^{1} Rankings are as of August 22, 2016.

=== Other entrants ===
The following players received wildcards into the singles main draw:

- (Italy) Lorenzo Sonego
- (Italy) Gianluca Mager
- (Italy) Gianluigi Quinzi
- (Italy) Andrea Pellegrino

The following player received entry as an alternate:

- (Germany) Maximilian Marterer

The following players received entry from the qualifying draw:

- (Italy) Andrea Vavassori
- (Argentina) Pedro Cachin
- (Sweden) Mikael Ymer
- (Serbia) Danilo Petrović

The following player received entry as a lucky loser:

- (Argentina) Andrea Collarini

== Champions ==
=== Singles ===
- (France) Kenny de Schepper def. (Italy) Marco Cecchinato, 2–6, 7–6^{(7–0)}, 7–5.

=== Doubles ===
- (Czech Republic) Roman Jebavý / (Slovakia) Andrej Martin def. (Germany) Nils Langer / (Austria) Gerald Melzer, 3–6, 6–1, [10–5].
