= 2022 Città di Como Challenger =

- Date: 29 August – 4 September
- Edition: 16th
- Surface: Clay
- Location: Como, Italy

Champions

Singles
- (Germany) Cedrik-Marcel Stebe

Doubles
- (Austria) Alexander Erler / (Austria) Lucas Miedler
← 2021 ·	Città di Como Challenger	· 2023 →

The 2022 Città di Como Challenger was a professional tennis tournament played on clay courts. It was the sixteenth edition of the tournament which was part of the 2022 ATP Challenger Tour. It took place in Como, Italy between 29 August and 4 September 2022.

== Singles main-draw entrants ==
=== Seeds ===
Country	Player	Rank^{1}	Seed
ITA	Marco Cecchinato	141	1
ITA	Giulio Zeppieri	146	2
ITA	Francesco Passaro	148	3
SRB	Nikola Milojević	181	4
ITA	Matteo Arnaldi	188	5
ITA	Riccardo Bonadio	189	6
ITA	Stefano Travaglia	190	7
ITA	Andrea Arnaboldi	197	8

- ^{1} Rankings are as of 22 August 2022.

=== Other entrants ===
The following players received wildcards into the singles main draw:

- (Italy) Federico Arnaboldi
- (Italy) Gianmarco Ferrari
- (Italy) Matteo Gigante

The following player received entry into the singles main draw as a special exempt:

- (Germany) Lucas Gerch

The following players received entry into the singles main draw as alternates:

- (Ukraine) Oleksii Krutykh
- (Austria) Lucas Miedler

The following players received entry from the qualifying draw:

- (Bulgaria) Adrian Andreev
- (Romania) Marius Copil
- (Romania) Cezar Crețu
- (United States) Nicolas Moreno de Alboran
- (Argentina) ~~Mariano Navone~~
- (Italy) Giovanni Oradini

The following player received entry as a lucky loser:

- (France) Kenny de Schepper

== Champions ==
=== Singles ===
- (Germany) Cedrik-Marcel Stebe def. (Italy) Francesco Passaro 7–6^{(7–2)}, 6–4.

=== Doubles ===
- (Austria) Alexander Erler / (Austria) Lucas Miedler def. (Jamaica) Dustin Brown / (Germany) Julian Lenz 6–1, 7–6^{(7–3)}.
