= 2025 Città di Como Challenger =

- Date: 25 August – 1 September
- Edition: 19th
- Surface: Clay
- Location: Como, Italy

Champions

Singles
- (Croatia) Luka Mikrut

Doubles
- (Romania) Victor Vlad Cornea / (Argentina) Santiago Rodríguez Taverna
- Città di Como Challenger

The 2025 Como Lake Challenger was a professional tennis tournament played on clay courts. It was the 19th edition of the tournament which was part of the 2025 ATP Challenger Tour. It took place in Como, Italy between 25 August and 1 September 2025.

== Singles main-draw entrants ==
=== Seeds ===
Country	Player	Rank^{1}	Seed
NOR	Nicolai Budkov Kjær	162	1
BRA	Thiago Monteiro	170	2
KAZ	Timofey Skatov	193	3
PER	Gonzalo Bueno	210	4
ARG	Santiago Rodríguez Taverna	211	5
ITA	Stefano Travaglia	212	6
ECU	Álvaro Guillén Meza	248	7
	Ivan Gakhov	252	8

- ^{1} Rankings are as of 18 August 2025.

=== Other entrants ===
The following players received wildcards into the singles main draw:

- (Italy) Federico Bondioli
- (Italy) Carlo Alberto Caniato
- (Italy) Lorenzo Carboni

The following player received entry into the singles main draw through the Next Gen Accelerator programme:

- (Switzerland) Kilian Feldbausch

The following players received entry into the singles main draw as alternates:

- (Argentina) Luciano Emanuel Ambrogi
- (Italy) Federico Arnaboldi
- (Slovakia) Andrej Martin
- (Croatia) Luka Mikrut
- (Germany) Cedrik-Marcel Stebe

The following players received entry from the qualifying draw:

- (Romania) Gabi Adrian Boitan
- (Italy) Raúl Brancaccio
- (Italy) Tommaso Compagnucci
- (Italy) Giovanni Fonio
- (Italy) Gabriele Pennaforti
- (Germany) Henri Squire

The following player received entry as a lucky loser:

- (Spain) Iñaki Montes de la Torre

== Champions ==
=== Singles ===
- (Croatia) Luka Mikrut def. (Croatia) Duje Ajduković 6–3, 7–5.

=== Doubles ===
- (Romania) Victor Vlad Cornea / (Argentina) Santiago Rodríguez Taverna def. (Israel) Daniel Cukierman / (Denmark) Johannes Ingildsen 6–3, 6–2.
