= 2022 Città di Como Challenger – Doubles =

Doubles
- 2022 Città di Como Challenger

Final
- Champions: (Austria) Alexander Erler (Austria) Lucas Miedler
- Runners-up: (Jamaica) Dustin Brown (Germany) Julian Lenz
- Score: 6–1, 7–6^{(7–3)}

Events
| Singles | Doubles |
- Città di Como Challenger

Rafael Matos and Felipe Meligeni Alves were the defending champions but chose not to defend their title.

Alexander Erler and Lucas Miedler won the title after defeating Dustin Brown and Julian Lenz 6–1, 7–6^{(7–3)} in the final.

== Seeds ==
1. (Austria) Alexander Erler / (Austria) Lucas Miedler (champions)
2. (Czech Republic) Roman Jebavý / (Czech Republic) Adam Pavlásek (first round)
3. (Germany) Fabian Fallert / (Germany) Hendrik Jebens (withdrew)
4. (Uzbekistan) Sanjar Fayziev / (Ukraine) Vladyslav Manafov (first round)
5. (Uruguay) Martín Cuevas / (Switzerland) Luca Margaroli (withdrew)

== Draw ==
Key

- Q = Qualifier
- WC = Wild card
- LL = Lucky loser
- Alt = Alternate
- ITF = ITF entry
- PR = Protected ranking
- SR = Special ranking
- SE = Special exempt
- JE = Junior exempt
- JR = Junior Accelerator Programme entrant
- CO = College Accelerator Programme entrant
- NG = Next Gen Accelerator Program entrant
- w/o = Walkover
- r = Retired
- d = Defaulted

First round
1 | (Austria) A Erler (Austria) L Miedler | 6 | 6
Alt | (Italy) F Passaro (Italy) Davide Pozzi | 3 | 2
(Serbia) N Milojević (Serbia) M Zekić | 7^{7} | 6
WC | (Italy) Lorenzo Ferri (Monaco) Rocco Piatti | 6^{3} | 1
Alt | (Italy) A Arnaboldi (Italy) F Arnaboldi | 4 | 6 | [10]
(Bosnia and Herzegovina) M Bašić (Bosnia and Herzegovina) D Džumhur | 6 | 4 | [7]
(Austria) D Pichler (Ukraine) V Sachko | 6 | 6
(Italy) F Forti (Italy) G Zeppieri | 2 | 2
(Slovakia) L Klein (Slovakia) I Zelenay | 6 | 6
(Romania) M Copil (Romania) A Jecan | 2 | 4
(Jamaica) D Brown (Germany) J Lenz | 4 | 7 | [10]
4 | (Uzbekistan) S Fayziev (Ukraine) V Manafov | 6 | 5 | [5]
(Germany) C Frantzen (Germany) K Wehnelt | 6 | 4 | [8]
WC | (Italy) G Ferrari (Italy) G Piraino | 4 | 6 | [10]
(Norway) V Durasovic (Finland) O Virtanen | 6 | 4 | [13]
2 | (Czech Republic) R Jebavý (Czech Republic) A Pavlásek | 3 | 6 | [11]

Quarterfinals
1 | (Austria) A Erler (Austria) L Miedler | 6 | 6
(Serbia) N Milojević (Serbia) M Zekić | 1 | 4
Alt | (Italy) A Arnaboldi (Italy) F Arnaboldi | 6 | 3 | [8]
(Austria) D Pichler (Ukraine) V Sachko | 3 | 6 | [10]
(Slovakia) L Klein (Slovakia) I Zelenay | 4 | 6 | [5]
(Jamaica) D Brown (Germany) J Lenz | 6 | 4 | [10]
WC | (Italy) G Ferrari (Italy) G Piraino | 4 | 3
(Norway) V Durasovic (Finland) O Virtanen | 6 | 6

Semifinals
1 | (Austria) A Erler (Austria) L Miedler | 7^{7} | 6
(Austria) D Pichler (Ukraine) V Sachko | 6^{3} | 4
(Jamaica) D Brown (Germany) J Lenz | 7^{7} | 7^{7}
(Norway) V Durasovic (Finland) O Virtanen | 6^{3} | 6^{4}

Final
1 | (Austria) A Erler (Austria) L Miedler | 6 | 7^{7}
(Jamaica) D Brown (Germany) J Lenz | 1 | 6^{3}
