= 2017 Città di Como Challenger =

- Date: 28 August – 3 September
- Edition: 12th
- Surface: Clay
- Location: Como, Italy

Champions

Singles
- (Portugal) Pedro Sousa

Doubles
- (Netherlands) Sander Arends / (Croatia) Antonio Šančić
| ← 2016 · | Città di Como Challenger | · 2018 → |

The 2017 Città di Como Challenger was a professional tennis tournament played on clay courts. It was the twelfth edition of the tournament which was part of the 2017 ATP Challenger Tour. It took place in Como, Italy between 28 August – 3 September 2017.

== Singles main-draw entrants ==
=== Seeds ===
| Country | Player | Rank^{1} | Seed |
|---|---|---|---|
| ITA | Marco Cecchinato | 101 | 1 |
| POL | Jerzy Janowicz | 108 | 2 |
| SRB | Filip Krajinović | 111 | 3 |
| POR | Pedro Sousa | 125 | 4 |
| ~~ESP~~ | ~~Roberto Carballés Baena~~ | ~~127~~ | ~~5~~ |
| ESP | Guillermo García López | 136 | 6 |
| GER | Oscar Otte | 145 | 7 |
| FRA | Kenny de Schepper | 147 | 8 |

- ^{1} Rankings are as of 21 August 2017.

=== Other entrants ===
The following players received wildcards into the singles main draw:

- (Italy) Riccardo Balzerani
- (Italy) Alessandro Coppini
- (Italy) Matteo Donati
- (Italy) Julian Ocleppo

The following player received entry into the singles main draw as a special exempt:

- (Sweden) Elias Ymer

The following players received entry from the qualifying draw:

- (Italy) Gianluca Di Nicola
- (Austria) Lenny Hampel
- (France) Constant Lestienne
- (France) Corentin Moutet

The following players received entry as lucky losers:

- (Italy) Federico Gaio
- (Poland) Kamil Majchrzak

== Champions ==
=== Singles ===
- (Portugal) Pedro Sousa def. (Italy) Marco Cecchinato 1–6, 6–2, 6–4.

=== Doubles ===
- (Netherlands) Sander Arends / (Croatia) Antonio Šančić def. (Belarus) Aliaksandr Bury / (Germany) Kevin Krawietz 7–6^{(7–1)}, 6–2.
