= 2015 Città di Como Challenger =

- Date: 31 August – 6 September
- Edition: 10th
- Surface: Clay
- Location: Como, Italy

Champions

Singles
- (Russia) Andrey Kuznetsov

Doubles
- (Germany) Gero Kretschmer / (Germany) Alexander Satschko
← 2014 ·	Città di Como Challenger	· 2016 →

The 2015 Città di Como Challenger was a professional tennis tournament played on clay courts. It was the tenth edition of the tournament which was part of the 2015 ATP Challenger Tour. It took place in Como, Italy, between 31 August and 6 September 2015.

== Singles main-draw entrants ==
=== Seeds ===
Country	Player	Rank^{1}	Seed
ESP	~~Daniel Muñoz de la Nava~~	~~105~~	1
RUS	Andrey Kuznetsov	118	2
ARG	Carlos Berlocq	141	3
FRA	Kenny de Schepper	145	4
ITA	Andrea Arnaboldi	154	5
UZB	Farrukh Dustov	157	6
SVK	Andrej Martin	158	7
ESP	Roberto Carballés Baena	159	8

- ^{1} Rankings are as of August 24, 2015.

=== Other entrants ===
The following players received wildcards into the singles main draw:

- (Italy) Andrea Basso
- (Italy) Edoardo Eremin
- (Italy) Gianluca Mager
- (Italy) Pietro Licciardi

The following players received entry as an alternate into the singles main draw:

- (Italy) Erik Crepaldi
- (Brazil) Fernando Romboli

The following players received entry as a special exempt into the singles main draw:

- (Italy) Lorenzo Giustino

The following players received entry from the qualifying draw:

- (Italy) Riccardo Bonadio
- (Croatia) Mate Delić
- (Italy) Lorenzo Sonego
- (Spain) Carlos Gómez-Herrera

The following player received entry by a lucky loser spot:

- (France) Maxime Teixeira

== Champions ==
=== Singles ===
- (Russia) Andrey Kuznetsov def. (Germany) Daniel Brands 6–4, 6–3

=== Doubles ===
- (Germany) Gero Kretschmer / (Germany) Alexander Satschko def. (France) Kenny de Schepper / (France) Maxime Teixeira 7–6^{(7–3)}, 6–4
