= 2017 Città di Como Challenger – Singles =

Singles
- 2017 Città di Como Challenger

Final
- Champion: (Portugal) Pedro Sousa
- Runner-up: (Italy) Marco Cecchinato
- Score: 1–6, 6–2, 6–4

Events
Singles	Doubles
- Città di Como Challenger

Kenny de Schepper was the defending champion but lost in the quarterfinals to Pedro Sousa.

Sousa won the title after defeating Marco Cecchinato 1–6, 6–2, 6–4 in the final.

== Seeds ==
1. (Italy) Marco Cecchinato (final)
2. (Poland) Jerzy Janowicz (second round)
3. (Serbia) Filip Krajinović (semifinals)
4. (Portugal) Pedro Sousa (champion)
5. (Spain) Roberto Carballés Baena (withdrew)
6. (Spain) Guillermo García López (second round)
7. (Germany) Oscar Otte (quarterfinals)
8. (France) Kenny de Schepper (quarterfinals)

== Draw ==
Key

- Q = Qualifier
- WC = Wild card
- LL = Lucky loser
- Alt = Alternate
- ITF = ITF entry
- PR = Protected ranking
- SR = Special ranking
- SE = Special exempt
- JE = Junior exempt
- JR = Junior Accelerator Programme entrant
- CO = College Accelerator Programme entrant
- NG = Next Gen Accelerator Program entrant
- w/o = Walkover
- r = Retired
- d = Defaulted

=== Finals ===
Semifinals
1	(Italy) Marco Cecchinato	5	6	6
3	(Serbia) Filip Krajinović	7	2	3
4	(Portugal) Pedro Sousa	4	6	6
Q	(France) Corentin Moutet	6	4	4

Final
1	(Italy) Marco Cecchinato	6	2	4
4	(Portugal) Pedro Sousa	1	6	6

=== Top half ===
First round
1	(Italy) M Cecchinato	6	6
(Portugal) G Oliveira	1	2
WC	(Italy) Riccardo Balzerani	7	6
WC	(Italy) Alessandro Coppini	5	3
(Germany) Jeremy Jahn	6	6
(Canada) S Diez	1	2
WC	(Italy) J Ocleppo	6^{1}	0
7	(Germany) O Otte	7^{7}	6
3	(Serbia) F Krajinović	6	6
(Kazakhstan) D Popko	1	1
Q	(France) C Lestienne	4	2
(France) M Bourgue	6	6
(Italy) S Napolitano	7^{7}	3	3
(Portugal) G Elias	6^{3}	6	6
(Canada) F Auger-Aliassime	6	6
Q	(Italy) Gianluca Di Nicola	1	4

Second round
1	(Italy) M Cecchinato	6	6
WC	(Italy) R Balzerani	2	0
(Germany) J Jahn	4	6	3
7	(Germany) O Otte	6	2	6
3	(Serbia) F Krajinović	6	2
(France) M Bourgue	2	0^{r}
(Portugal) G Elias	7	6
(Canada) F Auger-Aliassime	5	4

Quarterfinals
1	(Italy) M Cecchinato	6	6
7	(Germany) O Otte	3	2
3	(Serbia) F Krajinović	6^{6}	6	6
(Portugal) G Elias	7^{8}	2	3

Semifinals
1	(Italy) M Cecchinato	5	6	6
3	(Serbia) F Krajinović	7	2	3

=== Bottom half ===
First round
8	(France) K de Schepper	7^{7}	6
LL	(Italy) F Gaio	6^{2}	2
(Germany) D Masur	2	2
(Spain) T Robredo	6	6
(Italy) A Arnaboldi	6	6
(Italy) S Caruso	2	4
SE	(Sweden) E Ymer	4	0
4	(Portugal) P Sousa	6	6
6	(Spain) G García López	7^{7}	3
(Spain) J Munar	6^{5}	0^{r}
Q	(France) C Moutet	6	6
(Russia) T Gabashvili	2	4
WC	(Italy) M Donati	5	6	6
Q	(Austria) Lenny Hampel	7	2	3
LL	(Poland) K Majchrzak	3	4
2	(Poland) J Janowicz	6	6

Second round
8	(France) K de Schepper	6	6
(Spain) T Robredo	3	3
(Italy) A Arnaboldi	6	3	2
4	(Portugal) P Sousa	3	6	6
6	(Spain) G García López	4	3
Q	(France) C Moutet	6	6
WC	(Italy) M Donati	7^{7}	7^{7}
2	(Poland) J Janowicz	6^{5}	6^{1}

Quarterfinals
8	(France) K de Schepper	3	4
4	(Portugal) P Sousa	6	6
Q	(France) C Moutet	3	7	6
WC	(Italy) M Donati	6	5	3

Semifinals
4	(Portugal) P Sousa	4	6	6
Q	(France) C Moutet	6	4	4
