= 2017 Città di Como Challenger – Doubles =

Doubles
- 2017 Città di Como Challenger

Final
- Champions: (Netherlands) Sander Arends (Croatia) Antonio Šančić
- Runners-up: (Belarus) Aliaksandr Bury (Germany) Kevin Krawietz
- Score: 7–6^{(7–1)}, 6–2

Events
Singles	Doubles
- Città di Como Challenger

Roman Jebavý and Andrej Martin were the defending champions but chose not to defend their title.

Sander Arends and Antonio Šančić won the title after defeating Aliaksandr Bury and Kevin Krawietz 7–6^{(7–1)}, 6–2 in the final.

== Seeds ==
1. (Netherlands) Sander Arends / (Croatia) Antonio Šančić (champions)
2. (Belarus) Aliaksandr Bury / (Germany) Kevin Krawietz (final)
3. (Uruguay) Ariel Behar / (United Kingdom) Joe Salisbury (semifinals)
4. (Sweden) Johan Brunström / (Slovakia) Igor Zelenay (quarterfinals)

== Draw ==
Key

- Q = Qualifier
- WC = Wild card
- LL = Lucky loser
- Alt = Alternate
- ITF = ITF entry
- PR = Protected ranking
- SR = Special ranking
- SE = Special exempt
- JE = Junior exempt
- JR = Junior Accelerator Programme entrant
- CO = College Accelerator Programme entrant
- NG = Next Gen Accelerator Program entrant
- w/o = Walkover
- r = Retired
- d = Defaulted

First round
1	(Netherlands) S Arends (Croatia) A Šančić	7	6
(Portugal) G Elias (Portugal) G Oliveira	5	3
WC	(Italy) F Gaio (Italy) A Motti	7^{7}	6^{5}	[10]
(Australia) R Junaid (South Africa) R Roelofse	6^{1}	7^{7}	[8]
4	(Sweden) J Brunström (Slovakia) I Zelenay	6	6
(Switzerland) L Margaroli (Netherlands) D Pel	1	2
(Poland) J Janowicz (Poland) G Panfil	6	7^{7}
(Italy) M Cecchinato (Italy) F Cipolla	4	6^{4}
(Portugal) P Sousa (Spain) D Vega Hernández	6	3	[6]
Alt	(United Kingdom) S Clayton (United Kingdom) J O'Mara	2	6	[10]
WC	(Italy) J Ocleppo (Italy) A Vavassori	6^{0}	6	[7]
3	(Uruguay) A Behar (United Kingdom) J Salisbury	7^{7}	4	[10]
WC	(Italy) F Baldi (Italy) A Pellegrino	4	6	[10]
(Croatia) M Draganja (Croatia) T Draganja	6	1	[8]
(Austria) M Neuchrist (Austria) T-S Weissborn	1	7^{8}	[6]
2	(Belarus) A Bury (Germany) K Krawietz	6	6^{6}	[10]

Quarterfinals
1	(Netherlands) S Arends (Croatia) A Šančić	7^{7}	6
WC	(Italy) F Gaio (Italy) A Motti	6^{5}	4
4	(Sweden) J Brunström (Slovakia) I Zelenay	4	6	[7]
(Poland) J Janowicz (Poland) G Panfil	6	3	[10]
Alt	(United Kingdom) S Clayton (United Kingdom) J O'Mara	6^{2}	2
3	(Uruguay) A Behar (United Kingdom) J Salisbury	7^{7}	6
WC	(Italy) F Baldi (Italy) A Pellegrino	1	3
2	(Belarus) A Bury (Germany) K Krawietz	6	6

Semifinals
1	(Netherlands) S Arends (Croatia) A Šančić	4	6	[13]
(Poland) J Janowicz (Poland) G Panfil	6	3	[11]
3	(Uruguay) A Behar (United Kingdom) J Salisbury	7^{7}	4	[0]
2	(Belarus) A Bury (Germany) K Krawietz	6^{5}	6	[10]

Final
1	(Netherlands) S Arends (Croatia) A Šančić	7^{7}	6
2	(Belarus) A Bury (Germany) K Krawietz	6^{1}	2
