= 2019 Città di Como Challenger – Singles =

Singles
- 2019 Città di Como Challenger

Final
- Champion: (Argentina) Facundo Mena
- Runner-up: (Slovakia) Andrej Martin
- Score: 2–6, 6–4, 6–1

Events
Singles	Doubles
- Città di Como Challenger

Salvatore Caruso was the defending champion but lost in the second round to Jan Choinski.

Facundo Mena won the title after defeating Andrej Martin 2–6, 6–4, 6–1 in the final.

== Seeds ==
All seeds receive a bye into the second round.

1. (Italy) Stefano Travaglia (semifinals)
2. (Italy) Salvatore Caruso (second round)
3. (Portugal) Pedro Sousa (quarterfinals)
4. (Slovenia) Blaž Rola (third round)
5. (Italy) Lorenzo Giustino (second round)
6. (Slovakia) Andrej Martin (final)
7. (Italy) Filippo Baldi (second round)
8. (Italy) Alessandro Giannessi (semifinals)
9. (Argentina) Facundo Bagnis (third round)
10. (Austria) Sebastian Ofner (third round)
11. (Spain) Tommy Robredo (second round)
12. (Australia) Christopher O'Connell (third round)
13. (Croatia) Viktor Galović (third round)
14. (Chile) Alejandro Tabilo (third round)
15. (Brazil) Thomaz Bellucci (second round)
16. (Russia) Aslan Karatsev (second round)

== Draw ==
Key

- Q = Qualifier
- WC = Wild card
- LL = Lucky loser
- Alt = Alternate
- ITF = ITF entry
- PR = Protected ranking
- SR = Special ranking
- SE = Special exempt
- JE = Junior exempt
- JR = Junior Accelerator Programme entrant
- CO = College Accelerator Programme entrant
- NG = Next Gen Accelerator Program entrant
- w/o = Walkover
- r = Retired
- d = Defaulted

=== Finals ===
Quarterfinals
1	(Italy) Stefano Travaglia	6	6
(Netherlands) Jelle Sels	4	4
PR	(Germany) Daniel Altmaier	6^{4}	3^{r}
6	(Slovakia) Andrej Martin	7^{7}	0
(Argentina) Facundo Mena	6	6
3	(Portugal) Pedro Sousa	2	0
8	(Italy) Alessandro Giannessi	7^{8}	4	6
(Kazakhstan) Dmitry Popko	6^{6}	6	4

Semifinals
1	(Italy) Stefano Travaglia	2	1
6	(Slovakia) Andrej Martin	6	6
(Argentina) Facundo Mena	6	1	6
8	(Italy) Alessandro Giannessi	2	6	2

Final
6	(Slovakia) Andrej Martin	6	4	1
(Argentina) Facundo Mena	2	6	6

=== Top half ===
==== Section 1 ====
First round
WC	(Italy) J Ocleppo	4	4
WC	(Italy) L Musetti	6	6
WC	(Italy) Federico Iannaccone	5	0
(Italy) R Brancaccio	7	6
(Netherlands) J Sels	6	4	6
(Germany) J Lenz	3	6	3
(France) S Doumbia	6	6
(Italy) A Arnaboldi	4	4

Second round
1	(Italy) S Travaglia	3	7	6
WC	(Italy) L Musetti	6	5	4
(Italy) R Brancaccio	1	5
13	(Croatia) V Galović	6	7
11	(Spain) T Robredo	7	5	3
(Netherlands) J Sels	5	7	6
(France) S Doumbia	3	7^{7}	6
7	(Italy) F Baldi	6	6^{2}	2

Third round
1	(Italy) S Travaglia	7^{7}	5	7^{7}
13	(Croatia) V Galović	6^{2}	7	6^{2}
(Netherlands) J Sels	6	7^{7}
(France) S Doumbia	1	6^{4}

Quarterfinals
1	(Italy) S Travaglia	6	6
(Netherlands) J Sels	4	4

==== Section 2 ====
First round
WC	(Italy) G Zeppieri	6	6
Q	(Uzbekistan) K Sultanov	2	0
(Argentina) F Cerúndolo	3	4
PR	(Germany) D Altmaier	6	6
(Italy) G Quinzi	7	6
(Sweden) M Eriksson	5	4
Alt	(Italy) R Bonadio	6	2	6
(France) A Müller	2	6	3

Second round
4	(Slovenia) B Rola	7	6
WC	(Italy) G Zeppieri	5	4
PR	(Germany) D Altmaier	1	7^{7}	6
16	(Russia) A Karatsev	6	6^{5}	3
12	(Australia) C O'Connell	6	6^{4}	1
(Italy) G Quinzi	0	7^{7}	1^{r}
Alt	(Italy) R Bonadio	4	4
6	(Slovakia) A Martin	6	6

Third round
4	(Slovenia) B Rola	6	3	4
PR	(Germany) D Altmaier	3	6	6
12	(Australia) C O'Connell	2	2
6	(Slovakia) A Martin	6	6

Quarterfinals
PR	(Germany) D Altmaier	6^{4}	3^{r}
6	(Slovakia) A Martin	7^{7}	0

=== Bottom half ===
==== Section 3 ====
First round
(Germany) P Torebko	7^{7}	3	1
(Argentina) F Mena	6^{4}	6	6
WC	(Italy) F Forti	2	3
(Italy) A Pellegrino	6	6
(Slovakia) A Molčan	7^{9}	6
(Switzerland) S Ehrat	6^{7}	4
LL	(France) F Reboul	6	3	6
(Spain) D Gimeno Traver	1	6	3

Second round
5	(Italy) L Giustino	3	2
(Argentina) F Mena	6	6
(Italy) A Pellegrino	3	6	2
9	(Argentina) F Bagnis	6	2	6
14	(Chile) A Tabilo	6	7^{8}
(Slovakia) A Molčan	4	6^{6}
LL	(France) F Reboul	2	2
3	(Portugal) P Sousa	6	6

Third round
(Argentina) F Mena	3	6	6
9	(Argentina) F Bagnis	6	3	1
14	(Chile) A Tabilo	7^{7}	4	0
3	(Portugal) P Sousa	6^{5}	6	6

Quarterfinals
(Argentina) F Mena	6	6
3	(Portugal) P Sousa	2	0

==== Section 4 ====
First round
(Switzerland) M-A Hüsler	6	5	3
(France) J Tatlot	2	7	6
(Italy) GM Moroni	0	1
Q	(Ecuador) G Escobar	6	6
(Kazakhstan) D Popko	6	6
(France) M Guinard	4	3
(Chile) MT Barrios Vera	2	3
(United Kingdom) J Choinski	6	6

Second round
8	(Italy) A Giannessi	1	6	6
(France) J Tatlot	6	4	3
Q	(Ecuador) G Escobar	3	6^{4}
10	(Austria) S Ofner	6	7^{7}
15	(Brazil) T Bellucci	3	3
(Kazakhstan) D Popko	6	6
(United Kingdom) J Choinski	7^{7}	6
2	(Italy) S Caruso	6^{2}	2

Third round
8	(Italy) A Giannessi	6	6
10	(Austria) S Ofner	4	2
(Kazakhstan) D Popko	2	6	6
(United Kingdom) J Choinski	6	2	1

Quarterfinals
8	(Italy) A Giannessi	7^{8}	4	6
(Kazakhstan) D Popko	6^{6}	6	4
