= 2010 Città di Como Challenger =

Italian professional tennis tournament

- Date: August 30 – September 5
- Edition: 5th
- Location: Como, Italy

Champions

Singles
- (Netherlands) Robin Haase

Doubles
- (Germany) Frank Moser / (Czech Republic) David Škoch
- Città di Como Challenger

The 2010 Città di Como Challenger was a professional tennis tournament played on outdoor clay courts. It was the fifth edition of the tournament which is part of the 2010 ATP Challenger Tour. It took place in Como, Italy between August 30 and September 5, 2010.

== ATP entrants ==
=== Seeds ===
Nationality	Player	Ranking*	Seeding
NED	Robin Haase	97	1
ITA	Filippo Volandri	101	2
ITA	Paolo Lorenzi	104	3
GER	Julian Reister	106	4
BEL	Steve Darcis	110	5
ESP	Albert Ramos-Viñolas	119	6
ROU	Adrian Ungur	122	7
POR	Rui Machado	126	8

- Rankings are as of August 23, 2010.

=== Other entrants ===
The following players received wildcards into the singles main draw:

- (Italy) Paolo Lorenzi
- (Austria) Thomas Muster
- (Italy) Matteo Trevisan
- (Italy) Filippo Volandri

The following players received entry as an alternate into the singles main draw:

- (Argentina) Juan-Martín Aranguren
- (Italy) Andrea Arnaboldi
- (Italy) Daniele Giorgini

The following players received entry as a Special Exempt into the singles main draw:

- (Italy) Alberto Brizzi
- (Belgium) David Goffin

The following players received entry from the qualifying draw:

- (Austria) Johannes Ager
- (Italy) Gianluca Naso
- (Germany) Cedrik-Marcel Stebe
- (Italy) Walter Trusendi

== Champions ==
=== Singles ===
(Netherlands) Robin Haase def. (Czech Republic) Ivo Minář, 6–4, 6–3

=== Doubles ===
(Germany) Frank Moser / (Czech Republic) David Škoch def. (Germany) Martin Emmrich / (Poland) Mateusz Kowalczyk, 5–7, 7–6(2), [10–5]
