= 2019 Città di Como Challenger =

- Date: 26 August – 1 September
- Edition: 14th
- Surface: Clay
- Location: Como, Italy

Champions

Singles
- (Argentina) Facundo Mena

Doubles
- (Germany) Andre Begemann / (Romania) Florin Mergea
- Città di Como Challenger

The 2019 Città di Como Challenger was a professional tennis tournament played on clay courts. It was the fourteenth edition of the tournament which was part of the 2019 ATP Challenger Tour. It took place in Como, Italy between 26 August and 1 September 2019.

== Singles main-draw entrants ==
=== Seeds ===
Country	Player	Rank^{1}	Seed
ITA	Stefano Travaglia	81	1
ITA	Salvatore Caruso	102	2
POR	Pedro Sousa	125	3
SLO	Blaž Rola	127	4
ITA	Lorenzo Giustino	128	5
SVK	Andrej Martin	137	6
ITA	Filippo Baldi	145	7
ITA	Alessandro Giannessi	149	8
ARG	Facundo Bagnis	165	9
AUT	Sebastian Ofner	168	10
ESP	Tommy Robredo	184	11
AUS	Christopher O'Connell	220	12
CRO	Viktor Galović	223	13
CHI	Alejandro Tabilo	236	14
BRA	Thomaz Bellucci	254	15
RUS	Aslan Karatsev	260	16

- ^{1} Rankings are as of 19 August 2019.

=== Other entrants ===
The following players received wildcards into the singles main draw:

- (Italy) Francesco Forti
- (Italy) Federico Iannaccone
- (Italy) Lorenzo Musetti
- (Italy) Julian Ocleppo
- (Italy) Giulio Zeppieri

The following player received entry into the singles main draw using a protected ranking:

- (Germany) Daniel Altmaier

The following players received entry into the singles main draw as alternates:

- (Italy) Riccardo Bonadio
- (Argentina) ~~Andrea Collarini~~

The following players received entry from the qualifying draw:

- (Ecuador) Gonzalo Escobar
- (Uzbekistan) Khumoyun Sultanov

The following player received entry as a lucky loser:

- (France) Fabien Reboul

== Champions ==
=== Singles ===
- (Argentina) Facundo Mena def. (Slovakia) Andrej Martin 2–6, 6–4, 6–1.

=== Doubles ===
- (Germany) Andre Begemann / (Romania) Florin Mergea def. (Brazil) Fabrício Neis / (Portugal) Pedro Sousa 5–7, 7–5, [14–12].
