= Facundo Argüello (tennis) =

Argentine tennis player

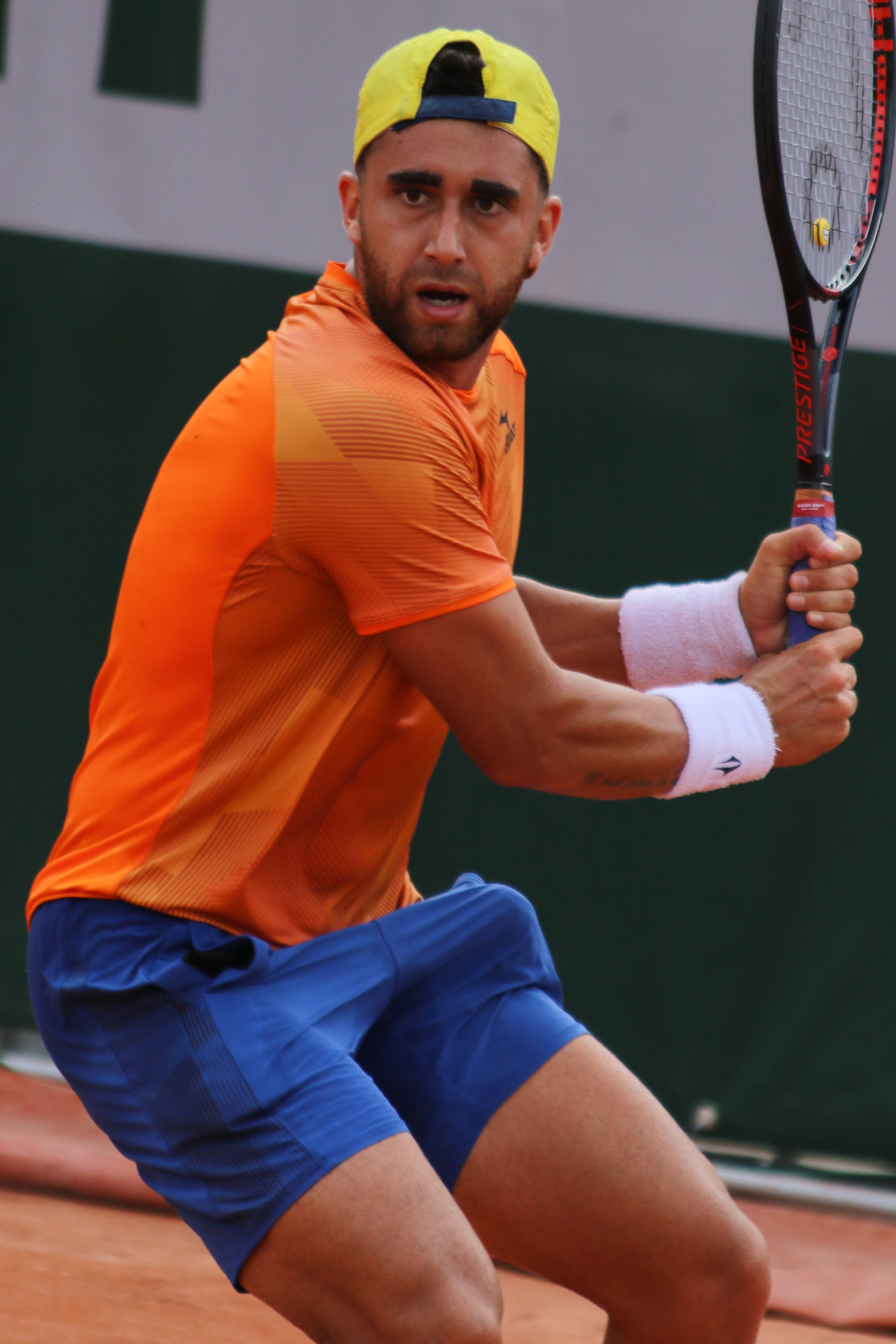
- Arguello at the 2019 French Open
- Country (sports): Argentina
- Residence: Córdoba, Argentina
- Born: 4 August 1992 (age 34) Córdoba, Argentina
- Height: 1.78 m (5 ft 10 in)
- Retired: 2020
- Plays: Right-handed (two-handed backhand)
- Coach: Javier Nalbandian
- Prize money: US $594,280

Singles
- Career record: 1–16 (ATP Tour level, Grand Slam level, and Davis Cup)
- Career titles: 0
- Highest ranking: No. 104 (14 April 2014)

Grand Slam singles results
- French Open: 1R (2014, 2015)
- Wimbledon: Q2 (2015)
- US Open: Q1 (2013, 2015)

Doubles
- Career record: 3–8 (ATP Tour level, Grand Slam level, and Davis Cup)
- Career titles: 0
- Highest ranking: No. 124 (1 August 2016)
Medal record
Representing Argentina
Men's tennis
South American Games
Gold medal – first place	2010 Medellín	Singles
Silver medal – second place	2010 Medellín	Doubles

Facundo Argüello (Spanish pronunciation: [faˈkundo aɾˈɣweʝo]; born 4 August 1992) is an Argentine former tennis player. He has a career-high ATP singles ranking of No. 104 achieved on 14 April 2014 and a doubles ranking of No. 124 achieved on 1 August 2016.

He played in an ATP 250 doubles event in 2011.

In 2013 he played the qualifying stages of the Roland Garros Open and US Open. In 2014 he won the Itajaí Challenger, beating Diego Schwartzman in the final match. He qualified directly to the 2014 Roland Garros Open, where he lost to world number 43 Radek Štěpánek after winning the first two sets. In the 2015 Roland Garros draw, he faced Andy Murray in the first round, Murray won in straight sets.

== Challenger and Futures finals ==
=== Singles: 31 (15–16) ===
Legend (singles) ATP Challenger Tour (4–9) ITF Futures Tour (11–7)	Titles by surface Hard (0–0) Clay (15–16) Grass (0–0) Carpet (0–0)

Result	W–L	Date	Tournament	Tier	Surface	Opponent	Score
Loss	0–1	Oct 2009	Chile F3, Santiago	Futures	Clay	(Peru) Iván Miranda	1–6, 1–6
Win	1–1	May 2010	Argentina F5, Buenos Aires	Futures	Clay	(Argentina) Patricio Heras	6–2, 6–1
Loss	1–2	Jul 2010	Argentina F14, Rafaela	Futures	Clay	(Argentina) Andrés Molteni	6–3, 6–7^{(0–7)}, 1–6
Win	2–2	Aug 2010	Argentina F15, Buenos Aires	Futures	Clay	(Argentina) Pablo Galdón	6–1, 6–4
Loss	2–3	Sep 2010	Belo Horizonte, Brazil	Challenger	Clay	(Brazil) Rogério Dutra Silva	4–6, 2–6
Win	3–3	Oct 2010	Argentina F21, San Juan	Futures	Clay	(Argentina) Diego Schwartzman	6–1, 6–1
Win	4–3	Apr 2011	Argentina F2, Villa María	Futures	Clay	(Argentina) Nicolás Pastor	6–2, 6–4
Win	5–3	Jun 2011	Argentina F8, Corrientes	Futures	Clay	(Peru) Duilio Beretta	3–6, 6–2, 7–6^{(7–4)}
Win	6–3	Jul 2011	Argentina F9, Resistencia	Futures	Clay	(Argentina) Guillermo Durán	6–4, 6–2
Loss	6–4	Jul 2011	Manta, Ecuador	Challenger	Clay	(Argentina) Brian Dabul	1–6, 3–6
Loss	6–5	Jun 2012	Argentina F11, San Francisco	Futures	Clay	(Argentina) Diego Schwartzman	3–6, 1–6
Loss	6–6	Jun 2012	Argentina F14, Corrientes	Futures	Clay	(Argentina) Diego Schwartzman	2–6, 5–7
Loss	6–7	Jul 2012	Lima, Peru	Challenger	Clay	(Argentina) Guido Andreozzi	3–6, 7–6^{(8–6)}, 2–6
Loss	6–8	Apr 2013	Savannah, USA	Challenger	Clay	(United States) Ryan Harrison	2–6, 3–6
Loss	6–9	Sep 2013	Cali, Colombia	Challenger	Clay	(Argentina) Facundo Bagnis	6–2, 4–6, 3–6
Win	7–9	Sep 2013	Porto Alegre, Brazil	Challenger	Clay	(Argentina) Máximo González	6–4, 6–1
Loss	7–10	Oct 2013	São Paulo, Brazil	Challenger	Clay	(Argentina) Guido Pella	1–6, 0–6
Loss	7–11	Oct 2013	Buenos Aires, Argentina	Challenger	Clay	(Uruguay) Pablo Cuevas	6–7^{(6–8)}, 6–2, 4–6
Win	8–11	Apr 2014	Itajaí, Brazil	Challenger	Clay	(Argentina) Diego Schwartzman	4–6, 6–0, 6–4
Win	9–11	May 2015	Tallahassee, USA	Challenger	Clay	(United States) Frances Tiafoe	2–6, 7–6^{(7–5)}, 6–4
Win	10–11	Sep 2015	Campinas, Brazil	Challenger	Clay	(Argentina) Diego Schwartzman	7–5, 6–3
Loss	10–12	Feb 2017	USA F7, Orlando	Futures	Clay	(Austria) Michael Linzer	3–6, 0–6
Win	11–12	Jun 2017	Argentina F3, Villa María	Futures	Clay	(Argentina) Juan Ignacio Galarza	6–2, 6–0
Win	12–12	Jul 2017	Colombia F2, Manizales	Futures	Clay	(Colombia) Daniel Elahi Galán	6–4, 5–7, 6–2
Win	13–12	Aug 2017	Colombia F3, Pereira	Futures	Clay	(Peru) Mauricio Echazú	6–3, 6–2
Loss	13–13	Aug 2017	Floridablanca, Colombia	Challenger	Clay	(Argentina) Guido Pella	2–6, 4–6
Loss	13–14	Sep 2017	Argentina F5, Neuquén	Futures	Clay	(Argentina) Hernán Casanova	6–3, 4–6, 1–6
Loss	13–15	Sep 2017	Argentina F6, Buenos Aires	Futures	Clay	(Brazil) Daniel Dutra da Silva	3–6, 6–7^{(4–7)}
Win	14–15	May 2018	Argentina F1, Villa del Dique	Futures	Clay	(Argentina) Camilo Ugo Carabelli	3–6, 6–4, 6–4
Win	15–15	Jun 2018	Argentina F3, Córdoba	Futures	Clay	(Argentina) Gonzalo Villanueva	6–4, 7–6^{(7–5)}
Loss	15–16	Jan 2019	Punta del Este, Uruguay	Challenger	Clay	(Brazil) Thiago Monteiro	6–3, 2–6, 3–6

=== Doubles: 32 (20–12) ===
Legend (doubles) ATP Challenger Tour (8–6) ITF Futures Tour (12–6)	Titles by surface Hard (0–0) Clay (20–12) Grass (0–0) Carpet (0–0)

Result	W–L	Date	Tournament	Tier	Surface	Partner	Opponents	Score
Win	1–0	Sep 2008	Argentina F9, Santa Fe	Futures	Clay	(Argentina) Agustín Picco	(Argentina) Marcos Conocente (Argentina) Gustavo Sterin	7–6^{(7–5)}, 6–1
Win	2–0	May 2009	Argentina F4, Villa del Dique	Futures	Clay	(Argentina) Agustín Picco	(Argentina) Federico Cavallero (Argentina) Marcos Conocente	3–6, 6–3, [10–5]
Loss	2–1	Sep 2009	Argentina F16, Salta	Futures	Clay	(Argentina) Agustín Picco	(Argentina) Alejandro Fabbri (Argentina) Leandro Migani	3–6, 6–3, [7–10]
Win	3–1	May 2010	Argentina F4, Buenos Aires	Futures	Clay	(Argentina) Agustín Velotti	(Argentina) Gastón-Arturo Grimolizzi (Chile) Rodrigo Pérez	6–1, 6–1
Loss	3–2	May 2010	Argentina F5, Buenos Aires	Futures	Clay	(Argentina) Agustín Velotti	(Argentina) Renzo Olivo (Argentina) Diego Schwartzman	6–2, 2–6, [8–10]
Loss	3–3	Jul 2010	Argentina F14, Rafaela	Futures	Clay	(Argentina) Federico Coria	(Argentina) Andrés Molteni (Argentina) Diego Schwartzman	3–6, 4–6
Loss	3–4	Aug 2010	Argentina F15, Buenos Aires	Futures	Clay	(Argentina) Franco Agamenone	(Argentina) Guillermo Bujniewicz (Argentina) Guillermo Durán	4–6, 2–6
Loss	3–5	Jul 2011	Como, Italy	Challenger	Clay	(Argentina) Martín Alund	(Argentina) Federico Delbonis (Argentina) Renzo Olivo	1–6, 4–6
Win	4–5	Jun 2012	Argentina F11, San Francisco	Futures	Clay	(Argentina) Diego Schwartzman	(Uruguay) Martín Cuevas (Argentina) José María Paniagua	6–2, 6–2
Win	5–5	Jun 2012	Argentina F12, Posadas	Futures	Clay	(Argentina) Franco Agamenone	(Brazil) Diego Matos (Argentina) Juan Vazquez-Valenzuela	6–2, 6–2
Win	6–5	Jul 2012	Lima, Peru	Challenger	Clay	(Argentina) Agustín Velotti	(Italy) Claudio Grassi (Italy) Luca Vanni	7–6^{(7–4)}, 7–6^{(7–5)}
Loss	6–6	Oct 2012	Buenos Aires, Argentina	Challenger	Clay	(Argentina) Agustín Velotti	(Argentina) Martín Alund (Argentina) Horacio Zeballos	6–7^{(6–8)}, 2–6
Win	7–6	Jun 2014	Košice, Slovakia	Challenger	Clay	(Uruguay) Ariel Behar	(Poland) Andriej Kapaś (Poland) Błażej Koniusz	6–4, 7–6^{(7–4)}
Win	8–6	Aug 2014	Como, Italy	Challenger	Clay	(Argentina) Guido Andreozzi	(Canada) Steven Diez (Spain) Enrique López Pérez	6–2, 6–2
Win	9–6	Apr 2015	Sarasota, USA	Challenger	Clay	(Argentina) Facundo Bagnis	(South Korea) Chung Hyeon (India) Divij Sharan	3–6, 6–2, [13–11]
Win	10–6	Apr 2016	Sarasota, USA	Challenger	Clay	(Argentina) Nicolás Kicker	(El Salvador) Marcelo Arévalo (Peru) Sergio Galdós	4–6, 6–4, [10–6]
Win	11–6	Jun 2016	Fürth, Germany	Challenger	Clay	(Venezuela) Roberto Maytín	(Slovakia) Andrej Martin (Austria) Tristan-Samuel Weissborn	6–3, 6–4
Win	12–6	Jun 2016	Moscow, Russia	Challenger	Clay	(Venezuela) Roberto Maytín	(Georgia (country)) Aleksandre Metreveli (Kazakhstan) Dmitry Popko	6–2, 7–5
Loss	12–7	Jul 2016	San Benedetto, Italy	Challenger	Clay	(Peru) Sergio Galdós	(Italy) Federico Gaio (Italy) Stefano Napolitano	3–6, 4–6
Loss	12–8	Jul 2016	Prague, Czech Republic	Challenger	Clay	(Chile) Julio Peralta	(Austria) Julian Knowle (Slovakia) Igor Zelenay	4–6, 5–7
Win	13–8	Jan 2017	USA F5, Weston	Futures	Clay	(Argentina) Juan Ignacio Londero	(Ecuador) Gonzalo Escobar (Venezuela) Luis David Martínez	6–4, 6–7^{(1–7)}, [14–12]
Win	14–8	Feb 2017	USA F6, Palm Coast	Futures	Clay	(Argentina) Juan Ignacio Londero	(Republic of Ireland) Julian Bradley (United States) Isaiah Strode	6–2, 6–3
Win	15–8	Jun 2017	Argentina F1, Villa del Dique	Futures	Clay	(Argentina) Tomás Lipovšek Puches	(Argentina) Hernán Casanova (Argentina) Juan Ignacio Galarza	6–0, 6–1
Win	16–8	Jun 2017	Argentina F2, Córdoba	Futures	Clay	(Argentina) Tomás Lipovšek Puches	(Brazil) André Miele (Brazil) Nicolas Santos	6–2, 6–2
Win	17–8	Jun 2017	Argentina F3, Villa María	Futures	Clay	(Argentina) Tomás Lipovšek Puches	(Brazil) Igor Marcondes (Brazil) Rafael Matos	1–6, 6–1, [10–8]
Loss	17–9	Jul 2017	Colombia F2, Manizales	Futures	Clay	(Argentina) Gonzalo Villanueva	(Argentina) Facundo Mena (Argentina) Camilo Ugo Carabelli	3–6, 6–1, [4–10]
Win	18–9	Sep 2017	Argentina F6, Buenos Aires	Futures	Clay	(Argentina) Maximiliano Estévez	(Brazil) Daniel Dutra da Silva (Brazil) José Pereira	7–5, 6–1
Win	19–9	Nov 2017	Santiago, Chile	Challenger	Clay	(Argentina) Franco Agamenone	(Argentina) Máximo González (Chile) Nicolás Jarry	6–4, 3–6, [10–6]
Loss	19–10	May 2018	Argentina F1, Villa del Dique	Futures	Clay	(Argentina) Matías Zukas	(Chile) Juan Carlos Sáez (Argentina) Eduardo Agustín Torre	3–6, 6–1, [7–10]
Win	20–10	May 2018	Argentina F2, Villa María	Futures	Clay	(Argentina) Matías Zukas	(Chile) Juan Carlos Sáez (Argentina) Eduardo Agustín Torre	6–2, 6–2
Loss	20–11	Mar 2019	Santiago, Chile	Challenger	Clay	(Uruguay) Martín Cuevas	(Argentina) Franco Agamenone (Brazil) Fernando Romboli	6–7^{(5–7)}, 6–1, [6–10]
Loss	20–12	Apr 2019	Tunis, Tunisia	Challenger	Clay	(Argentina) Guillermo Durán	(Belgium) Ruben Bemelmans (Germany) Tim Pütz	3–6, 1–6
