= Marco Crugnola =

Italian professional tennis player

- Country (sports): Italy
- Residence: Varese, Italy
- Born: 24 May 1983 (age 42) Varese, Italy
- Height: 1.88 m (6 ft 2 in)
- Turned pro: 2004
- Plays: Right-handed (one-handed backhand)
- Prize money: $210,793

Singles
- Career record: 0–3
- Career titles: 0
- Highest ranking: No. 165 (6 July 2009)
- Current ranking: No. 232 (14 February 2011)

Grand Slam singles results
- Australian Open: 1R (2011)
- French Open: Q1 (2007, 2009, 2011)
- Wimbledon: Q3 (2007, 2009, 2011)
- US Open: Q1 (2007, 2009)

Doubles
- Career record: 0–1
- Career titles: 0
- Highest ranking: No. 118 (6 April 2009)
- Last updated on: January 17, 2011.

Marco Crugnola (Italian pronunciation: [ˈmarko kruɲˈɲɔːla]; born 24 May 1983) is an Italian professional tennis player.

== Challenger finals ==
=== Singles: 2 (0-2) ===
Legend (pre/post 2009)
ATP Challenger Series /
ATP Challenger Tour (0–2)

Result	No.	Date	Tournament	Surface	Opponent	Score
Loss	1.	17 August 2008	Vigo, Spain	Clay	(Spain) Pablo Andújar	1–6, 6–3, 3–6
Loss	2.	29 August 2010	Manerbio, Italy	Clay	(Netherlands) Robin Haase	3–6, 2–6

=== Doubles: 12 (6-6) ===
Legend (pre/post 2009)
ATP Challenger Series /
ATP Challenger Tour (6-6)
