= Città di Como Challenger =

- 2025 Città di Como Challenger

ATP Challenger Tour
- Event name: Como Lake Challenger (2025)
- Location: Como, Italy
- Venue: Tennis Como
- Category: ATP Challenger Tour
- Surface: Clay / Outdoors
- Draw: 32S/24Q/16D
- Website: Website

The Como Lake Challenger is a tennis tournament held in Como, Italy since 2006. The event is part of the ATP Challenger Tour and is played on outdoor clay courts.

== Past finals ==
=== Singles ===
Year	Champion	Runner-up	Score
2026	(Croatia) Matej Dodig	(Peru) Juan Pablo Varillas	6–3, 7–6^{(7–5)}
2025	(Croatia) Luka Mikrut	(Croatia) Duje Ajduković	6–3, 7–5
2024	(France) Gabriel Debru	(Peru) Ignacio Buse	6–1, 2–6, 6–3
2023	(Brazil) Thiago Seyboth Wild	(Spain) Pedro Martínez	5–7, 6–2, 6–3
2022	(Germany) Cedrik-Marcel Stebe	(Italy) Francesco Passaro	7–6^{(7–2)}, 6–4
2021	(Argentina) Juan Manuel Cerúndolo	(Italy) Gian Marco Moroni	7–5, 7–6^{(9–7)}
2020	Not Held		
2019	(Argentina) Facundo Mena	(Slovakia) Andrej Martin	2–6, 6–4, 6–1
2018	(Italy) Salvatore Caruso	(Chile) Christian Garín	7–5, 6–4
2017	(Portugal) Pedro Sousa	(Italy) Marco Cecchinato	1–6, 6–2, 6–4
2016	(France) Kenny de Schepper	(Italy) Marco Cecchinato	2–6, 7–6^{(7–0)}, 7–5
2015	(Russia) Andrey Kuznetsov	(Germany) Daniel Brands	6–4, 6–3
2014	(Serbia) Viktor Troicki	(Republic of Ireland) Louk Sorensen	6–3, 6–2
2013	(Spain) Pablo Carreño Busta	(Austria) Dominic Thiem	6–2, 5–7, 6–0
2012	(Austria) Andreas Haider-Maurer	(Portugal) João Sousa	6–3, 6–4
2011	(Spain) Pablo Carreño Busta	(Germany) Andreas Beck	6–4, 7–6^{(7–4)}
2010	(Netherlands) Robin Haase	(Czech Republic) Ivo Minář	6–4, 6–3
2009	(Ukraine) Oleksandr Dolgopolov Jr	(Argentina) Juan-Martín Aranguren	7–5, 7–6^{(7–5)}
2008	(Argentina) Diego Junqueira	(Austria) Daniel Köllerer	2–0, Ret.
2007	(Argentina) Máximo González	(Belgium) Christophe Rochus	7–6, 6–4
2006	(Italy) Simone Bolelli	(Italy) Federico Luzzi	4–6, 6–3, 6–2

=== Doubles ===
Year	Champion	Runner-up	Score
2026	(Croatia) Admir Kalender (Croatia) Nino Serdarušić	(Poland) Karol Drzewiecki (Poland) Piotr Matuszewski	6–3, 6–4
2025	(Romania) Victor Vlad Cornea (Argentina) Santiago Rodríguez Taverna	(Israel) Daniel Cukierman (Denmark) Johannes Ingildsen	6–3, 6–2
2024	(Romania) Victor Vlad Cornea (Ukraine) Denys Molchanov	(Romania) Alexandru Jecan; Ivan Liutarevich	6–2, 6–3
2023	(Germany) Constantin Frantzen (Germany) Hendrik Jebens	(Sweden) Filip Bergevi (Netherlands) Mick Veldheer	6–3, 6–4
2022	(Austria) Alexander Erler (Austria) Lucas Miedler	(Jamaica) Dustin Brown (Germany) Julian Lenz	6–1, 7–6^{(7–3)}
2021	(Brazil) Rafael Matos (Brazil) Felipe Meligeni Alves	(Venezuela) Luis David Martínez (Italy) Andrea Vavassori	6–7^{(2–7)}, 6–4, [10–6]
2020	Not Held		
2019	(Germany) Andre Begemann (Romania) Florin Mergea	(Brazil) Fabrício Neis (Portugal) Pedro Sousa	5–7, 7–5, [14–12]
2018	(Germany) Andre Begemann (Germany) Dustin Brown	(Slovakia) Martin Kližan (Slovakia) Filip Polášek	3–6, 6–4, [10–5]
2017	(Netherlands) Sander Arends (Croatia) Antonio Šančić	(Belarus) Aliaksandr Bury (Germany) Kevin Krawietz	7–6^{(7–1)}, 6–2
2016	(Czech Republic) Roman Jebavý (Slovakia) Andrej Martin	(Germany) Nils Langer (Austria) Gerald Melzer	3–6, 6–1, [10–5]
2015	(Germany) Gero Kretschmer (Germany) Alexander Satschko	(France) Kenny de Schepper (France) Maxime Teixeira	7–6^{(7–3)}, 6–4
2014	(Argentina) Guido Andreozzi (Argentina) Facundo Argüello	(Canada) Steven Diez (Spain) Enrique López-Pérez	6–2, 6–2
2013	(Australia) Rameez Junaid (Slovakia) Igor Zelenay	(Italy) Marco Crugnola (Italy) Stefano Ianni	7–5, 7–6^{(7–2)}
2012	(Germany) Philipp Marx (Romania) Florin Mergea	(Australia) Colin Ebelthite (Czech Republic) Jaroslav Pospíšil	6–4, 4–6, [10–4]
2011	(Argentina) Federico Delbonis (Argentina) Renzo Olivo	(Argentina) Martín Alund (Argentina) Facundo Argüello	6–1, 6–4
2010	(Germany) Frank Moser (Czech Republic) David Škoch	(Germany) Martin Emmrich (Poland) Mateusz Kowalczyk	5–7, 7–6^{(7–2)}, [10–5]
2009	(Italy) Marco Crugnola (Italy) Alessandro Motti	(Philippines) Treat Conrad Huey (India) Harsh Mankad	7–6^{(7–3)}, 6–3
2008	(Argentina) Mariano Hood (Spain) Alberto Martín	(Chile) Guillermo Hormazábal (Croatia) Antonio Veić	6–1, 6–4
2007	(Argentina) Máximo González (Italy) Simone Vagnozzi	(Italy) Flavio Cipolla (Italy) Marco Pedrini	7–6, 6–4
2006	(United Kingdom) Jamie Delgado (United Kingdom) Jamie Murray	(Romania) Victor Crivoi (Romania) Gabriel Moraru	6–2, 4–6, [10–7]
