= 2009 Sporting Challenger – Singles =

2009 sports event

Singles
- 2009 Sporting Challenger

Final
- Champion: (Italy) Potito Starace
- Runner-up: (Argentina) Máximo González
- Score: 7–6(4), 6–3

Events
Singles	Doubles
← 2008 ·	Sporting Challenger	· 2010 →

Fabio Fognini was the defender of title; however, he chose to not participate this year.
Potito Starace defeated Máximo González 7–6(4), 6–3 in the final.

== Seeds ==
1. (Argentina) Máximo González (final)
2. (Italy) Potito Starace (champion)
3. (Portugal) Frederico Gil (first round)
4. (Argentina) Diego Junqueira (first round)
5. (United States) Kevin Kim (first round)
6. (Austria) Daniel Köllerer (first round)
7. (Brazil) Marcos Daniel (first round)
8. (Germany) Simon Greul (semifinals)

== Draw ==
=== Key ===
- Q = Qualifier
- WC = Wild card
- LL = Lucky loser
- Alt = Alternate
- ITF = ITF entry
- PR = Protected ranking
- SR = Special ranking
- SE = Special exempt
- JE = Junior exempt
- JR = Junior Accelerator Programme entrant
- CO = College Accelerator Programme entrant
- NG = Next Gen Accelerator Program entrant
- w/o = Walkover
- r = Retired
- d = Defaulted

=== Final four ===
Semifinals
1	(Argentina) Máximo González	6	6
8	(Germany) Simon Greul	2	4
(Czech Republic) Jiří Vaněk	3	6	4
2	(Italy) Potito Starace	6	0	6

Final
1	(Argentina) Máximo González	6^{4}	3
2	(Italy) Potito Starace	7	6

=== Top half ===
First round
1	(Argentina) M González	6	7
(Spain) P Riba	4	5
(Portugal) R Machado	7	6
(Netherlands) J Huta Galung	5	3
LL	(Australia) J Sirianni	4	7	4
WC	(Italy) T Fabbiano	6	6^{5}	6
Q	(Argentina) C Villagrán	7	6
5	(United States) K Kim	5	4
4	(Argentina) D Junqueira	7	4	4
WC	(Italy) A Arnaboldi	5	6	6
(Italy) T Tenconi	4	2
(Colombia) S Giraldo	6	6
WC	(Italy) M Trevisan	3	6	6
(France) L Recouderc	6	3	4
(United States) W Odesnik	4	2
8	(Germany) S Greul	6	6

Second round
1	(Argentina) M González	6	3	6
(Portugal) R Machado	3	6	2
WC	(Italy) T Fabbiano	6	6
Q	(Argentina) C Villagrán	3	4
WC	(Italy) A Arnaboldi	4	1
(Colombia) S Giraldo	6	6
WC	(Italy) M Trevisan	6	2	5
8	(Germany) S Greul	3	6	7

Quarterfinals
1	(Argentina) M González	6	6
WC	(Italy) T Fabbiano	3	2
(Colombia) S Giraldo	6	3	1
8	(Germany) S Greul	2	6	6

Semifinals
1	(Argentina) M González	6	6
8	(Germany) S Greul	2	4

=== Bottom half ===
First round
7	(Brazil) M Daniel	4	4
(Czech Republic) J Vaněk	6	6
(France) É Roger-Vasselin	3	6^{4}
Q	(Argentina) M Zabaleta	6	7
(Sweden) A Vinciguerra	6	7
Q	(Spain) S Gutiérrez-Ferrol	3	5
(Serbia) I Bozoljac	7	7
3	(Portugal) F Gil	6^{5}	5
6	(Austria) D Köllerer	1	0
(Germany) D Gremelmayr	6	6
WC	(Italy) A di Mauro	4	3
(Brazil) T Alves	6	6
(Brazil) T Bellucci	3	6	4
(Italy) M Crugnola	6	2	6
(Spain) A Menéndez-Maceiras	4	2
2	(Italy) P Starace	6	6

Second round
(Czech Republic) J Vaněk	7	6
Q	(Argentina) M Zabaleta	5	4
(Sweden) A Vinciguerra	6	6
(Serbia) I Bozoljac	2	3
(Germany) D Gremelmayr	6	6^{5}	4
(Brazil) T Alves	4	7	6
(Italy) M Crugnola	4	0
2	(Italy) P Starace	6	6

Quarterfinals
(Czech Republic) J Vaněk	6	7
(Sweden) A Vinciguerra	4	6^{2}
(Brazil) T Alves	3	2
2	(Italy) P Starace	6	6

Semifinals
(Czech Republic) J Vaněk	3	6	4
2	(Italy) P Starace	6	0	6
