= 2009 Trani Cup – Singles =

Singles
- 2009 Trani Cup

Final
- Champion: (Austria) Daniel Köllerer
- Runner-up: (Italy) Filippo Volandri
- Score: 6–3, 7–5

Events
Singles	Doubles
← 2008 ·	Trani Cup	· 2010 →

Daniel Köllerer won this tournament, after defeating Filippo Volandri 6–3, 7–5.

== Seeds ==
1. (Belgium) Christophe Rochus (second round)
2. (Germany) Simon Greul (semifinals)
3. (Austria) Daniel Köllerer (champion)
4. (Italy) Flavio Cipolla (first round)
5. (Argentina) Sebastián Decoud (first round)
6. (Argentina) ~~Brian Dabul~~ (withdrew)
7. (Spain) Pere Riba (first round)
8. (Italy) Tomas Tenconi (first round)

== Draw ==
=== Key ===
- Q = Qualifier
- WC = Wild card
- LL = Lucky loser
- Alt = Alternate
- SE = Special exempt
- PR = Protected ranking
- ITF = ITF entry
- JE = Junior exempt
- w/o = Walkover
- r = Retired
- d = Defaulted
- SR = Special ranking

=== Final four ===
Semifinals
WC	(Italy) Filippo Volandri	6	6
WC	(Italy) Daniele Bracciali	4	4
3	(Austria) Daniel Köllerer	4	7	6
2	(Germany) Simon Greul	6	5	3

Final
WC	(Italy) Filippo Volandri	3	5
3	(Austria) Daniel Köllerer	6	7

=== Top half ===
First round
1	(Belgium) C Rochus	6	6
Q	(Italy) F Aldi	4	1
(Germany) A Flock	2	1
WC	(Italy) F Volandri	6	6
Q	(Italy) S Ianni	6	1	2
(Italy) E Burzi	3	6	6
(Netherlands) M Middelkoop	6	7
5	(Argentina) S Decoud	4	6^{4}
4/WC	(Italy) F Cipolla	4	6	1
(Spain) M López	6	2	6
Q	(Italy) M Trevisan	0	r
WC	(Italy) D Bracciali	6
(Italy) S Vagnozzi	6	0	6
(Croatia) A Veić	3	6	1
(Italy) A Brizzi	6	7
7	(Spain) P Riba	4	5

Second round
1	(Belgium) C Rochus	1	2
WC	(Italy) F Volandri	6	6
(Italy) E Burzi	6	6
(Netherlands) M Middelkoop	4	3
(Spain) M López	6	2	r
WC	(Italy) D Bracciali	4	1
(Italy) S Vagnozzi	1	6	6
(Italy) A Brizzi	6	3	4

Quarterfinals
WC	(Italy) F Volandri	6	6
(Italy) E Burzi	3	2
WC	(Italy) D Bracciali	7	6
(Italy) S Vagnozzi	6^{3}	0

Semifinals
WC	(Italy) F Volandri	6	6
WC	(Italy) D Bracciali	4	4

=== Bottom half ===
First round
8	(Italy) Tomas Tenconi	3	4
(Italy) A di Mauro	6	6
(Argentina) L Migani	6	3	2
Q	(Italy) M Crugnola	1	6	6
(Sweden) A Vinciguerra	1	7	1
WC	(Argentina) C Berlocq	6	6^{9}	6
(Romania) P-A Luncanu	2	2
3	(Austria) D Köllerer	6	6
LL	(Germany) S Rieschick	4	6	6
(Italy) G Naso	6	2	4
(Czech Republic) D Lojda	3	6^{4}
(Peru) L Horna	6	7
(Sweden) F Prpic	7	6
(Netherlands) M Koning	6^{6}	0
(Italy) G Petrazzuolo	4	7	0
2	(Germany) S Greul	6	5	6

Second round
(Italy) A di Mauro	3	4
Q	(Italy) M Crugnola	6	6
WC	(Argentina) C Berlocq	0	1
3	(Austria) D Köllerer	6	6
LL	(Germany) S Rieschick	6^{4}	3
(Peru) L Horna	7	6
(Sweden) F Prpic	4	4
2	(Germany) S Greul	6	6

Quarterfinals
Q	(Italy) M Crugnola	5	3
3	(Austria) D Köllerer	7	6
(Peru) L Horna	3	2
2	(Germany) S Greul	6	6

Semifinals
3	(Austria) D Köllerer	4	7	6
2	(Germany) S Greul	6	5	3
