= 2011 Sporting Challenger – Singles =

Singles
- 2011 Sporting Challenger

Final
- Champion: (Argentina) Carlos Berlocq
- Runner-up: (Spain) Albert Ramos
- Score: 6–4, 6–3

Events
Singles	Doubles
← 2010 ·	Sporting Challenger	· 2012 →

Simone Bolelli was the champion in 2010, but chose not to defend his title.

Carlos Berlocq defeated Albert Ramos 6–4, 6–3 in the final and claimed the title.

== Seeds ==
1. (Spain) Daniel Gimeno-Traver (second round)
2. (Argentina) Carlos Berlocq (champion)
3. (Italy) Filippo Volandri (second round)
4. (Spain) Albert Ramos (final)
5. (Argentina) Diego Junqueira (quarterfinals)
6. (Italy) Flavio Cipolla (second round)
7. (France) Marc Gicquel (first round)
8. (Spain) Rubén Ramírez Hidalgo (semifinals)

== Draw ==
=== Key ===
- Q = Qualifier
- WC = Wild card
- LL = Lucky loser
- Alt = Alternate
- ITF = ITF entry
- PR = Protected ranking
- SR = Special ranking
- SE = Special exempt
- JE = Junior exempt
- JR = Junior Accelerator Programme entrant
- CO = College Accelerator Programme entrant
- NG = Next Gen Accelerator Program entrant
- w/o = Walkover
- r = Retired
- d = Defaulted

=== Finals ===
Semifinals
WC	(Italy) Alessandro Giannessi	1	3
4	(Spain) Albert Ramos	6	6
8	(Spain) Rubén Ramírez Hidalgo	6	4	6^{6}
2	(Argentina) Carlos Berlocq	3	6	7

Final
4	(Spain) Albert Ramos	4	3
2	(Argentina) Carlos Berlocq	6	6

=== Top half ===
First round
1	(Spain) D Gimeno-Traver	6	6
(Austria) M Fischer	1	4
WC	(Italy) A Giannessi	6	7
(Russia) K Kravchuk	3	5
(Brazil) J Silva	7	0	7
Q	(Italy) A Brizzi	5	6	6^{1}
Q	(Serbia) D Lajović	7	2	2
6	(Italy) F Cipolla	6^{2}	6	6
4	(Spain) A Ramos	6	6
(Italy) A di Mauro	1	2
Q	(Italy) M Crugnola	5	2
(Italy) S Vagnozzi	7	6
(Spain) D Muñoz-De La Nava	6	6
(Serbia) N Ćirić	1	4
Q	(Italy) S Galvani	7	3	6
7	(France) M Gicquel	6^{1}	6	1

Second round
1	(Spain) D Gimeno-Traver	4	1
WC	(Italy) A Giannessi	6	6
(Brazil) J Silva	7	6
6	(Italy) F Cipolla	5	1
4	(Spain) A Ramos	6	6
(Italy) S Vagnozzi	4	4
(Spain) D Muñoz-De La Nava	6	6
Q	(Italy) S Galvani	2	3

Quarterfinals
WC	(Italy) A Giannessi	6	6
(Brazil) J Silva	4	4
4	(Spain) A Ramos	6	6
(Spain) D Muñoz-De La Nava	2	0

Semifinals
WC	(Italy) A Giannessi	1	3
4	(Spain) A Ramos	6	6

=== Bottom half ===
First round
8	(Spain) R Ramírez Hidalgo	6	4	6
WC	(Italy) Andrea Arnaboldi	3	6	1
(France) D Guez	4	1
WC	(Italy) Stefano Travaglia	6	6
(Slovakia) M Kližan	7	6
(Switzerland) S Bohli	5	2
(Poland) J Janowicz	3	4
3	(Italy) F Volandri	6	6
5	(Argentina) D Junqueira	6	6
WC	(Italy) M Trevisan	2	2
(Belarus) U Ignatik	6	7
(France) F Serra	4	6^{3}
(Slovakia) A Martin	1	6^{7}
(Romania) A Ungur	6	7
(Ecuador) G Lapentti	0	2
2	(Argentina) C Berlocq	6	6

Second round
8	(Spain) R Ramírez Hidalgo	6	6
WC	(Italy) Stefano Travaglia	2	3
(Slovakia) M Kližan	2	6	6
3	(Italy) F Volandri	6	3	1
5	(Argentina) D Junqueira	6^{4}	6	6
(Belarus) U Ignatik	7	4	3
(Romania) A Ungur	6	3	4
2	(Argentina) C Berlocq	2	6	6

Quarterfinals
8	(Spain) R Ramírez Hidalgo	6	6
(Slovakia) M Kližan	1	3
5	(Argentina) D Junqueira	3	1
2	(Argentina) C Berlocq	6	6

Semifinals
8	(Spain) R Ramírez Hidalgo	6	4	6^{6}
2	(Argentina) C Berlocq	3	6	7
