= 2009 Trani Cup – Doubles =

Doubles
- 2009 Trani Cup

Final
- Champions: (United Kingdom) Jamie Delgado (United Kingdom) Jamie Murray
- Runners-up: (Germany) Simon Greul (Italy) Alessandro Motti
- Score: 3–6, 6–4, [12–10]

Events
Singles	Doubles
← 2008 ·	Trani Cup	· 2010 →

Jamie Delgado and Jamie Murray defeated Simon Greul and Alessandro Motti 3–6, 6–4, [12–10] in the final.

== Seeds ==
1. (India) Rohan Bopanna / (Germany) Frank Moser (quarterfinals)
2. (Thailand) Sanchai Ratiwatana / (Thailand) Sonchat Ratiwatana (quarterfinals)
3. (Austria) Daniel Köllerer / (Czech Republic) Jaroslav Levinský (semifinals)
4. (Switzerland) Yves Allegro / (Italy) Daniele Bracciali (quarterfinals)

== Draw ==
=== Key ===
- Q = Qualifier
- WC = Wild card
- LL = Lucky loser
- Alt = Alternate
- SE = Special exempt
- PR = Protected ranking
- ITF = ITF entry
- JE = Junior exempt
- w/o = Walkover
- r = Retired
- d = Defaulted
- SR = Special ranking

=== Draw ===
First round
1	(India) R Bopanna (Germany) F Moser	6	6
WC	(Argentina) C Berlocq (Argentina) N Todero	3	4
WC	(Italy) T Fabbiano (Italy) M Trevisan	5	r
(United Kingdom) J Delgado (United Kingdom) J Murray	5
3	(Austria) D Köllerer (Czech Republic) J Levinský	6	3	[10]
(Italy) A di Mauro (Italy) T Tenconi	1	6	[8]
(Italy) A Brizzi (Italy) G Petrazzuolo	3	6	[8]
WC	(Italy) S Ianni (Italy) S Vagnozzi	6	4	[10]
ALT	(Spain) P Martín-Adalia (Chile) H Podlipnik-Castillo	3	1
(Spain) M López (Spain) P Riba	6	6
(Germany) A Flock (Germany) S Rieschick	6	3	[4]
4	(Switzerland) Y Allegro (Italy) D Bracciali	2	6	[10]
(Germany) S Greul (Italy) A Motti	6	6
(Czech Republic) D Lojda (Croatia) A Veić	4	2
(Peru) L Horna (Sweden) F Prpic	w/o
2	(Thailand) Sa Ratiwatana (Thailand) So Ratiwatana

Quarterfinals
1	(India) R Bopanna (Germany) F Moser	1	4
(United Kingdom) J Delgado (United Kingdom) J Murray	6	6
3	(Austria) D Köllerer (Czech Republic) J Levinský	6	6
WC	(Italy) S Ianni (Italy) S Vagnozzi	0	3
(Spain) M López (Spain) P Riba	6	6
4	(Switzerland) Y Allegro (Italy) D Bracciali	3	4
(Germany) S Greul (Italy) A Motti	6	6
2	(Thailand) Sa Ratiwatana (Thailand) So Ratiwatana	0	4

Semifinals
(United Kingdom) J Delgado (United Kingdom) J Murray	6	6
3	(Austria) D Köllerer (Czech Republic) J Levinský	1	1
(Spain) M López (Spain) P Riba	5	0
(Germany) S Greul (Italy) A Motti	7	6

Finals
(United Kingdom) J Delgado (United Kingdom) J Murray	3	6	[12]
(Germany) S Greul (Italy) A Motti	6	4	[10]
