= 2009 Sporting Challenger – Doubles =

Doubles
- 2009 Sporting Challenger

Final
- Champions: (Italy) Daniele Bracciali (Italy) Potito Starace
- Runners-up: (Colombia) Santiago Giraldo (Spain) Pere Riba
- Score: 6–3, 6–4

Events
Singles	Doubles
← 2008 ·	Sporting Challenger	· 2010 →

Carlos Berlocq and Frederico Gil were the defending champions. Berlocq didn't start this year.
Gil partnered up with Rui Machado, but they lost to Bracciali/Starace in the semifinal.
Daniele Bracciali and Potito Starace defeated Santiago Giraldo and Pere Riba in the final 6–3, 6–4.

== Seeds ==
1. ( (Italy) Andrea Arnaboldi / (Italy) Adriano Biasella) (as an Alternate, First round)
2. (Germany) Denis Gremelmayr / (Germany) Philipp Marx (quarterfinals)
3. (Italy) Leonardo Azzaro / (Italy) Marco Crugnola (first round)
4. (Italy) Daniele Bracciali / (Italy) Potito Starace (champions)

== Draw ==
=== Key ===
- Q = Qualifier
- WC = Wild card
- LL = Lucky loser
- Alt = Alternate
- SE = Special exempt
- PR = Protected ranking
- ITF = ITF entry
- JE = Junior exempt
- w/o = Walkover
- r = Retired
- d = Defaulted
- SR = Special ranking

=== Draw ===
First round
1/ALT	(Italy) Andrea Arnaboldi (Italy) Adriano Biasella	1	1
(Italy) A di Mauro (Italy) U Vico	6	6
(Austria) D Köllerer (United States) W Odesnik	w/o
WC	(Italy) T Fabbiano (Italy) M Trevisan
3	(Italy) L Azzaro (Italy) M Crugnola	6	6
(Brazil) T Alves (Brazil) T Bellucci	4	3
(Colombia) S Giraldo (Spain) P Riba	6	6
WC	(Italy) Fabio Cerone (Italy) Marco Sattanino	3	2
WC	(Italy) Alberto Giraudo (Italy) F Piccari	4	4
(Germany) S Greul (Italy) A Motti	6	6
(Netherlands) J Huta Galung (France) É Roger-Vasselin	4	7	[3]
4	(Italy) D Bracciali (Italy) P Starace	6	6^{7}	[10]
(Serbia) I Bozoljac (United States) K Kim	2	5
(Portugal) F Gil (Portugal) R Machado	6	7
(Brazil) M Daniel (Argentina) D Junqueira	1	6^{4}
2	(Germany) D Gremelmayr (Germany) P Marx	6	7

Quarterfinals
(Italy) A di Mauro (Italy) U Vico	6	6
WC	(Italy) T Fabbiano (Italy) M Trevisan	1	0
3	(Italy) L Azzaro (Italy) M Crugnola	3	4
(Colombia) S Giraldo (Spain) P Riba	6	6
(Germany) S Greul (Italy) A Motti	5	1
4	(Italy) D Bracciali (Italy) P Starace	7	6
(Portugal) F Gil (Portugal) R Machado	6	6
2	(Germany) D Gremelmayr (Germany) P Marx	4	2

Semifinals
(Italy) A di Mauro (Italy) U Vico	4	2
(Colombia) S Giraldo (Spain) P Riba	6	6
4	(Italy) D Bracciali (Italy) P Starace	7	7
(Portugal) F Gil (Portugal) R Machado	6^{4}	5

Finals
(Colombia) S Giraldo (Spain) P Riba	3	4
4	(Italy) D Bracciali (Italy) P Starace	6	6
