= 2010 Trani Cup – Singles =

Singles
- 2010 Trani Cup

Final
- Champion: (Netherlands) Jesse Huta Galung
- Runner-up: (Italy) Filippo Volandri
- Score: 7–6(3), 6–4

Events
Singles	Doubles
← 2009 ·	Trani Cup	· 2011 →

Daniel Köllerer was the defending champion but decided not to participate this year.
Jesse Huta Galung won the title, after defeating Adrian Mannarino 7–6(3), 6–4 in the final.

== Seeds ==
1. (Russia) Igor Andreev (first round)
2. (Australia) Peter Luczak (first round)
3. (Italy) Paolo Lorenzi (first round)
4. (Italy) Filippo Volandri (final)
5. (Belgium) Steve Darcis (first round)
6. (Spain) Santiago Ventura (first round)
7. (Portugal) Rui Machado (second round)
8. (Italy) Simone Vagnozzi (first round)

== Draw ==
=== Key ===
- Q = Qualifier
- WC = Wild card
- LL = Lucky loser
- Alt = Alternate
- SE = Special exempt
- PR = Protected ranking
- ITF = ITF entry
- JE = Junior exempt
- w/o = Walkover
- r = Retired
- d = Defaulted
- SR = Special ranking

=== Finals ===
Semifinals
(Portugal) Leonardo Tavares	5	4
4	(Italy) Filippo Volandri	7	6
(Netherlands) Jesse Huta Galung	6	6
WC	(Italy) Matteo Trevisan	1	3

Final
4	(Italy) Filippo Volandri	6^{3}	4
(Netherlands) Jesse Huta Galung	7	6

=== Top half ===
First round
1	(Russia) I Andreev	5	3
(Portugal) L Tavares	7	6
(Spain) D Marrero	6	4	6
(Spain) P Clar-Rosselló	4	6	3
WC	(Italy) Andrea Arnaboldi	6	3	6
Q	(Germany) Patrick Taubert	3	6	4
(Poland) J Janowicz	6	6
6	(Spain) S Ventura	1	2
4	(Italy) F Volandri	6	6
(Italy) S Galvani	4	4
(Belgium) R Bemelmans	7	6
Q	(Italy) Marco Viola	6^{3}	4
WC	(Italy) F Aldi	7	6
Q	(France) Thomas Cazes-Carrère	6^{5}	4
(Argentina) M Alund	7	6
8	(Italy) S Vagnozzi	5	1

Second round
(Portugal) L Tavares	7	6
(Spain) D Marrero	6^{0}	2
WC	(Italy) A Arnaboldi	6^{4}	4
(Poland) J Janowicz	7	6
4	(Italy) F Volandri	6	3	7
(Belgium) R Bemelmans	4	6	5
WC	(Italy) F Aldi	4	6	6
(Argentina) M Alund	6	2	2

Quarterfinals
(Portugal) L Tavares	4	6	6
(Poland) J Janowicz	6	4	3
4	(Italy) F Volandri	6	6
WC	(Italy) F Aldi	0	4

Semifinals
(Portugal) L Tavares	5	4
4	(Italy) F Volandri	7	6

=== Bottom half ===
First round
7	(Portugal) R Machado	6	6
(Germany) S Stadler	3	1
(Czech Republic) J Pospíšil	4	6^{2}
(Netherlands) J Huta Galung	6	7
(Chile) J Aguilar	6^{2}	0	r
(Italy) F Cipolla	7	4
Q	(Serbia) N Ćirić	6	3	6
3	(Italy) P Lorenzi	3	6	0
5	(Belgium) S Darcis	5	6	6^{1}
(Italy) D Giorgini	7	1	7
(Romania) V Crivoi	4	6	7
(France) B Paire	6	3	6^{2}
WC	(Italy) M Viola	4	5
(Italy) A di Mauro	6	7
WC	(Italy) M Trevisan	7	0	6
2	(Australia) P Luczak	6^{4}	6	4

Second round
7	(Portugal) R Machado	2	3
(Netherlands) J Huta Galung	6	6
(Italy) F Cipolla	6	4	6
Q	(Serbia) N Ćirić	4	6	4
(Italy) D Giorgini	6	5
(Romania) V Crivoi	2	2	r
(Italy) A di Mauro	6^{2}	6	5
WC	(Italy) M Trevisan	7	3	7

Quarterfinals
(Netherlands) J Huta Galung	3	6	6
(Italy) F Cipolla	6	4	2
(Italy) D Giorgini	6^{6}	2
WC	(Italy) M Trevisan	7	6

Semifinals
(Netherlands) J Huta Galung	6	6
WC	(Italy) M Trevisan	1	3
