= 2009 Siemens Open =

- Date: July 6 – July 12
- Edition: 17th
- Location: Scheveningen, Netherlands

Champions

Singles
- (Belgium) Kristof Vliegen

Doubles
- (Argentina) Lucas Arnold Ker / (Argentina) Máximo González
← 2008 ·	Siemens Open	· 2010 →

The 2009 Siemens Open was a professional tennis tournament played on outdoor red clay courts. This was the seventeenth edition of the tournament which is part of the Tretorn SERIE+ of the 2009 ATP Challenger Tour. It took place in Scheveningen, Netherlands between 6 July and 12 July 2009.

== Singles entrants ==
=== Seeds ===
Nationality	Player	Ranking*	Seeding
ESP	Albert Montañés	33	1
ARG	Máximo González	62	2
BEL	Steve Darcis	77	3
FRA	Julien Benneteau	81	4
BEL	Kristof Vliegen	82	5
AUT	Daniel Köllerer	91	6
ESP	Daniel Gimeno-Traver	98	7
GER	Simon Greul	106	8

- Rankings are as of June 29, 2009.

=== Other entrants ===
The following players received wildcards into the singles main draw:

- (Netherlands) Stephan Fransen
- (Netherlands) Thomas Schoorel
- (Netherlands) Raemon Sluiter

The following players received entry from the qualifying draw:

- (France) Augustin Gensse
- (Australia) Rameez Junaid
- (Germany) Gero Kretschmer
- (Sweden) Filip Prpic
- (Czech Republic) Adam Vejmělka (as a Lucky Loser)

== Champions ==
=== Singles ===
(Belgium) Kristof Vliegen def. (Spain) Albert Montañés, 4–2, RET.

=== Doubles ===
(Argentina) Lucas Arnold Ker / (Argentina) Máximo González def. (Netherlands) Thomas Schoorel / (Netherlands) Nick van der Meer, 7–5, 6–2
