= 2009 Sporting Challenger =

2009 sports event

- Date: June 29 – July 5
- Edition: 8th
- Location: Turin, Italy

Champions

Singles
- (Italy) Potito Starace

Doubles
- (Italy) Daniele Bracciali / (Italy) Potito Starace
← 2008 ·	Sporting Challenger	· 2010 →

The 2009 Sporting Challenger was a professional tennis tournament played on outdoor red clay courts. It was the ninth edition of the tournament which was part of the Tretorn SERIE+ of the 2009 ATP Challenger Tour. It took place in Turin, Italy between 29 June and 5 July 2009.

== Singles entrants ==
=== Seeds ===
Nationality	Player	Ranking*	Seeding
ARG	Máximo González	62	1
ITA	Potito Starace	80	2
POR	Frederico Gil	83	3
ARG	Diego Junqueira	85	4
USA	Kevin Kim	86	5
AUT	Daniel Köllerer	91	6
BRA	Marcos Daniel	103	7
GER	Simon Greul	106	8

- Rankings are as of June 22, 2009.

=== Other entrants ===
The following players received wildcards into the singles main draw:

- (Italy) Andrea Arnaboldi
- (Italy) Alessio di Mauro
- (Italy) Thomas Fabbiano
- (Italy) Matteo Trevisan

The following players received entry from the qualifying draw:

- (Spain) Sergio Gutiérrez-Ferrol
- (Spain) Adrián Menéndez-Maceiras
- (Argentina) Cristian Villagrán
- (Argentina) Mariano Zabaleta

The following players received lucky loser spots:

- (Australia) Joseph Sirianni

== Champions ==
=== Singles ===
(Italy) Potito Starace def. (Argentina) Máximo González, 7–6(4), 6–3

=== Doubles ===
(Italy) Daniele Bracciali / (Italy) Potito Starace def. (Colombia) Santiago Giraldo / (Spain) Pere Riba, 6–3, 6–4
