= 2009 Zucchetti Kos Tennis Cup – Singles =

Singles
- 2009 Zucchetti Kos Tennis Cup

Final
- Champion: (Australia) Peter Luczak
- Runner-up: (Belgium) Olivier Rochus
- Score: 6–3, 3–6, 6–1

Events
Singles	Doubles
← 2008 ·	Zucchetti Kos Tennis Cup	· 2010 →

Filippo Volandri was the defending champion, but he was eliminated by Olivier Rochus in the semifinal.
Peter Luczak defeated Rochus in the final 6–3, 3–6, 6–1.

== Seeds ==
1. (Brazil) ~~Marcos Daniel~~ (withdrew)
2. (Belgium) Christophe Rochus (semifinals)
3. (Austria) Daniel Köllerer (quarterfinals)
4. (Romania) Victor Crivoi (quarterfinals)
5. (Belgium) Olivier Rochus (final)
6. (Spain) Óscar Hernández (quarterfinals)
7. (Spain) Alberto Martín (second round)
8. (Australia) Peter Luczak (champion)
9. (Argentina) Brian Dabul (quarterfinals)

== Draw ==
=== Key ===
- Q = Qualifier
- WC = Wild card
- LL = Lucky loser
- Alt = Alternate
- SE = Special exempt
- PR = Protected ranking
- ITF = ITF entry
- JE = Junior exempt
- w/o = Walkover
- r = Retired
- d = Defaulted
- SR = Special ranking

=== Final four ===
Semifinals
5	(Belgium) Olivier Rochus	5	6	6
(Italy) Filippo Volandri	7	1	2
8	(Australia) Peter Luczak	7	6
2	(Belgium) Christophe Rochus	5	3

Final
5	(Belgium) Olivier Rochus	3	6	1
8	(Australia) Peter Luczak	6	3	6

=== Top half ===
First round
9	(Argentina) B Dabul	5	6	6
(Argentina) S Decoud	7	2	2
(Czech Republic) J Vaněk	4	4
(Italy) A di Mauro	6	6
Q	(Italy) M Trevisan	4	3
(Germany) D Gremelmayr	6	6
(Italy) T Tenconi	4	2
5	(Belgium) O Rochus	6	6
4	(Romania) V Crivoi	6	6
Q	(Spain) P Martín-Adalia	3	1
(Argentina) S Roitman	1	5
(Czech Republic) L Rosol	6	7
(Italy) F Volandri	7	6
WC	(Italy) D Bracciali	5	4
WC	(Argentina) G Gaudio	6	3	1
7	(Spain) A Martín	4	6	6

Second round
9	(Argentina) B Dabul	3	6	6
(Italy) A di Mauro	6	2	1
(Germany) D Gremelmayr	3	2
5	(Belgium) O Rochus	6	6
4	(Romania) V Crivoi	7	6
(Czech Republic) L Rosol	6^{3}	1
(Italy) F Volandri	6	6
7	(Spain) A Martín	3	4

Quarterfinals
9	(Argentina) B Dabul	6^{3}	1
5	(Belgium) O Rochus	7	6
4	(Romania) V Crivoi	2	5
(Italy) F Volandri	6	7

Semifinals
5	(Belgium) O Rochus	5	6	6
(Italy) F Volandri	7	1	2

=== Bottom half ===
First round
8	(Australia) P Luczak	6	7
(Italy) M Crugnola	1	5
(Portugal) R Machado	7	6
LL	(South Korea) D Yoo	6^{4}	4
(Sweden) A Vinciguerra	6	6
(Italy) P Lorenzi	1	2
(Czech Republic) R Vik	1	2
3	(Austria) D Köllerer	6	6
6	(Spain) Ó Hernández	6	4	6
(Czech Republic) J Hájek	3	6	2
WC	(Germany) J Jahn	6^{6}	6	6
Q	(France) B Paire	7	4	3
(Slovakia) P Červenák	7	6
(Italy) G Petrazzuolo	6^{4}	4
Q	(Romania) A Ungur	3	5
2	(Belgium) C Rochus	6	7

Second round
8	(Australia) P Luczak	6	7
(Portugal) R Machado	3	6^{9}
(Sweden) A Vinciguerra	3	2	d
3	(Austria) D Köllerer	6	5
6	(Spain) Ó Hernández	5	6	6
WC	(Germany) J Jahn	7	3	2
(Slovakia) P Červenák	4	6^{8}
2	(Belgium) C Rochus	6	7

Quarterfinals
8	(Australia) P Luczak	6	6
3	(Austria) D Köllerer	2	1
6	(Spain) Ó Hernández	2	3
2	(Belgium) C Rochus	6	6

Semifinals
8	(Australia) P Luczak	7	6
2	(Belgium) C Rochus	5	3
