= 2011 Trani Cup – Doubles =

Doubles
- 2011 Trani Cup

Final
- Champions: (Chile) Jorge Aguilar (Argentina) Andrés Molteni
- Runners-up: (Italy) Giulio Di Meo (Italy) Stefano Ianni
- Score: 6–4, 6–4

Events
| Singles | Doubles |
| ← 2010 · | Trani Cup | · 2012 → |

Matteo Trevisan and Thomas Fabbiano were the defending champions but decided not to participate.
Jorge Aguilar and Andrés Molteni won the title, defeating Giulio Di Meo and Stefano Ianni 6–4, 6–4 in the final.

== Seeds ==
1. (Italy) Alessio di Mauro / (Italy) Alessandro Motti (quarterfinals)
2. (Australia) Sadik Kadir / (India) Purav Raja (semifinals)
3. (Chile) Jorge Aguilar / (Argentina) Andrés Molteni (champions)
4. (Italy) Alberto Brizzi / (Italy) Marco Crugnola (quarterfinals)

== Draw ==
=== Key ===
- Q = Qualifier
- WC = Wild card
- LL = Lucky loser
- Alt = Alternate
- SE = Special exempt
- PR = Protected ranking
- ITF = ITF entry
- JE = Junior exempt
- w/o = Walkover
- r = Retired
- d = Defaulted
- SR = Special ranking

=== Draw ===
First round
1 | (Italy) A di Mauro (Italy) A Motti | 6 | 6
(Portugal) B Mota (Portugal) P Sousa | 4 | 4
(Czech Republic) I Minář (Czech Republic) J Minář | 1 | 1
(Italy) G Di Meo (Italy) S Ianni | 6 | 6
4 | (Italy) A Brizzi (Italy) M Crugnola | 5 | 6 | [10]
(Netherlands) J Huta Galung (Greece) N Karagiannis | 7 | 3 | [5]
(France) J Dasnières de Veigy (France) D Guez
(Australia) N Roshan (New Zealand) J Statham | w/o
(Brazil) L Kirche (Argentina) Nicolás Pastor | 6 | 6
(Moldova) R Albot (Australia) J Lemke | 1 | 1
(Poland) G Panfil (Italy) Marco Sanges | 2 | 0
3 | (Chile) J Aguilar (Argentina) A Molteni | 6 | 6
(Belgium) Y Mertens (France) Florian Reynet | 6 | 6
WC | (Italy) Luigi Bianchi (Italy) Tommaso Laurora | 0 | 2
(Mexico) C Ramírez (Mexico) M Sánchez | 4 | 1
2 | (Australia) S Kadir (India) P Raja | 6 | 6

Quarterfinals
1 | (Italy) A di Mauro (Italy) A Motti | 6^{2} | 5
(Italy) G Di Meo (Italy) S Ianni | 7^{7} | 7
4 | (Italy) A Brizzi (Italy) M Crugnola | 4 | 0
(Australia) N Roshan (New Zealand) J Statham | 6 | 6
(Brazil) L Kirche (Argentina) Nicolás Pastor | 2 | 2
3 | (Chile) J Aguilar (Argentina) A Molteni | 6 | 6
(Belgium) Y Mertens (France) Florian Reynet | 3 | 2
2 | (Australia) S Kadir (India) P Raja | 6 | 6

Semifinals
(Italy) G Di Meo (Italy) S Ianni | 6 | 6
(Australia) N Roshan (New Zealand) J Statham | 2 | 4
3 | (Chile) J Aguilar (Argentina) A Molteni | 6 | 6
2 | (Australia) S Kadir (India) P Raja | 2 | 2

Final
(Italy) G Di Meo (Italy) S Ianni | 4 | 4
3 | (Chile) J Aguilar (Argentina) A Molteni | 6 | 6
