= 2011 Trani Cup – Singles =

Singles
- 2011 Trani Cup

Final
- Champion: (Belgium) Steve Darcis
- Runner-up: (Argentina) Leonardo Mayer
- Score: 4–6, 6–3, 6–2

Events
Singles	Doubles
← 2010 ·	Trani Cup	· 2012 →

Jesse Huta Galung was the defending champion, but lost against eventual finalist Leonardo Mayer in the first round.

3rd seed Steve Darcis won the title, defeating Mayer 4–6, 6–3, 6–2 in the final.

== Seeds ==
1. (Portugal) Rui Machado (semifinals)
2. (Portugal) Frederico Gil (first round)
3. (Belgium) Steve Darcis (champion)
4. (Netherlands) Jesse Huta Galung (first round)
5. (Czech Republic) Ivo Minář (first round)
6. (Serbia) Nikola Ćirić (second round)
7. (Italy) Matteo Viola (second round)
8. (France) David Guez (first round)

== Draw ==
=== Key ===
- Q = Qualifier
- WC = Wild card
- LL = Lucky loser
- Alt = Alternate
- SE = Special exempt
- PR = Protected ranking
- ITF = ITF entry
- JE = Junior exempt
- w/o = Walkover
- r = Retired
- d = Defaulted
- SR = Special ranking

=== Final four ===
Semifinals
1	(Portugal) Rui Machado	4	0
(Argentina) Leonardo Mayer	6	6
3	(Belgium) Steve Darcis	6	6
WC	(Italy) Andrea Arnaboldi	2	0

Final
(Argentina) Leonardo Mayer	6	3	2
3	(Belgium) Steve Darcis	4	6	6

=== Top half ===
First round
1	(Portugal) R Machado	6	6
(Chile) J Aguilar	2	1
(Belgium) Y Mertens	6	6
(Argentina) A Molteni	4	2
(Austria) M Fischer	6	4	6
(Germany) Jan-Lennard Struff	3	6	4
Q	(Argentina) Nicolás Pastor	5	3
6	(Serbia) N Ćirić	7	6
4	(Netherlands) J Huta Galung	7^{7}	2	1
(Argentina) L Mayer	6^{5}	6	6
(Hungary) Á Kellner	6	6
Q	(Italy) A Brizzi	4	0
(Italy) G Naso	3	4
(Argentina) F Delbonis	6	6
WC	(Italy) M Trevisan	6	6
5	(Czech Republic) I Minář	3	4

Second round
1	(Portugal) R Machado	6	6
(Belgium) Y Mertens	2	3
(Austria) M Fischer	6	6
6	(Serbia) N Ćirić	2	4
(Argentina) L Mayer	4	7^{7}	6
(Hungary) Á Kellner	6	6^{0}	1
(Argentina) F Delbonis	4	6	4
WC	(Italy) M Trevisan	6	2	6

Quarterfinals
1	(Portugal) R Machado	6	6
(Austria) M Fischer	0	3
(Argentina) L Mayer	6	6
WC	(Italy) M Trevisan	4	2

Semifinals
1	(Portugal) R Machado	4	0
(Argentina) L Mayer	6	6

=== Bottom half ===
First round
7	(Italy) M Viola	3	7^{7}	6
(Czech Republic) D Lojda	6	6^{5}	0
Q	(Portugal) P Sousa	2	6	4
WC	(Romania) A Ungur	6	4	6
Q	(Argentina) Marco Trungelliti	2	3
(Italy) A di Mauro	6	6
(Italy) M Crugnola	5	3
3	(Belgium) S Darcis	7	6
8	(France) D Guez	3	1
(Belgium) D Goffin	6	6
SE	(France) J Dasnières de Veigy	3	1
SE	(Belgium) M Authom	6	6
(Italy) S Galvani	6	6
(Australia) J Lemke	4	1
WC	(Italy) Andrea Arnaboldi	1	6	6
2/WC	(Portugal) F Gil	6	4	1

Second round
7	(Italy) M Viola	4	6	1
WC	(Romania) A Ungur	6	3	6
(Italy) A di Mauro	6^{5}	2
3	(Belgium) S Darcis	7^{7}	6
(Belgium) D Goffin	6	6
SE	(Belgium) M Authom	3	1
(Italy) S Galvani	4	6^{6}
WC	(Italy) Andrea Arnaboldi	6	7^{8}

Quarterfinals
WC	(Romania) A Ungur	1	3
3	(Belgium) S Darcis	6	6
(Belgium) D Goffin	5	1
WC	(Italy) Andrea Arnaboldi	7	6

Semifinals
3	(Belgium) S Darcis	6	6
WC	(Italy) Andrea Arnaboldi	2	0
