= 2011 Sporting Challenger =

- Date: 26 June – 3 July
- Edition: 10th
- Location: Turin, Italy

Champions

Singles
- (Argentina) Carlos Berlocq

Doubles
- (Austria) Martin Fischer / (Austria) Philipp Oswald
← 2010 ·	Sporting Challenger	· 2012 →

The 2011 Sporting Challenger was a professional tennis tournament played on clay courts. It was the tenth edition of the tournament which was part of the 2011 ATP Challenger Tour and the Tretorn SERIE+ series. It took place in Turin, Italy between June 26 and July 3, 2011.

== ATP entrants ==
=== Seeds ===
Country	Player	Rank^{1}	Seed
ESP	Daniel Gimeno Traver	59	1
ARG	Carlos Berlocq	70	2
ITA	Filippo Volandri	81	3
ESP	Albert Ramos	87	4
ARG	Diego Junqueira	108	5
ITA	Flavio Cipolla	112	6
FRA	Marc Gicquel	119	7
ESP	Rubén Ramírez Hidalgo	121	8

- ^{1} Rankings are as of June 20, 2011.

=== Other entrants ===
The following players received wildcards into the singles main draw:

- (Italy) Andrea Arnaboldi
- (Italy) Alessandro Giannessi
- (Italy) Stefano Travaglia
- (Italy) Matteo Trevisan

The following players received entry from the qualifying draw:

- (Italy) Alberto Brizzi
- (Italy) Marco Crugnola
- (Italy) Stefano Galvani
- (Serbia) Dušan Lajović

== Champions ==
=== Singles ===
(Argentina) Carlos Berlocq def. (Spain) Albert Ramos, 6–4, 6–3

=== Doubles ===
(Austria) Martin Fischer / (Austria) Philipp Oswald def. (Belarus) Uladzimir Ignatik / (Slovakia) Martin Kližan, 6–3, 6–4
