= 2009 Trani Cup =

- Date: August 17 – August 23
- Edition: 7th
- Location: Trani, Italy

Champions

Singles
- (Austria) Daniel Köllerer

Doubles
- (United Kingdom) Jamie Delgado / (United Kingdom) Jamie Murray
| ← 2008 · | Trani Cup | · 2010 → |

The 2009 Trani Cup was a professional tennis tournament played on outdoor red clay courts. It was the seventh edition of the tournament which was part of the 2009 ATP Challenger Tour. It took place in Trani, Italy between 17 and 23 August 2009.

== Singles entrants ==
=== Seeds ===
| Nationality | Player | Ranking* | Seeding |
|---|---|---|---|
| BEL | Christophe Rochus | 63 | 1 |
| GER | Simon Greul | 70 | 2 |
| AUT | Daniel Köllerer | 73 | 3 |
| ITA | Flavio Cipolla | 116 | 4 |
| ARG | Sebastián Decoud | 136 | 5 |
| ARG | ~~Brian Dabul~~ | ~~141~~ | ~~6~~ |
| ESP | Pere Riba | 153 | 7 |
| ITA | Tomas Tenconi | 157 | 8 |

- Rankings are as of August 10, 2009.

=== Other entrants ===
The following players received wildcards into the singles main draw:

- (Argentina) Carlos Berlocq
- (Italy) Daniele Bracciali
- (Italy) Flavio Cipolla
- (Italy) Filippo Volandri

The following players received entry from the qualifying draw:

- (Italy) Francesco Aldi
- (Italy) Marco Crugnola
- (Italy) Stefano Ianni
- (Germany) Sebastian Rieschick (as a Lucky Loser)
- (Italy) Matteo Trevisan

== Champions ==
=== Singles ===
(Austria) Daniel Köllerer def. (Italy) Filippo Volandri, 6–3, 7–5

=== Doubles ===
(United Kingdom) Jamie Delgado / (United Kingdom) Jamie Murray def. (Germany) Simon Greul / (Italy) Alessandro Motti, 3–6, 6–4, [12–10]
