= 2009 Siemens Open – Doubles =

Doubles
- 2009 Siemens Open

Final
- Champions: (Argentina) Lucas Arnold Ker (Argentina) Máximo González
- Runners-up: (Netherlands) Thomas Schoorel (Netherlands) Nick van der Meer
- Score: 7–5, 6–2

Events
Singles	Doubles
← 2008 ·	Siemens Open	· 2010 →

Rameez Junaid and Philipp Marx were the defending champions, but they lost to Schoorel and van der Meer in the semifinal.
Lucas Arnold Ker and Máximo González won in the final 7–5, 6–2, against Thomas Schoorel and Nick van der Meer.

== Seeds ==
1. (Argentina) Lucas Arnold Ker / (Argentina) Máximo González (champions)
2. (Australia) Rameez Junaid / (Germany) Philipp Marx (semifinals)
3. (Spain) Daniel Gimeno-Traver / (Spain) Daniel Muñoz-de la Nava (first round)
4. (Poland) Tomasz Bednarek / (Czech Republic) Lukáš Rosol (quarterfinals)

== Draw ==
=== Key ===
- Q = Qualifier
- WC = Wild card
- LL = Lucky loser
- Alt = Alternate
- SE = Special exempt
- PR = Protected ranking
- ITF = ITF entry
- JE = Junior exempt
- w/o = Walkover
- r = Retired
- d = Defaulted
- SR = Special ranking

=== Draw ===
First round
WC	(Netherlands) R Bruggeling (Netherlands) B van der Valk
(Netherlands) J Huta Galung (Spain) P Riba	w/o
3	(Spain) D Gimeno-Traver (Spain) D Muñoz-de la Nava	6^{7}	6^{6}
(Netherlands) R Sluiter (Netherlands) P Wessels	7	7
WC	(Netherlands) S Fransen (Netherlands) R Frantzen	5	1
(Netherlands) A van der Duim (Netherlands) B Westerhof	7	6
(Netherlands) T Schoorel (Netherlands) N van der Meer	7	6
(Sweden) F Prpic (Australia) J Sirianni	5	2
(Argentina) G Cañas (France) L Recouderc	w/o
3	(Poland) T Bednarek (Czech Republic) L Rosol
(Argentina) J-P Amado (Austria) D Köllerer	6	6
WC	(Netherlands) P Moggre (Netherlands) I Sijsling	2	4

Quarterfinals
1	(Argentina) L Arnold Ker (Argentina) M González	7	6
WC	(Netherlands) R Bruggeling (Netherlands) B van der Valk	5	2
(Netherlands) R Sluiter (Netherlands) P Wessels	3	7	[4]
(Netherlands) A van der Duim (Netherlands) B Westerhof	6	6^{2}	[10]
(Netherlands) T Schoorel (Netherlands) N van der Meer	6	7
3	(Poland) T Bednarek (Czech Republic) L Rosol	4	5
(Argentina) J-P Amado (Austria) D Köllerer	3	2
2	(Australia) R Junaid (Germany) P Marx	6	6

Semifinals
1	(Argentina) L Arnold Ker (Argentina) M González	6	7
(Netherlands) A van der Duim (Netherlands) B Westerhof	4	5
(Netherlands) T Schoorel (Netherlands) N van der Meer	6	6
2	(Australia) R Junaid (Germany) P Marx	4	3

Finals
1	(Argentina) L Arnold Ker (Argentina) M González	7	6
(Netherlands) T Schoorel (Netherlands) N van der Meer	5	2
