= 2009 Siemens Open – Singles =

Singles
- 2009 Siemens Open

Final
- Champion: (Belgium) Kristof Vliegen
- Runner-up: (Spain) Albert Montañés
- Score: 4–2, RET.

Events
Singles	Doubles
← 2008 ·	Siemens Open	· 2010 →

Jesse Huta Galung was the title defender, but he lost to Pablo Cuevas already in the first round.
Kristof Vliegen became the new champion, after retired Albert Montañés in the final.

== Seeds ==
1. (Spain) Albert Montañés (final, retired)
2. (Argentina) Máximo González (first round)
3. (Belgium) Steve Darcis (semifinals)
4. (France) Julien Benneteau (second round)
5. (Belgium) Kristof Vliegen (champion)
6. (Austria) Daniel Köllerer (quarterfinals)
7. (Spain) Daniel Gimeno-Traver (second round)
8. (Germany) Simon Greul (second round)

== Draw ==
=== Key ===
- Q = Qualifier
- WC = Wild card
- LL = Lucky loser
- Alt = Alternate
- SE = Special exempt
- PR = Protected ranking
- ITF = ITF entry
- JE = Junior exempt
- w/o = Walkover
- r = Retired
- d = Defaulted
- SR = Special ranking

=== Final four ===
Semifinals
1	(Spain) Albert Montañés	6	3	6
3	(Belgium) Steve Darcis	4	6	1
5	(Belgium) Kristof Vliegen	6	3	6
(Uruguay) Pablo Cuevas	3	6	3

Final
1	(Spain) Albert Montañés	2^{r}
5	(Belgium) Kristof Vliegen	4

=== Top half ===
First round
1	(Spain) A Montañés	7	6
(Spain) D Muñoz-De La Nava	5	4
(Argentina) J-P Amado	3	6	1
Q	(Germany) G Kretschmer	6	3	6
(Australia) J Sirianni	7	4	3
(Netherlands) T de Bakker	6^{10}	6	6
Q	(Sweden) F Prpic	2	4
6	(Austria) D Köllerer	6	6
3	(Belgium) S Darcis	6	6
(France) L Recouderc	4	3
(Belgium) Y Mertens	6^{1}	3
(Czech Republic) J Vaněk	7	6
(Argentina) JI Chela	6	6
Q	(France) A Gensse	3	2
WC	(Netherlands) T Schoorel	4	4
8	(Germany) S Greul	6	6

Second round
1	(Spain) A Montañés	6	7
Q	(Germany) G Kretschmer	1	6^{3}
(Netherlands) T de Bakker	6	1	1
6	(Austria) D Köllerer	2	6	6
3	(Belgium) S Darcis	4	7	7
(Czech Republic) J Vaněk	6	6^{3}	6^{2}
(Argentina) JI Chela	6^{4}	6	7
8	(Germany) S Greul	7	3	5

Quarterfinals
1	(Spain) A Montañés	5
6	(Austria) D Köllerer	2^{r}
3	(Belgium) S Darcis	7	2	6
(Argentina) JI Chela	5	6	2

Semifinals
1	(Spain) A Montañés	6	3
3	(Belgium) S Darcis	4	6	1

=== Bottom half ===
First round
5	(Belgium) K Vliegen	6	6
(Australia) P Luczak	3	3
WC	(Netherlands) S Fransen	6	4
(Spain) P Riba	1	1^{r}
LL	(Czech Republic) A Vejmělka	7	4	2
(Italy) T Tenconi	6^{5}	6	6
(Germany) J Reister	3	6	2
4	(France) J Benneteau	6	4	6
7	(Spain) D Gimeno-Traver	6	5	6
(Argentina) JP Brzezicki	3	7	2
(Netherlands) J Huta Galung	5	3
(Uruguay) P Cuevas	7	6
(Czech Republic) L Rosol	4	2
Q	(Australia) R Junaid	6	6
WC	(Netherlands) R Sluiter	6	6
2	(Argentina) M González	3	4

Second round
5	(Belgium) K Vliegen	7	7
WC	(Netherlands) S Fransen	5	5
(Italy) T Tenconi	6	7
4	(France) J Benneteau	3	5
7	(Spain) D Gimeno-Traver	6^{2}	6	4
(Uruguay) P Cuevas	7	4	6
Q	(Australia) R Junaid	1	5
WC	(Netherlands) R Sluiter	6	7

Quarterfinals
5	(Belgium) K Vliegen	4	6	6
(Italy) T Tenconi	6	4	2
(Uruguay) P Cuevas	6	6
WC	(Netherlands) R Sluiter	4	2

Semifinals
5	(Belgium) K Vliegen	6	3	6
(Uruguay) P Cuevas	3	6	3
