= 2010 Sporting Challenger – Doubles =

Doubles
- 2010 Sporting Challenger

Final
- Champion: (Portugal) Frederico Gil (Argentina) Carlos Berlocq
- Runner-up: (Italy) Daniele Bracciali (Italy) Potito Starace
- Score: 6–3, 7–6^{(7–5)}

Events
Singles	Doubles
← 2009 ·	Sporting Challenger	· 2011 →

Daniele Bracciali and Potito Starace were the defending champions, but lost in the final to Frederico Gil and Carlos Berlocq by 6–3, 7–6^{(7–5)}.

== Seeds ==
1. (Italy) Daniele Bracciali / (Italy) Potito Starace (runners-up)
2. (Italy) Simone Bolelli / (Italy) Andreas Seppi (quarterfinals, withdrew)
3. (Italy) Alessio di Mauro / (Italy) Alessandro Motti (quarterfinals)
4. (Russia) Teymuraz Gabashvili / (Kazakhstan) Andrey Golubev (first round)

== Main draw ==
=== Key ===
- Q = Qualifier
- WC = Wild card
- LL = Lucky loser
- Alt = Alternate
- SE = Special exempt
- PR = Protected ranking
- ITF = ITF entry
- JE = Junior exempt
- w/o = Walkover
- r = Retired
- d = Defaulted
- SR = Special ranking

=== Draw ===
First round
1	(Italy) D Bracciali (Italy) P Starace	6	6
(Italy) T Fabbiano (Italy) P Lorenzi	4	4
(Slovakia) M Kližan (Portugal) J Sousa	6	6^{5}	[10]
(France) O Charroin (France) V Stouff	4	7	[8]
4	(Russia) T Gabashvili (Kazakhstan) A Golubev	3	7	[8]
(Spain) R Ramírez Hidalgo (Czech Republic) J Vaněk	6	5	[10]
WC	(Italy) A Giraudo (Italy) S Napolitano	7	3	[4]
(Chile) P Capdeville (Argentina) D Junqueira	6	6	[10]
(Argentina) C Berlocq (Portugal) F Gil	7	7
(Brazil) T Alves (Brazil) J Silva	6^{5}	6^{3}
(Spain) D Gimeno-Traver (Spain) I Navarro	4	6^{10}
3	(Italy) A di Mauro (Italy) A Motti	6	7
(Slovenia) B Kavčič (Slovenia) J Semrajc	3	3
(Italy) F Cipolla (Italy) A Giannessi	6	6
WC	(Italy) G Dutto (Italy) A Sibona	4	3
2/WC	(Italy) S Bolelli (Italy) A Seppi	6	6

Quarterfinals
1	(Italy) D Bracciali (Italy) P Starace	6	6
(Slovakia) M Kližan (Portugal) J Sousa	4	1
(Spain) R Ramírez Hidalgo (Czech Republic) J Vaněk	w/o
(Chile) P Capdeville (Argentina) D Junqueira	w/o
(Argentina) C Berlocq (Portugal) F Gil	7	6
3	(Italy) A di Mauro (Italy) A Motti	6^{3}	3
(Italy) F Cipolla (Italy) A Giannessi
2/WC	(Italy) S Bolelli (Italy) A Seppi	w/o

Semifinals
1	(Italy) D Bracciali (Italy) P Starace
Bye
(Argentina) C Berlocq (Portugal) F Gil	6	7	[10]
(Italy) F Cipolla (Italy) A Giannessi	7	6	[8]

Finals
1	(Italy) D Bracciali (Italy) P Starace	3	6^{5}
(Argentina) C Berlocq (Portugal) F Gil	6	7

Note: Rubén Ramírez Hidalgo / Jiří Vaněk and Paul Capdeville / Diego Junqueira, which were supposed to play with Daniele Bracciali / Potito Starace in the semifinals, chose to not compete. Italian pair received "bye" into the final.
