= 2011 Trani Cup =

Tennis tournament

- Date: 1–7 August
- Edition: 9th
- Location: Trani, Italy

Champions

Singles
- (Belgium) Steve Darcis

Doubles
- (Chile) Jorge Aguilar / (Argentina) Andrés Molteni
← 2010 ·	Trani Cup	· 2012 →

The 2011 Trani Cup was a professional tennis tournament played on clay courts. It was the ninth edition of the tournament which was part of the 2011 ATP Challenger Tour. It took place in Trani, Italy between 1 and 7 August 2011.

== Singles main draw entrants ==
=== Seeds ===
Country	Player	Rank^{1}	Seed
POR	Rui Machado	85	1
POR	Frederico Gil	93	2
BEL	Steve Darcis	95	3
NED	Jesse Huta Galung	125	4
CZE	Ivo Minář	148	5
SRB	Nikola Ćirić	153	6
ITA	Matteo Viola	155	7
FRA	David Guez	167	8

- ^{1} Rankings are as of July 25, 2011.

=== Other entrants ===
The following players received wildcards into the singles main draw:

- (Italy) Andrea Arnaboldi
- (Portugal) Frederico Gil
- (Italy) Matteo Trevisan
- (Romania) Adrian Ungur

The following players received entry as a special exempt into the singles main draw:

- (Belgium) Maxime Authom
- (France) Jonathan Dasnières de Veigy

The following players received entry from the qualifying draw:

- (Italy) Alberto Brizzi
- (Argentina) Nicolás Pastor
- (Portugal) Pedro Sousa
- (Argentina) Marco Trungelliti

== Champions ==
=== Singles ===
(Belgium) Steve Darcis def. (Argentina) Leonardo Mayer, 4–6, 6–3, 6–2

=== Doubles ===
(Chile) Jorge Aguilar / (Argentina) Andrés Molteni def. (Italy) Giulio Di Meo / (Italy) Stefano Ianni, 6–4, 6–4
