= 2010 Trani Cup =

- Date: August 9 – August 15
- Edition: 8th
- Location: Trani, Italy

Champions

Singles
- (Netherlands) Jesse Huta Galung

Doubles
- (Italy) Thomas Fabbiano / (Italy) Matteo Trevisan
← 2009 ·	Trani Cup	· 2011 →

The 2010 Trani Cup was a professional tennis tournament played on outdoor red clay courts. It was the eighth edition of the tournament which was part of the 2010 ATP Challenger Tour. It took place in Trani, Italy between 9 and 15 August 2010.

== Singles main draw entrants ==
=== Seeds ===
Nationality	Player	Ranking*	Seeding
RUS	Igor Andreev	95	1
AUS	Peter Luczak	98	2
ITA	Paolo Lorenzi	102	3
ITA	Filippo Volandri	104	4
BEL	Steve Darcis	110	5
ESP	Santiago Ventura	118	6
POR	Rui Machado	125	7
ITA	Simone Vagnozzi	170	8

- Rankings are as of August 2, 2010.

=== Other entrants ===
The following players received wildcards into the singles main draw:

- (Italy) Francesco Aldi
- (Italy) Andrea Arnaboldi
- (Italy) Matteo Trevisan
- (Italy) Matteo Viola

The following players received entry from the qualifying draw:

- (France) Thomas Cazes-Carrère
- (Serbia) Nikola Ćirić
- (Germany) Patrick Taubert
- (Italy) Marco Viola

== Champions ==
=== Singles ===
(Netherlands) Jesse Huta Galung def. (Italy) Filippo Volandri, 7–6(3), 6–4

=== Doubles ===
(Italy) Thomas Fabbiano / (Italy) Matteo Trevisan def. (Italy) Daniele Bracciali / (Italy) Filippo Volandri, 6–2, 7–5
