= 2010 Pekao Szczecin Open – Singles =

Singles
- 2010 Pekao Szczecin Open

Final
- Champion: (Uruguay) Pablo Cuevas
- Runner-up: (Russia) Igor Andreev
- Score: 6–1, 6–1

Events
Singles	Doubles
- Pekao Szczecin Open

Evgeny Korolev was the defending champion, but decided not to participate.
Pablo Cuevas defeated Igor Andreev 6–1, 6–1 to win the title.

== Seeds ==
1. (Poland) Łukasz Kubot (second round)
2. (Uruguay) Pablo Cuevas (champion)
3. (Germany) Tobias Kamke (quarterfinals)
4. (Russia) ~~Teymuraz Gabashvili~~ (withdrew)
5. (Germany) Julian Reister (quarterfinals)
6. (Spain) Pablo Andújar (first round)
7. (Chile) Nicolás Massú (first round)
8. (Russia) Igor Andreev (final)
9. (Jamaica) Dustin Brown (second round)

== Draw ==
Key

- Q = Qualifier
- WC = Wild card
- LL = Lucky loser
- Alt = Alternate
- ITF = ITF entry
- PR = Protected ranking
- SR = Special ranking
- SE = Special exempt
- JE = Junior exempt
- JR = Junior Accelerator Programme entrant
- CO = College Accelerator Programme entrant
- NG = Next Gen Accelerator Program entrant
- w/o = Walkover
- r = Retired
- d = Defaulted

=== Finals ===
Semifinals
(France) Olivier Patience	3	2
8	(Russia) Igor Andreev	6	6
(Spain) Daniel Muñoz de la Nava	4	7	1
2	(Uruguay) Pablo Cuevas	6	6^{3}	6

Final
8	(Russia) Igor Andreev	1	1
2	(Uruguay) Pablo Cuevas	6	6

=== Top half ===
First round
1	(Poland) Ł Kubot	6	7
Q	(Germany) P Torebko	4	5
Q	(France) N Devilder	2	4
(Czech Republic) L Rosol	6	6
(Czech Republic) J Hernych	6^{3}	7	2
(France) O Patience	7	5	6
(Slovakia) P Červenák	6	6
7	(Chile) N Massú	3	3
3	(Germany) T Kamke	6	6
PR	(Czech Republic) J Vaněk	2	0
Q	(Germany) D Blömke	6	6
(Czech Republic) D Lojda	3	1
(Netherlands) J Huta Galung	6	7
(Germany) M Zverev	4	5
(Germany) A Begemann	3	3
8	(Russia) I Andreev	6	6

Second round
1	(Poland) Ł Kubot	4	5
(Czech Republic) L Rosol	6	7
(France) O Patience	6	6
(Slovakia) P Červenák	3	4
3	(Germany) T Kamke	6	6
Q	(Germany) D Blömke	1	1
(Netherlands) J Huta Galung	4	7	3
8	(Russia) I Andreev	6	6^{8}	6

Quarterfinals
(Czech Republic) L Rosol	6^{5}	4
(France) O Patience	7	6
3	(Germany) T Kamke	7	3	3
8	(Russia) I Andreev	6^{4}	6	6

Semifinals
(France) O Patience	3	2
8	(Russia) I Andreev	6	6

=== Bottom half ===
First round
6	(Spain) P Andújar	3	3
(Spain) D Muñoz de la Nava	6	6
(Ukraine) I Sergeyev	6	6
LL	(France) L Rochette	2	0
SE	(Germany) J-L Struff	6^{4}	6^{3}
(France) V Millot	7	7
WC	(Poland) M Smoła	6^{3}	3
9	(Jamaica) D Brown	7	6
5	(Germany) J Reister	6	6
WC	(Poland) R Gozdur	3	1
WC	(Poland) M Gawron	6	6
Q	(Czech Republic) D Lustig	4	4
(Netherlands) I Sijsling	7	7
WC	(Slovakia) M Mečíř Jr.	6^{6}	6^{2}
(Austria) D Köllerer	6	4	r
2	(Uruguay) P Cuevas	2	6

Second round
(Spain) D Muñoz de la Nava	6	6
(Ukraine) I Sergeyev	3	4
(France) V Millot	6	6
9	(Jamaica) D Brown	3	3
5	(Germany) J Reister	7	4	6
WC	(Poland) M Gawron	5	6	1
(Netherlands) I Sijsling	4	2
2	(Uruguay) P Cuevas	6	6

Quarterfinals
(Spain) D Muñoz de la Nava	7	4	6
(France) V Millot	5	6	4
5	(Germany) J Reister	6	4	5
2	(Uruguay) P Cuevas	2	6	7

Semifinals
(Spain) D Muñoz de la Nava	4	7	1
2	(Uruguay) Pablo Cuevas	6	6^{3}	6
