= 2010 Zucchetti Kos Tennis Cup – Doubles =

Doubles
- 2010 Zucchetti Kos Tennis Cup

Final
- Champions: (Netherlands) Robin Haase (Netherlands) Rogier Wassen
- Runners-up: (United States) James Cerretani (Canada) Adil Shamasdin
- Score: 7–6(14), 7–5

Events
Singles	Doubles
← 2009 ·	Zucchetti Kos Tennis Cup	· 2011 →

James Cerretani and Travis Rettenmaier were the defending champions, but Rettenmaier decided not to participate this year.
Cerretani partnered up with Adil Shamasdin and they reached the final, where they lost to Robin Haase and Rogier Wassen 6–7(14), 5–7.

== Seeds ==
1. (United States) James Cerretani / (Canada) Adil Shamasdin (final)
2. (United States) Brian Battistone / (India) Harsh Mankad (first round)
3. (United Kingdom) Jamie Delgado / (Croatia) Lovro Zovko (semifinals)
4. (Germany) Frank Moser / (Czech Republic) Lukáš Rosol (first round)

== Draw ==
=== Key ===
- Q = Qualifier
- WC = Wild card
- LL = Lucky loser
- Alt = Alternate
- SE = Special exempt
- PR = Protected ranking
- ITF = ITF entry
- JE = Junior exempt
- w/o = Walkover
- r = Retired
- d = Defaulted
- SR = Special ranking

=== Draw ===
First round
1	(United States) J Cerretani (Canada) A Shamasdin	6	7
WC	(Italy) F Allgauer (Italy) S Tarallo	2	5
(Austria) D Köllerer (Germany) M Zverev	6	4	[10]
WC	(Italy) A Motti (Italy) A Stoppini	2	6	[5]
3	(United Kingdom) J Delgado (Croatia) L Zovko	6	6
(Czech Republic) D Lojda (France) B Paire	1	2
(Germany) M Emmrich (Sweden) A Siljeström	6	6
(Belgium) C Rochus (France) É Roger-Vasselin	4	4
(Spain) R Bautista-Agut (Spain) D Muñoz-De La Nava	6	4	[10]
(Chile) J Aguilar (Spain) A Ramos-Viñolas	2	6	[2]
(Argentina) C Berlocq (Portugal) R Machado	7	6
4	(Germany) F Moser (Czech Republic) L Rosol	6^{4}	2
(Argentina) JP Brzezicki (Austria) A Peya	4	6	[8]
WC	(Italy) M Navarra (Romania) A Ungur	6	4	[10]
(Netherlands) R Haase (Netherlands) R Wassen	6^{3}	6	[10]
2	(United States) B Battistone (India) H Mankad	7	3	[4]

Quarterfinals
1	(United States) J Cerretani (Canada) A Shamasdin
(Austria) D Köllerer (Germany) M Zverev	w/o
3	(United Kingdom) J Delgado (Croatia) L Zovko	7	6
(Germany) M Emmrich (Sweden) A Siljeström	6^{4}	2
(Spain) R Bautista-Agut (Spain) D Muñoz-De La Nava	6	2	[5]
(Argentina) C Berlocq (Portugal) R Machado	1	6	[10]
WC	(Italy) M Navarra (Romania) A Ungur	3	2
(Netherlands) R Haase (Netherlands) R Wassen	6	6

Semifinals
1	(United States) J Cerretani (Canada) A Shamasdin	7	6
3	(United Kingdom) J Delgado (Croatia) L Zovko	6^{4}	3
(Argentina) C Berlocq (Portugal) R Machado	6	2	[7]
(Netherlands) R Haase (Netherlands) R Wassen	3	6	[10]

Finals
1	(United States) J Cerretani (Canada) A Shamasdin	6^{14}	5
(Netherlands) R Haase (Netherlands) R Wassen	7^{16}	7
