= 2010 Trani Cup – Doubles =

Doubles
- 2010 Trani Cup

Final
- Champions: (Italy) Thomas Fabbiano (Italy) Matteo Trevisan
- Runners-up: (Italy) Daniele Bracciali (Italy) Filippo Volandri
- Score: 6–2, 7–5

Events
Singles	Doubles
← 2009 ·	Trani Cup	· 2011 →

Jamie Delgado and Jamie Murray were the defending champions.
Thomas Fabbiano and Matteo Trevisan won in the final 6–2, 7–5, against Daniele Bracciali and Filippo Volandri.

== Seeds ==
First-seeded pair received a bye from the first round.

1. (Switzerland) Yves Allegro / (United States) James Cerretani (quarterfinals)
2. (Italy) Flavio Cipolla / (Italy) Simone Vagnozzi (first round)
3. (Portugal) Rui Machado / (Portugal) Leonardo Tavares (semifinals)
4. (Italy) Alessandro Motti / (Czech Republic) Jaroslav Pospíšil (first round)

== Draw ==
=== Key ===
- Q = Qualifier
- WC = Wild card
- LL = Lucky loser
- Alt = Alternate
- SE = Special exempt
- PR = Protected ranking
- ITF = ITF entry
- JE = Junior exempt
- w/o = Walkover
- r = Retired
- d = Defaulted
- SR = Special ranking

=== Draw ===
First round
(Italy) D Bracciali (Italy) F Volandri	6	6
(Spain) T Arias (Spain) P Clar-Rosselló	1	4
3	(Portugal) R Machado (Portugal) L Tavares
(Russia) I Andreev (Venezuela) D Souto	w/o
(Italy) S Galvani (Italy) M Viola	3	2
(Argentina) D Hartfield (Spain) D Marrero	6	6
(Italy) F Aldi (Italy) D Giorgini	7	1	[10]
(France) T Cazes-Carrère (France) B Paire	5	6	[12]
(Chile) J Aguilar (Argentina) M Alund	6	6
4	(Italy) A Motti (Czech Republic) J Pospíšil	3	2
(Italy) T Fabbiano (Italy) M Trevisan	6	6
WC	(Italy) F Faggella (Italy) S Lapalombella	1	0
(Serbia) N Ćirić (Montenegro) G Tošić	5	6	[10]
2	(Italy) F Cipolla (Italy) S Vagnozzi	7	4	[6]

Quarterfinals
1	(Switzerland) Y Allegro (United States) J Cerretani	4	6	[2]
(Italy) D Bracciali (Italy) F Volandri	6	1	[10]
3	(Portugal) R Machado (Portugal) L Tavares	6	6
(Argentina) D Hartfield (Spain) D Marrero	3	0
(France) T Cazes-Carrère (France) B Paire	2	2
(Chile) J Aguilar (Argentina) M Alund	6	6
(Italy) T Fabbiano (Italy) M Trevisan	3	7	[11]
(Serbia) N Ćirić (Montenegro) G Tošić	6	5	[9]

Semifinals
(Italy) D Bracciali (Italy) F Volandri	6	6
3	(Portugal) R Machado (Portugal) L Tavares	2	1
(Chile) J Aguilar (Argentina) M Alund	1	4
(Italy) T Fabbiano (Italy) M Trevisan	6	6

Finals
(Italy) D Bracciali (Italy) F Volandri	2	5
(Italy) T Fabbiano (Italy) M Trevisan	6	7
