= 2009 Zucchetti Kos Tennis Cup – Doubles =

Doubles
- 2009 Zucchetti Kos Tennis Cup

Final
- Champions: (United States) James Cerretani (United States) Travis Rettenmaier
- Runners-up: (Australia) Peter Luczak (Italy) Alessandro Motti
- Score: 4–6, 6–3, [11–9]

Events
Singles	Doubles
← 2008 ·	Zucchetti Kos Tennis Cup	· 2010 →

Marco Crugnola and Alessio di Mauro were the defending champions, but only Crugnola tried to defend his title.
He partnered up with Philipp Marx, but they were eliminated in the first round by Leoš Friedl and Lovro Zovko.
James Cerretani and Travis Rettenmaier won in the final 4–6, 6–3, [11–9], against Peter Luczak and Alessandro Motti.

== Seeds ==
1. (Czech Republic) David Škoch / (Slovakia) Igor Zelenay (quarterfinals)
2. (Argentina) Lucas Arnold Ker / (Argentina) Sebastián Prieto (semifinals)
3. (United States) James Cerretani / (United States) Travis Rettenmaier (champions)
4. (Czech Republic) Leoš Friedl / (Croatia) Lovro Zovko (quarterfinals)

== Draw ==
=== Key ===
- Q = Qualifier
- WC = Wild card
- LL = Lucky loser
- Alt = Alternate
- SE = Special exempt
- PR = Protected ranking
- ITF = ITF entry
- JE = Junior exempt
- w/o = Walkover
- r = Retired
- d = Defaulted
- SR = Special ranking

=== Draw ===
First round
1	(Czech Republic) D Škoch (Slovakia) I Zelenay	6	6^{5}	[10]
(United Kingdom) J Delgado (United Kingdom) J Murray	2	7	[5]
WC	(Italy) D Bracciali (Italy) M Navarra	6	7
(Portugal) R Machado (Italy) S Roitman	3	6^{3}
3	(United States) J Cerretani (United States) T Rettenmaier	6	6
WC	(Italy) S Appio (Italy) M Commisso	2	1
(Argentina) B Dabul (Argentina) S Decoud	6	6
WC	(Italy) P Beninca (Italy) L Serena	1	1
(Australia) P Luczak (Italy) A Motti	6	2	[10]
(Czech Republic) L Rosol (Italy) T Tenconi	2	6	[4]
(Italy) M Crugnola (Germany) P Marx	6	3	[18]
4	(Czech Republic) L Friedl (Croatia) L Zovko	4	6	[20]
(Czech Republic) J Hájek (Czech Republic) D Karol	3	2
(Austria) D Köllerer (Belgium) C Rochus	6	6
(Belgium) O Rochus (Russia) D Sitak	4	3
2	(Argentina) L Arnold Ker (Argentina) S Prieto	6	6

Quarterfinals
1	(Czech Republic) D Škoch (Slovakia) I Zelenay	3	6	[6]
WC	(Italy) D Bracciali (Italy) M Navarra	6	4	[10]
3	(United States) J Cerretani (United States) T Rettenmaier	6	3	[10]
(Argentina) B Dabul (Argentina) S Decoud	3	6	[8]
(Australia) P Luczak (Italy) A Motti	7	4	[10]
4	(Czech Republic) L Friedl (Croatia) L Zovko	5	6	[8]
(Austria) D Köllerer (Belgium) C Rochus	2	2
2	(Argentina) L Arnold Ker (Argentina) S Prieto	6	6

Semifinals
WC	(Italy) D Bracciali (Italy) M Navarra	3	7	[7]
3	(United States) J Cerretani (United States) T Rettenmaier	6	5	[10]
(Australia) P Luczak (Italy) A Motti	6	7
2	(Argentina) L Arnold Ker (Argentina) S Prieto	4	6^{4}

Finals
3	(United States) J Cerretani (United States) T Rettenmaier	4	6	[11]
(Australia) P Luczak (Italy) A Motti	6	3	[9]
