= 2010 Siemens Open – Doubles =

Doubles
- 2010 Siemens Open

Final
- Champion: (Brazil) Franco Ferreiro (India) Harsh Mankad
- Runner-up: (Australia) Rameez Junaid (Germany) Philipp Marx
- Score: 6–4, 3–6, [10–7]

Events
Singles	Doubles
- Siemens Open

Lucas Arnold Ker and Máximo González were the defending champions, but chose not to compete this year.
Franco Ferreiro and Harsh Mankad won the final against Rameez Junaid and Philipp Marx 6–4, 3–6, [10–7].

== Seeds ==
1. (Australia) Rameez Junaid / (Germany) Philipp Marx (final)
2. (Brazil) Franco Ferreiro / (India) Harsh Mankad (champions)
3. (France) Olivier Charroin / (Italy) Alessandro Motti (first round)
4. (Uruguay) Marcel Felder / (Argentina) Diego Junqueira (semifinals)

== Main draw ==
Key

- Q = Qualifier
- WC = Wild card
- LL = Lucky loser
- Alt = Alternate
- ITF = ITF entry
- PR = Protected ranking
- SR = Special ranking
- SE = Special exempt
- JE = Junior exempt
- JR = Junior Accelerator Programme entrant
- CO = College Accelerator Programme entrant
- NG = Next Gen Accelerator Program entrant
- w/o = Walkover
- r = Retired
- d = Defaulted

=== Draw ===
First round
1	(Australia) R Junaid (Germany) P Marx	6	6
(Germany) D Gremelmayr (Slovakia) I Klec	2	0
(Brazil) A Ghem (Netherlands) B Westerhof	6
WC	(Netherlands) J Eleveld (Netherlands) J Lupescu	0	r
4	(Uruguay) M Felder (Argentina) D Junqueira	6	2	[10]
(Spain) D Muñoz-De La Nava (United Kingdom) M Phillips	4	6	[6]
(Netherlands) S Groen (Austria) D Köllerer	6	6
(Netherlands) R Bruggeling (Netherlands) B van der Valk	2	4
(Uruguay) P Cuevas (Netherlands) S Fransen	6	6
WC	(Spain) Ó Hernández (Spain) S Navarro	0	4
(Netherlands) T Schoorel (Netherlands) N van der Meer	6	6
3	(France) O Charroin (Italy) A Motti	4	2
(France) J Dasnières de Veigy (Belgium) Y Mertens	6	2	[2]
WC	(Netherlands) R Groenendaal (Netherlands) B van Monsjou	2	6	[10]
(Serbia) F Krajinović (Croatia) I Zovko	6	4	[4]
2	(Brazil) F Ferreiro (India) H Mankad	4	6	[10]

Quarterfinals
1	(Australia) R Junaid (Germany) P Marx	6	7
(Brazil) A Ghem (Netherlands) B Westerhof	4	5
4	(Uruguay) M Felder (Argentina) D Junqueira	4	6	[10]
(Netherlands) S Groen (Austria) D Köllerer	6	3	[8]
(Uruguay) P Cuevas (Netherlands) S Fransen	6	0	[10]
(Netherlands) T Schoorel (Netherlands) N van der Meer	2	6	[8]
WC	(Netherlands) R Groenendaal (Netherlands) B van Monsjou	2	3
2	(Brazil) F Ferreiro (India) H Mankad	6	6

Semifinals
1	(Australia) R Junaid (Germany) P Marx	6	6
4	(Uruguay) M Felder (Argentina) D Junqueira	2	3
(Uruguay) P Cuevas (Netherlands) S Fransen	2	7	[5]
2	(Brazil) F Ferreiro (India) H Mankad	6	5	[10]

Finals
1	(Australia) R Junaid (Germany) P Marx	4	6	[7]
2	(Brazil) F Ferreiro (India) H Mankad	6	3	[10]
