= 2011 Sporting Challenger – Doubles =

Doubles
- 2011 Sporting Challenger

Final
- Champions: (Austria) Martin Fischer (Austria) Philipp Oswald
- Runners-up: (Slovakia) Martin Kližan (Belarus) Uladzimir Ignatik
- Score: 6–3, 6–4

Events
Singles	Doubles
← 2010 ·	Sporting Challenger	· 2012 →

Carlos Berlocq and Frederico Gil were the defending champions but Gil decided not to participate.
Berlocq played alongside Daniel Muñoz-de la Nava, however they were eliminated by Martin Fischer and Philipp Oswald in the semifinals.

Fischer and Oswald won this event. They claimed the title, defeating Martin Kližan and Uladzimir Ignatik in the final (6–3, 6–4).

== Seeds ==
1. (Argentina) Carlos Berlocq / (Spain) Daniel Muñoz-de la Nava (semifinals)
2. (Italy) Flavio Cipolla / (Italy) Simone Vagnozzi (quarterfinals)
3. (Italy) Alessio di Mauro / (Italy) Alessandro Motti (first round)
4. (Austria) Martin Fischer / (Austria) Philipp Oswald (champions)

== Draw ==
=== Key ===
- Q = Qualifier
- WC = Wild card
- LL = Lucky loser
- Alt = Alternate
- SE = Special exempt
- PR = Protected ranking
- ITF = ITF entry
- JE = Junior exempt
- w/o = Walkover
- r = Retired
- d = Defaulted
- SR = Special ranking

=== Draw ===
First round
1	(Argentina) C Berlocq (Spain) D Muñoz-de la Nava	6	6
WC	(Switzerland) G Bastl (Italy) Alberto Giraudo	4	4
(Ecuador) G Lapentti (Spain) R Ramírez Hidalgo	6	6
WC	(Italy) S Galvani (Italy) Stefano Napolitano	4	3
4	(Austria) M Fischer (Austria) P Oswald	6	6
(Italy) G Naso (Croatia) A Veić	1	2
WC	(Italy) Alessio Giannuzzi (Italy) Alberto Sibona	2	4
(Argentina) D Junqueira (Argentina) Marco Trungelliti	6	6
(Belarus) U Ignatik (Slovakia) M Kližan	7	7
(France) M Gicquel (France) D Guez	5	6^{4}
(Russia) K Kravchuk (Slovakia) A Martin	7	6
3	(Italy) A di Mauro (Italy) A Motti	5	1
(Serbia) N Ćirić (Serbia) D Lajović	5	3
(Spain) J Martí (Spain) A Ramos	7	6
(Spain) D Gimeno-Traver (Spain) I Navarro	2	4
2	(Italy) F Cipolla (Italy) S Vagnozzi	6	6

Quarterfinals
1	(Argentina) C Berlocq (Spain) D Muñoz-de la Nava	7	6^{5}	[13]
(Ecuador) G Lapentti (Spain) R Ramírez Hidalgo	5	7^{7}	[11]
4	(Austria) M Fischer (Austria) P Oswald	6	6
(Argentina) D Junqueira (Argentina) Marco Trungelliti	1	3
(Belarus) U Ignatik (Slovakia) M Kližan	6	3	[10]
(Russia) K Kravchuk (Slovakia) A Martin	3	6	[7]
(Spain) J Martí (Spain) A Ramos	6	3	[10]
2	(Italy) F Cipolla (Italy) S Vagnozzi	0	6	[6]

Semifinals
1	(Argentina) C Berlocq (Spain) D Muñoz-de la Nava	6^{6}	6	[6]
4	(Austria) M Fischer (Austria) P Oswald	7^{7}	3	[10]
(Belarus) U Ignatik (Slovakia) M Kližan	6^{3}	6	[10]
(Spain) J Martí (Spain) A Ramos	7	2	[7]

Final
4	(Austria) M Fischer (Austria) P Oswald	6	6
(Belarus) U Ignatik (Slovakia) M Kližan	3	4
