= Roberto Álvarez (tennis) =

Argentine tennis player

- Full name: Roberto Marcelo Álvarez
- Country (sports): Argentina
- Born: 23 February 1971 (age 54)
- Prize money: $38,841

Singles
- Career record: 0–1
- Highest ranking: No. 288 (12 Aug 2002)

Grand Slam singles results
- Wimbledon: Q1 (1999, 2002)

Doubles
- Highest ranking: No. 241 (26 Aug 2002)

Roberto Marcelo Álvarez (born 23 February 1971) is an Argentine former professional tennis player.

Álvarez competed on tour in the 1990s and early 2000s, reaching a best singles ranking of 288 in the world. His only ATP Tour main draw appearances came at Bordeaux in 1992, where he lost in the first round to the eighth-seed Fabrice Santoro. He featured twice in the singles qualifying draw at Wimbledon and in 2002 won an ATP Challenger doubles titles in Trani. Following his retirement he coached French tennis player Florent Serra.

== Challenger/Futures titles ==
Legend
ITF Futures (3)

=== Singles: (3) ===
No.	Date	Tournament	Tier	Surface	Opponents	Score
1.	Oct 1998	Argentina F3, Santa Fe	Futures	Clay	(Argentina) Miguel Pastura	7–6, 1–0 ret.
2.	Oct 1998	Argentina F4, Resistencia	Futures	Clay	(Argentina) Guillermo Coria	6–4, 6–1
3.	Sep 2001	Korea F3, Cheongju	Futures	Clay	(Germany) Denis Gremelmayr	6-7^{(3)}, 6-1, 7-5

=== Doubles: (5) ===
Legend
ATP Challenger (1)
ITF Futures (4)

No.	Date	Tournament	Tier	Surface	Partner	Opponents	Score
1.	Jul 1998	France F3, Aix-les-Bains	Futures	Clay	(Argentina) Pablo Bianchi	(Czech Republic) Michal Muzikant (Mauritius) Kamil Patel	6–4, 6–2
2.	Jul 2001	Romania F3, Brașov	Futures	Clay	(France) Jordane Doble	(Romania) Marius Calugaru (Romania) Remus Farcas	6–2, 2–6, 7–6^{(9)}
3.	Sep 2001	Korea F4, Cheongju	Futures	Clay	(France) Jordane Doble	(Germany) Alexander Flock (Germany) Frank Moser	6–4, 4–6, 6–2
4.	Jan 2002	France F1, Grasse	Futures	Clay	(France) Jordane Doble	(France) Christophe De Veaux (France) Nicolas Devilder	6–4, 6–4
1.	Aug 2002	Trani Cup, Trani	Challenger	Clay	(Argentina) Mariano Delfino	(Argentina) Francisco Cabello (Brazil) Francisco Costa	4–6, 6–4, 6–2
