= 2010 Siemens Open – Singles =

Singles
- 2010 Siemens Open

Final
- Champion: (Germany) Denis Gremelmayr
- Runner-up: (Netherlands) Thomas Schoorel
- Score: 7–5, 6–4
- Date: 5-11 July 2010

Events
Singles	Doubles
- Siemens Open

The 2010 Siemens Open singles competition was a Singles tennis tournament hosted in Scheveningen, Netherlands. It was part of the wider 2010 Siemens Open, sponsored by Siemens.

Kristof Vliegen was the defending champion; however, he chose to not play that year. Denis Gremelmayr defeated Thomas Schoorel in the final 7–5, 6–4. The winner received a prize of €6,150 out of a total prize pool of €42,500. There were eight seeded players and six players who qualified through a qualifying competition, including two as lucky losers.

== Seeds ==
1. (Uruguay) Pablo Cuevas (second round)
2. (Australia) Peter Luczak (second round)
3. (Austria) Daniel Köllerer (first round)
4. (Spain) Óscar Hernández (first round)
5. (Germany) Tobias Kamke (quarterfinals)
6. (Belgium) Steve Darcis (semifinals, retired)
7. (Kazakhstan) Yuri Schukin (semifinals)
8. (Brazil) Júlio Silva (second round)

== Prizes ==
Prizes Awarded
Highest Position	Prize money (€)	Tour Points
Winner	6,150	90
Finalist	3,600	55
Semi-Finalist	2,130	33
Quarter-Finalist	1,245	17
2nd round	730	8
1st round	440	0

== Draw ==
Key

- Q = Qualifier
- WC = Wild card
- LL = Lucky loser
- Alt = Alternate
- ITF = ITF entry
- PR = Protected ranking
- SR = Special ranking
- SE = Special exempt
- JE = Junior exempt
- JR = Junior Accelerator Programme entrant
- CO = College Accelerator Programme entrant
- NG = Next Gen Accelerator Program entrant
- w/o = Walkover
- r = Retired
- d = Defaulted

=== Finals ===
Semifinals
6	(Belgium) Steve Darcis	6	4	0^{r}
(Germany) Denis Gremelmayr	3	6	0
WC	(Netherlands) Thomas Schoorel	6	6
7	(Kazakhstan) Yuri Schukin	0	2

Final
(Germany) Denis Gremelmayr	7	6
WC	(Netherlands) Thomas Schoorel	5	4

=== Top half ===
First round
1	(Uruguay) P Cuevas	6	6
WC	(Netherlands) S Fransen	3	3
Q	(Netherlands) J Smit	6	6
(Argentina) D Junqueira	4	4
(Croatia) R Karanušić	2	2
(Uruguay) M Felder	6	6
Q	(Germany) J-L Struff	1	6	3
6	(Belgium) S Darcis	6	3	6
3	(Austria) D Köllerer	3	3
(Germany) D Gremelmayr	6	6
PR	(Czech Republic) J Vaněk	2	3
(Spain) D Muñoz-De La Nava	6	6
(Slovakia) I Klec	1	0
LL	(Australia) R Junaid	6	6
(Serbia) F Krajinović	6	3	3
5	(Germany) T Kamke	3	6	6

Second round
1	(Uruguay) P Cuevas	6	3	6^{6}
Q	(Netherlands) J Smit	3	6	7
(Uruguay) M Felder	2	3
6	(Belgium) S Darcis	6	6
(Germany) D Gremelmayr	6	6^{4}	7
(Spain) D Muñoz-De La Nava	3	7	5
LL	(Australia) R Junaid	2	3
5	(Germany) T Kamke	6	6

Quarterfinals
Q	(Netherlands) J Smit	7	3	4
6	(Belgium) S Darcis	6^{8}	6	6
(Germany) D Gremelmayr	6	6
5	(Germany) T Kamke	2	4

Semifinals
6	(Belgium) S Darcis	6	4	0^{r}
(Germany) D Gremelmayr	3	6	0

=== Bottom half ===
First round
8	(Brazil) J Silva	1	6	6
(Argentina) G Gaudio	6	2	3
(Belgium) Y Mertens	6	1	3
WC	(Netherlands) T Schoorel	3	6	6
(France) J Dasnieres de Veigy	7	7
Q	(France) N Renavand	6^{6}	6^{9}
(France) A Sidorenko	4	6	7
4	(Spain) Ó Hernández	6	3	6^{0}
7	(Kazakhstan) Y Schukin	6	6
LL	(United Kingdom) M Phillips	3	1
WC	(Netherlands) J Eleveld	6	1	2
(Belgium) K Vliegen	2	6	6
Q	(Brazil) A Ghem	4	6^{2}
(Poland) J Janowicz	6	7
(Italy) S Vagnozzi	4	6	2
2	(Australia) P Luczak	6	4	6

Second round
8	(Brazil) J Silva	5	3
WC	(Netherlands) T Schoorel	7	6
(France) J Dasnieres de Veigy	3	6	1
(France) A Sidorenko	6	1	6
7	(Kazakhstan) Y Schukin	6	0
(Belgium) K Vliegen	4	0^{r}
(Poland) J Janowicz	6	6
2	(Australia) P Luczak	2	1

Quarterfinals
WC	(Netherlands) T Schoorel	6	6
(France) A Sidorenko	4	2
7	(Kazakhstan) Y Schukin	6	7
(Poland) J Janowicz	2	5

Semifinals
WC	(Netherlands) T Schoorel	6	6
7	(Kazakhstan) Y Schukin	0	2
