= Matias O'Neille =

Argentine tennis player

- Country (sports): Argentina
- Born: 21 January 1978 (age 47)
- Plays: Right-handed
- Prize money: $35,047

Singles
- Highest ranking: No. 416 (16 Oct 2000)

Doubles
- Highest ranking: No. 401 (22 Mar 2004)

Matias O'Neille (born 21 January 1978) is an Argentine former professional tennis player.

O'Neille, a player from Buenos Aires, spent most of his professional tennis career competing in satellite and ITF Futures tournaments. He won three Futures doubles titles and also claimed one ATP Challenger title, partnering Mariano Delfino at the Trani Cup in 2003. His best singles ranking was 416 in the world and he was ranked as high as 401 in doubles.

== Challenger/Futures titles ==
Legend
ATP Challenger (1)
ITF Futures (3)

=== Doubles ===
No.	Date	Tournament	Tier	Surface	Partner	Opponents	Score
1.	Dec 2000	Chile F9, Santiago	Futures	Clay	(Argentina) Patricio Rudi	(Argentina) Martín Vassallo Argüello (Argentina) Diego Veronelli	6–4, 1–0 ret.
2.	Oct 2001	Paraguay F1, Asunción	Futures	Clay	(Argentina) Diego Hartfield	(Argentina) Sebastián Decoud (Argentina) Sebastian Uriarte	6–3, 4–6, 7–6^{(7)}
1.	Jul 2003	Trani Cup, Trani, Italy	Challenger	Clay	(Argentina) Mariano Delfino	(Italy) Leonardo Azzaro (Hungary) Gergely Kisgyörgy	6–3, 6–3
3.	Aug 2005	Argentina F8, Buenos Aires	Futures	Clay	(Argentina) Emiliano Redondi	(Argentina) Leandro Migani (Argentina) Horacio Zeballos	6–2, 6–1
