= Francisco Costa (tennis) =

Brazilian tennis player

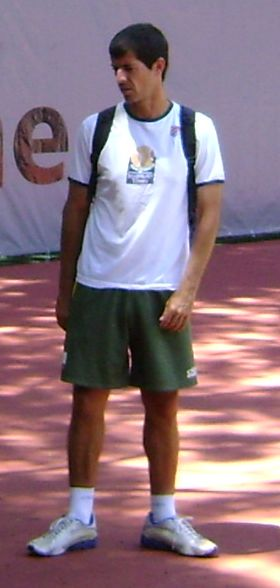
- Country (sports): Brazil
- Residence: Porto Alegre, Brazil
- Born: June 28, 1973 (age 51); Porto Alegre, Brazil
- Height: 1.80 m (5 ft 11 in)
- Turned pro: 1994
- Retired: 2005
- Plays: Right-handed
- Prize money: $305,428

Singles
- Career record: 1–5 (at ATP Tour-level, Grand Slam-level, and in Davis Cup)
- Career titles: 0
- Highest ranking: No. 140 (8 May 2000)

Grand Slam singles results
- Australian Open: Q3 (1999)
- French Open: Q1 (1996, 1997, 1999, 2000, 2001, 2002, 2003)
- Wimbledon: Q1 (2003)
- US Open: Q1 (1999)

Doubles
- Career record: 2–3 (at ATP Tour-level, Grand Slam-level, and in Davis Cup)
- Career titles: 0
- Highest ranking: No. 170 (26 July 1999)
- Last updated on: 25 January 2022.

Francisco Costa (born June 28, 1973) is a former professional tennis player from Brazil.

He is the current captain of the Brazil Davis Cup team.

== ATP Challenger and ITF Futures finals ==
=== Singles: 14 (9–5) ===
Legend ATP Challenger (3–3) ITF Futures (6–2)	Finals by surface Hard (5–1) Clay (4–4) Grass (0–0) Carpet (0–0)

Result	W–L	Date	Tournament	Tier	Surface	Opponent	Score
Loss	0-1	Sep 1997	Budapest, Hungary	Challenger	Clay	(Norway) Jan Frode Andersen	6–7^{(1–7)}, 6–2, 2–6
Win	1-1	Aug 1998	Belo Horizonte, Brazil	Challenger	Hard	(Argentina) Gastón Gaudio	4–6, 6–2, 6–4
Win	2-1	May 1999	Birmingham, United States	Challenger	Clay	(Argentina) Martín Rodríguez	6–7, 7–6, 6–3
Loss	2-2	Jul 1999	Oberstaufen, Germany	Challenger	Clay	(Germany) Alexander Popp	6–7, 3–6
Win	3-2	Nov 1999	Guadalajara, Mexico	Challenger	Clay	(Chile) Nicolás Massú	4–6, 7–5, 6–3
Loss	3-3	Jul 2000	Eisenach, Germany	Challenger	Clay	(Norway) Jan Frode Andersen	6–7^{(5–7)}, 3–6
Loss	3-4	Feb 2003	Jamaica F2, Montego Bay	Futures	Hard	(Netherlands Antilles) Jean-Julien Rojer	6–4, 4–6, 3–6
Win	4-4	Feb 2003	Brazil F1, São Paulo	Futures	Clay	(Argentina) Patricio Arquez	6–1, 6–4
Win	5-4	Feb 2003	Brazil F2, Goiânia	Futures	Hard	(Brazil) Daniel Melo	7–5, 7–5
Win	6-4	Sep 2004	Brazil F7, Fortaleza	Futures	Hard	(Brazil) Alexandre Bonatto	6–4, 3–6, 6–3
Win	7-4	Oct 2004	Brazil F9, Guarulhos	Futures	Clay	(Brazil) Thiago Alves	6–4, 3–6, 6–4
Win	8-4	Oct 2004	Brazil F11, Americana	Futures	Hard	(Brazil) Thiago Alves	6–2, 6–3
Loss	8-5	Nov 2004	Brazil F12, Campinas	Futures	Clay	(Brazil) André Ghem	5–7, 3–6
Win	9-5	Feb 2005	Brazil F1, Caldas Novas	Futures	Hard	(Brazil) Franco Ferreiro	6–0, 3–6, 6–3

=== Doubles: 9 (3–6) ===
Legend ATP Challenger (1–5) ITF Futures (2–1)	Finals by surface Hard (0–2) Clay (3–4) Grass (0–0) Carpet (0–0)

Result	W–L	Date	Tournament	Tier	Surface	Partner	Opponents	Score
Loss	0–1	Sep 1997	São Paulo, Brazil	Challenger	Clay	(Brazil) Márcio Carlsson	(Brazil) Nelson Aerts (Mexico) Bernardo Martínez	0–6, 0–6
Loss	0–2	Aug 1998	Gramado, Brazil	Challenger	Hard	(Japan) Gouichi Motomura	(South Africa) Jeff Coetzee (South Africa) Damien Roberts	5–7, 4–6
Loss	0–3	Jun 2000	Lugano, Switzerland	Challenger	Clay	(Sweden) Tobias Hildebrand	(Uzbekistan) Vadim Kutsenko (Uzbekistan) Oleg Ogorodov	6–4, 6–7^{(3–7)}, 0–6
Loss	0–4	Aug 2000	Monchengladbach, Germany	Challenger	Clay	(Spain) Germán Puentes Alcañiz	(Spain) Emilio Benfele Álvarez (Peru) Luis Horna	6–7^{(1–7)}, 6–1, 5–7
Win	1–4	Nov 2000	Quito, Ecuador	Challenger	Clay	(Georgia (country)) Irakli Labadze	(Argentina) Martin Stringari (United States) Eric Nunez	6–2, 7–6^{(7–4)}
Loss	1–5	Aug 2002	Trani, Italy	Challenger	Clay	(Argentina) Francisco Cabello	(Argentina) Roberto Marcelo Alvarez (Argentina) Mariano Delfino	6–4, 4–6, 2–6
Loss	1–6	Feb 2003	Brazil F2, Goiânia	Futures	Hard	(Argentina) Francisco Cabello	(Brazil) Pedro Braga (Venezuela) Kepler Orellana	6–7^{(2–7)}, 6–7^{(4–7)}
Win	2–6	Aug 2004	Netherlands F4, Alphen aan den Rijn	Futures	Clay	(Belgium) Jeroen Masson	(Jamaica) Dustin Brown (Netherlands) Eric Kuijlen	6–1, 7–6^{(7–3)}
Win	3–6	Sep 2004	Brazil F6, Porto Alegre	Futures	Clay	(Brazil) Thiago Alves	(Brazil) Alexandre Bonatto (Brazil) Daniel Melo	6–4, 7–5

== Performance timeline ==
Key
W	F	SF	QF	#R	RR	Q#	DNQ	A	NH

(W) winner; (F) finalist; (SF) semifinalist; (QF) quarterfinalist; (#R) rounds 4, 3, 2, 1; (RR) round-robin stage; (Q#) qualification round; (DNQ) did not qualify; (A) absent; (NH) not held; (SR) strike rate (events won / competed); (W–L) win–loss record.

=== Singles ===
Tournament	1995	1996	1997	1998	1999	2000	2001	2002	2003	SR	W–L	Win%
Grand Slam tournaments
Australian Open	A	A	A	A	Q3	Q1	Q1	Q1	Q1	0 / 0	0–0	–
French Open	A	Q1	Q1	A	Q1	Q1	Q1	Q1	Q1	0 / 0	0–0	–
Wimbledon	A	A	A	A	A	A	A	A	Q1	0 / 0	0–0	–
US Open	A	A	A	A	Q1	A	A	A	A	0 / 0	0–0	–
Win–loss	0–0	0–0	0–0	0–0	0–0	0–0	0–0	0–0	0–0	0 / 0	0–0	–
ATP World Tour Masters 1000
Miami	Q1	A	A	Q1	A	Q1	A	A	A	0 / 0	0–0	–
Win–loss	0–0	0–0	0–0	0–0	0–0	0–0	0–0	0–0	0–0	0 / 0	0–0	–
