= 2010 Pekao Szczecin Open – Doubles =

Doubles
- 2010 Pekao Szczecin Open

Final
- Champions: (Jamaica) Dustin Brown (Netherlands) Rogier Wassen
- Runners-up: (Australia) Rameez Junaid (Germany) Philipp Marx
- Score: 6–4, 7–5

Events
Singles	Doubles
- Pekao Szczecin Open

Tomasz Bednarek and Mateusz Kowalczyk were the defending champions, but they didn't compete together
Bednarek played with Mischa Zverev and Kowalczyk partnered with Lukáš Rosol, but they lost in the first round.
Dustin Brown and Rogier Wassen defeated Rameez Junaid and Philipp Marx 6–4, 7–5 to win the final.

== Seeds ==
1. (Sweden) Johan Brunström / (Netherlands Antilles) Jean-Julien Rojer (first round)
2. (Czech Republic) Leoš Friedl / (Slovakia) Igor Zelenay (quarterfinals)
3. (Jamaica) Dustin Brown / (Netherlands) Rogier Wassen (champions)
4. (Australia) Rameez Junaid / (Germany) Philipp Marx (final)

== Draw ==
Key

- Q = Qualifier
- WC = Wild card
- LL = Lucky loser
- Alt = Alternate
- ITF = ITF entry
- PR = Protected ranking
- SR = Special ranking
- SE = Special exempt
- JE = Junior exempt
- JR = Junior Accelerator Programme entrant
- CO = College Accelerator Programme entrant
- NG = Next Gen Accelerator Program entrant
- w/o = Walkover
- r = Retired
- d = Defaulted

=== Draw ===
First round
1	(Sweden) J Brunström (Netherlands Antilles) J-J Rojer	6	3	[13]
(United States) B Battistone (Sweden) A Siljeström	1	6	[15]
(Russia) I Andreev (Czech Republic) D Lojda	1	2
(Netherlands) J Huta Galung (Spain) D Muñoz-De La Nava	6	6
3	(Jamaica) D Brown (Netherlands) R Wassen	4	6	[10]
(Australia) J Kerr (United States) T Parrott	6	3	[7]
WC	(Poland) M Gawron (Poland) G Panfil	7	3	[11]
(Poland) M Kowalczyk (Czech Republic) L Rosol	6^{5}	6	[9]
WC	(Poland) R Gozdur (Poland) M Szmigiel	2	4
(Germany) T Kamke (Germany) J Reister	6	6
(United Kingdom) J Delgado (United Kingdom) J Marray	6^{6}	3
4	(Australia) R Junaid (Germany) P Marx	7	6
WC	(Uruguay) M Cuevas (Uruguay) P Cuevas	6	6
(Poland) T Bednarek (Germany) M Zverev	4	2
(India) H Mankad (Germany) F Moser	6	1	[8]
2	(Czech Republic) L Friedl (Slovakia) I Zelenay	1	6	[10]

Quarterfinals
(United States) B Battistone (Sweden) A Siljeström	6	6
(Netherlands) J Huta Galung (Spain) D Muñoz-De La Nava	2	4
3	(Jamaica) D Brown (Netherlands) R Wassen	6	6
WC	(Poland) M Gawron (Poland) G Panfil	3	4
(Germany) T Kamke (Germany) J Reister	3	4
4	(Australia) R Junaid (Germany) P Marx	6	6
WC	(Uruguay) M Cuevas (Uruguay) P Cuevas	6	6
2	(Czech Republic) L Friedl (Slovakia) I Zelenay	2	4

Semifinals
(United States) B Battistone (Sweden) A Siljeström	4	6	[6]
3	(Jamaica) D Brown (Netherlands) R Wassen	6	2	[10]
4	(Australia) R Junaid (Germany) P Marx	6	0	[10]
WC	(Uruguay) M Cuevas (Uruguay) P Cuevas	2	6	[3]

Finals
3	(Jamaica) D Brown (Netherlands) R Wassen	6	7
4	(Australia) R Junaid (Germany) P Marx	4	5
