= Mariano Delfino =

Argentine tennis player

- Country (sports): Argentina
- Born: September 30, 1977 (age 47); Buenos Aires, Argentina
- Height: 6 ft (183 cm)
- Turned pro: 1997
- Plays: Right-handed
- Prize money: $166,157

Singles
- Career record: 0–1
- Career titles: 0
- Highest ranking: No. 154 (19 May 2003)

Grand Slam singles results
- French Open: 1R (2003)

Doubles
- Career record: 1–1
- Career titles: 0
- Highest ranking: No. 123 (23 February 2004)

Mariano Delfino (born 30 September 1977) is a former professional tennis player from Argentina.

== Career ==
Delfino was a qualifier in the 2003 French Open and played against Jean-Rene Lisnard in the first round. He lost the match in four sets.

His only other appearance on the ATP Tour was in the 2003 Campionati Internazionali di Sicilia, where he and partner Sergio Roitman were doubles wildcard entrants. They won their opening round match over Austrians Julian Knowle and Jürgen Melzer, but lost in the second round to Christophe Rochus and Tom Vanhoudt.

== Challenger titles ==
=== Singles: (3) ===
No.	Year	Tournament	Surface	Opponent	Score
1.	2002	Budapest, Hungary	Clay	(Spain) Quino Muñoz	6–3, 6–7^{(5–7)}, 6–1
2.	2002	Trani, Italy	Clay	(Czech Republic) Jiří Vaněk	6–4, 7–6^{(8–6)}
3.	2004	San Luis Potosí, Mexico	Clay	(Argentina) Sergio Roitman	6–4, 6–4

=== Doubles: (6) ===
No.	Year	Tournament	Surface	Partner	Opponents	Score
1.	2002	Trani, Italy	Clay	(Argentina) Roberto Álvarez	(Argentina) Francisco Cabello (Brazil) Francisco Costa	4–6, 6–4, 6–2
2.	2002	Brindisi, Italy	Clay	(Argentina) Sergio Roitman	(Spain) Marc López (Spain) Salvador Navarro	7–6^{(7–4)}, 6–7^{(3–7)}, 6–4
3.	2003	Weiden, Germany	Clay	(Argentina) Patricio Rudi	(Argentina) Diego del Río (Italy) Tomas Tenconi	6–2, 4–6, 7–6^{(8–6)}
4.	2003	Trani, Italy	Clay	(Argentina) Matias O'Neille	(Italy) Leonardo Azzaro (Hungary) Gergely Kisgyörgy	6–3, 6–3
5.	2003	Barcelona, Spain	Clay	(Spain) Juan Ignacio Carrasco	(Italy) Enzo Artoni (Argentina) Sergio Roitman	7–5, 6–3
6.	2004	Budapest, Hungary	Clay	(Argentina) Juan Pablo Brzezicki	(Argentina) Ignacio González King (Argentina) Juan Pablo Guzmán	2–6, 6–3, 6–2
