= 2010 Siemens Open =

- Date: July 5 – July 11
- Edition: 18th
- Location: Scheveningen, Netherlands

Champions

Singles
- (Germany) Denis Gremelmayr

Doubles
- (Brazil) Franco Ferreiro / (India) Harsh Mankad
- Siemens Open

The 2010 Siemens Open was a professional tennis tournament played on outdoor red clay courts. This was the eleventh edition of the tournament, now called The Hague Open, which is part of the Tretorn SERIE+ of the 2010 ATP Challenger Tour. It took place in Scheveningen, Netherlands between 5 July and 11 July 2010.

== ATP entrants ==
=== Seeds ===
| Nationality | Player | Ranking* | Seeding |
|---|---|---|---|
| URU | Pablo Cuevas | 56 | 1 |
| AUS | Peter Luczak | 83 | 2 |
| AUT | Daniel Köllerer | 110 | 3 |
| ESP | Óscar Hernández | 125 | 4 |
| GER | Tobias Kamke | 126 | 5 |
| BEL | Steve Darcis | 132 | 6 |
| KAZ | Yuri Schukin | 147 | 7 |
| BRA | Júlio Silva | 169 | 8 |

- Rankings are as of June 21, 2010.

=== Other entrants ===
The following players received wildcards into the singles main draw:

- (Netherlands) Justin Eleveld
- (Netherlands) Stephan Fransen
- (Netherlands) Jannick Lupescu
- (Netherlands) Thomas Schoorel

The following players received entry from the qualifying draw:

- (Brazil) André Ghem
- (Australia) Rameez Junaid (as a Lucky Loser)
- (United Kingdom) Morgan Phillips (as a Lucky Loser)
- (France) Nicolas Renavand
- (Netherlands) Jasper Smit
- (Germany) Jan-Lennard Struff

== Champions ==
=== Singles ===
(Germany) Denis Gremelmayr def. (Netherlands) Thomas Schoorel 7–5, 6–4

=== Doubles ===
(Brazil) Franco Ferreiro / (India) Harsh Mankad def. (Australia) Rameez Junaid / (Germany) Philipp Marx 6–4, 3–6, [10–7]
