= 2010 Pekao Szczecin Open =

Tennis tournament

- Date: 13 – 19 September
- Edition: 18th
- Location: Szczecin, Poland

Champions

Singles
- (Uruguay) Pablo Cuevas

Doubles
- (Jamaica) Dustin Brown / (Netherlands) Rogier Wassen
- Pekao Szczecin Open

The 2010 Pekao Szczecin Open was a professional tennis tournament played on outdoor red clay courts. It was the 18th edition of the tournament which is part of the 2010 ATP Challenger Tour. It took place in Szczecin, Poland between 13 and 19 September 2010.

== ATP entrants ==
=== Seeds ===
Nationality	Player	Ranking*	Seeding
POL	Łukasz Kubot	62	1
URU	Pablo Cuevas	88	2
GER	Tobias Kamke	89	3
RUS	~~Teymuraz Gabashvili~~	~~93~~	~~4~~
GER	Julian Reister	106	5
ESP	Pablo Andújar	107	6
CHI	Nicolás Massú	116	7
RUS	Igor Andreev	121	8
JAM	Dustin Brown	122	9

- Rankings are as of August 30, 2010.

=== Other entrants ===
The following players received wildcards into the singles main draw:

- (Poland) Marcin Gawron
- (Poland) Rafał Gozdur
- (Slovakia) Miloslav Mečíř Jr.
- (Poland) Maciej Smoła

The following players received a special entrant into the singles main draw:

- (Germany) Jan-Lennard Struff

The following players received entry from the qualifying draw:

- (Germany) Dennis Blömke
- (France) Nicolas Devilder
- (Czech Republic) Daniel Lustig
- (France) Laurent Rochette (as a Lucky Loser)
- (Germany) Peter Torebko

== Champions ==
=== Singles ===
(Uruguay) Pablo Cuevas def. (Russia) Igor Andreev, 6–1, 6–1

=== Doubles ===
(Jamaica) Dustin Brown / (Netherlands) Rogier Wassen def. (Australia) Rameez Junaid / (Germany) Philipp Marx, 6–4, 7–5
