= Nick van der Meer =

Dutch tennis player (born 1985)

- Country (sports): Netherlands
- Born: 18 January 1985 (age 41) Netherlands
- Plays: Right-handed
- Prize money: $78,214

Singles
- Career record: 0–1
- Career titles: 0; 0 Challenger, 7 Futures
- Highest ranking: No. 332 (25 June 2012)

Doubles
- Career record: 0–0
- Career titles: 0; 0 Challenger, 2 Futures
- Highest ranking: No. 444 (19 October 2009)
- Last updated on: 27 May 2021.

Nick van der Meer (born 18 January 1985) is a Dutch retired professional tennis player.

Van der Meer reached a career high ATP singles ranking of World No. 332 achieved on 25 June 2012. He also had a career high ATP doubles ranking of World No. 444 achieved on 19 October 2009.

Van der Meer made his ATP Tour main draw debut in singles at the 2004 Dutch Open held on clay courts in Amersfoort, Netherlands. He received a wild card entry into the first round of the singles draw, where he was defeated by seventh seeded Spaniard Alberto Martín in straight sets 0–6, 4–6.

Van der Meer reached 13 career singles finals with a record of 7 wins and 6 losses all occurring on the ITF Futures circuit. Additionally, he has reached 9 career doubles finals, with a record of 2 wins and 7 losses which includes a 0–1 record in ATP Challenger finals.

== ATP Challenger and ITF Futures finals ==
=== Singles: 13 (7–6) ===
Legend ATP Challenger (0–0) ITF Futures (7–6)	Finals by surface Hard (0–1) Clay (7–5) Grass (0–0) Carpet (0–0)

Result	W–L	Date	Tournament	Tier	Surface	Opponent	Score
Loss	0–1	Nov 2003	Jamaica F13, Kingston	Futures	Hard	(United Kingdom) Alan Mackin	1–6, 4–6
Loss	0–2	Nov 2005	Spain F31, Vilafranca	Futures	Clay	(Spain) Pablo Andújar	6–2, 3–6, 5–7
Loss	0–3	May 2006	Italy F14, Naples	Futures	Clay	(United Kingdom) Morgan Phillips	3–6, 3–6
Win	1–3	Jun 2006	Netherlands F2, Alkmaar	Futures	Clay	(Belgium) Dominique Coene	6–4, 6–4
Loss	1–4	Sep 2006	Netherlands F5, Alphen aan den Rijn	Futures	Clay	(Germany) Gero Kretschmer	5–7, 7–5, 2–6
Win	2–4	Jun 2007	Netherlands F1, Alkmaar	Futures	Clay	(Sweden) Filip Prpic	6–0, 6–4
Win	3–4	Aug 2007	Netherlands F4, Vlaardingen	Futures	Clay	(Netherlands) Matwé Middelkoop	3–6, 6–3, 6–4
Win	4–4	Sep 2007	Netherlands F5, Enschede	Futures	Clay	(Netherlands) Thiemo de Bakker	6–7^{(6–8)}, 7–6^{(7–3)}, 6–2
Loss	4–5	Mar 2008	Morocco F2, Rabat	Futures	Clay	(Romania) Adrian Cruciat	4–6, 1–6
Win	5–5	Aug 2011	Russia F5, Moscow	Futures	Clay	(Russia) Andrey Kumantsov	6–4, 4–6, 6–4
Win	6–5	Oct 2011	Croatia F12, Solin	Futures	Clay	(Slovenia) Aljaž Bedene	3–6, 6–4, 6–2
Win	7–5	Mar 2012	Turkey F10, Antalya	Futures	Clay	(Slovakia) Pavol Červenák	7–6^{(11–9)}, 6–1
Loss	7–6	Jun 2012	Netherlands F1, Zuidwolde	Futures	Clay	(Netherlands) Thiemo de Bakker	4–6, 6–4, 3–6

=== Doubles: 9 (2–7) ===
Legend ATP Challenger (0–1) ITF Futures (2–6)	Finals by surface Hard (0–1) Clay (2–6) Grass (0–0) Carpet (0–0)

Result	W–L	Date	Tournament	Tier	Surface	Partner	Opponents	Score
Loss	0–1	Jan 2005	France F1, Deauville	Futures	Clay	(Netherlands) Steven Korteling	(Belgium) Steve Darcis (Belgium) Stefan Wauters	4–6, 4–6
Loss	0–2	Jun 2006	Netherlands F2, Alkmaar	Futures	Clay	(Netherlands) Romano Frantzen	(Belgium) Dominique Coene (France) Jonathan Dasnieres De Veigy	1–6, 6–2, 6–7^{(5–7)}
Loss	0–3	Sep 2006	Netherlands F5, Alphen aan den Rijn	Futures	Clay	(Netherlands) Michel Koning	(Austria) Daniel Köllerer (Serbia and Montenegro) Petar Popović	2–6, 3–6
Loss	0–4	Sep 2006	Netherlands F6, Enschede	Futures	Clay	(Netherlands) Romano Frantzen	(Chile) Felipe Parada (Netherlands) Michel Koning	1–6, 4–6
Loss	0–5	Sep 2006	France F14, Plaisir	Futures	Hard	(Netherlands) Romano Frantzen	(France) Loic Le Panse (France) Pierrick Ysern	5–7, 6–4, 6–7^{(2–7)}
Win	1–5	Jun 2007	Netherlands F1, Alkmaar	Futures	Clay	(Netherlands) Romano Frantzen	(Belgium) Ruben Bemelmans (Belgium) Yannick Mertens	6–4, 4–6, 6–2
Win	2–5	Oct 2008	Morocco F7, Casablanca	Futures	Clay	(Netherlands) Romano Frantzen	(Morocco) Yassine Idmbarek (Morocco) Anas Fattar	6–3, 6–1
Loss	2–6	May 2009	Italy F8, Valencia	Futures	Clay	(Netherlands) Igor Sijsling	(Slovenia) Andrej Kračman (Argentina) Guillermo Carry	1–6, 6–7^{(1–7)}
Loss	2–7	Jul 2009	Scheveningen, Netherlands	Challenger	Clay	(Netherlands) Thomas Schoorel	(Argentina) Máximo González (Argentina) Lucas Arnold Ker	5–7, 2–6
