= 2010 Sporting Challenger – Singles =

Singles
- 2010 Sporting Challenger

Final
- Champion: (Italy) Simone Bolelli
- Runner-up: (Italy) Potito Starace
- Score: 7–6^{(9–7)}, 6–2

Events
Singles	Doubles
- Sporting Challenger

Potito Starace is the defending champion. Starace lost in the final against Simone Bolelli 6–7^{(7–9)}, 2–6.

== Seeds ==
1. (Italy) Potito Starace (final)
2. (Italy) Andreas Seppi (second round, retired due to illness)
3. (Kazakhstan) Andrey Golubev (second round)
4. (Russia) Teymuraz Gabashvili (second round)
5. (Portugal) Frederico Gil (quarterfinals)
6. (Spain) Daniel Gimeno-Traver (semifinals)
7. (Italy) Paolo Lorenzi (first round)
8. (Brazil) Thiago Alves (first round)

== Draw ==
Key

- Q = Qualifier
- WC = Wild card
- LL = Lucky loser
- Alt = Alternate
- ITF = ITF entry
- PR = Protected ranking
- SR = Special ranking
- SE = Special exempt
- JE = Junior exempt
- JR = Junior Accelerator Programme entrant
- CO = College Accelerator Programme entrant
- NG = Next Gen Accelerator Program entrant
- w/o = Walkover
- r = Retired
- d = Defaulted

=== Finals ===
Semifinals
1/WC	(Italy) Potito Starace	6	4	6
(Argentina) Carlos Berlocq	3	6	3
6	(Spain) Daniel Gimeno-Traver	7	5	3
(Italy) Simone Bolelli	5	7	6

Final
1/WC	(Italy) Potito Starace	6^{7}	2
(Italy) Simone Bolelli	7	6

=== Top half ===
First round
1/WC	(Italy) P Starace	6	6
(Brazil) J Silva	0	2
(Slovenia) B Kavčič	6	6
(France) L Recouderc	2	0
Q	(Italy) G Naso	7	6
WC	(Italy) A Giannessi	5	3
(United States) A Bogomolov Jr.	0	3
5	(Portugal) F Gil	6	6
3	(Kazakhstan) A Golubev	6	7
(Spain) I Navarro	3	6^{6}
(Slovakia) M Kližan	3	3
(Argentina) C Berlocq	6	6
Q	(Italy) M Viola	w/o
Q	(Portugal) P Sousa
LL	(France) C-A Brezac	6	6
8	(Brazil) T Alves	1	1

Second round
1/WC	(Italy) P Starace	6	6
(Slovenia) B Kavčič	4	3
Q	(Italy) G Naso	6	4	3
5	(Portugal) F Gil	4	6	6
3	(Kazakhstan) A Golubev	3	7	0
(Argentina) C Berlocq	6	6^{2}	6
Q	(Portugal) P Sousa	6	2	6^{9}
LL	(France) C-A Brezac	3	6	7

Quarterfinals
1/WC	(Italy) P Starace	6	7
5	(Portugal) F Gil	3	6^{4}
(Argentina) C Berlocq	6	6
LL	(France) C-A Brezac	2	3

Semifinals
1/WC	(Italy) P Starace	6	4	6
(Argentina) C Berlocq	3	6	3

=== Bottom half ===
First round
6	(Spain) D Gimeno-Traver	6	6
(Argentina) D Junqueira	3	1
(Spain) R Ramírez Hidalgo	4	6	6
LL	(Portugal) J Sousa	6	2	2
(Italy) F Volandri	6	6
WC	(Italy) F Cipolla	4	3
(Portugal) R Machado	5	3
4	(Russia) T Gabashvili	7	6
7	(Italy) P Lorenzi	3	3
(Chile) P Capdeville	6	6
(Czech Republic) J Vaněk	6	0	2
(Italy) A di Mauro	4	6	6
(Italy) S Bolelli	6	6
WC	(Italy) T Fabbiano	4	4
Q	(Italy) A Brizzi	4	2
2	(Italy) A Seppi	6	6

Second round
6	(Spain) D Gimeno-Traver	6	6
(Spain) R Ramírez Hidalgo	4	2
(Italy) F Volandri	6	5	6
4	(Russia) T Gabashvili	4	7	3
(Chile) P Capdeville	6	4	4
(Italy) A di Mauro	4	6	6
(Italy) S Bolelli	4	7	4
2	(Italy) A Seppi	6	6^{4}	1^{r}

Quarterfinals
6	(Spain) D Gimeno-Traver	2	6	7
(Italy) F Volandri	6	1	5
(Italy) A di Mauro	3	6	3
(Italy) S Bolelli	6	0	6

Semifinals
6	(Spain) D Gimeno-Traver	7	5	3
(Italy) S Bolelli	5	7	6
