= 2010 Sporting Challenger =

- Date: June 28 – July 4, 2010
- Edition: 9th
- Location: Turin, Italy

Champions

Singles
- (Italy) Simone Bolelli

Doubles
- (Portugal) Frederico Gil / (Argentina) Carlos Berlocq
- Sporting Challenger

The 2010 Sporting Challenger was a professional tennis tournament played on outdoor red clay courts. This was the ninth edition of the tournament which is part of the Tretorn SERIE+ of the 2010 ATP Challenger Tour. It took place in Turin, Italy between 28 June and 4 July 2010.

== Singles main draw entrants ==
=== Seeds ===
Nationality	Player	Ranking*	Seeding
ITA	Potito Starace	58	1
ITA	Andreas Seppi	69	2
KAZ	Andrey Golubev	81	3
RUS	Teymuraz Gabashvili	84	4
POR	Frederico Gil	89	5
ESP	Daniel Gimeno-Traver	91	6
ITA	Paolo Lorenzi	96	7
BRA	Thiago Alves	105	8

- Rankings are as of June 21, 2010.

=== Other entrants ===
The following players received wildcards into the singles main draw:

- (Italy) Flavio Cipolla
- (Italy) Thomas Fabbiano
- (Italy) Alessandro Giannessi
- (Italy) Potito Starace

The following players received entry from the qualifying draw:

- (Italy) Alberto Brizzi
- (Italy) Gianluca Naso
- (Portugal) Pedro Sousa
- (Italy) Matteo Viola

The following players received lucky loser spots:

- (France) Charles-Antoine Brézac
- (Portugal) João Sousa

== Champions ==
=== Singles ===
(Italy) Simone Bolelli def. (Italy) Potito Starace 7–6(7), 6–2

=== Doubles ===
(Argentina) Carlos Berlocq / (Portugal) Frederico Gil def. (Italy) Daniele Bracciali / (Italy) Potito Starace 6–3, 7–6(5)
