= Trani Cup =

ATP Challenger Tour
- Location: Trani, Italy
- Category: ATP Challenger Series
- Surface: Clay / Outdoors
- Draw: 32S/32Q/16D
- Prize money: €30,000
- Website: website

The Trani Cup was a tennis tournament held in Trani, Italy since 2002. The event was part of the ATP Challenger Tour and was played on outdoor red clay courts.

== Past finals ==
=== Singles ===
Year	Champion	Runner-up	Score	Ref.
2012	Tournament not held			
2011	(Belgium) Steve Darcis	(Argentina) Leonardo Mayer	4–6, 6–3, 6–2	
2010	(Netherlands) Jesse Huta Galung	(Italy) Filippo Volandri	7–6, 6-4	
2009	(Austria) Daniel Köllerer	(Italy) Filippo Volandri	6–3, 7–5	
2008	Tournament not held			
2007	(Italy) Flavio Cipolla	(Spain) Pablo Andújar	4–6, 6–2, 6–4	
2006	(Argentina) Juan Pablo Guzmán	(Sweden) Andreas Vinciguerra	6–1, 3–6, 7–6(1)	
2005	(Czech Republic) Lukáš Dlouhý	(Italy) Simone Bolelli	6–4, 6–4	
2004	(Italy) Filippo Volandri	(Italy) Francesco Aldi	6–1, 6–3	
2003	(Argentina) Martín Vassallo Argüello	(Spain) Francisco Fogués	6–3, 7–5	
2002	(Argentina) Mariano Delfino	(Czech Republic) Jiří Vaněk	6–4, 7–6(6)	

=== Doubles ===
Year	Champion	Runner-up	Score
2012	Tournament not held		
2011	(Chile) Jorge Aguilar (Argentina) Andrés Molteni	(Italy) Giulio Di Meo (Italy) Stefano Ianni	6–4, 6–4
2010	(Italy) Matteo Trevisan (Italy) Thomas Fabbiano	(Italy) Daniele Bracciali (Italy) Filippo Volandri	6–3, 7–5
2009	(United Kingdom) Jamie Delgado (United Kingdom) Jamie Murray	(Germany) Simon Greul (Italy) Alessandro Motti	3–6, 6–4, [12–10]
2008	Tournament not held		
2007	(Italy) Leonardo Azzaro (Italy) Daniele Giorgini	(Italy) Fabio Colangelo (Italy) Alessandro Motti	6–2, 7–5
2006	(Italy) Leonardo Azzaro (Italy) Daniele Giorgini	(Spain) Daniel Muñoz-de la Nava (Italy) Alessandro Motti	6–4, 3–6, [10–6]
2005	(Argentina) Carlos Berlocq (Argentina) Cristian Villagrán	(Italy) Giorgio Galimberti (Georgia (country)) Irakli Labadze	4–6, 6–2, 6–4
2004	(Italy) Massimo Bertolini (Spain) Álex López Morón	(Czech Republic) Martin Štěpánek (Czech Republic) Jan Vacek	2–6, 6–4, 6–3
2003	(Argentina) Mariano Delfino (Argentina) Matias O'Neille	(Italy) Leonardo Azzaro (Hungary) Gergely Kisgyörgy	6–3, 6–3
2002	(Argentina) Mariano Delfino (Argentina) Roberto Álvarez	(Brazil) Francisco Costa (Argentina) Francisco Cabello	4–6, 6–4, 6–2
