= Sporting Challenger =

Italian tennis tournament

Defunct tennis tournament
- Event name: Turin
- Location: Turin, Italy
- Venue: Circolo della Stampa
- Category: ATP Challenger Tour, Tretorn SERIE+
- Surface: Clay (red)
- Draw: 32S/16Q/16D
- Prize money: €85,000+H
- Website: www.sporting.to.it

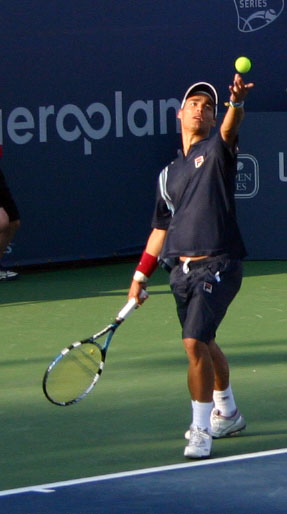
Italian Fabio Fognini, the latest singles champion, beat Argentine Diego Junqueira for the title in 2008

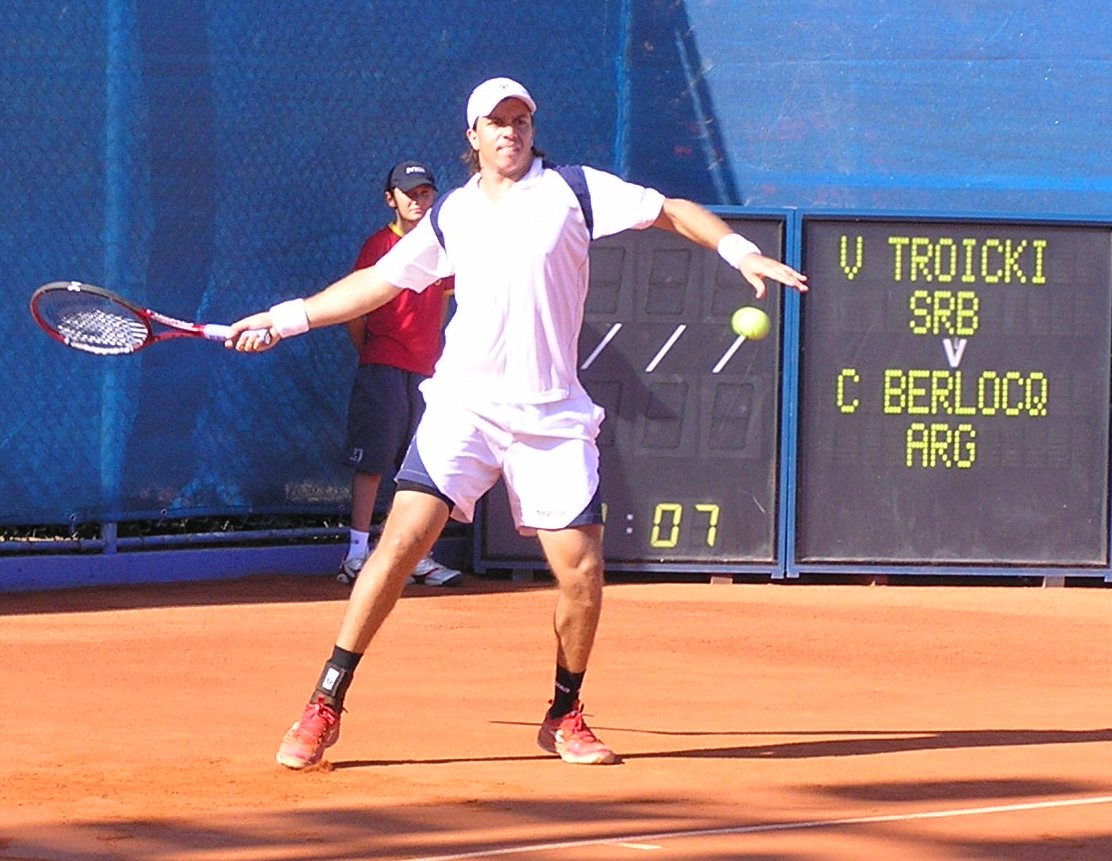
Carlos Berlocq from Argentina won two singles titles in Turin, in 2005 and 2007, and one doubles title in 2008

The Sporting Challenger was a professional tennis tournament played on outdoor red clay courts. It was part of the Association of Tennis Professionals (ATP) Challenger Tour. It was held annually at the Circolo della Stampa in Turin, Italy, from 2002 until 2011.

== Past finals ==
=== Singles ===
| Year | Champion | Runner-up | Score |
|---|---|---|---|
| 2011 | (Argentina) Carlos Berlocq | (Spain) Albert Ramos | 6–4, 6–3 |
| 2010 | (Italy) Simone Bolelli | (Italy) Potito Starace | 7–6(7), 6–2 |
| 2009 | (Italy) Potito Starace | (Argentina) Máximo González | 7–6(4), 6–3 |
| 2008 | (Italy) Fabio Fognini | (Argentina) Diego Junqueira | 6–3, 6–1 |
| 2007 | (Argentina) Carlos Berlocq | (Serbia) Boris Pašanski | 6–4, 6–2 |
| 2006 | (Italy) Flavio Cipolla | (Spain) Marcel Granollers | 6–3, 6–3 |
| 2005 | (Argentina) Carlos Berlocq | (Italy) Alessio di Mauro | 7–5, 6–1 |
| 2004 | (Spain) Álex Calatrava | (Chile) Hermes Gamonal | 5–7, 6–3, 6–2 |
| 2003 | (Spain) Óscar Serrano | (Spain) Joan Albert Viloca | 6–2, 6–2 |
| 2002 | (Netherlands) Martin Verkerk | (Uzbekistan) Vadim Kutsenko | 4–6, 6–4, 6–3 |

=== Doubles ===
| Year | Champions | Runners-up | Score |
|---|---|---|---|
| 2011 | (Austria) Martin Fischer (Austria) Philipp Oswald | (Belarus) Uladzimir Ignatik (Slovakia) Martin Kližan | 6–3, 6–4 |
| 2010 | (Argentina) Carlos Berlocq (Portugal) Frederico Gil | (Italy) Daniele Bracciali (Italy) Potito Starace | 6–3, 7–6(5) |
| 2009 | (Italy) Daniele Bracciali (Italy) Potito Starace | (Colombia) Santiago Giraldo (Spain) Pere Riba | 6–3, 6–4 |
| 2008 | (Argentina) Carlos Berlocq (Portugal) Frederico Gil | (Czech Republic) Tomáš Cibulec (Czech Republic) Jaroslav Levinský | 6–4, 6–3 |
| 2007 | (Uruguay) Pablo Cuevas (Argentina) Horacio Zeballos | (Spain) Pablo Andújar (Brazil) Flávio Saretta | 6–3, 6–1 |
| 2006 | (Spain) Marcel Granollers (Spain) Marc López | (Italy) Leonardo Azzaro (Italy) Flavio Cipolla | 6–4, 6–3 |
| 2005 | (Brazil) Franco Ferreiro (Argentina) Sergio Roitman | (Italy) Francesco Aldi (Italy) Alessio di Mauro | 6–7(7), 7–5, 7–6(2) |
| 2004 | (Italy) Leonardo Azzaro (Italy) Giorgio Galimberti | (Chile) Hermes Gamonal (Chile) Adrián García | 6–1, 6–3 |
| 2003 | (Spain) Emilio Benfele Álvarez (Spain) Gabriel Trujillo Soler | (United States) Jack Brasington (Russia) Dmitry Tursunov | 6–4, 6–2 |
| 2002 | (Romania) Victor Hănescu (Spain) Óscar Hernández | (Russia) Denis Golovanov (Uzbekistan) Vadim Kutsenko | 6–4, 6–3 |
