= Matteo Trevisan =

Italian tennis player (born 1989)

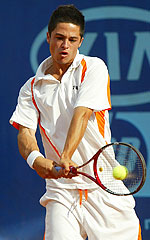
- Trevisan in 2007
- Country (sports): Italy
- Residence: Florence, Italy
- Born: 13 August 1989 (age 36) Florence, Italy
- Height: 1.83 m (6 ft 0 in)
- Plays: Right-handed (two-handed backhand)
- Prize money: $124,230

Singles
- Career record: 0–1
- Career titles: 0
- Highest ranking: No. 267 (18 October 2010)

Grand Slam singles results
- Australian Open: Q1 (2011)

Doubles
- Career record: 0–0
- Career titles: 0
- Highest ranking: No. 341 (3 November 2014)
- Last updated on: 28 May 2021.

Matteo Trevisan (Italian pronunciation: [matˈtɛːo treviˈzan]; born 13 August 1989) is an Italian professional tennis player who was ranked world number one junior player in 2007. Alongside Daniel Alejandro Lopez, he won the Junior Wimbledon doubles title of that year.

Trevisan is the older brother of Martina Trevisan, who is also a tennis player.

== ATP Challenger and ITF Futures finals ==
=== Singles: 13 (8–5) ===
| Legend ATP Challenger (0–1) ITF Futures (8–4) | Finals by surface Hard (1–0) Clay (7–4) Grass (0–0) Carpet (0–1) |

| Result | W–L | Date | Tournament | Tier | Surface | Opponent | Score |
|---|---|---|---|---|---|---|---|
| Loss | 0–1 | Aug 2007 | Italy F25, Imperia | Futures | Clay | (Italy) Alberto Giraudo | 6–3, 3–6, 2–6 |
| Loss | 0–2 | Mar 2010 | Caltanissetta, Italy | Challenger | Clay | (Netherlands) Robin Haase | 5–7, 3–6 |
| Win | 1–2 | Jun 2011 | Italy F13, Parma | Futures | Clay | (Italy) Gianluca Naso | 6–3, 6–4 |
| Loss | 1–3 | Mar 2013 | Italy F1, Trento | Futures | Carpet | (Bosnia and Herzegovina) Mirza Bašić | 6–7^{(4–7)}, 6–1, 2–6 |
| Win | 2–3 | May 2013 | Italy F6, Pozzuoli | Futures | Clay | (Italy) Lorenzo Giustino | 7–5, 6–2 |
| Win | 3–3 | May 2013 | Italy F9, Bergamo | Futures | Clay | (Italy) Thomas Fabbiano | 6–4, 6–4 |
| Loss | 3–4 | Aug 2013 | Italy F21, Appiano | Futures | Clay | (Georgia (country)) Nikoloz Basilashvili | 5–7, 6–3, 4–6 |
| Loss | 3–5 | Apr 2014 | Croatia F7, Pula | Futures | Clay | (Spain) Íñigo Cervantes Huegun | 7–5, 5–7, 1–6 |
| Win | 4–5 | Jun 2014 | Italy F17, Parma | Futures | Clay | (Brazil) Thales Turini | 6–3, 6–3 |
| Win | 5–5 | Aug 2014 | Italy F25, Pontedera | Futures | Clay | (Italy) Francesco Picco | 6–2, 6–1 |
| Win | 6–5 | Mar 2015 | Croatia F4, Poreč | Futures | Clay | (Serbia) Ivan Bjelica | 6–0, 6–2 |
| Win | 7–5 | May 2015 | Italy F10, Bergamo | Futures | Clay | (Italy) Federico Gaio | 6–4, 6–4 |
| Win | 8–5 | Aug 2016 | Italy F26, Piombino | Futures | Hard | (France) Hugo Grenier | 7–5, 6–4 |

=== Doubles: 12 (6–6) ===
| Legend ATP Challenger (1–0) ITF Futures (5–6) | Finals by surface Hard (0–0) Clay (5–5) Grass (0–0) Carpet (1–1) |

| Result | W–L | Date | Tournament | Tier | Surface | Partner | Opponents | Score |
|---|---|---|---|---|---|---|---|---|
| Loss | 0–1 | Aug 2007 | Italy F25, Imperia | Futures | Clay | (Paraguay) Daniel Alejandro López | (Italy) Matteo Marrai (Italy) Walter Trusendi | 2–6, 3–6 |
| Loss | 0–2 | Mar 2010 | Turkey F2, Antalya | Futures | Clay | (Italy) Thomas Fabbiano | (Ukraine) Stanislav Poplavskyy (Ukraine) Artem Smirnov | 6–7^{(4–7)}, 3–6, [6–10] |
| Win | 1–2 | Aug 2010 | Trani, Italy | Challenger | Clay | (Italy) Thomas Fabbiano | (Italy) Filippo Volandri (Italy) Daniele Bracciali | 6–2, 7–5 |
| Win | 2–2 | Mar 2012 | Spain F5, Reus | Futures | Clay | (Italy) Enrico Burzi | (Spain) José Checa Calvo (Spain) Carles Poch Gradin | 3–6, 6–0, [12–10] |
| Loss | 2–3 | Mar 2013 | Switzerland F3, Taverne | Futures | Carpet | (Italy) Lorenzo Frigerio | (Austria) Martin Fischer (Switzerland) Jannis Liniger | 4–6, 6–7^{(4–7)} |
| Win | 3–3 | Mar 2013 | Italy F1, Trento | Futures | Carpet | (Italy) Lorenzo Frigerio | (Italy) Francesco Borgo (Italy) Marco Bortolotti | 6–3, 6–4 |
| Loss | 3–4 | May 2013 | Italy F9, Bergamo | Futures | Clay | (Italy) Matteo Volante | (Chile) Guillermo Hormazábal (Argentina) Andrés Molteni | 2–6, 0–6 |
| Loss | 3–5 | May 2014 | Italy F14, Santa Margherita | Futures | Clay | (Italy) Lorenzo Frigerio | (Italy) Omar Giacalone (Italy) Gianluca Naso | 4–6, 0–6 |
| Win | 4–5 | May 2014 | Italy F15, Bergamo | Futures | Clay | (Italy) Lorenzo Frigerio | (Italy) Marco Crugnola (Italy) Alessandro Motti | 6–4, 6–4 |
| Win | 5–5 | Jun 2014 | Italy F17, Parma | Futures | Clay | (Italy) Lorenzo Frigerio | (United States) Bjorn Fratangelo (United States) Mitchell Krueger | 6–3, 6–2 |
| Win | 6–5 | Jul 2014 | Italy F24, Fano | Futures | Clay | (Italy) Lorenzo Frigerio | (Italy) Francesco Borgo (Italy) Marco Bortolotti | 6–3, 6–2 |
| Loss | 6–6 | Mar 2015 | Croatia F6, Rovinj | Futures | Clay | (Italy) Federico Gaio | (Croatia) Dino Marcan (Croatia) Antonio Šančić | 3–6, 5–7 |

=== Junior Grand Slam finals ===
==== Doubles: 1 (1 title) ====
| Result | Year | Tournament | Surface | Partner | Opponents | Score |
|---|---|---|---|---|---|---|
| Win | 2007 | Wimbledon | Grass | (Paraguay) Daniel Alejandro López | (Czech Republic) Roman Jebavý (Slovakia) Martin Kližan | 7–6^{(7–5)}, 4–6, [10–8] |
