= Daniel Köllerer =

Austrian tennis player

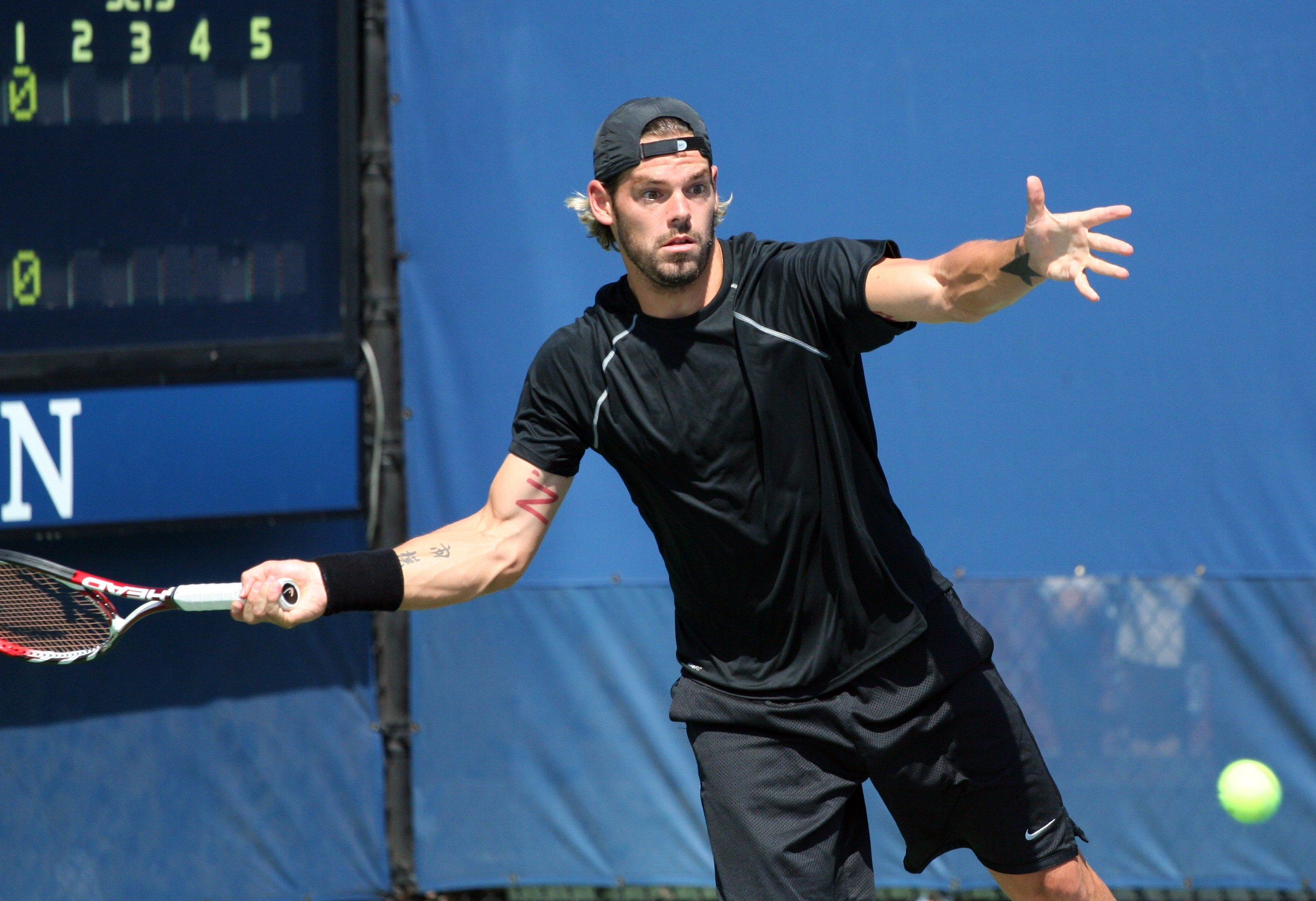
- ITF name: Daniel Koellerer
- Country (sports): Austria
- Residence: Wels, Austria
- Born: 17 August 1983 (age 41); Wels, Austria
- Height: 1.80 m (5 ft 11 in)
- Turned pro: 2002
- Retired: 2011 (banned)
- Plays: Right-handed (two-handed backhand)
- Prize money: $430,086

Singles
- Career record: 19–36
- Career titles: 0
- Highest ranking: No. 55 (19 October 2009)

Grand Slam singles results
- Australian Open: 1R (2010)
- French Open: 1R (2009, 2010)
- Wimbledon: 1R (2009)
- US Open: 3R (2009)

Doubles
- Career record: 3–7
- Career titles: 0
- Highest ranking: No. 87 (9 March 2009)

Grand Slam doubles results
- US Open: 1R (2009)

Daniel Köllerer (German pronunciation: [ˈdaːni̯eːl ˈkœləʁɐ, -ni̯ɛl -]; born 17 August 1983) is a former professional tennis player from Austria who turned professional in 2002 and was given a lifetime ban in 2011 for match fixing.

== Juniors career ==
Köllerer reached a Juniors career high of #23 in singles and #24 in doubles in January, 2001. In 2001, he beat future pros John Isner and Jo-Wilfried Tsonga, split with Mathieu Montcourt, and lost to Brian Dabul, Dudi Sela, Bruno Echagaray (3 times), Philipp Petzschner, Marcos Baghdatis, Adrian Cruciat, and Rajeev Ram. In 2000, he beat future pros Maximillian Abel and Montcourt, split with Echagaray, and lost to Simone Vagnozzi and Florian Mayer.

== Professional career ==
=== Early career through 2002 ===
Köllerer earned his first ranking points as a 16-year-old wild card entry in his first pro tournament, a Futures tournament in Austria in May, 2000, losing to No. 520 Kristian Pless in the quarterfinals. He slipped from the rankings a year later, but began to rise slowly after turning pro in 2002. A Futures championship in Jamaica in November, 2002 helped him end the year ranked No. 640 as a 19-year-old.

=== Into the top-200 in 2003 ===
Köllerer's career progressed well in 2003. He gathered a few ranking points in February on the Spanish Futures circuit, losing twice to 17-year-old Nicolás Almagro. In March, he played in Italy, winning 3 of the 4 weeks while beating Oliver Marach twice, Ilija Bozoljac, and splitting with Florian Mayer, to improve his ranking to No. 384. On the Italian Futures circuit in May, he earned more points, beating Diego Hartfield twice, Santiago Ventura, and Édouard Roger-Vasselin to take his ranking to No. 348.

=== ATP matches ===
His first match win on an ATP Circuit event was over Stefan Koubek in Kitzbühel, before going down to Juan Ignacio Chela in three sets, taking the first. At the time, Chela was ranked 18, Koubek 66 and Köllerer number 169. Köllerer reached the third round of qualifying at the 2007 Australian Open, but lost a tight match to Brian Wilson.

In 2009 Köllerer made the quarter-finals of the Acapulco event defeating David Nalbandian in the first round. He won the Rome Challenger defeating Andreas Vinciguerra in the final, on the Thursday of that week Köllerer's mother died of cancer and "he dedicated the title win to her memory and that she would be certainly proud of me"

Despite a spirited and entertaining performance, Köllerer was defeated in four sets in the third round of the US Open by the #6 seed and eventual champion, Juan Martín del Potro.

== Controversies and life ban ==
Köllerer was accused of racism by Brazilian tennis player Júlio Silva, who filed charges against him after a match on the ATP Challenger Tour at Reggio Emilia, in Italy, in June 2010. Silva accused Köllerer of calling him "monkey" and telling him to "go back to the jungle", imitating monkey movements.

Köllerer also had problems with other players. Stefan Koubek was disqualified from an Austrian league match after grabbing Daniel Köllerer by the throat during a changeover. Koubek said Köllerer had insulted him during the match. "I'm man enough not to let myself be insulted, especially not by him," Koubek was reported as saying by the Austrian Times.

In 2006, the ATP fined and suspended Köllerer for six months for bad behavior. In 2011, Köllerer was banned for life for match fixing and was fined US$100,000 by the Tennis Integrity Unit. This ban was upheld by the Court of Arbitration for Sport in March 2012. However, the court overturned the fined amount as he had not benefited financially from any of the charges for which he had been found liable.

== Equipment ==
Köllerer played with a Head racket.

== Career finals ==
=== Singles titles (9) ===
Legend (singles)
Grand Slam (0)
Tennis Masters Cup (0)
ATP Masters Series (0)
ATP Tour (0)
Challengers (5)
Futures (4)

No.	Date	Tournament	Surface	Opponent in the final	Score
1.	October 28, 2002	Montego Bay, Jamaica F18	Hard	(Federal Republic of Yugoslavia) Darko Mađarovski	6–1, 6–3
2.	July 7, 2003	Telfs, Austria F1	Clay	(Austria) Philipp Müllner	6–1, 6–3
3.	August 4, 2003	Samarkand	Clay	(Russia) Andrei Stoliarov	6–2, 6–3
4.	August 29, 2004	Kyiv	Clay	(Czech Republic) Lukáš Dlouhý	6–0, 3–6, 7–5
5.	June 26, 2006	Iran F1	Clay	(Slovakia) Viktor Bruthans	6–2, 6–4
6.	February 26, 2007	Italy F3	Clay	(Italy) Manuel Jorquera	6–1, 6–1
7.	June 2, 2008	Fürth	Clay	(Colombia) Santiago Giraldo	6–1, 6–3
8.	October 27, 2008	Cali	Clay	(Chile) Paul Capdeville	6–4, 6–3
9.	April 20, 2009	Rome	Clay	(Sweden) Andreas Vinciguerra	6–3, 6–3

=== Singles finals (9) ===
Legend (singles)
Grand Slam (0)
Tennis Masters Cup (0)
ATP Masters Series (0)
ATP Tour (0)
Challengers (6)
Futures (3)

No.	Date	Tournament	Surface	Opponent in the final	Score
1.	May 5, 2003	Valdengo, Italy F6	Clay	(Brazil) Alexandre Simoni	6–1, 6–1
2.	July 14, 2003	Kramsach, Austria F2	Clay	(Austria) Marko Neunteibl	3–6, 6–4, 6–4
3.	April 12, 2004	Olbia	Clay	(Italy) Stefano Pescosolido	6–1, 6–2
4.	August 9, 2004	Cordenons	Clay	(Spain) Daniel Gimeno-Traver	4–6, 6–4, 6–3
5.	October 17, 2005	Bogotá	Clay	(Brazil) Marcos Daniel	6–2, 6–3
6.	July 3, 2006	Iran F2	Clay	(Germany) Alex Satschko	5–2, RET
7.	October 16, 2006	Bogotá	Clay	(Argentina) Diego Hartfield	6–3, 7–5
8.	July 16, 2007	Rimini	Clay	(Austria) Oliver Marach	6–4, 0–2, RET
9.	August 25, 2008	Como	Clay	(Argentina) Diego Junqueira	2–0, RET

== See also ==
- Match fixing in tennis
