= 2010 ATP Salzburg Indoors =

- Date: 15–21 November
- Edition: 2nd
- Location: Salzburg, Austria

Champions

Singles
- (Republic of Ireland) Conor Niland

Doubles
- (Austria) Alexander Peya / (Austria) Martin Slanar
← 2009 ·	ATP Salzburg Indoors	· 2011 →

The 2010 ATP Salzburg Indoors was a professional tennis tournament played on indoor hard courts. It was the second edition of the tournament which is part of the 2010 ATP Challenger Tour and the Tretorn SERIE+ series. It took place in Salzburg, Austria between 15 and 21 November 2010.

== ATP entrants ==
=== Seeds ===
Country	Player	Rank^{1}	Seed
GER	Mischa Zverev	82	1
SVK	Karol Beck	99	2
GER	Björn Phau	104	3
AUT	Andreas Haider-Maurer	116	4
GER	Julian Reister	117	5
AUT	Martin Fischer	124	6
GER	Denis Gremelmayr	133	7
IRL	Conor Niland	156	8

- Rankings are as of November 8, 2010.

=== Other entrants ===
The following players received wildcards into the singles main draw:

- (Austria) Nikolaus Moser
- (Austria) Thomas Muster
- (Austria) Philipp Oswald
- (Austria) Nicolas Reissig

The following player received a Special Exempt into the singles main draw:

- (Germany) Matthias Bachinger

The following players received entry from the qualifying draw:

- (Italy) Riccardo Ghedin
- (Lithuania) Laurynas Grygelis
- (Switzerland) Yann Marti
- (Serbia) Boris Pašanski

== Champions ==
=== Singles ===
(Republic of Ireland) Conor Niland def. (Poland) Jerzy Janowicz, 7–6(5), 6–7(2), 6–3

=== Doubles ===
(Austria) Alexander Peya / (Austria) Martin Slanar def. (Australia) Rameez Junaid / (Germany) Frank Moser, 7–6(1), 6–3
