= 2011 ATP Salzburg Indoors – Singles =

Singles
- 2011 ATP Salzburg Indoors

Final
- Champion: (France) Benoît Paire
- Runner-up: (Slovenia) Grega Žemlja
- Score: 6–7^{(6–8)}, 6–4, 6–4

Events
Singles	Doubles
← 2010 ·	ATP Salzburg Indoors

Conor Niland is the defending champion.
Benoît Paire won the title after defeating Grega Žemlja 6–7^{(6–8)}, 6–4, 6–4 in the final.

== Seeds ==
1. (Slovakia) Karol Beck (semifinals)
2. (France) Nicolas Mahut (quarterfinals)
3. (Germany) Tobias Kamke (withdrew due to shoulder injury)
4. (Italy) Paolo Lorenzi (second round)
5. (France) Benoît Paire (champion)
6. (Japan) Go Soeda (first round)
7. (Slovenia) Grega Žemlja (final)
8. (Austria) Andreas Haider-Maurer (semifinals, retired due to injury)

== Draw ==
=== Key ===
- Q = Qualifier
- WC = Wild card
- LL = Lucky loser
- Alt = Alternate
- SE = Special exempt
- PR = Protected ranking
- ITF = ITF entry
- JE = Junior exempt
- w/o = Walkover
- r = Retired
- d = Defaulted
- SR = Special ranking

=== Finals ===
Semifinals
1	(Slovakia) Karol Beck	6	1	6^{2}
7	(Slovenia) Grega Žemlja	4	6	7^{7}
5	(France) Benoît Paire	6	2
8	(Austria) Andreas Haider-Maurer	2	0^{r}

Final
7	(Slovenia) Grega Žemlja	7^{8}	4	4
5	(France) Benoît Paire	6^{6}	6	6

=== Top half ===
First round
1	(Slovakia) K Beck	7^{7}	6^{3}	6
(Germany) D Meffert	6^{3}	7^{7}	4
(Israel) A Weintraub	6	7^{7}
(Czech Republic) I Minář	3	6^{4}
(Romania) M Copil	6	1	4
Q	(Germany) B Becker	3	6	6
WC	(Austria) M Fischer	6	6
6	(Japan) G Soeda	3	1
4	(Italy) P Lorenzi	7^{7}	6
LL	(Croatia) D Marcan	6^{5}	1
(Argentina) F Delbonis	2	4
(Germany) B Phau	6	6
(Italy) S Galvani	2	5
(Germany) D Brands	6	7
(Slovenia) A Bedene	7^{7}	3	0r
7	(Slovenia) G Žemlja	6^{4}	6	2

Second round
1	(Slovakia) K Beck	6	6
(Israel) A Weintraub	4	4
Q	(Germany) B Becker	6	3	3
WC	(Austria) M Fischer	2	6	6
4	(Italy) P Lorenzi	3	2
(Germany) B Phau	6	6
(Germany) D Brands	2	7^{7}	1
7	(Slovenia) G Žemlja	6	6^{5}	6

Quarterfinals
1	(Slovakia) K Beck	1	7^{7}	6
WC	(Austria) M Fischer	6	6^{5}	4
(Germany) B Phau	6	3	4
7	(Slovenia) G Žemlja	4	6	6

Semifinals
1	(Slovakia) K Beck	6	1	6^{2}
7	(Slovenia) G Žemlja	4	6	7^{7}

=== Bottom half ===
First round
5	(France) B Paire	7^{7}	4	7^{7}
Q	(Germany) J-L Struff	6^{3}	6	6^{4}
(Poland) J Janowicz	6	6
WC	(Austria) D Thiem	1	3
(Spain) I Navarro	1	0
(Republic of Ireland) C Niland	6	6
SE	(Germany) M Zverev	6^{2}	4
Q	(Germany) P Gojowczyk	7^{7}	6
8	(Austria) A Haider-Maurer	6	6
(Czech Republic) J Mertl	3	3
(Germany) D Brown	6	6
(Russia) K Kravchuk	2	1
Q	(Germany) Dennis Blömke	3	6	6
WC	(Austria) T Muster	6	2	3
WC	(Austria) M Neuchrist	1	3
2	(France) N Mahut	6	6

Second round
5	(France) B Paire	7^{8}	2	6
(Poland) J Janowicz	6^{6}	6	3
(Republic of Ireland) C Niland	3	3
Q	(Germany) P Gojowczyk	6	6
8	(Austria) A Haider-Maurer	4	6	6
(Germany) D Brown	6	4	3
Q	(Germany) Dennis Blömke	6^{5}	3
2	(France) N Mahut	7^{7}	6

Quarterfinals
5	(France) B Paire	4	7^{9}	4
Q	(Germany) P Gojowczyk	6	6^{7}	0^{r}
8	(Austria) A Haider-Maurer	4	7^{8}	7^{8}
2	(France) N Mahut	6	6^{6}	6^{6}

Semifinals
5	(France) B Paire	6	2
8	(Austria) A Haider-Maurer	2	0r
