= 2010 Trofeo Paolo Corazzi – Singles =

Singles
- 2010 Trofeo Paolo Corazzi

Final
- Champion: (Germany) Denis Gremelmayr
- Runner-up: (Romania) Marius Copil
- Score: 6–4, 7–5

Events
Singles	Doubles
← 2009 ·	Trofeo Paolo Corazzi	· 2011 →

Benjamin Becker was the defending champion, but he chose not to compete in the 2010 Trofeo Paolo Corazzi.

Denis Gremelmayr won in the final 6–4, 7–5 against Marius Copil.

== Seeds ==
1. (United States) Rajeev Ram (first round)
2. (Jamaica) Dustin Brown (first round)
3. (Japan) Go Soeda (quarterfinals)
4. (Luxembourg) Gilles Müller (first round)
5. (South Africa) Izak van der Merwe (first round)
6. (Spain) Guillermo Olaso (first round)
7. (Austria) Alexander Peya (semifinals)
8. (Spain) Sergio Gutiérrez-Ferrol (first round)

== Draw ==
=== Key ===
- Q = Qualifier
- WC = Wild card
- LL = Lucky loser
- Alt = Alternate
- SE = Special exempt
- PR = Protected ranking
- ITF = ITF entry
- JE = Junior exempt
- w/o = Walkover
- r = Retired
- d = Defaulted
- SR = Special ranking

=== Finals ===
Semifinals
Q	(Romania) Marius Copil	7	3	6
WC	(Australia) Bernard Tomic	5	6	4
Q	(Germany) Denis Gremelmayr	3	6	6
7	(Austria) Alexander Peya	6	2	3

Final
Q	(Romania) Marius Copil	4	5
Q	(Germany) Denis Gremelmayr	6	7

=== Top half ===
First round
1	(United States) R Ram	6^{8}	6	1
(Italy) M Crugnola	7	3	6
LL	(Colombia) JS Cabal	3	4
(United Kingdom) J Baker	6	6
(Argentina) J-P Amado	6	1	2
(Colombia) A González	1	6	6
Q	(Romania) M Copil	6	6
6	(Spain) G Olaso	3	4
3	(Japan) G Soeda	7	7
(United Kingdom) J Goodall	6^{17}	6^{4}
(Denmark) F Nielsen	6	1	1
(Croatia) N Mektić	4	6	6
WC	(Australia) B Tomic	6	7
(Romania) P-A Luncanu	0	6^{2}
(Argentina) G Pella	3	7	7
5	(South Africa) I van der Merwe	6	6	6

Second round
(Italy) M Crugnola	6	6
(United Kingdom) J Baker	3	2
(Colombia) A González	3	2
Q	(Romania) M Copil	6	6
3	(Japan) G Soeda	6	6
(Croatia) N Mektić	2	3
WC	(Australia) B Tomic	7	6
(Argentina) G Pella	6^{2}	2

Quarterfinals
(Italy) M Crugnola	6	3	6^{4}
Q	(Romania) M Copil	4	6	7
3	(Japan) G Soeda	4	3
WC	(Australia) B Tomic	6	6

Semifinals
Q	(Romania) M Copil	7	3	6
WC	(Australia) B Tomic	5	6	4

=== Bottom half ===
First round
8	(Spain) S Gutiérrez-Ferrol	1	6	5
(Romania) C Gârd	6	2	7
Q	(Germany) D Gremelmayr	7	4	7
WC	(Italy) M Trevisan	6^{4}	6	6^{5}
(Argentina) F Bagnis	4	1
WC	(Bulgaria) G Dimitrov	6	6
Q	(Germany) M Bachinger	3	6	7
4	(Luxembourg) G Müller	6	1	6^{2}
7	(Austria) A Peya	1	7	4
WC	(Italy) G Menga	6	6^{5}	0^{r}
(Austria) M Slanar	7	5	6
(Canada) V Pospisil	6^{4}	7	1
Q	(Brazil) R Dutra da Silva	7	7
(South Africa) R de Voest	6^{1}	6^{4}
(Italy) A Stoppini	6	4	6
2	(Jamaica) D Brown	4	6	4

Second round
(Romania) C Gârd	2	6^{3}
Q	(Germany) D Gremelmayr	6	7
WC	(Bulgaria) G Dimitrov	3	5
Q	(Germany) M Bachinger	6	7
7	(Austria) A Peya	6	4	6
(Austria) M Slanar	4	6	2
Q	(Brazil) R Dutra da Silva	6	5	6^{2}
(Italy) A Stoppini	3	7	7

Quarterfinals
Q	(Germany) D Gremelmayr	7	6
Q	(Germany) M Bachinger	6^{5}	3
7	(Austria) A Peya	6^{5}	6	7
(Italy) A Stoppini	7	2	6^{8}

Semifinals
Q	(Germany) D Gremelmayr	3	6	6
7	(Austria) A Peya	6	2	3
