= 2009 Trofeo Paolo Corazzi – Singles =

Singles
- 2009 Trofeo Paolo Corazzi

Final
- Champion: (Germany) Benjamin Becker
- Runner-up: (South Africa) Izak van der Merwe
- Score: 7–6(3), 6–1

Events
Singles	Doubles
← 2008 ·	Trofeo Paolo Corazzi	· 2010 →

Eduardo Schwank was the defending champion, but he chose not to play this year.
Benjamin Becker won in the final 7–6(3), 6–1, against Izak van der Merwe.

== Seeds ==
1. (Germany) Benjamin Becker (champion)
2. (Italy) Andrea Stoppini (second round)
3. (Denmark) Kristian Pless (first round, retired)
4. (Switzerland) Marco Chiudinelli (semifinals)
5. (Slovenia) Blaž Kavčič (second round)
6. (Italy) Stefano Galvani (semifinals)
7. (Denmark) Frederik Nielsen (first round)
8. (Latvia) Deniss Pavlovs (first round)

== Draw ==
=== Key ===
- Q = Qualifier
- WC = Wild card
- LL = Lucky loser
- Alt = Alternate
- SE = Special exempt
- PR = Protected ranking
- ITF = ITF entry
- JE = Junior exempt
- w/o = Walkover
- r = Retired
- d = Defaulted
- SR = Special ranking

=== Final four ===
Semifinals
1	(Germany) Benjamin Becker	7	3	6
4	(Switzerland) Marco Chiudinelli	6^{3}	6	2
6/Q	(Italy) Stefano Galvani	4	1
(South Africa) Izak van der Merwe	6	6

Final
1	(Germany) Benjamin Becker	7	6
(South Africa) Izak van der Merwe	6^{3}	1

=== Top half ===
First round
1	(Germany) B Becker	6	6
WC	(Lithuania) L Grigelis	4	4
SE	(Portugal) L Tavares	4	2
(Poland) D Olejniczak	6	6
(Poland) G Panfil	6^{1}	4
Q	(Bulgaria) G Dimitrov	7	6
(Argentina) L Migani	2	6^{3}
7	(Slovenia) B Kavčič	6	7
4	(Switzerland) M Chiudinelli	6	6
(Netherlands) M Middelkoop	1	2
(Spain) G Olaso	6	3	6
(Chile) G Hormazábal	2	6	1
(United Kingdom) R Bloomfield	7	4
WC	(Italy) M Bosio	5	1	r
(Australia) N Lindahl	5	6	7
8	(Latvia) D Pavlovs	7	3	6^{1}

Second round
1	(Germany) B Becker	6	6
(Poland) D Olejniczak	4	2
Q	(Bulgaria) G Dimitrov	6	6
7	(Slovenia) B Kavčič	4	2
4	(Switzerland) M Chiudinelli	4	6	6
(Spain) G Olaso	6	0	3
(United Kingdom) R Bloomfield	4	4
(Australia) N Lindahl	6	6

Quarterfinals
1	(Germany) B Becker	6	7
Q	(Bulgaria) G Dimitrov	4	5
4	(Switzerland) M Chiudinelli	7	6
(Australia) N Lindahl	5	3

Semifinals
1	(Germany) B Becker	7	3	6
4	(Switzerland) M Chiudinelli	6^{3}	6	2

=== Bottom half ===
First round
6/Q	(Italy) S Galvani	6	7
(Romania) T-D Crăciun	3	6^{5}
WC	(Italy) D Bracciali	4	6	6
Q	(Israel) N Okun	6	3	3
WC	(Italy) G Menga	6	6
(Italy) E Burzi	1	2
(Republic of Ireland) C Niland	6	4
3	(Denmark) K Pless	1	0	r
7	(Denmark) F Nielsen	6	4	1
(Spain) J Checa-Calvo	3	6	6
(South Africa) I van der Merwe	7	6
(Spain) G Alcaide	6^{5}	4
Q	(Germany) P Gojowczyk	4	4
(Czech Republic) J Minář	6	6
(Sweden) F Prpic	3	2
2	(Italy) A Stoppini	6	6

Second round
6/Q	(Italy) S Galvani	2	6	6
WC	(Italy) D Bracciali	6	4	1
WC	(Italy) G Menga	6^{4}	2
(Republic of Ireland) C Niland	7	6
(Spain) J Checa-Calvo	2	3
(South Africa) I van der Merwe	6	6
(Czech Republic) J Minář	6	3	6
2	(Italy) A Stoppini	4	6	3

Quarterfinals
6/Q	(Italy) S Galvani	7	4	7
(Republic of Ireland) C Niland	6^{6}	6	5
(South Africa) I van der Merwe	7	4	7
(Czech Republic) J Minář	5	6	5

Semifinals
6/Q	(Italy) S Galvani	4	1
(South Africa) I van der Merwe	6	6
