= 2011 Trofeo Paolo Corazzi – Doubles =

Doubles
- 2011 Trofeo Paolo Corazzi

Final
- Champions: (Philippines) Treat Conrad Huey (India) Purav Raja
- Runners-up: (Poland) Tomasz Bednarek (Poland) Mateusz Kowalczyk
- Score: 6–1, 6–2

Events
Singles	Doubles
← 2010 ·	Trofeo Paolo Corazzi	· 2012 →

Alexander Peya and Martin Slanar nwere the defending champions, but Peya chose not to participate. Slanar played alongside Karol Beck.
Treat Conrad Huey and Purav Raja won the title, beating Tomasz Bednarek and Mateusz Kowalczyk 6–1, 6–2 in the final.

== Seeds ==
1. (Philippines) Treat Conrad Huey / (India) Purav Raja (champions)
2. (Australia) Jordan Kerr / (Czech Republic) David Škoch (first round)
3. (Slovakia) Karol Beck / (Austria) Martin Slanar (quarterfinals)
4. (South Africa) Jeff Coetzee / (United Kingdom) Ken Skupski (first round)

== Draw ==
=== Key ===
- Q = Qualifier
- WC = Wild card
- LL = Lucky loser
- Alt = Alternate
- SE = Special exempt
- PR = Protected ranking
- ITF = ITF entry
- JE = Junior exempt
- w/o = Walkover
- r = Retired
- d = Defaulted
- SR = Special ranking

=== Draw ===
First round
1	(Philippines) TC Huey (India) P Raja	6	6
(France) O Charroin (Australia) S Kadir	4	2
(United States) B Battistone (Brazil) M Torres	6	6^{5}	[9]
WC	(Italy) Giuseppe Menga (Italy) A Stoppini	4	7	[11]
3	(Slovakia) K Beck (Austria) M Slanar	6	6
WC	(Spain) P Carreño-Busta (Argentina) A Fabbri	4	2
(Croatia) N Mektić (Thailand) Sa Ratiwatana	6	6
(Thailand) So Ratiwatana (France) L Walter	3	3
(Canada) P-L Duclos (New Zealand) J Statham	3	4
(Spain) A Brugués-Davi (Portugal) J Sousa	6	6
(Italy) A Motti (Italy) W Trusendi	6	6
4	(South Africa) J Coetzee (United Kingdom) K Skupski	4	2
(Austria) P Oswald (Germany) A Satschko	5	5
(Poland) T Bednarek (Poland) M Kowalczyk	7	7
(Germany) M Kohlmann (Germany) A Waske	6	7
2	(Australia) J Kerr (Czech Republic) D Škoch	2	6^{3}

Quarterfinals
1	(Philippines) TC Huey (India) P Raja	6	5	[10]
WC	(Italy) Giuseppe Menga (Italy) A Stoppini	0	7	[6]
3	(Slovakia) K Beck (Austria) M Slanar	4	3
(Croatia) N Mektić (Thailand) Sa Ratiwatana	6	6
(Spain) A Brugués-Davi (Portugal) J Sousa	5	6	[10]
(Italy) A Motti (Italy) W Trusendi	7	1	[8]
(Poland) T Bednarek (Poland) M Kowalczyk	6	7
(Germany) M Kohlmann (Germany) A Waske	4	5

Semifinals
1	(Philippines) TC Huey (India) P Raja	6	7
(Croatia) N Mektić (Thailand) Sa Ratiwatana	3	6^{5}
(Spain) A Brugués-Davi (Portugal) J Sousa	4	5
(Poland) T Bednarek (Poland) M Kowalczyk	6	7

Final
1	(Philippines) TC Huey (India) P Raja	6	6
(Poland) T Bednarek (Poland) M Kowalczyk	1	2
