= 2011 ATP Salzburg Indoors =

- Date: 14–20 November
- Edition: 3rd
- Location: Salzburg, Austria

Champions

Singles
- (France) Benoît Paire

Doubles
- (Austria) Martin Fischer / (Austria) Philipp Oswald
← 2010 ·	ATP Salzburg Indoors

The 2011 ATP Salzburg Indoors was a professional tennis tournament played on hard courts. It was the third edition of the tournament which is part of the Tretorn SERIE+ of the 2011 ATP Challenger Tour. It took place in Salzburg, Austria between 14 and 20 November 2011.

== ATP entrants ==
=== Seeds ===
Country	Player	Rank^{1}	Seed
SVK	Karol Beck	94	1
FRA	Nicolas Mahut	95	2
GER	~~Tobias Kamke~~	108	3
ITA	Paolo Lorenzi	109	4
FRA	Benoît Paire	113	5
JPN	Go Soeda	118	6
SVN	Grega Žemlja	124	7
AUT	Andreas Haider-Maurer	127	8

- ^{1} Rankings are as of November 7, 2011.

=== Other entrants ===
The following players received wildcards into the singles main draw:

- (Austria) Martin Fischer
- (Austria) Thomas Muster
- (Austria) Maximilian Neuchrist
- (Austria) Dominic Thiem

The following players received entry as a special exempt into the singles main draw:

- (Germany) Mischa Zverev

The following players received entry as an alternate into the singles main draw:

- (Romania) Marius Copil

The following players received entry from the qualifying draw:

- (Germany) Benjamin Becker
- (Germany) Dennis Blömke
- (Germany) Peter Gojowczyk
- (Germany) Jan-Lennard Struff
- (Croatia) Dino Marcan (Lucky loser)

== Champions ==
=== Singles ===
(France) Benoît Paire def. (Slovenia) Grega Žemlja, 6–7^{(6–8)}, 6–4, 6–4

=== Doubles ===
(Austria) Martin Fischer / (Austria) Philipp Oswald def. (Germany) Alexander Waske / (Croatia) Lovro Zovko, 6–3, 3–6, [14–12]
