= 2010 Trofeo Paolo Corazzi – Doubles =

Doubles
- 2010 Trofeo Paolo Corazzi

Final
- Champion: (Austria) Alexander Peya (Austria) Martin Slanar
- Runner-up: (South Africa) Rik de Voest (South Africa) Izak van der Merwe
- Score: 7–5, 7–5

Events
Singles	Doubles
← 2009 ·	Trofeo Paolo Corazzi	· 2011 →

Colin Fleming and Ken Skupski were the defenders of title; however, they chose to compete in Nice instead.
Alexander Peya and Martin Slanar won in the final 7–5, 7–5 against Rik de Voest and Izak van der Merwe.

== Seeds ==
1. (United States) David Martin / (United States) Rajeev Ram (first round)
2. (United Kingdom) Jonathan Marray / (United Kingdom) Jamie Murray (semifinals)
3. (United States) James Cerretani / (Canada) Adil Shamasdin (first round)
4. (Denmark) Frederik Nielsen / (United States) Travis Rettenmaier (quarterfinals)

== Draw ==
=== Key ===
- Q = Qualifier
- WC = Wild card
- LL = Lucky loser
- Alt = Alternate
- SE = Special exempt
- PR = Protected ranking
- ITF = ITF entry
- JE = Junior exempt
- w/o = Walkover
- r = Retired
- d = Defaulted
- SR = Special ranking

=== Draw ===
First round
1	(United States) D Martin (United States) R Ram	4	4
(Austria) A Peya (Austria) M Slanar	6	6
WC	(Italy) G Menga (Italy) A Stoppini	w/o
(United Kingdom) C Eaton (Australia) B Tomic
3	(United States) J Cerretani (Canada) A Shamasdin	7	5	[7]
(France) O Charroin (France) V Stouff	5	7	[10]
(United Kingdom) J Delgado (United Kingdom) J Goodall	7	3	[6]
WC	(Finland) H Heliövaara (Finland) J Paukku	5	6	[10]
(South Africa) R de Voest (South Africa) I van der Merwe	6	5	[10]
(Italy) D Bracciali (Italy) M Crugnola	4	7	[8]
WC	(Colombia) JS Cabal (Italy) G Naso	3	2
4	(Denmark) F Nielsen (United States) T Rettenmaier	6	6
(Brazil) R Dutra da Silva (Colombia) A González	6	6
(Germany) M Emmrich (Brazil) M Torres	0	2
(Jamaica) D Brown (Italy) A Motti	3	4
2	(United Kingdom) J Marray (United Kingdom) J Murray	6	6

Quarterfinals
(Austria) A Peya (Austria) M Slanar	6	6
(United Kingdom) C Eaton (Australia) B Tomic	3	1
(France) O Charroin (France) V Stouff	5	0
WC	(Finland) H Heliövaara (Finland) J Paukku	7	6
(South Africa) R de Voest (South Africa) I van der Merwe	6	6
4	(Denmark) F Nielsen (United States) T Rettenmaier	2	3
(Brazil) R Dutra da Silva (Colombia) A González	7	4	[8]
2	(United Kingdom) J Marray (United Kingdom) J Murray	6^{3}	6	[10]

Semifinals
(Austria) A Peya (Austria) M Slanar	6	6^{10}	[11]
WC	(Finland) H Heliövaara (Finland) J Paukku	4	7	[9]
(South Africa) R de Voest (South Africa) I van der Merwe	6	7
2	(United Kingdom) J Marray (United Kingdom) J Murray	4	6^{4}

Finals
(Austria) A Peya (Austria) M Slanar	7	7
(South Africa) R de Voest (South Africa) I van der Merwe	5	5
