= 2009 ATP Salzburg Indoors – Singles =

Singles
- 2009 ATP Salzburg Indoors

Final
- Champion: (Germany) Michael Berrer
- Runner-up: (Finland) Jarkko Nieminen
- Score: 6–7(4), 6–4, 6–4

Events
Singles	Doubles
← 2008 ·	ATP Salzburg Indoors	· 2010 →

Michael Berrer became the first champion of this tournament. He defeated Jarkko Nieminen 6–7(4), 6–4, 6–4 in the final match.

== Seeds ==
1. (Israel) Dudi Sela (second round, withdrew)
2. (Germany) Florian Mayer (second round)
3. (Austria) Daniel Köllerer (quarterfinals)
4. (Germany) Philipp Petzschner (quarterfinals)
5. (Germany) Daniel Brands (semifinals)
6. (Poland) Łukasz Kubot (first round)
7. (Germany) Michael Berrer (champion)
8. (Finland) Jarkko Nieminen (final)

== Draw ==
=== Key ===
- Q = Qualifier
- WC = Wild card
- LL = Lucky loser
- Alt = Alternate
- SE = Special exempt
- PR = Protected ranking
- ITF = ITF entry
- JE = Junior exempt
- w/o = Walkover
- r = Retired
- d = Defaulted
- SR = Special ranking

=== Finals ===
Semifinals
7	(Germany) Michael Berrer	6	6
5	(Germany) Daniel Brands	3	2
8	(Finland) Jarkko Nieminen	7	6
(Slovakia) Karol Beck	6^{3}	4

Final
7	(Germany) Michael Berrer	6^{4}	6	6
8	(Finland) Jarkko Nieminen	7	4	4

=== Top half ===
First round
1	(Israel) Dudi Sela	6	5	6
(Czech Republic) Robin Vik	3	7	1
(Belgium) Yannick Mertens	6	6
(Spain) Pere Riba	4	2
(Israel) Harel Levy	6	6
(Austria) Rainer Eitzinger	1	2
(Austria) Philipp Oswald	4	4
7	(Germany) Michael Berrer	6	6
4	(Germany) Philipp Petzschner	6	6
(Austria) Stefan Koubek	4	2
(Netherlands) Igor Sijsling	7	5	3
Q	(Switzerland) Roman Valent	6^{1}	7	6
(Slovenia) Grega Žemlja	6	6
WC	(Austria) Max Raditschnigg	3	2
Q	(Netherlands) Antal van der Duim	6^{4}	3
5	(Germany) Daniel Brands	7	6

Second round
1	(Israel) D Sela
(Belgium) Y Mertens	w/o
(Israel) H Levy
7	(Germany) M Berrer	w/o
4	(Germany) P Petzschner	6	7
Q	(Switzerland) R Valent	0	5
(Slovenia) G Žemlja	6	3	3
5	(Germany) D Brands	3	6	6

Quarterfinals
(Belgium) Y Mertens	3	4
7	(Germany) M Berrer	6	6
4	(Germany) P Petzschner	5	7	6^{9}
5	(Germany) D Brands	7	5	7

Semifinals
7	(Germany) M Berrer	6	6
5	(Germany) D Brands	3	2

=== Bottom half ===
First round
8	(Finland) Jarkko Nieminen	6	6
(Austria) Andreas Haider-Maurer	2	3
SE	(Austria) Martin Fischer	6	6
WC	(Austria) Marco Mirnegg	4	4
(Czech Republic) Lukáš Rosol	2	3
(Jamaica) Dustin Brown	6	6
SE	(Belarus) Uladzimir Ignatik	1	2
3	(Austria) Daniel Köllerer	6	6
6	(Poland) Łukasz Kubot	6^{6}	4
Q	(Australia) Rameez Junaid	7	6
WC	(Austria) Nicolas Reissig	3	3
(Switzerland) Stéphane Bohli	6	6
(Italy) Andrea Stoppini	5	6	3
(Slovakia) Karol Beck	7	4	6
Q	(Croatia) Franko Škugor	2	4
2	(Germany) Florian Mayer	6	6

Second round
8	(Finland) J Nieminen	6	6
(Austria) M Fischer	1	3
(Jamaica) D Brown	6^{3}	6	4
3	(Austria) D Köllerer	7	0	6
Q	(Australia) R Junaid	2	2
(Switzerland) S Bohli	6	6
(Slovakia) K Beck	6	6^{6}	7
2	(Germany) F Mayer	4	7	6^{2}

Quarterfinals
8	(Finland) J Nieminen	6	7
3	(Austria) D Köllerer	2	6
(Switzerland) S Bohli	1	3
(Slovakia) K Beck	6	6

Semifinals
8	(Finland) J Nieminen	7	6
(Slovakia) K Beck	6^{3}	4
