= 2010 ATP Salzburg Indoors – Doubles =

Doubles
- 2010 ATP Salzburg Indoors

Final
- Champions: (Austria) Alexander Peya (Austria) Martin Slanar
- Runners-up: (Australia) Rameez Junaid (Germany) Frank Moser
- Score: 7–6(1), 6–3

Events
Singles	Doubles
← 2009 ·	ATP Salzburg Indoors	· 2011 →

Philipp Marx and Igor Zelenay were the defending champions, but Zelenay did not participate.
Marx partnered with Michael Kohlmann, however they were eliminated by their compatriots Martin Emmrich and Andre Begemann in the quarterfinals.
Alexander Peya and Martin Slanar won in the final 7–6(1), 6–3, over Rameez Junaid and Frank Moser.

== Seeds ==
1. (Germany) Michael Kohlmann / (Germany) Philipp Marx (quarterfinals)
2. (Australia) Rameez Junaid / (Germany) Frank Moser (final)
3. (United Kingdom) Jamie Delgado / (United Kingdom) Jonathan Marray (quarterfinals)
4. (Austria) Alexander Peya / (Austria) Martin Slanar (champions)

== Draw ==
=== Key ===
- Q = Qualifier
- WC = Wild card
- LL = Lucky loser
- Alt = Alternate
- ITF = ITF entry
- PR = Protected ranking
- SR = Special ranking
- SE = Special exempt
- JE = Junior exempt
- JR = Junior Accelerator Programme entrant
- CO = College Accelerator Programme entrant
- NG = Next Gen Accelerator Program entrant
- w/o = Walkover
- r = Retired
- d = Defaulted

=== Draw ===
First round
1	(Germany) Michael Kohlmann (Germany) Philipp Marx	7	6
WC	(Serbia) Nikola Čačić (Bosnia and Herzegovina) Elmar Ejupovic	5	2
WC	(Austria) Richard Ruckelshausen (Austria) Bertram Steinberger	4	1
(Germany) Andre Begemann (Germany) Martin Emmrich	6	6
4	(Austria) Alexander Peya (Austria) Martin Slanar	6	6
(Belgium) Ruben Bemelmans (Belgium) Yannick Mertens	0	1
(Croatia) Dino Marcan (Croatia) Franko Škugor	7	6^{4}	[10]
(Czech Republic) Dušan Lojda (Czech Republic) Ivo Minář	6^{2}	7	[3]
(Austria) Andreas Haider-Maurer (Austria) Nikolaus Moser	6^{5}	6^{3}
(France) Olivier Charroin (Austria) Max Raditschnigg	7	7
(Italy) Riccardo Ghedin (Italy) Claudio Grassi	6	1	[6]
3	(United Kingdom) Jamie Delgado (United Kingdom) Jonathan Marray	4	6	[10]
(Austria) Martin Fischer (Austria) Philipp Oswald	3	r
(Germany) Matthias Bachinger (Greece) Niko Karagiannis	6
WC	(Austria) Thomas Muster (Austria) Nicolas Reissig	3	2
2	(Australia) Rameez Junaid (Germany) Frank Moser	6	6

Quarterfinals
1	(Germany) M Kohlmann (Germany) P Marx	4	6^{5}
(Germany) A Begemann (Germany) M Emmrich	6	7
4	(Austria) A Peya (Austria) M Slanar	6	6
(Croatia) D Marcan (Croatia) F Škugor	2	4
(France) O Charroin (Austria) M Raditschnigg	6	3	[10]
3	(United Kingdom) J Delgado (United Kingdom) J Marray	2	6	[5]
(Germany) M Bachinger (Greece) N Karagiannis	3	7	[5]
2	(Australia) R Junaid (Germany) F Moser	6	5	[10]

Semifinals
(Germany) A Begemann (Germany) M Emmrich	4	6	[7]
4	(Austria) A Peya (Austria) M Slanar	6	3	[10]
(France) O Charroin (Austria) M Raditschnigg	2	6^{6}
2	(Australia) R Junaid (Germany) F Moser	6	7

Final
4	(Austria) A Peya (Austria) M Slanar	7	6
2	(Australia) R Junaid (Germany) F Moser	6^{1}	3
