= 2011 ATP Salzburg Indoors – Doubles =

Doubles
- 2011 ATP Salzburg Indoors

Final
- Champions: (Austria) Martin Fischer (Austria) Philipp Oswald
- Runners-up: (Germany) Alexander Waske (Croatia) Lovro Zovko
- Score: 6–3, 3–6, [14–12]

Events
Singles	Doubles
← 2010 ·	ATP Salzburg Indoors

Alexander Peya and Martin Slanar were the defending champions but decided not to participate.
Martin Fischer and Philipp Oswald won the title, defeating Alexander Waske and Lovro Zovko 6–3, 3–6, [14–12] in the final.

== Seeds ==
1. (Germany) Dustin Brown / (Germany) Björn Phau (semifinals)
2. (Germany) Alexander Waske / (Croatia) Lovro Zovko (final)
3. (Slovakia) Karol Beck / (Germany) Frank Moser (quarterfinals)
4. (India) Purav Raja / (India) Divij Sharan (semifinals)

== Draw ==
=== Key ===
- Q = Qualifier
- WC = Wild card
- LL = Lucky loser
- Alt = Alternate
- SE = Special exempt
- PR = Protected ranking
- ITF = ITF entry
- JE = Junior exempt
- w/o = Walkover
- r = Retired
- d = Defaulted
- SR = Special ranking

=== Draw ===
First round
1	(Germany) D Brown (Germany) B Phau	6	6
(Greece) Niko Karagiannis (Israel) A Weintraub	4	4
(South Africa) Jean Andersen (Republic of Ireland) James Cluskey	6^{5}	4
(Croatia) Marin Draganja (Croatia) Dino Marcan	7^{7}	6
3	(Slovakia) K Beck (Germany) F Moser	6	6
(Poland) A Kapaś (Poland) M Kowalczyk	3	3
(Austria) M Fischer (Austria) P Oswald	7	6
(United Kingdom) D Rice (United Kingdom) S Thornley	5	4
WC	(Austria) Daniel Geib (Austria) Christian Magg	6	3	[6]
(Austria) Maximilian Neuchrist (Austria) Tristan-Samuel Weissborn	2	6	[10]
(Romania) V Anagnastopol (Romania) F Mergea	2	4
4	(India) P Raja (India) D Sharan	6	6
(Slovenia) A Bedene (Slovenia) G Žemlja	w/o
(Czech Republic) J Mertl (Czech Republic) I Minář
(Italy) Enrico Becuzzi (Italy) P Lorenzi	4	2
2	(Germany) A Waske (Croatia) L Zovko	6	6

Quarterfinals
1	(Germany) D Brown (Germany) B Phau	6	6
(Croatia) M Draganja (Croatia) D Marcan	4	4
3	(Slovakia) K Beck (Germany) F Moser	6	4	[7]
(Austria) M Fischer (Austria) P Oswald	4	6	[10]
(Austria) M Neuchrist (Austria) T-S Weissborn	2	2
4	(India) P Raja (India) D Sharan	6	6
(Slovenia) A Bedene (Slovenia) G Žemlja	4	1
2	(Germany) A Waske (Croatia) L Zovko	6	6

Semifinals
1	(Germany) D Brown (Germany) B Phau	6^{5}	7^{7}	[8]
(Austria) M Fischer (Austria) P Oswald	7^{7}	6^{4}	[10]
4	(India) P Raja (India) D Sharan	5	7^{8}	[8]
2	(Germany) A Waske (Croatia) L Zovko	7	6^{6}	[10]

Final
(Austria) M Fischer (Austria) P Oswald	6	3	[14]
2	(Germany) A Waske (Croatia) L Zovko	3	6	[12]
