= 2009 Trofeo Paolo Corazzi – Doubles =

Doubles
- 2009 Trofeo Paolo Corazzi

Final
- Champions: (United Kingdom) Colin Fleming (United Kingdom) Ken Skupski
- Runners-up: (Italy) Daniele Bracciali (Italy) Alessandro Motti
- Score: 6–2, 6–1

Events
Singles	Doubles
← 2008 ·	Trofeo Paolo Corazzi	· 2010 →

Eduardo Schwank and Dušan Vemić were the champions in 2009, but he chose to not defend their title.
Colin Fleming and Ken Skupski won in the final 6–2, 6–1, against Daniele Bracciali and Alessandro Motti.

== Seeds ==
1. (Czech Republic) Dušan Karol / (United States) David Martin (first round)
2. (United Kingdom) Jamie Delgado / (Netherlands) Rogier Wassen (semifinals)
3. (Poland) Tomasz Bednarek / (Poland) Dawid Olejniczak (first round)
4. (Denmark) Frederik Nielsen / (Israel) Noam Okun (first round)

== Draw ==
=== Key ===
- Q = Qualifier
- WC = Wild card
- LL = Lucky loser
- Alt = Alternate
- SE = Special exempt
- PR = Protected ranking
- ITF = ITF entry
- JE = Junior exempt
- w/o = Walkover
- r = Retired
- d = Defaulted
- SR = Special ranking

=== Draw ===
First round
1	(Czech Republic) D Karol (United States) D Martin	4	6^{6}
(Colombia) JS Cabal (Italy) S Galvani	6	7
(Switzerland) Y Allegro (Switzerland) M Chiudinelli	6	6
WC	(Italy) M Bosio (Italy) R Manfredi	1	2
4	(Denmark) F Nielsen (Israel) N Okun	7	1	[8]
(United Kingdom) C Fleming (United Kingdom) K Skupski	6^{7}	6	[10]
(France) O Charroin (Russia) D Sitak	6	4	[6]
WC	(Switzerland) R Maiga (Italy) G Menga	4	6	[10]
(United Kingdom) J Marray (Poland) G Panfil	6	4	[5]
(Italy) D Bracciali (Italy) A Motti	3	6	[10]
(United Kingdom) R Bloomfield (Latvia) D Pavlovs	7	7
3	(Poland) T Bednarek (Poland) D Olejniczak	5	5
(Brazil) M Torres (South Africa) I van der Merwe	6	4	[5]
(Germany) B Becker (Denmark) K Pless	3	6	[10]
WC	(Italy) E Burzi (Italy) C Grassi	4	3
2	(United Kingdom) J Delgado (Netherlands) R Wassen	6	6

Quarterfinals
(Colombia) JS Cabal (Italy) S Galvani	7	4	[6]
(Switzerland) Y Allegro (Switzerland) M Chiudinelli	6^{5}	6	[10]
(United Kingdom) C Fleming (United Kingdom) K Skupski	6	6
WC	(Switzerland) R Maiga (Italy) G Menga	3	1
(Italy) D Bracciali (Italy) A Motti	1	6	[10]
(United Kingdom) R Bloomfield (Latvia) D Pavlovs	6	4	[6]
(Germany) B Becker (Denmark) K Pless	w/o
2	(United Kingdom) J Delgado (Netherlands) R Wassen

Semifinals
(Switzerland) Y Allegro (Switzerland) M Chiudinelli	4	4
(United Kingdom) C Fleming (United Kingdom) K Skupski	6	6
(Italy) D Bracciali (Italy) A Motti	7	6
2	(United Kingdom) J Delgado (Netherlands) R Wassen	6^{7}	4

Finals
(United Kingdom) C Fleming (United Kingdom) K Skupski	6	6
(Italy) D Bracciali (Italy) A Motti	2	1
