= 2009 ATP Salzburg Indoors – Doubles =

Doubles
- 2009 ATP Salzburg Indoors

Final
- Champions: (Germany) Philipp Marx (Slovakia) Igor Zelenay
- Runners-up: (Thailand) Sanchai Ratiwatana (Thailand) Sonchat Ratiwatana
- Score: 6–4, 7–5

Events
Singles	Doubles
← 2008 ·	ATP Salzburg Indoors	· 2010 →

Number 1 seeds Philipp Marx and Igor Zelenay won 6–4, 7–5 in the final against the No. 2 seeds, twins Sanchai and Sonchat Ratiwatana.

== Seeds ==
1. (Germany) Philipp Marx / (Slovakia) Igor Zelenay (champions)
2. (Thailand) Sanchai Ratiwatana / (Thailand) Sonchat Ratiwatana (final)
3. (Finland) Jarkko Nieminen / (Pakistan) Aisam-ul-Haq Qureshi (quarterfinals)
4. (Australia) Rameez Junaid / (Israel) Harel Levy (quarterfinals, withdrew)

== Draw ==
=== Key ===
- Q = Qualifier
- WC = Wild card
- LL = Lucky loser
- Alt = Alternate
- SE = Special exempt
- PR = Protected ranking
- ITF = ITF entry
- JE = Junior exempt
- w/o = Walkover
- r = Retired
- d = Defaulted
- SR = Special ranking

=== Draw ===
First round
1	(Slovakia) Philipp Marx (Slovakia) Igor Zelenay	7	6
WC	(Spain) Emilio Benfele Álvarez (Austria) Gerald Kamitz	6^{4}	4
(Austria) Andreas Haider-Maurer (Austria) Nicolas Reissig	6	4	[3]
(Austria) Gerald Melzer (Germany) Philipp Petzschner	2	6	[10]
4	(Australia) Rameez Junaid (Israel) Harel Levy	6	6
ALT	(Germany) Gero Kretschmer (Austria) Herbert Wiltschnig	3	4
(Austria) Martin Fischer (Austria) Philipp Oswald	6^{3}	6	[3]
(Poland) Mateusz Kowalczyk (Czech Republic) Lukáš Rosol	7	0	[10]
WC	(Croatia) Franko Škugor (Croatia) Ivan Zovko	6	1	[6]
(Switzerland) Yves Allegro (Croatia) Lovro Zovko	3	6	[10]
WC	(Austria) Philip Lang (Austria) Max Raditschnigg	1	6^{3}
3	(Finland) Jarkko Nieminen (Pakistan) Aisam-ul-Haq Qureshi	6	7
(Netherlands) Igor Sijsling (Netherlands) Antal van der Duim	6	6^{2}	[8]
(Austria) Stefan Koubek (Austria) Martin Slanar	4	7	[10]
(Jamaica) Dustin Brown (Czech Republic) Jiří Krkoška	4	6^{4}
2	(Thailand) Sanchai Ratiwatana (Thailand) Sonchat Ratiwatana	6	7

Quarterfinals
1	(Slovakia) P Marx (Slovakia) I Zelenay	6	7
(Austria) G Melzer (Germany) P Petzschner	3	6^{1}
4	(Australia) R Junaid (Israel) H Levy
(Poland) M Kowalczyk (Czech Republic) L Rosol	w/o
(Switzerland) Y Allegro (Croatia) L Zovko	2	6	[10]
3	(Finland) J Nieminen (Pakistan) A-u-H Qureshi	6	2	[6]
(Austria) S Koubek (Austria) M Slanar	4	6	[4]
2	(Thailand) Sa Ratiwatana (Thailand) So Ratiwatana	6	3	[10]

Semifinals
1	(Slovakia) P Marx (Slovakia) I Zelenay	6	7
(Poland) M Kowalczyk (Czech Republic) L Rosol	1	6^{5}
(Switzerland) Y Allegro (Croatia) L Zovko	6^{7}	6^{6}
2	(Thailand) Sa Ratiwatana (Thailand) So Ratiwatana	7	7

Final
1	(Slovakia) P Marx (Slovakia) I Zelenay	6	7
2	(Thailand) Sa Ratiwatana (Thailand) So Ratiwatana	4	5
