= 2011 Trofeo Paolo Corazzi – Singles =

Singles
- 2011 Trofeo Paolo Corazzi

Final
- Champion: (Russia) Igor Kunitsyn
- Runner-up: (Germany) Rainer Schüttler
- Score: 6–2, 7–6(2)

Events
Singles	Doubles
← 2010 ·	Trofeo Paolo Corazzi	· 2012 →

Denis Gremelmayr was the defending champion, but decided not to participate.
Igor Kunitsyn won the title, defeating Rainer Schüttler 6–2, 7–6(2) in the final.

== Seeds ==
1. (Russia) Igor Kunitsyn (champion)
2. (Germany) Rainer Schüttler (final)
3. (Slovakia) Karol Beck (first round)
4. (Australia) Matthew Ebden (semifinals)
5. (Hungary) Ádám Kellner (first round)
6. (Portugal) João Sousa (second round)
7. (Australia) John Millman (first round)
8. (Italy) Stefano Galvani (first round)

== Draw ==
=== Key ===
- Q = Qualifier
- WC = Wild card
- LL = Lucky loser
- Alt = Alternate
- SE = Special exempt
- PR = Protected ranking
- ITF = ITF entry
- JE = Junior exempt
- w/o = Walkover
- r = Retired
- d = Defaulted
- SR = Special ranking

=== Finals ===
Semifinals
1	(Russia) Igor Kunitsyn	4	6	6
(Spain) Pablo Carreño-Busta	6	2	2
4	(Australia) Matthew Ebden	2	2
2	(Germany) Rainer Schüttler	6	6

Final
1	(Russia) Igor Kunitsyn	6	7
2	(Germany) Rainer Schüttler	2	6^{2}

=== Top half ===
First round
1	(Russia) I Kunitsyn	6	6
Q	(United States) P Simmonds	4	3
(United Kingdom) D Evans	5	3
WC	(Italy) Giuseppe Menga	7	6
Q	(Croatia) R Karanušić	6	6
(Croatia) N Mektić	3	2
Alt	(Switzerland) M Lammer	6^{1}	5
6	(Portugal) J Sousa	7	7
3	(Slovakia) K Beck	1	3
(Tunisia) M Jaziri	6	6
WC	(Italy) Federico Gaio	6	6^{3}	2
WC	(Lithuania) L Grigelis	3	7	6
(Czech Republic) J Mertl	4	5
WC	(Italy) W Trusendi	6	7
(Spain) P Carreño-Busta	6	3	7
8	(Italy) S Galvani	3	6	5

Second round
1	(Russia) I Kunitsyn	7	3
WC	(Italy) Giuseppe Menga	6^{3}	0^{r}
Q	(Croatia) R Karanušić	7	3	7
6	(Portugal) J Sousa	6^{4}	6	5
(Tunisia) M Jaziri	7	6
WC	(Lithuania) L Grigelis	5	3
WC	(Italy) W Trusendi	6^{2}	6^{3}
(Spain) P Carreño-Busta	7	7

Quarterfinals
1	(Russia) I Kunitsyn	6	6
Q	(Croatia) R Karanušić	3	2
(Tunisia) M Jaziri	2	1
(Spain) P Carreño-Busta	6	6

Semifinals
1	(Russia) I Kunitsyn	4	6	6
(Spain) P Carreño-Busta	6	2	2

=== Bottom half ===
First round
7	(Australia) J Millman	1	5
(Italy) Andrea Arnaboldi	6	7
(Uzbekistan) F Dustov	3	3
(France) L Walter	6	6
(Germany) Jan-Lennard Struff	2	2
(United Kingdom) D Cox	6	6
Q	(Canada) P-L Duclos	4	4
4	(Australia) M Ebden	6	6
5	(Hungary) Á Kellner	1	3
LL	(Switzerland) A Sadecky	6	6
(Belgium) Y Mertens	3	7	4
(United States) K Kim	6	6^{7}	6
(Netherlands) M Middelkoop	2	2
Q	(United Kingdom) R Bloomfield	6	6
(Spain) A Brugués-Davi	3	1
2	(Germany) R Schüttler	6	6

Second round
(Italy) Andrea Arnaboldi	3	7	7
(France) L Walter	6	6^{5}	6^{0}
(United Kingdom) D Cox	2	5
4	(Australia) M Ebden	6	7
LL	(Switzerland) A Sadecky	6^{3}	6	6
(United States) K Kim	7	3	1
Q	(United Kingdom) R Bloomfield	3	2
2	(Germany) R Schüttler	6	6

Quarterfinals
(Italy) Andrea Arnaboldi	2	2
4	(Australia) M Ebden	6	6
LL	(Switzerland) A Sadecky	3	2
2	(Germany) R Schüttler	6	6

Semifinals
4	(Australia) M Ebden	2	2
2	(Germany) R Schüttler	6	6
