= 2009 ATP Salzburg Indoors =

- Date: 30 November – 6 December
- Edition: 1st
- Location: Salzburg, Austria

Champions

Singles
- (Germany) Michael Berrer

Doubles
- (Germany) Philipp Marx / (Slovakia) Igor Zelenay
ATP Salzburg Indoors	· 2010 →

The 2009 ATP Salzburg Indoors was a professional tennis tournament played on indoor hard courts. It was the first edition of the tournament and was part of the 2009 ATP Challenger Tour. It took place in Salzburg, Austria between 30 November and 6 December 2009.

== Singles main-draw entrants ==
=== Seeds ===
Country	Player	Rank^{1}	Seed
ISR	Dudi Sela	43	1
GER	Florian Mayer	62	2
AUT	Daniel Köllerer	75	3
GER	Philipp Petzschner	81	4
GER	Daniel Brands	98	5
POL	Łukasz Kubot	99	6
GER	Michael Berrer	100	7
FIN	Jarkko Nieminen	112	8

- Rankings are as of November 23, 2009.

=== Other entrants ===
The following players received a Special Exempt into the singles main draw:

- (Austria) Marco Mirnegg
- (Austria) Max Raditschnigg
- (Austria) Nicolas Reissig
- (Israel) Dudi Sela

The following players received wildcards into the singles main draw:

- (Austria) Martin Fischer
- (Belarus) Uladzimir Ignatik

The following players received entry from the qualifying draw:

- (Australia) Rameez Junaid
- (Croatia) Franko Škugor
- (Switzerland) Roman Valent
- (Netherlands) Antal van der Duim

== Champions ==
=== Singles ===
(Germany) Michael Berrer def. (Finland) Jarkko Nieminen, 6–7(4), 6–4, 6–4

=== Doubles ===
(Germany) Philipp Marx / (Slovakia) Igor Zelenay def. (Thailand) Sanchai Ratiwatana / (Thailand) Sonchat Ratiwatana, 6–4, 7–5
