= 2010 Trofeo Paolo Corazzi =

Professional tennis tournament

- Date: May 17 – May 23
- Edition: 7th
- Surface: Hard
- Location: Cremona, Italy

Champions

Singles
- (Germany) Denis Gremelmayr

Doubles
- (Austria) Alexander Peya / (Austria) Martin Slanar
← 2009 ·	Trofeo Paolo Corazzi	· 2011 →

The 2010 Trofeo Paolo Corazzi was a professional tennis tournament played on outdoor hard courts. It was part of the 2010 ATP Challenger Tour. It took place in Cremona, Italy between May 17 and May 23, 2010.

== ATP entrants ==
=== Seeds ===
Nationality	Player	Ranking*	Seeding
USA	Rajeev Ram	90	1
JAM	Dustin Brown	101	2
JPN	Go Soeda	152	3
LUX	Gilles Müller	196	4
RSA	Izak van der Merwe	222	5
ESP	Guillermo Olaso	238	6
AUT	Alexander Peya	240	7
ESP	Sergio Gutiérrez Ferrol	256	8

- Rankings are as of May 10, 2010.

=== Other entrants ===
The following players received wildcards into the singles main draw:

- (Australia) Bernard Tomic
- (Italy) Matteo Trevisan
- (Bulgaria) Grigor Dimitrov
- (Italy) Giuseppe Menga

The following players received entry from the qualifying draw:

- (Romania) Marius Copil
- (Germany) Denis Gremelmayr
- (Germany) Matthias Bachinger
- (Brazil) Rogério Dutra da Silva

== Champions ==
=== Singles ===
(Germany) Denis Gremelmayr def. (Romania) Marius Copil, 6–4, 7–5

=== Doubles ===
(Austria) Alexander Peya / (Austria) Martin Slanar def. (South Africa) Rik de Voest / (South Africa) Izak van der Merwe, 7–5, 7–5
