= 2011 Trofeo Paolo Corazzi =

Professional tennis tournament

- Date: 16–22 May
- Edition: 8th
- Surface: Hard
- Location: Cremona, Italy

Champions

Singles
- (Russia) Igor Kunitsyn

Doubles
- (Philippines) Treat Conrad Huey / (India) Purav Raja
← 2010 ·	Trofeo Paolo Corazzi	· 2012 →

The 2011 Trofeo Paolo Corazzi was a professional tennis tournament played on hard courts. It was the eighth edition of the tournament which was part of the 2011 ATP Challenger Tour. It took place in Cremona, Italy between 16 and 22 May 2011.

== ATP entrants ==
=== Seeds ===
Country	Player	Rank^{1}	Seed
RUS	Igor Kunitsyn	85	1
GER	Rainer Schüttler	100	2
SVK	Karol Beck	128	3
AUS	Matthew Ebden	184	4
HUN	Ádám Kellner	222	5
POR	João Sousa	236	5
AUS	John Millman	251	7
ITA	Stefano Galvani	255	8

- Rankings are as of May 9, 2011.

=== Other entrants ===
The following players received wildcards into the singles main draw:

- (Italy) Federico Gaio
- (Lithuania) Laurynas Grigelis
- (Italy) Giuseppe Menga
- (Italy) Walter Trusendi

The following players received entry from the qualifying draw:

- (United Kingdom) Richard Bloomfield
- (Canada) Pierre-Ludovic Duclos
- (Croatia) Roko Karanušić
- (Switzerland) Alexander Sadecky (as a Lucky loser)
- (United States) Phillip Simmonds

== Champions ==
=== Singles ===
(Russia) Igor Kunitsyn def. (Germany) Rainer Schüttler, 6–2, 7–6(2)

=== Doubles ===
(Philippines) Treat Conrad Huey / (India) Purav Raja def. (Poland) Tomasz Bednarek / (Poland) Mateusz Kowalczyk, 6–1, 6–2
