= 2009 Trofeo Paolo Corazzi =

- Date: May 18 – May 24
- Edition: 6th
- Surface: Hard
- Location: Cremona, Italy

Champions

Singles
- (Germany) Benjamin Becker

Doubles
- (United Kingdom) Colin Fleming / (United Kingdom) Ken Skupski
← 2008 ·	Trofeo Paolo Corazzi	· 2010 →

The 2009 Trofeo Paolo Corazzi was a professional tennis tournament played on outdoor hard courts. It was part of the 2009 ATP Challenger Tour. It took place in Cremona, Italy between May 18 and May 24, 2009.

== Singles entrants ==
=== Seeds ===
Nationality	Player	Ranking*	Seeding
GER	Benjamin Becker	103	1
ITA	Andrea Stoppini	224	2
DEN	Kristian Pless	228	3
SUI	Marco Chiudinelli	239	4
SLO	Blaž Kavčič	243	5
ITA	Stefano Galvani	246	6
DEN	Frederik Nielsen	261	7
LAT	Deniss Pavlovs	273	8

- Rankings are as of May 11, 2009.

=== Other entrants ===
The following players received wildcards into the singles main draw:

- (Italy) Mauro Bosio
- (Italy) Daniele Bracciali
- (Lithuania) Laurynas Grigelis
- (Italy) Giuseppe Menga

The following players received special exempt into the singles main draw:

- (Portugal) Leonardo Tavares

The following players received entry from the qualifying draw:

- (Bulgaria) Grigor Dimitrov
- (Italy) Stefano Galvani
- (Germany) Peter Gojowczyk
- (Israel) Noam Okun

== Champions ==
=== Singles ===
(Germany) Benjamin Becker def. (South Africa) Izak van der Merwe, 7–6(3), 6–1

=== Doubles ===
(United Kingdom) Colin Fleming / (United Kingdom) Ken Skupski def. (Italy) Daniele Bracciali / (Italy) Alessandro Motti, 6–2, 6–1
