= 2010 ATP Salzburg Indoors – Singles =

Singles
- 2010 ATP Salzburg Indoors

Final
- Champion: (Republic of Ireland) Conor Niland
- Runner-up: (Poland) Jerzy Janowicz
- Score: 7–6^{(7–5)}, 6–7^{(2–7)}, 6–3

Events
Singles	Doubles
- ATP Salzburg Indoors

Michael Berrer, the defending champion, did not participate.
No. 8 seed Conor Niland defeated unseeded Jerzy Janowicz 7–6^{(7–5)}, 6–7^{(2–7)}, 6–3 in the final.

== Seeds ==
1. (Germany) Mischa Zverev (second round, retired due to back injury)
2. (Slovakia) Karol Beck (semifinals, withdrew due to right foot injury)
3. (Germany) Björn Phau (semifinals)
4. (Austria) Andreas Haider-Maurer (second round)
5. (Germany) Julian Reister (second round)
6. (Austria) Martin Fischer (first round)
7. (Germany) Denis Gremelmayr (quarterfinals)
8. (Republic of Ireland) Conor Niland (champion)

== Draw ==
Key

- Q = Qualifier
- WC = Wild card
- LL = Lucky loser
- Alt = Alternate
- ITF = ITF entry
- PR = Protected ranking
- SR = Special ranking
- SE = Special exempt
- JE = Junior exempt
- JR = Junior Accelerator Programme entrant
- CO = College Accelerator Programme entrant
- NG = Next Gen Accelerator Program entrant
- w/o = Walkover
- r = Retired
- d = Defaulted

=== Finals ===
Semifinals
(Poland) Jerzy Janowicz	7	6
3	(Germany) Björn Phau	5	4
8	(Republic of Ireland) Conor Niland
2	(Slovakia) Karol Beck	w/o

Final
(Poland) Jerzy Janowicz	6^{5}	7	3
8	(Republic of Ireland) Conor Niland	7	6^{2}	6

=== Top half ===
First round
1	(Germany) Mischa Zverev	2	7	6
(Czech Republic) Dušan Lojda	6	6^{9}	1
(Germany) Dieter Kindlmann	6	6
Q	(Switzerland) Yann Marti	2	3
Q	(Serbia) Boris Pašanski	6^{3}	6^{7}
(Poland) Jerzy Janowicz	7	7
(Slovakia) Pavol Červenák	3	5
5	(Germany) Julian Reister	6	7
3	(Germany) Björn Phau	6	7
(Belarus) Uladzimir Ignatik	4	6^{0}
(Belgium) Ruben Bemelmans	5	5
(Switzerland) Michael Lammer	7	7
(Germany) Andre Begemann	6	6
(Belgium) Yannick Mertens	1	3
(Austria) Alexander Peya	0	6	6
6	(Austria) Martin Fischer	6	2	3

Second round
1	(Germany) M Zverev	1	0	r
(Germany) D Kindlmann	6	1
(Poland) J Janowicz	7	4	7
5	(Germany) J Reister	6^{4}	6	6^{5}
3	(Germany) B Phau	6	6
(Switzerland) M Lammer	3	1
(Germany) A Begemann	7	3	4
(Austria) A Peya	6^{3}	6	6

Quarterfinals
(Germany) D Kindlmann	5	6	3
(Poland) J Janowicz	7	1	6
3	(Germany) B Phau	3	6	6
(Austria) A Peya	6	3	2

Semifinals
(Poland) J Janowicz	7	6
3	(Germany) B Phau	5	4

=== Bottom half ===
First round
8	(Republic of Ireland) Conor Niland	7	6
(Czech Republic) Ivo Minář	6^{5}	3
SE	(Germany) Matthias Bachinger	6	7
(Finland) Henri Kontinen	2	5
WC	(Austria) Nikolaus Moser	4	4
(Spain) Iván Navarro	6	6
WC	(Austria) Thomas Muster	3	1
4	(Austria) Andreas Haider-Maurer	6	6
7	(Germany) Denis Gremelmayr	3	6	6
WC	(Austria) Nicolas Reissig	6	2	4
Q	(Lithuania) Laurynas Grigelis	6^{9}	7	7
(Croatia) Franko Škugor	7	5	6^{5}
Q	(Italy) Riccardo Ghedin	6	4	4
WC	(Austria) Philipp Oswald	3	6	6
(Ukraine) Ivan Sergeyev	6^{5}	5
2	(Slovakia) Karol Beck	7	7

Second round
8	(Republic of Ireland) C Niland	7	4	7
SE	(Germany) M Bachinger	5	6	5
(Spain) I Navarro	5	6	6
4	(Austria) A Haider-Maurer	7	4	4
7	(Germany) D Gremelmayr	6	7
Q	(Lithuania) L Grigelis	3	6^{5}
WC	(Austria) P Oswald	3	3
2	(Slovakia) K Beck	6	6

Quarterfinals
8	(Republic of Ireland) C Niland	7	6
(Spain) I Navarro	5	3
7	(Germany) D Gremelmayr	3	6	2
2	(Slovakia) K Beck	6	4	6

Semifinals
8	(Republic of Ireland) C Niland
2	(Slovakia) K Beck	w/o
