= ATP Salzburg Indoors =

Defunct tennis tournament
- Founded: 2009
- Abolished: 2011
- Location: Salzburg, Austria
- Venue: Salzburgarena
- Category: ATP Challenger Tour, Tretorn SERIE+
- Surface: Hard
- Draw: 32S/17Q/16D
- Prize money: $85,000+H

The ATP Salzburg Indoors was a professional tennis tournament played on indoor hard courts. It was part of the Tretorn SERIE+ of Association of Tennis Professionals (ATP) Challenger Tour. The Challenger Tour would eventually return to Salzburg with the Salzburg Open.

== Past finals ==
=== Singles ===
Year	Champion	Runner-up	Score
2011	(France) Benoît Paire	(Slovenia) Grega Žemlja	6–7^{(6–8)}, 6–4, 6–4
2010	(Republic of Ireland) Conor Niland	(Poland) Jerzy Janowicz	7–6(5), 6–7(2), 6–3
2009	(Germany) Michael Berrer	(Finland) Jarkko Nieminen	6–7(4), 6–4, 6–4

=== Doubles ===
Year	Champions	Runners-up	Score
2011	(Austria) Martin Fischer (Austria) Philipp Oswald	(Germany) Alexander Waske (Croatia) Lovro Zovko	6–3, 3–6, [14–12]
2010	(Austria) Alexander Peya (Austria) Martin Slanar	(Australia) Rameez Junaid (Germany) Frank Moser	7–6(1), 6–3
2009	(Germany) Philipp Marx (Slovakia) Igor Zelenay	(Thailand) Sonchat Ratiwatana (Thailand) Sanchai Ratiwatana	6–4, 7–5
