= Marius Copil =

Romanian tennis player

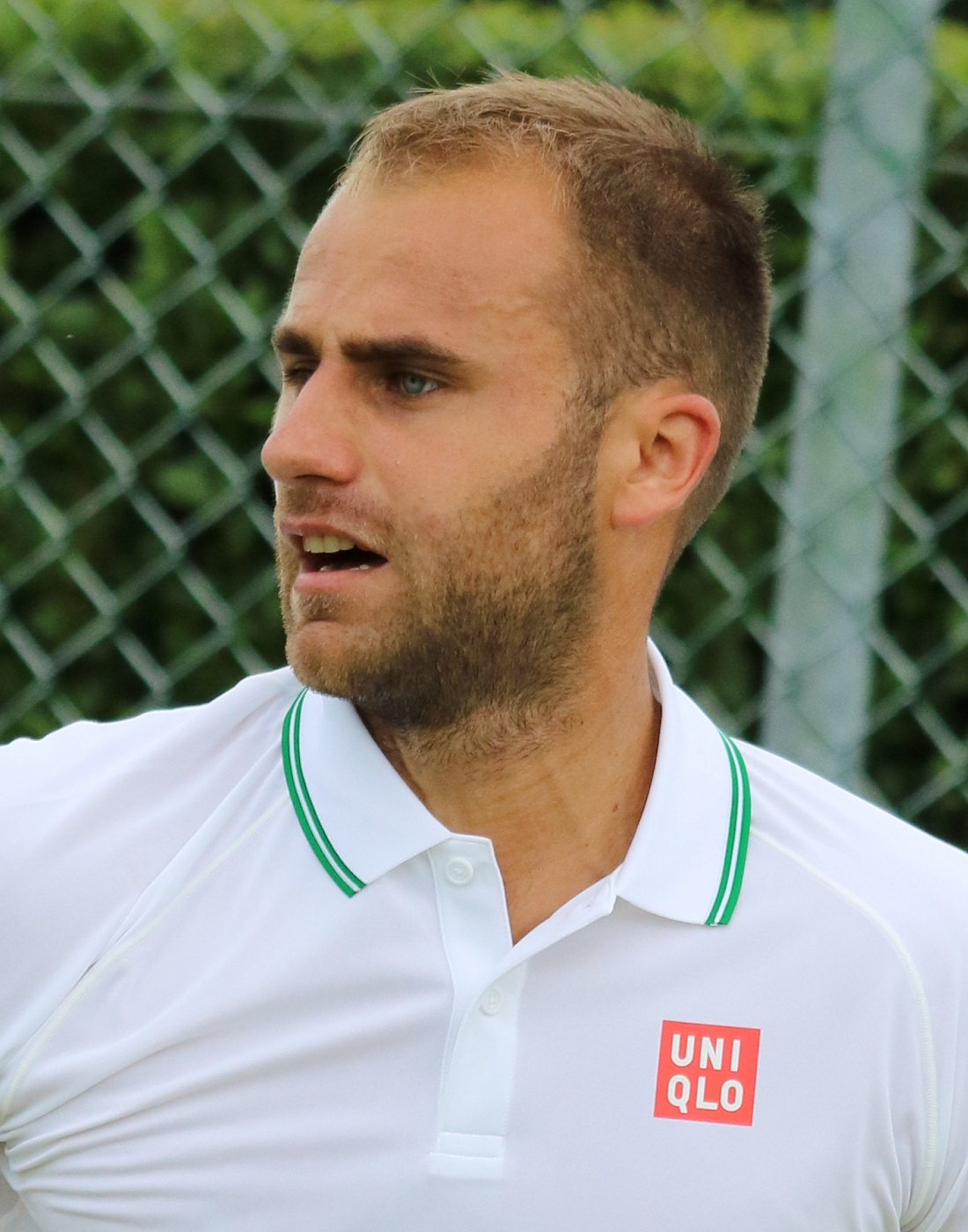
- Copil at the 2016 Wimbledon championships
- Country (sports): Romania
- Residence: Arad, Romania
- Born: 17 October 1990 (age 36) Arad, Romania
- Height: 1.91 m (6 ft 3 in)
- Turned pro: 2008
- Retired: 4 November 2025
- Plays: Right-handed (one-handed backhand)
- Coach: Andrei Pavel (2018-19), Andrei Mlendea (2016-18),, Răzvan Itu (former)
- Prize money: US $2,991,558

Singles
- Career record: 66–95
- Career titles: 0
- Highest ranking: No. 56 (28 January 2019)

Grand Slam singles results
- Australian Open: 2R (2015, 2019)
- French Open: 1R (2017, 2018, 2019)
- Wimbledon: 1R (2016, 2017, 2018, 2019)
- US Open: 2R (2019)

Doubles
- Career record: 17–35
- Career titles: 1
- Highest ranking: No. 182 (24 August 2015)

Grand Slam doubles results
- Australian Open: 1R (2018, 2019)
- French Open: 3R (2019)
- Wimbledon: 1R (2017, 2018, 2021)
- US Open: 2R (2019)

Marius Copil (born 17 October 1990) is a former Romanian professional tennis player. He reached a career-high ATP singles ranking of world No. 56 on 28 January 2019 and a doubles ranking of No. 182 achieved on 24 August 2015. Copil was known for his extremely fast, powerful, and consistent serve. He was a member of the Romanian Davis Cup team.

== Career ==
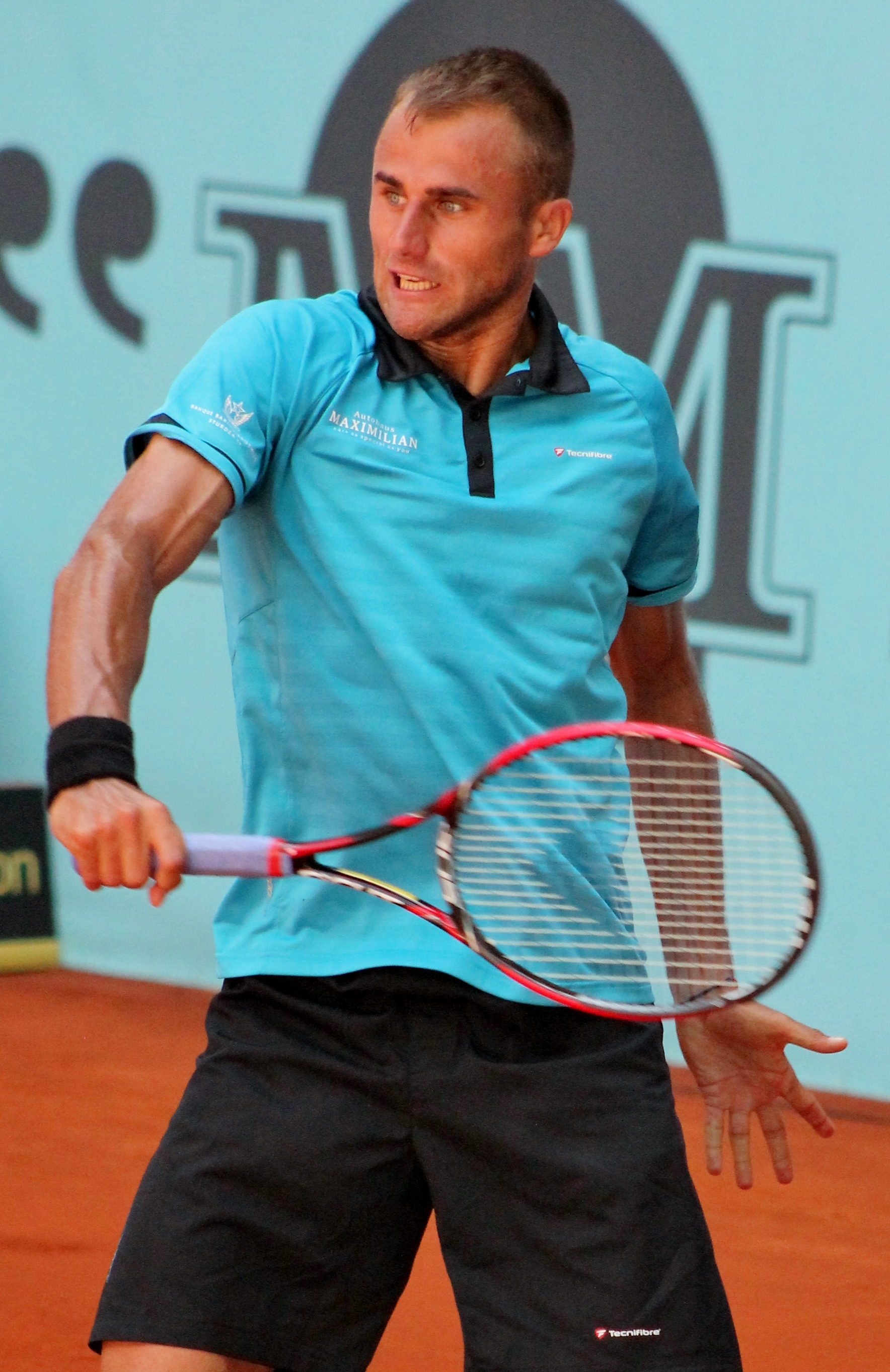
Copil in 2014

=== 2009: ATP debut ===
In September 2009 he received wildcard for the main draw of 2009 BCR Open Romania, where he defeated his fellow countryman Victor Crivoi in the first round, but lost to Spaniard Rubén Ramírez Hidalgo in the second round.

=== 2010–2012: Challenger Tour success ===
In May 2010, Copil reached his first ATP Challenger Tour final at the Trofeo Paolo Corazzi as a qualifier. On his route to the final he won in three sets against Australian Bernard Tomic in the semifinals and finished runner-up to German Denis Gremelmayr.

The 2011 season started well for Copil, when he reached his second Challenger final at the Tretorn Serie+ event in Kazan, Russia. In the final, he won against fourth seed German Andreas Beck, in straight sets.

In 2012, Copil beat world No. 13 Marin Čilić in the first round at the China Open in Beijing.

=== 2015–2017: Major and top 100 debuts, ATP doubles title ===
He made his Grand Slam main draw debut at the 2015 Australian Open, where he defeated Pablo Andújar. At the same tournament, he recorded the fastest serve at a Grand Slam: 242.0 km/h (150.4 mph).

At the 2015 Romanian Open in April, partnering fellow Romanian Adrian Ungur, after saving five match points, they defeated Nicholas Monroe/Artem Sitak 17–15 in the match tiebreak to become the first Romanian team to win the Bucharest title since 1998 (Pavel/Trifu). At the 2015 's-Hertogenbosch Open, Copil defeated Jarkko Nieminen and Guillermo García López as a wildcard to reach the quarterfinals.

Copil made his top 100 singles debut after the 2017 Mutua Madrid Open, where he was a wildcard entry, at World No. 90 on 15 May 2017.

=== 2018: Two ATP singles finals ===
Copil reached his first ATP World Tour-level singles final at the Sofia Open, where he lost to Mirza Bašić.

Ranked No. 93, Copil reached the final of the Swiss Indoors in Basel as a qualifier, losing to Roger Federer after defeating world No. 6 Marin Čilić and No. 5 Alexander Zverev on the way, his first ever wins over top-10 players. He became the lowest-ranked Basel finalist since No. 100 Patrick McEnroe in 1994 and the first qualifier in the final since Baghdatis in 2005.

=== 2019: Career-high singles ranking, Grand Slam success ===
Copil reached the 2019 Australian Open second round for the second time defeating Marcel Granollers in straight sets. As a result, he reached a career-high singles ranking of No. 56 on 28 January 2019.

His best showing in doubles at a Grand Slam in his career was reaching the third round of the 2019 French Open partnering Rohan Bopanna. He also reached the second round of the 2019 US Open for the first time in his career in singles and doubles.

=== 2022–2024: Surgery, comeback ===
In 2022, he won his first title in six years, at the ITF M25 Portimao, since the Budapest Challenger in 2016.

Copil underwent surgery on 30 May 2024 and came back to the ITF tour five months later in October 2024.

=== 2025: Retirement ===
Following a four-month hiatus, Copil played his last two ATP matches at the 2025 Țiriac Open partnering with Luca Preda.

Copil announced his retirement from professional tennis in November 2025.

== Personal life ==
Copil currently resides and trains in his hometown Arad, Romania. He got married with his long-term girlfriend Ramona in 2018. His first son Arthur was born in 2020. Besides playing professional tennis Copil also enjoys playing football, watching moto GP, collecting watches and he is an amateur photographer. Marius currently has a dog named Alex Bogdan.

== Performance timeline ==
Key
W	F	SF	QF	#R	RR	Q#	P#	DNQ	A	Z#	PO	G	S	B	NMS	NTI	P	NH

(W) winner; (F) finalist; (SF) semifinalist; (QF) quarterfinalist; (#R) rounds 4, 3, 2, 1; (RR) round-robin stage; (Q#) qualification round; (P#) preliminary round; (DNQ) did not qualify; (A) absent; (Z#) Davis/Fed Cup Zonal Group (with number indication) or (PO) play-off; (G) gold, (S) silver or (B) bronze Olympic/Paralympic medal; (NMS) not a Masters tournament; (NTI) not a Tier I tournament; (P) postponed; (NH) not held; (SR) strike rate (events won / competed); (W–L) win–loss record.
To avoid confusion and double counting, these charts are updated at the conclusion of a tournament or when the player's participation has ended.

Tournament	2005	2006	2007	2008	2009	2010	2011	2012	2013	2014	2015	2016	2017	2018	2019	2020	2021	2022	W–L
Grand Slam tournaments
Australian Open	A	A	A	A	A	A	A	A	Q1	Q2	2R	Q2	Q1	1R	2R	Q2	Q1	A	2–3
French Open	A	A	A	A	A	A	Q2	A	Q1	Q2	Q3	Q3	1R	1R	1R	Q1	Q1	Q2	0–3
Wimbledon	A	A	A	A	A	A	A	A	A	Q2	Q2	1R	1R	1R	1R	NH	Q2	Q1	0–4
US Open	A	A	A	A	A	A	Q2	Q3	Q1	Q1	Q2	Q1	1R	1R	2R	A	Q2	A	1–3
Win–loss	0–0	0–0	0–0	0–0	0–0	0–0	0–0	0–0	0–0	0–0	1–1	0–1	0–3	0–4	2–4	0–0	0–0	0–0	3–13

== ATP Tour finals ==
=== Singles: 2 (2 runner-ups) ===
Legend Grand Slam (0–0) ATP 1000 (0–0) ATP 500 (0–1) ATP 250 (0–1)	Finals by surface Hard (0–2) Clay (0–0) Grass (0–0)	Finals by setting Outdoor (0–0) Indoor (0–2)

Result	W–L	Date	Tournament	Tier	Surface	Opponent	Score
Loss	0–1	Feb 2018	Sofia Open, Bulgaria	ATP 250	Hard (i)	(Bosnia and Herzegovina) Mirza Bašić	6–7^{(6–8)}, 7–6^{(7–4)}, 4–6
Loss	0–2	Oct 2018	Swiss Indoors, Switzerland	ATP 500	Hard (i)	(Switzerland) Roger Federer	6–7^{(5–7)}, 4–6

=== Doubles: 1 (title) ===
Legend Grand Slam (0–0) ATP 1000 (0–0) ATP 500 (0–0) ATP 250 (1–0)	Finals by surface Hard (0–0) Clay (1–0) Grass (0–0)	Finals by setting Outdoor (1–0) Indoor (0–0)

Result	W–L	Date	Tournament	Tier	Surface	Partner	Opponents	Score
Win	1–0	Apr 2015	Romanian Open, Romania	ATP 250	Clay	(Romania) Adrian Ungur	(United States) Nicholas Monroe (New Zealand) Artem Sitak	3–6, 7–5, [17–15]

== National representation ==
=== Davis Cup ===
==== Singles: 26 (18–8) ====
Edition	Round	Date	Against	Surface	Opponent	Win/Lose	Result
2009 World Group play-offs	PO	18–20 September 2009	Sweden	Hard (i)	(Sweden) Andreas Vinciguerra	Win	4–6 ret.
2010 Europe/Africa Zone Group I	QF	7–8 May 2010	Ukraine	Clay	(Ukraine) Ivan Sergeyev	Unfinished	4–6, 2–1
2011 World Group play-offs	PO	16–18 September 2011	Czech Republic	Clay	(Czech Republic) Lukáš Rosol	Lose	4–6, 6–7^{(2–7)}
2012 Europe/Africa Zone Group I	1R PO	14–16 September 2012	Finland	Hard (i)	(Finland) Harri Heliövaara	Win	3–6, 6–4, 6–2, 6–4
2012 Europe/Africa Zone Group I	1R PO	14–16 September 2012	Finland	Hard (i)	(Finland) Jarkko Nieminen	Lose	3–6, 5–7, 6–1, 6–7^{(4–7)}
2013 Europe/Africa Zone Group I	1R	1–3 February 2013	Denmark	Hard (i)	(Denmark) Frederik Nielsen	Win	6–3, 7–6^{(9–7)}, 6–4
2013 Europe/Africa Zone Group I	1R	1–3 February 2013	Denmark	Hard (i)	(Denmark) Christoffer Kønigsfeldt	Win	6–4, 6–3
2013 Europe/Africa Zone Group I	2R	5–7 April 2013	Netherlands	Hard	(Netherlands) Thiemo de Bakker	Lose	6–7^{(3–7)}, 6–7^{(2–7)}
2014 Europe/Africa Zone Group I	1R PO	12–14 September 2014	Sweden	Clay	(Sweden) Elias Ymer	Win	6–2, 6–3, 6–2
2015 Europe/Africa Zone Group I	1R	6–8 March 2015	Israel	Hard (i)	(Israel) Dudi Sela	Win	6–7^{(3–7)}, 7–6^{(7–3)}, 6–4, 6–2
2015 Europe/Africa Zone Group I	1R	6–8 March 2015	Israel	Hard (i)	(Israel) Bar Tzuf Botzer	Win	7–6^{(7–3)}, 6–3
2015 Europe/Africa Zone Group I	2R	17–19 July 2015	Slovakia	Clay	(Slovakia) Norbert Gombos	Win	7–6^{(7–5)}, 6–7^{(6–8)}, 6–4, 7–6^{(12–10)}
2015 Europe/Africa Zone Group I	2R	17–19 July 2015	Slovakia	Clay	(Slovakia) Martin Kližan	Lose	7–6^{(7–3)}, 6–3
2016 Europe/Africa Zone Group I	1R	4–6 March 2016	Slovenia	Hard (i)	(Slovenia) Blaž Rola	Win	7–5, 6–3, 7–6^{(7–5)}
2016 Europe/Africa Zone Group I	1R	4–6 March 2016	Slovenia	Hard (i)	(Slovenia) Tomislav Ternar	Win	6–3, 6–3
2016 Europe/Africa Zone Group I	2R	15–17 July 2016	Spain	Hard	(Spain) Feliciano López	Lose	6–7^{(7-7)}, 7–5, 4–6, 6–3, 3–6
2017 Europe/Africa Zone Group I	1R	3–5 February 2017	Belarus	Hard (i)	(Belarus) Egor Gerasimov	Lose	3–6, 4–6, 4–6
2017 Europe/Africa Zone Group I	1R	3–5 February 2017	Belarus	Hard (i)	(Belarus) Ilya Ivashka	Win	7–5, 6–3, 6–1
2018 Europe/Africa Zone Group II	1R	3–4 February 2018	Luxembourg	Hard (i)	(Luxembourg) Christophe Tholl	Win	6–3, 6–2
2018 Europe/Africa Zone Group II	1R	3–4 February 2018	Luxembourg	Hard (i)	(Luxembourg) Ugo Nastasi	Win	6–1, 6–1
2018 Europe/Africa Zone Group II	2R	7–8 April 2019	Morocco	Hard (i)	(Morocco) Amine Ahouda	Win	6–0, 6–1
2018 Europe/Africa Zone Group II	3R	15–16 September 2019	Poland	Clay (i)	(Poland) Kamil Majchrzak	Win	6–2, 6–4
2018 Europe/Africa Zone Group II	3R	15–16 September 2019	Poland	Clay (i)	(Poland) Hubert Hurkacz	Lose	3–6, 4–6
2019 Europe/Africa Zone Group II	—	5–6 April 2019	Zimbabwe	Hard (i)	(Zimbabwe) Benjamin Lock	Lose	4–6, 5–7
2019 Europe/Africa Zone Group II	—	5–6 April 2019	Zimbabwe	Hard (i)	(Zimbabwe) Takanyi Garanganga	Win	6–4, 7–5
2020–2021 World Group I	PO	17–19 September 2021	Portugal	Hard (i)	(Portugal) Gastão Elias	Win	6–4, 6–3
2020–2021 World Group I	PO	17–19 September 2021	Portugal	Hard (i)	(Portugal) Gastão Elias	Win	6–3, 2–6, 6–4

==== Doubles: 3 (2–1) ====
Edition	Round	Date	Partner	Against	Surface	Opponents	Win/Lose	Result
2009 World Group	1R	6–8 March 2009	(Romania) Horia Tecău	Russia	Hard (i)	(Russia) Marat Safin (Russia) Dmitry Tursunov	Win	4–6, 6–7^{(2–7)}, 7–6^{(7–4)}, 7–6^{(7–5)}, 6–4
2011 World Group play-offs	PO	16–18 September 2011	(Romania) Horia Tecău	Czech Republic	Clay	(Czech Republic) Tomáš Berdych (Czech Republic) Radek Štěpánek	Lose	6–3, 3–6, 0–6, 2–6
2014 Europe/Africa Zone Group I	1R	31 January – 2 February 2014	(Romania) Horia Tecău	Ukraine	Hard	(Ukraine) Sergei Bubka (Ukraine) Denys Molchanov	Win	5–7, 6–3, 6–4, 6–4

== ATP Challenger and ITF Tour finals ==
=== Singles: 21 (8 titles, 13 runner-ups) ===
Legend ATP Challenger (3–9) ITF Futures/WTT (5–4)	Finals by surface Hard (5–8) Clay (3–3) Grass (0–1) Carpet (0–1)

Result	W–L	Date	Tournament	Tier	Surface	Opponent	Score
Win	1–0	Aug 2007	Romania F16, Arad	Futures	Clay	(Argentina) Martín Alund	6–4, 6–3
Win	2–0	Aug 2008	Romania F16, Deva	Futures	Clay	(Romania) Andrei Mlendea	6–3, 7–6^{(7–5)}
Loss	2–1	Aug 2009	Romania F14, Arad	Futures	Clay	(Hungary) Attila Balázs	6–3, 5–7, 3–6
Loss	2–2	Oct 2009	Greece F3, Paros	Futures	Carpet	(Croatia) Petar Jelenic	6–2, 4–6, 6–7^{(2–7)}
Win	3–2	Jan 2010	Guatemala F1, Guatemala City	Futures	Hard	(Ecuador) Iván Endara	7–6^{(7–5)}, 7–6^{(7–3)}
Loss	0–1	May 2010	Cremona, Italy	Challenger	Hard	(Germany) Denis Gremelmayr	4–6, 5–7
Loss	3–3	Jan 2011	Germany F2, Stuttgart	Futures	Hard	(Czech Republic) Jan Mertl	6–2, 3–6, 4–6
Win	1–1	Feb 2011	Kazan, Russia	Challenger	Hard	(Germany) Andreas Beck	6–4, 6–4
Loss	3–4	May 2011	Romania F1, Bucharest	Futures	Clay	(Romania) Petru-Alexandru Luncanu	6–3, 4–6, 5–7
Loss	1–2	Feb 2012	Kazan, Russia	Challenger	Hard	(Estonia) Jürgen Zopp	6–7^{(4–7)}, 6–7^{(4–7)}
Win	2–2	Feb 2013	Quimper, France	Challenger	Hard	(France) Marc Gicquel	7–6^{(11–9)}, 6–4
Loss	2–3	Jun 2013	Arad, Romania	Challenger	Clay	(Romania) Adrian Ungur	4–6, 6–7^{(3–7)}
Loss	2–4	Jul 2013	Guimarães, Portugal	Challenger	Hard	(Portugal) João Sousa	3–6, 0–6
Loss	2–5	Sep 2015	İzmir, Tunisia	Challenger	Hard	(Slovakia) Lukaš Lacko	3–6, 6–7^{(5–7)}
Loss	2–6	Jun 2016	Surbiton, United Kingdom	Challenger	Grass	(Chinese Taipei) Lu Yen-hsun	5–7, 6–7^{(11–13)}
Win	3–6	Oct 2016	Budapest, Hungary	Challenger	Hard	(Belgium) Steve Darcis	6–4, 6–2
Loss	3–7	Nov 2016	Bratislava, Slovakia	Challenger	Hard	(Slovakia) Norbert Gombos	6–7^{(8–10)}, 6–4, 3–6
Loss	3–8	Oct 2017	Kaohsiung, Taiwan	Challenger	Hard	(Russia) Evgeny Donskoy	6–7^{(0–7)}, 5–7
Loss	3–9	Nov 2017	Bratislava, Slovakia	Challenger	Hard	(Slovakia) Lukáš Lacko	4–6, 6–7^{(4–7)}
Win	4–4	Mar 2022	M25 Portimão, Portugal	WTT	Hard	Alexey Vatutin	7–5, 6–2
Win	5–4	Jul 2023	M25 Bacău, Romania	WTT	Clay	(Argentina) Hernán Casanova	6–3, 7–6^{(7–4)}

=== Doubles: 19 (9 titles, 10 runner-ups) ===
Legend ATP Challenger (2–3) ITF Futures (7–7)	Finals by surface Hard (3–2) Clay (5–8) Carpet (1–0)

Result	W–L	Date	Tournament	Tier	Surface	Partner	Opponents	Score
Win	1–0	Aug 2008	Romania F16, Deva	Futures	Clay	(Romania) Ilie-Aurelian Giurgiu	(Poland) Bojan Szumanski (Austria) Hubert Holzler	6–3, 6–2
Win	2–0	Feb 2009	Germany F5, Nussloch	Futures	Carpet	(Romania) Petru-Alexandru Luncanu	(United Kingdom) Jonathan Marray (Denmark) Rasmus Nørby	walkover
Win	3–0	May 2009	Romania F1, Craiova	Futures	Clay	(Romania) Petru-Alexandru Luncanu	(Moldova) Andrei Ciumac (Moldova) Radu Albot	7–5, 6–1
Loss	3–1	Jul 2009	Romania F9, Iași	Futures	Clay	(Romania) Victor Ioniță	(Ukraine) Gleb Alekseenko (Ukraine) Vadim Alekseenko	3–6, 6–2, [7–10]
Loss	3–2	Jul 2009	Romania F10, Cluj-Napoca	Futures	Clay	(Romania) Ilie-Aurelian Giurgiu	(Ukraine) Gleb Alekseenko (Ukraine) Vadim Alekseenko	4–6, 4–6
Loss	3–3	Jul 2009	Romania F11, Oradea	Futures	Clay	(Romania) Ilie-Aurelian Giurgiu	(Hungary) Attila Balázs (Hungary) György Balázs	2–6, 2–6
Loss	3–4	Aug 2009	Italy F23, Bolzano	Futures	Clay	(Netherlands) Antal van der Duim	(Italy) Manuel Jorquera (Portugal) Leonardo Tavares	7–6^{(7–2)}, 3–6, [5–10]
Win	4–4	Aug 2009	Romania F14, Arad	Futures	Clay	(Canada) Vasek Pospisil	(Romania) Andrei Mlendea (Czech Republic) Jiří Školoudík	6–3, 6–4
Loss	4–5	Aug 2009	Romania F15, Brașov	Futures	Clay	(Canada) Vasek Pospisil	(Spain) C C-Rodriguez (Spain) Gerard Granollers-Pujol	5–7, 7–6^{(7–2)}, [10–12]
Win	5–5	Jan 2010	Guatemala F1, Guatemala City	Futures	Hard	(Ecuador) Iván Endara	(United States) James Ludlow (United States) Ruben Gonzales	7–5, 6–3
Loss	5–6	Oct 2010	Italy F30, Calabria	Futures	Clay	(Italy) Giuseppe Faraone	(Italy) Andrea Arnaboldi (Italy) Gianluca Naso	4–6, 4–6
Win	6–6	Jan 2012	Germany F2, Stuttgart	Futures	Hard	(Germany) Simon Stadler	(Germany) Kevin Krawietz (Germany) Marcel Zimmermann	6–1, 6–2
Loss	6–7	May 2012	Romania F2, Bucharest	Futures	Clay	(Romania) Victor Crivoi	(Romania) Florin Mergea (Romania) Andrei Dăescu	6–7^{(4–7)}, 2–6
Win	7–7	Jun 2012	Romania F3, Bacău	Futures	Clay	(Romania) Victor Crivoi	(Finland) Harri Heliövaara (Finland) Timo Nieminen	6–3, 6–4
Win	1–0	Sep 2012	Brașov, Romania	Challenger	Clay	(Romania) Victor Crivoi	(Moldova) Andrei Ciumac (Ukraine) Aleksandr Nedovyesov	6–7^{(8–10)}, 6–4, [12–10]
Loss	1–1	Jul 2014	Binghamton, United States	Challenger	Hard	(Ukraine) Sergiy Stakhovsky	(United Kingdom) Daniel Cox (United Kingdom) Daniel Smethurst	7–6^{(7–3)}, 2–6, [6–10]
Loss	1–2	Sep 2014	Sibiu, Romania	Challenger	Clay	(Romania) Alexandru-Daniel Carpen	(Italy) Potito Starace (Romania) Adrian Ungur	5–7, 2–6
Loss	1–3	Sep 2016	Istanbul, Turkey	Challenger	Hard	(Switzerland) Marco Chiudinelli	(France) Sadio Doumbia (France) Calvin Hemery	4–6, 3–6
Win	2–3	Sep 2016	İzmir, Turkey	Challenger	Hard	(Switzerland) Marco Chiudinelli	(France) Sadio Doumbia (France) Calvin Hemery	6–4, 6–4

== Wins over top 10 players ==
- Copil's match record against players who were, at the time the match was played, ranked in the top 10.

Season	2018	2019	Total
Wins	2	0	2

#	Player	Rank	Event	Surface	Rd	Score	MC Rank
2018
1.	(Croatia) Marin Čilić	6	Swiss Indoors, Switzerland	Hard (i)	2R	7–5, 7–6^{(7–2)}	93
2.	(Germany) Alexander Zverev	5	Swiss Indoors, Switzerland	Hard (i)	SF	6–3, 6–7^{(6–8)}, 6–4	93
