= Conor Niland =

Irish tennis player (born 1981)

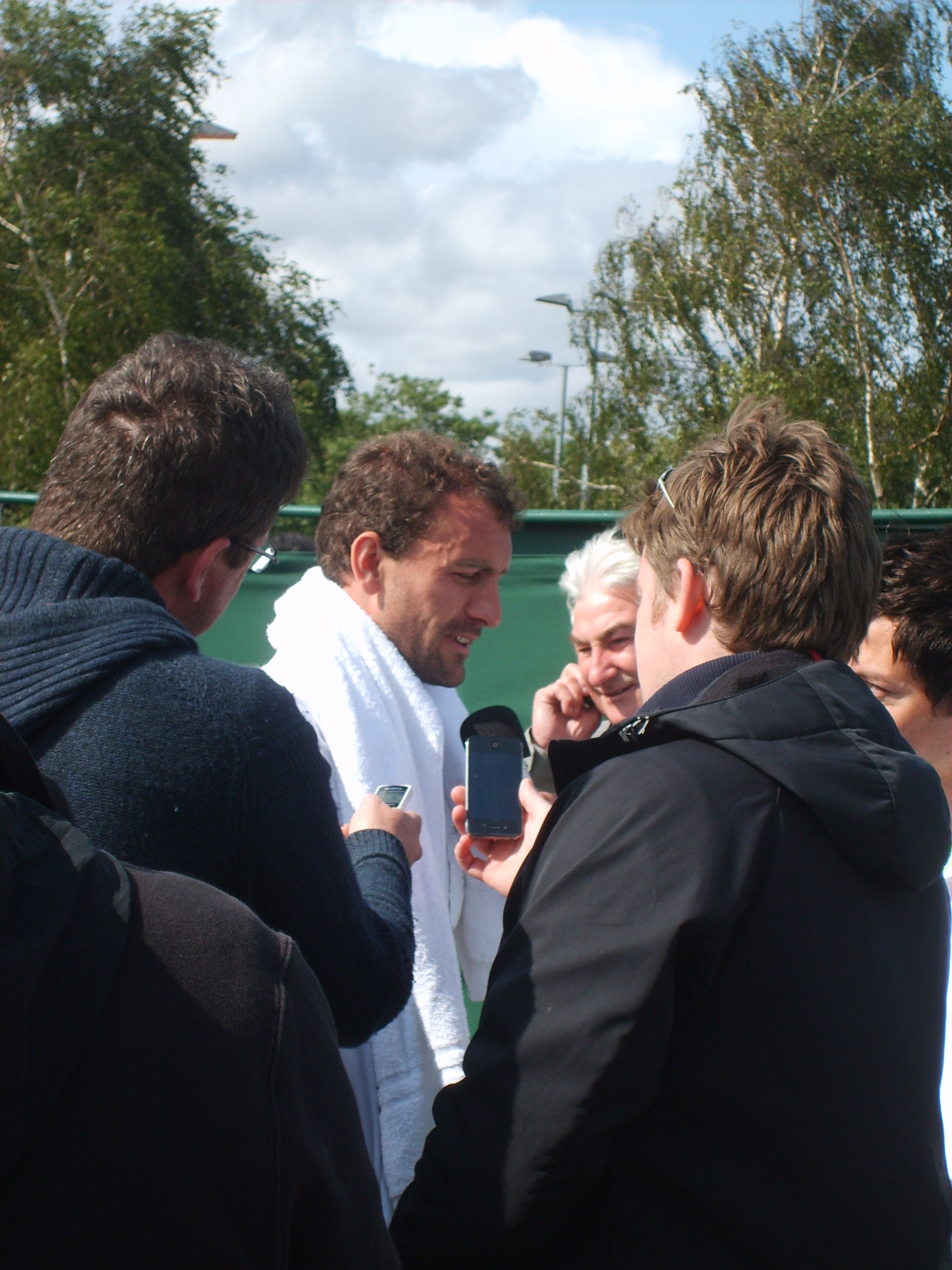
- Country (sports): Ireland
- Residence: Limerick, Ireland
- Born: 19 September 1981 (age 44) Birmingham, England
- Height: 1.85 m (6 ft 1 in)
- Turned pro: 2005
- Retired: 2012
- Plays: Right-handed (two-handed backhand)
- Prize money: $247,686

Singles
- Career record: 10–16
- Career titles: 0
- Highest ranking: No. 129 (6 December 2010)

Grand Slam singles results
- Australian Open: Q3 (2010)
- French Open: Q2 (2010)
- Wimbledon: 1R (2011)
- US Open: 1R (2011)

Doubles
- Career record: 0–1
- Career titles: 0
- Highest ranking: No. 770 (23 August 2010)
- Last updated on: 3 December 2021.

Conor Niland (born 19 September 1981) is an Irish former professional tennis player and non-fiction author. He was born in Birmingham, England, and grew up in Limerick, Ireland. He attended St. Nessan's National School in Mungret, Limerick, before moving on to Crescent College Comprehensive in Dooradoyle, Limerick. He was the highest ranked Irish tennis player during his career. He played for the Ireland Davis Cup team from 2000 to 2012. He officially announced his retirement from tennis on 12 April 2012 due to a recurring hip injury. In a statement Niland said: "I am today sadly announcing my retirement from professional tennis. I have been suffering from labral tears in both hip cartilages and this has resulted in pain and restricted movement for the past nine months."

== Career ==
Niland spent most of his career on the Futures and Challenger circuits, although he has played a handful of ATP World Tour tournaments. As of 6 March 2010, he played in 25 Davis Cup matches for Ireland with a record of 15 wins & 10 losses (12–9 in singles & 3–1 in doubles). After 4 previous defeats, he won his first ever Grand Slam qualifying match on 26 August 2009 when defeating Australia's Joseph Sirianni 6–0, 6–4 in the first qualifying round of the US Open, but in the end he failed to qualify for the main draw.

In January 2010, he lost in the last qualifying round of the Qatar Open in Doha, and in the first major of the year, he defeated Henri Kontinen (6–4,6–4) and Jesse Witten (2–6,6–1,6–4) in the first 2 qualifying rounds for the Australian Open to leave him one game away from the main draw. However, he lost to Ricardo Hocevar (6–1,4–6,3–6) in the final qualifying round. In Houston, Texas, at the U.S. Men's Clay Court Championships, he qualified for his first ATP main draw but lost in the first round. His improvement during the year continued when winning the Israel Open title, Rainer Schüttler among his highest-ranked victim. The win pushed him into the top 200 for the first time in his career, lifting him to 165 in the world, and he reclaimed his place as Irish No.1 from Louk Sorensen. In November 2010, Niland won another ATP challenger event, this time the ATP Salzburg Indoors in Austria, lifting him to a career high ranking of 129.

After an encouraging start to 2011 saw Niland reach the quarter-finals of the Heilbronn Open in Germany, he struggled throughout the first half of the year with illness and injury and fell to a ranking of 184 by June. He came into great form for the grass court season, however, and picked up 4 straight wins to qualify for the Aegon Trophy in Nottingham and also defeat 96th-ranked Donald Young in the first round. After Tatsuma Ito ended that winning streak, Niland turned his attention to the Wimbledon qualifying rounds. He successfully negotiated all 3 rounds, defeating Josselin Ouanna, Greg Jones and finally Nikola Mektić, to qualify for his first ever Grand Slam event. In doing so, he also became the first Irishman to reach the main draw at Wimbledon since Sean Sorensen in 1977 and 1980. He faced Frenchman Adrian Mannarino in the first round where he lost in five sets, having led 4–1 with a double-break in the fifth set. Had he won, Niland would have faced six-time champion Roger Federer in the second round.

Niland participated in the 2011 US Open. In the first round of the Singles Qualifying, he faced Pavol Červenák and won 6–1, 6–4. In the second round, Niland defeated Tsung-Hua Yang 6–2, 6–3 In the third round, Niland beat Matwé Middelkoop 2–6, 6–1, 6–4 for a place in the Main Draw. This was Niland's second time in a row to qualify for the main draw of a Grand Slam. In the first round, Niland retired against World No. 1, Novak Djokovic, whilst trailing 0–6, 1–5, due to food poisoning.

On 12 April 2012, Niland announced his retirement due to a recurring hip injury which resulted in pain and restricted his movement for the previous nine months. He was considering having hip surgery but was "advised of a lengthy recovery time without any guarantee of a successful outcome." Niland thanked those who had helped him achieve his success. He said: "I would like to thank my family, in particular my parents, for their phenomenal support throughout my tennis career. I would not have been able to achieve the things I did without them."

In June 2024, Niland published his "underdog's memoir" of his tennis career, The Racket: On Tour with Tennis’s Golden Generation – and the other 99%. The book was awarded the William Hill Sports Book of the Year Award in 2024.

== Personal life ==
Although Niland was born in Birmingham, his parents moved the family back to Limerick when he was 2 years old. He stayed there until the age of 16, when he went to Millfield, the public school in Somerset that is renowned for its sporting prowess. After three years there, Niland went to study English at University of California, Berkeley, before leaving to focus on playing tennis professionally in 2005. His father, Ray, played at corner back for the Mayo senior Gaelic football team, while his sister Gina is a former Irish No.1 tennis player.

Niland lives in Dublin with his wife, Síne, and two children, Emma and Tom.

== ATP Challenger and ITF Futures Finals ==
=== Singles: 14 (8–6) ===
Legend ATP Challenger (3–0) ITF Futures (5–6)	Finals by surface Hard (4–3) Clay (3–2) Grass (0–0) Carpet (1–1)

Result	W–L	Date	Tournament	Tier	Surface	Opponent	Score
Win	1–0	Aug 2006	Great Britain F12, Wrexham	Futures	Hard	(Italy) Riccardo Ghedin	6–3, 2–6, 6–3
Loss	1–1	Oct 2006	Great Britain F16, Glasgow	Futures	Hard	(United Kingdom) Richard Bloomfield	3–6, 6–7^{(5–7)}
Win	2–1	Mar 2007	Croatia F4, Vrsar	Futures	Clay	(Hungary) Kornel Bardoczky	6–4, 6–4
Loss	2–2	Apr 2007	Croatia F5, Rovinj	Futures	Clay	(Slovenia) Marko Tkalec	4–6, 5–7
Loss	2–3	Sep 2007	Great Britain F17, Nottingham	Futures	Hard	(Austria) Martin Fischer	4–6, 3–6
Loss	2–4	Apr 2008	Great Britain F6, Exmouth	Futures	Carpet	(United Kingdom) Josh Goodall	4–6, 6–7^{(3–7)}
Win	3–4	May 2008	Great Britain F7, Bournemouth	Futures	Clay	(France) Pierre Metenier	7–5, 6–0
Win	4–4	Jun 2008	Ireland F2, Limerick	Futures	Carpet	(India) Harsh Mankad	6–3, 6–4
Win	5–4	Aug 2008	New Delhi, India	Challenger	Hard	(Czech Republic) Tomáš Cakl	6–4, 6–4
Loss	5–5	Oct 2009	France F18, Saint-Dizier	Futures	Hard	(France) Antony Dupuis	3–6, 6–4, 4–6
Loss	5–6	Nov 2009	USA F27, Birmingham	Futures	Clay	(Australia) James Lemke	6–4, 2–6, 5–7
Win	6–6	Nov 2009	USA F28, Niceville	Futures	Clay	(Australia) James Lemke	3–6, 6–4, 6–0
Win	7–6	May 2010	Ramat Hasharon, Israel	Challenger	Hard	(Brazil) Thiago Alves	5–7, 7–6^{(7–5)}, 6–3
Win	8–6	Nov 2010	Salzburg, Austria	Challenger	Hard	(Poland) Jerzy Janowicz	7–6^{(7–5)}, 6–7^{(2–7)}, 6–3

== Performance timeline ==
Key
W	F	SF	QF	#R	RR	Q#	DNQ	A	NH

(W) winner; (F) finalist; (SF) semifinalist; (QF) quarterfinalist; (#R) rounds 4, 3, 2, 1; (RR) round-robin stage; (Q#) qualification round; (DNQ) did not qualify; (A) absent; (NH) not held; (SR) strike rate (events won / competed); (W–L) win–loss record.

=== Singles ===
Tournament	2008	2009	2010	2011	2012	SR	W–L	Win%
Grand Slam tournaments
Australian Open	Q1	Q1	Q3	Q1	Q1	0 / 0	0–0	–
French Open	A	A	Q2	Q1	A	0 / 0	0–0	–
Wimbledon	Q1	Q1	Q1	1R	A	0 / 1	0–1	0%
US Open	A	Q2	Q2	1R	A	0 / 1	0–1	0%
Win–loss	0–0	0–0	0–0	0–2	0–0	0 / 2	0–2	0%
