= Trofeo Paolo Corazzi =

Defunct tennis tournament
- Event name: Cremona
- Founded: 2004
- Abolished: 2011
- Editions: 8
- Location: Cremona, Italy
- Venue: Centro Sportivo Stradivari
- Category: ATP Challenger Tour
- Surface: Hard
- Draw: 32S/32Q/16D
- Website: www.csstradivari.it

The Trofeo Paolo Corazzi was a professional tennis tournament played on outdoor hardcourts. It was part of the ATP Challenger Tour. It was held annually at the Centro Sportivo Stradivari in Cremona, Italy, since 1997 (as a club event from 1997 to 2003, as a Futures from 2004 to 2007, as a Challenger since 2008).

Eduardo Schwank was the only player to win both singles and doubles titles in the same year.

== Past finals ==
=== Singles ===
Year	Champion	Runner-up	Score
2011	(Russia) Igor Kunitsyn	(Germany) Rainer Schüttler	6–2, 7–6(2)
2010	(Germany) Denis Gremelmayr	(Romania) Marius Copil	6–4, 7–5
2009	(Germany) Benjamin Becker	(South Africa) Izak van der Merwe	7–6(3), 6–1
2008	(Argentina) Eduardo Schwank	(Germany) Björn Phau	6–3, 6–4
2007	(Spain) Gabriel Trujillo Soler	(Netherlands) Igor Sijsling	6–2, 6–3
2006	(France) Xavier Audouy	(Czech Republic) David Novak	6–7(5), 6–4, 6–2
2005	(Republic of Ireland) Kevin Sorensen	(Italy) Alessandro Piccari	6–1, 6–4
2004	(Italy) Andrea Stoppini	(Switzerland) Michael Lammer	6–3, 7–6(4)

=== Doubles ===
Year	Champions	Runners-up	Score
2011	(Philippines) Treat Conrad Huey (India) Purav Raja	(Poland) Tomasz Bednarek (Poland) Mateusz Kowalczyk	6–1, 6–2
2010	(Austria) Alexander Peya (Austria) Martin Slanar	(South Africa) Rik de Voest (South Africa) Izak van der Merwe	7–5, 7–5
2009	(United Kingdom) Colin Fleming (United Kingdom) Ken Skupski	(Italy) Daniele Bracciali (Italy) Alessandro Motti	6–2, 6–1
2008	(Argentina) Eduardo Schwank (Serbia) Dušan Vemić	(Romania) Florin Mergea (Romania) Horia Tecău	6–3, 6–2
2007	(Croatia) Ivan Cerović (Netherlands) Igor Sijsling	(Argentina) Alejandro Fabbri (Spain) Gabriel Trujillo Soler	7–6(3), 6–4
2006	(France) Jean-François Bachelot (France) David Guez	(Romania) Bogdan-Victor Leonte (Brazil) Rogério Dutra da Silva	6–4, 6–3
2005	(Austria) Max Raditschnigg (Germany) Alexander Satschko	(Italy) Alessandro da Col (Italy) Fabio Colangelo	7–6(8), 6–4
2004	(Spain) David Marrero (Spain) José Antonio Sánchez de Luna	(Italy) Fabio Colangelo (Italy) Alessandro Motti	6–4, 7–5
