= Martin Slanar =

Austrian tennis player

- Country (sports): Austria
- Born: 1 May 1981 (age 43)
- Retired: 2011
- Plays: Right-handed (two-handed backhand)
- Prize money: $171,093

Singles
- Career record: 1–2
- Career titles: 0
- Highest ranking: No. 198 (19 May 2008)

Grand Slam singles results
- Australian Open: 1R (2008)
- French Open: Q1 (2008)
- Wimbledon: Q2 (2008)
- US Open: Q1 (2008)

Doubles
- Career record: 0–1
- Career titles: 0
- Highest ranking: No. 94 (6 December 2010)

Martin Slanar (born 1 May 1981) is an Austrian male tennis player.

== Professional career ==
=== 2007 ===
Slanar's career got going in 2007. His career-best singles ranking is world No. 198, achieved in May 2008.
