= 2011 ATP Challenger Trophy – Singles =

Singles
- 2011 ATP Challenger Trophy

Final
- Champion: (Spain) Íñigo Cervantes-Huegun
- Runner-up: (Slovakia) Pavol Červenák
- Score: 6–4, 7–6^{(7–3)}

Events
Singles	Doubles
← 2010 ·	ATP Challenger Trophy	· 2012 →

Jaroslav Pospíšil was the defending champion but lost in the quarterfinals to eventual champion Íñigo Cervantes-Huegun. Spanish qualifier won in the final 6–4, 7–6^{(7–3)}, against Pavol Červenák.

== Seeds ==
1. (Slovakia) Martin Kližan (first round)
2. (Germany) Dustin Brown (first round)
3. (Germany) Björn Phau (quarterfinals)
4. (France) Augustin Gensse (first round)
5. (Czech Republic) Jaroslav Pospíšil (quarterfinals)
6. (Czech Republic) Jan Hájek (semifinals, retired due to left knee injury)
7. (France) Maxime Teixeira (first round)
8. (Kazakhstan) Yuri Schukin (quarterfinals)

== Draw ==
=== Key ===
- Q = Qualifier
- WC = Wild card
- LL = Lucky loser
- Alt = Alternate
- SE = Special exempt
- PR = Protected ranking
- ITF = ITF entry
- JE = Junior exempt
- w/o = Walkover
- r = Retired
- d = Defaulted
- SR = Special ranking

=== Finals ===
Semifinals
Q	(Spain) Íñigo Cervantes-Huegun	3	6	4
6	(Czech Republic) Jan Hájek	6	4	1^{r}
Q	(Slovakia) Kamil Čapkovič	2	4
(Slovakia) Pavol Červenák	6	6

Final
Q	(Spain) Íñigo Cervantes-Huegun	6	7^{7}
(Slovakia) Pavol Červenák	4	6^{3}

=== Top half ===
First round
1	(Slovakia) M Kližan	1	2
(Slovakia) A Martin	6	6
Q	(Spain) I Cervantes-Huegen	7^{7}	6
WC	(Austria) Tristan-Samuel Weiβborn	6^{2}	4
(Italy) M Crugnola	0	3
Q	(Switzerland) M Lammer	6	6
(Slovakia) I Klec	4	6	0
5	(Czech Republic) J Pospíšil	6	3	6
4	(France) A Gensse	2	1
(Czech Republic) D Lojda	6	6
(France) Axel Michon	2	3
Q	(Russia) A Kuznetsov	6	6
WC	(Czech Republic) Martin Přikryl	0	1
(Spain) G Granollers	6	6
(Hungary) A Balázs	0	1
6	(Czech Republic) J Hájek	6	6

Second round
(Slovakia) A Martin	2	7	5
Q	(Spain) I Cervantes-Huegen	6	5	7
Q	(Switzerland) M Lammer	0	6^{4}
5	(Czech Republic) J Pospíšil	6	7^{7}
(Czech Republic) D Lojda	6	0	6
Q	(Russia) A Kuznetsov	2	6	2
(Spain) G Granollers	2	6	2
6	(Czech Republic) J Hájek	6	4	6

Quarterfinals
Q	(Spain) I Cervantes-Huegen	7	7^{8}
5	(Czech Republic) J Pospíšil	5	6^{6}
(Czech Republic) D Lojda	1	6	4
6	(Czech Republic) J Hájek	6	3	6

Semifinals
Q	(Spain) I Cervantes-Huegen	3	6	4
6	(Czech Republic) J Hájek	6	4	1^{r}

=== Bottom half ===
First round
7	(France) M Teixeira	3	6	1
WC	(Slovakia) Jozef Kovalík	6	1	6
WC	(Slovakia) Norbert Gomboš	5	0
Q	(Slovakia) K Čapkovič	7	6
(Hungary) A Kellner	6	7^{7}
(Spain) G Olaso	2	6^{3}
LL	(Czech Republic) R Jebavý	4	6	4
3	(Germany) B Phau	6	2	6
8	(Kazakhstan) Y Schukin	6	6
(Poland) M Gawron	4	3
(Moldova) R Albot	5
LL	(Germany) Alexander Flock	0^{r}
(Portugal) J Sousa	6	6
(Italy) W Trusendi	1	2
(Slovakia) P Červenák	6	7^{8}
2	(Germany) D Brown	1	6^{6}

Second round
WC	(Slovakia) J Kovalík	6	2	1
Q	(Slovakia) K Čapkovič	0	6	6
(Hungary) A Kellner	5	0
3	(Germany) B Phau	7	6
8	(Kazakhstan) Y Schukin	7	6
(Moldova) R Albot	5	2
(Portugal) J Sousa	2	3
(Slovakia) P Červenák	6	6

Quarterfinals
Q	(Slovakia) K Čapkovič	6	6
3	(Germany) B Phau	4	4
8	(Kazakhstan) Y Schukin	3	1
(Slovakia) P Červenák	6	6

Semifinals
Q	(Slovakia) K Čapkovič	2	4
(Slovakia) P Červenák	6	6
