= 2013 Arimex Challenger Trophy – Singles =

Singles
- 2013 Arimex Challenger Trophy

Final
- Champion: (Germany) Julian Reister
- Runner-up: (Romania) Adrian Ungur
- Score: 7–6^{(7–3)},6–3

Events
| Singles | Doubles |
| ← 2012 · | Arimex Challenger Trophy | · 2014 → |

Andrey Kuznetsov was the defending champion, but lost to finalist Adrian Ungur in the quarterfinals, who lost to Julian Reister in the final.

== Seeds ==
1. (Russia) Andrey Kuznetsov (quarterfinals)
2. (Czech Republic) Jan Hájek (quarterfinals, retired)
3. (Slovenia) Aljaž Bedene (semifinals, retired)
4. (Germany) Julian Reister (champion)
5. (Romania) Adrian Ungur (final)
6. (Slovakia) Andrej Martin (first round)
7. (France) Stéphane Robert (semifinals)
8. (Serbia) Dušan Lajović (second round)

== Draw ==
=== Key ===
- Q = Qualifier
- WC = Wild card
- LL = Lucky loser
- Alt = Alternate
- SE = Special exempt
- PR = Protected ranking
- ITF = ITF entry
- JE = Junior exempt
- w/o = Walkover
- r = Retired
- d = Defaulted
- SR = Special ranking

=== Finals ===
Semifinals
5 | (Romania) Adrian Ungur | 7^{7} | 0
3 | (Slovenia) Aljaž Bedene | 6^{3} | 0^{r}
4 | (Germany) Julian Reister | 4 | 6 | 6
7 | (France) Stéphane Robert | 6 | 4 | 4

Final
5 | (Romania) Adrian Ungur | 6^{3} | 3
4 | (Germany) Julian Reister | 7^{7} | 6

=== Top half ===
First round
1 | (Russia) A Kuznetsov | 6 | 6
Q | (Austria) Pascal Brunner | 2 | 4
(Netherlands) B Westerhof | 6 | 6^{5} | 6^{4}
(Serbia) F Krajinović | 2 | 7^{7} | 7^{7}
(Czech Republic) R Jebavý | 1 | 6 | 2
WC | (Czech Republic) A Pavlásek | 6 | 4 | 6
(Belgium) S Darcis | 5 | 2
5 | (Romania) A Ungur | 7 | 6
3 | (Slovenia) A Bedene | 3 | 6 | 6
Q | (Serbia) N Ćaćić | 6 | 2 | 3
(United Kingdom) K Edmund | 6 | 7
(Ecuador) JC Campozano | 3 | 5
(Slovakia) M Mečíř | 6 | 1 | 4
(Czech Republic) J Pospíšil | 1 | 6 | 6
(Croatia) K Mesaroš | 6 | 6
6 | (Slovakia) A Martin | 2 | 4

Second round
1 | (Russia) A Kuznetsov | 6 | 7
(Serbia) F Krajinović | 1 | 5
(Czech Republic) A Pavlásek | 4 | 1
5 | (Romania) A Ungur | 6 | 6
3 | (Slovenia) A Bedene | 3 | 6 | 7^{7}
(United Kingdom) K Edmund | 6 | 3 | 6^{1}
(Czech Republic) J Pospíšil | 0 | 6^{3}
(Croatia) K Mesaroš | 6 | 7^{7}

Quarterfinals
1 | (Russia) A Kuznetsov | 6^{5} | 1
5 | (Romania) A Ungur | 7^{7} | 6
3 | (Slovenia) A Bedene | 4 | 6 | 6
(Croatia) K Mesaroš | 6 | 4 | 4

Semifinals
5 | (Romania) A Ungur | 7^{7} | 0
3 | (Slovenia) A Bedene | 6^{3} | 0^{r}

=== Bottom half ===
First round
8 | (Serbia) D Lajović | 6 | 6
(Netherlands) T Schoorel | 1 | 1
WC | (Slovenia) M Urbanija | 3 | 1
(Slovakia) N Gombos | 6 | 6
(Spain) E López Pérez | 1 | 2
WC | (Czech Republic) P Červenák | 6 | 6
(Italy) A Brizzi | 2 | 1
4 | (Germany) J Reister | 6 | 6
7 | (France) S Robert | 6 | 6
(Italy) S Vagnozzi | 4 | 4
(Slovakia) Adrian Sikora | 2 | 3
(Bosnia and Herzegovina) D Džumhur | 6 | 6
WC | (Czech Republic) Martin Přikryl | 0 | 0^{r}
Q | (Netherlands) A van der Duim | 6 | 3
Q | (Italy) R Bellotti | 5 | 6 | 0
2 | (Czech Republic) J Hájek | 7 | 3 | 6

Second round
8 | (Serbia) D Lajović | 3 | 1
(Slovakia) N Gombos | 6 | 6
WC | (Czech Republic) P Červenák | 3 | 7 | 3
4 | (Germany) J Reister | 6 | 5 | 6
7 | (France) S Robert | 6 | 7
(Bosnia and Herzegovina) D Džumhur | 1 | 5
Q | (Netherlands) A van der Duim | 2 | 2
2 | (Czech Republic) J Hájek | 6 | 6

Quarterfinals
(Slovakia) N Gombos | 5 | 2
4 | (Germany) J Reister | 7 | 6
7 | (France) S Robert | 6_{4} | 6 | 4
2 | (Czech Republic) J Hájek | 7^{7} | 3 | 0^{r}

Semifinals
4 | (Germany) J Reister | 4 | 6 | 6
7 | (France) S Robert | 6 | 4 | 4
