= 2013 Arimex Challenger Trophy – Doubles =

Doubles
- 2013 Arimex Challenger Trophy

Final
- Champions: (Croatia) Marin Draganja (Croatia) Mate Pavić
- Runners-up: (Slovenia) Aljaž Bedene (Czech Republic) Jaroslav Pospíšil
- Score: 7–5, 4–6, [10–6]

Events
| Singles | Doubles |
| ← 2012 · | Arimex Challenger Trophy | · 2014 → |

Nikola Ćirić and Goran Tošić were the defending champions, but chose not to compete this year.
The top two seeds competed for the title, where Marin Draganja and Mate Pavić defeated Aljaž Bedene and Jaroslav Pospíšil 7–5, 4–6, [10–6]

== Seeds ==
1. (Croatia) Marin Draganja / (Croatia) Mate Pavić (champions)
2. (Slovenia) Aljaž Bedene / (Czech Republic) Jaroslav Pospíšil (final)
3. (Germany) Gero Kretschmer / (Germany) Alexander Satschko (semifinals)
4. (Netherlands) Antal van der Duim / (Netherlands) Boy Westerhof (first round)

== Draw ==
=== Key ===
- Q = Qualifier
- WC = Wild card
- LL = Lucky loser
- Alt = Alternate
- SE = Special exempt
- PR = Protected ranking
- ITF = ITF entry
- JE = Junior exempt
- w/o = Walkover
- r = Retired
- d = Defaulted
- SR = Special ranking

=== Draw ===
First round
1 | (Croatia) M Draganja (Croatia) M Pavić | 6 | 6
WC | (Slovakia) Oliver Nagy (Slovakia) Jakub Oravec | 1 | 1
(Spain) E López Pérez (Croatia) A Pavić | 3 | 3
(Italy) A Brizzi (Italy) S Vagnozzi | 6 | 6
3 | (Germany) G Kretschmer (Germany) A Satschko | 6 | 4 | [10]
(Czech Republic) J Hájek (Czech Republic) J Levinský | 3 | 6 | [7]
(Slovakia) I Klec (Slovakia) A Martin | 6 | 6
(Slovakia) K Čapkovič (Slovakia) M Semjan | 1 | 3
WC | (Czech Republic) Martin Přikryl (Czech Republic) Libor Salaba | 2 | 1
(Slovakia) P Červenák (Romania) A Ungur | 6 | 6
WC | (Slovakia) N Gombos (Czech Republic) A Pavlásek | 6 | 6
4 | (Netherlands) A van der Duim (Netherlands) B Westerhof | 4 | 3
(Serbia) N Ćaćić (Serbia) D Lajović | 6 | 6
(Bosnia and Herzegovina) D Džumhur (Croatia) K Mesaroš | 4 | 3
(Belgium) S Darcis (Netherlands) S Groen | 4 | 2
2 | (Slovenia) A Bedene (Czech Republic) J Pospíšil | 6 | 6

Quarterfinals
1 | (Croatia) M Draganja (Croatia) M Pavić | 6 | 6
(Italy) A Brizzi (Italy) S Vagnozzi | 1 | 2
3 | (Germany) G Kretschmer (Germany) A Satschko | 6 | 6
(Slovakia) I Klec (Slovakia) A Martin | 1 | 0
(Slovakia) P Červenák (Romania) A Ungur | 6^{5} | 6 | [10]
WC | (Slovakia) N Gombos (Czech Republic) A Pavlásek | 7^{7} | 1 | [2]
(Serbia) N Ćaćić (Serbia) D Lajović | 4 | 6 | [9]
2 | (Slovenia) A Bedene (Czech Republic) J Pospíšil | 6 | 3 | [11]

Semifinals
1 | (Croatia) M Draganja (Croatia) M Pavić | 6^{4} | 6 | [10]
3 | (Germany) G Kretschmer (Germany) A Satschko | 7^{6} | 4 | [8]
(Slovakia) P Červenák (Romania) A Ungur | 3 | 3
2 | (Slovenia) A Bedene (Czech Republic) J Pospíšil | 6 | 6

Final
1 | (Croatia) M Draganja (Croatia) M Pavić | 7 | 4 | [10]
2 | (Slovenia) A Bedene (Czech Republic) J Pospíšil | 5 | 6 | [6]
