= 2009 ATP Challenger Trophy – Doubles =

Doubles
- 2009 ATP Challenger Trophy

Final
- Champions: (Bulgaria) Grigor Dimitrov (Russia) Teymuraz Gabashvili
- Runners-up: (Czech Republic) Jan Minář (Czech Republic) Lukáš Rosol
- Score: 6–4, 2–6, [10–8]

Events
Singles	Doubles
- ATP Challenger Trophy

David Škoch and Igor Zelenay were the defending champions, but they chose to not compete this year.
Grigor Dimitrov and Teymuraz Gabashvili defeated Jan Minář and Lukáš Rosol 6–4, 2–6, [10–8] in the final.

== Seeds ==
1. (Ukraine) Sergei Bubka / (Ukraine) Sergiy Stakhovsky (semifinals)
2. (Poland) Dawid Olejniczak / (India) Purav Raja (first round)
3. (Czech Republic) Dušan Karol / (Kazakhstan) Yuri Schukin (first round)
4. (Czech Republic) Jaroslav Pospíšil / (Czech Republic) Pavel Šnobel (first round)

== Draw ==
Key

- Q = Qualifier
- WC = Wild card
- LL = Lucky loser
- Alt = Alternate
- ITF = ITF entry
- PR = Protected ranking
- SR = Special ranking
- SE = Special exempt
- JE = Junior exempt
- JR = Junior Accelerator Programme entrant
- CO = College Accelerator Programme entrant
- NG = Next Gen Accelerator Program entrant
- w/o = Walkover
- r = Retired
- d = Defaulted

=== Draw ===
First round
1	(Ukraine) S Bubka (Ukraine) S Stakhovsky	7	7
(Romania) C Gârd (Algeria) L Ouahab	5	5
(Ukraine) O Dolgopolov Jr. (Ukraine) A Smirnov	6	6
(Poland) G Panfil (Ukraine) I Sergeyev	2	3
4	(Czech Republic) J Pospíšil (Czech Republic) P Šnobel	1	4
(Slovakia) D Hrbatý (Slovakia) M Kližan	6	6
WC	(Czech Republic) R Jebavý (Slovakia) A Martin	6^{4}	7	[5]
(Bulgaria) G Dimitrov (Russia) T Gabashvili	7	6^{3}	[10]
(Czech Republic) J Minář (Czech Republic) L Rosol	6	6
WC	(Slovakia) V Farkas (Slovakia) F Vittek	0	1
(Italy) A Brizzi (Spain) D Marrero	6^{4}	6	[10]
3	(Czech Republic) D Karol (Kazakhstan) Y Schukin	7	4	[7]
WC	(Slovakia) J Krošlák (Slovakia) M Semjan	3	7	[6]
(Germany) T Kamke (Germany) J Reister	6	6^{5}	[10]
(Slovakia) K Čapkovič (Slovakia) P Červenák	6	3	[12]
2	(Poland) D Olejniczak (India) P Raja	4	6	[10]

Quarterfinals
1	(Ukraine) S Bubka (Ukraine) S Stakhovsky	6	6
(Ukraine) O Dolgopolov Jr. (Ukraine) A Smirnov	3	2
(Slovakia) D Hrbatý (Slovakia) M Kližan	2	2
(Bulgaria) G Dimitrov (Russia) T Gabashvili	6	6
(Czech Republic) J Minář (Czech Republic) L Rosol	w/o
(Italy) A Brizzi (Spain) D Marrero
(Germany) T Kamke (Germany) J Reister
(Slovakia) K Čapkovič (Slovakia) P Červenák	w/o

Semifinals
1	(Ukraine) S Bubka (Ukraine) S Stakhovsky	7	4	[8]
(Bulgaria) G Dimitrov (Russia) T Gabashvili	6^{12}	6	[10]
(Czech Republic) J Minář (Czech Republic) L Rosol	2	6	[10]
(Slovakia) K Čapkovič (Slovakia) P Červenák	6	2	[6]

Finals
(Bulgaria) G Dimitrov (Russia) T Gabashvili	6	2	[10]
(Czech Republic) J Minář (Czech Republic) L Rosol	4	6	[8]
