= 2009 ATP Challenger Trophy – Singles =

Singles
- 2009 ATP Challenger Trophy

Final
- Champion: (Ukraine) Oleksandr Dolgopolov Jr.
- Runner-up: (Algeria) Lamine Ouahab
- Score: 6–2, 6–2

Events
Singles	Doubles
- ATP Challenger Trophy

Alberto Martín didn't try to defend his 2008 title.
Oleksandr Dolgopolov Jr. won the tournament, by defeating Lamine Ouahab 6–2, 6–2 in the final.

== Seeds ==
1. (Russia) Teymuraz Gabashvili (semifinals)
2. (Algeria) Lamine Ouahab (final)
3. (Czech Republic) Jan Hájek (quarterfinals)
4. (Ukraine) Sergiy Stakhovsky (semifinals)
5. (Slovakia) Dominik Hrbatý (quarterfinals)
6. (Germany) Julian Reister (second round)
7. (Ukraine) Oleksandr Dolgopolov Jr. (champion)
8. (Czech Republic) Jiří Vaněk (second round, retired due to a lower back)

== Draw ==
Key

- Q = Qualifier
- WC = Wild card
- LL = Lucky loser
- Alt = Alternate
- ITF = ITF entry
- PR = Protected ranking
- SR = Special ranking
- SE = Special exempt
- JE = Junior exempt
- JR = Junior Accelerator Programme entrant
- CO = College Accelerator Programme entrant
- NG = Next Gen Accelerator Program entrant
- w/o = Walkover
- r = Retired
- d = Defaulted

=== Final four ===
Semifinals
1	(Russia) Teymuraz Gabashvili	4	2
7	(Ukraine) Oleksandr Dolgopolov Jr.	6	6
4	(Ukraine) Sergiy Stakhovsky	5	7	3
2	(Algeria) Lamine Ouahab	7	6^{5}	6

Final
7	(Ukraine) Oleksandr Dolgopolov Jr.	6	6
2	(Algeria) Lamine Ouahab	2	2

=== Top half ===
First round
1	(Russia) T Gabashvili	6	6
(Czech Republic) J Pospíšil	4	0
(Czech Republic) L Rosol	6	7
(Czech Republic) J Minář	4	6^{0}
(Slovakia) M Kližan	3	6	2
(Italy) A Brizzi	6	2	6
(Spain) D Marrero	4	3
5	(Slovakia) D Hrbatý	6	6
3	(Czech Republic) J Hájek	7	6
(Ukraine) S Bubka	6^{1}	4
(Bulgaria) G Dimitrov	6	6
(Slovakia) K Čapkovič	3	0
WC	(Czech Republic) B Ulihrach	4	2
(Slovakia) P Červenák	6	6
(Kazakhstan) Y Schukin	5	1
7	(Ukraine) O Dolgopolov Jr.	7	6

Second round
1	(Russia) T Gabashvili	1	7	6
(Czech Republic) L Rosol	6	6^{6}	4
(Italy) A Brizzi	7	4	3
5	(Slovakia) D Hrbatý	6^{4}	6	6
3	(Czech Republic) J Hájek	6	6
(Bulgaria) G Dimitrov	3	4
(Slovakia) P Červenák	2	4
7	(Ukraine) O Dolgopolov Jr.	6	6

Quarterfinals
1	(Russia) T Gabashvili	6	6
5	(Slovakia) D Hrbatý	3	2
3	(Czech Republic) J Hájek	6	2	2
7	(Ukraine) O Dolgopolov Jr.	3	6	6

Semifinals
1	(Russia) T Gabashvili	4	2
7	(Ukraine) O Dolgopolov Jr.	6	6

=== Bottom half ===
First round
6	(Germany) J Reister	6	6
(Czech Republic) P Šnobel	4	4
(Czech Republic) R Vik	6	2	4
(Germany) T Kamke	4	6	6
(Germany) M Bachinger	6	1
(Ukraine) I Sergeyev	1	0	r
Q	(Slovakia) A Martin	1	4
4	(Ukraine) S Stakhovsky	6	6
8	(Czech Republic) J Vaněk	6	6
Q	(Poland) G Panfil	2	0
(Ukraine) A Smirnov	0	5
WC	(Slovakia) M Semjan	6	7
Q	(Romania) C Gârd	6	6
WC	(Austria) L Weinhandl	1	1
Q	(Hungary) G Balázs	3	5
2	(Algeria) L Ouahab	6	7

Second round
6	(Germany) J Reister	6	2	3
(Germany) T Kamke	4	6	6
(Germany) M Bachinger	7	3	2
4	(Ukraine) S Stakhovsky	6^{2}	6	6
8	(Czech Republic) J Vaněk	6	5	1^{r}
WC	(Slovakia) M Semjan	4	7	3
Q	(Romania) C Gârd	6^{3}	0	r
2	(Algeria) L Ouahab	7	3

Quarterfinals
(Germany) T Kamke	2	6	3
4	(Ukraine) S Stakhovsky	6	1	6
WC	(Slovakia) M Semjan	2	6^{6}
2	(Algeria) L Ouahab	6	7

Semifinals
4	(Ukraine) S Stakhovsky	5	7	3
2	(Algeria) L Ouahab	7	6^{5}	6
