= 2010 Due Ponti Cup – Singles =

Singles
- 2010 Due Ponti Cup

Final
- Champion: (Italy) Filippo Volandri
- Runner-up: (Morocco) Reda El Amrani
- Score: 6–3, 6–2

Events
Singles	Doubles
← 2009 ·	Due Ponti Cup	· 2011 →

Filippo Volandri won the inaugural edition of Due Ponti Cup. He defeated Reda El Amrani 6–3, 6–2 in the final.

== Seeds ==
1. (Brazil) Ricardo Mello (second round)
2. (Italy) Paolo Lorenzi (first round)
3. (Italy) Filippo Volandri (champion)
4. (Brazil) João Souza (second round)
5. (Italy) Simone Bolelli (quarterfinals)
6. (Argentina) Máximo González (first round)
7. (Romania) Victor Crivoi (quarterfinals)
8. (Romania) Adrian Ungur (semifinals)

== Draw ==
=== Key ===
- Q = Qualifier
- WC = Wild card
- LL = Lucky loser
- Alt = Alternate
- SE = Special exempt
- PR = Protected ranking
- ITF = ITF entry
- JE = Junior exempt
- w/o = Walkover
- r = Retired
- d = Defaulted
- SR = Special ranking

=== Finals ===
Semifinals
(Croatia) Antonio Veić	2	6	4
3	(Italy) Filippo Volandri	6	0	6
(Morocco) Reda El Amrani	6	6
8	(Romania) Adrian Ungur	1	1

Final
3	(Italy) Filippo Volandri	6	6
(Morocco) Reda El Amrani	3	2

=== Top half ===
First round
1	(Brazil) R Mello	7	6
Q	(Italy) A Brizzi	5	3
(Croatia) A Veić	6	3	6
(Italy) A Arnaboldi	3	6	2
(Slovakia) P Červenák	1	5
Q	(Italy) D Giorgini	6	7
(Monaco) B Balleret	6	5	2
7	(Romania) V Crivoi	1	7	6
3	(Italy) F Volandri	6	1	6
(Brazil) C Zampieri	4	6	3
WC	(Italy) F Aldi	3	6	1
WC	(Mexico) S González	6	2	6
(United States) A Bogomolov Jr.	4	4
ALT	(Argentina) M Alund	6	6
LL	(Egypt) K Maamoun	4	1
5	(Italy) S Bolelli	6	6

Second round
1	(Brazil) R Mello	6	6^{2}	1
(Croatia) A Veić	3	7	6
Q	(Italy) D Giorgini	6	2	4
7	(Romania) V Crivoi	3	6	6
3	(Italy) F Volandri	7	6
WC	(Mexico) S González	6^{5}	1
ALT	(Argentina) M Alund	6^{4}	4
5	(Italy) S Bolelli	7	6

Quarterfinals
(Croatia) A Veić	6	6
7	(Romania) V Crivoi	4	3
3	(Italy) F Volandri	6	7
5	(Italy) S Bolelli	1	6^{5}

Semifinals
(Croatia) A Veić	2	6	4
3	(Italy) F Volandri	6	0	6

=== Bottom half ===
First round
6	(Argentina) M González	5	7	3
(Morocco) R El Amrani	7	6^{7}	6
(United States) J Witten	6	6
Q	(Argentina) G Pella	2	1
(Italy) S Galvani	3	0
(Czech Republic) D Lojda	6	6
Q	(Argentina) F Bagnis	3	6	3
4	(Brazil) J Souza	6	3	6
8	(Romania) A Ungur	6	7
WC	(Italy) T Fabbiano	3	5
(Italy) S Vagnozzi	6	7
(Brazil) R Hocevar	1	6^{5}
(Argentina) C Berlocq	6	6
(Spain) I Cervantes-Huegun	1	1
WC	(Italy) M Crugnola	7	3	6
2	(Italy) P Lorenzi	5	6	4

Second round
(Morocco) R El Amrani	6^{5}	7	6
(United States) J Witten	7	6^{4}	4
(Czech Republic) D Lojda	6	7
4	(Brazil) J Souza	4	5
8	(Romania) A Ungur	6	4	6
(Italy) S Vagnozzi	1	6	4
(Argentina) C Berlocq	6	4	7
WC	(Italy) M Crugnola	0	6	6^{5}

Quarterfinals
(Morocco) R El Amrani	2	6	6
(Czech Republic) D Lojda	6	1	4
8	(Romania) A Ungur	6	7
(Argentina) C Berlocq	4	5

Semifinals
(Morocco) R El Amrani	6	6
8	(Romania) A Ungur	1	1
