= 2011 ATP Challenger Trophy – Doubles =

Doubles
- 2011 ATP Challenger Trophy

Final
- Champions: (Australia) Colin Ebelthite (Czech Republic) Jaroslav Pospíšil
- Runners-up: (Belarus) Alexander Bury (Belarus) Andrei Vasilevski
- Score: 6–3, 6–4

Events
Singles	Doubles
← 2010 ·	ATP Challenger Trophy	· 2012 →

Karol Beck and Lukáš Rosol were the defending champions, but decided not to participate.
Colin Ebelthite and Jaroslav Pospíšil won the title, defeating Alexander Bury and Andrei Vasilevski 6–3, 6–4 in the final.

== Seeds ==
1. (Germany) Dustin Brown / (United Kingdom) Ken Skupski (first round)
2. (Australia) Adam Feeney / (Czech Republic) David Škoch (first round)
3. (Australia) Colin Ebelthite / (Czech Republic) Jaroslav Pospíšil (champions)
4. (Germany) Gero Kretschmer / (Germany) Björn Phau (semifinals)

== Draw ==
=== Key ===
- Q = Qualifier
- WC = Wild card
- LL = Lucky loser
- Alt = Alternate
- SE = Special exempt
- PR = Protected ranking
- ITF = ITF entry
- JE = Junior exempt
- w/o = Walkover
- r = Retired
- d = Defaulted
- SR = Special ranking

=== Draw ===
First round
1	(Germany) D Brown (United Kingdom) K Skupski	6	3	[6]
(Belarus) A Bury (Belarus) A Vasilevski	3	6	[10]
(Slovakia) Norbert Gomboš (Slovakia) A Martin	5	1
(Moldova) R Albot (Portugal) J Sousa	7	6
4	(Germany) G Kretschmer (Germany) B Phau	6	6
(Spain) I Cervantes-Huegun (Brazil) F Romboli	3	4
(Poland) T Bednarek (Poland) M Gawron	2	4
WC	(Czech Republic) J Hájek (Czech Republic) Jan Subota	6	6
WC	(Slovakia) Jozef Kovalík (Slovakia) Filip Vittek	6	7
Alt	(Slovakia) Filip Havaj (Slovakia) Peter Miklušičák	4	5
(Slovakia) P Červenák (Slovakia) I Klec	1	7^{7}	[8]
3	(Australia) C Ebelthite (Czech Republic) J Pospíšil	6	6^{5}	[10]
WC	(Czech Republic) R Jebavý (Austria) Tristan-Samuel Weiβborn	4	2
(Spain) G Granollers (Spain) G Olaso	6	6
(Czech Republic) D Lojda (Kazakhstan) Y Schukin	4	6	[10]
2	(Australia) A Feeney (Czech Republic) D Škoch	6	2	[5]

Quarterfinals
(Belarus) A Bury (Belarus) A Vasilevski	4	6	[12]
(Moldova) R Albot (Portugal) J Sousa	6	4	[10]
4	(Germany) G Kretschmer (Germany) B Phau	7^{7}	6
WC	(Czech Republic) J Hájek (Czech Republic) Jan Subota	6^{2}	0
WC	(Slovakia) Jozef Kovalík (Slovakia) Filip Vittek	5	0
3	(Australia) C Ebelthite (Czech Republic) J Pospíšil	7	6
(Spain) G Granollers (Spain) G Olaso	7^{7}	6
(Czech Republic) D Lojda (Kazakhstan) Y Schukin	6^{2}	3

Semifinals
(Belarus) A Bury (Belarus) A Vasilevski	5	7^{7}	[10]
4	(Germany) G Kretschmer (Germany) B Phau	7	6^{2}	[6]
3	(Australia) C Ebelthite (Czech Republic) J Pospíšil	6	6
(Spain) G Granollers (Spain) G Olaso	1	4

Final
(Belarus) A Bury (Belarus) A Vasilevski	3	4
3	(Australia) C Ebelthite (Czech Republic) J Pospíšil	6	6
