= 2010 ATP Challenger Trophy – Doubles =

Doubles
- 2010 ATP Challenger Trophy

Final
- Champions: (Slovakia) Karol Beck (Czech Republic) Lukáš Rosol
- Runners-up: (Austria) Alexander Peya (Austria) Martin Slanar
- Score: 4–6, 7–6(3), [10–8]

Events
Singles	Doubles
- ATP Challenger Trophy

Grigor Dimitrov and Teymuraz Gabashvili were the defending champions, but decided not to participate.
Karol Beck and Lukáš Rosol won in the final 4–6, 7–6(3), [10–8], against Alexander Peya and Martin Slanar.

== Seeds ==
1. (Austria) Alexander Peya / (Austria) Martin Slanar (final)
2. (India) Harsh Mankad / (Spain) Guillermo Olaso (semifinals)
3. (Slovakia) Karol Beck / (Czech Republic) Lukáš Rosol (champions)
4. (Austria) Rainer Eitzinger / (Austria) Bertram Steinberger (first round)

== Draw ==
Key

- Q = Qualifier
- WC = Wild card
- LL = Lucky loser
- Alt = Alternate
- ITF = ITF entry
- PR = Protected ranking
- SR = Special ranking
- SE = Special exempt
- JE = Junior exempt
- JR = Junior Accelerator Programme entrant
- CO = College Accelerator Programme entrant
- NG = Next Gen Accelerator Program entrant
- w/o = Walkover
- r = Retired
- d = Defaulted

=== Draw ===
First round
1	(Austria) A Peya (Austria) M Slanar	6	6
(Slovakia) K Čapkovič (Slovakia) N Gombos	4	0
(Slovakia) D Hrbatý (Czech Republic) D Lojda	5	2
(Slovakia) M Mečíř Jr. (Slovakia) M Semjan	7	6
4	(Austria) R Eitzinger (Austria) B Steinberger	1	2
(Spain) G Alcaide (Spain) Ó Hernández	6	6
(Slovakia) A Martin (Ukraine) I Sergeyev	4	3
WC	(Slovakia) Marko Daniš (Czech Republic) J Krkoška	6	6
(Czech Republic) J Hernych (Czech Republic) J Pospíšil	6^{3}	6	[10]
(Austria) M Raditschnigg (Russia) V Rudnev	7	2	[6]
WC	(Slovakia) M Pažický (Slovakia) Adrian Sikora	6	3	[7]
3	(Slovakia) K Beck (Czech Republic) L Rosol	4	6	[10]
(Slovakia) P Červenák (Slovakia) I Klec	7	4	[10]
PR	(Italy) A Brizzi (Italy) F Colangelo	6^{8}	6	[7]
WC	(Czech Republic) M Konečný (Czech Republic) R Urbanek	4	2
2	(India) H Mankad (Spain) G Olaso	6	6

Quarterfinals
1	(Austria) A Peya (Austria) M Slanar	7	7
(Slovakia) M Mečíř Jr. (Slovakia) M Semjan	5	6^{9}
(Spain) G Alcaide (Spain) Ó Hernández	w/o
WC	(Slovakia) Marko Daniš (Czech Republic) J Krkoška
(Czech Republic) J Hernych (Czech Republic) J Pospíšil	6^{5}	3
3	(Slovakia) K Beck (Czech Republic) L Rosol	7	6
(Slovakia) P Červenák (Slovakia) I Klec	5	1
2	(India) H Mankad (Spain) G Olaso	7	6

Semifinals
1	(Austria) A Peya (Austria) M Slanar	6	6
WC	(Slovakia) Marko Daniš (Czech Republic) J Krkoška	0	0
3	(Slovakia) K Beck (Czech Republic) L Rosol	6	4	[10]
2	(India) H Mankad (Spain) G Olaso	1	6	[7]

Final
1	(Austria) A Peya (Austria) M Slanar	6	6^{3}	[8]
3	(Slovakia) K Beck (Czech Republic) L Rosol	4	7	[10]
