= 2012 Arimex Challenger Trophy – Singles =

Singles
- 2012 Arimex Challenger Trophy

Final
- Champion: (Russia) Andrey Kuznetsov
- Runner-up: (Romania) Adrian Ungur
- Score: 6–3, 6–3

Events
Singles	Doubles
← 2011 ·	Arimex Challenger Trophy	· 2013 →

Íñigo Cervantes-Huegun was the defending champion but chose not to compete.
Andrey Kuznetsov won the title after defeating Adrian Ungur 6–3, 6–3 in the final.

== Seeds ==
1. (Czech Republic) Lukáš Rosol (second round)
2. (Romania) Adrian Ungur (final)
3. (Portugal) João Sousa (semifinals)
4. (Austria) Andreas Haider-Maurer (quarterfinals)
5. (Russia) Andrey Kuznetsov (champion)
6. (Croatia) Antonio Veić (first round)
7. (Chile) Paul Capdeville (first round, retired because of a right groin injury)
8. (Italy) Matteo Viola (semifinals)

== Draw ==
=== Key ===
- Q = Qualifier
- WC = Wild card
- LL = Lucky loser
- Alt = Alternate
- ITF = ITF entry
- PR = Protected ranking
- SR = Special ranking
- SE = Special exempt
- JE = Junior exempt
- JR = Junior Accelerator Programme entrant
- CO = College Accelerator Programme entrant
- NG = Next Gen Accelerator Program entrant
- w/o = Walkover
- r = Retired
- d = Defaulted

=== Finals ===
Semifinals
5	(Russia) Andrey Kuznetsov	6	6
3	(Portugal) João Sousa	3	0
8	(Italy) Matteo Viola	6^{3}	3
2	(Romania) Adrian Ungur	7^{7}	6

Final
5	(Russia) Andrey Kuznetsov	6	6
2	(Romania) Adrian Ungur	3	3

=== Top half ===
First round
1	(Czech Republic) L Rosol	7^{7}	6
(Slovakia) P Červenák	6^{2}	2
(Austria) M Fischer	1^{r}
PR	(Germany) J Reister	5
Q	(Italy) W Trusendi	6^{5}	6	7
WC	(Slovakia) N Gomboš	7^{7}	4	5
Q	(Canada) S Diez	4	3
5	(Russia) A Kuznetsov	6	6
3	(Portugal) J Sousa	1	6	6
(Austria) P Oswald	6	2	1
(Spain) I Navarro	6	6
(Italy) S Vagnozzi	3	2
WC	(Austria) N Reissig	0	2
Q	(Czech Republic) D Lojda	6	6
Q	(France) S Robert	6	1	7
6	(Croatia) A Veić	2	6	5

Second round
1	(Czech Republic) L Rosol	6	3	2
PR	(Germany) J Reister	4	6	6
Q	(Italy) W Trusendi	0	2
5	(Russia) A Kuznetsov	6	6
3	(Portugal) J Sousa	6	6
(Spain) I Navarro	2	4
Q	(Czech Republic) D Lojda	2	1
Q	(France) S Robert	6	6

Quarterfinals
PR	(Germany) J Reister	5	6^{4}
5	(Russia) A Kuznetsov	7	7^{7}
3	(Portugal) J Sousa	6^{3}	6	7
Q	(France) S Robert	7^{7}	3	5

Semifinals
5	(Russia) A Kuznetsov	6	6
3	(Portugal) J Sousa	3	0

=== Bottom half ===
First round
8	(Italy) M Viola	6	6
(Austria) M Linzer	3	1
(Netherlands) B Westerhof	0	0^{r}
(Spain) J Martí	6	1
WC	(Slovakia) Adrian Sikora	5	1
(Portugal) P Sousa	7	6
(Australia) J Duckworth	6^{4}	1
4	(Austria) A Haider-Maurer	7	6
7	(Chile) P Capdeville	2	0^{r}
(Bosnia and Herzegovina) D Džumhur	6	0
(Slovakia) A Martin	7^{7}	6
WC	(Germany) R Kern	6^{1}	3
(Slovakia) K Čapkovič	6	6
SE	(Australia) J Kubler	4	3
SE	(Croatia) N Mektić	4	6	4
2	(Romania) A Ungur	6	2	6

Second round
8	(Italy) M Viola	7^{7}	7^{9}
(Spain) J Martí	6^{1}	6^{7}
(Portugal) P Sousa	5	7	1
4	(Austria) A Haider-Maurer	7	5	6
(Bosnia and Herzegovina) D Džumhur	4	6	2
(Slovakia) A Martin	6	3	6
(Slovakia) K Čapkovič	1	2
2	(Romania) A Ungur	6	6

Quarterfinals
8	(Italy) M Viola	6	6
4	(Austria) A Haider-Maurer	4	2
(Slovakia) A Martin	1	6	4
2	(Romania) A Ungur	6	3	6

Semifinals
8	(Italy) M Viola	6^{3}	3
2	(Romania) A Ungur	7^{7}	6
