= 2010 Due Ponti Cup – Doubles =

Doubles
- 2010 Due Ponti Cup

Final
- Champions: (Mexico) Santiago González (United States) Travis Rettenmaier
- Runners-up: (Australia) Sadik Kadir (India) Purav Raja
- Score: 6–2, 6–4

Events
Singles	Doubles
← 2009 ·	Due Ponti Cup	· 2011 →

Santiago González and Travis Rettenmaier became the first champions of this tournament, after their 6–2, 6–4 win against Sadik Kadir and Purav Raja in the final.

== Seeds ==
1. (Mexico) Santiago González / (United States) Travis Rettenmaier (champions)
2. (Australia) Sadik Kadir / (India) Purav Raja (finals)
3. (Argentina) Diego Álvarez / (Brazil) Rogerio Dutra da Silva (first round)
4. (Brazil) Ricardo Hocevar / (Brazil) João Souza (semifinals)

== Draw ==
=== Key ===
- Q = Qualifier
- WC = Wild card
- LL = Lucky loser
- Alt = Alternate
- SE = Special exempt
- PR = Protected ranking
- ITF = ITF entry
- JE = Junior exempt
- w/o = Walkover
- r = Retired
- d = Defaulted
- SR = Special ranking

=== Draw ===
First round
1	(Mexico) S González (United States) T Rettenmaier	7	6
(Spain) I Cervantes-Huegun (Brazil) M Torres	5	2
(Argentina) M González (Brazil) C Zampieri	4	6^{4}
(Morocco) R El Amrani (Colombia) A González	6	7
4	(Brazil) R Hocevar (Brazil) J Souza	6	6
WC	(Italy) T Fabbiano (Italy) G Naso	4	3
(Italy) S Galvani (Italy) S Vagnozzi	7	6
(Monaco) B Balleret (Czech Republic) D Lojda	6^{4}	4
WC	(France) O Charroin (France) A Renard	6	6
(Romania) V Crivoi (Egypt) K Maamoun	3	3
(Argentina) M Alund (Slovakia) P Červenák	3	6	[11]
3	(Argentina) D Álvarez (Brazil) R Dutra da Silva	6	3	[9]
(Serbia) F Krajinović (Croatia) A Veić
(United States) A Bogomolov Jr. (United States) J Witten	w/o
WC	(Italy) F Aldi (Italy) D Giorgini	2	4
2	(Australia) S Kadir (India) P Raja	6	6

Quarterfinals
1	(Mexico) S González (United States) T Rettenmaier	6	6
(Morocco) R El Amrani (Colombia) A González	3	4
4	(Brazil) R Hocevar (Brazil) J Souza	6	7
(Italy) S Galvani (Italy) S Vagnozzi	3	6^{4}
WC	(France) O Charroin (France) A Renard	6	6
(Argentina) M Alund (Slovakia) P Červenák	1	4
(United States) A Bogomolov Jr. (United States) J Witten	1	0	r
2	(Australia) S Kadir (India) P Raja	6	4

Semifinals
1	(Mexico) S González (United States) T Rettenmaier	6	6^{5}	[10]
4	(Brazil) R Hocevar (Brazil) J Souza	2	7	[8]
WC	(France) O Charroin (France) A Renard	4	6	[3]
2	(Australia) S Kadir (India) P Raja	6	3	[10]

Finals
1	(Mexico) S González (United States) T Rettenmaier	6	6
2	(Australia) S Kadir (India) P Raja	2	4
