= 2013 Arimex Challenger Trophy =

- Date: 14–22 September
- Edition: 7th
- Surface: Clay
- Location: Trnava, Slovakia

Champions

Singles
- (Germany) Julian Reister

Doubles
- (Croatia) Marin Draganja / (Croatia) Mate Pavić
← 2012 ·	Arimex Challenger Trophy	· 2014 →

The 2013 Arimex ATP Challenger Trophy was a professional tennis tournament played on clay courts. It was the seventh edition of the tournament which was part of the 2013 ATP Challenger Tour. It took place at the TC EMPIRE in Trnava, Slovakia from 14 to 22 September 2013, including the qualifying competition on the first two days.

== Singles main draw entrants ==
=== Seeds ===
Country	Player	Rank	Seed
RUS	Andrey Kuznetsov	83	1
CZE	Jan Hájek	103	2
SVN	Aljaž Bedene	107	3
GER	Julian Reister	109	4
ROM	Adrian Ungur	117	5
SVK	Andrej Martin	120	6
FRA	Stéphane Robert	133	7
SRB	Dušan Lajović	142	8

=== Other entrants ===
The following players received wildcards into the singles main draw:

- (Slovakia) Pavol Červenák
- (Czech Republic) Adam Pavlásek
- (Czech Republic) Martin Přikryl
- (Slovenia) Mike Urbanija

The following players received entry from the qualifying draw:

- (Italy) Riccardo Bellotti
- (Austria) Pascal Brunner
- (Serbia) Nikola Čačić
- (Netherlands) Antal van der Duim

== Champions ==
=== Singles ===
- (Germany) Julian Reister def. (Romania) Adrian Ungur 7–6^{(7–3)}, 6–3

=== Doubles ===
- (Croatia) Marin Draganja / (Croatia) Mate Pavić def. (Slovenia) Aljaž Bedene / (Czech Republic) Jaroslav Pospíšil 7–5, 4–6, [10–6]
