= 2010 ATP Challenger Trophy – Singles =

Singles
- 2010 ATP Challenger Trophy

Final
- Champion: (Czech Republic) Jaroslav Pospíšil
- Runner-up: (Kazakhstan) Yuri Schukin
- Score: 6–4, 4–6, 6–3

Events
Singles	Doubles
- ATP Challenger Trophy

Alexandr Dolgopolov decided not to defend his 2009 title.
Jaroslav Pospíšil won the final against Yuri Schukin 6–4, 4–6, 6–3.

== Seeds ==
1. (Czech Republic) Jan Hájek (first round, retired)
2. (Slovakia) Karol Beck (first round)
3. (Kazakhstan) Yuri Schukin (final)
4. (France) Benoît Paire (first round)
5. (Austria) Stefan Koubek (semifinals)
6. (Czech Republic) Lukáš Rosol (quarterfinals)
7. (Spain) Óscar Hernández (second round)
8. (Czech Republic) Dušan Lojda (semifinals)

== Draw ==
Key

- Q = Qualifier
- WC = Wild card
- LL = Lucky loser
- Alt = Alternate
- ITF = ITF entry
- PR = Protected ranking
- SR = Special ranking
- SE = Special exempt
- JE = Junior exempt
- JR = Junior Accelerator Programme entrant
- CO = College Accelerator Programme entrant
- NG = Next Gen Accelerator Program entrant
- w/o = Walkover
- r = Retired
- d = Defaulted

=== Finals ===
Semifinals
5	(Austria) Stefan Koubek	6	3	3
3	(Kazakhstan) Yuri Schukin	4	6	6
(Czech Republic) Jaroslav Pospíšil	7	6
8	(Czech Republic) Dušan Lojda	5	2

Final
3	(Kazakhstan) Yuri Schukin	4	6	3
(Czech Republic) Jaroslav Pospíšil	6	4	6

=== Top half ===
First round
1	(Czech Republic) J Hájek	6^{10}	r
(Serbia) F Krajinović	7
(Ecuador) G Lapentti	5^{r}
WC	(Czech Republic) M Přikryl	5
WC	(Slovakia) I Klec	6	7
Q	(Poland) M Gawron	4	6^{7}
Q	(Czech Republic) R Vik	2	7	4
5	(Austria) S Koubek	6	6^{5}	6
3	(Kazakhstan) Y Schukin	6	6
(Spain) G Alcaide	4	2
(Spain) G Olaso	7	4	6
(Ukraine) I Sergeyev	5	6	4
(Slovakia) P Červenák	3	3
Q	(Czech Republic) P Šnobel	6	6
PR	(Czech Republic) J Vaněk	1	0^{r}
6	(Czech Republic) L Rosol	6	1

Second round
(Serbia) F Krajinović	6	6
WC	(Czech Republic) M Přikryl	3	0
WC	(Slovakia) I Klec	7	1	6^{3}
5	(Austria) S Koubek	6^{5}	6	7
3	(Kazakhstan) Y Schukin	2	6	6
(Spain) G Olaso	6	2	2
Q	(Czech Republic) P Šnobel	2	4
6	(Czech Republic) L Rosol	6	6

Quarterfinals
(Serbia) F Krajinović	3	6	3
5	(Austria) S Koubek	6	3	6
3	(Kazakhstan) Y Schukin	6	5	7
6	(Czech Republic) L Rosol	2	7	5

Semifinals
5	(Austria) S Koubek	6	3	3
3	(Kazakhstan) Y Schukin	4	6	6

=== Bottom half ===
First round
7	(Spain) Ó Hernández	6	6
WC	(Slovakia) Marko Daniš	2	1
(France) J Eysseric	3	3
(Czech Republic) J Pospíšil	6	6
(Slovakia) M Mečíř Jr.	6	2	4
(Germany) A Flock	4	6	6
Q	(Russia) V Rudnev	6	2	7
4	(France) B Paire	1	6	6^{7}
8	(Czech Republic) D Lojda	6	5	6
(Slovakia) M Semjan	4	7	2
(Austria) A Peya	1	6	6
WC	(Czech Republic) L Dlouhý	6	1	4
(Slovakia) A Martin	6^{5}	3
(Italy) A Brizzi	7	6
(Czech Republic) J Hernych	7	6
2	(Slovakia) K Beck	6^{4}	2

Second round
7	(Spain) Ó Hernández	2	7	1
(Czech Republic) J Pospíšil	6	5	6
(Germany) A Flock	6	6
Q	(Russia) V Rudnev	2	1
8	(Czech Republic) D Lojda	7	6
(Austria) A Peya	6^{6}	4
(Italy) A Brizzi	6^{5}	6	1
(Czech Republic) J Hernych	7	3	6

Quarterfinals
(Czech Republic) J Pospíšil	6	6
(Germany) A Flock	3	2
8	(Czech Republic) D Lojda	6	6
(Czech Republic) J Hernych	3	0

Semifinals
(Czech Republic) J Pospíšil	7	6
8	(Czech Republic) D Lojda	5	2
