= 2012 Arimex Challenger Trophy – Doubles =

Doubles
- 2012 Arimex Challenger Trophy

Final
- Champions: (Serbia) Nikola Ćirić (Montenegro) Goran Tošić
- Runners-up: (Croatia) Mate Pavić (Croatia) Franko Škugor
- Score: 7–6^{(7–0)}, 7–5

Events
Singles	Doubles
← 2011 ·	Arimex Challenger Trophy	· 2013 →

Colin Ebelthite and Jaroslav Pospíšil were the defending champions, but lost in the semifinals this year.
Nikola Ćirić and Goran Tošić won the final 7–6^{(7–0)}, 7–5 against Mate Pavić and Franko Škugor.

== Seeds ==
1. (Australia) Colin Ebelthite / (Czech Republic) Jaroslav Pospíšil (semifinals)
2. (Austria) Martin Fischer / (Austria) Philipp Oswald (withdrew)
3. (France) Stéphane Robert / (Sweden) Andreas Siljeström (first round)
4. (Italy) Walter Trusendi / (Italy) Matteo Viola (first round)

== Draw ==
=== Key ===
- Q = Qualifier
- WC = Wild card
- LL = Lucky loser
- Alt = Alternate
- SE = Special exempt
- PR = Protected ranking
- ITF = ITF entry
- JE = Junior exempt
- w/o = Walkover
- r = Retired
- d = Defaulted
- SR = Special ranking

=== Draw ===
First round
1	(Australia) C Ebelthite (Czech Republic) J Pospíšil	6	6
(Croatia) N Mektić (Croatia) A Veić	2	3
WC	(Slovakia) F Horanský (Slovakia) Filip Vittek	6	6
WC	(Slovakia) Robert Gasparetz (Slovakia) Juraj Šimčák	4	3
4	(Italy) W Trusendi (Italy) M Viola	6	5	[5]
(Croatia) M Pavić (Croatia) F Škugor	3	6	[10]
(Bosnia and Herzegovina) D Džumhur (Croatia) D Marcan	1	7	[4]
(Canada) S Diez (Portugal) J Sousa	6	5	[10]
(Czech Republic) D Lojda (Netherlands) B Westerhof	4	6	[8]
(Spain) J Martí (Spain) I Navarro	6	2	[10]
(Serbia) N Ćirić (Montenegro) G Tošić	6	6
3	(France) S Robert (Sweden) A Siljeström	4	2
(Slovakia) A Martin (Slovakia) Adrian Sikora	4	0
(Slovakia) P Červenák (Germany) A Satschko	6	6
(Slovakia) K Čapkovič (Slovakia) Norbert Gomboš	w/o
2	(Austria) M Fischer (Austria) P Oswald

Quarterfinals
1	(Australia) C Ebelthite (Czech Republic) J Pospíšil	6	6
WC	(Slovakia) F Horanský (Slovakia) F Vittek	3	4
(Croatia) M Pavić (Croatia) F Škugor	6	4	[10]
(Canada) S Diez (Portugal) J Sousa	1	6	[8]
(Spain) J Martí (Spain) I Navarro	2	2
(Serbia) N Ćirić (Montenegro) G Tošić	6	6
(Slovakia) P Červenák (Germany) A Satschko	4	4
(Slovakia) K Čapkovič (Slovakia) N Gomboš	6	6

Semifinals
1	(Australia) C Ebelthite (Czech Republic) J Pospíšil	3	2
(Croatia) M Pavić (Croatia) F Škugor	6	6
(Serbia) N Ćirić (Montenegro) G Tošić	6	6
(Slovakia) K Čapkovič (Slovakia) N Gomboš	3	4

Final
(Croatia) M Pavić (Croatia) F Škugor	6^{0}	5
(Serbia) N Ćirić (Montenegro) G Tošić	7^{7}	7
