= 2014 Arimex Challenger Trophy – Singles =

Singles
- 2014 Arimex Challenger Trophy

Final
- Champion: (Austria) Andreas Haider-Maurer
- Runner-up: (Croatia) Antonio Veić
- Score: 2–6, 6–3, 7–6^{(7–4)}

Events
Singles	Doubles
← 2013 ·	Arimex Challenger Trophy	· 2015 →

Julian Reister was the current champions, but chose not to compete this year.

Andreas Haider-Maurer won the title by defeating Antonio Veić 2–6, 6–3, 7–6^{(7–4)} in the final.

== Seeds ==
1. (Netherlands) Robin Haase (second round)
2. (Slovenia) Blaž Rola (quarterfinals)
3. (Spain) Pere Riba (quarterfinals)
4. (Spain) Albert Montañés (second round)
5. (Austria) Andreas Haider-Maurer (champion)
6. (Romania) Adrian Ungur (second round)
7. (Hungary) Márton Fucsovics (semifinals)
8. (Romania) Victor Hănescu (second round)

== Draw ==
=== Key ===
- Q = Qualifier
- WC = Wild card
- LL = Lucky loser
- Alt = Alternate
- SE = Special exempt
- PR = Protected ranking
- ITF = ITF entry
- JE = Junior exempt
- w/o = Walkover
- r = Retired
- d = Defaulted
- SR = Special ranking

=== Finals ===
Semifinals
(Moldova) Radu Albot	3	6	2
5	(Austria) Andreas Haider-Maurer	6	3	6
7	(Hungary) Márton Fucsovics	2	3
(Croatia) Antonio Veić	6	6

Final
5	(Austria) Andreas Haider-Maurer	2	6	7^{7}
(Croatia) Antonio Veić	6	3	6^{4}

=== Top half ===
First round
1	(Netherlands) R Haase	6	6
(Slovakia) J Kovalik	4	1
(Moldova) R Albot	5	6	6
Q	(Romania) V Crivoi	7	3	2
PR	(Belgium) S Darcis	5	6	3
(Italy) M Cecchinato	7	3	6
Q	(Croatia) F Škugor	4	6^{4}
6	(Romania) A Ungur	6	7^{7}
4	(Spain) A Montañés	3	6	7^{7}
(Belgium) A De Greef	6	3	6^{1}
WC	(Czech Republic) J Hájek	6	6
(Romania) M Copil	4	4
Alt	(Czech Republic) J Mertl	6	6
WC	(Germany) J Choinski	1	0
SE	(Monaco) B Balleret	2	1
5	(Austria) A Haider-Maurer	6	6

Second round
1	(Netherlands) R Haase	6	3	0
(Moldova) R Albot	1	6	6
(Italy) M Cecchinato	7	1	6
6	(Romania) A Ungur	5	6	4
4	(Spain) A Montañés	1	5
WC	(Czech Republic) J Hájek	6	7
Alt	(Czech Republic) J Mertl	2	3
5	(Austria) A Haider-Maurer	6	6

Quarterfinals
(Moldova) R Albot	6	6^{1}	6
(Italy) M Cecchinato	2	7^{7}	4
WC	(Czech Republic) J Hájek	5	6^{5}
5	(Austria) A Haider-Maurer	7	7^{7}

Semifinals
(Moldova) R Albot	3	6	2
5	(Austria) A Haider-Maurer	6	3	6

=== Bottom half ===
First round
7	(Hungary) M Fucsovics	6	7
Q	(Ukraine) A Smirnov	3	5
(Italy) A Arnaboldi	4	2
(Australia) J Kubler	6	6
WC	(Slovakia) M Mečíř Jr.	7	6
WC	(Slovakia) K Beck	5	2
(Czech Republic) J Pospíšil	3	4
3	(Spain) P Riba	6	6
8	(Romania) V Hănescu	7	6
(Croatia) M Delić	5	2
(Croatia) A Veić	6	7
(Germany) P Torebko	4	5
(Italy) F Volandri	6	6
Q	(Austria) D Novak	3	0
(Belarus) U Ignatik	7^{7}	5	4
2	(Slovenia) B Rola	6^{5}	7	6

Second round
7	(Hungary) M Fucsovics	6	3	6
(Australia) J Kubler	4	6	4
WC	(Slovakia) M Mečíř Jr.	3	6	5
3	(Spain) P Riba	6	4	7
8	(Romania) V Hănescu	4	6^{4}
(Croatia) A Veić	6	7^{7}
(Italy) F Volandri	3	2
2	(Slovenia) B Rola	6	6

Quarterfinals
7	(Hungary) M Fucsovics	7	6
3	(Spain) P Riba	5	3
(Croatia) A Veić	7	6
2	(Slovenia) B Rola	5	3

Semifinals
7	(Hungary) M Fucsovics	2	3
(Croatia) A Veić	6	6
