= 2015 Arimex Challenger Trophy – Doubles =

Doubles
- 2015 Arimex Challenger Trophy

Final
- Champions: (Netherlands) Wesley Koolhof (Netherlands) Matwé Middelkoop
- Runners-up: (Poland) Kamil Majchrzak (France) Stéphane Robert
- Score: 6–4, 6–2

Events
Singles	Doubles
← 2014 ·	Arimex Challenger Trophy	· 2016 →

Roman Jebavý and Jaroslav Pospíšil were the defending champions in the 2015 Arimex Challenger Trophy—Doubles but chose not to compete together. Pospíšil chose to partner with Jan Šátral but lost in the first round to Kamil Majchrzak and Stéphane Robert. Jebavý chose not to compete.

== Seeds ==
1. (Netherlands) Wesley Koolhof / (Netherlands) Matwé Middelkoop (champions)
2. (Italy) Alessandro Motti / (Romania) Costin Pavăl (quarterfinals)
3. (Croatia) Ivan Sabanov / (Croatia) Matej Sabanov (first round)
4. (Czech Republic) Jaroslav Pospíšil / (Czech Republic) Jan Šátral (first round)

== Draw ==
=== Key ===
- Q = Qualifier
- WC = Wild card
- LL = Lucky loser
- Alt = Alternate
- SE = Special exempt
- PR = Protected ranking
- ITF = ITF entry
- JE = Junior exempt
- w/o = Walkover
- r = Retired
- d = Defaulted
- SR = Special ranking

First round
1	(Netherlands) W Koolhof (Netherlands) M Middelkoop	6	6
(Italy) R Bellotti (Austria) Pascal Brunner	2	4
(Belarus) U Ignatik (Czech Republic) D Lojda	6	5	[10]
(Italy) L Giustino (Czech Republic) Libor Salaba	2	7	[5]
3	(Croatia) I Sabanov (Croatia) M Sabanov	6	6^{4}	[4]
(Italy) F Gaio (Slovakia) A Martin	4	7^{7}	[10]
WC	(Hungary) M Fucsovics (Hungary) L Gödry	1	7^{7}	[9]
(Austria) L Miedler (Austria) T-S Weissborn	6	6^{4}	[11]
WC	(Russia) A Dubrivnyy (Turkey) E Kırkın	3	0
(Netherlands) Romano Frantzen (United Kingdom) D Walsh	6	6
(Poland) K Majchrzak (France) S Robert	6	6
4	(Czech Republic) J Pospíšil (Czech Republic) J Šátral	2	4
(Poland) T Bednarek (Croatia) F Škugor	7	6^{4}	[3]
(Spain) Í Cervantes (Netherlands) M Vervoort	5	7^{7}	[10]
WC	(Slovakia) Martin Blaško (Slovakia) A Molčan	4	2
2	(Italy) A Motti (Romania) C Pavăl	6	6

Quarterfinals
1	(Netherlands) W Koolhof (Netherlands) M Middelkoop	6	6
(Belarus) U Ignatik (Czech Republic) D Lojda	4	4
(Italy) F Gaio (Slovakia) A Martin	6^{6}	2
(Austria) L Miedler (Austria) T-S Weissborn	7^{8}	6
(Netherlands) R Frantzen (United Kingdom) D Walsh	4	6	[3]
(Poland) K Majchrzak (France) S Robert	6	3	[10]
(Spain) Í Cervantes (Netherlands) M Vervoort	3	6	[10]
2	(Italy) A Motti (Romania) C Pavăl	6	4	[2]

Semifinals
1	(Netherlands) W Koolhof (Netherlands) M Middelkoop	7^{7}	6
(Austria) L Miedler (Austria) T-S Weissborn	6^{2}	3
(Poland) K Majchrzak (France) S Robert	2	7^{7}	[10]
(Spain) Í Cervantes (Netherlands) M Vervoort	6	6^{4}	[6]

Final
1	(Netherlands) W Koolhof (Netherlands) M Middelkoop	6	6
(Poland) K Majchrzak (France) S Robert	4	2
