= 2014 Arimex Challenger Trophy – Doubles =

Doubles
- 2014 Arimex Challenger Trophy

Final
- Champions: (Czech Republic) Roman Jebavý (Czech Republic) Jaroslav Pospíšil
- Runners-up: (Netherlands) Stephan Fransen (Netherlands) Robin Haase
- Score: 6–4, 6–2

Events
Singles	Doubles
← 2013 ·	Arimex Challenger Trophy	· 2015 →

Marin Draganja and Mate Pavić were the defending champions, but did not compete this year.

Roman Jebavý and Jaroslav Pospíšil won the title by defeating Stephan Fransen and Robin Haase 6–4, 6–2 in the final.

== Seeds ==
1. (Czech Republic) František Čermák / (Czech Republic) Lukáš Dlouhý (first round)
2. (Netherlands) Stephan Fransen / (Netherlands) Robin Haase (final)
3. (Monaco) Benjamin Balleret / (Italy) Alessandro Motti (semifinals)
4. (Czech Republic) Roman Jebavý / (Czech Republic) Jaroslav Pospíšil (champions)

== Draw ==
=== Key ===
- Q = Qualifier
- WC = Wild card
- LL = Lucky loser
- Alt = Alternate
- SE = Special exempt
- PR = Protected ranking
- ITF = ITF entry
- JE = Junior exempt
- w/o = Walkover
- r = Retired
- d = Defaulted
- SR = Special ranking

=== Draw ===
First round
1	(Czech Republic) F Čermák (Czech Republic) L Dlouhý	3	7^{7}	[10]
(Slovakia) K Beck (Slovakia) I Zelenay	6	6^{2}	[12]
WC	(Slovakia) K Čapkovič (Czech Republic) Michal Schmid	6	4	[8]
(Poland) Piotr Gadomski (Czech Republic) M Michalička	4	6	[10]
4	(Czech Republic) R Jebavý (Czech Republic) J Pospíšil	1	6	[12]
(Romania) Alexandru-Daniel Carpen (Belarus) U Ignatik	6	3	[10]
(Romania) V Crivoi (Poland) G Panfil	1	2
(Poland) A Kapaś (Poland) B Koniusz	6	6
(Slovakia) J Kovalík (Czech Republic) J Mertl	6	7^{8}
(Moldova) R Albot (Romania) M Copil	2	6^{6}
(Croatia) F Škugor (Croatia) A Veić	5	1
3	(Monaco) B Balleret (Italy) A Motti	7	6
(Germany) A Mies (Germany) P Torebko	4	6	[11]
WC	(Hungary) M Fucsovics (Hungary) L Gödry	6	4	[9]
(Italy) A Arnaboldi (Italy) M Cecchinato	7^{7}	4	[10]
2	(Netherlands) S Fransen (Netherlands) R Haase	6^{5}	6	[12]

Quarterfinals
(Slovakia) K Beck (Slovakia) I Zelenay	6	6^{3}	[14]
(Poland) P Gadomski (Czech Republic) M Michalička	4	7^{7}	[12]
4	(Czech Republic) R Jebavý (Czech Republic) J Pospíšil	7	6
(Poland) A Kapaś (Poland) B Koniusz	5	1
(Slovakia) J Kovalík (Czech Republic) J Mertl	1	3
3	(Monaco) B Balleret (Italy) A Motti	6	6
(Germany) A Mies (Germany) P Torebko	3	3
2	(Netherlands) S Fransen (Netherlands) R Haase	6	6

Semifinals
(Slovakia) K Beck (Slovakia) I Zelenay	3	2
4	(Czech Republic) R Jebavý (Czech Republic) J Pospíšil	6	6
3	(Monaco) B Balleret (Italy) A Motti	5	3
2	(Netherlands) S Fransen (Netherlands) R Haase	7	6

Final
4	(Czech Republic) R Jebavý (Czech Republic) J Pospíšil	6	6
2	(Netherlands) S Fransen (Netherlands) R Haase	4	2
