= 2011 ATP Challenger Trophy =

- Date: 19–25 September
- Edition: 5th
- Location: Trnava, Slovakia

Champions

Singles
- (Spain) Iñigo Cervantes-Huegun

Doubles
- (Australia) Colin Ebelthite / (Czech Republic) Jaroslav Pospíšil
← 2010 ·	ATP Challenger Trophy	· 2012 →

The 2011 ATP Challenger Trophy was a professional tennis tournament played on clay courts. It was the fifth edition of the tournament which was part of the 2011 ATP Challenger Tour. It took place in Trnava, Slovakia between 19 and 25 September 2011.

== ATP entrants ==
=== Seeds ===
Country	Player	Rank^{1}	Seed
SVK	Martin Kližan	86	1
GER	Dustin Brown	123	2
GER	Björn Phau	130	3
FRA	Augustin Gensse	140	4
CZE	Jaroslav Pospíšil	142	5
CZE	Jan Hájek	150	6
FRA	Maxime Teixeira	158	7
KAZ	Yuri Schukin	173	8

- ^{1} Rankings are as of September 12, 2011.

=== Other entrants ===
The following players received wildcards into the singles main draw:

- (Slovakia) Norbert Gomboš
- (Slovakia) Jozef Kovalík
- (Czech Republic) Martin Přikryl
- (Austria) Tristan-Samuel Weiβborn

The following players received entry from the qualifying draw:

- (Slovakia) Kamil Čapkovič
- (Spain) Iñigo Cervantes-Huegun
- (Russia) Andrey Kuznetsov
- (Switzerland) Michael Lammer

The following players received entry as a lucky loser into the singles main draw:

- (Germany) Alexander Flock
- (Czech Republic) Roman Jebavý

== Champions ==
=== Singles ===
(Spain) Iñigo Cervantes-Huegun def. (Slovakia) Pavol Červenák, 6–4, 7–6^{(7–3)}

=== Doubles ===
(Australia) Colin Ebelthite / (Czech Republic) Jaroslav Pospíšil def. (Belarus) Aliaksandr Bury / (Belarus) Andrei Vasilevski, 6–3, 6–4
