= 2015 Arimex Challenger Trophy – Singles =

Singles
- 2015 Arimex Challenger Trophy

Final
- Champion: (Netherlands) Robin Haase
- Runner-up: (Argentina) Horacio Zeballos
- Score: 6–4, 6–1

Events
Singles	Doubles
- Arimex Challenger Trophy

Andreas Haider-Maurer was the defending champion but chose to compete at the St. Petersburg Open instead

== Seeds ==
1. (Netherlands) Robin Haase (champion)
2. (Italy) Marco Cecchinato (withdrew)
3. (Spain) Íñigo Cervantes (second round)
4. (Spain) Albert Montañés (semifinals)
5. (Japan) Taro Daniel (second round)
6. (Argentina) Horacio Zeballos (final)
7. (Netherlands) Thiemo de Bakker (first round)
8. (Czech Republic) Adam Pavlásek (quarterfinals)

== Draw ==
Key

- Q = Qualifier
- WC = Wild card
- LL = Lucky loser
- Alt = Alternate
- ITF = ITF entry
- PR = Protected ranking
- SR = Special ranking
- SE = Special exempt
- JE = Junior exempt
- JR = Junior Accelerator Programme entrant
- CO = College Accelerator Programme entrant
- NG = Next Gen Accelerator Program entrant
- w/o = Walkover
- r = Retired
- d = Defaulted

=== Finals ===
Semifinals
1	(Netherlands) Robin Haase	6	6
4	(Spain) Albert Montañés	2	2
(Croatia) Franko Škugor	2	2
6	(Argentina) Horacio Zeballos	6	6

Final
1	(Netherlands) Robin Haase	6	6
6	(Argentina) Horacio Zeballos	4	1

=== Top half ===
First round
1	(Netherlands) R Haase	2	6	7^{7}
Q	(Italy) R Bellotti	6	2	6^{5}
WC	(Slovakia) Dominik Šproch	0	2
(Austria) M Linzer	6	6
SE	(Ukraine) A Smirnov	6	6
Q	(Austria) Lenny Hampel	1	2
(Austria) G Melzer	3	7^{7}	6
7	(Netherlands) T de Bakker	6	6^{4}	3
4	(Spain) A Montañés	6	6
WC	(Slovakia) Martin Blasko	3	4
WC	(Slovakia) A Molčan	7^{8}	7^{7}
(Czech Republic) J Šátral	5^{6}	6^{2}
Q	(Slovakia) M Mečíř Jr.	4	0
(Poland) K Majchrzak	6	6
WC	(Russia) A Dubrivnyy	2	2
8	(Czech Republic) A Pavlásek	6	6

Second round
1	(Netherlands) R Haase	6	6
(Austria) M Linzer	3	2
SE	(Ukraine) A Smirnov	1	2
(Austria) G Melzer	6	6
4	(Spain) A Montañés	7^{7}	6
WC	(Slovakia) A Molčan	6^{5}	4
(Poland) K Majchrzak	4	6^{3}
8	(Czech Republic) A Pavlásek	6	7^{7}

Quarterfinals
1	(Netherlands) R Haase	4	6	6
(Austria) G Melzer	6	3	3
4	(Spain) A Montañés	6	6
8	(Czech Republic) A Pavlásek	2	4

Semifinals
1	(Netherlands) R Haase	6	6
4	(Spain) A Montañés	2	2

=== Bottom half ===
First round
5	(Japan) T Daniel	6	6
Q	(Austria) T-S Weissborn	3	4
(Czech Republic) M Michalička	4	4
(Hungary) M Fucsovics	6	6
(Croatia) F Škugor	6^{5}	6	6
(Italy) L Giustino	7^{7}	3	3
(Belarus) U Ignatik	4	6^{3}
3	(Spain) Í Cervantes	6	7^{7}
6	(Argentina) H Zeballos	4
(Portugal) R Machado	0^{r}
(Czech Republic) J Pospíšil	1	3
(Czech Republic) D Lojda	6	6
(Slovakia) A Martin	5	2
(France) S Robert	7	6
(Italy) F Gaio	6	0	7
LL	(Czech Republic) V Šafránek	4	6	5

Second round
5	(Japan) T Daniel	1	5
(Hungary) M Fucsovics	6	7
(Croatia) F Škugor	7^{7}	7
3	(Spain) Í Cervantes	6^{5}	5
6	(Argentina) H Zeballos	6	6
(Czech Republic) D Lojda	3	3
(France) S Robert	6	6
(Italy) F Gaio	4	3

Quarterfinals
(Hungary) M Fucsovics	7^{7}	0	3
(Croatia) F Škugor	6^{4}	6	6
6	(Argentina) H Zeballos	6	6
(France) S Robert	1	2

Semifinals
(Croatia) F Škugor	2	2
6	(Argentina) H Zeballos	6	6
