= 2016 STRABAG Challenger Open – Singles =

Singles
- 2016 STRABAG Challenger Open

Final
- Champion: (Belgium) Steve Darcis
- Runner-up: (Spain) Jordi Samper Montaña
- Score: 6–3, 6–4

Events
Singles	Doubles
- STRABAG Challenger Open

Robin Haase was the defending champion but chose not to defend his title.

Steve Darcis won the title after defeating Jordi Samper Montaña 6–3, 6–4 in the final.

== Seeds ==
1. (Spain) Íñigo Cervantes (first round)
2. (Czech Republic) Adam Pavlásek (first round)
3. (Netherlands) Igor Sijsling (quarterfinals)
4. (Spain) Daniel Gimeno Traver (second round)
5. (Belgium) Steve Darcis (champion)
6. (Belgium) Kimmer Coppejans (quarterfinals)
7. (France) Constant Lestienne (second round)
8. (Canada) Steven Diez (semifinals)

== Draw ==
Key

- Q = Qualifier
- WC = Wild card
- LL = Lucky loser
- Alt = Alternate
- ITF = ITF entry
- PR = Protected ranking
- SR = Special ranking
- SE = Special exempt
- JE = Junior exempt
- JR = Junior Accelerator Programme entrant
- CO = College Accelerator Programme entrant
- NG = Next Gen Accelerator Program entrant
- w/o = Walkover
- r = Retired
- d = Defaulted

=== Finals ===
Semifinals
(Spain) Jordi Samper Montaña	7	6^{5}	6
(Japan) Akira Santillan	5	7^{7}	4
5	(Belgium) Steve Darcis	6	6
8	(Canada) Steven Diez	4	4

Final
(Spain) Jordi Samper Montaña	3	4
5	(Belgium) Steve Darcis	6	6

=== Top half ===
First round
1	(Spain) Í Cervantes	4	5
(Brazil) A Ghem	6	7
(Belgium) Y Reuter	3	6	3
(Spain) J Samper-Montaña	6	4	6
(Czech Republic) J Šátral	1	6	6
Q	(Sweden) M Eriksson	6	3	3
Alt	(Italy) R Bellotti	0	2
6	(Belgium) K Coppejans	6	6
4	(Spain) D Gimeno Traver	6	6
(Bulgaria) D Kuzmanov	4	4
WC	(Austria) J Melzer	6	1	2
Q	(Poland) H Hurkacz	4	6	6
(Japan) A Santillan	4	7^{8}	7^{7}
(Belgium) J De Loore	6	6^{6}	6^{5}
(Russia) A Vatutin	6	4	2
7	(France) C Lestienne	2	6	6

Second round
(Brazil) A Ghem	4	3
(Spain) J Samper-Montaña	6	6
(Czech Republic) J Šátral	1	1
6	(Belgium) K Coppejans	6	6
4	(Spain) D Gimeno Traver	6	4	6^{5}
Q	(Poland) H Hurkacz	3	6	7^{7}
(Japan) A Santillan	6	6
7	(France) C Lestienne	2	0

Quarterfinals
(Spain) J Samper-Montaña	6	7^{8}
6	(Belgium) K Coppejans	0	6^{6}
Q	(Poland) H Hurkacz	5	5
(Japan) A Santillan	7	7

Semifinals
(Spain) J Samper-Montaña	7	6^{5}	6
(Japan) A Santillan	5	7^{7}	4

=== Bottom half ===
First round
5	(Belgium) S Darcis	6	6
PR	(Brazil) F de Paula	1	4
(Czech Republic) Robin Staněk	6	6
WC	(Slovakia) Martin Blaško	3	2
WC	(Slovakia) Patrik Fabian	4	3
Q	(France) G Blancaneaux	6	6
(Serbia) L Đere	6	2	5
3	(Netherlands) I Sijsling	4	6	7
8	(Canada) S Diez	6	7
(Belgium) Clément Geens	3	5
(Slovakia) N Gombos	6	6
(France) G Sakharov	2	2
Q	(Czech Republic) R Jebavý	6	6
WC	(Slovakia) Dominik Šproch	3	1
(Czech Republic) M Michalička	2	6	6
2	(Czech Republic) A Pavlásek	6	3	2

Second round
5	(Belgium) S Darcis	6	6
(Czech Republic) R Staněk	4	1
Q	(France) G Blancaneaux	3	4
3	(Netherlands) I Sijsling	6	6
8	(Canada) S Diez	7^{7}	3	7^{7}
(Slovakia) N Gombos	6^{4}	6	6^{5}
Q	(Czech Republic) R Jebavý	7	2	2
(Czech Republic) M Michalička	5	6	6

Quarterfinals
5	(Belgium) S Darcis	6	6
3	(Netherlands) I Sijsling	1	4
8	(Canada) S Diez	6	6
(Czech Republic) M Michalička	3	4

Semifinals
5	(Belgium) S Darcis	6	6
8	(Canada) S Diez	4	4
