= 2009 ATP Challenger Trophy =

- Date: 21–27 September
- Edition: 3rd
- Location: Trnava, Slovakia

Champions

Singles
- (Ukraine) Oleksandr Dolgopolov Jr.

Doubles
- (Bulgaria) Grigor Dimitrov / (Russia) Teymuraz Gabashvili
← 2008 ·	ATP Challenger Trophy	· 2010 →

The 2009 ATP Challenger Trophy was a professional tennis tournament played on outdoor red clay courts. It was the third edition of the tournament which was part of the 2009 ATP Challenger Tour. It took place in Trnava, Slovakia between 21 and 27 September 2009.

== Singles main draw entrants ==
=== Seeds ===
Country	Player	Rank^{1}	Seed
RUS	Teymuraz Gabashvili	79	1
ALG	Lamine Ouahab	118	2
CZE	Jan Hájek	121	3
UKR	Sergiy Stakhovsky	147	4
SVK	Dominik Hrbatý	154	5
GER	Julian Reister	160	6
UKR	Oleksandr Dolgopolov Jr.	164	7
CZE	Jiří Vaněk	172	8

- Rankings are as of 14 September 2009.

=== Other entrants ===
The following players received wildcards into the singles main draw:

- (Czech Republic) Jaroslav Pospíšil
- (Slovakia) Marek Semjan
- (Czech Republic) Bohdan Ulihrach
- (Austria) Lukas Weinhandl

The following players received entry from the qualifying draw:

- (Hungary) György Balázs
- (Romania) Cătălin Gârd
- (Slovakia) Andrej Martin
- (Poland) Grzegorz Panfil

== Champions ==
=== Singles ===
(Ukraine) Oleksandr Dolgopolov Jr. def. (Algeria) Lamine Ouahab, 6–2, 6–2

=== Doubles ===
(Bulgaria) Grigor Dimitrov / (Russia) Teymuraz Gabashvili def. (Czech Republic) Jan Minář / (Czech Republic) Lukáš Rosol, 6–4, 2–6, [10–8]
