= 2010 Due Ponti Cup =

Tennis tournament

- Date: May 31 – June 6
- Edition: 1st
- Location: Rome, Italy

Champions

Singles
- (Italy) Filippo Volandri

Doubles
- (Mexico) Santiago González / (United States) Travis Rettenmaier
Due Ponti Cup	· 2011 →

The 2010 Due Ponti Cup was a professional tennis tournament played on outdoor red clay courts. It was part of the 2010 ATP Challenger Tour. It took place in Rome, Italy between 31 May and 6 June 2010.

== ATP entrants ==
=== Seeds ===
Nationality	Player	Ranking*	Seeding
BRA	Ricardo Mello	90	1
ITA	Paolo Lorenzi	95	2
ITA	Filippo Volandri	118	3
BRA	João Souza	125	4
ITA	Simone Bolelli	126	5
ARG	Máximo González	148	6
ROU	Victor Crivoi	158	7
ROU	Adrian Ungur	166	8

- Rankings are as of May 24, 2010.

=== Other entrants ===
The following players received wildcards into the singles main draw:

- (Italy) Francesco Aldi
- (Italy) Marco Crugnola
- (Italy) Thomas Fabbiano
- (Mexico) Santiago González

The following players received entry into the singles main draw as an alternate:

- (Argentina) Martín Alund

The following players received entry from the qualifying draw:

- (Argentina) Facundo Bagnis
- (Italy) Alberto Brizzi
- (Italy) Daniele Giorgini
- (Argentina) Guido Pella

The following player received the lucky loser spot:

- (Egypt) Karim Maamoun

== Champions ==
=== Singles ===
(Italy) Filippo Volandri def. (Morocco) Reda El Amrani, 6–3, 6–2

=== Doubles ===
(Mexico) Santiago González / (United States) Travis Rettenmaier def. (Australia) Sadik Kadir / (India) Purav Raja, 6–2, 6–4
