= 2010 ATP Challenger Trophy =

- Date: 20 – 26 September
- Edition: 4th
- Location: Trnava, Slovakia

Champions

Singles
- (Czech Republic) Jaroslav Pospíšil

Doubles
- (Slovakia) Karol Beck / (Czech Republic) Lukáš Rosol
| ← 2009 · | ATP Challenger Trophy | · 2011 → |

The 2010 ATP Challenger Trophy was a professional tennis tournament played on outdoor red clay courts. It was the fourth edition of the tournament which is part of the 2010 ATP Challenger Tour. It took place in Trnava, Slovakia between 20 and 26 September 2010.

== ATP entrants ==
=== Seeds ===
| Nationality | Player | Ranking* | Seeding |
|---|---|---|---|
| CZE | Jan Hájek | 96 | 1 |
| SVK | Karol Beck | 121 | 2 |
| KAZ | Yuri Schukin | 132 | 3 |
| FRA | Benoît Paire | 142 | 4 |
| AUT | Stefan Koubek | 143 | 5 |
| CZE | Lukáš Rosol | 157 | 6 |
| ESP | Óscar Hernández | 167 | 7 |
| CZE | Dušan Lojda | 172 | 8 |

- Rankings are as of September 13, 2010.

=== Other entrants ===
The following players received wildcards into the singles main draw:

- (Slovakia) Marko Daniš
- (Czech Republic) Lukáš Dlouhý
- (Slovakia) Ivo Klec
- (Czech Republic) Martin Přikryl

The following players received entry from the qualifying draw:

- (Poland) Marcin Gawron
- (Russia) Valery Rudnev
- (Czech Republic) Pavel Šnobel
- (Czech Republic) Robin Vik

== Champions ==
=== Singles ===
(Czech Republic) Jaroslav Pospíšil def. (Kazakhstan) Yuri Schukin, 6–4, 4–6, 6–3

=== Doubles ===
(Slovakia) Karol Beck / (Czech Republic) Lukáš Rosol def. (Austria) Alexander Peya / (Austria) Martin Slanar, 4–6, 7–6(3), [10–8]
