= 2016 STRABAG Challenger Open =

- Date: 8–14 August
- Edition: 10th
- Surface: Clay
- Location: Trnava, Slovakia

Champions

Singles
- (Belgium) Steve Darcis

Doubles
- (Belgium) Sander Gillé / (Belgium) Joran Vliegen
← 2015 ·	STRABAG Challenger Open	· 2017 →

The 2016 STRABAG Challenger Open was a professional tennis tournament played on clay courts. It was the tenth edition of the tournament which was part of the 2016 ATP Challenger Tour. It took place at the TC EMPIRE in Trnava, Slovakia from 8 to 14 August 2016.

== Singles main-draw entrants ==
=== Seeds ===
Country	Player	Rank	Seed
ESP	Íñigo Cervantes	79	1
CZE	Adam Pavlásek	104	2
NED	Igor Sijsling	114	3
ESP	Daniel Gimeno Traver	124	4
BEL	Steve Darcis	134	5
BEL	Kimmer Coppejans	159	6
FRA	Constant Lestienne	165	7
CAN	Steven Diez	173	8

- ^{1} Rankings are as of August 1, 2016.

=== Other entrants ===
The following players received wildcards into the singles main draw:

- (Austria) Jürgen Melzer
- (Slovakia) Martin Blaško
- (Slovakia) Patrik Fabian
- (Slovakia) Dominik Šproch

The following player received entry into the singles main draw with a protected ranking:

- (Brazil) Fabiano de Paula

The following player received entry as an alternate:

- (Italy) Riccardo Bellotti

The following players received entry from the qualifying draw:

- (France) Geoffrey Blancaneaux
- (Sweden) Markus Eriksson
- (Poland) Hubert Hurkacz
- (Czech Republic) Roman Jebavý

== Champions ==
=== Singles ===
- (Belgium) Steve Darcis def. (Spain) Jordi Samper-Montaña, 6–3, 6–4

=== Doubles ===
- (Belgium) Sander Gillé / (Belgium) Joran Vliegen def. (Poland) Tomasz Bednarek / (Czech Republic) Roman Jebavý, 6–2, 7–5
