= 2016 STRABAG Challenger Open – Doubles =

Doubles
- 2016 STRABAG Challenger Open

Final
- Champion: (Belgium) Sander Gillé (Belgium) Joran Vliegen
- Runner-up: (Poland) Tomasz Bednarek (Czech Republic) Roman Jebavý
- Score: 6–2, 7–5

Events
Singles	Doubles
← 2015 ·	STRABAG Challenger Open	· 2017 →

Wesley Koolhof and Matwé Middelkoop were the defending champions but lost in the quarterfinals to Sander Arends and Adam Majchrowicz.

Sander Gillé and Joran Vliegen won the title after defeating Tomasz Bednarek and Roman Jebavý 6–2, 7–5 in the final.

== Seeds ==
1. (Netherlands) Wesley Koolhof / (Netherlands) Matwé Middelkoop (quarterfinals)
2. (Austria) Julian Knowle / (Austria) Tristan-Samuel Weissborn (semifinals)
3. (Uruguay) Ariel Behar / (Croatia) Dino Marcan (first round)
4. (Russia) Mikhail Elgin / (Belarus) Andrei Vasilevski (quarterfinals)

== Draw ==
=== Key ===
- Q = Qualifier
- WC = Wild card
- LL = Lucky loser
- Alt = Alternate
- SE = Special exempt
- PR = Protected ranking
- ITF = ITF entry
- JE = Junior exempt
- w/o = Walkover
- r = Retired
- d = Defaulted
- SR = Special ranking

First round
1	(Netherlands) W Koolhof (Netherlands) M Middelkoop	6	6
(Croatia) I Sabanov (Croatia) M Sabanov	2	4
(Netherlands) S Arends (Poland) A Majchrowicz	6^{5}	7^{7}	[10]
(Spain) Í Cervantes (Spain) P Martínez	7^{7}	6^{4}	[4]
3	(Uruguay) A Behar (Croatia) D Marcan	5	6^{5}
(Austria) M Neuchrist (Netherlands) D Pel	7	7^{7}
WC	(Turkey) S Ağabigün (Czech Republic) Libor Salaba	2	5
(Belgium) S Gillé (Belgium) J Vliegen	6	7
(Brazil) A Ghem (Poland) M Kowalczyk	2	7	[2]
(Poland) T Bednarek (Czech Republic) R Jebavý	6	5	[10]
(France) C Lestienne (Sweden) M Sekulic	3	6	[3]
4	(Russia) M Elgin (Belarus) A Vasilevski	6	4	[10]
WC	(Slovakia) Martin Blaško (Slovakia) Patrik Fabian	6	7^{7}
Alt	(Brazil) F de Paula (Russia) A Vatutin	3	6^{5}
WC	(Slovakia) K Beck (Russia) A Dubrivnyy	5	4
2	(Austria) J Knowle (Austria) T-S Weissborn	7	6

Quarterfinals
1	(Netherlands) W Koolhof (Netherlands) M Middelkoop	5	6	[11]
(Netherlands) S Arends (Poland) A Majchrowicz	7	2	[13]
(Austria) M Neuchrist (Netherlands) D Pel	4	6^{7}
(Belgium) S Gillé (Belgium) J Vliegen	6	7^{9}
(Poland) T Bednarek (Czech Republic) R Jebavý	7	3	[10]
4	(Russia) M Elgin (Belarus) A Vasilevski	5	6	[7]
WC	(Slovakia) M Blaško (Slovakia) P Fabian	4	3
2	(Austria) J Knowle (Austria) T-S Weissborn	6	6

Semifinals
(Netherlands) S Arends (Poland) A Majchrowicz	3	6	[10]
(Belgium) S Gillé (Belgium) J Vliegen	6	4	[12]
(Poland) T Bednarek (Czech Republic) R Jebavý	6	6
2	(Austria) J Knowle (Austria) T-S Weissborn	4	4

Final
(Belgium) S Gillé (Belgium) J Vliegen	6	7
(Poland) T Bednarek (Czech Republic) R Jebavý	2	5
