= 2015 Arimex Challenger Trophy =

- Date: 21–27 September
- Edition: 9th
- Surface: Clay
- Location: Trnava, Slovakia

Champions

Singles
- (Netherlands) Robin Haase

Doubles
- (Netherlands) Wesley Koolhof / (Netherlands) Matwé Middelkoop
← 2014 ·	Arimex Challenger Trophy	· 2016 →

The 2015 Arimex ATP Challenger Trophy was a professional tennis tournament played on clay courts. It was the ninth edition of the tournament which was part of the 2015 ATP Challenger Tour. It took place at the TC EMPIRE in Trnava, Slovakia from 21 to 27 September 2015.

== Singles main-draw entrants ==
=== Seeds ===
Country	Player	Rank	Seed
NED	Robin Haase	71	1
ITA	~~Marco Cecchinato~~	~~95~~	2
ESP	Íñigo Cervantes	110	3
ESP	Albert Montañés	120	4
JPN	Taro Daniel	124	5
ARG	Horacio Zeballos	140	6
NED	Thiemo de Bakker	144	7
CZE	Adam Pavlásek	146	8

- ^{1} Rankings are as of September 14, 2015.

=== Other entrants ===
The following players received wildcards into the singles main draw:

- (Slovakia) Martin Blaško
- (Russia) Artem Dubrivnyy
- (Slovakia) Alex Molčan
- (Slovakia) Dominik Šproch

The following player received a special exemption into the singles main draw:

- (Ukraine) Artem Smirnov

The following players received entry from the qualifying draw:

- (Italy) Riccardo Bellotti
- (Austria) Lenny Hampel
- (Slovakia) Miloslav Mečíř Jr.
- (Austria) Tristan-Samuel Weissborn

The following player received entry as a lucky loser:

- (Czech Republic) Václav Šafránek

== Champions ==
=== Singles ===
- (Netherlands) Robin Haase def. (Argentina) Horacio Zeballos, 6–4, 6–1

=== Doubles ===
- (Netherlands) Wesley Koolhof / (Netherlands) Matwé Middelkoop def. (Poland) Kamil Majchrzak / (France) Stéphane Robert, 6–4, 6–2
