= 2012 Arimex Challenger Trophy =

- Date: 17–23 September
- Edition: 6th
- Surface: Clay
- Location: Trnava, Slovakia

Champions

Singles
- (Russia) Andrey Kuznetsov

Doubles
- (Serbia) Nikola Ćirić / (Montenegro) Goran Tošić
← 2011 ·	Arimex Challenger Trophy	· 2013 →

The 2012 Arimex ATP Challenger Trophy was a professional tennis tournament played on clay courts. It was the sixth edition of the tournament which was part of the 2012 ATP Challenger Tour. It took place in Trnava, Slovakia between 17 and 23 September 2012.

== Singles main draw entrants ==
=== Seeds ===
Country	Player	Rank^{1}	Seed
CZE	Lukáš Rosol	88	1
ROU	Adrian Ungur	102	2
POR	João Sousa	107	3
AUT	Andreas Haider-Maurer	118	4
RUS	Andrey Kuznetsov	126	5
CRO	Antonio Veić	137	6
CHI	Paul Capdeville	161	7
ITA	Matteo Viola	162	8

- ^{1} Rankings are as of September 10, 2012.

=== Other entrants ===
The following players received wildcards into the singles main draw:

- (Slovakia) Norbert Gomboš
- (Germany) Robin Kern
- (Austria) Nicolas Reissig
- (Slovakia) Adrian Sikora

The following players received entry as a special exempt into the singles main draw:

- (Australia) Jason Kubler
- (Croatia) Nikola Mektić

The following players received entry from the qualifying draw:

- (Canada) Steven Diez
- (Czech Republic) Dušan Lojda
- (France) Stéphane Robert
- (Italy) Walter Trusendi

== Champions ==
=== Singles ===
- (Russia) Andrey Kuznetsov def. (Romania) Adrian Ungur, 6–3, 6–3

=== Doubles ===
- (Serbia) Nikola Ćirić / (Montenegro) Goran Tošić def. (Croatia) Mate Pavić / (Croatia) Franko Škugor, 7–6^{(7–0)}, 7–5
