= 2014 Arimex Challenger Trophy =

- Date: 15–21 September
- Edition: 8th
- Surface: Clay
- Location: Trnava, Slovakia

Champions

Singles
- (Austria) Andreas Haider-Maurer

Doubles
- (Czech Republic) Roman Jebavý / (Czech Republic) Jaroslav Pospíšil
← 2013 ·	Arimex Challenger Trophy	· 2015 →

The 2014 Arimex ATP Challenger Trophy was a professional tennis tournament played on clay courts. It was the eighth edition of the tournament which was part of the 2014 ATP Challenger Tour. It took place at the TC EMPIRE in Trnava, Slovakia from 15 to 21 September 2014.

== Singles main-draw entrants ==
=== Seeds ===
Country	Player	Rank	Seed
NED	Robin Haase	70	1
SLO	Blaž Rola	93	2
ESP	Pere Riba	110	3
ESP	Albert Montañés	111	4
AUT	Andreas Haider-Maurer	118	5
ROM	Adrian Ungur	134	6
HUN	Márton Fucsovics	140	7
ROM	Victor Hănescu	143	8

=== Other entrants ===
The following players received wildcards into the singles main draw:

- (Slovakia) Karol Beck
- (Germany) Jan Choinski
- (Czech Republic) Jan Hájek
- (Slovakia) Miloslav Mečíř Jr.

The following player received a special exemption into the singles main draw:

- (Monaco) Benjamin Balleret

The following player received a protected ranking into the singles main draw:

- (Belgium) Steve Darcis

The following player entered into the singles main draw as an alternate:

- (Czech Republic) Jan Mertl

The following players received entry from the qualifying draw:

- (Romania) Victor Crivoi
- (Austria) Dennis Novak
- (Croatia) Franko Škugor
- (Ukraine) Artem Smirnov

== Champions ==
=== Singles ===
- (Austria) Andreas Haider-Maurer def. (Croatia) Antonio Veić, 2–6, 6–3, 7–6^{(7–4)}

=== Doubles ===
- (Czech Republic) Roman Jebavý / (Czech Republic) Jaroslav Pospíšil def. (Netherlands) Stephan Fransen / (Netherlands) Robin Haase, 6–4, 6–2
