= Due Ponti Cup =

ATP Challenger Tour
- Event name: Rome
- Location: Rome, Italy
- Category: ATP Challenger Tour
- Surface: Clay
- Draw: 32S/32Q/16D
- Prize money: €30,000

The Due Ponti Cup is a professional tennis tournament played on outdoor clay courts. It is currently part of the Association of Tennis Professionals (ATP) Challenger Tour. It is held annually in Rome, Italy, since 2010.

== Past finals ==
=== Singles ===
Year	Champion	Runner-up	Score
2010	(Italy) Filippo Volandri	(Morocco) Reda El Amrani	6–3, 6–2

=== Doubles ===
Year	Champions	Runners-up	Score
2010	(Mexico) Santiago González (United States) Travis Rettenmaier	(Australia) Sadik Kadir (India) Purav Raja	6–2, 6–4
