= Kristijan Mesaroš =

Croatian tennis player

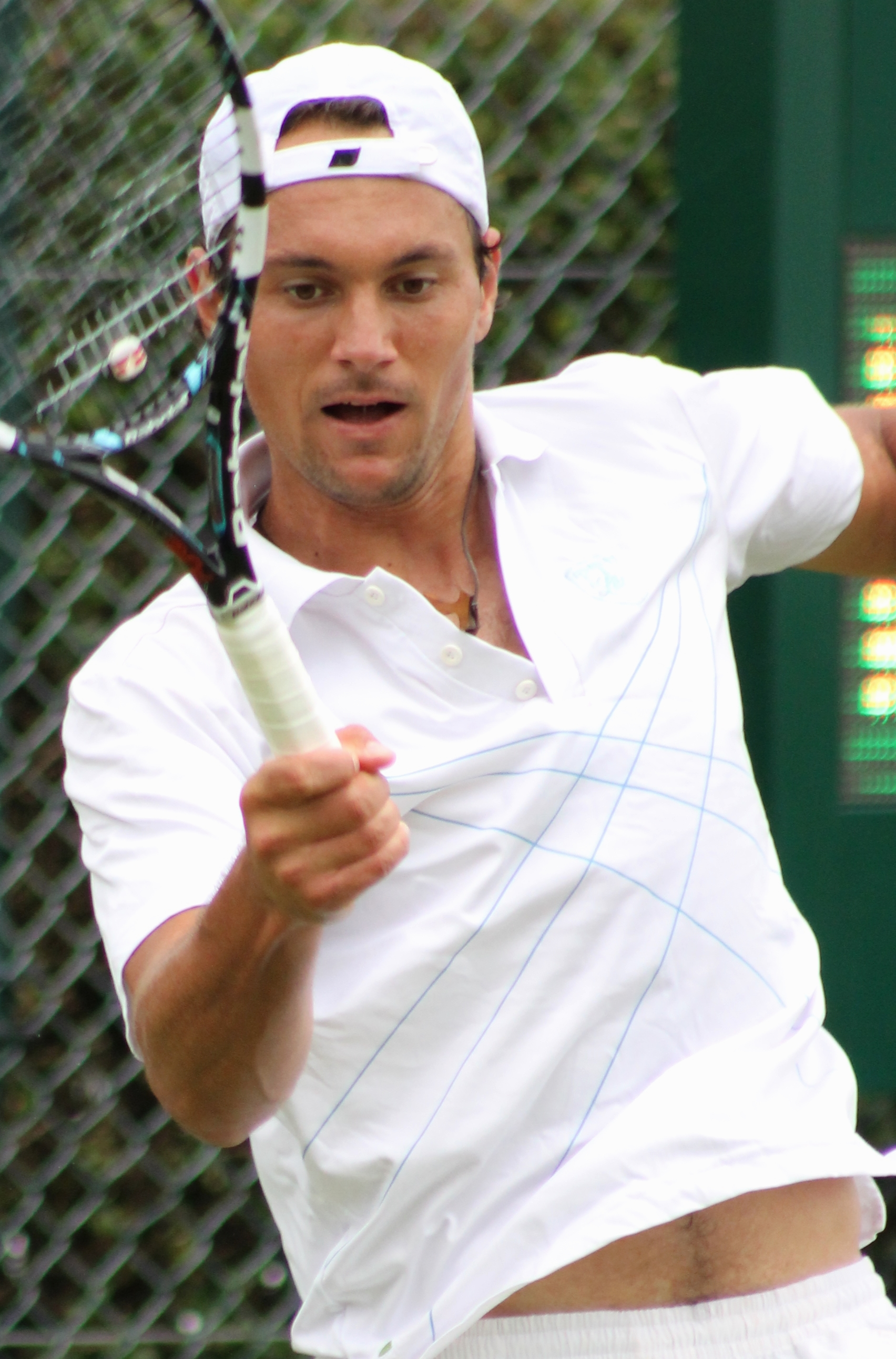
- Country (sports): Croatia
- Residence: Poreč, Croatia
- Born: 2 July 1988 (age 37) Slavonski Brod, SR Croatia, SFR Yugoslavia
- Plays: Right-handed (two-handed backhand)
- Prize money: $ 160,507

Singles
- Career record: 0–1
- Career titles: 0
- Highest ranking: No. 184 (14 April 2014)

Grand Slam singles results
- Australian Open: Q1 (2014, 2017)
- French Open: Q2 (2014)
- Wimbledon: Q1 (2014)

Doubles
- Career record: 0–0
- Career titles: 0
- Highest ranking: No. 553 (18 April 2011)

Kristijan Mesaroš (Croatian pronunciation: [krǐstijan měsaːroʃ]; Hungarian: Mészáros Krisztián; born 2 July 1988) is a Croatian tennis player playing on the ITF Futures Tour and the ATP Challenger Tour. Mesaroš has a career-high ATP ranking of No. 184 achieved on 14 April 2014 and a doubles ranking of No. 553 achieved on 18 April 2011.
