= Riccardo Bellotti =

Italian tennis player

- Country (sports): Italy
- Born: 5 August 1991 (age 34) Vienna, Austria
- Retired: 2019 (last match played)
- Plays: Right-handed (two-handed backhand)
- Prize money: $177,849

Singles
- Career record: 0–1 (at ATP Tour level, Grand Slam level, and in Davis Cup)
- Career titles: 0
- Highest ranking: No. 199 (8 May 2017)

Grand Slam singles results
- Australian Open: Q1 (2017)
- French Open: Q1 (2017)
- Wimbledon: Q2 (2017)
- US Open: Q2 (2017)

Doubles
- Career record: 0–0 (at ATP Tour level, Grand Slam level, and in Davis Cup)
- Career titles: 0
- Highest ranking: No. 229 (10 June 2019)
- Last updated on: 1 March 2021.

Riccardo Bellotti (Italian pronunciation: [rikˈkardo belˈlɔtti]; born 5 August 1991) is a former Italian tennis player.

Bellotti has a career-high ATP singles ranking of 199 achieved on 8 May 2017. He also has a career-high ATP doubles ranking of 514 achieved on 10 December 2012.

Belotti won a record-tying nine ITF titles in 2016.

Bellotti made his ATP main draw debut at the 2017 Istanbul Open after defeating Andrés Molteni and Laurynas Grigelis in qualifying. He was defeated by Rogério Dutra Silva in the first round.

== Challenger and Futures Finals ==
=== Singles: 39 (30–9) ===
Legend (singles) ATP Challenger Tour (0–0) ITF Futures Tour (30–9)	Titles by surface Hard (7–2) Clay (23–7) Grass (0–0) Carpet (0–0)

Result	W–L	Date	Tournament	Tier	Surface	Opponents	Score
Win	1–0	Aug 2011	Austria F5	Futures	Clay	(Germany) Alexander Flock	6–2, 4–6, 6–1
Win	2–0	Aug 2011	Austria F7	Futures	Clay	(Germany) Kevin Krawietz	6–4, 6–3
Win	3–0	Sep 2011	Italy F26	Futures	Clay	(Italy) Marco Viola	6–3, 6–0
Win	4–0	Jun 2012	Slovenia F3	Futures	Clay	(Italy) Roberto Marcora	6–1, 6–3
Loss	4–1	Jun 2012	Italy F15	Futures	Clay	(Slovakia) Jozef Kovalík	2–6, 6–4, 2–6
Win	5–1	Aug 2012	Austria F7	Futures	Clay	(Czech Republic) Jaroslav Pospíšil	6–1, 6–4
Win	6–1	Aug 2012	Austria F8	Futures	Clay	(Slovakia) Miloslav Mečíř Jr.	6–4, 6–3
Win	7–1	Sep 2012	Italy F26	Futures	Clay	(Italy) Marco Crugnola	6–2, retired
Win	8–1	Sep 2012	Italy F28	Futures	Hard	(Colombia) Cristian Rodriguez	6–7^{(8–10)}, 6–1, 7–5
Loss	8–2	Nov 2012	Morocco F10	Futures	Clay	(Austria) Dominic Thiem	6–7^{(4–7)}, 1–6
Win	9–2	May 2013	Slovenia F1	Futures	Clay	(Slovenia) Tom Kočevar-Dešman	6–3, 6–2
Win	10–2	Jun 2013	Italy F11	Futures	Clay	(Italy) Thomas Fabbiano	6–2, 6–2
Win	11–2	Jul 2013	Italy F15	Futures	Clay	(Croatia) Marin Bradarić	7–5, 6–0
Loss	11–3	Jun 2014	Austria F1	Futures	Clay	(Czech Republic) Daniel Lustig	2–6, 2–6
Loss	11–4	Jun 2014	Austria F2	Futures	Clay	(Austria) Bastian Trinker	2–6, 3–6
Loss	11–5	Aug 2014	Austria F8	Futures	Clay	(Austria) Mario Haider-Maurer	6–4, 5–7, 5–7
Loss	11–6	Oct 2014	Greece F10	Futures	Hard	(Serbia) Ivan Bjelica	5-7, 3–6
Loss	11–7	Jan 2015	Turkey F4	Futures	Hard	(Brazil) José Pereira	5-7, 6–4, 2–6
Win	12–7	Feb 2015	Turkey F5	Futures	Hard	(Serbia) Nikola Milojević	7–6^{(7–2)}, 7–5
Win	13–7	Mar 2015	Croatia F5	Futures	Clay	(France) Mathias Bourgue	7–5, 6–4
Win	14–7	Mar 2015	Croatia F7	Futures	Clay	(Italy) Federico Gaio	6–4, 3–6, 6–4
Win	15–7	Apr 2015	Turkey F15	Futures	Hard	(France) Yannick Jankovits	6–4, 6–2
Win	16–7	May 2015	Turkey F18	Futures	Hard	(Austria) Lucas Miedler	6–3, 6–4
Win	17–7	May 2015	Turkey F19	Futures	Hard	(Italy) Erik Crepaldi	6–1, 6–1
Win	18–7	Aug 2015	Italy F25	Futures	Clay	(Italy) Francesco Picco	6–3, 3–6, 6–2
Win	19–7	May 2016	Croatia F5	Futures	Clay	(Croatia) Kristijan Mesaroš	6–4, 7–5
Win	20–7	May 2016	Croatia F7	Futures	Clay	(Hungary) Péter Nagy	7–6^{(7–3)}, 6–0
Win	21–7	May 2016	Italy F13	Futures	Clay	(Italy) Matteo Viola	2–6, 6–1, 6–1
Win	22–7	Jun 2016	Turkey F24	Futures	Hard	(Germany) Marc Sieber	0–6, 6–1, 6–4
Win	23–7	Jun 2016	Turkey F25	Futures	Hard	(Turkey) Cem İlkel	7–5, 7–5
Win	24–7	Jun 2016	Turkey F26	Futures	Clay	(Spain) Rubén Ramírez Hidalgo	6–4, 6–3
Loss	24–8	Aug 2016	Austria F8	Futures	Clay	(Austria) Sebastian Ofner	5-7, 4–6
Win	25–8	Oct 2016	Croatia F9	Futures	Clay	(France) Alexandre Müller	6–4, 6–1
Win	26–8	Oct 2016	Croatia F10	Futures	Clay	(Bosnia and Herzegovina) Tomislav Brkić	6–3, 6–3
Loss	26–9	Oct 2016	Croatia F11	Futures	Clay	(Czech Republic) Jaroslav Pospíšil	3-6, 0-0 ret.
Win	27–9	Nov 2016	Morocco F7	Futures	Clay	(Croatia) Kristijan Mesaroš	6–4, 4–6, 6–4
Win	28–9	Mar 2017	Croatia F2	Futures	Clay	(Czech Republic) Zdeněk Kolář	6–4, 6–3
Win	29–9	Jun 2018	Italy F13	Futures	Clay	(Switzerland) Johan Nikles	6–1, 3–6, 6–3
Win	30–9	Jun 2018	Italy F14	Futures	Clay	(Slovenia) Nik Razboršek	6–4, 6–3
Abandoned	30–9	Jan 2019	M15 Antalya, Turkey	World Tennis Tour	Clay	(Italy) Davide Galoppini	cancelled due to poor weather

=== Doubles: 13 (3–10) ===
Legend (doubles) ATP Challenger Tour (0–0) ITF Futures Tour (3–10)	Titles by surface Hard (0–4) Clay (3–6) Grass (0–0) Carpet (0–0)

Result	W–L	Date	Tournament	Tier	Surface	Partner	Opponents	Score
Loss	0–1	Sep 2010	Italy F27	Futures	Hard (i)	(Georgia (country)) Lado Chikhladze	(Italy) Claudio Grassi (Italy) Erik Crepaldi	3–6, 4–6
Loss	0–2	Jul 2011	Austria F1	Futures	Clay	(Austria) Lukas Jastraunig	(Austria) Gerald Melzer (Austria) Marc Rath	1–6, 5–7
Loss	0–3	Jul 2011	Austria F3	Futures	Clay	(Austria) Gerald Melzer	(Hungary) Kornél Bardóczky (Croatia) Mislav Hižak	6–7^{(2–7)}, 4–6
Win	1–3	Jul 2011	Austria F4	Futures	Clay	(Austria) Gerald Melzer	(Spain) Óscar Sabate-Bretos (Chile) RÓscar Sabate-Bretos	7–5, 7–5
Loss	1–4	Jul 2012	Czech Republic F4	Futures	Clay	(Austria) Dominic Thiem	(Czech Republic) Adam Pavlásek (Czech Republic) Jiří Veselý	6–7^{(2–7)}, 4–6
Loss	1–5	Nov 2012	Morocco F9	Futures	Clay	(Austria) Dominic Thiem	(Spain) Juan-Samuel Arauzo-Martínez (Spain) Enrique López Pérez	2–6, 7–5, [7–10]
Loss	1–6	Nov 2012	Morocco F10	Futures	Clay	(Austria) Dominic Thiem	(Hungary) Márton Fucsovics (Republic of Ireland) Daniel Glancy	2–6, 3–6
Loss	1–7	Sep 2014	Croatia F18	Futures	Clay	(Italy) Riccardo Sinicropi	(Slovenia) Janez Semrajc (Slovenia) Tomislav Ternar	6–3, 3–6, [10-12]
Win	2–7	Sep 2014	Croatia F20	Futures	Clay	(Austria) Thomas Statzberger	(Germany) Tim Nekic (Croatia) Antun Vidak	3–6, 6–4, [10-4]
Loss	2–8	Apr 2015	Turkey F15	Futures	Hard	(Austria) Pascal Brunner	(United Kingdom) Richard Gabb (Austria) Maximilian Neuchrist	2–6, 3–6
Loss	2–9	Jan 2016	Turkey F4	Futures	Hard	(Austria) Pascal Brunner	(Japan) Soichiro Moritani (Japan) Issei Okamura	3–6, 4–6
Loss	2–10	Feb 2016	Turkey F5	Futures	Hard	(Austria) Lenny Hampel	(Japan) Soichiro Moritani (Japan) Issei Okamura	2–6, 2–6
Win	3–10	Feb 2019	M15 Antalya, Turkey	World Tennis Tour	Clay	(Kazakhstan) Dmitry Popko	(Argentina) Hernán Casanova (Argentina) Tomás Lipovšek Puches	6–4, 7–6^{(7–3)}
