= Julian Reister =

German tennis player (born 1986)

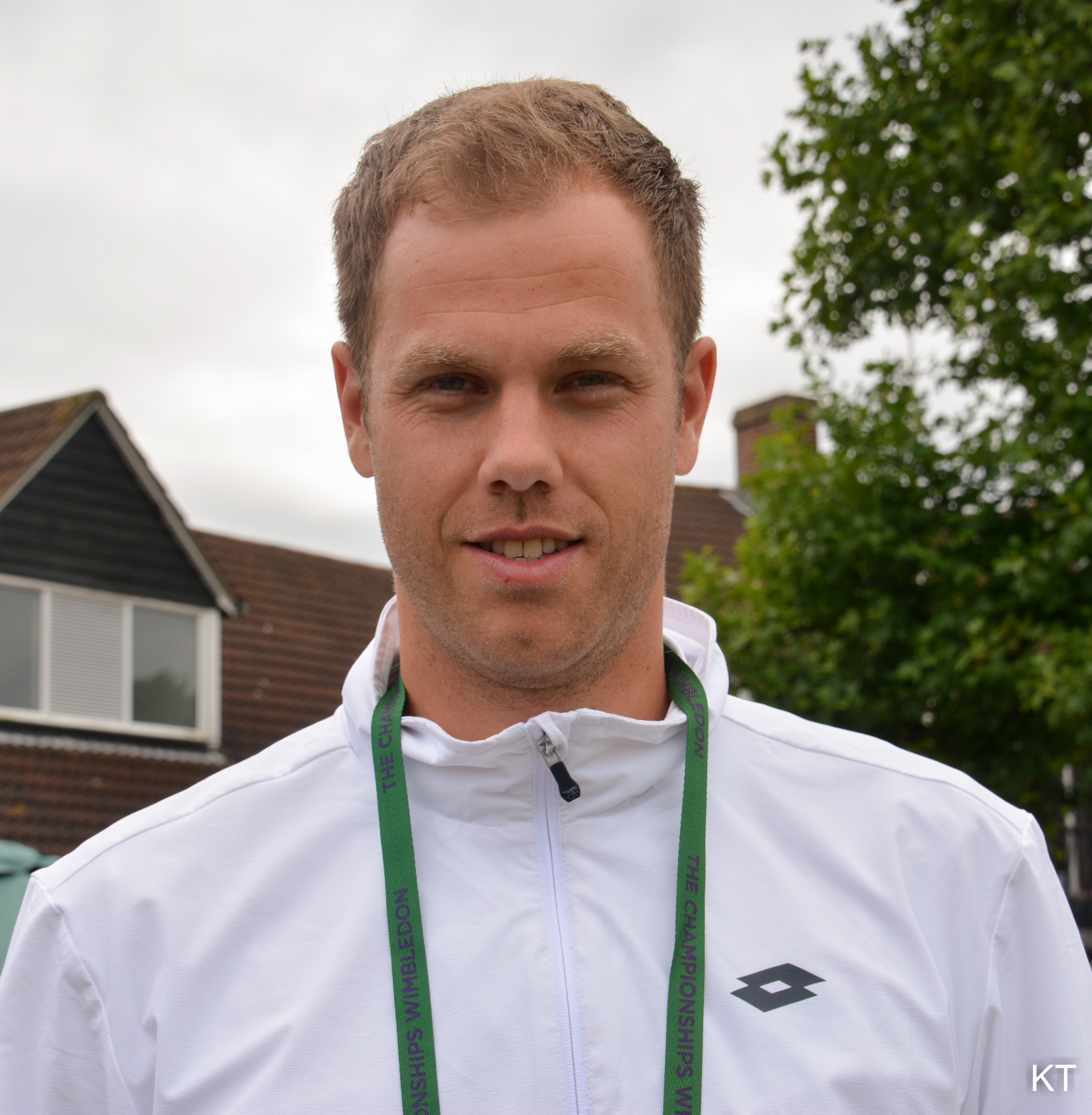
- Country (sports): Germany
- Residence: Reinbek, Germany
- Born: 2 April 1986 (age 40) Hamburg, West Germany
- Height: 1.88 m (6 ft 2 in)
- Turned pro: 2005
- Retired: 2016
- Plays: Right-handed (one-handed backhand)
- Prize money: $ 858,433

Singles
- Career record: 14–34
- Career titles: 0
- Highest ranking: No. 83 (11 November 2013)

Grand Slam singles results
- Australian Open: 1R (2013, 2014)
- French Open: 3R (2010)
- Wimbledon: 2R (2010, 2013, 2014)
- US Open: Q2 (2009, 2013)

Doubles
- Career record: 0–3
- Career titles: 0
- Highest ranking: No. 431 (28 August 2006)
- Last updated on: 25 June 2021.

Julian Reister (German pronunciation: [juˈli̯aːn ˈʁaɪstɐ]; born 2 April 1986) is a German retired professional tennis player. His career-high singles ranking is world No. 83, achieved in November 2013. Reister reached the quarterfinals of Buenos Aires in 2013 as a qualifier.

== Career ==
=== 2006 ===
Reister qualified for his first ATP World Tour tournament at Basel where he lost in the first round to Guillermo García-López 6–7^{(4)}, 2–6.

=== 2007 ===
Reister entered Basel as a qualifier where he lost in the first round to Roko Karanušić 0–6, 3–6.

=== 2010 ===
Reister qualified into the main draw at Brisbane where he lost in the first round to Florent Serra 7–6^{(3)}, 6–7^{(5)}, 5–7.

Reister next qualified into the main draw at the French Open. He defeated 27th seed Feliciano López in the first round 6–1, 7–6^{(5)}, 6–2 to record his first ever ATP World Tour victory. He went on to defeat Olivier Rochus in the second round 6–2, 6–2, 7–6^{(5)} before losing to Roger Federer in straight sets 4–6, 0–6, 4–6.

Reister next made it into the main draw of the 2010 Wimbledon Championships as a lucky loser. He advanced to the 2nd round by defeating qualifier Rik de Voest 6–4, 7–5, 3–6, 6–2. He then lost to Xavier Malisse 7–6^{(7)}, 4–6, 1–6, 4–6

Reister was given a wildcard into the ATP 500 2010 International German Open. In the first round he defeated fellow wild card Daniel Brands 6–2, 7–6^{(10)}. He then caused an upset in the second round defeating 12th seed Victor Hănescu 7–6^{(4)}, 6–4 before losing a close match to Denis Istomin in the third round 6–3, 3–6, 6–7^{(3)}.

=== 2011 ===
Reister won his first challenger title in Monza defeating Alessio Di Mauro in the final. He qualified for the 2011 BMW Open where he won his opening match over countryman Daniel Brands before losing to Nikolay Davydenko in a close match.

=== 2013 ===
Reister became only the second man in the history of professional tennis to record a golden set (first had been Bill Scanlon in 1983, Stefano Napolitano joined them in 2015).

In the first round of qualifying at the 2013 US Open, Reister defeated compatriot Tim Puetz 6–7^{(3)}, 6–4, 6–0. This is also the only match ever recorded with a golden set that lasted more than two sets.

Yaroslava Shvedova and Tine Scheuer-Larsen have also recorded golden sets against opponents.

== ATP Challenger and ITF Futures finals ==
=== Singles: 22 (6–16) ===
Legend ATP Challenger (5–7) ITF Futures (1–9)	Finals by surface Hard (0–2) Clay (5–13) Grass (0–0) Carpet (1–1)

Result	W–L	Date	Tournament	Tier	Surface	Opponent	Score
Loss	0–1	Jul 2005	Germany F8, Düsseldorf	Futures	Clay	(Sweden) Jacob Adaktusson	6–4, 2–6, 5–7
Loss	0–2	Apr 2006	Italy F11, Padova	Futures	Clay	(Italy) Daniele Giorgini	7–5, 1–6, 1–6
Loss	0–3	Jun 2006	Poland F6, Kraków	Futures	Clay	(Finland) Timo Nieminen	6–2, 3–6, 1–6
Loss	0–4	Jul 2006	Netherlands F2, Breda	Futures	Clay	(Australia) Clinton Thomson	6–3, 6–7^{(3–7)}, 3–6
Loss	0–5	Jul 2007	Germany F8, Kassel	Futures	Clay	(Argentina) Nicolas Todero	4–6, 6–3, 3–6
Loss	0–6	Aug 2007	Germany F14, Wahlstedt	Futures	Clay	(Germany) Andreas Beck	7–5, 2–6, 2–6
Loss	0–7	Sep 2008	Germany F18, Kempten	Futures	Clay	(Chile) Adrián García	2–6, 7–5, 3–6
Loss	0–8	Sep 2008	Trnava, Slovakia	Challenger	Clay	(Spain) Alberto Martín	2–6, 0–6
Loss	0–9	Jan 2009	Germany F3, Kaarst	Futures	Carpet	(Germany) Bastian Knittel	2–6, 4–6
Win	1–9	Feb 2009	Germany F5, Nussloch	Futures	Carpet	(United Kingdom) Jonathan Marray	6–2, 7–6^{(7–3)}
Loss	1–10	Apr 2009	Italy F7, Padova	Futures	Clay	(Argentina) Cristian Villagrán	6–1, 6–7^{(5–7)}, 0–6
Loss	1–11	Jun 2009	Constanța, Romania	Challenger	Clay	(Slovenia) Blaž Kavčič	6–3, 3–6, 4–6
Loss	1–12	Sep 2009	Banja Luka, Bosnia & Herzegovina	Challenger	Clay	(Spain) Daniel Gimeno-Traver	4–6, 1–6
Loss	1–13	Feb 2010	Kazan, Russia	Challenger	Hard	(Poland) Michał Przysiężny	6–7^{(5–7)}, 4–6
Win	2–13	Apr 2011	Monza, Italy	Challenger	Clay	(Italy) Alessio Di Mauro	2–6, 6–3, 6–3
Loss	2–14	Nov 2012	Montevideo, Uruguay	Challenger	Clay	(Argentina) Horacio Zeballos	3–6, 2–6
Win	3–14	Apr 2013	Rome, Italy	Challenger	Clay	(Spain) Guillermo García López	4–6, 6–3, 6–2
Win	4–14	Jun 2013	Blois, France	Challenger	Clay	(Serbia) Dušan Lajović	6–1, 6–7^{(3–7)}, 7–6^{(7–2)}
Win	5–14	Sep 2013	Trnava, Slovakia	Challenger	Clay	(Romania) Adrian Ungur	7–6^{(7–3)}, 6–3
Loss	5–15	Nov 2013	Seoul, South Korea	Challenger	Hard	(Serbia) Dušan Lajović	walkover
Loss	5–16	May 2014	Tunis, Tunisia	Challenger	Clay	(Italy) Simone Bolelli	4–6, 2–6
Win	6–16	May 2014	Rome, Italy	Challenger	Clay	(Uruguay) Pablo Cuevas	6–3, 6–2

=== Doubles: 8 (5–3) ===
Legend ATP Challenger (0–1) ITF Futures (5–2)	Finals by surface Hard (0–1) Clay (5–1) Grass (0–0) Carpet (0–1)

Result	W–L	Date	Tournament	Tier	Surface	Partner	Opponents	Score
Win	1–0	Sep 2005	Germany F14, Kempten	Futures	Clay	(Germany) Jerome Becker	(Jamaica) Dustin Brown (Germany) Tobias Klein	4–6, 6–4, 6–3
Win	2–0	Sep 2005	Germany F15, Friedberg	Futures	Clay	(Germany) Jerome Becker	(Jamaica) Dustin Brown (Germany) Tobias Klein	6–4, 6–3
Loss	2–1	Mar 2006	Switzerland F2, Leuggern	Futures	Carpet	(Germany) Jerome Becker	(Jamaica) Dustin Brown (Germany) Tobias Klein	6–4, 3–6, 6–7^{(2–7)}
Win	3–1	Aug 2006	Germany F10, Ingolstadt	Futures	Clay	(Germany) Tobias Kamke	(Netherlands) Michel Meijer (Netherlands) Antal Van Der Duim	3–6, 6–2, 6–0
Win	4–1	Aug 2006	Germany F12, Wahlstedt	Futures	Clay	(Sweden) Karl Norberg	(France) Alexandre Renard (France) Heiner Tadault	7–5, 6–3
Win	5–1	Aug 2007	Germany F14, Wahlstedt	Futures	Clay	(Germany) Tobias Kamke	(Russia) Ruslan Chomaev (Russia) Nikolai Soloviev	6–2, 6–0
Loss	5–2	Aug 2008	Germany F16, Wahlstedt	Futures	Clay	(Denmark) Martin Pedersen	(Germany) Sebastian Rieschick (Russia) Dmitri Sitak	5–7, 1–6
Loss	5–3	Feb 2010	Kazan, Russia	Challenger	Hard	(Germany) Tobias Kamke	(Czech Republic) Jan Mertl (Kazakhstan) Yuri Schukin	2–6, 4–6

== Singles performance timeline ==
Key
W	F	SF	QF	#R	RR	Q#	DNQ	A	NH

(W) winner; (F) finalist; (SF) semifinalist; (QF) quarterfinalist; (#R) rounds 4, 3, 2, 1; (RR) round-robin stage; (Q#) qualification round; (DNQ) did not qualify; (A) absent; (NH) not held; (SR) strike rate (events won / competed); (W–L) win–loss record.

Tournament	2007	2008	2009	2010	2011	2012	2013	2014	2015	2016	SR	W–L	Win %
Grand Slam tournaments
Australian Open	A	Q2	A	Q1	A	A	1R	1R	A	A	0 / 2	0–2	0%
French Open	A	A	Q2	3R	1R	A	1R	Q2	Q1	Q1	0 / 3	2–3	40%
Wimbledon	A	A	Q1	2R	1R	A	2R	2R	Q2	Q2	0 / 4	3–4	43%
US Open	A	A	Q2	A	A	A	Q2	A	A	A	0 / 0	0–0	–
Win–loss	0–0	0–0	0–0	3–2	0–2	0–0	1–3	1–2	0–0	0–0	0 / 9	5–9	36%
ATP Tour Masters 1000
Indian Wells	A	A	A	A	Q1	A	A	A	A	A	0 / 0	0–0	–
Miami Open	A	A	A	A	Q2	A	A	Q1	A	A	0 / 0	0–0	–
Hamburg	Q1	A	Not Masters Series								0 / 0	0–0	–
Rome	A	A	A	A	Q1	A	A	A	A	A	0 / 0	0–0	–
Win–loss	0–0	0–0	0–0	0–0	0–0	0–0	0–0	0–0	0–0	0–0	0 / 0	0–0	–
Career statistics
Overall win–loss	0–0	0–0	0–0	5–5	3–7	1–2	3–6	1–10	1–2	0–0	0 / 34	14–34	29%
Year-end ranking		282	173	114	231	296	86	184	563	637	Prize Money: $858,260		

^{1}Including Win–loss 2006 (0–1), 2007 (0–1)
