= Alberto Brizzi =

Italian tennis player

- Country (sports): Italy
- Born: 26 March 1984 (age 41) Breno, Italy
- Turned pro: 2003
- Retired: 2016 (inactive)
- Plays: Right-handed
- Prize money: $220,823

Singles
- Career record: 0–1
- Career titles: 0
- Highest ranking: No. 230 (8 February 2010)
- Current ranking: No. 642 (17 July 2017)

Grand Slam singles results
- Australian Open: Q2 (2011)
- French Open: Q2 (2008)
- Wimbledon: –
- US Open: Q1 (2008)

Doubles
- Career titles: 0
- Highest ranking: No. 253 (15 August 2011)
- Current ranking: –

Grand Slam doubles results
- Australian Open: –
- French Open: –
- Wimbledon: –
- US Open: –
- Last updated on: July 17, 2017.

Alberto Brizzi (born 26 March 1984) is an Italian former professional tennis player. On 8 February 2010 he reached his highest ATP singles ranking of 230 while his best doubles ranking was 253 on 15 August 2011.
