= Kamil Čapkovič =

Slovak tennis player (born 1986)

- Country (sports): Slovakia
- Residence: Bratislava, Slovak Republic
- Born: 2 June 1986 (age 39) Michalovce, Slovak Republic
- Height: 1.96 m (6 ft 5 in)
- Plays: Right-handed (two-handed backhand)
- Prize money: $229,227

Singles
- Career record: 0–1 (Tour Level)
- Career titles: 0 ATP
- Highest ranking: No. 211 (28 September 2009)

Grand Slam singles results
- Australian Open: Q2 (2012)
- French Open: Q1 (2012)
- Wimbledon: Q2 (2012)

Doubles
- Career record: 0–0 (Tour Level)
- Career titles: 0 ATP
- Highest ranking: No. 168 (23 July 2007)

Kamil Čapkovič (Slovak pronunciation: [ˈkamil ˈtʂapkɔʋitʂ]; born 2 June 1986) is a professional Slovak tennis player. He was born in Michalovce, Slovak Republic.

== Career ==
In 2000, Čapkovič dominated the U14 circuit in the Tennis Europe Junior Tour, winning titles in Arezzo, Livorno, and Nymburk, as well as the prestigious European Junior Championships at San Remo, in which he won the title in both the singles and doubles tournaments. In the latter, he was paired with fellow countryman Peter Miklusicak, and in the final, they beat Daniel Müller and Andreas Weber of Germany. He thus became just the third player to win both the singles and doubles tournaments in the U14 events, only after Johan Sjögren in 1977 and Florian Loddenkemper in 1984.

Čapkovič has spent most of his time on the Futures and Challenger circuits, where he has won several Futures titles.

== Singles Titles ==
Legend (singles)
Grand Slam (0)
Tennis Masters Cup (0)
ATP Masters Series (0)
ATP Tour (0)
Challengers (0)
Futures (14)

No.	Date	Tournament	Surface	Opponent	Score
1.	June 14, 2004	Koper	Clay	(Spain) Javier García-Sintes	6–7^{(5–7)}, 7–6^{(7–3)}, 6–4
2.	June 14, 2005	Belgrade	Clay	(Austria) Max Raditschnigg	6–2, 6–2
3.	June 19, 2006	L'Aquila	Clay	(Slovakia) Lukáš Lacko	6–2, 7–6^{(8–6)}
4.	September 4, 2006	Gliwice	Clay	(Russia) Denis Matsukevich	6–4, 6–1
5.	September 1, 2008	Vienna	Clay	(Czech Republic) Michal Tabara	3–6, 7–6^{(7–3)}, 6–2
6.	October 13, 2008	Lagos	Hard	(Russia) Ilya Belyaev	6–3, 6–2
7.	October 20, 2008	Lagos	Hard	(India) Divij Sharan	6–4, 4–6, 6–4
8.	November 24, 2008	Libreville	Hard	(Romania) Petru-Alexandru Luncanu	7–5, 6–4
9.	March 10, 2009	Faro	Hard	(Austria) Armin Sandbichler	3–6, 6–4, 6–0
10.	June 29, 2009	Bologna	Clay	(Italy) Stefano Galvani	6–7^{(4–7)}, 6–3, 6–1
11.	March 1, 2011	Faro	Hard	(Portugal) Pedro Sousa	6–4, 3–6, 6–2
12.	October 24, 2011	Lagos	Hard	(India) Vijayant Malik	6–2, 7–5
13.	July 23, 2013	Michalovce	Clay	(Slovakia) Juraj Masár	6–4, 3–6, 6–3
14.	August 6, 2013	Trnava	Clay	(Slovakia) Adrian Sikora	7–6^{(7–5)}, 7–5
