= Dušan Lojda =

Czech tennis player

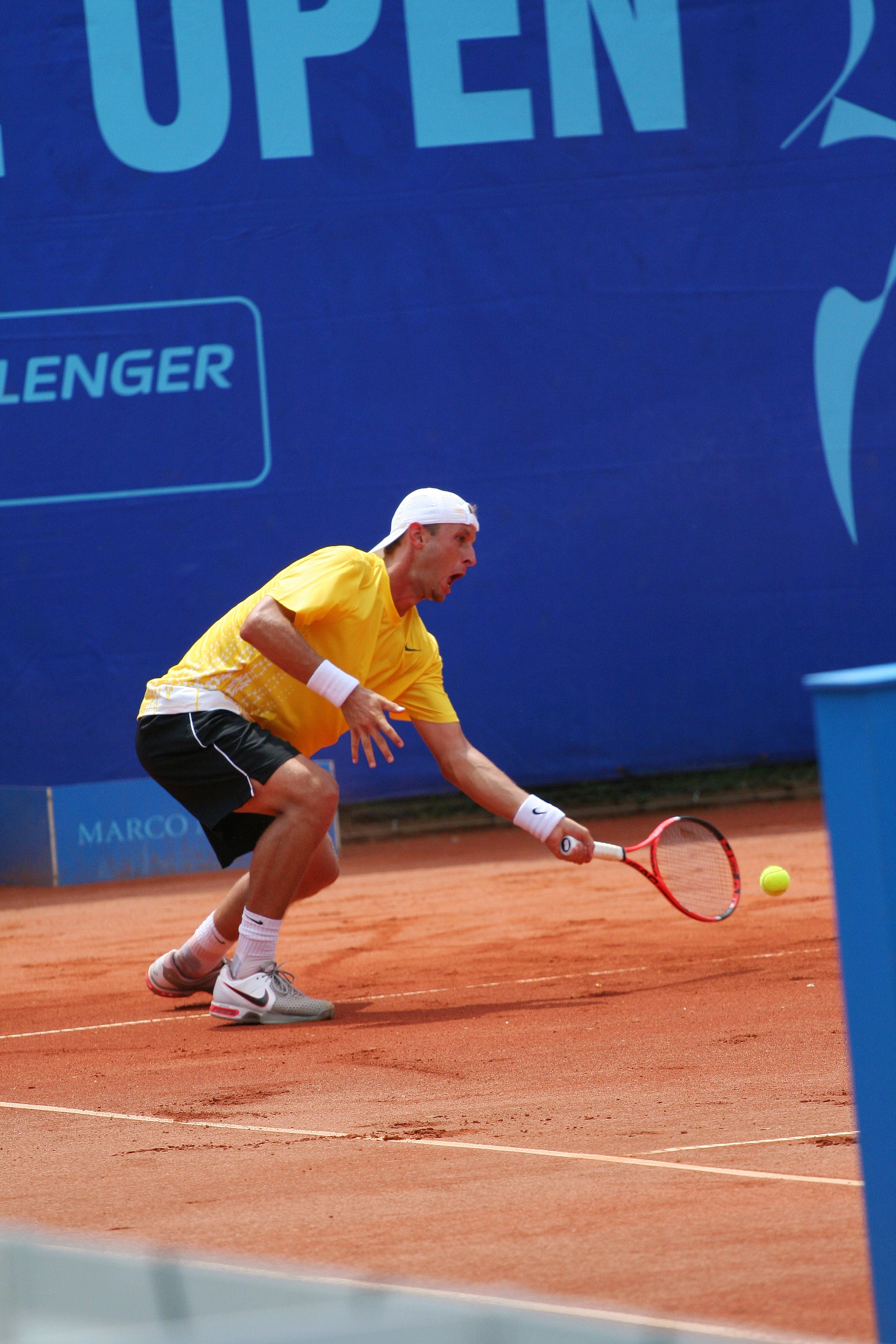
- Country (sports): Czech Republic
- Residence: Prostějov, Czech Republic
- Born: 8 March 1988 (age 37); Ivančice, Czechoslovakia
- Height: 6 ft 2 in (188 cm)
- Turned pro: 2005
- Retired: 2016 (last match played)
- Plays: Left-handed (two-handed backhand)
- Prize money: $302,444

Singles
- Career record: 0–1 (at ATP Tour level, Grand Slam level, and in Davis Cup)
- Career titles: 0
- Highest ranking: No. 161 (26 July 2010)

Grand Slam singles results
- Australian Open: Q2 (2011)
- French Open: Q2 (2010, 2013)
- Wimbledon: Q1 (2010, 2011, 2012, 2013)
- US Open: 1R (2010)

Doubles
- Career record: 0–0 (at ATP Tour level, Grand Slam level, and in Davis Cup)
- Career titles: 0
- Highest ranking: No. 285 (23 April 2012)
- Last updated on: 6 June 2021.

Dušan Lojda (born 8 March 1988) is a Czech tennis coach and former professional player. He was the 2006 US Open – Boys' singles champion for tennis.

== Career ==
Lojda won the 2006 US Open – Boys' singles title as the number 10 seed, beating Canadian Peter Polansky in the final and becoming the first Czech to claim the title. In May 2007 he won his first senior title at the 2007 ECM Prague Open – Men's singles, defeating countryman Jiří Vaněk in the final. He broke into the top 300 in May 2007 but fell out after a week. He reached his career-high ranking of #161 on 26 July 2010.

== Performance timeline ==
Key
W	F	SF	QF	#R	RR	Q#	DNQ	A	NH

(W) winner; (F) finalist; (SF) semifinalist; (QF) quarterfinalist; (#R) rounds 4, 3, 2, 1; (RR) round-robin stage; (Q#) qualification round; (DNQ) did not qualify; (A) absent; (NH) not held; (SR) strike rate (events won / competed); (W–L) win–loss record.
To avoid confusion and double counting, these charts are updated at the conclusion of a tournament or when the player's participation has ended.

=== Singles ===
Tournament	2007	2008	2009	2010	2011	2012	2013	SR	W–L	Win %
Grand Slam tournaments
Australian Open	A	A	A	Q1	Q2	Q1	A	0 / 0	0–0	–
French Open	A	A	A	Q2	Q1	Q1	Q2	0 / 0	0–0	–
Wimbledon	A	A	A	Q1	Q1	Q1	Q1	0 / 0	0–0	–
US Open	Q1	A	A	1R	Q2	A	Q1	0 / 1	0–1	0%
Win–loss	0–0	0–0	0–0	0–1	0–0	0–0	0–0	0 / 1	0–1	0%

== ATP Challenger and ITF Futures Finals ==
=== Singles: 29 (19–10) ===
Legend (singles) ATP Challenger Tour (1–1) ITF World Tennis Tour (18–9)	Finals by surface Hard (1–2) Clay (18–8) Grass (0–0) Carpet (0–0)

Result	W–L	Date	Tournament	Tier	Surface	Opponent	Score
Win	1–0	Jun 2006	Tunisia F1, Sousse	Futures	Clay	(Morocco) Mounir El Aarej	6–3, 6–2
Loss	1–1	Aug 2006	Croatia F3, Vinkovci	Futures	Clay	(North Macedonia) Predrag Rusevski	6–3, 6–7^{(5–7)}, 5–7
Loss	1–2	Mar 2007	Israel F2, Ramat HaSharon	Futures	Hard	(Slovakia) Jan Stancik	3–6, 4–6
Win	2–2	May 2007	Prague, Czech Republic	Challenger	Clay	(Czech Republic) Jiří Vaněk	6–7^{(3–7)}, 6–2, 7–6^{(7–5)}
Win	3–2	Aug 2008	Slovakia F2, Piešťany	Futures	Clay	(Slovakia) Andrej Martin	6–1, 6–3
Win	4–2	Aug 2008	Austria F7, St. Polten	Futures	Clay	(Austria) Nicolas Reissig	7–6^{(7–5)}, 4–6, 6–3
Loss	4–3	Oct 2008	Portugal F7, Porto	Futures	Clay	(Czech Republic) Jan Hájek	0–6, 6–7^{(2–7)}
Win	5–3	Feb 2009	Egypt F1, Giza	Futures	Clay	(Romania) Teodor-Dacian Crăciun	4–6, 6–4, 6–4
Win	6–3	Mar 2009	Portugal F1, Faro	Futures	Hard	(Bosnia and Herzegovina) Aldin Šetkić	6–2, 2–6, 6–3
Loss	6–4	May 2009	Slovenia F1, Domžale	Futures	Clay	(Slovakia) Andrej Martin	3–6, 7–5, 6–7^{(5–7)}
Win	7–4	Aug 2009	Poland F5, Poznań	Futures	Clay	(Serbia) David Savić	6–1, 4–6, 7–6^{(7–5)}
Loss	7–5	Nov 2009	Seoul, South Korea	Challenger	Hard	(Slovakia) Lukáš Lacko	4–6, 2–6
Win	8–5	May 2010	Poland F2, Kraków	Futures	Clay	(Chile) Adrián García	6–2, 7–5
Win	9–5	Jun 2010	Poland F4, Gliwice	Futures	Clay	(Poland) Jerzy Janowicz	7–6^{(9–7)}, 7–6^{(8–6)}
Win	10–5	Jul 2011	Germany F7, Kassel	Futures	Clay	(Germany) Kevin Krawietz	4–6, 6–0, 6–3
Win	11–5	Aug 2011	Poland F5, Bydgoszcz	Futures	Clay	(Poland) Piotr Gadomski	6–0, 6–3
Loss	11–6	Oct 2011	Croatia F13, Dubrovnik	Futures	Clay	(Spain) Javier Martí	4–6, 2–6
Win	12–6	Aug 2012	Poland F4, Bydgoszcz	Futures	Clay	(Poland) Michał Przysiężny	6–2, 3–6, 7–5
Win	13–6	Aug 2012	Poland F5, Poznań	Futures	Clay	(Poland) Grzegorz Panfil	6–3, 2–6, 6–1
Loss	13–7	Oct 2012	Croatia F11, Dubrovnik	Futures	Clay	(Slovakia) Andrej Martin	5–7, 6–3, 1–6
Win	14–7	Oct 2012	Croatia F12, Dubrovnik	Futures	Clay	(Czech Republic) Jaroslav Pospíšil	6–2, 6–3
Loss	14–8	Jun 2013	Italy F13, Busto Arsizio	Futures	Clay	(Italy) Simone Vagnozzi	6–4, 3–6, 0–6
Win	15–8	Jun 2014	Poland F2, Bydgoszcz	Futures	Clay	(Czech Republic) Václav Šafránek	6–3, 5–7, 7–6^{(8–6)}
Win	16–8	Jul 2014	Austria F5, Bad Waltersdorf	Futures	Clay	(Slovakia) Karol Beck	6–3, 5–7, 6–4
Loss	16–9	Aug 2014	Poland F6, Bytom	Futures	Clay	(Czech Republic) Marek Michalička	1–6, 1–6
Win	17–9	Sep 2014	Poland F7, Piekary Śląskie	Futures	Clay	(Poland) Kamil Majchrzak	4–6, 6–3, 7–6^{(7–3)}
Win	18–9	Jan 2015	Egypt F1, Cairo	Futures	Clay	(Slovakia) Adrian Partl	6–4, 0–6, 7–5
Win	19–9	Mar 2015	Croatia F6, Rovinj	Futures	Clay	(France) Mathias Bourgue	7–6^{(9–7)}, 1–6, 6–4
Loss	19–10	Oct 2015	Croatia F18, Solin	Futures	Clay	(Czech Republic) Václav Šafránek	6–7^{(2–7)}, 2–6

=== Doubles: 6 (2–4) ===
Legend (doubles) ATP Challenger Tour (0–1) ITF World Tennis Tour (2–3)	Finals by surface Hard (0–1) Clay (2–3) Grass (0–0) Carpet (0–0)

Result	W–L	Date	Tournament	Tier	Surface	Partner	Opponents	Score
Loss	0–1	Feb 2006	Israel F1, Ramat HaSharon	Futures	Hard	(Belgium) Niels Desein	(France) Antoine Benneteau (France) Frederic Jeanclaude	6–7^{(2–7)}, 6–7^{(4–7)}
Loss	0–2	Jun 2006	Tunisia F1, Sousse	Futures	Clay	(Belgium) Niels Desein	(Morocco) Mounir El Aarej (Tunisia) Walid Jallali	4–6, 3–6
Win	1–2	Jul 2008	Italy F20, Bologna	Futures	Clay	(Italy) Federico Torresi	(Italy) Andrea Fava (Italy) Matteo Viola	6–0, 6–4
Loss	1–3	Sep 2011	Brașov, Romania	Challenger	Clay	(France) Benoît Paire	(Romania) Victor-Mugurel Anagnastopol (Romania) Florin Mergea	2–6, 3–6
Win	2–3	Nov 2014	Morocco F4, Casablanca	Futures	Clay	(Netherlands) Matwé Middelkoop	(Morocco) Yassine Idmbarek (Morocco) Mehdi Jdi	6–1, 6–2
Loss	2–4	Jul 2015	Czech Republic F6, Brno	Futures	Clay	(Czech Republic) Václav Šafránek	(Belarus) Uladzimir Ignatik (Czech Republic) Roman Jebavý	1–6, 4–6

== Junior Grand Slam finals ==
=== Singles: 1 (1 title) ===
Result	Year	Tournament	Surface	Opponent	Score
Win	2006	US Open	Hard	(Canada) Peter Polansky	7–6^{(7–4)}, 6–3
