= Pavol Červenák =

Slovak tennis player (born 1987)

- Country (sports): Slovakia
- Residence: Bratislava, Slovakia
- Born: 1 July 1987 (age 38) Bratislava, Slovakia, Czechoslovakia
- Height: 1.85 m (6 ft 1 in)
- Turned pro: 2004
- Plays: Right-handed (two-handed backhand)
- Coach: Marc-Kevin Goellner
- Prize money: $301,988

Singles
- Career record: 7–5
- Career titles: 0
- Highest ranking: No. 169 (10 September 2012)

Grand Slam singles results
- Australian Open: Q2 (2009)
- French Open: Q3 (2010, 2013)
- Wimbledon: Q2 (2007)
- US Open: Q1 (2011)

Doubles
- Career record: 0–0
- Career titles: 0
- Highest ranking: No. 253 (22 July 2013)
- Last updated on: 13 February 2022.

Pavol Červenák (Slovak pronunciation: [ˈpaʋɔl ˈtʂerʋenaːk]; born 1 July 1987), is a professional tennis player from Slovak Republic.

== 2012 ==
Pavol Červenák defeated Tommy Haas in the Stuttgart claycourt tournament at the second round stage.(6–4, 6–4).

== ATP Challenger and ITF Futures finals ==
=== Singles: 16 (8–8) ===
Legend ATP Challenger (0–1) ITF Futures (8–7)	Finals by surface Hard (0–2) Clay (8–6) Grass (0–0) Carpet (0–0)

Result	W–L	Date	Tournament	Tier	Surface	Opponent	Score
Loss	0-1	May 2006	Romania F1, Bucharest	Futures	Clay	(France) Jordane Doble	1–6, 4–6
Win	1-1	May 2006	Ukraine F2, Kyiv	Futures	Clay	(Germany) Bastian Knittel	6–3, 6–4
Win	2-1	Jul 2006	Italy F21, Bologna	Futures	Clay	(Italy) Giancarlo Petrazzuolo	6–7^{(3–7)}, 6–4, 6–1
Win	3-1	Jul 2006	Italy F22, Carpi	Futures	Clay	(Italy) Francesco Piccari	6–1, ret.
Win	4-1	Jul 2006	Belgium F1, Waterloo	Futures	Clay	(Czech Republic) Lukáš Rosol	6–4, 6–4
Loss	4-2	May 2008	Poland F1, Katowice	Futures	Clay	(Spain) Guillermo Olaso	6–7^{(10–12)}, 3–6
Win	5-2	Aug 2008	Russia F3, Moscow	Futures	Clay	(Moldova) Andrei Gorban	6–2, 6–2
Loss	5-3	Oct 2008	France F19, La Roche-sur-Yon	Futures	Hard	(Belgium) Niels Desein	4–6, 1–6
Win	6-3	May 2009	Poland F1, Katowice	Futures	Clay	(Russia) Denis Matsukevich	6–3, 6–1
Win	7-3	Jul 2009	Germany F11, Cologne	Futures	Clay	(France) Antony Dupuis	6–2, 6–2
Loss	7-4	Oct 2009	Spain F34, Córdoba	Futures	Hard	(Spain) Adrián Menéndez Maceiras	3–6, 3–6
Loss	7-5	Mar 2010	Turkey F2, Antalya	Futures	Clay	(Italy) Thomas Fabbiano	3–6, 4–6
Win	8-5	Mar 2010	Turkey F3, Antalya	Futures	Clay	(France) Maxime Teixeira	6–1, 6–3
Loss	8-6	Sep 2011	Trnava, Slovakia	Challenger	Clay	(Spain) Íñigo Cervantes Huegun	4–6, 6–7^{(3–7)}
Loss	8-7	Feb 2012	Egypt F2, Cairo	Futures	Clay	(Russia) Andrey Kuznetsov	3–6, 3–6
Loss	8-8	Mar 2012	Turkey F10, Antalya	Futures	Clay	(Netherlands) Nick van der Meer	6–7^{(9–11)}, 1–6

=== Doubles: 7 (3–4) ===
Legend ATP Challenger (1–1) ITF Futures (2–3)	Finals by surface Hard (0–2) Clay (3–2) Grass (0–0) Carpet (0–0)

Result	W–L	Date	Tournament	Tier	Surface	Partner	Opponents	Score
Loss	0–1	Jun 2006	Czech Republic F3, Karlovy Vary	Futures	Clay	(Slovakia) Kamil Čapkovič	(Czech Republic) Daniel Lustig (Slovakia) Filip Polášek	3–6, 6–1, 1–6
Loss	0–2	Oct 2006	France F16, Nevers	Futures	Hard	(Ukraine) Sergey Bubka	(France) Jean-François Bachelot (France) David Guez	3–6, 4–6
Win	1–2	Mar 2007	Morocco F2, Rabat	Futures	Clay	(Slovakia) Kamil Čapkovič	(Germany) Torsten Popp (Russia) Yuri Schukin	6–2, 6–0
Win	2–2	Aug 2008	Russia F3, Moscow	Futures	Clay	(Slovakia) Alexander Somogyi	(Ukraine) Vladyslav Klymenko (Ukraine) Artem Smirnov	7–6^{(7–1)}, 7–6^{(7–5)}
Loss	2–3	Apr 2010	Turkey F6, Antalya	Futures	Clay	(Czech Republic) Ladislav Chramosta	(Chile) Hans Podlipnik Castillo (Chile) Ricardo Urzua-Rivera	4–6, 6–4, [12–14]
Loss	2–4	Feb 2011	Caloundra, Australia	Challenger	Hard	(Slovakia) Ivo Klec	(Australia) Matthew Ebden (Australia) Sam Groth	3–6, 6–3, [1–10]
Win	3–4	Apr 2013	Santos, Brazil	Challenger	Clay	(Italy) Matteo Viola	(Portugal) Gastão Elias (Brazil) Guilherme Clezar	6–2, 4–6, [10–6]

== Performance timeline ==
Key
W	F	SF	QF	#R	RR	Q#	DNQ	A	NH

(W) winner; (F) finalist; (SF) semifinalist; (QF) quarterfinalist; (#R) rounds 4, 3, 2, 1; (RR) round-robin stage; (Q#) qualification round; (DNQ) did not qualify; (A) absent; (NH) not held; (SR) strike rate (events won / competed); (W–L) win–loss record.

=== Singles ===
Tournament	2007	2008	2009	2010	2011	2012	2013	SR	W–L	Win%
Grand Slam tournaments
Australian Open	Q1	A	Q2	Q1	Q1	Q1	Q1	0 / 0	0–0	–
French Open	A	A	A	Q3	A	Q2	Q3	0 / 0	0–0	–
Wimbledon	Q2	A	A	Q1	Q1	Q1	Q1	0 / 0	0–0	–
US Open	A	A	A	A	Q1	A	A	0 / 0	0–0	–
Win–loss	0–0	0–0	0–0	0–0	0–0	0–0	0–0	0 / 0	0–0	–
