= STRABAG Challenger Open =

Trnava Challenger

Defunct tennis tournament
- Event name: STRABAG Challenger Open (2016), Arimex ATP Challenger Trophy (2012-2015), ATP Challenger Trophy (-2011)
- Location: Trnava, Slovakia
- Venue: TC EMPIRE Trnava
- Category: ATP Challenger Tour
- Surface: Clay (red)
- Draw: 32S/21Q/16D
- Prize money: €42,500+H

The STRABAG Challenger Open was a professional tennis tournament played on outdoor red clay courts, held annually at the TC EMPIRE Trnava in Trnava, Slovakia, from 2007 until 2016. It was part of the ATP Challenger Tour.

== Past finals ==
=== Singles ===
Year	Champion	Runner-up	Score
2016	(Belgium) Steve Darcis	(Spain) Jordi Samper-Montaña	6–3, 6–4
2015	(Netherlands) Robin Haase	(Argentina) Horacio Zeballos	6–4, 6–1
2014	(Austria) Andreas Haider-Maurer	(Croatia) Antonio Veić	2–6, 6–3, 7–6^{(7–4)}
2013	(Germany) Julian Reister	(Romania) Adrian Ungur	7–6^{(7–3)}, 6–3
2012	(Russia) Andrey Kuznetsov	(Romania) Adrian Ungur	6–3, 6–3
2011	(Spain) Iñigo Cervantes-Huegun	(Slovakia) Pavol Červenák	6–4, 7–6^{(7–3)}
2010	(Czech Republic) Jaroslav Pospíšil	(Kazakhstan) Yuri Schukin	6–4, 4–6, 6–3
2009	(Ukraine) Oleksandr Dolgopolov Jr.	(Algeria) Lamine Ouahab	6–2, 6–2
2008	(Spain) Alberto Martín	(Germany) Julian Reister	6–2, 6–0
2007	(Czech Republic) Jan Hernych	(Czech Republic) Tomáš Zíb	6–3, 3–6, 6–4

=== Doubles ===
Year	Champion	Runner-up	Score
2016	(Belgium) Sander Gillé (Belgium) Joran Vliegen	(Poland) Tomasz Bednarek (Czech Republic) Roman Jebavý	6–2, 7–5
2015	(Netherlands) Wesley Koolhof (Netherlands) Matwé Middelkoop	(Poland) Kamil Majchrzak (France) Stéphane Robert	6–4, 6–2
2014	(Czech Republic) Roman Jebavý (Czech Republic) Jaroslav Pospíšil	(Netherlands) Stephan Fransen (Netherlands) Robin Haase	6–4, 6–2
2013	(Croatia) Marin Draganja (Croatia) Mate Pavic	(Slovenia) Aljaž Bedene (Czech Republic) Jaroslav Pospíšil	7–5, 4–6, [10–6]
2012	(Serbia) Nikola Ćirić (Montenegro) Goran Tošić	(Croatia) Mate Pavić (Croatia) Franko Škugor	7–6^{(7–0)}, 7–5
2011	(Australia) Colin Ebelthite (Czech Republic) Jaroslav Pospíšil	(Belarus) Aliaksandr Bury (Belarus) Andrei Vasilevski	6–3, 6–4
2010	(Slovakia) Karol Beck (Czech Republic) Lukáš Rosol	(Austria) Alexander Peya (Austria) Martin Slanar	4–6, 7–6^{(7–3)}, [10–8]
2009	(Bulgaria) Grigor Dimitrov (Russia) Teymuraz Gabashvili	(Czech Republic) Jan Minář (Czech Republic) Lukáš Rosol	6–4, 2–6, [10–8]
2008	(Czech Republic) David Škoch (Slovakia) Igor Zelenay	(Austria) Daniel Köllerer (Slovakia) Michal Mertiňák	6–3, 6–1
2007	(Slovakia) Filip Polášek (Slovakia) Igor Zelenay	(Argentina) Diego Junqueira (Spain) Rubén Ramírez Hidalgo	6–1, 6–4
