= 2015 Morocco Tennis Tour – Kenitra – Singles =

Kenitra – Singles
- 2015 Morocco Tennis Tour – Kenitra

Final
- Champion: (Spain) Roberto Carballés Baena
- Runner-up: (Spain) Oriol Roca Batalla
- Score: 6–1, 5–1 retired

Events
Singles	Doubles
← 2014 ·	Morocco Tennis Tour – Kenitra	· 2016 →

Daniel Gimeno Traver was the defending champion, but chose not to defend his title.

== Seeds ==
1. (Spain) Daniel Muñoz de la Nava (quarterfinals)
2. (Bosnia and Herzegovina) Damir Džumhur (second round)
3. (Argentina) Facundo Argüello (quarterfinals)
4. (Spain) Roberto Carballés Baena (champion)
5. (Austria) Gerald Melzer (second round)
6. (Belgium) Germain Gigounon (second round)
7. (Italy) Gianluca Naso (second round, retired)
8. (Italy) Matteo Viola (quarterfinals, retired)

== Draw ==
Key

- Q = Qualifier
- WC = Wild card
- LL = Lucky loser
- Alt = Alternate
- ITF = ITF entry
- PR = Protected ranking
- SR = Special ranking
- SE = Special exempt
- JE = Junior exempt
- JR = Junior Accelerator Programme entrant
- CO = College Accelerator Programme entrant
- NG = Next Gen Accelerator Program entrant
- w/o = Walkover
- r = Retired
- d = Defaulted

=== Finals ===
Semifinals
(Germany) Maximilian Marterer	3	2
4	(Spain) Roberto Carballés Baena	6	6
(Spain) Oriol Roca Batalla	4	7	6
(Spain) Javier Martí	6	5	4

Final
4	(Spain) Roberto Carballés Baena	6	5
(Spain) Oriol Roca Batalla	1	1^{r}

=== Top half ===
First round
1	(Spain) D Muñoz de la Nava	6	6
(Kazakhstan) D Popko	3	0
(Spain) G Granollers	6	6
(Spain) J Samper Montaña	4	2
(Morocco) L Ouahab	6^{5}	5
(Germany) M Marterer	7^{7}	7
(Italy) Omar Giacalone	3	3
5	(Austria) G Melzer	6	6
4	(Spain) R Carballés Baena	6	6
(Monaco) B Balleret	4	4
(Slovakia) F Horanský	6	7^{7}
(Austria) M Linzer	2	6^{4}
Q	(Germany) K Krawietz	6	6
(France) G Mina	3	4
Q	(Switzerland) L Margaroli	2	3
8	(Italy) M Viola	6	6

Second round
1	(Spain) D Muñoz de la Nava	7^{8}	6
(Spain) G Granollers	6^{6}	3
(Germany) M Marterer	6	6
5	(Austria) G Melzer	3	4
4	(Spain) R Carballés Baena	6	6
(Slovakia) F Horanský	3	0
Q	(Germany) K Krawietz	6^{2}	4
8	(Italy) M Viola	7^{7}	6

Quarterfinals
1	(Spain) D Muñoz de la Nava	5	4
(Germany) M Marterer	7	6
4	(Spain) R Carballés Baena	5
8	(Italy) M Viola	0^{r}

Semifinals
(Germany) M Marterer	3	2
4	(Spain) R Carballés Baena	6	6

=== Bottom half ===
First round
7	(Italy) G Naso	2	6	0
(Russia) Kirill Dmitriev	6	3	0^{r}
(Serbia) N Milojević	2	4
(Spain) O Roca Batalla	6	6
Q	(Belgium) Y Reuter	6	7
WC	(Morocco) M Jdi	1	5
WC	(Morocco) Y Rachidi	1	3
3	(Argentina) F Argüello	6	6
6	(Belgium) G Gigounon	6	6
Q	(Spain) P Toledo Bagué	4	3
(France) M Chazal	7	7^{7}
(France) S Robert	5	6^{5}
(Spain) J Martí	6	6
WC	(Morocco) A Ahouda	1	2
WC	(Morocco) Khalid Allouch	1	2
2	(Bosnia and Herzegovina) D Džumhur	6	6

Second round
7	(Italy) G Naso	4	1^{r}
(Spain) O Roca Batalla	6	4
Q	(Belgium) Y Reuter	4	3
3	(Argentina) F Argüello	6	6
6	(Belgium) G Gigounon	5	4
(France) M Chazal	7	6
(Spain) J Martí	6	7^{11}
2	(Bosnia and Herzegovina) D Džumhur	2	6^{9}

Quarterfinals
(Spain) O Roca Batalla	6^{4}	6	6
3	(Argentina) F Argüello	7^{7}	0	2
(France) M Chazal	2	3
(Spain) J Martí	6	6

Semifinals
(Spain) O Roca Batalla	4	7	6
(Spain) J Martí	6	5	4
