= 2014 Morocco Tennis Tour – Kenitra – Singles =

Kenitra – Singles
- 2014 Morocco Tennis Tour – Kenitra

Final
- Champion: (Spain) Daniel Gimeno-Traver
- Runner-up: (Spain) Albert Ramos
- Score: 6–3, 6–4

Events
Singles	Doubles
← 2013 ·	Morocco Tennis Tour – Kenitra	· 2015 →

Dominic Thiem was the defending champion, but he did not participate that year.

Daniel Gimeno-Traver won the title, defeating Albert Ramos in the final, 6–3, 6–4.

== Seeds ==
1. (Spain) Albert Ramos (final)
2. (Bosnia and Herzegovina) Damir Džumhur (semifinals)
3. (Spain) Daniel Gimeno-Traver (champion)
4. (Slovenia) Aljaž Bedene (quarterfinals)
5. (Spain) Adrián Menéndez-Maceiras (first round)
6. (Italy) Matteo Viola (first round)
7. (France) Lucas Pouille (quarterfinals)
8. (Spain) Rubén Ramírez Hidalgo (first round)

== Draw ==
=== Key ===
- Q = Qualifier
- WC = Wild card
- LL = Lucky loser
- Alt = Alternate
- SE = Special exempt
- PR = Protected ranking
- ITF = ITF entry
- JE = Junior exempt
- w/o = Walkover
- r = Retired
- d = Defaulted
- SR = Special ranking

=== Finals ===
Semifinals
1	(Spain) Albert Ramos	4	6	6
(Spain) Roberto Carballés Baena	6	4	3
3	(Spain) Daniel Gimeno-Traver	6	6
2	(Bosnia and Herzegovina) Damir Džumhur	3	0

Final
1	(Spain) Albert Ramos	3	4
3	(Spain) Daniel Gimeno-Traver	6	6

=== Top half ===
First round
1	(Spain) A Ramos	6	4
(Serbia) P Krstin	4	0^{r}
(Czech Republic) A Pavlásek	6	3	7^{7}
Q	(Switzerland) S Ehrat	3	6	6^{1}
(Spain) J Samper-Montaña	7^{7}	6
(Spain) E López-Pérez	6^{1}	1
(Switzerland) H Laaksonen	6	3	4
7	(France) L Pouille	4	6	6
4	(Slovenia) A Bedene	6	7
(Egypt) M Safwat	2	5
(Belgium) K Coppejans	7	4	7
(Chile) H Podlipnik-Castillo	5	6	5
(Russia) A Karatsev	3	7	6
(France) M Bourgue	6	5	3
(Spain) R Carballés Baena	6	6^{6}	6
8	(Spain) R Ramírez Hidalgo	3	7^{8}	4

Second round
1	(Spain) A Ramos	6	6
(Czech Republic) A Pavlásek	3	1
(Spain) J Samper-Montaña	6	6^{2}	2
7	(France) L Pouille	3	7^{7}	6
4	(Slovenia) A Bedene	4	6	6
(Belgium) K Coppejans	6	1	2
(Russia) A Karatsev	2	6	4
(Spain) R Carballés Baena	6	2	6

Quarterfinals
1	(Spain) A Ramos	6	1	7^{7}
7	(France) L Pouille	0	6	6^{0}
4	(Slovenia) A Bedene	6^{3}	6	6^{5}
(Spain) R Carballés Baena	7^{7}	2	7^{7}

Semifinals
1	(Spain) A Ramos	4	6	6
(Spain) R Carballés Baena	6	4	3

=== Bottom half ===
First round
5	(Spain) A Menéndez-Maceiras	6^{4}	4
(Italy) S Travaglia	7^{7}	6
Q	(Spain) D Vega Hernández	1	3
WC	(Morocco) Y Idmbarek	6	6
(Spain) I Cervantes	6	6
WC	(Morocco) L Ouahab	4	2
(Belgium) Y Reuter	6^{1}	6^{3}
3	(Spain) D Gimeno-Traver	7^{7}	7^{7}
6	(Italy) M Viola	6^{3}	6^{4}
(Portugal) R Machado	7^{7}	7^{7}
WC	(Morocco) A Ahouda	6	6
WC	(Morocco) Ayoub Chakrouni	1	3
Q	(France) J Obry	6	6
(Spain) G Granollers	3	4
Q	(Russia) A Zaitcev	4	2
2	(Bosnia and Herzegovina) D Džumhur	6	6

Second round
(Italy) S Travaglia	2	7^{7}	6
WC	(Morocco) Y Idmbarek	6	6^{5}	4
(Spain) I Cervantes	4	4
3	(Spain) D Gimeno-Traver	6	6
(Portugal) R Machado	6	6
WC	(Morocco) A Ahouda	1	1
Q	(France) J Obry
2	(Bosnia and Herzegovina) D Džumhur	w/o

Quarterfinals
(Italy) S Travaglia	2	5
3	(Spain) D Gimeno-Traver	6	7
(Portugal) R Machado	6^{4}	1
2	(Bosnia and Herzegovina) D Džumhur	7^{7}	6

Semifinals
3	(Spain) D Gimeno-Traver	6	6
2	(Bosnia and Herzegovina) D Džumhur	3	0
