= 2013 Morocco Tennis Tour – Kenitra – Singles =

Kenitra – Singles
- 2013 Morocco Tennis Tour – Kenitra

Final
- Champion: (Austria) Dominic Thiem
- Runner-up: (Russia) Teymuraz Gabashvili
- Score: 7–6^{(7–4)}, 5–1 ret.

Events
Singles	Doubles
← 2012 ·	Morocco Tennis Tour – Kenitra	· 2014 →

Dominic Thiem became the inaugural champion when Teymuraz Gabashvili retired 7–6^{(7–4)}, 5–1.

== Seeds ==
1. (Russia) Teymuraz Gabashvili (final, retired)
2. (Austria) Dominic Thiem (champion)
3. (Italy) Thomas Fabbiano (first round)
4. (France) David Guez (second round)
5. (France) Lucas Pouille (withdrew)
6. (Germany) Cedrik-Marcel Stebe (quarterfinals)
7. (Slovenia) Blaž Rola (semifinals)
8. (Austria) Gerald Melzer (quarterfinals)

== Draw ==
=== Key ===
- Q = Qualifier
- WC = Wild card
- LL = Lucky loser
- Alt = Alternate
- SE = Special exempt
- PR = Protected ranking
- ITF = ITF entry
- JE = Junior exempt
- w/o = Walkover
- r = Retired
- d = Defaulted
- SR = Special ranking

=== Finals ===
Semifinals
1	(Russia) Teymuraz Gabashvili	6	6
(Spain) Gerard Granollers	1	4
7	(Slovenia) Blaž Rola	4	3
2	(Austria) Dominic Thiem	6	6

Final
1	(Russia) Teymuraz Gabashvili	6^{4}	1^{r}
2	(Austria) Dominic Thiem	7^{7}	5

=== Top half ===
First round
1	(Russia) T Gabashvili	5	6	6
(Belgium) Y Reuter	7	3	3
(Germany) A Beck	6	5	7
Q	(Belgium) K Coppejans	2	7	5
(France) G Burquier	7^{7}	6
(Japan) T Daniel	6^{4}	3
Q	(Italy) R Marcora	2	4
6	(Germany) C-M Stebe	6	6
3	(Italy) T Fabbiano	6^{3}	1
(Spain) G Granollers	7^{7}	6
(Chile) H Podlipnik Castillo	5	1
(Germany) N Langer	7	6
(Spain) G Olaso	7	6
WC	(Morocco) Y Rachidi	5	1
WC	(Morocco) H Khaddari	7	2	7^{7}
LL	(France) A Musialek	5	6	6^{4}

Second round
1	(Russia) T Gabashvili	6	6
(Germany) A Beck	2	3
(France) G Burquier	6	1	2
6	(Germany) C-M Stebe	2	6	6
(Spain) G Granollers	7^{7}	6
(Germany) N Langer	6^{5}	1
(Spain) G Olaso	7	7^{7}
WC	(Morocco) H Khaddari	5	6^{5}

Quarterfinals
1	(Russia) T Gabashvili	6	6
6	(Germany) C-M Stebe	2	3
(Spain) G Granollers	6	6
(Spain) G Olaso	2	1

Semifinals
1	(Russia) T Gabashvili	6	6
(Spain) G Granollers	1	4

=== Bottom half ===
First round
7	(Slovenia) B Rola	7	6
(Germany) G Gigounon	5	0
Q	(United Kingdom) A Ward	5	6	6
WC	(Morocco) M Jdi	7	4	4
Q	(Russia) A Rumyantsev	4	6	6
WC	(Morocco) Y Idmbarek	6	2	0
(Algeria) L Ouahab	3	0
4	(France) D Guez	6	6
8	(Austria) G Melzer	6	2	6
(Italy) G Naso	0	6	4
(Germany) Steven Moneke	3	4
(Belgium) A De Greef	6	6
(Spain) Marc Giner	4	2
PR	(France) Laurent Rochette	6	6
(Spain) J Samper Montaña	7	4	2
2	(Austria) D Thiem	5	6	6

Second round
7	(Slovenia) B Rola	6	3	6
Q	(United Kingdom) A Ward	3	6	3
Q	(Russia) A Rumyantsev	6	6
4	(France) D Guez	1	1
8	(Austria) G Melzer	6	6
(Belgium) A De Greef	3	3
PR	(France) L Rochette	1	4
2	(Austria) D Thiem	6	6

Quarterfinals
7	(Slovenia) B Rola	6	3	6
Q	(Russia) A Rumyantsev	1	6	2
8	(Austria) G Melzer	7^{9}	0	6^{2}
2	(Austria) D Thiem	6^{7}	6	7^{7}

Semifinals
7	(Slovenia) B Rola	4	3
2	(Austria) D Thiem	6	6
