= 2015 Morocco Tennis Tour – Kenitra – Doubles =

Kenitra – Doubles
- 2015 Morocco Tennis Tour – Kenitra

Final
- Champions: (Spain) Gerard Granollers; (Spain) Oriol Roca Batalla
- Runners-up: (Germany) Kevin Krawietz; (Germany) Maximilian Marterer
- Score: 3–6, 7–6^{(7–4)}, [10–8]

Events
Singles	Doubles
← 2014 ·	Morocco Tennis Tour – Kenitra	· 2016 →

Dino Marcan and Antonio Šančić were the defending champions, but decided not to defend their title.

== Seeds ==
1. (United States) James Cerretani / (Austria) Tristan-Samuel Weissborn (semifinals)
2. (Monaco) Romain Arneodo / (Monaco) Benjamin Balleret (quarterfinals)
3. (Italy) Matteo Viola / (Italy) Matteo Volante (semifinals)
4. (Romania) Patrick Grigoriu / (Spain) Sergio Martos Gornés (quarterfinals)

== Draw ==
=== Key ===
- Q = Qualifier
- WC = Wild card
- LL = Lucky loser
- Alt = Alternate
- SE = Special exempt
- PR = Protected ranking
- ITF = ITF entry
- JE = Junior exempt
- w/o = Walkover
- r = Retired
- d = Defaulted
- SR = Special ranking

First round

Quarterfinals

Semifinals

Final

1
- (United States) J Cerretani
- (Austria) T-S Weissborn
6
6

- (Argentina) F Argüello
- (Argentina) T Lipovšek Puches
1
2

1
- (United States) J Cerretani
- (Austria) T-S Weissborn
7^{8}
6

WC
- (Morocco) M Jdi
- (Morocco) Y Rachidi
2
2

- (Austria) G Melzer
- (Netherlands) M Vervoort
6^{6}
2

- (Austria) G Melzer
- (Netherlands) M Vervoort
6
6

1
- (United States) J Cerretani
- (Austria) T-S Weissborn
5
3

4
- (Romania) P Grigoriu
- (Spain) S Martos Gornés
3
7
[10]

- (Germany) K Krawietz
- (Germany) M Marterer
7
6

- (Romania) D Dima
- (Belgium) G Gigounon
6
5
[7]

4
- (Romania) P Grigoriu
- (Spain) S Martos Gornés
3
1

- (Germany) K Krawietz
- (Germany) M Marterer
6
6

- (Germany) K Krawietz
- (Germany) M Marterer
6
6

- (Switzerland) L Margaroli
- (Morocco) L Ouahab
3
3

- (Germany) K Krawietz
- (Germany) M Marterer
6
6^{4}
[8]

- (Russia) Kirill Dmitriev
- (Kazakhstan) D Popko
4
6
[6]

- (Spain) G Granollers
- (Spain) O Roca Batalla
3
7^{7}
[10]

- (Italy) Omar Giacalone
- (Italy) G Naso
6
3
[10]

- (Italy) O Giacalone
- (Italy) G Naso

WC
(Morocco) A Ahouda
(Morocco) Khalid Allouch
4
2

3
(Italy) M Viola
(Italy) M Volante
w/o

3
(Italy) M Viola
(Italy) Matteo Volante
6
6

3
(Italy) M Viola
(Italy) M Volante
2
2

WC
(Morocco) Mohamed Adnaoui
(Morocco) Ayoub Chakrouni
2
3

- (Spain) G Granollers
- (Spain) O Roca Batalla
6
6

- (Spain) G Granollers
- (Spain) O Roca Batalla
6
6

- (Spain) G Granollers
- (Spain) O Roca Batalla
6
3
[13]

- (France) S Robert
- (United States) M Seeberger
4
6
[5]

2
- (Monaco) R Arneodo
- (Monaco) B Balleret
2
6
[11]

2
- (Monaco) R Arneodo
- (Monaco) B Balleret
6
4
[10]
