= 2013 Morocco Tennis Tour – Kenitra – Doubles =

Kenitra – Doubles
- 2013 Morocco Tennis Tour – Kenitra

Final
- Champions: (Spain) Gerard Granollers; (Spain) Jordi Samper Montaña
- Runners-up: (Japan) Taro Daniel (Russia) Alexander Rumyantsev
- Score: 6-4, 6-4

Events
Singles	Doubles
← 2012 ·	Morocco Tennis Tour – Kenitra	· 2014 →

Gerard Granollers and Jordi Samper Montaña defeated Taro Daniel and Alexander Rumyantsev 6–4, 6–4 to win the inaugural event.

== Seeds ==
1. (Uruguay) Ariel Behar / (Spain) Carles Poch Gradin (semifinals)
2. (Austria) Lukas Jastraunig / (Austria) Gerald Melzer (quarterfinals)
3. (Spain) Gerard Granollers / (Spain) Jordi Samper Montaña (champions)
4. (Italy) Thomas Fabbiano / (Spain) Guillermo Olaso (quarterfinals, withdrew)

== Draw ==
=== Key ===
- Q = Qualifier
- WC = Wild card
- LL = Lucky loser
- Alt = Alternate
- SE = Special exempt
- PR = Protected ranking
- ITF = ITF entry
- JE = Junior exempt
- w/o = Walkover
- r = Retired
- d = Defaulted
- SR = Special ranking

=== Draw ===
First round

Quarterfinals

Semifinals

Final

1
- (Uruguay) A Behar
- (Spain) C Poch-Gradin
7
6

WC
(Morocco) Mohamed Adnaoui
(Morocco) Nizar Belmati
6^{4}
5

(Morocco) A Chakrouni
(Morocco) O Erramy
5
1

(Morocco) Ayoub Chakrouni
(Morocco) Omar Erramy
7^{7}
6

1
- (Uruguay) A Behar
- (Spain) C Poch-Gradin
6
2
[6]

4
- (Italy) T Fabbiano
- (Spain) G Olaso
w/o

(Japan) T Daniel
(Russia) A Rumyantsev
4
6
[10]

- (Austria) Marc Rath
- (Austria) D Thiem

4
- (Italy) T Fabbiano
- (Spain) G Olaso

WC
- (Morocco) Y Idmbarek
- (Morocco) M Jdi
2
1

(Japan) T Daniel
(Russia) A Rumyantsev
w/o

(Japan) T Daniel
(Russia) Alexander Rumyantsev
6
6

(Japan) T Daniel
(Russia) A Rumyantsev
4
4

- (Russia) T Gabashvili
- (Romania) C-I Gârd

3
- (Spain) G Granollers
- (Spain) J Samper Montaña
6
6

WC
- (Morocco) H Khaddari
- (Morocco) Y Rachidi
w/o

WC
- (Morocco) H Khaddari
- (Morocco) Y Rachidi
2
2

- (Germany) N Langer
- (Germany) C-M Stebe
0
4

3
- (Spain) G Granollers
- (Spain) J Samper Montaña
6
6

3
- (Spain) G Granollers
- (Spain) J Samper Montaña
6
6

3
- (Spain) G Granollers
- (Spain) J Samper Montaña
6
6

- (Germany) Steven Moneke
- (Slovakia) B Rola
6
6

- (Germany) S Moneke
- (Slovakia) B Rola
2
3

(Chile) H Podlipnik Castillo
(France) Laurent Rochette
3
4

- (Germany) S Moneke
- (Slovakia) B Rola
6
7^{7}

2
- (Austria) Lukas Jastraunig
- (Austria) G Melzer
3
6^{5}
