= 2016 Morocco Tennis Tour – Kenitra – Doubles =

Kenitra – Doubles
- 2016 Morocco Tennis Tour – Kenitra

Final
- Champions: (Germany) Kevin Krawietz; (Germany) Maximilian Marterer
- Runners-up: (Belarus) Uladzimir Ignatik; (Austria) Michael Linzer
- Score: 7–6^{(8–6)}, 4–6, [10–6]

Events
| Singles | Doubles |
| ← 2015 · | Morocco Tennis Tour – Kenitra | · 2017 → |

Gerard Granollers and Oriol Roca Batalla were the defending champions but only Roca Batalla decided to defend his title, partnering Pedro Martínez. Roca Batalla lost in the quarterfinals to Kevin Krawietz and Maximilian Marterer.

Krawietz and Marterer won the title after defeating Uladzimir Ignatik and Michael Linzer 7–6^{(8–6)}, 4–6, [10–6] in the final.

== Seeds ==
1. (Belgium) Sander Gillé / (Belgium) Joran Vliegen (semifinals)
2. (Germany) Daniel Masur / (Netherlands) Mark Vervoort (quarterfinals)
3. (Switzerland) Luca Margaroli / (Egypt) Mohamed Safwat (quarterfinals)
4. (Spain) Pedro Martínez / (Spain) Oriol Roca Batalla (quarterfinals)

== Draw ==
=== Key ===
- Q = Qualifier
- WC = Wild card
- LL = Lucky loser
- Alt = Alternate
- SE = Special exempt
- PR = Protected ranking
- ITF = ITF entry
- JE = Junior exempt
- w/o = Walkover
- r = Retired
- d = Defaulted
- SR = Special ranking

First round

Quarterfinals

Semifinals

Final

1
- (Belgium) S Gillé
- (Belgium) J Vliegen
7^{7}
7^{7}

WC
- (Morocco) A Ahouda
- (Morocco) Y Idmbarek
1
3

(Czech Republic) P Michnev
(Netherlands) L van der Linden
6^{5}
6^{1}

(Czech Republic) Petr Michnev
(Netherlands) Linnert van der Linden
6
6

1
- (Belgium) S Gillé
- (Belgium) J Vliegen
6
3
[8]

3
- (Switzerland) L Margaroli
- (Egypt) M Safwat
6
6

- (Belarus) U Ignatik
- (Austria) M Linzer
3
6
[10]

- (Belgium) A De Greef
- (Belgium) Y Reuter
3
1

3
- (Switzerland) L Margaroli
- (Egypt) M Safwat
5
6
[6]

- (Belarus) U Ignatik
- (Austria) M Linzer
6
6

- (Belarus) U Ignatik
- (Austria) M Linzer
7
3
[10]

WC
- (Morocco) Khalid Allouch
- (Morocco) M Saber
2
1

- (Belarus) U Ignatik
- (Austria) M Linzer
6^{6}
6
[6]

- (Germany) K Krawietz
- (Germany) M Marterer
6
6

- (Germany) K Krawietz
- (Germany) M Marterer
7^{8}
4
[10]

WC
- (Morocco) Nizar Belmati
- (Morocco) M Jdi
1
0

- (Germany) K Krawietz
- (Germany) M Marterer
6
6

- (Argentina) F Coria
- (Argentina) T Lipovšek Puches
3
3

4
- (Spain) P Martínez
- (Spain) O Roca Batalla
0
3

4
- (Spain) P Martínez
- (Spain) O Roca Batalla
6
6

- (Germany) K Krawietz
- (Germany) M Marterer
7^{14}
6

- (Spain) P Toledo Bagué
- (Spain) M Vilella Martínez
6
4
[10]

- (Spain) P Toledo Bagué
- (Spain) M Vilella Martínez
6^{12}
3

- (Morocco) L Ouahab
- (Russia) A Zhurbin
4
6
[7]

- (Spain) P Toledo Bagué
- (Spain) M Vilella Martínez
6
6

2
- (Germany) D Masur
- (Netherlands) M Vervoort
4
4
