= 2014 Morocco Tennis Tour – Kenitra – Doubles =

Kenitra – Doubles
- 2014 Morocco Tennis Tour – Kenitra

Final
- Champions: (Croatia) Dino Marcan (Croatia) Antonio Šančić
- Runners-up: (Spain) Gerard Granollers (Spain) Jordi Samper-Montaña
- Score: 6–1, 7–6^{(7–3)}

Events
Singles	Doubles
← 2013 ·	Morocco Tennis Tour – Kenitra	· 2015 →

Gerard Granollers and Jordi Samper-Montaña were the defending champions, but they lost in the final to Dino Marcan and Antonio Šančić, 1–6, 6–7^{(3–7)}.

== Seeds ==
1. (Italy) Claudio Grassi / (Spain) Enrique López-Pérez (first round)
2. (Spain) Adrián Menéndez-Maceiras / (Netherlands) Matwé Middelkoop (quarterfinals)
3. (United Kingdom) Sean Thornley / (United Kingdom) Darren Walsh (quarterfinals)
4. (Italy) Francesco Borgo / (Italy) Matteo Viola (first round)

== Draw ==
=== Key ===
- Q = Qualifier
- WC = Wild card
- LL = Lucky loser
- Alt = Alternate
- SE = Special exempt
- PR = Protected ranking
- ITF = ITF entry
- JE = Junior exempt
- w/o = Walkover
- r = Retired
- d = Defaulted
- SR = Special ranking

=== Draw ===
First round
1	(Italy) C Grassi (Spain) E López-Pérez	3	2
(Croatia) D Marcan (Croatia) A Šančić	6	6
(Bosnia and Herzegovina) D Džumhur (Czech Republic) A Pavlásek	6	6
(Egypt) K Hossam (Egypt) M Safwat	2	3
3	(United Kingdom) S Thornley (United Kingdom) D Walsh	1	7^{7}	[10]
(Spain) I Cervantes (Netherlands) M Vervoort	6	6^{2}	[7]
WC	(Morocco) Mohamed Adnaoui (Morocco) Ayoub Chakrouni	4	1
WC	(Morocco) Reda Karakhi (Morocco) L Ouahab	6	6
(Italy) A di Mauro (Italy) G Naso
(Chile) H Podlipnik-Castillo (Italy) S Travaglia	w/o
(Russia) A Karatsev (Russia) A Zaitcev	2	6	[10]
4	(Italy) Francesco Borgo (Italy) M Viola	6	2	[8]
(Spain) G Granollers (Spain) J Samper-Montaña	6	6
WC	(Spain) José María Díaz (Spain) A Ramos	2	2
(Switzerland) S Ehrat (Switzerland) H Laaksonen	6	1	[7]
2	(Spain) A Menéndez-Maceiras (Netherlands) M Middelkoop	2	6	[10]

Quarterfinals
(Croatia) D Marcan (Croatia) A Šančić	4	6	[10]
(Bosnia and Herzegovina) D Džumhur (Czech Republic) A Pavlásek	6	0	[2]
3	(United Kingdom) S Thornley (United Kingdom) D Walsh	4	6	[8]
WC	(Morocco) R Karakhi (Morocco) L Ouahab	6	3	[10]
(Chile) H Podlipnik-Castillo (Italy) S Travaglia	3	7^{7}	[8]
(Russia) A Karatsev (Russia) A Zaitcev	6	6^{3}	[10]
(Spain) G Granollers (Spain) J Samper-Montaña	6	1	[12]
2	(Spain) A Menéndez-Maceiras (Netherlands) M Middelkoop	4	6	[10]

Semifinals
(Croatia) D Marcan (Croatia) A Šančić	6	6
WC	(Morocco) R Karakhi (Morocco) L Ouahab	3	2
(Russia) A Karatsev (Russia) A Zaitcev	4	6	[5]
(Spain) G Granollers (Spain) J Samper-Montaña	6	4	[10]

Final
(Croatia) D Marcan (Croatia) A Šančić	6	7^{7}
(Spain) G Granollers (Spain) J Samper-Montaña	1	6^{3}
