= 2016 Morocco Tennis Tour – Kenitra – Singles =

Kenitra – Singles
- 2016 Morocco Tennis Tour – Kenitra

Final
- Champion: (Germany) Maximilian Marterer
- Runner-up: (Egypt) Mohamed Safwat
- Score: 6–2, 6–4

Events
Singles	Doubles
← 2015 ·	Morocco Tennis Tour – Kenitra	· 2017 →

Roberto Carballés Baena was the defending champion but retired in the second round facing Maximilian Marterer.

Marterer won the title after defeating Mohamed Safwat 6–2, 6–4 in the final.

== Seeds ==
1. (Spain) Roberto Carballés Baena (second round, retired)
2. (Spain) Daniel Gimeno Traver (first round)
3. (Belgium) Arthur De Greef (second round)
4. (Spain) Rubén Ramírez Hidalgo (quarterfinals)
5. (Canada) Steven Diez (quarterfinals)
6. (Portugal) Pedro Sousa (second round)
7. (Egypt) Mohamed Safwat (final)
8. (Belgium) Yannik Reuter (first round)

== Draw ==
=== Key ===
- Q = Qualifier
- WC = Wild card
- LL = Lucky loser
- Alt = Alternate
- SE = Special exempt
- PR = Protected ranking
- ITF = ITF entry
- JE = Junior exempt
- w/o = Walkover
- r = Retired
- d = Defaulted
- SR = Special ranking

=== Finals ===
Semifinals
(Germany) Maximilian Marterer	6	6
WC	(Spain) Pablo Andújar	1	1
(Germany) Jeremy Jahn	1	2
7	(Egypt) Mohamed Safwat	6	6

Final
(Germany) Maximilian Marterer	6	6
7	(Egypt) Mohamed Safwat	2	4

=== Top half ===
First round
1	(Spain) R Carballés Baena	6	2
(Belgium) Clément Geens	1	0^{r}
Q	(Spain) P Toledo Bagué	6	5	2
(Germany) M Marterer	1	7	6
(Belgium) G Gigounon	6	6
(Czech Republic) Petr Michnev	4	2
(Spain) P Martínez	5	2
5	(Canada) S Diez	7	6
3	(Belgium) A De Greef	6	6
Q	(Germany) K Krawietz	3	1
WC	(Spain) P Andújar	6	6
WC	(Morocco) Y Idmbarek	1	0
(Belarus) U Ignatik	7	7
(Spain) M Vilella Martínez	5	5
WC	(Morocco) A Ahouda	5	4
6	(Portugal) P Sousa	7	6

Second round
1	(Spain) R Carballés Baena	6	5	0^{r}
(Germany) M Marterer	3	7	4
(Belgium) G Gigounon	3	6^{4}
5	(Canada) S Diez	6	7^{7}
3	(Belgium) A De Greef	4	3
WC	(Spain) P Andújar	6	6
(Belarus) U Ignatik	6	6
6	(Portugal) P Sousa	2	4

Quarterfinals
(Germany) M Marterer	6	6
5	(Canada) S Diez	1	2
WC	(Spain) P Andújar	2	7^{7}	6
(Belarus) U Ignatik	6	6^{5}	4

Semifinals
(Germany) M Marterer	6	6
WC	(Spain) P Andújar	1	1

=== Bottom half ===
First round
8	(Belgium) Y Reuter	4	7^{10}	3
(Germany) Jeremy Jahn	6	6^{8}	6
WC	(Morocco) M Jdi	4	2
(Argentina) T Lipovšek Puches	6	6
Q	(Morocco) L Ouahab	1	4
(Austria) M Linzer	6	6
LL	(Belgium) Omar Salman	2	2
4	(Spain) R Ramírez Hidalgo	6	6
7	(Egypt) M Safwat	7	7^{8}
(France) M Chazal	5	6^{6}
(Spain) O Roca Batalla	6	6
Q	(Russia) A Zhurbin	2	3
(Argentina) F Coria	6	6
(Germany) N Langer	1	4
(Germany) D Masur	6	6
2	(Spain) D Gimeno Traver	3	4

Second round
(Germany) J Jahn	6	6
(Argentina) T Lipovšek Puches	0	3
(Austria) M Linzer	5	3
4	(Spain) R Ramírez Hidalgo	7	6
7	(Egypt) M Safwat	6	1
(Spain) O Roca Batalla	0	0^{r}
(Argentina) F Coria	3	4
(Germany) D Masur	6	6

Quarterfinals
(Germany) J Jahn	6	6
4	(Spain) R Ramírez Hidalgo	2	4
7	(Egypt) M Safwat	6	7
(Germany) D Masur	4	5

Semifinals
(Germany) J Jahn	1	2
7	(Egypt) M Safwat	6	6
