= 2015 Grand Prix Hassan II – Singles =

Singles
- 2015 Grand Prix Hassan II

Final
- Champion: (Slovakia) Martin Kližan
- Runner-up: (Spain) Daniel Gimeno Traver
- Score: 6–2, 6–2

Events
Singles	Doubles
← 2014 ·	Grand Prix Hassan II	· 2016 →

Guillermo García López was the defending champion, but lost to Lamine Ouahab in the second round.
Martin Kližan won the title, defeating Daniel Gimeno Traver in the final, 6–2, 6–2.

== Seeds ==
The top four seeds receive a bye into the second round.

1. (Spain) Guillermo García López (second round)
2. (Slovakia) Martin Kližan (champion)
3. (Czech Republic) Jiří Veselý (semifinals)
4. (Spain) Marcel Granollers (second round, retired due to right leg injury)
5. (Spain) Pablo Carreño Busta (first round)
6. (Austria) Andreas Haider-Maurer (quarterfinals)
7. (Kazakhstan) Mikhail Kukushkin (second round, retired)
8. (Argentina) Diego Schwartzman (first round)

== Draw ==
Key

- Q = Qualifier
- WC = Wild card
- LL = Lucky loser
- Alt = Alternate
- ITF = ITF entry
- PR = Protected ranking
- SR = Special ranking
- SE = Special exempt
- JE = Junior exempt
- JR = Junior Accelerator Programme entrant
- CO = College Accelerator Programme entrant
- NG = Next Gen Accelerator Program entrant
- w/o = Walkover
- r = Retired
- d = Defaulted

=== Finals ===
Semifinals
(Spain) Daniel Gimeno Traver	6^{3}	6	6
3	(Czech Republic) Jiří Veselý	7^{7}	4	4
(Bosnia and Herzegovina) Damir Džumhur	6	4	0
2	(Slovakia) Martin Kližan	4	6	6

Final
(Spain) Daniel Gimeno Traver	2	2
2	(Slovakia) Martin Kližan	6	6

=== Top half ===
First round
WC	(Morocco) L Ouahab	6	6
(Netherlands) R Haase	2	4
(Spain) D Gimeno Traver	6	6
(Tunisia) M Jaziri	4	3
(Spain) A Ramos Viñolas	1	6	3
7	(Kazakhstan) M Kukushkin	6	2	6
WC	(Morocco) Y Idmbarek	3	1
(Russia) M Youzhny	6	6
(Argentina) M González	3	6	3
Q	(United Kingdom) A Bedene	6	3	6
Q	(Belgium) A De Greef	4	7	6
8	(Argentina) D Schwartzman	6	5	4

Second round
1	(Spain) G García López	3	3
WC	(Morocco) L Ouahab	6	6
(Spain) D Gimeno Traver	6	4
7	(Kazakhstan) M Kukushkin	1	1^{r}
3	(Czech Republic) J Veselý	7^{9}	6
(Russia) M Youzhny	6^{7}	3
Q	(United Kingdom) A Bedene	6	6
Q	(Belgium) A De Greef	2	3

Quarterfinals
WC	(Morocco) L Ouahab	4	3
(Spain) D Gimeno Traver	6	6
3	(Czech Republic) J Veselý	6	6
Q	(United Kingdom) A Bedene	1	4

Semifinals
(Spain) D Gimeno Traver	6^{3}	6	6
3	(Czech Republic) J Veselý	7^{7}	4	4

=== Bottom half ===
First round
6	(Austria) A Haider-Maurer	6	6^{0}	7^{7}
(Germany) J-L Struff	2	7^{7}	6^{5}
(Germany) T Kamke	3	4
(Spain) P Andújar	6	6
(Bosnia and Herzegovina) D Džumhur	6	7^{7}
Q	(France) P-H Mathieu	2	6^{2}
5	(Spain) P Carreño Busta	6	6^{8}	4
(Argentina) C Berlocq	4	7^{10}	6
WC	(Spain) N Almagro	6	6
Q	(Japan) T Daniel	4	1
(Germany) D Brown	6	6
(Russia) A Kuznetsov	2	4

Second round
6	(Austria) A Haider-Maurer	7	6
(Spain) P Andújar	5	3
(Bosnia and Herzegovina) D Džumhur	3
4	(Spain) M Granollers	0^{r}
(Argentina) C Berlocq	5	5
WC	(Spain) N Almagro	7	7
(Germany) D Brown	4	6	6^{5}
2	(Slovakia) M Kližan	6	4	7^{7}

Quarterfinals
6	(Austria) A Haider-Maurer	3	3
(Bosnia and Herzegovina) D Džumhur	6	6
WC	(Spain) N Almagro	4	6^{3}
2	(Slovakia) M Kližan	6	7^{7}

Semifinals
(Bosnia and Herzegovina) D Džumhur	6	4	0
2	(Slovakia) M Kližan	4	6	6

== Qualifying ==
=== Seeds ===
1. (United Kingdom) Aljaž Bedene (qualified)
2. (France) Paul-Henri Mathieu (qualified)
3. (Belgium) Kimmer Coppejans (second round)
4. (Japan) Taro Daniel (qualified)
5. (Belgium) Arthur De Greef (qualified)
6. (France) Mathias Bourgue (qualifying competition)
7. (Argentina) Pedro Cachin (qualifying competition)
8. (Spain) Íñigo Cervantes (second round)

=== Qualifiers ===
1. (United Kingdom) Aljaž Bedene
2. (France) Paul-Henri Mathieu
3. (Belgium) Arthur De Greef
4. (Japan) Taro Daniel

=== Qualifying draw ===
==== First qualifier ====
First round
1	(United Kingdom) Aljaž Bedene	6	6
(France) Maxime Chazal	3	2
(Austria) Michael Linzer	7	6
(France) Maxime Teixeira	5	4
(Portugal) João Domingues	6	6
WC	(Morocco) Taha Tifnouti	0	1
(France) Florent Diep	1	4
7	(Argentina) Pedro Cachin	6	6

Second round
1	(United Kingdom) Aljaž Bedene	6	6
(Austria) Michael Linzer	2	0
(Portugal) João Domingues	5	6^{8}
7	(Argentina) Pedro Cachin	7	7^{10}

Qualifying competition
1	(United Kingdom) Aljaž Bedene	6	6
7	(Argentina) Pedro Cachin	2	2

==== Second qualifier ====
First round
2	(France) Paul-Henri Mathieu	6	6
(Russia) Philipp Davydenko	2	1
(Portugal) Frederico Gil	3	0
(Germany) Jean-Marc Werner	6	6
(Egypt) Mohamed Safwat	5	0
(France) Stéphane Robert	7	6
Alt	(Ukraine) Alexandr Kushakov	3	1
8	(Spain) Íñigo Cervantes	6	6

Second round
2	(France) Paul-Henri Mathieu	7	6
(Germany) Jean-Marc Werner	5	1
(France) Stéphane Robert	6	6^{3}	7^{7}
8	(Spain) Íñigo Cervantes	4	7^{7}	6^{4}

Qualifying competition
2	(France) Paul-Henri Mathieu	7^{7}	5	6
(France) Stéphane Robert	6^{5}	7	4

==== Third qualifier ====
First round
3	(Belgium) Kimmer Coppejans	6^{5}	7^{7}	6
(Germany) Daniel Brands	7^{7}	6^{3}	4
(Spain) Gerard Granollers	3	6^{3}
(Italy) Lorenzo Giustino	6	7^{7}
(Russia) Alexey Vatutin	6	7
(Germany) Maximilian Marterer	4	5
WC	(Morocco) Mehdi Jdi	0	0
5	(Belgium) Arthur De Greef	6	6

Second round
3	(Belgium) Kimmer Coppejans	4	5
(Italy) Lorenzo Giustino	6	7
(Russia) Alexey Vatutin	3	2
5	(Belgium) Arthur De Greef	6	6

Qualifying competition
(Italy) Lorenzo Giustino	3	7^{7}	5
5	(Belgium) Arthur De Greef	6	6^{3}	7

==== Fourth qualifier ====
First round
4	(Japan) Taro Daniel	6	6
WC	(Morocco) Mohamed Adnaoui	0	2
(Portugal) Frederico Ferreira Silva	4	3
(France) Jonathan Eysseric	6	6
WC	(Morocco) Younès Rachidi	2	0
(Finland) Micke Kontinen	6	6
(France) Maxime Hamou	0	7	5
6	(France) Mathias Bourgue	6	5	7

Second round
4	(Japan) Taro Daniel	6	6
(France) Jonathan Eysseric	3	3
(Finland) Micke Kontinen	4	2
6	(France) Mathias Bourgue	6	6

Qualifying competition
4	(Japan) Taro Daniel	7^{7}	6
6	(France) Mathias Bourgue	6^{4}	2
