= 2023 Good to Great Challenger =

- Date: 13–19 November
- Edition: 1st
- Surface: Hard
- Location: Danderyd, Sweden
- Venue: Good to Great Tennis Academy

Champions

Singles
- (Germany) Maximilian Marterer

Doubles
- (United Kingdom) Julian Cash / (Netherlands) Bart Stevens
Good to Great Challenger	· 2024 →

The 2023 Good to Great Challenger was a professional tennis tournament played on hardcourts. It was the 1st edition of the tournament which was part of the 2023 ATP Challenger Tour. It took place in Danderyd, Sweden between 13 and 19 November 2023.

== Singles main-draw entrants ==
=== Seeds ===
Country	Player	Rank^{1}	Seed
FRA	Hugo Gaston	83	1
GER	Maximilian Marterer	97	2
ITA	Flavio Cobolli	100	3
BEL	David Goffin	104	4
SRB	Hamad Medjedovic	107	5
USA	Maxime Cressy	125	6
MDA	Radu Albot	130	7
USA	Brandon Nakashima	139	8

- ^{1} Rankings are as of 6 November 2023.

=== Other entrants ===
The following players received wildcards into the singles main draw:

- (Sweden) Leo Borg
- (Sweden) Max Dahlin
- (Sweden) Karl Friberg

The following player received entry into the singles main draw as an alternate:

- (Ukraine) Oleksii Krutykh

The following players received entry from the qualifying draw:

- (Belgium) Alexander Blockx
- (Switzerland) Mika Brunold
- Alibek Kachmazov
- (Denmark) Elmer Møller
- (Germany) Marvin Möller
- (Austria) Maximilian Neuchrist

== Champions ==
=== Singles ===
- (Germany) Maximilian Marterer def. (United States) Brandon Nakashima 2–6, 6–4, 6–3.

=== Doubles ===
- (United Kingdom) Julian Cash / (Netherlands) Bart Stevens def. (India) Jeevan Nedunchezhiyan / (India) Vijay Sundar Prashanth 6–7^{(7–9)}, 6–4, [10–7].
