= 2016 Morocco Tennis Tour – Kenitra =

- Date: 19–24 September
- Edition: 4th
- Surface: Clay
- Location: Kenitra, Morocco

Champions

Singles
- (Germany) Maximilian Marterer

Doubles
- (Germany) Kevin Krawietz / (Germany) Maximilian Marterer
- Morocco Tennis Tour – Kenitra

The 2016 Morocco Tennis Tour – Kenitra was a professional tennis tournament played on clay courts. It was the 4th edition of the tournament which was part of the 2016 ATP Challenger Tour. It took place in Kenitra, Morocco between 19 and 24 September.

== Singles main-draw entrants ==
=== Seeds ===
Country	Player	Rank^{1}	Seed
ESP	Roberto Carballés Baena	107	1
ESP	Daniel Gimeno Traver	120	2
BEL	Arthur De Greef	139	3
ESP	Rubén Ramírez Hidalgo	148	4
CAN	Steven Diez	162	5
POR	Pedro Sousa	208	6
EGY	Mohamed Safwat	221	7
BEL	Yannik Reuter	240	8

- ^{1} Rankings are as of September 12, 2016.

=== Other entrants ===
The following players received wildcards into the singles main draw:

- (Morocco) Amine Ahouda
- (Morocco) Yassine Idmbarek
- (Morocco) Mehdi Jdi
- (Spain) Pablo Andújar

The following players received entry from the qualifying draw:

- (Germany) Kevin Krawietz
- (Morocco) Lamine Ouahab
- (Russia) Alexander Zhurbin
- (Spain) Pol Toledo Bagué

The following player received entry as a lucky loser:

- (Belgium) Omar Salman

== Champions ==
=== Singles ===
- (Germany) Maximilian Marterer def. (Egypt) Mohamed Safwat, 6–2, 6–4.

=== Doubles ===
- (Germany) Kevin Krawietz / (Germany) Maximilian Marterer def. (Belarus) Uladzimir Ignatik / (Austria) , Michael Linzer 7–6^{(8–6)}, 4–6, [10–6].
