= 2023 Good to Great Challenger – Singles =

Singles
- 2023 Good to Great Challenger

Final
- Champion: (Germany) Maximilian Marterer
- Runner-up: (United States) Brandon Nakashima
- Score: 2–6, 6–4, 6–3

Events
Singles	Doubles
Good to Great Challenger	· 2024 →

This was the first edition of the tournament.

Maximilian Marterer won the title after defeating Brandon Nakashima 2–6, 6–4, 6–3 in the final.

== Seeds ==
1. (France) Hugo Gaston (first round)
2. (Germany) Maximilian Marterer (champion)
3. (Italy) Flavio Cobolli (semifinals)
4. (Belgium) David Goffin (quarterfinals)
5. (Serbia) Hamad Medjedovic (second round)
6. (United States) Maxime Cressy (quarterfinals)
7. (Moldova) Radu Albot (quarterfinals)
8. (United States) Brandon Nakashima (final)

== Draw ==
=== Key ===
- Q = Qualifier
- WC = Wild card
- LL = Lucky loser
- Alt = Alternate
- SE = Special exempt
- PR = Protected ranking
- ITF = ITF entry
- JE = Junior exempt
- w/o = Walkover
- r = Retired
- d = Defaulted
- SR = Special ranking

=== Finals ===
Semifinals
Q	(Belgium) Alexander Blockx	1	2
8	(United States) Brandon Nakashima	6	6
3	(Italy) Flavio Cobolli	2	0
2	(Germany) Maximilian Marterer	6	6

Final
8	(United States) Brandon Nakashima	6	4	3
2	(Germany) Maximilian Marterer	2	6	6

=== Top half ===
First round
1	(France) H Gaston	6	4	4
(France) C Moutet	2	6	6
Q	(Belgium) A Blockx	3	6	7^{7}
Q	(Austria) M Neuchrist	6	1	6^{3}
(Czech Republic) J Menšík	6	7^{7}
WC	(Sweden) M Dahlin	2	6^{3}
(Italy) S Travaglia	4	3
5	(Serbia) H Medjedovic	6	6
4	(Belgium) D Goffin	6	6
Q	(Germany) M Möller	3	2
(Switzerland) L Riedi	6^{2}	6	4
Q	A Kachmazov	7^{7}	2	6
(Kazakhstan) D Yevseyev	6	6
WC	(Sweden) K Friberg	2	3
(United Kingdom) J Choinski	4	2
8	(United States) B Nakashima	6	6

Second round
(France) C Moutet	6^{6}	1
Q	(Belgium) A Blockx	7^{8}	6
(Czech Republic) J Menšík	4	7^{7}	7^{10}
5	(Serbia) H Medjedovic	6	6^{2}	6^{8}
4	(Belgium) D Goffin	7	7
Q	A Kachmazov	5	5
(Kazakhstan) D Yevseyev	4	2
8	(United States) B Nakashima	6	6

Quarterfinals
Q	(Belgium) A Blockx	6	6
(Czech Republic) J Menšík	3	0
4	(Belgium) D Goffin	2	6^{2}
8	(United States) B Nakashima	6	7^{7}

Semifinals
Q	(Belgium) A Blockx	1	2
8	(United States) B Nakashima	6	6

=== Bottom half ===
First round
7	(Moldova) R Albot	4	6	6
(Italy) F Passaro	6	3	4
(Kazakhstan) M Kukushkin	2	1
Alt	(Ukraine) O Krutykh	6	6
WC	(Sweden) L Borg	6	4	0
(Belgium) G Onclin	2	6	6
(Belgium) GA Bailly	4	1
3	(Italy) F Cobolli	6	6
6	(United States) M Cressy	6	7^{7}
(Belgium) J De Loore	3	6^{1}
Q	(Denmark) E Møller	4	1
(Bosnia and Herzegovina) D Džumhur	6	6
(United Kingdom) A Fery	6	2	6
Q	(Switzerland) M Brunold	4	6	2
(Germany) O Otte	3	0
2	(Germany) M Marterer	6	6

Second round
7	(Moldova) R Albot	6	6
Alt	(Ukraine) O Krutykh	4	2
(Belgium) G Onclin
3	(Italy) F Cobolli	w/o
6	(United States) M Cressy	6	6^{5}	7
(Bosnia and Herzegovina) D Džumhur	3	7^{7}	5
(United Kingdom) A Fery	6^{5}	1
2	(Germany) M Marterer	7^{7}	6

Quarterfinals
7	(Moldova) R Albot	4	6^{5}
3	(Italy) F Cobolli	6	7^{7}
6	(United States) M Cressy	4	6	1
2	(Germany) M Marterer	6	4	6

Semifinals
3	(Italy) F Cobolli	2	0
2	(Germany) M Marterer	6	6
