= 2015 Grand Prix Hassan II – Doubles =

Doubles
- 2015 Grand Prix Hassan II

Final
- Champions: (Australia) Rameez Junaid (Canada) Adil Shamasdin
- Runners-up: (India) Rohan Bopanna (Romania) Florin Mergea
- Score: 3–6, 6–2, [10–7]

Events
Singles	Doubles
← 2014 ·	Grand Prix Hassan II	· 2016 →

Jean-Julien Rojer and Horia Tecău were the defending champions, but chose not to participate this year.
Rameez Junaid and Adil Shamasdin won the title, defeating Rohan Bopanna and Florin Mergea in the final, 3–6, 6–2, [10–7].

== Seeds ==
1. (India) Rohan Bopanna / (Romania) Florin Mergea (final)
2. (Germany) Andre Begemann / (Austria) Julian Knowle (first round)
3. (Argentina) Máximo González / (Netherlands) Robin Haase (quarterfinals)
4. (United States) Nicholas Monroe / (New Zealand) Artem Sitak (first round)

== Draw ==
=== Key ===
- Q = Qualifier
- WC = Wild card
- LL = Lucky loser
- Alt = Alternate
- SE = Special exempt
- PR = Protected ranking
- ITF = ITF entry
- JE = Junior exempt
- w/o = Walkover
- r = Retired
- d = Defaulted
- SR = Special ranking

=== Draw ===
First round
1	(India) R Bopanna (Romania) F Mergea	6^{3}	6	[10]
(Spain) P Carreño Busta (Spain) D Marrero	7^{7}	2	[6]
WC	(Morocco) M Jdi (Belarus) M Mirnyi	2	4
(Spain) N Almagro (Spain) G García-López	6	6
4	(United States) N Monroe (New Zealand) A Sitak	6^{3}	1
(Argentina) C Berlocq (Argentina) D Schwartzman	7^{7}	6
(Slovakia) M Kližan (Austria) P Oswald	6^{5}	1
(Spain) P Andújar (Austria) O Marach	7^{7}	6
(Austria) A Haider-Maurer (Germany) D Meffert	2	4
(Australia) R Junaid (Canada) A Shamasdin	6	6
(Czech Republic) F Čermák (Czech Republic) J Veselý	7^{7}	3	[3]
3	(Argentina) M González (Netherlands) R Haase	6^{5}	6	[10]
(Germany) M Emmrich (Sweden) A Siljeström	4	7^{7}	[5]
(Germany) D Brown (Germany) J-L Struff	6	6^{3}	[10]
WC	(Morocco) L Ouahab (Morocco) Y Rachidi	1	6	[12]
2	(Germany) A Begemann (Austria) J Knowle	6	3	[10]

Quarterfinals
1	(India) R Bopanna (Romania) F Mergea	4	7^{7}	[10]
(Spain) N Almagro (Spain) G García-López	6	6^{4}	[4]
(Argentina) C Berlocq (Argentina) D Schwartzman	4	3
(Spain) P Andújar (Austria) O Marach	6	6
(Australia) R Junaid (Canada) A Shamasdin	7	6^{5}	[10]
3	(Argentina) M González (Netherlands) R Haase	5	7^{7}	[4]
(Germany) D Brown (Germany) J-L Struff	6^{5}	6	[1]
WC	(Morocco) L Ouahab (Morocco) Y Rachidi	7^{7}	4	[10]

Semifinals
1	(India) R Bopanna (Romania) F Mergea	5	6	[10]
(Spain) P Andújar (Austria) O Marach	7	3	[8]
(Australia) R Junaid (Canada) A Shamasdin	6	7
WC	(Morocco) L Ouahab (Morocco) Y Rachidi	1	5

Final
1	(India) R Bopanna (Romania) F Mergea	6	2	[7]
(Australia) R Junaid (Canada) A Shamasdin	3	6	[10]
