= 2013 Morocco Tennis Tour – Kenitra =

- Date: 16–22 September
- Edition: 1st
- Surface: Clay
- Location: Kenitra, Morocco

Champions

Singles
- (Austria) Dominic Thiem

Doubles
- (Spain) Gerard Granollers / (Spain) Jordi Samper-Montana
- Morocco Tennis Tour – Kenitra

The 2013 Morocco Tennis Tour – Kenitra was a professional tennis tournament played on clay courts. It was the 1st edition of the tournament which was part of the 2013 ATP Challenger Tour. It took place in Kenitra, Morocco between 16 and 22 September.

== Singles main-draw entrants ==
=== Seeds ===
Country	Player	Rank^{1}	Seed
RUS	Teymuraz Gabashvili	126	1
AUT	Dominic Thiem	166	2
ITA	Thomas Fabbiano	167	3
FRA	David Guez	170	4
~~FRA~~	~~Lucas Pouille~~	~~202~~	~~5~~
GER	Cedrik-Marcel Stebe	206	6
SLO	Blaž Rola	208	7
AUT	Gerald Melzer	211	8

- ^{1} Rankings are as of September 9, 2013.

=== Other entrants ===
The following players received wildcards into the singles main draw:

- (Morocco) Yassine Idmbarek
- (United States) Mehdi Jdi
- (Morocco) Hicham Khaddari
- (Morocco) Younès Rachidi

The following players used Protected Entry to gain entry into the main draw:

- (France) Laurent Rochette

The following players received entry from the qualifying draw:

- (Belgium) Kimmer Coppejans
- (Italy) Roberto Marcora
- (Russia) Alexander Rumyantsev
- (United Kingdom) Alexander Ward

The following players received into the singles main draw as a lucky loser:

- (France) Alexis Musialek

== Champions ==
=== Singles ===
- (Austria) Dominic Thiem def. (Russia) Teymuraz Gabashvili 7–6^{(7–4)}, 5–1 ret.

=== Doubles ===
- (Spain) Gerard Granollers / (Spain) Jordi Samper-Montana def. (Japan) Taro Daniel / (Russia) Alexander Rumyantsev 6–4, 6–4
