= 2023 Good to Great Challenger – Doubles =

Doubles
- 2023 Good to Great Challenger

Final
- Champions: (United Kingdom) Julian Cash (Netherlands) Bart Stevens
- Runners-up: (India) Jeevan Nedunchezhiyan (India) Vijay Sundar Prashanth
- Score: 6–7^{(7–9)}, 6–4, [10–7]

Events
Singles	Doubles
Good to Great Challenger	· 2024 →

This was the first edition of the tournament.

Julian Cash and Bart Stevens won the title after defeating Jeevan Nedunchezhiyan and Vijay Sundar Prashanth 6–7^{(7–9)}, 6–4, [10–7] in the final.

== Seeds ==
1. (United Kingdom) Julian Cash / (Netherlands) Bart Stevens (champions)
2. (India) Jeevan Nedunchezhiyan / (India) Vijay Sundar Prashanth (final)
3. (Finland) Patrik Niklas-Salminen / (Czech Republic) Petr Nouza (semifinals)
4. (United States) Vasil Kirkov / (Poland) Szymon Walków (first round, withdrew)

== Draw ==
=== Key ===
- Q = Qualifier
- WC = Wild card
- LL = Lucky loser
- Alt = Alternate
- SE = Special exempt
- PR = Protected ranking
- ITF = ITF entry
- JE = Junior exempt
- w/o = Walkover
- r = Retired
- d = Defaulted
- SR = Special ranking

First round
WC	(Sweden) L Borg (Sweden) M Dahlin	3	4
(India) S Balaji (Germany) A Begemann	6	6
(Bulgaria) R Shandarov (Bulgaria) V Shandarov	2	1
(Israel) D Cukierman (United Kingdom) J Paris	6	6
(Denmark) J Ingildsen (Finland) E Vasa	6	7
(Italy) Elio José Ribeiro Lago (Israel) R Stepanov	4	5
(Egypt) M Safwat (Greece) S Sakellaridis	w/o
4	(United States) V Kirkov (Poland) S Walków
(Austria) M Neuchrist (Kazakhstan) D Yevseyev	7	6
WC	(Sweden) Henrik Bladelius (Sweden) K Friberg	5	1

Quarterfinals
1	(United Kingdom) J Cash (Netherlands) B Stevens	6	7^{7}
(India) S Balaji (Germany) A Begemann	1	6^{5}
3	(Finland) P Niklas-Salminen (Czech Republic) P Nouza	7	6
(Israel) D Cukierman (United Kingdom) J Paris	5	4
(Denmark) J Ingildsen (Finland) E Vasa	6	6^{4}	[10]
(Egypt) M Safwat (Greece) S Sakellaridis	2	7^{7}	[4]
(Austria) M Neuchrist (Kazakhstan) D Yevseyev	3	4
2	(India) J Nedunchezhiyan (India) VS Prashanth	6	6

Semifinals
1	(United Kingdom) J Cash (Netherlands) B Stevens	6	6
3	(Finland) P Niklas-Salminen (Czech Republic) P Nouza	4	3
(Denmark) J Ingildsen (Finland) E Vasa	4	6^{5}
2	(India) J Nedunchezhiyan (India) VS Prashanth	6	7^{7}

Final
1	(United Kingdom) J Cash (Netherlands) B Stevens	6^{7}	6	[10]
2	(India) J Nedunchezhiyan (India) VS Prashanth	7^{9}	4	[7]
