= 2015 Grand Prix Hassan II =

- Date: 6–12 April
- Edition: 31st
- Draw: 28S / 16D
- Prize money: €439,405
- Surface: Clay
- Location: Casablanca, Morocco

Champions

Singles
- (Slovakia) Martin Kližan

Doubles
- (Australia) Rameez Junaid / (Canada) Adil Shamasdin
- Grand Prix Hassan II

The 2015 Grand Prix Hassan II was a professional tennis tournament played on clay courts. It was the 31st edition of the tournament and part of the 2015 ATP World Tour. It took place in Casablanca, Morocco between 6 and 12 April 2015.

== Singles main-draw entrants ==
=== Seeds ===
Country	Player	Rank^{1}	Seed
ESP	Guillermo García López	25	1
SVK	Martin Kližan	41	2
CZE	Jiří Veselý	48	3
ESP	Marcel Granollers	50	4
ESP	Pablo Carreño Busta	54	5
AUT	Andreas Haider-Maurer	56	6
KAZ	Mikhail Kukushkin	57	7
ARG	Diego Schwartzman	61	8

- ^{1} Rankings are as of March 23, 2015.

=== Other entrants ===
The following players received wildcards into the singles main draw:

- (Spain) Nicolás Almagro
- (Morocco) Yassine Idmbarek
- (Morocco) Lamine Ouahab

The following players received entry from the qualifying draw:

- (United Kingdom) Aljaž Bedene
- (Japan) Taro Daniel
- (Belgium) Arthur De Greef
- (France) Paul-Henri Mathieu

=== Withdrawals ===
Before the tournament

- (Croatia) Ivo Karlović →replaced by Máximo González
- (France) Adrian Mannarino →replaced by Tobias Kamke
- (Portugal) João Sousa →replaced by Robin Haase
- (Austria) Dominic Thiem →replaced by Dustin Brown

=== Retirements ===
- (Spain) Marcel Granollers
- (Kazakhstan) Mikhail Kukushkin

== Doubles main-draw entrants ==
=== Seeds ===
Country	Player	Country	Player	Rank^{1}	Seed
IND	Rohan Bopanna	ROU	Florin Mergea	44	1
GER	Andre Begemann	AUT	Julian Knowle	85	2
ARG	Máximo González	NED	Robin Haase	104	3
USA	Nicholas Monroe	NZL	Artem Sitak	117	4

- Rankings are as of March 23, 2015.

=== Other entrants ===
The following pairs received wildcards into the doubles main draw:

- (Morocco) Mehdi Jdi / (Belarus) Max Mirnyi
- (Morocco) Lamine Ouahab / (Morocco) Younès Rachidi

== Finals ==
=== Singles ===
- (Slovakia) Martin Kližan defeated (Spain) Daniel Gimeno Traver, 6–2, 6–2

=== Doubles ===
- (Australia) Rameez Junaid / (Canada) Adil Shamasdin defeated (India) Rohan Bopanna / (Romania) Florin Mergea, 3–6, 6–2, [10–7]
