= 2014 Morocco Tennis Tour – Kenitra =

- Date: 22–27 September
- Edition: 2nd
- Surface: Clay
- Location: Kenitra, Morocco

Champions

Singles
- (Spain) Daniel Gimeno Traver

Doubles
- (Croatia) Dino Marcan / (Croatia) Antonio Šančić
- Morocco Tennis Tour – Kenitra

The 2014 Morocco Tennis Tour – Kenitra was a professional tennis tournament played on clay courts. It was the 2nd edition of the tournament which was part of the 2014 ATP Challenger Tour. It took place in Kenitra, Morocco between 22 and 27 September.

== Singles main-draw entrants ==
=== Seeds ===
Country	Player	Rank^{1}	Seed
ESP	Albert Ramos	71	1
BIH	Damir Džumhur	115	2
ESP	Daniel Gimeno Traver	135	3
SLO	Aljaž Bedene	144	4
ESP	Adrián Menéndez Maceiras	160	5
ITA	Matteo Viola	182	6
FRA	Lucas Pouille	199	7
ESP	Rubén Ramírez Hidalgo	213	8

- ^{1} Rankings are as of September 15, 2014.

=== Other entrants ===
The following players received wildcards into the singles main draw:

- (Morocco) Amine Ahouda
- (Morocco) Ayoub Chakrouni
- (Morocco) Yassine Idmbarek
- (Morocco) Lamine Ouahab

The following players received entry from the qualifying draw:

- (Switzerland) Sandro Ehrat
- (France) Julien Obry
- (Spain) David Vega Hernández
- (Russia) Anton Zaitcev

== Champions ==
=== Singles ===
- (Spain) Daniel Gimeno Traver def. (Spain) Albert Ramos, 6–3, 6–4

=== Doubles ===
- (Croatia) Dino Marcan / (Croatia) Antonio Šančić def. (Spain) Gerard Granollers / (Spain) Jordi Samper-Montaña, 6–1, 7–6^{(7–3)}
