= 2015 Morocco Tennis Tour – Kenitra =

- Date: 14–20 September
- Edition: 3rd
- Surface: Clay
- Location: Kenitra, Morocco

Champions

Singles
- (Spain) Roberto Carballés Baena

Doubles
- (Spain) Gerard Granollers / (Spain) Oriol Roca Batalla
- Morocco Tennis Tour – Kenitra

The 2015 Morocco Tennis Tour – Kenitra was a professional tennis tournament played on clay courts. It was the 3rd edition of the tournament which was part of the 2015 ATP Challenger Tour. It took place in Kenitra, Morocco between 14 and 20 September.

== Singles main-draw entrants ==
=== Seeds ===
Country	Player	Rank^{1}	Seed
ESP	Daniel Muñoz de la Nava	89	1
BIH	Damir Džumhur	98	2
ARG	Facundo Argüello	140	3
ESP	Roberto Carballés Baena	159	4
AUT	Gerald Melzer	170	5
BEL	Germain Gigounon	188	6
ITA	Gianluca Naso	193	7
ITA	Matteo Viola	201	8

- ^{1} Rankings are as of September 7, 2015.

=== Other entrants ===
The following players received wildcards into the singles main draw:

- (Morocco) Amine Ahouda
- (Morocco) Khalid Allouch
- (Morocco) Mehdi Jdi
- (Morocco) Younès Rachidi

The following players received entry from the qualifying draw:

- (Germany) Kevin Krawietz
- (Switzerland) Luca Margaroli
- (Belgium) Yannik Reuter
- (Spain) Pol Toledo Bagué

== Champions ==
=== Singles ===
- (Spain) Roberto Carballés Baena def. (Spain) Oriol Roca Batalla, 6–1, 5–1 retired

=== Doubles ===
- (Spain) Gerard Granollers / (Spain) Oriol Roca Batalla def. (Germany) Kevin Krawietz / (Germany) Maximilian Marterer, 3–6, 7–6^{(7–4)}, [10–8]
