= Good to Great Tennis Academy =

Tennis academy in Danderyd, Sweden

- Established: 2011; 14 years ago
- Founders: Nicklas Kulti; Magnus Norman; Mikael Tillström
- Location: Danderyd, Sweden
- Coordinates: 59.4194°N 18.0469°E
- Website: goodtogreat.se

Good to Great Tennis Academy is a tennis academy and training center in Danderyd, Sweden. It was founded in 2011 as the country's first tennis academy.

== History ==
The Academy was founded in 2011 by Nicklas Kulti, Magnus Norman, and Mikael Tillström. In an interview with Tennis.com, Norman stated, "We want[ed] to build our own center, where the only focus is on developing future Top 100 players, no recreational players, only high performance."

Originally, the Academy rented space at SALK Hall in Bromma. However, in 2017, the Academy opened its own facility, named Catella Arena, in Danderyd. Catella Arena includes seven indoor and seven outdoor tennis courts, as well as a gym, restaurant, and student accommodations.

In November 2023, the Academy hosted the Good to Great Challenger on the ATP Challenger Tour.

== Notable people ==
=== Players ===
- Grigor Dimitrov
- Karl Friberg
- Johanna Larsson
- Niels McDonald
- Gaël Monfils
- Jonathan Mridha
- Rebecca Peterson
- Laura Robson
- Fred Simonsson
- Carl Söderlund
- Nellie Taraba Wallberg
- Viktoriya Tomova
- Botic van de Zandschulp
- Otto Virtanen
- Stan Wawrinka
- Daniel Windahl
- Elias Ymer
- Mikael Ymer
- Jürgen Zopp

=== Coaches ===
- Nicklas Kulti
- Magnus Norman
- Joakim Nyström
- Johan Örtegren
- Mikael Tillström
