= Good to Great Challenger =

- 2023 Good to Great Challenger

ATP Challenger Tour
- Event name: Good to Great Challenger
- Location: Danderyd, Sweden
- Venue: Good to Great Tennis Academy
- Category: ATP Challenger Tour
- Surface: Hard

The Good to Great Challenger is a professional tennis tournament played on hard courts. It is currently part of the ATP Challenger Tour. It was first held at the Good to Great Tennis Academy in Danderyd, Sweden in 2023.

== Past finals ==
=== Singles ===
Year	Champion	Runner-up	Score
2023	(Germany) Maximilian Marterer	(United States) Brandon Nakashima	2–6, 6–4, 6–3

=== Doubles ===
Year	Champions	Runners-up	Score
2023	(United Kingdom) Julian Cash (Netherlands) Bart Stevens	(India) Jeevan Nedunchezhiyan (India) Vijay Sundar Prashanth	6–7^{(7–9)}, 6–4, [10–7]
