= Maximilian Marterer =

German tennis player (born 1995)

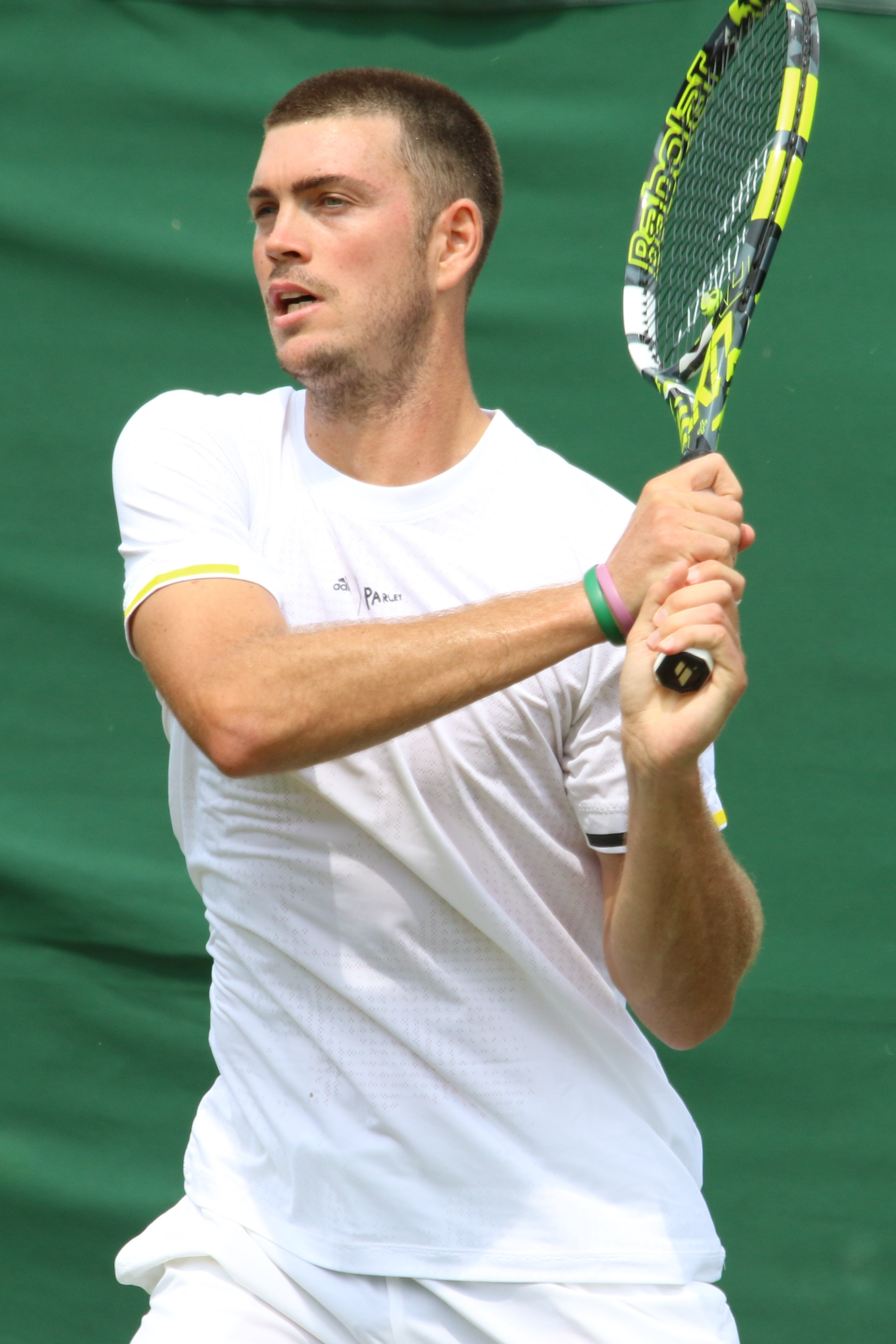
- Marterer at the 2023 Wimbledon Championships
- Country (sports): Germany
- Residence: Stein, Bavaria, Germany
- Born: 15 June 1995 (age 31) Nuremberg, Germany
- Height: 1.88 m (6 ft 2 in)
- Turned pro: 2015
- Plays: Left-handed (two-handed backhand)
- Coach: Gerald Radovici
- Prize money: US $3,516,727

Singles
- Career record: 42–79
- Career titles: 0
- Highest ranking: No. 45 (13 August 2018)
- Current ranking: No. 1,132 (9 November 2026)

Grand Slam singles results
- Australian Open: 3R (2018)
- French Open: 4R (2018)
- Wimbledon: 3R (2023)
- US Open: 1R (2017, 2018, 2021, 2022, 2024)

Other tournaments
- Olympic Games: 2R (2024)

Doubles
- Career record: 6–16
- Career titles: 0
- Highest ranking: No. 249 (29 April 2019)

Grand Slam doubles results
- Australian Open: 1R (2019)
- French Open: 1R (2018)
- Wimbledon: 1R (2018)
- US Open: 1R (2018)

Team competitions
- Davis Cup: SF (2024)
- Last updated on: 9 November 2026.

Maximilian Marterer (born 15 June 1995) is a German professional tennis player. He has a career-high ATP singles ranking of world No. 45, achieved on 13 August 2018 and a doubles ranking of No. 249 achieved on 29 April 2019.

== Professional career ==
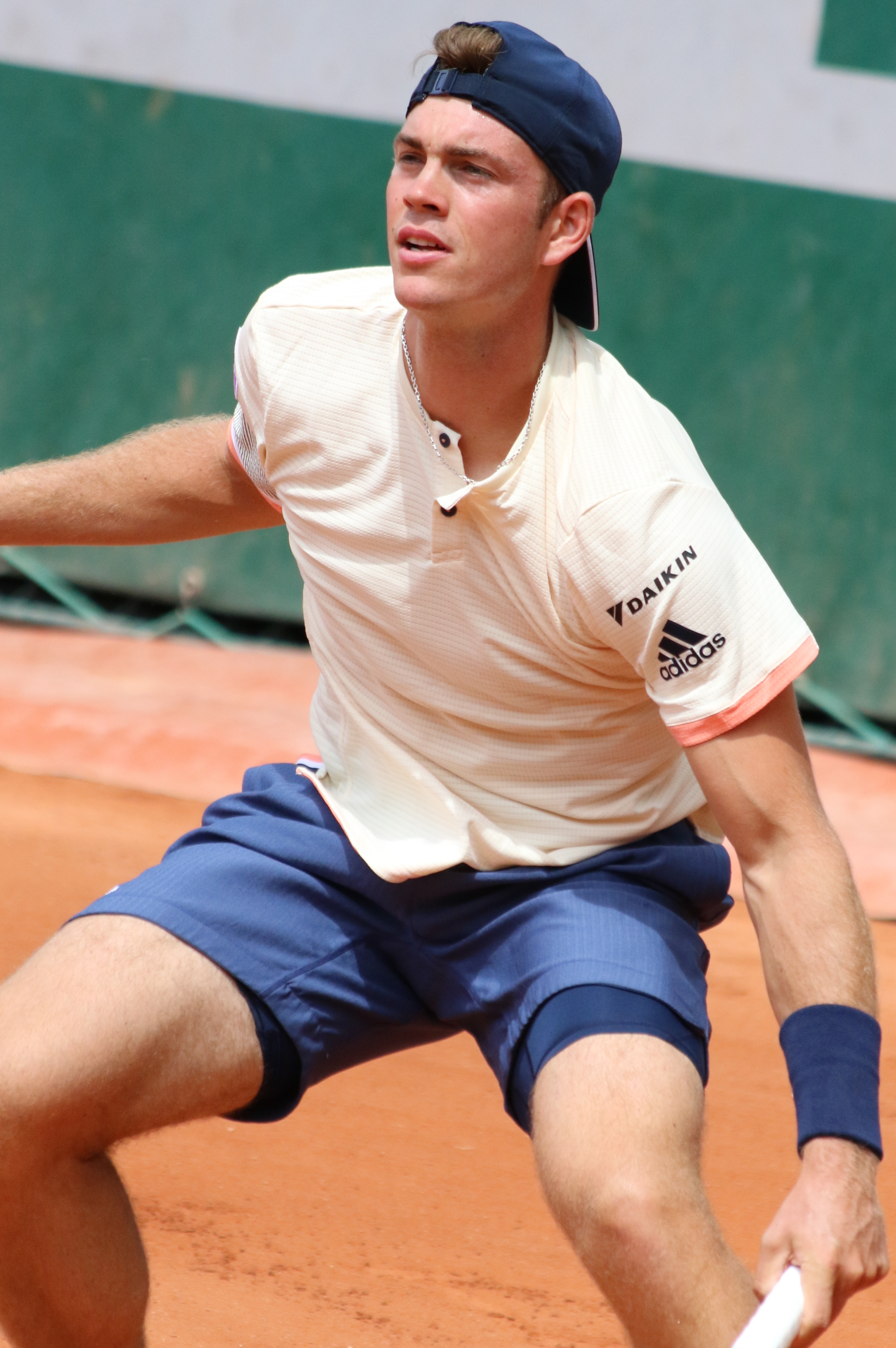
Marterer at the 2018 French Open

=== 2015-2017: ATP and top 100 debuts, Maiden Challenger title ===
Marterer made his ATP main draw debut at the 2015 MercedesCup in Stuttgart where he was given a wildcard into the singles event.

Marterer won his first ATP Challenger Tour singles title at the 2016 Morocco Tennis Tour in Meknes.

Marterer entered the world's top 100 for the first time, becoming world No. 100 on 16 October 2017.

=== 2018-2020: First ATP semifinal, French Open fourth round and top 50 ===
At the Australian Open, Marterer won his first ATP main draw match after losing 14 first round matches in a row. He defeated compatriot Cedrik-Marcel Stebe in straight sets. In the second round, he upset former top-10 player Fernando Verdasco in a five-setter before losing to Tennys Sandgren in the next round.

At the Sofia Open, he reached his first ATP quarterfinal, where he lost to eventual champion Mirza Bašić in three sets.

He reached his first ATP semifinal at the BMW Open in Munich where he lost to sixth seed Philipp Kohlschreiber.

At the French Open, he defeated American Ryan Harrison in straight sets in the first round to set up a second round clash against seeded teenager Denis Shapovalov. For both players it was their first appearance at the French Open, but it was Marterer who triumphed in four sets to reach the third round for the second consecutive Grand Slam. His run extended to the fourth round with a straight sets win over Jürgen Zopp. There, he lost to world No. 1 Rafael Nadal.

=== 2021: Back to Grand Slams and top 200 ===
Ranked outside the top 200 at No. 215, he qualified for the 2021 French Open but lost to Filip Krajinović in the first round.

Ranked World No. 209, he qualified for the main draw at the 2021 US Open after two years of absence but lost in the first round to Steve Johnson in a tight four-set match.

=== 2022: Back to top 150 ===
He qualified for two Grand Slams, the 2022 Australian Open after two years of absence, and the 2022 Wimbledon Championships after three years of absence at the All England Club, where he won his first round match at this Major defeating Aljaž Bedene before losing to 23rd seed Frances Tiafoe. He also qualified for the last Major of the year at the US Open.

=== 2023: Wimbledon third round, second ATP semifinal, back to Masters and top 100 ===
At the 2023 Indian Wells Open, he qualified after more than three years of absence at a Masters level and at this tournament, but lost in the first round to fellow qualifier Alejandro Tabilo.

He also qualified for the main draw of the 2023 Wimbledon Championships and won his first round match against Borna Gojo. Next he defeated lucky loser Michael Mmoh to reach the third round at this Major for the first time and only for the third time at this level.

He reached the semifinals at the 2023 European Open in Antwerp as a qualifier, defeating seventh seed Richard Gasquet, Nuno Borges and Hugo Gaston. He became the third qualifier in tournament history to reach the semifinals after Tsitsipas in 2017 and Brooksby in 2021 (both lost to Schwartzman in the semis).

In October, he was selected as the No. 2 ATP player at the 2024 United Cup as part of the German team. Following a Challenger final in Ismaning, Germany he returned to the top 100 on 6 November 2023.

=== 2024-2026: Olympics debut and first win, hiatus ===
Marterer recorded his first win at the 2024 French Open since 2018, defeating Jordan Thompson. He made his debut at the 2024 Paris Olympics and recorded his first win over Dušan Lajović.

== Performance timelines ==
Key
| W | F | SF | QF | #R | RR | Q# | P# | DNQ | A | Z# | PO | G | S | B | NMS | NTI | P | NH |

(W) winner; (F) finalist; (SF) semifinalist; (QF) quarterfinalist; (#R) rounds 4, 3, 2, 1; (RR) round-robin stage; (Q#) qualification round; (P#) preliminary round; (DNQ) did not qualify; (A) absent; (Z#) Davis/Fed Cup Zonal Group (with number indication) or (PO) play-off; (G) gold, (S) silver or (B) bronze Olympic/Paralympic medal; (NMS) not a Masters tournament; (NTI) not a Tier I tournament; (P) postponed; (NH) not held; (SR) strike rate (events won / competed); (W–L) win–loss record.
To avoid confusion and double counting, these charts are updated at the conclusion of a tournament or when the player's participation has ended.

=== Singles ===
Current through the 2025 ATP Tour.

| Tournament | 2015 | 2016 | 2017 | 2018 | 2019 | 2020 | 2021 | 2022 | 2023 | 2024 | 2025 | 2026 | SR | W–L |
|---|---|---|---|---|---|---|---|---|---|---|---|---|---|---|
Grand Slam tournaments
| Australian Open | A | Q1 | Q1 | 3R | 2R | Q1 | Q2 | 1R | Q1 | 1R | Q1 | A | 0 / 4 | 3–4 |
| French Open | A | A | Q2 | 4R | 1R | Q1 | 1R | Q1 | Q1 | 2R | 1R | A | 0 / 5 | 4–5 |
| Wimbledon | A | A | Q1 | 1R | A | NH | Q1 | 2R | 3R | 1R | Q1 | A | 0 / 4 | 3–4 |
| US Open | A | A | 1R | 1R | A | A | 1R | 1R | Q2 | 1R | A | A | 0 / 5 | 0–5 |
| Win–loss | 0–0 | 0–0 | 0–1 | 5–4 | 1–2 | 0–0 | 0–2 | 1–3 | 2–1 | 1–4 | 0–1 | 0–0 | 0 / 18 | 10–18 |
National representation
| Summer Olympics | NH | A | NH | | | | A | NH | | 2R | NH | | 0 / 1 | 1–1 |
| Davis Cup | A | A | A | A | A | A | A | A | G1 | SF | Q1 | A | 0 / 1 | 4–1 |
ATP 1000 tournaments
| Indian Wells Open | A | A | A | 2R | 2R | NH | A | A | 1R | Q1 | A | A | 0 / 3 | 2–3 |
| Miami Open | A | A | A | 2R | 2R | NH | A | A | Q1 | A | A | A | 0 / 2 | 2–1 |
| Monte-Carlo Masters | A | A | A | Q1 | Q1 | NH | A | A | A | Q1 | A | A | 0 / 0 | 0–0 |
| Madrid Open | A | A | A | A | A | NH | A | A | Q1 | Q1 | A | A | 0 / 0 | 0–0 |
| Italian Open | A | A | A | A | A | A | A | A | Q2 | 1R | A | A | 0 / 1 | 0–1 |
| Cincinnati Open | A | A | 1R | 1R | A | A | A | A | A | A | A | A | 0 / 2 | 0–2 |
| Shanghai Masters | A | A | A | 1R | A | NH | | | A | Q1 | A | A | 0 / 1 | 0–1 |
| Win–loss | 0–0 | 0–0 | 0–1 | 2–4 | 2–1 | 0–0 | 0–0 | 0–0 | 0–1 | 0–1 | 0–0 | 0–0 | 0 / 9 | 4–8 |
Career statistics
| Tournaments | 2 | 2 | 10 | 23 | 11 | 1 | 4 | 3 | 6 | 16 | 1 | 0 | 79 | |
| Overall win–loss | 0–2 | 0–2 | 0–10 | 18–23 | 5–10 | 2–1 | 0–4 | 1–3 | 9–6 | 6–17 | 1–1 | 0–0 | 42–79 | |
| Year-end ranking | 264 | 176 | 90 | 74 | 239 | 209 | 229 | 159 | 91 | 184 | 739 | | 35% | |

== ATP Challenger finals ==
=== Singles: 14 (9–5) ===
Finals by surface
Hard (4–1)
Clay (4–3)
Carpet (1–1)

| Result | W–L | Date | Tournament | Surface | Opponent | Score |
|---|---|---|---|---|---|---|
| Loss | 0–1 | Aug 2016 | Meerbusch, Germany | Clay | (Germany) Florian Mayer | 6–7^{(4–7)}, 2–6 |
| Win | 1–1 | Sep 2016 | Meknes, Morocco | Clay | (Belarus) Uladzimir Ignatik | 7–6^{(7–3)}, 6–3 |
| Win | 2–1 | Sep 2016 | Kenitra, Morocco | Clay | (Egypt) Mohamed Safwat | 6–2, 6–4 |
| Loss | 2–2 | Feb 2017 | Cherbourg, France | Hard (i) | (France) Mathias Bourgue | 3–6, 6–7^{(3–7)} |
| Win | 3–2 | Sep 2017 | Banja Luka, Bosnia & Herzeg. | Clay | (Spain) Carlos Taberner | 6–1, 6–2 |
| Win | 4–2 | Oct 2017 | Monterrey, Mexico | Hard | (United States) Bradley Klahn | 7–6^{(7–3)}, 7–6^{(8–6)} |
| Win | 5–2 | Nov 2017 | Eckental, Germany | Carpet (i) | (Poland) Jerzy Janowicz | 7–6^{(10–8)}, 3–6, 6–3 |
| Win | 6–2 | Feb 2018 | Cherbourg, France | Hard (i) | (France) Constant Lestienne | 6–4, 7–5 |
| Win | 7–2 | Nov 2020 | Bratislava, Slovakia | Hard (i) | (Czech Republic) Tomáš Macháč | 6–7^{(3–7)}, 6–2, 7–5 |
| Loss | 7–3 | Jul 2022 | Braunschweig, Germany | Clay | (Germany) Jan-Lennard Struff | 2–6, 2–6 |
| Win | 8–3 | Jul 2023 | Amersfoort, Netherlands | Clay | (France) Titouan Droguet | 6–4, 6–2 |
| Loss | 8–4 | Nov 2023 | Ismaning, Germany | Carpet (i) | (Switzerland) Antoine Bellier | 6–7^{(5–7)}, 7–6^{(7–5)}, 6–7^{(6–8)} |
| Win | 9–4 | Nov 2023 | Danderyd, Sweden | Hard (i) | (United States) Brandon Nakashima | 2–6, 6–4, 6–3 |
| Loss | 9–5 | Aug 2024 | Bonn, Germany | Clay | (Bolivia) Hugo Dellien | 6–7^{(2–7)}, 0–6 |

=== Doubles: 4 (2–2) ===
Finals by surface
Hard (0–0)
Clay (2–2)

| Result | W–L | Date | Tournament | Surface | Partner | Opponents | Score |
|---|---|---|---|---|---|---|---|
| Win | 1–0 | Sep 2015 | Meknes, Morocco | Clay | (Germany) Kevin Krawietz | (Italy) Gianluca Naso (Italy) Riccardo Sinicropi | 7–5, 6–1 |
| Loss | 1–1 | Sep 2015 | Kenitra, Morocco | Clay | (Germany) Kevin Krawietz | (Spain) Gerard Granollers (Spain) Oriol Roca Batalla | 6–3, 6–7^{(4–7)}, [8–10] |
| Win | 2–1 | Sep 2016 | Kenitra, Morocco | Clay | (Germany) Kevin Krawietz | (Belarus) Uladzimir Ignatik (Austria) Michael Linzer | 7–6^{(8–6)}, 4–6, [10–6] |
| Loss | 2–2 | Sep 2021 | Bucharest, Romania | Clay | (Czech Republic) Lukáš Rosol | (Philippines) Ruben Gonzales (United States) Hunter Johnson | 6–1, 2–6, [3–10] |

== ITF Futures finals ==
=== Singles: 13 (7–6) ===
Finals by surface
Hard (2–1)
Clay (3–3)
Carpet (2–2)

| Result | W–L | Date | Tournament | Surface | Opponent | Score |
|---|---|---|---|---|---|---|
| Loss | 0–1 | Oct 2013 | Germany F19, Essen | Hard (i) | (Slovakia) Adrian Sikora | 7–6^{(7–5)}, 4–6, 1–6 |
| Loss | 0–2 | May 2014 | Slovenia F1, Koper | Clay | (Slovenia) Janez Semrajc | 6–3, 3–6, 4–6 |
| Loss | 0–3 | Jun 2014 | Poland F4, Wrocław | Clay | (Czech Republic) Jan Šátral | 4–6, 6–7^{(4–7)} |
| Loss | 0–4 | Aug 2014 | Germany F13, Überlingen | Clay | (Germany) Nils Langer | 4–6, 6–3, 2–6 |
| Loss | 0–5 | Oct 2014 | Germany F17, Göhren-Lebbin | Carpet (i) | (Germany) Mats Moraing | 6–7^{(4–7)}, 6–7^{(4–7)} |
| Win | 1–5 | Jan 2015 | Germany F2, Stuttgart | Hard (i) | (Belarus) Uladzimir Ignatik | 6–4, 4–6, 7–5 |
| Win | 2–5 | Jan 2015 | Germany F3, Kaarst | Carpet (i) | (Czech Republic) Marek Michalička | 7–6^{(7–5)}, 6–4 |
| Loss | 2–6 | Feb 2015 | Germany F4, Nußloch | Carpet (i) | (Belgium) Ruben Bemelmans | 3–6, 7–6^{(7–2)}, 6–7^{(5–7)} |
| Win | 3–6 | Jun 2015 | Italy F15, Basilicanova | Clay | (Slovenia) Tom Kočevar-Dešman | 6–3, 6–2 |
| Win | 4–6 | Oct 2015 | Germany F14, Hambach | Carpet (i) | (Germany) Marc Sieber | 6–2, 6–2 |
| Win | 5–6 | Apr 2016 | Tunisia F13, Hammamet | Clay | (France) Jules Okala | 6–2, 6–1 |
| Win | 6–6 | Jul 2016 | Germany F7, Trier | Clay | (Argentina) Federico Coria | 6–1, 6–2 |
| Win | 7–6 | Nov 2026 | M25 Montreal, Canada | Hard (i) | (United States) Cannon Kingsley | 6–1, 5–7, 7–6^{(7–2)} |

=== Doubles: 6 (5–1) ===
Finals by surface
Hard (0–1)
Clay (4–0)
Carpet (1–0)

| Result | W–L | Date | Tournament | Surface | Partner | Opponents | Score |
|---|---|---|---|---|---|---|---|
| Win | 1–0 | Jun 2014 | Poland F4, Wrocław | Clay | (Germany) Kevin Kaczynski | (Poland) Adam Majchrowicz (Poland) Rafal Teurer | 6–4, 6–4 |
| Win | 2–0 | Oct 2014 | Germany F16, Bad Salzdetfurth | Carpet (i) | (Germany) Kevin Krawietz | (Germany) Denis Kapric (Germany) Lukas Ruepke | 6–3, 7–6^{(7–4)} |
| Win | 3–0 | Nov 2014 | Turkey F40, Antalya | Clay | (Germany) Kevin Krawietz | (Slovenia) Janez Semrajc (Austria) Tristan-Samuel Weissborn | 6–3, 6–2 |
| Loss | 3–1 | Jan 2015 | Germany F2, Stuttgart | Hard (i) | (Germany) Kevin Krawietz | (France) Tom Jomby (France) Mick Lescure | 6–7^{(4–7)}, 4–6 |
| Win | 4–1 | Jun 2015 | Italy F15, Basilicanova | Clay | (Germany) Daniel Masur | (Spain) Gerard Granollers (Netherlands) Mark Vervoort | 6–2, 1–6, [10–4] |
| Win | 5–1 | Jul 2015 | Germany F5, Kenn | Clay | (Germany) Kevin Krawietz | (Germany) Max Bohl (Germany) Benedikt Müller | 6–0, 6–1 |

== Junior Grand Slam finals ==
=== Doubles: 1 (1 runner-up) ===
| Result | Date | Tournament | Surface | Partner | Opponents | Score |
|---|---|---|---|---|---|---|
| Loss | 2013 | Australian Open | Hard | (Austria) Lucas Miedler | (Australia) Bradley Mousley (Australia) Jay Andrijic | 3–6, 6–7^{(3–7)} |
