= Daniel Gimeno Traver =

Spanish tennis player (born 1985)

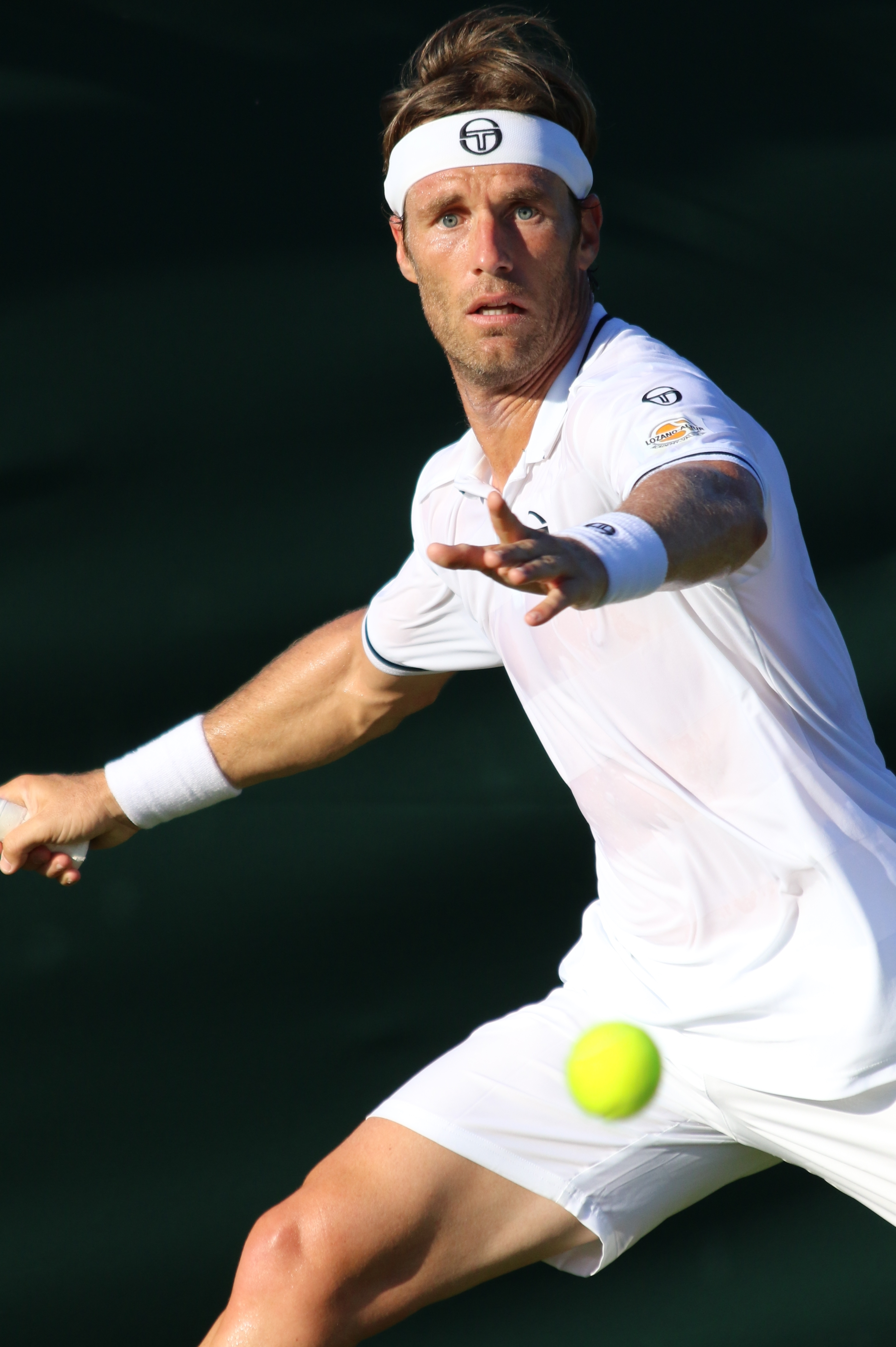
- Gimeno Traver at the 2018 Wimbledon Championships
- Country (sports): Spain
- Residence: Nules, Castellón, Spain
- Born: 7 August 1985 (age 41) Valencia, Spain
- Height: 1.83 m (6 ft 0 in)
- Turned pro: 2004
- Retired: 2021
- Plays: Right-handed (two-handed backhand)
- Prize money: $3,286,850

Singles
- Career record: 97–173
- Career titles: 0
- Highest ranking: No. 48 (18 March 2013)

Grand Slam singles results
- Australian Open: 2R (2013)
- French Open: 2R (2009, 2010, 2013, 2015)
- Wimbledon: 2R (2009)
- US Open: 3R (2010)

Doubles
- Career record: 42–82
- Career titles: 1
- Highest ranking: No. 63 (6 February 2012)

Grand Slam doubles results
- Australian Open: 2R (2011)
- French Open: 3R (2013)
- Wimbledon: 1R (2013, 2015)
- US Open: 3R (2010)

Daniel Gimeno Traver (Spanish pronunciation: [daˈnjel xiˈmeno tɾaˈβeɾ]; born 7 August 1985) is a Spanish tennis coach and a former professional player. He is also the current director of the Copa Faulconbridge. He reached a career-high singles ranking of World No. 48 in March 2013. Gimeno Traver won 14 Challenger events.

== Personal life ==
Daniel Gimeno Traver was born 7 August 1985 in Valencia, Spain. He is the son of Javier, a chemist, and Marisol, a nurse, and is the second of four brothers, Carlos, Miguel and Víctor being his siblings.

Gimeno Traver started playing tennis at the age of 2. His favorite surface was clay.

== Professional Career ==
=== Juniors ===
As a junior, he won the European Championships in 2003 beating Marcos Baghdatis in Switzerland. Gimeno Traver won a further 5 junior titles, compiling a singles win–loss record of 51–10 and reaching as high as No. 4 in the junior world rankings in May 2003. He also beat Novak Djokovic on the way to the quarterfinals at Roland Garros, losing to Jo-Wilfried Tsonga.

Grand Slam results:

Australian Open: -
French Open: QF (2003)
Wimbledon: 1R (2003)
US Open: 3R (2003)

=== ATP Tour ===
Gimeno Traver reached the ATP World Tour semifinals in Stuttgart and Gstaad in 2010, St. Petersburg in 2012 and in Oeiras in 2014.

His best Grand Slam performance was at the 2010 US Open, when he beat Jarkko Nieminen and Jérémy Chardy to reach the third round.

At the 2015 Grand Prix Hassan II, Gimeno Traver defeated seeded players Mikhail Kukushkin and Jiří Veselý to reach his first ATP 250 final, where he lost to Martin Kližan.

== Coaching career ==
Following his retirement in 2021, Gimeno Traver coached Roberto Bautista Agut starting in the 2022 season. With him, Bautista Agut won 3 titles and reached a further 2 finals.

== ATP career finals ==
=== Singles: 1 (1 runner-up) ===
Legend Grand Slam tournaments (0–0) ATP World Tour Finals (0–0) ATP World Tour Masters 1000 (0–0) ATP World Tour 500 Series (0–0) ATP World Tour 250 Series (0–1)	Titles by surface Hard (0–0) Clay (0–1) Grass (0–0)	Titles by setting Outdoor (0–1) Indoor (0–0)

Result	W–L	Date	Tournament	Tier	Surface	Opponent	Score
Loss	0–1	Apr 2015	Grand Prix Hassan II, Morocco	250 Series	Clay	(Slovakia) Martin Kližan	2–6, 2–6

=== Doubles: 2 (1 title, 1 runner-up) ===
Legend Grand Slam tournaments (0–0) ATP World Tour Finals (0–0) ATP World Tour Masters 1000 (0–0) ATP World Tour 500 Series (0–0) ATP World Tour 250 Series (1–1)	Titles by surface Hard (0–0) Clay (1–1) Grass (0–0)	Titles by setting Outdoor (1–1) Indoor (0–0)

Result	W–L	Date	Tournament	Tier	Surface	Partner	Opponents	Score
Loss	0–1	Feb 2011	Brasil Open, Brazil	250 Series	Clay	(Spain) Pablo Andújar	(Brazil) Marcelo Melo (Brazil) Bruno Soares	6–7^{(4–7)}, 3–6
Win	1–1	Feb 2012	Chile Open, Chile	250 Series	Clay	(Portugal) Fred Gil	(Spain) Pablo Andújar (Argentina) Carlos Berlocq	1–6, 7–5, [12–10]

== Challenger career finals ==
=== Singles (14–11) ===
No.	Date	Tournament	Surface	Opponent	Score
1.	9 August 2004	Cordenons	Clay	(Austria) Daniel Köllerer	4–6, 6–4, 6–3
2.	12 May 2008	Aarhus	Clay	(France) Éric Prodon	7–5, 7–5
3.	1 September 2008	Brașov	Clay	(Germany) Alexander Flock	4–6, 6–4, 6–4
4.	14 September 2009	Banja Luka	Clay	(Germany) Julian Reister	6–4, 6–1
5.	5 October 2009	Tarragona	Clay	(Italy) Paolo Lorenzi	6–4, 6–0
6.	2 August 2010	Segovia	Hard	(France) Adrian Mannarino	6–4, 7–6^{(7–2)}
7.	11 September 2011	Sevilla	Clay	(Spain) Rubén Ramírez Hidalgo	6–3, 6–3
8.	17 June 2012	Monza	Clay	(Spain) Albert Montañés	6–2, 4–6, 6–4
9.	10 September 2012	Sevilla	Clay	(Spain) Tommy Robredo	6–3, 6–2
10.	30 September 2012	Madrid	Clay	(Germany) Jan-Lennard Struff	6–4, 6–2
11.	2 September 2013	Alphen aan den Rijn	Clay	(Netherlands) Thomas Schoorel	6–2, 6–4
12.	10 September 2013	Sevilla	Clay	(France) Stéphane Robert	6–4, 7–6^{(7–2)}
13.	28 September 2014	Kenitra	Clay	(Spain) Albert Ramos	6–3, 6–4
14.	1 February 2015	Bucaramanga	Clay	(Portugal) Gastão Elias	6–3, 1–6, 7–5

==== Runners-up ====
No.	Date	Tournament	Surface	Opponent	Score
1.	5 September 2005	Brașov	Clay	(Germany) Daniel Elsner	5–7, 2–6
2.	5 November 2007	Guayaquil	Clay	(Ecuador) Nicolás Lapentti	3–6, 7–6^{(6)}, 5–7
3.	10 March 2008	Tanger	Clay	(Spain) Marcel Granollers	4–6, 4–6
4.	15 September 2008	Banja Luka	Clay	(Serbia) Ilija Bozoljac	4–6, 4–6
5.	12 October 2009	Asunción	Clay	(Paraguay) Ramón Delgado	6–7^{(2–7)}, 6–1, 3–6
6.	5 July 2010	San Benedetto	Clay	(Argentina) Carlos Berlocq	3–6, 6–4, 4–6
7.	2 October 2011	Madrid	Clay	(France) Jérémy Chardy	1–6, 7–5, 6–7^{(3–7)}
8.	12 August 2012	Cordenons	Clay	(Italy) Paolo Lorenzi	6–7^{(5–7)}, 3–6
9.	21 August 2016	Cordenons	Clay	(Japan) Taro Daniel	3–6, 4–6
10.	1 October 2017	Rome	Clay	(Serbia) Filip Krajinović	4–6, 3–6
11.	22 April 2018	Tunis	Clay	(Argentina) Guido Andreozzi	2–6, 0–3 ret.

=== Doubles (3–6) ===
No.	Date	Tournament	Surface	Partner	Opponents	Score
1.	1 May 2006	Tunis, Tunisia	Clay	(Spain) Iván Navarro	(Netherlands) Bart Beks (Netherlands Antilles) Martijn van Haasteren	6–2, 7–5
2.	5 May 2008	Telde, Spain	Clay	(Spain) Daniel Muñoz	(Spain) Miguel Ángel López (Spain) José Antonio Sánchez	6–3, 6–1
3.	29 September 2012	Madrid, Spain	Clay	(Spain) Iván Navarro	(Australia) Colin Ebelthite (Czech Republic) Jaroslav Pospíšil	6–2, 4–6, [10–7]

==== Runners-up ====
No.	Date	Tournament	Surface	Partner	Opponents	Score
1.	15 August 2005	Cordenons, Italy	Clay	(Netherlands) Melle van Gemerden	(Austria) Daniel Köllerer (Austria) Oliver Marach	WEA (no winner)
2.	13 October 2008	Montevideo, Uruguay	Clay	(Spain) Rubén Ramírez	(Brazil) Franco Ferreiro (Brazil) Flávio Saretta	3–6, 2–6
3.	19 September 2009	Florianópolis, Brazil	Clay	(Spain) Pere Riba	(Poland) Tomasz Bednarek (Poland) Mateusz Kowalczyk	1–6, 4–6
4.	20 August 2011	San Sebastián, Spain	Clay	(Spain) Israel Sevilla	(Italy) Stefano Ianni (Italy) Simone Vagnozzi	3–6, 4–6
5.	1 October 2011	Madrid, Spain	Clay	(United Kingdom) Morgan Phillips	(Spain) David Marrero (Spain) Rubén Ramírez Hidalgo	4–6, 7–6^{(10–8)}, [9–11]
6.	10 June 2012	Caltanissetta, Italy	Clay	(Spain) Iván Navarro	(Uruguay) Marcel Felder (Croatia) Antonio Veić	7–5, 6–7^{(5–7)}, [6–10]

== Performance timelines ==
Key
W	F	SF	QF	#R	RR	Q#	DNQ	A	NH

(W) winner; (F) finalist; (SF) semifinalist; (QF) quarterfinalist; (#R) rounds 4, 3, 2, 1; (RR) round-robin stage; (Q#) qualification round; (DNQ) did not qualify; (A) absent; (NH) not held; (SR) strike rate (events won / competed); (W–L) win–loss record.
To avoid confusion and double counting, these charts are updated at the conclusion of a tournament or when the player's participation has ended.

Current till 2018 Wimbledon Championships.

=== Singles ===
Tournament	2005	2006	2007	2008	2009	2010	2011	2012	2013	2014	2015	2016	2017	2018	W–L
Grand Slam tournaments
Australian Open	A	A	A	A	1R	1R	1R	1R	2R	1R	A	1R	A	A	1–7
French Open	1R	Q2	A	A	2R	2R	1R	1R	2R	1R	2R	Q2	Q1	Q2	4–8
Wimbledon	A	A	A	A	2R	1R	1R	A	1R	1R	1R	A	Q1	Q2	1–6
US Open	A	A	A	A	1R	3R	1R	1R	1R	1R	1R	A	A		2–7
Win–loss	0–1	0–0	0–0	0–0	2–4	3–4	0–4	0–3	2–4	0–4	1–3	0–1	0–0	0–0	8–28
Year-end ranking	192	267	170	90	72	56	107	70	77	112	98	115	365	178	

=== Doubles ===
Tournament	2009	2010	2011	2012	2013	2014	2015	2016	2017	2018	W–L
Grand Slam tournaments
Australian Open	1R	1R	2R	1R	1R	1R	A	A	A	A	1–6
French Open	2R	A	2R	1R	3R	A	2R	A	A	A	5–5
Wimbledon	A	A	1R	A	1R	A	1R	A	A		0–3
US Open	A	3R	2R	A	1R	A	1R	A	A		3–3
Win–loss	1–2	2–2	3–4	0–2	2–4	0–1	1–3	0–0	0–0	0–0	9–18

== Wins over top 10 players ==
- He has a 3–20 (.130) record against players who were, at the time the match was played, ranked in the top 10.

Season	2004–2009	2010	2011	2012	2013	2014–2019	Total
Wins	0	1	1	0	1	0	3

#	Player	Rank	Tournament	Surface	Rd	Score
2010
1.	(Russia) Nikolay Davydenko	6	Stuttgart, Germany	Clay	2R	7–6^{(9–7)}, 2–6, 6–1
2011
2.	(Austria) Jürgen Melzer	8	Madrid, Spain	Clay	2R	7–6^{(10–8)}, 6–3
2013
3.	(France) Richard Gasquet	9	Madrid, Spain	Clay	2R	7–5, 3–6, 6–4
