= Gerard Granollers =

Spanish tennis player (born 1989)

Gerard Granollers Pujol
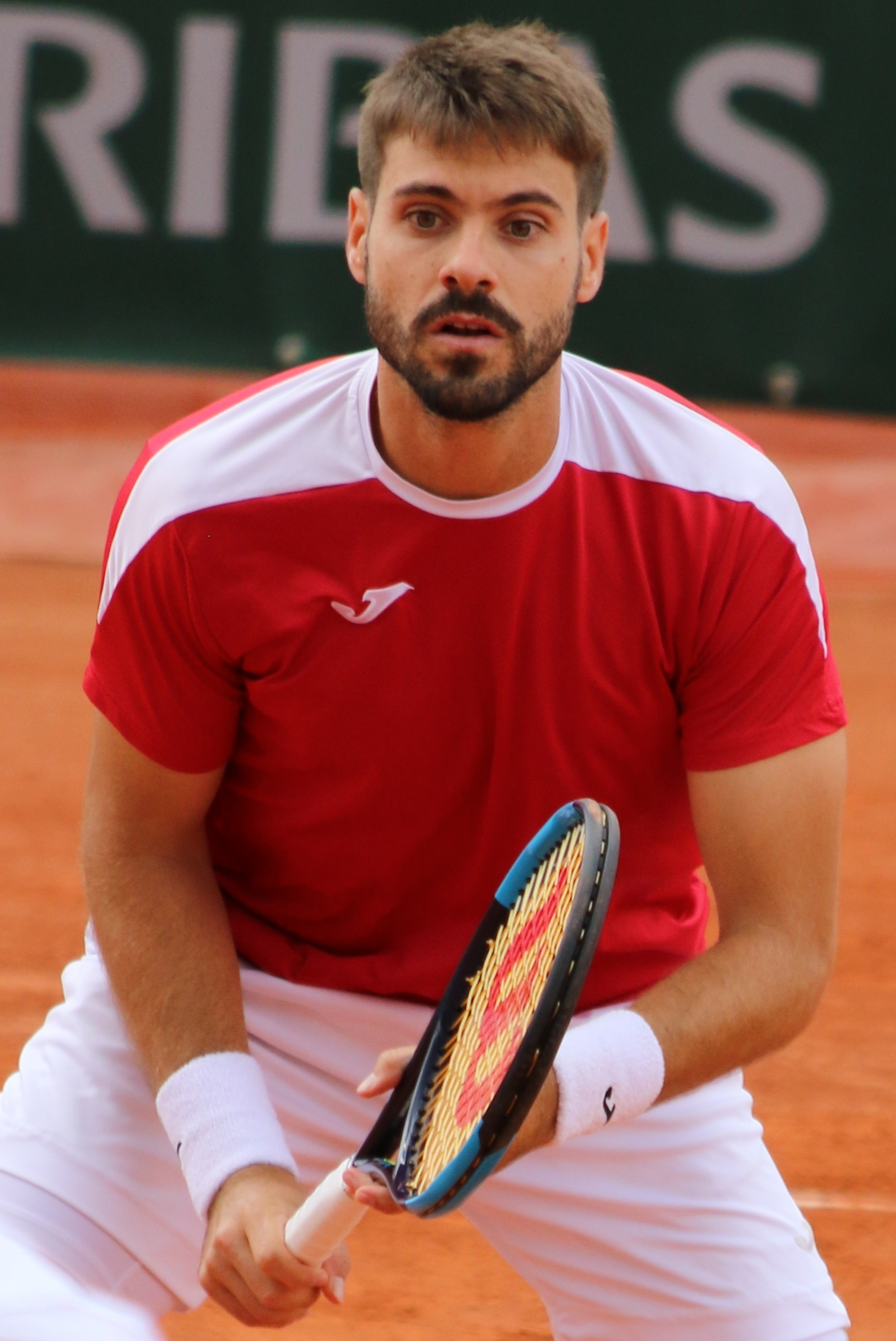
- Granollers at the 2019 French Open
- Country (sports): Spain
- Residence: Barcelona, Spain
- Born: 30 January 1989 (age 37) Barcelona, Spain
- Height: 6 ft 0 in (183 cm)
- Retired: 2021 (last match played)
- Plays: Right handed
- Prize money: US $408,897

Singles
- Career record: 0–4
- Career titles: 0
- Highest ranking: No. 217 (5 August 2013)

Grand Slam singles results
- Australian Open: Q1 (2012, 2014)
- French Open: Q1 (2014)
- Wimbledon: Q1 (2014)
- US Open: Q1 (2013)

Doubles
- Career record: 7–18
- Career titles: 0
- Highest ranking: No. 92 (24 December 2018)

Grand Slam doubles results
- Australian Open: 1R (2019)
- French Open: 1R (2019)
- Wimbledon: 1R (2019)
Medal record
Representing Spain
Men's Tennis
Mediterranean Games
Bronze medal – third place	2009 Pescara	Men's doubles
- Last updated on: 3 October 2022.

Gerard Granollers Pujol (Catalan pronunciation: [ʒəˈɾaɾ ɣɾənuˈʎes puˈʒɔl]; Spanish: [ɟʝeˈɾaɾ ɣɾanoˈʎeɾs puˈʝol]; (Note: In isolation, Granollers is pronounced [ɡɾənuˈʎes] in Catalan and [ɡɾanoˈʎeɾs] in Spanish.) born 30 January 1989 in Barcelona) is a former professional tennis player from Spain. He has won 12 ATP Challenger Tour titles, all of them in doubles. His brother Marcel is also a tennis player, and they have won five Challenger doubles titles together.

== Grand Slam performance timelines ==
Key
W	F	SF	QF	#R	RR	Q#	DNQ	A	NH

(W) winner; (F) finalist; (SF) semifinalist; (QF) quarterfinalist; (#R) rounds 4, 3, 2, 1; (RR) round-robin stage; (Q#) qualification round; (DNQ) did not qualify; (A) absent; (NH) not held; (SR) strike rate (events won / competed); (W–L) win–loss record.
To avoid confusion and double counting, these charts are updated at the conclusion of a tournament or when the player's participation has ended.

=== Singles ===
Tournament	2012	2013	2014	2015– 19	2020	SR	W–L
Australian Open	Q1	A	Q1	A	A	0 / 0	0–0
French Open	A	A	Q1	A	A	0 / 0	0–0
Wimbledon	A	A	Q1	A	NH	0 / 0	0–0
US Open	A	Q1	A	A	A	0 / 0	0–0
Win–loss	0–0	0–0	0–0	0–0	0–0	0 / 0	0–0

=== Doubles ===
Tournament	2019	2020	SR	W–L
Australian Open	1R	A	0 / 1	0–1
French Open	1R	A	0 / 1	0–1
Wimbledon	1R	NH	0 / 1	0–1
US Open	A	A	0 / 0	0–0
Win–loss	0–3	0–0	0 / 3	0–3

== ATP Challenger and ITF Futures finals ==
=== Singles: 37 (16–21) ===
Legend ATP Challenger (0–0) ITF Futures (16–21)	Finals by surface Hard (5–3) Clay (11–17) Grass (0–0) Carpet (0–1)

Result	W–L	Date	Tournament	Tier	Surface	Opponent	Score
Loss	0–1	Aug 2008	Spain F29, Xàtiva	Futures	Clay	(Spain) Roberto Bautista Agut	4–6, 4–6
Loss	0–2	Jul 2009	Romania F9, Iași	Futures	Clay	(Romania) Victor Ioniță	6–4, 2–6, 1–6
Loss	0–3	Aug 2009	Spain F25, Dénia	Futures	Clay	(Portugal) Pedro Sousa	0–6, 2–6
Loss	0–4	Apr 2010	Turkey F5, Antalya	Futures	Clay	(France) Gianni Mina	3–6, 1–6
Loss	0–5	Jun 2010	Morocco F3, Rabat	Futures	Clay	(France) Augustin Gensse	3–6, 4–6
Loss	0–6	Jun 2010	Morocco F4, Kenitra	Futures	Clay	(France) Florian Reynet	6–1, 2–6, 2–6
Loss	0–7	Oct 2010	Egypt F4, Cairo	Futures	Clay	(Russia) Aleksandr Lobkov	4–6, 2–6
Win	1–7	Mar 2011	Portugal F2, Loulé	Futures	Hard	(Slovakia) Kamil Čapkovič	6–3, 6–3
Win	2–7	Mar 2011	Portugal F3, Albufeira	Futures	Hard	(Poland) Adam Chadaj	7–6^{(7–3)}, 4–6, 7–5
Loss	2–8	May 2011	Spain F17, Getxo	Futures	Clay	(Spain) Guillermo Olaso	7–5, 0–6, 2–6
Win	3–8	Jun 2011	Romania F3, Craiova	Futures	Clay	(Romania) Petru-Alexandru Luncanu	6–4, 6–4
Loss	3–9	Jun 2011	Italy F14, Padua	Futures	Clay	(Austria) Philipp Oswald	4–6, 3–6
Win	4–9	Sep 2011	Spain F31, Santander	Futures	Clay	(Germany) Alexander Flock	7–6^{(7–5)}, 4–6, 7–6^{(7–1)}
Win	5–9	Oct 2011	Spain F37, Sant Cugat	Futures	Clay	(Spain) Marc Fornell Mestres	6–2, 6–4
Loss	5–10	Jun 2012	Spain F16, Martos	Futures	Hard	(Spain) José Checa Calvo	4–6, 3–6
Win	6–10	Sep 2012	Spain F30, Seville	Futures	Clay	(Australia) Jason Kubler	6–0, 4–6, 6–1
Loss	6–11	Oct 2012	Spain F32, Sabadell	Futures	Clay	(Spain) Roberto Carballés Baena	4–6, 1–6
Loss	6–12	Feb 2013	Turkey F4, Antalya	Futures	Hard	(Chinese Taipei) Huang Liang-chi	6–2, 4–6, 3–6
Win	7–12	Mar 2013	Turkey F11, Antalya	Futures	Hard	(France) Jules Marie	6–2, 6–0
Loss	7–13	Apr 2013	Spain F9, Villajoyosa	Futures	Carpet	(Spain) Roberto Ortega Olmedo	0–6, 7–5, 3–6
Loss	7–14	May 2013	Spain F11, Vic	Futures	Clay	(Spain) José Checa Calvo	6–3, 4–6, 0–6
Loss	7–15	Jun 2013	Romania F3, Bacău	Futures	Clay	(Spain) Jordi Samper Montaña	4–6, 3–6
Win	8–15	Jun 2013	Spain F19, Palma del Río	Futures	Hard	(Spain) Roberto Carballés Baena	7–6^{(7–5)}, 4–6, 6–3
Win	9–15	Sep 2013	Spain F32, Seville	Futures	Clay	(Germany) Jean-Marc Werner	6–1, 4–6, 6–1
Loss	9–16	Oct 2013	Hungary F1, Budapest	Futures	Clay	(Belgium) Niels Desein	7–5, 3–6, 2–6
Loss	9–17	Mar 2014	Croatia F4, Poreč	Futures	Clay	(Croatia) Duje Kekez	1–6, 1–6
Win	10–17	Nov 2014	Morocco F4, Casablanca	Futures	Clay	(Netherlands) Matwé Middelkoop	6–4, 6–2
Loss	10–18	Feb 2015	Tunisia F4, El Kantaoui	Futures	Hard	(Germany) Peter Heller	5–7, 6–7^{(6–8)}
Win	11–18	May 2015	Spain F12, Lleida	Futures	Clay	(Spain) Álvaro López San Martín	1–6, 7–6^{(7–5)}, 6–4
Win	12–18	May 2015	Spain F15, Santa Margarida de Montbui	Futures	Hard	(Japan) Yasutaka Uchiyama	6–7^{(1–7)}, 7–6^{(7–4)}, 6–3
Win	13–18	Aug 2015	Estonia F1, Pärnu	Futures	Clay	(Estonia) Vladimir Ivanov	6–2, 6–4
Win	14–18	Aug 2015	Romania F12, Iași	Futures	Clay	(Lithuania) Laurynas Grigelis	6–3, 3–6, 7–6^{(7–0)}
Loss	14–19	Oct 2015	Spain F31, Sabadell	Futures	Clay	(Spain) Marc Giner	3–6, 6–1, 3–6
Win	15–19	Jan 2016	Spain F1, Castelldefels	Futures	Clay	(Canada) Steven Diez	6–3, 6–1
Loss	15–20	Mar 2016	Spain F6, Tarragona	Futures	Clay	(Canada) Steven Diez	7–5, 1–6, 0–6
Win	16–20	Apr 2017	Portugal F5, Cascais	Futures	Clay	(Japan) Makoto Ochi	6–1, 6–3
Loss	16–21	May 2017	Spain F12, Lleida	Futures	Clay	(Spain) Pedro Martínez	3–6, 7–5, 4–6

=== Doubles: 91 (61–30) ===
Legend ATP Challenger (15–13) ITF Futures (46–17)	Finals by surface Hard (15–7) Clay (46–22) Grass (0–0) Carpet (0–1)

Result	W–L	Date	Tournament	Tier	Surface	Partner	Opponents	Score
Loss	0–1	Apr 2007	Spain F15, Reus	Futures	Clay	(Spain) Julián Alonso	(Spain) David Marrero (Spain) Pablo Santos González	4–6, 4–6
Win	1–1	Aug 2007	Spain F31, Irun	Futures	Clay	(Spain) David Díaz-Ventura	(Spain) Agustín Boje-Ordóñez (Spain) Pablo Martín-Adalia	6–3, 1–6, 6–2
Loss	1–2	Apr 2008	Spain F16, Reus	Futures	Clay	(Spain) Ignacio Coll Riudavets	(Spain) David Cañudas-Fernández (Spain) Pedro Clar Rosselló	3–6, 6–4, [8–10]
Loss	1–3	Jun 2008	Spain F24, Santa Cruz de Tenerife	Futures	Hard	(Spain) Ignacio Coll Riudavets	(Spain) Agustín Boje-Ordóñez (Spain) Pablo Martín-Adalia	4–6, 3–6
Loss	1–4	Jul 2008	Spain F27, Gandia	Futures	Clay	(Spain) Íñigo Cervantes Huegun	(Netherlands) Stephan Fransen (Netherlands) Romano Frantzen	6–7^{(2–7)}, 3–6
Win	2–4	Aug 2008	Spain F29, Xàtiva	Futures	Clay	(Spain) Ignacio Coll Riudavets	(Netherlands) Stephan Fransen (Netherlands) Romano Frantzen	7–6^{(7–5)}, 0–6, [10–5]
Win	3–4	Aug 2008	Spain F31, Irun	Futures	Clay	(Spain) Íñigo Cervantes Huegun	(France) Thomas Cazes-Carrère (France) Romain Jouan	6–7^{(5–7)}, 7–6^{(7–5)}, [10–6]
Win	4–4	Oct 2008	Spain F39, Sabadell	Futures	Clay	(Spain) Íñigo Cervantes Huegun	(Spain) David Ollivier Baquero (Spain) Carlos Rexach Itoiz	7–5, 3–6, [10–7]
Win	5–4	Nov 2008	Spain F42, Las Palmas	Futures	Hard	(Spain) Andoni Vivanco-Guzmán	(Spain) Agustín Boje-Ordóñez (Spain) Ignacio Coll Riudavets	6–3, 6–3
Win	6–4	Jan 2009	Spain F1, Ciutadella de Menorca	Futures	Clay	(Spain) Íñigo Cervantes Huegun	(Jamaica) Dustin Brown (Germany) Peter Steinberger	6–3, 7–5
Win	7–4	Mar 2009	Spain F10, Castelldefels	Futures	Clay	(Spain) Marc Fornell Mestres	(Italy) Stefano Ianni (Italy) Mattia Livraghi	6–4, 3–6, [10–5]
Win	8–4	Mar 2009	Spain F11, Zaragoza	Futures	Clay (i)	(Spain) Ignacio Coll Riudavets	(Spain) Agustín Boje-Ordóñez (Spain) Andoni Vivanco-Guzmán	7–6^{(7–1)}, 6–4
Win	9–4	May 2009	Spain F14, Vic	Futures	Clay	(Spain) José Antonio Sánchez de Luna	(Spain) Pedro Clar Rosselló (Spain) Jordi Marsé-Vidri	7–6^{(9–7)}, 6–0
Win	10–4	May 2009	Spain F15, Balaguer	Futures	Clay	(Spain) José Antonio Sánchez de Luna	(Spain) Marc Fornell Mestres (Spain) Jordi Marsé-Vidri	5–7, 7–6^{(7–0)}, [10–5]
Win	11–4	May 2009	Spain F18, Telde	Futures	Clay	(Spain) Marc Fornell Mestres	(Spain) Sergio Gutiérrez Ferrol (Spain) Rafael Mazón-Hernández	6–3, 6–4
Win	12–4	Jun 2009	Spain F20, La Palma	Futures	Hard	(Spain) Adrián Menéndez Maceiras	(Spain) Javier Martí (Spain) Andoni Vivanco-Guzmán	6–4, 6–2
Loss	12–5	Jul 2009	Spain F24, Gandia	Futures	Clay	(Spain) Jordi Samper Montaña	(Spain) Carlos Calderón Rodríguez (Spain) José Checa Calvo	6–7^{(5–7)}, 3–6
Win	13–5	Aug 2009	Spain F29, Santander	Futures	Clay	(Spain) Carlos Calderón Rodríguez	(Spain) Rafael Mazón-Hernández (Spain) Santos Sánchez-Patiño	6–1, 6–1
Win	14–5	Aug 2009	Romania F15, Brașov	Futures	Clay	(Spain) Carlos Calderón Rodríguez	(Romania) Marius Copil (Canada) Vasek Pospisil	7–5, 6–7^{(2–7)}, [12–10]
Win	15–5	Sep 2009	Bulgaria F7, Dobrich	Futures	Clay	(Spain) Carlos Calderón Rodríguez	(Bulgaria) Dimitar Kuzmanov (Bulgaria) Tzvetan Mihov	6–7^{(1–7)}, 6–3, [10–3]
Win	16–5	Nov 2009	Spain F37, Vilafranca	Futures	Clay	(Spain) Ignacio Coll Riudavets	(Spain) Jordi Marsé-Vidri (Australia) Allen Perel	5–7, 6–0, [10–6]
Win	17–5	Dec 2009	Khanty-Mansiysk, Russia	Challenger	Hard (i)	(Spain) Marcel Granollers	(Russia) Evgeny Kirillov (Russia) Andrey Kuznetsov	6–3, 6–2
Win	18–5	Feb 2010	Egypt F1, Giza	Futures	Clay	(Germany) Denis Gremelmayr	(Egypt) Karim Maamoun (Egypt) Sherif Sabry	6–4, 7–5
Loss	18–6	Feb 2010	Egypt F2, Giza	Futures	Clay	(Italy) Matteo Marrai	(Egypt) Karim Maamoun (Egypt) Sherif Sabry	7–5, 4–6, [8–10]
Win	19–6	Feb 2010	Egypt F3, Giza	Futures	Clay	(Spain) Guillermo Alcaide	(Egypt) Karim Maamoun (Egypt) Sherif Sabry	3–6, 6–3, [11–9]
Win	20–6	Mar 2010	Spain F8, Sabadell	Futures	Clay	(Spain) Ignacio Coll Riudavets	(Belgium) Bart Govaerts (Spain) Jordi Samper Montaña	7–5, 6–3
Win	21–6	Mar 2010	Spain F9, Badalona	Futures	Clay	(Spain) Ignacio Coll Riudavets	(Russia) Ivan Nedelko (Spain) Roberto Rodríguez Alonso	6–4, 6–2
Win	22–6	Apr 2010	Turkey F5, Antalya	Futures	Clay	(Spain) Ignacio Coll Riudavets	(Serbia) Ivan Bjelica (Serbia) Miljan Zekić	6–2, 5–7, [10–7]
Win	23–6	May 2010	Great Britain F7, Newcastle	Futures	Clay	(Spain) Ignacio Coll Riudavets	(United Kingdom) Maniel Bains (United Kingdom) Marcus Willis	6–1, 6–4
Loss	23–7	May 2010	Spain F17, Valldoreix	Futures	Clay	(Spain) Juan Lizariturry	(Spain) David Cañudas-Fernández (Spain) Marc Fornell Mestres	3–6, 6–7^{(2–7)}
Loss	23–8	Jun 2010	Morocco F4, Kenitra	Futures	Clay	(Spain) Jordi Samper Montaña	(Spain) Carlos Boluda-Purkiss (Spain) Pedro Rico García	3–6, 4–6
Win	24–8	Jul 2010	Pozoblanco, Spain	Challenger	Hard	(Spain) Marcel Granollers	(United States) Brian Battistone (Sweden) Filip Prpic	6–4, 4–6, [10–4]
Loss	24–9	Sep 2010	Todi, Italy	Challenger	Clay	(Spain) Marcel Granollers	(Italy) Flavio Cipolla (Italy) Alessio di Mauro	1–6, 4–6
Win	25–9	Sep 2010	Morocco F7, Tanger	Futures	Clay	(Spain) Carlos Poch Gradin	(Austria) Philipp Oswald (Netherlands) Tim van Terheijden	6–2, 6–3
Loss	25–10	Oct 2010	Tarragona, Spain	Challenger	Clay	(Spain) Pablo Andújar	(Spain) Guillermo Olaso (Spain) Pere Riba	6–7^{(2–7)}, 6–4, [5–10]
Loss	25–11	Oct 2010	Spain F38, Sant Cugat	Futures	Clay	(Spain) Carlos Calderón Rodríguez	(Spain) Miguel Ángel López Jaén (Spain) Pablo Santos González	1–6, 3–6
Loss	25–12	Jan 2011	Spain F2, Mallorca	Futures	Clay	(Spain) Marc Fornell Mestres	(Spain) José Checa Calvo (Spain) Carlos Poch Gradin	w/o
Win	26–12	May 2011	Spain F17, Getxo	Futures	Clay	(Spain) Carlos Calderón Rodríguez	(Spain) Iván Arenas-Gualda (Spain) Antonio García Sánchez	6–3, 6–3
Loss	26–13	Jun 2011	Romania F3, Craiova	Futures	Clay	(Spain) Ignacio Coll Riudavets	(Romania) Teodor-Dacian Crăciun (Romania) Andrei Dăescu	6–2, 6–7^{(0–7)}, [8–10]
Loss	26–14	Sep 2011	Seville, Spain	Challenger	Clay	(Spain) Adrián Menéndez Maceiras	(Spain) Daniel Muñoz de la Nava (Spain) Rubén Ramírez Hidalgo	4–6, 7–6^{(7–4)}, [11–13]
Loss	26–15	Oct 2011	Spain F36, Córdoba	Futures	Hard	(Portugal) João Sousa	(Spain) Miguel Ángel López Jaén (Spain) Gabriel Trujillo Soler	4–6, 4–6
Win	27–15	Oct 2011	Spain F39, Vilafranca	Futures	Clay	(Spain) Roberto Carballés Baena	(Spain) Miguel Ángel López Jaén (Spain) Gabriel Trujillo Soler	3–6, 6–3, [11–9]
Win	28–15	Jan 2012	Egypt F1, Cairo	Futures	Clay	(Spain) Jordi Samper Montaña	(Egypt) Omar Hedayet (Egypt) Karim-Mohamed Maamoun	2–6, 7–6^{(7–3)}, [10–6]
Win	29–15	Feb 2012	Egypt F2, Cairo	Futures	Clay	(Spain) Jordi Samper Montaña	(Syria) Marc Abdelnour (Syria) Issam Haitham Taweel	6–4, 6–2
Loss	29–16	Feb 2012	Meknes, Morocco	Challenger	Clay	(Spain) Iván Navarro	(Spain) Adrián Menéndez Maceiras (Czech Republic) Jaroslav Pospíšil	3–6, 6–3, [8–10]
Loss	29–17	May 2012	Athens, Greece	Challenger	Hard	(Greece) Alexandros Jakupovic	(Germany) Andre Begemann (Australia) Jordan Kerr	2–6, 3–6
Loss	29–18	Jun 2012	Spain F18, Palma del Río	Futures	Hard	(Spain) Andoni Vivanco-Guzmán	(Republic of Ireland) James Cluskey (France) Fabrice Martin	3–6, 4–6
Win	30–18	Sep 2012	Spain F30, Seville	Futures	Clay	(Spain) Jordi Samper Montaña	(Spain) Jordi Marsé-Vidri (Spain) Carlos Poch Gradin	6–4, 6–0
Win	31–18	Jan 2013	Turkey F3, Antalya	Futures	Hard	(Spain) Pablo Carreño Busta	(Russia) Vitaliy Kachanovskiy (Russia) Andrei Levine	7–6^{(7–4)}, 6–4
Win	32–18	Mar 2013	Spain F4, Cartagena	Futures	Clay	(Spain) Jordi Samper Montaña	(Spain) Miguel Ángel López Jaén (Spain) Jordi Marsé-Vidri	6–2, 6–2
Win	33–18	Mar 2013	Spain F5, Reus	Futures	Clay	(Spain) Jordi Samper Montaña	(Venezuela) Jordi Muñoz Abreu (Spain) Andoni Vivanco-Guzmán	6–7^{(5–7)}, 7–6^{(7–3)}, [10–4]
Win	34–18	Mar 2013	Turkey F11, Antalya	Futures	Hard	(Spain) Guillermo Olaso	(Sweden) Patrik Brydolf (Austria) Michael Linzer	6–4, 6–1
Loss	34–19	Apr 2013	Spain F9, Villajoyosa	Futures	Carpet	(Spain) Eduard Esteve Lobato	(Spain) Oriol Roca Batalla (Spain) Andoni Vivanco-Guzmán	4–6, 6–3, [8–10]
Loss	34–20	Sep 2013	Meknes, Morocco	Challenger	Clay	(Spain) Jordi Samper Montaña	(Italy) Alessandro Giannessi (Italy) Gianluca Naso	5–7, 6–7^{(3–7)}
Win	35–20	Sep 2013	Kenitra, Morocco	Challenger	Clay	(Spain) Jordi Samper Montaña	(Japan) Taro Daniel (Russia) Alexander Rumyantsev	6–4, 6–4
Win	36–20	Mar 2014	Croatia F4, Poreč	Futures	Clay	(Spain) Oriol Roca Batalla	(Bulgaria) Tihomir Grozdanov (Croatia) Duje Kekez	6–4, 6–1
Win	37–20	Jun 2014	Fürth, Germany	Challenger	Clay	(Spain) Jordi Samper Montaña	(Spain) Adrián Menéndez Maceiras (Spain) Rubén Ramírez Hidalgo	7–6^{(7–1)}, 6–2
Loss	37–21	Sep 2014	Meknes, Morocco	Challenger	Clay	(Spain) Jordi Samper Montaña	(Chile) Hans Podlipnik Castillo (Italy) Stefano Travaglia	2–6, 7–6^{(7–4)}, [7–10]
Loss	37–22	Sep 2014	Kenitra, Morocco	Challenger	Clay	(Spain) Jordi Samper Montaña	(Croatia) Dino Marcan (Croatia) Antonio Šančić	1–6, 6–7^{(3–7)}
Win	38–22	Oct 2014	Spain F29, Sabadell	Futures	Clay	(Spain) Eduard Esteve Lobato	(Spain) Juan Lizariturry (Spain) Oriol Roca Batalla	4–6, 6–3, [10–6]
Win	39–22	Oct 2014	Spain F32, Madrid	Futures	Hard	(Spain) Oriol Roca Batalla	(Spain) David Pérez Sanz (Spain) Ricardo Villacorta-Alonso	7–6^{(7–4)}, 6–0
Win	40–22	May 2015	Spain F13, Valldoreix	Futures	Clay	(Spain) Oriol Roca Batalla	(Spain) Sergio Martos Gornés (Spain) Pol Toledo Bagué	7–5, 6–2
Win	41–22	Jun 2015	Italy F14, Naples	Futures	Clay	(Netherlands) Mark Vervoort	(Italy) Filippo Baldi (Spain) Eduard Esteve Lobato	6–4, 7–5
Loss	41–23	Jun 2015	Italy F15, Basilicanova	Futures	Clay	(Netherlands) Mark Vervoort	(Germany) Maximilian Marterer (Germany) Daniel Masur	2–6, 6–1, [4–10]
Win	42–23	Sep 2015	Spain F28, Oviedo	Futures	Clay	(Spain) Pedro Martínez	(France) Adrien Puget (France) Xavier Pujo	7–5, 6–4
Win	43–23	Sep 2015	Kenitra, Morocco	Challenger	Clay	(Spain) Oriol Roca Batalla	(Germany) Kevin Krawietz (Germany) Maximilian Marterer	3–6, 7–6^{(7–4)}, [10–8]
Win	44–23	Oct 2015	Pune, India	Challenger	Hard	(Spain) Adrián Menéndez Maceiras	(Austria) Maximilian Neuchrist (India) Divij Sharan	3–6, 7–6^{(7–4)}, [10–8]
Win	45–23	Nov 2015	Morocco F6, Rabat	Futures	Clay	(Spain) Eduard Esteve Lobato	(Egypt) Karim Hossam (Italy) Tommaso Lago	6–4, 6–4
Win	46–23	Sep 2016	Spain F31, Seville	Futures	Clay	(Spain) David Vega Hernández	(Spain) Eduard Esteve Lobato (Spain) Sergio Martos Gornés	6–2, 7–5
Win	47–23	Oct 2016	Spain F33, Madrid	Futures	Hard	(Spain) Carlos Gómez-Herrera	(Spain) Carlos Boluda-Purkiss (Spain) Miguel Semmler	6–1, 5–3 ret.
Win	48–23	Feb 2017	Spain F3, Peguera	Futures	Clay	(Spain) Pedro Martínez	(Italy) Filippo Leonardi (Italy) Stefano Travaglia	6–1, 6–3
Win	49–23	Feb 2017	Spain F4, Peguera	Futures	Clay	(Spain) Pedro Martínez	(Spain) Sergio Martos Gornés (Chile) Cristóbal Saavedra Corvalán	6–3, 6–4
Win	50–23	Mar 2017	Spain F7, Xàbia	Futures	Clay	(Spain) Pedro Martínez	(Russia) Ivan Gakhov (Spain) Sergio Martos Gornés	6–2, 6–2
Loss	50–24	Jul 2017	Spain F23, Xàtiva	Futures	Clay	(Spain) Eduard Esteve Lobato	(Spain) Marc Fornell Mestres (Spain) Sergio Martos Gornés	3–6, 2–6
Loss	50–25	Oct 2017	Spain F33, Riba-roja de Túria	Futures	Clay	(Spain) Guillermo Olaso	(Spain) Javier Barranco Cosano (Italy) Raúl Brancaccio	7–5, 3–6, [7–10]
Win	51–25	Jan 2018	Bangkok, Thailand	Challenger	Hard	(Spain) Marcel Granollers	(Czech Republic) Zdeněk Kolář (Portugal) Gonçalo Oliveira	6–3, 7–6^{(8–6)}
Win	52–25	Feb 2018	Burnie, Australia	Challenger	Hard	(Spain) Marcel Granollers	(United States) Evan King (United States) Max Schnur	7–6^{(10–8)}, 6–2
Win	53–25	May 2018	Glasgow, Great Britain	Challenger	Hard (i)	(Spain) Guillermo Olaso	(United Kingdom) Scott Clayton (United Kingdom) Jonny O'Mara	6–1, 7–5
Loss	53–26	Jul 2018	Winnipeg, Canada	Challenger	Hard	(Spain) Marcel Granollers	(Switzerland) Marc-Andrea Hüsler (Netherlands) Sem Verbeek	7–6^{(7–5)}, 3–6, [12–14]
Win	54–26	Jul 2018	Binghamton, USA	Challenger	Hard	(Spain) Marcel Granollers	(Colombia) Alejandro Gómez (Brazil) Caio Silva	7–6^{(7–2)}, 6–4
Win	55–26	Aug 2018	Portorož, Slovenia	Challenger	Hard	(Czech Republic) Lukáš Rosol	(Serbia) Nikola Ćaćić (Austria) Lucas Miedler	7–5, 6–3
Loss	55–27	Sep 2018	Mallorca, Spain	Challenger	Hard	(United Kingdom) Daniel Evans	(Uruguay) Ariel Behar (Spain) Enrique López Pérez	w/o
Win	56–27	Sep 2018	Seville, Spain	Challenger	Clay	(Spain) Pedro Martínez	(Spain) Daniel Gimeno Traver (Spain) Ricardo Ojeda Lara	6–0, 6–2
Loss	56–28	Sep 2018	Tiburon, USA	Challenger	Hard	(Spain) Pedro Martínez	(Mexico) Hans Hach (Australia) Luke Saville	3–6, 2–6
Loss	56–29	Apr 2019	Alicante, Spain	Challenger	Clay	(Spain) Pedro Martínez	(Brazil) Thomaz Bellucci (Argentina) Guillermo Durán	6–2, 5–7, [5–10]
Win	57–29	May 2019	Braga, Portugal	Challenger	Clay	(Brazil) Fabrício Neis	(Belgium) Kimmer Coppejans (Czech Republic) Zdeněk Kolář	6–4, 6–3
Win	58–29	Sep 2019	Seville, Spain	Challenger	Clay	(Spain) Pedro Martínez	(Belgium) Kimmer Coppejans (Spain) Sergio Martos Gornés	7–5, 6–4
Loss	58–30	Sep 2019	Florence, Italy	Challenger	Clay	(Spain) Pedro Martínez	(Switzerland) Luca Margaroli (Canada) Adil Shamasdin	5–7, 7–6^{(8–6)}, [12–14]
Win	59–30	Oct 2020	Marbella, Spain	Challenger	Clay	(Spain) Pedro Martínez	(Venezuela) Luis David Martínez (Brazil) Fernando Romboli	6–3, 6–4
Win	60–30	Dec 2020	M15 Torelló, Spain	World Tennis Tour	Hard	(Spain) Oriol Roca Batalla	(Switzerland) Leandro Riedi (France) Arthur Cazaux	7–6^{(8–6)}, 3–6, [11–9]
Win	61–30	Jan 2021	M15 Cairo, Egypt	World Tennis Tour	Clay	(Spain) Pol Toledo Bagué	(Russia) Ivan Gakhov (Austria) Lukas Krainer	5–7, 6–3, [10–3]
