= Morocco Tennis Tour – Kenitra =

- 2015 Morocco Tennis Tour – Kenitra

ATP Challenger Tour
- Event name: Morocco Tennis Tour – Kenitra
- Location: Kenitra, Morocco
- Category: ATP Challenger Tour
- Surface: Red clay
- Draw: 32S/29Q/16D
- Prize money: €30,000+H
- Website: Website

The Morocco Tennis Tour – Kenitra is a professional tennis tournament played on outdoor red clay courts. It is currently part of the ATP Challenger Tour. It is held annually in Kenitra, Morocco, since 2013.

== Past finals ==
=== Singles ===
Year	Champion	Runner-up	Score	Ref.
2016	(Germany) Maximilian Marterer	(Egypt) Mohamed Safwat	6–2, 6–4	
2015	(Spain) Roberto Carballés Baena	(Spain) Oriol Roca Batalla	6–1, 5–1 ret.	
2014	(Spain) Daniel Gimeno Traver	(Spain) Albert Ramos	6–3, 6–4	
2013	(Austria) Dominic Thiem	(Russia) Teymuraz Gabashvili	7–6^{(7–4)}, 5–1 ret.	

=== Doubles ===
Year	Champions	Runners-up	Score
2016	(Germany) Kevin Krawietz (Germany) Maximilian Marterer	(Belarus) Uladzimir Ignatik (Austria) Michael Linzer	7–6^{(8–6)}, 4–6, [10–6]
2015	(Spain) Gerard Granollers (Spain) Oriol Roca Batalla	(Germany) Kevin Krawietz (Germany) Maximilian Marterer	3–6, 7–6^{(7–4)}, [10–8]
2014	(Croatia) Dino Marcan (Croatia) Antonio Šančić	(Spain) Gerard Granollers (Spain) Jordi Samper Montaña	6–1, 7–6^{(7–3)}
2013	(Spain) Gerard Granollers (Spain) Jordi Samper Montaña	(Japan) Taro Daniel (Russia) Alexander Rumyantsev	6–4, 6–4
