= Jordi Samper Montaña =

Spanish tennis player (born 1990)

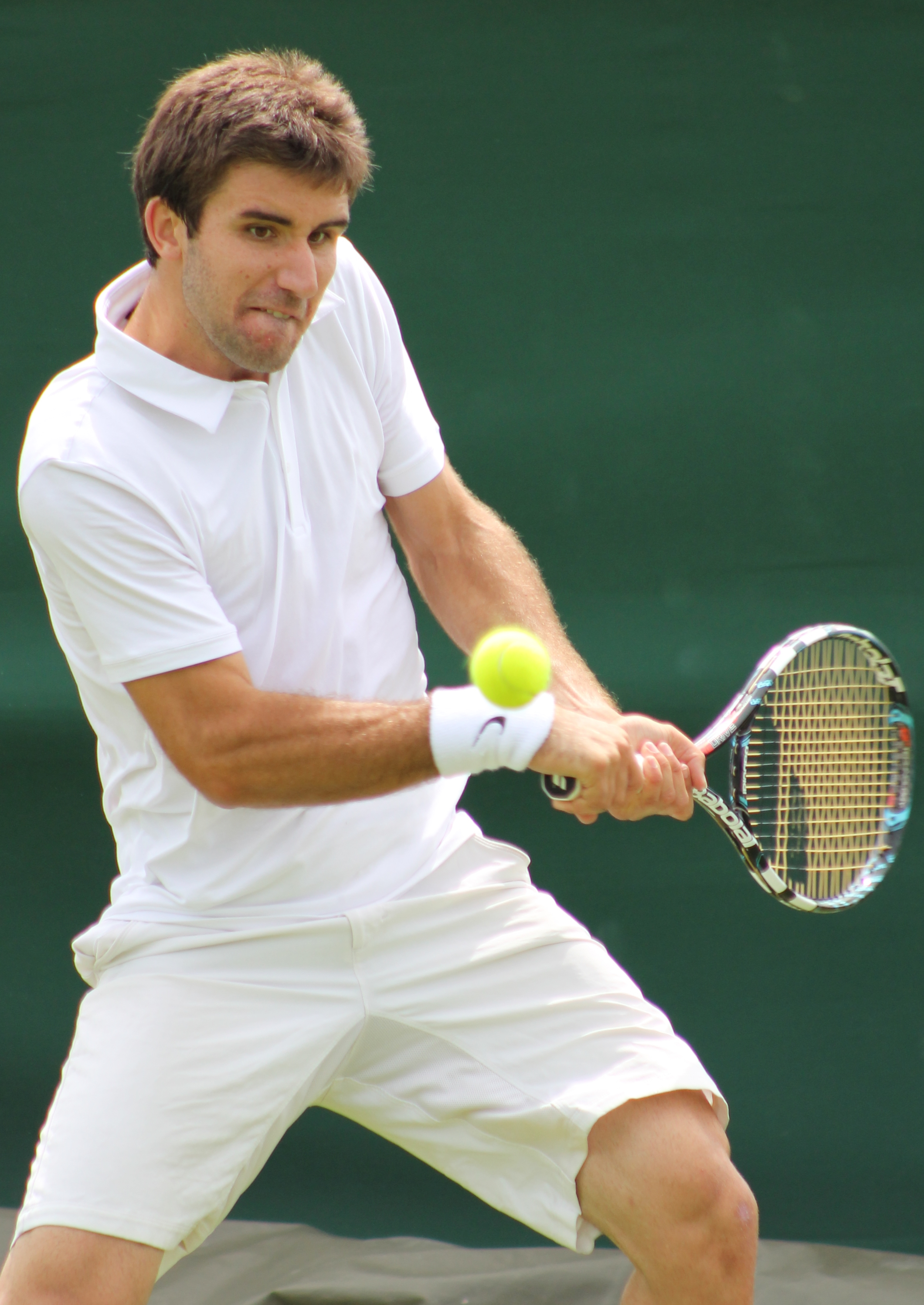
- Samper in 2014
- Country (sports): Spain
- Born: 23 April 1990 (age 35) Barcelona, Spain
- Plays: Right-Handed
- Prize money: US$324,956

Singles
- Career record: 0–2
- Career titles: 0
- Highest ranking: No. 179 (22 August 2016)

Grand Slam singles results
- Australian Open: Q2 (2016)
- French Open: 1R (2016)
- Wimbledon: Q1 (2014, 2016)
- US Open: Q1 (2015)

Doubles
- Career record: 0–0
- Career titles: 0
- Highest ranking: No. 227 (23 September 2013)

Jordi Samper Montaña (Spanish pronunciation: [ˈɟʝoɾði samˈpeɾ monˈtaɲa]; born 23 April 1990) is a Spanish tennis player playing on the ATP Challenger Tour. On 22 August 2016, he reached his highest ATP singles ranking of No. 179 and his highest doubles ranking of No. 227 achieved on 23 September 2013.

His only qualification for a Grand Slam tournament was at the French Open in 2016, where he lost in straight sets to French wild card Mathias Bourgue in the first round.

His younger brother, Sergi, is a professional footballer who played for FC Barcelona.

== Tour finals ==
=== Singles ===
Legend
Grand Slam (0)
ATP Masters Series (0)
ATP Tour (0)
Challengers (0–1)

Outcome	No.	Date	Tournament	Surface	Opponent	Score
Runner-up	1.	14 August 2016	Trnava	Clay	(Belgium) Steve Darcis	3–6, 4–6

=== Doubles ===
Legend
Grand Slam (0)
ATP Masters Series (0)
ATP Tour (0)
Challengers (2–4)

Outcome	No.	Date	Tournament	Surface	Partner	Opponents	Score
Runner-up	1.	15 September 2013	Meknes	Clay	(Spain) Gerard Granollers	(Italy) Alessandro Giannessi (Italy) Gianluca Naso	5–7, 6–7 ^{(3–7)}
Winner	1.	22 September 2013	Kenitra	Clay	(Spain) Gerard Granollers	(Japan) Taro Daniel (Russia) Alexander Rumyantsev	6–4, 6–4
Winner	2.	9 June 2014	Fürth	Clay	(Spain) Gerard Granollers	(Spain) Adrián Menéndez-Maceiras (Spain) Rubén Ramírez Hidalgo	7–6 ^{(7–1)}, 6–2
Runner-up	2.	21 September 2014	Meknes	Clay	(Spain) Gerard Granollers	(Chile) Hans Podlipnik-Castillo (Italy) Stefano Travaglia	2–6, 7–6 ^{(7–4)}, [7–10]
Runner-up	3.	28 September 2014	Kenitra	Clay	(Spain) Gerard Granollers	(Croatia) Dino Marcan (Croatia) Antonio Šančić	1–6, 6–7 ^{(3–7)}
Runner-up	4.	16 November 2014	Guayaquil	Clay	(Spain) Pere Riba	(Argentina) Máximo González (Argentina) Guido Pella	2–6, 7–6^{(7–3)}, [10–5]
