= Mehdi Jdi =

Moroccan tennis player

- Country (sports): Morocco
- Born: 13 December 1988 (age 37)
- Prize money: $18,623

Singles
- Career record: 0–2 (at ATP Tour level, Grand Slam level, and in Davis Cup)
- Career titles: 0
- Highest ranking: No. 906 (16 June 2014)
- Current ranking: No. 1273 (28 November 2016)

Doubles
- Career record: 0–1 (at ATP Tour level, Grand Slam level, and in Davis Cup)
- Career titles: 0
- Highest ranking: No. 1229 (4 May 2015)
- Last updated on: 28 November 2016.

Mehdi Jdi (born 13 December 1988) is a Moroccan tennis player.

Jdi has a career high ATP singles ranking of 906 achieved on 16 June 2014. He also has a career high ATP doubles ranking of 1229 achieved on 4 May 2015.

Jdi made his ATP main draw debut at the 2015 Grand Prix Hassan II in the doubles draw partnering Max Mirnyi.
