= 2012 Morocco Tennis Tour – Casablanca – Doubles =

Casablanca – Doubles
- 2012 Morocco Tennis Tour – Casablanca

Final
- Champions: (Italy) Walter Trusendi; (Italy) Matteo Viola
- Runners-up: (Russia) Evgeny Donskoy; (Russia) Andrey Kuznetsov
- Score: 1–6, 7–6^{(7–5)}, [10–3]

Events
Singles	Doubles
← 2011 ·	Morocco Tennis Tour – Casablanca	· 2013 →

Guillermo Alcaide and Adrián Menéndez were the defending champions. Alcaide did not participate. Menéndez partnered with Jaroslav Pospíšil, losing in the quarterfinals. Walter Trusendi and Matteo Viola won the title defeating Evgeny Donskoy and Andrey Kuznetsov 1–6, 7–6^{(7–5)}, [10–3] in the final.

== Seeds ==
1. (Spain) Adrián Menéndez / (Czech Republic) Jaroslav Pospíšil (quarterfinals)
2. (Italy) Alessio di Mauro / (Italy) Alessandro Motti (first round)
3. (Spain) Daniel Muñoz de la Nava / (Italy) Simone Vagnozzi (semifinals)
4. (Belarus) Aliaksandr Bury / (Poland) Mateusz Kowalczyk (semifinals)

== Draw ==
=== Key ===
- Q = Qualifier
- WC = Wild card
- LL = Lucky loser
- Alt = Alternate
- ITF = ITF entry
- PR = Protected ranking
- SR = Special ranking
- SE = Special exempt
- JE = Junior exempt
- JR = Junior Accelerator Programme entrant
- CO = College Accelerator Programme entrant
- NG = Next Gen Accelerator Program entrant
- w/o = Walkover
- r = Retired
- d = Defaulted

=== Draw ===
First round

Quarterfinals

Semifinals

Final

1
- (Spain) A Menéndez
- (Czech Republic) J Pospíšil
6
4
[10]

- (Spain) I Cervantes Huegun
- (Spain) G Olaso
1
6
[5]

1
- (Spain) A Menéndez
- (Czech Republic) J Pospíšil
3
4

- (Spain) P Carreño Busta
- (Spain) G Granollers Pujol
0
3

- (Russia) E Donskoy
- (Russia) A Kuznetsov
6
6

- (Russia) E Donskoy
- (Russia) A Kuznetsov
6
6

- (Russia) E Donskoy
- (Russia) A Kuznetsov
6
5
[10]

4
- (Belarus) A Bury
- (Poland) M Kowalczyk
w/o

4
- (Belarus) A Bury
- (Poland) M Kowalczyk
2
7
[6]

- (Czech Republic) J Hájek
- (Czech Republic) I Minář

4
- (Belarus) A Bury
- (Poland) M Kowalczyk
6
6

WC
(Morocco) Mehdi Jdi
(Morocco) Reda Karakhi
0
3

- (Czech Republic) D Lojda
- (Italy) G Naso
1
2

- (Czech Republic) D Lojda
- (Italy) G Naso
6
6

- (Russia) E Donskoy
- (Russia) A Kuznetsov
6
6^{5}
[3]

- (Slovenia) A Bedene
- (Portugal) J Sousa
6^{9}
3

- (Italy) W Trusendi
- (Italy) M Viola
1
7^{7}
[10]

WC
(Algeria) L Ouahab
(Morocco) Younès Rachidi
7^{11}
6

WC
(Algeria) L Ouahab
(Morocco) Y Rachidi
1
4

- (Slovakia) P Červenák
- (Czech Republic) M Kližan
6
6^{7}
[7]

3
- (Spain) D Muñoz de la Nava
- (Italy) S Vagnozzi
6
6

3
- (Spain) D Muñoz de la Nava
- (Italy) S Vagnozzi
3
7^{9}
[10]

3
- (Spain) D Muñoz de la Nava
- (Italy) S Vagnozzi
6^{6}
7
[7]

- (Italy) W Trusendi
- (Italy) M Viola
4
6
[12]

- (Italy) W Trusendi
- (Italy) M Viola
7^{8}
5
[10]

WC
- (Morocco) Yassine Idmbarek
- (Morocco) M Saber
6
2
[10]

- (Italy) W Trusendi
- (Italy) M Viola
4
6
[10]

- (Croatia) D Marcan
- (Croatia) F Škugor
6
6

- (Croatia) D Marcan
- (Croatia) F Škugor
6
3
[6]

2
- (Italy) A di Mauro
- (Italy) A Motti
1
4
