= 2013 Morocco Tennis Tour – Casablanca – Doubles =

Casablanca – Doubles
- 2013 Morocco Tennis Tour – Casablanca

Final
- Champions: (Italy) Claudio Grassi; (Italy) Riccardo Ghedin
- Runners-up: (Germany) Gero Kretschmer; (Germany) Alexander Satschko
- Score: 6–4, 6–4

Events
Singles	Doubles
← 2012 ·	Morocco Tennis Tour – Casablanca	· 2014 →

Walter Trusendi and Matteo Viola were the defending champions but chose not to participate.
Italians Claudio Grassi and Riccardo Ghedin won the title over Germans Gero Kretschmer and Alexander Satschko 6–4, 6–4

== Seeds ==
1. (Germany) Gero Kretschmer / (Germany) Alexander Satschko (final)
2. (Italy) Claudio Grassi / (Italy) Riccardo Ghedin (champions)
3. (Italy) Stefano Ianni / (Czech Republic) Jaroslav Pospíšil (semifinals)
4. (Italy) Alessio di Mauro / (Italy) Alessandro Motti (semifinals)

== Draw ==
=== Key ===
- Q = Qualifier
- WC = Wild card
- LL = Lucky loser
- Alt = Alternate
- SE = Special exempt
- PR = Protected ranking
- ITF = ITF entry
- JE = Junior exempt
- w/o = Walkover
- r = Retired
- d = Defaulted
- SR = Special ranking

=== Draw ===
First round

Quarterfinals

Semifinals

Final

1
- (Germany) G Kretschmer
- (Germany) A Satschko
6
6

WC
(Morocco) Khalid Allouch
(Morocco) Othmane Lachhab
2
1

1
- (Germany) G Kretschmer
- (Germany) A Satschko
6
6

- (Morocco) Mohamed Adnaoui
- (Morocco) Y Idmbarek
1
4

- (Italy) F Borgo
- (Italy) M Bortolotti
1
3

- (Italy) Francesco Borgo
- (Italy) M Bortolotti
6
6

1
- (Germany) G Kretschmer
- (Germany) A Satschko
6
6

4
- (Italy) A di Mauro
- (Italy) A Motti
6
6

4
- (Italy) A di Mauro
- (Italy) A Motti
2
2

- (Morocco) Y Rachidi
- (Egypt) S Sabry
3
4

4
- (Italy) A di Mauro
- (Italy) A Motti
6
3
[11]

- (Austria) S Bader
- (United Kingdom) D Walsh
6
2
[10]

- (Austria) S Bader
- (United Kingdom) D Walsh
4
6
[9]

- (Italy) F Cipolla
- (Italy) S Vagnozzi
3
6
[8]

1
- (Germany) G Kretschmer
- (Germany) A Satschko
4
4

- (Italy) L Giustino
- (Spain) E López Pérez
6
6

2
- (Italy) R Ghedin
- (Italy) C Grassi
6
6

(Morocco) Omar Erramy
(Morocco) Reda Karakhi
3
2

- (Italy) L Giustino
- (Spain) E López Pérez
4
1

- (Austria) G Melzer
- (Belgium) Y Mertens
4
6
[4]

3
- (Italy) S Ianni
- (Czech Republic) J Pospíšil
6
6

3
- (Italy) S Ianni
- (Czech Republic) J Pospíšil
6
0
[10]

3
- (Italy) S Ianni
- (Czech Republic) J Pospíšil
6
3
[9]

- (Serbia) F Krajinović
- (Serbia) G Tošić
3
7
[10]

2
- (Italy) R Ghedin
- (Italy) C Grassi
3
6
[11]

- (Romania) V Crivoi
- (Algeria) L Ouahab
6
5
[7]

- (Serbia) F Krajinović
- (Serbia) G Tošić
5
0

- (Italy) A Giannessi
- (Italy) G Naso
5
5

2
- (Italy) R Ghedin
- (Italy) C Grassi
7
6

2
- (Italy) R Ghedin
- (Italy) C Grassi
7
7
