= 2012 Morocco Tennis Tour – Casablanca – Singles =

Casablanca – Singles
- 2012 Morocco Tennis Tour – Casablanca

Final
- Champion: (Slovenia) Aljaž Bedene
- Runner-up: (France) Nicolas Devilder
- Score: 7–6^{(8–6)}, 7–6^{(7–4)}

Events
Singles	Doubles
← 2011 ·	Morocco Tennis Tour – Casablanca	· 2013 →

Evgeny Donskoy was the defending champion but lost in the first round.
Aljaž Bedene won the final after defeating Nicolas Devilder 7–6^{(8–6)}, 7–6^{(7–4)} in the final.

== Seeds ==
1. (Romania) Adrian Ungur (second round)
2. (Slovakia) Martin Kližan (quarterfinals)
3. (Russia) Evgeny Donskoy (first round)
4. (Spain) Daniel Muñoz de la Nava (quarterfinals)
5. (Italy) Matteo Viola (second round)
6. (Czech Republic) Jan Hájek (first round, retired due to a stiff neck)
7. (Spain) Pablo Carreño Busta (first round)
8. (Czech Republic) Ivo Minář (quarterfinals)

== Draw ==
=== Key ===
- Q = Qualifier
- WC = Wild card
- LL = Lucky loser
- Alt = Alternate
- SE = Special exempt
- PR = Protected ranking
- ITF = ITF entry
- JE = Junior exempt
- w/o = Walkover
- r = Retired
- d = Defaulted
- SR = Special ranking

=== Finals ===
Semifinals
(Slovenia) Aljaž Bedene	6	6
(Russia) Andrey Kuznetsov	3	4
(Spain) Íñigo Cervantes Huegun	6^{4}	6	3
Q	(France) Nicolas Devilder	7^{7}	3	6

Final
(Slovenia) Aljaž Bedene	7^{8}	7^{7}
Q	(France) Nicolas Devilder	6^{6}	6^{4}

=== Top half ===
First round
1	(Romania) A Ungur	2	6	6
(Italy) A di Mauro	6	3	4
WC	(Morocco) R Karakhi	0	0
Q	(Netherlands) M Middelkoop	6	6
(Spain) G Olaso	2	1
(Slovenia) A Bedene	6	6
(Spain) A Menéndez	6	1
6	(Czech Republic) J Hájek	1	0^{r}
4	(Spain) D Muñoz de la Nava	4	6	7^{7}
(Italy) S Vagnozzi	6	0	6^{1}
(Italy) G Naso	6	6
(Switzerland) M Lammer	3	3
(Portugal) J Sousa	6	6
WC	(Morocco) M Jdi	2	0
(Russia) A Kuznetsov	6	7
7	(Spain) P Carreño Busta	3	5

Second round
1	(Romania) A Ungur	6^{3}	1
Q	(Netherlands) M Middelkoop	7^{7}	6
(Slovenia) A Bedene	7	6
(Spain) A Menéndez	5	3
4	(Spain) D Muñoz de la Nava	3	7	6
(Italy) G Naso	6	5	0
(Portugal) J Sousa	3	3
(Russia) A Kuznetsov	6	6

Quarterfinals
Q	(Netherlands) M Middelkoop	3	3
(Slovenia) A Bedene	6	6
4	(Spain) D Muñoz de la Nava	7	5	1
(Russia) A Kuznetsov	5	7	6

Semifinals
(Slovenia) A Bedene	6	6
(Russia) A Kuznetsov	3	4

=== Bottom half ===
First round
8	(Czech Republic) I Minář	7	2	7^{7}
(Czech Republic) J Pospíšil	5	6	6^{4}
(Spain) G Granollers	2	2
Q	(Poland) M Gawron	6	6
(Germany) S Greul	7	6
Q	(Spain) S Gutiérrez-Ferrol	5	2
(Spain) I Cervantes Huegun	7^{7}	7
3	(Russia) E Donskoy	6^{5}	5
5	(Italy) M Viola	4	6	6
(Slovakia) P Červenák	6	4	4
LL	(Belgium) Alexandre Folie	2	5
Q	(France) N Devilder	6	7
WC	(Morocco) Y Rachidi	6^{2}	3
(Czech Republic) D Lojda	7^{7}	6
WC	(Morocco) Y Idmbarek	3	2
2	(Slovakia) M Kližan	6	6

Second round
8	(Czech Republic) I Minář	6	6
Q	(Poland) M Gawron	3	1
(Germany) S Greul	6	3	2
(Spain) I Cervantes Huegun	4	6	6
5	(Italy) M Viola	4	2
Q	(France) N Devilder	6	6
(Czech Republic) D Lojda	5	4
2	(Slovakia) M Kližan	7	6

Quarterfinals
8	(Czech Republic) I Minář	4	3
(Spain) I Cervantes Huegun	6	6
Q	(France) N Devilder	2	6	6
2	(Slovakia) M Kližan	6	3	1

Semifinals
(Spain) I Cervantes Huegun	6^{4}	6	3
Q	(France) N Devilder	7^{7}	3	6
