= 2013 Morocco Tennis Tour – Casablanca – Singles =

Casablanca – Singles
- 2013 Morocco Tennis Tour – Casablanca

Final
- Champion: (Austria) Dominic Thiem
- Runner-up: (Italy) Potito Starace
- Score: 6–2, 7–5

Events
Singles	Doubles
← 2012 ·	Morocco Tennis Tour – Casablanca	· 2014 →

Aljaž Bedene was the defending champion but chose not to compete.
Dominic Thiem won the title defeating Potito Starace in the final.

== Seeds ==
1. (Czech Republic) Jan Hájek (quarterfinals)
2. (Austria) Andreas Haider-Maurer (second round)
3. (Austria) Dominic Thiem (champion)
4. (Italy) Potito Starace (final)
5. (Slovenia) Blaž Rola (second round)
6. (Austria) Gerald Melzer (semifinals, retired)
7. (Italy) Flavio Cipolla (quarterfinals)
8. (Czech Republic) Jaroslav Pospíšil (first round)

== Draw ==
=== Key ===
- Q = Qualifier
- WC = Wild card
- LL = Lucky loser
- Alt = Alternate
- SE = Special exempt
- PR = Protected ranking
- ITF = ITF entry
- JE = Junior exempt
- w/o = Walkover
- r = Retired
- d = Defaulted
- SR = Special ranking

=== Finals ===
Semifinals
(Serbia) Filip Krajinović	2	1
3	(Austria) Dominic Thiem	6	6
4	(Italy) Potito Starace	6^{5}	6	2
6	(Austria) Gerald Melzer	7^{7}	2	1^{r}

Final
3	(Austria) Dominic Thiem	6	7
4	(Italy) Potito Starace	2	5

=== Top half ===
First round
1	(Czech Republic) J Hájek	6	7^{7}
(Italy) G Naso	3	6^{3}
(Spain) R Carballés Baena	6	6
(Italy) A Brizzi	1	2
(Russia) Alexander Rumantsev	1	0
(Serbia) F Krajinović	6	6
WC	(Morocco) Y Idmbarek	1	4
5	(Slovenia) B Rola	6	6
3	(Austria) D Thiem	6	6
Q	(Italy) C Grassi	4	3
(Italy) S Vagnozzi	6	4	6^{5}
Q	(Egypt) S Sabry	3	6	7^{7}
(Canada) S Diez	4	3
(Algeria) L Ouahab	6	6
(Italy) L Giustino	6	6
8	(Czech Republic) J Pospíšil	3	4

Second round
1	(Czech Republic) J Hájek	6	6
(Spain) R Carballés Baena	1	2
(Serbia) F Krajinović	7^{7}	7^{13}
5	(Slovenia) B Rola	6^{3}	6^{11}
3	(Austria) D Thiem	6	6
Q	(Egypt) S Sabry	1	3
(Algeria) L Ouahab	6	7
(Italy) L Giustino	1	5

Quarterfinals
1	(Czech Republic) J Hájek	6^{4}	r
(Serbia) F Krajinović	7^{7}
3	(Austria) D Thiem	6	0	6
(Algeria) L Ouahab	3	6	4

Semifinals
(Serbia) F Krajinović	2	1
3	(Austria) D Thiem	6	6

=== Bottom half ===
First round
7	(Italy) F Cipolla	7^{7}	7
(Bosnia and Herzegovina) D Džumhur	6^{4}	5
WC	(Morocco) H Khaddari	6^{7}	3
(Romania) V Crivoi	7^{9}	6
Q	(Austria) Marc Rath	6	1	0
(Italy) A di Mauro	3	6	6
(Belgium) Y Mertens	2	4
4	(Italy) P Starace	6	6
6	(Austria) G Melzer	6	7^{7}
WC	(Morocco) M Jdi	2	6^{4}
WC	(Morocco) Y Rachidi	2	6	2
Q	(Italy) R Ghedin	6	2	6
(Italy) A Giannessi	3	6	5
(Egypt) M Safwat	6	2	7
(Spain) E López Pérez	3	1
2	(Austria) A Haider-Maurer	6	6

Second round
7	(Italy) F Cipolla	6	6
(Romania) V Crivoi	2	4
(Italy) A di Mauro	3	0
(Italy) P Starace	6	6
6	(Austria) G Melzer	5	6	6
Q	(Italy) R Ghedin	7	1	2
(Egypt) M Safwat	6	6
2	(Austria) A Haider-Maurer	4	1

Quarterfinals
7	(Italy) F Cipolla	6^{7}	2
4	(Italy) P Starace	7^{9}	6
6	(Austria) G Melzer	6	6
(Egypt) M Safwat	4	4

Semifinals
4	(Italy) P Starace	6^{5}	6	2
6	(Austria) G Melzer	7^{7}	2	1^{r}
