= 2011 Morocco Tennis Tour – Casablanca – Doubles =

Casablanca – Doubles
- 2011 Morocco Tennis Tour – Casablanca

Final
- Champions: (Spain) Guillermo Alcaide (Spain) Adrián Menéndez
- Runners-up: (Portugal) Leonardo Tavares (Italy) Simone Vagnozzi
- Score: 6–2, 6–1

Events
Singles	Doubles
- Morocco Tennis Tour – Casablanca

Guillermo Alcaide and Adrián Menéndez won the title, defeating Leonardo Tavares and Simone Vagnozzi 6–2, 6–1 in the final.

== Seeds ==
1. (Portugal) Leonardo Tavares / (Italy) Simone Vagnozzi (final)
2. (Italy) Alessio di Mauro / (Italy) Alessandro Motti (first round)
3. (Spain) Gerard Granollers / (Spain) Guillermo Olaso (quarterfinals)
4. (Italy) Andrea Arnaboldi / (Slovakia) Martin Kližan (quarterfinals)

== Draw ==
Key

- Q = Qualifier
- WC = Wild card
- LL = Lucky loser
- Alt = Alternate
- ITF = ITF entry
- PR = Protected ranking
- SR = Special ranking
- SE = Special exempt
- JE = Junior exempt
- JR = Junior Accelerator Programme entrant
- CO = College Accelerator Programme entrant
- NG = Next Gen Accelerator Program entrant
- w/o = Walkover
- r = Retired
- d = Defaulted

=== Draw ===
First round
1	(Portugal) L Tavares (Italy) S Vagnozzi	6	6
(Serbia) N Ćirić (Croatia) A Veić	2	0
(Russia) A Kuznetsov (Latvia) D Pavlovs	6	7
WC	(Morocco) A Fattar (Morocco) Y Rachidi	1	6^{3}
4	(Italy) A Arnaboldi (Slovakia) M Kližan	6	7
(Morocco) R El Amrani (Morocco) T Ouahabi	1	5
(Italy) W Trusendi (Italy) M Viola
(Germany) Alexander Flock (Germany) D Gremelmayr	w/o
(Germany) S Greul (Germany) B Knittel	6	6
(France) N Devilder (France) O Patience	2	4
WC	(Morocco) Y Idmbarek (Morocco) H Khaddari	2	6^{4}
3	(Spain) G Granollers (Spain) G Olaso	6	7
PR	(Bosnia and Herzegovina) A Delić (Bosnia and Herzegovina) A Šetkić	6	6
(Romania) V Crivoi (Croatia) F Škugor	1	0
(Spain) G Alcaide (Spain) A Menéndez	6	3	[10]
2	(Italy) A di Mauro (Italy) A Motti	2	6	[7]

Quarterfinals
1	(Portugal) L Tavares (Italy) S Vagnozzi	5	6	[10]
(Russia) A Kuznetsov (Latvia) D Pavlovs	7	3	[7]
4	(Italy) A Arnaboldi (Slovakia) M Kližan	6	3	[8]
(Italy) W Trusendi (Italy) M Viola	2	6	[10]
(Germany) S Greul (Germany) B Knittel	3	6	[10]
3	(Spain) G Granollers (Spain) G Olaso	6	0	[3]
PR	(Bosnia and Herzegovina) A Delić (Bosnia and Herzegovina) A Šetkić	w/o
(Spain) G Alcaide (Spain) A Menéndez

Semifinals
1	(Portugal) L Tavares (Italy) S Vagnozzi	7	1	[10]
(Italy) W Trusendi (Italy) M Viola	5	6	[8]
(Germany) S Greul (Germany) B Knittel	3	2
(Spain) G Alcaide (Spain) A Menéndez	6	6

Final
1	(Portugal) L Tavares (Italy) S Vagnozzi	2	1
(Spain) G Alcaide (Spain) A Menéndez	6	6
