= 2015 Morocco Tennis Tour – Casablanca – Doubles =

Casablanca – Doubles
- 2015 Morocco Tennis Tour – Casablanca

Final
- Champion: (Lithuania) Laurynas Grigelis; (Romania) Adrian Ungur
- Runner-up: (Italy) Flavio Cipolla; (Italy) Alessandro Motti
- Score: 3–6, 6–2, [10–5].

Events
Singles	Doubles
← 2013 ·	Morocco Tennis Tour – Casablanca	· 2016 →

Claudio Grassi and Riccardo Ghedin were the defending champions, having won the title in 2013, but they lost in the first round to Laurynas Grigelis and Adrian Ungur, who eventually won the tournament, defeating Flavio Cipolla and Alessandro Motti in the final, 3–6, 6–2, [10–5].

== Seeds ==
1. (Germany) Martin Emmrich / (Sweden) Andreas Siljeström (first round)
2. (France) Fabrice Martin / (India) Purav Raja (semifinals)
3. (Italy) Riccardo Ghedin / (Germany) Claudio Grassi (first round)
4. (Italy) Flavio Cipolla / (Italy) Alessandro Motti (final)

== Draw ==
=== Key ===
- Q = Qualifier
- WC = Wild card
- LL = Lucky loser
- Alt = Alternate
- SE = Special exempt
- PR = Protected ranking
- ITF = ITF entry
- JE = Junior exempt
- w/o = Walkover
- r = Retired
- d = Defaulted
- SR = Special ranking

First round

Quarterfinals

Semifinals

Final

1
- (Germany) M Emmrich
- (Sweden) A Siljeström
4
6^{5}

- (Netherlands) W Koolhof
- (Netherlands) M Middelkoop
6
7^{7}

- (Netherlands) W Koolhof
- (Netherlands) M Middelkoop
7^{7}
6

WC
- (Morocco) A Ahouda
- (Morocco) Y Rachidi
3
4

- (Croatia) N Mektić
- (Croatia) F Škugor
6^{5}
4

- (Croatia) N Mektić
- (Croatia) F Škugor
6
6

- (Netherlands) W Koolhof
- (Netherlands) M Middelkoop
7^{8}
4
[5]

4
- (Italy) F Cipolla
- (Italy) A Motti
6
6

4
- (Italy) F Cipolla
- (Italy) A Motti
6^{6}
6
[10]

- (Belgium) J Cagnina
- (Belgium) G Gigounon
4
4

4
- (Italy) F Cipolla
- (Italy) A Motti
w/o

- (Egypt) M Safwat
- (United Kingdom) S Thornley
4
1

- (Bosnia and Herzegovina) M Bašić
- (Croatia) D Marcan

- (Bosnia and Herzegovina) M Bašić
- (Croatia) D Marcan
6
6

4
- (Italy) F Cipolla
- (Italy) A Motti
6
2
[5]

WC
(Morocco) Mohamed Adnaoui
(Morocco) Ayoub Chakrouni
3
1

- (Lithuania) L Grigelis
- (Romania) A Ungur
3
6
[10]

- (Spain) D Gimeno Traver
- (Spain) R Ramírez Hidalgo
6
6

- (Spain) D Gimeno Traver
- (Spain) R Ramírez Hidalgo
2
4

- (Lithuania) L Grigelis
- (Romania) A Ungur
6
6

- (Lithuania) L Grigelis
- (Romania) A Ungur
6
6

3
- (Italy) R Ghedin
- (Germany) C Grassi
2
1

- (Lithuania) L Grigelis
- (Romania) A Ungur
6
6^{9}
[10]

WC
- (Morocco) Y Idmbarek
- (Morocco) M Jdi
2
1

2
- (France) F Martin
- (India) P Raja
4
7^{11}
[4]

- (Slovakia) I Klec
- (Germany) G Kretschmer
6
6

- (Slovakia) I Klec
- (Germany) G Kretschmer
5
4

- (Portugal) R Machado
- (Portugal) FF Silva
1
4

2
- (France) F Martin
- (India) P Raja
7
6

2
- (France) F Martin
- (India) P Raja
6
6
