= 2011 Morocco Tennis Tour – Casablanca – Singles =

Casablanca – Singles
- 2011 Morocco Tennis Tour – Casablanca

Final
- Champion: (Russia) Evgeny Donskoy
- Runner-up: (Italy) Alessio di Mauro
- Score: 2–6, 6–3, 6–3

Events
Singles	Doubles
- Morocco Tennis Tour – Casablanca

Evgeny Donskoy won the title, defeating Alessio di Mauro 2–6, 6–3, 6–3 in the final.

== Seeds ==
1. (Germany) Denis Gremelmayr (withdrew due to flu)
2. (Germany) Simon Greul (quarterfinals)
3. (France) Benoît Paire (second round)
4. (France) Éric Prodon (first round)
5. (Czech Republic) Jaroslav Pospíšil (semifinals)
6. (Slovakia) Martin Kližan (second round)
7. (Italy) Alessio di Mauro (final)
8. (Germany) Bastian Knittel (second round)

== Draw ==
Key

- Q = Qualifier
- WC = Wild card
- LL = Lucky loser
- Alt = Alternate
- ITF = ITF entry
- PR = Protected ranking
- SR = Special ranking
- SE = Special exempt
- JE = Junior exempt
- JR = Junior Accelerator Programme entrant
- CO = College Accelerator Programme entrant
- NG = Next Gen Accelerator Program entrant
- w/o = Walkover
- r = Retired
- d = Defaulted

=== Finals ===
Semifinals
5	(Czech Republic) Jaroslav Pospíšil	6	4	4
Q	(Russia) Evgeny Donskoy	4	6	6
(Croatia) Franko Škugor	7	6^{6}	2
7	(Italy) Alessio di Mauro	6^{3}	7	6

Final
Q	(Russia) Evgeny Donskoy	2	6	6
7	(Italy) Alessio di Mauro	6	3	3

=== Top half ===
First round
Q	(Spain) A Menéndez	7	6
(Morocco) R El Amrani	6^{2}	0
(Romania) V Crivoi	2	3
(Croatia) A Veić	6	6
Q	(Latvia) D Pavlovs	1	6	2
(Australia) J Millman	6	2	6
Q	(Portugal) J Sousa	1	4
5	(Czech Republic) J Pospíšil	6	6
3	(France) B Paire	6	6
Alt	(Portugal) L Tavares	2	4
WC	(Morocco) Y Rachidi	2	0
(Italy) M Viola	6	6
(France) O Patience	6^{4}	7	0^{r}
Q	(Russia) E Donskoy	7	6^{4}	1
WC	(Morocco) T Ouahabi	2	3
8	(Germany) B Knittel	6	6

Second round
Q	(Spain) A Menéndez	3	6	6
(Croatia) A Veić	6	3	4
(Australia) J Millman	3	4
5	(Czech Republic) J Pospíšil	6	6
3	(France) B Paire	7	1	6^{3}
(Italy) M Viola	6^{4}	6	7
Q	(Russia) E Donskoy	6	6
8	(Germany) B Knittel	2	3

Quarterfinals
Q	(Spain) A Menéndez	5	4
5	(Czech Republic) J Pospíšil	7	6
(Italy) M Viola	6	4	5
Q	(Russia) E Donskoy	4	6	7

Semifinals
5	(Czech Republic) J Pospíšil	6	4	4
Q	(Russia) E Donskoy	4	6	6

=== Bottom half ===
First round
6	(Slovakia) M Kližan	3	6	6
LL	(Russia) I Belyaev	6	3	2
WC	(Morocco) Hicham Khaddari	4	2
(Russia) A Kuznetsov	6	6
(Italy) S Vagnozzi	6	7
LL	(Germany) Alexander Flock	2	5
(Croatia) F Škugor	6	6
4	(France) É Prodon	3	4
7	(Italy) A di Mauro	6	6
(Serbia) N Ćirić	2	0
(Spain) G Alcaide	6	6
(Spain) G Olaso	1	4
PR	(Bosnia and Herzegovina) A Delić	6	6
(Slovakia) I Klec	2	4
WC	(Morocco) A Fattar	2	2
2	(Germany) S Greul	6	6

Second round
6	(Slovakia) M Kližan	3	4
(Russia) A Kuznetsov	6	6
(Italy) S Vagnozzi	6^{4}	4
(Croatia) F Škugor	7	6
7	(Italy) A di Mauro	6	6
(Spain) G Alcaide	3	2
PR	(Bosnia and Herzegovina) A Delić
2	(Germany) S Greul	w/o

Quarterfinals
(Russia) A Kuznetsov	3	3
(Croatia) F Škugor	6	6
7	(Italy) A di Mauro	4	6	6
2	(Germany) S Greul	6	2	1

Semifinals
(Croatia) F Škugor	7	6^{6}	2
7	(Italy) A di Mauro	6^{3}	7	6
