= 2015 Morocco Tennis Tour – Casablanca – Singles =

Casablanca – Singles
- 2015 Morocco Tennis Tour – Casablanca

Final
- Champion: (Morocco) Lamine Ouahab
- Runner-up: (Spain) Javier Martí
- Score: 6–0, 7–6^{(8–6)}

Events
Singles	Doubles
← 2013 ·	Morocco Tennis Tour – Casablanca	· 2016 →

Dominic Thiem was the defending champion, having won the previous tournament in 2013, but concentrating on the ATP tour he did not participate this year.

Lamine Ouahab won the title, defeating Javier Martí in the final.

== Seeds ==
1. (Spain) Albert Montañés (second round)
2. (Spain) Daniel Gimeno Traver (first round)
3. (Romania) Adrian Ungur (quarterfinals)
4. (Spain) Roberto Carballés Baena (first round)
5. (Spain) Rubén Ramírez Hidalgo (first round)
6. (Bosnia and Herzegovina) Mirza Bašić (first round)
7. (Belgium) Julien Cagnina (first round)
8. (Croatia) Nikola Mektić (second round)

== Draw ==
=== Key ===
- Q = Qualifier
- WC = Wild card
- LL = Lucky loser
- Alt = Alternate
- SE = Special exempt
- PR = Protected ranking
- ITF = ITF entry
- JE = Junior exempt
- w/o = Walkover
- r = Retired
- d = Defaulted
- SR = Special ranking

=== Finals ===
Semifinals
Q	(France) Guillaume Rufin	6	2	1
WC	(Morocco) Lamine Ouahab	3	6	6
PR	(Spain) Javier Martí	6	6
Q	(Serbia) Laslo Djere	1	3

Final
WC	(Morocco) Lamine Ouahab	6	7^{8}
PR	(Spain) Javier Martí	0	6^{6}

=== Top half ===
First round
1	(Spain) A Montañés	6	6
WC	(Morocco) Y Rachidi	0	1
Q	(France) G Rufin	6	6
WC	(Morocco) A Ahouda	4	1
(Italy) F Cipolla	6	6
(Slovenia) J Semrajc	0	2
(Portugal) R Machado	6	6
6	(Bosnia and Herzegovina) M Bašić	4	2
3	(Romania) A Ungur	7^{7}	6
(Lithuania) L Grigelis	6^{2}	3
(France) G Burquier	7^{7}	6
(Slovakia) F Horanský	6^{5}	3
WC	(Morocco) L Ouahab	6	6
(Austria) D Novak	1	3
(France) Julien Obry	0	6^{4}
8	(Croatia) N Mektić	6	7^{7}

Second round
1	(Spain) A Montañés	3	5
Q	(France) G Rufin	6	7
(Italy) F Cipolla	6	2	4
(Portugal) R Machado	4	6	6
3	(Romania) A Ungur	6	6
(France) G Burquier	1	3
WC	(Morocco) L Ouahab	7	6
8	(Croatia) N Mektić	5	4

Quarterfinals
Q	(France) G Rufin	7	6
(Portugal) R Machado	5	1
3	(Romania) A Ungur	2	2
WC	(Morocco) L Ouahab	6	6

Semifinals
Q	(France) G Rufin	6	2	1
WC	(Morocco) L Ouahab	3	6	6

=== Bottom half ===
First round
5	(Spain) R Ramírez Hidalgo	5	2
PR	(Spain) J Martí	7	6
(Portugal) FF Silva	6	2	6
(Egypt) M Safwat	2	6	2
(Slovakia) I Klec	6	6
(France) F Martin	4	2
Q	(France) M Teixeira	6	4	6
4	(Spain) R Carballés Baena	3	6	2
7	(Belgium) J Cagnina	4	6	6^{2}
(Belgium) G Gigounon	6	4	7^{7}
WC	(Morocco) Y Idmbarek	1	3
(France) F Serra	6	6
(Spain) G Granollers	2	3
Q	(Croatia) F Škugor	6	6
Q	(Serbia) L Djere	6	6^{4}	6
2	(Spain) D Gimeno Traver	4	7^{7}	4

Second round
PR	(Spain) J Martí	6	6
(Portugal) FF Silva	0	3
(Slovakia) I Klec	1	2
Q	(France) M Teixeira	6	6
(Belgium) G Gigounon	2	7^{7}	5
(France) F Serra	6	6^{5}	7
Q	(Croatia) F Škugor	4	3
Q	(Serbia) L Djere	6	6

Quarterfinals
PR	(Spain) J Martí	6	6
Q	(France) M Teixeira	1	0
(France) F Serra	4	2
Q	(Serbia) L Djere	6	6

Semifinals
PR	(Spain) J Martí	6	6
Q	(Serbia) L Djere	1	3
