= 2012 Grand Prix Hassan II – Singles =

Singles
- 2012 Grand Prix Hassan II

Final
- Champions: (Spain) Pablo Andújar
- Runners-up: (Spain) Albert Ramos
- Score: 6–1, 7–6^{(7–5)}

Details
- Draw: 28
- Seeds: 8

Events
Singles	Doubles
← 2011 ·	Grand Prix Hassan II	· 2013 →

Pablo Andújar successfully defended his title, beating Albert Ramos 6–1, 7–6^{(7–5)} in an all-Spanish final.

== Seeds ==
The top four seeds receive a bye into the second round.

1. (Germany) Florian Mayer (second round)
2. (Ukraine) Alexandr Dolgopolov (second round)
3. (Spain) Pablo Andújar (champion)
4. (Uzbekistan) Denis Istomin (second round)
5. (United States) Donald Young (first round)
6. (Netherlands) Robin Haase (first round)
7. (Spain) Albert Ramos (final)
8. (Italy) Fabio Fognini (first round)

== Draw ==
=== Key ===
- Q = Qualifier
- WC = Wild card
- LL = Lucky loser
- Alt = Alternate
- SE = Special exempt
- PR = Protected ranking
- ITF = ITF entry
- JE = Junior exempt
- w/o = Walkover
- r = Retired
- d = Defaulted
- SR = Special ranking

=== Finals ===
Semifinals
7	(Spain) Albert Ramos	6	7^{9}
(Russia) Igor Andreev	3	6^{7}
3	(Spain) Pablo Andújar	6	7
(Italy) Flavio Cipolla	3	5

Final
7	(Spain) Albert Ramos	1	6^{5}
3	(Spain) Pablo Andújar	6	7^{7}

=== Top half ===
First round
Q	(Argentina) F Delbonis	4	5
(France) J Chardy	6	7
(Tunisia) M Jaziri	2	0^{r}
(Romania) V Hănescu	6	3
(Spain) P Riba	2	3
7	(Spain) A Ramos	6	6
(Spain) A Montañés	3	3
(Russia) I Andreev	6	6
(France) P-H Mathieu	6	6
WC	(Morocco) M Ziadi	3	1
(Spain) G García López	6	3	7
8	(Italy) F Fognini	4	6	5

Second round
1	(Germany) F Mayer	3	1
(France) J Chardy	6	6
(Romania) V Hănescu	2	4
7	(Spain) A Ramos	6	6
4	(Uzbekistan) D Istomin	7^{7}	3	2
(Russia) I Andreev	6^{3}	6	6
(France) P-H Mathieu	4	2
(Spain) G García López	6	6

Quarterfinals
(France) J Chardy	3	4
7	(Spain) A Ramos	6	6
(Russia) I Andreev	6	6
(Spain) G García López	4	2

Semifinals
7	(Spain) A Ramos	6	7^{9}
(Russia) I Andreev	3	6^{7}

=== Bottom half ===
First round
6	(Netherlands) R Haase	3	2
Q	(Algeria) L Ouahab	6	6
Q	(Spain) S Gutiérrez-Ferrol	6	6
(Portugal) R Machado	2	1
(Italy) P Starace	6	7
Q	(Spain) R Bautista-Agut	4	5
5	(United States) D Young	6	6^{5}	2
(France) B Paire	4	7^{7}	6
(Germany) M Bachinger	6	3	6
(Italy) F Volandri	3	6	3
(Italy) F Cipolla	6	2	6
WC	(Morocco) Y Idmbarek	1	6	1

Second round
Q	(Algeria) L Ouahab	4	1
Q	(Spain) S Gutiérrez-Ferrol	6	6
(Italy) P Starace	3	0
3	(Spain) P Andújar	6	6
(France) B Paire	6^{3}	6	6
(Germany) M Bachinger	7^{7}	3	2
(Italy) F Cipolla	6	6
2/WC	(Ukraine) A Dolgopolov	4	1

Quarterfinals
Q	(Spain) S Gutiérrez-Ferrol	4	6	3
3	(Spain) P Andújar	6	1	6
(France) B Paire	3	4
(Italy) F Cipolla	6	6

Semifinals
3	(Spain) P Andújar	6	7
(Italy) F Cipolla	3	5

== Qualifying ==
=== Seeds ===
1. (Kazakhstan) Mikhail Kukushkin (second round)
2. (Germany) Michael Berrer (first round)
3. (Russia) Evgeny Donskoy (qualifying competition)
4. (Germany) Dustin Brown (first round)
5. (Argentina) Federico Delbonis (qualified)
6. (Spain) Roberto Bautista Agut (qualified)
7. (France) Florent Serra (second round)
8. (Russia) Andrey Kuznetsov (second round)

=== Qualifiers ===
1. (Algeria) Lamine Ouahab
2. (Argentina) Federico Delbonis
3. (Spain) Sergio Gutiérrez Ferrol
4. (Spain) Roberto Bautista Agut

=== Draw ===
==== First qualifier ====
First round
1	(Kazakhstan) Mikhail Kukushkin	6	6
WC	(Morocco) Abdelkader Benabdellah	2	1
(Morocco) Reda Karakhi	1	1
(Austria) Martin Fischer	6	6
(Morocco) Omar Erramy	1	1
(Algeria) Lamine Ouahab	6	6
(Spain) Rafael Mazón-Hernández	2	4
7	(France) Florent Serra	6	6

Second round
1	(Kazakhstan) Mikhail Kukushkin	6^{7}	6^{6}
(Austria) Martin Fischer	7^{9}	7^{8}
(Algeria) Lamine Ouahab	7^{7}	6
7	(France) Florent Serra	6^{3}	2

Qualifying competition
(Austria) Martin Fischer	7	3	3
(Algeria) Lamine Ouahab	5	6	6

==== Second qualifier ====
First round
2	(Germany) Michael Berrer	6	0	2
(Netherlands) Matwé Middelkoop	4	6	6
WC	(Morocco) Mehdi Benhammou	0	1
(France) Nicolas Devilder	6	6
(Spain) Adrián Menéndez	5	1
(Italy) Alessio di Mauro	7	6
(Italy) Andrea Arnaboldi	6^{5}	4
5	(Argentina) Federico Delbonis	7^{7}	6

Second round
(Netherlands) Matwé Middelkoop	1	6	4
(France) Nicolas Devilder	6	4	6
(Italy) Alessio di Mauro	1	2
5	(Argentina) Federico Delbonis	6	6

Qualifying competition
(France) Nicolas Devilder	2	3
5	(Argentina) Federico Delbonis	6	6

==== Third qualifier ====
First round
3	(Russia) Evgeny Donskoy	6	6
(Spain) José Checa Calvo	4	3
(Croatia) Nikola Mektić	6	6^{5}	6
(Netherlands) Miliaan Niesten	3	7^{7}	2
(Spain) Iván Navarro	1^{r}
(Spain) Sergio Gutiérrez Ferrol	4
WC	(Morocco) Ayoub Chakrouni	0	1
8	(Russia) Andrey Kuznetsov	6	6

Second round
3	(Russia) Evgeny Donskoy	4	7^{7}	6
(Croatia) Nikola Mektić	6	6^{5}	3
(Spain) Sergio Gutiérrez Ferrol	6	6
8	(Russia) Andrey Kuznetsov	1	4

Qualifying competition
3	(Russia) Evgeny Donskoy	6	2	5
(Spain) Sergio Gutiérrez Ferrol	4	6	7

==== Fourth qualifier ====
First round
4	(Germany) Dustin Brown	5	5
(Spain) Iñigo Cervantes Huegun	7	7
(Russia) Mikhail Elgin	6	6
(Brazil) André Sá	3	1
WC	(Morocco) Khalid Allouch	1	1
(Kazakhstan) Evgeny Korolev	6	6
(Germany) Eric Scherer
6	(Spain) Roberto Bautista Agut	w/o

Second round
(Spain) Iñigo Cervantes Huegun	6	7
(Russia) Mikhail Elgin	2	5
(Kazakhstan) Evgeny Korolev	1	1
6	(Spain) Roberto Bautista Agut	6	6

Qualifying competition
(Spain) Iñigo Cervantes Huegun	3	3
6	(Spain) Roberto Bautista Agut	6	6
