= 2015 Morocco Tennis Tour – Casablanca =

- Date: 12 January – 17 January
- Edition: 4th
- Location: Casablanca, Morocco

Champions

Singles
- (Morocco) Lamine Ouahab

Doubles
- (Lithuania) Laurynas Grigelis / (Romania) Adrian Ungur
- Morocco Tennis Tour – Casablanca

The 2015 Morocco Tennis Tour – Casablanca was a professional tennis tournament played on clay courts. It was the fourth edition of the tournament which was part of the 2015 ATP Challenger Tour. It took place in Casablanca, Morocco between 12 January and 17 January 2015.

== ATP entrants ==
=== Seeds ===
Country	Player	Rank^{1}	Seed
ESP	Albert Montañés	103	1
ESP	Daniel Gimeno Traver	108	2
ROU	Adrian Ungur	154	3
ESP	Roberto Carballés Baena	165	4
ESP	Rubén Ramírez Hidalgo	223	5
BIH	Mirza Bašić	268	6
BEL	Julien Cagnina	275	7
CRO	Nikola Mektić	276	8

=== Other entrants ===
The following players received wildcards into the singles main draw:

- (Morocco) Amine Ahouda
- (Morocco) Yassine Idmbarek
- (Morocco) Lamine Ouahab
- (Morocco) Younès Rachidi

The following player received entry with a protected ranking:

- (Spain) Javier Martí

The following players received entry from the qualifying draw:

- (Serbia) Laslo Djere
- (France) Guillaume Rufin
- (Croatia) Franko Škugor
- (France) Maxime Teixeira

== Champions ==
=== Singles ===
- (Morocco) Lamine Ouahab def. (Spain) Javier Martí, 6–0, 7–6^{(8–6)}

=== Doubles ===
- (Lithuania) Laurynas Grigelis / (Romania) Adrian Ungur def. (Italy) Flavio Cipolla / (Italy) Alessandro Motti, 3–6, 6–2, [10–5]
