= 2009 Morocco Tennis Tour – Meknes – Doubles =

Meknes – Doubles
- 2009 Morocco Tennis Tour – Meknes

Final
- Champions: (Spain) Marc López; (Algeria) Lamine Ouahab
- Runners-up: (Italy) Alessio di Mauro; (Italy) Giancarlo Petrazzuolo
- Score: 6–3, 7–5

Events
Singles	Doubles
← 2008 ·	Morocco Tennis Tour – Meknes	· 2010 →

Alberto Martín and Daniel Muñoz de la Nava were the defending champions but only Muñoz de la Nava chose to defend his title, partnering David Marrero.

Marc López and Lamine Ouahab won the title after defeating Alessio di Mauro and Giancarlo Petrazzuolo 6–3, 7–5 in the final.

== Seeds ==
1. (Spain) David Marrero / (Spain) Daniel Muñoz de la Nava (quarterfinals)
2. (Spain) Marc Fornell Mestres / (Spain) Carles Poch Gradin (semifinals)
3. (Spain) Marc López / (Algeria) Lamine Ouahab (champions)
4. (Italy) Alessio di Mauro / (Italy) Giancarlo Petrazzuolo (final)

== Draw ==
=== Key ===
- Q = Qualifier
- WC = Wild card
- LL = Lucky loser
- Alt = Alternate
- SE = Special exempt
- PR = Protected ranking
- ITF = ITF entry
- JE = Junior exempt
- w/o = Walkover
- r = Retired
- d = Defaulted
- SR = Special ranking

First round

Quarterfinals

Semifinals

Final

1
- (Spain) D Marrero
- (Spain) D Muñoz de la Nava
6
6

WC
- (Morocco) R Chaki
- (Morocco) M Saber
4
4

1
- (Spain) D Marrero
- (Spain) D Muñoz de la Nava
4
6
[4]

- (Germany) Alexander Flock
- (Greece) A Jakupovic
3
2

- (Czech Republic) L Friedl
- (Czech Republic) J Vaněk
6
3
[10]

- (Czech Republic) L Friedl
- (Czech Republic) J Vaněk
6
6

- (Czech Republic) L Friedl
- (Czech Republic) J Vaněk
4
6
[8]

4
- (Italy) A di Mauro
- (Italy) G Petrazzuolo
6
6

4
- (Italy) A di Mauro
- (Italy) G Petrazzuolo
6
2
[10]

- (Austria) R Eitzinger
- (Latvia) D Pavlovs
2
3

4
- (Italy) A di Mauro
- (Italy) G Petrazzuolo
6^{2}
6
[10]

WC
- (Morocco) A Fattar
- (Morocco) Y Idmbarek
0
7^{7}
[10]

WC
- (Morocco) A Fattar
- (Morocco) Y Idmbarek
7^{7}
1
[5]

- (Portugal) R Machado
- (Czech Republic) J Pospíšil
6
6^{5}
[6]

4
- (Italy) A di Mauro
- (Italy) G Petrazzuolo
3
5

- (Argentina) M Alund
- (Spain) G Olaso
4
1

3
- (Spain) M López
- (Algeria) L Ouahab
6
7

- (Slovakia) P Červenák
- (Netherlands) B Westerhof
6
6

- (Slovakia) P Červenák
- (Netherlands) B Westerhof
6
4
[4]

- (Spain) Í Cervantes
- (Spain) P Riba
5
2

3
- (Spain) M López
- (Algeria) L Ouahab
1
6
[10]

3
- (Spain) M López
- (Algeria) L Ouahab
7
6

3
- (Spain) M López
- (Algeria) L Ouahab
6
6

- (Spain) JA Sánchez de Luna
- (Spain) F Vicente
6
6

2
- (Spain) M Fornell Mestres
- (Spain) C Poch Gradin
2
2

WC
- (Morocco) R El Amrani
- (Morocco) Y Rachidi
3
0

- (Spain) JA Sánchez de Luna
- (Spain) F Vicente
6^{1}
6
[7]

- (Italy) A Brizzi
- (Italy) S Vagnozzi
2
3

2
- (Spain) M Fornell Mestres
- (Spain) C Poch Gradin
7^{7}
4
[10]

2
- (Spain) M Fornell Mestres
- (Spain) C Poch Gradin
6
6
