= 2012 Grand Prix Hassan II – Doubles =

Doubles
- 2012 Grand Prix Hassan II

Final
- Champions: (Germany) Dustin Brown; (Australia) Paul Hanley
- Runners-up: (Italy) Daniele Bracciali; (Italy) Fabio Fognini
- Score: 7–5, 6–3

Events
Singles	Doubles
- Grand Prix Hassan II

Robert Lindstedt and Horia Tecău are the two times defending champions, but this year they decided not to participate.
Dustin Brown and Paul Hanley won the final by defeating 4th seeded Daniele Bracciali and Fabio Fognini 7–5, 6–3.

== Seeds ==
1. (Czech Republic) František Čermák / (Slovakia) Filip Polášek (first round)
2. (United States) Eric Butorac / (Brazil) Bruno Soares (quarterfinals)
3. (Spain) David Marrero / (Brazil) Marcelo Melo (semifinals)
4. (Italy) Daniele Bracciali / (Italy) Fabio Fognini (final)

== Draw ==
Key

- Q = Qualifier
- WC = Wild card
- LL = Lucky loser
- Alt = Alternate
- ITF = ITF entry
- PR = Protected ranking
- SR = Special ranking
- SE = Special exempt
- JE = Junior exempt
- JR = Junior Accelerator Programme entrant
- CO = College Accelerator Programme entrant
- NG = Next Gen Accelerator Program entrant
- w/o = Walkover
- r = Retired
- d = Defaulted

=== Draw ===
First round

Quarterfinals

Semifinals

Final

1
- (Czech Republic) F Čermák
- (Slovakia) F Polášek
6^{3}
3

- (Germany) D Brown
- (Australia) P Hanley
7^{7}
6

- (Germany) D Brown
- (Australia) P Hanley
6
6

- (Ukraine) A Dolgopolov
- (Tunisia) M Jaziri
7^{7}
7^{8}

- (Ukraine) A Dolgopolov
- (Tunisia) M Jaziri
3
4

- (Spain) P Andújar
- (Spain) G García López
6^{5}
6^{6}

- (Germany) D Brown
- (Australia) P Hanley
6^{9}
7^{9}
[13]

3
- (Spain) D Marrero
- (Brazil) M Melo
6^{4}
7^{7}
[10]

3
- (Spain) D Marrero
- (Brazil) M Melo
7^{11}
6^{7}
[11]

- (Germany) C Kas
- (Austria) J Knowle
7^{7}
6^{5}
[1]

3
- (Spain) D Marrero
- (Brazil) M Melo
6
6

WC
- (Morocco) M Saber
- (Morocco) M Ziadi
4
0

- (Russia) M Elgin
- (Uzbekistan) D Istomin
3
2

- (Russia) M Elgin
- (Uzbekistan) D Istomin
6
6

- (Germany) D Brown
- (Australia) P Hanley
7
6

- (United Kingdom) J Marray
- (United Kingdom) J Murray
6^{3}
6
[10]

4
- (Italy) D Bracciali
- (Italy) F Fognini
5
3

- (Spain) A Montañés
- (Spain) A Ramos
7^{7}
2
[3]

- (United Kingdom) J Marray
- (United Kingdom) J Murray
4
4

- (Slovakia) M Mertiňák
- (Brazil) A Sá
6
6^{1}
[4]

4
- (Italy) D Bracciali
- (Italy) F Fognini
6
6

4
- (Italy) D Bracciali
- (Italy) F Fognini
3
7^{7}
[10]

4
- (Italy) D Bracciali
- (Italy) F Fognini
5
6
[11]

WC
- (Morocco) A Fattar
- (Morocco) Y Rachidi
1
2

- (Netherlands) R Haase
- (Netherlands) J-J Rojer
7
4
[9]

- (Netherlands) R Haase
- (Netherlands) J-J Rojer
6
6

- (Netherlands) R Haase
- (Netherlands) J-J Rojer
7
6

- (Germany) M Bachinger
- (Germany) F Mayer
1
2

2
- (United States) E Butorac
- (Brazil) B Soares
5
0

2
- (United States) E Butorac
- (Brazil) B Soares
6
6
