= 2011 Morocco Tennis Tour – Casablanca =

- Date: 21–27 February
- Edition: 1st
- Location: Casablanca, Morocco

Champions

Singles
- (Russia) Evgeny Donskoy

Doubles
- (Spain) Guillermo Alcaide / (Spain) Adrián Menéndez
- Morocco Tennis Tour – Casablanca

The 2011 Morocco Tennis Tour – Casablanca was a professional tennis tournament played on clay courts. It was the first edition of the tournament which is part of the 2011 ATP Challenger Tour. It took place in Casablanca, Morocco between February 21 and 27, 2011.

== ATP entrants ==
=== Seeds ===
Country	Player	Rank^{1}	Seed
GER	~~Denis Gremelmayr~~	105	1
GER	Simon Greul	117	2
FRA	Benoît Paire	120	3
FRA	Éric Prodon	130	4
CZE	Jaroslav Pospíšil	138	5
SVK	Martin Kližan	159	6
ITA	Alessio di Mauro	165	7
GER	Bastian Knittel	172	8

- Rankings are as of February 14, 2011.

=== Other entrants ===
The following players received wildcards into the singles main draw:

- (Morocco) Anas Fattar
- (Morocco) Hicham Khaddari
- (Morocco) Talal Ouahabi
- (Morocco) Younès Rachidi

The following players received entry from the qualifying draw:

- (Russia) Evgeny Donskoy
- (Spain) Adrián Menéndez Maceiras
- (Latvia) Deniss Pavlovs
- (Portugal) João Sousa

== Champions ==
=== Singles ===
(Russia) Evgeny Donskoy def. (Italy) Alessio di Mauro, 2–6, 6–3, 6–3

=== Doubles ===
(Spain) Guillermo Alcaide / (Spain) Adrián Menéndez def. (Portugal) Leonardo Tavares / (Italy) Simone Vagnozzi, 6–2, 6–1
