= 2009 Morocco Tennis Tour – Meknes – Singles =

Meknes – Singles
- 2009 Morocco Tennis Tour – Meknes

Final
- Champion: (Portugal) Rui Machado
- Runner-up: (Spain) David Marrero
- Score: 6–2, 6–7(6), 6–3

Events
Singles	Doubles
← 2008 ·	Morocco Tennis Tour – Meknes	· 2010 →

Iván Navarro was the defending champion, but he chose to not defend his title.
In the final Rui Machado defeated 6–2, 6–7(6), 6–3 David Marrero.

== Seeds ==
1. (Czech Republic) Jiří Vaněk (quarterfinals)
2. (Romania) Victor Crivoi (second round)
3. (Portugal) Rui Machado (champion)
4. (Spain) Pere Riba (second round)
5. (Australia) Peter Luczak (quarterfinals)
6. (Algeria) Lamine Ouahab (semifinals)
7. (Spain) Daniel Muñoz-de la Nava (second round)
8. (France) Éric Prodon (first round)

== Draw ==
=== Key ===
- Q = Qualifier
- WC = Wild card
- LL = Lucky loser
- Alt = Alternate
- ITF = ITF entry
- PR = Protected ranking
- SR = Special ranking
- SE = Special exempt
- JE = Junior exempt
- JR = Junior Accelerator Programme entrant
- CO = College Accelerator Programme entrant
- NG = Next Gen Accelerator Program entrant
- w/o = Walkover
- r = Retired
- d = Defaulted

=== Final four ===
Semifinals
(Spain) David Marrero	7	6
6/Q	(Algeria) Lamine Ouahab	5	4
3	(Portugal) Rui Machado	2	6	6
5	(Australia) Peter Luczak	6	4	1

Final
(Spain) David Marrero	2	7	3
3	(Portugal) Rui Machado	6	6^{6}	6

=== Top half ===
First round
1	(Czech Republic) J Vaněk	6	6
(Austria) R Eitzinger	0	2
(Italy) G Petrazzuolo	7	3	3
Q	(Spain) A Ramos-Viñolas	6^{5}	6	6
(Spain) D Marrero	6	7
(Spain) M López	3	6^{6}
WC	(Morocco) R El Amrani	7	6
8	(France) É Prodon	6^{4}	3
4	(Spain) P Riba	6	6
(Latvia) D Pavlovs	3	1
(Romania) G Moraru	3	7	2
(Spain) F Vicente	6	6^{7}	6
(Republic of Ireland) C Niland	6	0	6^{4}
(Argentina) M Alund	4	6	7
WC	(Morocco) R Chaki	2	2
6/Q	(Algeria) L Ouahab	6	6

Second round
1	(Czech Republic) J Vaněk	7	4	6
Q	(Spain) A Ramos-Viñolas	6^{6}	6	4
(Spain) D Marrero	7	6^{5}	7
WC	(Morocco) R El Amrani	5	7	6^{4}
4	(Spain) P Riba	4	6	2
(Spain) F Vicente	6	3	6
(Argentina) M Alund	3	2
6/Q	(Algeria) L Ouahab	6	6

Quarterfinals
1	(Czech Republic) J Vaněk	6^{6}	4
(Spain) D Marrero	7	6
(Spain) F Vicente	7	4	1
6/Q	(Algeria) L Ouahab	6^{3}	6	6

Semifinals
(Spain) D Marrero	7	6
6/Q	(Algeria) L Ouahab	5	4

=== Bottom half ===
First round
7	(Spain) D Muñoz-de la Nava	7	6
WC	(Morocco) Y Idmbarek	6^{3}	3
(Czech Republic) J Pospíšil	5	4
(Italy) A di Mauro	7	6
(Spain) C Poch-Gradin	7	6
Q	(Argentina) Leandro Migani	5	4
(Italy) S Vagnozzi	3	7	4
3	(Portugal) R Machado	6	6^{3}	6
5	(Australia) P Luczak	6	7
(Spain) M Fornell	3	6^{4}
WC	(Morocco) A Fattar	4	2
Q	(Spain) S Gutiérrez-Ferrol	6	6
(Brazil) D Dutra da Silva	6^{5}	2
(Slovakia) P Červenák	7	6
(Germany) Alexander Flock	5	6	2
2	(Romania) V Crivoi	7	3	6

Second round
7	(Spain) D Muñoz-de la Nava	4	7	1
(Italy) A di Mauro	6	6^{7}	6
(Spain) C Poch-Gradin	6^{6}	4
3	(Portugal) R Machado	7	6
5	(Australia) P Luczak	7	6
Q	(Spain) S Gutiérrez-Ferrol	6^{2}	3
(Slovakia) P Červenák	6	4	7
2	(Romania) V Crivoi	4	6	6^{3}

Quarterfinals
(Italy) A di Mauro	0	4
3	(Portugal) R Machado	6	6
5	(Australia) P Luczak	6	3	6
(Slovakia) P Červenák	4	6	4

Semifinals
3	(Portugal) R Machado	2	6	6
5	(Australia) P Luczak	6	4	1
