= 2009 Morocco Tennis Tour – Meknes =

Tennis tournament

- Date: February 23 – February 29
- Edition: 2nd
- Location: Meknes, Morocco

Champions

Singles
- (Portugal) Rui Machado

Doubles
- (Spain) Marc López / (Algeria) Lamine Ouahab
- Morocco Tennis Tour – Meknes

The 2009 Morocco Tennis Tour – Meknes was a professional tennis tournament played on outdoor clay courts. It was part of the 2009 ATP Challenger Tour. It took place in Meknes, Morocco between 23 and 29 February 2009.

== Singles main-draw entrants ==
=== Seeds ===
Country	Player	Rank	Seed
CZE	Jiří Vaněk	116	1
ROU	Victor Crivoi	127	2
POR	Rui Machado	147	3
ESP	Pere Riba	152	4
AUS	Peter Luczak	166	5
ALG	Lamine Ouahab	169	6
ESP	Daniel Muñoz de la Nava	182	7
FRA	Éric Prodon	191	8

- Rankings are as of February 16, 2009.

=== Other entrants ===
The following players received wildcards into the singles main draw:

- (Morocco) Rabie Chaki
- (Morocco) Reda El Amrani
- (Morocco) Anas Fattar
- (Morocco) Yassine Idmbarek

The following players received entry from the qualifying draw:

- (Spain) Sergio Gutiérrez Ferrol
- (Argentina) Leandro Migani
- (Algeria) Lamine Ouahab
- (Spain) Albert Ramos Viñolas

== Champions ==
=== Men's singles ===
(Portugal) Rui Machado def. (Spain) David Marrero, 6–2, 6–7(6), 6–3

=== Men's doubles ===
(Spain) Marc López / (Algeria) Lamine Ouahab def. (Italy) Alessio di Mauro / (Italy) Giancarlo Petrazzuolo, 6–3, 7–5
