= 2012 Grand Prix Hassan II =

- Date: 9–15 April
- Edition: 28th
- Category: ATP World Tour 250
- Draw: 28S / 16D
- Prize money: €398,250
- Surface: Clay / outdoor
- Location: Casablanca, Morocco

Champions

Singles
- (Spain) Pablo Andújar

Doubles
- (Germany) Dustin Brown / (Australia) Paul Hanley
- Grand Prix Hassan II

The 2012 Grand Prix Hassan II was a professional men's tennis tournament played on outdoor clay courts. It was the 28th edition of the tournament which was part of the ATP World Tour 250 category 2012 ATP World Tour. It took place in Casablanca, Morocco between 9 April and 15 April 2012. Third-seeded Pablo Andújar won the singles title.

== Singles main-draw entrants ==
=== Seeds ===
Country	Player	Rank^{1}	Seed
GER	Florian Mayer	20	1
UKR	Alexandr Dolgopolov	22	2
ESP	Pablo Andújar	39	3
UZB	Denis Istomin	43	4
USA	Donald Young	46	5
NED	Robin Haase	53	6
ESP	Albert Ramos	54	7
ITA	Fabio Fognini	57	8

- ^{1} Rankings are as of April 2, 2012

=== Other entrants ===
The following players received wildcards into the singles main draw:

- (Ukraine) Alexandr Dolgopolov
- (Morocco) Yassine Idmbarek
- (Morocco) Mehdi Ziadi

The following players received entry from the qualifying draw:

- (Spain) Roberto Bautista Agut
- (Argentina) Federico Delbonis
- (Spain) Sergio Gutiérrez Ferrol
- (Algeria) Lamine Ouahab

=== Withdrawals ===
- (Poland) Łukasz Kubot

=== Retirements ===
- (Tunisia) Malek Jaziri (dizziness)

== Doubles main-draw entrants ==
=== Seeds ===
Country	Player	Country	Player	Rank^{1}	Seed
CZE	František Čermák	SVK	Filip Polášek	42	1
USA	Eric Butorac	BRA	Bruno Soares	55	2
ESP	David Marrero	BRA	Marcelo Melo	63	3
ITA	Daniele Bracciali	ITA	Fabio Fognini	73	4

- Rankings are as of April 2, 2012

=== Other entrants ===
The following pairs received wildcards into the doubles main draw:

- (Morocco) Anas Fattar / (Morocco) Younès Rachidi
- (Morocco) Mohamed Saber / (Morocco) Mehdi Ziadi

== Finals ==
=== Singles ===
(Spain) Pablo Andújar defeated (Spain) Albert Ramos 6–1, 7–6^{(7–5)}

- It was Andújar's 2nd career title and the 2nd in Casablanca.

=== Doubles ===
(Germany) Dustin Brown / (Australia) Paul Hanley defeated (Italy) Daniele Bracciali / (Italy) Fabio Fognini, 7–5, 6–3
