= 2012 Morocco Tennis Tour – Casablanca =

- Date: 27 February – 4 March
- Edition: 2nd
- Location: Casablanca, Morocco

Champions

Singles
- (Slovenia) Aljaž Bedene

Doubles
- (Italy) Walter Trusendi / (Italy) Matteo Viola
- Morocco Tennis Tour – Casablanca

The 2012 Morocco Tennis Tour – Casablanca was a professional tennis tournament played on clay courts. It was the second edition of the tournament which was part of the 2012 ATP Challenger Tour. It took place in Casablanca, Morocco between 27 February and 4 March 2012.

== ATP entrants ==
=== Seeds ===
Country	Player	Rank^{1}	Seed
ROU	Adrian Ungur	101	1
SVK	Martin Kližan	119	2
RUS	Evgeny Donskoy	138	3
ESP	Daniel Muñoz de la Nava	141	4
ITA	Matteo Viola	144	5
CZE	Jan Hájek	146	6
ESP	Pablo Carreño Busta	148	7
CZE	Ivo Minář	159	8

- Rankings are as of February 20, 2012.

=== Other entrants ===
The following players received wildcards into the singles main draw:

- (Morocco) Yassine Idmbarek
- (Morocco) Mehdi Jdi
- (Morocco) Reda Karakhi
- (Morocco) Younès Rachidi

The following players received entry from the qualifying draw:

- (France) Nicolas Devilder
- (Poland) Marcin Gawron
- (Spain) Sergio Gutiérrez Ferrol
- (Netherlands) Matwé Middelkoop
- (Belgium) Alexandre Folie (Lucky loser)

== Champions ==
=== Singles ===
(Slovenia) Aljaž Bedene def. (France) Nicolas Devilder, 7–6^{(8–6)}, 7–6^{(7–4)}

=== Doubles ===
(Italy) Walter Trusendi / (Italy) Matteo Viola def. (Russia) Evgeny Donskoy / (Russia) Andrey Kuznetsov, 1–6, 7–6^{(7–5)}, [10–3]
