= 2013 Morocco Tennis Tour – Casablanca =

- Date: 28 October – 3 November
- Edition: 3rd
- Location: Casablanca, Morocco

Champions

Singles
- (Austria) Dominic Thiem

Doubles
- (Italy) Claudio Grassi / (Italy) Riccardo Ghedin
- Morocco Tennis Tour – Casablanca

The 2013 Morocco Tennis Tour – Casablanca was a professional tennis tournament played on clay courts. It was the third edition of the tournament which was part of the 2013 ATP Challenger Tour. It took place in Casablanca, Morocco between 28 October –and 3 November 2013.

== ATP entrants ==
=== Seeds ===
Country	Player	Rank^{1}	Seed
CZE	Jan Hájek	103	1
AUT	Andreas Haider-Maurer	113	2
AUT	Dominic Thiem	141	3
ITA	Potito Starace	174	4
SLO	Blaž Rola	184	5
AUT	Gerald Melzer	186	6
ITA	Flavio Cipolla	187	7
CZE	Jaroslav Pospíšil	205	8

- Rankings are as of October 21, 2013.

=== Other entrants ===
The following players received wildcards into the singles main draw:

- (Morocco) Yassine Idmbarek
- (Morocco) Mehdi Jdi
- (Morocco) Hicham Khaddari
- (Morocco) Younès Rachidi

The following players received entry from the qualifying draw:

- (Italy) Riccardo Ghedin
- (Italy) Claudio Grassi
- (Austria) Marc Rath
- (Egypt) Sherif Sabry

== Champions ==
=== Singles ===
- (Austria) Dominic Thiem def. (Italy) Potito Starace 6–2, 7–5

=== Doubles ===
- (Italy) Claudio Grassi / (Italy) Riccardo Ghedin def. (Germany) Gero Kretschmer / (Germany) Alexander Satschko 6–4, 6–4
