= Walter Trusendi =

Italian tennis player

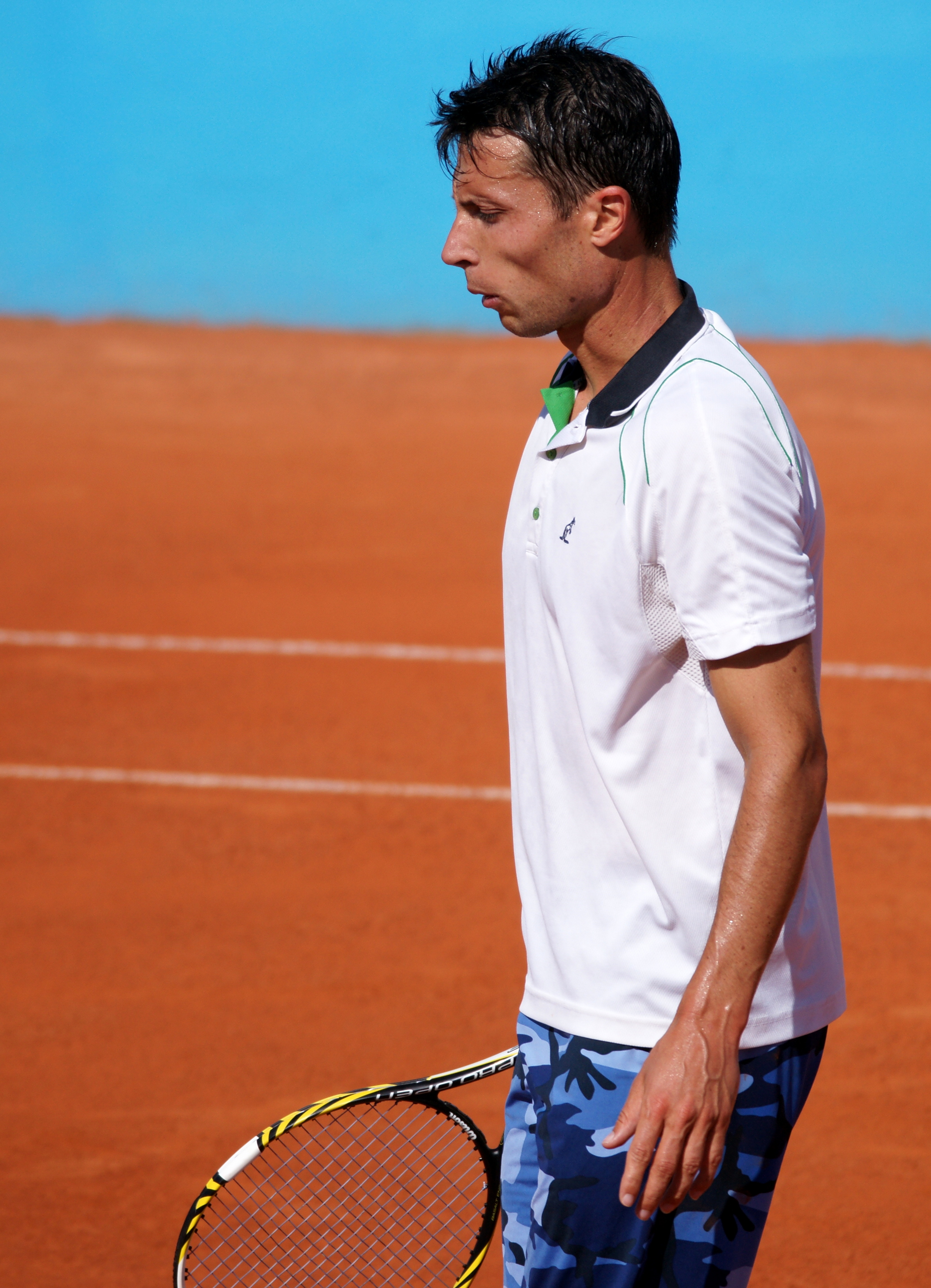
- Country (sports): Italy
- Born: 3 January 1985 (age 41)
- Turned pro: 2007
- Retired: 2019
- Plays: Right-handed (one-handed backhand)
- Prize money: $192,518

Singles
- Career record: 0–1 (in ATP Tour and Grand Slam main draws, and in Davis Cup)
- Career titles: 0
- Highest ranking: No. 299 (29 August 2011)

Doubles
- Career record: 0–0 (in ATP Tour and Grand Slam main draws, and in Davis Cup)
- Career titles: 0
- Highest ranking: No. 161 (31 August 2009)

Walter Trusendi (born 3 January 1985) is an Italian former professional tennis player and competes mainly on the ATP Challenger Tour and ITF Futures, both in singles and doubles.

Trusendi reached his highest ATP singles ranking of World No. 299 in 29 August 2011 and his highest ATP doubles ranking of No. 161 in 31 August 2009.

In final matches to date, he has a career record of 8 wins and 10 losses in singles matches, and 39 wins and 24 losses in doubles matches.

In July 2012, Trusendi qualified for his only career ATP Tour main draw match at the 2012 Croatia Open. He won the necessary 3 consecutive matches in qualifying, against Saša Stojisavljević, Damir Džumhur and Bastian Trinker, before falling in the first round to Daniel Brands of Germany 1-6, 6-7^{(8-10)}.

== ATP Challenger and ITF Futures finals ==
=== Singles: 18 (8–10) ===
Legend ATP Challenger (0–1) ITF Futures (8–9)	Finals by surface Hard (0–0) Clay (8–10) Grass (0–0) Carpet (0–0)

Result	W–L	Date	Tournament	Tier	Surface	Opponent	Score
Loss	0–1	Sep 2007	Austria F10, Pörtschach	Futures	Clay	(Austria) Christian Magg	1–6, 6–1, 2–6
Loss	0–2	Jul 2008	Rimini, Italy	Challenger	Clay	(Argentina) Diego Junqueira	4–6, 3–6
Win	1–2	Feb 2009	Italy F1, Bari	Futures	Clay	(Italy) Leonardo Azzaro	6–3, 6–3
Loss	1–3	Nov 2010	Iran F7, Kish Island	Futures	Clay	(Ukraine) Artem Smirnov	1–6, 2–6
Loss	1–4	Mar 2011	Italy F3, Foggia	Futures	Clay	(Serbia) Dušan Lajović	2–6, 7–6^{(9–7)}, 2–6
Loss	1–5	May 2011	Italy F11, Cesena	Futures	Clay	(Moldova) Radu Albot	6–2, 2–6, 6–7^{(1–7)}
Loss	1–6	Aug 2011	Italy F21, Avezzano	Futures	Clay	(Italy) Riccardo Sinicropi	6–4, 6–7^{(2–7)}, 1–3 ret.
Win	2–6	Jun 2013	Austria F1, Seefeld	Futures	Clay	(Austria) Christian Trubrig	7–5, 4–6, 6–1
Loss	2–7	Jul 2013	Italy F16, Sassuolo	Futures	Clay	(Italy) Andrea Arnaboldi	6–7^{(0–7)}, 6–4, 2–6
Win	3–7	Sep 2013	Italy F25, Santa Margherita Di Pula	Futures	Clay	(Italy) Marco Bartolotti	6–3, 6–7^{(5–7)}, 6–2
Win	4–7	Sep 2013	Italy F26, Santa Margherita Di Pula	Futures	Clay	(Italy) Francesco Picco	4–6, 6–3, 6–3
Win	5–7	Sep 2014	Italy F32, Santa Margherita Di Pula	Futures	Clay	(Germany) Yannick Maden	6–1, 3–6, 6–1
Win	6–7	Oct 2014	Italy F34, Santa Margherita Di Pula	Futures	Clay	(Italy) Andrea Basso	3–6, 6–4, 6–4
Loss	6–8	Oct 2014	Italy F36, Santa Margherita Di Pula	Futures	Clay	(France) Johan Sebastien Tatlot	6–2, 5–7, 3–6
Loss	6–9	Jun 2016	Italy F16, Basilicanova	Futures	Clay	(Italy) Lorenzo Giustino	4–6, 4–6
Win	7–9	Jul 2016	Italy F18, Albinea	Futures	Clay	(Italy) Francesco Picco	7–5, 6–2
Win	8–9	Oct 2016	Italy F31, Santa Margherita Di Pula	Futures	Clay	(Italy) Riccardo Bonadio	6–3, 6–1
Loss	8–10	Oct 2016	Italy F35, Santa Margherita Di Pula	Futures	Clay	(Germany) Marvin Netuschil	6–7^{(6–8)}, 4–6

=== Doubles: 63 (39–24) ===
Legend ATP Challenger (4–4) ITF Futures (35–20)	Finals by surface Hard (2–1) Clay (37–22) Grass (0–0) Carpet (0–1)

Result	W–L	Date	Tournament	Tier	Surface	Partner	Opponents	Score
Win	1–0	Apr 2007	Italy F9, Livorno	Futures	Clay	(Italy) Matteo Marrai	(Italy) Fabio Colangelo (Italy) Mattia Livraghi	6–4, 6–2
Win	2–0	Jul 2007	Italy F22, Carpi	Futures	Clay	(Italy) Matteo Marrai	(Italy) Alessandro Accardo (Italy) Andrea Merati	6–1, 6–4
Win	3–0	Jul 2007	Italy F23, Palazzolo	Futures	Clay	(Italy) Matteo Marrai	(France) Nicolas Grammare (Colombia) O. Rodriguez-Sanchez	6–4, 6–0
Win	4–0	Aug 2007	Italy F25, Imperia	Futures	Clay	(Italy) Matteo Marrai	(Italy) Matteo Trevisan (Italy) D-A Lopez Cassaccia	6–2, 6–3
Loss	4–1	Sep 2007	Switzerland F6, Geneva	Futures	Clay	(Italy) Matteo Marrai	(Estonia) Mait Künnap (Spain) Jordi Marse-Vidri	5–7, 3–6
Win	5–1	Sep 2007	Italy F33, Sardegna	Futures	Clay	(Italy) Matteo Marrai	(Czech Republic) Dušan Karol (Czech Republic) Filip Zeman	6–1, 3–6, [10–3]
Loss	5–2	Oct 2007	Italy F35, San Pietro	Futures	Clay	(Italy) Thomas Fabbiano	(Italy) Fabio Colangelo (Italy) Marco Crugnola	5–7, 6–4, [8–10]
Loss	5–3	Jan 2008	Colombia F1, Manizales	Futures	Clay	(Italy) Matteo Marrai	(Brazil) André Miele (Brazil) João Souza	4–6, 4–6
Loss	5–4	May 2008	Italy F12, Vicenza	Futures	Clay	(Italy) Giancarlo Petrazzuolo	(Chile) Jorge Aguilar (Ecuador) Carlos Avellán	6–7^{(2–7)}, 4–6
Loss	5–5	Jun 2008	Italy F19, Castelfranco	Futures	Clay	(Italy) Matteo Viola	(Italy) Giancarlo Petrazzuolo (Italy) Federico Torresi	6–7^{(4–7)}, 6–7^{(5–7)}
Win	6–5	Sep 2008	Genoa, Italy	Challenger	Clay	(Italy) Gianluca Naso	(Italy) Stefano Galvani (San Marino) Domenico Vicini	6–4, 7–6^{(7–2)}
Win	7–5	Sep 2008	Todi, Italy	Challenger	Clay	(Italy) Gianluca Naso	(Italy) Alberto Brizzi (Italy) Alessandro Motti	4–6, 7–6^{(7–3)}, [10–4]
Win	8–5	Oct 2008	Italy F33, Sassari	Futures	Clay	(Italy) Matteo Marrai	(Italy) Thomas Fabbiano (Italy) Claudio Grassi	6–3, 0–6, [10–5]
Win	9–5	Feb 2009	Italy F1, Bari	Futures	Clay	(Latvia) Deniss Pavlovs	(Italy) Fabio Colangelo (Italy) Marco Crugnola	4–6, 6–3, [10–4]
Loss	9–6	May 2009	Italy F10, Pozzuoli	Futures	Clay	(Italy) Leonardo Azzaro	(Argentina) Juan-Martín Aranguren (Argentina) Alejandro Fabbri	4–6, 4–6
Win	10–6	May 2009	Italy F11, Parma	Futures	Clay	(Argentina) Juan-Martín Aranguren	(Australia) Greg Jones (Netherlands) Antal van der Duim	6–2, 6–3
Loss	10–7	Jun 2009	Reggio Emilia, Italy	Challenger	Clay	(Italy) Gianluca Naso	(Spain) M-A López Jaén (Spain) Pere Riba	4–6, 4–6
Win	11–7	Aug 2009	Italy F21, La Spezia	Futures	Clay	(Italy) Claudio Grassi	(Italy) Stefano Ianni (Italy) D. Della Tommasina	6–2, 4–6, [10–7]
Win	12–7	Feb 2010	Spain F4, Murcia	Futures	Clay	(Italy) Daniele Giorgini	(Spain) Pablo Santos González (Spain) Gabriel Trujillo Soler	7–6^{(7–3)}, 6–1
Win	13–7	Feb 2010	Spain F5, Murcia	Futures	Clay	(Italy) Daniele Giorgini	(Spain) Pablo Santos González (Spain) Gabriel Trujillo Soler	6–2, 6–3
Loss	13–8	Mar 2010	Switzerland F2, Wetzikon	Futures	Carpet	(Estonia) Jürgen Zopp	(Germany) Kevin Krawietz (Germany) Marcel Zimmermann	2–6, 6–3, [5–10]
Win	14–8	May 2010	Italy F7, Viterbo	Futures	Clay	(Chile) Guillermo Hormazábal	(Italy) Enrico Fioravante (Italy) Giancarlo Petrazzuolo	6–2, 6–1
Win	15–8	Jun 2010	Italy F12, Mestre	Futures	Clay	(Italy) Matteo Viola	(Serbia) Nikola Ćirić (Croatia) Franko Škugor	6–7^{(8–10)}, 6–1, [10–2]
Win	16–8	Jul 2010	Italy F18, Modena	Futures	Clay	(Italy) Francesco Aldi	(Italy) Filippo Leonardi (Italy) Jacopo Marchegiani	6–3, 6-4
Loss	16–9	Aug 2010	Italy F19, La Spezia	Futures	Clay	(Italy) Thomas Fabbiano	(Italy) Flavio Cipolla (Italy) Alessandro Giannessi	2–6, 6–7^{(7–9)}
Win	17–9	Nov 2010	Iran F6, Kish Island	Futures	Clay	(Italy) Enrico Burzi	(Austria) Gerald Melzer (Croatia) Kristijan Mesaroš	6–3, 6–2
Win	18–9	Mar 2011	Italy F1, Trento	Futures	Hard	(Latvia) Deniss Pavlovs	(France) Kevin Botti (France) Grégoire Burquier	6–2, 7-5
Loss	18–10	Apr 2011	Rome, Italy	Challenger	Clay	(Italy) Thomas Fabbiano	(Slovakia) Martin Kližan (Italy) Alessandro Motti	6–7^{(3–7)}, 4–6
Loss	18–11	Apr 2011	Italy F6, Padua	Futures	Clay	(Italy) Andrea Arnaboldi	(Croatia) Toni Androić (Croatia) Dino Marcan	4–6, 4–6
Loss	18–12	May 2011	Italy F11, Cesena	Futures	Clay	(Italy) Claudio Grassi	(Chile) Hans Podlipnik Castillo (Austria) Maz Raditschnigg	3–6, 3–6
Loss	18–13	Jul 2011	Italy F20, La Spezia	Futures	Clay	(Italy) Alessandro Giannessi	(Italy) D. Della Tommasina (Italy) Riccardo Sinicropi	6–7^{(3–7)}, 1–6
Loss	18–14	Oct 2011	Italy F31, Biella	Futures	Clay	(Italy) Andrea Arnaboldi	(Italy) Fabio Colangelo (Italy) Marco Crugnola	2–6, 6–1, [8–10]
Win	19–14	Mar 2012	Casablanca, Morocco	Challenger	Clay	(Italy) Matteo Viola	(Russia) Evgeny Donskoy (Russia) Andrey Kuznetsov	1–6, 7–6^{(7–5)}, [10–3]
Loss	19–15	May 2012	Rome, Italy	Challenger	Clay	(Spain) Adrián Menéndez	(United Kingdom) Jamie Delgado (United Kingdom) Ken Skupski	1–6, 4–6
Win	20–15	May 2012	Italy F9, Pozzuoli	Futures	Clay	(Italy) Claudio Grassi	(Italy) Alessio di Mauro (Italy) Stefano Napolitano	6–3, 6–2
Win	21–15	Jun 2012	Italy F14, Busto Arsizio	Futures	Clay	(Italy) Stefano Ianni	(Serbia) Boris Pashanski (Italy) Antonio Comporto	6–3, 6-3
Win	22–15	Jun 2013	Italy F12, Padua	Futures	Clay	(Argentina) Andrés Molteni	(Australia) Alex Bolt (Germany) Sami Reinwein	6–7^{(10–12)}, 6–3, [10–5]
Win	23–15	Aug 2013	Italy F19, La Spezia	Futures	Clay	(Italy) Daniele Giorgini	(Italy) Alessandro Bega (Italy) Riccardo Sinicropi	7–5, 6–3
Win	24–15	Oct 2013	Italy F28, Biella	Futures	Clay	(Italy) Matteo Volante	(Italy) Francesco Borgo (Italy) Marco Bortolotti	4–6, 6–3, [12–10]
Win	25–15	Oct 2013	Italy F29, Palermo	Futures	Clay	(Italy) Luca Vanni	(Italy) Riccardo Bonadio (Italy) Federico Maccari	6–2, 6–3
Win	26–15	Mar 2014	Italy F5, Santa Margherita Di Pula	Futures	Clay	(Italy) Filippo Baldi	(Italy) Emanuele Molina (Italy) Riccardo Sinicropi	6–2, 6–7^{(2–7)}, [13–11]
Win	27–15	Jun 2014	Italy F16, Cesena	Futures	Clay	(Italy) Luca Vanni	(Italy) Daniele Giorgini (Italy) Matteo Volante	6–4, 1–6, [12–10]
Win	28–15	Aug 2014	Italy F28, Este	Futures	Clay	(Italy) Francesco Picco	(Portugal) Fred Gil (Italy) Lorenzo Giustino	6–4, 7–6^{(10–8)}
Win	29–15	Sep 2014	Italy F32, Santa Margherita Di Pula	Futures	Clay	(Italy) Matteo Volante	(Italy) Lorenzo Frigerio (Italy) Giorgio Portaluri	6–2, 7–6^{(7–4)}
Loss	29–16	Oct 2014	Italy F34, Santa Margherita Di Pula	Futures	Clay	(Italy) Pietro Rondoni	(Portugal) Gonçalo Oliveira (Italy) Daniele Capecchi	6–2, 1–6, [9–11]
Loss	29–17	Oct 2014	Italy F36, Santa Margherita Di Pula	Futures	Clay	(Italy) D. Della Tommasina	(Italy) Salvatore Caruso (Italy) Gianluca Naso	6–3, 3–6, [8–10]
Win	30–17	Jan 2015	Egypt F1, Cairo	Futures	Clay	(Italy) Matteo Volante	(Poland) Pawel Cias (Poland) Maciej Nowak	6–1, 6–4
Loss	30–18	Feb 2016	Tunisia F6, Hammamet	Futures	Clay	(Italy) Matteo Volante	(Italy) Riccardo Bonadio (Argentina) Mariano Kestelboim	1–6, 6–2, [4–10]
Win	31–18	Mar 2016	Tunisia F8, Hammamet	Futures	Clay	(Italy) Antonio Campo	(Morocco) Amine Ahouda (Morocco) Yassine Idmbarek	7–5, 6–2
Win	32–18	Jun 2016	Tunisia F21, Hammamet	Futures	Clay	(Venezuela) Cristian Rodríguez	(Egypt) Karim-Mohamed Maamoun (Spain) R. Ortego-Oimedo	6–3, 2–6, [10–7]
Win	33–18	Feb 2017	Tempe, USA	Challenger	Hard	(Italy) Matteo Viola	(El Salvador) Marcelo Arévalo (Dominican Republic) Jose Hernandez-Fernandez	5–7, 6–2 [12–10]
Loss	33–19	Mar 2017	Italy F4, Sondrio	Futures	Hard	(Italy) Matteo Viola	(Czech Republic) Petr Nouza (Czech Republic) David Škoch	3–6, 7–5 [8–10]
Win	34–19	Jun 2017	Italy F17, Bergamo	Futures	Clay	(Italy) Andrea Vavassori	(Argentina) Franco Agamenone (Brazil) Fernando Romboli	6–1, 3–6, [13–11]
Loss	34–20	Jun 2017	Italy F18, Sassuolo	Futures	Clay	(Italy) Marco Bartolotti	(Brazil) Orlando Luz (Brazil) Marcelo Zormann	3–6, 3–6
Win	35–20	Jul 2017	Italy F23, Pontedera	Futures	Clay	(Italy) Andrea Basso	(Italy) Omar Giacalone (Italy) Jacopo Stefanini	6–2, 6–2
Win	36–20	Oct 2017	Italy F32, Santa Margherita Di Pula	Futures	Clay	(Italy) Andrea Vavassori	(United States) Hunter Johnson (United States) Yates Johnson	7–6^{(7–3)}, 6–3
Loss	36–21	Oct 2017	Italy F33, Santa Margherita Di Pula	Futures	Clay	(Italy) Andrea Vavassori	(Italy) Omar Giacalone (Italy) Jacopo Stefanini	5–7, 2–6
Win	37–21	Mar 2018	Italy F2, Santa Margherita Di Pula	Futures	Clay	(Italy) Gianluca Di Nicola	(United Kingdom) Billy Harris (Poland) Maciej Rajski	7–5, 6–3
Loss	37–22	Mar 2018	Italy F3, Santa Margherita Di Pula	Futures	Clay	(Italy) Gianluca Di Nicola	(Uruguay) Martín Cuevas (Bolivia) Hugo Dellien	6–7^{(1–7)}, 5–7
Loss	37–23	Apr 2018	Italy F6, Santa Margherita Di Pula	Futures	Clay	(Italy) Gianluca Mager	(Argentina) Juan Ignacio Galarza (Argentina) Mariano Kestelboim	6–1, 4–6, [6–10]
Loss	37–24	Jul 2018	Padua, Italy	Challenger	Clay	(Italy) Andrea Vavassori	(Bosnia and Herzegovina) Tomislav Brkić (Croatia) Ante Pavić	2–6, 6–7^{(4–7)}
Win	38–24	Aug 2018	Italy F24, Cuneo	Futures	Clay	(Italy) Matto Bartolotti	(Argentina) Tomás Martín Etcheverry (Italy) Corrado Summaria	6–3, 6–0
Win	39–24	Sep 2018	Italy F28, Santa Margherita Di Pula	Futures	Clay	(Italy) Matto Bartolotti	(Austria) Gibril Diarra (Austria) Peter Goldsteiner	7–5, 6–2
