= Evgeny Donskoy =

Russian tennis player (born 1990)

Evgeny Donskoy Евгений Донской
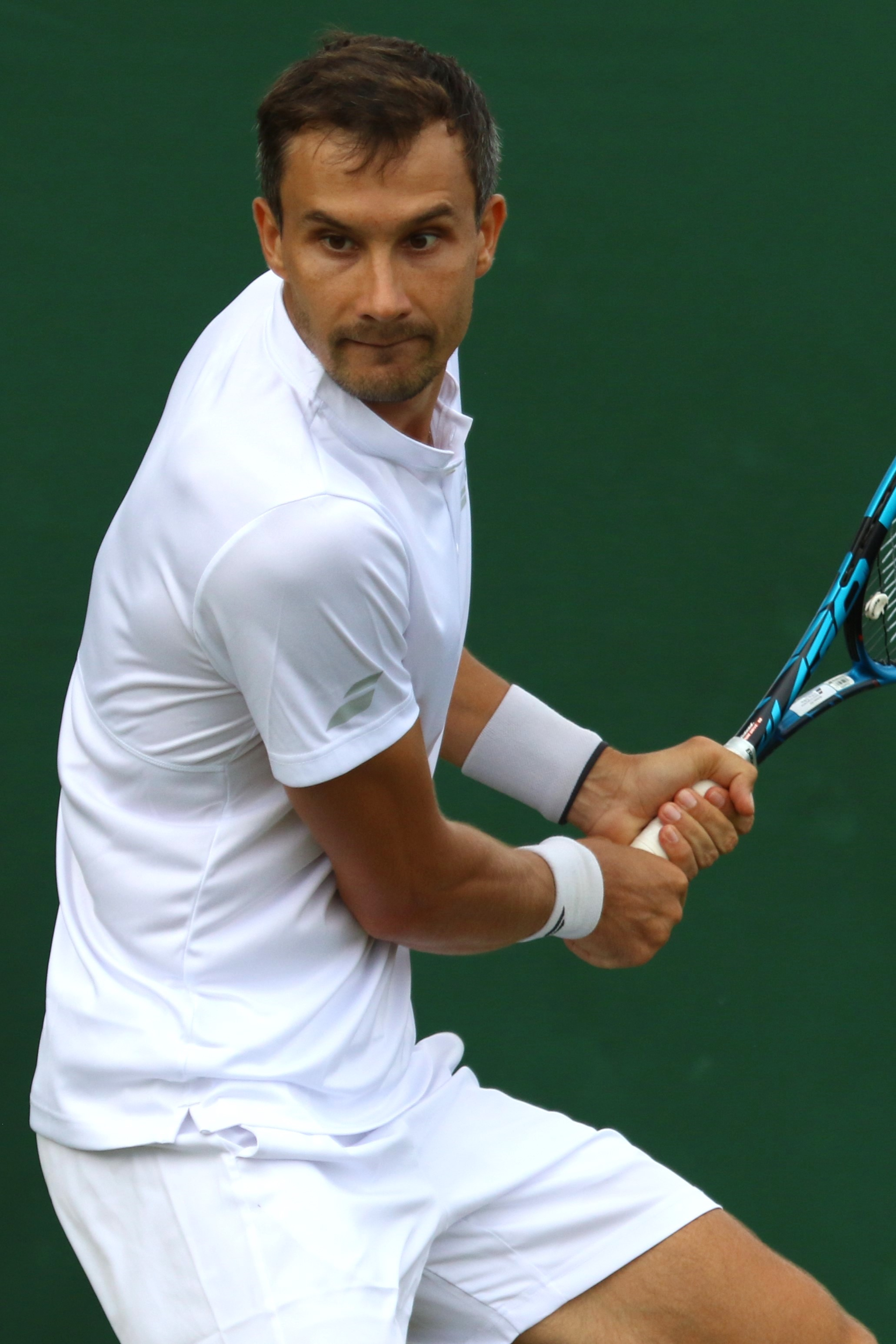
- Donskoy at the 2023 Wimbledon Championships
- Country (sports): Russia
- Residence: Moscow, Russia
- Born: 9 May 1990 (age 36) Moscow, Russian SFSR, Soviet Union
- Height: 1.85 m (6 ft 1 in)
- Turned pro: 2007
- Retired: 2024
- Plays: Right-handed (two-handed backhand)
- Prize money: US $3,426,092

Singles
- Career record: 55–117
- Career titles: 0
- Highest ranking: No. 65 (8 July 2013)

Grand Slam singles results
- Australian Open: 3R (2013)
- French Open: 2R (2013)
- Wimbledon: 1R (2013, 2014, 2016, 2017, 2018)
- US Open: 3R (2013)

Other tournaments
- Olympic Games: 3R (2016)

Doubles
- Career record: 16–34
- Career titles: 0
- Highest ranking: No. 161 (5 November 2012)

Grand Slam doubles results
- French Open: 2R (2018)
- Wimbledon: 1R (2013)

Team competitions
- Davis Cup: W (2021)
Medal record
Summer Universiade
Bronze medal – third place	2009 Belgrade	Singles
- Last updated on: 22 September 2025.

Evgeny Evgenyevich Donskoy (Russian: Евге́ний Евге́ньевич Донско́й, IPA: [jɪvˈɡʲenʲɪj dɐnˈskoj]; born 9 May 1990) is a Russian former professional tennis player. He has a career-high ATP singles ranking of No. 65, achieved on 8 July 2013 and a doubles ranking of No. 161, achieved on 5 November 2012.

== Personal life ==
He was born and currently resides in Moscow, Russia. Donskoy was mentored by former player and two-time Grand Slam champion Marat Safin. His favourite surface is hard courts.

== Career ==
In 2010, Donskoy played doubles with the British player Morgan Phillips at the Seville Challenger, losing in the first round.

By 2013, Marat Safin had built a coaching team for Donskoy that included Morgan Phillips.

Donskoy entered 2013 Australian Open's main draw for the first time, reaching the third round and defeating 23rd seed Mikhail Youzhny en route. He also pushed Andy Murray to three sets in the Indian Wells Masters 1000 event.

Consequently, Donskoy made his Davis Cup debut in Europe/Africa Zone Group I match against Great Britain in Coventry. Donskoy won the first rubber against James Ward, 4–6, 4–6, 7–5, 6–2, 8–6, to help give Russia a 2–0 lead heading into the doubles rubber the following day. Great Britain won the doubles rubber, where Ward opened the day. Ward defeated Dmitry Tursunov, 6–4, 5–7, 5–7, 6–4, 6–4, to level the tie. Dan Evans ranked No. 325 would eventually complete a turnaround, with a straight sets victory over world No. 80 Donskoy.

Also for the first time, Donskoy entered the 2013 French Open's main draw, beating Jan-Lennard Struff in the first round. At the 2013 TOPSHELF Open held in 's-Hertogenbosch, he took out third seed John Isner in the first round and beat Robin Haase in the second to reach his first ATP Tour quarterfinals.

In December 2014, Donskoy decided to join the team of Boris Sobkin, coach of Mikhail Youzhny.

In 2016, Donskoy debuted at the Summer Olympics. He defeated 7th seed David Ferrer in the second round, but then lost to Steve Johnson in the third.

In 2017, Donskoy beat Australian Open champion Roger Federer in the second round of the Dubai Tennis Championships, having saved three match points in the second set, trailing 5–2 in the final set and down 5–1 in the final set tie-breaker. This was Donskoy's first career win over a top-ten player.

At the 2021 US Open he qualified for his ninth consecutive main draw appearance at this Major. He lost to Félix Auger-Aliassime in the first round.

Donskoy retired from professional tennis after the 2024 season and started coaching Karen Khachanov.

== Style of play ==
Donskoy has very powerful, flat groundstrokes, especially his forehand, which can produce spectacular points but also a lot of unforced errors.

== ATP Challenger Tour finals ==
=== Singles: 21 (12 titles, 9 runner-ups) ===
Legend ATP Challenger Tour (12–9)	Finals by surface Hard (10–7) Clay (2–1) Grass (0–1) Carpet (0–0)

Result	W–L	Date	Tournament	Tier	Surface	Opponent	Score
Win	1–0	Feb 2011	Casablanca, Morocco	Challenger	Clay	(Italy) Alessio di Mauro	2–6, 6–3, 6–3
Loss	1–1	Jul 2011	Braunschweig, Germany	Challenger	Clay	(Czech Republic) Lukáš Rosol	5–7, 6–7^{(2–7)}
Win	2–1	Feb 2012	Meknes, Morocco	Challenger	Clay	(Romania) Adrian Ungur	6–1, 6–3
Loss	2–2	Jul 2012	Penza, Russia	Challenger	Hard	(Ukraine) Illya Marchenko	5–7, 3–6
Win	3–2	Jul 2012	Astana, Kazakhstan	Challenger	Hard	(Turkey) Marsel İlhan	6–3, 6–4
Win	4–2	Aug 2012	Segovia, Spain	Challenger	Hard	(France) Albano Olivetti	6–1, 7–6^{(13–11)}
Win	5–2	Nov 2012	Loughborough, United Kingdom	Challenger	Hard (i)	(Germany) Jan-Lennard Struff	6–2, 4–6, 6–1
Win	6–2	Nov 2012	Tyumen, Russia	Challenger	Hard (i)	(Ukraine) Illya Marchenko	6–7^{(6–8)}, 6–3, 6–2
Loss	6–3	Feb 2014	Kolkata, India	Challenger	Hard	(Serbia) Ilija Bozoljac	1–6, 1–6
Loss	6–4	May 2015	Karshi, Uzbekistan	Challenger	Hard	(Russia) Teymuraz Gabashvili	2–5 ret.
Loss	6–5	Aug 2015	Astana, Kazakhstan	Challenger	Hard	(Kazakhstan) Mikhail Kukushkin	2–6, 2–6
Win	7–5	Aug 2015	Segovia, Spain (2)	Challenger	Hard	(Switzerland) Marco Chiudinelli	7–6^{(7–2)}, 6–3
Loss	7–6	Oct 2015	Pune, India	Challenger	Hard	(India) Yuki Bhambri	2–6, 6–7^{(4–7)}
Win	8–6	Apr 2016	Ra'anana, Israel	Challenger	Hard	(Lithuania) Ričardas Berankis	6–4, 6–4
Win	9–6	Jul 2016	Astana, Kazakhstan (2)	Challenger	Hard	(Russia) Konstantin Kravchuk	6–3, 6–3
Win	10–6	Mar 2017	Zhuhai, China	Challenger	Hard	(Italy) Thomas Fabbiano	6–3, 6–4
Loss	10–7	Aug 2017	Chengdu, China	Challenger	Hard	(Chinese Taipei) Lu Yen-hsun	3–6, 4–6
Win	11–7	Oct 2017	Kaohsiung, Chinese Taipei (Taiwan)	Challenger	Hard	(Romania) Marius Copil	7–6^{(7–0)}, 7–5
Loss	11–8	Jun 2019	Nottingham, United Kingdom	Challenger	Grass	(United Kingdom) Daniel Evans	6–7^{(3–7)}, 3–6
Win	12–8	Jul 2019	Nur-Sultan (Astana), Kazakhstan (3)	Challenger	Hard	(United States) Sebastian Korda	7–6^{(7–5)}, 3–6, 6–4
Loss	12–9	Oct 2019	Brest, France	Challenger	Hard (i)	(France) Ugo Humbert	2–6, 3–6

=== Doubles: 5 (3 titles, 2 runner-ups) ===
Legend ATP Challenger Tour (3–2)	Finals by surface Hard (3–0) Clay (0–1) Grass (0–1) Carpet (0–0)

Result	W–L	Date	Tournament	Tier	Surface	Partner	Opponents	Score
Win	1–0	Nov 2011	Geneva, Switzerland	Challenger	Hard (i)	(Russia) Igor Andreev	(United States) James Cerretani (Canada) Adil Shamasdin	7–6^{(7–1)}, 7–6^{(7–2)}
Loss	1–1	Mar 2012	Casablanca, Morocco	Challenger	Clay	(Russia) Andrey Kuznetsov	(Italy) Walter Trusendi (Italy) Matteo Viola	6–1, 6–7^{(5–7)}, [3–10]
Loss	1–2	Jun 2012	Nottingham, United Kingdom	Challenger	Grass	(Russia) Andrey Kuznetsov	(Austria) Martin Fischer (France) Olivier Charroin	4–6, 6–7^{(6–8)}
Win	2–2	Jan 2017	Rennes, France	Challenger	Hard (i)	(Russia) Mikhail Elgin	(Austria) Julian Knowle (United Kingdom) Jonathan Marray	6–4, 3–6, [11–9]
Win	3–2	Aug 2022	Nonthaburi, Thailand	Challenger	Hard	Alibek Kachmazov	(South Korea) Nam Ji-sung (South Korea) Song Min-kyu	6–3, 1–6, [10–7]

== ITF Futures/World Tennis Tour finals ==
=== Singles: 7 (4 titles, 3 runner-ups) ===
Legend ITF Futures/WTT (4–3)	Finals by surface Hard (2–3) Clay (2–0) Grass (0–0) Carpet (0–0)

Result	W–L	Date	Tournament	Tier	Surface	Opponent	Score
Win	1–0	Jun 2008	Ukraine F3, Chornomorsk-Illichevsk	Futures	Clay	(Ukraine) Denys Molchanov	6–7^{(10–12)}, 7–6^{(7–5)}, 6–4
Loss	1–1	Mar 2010	Kazakhstan F1, Astana	Futures	Hard (i)	(Russia) Alexander Kudryavtsev	4–6, 3–6
Win	2–1	Mar 2011	Spain F7, Sabadell	Futures	Clay	(Italy) Simone Vagnozzi	7–5, 7–5
Win	3–1	Mar 2023	M25 New Delhi, India	WTT	Hard	(Japan) Yusuke Takahashi	6–1, 6–3
Win	4–1	Mar 2023	M25 Lucknow, India	WTT	Hard	(Ukraine) Eric Vanshelboim	6–2, 7–5
Loss	4–2	Nov 2023	M25 Hua Hin, Thailand	WTT	Hard	(Portugal) Gonçalo Oliveira	6–4, 2–6, 4–6
Loss	4–3	Jul 2024	M15 Tianjin, China	WTT	Hard	(China) Yi Zhou	3–6, 4–6

=== Doubles: 6 (2 titles, 4 runner-ups) ===
Legend ITF Futures (2–4)	Finals by surface Hard (0–0) Clay (1–3) Grass (0–0) Carpet (1–1)

Result	W–L	Date	Tournament	Tier	Surface	Partner	Opponents	Score
Loss	0–1	Aug 2007	Russia F3, Moscow	Futures	Clay	(Russia) Vladimir Karusevich	(Kazakhstan) Alexey Kedryuk (Russia) Mikhail Elgin	3–6, 0–6
Win	1–1	Apr 2008	Russia F2, Tyumen	Futures	Carpet (i)	(Russia) Danila Arsenov	(Ukraine) Vladyslav Klymenko (Ukraine) Aleksandr Yarmola	7–5, 7–6^{(7–3)}
Loss	1–2	Jun 2008	Ukraine F3, Chornomorsk-Illichevsk	Futures	Clay	(Russia) Victor Kozin	(Ukraine) Denys Molchanov (Ukraine) Artem Smirnov	4–6, 7–6^{(7–3)}, [10–12]
Loss	1–3	Apr 2009	Russia F2, Tyumen	Futures	Carpet (i)	(Russia) Konstantin Kravchuk	(Kazakhstan) Alexey Kedryuk (Russia) Denis Matsukevich	3–6, 7–6^{(9–7)}, [13–15]
Win	2–3	Aug 2009	Russia F3, Moscow	Futures	Clay	(Russia) Ilya Belyaev	(Serbia) David Savić (Russia) Artem Sitak	1–6, 7–6^{(7–5)}, [12–10]
Loss	2–4	Apr 2010	France F7, Grasse	Futures	Clay	(Russia) Ilya Belyaev	(France) Vincent Stouff (France) Olivier Charroin	6–4, 2–6, [3–10]

== Performance timeline ==
Key
W	F	SF	QF	#R	RR	Q#	DNQ	A	NH

(W) winner; (F) finalist; (SF) semifinalist; (QF) quarterfinalist; (#R) rounds 4, 3, 2, 1; (RR) round-robin stage; (Q#) qualification round; (DNQ) did not qualify; (A) absent; (NH) not held; (SR) strike rate (events won / competed); (W–L) win–loss record.
To avoid confusion and double counting, these charts are updated at the conclusion of a tournament or when the player's participation has ended.

Current through the 2022 Australian Open.

=== Singles ===
Tournament	2010	2011	2012	2013	2014	2015	2016	2017	2018	2019	2020	2021	2022	SR	W–L
Grand Slam tournaments
Australian Open	A	Q1	Q1	3R	A	Q1	2R	Q3	2R	2R	1R	Q1	Q1	0 / 5	5–5
French Open	A	Q2	Q1	2R	Q2	Q3	1R	1R	1R	Q1	Q1	Q2	Q1	0 / 4	1–4
Wimbledon	A	A	Q1	1R	1R	Q2	1R	1R	1R	Q2	NH	Q1	A	0 / 5	0–5
US Open	Q1	Q2	A	3R	1R	2R	1R	2R	1R	1R	1R	1R	A	0 / 9	4–9
Win–loss	0–0	0–0	0–0	5–4	0–2	1–1	1–4	1–3	1–4	1–2	0–2	0–1	0–0	0 / 23	10–23

=== Doubles ===
Tournament	2013	2014	2015	2016	2017	2018	2019–2022	SR	W–L
Grand Slam tournaments
Australian Open	A	A	A	A	A	A	A	0 / 0	0–0
French Open	1R	A	A	1R	A	2R	A	0 / 3	1–3
Wimbledon	1R	Q1	A	A	A	A	A	0 / 1	0–1
US Open	A	A	A	A	A	A	A	0 / 0	0–0
Win–loss	0–2	0–0	0–0	0–1	0–0	1–1	0–0	0 / 4	1–4

== National representation ==
=== Davis Cup (5–6) ===
Group membership World Group (0–0) WG Play-off (0–3) Group I (5–3) Group II (0–0) Group III (0–0) Group IV (0–0)	Matches by surface Hard (5–6) Clay (0–0) Grass (0–0) Carpet (0–0)	Matches by Type Singles (3–4) Doubles (2–2)

- ▲ ▼ indicates the outcome of the Davis Cup match followed by the score, date, place of event, the zonal classification and its phase, and the court surface.

Rubber outcome	No.	Rubber	Match type (partner if any)	Opponent nation	Opponent player(s)	Score
▼2–3; 5–7 April 2013; Ricoh Arena, Coventry, Great Britain; Europe/Africa second round; hard(i) surface
Victory	1	II	Singles	(United Kingdom) Great Britain	James Ward	4–6, 4–6, 7–5, 6–3, 8–6
Defeat	2	V	Singles	(United Kingdom) Great Britain	Daniel Evans	4–6, 4–6, 1–6
▲4–1; 12–14 September 2014; Olympic Stadium, Moscow, Russia; Europe/Africa second round play-off; hard(i) surface
Victory	3	II	Singles	Portugal	João Sousa	7–6^{(9–7)}, 6–4, 3–6, 6–1
▲4–1; 6–8 March 2015; Sport Complex Gazprom Dobycha Yamburg, Novy Urengoy, Russia; Europe/Africa first round; hard(i) surface
Defeat	4	I	Singles	Denmark	Frederik Nielsen	6–2, 3–6, 2–6, 6–7^{(5–7)}
▲3–2; 17–19 July 2015; Fetisov Arena, Vladivostok, Russia; Europe/Africa second round; hard(i) surface
Victory	5	III	Doubles (with Konstantin Kravchuk)	Spain	Marc López / David Marrero	4–6, 7–6^{(7–3)}, 5–7, 7–5, 6–4
Victory	6	IV	Singles	Spain	Tommy Robredo	6–3, 5–6, 6–2, 7–6^{(7–3)}
▼1–4; 18–20 September 2015; Baikal-Arena, Irkutsk, Russia; World Group play-offs; hard(i) surface
Defeat	7	III	Doubles (with Konstantin Kravchuk)	Italy	Simone Bolelli / Fabio Fognini	5–7, 6–2, 6–7^{(5–7)}, 6–7^{(2–7)}
▲5–0; 4–6 March 2016; Kazan Tennis Academy, Kazan, Russia; Europe/Africa first round; hard(i) surface
Victory	8	III	Doubles (with Konstantin Kravchuk)	Sweden	Johan Brunström / Robert Lindstedt	6–3, 7–6^{(7–5)}, 6–2
▲3–1; 17–18 September 2016; National Tennis Center, Moscow, Russia; World Group play-offs; hard surface
Defeat	9	II	Singles	Kazakhstan	Mikhail Kukushkin	7–6^{(9–7)}, 2–6, 6–4, 2–6, 2–6
▼1–3; 6–7 April 2018; Luzhniki Small Sports Arena, Moscow, Russia; Europe/Africa second round; hard(i) surface
Defeat	10	IV	Singles	Austria	Jürgen Melzer	3–6, 6–3, 3–6
▲3–1; 1–2 February 2019; Swiss Tennis Arena, Biel/Bienne, Switzerland; qualifying round; hard(i) surface
Defeat	11	III	Doubles (with Andrey Rublev)	Switzerland	Jérôme Kym / Henri Laaksonen	6–4, 3–6, 6–7^{(1–7)}

=== ATP Cup (0–2) ===
Matches by surface
Hard (0–2)
Clay (0–0)
Grass (0–0)

Matches by type
Singles (0–0)
Doubles (0–2)

Rubber outcome	No.	Rubber	Match type (partner if any)	Opponent nation	Opponent player(s)	Score
▲4–2; 2–3 February 2021; Melbourne Park, Melbourne, Australia; group stage; hard surface
Defeat	1	III	Doubles (with Aslan Karatsev)	(Japan)	Ben McLachlan / Yoshihito Nishioka	6–4, 3–6, [10–12]
▲2–1; 6–7 February 2021; Melbourne Park, Melbourne, Australia; Knockout stage; hard surface
Defeat	2	III	Doubles (with Aslan Karatsev)	(Germany)	Kevin Krawietz / Jan-Lennard Struff	3–6, 6–7^{(2–7)}

== Wins over top 10 players ==
#	Player	Rank	Event	Surface	Rd	Score	EDR
2017
1.	(Switzerland) Roger Federer	10	Dubai Tennis Championships, United Arab Emirates	Hard	2R	3–6, 7–6^{(9–7)}, 7–6^{(7–5)}	116

== Record against top 10 players ==
Donskoy's match record against those who have been ranked in the top 10. Players who have been No. 1 are in boldface.

As of 21 July 2021

- (Russia) Mikhail Youzhny 2–1
- (Cyprus) Marcos Baghdatis 1–0
- (Switzerland) **Roger Federer** 1–0
- (Greece) Stefanos Tsitsipas 1–0
- (Austria) Jürgen Melzer 1–1
- (France) Lucas Pouille 1–1
- (Spain) Tommy Robredo 1–1
- (Spain) David Ferrer 1–2
- (United States) John Isner 1–2
- (United States) James Blake 0–1
- (United States) Mardy Fish 0–1
- (France) Richard Gasquet 0–1
- (Belgium) David Goffin 0–1
- (Germany) Tommy Haas 0–1
- (Australia) **Lleyton Hewitt** 0–1
- (United Kingdom) **Andy Murray** 0–1
- (Canada) Milos Raonic 0–1
- (France) Gilles Simon 0–1
- (Austria) Dominic Thiem 0–1
- (Spain) Pablo Carreño Busta 0–2
- (Japan) Kei Nishikori 0–2
- (Germany) Alexander Zverev 0–2
- (Croatia) Marin Čilić 0–3
- (South Africa) Kevin Anderson 0–5

== Team titles ==
2021

- Davis Cup winner with Russia
- ATP Cup winner with Russia

== Awards ==
2019

- The Russian Cup in the nomination **Team of the Year**
