= Guillermo Alcaide =

Spanish tennis player (born 1986)

Guillermo Alcaide Justel
- Country (sports): Spain
- Residence: Sanxenxo, Spain
- Born: 27 May 1986 (age 39) Madrid, Spain
- Turned pro: 2006
- Prize money: $78,873

Singles
- Career record: 0–1
- Career titles: 0
- Highest ranking: No. 195 (1 November 2010)
- Current ranking: No. 220 (14 February 2011)

Grand Slam singles results
- Australian Open: Q1 (2011)
- French Open: Q2 (2010)
- Wimbledon: 1R (2010)
- US Open: Q2 (2010)

Doubles
- Career record: 1–2
- Career titles: 0
- Highest ranking: No. 341 (19 April 2010)
- Last updated on: April 19, 2010.

Guillermo Alcaide Justel (born 27 May 1986) is a Spanish professional tennis player.

== Tour tournament finals ==
=== Titles (5) ===
Legend
ITF Futures Serie (5)

No.	Date	Tournament	Surface	Opponent in the final	Score in the final
1.	11.09.2006	Spain F29, Spain	Clay	(Australia) Paul Baccanello	6–3, 4–6, 4–6
2.	16.04.2007	Spain F14, Spain	Hard	(Spain) Pere Riba	7–6^{(7–4)}, 6–3
3.	04.06.2007	Spain F21, Spain	Carpet	(Australia) Robert Smeets	4–6, 4–6
4.	20.10.2008	France F20, France	Hard	(United Kingdom) James Ward	4–6, 3–6
5.	04.05.2009	Great Britain F6, Great Britain	Clay	(Spain) Andoni Vivanco-Guzmán	6–1, 6–7^{(5–7)}, 7–6^{(7–5)}
6.	25.05.2009	Italy F12, Italy	Clay	(Austria) Rainer Eitzinger	6–2, 6–4
7.	28.12.2009	Brazil F34, Brazil	Clay	(Brazil) Júlio Silva	6–4, 6–2
8.	15.02.2010	Egypt F3, Egypt	Clay	(Egypt) Karim Maamoun	5–7, 3–6
9.	08.03.2010	Portugal F2, Portugal	Hard	(France) Benoît Paire	6–4, 4–6, 6–3
