= Morocco Tennis Tour – Casablanca =

Tournament information
- Event name: Morocco Tennis Tour – Casablanca
- Location: Casablanca, Morocco
- Venue: Ruc Casablanca Tennis Club
- Category: ATP Challenger Tour; ITF Women's Circuit
- Surface: Clay
- Draw: 32S/32Q/16D
- Prize money: ATP €30,000+H; ITF W35
- Website: www.frmt.ma
ATP Tour
- Category: ATP Challenger Tour
- Draw: 32S/32Q/16D
- Prize money: €30,000+H
WTA Tour
- Category: ITF Women's Circuit
- Draw: 32S/64Q/16D
- Prize money: $35,000

The Morocco Tennis Tour – Casablanca is a professional tennis tournament played on outdoor red clay courts. The first edition was held in 2007. three years later from 2011 to 2015 it was part of the ATP Challenger Tour, an annual tennis tournament held in Casablanca, Morocco. In 2024 is currently ITF Women's World Tennis Tour It is a $35k level tournament.

== Past finals ==
=== Women's singles ===
Year	Champion	Runner-up	Score
2026	(Serbia) Luna Vujović	(Spain) Aran Teixidó García	6–4, 6–4
2025	Anastasia Zolotareva	(Morocco) Yasmine Kabbaj	7–6^{(7–1)}, 6–4
2024	(Spain) Andrea Lázaro García	(Spain) Carlota Martínez Círez	7–6^{(7–2)}, 6–3

=== Women's Doubles ===
Year	Champions	Runners-up	Score
2026	(United States) Madison Sieg (Slovakia) Nina Vargová	Elina Nepliy (India) Vasanti Shinde	7–6^{(7–1)}, 6–1
2025	(Japan) Yuki Naito; Ekaterina Reyngold	(Netherlands) Jasmijn Gimbrère (Poland) Zuzanna Pawlikowska	6–7^{(7–2)}, 6–1, [10–3]
2024	(Morocco) Aya El Aouni (Morocco) Malak El Allami	(Switzerland) Chelsea Fontenel (Egypt) Sandra Samir	6–2, 6–2

=== Men's singles ===
Year	Champion	Runner-up	Score	Ref.
2015	(Morocco) Lamine Ouahab	(Spain) Javier Martí	6–0, 7–6^{(8–6)}	
2013	(Austria) Dominic Thiem	(Italy) Potito Starace	6–2, 7–5	
2012	(Slovenia) Aljaž Bedene	(France) Nicolas Devilder	7–6^{(8–6)}, 7–6^{(7–4)}	
2011	(Russia) Evgeny Donskoy	(Italy) Alessio di Mauro	2–6, 6–3, 6–3	
2008–10	Not held			
2007	(Croatia) Marin Čilić	(Italy) Simone Bolelli	4–6, 6–3, 6–4	

=== Men's Doubles ===
Year	Champions	Runners-up	Score
2015	(Lithuania) Laurynas Grigelis (Romania) Adrian Ungur	(Italy) Flavio Cipolla (Italy) Alessandro Motti	3–6, 6–2, [10–5]
2013	(Italy) Claudio Grassi (Italy) Riccardo Ghedin	(Germany) Gero Kretschmer (Germany) Alexander Satschko	6–4, 6–4
2012	(Italy) Walter Trusendi (Italy) Matteo Viola	(Russia) Evgeny Donskoy (Russia) Andrey Kuznetsov	1–6, 7–6^{(7–5)}, [10–3]
2011	(Spain) Guillermo Alcaide (Spain) Adrián Menéndez	(Portugal) Leonardo Tavares (Italy) Simone Vagnozzi	6–2, 6–1
2008–10	Not held		
2007	(Poland) Łukasz Kubot (Austria) Oliver Marach	(Slovakia) Michal Mertiňák (Czech Republic) Robin Vik	6–3, 6–3
