= Claudio Grassi (tennis) =

Italian tennis player

- Country (sports): Italy
- Residence: Carrara, Italy
- Born: 25 July 1985 (age 40) Carrara, Italy
- Height: 1.80 m (5 ft 11 in)
- Turned pro: 2003
- Plays: Right-handed (two-handed backhand)
- Coach: Fabio Gorietti
- Prize money: $146,565

Singles
- Career record: 0–0
- Career titles: 0
- Highest ranking: No. 300 (22 August 2011)

Doubles
- Career record: 0–0
- Career titles: 0
- Highest ranking: No. 126 (7 July 2014)
- Last updated on: 29 December 2013.

Claudio Grassi (born 25 July 1985) is an Italian tennis player playing on the ATP Challenger Tour. On 22 August 2011, he reached his highest ATP singles ranking of World No. 300 and his highest doubles ranking of No. 126, achieved on 7 July 2014.

== Tour titles ==
Legend
Grand Slam (0)
ATP Masters Series (0)
ATP Tour (0)
Challengers (2)

=== Doubles ===
Outcome	No.	Date	Tournament	Surface	Partner	Opponents	Score
Runner-up	1.	8 July 2012	Lima	Clay	(Italy) Luca Vanni	(Argentina) Facundo Argüello (Argentina) Agustín Velotti	6–7 ^{(4–7)}, 6–7 ^{(5–7)}
Runner-up	2.	10 February 2013	Bergamo	Hard	(Israel) Amir Weintraub	(Slovakia) Karol Beck (Slovakia) Andrej Martin	6–3, 3–6, [8–10]
Winner	3.	28 July 2013	Astana	Hard	(Italy) Riccardo Ghedin	(Kazakhstan) Andrey Golubev (Kazakhstan) Mikhail Kukushkin	3–6, 6–3, [10–8]
Winner	4.	3 November 2013	Casablanca	Clay	(Italy) Riccardo Ghedin	(Germany) Gero Kretschmer (Germany) Alexander Satschko	6–4, 6–4
