= Lamine Ouahab =

Moroccan tennis player (born 1984)

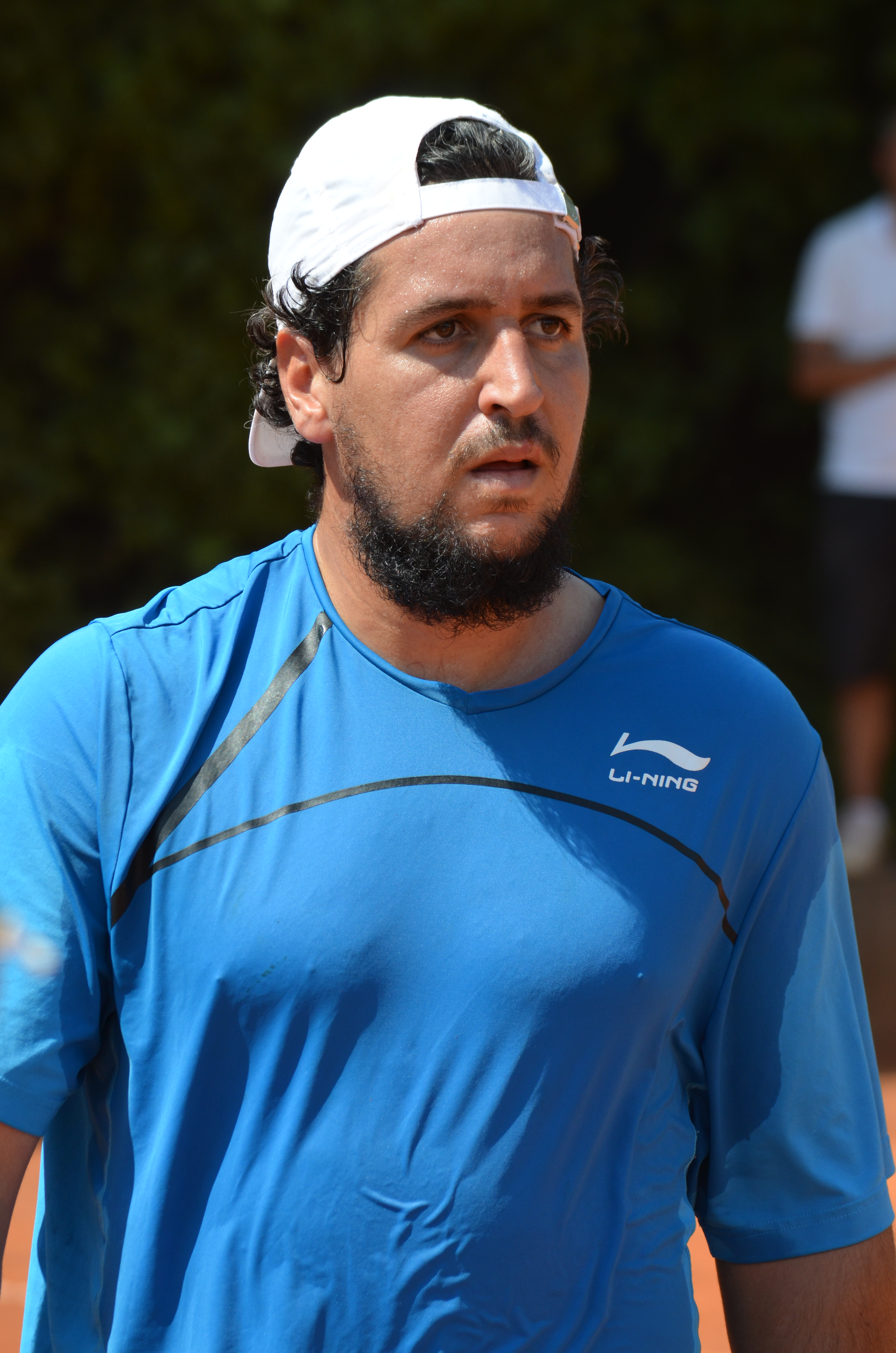
- Country (sports): Algeria (2002–2013); Morocco (2014–present)
- Residence: Barcelona, Spain
- Born: 22 December 1984 (age 41) Algiers, Algeria
- Height: 1.85 m (6 ft 1 in)
- Turned pro: 2002
- Plays: Right-handed (two-handed backhand)
- Coach: Daouadji Ouassini
- Prize money: $ 483,336

Singles
- Career record: 20–20 (at ATP Tour and Grand Slam-level, and in Davis Cup)
- Career titles: 0
- Highest ranking: No. 114 (21 September 2009)

Grand Slam singles results
- Australian Open: 1R (2009)
- French Open: Q3 (2009)
- Wimbledon: Q2 (2007)
- US Open: Q1 (2006, 2008)

Other tournaments
- Olympic Games: 1R (2004)

Doubles
- Career record: 9–14 (at ATP Tour and Grand Slam-level, and in Davis Cup)
- Career titles: 0
- Highest ranking: No. 122 (19 November 2007)

Team competitions
- Davis Cup: 35–13
Medal record
Representing Algeria
Mediterranean Games
Silver medal – second place	2005 Almería	Doubles
All-Africa Games
Gold medal – first place	2007 Algiers	Singles
Gold medal – first place	2007 Algiers	Doubles
Gold medal – first place	2007 Algiers	Team Event
Representing Morocco
Mediterranean Games
Gold medal – first place	2018 Tarragona	Singles
All-Africa Games
Gold medal – first place	2019 Rabat	Team Event
Silver medal – second place	2019 Rabat	Doubles
- Last updated on: 3 April 2023.

Lamine Ouahab (Arabic: الأمين وهاب al-ʼAmīn Wahhāb) (born 22 December 1984) is a Moroccan retired professional tennis player.

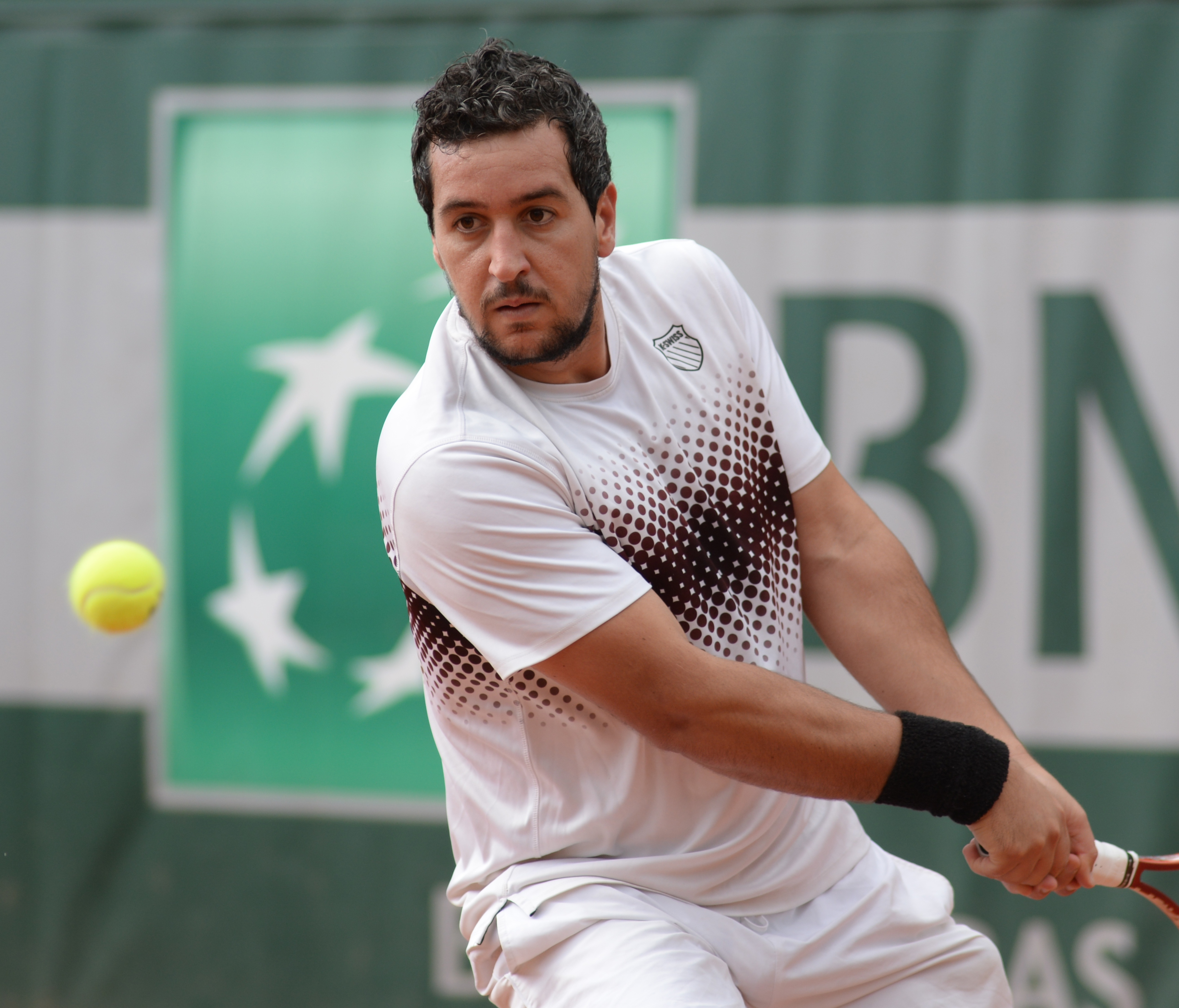
Lamine Ouahab

== Career ==
=== Juniors ===
As a junior, Ouahab reached as high as No. 4 in singles in January 2002 (and No. 18 in doubles), compiling a singles win–loss record of 92–24. He reached the boys' singles final of Wimbledon in 2002, defeating Rafael Nadal en route before losing to Todd Reid.

=== Pro tour ===
Ouahab turned professional in 2002 at the age of 17.

Due to his junior success, he got a wild card into the 2004 Summer Olympics main draw. He lost in the first round to 15th seed Tommy Robredo.

Ouahab made his ATP debut in 2006 at the Grand Prix Hassan II in Morocco after receiving a wildcard into the main draw. He lost in the first round to Florian Mayer.

In 2009, Ouahab qualified for his first and only grand slam tournament at the Australian Open. He lost in the first round to Florian Mayer. It was also in 2009 that he reached his career-high ranking of No. 114 on 21 September 2009 which is also the highest ranked any Algerian player has been in history.

In late 2013, Ouahab acquired a Moroccan passport and officially stopped representing Algeria and started representing Morocco.

At the 2015 Grand Prix Hassan II, Ouahab made his only ATP quarterfinal after defeating 1st seed and world number 24 Guillermo García López in the second round. He lost to Daniel Gimeno Traver.

At the 2018 Grand Prix Hassan II, ranked No. 617 Ouahab upset the 3rd seed and world number 34 Philipp Kohlschreiber in the first round. He lost in the second round to Nikoloz Basilashvili.

=== Davis Cup ===
As a member of the Algerian Davis Cup team, Ouahab posted a 17–3 record in singles and an 8–1 record in doubles.

As a member of the Moroccan Davis Cup team, he posted a 7–5 record in singles and a 3–4 record in doubles. These records add up to overall records of 24–8 in singles, 11–5 in doubles, and 35–13 overall.

== Junior Grand Slam finals ==
=== Singles: 1 (1 runner-up) ===
Result	Year	Tournament	Surface	Opponent	Score
Loss	2002	Wimbledon	Grass	(Australia) Todd Reid	6–7^{(5–7)}, 4–6

== Performance timeline ==
Key
W	F	SF	QF	#R	RR	Q#	P#	DNQ	A	Z#	PO	G	S	B	NMS	NTI	P	NH

(W) winner; (F) finalist; (SF) semifinalist; (QF) quarterfinalist; (#R) rounds 4, 3, 2, 1; (RR) round-robin stage; (Q#) qualification round; (P#) preliminary round; (DNQ) did not qualify; (A) absent; (Z#) Davis/Fed Cup Zonal Group (with number indication) or (PO) play-off; (G) gold, (S) silver or (B) bronze Olympic/Paralympic medal; (NMS) not a Masters tournament; (NTI) not a Tier I tournament; (P) postponed; (NH) not held; (SR) strike rate (events won / competed); (W–L) win–loss record.

=== Singles ===
Tournament	2004	2005	2006	2007	2008	2009	2010	2011	2012	2013	2014	2015	SR	W–L	Win%
Grand Slam tournaments
Australian Open	A	A	A	A	A	1R	A	A	A	A	A	A	0 / 1	0–1	0%
French Open	A	A	A	Q1	A	Q3	Q1	A	A	A	A	Q1	0 / 0	0–0	–
Wimbledon	A	A	Q1	Q2	A	Q1	A	A	A	A	A	A	0 / 0	0–0	–
US Open	A	A	Q1	A	Q1	A	A	A	A	A	A	A	0 / 0	0–0	–
Win–loss	0–0	0–0	0–0	0–0	0–0	0–1	0–0	0–0	0–0	0–0	0–0	0–0	0 / 1	0–1	0%
Olympic Games
Summer Olympics	1R	Not Held			A	Not Held			A	Not Held			0 / 1	0–1	0%
ATP Tour Masters 1000
Madrid	A	A	A	A	A	Q1	A	A	A	A	A	A	0 / 0	0–0	–
Paris	A	A	A	A	A	Q1	A	A	A	A	A	A	0 / 0	0–0	–
Win–loss	0–0	0–0	0–0	0–0	0–0	0–0	0–0	0–0	0–0	0–0	0–0	0–0	0 / 0	0–0	–

== ATP Challenger and ITF Futures finals ==
=== Singles: 58 (36–22) ===
Legend ATP Challenger (3–4) ITF Futures (33–18)	Finals by surface Hard (1–4) Clay (35–18) Grass (0–0) Carpet (0–0)

Result	W–L	Date	Tournament	Tier	Surface	Opponent	Score
Loss	0–1	Nov 2002	Jamaica F19, Montego Bay	Futures	Hard	(Netherlands Antilles) Jean-Julien Rojer	4–6, 1–6
Loss	0–2	Apr 2003	Algeria F1, Algiers	Futures	Clay	(Slovakia) Boris Borgula	6–7^{(4–7)}, 4–6
Win	1–2	May 2003	Algeria F3, Algiers	Futures	Clay	(Croatia) Saša Tuksar	6–4, 6–2
Loss	1–3	Jun 2003	Spain F11, Lanzarote	Futures	Hard	(Spain) Santiago Ventura	6–7^{(2–7)}, 6–2, 6–7^{(4–7)}
Loss	1–4	Nov 2003	USA F31, Honolulu	Futures	Hard	(United States) Todd Widom	6–3, 3–6, 4–6
Win	2–4	Dec 2003	Iran F4, Kish Island	Futures	Clay	(Germany) Sebastian Fitz	6–4, 5–7, 6–1
Win	3–4	Apr 2004	Greece F2, Syros	Futures	Hard	(Czech Republic) Pavel Šnobel	6–4, 6–4
Win	4–4	May 2005	Morocco F3, Agadir	Futures	Clay	(United States) Tres Davis	6–1, 6–2
Win	5–4	May 2005	Morocco F4, Marrakesh	Futures	Clay	(Slovakia) Lukáš Lacko	4–6, 6–3, 6–2
Win	6–4	Jun 2005	Morocco F5, Khemisset	Futures	Clay	(Morocco) Talal Ouahabi	7–6^{(7–4)}, 6–1
Win	7–4	Sep 2005	Algeria F1, Algiers	Futures	Clay	(Slovakia) Filip Polášek	6–3, 6–0
Win	8–4	Sep 2005	Algeria F2, Algiers	Futures	Clay	(Algeria) Slimane Saoudi	6–4, 6–3
Loss	8–5	Sep 2005	Algeria F3, Algiers	Futures	Clay	(Algeria) Slimane Saoudi	4–6, 6–3, 2–6
Loss	8–6	Nov 2005	Tunisia F5, Monastir	Futures	Hard	(Germany) Tony Holzinger	6–7^{(1–7)}, 4–6
Win	9–6	Apr 2006	Morocco F5, Rabat	Futures	Clay	(Portugal) Fred Gil	6–4, 6–3
Win	10–6	May 2006	Tunis, Tunisia	Challenger	Clay	(Morocco) Younes El Aynaoui	walkover
Win	11–6	Jul 2006	Montauban, France	Challenger	Clay	(France) Marc Gicquel	7–5, 3–6, 7–6^{(7–2)}
Win	12–6	May 2007	Algeria F2, Algiers	Futures	Clay	(Morocco) Reda El Amrani	6–4, 6–3
Loss	12–7	Jan 2008	Spain F2, Mallorca	Futures	Clay	(Spain) Carles Poch Gradin	6–3, 4–6, 4–6
Loss	12–8	Mar 2008	Morocco F1, Oujda	Futures	Clay	(Belgium) Jeroen Masson	2–6, 0–3 ret.
Loss	12–9	Sep 2008	Naples, Italy	Challenger	Clay	(Italy) Tomas Tenconi	7–6^{(8–6)}, 3–6, 1–6
Win	13–9	Oct 2008	Morocco F6, Khemisset	Futures	Clay	(Czech Republic) Jan Mertl	6–4, 6–4
Win	14–9	Oct 2008	Morocco F7, Casablanca	Futures	Clay	(France) J. Dasnieres De Veigy	6–4, 6–3
Win	15–9	Feb 2009	Morocco F1, Casablanca	Futures	Clay	(France) Éric Prodon	6–3, 6–1
Win	16–9	Feb 2009	Morocco F2, Rabat	Futures	Clay	(France) Éric Prodon	7–5, 7–5
Loss	16–10	Mar 2009	Marrakesh, Morocco	Challenger	Clay	(Brazil) Marcos Daniel	6–4, 5–7, 2–6
Loss	16–11	Sep 2009	Trnava, Slovakia	Challenger	Clay	(Ukraine) Alexandr Dolgopolov	2–6, 2–6
Win	17–11	Feb 2010	Morocco F2, Rabat	Futures	Clay	(France) Laurent Rochette	6–3, 6–3
Loss	17–12	Apr 2010	Rome, Italy	Challenger	Clay	(Italy) Filippo Volandri	4–6, 5–7
Loss	17–13	May 2012	Morocco F1, Kenitra	Futures	Clay	(Chile) Hans Podlipnik Castillo	4–6, 1–6
Win	18–13	Jun 2012	Morocco F2, Rabat	Futures	Clay	(Belgium) Yannik Reuter	6–2, 6–3
Win	19–13	Jun 2012	Morocco F3, Casablanca	Futures	Clay	(Morocco) Mehdi Ziadi	6–0, 6–2
Loss	19–14	Oct 2012	Morocco F6, Casablanca	Futures	Clay	(Romania) Victor Crivoi	3–6, 6–1, 4–6
Loss	19–15	Oct 2012	Morocco F7, Casablanca	Futures	Clay	(Romania) Victor Crivoi	0–6, 3–6
Loss	19–16	Jun 2013	Morocco F1, Casablanca	Futures	Clay	(Italy) Gianluigi Quinzi	6–7^{(2–7)}, 6–1, 4–6
Win	20–16	Jun 2013	Morocco F2, Casablanca	Futures	Clay	(France) Alexis Musialek	6–3, 6–4
Loss	20–17	Jun 2013	Morocco F3, Mohammedia	Futures	Clay	(Sweden) Markus Eriksson	2–6, 3–6
Win	21–17	Sep 2013	Morocco F4, Agadir	Futures	Clay	(Slovakia) Filip Krajinović	6–1, 7–6^{(7–2)}
Win	22–17	Oct 2013	Morocco F5, Taroudant	Futures	Clay	(Slovakia) Filip Krajinović	6–7^{(5–7)}, 6–4, 6–1
Loss	22–18	Oct 2013	Spain F36, El Prat de Llobregat	Futures	Clay	(France) Tak Khunn Wang	6–4, 3–6, 3–6
Win	23–18	Mar 2014	Croatia F5, Umag	Futures	Clay	(Italy) Simone Vagnozzi	6–0, 6–7^{(6–8)}, 6–3
Win	24–18	Jan 2015	Casablanca, Morocco	Challenger	Clay	(Spain) Javier Martí	6–0, 7–6^{(8–6)}
Win	25–18	Mar 2015	Morocco F1, Casablanca	Futures	Clay	(Spain) Javier Martí	6–3, 6–3
Win	26–18	Mar 2015	Morocco F2, Casablanca	Futures	Clay	(France) Maxime Hamou	6–0, 7–6^{(7–3)}
Win	27–18	Apr 2015	Morocco F3, Safi	Futures	Clay	(Spain) Marc Giner	7–6^{(7–4)}, 6–3
Win	28–18	Mar 2016	Morocco F2, Beni Mellal	Futures	Clay	(Canada) Steven Diez	6–2, 4–6, 6–2
Win	29–18	Mar 2016	Morocco F3, Khouribga	Futures	Clay	(France) Maxime Hamou	6–3, 6–3
Win	30–18	Jun 2016	France F11, Toulon	Futures	Clay	(France) Laurent Lokoli	6–3, 7–6^{(7–3)}
Win	31–18	Nov 2016	Morocco F8, Casablanca	Futures	Clay	(Spain) Álvaro López San Martín	6–4, 6–3
Win	32–18	Nov 2016	Morocco F9, Rabat	Futures	Clay	(Spain) Álvaro López San Martín	3–6, 7–5, 6–4
Loss	32–19	Apr 2017	Tunisia F12, Hammamet	Futures	Clay	(Spain) Pol Toledo Bagué	6–2, 6–7^{(7–9)}, 3–6
Loss	32–20	Apr 2017	Tunisia F16, Hammamet	Futures	Clay	(Spain) Pedro Martínez	3–6, 3–6
Loss	32–21	Nov 2017	Morocco F4, Casablanca	Futures	Clay	(Lithuania) Laurynas Grigelis	6–4, 2–6, 5–7
Win	33–21	Jul 2018	Morocco F1, Khemisset	Futures	Clay	(Argentina) Juan Pablo Paz	2–6, 6–0, 6–1
Loss	33–22	Jul 2018	Morocco F2, Meknes	Futures	Clay	(France) Arthur Rinderknech	6–4, 5–7, 3–6
Win	34–22	Aug 2018	Morocco F3, Tanger	Futures	Clay	(Argentina) Franco Capalbo	6–4, 6–2
Win	35–22	Jul 2019	M15 Tanger, Morocco	World Tennis Tour	Clay	(France) Matthieu Perchicot	6–0, 6–2
Win	36–22	Aug 2019	M15 Agadir, Morocco	World Tennis Tour	Clay	(Argentina) Nicolas Alberto Arreche	5–7, 6–4, 6–1

=== Doubles: 33 (19–14) ===
Legend ATP Challenger (3–1) ITF Futures (16–13)	Finals by surface Hard (0–1) Clay (19–13) Grass (0–0) Carpet (0–0)

Result	W–L	Date	Tournament	Tier	Surface	Partner	Opponents	Score
Win	1–0	Jul 2004	France F10, Bourg-en-Bresse	Futures	Clay	(Argentina) Brian Dabul	(Italy) Diego Álvarez (Italy) Giuseppe Menga	6–4, 6–3
Loss	1–1	Nov 2004	Iran F3, Kish Island	Futures	Clay	(Italy) Manuel Jorquera	(Chile) Juan Ignacio Cerda (Netherlands) Jasper Smit	walkover
Loss	1–2	May 2007	Tunis, Tunisia	Challenger	Clay	(Spain) Marc Fornell Mestres	(Poland) Łukasz Kubot (Austria) Oliver Marach	2–6, 2–6
Win	2–2	May 2007	Algeria F2, Algiers	Futures	Clay	(Algeria) Mohamed Ouahab	(Egypt) Motaz Abou El Khair (Morocco) Rabie Chaki	6–3, 6–2
Win	3–2	Jul 2007	Reggio Emilia, Italy	Challenger	Clay	(Brazil) Franco Ferreiro	(Uruguay) Pablo Cuevas (Argentina) Horacio Zeballos	6–4, 1–6, [10–4]
Win	4–2	Aug 2007	Vigo, Spain	Challenger	Clay	(Italy) Leonardo Azzaro	(Spain) Pablo Santos (Netherlands) Igor Sijsling	2–6, 6–4, [10–7]
Win	5–2	Oct 2008	Morocco F6, Khemisset	Futures	Clay	(Morocco) Talal Ouahabi	(Morocco) Mohamed Saber (Morocco) Mehdi Ziadi	6–2, 6–1
Win	6–2	Feb 2009	Morocco F2, Rabat	Futures	Clay	(Tunisia) Malek Jaziri	(Morocco) Omar Erramy (Morocco) Younès Rachidi	6–1, 6–3
Win	7–2	Mar 2009	Meknes, Morocco	Challenger	Clay	(Spain) Marc López	(Italy) Alessio di Mauro (Italy) Giancarlo Petrazzuolo	6–3, 7–5
Loss	7–3	Feb 2010	Morocco F2, Rabat	Futures	Clay	(Tunisia) Malek Jaziri	(Serbia) David Savić (United States) Denis Zivkovic	4–6, 1–6
Loss	7–4	May 2012	Morocco F1, Kenitra	Futures	Clay	(Morocco) Younès Rachidi	(Belgium) Germain Gigounon (Belgium) Yannik Reuter	3–6, 7–5, [6–10]
Win	8–4	Jun 2012	Morocco F3, Casablanca	Futures	Clay	(Morocco) Younès Rachidi	(Austria) Sebastian Bader (Austria) Lukas Koncilia	6–0, 6–2
Win	9–4	Oct 2012	Morocco F6, Casablanca	Futures	Clay	(Romania) Victor Crivoi	(Germany) Steven Moneke (Germany) Marc Sieber	6–1, 3–6, [10–6]
Win	10–4	Jun 2013	Morocco F1, Casablanca	Futures	Clay	(Morocco) Younès Rachidi	(Sweden) Markus Eriksson (Sweden) Milos Sekulic	6–3, 6–2
Loss	10–5	Oct 2013	Morocco F5, Taroudant	Futures	Clay	(Morocco) Younès Rachidi	(Germany) Steven Moneke (Germany) Nils Langer	2–6, 4–6
Loss	10–6	Nov 2014	Morocco F5, Casablanca	Futures	Clay	(Morocco) Mohamed Saber	(Germany) Jean-Marc Werner (Spain) Oriol Roca Batalla	6–3, 3–6, [4–10]
Win	11–6	Nov 2014	Morocco F6, Casablanca	Futures	Clay	(Morocco) Mohamed Saber	(Poland) Piotr Baranski (Poland) Bartosz Wojnar	7–5, 4–6, [12–10]
Win	12–6	Mar 2016	Morocco F1, Agadir	Futures	Clay	(Spain) Marc Fornell Mestres	(Switzerland) Jacob Kahoun (Spain) Marcos Giraldi Requena	6–7^{(4–7)}, 6–4, [13–11]
Win	13–6	Mar 2016	Morocco F2, Beni Mellal	Futures	Clay	(Spain) Marc Fornell Mestres	(Italy) Filippo Leonardi (Italy) Fabio Mercuri	6–3, 7–5
Loss	13–7	Jun 2016	Spain F16, Huelva	Futures	Clay	(Belgium) Niels Desein	(Spain) Ivan Arenas-Gualda (Spain) David Vega Hernández	4–6, 2–6
Win	14–7	Jun 2016	France F11, Toulon	Futures	Clay	(Spain) Pedro Martínez	(France) Ronan Joncour (France) Yanais Laurent	6–3, 6–7^{(4–7)}, [12–10]
Loss	14–8	Jul 2016	France F12, Montauban	Futures	Clay	(Spain) Pedro Martínez	(Bosnia and Herzegovina) Tomislav Brkić (Brazil) Caio Zampieri	1–6, 2–6
Loss	14–9	Jul 2016	France F13, Bourg-en-Bresse	Futures	Clay	(Spain) Marc Fornell Mestres	(United States) Cătălin Gârd (Philippines) Ruben Gonzales	6–2, 3–6, [7–10]
Loss	14–10	Nov 2016	Morocco F9, Rabat	Futures	Clay	(Spain) Marcos Giraldi Requena	(Russia) Ivan Gakhov (Spain) Paco Climent Gregori	6–2, 4–6, [13–15]
Win	15–10	Apr 2017	Tunisia F12, Hammamet	Futures	Clay	(Portugal) Gonçalo Oliveira	(Argentina) Juan Ignacio Galarza (Chile) Cristóbal Saavedra Corvalán	6–1, 6–1
Win	16–10	Apr 2017	Tunisia F14, Hammamet	Futures	Clay	(France) Antoine Hoang	(Bosnia and Herzegovina) Nerman Fatić (Italy) Davide Galoppini	6–3, 6–4
Win	17–10	Nov 2017	Morocco F4, Casablanca	Futures	Clay	(Morocco) Amine Ahouda	(Lithuania) Laurynas Grigelis (France) Laurent Rochette	6–2, 3–6, [10–6]
Loss	17–11	Nov 2017	Morocco F5, Beni Mellal	Futures	Clay	(Morocco) Amine Ahouda	(Spain) Javier Barranco Cosano (Italy) Raúl Brancaccio	6–2, 2–6, [4–10]
Loss	17–12	Aug 2018	Morocco F3, Tanger	Futures	Clay	(Switzerland) Adam Moundir	(Argentina) Manuel Barros (Argentina) Tomás Lipovšek Puches	3–6, 1–6
Loss	17–13	Mar 2019	M15 Faro, Portugal	World Tennis Tour	Hard	(Spain) Álvaro López San Martín	(Portugal) Fred Gil (Argentina) Manuel Pena Lopez	2–6, 4–6
Win	18–13	Aug 2019	M15 Agadir, Morocco	World Tennis Tour	Clay	(Morocco) Adam Moundir	(Argentina) Nicolas Alberto Arreche (Italy) Nicolo Turchetti	2–6, 6–1, [10–6]
Win	19–13	Feb 2020	M15 Paguera, Spain	World Tennis Tour	Clay	(Morocco) Anas Fattar	(Italy) Alessandro Ceppellini (Italy) Alexander Weis	6–3, 7–6^{(9–7)}
Loss	19–14	Sep 2022	M25 Madrid, Spain	World Tennis Tour	Clay	(Morocco) Mohammed Nazim Makhlouf	(United Kingdom) Scott Duncan (United Kingdom) Marcus Willis	1–6, 3–6
