= Younès Rachidi =

Moroccan tennis player

- Full name: Younès Rachidi
- Country (sports): Morocco
- Born: 13 September 1986 (age 39)
- Retired: 2017 (last match)
- Plays: Right-handed (two handed-backhand)
- Prize money: $53,102

Singles
- Career record: 2–2 (at ATP Tour level, Grand Slam level, and in Davis Cup)
- Career titles: 0
- Highest ranking: No. 753 (14 October 2013)

Doubles
- Career record: 3–6 (at ATP Tour level, Grand Slam level, and in Davis Cup)
- Career titles: 5 ITF
- Highest ranking: No. 473 (18 November 2013)
Medal record
Representing Morocco
Men's Tennis
Pan Arab Games
| Bronze medal – third place | 2011 Doha | Team Event |
- Last updated on: 6 April 2015.

Younès Rachidi (born 13 September 1986) is a Moroccan former tennis player.

Rachidi has a career high ATP singles ranking of 753 achieved on 14 October 2013. He also has a career high ATP doubles ranking of 473 achieved also on 18 November 2013.

== Career ==
Rachidi made his ATP main draw debut in the doubles event of the 2012 Grand Prix Hassan II. At the 2015 Grand Prix Hassan II, Rachidi reached the semifinals of the doubles event partnering Lamine Ouahab.

Playing for Morocco in Davis Cup, Rachidi has a W/L record of 5–4.
