= 2013 Morocco Tennis Tour – Meknes – Singles =

Meknes – Singles
- 2013 Morocco Tennis Tour – Meknes

Final
- Champion: (Germany) Cedrik-Marcel Stebe
- Runner-up: (Belgium) Yannik Reuter
- Score: 6–1, 4–6, 6–2

Events
Singles	Doubles
← 2012 ·	Morocco Tennis Tour – Meknes	· 2014 →

Cedrik-Marcel Stebe won the title, beating Yannik Reuter 6–1, 4–6, 6–2

== Seeds ==
1. (France) David Guez (second round)
2. (Italy) Thomas Fabbiano (second round)
3. (Germany) Cedrik-Marcel Stebe (champion)
4. (France) Florent Serra (first round)
5. (France) Lucas Pouille (first round)
6. (Austria) Dominic Thiem (first round)
7. (Spain) Jordi Samper Montaña (quarterfinals)
8. (Canada) Steven Diez (quarterfinals)

== Draw ==
=== Key ===
- Q = Qualifier
- WC = Wild card
- LL = Lucky loser
- Alt = Alternate
- SE = Special exempt
- PR = Protected ranking
- ITF = ITF entry
- JE = Junior exempt
- w/o = Walkover
- r = Retired
- d = Defaulted
- SR = Special ranking

=== Finals ===
Semifinals
(Belgium) Kimmer Coppejans	2	2
3	(Germany) Cedrik-Marcel Stebe	6	6
Q	(France) Laurent Lokoli	4	7^{7}	2
(Belgium) Yannik Reuter	6	6^{5}	6

Final
3	(Germany) Cedrik-Marcel Stebe	6	4	6
(Belgium) Yannik Reuter	1	6	2

=== Top half ===
First round
1	(France) D Guez	6	1
Alt	(Italy) D Giorgini	4	1^{r}
(Italy) A Giannessi	4	6	4
(Belgium) K Coppejans	6	4	6
Q	(Austria) Lukas Jastraunig	7^{8}	4	4
LL	(Serbia) M Janković	6^{6}	6	6
(Spain) J Lizariturry	6	7^{7}
5	(France) L Pouille	4	6^{5}
3	(Germany) C-M Stebe	6	6
Q	(France) Michael Bois	2	4
WC	(Morocco) Y Rachidi	2	1
(Italy) R Marcora	6	6
Q	(Austria) Marc Rath	6	6
WC	(Morocco) M Ziadi	0	3
(Slovakia) Adrian Sikora	2	6	3
8	(Canada) S Diez	6	4	6

Second round
1	(France) D Guez	6	5	3
(Belgium) K Coppejans	1	7	6
LL	(Serbia) M Janković	6	4	4
(Spain) J Lizariturry	1	6	6
3	(Germany) C-M Stebe	6	6
(Italy) R Marcora	2	3
Q	(Austria) M Rath	6^{3}	6	1
8	(Canada) S Diez	7^{7}	4	6

Quarterfinals
(Belgium) K Coppejans	6	6
(Spain) J Lizariturry	3	1
3	(Germany) C-M Stebe	6	7
8	(Canada) S Diez	1	5

Semifinals
(Belgium) K Coppejans	2	2
3	(Germany) C-M Stebe	6	6

=== Bottom half ===
First round
6	(Austria) D Thiem	3	6	5
(Austria) G Melzer	6	3	7
(Spain) G Granollers	5	4
(Chile) H Podlipnik Castillo	7	6
(Belgium) A De Greef	4	7^{7}	2
(Belgium) G Gigounon	6	6^{4}	6
Q	(France) L Lokoli	6	1	6
4	(France) F Serra	4	6	3
7	(Spain) J Samper Montaña	6	6
WC	(Morocco) H Khaddari	4	4
WC	(Morocco) Y Idmbarek	2	4
(Italy) G Naso	6	6
(Belgium) Yannik Reuter	6	5	6
(France) G Burquier	3	7	1
(Germany) Steven Moneke	5	2
2	(Italy) T Fabbiano	7	6

Second round
(Austria) G Melzer	7	2	6
(Chile) H Podlipnik Castillo	5	6	2
(Belgium) G Gigounon	1	3
Q	(France) L Lokoli	6	6
7	(Spain) J Samper Montaña	3	7^{7}	6
(Italy) G Naso	6	6^{4}	4
(Belgium) Y Reuter	7	7^{7}
2	(Italy) T Fabbiano	5	6^{2}

Quarterfinals
(Austria) G Melzer	3	6^{6}
Q	(France) L Lokoli	6	7^{8}
7	(Spain) J Samper Montaña	2	4
(Belgium) Y Reuter	6	6

Semifinals
Q	(France) L Lokoli	4	7^{7}	2
(Belgium) Y Reuter	6	6^{5}	6
