= 2012 Morocco Tennis Tour – Meknes – Singles =

Meknes – Singles
- 2012 Morocco Tennis Tour – Meknes

Final
- Champion: (Russia) Evgeny Donskoy
- Runner-up: (Romania) Adrian Ungur
- Score: 6–1, 6–3

Events
Singles	Doubles
← 2011 ·	Morocco Tennis Tour – Meknes	· 2013 →

Jaroslav Pospíšil is the defending champion.
Evgeny Donskoy won the title after defeating Adrian Ungur 6–1, 6–3 in the final.

== Seeds ==
1. (Romania) Adrian Ungur (final)
2. (Austria) Andreas Haider-Maurer (quarterfinals, retired due to flu)
3. (Russia) Evgeny Donskoy (champion)
4. (Spain) Daniel Muñoz de la Nava (first round)
5. (Czech Republic) Jan Hájek (semifinals)
6. (Italy) Matteo Viola (first round)
7. (Spain) Pablo Carreño Busta (first round)
8. (Czech Republic) Ivo Minář (quarterfinals)

== Draw ==
=== Key ===
- Q = Qualifier
- WC = Wild card
- LL = Lucky loser
- Alt = Alternate
- SE = Special exempt
- PR = Protected ranking
- ITF = ITF entry
- JE = Junior exempt
- w/o = Walkover
- r = Retired
- d = Defaulted
- SR = Special ranking

=== Finals ===
Semifinals
1	(Romania) Adrian Ungur	6	6
(Portugal) João Sousa	4	2
3	(Russia) Evgeny Donskoy	6	6
5	(Czech Republic) Jan Hájek	4	4

Final
1	(Romania) Adrian Ungur	1	3
3	(Russia) Evgeny Donskoy	6	6

=== Top half ===
First round
1	(Romania) A Ungur	6	6
(Italy) A di Mauro	2	4
Q	(Germany) B Knittel	7^{7}	6
(Croatia) F Škugor	6^{0}	3
(Spain) I Cervantes Huegun	6	6
Q	(Spain) G Granollers	3	1
(Czech Republic) D Lojda	7^{7}	2	6
7	(Spain) P Carreño Busta	6^{4}	6	3
4	(Spain) D Muñoz de la Nava	6	4	5
(Czech Republic) J Pospíšil	2	6	7
(Spain) A Menéndez Maceiras	4	6	2
(Portugal) J Sousa	6	3	6
(Spain) I Navarro	6	6
WC	(Morocco) Y Rachidi	0	2
WC	(Morocco) Y Idmbarek	7	4	2
8	(Czech Republic) I Minář	5	6	6

Second round
1	(Romania) A Ungur	6	0	6
Q	(Germany) B Knittel	3	6	4
(Spain) I Cervantes Huegun	7^{7}	7^{7}
(Czech Republic) D Lojda	6^{5}	6^{3}
(Czech Republic) J Pospíšil	3	4
(Portugal) J Sousa	6	6
(Spain) I Navarro	6^{5}	1
8	(Czech Republic) I Minář	7^{7}	6

Quarterfinals
1	(Romania) A Ungur	6	6
(Spain) I Cervantes Huegun	4	4
(Portugal) J Sousa	4	7^{10}	7
8	(Czech Republic) I Minář	6	6^{8}	5

Semifinals
1	(Romania) A Ungur	6	6
(Portugal) J Sousa	4	2

=== Bottom half ===
First round
6	(Italy) M Viola	4	2
(Slovenia) A Bedene	6	6
Q	(Poland) M Gawron	6	6
(Spain) G Olaso	4	3
WC	(Morocco) Reda Karakhi	2	1
(Germany) S Greul	6	6
(Slovakia) P Červenák	2	1
3	(Russia) E Donskoy	6	6
5	(Czech Republic) J Hájek	6	6
(Italy) G Naso	1	2
Q	(Italy) A Brizzi	7^{9}	6
(France) G Rufin	6^{7}	3
(Italy) S Vagnozzi	6	6
WC	(Morocco) Omar Erramy	1	1
(Russia) A Kuznetsov	7^{12}	3	2
2	(Austria) A Haider-Maurer	6^{10}	6	6

Second round
(Slovenia) A Bedene	2	6	6
Q	(Poland) M Gawron	6	2	1
(Germany) S Greul	6^{2}	4
3	(Russia) E Donskoy	7^{7}	6
5	(Czech Republic) J Hájek	6	6
Q	(Italy) A Brizzi	1	2
(Italy) S Vagnozzi	1	4
2	(Austria) A Haider-Maurer	6	6

Quarterfinals
(Slovenia) A Bedene	4	7^{7}	0
3	(Russia) E Donskoy	6	6^{4}	6
5	(Czech Republic) J Hájek	6	4
2	(Austria) A Haider-Maurer	2	1^{r}

Semifinals
3	(Russia) E Donskoy	6	6
5	(Czech Republic) J Hájek	4	4
