= 2013 Morocco Tennis Tour – Meknes – Doubles =

Meknes – Doubles
- 2013 Morocco Tennis Tour – Meknes

Final
- Champions: (Italy) Alessandro Giannessi; (Italy) Gianluca Naso
- Runners-up: (Spain) Gerard Granollers; (Spain) Jordi Samper Montaña
- Score: 7–5, 7–6^{(7–3)}

Events
Singles	Doubles
← 2012 ·	Morocco Tennis Tour – Meknes	· 2014 →

Adrián Menéndez and Jaroslav Pospíšil were the defending champions but decided not to participate.
Alessandro Giannessi and Gianluca Naso won the title, defeating Gerard Granollers and Jordi Samper Montaña in the final, 7–5, 7–6^{(7–3)}.

== Seeds ==
1. (Italy) Daniele Giorgini / (Italy) Matteo Volante (quarterfinals)
2. (Austria) Lukas Jastraunig / (Austria) Gerald Melzer (quarterfinals)
3. (Spain) Gerard Granollers / (Spain) Jordi Samper Montaña (finals)
4. (Italy) Alessandro Giannessi / (Italy) Gianluca Naso (champions)

== Draw ==
=== Key ===
- Q = Qualifier
- WC = Wild card
- LL = Lucky loser
- Alt = Alternate
- SE = Special exempt
- PR = Protected ranking
- ITF = ITF entry
- JE = Junior exempt
- w/o = Walkover
- r = Retired
- d = Defaulted
- SR = Special ranking

=== Draw ===
First round

Quarterfinals

Semifinals

Final

1
(Italy) D Giorgini
(Italy) Matteo Volante
7^{7}
4
[4]

- (Italy) T Fabbiano
- (Germany) C-M Stebe
6^{5}
4

(Romania) C-I Gârd
(Austria) Marc Rath
6^{5}
6
[10]

(Romania) C-I Gârd
(Austria) Marc Rath
7^{7}
6

(Romania) C-I Gârd
(Austria) Marc Rath
4
3

3
- (Spain) G Granollers
- (Spain) J Samper Montaña
6
6

3
- (Spain) G Granollers
- (Spain) J Samper Montaña
6
6

WC
- (Morocco) Y Idmbarek
- (Morocco) H Khaddari
2
3

3
- (Spain) G Granollers
- (Spain) J Samper Montaña
6
4
[10]

WC
(Morocco) Mostapha Belkora
(Morocco) Mehdi Laalej
3
2

- (Canada) S Diez
- (Spain) J Lizariturry
4
6
[7]

- (Canada) S Diez
- (Spain) J Lizariturry
6
6

3
- (Spain) G Granollers
- (Spain) J Samper Montaña
5
6^{3}

WC
- (Morocco) Y Rachidi
- (Morocco) M Ziadi
6
6

4
- (Italy) A Giannessi
- (Italy) G Naso
7
7^{7}

- (Belgium) G Gigounon
- (Belgium) Y Reuter
3
4

WC
- (Morocco) Y Rachidi
- (Morocco) M Ziadi
1
3

- (France) Michael Bois
- (Italy) R Marcora
6^{12}
6
[6]

4
- (Italy) A Giannessi
- (Italy) G Naso
6
6

4
- (Italy) A Giannessi
- (Italy) G Naso
7^{14}
3
[10]

4
- (Italy) A Giannessi
- (Italy) G Naso
5
6
[10]

(Germany) Steven Moneke
(Slovakia) Adrian Sikora

- (France) G Burquier
- (France) D Guez
7
3
[8]

- (France) G Burquier
- (France) D Guez
w/o

- (France) G Burquier
- (France) D Guez
6
6

2
- (Austria) Lukas Jastraunig
- (Austria) G Melzer
3
4
