= 2012 Morocco Tennis Tour – Meknes – Doubles =

Meknes – Doubles
- 2012 Morocco Tennis Tour – Meknes

Final
- Champions: (Spain) Adrián Menéndez (Czech Republic) Jaroslav Pospíšil
- Runners-up: (Spain) Gerard Granollers (Spain) Iván Navarro
- Score: 6–3, 3–6, [10–8]

Events
Singles	Doubles
← 2011 ·	Morocco Tennis Tour – Meknes	· 2013 →

Treat Conrad Huey and Simone Vagnozzi were the defending champions but Huey decided not to participate.
Vagnozzi played alongside Daniel Muñoz de la Nava.
Adrián Menéndez and Jaroslav Pospíšil won the title after defeating Gerard Granollers and Iván Navarro 6–3, 3–6, [10–8] in the final.

== Seeds ==
1. (Italy) Alessio di Mauro / (Italy) Alessandro Motti (first round)
2. (Spain) Adrián Menéndez / (Czech Republic) Jaroslav Pospíšil (champions)
3. (Spain) Daniel Muñoz de la Nava / (Italy) Simone Vagnozzi (semifinals)
4. (Belarus) Aliaksandr Bury / (Poland) Mateusz Kowalczyk (first round)

== Draw ==
=== Key ===
- Q = Qualifier
- WC = Wild card
- LL = Lucky loser
- Alt = Alternate
- SE = Special exempt
- PR = Protected ranking
- ITF = ITF entry
- JE = Junior exempt
- w/o = Walkover
- r = Retired
- d = Defaulted
- SR = Special ranking

=== Draw ===
First round
1	(Italy) A di Mauro (Italy) A Motti	3	4
(Spain) P Carreño Busta (Slovakia) P Červenák	6	6
(Austria) A Haider-Maurer (Czech Republic) D Lojda	6	6
WC	(Morocco) M Jdi (Algeria) L Ouahab	1	2
4	(Belarus) A Bury (Poland) M Kowalczyk	6^{5}	6	[7]
(Spain) G Granollers (Spain) I Navarro	7^{7}	1	[10]
(Germany) S Greul (Romania) A Ungur	6	3	[12]
(Italy) G Naso (Italy) M Viola	4	6	[10]
(Slovenia) A Bedene (Portugal) J Sousa	1	6	[7]
(Croatia) D Marcan (Croatia) F Škugor	6	4	[10]
(Czech Republic) J Hájek (Czech Republic) I Minář	4	6^{4}
3	(Spain) D Muñoz de la Nava (Italy) S Vagnozzi	6	7^{7}
(Russia) E Donskoy (Russia) A Kuznetsov	6	6
WC	(Morocco) Reda Karakhi (Morocco) Y Rachidi	3	4
WC	(Morocco) Omar Erramy (Morocco) Y Idmbarek	2	3
2	(Spain) A Menéndez (Czech Republic) J Pospíšil	6	6

Quarterfinals
(Spain) P Carreño Busta (Slovakia) P Červenák	6	3	[10]
(Austria) A Haider-Maurer (Czech Republic) D Lojda	4	6	[7]
(Spain) G Granollers (Spain) I Navarro	7^{7}	7^{7}
(Germany) S Greul (Romania) A Ungur	6^{1}	6^{3}
(Croatia) D Marcan (Croatia) F Škugor	7^{7}	6^{5}	[4]
3	(Spain) D Muñoz de la Nava (Italy) S Vagnozzi	6^{5}	7^{7}	[10]
(Russia) E Donskoy (Russia) A Kuznetsov	2	2
2	(Spain) A Menéndez (Czech Republic) J Pospíšil	6	6

Semifinals
(Spain) P Carreño Busta (Slovakia) P Červenák	6	3	[5]
(Spain) G Granollers (Spain) I Navarro	4	6	[10]
3	(Spain) D Muñoz de la Nava (Italy) S Vagnozzi	6^{5}	3
2	(Spain) A Menéndez (Czech Republic) J Pospíšil	7^{7}	6

Final
(Spain) G Granollers (Spain) I Navarro	3	6	[8]
2	(Spain) A Menéndez (Czech Republic) J Pospíšil	6	3	[10]
