= 2014 Morocco Tennis Tour – Meknes – Singles =

Meknes – Singles
- 2014 Morocco Tennis Tour – Meknes

Final
- Champions: (Belgium) Kimmer Coppejans
- Runners-up: (France) Lucas Pouille
- Score: 4–6, 6–2, 6–2

Events
Singles	Doubles
- Morocco Tennis Tour – Meknes

Cedrik-Marcel Stebe was the defending champion, but did not compete that year.

Kimmer Coppejans won the title, defeating Lucas Pouille in the final, 4–6, 6–2, 6–2. It was his first Challenger title in his career.

== Seeds ==
1. (Spain) Pablo Carreño (quarterfinals)
2. (Spain) Albert Ramos (second round)
3. (Bosnia and Herzegovina) Damir Džumhur (second round)
4. (Spain) Adrián Menéndez Maceiras (second round)
5. (Spain) Roberto Carballés Baena (semifinals)
6. (Chile) Hans Podlipnik Castillo (first round)
7. (Spain) Rubén Ramírez Hidalgo (second round)
8. (France) Lucas Pouille (final)

== Draw ==
Key

- Q = Qualifier
- WC = Wild card
- LL = Lucky loser
- Alt = Alternate
- ITF = ITF entry
- PR = Protected ranking
- SR = Special ranking
- SE = Special exempt
- JE = Junior exempt
- JR = Junior Accelerator Programme entrant
- CO = College Accelerator Programme entrant
- NG = Next Gen Accelerator Program entrant
- w/o = Walkover
- r = Retired
- d = Defaulted

=== Finals ===
Semifinals
8	(France) Lucas Pouille	6	2	6
5	(Spain) Roberto Carballés Baena	3	6	1
(Belgium) Kimmer Coppejans	0	6	6
(Italy) Matteo Viola	6	2	4

Final
8	(France) Lucas Pouille	6	2	2
(Belgium) Kimmer Coppejans	4	6	6

=== Top half ===
First round
1	(Spain) P Carreño	6	6
(France) M Vaïsse	3	2
WC	(Morocco) Y Idmbarek	6	1	3
(Italy) S Travaglia	3	6	6
WC	(Morocco) H Khaddari	2	2
(Belgium) Y Mertens	6	6
(Spain) G Granollers	2	3
8	(France) L Pouille	6	6
4	(Spain) A Menéndez Maceiras	6	6^{5}	6
Q	(Netherlands) M Middelkoop	2	7^{7}	3
Q	(France) Julien Obry	7	6
(Czech Republic) A Pavlásek	5	3
(Italy) F Cipolla	6	6^{4}	3
(Russia) A Karatsev	3	7^{7}	6
(Spain) J Samper Montaña	1	5
5	(Spain) R Carballés Baena	6	7

Second round
1	(Spain) P Carreño	6	1	6
(Italy) S Travaglia	2	6	4
(Belgium) Y Mertens	4	6	3
8	(France) L Pouille	6	3	6
4	(Spain) A Menéndez Maceiras	5	7^{7}	3
Q	(France) J Obry	7	6^{3}	6
(Russia) A Karatsev	7^{7}	1	1
5	(Spain) R Carballés Baena	6^{4}	6	6

Quarterfinals
1	(Spain) P Carreño	3	0
8	(France) L Pouille	6	6
Q	(France) J Obry	1	1
5	(Spain) R Carballés Baena	6	6

Semifinals
8	(France) L Pouille	6	3	6
5	(Spain) R Carballés Baena	2	6	1

=== Bottom half ===
First round
7	(Spain) R Ramírez Hidalgo	7^{7}	6
Q	(Argentina) P Cachin	6^{5}	3
(Belgium) K Coppejans	6	6
WC	(Morocco) L Ouahab	2	0
(Egypt) M Safwat	6	4
(Canada) S Diez	3	1^{r}
WC	(Morocco) Taha Tifnouti	1	3
3	(Bosnia and Herzegovina) D Džumhur	6	6
6	(Chile) H Podlipnik-Castillo	6^{2}	6	3
Q	(Egypt) S Sabry	7^{7}	4	6
(Belgium) Y Reuter	3	6	6
(France) M Bourgue	6	3	2
(Serbia) P Krstin	2	1^{r}
(Italy) M Viola	6	5
(Italy) L Giustino	6^{4}	4
2	(Spain) A Ramos	7^{7}	6

Second round
7	(Spain) R Ramírez Hidalgo	4	6^{3}
(Belgium) K Coppejans	6	7^{7}
(Egypt) M Safwat	6	5
3	(Bosnia and Herzegovina) D Džumhur	4	2^{r}
Q	(Egypt) S Sabry	6^{3}	3
(Belgium) Y Reuter	7^{7}	7
(Italy) M Viola	6	6
2	(Spain) A Ramos	4	3

Quarterfinals
(Belgium) K Coppejans	6	6^{5}	7
(Egypt) M Safwat	2	7^{7}	5
(Belgium) Y Reuter	1	2
(Italy) M Viola	6	6

Semifinals
(Belgium) K Coppejans	0	6	6
(Italy) M Viola	6	2	4
