= 2014 Morocco Tennis Tour – Meknes – Doubles =

Meknes – Doubles
- 2014 Morocco Tennis Tour – Meknes

Final
- Champions: (Chile) Hans Podlipnik Castillo (Italy) Stefano Travaglia
- Runners-up: (Spain) Gerard Granollers (Spain) Jordi Samper Montaña
- Score: 6–2, 6–7^{(4–7)}, [10–7]

Events
Singles	Doubles
- Morocco Tennis Tour – Meknes

Alessandro Giannessi and Gianluca Naso were the defending champions. Giannessi did not compete, while Naso partnered Alessio di Mauro, and lost in the first round to Gerard Granollers and Jordi Samper Montaña.

Hans Podlipnik Castillo and Stefano Travaglia won the title, defeating Granollers and Samper Montaña in the final, 6–2, 6–7^{(4–7)}, [10–7].

== Seeds ==
1. (Italy) Claudio Grassi / (United Kingdom) Sean Thornley (quarterfinals)
2. (Spain) Adrián Menéndez Maceiras / (Spain) Rubén Ramírez Hidalgo (quarterfinals)
3. (Italy) Flavio Cipolla / (Italy) Matteo Viola (quarterfinals)
4. (Spain) Gerard Granollers / (Spain) Jordi Samper Montaña (final)

== Draw ==
Key

- Q = Qualifier
- WC = Wild card
- LL = Lucky loser
- Alt = Alternate
- ITF = ITF entry
- PR = Protected ranking
- SR = Special ranking
- SE = Special exempt
- JE = Junior exempt
- JR = Junior Accelerator Programme entrant
- CO = College Accelerator Programme entrant
- NG = Next Gen Accelerator Program entrant
- w/o = Walkover
- r = Retired
- d = Defaulted

=== Draw ===
First round
1	(Italy) C Grassi (United Kingdom) S Thornley	6	6
WC	(Morocco) Naoufal El Idrissi (Morocco) Taha Tifnouti	2	2
(Egypt) S Sabry (Egypt) M Safwat	7^{10}	7
(Netherlands) M Middelkoop (United Kingdom) D Walsh	6^{8}	5
4	(Spain) G Granollers (Spain) J Samper Montaña	6	4	[10]
(Italy) A di Mauro (Italy) G Naso	2	6	[4]
(France) Julien Obry (France) M Vaïsse	2	2
(Croatia) D Marcan (Croatia) A Šančić	6	6
(Egypt) K Hossam (Russia) A Zaitcev	7	6
WC	(Morocco) Mohamed Adnaoui (Morocco) Ayoub Chakrouni	5	1
(Bosnia and Herzegovina) D Džumhur (Czech Republic) A Pavlásek	3	7^{9}	[3]
3	(Italy) F Cipolla (Italy) M Viola	6	6^{7}	[10]
(Belgium) Y Mertens (Belgium) Y Reuter	4	4
(Chile) H Podlipnik Castillo (Italy) S Travaglia	6	6
WC	(Morocco) Y Idmbarek (Morocco) Y Rachidi	5	1
2	(Spain) A Menéndez Maceiras (Spain) R Ramírez Hidalgo	7	6

Quarterfinals
1	(Italy) C Grassi (United Kingdom) S Thornley	4	6^{5}
(Egypt) S Sabry (Egypt) M Safwat	6	7^{7}
4	(Spain) G Granollers (Spain) J Samper Montaña	3	6	[10]
(Croatia) D Marcan (Croatia) A Šančić	6	3	[6]
(Egypt) K Hossam (Russia) A Zaitcev	1	6	[13]
3	(Italy) F Cipolla (Italy) M Viola	6	3	[11]
(Chile) H Podlipnik Castillo (Italy) S Travaglia	6^{3}	7^{7}	[11]
2	(Spain) A Menéndez Maceiras (Spain) R Ramírez Hidalgo	7^{7}	6^{2}	[9]

Semifinals
(Egypt) S Sabry (Egypt) M Safwat	2	2
4	(Spain) G Granollers (Spain) J Samper Montaña	6	6
(Egypt) K Hossam (Russia) A Zaitcev	6	3	[3]
(Chile) H Podlipnik Castillo (Italy) S Travaglia	4	6	[10]

Final
4	(Spain) G Granollers (Spain) J Samper Montaña	2	7^{7}	[7]
(Chile) H Podlipnik Castillo (Italy) S Travaglia	6	6^{4}	[10]
