= 2015 Morocco Tennis Tour – Meknes – Singles =

Meknes – Singles
- 2015 Morocco Tennis Tour – Meknes

Final
- Champion: (Spain) Daniel Muñoz de la Nava
- Runner-up: (Spain) Roberto Carballés Baena
- Score: 6–4, 6–2

Events
Singles	Doubles
- Morocco Tennis Tour – Meknes

Kimmer Coppejans was the defending champion, but chose not to defend his title.

== Seeds ==
1. (Spain) Daniel Muñoz de la Nava (champion)
2. (Argentina) Facundo Argüello (semifinals)
3. (Spain) Roberto Carballés Baena (final)
4. (Austria) Gerald Melzer (semifinals)
5. (Portugal) Gastão Elias (quarterfinals)
6. (Italy) Gianluca Naso (first round)
7. (Italy) Matteo Viola (Querterfinals)
8. (France) Mathias Bourgue (second round)

== Draw ==
Key

- Q = Qualifier
- WC = Wild card
- LL = Lucky loser
- Alt = Alternate
- ITF = ITF entry
- PR = Protected ranking
- SR = Special ranking
- SE = Special exempt
- JE = Junior exempt
- JR = Junior Accelerator Programme entrant
- CO = College Accelerator Programme entrant
- NG = Next Gen Accelerator Program entrant
- w/o = Walkover
- r = Retired
- d = Defaulted

=== Finals ===
Semifinals
1	(Spain) Daniel Muñoz de la Nava	4	6	6
4	(Austria) Gerald Melzer	6	3	4
3	(Spain) Roberto Carballés Baena	6	2	7^{7}
2	(Argentina) Facundo Argüello	3	6	6^{3}

Final
1	(Spain) Daniel Muñoz de la Nava	6	6
3	(Spain) Roberto Carballés Baena	4	2

=== Top half ===
First round
1	(Spain) D Muñoz de la Nava	4	7	7
(France) S Robert	6	5	5
(Germany) M Marterer	6	6
Q	(Germany) K Krawietz	3	2
WC	(Morocco) Khalid Allouch	0	4
Q	(Belgium) Y Reuter	6	6
(Serbia) N Milojević	6	6
6	(Italy) G Naso	4	4
4	(Austria) G Melzer	6	6
WC	(Morocco) A Ahouda	1	4
(France) G Sakharov	3	6	5
Q	(Italy) Claudio Fortuna	6	4	7
Q	(Argentina) T Lipovšek Puches	6	6
(Spain) E López Pérez	2	4
(Slovakia) F Horanský	6^{5}	4
8	(France) M Bourgue	7^{7}	6

Second round
1	(Spain) D Muñoz de la Nava	6	6
(Germany) M Marterer	4	3
Q	(Belgium) Y Reuter	6	6
(Serbia) N Milojević	4	1
4	(Austria) G Melzer	5	6	6
Q	(Italy) C Fortuna	7	3	2
Q	(Argentina) T Lipovšek Puches	6	3	6
8	(France) M Bourgue	2	6	3

Quarterfinals
1	(Spain) D Muñoz de la Nava	7	6
Q	(Belgium) Y Reuter	5	4
4	(Austria) G Melzer	6	7
Q	(Argentina) T Lipovšek Puches	4	5

Semifinals
1	(Spain) D Muñoz de la Nava	4	6	6
4	(Austria) G Melzer	6	3	4

=== Bottom half ===
First round
5	(Portugal) G Elias	6	6
(Bulgaria) D Kuzmanov	2	2
(Portugal) R Machado	7	6
(Austria) M Linzer	5	3
WC	(Morocco) Ayoub Chakrouni	1	3
(Serbia) Ivan Bjelica	6	6
WC	(Morocco) Y Idmbarek	0^{r}
3	(Spain) R Carballés Baena	2
7	(Italy) M Viola	6	6
(Lithuania) L Grigelis	3	3
(Russia) Kirill Dmitriev	6	4	3
(Switzerland) A Bossel	3	6	6
(Croatia) N Mektić	6	4	3
(Kazakhstan) D Popko	4	6	6
(France) A Musialek	3	4
2	(Argentina) F Argüello	6	6

Second round
5	(Portugal) G Elias	6	4	7
(Portugal) R Machado	3	6	5
(Serbia) I Bjelica	2	0
3	(Spain) R Carballés Baena	6	6
7	(Italy) M Viola	7^{7}	6
(Switzerland) A Bossel	6^{0}	3
(Kazakhstan) D Popko	1	2
2	(Argentina) F Argüello	6	6

Quarterfinals
5	(Portugal) G Elias	4	3
3	(Spain) R Carballés Baena	6	6
7	(Italy) M Viola	4	6^{4}
2	(Argentina) F Argüello	6	7^{7}

Semifinals
3	(Spain) R Carballés Baena	6	2	7^{7}
2	(Argentina) F Argüello	3	6	6^{3}
