= 2016 Morocco Tennis Tour – Meknes – Singles =

Meknes – Singles
- 2016 Morocco Tennis Tour – Meknes

Final
- Champion: (Germany) Maximilian Marterer
- Runner-up: (Belarus) Uladzimir Ignatik
- Score: 7–6^{(7–3)}, 6–3

Events
Singles	Doubles
← 2015 ·	Morocco Tennis Tour – Meknes	· 2017 →

Daniel Muñoz de la Nava was the defending champion but chose not to defend his title.

Maximilian Marterer won the title after defeating Uladzimir Ignatik 7–6^{(7–3)}, 6–3 in the final.

== Seeds ==
1. (Spain) Roberto Carballés Baena (first round)
2. (Belgium) Arthur De Greef (quarterfinals)
3. (Canada) Steven Diez (second round)
4. (Egypt) Mohamed Safwat (quarterfinals)
5. (Belarus) Uladzimir Ignatik (final)
6. (Belgium) Yannik Reuter (second round)
7. (Spain) David Pérez Sanz (first round)
8. (Germany) Maximilian Marterer (champion)

== Draw ==
=== Key ===
- Q = Qualifier
- WC = Wild card
- LL = Lucky loser
- Alt = Alternate
- SE = Special exempt
- PR = Protected ranking
- ITF = ITF entry
- JE = Junior exempt
- w/o = Walkover
- r = Retired
- d = Defaulted
- SR = Special ranking

=== Finals ===
Semifinals
8	(Germany) Maximilian Marterer	6	6
(Spain) Pedro Martínez	2	1
(Spain) Oriol Roca Batalla	6	3	3
5	(Belarus) Uladzimir Ignatik	3	6	6

Final
8	(Germany) Maximilian Marterer	7^{7}	6
5	(Belarus) Uladzimir Ignatik	6^{3}	3

=== Top half ===
First round
1	(Spain) R Carballés Baena	6	6^{2}	6^{4}
Q	(Netherlands) Linnert van der Linden	2	7^{7}	7^{7}
(Germany) Jeremy Jahn	7^{8}	6
Q	(Spain) M Vilella Martínez	6^{6}	4
Q	(Austria) Gibril Diarra	6^{3}	6	4
(Russia) I Nedelko	7^{7}	3	6
(Argentina) P Cachin	2	0
8	(Germany) M Marterer	6	6
4	(Egypt) M Safwat	6	6
LL	(Spain) P Toledo Bagué	3	0
LL	(Belgium) Omar Salman	6	6
WC	(Morocco) Ayoub Chakrouni	1	1
WC	(Morocco) Y Idmbarek	2	1
(Spain) P Martínez	6	6
PR	(Italy) A Brizzi	3	6	6
7	(Spain) D Pérez Sanz	6	3	2

Second round
Q	(Netherlands) L van der Linden	6^{2}	6^{5}
(Germany) J Jahn	7^{7}	7^{7}
(Russia) I Nedelko	2	4
8	(Germany) M Marterer	6	6
4	(Egypt) M Safwat	6	6
LL	(Belgium) O Salman	3	3
(Spain) P Martínez	4	6	6
PR	(Italy) A Brizzi	6	3	1

Quarterfinals
(Germany) J Jahn	4	4
8	(Germany) M Marterer	6	6
4	(Egypt) M Safwat	4	6	4
(Spain) P Martínez	6	4	6

Semifinals
8	(Germany) M Marterer	6	6
(Spain) P Martínez	2	1

=== Bottom half ===
First round
6	(Belgium) Y Reuter	6	6
(Argentina) T Lipovšek Puches	1	3
Q	(Russia) A Zhurbin	4	3
(Germany) N Langer	6	6
WC	(Morocco) M Jdi	1	6	2
(Spain) O Roca Batalla	6	4	6
(Belgium) Clément Geens	2	0
3	(Canada) S Diez	6	6
5	(Belarus) U Ignatik	6	6
Alt	(Chile) Bastián Malla	3	2
(Argentina) F Coria	5	7	6
(Belgium) G Gigounon	7	5	3
(France) M Janvier	7^{7}	6
(France) M Chazal	6^{4}	4
LL	(Belgium) S Gillé	1	3
2	(Belgium) A De Greef	6	6

Second round
6	(Belgium) Y Reuter	4	4
(Germany) N Langer	6	6
(Spain) O Roca Batalla	6	7^{7}
3	(Canada) S Diez	4	6^{4}
5	(Belarus) U Ignatik	6	6
(Argentina) F Coria	2	3
(France) M Janvier	6	6^{5}	2
2	(Belgium) A De Greef	3	7^{7}	6

Quarterfinals
(Germany) N Langer
(Spain) O Roca Batalla	w/o
5	(Belarus) U Ignatik	6	3	6
2	(Belgium) A De Greef	2	6	2

Semifinals
(Spain) O Roca Batalla	6	3	3
5	(Belarus) U Ignatik	3	6	6
