= 2010 Morocco Tennis Tour – Meknes – Doubles =

Meknes – Doubles
- 2010 Morocco Tennis Tour – Meknes

Final
- Champions: (Spain) Pablo Andújar; (Italy) Flavio Cipolla
- Runners-up: (Ukraine) Oleksandr Dolgopolov Jr.; (Ukraine) Artem Smirnov
- Score: 6–2, 6–2

Events
| Singles | Doubles |
| ← 2009 · | Morocco Tennis Tour – Meknes | · 2011 → |

Marc López and Lamine Ouahab were the defending champions; however, López chose to not participate this year.
Ouahab partnered up with Adrián Menéndez; however, they lost against Harsh Mankad and Adil Shamasdin in the first round.
Pablo Andújar and Flavio Cipolla won in the final 6–2, 6–2, against Oleksandr Dolgopolov Jr. and Artem Smirnov.

== Seeds ==
1. (India) Harsh Mankad / (Canada) Adil Shamasdin (quarterfinals)
2. (Italy) Alessio di Mauro / (Italy) Simone Vagnozzi (first round)
3. (Spain) David Marrero / (Spain) Daniel Muñoz de la Nava (quarterfinals)
4. (Spain) Carles Poch Gradin / (Spain) Pere Riba (semifinals)

== Draw ==
=== Key ===
- Q = Qualifier
- WC = Wild card
- LL = Lucky loser
- Alt = Alternate
- SE = Special exempt
- PR = Protected ranking
- ITF = ITF entry
- JE = Junior exempt
- w/o = Walkover
- r = Retired
- d = Defaulted
- SR = Special ranking

=== Draw ===
First round

Quarterfinals

Semifinals

Finals

1
- (India) H Mankad
- (Canada) A Shamasdin
7
5
[12]

- (Spain) A Menéndez
- (Algeria) L Ouahab
6^{4}
7
[10]

1
- (India) H Mankad
- (Canada) A Shamasdin
6
3
[5]

WC
- (Morocco) A Fattar
- (Morocco) Y Idmbarek
2
3

- (Spain) P Andújar
- (Italy) F Cipolla
2
6
[10]

- (Spain) P Andújar
- (Italy) F Cipolla
6
6

- (Spain) P Andújar
- (Italy) F Cipolla
7
4
[10]

4
- (Spain) C Poch-Gradin
- (Spain) P Riba
6
6

4
- (Spain) C Poch-Gradin
- (Spain) P Riba
6^{2}
6
[6]

- (Slovenia) B Kavčič
- (Czech Republic) D Lojda
3
1

4
- (Spain) C Poch-Gradin
- (Spain) P Riba
6
6

- (Ukraine) I Anikanov
- (Russia) D Sitak
2
4

- (Portugal) R Machado
- (Portugal) L Tavares
2
3

- (Portugal) R Machado
- (Portugal) L Tavares
6
6

- (Spain) P Andújar
- (Italy) F Cipolla
6
6

- (Spain) I Navarro
- (Spain) A Ramos Viñolas
6
4
[4]

- (Ukraine) O Dolgopolov Jr.
- (Ukraine) A Smirnov
2
2

- (Ukraine) O Dolgopolov Jr.
- (Ukraine) A Smirnov
2
6
[10]

- (Ukraine) O Dolgopolov Jr.
- (Ukraine) A Smirnov
6
7

WC
- (Morocco) M Saber
- (Morocco) M Ziadi
2
2

3
- (Spain) D Marrero
1
5

3
- (Spain) D Marrero
6
6

- (Ukraine) O Dolgopolov Jr.
- (Ukraine) A Smirnov
7
6

- (Germany) D Meffert
- (Romania) A Ungur
7
7

- (Germany) D Meffert
- (Romania) A Ungur
6^{2}
3

WC
- (Morocco) R Chaki
- (Morocco) R El Amrani
6^{5}
5

- (Germany) D Meffert
- (Romania) A Ungur
6
6^{3}
[10]

- (Belarus) U Ignatik
- (Slovakia) M Kližan
4
6
[10]

- (Belarus) U Ignatik
- (Slovakia) M Kližan
4
7
[4]

2
- (Italy) A di Mauro
- (Italy) S Vagnozzi
6
4
7
