= 2014 Grand Prix Hassan II – Singles =

Singles
- 2014 Grand Prix Hassan II

Final
- Champion: (Spain) Guillermo García López
- Runner-up: (Spain) Marcel Granollers
- Score: 5–7, 6–4, 6–3

Details
- Draw: 28
- Seeds: 8

Events
Singles	Doubles
← 2013 ·	Grand Prix Hassan II	· 2015 →

Tommy Robredo was the defending champion, but he decided to compete in Houston instead.

Guillermo García López won the title, defeating Marcel Granollers in the final, 5–7, 6–4, 6–3.

== Seeds ==
The top four seeds received a bye into the second round.

1. (South Africa) Kevin Anderson (second round)
2. (France) Gaël Monfils (withdrew)
3. (France) Benoît Paire (quarterfinals)
4. (Spain) Marcel Granollers (final)
5. (Portugal) João Sousa (second round)
6. (Argentina) Federico Delbonis (semifinals)
7. (Netherlands) Robin Haase (first round)
8. (Spain) Guillermo García López (champion)

== Draw ==
=== Key ===
- Q = Qualifier
- WC = Wild card
- LL = Lucky loser
- Alt = Alternate
- SE = Special exempt
- PR = Protected ranking
- ITF = ITF entry
- JE = Junior exempt
- w/o = Walkover
- r = Retired
- d = Defaulted
- SR = Special ranking

=== Finals ===
Semifinals
6	(Argentina) Federico Delbonis	1	4
4	(Spain) Marcel Granollers	6	6
8	(Spain) Guillermo García López	6	6^{6}	6
Q	(Spain) Roberto Carballés Baena	2	7^{8}	4

Final
4	(Spain) Marcel Granollers	7	4	3
8	(Spain) Guillermo García López	5	6	6

=== Top half ===
First round
(Romania) V Hănescu	7^{7}	6
WC	(Morocco) H Khaddari	6^{3}	3
(Italy) F Volandri	6^{6}	3
Q	(Canada) F Peliwo	7^{8}	6
Q	(France) G Simon	4	4
6	(Argentina) F Delbonis	6	6
(Spain) A Ramos	6	2	6
WC	(Morocco) L Ouahab	3	6	1
(Germany) T Kamke	1	2
(Spain) P Carreño Busta	6	6
(Kazakhstan) O Nedovyesov	7^{8}	6
7	(Netherlands) R Haase	6^{6}	4

Second round
1	(South Africa) K Anderson	4	4
(Romania) V Hănescu	6	6
Q	(Canada) F Peliwo	2	7^{7}	4
6	(Argentina) F Delbonis	6	6^{5}	6
4	(Spain) M Granollers	6	7^{7}
(Spain) A Ramos	3	6^{3}
(Spain) P Carreño Busta	3	6	7^{7}
(Kazakhstan) O Nedovyesov	6	1	6^{3}

Quarterfinals
(Romania) V Hănescu	6^{5}	3
6	(Argentina) F Delbonis	7^{7}	6
4	(Spain) M Granollers	6^{4}	6	6
(Spain) P Carreño Busta	7^{7}	3	0

Semifinals
6	(Argentina) F Delbonis	1	4
4	(Spain) M Granollers	6	6

=== Bottom half ===
First round
8	(Spain) G García López	7^{7}	7^{8}
(Kazakhstan) M Kukushkin	6^{5}	6^{6}
(Russia) T Gabashvili	4	1
(Argentina) C Berlocq	6	6
(France) K de Schepper	2	3
(Spain) A Montañés	6	6
5	(Portugal) J Sousa	6	6
(Netherlands) I Sijsling	2	4
Q	(Belgium) D Goffin	2	5
Q	(Spain) R Carballés Baena	6	7
(Czech Republic) J Veselý	6	6
(Argentina) L Mayer	4	3

Second round
8	(Spain) G García López	6	7
(Argentina) C Berlocq	2	5
(Spain) A Montañés	4	7	4
3	(France) B Paire	6	5	6
5	(Portugal) J Sousa	7^{9}	6^{5}	2
Q	(Spain) R Carballés Baena	6^{7}	7^{7}	6
(Czech Republic) J Veselý	2	1^{r}
LL	(Russia) A Kuznetsov	6	3

Quarterfinals
8	(Spain) G García López	7	7^{7}
3	(France) B Paire	5	6^{4}
Q	(Spain) R Carballés Baena	6	6
LL	(Russia) A Kuznetsov	4	2

Semifinals
8	(Spain) G García López	6	6^{6}	6
Q	(Spain) R Carballés Baena	2	7^{8}	4

== Qualifying ==
=== Seeds ===
1. (France) Gilles Simon (qualified)
2. (Serbia) Dušan Lajović (second round)
3. (France) Stéphane Robert (second round)
4. (Belgium) David Goffin (qualified)
5. (France) Paul-Henri Mathieu (first round, retired)
6. (Russia) Andrey Kuznetsov (qualifying competition, Lucky loser)
7. (Italy) Potito Starace (second round)
8. (Austria) Martin Fischer (qualifying competition)

=== Qualifiers ===
1. (France) Gilles Simon
2. (Spain) Roberto Carballés Baena
3. (Canada) Filip Peliwo
4. (Belgium) David Goffin

=== Lucky loser ===
1. (Russia) Andrey Kuznetsov

=== Qualifying draw ===
==== First qualifier ====
First round
1	(France) Gilles Simon	7	2	7
(Serbia) Nikola Ćaćić	5	6	5
(Spain) Enrique López Pérez	6	1	4
(Italy) Roberto Marcora	2	6	6
(Austria) Philipp Oswald	6	6
WC	(Morocco) Khalid Allouch	0	0
(Italy) Flavio Cipolla	2	2
6	(Russia) Andrey Kuznetsov	6	6

Second round
1	(France) Gilles Simon	5	7	6
(Italy) Roberto Marcora	7	5	0
(Austria) Philipp Oswald	4	4
6	(Russia) Andrey Kuznetsov	6	6

Qualifying competition
1	(France) Gilles Simon	6	6
6	(Russia) Andrey Kuznetsov	3	2

==== Second qualifier ====
First round
2	(Serbia) Dušan Lajović	6	6
WC	(Morocco) Yassine Idmbarek	0	1
(Austria) Oliver Marach	3	4
(Spain) Roberto Carballés Baena	6	6
(Italy) Alessandro Giannessi	4	7	6
(Italy) Lorenzo Giustino	6	5	2
(Netherlands) Boy Westerhof	6^{6}	4
8	(Austria) Martin Fischer	7^{8}	6

Second round
2	(Serbia) Dušan Lajović	3	1
(Spain) Roberto Carballés Baena	6	6
(Italy) Alessandro Giannessi	6^{5}	2
8	(Austria) Martin Fischer	7^{7}	6

Qualifying competition
(Spain) Roberto Carballés Baena	6	6
8	(Austria) Martin Fischer	4	3

==== Third qualifier ====
First round
3	(France) Stéphane Robert	6	3	6
(Australia) John Peers	3	6	3
WC	(Russia) Mikhail Elgin	2	0
(Romania) Victor Crivoi	6	6
(France) Florent Serra	3	3
(Canada) Filip Peliwo	6	6
(Spain) Juan Lizariturry	5
5	(France) Paul-Henri Mathieu	4^{r}

Second round
3	(France) Stéphane Robert	3	3
(Romania) Victor Crivoi	6	6
(Canada) Filip Peliwo	5	6	6
(Spain) Juan Lizariturry	7	3	4

Qualifying competition
(Romania) Victor Crivoi	1	4
(Canada) Filip Peliwo	6	6

==== Fourth qualifier ====
First round
4	(Belgium) David Goffin	6	6
(Italy) Gianluca Naso	2	2
(Germany) Richard Becker	6	6
WC	(Czech Republic) František Čermák	0	2
(Morocco) Younès Rachidi	2	0
(Italy) Marco Cecchinato	6	6
(Morocco) Nizar Belmati	1	1
7	(Italy) Potito Starace	6	6

Second round
4	(Belgium) David Goffin	6	6
(Germany) Richard Becker	1	2
(Italy) Marco Cecchinato	6	7
7	(Italy) Potito Starace	3	5

Qualifying competition
4	(Belgium) David Goffin	6	6
(Italy) Marco Cecchinato	4	0
