= 2010 Morocco Tennis Tour – Meknes – Singles =

Morocco Tennis championship

Meknes – Singles
- 2010 Morocco Tennis Tour – Meknes

Final
- Champion: (Ukraine) Oleksandr Dolgopolov Jr.
- Runner-up: (Portugal) Rui Machado
- Score: 7–5, 6–2

Events
Singles	Doubles
← 2009 ·	Morocco Tennis Tour – Meknes	· 2011 →

Rui Machado was the defending champion, but he lost in the final 5–7, 2–6 against Oleksandr Dolgopolov Jr.

== Seeds ==
1. (Belgium) Steve Darcis (first round)
2. (Slovenia) Blaž Kavčič (second round)
3. (Ukraine) Oleksandr Dolgopolov Jr. (champion)
4. (Spain) Pere Riba (semifinals)
5. (Portugal) Rui Machado (final)
6. (Spain) Iván Navarro (quarterfinals)
7. (Spain) David Marrero (quarterfinals)
8. (Spain) Pablo Andújar (second round)

== Draw ==
=== Key ===
- Q = Qualifier
- WC = Wild card
- LL = Lucky loser
- Alt = Alternate
- SE = Special exempt
- PR = Protected ranking
- ITF = ITF entry
- JE = Junior exempt
- w/o = Walkover
- r = Retired
- d = Defaulted
- SR = Special ranking

=== Finals ===
Semifinals
(Algeria) Lamine Ouahab	3	4
3	(Ukraine) Oleksandr Dolgopolov Jr.	6	6
4	(Spain) Pere Riba	1	5
5	(Portugal) Rui Machado	6	7

Final
3	(Ukraine) Oleksandr Dolgopolov Jr.	7	6
5	(Portugal) Rui Machado	5	2

=== Top half ===
First round
1	(Belgium) S Darcis	4	6	3
(Belarus) U Ignatik	6	1	6
(Czech Republic) D Lojda	6	4	5
Q	(Spain) P Carreño Busta	4	6	7
(Algeria) L Ouahab	6	6
(Germany) D Meffert	3	3
WC	(Morocco) H Khaddari	4	2
8	(Spain) P Andújar	6	6
3	(Ukraine) O Dolgopolov Jr.	6	4	7
(Italy) A Arnaboldi	3	6	6^{3}
(Spain) A Menéndez Maceiras	2	2
WC	(Morocco) R El Amrani	6	6
(Spain) A Ramos Viñolas	7	2	6
Q	(Spain) I Cervantes Huegun	6^{4}	6	1
(Austria) A Haider-Maurer	2	0
6	(Spain) I Navarro	6	6

Second round
(Belarus) U Ignatik	3	4
Q	(Spain) P Carreño Busta	6	6
(Algeria) L Ouahab	2	7	6
8	(Spain) P Andújar	6	6^{5}	4
3	(Ukraine) O Dolgopolov Jr.	6	6
WC	(Morocco) R El Amrani	2	4
(Spain) A Ramos Viñolas	7	2	1
6	(Spain) I Navarro	5	6	6

Quarterfinals
Q	(Spain) P Carreño Busta	4	0
(Algeria) L Ouahab	6	6
3	(Ukraine) O Dolgopolov Jr.	3	7	6
6	(Spain) I Navarro	6	5	3

Semifinals
(Algeria) L Ouahab	3	4
3	(Ukraine) O Dolgopolov Jr.	6	6

=== Bottom half ===
First round
7	(Spain) D Marrero	6	6
WC	(Morocco) M Ziadi	4	3
WC	(Morocco) A Fattar	2	2
(Romania) A Ungur	6	6
(Serbia) I Bozoljac	6	7
(Spain) D Muñoz de la Nava	4	5
Q	(Spain) C Poch Gradin	3	4
4	(Spain) P Riba	6	6
5	(Portugal) R Machado	6	6
(Italy) F Cipolla	3	4
(Slovakia) M Kližan	6	1	2
Q	(Italy) F Aldi	2	6	6
(Croatia) A Veić	4	6	6
(Italy) A Brizzi	6	4	3
(Italy) A di Mauro	2	2
2	(Slovenia) B Kavčič	6	6

Second round
7	(Spain) D Marrero	1	6	6
(Romania) A Ungur	6	3	4
(Serbia) I Bozoljac	2	3
4	(Spain) P Riba	6	6
5	(Portugal) R Machado	4	6	6
Q	(Italy) F Aldi	6	4	1
(Croatia) A Veić	6	6
2	(Slovenia) B Kavčič	1	4

Quarterfinals
7	(Spain) D Marrero	6	1	4
4	(Spain) P Riba	3	6	6
5	(Portugal) R Machado	6	6
(Croatia) A Veić	4	4

Semifinals
4	(Spain) P Riba	1	5
5	(Portugal) R Machado	6	7
