= 2011 Morocco Tennis Tour – Meknes – Doubles =

Meknes – Doubles
- 2011 Morocco Tennis Tour – Meknes

Final
- Champions: (Philippines) Treat Conrad Huey (Italy) Simone Vagnozzi
- Runners-up: (Italy) Alessio di Mauro (Italy) Alessandro Motti
- Score: 6–1, 6–2

Events
Singles	Doubles
- Morocco Tennis Tour – Meknes

Pablo Andújar and Flavio Cipolla were the defending champions but decided not to participate.
Treat Conrad Huey and Simone Vagnozzi won the final against Alessio di Mauro and Alessandro Motti 6–1, 6–2.

== Seeds ==
1. (Philippines) Treat Conrad Huey / (Italy) Simone Vagnozzi (champions)
2. (Italy) Alessio di Mauro / (Italy) Alessandro Motti (final)
3. (Spain) Gerard Granollers / (Spain) Guillermo Olaso (quarterfinals)
4. (Germany) Simon Greul / (Germany) Bastian Knittel (first round)

== Draw ==
Key

- Q = Qualifier
- WC = Wild card
- LL = Lucky loser
- Alt = Alternate
- ITF = ITF entry
- PR = Protected ranking
- SR = Special ranking
- SE = Special exempt
- JE = Junior exempt
- JR = Junior Accelerator Programme entrant
- CO = College Accelerator Programme entrant
- NG = Next Gen Accelerator Program entrant
- w/o = Walkover
- r = Retired
- d = Defaulted

=== Draw ===
First round
1	(Philippines) TC Huey (Italy) S Vagnozzi	6	6
WC	(Morocco) A Fattar (Morocco) Y Idmbarek	1	0
WC	(Morocco) H Khaddari (Morocco) Y Rachidi	4	2
(Algeria) L Ouahab (Portugal) L Tavares	6	6
4	(Germany) S Greul (Germany) B Knittel	4	1
(Italy) W Trusendi (Italy) M Viola	6	6
(Romania) V Crivoi (Croatia) F Škugor	6	6
(Hungary) A Balázs (Czech Republic) J Pospíšil	3	4
(Serbia) N Ćirić (Croatia) A Veić	6	6^{3}	[6]
(Germany) Alexander Flock (Germany) D Gremelmayr	4	7	[10]
(Spain) G Alcaide (Slovakia) I Klec	3	1
3	(Spain) G Granollers (Spain) G Olaso	6	6
(France) A Gensse (France) É Prodon	7	1	[7]
WC	(Morocco) R El Amrani (Morocco) T Ouahabi	5	6	[10]
(Latvia) D Pavlovs (Ukraine) I Sergeyev	0	3
2	(Italy) A di Mauro (Italy) A Motti	6	6

Quarterfinals
1	(Philippines) TC Huey (Italy) S Vagnozzi	3	6	[10]
(Algeria) L Ouahab (Portugal) L Tavares	6	2	[8]
(Italy) W Trusendi (Italy) M Viola	7	6
(Romania) V Crivoi (Croatia) F Škugor	6^{4}	4
(Germany) Alexander Flock (Germany) D Gremelmayr	7	6
3	(Spain) G Granollers (Spain) G Olaso	6^{3}	4
WC	(Morocco) R El Amrani (Morocco) T Ouahabi	2	3^{r}
2	(Italy) A di Mauro (Italy) A Motti	6	4

Semifinals
1	(Philippines) TC Huey (Italy) S Vagnozzi	6	6
(Italy) W Trusendi (Italy) M Viola	3	3
(Germany) Alexander Flock (Germany) D Gremelmayr	1	2
2	(Italy) A di Mauro (Italy) A Motti	6	6

Final
1	(Philippines) TC Huey (Italy) S Vagnozzi	6	6
2	(Italy) A di Mauro (Italy) A Motti	1	2
