= 2011 Morocco Tennis Tour – Meknes – Singles =

Meknes – Singles
- 2011 Morocco Tennis Tour – Meknes

Final
- Champion: (Czech Republic) Jaroslav Pospíšil
- Runner-up: (Spain) Guillermo Olaso
- Score: 6–1, 3–6, 6–3

Events
Singles	Doubles
- Morocco Tennis Tour – Meknes

Alexandr Dolgopolov was the defending champion, but decided to compete at the 2011 Copa Claro instead.
Jaroslav Pospíšil defeated Guillermo Olaso in the final 6–1, 3–6, 6–3.

== Seeds ==
1. (Germany) Denis Gremelmayr (first round)
2. (Germany) Simon Greul (semifinals, withdrew)
3. (France) Éric Prodon (first round)
4. (Czech Republic) Jaroslav Pospíšil (champion)
5. (Italy) Alessio di Mauro (Quarterfinal)
6. (Germany) Bastian Knittel (semifinals)
7. (France) Augustin Gensse (first round)
8. (Italy) Simone Vagnozzi (second round)

== Draw ==
Key

- Q = Qualifier
- WC = Wild card
- LL = Lucky loser
- Alt = Alternate
- ITF = ITF entry
- PR = Protected ranking
- SR = Special ranking
- SE = Special exempt
- JE = Junior exempt
- JR = Junior Accelerator Programme entrant
- CO = College Accelerator Programme entrant
- NG = Next Gen Accelerator Program entrant
- w/o = Walkover
- r = Retired
- d = Defaulted

=== Finals ===
Semifinals
(Spain) Guillermo Olaso	4	6	7
6	(Germany) Bastian Knittel	6	3	6^{6}
4	(Czech Republic) Jaroslav Pospíšil	w/o
2	(Germany) Simon Greul

Final
(Spain) Guillermo Olaso	1	6	3
4	(Czech Republic) Jaroslav Pospíšil	6	3	6

=== Top half ===
First round
1	(Germany) D Gremelmayr	6^{4}	2
(Spain) G Olaso	7	6
(Portugal) L Tavares	6	4	4
(Russia) A Kuznetsov	4	6	6
(Russia) Alexander Lobkov	4	2
Q	(Romania) V Crivoi	6	6
(Ukraine) I Sergeyev	1	6^{2}
8	(Italy) S Vagnozzi	6	7
3	(France) É Prodon	2	1
Q	(Croatia) F Škugor	6	6
Q	(Spain) G Granollers-Pujol	2	5
(Spain) G Alcaide	6	7
(Russia) E Donskoy	5	3
(Morocco) R El Amrani	7	6
(Hungary) A Balázs	6	1	1
6	(Germany) B Knittel	4	6	6

Second round
(Spain) G Olaso	4	7	7
(Russia) A Kuznetsov	6	6^{4}	6^{7}
Q	(Romania) V Crivoi	6	6
8	(Italy) S Vagnozzi	4	1
Q	(Croatia) F Škugor	3	6	6^{3}
(Spain) G Alcaide	6	2	7
(Morocco) R El Amrani	5	6	3
6	(Germany) B Knittel	7	4	6

Quarterfinals
(Spain) G Olaso	4	7	7
Q	(Romania) V Crivoi	6	5	6^{4}
(Spain) G Alcaide	6	2	3
6	(Germany) B Knittel	3	6	6

Semifinals
(Spain) G Olaso	4	6	7
6	(Germany) B Knittel	6	3	6^{6}

=== Bottom half ===
First round
5	(Italy) A di Mauro	6	6
WC	(Morocco) A Fattar	1	3
(United States) K Kim	6	6
WC	(Morocco) T Ouahabi	4	3
Q	(Brazil) L Kirche	6	6
WC	(Morocco) H Khaddari	4	1
(Algeria) L Ouahab	1	1
4	(Czech Republic) J Pospíšil	6	6
7	(France) A Gensse	5	6^{6}
(Serbia) N Ćirić	7	7
WC	(Morocco) Y Idmbarek	6	4	4
(Slovakia) I Klec	0	6	6
(Germany) Alexander Flock	6	4	4
(Croatia) A Veić	1	6	6
(Italy) M Viola	6	6^{5}	5
2	(Germany) S Greul	4	7	7

Second round
5	(Italy) A di Mauro	6	2	6
(United States) K Kim	1	6	2
Q	(Brazil) L Kirche	3	2
4	(Czech Republic) J Pospíšil	6	6
(Serbia) N Ćirić	7	4	6^{3}
(Slovakia) I Klec	5	6	7
(Croatia) A Veić	3	1
2	(Germany) S Greul	6	6

Quarterfinals
5	(Italy) A di Mauro	7	4	6^{4}
4	(Czech Republic) J Pospíšil	6^{4}	6	7
(Slovakia) I Klec	2	0
2	(Germany) S Greul	6	6

Semifinals
4	(Czech Republic) J Pospíšil	w/o
2	(Germany) S Greul
