= 2016 Morocco Tennis Tour – Meknes – Doubles =

Meknes – Doubles
- 2016 Morocco Tennis Tour – Meknes

Final
- Champions: (Switzerland) Luca Margaroli; (Egypt) Mohamed Safwat
- Runners-up: (Spain) Pedro Martínez; (Spain) Oriol Roca Batalla
- Score: 6–4, 6–4

Events
Singles	Doubles
← 2015 ·	Morocco Tennis Tour – Meknes	· 2017 →

Kevin Krawietz and Maximilian Marterer were the defending champions but only Marterer chose to defend his title, partnering Nils Langer. Langer and Marterer withdrew in the first round.

Luca Margaroli and Mohamed Safwat won the title after defeating Pedro Martínez and Oriol Roca Batalla 6–4, 6–4 in the final.

== Seeds ==
1. (Belgium) Sander Gillé / (Belgium) Joran Vliegen (quarterfinals)
2. (Belarus) Uladzimir Ignatik / (Netherlands) Mark Vervoort (semifinals)
3. (Switzerland) Luca Margaroli / (Egypt) Mohamed Safwat (champions)
4. (Spain) Pedro Martínez / (Spain) Oriol Roca Batalla (final)

== Draw ==
=== Key ===
- Q = Qualifier
- WC = Wild card
- LL = Lucky loser
- Alt = Alternate
- SE = Special exempt
- PR = Protected ranking
- ITF = ITF entry
- JE = Junior exempt
- w/o = Walkover
- r = Retired
- d = Defaulted
- SR = Special ranking

First round

Quarterfinals

Semifinals

Final

1
- (Belgium) S Gillé
- (Belgium) J Vliegen
6^{6}
6
[10]

- (Argentina) F Coria
- (Argentina) T Lipovšek Puches
7^{8}
4
[5]

1
- (Belgium) S Gillé
- (Belgium) J Vliegen
6^{2}
5

- (Canada) S Diez
- (Spain) D Pérez Sanz
5
6
[10]

- (Canada) S Diez
- (Spain) D Pérez Sanz
7^{7}
7

- (Belgium) G Gigounon
- (France) M Janvier
7
4
[3]

- (Canada) S Diez
- (Spain) D Pérez Sanz
4
4

3
- (Switzerland) L Margaroli
- (Egypt) M Safwat
6
6

3
- (Switzerland) L Margaroli
- (Egypt) M Safwat
6
6

- (Russia) I Nedelko
- (Russia) A Zhurbin
2
2

3
- (Switzerland) L Margaroli
- (Egypt) M Safwat
6
1
[11]

(France) M Chazal
(Belgium) Clément Geens
w/o

(France) M Chazal
(Belgium) C Geens
4
6
[9]

WC
- (Morocco) A Ahouda
- (Morocco) Y Idmbarek

3
- (Switzerland) L Margaroli
- (Egypt) M Safwat
6
6

- (Spain) P Toledo Bagué
- (Spain) M Vilella Martínez
w/o

4
- (Spain) P Martínez
- (Spain) O Roca Batalla
4
4

- (Germany) N Langer
- (Germany) M Marterer

- (Spain) P Toledo Bagué
- (Spain) M Vilella Martínez
6
2
[10]

(Netherlands) Colin van Beem
(Netherlands) Lennert van der Linden

4
- (Spain) P Martínez
- (Spain) O Roca Batalla
3
6
[12]

4
- (Spain) P Martínez
- (Spain) O Roca Batalla
w/o

4
- (Spain) P Martínez
- (Spain) O Roca Batalla
7^{8}
6

(Italy) A Brizzi
(Austria) Gibril Diarra
7
6

2
- (Belarus) U Ignatik
- (Netherlands) M Vervoort
6^{6}
4

WC
- (Morocco) Khalid Allouch
- (Morocco) M Jdi
5
1

(Italy) A Brizzi
(Austria) G Diarra

WC
- (Morocco) Mohamed Belcora
- (Morocco) M Saber
2
1

2
- (Belarus) U Ignatik
- (Netherlands) M Vervoort
w/o

2
- (Belarus) U Ignatik
- (Netherlands) M Vervoort
6
6
