= 2010 Morocco Tennis Tour – Meknes =

- Date: February 22 – February 28
- Edition: 3rd
- Location: Meknes, Morocco

Champions

Singles
- (Ukraine) Oleksandr Dolgopolov Jr.

Doubles
- (Spain) Pablo Andújar / (Italy) Flavio Cipolla
- Morocco Tennis Tour – Meknes

The 2010 Morocco Tennis Tour – Meknes was a professional tennis tournament played on outdoor clay courts. It was part of the 2010 ATP Challenger Tour. It took place in Meknes, Morocco between 22 and 28 February 2010.

== ATP entrants ==
=== Seeds ===
Country	Player	Rank	Seed
BEL	Steve Darcis	104	1
SLO	Blaž Kavčič	112	2
UKR	Oleksandr Dolgopolov Jr.	116	3
ESP	Pere Riba	122	4
POR	Rui Machado	127	5
ESP	Iván Navarro	132	6
ESP	David Marrero	144	7
ESP	Pablo Andújar	161	8

- Rankings are as of February 15, 2010.

=== Other entrants ===
The following players received wildcards into the singles main draw:

- (Morocco) Reda El Amrani
- (Morocco) Anas Fattar
- (Morocco) Hicham Khaddari
- (Morocco) Mehdi Ziadi

The following players received entry from the qualifying draw:

- (Italy) Francesco Aldi
- (Spain) Pablo Carreño Busta
- (Spain) Íñigo Cervantes Huegun
- (Spain) Carles Poch Gradin

== Champions ==
=== Singles ===
(Ukraine) Oleksandr Dolgopolov Jr. def. (Portugal) Rui Machado, 7–5, 6–2

=== Doubles ===
(Spain) Pablo Andújar / (Italy) Flavio Cipolla def. (Ukraine) Oleksandr Dolgopolov Jr. / (Ukraine) Artem Smirnov, 6–2, 6–2
