= 2016 Morocco Tennis Tour – Meknes =

- Date: 12–17 September
- Edition: 9th
- Location: Meknes, Morocco

Champions

Singles
- (Germany) Maximilian Marterer

Doubles
- (Switzerland) Luca Margaroli / (Egypt) Mohamed Safwat
- Morocco Tennis Tour – Meknes

The 2016 Morocco Tennis Tour – Meknes was a professional tennis tournament played on clay courts. It was the ninth edition of the tournament which was part of the 2016 ATP Challenger Tour. It took place in Meknes, Morocco between 12 and 17 September 2016.

== Singles main-draw entrants ==
=== Seeds ===
Country	Player	Rank^{1}	Seed
ESP	Roberto Carballés Baena	103	1
BEL	Arthur De Greef	138	2
CAN	Steven Diez	163	3
EGY	Mohamed Safwat	221	4
BLR	Uladzimir Ignatik	236	5
BEL	Yannik Reuter	237	6
ESP	David Pérez Sanz	238	7
GER	Maximilian Marterer	251	8

- ^{1} Rankings are as of August 29, 2016.

=== Other entrants ===
The following players received wildcards into the singles main draw:

- (Morocco) Ayoub Chakrouni
- (Morocco) Yassine Idmbarek
- (Morocco) Mehdi Jdi
- (Morocco) Amine Ahouda

The following player received entry into the singles main draw with protected ranking:

- (Italy) Alberto Brizzi

The following player entered as an alternate:

- (Chile) Bastián Malla

The following players received entry from the qualifying draw:

- (Spain) Mario Vilella Martínez
- (Netherlands) Linnert van der Linden
- (Austria) Gibril Diarra
- (Russia) Alexander Zhurbin

The following players entered as lucky losers:

- (Belgium) Sander Gillé
- (Belgium) Omar Salman
- (Spain) Pol Toledo Bagué

== Champions ==
=== Singles ===
- (Germany) Maximilian Marterer def. (Belarus) Uladzimir Ignatik, 7–6^{(7–4)}, 6–3.

=== Doubles ===
- (Switzerland) Luca Margaroli / (Egypt) Mohamed Safwat def. (Spain) Pedro Martínez / (Spain) Oriol Roca Batalla, 6–4, 6–4.
