= 2013 Morocco Tennis Tour – Meknes =

- Date: 9–15 September
- Edition: 6th
- Location: Meknes, Morocco

Champions

Singles
- (Germany) Cedrik-Marcel Stebe

Doubles
- (Italy) Alessandro Giannessi / (Italy) Gianluca Naso
- Morocco Tennis Tour – Meknes

The 2013 Morocco Tennis Tour – Meknes was a professional tennis tournament played on clay courts. It was the sixth edition of the tournament which was part of the 2013 ATP Challenger Tour. It took place in Meknes, Morocco between 9 and 15 September 2013.

== Singles main-draw entrants ==
=== Seeds ===
Country	Player	Rank^{1}	Seed
FRA	David Guez	167	1
ITA	Thomas Fabbiano	176	2
GER	Cedrik-Marcel Stebe	183	3
FRA	Florent Serra	206	4
FRA	Lucas Pouille	214	5
AUT	Dominic Thiem	216	6
ESP	Jordi Samper-Montana	229	7
CAN	Steven Diez	235	8

- ^{1} Rankings are as of August 26, 2013.

=== Other entrants ===
The following players received wildcards into the singles main draw:

- (Morocco) Hicham Khaddari
- (Morocco) Yassine Idmbarek
- (Morocco) Younès Rachidi
- (Morocco) Mehdi Ziadi

The following players received entry into the singles main draw as an alternate:

- (Italy) Daniele Giorgini

The following players received entry from the qualifying draw:

- (Austria) Lukas Jastraunig
- (France) Michael Bois
- (Austria) Marc Rath
- (France) Laurent Lokoli

== Champions ==
=== Singles ===
(Germany) Cedrik-Marcel Stebe def. (Belgium) Yannik Reuter 6–1, 4–6, 6–2

=== Doubles ===
(Italy) Alessandro Giannessi / (Italy) Gianluca Naso def. (Spain) Gerard Granollers / (Spain) Jordi Samper-Montana 7–5, 7–6^{(7–3)}
