= 2015 Morocco Tennis Tour – Meknes – Doubles =

Meknes – Doubles
- 2015 Morocco Tennis Tour – Meknes

Final
- Champions: (Germany) Kevin Krawietz; (Germany) Maximilian Marterer
- Runners-up: (Italy) Gianluca Naso (Italy) Riccardo Sinicropi
- Score: 7–5, 6–1

Events
Singles	Doubles
- Morocco Tennis Tour – Meknes

Hans Podlipnik and Stefano Travaglia were the defending champions, but chose not to participate.

== Seeds ==
1. (Italy) Matteo Viola / (Italy) Matteo Volante (first round)
2. (Romania) Patrick Grigoriu / (Spain) Enrique López Pérez (first round)
3. (United States) James Cerretani / (Serbia) Nikola Mektić (quarterfinals)
4. (Argentina) Facundo Argüello / (Argentina) Tomás Lipovšek Puches (semifinal, withdrew)

== Draw ==
Key

- Q = Qualifier
- WC = Wild card
- LL = Lucky loser
- Alt = Alternate
- ITF = ITF entry
- PR = Protected ranking
- SR = Special ranking
- SE = Special exempt
- JE = Junior exempt
- JR = Junior Accelerator Programme entrant
- CO = College Accelerator Programme entrant
- NG = Next Gen Accelerator Program entrant
- w/o = Walkover
- r = Retired
- d = Defaulted

First round

Quarterfinals

Semifinals

Final

1
(Italy) M Viola
(Italy) Matteo Volante
4
7
[15]

- (Germany) K Krawietz
- (Germany) M Marterer
6
5
[17]

- (Germany) K Krawietz
- (Germany) M Marterer
6
6

- (Austria) G Melzer
- (Netherlands) M Vervoort
6
2
[10]

- (Austria) G Melzer
- (Netherlands) M Vervoort
3
4

- (Spain) R Carballés Baena
- (Portugal) R Machado
2
6
[7]

- (Germany) K Krawietz
- (Germany) M Marterer
7
0
[10]

3
- (United States) J Cerretani
- (Serbia) N Mektić
6
6

PR
- (Belgium) Y Reuter
- (France) S Robert
5
6
[7]

Alt
- (Romania) D Dima
- (Bulgaria) D Kuzmanov
3
3

3
- (United States) J Cerretani
- (Serbia) N Mektić
6^{3}
3

PR
- (Belgium) Y Reuter
- (France) S Robert
6^{4}
6
[11]

PR
- (Belgium) Y Reuter
- (France) S Robert
7^{7}
6

- (Slovakia) F Horanský
- (Serbia) N Milojević
7^{7}
4
[9]

- (Germany) K Krawietz
- (Germany) M Marterer
7
6

- (Russia) Kirill Dmitriev
- (Kazakhstan) D Popko
6
6

(Italy) G Naso
(Italy) R Sinicropi
5
1

WC
(Morocco) Khalid Allouch
(Morocco) Ayoub Chakrouni
1
1

- (Russia) K Dmitriev
- (Kazakhstan) D Popko
5
3

- (Switzerland) L Margaroli
- (France) A Musialek
6^{3}
7
[5]

4
- (Argentina) F Argüello
- (Argentina) T Lipovšek Puches
7
6

4
- (Argentina) F Argüello
- (Argentina) T Lipovšek Puches
7^{7}
5
[10]

4
- (Argentina) F Argüello
- (Argentina) T Lipovšek Puches

WC
- (Morocco) A Ahouda
- (Morocco) Y Rachidi
0
2

(Italy) G Naso
(Italy) R Sinicropi
w/o

PR
- (Portugal) G Elias
- (Portugal) P Sousa
6
6

PR
- (Portugal) G Elias
- (Portugal) P Sousa
1
6
[3]

(Italy) G Naso
(Italy) Riccardo Sinicropi
6
6

(Italy) G Naso
(Italy) R Sinicropi
6
3
[10]

2
- (Romania) P Grigoriu
- (Spain) E López Pérez
4
2
