= 2013 Distalnet Tennis Cup – Singles =

Singles
- 2013 Distalnet Tennis Cup

Final
- Champion: (Spain) Pere Riba
- Runner-up: (Colombia) Santiago Giraldo
- Score: 7–6^{(7–5)}, 2–6, 7–6^{(8–6)}

Events
Singles	Doubles
← 2012 ·	Internazionali di Tennis dell'Umbria	· 2014 →

Andrey Kuznetsov was the defending champion but decided not to participate.
Pere Riba beat Santiago Giraldo 7–6^{(7–5)}, 2–6, 7–6^{(8–6)}, to win the title.

== Seeds ==
1. (Spain) Albert Ramos (second round)
2. (Italy) Paolo Lorenzi (semifinals)
3. (Colombia) Santiago Giraldo (final)
4. (Argentina) Martín Alund (first round)
5. (Portugal) João Sousa (quarterfinals)
6. (Slovakia) Andrej Martin (quarterfinals)
7. (Argentina) Renzo Olivo (first round)
8. (Italy) Gianluca Naso (quarterfinals)

== Draw ==
=== Key ===
- Q = Qualifier
- WC = Wild card
- LL = Lucky loser
- Alt = Alternate
- SE = Special exempt
- PR = Protected ranking
- ITF = ITF entry
- JE = Junior exempt
- w/o = Walkover
- r = Retired
- d = Defaulted
- SR = Special ranking

=== Finals ===
Semifinals
WC	(Italy) Thomas Fabbiano	6^{1}	3
3	(Colombia) Santiago Giraldo	7^{7}	6
PR	(Spain) Pere Riba	1	5
2	(Italy) Paolo Lorenzi	6	5^{r}

Final
3	(Colombia) Santiago Giraldo	6^{5}	6	6^{6}
PR	(Spain) Pere Riba	7^{7}	2	7^{8}

=== Top half ===
First round
1/WC	(Spain) A Ramos	6	6
Q	(Italy) A Brizzi	4	2
(Portugal) P Sousa	4	4
WC	(Italy) T Fabbiano	6	6
Q	(Croatia) M Delić	6	6
(Spain) Marc Giner	1	2
(Spain) J Checa-Calvo	6	4	4
6	(Slovakia) A Martin	4	6	6
3	(Colombia) S Giraldo	6	7^{7}
(Netherlands) B Westerhof	4	6^{3}
(Italy) P Starace	6	6
(Slovakia) J Kovalík	1	1
(Spain) G Granollers	6^{1}	6	7^{7}
Q	(Italy) A Virgili	7^{7}	4	6^{5}
(Belgium) A De Greef	3	4
8	(Italy) G Naso	6	6

Second round
1/WC	(Spain) A Ramos	4	2
WC	(Italy) T Fabbiano	6	6
Q	(Croatia) M Delić	4	4
6	(Slovakia) A Martin	6	6
3	(Colombia) S Giraldo	6	7^{7}
(Italy) P Starace	4	6^{4}
(Spain) G Granollers	4	3
8	(Italy) G Naso	6	6

Quarterfinals
WC	(Italy) T Fabbiano	7^{7}	6
6	(Slovakia) A Martin	6^{3}	4
3	(Colombia) S Giraldo	6	6^{3}	6
8	(Italy) G Naso	4	7^{7}	3

Semifinals
WC	(Italy) T Fabbiano	6^{1}	3
3	(Colombia) S Giraldo	7^{7}	6

=== Bottom half ===
First round
5	(Portugal) J Sousa	6	7
(France) L Pouille	4	5
WC	(Italy) M Cecchinato	4	7^{7}	6
(Italy) A Giannessi	6	6^{5}	2
Q	(Germany) R Becker	6	6
(Belgium) Y Mertens	4	4
PR	(Spain) P Riba	1	7^{8}	6
4	(Argentina) M Alund	6	6^{6}	4
7	(Argentina) R Olivo	3	0
(France) M Teixeira	6	6
(Italy) A di Mauro	3	6	6^{1}
(Chile) H Podlipnik-Castillo	6	1	7^{7}
(Argentina) A Molteni	6	4	7
(Japan) T Daniel	4	6	5
WC	(Italy) A Arnaboldi	3	3
2	(Italy) P Lorenzi	6	6

Second round
5	(Portugal) J Sousa	6^{5}	6	6
WC	(Italy) M Cecchinato	7^{7}	3	4
Q	(Germany) R Becker	3	6	6^{3}
PR	(Spain) P Riba	6	3	7^{7}
(France) M Teixeira	4	2
(Chile) H Podlipnik-Castillo	6	6
(Argentina) A Molteni	2	2
2	(Italy) P Lorenzi	6	6

Quarterfinals
5	(Portugal) J Sousa	6	3	6^{5}
PR	(Spain) P Riba	3	6	7^{7}
(Chile) H Podlipnik-Castillo	4	3
2	(Italy) P Lorenzi	6	6

Semifinals
PR	(Spain) P Riba	1	5
2	(Italy) P Lorenzi	6	5^{r}
