= 2013 Grand Prix Hassan II – Singles =

Singles
- 2013 Grand Prix Hassan II

Final
- Champion: (Spain) Tommy Robredo
- Runner-up: (South Africa) Kevin Anderson
- Score: 7–6^{(8–6)}, 4–6, 6–3

Events
Singles	Doubles
- Grand Prix Hassan II

Pablo Andújar was the two-time defending champion but lost in the first round to fellow countryman Pablo Carreño Busta.
Tommy Robredo won the title, defeating Kevin Anderson in the final, 7–6^{(8–6)}, 4–6, 6–3.

== Seeds ==
The top four seeds received a bye into the second round.

1. (Switzerland) Stanislas Wawrinka (semifinals)
2. (South Africa) Kevin Anderson (final)
3. (Slovakia) Martin Kližan (semifinals)
4. (France) Benoît Paire (quarterfinals)
5. (Austria) Jürgen Melzer (first round)
6. (Spain) Daniel Gimeno Traver (first round)
7. (Netherlands) Robin Haase (quarterfinals)
8. (Slovenia) Grega Žemlja (quarterfinals)

== Draw ==
Key

- Q = Qualifier
- WC = Wild card
- LL = Lucky loser
- Alt = Alternate
- ITF = ITF entry
- PR = Protected ranking
- SR = Special ranking
- SE = Special exempt
- JE = Junior exempt
- JR = Junior Accelerator Programme entrant
- CO = College Accelerator Programme entrant
- NG = Next Gen Accelerator Program entrant
- w/o = Walkover
- r = Retired
- d = Defaulted

=== Finals ===
Semifinals
1/WC	(Switzerland) Stanislas Wawrinka	6	3	2
(Spain) Tommy Robredo	1	6	6
3	(Slovakia) Martin Kližan	6	4	2
2	(South Africa) Kevin Anderson	2	6	6

Final
(Spain) Tommy Robredo	7^{8}	4	6
2	(South Africa) Kevin Anderson	6^{6}	6	3

=== Top half ===
First round
WC	(Morocco) M Ziadi	2	4
(Slovenia) B Kavčič	6	6
(France) É Roger-Vasselin	3	6	6
(Spain) A Montañés	6	4	4
(Spain) G García López	7^{7}	3	6
6	(Spain) D Gimeno Traver	6^{5}	6	3
(Slovenia) A Bedene	6	6
Q	(France) M Gicquel	1	4
(Spain) T Robredo	7^{7}	6
(France) G Rufin	6^{2}	4
(Germany) T Kamke	6	6
5	(Austria) J Melzer	3	3

Second round
1/WC	(Switzerland) S Wawrinka	4	6	6
(Slovenia) B Kavčič	6	2	1
(France) É Roger-Vasselin	7^{7}	6^{3}	2
(Spain) G García López	6^{4}	7^{7}	6
4	(France) B Paire	4	6	6
(Slovenia) A Bedene	6	4	3
(Spain) T Robredo	6	7
(Germany) T Kamke	4	5

Quarterfinals
1/WC	(Switzerland) S Wawrinka	6	6
(Spain) G García López	1	2
4	(France) B Paire	6^{4}	6	0
(Spain) T Robredo	7^{7}	2	6

Semifinals
1/WC	(Switzerland) S Wawrinka	6	3	2
(Spain) T Robredo	1	6	6

=== Bottom half ===
First round
7	(Netherlands) R Haase	6	2	7
(Spain) R Bautista Agut	3	6	5
(Belgium) S Darcis	3	4
(France) K de Schepper	6	6
(France) P-H Mathieu	3	5
Q	(Italy) F Volandri	6	7
8	(Slovenia) G Žemlja	6^{3}	7	7^{7}
(Germany) M Bachinger	7^{7}	5	6^{2}
WC	(Morocco) Y Rachidi	3	7^{10}	1
Q	(Switzerland) H Laaksonen	6	6^{8}	6
(Spain) P Andújar	4	6	3
Q	(Spain) P Carreño Busta	6	2	6

Second round
7	(Netherlands) R Haase	6	6^{2}	6
(France) K de Schepper	2	7^{7}	3
Q	(Italy) F Volandri	4	6^{5}
3	(Slovakia) M Kližan	6	7^{7}
8	(Slovenia) G Žemlja	7^{7}	6
Q	(Switzerland) H Laaksonen	6^{5}	1
Q	(Spain) P Carreño Busta	3	3
2	(South Africa) K Anderson	6	6

Quarterfinals
7	(Netherlands) R Haase	5	1
3	(Slovakia) M Kližan	7	6
8	(Slovenia) G Žemlja	4	4
2	(South Africa) K Anderson	6	6

Semifinals
3	(Slovakia) M Kližan	6	4	2
2	(South Africa) K Anderson	2	6	6

== Qualifying ==
=== Seeds ===
1. (Italy) Filippo Volandri (qualified)
2. (France) Marc Gicquel (qualified)
3. (Germany) Björn Phau (qualifying competition)
4. (France) Florent Serra (qualifying competition)
5. (Spain) Sergio Gutiérrez Ferrol (first round)
6. (Italy) Gianluca Naso (second round)
7. (Italy) Potito Starace (first round)
8. (Netherlands) Matwé Middelkoop (first round, retired)

=== Qualifiers ===
1. (Italy) Filippo Volandri
2. (France) Marc Gicquel
3. (Switzerland) Henri Laaksonen
4. (Spain) Pablo Carreño Busta

=== Draw ===
==== First qualifier ====
First round
1	(Italy) Filippo Volandri	6	6
WC	(Morocco) Omar El Hizaz	1	0
(Austria) Alexander Peya
(Spain) Roberto Carballés Baena	w/o
WC	(Morocco) Soufiane Sahli	3	2
(Austria) Philipp Oswald	6	6
(Morocco) Yassine Idmbarek	6	6^{2}	7^{8}
5	(Spain) Sergio Gutiérrez Ferrol	3	7^{7}	6^{6}

Second round
1	(Italy) Filippo Volandri	6	6
(Spain) Roberto Carballés Baena	1	3
(Austria) Philipp Oswald	6	6
(Morocco) Yassine Idmbarek	3	3

Qualifying competition
1	(Italy) Filippo Volandri	3	6	6
(Austria) Philipp Oswald	6	2	3

==== Second qualifier ====
First round
2	(France) Marc Gicquel	6	6
WC	(Morocco) Mohamed Ali Kraimi	1	1
(Switzerland) Sandro Ehrat	6	6
(Algeria) Lamine Ouahab	1	2
(Morocco) Ayoub Chakrouni	3	1
(Austria) Dominic Thiem	6	6
(Italy) Alessandro Giannessi	3	6^{6}
6	(Italy) Gianluca Naso	6	7^{8}

Second round
2	(France) Marc Gicquel	6	6
(Switzerland) Sandro Ehrat	3	4
(Austria) Dominic Thiem	6^{8}	6	6
6	(Italy) Gianluca Naso	7^{10}	4	2

Qualifying competition
2	(France) Marc Gicquel	6	1	6
(Austria) Dominic Thiem	4	6	4

==== Third qualifier ====
First round
3	(Germany) Björn Phau	6	6
WC	(Morocco) Youssef Tamimount	0	1
WC	(Morocco) Mohamed Adnaoui	4	4
(Slovakia) Michal Mertiňák	6	6
(Czech Republic) Michal Schmid	7	6
(United Kingdom) Ken Skupski	5	1
(Switzerland) Henri Laaksonen	7^{8}	1	6
7	(Italy) Potito Starace	6^{6}	6	4

Second round
3	(Germany) Björn Phau	6	6
(Slovakia) Michal Mertiňák	2	1
(Czech Republic) Michal Schmid	0	6^{1}
(Switzerland) Henri Laaksonen	6	7^{7}

Qualifying competition
3	(Germany) Björn Phau	3	1
(Switzerland) Henri Laaksonen	6	6

==== Fourth qualifier ====
First round
4	(France) Florent Serra	6	6
(Morocco) Reda Karakhi	0	2
(Spain) Rafael Mazón-Hernández	6	1	6
(Morocco) Khalid Allouch	3	6	2
(Czech Republic) František Čermák	3	2
(Spain) Guillermo Olaso	6	6
(Spain) Pablo Carreño Busta	6^{7}	6	3
8	(Netherlands) Matwé Middelkoop	7^{9}	2	0^{r}

Second round
4	(France) Florent Serra	6	7
(Spain) Rafael Mazón-Hernández	3	5
(Spain) Guillermo Olaso	1	1
(Spain) Pablo Carreño Busta	6	6

Qualifying competition
4	(France) Florent Serra	6	3	1
(Spain) Pablo Carreño Busta	2	6	6
