= 2013 Grand Prix Hassan II =

- Date: 7–14 April
- Edition: 29th
- Category: World Tour 250
- Draw: 28S / 16D
- Prize money: €467,800
- Surface: Clay / outdoor
- Location: Casablanca, Morocco

Champions

Singles
- (Spain) Tommy Robredo

Doubles
- (Austria) Julian Knowle / (Slovakia) Filip Polášek
- Grand Prix Hassan II

The 2013 Grand Prix Hassan II was a professional men's tennis tournament played on outdoor clay courts. It was the 29th edition of the tournament, which was part of the ATP World Tour 250 series of the 2013 ATP World Tour. It took place in Casablanca, Morocco between 7 April and 14 April 2013. Unseeded Tommy Robredo won the singles title.

== Singles main-draw entrants ==
=== Seeds ===
Country	Player	Rank^{1}	Seed
SUI	Stanislas Wawrinka	17	1
RSA	Kevin Anderson	29	2
SVK	Martin Kližan	32	3
FRA	Benoît Paire	33	4
AUT	Jürgen Melzer	37	5
ESP	Daniel Gimeno Traver	48	6
NED	Robin Haase	52	7
SLO	Grega Žemlja	54	8

- ^{1} Rankings are as of 1 April 2013.

=== Other entrants ===
The following players received wildcards into the singles main draw:

- (Morocco) Younès Rachidi
- (Switzerland) Stanislas Wawrinka
- (Morocco) Mehdi Ziadi

The following players received entry from the qualifying draw:

- (Spain) Pablo Carreño Busta
- (France) Marc Gicquel
- (Switzerland) Henri Laaksonen
- (Italy) Filippo Volandri

=== Withdrawals ===
Before the tournament

- (Germany) Daniel Brands
- (Spain) Marcel Granollers
- (Australia) Marinko Matosevic
- (Spain) Albert Ramos
- (Portugal) João Sousa
- (Ukraine) Sergiy Stakhovsky

== Doubles main-draw entrants ==
=== Seeds ===
Country	Player	Country	Player	Rank^{1}	Seed
AUT	Julian Knowle	SVK	Filip Polášek	65	1
CZE	Lukáš Dlouhý	AUS	Paul Hanley	80	2
CZE	František Čermák	SVK	Michal Mertiňák	88	3
ITA	Daniele Bracciali	ITA	Potito Starace	97	4

- Rankings are as of 1 April 2013.

=== Other entrants ===
The following pairs received wildcards into the doubles main draw:

- (Morocco) Yassine Idmbarek / (Morocco) Younès Rachidi
- (Morocco) Mohamed Saber / (Morocco) Mehdi Ziadi

== Finals ==
=== Singles ===
- (Spain) Tommy Robredo defeated (South Africa) Kevin Anderson, 7–6^{(8–6)}, 4–6, 6–3

=== Doubles ===
- (Austria) Julian Knowle / (Slovakia) Filip Polášek defeated (Germany) Dustin Brown / (Germany) Christopher Kas, 6–3, 6–2
