= 2015 Morocco Tennis Tour – Meknes =

- Date: 7–13 September
- Edition: 8th
- Location: Meknes, Morocco

Champions

Singles
- (Spain) Daniel Muñoz de la Nava

Doubles
- (Germany) Kevin Krawietz / (Germany) Maximilian Marterer
- Morocco Tennis Tour – Meknes

The 2015 Morocco Tennis Tour – Meknes was a professional tennis tournament played on clay courts. It was the eighth edition of the tournament which was part of the 2015 ATP Challenger Tour. It took place in Meknes, Morocco between 7 and 13 September 2015.

== Singles main-draw entrants ==
=== Seeds ===
Country	Player	Rank^{1}	Seed
ESP	Daniel Muñoz de la Nava	89	1
ARG	Facundo Argüello	140	2
ESP	Roberto Carballés Baena	159	3
AUT	Gerald Melzer	170	4
POR	Gastão Elias	187	5
ITA	Gianluca Naso	193	6
ITA	Matteo Viola	201	7
FRA	Mathias Bourgue	210	8

- ^{1} Rankings are as of August 31, 2015.

=== Other entrants ===
The following players received wildcards into the singles main draw:

- (Morocco) Amine Ahouda
- (Morocco) Khalid Allouch
- (Morocco) Ayoub Chakrouni
- (Morocco) Yassine Idmbarek

The following players received entry from the qualifying draw:

- (Italy) Claudio Fortuna
- (Germany) Kevin Krawietz
- (Argentina) Tomás Lipovšek Puches
- (Belgium) Yannik Reuter

== Champions ==
=== Singles ===
- (Spain) Daniel Muñoz de la Nava def. (Spain) Roberto Carballés Baena 6–4, 6–2

=== Doubles ===
- (Germany) Kevin Krawietz / (Germany) Maximilian Marterer def. (Italy) Gianluca Naso / (Italy) Riccardo Sinicropi 7–5, 6–1
