= 2013 Grand Prix Hassan II – Doubles =

Doubles
- 2013 Grand Prix Hassan II

Final
- Champions: (Austria) Julian Knowle; (Slovakia) Filip Polášek
- Runners-up: (Germany) Dustin Brown; (Germany) Christopher Kas
- Score: 6–3, 6–2

Events
Singles	Doubles
- Grand Prix Hassan II

Dustin Brown and Paul Hanley were the defending champions, but they decided not to compete together this year.
Brown played alongside Christopher Kas and defeated Hanley and Lukáš Dlouhý in the first round.
Julian Knowle and Filip Polášek won the title, defeating Brown and Kas in the final, 6–3, 6–2.

== Seeds ==
1. (Austria) Julian Knowle / (Slovakia) Filip Polášek (champions)
2. (Czech Republic) Lukáš Dlouhý / (Australia) Paul Hanley (first round)
3. (Czech Republic) František Čermák / (Slovakia) Michal Mertiňák (quarterfinals)
4. (Italy) Daniele Bracciali / (Italy) Potito Starace (quarterfinals)

== Draw ==
Key

- Q = Qualifier
- WC = Wild card
- LL = Lucky loser
- Alt = Alternate
- ITF = ITF entry
- PR = Protected ranking
- SR = Special ranking
- SE = Special exempt
- JE = Junior exempt
- JR = Junior Accelerator Programme entrant
- CO = College Accelerator Programme entrant
- NG = Next Gen Accelerator Program entrant
- w/o = Walkover
- r = Retired
- d = Defaulted

=== Draw ===
First round

Quarterfinals

Semifinals

Final

1
- (Austria) J Knowle
- (Slovakia) F Polášek
6^{5}
7^{7}
[12]

- (Germany) M Emmrich
- (Australia) R Junaid
7^{7}
6^{4}
[10]

1
- (Austria) J Knowle
- (Slovakia) F Polášek
6
4
[10]

- (France) B Paire
- (Switzerland) S Wawrinka
6
2
[10]

- (France) B Paire
- (Switzerland) S Wawrinka
0
6
[4]

- (Germany) T Kamke
- (Germany) B Phau
4
6
[5]

1
- (Austria) J Knowle
- (Slovakia) F Polášek
0
6
[10]

3
- (Czech Republic) F Čermák
- (Slovakia) M Mertiňák
6
7^{7}

- (Slovakia) M Kližan
- (Slovakia) I Zelenay
6
3
[5]

WC
- (Morocco) Y Idmbarek
- (Morocco) Y Rachidi
4
6^{4}

3
- (Czech Republic) F Čermák
- (Slovakia) M Mertiňák
6
5
[3]

- (Slovakia) M Kližan
- (Slovakia) I Zelenay
6
6

- (Slovakia) M Kližan
- (Slovakia) I Zelenay
3
7
[10]

- (United Kingdom) J Delgado
- (Belgium) D Norman
4
0

1
- (Austria) J Knowle
- (Slovakia) F Polášek
6
6

- (Slovenia) A Bedene
- (Poland) T Bednarek
7^{7}
6

- (Germany) D Brown
- (Germany) C Kas
3
2

- (Spain) P Andújar
- (Spain) G García López
6^{3}
0

- (Slovenia) A Bedene
- (Poland) T Bednarek
6
7

- (Russia) M Elgin
- (United Kingdom) K Skupski
7^{7}
6^{6}
[8]

4
- (Italy) D Bracciali
- (Italy) P Starace
3
5

4
- (Italy) D Bracciali
- (Italy) P Starace
6^{4}
7^{8}
[10]

- (Slovenia) A Bedene
- (Poland) T Bednarek
5
4

WC
- (Morocco) M Saber
- (Morocco) M Ziadi
3
2

- (Germany) D Brown
- (Germany) C Kas
7
6

- (Slovenia) B Kavčič
- (Slovenia) G Žemlja
6
6

- (Slovenia) B Kavčič
- (Slovenia) G Žemlja
3
2

- (Germany) D Brown
- (Germany) C Kas
3
7
[10]

- (Germany) D Brown
- (Germany) C Kas
6
6

2
- (Czech Republic) L Dlouhý
- (Australia) P Hanley
6
5
[6]
