= 2014 Grand Prix Hassan II – Doubles =

Doubles
- 2014 Grand Prix Hassan II

Final
- Champions: (Netherlands) Jean-Julien Rojer; (Romania) Horia Tecău
- Runners-up: (Poland) Tomasz Bednarek; (Czech Republic) Lukáš Dlouhý
- Score: 6–2, 6–2

Events
| Singles | Doubles |
- Grand Prix Hassan II

The 2014 Grand Prix Hassan II doubles was a professional tennis tournament played on clay courts in Casablanca, Morocco.

Julian Knowle and Filip Polášek were the defending champions, but Polášek chose not to participate. Knowle plays alongside Christopher Kas, but they lost in the first round to Tomasz Bednarek and Lukáš Dlouhý.
Jean-Julien Rojer and Horia Tecău won the title, defeating Bednarek and Dlouhý in the final, 6–2, 6–2.

== Seeds ==
1. (Netherlands) Jean-Julien Rojer / (Romania) Horia Tecău (champions)
2. (United Kingdom) Jamie Murray / (Australia) John Peers (semifinals)
3. (United Kingdom) Colin Fleming / (United Kingdom) Jonathan Marray (quarterfinals)
4. (Austria) Oliver Marach / (Romania) Florin Mergea (quarterfinals)

== Draw ==
Key

- Q = Qualifier
- WC = Wild card
- LL = Lucky loser
- Alt = Alternate
- ITF = ITF entry
- PR = Protected ranking
- SR = Special ranking
- SE = Special exempt
- JE = Junior exempt
- JR = Junior Accelerator Programme entrant
- CO = College Accelerator Programme entrant
- NG = Next Gen Accelerator Program entrant
- w/o = Walkover
- r = Retired
- d = Defaulted

=== Draw ===
First round

Quarterfinals

Semifinals

Final

1
- (Netherlands) J-J Rojer
- (Romania) H Tecău
6
6

- (Spain) A Montañés
- (Italy) F Volandri
1
4

1
- (Netherlands) J-J Rojer
- (Romania) H Tecău
6
6

Alt
- (Argentina) C Berlocq
- (Argentina) L Mayer
6
6

Alt
- (Argentina) C Berlocq
- (Argentina) L Mayer
1
1

WC
- (Morocco) L Ouahab
- (Morocco) M Ziadi
3
2

1
- (Netherlands) J-J Rojer
- (Romania) H Tecău
6
6

4
- (Austria) O Marach
- (Romania) F Mergea
6
6

- (Italy) D Bracciali
- (Argentina) F Delbonis
3
4

- (Kazakhstan) M Kukushkin
- (Kazakhstan) O Nedovyesov
3
1

4
- (Austria) O Marach
- (Romania) F Mergea
6^{3}
6
[6]

Alt
- (Austria) M Fischer
- (Netherlands) R Wassen
2
3

- (Italy) D Bracciali
- (Argentina) F Delbonis
7^{7}
3
[10]

- (Italy) D Bracciali
- (Argentina) F Delbonis
6
6

1
- (Netherlands) J-J Rojer
- (Romania) H Tecău
6
6

- (Germany) C Kas
- (Austria) J Knowle
3
4

- (Poland) T Bednarek
- (Czech Republic) L Dlouhý
2
2

- (Poland) T Bednarek
- (Czech Republic) L Dlouhý
6
6

- (Poland) T Bednarek
- (Czech Republic) L Dlouhý
2
6
[10]

- (Spain) G García López
- (Austria) P Oswald
2
4

3
- (United Kingdom) C Fleming
- (United Kingdom) J Marray
6
4
[8]

3
- (United Kingdom) C Fleming
- (United Kingdom) J Marray
6
6

- (Poland) T Bednarek
- (Czech Republic) L Dlouhý
6
7

- (Spain) P Carreño Busta
- (Portugal) J Sousa
6
4
[10]

2
- (United Kingdom) J Murray
- (Australia) J Peers
3
5

WC
- (Morocco) A Chakrouni
- (Morocco) Y Rachidi
1
6
[1]

- (Spain) P Carreño Busta
- (Portugal) J Sousa
4
2

- (Czech Republic) F Čermák
- (Russia) M Elgin
4
4

2
- (United Kingdom) J Murray
- (Australia) J Peers
6
6

2
- (United Kingdom) J Murray
- (Australia) J Peers
6
6
