= 2014 Grand Prix Hassan II =

- Date: 7–13 April
- Edition: 30th
- Category: World Tour 250
- Draw: 28S / 16D
- Prize money: €467,800
- Surface: Clay / outdoor
- Location: Casablanca, Morocco

Champions

Singles
- (Spain) Guillermo García López

Doubles
- (Netherlands) Jean-Julien Rojer / (Romania) Horia Tecău
- Grand Prix Hassan II

The 2014 Grand Prix Hassan II was a professional men's tennis tournament played on outdoor clay courts. It is the 30th edition of the tournament, which is part of the World Tour 250 category of the 2014 ATP World Tour. It took place in Casablanca, Morocco between 7 and 13 April 2014. Eight-seeded Guillermo García López won the singles title.

== Singles main-draw entrants ==
=== Seeds ===
Country	Player	Rank^{1}	Seed
RSA	Kevin Anderson	19	1
~~FRA~~	~~Gaël Monfils~~	~~25~~	~~2~~
FRA	Benoît Paire	33	3
ESP	Marcel Granollers	36	4
POR	João Sousa	38	5
ARG	Federico Delbonis	43	6
NED	Robin Haase	48	7
ESP	Guillermo García López	53	8

- ^{1} Rankings are as of March 31, 2014.

=== Other entrants ===
The following players received wildcards into the singles main draw:

- (Morocco) Hicham Khaddari
- (France) Gaël Monfils
- (Morocco) Lamine Ouahab

The following players received entry from the qualifying draw:

- (Spain) Roberto Carballés Baena
- (Belgium) David Goffin
- (Canada) Filip Peliwo
- (France) Gilles Simon

The following player received entry as a Lucky loser:

- (Russia) Andrey Kuznetsov

=== Withdrawals ===
Before the tournament

- (Spain) Pablo Andújar
- (Spain) Roberto Bautista Agut
- (France) Édouard Roger-Vasselin
- (France) Gaël Monfils

=== Retirements ===
- (Czech Republic) Jiří Veselý (sickness)

== Doubles main-draw entrants ==
=== Seeds ===
Country	Player	Country	Player	Rank^{1}	Seed
NED	Jean-Julien Rojer	ROU	Horia Tecău	55	1
GBR	Jamie Murray	AUS	John Peers	68	2
GBR	Colin Fleming	GBR	Jonathan Marray	78	3
AUT	Oliver Marach	ROU	Florin Mergea	90	4

- Rankings are as of March 31, 2014.

=== Other entrants ===
The following pairs received wildcards into the doubles main draw:

- (Morocco) Ayoub Chakrouni / (Morocco) Younès Rachidi
- (Morocco) Lamine Ouahab / (Morocco) Mehdi Ziadi

The following pairs received entry as alternates:

- (Argentina) Carlos Berlocq / (Argentina) Leonardo Mayer
- (Austria) Martin Fischer / (Netherlands) Rogier Wassen

=== Withdrawals ===
Before the tournament

- (Germany) Andre Begemann (left knee injury)
- (Sweden) Johan Brunström (wrist injury)

== Finals ==
=== Singles ===
- (Spain) Guillermo García López defeated (Spain) Marcel Granollers, 5–7, 6–4, 6–3

=== Doubles ===
- (Netherlands) Jean-Julien Rojer / (Romania) Horia Tecău defeated (Poland) Tomasz Bednarek / (Czech Republic) Lukáš Dlouhý, 6–2, 6–2
