= 2013 Distalnet Tennis Cup – Doubles =

Doubles
- 2013 Distalnet Tennis Cup

Final
- Champions: (Colombia) Santiago Giraldo (Colombia) Cristian Rodríguez
- Runners-up: (Italy) Andrea Arnaboldi (Italy) Gianluca Naso
- Score: 4–6, 7–6^{(7–2)}, [10–3]

Events
Singles	Doubles
← 2012 ·	Internazionali di Tennis dell'Umbria	· 2014 →

Martin Fischer and Philipp Oswald were the defending champions but decided not to participate.
Santiago Giraldo and Cristian Rodríguez won the title, by defeating Andrea Arnaboldi and Gianluca Naso 4–6, 7–6^{(7–2)}, [10–3]

== Seeds ==
1. (Argentina) Renzo Olivo / (Australia) Dane Propoggia (quarterfinals)
2. (Italy) Alessandro Motti / (Italy) Matteo Volante (quarterfinals)
3. (Philippines) Ruben Gonzales / (Australia) Chris Letcher (first round)
4. (Argentina) Guillermo Durán / (Argentina) Andrés Molteni (semifinals)

== Draw ==
=== Key ===
- Q = Qualifier
- WC = Wild card
- LL = Lucky loser
- Alt = Alternate
- SE = Special exempt
- PR = Protected ranking
- ITF = ITF entry
- JE = Junior exempt
- w/o = Walkover
- r = Retired
- d = Defaulted
- SR = Special ranking

=== Draw ===
First round
1	(Argentina) R Olivio (Australia) D Propoggia	6	6
WC	(Italy) Federico Cecconi (Italy) Lorenzo Santini	1	0
WC	(Italy) A Giannessi (Italy) A Virgili	4	7	[9]
(Colombia) S Giraldo (Colombia) C Rodríguez	6	5	[11]
4	(Argentina) G Durán (Argentina) A Molteni	6	6
(Japan) T Daniel (Venezuela) D Souto	1	0
(Spain) J Checa-Calvo (Spain) Mark Giner	6	3	[10]
WC	(Italy) Enrico Becuzzi (Italy) P Lorenzi	1	6	[8]
(Italy) A Arnaboldi (Italy) G Naso	6	6
(Slovakia) A Martin (Chile) H Podlipnik-Castillo	2	3
(Italy) M Cecchinato (Italy) A di Mauro	6	7
3	(Philippines) R Gonzales (Australia) Chris Letcher	3	5
(Portugal) P Sousa (Portugal) J Sousa	6	6
(Belgium) A De Greef (Belgium) Y Mertens	3	0
(Slovakia) N Gombos (Slovakia) J Kovalík	4	3
2	(Italy) A Motti (Italy) Matteo Volante	6	6

Quarterfinals
1	(Argentina) R Olivio (Australia) D Propoggia	3	4
(Colombia) S Giraldo (Colombia) C Rodríguez	6	6
4	(Argentina) G Durán (Argentina) A Molteni	6	6
(Spain) J Checa-Calvo (Spain) M Giner	2	2
(Italy) A Arnaboldi (Italy) G Naso	w/o
(Italy) M Cecchinato (Italy) A di Mauro
(Portugal) P Sousa (Portugal) J Sousa	6	4	[12]
2	(Italy) A Motti (Italy) M Volante	2	6	[10]

Semifinals
(Colombia) S Giraldo (Colombia) C Rodríguez	6	6
4	(Argentina) G Durán (Argentina) A Molteni	2	4
(Italy) A Arnaboldi (Italy) G Naso	6^{5}	6	[10]
(Portugal) P Sousa (Portugal) J Sousa	7^{7}	3	[7]

Final
(Colombia) S Giraldo (Colombia) C Rodríguez	4	7^{7}	[10]
(Italy) A Arnaboldi (Italy) G Naso	6	6^{2}	[3]
