= 2014 Morocco Tennis Tour – Meknes =

- Date: 15–20 September
- Edition: 7th
- Location: Meknes, Morocco

Champions

Singles
- (Belgium) Kimmer Coppejans

Doubles
- (Chile) Hans Podlipnik Castillo / (Italy) Stefano Travaglia
- Morocco Tennis Tour – Meknes

The 2014 Morocco Tennis Tour – Meknes was a professional tennis tournament played on clay courts. It was the seventh edition of the tournament which was part of the 2014 ATP Challenger Tour. It took place in Meknes, Morocco between 15 and 20 September 2014.

== Singles main-draw entrants ==
=== Seeds ===
Country	Player	Rank^{1}	Seed
ESP	Pablo Carreño	74	1
ESP	Albert Ramos	75	2
BIH	Damir Džumhur	113	3
ESP	Adrián Menéndez Maceiras	163	4
ESP	Roberto Carballés Baena	213	5
CHI	Hans Podlipnik Castillo	218	6
ESP	Rubén Ramírez Hidalgo	222	7
FRA	Lucas Pouille	225	8

- ^{1} Rankings are as of September 8, 2014.

=== Other entrants ===
The following players received wildcards into the singles main draw:

- (Morocco) Hicham Khaddari
- (Morocco) Yassine Idmbarek
- (Morocco) Lamine Ouahab
- (Morocco) Taha Tifnouti

The following players received entry from the qualifying draw:

- (Argentina) Pedro Cachin
- (Netherlands) Matwé Middelkoop
- (France) Julien Obry
- (Egypt) Sherif Sabry

== Champions ==
=== Singles ===
- (Belgium) Kimmer Coppejans def. (France) Lucas Pouille, 4–6, 6–2, 6–2

=== Doubles ===
- (Chile) Hans Podlipnik Castillo / (Italy) Stefano Travaglia def. (Spain) Gerard Granollers / (Spain) Jordi Samper Montaña, 6–2, 6–7^{(4–7)}, [10–7]
