= 2012 Morocco Tennis Tour – Meknes =

- Date: 20–26 February
- Edition: 5th
- Location: Meknes, Morocco

Champions

Singles
- (Russia) Evgeny Donskoy

Doubles
- (Spain) Adrián Menéndez / (Czech Republic) Jaroslav Pospíšil
- Morocco Tennis Tour – Meknes

The 2012 Morocco Tennis Tour – Meknes was a professional tennis tournament played on clay courts. It was the fifth edition of the tournament which was part of the 2012 ATP Challenger Tour. It took place in Meknes, Morocco between 20 and 26 February 2012.

== Singles main-draw entrants ==
=== Seeds ===
Country	Player	Rank^{1}	Seed
ROU	Adrian Ungur	100	1
AUT	Andreas Haider-Maurer	114	2
RUS	Evgeny Donskoy	141	3
ESP	Daniel Muñoz de la Nava	144	4
CZE	Jan Hájek	146	5
ITA	Matteo Viola	147	6
ESP	Pablo Carreño Busta	148	7
CZE	Ivo Minář	159	8

- ^{1} Rankings are as of February 13, 2012.

=== Other entrants ===
The following players received wildcards into the singles main draw:

- (Morocco) Omar Erramy
- (Morocco) Yassine Idmbarek
- (Morocco) Reda Karakhi
- (Morocco) Younès Rachidi

The following players received entry from the qualifying draw:

- (Italy) Alberto Brizzi
- (Poland) Marcin Gawron
- (Spain) Gerard Granollers
- (Germany) Bastian Knittel

== Champions ==
=== Singles ===
(Russia) Evgeny Donskoy def. (Romania) Adrian Ungur, 6–1, 6–3

=== Doubles ===
(Spain) Adrián Menéndez / (Czech Republic) Jaroslav Pospíšil vs. (Spain) Gerard Granollers / (Spain) Iván Navarro, 6–3, 3–6, [10–8]
