= 2011 Morocco Tennis Tour – Meknes =

- Date: February 14–19
- Edition: 4th
- Location: Meknes, Morocco

Champions

Singles
- (Czech Republic) Jaroslav Pospíšil

Doubles
- (Philippines) Treat Conrad Huey / (Italy) Simone Vagnozzi
- Morocco Tennis Tour – Meknes

The 2011 Morocco Tennis Tour – Meknes was a professional tennis tournament played on outdoor clay courts. It was part of the 2011 ATP Challenger Tour. It took place in Meknes, Morocco between 14 and 19 February 2011.

== ATP entrants ==
=== Seeds ===
Country	Player	Rank	Seed
GER	Denis Gremelmayr	108	1
GER	Simon Greul	118	2
FRA	Éric Prodon	132	3
CZE	Jaroslav Pospíšil	135	4
ITA	Alessio di Mauro	161	5
GER	Bastian Knittel	167	6
FRA	Augustin Gensse	185	7
ITA	Simone Vagnozzi	186	8

- Rankings are as of February 7, 2011.

=== Other entrants ===
The following players received wildcards into the singles main draw:

- (Morocco) Anas Fattar
- (Morocco) Yassine Idmbarek
- (Morocco) Hicham Khaddari
- (Morocco) Talal Ouahabi

The following players received entry from the qualifying draw:

- (Romania) Victor Crivoi
- (Spain) Gerard Granollers Pujol
- (Brazil) Leonardo Kirche
- (Croatia) Franko Škugor

== Champions ==
=== Singles ===
(Czech Republic) Jaroslav Pospíšil def. (Spain) Guillermo Olaso, 6–1, 3–6, 6–3

=== Doubles ===
(Philippines) Treat Conrad Huey / (Italy) Simone Vagnozzi def. (Italy) Alessio di Mauro / (Italy) Alessandro Motti, 6–1, 6–2
