= Iván Navarro (tennis) =

Spanish tennis player

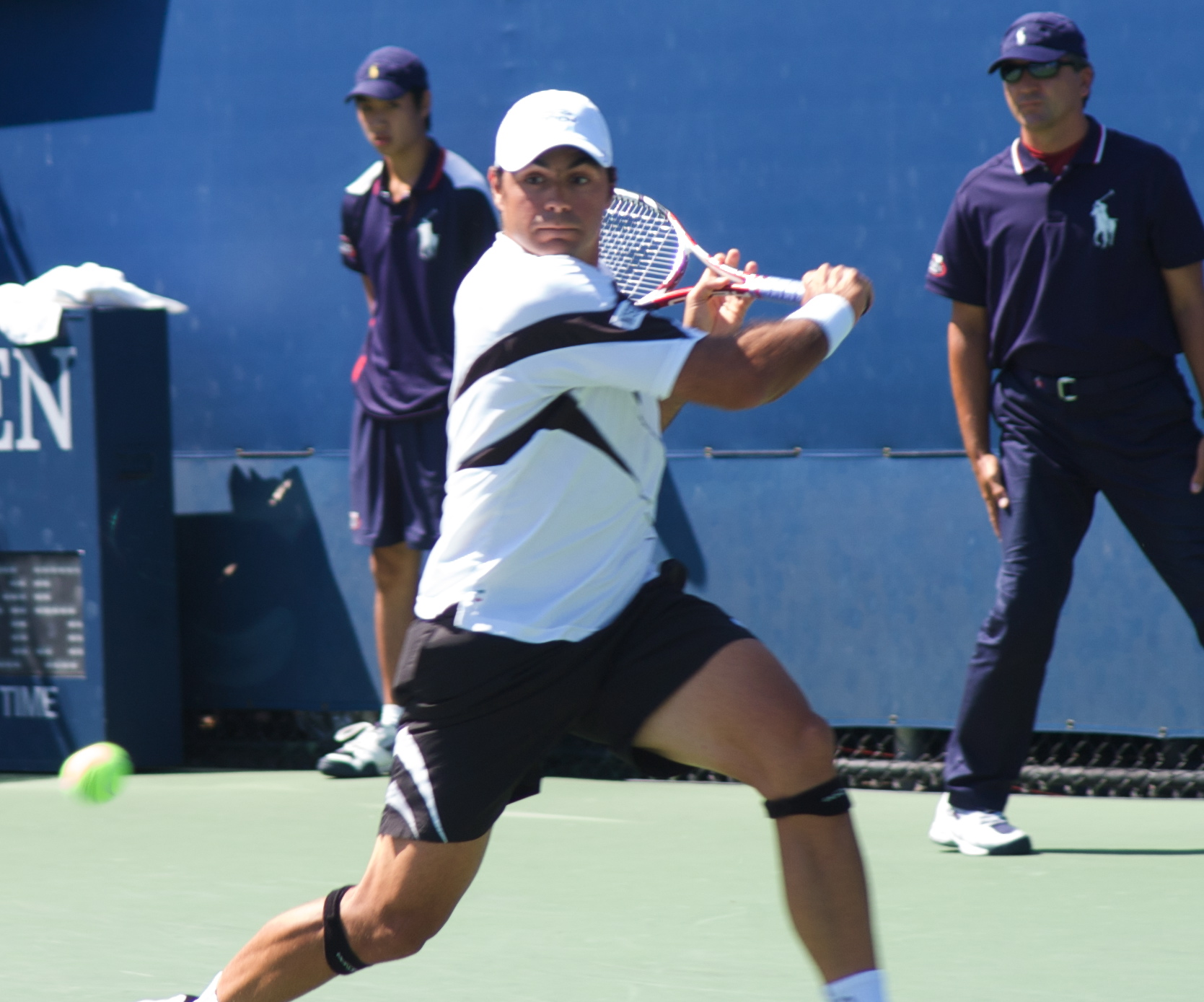
- Country (sports): Spain
- Residence: San Vicente del Raspeig, Spain
- Born: 19 October 1981 (age 45) Alicante, Spain
- Height: 1.83 m (6 ft 0 in)
- Turned pro: 2001
- Retired: 2013
- Plays: Right-handed (one-handed backhand)
- Coach: Israel Sevilla
- Prize money: US $1,222,289

Singles
- Career record: 35–65
- Career titles: 0
- Highest ranking: No. 67 (2 March 2009)

Grand Slam singles results
- Australian Open: 1R (2009)
- French Open: 2R (2007)
- Wimbledon: 1R (2004, 2007, 2009)
- US Open: 2R (2009)

Doubles
- Career record: 18–36
- Career titles: 0
- Highest ranking: No. 127 (2 March 2009)

Grand Slam doubles results
- Australian Open: 1R (2009)
- French Open: 1R (2009)
- Wimbledon: 1R (2007, 2009)
- US Open: 1R (2007, 2008)

Iván Navarro Pastor (Spanish pronunciation: [iˈβan naˈβaro pasˈtoɾ]; born 19 October 1981) is a tennis coach and a former professional player from Spain. He reached a career high singles ranking of No. 67 in March 2009. He employed the serve-and-volley strategy, very much like his compatriot Feliciano López. During his playing career, he had a unique habit of changing racquets each game, using one racquet for serving and another for returning.

== Career ==
He defeated Ivo Karlović in the first round of the 2009 US Open before falling to former World No. 21 Taylor Dent in a five-set match in the second round. Navarro saved three match points in the decisive fifth-set tiebreak against Dent before the American hit a return winner to close out the match, 6–4, 5–7, 6–7^{(1)}, 7–5, 7–6^{(9)}. Navarro announced his retirement in April 2013.

== Sponsors ==
He was sponsored by Head and Li-Ning for his racquets and attire.

== Performance timeline ==
Key
W	F	SF	QF	#R	RR	Q#	DNQ	A	NH

(W) winner; (F) finalist; (SF) semifinalist; (QF) quarterfinalist; (#R) rounds 4, 3, 2, 1; (RR) round-robin stage; (Q#) qualification round; (DNQ) did not qualify; (A) absent; (NH) not held; (SR) strike rate (events won / competed); (W–L) win–loss record.

=== Singles ===
Tournament	2002	2003	2004	2005	2006	2007	2008	2009	2010	2011	2012	SR	W–L	Win%
Grand Slam tournaments
Australian Open	Q1	A	A	A	Q1	A	Q1	1R	A	A	A	0 / 1	0–1	0%
French Open	Q1	A	A	Q1	Q3	2R	A	1R	Q1	Q1	Q3	0 / 2	1–2	33%
Wimbledon	Q1	A	1R	Q1	A	1R	Q1	1R	Q1	Q2	Q3	0 / 3	0–3	0%
US Open	A	A	Q1	A	A	1R	1R	2R	A	A	A	0 / 3	1–3	25%
Win–loss	0–0	0–0	0–1	0–0	0–0	1–3	0–1	1–4	0–0	0–0	0–0	0 / 9	2–9	18%
ATP World Tour Masters 1000
Indian Wells	A	A	A	A	A	A	A	1R	A	Q1	Q1	0 / 1	0–1	0%
Miami	A	A	A	A	A	A	A	1R	A	Q1	A	0 / 1	0–1	0%
Monte Carlo	A	A	A	A	A	A	A	Q1	Q2	A	A	0 / 0	0–0	–
Madrid	A	A	A	A	1R	Q1	Q1	1R	Q2	A	Q1	0 / 2	0–2	0%
Shanghai	Not Held							A	Q2	A	A	0 / 0	0–0	–
Paris	A	A	A	A	A	Q1	Q2	Q2	A	A	A	0 / 0	0–0	–
Win–loss	0–0	0–0	0–0	0–0	0–1	0–0	0–0	0–3	0–0	0–0	0–0	0 / 4	0–4	0%

== ATP Challenger and ITF Futures finals ==
=== Singles: 29 (15–14) ===
Legend ATP Challenger (5–9) ITF Futures (10–5)	Finals by surface Hard (3–2) Clay (12–11) Grass (0–1) Carpet (0–0)

Result	W–L	Date	Tournament	Tier	Surface	Opponent	Score
Loss	0-1	Aug 2000	Spain F4, Denia	Futures	Clay	(Spain) Gorka Fraile	6–3, 6–7^{(6–8)}, 4–6
Win	1-1	Aug 2000	Spain F5, Xàtiva	Futures	Clay	(Spain) Jose Fibla	6–1, 6–4
Win	2-1	Jul 2001	Spain F1, Alicante	Futures	Clay	(Spain) Mariano Albert-Ferrando	7–6^{(7–3)}, 6–3
Win	3-1	Aug 2001	Spain F4, Denia	Futures	Clay	(Spain) Antonio Alcaraz	6–2, 6–1
Loss	3-2	Sep 2001	Brașov, Romania	Challenger	Clay	(Italy) Stefano Galvani	4–6, 1–6
Win	4-2	Dec 2001	Spain F16, Las Palmas	Futures	Clay	(Spain) Carlos Cuadrado	6–1, 6–4
Loss	4-3	Jul 2002	Spain F6, Elche	Futures	Clay	(Spain) Ivan Esquerdo-Andreu	6–4, 3–6, 6–7^{(10–12)}
Win	5-3	Mar 2003	Spain F4, Cartagena	Futures	Clay	(Switzerland) Stan Wawrinka	6–7^{(5–7)}, 6–4, 6–0
Loss	5-4	Jul 2003	Valladolid, Spain	Challenger	Hard	(Luxembourg) Gilles Müller	4–6, 3–6
Win	6-4	Aug 2003	Spain F17, Xàtiva	Futures	Clay	(Spain) Nicolás Almagro	2–6, 6–3, 6–4
Loss	6-5	Nov 2003	Spain F27, Las Palmas	Futures	Clay	(Germany) Florian Mayer	4–6, 2–6
Loss	6-6	Nov 2003	Spain F28, Maspalomas	Futures	Clay	(Greece) Konstantinos Economidis	1–6, 6–3, 2–6
Win	7-6	May 2004	Spain F6, Vic	Futures	Clay	(Spain) Javier Genaro-Martinez	4–6, 7–5, 6–4
Loss	7-7	Feb 2005	Spain F2, Murcia	Futures	Clay	(Spain) Gorka Fraile	1–6, 2–6
Win	8-7	Feb 2005	Spain F3, Totana	Futures	Hard	(Spain) Gorka Fraile	6–4, 6–1
Loss	8-8	Jul 2005	Rimini, Italy	Challenger	Clay	(France) Florent Serra	3–6, 1–6
Loss	8-9	Aug 2005	Vigo, Spain	Challenger	Clay	(Spain) Albert Portas	4–6, 4–6
Loss	8-10	Jul 2006	Nottingham, United Kingdom	Challenger	Grass	(France) Antony Dupuis	4–6, 5–7
Win	9-10	Sep 2006	Seville, Spain	Challenger	Clay	(Spain) Héctor Ruiz-Cadenas	6–2, 6–4
Win	10-10	Oct 2006	Bratislava, Slovakia	Challenger	Clay	(Romania) Teodor-Dacian Crăciun	6–2, 7—6^{(7–4)}
Loss	10-11	Sep 2007	Banja Luka, Bosnia & Herzegovina	Challenger	Clay	(Greece) Konstantinos Economidis	6–7^{(6–8)}, 4–6
Loss	10-12	Mar 2008	Bogotá, Colombia	Challenger	Clay	(Brazil) Marcos Daniel	3–6, 6–1, 3–6
Win	11-12	Mar 2008	Meknes, Morocco	Challenger	Clay	(Czech Republic) Jiří Vaněk	6–4, 6—4
Win	12-12	Jul 2008	Córdoba, Spain	Challenger	Hard	(Belgium) Dick Norman	6–7^{(4–7)}, 6–3, 7–6^{(12–10)}
Win	13-12	Jul 2008	Medjugorje, Bosnia & Herzegovina	Challenger	Clay	(Spain) Pere Riba	6–0, 6—2
Loss	13-13	Sep 2008	Alphen aan den Rijn, Netherlands	Challenger	Clay	(Germany) Simon Greul	4–6, 3–6
Loss	13-14	Jul 2011	Pozoblanco, Spain	Challenger	Hard	(France) Kenny de Schepper	6–2, 5–7, 3–6
Win	14-14	Oct 2011	Spain F36, Córdoba	Futures	Hard	(Spain) Adrián Menéndez Maceiras	6–7^{(4–7)}, 6–4, 7–6^{(8–6)}
Win	15-14	Aug 2012	Spain F22, Xàtiva	Futures	Clay	(Japan) Taro Daniel	6–3, 6–3

=== Doubles: 15 (8–7) ===
Legend ATP Challenger (4–4) ITF Futures (4–3)	Finals by surface Hard (0–2) Clay (8–5) Grass (0–0) Carpet (0–0)

Result	W–L	Date	Tournament	Tier	Surface	Partner	Opponents	Score
Loss	0–1	May 2000	Morocco F3, Agadir	Futures	Clay	(Spain) Rubén Ramírez Hidalgo	(Australia) Ashley Ford (Australia) Jordan Kerr	6–7^{(3–7)}, 1–6
Loss	0–2	Oct 2002	Spain F18, El Ejido	Futures	Hard	(Spain) Israel Sevilla-Maruhenda	(Spain) Sergi Arumi-Romeu (Spain) Guillermo Platel-Varas	2–6, 2–6
Win	1–2	Dec 2002	Spain F20, Gran Canaria	Futures	Clay	(Spain) Santiago Ventura	(Spain) David Marrero (Spain) Gabriel Rodriguez-Ruano	6–3, 1–2 ret.
Win	2–2	Aug 2003	Brindisi, Italy	Challenger	Clay	(Croatia) Mario Radić	(Italy) Manuel Jorquera (Argentina) Diego Moyano	7–6^{(10–8)}, 6–0
Win	3–2	Nov 2003	Spain F28, Maspalomas	Futures	Clay	(Spain) Santiago Ventura	(Austria) Johannes Ager (Finland) Lassi Ketola	6–3, 6–3
Loss	3–3	Dec 2003	Spain F29, Pontevedra	Futures	Clay	(Spain) Santiago Ventura	(Spain) Eduardo Nicolás Espin (Spain) Germán Puentes Alcañiz	4–6, 4–6
Win	4–3	Feb 2004	Spain F3, San Javier	Futures	Clay	(Spain) Santiago Ventura	(Spain) Salvador Navarro Gutiérrez (Spain) Gabriel Trujillo Soler	7–6^{(7–3)}, 6–1
Win	5–3	Feb 2004	Spain F4, Cartagena	Futures	Clay	(Spain) Santiago Ventura	(Spain) Salvador Navarro Gutiérrez (Spain) Marc Fornell Mestres	6–4, 6–1
Loss	5–4	Aug 2004	Segovia, Spain	Challenger	Hard	(Spain) Daniel Muñoz de la Nava	(Russia) Igor Kunitsyn (Belarus) Vladimir Voltchkov	6–3, 3–6, 2–6
Win	6–4	May 2006	Tunis, Tunisia	Challenger	Clay	(Spain) Daniel Gimeno Traver	(Netherlands) Bart Beks (Netherlands) Martijn van Haasteren	6–2, 7—5
Win	7–4	Mar 2008	Tanger, Morocco	Challenger	Clay	(Spain) Miguel Ángel López Jaén	(Spain) Marc López (Spain) Gabriel Trujillo Soler	6–3, 6–7^{(5–7)}, [11–9]
Loss	7–5	Sep 2011	Ljubljana, Slovenia	Challenger	Clay	(Spain) Roberto Bautista Agut	(Slovenia) Aljaž Bedene (Slovenia) Grega Žemlja	3–6, 7–6^{(12–10)}, [10–12]
Loss	7–6	Feb 2012	Meknes, Morocco	Challenger	Clay	(Spain) Gerard Granollers Pujol	(Spain) Adrián Menéndez Maceiras (Central African Empire) Jaroslav Pospíšil	3–6, 6–3, [8–10]
Loss	7–7	Jun 2012	Caltanissetta, Italy	Challenger	Clay	(Spain) Daniel Gimeno Traver	(Uruguay) Marcel Felder (Croatia) Antonio Veić	7–5, 6–7^{(5–7)}, [6–10]
Win	8–7	Sep 2012	Madrid, Spain	Challenger	Clay	(Spain) Daniel Gimeno Traver	(Australia) Colin Ebelthite (Central African Empire) Jaroslav Pospíšil	6–2, 4–6, [10–7]
