= Gianluca Naso =

Italian tennis player

- Country (sports): Italy
- Residence: Trapani, Italy
- Born: 6 January 1987 (age 38) Trapani, Italy
- Height: 1.93 m (6 ft 4 in)
- Retired: 2016
- Plays: Right-handed (two-handed backhand)
- Prize money: $402,534

Singles
- Career record: 3–11
- Career titles: 0
- Highest ranking: No. 175 (16 July 2012)

Grand Slam singles results
- Australian Open: Q3 (2009)
- French Open: Q2 (2012)
- Wimbledon: Q2 (2013)
- US Open: Q3 (2008)

Doubles
- Career record: 2–3
- Career titles: 0
- Highest ranking: No. 189 (22 October 2012)
- Last updated on: 23 October 2017.

Gianluca Naso
Medal record

Representing Italy

Men's Tennis

Mediterranean Games
Bronze medal – third place	2009 Pescara	Singles
Gold medal – first place	2009 Pescara	Men's Doubles

Gianluca Naso (born 6 January 1987) is an Italian retired professional tennis player. He won three doubles titles on ATP Challenger Tour in Genoa and Todi (both in 2008). Both times his partner was Walter Trusendi. And in 2013 at Meknes with Alessandro Giannessi.

== Challenger finals ==
=== Singles: 3 (1–2) ===
Legend
ATP Challenger Tour (1–2)

Outcome	No.	Date	Tournament	Surface	Opponent	Score
Runner-up	1.	9 September 2007	Genoa, Italy	Clay	(Italy) Flavio Cipolla	2–6, 7–6^{(7–4)}, 5–7
Runner-up	2.	7 September 2008	Genoa, Italy	Clay	(Italy) Fabio Fognini	4–6, 3–6
Winner	1.	15 July 2012	San Benedetto, Italy	Clay	(Austria) Andreas Haider-Maurer	6–4, 7–5

=== Doubles: 8 (3–5) ===
Legend
ATP Challenger Tour (3–5)

Outcome	No.	Date	Tournament	Surface	Partner	Opponents	Score
Runner-up	1.	5 February 2006	Florianópolis, Brazil	Clay	(United States) Mirko Pehar	(Argentina) Juan Pablo Brzezicki (Argentina) Cristian Villagrán	6–7^{(3–7)}, 2–6
Winner	1.	7 September 2008	Genoa, Italy	Clay	(Italy) Walter Trusendi	(Italy) Stefano Galvani (San Marino) Domenico Vicini	6–2, 7–6^{(7–2)}
Winner	2.	21 September 2008	Todi, Italy	Clay	(Italy) Walter Trusendi	(Italy) Alberto Brizzi (Italy) Alessandro Motti	4–6, 7–6^{(7–3)}, [10–4]
Runner-up	2.	28 June 2009	Reggio Emilia, Italy	Clay	(Italy) Walter Trusendi	(Spain) Miguel Ángel López Jaén (Spain) Pere Riba	4–6, 4–6
Runner-up	3.	15 July 2012	San Benedetto, Italy	Clay	(Italy) Stefano Ianni	(Australia) Brydan Klein (Australia) Dane Propoggia	6–3, 4–6, [10–12]
Runner-up	4.	7 July 2013	Todi, Italy	Clay	(Italy) Andrea Arnaboldi	(Colombia) Santiago Giraldo (Colombia) Cristian Rodríguez	6–4, 6–7^{(2–7)}, [3–10]
Winner	3.	14 September 2013	Meknes, Morocco	Clay	(Italy) Alessandro Giannessi	(Spain) Gerard Granollers (Spain) Jordi Samper-Montaña	7–5, 7–6^{(7–3)}
Runner-up	5.	12 September 2015	Meknes, Morocco	Clay	(Italy) Riccardo Sinicropi	(Germany) Kevin Krawietz (Germany) Maximilian Marterer	5–7, 1–6
