= Yannik Reuter =

Belgian tennis player

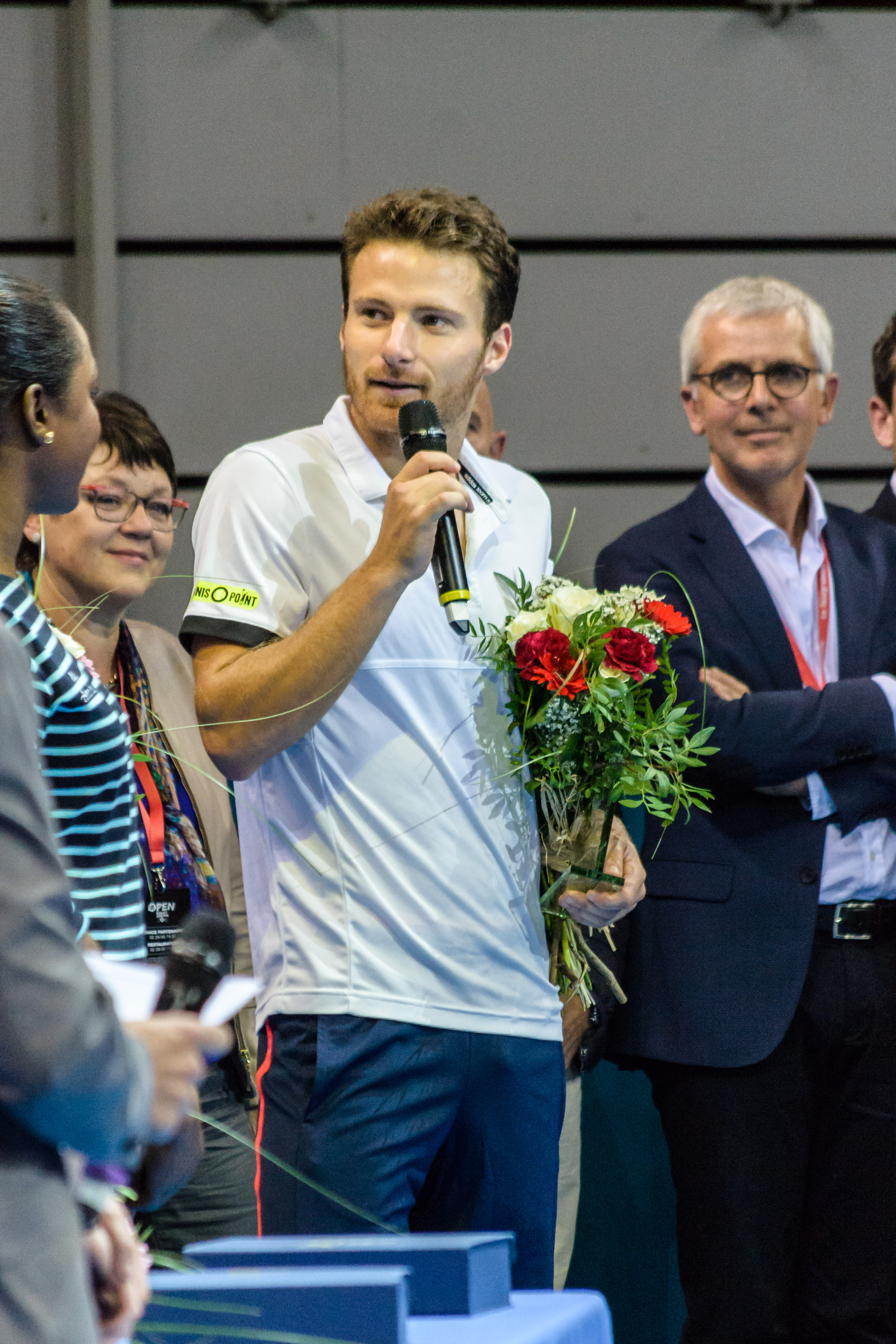
- Country (sports): Belgium
- Born: 6 March 1991 (age 34)
- Plays: Right-handed
- Prize money: $172,545

Singles
- Highest ranking: No. 195 (31 Oct 2016)

Grand Slam singles results
- Australian Open: Q2 (2017)
- French Open: Q1 (2017)
- Wimbledon: Q1 (2017)
- US Open: Q2 (2016)

Doubles
- Highest ranking: No. 457 (30 Nov 2015)

Yannik Reuter (born 6 March 1991) is a Belgian former professional tennis player. He was active on tour from 2008 to 2018 and reached a best singles world ranking of 195.

== Biography ==
A Sankt Vith-native, Reuter is a member of Belgium's German speaking community.

Reuter competed in his first professional tournament in 2008 and won eight singles titles on the ITF Futures circuit during his career. He made two ATP Challenger finals, the first in Meknes in 2013. After making his grand slam qualifying debut at the 2016 US Open, he broke into the world's top 200 two months later by making the final of the Brest Challenger. En route to the final in Brest he upset world number 73 and top seed Jérémy Chardy, but finished runner-up to Norbert Gombos. In 2017 he was beaten by Frances Tiafoe in the second qualifying round of the Australian Open and also appeared in qualifiers for the French Open and Wimbledon that year.

Following his retirement from the international tour in 2018, Reuter began studying at the University of Düsseldorf and as of 2022 is living in Cologne, Germany. He has competed in the local Bundesliga competition.

== ATP Challenger/ITF Futures finals ==
=== Singles: 20 (8–12) ===
Legend
ATP Challenger (0–2)
ITF Futures (8–10)

Result	W–L	Date	Tournament	Tier	Surface	Opponent	Score
Loss	0–1	Feb 2011	Turkey F6, Antalya	Futures	Hard	(Germany) Cedrik-Marcel Stebe	1–6, 0–6
Loss	0–2	Apr 2011	Turkey F6, Antalya	Futures	Hard	(Moldova) Radu Albot	3–6, 6–7^{1}
Loss	0–3	Jul 2011	Belgium F2, Havré	Futures	Clay	(France) Nicolas Devilder	5–7, 3–6
Win	1–3	Aug 2011	Belgium F7, Eupen	Futures	Clay	(Belgium) Alexandre Folie	6–4, 4–6, 6–0
Loss	1–4	Jun 2012	Morocco F2, Rabat	Futures	Clay	(Algeria) Lamine Ouahab	2–6, 3–6
Win	2–4	Jul 2012	Belgium F2, Havré	Futures	Clay	(Chile) Juan Carlos Sáez	5–7, 7–6^{8}, 7–6^{1}
Win	3–4	Aug 2012	Belgium F6, Ostend	Futures	Clay	(Belgium) Kimmer Coppejans	6–3, 6–1
Loss	3–5	Nov 2012	Turkey F44, Antalya	Futures	Hard	(Turkey) Marsel İlhan	3–6, 2–6
Win	4–5	Feb 2013	Turkey F7, Antalya	Futures	Hard	(Moldova) Radu Albot	7–6^{4}, 3–6, 6–2
Win	5–5	Jul 2013	France F12, Bourg-en-Bresse	Futures	Clay	(Belgium) Germain Gigounon	6–4, 6–0
Loss	5–6	Jul 2013	Belgium F5, Middelkerke	Futures	Hard	(Belgium) Kimmer Coppejans	2–6, 2–6
Loss	0–1	Sep 2013	Meknes Challenger, Morocco	Challenger	Clay	(Germany) Cedrik-Marcel Stebe	1–6, 6–4, 2–6
Win	6–6	May 2014	Spain F10, Vic	Futures	Clay	(United States) Noah Rubin	3–6, 6–4, 6–2
Loss	6–7	Jul 2014	France F14, Bourg-en-Bresse	Futures	Clay	(Serbia) Boris Pašanski	6–4, 4–6, 3–6
Loss	6–8	Feb 2015	Tunisia F6, El Kantaoui	Futures	Hard	(Italy) Erik Crepaldi	6–4, 6–7^{4}, 0–6
Loss	6–9	Jun 2015	Netherlands F2, Breda	Futures	Clay	(Netherlands) Scott Griekspoor	4–6, 1–6
Win	7–9	Nov 2015	Turkey F43, Antalya	Futures	Hard	(Turkey) Cem İlkel	5–7, 7–6^{9}, 7–6^{2}
Win	8–9	Jan 2016	France F1, Bagnoles-de-l'Orne	Futures	Clay	(France) Constant Lestienne	6–3, 6–2
Loss	0–2	Oct 2016	Brest Challenger, France	Challenger	Hard	(Slovakia) Norbert Gombos	5–7, 2–6
Loss	8–10	Nov 2016	Germany F17, Leimen	Futures	Hard	(Switzerland) Yann Marti	4–6, 2–6
