= Hicham Khaddari =

Moroccan tennis player

- Country (sports): Morocco
- Born: 19 August 1991 (age 33); Casablanca, Morocco
- Plays: Right-handed
- Prize money: $30,318

Singles
- Career record: 4–4 (ATP Tour & Davis Cup)
- Highest ranking: No. 492 (18 Nov 2013)

Doubles
- Career record: 1–0 (Davis Cup)
- Highest ranking: No. 873 (30 Sep 2013)

Hicham Khaddari (born 19 August 1991) is a Moroccan former professional tennis player.

Khaddari played for Morocco's Davis Cup team from 2011 to 2014, appearing in a total of six ties, for four singles and one doubles win. His only Futures title win was as a qualifier in Sharm El Sheikh in 2013 and he made his ATP Tour main draw debut came at the 2014 Grand Prix Hassan II in Casablanca, the city of his birth. He fell in the first round of the Grand Prix Hassan to a former finalist Victor Hănescu in two sets, losing the first in a tiebreak.

== ITF Futures titles ==
=== Singles: (1) ===
No.	Date	Tournament	Surface	Opponent	Score
1.	May 2013	Egypt F5, Sharm El Sheikh	Clay	(Austria) Nicolas Reissig	6–3, 6–3

== See also ==
- List of Morocco Davis Cup team representatives
