= Morocco Tennis Tour – Meknes =

Defunct tennis tournament
- Event name: Morocco Tennis Tour – Meknes
- Founded: 2008
- Abolished: 2016
- Editions: 9
- Location: Meknes, Morocco
- Category: ATP Challenger Tour
- Surface: Red clay
- Draw: 32S/29Q/16D
- Website: Official Website

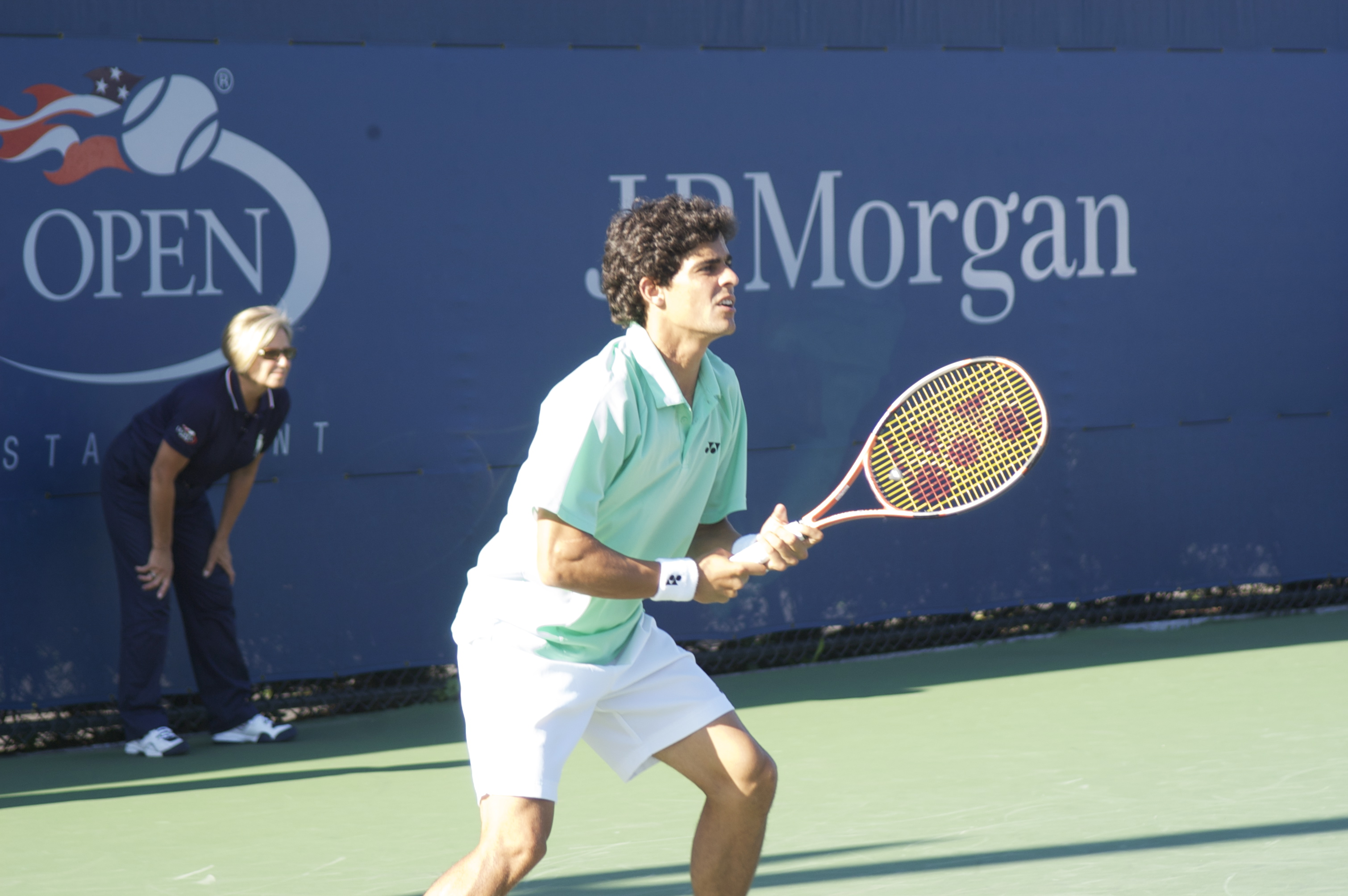
Rui Machado from Portugal won his first ATP Challenger Tour title in Meknes against David Marrero.

The Morocco Tennis Tour – Meknes was a professional tennis tournament played on outdoor red clay courts. It was part of the ATP Challenger Tour. It was held annually in Meknes, Morocco, from 2008 until 2016.

== Past finals ==
=== Singles ===
Year	Champion	Runner-up	Score
2016	(Germany) Maximilian Marterer	(Belarus) Uladzimir Ignatik	7–6^{(7–4)}, 6–3
2015	(Spain) Daniel Muñoz de la Nava	(Spain) Roberto Carballés Baena	6–4, 6–2
2014	(Belgium) Kimmer Coppejans	(France) Lucas Pouille	4–6, 6–2, 6–2
2013	(Germany) Cedrik-Marcel Stebe	(Belgium) Yannik Reuter	6–1, 4–6, 6–2
2012	(Russia) Evgeny Donskoy	(Romania) Adrian Ungur	6–1, 6–3
2011	(Czech Republic) Jaroslav Pospíšil	(Spain) Guillermo Olaso	6–1, 3–6, 6–3
2010	(Ukraine) Oleksandr Dolgopolov Jr.	(Portugal) Rui Machado	7–5, 6–2
2009	(Portugal) Rui Machado	(Spain) David Marrero	6–2, 6–7(6), 6–3
2008	(Spain) Iván Navarro	(Czech Republic) Jiří Vaněk	6–4, 6–4

=== Doubles ===
Year	Champions	Runners-up	Score
2016	(Switzerland) Luca Margaroli (Egypt) Mohamed Safwat	(Spain) Pedro Martínez (Spain) Oriol Roca Batalla	6–4, 6–4
2015	(Germany) Kevin Krawietz (Germany) Maximilian Marterer	(Italy) Gianluca Naso (Italy) Riccardo Sinicropi	7–5, 6–1
2014	(Chile) Hans Podlipnik Castillo (Italy) Stefano Travaglia	(Spain) Gerard Granollers (Spain) Jordi Samper Montaña	6–2, 6–7^{(4–7)}, [10–7]
2013	(Italy) Alessandro Giannessi (Italy) Gianluca Naso	(Spain) Gerard Granollers (Spain) Jordi Samper Montaña	7–5, 7–6^{(7–3)}
2012	(Spain) Adrián Menéndez (Czech Republic) Jaroslav Pospíšil	(Spain) Gerard Granollers (Spain) Iván Navarro	6–3, 3–6, [10–8]
2011	(Philippines) Treat Conrad Huey (Italy) Simone Vagnozzi	(Italy) Alessio di Mauro (Italy) Alessandro Motti	6–1, 6–2
2010	(Spain) Pablo Andújar (Italy) Flavio Cipolla	(Ukraine) Oleksandr Dolgopolov Jr. (Ukraine) Artem Smirnov	6–2, 6–2
2009	(Spain) Marc López (Algeria) Lamine Ouahab	(Italy) Alessio di Mauro (Italy) Giancarlo Petrazzuolo	6–3, 7–5
2008	(Spain) Alberto Martín (Spain) Daniel Muñoz de la Nava	(Russia) Mikhail Elgin (Russia) Yuri Schukin	6–4, 6–7(2), 10–6
