= Yassine Idmbarek =

Moroccan tennis player

- Country (sports): Morocco
- Born: 7 December 1986 (age 38)
- Prize money: $64,427

Singles
- Career record: 5–6 (at ATP Tour level, Grand Slam level, and in Davis Cup)
- Career titles: 0
- Highest ranking: No. 659 (18 January 2016)
- Current ranking: No. 1243 (31 July 2017)

Doubles
- Career record: 0–5 (at ATP Tour level, Grand Slam level, and in Davis Cup)
- Career titles: 0
- Highest ranking: No. 641 (19 October 2009)
- Last updated on: 4 August 2017.

Yassine Idmbarek (born 7 December 1986) is a Moroccan tennis player.

Idmbarek has a career high ATP singles ranking of 659 achieved on 18 January 2016. He also has a career high ATP doubles ranking of 641 achieved on 19 October 2009.

Idmbarek made his ATP main draw debut at the 2012 Grand Prix Hassan II in the singles draw. Idmbarek represents Morocco in the Davis Cup.
