= 2013 ATP Challenger Tour =

Details
- Duration: 31 December 2012 – 24 November 2013
- Edition: 36th (5th under this name)
- Tournaments: 149

Achievements (singles)

The ATP Challenger Tour is the secondary professional tennis circuit organized by the Association of Tennis Professionals (ATP). The 2013 ATP Challenger Tour calendar comprised 149 tournaments, with prize money ranging from $35,000 up to $220,000.

== Schedule ==
=== January ===
Week of	Tournament	Champions	Runners-up	Semifinalists	Quarterfinalists
31 December	Aberto de São Paulo; São Paulo, Brazil; Regular series $125,000+H – hard – 32S/32Q/16D; Singles – Doubles	(Argentina) Horacio Zeballos; 7–6^{(7–5)}, 6–2	(Brazil) Rogério Dutra da Silva	(Portugal) Gastão Elias (Brazil) João Souza	(Argentina) Guido Andreozzi (Brazil) Thiago Alves (Ecuador) Julio César Campozano (Argentina) Martín Alund
31 December	Aberto de São Paulo; São Paulo, Brazil; Regular series $125,000+H – hard – 32S/32Q/16D; Singles – Doubles	(United States) James Cerretani (Canada) Adil Shamasdin; 6–7^{(5–7)}, 6–1, [11–9]	(Argentina) Federico Delbonis (Argentina) Renzo Olivo	(Portugal) Gastão Elias (Brazil) João Souza	(Argentina) Guido Andreozzi (Brazil) Thiago Alves (Ecuador) Julio César Campozano (Argentina) Martín Alund
31 December	Internationaux de Nouvelle-Calédonie; Nouméa, New Caledonia, France; Regular series $75,000+H – hard – 32S/10Q/16D; Singles – Doubles	(France) Adrian Mannarino; 6–4, 6–3	(Slovakia) Andrej Martin	(France) Jonathan Dasnières de Veigy (France) Marc Gicquel	(France) Maxime Teixeira (Australia) Samuel Groth (Italy) Alessandro Giannessi (Ukraine) Denys Molchanov
31 December	Internationaux de Nouvelle-Calédonie; Nouméa, New Caledonia, France; Regular series $75,000+H – hard – 32S/10Q/16D; Singles – Doubles	(Australia) Samuel Groth (Japan) Toshihide Matsui; 7–6^{(8–6)}, 1–6, [10–4]	(New Zealand) Artem Sitak (New Zealand) Jose Statham	(France) Jonathan Dasnières de Veigy (France) Marc Gicquel	(France) Maxime Teixeira (Australia) Samuel Groth (Italy) Alessandro Giannessi (Ukraine) Denys Molchanov
7 January	No tournaments scheduled.				
14 January	No tournaments scheduled.				
21 January	Intersport Heilbronn Open; Heilbronn, Germany; Regular series €85,000+H – hard (indoor) – 32S/32Q/16D; Singles – Doubles	(Germany) Michael Berrer; 7–5, 6–3	(Germany) Jan-Lennard Struff	(France) Paul-Henri Mathieu (Belgium) Olivier Rochus	(Canada) Frank Dancevic (Belgium) Ruben Bemelmans (Romania) Marius Copil (Germany) Benjamin Becker
21 January	Intersport Heilbronn Open; Heilbronn, Germany; Regular series €85,000+H – hard (indoor) – 32S/32Q/16D; Singles – Doubles	(Sweden) Johan Brunström (South Africa) Raven Klaasen; 6–3, 0–6, [12–10]	(Australia) Jordan Kerr (Sweden) Andreas Siljeström	(France) Paul-Henri Mathieu (Belgium) Olivier Rochus	(Canada) Frank Dancevic (Belgium) Ruben Bemelmans (Romania) Marius Copil (Germany) Benjamin Becker
21 January	Maui Challenger; Maui, United States; Regular series $50,000 – hard – 32S/12Q/16D; Singles – Doubles	(Japan) Go Soeda; 7–5, 7–5	(Germany) Mischa Zverev	(United States) Tim Smyczek (United States) Michael Russell	(United States) Bradley Klahn (United States) Steve Johnson (United States) Denis Kudla (Russia) Alex Bogomolov Jr.
21 January	Maui Challenger; Maui, United States; Regular series $50,000 – hard – 32S/12Q/16D; Singles – Doubles	(Chinese Taipei) Lee Hsin-han (Chinese Taipei) Peng Hsien-yin; 6–7^{(1–7)}, 6–2, [10–5]	(United States) Tennys Sandgren (United States) Rhyne Williams	(United States) Tim Smyczek (United States) Michael Russell	(United States) Bradley Klahn (United States) Steve Johnson (United States) Denis Kudla (Russia) Alex Bogomolov Jr.
21 January	Seguros Bolívar Open Bucaramanga; Bucaramanga, Colombia; Regular series $35,000+H – clay – 32S/28Q/16D; Singles – Doubles	(Argentina) Federico Delbonis; 7–6^{(7–4)}, 6–3	(United States) Wayne Odesnik	(Colombia) Alejandro González (Chile) Paul Capdeville	(Argentina) Diego Sebastián Schwartzman (Argentina) Martín Alund (Brazil) Marcelo Demoliner (Portugal) Pedro Sousa
21 January	Seguros Bolívar Open Bucaramanga; Bucaramanga, Colombia; Regular series $35,000+H – clay – 32S/28Q/16D; Singles – Doubles	(Brazil) Marcelo Demoliner (Croatia) Franko Škugor; 7–6^{(10–8)}, 6–2	(Peru) Sergio Galdós (Argentina) Marco Trungelliti	(Colombia) Alejandro González (Chile) Paul Capdeville	(Argentina) Diego Sebastián Schwartzman (Argentina) Martín Alund (Brazil) Marcelo Demoliner (Portugal) Pedro Sousa
28 January	McDonald's Burnie International; Burnie, Australia; Regular series $50,000 – hard – 32S/18Q/16D; Singles – Doubles	(Australia) John Millman; 6–2, 4–6, 6–0	(France) Stéphane Robert	(New Zealand) Jose Statham (Australia) Matthew Barton	(Australia) Andrew Whittington (Australia) James Lemke (Australia) Adam Feeney (Canada) Peter Polansky
28 January	McDonald's Burnie International; Burnie, Australia; Regular series $50,000 – hard – 32S/18Q/16D; Singles – Doubles	(South Africa) Ruan Roelofse (Australia) John-Patrick Smith; 6–2, 6–2	(Australia) Brydan Klein (Australia) Dane Propoggia	(New Zealand) Jose Statham (Australia) Matthew Barton	(Australia) Andrew Whittington (Australia) James Lemke (Australia) Adam Feeney (Canada) Peter Polansky

=== February ===
Week of	Tournament	Champions	Runners-up	Semifinalists	Quarterfinalists
4 February	Challenger of Dallas; Dallas, United States; Regular series $100,000 – hard (indoor) – 32S/28Q/16D; Singles – Doubles	(United States) Rhyne Williams; 7–5, 6–3	(United States) Robby Ginepri	(Canada) Frank Dancevic (United States) James Blake	(Canada) Jesse Levine (United States) Alex Kuznetsov (Ukraine) Denys Molchanov (United States) Michael Russell
4 February	Challenger of Dallas; Dallas, United States; Regular series $100,000 – hard (indoor) – 32S/28Q/16D; Singles – Doubles	(United States) Alex Kuznetsov (Germany) Mischa Zverev; 6–4, 6–7^{(7–4)}, [10–5]	(United States) Tennys Sandgren (United States) Rhyne Williams	(Canada) Frank Dancevic (United States) James Blake	(Canada) Jesse Levine (United States) Alex Kuznetsov (Ukraine) Denys Molchanov (United States) Michael Russell
4 February	Trofeo Faip–Perrel; Bergamo, Italy; Regular series €42,500+H – hard (indoor) – 32S/32Q/16D; Singles – Doubles	(Poland) Michał Przysiężny; 4–6, 7–6^{(7–5)}, 7–6^{(7–5)}	(Germany) Jan-Lennard Struff	(Italy) Viktor Galović (Germany) Peter Gojowczyk	(Uzbekistan) Farrukh Dustov (Germany) Bastian Knittel (Germany) Andreas Beck (Sweden) Andreas Vinciguerra
4 February	Trofeo Faip–Perrel; Bergamo, Italy; Regular series €42,500+H – hard (indoor) – 32S/32Q/16D; Singles – Doubles	(Slovakia) Karol Beck (Slovakia) Andrej Martin; 6–3, 3–6, [10–8]	(Italy) Claudio Grassi (Israel) Amir Weintraub	(Italy) Viktor Galović (Germany) Peter Gojowczyk	(Uzbekistan) Farrukh Dustov (Germany) Bastian Knittel (Germany) Andreas Beck (Sweden) Andreas Vinciguerra
4 February	Charles Sturt Adelaide International; Adelaide, Australia; Regular series $50,000 – hard – 32S/29Q/16D; Singles – Doubles	(Australia) Matthew Barton; 6–2, 6–3	(United Kingdom) James Ward	(Australia) Nick Kyrgios (Russia) Alexander Lobkov	(Japan) Yūichi Sugita (Australia) Greg Jones (France) Stéphane Robert (Australia) Samuel Groth
4 February	Charles Sturt Adelaide International; Adelaide, Australia; Regular series $50,000 – hard – 32S/29Q/16D; Singles – Doubles	(Australia) Samuel Groth (Australia) Matt Reid; 6–2, 6–4	(Australia) James Duckworth (Australia) Greg Jones	(Australia) Nick Kyrgios (Russia) Alexander Lobkov	(Japan) Yūichi Sugita (Australia) Greg Jones (France) Stéphane Robert (Australia) Samuel Groth
11 February	Open BNP Paribas Banque de Bretagne; Quimper, France; Regular series €42,500+H – hard (indoor) – 32S/32Q/16D; Singles – Doubles	(Romania) Marius Copil; 7–6^{(11–9)}, 6–4	(France) Marc Gicquel	(Belgium) Steve Darcis (Israel) Dudi Sela	(Spain) Roberto Bautista Agut (France) Kenny de Schepper (France) Édouard Roger-Vasselin (Belarus) Uladzimir Ignatik
11 February	Open BNP Paribas Banque de Bretagne; Quimper, France; Regular series €42,500+H – hard (indoor) – 32S/32Q/16D; Singles – Doubles	(Sweden) Johan Brunström (South Africa) Raven Klaasen; 3–6, 6–2, [10–3]	(United Kingdom) Jamie Delgado (United Kingdom) Ken Skupski	(Belgium) Steve Darcis (Israel) Dudi Sela	(Spain) Roberto Bautista Agut (France) Kenny de Schepper (France) Édouard Roger-Vasselin (Belarus) Uladzimir Ignatik
18 February	No tournaments scheduled.				
25 February	Challenger La Manche; Cherbourg, France; Regular series €42,500+H – hard (indoor) – 32S/32Q/16D; Singles – Doubles	(Netherlands) Jesse Huta Galung; 6–1, 6–3	(France) Vincent Millot	(France) Kenny de Schepper (Ukraine) Sergiy Stakhovsky	(China) Wu Di (Hungary) Márton Fucsovics (Czech Republic) Jan Mertl (France) Marc Gicquel
25 February	Challenger La Manche; Cherbourg, France; Regular series €42,500+H – hard (indoor) – 32S/32Q/16D; Singles – Doubles	(Thailand) Sanchai Ratiwatana (Thailand) Sonchat Ratiwatana; 7–5, 6–4	(Germany) Philipp Marx (Romania) Florin Mergea	(France) Kenny de Schepper (Ukraine) Sergiy Stakhovsky	(China) Wu Di (Hungary) Márton Fucsovics (Czech Republic) Jan Mertl (France) Marc Gicquel
25 February	Challenger ATP de Salinas Diario Expreso; Salinas, Ecuador; Regular series $35,000+H – clay – 32S/32Q/16D; Singles – Doubles	(Colombia) Alejandro González; 4–6, 6–3, 7–6^{(9–7)}	(Argentina) Renzo Olivo	(Italy) Stefano Travaglia (Brazil) João Souza	(Chile) Hans Podlipnik (Italy) Gianluca Naso (Ecuador) Julio César Campozano (Slovakia) Jozef Kovalík
25 February	Challenger ATP de Salinas Diario Expreso; Salinas, Ecuador; Regular series $35,000+H – clay – 32S/32Q/16D; Singles – Doubles	(Peru) Sergio Galdós (Argentina) Marco Trungelliti; 6–4, 6–4	(South Africa) Jean Andersen (South Africa) Izak van der Merwe	(Italy) Stefano Travaglia (Brazil) João Souza	(Chile) Hans Podlipnik (Italy) Gianluca Naso (Ecuador) Julio César Campozano (Slovakia) Jozef Kovalík
25 February	Nature's Way Sydney Tennis International; Sydney, Australia; Regular series $50,000 – hard – 32S/32Q/16D; Singles – Doubles	(Australia) Nick Kyrgios; 6–3, 6–2	(Australia) Matt Reid	(Australia) Samuel Groth (France) Stéphane Robert	(Australia) James Duckworth (New Zealand) Artem Sitak (Australia) Greg Jones (Australia) Matthew Barton
25 February	Nature's Way Sydney Tennis International; Sydney, Australia; Regular series $50,000 – hard – 32S/32Q/16D; Singles – Doubles	(Australia) Brydan Klein (Australia) Dane Propoggia; 6–4, 4–6, [11–9]	(Australia) Alex Bolt (Australia) Nick Kyrgios	(Australia) Samuel Groth (France) Stéphane Robert	(Australia) James Duckworth (New Zealand) Artem Sitak (Australia) Greg Jones (Australia) Matthew Barton

=== March ===
Week of	Tournament	Champions	Runners-up	Semifinalists	Quarterfinalists
4 March	All Japan Indoor Tennis Championships; Kyoto, Japan; Regular series $35,000+H – carpet (indoor) – 32S/32Q/16D; Singles – Doubles	(Australia) John Millman; 4–6, 6–4, 7–6 ^{(7–2)}	(Switzerland) Marco Chiudinelli	(Japan) Hiroki Moriya (Australia) Matthew Barton	(Japan) Yūichi Sugita (Germany) Peter Gojowczyk (Germany) Dominik Meffert (Poland) Michał Przysiężny
4 March	All Japan Indoor Tennis Championships; Kyoto, Japan; Regular series $35,000+H – carpet (indoor) – 32S/32Q/16D; Singles – Doubles	(India) Purav Raja (India) Divij Sharan; 6–4, 7–5	(Australia) Chris Guccione (Australia) Matt Reid	(Japan) Hiroki Moriya (Australia) Matthew Barton	(Japan) Yūichi Sugita (Germany) Peter Gojowczyk (Germany) Dominik Meffert (Poland) Michał Przysiężny
4 March	Cachantún Cup; Santiago, Chile; Regular series $35,000+H – clay – 32S/32Q/16D; Singles – Doubles	(Argentina) Facundo Bagnis; 7–6^{(7–2)}, 7–6^{(7–3)}	(Netherlands) Thiemo de Bakker	(Argentina) Marco Trungelliti (Croatia) Antonio Veić	(Argentina) Martín Alund (Colombia) Alejandro González (Argentina) Federico Delbonis (Chile) Gonzalo Lama
4 March	Cachantún Cup; Santiago, Chile; Regular series $35,000+H – clay – 32S/32Q/16D; Singles – Doubles	(Brazil) Marcelo Demoliner (Brazil) João Souza; 7–5, 6–1	(Argentina) Federico Delbonis (Argentina) Diego Junqueira	(Argentina) Marco Trungelliti (Croatia) Antonio Veić	(Argentina) Martín Alund (Colombia) Alejandro González (Argentina) Federico Delbonis (Chile) Gonzalo Lama
11 March	Dallas Tennis Classic; Dallas, United States; Regular series $125,000+H – hard – 32S/32Q/16D; Singles – Doubles	(Austria) Jürgen Melzer; 6–4, 2–6, 6–1	(United States) Denis Kudla	(Germany) Philipp Petzschner (Ukraine) Illya Marchenko	(United States) Bobby Reynolds (Belgium) Olivier Rochus (Uzbekistan) Denis Istomin (Ukraine) Sergiy Stakhovsky
11 March	Dallas Tennis Classic; Dallas, United States; Regular series $125,000+H – hard – 32S/32Q/16D; Singles – Doubles	(Austria) Jürgen Melzer (Germany) Philipp Petzschner; 6–3, 6–1	(United States) Eric Butorac (United Kingdom) Dominic Inglot	(Germany) Philipp Petzschner (Ukraine) Illya Marchenko	(United States) Bobby Reynolds (Belgium) Olivier Rochus (Uzbekistan) Denis Istomin (Ukraine) Sergiy Stakhovsky
11 March	BH Telecom Indoors; Sarajevo, Bosnia and Herzegovina; Regular series €30,000+H – hard (indoor) – 32S/10Q/16D; Singles – Doubles	(France) Adrian Mannarino; 7–6^{(7–3)}, 7–6^{(7–2)}	(Germany) Dustin Brown	(Slovakia) Karol Beck (Croatia) Nikola Mektić	(Bosnia and Herzegovina) Tomislav Brkić (Kazakhstan) Evgeny Korolev (France) Pierre-Hugues Herbert (Czech Republic) Jan Mertl
11 March	BH Telecom Indoors; Sarajevo, Bosnia and Herzegovina; Regular series €30,000+H – hard (indoor) – 32S/10Q/16D; Singles – Doubles	(Bosnia and Herzegovina) Mirza Bašić (Bosnia and Herzegovina) Tomislav Brkić; 6–3, 7–5	(Slovakia) Karol Beck (Slovakia) Igor Zelenay	(Slovakia) Karol Beck (Croatia) Nikola Mektić	(Bosnia and Herzegovina) Tomislav Brkić (Kazakhstan) Evgeny Korolev (France) Pierre-Hugues Herbert (Czech Republic) Jan Mertl
18 March	Challenger Banque Nationale de Rimouski; Rimouski, Canada; Regular series $35,000+H – hard (indoor) – 32S/32Q/16D; Singles – Doubles	(South Africa) Rik de Voest; 7–6^{(8–6)}, 6–4	(Canada) Vasek Pospisil	(Bosnia and Herzegovina) Aldin Šetkić (United States) Bobby Reynolds	(Republic of Ireland) James McGee (Australia) Samuel Groth (Japan) Yūichi Sugita (United Kingdom) Alex Bogdanovic
18 March	Challenger Banque Nationale de Rimouski; Rimouski, Canada; Regular series $35,000+H – hard (indoor) – 32S/32Q/16D; Singles – Doubles	(Australia) Samuel Groth (Australia) John-Patrick Smith; 7–6^{(7–5)}, 7–6^{(9–7)}	(Germany) Philipp Marx (Romania) Florin Mergea	(Bosnia and Herzegovina) Aldin Šetkić (United States) Bobby Reynolds	(Republic of Ireland) James McGee (Australia) Samuel Groth (Japan) Yūichi Sugita (United Kingdom) Alex Bogdanovic
25 March	Orange Open Guadeloupe; Le Gosier, Guadeloupe; Regular series $100,000+H – hard – 32S/32Q/16D; Singles – Doubles	(France) Benoît Paire; 6–4, 5–7, 6–4	(Ukraine) Sergiy Stakhovsky	(Germany) Matthias Bachinger (Czech Republic) Lukáš Rosol	(India) Prakash Amritraj (Slovakia) Lukáš Lacko (Luxembourg) Gilles Müller (Israel) Dudi Sela
25 March	Orange Open Guadeloupe; Le Gosier, Guadeloupe; Regular series $100,000+H – hard – 32S/32Q/16D; Singles – Doubles	(Israel) Dudi Sela (Chinese Taipei) Jimmy Wang; 6–1, 6–2	(Germany) Philipp Marx (Romania) Florin Mergea	(Germany) Matthias Bachinger (Czech Republic) Lukáš Rosol	(India) Prakash Amritraj (Slovakia) Lukáš Lacko (Luxembourg) Gilles Müller (Israel) Dudi Sela
25 March	Seguros Bolívar Open Pereira; Pereira, Colombia; Regular series $50,000+H – clay – 32S/10Q/16D; Singles – Doubles	(Colombia) Santiago Giraldo; 6–2, 6–4	(Chile) Paul Capdeville	(Italy) Paolo Lorenzi (Brazil) João Souza	(Argentina) Facundo Bagnis (Brazil) Fabiano de Paula (Brazil) Rogério Dutra da Silva (Russia) Teymuraz Gabashvili
25 March	Seguros Bolívar Open Pereira; Pereira, Colombia; Regular series $50,000+H – clay – 32S/10Q/16D; Singles – Doubles	(Colombia) Nicolás Barrientos (Colombia) Eduardo Struvay; 3–6, 6–3, [10–6]	(Argentina) Facundo Bagnis (Argentina) Federico Delbonis	(Italy) Paolo Lorenzi (Brazil) João Souza	(Argentina) Facundo Bagnis (Brazil) Fabiano de Paula (Brazil) Rogério Dutra da Silva (Russia) Teymuraz Gabashvili
25 March	San Luis Open Challenger; San Luis Potosí, Mexico; Regular series $35,000+H – clay – 32S/10Q/16D; Singles – Doubles	(Italy) Alessio di Mauro; 4–6, 6–3, 6–2	(United States) Daniel Kosakowski	(Switzerland) Marco Chiudinelli (United States) Tennys Sandgren	(Argentina) Agustín Velotti (Germany) Peter Gojowczyk (France) Maxime Teixeira (France) Grégoire Burquier
25 March	San Luis Open Challenger; San Luis Potosí, Mexico; Regular series $35,000+H – clay – 32S/10Q/16D; Singles – Doubles	(Croatia) Marin Draganja (Spain) Adrián Menéndez Maceiras; 6–4, 6–3	(Switzerland) Marco Chiudinelli (Germany) Peter Gojowczyk	(Switzerland) Marco Chiudinelli (United States) Tennys Sandgren	(Argentina) Agustín Velotti (Germany) Peter Gojowczyk (France) Maxime Teixeira (France) Grégoire Burquier

=== April ===
Week of	Tournament	Champions	Runners-up	Semifinalists	Quarterfinalists
1 April	Open Harmonie mutuelle Saint-Brieuc, France; Regular series €30,000+H – hard (indoor) – 32S/32Q/16D; Singles – Doubles	(Netherlands) Jesse Huta Galung; 7–6^{(7–4)}, 4–6, 7–6^{(7–3)}	(France) Kenny de Schepper	(Austria) Martin Fischer (Czech Republic) Jan Mertl	(Ukraine) Oleksandr Nedovyesov (France) David Guez (France) Stéphane Robert (France) Nicolas Renavand
1 April	Open Harmonie mutuelle Saint-Brieuc, France; Regular series €30,000+H – hard (indoor) – 32S/32Q/16D; Singles – Doubles	(Poland) Tomasz Bednarek (Sweden) Andreas Siljeström; 6–3, 4–6, [10–7]	(Netherlands) Jesse Huta Galung (Russia) Konstantin Kravchuk	(Austria) Martin Fischer (Czech Republic) Jan Mertl	(Ukraine) Oleksandr Nedovyesov (France) David Guez (France) Stéphane Robert (France) Nicolas Renavand
1 April	Torneo Internacional AGT; León, Mexico; Regular series $35,000+H – hard – 32S/10Q/16D; Singles – Doubles	(United States) Donald Young; 6–2, 6–2	(Chinese Taipei) Jimmy Wang	(Israel) Amir Weintraub (Israel) Dudi Sela	(Chinese Taipei) Lu Yen-hsun (Japan) Yūichi Sugita (Russia) Alex Bogomolov Jr. (Australia) John Millman
1 April	Torneo Internacional AGT; León, Mexico; Regular series $35,000+H – hard – 32S/10Q/16D; Singles – Doubles	(Australia) Chris Guccione (Australia) Matt Reid; 6–3, 7–5	(India) Purav Raja (India) Divij Sharan	(Israel) Amir Weintraub (Israel) Dudi Sela	(Chinese Taipei) Lu Yen-hsun (Japan) Yūichi Sugita (Russia) Alex Bogomolov Jr. (Australia) John Millman
8 April	Jalisco Open; Guadalajara, Mexico; Regular series $100,000 – hard – 32S/32Q/16D; Singles – Doubles	(Russia) Alex Bogomolov Jr. 2–6, 6–3, 6–1	(United States) Rajeev Ram	(France) Adrian Mannarino (Canada) Vasek Pospisil	(Chinese Taipei) Lu Yen-hsun (Spain) Adrián Menéndez Maceiras (Spain) Daniel Muñoz de la Nava (Switzerland) Marco Chiudinelli
8 April	Jalisco Open; Guadalajara, Mexico; Regular series $100,000 – hard – 32S/32Q/16D; Singles – Doubles	(Croatia) Marin Draganja (Croatia) Mate Pavić; 5–7, 6–2, [13–11]	(Australia) Samuel Groth (Australia) John-Patrick Smith	(France) Adrian Mannarino (Canada) Vasek Pospisil	(Chinese Taipei) Lu Yen-hsun (Spain) Adrián Menéndez Maceiras (Spain) Daniel Muñoz de la Nava (Switzerland) Marco Chiudinelli
8 April	Seguros Bolívar Open Barranquilla; Barranquilla, Colombia; Regular series $50,000+H – clay – 32S/10Q/16D; Singles – Doubles	(Argentina) Federico Delbonis; 6–3, 6–2	(Argentina) Facundo Bagnis	(Belgium) Arthur De Greef (Portugal) Pedro Sousa	(Argentina) Renzo Olivo (Argentina) Marco Trungelliti (United States) Wayne Odesnik (Colombia) Alejandro González
8 April	Seguros Bolívar Open Barranquilla; Barranquilla, Colombia; Regular series $50,000+H – clay – 32S/10Q/16D; Singles – Doubles	(Argentina) Facundo Bagnis (Argentina) Federico Delbonis; 6–3, 7–5	(Brazil) Fabiano de Paula (Italy) Stefano Ianni	(Belgium) Arthur De Greef (Portugal) Pedro Sousa	(Argentina) Renzo Olivo (Argentina) Marco Trungelliti (United States) Wayne Odesnik (Colombia) Alejandro González
8 April	Mersin Cup; Mersin, Turkey; Regular series €42,500 – clay – 32S/10Q/16D; Singles – Doubles	(Czech Republic) Jiří Veselý; 6–1, 6–1	(Germany) Simon Greul	(Germany) Bastian Knittel (France) Stéphane Robert	(Austria) Michael Linzer (Germany) Julian Reister (Romania) Victor Crivoi (Kazakhstan) Andrey Golubev
8 April	Mersin Cup; Mersin, Turkey; Regular series €42,500 – clay – 32S/10Q/16D; Singles – Doubles	(Germany) Andreas Beck (Germany) Dominik Meffert; 5–7, 6–3, [10–8]	(Moldova) Radu Albot (Ukraine) Oleksandr Nedovyesov	(Germany) Bastian Knittel (France) Stéphane Robert	(Austria) Michael Linzer (Germany) Julian Reister (Romania) Victor Crivoi (Kazakhstan) Andrey Golubev
8 April	Taroii Open de Tênis; Itajaí, Brazil; Regular series $35,000+H – clay – 32S/10Q/16D; Singles – Doubles	(Brazil) Rogério Dutra da Silva; 4–6, 6–3, 6–1	(Slovakia) Jozef Kovalík	(Portugal) Gastão Elias (Canada) Steven Diez	(Argentina) Guido Andreozzi (Spain) Marc Giner (France) Axel Michon (Croatia) Nikola Mektić
8 April	Taroii Open de Tênis; Itajaí, Brazil; Regular series $35,000+H – clay – 32S/10Q/16D; Singles – Doubles	(Australia) James Duckworth (France) Pierre-Hugues Herbert; 7–5, 6–2	(Brazil) Guilherme Clezar (Brazil) Fabrício Neis	(Portugal) Gastão Elias (Canada) Steven Diez	(Argentina) Guido Andreozzi (Spain) Marc Giner (France) Axel Michon (Croatia) Nikola Mektić
15 April	Sarasota Open; Sarasota, United States; Regular series $100,000 – clay (green) – 32S/32Q/16D; Singles – Doubles	(United States) Alex Kuznetsov; 6–0, 6–2	(United States) Wayne Odesnik	(India) Somdev Devvarman (Ukraine) Denys Molchanov	(Germany) Mischa Zverev (United States) Steve Johnson (Argentina) Guido Pella (Argentina) Facundo Argüello
15 April	Sarasota Open; Sarasota, United States; Regular series $100,000 – clay (green) – 32S/32Q/16D; Singles – Doubles	(Serbia) Ilija Bozoljac (India) Somdev Devvarman; 6–7^{(5–7)}, 7–6^{(7–3)}, [11–9]	(United States) Steve Johnson (United States) Bradley Klahn	(India) Somdev Devvarman (Ukraine) Denys Molchanov	(Germany) Mischa Zverev (United States) Steve Johnson (Argentina) Guido Pella (Argentina) Facundo Argüello
15 April	Copa Internacional de Tenis Total Digest; Mexico City, Mexico; Regular series $35,000+H – hard – 32S/10Q/16D; Singles – Doubles	(Slovakia) Andrej Martin; 4–6, 6–4, 6–1	(France) Adrian Mannarino	(Poland) Michał Przysiężny (Israel) Dudi Sela	(Croatia) Franko Škugor (France) Grégoire Burquier (Mexico) Miguel Ángel Reyes-Varela (Germany) Nils Langer
15 April	Copa Internacional de Tenis Total Digest; Mexico City, Mexico; Regular series $35,000+H – hard – 32S/10Q/16D; Singles – Doubles	(Australia) Carsten Ball (Australia) Chris Guccione; 6–3, 3–6, [11–9]	(Australia) Jordan Kerr (Australia) John-Patrick Smith	(Poland) Michał Przysiężny (Israel) Dudi Sela	(Croatia) Franko Škugor (France) Grégoire Burquier (Mexico) Miguel Ángel Reyes-Varela (Germany) Nils Langer
15 April	Visit Panamá Cup; Panama City, Panama; Regular series $35,000+H – clay – 32S/10Q/16D; Singles – Doubles	(Spain) Rubén Ramírez Hidalgo; 6–4, 5–7, 7–6^{(7–4)}	(Colombia) Alejandro González	(Dominican Republic) Víctor Estrella Burgos (Austria) Gerald Melzer	(Portugal) Pedro Sousa (Argentina) Facundo Bagnis (Argentina) Renzo Olivo (Chile) Jorge Aguilar
15 April	Visit Panamá Cup; Panama City, Panama; Regular series $35,000+H – clay – 32S/10Q/16D; Singles – Doubles	(Chile) Jorge Aguilar (Peru) Sergio Galdós; 6–4, 6–4	(Colombia) Alejandro González (Ecuador) Julio César Campozano	(Dominican Republic) Víctor Estrella Burgos (Austria) Gerald Melzer	(Portugal) Pedro Sousa (Argentina) Facundo Bagnis (Argentina) Renzo Olivo (Chile) Jorge Aguilar
15 April	Rai Open; Rome, Italy; Regular series €30,000+H – clay – 32S/10Q/16D; Singles – Doubles	(Germany) Julian Reister; 4–6, 6–3, 6–2	(Spain) Guillermo García López	(Serbia) Dušan Lajović (Germany) Simon Greul	(Ukraine) Oleksandr Nedovyesov (Austria) Andreas Haider-Maurer (Czech Republic) Jiří Veselý (Austria) Martin Fischer
15 April	Rai Open; Rome, Italy; Regular series €30,000+H – clay – 32S/10Q/16D; Singles – Doubles	(Germany) Andreas Beck (Austria) Martin Fischer; 7–6^{(7–2)}, 6–0	(Germany) Martin Emmrich (Australia) Rameez Junaid	(Serbia) Dušan Lajović (Germany) Simon Greul	(Ukraine) Oleksandr Nedovyesov (Austria) Andreas Haider-Maurer (Czech Republic) Jiří Veselý (Austria) Martin Fischer
15 April	Campeonato Internacional de Tenis de Santos; Santos, Brazil; Regular series $35,000+H – clay – 32S/10Q/16D; Singles – Doubles	(Portugal) Gastão Elias; 4–6, 6–2, 6–0	(Brazil) Rogério Dutra da Silva	(Brazil) Guilherme Clezar (Argentina) Guido Andreozzi	(Tunisia) Malek Jaziri (Australia) James Duckworth (Croatia) Antonio Veić (Brazil) João Souza
15 April	Campeonato Internacional de Tenis de Santos; Santos, Brazil; Regular series $35,000+H – clay – 32S/10Q/16D; Singles – Doubles	(Slovakia) Pavol Červenák (Italy) Matteo Viola; 6–2, 4–6, [10–6]	(Brazil) Guilherme Clezar (Portugal) Gastão Elias	(Brazil) Guilherme Clezar (Argentina) Guido Andreozzi	(Tunisia) Malek Jaziri (Australia) James Duckworth (Croatia) Antonio Veić (Brazil) João Souza
22 April	Savannah Challenger; Savannah, United States; Regular series $50,000 – clay (green) – 32S/32Q/16D; Singles – Doubles	(United States) Ryan Harrison; 6–2, 6–3	(Argentina) Facundo Argüello	(Spain) Rubén Ramírez Hidalgo (United States) Donald Young	(United States) Alex Kuznetsov (United States) Wayne Odesnik (Russia) Teymuraz Gabashvili (United States) Michael Russell
22 April	Savannah Challenger; Savannah, United States; Regular series $50,000 – clay (green) – 32S/32Q/16D; Singles – Doubles	(Russia) Teymuraz Gabashvili (Ukraine) Denys Molchanov; 6–2, 7–5	(United States) Michael Russell (United States) Tim Smyczek	(Spain) Rubén Ramírez Hidalgo (United States) Donald Young	(United States) Alex Kuznetsov (United States) Wayne Odesnik (Russia) Teymuraz Gabashvili (United States) Michael Russell
22 April	IS Open de Tênis; São Paulo, Brazil; Regular series $50,000 – clay – 32S/10Q/16D; Singles – Doubles	(Chile) Paul Capdeville; 6–2, 6–2	(Argentina) Renzo Olivo	(Argentina) Máximo González (Brazil) Guilherme Clezar	(Brazil) Rogério Dutra da Silva (Tunisia) Malek Jaziri (Uruguay) Pablo Cuevas (Czech Republic) Dušan Lojda
22 April	IS Open de Tênis; São Paulo, Brazil; Regular series $50,000 – clay – 32S/10Q/16D; Singles – Doubles	(Brazil) Marcelo Demoliner (Brazil) João Souza; 6–4, 3–6, [10–6]	(United States) James Cerretani (France) Pierre-Hugues Herbert	(Argentina) Máximo González (Brazil) Guilherme Clezar	(Brazil) Rogério Dutra da Silva (Tunisia) Malek Jaziri (Uruguay) Pablo Cuevas (Czech Republic) Dušan Lojda
29 April	Tunis Open; Tunis, Tunisia; Regular series $125,000+H – clay – 32S/32Q/16D; Singles – Doubles	(Romania) Adrian Ungur; 4–6, 6–0, 6–2	(Argentina) Diego Sebastián Schwartzman	(France) Kenny de Schepper (France) Florent Serra	(Algeria) Lamine Ouahab (Italy) Andrea Arnaboldi (Moldova) Radu Albot (Ukraine) Oleksandr Nedovyesov
29 April	Tunis Open; Tunis, Tunisia; Regular series $125,000+H – clay – 32S/32Q/16D; Singles – Doubles	(Germany) Dominik Meffert (Austria) Philipp Oswald; 3–6, 7–6^{(7–0)}, [10–7]	(United Kingdom) Jamie Delgado (Sweden) Andreas Siljeström	(France) Kenny de Schepper (France) Florent Serra	(Algeria) Lamine Ouahab (Italy) Andrea Arnaboldi (Moldova) Radu Albot (Ukraine) Oleksandr Nedovyesov
29 April	ATP China International Tennis Challenge; Anning, China; Regular series $50,000 – clay – 32S/10Q/16D; Singles – Doubles	(Hungary) Márton Fucsovics; 7–5, 3–6, 6–3	(United Kingdom) James Ward	(Croatia) Dino Marcan (Chinese Taipei) Yang Tsung-hua	(Australia) Matthew Ebden (China) Zhang Ze (Serbia) Danilo Petrović (Japan) Tatsuma Ito
29 April	ATP China International Tennis Challenge; Anning, China; Regular series $50,000 – clay – 32S/10Q/16D; Singles – Doubles	(Russia) Victor Baluda (Croatia) Dino Marcan; 6–7^{(5–7)}, 6–4, [10–7]	(Australia) Samuel Groth (Australia) John-Patrick Smith	(Croatia) Dino Marcan (Chinese Taipei) Yang Tsung-hua	(Australia) Matthew Ebden (China) Zhang Ze (Serbia) Danilo Petrović (Japan) Tatsuma Ito
29 April	Prosperita Open; Ostrava, Czech Republic; Regular series €85,000+H – clay – 32S/10Q/16D; Singles – Doubles	(Czech Republic) Jiří Veselý; 6–4, 6–4	(Belgium) Steve Darcis	(Czech Republic) Lukáš Rosol (Slovakia) Miloslav Mečíř Jr.	(Croatia) Nikola Mektić (Czech Republic) Jan Hájek (Belgium) Olivier Rochus (Austria) Andreas Haider-Maurer
29 April	Prosperita Open; Ostrava, Czech Republic; Regular series €85,000+H – clay – 32S/10Q/16D; Singles – Doubles	(Belgium) Steve Darcis (Belgium) Olivier Rochus; 7–5, 7–5	(Poland) Tomasz Bednarek (Poland) Mateusz Kowalczyk	(Czech Republic) Lukáš Rosol (Slovakia) Miloslav Mečíř Jr.	(Croatia) Nikola Mektić (Czech Republic) Jan Hájek (Belgium) Olivier Rochus (Austria) Andreas Haider-Maurer
29 April	Soweto Open; Johannesburg, South Africa; Regular series $100,000+H – hard – 32S/10Q/16D; Singles – Doubles	(Canada) Vasek Pospisil; 6–7^{(7–9)}, 6–0, 4–1 ret.	(Poland) Michał Przysiężny	(Slovakia) Lukáš Lacko (Croatia) Mate Pavić	(South Africa) Dean O'Brien (Germany) Dustin Brown (South Africa) Rik de Voest (United States) Rajeev Ram
29 April	Soweto Open; Johannesburg, South Africa; Regular series $100,000+H – hard – 32S/10Q/16D; Singles – Doubles	(India) Prakash Amritraj (United States) Rajeev Ram; 7–6^{(7–1)}, 7–6^{(7–1)}	(India) Purav Raja (India) Divij Sharan	(Slovakia) Lukáš Lacko (Croatia) Mate Pavić	(South Africa) Dean O'Brien (Germany) Dustin Brown (South Africa) Rik de Voest (United States) Rajeev Ram
29 April	Tallahassee Tennis Challenger; Tallahassee, United States; Regular series $50,000 – clay (green) – 32S/10Q/16D; Singles – Doubles	(United States) Denis Kudla; 6–3, 6–3	(Germany) Cedrik-Marcel Stebe	(United States) Tim Smyczek (United States) Ryan Harrison	(Canada) Frank Dancevic (United States) Alex Kuznetsov (Argentina) Facundo Argüello (United States) Donald Young
29 April	Tallahassee Tennis Challenger; Tallahassee, United States; Regular series $50,000 – clay (green) – 32S/10Q/16D; Singles – Doubles	(United States) Austin Krajicek (United States) Tennys Sandgren; 1–6, 6–2, [10–8]	(Australia) Greg Jones (Canada) Peter Polansky	(United States) Tim Smyczek (United States) Ryan Harrison	(Canada) Frank Dancevic (United States) Alex Kuznetsov (Argentina) Facundo Argüello (United States) Donald Young
29 April	Tennis Napoli Cup; Naples, Italy; Regular series €30,000+H – clay – 32S/32Q/16D; Singles – Doubles	(Italy) Potito Starace; 6–2, 2–0 ret.	(Italy) Alessandro Giannessi	(Italy) Filippo Volandri (France) David Guez	(France) Jonathan Dasnières de Veigy (Serbia) Dušan Lajović (Kazakhstan) Andrey Golubev (France) Adrian Mannarino
29 April	Tennis Napoli Cup; Naples, Italy; Regular series €30,000+H – clay – 32S/32Q/16D; Singles – Doubles	(Italy) Stefano Ianni (Italy) Potito Starace; 6–1, 6–3	(Italy) Alessandro Giannessi (Kazakhstan) Andrey Golubev	(Italy) Filippo Volandri (France) David Guez	(France) Jonathan Dasnières de Veigy (Serbia) Dušan Lajović (Kazakhstan) Andrey Golubev (France) Adrian Mannarino

=== May ===
Week of	Tournament	Champions	Runners-up	Semifinalists	Quarterfinalists
6 May	Kunming Challenger; Kunming, China; Regular series $125,000 – hard – 32S/32Q/16D; Singles – Doubles	(Russia) Alex Bogomolov Jr. 6–3, 4–6, 7–6^{(7–2)}	(South Africa) Rik de Voest	(Chinese Taipei) Yang Tsung-hua (Australia) John-Patrick Smith	(Chinese Taipei) Lu Yen-hsun (China) Wu Di (Australia) Samuel Groth (Australia) Matthew Ebden
6 May	Kunming Challenger; Kunming, China; Regular series $125,000 – hard – 32S/32Q/16D; Singles – Doubles	(Australia) Samuel Groth (Australia) John-Patrick Smith; 6–4, 6–1	(Japan) Go Soeda (Japan) Yasutaka Uchiyama	(Chinese Taipei) Yang Tsung-hua (Australia) John-Patrick Smith	(Chinese Taipei) Lu Yen-hsun (China) Wu Di (Australia) Samuel Groth (Australia) Matthew Ebden
6 May	Karshi Challenger; Qarshi, Uzbekistan; Regular series $50,000 – hard – 32S/32Q/16D; Singles – Doubles	(Russia) Teymuraz Gabashvili; 6–4, 6–4	(Moldova) Radu Albot	(Chinese Taipei) Chen Ti (India) Prakash Amritraj	(Czech Republic) Jan Mertl (Ukraine) Oleksandr Nedovyesov (Russia) Konstantin Kravchuk (Russia) Denis Matsukevich
6 May	Karshi Challenger; Qarshi, Uzbekistan; Regular series $50,000 – hard – 32S/32Q/16D; Singles – Doubles	(Chinese Taipei) Chen Ti (Spain) Guillermo Olaso; 7–6^{(7–5)}, 7–5	(Australia) Jordan Kerr (Russia) Konstantin Kravchuk	(Chinese Taipei) Chen Ti (India) Prakash Amritraj	(Czech Republic) Jan Mertl (Ukraine) Oleksandr Nedovyesov (Russia) Konstantin Kravchuk (Russia) Denis Matsukevich
6 May	Rio Quente Resorts Tennis Classic; Rio Quente, Brazil; Regular series $35,000+H – hard – 32S/32Q/16D; Singles – Doubles	(United States) Rajeev Ram; 4–6, 6–4, 6–3	(Brazil) André Ghem	(Australia) James Duckworth (Brazil) Fabiano de Paula	(Brazil) Ricardo Hocevar (Brazil) Guilherme Clezar (Peru) Duilio Beretta (Brazil) Caio Zampieri
6 May	Rio Quente Resorts Tennis Classic; Rio Quente, Brazil; Regular series $35,000+H – hard – 32S/32Q/16D; Singles – Doubles	(Brazil) Fabiano de Paula (Brazil) Marcelo Demoliner; 6–3, 6–4	(Brazil) Ricardo Hocevar (Brazil) Leonardo Kirche	(Australia) James Duckworth (Brazil) Fabiano de Paula	(Brazil) Ricardo Hocevar (Brazil) Guilherme Clezar (Peru) Duilio Beretta (Brazil) Caio Zampieri
6 May	Roma Open; Rome, Italy; Regular series €30,000+H – clay – 32S/32Q/16D; Singles – Doubles	(Slovenia) Aljaž Bedene; 6–4, 6–2	(Italy) Filippo Volandri	(Germany) Matthias Bachinger (Argentina) Federico Delbonis	(Austria) Andreas Haider-Maurer (Serbia) Dušan Lajović (Romania) Adrian Ungur (France) Adrian Mannarino
6 May	Roma Open; Rome, Italy; Regular series €30,000+H – clay – 32S/32Q/16D; Singles – Doubles	(Germany) Andre Begemann (Germany) Martin Emmrich; 7–6^{(7–4)}, 6–3	(Germany) Philipp Marx (Romania) Florin Mergea	(Germany) Matthias Bachinger (Argentina) Federico Delbonis	(Austria) Andreas Haider-Maurer (Serbia) Dušan Lajović (Romania) Adrian Ungur (France) Adrian Mannarino
13 May	BNP Paribas Primrose Bordeaux; Bordeaux, France; Regular series €85,000+H – clay – 32S/32Q/16D; Singles – Doubles	(France) Gaël Monfils; 7–5, 7–6^{(7–5)}	(France) Michaël Llodra	(Belgium) David Goffin (Spain) Guillermo García López	(France) Kenny de Schepper (Argentina) Martín Alund (Belgium) Steve Darcis (France) Marc Gicquel
13 May	BNP Paribas Primrose Bordeaux; Bordeaux, France; Regular series €85,000+H – clay – 32S/32Q/16D; Singles – Doubles	(Germany) Christopher Kas (Austria) Oliver Marach; 2–6, 6–4, [10–1]	(United States) Nicholas Monroe (Germany) Simon Stadler	(Belgium) David Goffin (Spain) Guillermo García López	(France) Kenny de Schepper (Argentina) Martín Alund (Belgium) Steve Darcis (France) Marc Gicquel
13 May	Busan Open Challenger Tennis; Busan, South Korea; Regular series $75,000+H – hard – 32S/32Q/16D; Singles – Doubles	(Israel) Dudi Sela; 6–1, 6–4	(Russia) Alex Bogomolov Jr.	(Republic of Ireland) James McGee (Chinese Taipei) Jimmy Wang	(Thailand) Danai Udomchoke (Australia) Matthew Ebden (Japan) Tatsuma Ito (China) Zhang Ze
13 May	Busan Open Challenger Tennis; Busan, South Korea; Regular series $75,000+H – hard – 32S/32Q/16D; Singles – Doubles	(Chinese Taipei) Peng Hsien-yin (Chinese Taipei) Yang Tsung-hua; 6–4, 6–3	(South Korea) Jeong Suk-young (South Korea) Lim Yong-kyu	(Republic of Ireland) James McGee (Chinese Taipei) Jimmy Wang	(Thailand) Danai Udomchoke (Australia) Matthew Ebden (Japan) Tatsuma Ito (China) Zhang Ze
13 May	Samarkand Challenger; Samarkand, Uzbekistan; Regular series $50,000 – clay – 32S/32Q/16D; Singles – Doubles	(Russia) Teymuraz Gabashvili; 6–3, 6–4	(Ukraine) Oleksandr Nedovyesov	(Uzbekistan) Farrukh Dustov (Spain) Pere Riba	(Serbia) Filip Krajinović (Moldova) Radu Albot (France) Lucas Pouille (Belarus) Aliaksandr Bury
13 May	Samarkand Challenger; Samarkand, Uzbekistan; Regular series $50,000 – clay – 32S/32Q/16D; Singles – Doubles	(Uzbekistan) Farrukh Dustov (Ukraine) Oleksandr Nedovyesov; 6–1, 7–6^{(9–7)}	(Moldova) Radu Albot (Australia) Jordan Kerr	(Uzbekistan) Farrukh Dustov (Spain) Pere Riba	(Serbia) Filip Krajinović (Moldova) Radu Albot (France) Lucas Pouille (Belarus) Aliaksandr Bury
20 May	No tournaments scheduled.				
27 May	No tournaments scheduled.				

=== June ===
Week of	Tournament	Champions	Runners-up	Semifinalists	Quarterfinalists
3 June	UniCredit Czech Open; Prostějov, Czech Republic; Regular series €106,500+H – clay – 32S/29Q/16D; Singles – Doubles	(Czech Republic) Radek Štěpánek; 6–4, 6–2	(Czech Republic) Jiří Veselý	(Russia) Teymuraz Gabashvili (Germany) Peter Gojowczyk	(Czech Republic) Jan Hájek (Spain) Albert Montañés (Spain) Albert Ramos (Czech Republic) Lukáš Rosol
3 June	UniCredit Czech Open; Prostějov, Czech Republic; Regular series €106,500+H – clay – 32S/29Q/16D; Singles – Doubles	(United States) Nicholas Monroe (Germany) Simon Stadler; 6–4, 6–4	(Poland) Mateusz Kowalczyk (Czech Republic) Lukáš Rosol	(Russia) Teymuraz Gabashvili (Germany) Peter Gojowczyk	(Czech Republic) Jan Hájek (Spain) Albert Montañés (Spain) Albert Ramos (Czech Republic) Lukáš Rosol
3 June	Città di Caltanissetta; Caltanissetta, Italy; Regular series $64,000+H – clay – 32S/24Q/16D; Singles – Doubles	(Serbia) Dušan Lajović; 7–6^{(7–4)}, 6–3	(Netherlands) Robin Haase	(India) Somdev Devvarman (Italy) Potito Starace	(Germany) Dominik Meffert (Argentina) Federico Delbonis (Netherlands) Thiemo de Bakker (Italy) Marco Cecchinato
3 June	Città di Caltanissetta; Caltanissetta, Italy; Regular series $64,000+H – clay – 32S/24Q/16D; Singles – Doubles	(Germany) Dominik Meffert (Austria) Philipp Oswald; 6–2, 6–3	(Italy) Alessandro Giannessi (Italy) Potito Starace	(India) Somdev Devvarman (Italy) Potito Starace	(Germany) Dominik Meffert (Argentina) Federico Delbonis (Netherlands) Thiemo de Bakker (Italy) Marco Cecchinato
3 June	Aegon Trophy; Nottingham, Great Britain; Regular series €64,000 – grass – 32S/32Q/16D; Singles – Doubles	(Australia) Matthew Ebden; 7–5, 4–6, 7–5	(Germany) Benjamin Becker	(France) Kenny de Schepper (United States) Bobby Reynolds	(France) Adrian Mannarino (Germany) Michael Berrer (United Kingdom) Daniel Evans (Belgium) Ruben Bemelmans
3 June	Aegon Trophy; Nottingham, Great Britain; Regular series €64,000 – grass – 32S/32Q/16D; Singles – Doubles	(United Kingdom) Jamie Murray (Australia) John Peers; 6–2, 6–7^{(3–7)}, [10–6]	(United Kingdom) Ken Skupski (United Kingdom) Neal Skupski	(France) Kenny de Schepper (United States) Bobby Reynolds	(France) Adrian Mannarino (Germany) Michael Berrer (United Kingdom) Daniel Evans (Belgium) Ruben Bemelmans
3 June	Franken Challenge; Fürth, Germany; Regular series €42,000+H – clay – 32S/31Q/16D; Singles – Doubles	(Portugal) João Sousa; 3–6, 6–3, 6–4	(United States) Wayne Odesnik	(Germany) Cedrik-Marcel Stebe (Austria) Andreas Haider-Maurer	(Italy) Lorenzo Giustino (Germany) Andreas Beck (Germany) Simon Greul (Brazil) Leonardo Kirche
3 June	Franken Challenge; Fürth, Germany; Regular series €42,000+H – clay – 32S/31Q/16D; Singles – Doubles	(Australia) Colin Ebelthite (Australia) Rameez Junaid; 6–4, 7–5	(United States) Christian Harrison (New Zealand) Michael Venus	(Germany) Cedrik-Marcel Stebe (Austria) Andreas Haider-Maurer	(Italy) Lorenzo Giustino (Germany) Andreas Beck (Germany) Simon Greul (Brazil) Leonardo Kirche
3 June	BRD Arad Challenger; Arad, Romania; Regular series €42,000+H – clay – 32S/31Q/16D; Singles – Doubles	(Romania) Adrian Ungur; 6–4, 7–6^{(7–3)}	(Romania) Marius Copil	(Spain) Pere Riba (France) Jonathan Eysseric	(Argentina) Facundo Bagnis (Switzerland) Henri Laaksonen (Argentina) Guido Andreozzi (Chinese Taipei) Yang Tsung-hua
3 June	BRD Arad Challenger; Arad, Romania; Regular series €42,000+H – clay – 32S/31Q/16D; Singles – Doubles	(Croatia) Franko Škugor (Croatia) Antonio Veić; 7–6^{(7–5)},4–6, [11–9]	(Argentina) Facundo Bagnis (Ecuador) Julio César Campozano	(Spain) Pere Riba (France) Jonathan Eysseric	(Argentina) Facundo Bagnis (Switzerland) Henri Laaksonen (Argentina) Guido Andreozzi (Chinese Taipei) Yang Tsung-hua
10 June	Prague Open by Advantage Cars; Prague, Czech Republic; Regular series €42,500 – clay – 32S/19Q/16D; Singles – Doubles	(Ukraine) Oleksandr Nedovyesov; 6–0, 6–1	(Spain) Javier Martí	(Czech Republic) Ivo Minář (Spain) Rubén Ramírez Hidalgo	(Austria) Andreas Haider-Maurer (Kazakhstan) Andrey Golubev (Tunisia) Marsel İlhan (Slovakia) Pavol Červenák
10 June	Prague Open by Advantage Cars; Prague, Czech Republic; Regular series €42,500 – clay – 32S/19Q/16D; Singles – Doubles	(Chinese Taipei) Lee Hsin-han (Chinese Taipei) Peng Hsien-yin; 6–4, 4–6, [10–5]	(United States) Vahid Mirzadeh (United States) Denis Zivkovic	(Czech Republic) Ivo Minář (Spain) Rubén Ramírez Hidalgo	(Austria) Andreas Haider-Maurer (Kazakhstan) Andrey Golubev (Tunisia) Marsel İlhan (Slovakia) Pavol Červenák
10 June	Aegon Nottingham Challenge; Nottingham, Great Britain; Regular series €64,000 – grass – 32S/32Q/16D; Singles – Doubles	(United States) Steve Johnson; 7–5, 7–5	(Belgium) Ruben Bemelmans	(South Africa) Rik de Voest (India) Somdev Devvarman	(Belarus) Dzmitry Zhyrmont (Japan) Go Soeda (Ukraine) Illya Marchenko (United States) Donald Young
10 June	Aegon Nottingham Challenge; Nottingham, Great Britain; Regular series €64,000 – grass – 32S/32Q/16D; Singles – Doubles	(Thailand) Sanchai Ratiwatana (Thailand) Sonchat Ratiwatana; 7–6^{(7–5)}, 6–7^{(3–7)}, [10–8]	(India) Purav Raja (India) Divij Sharan	(South Africa) Rik de Voest (India) Somdev Devvarman	(Belarus) Dzmitry Zhyrmont (Japan) Go Soeda (Ukraine) Illya Marchenko (United States) Donald Young
10 June	Internationaux de Tennis de BLOIS; Blois, France; Regular series €30,000+H – clay – 32S/32Q/16D; Singles – Doubles	(Germany) Julian Reister; 6–1, 6–7^{(3–7)}, 7–6^{(7–2)}	(Serbia) Dušan Lajović	(France) Marc Gicquel (Chile) Paul Capdeville	(France) David Guez (Spain) Pablo Carreño (Argentina) Guido Andreozzi (Colombia) Alejandro González
10 June	Internationaux de Tennis de BLOIS; Blois, France; Regular series €30,000+H – clay – 32S/32Q/16D; Singles – Doubles	(France) Jonathan Eysseric (France) Nicolas Renavand; 6–3, 6–4	(Philippines) Ruben Gonzales (Australia) Chris Letcher	(France) Marc Gicquel (Chile) Paul Capdeville	(France) David Guez (Spain) Pablo Carreño (Argentina) Guido Andreozzi (Colombia) Alejandro González
10 June	Košice Open; Košice, Slovakia; Regular series €30,000+H – clay – 32S/32Q/16D; Singles – Doubles	(Kazakhstan) Mikhail Kukushkin; 6–4, 1–6, 6–2	(Bosnia and Herzegovina) Damir Džumhur	(Moldova) Radu Albot (Brazil) André Ghem	(Slovakia) Andrej Martin (Ecuador) Julio César Campozano (Croatia) Antonio Veić (Slovakia) Miloslav Mečíř Jr.
10 June	Košice Open; Košice, Slovakia; Regular series €30,000+H – clay – 32S/32Q/16D; Singles – Doubles	(Slovakia) Kamil Čapkovič (Slovakia) Igor Zelenay; 6–4, 7–6^{(7–5)}	(Germany) Gero Kretschmer (Germany) Alexander Satschko	(Moldova) Radu Albot (Brazil) André Ghem	(Slovakia) Andrej Martin (Ecuador) Julio César Campozano (Croatia) Antonio Veić (Slovakia) Miloslav Mečíř Jr.
17 June	Morocco Tennis Tour – Tanger; Tanger, Morocco; Regular series €30,000+H – clay – 32S/32Q/16D; Singles – Doubles	(Spain) Pablo Carreño; 6–2, 4–1 ret	(Kazakhstan) Mikhail Kukushkin	(Slovakia) Adrian Sikora (Italy) Lorenzo Giustino	(Spain) Rubén Ramírez Hidalgo (France) Grégoire Burquier (Austria) Gerald Melzer (Spain) Roberto Carballés Baena
17 June	Morocco Tennis Tour – Tanger; Tanger, Morocco; Regular series €30,000+H – clay – 32S/32Q/16D; Singles – Doubles	(Serbia) Nikola Ćirić (Serbia) Goran Tošić; 6–3, 6–7^{(5–7)}, [10–8]	(Austria) Maximilian Neuchrist (Croatia) Mate Pavić	(Slovakia) Adrian Sikora (Italy) Lorenzo Giustino	(Spain) Rubén Ramírez Hidalgo (France) Grégoire Burquier (Austria) Gerald Melzer (Spain) Roberto Carballés Baena
17 June	Aspria Tennis Cup – Trofeo CDI; Milan, Italy; Regular series €30,000+H – clay – 32S/28Q/16D; Singles – Doubles	(Italy) Filippo Volandri; 6–3, 6–2	(Slovakia) Andrej Martin	(Italy) Andrea Arnaboldi (Slovakia) Norbert Gomboš	(Ecuador) Julio César Campozano (Serbia) Filip Krajinović (Italy) Simone Vagnozzi (Italy) Riccardo Sinicropi
17 June	Aspria Tennis Cup – Trofeo CDI; Milan, Italy; Regular series €30,000+H – clay – 32S/28Q/16D; Singles – Doubles	(Italy) Marco Crugnola (Italy) Daniele Giorgini; 4–6, 7–5, [10–8]	(Australia) Alex Bolt (Chinese Taipei) Peng Hsien-yin	(Italy) Andrea Arnaboldi (Slovakia) Norbert Gomboš	(Ecuador) Julio César Campozano (Serbia) Filip Krajinović (Italy) Simone Vagnozzi (Italy) Riccardo Sinicropi
24 June	Marburg Open; Marburg, Germany; Regular series €30,000+H – clay – 32S/29Q/16D; Singles – Doubles	(Kazakhstan) Andrey Golubev; 6–1, 6–3	(Argentina) Diego Sebastián Schwartzman	(Netherlands) Jesse Huta Galung (Argentina) Máximo González	(Germany) Tim Pütz (Slovakia) Norbert Gomboš (Chile) Paul Capdeville (Slovakia) Andrej Martin
24 June	Marburg Open; Marburg, Germany; Regular series €30,000+H – clay – 32S/29Q/16D; Singles – Doubles	(Kazakhstan) Andrey Golubev (Kazakhstan) Evgeny Korolev; 6–3, 1–6, [10–6]	(Netherlands) Jesse Huta Galung (Australia) Jordan Kerr	(Netherlands) Jesse Huta Galung (Argentina) Máximo González	(Germany) Tim Pütz (Slovakia) Norbert Gomboš (Chile) Paul Capdeville (Slovakia) Andrej Martin

=== July ===
Week of	Tournament	Champions	Runners-up	Semifinalists	Quarterfinalists
1 July	Sparkassen Open; Braunschweig, Germany; Regular series €106,500+H – clay – 32S/26Q/16D; Singles – Doubles	(Germany) Florian Mayer; 4–6, 6–2, 6–1	(Czech Republic) Jiří Veselý	(Argentina) Máximo González (Serbia) Filip Krajinović	(Argentina) Federico Delbonis (Germany) Björn Phau (Kazakhstan) Andrey Golubev (Croatia) Antonio Veić
1 July	Sparkassen Open; Braunschweig, Germany; Regular series €106,500+H – clay – 32S/26Q/16D; Singles – Doubles	(Poland) Tomasz Bednarek (Poland) Mateusz Kowalczyk; 6–2, 7–6^{(7–4)}	(Sweden) Andreas Siljeström (Slovakia) Igor Zelenay	(Argentina) Máximo González (Serbia) Filip Krajinović	(Argentina) Federico Delbonis (Germany) Björn Phau (Kazakhstan) Andrey Golubev (Croatia) Antonio Veić
1 July	Nielsen Pro Tennis Championships; Winnetka, United States; Regular series $50,000 – hard – 32S/24Q/16D; Singles – Doubles	(United States) Jack Sock; 6–4, 6–2	(United States) Bradley Klahn	(Russia) Alex Bogomolov Jr. (India) Somdev Devvarman	(Germany) Mischa Zverev (United States) Tim Smyczek (United States) Donald Young (United States) Steve Johnson
1 July	Nielsen Pro Tennis Championships; Winnetka, United States; Regular series $50,000 – hard – 32S/24Q/16D; Singles – Doubles	(India) Yuki Bhambri (New Zealand) Michael Venus; 2–6, 6–2, [10–8]	(India) Somdev Devvarman (United States) Jack Sock	(Russia) Alex Bogomolov Jr. (India) Somdev Devvarman	(Germany) Mischa Zverev (United States) Tim Smyczek (United States) Donald Young (United States) Steve Johnson
1 July	BRD Timișoara Challenger; Timișoara, Romania; Regular series €30,000+H – clay – 32S/10Q/16D; Singles – Doubles	(Austria) Andreas Haider-Maurer; 6–4, 3–6, 6–4	(Spain) Rubén Ramírez Hidalgo	(Romania) Victor Crivoi (Serbia) Miljan Zekić	(Romania) Adrian Ungur (Italy) Simone Vagnozzi (Spain) Pablo Carreño (France) Jonathan Eysseric
1 July	BRD Timișoara Challenger; Timișoara, Romania; Regular series €30,000+H – clay – 32S/10Q/16D; Singles – Doubles	(France) Jonathan Eysseric (France) Nicolas Renavand; 6–7^{(6–8)}, 6–2, [10–7]	(Serbia) Ilija Vučić (Serbia) Miljan Zekić	(Romania) Victor Crivoi (Serbia) Miljan Zekić	(Romania) Adrian Ungur (Italy) Simone Vagnozzi (Spain) Pablo Carreño (France) Jonathan Eysseric
1 July	Tilia Slovenia Open; Portorož, Slovenia; Regular series €30,000+H – hard – 32S/22Q/16D; Singles – Doubles	(Slovenia) Grega Žemlja; 6–4, 7–5	(Austria) Martin Fischer	(Slovenia) Aljaž Bedene (Spain) Adrián Menéndez Maceiras	(Czech Republic) Michal Konečný (Italy) Flavio Cipolla (Belarus) Uladzimir Ignatik (Russia) Evgeny Donskoy
1 July	Tilia Slovenia Open; Portorož, Slovenia; Regular series €30,000+H – hard – 32S/22Q/16D; Singles – Doubles	(Croatia) Marin Draganja (Croatia) Mate Pavić; 6–3, 1–6, [10–5]	(Slovenia) Aljaž Bedene (Slovenia) Blaž Rola	(Slovenia) Aljaž Bedene (Spain) Adrián Menéndez Maceiras	(Czech Republic) Michal Konečný (Italy) Flavio Cipolla (Belarus) Uladzimir Ignatik (Russia) Evgeny Donskoy
1 July	Manta Open; Manta, Ecuador; Regular series $35,000+H – hard – 32S/32Q/16D; Singles – Doubles	(United States) Michael Russell; 4–6, 6–0, 7–5	(Australia) Greg Jones	(Colombia) Alejandro González (Argentina) Facundo Argüello	(United States) Greg Ouellette (El Salvador) Marcelo Arévalo (Ecuador) Emilio Gómez (Argentina) Andrea Collarini
1 July	Manta Open; Manta, Ecuador; Regular series $35,000+H – hard – 32S/32Q/16D; Singles – Doubles	(El Salvador) Marcelo Arévalo (Peru) Sergio Galdós; 6–3, 6–4	(Colombia) Alejandro González (Colombia) Carlos Salamanca	(Colombia) Alejandro González (Argentina) Facundo Argüello	(United States) Greg Ouellette (El Salvador) Marcelo Arévalo (Ecuador) Emilio Gómez (Argentina) Andrea Collarini
1 July	Distalnet Tennis Cup; Todi, Italy; Regular series €30,000+H – clay – 32S/32Q/16D; Singles – Doubles	(Spain) Pere Riba; 7–6^{(7–5)}, 2–6, 7–6^{(8–6)}	(Colombia) Santiago Giraldo	(Italy) Thomas Fabbiano (Italy) Paolo Lorenzi	(Slovakia) Andrej Martin (Italy) Gianluca Naso (Portugal) João Sousa (Chile) Hans Podlipnik Castillo
1 July	Distalnet Tennis Cup; Todi, Italy; Regular series €30,000+H – clay – 32S/32Q/16D; Singles – Doubles	(Colombia) Santiago Giraldo (Colombia) Cristian Rodríguez; 4–6, 7–6^{(7–2)}, [10–3]	(Italy) Andrea Arnaboldi (Italy) Gianluca Naso	(Italy) Thomas Fabbiano (Italy) Paolo Lorenzi	(Slovakia) Andrej Martin (Italy) Gianluca Naso (Portugal) João Sousa (Chile) Hans Podlipnik Castillo
8 July	PTT Cup; Istanbul, Turkey; Regular series €42,500 – hard – 32S/31Q/16D; Singles – Doubles	(Germany) Benjamin Becker; 6–1, 2–6, 3–2 ret.	(Israel) Dudi Sela	(Spain) Adrián Menéndez Maceiras (Russia) Teymuraz Gabashvili	(Belgium) David Goffin (Egypt) Mohamed Safwat (Slovakia) Karol Beck (Kazakhstan) Mikhail Kukushkin
8 July	PTT Cup; Istanbul, Turkey; Regular series €42,500 – hard – 32S/31Q/16D; Singles – Doubles	(Republic of Ireland) James Cluskey (France) Fabrice Martin; 3–6, 6–3, [10–5]	(United Kingdom) Brydan Klein (South Africa) Ruan Roelofse	(Spain) Adrián Menéndez Maceiras (Russia) Teymuraz Gabashvili	(Belgium) David Goffin (Egypt) Mohamed Safwat (Slovakia) Karol Beck (Kazakhstan) Mikhail Kukushkin
8 July	Beijing International Challenger; Beijing, China; Regular series $75,000+H – hard – 32S/32Q/16D; Singles – Doubles	(Chinese Taipei) Lu Yen-hsun; 6–2, 6–4	(Japan) Go Soeda	(Japan) Hiroki Kondo (China) Zhang Ze	(China) Di Wu (South Korea) Jung-Woong Na (New Zealand) Jose Rubin Statham (Japan) Hiroki Moriya
8 July	Beijing International Challenger; Beijing, China; Regular series $75,000+H – hard – 32S/32Q/16D; Singles – Doubles	(Japan) Toshihide Matsui (Thailand) Danai Udomchoke; 4–6, 7–6^{(8–6)}, [10–8]	(China) Gong Maoxin (China) Zhang Ze	(Japan) Hiroki Kondo (China) Zhang Ze	(China) Di Wu (South Korea) Jung-Woong Na (New Zealand) Jose Rubin Statham (Japan) Hiroki Moriya
8 July	Sport 1 Open; Scheveningen, Netherlands; Regular series €42,500+H – clay – 32S/27Q/16D; Singles – Doubles	(Netherlands) Jesse Huta Galung; 6–3, 6–7^{(2–7)} 6–4	(Netherlands) Robin Haase	(Netherlands) Thomas Schoorel (France) Marc Gicquel	(Netherlands) Matwé Middelkoop (Italy) Lorenzo Giustino (Brazil) Thiago Monteiro (France) Stéphane Robert
8 July	Sport 1 Open; Scheveningen, Netherlands; Regular series €42,500+H – clay – 32S/27Q/16D; Singles – Doubles	(Netherlands) Antal van der Duim (Netherlands) Boy Westerhof; 6–3, 6–3	(Germany) Gero Kretschmer (Germany) Alexander Satschko	(Netherlands) Thomas Schoorel (France) Marc Gicquel	(Netherlands) Matwé Middelkoop (Italy) Lorenzo Giustino (Brazil) Thiago Monteiro (France) Stéphane Robert
8 July	Banca dell’Adriatico Tennis Cup; San Benedetto, Italy; Regular series €30,000+H – clay – 32S/31Q/16D; Singles – Doubles	(Slovakia) Andrej Martin; 6–4, 6–3	(Portugal) João Sousa	(Italy) Thomas Fabbiano (Italy) Stefano Travaglia	(Spain) Pere Riba (Austria) Andreas Haider-Maurer (Italy) Alessandro Giannessi (Slovakia) Norbert Gomboš
8 July	Banca dell’Adriatico Tennis Cup; San Benedetto, Italy; Regular series €30,000+H – clay – 32S/31Q/16D; Singles – Doubles	(France) Pierre-Hugues Herbert (France) Maxime Teixeira; 6–4, 6–3	(Italy) Alessandro Giannessi (Portugal) João Sousa	(Italy) Thomas Fabbiano (Italy) Stefano Travaglia	(Spain) Pere Riba (Austria) Andreas Haider-Maurer (Italy) Alessandro Giannessi (Slovakia) Norbert Gomboš
15 July	Levene Gouldin & Thompson Tennis Challenger; Binghamton, United States; Regular series $50,000 – hard – 32S/32Q/16D; Singles – Doubles	(United States) Alex Kuznetsov; 6–4, 3–6, 6–3	(United States) Bradley Klahn	(United States) Rhyne Williams (United States) Austin Krajicek	(Zimbabwe) Takanyi Garanganga (United States) Tennys Sandgren (India) Sanam Singh (Germany) Mischa Zverev
15 July	Levene Gouldin & Thompson Tennis Challenger; Binghamton, United States; Regular series $50,000 – hard – 32S/32Q/16D; Singles – Doubles	(United States) Bradley Klahn (New Zealand) Michael Venus; 6–3, 6–4	(Australia) Adam Feeney (Australia) John-Patrick Smith	(United States) Rhyne Williams (United States) Austin Krajicek	(Zimbabwe) Takanyi Garanganga (United States) Tennys Sandgren (India) Sanam Singh (Germany) Mischa Zverev
15 July	Challenger Banque Nationale de Granby; Granby, Canada; Regular series $50,000+H – hard – 32S/32Q/16D; Singles – Doubles	(Canada) Frank Dancevic; 6–4, 6–7^{(4–7)}, 6–3	(Slovakia) Lukáš Lacko	(Japan) Hiroki Moriya (Canada) Philip Bester	(United Kingdom) James Ward (Japan) Tatsuma Ito (Canada) Filip Peliwo (Australia) Benjamin Mitchell
15 July	Challenger Banque Nationale de Granby; Granby, Canada; Regular series $50,000+H – hard – 32S/32Q/16D; Singles – Doubles	(Canada) Érik Chvojka (Canada) Peter Polansky; 6–4, 6–3	(United States) Adam El Mihdawy (Croatia) Ante Pavić	(Japan) Hiroki Moriya (Canada) Philip Bester	(United Kingdom) James Ward (Japan) Tatsuma Ito (Canada) Filip Peliwo (Australia) Benjamin Mitchell
15 July	Eskişehir Cup; Eskişehir, Turkey; Regular series €42,500 – hard – 32S/23Q/16D; Singles – Doubles	(Belgium) David Goffin; 4–6, 7–5, 6–2	(Turkey) Marsel İlhan	(Russia) Teymuraz Gabashvili (Switzerland) Marco Chiudinelli	(Austria) Maximilian Neuchrist (Spain) Enrique López Pérez (United Kingdom) Edward Corrie (Slovakia) Karol Beck
15 July	Eskişehir Cup; Eskişehir, Turkey; Regular series €42,500 – hard – 32S/23Q/16D; Singles – Doubles	(Croatia) Marin Draganja (Croatia) Mate Pavić; 6–3, 3–6, [10–7]	(Thailand) Sanchai Ratiwatana (Thailand) Sonchat Ratiwatana	(Russia) Teymuraz Gabashvili (Switzerland) Marco Chiudinelli	(Austria) Maximilian Neuchrist (Spain) Enrique López Pérez (United Kingdom) Edward Corrie (Slovakia) Karol Beck
15 July	Poznań Open; Poznań, Poland; Regular series €30,000+H – clay – 32S/32Q/16D; Singles – Doubles	(Austria) Andreas Haider-Maurer; 4–6, 6–1, 7–5	(Bosnia and Herzegovina) Damir Džumhur	(Spain) Pablo Carreño (France) Stéphane Robert	(Switzerland) Henri Laaksonen (Spain) Roberto Carballés Baena (Portugal) João Sousa (Poland) Grzegorz Panfil
15 July	Poznań Open; Poznań, Poland; Regular series €30,000+H – clay – 32S/32Q/16D; Singles – Doubles	(Germany) Gero Kretschmer (Germany) Alexander Satschko; 6–3, 6–3	(Finland) Henri Kontinen (Poland) Mateusz Kowalczyk	(Spain) Pablo Carreño (France) Stéphane Robert	(Switzerland) Henri Laaksonen (Spain) Roberto Carballés Baena (Portugal) João Sousa (Poland) Grzegorz Panfil
15 July	Guzzini Challenger; Recanati, Italy; Regular series €30,000+H – hard – 32S/24Q/16D; Singles – Doubles	(Italy) Thomas Fabbiano; 6–0, 6–3	(France) David Guez	(France) Albano Olivetti (Spain) Adrián Menéndez Maceiras	(Italy) Salvatore Caruso (Italy) Flavio Cipolla (France) Josselin Ouanna (Switzerland) Michael Lammer
15 July	Guzzini Challenger; Recanati, Italy; Regular series €30,000+H – hard – 32S/24Q/16D; Singles – Doubles	(United Kingdom) Ken Skupski (United Kingdom) Neal Skupski; 6–4, 6–2	(Italy) Gianluigi Quinzi (Italy) Adelchi Virgili	(France) Albano Olivetti (Spain) Adrián Menéndez Maceiras	(Italy) Salvatore Caruso (Italy) Flavio Cipolla (France) Josselin Ouanna (Switzerland) Michael Lammer
22 July	President's Cup; Astana, Kazakhstan; Regular series $125,000 – hard – 32S/31Q/16D; Singles – Doubles	(Israel) Dudi Sela; 5–7, 6–2, 7–6^{(8–6)}	(Kazakhstan) Mikhail Kukushkin	(Russia) Konstantin Kravchuk (Kazakhstan) Andrey Golubev	(Ukraine) Ivan Sergeyev (Belarus) Dzmitry Zhyrmont (Turkey) Marsel İlhan (Russia) Teymuraz Gabashvili
22 July	President's Cup; Astana, Kazakhstan; Regular series $125,000 – hard – 32S/31Q/16D; Singles – Doubles	(Italy) Riccardo Ghedin (Italy) Claudio Grassi; 3–6, 6–3, [10–8]	(Kazakhstan) Andrey Golubev (Kazakhstan) Mikhail Kukushkin	(Russia) Konstantin Kravchuk (Kazakhstan) Andrey Golubev	(Ukraine) Ivan Sergeyev (Belarus) Dzmitry Zhyrmont (Turkey) Marsel İlhan (Russia) Teymuraz Gabashvili
22 July	Fifth Third Bank Tennis Championships; Lexington, United States; Regular series $50,000 – hard – 32S/32Q/16D; Singles – Doubles	(United Kingdom) James Ward; 4–6, 6–3, 6–4	(Australia) James Duckworth	(United States) Bradley Klahn (Canada) Filip Peliwo	(Ukraine) Illya Marchenko (United States) Tennys Sandgren (Tunisia) Malek Jaziri (Japan) Tatsuma Ito
22 July	Fifth Third Bank Tennis Championships; Lexington, United States; Regular series $50,000 – hard – 32S/32Q/16D; Singles – Doubles	(Canada) Frank Dancevic (Canada) Peter Polansky; 7–5, 6–3	(United States) Bradley Klahn (New Zealand) Michael Venus	(United States) Bradley Klahn (Canada) Filip Peliwo	(Ukraine) Illya Marchenko (United States) Tennys Sandgren (Tunisia) Malek Jaziri (Japan) Tatsuma Ito
22 July	Tampere Open; Tampere, Finland; Regular series €42,500 – clay – 32S/29Q/16D; Singles – Doubles	(Netherlands) Jesse Huta Galung; 6–4, 6–3	(France) Maxime Teixeira	(Slovenia) Blaž Rola (Estonia) Jürgen Zopp	(Moldova) Maxim Dubarenco (Belgium) Germain Gigounon (Finland) Micke Kontinen (Spain) Guillermo Olaso
22 July	Tampere Open; Tampere, Finland; Regular series €42,500 – clay – 32S/29Q/16D; Singles – Doubles	(Finland) Henri Kontinen (Serbia) Goran Tošić; 6–4, 6–4	(Philippines) Ruben Gonzales (Australia) Chris Letcher	(Slovenia) Blaž Rola (Estonia) Jürgen Zopp	(Moldova) Maxim Dubarenco (Belgium) Germain Gigounon (Finland) Micke Kontinen (Spain) Guillermo Olaso
22 July	Seguros Bolívar Open Medellín; Medellín, Colombia; Regular series $50,000+H – clay – 32S/32Q/16D; Singles – Doubles	(Colombia) Alejandro González; 6–4, 6–4	(Argentina) Guido Andreozzi	(Dominican Republic) Víctor Estrella Burgos (Colombia) Carlos Salamanca	(Ecuador) Roberto Quiroz (Argentina) Eduardo Schwank (Argentina) Facundo Argüello (Colombia) Nicolás Barrientos
22 July	Seguros Bolívar Open Medellín; Medellín, Colombia; Regular series $50,000+H – clay – 32S/32Q/16D; Singles – Doubles	(Ecuador) Emilio Gómez (Moldova) Roman Borvanov; 6–3, 7–6^{(7–4)}	(Colombia) Nicolás Barrientos (Colombia) Eduardo Struvay	(Dominican Republic) Víctor Estrella Burgos (Colombia) Carlos Salamanca	(Ecuador) Roberto Quiroz (Argentina) Eduardo Schwank (Argentina) Facundo Argüello (Colombia) Nicolás Barrientos
22 July	Oberstaufen Cup; Oberstaufen, Germany; Regular series €30,000+H – clay – 32S/12Q/16D; Singles – Doubles	(France) Guillaume Rufin; 6–3, 6–4	(Germany) Peter Gojowczyk	(Ukraine) Oleksandr Nedovyesov (Germany) Dominik Meffert	(Brazil) Thiago Monteiro (Germany) Andreas Beck (Moldova) Radu Albot (Argentina) Martín Alund
22 July	Oberstaufen Cup; Oberstaufen, Germany; Regular series €30,000+H – clay – 32S/12Q/16D; Singles – Doubles	(Germany) Dominik Meffert (Austria) Philipp Oswald; 6–1, 3–6, [14–12]	(Netherlands) Stephan Fransen (New Zealand) Artem Sitak	(Ukraine) Oleksandr Nedovyesov (Germany) Dominik Meffert	(Brazil) Thiago Monteiro (Germany) Andreas Beck (Moldova) Radu Albot (Argentina) Martín Alund
22 July	Guimarães Open; Guimarães, Portugal; Regular series €42,500 – hard – 32S/29Q/16D; Singles – Doubles	(Portugal) João Sousa; 6–3, 6–0	(Romania) Marius Copil	(Italy) Flavio Cipolla (Spain) Andrés Artuñedo	(Italy) Matteo Viola (Austria) Maximilian Neuchrist (Japan) Taro Daniel (Spain) Daniel Muñoz de la Nava
22 July	Guimarães Open; Guimarães, Portugal; Regular series €42,500 – hard – 32S/29Q/16D; Singles – Doubles	(Republic of Ireland) James Cluskey (Austria) Maximilian Neuchrist; 6–7^{(5–7)}, 6–2, [10–8]	(Spain) Roberto Ortega Olmedo (Spain) Ricardo Villacorta-Alonso	(Italy) Flavio Cipolla (Spain) Andrés Artuñedo	(Italy) Matteo Viola (Austria) Maximilian Neuchrist (Japan) Taro Daniel (Spain) Daniel Muñoz de la Nava
22 July	Trofeo Stefano Bellaveglia; Orbetello, Italy; Regular series €30,000+H – clay – 32S/29Q/16D; Singles – Doubles	(Italy) Filippo Volandri; 6–4, 7–6^{(9–7)}	(Spain) Pere Riba	(Spain) Roberto Carballés Baena (Spain) Pablo Carreño	(Argentina) Renzo Olivo (France) Florent Serra (Italy) Simone Vagnozzi (Italy) Alessandro Giannessi
22 July	Trofeo Stefano Bellaveglia; Orbetello, Italy; Regular series €30,000+H – clay – 32S/29Q/16D; Singles – Doubles	(Italy) Marco Crugnola (Italy) Simone Vagnozzi; 7–6^{(7–3)}, 6–7^{(5–7)}, [10–6]	(Argentina) Guillermo Durán (Argentina) Renzo Olivo	(Spain) Roberto Carballés Baena (Spain) Pablo Carreño	(Argentina) Renzo Olivo (France) Florent Serra (Italy) Simone Vagnozzi (Italy) Alessandro Giannessi
30 July	Odlum Brown Vancouver Open; Vancouver, Canada; Regular series $100,000 – hard – 32S/32Q/16D; Singles – Doubles	(Canada) Vasek Pospisil; 6–0, 1–6, 7–5	(United Kingdom) Daniel Evans	(United States) Bobby Reynolds (Chinese Taipei) Wang Yeu-tzuoo	(Belgium) Olivier Rochus (Canada) Frank Dancevic (United States) Wayne Odesnik (Australia) Greg Jones
30 July	Odlum Brown Vancouver Open; Vancouver, Canada; Regular series $100,000 – hard – 32S/32Q/16D; Singles – Doubles	(Israel) Jonathan Erlich (Israel) Andy Ram; 6–1, 6–4	(United States) James Cerretani (Canada) Adil Shamasdin	(United States) Bobby Reynolds (Chinese Taipei) Wang Yeu-tzuoo	(Belgium) Olivier Rochus (Canada) Frank Dancevic (United States) Wayne Odesnik (Australia) Greg Jones
30 July	Open Castilla y León; Segovia, Spain; Regular series €42,500 – hard – 32S/32Q/16D; Singles – Doubles	(Spain) Pablo Carreño; 6–4, 7–6^{(7–2)}	(France) Albano Olivetti	(Switzerland) Marco Chiudinelli (Spain) Roberto Ortega Olmedo	(France) Florent Serra (Greece) Theodoros Angelinos (Spain) Gerard Granollers (Hungary) Márton Fucsovics
30 July	Open Castilla y León; Segovia, Spain; Regular series €42,500 – hard – 32S/32Q/16D; Singles – Doubles	(United Kingdom) Ken Skupski (United Kingdom) Neal Skupski; 6–3, 6–7^{(4–7)}, [10–6]	(Russia) Mikhail Elgin (Belarus) Uladzimir Ignatik	(Switzerland) Marco Chiudinelli (Spain) Roberto Ortega Olmedo	(France) Florent Serra (Greece) Theodoros Angelinos (Spain) Gerard Granollers (Hungary) Márton Fucsovics
30 July	São Paulo Challenger de Tênis; São Paulo, Brazil; Regular series $50,000 – clay – 32S/32Q/16D; Singles – Doubles	(Colombia) Alejandro González; 6–2, 6–3	(Argentina) Eduardo Schwank	(Slovenia) Blaž Rola (Dominican Republic) José Hernández	(Brazil) João Souza (Argentina) Agustín Velotti (Argentina) Marco Trungelliti (Chile) Paul Capdeville
30 July	São Paulo Challenger de Tênis; São Paulo, Brazil; Regular series $50,000 – clay – 32S/32Q/16D; Singles – Doubles	(Brazil) Fernando Romboli (Argentina) Eduardo Schwank; 6–7^{(6–8)}, 6–4, [10–8]	(Colombia) Nicolás Barrientos (El Salvador) Marcelo Arévalo	(Slovenia) Blaž Rola (Dominican Republic) José Hernández	(Brazil) João Souza (Argentina) Agustín Velotti (Argentina) Marco Trungelliti (Chile) Paul Capdeville
30 July	Svijany Open; Liberec, Czech Republic; Regular series €30,000+H – clay – 32S/32Q/16D; Singles – Doubles	(Czech Republic) Jiří Veselý; 6–7^{(2–7)}, 7–6^{(9–7)}, 6–4	(Argentina) Federico Delbonis	(Slovenia) Blaž Kavčič (Spain) Pere Riba	(Czech Republic) Jan Mertl (Poland) Grzegorz Panfil (Spain) Guillermo Olaso (Italy) Thomas Fabbiano
30 July	Svijany Open; Liberec, Czech Republic; Regular series €30,000+H – clay – 32S/32Q/16D; Singles – Doubles	(Australia) Rameez Junaid (Germany) Tim Pütz; 6–0, 6–2	(Australia) Colin Ebelthite (Chinese Taipei) Lee Hsin-han	(Slovenia) Blaž Kavčič (Spain) Pere Riba	(Czech Republic) Jan Mertl (Poland) Grzegorz Panfil (Spain) Guillermo Olaso (Italy) Thomas Fabbiano

=== August ===
Week of	Tournament	Champions	Runners-up	Semifinalists	Quarterfinalists
5 August	Comerica Bank Challenger; Aptos, United States; Regular series $100,000 – hard – 32S/32Q/16D; Singles – Doubles	(United States) Bradley Klahn; 3–6, 7–6^{(7–5)}, 6–4	(United Kingdom) Daniel Evans	(Uzbekistan) Farrukh Dustov (Russia) Evgeny Donskoy	(Argentina) Guido Pella (United States) Tennys Sandgren (United States) Wayne Odesnik (Germany) Mischa Zverev
5 August	Comerica Bank Challenger; Aptos, United States; Regular series $100,000 – hard – 32S/32Q/16D; Singles – Doubles	(Israel) Jonathan Erlich (Israel) Andy Ram; 6–3, 6–7^{(6–8)}, [10–2]	(Australia) Chris Guccione (Australia) Matt Reid	(Uzbekistan) Farrukh Dustov (Russia) Evgeny Donskoy	(Argentina) Guido Pella (United States) Tennys Sandgren (United States) Wayne Odesnik (Germany) Mischa Zverev
5 August	San Marino CEPU Open; City of San Marino, San Marino; Regular Series €85,000+H – clay – 32S/32Q/16D; Singles – Doubles	(Italy) Marco Cecchinato; 6–3, 6–4	(Italy) Filippo Volandri	(Spain) Daniel Gimeno Traver (Germany) Jan-Lennard Struff	(Slovenia) Blaž Kavčič (France) Guillaume Rufin (Czech Republic) Jiří Veselý (Romania) Adrian Ungur
5 August	San Marino CEPU Open; City of San Marino, San Marino; Regular Series €85,000+H – clay – 32S/32Q/16D; Singles – Doubles	(United States) Nicholas Monroe (Germany) Simon Stadler; 6–2, 6–4	(Italy) Daniele Bracciali (Romania) Florin Mergea	(Spain) Daniel Gimeno Traver (Germany) Jan-Lennard Struff	(Slovenia) Blaž Kavčič (France) Guillaume Rufin (Czech Republic) Jiří Veselý (Romania) Adrian Ungur
5 August	Peugeot Tennis Cup; Rio de Janeiro, Brazil; Regular series $50,000 – clay – 32S/32Q/16D; Singles – Doubles	(Argentina) Agustín Velotti; 6–3, 6–4	(Slovenia) Blaž Rola	(Ecuador) Emilio Gómez (Argentina) Eduardo Schwank	(Brazil) Guilherme Clezar (Brazil) Leonardo Kirche (Chile) Bastián Malla (Chile) Cristian Garín
5 August	Peugeot Tennis Cup; Rio de Janeiro, Brazil; Regular series $50,000 – clay – 32S/32Q/16D; Singles – Doubles	(Netherlands) Thiemo de Bakker (Brazil) André Sá; 6–3, 6–2	(Brazil) Marcelo Demoliner (Brazil) João Souza	(Ecuador) Emilio Gómez (Argentina) Eduardo Schwank	(Brazil) Guilherme Clezar (Brazil) Leonardo Kirche (Chile) Bastián Malla (Chile) Cristian Garín
12 August	Kazan Summer Cup; Kazan, Russia; Regular series $50,000 – hard – 32S/32Q/16D; Singles – Doubles	(Ukraine) Sergiy Stakhovsky; 6–2, 6–3	(Russia) Valery Rudnev	(Russia) Alexander Kudryavtsev (Russia) Konstantin Kravchuk	(Russia) Aslan Karatsev (Italy) Matteo Viola (Slovakia) Adrian Sikora (Russia) Alexander Lobkov
12 August	Kazan Summer Cup; Kazan, Russia; Regular series $50,000 – hard – 32S/32Q/16D; Singles – Doubles	(Russia) Victor Baluda (Russia) Konstantin Kravchuk; 6–3, 6–4	(Slovakia) Ivo Klec (Estonia) Jürgen Zopp	(Russia) Alexander Kudryavtsev (Russia) Konstantin Kravchuk	(Russia) Aslan Karatsev (Italy) Matteo Viola (Slovakia) Adrian Sikora (Russia) Alexander Lobkov
12 August	Crédit Agricole Friuladria Tennis Cup; Cordenons, Italy; Regular Series €42,500+H – clay – 32S/32Q/16D; Singles – Doubles	(Spain) Pablo Carreño; 6–4, 6–4	(France) Grégoire Burquier	(Italy) Paolo Lorenzi (Italy) Potito Starace	(Italy) Gianluca Naso (Slovakia) Norbert Gomboš (Italy) Filippo Volandri (Slovenia) Janez Semrajc
12 August	Crédit Agricole Friuladria Tennis Cup; Cordenons, Italy; Regular Series €42,500+H – clay – 32S/32Q/16D; Singles – Doubles	(Croatia) Marin Draganja (Croatia) Franko Škugor; 6–4, 6–4	(Slovakia) Norbert Gomboš (Czech Republic) Roman Jebavý	(Italy) Paolo Lorenzi (Italy) Potito Starace	(Italy) Gianluca Naso (Slovakia) Norbert Gomboš (Italy) Filippo Volandri (Slovenia) Janez Semrajc
12 August	Maserati Challenger; Meerbusch, Germany; Regular series €30,000+H – clay – 32S/32Q/16D; Singles – Doubles	(Czech Republic) Jan Hájek; 6–3, 6–4	(Netherlands) Jesse Huta Galung	(Spain) Pere Riba (Slovakia) Miloslav Mečíř Jr.	(Belgium) Yannick Mertens (Germany) Dustin Brown (Germany) Simon Greul (Germany) Bastian Knittel
12 August	Maserati Challenger; Meerbusch, Germany; Regular series €30,000+H – clay – 32S/32Q/16D; Singles – Doubles	(Australia) Rameez Junaid (Germany) Frank Moser; 6–3, 7–6^{(7–4)}	(Germany) Dustin Brown (Germany) Philipp Marx	(Spain) Pere Riba (Slovakia) Miloslav Mečíř Jr.	(Belgium) Yannick Mertens (Germany) Dustin Brown (Germany) Simon Greul (Germany) Bastian Knittel
19 August	No tournaments scheduled.				
26 August	Chang-Sat Bangkok Open; Bangkok, Thailand; Regular series $50,000 – hard – 32S/32Q/16D; Singles – Doubles	(Slovenia) Blaž Kavčič; 6–3, 6–1	(South Korea) Jeong Suk-Young	(Chinese Taipei) Wang Yeu-tzuoo (Australia) Matthew Ebden	(Russia) Alexander Kudryavtsev (Australia) Matt Reid (Japan) Yūichi Sugita (Japan) Hiroki Moriya
26 August	Chang-Sat Bangkok Open; Bangkok, Thailand; Regular series $50,000 – hard – 32S/32Q/16D; Singles – Doubles	(Chinese Taipei) Chen Ti (Chinese Taipei) Huang Liang-chi; 6–3, 6–2	(South Korea) Jeong Suk-Young (South Korea) Nam Ji Sung	(Chinese Taipei) Wang Yeu-tzuoo (Australia) Matthew Ebden	(Russia) Alexander Kudryavtsev (Australia) Matt Reid (Japan) Yūichi Sugita (Japan) Hiroki Moriya
26 August	Città di Como Challenger; Como, Italy; Regular series €30,000+H – clay – 32S/32Q/16D; Singles – Doubles	(Spain) Pablo Carreño; 6–2, 5–7, 6–0	(Austria) Dominic Thiem	(Italy) Marco Crugnola (Italy) Lorenzo Giustino	(Italy) Gianluca Naso (Russia) Teymuraz Gabashvili (Germany) Simon Greul (Serbia) Ilija Bozoljac
26 August	Città di Como Challenger; Como, Italy; Regular series €30,000+H – clay – 32S/32Q/16D; Singles – Doubles	(Australia) Rameez Junaid (Slovakia) Igor Zelenay; 7–5, 7–6^{(7–2)}	(Italy) Marco Crugnola (Italy) Stefano Ianni	(Italy) Marco Crugnola (Italy) Lorenzo Giustino	(Italy) Gianluca Naso (Russia) Teymuraz Gabashvili (Germany) Simon Greul (Serbia) Ilija Bozoljac

=== September ===
Week of	Tournament	Champions	Runners-up	Semifinalists	Quarterfinalists
2 September	AON Open Challenger; Genoa, Italy; Regular series €85,000+H – clay – 32S/32Q/16D; Singles – Doubles	(Germany) Dustin Brown; 7–6^{(7–5)},6–3	(Italy) Filippo Volandri	(Italy) Paolo Lorenzi (Slovakia) Andrej Martin	(Italy) Andrea Arnaboldi (Czech Republic) Jan Hájek (Spain) Pablo Carreño (Italy) Alessio di Mauro
2 September	AON Open Challenger; Genoa, Italy; Regular series €85,000+H – clay – 32S/32Q/16D; Singles – Doubles	(Italy) Daniele Bracciali (Austria) Oliver Marach; 6–3, 2–6, [11–9]	(Croatia) Marin Draganja (Croatia) Mate Pavić	(Italy) Paolo Lorenzi (Slovakia) Andrej Martin	(Italy) Andrea Arnaboldi (Czech Republic) Jan Hájek (Spain) Pablo Carreño (Italy) Alessio di Mauro
2 September	TEAN International; Alphen aan den Rijn, Netherlands; Regular series €42,500 – clay – 32S/32Q/16D; Singles – Doubles	(Spain) Daniel Gimeno Traver; 6–2, 6–4	(Netherlands) Thomas Schoorel	(Netherlands) Thiemo de Bakker (Netherlands) Jesse Huta Galung	(Czech Republic) Marek Michalička (Belgium) Ruben Bemelmans (Germany) Richard Becker (Netherlands) Boy Westerhof
2 September	TEAN International; Alphen aan den Rijn, Netherlands; Regular series €42,500 – clay – 32S/32Q/16D; Singles – Doubles	(Netherlands) Antal van der Duim (Netherlands) Boy Westerhof; 4–6, 6–3, [12–10]	(Germany) Simon Greul (Netherlands) Wesley Koolhof	(Netherlands) Thiemo de Bakker (Netherlands) Jesse Huta Galung	(Czech Republic) Marek Michalička (Belgium) Ruben Bemelmans (Germany) Richard Becker (Netherlands) Boy Westerhof
2 September	Shanghai Challenger; Shanghai, China; Regular series $50,000 – hard – 32S/32Q/16D; Singles – Doubles	(Japan) Yūichi Sugita; 6–3, 6–3	(Japan) Hiroki Moriya	(China) Zhang Ze (Japan) Yasutaka Uchiyama	(China) Wu Di (Tunisia) Malek Jaziri (Japan) Tatsuma Ito (Japan) Toshihide Matsui
2 September	Shanghai Challenger; Shanghai, China; Regular series $50,000 – hard – 32S/32Q/16D; Singles – Doubles	(Thailand) Sanchai Ratiwatana (Thailand) Sonchat Ratiwatana; 6–3, 6–4	(Chinese Taipei) Lee Hsin-han (Chinese Taipei) Peng Hsien-yin	(China) Zhang Ze (Japan) Yasutaka Uchiyama	(China) Wu Di (Tunisia) Malek Jaziri (Japan) Tatsuma Ito (Japan) Toshihide Matsui
2 September	Trophée des Alpilles; Saint-Rémy-de-Provence, France; Regular series €42,500 – hard – 32S/32Q/16D; Singles – Doubles	(France) Marc Gicquel; 6–4, 6–3	(Italy) Matteo Viola	(Austria) Martin Fischer (France) Paul-Henri Mathieu	(Kazakhstan) Andrey Golubev (France) Pierre-Hugues Herbert (Italy) Flavio Cipolla (France) Josselin Ouanna
2 September	Trophée des Alpilles; Saint-Rémy-de-Provence, France; Regular series €42,500 – hard – 32S/32Q/16D; Singles – Doubles	(France) Pierre-Hugues Herbert (France) Albano Olivetti; 6–3, 6–7^{(5–7)}, [15–13]	(France) Marc Gicquel (France) Josselin Ouanna	(Austria) Martin Fischer (France) Paul-Henri Mathieu	(Kazakhstan) Andrey Golubev (France) Pierre-Hugues Herbert (Italy) Flavio Cipolla (France) Josselin Ouanna
2 September	BRD Brașov Challenger; Brașov, Romania; Regular series €30,000+H – clay – 32S/32Q/16D; Singles – Doubles	(Austria) Andreas Haider-Maurer; 6–7^{(9–11)},6–4, 6–2	(Austria) Gerald Melzer	(Serbia) Dušan Lajović (Germany) Julian Reister	(France) Lucas Pouille (Ukraine) Oleksandr Nedovyesov (Italy) Thomas Fabbiano (Romania) Patrick Ciorcilă
2 September	BRD Brașov Challenger; Brașov, Romania; Regular series €30,000+H – clay – 32S/32Q/16D; Singles – Doubles	(Ukraine) Oleksandr Nedovyesov (Czech Republic) Jaroslav Pospíšil; 6–3, 6–1	(Romania) Teodor-Dacian Crăciun (Romania) Petru-Alexandru Luncanu	(Serbia) Dušan Lajović (Germany) Julian Reister	(France) Lucas Pouille (Ukraine) Oleksandr Nedovyesov (Italy) Thomas Fabbiano (Romania) Patrick Ciorcilă
9 September	American Express – TED Open; Istanbul, Turkey; Regular series $75,000 – hard – 32S/32Q/16D; Singles – Doubles	(Kazakhstan) Mikhail Kukushkin; 6–3, 6–3	(Ukraine) Illya Marchenko	(Spain) Guillermo García-López (Australia) John-Patrick Smith	(Italy) Flavio Cipolla (Bosnia and Herzegovina) Aldin Šetkić (Austria) Martin Fischer (Russia) Konstantin Kravchuk
9 September	American Express – TED Open; Istanbul, Turkey; Regular series $75,000 – hard – 32S/32Q/16D; Singles – Doubles	(United Kingdom) Jamie Delgado (Australia) Jordan Kerr; 6–3, 6–2	(Republic of Ireland) James Cluskey (Spain) Adrián Menéndez Maceiras	(Spain) Guillermo García-López (Australia) John-Patrick Smith	(Italy) Flavio Cipolla (Bosnia and Herzegovina) Aldin Šetkić (Austria) Martin Fischer (Russia) Konstantin Kravchuk
9 September	Seguros Bolívar Open Cali; Cali, Colombia; Regular series $50,000+H – clay – 32S/32Q/16D; Singles – Doubles	(Argentina) Facundo Bagnis; 6–2, 4–6, 6–3	(Argentina) Facundo Argüello	(Brazil) João Souza (Argentina) Andrea Collarini	(Brazil) Ricardo Hocevar (Brazil) Thales Turini (Argentina) Agustín Velotti (Argentina) Guido Andreozzi
9 September	Seguros Bolívar Open Cali; Cali, Colombia; Regular series $50,000+H – clay – 32S/32Q/16D; Singles – Doubles	(Argentina) Guido Andreozzi (Argentina) Eduardo Schwank; 6–2, 6–4	(Colombia) Carlos Salamanca (Brazil) João Souza	(Brazil) João Souza (Argentina) Andrea Collarini	(Brazil) Ricardo Hocevar (Brazil) Thales Turini (Argentina) Agustín Velotti (Argentina) Guido Andreozzi
9 September	ATP Roller Open; Pétange, Luxembourg; Regular series €64,000 – hard (indoor) – 32S/32Q/16D; Singles – Doubles	(Germany) Tobias Kamke; 1–6, 6–3, 7–5	(France) Paul-Henri Mathieu	(Belgium) Niels Desein (Estonia) Jürgen Zopp	(Germany) Jan-Lennard Struff (Germany) Benjamin Becker (Lithuania) Ričardas Berankis (Switzerland) Stéphane Bohli
9 September	ATP Roller Open; Pétange, Luxembourg; Regular series €64,000 – hard (indoor) – 32S/32Q/16D; Singles – Doubles	(United Kingdom) Ken Skupski (United Kingdom) Neal Skupski; 6–3, 6–7^{(5–7)}, [10–7]	(Germany) Benjamin Becker (Germany) Tobias Kamke	(Belgium) Niels Desein (Estonia) Jürgen Zopp	(Germany) Jan-Lennard Struff (Germany) Benjamin Becker (Lithuania) Ričardas Berankis (Switzerland) Stéphane Bohli
9 September	Banja Luka Challenger; Banja Luka, Bosnia and Herzegovina; Regular series €64,000+H – clay – 32S/32Q/16D; Singles – Doubles	(Slovenia) Aljaž Bedene; 6–3, 6–4	(Argentina) Diego Sebastián Schwartzman	(Italy) Filippo Volandri (Croatia) Kristijan Mesaros	(Ukraine) Oleksandr Nedovyesov (Czech Republic) Jan Mertl (Croatia) Ante Pavić (Slovakia) Norbert Gomboš
9 September	Banja Luka Challenger; Banja Luka, Bosnia and Herzegovina; Regular series €64,000+H – clay – 32S/32Q/16D; Singles – Doubles	(Croatia) Marin Draganja (Croatia) Nikola Mektić; 6–4, 3–6, [10–6]	(Germany) Dominik Meffert (Ukraine) Oleksandr Nedovyesov	(Italy) Filippo Volandri (Croatia) Kristijan Mesaros	(Ukraine) Oleksandr Nedovyesov (Czech Republic) Jan Mertl (Croatia) Ante Pavić (Slovakia) Norbert Gomboš
9 September	Copa Sevilla; Sevilla, Spain; Regular series €42,500+H – clay – 32S/32Q/16D; Singles – Doubles	(Spain) Daniel Gimeno Traver; 6–4, 7–6^{(7–2)}	(France) Stéphane Robert	(Argentina) Renzo Olivo (Germany) Andreas Beck	(Italy) Riccardo Bellotti (United Kingdom) Alexander Ward (Spain) Carlos Gómez-Herrera (Spain) Albert Ramos
9 September	Copa Sevilla; Sevilla, Spain; Regular series €42,500+H – clay – 32S/32Q/16D; Singles – Doubles	(Italy) Alessandro Motti (France) Stéphane Robert; 7–5, 7–5	(Netherlands) Stephan Fransen (Netherlands) Wesley Koolhof	(Argentina) Renzo Olivo (Germany) Andreas Beck	(Italy) Riccardo Bellotti (United Kingdom) Alexander Ward (Spain) Carlos Gómez-Herrera (Spain) Albert Ramos
9 September	Morocco Tennis Tour – Meknes; Meknes, Morocco; Regular series €30,000+H – clay – 32S/29Q/16D; Singles – Doubles	(Germany) Cedrik-Marcel Stebe; 6–1, 4–6, 6–2	(Belgium) Yannik Reuter	(Belgium) Kimmer Coppejans (France) Laurent Lokoli	(Spain) Juan Lizariturry (Canada) Steven Diez (Austria) Gerald Melzer (Spain) Jordi Samper Montaña
9 September	Morocco Tennis Tour – Meknes; Meknes, Morocco; Regular series €30,000+H – clay – 32S/29Q/16D; Singles – Doubles	(Italy) Alessandro Giannessi (Italy) Gianluca Naso; 7–5, 7–6^{(7–3)}	(Spain) Gerard Granollers (Spain) Jordi Samper Montaña	(Belgium) Kimmer Coppejans (France) Laurent Lokoli	(Spain) Juan Lizariturry (Canada) Steven Diez (Austria) Gerald Melzer (Spain) Jordi Samper Montaña
16 September	OEC Kaohsiung; Kaohsiung, Taiwan; Regular series $125,000+H – hard – 32S/29Q/16D; Singles – Doubles	(Chinese Taipei) Lu Yen-hsun; 6–4, 6–3	(India) Yuki Bhambri	(Australia) Matthew Ebden (United States) Jack Sock	(Chinese Taipei) Wang Yeu-tzuoo (South Korea) Lim Yong-Kyu (Colombia) Alejandro González (Australia) John-Patrick Smith
16 September	OEC Kaohsiung; Kaohsiung, Taiwan; Regular series $125,000+H – hard – 32S/29Q/16D; Singles – Doubles	(Colombia) Juan Sebastián Cabal (Colombia) Robert Farah; 6–4, 6–2	(India) Yuki Bhambri (Chinese Taipei) Wang Chieh-fu	(Australia) Matthew Ebden (United States) Jack Sock	(Chinese Taipei) Wang Yeu-tzuoo (South Korea) Lim Yong-Kyu (Colombia) Alejandro González (Australia) John-Patrick Smith
16 September	Pekao Szczecin Open; Szczecin, Poland; Regular Series €106,500+H – clay – 32S/32Q/16D; Singles – Doubles	(Ukraine) Oleksandr Nedovyesov; 6–2, 7–5	(Spain) Pere Riba	(Argentina) Diego Sebastián Schwartzman (Italy) Potito Starace	(Poland) Grzegorz Panfil (Croatia) Antonio Veić (Czech Republic) Jan Mertl (Spain) Pablo Andújar
16 September	Pekao Szczecin Open; Szczecin, Poland; Regular Series €106,500+H – clay – 32S/32Q/16D; Singles – Doubles	(United Kingdom) Ken Skupski (United Kingdom) Neal Skupski; 6–4, 1–6, [10–7]	(Italy) Andrea Arnaboldi (Italy) Alessandro Giannessi	(Argentina) Diego Sebastián Schwartzman (Italy) Potito Starace	(Poland) Grzegorz Panfil (Croatia) Antonio Veić (Czech Republic) Jan Mertl (Spain) Pablo Andújar
16 September	Türk Telecom İzmir Cup; İzmir, Turkey; Regular series €64,000 – hard – 32S/32Q/16D; Singles – Doubles	(Kazakhstan) Mikhail Kukushkin; 6–1, 6–4	(Republic of Ireland) Louk Sorensen	(Italy) Flavio Cipolla (China) Di Wu	(Tunisia) Malek Jaziri (Turkey) Marsel İlhan (Germany) Peter Gojowczyk (Spain) Adrián Menéndez Maceiras
16 September	Türk Telecom İzmir Cup; İzmir, Turkey; Regular series €64,000 – hard – 32S/32Q/16D; Singles – Doubles	(United States) Austin Krajicek (United States) Tennys Sandgren; 7–6^{(7–4)}, 6–4	(United Kingdom) Brydan Klein (Australia) Dane Propoggia	(Italy) Flavio Cipolla (China) Di Wu	(Tunisia) Malek Jaziri (Turkey) Marsel İlhan (Germany) Peter Gojowczyk (Spain) Adrián Menéndez Maceiras
16 September	Arimex Challenger Trophy; Trnava, Slovakia; Regular series €42,500+H – clay – 32S/32Q/16D; Singles – Doubles	(Germany) Julian Reister; 7–6^{(7–3)},6–3	(Romania) Adrian Ungur	(Slovenia) Aljaž Bedene (France) Stéphane Robert	(Russia) Andrey Kuznetsov (Croatia) Kristijan Mesaroš (Slovakia) Norbert Gomboš (Czech Republic) Jan Hájek
16 September	Arimex Challenger Trophy; Trnava, Slovakia; Regular series €42,500+H – clay – 32S/32Q/16D; Singles – Doubles	(Croatia) Marin Draganja (Croatia) Mate Pavić; 7–5, 4–6, [10–6]	(Slovenia) Aljaž Bedene (Czech Republic) Jaroslav Pospíšil	(Slovenia) Aljaž Bedene (France) Stéphane Robert	(Russia) Andrey Kuznetsov (Croatia) Kristijan Mesaroš (Slovakia) Norbert Gomboš (Czech Republic) Jan Hájek
16 September	Tetra Pak Tennis Cup; Campinas, Brazil; Regular series $35,000+H – clay – 32S/32Q/16D; Singles – Doubles	(Brazil) Guilherme Clezar; 6–4, 6–4	(Argentina) Facundo Bagnis	(Argentina) Máximo González (United States) Bjorn Fratangelo	(Argentina) Guido Pella (Portugal) Gastão Elias (Brazil) Fernando Romboli (Argentina) Martín Alund
16 September	Tetra Pak Tennis Cup; Campinas, Brazil; Regular series $35,000+H – clay – 32S/32Q/16D; Singles – Doubles	(Argentina) Guido Andreozzi (Argentina) Máximo González; 6–4, 6–4	(Brazil) Thiago Alves (Brazil) Thiago Monteiro	(Argentina) Máximo González (United States) Bjorn Fratangelo	(Argentina) Guido Pella (Portugal) Gastão Elias (Brazil) Fernando Romboli (Argentina) Martín Alund
16 September	Morocco Tennis Tour – Kenitra; Kenitra, Morocco; Regular series €30,000+H – clay – 32S/32Q/16D; Singles – Doubles	(Austria) Dominic Thiem; 7–6^{(7–4)}, 5–1 ret.	(Russia) Teymuraz Gabashvili	(Spain) Gerard Granollers (Slovenia) Blaz Rola	(Germany) Cedrik-Marcel Stebe (Spain) Guillermo Olaso (Russia) Alexander Rumyantsev (Austria) Gerald Melzer
16 September	Morocco Tennis Tour – Kenitra; Kenitra, Morocco; Regular series €30,000+H – clay – 32S/32Q/16D; Singles – Doubles	(Spain) Gerard Granollers (Spain) Jordi Samper Montaña; 6–4, 6–4	(Japan) Taro Daniel (Russia) Alexander Rumyantsev	(Spain) Gerard Granollers (Slovenia) Blaz Rola	(Germany) Cedrik-Marcel Stebe (Spain) Guillermo Olaso (Russia) Alexander Rumyantsev (Austria) Gerald Melzer
16 September	Quito Challenger; Quito, Ecuador; Regular series $35,000+H – clay – 32S/32Q/16D; Singles – Doubles	(Dominican Republic) Víctor Estrella; 2–6, 6–4, 6–4	(Argentina) Marco Trungelliti	(Ecuador) Giovanni Lapentti (United States) Chase Buchanan	(Ecuador) Emilio Gómez (Colombia) Juan Carlos Spir (Colombia) Carlos Salamanca (Argentina) Renzo Olivo
16 September	Quito Challenger; Quito, Ecuador; Regular series $35,000+H – clay – 32S/32Q/16D; Singles – Doubles	(United States) Kevin King (Colombia) Juan Carlos Spir; 7–5, 6–7^{(9–11)}, [11–9]	(Guatemala) Christopher Díaz Figueroa (Colombia) Carlos Salamanca	(Ecuador) Giovanni Lapentti (United States) Chase Buchanan	(Ecuador) Emilio Gómez (Colombia) Juan Carlos Spir (Colombia) Carlos Salamanca (Argentina) Renzo Olivo
23 September	Open d'Orléans; Orléans, France; Regular series €106,500+H – hard (indoor) – 32S/32Q/16D; Singles – Doubles	(Czech Republic) Radek Štěpánek; 6–3, 6–4	(Argentina) Leonardo Mayer	(France) Benoît Paire (France) Pierre-Hugues Herbert	(Czech Republic) Jiří Veselý (Germany) Matthias Bachinger (Ukraine) Illya Marchenko (France) Michaël Llodra
23 September	Open d'Orléans; Orléans, France; Regular series €106,500+H – hard (indoor) – 32S/32Q/16D; Singles – Doubles	(Ukraine) Illya Marchenko (Ukraine) Sergiy Stakhovsky; 7–5, 6–3	(Lithuania) Ričardas Berankis (Croatia) Franko Škugor	(France) Benoît Paire (France) Pierre-Hugues Herbert	(Czech Republic) Jiří Veselý (Germany) Matthias Bachinger (Ukraine) Illya Marchenko (France) Michaël Llodra
23 September	Sibiu Open; Sibiu, Romania; Regular series €30,000+H – clay – 32S/32Q/16D; Singles – Doubles	(Czech Republic) Jaroslav Pospíšil; 4–6, 6–4, 6–1	(Italy) Marco Cecchinato	(Serbia) Dušan Lajović (Romania) Adrian Ungur	(Italy) Filippo Volandri (Serbia) Boris Pašanski (Germany) Julian Reister (Italy) Alessandro Giannessi
23 September	Sibiu Open; Sibiu, Romania; Regular series €30,000+H – clay – 32S/32Q/16D; Singles – Doubles	(Australia) Rameez Junaid (Austria) Philipp Oswald; 6–4, 6–4	(United Kingdom) Jamie Delgado (Australia) Jordan Kerr	(Serbia) Dušan Lajović (Romania) Adrian Ungur	(Italy) Filippo Volandri (Serbia) Boris Pašanski (Germany) Julian Reister (Italy) Alessandro Giannessi
23 September	Fergana Challenger; Fergana, Uzbekistan; Regular series $35,000+H – hard – 32S/28Q/16D; Singles – Doubles	(Moldova) Radu Albot; 7–6^{(11–9)}, 6–7^{(3–7)}, 6–1	(Serbia) Ilija Bozoljac	(Kazakhstan) Andrey Golubev (Tunisia) Malek Jaziri	(Egypt) Mohamed Safwat (Belarus) Aliaksandr Bury (Russia) Alexander Lobkov (Russia) Alexander Kudryavtsev
23 September	Fergana Challenger; Fergana, Uzbekistan; Regular series $35,000+H – hard – 32S/28Q/16D; Singles – Doubles	(Uzbekistan) Farrukh Dustov (Tunisia) Malek Jaziri; 6–3, 6–3	(Serbia) Ilija Bozoljac (Czech Republic) Roman Jebavý	(Kazakhstan) Andrey Golubev (Tunisia) Malek Jaziri	(Egypt) Mohamed Safwat (Belarus) Aliaksandr Bury (Russia) Alexander Lobkov (Russia) Alexander Kudryavtsev
23 September	Aberto de Tênis do Rio Grande do Sul; Porto Alegre, Brazil; Regular series $35,000+H – clay – 32S/32Q/16D; Singles – Doubles	(Argentina) Facundo Argüello; 6–4, 6–1	(Argentina) Máximo González	(Brazil) Guilherme Clezar (Portugal) Pedro Sousa	(Brazil) André Ghem (Brazil) Ricardo Hocevar (Argentina) Guido Andreozzi (Italy) Gianluigi Quinzi
23 September	Aberto de Tênis do Rio Grande do Sul; Porto Alegre, Brazil; Regular series $35,000+H – clay – 32S/32Q/16D; Singles – Doubles	(Argentina) Guillermo Durán (Argentina) Máximo González; 3–6, 6–1, [10–5]	(Dominican Republic) Víctor Estrella (Brazil) João Souza	(Brazil) Guilherme Clezar (Portugal) Pedro Sousa	(Brazil) André Ghem (Brazil) Ricardo Hocevar (Argentina) Guido Andreozzi (Italy) Gianluigi Quinzi
23 September	Napa Valley Challenger; Napa, California, United States; Regular series $50,000 – hard – 32S/32Q/16D; Singles – Doubles	(United States) Donald Young; 4–6, 6–4, 6–2	(Australia) Matthew Ebden	(United States) Alex Kuznetsov (United States) Tim Smyczek	(United States) Denis Kudla (New Zealand) Michael Venus (United States) Rhyne Williams (United States) Bradley Klahn
23 September	Napa Valley Challenger; Napa, California, United States; Regular series $50,000 – hard – 32S/32Q/16D; Singles – Doubles	(United States) Bobby Reynolds (Australia) John-Patrick Smith; 6–4, 7–6^{(7–2)}	(United States) Steve Johnson (United States) Tim Smyczek	(United States) Alex Kuznetsov (United States) Tim Smyczek	(United States) Denis Kudla (New Zealand) Michael Venus (United States) Rhyne Williams (United States) Bradley Klahn
30 September	Ethias Trophy; Mons, Belgium; Regular series €106,500+H – hard – 32S/32Q/16D; Singles – Doubles	(Czech Republic) Radek Štěpánek; 6–3, 7–5	(Netherlands) Igor Sijsling	(France) Marc Gicquel (Germany) Andreas Beck	(Romania) Adrian Ungur (France) Paul-Henri Mathieu (Slovakia) Norbert Gomboš (Germany) Matthias Bachinger
30 September	Ethias Trophy; Mons, Belgium; Regular series €106,500+H – hard – 32S/32Q/16D; Singles – Doubles	(Netherlands) Jesse Huta Galung (Netherlands) Igor Sijsling; 4–6, 7–6^{(7–2)}, [10–7]	(United States) Eric Butorac (South Africa) Raven Klaasen	(France) Marc Gicquel (Germany) Andreas Beck	(Romania) Adrian Ungur (France) Paul-Henri Mathieu (Slovakia) Norbert Gomboš (Germany) Matthias Bachinger
30 September	Sacramento Challenger; Sacramento, United States; Regular series $100,000 – hard– 32S/32Q/16D; Singles – Doubles	(United States) Donald Young; 7–5, 6–3	(United States) Tim Smyczek	(United States) Jarmere Jenkins (Australia) Nick Kyrgios	(Australia) Matt Reid (Australia) Matthew Ebden (United States) Bradley Klahn (Australia) Samuel Groth
30 September	Sacramento Challenger; Sacramento, United States; Regular series $100,000 – hard– 32S/32Q/16D; Singles – Doubles	(Australia) Matt Reid (Australia) John-Patrick Smith; 7–6^{(7–1)}, 4–6, [14–12]	(United States) Jarmere Jenkins (United States) Donald Young	(United States) Jarmere Jenkins (Australia) Nick Kyrgios	(Australia) Matt Reid (Australia) Matthew Ebden (United States) Bradley Klahn (Australia) Samuel Groth
30 September	IS Open; São Paulo, Brazil; Regular series €35,000+H – clay – 32S/32Q/16D; Singles – Doubles	(Argentina) Guido Pella; 6–1, 6–0	(Argentina) Facundo Argüello	(Brazil) Rogério Dutra da Silva (Portugal) Pedro Sousa	(Slovenia) Blaž Kavčič (Brazil) João Souza (Brazil) Thiago Monteiro (Croatia) Antonio Veić
30 September	IS Open; São Paulo, Brazil; Regular series €35,000+H – clay – 32S/32Q/16D; Singles – Doubles	(Moldova) Roman Borvanov (New Zealand) Artem Sitak; 6–4, 7–6^{(7–3)}	(Peru) Sergio Galdós (Argentina) Guido Pella	(Brazil) Rogério Dutra da Silva (Portugal) Pedro Sousa	(Slovenia) Blaž Kavčič (Brazil) João Souza (Brazil) Thiago Monteiro (Croatia) Antonio Veić

=== October ===
Week of	Tournament	Champions	Runners-up	Semifinalists	Quarterfinalists
7 October	Tashkent Challenger; Tashkent, Uzbekistan; Regular series €125,000+H – hard – 32S/32Q/16D; Singles – Doubles	(Israel) Dudi Sela; 6–1, 6–2	(Russia) Teymuraz Gabashvili	(Slovakia) Lukáš Lacko (Israel) Amir Weintraub	(Uzbekistan) Farrukh Dustov (Ukraine) Oleksandr Nedovyesov (Tunisia) Malek Jaziri (Russia) Evgeny Donskoy
7 October	Tashkent Challenger; Tashkent, Uzbekistan; Regular series €125,000+H – hard – 32S/32Q/16D; Singles – Doubles	(Russia) Mikhail Elgin (Russia) Teymuraz Gabashvili; 6–4, 6–4	(India) Purav Raja (India) Divij Sharan	(Slovakia) Lukáš Lacko (Israel) Amir Weintraub	(Uzbekistan) Farrukh Dustov (Ukraine) Oleksandr Nedovyesov (Tunisia) Malek Jaziri (Russia) Evgeny Donskoy
7 October	Tiburon Challenger; Tiburon, United States; Regular series €100,000 – hard – 32S/32Q/16D; Singles – Doubles	(Canada) Peter Polansky; 7–5, 6–3	(Australia) Matthew Ebden	(United States) Denis Kudla (United States) Tim Smyczek	(Australia) John-Patrick Smith (Australia) Benjamin Mitchell (United States) Tennys Sandgren (United States) Donald Young
7 October	Tiburon Challenger; Tiburon, United States; Regular series €100,000 – hard – 32S/32Q/16D; Singles – Doubles	(United States) Austin Krajicek (United States) Rhyne Williams; 6–4, 6–1	(United States) Bradley Klahn (United States) Rajeev Ram	(United States) Denis Kudla (United States) Tim Smyczek	(Australia) John-Patrick Smith (Australia) Benjamin Mitchell (United States) Tennys Sandgren (United States) Donald Young
7 October	Open de Rennes; Rennes, France; Regular series $64,000+H – hard (indoor) – 32S/32Q/16D; Singles – Doubles	(France) Nicolas Mahut; 6–3, 7–6^{(7–3)}	(France) Kenny de Schepper	(France) Maxime Teixeira (France) Marc Gicquel	(Belgium) Kimmer Coppejans (Slovakia) Andrej Martin (Germany) Michael Berrer (France) Josselin Ouanna
7 October	Open de Rennes; Rennes, France; Regular series $64,000+H – hard (indoor) – 32S/32Q/16D; Singles – Doubles	(Austria) Oliver Marach (Romania) Florin Mergea; 6–4, 3–6, [10–7]	(United States) Nicholas Monroe (Germany) Simon Stadler	(France) Maxime Teixeira (France) Marc Gicquel	(Belgium) Kimmer Coppejans (Slovakia) Andrej Martin (Germany) Michael Berrer (France) Josselin Ouanna
7 October	Aberto Rio Preto; São José do Rio Preto, Brazil; Regular series $50,000+H – clay – 32S/32Q/16D; Singles – Doubles	(Brazil) João Souza; 7–6^{(7–0)}, 6–3	(Colombia) Alejandro González	(Portugal) Gastão Elias (Argentina) Guido Pella	(Slovenia) Blaž Kavčič (Brazil) Thiago Alves (Brazil) Thiago Monteiro (Brazil) Rogério Dutra da Silva
7 October	Aberto Rio Preto; São José do Rio Preto, Brazil; Regular series $50,000+H – clay – 32S/32Q/16D; Singles – Doubles	(Colombia) Nicolás Barrientos (Colombia) Carlos Salamanca; 6–4, 6–4	(Brazil) Marcelo Demoliner (Brazil) João Souza	(Portugal) Gastão Elias (Argentina) Guido Pella	(Slovenia) Blaž Kavčič (Brazil) Thiago Alves (Brazil) Thiago Monteiro (Brazil) Rogério Dutra da Silva
7 October	Copa San Juan Gobierno; San Juan, Argentina; Regular series €35,000+H – clay – 32S/12Q/16D; Singles – Doubles	(Argentina) Guido Andreozzi; 6–7^{(5–7)}, 7–6^{(7–4)}, 6–0	(Argentina) Diego Sebastián Schwartzman	(Argentina) Juan Ignacio Londero (Argentina) Máximo González	(Argentina) Pablo Galdón (Argentina) Facundo Bagnis (Argentina) Renzo Olivo (Argentina) Martín Alund
7 October	Copa San Juan Gobierno; San Juan, Argentina; Regular series €35,000+H – clay – 32S/12Q/16D; Singles – Doubles	(Argentina) Guillermo Durán (Argentina) Máximo González; 6–3, 6–0	(Argentina) Martín Alund (Argentina) Facundo Bagnis	(Argentina) Juan Ignacio Londero (Argentina) Máximo González	(Argentina) Pablo Galdón (Argentina) Facundo Bagnis (Argentina) Renzo Olivo (Argentina) Martín Alund
14 October	Internationaux de Tennis de Vendée; Mouilleron-le-Captif, France; Regular series $64,000+H – hard (indoor) – 32S/32Q/16D; Singles – Doubles	(Germany) Michael Berrer; 1–6, 6–4, 6–3	(France) Nicolas Mahut	(France) Michaël Llodra (Germany) Andreas Beck	(Germany) Dustin Brown (France) Grégoire Burquier (France) Josselin Ouanna (France) Maxime Teixeira
14 October	Internationaux de Tennis de Vendée; Mouilleron-le-Captif, France; Regular series $64,000+H – hard (indoor) – 32S/32Q/16D; Singles – Doubles	(France) Fabrice Martin (France) Hugo Nys; 3–6, 6–3, [10–8]	(Finland) Henri Kontinen (Spain) Adrián Menéndez Maceiras	(France) Michaël Llodra (Germany) Andreas Beck	(Germany) Dustin Brown (France) Grégoire Burquier (France) Josselin Ouanna (France) Maxime Teixeira
21 October	Copa Topper; Buenos Aires, Argentina; Regular Series €75,000 – clay – 32S/32Q/16D; Singles – Doubles	(Uruguay) Pablo Cuevas; 7–6^{(8–6)}, 2–6, 6–4	(Argentina) Facundo Argüello	(Argentina) Guido Andreozzi (Canada) Steven Diez	(Argentina) Eduardo Schwank (Spain) Rubén Ramírez Hidalgo (Croatia) Antonio Veić (Argentina) Martín Alund
21 October	Copa Topper; Buenos Aires, Argentina; Regular Series €75,000 – clay – 32S/32Q/16D; Singles – Doubles	(Argentina) Máximo González (Argentina) Diego Sebastián Schwartzman; 6–3, 7–5	(Brazil) Rogério Dutra da Silva (Brazil) André Ghem	(Argentina) Guido Andreozzi (Canada) Steven Diez	(Argentina) Eduardo Schwank (Spain) Rubén Ramírez Hidalgo (Croatia) Antonio Veić (Argentina) Martín Alund
21 October	Kazan Kremlin Cup; Kazan, Russia; Regular series $75,000+H – hard (indoor) – 32S/29Q/16D; Singles – Doubles	(Ukraine) Oleksandr Nedovyesov; 6–4, 6–1	(Kazakhstan) Andrey Golubev	(France) Lucas Pouille (Uzbekistan) Farrukh Dustov	(Russia) Aslan Karatsev (Serbia) Dušan Lajović (Italy) Matteo Viola (Russia) Alexander Lobkov
21 October	Kazan Kremlin Cup; Kazan, Russia; Regular series $75,000+H – hard (indoor) – 32S/29Q/16D; Singles – Doubles	(Moldova) Radu Albot (Uzbekistan) Farrukh Dustov; 6–2, 6–7^{(3–7)}, [10–7]	(Belarus) Egor Gerasimov (Belarus) Dzmitry Zhyrmont	(France) Lucas Pouille (Uzbekistan) Farrukh Dustov	(Russia) Aslan Karatsev (Serbia) Dušan Lajović (Italy) Matteo Viola (Russia) Alexander Lobkov
21 October	Melbourne Challenger; Melbourne, Australia; Regular series €50,000 – hard – 32S/32Q/16D; Singles – Doubles	(Australia) Matthew Ebden; 6–3, 5–7, 6–3	(Japan) Tatsuma Ito	(United Kingdom) James Ward (Australia) James Duckworth	(Australia) Blake Mott (New Zealand) Michael Venus (United States) Bradley Klahn (India) Yuki Bhambri
21 October	Melbourne Challenger; Melbourne, Australia; Regular series €50,000 – hard – 32S/32Q/16D; Singles – Doubles	(Australia) Thanasi Kokkinakis (Australia) Benjamin Mitchell; 6–3, 6–2	(Australia) Alex Bolt (Australia) Andrew Whittington	(United Kingdom) James Ward (Australia) James Duckworth	(Australia) Blake Mott (New Zealand) Michael Venus (United States) Bradley Klahn (India) Yuki Bhambri
28 October	Geneva Open Challenger; Geneva, Switzerland; Regular series €64,000+H – hard (indoor) – 32S/32Q/16D; Singles – Doubles	(Tunisia) Malek Jaziri; 6–4, 6–3	(Germany) Jan-Lennard Struff	(Switzerland) Marco Chiudinelli (Romania) Marius Copil	(Kazakhstan) Andrey Golubev (Slovakia) Norbert Gomboš (Russia) Karen Khachanov (Slovakia) Martin Kližan
28 October	Geneva Open Challenger; Geneva, Switzerland; Regular series €64,000+H – hard (indoor) – 32S/32Q/16D; Singles – Doubles	(Austria) Oliver Marach (Romania) Florin Mergea; 6–4, 6–3	(Czech Republic) František Čermák (Austria) Philipp Oswald	(Switzerland) Marco Chiudinelli (Romania) Marius Copil	(Kazakhstan) Andrey Golubev (Slovakia) Norbert Gomboš (Russia) Karen Khachanov (Slovakia) Martin Kližan
28 October	Charlottesville Men's Pro Challenger; Charlottesville, United States; Regular series €75,000 – hard (indoor) – 32S/32Q/16D; Singles – Doubles	(United States) Michael Russell; 7–5, 2–6, 7–6^{(7–5)}	(Canada) Peter Polansky	(Canada) Jesse Levine (United States) Rhyne Williams	(India) Saketh Myneni (United States) Jarmere Jenkins (United States) Donald Young (India) Somdev Devvarman
28 October	Charlottesville Men's Pro Challenger; Charlottesville, United States; Regular series €75,000 – hard (indoor) – 32S/32Q/16D; Singles – Doubles	(United States) Steve Johnson (United States) Tim Smyczek; 6–4, 6–3	(United States) Jarmere Jenkins (United States) Donald Young	(Canada) Jesse Levine (United States) Rhyne Williams	(India) Saketh Myneni (United States) Jarmere Jenkins (United States) Donald Young (India) Somdev Devvarman
28 October	Uruguay Open; Montevideo, Uruguay; Regular series $50,000 – clay – 32S/28Q/16D; Singles – Doubles	(Brazil) Thomaz Bellucci; 6–4, 6–4	(Argentina) Diego Sebastián Schwartzman	(Argentina) Martín Alund (Uruguay) Pablo Cuevas	(Argentina) Leonardo Mayer (Spain) Pere Riba (Brazil) Rogério Dutra da Silva (Argentina) Renzo Olivo
28 October	Uruguay Open; Montevideo, Uruguay; Regular series $50,000 – clay – 32S/28Q/16D; Singles – Doubles	(Uruguay) Martín Cuevas (Uruguay) Pablo Cuevas; Walkover	(Brazil) André Ghem (Brazil) Rogério Dutra da Silva	(Argentina) Martín Alund (Uruguay) Pablo Cuevas	(Argentina) Leonardo Mayer (Spain) Pere Riba (Brazil) Rogério Dutra da Silva (Argentina) Renzo Olivo
28 October	Samsung Securities Cup; Seoul, South Korea; Regular series $50,000 – hard – 32S/32Q/16D; Singles – Doubles	(Serbia) Dušan Lajović; Walkover	(Germany) Julian Reister	(Japan) Yūichi Sugita (Slovenia) Blaž Kavčič	(China) Di Wu (Japan) Go Soeda (China) Zhang Ze (Japan) Hiroki Moriya
28 October	Samsung Securities Cup; Seoul, South Korea; Regular series $50,000 – hard – 32S/32Q/16D; Singles – Doubles	(Croatia) Marin Draganja (Croatia) Mate Pavić; 7–5, 6–2	(Chinese Taipei) Lee Hsin-han (Chinese Taipei) Peng Hsien-yin	(Japan) Yūichi Sugita (Slovenia) Blaž Kavčič	(China) Di Wu (Japan) Go Soeda (China) Zhang Ze (Japan) Hiroki Moriya
28 October	Traralgon Challenger; Traralgon, Australia; Regular series $50,000 – hard – 32S/32Q/16D; Singles – Doubles	(India) Yuki Bhambri; 6–7^{(13–15)}, 6–3, 6–4	(United States) Bradley Klahn	(United Kingdom) Brydan Klein (Australia) James Duckworth	(Thailand) Danai Udomchoke (Japan) Bumpei Sato (Japan) Tatsuma Ito (Australia) Benjamin Mitchell
28 October	Traralgon Challenger; Traralgon, Australia; Regular series $50,000 – hard – 32S/32Q/16D; Singles – Doubles	(Australia) Ryan Agar (Australia) Adam Feeney; 6–3, 6–4	(Australia) Dane Propoggia (New Zealand) Jose Rubin Statham	(United Kingdom) Brydan Klein (Australia) James Duckworth	(Thailand) Danai Udomchoke (Japan) Bumpei Sato (Japan) Tatsuma Ito (Australia) Benjamin Mitchell
28 October	Morocco Tennis Tour – Casablanca; Casablanca, Morocco; Regular series $30,000+H – clay – 32S/32Q/16D; Singles – Doubles	(Austria) Dominic Thiem; 6–2, 7–5	(Italy) Potito Starace	(Serbia) Filip Krajinović (Austria) Gerald Melzer	(Czech Republic) Jan Hájek (Algeria) Lamine Ouahab (Italy) Flavio Cipolla (Egypt) Mohamed Safwat
28 October	Morocco Tennis Tour – Casablanca; Casablanca, Morocco; Regular series $30,000+H – clay – 32S/32Q/16D; Singles – Doubles	(Italy) Claudio Grassi (Italy) Riccardo Ghedin; 6–4, 6–4	(Germany) Gero Kretschmer (Germany) Alexander Satschko	(Serbia) Filip Krajinović (Austria) Gerald Melzer	(Czech Republic) Jan Hájek (Algeria) Lamine Ouahab (Italy) Flavio Cipolla (Egypt) Mohamed Safwat
28 October	Bauer Watertechnology Cup; Eckental, Germany; Regular series $30,000+H – Synthetic (indoor) – 32S/32Q/16D; Singles – Doubles	(Germany) Benjamin Becker; 2–6, 7–6^{(7–3)}, 6–4	(Belgium) Ruben Bemelmans	(Germany) Dustin Brown (Germany) Tim Pütz	(Germany) Andreas Beck (Czech Republic) Jan Mertl (Germany) Simon Greul (Uzbekistan) Farrukh Dustov
28 October	Bauer Watertechnology Cup; Eckental, Germany; Regular series $30,000+H – Synthetic (indoor) – 32S/32Q/16D; Singles – Doubles	(Germany) Dustin Brown (Germany) Philipp Marx; 7–6^{(7–4)}, 6–2	(Poland) Piotr Gadomski (Poland) Mateusz Kowalczyk	(Germany) Dustin Brown (Germany) Tim Pütz	(Germany) Andreas Beck (Czech Republic) Jan Mertl (Germany) Simon Greul (Uzbekistan) Farrukh Dustov

=== November ===
Week of	Tournament	Champions	Runners-up	Semifinalists	Quarterfinalists
4 November	Open Seguros Bolívar; Bogotá, Colombia; Regular series €125,000+H – clay – 32S/32Q/16D; Singles – Doubles	(Dominican Republic) Víctor Estrella; 6–2, 3–0 retired	(Brazil) Thomaz Bellucci	(Brazil) Guilherme Clezar (Colombia) Alejandro Falla	(Argentina) Guido Pella (Argentina) Facundo Argüello (Italy) Paolo Lorenzi (Colombia) Santiago Giraldo
4 November	Open Seguros Bolívar; Bogotá, Colombia; Regular series €125,000+H – clay – 32S/32Q/16D; Singles – Doubles	(Colombia) Juan Sebastián Cabal (Colombia) Alejandro González; 6–3, 6–2	(Colombia) Nicolás Barrientos (Colombia) Eduardo Struvay	(Brazil) Guilherme Clezar (Colombia) Alejandro Falla	(Argentina) Guido Pella (Argentina) Facundo Argüello (Italy) Paolo Lorenzi (Colombia) Santiago Giraldo
4 November	Slovak Open; Bratislava, Slovakia; Regular series €64,000+H – hard (indoor) – 32S/32Q/16D; Singles – Doubles	(Slovakia) Lukáš Lacko; 6–4, 4–6, 6–4	(Czech Republic) Lukáš Rosol	(Netherlands) Igor Sijsling (Germany) Jan-Lennard Struff	(Romania) Adrian Ungur (France) Kenny de Schepper (Bosnia and Herzegovina) Damir Džumhur (Ukraine) Sergiy Stakhovsky
4 November	Slovak Open; Bratislava, Slovakia; Regular series €64,000+H – hard (indoor) – 32S/32Q/16D; Singles – Doubles	(Finland) Henri Kontinen (Sweden) Andreas Siljeström; 7–6^{(8–6)}, 6–2	(Germany) Gero Kretschmer (Germany) Jan-Lennard Struff	(Netherlands) Igor Sijsling (Germany) Jan-Lennard Struff	(Romania) Adrian Ungur (France) Kenny de Schepper (Bosnia and Herzegovina) Damir Džumhur (Ukraine) Sergiy Stakhovsky
4 November	Sparkasse ATP Challenger; Urtijëi, Italy; Regular series $64,000 – hard (indoor) – 32S/32Q/16D; Singles – Doubles	(Italy) Andreas Seppi; 7–6^{(7–4)}, 6–2	(Germany) Simon Greul	(Russia) Teymuraz Gabashvili (Germany) Dustin Brown	(Canada) Frank Dancevic (Germany) Benjamin Becker (Croatia) Nikola Mektić (France) Pierre-Hugues Herbert
4 November	Sparkasse ATP Challenger; Urtijëi, Italy; Regular series $64,000 – hard (indoor) – 32S/32Q/16D; Singles – Doubles	(Germany) Christopher Kas (Germany) Tim Pütz; 6–2, 7–5	(Germany) Benjamin Becker (Italy) Daniele Bracciali	(Russia) Teymuraz Gabashvili (Germany) Dustin Brown	(Canada) Frank Dancevic (Germany) Benjamin Becker (Croatia) Nikola Mektić (France) Pierre-Hugues Herbert
4 November	Knoxville Challenger; Knoxville, United States; Regular series $50,000 – hard (indoor) – 32S/32Q/16D; Singles – Doubles	(United States) Tim Smyczek; 6–4, 6–2	(Canada) Peter Polansky	(United States) Tennys Sandgren (Zimbabwe) Takanyi Garanganga	(United States) Alex Kuznetsov (United States) Michael Russell (India) Sanam Singh (South Africa) Rik de Voest
4 November	Knoxville Challenger; Knoxville, United States; Regular series $50,000 – hard (indoor) – 32S/32Q/16D; Singles – Doubles	(Australia) Samuel Groth (Australia) John-Patrick Smith; 6–7^{(6–8)}, 6–2, [10–7]	(Australia) Carsten Ball (Canada) Peter Polansky	(United States) Tennys Sandgren (Zimbabwe) Takanyi Garanganga	(United States) Alex Kuznetsov (United States) Michael Russell (India) Sanam Singh (South Africa) Rik de Voest
4 November	Yeongwol Challenger Tennis; Yeongwol, South Korea; Regular series €35,000+H – hard – 32S/32Q/16D; Singles – Doubles	(United States) Bradley Klahn; 7–6^{(7–5)}, 6–2	(Japan) Taro Daniel	(China) Di Wu (Republic of Ireland) James McGee	(South Korea) Lim Yong-Kyu (Belgium) Germain Gigounon (Australia) Matt Reid (Spain) Enrique López Pérez
4 November	Yeongwol Challenger Tennis; Yeongwol, South Korea; Regular series €35,000+H – hard – 32S/32Q/16D; Singles – Doubles	(Croatia) Marin Draganja (Croatia) Mate Pavić; 6–4, 4–6, [10–7]	(Chinese Taipei) Lee Hsin-han (Chinese Taipei) Peng Hsien-yin	(China) Di Wu (Republic of Ireland) James McGee	(South Korea) Lim Yong-Kyu (Belgium) Germain Gigounon (Australia) Matt Reid (Spain) Enrique López Pérez
11 November	ATP Challenger Tour Finals; São Paulo, Brazil; Regular series €220,000+H – clay – 8S; Singles	(Italy) Filippo Volandri; 4–6, 6–4, 6–2	(Colombia) Alejandro González	(Russia) Teymuraz Gabashvili (Ukraine) Oleksandr Nedovyesov	Round Robin losers (Slovakia) Andrej Martin (Brazil) Guilherme Clezar (Netherlands) Jesse Huta Galung (Romania) Adrian Ungur
11 November	IPP Open; Helsinki, Finland; Regular series $42,500 – hard (indoor) – 32S/32Q/16D; Singles – Doubles	(Finland) Jarkko Nieminen; 6–3, 6–1	(Lithuania) Ričardas Berankis	(Germany) Jan-Lennard Struff (Switzerland) Henri Laaksonen	(Russia) Andrey Kuznetsov (Slovakia) Lukáš Lacko (Ukraine) Illya Marchenko (Belarus) Egor Gerasimov
11 November	IPP Open; Helsinki, Finland; Regular series $42,500 – hard (indoor) – 32S/32Q/16D; Singles – Doubles	(Finland) Henri Kontinen (Finland) Jarkko Nieminen; 7–5, 5–7, [10–5]	(Germany) Dustin Brown (Germany) Philipp Marx	(Germany) Jan-Lennard Struff (Switzerland) Henri Laaksonen	(Russia) Andrey Kuznetsov (Slovakia) Lukáš Lacko (Ukraine) Illya Marchenko (Belarus) Egor Gerasimov
11 November	JSM Challenger of Champaign–Urbana; Champaign, United States; Regular series $50,000 – hard (indoor) – 32S/32Q/16D; Singles – Doubles	(United States) Tennys Sandgren; 3–6, 6–3, 7–6^{(7–5)}	(Australia) Samuel Groth	(United States) Dennis Nevolo (United Kingdom) Daniel Smethurst	(United Kingdom) David Rice (United Kingdom) Joshua Milton (Bulgaria) Dimitar Kutrovsky (Australia) John-Patrick Smith
11 November	JSM Challenger of Champaign–Urbana; Champaign, United States; Regular series $50,000 – hard (indoor) – 32S/32Q/16D; Singles – Doubles	(United Kingdom) Edward Corrie (United Kingdom) Daniel Smethurst; 7–6^{(7–5)}, 0–6, [10–7]	(United States) Austin Krajicek (United States) Tennys Sandgren	(United States) Dennis Nevolo (United Kingdom) Daniel Smethurst	(United Kingdom) David Rice (United Kingdom) Joshua Milton (Bulgaria) Dimitar Kutrovsky (Australia) John-Patrick Smith
11 November	Challenger Ciudad de Guayaquil; Guayaquil, Ecuador; Regular series $50,000+H – clay – 32S/32Q/16D; Singles – Doubles	(Argentina) Leonardo Mayer; 6–4, 7–5	(Portugal) Pedro Sousa	(Italy) Gianluigi Quinzi (Venezuela) David Souto	(Ecuador) Emilio Gómez (Austria) Michael Linzer (Dominican Republic) Víctor Estrella (Ecuador) Giovanni Lapentti
11 November	Challenger Ciudad de Guayaquil; Guayaquil, Ecuador; Regular series $50,000+H – clay – 32S/32Q/16D; Singles – Doubles	(Netherlands) Stephan Fransen (Netherlands) Wesley Koolhof; 1–6, 6–2, [10–5]	(Moldova) Roman Borvanov (Germany) Alexander Satschko	(Italy) Gianluigi Quinzi (Venezuela) David Souto	(Ecuador) Emilio Gómez (Austria) Michael Linzer (Dominican Republic) Víctor Estrella (Ecuador) Giovanni Lapentti
11 November	Lima Challenger; Lima, Peru; Regular series $50,000+H – clay – 32S/32Q/16D; Singles – Doubles	(Argentina) Horacio Zeballos; 6–7^{(4–7)}, 6–3, 6–3	(Argentina) Facundo Bagnis	(Argentina) Martín Alund (Brazil) Ricardo Hocevar	(Argentina) Facundo Argüello (Argentina) Guido Andreozzi (Chile) Christian Garín (Argentina) Guido Pella
11 November	Lima Challenger; Lima, Peru; Regular series $50,000+H – clay – 32S/32Q/16D; Singles – Doubles	(Argentina) Andrés Molteni (Brazil) Fernando Romboli; 6–4, 6–4	(Brazil) Marcelo Demoliner (Peru) Sergio Galdós	(Argentina) Martín Alund (Brazil) Ricardo Hocevar	(Argentina) Facundo Argüello (Argentina) Guido Andreozzi (Chile) Christian Garín (Argentina) Guido Pella
11 November	Keio Challenger; Yokohama, Japan; Regular series $50,000+H – hard – 32S/32Q/16D; Singles – Doubles	(Australia) Matthew Ebden; 2–6, 7–6^{(7–3)}, 6–3	(Japan) Go Soeda	(United States) Bradley Klahn (France) Pierre-Hugues Herbert	(Chinese Taipei) Jimmy Wang (Japan) Tatsuma Ito (Switzerland) Marco Chiudinelli (Croatia) Borna Ćorić
11 November	Keio Challenger; Yokohama, Japan; Regular series $50,000+H – hard – 32S/32Q/16D; Singles – Doubles	(United States) Bradley Klahn (New Zealand) Michael Venus; 7–5, 6–1	(Thailand) Sanchai Ratiwatana (Thailand) Sonchat Ratiwatana	(United States) Bradley Klahn (France) Pierre-Hugues Herbert	(Chinese Taipei) Jimmy Wang (Japan) Tatsuma Ito (Switzerland) Marco Chiudinelli (Croatia) Borna Ćorić
18 November	Internazionali di Tennis Castel del Monte; Andria, Italy; Regular Series €30,000+H – hard (indoor) – 32S/32Q/16D; Singles – Doubles	(Hungary) Márton Fucsovics; 6–3, 6–4	(Germany) Dustin Brown	(Switzerland) Yann Marti (Canada) Frank Dancevic	(Czech Republic) Jan Mertl (Republic of Ireland) Louk Sorensen (Uzbekistan) Farrukh Dustov (Italy) Andrea Arnaboldi
18 November	Internazionali di Tennis Castel del Monte; Andria, Italy; Regular Series €30,000+H – hard (indoor) – 32S/32Q/16D; Singles – Doubles	(Austria) Philipp Oswald (Sweden) Andreas Siljeström; 6–2, 6–3	(Italy) Alessandro Motti (Serbia) Goran Tošić	(Switzerland) Yann Marti (Canada) Frank Dancevic	(Czech Republic) Jan Mertl (Republic of Ireland) Louk Sorensen (Uzbekistan) Farrukh Dustov (Italy) Andrea Arnaboldi
18 November	Dunlop World Challenge; Toyota, Japan; Regular Series €35,000+H – Synthetic (indoor) – 32S/29Q/16D; Singles – Doubles	(Australia) Matthew Ebden; 6–3, 6–2	(Japan) Yūichi Sugita	(Slovenia) Blaž Rola (Australia) Samuel Groth	(Japan) Tatsuma Ito (Australia) Benjamin Mitchell (United Kingdom) James Ward (United States) Jason Jung
18 November	Dunlop World Challenge; Toyota, Japan; Regular Series €35,000+H – Synthetic (indoor) – 32S/29Q/16D; Singles – Doubles	(United States) Chase Buchanan (Slovenia) Blaž Rola; 4–6, 6–3, [10–4]	(New Zealand) Marcus Daniell (New Zealand) Artem Sitak	(Slovenia) Blaž Rola (Australia) Samuel Groth	(Japan) Tatsuma Ito (Australia) Benjamin Mitchell (United Kingdom) James Ward (United States) Jason Jung
18 November	Siberia Cup; Tyumen, Russia; Regular series $35,000+H – hard (indoor) – 32S/29Q/16D; Singles – Doubles	(Kazakhstan) Andrey Golubev; 6–4, 6–3	(Russia) Andrey Kuznetsov	(Russia) Teymuraz Gabashvili (Ukraine) Illya Marchenko	(Belarus) Aliaksandr Bury (Croatia) Ante Pavić (Belarus) Egor Gerasimov (Russia) Evgeny Donskoy
18 November	Siberia Cup; Tyumen, Russia; Regular series $35,000+H – hard (indoor) – 32S/29Q/16D; Singles – Doubles	(Belarus) Sergey Betov (Belarus) Aliaksandr Bury; 6–4, 6–2	(Ukraine) Ivan Anikanov (Croatia) Ante Pavić	(Russia) Teymuraz Gabashvili (Ukraine) Illya Marchenko	(Belarus) Aliaksandr Bury (Croatia) Ante Pavić (Belarus) Egor Gerasimov (Russia) Evgeny Donskoy

== Statistical information ==
These tables present the number of singles (S) and doubles (D) titles won by each player and each nation during the season. The players/nations are sorted by: 1) total number of titles (a doubles title won by two players representing the same nation counts as only one win for the nation); 2) a singles > doubles hierarchy; 3) alphabetical order (by family names for players).

To avoid confusion and double counting, these tables should be updated only after an event is completed.

- As of 18 November 2013

=== Titles won by player ===
Total	Player	S	D	S	D
9	Marin Draganja (CRO)		● ● ● ● ● ● ● ● ●	0	9
6	Mate Pavić (CRO)		● ● ● ● ● ●	0	6
6	John-Patrick Smith (AUS)		● ● ● ● ● ●	0	6
5	Jesse Huta Galung (NED)	● ● ● ●	●	4	1
5	Oleksandr Nedovyesov (UKR)	● ● ●	● ●	3	2
5	Samuel Groth (AUS)		● ● ● ● ●	0	5
5	Rameez Junaid (AUS)		● ● ● ● ●	0	5
4	Pablo Carreño (ESP)	● ● ● ●		4	0
4	Dudi Sela (ISR)	● ● ●	●	3	1
4	Alejandro González (COL)	● ● ●	●	3	1
4	Teymuraz Gabashvili (RUS)	● ●	● ●	2	2
4	Bradley Klahn (USA)	● ●	● ●	2	2
4	Marcelo Demoliner (BRA)		● ● ● ●	0	4
4	Máximo González (ARG)		● ● ● ●	0	4
4	Oliver Marach (AUT)		● ● ● ●	0	4
4	Dominik Meffert (GER)		● ● ● ●	0	4
4	Philipp Oswald (AUT)		● ● ● ●	0	4
4	Ken Skupski (GBR)		● ● ● ●	0	4
4	Neal Skupski (GBR)		● ● ● ●	0	4
3	Matthew Ebden (AUS)	● ● ●		3	0
3	Andreas Haider-Maurer (AUT)	● ● ●		3	0
3	Mikhail Kukushkin (KAZ)	● ● ●		3	0
3	Julian Reister (GER)	● ● ●		3	0
3	Radek Štěpánek (CZE)	● ● ●		3	0
3	Jiří Veselý (CZE)	● ● ●		3	0
3	Filippo Volandri (ITA)	● ● ●		3	0
3	Donald Young (USA)	● ● ●		3	0
3	Facundo Bagnis (ARG)	● ●	●	2	1
3	Federico Delbonis (ARG)	● ●	●	2	1
3	Alex Kuznetsov (USA)	● ●	●	2	1
3	Andrej Martin (SVK)	● ●	●	2	1
3	Guido Andreozzi (ARG)	●	● ●	1	2
3	Peter Polansky (CAN)	●	● ●	1	2
3	Tennys Sandgren (USA)	●	● ●	1	2
3	João Souza (BRA)	●	● ●	1	2
3	Farrukh Dustov (UZB)		● ● ●	0	3
3	Sergio Galdós (PER)		● ● ●	0	3
3	Pierre-Hugues Herbert (FRA)		● ● ●	0	3
3	Henri Kontinen (FIN)		● ● ●	0	3
3	Austin Krajicek (USA)		● ● ●	0	3
3	Peng Hsien-yin (TPE)		● ● ●	0	3
3	Sanchai Ratiwatana (THA)		● ● ●	0	3
3	Sonchat Ratiwatana (THA)		● ● ●	0	3
3	Matt Reid (AUS)		● ● ●	0	3
3	Franko Škugor (CRO)		● ● ●	0	3
3	Michael Venus (NZL)		● ● ●	0	3
2	Benjamin Becker (GER)	● ●		2	0
2	Aljaž Bedene (SVN)	● ●		2	0
2	Michael Berrer (GER)	● ●		2	0
2	Alex Bogomolov Jr. (RUS)	● ●		2	0
2	Victor Estrella Burgos (DOM)	● ●		2	0
2	Daniel Gimeno Traver (ESP)	● ●		2	0
2	Dušan Lajović (SRB)	● ●		2	0
2	Lu Yen-Hsun (TPE)	● ●		2	0
2	Adrian Mannarino (FRA)	● ●		2	0
2	John Millman (AUS)	● ●		2	0
2	Vasek Pospisil (CAN)	● ●		2	0
2	Michael Russell (USA)	● ●		2	0
2	João Sousa (POR)	● ●		2	0
2	Dominic Thiem (AUT)	● ●		2	0
2	Adrian Ungur (ROU)	● ●		2	0
2	Horacio Zeballos (ARG)	● ●		2	0
2	Yuki Bhambri (IND)	●	●	1	1
2	Dustin Brown (GER)	●	●	1	1
2	Pablo Cuevas (URU)	●	●	1	1
2	Frank Dancevic (CAN)	●	●	1	1
2	Santiago Giraldo (COL)	●	●	1	1
2	Andrey Golubev (KAZ)	●	●	1	1
2	Malek Jaziri (TUN)	●	●	1	1
2	Steve Johnson (USA)	●	●	1	1
2	Jürgen Melzer (AUT)	●	●	1	1
2	Jarkko Nieminen (FIN)	●	●	1	1
2	Jaroslav Pospíšil (CZE)	●	●	1	1
2	Rajeev Ram (USA)	●	●	1	1
2	Potito Starace (ITA)	●	●	1	1
2	Sergiy Stakhovsky (UKR)	●	●	1	1
2	Rhyne Williams (USA)	●	●	1	1
2	Nicolás Barrientos (COL)		● ●	0	2
2	Juan Sebastián Cabal (COL)		● ●	0	2
2	Victor Baluda (RUS)		● ●	0	2
2	Andreas Beck (GER)		● ●	0	2
2	Tomasz Bednarek (POL)		● ●	0	2
2	Roman Borvanov (MDA)		● ●	0	2
2	Johan Brunström (SWE)		● ●	0	2
2	Chen Ti (TPE)		● ●	0	2
2	James Cluskey (IRL)		● ●	0	2
2	Marco Crugnola (ITA)		● ●	0	2
2	Guillermo Durán (ARG)		● ●	0	2
2	Jonathan Erlich (ISR)		● ●	0	2
2	Jonathan Eysseric (FRA)		● ●	0	2
2	Claudio Grassi (ITA)		● ●	0	2
2	Riccardo Ghedin (ITA)		● ●	0	2
2	Chris Guccione (AUS)		● ●	0	2
2	Christopher Kas (GER)		● ●	0	2
2	Raven Klaasen (RSA)		● ●	0	2
2	Lee Hsin-han (TPE)		● ●	0	2
2	Fabrice Martin (FRA)		● ●	0	2
2	Toshihide Matsui (JPN)		● ●	0	2
2	Florin Mergea (ROU)		● ●	0	2
2	Nicholas Monroe (USA)		● ●	0	2
2	Tim Puetz (GER)		● ●	0	2
2	Andy Ram (ISR)		● ●	0	2
2	Nicolas Renavand (FRA)		● ●	0	2
2	Fernando Romboli (BRA)		● ●	0	2
2	Eduardo Schwank (ARG)		● ●	0	2
2	Andreas Siljeström (SWE)		● ●	0	2
2	Simon Stadler (GER)		● ●	0	2
2	Goran Tošić (SRB)		● ●	0	2
2	Antal van der Duim (NED)		● ●	0	2
2	Boy Westerhof (NED)		● ●	0	2
2	Igor Zelenay (SVK)		● ●	0	2
2	Radu Albot (MDA)	●	●	1	1
1	Facundo Argüello (ARG)	●		1	0
1	Matthew Barton (AUS)	●		1	0
1	Thomaz Bellucci (BRA)	●		1	0
1	Paul Capdeville (CHI)	●		1	0
1	Marco Cecchinato (ITA)	●		1	0
1	Guilherme Clezar (BRA)	●		1	0
1	Marius Copil (ROU)	●		1	0
1	Rik de Voest (RSA)	●		1	0
1	Alessio di Mauro (ITA)	●		1	0
1	Rogério Dutra da Silva (BRA)	●		1	0
1	Gastão Elias (POR)	●		1	0
1	Thomas Fabbiano (ITA)	●		1	0
1	Márton Fucsovics (HUN)	●		1	0
1	Marc Gicquel (FRA)	●		1	0
1	David Goffin (BEL)	●		1	0
1	Jan Hájek (CZE)	●		1	0
1	Ryan Harrison (USA)	●		1	0
1	Tobias Kamke (GER)	●		1	0
1	Blaž Kavčič (SLO)	●		1	0
1	Denis Kudla (USA)	●		1	0
1	Nick Kyrgios (AUS)	●		1	0
1	Lukáš Lacko (SVK)	●		1	0
1	Nicolas Mahut (FRA)	●		1	0
1	Florian Mayer (GER)	●		1	0
1	Leonardo Mayer (ARG)	●		1	0
1	Gaël Monfils (FRA)	●		1	0
1	Benoît Paire (FRA)	●		1	0
1	Guido Pella (ARG)	●		1	0
1	Michał Przysiężny (POL)	●		1	0
1	Rubén Ramírez Hidalgo (ESP)	●		1	0
1	Pere Riba (ESP)	●		1	0
1	Guillaume Rufin (FRA)	●		1	0
1	Andreas Seppi (ITA)	●		1	0
1	Tim Smyczek (USA)	●		1	0
1	Jack Sock (USA)	●		1	0
1	Go Soeda (JPN)	●		1	0
1	Cedrik-Marcel Stebe (GER)	●		1	0
1	Yūichi Sugita (JPN)	●		1	0
1	Agustín Velotti (ARG)	●		1	0
1	James Ward (GRB)	●		1	0
1	Grega Žemlja (SVN)	●		1	0
1	Ryan Agar (AUS)		●	0	1
1	Jorge Aguilar (CHI)		●	0	1
1	Prakash Amritraj (IND)		●	0	1
1	Marcelo Arévalo (ESA)		●	0	1
1	Carsten Ball (AUS)		●	0	1
1	Mirza Bašić (BIH)		●	0	1
1	Karol Beck (SVK)		●	0	1
1	Andre Begemann (GER)		●	0	1
1	Ilija Bozoljac (SRB)		●	0	1
1	Daniele Bracciali (ITA)		●	0	1
1	Tomislav Brkić (BIH)		●	0	1
1	Kamil Čapkovič (SVK)		●	0	1
1	James Cerretani (USA)		●	0	1
1	Pavol Červenák (SVK)		●	0	1
1	Erik Chvojka (CAN)		●	0	1
1	Nikola Ćirić (SRB)		●	0	1
1	Edward Corrie (GBR)		●	0	1
1	Pablo Cuevas (URU)		●	0	1
1	Steve Darcis (BEL)		●	0	1
1	Thiemo de Bakker (NED)		●	0	1
1	Jamie Delgado (GBR)		●	0	1
1	Somdev Devvarman (IND)		●	0	1
1	James Duckworth (AUS)		●	0	1
1	Fabiano de Paula (BRA)		●	0	1
1	Colin Ebelthite (AUS)		●	0	1
1	Mikhail Elgin (RUS)		●	0	1
1	Martin Emmrich (GER)		●	0	1
1	Robert Farah (COL)		●	0	1
1	Adam Feeney (AUS)		●	0	1
1	Martin Fischer (AUT)		●	0	1
1	Stephan Fransen (NED)		●	0	1
1	Alessandro Giannessi (ITA)		●	0	1
1	Daniele Giorgini (ITA)		●	0	1
1	Emilio Gómez (ECU)		●	0	1
1	Gerard Granollers (ESP)		●	0	1
1	Huang Liang-Chi (TPE)		●	0	1
1	Stefano Ianni (ITA)		●	0	1
1	Jordan Kerr (AUS)		●	0	1
1	Kevin King (USA)		●	0	1
1	Brydan Klein (AUS)		●	0	1
1	Thanasi Kokkinakis (AUS)		●	0	1
1	Wesley Koolhof (NED)		●	0	1
1	Evgeny Korolev (KAZ)		●	0	1
1	Mateusz Kowalczyk (POL)		●	0	1
1	Konstantin Kravchuk (RUS)		●	0	1
1	Gero Kretschmer (GER)		●	0	1
1	Dino Marcan (CRO)		●	0	1
1	Illya Marchenko (UKR)		●	0	1
1	Philipp Marx (GER)		●	0	1
1	Nikola Mektić (CRO)		●	0	1
1	Adrián Menéndez Maceiras (ESP)		●	0	1
1	Benjamin Mitchell (AUS)		●	0	1
1	Denys Molchanov (UKR)		●	0	1
1	Andrés Molteni (ARG)		●	0	1
1	Frank Moser (GER)		●	0	1
1	Alessandro Motti (ITA)		●	0	1
1	Jamie Murray (GBR)		●	0	1
1	Gianluca Naso (ITA)		●	0	1
1	Maximilian Neuchrist (AUT)		●	0	1
1	Hugo Nys (FRA)		●	0	1
1	Guillermo Olaso (ESP)		●	0	1
1	Albano Olivetti (FRA)		●	0	1
1	John Peers (AUS)		●	0	1
1	Philipp Petzschner (GER)		●	0	1
1	Dane Propoggia (AUS)		●	0	1
1	Purav Raja (IND)		●	0	1
1	Bobby Reynolds (USA)		●	0	1
1	Stéphane Robert (FRA)		●	0	1
1	Olivier Rochus (BEL)		●	0	1
1	Cristian Rodríguez (COL)		●	0	1
1	Ruan Roelofse (RSA)		●	0	1
1	André Sá (BRA)		●	0	1
1	Carlos Salamanca (COL)		●	0	1
1	Jordi Samper-Montaña (ESP)		●	0	1
1	Alexander Satschko (GER)		●	0	1
1	Diego Sebastián Schwartzman (ARG)		●	0	1
1	Adil Shamasdin (CAN)		●	0	1
1	Divij Sharan (IND)		●	0	1
1	Igor Sijsling (NED)		●	0	1
1	Artem Sitak (NZL)		●	0	1
1	Daniel Smethurst (GBR)		●	0	1
1	Tim Smyczek (USA)		●	0	1
1	Juan Carlos Spir (COL)		●	0	1
1	Eduardo Struvay (COL)		●	0	1
1	Maxime Teixeira (FRA)		●	0	1
1	Marco Trungelliti (ARG)		●	0	1
1	Danai Udomchoke (THA)		●	0	1
1	Simone Vagnozzi (ITA)		●	0	1
1	Antonio Veić (CRO)		●	0	1
1	Matteo Viola (ITA)		●	0	1
1	Jimmy Wang (TPE)		●	0	1
1	Yang Tsung-hua (TPE)		●	0	1
1	Mischa Zverev (GER)		●	0	1

=== Titles won by nation ===
Total	Nation	S	D
28	United States	18	10
28	Australia	7	21
27	Germany	11	16
24	Argentina	13	11
17	Austria	6	11
16	Italy	7	9
15	France	7	8
12	Croatia	0	12
11	Czech Republic	9	2
11	Spain	8	3
11	Brazil	4	7
10	Colombia	4	6
9	Netherlands	4	5
9	Ukraine	4	5
8	Russia	4	4
8	Taiwan	2	6
8	Great Britain	1	7
7	Canada	4	3
7	Israel	4	3
6	India	1	5
5	Kazakhstan	4	1
5	Romania	3	2
5	Serbia	2	3
5	Slovakia	2	3
5	Sweden	0	5
4	Slovenia	4	0
4	Japan	2	2
4	Finland	1	3
4	Moldova	1	3
4	South Africa	1	3
4	New Zealand	0	4
4	Thailand	0	4
3	Portugal	3	0
3	Poland	1	2
3	Peru	0	3
3	Uzbekistan	0	3
2	Dominican Republic	2	0
2	Belgium	1	1
2	Chile	1	1
2	Uruguay	1	1
2	Tunisia	1	1
2	Ireland	0	2
1	Hungary	1	0
1	Bosnia and Herzegovina	0	1
1	Ecuador	0	1
1	El Salvador	0	1

=== Year-to-date Challenger rankings ===
Year-To-Date Challenger Rankings, as of 14 October 2013
#	Player	Points	Move	Tours
1	Dudi Sela (ISR)	534	▲5	14
2	Jiří Veselý (CZE)	484	▼1	10
3	Alejandro González (COL)	470	▲2	17
4	Pablo Carreño (ESP)	462	▼2	12
5	Jesse Huta Galung (NED)	462	▼2	15
6	Filippo Volandri (ITA)	440	▼2	11
7	Teymuraz Gabashvili (RUS)	438	▲3	21
8	Mikhail Kukushkin (KAZ)	417	▼1	14
9	Oleksandr Nedovyesov (UKR)	395	▼1	22
10	Adrian Ungur (ROU)	383	▼1	14
11	Andrej Martin (SVK)	383	▲1	23
12	Radek Štěpánek (CZE)	375	▼1	3
13	Donald Young (USA)	370	▲3	14
14	Marc Gicquel (FRA)	359	▲5	14
15	Adrian Mannarino (FRA)	357	▼2	13
16	Andreas Haider-Maurer (AUT)	357	▼2	15
17	Facundo Bagnis (ARG)	355	Steady	17
18	Pere Riba (ESP)	353	▼3	13
19	Matthew Ebden (AUS)	351	▲12	11
20	Diego Sebastián Schwartzman (ARG)	347	▲6	17

== Point distribution ==
Points are awarded as follows:

Tournament Category	W	F	SF	QF	R16	R32	Q
Challenger Tour Finals	RR+50	RR+30	15 per round robin win				
Challenger $125,000+H; Challenger €106,500+H	125	75	45	25	10	0	+5
Challenger $125,000; Challenger €106,500	110	65	40	20	9	0	+5
Challenger $100,000; Challenger €85,000	100	60	35	18	8	0	+5
Challenger $75,000; Challenger €64,000	90	55	33	17	8	0	+5
Challenger $50,000; Challenger €42,500	80	48	29	15	7	0	+3
Challenger $40,000+H; Challenger €35,000+H	80	48	29	15	6	0	+3

== See also ==
- International Tennis Federation
