= 2021 Tennis Napoli Cup – Doubles =

Doubles
- 2021 Tennis Napoli Cup

Final
- Champions: (Germany) Dustin Brown (Italy) Andrea Vavassori
- Runners-up: (Bosnia and Herzegovina) Mirza Bašić (Croatia) Nino Serdarušić
- Score: 7–5, 7–6^{(7–5)}

Events
Singles	Doubles
← 2016 ·	Tennis Napoli Cup	· 2022 →

Gero Kretschmer and Alexander Satschko were the defending champions but chose not to defend their title.

Dustin Brown and Andrea Vavassori won the title after defeating Mirza Bašić and Nino Serdarušić 7–5, 7–6^{(7–5)} in the final.

== Seeds ==
1. (Germany) Dustin Brown / (Italy) Andrea Vavassori (champions)
2. (France) Sadio Doumbia / (France) Fabien Reboul (quarterfinals)
3. (United States) James Cerretani / (Germany) Fabian Fallert (quarterfinals)
4. (Germany) Yannick Hanfmann / (Switzerland) Luca Margaroli (quarterfinals)

== Draw ==
=== Key ===
- Q = Qualifier
- WC = Wild card
- LL = Lucky loser
- Alt = Alternate
- ITF = ITF entry
- PR = Protected ranking
- SR = Special ranking
- SE = Special exempt
- JE = Junior exempt
- JR = Junior Accelerator Programme entrant
- CO = College Accelerator Programme entrant
- NG = Next Gen Accelerator Program entrant
- w/o = Walkover
- r = Retired
- d = Defaulted

First round
1	(Germany) D Brown (Italy) A Vavassori	6	6
(Romania) VV Cornea (Greece) Pe Tsitsipas	2	2
(Netherlands) T Griekspoor (Netherlands) B Stevens	6	6
Alt	(Croatia) D Ajduković (Croatia) F Ninčević	3	0
(Bosnia and Herzegovina) M Bašić (Croatia) N Serdarušić	6	6
WC	(Italy) M Arnaldi (Italy) Lorenzo Peluso	2	4
(Italy) J Berrettini (Italy) R Brancaccio	3	7^{7}	[6]
3	(United States) J Cerretani (Germany) F Fallert	6	6^{5}	[10]
(Slovakia) A Martin (Austria) T-S Weissborn	6	6
(Italy) GM Moroni (Italy) A Pellegrino	3	3
WC	(Italy) F Cobolli (Italy) M Gigante	3	3
2	(France) S Doumbia (France) F Reboul	6	6

Quarterfinals
1	(Germany) D Brown (Italy) A Vavassori	6	7^{7}
PR	(Italy) F Baldi (Italy) J Ocleppo	4	6^{5}
4	(Germany) Y Hanfmann (Switzerland) L Margaroli	2	5
(Netherlands) T Griekspoor (Netherlands) B Stevens	6	7
(Bosnia and Herzegovina) M Bašić (Croatia) N Serdarušić	6	6
3	(United States) J Cerretani (Germany) F Fallert	4	4
(Slovakia) A Martin (Austria) T-S Weissborn	7	2	[10]
2	(France) S Doumbia (France) F Reboul	5	6	[7]

Semifinals
1	(Germany) D Brown (Italy) A Vavassori	6	6
(Netherlands) T Griekspoor (Netherlands) B Stevens	3	4
(Bosnia and Herzegovina) M Bašić (Croatia) N Serdarušić	7^{7}	7
(Slovakia) A Martin (Austria) T-S Weissborn	6^{4}	5

Final
1	(Germany) D Brown (Italy) A Vavassori	7	7^{7}
(Bosnia and Herzegovina) M Bašić (Croatia) N Serdarušić	5	6^{5}
