= 2015 Tennis Napoli Cup – Singles =

Singles
- 2015 Tennis Napoli Cup

Final
- Champion: (Spain) Daniel Muñoz de la Nava
- Runner-up: (Italy) Matteo Donati
- Score: 6–2, 6–1

Events
Singles	Doubles
← 2013 ·	Tennis Napoli Cup	· 2016 →

Potito Starace won the event the last time it was played, in 2013. This year, he lost in the first round.

Daniel Muñoz de la Nava won the title, defeating Matteo Donati in the final, 6–2, 6–1.

== Seeds ==
1. (Kazakhstan) Andrey Golubev (second round)
2. (Serbia) Filip Krajinović (second round)
3. (Slovenia) Blaž Rola (first round)
4. (Spain) Albert Montañés (first round, retired)
5. (Netherlands) Thiemo de Bakker (first round)
6. (Slovakia) Norbert Gombos (second round)
7. (Hungary) Márton Fucsovics (first round)
8. (Italy) Marco Cecchinato (semifinals)

== Draw ==
=== Key ===
- Q = Qualifier
- WC = Wild card
- LL = Lucky loser
- Alt = Alternate
- SE = Special exempt
- PR = Protected ranking
- ITF = ITF entry
- JE = Junior exempt
- w/o = Walkover
- r = Retired
- d = Defaulted
- SR = Special ranking

=== Finals ===
Semifinals
WC	(Italy) Matteo Donati	7^{7}	6
8	(Italy) Marco Cecchinato	6^{5}	2
Q	(Italy) Thomas Fabbiano	0	5
(Spain) Daniel Muñoz de la Nava	6	7

Final
WC	(Italy) Matteo Donati	2	1
(Spain) Daniel Muñoz de la Nava	6	6

=== Top half ===
First round
1	(Kazakhstan) A Golubev	6	6
(France) L Lokoli	1	0
(France) A Michon	2	2
WC	(Italy) M Donati	6	6
(Italy) R Marcora	6	4	3
WC	(Italy) F Volandri	3	6	6
(Italy) A Arnaboldi	6	3	6
5	(Netherlands) T de Bakker	2	6	3
3	(Slovenia) B Rola	3	1
WC	(Italy) G Quinzi	6	6
(Slovakia) J Kovalík	6^{6}	4
Q	(Italy) F Cipolla	7^{8}	6
(Estonia) J Zopp	6	6
(Bosnia and Herzegovina) A Šetkić	4	3
(France) E Couacaud	1	3
8	(Italy) M Cecchinato	6	6

Second round
1	(Kazakhstan) A Golubev	7^{7}	4	2
WC	(Italy) M Donati	6^{3}	6	6
WC	(Italy) F Volandri	5	7	4
(Italy) A Arnaboldi	7	5	6
WC	(Italy) G Quinzi	7^{9}	7
Q	(Italy) F Cipolla	6^{7}	5
(Estonia) J Zopp	6	3	6^{10}
8	(Italy) M Cecchinato	4	6	7^{12}

Quarterfinals
WC	(Italy) M Donati	7^{7}	4	7^{7}
(Italy) A Arnaboldi	6^{2}	6	6^{1}
WC	(Italy) G Quinzi	7^{7}	2	6^{4}
8	(Italy) M Cecchinato	6^{5}	6	7^{7}

Semifinals
WC	(Italy) M Donati	7^{7}	6
8	(Italy) M Cecchinato	6^{5}	2

=== Bottom half ===
First round
6	(Slovakia) N Gombos	6	7
(Italy) M Viola	3	5
Q	(Italy) T Fabbiano	5
(Romania) A Ungur	3^{r}
Q	(France) A Musialek	6^{2}	6^{0}
(Georgia (country)) N Basilashvili	7^{7}	7^{7}
(Spain) R Carballés Baena	6	4
4	(Spain) A Montañés	1	3^{r}
7	(Hungary) M Fucsovics	4	4
(Spain) D Muñoz de la Nava	6	6
(Slovakia) A Martin	4	5
WC	(Italy) F Gaio	6	7
(Spain) R Ramírez Hidalgo	6	6
Q	(Monaco) B Balleret	4	0
(Italy) P Starace	6	6^{4}	2
2	(Serbia) F Krajinović	3	7^{7}	6

Second round
6	(Slovakia) N Gombos	5	3
Q	(Italy) T Fabbiano	7	6
(Georgia (country)) N Basilashvili	6	2	7^{7}
(Spain) R Carballés Baena	3	6	6^{4}
(Spain) D Muñoz de la Nava	6	5	6
WC	(Italy) F Gaio	2	7	2
(Spain) R Ramírez Hidalgo	6	6
2	(Serbia) F Krajinović	2	2

Quarterfinals
Q	(Italy) T Fabbiano	6	5	6
(Georgia (country)) N Basilashvili	1	7	2
(Spain) D Muñoz de la Nava	6	6
(Spain) R Ramírez Hidalgo	4	0

Semifinals
Q	(Italy) T Fabbiano	0	5
(Spain) D Muñoz de la Nava	6	7
