= 2015 Tennis Napoli Cup – Doubles =

Doubles
- 2015 Tennis Napoli Cup

Final
- Champions: (Serbia) Ilija Bozoljac (Serbia) Filip Krajinović
- Runners-up: (Georgia (country)) Nikoloz Basilashvili (Belarus) Alexander Bury
- Score: 6–1, 6–2

Events
Singles	Doubles
← 2013 ·	Tennis Napoli Cup	· 2016 →

Stefano Ianni and Potito Starace won the event the last time it was played, in 2013, but Ianni did not participate. Starace partnered with Adrian Ungur, but they lost to Dino Marcan and Blaž Rola in the first round.

Ilija Bozoljac and Filip Krajinović won the title, defeating Nikoloz Basilashvili and Alexander Bury in the final, 6–1, 6–2.

== Seeds ==
1. (Germany) Gero Kretschmer / (Germany) Alexander Satschko (semifinals)
2. (China) Gong Maoxin / (Chinese Taipei) Peng Hsien-yin (first round)
3. (Poland) Mateusz Kowalczyk / (Slovakia) Igor Zelenay (quarterfinals)
4. (Italy) Potito Starace / (Romania) Adrian Ungur (first round)

== Draw ==
=== Key ===
- Q = Qualifier
- WC = Wild card
- LL = Lucky loser
- Alt = Alternate
- SE = Special exempt
- PR = Protected ranking
- ITF = ITF entry
- JE = Junior exempt
- w/o = Walkover
- r = Retired
- d = Defaulted
- SR = Special ranking

=== Draw ===
First round
1	(Germany) G Kretschmer (Germany) A Satschko	6	6
(Spain) R Carballés Baena (Italy) C Grassi	1	2
(Monaco) R Arneodo (Monaco) B Balleret	5	3
(Slovakia) N Gombos (Slovakia) A Martin	7	6
3	(Poland) M Kowalczyk (Slovakia) I Zelenay	6	7
WC	(Italy) G Mager (Italy) G Quinzi	3	5
(Serbia) I Bozoljac (Serbia) F Krajinović	6	6
WC	(Italy) M Donati (Kazakhstan) A Golubev	3	4
(Chinese Taipei) H-h Lee (Italy) A Motti	6	7
(Italy) M Cecchinato (Italy) M Viola	3	5
(Croatia) D Marcan (Slovenia) B Rola	6	6
4	(Italy) P Starace (Romania) A Ungur	4	2
(Belarus) S Betov (Russia) M Elgin	6	6
WC	(Italy) S Caruso (Italy) Pietro Rondoni	1	3
(Georgia (country)) N Basilashvili (Belarus) A Bury	6	6
2	(China) M-x Gong (Chinese Taipei) H-y Peng	2	4

Quarterfinals
1	(Germany) G Kretschmer (Germany) A Satschko	6	6
(Slovakia) N Gombos (Slovakia) A Martin	1	4
3	(Poland) M Kowalczyk (Slovakia) I Zelenay	7^{7}	4	[11]
(Serbia) I Bozoljac (Serbia) F Krajinović	6^{5}	6	[13]
(Chinese Taipei) H-h Lee (Italy) A Motti	7	3	[10]
(Croatia) D Marcan (Slovenia) B Rola	5	6	[8]
(Belarus) S Betov (Russia) M Elgin	6^{3}	6	[9]
(Georgia (country)) N Basilashvili (Belarus) A Bury	7^{7}	3	[11]

Semifinals
1	(Germany) G Kretschmer (Germany) A Satschko	5	6	[5]
(Serbia) I Bozoljac (Serbia) F Krajinović	7	3	[10]
(Chinese Taipei) H-h Lee (Italy) A Motti	4	5
(Georgia (country)) N Basilashvili (Belarus) A Bury	6	7

Final
(Serbia) I Bozoljac (Serbia) F Krajinović	6	6
(Georgia (country)) N Basilashvili (Belarus) A Bury	1	2
