= 2025 Napoli Tennis Cup – Singles =

Singles
- 2025 Napoli Tennis Cup

Final
- Champion: (Czech Republic) Vít Kopřiva
- Runner-up: (Italy) Luciano Darderi
- Score: 3–6, 6–3, 7–6^{(7–4)}

Events
| Singles | Doubles |
| ← 2024 · | Napoli Tennis Cup | · 2026 → |

Luca Nardi was the defending champion but chose not to defend his title.

Vít Kopřiva won the title after defeating Luciano Darderi 3–6, 6–3, 7–6^{(7–4)} in the final.

== Seeds ==
1. (Italy) Luciano Darderi (final)
2. (Belgium) Raphaël Collignon (first round)
3. (Italy) Francesco Passaro (first round)
4. (Brazil) Thiago Seyboth Wild (first round)
5. (Italy) Fabio Fognini (first round)
6. (United States) Tristan Boyer (first round)
7. (Croatia) Borna Ćorić (second round)
8. (Chinese Taipei) Tseng Chun-hsin (second round)

== Draw ==
=== Key ===
- Q = Qualifier
- WC = Wild card
- LL = Lucky loser
- Alt = Alternate
- ITF = ITF entry
- PR = Protected ranking
- SR = Special ranking
- SE = Special exempt
- JE = Junior exempt
- JR = Junior Accelerator Programme entrant
- CO = College Accelerator Programme entrant
- NG = Next Gen Accelerator Program entrant
- w/o = Walkover
- r = Retired
- d = Defaulted

=== Finals ===
Semifinals
1 | (Italy) Luciano Darderi | 1 | 6 | 7
(Czech Republic) Dalibor Svrčina | 6 | 2 | 5
Q | (Italy) Andrea Pellegrino | 5 | 3
(Czech Republic) Vít Kopřiva | 7 | 6

Final
1 | (Italy) Luciano Darderi | 6 | 3 | 6^{4}
(Czech Republic) Vít Kopřiva | 3 | 6 | 7^{7}

=== Top half ===
First round
1 | (Italy) L Darderi | 6 | 6
Q | (Italy) F Agamenone | 2 | 3
(Croatia) D Ajduković | 6^{6} | 4
(India) S Nagal | 7^{8} | 6
(Switzerland) S Wawrinka | 6 | 6
Q | (Croatia) B Gojo | 2 | 3
(France) H Mayot | 4 | 2
7 | (Croatia) B Ćorić | 6 | 6
3 | (Italy) F Passaro | 7^{8} | 3 | 5
Q | (Sweden) E Ymer | 6^{6} | 6 | 7
WC | (Italy) F Maestrelli | 3 | 4
(Bolivia) M Dellien | 6 | 6
Q | (Italy) G Fonio | 7^{7} | 2 | 5
(Czech Republic) D Svrčina | 6^{2} | 6 | 7
(France) G Barrère | 4 | 6^{6}
8 | (Chinese Taipei) C-h Tseng | 6 | 7^{8}

Second round
1 | (Italy) L Darderi | 6 | 6
(India) S Nagal | 0 | 1
(Switzerland) S Wawrinka | 6 | 6
7 | (Croatia) B Ćorić | 2 | 3
Q | (Sweden) E Ymer | 6^{4} | 6 | 0
(Bolivia) M Dellien | 7^{7} | 3 | 6
(Czech Republic) D Svrčina | 6 | 7
8 | (Chinese Taipei) C-h Tseng | 3 | 5

Quarterfinals
1 | (Italy) L Darderi | 6 | 6
(Switzerland) S Wawrinka | 3 | 4
(Bolivia) M Dellien | 1 | 3
(Czech Republic) D Svrčina | 6 | 6

Semifinals
1 | (Italy) L Darderi | 1 | 6 | 7
(Czech Republic) D Svrčina | 6 | 2 | 5

=== Bottom half ===
First round
5 | (Italy) F Fognini | 3 | 6 | 5
(Belgium) G Onclin | 6 | 4 | 7
Q | (Italy) A Pellegrino | 6 | 1 | 6
(United Kingdom) D Evans | 3 | 6 | 4
Q | (Czech Republic) H Bartoň | 1 | 5
(France) P-H Herbert | 6 | 7
Alt | (Germany) MH Rehberg | 3 | 6 | 6
4/WC | (Brazil) T Seyboth Wild | 6 | 3 | 4
6 | (United States) T Boyer | 6 | 3 | 5
(Italy) F Arnaboldi | 1 | 6 | 7
WC | (Italy) G Zeppieri | 6 | 1 | 0
Alt | (Romania) FC Jianu | 3 | 6 | 6
(Slovakia) J Kovalík | 5 | 0
(France) C Hemery | 7 | 6
(Czech Republic) V Kopřiva | 6 | 6
2 | (Belgium) R Collignon | 4 | 3

Second round
(Belgium) G Onclin | 5 | 3
Q | (Italy) A Pellegrino | 7 | 6
(France) P-H Herbert | 7 | 6
Alt | (Germany) MH Rehberg | 5 | 4
(Italy) F Arnaboldi | 2 | 6 | 6
Alt | (Romania) FC Jianu | 6 | 1 | 4
(France) C Hemery | 1 | 3
(Czech Republic) V Kopřiva | 6 | 6

Quarterfinals
Q | (Italy) A Pellegrino | 4 | 7^{8} | 6
(France) P-H Herbert | 6 | 6^{6} | 3
(Italy) F Arnaboldi | 3 | 6 | 3
(Czech Republic) V Kopřiva | 6 | 4 | 6

Semifinals
Q | (Italy) A Pellegrino | 5 | 3
(Czech Republic) V Kopřiva | 7 | 6
