= 2012 Tennis Napoli Cup – Doubles =

Doubles
- 2012 Tennis Napoli Cup

Final
- Champions: (Lithuania) Laurynas Grigelis (Italy) Alessandro Motti
- Runners-up: (Australia) Rameez Junaid (Slovakia) Igor Zelenay
- Score: 6–4, 6–4

Events
Singles	Doubles
← 2011 ·	Tennis Napoli Cup	· 2013 →

Travis Rettenmaier and Simon Stadler were the defending champions but decided not to participate.
Laurynas Grigelis and Alessandro Motti won the final 6–4, 6–4 against Rameez Junaid and Igor Zelenay.

== Seeds ==
1. (Australia) Rameez Junaid / (Slovakia) Igor Zelenay (final)
2. (Lithuania) Laurynas Grigelis / (Italy) Alessandro Motti (champion)
3. (Italy) Alessandro Giannessi / (Italy) Stefano Ianni (first round)
4. (Czech Republic) Roman Jebavý / (Czech Republic) Dušan Lojda (first round)

== Draw ==
=== Key ===
- Q = Qualifier
- WC = Wild card
- LL = Lucky loser
- Alt = Alternate
- SE = Special exempt
- PR = Protected ranking
- ITF = ITF entry
- JE = Junior exempt
- w/o = Walkover
- r = Retired
- d = Defaulted
- SR = Special ranking

=== Draw ===
First round
1	(Australia) R Junaid (Slovakia) I Zelenay	6	1	[10]
WC	(Spain) Joaquín Muñoz Bejarano (Netherlands) I Sijsling	0	6	[4]
(Czech Republic) Jan Satral (Slovakia) Adrian Sikora	6	6
(Italy) Marco Cecchinato (Italy) Federico Gaio	3	1
4	(Czech Republic) R Jebavý (Czech Republic) D Lojda	3	3
(Italy) Enrico Burzi (Italy) D Giorgini	6	6
WC	(Italy) Enrico Becuzzi (Italy) Ferruccio Cuomo	1	3
(Italy) T Fabbiano (Italy) M Trevisan	6	6
(Belgium) M Authom (France) R Jouan	6	6
(Switzerland) Adrien Bossel (Netherlands) T Schoorel	2	2
(Belarus) A Bury (United Kingdom) Daniel Smethurst	4	6	[10]
3	(Italy) A Giannessi (Italy) S Ianni	6	1	[6]
(Belgium) Y Mertens (France) M Rodrigues	3	3
WC	(Italy) Enrico Fioravante (Colombia) Cristian Rodríguez	6	6
(Italy) R Bellotti (Italy) Massimo Boscatto	6^{4}	1
2	(Lithuania) L Grigelis (Italy) A Motti	7^{7}	6

Quarterfinals
1	(Australia) R Junaid (Slovakia) I Zelenay	6	6
(Czech Republic) Jan Satral (Slovakia) Adrian Sikora	3	1
(Italy) Enrico Burzi (Italy) D Giorgini	3	2
(Italy) T Fabbiano (Italy) M Trevisan	6	6
(Belgium) M Authom (France) R Jouan	7^{11}	6
(Belarus) A Bury (United Kingdom) Daniel Smethurst	6^{9}	2
WC	(Italy) Enrico Fioravante (Colombia) Cristian Rodríguez	6	6^{7}	[7]
2	(Lithuania) L Grigelis (Italy) A Motti	4	7^{9}	[10]

Semifinals
1	(Australia) R Junaid (Slovakia) I Zelenay	6	6
(Italy) T Fabbiano (Italy) M Trevisan	3	4
(Belgium) M Authom (France) R Jouan	6^{8}	6	[7]
2	(Lithuania) L Grigelis (Italy) A Motti	7^{10}	4	[10]

Final
1	(Australia) R Junaid (Slovakia) I Zelenay	4	4
2	(Lithuania) L Grigelis (Italy) A Motti	6	6
