= 2024 Tennis Napoli Cup – Doubles =

Doubles
- 2024 Tennis Napoli Cup

Final
- Champions: (Argentina) Guido Andreozzi (Mexico) Miguel Ángel Reyes-Varela
- Runners-up: (France) Théo Arribagé (Romania) Victor Vlad Cornea
- Score: 6–4, 1–6, [10–7]

Events
Singles	Doubles
← 2022 ·	Tennis Napoli Cup	· 2025 →

Ivan Dodig and Austin Krajicek were the defending champions but chose not to defend their title.

Guido Andreozzi and Miguel Ángel Reyes-Varela won the title after defeating Théo Arribagé and Victor Vlad Cornea 6–4, 1–6, [10–7] in the final.

== Seeds ==
1. (Colombia) Nicolás Barrientos / (Brazil) Rafael Matos (first round)
2. (Monaco) Romain Arneodo / (Austria) Sam Weissborn (semifinals)
3. (Germany) Constantin Frantzen / (Germany) Hendrik Jebens (first round)
4. (Serbia) Nikola Ćaćić / (Ukraine) Denys Molchanov (first round)

== Draw ==
Key

- Q = Qualifier
- WC = Wild card
- LL = Lucky loser
- Alt = Alternate
- ITF = ITF entry
- PR = Protected ranking
- SR = Special ranking
- SE = Special exempt
- JE = Junior exempt
- JR = Junior Accelerator Programme entrant
- CO = College Accelerator Programme entrant
- NG = Next Gen Accelerator Program entrant
- w/o = Walkover
- r = Retired
- d = Defaulted

=== Draw ===
First round
1	(Colombia) N Barrientos (Brazil) R Matos	3	4
(Czech Republic) P Nouza (Czech Republic) P Rikl	6	6
(Ecuador) D Hidalgo (Colombia) C Rodríguez	4	2
(France) M Guinard (France) G Jacq	6	6
3	(Germany) C Frantzen (Germany) H Jebens	6	6^{1}	[6]
(Argentina) G Andreozzi (Mexico) MÁ Reyes-Varela	4	7^{7}	[10]
Alt	(Italy) M Cecchinato (Italy) S Travaglia	2	3
(Czech Republic) R Jebavý (Austria) P Oswald	6	6
(France) T Arribagé (Romania) VV Cornea	6^{7}	6	[10]
WC	(Italy) E Dalla Valle (Italy) L Rottoli	7^{9}	3	[2]
(India) A Kadhe (India) J Nedunchezhiyan	6	7^{7}
4	(Serbia) N Ćaćić (Ukraine) D Molchanov	4	6^{5}
I Liutarevich (Ukraine) V Manafov	7^{7}	6^{2}	[10]
WC	(Italy) F Maestrelli (Italy) L Nardi	6^{2}	7^{7}	[8]
(Poland) K Drzewiecki (Argentina) S Rodríguez Taverna	4	6^{6}
2	(Monaco) R Arneodo (Austria) S Weissborn	6	7^{8}

Quarterfinals
(Czech Republic) P Nouza (Czech Republic) P Rikl	6	7^{7}
(France) M Guinard (France) G Jacq	3	6^{5}
(Argentina) G Andreozzi (Mexico) MÁ Reyes-Varela	6	6
(Czech Republic) R Jebavý (Austria) P Oswald	3	2
(France) T Arribagé (Romania) VV Cornea	6	6
(India) A Kadhe (India) J Nedunchezhiyan	3	2
I Liutarevich (Ukraine) V Manafov	2	6^{2}
2	(Monaco) R Arneodo (Austria) S Weissborn	6	7^{7}

Semifinals
(Czech Republic) P Nouza (Czech Republic) P Rikl	7	3	[14]
(Argentina) G Andreozzi (Mexico) MÁ Reyes-Varela	5	6	[16]
(France) T Arribagé (Romania) VV Cornea	6	6
2	(Monaco) R Arneodo (Austria) S Weissborn	4	4

Final
(Argentina) G Andreozzi (Mexico) MÁ Reyes-Varela	6	1	[10]
(France) T Arribagé (Romania) VV Cornea	4	6	[7]
