= 2025 Napoli Tennis Cup =

- Date: 24–30 March
- Edition: 23rd
- Surface: Clay / outdoor
- Location: Naples, Italy
- Venue: Tennis Club Napoli

Champions

Singles
- (Czech Republic) Vít Kopřiva

Doubles
- (Austria) Alexander Erler / (Germany) Constantin Frantzen
← 2024 ·	Napoli Tennis Cup	· 2026 →

The 2025 Napoli Tennis Cup was a professional men's tennis tournament played on outdoor clay courts. It was the 23rd edition of the tournament, and part of the 2025 ATP Challenger Tour. It took place at the Tennis Club Napoli in Naples, Italy from 24 to 30 March 2025.

== Champions ==
=== Singles ===
- (Czech Republic) Vít Kopřiva def. (Italy) Luciano Darderi 3–6, 6–3, 7–6^{(7–4)}.

=== Doubles ===
- (Austria) Alexander Erler / (Germany) Constantin Frantzen def. (France) Geoffrey Blancaneaux / (France) Albano Olivetti 6–4, 6–4.

== Singles main-draw entrants ==
=== Seeds ===
Country	Player	Rank^{1}	Seed
ITA	Luciano Darderi	61	1
BEL	Raphaël Collignon	91	2
ITA	Francesco Passaro	94	3
BRA	Thiago Seyboth Wild	96	4
ITA	Fabio Fognini	97	5
USA	Tristan Boyer	111	6
CRO	Borna Ćorić	112	7
TPE	Tseng Chun-hsin	115	8

- Rankings are as of 17 March 2025.

=== Other entrants ===
The following players received wildcards into the singles main draw:

- (Italy) Francesco Maestrelli
- (Brazil) Thiago Seyboth Wild
- (Italy) Giulio Zeppieri

The following players received entry into the singles main draw as alternates:

- (Romania) Filip Cristian Jianu
- (Germany) Max Hans Rehberg

The following players received entry from the qualifying draw:

- (Italy) Franco Agamenone
- (Czech Republic) Hynek Bartoň
- (Italy) Giovanni Fonio
- (Croatia) Borna Gojo
- (Italy) Andrea Pellegrino
- (Sweden) Elias Ymer
