= 2025 Napoli Tennis Cup – Doubles =

Doubles
- 2025 Napoli Tennis Cup

Final
- Champions: (Austria) Alexander Erler (Germany) Constantin Frantzen
- Runners-up: (France) Geoffrey Blancaneaux (France) Albano Olivetti
- Score: 6–4, 6–4

Events
| Singles | Doubles |
| ← 2024 · | Napoli Tennis Cup | · 2026 → |

Guido Andreozzi and Miguel Ángel Reyes-Varela were the defending champions but chose not to defend their title.

Alexander Erler and Constantin Frantzen won the title after defeating Geoffrey Blancaneaux and Albano Olivetti 6–4, 6–4 in the final.

== Seeds ==
1. (Austria) Alexander Erler / (Germany) Constantin Frantzen (champions)
2. (United Kingdom) Luke Johnson / (Austria) Lucas Miedler (semifinals)
3. (Germany) Jakob Schnaitter / (Germany) Mark Wallner (semifinals)
4. (Czech Republic) Petr Nouza / (Czech Republic) Patrik Rikl (quarterfinals)

== Draw ==
Key

- Q = Qualifier
- WC = Wild card
- LL = Lucky loser
- Alt = Alternate
- ITF = ITF entry
- PR = Protected ranking
- SR = Special ranking
- SE = Special exempt
- JE = Junior exempt
- JR = Junior Accelerator Programme entrant
- CO = College Accelerator Programme entrant
- NG = Next Gen Accelerator Program entrant
- w/o = Walkover
- r = Retired
- d = Defaulted

=== Draw ===
First round
1 | (Austria) A Erler (Germany) C Frantzen | 6 | 6
(Czech Republic) V Kopřiva (Czech Republic) D Svrčina | 2 | 4
(Ukraine) D Molchanov (Netherlands) M Veldheer | 6 | 7
WC | (Italy) G Cadenasso (Italy) Mariano Tammaro | 4 | 5
3 | (Germany) J Schnaitter (Germany) M Wallner | 6 | 7^{7}
(Peru) A Merino (Germany) C Negritu | 3 | 6^{5}
(Romania) A Jecan (Austria) D Pichler | 3 | 6 | [11]
(Slovakia) M Karol (Italy) G Ricca | 6 | 2 | [13]
(France) G Blancaneaux (France) A Olivetti | 6 | 4 | [10]
(Serbia) I Sabanov (Serbia) M Sabanov | 2 | 6 | [5]
(Brazil) M Demoliner (Netherlands) M Middelkoop | 7^{7} | 6^{2} | [7]
4 | (Czech Republic) P Nouza (Czech Republic) P Rikl | 6^{5} | 7^{7} | [10]
(India) S Nagal (Italy) A Pellegrino | 7 | 3 | [4]
(Belgium) R Collignon (Belgium) G Onclin | 5 | 6 | [10]
WC | (Italy) J Berrettini (Italy) F Maestrelli | 5 | 1
2 | (United Kingdom) L Johnson (Austria) L Miedler | 7 | 6

Quarterfinals
1 | (Austria) A Erler (Germany) C Frantzen | 6 | 7^{7}
(Ukraine) D Molchanov (Netherlands) M Veldheer | 3 | 6^{2}
3 | (Germany) J Schnaitter (Germany) M Wallner | 6 | 3 | [11]
(Slovakia) M Karol (Italy) G Ricca | 4 | 6 | [9]
(France) G Blancaneaux (France) A Olivetti | 4 | 6 | [12]
4 | (Czech Republic) P Nouza (Czech Republic) P Rikl | 6 | 4 | [10]
(Belgium) R Collignon (Belgium) G Onclin | 6 | 5 | [5]
2 | (United Kingdom) L Johnson (Austria) L Miedler | 2 | 7 | [10]

Semifinals
1 | (Austria) A Erler (Germany) C Frantzen | 7^{7} | 6
3 | (Germany) J Schnaitter (Germany) M Wallner | 6^{5} | 3
(France) G Blancaneaux (France) A Olivetti | 6 | 6
2 | (United Kingdom) L Johnson (Austria) L Miedler | 2 | 1

Final
1 | (Austria) A Erler (Germany) C Frantzen | 6 | 6
(France) G Blancaneaux (France) A Olivetti | 4 | 4
