= 2011 Tennis Napoli Cup – Singles =

Singles
- 2011 Tennis Napoli Cup

Final
- Champion: (Netherlands) Thomas Schoorel
- Runner-up: (Italy) Filippo Volandri
- Score: 6–2, 7–6^{(7–4)}

Events
Singles	Doubles
← 2010 ·	Tennis Napoli Cup	· 2012 →

Rui Machado was the defending champion, but decided not to participate.

Thomas Schoorel won his second Challenger title, defeating Filippo Volandri 6–2, 7–6^{(7–4)} in the final.

== Seeds ==
1. (France) Jérémy Chardy (first round)
2. (Italy) Filippo Volandri (final)
3. (Portugal) Frederico Gil (quarterfinals)
4. (Austria) Andreas Haider-Maurer (semifinals)
5. (Czech Republic) Ivo Minář (semifinals)
6. (Belgium) Steve Darcis (quarterfinals)
7. (Italy) Alessio di Mauro (second round)
8. (Spain) Daniel Muñoz-de la Nava (second round)

== Draw ==
=== Key ===
- Q = Qualifier
- WC = Wild card
- LL = Lucky loser
- Alt = Alternate
- SE = Special exempt
- PR = Protected ranking
- ITF = ITF entry
- JE = Junior exempt
- w/o = Walkover
- r = Retired
- d = Defaulted
- SR = Special ranking

=== Finals ===
Semifinals
(Netherlands) Thomas Schoorel	6	6^{4}	6
5	(Czech Republic) Ivo Minář	4	7^{7}	4
4	(Austria) Andreas Haider-Maurer	4	0
2	(Italy) Filippo Volandri	6	6

Final
(Netherlands) Thomas Schoorel	6	7^{7}
2	(Italy) Filippo Volandri	2	6^{4}

=== Top half ===
First round
1/WC	(France) J Chardy	4	3
(Netherlands) T Schoorel	6	6
(Germany) S Stadler	4	1
Q	(Slovakia) P Červenák	6	6
(Romania) A Ungur	3	6	6
(Romania) V Crivoi	6	1	3
(Slovakia) I Klec	4	6^{7}
6	(Belgium) S Darcis	6	7^{9}
3	(Portugal) F Gil	6	6
(France) A Gensse	3	4
(Italy) M Viola	3	6	3
Q	(United Kingdom) Daniel Smethurst	6	4	6
(Spain) R Bautista Agut	7^{7}	4	6
(France) M Teixeira	6^{5}	6	3
(Serbia) I Bozoljac	3	5
5	(Czech Republic) I Minář	6	7

Second round
(Netherlands) T Schoorel	6	7
Q	(Slovakia) P Červenák	4	5
(Romania) A Ungur	4	1
6	(Belgium) S Darcis	6	6
3	(Portugal) F Gil	6	6
Q	(United Kingdom) Daniel Smethurst	3	3
(Spain) R Bautista Agut	6^{5}	4
5	(Czech Republic) I Minář	7^{7}	6

Quarterfinals
(Netherlands) T Schoorel	6	7
6	(Belgium) S Darcis	4	5
3	(Portugal) F Gil	6^{5}	6	3
5	(Czech Republic) I Minář	7^{7}	3	6

Semifinals
(Netherlands) T Schoorel	6	6^{4}	6
5	(Czech Republic) I Minář	4	7^{7}	4

=== Bottom half ===
First round
8	(Spain) D Muñoz-de la Nava	6	4	7
(Spain) G Alcaide	2	6	5
WC	(Italy) M Trevisan	6	6
(Croatia) A Veić	3	4
(France) D Guez	2	6	3
Q	(United States) M Yani	6	4	6
Q	(Italy) Enrico Burzi	2	2
4	(Austria) A Haider-Maurer	6	6
7	(Italy) A di Mauro	6	5	6
WC	(Italy) Enrico Fioravante	2	7	2
(Serbia) N Ćirić	3	6^{6}
(Netherlands) I Sijsling	6	7^{8}
WC	(Austria) T Muster	3	5
(Belarus) U Ignatik	6	7
(Canada) P Polansky	0	2
2	(Italy) F Volandri	6	6

Second round
8	(Spain) D Muñoz-de la Nava	6^{7}	7^{7}	1
WC	(Italy) M Trevisan	7^{9}	6^{4}	6
Q	(United States) M Yani	6	3	1
4	(Austria) A Haider-Maurer	1	6	6
7	(Italy) A di Mauro	7	3	0
(Netherlands) I Sijsling	5	6	6
(Belarus) U Ignatik	3	2
2	(Italy) F Volandri	6	6

Quarterfinals
WC	(Italy) M Trevisan	6^{8}	1
4	(Austria) A Haider-Maurer	7^{10}	6
(Netherlands) I Sijsling	3^{r}
2	(Italy) F Volandri	6

Semifinals
4	(Austria) A Haider-Maurer	4	0
2	(Italy) F Volandri	6	6
