= 2016 Capri Watch Cup – Singles =

Singles
- 2016 Capri Watch Cup

Final
- Champion: (Slovakia) Jozef Kovalík
- Runner-up: (Belgium) Arthur De Greef
- Score: 6–3, 6–2

Events
Singles	Doubles
← 2015 ·	Capri Watch Cup	· 2021 →

Daniel Muñoz de la Nava was the defending champion, but decided not to defend his title.

Jozef Kovalík won the title, defeating Arthur De Greef 6–3, 6–2 in the final.

== Seeds ==
1. (Serbia) Filip Krajinović (second round)
2. (Brazil) Rogério Dutra Silva (second round)
3. (Germany) Jan-Lennard Struff (first round)
4. (Italy) Thomas Fabbiano (first round)
5. (Spain) Roberto Carballés Baena (quarterfinals)
6. (Portugal) Gastão Elias (semifinals)
7. (Slovakia) Andrej Martin (first round)
8. (Bosnia and Herzegovina) Mirza Bašić (second round)

== Draw ==
=== Key ===
- Q = Qualifier
- WC = Wild card
- LL = Lucky loser
- Alt = Alternate
- SE = Special exempt
- PR = Protected ranking
- ITF = ITF entry
- JE = Junior exempt
- w/o = Walkover
- r = Retired
- d = Defaulted
- SR = Special ranking

=== Finals ===
Semifinals
(Belgium) Arthur De Greef	6	6
(Romania) Marius Copil	3	2
6	(Portugal) Gastão Elias	1	7^{8}	3
(Slovakia) Jozef Kovalík	6	6^{6}	6

Final
(Belgium) Arthur De Greef	3	2
(Slovakia) Jozef Kovalík	6	6

=== Top half ===
First round
1	(Serbia) F Krajinović	5	6	6
Q	(Germany) J Reister	7	4	2
(Belgium) A De Greef	7	6
(Italy) L Vanni	5	4
(Italy) A Giannessi	6	6
(Chile) H Podlipnik	0	2
WC	(Italy) F Gaio	6	2	3
5	(Spain) R Carballés Baena	3	6	6
3	(Germany) J-L Struff	6^{4}	6	4
WC	(Italy) G Mager	7^{7}	4	6
(Romania) M Copil	6	4	6
Q	(Bulgaria) D Kuzmanov	3	6	2
Q	(Italy) F Cipolla	1	3
WC	(Italy) S Caruso	6	6
(Italy) A Arnaboldi	5	6	4
8	(Bosnia and Herzegovina) M Bašić	7	4	6

Second round
1	(Serbia) F Krajinović	4	5
(Belgium) A De Greef	6	7
(Italy) A Giannessi	2	7	3
5	(Spain) R Carballés Baena	6	5	6
WC	(Italy) G Mager	4	3
(Romania) M Copil	6	6
WC	(Italy) S Caruso	6	6^{7}	6
8	(Bosnia and Herzegovina) M Bašić	4	7^{9}	2

Quarterfinals
(Belgium) A De Greef	7^{7}	7
5	(Spain) R Carballés Baena	6^{2}	3
(Romania) M Copil	6	6
WC	(Italy) S Caruso	0	2

Semifinals
(Belgium) A De Greef	6	6
(Romania) M Copil	3	2

=== Bottom half ===
First round
6	(Portugal) G Elias	4	6	6
(Netherlands) I Sijsling	6	2	1
(Italy) M Donati	3	7^{7}	2
WC	(Italy) S Napolitano	6	6^{5}	6
(Romania) A Ungur	6	7^{8}
SE	(France) A Sidorenko	4	6^{6}
(Belarus) U Ignatik	6	6^{1}	7
4	(Italy) T Fabbiano	4	7^{7}	5
7	(Slovakia) A Martin	1	3
(Italy) F Volandri	6	6
Q	(Russia) A Vatutin	4	5
(Italy) G Naso	6	7
(Hungary) M Fucsovics	3	0
(Slovakia) J Kovalík	6	6
(Kazakhstan) A Golubev	1	0
2	(Brazil) R Dutra Silva	6	6

Second round
6	(Portugal) G Elias	7	6
WC	(Italy) S Napolitano	5	2
(Romania) A Ungur	5	2
(Belarus) U Ignatik	7	6
(Italy) F Volandri	7	4	6
(Italy) G Naso	5	6	1
(Slovakia) J Kovalík	7^{8}	6
2	(Brazil) R Dutra Silva	6^{6}	4

Quarterfinals
6	(Portugal) G Elias	6	6
(Belarus) U Ignatik	2	2
(Italy) F Volandri	4	7^{7}	2
(Slovakia) J Kovalík	6	6^{4}	6

Semifinals
6	(Portugal) G Elias	1	7^{8}	3
(Slovakia) J Kovalík	6	6^{6}	6
