= 2021 Tennis Napoli Cup – Singles =

Singles
- 2021 Tennis Napoli Cup

Final
- Champion: (Netherlands) Tallon Griekspoor
- Runner-up: (Italy) Andrea Pellegrino
- Score: 6–3, 6–2

Events
Singles	Doubles
← 2016 ·	Tennis Napoli Cup	· 2022 →

Jozef Kovalík was the defending champion but chose not to defend his title.

Tallon Griekspoor won the title after defeating Andrea Pellegrino 6–3, 6–2 in the final.

== Seeds ==
1. (Italy) Stefano Travaglia (semifinals)
2. (Slovakia) Andrej Martin (second round)
3. (Germany) Yannick Hanfmann (second round)
4. (Netherlands) Tallon Griekspoor (champion)
5. (Czech Republic) Zdeněk Kolář (second round)
6. (Italy) Alessandro Giannessi (first round, retired)
7. (Italy) Gian Marco Moroni (quarterfinals)
8. (Italy) Lorenzo Giustino (first round)

== Draw ==
=== Key ===
- Q = Qualifier
- WC = Wild card
- LL = Lucky loser
- Alt = Alternate
- ITF = ITF entry
- PR = Protected ranking
- SR = Special ranking
- SE = Special exempt
- JE = Junior exempt
- JR = Junior Accelerator Programme entrant
- CO = College Accelerator Programme entrant
- NG = Next Gen Accelerator Program entrant
- w/o = Walkover
- r = Retired
- d = Defaulted

=== Finals ===
Semifinals
1	(Italy) Stefano Travaglia	6	4	2
4	(Netherlands) Tallon Griekspoor	2	6	6
(Italy) Andrea Pellegrino	6	4
(Croatia) Duje Ajduković	2	1^{r}

Final
4	(Netherlands) Tallon Griekspoor	6	6
(Italy) Andrea Pellegrino	3	2

=== Top half ===
First round
1	(Italy) S Travaglia	7^{7}	6
(Turkey) E Kırkın	6^{3}	3
(Netherlands) J de Jong	3	4
(Italy) F Cobolli	6	6
(Italy) F Agamenone	6	1	2
(Italy) A Vavassori	2	6	6
WC	(Italy) M Arnaldi	2	3
6	(Italy) A Giannessi	6	1^{r}
4	(Netherlands) T Griekspoor	6	0
Q	(Italy) J Ocleppo	4	0^{r}
(United States) A Ritschard	6	6
(Czech Republic) J Forejtek	4	4
PR	(Italy) F Baldi	6	3	6
LL	(Greece) Pe Tsitsipas	4	6	4
Alt	(Serbia) M Zekić	1	7^{7}	2
7	(Italy) GM Moroni	6	6^{2}	6

Second round
1	(Italy) S Travaglia	6	6
(Italy) F Cobolli	2	2
(Italy) A Vavassori	2	6	7^{7}
WC	(Italy) M Arnaldi	6	2	6^{3}
4	(Netherlands) T Griekspoor	3	7	6
(United States) A Ritschard	6	5	1
PR	(Italy) F Baldi	5	3
7	(Italy) GM Moroni	7	6

Quarterfinals
1	(Italy) S Travaglia	7^{10}	7
(Italy) A Vavassori	6^{8}	5
4	(Netherlands) T Griekspoor	6	7^{7}
7	(Italy) GM Moroni	3	6^{1}

Semifinals
1	(Italy) S Travaglia	6	4	2
4	(Netherlands) T Griekspoor	2	6	6

=== Bottom half ===
First round
5	(Czech Republic) Z Kolář	6	6
(Croatia) N Serdarušić	4	4
Q	(Italy) R Brancaccio	7^{7}	4
Q	(Romania) Bogdan Ionuț Apostol	6^{1}	0^{r}
WC	(Italy) J Berrettini	2	4
(Italy) A Pellegrino	6	6
WC	(Italy) L Nardi	0	6	1
3	(Germany) Y Hanfmann	6	2	6
8	(Italy) L Giustino	6	1	1
(Italy) R Bonadio	3	6	6
(France) G Blancaneaux	1	6	6^{4}
(Bosnia and Herzegovina) M Bašić	6	2	7^{7}
(Croatia) D Ajduković	6	6
(France) E Furness	4	4
Q	(Italy) Marco Miceli	6	3	4
2	(Slovakia) A Martin	4	6	6

Second round
5	(Czech Republic) Z Kolář	4	7^{8}	2
Q	(Italy) R Brancaccio	6	6^{6}	6
(Italy) A Pellegrino	6	6
3	(Germany) Y Hanfmann	3	3
(Italy) R Bonadio	6	1	6^{4}
(Bosnia and Herzegovina) M Bašić	4	6	7^{7}
(Croatia) D Ajduković	4	6	6
2	(Slovakia) A Martin	6	3	3

Quarterfinals
Q	(Italy) R Brancaccio	5	6^{6}
(Italy) A Pellegrino	7	7^{8}
(Bosnia and Herzegovina) M Bašić	4	4
(Croatia) D Ajduković	6	6

Semifinals
(Italy) A Pellegrino	6	4
(Croatia) D Ajduković	2	1^{r}
