= 2009 Tennis Napoli Cup – Singles =

Singles
- 2009 Tennis Napoli Cup

Final
- Champion: (Uruguay) Pablo Cuevas
- Runner-up: (Romania) Victor Crivoi
- Score: 6–1, 6–3

Events
Singles	Doubles
← 2008 ·	Tennis Napoli Cup	· 2010 →

Potito Starace was the three-time defending champion, but he lost to Andreas Haider-Maurer in the first round.

Pablo Cuevas won in the final 6–1, 6–3, against Victor Crivoi.

== Seeds ==
1. (Italy) Potito Starace (first round)
2. (Spain) Alberto Martín (second round)
3. (Spain) Daniel Gimeno-Traver (second round)
4. (Spain) Pablo Andújar (semifinals)
5. (Belgium) Kristof Vliegen (first round)
6. (Brazil) Marcos Daniel (quarterfinals)
7. (Czech Republic) Ivo Minář (second round)
8. (Austria) Daniel Köllerer (first round)

== Draw ==
=== Key ===
- Q = Qualifier
- WC = Wild card
- LL = Lucky loser
- Alt = Alternate
- SE = Special exempt
- PR = Protected ranking
- ITF = ITF entry
- JE = Junior exempt
- w/o = Walkover
- r = Retired
- d = Defaulted
- SR = Special ranking

=== Finals ===
Semifinals
(Romania) Victor Crivoi	7^{7}	6
WC	(Italy) Fabio Fognini	6^{2}	4
4	(Spain) Pablo Andújar	3	2
(Uruguay) Pablo Cuevas	6	6

Final
(Romania) Victor Crivoi	1	3
(Uruguay) Pablo Cuevas	6	6

=== Top half ===
First round
1	(Italy) P Starace	4	3
SE	(Austria) A Haider-Maurer	6	6
Q	(Germany) F Mayer	3	r
(Kazakhstan) A Golubev	4
(Portugal) R Machado	6^{4}	5
(Serbia) B Pašanski	7^{7}	7
(Romania) V Crivoi	1	7^{7}	6
5	(Belgium) K Vliegen	6	6^{5}	2
3	(Spain) D Gimeno-Traver	6	6
(Italy) F Cipolla	1	3
WC	(Italy) S Galvani	4	2
WC	(Italy) F Fognini	6	6
(Peru) L Horna	6^{5}	6	6
(Algeria) L Ouahab	7^{7}	2	4
WC	(Italy) G Petrazzuolo	7	1	4
6	(Brazil) M Daniel	5	6	6

Second round
SE	(Austria) A Haider-Maurer	6	3	4
(Kazakhstan) A Golubev	1	6	6
(Serbia) B Pašanski	6	2	2
(Romania) V Crivoi	3	6	6
3	(Spain) D Gimeno-Traver	3	2
WC	(Italy) F Fognini	6	6
(Peru) L Horna	2	r
6	(Brazil) M Daniel	4

Quarterfinals
(Kazakhstan) A Golubev	1	6	2
(Romania) V Crivoi	6	3	6
WC	(Italy) F Fognini	6	6
6	(Brazil) M Daniel	4	2

Semifinals
(Romania) V Crivoi	7^{7}	6
WC	(Italy) F Fognini	6^{2}	4

=== Bottom half ===
First round
7	(Czech Republic) I Minář	5
(Uzbekistan) D Istomin	4	r
Q	(Argentina) F Delbonis	7^{8}	6
(Spain) P Riba	6^{6}	2
(Italy) T Tenconi	7^{7}	6
(Czech Republic) L Rosol	6^{2}	4
Q	(Ukraine) O Dolgopolov Jr.	5	6^{1}
4	(Spain) P Andújar	7	7^{7}
8	(Austria) D Köllerer	1	0
(Uruguay) P Cuevas	6	6
SE	(Spain) D Marrero	6	7^{7}
WC	(Italy) Enrico Fioravante	1	6^{1}
(Czech Republic) J Hájek	6	5	4
(Spain) S Ventura	2	7	6
(Spain) R Ramírez Hidalgo	6^{4}	3
2	(Spain) A Martín	7^{7}	6

Second round
7	(Czech Republic) I Minář	3	2
Q	(Argentina) F Delbonis	6	6
(Italy) T Tenconi	1	1
4	(Spain) P Andújar	6	6
(Uruguay) P Cuevas	6	3	6
SE	(Spain) D Marrero	4	6	1
(Spain) S Ventura	7	6
2	(Spain) A Martín	5	2

Quarterfinals
Q	(Argentina) F Delbonis	5	2
4	(Spain) P Andújar	7	6
(Uruguay) P Cuevas	6	6
(Spain) S Ventura	4	3

Semifinals
4	(Spain) P Andújar	3	2
(Uruguay) P Cuevas	6	6
