= 2012 Tennis Napoli Cup – Singles =

Singles
- 2012 Tennis Napoli Cup

Final
- Champion: (Russia) Andrey Kuznetsov
- Runner-up: (France) Jonathan Dasnières de Veigy
- Score: 7–6^{(8–6)}, 7–6^{(8–6)}

Events
Singles	Doubles
← 2011 ·	Tennis Napoli Cup	· 2013 →

Thomas Schoorel was the defending champion.
Andrey Kuznetsov won the final 7–6^{(8–6)}, 7–6^{(8–6)} against Jonathan Dasnières de Veigy.

== Seeds ==
1. (Luxembourg) Gilles Müller (second round)
2. (Italy) Simone Bolelli (first round, retired)
3. (Netherlands) Igor Sijsling (second round, retired due to a right knee injury)
4. (France) Adrian Mannarino (semifinals, withdrew due to a left ankle injury)
5. (Italy) Alessandro Giannessi (first round, retired due to the flu)
6. (Netherlands) Thomas Schoorel (semifinals)
7. (Germany) Dustin Brown (quarterfinals)
8. (France) Florent Serra (second round)

== Draw ==
=== Key ===
- Q = Qualifier
- WC = Wild card
- LL = Lucky loser
- Alt = Alternate
- SE = Special exempt
- PR = Protected ranking
- ITF = ITF entry
- JE = Junior exempt
- w/o = Walkover
- r = Retired
- d = Defaulted
- SR = Special ranking

=== Finals ===
Semifinals
(Russia) Andrey Kuznetsov	w/o
4	(France) Adrian Mannarino
(France) Jonathan Dasnières de Veigy	6	6
6	(Netherlands) Thomas Schoorel	0	3

Final
(Russia) Andrey Kuznetsov	7^{8}	7^{8}
(France) Jonathan Dasnières de Veigy	6^{6}	6^{6}

=== Top half ===
First round
1	(Luxembourg) G Müller	7	5	6
WC	(Italy) Enrico Fioravante	5	7	1
(Portugal) P Sousa	6	6
WC	(Italy) M Cecchinato	1	1
(France) M Rodrigues	1	2
(Russia) A Kuznetsov	6	6
(Australia) B Mitchell	4	4
8	(France) F Serra	6	6
4	(France) A Mannarino	7^{7}	5	6
(Belgium) Y Mertens	6^{2}	7	4
WC	(Italy) Stefano Napolitano	6	2	4
Q	(Czech Republic) R Jebavý	1	6	6
(Lithuania) L Grigelis	7^{7}	4	4
(Belgium) M Authom	6^{3}	6	6
(Austria) M Fischer	6	2
5	(Italy) A Giannessi	4	0^{r}

Second round
1	(Luxembourg) G Müller	4	2
(Portugal) P Sousa	6	6
(Russia) A Kuznetsov	6	7^{7}
8	(France) F Serra	2	6^{4}
4	(France) A Mannarino	6	6
Q	(Czech Republic) R Jebavý	2	1
(Belgium) M Authom	5	6	7^{7}
(Austria) M Fischer	7	1	6^{2}

Quarterfinals
(Portugal) P Sousa	6	0	5
(Russia) A Kuznetsov	3	6	7
4	(France) A Mannarino	6	6
(Belgium) M Authom	3	4

Semifinals
(Russia) A Kuznetsov	w/o
4	(France) A Mannarino

=== Bottom half ===
First round
7	(Germany) D Brown	6	6
(Italy) M Viola	2	1
(Italy) Enrico Burzi	5	6^{4}
(Italy) T Fabbiano	7	7^{7}
WC	(Italy) Federico Gaio	6	3	2
(France) J Dasnières de Veigy	3	6	6
(Italy) D Giorgini	4	4
3	(Netherlands) I Sijsling	6	6
6	(Netherlands) T Schoorel	6	6
(France) R Jouan	4	4
(Czech Republic) D Lojda	7^{7}	6
Q	(Russia) M Ledovskikh	6^{2}	3
(Serbia) D Lajović	6	6
Q	(Switzerland) Adrien Bossel	2	4
Q	(Italy) R Bellotti	6	3
2	(Italy) S Bolelli	3	1^{r}

Second round
7	(Germany) D Brown	6	6^{2}	4
(Italy) T Fabbiano	2	7^{7}	6
(France) J Dasnières de Veigy	2	6	3
3	(Netherlands) I Sijsling	6	3	2^{r}
6	(Netherlands) T Schoorel	6	7^{7}
(Czech Republic) D Lojda	4	6^{3}
(Serbia) D Lajović	6	6
Q	(Italy) R Bellotti	1	3

Quarterfinals
(Italy) T Fabbiano	4	0
(France) J Dasnières de Veigy	6	6
6	(Netherlands) T Schoorel	6^{2}	6	7
(Serbia) D Lajović	7^{7}	2	5

Semifinals
(France) J Dasnières de Veigy	6	6
6	(Netherlands) T Schoorel	0	3
