= 2010 Tennis Napoli Cup – Doubles =

Doubles
- 2010 Tennis Napoli Cup

Final
- Champions: (Jamaica) Dustin Brown (United States) Jesse Witten
- Runners-up: (India) Rohan Bopanna (Pakistan) Aisam-ul-Haq Qureshi
- Score: 7–6(4), 7–5

Events
Singles	Doubles
← 2009 ·	Tennis Napoli Cup	· 2011 →

Pablo Cuevas and David Marrero were the defending champions, but they chose to not participate.
Dustin Brown and Jesse Witten won in the final 7–6(4), 7–5, against Rohan Bopanna and Aisam-ul-Haq Qureshi.

== Seeds ==
1. (India) Rohan Bopanna / (Pakistan) Aisam-ul-Haq Qureshi (final)
2. (United States) James Cerretani / (Canada) Adil Shamasdin (quarterfinals)
3. (Serbia) Ilija Bozoljac / (Italy) Daniele Bracciali (semifinals)
4. (Austria) Martin Fischer / (Russia) Dmitri Sitak (quarterfinals)

== Draw ==
=== Key ===
- Q = Qualifier
- WC = Wild card
- LL = Lucky loser
- Alt = Alternate
- SE = Special exempt
- PR = Protected ranking
- ITF = ITF entry
- JE = Junior exempt
- w/o = Walkover
- r = Retired
- d = Defaulted
- SR = Special ranking

=== Draw ===
First round
1	(India) R Bopanna (Pakistan) A-u-H Qureshi	6	7
WC	(Italy) T Fabbiano (Italy) E Fioravante	3	6^{5}
ALT	(Chile) A García (Argentina) L Migani	1	4
WC	(Slovenia) B Kavčič (Croatia) F Škugor	6	6
4	(Austria) M Fischer (Russia) D Sitak	4	7	[10]
(Spain) P Andújar (Spain) P Riba	6	6^{4}	[4]
(Argentina) D Junqueira (Argentina) M Vassallo Argüello	6	6
(Italy) A Arnaboldi (Italy) A Motti	4	2
(Brazil) M Demoliner (Brazil) R Guidolin	1	7	[9]
(Argentina) F del Bonis (Spain) A Ramos-Viñolas	6	6^{6}	[11]
WC	(Chile) J Aguilar (Spain) G Olaso	4	4
3	(Serbia) I Bozoljac (Italy) D Bracciali	6	6
(Romania) V Crivoi (Romania) A Ungur	4	3
(Jamaica) D Brown (United States) J Witten	6	6
(Germany) J Reister (United Kingdom) K Skupski
2	(United States) J Cerretani (Canada) A Shamasdin	w/o

Quartenfinals
1	(India) R Bopanna (Pakistan) A-u-H Qureshi	w/o
WC	(Slovenia) B Kavčič (Croatia) F Škugor
4	(Austria) M Fischer (Russia) D Sitak	4	2
(Argentina) D Junqueira (Argentina) M Vassallo Argüello	6	6
(Argentina) F del Bonis (Spain) A Ramos-Viñolas	6^{7}	7	[12]
3	(Serbia) I Bozoljac (Italy) D Bracciali	7	6^{5}	[14]
(Jamaica) D Brown (United States) J Witten	6	6
2	(United States) J Cerretani (Canada) A Shamasdin	4	0

Semifinals
1	(India) R Bopanna (Pakistan) A-u-H Qureshi	7	6
(Argentina) D Junqueira (Argentina) M Vassallo Argüello	6^{4}	4
3	(Serbia) I Bozoljac (Italy) D Bracciali	6	3	[8]
(Jamaica) D Brown (United States) J Witten	2	6	[10]

Final
1	(India) R Bopanna (Pakistan) A-u-H Qureshi	6^{4}	5
(Jamaica) D Brown (United States) J Witten	7	7
