= 2022 Tennis Napoli Cup =

- Date: 17–23 October
- Edition: 21st
- Category: ATP Tour 250 series
- Draw: 28S / 16D
- Prize money: €612,000
- Surface: Hard / outdoor
- Location: Naples, Italy
- Venue: Tennis Club Napoli

Champions

Singles
- (Italy) Lorenzo Musetti

Doubles
- (Croatia) Ivan Dodig / (United States) Austin Krajicek
← 2021 ·	Tennis Napoli Cup	· 2024 →

The 2022 Tennis Napoli Cup was a professional men's tennis tournament played on outdoor hard courts. It was the 21st edition of the tournament, and part of the ATP Tour 250 series of the 2022 ATP Tour. It took place at the Tennis Club Napoli in Naples, Italy from 17 to 23 October 2022.

The tournament was upgraded from an ATP Challenger Tour event to an ATP Tour 250 event this year. It was one of the six tournaments that were given single-year ATP 250 licenses in September and October 2022 due to the cancellation of tournaments in China because of the ongoing COVID-19 pandemic.

== Champions ==
=== Singles ===
- (Italy) Lorenzo Musetti def. (Italy) Matteo Berrettini, 7–6^{(7–5)}, 6–2

=== Doubles ===
- (Croatia) Ivan Dodig / (United States) Austin Krajicek def. (Australia) Matthew Ebden / (Australia) John Peers, 6–3, 1–6, [10–8]

== Singles main-draw entrants ==
=== Seeds ===
Country	Player	Rank^{1}	Seed
ESP	Pablo Carreño Busta	15	1
ITA	Matteo Berrettini	16	2
ESP	Roberto Bautista Agut	22	3
ITA	Lorenzo Musetti	28	4
SRB	Miomir Kecmanović	32	5
ARG	Sebastián Báez	35	6
ESP	Albert Ramos Viñolas	40	7
FRA	Adrian Mannarino	44	8

- Rankings are as of 10 October 2022

=== Other entrants ===
The following players received wildcards into the singles main draw:

- (Italy) Matteo Berrettini
- (Italy) Flavio Cobolli
- (Italy) Luca Nardi

The following players received entry from the qualifying draw:

- (Croatia) Borna Gojo
- (Chile) Nicolás Jarry
- (Italy) Francesco Passaro
- (China) Zhang Zhizhen

=== Withdrawals ===
Before the tournament

- (Spain) Alejandro Davidovich Fokina → replaced by (Spain) Bernabé Zapata Miralles
- (France) Gaël Monfils → replaced by (Portugal) Nuno Borges
- (United States) Brandon Nakashima → replaced by (France) Hugo Grenier
- Andrey Rublev → replaced by (Japan) Taro Daniel

== Doubles main-draw entrants ==
=== Seeds ===
Country	Player	Country	Player	Rank^{1}	Seed
CRO	Ivan Dodig	USA	Austin Krajicek	48	1
ITA	Simone Bolelli	ITA	Fabio Fognini	51	2
AUS	Matthew Ebden	AUS	John Peers	52	3
BRA	Rafael Matos	ESP	David Vega Hernández	67	4

- Rankings are as of 10 October 2022

=== Other entrants ===
The following pairs received wildcards into the doubles main draw:

- (Italy) Francesco Maestrelli / (Italy) Francesco Passaro
- (Italy) Stefano Napolitano / (Italy) Andrea Pellegrino
