= 2010 Tennis Napoli Cup – Singles =

Singles
- 2010 Tennis Napoli Cup

Final
- Champion: (Portugal) Rui Machado
- Runner-up: (Argentina) Federico Delbonis
- Score: 6–4, 6–4

Events
Singles	Doubles
← 2009 ·	Tennis Napoli Cup	· 2011 →

Pablo Cuevas was the defending champion, however he chose not to participate this year.

Rui Machado won the title, defeating Federico Delbonis 6–4, 6–4 in the final.

== Seeds ==
1. (Italy) Potito Starace (second round)
2. (Italy) Paolo Lorenzi (second round)
3. (Kazakhstan) Andrey Golubev (semifinals)
4. (Slovenia) Blaž Kavčič (first round)
5. (Russia) Igor Kunitsyn (first round)
6. (Spain) Pere Riba (withdrew)
7. (Romania) Victor Crivoi (first round)
8. (Portugal) Rui Machado (champion)

== Draw ==
=== Key ===
- Q = Qualifier
- WC = Wild card
- LL = Lucky loser
- Alt = Alternate
- SE = Special exempt
- PR = Protected ranking
- ITF = ITF entry
- JE = Junior exempt
- w/o = Walkover
- r = Retired
- d = Defaulted
- SR = Special ranking

=== Finals ===
Semifinals
(Argentina) Federico Delbonis	6	6
Q	(Chile) Adrián García	3	4
3	(Kazakhstan) Andrey Golubev	3	3
8	(Portugal) Rui Machado	6	6

Final
(Argentina) Federico Delbonis	4	4
8	(Portugal) Rui Machado	6	6

=== Top half ===
First round
1/WC	(Italy) P Starace	6	6
(Argentina) S Decoud	4	0
(Argentina) F Delbonis	7^{7}	6
(Italy) F Cipolla	6^{4}	4
(Czech Republic) I Minář	7^{8}	6
(Jamaica) D Brown	6^{6}	2
WC	(Italy) M Trevisan	4	r
LL	(Argentina) M Alund	5
4	(Slovenia) B Kavčič	4	1
(Spain) A Ramos-Viñolas	6	6
(Argentina) M Vassallo Argüello	6	7^{7}
LL	(Argentina) J-M Aranguren	2	6^{4}
(Italy) S Bolelli	6	6
ALT	(Kazakhstan) M Kukushkin	4	2
Q	(Chile) A García	7	6
7	(Romania) V Crivoi	5	0

Second round
1/WC	(Italy) P Starace	5	3
(Argentina) F Delbonis	7	6
(Czech Republic) I Minář	7	4	7^{7}
LL	(Argentina) M Alund	5	6	6^{2}
(Spain) A Ramos-Viñolas	6	6
(Argentina) M Vassallo Argüello	2	4
(Italy) S Bolelli	4	4
Q	(Chile) A García	6	6

Quarterfinals
(Argentina) F Delbonis	7	1	7^{8}
(Czech Republic) I Minář	5	6	6^{6}
(Spain) A Ramos-Viñolas	6^{8}	2
Q	(Chile) A García	7^{10}	6

Semifinals
(Argentina) F Delbonis	6	6
Q	(Chile) A García	3	4

=== Bottom half ===
First round
5	(Russia) I Kunitsyn	0	4
(Romania) A Ungur	6	6
Q	(Chile) J Aguilar	6^{0}	5
(Italy) F Volandri	7^{7}	7
(Serbia) I Bozoljac	2	6	4
(Spain) P Andújar	6	3	6
Q	(Italy) A Arnaboldi	4	3
3	(Kazakhstan) A Golubev	6	6
8	(Portugal) R Machado	6	6
(Austria) M Fischer	3	2
Q	(Italy) F Aldi	0	6	3
WC	(Italy) T Fabbiano	6	4	6
(United States) J Witten	3	1
(Argentina) D Junqueira	6	6
WC	(Australia) B Tomic	2	4
2	(Italy) P Lorenzi	6	6

Second round
(Romania) A Ungur	4	0
(Italy) F Volandri	6	6
(Spain) P Andújar	6	4	0
3	(Kazakhstan) A Golubev	3	6	6
8	(Portugal) R Machado	6	6
WC	(Italy) T Fabbiano	3	0
(Argentina) D Junqueira	6	6
2	(Italy) P Lorenzi	1	3

Quarterfinals
(Italy) F Volandri	4	6^{5}
3	(Kazakhstan) A Golubev	6	7^{7}
8	(Portugal) R Machado	6	2	6
(Argentina) D Junqueira	3	6	1

Semifinals
3	(Kazakhstan) A Golubev	3	3
8	(Portugal) R Machado	6	6
