= 2026 Napoli Tennis Cup – Singles =

Singles
- 2026 Napoli Tennis Cup

Final
- Champion: (Serbia) Hamad Medjedovic
- Runner-up: (Germany) Daniel Altmaier
- Score: 6–2, 6–4

Events
Singles	Doubles
- Napoli Tennis Cup

Vít Kopřiva was the defending champion but lost in the first round to Francesco Forti.

Hamad Medjedovic won the title after defeating Daniel Altmaier 6–2, 6–4 in the final.

== Seeds ==
1. (Germany) Daniel Altmaier (final)
2. (Czech Republic) Vít Kopřiva (first round)
3. (France) Alexandre Müller (quarterfinals)
4. (Switzerland) Stan Wawrinka (first round)
5. (Serbia) Hamad Medjedovic (champion)
6. (Italy) Andrea Pellegrino (second round)
7. (France) Kyrian Jacquet (first round)
8. (France) Ugo Blanchet (first round)

== Draw ==
Key

- Q = Qualifier
- WC = Wild card
- LL = Lucky loser
- Alt = Alternate
- ITF = ITF entry
- PR = Protected ranking
- SR = Special ranking
- SE = Special exempt
- JE = Junior exempt
- JR = Junior Accelerator Programme entrant
- CO = College Accelerator Programme entrant
- NG = Next Gen Accelerator Program entrant
- w/o = Walkover
- r = Retired
- d = Defaulted

=== Finals ===
Semifinals
1/WC	(Germany) Daniel Altmaier	6	2	6
Q	(Italy) Federico Bondioli	2	6	1
5	(Serbia) Hamad Medjedovic	7	6
(Ukraine) Vitaliy Sachko	5	1

Final
1/WC	(Germany) Daniel Altmaier	2	4
5	(Serbia) Hamad Medjedovic	6	6

=== Top half ===
First round
1/WC	(Germany) D Altmaier	6	6
(Spain) M Damas	3	1
LL	(Italy) A Guerrieri	7^{9}	2	7^{9}
(Italy) S Travaglia	6^{7}	6	6^{7}
(Kazakhstan) M Kukushkin	1	6	5
Q	(Italy) E Dalla Valle	6	3	7
(Italy) L Giustino	2	6	6
7	(France) K Jacquet	6	4	0
4	(Switzerland) S Wawrinka	6	4	6^{2}
(France) M Martineau	2	6	7^{7}
(Georgia (country)) S Purtseladze	2	3
Q	(Italy) M Ribecai	6	6
(India) S Nagal	7	3	6
(Germany) H Squire	5	6	4
Q	(Italy) F Bondioli	7^{7}	6
8	(France) U Blanchet	6^{5}	4

Second round
1/WC	(Germany) D Altmaier	6	4	6
LL	(Italy) A Guerrieri	4	6	3
Q	(Italy) E Dalla Valle	4	6	6
(Italy) L Giustino	6	4	1
(France) M Martineau	6	4	2
Q	(Italy) M Ribecai	2	6	6
(India) S Nagal	2	6	5
Q	(Italy) F Bondioli	6	4	7

Quarterfinals
1/WC	(Germany) D Altmaier	6	6
Q	(Italy) E Dalla Valle	1	3
Q	(Italy) M Ribecai	3	2
Q	(Italy) F Bondioli	6	6

Semifinals
1/WC	(Germany) D Altmaier	6	2	6
Q	(Italy) F Bondioli	2	6	1

=== Bottom half ===
First round
5	(Serbia) H Medjedovic	6	4	7^{7}
Q	(Czech Republic) H Bartoň	3	6	6^{2}
(Greece) S Sakellaridis	6	1	7
LL	(Spain) D Jordà Sanchis	1	6	5
WC	(Italy) CA Caniato	6	6
WC	(Italy) J Vasamì	3	2
Q	(Switzerland) J Paul	5	4
3	(France) A Müller	7	6
6	(Italy) A Pellegrino	6	6
(Romania) FC Jianu	1	4
(France) G Blancaneaux	2	1
(Ukraine) V Sachko	6	6
(Italy) F Cinà	6	6
Alt	(Italy) G Piraino	4	2
Q	(Italy) F Forti	6	6
2	(Czech Republic) V Kopřiva	3	4

Second round
5	(Serbia) H Medjedovic	6	3	7
(Greece) S Sakellaridis	4	6	5
WC	(Italy) CA Caniato	6	6^{5}	4
3	(France) A Müller	4	7^{7}	6
6	(Italy) A Pellegrino	6	3	4
(Ukraine) V Sachko	4	6	6
(Italy) F Cinà	6	6
Q	(Italy) F Forti	3	3

Quarterfinals
5	(Serbia) H Medjedovic	6	6
3	(France) A Müller	2	2
(Ukraine) V Sachko	6	4	6
(Italy) F Cinà	2	6	1

Semifinals
5	(Serbia) H Medjedovic	7	6
(Ukraine) V Sachko	5	1
