= 2024 Tennis Napoli Cup – Singles =

Singles
- 2024 Tennis Napoli Cup

Final
- Champion: (Italy) Luca Nardi
- Runner-up: (France) Pierre-Hugues Herbert
- Score: 5–7, 7–6^{(7–3)}, 6–2

Events
Singles	Doubles
← 2022 ·	Tennis Napoli Cup	· 2025 →

Lorenzo Musetti was the defending champion but chose not to defend his title.

Luca Nardi won the title after defeating Pierre-Hugues Herbert 5–7, 7–6^{(7–3)}, 6–2 in the final.

== Seeds ==
1. (Argentina) Federico Coria (quarterfinals)
2. (Italy) Luca Nardi (champion)
3. (Germany) Maximilian Marterer (second round, withdrew)
4. (Italy) Fabio Fognini (second round)
5. (France) Corentin Moutet (semifinals)
6. (Hungary) Zsombor Piros (first round)
7. (Italy) Matteo Gigante (quarterfinals)
8. (France) Pierre-Hugues Herbert (final)

== Draw ==
=== Key ===
- Q = Qualifier
- WC = Wild card
- LL = Lucky loser
- Alt = Alternate
- ITF = ITF entry
- PR = Protected ranking
- SR = Special ranking
- SE = Special exempt
- JE = Junior exempt
- JR = Junior Accelerator Programme entrant
- CO = College Accelerator Programme entrant
- NG = Next Gen Accelerator Program entrant
- w/o = Walkover
- r = Retired
- d = Defaulted

=== Finals ===
Semifinals
5	(France) Corentin Moutet	6	3	1
8	(France) Pierre-Hugues Herbert	4	6	6
Alt	(Italy) Francesco Passaro	6	5	1
2	(Italy) Luca Nardi	3	7	6

Final
8	(France) Pierre-Hugues Herbert	7	6^{3}	2
2	(Italy) Luca Nardi	5	7^{7}	6

=== Top half ===
First round
1	(Argentina) F Coria	6	6
Q	(France) M Guinard	3	0
Q	(Belgium) M Geerts	5	4
PR	(Serbia) F Krajinović	7	6
SE	(Georgia (country)) N Basilashvili	4	6	7^{7}
(Tunisia) A Dougaz	6	1	6^{1}
Q	(France) M Bourgue	4	4
5	(France) C Moutet	6	6
4	(Italy) F Fognini	6	1	6
(Argentina) S Rodríguez Taverna	3	6	2
(Italy) S Travaglia	3	4
Q	(France) A Géa	6	6
(Italy) M Cecchinato	6^{4}	4
WC	(Italy) F Maestrelli	7^{7}	6
WC	(Italy) R Brancaccio	6	5	0
8	(France) P-H Herbert	3	7	6

Second round
1	(Argentina) F Coria	0	7^{7}	6
PR	(Serbia) F Krajinović	6	6^{5}	2
SE	(Georgia (country)) N Basilashvili	1	6	6^{3}
5	(France) C Moutet	6	3	7^{7}
4	(Italy) F Fognini	6	2	4
Q	(France) A Géa	4	6	6
WC	(Italy) F Maestrelli	4	6	3
8	(France) P-H Herbert	6	3	6

Quarterfinals
1	(Argentina) F Coria	1	5
5	(France) C Moutet	6	7
Q	(France) A Géa	7^{7}	4	4
8	(France) P-H Herbert	6^{4}	6	6

Semifinals
5	(France) C Moutet	6	3	1
8	(France) P-H Herbert	4	6	6

=== Bottom half ===
First round
6	(Hungary) Z Piros	6	4	5
Alt	(Italy) F Passaro	4	6	7
Q	(France) E Furness	3	2
(Italy) S Napolitano	6	6
(France) U Blanchet	6	6
(Bosnia and Herzegovina) N Fatić	3	4
LL	(Sweden) E Ymer	3	0
3	(Germany) M Marterer	6	6
7	(Italy) M Gigante	6	6
(France) B Bonzi	3	0
Q	(Italy) Samuel Vincent Ruggeri	7^{7}	6
WC	(Italy) E Dalla Valle	6^{5}	3
(France) M Martineau	3	7^{7}	6
(Italy) F Agamenone	6	6^{3}	2
(Slovakia) J Kovalík	3	3
2	(Italy) L Nardi	6	6

Second round
Alt	(Italy) F Passaro	7^{8}	0	6
(Italy) S Napolitano	6^{6}	6	4
(France) U Blanchet	w/o
3	(Germany) M Marterer
7	(Italy) M Gigante	4	6	6
Q	(Italy) S Vincent Ruggeri	6	4	3
(France) M Martineau	6^{4}	1
2	(Italy) L Nardi	7^{7}	6

Quarterfinals
Alt	(Italy) F Passaro	6	2	6
(France) U Blanchet	2	6	2
7	(Italy) M Gigante	6	4	1
2	(Italy) L Nardi	4	6	6

Semifinals
Alt	(Italy) F Passaro	6	5	1
2	(Italy) L Nardi	3	7	6
