= 2022 Tennis Napoli Cup – Singles =

Singles
- 2022 Tennis Napoli Cup

Final
- Champion: (Italy) Lorenzo Musetti
- Runner-up: (Italy) Matteo Berrettini
- Score: 7–6^{(7–5)}, 6–2

Events
Singles	Doubles
← 2021 ·	Tennis Napoli Cup	· 2024 →

Lorenzo Musetti defeated Matteo Berrettini in the final, 7–6^{(7–5)}, 6–2 to win the singles tennis title at the 2022 Napoli Cup. It was his second career ATP Tour singles title.

Tallon Griekspoor was the reigning champion from 2021, when the tournament was an ATP Challenger Tour event, but chose to compete in Antwerp instead.

== Seeds ==
The top four seeds received a bye into the second round.

1. (Spain) Pablo Carreño Busta (quarterfinals)
2. (Italy) Matteo Berrettini (final)
3. (Spain) Roberto Bautista Agut (second round)
4. (Italy) Lorenzo Musetti (champion)
5. (Serbia) Miomir Kecmanović (semifinals)
6. (Argentina) Sebastián Báez (second round)
7. (Spain) Albert Ramos Viñolas (first round)
8. (France) Adrian Mannarino (first round)

== Draw ==
=== Key ===
- Q = Qualifier
- WC = Wild card
- LL = Lucky loser
- Alt = Alternate
- SE = Special exempt
- PR = Protected ranking
- ITF = ITF entry
- JE = Junior exempt
- w/o = Walkover
- r = Retired
- d = Defaulted
- SR = Special ranking

=== Finals ===
Semifinals
5	(Serbia) Miomir Kecmanović	3	4
4	(Italy) Lorenzo Musetti	6	6
(United States) Mackenzie McDonald	6	6^{2}	3
2/WC	(Italy) Matteo Berrettini	3	7^{7}	6

Final
4	(Italy) Lorenzo Musetti	7^{7}	6
2/WC	(Italy) Matteo Berrettini	6^{5}	2

=== Top half ===
First round
(France) H Grenier	4	6	3
(Italy) F Fognini	6	3	6
WC	(Italy) L Nardi	7^{9}	6^{3}	2
(France) C Moutet	6^{7}	7^{7}	6
WC	(Italy) F Cobolli	1	2
5	(Serbia) M Kecmanović	6	6
(Serbia) L Đere	6	7^{8}
Q	(Croatia) B Gojo	4	6^{6}
(Spain) B Zapata Miralles	4	4
(Colombia) DE Galán	6	6
(Portugal) N Borges	7	7^{7}
7	(Spain) A Ramos Viñolas	5	6^{5}

Second round
1	(Spain) P Carreño Busta	6	6
(Italy) F Fognini	1	1
(France) C Moutet	3^{r}
5	(Serbia) M Kecmanović	5
4	(Italy) L Musetti	7	6
(Serbia) L Đere	5	3
(Colombia) DE Galán	7^{7}	6
(Portugal) N Borges	6^{5}	4

Quarterfinals
1	(Spain) P Carreño Busta	5	2
5	(Serbia) M Kecmanović	7	6
4	(Italy) L Musetti	6	6
(Colombia) DE Galán	3	0

Semifinals
5	(Serbia) M Kecmanović	3	4
4	(Italy) L Musetti	6	6

=== Bottom half ===
First round
6	(Argentina) S Báez	7	7^{7}
(Italy) L Sonego	5	6^{3}
(Hungary) M Fucsovics	4	6^{8}
Q	(China) Z Zhang	6	7^{10}
(United States) M McDonald	6	7
Q	(Italy) F Passaro	3	5
8	(France) A Mannarino	1	6	4
(Argentina) P Cachin	6	3	6
(Japan) T Daniel	6	6
(Spain) P Martínez	3	3
(Spain) R Carballés Baena	6	6
Q	(Chile) N Jarry	4	4

Second round
6	(Argentina) S Báez	6^{5}	6^{11}
Q	(China) Z Zhang	7^{7}	7^{13}
(United States) M McDonald	6	6
3	(Spain) R Bautista Agut	4	4
(Argentina) P Cachin	4	6^{2}
(Japan) T Daniel	6	7^{7}
(Spain) R Carballés Baena	4	2
2/WC	(Italy) M Berrettini	6	6

Quarterfinals
Q	(China) Z Zhang	6	3	2
(United States) M McDonald	4	6	6
(Japan) T Daniel	2	3
2/WC	(Italy) M Berrettini	6	6

Semifinals
(United States) M McDonald	6	6^{2}	3
2/WC	(Italy) M Berrettini	3	7^{7}	6

== Qualifying ==
=== Seeds ===
1. (Chile) Nicolás Jarry (qualified)
2. (China) Zhang Zhizhen (qualified)
3. (Italy) Francesco Passaro (qualified)
4. (Slovakia) Jozef Kovalík (first round, retired)
5. (Austria) Filip Misolic (qualifying competition)
6. (Italy) Andrea Pellegrino (first round)
7. (Italy) Giulio Zeppieri (qualifying competition)
8. (Italy) Raúl Brancaccio (qualifying competition)

=== Qualifiers ===
1. (Chile) Nicolás Jarry
2. (China) Zhang Zhizhen
3. (Italy) Francesco Passaro
4. (Croatia) Borna Gojo

=== Qualifying draw ===
==== First qualifier ====
First round
1	(Chile) Nicolás Jarry	6	6
(Tunisia) Aziz Dougaz	2	3
WC	(Italy) Gianmarco Ferrari	2	3
8	(Italy) Raúl Brancaccio	6	6

Qualifying competition
1	(Chile) Nicolás Jarry	6	6
8	(Italy) Raúl Brancaccio	2	4

==== Second qualifier ====
First round
2	(China) Zhang Zhizhen	6	6
(Italy) Riccardo Bonadio	4	2
(Kazakhstan) Beibit Zhukayev	4	1
7	(Italy) Giulio Zeppieri	6	6

Qualifying competition
2	(China) Zhang Zhizhen	7	3	6
7	(Italy) Giulio Zeppieri	5	6	3

==== Third qualifier ====
First round
3	(Italy) Francesco Passaro	6	4	6
(Italy) Lorenzo Giustino	3	6	4
(Italy) Francesco Maestrelli	3	4
5	(Austria) Filip Misolic	6	6

Qualifying competition
3	(Italy) Francesco Passaro	0	6	6
5	(Austria) Filip Misolic	6	3	2

==== Fourth qualifier ====
First round
4	(Slovakia) Jozef Kovalík	3	0^{r}
(Croatia) Borna Gojo	6	3
WC	(Italy) Stefano Napolitano	7	6
6	(Italy) Andrea Pellegrino	5	4

Qualifying competition
(Croatia) Borna Gojo	6	6
WC	(Italy) Stefano Napolitano	3	4
