= 2009 Tennis Napoli Cup – Doubles =

Doubles
- 2009 Tennis Napoli Cup

Final
- Champions: (Uruguay) Pablo Cuevas (Spain) David Marrero
- Runners-up: (Germany) Frank Moser (Czech Republic) Lukáš Rosol
- Score: 6–4, 6–3

Events
Singles	Doubles
← 2008 ·	Tennis Napoli Cup	· 2010 →

Tomáš Cibulec and Jaroslav Levinský were the defending champions, but only Levinský chose to participate this year.
He competed with Lovro Zovko, however they lost to Frank Moser and Lukáš Rosol in the quarterfinal.
Pablo Cuevas and David Marrero won in the final 6–4, 6–3, against Moser and Rosol.

== Seeds ==
1. (Australia) Paul Hanley / (United States) Scott Lipsky (quarterfinals)
2. (United States) James Cerretani / (Belgium) Dick Norman (quarterfinals)
3. (Czech Republic) Jaroslav Levinský / (Croatia) Lovro Zovko (quarterfinals)
4. (Austria) Daniel Köllerer / (Netherlands) Rogier Wassen (semifinals)

== Draw ==
=== Key ===
- Q = Qualifier
- WC = Wild card
- LL = Lucky loser
- Alt = Alternate
- SE = Special exempt
- PR = Protected ranking
- ITF = ITF entry
- JE = Junior exempt
- w/o = Walkover
- r = Retired
- d = Defaulted
- SR = Special ranking

=== Draw ===
First round
1	(Australia) P Hanley (United States) S Lipsky	7	7
(Germany) M Kohlmann (Germany) P Marx	6^{5}	6^{4}
(Spain) A Martín (Spain) P Riba	2	5
(Uruguay) P Cuevas (Spain) D Marrero	6	7
4	(Austria) D Köllerer (Netherlands) R Wassen	7	6
WC	(Italy) F Cipolla (Italy) G Petrazzuolo	5	3
(Switzerland) Y Allegro (Romania) H Tecău	4	4
WC	(Italy) F Aldi (Italy) A Motti	6	6
WC	(Italy) Enrico Fioravante (Italy) Antonio Maiorano	2	1
(Germany) F Moser (Czech Republic) L Rosol	6	6
(Czech Republic) D Škoch (Czech Republic) P Vízner	3	2
3	(Czech Republic) J Levinský (Croatia) L Zovko	6	6
(Kazakhstan) A Golubev (Uzbekistan) D Istomin	6	6
(Spain) P Andújar (Spain) D Gimeno-Traver	4	2
ALT	(Romania) V Crivoi (Serbia) B Pašanski	1	3
2	(United States) J Cerretani (Belgium) D Norman	6	6

Quarterfinals
1	(Australia) P Hanley (United States) S Lipsky	7	3	[4]
(Uruguay) P Cuevas (Spain) D Marrero	6^{3}	6	[10]
4	(Austria) D Köllerer (Netherlands) R Wassen	6	2	[10]
WC	(Italy) F Aldi (Italy) A Motti	2	6	[8]
(Germany) F Moser (Czech Republic) L Rosol	6	7
3	(Czech Republic) J Levinský (Croatia) L Zovko	4	5
(Kazakhstan) A Golubev (Uzbekistan) D Istomin	6	6
2	(United States) J Cerretani (Belgium) D Norman	4	2

Semifinals
(Uruguay) P Cuevas (Spain) D Marrero	6	6^{1}	[11]
4	(Austria) D Köllerer (Netherlands) R Wassen	0	7	[9]
(Germany) F Moser (Czech Republic) L Rosol	6	6
(Kazakhstan) A Golubev (Uzbekistan) D Istomin	1	1

Finals
(Uruguay) P Cuevas (Spain) D Marrero	6	6
(Germany) F Moser (Czech Republic) L Rosol	4	3
