= 2011 Tennis Napoli Cup – Doubles =

Doubles
- 2011 Tennis Napoli Cup

Final
- Champions: (United States) Travis Rettenmaier (Germany) Simon Stadler
- Runners-up: (United States) Travis Parrott (Sweden) Andreas Siljeström
- Score: 6–4, 6–4

Events
Singles	Doubles
← 2010 ·	Tennis Napoli Cup	· 2012 →

Dustin Brown and Jesse Witten were the defending champions, but they decided not to compete this year.

Travis Rettenmaier and Simon Stadler won the title, defeating Travis Parrott and Andreas Siljeström 6–4, 6–4 in the final.

== Seeds ==
1. (United States) Brian Battistone / (Philippines) Treat Conrad Huey (first round)
2. (United Kingdom) Colin Fleming / (United States) David Martin (semifinals)
3. (Australia) Rameez Junaid / (Germany) Frank Moser (first round)
4. (Russia) Michail Elgin / (Latvia) Andis Juška (quarterfinals)

== Draw ==
=== Key ===
- Q = Qualifier
- WC = Wild card
- LL = Lucky loser
- Alt = Alternate
- SE = Special exempt
- PR = Protected ranking
- ITF = ITF entry
- JE = Junior exempt
- w/o = Walkover
- r = Retired
- d = Defaulted
- SR = Special ranking

=== Draw ===
First round
1	(United States) B Battistone (Philippines) TC Huey	2	7	[4]
(South Africa) J Coetzee (Australia) J Kerr	6	5	[10]
(United States) T Rettenmaier (Germany) S Stadler	6	6
WC	(Italy) Enrico Fioravante (Italy) M Trevisan	3	1
4	(Russia) M Elgin (Latvia) A Juška	6	4	[11]
(Netherlands) T Schoorel (Netherlands) I Sijsling	4	6	[9]
(Czech Republic) L Friedl (Czech Republic) I Minář	3	6	[6]
(Belarus) U Ignatik (Italy) A Motti	6	3	[10]
(United States) T Parrott (Sweden) A Siljeström	6	6
WC	(Italy) Massimo Capone (Italy) Giacomo Pirozzi	1	3
(France) O Charroin (Australia) S Kadir	6	6
3	(Australia) R Junaid (Germany) F Moser	4	3
(France) A Gensse (France) D Guez	1	0
(Spain) G Alcaide (Spain) D Muñoz-De La Nava	6	6
WC	(Canada) P Polansky (Croatia) A Veić	w/o
2	(United Kingdom) C Fleming (United States) D Martin

Quarterfinals
(South Africa) J Coetzee (Australia) J Kerr	4	7	[5]
(United States) T Rettenmaier (Germany) S Stadler	6	5	[10]
4	(Russia) M Elgin (Latvia) A Juška	4	7^{7}	[7]
(Belarus) U Ignatik (Italy) A Motti	6	6^{5}	[10]
(United States) T Parrott (Sweden) A Siljeström	7^{7}	6
(France) O Charroin (Australia) S Kadir	6^{3}	3
(Spain) G Alcaide (Spain) D Muñoz-De La Nava	w/o
2	(United Kingdom) C Fleming (United States) D Martin

Semifinals
(United States) T Rettenmaier (Germany) S Stadler	4	6	[10]
(Belarus) U Ignatik (Italy) A Motti	6	3	[4]
(United States) T Parrott (Sweden) A Siljeström	6	6
2	(United Kingdom) C Fleming (United States) D Martin	2	4

Final
(United States) T Rettenmaier (Germany) S Stadler	6	6
(United States) T Parrott (Sweden) A Siljeström	4	4
