= 2026 Napoli Tennis Cup – Doubles =

Doubles
- 2026 Napoli Tennis Cup

Final
- Champions: (Switzerland) Jakub Paul (Czech Republic) Matěj Vocel
- Runners-up: (Germany) Tim Rühl (Netherlands) Mick Veldheer
- Score: 6–2, 6–4

Events
Singles	Doubles
- Napoli Tennis Cup

Alexander Erler and Constantin Frantzen were the defending champions but chose not to defend their title.

Jakub Paul and Matěj Vocel won the title after defeating Tim Rühl and Mick Veldheer 6–2, 6–4 in the final.

== Seeds ==
1. (Netherlands) Bart Stevens / (Belgium) Joran Vliegen (first round)
2. (Belgium) Sander Gillé / (Netherlands) Sem Verbeek (quarterfinals)
3. (Switzerland) Jakub Paul / (Czech Republic) Matěj Vocel (champions)
4. (Ecuador) Gonzalo Escobar / (Croatia) Nino Serdarušić (quarterfinals)

== Draw ==
Key

- Q = Qualifier
- WC = Wild card
- LL = Lucky loser
- Alt = Alternate
- ITF = ITF entry
- PR = Protected ranking
- SR = Special ranking
- SE = Special exempt
- JE = Junior exempt
- JR = Junior Accelerator Programme entrant
- CO = College Accelerator Programme entrant
- NG = Next Gen Accelerator Program entrant
- w/o = Walkover
- r = Retired
- d = Defaulted

First round
1	(Netherlands) B Stevens (Belgium) J Vliegen	6^{7}	4
(Germany) T Rühl (Netherlands) M Veldheer	7^{9}	6
(Thailand) P Isaro (India) N Kaliyanda Poonacha	6	6
(Netherlands) J Jans (Czech Republic) D Poljak	4	3
4	(Ecuador) G Escobar (Croatia) N Serdarušić	6	6
(Czech Republic) F Duda (Serbia) S Latinović	1	4
(Ukraine) V Sachko (Poland) S Walków	7^{7}	6
(Czech Republic) V Kopřiva (India) S Nagal	6^{4}	3
WC	(Italy) F Bondioli (Italy) CA Caniato	4	2
(Germany) H Jebens (Spain) D Vega Hernández	6	6
WC	(Italy) F Forti (Italy) J Vasamì	5	1
3	(Switzerland) J Paul (Czech Republic) M Vocel	7	6
(Sweden) E Grevelius (Sweden) A Heinonen	6	7^{7}
(France) G Blancaneaux (France) U Blanchet	4	6^{5}
(Italy) A Pellegrino (Italy) S Travaglia	3	3
2	(Belgium) S Gillé (Netherlands) S Verbeek	6	6

Quarterfinals
(Germany) T Rühl (Netherlands) M Veldheer	6	6^{4}	[10]
(Thailand) P Isaro (India) N Kaliyanda Poonacha	1	7^{7}	[7]
4	(Ecuador) G Escobar (Croatia) N Serdarušić	5	6	[4]
(Ukraine) V Sachko (Poland) S Walków	7	3	[10]
(Germany) H Jebens (Spain) D Vega Hernández	4	4
3	(Switzerland) J Paul (Czech Republic) M Vocel	6	6
(Sweden) E Grevelius (Sweden) A Heinonen	6	6^{1}	[10]
2	(Belgium) S Gillé (Netherlands) S Verbeek	2	7^{7}	[7]

Semifinals
(Germany) T Rühl (Netherlands) M Veldheer	7	6
(Ukraine) V Sachko (Poland) S Walków	5	2
3	(Switzerland) J Paul (Czech Republic) M Vocel	6	6
(Sweden) E Grevelius (Sweden) A Heinonen	4	2

Final
(Germany) T Rühl (Netherlands) M Veldheer	2	4
3	(Switzerland) J Paul (Czech Republic) M Vocel	6	6
