= 2012 Tennis Napoli Cup =

- Date: 23–29 April
- Edition: 16th
- Surface: Clay
- Location: Naples, Italy

Champions

Singles
- (Russia) Andrey Kuznetsov

Doubles
- (Lithuania) Laurynas Grigelis / (Italy) Alessandro Motti
← 2011 ·	Tennis Napoli Cup	· 2013 →

The 2012 Tennis Napoli Cup was a professional tennis tournament played on clay courts. It was the 16th edition of the tournament which was part of the 2012 ATP Challenger Tour. It took place in Naples, Italy between 23 and 29 April 2012.

== ATP entrants ==
=== Seeds ===
Country	Player	Rank^{1}	Seed
LUX	Gilles Müller	62	1
ITA	Simone Bolelli	105	2
NED	Igor Sijsling	120	3
FRA	Adrian Mannarino	128	4
ITA	Alessandro Giannessi	136	5
NED	Thomas Schoorel	145	6
GER	Dustin Brown	151	7
FRA	Florent Serra	153	8

- ^{1} Rankings are as of April 16, 2012.

=== Other entrants ===
The following players received wildcards into the singles main draw:

- (Italy) Marco Cecchinato
- (Italy) Enrico Fioravante
- (Italy) Federico Gaio
- (Italy) Stefano Napolitano

The following players received entry from the qualifying draw:

- (Italy) Riccardo Bellotti
- (Switzerland) Adrien Bossel
- (Czech Republic) Roman Jebavý
- (Russia) Mikhail Ledovskikh

== Champions ==
=== Singles ===
- (Russia) Andrey Kuznetsov def. (France) Jonathan Dasnières de Veigy, 7–6^{(8–6)}, 7–6^{(8–6)}

=== Doubles ===
- (Lithuania) Laurynas Grigelis / (Italy) Alessandro Motti def. (Australia) Rameez Junaid / (Slovakia) Igor Zelenay, 6–4, 6–4
