= 2013 Tennis Napoli Cup – Singles =

Singles
- 2013 Tennis Napoli Cup

Final
- Champion: (Italy) Potito Starace
- Runner-up: (Italy) Alessandro Giannessi
- Score: 6–2, 2–0 ret.

Events
Singles	Doubles
← 2012 ·	Tennis Napoli Cup	· 2014 →

Andrey Kuznetsov was the defending champion but chose to compete at the 2013 Portugal Open.
Potito Starace was leading Alessandro Giannessi 6–2, 2–0 in the final before Giannessi retired.

== Seeds ==
1. (Slovenia) Blaž Kavčič (second round)
2. (France) Adrian Mannarino (quarterfinals)
3. (France) Marc Gicquel (second round)
4. (Italy) Filippo Volandri (semifinals)
5. (France) Jonathan Dasnières de Veigy (quarterfinals)
6. (Germany) Julian Reister (first round)
7. (Serbia) Dušan Lajović (quarterfinals)
8. (Germany) Bastian Knittel (second round)

== Draw ==
=== Key ===
- Q = Qualifier
- WC = Wild card
- LL = Lucky loser
- Alt = Alternate
- SE = Special exempt
- PR = Protected ranking
- ITF = ITF entry
- JE = Junior exempt
- w/o = Walkover
- r = Retired
- d = Defaulted
- SR = Special ranking

=== Finals ===
Semifinals
(Italy) Alessandro Giannessi	7^{7}	5	7^{7}
4	(Italy) Filippo Volandri	6^{2}	7	6^{4}
(Italy) Potito Starace	6	6
(France) David Guez	1	4

Final
(Italy) Alessandro Giannessi	2	0^{r}
(Italy) Potito Starace	6	2

=== Top half ===
First round
1/WC	(Slovenia) B Kavčič	6	6
WC	(Italy) G Quinzi	3	2
Q	(Netherlands) W Koolhof	7^{7}	0	2
(Italy) A Giannessi	6^{4}	6	6
(Netherlands) M Middelkoop	6	4	4
WC	(Italy) R Bellotti	1	6	6
LL	(Serbia) N Čačić	3	4
5	(France) J Dasnières de Veigy	6	6
4	(Italy) F Volandri	4	6	7
(Spain) J Samper-Montaña	6	4	5
Q	(Italy) M Cecchinato	7	3	2
(Italy) G Naso	5	6	6
(Belgium) Y Mertens	3	2
(Italy) S Vagnozzi	6	6
Q	(Sweden) A Vinciguerra	4	3
7	(Serbia) D Lajović	6	6

Second round
1/WC	(Slovenia) B Kavčič	4	4
(Italy) A Giannessi	6	6
WC	(Italy) R Bellotti	6	4	6^{1}
5	(France) J Dasnières de Veigy	3	6	7^{7}
4	(Italy) F Volandri	6	7
(Italy) G Naso	1	5
(Italy) S Vagnozzi	1	3
7	(Serbia) D Lajović	6	6

Quarterfinals
(Italy) A Giannessi	7^{7}	6
5	(France) J Dasnières de Veigy	6^{3}	2
4	(Italy) F Volandri	6	6
7	(Serbia) D Lajović	4	3

Semifinals
(Italy) A Giannessi	7^{7}	5	7^{7}
4	(Italy) F Volandri	6^{2}	7	6^{4}

=== Bottom half ===
First round
6	(Germany) J Reister	4	6^{3}
(Kazakhstan) A Golubev	6	7^{7}
Alt	(Argentina) Leandro Migani	0	1
WC	(Italy) Edoardo Eremin	6	6
(Italy) P Starace	6	3	6
(France) P-H Herbert	4	6	3
Q	(Italy) Omar Giacalone	6^{2}	6	6^{3}
3	(France) M Gicquel	7^{7}	2	7^{7}
8	(Germany) B Knittel	6	6
LL	(Italy) W Trusendi	3	3
(France) D Guez	4	6	6
(Spain) Marc Giner	6	3	2
(France) M Teixeira	2	6	1
(Belgium) A De Greef	6	3	6
(Italy) T Fabbiano	4	6	4
2	(France) A Mannarino	6	2	6

Second round
(Kazakhstan) A Golubev	7^{7}	2
WC	(Italy) E Eremin	6^{3}	0^{r}
(Italy) P Starace	6	6
3	(France) M Gicquel	1	2
8	(Germany) B Knittel	4	5
(France) D Guez	6	7
(Belgium) A De Greef	6	5	2
2	(France) A Mannarino	2	7	6

Quarterfinals
(Kazakhstan) A Golubev	0	4
(Italy) P Starace	6	6
(France) D Guez	7^{7}	6
2	(France) A Mannarino	6^{1}	1

Semifinals
(Italy) P Starace	6	6
(France) D Guez	1	4
