= 2010 Tennis Napoli Cup =

Tennis tournament

- Date: March 29 – April 4
- Edition: 14th
- Location: Naples, Italy

Champions

Singles
- (Portugal) Rui Machado

Doubles
- (Jamaica) Dustin Brown / (United States) Jesse Witten
← 2009 ·	Tennis Napoli Cup	· 2011 →

The 2010 Tennis Napoli Cup was a professional tennis tournament played on outdoor red clay courts. It was part of the 2010 ATP Challenger Tour. It took place in Naples, Italy between 29 March and 4 April 2010.

== ATP entrants ==
=== Seeds ===
Nationality	Player	Ranking*	Seeding-
ITA	Potito Starace	73	1
ITA	Paolo Lorenzi	90	2
KAZ	Andrey Golubev	93	3
SLO	Blaž Kavčič	96	4
RUS	Igor Kunitsyn	100	5
ESP	Pere Riba	117	6
ROU	Victor Crivoi	118	7
POR	Rui Machado	119	8

- Rankings are as of March 22, 2010.

=== Other entrants ===
The following players received wildcards into the singles main draw:

- (Italy) Thomas Fabbiano
- (Italy) Potito Starace
- (Australia) Bernard Tomic
- (Italy) Matteo Trevisan

The following players received entry from the qualifying draw:

- (Chile) Jorge Aguilar
- (Italy) Francesco Aldi
- (Italy) Andrea Arnaboldi
- (Chile) Adrián García

The following players received the lucky spots:

- (Argentina) Martín Alund
- (Argentina) Juan-Martín Aranguren

== Champions ==
=== Singles ===
(Portugal) Rui Machado def. (Argentina) Federico del Bonis, 6–4, 6–4

=== Doubles ===
(Jamaica) Dustin Brown / (United States) Jesse Witten def. (India) Rohan Bopanna / (Pakistan) Aisam-ul-Haq Qureshi, 7–6(4), 7–5
