= 2016 Capri Watch Cup =

- Date: 4–10 April
- Edition: 19th
- Draw: 32S / 16D
- Prize money: €42,500+H
- Surface: Clay
- Location: Naples, Italy

Champions

Singles
- (Slovakia) Jozef Kovalík

Doubles
- (Germany) Gero Kretschmer / (Germany) Alexander Satschko
← 2015 ·	Capri Watch Cup	· 2021 →

The 2016 Capri Watch Cup was a professional tennis tournament played on clay courts. It was the 19th edition of the tournament which was part of the 2016 ATP Challenger Tour. It took place in Naples, Italy between 4 April and 10 April 2016.

== Singles main-draw entrants ==
=== Seeds ===
Country	Player	Rank^{1}	Seed
SRB	Filip Krajinović	103	1
BRA	Rogério Dutra Silva	105	2
GER	Jan-Lennard Struff	109	3
ITA	Thomas Fabbiano	110	4
ESP	Roberto Carballés Baena	114	5
POR	Gastão Elias	121	6
SVK	Andrej Martin	127	7
BIH	Mirza Bašić	128	8

- ^{1} Rankings as of March 21, 2016.

=== Other entrants ===
The following players received wildcards into the singles main draw:

- (Italy) Salvatore Caruso
- (Italy) Federico Gaio
- (Italy) Gianluca Mager
- (Italy) Stefano Napolitano

The following player received entry into the singles main draw as a special exempt:

- (France) Alexandre Sidorenko

The following players received entry from the qualifying draw:

- (Italy) Flavio Cipolla
- (Bulgaria) Dimitar Kuzmanov
- (Germany) Julian Reister
- (Russia) Alexey Vatutin

== Champions ==
=== Singles ===
- (Slovakia) Jozef Kovalík def. (Belgium) Arthur De Greef, 6–3, 6–2

=== Doubles ===
- (Germany) Gero Kretschmer / (Germany) Alexander Satschko def. (Italy) Matteo Donati / (Italy) Stefano Napolitano, 6–1, 6–3
