= 2009 Tennis Napoli Cup =

- Date: March 30 – April 5
- Edition: 13th
- Location: Naples, Italy

Champions

Singles
- (Uruguay) Pablo Cuevas

Doubles
- (Uruguay) Pablo Cuevas / (Spain) David Marrero
← 2008 ·	Tennis Napoli Cup	· 2010 →

The 2009 Tennis Napoli Cup was a professional tennis tournament played on outdoor red clay courts. It was part of the 2009 ATP Challenger Tour. It took place in Naples, Italy between 30 March and 5 April 2009.

== Singles entrants ==
=== Seeds ===
Nationality	Player	Ranking*	Seeding
ITA	Potito Starace	70	1
ESP	Alberto Martín	78	2
ESP	Daniel Gimeno Traver	79	3
ESP	Pablo Andújar	81	4
BEL	Kristof Vliegen	90	5
BRA	Marcos Daniel	93	6
CZE	Ivo Minář	96	7
AUT	Daniel Köllerer	103	8

- Rankings are as of March 23, 2009.

=== Other entrants ===
The following players received wildcards into the singles main draw:

- (Italy) Fabio Fognini
- (Italy) Stefano Galvani
- (Italy) Enrico Fioravante
- (Italy) Giancarlo Petrazzuolo

The following players received entry from the qualifying draw:

- (Argentina) Federico Delbonis
- (Ukraine) Oleksandr Dolgopolov Jr.
- (Czech Republic) Jan Hájek
- (Germany) Florian Mayer

The following player received special exempt into the main draw:

- (Austria) Andreas Haider-Maurer
- (Spain) David Marrero

== Champions ==
=== Men's singles ===
(Uruguay) Pablo Cuevas def. (Romania) Victor Crivoi, 6–1, 6–3

=== Men's doubles ===
(Uruguay) Pablo Cuevas / (Spain) David Marrero def. (Czech Republic) Lukáš Rosol / (Germany) Frank Moser, 6–4, 6–3
