= 2021 Tennis Napoli Cup =

- Date: 4–10 October
- Edition: 20th
- Surface: Clay
- Location: Naples, Italy

Champions

Singles
- (Netherlands) Tallon Griekspoor

Doubles
- (Germany) Dustin Brown / (Italy) Andrea Vavassori
← 2016 ·	Tennis Napoli Cup	· 2022 →

The 2021 Tennis Napoli Cup was a professional tennis tournament played on clay courts. It was the 20th edition of the tournament which was part of the 2021 ATP Challenger Tour. It took place in Naples, Italy between 4 and 10 October 2021.

== Singles main-draw entrants ==
=== Seeds ===
Country	Player	Rank^{1}	Seed
ITA	Stefano Travaglia	97	1
SVK	Andrej Martin	122	2
GER	Yannick Hanfmann	123	3
NED	Tallon Griekspoor	131	4
CZE	Zdeněk Kolář	148	5
ITA	Alessandro Giannessi	181	6
ITA	Gian Marco Moroni	205	7
ITA	Lorenzo Giustino	213	8

- ^{1} Rankings as of 27 September 2021.

=== Other entrants ===
The following players received wildcards into the singles main draw:

- (Italy) Matteo Arnaldi
- (Italy) Jacopo Berrettini
- (Italy) Luca Nardi

The following player received entry into the singles main draw using a protected ranking:

- (Italy) Filippo Baldi

The following player received entry into the singles main draw as an alternate:

- (Serbia) Miljan Zekić

The following players received entry from the qualifying draw:

- (Romania) Bogdan Ionuț Apostol
- (Italy) Raúl Brancaccio
- (Italy) Marco Miceli
- (Italy) Julian Ocleppo

The following players received entry as lucky losers:

- (Romania) ~~Alexandru Jecan~~
- (Greece) Petros Tsitsipas

== Champions ==
=== Singles ===
- (Netherlands) Tallon Griekspoor def. (Italy) Andrea Pellegrino 6–3, 6–2.

=== Doubles ===
- (Germany) Dustin Brown / (Italy) Andrea Vavassori def. (Bosnia and Herzegovina) Mirza Bašić / (Croatia) Nino Serdarušić 7–5, 7–6^{(7–5)}.
