= 2011 Tennis Napoli Cup =

- Date: 18–24 April
- Edition: 15th
- Location: Naples, Italy

Champions

Singles
- (Netherlands) Thomas Schoorel

Doubles
- (United States) Travis Rettenmaier / (Germany) Simon Stadler
← 2010 ·	Tennis Napoli Cup	· 2012 →

The 2011 Tennis Napoli Cup was a professional tennis tournament played on clay courts. It was the 15th edition of the tournament which was part of the 2011 ATP Challenger Tour. It took place in Naples, Italy, between 18 and 24 April 2011.

== Singles main draw entrants ==
=== Seeds ===
Country	Player	Rank^{1}	Seed
FRA	Jérémy Chardy	54	1
ITA	Filippo Volandri	76	2
POR	Frederico Gil	82	3
AUT	Andreas Haider-Maurer	95	4
CZE	Ivo Minář	130	5
BEL	Steve Darcis	140	6
ITA	Alessio di Mauro	141	7
ESP	Daniel Muñoz de la Nava	153	8

- Rankings are as of 11 April 2011.

=== Other entrants ===
The following players received wildcards into the singles main draw:

- (France) Jérémy Chardy
- (Italy) Enrico Fioravante
- (Austria) Thomas Muster
- (Italy) Matteo Trevisan

The following players received entry from the qualifying draw:

- (Italy) Enrico Burzi
- (Slovakia) Pavol Červenák
- (United Kingdom) Daniel Smethurst
- (United States) Michael Yani

== Champions ==
=== Singles ===
(Netherlands) Thomas Schoorel def. (Italy) Filippo Volandri, 6–2, 7–6(4)

=== Doubles ===
(United States) Travis Rettenmaier / (Germany) Simon Stadler def. (United States) Travis Parrott / (Sweden) Andreas Siljeström, 6–4, 6–4
