= 2015 Tennis Napoli Cup =

- Date: 6 – 12 April
- Edition: 18th
- Draw: 32S / 16D
- Prize money: €106,500+H
- Surface: Clay
- Location: Naples, Italy

Champions

Singles
- (Spain) Daniel Muñoz de la Nava

Doubles
- (Serbia) Ilija Bozoljac / (Serbia) Filip Krajinović
← 2013 ·	Tennis Napoli Cup	· 2016 →

The 2015 Tennis Napoli Cup was a professional tennis tournament played on clay courts. It was the 18th edition of the tournament which was part of the 2015 ATP Challenger Tour. It took place in Naples, Italy between 6 April and 12 April 2015.

== Singles main-draw entrants ==
=== Seeds ===
Country	Player	Rank^{1}	Seed
KAZ	Andrey Golubev	89	1
SRB	Filip Krajinović	96	2
SLO	Blaž Rola	101	3
ESP	Albert Montañés	105	4
NED	Thiemo de Bakker	120	5
SVK	Norbert Gombos	122	6
HUN	Márton Fucsovics	154	7
ITA	Marco Cecchinato	155	8

- ^{1} Rankings are as of March 23, 2015.

=== Other entrants ===
The following players received wildcards into the singles main draw:

- (Italy) Matteo Donati
- (Italy) Federico Gaio
- (Italy) Gianluigi Quinzi
- (Italy) Filippo Volandri

The following players received entry from the qualifying draw:

- (Monaco) Benjamin Balleret
- (Italy) Flavio Cipolla
- (Italy) Thomas Fabbiano
- (France) Alexis Musialek

== Champions ==
=== Singles ===
- (Spain) Daniel Muñoz de la Nava def. (Italy) Matteo Donati, 6–2, 6–1

=== Doubles ===
- (Serbia) Ilija Bozoljac / (Serbia) Filip Krajinović def. (Georgia (country)) Nikoloz Basilashvili / (Belarus) Aliaksandr Bury, 6–1, 6–2
