= 2022 Tennis Napoli Cup – Doubles =

Doubles
- 2022 Tennis Napoli Cup

Final
- Champions: (Croatia) Ivan Dodig (United States) Austin Krajicek
- Runners-up: (Australia) Matthew Ebden (Australia) John Peers
- Score: 6–3, 1–6, [10–8]

Events
Singles	Doubles
- Tennis Napoli Cup

Ivan Dodig and Austin Krajicek defeated Matthew Ebden and John Peers in the final, 6–3, 1–6, [10–8] to win the doubles tennis title at the 2022 Tennis Napoli Cup.

Dustin Brown and Andrea Vavassori were the reigning champions from 2021, when the tournament was an ATP Challenger Tour event, but only Vavassori chose to defend his title, partnering Lorenzo Sonego. Vavassori lost in the semifinals to Dodig and Krajicek.

== Seeds ==
1. (Croatia) Ivan Dodig / (United States) Austin Krajicek (champions)
2. (Italy) Simone Bolelli / (Italy) Fabio Fognini (first round)
3. (Australia) Matthew Ebden / (Australia) John Peers (final)
4. (Brazil) Rafael Matos / (Spain) David Vega Hernández (first round)

== Draw ==
Key

- Q = Qualifier
- WC = Wild card
- LL = Lucky loser
- Alt = Alternate
- ITF = ITF entry
- PR = Protected ranking
- SR = Special ranking
- SE = Special exempt
- JE = Junior exempt
- JR = Junior Accelerator Programme entrant
- CO = College Accelerator Programme entrant
- NG = Next Gen Accelerator Program entrant
- w/o = Walkover
- r = Retired
- d = Defaulted

=== Draw ===
First round
1	(Croatia) I Dodig (United States) A Krajicek	6	6
(Spain) P Martínez (Spain) B Zapata Miralles	3	2
(Argentina) P Cachin (Spain) R Carballés Baena	4	6	[10]
WC	(Italy) S Napolitano (Italy) A Pellegrino	6	4	[5]
4	(Brazil) R Matos (Spain) D Vega Hernández	6	1	[4]
(Bosnia and Herzegovina) T Brkić (Ecuador) G Escobar	4	6	[10]
(Spain) A Ramos Viñolas (Colombia) DE Galán	5	2
(Italy) L Sonego (Italy) A Vavassori	7	6
(France) S Doumbia (France) F Reboul	6	6
(Portugal) F Cabral (United Kingdom) J Murray	3	1
WC	(Italy) F Maestrelli (Italy) F Passaro	1	4
3	(Australia) M Ebden (Australia) J Peers	6	6
(Colombia) N Barrientos (Mexico) MÁ Reyes-Varela	5	2
(Serbia) N Ćaćić (Pakistan) A-u-H Qureshi	7	6
(France) A Mannarino (France) F Martin	6	6
2	(Italy) S Bolelli (Italy) F Fognini	1	4

Quarterfinals
1	(Croatia) I Dodig (United States) A Krajicek	6	6
(Argentina) P Cachin (Spain) R Carballés Baena	1	1
(Bosnia and Herzegovina) T Brkić (Ecuador) G Escobar	4	5
(Italy) L Sonego (Italy) A Vavassori	6	7
(France) S Doumbia (France) F Reboul	7	4	[4]
3	(Australia) M Ebden (Australia) J Peers	5	6	[10]
(Serbia) N Ćaćić (Pakistan) A-u-H Qureshi	6	3	[10]
(France) A Mannarino (France) F Martin	2	6	[7]

Semifinals
1	(Croatia) I Dodig (United States) A Krajicek	6^{8}	6	[11]
(Italy) L Sonego (Italy) A Vavassori	7^{10}	3	[9]
3	(Australia) M Ebden (Australia) J Peers	6	7
(Serbia) N Ćaćić (Pakistan) A-u-H Qureshi	3	5

Final
1	(Croatia) I Dodig (United States) A Krajicek	6	1	[10]
3	(Australia) M Ebden (Australia) J Peers	3	6	[8]
