= 2016 Capri Watch Cup – Doubles =

Doubles
- 2016 Capri Watch Cup

Final
- Champion: (Germany) Gero Kretschmer (Germany) Alexander Satschko
- Runner-up: (Italy) Matteo Donati (Italy) Stefano Napolitano
- Score: 6–1, 6–3

Events
Singles	Doubles
- Capri Watch Cup

Ilija Bozoljac and Filip Krajinović were the defending champions, but only Krajinović returned to defend his title, partnering Mirza Bašić. They lost in the first round to Johan Brunström and Andreas Siljeström.

Gero Kretschmer and Alexander Satschko won the title after defeating Matteo Donati and Stefano Napolitano 6–1, 6–3 in the final.

== Seeds ==
1. (Belarus) Aliaksandr Bury / (Canada) Adil Shamasdin (quarterfinals)
2. (Australia) Rameez Junaid / (United Kingdom) Ken Skupski (semifinals)
3. (Slovakia) Andrej Martin / (Chile) Hans Podlipnik (quarterfinals)
4. (Sweden) Johan Brunström / (Sweden) Andreas Siljeström (quarterfinals)

== Draw ==
Key

- Q = Qualifier
- WC = Wild card
- LL = Lucky loser
- Alt = Alternate
- ITF = ITF entry
- PR = Protected ranking
- SR = Special ranking
- SE = Special exempt
- JE = Junior exempt
- JR = Junior Accelerator Programme entrant
- CO = College Accelerator Programme entrant
- NG = Next Gen Accelerator Program entrant
- w/o = Walkover
- r = Retired
- d = Defaulted

First round
1	(Belarus) A Bury (Canada) A Shamasdin	4	7	[12]
(Italy) A Arnaboldi (Italy) F Cipolla	6	5	[10]
PR	(Poland) T Bednarek (Italy) A Giannessi	7^{7}	6
WC	(Italy) Edoardo Eremin (Italy) L Sonego	6^{1}	3
4	(Sweden) J Brunström (Sweden) A Siljeström	6	6
(Bosnia and Herzegovina) M Bašić (Serbia) F Krajinović	3	3
WC	(Italy) M Donati (Italy) S Napolitano	6	6
(Germany) F Moser (Austria) P Oswald	4	4
PR	(Netherlands) S Arends (Germany) J Reister	3	1
(Germany) G Kretschmer (Germany) A Satschko	6	6
(Brazil) R Dutra Silva (Hungary) M Fucsovics	4	2
3	(Slovakia) A Martin (Chile) H Podlipnik	6	6
(Poland) M Kowalczyk (Poland) A Majchrowicz	6	6
WC	(Italy) S Caruso (Italy) G Naso	4	2
Alt	(Romania) M Copil (Romania) A Ungur	6^{2}	4
2	(Australia) R Junaid (United Kingdom) K Skupski	7^{7}	6

Quarterfinals
1	(Belarus) A Bury (Canada) A Shamasdin	6^{3}	1
PR	(Poland) T Bednarek (Italy) A Giannessi	7^{7}	6
4	(Sweden) J Brunström (Sweden) A Siljeström	6^{3}	6	[7]
WC	(Italy) M Donati (Italy) S Napolitano	7^{7}	3	[10]
(Germany) G Kretschmer (Germany) A Satschko	6^{5}	7^{7}	[10]
3	(Slovakia) A Martin (Chile) H Podlipnik	7^{7}	6^{5}	[6]
(Poland) M Kowalczyk (Poland) A Majchrowicz	6	4^{d}
2	(Australia) R Junaid (United Kingdom) K Skupski	3	4

Semifinals
PR	(Poland) T Bednarek (Italy) A Giannessi	3	2
WC	(Italy) M Donati (Italy) S Napolitano	6	6
(Germany) G Kretschmer (Germany) A Satschko	6	3	[10]
2	(Australia) R Junaid (United Kingdom) K Skupski	0	6	[8]

Final
WC	(Italy) M Donati (Italy) S Napolitano	1	3
(Germany) G Kretschmer (Germany) A Satschko	6	6
