= 2013 Tennis Napoli Cup – Doubles =

Doubles
- 2013 Tennis Napoli Cup

Final
- Champions: (Italy) Stefano Ianni (Italy) Potito Starace
- Runners-up: (Italy) Alessandro Giannessi (Kazakhstan) Andrey Golubev
- Score: 6–1, 6–3

Events
Singles	Doubles
- Tennis Napoli Cup

Laurynas Grigelis and Alessandro Motti were the defending champions but Grigelis decided not to participate.

Motti chose to compete with Simone Vagnozzi, but they lost to Alessandro Giannessi and Andrey Golubev in the quarterfinals.

Stefano Ianni and Potito Starace defeated Giannessi and Golubev 6–1, 6–3 in the final to win the title.

== Seeds ==
1. (United States) James Cerretani / (Canada) Adil Shamasdin (withdrew)
2. (Italy) Stefano Ianni / (Italy) Potito Starace (champions)
3. (Australia) Jordan Kerr / (Brazil) André Sá (semifinals)
4. (Netherlands) Stephan Fransen / (Netherlands) Wesley Koolhof (quarterfinals)

== Draw ==
Key

- Q = Qualifier
- WC = Wild card
- LL = Lucky loser
- Alt = Alternate
- ITF = ITF entry
- PR = Protected ranking
- SR = Special ranking
- SE = Special exempt
- JE = Junior exempt
- JR = Junior Accelerator Programme entrant
- CO = College Accelerator Programme entrant
- NG = Next Gen Accelerator Program entrant
- w/o = Walkover
- r = Retired
- d = Defaulted

=== Draw ===
First round
(Italy) A Motti (Italy) S Vagnozzi	6	6
(Spain) Marc Giner (Spain) J Samper-Montaña	2	2
(France) J Dasnières de Veigy (France) M Gicquel	2	4
(Italy) A Giannessi (Kazakhstan) A Golubev	6	6
4	(Netherlands) S Fransen (Netherlands) W Koolhof	3	6	[10]
(Belgium) A De Greef (Belgium) Y Mertens	6	4	[4]
WC	(Italy) Giuseppe Abbate (Italy) Vincenzo Santonastaso	0	0
(Spain) MÁ López Jaén (Spain) Jordi Marse-Vidri	6	6
(France) D Guez (France) M Teixeira	1	6	[10]
Alt	(Italy) T Fabbiano (Italy) W Trusendi	6	1	[5]
WC	(Italy) Omar Giacalone (Italy) G Naso	2	5
3	(Australia) J Kerr (Brazil) A Sá	6	7
(Germany) B Knittel (Germany) J Reister	3	6^{5}
(Denmark) F Nielsen (Sweden) A Vinciguerra	6	7^{7}
(Netherlands) M Middelkoop (Argentina) Leandro Migani	2	4
2	(Italy) S Ianni (Italy) P Starace	6	6

Quarterfinals
(Italy) A Motti (Italy) S Vagnozzi	2	7^{7}	[5]
(Italy) A Giannessi (Kazakhstan) A Golubev	6	6^{4}	[10]
4	(Netherlands) S Fransen (Netherlands) W Koolhof	7^{7}	1	[8]
(Spain) MÁ López Jaén (Spain) J Marse-Vidri	6^{3}	6	[10]
(France) D Guez (France) M Teixeira	1	3
3	(Australia) J Kerr (Brazil) A Sá	6	6
(Denmark) F Nielsen (Sweden) A Vinciguerra	5	4
2	(Italy) S Ianni (Italy) P Starace	7	6

Semifinals
(Italy) A Giannessi (Kazakhstan) A Golubev	7	6
(Spain) MÁ López Jaén (Spain) J Marse-Vidri	5	3
3	(Australia) J Kerr (Brazil) A Sá	5	2
2	(Italy) S Ianni (Italy) P Starace	7	6

Final
(Italy) A Giannessi (Kazakhstan) A Golubev	1	3
2	(Italy) S Ianni (Italy) P Starace	6	6
