= 2013 Tennis Napoli Cup =

- Date: 29 April – 5 May
- Edition: 17th
- Draw: 32S / 16D
- Prize money: €30,000+H
- Surface: Clay
- Location: Naples, Italy

Champions

Singles
- (Italy) Potito Starace

Doubles
- (Italy) Stefano Ianni / (Italy) Potito Starace
← 2012 ·	Tennis Napoli Cup	· 2015 →

The 2013 Tennis Napoli Cup was a professional tennis tournament played on clay courts. It was the 17th edition of the tournament which was part of the 2013 ATP Challenger Tour. It took place in Naples, Italy between 29 April and 5 May 2013.

== Singles main draw entrants ==
=== Seeds ===
Country	Player	Rank^{1}	Seed
SLO	Blaž Kavčič	84	1
FRA	Adrian Mannarino	107	2
FRA	Marc Gicquel	118	3
ITA	Filippo Volandri	122	4
FRA	Jonathan Dasnières de Veigy	149	5
GER	Julian Reister	154	6
SRB	Dušan Lajović	155	7
GER	Bastian Knittel	184	8

- ^{1} Rankings are as of April 22, 2013.

=== Other entrants ===
The following players received wildcards into the singles main draw:

- (Italy) Riccardo Bellotti
- (Italy) Edoardo Eremin
- (Slovenia) Blaž Kavčič
- (Italy) Gianluigi Quinzi

The following players received entry as an alternate into the singles main draw:

- (Argentina) Leandro Migani

The following players received entry from the qualifying draw:

- (Italy) Marco Cecchinato
- (Italy) Omar Giacalone
- (Netherlands) Wesley Koolhof
- (Sweden) Andreas Vinciguerra

The following players received entry as lucky losers:

- (Serbia) Nikola Čačić
- (Italy) Walter Trusendi

== Doubles main draw entrants ==
=== Seeds ===
Country	Player	Country	Player	Rank^{1}	Seed
USA	James Cerretani	CAN	Adil Shamasdin	158	1
ITA	Stefano Ianni	ITA	Potito Starace	199	2
AUS	Jordan Kerr	BRA	André Sá	202	3
NED	Stephan Fransen	NED	Wesley Koolhof	508	4

- ^{1} Rankings as of April 22, 2013.

=== Other entrants ===
The following pairs received wildcards into the doubles main draw:

- (Italy) Omar Giacalone / (Italy) Gianluca Naso
- (Italy) Giuseppe Abbate / (Italy) Vincenzo Santonastaso

The following pairs received entry as an alternate into the doubles main draw:

- (Italy) Thomas Fabbiano / (Italy) Walter Trusendi

== Champions ==
=== Singles ===
- (Italy) Potito Starace def. (Italy) Alessandro Giannessi, 6–2, 2–0 ret.

=== Doubles ===
- (Italy) Stefano Ianni / (Italy) Potito Starace def. (Italy) Alessandro Giannessi / (Kazakhstan) Andrey Golubev, 6–1, 6–3
