= 2024 Tennis Napoli Cup =

- Date: 25–31 March
- Edition: 22nd
- Surface: Clay / outdoor
- Location: Naples, Italy
- Venue: Tennis Club Napoli

Champions

Singles
- (Italy) Luca Nardi

Doubles
- (Argentina) Guido Andreozzi / (Mexico) Miguel Ángel Reyes-Varela
- Napoli Tennis Cup

The 2024 Napoli Tennis Cup was a professional men's tennis tournament played on outdoor clay courts. It was the 22nd edition of the tournament, and part of the 2024 ATP Challenger Tour. It took place at the Tennis Club Napoli in Naples, Italy from 25 to 31 March 2024.

== Champions ==
=== Singles ===
- (Italy) Luca Nardi def. (France) Pierre-Hugues Herbert 5–7, 7–6^{(7–3)}, 6–2.

=== Doubles ===
- (Argentina) Guido Andreozzi / (Mexico) Miguel Ángel Reyes-Varela def. (France) Théo Arribagé / (Romania) Victor Vlad Cornea 6–4, 1–6, [10–7].

== Singles main-draw entrants ==
=== Seeds ===
Country	Player	Rank^{1}	Seed
ARG	Federico Coria	87	1
ITA	Luca Nardi	96	2
GER	Maximilian Marterer	102	3
ITA	Fabio Fognini	103	4
FRA	Corentin Moutet	107	5
HUN	Zsombor Piros	108	6
ITA	Matteo Gigante	149	7
FRA	Pierre-Hugues Herbert	160	8

- Rankings are as of 18 March 2024.

=== Other entrants ===
The following players received wildcards into the singles main draw:

- (Italy) Raúl Brancaccio
- (Italy) Enrico Dalla Valle
- (Italy) Francesco Maestrelli

The following player received entry into the singles main draw using a protected ranking:

- (Serbia) Filip Krajinović

The following player received entry into the singles main draw as a special exempt:

- (Georgia (country)) Nikoloz Basilashvili

The following player received entry into the singles main draw as an alternate:

- (Italy) Francesco Passaro

The following players received entry from the qualifying draw:

- (France) Mathias Bourgue
- (France) Evan Furness
- (France) Arthur Géa
- (Belgium) Michael Geerts
- (France) Manuel Guinard
- (Italy) Samuel Vincent Ruggeri

The following player received entry as a lucky loser:

- (Sweden) Elias Ymer
