= 2026 Napoli Tennis Cup =

- Date: 23–29 March
- Edition: 24th
- Surface: Clay / outdoor
- Location: Naples, Italy
- Venue: Tennis Club Napoli

Champions

Singles
- (Serbia) Hamad Medjedovic

Doubles
- (Switzerland) Jakub Paul / (Czech Republic) Matěj Vocel
- Napoli Tennis Cup

The 2026 Guerri Napoli Tennis Cup was a professional men's tennis tournament played on outdoor clay courts. It was the 24th edition of the tournament, and part of the 2026 ATP Challenger Tour. It took place at the Tennis Club Napoli in Naples, Italy from 23 to 29 March 2026.

== Champions ==
=== Singles ===
- (Serbia) Hamad Medjedovic def. (Germany) Daniel Altmaier 6–2, 6–4.

=== Doubles ===
- (Switzerland) Jakub Paul / (Czech Republic) Matěj Vocel def. (Germany) Tim Rühl / (Netherlands) Mick Veldheer 6–2, 6–4.

== Singles main-draw entrants ==
=== Seeds ===
Country	Player	Rank^{1}	Seed
GER	Daniel Altmaier	55	1
CZE	Vít Kopřiva	60	2
FRA	Alexandre Müller	90	3
SUI	Stan Wawrinka	94	4
SRB	Hamad Medjedovic	115	5
ITA	Andrea Pellegrino	128	6
FRA	Kyrian Jacquet	146	7
FRA	Ugo Blanchet	154	8

- Rankings are as of 16 March 2026.

=== Other entrants ===
The following players received wildcards into the singles main draw:

- (Germany) Daniel Altmaier
- (Italy) Carlo Alberto Caniato
- (Italy) Jacopo Vasamì

The following player received entry into the singles main draw as an alternate:

- (Italy) Gabriele Piraino

The following players received entry from the qualifying draw:

- (Czech Republic) Hynek Bartoň
- (Italy) Federico Bondioli
- (Italy) Enrico Dalla Valle
- (Italy) Francesco Forti
- (Switzerland) Jakub Paul
- (Italy) Michele Ribecai

The following players received entry as lucky losers:

- (Italy) Andrea Guerrieri
- (Spain) David Jordà Sanchis
