= Napoli Tennis Cup =

Tennis tournament in Naples, Italy

- 2026 Napoli Tennis Cup

ATP Challenger Tour
- Event name: Guerri Napoli Tennis Cup (2026-present)
- Location: Naples, Italy
- Venue: Tennis Club Napoli
- Category: ATP Challenger Tour 125, ATP 250 (2022)
- Surface: Clay
- Draw: 32S/27Q/16D
- Prize money: €181,250 (2025) €148,625+H (2024)
- Website: Website

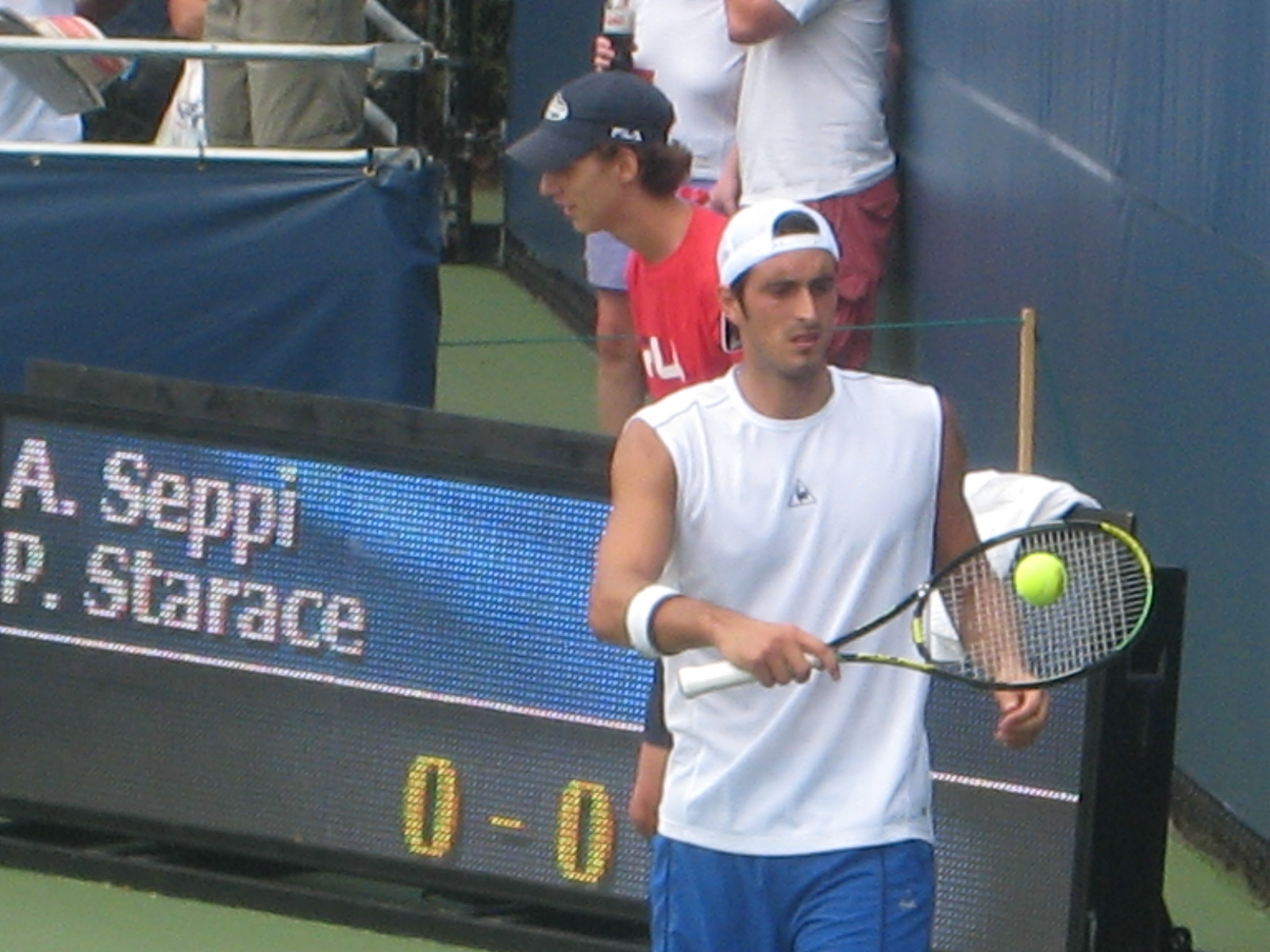
Italy's Potito Starace finished runner-up in 2005, before collecting three straight singles titles from 2006 to 2008.

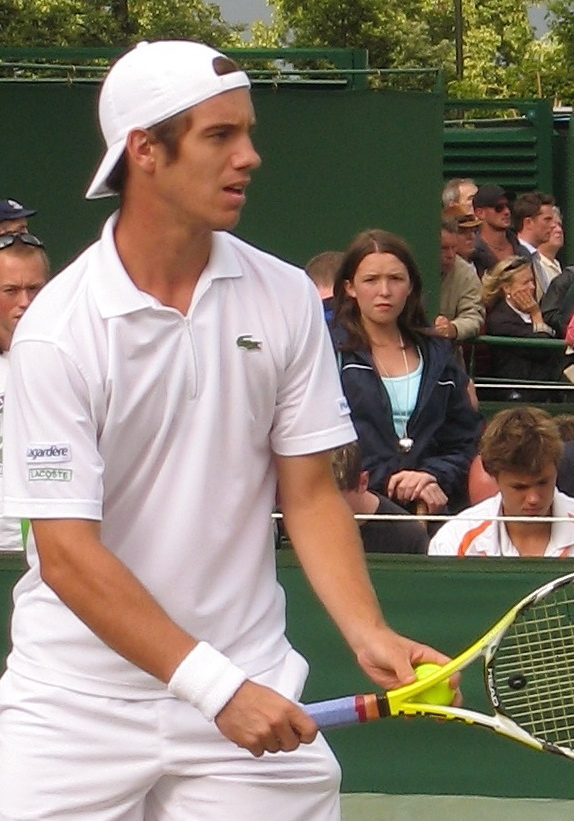
Frenchman Richard Gasquet won the singles twice in 2003 and 2005.

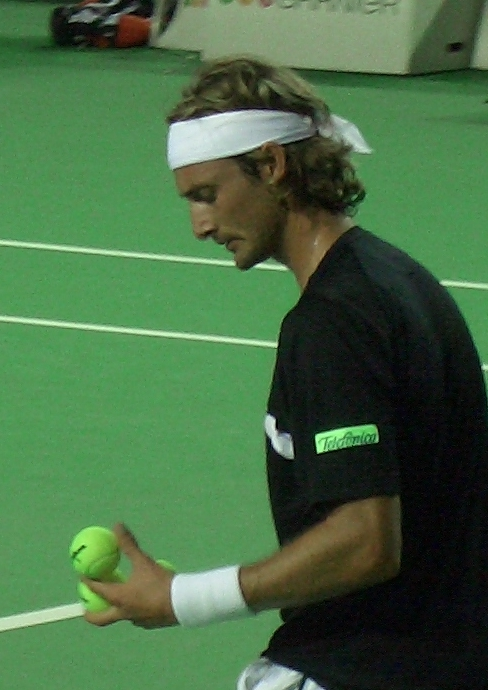
Eventual World No. 1 Juan Carlos Ferrero from Spain won in singles in 1999.

The Guerri Napoli Tennis Cup (formerly the Tennis Napoli Cup and Capri Watch Cup) is a professional tennis tournament played on outdoor clay courts. It is currently part of the ATP Challenger Tour. It is held annually at the Tennis Club Napoli in Naples, Italy, since 1995. The event was given a single-year ATP 250 license in 2022 due to the cancellation of tournaments in China because of the ongoing COVID-19 pandemic.

== History ==
The tournament is the modern iteration of one of the oldest tennis championships in Italy, the Campionato Partenopeo (Parthenopean Championship), which for men's singles was first contested in 1905. Over the years the men's tournament has been combined with other trophies, such as Coppa Gordon Bennet (1907–1910 and 1937), Coppa Reale (1912–1915), Coppa del Municipio di Napoli (1926–1938), Campionato dell’Europa Centrale (1937–1938), Coppa Città di Napoli (1953–1970), Coppa Carlo D'Avalos (1970).

At the time of the amateur tennis the Naples tournament gained increasing importance over the years, becoming one of the pivotal events of the spring season of the courts of Europe and a decisive step in preparation for the Internationals of Italy and those of France. Following the affirmation of professionalism, the tournament lost its relevance and disappeared, rising from the mid-1990s and finding a place within the category of ATP Challenger.

The women's tournament (singles and doubles), played simultaneously with the men's tournament until 1970, now no longer takes place.

== Venue ==
From the beginning, the tournament is played on the courts of the Circolo del Tennis di Napoli, which occupies an area near the ancient Villa Reale di Chiaia, a few meters from the Gulf of Naples and minutes from downtown and historic centre.

== Past finals ==
=== Singles ===
Year	Champion	Runner-up	Score
2026	(Serbia) Hamad Medjedovic	(Germany) Daniel Altmaier	6–2, 6–4
2025	(Czech Republic) Vít Kopřiva	(Italy) Luciano Darderi	3–6, 6–3, 7–6^{(7–4)}
2024	(Italy) Luca Nardi	(France) Pierre-Hugues Herbert	5–7, 7–6^{(7–3)}, 6–2
2023	Not held		
2022	(Italy) Lorenzo Musetti	(Italy) Matteo Berrettini	7–6^{(7–5)}, 6–2
2021	(Netherlands) Tallon Griekspoor	(Italy) Andrea Pellegrino	6–3, 6–2
2017–2020	Not held		
2016	(Slovakia) Jozef Kovalík	(Belgium) Arthur De Greef	6–3, 6–2
2015	(Spain) Daniel Muñoz de la Nava	(Italy) Matteo Donati	6–2, 6–1
2014	Not held		
2013	(Italy) Potito Starace	(Italy) Alessandro Giannessi	6–2, 2–0 ret.
2012	(Russia) Andrey Kuznetsov	(France) Jonathan Dasnières de Veigy	7–6^{(8–6)}, 7–6^{(8–6)}
2011	(Netherlands) Thomas Schoorel	(Italy) Filippo Volandri	6–2, 7–6^{(7–4)}
2010	(Portugal) Rui Machado	(Argentina) Federico Delbonis	6–4, 6–4
2009	(Uruguay) Pablo Cuevas	(Romania) Victor Crivoi	6–1, 6–3
2008	(Italy) Potito Starace	(Brazil) Marcos Daniel	6–4, 4–6, 7–6^{(7–3)}
2007	(Italy) Potito Starace	(Morocco) Younes El Aynaoui	7–5, 6–2
2006	(Italy) Potito Starace	(Italy) Alessio di Mauro	6–0, 5–1 retired
2005	(France) Richard Gasquet	(Italy) Potito Starace	4–6, 6–3, 7–5
2004	(Luxembourg) Gilles Müller	(France) Arnaud Di Pasquale	7–6^{(9–7)}, 6–7^{(1–7)}, 6–1
2003	(France) Richard Gasquet	(Luxembourg) Gilles Müller	6–4, 6–4
2002	(Spain) David Ferrer	(Monaco) Jean-René Lisnard	6–1, 6–1
2001	Not held		
2000	Not held		
1999	(Spain) Juan Carlos Ferrero	(Spain) Juan Albert Viloca	3–6, 7–6, 6–1
1998	(Italy) Davide Sanguinetti	(Russia) Marat Safin	6–4, 6–4
1997	(Romania) Dinu Pescariu	(Germany) Oliver Gross	6–4, 6–2
1996	(Spain) Félix Mantilla	(Morocco) Karim Alami	6–3, 7–5
1995	(Sweden) Thomas Johansson	(France) Frédéric Vitoux	6–0, 6–0
1982–1994	Not held		
1981	(West Germany) Damir Keretić	(Argentina) Gustavo Guerrero	4–6, 6–2, 6–2
1980	(France) Christophe Roger-Vasselin		
1979	(Uruguay) José Luis Damiani		
1978	(Australia) Peter McNamara		
1976–1977	Not held		
1975	(Italy) Ezio Di Matteo		
1971–1974	Not held		
1970	(Romania) Ilie Năstase	(Italy) Martin Mulligan	6–1, 4–6, 6–4, 6–3
1969	(Chile) Patricio Rodríguez	(Italy) Martin Mulligan	8–6, 6–3, 0–6, 6–3
1968	(Australia) Martin Mulligan	(Italy) Nicola Pietrangeli	6–1, 6–2, 6–2
1967	(Australia) Martin Mulligan	(Italy) Nicola Pietrangeli	5–7, 4–6, 6–0, 6–1, 6–0
1966	(Italy) Nicola Pietrangeli	(Australia) Tony Roche	8–6, 2–6, 6–2, 6–1
1965	(Australia) Martin Mulligan	(Italy) Nicola Pietrangeli	6–4, 6–3, 6–3
1964	(Italy) Nicola Pietrangeli	(Brazil) José Edison Mandarino	2–6, 6–4, 6–1, 6–3
1963	(Sweden) Jan-Erik Lundqvist	(Australia) Fred Stolle	6–3, 0–6, 3–6, 6–3, 6–1
1962	(Italy) Fausto Gardini	(Italy) Sergio Tacchini	4–6, 6–2, 6–1, 6–1
1961	(Italy) Nicola Pietrangeli	(Sweden) Jan-Erik Lundqvist	6–1, 6–1, 6–2
1960	Not held		
1959	(Italy) Nicola Pietrangeli		
1958	(Australia) Mervyn Rose		
1957	(Italy) Orlando Sirola		
1956	(Australia) Lewis Hoad		
1955	(Italy) Giuseppe Merlo		
1954	Not held		
1953	(United States) Budge Patty		
1939–1952	Not held		
1938	(Switzerland) Boris Maneff		
1937	(Italy) Giovanni Palmieri		
1936	(Italy) Giovanni Palmieri		
1935	(Italy) Giovanni Palmieri		
1934	(Czech Republic) Roderich Menzel		
1933	(Italy) Giorgio de Stefani		
1932	(Italy) Giorgio de Stefani		
1931	(Republic of Ireland) George Lyttleton-Rogers		
1930	(Italy) Clemente Serventi		
1929	(Italy) Carlo d'Avalos		
1928	(France) Antoine Gentien		
1927	(Italy) Carlo d'Avalos		
1926	(Italy) Carlo d'Avalos		
1925	(Italy) Carlo d'Avalos		
1924	(Italy) Carlo d'Avalos		
1923	(Italy) Riccardo Sabbadini		
1922	(United Kingdom) George Grounsell		
1921	(Italy) Riccardo Sabbadini		
1920	(Italy) Riccardo Sabbadini		
1919	(United Kingdom) George Grounsell	Autumn edition	
1919	(Italy) Eugenio Schioppa	Spring edition	
1916–1918	Not held due to World War I		
1915	(Italy) Eugenio Schioppa		
1914	(Italy) Mino Balbi Di Robecco		
1913	(Italy) Eugenio Schioppa	Autumn edition	
1913	(Italy) Eugenio Schioppa	Spring edition	
1912	(Italy) Tullio Jappelli	Autumn edition	
1912	(Italy) Tullio Jappelli	Spring edition	
1911	Title not awarded		
1910	(Italy) Eugenio Schioppa	Autumn edition	
1910	(German Empire) Alfredo Pflucker	Spring edition	
1909	(German Empire) Alfredo Pflucker	Autumn edition	
1909	(German Empire) Alfredo Pflucker	Spring edition	
1908	(German Empire) Alfredo Pflucker	Autumn edition	
1908	(United Kingdom) Robert Hotham	Spring edition	
1907	(German Empire) Alfredo Pflucker	Autumn edition	
1907	(German Empire) Alfredo Pflucker	Spring edition	
1906	(German Empire) Alfredo Pflucker		
1905	(United Kingdom) Geoffrey Smith		

=== Doubles ===
Year	Champions	Runners-up	Score
2026	(Switzerland) Jakub Paul (Czech Republic) Matěj Vocel	(Germany) Tim Rühl (Netherlands) Mick Veldheer	6–2, 6–4
2025	(Austria) Alexander Erler (Germany) Constantin Frantzen	(France) Geoffrey Blancaneaux (France) Albano Olivetti	6–4, 6–4
2024	(Argentina) Guido Andreozzi (Mexico) Miguel Ángel Reyes-Varela	(France) Théo Arribagé (Romania) Victor Vlad Cornea	6–4, 1–6, [10–7]
2023	Not held		
2022	(Croatia) Ivan Dodig (United States) Austin Krajicek	(Australia) Matthew Ebden (Australia) John Peers	6–3, 1–6, [10–8]
2021	(Germany) Dustin Brown (Italy) Andrea Vavassori	(Bosnia and Herzegovina) Mirza Bašić (Croatia) Nino Serdarušić	7–5, 7–6^{(7–5)}
2017– 2020	Not held		
2016	(Germany) Gero Kretschmer (Germany) Alexander Satschko	(Italy) Matteo Donati (Italy) Stefano Napolitano	6–1, 6–3
2015	(Serbia) Ilija Bozoljac (Serbia) Filip Krajinović	(Georgia (country)) Nikoloz Basilashvili (Belarus) Aliaksandr Bury	6–1, 6–2
2014	Not held		
2013	(Italy) Stefano Ianni (Italy) Potito Starace	(Italy) Alessandro Giannessi (Kazakhstan) Andrey Golubev	6–1, 6–3
2012	(Lithuania) Laurynas Grigelis (Italy) Alessandro Motti	(Australia) Rameez Junaid (Slovakia) Igor Zelenay	6–4, 6–4
2011	(United States) Travis Rettenmaier (Germany) Simon Stadler	(United States) Travis Parrott (Sweden) Andreas Siljeström	6–4, 6–4
2010	(Jamaica) Dustin Brown (United States) Jesse Witten	(India) Rohan Bopanna (Pakistan) Aisam-ul-Haq Qureshi	7–6^{(7–4)}, 7–5
2009	(Uruguay) Pablo Cuevas (Spain) David Marrero	(Czech Republic) Lukáš Rosol (Germany) Frank Moser	6–4, 6–3
2008	(Czech Republic) Tomáš Cibulec (Czech Republic) Jaroslav Levinský	(Portugal) Frederico Gil (Peru) Luis Horna	6–1, 6–3
2007	(Italy) Flavio Cipolla (Spain) Marcel Granollers	(Italy) Marco Crugnola (Italy) Alessio di Mauro	6–4, 6–2
2006	(Czech Republic) Tomáš Cibulec (Poland) Łukasz Kubot	(Italy) Simone Bolelli (Italy) Fabio Fognini	7–5, 4–6, 10–7
2005	(Serbia and Montenegro) Janko Tipsarević (Czech Republic) Jiří Vaněk	(Italy) Massimo Bertolini (Italy) Uros Vico	3–6, 6–4, 6–2
2004	(Germany) Tomas Behrend (Italy) Giorgio Galimberti	(Czech Republic) Michal Tabara (Czech Republic) Jiří Vaněk	6–1, 6–3
2003	(Italy) Massimo Bertolini (Italy) Giorgio Galimberti	(Israel) Amir Hadad (Belgium) Christophe Rochus	2–6, 7–5, 6–4
2002	(Romania) Gabriel Trifu (Belarus) Vladimir Voltchkov	(Argentina) Leonardo Olguín (Argentina) Martín Vassallo Argüello	7–5, 7–6^{(7–5)}
2001	Not held		
2000	Not held		
1999	(South Africa) Marcos Ondruska (United States) Jack Waite	(Italy) Massimo Bertolini (Italy) Cristian Brandi	6–4, 7–6
1998	(Italy) Massimo Bertolini (United States) Devin Bowen	(Egypt) Tamer El Sawy (Hungary) Gábor Köves	7–6, 6–2
1997	(North Macedonia) Aleksandar Kitinov (Belgium) Tom Vanhoudt	(Spain) Tomás Carbonell (Spain) Francisco Roig	7–6, 6–4
1996	(Italy) Omar Camporese (Italy) Diego Nargiso	(Latvia) Ģirts Dzelde (Sweden) Tomas Nydahl	3–6, 6–4, 7–6
1995	(Italy) Stefano Pescosolido (Italy) Vincenzo Santopadre	(United States) Kent Kinnear (United States) Jack Waite	6–1, 3–6, 6–3
