= 2012 BRD Timișoara Challenger – Doubles =

Doubles
- 2012 BRD Timișoara Challenger

Final
- Champions: (Montenegro) Goran Tošić (United States) Denis Zivkovic
- Runners-up: (Romania) Andrei Dăescu (Romania) Florin Mergea
- Score: 6–2, 7–5

Events
Singles	Doubles
← 2011 ·	BRD Timișoara Challenger	· 2013 →

Daniel Muñoz-de la Nava and Rubén Ramírez Hidalgo were the defending champions but decided not to participate.
Goran Tošić and Denis Zivkovic won the final against Andrei Dăescu and Florin Mergea 6–2, 7–5.

== Seeds ==
1. (Romania) Andrei Dăescu / (Romania) Florin Mergea (final)
2. (Montenegro) Goran Tošić / (United States) Denis Zivkovic (champions)
3. (Brazil) Guilherme Clezar / (Brazil) André Ghem (semifinals)
4. (Argentina) Facundo Bagnis / (Argentina) Pablo Galdón (semifinals)

== Draw ==
=== Key ===
- Q = Qualifier
- WC = Wild card
- LL = Lucky loser
- Alt = Alternate
- ITF = ITF entry
- PR = Protected ranking
- SR = Special ranking
- SE = Special exempt
- JE = Junior exempt
- JR = Junior Accelerator Programme entrant
- CO = College Accelerator Programme entrant
- NG = Next Gen Accelerator Program entrant
- w/o = Walkover
- r = Retired
- d = Defaulted

=== Draw ===
First round
(Czech Republic) Michal Konečný (Czech Republic) M Michalička	7	3	[10]
(France) A Michon (France) G Rufin	5	6	[8]
4	(Argentina) F Bagnis (Argentina) P Galdón	6	6
(Greece) A Jakupovic (Romania) Dragoș Mîrtea	4	4
(Romania) Alex Pipoși (Romania) R Sabău	1	6	[10]
(Greece) Niko Karagiannis (United Kingdom) James Marsalek	6	2	[3]
(Czech Republic) D Lojda (Czech Republic) Radomil Lojda	6	6
(Romania) Bogdan Ciocov (Romania) Fabian Pătruțescu	1	4
(Romania) Sebastian Kraila (Romania) G Moraru	6^{5}	2
3	(Brazil) G Clezar (Brazil) A Ghem	7^{7}	6
(Spain) Ó Burrieza (Spain) J Martí	6	0	[6]
(Croatia) D Marcan (Croatia) N Mektić	4	6	[10]
(Serbia) I Bozoljac (Romania) M Copil	6	3	[6]
2	(Montenegro) G Tošić (United States) D Zivkovic	3	6	[10]

Quarterfinals
1	(Romania) A Dăescu (Romania) F Mergea	7^{7}	6
(Czech Republic) Michal Konečný (Czech Republic) M Michalička	6^{5}	3
4	(Argentina) F Bagnis (Argentina) P Galdón	6	6
(Romania) Alex Pipoși (Romania) R Sabău	4	2
(Czech Republic) D Lojda (Czech Republic) Radomil Lojda
3	(Brazil) G Clezar (Brazil) A Ghem	w/o
(Croatia) D Marcan (Croatia) N Mektić	6	3	[7]
2	(Montenegro) G Tošić (United States) D Zivkovic	3	6	[10]

Semifinals
1	(Romania) A Dăescu (Romania) F Mergea	7^{7}	6
4	(Argentina) F Bagnis (Argentina) P Galdón	6^{2}	2
3	(Brazil) G Clezar (Brazil) A Ghem	3	3
2	(Montenegro) G Tošić (United States) D Zivkovic	6	6

Final
1	(Romania) A Dăescu (Romania) F Mergea	2	5
2	(Montenegro) G Tošić (United States) D Zivkovic	6	7
