= 2012 Rai Open – Doubles =

Doubles
- 2012 Rai Open

Final
- Champion: (Germany) Dustin Brown (United Kingdom) Jonathan Marray
- Runner-up: (Romania) Andrei Dăescu (Romania) Florin Mergea
- Score: 6–4, 7–6^{(7–0)}

Events
Singles	Doubles
← 2011 ·	Rai Open	· 2013 →

Martin Kližan and Alessandro Motti were the defending champions but Kližan decided not to participate.
Motti played alongside Laurynas Grigelis.
Dustin Brown and Jonathan Marray won the final 6–4, 7–6^{(7–0)} against Andrei Dăescu and Florin Mergea.

== Seeds ==
1. (Germany) Dustin Brown / (United Kingdom) Jonathan Marray (champions)
2. (Poland) Tomasz Bednarek / (France) Olivier Charroin (quarterfinals)
3. (Australia) Rameez Junaid / (Slovakia) Igor Zelenay (semifinals)
4. (Lithuania) Laurynas Grigelis / (Italy) Alessandro Motti (first round)

== Draw ==
=== Key ===
- Q = Qualifier
- WC = Wild card
- LL = Lucky loser
- Alt = Alternate
- SE = Special exempt
- PR = Protected ranking
- ITF = ITF entry
- JE = Junior exempt
- w/o = Walkover
- r = Retired
- d = Defaulted
- SR = Special ranking

=== Draw ===
First round
1	(Germany) D Brown (United Kingdom) J Marray	6	6
(Netherlands) T Schoorel (Netherlands) I Sijsling	3	4
(Netherlands) J Huta Galung (Turkey) M İlhan	2	4
(Belgium) M Authom (France) M Teixeira	6	6
3	(Australia) R Junaid (Slovakia) I Zelenay	6	3	[10]
WC	(Belarus) A Bury (Croatia) Ante Pavić	2	6	[7]
(Czech Republic) D Lojda (Czech Republic) D Škoch	6	6
WC	(Italy) Marco Cecchinato (Italy) G Naso	1	3
(Spain) G Granollers (Spain) G Olaso	w/o
(Portugal) R Machado (Portugal) P Sousa
(Austria) M Fischer (Serbia) D Lajović	6	6^{5}	[10]
4	(Lithuania) L Grigelis (Italy) A Motti	2	7^{7}	[7]
WC	(Italy) T Fabbiano (Italy) Matteo Fago	2	1
(Romania) A Dăescu (Romania) F Mergea	6	6
(Serbia) F Krajinović (Croatia) N Mektić	3	2
2	(Poland) T Bednarek (France) O Charroin	6	6

Quarterfinals
1	(Germany) D Brown (United Kingdom) J Marray	4	6	[10]
(Belgium) M Authom (France) M Teixeira	6	3	[6]
3	(Australia) R Junaid (Slovakia) I Zelenay	2	6	[10]
(Czech Republic) D Lojda (Czech Republic) D Škoch	6	4	[5]
(Spain) G Granollers (Spain) G Olaso	2	1
(Austria) M Fischer (Serbia) D Lajović	6	6
(Romania) A Dăescu (Romania) F Mergea	6	2	[10]
2	(Poland) T Bednarek (France) O Charroin	4	6	[7]

Semifinals
1	(Germany) D Brown (United Kingdom) J Marray	7	7
3	(Australia) R Junaid (Slovakia) I Zelenay	5	5
(Austria) M Fischer (Serbia) D Lajović	6	6^{7}	[2]
(Romania) A Dăescu (Romania) F Mergea	3	7^{9}	[10]

Final
1	(Germany) D Brown (United Kingdom) J Marray	6	7^{7}
(Romania) A Dăescu (Romania) F Mergea	4	6^{0}
