= 2011 Rai Open – Singles =

Singles
- 2011 Rai Open

Final
- Champion: (Netherlands) Thomas Schoorel
- Runner-up: (Slovakia) Martin Kližan
- Score: 7–5, 1–6, 6–3

Events
Singles	Doubles
← 2010 ·	Rai Open	· 2012 →

Filippo Volandri was the defending champion but decided not to participate.
Thomas Schoorel won the title, defeating Martin Kližan 7–5, 1–6, 6–3 in the final.

== Seeds ==
1. (Austria) Andreas Haider-Maurer (quarterfinals)
2. (Germany) Björn Phau (first round)
3. (Turkey) Marsel İlhan (quarterfinals)
4. (Germany) Andreas Beck (semifinals)
5. (Germany) Julian Reister (quarterfinals, withdrew due to left foot injury)
6. (Czech Republic) Ivo Minář (semifinals)
7. (Germany) Simon Greul (first round)
8. (Austria) ~~Martin Fischer~~ (withdrew)

== Draw ==
=== Key ===
- Q = Qualifier
- WC = Wild card
- LL = Lucky loser
- Alt = Alternate
- SE = Special exempt
- PR = Protected ranking
- ITF = ITF entry
- JE = Junior exempt
- w/o = Walkover
- r = Retired
- d = Defaulted
- SR = Special ranking

=== Finals ===
Semifinals
(Slovakia) Martin Kližan	3	6	6
6	(Czech Republic) Ivo Minář	6	4	2
4	(Germany) Andreas Beck	6^{6}	7	2
(Netherlands) Thomas Schoorel	7	6^{5}	6

Final
(Slovakia) Martin Kližan	5	6	3
(Netherlands) Thomas Schoorel	7	1	6

=== Top half ===
First round
1	(Austria) A Haider-Maurer	6	2	6
(Belarus) U Ignatik	3	6	4
(Slovakia) I Klec	7	4	6
(Spain) D Muñoz-De La Nava	6^{3}	6	3
(Germany) B Knittel	3	2
(France) A Gensse	6	6
(Slovakia) M Kližan	4	6	6
7	(Germany) S Greul	6	2	0
3	(Turkey) M İlhan	6	7
(Canada) P Polansky	3	5
(Spain) I Navarro	4	4
(Spain) G Olaso	6	6
WC	(Italy) A Giannessi	2	6^{3}
(Romania) A Ungur	6	7
WC	(Italy) G Naso	2	3
6	(Czech Republic) I Minář	6	6

Second round
1	(Austria) A Haider-Maurer	7	6
(Slovakia) I Klec	5	3
(France) A Gensse	6	3	3
(Slovakia) M Kližan	3	6	6
3	(Turkey) M İlhan	2	6	6
(Spain) G Olaso	6	1	3
(Romania) A Ungur	3	2
6	(Czech Republic) I Minář	6	6

Quarterfinals
1	(Austria) A Haider-Maurer	2	6^{5}
(Slovakia) M Kližan	6	7
3	(Turkey) M İlhan	3	4
6	(Czech Republic) I Minář	6	6

Semifinals
(Slovakia) M Kližan	3	6	6
6	(Czech Republic) I Minář	6	4	2

=== Bottom half ===
First round
5	(Germany) J Reister	6	7
(Romania) V Crivoi	3	6^{5}
(Belgium) S Darcis	6^{2}	2
Q	(Slovakia) P Červenák	7	6
WC	(Italy) T Fabbiano	6	7
(Serbia) N Ćirić	3	6^{4}
(Croatia) A Veić	6	4	4
4	(Germany) A Beck	3	6	6
LL	(Croatia) N Mektić	4	6^{6}
(Russia) E Donskoy	6	7
WC	(Austria) T Muster	0	3
Q	(Germany) C-M Stebe	6	6
Q	(Spain) P Carreño-Busta	6	3	6^{6}
(Netherlands) T Schoorel	3	6	7
Q	(Serbia) B Pašanski	6	6
2	(Germany) B Phau	4	4

Second round
5	(Germany) J Reister	6	6
Q	(Slovakia) P Červenák	3	4
WC	(Italy) T Fabbiano	2	1
4	(Germany) A Beck	6	6
(Russia) E Donskoy	6^{7}	4
Q	(Germany) C-M Stebe	7	6
(Netherlands) T Schoorel	3	5
Q	(Serbia) B Pašanski	6	4^{r}

Quarterfinals
5	(Germany) J Reister
4	(Germany) A Beck	w/o
Q	(Germany) C-M Stebe	6	6^{4}	4
(Netherlands) T Schoorel	2	7	6

Semifinals
5	(Germany) A Beck	6^{6}	7	2
(Netherlands) T Schoorel	7	6^{5}	6
