= 2010 Rai Open – Doubles =

Doubles
- 2010 Rai Open

Final
- Champions: (Poland) Tomasz Bednarek (Poland) Mateusz Kowalczyk
- Runners-up: (South Africa) Jeff Coetzee (United States) Jesse Witten
- Score: 6–4, 7–6(4)

Events
Singles	Doubles
← 2009 ·	Rai Open	· 2011 →

Simon Greul and Alessandro Motti were the defending champions, but Greul chose to participate in Monte Carlo instead.
Motti partnered up with Rubén Ramírez Hidalgo, but they lost to Jorge Aguilar and Federico del Bonis in the first round.
Polish pair Tomasz Bednarek and Mateusz Kowalczyk won in the final 6–4, 7–6(4), against Jeff Coetzee and Jesse Witten.

== Seeds ==
1. (Italy) Daniele Bracciali / (Pakistan) Aisam-ul-Haq Qureshi (semifinals)
2. (Italy) Alessandro Motti / (Spain) Rubén Ramírez Hidalgo (first round)
3. (Poland) Tomasz Bednarek / (Poland) Mateusz Kowalczyk (champions)
4. (Canada) Adil Shamasdin / (Russia) Dmitri Sitak (first round)

== Draw ==
Key

- Q = Qualifier
- WC = Wild card
- LL = Lucky loser
- Alt = Alternate
- ITF = ITF entry
- PR = Protected ranking
- SR = Special ranking
- SE = Special exempt
- JE = Junior exempt
- JR = Junior Accelerator Programme entrant
- CO = College Accelerator Programme entrant
- NG = Next Gen Accelerator Program entrant
- w/o = Walkover
- r = Retired
- d = Defaulted

=== Draw ===
First round
1	(Italy) D Bracciali (Pakistan) A-u-H Qureshi	6	6
(Czech Republic) I Minář (Czech Republic) L Rosol	3	4
(Argentina) D Álvarez (Italy) A di Mauro	6	6
(Italy) A Arnaboldi (Italy) G Naso	3	2
3	(Poland) T Bednarek (Poland) M Kowalczyk	6	7
WC	(Italy) F Cipolla (Italy) V Santopadre	3	5
(Spain) D Marrero (Romania) A Ungur	7	7
(Russia) D Matsukevich (Kazakhstan) Y Schukin	6^{3}	5
(South Africa) J Coetzee (United States) J Witten	7	6
WC	(Croatia) F Škugor (Croatia) I Zovko	5	3
WC	(Italy) A Comporto (Italy) M Viola	7	2	[10]
4	(Canada) A Shamasdin (Russia) D Sitak	6^{5}	6	5
(Chile) A García (Spain) A Ramos-Viñolas	4	2
(Netherlands) J Huta Galung (Netherlands) R Wassen	6	6
(Chile) J Aguilar (Argentina) F del Bonis	6	6
2	(Italy) A Motti (Spain) R Ramírez Hidalgo	3	1

Quarterfinals
1	(Italy) D Bracciali (Pakistan) A-u-H Qureshi	6	4	[10]
(Argentina) D Álvarez (Italy) A di Mauro	4	6	[6]
3	(Poland) T Bednarek (Poland) M Kowalczyk	6	7
(Spain) D Marrero (Romania) A Ungur	4	5
(South Africa) J Coetzee (United States) J Witten	6	6
WC	(Italy) A Comporto (Italy) M Viola	1	0
(Netherlands) J Huta Galung (Netherlands) R Wassen	1	3
(Chile) J Aguilar (Argentina) F del Bonis	6	6

Semifinals
1	(Italy) D Bracciali (Pakistan) A-u-H Qureshi	4	6^{5}
3	(Poland) T Bednarek (Poland) M Kowalczyk	6	7
(South Africa) J Coetzee (United States) J Witten	6	6
(Chile) J Aguilar (Argentina) F del Bonis	3	1

Finals
3	(Poland) T Bednarek (Poland) M Kowalczyk	6	7
(South Africa) J Coetzee (United States) J Witten	4	6^{4}
