= 2013 BRD Timișoara Challenger – Singles =

Singles
- 2013 BRD Timișoara Challenger

Final
- Champion: (Austria) Andreas Haider-Maurer
- Runner-up: (Spain) Rubén Ramírez Hidalgo
- Score: 6–4, 3–6, 6–4

Events
Singles	Doubles
← 2012 ·	BRD Timișoara Challenger	· 2014 →

Victor Hănescu was the defending champion but decided not to participate.
Andreas Haider-Maurer defeated Rubén Ramírez Hidalgo 6–4, 3–6, 6–4 in the final to take the title.

== Seeds ==
1. (Romania) Adrian Ungur (quarterfinals)
2. (United States) Wayne Odesnik (second round)
3. (Austria) Andreas Haider-Maurer (champion)
4. (Spain) Rubén Ramírez Hidalgo (final)
5. (Romania) Marius Copil (second round)
6. (Spain) Pablo Carreno Busta (quarterfinals)
7. (Tunisia) Malek Jaziri (first round)
8. (France) David Guez (second round)

== Draw ==
=== Key ===
- Q = Qualifier
- WC = Wild card
- LL = Lucky loser
- Alt = Alternate
- SE = Special exempt
- PR = Protected ranking
- ITF = ITF entry
- JE = Junior exempt
- w/o = Walkover
- r = Retired
- d = Defaulted
- SR = Special ranking

=== Finals ===
Semifinals
(Romania) Victor Crivoi	3	3
3	(Austria) Andreas Haider-Maurer	6	6
4	(Spain) Rubén Ramírez Hidalgo	7	6
Q	(Serbia) Miljan Zekić	5	3

Final
3	(Austria) Andreas Haider-Maurer	6	3	6
4	(Spain) Rubén Ramírez Hidalgo	4	6	4

=== Top half ===
First round
1	(Romania) A Ungur	6	7^{7}
(Moldova) R Albot	4	6^{4}
Alt	(Czech Republic) J Pospíšil	5	4
Q	(Italy) L Giustino	7	6
(Romania) V Crivoi	4	6	6
(Czech Republic) D Lojda	6	4	0
Q	(Austria) M Linzer	6	6
7	(Tunisia) M Jaziri	3	4
3	(Austria) A Haider-Maurer	7	6
(Croatia) N Mektić	5	2
(Chile) J Aguilar	7	2	4
(Serbia) B Pašanski	5	6	6
(Italy) S Vagnozzi	6	4	7
(Spain) J Samper-Montaña	1	6	5
(Austria) G Melzer	6^{4}	7^{7}	6^{3}
5	(Romania) M Copil	7^{7}	6	7^{7}

Second round
1	(Romania) A Ungur	6^{5}	6	6
Q	(Italy) L Giustino	7^{7}	0	2
(Romania) V Crivoi	6	6
Q	(Austria) M Linzer	3	4
3	(Austria) A Haider-Maurer	7	6
(Serbia) B Pašanski	5	4
(Italy) S Vagnozzi	7^{7}	6
5	(Romania) M Copil	6^{5}	3

Quarterfinals
1	(Romania) A Ungur	1	2
(Romania) V Crivoi	6	6
3	(Austria) A Haider-Maurer	6	4
(Italy) S Vagnozzi	3	2^{r}

Semifinals
(Romania) V Crivoi	3	3
3	(Austria) A Haider-Maurer	6	6

=== Bottom half ===
First round
6	(Spain) P Carreño Busta	6	6
WC	(Romania) P-A Luncanu	1	1
(Bosnia and Herzegovina) A Šetkić	6	6^{5}	5
Q	(France) A Michon	2	7^{7}	7
(Switzerland) H Laaksonen	6	6
WC	(Romania) VV Cornea	1	2
(Republic of Ireland) J McGee	2	3
4	(Spain) R Ramírez Hidalgo	6	6
8	(France) D Guez	6	6
WC	(Romania) Dragoș Cristian Mîrtea	3	0
(Slovakia) M Semjan	1	6	0
Q	(Serbia) M Zekić	6	3	6
(France) J Eysseric	6	6
WC	(Romania) P Ciorcilă	3	4
(France) N Renavand	6^{7}	3
2	(United States) W Odesnik	7^{9}	6

Second round
6	(Spain) P Carreño Busta	6	7
Q	(France) A Michon	2	5
(Switzerland) H Laaksonen	1	6	5
4	(Spain) R Ramírez Hidalgo	6	3	7
8	(France) D Guez	7	5	0
Q	(Serbia) M Zekić	5	7	6
(France) J Eysseric	6	6
2	(United States) W Odesnik	4	3

Quarterfinals
6	(Spain) P Carreño Busta	4	4
4	(Spain) R Ramírez Hidalgo	6	6
Q	(Serbia) M Zekić	6^{3}	6	6
(France) J Eysseric	7^{7}	3	3

Semifinals
4	(Spain) R Ramírez Hidalgo	7	6
Q	(Serbia) M Zekić	5	3
