= 2011 Rai Open – Doubles =

Doubles
- 2011 Rai Open

Final
- Champions: (Slovakia) Martin Kližan (Italy) Alessandro Motti
- Runners-up: (Italy) Thomas Fabbiano (Italy) Walter Trusendi
- Score: 7–6(3), 6–4

Events
Singles	Doubles
← 2010 ·	Rai Open	· 2012 →

Tomasz Bednarek and Mateusz Kowalczyk were the defending champions; however, Kowalczyk decided not to participate.
As a result, Bednarek partnered up with Andreas Siljeström. They were eliminated by Leoš Friedl and Ivo Minář in the quarterfinals.
Martin Kližan and Alessandro Motti won the title, defeating Thomas Fabbiano and Walter Trusendi 7–6(3), 6–4 in the final.

== Seeds ==
1. (Sweden) Johan Brunström / (Denmark) Frederik Nielsen (quarterfinals)
2. (Germany) Andreas Beck / (Germany) Christopher Kas (quarterfinals)
3. (Poland) Tomasz Bednarek / (Sweden) Andreas Siljeström (quarterfinals)
4. (France) Olivier Charroin / (Australia) Sadik Kadir (quarterfinals)

== Draw ==
=== Key ===
- Q = Qualifier
- WC = Wild card
- LL = Lucky loser
- Alt = Alternate
- SE = Special exempt
- PR = Protected ranking
- ITF = ITF entry
- JE = Junior exempt
- w/o = Walkover
- r = Retired
- d = Defaulted
- SR = Special ranking

=== Draw ===
First round
1	(Sweden) J Brunström (Denmark) F Nielsen	6	6
(Belarus) U Ignatik (Canada) P Polansky	3	3
(Slovakia) M Kližan (Italy) A Motti	6	6
WC	(Italy) Enrico Fioravante (Slovakia) I Klec	3	2
4	(France) O Charroin (Australia) S Kadir	6	6
WC	(Italy) A Giannessi (Italy) Gianluigi Quinzi	3	4
Alt	(Serbia) B Pašanski (Montenegro) G Tošić	1	5
(Spain) G Olaso (Chile) H Podlipnik	6	7
(Czech Republic) L Friedl (Czech Republic) I Minář	6	7
(Austria) A Haider-Maurer (Germany) B Knittel	3	5
(Spain) D Muñoz-De La Nava (Romania) A Ungur	4	6	[13]
3	(Poland) T Bednarek (Sweden) A Siljeström	6	1	[15]
(Russia) E Donskoy (Spain) I Navarro	3	0
WC	(Italy) T Fabbiano (Italy) W Trusendi	6	6
(Serbia) N Ćirić (Netherlands) T Schoorel	1	3
2	(Germany) A Beck (Germany) C Kas	6	6

Quarterfinals
1	(Sweden) J Brunström (Denmark) F Nielsen	6	4	[2]
(Slovakia) M Kližan (Italy) A Motti	2	6	[10]
4	(France) O Charroin (Australia) S Kadir	3	3
(Spain) G Olaso (Chile) H Podlipnik	6	6
(Czech Republic) L Friedl (Czech Republic) I Minář	6	2	[14]
3	(Poland) T Bednarek (Sweden) A Siljeström	4	6	[12]
WC	(Italy) T Fabbiano (Italy) W Trusendi	1	7	[14]
2	(Germany) A Beck (Germany) C Kas	6	6^{5}	[12]

Semifinals
(Slovakia) M Kližan (Italy) A Motti	6	6
(Spain) G Olaso (Chile) H Podlipnik	2	2
(Czech Republic) L Friedl (Czech Republic) I Minář	6^{4}	6	[7]
WC	(Italy) T Fabbiano (Italy) W Trusendi	7	3	[10]

Final
(Slovakia) M Kližan (Italy) A Motti	7	6
WC	(Italy) T Fabbiano (Italy) W Trusendi	6^{3}	4
