= 2012 BRD Timișoara Challenger – Singles =

Singles
- 2012 BRD Timișoara Challenger

Final
- Champion: (Romania) Victor Hănescu
- Runner-up: (France) Guillaume Rufin
- Score: 6–0, 6–3

Events
Singles	Doubles
- BRD Timișoara Challenger

Daniel Brands was the champion in 2008.
Victor Hănescu won the title, defeating Guillaume Rufin 6–0, 6–3 in the final.

== Seeds ==
1. (Romania) Victor Hănescu (champion)
2. (Portugal) Gastão Elias (first round)
3. (France) Guillaume Rufin (final)
4. (Czech Republic) Dušan Lojda (first round)
5. (France) Grégoire Burquier (quarterfinals)
6. (Spain) Javier Martí (second round)
7. (Argentina) Facundo Bagnis (quarterfinals)
8. (Slovakia) Kamil Čapkovič (first round)

== Draw ==
Key

- Q = Qualifier
- WC = Wild card
- LL = Lucky loser
- Alt = Alternate
- ITF = ITF entry
- PR = Protected ranking
- SR = Special ranking
- SE = Special exempt
- JE = Junior exempt
- JR = Junior Accelerator Programme entrant
- CO = College Accelerator Programme entrant
- NG = Next Gen Accelerator Program entrant
- w/o = Walkover
- r = Retired
- d = Defaulted

=== Finals ===
Semifinals
1	(Romania) Victor Hănescu	7^{7}	6
(Romania) Marius Copil	6^{5}	3
3	(France) Guillaume Rufin	6	7
(Croatia) Nikola Mektić	3	5

Final
1	(Romania) Victor Hănescu	6	6
3	(France) Guillaume Rufin	0	3

=== Top half ===
First round
1	(Romania) V Hănescu	6	6
Q	(Montenegro) G Tošić	0	1
(Argentina) P Galdón	6	2
(Serbia) I Bozoljac	4	0^{r}
(France) A Michon	4	4
(Romania) V Crivoi	6	6
WC	(Romania) F Mergea	2	3
6	(Spain) J Martí	6	6
4	(Czech Republic) D Lojda	7^{7}	4	4
(Romania) M Copil	6^{4}	6	6
Q	(United Kingdom) James Marsalek	5	3
(Czech Republic) Michal Konečný	7	6
Alt	(United States) D Zivkovic	6^{3}	6	4
(Brazil) G Clezar	7^{7}	1	6
(Italy) D Giorgini	1	1
5	(France) G Burquier	6	6

Second round
1	(Romania) V Hănescu	6^{6}	7^{7}	6
(Argentina) P Galdón	7^{8}	6^{3}	2
(Romania) V Crivoi	0	6	6
6	(Spain) J Martí	6	3	2
(Romania) M Copil	6	6
(Czech Republic) Michal Konečný	3	2
(Brazil) G Clezar	3	6	3
5	(France) G Burquier	6	3	6

Quarterfinals
1	(Romania) V Hănescu	6	6
(Romania) V Crivoi	2	4
(Romania) M Copil	6	6
5	(France) G Burquier	3	3

Semifinals
1	(Romania) V Hănescu	7^{7}	6
(Romania) M Copil	6^{5}	3

=== Bottom half ===
First round
7	(Argentina) F Bagnis	7^{8}	6
(Czech Republic) M Michalička	6^{6}	4
(Austria) G Melzer	6	6
Q	(Greece) A Jakupovic	4	4
(Austria) M Linzer	6	6
Q	(Romania) R Sabău	1	4
(Serbia) B Pašanski	3	2
3	(France) G Rufin	6	6
8	(Slovakia) K Čapkovič	3	2
(Spain) J Samper-Montaña	6	6
WC	(Romania) Dragoș Cristian Mîrtea	2	2
(Croatia) D Marcan	6	6
(Brazil) A Ghem	6	3	6
WC	(Romania) A Dăescu	4	6	3
(Croatia) N Mektić	6	6
2	(Portugal) G Elias	2	4

Second round
7	(Argentina) F Bagnis	3	6	7^{7}
(Austria) G Melzer	6	2	6^{5}
(Austria) M Linzer	3	4
3	(France) G Rufin	6	6
(Spain) J Samper-Montaña	3	6	7^{8}
(Croatia) D Marcan	6	2	6^{6}
(Brazil) A Ghem	6^{7}	7	3
(Croatia) N Mektić	7^{9}	5	6

Quarterfinals
7	(Argentina) F Bagnis	3	4
3	(France) G Rufin	6	6
(Spain) J Samper-Montaña	5	4
(Croatia) N Mektić	7	6

Semifinals
3	(France) G Rufin	6	7
(Croatia) N Mektić	3	5
