= 2013 Rai Open – Singles =

Singles
- 2013 Rai Open

Final
- Champion: (Germany) Julian Reister
- Runner-up: (Spain) Guillermo García-López
- Score: 4–6, 6–3, 6–2

Events
Singles	Doubles
← 2012 ·	Rai Open	· 2014 →

Roberto Bautista-Agut was the defending champion but decided not to participate.
Julian Reister defeated Guillermo García-López 4–6, 6–3, 6–2 in the final to win the title.

== Seeds ==
1. (Russia) Andrey Kuznetsov (second round)
2. (Czech Republic) Jan Hájek (second round)
3. (Spain) Guillermo García-López (final)
4. (Austria) Andreas Haider-Maurer (quarterfinals)
5. (Germany) Jan-Lennard Struff (second round)
6. (Romania) Marius Copil (first round)
7. (Germany) Björn Phau (second round)
8. (Belgium) Olivier Rochus (second round)

== Draw ==
=== Key ===
- Q = Qualifier
- WC = Wild card
- LL = Lucky loser
- Alt = Alternate
- SE = Special exempt
- PR = Protected ranking
- ITF = ITF entry
- JE = Junior exempt
- w/o = Walkover
- r = Retired
- d = Defaulted
- SR = Special ranking

=== Finals ===
Semifinals
(Germany) Julian Reister	6	7
(Serbia) Dušan Lajović	2	5
3	(Spain) Guillermo García-López	6	4	6
(Germany) Simon Greul	4	6	2

Final
(Germany) Julian Reister	4	6	6
3	(Spain) Guillermo García-López	6	3	2

=== Top half ===
First round
1	(Russia) A Kuznetsov	6^{2}	6	6
(Kazakhstan) E Korolev	7^{7}	2	1
WC	(Italy) F Baldi	1	1
(Germany) J Reister	6	6
(Ukraine) O Nedovyesov	6	4	6
(Germany) D Brown	2	6	2
(Germany) A Beck	4	6	4
5	(Germany) J-L Struff	6	4	6
4	(Austria) A Haider-Maurer	6	6
(Spain) P Carreño	3	2
WC	(Italy) G Quinzi	6	4	3
(Portugal) F Gil	4	6	6
(Turkey) M İlhan	0	1
WC	(Italy) P Starace	6	6
(Serbia) D Lajović	6	6
6	(Romania) M Copil	0	1

Second round
1	(Russia) A Kuznetsov	6	3	4
(Germany) J Reister	3	6	6
(Ukraine) O Nedovyesov	6	6
5	(Germany) J-L Struff	4	3
4	(Austria) A Haider-Maurer	6	6
(Portugal) F Gil	1	0
WC	(Italy) P Starace	4	6	5
(Serbia) D Lajović	6	1	7

Quarterfinals
(Germany) J Reister	6	6
(Ukraine) O Nedovyesov	2	3
4	(Austria) A Haider-Maurer	2	3
(Serbia) D Lajović	6	6

Semifinals
(Germany) J Reister	6	7
(Serbia) D Lajović	2	5

=== Bottom half ===
First round
7	(Germany) B Phau	6	6
Q	(Italy) A di Mauro	2	0
(Belarus) U Ignatik	5	6^{2}
(Czech Republic) J Veselý	7	7^{7}
WC	(Italy) S Napolitano	3	5
(Germany) D Meffert	6	7
Q	(Switzerland) S Ehrat	1	2
3	(Spain) G García-López	6	6
8	(Belgium) O Rochus	6	6
Q	(Austria) D Thiem	1	4
(Germany) B Knittel	2	4
(Germany) S Greul	6	6
Q	(Austria) M Fischer	5	6	7^{10}
(Czech Republic) J Mertl	7	0	6^{8}
(Kazakhstan) M Kukushkin	0	6	1
2	(Czech Republic) J Hájek	6	4	6

Second round
7	(Germany) B Phau	5	6	1
(Czech Republic) J Veselý	7	4	6
(Germany) D Meffert	5	3
3	(Spain) G García-López	7	6
8	(Belgium) O Rochus	7	6^{4}	3
(Germany) S Greul	5	7^{7}	6
Q	(Austria) M Fischer	6	3	7^{7}
2	(Czech Republic) J Hájek	4	6	6^{4}

Quarterfinals
(Czech Republic) J Veselý	4	1
3	(Spain) G García-López	6	6
(Germany) S Greul	6	7
Q	(Austria) M Fischer	3	5

Semifinals
3	(Spain) G García-López	6	4	6
(Germany) S Greul	4	6	2
