= 2013 BRD Timișoara Challenger – Doubles =

Doubles
- 2013 BRD Timișoara Challenger

Final
- Champions: (France) Jonathan Eysseric (France) Nicolas Renavand
- Runners-up: (Serbia) Ilija Vučić (Serbia) Miljan Zekić
- Score: 6–7^{(8–6)}, 6–2, [10–7]

Events
Singles	Doubles
← 2012 ·	BRD Timișoara Challenger	· 2014 →

Goran Tošić and Denis Zivkovic were the defending champions; however, Tošić did not participate.
Zivkovic teamed up with Vahid Mirzadeh and lost to Radu Albot and Victor Crivoi in the Quarterfinals.
Jonathan Eysseric and Nicolas Renavand defeated Ilija Vučić and Miljan Zekić 6–7^{(8–6)}, 6–2, [10–7] in the finals.

== Seeds ==
1. (Czech Republic) Jaroslav Pospíšil / (Germany) Alexander Satschko (first round)
2. (France) Jonathan Eysseric / (France) Nicolas Renavand (champions)
3. (United States) Vahid Mirzadeh / (United States) Denis Zivkovic (quarterfinals)
4. (Serbia) Nikola Ćirić / (Serbia) Boris Pašanski (semifinals)

== Draw ==
=== Key ===
- Q = Qualifier
- WC = Wild card
- LL = Lucky loser
- Alt = Alternate
- SE = Special exempt
- PR = Protected ranking
- ITF = ITF entry
- JE = Junior exempt
- w/o = Walkover
- r = Retired
- d = Defaulted
- SR = Special ranking

=== Draw ===
First round
1	(Czech Republic) J Pospíšil (Germany) A Satschko	3	6	[5]
(Tunisia) M Jaziri (Austria) G Melzer	6	4	[10]
(Serbia) Ilija Vučić (Serbia) M Zekić	6	6
WC	(Romania) VV Cornea (Romania) Tudor Șulea	3	4
4	(Serbia) N Ćirić (Serbia) B Pašanski	6	6
(Romania) P Ciorcilă (Romania) A Ungur	4	4
WC	(Romania) Sebastian Kraila (Romania) P-A Luncanu	6^{6}	3
(Italy) L Giustino (Austria) M Linzer	7^{8}	6
(France) D Guez (France) A Michon	2	2
(Moldova) R Albot (Romania) V Crivoi	6	6
(Poland) A Kapaś (Poland) G Panfil	6	4	[7]
3	(United States) V Mirzadeh (United States) D Zivkovic	2	6	[10]
WC	(Romania) Dragoș Cristian Mîrtea (United States) W Odesnik	6	6
(Croatia) N Mektić (Bosnia and Herzegovina) A Šetkić	1	1
(Moldova) A Ciumac (Ukraine) V Uzhylovskyi	6	4	[7]
2	(France) J Eysseric (France) N Renavand	4	6	[10]

Quarterfinals
(Tunisia) M Jaziri (Austria) G Melzer	1	2
(Serbia) I Vučić (Serbia) M Zekić	6	6
4	(Serbia) N Ćirić (Serbia) B Pašanski	6	7
(Italy) L Giustino (Austria) M Linzer	3	5
(Moldova) R Albot (Romania) V Crivoi	7	4	[10]
3	(United States) V Mirzadeh (United States) D Zivkovic	5	6	[3]
WC	(Romania) DC Mîrtea (United States) W Odesnik
2	(France) J Eysseric (France) N Renavand	w/o

Semifinals
(Serbia) I Vučić (Serbia) M Zekić	7^{7}	7
4	(Serbia) N Ćirić (Serbia) B Pašanski	6^{5}	5
(Moldova) R Albot (Romania) V Crivoi	3	5
2	(France) J Eysseric (France) N Renavand	6	7

Final
(Serbia) I Vučić (Serbia) M Zekić	7^{8}	2	[7]
2	(France) J Eysseric (France) N Renavand	6^{6}	6	[10]
