= 2012 BRD Timișoara Challenger =

- Date: 9–15 July
- Edition: 6th
- Surface: Clay
- Location: Timișoara, Romania

Champions

Singles
- (Romania) Victor Hănescu

Doubles
- (Montenegro) Goran Tošić / (United States) Denis Zivkovic
← 2008 ·	BRD Timișoara Challenger	· 2013 →

The 2012 BRD Timișoara Challenger was a professional tennis tournament played on clay courts. It was the sixth edition of the tournament which was part of the 2012 ATP Challenger Tour. It took place in Timișoara, Romania between 9 and 15 July 2012.

== Singles main draw entrants ==
=== Seeds ===
Country	Player	Rank^{1}	Seed
ROU	Victor Hănescu	153	1
POR	Gastão Elias	161	2
FRA	Guillaume Rufin	168	3
CZE	Dušan Lojda	192	4
FRA	Grégoire Burquier	198	5
ESP	Javier Martí	199	6
ARG	Facundo Bagnis	222	7
SVK	Kamil Čapkovič	224	8

- ^{1} Rankings are as of June 25, 2012.

=== Other entrants ===
The following players received wildcards into the singles main draw:

- (Romania) Andrei Dăescu
- (Romania) Dragoș Cristian Mîrtea
- (Romania) Florin Mergea

The following players received entry as an alternate into the singles main draw:

- (United States) Denis Zivkovic

The following players received entry from the qualifying draw:

- (Greece) Alexandros Jakupovic
- (United Kingdom) James Marsalek
- (Romania) Răzvan Sabău
- (Montenegro) Goran Tošić

== Champions ==
=== Singles ===
- (Romania) Victor Hănescu def. (France) Guillaume Rufin, 6–0, 6–3

=== Doubles ===
- (Montenegro) Goran Tošić / (United States) Denis Zivkovic def. (Romania) Andrei Dăescu / (Romania) Florin Mergea, 6–2, 7–5
