= 2013 Rai Open – Doubles =

Doubles
- 2013 Rai Open

Final
- Champions: (Germany) Andreas Beck (Austria) Martin Fischer
- Runners-up: (Germany) Martin Emmrich (Australia) Rameez Junaid
- Score: 7–6^{(7–2)}, 6–0

Events
| Singles | Doubles |
| ← 2012 · | Rai Open | · 2014 → |

Dustin Brown and Jonathan Marray were the defending champions but Marray decided not to participate.
Brown played alongside Jamie Delgado, but they lost in the quarterfinals to Dominik Meffert and Philipp Oswald.
Andreas Beck and Martin Fischer defeated Martin Emmrich and Rameez Junaid 7–6^{(7–2)}, 6–0 in the final to win the title.

== Seeds ==
1. (Germany) Dustin Brown / (United Kingdom) Jamie Delgado (quarterfinals)
2. (Germany) Martin Emmrich / (Australia) Rameez Junaid (final)
3. (Poland) Tomasz Bednarek / (Sweden) Andreas Siljeström (first round)
4. (Belarus) Uladzimir Ignatik / (Poland) Mateusz Kowalczyk (first round)

== Draw ==
=== Key ===
- Q = Qualifier
- WC = Wild card
- LL = Lucky loser
- Alt = Alternate
- SE = Special exempt
- PR = Protected ranking
- ITF = ITF entry
- JE = Junior exempt
- w/o = Walkover
- r = Retired
- d = Defaulted
- SR = Special ranking

=== Draw ===
First round
(Serbia) N Čačić (Serbia) D Lajović | 4 | 2
(Germany) D Meffert (Austria) P Oswald | 6 | 6
3 | (Poland) T Bednarek (Sweden) A Siljeström | 6 | 5 | [8]
(Italy) F Baldi (Italy) G Quinzi | 1 | 7 | [10]
(United States) Adham El-Effendi (United Kingdom) D Walsh | 6^{3} | 2
(Germany) A Beck (Austria) M Fischer | 7^{7} | 6
(Spain) MÁ López Jaén (Spain) Jordi Marsé-Vidri | 1 | 0
(Czech Republic) J Mertl (Ukraine) O Nedovyesov | 6 | 6
(Italy) M Cecchinato (Italy) S Napolitano | 3 | 6 | [10]
4 | (Belarus) U Ignatik (Poland) M Kowalczyk | 6 | 3 | [8]
(Italy) A di Mauro (Italy) A Motti | 6 | 6
(Italy) Massimo Capone (Italy) Marco Viola | 3 | 1
(Portugal) F Gil (Kazakhstan) M Kukushkin | 4 | 3
2 | (Germany) M Emmrich (Australia) R Junaid | 6 | 6

Quarterfinals
1 | (Germany) D Brown (United Kingdom) J Delgado | 4 | 1
(Germany) D Meffert (Austria) P Oswald | 6 | 6
(Italy) F Baldi (Italy) G Quinzi | 1 | 6^{3}
(Germany) A Beck (Austria) M Fischer | 6 | 7^{7}
(Czech Republic) J Mertl (Ukraine) O Nedovyesov | 6 | 7^{9}
(Italy) M Cecchinato (Italy) S Napolitano | 3 | 6^{7}
(Italy) A di Mauro (Italy) A Motti | 2 | 6^{2}
2 | (Germany) M Emmrich (Australia) R Junaid | 6 | 7^{7}

Semifinals
(Germany) D Meffert (Austria) P Oswald | 1 | 6^{7}
(Germany) A Beck (Austria) M Fischer | 6 | 7^{9}
(Czech Republic) J Mertl (Ukraine) O Nedovyesov | 6 | 4 | [6]
2 | (Germany) M Emmrich (Australia) R Junaid | 4 | 6 | [10]

Final
(Germany) A Beck (Austria) M Fischer | 7^{7} | 6
2 | (Germany) M Emmrich (Australia) R Junaid | 6^{2} | 0
