= 2014 Rome Open – Singles =

Singles
- 2014 Rome Open

Final
- Champion: (Germany) Julian Reister
- Runner-up: (Uruguay) Pablo Cuevas
- Score: 6–3, 6–2

Events
Singles	Doubles
← 2013 ·	Rome Open	· 2015 →

In the 2014 Rome Open in tennis, Aljaž Bedene was the defending singles champion, but decided not to compete.

Julian Reister won the title, defeating Pablo Cuevas in the final, 6–3, 6–2

== Seeds ==
1. (Serbia) Dušan Lajović (first round)
2. (Italy) Filippo Volandri (semifinals)
3. (Italy) Paolo Lorenzi (first round)
4. (Austria) Andreas Haider-Maurer (first round)
5. (Tunisia) Malek Jaziri (second round)
6. (Germany) Julian Reister (champion)
7. (United Kingdom) Daniel Evans (first round)
8. (Italy) Potito Starace (second round)

== Draw ==
=== Key ===
- Q = Qualifier
- WC = Wild card
- LL = Lucky loser
- Alt = Alternate
- SE = Special exempt
- PR = Protected ranking
- ITF = ITF entry
- JE = Junior exempt
- w/o = Walkover
- r = Retired
- d = Defaulted
- SR = Special ranking

=== Finals ===
Semifinals
6	(Germany) Julian Reister	6	2	6
(Italy) Marco Cecchinato	2	6	4
(Uruguay) Pablo Cuevas	6	6
2	(Italy) Filippo Volandri	3	1

Final
6	(Germany) Julian Reister	6	6
(Uruguay) Pablo Cuevas	3	2

=== Top half ===
First round
1	(Serbia) D Lajović	2	3
(Argentina) M González	6	6
WC	(Italy) A Giannessi	6^{2}	2
(Slovakia) N Gomboš	7^{7}	6
(Croatia) K Mesaroš	6^{2}	2
SE	(Croatia) M Delić	7^{7}	6
(Italy) F Cipolla	2	4
6	(Germany) J Reister	6	6
4	(Austria) A Haider-Maurer	6	5	2
Q	(Morocco) L Ouahab	4	7	6
(Netherlands) J Huta Galung	1	6	1
(Italy) M Cecchinato	6	3	6
(Italy) L Giustino	6	6
(Italy) T Fabbiano	4	3
Q	(Russia) Aleksandr Lobkov	3	4
5	(Tunisia) M Jaziri	6	6

Second round
(Argentina) M González	6	6
(Slovakia) N Gomboš	3	4
SE	(Croatia) M Delić	1	2
6	(Germany) J Reister	6	6
Q	(Morocco) L Ouahab	4	6	3
(Italy) M Cecchinato	6	3	6
(Italy) L Giustino	6	6
5	(Tunisia) M Jaziri	2	3

Quarterfinals
(Argentina) M González	3	6	2
6	(Germany) J Reister	6	4	6
(Italy) M Cecchinato	6	2	6
(Italy) L Giustino	2	6	4

Semifinals
6	(Germany) J Reister	6	2	6
(Italy) M Cecchinato	2	6	4

=== Bottom half ===
First round
8	(Italy) P Starace	6	6
Q	(Italy) S Caruso	4	4
WC	(Italy) G Quinzi	5	6	4
(Japan) T Daniel	7	4	6
(Moldova) R Albot	3	1
WC	(Italy) M Donati	6	6
(Uruguay) P Cuevas	6	1	6
3	(Italy) P Lorenzi	2	6	4
7	(United Kingdom) D Evans	6	1	1
SE	(Slovakia) M Mečíř Jr.	4	6	6
(Italy) A Arnaboldi	6	6
(Canada) S Diez	1	0
WC	(Italy) M Trevisan	3	0
(Lithuania) R Berankis	6	6
Q	(Moldova) M Dubarenco	1	3
2	(Italy) F Volandri	6	6

Second round
8	(Italy) P Starace	1	4
(Japan) T Daniel	6	6
WC	(Italy) M Donati	2	4
(Uruguay) P Cuevas	6	6
SE	(Slovakia) M Mečíř Jr.	6	3	6
(Italy) A Arnaboldi	4	6	2
(Lithuania) R Berankis	6^{5}	7	3
2	(Italy) F Volandri	7^{7}	5	6

Quarterfinals
(Japan) T Daniel	2	6	4
(Uruguay) P Cuevas	6	4	6
SE	(Slovakia) M Mečíř Jr.	6	1	1
2	(Italy) F Volandri	4	6	6

Semifinals
(Uruguay) P Cuevas	6	6
2	(Italy) F Volandri	3	1
