= 2009 Rai Open – Doubles =

Doubles
- 2009 Rai Open

Final
- Champions: (Germany) Simon Greul (Italy) Alessandro Motti
- Runners-up: (Italy) Daniele Bracciali (Italy) Filippo Volandri
- Score: 6–4, 7–5

Events
Singles	Doubles
← 2008 ·	Rai Open	· 2010 →

Simon Greul and Alessandro Motti won in the final 6–4, 7–5, against Daniele Bracciali and Filippo Volandri. They became the first champions of this tournament.

== Seeds ==
1. (Sweden) Johan Brunström / (Netherlands Antilles) Jean-Julien Rojer (semifinals)
2. (Germany) Christopher Kas / (Germany) Michael Kohlmann (semifinals)
3. (United States) James Cerretani / (Italy) Marco Crugnola (first round)
4. (Germany) Philipp Marx / (United States) Travis Rettenmaier (first round)

== Draw ==
=== Key ===
- Q = Qualifier
- WC = Wild card
- LL = Lucky loser
- Alt = Alternate
- SE = Special exempt
- PR = Protected ranking
- ITF = ITF entry
- JE = Junior exempt
- w/o = Walkover
- r = Retired
- d = Defaulted
- SR = Special ranking

=== Draw ===
First round
1	(Sweden) J Brunström (Netherlands Antilles) J-J Rojer	7	6
(Germany) F Moser (Czech Republic) L Rosol	6^{4}	2
(South Africa) K Anderson (Serbia) I Bozoljac	3	6^{5}
(Czech Republic) J Vaněk (Czech Republic) T Zíb	6	7
3	(United States) J Cerretani (Italy) M Crugnola	5	6	[6]
(France) O Charroin (France) N Tourte	7	4	[10]
(Germany) S Greul (Italy) A Motti	6	6
WC	(Italy) P Fanucci (Italy) D Giorgini	3	1
(Netherlands) J Huta Galung (Czech Republic) D Karol	6	1	[10]
ALT	(Slovenia) L Gregorc (Slovenia) G Žemlja	4	6	[8]
WC	(Italy) D Bracciali (Italy) F Volandri	5	6	[10]
4	(Germany) P Marx (United States) T Rettenmaier	7	4	[8]
WC	(Italy) E Fioravante (Italy) S Galvani	6	2	[12]
(Argentina) S Roitman (Brazil) M Torres	3	6	[10]
ALT	(Italy) A di Mauro (Italy) G Naso	4	2
2	(Germany) C Kas (Germany) M Kohlmann	6	6

Quarterfinals
1	(Sweden) J Brunström (Netherlands Antilles) J-J Rojer	6	1	[10]
(Czech Republic) J Vaněk (Czech Republic) T Zíb	3	6	[7]
(France) O Charroin (France) N Tourte	2	3
(Germany) S Greul (Italy) A Motti	6	6
(Netherlands) J Huta Galung (Czech Republic) D Karol	4	4
WC	(Italy) D Bracciali (Italy) F Volandri	6	6
WC	(Italy) E Fioravante (Italy) S Galvani	0	2
2	(Germany) C Kas (Germany) M Kohlmann	6	6

Semifinals
1	(Sweden) J Brunström (Netherlands Antilles) J-J Rojer	3	6	[6]
(Germany) S Greul (Italy) A Motti	6	3	[10]
WC	(Italy) D Bracciali (Italy) F Volandri	6^{6}	6	[10]
2	(Germany) C Kas (Germany) M Kohlmann	7	1	[7]

Finals
(Germany) S Greul (Italy) A Motti	6	7
WC	(Italy) D Bracciali (Italy) F Volandri	4	5
