= 2012 Rai Open – Singles =

Singles
- 2012 Rai Open

Final
- Champion: (Spain) Roberto Bautista-Agut
- Runner-up: (Portugal) Rui Machado
- Score: 6–7^{(7–9)}, 6–4, 6–3

Events
Singles	Doubles
- Rai Open

Thomas Schoorel was the defending champion.
Roberto Bautista-Agut won the final 6–7^{(7–9)}, 6–4, 6–3 against Rui Machado.

== Seeds ==
1. (Latvia) Ernests Gulbis (first round)
2. (Spain) Guillermo García-López (second round)
3. (Portugal) Rui Machado (final)
4. (Netherlands) Igor Sijsling (second round)
5. (Slovenia) Grega Žemlja (first round)
6. (France) Adrian Mannarino (first round)
7. (Turkey) Marsel İlhan (second round)
8. (Netherlands) Thomas Schoorel (first round)

== Draw ==
Key

- Q = Qualifier
- WC = Wild card
- LL = Lucky loser
- Alt = Alternate
- ITF = ITF entry
- PR = Protected ranking
- SR = Special ranking
- SE = Special exempt
- JE = Junior exempt
- JR = Junior Accelerator Programme entrant
- CO = College Accelerator Programme entrant
- NG = Next Gen Accelerator Program entrant
- w/o = Walkover
- r = Retired
- d = Defaulted

=== Finals ===
Semifinals
(Serbia) Dušan Lajović	2	1
(Spain) Roberto Bautista-Agut	6	6
3	(Portugal) Rui Machado	4	6	7^{10}
(Czech Republic) Jan Hájek	6	2	6^{8}

Final
(Spain) Roberto Bautista-Agut	6^{7}	6	6
3	(Portugal) Rui Machado	7^{9}	4	3

=== Top half ===
First round
1	(Latvia) E Gulbis	4	2
(Germany) S Greul	6	6
Q	(Belgium) M Authom	4	6	4
(France) M Teixeira	6	2	6
WC	(Italy) G Naso	4	6	6^{6}
(Serbia) D Lajović	6	1	7^{8}
(Spain) J Martí	6	6
5	(Slovenia) G Žemlja	4	4
4	(Netherlands) I Sijsling	6	5	7
(Italy) S Vagnozzi	3	7	5
(Spain) R Bautista-Agut	4	7	6
Q	(Spain) G Granollers	6	5	2
(Netherlands) J Huta Galung	6	6
WC	(Italy) V Santopadre	2	2
Q	(Serbia) F Krajinović	6	6
6	(France) A Mannarino	0	1

Second round
(Germany) S Greul	6	6
(France) M Teixeira	4	1
(Serbia) D Lajović	6	6
(Spain) J Martí	1	1
4	(Netherlands) I Sijsling	6^{6}	4
(Spain) R Bautista-Agut	7^{8}	6
(Netherlands) J Huta Galung	7	6
Q	(Serbia) F Krajinović	5	0

Quarterfinals
(Germany) S Greul	3	0^{r}
(Serbia) D Lajović	6	1
(Spain) R Bautista-Agut	w/o
(Netherlands) J Huta Galung

Semifinals
(Serbia) D Lajović	2	1
(Spain) R Bautista-Agut	6	6

=== Bottom half ===
First round
7	(Turkey) M İlhan	6	6
WC	(Italy) Nicola Barraco	3	2
(Czech Republic) D Lojda	3	5
(Portugal) J Sousa	6	7
(Kazakhstan) A Golubev	6	1	7
WC	(Italy) Marco Cecchinato	4	6	5
(Russia) E Donskoy	3	7^{7}	3
3	(Portugal) R Machado	6	6^{4}	6
8	(Netherlands) T Schoorel	1	6^{2}
(France) F Serra	6	7^{7}
(Lithuania) L Grigelis	3	2
(Russia) A Kuznetsov	6	6
(Czech Republic) J Hájek	3
Q	(Portugal) P Sousa	1^{r}
(Germany) D Brown	3	1
2	(Spain) G García-López	6	6

Second round
7	(Turkey) M İlhan	6	3	6^{0}
(Portugal) J Sousa	4	6	7^{7}
(Kazakhstan) A Golubev	6	6^{4}	2
3	(Portugal) R Machado	3	7^{7}	6
(France) F Serra	6	7^{7}
(Russia) A Kuznetsov	4	6^{4}
(Czech Republic) J Hájek	0	6	7^{7}
2	(Spain) G García-López	6	4	6^{1}

Quarterfinals
(Portugal) J Sousa	4	0
3	(Portugal) R Machado	6	6
(France) F Serra	5	4
(Czech Republic) J Hájek	7	6

Semifinals
3	(Portugal) R Machado	4	6	7^{10}
(Czech Republic) J Hájek	6	2	6^{8}
