= 2010 Rai Open – Singles =

Singles
- 2010 Rai Open

Final
- Champion: (Italy) Filippo Volandri
- Runner-up: (Algeria) Lamine Ouahab
- Score: 6–4, 7-5

Events
Singles	Doubles
← 2009 ·	Rai Open	· 2011 →

Sebastián Decoud was the defending champion, but chose to compete in Pereira instead.
Filippo Volandri won in the final 6–4, 7–5, against Lamine Ouahab.

== Seeds ==
1. (Austria) Daniel Köllerer (first round)
2. (Spain) Rubén Ramírez Hidalgo (first round)
3. (Belgium) Christophe Rochus (quarterfinals)
4. (Czech Republic) Jan Hernych (second round)
5. (Belgium) Kristof Vliegen (first round)
6. (Spain) Albert Ramos-Viñolas (second round)
7. (Romania) Adrian Ungur (first round)
8. (United States) Jesse Witten (second round)

== Draw ==
=== Key ===
- Q = Qualifier
- WC = Wild card
- LL = Lucky loser
- Alt = Alternate
- SE = Special exempt
- PR = Protected ranking
- ITF = ITF entry
- JE = Junior exempt
- w/o = Walkover
- r = Retired
- d = Defaulted
- SR = Special ranking

=== Finals ===
Semifinals
(Kazakhstan) Yuri Schukin	4	2
(Algeria) Lamine Ouahab	6	6
(Italy) Filippo Volandri	7	6
Q	(Netherlands) Jesse Huta Galung	5	1

Final
(Algeria) Lamine Ouahab	4	5
(Italy) Filippo Volandri	6	7

=== Top half ===
First round
1	(Austria) D Köllerer	4	3
(Czech Republic) J Vaněk	6	6
(Kazakhstan) Y Schukin	1	6	6
WC	(Italy) G Naso	6	3	2
WC	(Italy) A Comporto	0	3
(Argentina) F del Bonis	6	6
(Spain) D Marrero	5	6	1
6	(Spain) A Ramos-Viñolas	7	4	6
4	(Czech Republic) J Hernych	6	6
(Chile) J Aguilar	3	3
WC	(Italy) F Cipolla	4	1
(Netherlands) R Haase	6	6
WC	(Italy) M Trevisan	6^{6}	6	0
(Algeria) L Ouahab	7	4	6
(Spain) P Clar-Rosselló	4	6	4
8	(United States) J Witten	6	4	6

Second round
(Czech Republic) J Vaněk	3	4
(Kazakhstan) Y Schukin	6	6
(Argentina) F del Bonis	4	7	6
6	(Spain) A Ramos-Viñolas	6	6^{1}	2
4	(Czech Republic) J Hernych	5	6	2
(Netherlands) R Haase	7	0	6
(Algeria) L Ouahab	6	6
8	(United States) J Witten	3	1

Quarterfinals
(Kazakhstan) Y Schukin	6	6
(Argentina) F del Bonis	4	4
(Netherlands) R Haase	1	6^{4}
(Algeria) L Ouahab	6	7

Semifinals
(Kazakhstan) Y Schukin	4	2
(Algeria) L Ouahab	6	6

=== Bottom half ===
First round
5	(Belgium) K Vliegen	3	4
Q	(Italy) M Viola	6	6
(Argentina) M Vassallo Argüello	3	1
(Italy) F Volandri	6	6
(Italy) A Arnaboldi	6	2	4
(Switzerland) M Lammer	4	6	6
(Czech Republic) L Rosol	6	6^{2}	4
3	(Belgium) C Rochus	1	7	6
7	(Romania) A Ungur	3	2
Q	(Croatia) F Škugor	6	6
(Italy) A di Mauro	6	6
Q	(Serbia) B Pašanski	2	4
(Czech Republic) I Minář	6^{2}	2
(Spain) R Bautista-Agut	7	6
Q	(Netherlands) J Huta Galung	6^{3}	6	6
2	(Spain) R Ramírez Hidalgo	7	2	1

Second round
Q	(Italy) M Viola	6^{6}	6	6^{6}
(Italy) F Volandri	7	4	7
(Switzerland) M Lammer	3	2
3	(Belgium) C Rochus	6	6
Q	(Croatia) F Škugor	6	6
(Italy) A di Mauro	3	3
(Spain) R Bautista-Agut	6	0	1
Q	(Netherlands) J Huta Galung	3	6	6

Quarterfinals
(Italy) F Volandri	6	6
3	(Belgium) C Rochus	3	1
Q	(Croatia) F Škugor	3	3
Q	(Netherlands) J Huta Galung	6	6

Semifinals
(Italy) F Volandri	7	6
Q	(Netherlands) J Huta Galung	5	1
