= 2012 Rai Open =

- Date: 16–22 April
- Edition: 4th
- Surface: Clay
- Location: Rome, Italy

Champions

Singles
- (Spain) Roberto Bautista Agut

Doubles
- (Germany) Dustin Brown / (United Kingdom) Jonathan Marray
← 2011 ·	Rai Open	· 2013 →

The 2012 Rai Open was a professional tennis tournament played on clay courts. It was the fourth edition of the tournament which was part of the 2012 ATP Challenger Tour. It took place in Rome, Italy between 16 and 22 April 2012.

== Singles main draw entrants ==
=== Seeds ===
Country	Player	Rank^{1}	Seed
LAT	Ernests Gulbis	78	1
ESP	Guillermo García López	80	2
POR	Rui Machado	97	3
NED	Igor Sijsling	120	4
SLO	Grega Žemlja	126	5
FRA	Adrian Mannarino	127	6
TUR	Marsel İlhan	128	7
NED	Thomas Schoorel	131	8

- ^{1} Rankings are as of April 9, 2012.

=== Other entrants ===
The following players received wildcards into the singles main draw:

- (Italy) Nicola Barraco
- (Italy) Marco Cecchinato
- (Italy) Gianluca Naso
- (Italy) Vincenzo Santopadre

The following players received entry from the qualifying draw:

- (Belgium) Maxime Authom
- (Spain) Gerard Granollers
- (Serbia) Filip Krajinović
- (Portugal) Pedro Sousa

== Champions ==
=== Singles ===
- (Spain) Roberto Bautista Agut def. (Portugal) Rui Machado, 6–7 ^{(7–9)}, 6–4, 6–3

=== Doubles ===
- (Germany) Dustin Brown / (United Kingdom) Jonathan Marray def. (Romania) Andrei Dăescu / (Romania) Florin Mergea, 6–4, 7–6^{(7–0)}
