= 2011 Rai Open =

- Date: April 11 – April 17
- Edition: 3rd
- Location: Rome, Italy

Champions

Singles
- (Netherlands) Thomas Schoorel

Doubles
- (Slovakia) Martin Kližan / (Italy) Alessandro Motti
← 2010 ·	Rai Open	· 2012 →

The 2011 Rai Open was a professional tennis tournament played on clay courts. It was the third edition of the tournament which was part of the 2011 ATP Challenger Tour. It took place in Rome, Italy between 11 and 17 April 2011.

== ATP entrants ==
=== Seeds ===
Nationality	Player	Ranking*	Seeding
AUT	Andreas Haider-Maurer	96	1
GER	Björn Phau	112	2
TUR	Marsel İlhan	117	3
GER	Andreas Beck	122	4
GER	Julian Reister	125	5
CZE	Ivo Minář	131	6
GER	Simon Greul	132	7
AUT	Martin Fischer	135	8

- Rankings are as of April 4, 2011.

=== Other entrants ===
The following players received wildcards into the singles main draw:

- (Italy) Thomas Fabbiano
- (Italy) Alessandro Giannessi
- (Austria) Thomas Muster
- (Italy) Gianluca Naso

The following players received entry from the qualifying draw:

- (Spain) Pablo Carreño Busta
- (Slovakia) Pavol Červenák
- (Serbia) Boris Pašanski
- (Germany) Cedrik-Marcel Stebe
- (Croatia) Nikola Mektić (as a lucky loser)

== Champions ==
=== Singles ===
(Netherlands) Thomas Schoorel def. (Slovakia) Martin Kližan, 7–5, 1–6, 6–3

=== Doubles ===
(Slovakia) Martin Kližan / (Italy) Alessandro Motti def. (Italy) Thomas Fabbiano / (Italy) Walter Trusendi, 7–6(3), 6–4
