= 2013 Roma Open – Singles =

Singles
- 2013 Roma Open

Final
- Champion: (Slovenia) Aljaž Bedene
- Runner-up: (Italy) Filippo Volandri
- Score: 6–4, 6–2

Events
Singles	Doubles
- Roma Open

Jerzy Janowicz was the defending champion but decided to participate in the 2013 Mutua Madrid Open instead.
Aljaž Bedene defeated Filippo Volandri 6–4, 6–2 in the final to win the title.

== Seeds ==
1. (Spain) Albert Montañés (second round)
2. (Slovenia) Aljaž Bedene (champion)
3. (Slovenia) Blaž Kavčič (second round)
4. (Argentina) Guido Pella (second round)
5. ~~(France) Gaël Monfils~~ (withdrew)
6. (Austria) Andreas Haider-Maurer (quarterfinals)
7. (France) Adrian Mannarino (quarterfinals)
8. (Argentina) Federico Delbonis (semifinals)
9. (Belgium) Steve Darcis (first round)

== Draw ==
Key

- Q = Qualifier
- WC = Wild card
- LL = Lucky loser
- Alt = Alternate
- ITF = ITF entry
- PR = Protected ranking
- SR = Special ranking
- SE = Special exempt
- JE = Junior exempt
- JR = Junior Accelerator Programme entrant
- CO = College Accelerator Programme entrant
- NG = Next Gen Accelerator Program entrant
- w/o = Walkover
- r = Retired
- d = Defaulted

=== Finals ===
Semifinals
(Germany) Matthias Bachinger	6	5	1
(Italy) Filippo Volandri	1	7	6
8	(Argentina) Federico Delbonis	6	4	3
2	(Slovenia) Aljaž Bedene	3	6	6

Final
(Italy) Filippo Volandri	4	2
2	(Slovenia) Aljaž Bedene	6	6

=== Top half ===
First round
1	(Spain) A Montañés	6	7^{7}
LL	(Ukraine) Denys Mylokostov	3	6^{4}
(Germany) M Bachinger	6	6
(Australia) J Millman	4	1
(France) J Dasnières de Veigy	7	2	6
Q	(Kazakhstan) A Golubev	5	6	3
(Germany) S Greul	3	5
6	(Austria) A Haider-Maurer	6	7
4	(Argentina) G Pella	7^{7}	2	6
LL	(Germany) D Brown	6^{3}	6	3
Q	(Spain) A Menéndez-Maceiras	0	1
(Italy) F Volandri	6	6
(Belgium) M Authom	6	3	4
WC	(Italy) P Starace	4	6	6
(Serbia) D Lajović	6	6^{5}	6
9	(Belgium) S Darcis	3	7^{7}	4

Second round
1	(Spain) A Montañés	6	2	4
(Germany) M Bachinger	3	6	6
(France) J Dasnières de Veigy	1	7^{8}	2
6	(Austria) A Haider-Maurer	6	6^{6}	6
4	(Argentina) G Pella	6	3	1
(Italy) F Volandri	4	6	6
WC	(Italy) P Starace	3	2
(Serbia) D Lajović	6	6

Quarterfinals
(Germany) M Bachinger	3	6	7^{7}
6	(Austria) A Haider-Maurer	6	4	6^{0}
(Italy) F Volandri	6	7^{10}
(Serbia) D Lajović	3	6^{8}

Semifinals
(Germany) M Bachinger	6	5	1
(Italy) F Volandri	1	7	6

=== Bottom half ===
First round
8	(Argentina) F Delbonis	6	2
(Ukraine) I Sergeyev	2	0^{r}
Q	(Slovakia) A Martin	6	6
SE	(France) D Guez	1	3
(Romania) A Ungur	6	4	6
LL	(Germany) B Knittel	3	6	4
WC	(Italy) M Trevisan	4	6	6^{5}
3	(Slovenia) B Kavčič	6	2	7^{7}
7	(France) A Mannarino	6	6
(Argentina) DS Schwartzman	0	3
Q	(France) M Teixeira	6	4	5
(Kazakhstan) M Kukushkin	1	6	7
(Canada) V Pospisil	7^{7}	2	1
(Belgium) O Rochus	6^{5}	6	6
WC	(Argentina) E Schwank	1	4
2	(Slovenia) A Bedene	6	6

Second round
8	(Argentina) F Delbonis	7	6
Q	(Slovakia) A Martin	5	2
(Romania) A Ungur	6	6
3	(Slovenia) B Kavčič	3	2
7	(France) A Mannarino	7	7
(Kazakhstan) M Kukushkin	5	5
(Belgium) O Rochus
2	(Slovenia) A Bedene	w/o

Quarterfinals
8	(Argentina) F Delbonis	6	7
(Romania) A Ungur	3	5
7	(France) A Mannarino	2	6^{3}
2	(Slovenia) A Bedene	6	7^{7}

Semifinals
8	(Argentina) F Delbonis	6	4	3
2	(Slovenia) A Bedene	3	6	6
