= 2009 Rai Open =

- Date: April 13 – April 18
- Edition: 1st
- Location: Rome, Italy

Champions

Singles
- (Argentina) Sebastián Decoud

Doubles
- (Germany) Simon Greul / (Italy) Alessandro Motti
Rai Open	· 2010 →

The 2009 Rai Open was a professional tennis tournament played on outdoor red clay courts. It was part of the 2009 ATP Challenger Tour. It took place in Rome, Italy between 13 and 18 April 2009.

== Singles entrants ==
=== Seeds ===
Nationality	Player	Ranking*	Seeding
ARG	Sergio Roitman	98	1
GER	Simon Greul	112	2
CRO	Roko Karanušić	122	3
CZE	Jiří Vaněk	123	4
SRB	Ilija Bozoljac	134	5
CZE	Lukáš Rosol	137	6
ITA	Filippo Volandri	140	7
FRA	Alexandre Sidorenko	155	8

- Rankings are as of April 6, 2009.

=== Other entrants ===
The following players received wildcards into the singles main draw:

- (Italy) Daniele Bracciali
- (Italy) Thomas Fabbiano
- (Italy) Gianluca Naso
- (Italy) Filippo Volandri

The following players received entry from the qualifying draw:

- (Italy) Andrea Arnaboldi
- (France) Thierry Ascione
- (Brazil) Eric Gomes
- (Italy) Giancarlo Petrazzuolo
- (Italy) Stefano Galvani (as a Lucky loser)

The following player received special exempt into the main draw:

- (Italy) Alessio di Mauro
- (Croatia) Antonio Veić

== Champions ==
=== Men's singles ===
(Argentina) Sebastián Decoud def. (Germany) Simon Greul, 7–6(2), 6–1

=== Men's doubles ===
(Germany) Simon Greul / (Italy) Alessandro Motti def. (Italy) Daniele Bracciali / (Italy) Filippo Volandri, 6–4, 7–5
