= 2009 Rai Open – Singles =

Singles
- 2009 Rai Open

Final
- Champion: (Argentina) Sebastián Decoud
- Runner-up: (Germany) Simon Greul
- Score: 7–6(2), 6–1

Events
Singles	Doubles
← 2008 ·	Rai Open	· 2010 →

Sebastián Decoud defeated 7–6(2), 6–1 Simon Greul in the first singles' final of this tournament.

== Seeds ==
1. (Argentina) Sergio Roitman (first round)
2. (Germany) Simon Greul (final)
3. (Croatia) Roko Karanušić (first round)
4. (Czech Republic) Jiří Vaněk (quarterfinals)
5. (Serbia) Ilija Bozoljac (second round)
6. (Czech Republic) Lukáš Rosol (second round)
7. (Italy) Filippo Volandri (second round)
8. (France) Alexandre Sidorenko (first round)

== Draw ==
=== Key ===
- Q = Qualifier
- WC = Wild card
- LL = Lucky loser
- Alt = Alternate
- SE = Special exempt
- PR = Protected ranking
- ITF = ITF entry
- JE = Junior exempt
- w/o = Walkover
- r = Retired
- d = Defaulted
- SR = Special ranking

=== Final four ===
Semifinals
(Argentina) Sebastián Decoud	6	6
(Italy) Marco Crugnola	1	3
(France) Éric Prodon	3	3
2	(Germany) Simon Greul	6	6

Final
(Argentina) Sebastián Decoud	7	6
2	(Germany) Simon Greul	6^{2}	1

=== Top half ===
First round
1	(Argentina) S Roitman	3	6	0
(Argentina) S Decoud	6	3	6
(United States) M Russell	4	3
(Slovenia) L Gregorc	6	6
(Italy) T Tenconi	6	6
Q	(Brazil) E Gomes	2	4
(Kazakhstan) M Kukushkin	2	0
6	(Czech Republic) L Rosol	6	6
3	(Croatia) R Karanušić	4	3
Q	(France) T Ascione	6	6
(Italy) M Crugnola	6	6
(Spain) D Muñoz-De La Nava	1	4
Q	(Italy) A Arnaboldi	7	6
SE	(Italy) A di Mauro	5	1
(South Africa) K Anderson	3	4
5	(Serbia) I Bozoljac	6	6

Second round
(Argentina) S Decoud	7	5	6
(Slovenia) L Gregorc	6^{5}	7	4
(Italy) T Tenconi	3	6	6
6	(Czech Republic) L Rosol	6	2	3
Q	(France) T Ascione	4	3
(Italy) M Crugnola	6	6
Q	(Italy) A Arnaboldi	6^{5}	6	6
5	(Serbia) I Bozoljac	7	3	1

Quarterfinals
(Argentina) S Decoud	6	6
(Italy) T Tenconi	4	1
(Italy) M Crugnola	6	2	6
Q	(Italy) A Arnaboldi	0	6	4

Semifinals
(Argentina) S Decoud	6	6
(Italy) M Crugnola	1	3

=== Bottom half ===
First round
7/WC	(Italy) F Volandri	6	6
WC	(Italy) D Bracciali	2	4
WC	(Italy) G Naso	4	1
(France) É Prodon	6	6
(Belgium) X Malisse	3	2
(Brazil) R Hocevar	6	6
LL	(Italy) S Galvani	4	2
4	(Czech Republic) J Vaněk	6	6
8	(France) A Sidorenko	4	3
SE	(Croatia) A Veić	6	6
(Slovenia) G Žemlja	5	7	4
(Netherlands) J Huta Galung	7	5	6
WC	(Italy) T Fabbiano	7	6
Q	(Italy) G Petrazzuolo	5	4
(Belgium) R Bemelmans	4	2
2	(Germany) S Greul	6	6

Second round
7/WC	(Italy) F Volandri	2	6	6^{0}
(France) É Prodon	6	3	7
(Brazil) R Hocevar	3	4
4	(Czech Republic) J Vaněk	6	6
SE	(Croatia) A Veić	3	2
(Netherlands) J Huta Galung	6	6
WC	(Italy) T Fabbiano	0	2
2	(Germany) S Greul	6	6

Quarterfinals
(France) É Prodon	6	6
4	(Czech Republic) J Vaněk	3	4
(Netherlands) J Huta Galung	4	2
2	(Germany) S Greul	6	6

Semifinals
(France) É Prodon	3	3
2	(Germany) S Greul	6	6
