= 2013 Rai Open =

- Date: 15 – 21 April
- Edition: 5th
- Draw: 32S / 15D
- Prize money: €30,000+H
- Surface: Clay
- Location: Rome, Italy

Champions

Singles
- (Germany) Julian Reister

Doubles
- (Germany) Andreas Beck / (Austria) Martin Fischer
← 2012 ·	Rai Open	· 2014 →

The 2013 Rai Open was a professional tennis tournament played on clay courts. It was the fifth edition of the tournament which was part of the 2013 ATP Challenger Tour. It took place in Rome, Italy between 15 and 21 April 2013.

== Singles main draw entrants ==
=== Seeds ===
Country	Player	Rank^{1}	Seed
RUS	Andrey Kuznetsov	75	1
CZE	Jan Hájek	83	2
ESP	Guillermo García López	99	3
AUT	Andreas Haider-Maurer	110	4
GER	Jan-Lennard Struff	115	5
ROU	Marius Copil	127	6
GER	Björn Phau	135	7
BEL	Olivier Rochus	142	8

- ^{1} Rankings are as of April 8, 2013.

=== Other entrants ===
The following players received wildcards into the singles main draw:

- (Italy) Filippo Baldi
- (Italy) Gianluigi Quinzi
- (Italy) Stefano Napolitano
- (Italy) Potito Starace

The following players received entry from the qualifying draw:

- (Italy) Alessio di Mauro
- (Switzerland) Sandro Ehrat
- (Austria) Martin Fischer
- (Austria) Dominic Thiem

== Doubles main draw entrants ==
=== Seeds ===
Country	Player	Country	Player	Rank^{1}	Seed
GER	Dustin Brown	GBR	Jamie Delgado	142	1
GER	Martin Emmrich	AUS	Rameez Junaid	164	2
POL	Tomasz Bednarek	SWE	Andreas Siljeström	200	3
BLR	Uladzimir Ignatik	POL	Mateusz Kowalczyk	284	4

- ^{1} Rankings as of April 8, 2013.

== Champions ==
=== Singles ===
- (Germany) Julian Reister def. (Spain) Guillermo García López, 4–6, 6–3, 6–2

=== Doubles ===
- (Germany) Andreas Beck / (Austria) Martin Fischer def. (Germany) Martin Emmrich / (Australia) Rameez Junaid, 7–6^{(7–2)}, 6–0
