= 2014 Rome Open – Doubles =

Doubles
- 2014 Rome Open

Final
- Champions: (Moldova) Radu Albot (New Zealand) Artem Sitak
- Runners-up: (Italy) Andrea Arnaboldi (Italy) Flavio Cipolla
- Score: 4–6, 6–2, [11–9]

Events
| Singles | Doubles |
- Rome Open

Andreas Beck and Martin Fischer were the defending champions, but decided not to compete.

Radu Albot and Artem Sitak won the title, defeating Andrea Arnaboldi and Flavio Cipolla in the final, 4–6, 6–2, [11–9].

== Seeds ==
1. (Poland) Tomasz Bednarek / (Romania) Florin Mergea (first round)
2. (Italy) Daniele Bracciali / (Uruguay) Pablo Cuevas (first round)
3. (Czech Republic) František Čermák / (Russia) Michail Elgin (quarterfinals)
4. (United Kingdom) Ken Skupski / (United Kingdom) Neal Skupski (first round)

== Draw ==
Key

- Q = Qualifier
- WC = Wild card
- LL = Lucky loser
- Alt = Alternate
- ITF = ITF entry
- PR = Protected ranking
- SR = Special ranking
- SE = Special exempt
- JE = Junior exempt
- JR = Junior Accelerator Programme entrant
- CO = College Accelerator Programme entrant
- NG = Next Gen Accelerator Program entrant
- w/o = Walkover
- r = Retired
- d = Defaulted

=== Draw ===
First round
1 | (Poland) T Bednarek (Romania) F Mergea | 4 | 6 | [8]
(Italy) R Ghedin (Italy) C Grassi | 6 | 2 | [10]
WC | (Italy) A Brizzi (Italy) W Trusendi | 4 | 6 | [7]
(Poland) Piotr Gadomski (Poland) M Kowalczyk | 6 | 4 | [10]
3 | (Czech Republic) F Čermák (Russia) M Elgin | 6 | 7
(Netherlands) JH Galung (Serbia) G Tošić | 3 | 5
WC | (Italy) Danilo Gargano (Italy) Alesio Luchetti | 7^{8} | 1 | [3]
(Italy) A Arnaboldi (Italy) F Cipolla | 6^{6} | 6 | [10]
(Netherlands) S Fransen (Netherlands) W Koolhof | 2 | 6 | [6]
WC | (Italy) G Quinzi (Italy) A Virgili | 6 | 4 | [10]
(Argentina) G Durán (Argentina) M González | 6 | 6
4 | (United Kingdom) K Skupski (United Kingdom) N Skupski | 4 | 2
(India) P Raja (India) D Sharan | 6 | 4 | [6]
(Tunisia) M Jaziri (Morocco) L Ouahab | 2 | 6 | [10]
(Moldova) R Albot (New Zealand) A Sitak | 7 | 3 | [10]
2 | (Italy) D Bracciali (Uruguay) P Cuevas | 5 | 6 | [6]

Quarterfinals
(Italy) R Ghedin (Italy) C Grassi | 6 | 6
(Poland) P Gadomski (Poland) M Kowalczyk | 3 | 2
3 | (Czech Republic) F Čermák (Russia) M Elgin | 6 | 6^{4} | [4]
(Italy) A Arnaboldi (Italy) F Cipolla | 4 | 7^{7} | [10]
WC | (Italy) G Quinzi (Italy) A Virgili | 3 | 6 | [3]
(Argentina) G Durán (Argentina) M González | 6 | 3 | [10]
(Tunisia) M Jaziri (Morocco) L Ouahab | 3 | 4
(Moldova) R Albot (New Zealand) A Sitak | 6 | 6

Semifinals
(Italy) R Ghedin (Italy) C Grassi | 4 | 4
(Italy) A Arnaboldi (Italy) F Cipolla | 6 | 6
(Argentina) G Durán (Argentina) M González | 1 | 6 | [6]
(Moldova) R Albot (New Zealand) A Sitak | 6 | 4 | [10]

Final
(Italy) A Arnaboldi (Italy) F Cipolla | 6 | 2 | [9]
(Moldova) R Albot (New Zealand) A Sitak | 4 | 6 | [11]
