= 2013 BRD Timișoara Challenger =

- Date: 30 June – 7 July
- Edition: 7th
- Surface: Clay
- Location: Timișoara, Romania

Champions

Singles
- (Austria) Andreas Haider-Maurer

Doubles
- (France) Jonathan Eysseric / (France) Nicolas Renavand
← 2012 ·	BRD Timișoara Challenger	· 2014 →

The 2013 BRD Timișoara Challenger was a professional tennis tournament played on clay courts. It was the seventh edition of the tournament which was part of the 2013 ATP Challenger Tour. It took place in Timișoara, Romania between 30 June and 9 July 2013.

== Singles main draw entrants ==
=== Seeds ===
Country	Player	Rank^{1}	Seed
ROU	Adrian Ungur	94	1
USA	Wayne Odesnik	107	2
AUT	Andreas Haider-Maurer	108	3
ESP	Rubén Ramírez Hidalgo	119	4
ROU	Marius Copil	125	5
ESP	Pablo Carreno Busta	126	6
TUN	Malek Jaziri	171	7
FRA	David Guez	176	8

- ^{1} Rankings are as of June 24, 2013.

=== Other entrants ===
The following players received wildcards into the singles main draw:

- (Romania) Patrick Ciorcilă
- (Romania) Victor Vlad Cornea
- (Romania) Petru-Alexandru Luncanu
- (Romania) Dragoș Cristian Mîrtea

The following player received entry as an alternate into the singles main draw:

- (Czech Republic) Jaroslav Pospíšil

The following players received entry from the qualifying draw:

- (Italy) Lorenzo Giustino
- (Austria) Michael Linzer
- (France) Axel Michon
- (Serbia) Miljan Zekić

== Champions ==
=== Singles ===
- (Austria) Andreas Haider-Maurer def. (Spain) Rubén Ramírez Hidalgo 6–4, 3–6, 6–4

=== Doubles ===
- (France) Jonathan Eysseric / (France) Nicolas Renavand def. (Serbia) Ilija Vučić / (Serbia) Miljan Zekić 6–7^{(8–6)}, 6–2, [10–7]
