= 2013 Roma Open – Doubles =

Doubles
- 2013 Roma Open

Final
- Champions: (Germany) Andre Begemann (Germany) Martin Emmrich
- Runners-up: (Germany) Philipp Marx (Romania) Florin Mergea
- Score: 7–6^{(7–4)}, 6–3

Events
Singles	Doubles
← 2012 ·	Roma Open	· 2014 →

Jamie Delgado and Ken Skupski were the defending champions, but decided not to participate together.
Delgado played alongside Andreas Siljeström, but they lost to Philipp Marx and Florin Mergea in the second round, while Skupski partnered with Andreas Beck, but they lost to Dustin Brown and Rameez Junaid in the first round.
Andre Begemann and Martin Emmrich defeated Marx and Mergea 7–6^{(7–4)}, 6–3 in the final to win the title.

== Seeds ==
1. (Germany) Andre Begemann / (Germany) Martin Emmrich (champions)
2. (Germany) Philipp Marx / (Romania) Florin Mergea (final)
3. (United States) Nicholas Monroe / (Germany) Simon Stadler (quarterfinals)
4. (Israel) Andy Ram / (Brazil) André Sá (first round)

== Draw ==
=== Key ===
- Q = Qualifier
- WC = Wild card
- LL = Lucky loser
- Alt = Alternate
- SE = Special exempt
- PR = Protected ranking
- ITF = ITF entry
- JE = Junior exempt
- w/o = Walkover
- r = Retired
- d = Defaulted
- SR = Special ranking

=== Draw ===
First round
1	(Germany) A Begemann (Germany) M Emmrich	4	6	[10]
(Argentina) F Delbonis (Argentina) DS Schwartzman	6	3	[4]
(Germany) D Brown (Australia) R Junaid	3	6	[10]
PR	(Germany) A Beck (United Kingdom) K Skupski	6	3	[4]
4	(Israel) A Ram (Brazil) A Sá	6^{5}	3
(Poland) T Bednarek (Poland) M Kowalczyk	7^{7}	6
(Germany) M Bachinger (Germany) F Moser	7^{7}	4	[5]
WC	(Italy) D Giorgini (Italy) W Trusendi	6^{4}	6	[10]
(Kazakhstan) A Golubev (Denmark) F Nielsen	6	4	[10]
(Italy) A Motti (Italy) Matteo Volante	4	6	[6]
(Slovakia) A Martin (Slovakia) I Zelenay	6	6^{3}	[5]
3	(United States) N Monroe (Germany) S Stadler	4	7^{7}	[10]
(United Kingdom) J Delgado (Sweden) A Siljeström	w/o
Alt	(Spain) A Menéndez-Maceiras (Romania) A Ungur
(Argentina) G Pella (Argentina) E Schwank	6^{4}	4
2	(Germany) P Marx (Romania) F Mergea	7^{7}	6

Quarterfinals
1	(Germany) A Begemann (Germany) M Emmrich	6	1	[10]
(Germany) D Brown (Australia) R Junaid	1	6	[3]
(Poland) T Bednarek (Poland) M Kowalczyk	6	4	[10]
WC	(Italy) D Giorgini (Italy) W Trusendi	3	6	[8]
(Kazakhstan) A Golubev (Denmark) F Nielsen	6	6
3	(United States) N Monroe (Germany) S Stadler	4	4
(United Kingdom) J Delgado (Sweden) A Siljeström	4	2
2	(Germany) P Marx (Romania) F Mergea	6	6

Semifinals
1	(Germany) A Begemann (Germany) M Emmrich	7^{7}	7^{7}
(Poland) T Bednarek (Poland) M Kowalczyk	6^{4}	6^{4}
(Kazakhstan) A Golubev (Denmark) F Nielsen	2	2
2	(Germany) P Marx (Romania) F Mergea	6	6

Final
1	(Germany) A Begemann (Germany) M Emmrich	7^{7}	6
2	(Germany) P Marx (Romania) F Mergea	6^{4}	3
