= 2010 Rai Open =

- Date: April 12 – April 18
- Edition: 2nd
- Location: Rome, Italy

Champions

Singles
- (Italy) Filippo Volandri

Doubles
- (Poland) Tomasz Bednarek / (Poland) Mateusz Kowalczyk
← 2009 ·	Rai Open	· 2011 →

The 2010 Rai Open was a professional tennis tournament played on outdoor red clay courts. It was part of the 2010 ATP Challenger Tour. It took place in Rome, Italy between 12 and 18 April 2009.

== ATP entrants ==
=== Seeds ===
Nationality	Player	Ranking*	Seeding
AUT	Daniel Köllerer	93	1
ESP	Rubén Ramírez Hidalgo	119	2
BEL	Christophe Rochus	133	3
CZE	Jan Hernych	136	4
BEL	Kristof Vliegen	148	5
ESP	Albert Ramos-Viñolas	154	6
ROU	Adrian Ungur	165	7
USA	Jesse Witten	166	8

- Rankings are as of April 5, 2010.

=== Other entrants ===
The following players received wildcards into the singles main draw:

- (Italy) Flavio Cipolla
- (Italy) Antonio Comporto
- (Italy) Gianluca Naso
- (Italy) Matteo Trevisan

The following players received entry from the qualifying draw:

- (Netherlands) Jesse Huta Galung
- (Serbia) Boris Pašanski
- (Croatia) Franko Škugor
- (Italy) Matteo Viola

== Champions ==
=== Singles ===
(Italy) Filippo Volandri def. (Algeria) Lamine Ouahab, 6–4, 7-5

=== Doubles ===
(Poland) Tomasz Bednarek / (Poland) Mateusz Kowalczyk def. (South Africa) Jeff Coetzee / (United States) Jesse Witten, 6–4, 7–6(4)
