= 2013 Roma Open =

- Date: 6–12 May
- Edition: 12th
- Draw: 32S / 16D
- Prize money: €30,000+H
- Surface: Clay
- Location: Rome, Italy

Champions

Singles
- (Slovenia) Aljaž Bedene

Doubles
- (Germany) Andre Begemann / (Germany) Martin Emmrich
← 2012 ·	Roma Open	· 2014 →

The 2013 Roma Open was a professional tennis tournament played on clay courts. It was the twelfth edition of the tournament which was part of the 2013 ATP Challenger Tour. It took place in Rome, Italy between 6 and 12 May 2013.

== Singles main draw entrants ==
=== Seeds ===
Country	Player	Rank^{1}	Seed
ESP	Albert Montañés	84	1
SVN	Aljaž Bedene	85	2
SVN	Blaž Kavčič	97	3
ARG	Guido Pella	102	4
FRA	~~Gaël Monfils~~	103	5
AUT	Andreas Haider-Maurer	105	6
FRA	Adrian Mannarino	109	7
ARG	Federico Delbonis	112	8
BEL	Steve Darcis	115	9

- ^{1} Rankings are as of April 29, 2013.

=== Other entrants ===
The following players received wildcards into the singles main draw:

- (Argentina) Eduardo Schwank
- (Italy) Potito Starace
- (Italy) Matteo Trevisan

The following players received entry as a special exempt into the singles main draw:

- (France) David Guez

The following players received entry from the qualifying draw:

- (Kazakhstan) Andrey Golubev
- (Slovakia) Andrej Martin
- (Spain) Adrián Menéndez Maceiras
- (France) Maxime Teixeira

The following players received entry as lucky losers:

- (Germany) Dustin Brown
- (Germany) Bastian Knittel
- (Ukraine) Denys Mylokostov

== Doubles main draw entrants ==
=== Seeds ===
Country	Player	Country	Player	Rank^{1}	Seed
GER	Andre Begemann	GER	Martin Emmrich	122	1
GER	Philipp Marx	ROU	Florin Mergea	142	2
USA	Nicholas Monroe	GER	Simon Stadler	159	3
ISR	Andy Ram	BRA	André Sá	176	4

- ^{1} Rankings as of April 29, 2013.

=== Other entrants ===
The following pairs received wildcards into the doubles main draw:

- (Italy) Daniele Giorgini / (Italy) Walter Trusendi

The following pair received entry using a protected ranking:

- (Germany) Andreas Beck / (United Kingdom) Ken Skupski

The following pair received entry as an alternate into the doubles main draw:

- (Spain) Adrián Menéndez Maceiras / (Romania) Adrian Ungur

== Champions ==
=== Singles ===
- (Slovenia) Aljaž Bedene def. (Italy) Filippo Volandri, 6–4, 6–2

=== Doubles ===
- (Germany) Andre Begemann / (Germany) Martin Emmrich def. (Germany) Philipp Marx / (Romania) Florin Mergea, 7–6^{(7–4)}, 6–3
