= 2014 Rome Open =

- Date: 5 – 10 May
- Edition: 6th
- Draw: 32S / 15D
- Prize money: €42,500
- Surface: Clay
- Location: Rome, Italy

Champions

Singles
- (Germany) Julian Reister

Doubles
- (Moldova) Radu Albot / (New Zealand) Artem Sitak
← 2013 ·	Rome Open	· 2015 →

The 2014 Rome Open was a professional tennis tournament played on clay courts. It was the sixth edition of the tournament which was part of the 2014 ATP Challenger Tour. It took place in Rome, Italy between 5 and 10 May 2014.

== Singles main-draw entrants ==
=== Seeds ===
Country	Player	Rank^{1}	Seed
SRB	Dušan Lajović	75	1
ITA	Filippo Volandri	84	2
ITA	Paolo Lorenzi	87	3
AUT	Andreas Haider-Maurer	110	4
TUN	Malek Jaziri	118	5
GER	Julian Reister	129	6
GBR	Daniel Evans	133	7
ITA	Potito Starace	139	8

- ^{1} Rankings are as of April 28, 2014.

=== Other entrants ===
The following players received wildcards into the singles main draw:

- (Italy) Matteo Donati
- (Italy) Alessandro Giannessi
- (Italy) Gianluigi Quinzi
- (Italy) Matteo Trevisan

The following players received special exempt into the singles main draw:

- (Croatia) Mate Delić
- (Slovakia) Miloslav Mečíř Jr.

The following players received entry from the qualifying draw:

- (Morocco) Lamine Ouahab
- (Russia) Alexander Lobkov
- (Italy) Salvatore Caruso
- (Moldova) Maxim Dubarenco

== Doubles main-draw entrants ==
=== Seeds ===
Country	Player	Country	Player	Rank^{1}	Seed
POL	Tomasz Bednarek	ROU	Florin Mergea	92	1
ITA	Daniele Bracciali	URU	Pablo Cuevas	102	2
CZE	František Čermák	RUS	Michail Elgin	124	3
GBR	Ken Skupski	GBR	Neal Skupski	141	4

- ^{1} Rankings as of April 28, 2014.

=== Other entrants ===
The following pairs received wildcards into the singles main draw:

- (Italy) Alberto Brizzi / (Italy) Walter Trusendi
- (Italy) Danilo Gargano / (Italy) Alesio Luchetti
- (Italy) Gianluigi Quinzi / (Italy) Adelchi Virgili

== Champions ==
=== Singles ===
- (Germany) Julian Reister def. (Uruguay) Pablo Cuevas, 6–3, 6–2

=== Doubles ===
- (Moldova) Radu Albot / (New Zealand) Artem Sitak def. (Italy) Andrea Arnaboldi / (Italy) Flavio Cipolla, 4–6, 6–2, [11–9]
