= Andrei Dăescu =

Romanian tennis player

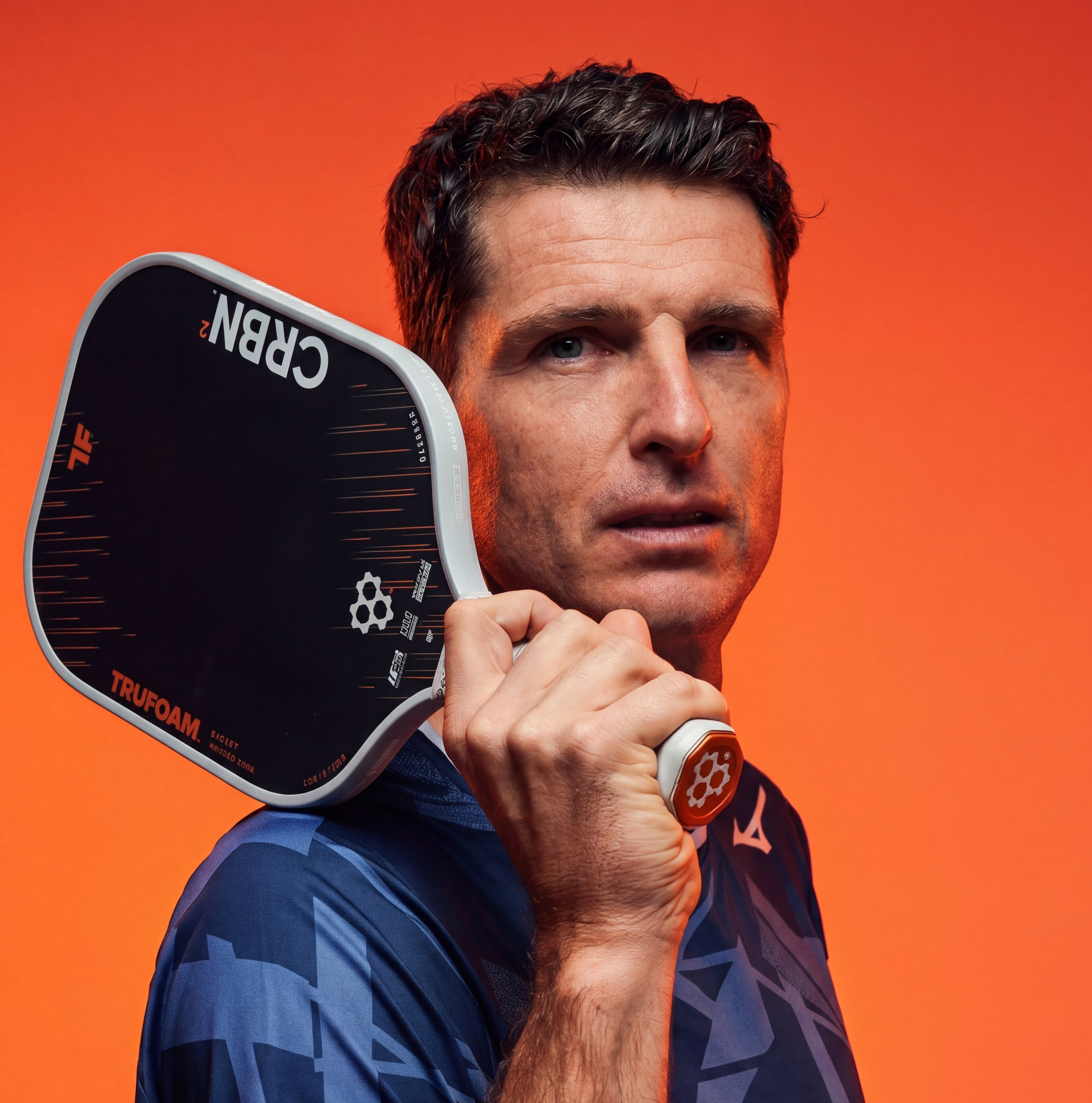
- Country (sports): Romania
- Born: 28 February 1988 (age 38)
- Plays: Right Handed (Double Handed Backhand)

Singles
- Career record: 0–1
- Career titles: 0
- Highest ranking: No. 654 (27 February 2012)
- Current ranking: No. 680 (2 April 2012)

Doubles
- Career record: 0–1
- Career titles: 0
- Highest ranking: No. 126 (8 October 2012)
- Current ranking: No. 1199 (8 June 2014)

Grand Slam mixed doubles results
- US Open: 1R (2015)
- Last updated on: 2 April 2012.

Andrei Dăescu (born 28 February 1988) is a former Romanian professional tennis player who now competes as a professional pickleball player. During his tennis career, he competed on both the ITF Men's Circuit and ATP Tour, representing Romania in the Davis Cup competition. A notable highlight of his career was qualifying for the 2015 US Open. Dăescu achieved a career-high ATP ranking of No. 126 in doubles and No. 654 in singles.

He was coached by Silviu Tănăsoiu and John Roddick, and he is an alumnus of the University of Oklahoma.

== Career finals ==
=== Doubles finals: 3 (1–2) ===
Legend Grand Slam tournaments (0–0) ATP World Tour Finals (0–0) ATP World Tour Masters 1000 (0–0) ATP World Tour 500 Series (0–0) ATP World Tour 250 Series (0–0) ATP Challenger Tour (1–2)	Titles by surface Hard (0–0) Grass (0–0) Clay (1–2) Carpet (0–0)

Outcome	No.	Date	Tournament	Surface	Partner	Opponents in the final	Score
Runner-up	1.	21 April 2012	Rome, Italy	Clay	(Romania) Florin Mergea	(Germany) Dustin Brown (United Kingdom) Jonathan Marray	4–6, 6–7^{(0–7)}
Runner-up	2.	14 July 2012	Timișoara, Romania	Clay	(Romania) Florin Mergea	(Montenegro) Goran Tošić (United States) Denis Zivkovic	2–6, 5–7
Winner	3.	29 July 2012	Oberstaufen, Germany	Clay	(Romania) Florin Mergea	(Russia) Andrey Kuznetsov (New Zealand) Jose Rubin Statham	7–6^{(7–4)}, 7–6^{(7–1)}

== Davis Cup ==
=== Singles performances (0–1) ===
Edition	Round	Date	Against	Surface	Opponent	Win/Lose	Result
2012 Europe/Africa Zone Group I	2R	6–8 April 2012	Netherlands	Hard (i)	(Netherlands) Robin Haase	Lose	3–6, 3–6, 4–6

=== Doubles performances (0–1) ===
Edition	Round	Date	Partner	Against	Surface	Opponents	Win/Lose	Result
2012 Europe/Africa Zone Group I	2R	6–8 April 2012	(Romania) Florin Mergea	Netherlands	Hard (i)	(Netherlands) Jean-Julien Rojer (Netherlands) Igor Sijsling	Lose	3–6, 6^{3}–7^{7}, 7^{7}–6^{3}, 6–3, 7–9

== Pickleball Career ==
Dăescu transitioned to pickleball in 2017, quickly excelling in the sport. He began his professional career with the Association of Pickleball Players (APP), where he won a total of 24 gold medals and in 2022 achieved the #1 ranking in both men's doubles and mixed doubles divisions. He also won the 2023 US Open title in men's doubles.

He later expanded his career to include playing in both the Professional Pickleball Association (PPA) tour and Major League Pickleball (MLP). With the Orlando Squeeze, he secured his first MLP championship title in Atlanta. After a season with the Arizona Drive, he now plays for the Columbus Sliders. He won the 2025 MLP championship with the Sliders, his second MLP title. On the PPA tour, he has accumulated six gold medals in men's doubles and one in mixed doubles — most recently a men's doubles gold medal at the 2025 PPA Mesa Open in a 5 set thriller vs Ben Johns and Gabe Tardio. As of June 1, 2026, he ranks #4 in men's doubles and #5 in men's mixed doubles on the PPA tour.

== Sponsors ==
Dăescu's sponsors include CRBN Pickleball and Mizuno. He currently uses the CRBN Barrage paddle.
