= Denis Zivkovic =

American tennis player (born 1987)

- Country (sports): United States
- Residence: United States
- Born: September 30, 1987 (age 38) Shreveport, Louisiana, United States
- Turned pro: 2004
- Plays: Right-handed
- Prize money: US$ 90,393

Singles
- Career record: 0–0 (in ATP World Tour and Grand Slam main draw matches, and in Davis Cup)
- Career titles: 0 (ATP World Tour and Grand Slam)
- Highest ranking: No. 292 (18 March 2013)

Doubles
- Career record: 1–2 (in ATP World Tour and Grand Slam main draw matches, and in Davis Cup)
- Career titles: 0 (ATP World Tour and Grand Slam)
- Highest ranking: No. 161 (5 August 2013)

Denis Zivkovic (born September 30, 1987) is an American professional tennis player and competes mainly on the ATP Challenger Tour and ITF Futures, both in singles and doubles.

Denis was sponsored by several prominent tennis and sports brands.

Zivkovic reached his highest ATP singles ranking No. 292 achieved on 18 March 2013 and his highest ATP doubles ranking No. 161 achieved on 5 August 2013.

== ATP career finals (2) ==
=== Singles (1) ===
Legend ATP Challengers (1)	Finals by surface Hard (1–0) Clay (0–0) Grass (0–0) Carpet (0–0)

Outcome	No.	Date	Tournament	Surface	Opponent in the final	Score
Winner	1.	April 15, 2012	León, Mexico	Hard	(United States) Rajeev Ram	7–6^{(7–5)}, 6–4

=== Doubles (1) ===
Legend ATP Challengers (1)	Finals by surface Hard (0–0) Clay (1–0) Grass (0–0) Carpet (0–0)

Outcome	No.	Date	Tournament	Surface	Partnering	Opponents in the final	Score
Winner	1.	April 15, 2012	Timișoara, Romania	Clay	(Montenegro) Goran Tošić	(Romania) Andrei Dăescu (Romania) Florin Mergea	6–2, 7–5

== Personal ==
He was born in United States of Serbian descent, but his family moved to Miami when he was seven.
