= BRD Timișoara Challenger =

Timișoara Challenger
- 2013 BRD Timișoara Challenger

Defunct tennis tournament
- Location: Timișoara, Romania
- Venue: Enel Romania Sports Center
- Category: ATP Challenger Tour
- Surface: Clay – Outdoors
- Draw: 32S/10Q/16D
- Prize money: €30,000+H

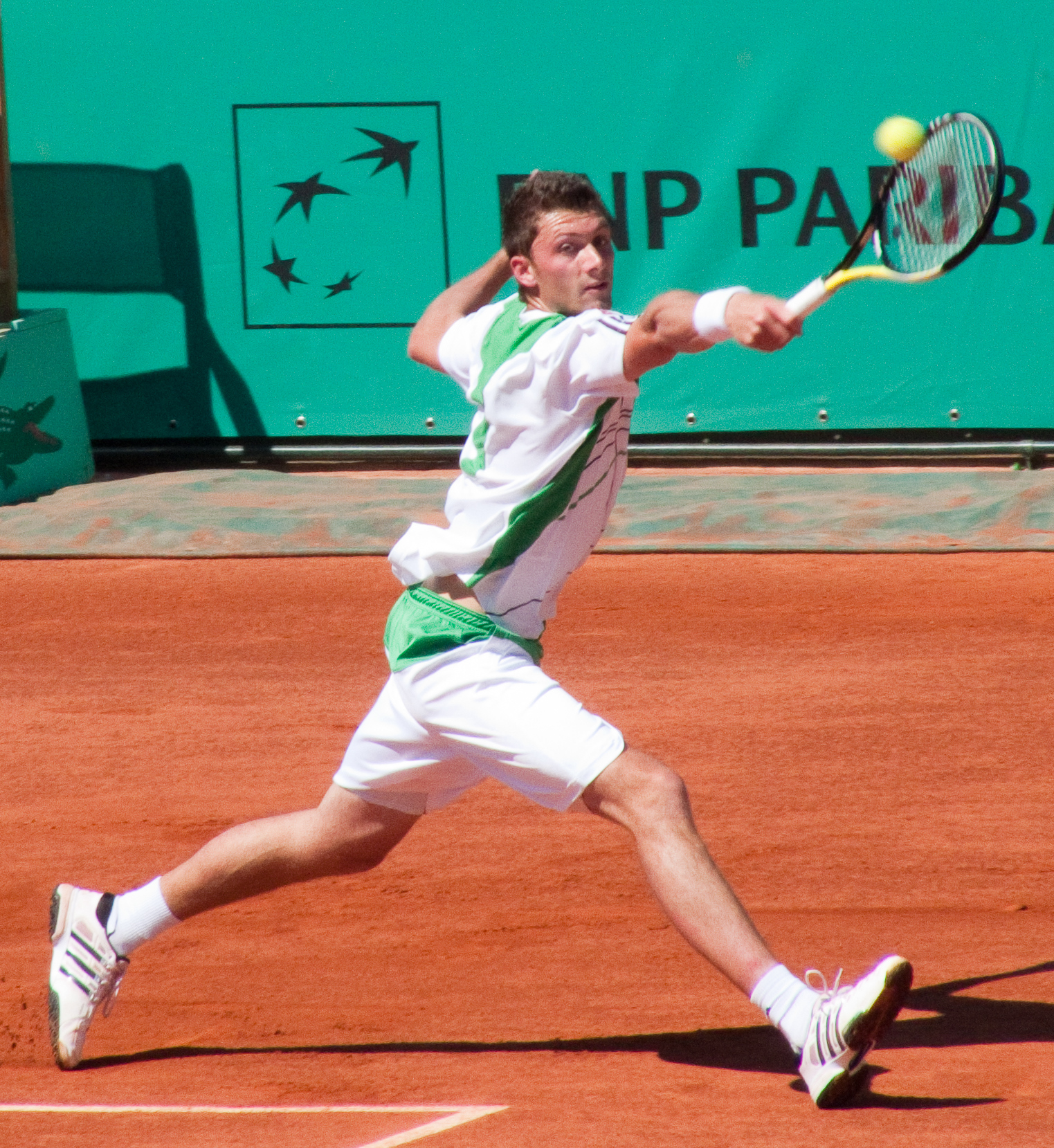
German Daniel Brands lifted the trophy in 2008

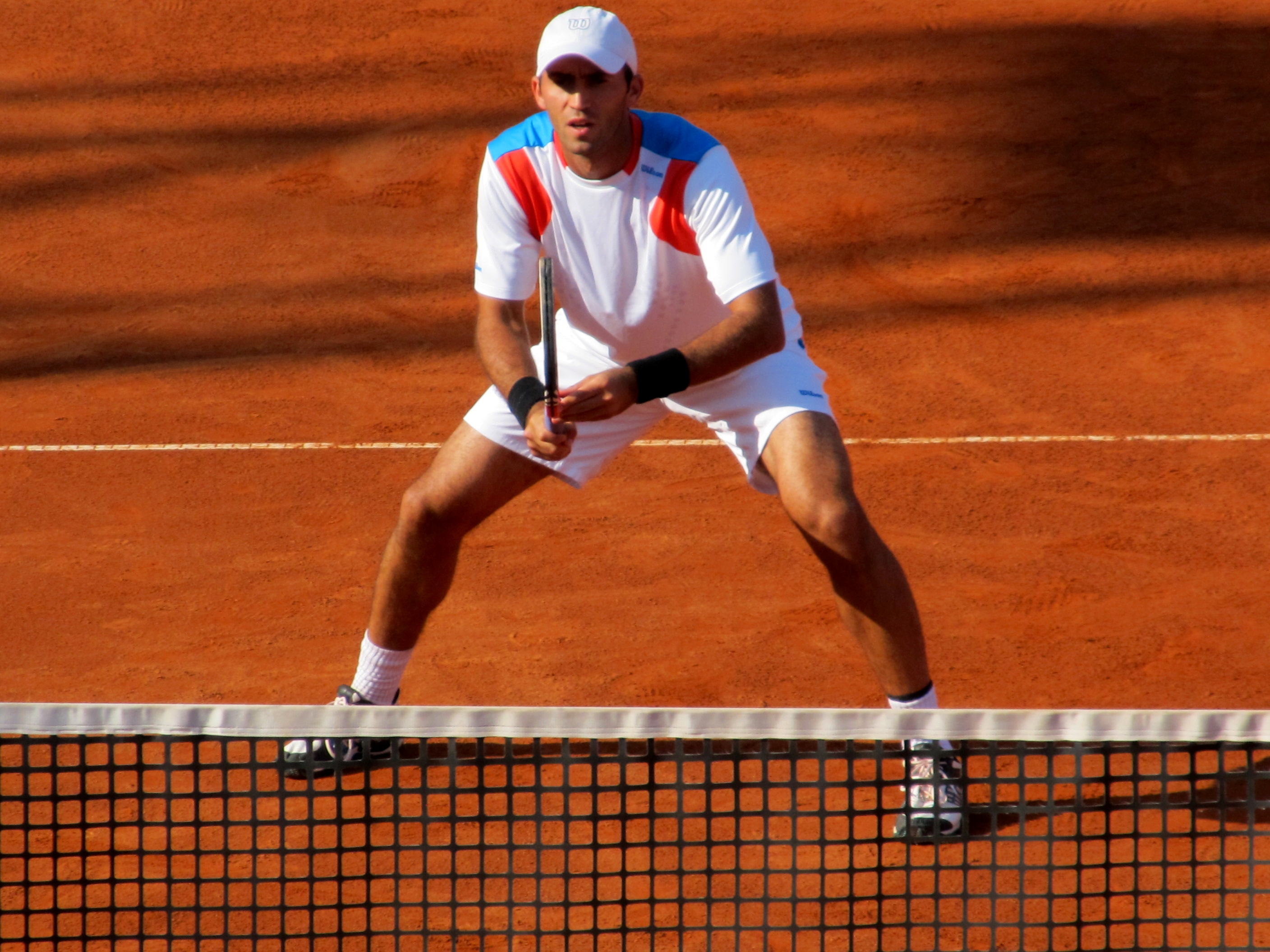
Eventual Top 10 doubles player, Romanian Horia Tecău, lifted the doubles trophy in 2004

The BRD Timișoara Challenger was a tennis tournament held in Timișoara, Romania from 2004 until 2013. The event was part of the ATP Challenger Tour and was played on outdoor clay courts. In early 2012 it was announced that BRD – Groupe Société Générale will sponsor the tournament and thus it was renamed to include the name of the sponsor. In 2013 it was cancelled due to financial reasons.

== Past finals ==
=== Singles ===
Year	Champion	Runner-up	Score
2004	(France) Marc Gicquel	(Austria) Oliver Marach	6–3, 6–1
2005	(France) Jean-Christophe Faurel	(Germany) Jakub Záhlava	6–3, 7–5
2006	(France) Nicolas Devilder	(Spain) Pablo Santos-Gonzalez	7–6, 6–2
2007	(Romania) Victor Hănescu	(Spain) Santiago Ventura	7–6, 6–3
2008	(Germany) Daniel Brands	(Spain) Daniel Muñoz-de la Nava	6–4, 7–6
2009	Not Held		
2010	Not Held		
2011	Not Held		
2012	(Romania) Victor Hănescu	(France) Guillaume Rufin	6–0, 6–3
2013	(Austria) Andreas Haider-Maurer	(Spain) Rubén Ramírez Hidalgo	6–4, 3–6, 6-4

=== Doubles ===
Year	Champion	Runner-up	Score
2004	(Romania) Florin Mergea (Romania) Horia Tecău	(Romania) Marius Călugăru (Romania) Ciprian Petre Porumb	6–3, 6–3
2005	(Romania) Ionuț Moldovan (Romania) Gabriel Moraru	(Bulgaria) Ilia Kushev (Bulgaria) Radoslav Lukaev	6–2, 6–0
2006	(Romania) Victor Crivoi (Romania) Victor Ioniță	(Sweden) Ervin Eleskovic (Sweden) Michael Ryderstedt	6–3, 6–4
2007	(Spain) Marcel Granollers (Spain) Santiago Ventura	(North Macedonia) Lazar Magdinčev (North Macedonia) Predrag Rusevski	6–1, 6–4
2008	(Spain) Daniel Muñoz-de la Nava (Spain) Rubén Ramírez Hidalgo	(Romania) Adrian Cruciat (Romania) Florin Mergea	3–6, 6–4, [11–9]
2009	Not Held		
2010	Not Held		
2011	Not Held		
2012	(Montenegro) Goran Tošić (United States) Denis Zivkovic	(Romania) Andrei Dăescu (Romania) Florin Mergea	6–2, 7–5
