= Thomas Schoorel =

Dutch tennis player (born 1989)

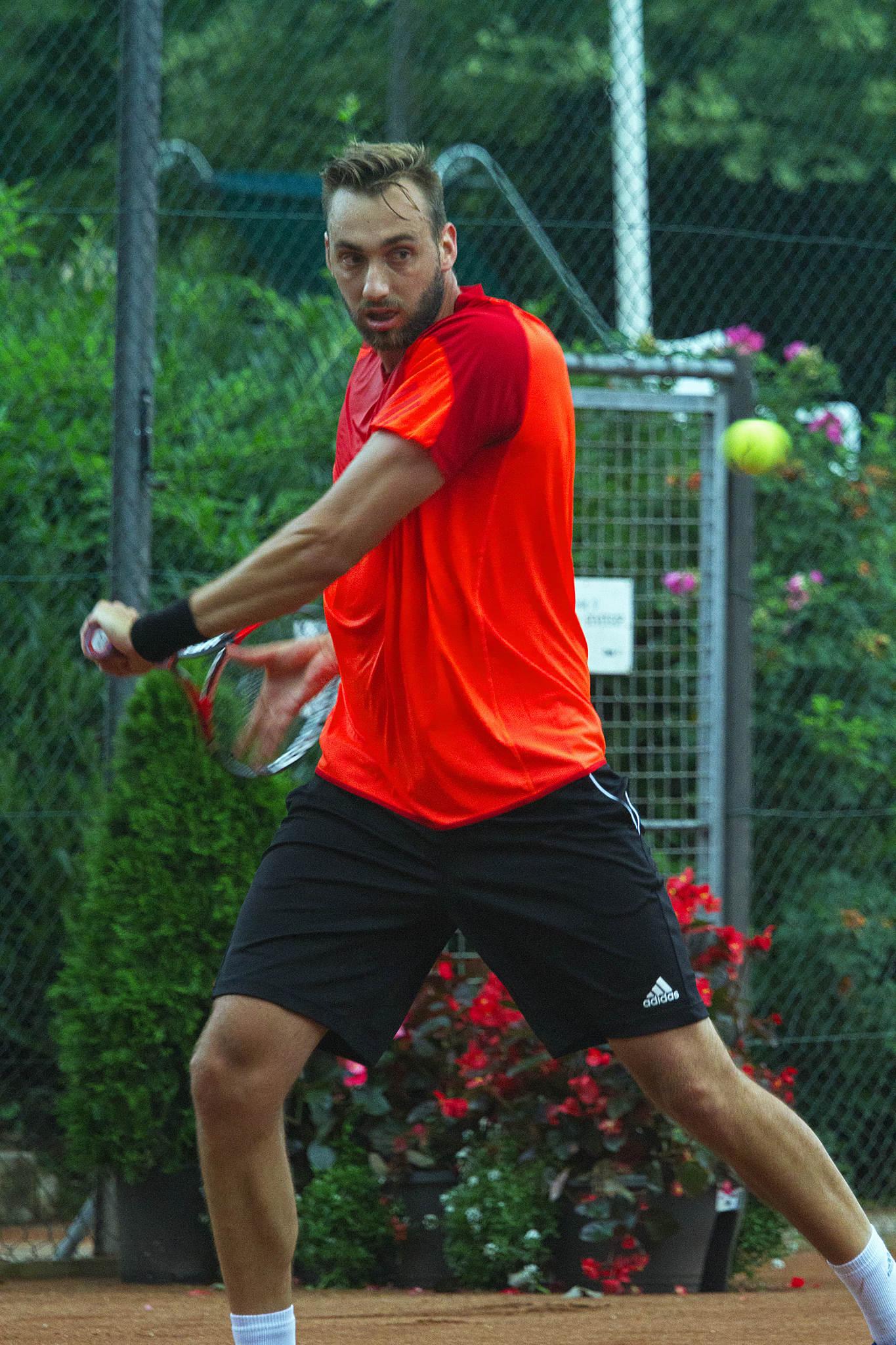
- Schoorel at an ITF tournament in The Netherlands
- Country (sports): Netherlands
- Residence: Amsterdam, Netherlands
- Born: 8 April 1989 (age 36) Amsterdam, Netherlands
- Height: 2.03 m (6 ft 8 in)
- Turned pro: 2007
- Retired: 2015
- Plays: Left-handed (one-handed backhand)
- Prize money: US$267,992

Singles
- Career record: 3–6
- Career titles: 0
- Highest ranking: No. 94 (4 July 2011)

Grand Slam singles results
- Australian Open: Q3 (2011)
- French Open: 2R (2011)
- Wimbledon: Q2 (2011)
- US Open: Q1 (2011, 2012)

Doubles
- Career record: 1–2
- Career titles: 0
- Highest ranking: No. 299 (30 August 2010)

Grand Slam doubles results
- Wimbledon: Q1 (2011)
- Last updated on: May 22, 2021.

Thomas Schoorel (born 8 April 1989) is a retired Dutch tennis player.

Schoorel has a career high ATP singles ranking of World No. 94, achieved on 4 July 2011. He also has a career high ATP doubles ranking of World No. 299, achieved on 30 August 2010.

== Career ==
Schoorel made his ATP Tour singles main draw debut at the 2010 If Stockholm Open on hard courts in Sweden. Having to earn his spot in the main draw by advancing through three qualifying rounds, Thomas proceeded to beat Patrik Rosenholm 6–4, 6–4, followed by Erling Tveit 6–7^{(2–7)}, 6–4, 6–4 and finally Marcel Granollers 6–4, 7–5 to secure a main draw birth. In the first round, he would go on to be defeated by German Benjamin Becker in straight sets 3–6, 0–6. He made his ATP Tour doubles main draw debut at the 2008 Dutch Open in Amersfoort, Netherlands when he was gifted entry as an alternate pair alongside compatriot Huib Troost. They were defeated in the first round by Russian duo Teimuraz Gabashvili and Denis Matsukevitch in straight sets 2–6, 4–6.

Schoorel won the Dutch Tennis Masters in December 2010, beating Thiemo de Bakker in the final. His two ATP Challenger singles titles both came in April 2011 back to back on clay courts in Italy. First he defeated Martin Klizan of Slovakia 7–5, 1–6, 6–3 to capture the Rome Challenger title, and then he defeated Filippo Volandri of Italy 6–2, 7–6^{(7–4)} to claim the Naples Challenger championship.

Schoorel has reached 19 career singles finals, with a record of 10 wins and 9 losses which includes a 2–4 record in ATP Challenger Tour finals. Additionally, he has reached 8 career doubles finals with a record of 4 wins and 4 losses which includes a 1–1 record in ATP Challenger tour finals. He represents his native country Netherlands when competing in the Davis Cup, where he has a record of 2 wins and 1 loss in singles play.

Schoorel is also student at the Johan Cruyff College.

== ATP Challenger and ITF Futures finals ==
=== Singles: 19 (10–9) ===
Legend ATP Challenger (2–4) ITF Futures (8–5)	Finals by surface Hard (0–3) Clay (9–5) Grass (0–0) Carpet (1–1)

Result	W–L	Date	Tournament	Tier	Surface	Opponent	Score
Win	1–0	Jun 2009	Netherlands F1, Apeldoorn	Futures	Clay	(France) Vincent Millot	7–5, 4–6, 7–5
Win	2–0	Jul 2009	Germany F10, Aschaffenburg	Futures	Clay	(Croatia) Kristijan Mesaros	6–2, 6–0
Loss	2–1	Sep 2009	Spain F32, Madrid	Futures	Hard	(Spain) Roberto Bautista Agut	4–6, 3–6
Loss	2–2	Feb 2010	Germany F4, Nussloch	Futures	Carpet	(Belgium) Niels Desein	7–6^{(7–2)}, 6–7^{(3–7)}, 6–7^{(6–8)}
Loss	2–3	Mar 2010	Portugal F3, Albufeira	Futures	Hard	(France) Benoit Paire	6–7^{(5–7)}, 4–6
Win	3–3	Apr 2010	Italy F4, Vercelli	Futures	Clay	(Austria) Martin Fischer	6–4, 6–3
Win	4–3	Jun 2010	Netherlands F3, Rotterdam	Futures	Clay	(Austria) Johannes Ager	6–3, 4–6, 6–4
Win	5–3	Jul 2010	Netherlands F4, Breda	Futures	Clay	(Netherlands) Jesse Huta Galung	6–2, 7–6^{(7–5)}
Loss	5–4	Jul 2010	Scheveningen, Netherlands	Challenger	Clay	(Germany) Denis Gremelmayr	5–7, 4–6
Loss	5–5	Sep 2010	Alphen, Netherlands	Challenger	Clay	(Netherlands) Jesse Huta Galung	7–6^{(7–4)}, 4–6, 4–6
Win	6–5	Apr 2011	Rome, Italy	Challenger	Clay	(Slovakia) Martin Kližan	7–5, 1–6, 6–3
Win	7–5	Apr 2011	Napoli, Italy	Challenger	Clay	(Italy) Filippo Volandri	6–2, 7–6^{(7–4)}
Loss	7–6	Jul 2011	Dortmund, Germany	Challenger	Clay	(Argentina) Leonardo Mayer	3–6, 2–6
Win	8–6	Jun 2013	Netherlands F3, Breda	Futures	Clay	(Netherlands) Matwe Middelkoop	6–4, 6–4
Win	9–6	Jul 2013	Netherlands F4, Middelburg	Futures	Clay	(Belgium) Niels Desein	6–3, 6–4
Loss	9–7	Aug 2013	Netherlands F5, Enschede	Futures	Clay	(Belgium) Steve Darcis	6–7^{(2–7)}, 1–6
Loss	9–8	Sep 2013	Alphen, Netherlands	Challenger	Clay	(Spain) Daniel Gimeno-Traver	2–6, 4–6
Win	10–8	Feb 2014	Germany F4, Nussloch	Futures	Carpet	(Czech Republic) Jan Mertl	6–4, 6–7^{(5–7)}, 6–4
Loss	10–9	Mar 2014	Great Britain F7, Preston	Futures	Hard	(Netherlands) Antal Van Der Duim	6–7^{(1–7)}, 2–6

=== Doubles: 8 (4–4) ===
Legend ATP Challenger (1–1) ITF Futures (3–3)	Finals by surface Hard (1–1) Clay (3–2) Grass (0–0) Carpet (0–1)

Result	W–L	Date	Tournament	Tier	Surface	Partner	Opponents	Score
Loss	0–1	Jun 2008	Netherlands F1, Apeldoorn	Futures	Clay	(Netherlands) Roy Bruggeling	(Netherlands) Stephan Fransen (Netherlands) Romano Frantzen	6–7^{(3–7)}, 6–4, [7–10]
Loss	0–2	Apr 2009	Turkey F5, Antalya	Futures	Hard	(Netherlands) Antal Van Der Duim	(Austria) Martin Pedersen (Germany) Sebastian Rieschick	5–7, 3–6
Loss	0–3	Jul 2009	Scheveningen, Netherlands	Challenger	Clay	(Netherlands) Nick van der Meer	(Argentina) Lucas Arnold Ker (Argentina) Maximo Gonzalez	5–7, 2–6
Win	1–3	Sep 2009	Spain F32, Madrid	Futures	Hard	(Netherlands) Romano Frantzen	(Spain) David Canudas-Fernandez (Togo) Komlavi Loglo	6–4, 6–4
Win	2–3	Jul 2010	Netherlands F4, Breda	Futures	Clay	(Netherlands) Matwe Middelkoop	(Ukraine) Aleksandr Agafonov (Uruguay) Marcel Felder	4–6, 6–3, [10–6]
Win	3–3	Aug 2010	Manerbio, Italy	Challenger	Clay	(Netherlands) Robin Haase	(Spain) Gabriel Trujillo-Soler (Argentina) Diego Junqueira	6–4, 6–4
Win	4–3	Jul 2013	Netherlands F4, Middelburg	Futures	Clay	(Netherlands) Romano Frantzen	(Netherlands) Wesley Koolhof (Netherlands) Stephan Fransen	6–4, 1–6, [10–8]
Loss	4–4	Feb 2014	Germany F4, Nussloch	Futures	Carpet	(Netherlands) Romano Frantzen	(Czech Republic) Roman Jebavy (Czech Republic) Marek Michalicka	6–7^{(6–8)}, 5–7
