= Simon Greul =

German tennis player (born 1981)

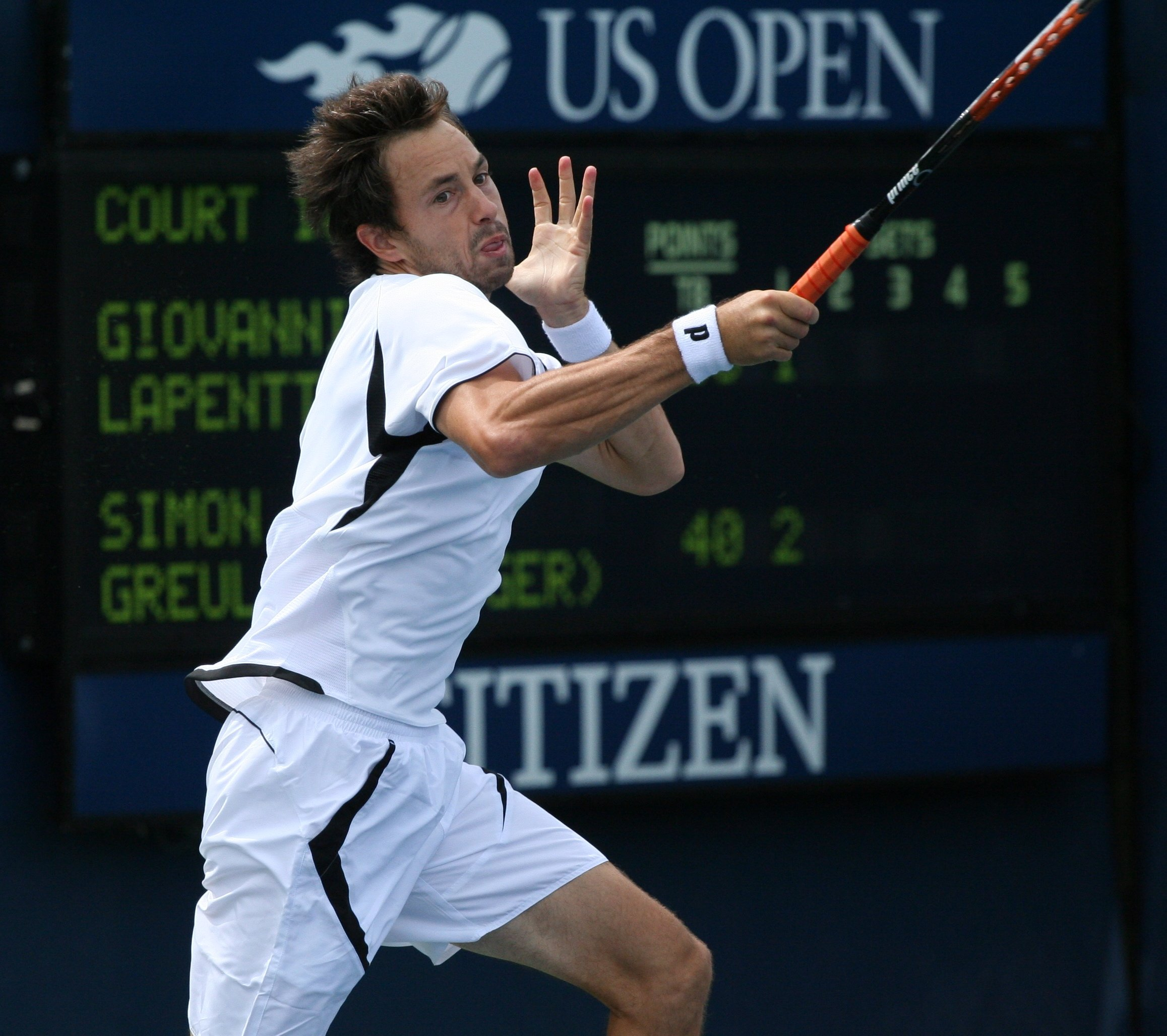
- Country (sports): Germany
- Residence: Stuttgart, Germany
- Born: 13 April 1981 (age 45) Stuttgart, West Germany
- Height: 1.85 m (6 ft 1 in)
- Turned pro: 2000
- Retired: 2013
- Plays: Right-handed (two-handed backhand)
- Prize money: US $1,320,952

Singles
- Career record: 44–72
- Career titles: 0
- Highest ranking: No. 55 (22 March 2010)

Grand Slam singles results
- Australian Open: 1R (2007, 2010, 2011)
- French Open: 1R (2008, 2009, 2010)
- Wimbledon: 2R (2009)
- US Open: 2R (2009)

Doubles
- Career record: 9–23
- Career titles: 0
- Highest ranking: No. 121 (12 April 2010)

Grand Slam doubles results
- Australian Open: 1R (2007, 2010)
- French Open: 2R (2010)
- Wimbledon: 1R (2010)
- US Open: 1R (2009, 2010)

Simon Greul (German pronunciation: [ziːmɔn ˈɡʁɔʏ̯l]; born 13 April 1981) is a German former male tennis player. He has a career-high ATP singles ranking of No. 55 achieved on 22 March 2010 and a doubles ranking of No. 121 achieved on 12 April 2010.

== Career ==
His major breakthrough was at the 2006 Nasdaq-100 Open, where after beating Adrián García and Ricardo Mello in the qualifying rounds, he reached the round of 16 at the main draw, defeating Paradorn Srichaphan, Dominik Hrbatý, and Tim Henman before succumbing to fourth seed Andy Roddick 6–3, 3–6, 6–2.

In 2009 he reached the quarterfinal at the German Open in Hamburg. He lost to Spaniard David Ferrer. At the 2009 US Open he defeated Giovanni Lapentti in the first round but lost to eventual finalist Roger Federer in the second round. In his next tournament, the BCR Romania Open in Bucharest he reached the semifinal where he lost to Juan Mónaco. Greul finished the season ranked No.59. The year was highlighted by a win at an ATP Challenger Tour Event in Todi, a semifinal appearance in Trani and Genoa. It was the best season in his career earning $305,269 and a match record of 15–15 in ATP World Tour level.

In March 2010 Greul was nominated for the Davis Cup first round match against France. Greul defeated Jo-Wilfried Tsonga in a dead rubber. That was Germany's only win in this tie. Greul reached his career high ranking of #55 after advancing to the third round of the 2010 BNP Paribas Open in Indian Wells after beating Richard Gasquet and Gaël Monfils. This was followed by a first round exit at the 2010 Sony Ericsson Open in Miami. At the 2010 BMW Open in Munich he was defeated by Marin Čilić in the second round after leading 4:1 in the deciding set. He reached the quarterfinal at the 2010 Ordina Open in s´Hertogenbosch and at the Mercedes Cup in Stuttgart. He could not defend the quarterfinal points in Hamburg of the season before which meant a drop in the ranking. At the BCR Romania Open he was knocked out in the second round by Juan Ignacio Chela.

=== Doubles: 1 (1 runner-up) ===
| Legend Grand Slam tournaments (0–0) ATP World Tour Finals (0–0) ATP World Tour Masters 1000 (0–0) ATP World Tour 500 Series (0–0) ATP World Tour 250 Series (0–1) | Finals by surface Hard (0–0) Clay (0–1) Grass (0–0) | Finals by setting Outdoor (0–1) Indoor (0–0) |

| Result | W–L | Date | Tournament | Tier | Surface | Partner | Opponents | Score |
|---|---|---|---|---|---|---|---|---|
| Loss | 0–1 | May 2010 | Buenos Aires, Argentina | 250 Series | Clay | (Australia) Peter Luczak | (Argentina) Sebastián Prieto (Argentina) Horacio Zeballos | 6–7^{(4–7)}, 3–6 |

== ATP Challenger and ITF Futures finals ==
=== Singles: 30 (20–10) ===
| Legend ATP Challenger (13–9) ITF Futures (7–1) | Finals by surface Hard (5–3) Clay (13–7) Grass (0–0) Carpet (2–0) |

| Result | W–L | Date | Tournament | Tier | Surface | Opponent | Score |
|---|---|---|---|---|---|---|---|
| Win | 1–0 | Aug 2000 | Germany F10, Berlin | Futures | Clay | (Sweden) Johan Settergren | 7–6^{(10–8)}, 6–3 |
| Win | 2–0 | Sep 2001 | Aschaffenburg, Germany | Challenger | Clay | (Netherlands) Martin Verkerk | 7–6^{(7–5)}, 6–2 |
| Win | 3–0 | Jun 2002 | Finland F1, Savitaipale | Futures | Clay | (Spain) Francisco Fogues-Domenech | 7–6^{(7–4)}, 6–2 |
| Loss | 3–1 | Sep 2002 | Donetsk, Ukraine | Challenger | Clay | (Argentina) Federico Browne | 2–6, 1–6 |
| Win | 4–1 | Feb 2003 | Dallas, United States | Challenger | Hard | (United States) Justin Gimelstob | 6–3, 7–6 |
| Loss | 4–2 | Feb 2004 | Canada F1, Calgary | Futures | Hard | (Sweden) Jacob Adaktusson | 4–6, 4–6 |
| Win | 5–2 | Jan 2005 | India F1, Mumbai | Futures | Hard | (United Kingdom) David Sherwood | 4–6, 6–3, 6–2 |
| Win | 6–2 | Jan 2005 | India F2, Delhi | Futures | Hard | (India) Sunil-Kumar Sipaeya | 6–2, 6–2 |
| Win | 7–2 | Apr 2005 | India F5, Bangalore | Futures | Hard | (Croatia) Ivan Cerović | 6–2, 6–4 |
| Win | 8–2 | Jul 2005 | Oberstaufen, Germany | Challenger | Clay | (Spain) Albert Portas | 7–5, 6–2 |
| Loss | 8–3 | Nov 2005 | Busan, South Korea | Challenger | Hard | (Germany) Bjorn Phau | 1–6, 2–6 |
| Loss | 8–4 | Apr 2006 | Chiasso, Switzerland | Challenger | Clay | (Austria) Werner Eschauer | 1–6, 2–6 |
| Win | 9–4 | May 2006 | Dresden, Germany | Challenger | Clay | (Serbia) Janko Tipsarević | 7–6, 6–2 |
| Win | 10–4 | May 2006 | Ettlingen, Germany | Challenger | Clay | (Germany) Michael Berrer | 6–4, 6–3 |
| Win | 11–4 | Jul 2006 | Córdoba, Spain | Challenger | Hard | (United States) Kevin Kim | 6–7, 6–1, 7–6 |
| Win | 12–4 | Jun 2007 | Almaty, Kazakhstan | Challenger | Clay | (Germany) Daniel Brands | 6–4, 6–2 |
| Win | 13–4 | Jul 2007 | Almaty, Kazakhstan | Challenger | Clay | (South Korea) Woong-Sun Jun | 6–3, 6–2 |
| Win | 14–4 | Feb 2008 | Germany F4, Mettmann | Futures | Carpet | (Germany) Andreas Beck | 6–2, 3–6, 6–2 |
| Win | 15–4 | Feb 2008 | Germany F5, Schwieberdingen | Futures | Carpet | (Belgium) Jeroen Masson | 6–4, 6–4 |
| Win | 16–4 | Aug 2008 | Freudenstadt, Germany | Challenger | Clay | (Germany) Matthias Bachinger | 6–3, 6–4 |
| Win | 17–4 | Sep 2008 | Alphen aan den Rijn, Netherlands | Challenger | Clay | (Spain) Iván Navarro | 6–4, 6–3 |
| Loss | 17–5 | Oct 2008 | Tarragona, Spain | Challenger | Clay | (Spain) Alberto Martín | 7–6^{(7–5)}, 4–6, 4–6 |
| Loss | 17–6 | Apr 2009 | Rome, Italy | Challenger | Clay | (Argentina) Sebastián Decoud | 6–7^{(2–7)}, 1–6 |
| Win | 18–6 | Sep 2009 | Todi, Italy | Challenger | Clay | (Romania) Adrian Ungur | 2–6, 6–1, 7–6^{(8–6)} |
| Win | 19–6 | Jun 2011 | Košice, Slovakia | Challenger | Clay | (Romania) Victor Crivoi | 6–2, 6–1 |
| Loss | 19–7 | Jun 2012 | Košice, Slovakia | Challenger | Clay | (Slovenia) Aljaž Bedene | 6–7^{(1–7)}, 2–6 |
| Loss | 19–8 | Sep 2012 | Alphen aan den Rijn, Netherlands | Challenger | Clay | (Netherlands) Thiemo de Bakker | 4–6, 2–6 |
| Win | 20–8 | Oct 2012 | Porto Alegre, Brazil | Challenger | Clay | (Portugal) Gastão Elias | 2–6, 7–6^{(7–5)}, 7–5 |
| Loss | 20–9 | Apr 2013 | Mersin, Turkey | Challenger | Clay | (Czech Republic) Jiří Veselý | 1–6, 1–6 |
| Loss | 20–10 | Nov 2013 | Ortisei, Italy | Challenger | Hard | (Italy) Andreas Seppi | 6–7^{(4–7)}, 2–6 |

=== Doubles: 15 (5–10) ===
| Legend ATP Challenger (4–10) ITF Futures (1–0) | Finals by surface Hard (0–1) Clay (5–9) Grass (0–0) Carpet (0–0) |

| Result | W–L | Date | Tournament | Tier | Surface | Partner | Opponents | Score |
|---|---|---|---|---|---|---|---|---|
| Win | 1–0 | Jun 2002 | Finland F1, Savitaipale | Futures | Clay | (Russia) Dmitry Vlasov | (Finland) Tapio Nurminen (Finland) Janne Ojala | 3–6, 6–1, 6–3 |
| Win | 2–0 | Jun 2003 | Fürth, Germany | Challenger | Clay | (Germany) Denis Gremelmayr | (Germany) Tomas Behrend (Germany) Karsten Braasch | 6–3, 1–6, 7–6^{(7–5)} |
| Loss | 2–1 | Sep 2005 | Freudenstadt, Germany | Challenger | Clay | (Germany) Sebastian Fitz | (Czech Republic) Pavel Snobel (Czech Republic) Martin Štěpánek | 2–6, 4–6 |
| Loss | 2–2 | Feb 2006 | Joplin, United States | Challenger | Hard | (Germany) Benjamin Becker | (United States) Lesley Joseph (Ghana) Henry Adjei-Darko | 3–6, 6–7^{(3–7)} |
| Loss | 2–3 | Jun 2006 | Ettlingen, Germany | Challenger | Clay | (Germany) Lars Burgsmüller | (Chile) Felipe Parada (Greece) Vasilis Mazarakis | 6–3, 1–6, [4–10] |
| Loss | 2–4 | Sep 2006 | Düsseldorf, Germany | Challenger | Clay | (Russia) Evgeny Korolev | (United States) Hugo Armando (Germany) Tomas Behrend | 1–6, 6–4, [4–10] |
| Loss | 2–5 | Apr 2008 | Monza, Italy | Challenger | Clay | (Germany) Denis Gremelmayr | (Italy) Stefano Galvani (Spain) Alberto Martin | 5–7, 6–2, [3–10] |
| Win | 3–5 | Apr 2009 | Rome 3, Italy | Challenger | Clay | (Italy) Alessandro Motti | (Italy) Filippo Volandri (Italy) Daniele Bracciali | 6–4, 7–5 |
| Win | 4–5 | Apr 2009 | Rome 1, Italy | Challenger | Clay | (Germany) Christopher Kas | (Sweden) Johan Brunström (Netherlands Antilles) Jean-Julien Rojer | 4–6, 7–6^{(7–2)}, [10–2] |
| Loss | 4–6 | Jun 2009 | Fürth, Germany | Challenger | Clay | (Italy) Alessandro Motti | (Spain) Santiago Ventura (Spain) Ruben Ramirez Hidalgo | 6–4, 1–6, [6–10] |
| Loss | 4–7 | Aug 2009 | Trani, Italy | Challenger | Clay | (Italy) Alessandro Motti | (United Kingdom) Jamie Delgado (United Kingdom) Jamie Murray | 6–3, 4–6, [10–12] |
| Win | 5–7 | Jun 2011 | Košice, Slovakia | Challenger | Clay | (Germany) Bastian Knittel | (Argentina) Facundo Bagnis (Argentina) Eduardo Schwank | 2–6, 6–3, [11–9] |
| Loss | 5–8 | Sep 2012 | Alphen, Netherlands | Challenger | Clay | (Germany) Bastian Knittel | (Australia) Rameez Junaid (Germany) Simon Stadler | 6–4, 1–6, [5–10] |
| Loss | 5–9 | Oct 2012 | Porto Alegre, Brazil | Challenger | Clay | (Italy) Alessandro Motti | (Brazil) João Souza (Brazil) Marcelo Demoliner | 3–6, 6–3, [7–10] |
| Loss | 5–10 | Sep 2013 | Alphen, Netherlands | Challenger | Clay | (Netherlands) Wesley Koolhof | (Netherlands) Boy Westerhof (Netherlands) Antal Van Der Duim | 6–4, 3–6, [10–12] |

== Performance timelines ==
Key
| W | F | SF | QF | #R | RR | Q# | DNQ | A | NH |

(W) winner; (F) finalist; (SF) semifinalist; (QF) quarterfinalist; (#R) rounds 4, 3, 2, 1; (RR) round-robin stage; (Q#) qualification round; (DNQ) did not qualify; (A) absent; (NH) not held; (SR) strike rate (events won / competed); (W–L) win–loss record.

=== Singles ===
| Tournament | 2003 | 2004 | 2005 | 2006 | 2007 | 2008 | 2009 | 2010 | 2011 | 2012 | 2013 | SR | W–L | Win% |
|---|---|---|---|---|---|---|---|---|---|---|---|---|---|---|
Grand Slam tournaments
| Australian Open | Q3 | Q1 | A | Q1 | 1R | A | Q1 | 1R | 1R | Q1 | Q1 | 0 / 3 | 0–3 | 0% |
| French Open | A | A | Q1 | Q1 | A | 1R | 1R | 1R | Q3 | Q1 | Q3 | 0 / 3 | 0–3 | 0% |
| Wimbledon | A | A | A | 1R | A | A | 2R | 1R | Q1 | Q2 | Q1 | 0 / 3 | 1–3 | 25% |
| US Open | A | A | Q2 | 1R | A | A | 2R | 1R | A | Q2 | A | 0 / 3 | 1–3 | 25% |
| Win–loss | 0–0 | 0–0 | 0–0 | 0–2 | 0–1 | 0–1 | 2–3 | 0–4 | 0–1 | 0–0 | 0–0 | 0 / 12 | 2–12 | 14% |
ATP World Tour Masters 1000
| Indian Wells Masters | A | A | A | Q1 | 1R | A | Q1 | 3R | A | A | A | 0 / 2 | 2–2 | 50% |
| Miami Masters | A | A | A | 4R | 2R | A | Q2 | 1R | A | A | A | 0 / 3 | 4–3 | 57% |
| Monte-Carlo Masters | A | A | A | A | A | A | A | 1R | A | A | A | 0 / 1 | 0–1 | 0% |
| Hamburg Masters | A | A | A | 1R | A | A | Not Masters Series | | | | | 0 / 1 | 0–1 | 0% |
| Madrid Masters | A | A | A | A | A | A | A | 1R | A | A | A | 0 / 1 | 0–1 | 0% |
| Rome Masters | A | A | A | A | A | A | Q1 | 1R | A | A | A | 0 / 1 | 0–1 | 0% |
| Cincinnati Masters | A | A | A | A | A | A | A | Q2 | A | A | A | 0 / 0 | 0–0 | – |
| Paris Masters | A | A | A | Q1 | A | A | A | A | A | A | A | 0 / 0 | 0–0 | – |
| Win–loss | 0–0 | 0–0 | 0–0 | 3–2 | 1–2 | 0–0 | 0–0 | 2–5 | 0–0 | 0–0 | 0–0 | 0 / 9 | 6–9 | 40% |
