= Rai Open =

ATP Challenger Tour
- Location: Rome, Italy
- Venue: Circolo Sportivo Rai
- Category: ATP Challenger Tour
- Surface: Clay
- Draw: 32S/32Q/16D
- Prize money: $35,000 (€30,000+H) (2013)

The Rai Open was a professional tennis tournament played on outdoor red clay courts. It was part of the Association of Tennis Professionals (ATP) Challenger Tour. It was held annually in Rome, Italy, from 2009 until 2013 and was subsequently held as the Garden Roma Open.

== Past finals ==
=== Singles ===
Year	Champion	Runner-up	Score
2013	(Germany) Julian Reister	(Spain) Guillermo García López	4–6, 6–3, 6–2
2012	(Spain) Roberto Bautista Agut	(Portugal) Rui Machado	6–7 ^{(7–9)}, 6–4, 6–3
2011	(Netherlands) Thomas Schoorel	(Slovakia) Martin Kližan	7–5, 1–6, 6–3
2010	(Italy) Filippo Volandri	(Algeria) Lamine Ouahab	6–4, 7–5
2009	(Argentina) Sebastián Decoud	(Germany) Simon Greul	7–6(2), 6–1

=== Doubles ===
Year	Champions	Runners-up	Score
2013	(Germany) Andreas Beck (Austria) Martin Fischer	(Germany) Martin Emmrich (Australia) Rameez Junaid	7–6^{(7–2)}, 6–0
2012	(Germany) Dustin Brown (United Kingdom) Jonathan Marray	(Romania) Andrei Dăescu (Romania) Florin Mergea	6–4, 7–6^{(7–0)}
2011	(Slovakia) Martin Kližan (Italy) Alessandro Motti	(Italy) Thomas Fabbiano (Italy) Walter Trusendi	7–6(3), 6–4
2010	(Poland) Tomasz Bednarek (Poland) Mateusz Kowalczyk	(South Africa) Jeff Coetzee (United States) Jesse Witten	6–4, 7–6(4)
2009	(Germany) Simon Greul (Italy) Alessandro Motti	(Italy) Daniele Bracciali (Italy) Filippo Volandri	6–4, 7–5
