= 2013 Città di Caltanissetta – Singles =

Singles
- 2013 Città di Caltanissetta

Final
- Champion: (Serbia) Dušan Lajović
- Runner-up: (Netherlands) Robin Haase
- Score: 7–6^{(7–4)}, 6–3

Events
Singles	Doubles
← 2012 ·	Città di Caltanissetta	· 2014 →

Tommy Robredo was the defending champion, but competed in the 2013 French Open.
Dušan Lajović defeated Robin Haase 7–6^{(7–4)}, 6–3 in the final to win the title.

== Seeds ==
1. (Slovakia) Martin Kližan (first round)
2. (Netherlands) Robin Haase (final)
3. (Argentina) Leonardo Mayer (second round)
4. (Argentina) Guido Pella (first round)
5. (Netherlands) Thiemo de Bakker (quarterfinals)
6. (Argentina) Martín Alund (first round)
7. (Italy) Filippo Volandri (second round)
8. (Spain) Rubén Ramírez Hidalgo (first round)

== Draw ==
=== Key ===
- Q = Qualifier
- WC = Wild card
- LL = Lucky loser
- Alt = Alternate
- SE = Special exempt
- PR = Protected ranking
- ITF = ITF entry
- JE = Junior exempt
- w/o = Walkover
- r = Retired
- d = Defaulted
- SR = Special ranking

=== Finals ===
Semifinals
(Serbia) Dušan Lajović	6	6
(India) Somdev Devvarman	1	3
WC	(Italy) Potito Starace	6	5	3
2	(Netherlands) Robin Haase	4	7	6

Final
(Serbia) Dušan Lajović	7^{7}	6
2	(Netherlands) Robin Haase	6^{4}	3

=== Top half ===
First round
1/WC	(Slovakia) M Kližan	6^{1}	6	3
(Spain) P Carreño Busta	7^{7}	2	6
Q	(Italy) A Arnaboldi	4	1
(Germany) D Meffert	6	6
(Serbia) D Lajović	6	6^{8}	6
(Belgium) A De Greef	1	7^{10}	4
(Argentina) R Olivo	7^{7}	6
8	(Spain) R Ramírez Hidalgo	6^{5}	2
3	(Argentina) L Mayer	6	6
(Italy) M Viola	4	3
(India) S Devvarman	6	4
PR	(Argentina) E Schwank	3	1^{r}
(Argentina) F Delbonis	6	2
Alt	(Italy) A Giannessi	1	1^{r}
Q	(Austria) P Oswald	5	2
7	(Italy) F Volandri	7	6

Second round
(Spain) P Carreño Busta	5	2
(Germany) D Meffert	7	6
(Serbia) D Lajović	6	6
(Argentina) R Olivo	0	2
3	(Argentina) L Mayer	4	5
(India) S Devvarman	6	7
(Argentina) F Delbonis	6	5	6
7	(Italy) F Volandri	3	7	1

Quarterfinals
(Germany) D Meffert	3	4
(Serbia) D Lajović	6	6
(India) S Devvarman	6	6
(Argentina) F Delbonis	4	0

Semifinals
(Serbia) D Lajović	6	6
(India) S Devvarman	1	3

=== Bottom half ===
First round
5	(Netherlands) T de Bakker	3	6	6
(Italy) G Naso	6	3	1
(Italy) A di Mauro	6	6
(Chile) J Aguilar	3	4
WC	(Italy) P Starace	6	6
(Argentina) M Trungelliti	3	2
(Argentina) A Velotti	5	6	6
4	(Argentina) G Pella	7	3	4
6	(Argentina) M Alund	5	6	3
(Spain) A Menéndez Maceiras	7	4	6
WC	(Italy) M Cecchinato	6	6
Q	(Chile) JC Sáez	3	4
WC	(Italy) S Caruso	5	6	7^{7}
Q	(Argentina) A Molteni	7	4	6^{5}
(Brazil) T Alves	1	2
2	(Netherlands) R Haase	6	6

Second round
5	(Netherlands) T de Bakker	6	6
(Italy) A di Mauro	4	4
WC	(Italy) P Starace	6	6
(Argentina) A Velotti	3	2
(Spain) A Menéndez Maceiras	1	0^{r}
WC	(Italy) M Cecchinato	6	4
WC	(Italy) S Caruso	0	1
2	(Netherlands) R Haase	6	6

Quarterfinals
5	(Netherlands) T de Bakker	2	6^{5}
WC	(Italy) P Starace	6	7^{7}
WC	(Italy) M Cecchinato	4	2
2	(Netherlands) R Haase	6	6

Semifinals
WC	(Italy) P Starace	6	5	3
2	(Netherlands) R Haase	4	7	6
