= 2011 Città di Caltanissetta – Singles =

Singles
- 2011 Città di Caltanissetta

Final
- Champion: (Austria) Andreas Haider-Maurer
- Runner-up: (Italy) Matteo Viola
- Score: 6–1, 7–6(1)

Events
| Singles | Doubles |
| ← 2010 · | Città di Caltanissetta | · 2012 → |

Robin Haase was the defending champion, but chose not to compete.
Andreas Haider-Maurer won the title, defeating Matteo Viola in the final.

== Seeds ==
1. (Italy) Filippo Volandri (second round)
2. (Germany) Denis Gremelmayr (first round)
3. (Austria) Andreas Haider-Maurer (champion)
4. (France) Benoît Paire (first round)
5. (Germany) Simon Greul (first round)
6. (Italy) Alessio di Mauro (first round)
7. (Germany) Bastian Knittel (second round)
8. (France) David Guez (first round)

== Draw ==
=== Key ===
- Q = Qualifier
- WC = Wild card
- LL = Lucky loser
- Alt = Alternate
- ITF = ITF entry
- PR = Protected ranking
- SR = Special ranking
- SE = Special exempt
- JE = Junior exempt
- JR = Junior Accelerator Programme entrant
- CO = College Accelerator Programme entrant
- NG = Next Gen Accelerator Program entrant
- w/o = Walkover
- r = Retired
- d = Defaulted

=== Final four ===
Semifinals
(Romania) Adrian Ungur | 3 | 7 | 4
3 | (Austria) Andreas Haider-Maurer | 6 | 6^{3} | 6
(Italy) Matteo Viola | 6 | 6
(Spain) Adrián Menéndez | 4 | 2

Final
3 | (Austria) Andreas Haider-Maurer | 6 | 7
(Italy) Matteo Viola | 1 | 6^{1}

=== Top half ===
First round
1 | (Italy) F Volandri | 1 | 6 | 6
(Serbia) N Ćirić | 6 | 3 | 1
(Romania) A Ungur | 6 | 6
(Spain) J Martí | 2 | 2
(Italy) Andrea Arnaboldi | 6^{9} | 4
(Netherlands) T Schoorel | 7 | 6
(Germany) Alexander Flock | 4 | 2
7 | (Germany) B Knittel | 6 | 6
3 | (Austria) A Haider-Maurer | 6 | 6
(Uzbekistan) F Dustov | 3 | 1
Q | (Netherlands) A van der Duim | 7 | 6
WC | (Italy) F Aldi | 5 | 0
Q | (Italy) Enrico Burzi | 4 | 4
(Italy) G Naso | 6 | 6
(Italy) S Vagnozzi | 6 | 6
5 | (Germany) S Greul | 2 | 1

Second round
1 | (Italy) F Volandri | 4 | 0
(Romania) A Ungur | 6 | 6
(Netherlands) T Schoorel | 6 | 6
7 | (Germany) B Knittel | 3 | 1
3 | (Austria) A Haider-Maurer | 5 | 6 | 6
Q | (Netherlands) A van der Duim | 7 | 2 | 3
(Italy) G Naso | 7 | 6
(Italy) S Vagnozzi | 5 | 4

Quarterfinals
(Romania) A Ungur | 6 | 7
(Netherlands) T Schoorel | 3 | 5
3 | (Austria) A Haider-Maurer | 6 | 6
(Italy) G Naso | 3 | 4

Semifinals
(Romania) A Ungur | 3 | 7 | 4
3 | (Austria) A Haider-Maurer | 6 | 6^{3} | 6

=== Bottom half ===
First round
6 | (Italy) A di Mauro | 6^{7} | 1
WC | (Italy) S Galvani | 7 | 6
(Spain) P Santos | 2 | 4
(France) J Eysseric | 6 | 6
(Italy) D Giorgini | 5 | 6 | 6^{3}
(Italy) M Trevisan | 7 | 2 | 7
(Italy) M Viola | 6 | 7
4 | (France) B Paire | 0 | 6^{3}
8 | (France) D Guez | 3 | 1
Q | (Slovenia) A Bedene | 6 | 6
WC | (Italy) D Bracciali | 0 | 5
(Spain) P Carreño Busta | 6 | 7
Q | (Italy) Filippo Leonardi | 4 | 6^{2}
(Italy) A Brizzi | 6 | 7
(Spain) A Menéndez | 2 | 6 | 6
2 | (Germany) D Gremelmayr | 6 | 4 | 4

Second round
WC | (Italy) S Galvani | 6 | 2
(France) J Eysseric | 4 | 0^{r}
(Italy) M Trevisan | 3 | 6 | 5
(Italy) M Viola | 6 | 4 | 7
Q | (Slovenia) A Bedene | 7 | 5 | 6
(Spain) P Carreño Busta | 6^{1} | 7 | 3
(Italy) A Brizzi | 5 | 7 | 6^{3}
(Spain) A Menéndez | 7 | 5 | 7

Quarterfinals
WC | (Italy) S Galvani | 6 | 2 | 4
(Italy) M Viola | 3 | 6 | 6
Q | (Slovenia) A Bedene | 7 | 3 | 6^{5}
(Spain) A Menéndez | 6^{4} | 6 | 7

Semifinals
(Italy) M Viola | 6 | 6
(Spain) A Menéndez | 4 | 2
