= 2015 Città di Caltanissetta – Singles =

Singles
- 2015 Città di Caltanissetta

Final
- Champion: (Sweden) Elias Ymer
- Runner-up: (United States) Bjorn Fratangelo
- Score: 6–3, 6–2

Events
Singles	Doubles
← 2014 ·	Città di Caltanissetta	· 2016 →

Pablo Carreño Busta was the defending champion, but he did not participate.

Elias Ymer won the title, defeating Bjorn Fratangelo in the final, 6–3, 6–2.

== Seeds ==
1. (Spain) Albert Ramos Viñolas (semifinals)
2. (Italy) Paolo Lorenzi (withdrew)
3. (Colombia) Alejandro González (quarterfinals)
4. (Argentina) Guido Pella (quarterfinals)
5. (Argentina) Máximo González (second round)
6. (Italy) Marco Cecchinato (semifinals)
7. (United States) Bjorn Fratangelo (final)
8. (Portugal) Gastão Elias (quarterfinals)
9. (Brazil) Guilherme Clezar (quarterfinals)

== Draw ==
=== Key ===
- Q = Qualifier
- WC = Wild card
- LL = Lucky loser
- Alt = Alternate
- SE = Special exempt
- PR = Protected ranking
- ITF = ITF entry
- JE = Junior exempt
- w/o = Walkover
- r = Retired
- d = Defaulted
- SR = Special ranking

=== Finals ===
Semifinals
1	(Spain) Albert Ramos Viñolas	6^{9}	6	4
(Sweden) Elias Ymer	7^{11}	3	6
7	(United States) Bjorn Fratangelo	4	6	6
6	(Italy) Marco Cecchinato	6	3	3

Final
(Sweden) Elias Ymer	6	6
7	(United States) Bjorn Fratangelo	3	2

=== Top half ===
First round
1	(Spain) A Ramos Viñolas	6	6
Q	(France) Q Halys	2	3
(Italy) R Marcora	1	5
(Spain) R Carballés Baena	6	7
WC	(Italy) F Gaio	7	6
(Netherlands) J Huta Galung	5	3
(Romania) V Hănescu	6	4	3
8	(Portugal) G Elias	3	6	6
4	(Argentina) G Pella	6	6
WC	(Italy) S Travaglia	4	0
(Croatia) M Delić	6^{1}	1
(Italy) A Arnaboldi	7^{7}	6
(Argentina) G Andreozzi	6^{4}	4
(Sweden) E Ymer	7^{7}	6
Q	(Colombia) N Barrientos	2	3
5	(Argentina) M González	6	6

Second round
1	(Spain) A Ramos Viñolas	6	6
(Spain) R Carballés Baena	4	0
WC	(Italy) F Gaio	1	5
8	(Portugal) G Elias	6	7
4	(Argentina) G Pella	6	7^{11}
(Italy) A Arnaboldi	2	6^{9}
(Sweden) E Ymer	7^{7}	7^{8}
5	(Argentina) M González	6^{1}	6^{6}

Quarterfinals
1	(Spain) A Ramos Viñolas	6	6
8	(Portugal) G Elias	1	2
4	(Argentina) G Pella	3	6	5
(Sweden) E Ymer	6	3	7

Semifinals
1	(Spain) A Ramos Viñolas	6^{9}	6	4
(Sweden) E Ymer	7^{11}	3	6

=== Bottom half ===
First round
7	(United States) B Fratangelo	7^{8}	7^{7}
(Chile) C Garin	6^{6}	6^{4}
(United States) D Novikov	4	7	7
WC	(Italy) S Caruso	6	5	5
LL	(Peru) D Beretta	6	4	6
Q	(Argentina) JI Londero	4	6	3
(Belgium) Y Mertens	2	3
3	(Colombia) A González	6	6
6	(Italy) M Cecchinato	6	7
(Chinese Taipei) T-h Yang	3	5
(Dominican Republic) J Hernández	4	6	3
WC	(Italy) G Quinzi	6	3	6
(France) M Hamou	4	6	4
(Romania) A Ungur	6	3	6
Q	(Chile) G Lama	7^{7}	2	2
9	(Brazil) G Clezar	6^{5}	6	6

Second round
7	(United States) B Fratangelo	3	6	6
(United States) D Novikov	6	3	2
LL	(Peru) D Beretta	6	3	1
3	(Colombia) A González	3	6	6
6	(Italy) M Cecchinato	6	6
WC	(Italy) G Quinzi	4	3
(Romania) A Ungur	4	6^{6}
9	(Brazil) G Clezar	6	7^{8}

Quarterfinals
7	(United States) B Fratangelo	3	7	6
3	(Colombia) A González	6	5	1
6	(Italy) M Cecchinato	6	6
9	(Brazil) G Clezar	0	0

Semifinals
7	(United States) B Fratangelo	4	6	6
6	(Italy) M Cecchinato	6	3	3
