= 2016 Città di Caltanissetta – Doubles =

Doubles
- 2016 Città di Caltanissetta

Final
- Champions: (Argentina) Guido Andreozzi (Argentina) Andrés Molteni
- Runners-up: (El Salvador) Marcelo Arévalo (Mexico) Miguel Ángel Reyes-Varela
- Score: 6–1, 6–2

Events
Singles	Doubles
← 2015 ·	Città di Caltanissetta	· 2017 →

Daniele Bracciali and Potito Starace were the defending champions, but could not defend their title due to being banned from tennis for betting offences.

Guido Andreozzi and Andrés Molteni won the title after defeating Marcelo Arévalo and Miguel Ángel Reyes-Varela 6–1, 6–2 in the final.

== Seeds ==
1. (China) Bai Yan / (Italy) Riccardo Ghedin (quarterfinals)
2. (United States) James Cerretani / (United States) Max Schnur (semifinals)
3. (El Salvador) Marcelo Arévalo / (Mexico) Miguel Ángel Reyes-Varela (final)
4. (Argentina) Guido Andreozzi / (Argentina) Andrés Molteni (champions)

== Draw ==
=== Key ===
- Q = Qualifier
- WC = Wild card
- LL = Lucky loser
- Alt = Alternate
- SE = Special exempt
- PR = Protected ranking
- ITF = ITF entry
- JE = Junior exempt
- w/o = Walkover
- r = Retired
- d = Defaulted
- SR = Special ranking

First round
1	(China) Y Bai (Italy) R Ghedin	2	6	[10]
WC	(Italy) S Caruso (Italy) Omar Giacalone	6	4	[7]
(Peru) S Galdós (Chile) G Lama	7^{7}	7
(Serbia) P Krstin (Serbia) M Tepavac	6^{1}	5
4	(Argentina) G Andreozzi (Argentina) A Molteni	7	6
WC	(Italy) M Donati (Chile) N Jarry	5	4
(Serbia) L Đere (Portugal) FF Silva	7^{7}	6
WC	(Italy) Antonio Massara (Italy) Ettore Zito	6^{5}	1
(Italy) A Motti (Romania) A Ungur	6^{6}	0
(Brazil) G Clezar (Spain) D Gimeno-Traver	7^{8}	6
(Colombia) A González (Brazil) C Zampieri	4	6^{6}
3	(El Salvador) M Arévalo (Mexico) MA Reyes-Varela	6	7^{8}
(Italy) A Arnaboldi (Italy) A Giannessi	6	7^{10}
(Spain) E López-Pérez (Netherlands) M Vervoort	3	6^{8}
(Germany) K Krawietz (Croatia) D Marcan	0	7	[9]
2	(United States) J Cerretani (United States) M Schnur	6	5	[11]

Quarterfinals
1	(China) Y Bai (Italy) R Ghedin	6^{3}	6^{5}
(Peru) S Galdós (Chile) G Lama	7^{7}	7^{7}
4	(Argentina) G Andreozzi (Argentina) A Molteni	6	6
(Serbia) L Đere (Portugal) FF Silva	1	2
(Brazil) G Clezar (Spain) D Gimeno-Traver	2	2
3	(El Salvador) M Arévalo (Mexico) MA Reyes-Varela	6	6
(Italy) A Arnaboldi (Italy) A Giannessi	5	5
2	(United States) J Cerretani (United States) M Schnur	7	7

Semifinals
(Peru) S Galdós (Chile) G Lama	6	2	[8]
4	(Argentina) G Andreozzi (Argentina) A Molteni	4	6	[10]
3	(El Salvador) M Arévalo (Mexico) MA Reyes-Varela	6^{8}	6	[10]
2	(United States) J Cerretani (United States) M Schnur	7^{10}	3	[6]

Final
4	(Argentina) G Andreozzi (Argentina) A Molteni	6	6
3	(El Salvador) M Arévalo (Mexico) MA Reyes-Varela	1	2
