= 2017 Città di Caltanissetta – Doubles =

Doubles
- 2017 Città di Caltanissetta

Final
- Champions: (United States) James Cerretani (United States) Max Schnur
- Runners-up: (Ukraine) Denys Molchanov (Croatia) Franko Škugor
- Score: 6–3, 3–6, [10–6]

Events
Singles	Doubles
← 2016 ·	Città di Caltanissetta	· 2018 →

Guido Andreozzi and Andrés Molteni were the defending champions but only Andreozzi chose to defend his title, partnering Sergio Galdós. Andreozzi lost in the first round to Alessandro Giannessi and Gianluca Mager.

James Cerretani and Max Schnur won the title after defeating Denys Molchanov and Franko Škugor 6–3, 3–6, [10–6] in the final.

== Seeds ==
1. (Chile) Hans Podlipnik-Castillo / (Belarus) Andrei Vasilevski (quarterfinals)
2. (United States) James Cerretani / (United States) Max Schnur (champions)
3. (Uruguay) Ariel Behar / (Belarus) Aliaksandr Bury (quarterfinals)
4. (Croatia) Dino Marcan / (Austria) Tristan-Samuel Weissborn (quarterfinals)

== Draw ==
=== Key ===
- Q = Qualifier
- WC = Wild card
- LL = Lucky loser
- Alt = Alternate
- SE = Special exempt
- PR = Protected ranking
- ITF = ITF entry
- JE = Junior exempt
- w/o = Walkover
- r = Retired
- d = Defaulted
- SR = Special ranking

First round
1	(Chile) H Podlipnik-Castillo (Belarus) A Vasilevski	7	6
(Australia) Jarryd Chaplin (United States) T Sandgren	5	2
(Croatia) M Draganja (Croatia) T Draganja	7^{8}	3	[9]
(Argentina) F Bagnis (Italy) M Cecchinato	6^{6}	6	[11]
3	(Uruguay) A Behar (Belarus) A Bury	6	6
(El Salvador) M Arévalo (Slovakia) J Kovalík	4	4
(Ukraine) D Molchanov (Croatia) F Škugor	6	6
WC	(Italy) A Arnaboldi (Italy) S Caruso	0	4
(Argentina) F Delbonis (Argentina) G Durán	6	6
(Serbia) L Đere (Serbia) M Zekić	3	1
WC	(Italy) M Berrettini (Italy) F Gaio	7^{9}	6^{5}	[4]^{r}
4	(Croatia) D Marcan (Austria) T-S Weissborn	6^{7}	7^{7}	[3]
WC	(Italy) A Giannessi (Italy) G Mager	6	6
(Argentina) G Andreozzi (Peru) S Galdós	3	2
(Italy) A Motti (Italy) S Travaglia	6^{3}	3
2	(United States) J Cerretani (United States) M Schnur	7^{7}	6

Quarterfinals
1	(Chile) H Podlipnik-Castillo (Belarus) A Vasilevski	2	6	[11]
(Argentina) F Bagnis (Italy) M Cecchinato	6	2	[13]
3	(Uruguay) A Behar (Belarus) A Bury	6	1	[9]
(Ukraine) D Molchanov (Croatia) F Škugor	4	6	[11]
(Argentina) F Delbonis (Argentina) G Durán	6	7^{7}
4	(Croatia) D Marcan (Austria) T-S Weissborn	0	6^{3}
WC	(Italy) A Giannessi (Italy) G Mager	4	2
2	(United States) J Cerretani (United States) M Schnur	6	6

Semifinals
(Argentina) F Bagnis (Italy) M Cecchinato	7^{9}	3	[4]
(Ukraine) D Molchanov (Croatia) F Škugor	6^{7}	6	[10]
(Argentina) F Delbonis (Argentina) G Durán	4	6^{5}
2	(United States) J Cerretani (United States) M Schnur	6	7^{7}

Final
(Ukraine) D Molchanov (Croatia) F Škugor	3	6	[6]
2	(United States) J Cerretani (United States) M Schnur	6	3	[10]
