= 2010 Città di Caltanissetta – Doubles =

Doubles
- 2010 Città di Caltanissetta

Final
- Champions: (Spain) David Marrero (Spain) Santiago Ventura
- Runners-up: (Belarus) Uladzimir Ignatik (Slovakia) Martin Kližan
- Score: 7–6(3), 6–4

Events
Singles	Doubles
← 2009 ·	Città di Caltanissetta	· 2011 →

Juan Pablo Brzezicki and David Marrero were the defending champions, but Brzezicki chose to not participate this year.
Marrero partnered up with Santiago Ventura and they won in the final 7–6(3), 6–4, against Uladzimir Ignatik and Martin Kližan.

== Seeds ==
1. (Spain) David Marrero / (Spain) Santiago Ventura (champions)
2. (Germany) Martin Emmrich / (Sweden) Andreas Siljeström (quarterfinals)
3. (Argentina) Sebastián Decoud / (Netherlands) Jesse Huta Galung (first round)
4. (Argentina) Juan-Martín Aranguren / (Argentina) Diego Junqueira (first round)

== Draw ==
=== Key ===
- Q = Qualifier
- WC = Wild card
- LL = Lucky loser
- Alt = Alternate
- SE = Special exempt
- PR = Protected ranking
- ITF = ITF entry
- JE = Junior exempt
- w/o = Walkover
- r = Retired
- d = Defaulted
- SR = Special ranking

=== Draw ===
First round
1	(Spain) D Marrero (Spain) S Ventura	6	6
(Czech Republic) D Lojda (Croatia) A Veić	2	0
(Argentina) M Alund (Argentina) C Berlocq	6	6
WC	(Croatia) F Škugor (Croatia) I Zovko	2	4
3	(Argentina) S Decoud (Netherlands) J Huta Galung	3	4
(Italy) F Aldi (Italy) A di Mauro	6	6
WC	(Italy) M Cecchinato (Italy) F Torresi	4	3
(Spain) A Menéndez-Maceiras (Spain) A Ramos-Viñolas	6	6
(Brazil) R Dutra da Silva (Brazil) C Zampieri	1	1
(Spain) I Navarro (Spain) P Riba	6	6
WC	(Chile) A García (Spain) R Ramírez Hidalgo	6	6
4	(Argentina) J-M Aranguren (Argentina) D Junqueira	4	2
(Argentina) JP Amado (United States) J Witten	6	2	[3]
(Belarus) U Ignatik (Slovakia) M Kližan	3	6	[10]
(Monaco) B Balleret (France) J Dasnières de Veigy	1	4
2	(Germany) M Emmrich (Sweden) A Siljeström	6	6

Quarterfinals
1	(Spain) D Marrero (Spain) S Ventura	6	6
(Argentina) M Alund (Argentina) C Berlocq	1	1
(Italy) F Aldi (Italy) A di Mauro	2	2
(Spain) A Menéndez-Maceiras (Spain) A Ramos-Viñolas	6	6
(Spain) I Navarro (Spain) P Riba	6	6
WC	(Chile) A García (Spain) R Ramírez Hidalgo	2	4
(Belarus) U Ignatik (Slovakia) M Kližan	6	6
2	(Germany) M Emmrich (Sweden) A Siljeström	4	4

Semifinals
1	(Spain) D Marrero (Spain) S Ventura	6	6
(Spain) A Menéndez-Maceiras (Spain) A Ramos-Viñolas	2	2
(Spain) I Navarro (Spain) P Riba	3	5
(Belarus) U Ignatik (Slovakia) M Kližan	6	7

Finals
1	(Spain) D Marrero (Spain) S Ventura	7	6
(Belarus) U Ignatik (Slovakia) M Kližan	6^{3}	4
