= 2017 Città di Caltanissetta – Singles =

Singles
- 2017 Città di Caltanissetta

Final
- Champion: (Italy) Paolo Lorenzi
- Runner-up: (Italy) Alessandro Giannessi
- Score: 6–4, 6–2

Events
Singles	Doubles
← 2016 ·	Città di Caltanissetta	· 2018 →

Paolo Lorenzi was the defending champion and successfully defended his title, defeating Alessandro Giannessi 6–4, 6–2 in the final.

== Seeds ==
1. (Italy) Paolo Lorenzi (champion)
2. (Serbia) Dušan Lajović (first round)
3. (Kazakhstan) Mikhail Kukushkin (quarterfinals)
4. (Moldova) Radu Albot (semifinals)
5. (Argentina) Facundo Bagnis (second round)
6. (Italy) Marco Cecchinato (quarterfinals)
7. (Italy) Alessandro Giannessi (final)
8. (United States) Tennys Sandgren (quarterfinals)

== Draw ==
=== Key ===
- Q = Qualifier
- WC = Wild card
- LL = Lucky loser
- Alt = Alternate
- SE = Special exempt
- PR = Protected ranking
- ITF = ITF entry
- JE = Junior exempt
- w/o = Walkover
- r = Retired
- d = Defaulted
- SR = Special ranking

=== Finals ===
Semifinals
1/WC	(Italy) Paolo Lorenzi	6	6
4	(Moldova) Radu Albot	4	4
7	(Italy) Alessandro Giannessi	6	7^{7}
Q	(Germany) Cedrik-Marcel Stebe	3	6^{5}

Final
1/WC	(Italy) Paolo Lorenzi	6	6
7	(Italy) Alessandro Giannessi	4	2

=== Top half ===
First round
1/WC	(Italy) P Lorenzi	7	6
(El Salvador) M Arévalo	5	4
(Italy) A Arnaboldi	4	3
(Serbia) L Đere	6	6
(Argentina) G Andreozzi	6	6
(Russia) A Vatutin	1	4
(Slovakia) J Kovalík	4	4
5	(Argentina) F Bagnis	6	6
4	(Moldova) R Albot	6	7
(Republic of Ireland) J McGee	2	5
(Italy) R Bellotti	6	6
(Italy) F Gaio	3	0
WC	(Italy) S Bolelli	7	6
Q	(Brazil) JP Sorgi	5	2
(Czech Republic) V Šafránek	2	6	2
8	(United States) T Sandgren	6	4	6

Second round
1/WC	(Italy) P Lorenzi	6^{6}	6	6
(Serbia) L Đere	7^{8}	3	2
(Argentina) G Andreozzi	7	7^{7}
5	(Argentina) F Bagnis	5	6^{5}
4	(Moldova) R Albot	2	6	6
(Italy) R Bellotti	6	4	4
WC	(Italy) S Bolelli	6	4	4
8	(United States) T Sandgren	3	6	6

Quarterfinals
1/WC	(Italy) P Lorenzi	6	3	6
(Argentina) G Andreozzi	2	6	4
4	(Moldova) R Albot	6	3	7^{7}
8	(United States) T Sandgren	3	6	6^{4}

Semifinals
1/WC	(Italy) P Lorenzi	6	6
4	(Moldova) R Albot	4	4

=== Bottom half ===
First round
7	(Italy) A Giannessi	7	7
(Spain) E López Pérez	5	5
(Spain) Í Cervantes	3	6	7
Q	(Italy) M Berrettini	6	2	5
(India) R Ramanathan	6	4	7^{8}
Q	(Austria) S Ofner	2	6	6^{6}
WC	(Italy) G Mager	4	0
3	(Kazakhstan) M Kukushkin	6	6
6	(Italy) M Cecchinato	4	7	6
(Spain) J Samper Montaña	6	5	1
(Russia) A Rublev	6	6
(Serbia) M Zekić	3	4
(Italy) S Caruso	5	2
(Italy) S Travaglia	7	6
Q	(Germany) C-M Stebe	6	6
2/WC	(Serbia) D Lajović	2	2

Second round
7	(Italy) A Giannessi	6	6
(Spain) Í Cervantes	2	3
(India) R Ramanathan	0	2
3	(Kazakhstan) M Kukushkin	6	6
6	(Italy) M Cecchinato	7	3	6
(Russia) A Rublev	5	6	3
(Italy) S Travaglia	7^{7}	6^{6}	3
Q	(Germany) C-M Stebe	6^{3}	7^{8}	6

Quarterfinals
7	(Italy) A Giannessi	6	1	6
3	(Kazakhstan) M Kukushkin	4	6	1
6	(Italy) M Cecchinato	1	2
Q	(Germany) C-M Stebe	6	6

Semifinals
7	(Italy) A Giannessi	6	7^{7}
Q	(Germany) C-M Stebe	3	6^{5}
