= 2018 Città di Caltanissetta – Singles =

Singles
- 2018 Città di Caltanissetta

Final
- Champion: (Spain) Jaume Munar
- Runner-up: (Italy) Matteo Donati
- Score: 6–2, 7–6^{(7–2)}

Events
Singles	Doubles
← 2017 ·	Città di Caltanissetta

Paolo Lorenzi was the defending champion but lost in the first round to Alejandro Davidovich Fokina.

Jaume Munar won the title after defeating Matteo Donati 6–2, 7–6^{(7–2)} in the final.

== Seeds ==
1. (Italy) Paolo Lorenzi (first round)
2. (Uruguay) Pablo Cuevas (quarterfinals)
3. (Czech Republic) Jiří Veselý (quarterfinals)
4. (Japan) Taro Daniel (withdrew)
5. (Serbia) Laslo Đere (first round)
6. (Argentina) Guido Andreozzi (first round)
7. (Brazil) Thiago Monteiro (first round)
8. (Italy) Stefano Travaglia (withdrew)

== Draw ==
=== Key ===
- Q = Qualifier
- WC = Wild card
- LL = Lucky loser
- Alt = Alternate
- SE = Special exempt
- PR = Protected ranking
- ITF = ITF entry
- JE = Junior exempt
- w/o = Walkover
- r = Retired
- d = Defaulted
- SR = Special ranking

=== Finals ===
Semifinals
(Spain) Jaume Munar	3	7	7^{8}
(Austria) Dennis Novak	6	5	6^{6}
(Italy) Matteo Donati	0	6	6
(Hungary) Attila Balázs	6	4	4

Final
(Spain) Jaume Munar	6	7^{7}
(Italy) Matteo Donati	2	6^{2}

=== Top half ===
First round
1	(Italy) P Lorenzi	4	0
WC	(Spain) A Davidovich Fokina	6	6
(Dominican Republic) V Estrella Burgos	3	2
(Czech Republic) Z Kolář	6	6
(Argentina) R Olivo	2	0^{r}
(Argentina) F Bagnis	6	4
(Spain) J Munar	0	6	6
5	(Serbia) L Đere	6	2	4
3	(Czech Republic) J Veselý	6	5	7^{7}
WC	(Italy) F Baldi	4	7	6^{4}
Q	(Italy) F Gaio	6	6
Q	(Italy) M Bortolotti	2	1
WC	(Italy) GM Moroni	7^{8}	2	6^{4}
(Austria) D Novak	6^{6}	6	7^{7}
(Italy) S Caruso	7^{8}	6
7	(Brazil) T Monteiro	6^{6}	2

Second round
WC	(Spain) A Davidovich Fokina	3	7	6
(Czech Republic) Z Kolář	6	5	3
(Argentina) F Bagnis	6	2	2
(Spain) J Munar	4	6	6
3	(Czech Republic) J Veselý	4	6	6
Q	(Italy) F Gaio	6	2	4
(Austria) D Novak	6	6
(Italy) S Caruso	3	4

Quarterfinals
WC	(Spain) A Davidovich Fokina	2	1
(Spain) J Munar	6	6
3	(Czech Republic) J Veselý	6	6^{4}	6^{4}
(Austria) D Novak	3	7^{7}	7^{7}

Semifinals
(Spain) J Munar	3	7	7^{8}
(Austria) D Novak	6	5	6^{6}

=== Bottom half ===
First round
Q	(Serbia) M Zekić	7	7^{7}
LL	(Uruguay) M Cuevas	5	6^{5}
(Italy) M Donati	7^{10}	7
(Norway) C Ruud	6^{8}	5
(Italy) L Vanni	2	4
(Latvia) E Gulbis	6	6
(Italy) A Giannessi	6	6
LL	(France) M Janvier	1	4
6	(Argentina) G Andreozzi	3	4
(Slovenia) B Rola	6	6
WC	(Italy) Omar Giacalone	0	2
(Hungary) A Balázs	6	6
(El Salvador) M Arévalo	1	6	7
Q	(Germany) Marc Sieber	6	1	5
(Slovakia) J Kovalík	6	5	4
2	(Uruguay) P Cuevas	3	7	6

Second round
Q	(Serbia) M Zekić
(Italy) M Donati	w/o
(Latvia) E Gulbis	6	6^{3}	1
(Italy) A Giannessi	2	7^{7}	6
(Slovenia) B Rola	1	4
(Hungary) A Balázs	6	6
(El Salvador) M Arévalo	3	1
2	(Uruguay) P Cuevas	6	6

Quarterfinals
(Italy) M Donati	6	0
(Italy) A Giannessi	2	0^{r}
(Hungary) A Balázs	6	6
2	(Uruguay) P Cuevas	3	4

Semifinals
(Italy) M Donati	0	6	6
(Hungary) A Balázs	6	4	4
