= 2014 Città di Caltanissetta – Doubles =

Doubles
- 2014 Città di Caltanissetta

Final
- Champion: (Italy) Daniele Bracciali (Italy) Potito Starace
- Runner-up: (Spain) Pablo Carreño Busta (Spain) Enrique López-Pérez
- Score: 6–3, 6–3

Events
Singles	Doubles
← 2013 ·	Città di Caltanissetta	· 2015 →

Dominik Meffert and Philipp Oswald were the defending champions but decided not to participate.

Daniele Bracciali and Potito Starace won the title, defeating Pablo Carreño Busta and Enrique López-Pérez in the final, 6–3, 6–3.

== Seeds ==
1. (Italy) Daniele Bracciali / (Italy) Potito Starace (champions)
2. (Germany) Frank Moser / (Germany) Alexander Satschko (semifinals)
3. (Italy) Riccardo Ghedin / (Italy) Claudio Grassi (semifinals)
4. (Argentina) Facundo Bagnis / (Peru) Sergio Galdós (first round)

== Draw ==
=== Key ===
- Q = Qualifier
- WC = Wild card
- LL = Lucky loser
- Alt = Alternate
- SE = Special exempt
- PR = Protected ranking
- ITF = ITF entry
- JE = Junior exempt
- w/o = Walkover
- r = Retired
- d = Defaulted
- SR = Special ranking

=== Draw ===
First round
1	(Italy) D Bracciali (Italy) P Starace	6	6
WC	(Italy) Omar Giacalone (Italy) G Naso	2	4
WC	(Italy) S Caruso (Italy) W Trusendi	6	4	[11]
(Croatia) M Delić (Serbia) G Tošić	3	6	[13]
3	(Italy) R Ghedin (Italy) C Grassi	6	7^{7}
(Italy) M Cecchinato (Italy) T Fabbiano	2	6^{4}
(Uruguay) M Cuevas (Uruguay) P Cuevas	2	6	[8]
(Brazil) G Clezar (Brazil) J Souza	6	3	[10]
(Spain) P Carreño Busta (Spain) E López-Pérez	3	7^{7}	[11]
WC	(Chile) N Jarry (Germany) A Zverev	6	6^{2}	[9]
(Ecuador) E Gómez (Tunisia) M Jaziri	6^{5}	7^{7}	[10]
4	(Argentina) F Bagnis (Peru) S Galdós	7^{7}	6^{5}	[7]
(Monaco) B Balleret (Italy) A Motti
(Spain) P Riba (Spain) P Andújar	w/o
(Chile) G Lama (Spain) A Ramos	1	4
2	(Germany) F Moser (Germany) A Satschko	6	6

Quarterfinals
1	(Italy) D Bracciali (Italy) P Starace	6	6
(Croatia) M Delić (Serbia) G Tošić	2	4
3	(Italy) R Ghedin (Italy) C Grassi	6	6
(Brazil) G Clezar (Brazil) J Souza	1	0
(Spain) P Carreño Busta (Spain) E López-Pérez	6	6
(Ecuador) E Gómez (Tunisia) M Jaziri	4	4
(Monaco) B Balleret (Italy) A Motti	5	5
2	(Germany) F Moser (Germany) A Satschko	7	7

Semifinals
1	(Italy) D Bracciali (Italy) P Starace	6	6^{7}	[10]
3	(Italy) R Ghedin (Italy) C Grassi	2	7^{9}	[8]
(Spain) P Carreño Busta (Spain) E López-Pérez	6	7^{7}
2	(Germany) F Moser (Germany) A Satschko	1	6^{1}

Final
1	(Italy) D Bracciali (Italy) P Starace	6	6
(Spain) P Carreño Busta (Spain) E López-Pérez	3	3
