= 2018 Città di Caltanissetta – Doubles =

Doubles
- 2018 Città di Caltanissetta

Final
- Champions: (Italy) Federico Gaio (Italy) Andrea Pellegrino
- Runners-up: (Slovenia) Blaž Rola (Czech Republic) Jiří Veselý
- Score: 7–6^{(7–4)}, 7–6^{(7–5)}

Events
Singles	Doubles
← 2017 ·	Città di Caltanissetta

James Cerretani and Max Schnur were the defending champions but chose not to defend their title.

Federico Gaio and Andrea Pellegrino won the title after defeating Blaž Rola and Jiří Veselý 7–6^{(7–4)}, 7–6^{(7–5)} in the final.

== Seeds ==
1. (El Salvador) Marcelo Arévalo / (Mexico) Miguel Ángel Reyes-Varela (quarterfinals)
2. (Argentina) Guido Andreozzi / (Uruguay) Ariel Behar (first round)
3. (Belarus) Aliaksandr Bury / (Chinese Taipei) Peng Hsien-yin (quarterfinals)
4. (Czech Republic) Roman Jebavý / (Czech Republic) Zdeněk Kolář (first round)

== Draw ==
=== Key ===
- Q = Qualifier
- WC = Wild card
- LL = Lucky loser
- Alt = Alternate
- SE = Special exempt
- PR = Protected ranking
- ITF = ITF entry
- JE = Junior exempt
- w/o = Walkover
- r = Retired
- d = Defaulted
- SR = Special ranking

First round
1	(El Salvador) M Arévalo (Mexico) MÁ Reyes-Varela	6	6
(Hungary) A Balázs (Italy) A Motti	3	3
(Spain) J Munar (Norway) C Ruud	4	2
(Uruguay) M Cuevas (Uruguay) P Cuevas	6	6
4	(Czech Republic) R Jebavý (Czech Republic) Z Kolář	4	2
WC	(Italy) F Gaio (Italy) A Pellegrino	6	6
PR	(Colombia) N Barrientos (Dominican Republic) V Estrella Burgos	4	4
(Poland) T Bednarek (Ukraine) V Uzhylovskyi	6	6
(Slovenia) B Rola (Czech Republic) J Veselý	6	3	[10]
(Philippines) R Gonzales (United States) H Reese	3	6	[2]
WC	(Italy) J Ocleppo (Italy) A Vavassori	4	4
3	(Belarus) A Bury (Chinese Taipei) H-y Peng	6	6
WC	(Italy) D Bracciali (Italy) L Vanni	5	6	[10]
(Austria) D Novak (Austria) T-S Weissborn	7	3	[5]
(Peru) S Galdós (United States) N Pasha	6^{3}	6	[10]
2	(Argentina) G Andreozzi (Uruguay) A Behar	7^{7}	4	[5]

Quarterfinals
1	(El Salvador) M Arévalo (Mexico) MÁ Reyes-Varela	3	6	[5]
(Uruguay) M Cuevas (Uruguay) P Cuevas	6	3	[10]
WC	(Italy) F Gaio (Italy) A Pellegrino	4	7^{8}	[10]
(Poland) T Bednarek (Ukraine) V Uzhylovskyi	6	6^{6}	[3]
(Slovenia) B Rola (Czech Republic) J Veselý	6	3	[10]
3	(Belarus) A Bury (Chinese Taipei) H-y Peng	0	6	[3]
WC	(Italy) D Bracciali (Italy) L Vanni	3	6	[7]
(Peru) S Galdós (United States) N Pasha	6	3	[10]

Semifinals
(Uruguay) M Cuevas (Uruguay) P Cuevas	2	6^{4}
WC	(Italy) F Gaio (Italy) A Pellegrino	6	7^{7}
(Slovenia) B Rola (Czech Republic) J Veselý	6	1	[10]
(Peru) S Galdós (United States) N Pasha	4	6	[6]

Final
WC	(Italy) F Gaio (Italy) A Pellegrino	7^{7}	7^{7}
(Slovenia) B Rola (Czech Republic) J Veselý	6^{4}	6^{5}
