= 2013 Città di Caltanissetta =

- Date: 3–9 June
- Edition: 15th
- Draw: 32S / 16D
- Prize money: $64,000+H
- Surface: Clay
- Location: Caltanissetta, Italy

Champions

Singles
- (Serbia) Dušan Lajović

Doubles
- (Germany) Dominik Meffert / (Austria) Philipp Oswald
← 2012 ·	Città di Caltanissetta	· 2014 →

The 2013 Città di Caltanissetta was a professional tennis tournament played on clay courts. It was the 15th edition of the tournament which was part of the 2013 ATP Challenger Tour. It took place in Caltanissetta, Italy between 3 and 9 June 2013.

== Singles main draw entrants ==
=== Seeds ===
Country	Player	Rank^{1}	Seed
SVK	Martin Kližan	35	1
NED	Robin Haase	66	2
ARG	Leonardo Mayer	73	3
ARG	Guido Pella	83	4
NED	Thiemo de Bakker	95	5
ARG	Martín Alund	100	6
ITA	Filippo Volandri	111	7
ESP	Rubén Ramírez Hidalgo	123	8

- ^{1} Rankings are as of May 27, 2013.

=== Other entrants ===
The following players received wildcards into the singles main draw:

- (Slovakia) Martin Kližan
- (Italy) Salvatore Caruso
- (Italy) Marco Cecchinato
- (Italy) Potito Starace

The following player received entry using a protected ranking:

- (Argentina) Eduardo Schwank

The following players received entry as an alternate into the singles main draw:

- (Italy) Alessandro Giannessi

The following players received entry from the qualifying draw:

- (Italy) Andrea Arnaboldi
- (Chile) Juan Carlos Sáez
- (Argentina) Andrés Molteni
- (Austria) Philipp Oswald

== Doubles main draw entrants ==
=== Seeds ===
Country	Player	Country	Player	Rank^{1}	Seed
GER	Dominik Meffert	AUT	Philipp Oswald	249	1
NED	Thiemo de Bakker	NED	Robin Haase	254	2
CHI	Jorge Aguilar	ARG	Federico Delbonis	336	3
ARG	Renzo Olivo	ARG	Marco Trungelliti	379	4

- ^{1} Rankings as of May 27, 2013.

=== Other entrants ===
The following pairs received wildcards into the doubles main draw:

- (Italy) Marco Cecchinato / (Italy) Alessio di Mauro
- (Italy) Omar Giacalone / (Italy) Gianluca Naso
- (Italy) Walter Trusendi / (Italy) Matteo Viola

== Champions ==
=== Singles ===
- (Serbia) Dušan Lajović def. (Netherlands) Robin Haase, 7–6^{(7–4)}, 6–3

=== Doubles ===
- (Germany) Dominik Meffert / (Austria) Philipp Oswald def. (Italy) Alessandro Giannessi / (Italy) Potito Starace, 6–2, 6–3
