= 2015 Città di Caltanissetta – Doubles =

Doubles
- 2015 Città di Caltanissetta

Final
- Champions: (Argentina) Guido Andreozzi (Argentina) Guillermo Durán
- Runners-up: (Chinese Taipei) Lee Hsin-han (Italy) Alessandro Motti
- Score: 6–3, 6–2

Events
Singles	Doubles
← 2014 ·	Città di Caltanissetta	· 2016 →

Daniele Bracciali and Potito Starace were the defending champions, but they decided not to participate this year.

Guido Andreozzi and Guillermo Durán won the title, defeating Lee Hsin-han and Alessandro Motti in the final, 6–3, 6–2.

== Seeds ==
1. (Germany) Gero Kretschmer / (Germany) Alexander Satschko (first round)
2. (Argentina) Guido Andreozzi / (Argentina) Guillermo Durán (champions)
3. (Romania) Costin Pavăl / (Romania) Adrian Ungur (semifinals)
4. (Chinese Taipei) Lee Hsin-han / (Italy) Alessandro Motti (final)

== Draw ==
=== Key ===
- Q = Qualifier
- WC = Wild card
- LL = Lucky loser
- Alt = Alternate
- SE = Special exempt
- PR = Protected ranking
- ITF = ITF entry
- JE = Junior exempt
- w/o = Walkover
- r = Retired
- d = Defaulted
- SR = Special ranking

First round
1	(Germany) G Kretschmer (Germany) A Satschko	6	6	[10]
(Argentina) M González (Netherlands) J Huta Galung	7	4	[12]
(Portugal) G Elias (Mexico) C Ramírez	3	4
WC	(Italy) G Quinzi (Italy) S Travaglia	6	6
4	(Chinese Taipei) H-h Lee (Italy) A Motti	6	6
PR	(United States) J Cerretani (Australia) A Hubble	2	4
(Italy) M Cecchinato (Italy) R Marcora	1	3
(Colombia) N Barrientos (Colombia) A González	6	6
WC	(Italy) A di Mauro (Italy) Nicolò Schilirò	3	2
(Chinese Taipei) H-y Peng (Chinese Taipei) T-h Yang	6	6
(Sweden) A Siljeström (Sweden) E Ymer	3	6^{6}
3	(Romania) C Pavăl (Romania) A Ungur	6	7^{8}
(Spain) R Carballés Baena (Brazil) G Clezar	3	6	[10]
(Peru) S Galdós (United States) D Novikov	6	2	[7]
WC	(Italy) S Caruso (Italy) F Gaio	6	6^{5}	[5]
2	(Argentina) G Andreozzi (Argentina) G Durán	2	7^{7}	[10]

Quarterfinals
(Argentina) M González (Netherlands) J Huta Galung	3	6	[10]
WC	(Italy) G Quinzi (Italy) S Travaglia	6	3	[5]
4	(Chinese Taipei) H-h Lee (Italy) A Motti	6	7^{9}
(Colombia) N Barrientos (Colombia) A González	2	6^{7}
(Chinese Taipei) H-y Peng (Chinese Taipei) T-h Yang	5	6^{5}
3	(Romania) C Pavăl (Romania) A Ungur	7	7^{7}
(Spain) R Carballés Baena (Brazil) G Clezar	1	3
2	(Argentina) G Andreozzi (Argentina) G Durán	6	6

Semifinals
(Argentina) M González (Netherlands) J Huta Galung	4	6	[5]
4	(Chinese Taipei) H-h Lee (Italy) A Motti	6	3	[10]
3	(Romania) C Pavăl (Romania) A Ungur	4	6	[5]
2	(Argentina) G Andreozzi (Argentina) G Durán	6	0	[10]

Final
4	(Chinese Taipei) H-h Lee (Italy) A Motti	3	2
2	(Argentina) G Andreozzi (Argentina) G Durán	6	6
