= 2014 Città di Caltanissetta – Singles =

Singles
- 2014 Città di Caltanissetta

Final
- Champion: (Spain) Pablo Carreño Busta
- Runner-up: (Argentina) Facundo Bagnis
- Score: 4–6, 6–4, 6–1

Events
Singles	Doubles
← 2013 ·	Città di Caltanissetta	· 2015 →

Dušan Lajović was the defending champion, but competed in the 2014 Aegon Championships instead.

Pablo Carreño Busta won the title, defeating Facundo Bagnis in the final, 4–6, 6–4, 6–1.

== Seeds ==
1. (Spain) Pablo Carreño Busta (champion)
2. (Spain) Pablo Andújar (quarterfinals)
3. (Spain) Pere Riba (second round, retired)
4. (Italy) Filippo Volandri (second round)
5. (Spain) Albert Ramos (first round)
6. (Tunisia) Malek Jaziri (first round, retired)
7. (Uruguay) Pablo Cuevas (quarterfinals)
8. (Argentina) Facundo Bagnis (final)

== Draw ==
=== Key ===
- Q = Qualifier
- WC = Wild card
- LL = Lucky loser
- Alt = Alternate
- SE = Special exempt
- PR = Protected ranking
- ITF = ITF entry
- JE = Junior exempt
- w/o = Walkover
- r = Retired
- d = Defaulted
- SR = Special ranking

=== Finals ===
Semifinals
1	(Spain) Pablo Carreño Busta	4	6	6
(Brazil) João Souza	6	4	1
(Chile) Gonzalo Lama	4	4
8	(Argentina) Facundo Bagnis	6	6

Final
1	(Spain) Pablo Carreño Busta	4	6	6
8	(Argentina) Facundo Bagnis	6	4	1

=== Top half ===
First round
1	(Spain) P Carreño Busta	6	6
WC	(Italy) Claudio Fortuna	4	2
WC	(Italy) S Caruso	2	6	5
(Brazil) G Clezar	6	3	7
(Japan) T Daniel	6^{4}	3
(Spain) E López Pérez	7^{7}	6
Q	(Italy) C Grassi	1	3
7	(Uruguay) P Cuevas	6	6
4	(Italy) F Volandri	6	6
(Monaco) B Balleret	1	3
(Croatia) M Delić	6^{2}	7^{9}	6
WC	(Italy) M Donati	7^{7}	6^{7}	1
(Hungary) M Fucsovics	6	3	7^{7}
WC	(Italy) G Naso	3	6	6^{5}
(Brazil) J Souza	6	3
6	(Tunisia) M Jaziri	1	0^{r}

Second round
1	(Spain) P Carreño Busta	6	7
(Brazil) G Clezar	3	5
(Spain) E López Pérez	3	0
7	(Uruguay) P Cuevas	6	6
4	(Italy) F Volandri	0	6^{9}
(Croatia) M Delić	6	7^{11}
(Hungary) M Fucsovics	5	6^{4}
(Brazil) J Souza	7	7^{7}

Quarterfinals
1	(Spain) P Carreño Busta	7	7
7	(Uruguay) P Cuevas	5	5
(Croatia) M Delić	4	2
(Brazil) J Souza	6	6

Semifinals
1	(Spain) P Carreño Busta	4	6	6
(Brazil) J Souza	6	4	1

=== Bottom half ===
First round
5	(Spain) A Ramos	3	6^{4}
(Italy) P Starace	6	7^{7}
(Ecuador) E Gómez	6	4	2
(Italy) A Arnaboldi	4	6	6
(Italy) T Fabbiano	3	7	5
(Chile) G Lama	6	5	7
Q	(Sweden) C Lindell	4	2
3	(Spain) P Riba	6	6
8	(Argentina) F Bagnis	6	3
(Venezuela) D Souto	3	0^{r}
(Argentina) A Velotti	3	4
(Italy) M Cecchinato	6	6
Q	(Sweden) M Eriksson	6	2	7
Q	(Germany) A Zverev	3	6	5
(Argentina) M Trungelliti	2	1
2	(Spain) P Andújar	6	6

Second round
(Italy) P Starace	6	6
(Italy) A Arnaboldi	4	4
(Chile) G Lama	6	4
3	(Spain) P Riba	1	2^{r}
8	(Argentina) F Bagnis	7^{7}	7^{7}
(Italy) M Cecchinato	6^{3}	6^{2}
Q	(Sweden) M Eriksson	6	3	2
2	(Spain) P Andújar	1	6	6

Quarterfinals
(Italy) P Starace	6^{5}	4
(Chile) G Lama	7^{7}	6
8	(Argentina) F Bagnis	6	6
2	(Spain) P Andújar	4	4

Semifinals
(Chile) G Lama	4	4
8	(Argentina) F Bagnis	6	6
