= 2017 Città di Caltanissetta =

- Date: 12–18 June
- Edition: 19th
- Draw: 32S / 16D
- Surface: Clay
- Location: Caltanissetta, Italy

Champions

Singles
- (Italy) Paolo Lorenzi

Doubles
- (United States) James Cerretani / (United States) Max Schnur
← 2016 ·	Città di Caltanissetta	· 2018 →

The 2017 Città di Caltanissetta was a professional tennis tournament played on clay courts. It was the 19th edition of the tournament which was part of the 2017 ATP Challenger Tour. It took place in Caltanissetta, Italy between 12 and 18 June 2017.

== Singles main-draw entrants ==
=== Seeds ===
Country	Player	Rank^{1}	Seed
ITA	Paolo Lorenzi	34	1
SRB	Dušan Lajović	81	2
KAZ	Mikhail Kukushkin	85	3
MDA	Radu Albot	88	4
ARG	Facundo Bagnis	101	5
ITA	Marco Cecchinato	104	6
ITA	Alessandro Giannessi	109	7
USA	Tennys Sandgren	113	8

- ^{1} Rankings are as of 29 May 2017.

=== Other entrants ===
The following players received wildcards into the singles main draw:

- (Italy) Simone Bolelli
- (Serbia) Dušan Lajović
- (Italy) Paolo Lorenzi
- (Italy) Gianluca Mager

The following players received entry from the qualifying draw:

- (Italy) Matteo Berrettini
- (Austria) Sebastian Ofner
- (Brazil) João Pedro Sorgi
- (Germany) Cedrik-Marcel Stebe

== Champions ==
=== Singles ===
- (Italy) Paolo Lorenzi def. (Italy) Alessandro Giannessi 6–4, 6–2.

=== Doubles ===
- (United States) James Cerretani / (United States) Max Schnur def. (Ukraine) Denys Molchanov / (Croatia) Franko Škugor 6–3, 3–6, [10–6].
