= 2013 Pekao Szczecin Open =

- Date: 16–22 September
- Edition: 21st
- Surface: Clay
- Location: Szczecin, Poland

Champions

Singles
- (Ukraine) Oleksandr Nedovyesov

Doubles
- (United Kingdom) Ken Skupski / (United Kingdom) Neal Skupski
- Pekao Szczecin Open

The 2013 Pekao Szczecin Open was a professional tennis tournament played on clay courts. It was the 21st edition of the tournament which was part of the 2013 ATP Challenger Tour. It took place in Szczecin, Poland between 16 and 22 September 2013.

== Singles main draw entrants ==
=== Seeds ===
Country	Player	Rank^{1}	Seed
ESP	Albert Montañés	53	1
ESP	Pablo Andújar	54	2
FRA	Guillaume Rufin	81	3
~~BRA~~	~~Thomaz Bellucci~~	~~116~~	~~4~~
ARG	Diego Sebastián Schwartzman	137	5
GER	Dustin Brown	146	6
UKR	Oleksandr Nedovyesov	152	7
ESP	Pere Riba	157	8
RSA	Rik de Voest	162	9

- ^{1} Rankings are as of September 9, 2013.

=== Other entrants ===
The following players received wildcards into the singles main draw:

- (Poland) Paweł Ciaś
- (Poland) Piotr Gadomski
- (Poland) Kamil Majchrzak
- (Spain) Albert Montañés

The following players received entry from the qualifying draw:

- (Croatia) Mate Delić
- (Czech Republic) Jan Kuncik
- (Poland) Grzegorz Panfil
- (Czech Republic) Michal Schmid

== Champions ==
=== Singles ===
- (Ukraine) Oleksandr Nedovyesov def. (Spain) Pere Riba 6–2, 7–5

=== Doubles ===
- (United Kingdom) Ken Skupski / (United Kingdom) Neal Skupski def. (Italy) Andrea Arnaboldi / (Italy) Alessandro Giannessi 6–4, 1–6, [10–7]
