= 2011 Città di Caltanissetta – Doubles =

Doubles
- 2011 Città di Caltanissetta

Final
- Champions: (Italy) Daniele Bracciali (Italy) Simone Vagnozzi
- Runners-up: (Italy) Daniele Giorgini (Romania) Adrian Ungur
- Score: 3–6, 7–6(2), [10–7]

Events
Singles	Doubles
← 2010 ·	Città di Caltanissetta	· 2012 →

David Marrero and Santiago Ventura were the defending champions but decided not to participate.
Daniele Bracciali and Simone Vagnozzi won the final 3–6, 7–6(2), [10–7] against Daniele Giorgini and Adrian Ungur.

== Seeds ==
1. (Italy) Daniele Bracciali / (Italy) Simone Vagnozzi (champions)
2. (United States) Travis Rettenmaier / (Croatia) Lovro Zovko (first round)
3. (Germany) Denis Gremelmayr / (Netherlands) Rogier Wassen (semifinals)
4. (Chile) Hans Podlipnik / (Austria) Max Raditschnigg (quarterfinals)

== Draw ==
=== Key ===
- Q = Qualifier
- WC = Wild card
- LL = Lucky loser
- Alt = Alternate
- SE = Special exempt
- PR = Protected ranking
- ITF = ITF entry
- JE = Junior exempt
- w/o = Walkover
- r = Retired
- d = Defaulted
- SR = Special ranking

=== Draw ===
First round
1	(Italy) D Bracciali (Italy) S Vagnozzi	6	6
(Spain) J Martí (Netherlands) T Schoorel	2	4
(Italy) Andrea Arnaboldi (Spain) A Menéndez	7	3	[10]
(Spain) P Carreño-Busta (Spain) P Santos	6^{4}	6	[7]
3	(Germany) D Gremelmayr (Netherlands) R Wassen	6	6
WC	(Italy) E Burzi (Italy) Marco Cecchinato	2	2
WC	(Italy) S Galvani (Italy) M Trevisan	2	1
(Serbia) N Ćirić (Serbia) B Pašanski	6	6
(Italy) A di Mauro (Italy) G Naso	4	1
(Italy) D Giorgini (Romania) A Ungur	6	6
(Germany) Alexander Flock (Austria) A Haider-Maurer	6	6^{5}	[3]
4	(Chile) H Podlipnik (Austria) M Raditschnigg	3	7	[10]
(France) J Eysseric (France) B Paire	6	6
(Germany) S Greul (Germany) B Knittel	3	2
WC	(Italy) F Aldi (Italy) A Brizzi	7	6
2	(United States) T Rettenmaier (Croatia) L Zovko	6^{3}	4

Quarterfinals
1	(Italy) D Bracciali (Italy) S Vagnozzi	7	4	[10]
(Italy) Andrea Arnaboldi (Spain) A Menéndez	6^{4}	6	[7]
3	(Germany) D Gremelmayr (Netherlands) R Wassen	6	6
(Serbia) N Ćirić (Serbia) B Pašanski	1	2
(Italy) D Giorgini (Romania) A Ungur	6	3	[10]
4	(Chile) H Podlipnik (Austria) M Raditschnigg	1	6	[8]
(France) J Eysseric (France) B Paire
WC	(Italy) F Aldi (Italy) A Brizzi	w/o

Semifinals
1	(Italy) D Bracciali (Italy) S Vagnozzi	6	6
3	(Germany) D Gremelmayr (Netherlands) R Wassen	3	1
(Italy) D Giorgini (Romania) A Ungur	6	7
WC	(Italy) F Aldi (Italy) A Brizzi	4	5

Final
1	(Italy) D Bracciali (Italy) S Vagnozzi	3	7	[10]
(Italy) D Giorgini (Romania) A Ungur	6	6^{2}	[7]
