= 2010 Città di Caltanissetta – Singles =

Singles
- 2010 Città di Caltanissetta

Final
- Champion: (Netherlands) Robin Haase
- Runner-up: (Italy) Matteo Trevisan
- Score: 7–5, 6–3

Events
Singles	Doubles
← 2009 ·	Città di Caltanissetta	· 2011 →

Jesse Huta Galung was the defending champion, but he lost to Albert Ramos Viñolas in the first round.
The new champion was another Dutch player, Robin Haase, who won in the final 7–5, 6–3, against Matteo Trevisan.

== Seeds ==
1. (Spain) Santiago Ventura (first round)
2. (Italy) Paolo Lorenzi (quarterfinals)
3. (Spain) Pere Riba (quarterfinals)
4. (Spain) Iván Navarro (semifinals)
5. (Spain) Rubén Ramírez Hidalgo (second round)
6. (Slovenia) Grega Žemlja (semifinals)
7. (Spain) David Marrero (first round)
8. (Czech Republic) Ivo Minář (first round)

== Draw ==
=== Key ===
- Q = Qualifier
- WC = Wild card
- LL = Lucky loser
- Alt = Alternate
- SE = Special exempt
- PR = Protected ranking
- ITF = ITF entry
- JE = Junior exempt
- w/o = Walkover
- r = Retired
- d = Defaulted
- SR = Special ranking

=== Finals ===
Semifinals
6	(Slovenia) Grega Žemlja	6	6^{4}	6^{5}
PR	(Netherlands) Robin Haase	4	7	7
4	(Spain) Iván Navarro	6	3	6^{6}
WC	(Italy) Matteo Trevisan	2	6	7

Final
PR	(Netherlands) Robin Haase	7	6
WC	(Italy) Matteo Trevisan	5	3

=== Top half ===
First round
1	(Spain) S Ventura	2	6^{5}
(Croatia) A Veić	6	7
(Italy) F Volandri	6	6
(Argentina) S Decoud	0	3
SE	(Japan) Y Sugita	5	3
(Belarus) U Ignatik	7	6
(Brazil) C Zampieri	3	2
6	(Slovenia) G Žemlja	6	6
3	(Spain) P Riba	6^{5}	6	6
(Austria) P Oswald	7	3	2
Q	(Brazil) L Kirche	1	3
(Slovakia) M Kližan	6	6
(Argentina) D Junqueira	6	6^{4}	5
(Spain) A Menéndez Maceiras	2	7	7
PR	(Netherlands) R Haase	2	7	7
7	(Spain) D Marrero	6	6^{3}	6^{7}

Second round
(Croatia) A Veić	6	6
(Italy) F Volandri	1	4
(Belarus) U Ignatik	5	7	3
6	(Slovenia) G Žemlja	7	6^{5}	6
3	(Spain) P Riba	7	6
(Slovakia) M Kližan	5	0
(Spain) A Menéndez Maceiras	4	6	2
PR	(Netherlands) R Haase	6	4	6

Quarterfinals
(Croatia) A Veić	2	2
6	(Slovenia) G Žemlja	6	6
3	(Spain) P Riba	3	1
PR	(Netherlands) R Haase	6	6

Semifinals
6	(Slovenia) G Žemlja	6	6^{4}	6^{5}
PR	(Netherlands) R Haase	4	7	7

=== Bottom half ===
First round
8	(Czech Republic) I Minář	3	6^{3}
WC	(Italy) A di Mauro	6	7
(Czech Republic) D Lojda	2	3
Q	(Argentina) M Alund	6	6
(Netherlands) J Huta Galung	4	3
(Spain) A Ramos Viñolas	6	6
Q	(Italy) D Giorgini	7	3	2
4	(Spain) I Navarro	6^{1}	6	6
5	(Spain) R Ramírez Hidalgo	6	6
(France) J Dasnières de Veigy	3	4
Q	(Croatia) F Škugor	3	6	2
WC	(Italy) M Trevisan	6	3	6
WC	(Italy) F Aldi	2	3
(United States) J Witten	6	6
(Argentina) C Berlocq	4	6^{5}
2/WC	(Italy) P Lorenzi	6	7

Second round
WC	(Italy) A di Mauro	3	2
Q	(Argentina) M Alund	6	6
(Spain) A Ramos Viñolas	5	4
4	(Spain) I Navarro	7	6
5	(Spain) R Ramírez Hidalgo	3	2
WC	(Italy) M Trevisan	6	6
(United States) J Witten	6	6^{4}	6^{5}
2/WC	(Italy) P Lorenzi	4	7	7

Quarterfinals
Q	(Argentina) M Alund	4	4
4	(Spain) I Navarro	6	6
WC	(Italy) M Trevisan	7	1	6
2/WC	(Italy) P Lorenzi	6^{6}	6	2

Semifinals
4	(Spain) I Navarro	6	3	6^{6}
WC	(Italy) M Trevisan	2	6	7
