= 2013 Città di Caltanissetta – Doubles =

Doubles
- 2013 Città di Caltanissetta

Final
- Champions: (Germany) Dominik Meffert (Austria) Philipp Oswald
- Runners-up: (Italy) Alessandro Giannessi (Italy) Potito Starace
- Score: 6–2, 6–3

Events
Singles	Doubles
← 2012 ·	Città di Caltanissetta	· 2014 →

Marcel Felder and Antonio Veić were the defending champions but decided not to participate.
Dominik Meffert and Philipp Oswald won the title by defeating Alessandro Giannessi and Potito Starace 6–2, 6–3 in the final.

== Seeds ==
1. (Germany) Dominik Meffert / (Austria) Philipp Oswald (champions)
2. (Netherlands) Thiemo de Bakker / (Netherlands) Robin Haase (semifinals)
3. (Chile) Jorge Aguilar / (Argentina) Federico Delbonis (first round)
4. (Argentina) Renzo Olivo / (Argentina) Marco Trungelliti (quarterfinals)

== Draw ==
=== Key ===
- Q = Qualifier
- WC = Wild card
- LL = Lucky loser
- Alt = Alternate
- SE = Special exempt
- PR = Protected ranking
- ITF = ITF entry
- JE = Junior exempt
- w/o = Walkover
- r = Retired
- d = Defaulted
- SR = Special ranking

=== Draw ===
First round
1	(Germany) D Meffert (Austria) P Oswald	6	7^{9}
(Argentina) A Molteni (Argentina) E Schwank	3	6^{7}
(Italy) A Motti (Italy) Matteo Volante	7^{7}	6
(Argentina) L Mayer (Argentina) A Velotti	6^{4}	2
4	(Argentina) R Olivo (Argentina) M Trungelliti	7^{9}	7^{7}
(India) S Devvarman (Serbia) D Lajović	6^{7}	6^{3}
(Italy) A Arnaboldi (Spain) G Olaso	6	6
(Brazil) T Alves (Belgium) A De Greef	1	0
(Argentina) M Alund (Argentina) G Pella	2	6	[10]
WC	(Italy) M Cecchinato (Italy) A di Mauro	6	2	[7]
WC	(Italy) Omar Giacalone (Italy) G Naso	6	7^{7}
3	(Chile) J Aguilar (Argentina) F Delbonis	4	6^{3}
(Italy) A Giannessi (Italy) P Starace	6^{4}	7^{7}	[10]
WC	(Italy) W Trusendi (Italy) M Viola	7^{7}	6^{0}	[6]
(Spain) A Menéndez-Maceiras (Spain) R Ramírez Hidalgo	6	5	[5]
2	(Netherlands) T de Bakker (Netherlands) R Haase	2	7	[10]

Quarterfinals
1	(Germany) D Meffert (Austria) P Oswald	7	4	[10]
(Italy) A Motti (Italy) M Volante	5	6	[5]
4	(Argentina) R Olivo (Argentina) M Trungelliti	1	3
(Italy) A Arnaboldi (Spain) G Olaso	6	6
(Argentina) M Alund (Argentina) G Pella	4	1
WC	(Italy) O Giacalone (Italy) G Naso	6	6
(Italy) A Giannessi (Italy) P Starace	7^{7}	6^{5}	[10]
2	(Netherlands) T de Bakker (Netherlands) R Haase	6^{5}	7^{7}	[2]

Semifinals
1	(Germany) D Meffert (Austria) P Oswald	6	4	[10]
(Italy) A Arnaboldi (Spain) G Olaso	2	6	[7]
WC	(Italy) O Giacalone (Italy) G Naso	3	3
(Italy) A Giannessi (Italy) P Starace	6	6

Final
1	(Germany) D Meffert (Austria) P Oswald	6	6
(Italy) A Giannessi (Italy) P Starace	2	3
