= 2012 Città di Caltanissetta – Doubles =

Doubles
- 2012 Città di Caltanissetta

Final
- Champions: (Uruguay) Marcel Felder (Croatia) Antonio Veić
- Runners-up: (Spain) Daniel Gimeno-Traver (Spain) Iván Navarro
- Score: 5–7, 7–6^{(7–5)}, [10–6]

Events
Singles	Doubles
← 2011 ·	Città di Caltanissetta	· 2013 →

Daniele Bracciali and Simone Vagnozzi were the defending champions but decided Bracciali not to participate.
Marcel Felder and Antonio Veić won the title, defeating Daniel Gimeno-Traver and Iván Navarro in the final 5–7, 7–6^{(7–5)}, [10–6].

== Seeds ==
1. (Austria) Julian Knowle / (Austria) Philipp Oswald (first round)
2. (Germany) Andre Begemann / (Australia) Jordan Kerr (quarterfinals)
3. (Uruguay) Marcel Felder / (Croatia) Antonio Veić (champions)
4. (Spain) Daniel Gimeno-Traver / (Spain) Iván Navarro (Runners Up)

== Draw ==
=== Key ===
- Q = Qualifier
- WC = Wild card
- LL = Lucky loser
- Alt = Alternate
- SE = Special exempt
- PR = Protected ranking
- ITF = ITF entry
- JE = Junior exempt
- w/o = Walkover
- r = Retired
- d = Defaulted
- SR = Special ranking

=== Draw ===
First round
1	(Austria) J Knowle (Austria) P Oswald	6	4	[9]
WC	(Italy) Enrico Becuzzi (Italy) P Lorenzi	0	6	[11]
(Italy) A di Mauro (Italy) M Viola	4	6	[6]
(Germany) D Meffert (Netherlands) T Schoorel	6	4	[10]
4	(Spain) D Gimeno-Traver (Spain) I Navarro	6	7
(Argentina) M González (Argentina) D Junqueira	4	5
(Belgium) M Authom (Belgium) Y Mertens	3	2
(Spain) I Cervantes Huegun (Spain) J Martí	6	6
(Italy) S Ianni (Italy) S Vagnozzi	7	4	[7]
(Argentina) M Alund (Argentina) G Pella	5	6	[10]
(Brazil) R Dutra da Silva (Brazil) J Silva	7	2	[7]
3	(Uruguay) M Felder (Croatia) A Veić	5	6	[10]
WC	(Italy) Omar Giacalone (Italy) G Naso	6	6
WC	(Italy) Antonio Campo (Italy) Marco Cecchinato	1	4
(Brazil) T Alves (Portugal) G Elias	3	1
2	(Germany) A Begemann (Australia) J Kerr	6	6

Quarterfinals
WC	(Italy) Enrico Becuzzi (Italy) P Lorenzi	w/o
(Germany) D Meffert (Netherlands) T Schoorel
4	(Spain) D Gimeno-Traver (Spain) I Navarro	7^{7}	4	[10]
(Spain) I Cervantes Huegun (Spain) J Martí	6^{3}	6	[4]
(Argentina) M Alund (Argentina) G Pella	1	2
3	(Uruguay) M Felder (Croatia) A Veić	6	6
WC	(Italy) Omar Giacalone (Italy) G Naso	3	7^{7}	[10]
2	(Germany) A Begemann (Australia) J Kerr	6	6^{5}	[5]

Semifinals
WC	(Italy) Enrico Becuzzi (Italy) P Lorenzi	1	1
4	(Spain) D Gimeno-Traver (Spain) I Navarro	6	6
3	(Uruguay) M Felder (Croatia) A Veić	7^{7}	6
WC	(Italy) Omar Giacalone (Italy) G Naso	6^{2}	2

Final
4	(Spain) D Gimeno-Traver (Spain) I Navarro	7	6^{5}	[6]
3	(Uruguay) M Felder (Croatia) A Veić	5	7	[10]
