= 2009 Città di Caltanissetta – Singles =

Singles
- 2009 Città di Caltanissetta

Final
- Champion: (Netherlands) Jesse Huta Galung
- Runner-up: (Netherlands) Thiemo de Bakker
- Score: 6–2, 6–3

Events
| Singles | Doubles |
| ← 2008 · | Città di Caltanissetta | · 2010 → |

Gianluca Naso was the defending champion, but he lost to Alexander Flock in the first round.
Jesse Huta Galung defeated his compatriot Thiemo de Bakker in the final (6–2, 6–3).

== Seeds ==
1. (France) Adrian Mannarino (second round)
2. (Italy) Tomas Tenconi (first round)
3. (Belgium) Xavier Malisse (semifinals)
4. (Kazakhstan) Yuri Schukin (first round)
5. (Denmark) Kristian Pless (first round)
6. (Netherlands) Jesse Huta Galung (champion)
7. (France) Éric Prodon (first round)
8. (Argentina) Juan Pablo Brzezicki (quarterfinals)

== Draw ==
=== Key ===
- Q = Qualifier
- WC = Wild card
- LL = Lucky loser
- Alt = Alternate
- SE = Special exempt
- PR = Protected ranking
- ITF = ITF entry
- JE = Junior exempt
- w/o = Walkover
- r = Retired
- d = Defaulted
- SR = Special ranking

=== Final four ===
Semifinals
6 | (Netherlands) Jesse Huta Galung | 2 | 6 | 6
(Spain) David Marrero | 6 | 4 | 3
3 | (Belgium) Xavier Malisse | 6 | 5 | 1
Q | (Netherlands) Thiemo de Bakker | 3 | 7 | 6

Final
6 | (Netherlands) Jesse Huta Galung | 6 | 6
Q | (Netherlands) Thiemo de Bakker | 2 | 3

=== Top half ===
First round
1/WC | (France) A Mannarino | 4 | 7 | 6
Q | (Poland) J Janowicz | 6 | 5 | 3
(France) T Ascione | 6^{4} | 3
(Belgium) N Desein | 7^{7} | 6
Q | (Netherlands) N van der Meer | 2 | 3
WC | (Italy) D Sanguinetti | 6 | 6
(Romania) A Ungur | 0 | 2
6 | (Netherlands) J Huta Galung | 6 | 6
4 | (Kazakhstan) Y Schukin | 6 | 3 | 1
(Italy) S Vagnozzi | 2 | 6 | 6
(Spain) D Marrero | 6 | 6
(Italy) G Petrazzuolo | 4 | 4
(Italy) G Naso | 6^{5} | 6^{3}
(Germany) Alexander Flock | 7^{7} | 7^{7}
(Argentina) M Alund | 6 | 3 | 3
8 | (Argentina) JP Brzezicki | 3 | 6 | 6

Second round
1/WC | (France) A Mannarino | 6 | 1 | 3
(Belgium) N Desein | 3 | 6 | 6
WC | (Italy) D Sanguinetti | 6^{5} | 5
6 | (Netherlands) J Huta Galung | 7^{7} | 7
(Italy) S Vagnozzi | 7 | 3 | 1
(Spain) D Marrero | 5 | 6 | 6
(Germany) A Flock | 7 | 6^{3} | 4
8 | (Argentina) JP Brzezicki | 5 | 7^{7} | 6

Quarterfinals
(Belgium) N Desein | 6^{5} | 1
6 | (Netherlands) J Huta Galung | 7^{7} | 6
(Spain) D Marrero | 6 | 6
8 | (Argentina) JP Brzezicki | 2 | 3

Semifinals
6 | (Netherlands) J Huta Galung | 2 | 6 | 6
(Spain) D Marrero | 6 | 4 | 3

=== Bottom half ===
First round
7 | (France) É Prodon | 4 | 3
(Peru) I Miranda | 6 | 6
(Netherlands) M Middelkoop | 1 | 3
Q | (Italy) F Aldi | 6 | 6
(Brazil) D Silva | 0 | 0
(Slovenia) B Kavčič | 6 | 6
(Croatia) A Veić | 4 | 2
3 | (Belgium) X Malisse | 6 | 6
5 | (Denmark) K Pless | 3 | 3
(Italy) M Crugnola | 6 | 6
Q | (Netherlands) T de Bakker | 6 | 6
WC | (Italy) D Bracciali | 1 | 3
(Italy) S Galvani | 7^{7} | 4 | 6
(Belgium) R Bemelmans | 6^{5} | 6 | 3
(Italy) A di Mauro | 7 | 6
2/WC | (Italy) T Tenconi | 5 | 2

Second round
(Peru) I Miranda | 6 | 6
Q | (Italy) F Aldi | 2 | 4
(Slovenia) B Kavčič | 3 | 6 | 1
3 | (Belgium) X Malisse | 6 | 3 | 6
(Italy) M Crugnola | 6 | 1 | 0
Q | (Netherlands) T de Bakker | 1 | 6 | 6
(Italy) S Galvani | 2 | 6 | 6
(Italy) A di Mauro | 6 | 3 | 3

Quarterfinals
(Peru) I Miranda | 6^{4} | 2
3 | (Belgium) X Malisse | 7^{7} | 6
Q | (Netherlands) T de Bakker | 6 | 6
(Italy) S Galvani | 2 | 3

Semifinals
3 | (Belgium) X Malisse | 6 | 5 | 1
Q | (Netherlands) T de Bakker | 3 | 7 | 6
