= 2013 Pekao Szczecin Open – Singles =

Singles
- 2013 Pekao Szczecin Open

Final
- Champion: (Ukraine) Oleksandr Nedovyesov
- Runner-up: (Spain) Pere Riba
- Score: 6–2, 7–5

Events
Singles	Doubles
- Pekao Szczecin Open

Victor Hănescu was the defending champion but decided not to participate.
7th seed Oleksandr Nedovyesov defeated 8th seed Pere Riba 6–2, 7–5

== Seeds ==
1. (Spain) Albert Montañés (first round)
2. (Spain) Pablo Andújar (quarterfinals)
3. (France) Guillaume Rufin (second round, retired)
4. (Brazil) Thomaz Bellucci (withdrew)
5. (Argentina) Diego Sebastián Schwartzman (semifinals)
6. (Germany) Dustin Brown (second round)
7. (Ukraine) Oleksandr Nedovyesov (champion)
8. (Spain) Pere Riba (final)
9. (South Africa) Rik de Voest (first round)

== Draw ==
Key

- Q = Qualifier
- WC = Wild card
- LL = Lucky loser
- Alt = Alternate
- ITF = ITF entry
- PR = Protected ranking
- SR = Special ranking
- SE = Special exempt
- JE = Junior exempt
- JR = Junior Accelerator Programme entrant
- CO = College Accelerator Programme entrant
- NG = Next Gen Accelerator Program entrant
- w/o = Walkover
- r = Retired
- d = Defaulted

=== Finals ===
Semifinals
5	(Argentina) Diego Sebastián Schwartzman	7^{7}	2	3
7	(Ukraine) Oleksandr Nedovyesov	6^{2}	6	6
8	(Spain) Pere Riba	6	6^{2}	6
(Italy) Potito Starace	3	7^{7}	3

Final
7	(Ukraine) Oleksandr Nedovyesov	6	7
8	(Spain) Pere Riba	2	5

=== Top half ===
First round
1/WC	(Spain) A Montañés	1	6^{5}
(Serbia) B Pašanski	6	7^{7}
Q	(Poland) G Panfil	6	6
LL	(Spain) J Checa-Calvo	2	2
(Italy) M Cecchinato	6
(Italy) A Giannessi	6^{r}
(Italy) A di Mauro	4	1
5	(Argentina) DS Schwartzman	6	6
3	(France) G Rufin	6	7^{8}
(Germany) D Meffert	1	6^{6}
(Germany) T Pütz	6^{6}	4
(Croatia) A Veić	7^{7}	6
(Ukraine) D Molchanov	4	1
Q	(Croatia) M Delić	6	6
Q	(Czech Republic) Jan Kuncik	2	7^{7}	2
7	(Ukraine) O Nedovyesov	6	6^{5}	6

Second round
(Serbia) B Pašanski	4	4
Q	(Poland) G Panfil	6	6
(Italy) M Cecchinato	3	4
5	(Argentina) DS Schwartzman	6	6
3	(France) G Rufin	6	4	0^{r}
(Croatia) A Veić	4	6	1
Q	(Croatia) M Delić	6	3	0
7	(Ukraine) O Nedovyesov	3	6	6

Quarterfinals
Q	(Poland) G Panfil	4	6	5
5	(Argentina) DS Schwartzman	5	3	7
(Croatia) A Veić	6	5	3
7	(Ukraine) O Nedovyesov	4	7	6

Semifinals
5	(Argentina) DS Schwartzman	7^{7}	2	3
7	(Ukraine) O Nedovyesov	6^{2}	6	6

=== Bottom half ===
First round
8	(Spain) P Riba	6	6
WC	(Poland) K Majchrzak	3	1
(Germany) S Greul	6^{5}	6	6
(France) A Michon	7^{7}	3	2
(Czech Republic) J Mertl	6	6
Q	(Czech Republic) Michal Schmid	3	2
(Canada) S Diez	6	7
9	(South Africa) R de Voest	4	5
6	(Germany) D Brown	6	6
(Ukraine) I Sergeyev	3	2
(Italy) P Starace	6	6
WC	(Poland) Piotr Gadomski	2	3
WC	(Poland) Pawel Cias	4	3
(Italy) A Arnaboldi	6	6
(France) F Serra	6^{4}	6	5
2	(Spain) P Andújar	7^{7}	4	7

Second round
8	(Spain) P Riba	6	6
(Germany) S Greul	3	0
(Czech Republic) J Mertl	7^{7}	6^{4}	6
(Canada) S Diez	6^{2}	7^{7}	1
6	(Germany) D Brown	7^{7}	3	4
(Italy) P Starace	6^{2}	6	6
(Italy) A Arnaboldi	1	6	4
2	(Spain) P Andújar	6	4	6

Quarterfinals
8	(Spain) P Riba	6	6
(Czech Republic) J Mertl	1	3
(Italy) P Starace	6	7
2	(Spain) P Andújar	1	5

Semifinals
8	(Spain) P Riba	6	6^{2}	6
(Italy) P Starace	3	7^{7}	3
