= 2012 Città di Caltanissetta – Singles =

Singles
- 2012 Città di Caltanissetta

Final
- Champion: (Spain) Tommy Robredo
- Runner-up: (Portugal) Gastão Elias
- Score: 6–3, 6–2

Events
Singles	Doubles
- Città di Caltanissetta

Andreas Haider-Maurer was the defending champion but decided not to participate.
Tommy Robredo won the title by defeating Gastão Elias 6–3, 6–2 in the final.

== Seeds ==
1. (Colombia) Alejandro Falla (first round)
2. (Italy) Paolo Lorenzi (first round)
3. (Portugal) Frederico Gil (second round)
4. (Spain) Roberto Bautista Agut (second round)
5. (Croatia) Antonio Veić (second round)
6. (Brazil) Rogério Dutra da Silva (second round)
7. (Spain) Daniel Gimeno Traver (first round)
8. (Slovenia) Grega Žemlja (second round)

== Draw ==
Key

- Q = Qualifier
- WC = Wild card
- LL = Lucky loser
- Alt = Alternate
- ITF = ITF entry
- PR = Protected ranking
- SR = Special ranking
- SE = Special exempt
- JE = Junior exempt
- JR = Junior Accelerator Programme entrant
- CO = College Accelerator Programme entrant
- NG = Next Gen Accelerator Program entrant
- w/o = Walkover
- r = Retired
- d = Defaulted

=== Finals ===
Semifinals
(Spain) Íñigo Cervantes Huegun	4	2
WC	(Spain) Tommy Robredo	6	6
Q	(Colombia) Alejandro González	7	4	3
(Portugal) Gastão Elias	5	6	6

Final
WC	(Spain) Tommy Robredo	6	6
(Portugal) Gastão Elias	3	2

=== Top half ===
First round
1/WC	(Colombia) A Falla	3	3
(Netherlands) T Schoorel	6	6
Q	(Serbia) B Pašanski	5	4
(Italy) S Vagnozzi	7	6
(Belgium) Y Mertens	6	1	2
(Spain) I Cervantes Huegun	4	6	6
(Argentina) M González	6	6
7	(Spain) D Gimeno Traver	3	4
4	(Spain) R Bautista Agut	6	6
LL	(Italy) Omar Giacalone	2	0
WC	(Spain) T Robredo	6	7
(Serbia) D Lajović	1	5
(Italy) M Viola	6	6
WC	(Italy) Marco Cecchinato	3	2
(Argentina) M Alund	2	0
6	(Brazil) R Dutra da Silva	6	6

Second round
(Netherlands) T Schoorel	6	6
(Italy) S Vagnozzi	4	2
(Spain) I Cervantes Huegun	6	6
(Argentina) M González	4	2
4	(Spain) R Bautista Agut	6	6^{3}	3
WC	(Spain) T Robredo	4	7^{7}	6
(Italy) M Viola	6^{4}	6	6
6	(Brazil) R Dutra da Silva	7^{7}	2	2

Quarterfinals
(Netherlands) T Schoorel	3	1
(Spain) I Cervantes Huegun	6	6
WC	(Spain) T Robredo	6	2	6
(Italy) M Viola	4	6	4

Semifinals
(Spain) I Cervantes Huegun	4	2
WC	(Spain) T Robredo	6	6

=== Bottom half ===
First round
8	(Slovenia) G Žemlja	7	7
(Argentina) G Pella	5	6^{6}
Q	(Colombia) A González	4	6	6
(Spain) I Navarro	6	0	2
(Brazil) T Alves	3	2
Q	(United States) D Kosakowski	6	6
(Belgium) M Authom	6	3	3
3	(Portugal) F Gil	3	6	6
5	(Croatia) A Veić	6	6
WC	(Italy) G Naso	3	4
(Brazil) J Silva	1	5
Q	(Germany) D Meffert	6	7
(Spain) J Martí	6	0	2
(Argentina) D Junqueira	1	6	6
(Portugal) G Elias	7^{8}	6
2	(Italy) P Lorenzi	6^{6}	3

Second round
8	(Slovenia) G Žemlja	0	3
Q	(Colombia) A González	6	6
Q	(United States) D Kosakowski	6	6
3	(Portugal) F Gil	3	4
5	(Croatia) A Veić	7	6^{4}	5
Q	(Germany) D Meffert	5	7^{7}	7
(Argentina) D Junqueira	6^{3}	6	1
(Portugal) G Elias	7^{7}	3	6

Quarterfinals
Q	(Colombia) A González	7^{7}	7^{7}
Q	(United States) D Kosakowski	6^{3}	6^{1}
Q	(Germany) D Meffert	4	6^{9}
(Portugal) G Elias	6	7^{11}

Semifinals
Q	(Colombia) A González	7	4	3
(Portugal) G Elias	5	6	6
