= 2015 Città di Caltanissetta =

- Date: 8–14 June
- Edition: 17th
- Draw: 32S / 16D
- Prize money: $64,000+H
- Surface: Clay
- Location: Caltanissetta, Italy

Champions

Singles
- (Sweden) Elias Ymer

Doubles
- (Argentina) Guido Andreozzi / (Argentina) Guillermo Durán
← 2014 ·	Città di Caltanissetta	· 2016 →

The 2015 Città di Caltanissetta was a professional tennis tournament played on clay courts. It was the 17th edition of the tournament which was part of the 2015 ATP Challenger Tour. It took place in Caltanissetta, Italy between 8 and 14 June 2015.

== Singles main-draw entrants ==
=== Seeds ===
Country	Player	Rank^{1}	Seed
ESP	Albert Ramos Viñolas	63	1
ITA	Paolo Lorenzi	86	2
COL	Alejandro González	105	3
ARG	Guido Pella	113	4
ARG	Máximo González	114	5
ITA	Marco Cecchinato	122	6
USA	Bjorn Fratangelo	149	7
POR	Gastão Elias	152	8
BRA	Guilherme Clezar	172	9

- ^{1} Rankings are as of May 25, 2015.

=== Other entrants ===
The following players received wildcards into the singles main draw:

- (Italy) Salvatore Caruso
- (Italy) Federico Gaio
- (Italy) Gianluigi Quinzi
- (Italy) Stefano Travaglia

The following players received entry from the qualifying draw:

- (Colombia) Nicolás Barrientos
- (France) Quentin Halys
- (Chile) Gonzalo Lama
- (Argentina) Juan Ignacio Londero

The following players received entry as a lucky loser into the main draw:

- (Peru) Duilio Beretta

== Doubles main-draw entrants ==
=== Seeds ===
Country	Player	Country	Player	Rank^{1}	Seed
GER	Gero Kretschmer	GER	Alexander Satschko	204	1
ARG	Guido Andreozzi	ARG	Guillermo Durán	233	2
ROU	Costin Pavăl	ROU	Adrian Ungur	272	3
TPE	Lee Hsin-han	ITA	Alessandro Motti	310	4

- ^{1} Rankings as of May 25, 2015.

=== Other entrants ===
The following pairs received wildcards into the doubles main draw:

- (Italy) Gianluigi Quinzi / (Italy) Stefano Travaglia
- (Italy) Alessio di Mauro / (Italy) Nicolò Schilirò
- (Italy) Salvatore Caruso / (Italy) Federico Gaio

The following pairs used protected ranking to gain entry into the doubles main draw:

- (United States) James Cerretani / (Australia) Adam Hubble

== Champions ==
=== Singles ===
- (Sweden) Elias Ymer def. (United States) Bjorn Fratangelo 6–3, 6–2

=== Doubles ===
- (Argentina) Guido Andreozzi / (Argentina) Guillermo Durán def. (Chinese Taipei) Lee Hsin-han / (Italy) Alessandro Motti 6–3, 6–2
