= 2016 Città di Caltanissetta =

- Date: 4 – 12 June
- Edition: 18th
- Draw: 32S / 16D
- Prize money: €106,500 +H
- Surface: Clay
- Location: Caltanissetta, Italy

Champions

Singles
- (Italy) Paolo Lorenzi

Doubles
- (Argentina) Guido Andreozzi / (Argentina) Andrés Molteni
| ← 2015 · | Città di Caltanissetta | · 2017 → |

The 2016 Città di Caltanissetta was a professional tennis tournament played on clay courts. It was the 18th edition of the tournament which was part of the 2016 ATP Challenger Tour. It took place in Caltanissetta, Italy between 4 and 12 June 2016.

== Singles main-draw entrants ==
=== Seeds ===
| Country | Player | Rank^{1} | Seed |
|---|---|---|---|
| ITA | Paolo Lorenzi | 54 | 1 |
| ARG | Facundo Bagnis | 99 | 2 |
| SWE | Elias Ymer | 118 | 3 |
| NED | Thiemo de Bakker | 120 | 4 |
| COL | Santiago Giraldo | 122 | 5 |
| COL | Alejandro González | 142 | 6 |
| ESP | Daniel Gimeno Traver | 160 | 7 |
| SRB | Peđa Krstin | 168 | 8 |

- ^{1} Rankings are as of May 30, 2016.

=== Other entrants ===
The following players received wildcards into the singles main draw:

- (Italy) Matteo Donati
- (Italy) Omar Giacalone
- (Italy) Paolo Lorenzi
- (Italy) Gianluigi Quinzi

The following player received entry into the singles main draw with a protected ranking:

- (Germany) Julian Reister

The following players received entry from the qualifying draw:

- (Slovakia) Filip Horanský
- (Chile) Nicolás Jarry
- (Italy) Antonio Massara
- (India) Sumit Nagal
