= 2012 Città di Caltanissetta =

- Date: 4–10 June
- Edition: 14th
- Surface: Clay
- Location: Caltanissetta, Italy

Champions

Singles
- (Spain) Tommy Robredo

Doubles
- (Uruguay) Marcel Felder / (Croatia) Antonio Veić
← 2011 ·	Città di Caltanissetta	· 2013 →

The 2012 Città di Caltanissetta was a professional tennis tournament played on clay courts. It was the 14th edition of the tournament which was part of the 2012 ATP Challenger Tour. It took place in Caltanissetta, Italy between 4 and 10 June 2012.

== Singles main draw entrants ==
=== Seeds ===
Country	Player	Rank^{1}	Seed
COL	Alejandro Falla	52	1
ITA	Paolo Lorenzi	86	2
POR	Frederico Gil	107	3
ESP	Roberto Bautista Agut	116	4
CRO	Antonio Veić	119	5
BRA	Rogério Dutra da Silva	121	6
ESP	Daniel Gimeno Traver	125	7
SVN	Grega Žemlja	129	8

- ^{1} Rankings are as of May 28, 2012.

=== Other entrants ===
The following players received wildcards into the singles main draw:

- (Italy) Marco Cecchinato
- (Colombia) Alejandro Falla
- (Italy) Gianluca Naso
- (Spain) Tommy Robredo

The following players received entry from the qualifying draw:

- (Colombia) Alejandro González
- (United States) Daniel Kosakowski
- (Germany) Dominik Meffert
- (Serbia) Boris Pašanski

== Champions ==
=== Singles ===
- (Spain) Tommy Robredo def. (Portugal) Gastão Elias, 6–3, 6–2

=== Doubles ===
- (Uruguay) Marcel Felder / (Croatia) Antonio Veić def. (Spain) Daniel Gimeno Traver / (Spain) Iván Navarro, 5–7, 7–6^{(7–5)}, [10–6]
