= 2013 Pekao Szczecin Open – Doubles =

Doubles
- 2013 Pekao Szczecin Open

Final
- Champions: (United Kingdom) Ken Skupski (United Kingdom) Neal Skupski
- Runners-up: (Italy) Andrea Arnaboldi (Italy) Alessandro Giannessi
- Score: 6–4, 1–6, [10–7]

Events
Singles	Doubles
- Pekao Szczecin Open

Andre Begemann and Martin Emmrich were the defending champions, but chose not to compete.
British team Ken Skupski and Neal Skupski outlasted the Italian team of Andrea Arnaboldi and Alessandro Giannessi to claim the title in three sets 6–4, 1–6, [10–7].

== Seeds ==
1. (Germany) Dominik Meffert / (Austria) Philipp Oswald (quarterfinals)
2. (Germany) Dustin Brown / (Australia) Rameez Junaid (semifinals)
3. (United Kingdom) Ken Skupski / (United Kingdom) Neal Skupski (champions)
4. (Serbia) Nikola Ćirić / (Serbia) Goran Tošić (first round)

== Draw ==
Key

- Q = Qualifier
- WC = Wild card
- LL = Lucky loser
- Alt = Alternate
- ITF = ITF entry
- PR = Protected ranking
- SR = Special ranking
- SE = Special exempt
- JE = Junior exempt
- JR = Junior Accelerator Programme entrant
- CO = College Accelerator Programme entrant
- NG = Next Gen Accelerator Program entrant
- w/o = Walkover
- r = Retired
- d = Defaulted

=== Draw ===
First round
1	(Germany) D Meffert (Austria) P Oswald	6	6
(Canada) S Diez (Spain) P Riba	3	4
(Netherlands) S Fransen (Netherlands) W Koolhof	2	2
(Germany) S Greul (Italy) A Motti	6	6
3	(United Kingdom) K Skupski (United Kingdom) N Skupski	7	6
WC	(Poland) K Majchrzak (Poland) J Zieliński	5	0
(United States) V Mirzadeh (United States) D Zivkovic	2	4
(Ukraine) D Molchanov (Germany) T Puetz	6	6
(Italy) M Cecchinato (Italy) A Di Mauro	1	7	[6]
WC	(Poland) Piotr Gadomski (Poland) M Gawron	6	5	[10]
(Italy) A Arnaboldi (Italy) A Giannessi	4	6	[10]
4	(Serbia) N Ćirić (Serbia) G Tošić	6	3	[5]
(Italy) M Crugnola (Italy) P Starace	6	7^{8}
WC	(Poland) A Kapaś (Poland) G Panfil	4	6^{6}
(Czech Republic) J Mertl (Ukraine) O Nedovyesov	6	3	[5]
2	(Germany) D Brown (Australia) R Junaid	3	6	[10]

Quarterfinals
1	(Germany) D Meffert (Austria) P Oswald	6	4	[7]
(Germany) S Greul (Italy) A Motti	3	6	[10]
3	(United Kingdom) K Skupski (United Kingdom) N Skupski	6	6
(Ukraine) D Molchanov (Germany) T Puetz	2	0
WC	(Poland) P Gadomski (Poland) M Gawron	2	3
(Italy) A Arnaboldi (Italy) A Giannessi	6	6
(Italy) M Crugnola (Italy) P Starace	3	4
2	(Germany) D Brown (Australia) R Junaid	6	6

Semifinals
(Germany) S Greul (Italy) A Motti	3	4
3	(United Kingdom) K Skupski (United Kingdom) N Skupski	6	6
(Italy) A Arnaboldi (Italy) A Giannessi	6	6
2	(Germany) D Brown (Australia) R Junaid	4	2

Final
3	(United Kingdom) K Skupski (United Kingdom) N Skupski	6	1	[10]
(Italy) A Arnaboldi (Italy) A Giannessi	4	6	[7]
