= 2014 Città di Caltanissetta =

- Date: 9–15 June
- Edition: 16th
- Draw: 32S / 16D
- Prize money: $64,000+H
- Surface: Clay
- Location: Caltanissetta, Italy

Champions

Singles
- (Spain) Pablo Carreño

Doubles
- (Italy) Daniele Bracciali / (Italy) Potito Starace
← 2013 ·	Città di Caltanissetta	· 2015 →

The 2014 Città di Caltanissetta was a professional tennis tournament played on clay courts. It was the 16th edition of the tournament which was part of the 2014 ATP Challenger Tour. It took place in Caltanissetta, Italy between 9 and 15 June 2014.

== Singles main-draw entrants ==
=== Seeds ===
Country	Player	Rank^{1}	Seed
ESP	Pablo Carreño	68	1
ESP	Pablo Andújar	78	2
ESP	Pere Riba	84	3
ITA	Filippo Volandri	99	4
ESP	Albert Ramos	115	5
TUN	Malek Jaziri	116	6
URU	Pablo Cuevas	136	7
ARG	Facundo Bagnis	143	8

- ^{1} Rankings are as of May 26, 2014.

=== Other entrants ===
The following players received wildcards into the singles main draw:

- (Italy) Salvatore Caruso
- (Italy) Matteo Donati
- (Italy) Claudio Fortuna
- (Italy) Gianluca Naso

The following players received entry from the qualifying draw:

- (Italy) Claudio Grassi
- (Sweden) Christian Lindell
- (Sweden) Markus Eriksson
- (Germany) Alexander Zverev

== Doubles main-draw entrants ==
=== Seeds ===
Country	Player	Country	Player	Rank^{1}	Seed
ITA	Daniele Bracciali	ITA	Potito Starace	204	1
GER	Frank Moser	GER	Alexander Satschko	233	2
ITA	Riccardo Ghedin	ITA	Claudio Grassi	272	3
ARG	Facundo Bagnis	PER	Sergio Galdós	310	4

- ^{1} Rankings as of May 26, 2014.

=== Other entrants ===
The following pairs received wildcards into the doubles main draw:

- (Italy) Omar Giacalone / (Italy) Gianluca Naso
- (Italy) Salvatore Caruso / (Italy) Walter Trusendi
- (Chile) Nicolás Jarry / (Germany) Alexander Zverev

== Champions ==
=== Singles ===
- (Spain) Pablo Carreño Busta def. (Argentina) Facundo Bagnis, 4–6, 6–4, 6–1

=== Doubles ===
- (Italy) Daniele Bracciali / (Italy) Potito Starace def. (Spain) Pablo Carreño Busta / (Spain) Enrique López Pérez, 6–3, 6–3
