= 2010 Città di Caltanissetta =

- Date: March 15 – March 21
- Edition: 14th
- Location: Caltanissetta, Italy

Champions

Singles
- (Netherlands) Robin Haase

Doubles
- (Spain) David Marrero / (Spain) Santiago Ventura
← 2009 ·	Città di Caltanissetta	· 2011 →

The 2010 Città di Caltanissetta was a professional tennis tournament played on outdoor red clay courts. It was part of the 2010 ATP Challenger Tour. It took place in Caltanissetta, Italy between 15 and 21 March 2010.

== ATP entrants ==
=== Seeds ===
Nationality	Player	Ranking*	Seeding
ESP	Santiago Ventura	91	1
ITA	Paolo Lorenzi	92	2
ESP	Pere Riba	117	3
ESP	Iván Navarro	123	4
ESP	Rubén Ramírez Hidalgo	148	5
SLO	Grega Žemlja	149	6
ESP	David Marrero	150	7
CZE	Ivo Minář	151	8

- Rankings are as of March 8, 2010.

=== Other entrants ===
The following players received wildcards into the singles main draw:

- (Italy) Francesco Aldi
- (Italy) Alessio di Mauro
- (Italy) Paolo Lorenzi
- (Italy) Matteo Trevisan

The following players received entry from the qualifying draw:

- (Argentina) Martín Alund
- (Italy) Daniele Giorgini
- (Brazil) Leonardo Kirche
- (Croatia) Franko Škugor

The following player received special exempt into the main draw:

- (Japan) Yūichi Sugita

== Champions ==
=== Singles ===
(Netherlands) Robin Haase def. (Italy) Matteo Trevisan, 7–5, 6–3

=== Doubles ===
(Spain) David Marrero / (Spain) Santiago Ventura def. (Belarus) Uladzimir Ignatik / (Slovakia) Martin Kližan, 7–6(3), 6–4
