= 2011 Città di Caltanissetta =

- Date: 21–27 March
- Edition: 13th
- Location: Caltanissetta, Italy

Champions

Singles
- (Austria) Andreas Haider-Maurer

Doubles
- (Italy) Daniele Bracciali / (Italy) Simone Vagnozzi
← 2010 ·	Città di Caltanissetta	· 2012 →

The 2011 Città di Caltanissetta was a professional tennis tournament played on clay courts. It was the thirteenth edition of the tournament which was part of the 2011 ATP Challenger Tour. It took place in Caltanissetta, Italy between 21 and 27 March 2011.

== Singles main draw entrants ==
=== Seeds ===
Country	Player	Rank^{1}	Seed
ITA	Filippo Volandri	79	1
GER	Denis Gremelmayr	107	2
AUT	Andreas Haider-Maurer	115	3
FRA	Benoît Paire	117	4
GER	Simon Greul	123	5
ITA	Alessio di Mauro	147	6
GER	Bastian Knittel	159	7
FRA	David Guez	166	8

- Rankings are as of March 7, 2011.

=== Other entrants ===
The following players received wildcards into the singles main draw:

- (Italy) Daniele Bracciali
- (Italy) Francesco Aldi
- (Italy) Stefano Galvani
- (Italy) Daniele Giorgini

The following players received entry from the qualifying draw:

- (Italy) Enrico Burzi
- (Slovenia) Aljaž Bedene
- (Italy) Filippo Leonardi
- (Netherlands) Antal van der Duim

== Champions ==
=== Singles ===
(Austria) Andreas Haider-Maurer def. (Italy) Matteo Viola, 6–1, 7–6(1)

=== Doubles ===
(Italy) Daniele Bracciali / (Italy) Simone Vagnozzi def. (Italy) Daniele Giorgini / (Romania) Adrian Ungur, 3–6, 7–6(2), [10–7]
