= 2018 Città di Caltanissetta =

- Date: 11–17 June
- Edition: 20th
- Draw: 32S / 16D
- Surface: Clay
- Location: Caltanissetta, Italy

Champions

Singles
- (Spain) Jaume Munar

Doubles
- (Italy) Federico Gaio / (Italy) Andrea Pellegrino
← 2017 ·	Città di Caltanissetta

The 2018 Città di Caltanissetta was a professional tennis tournament played on clay courts. It was the 20th edition of the tournament which was a part of the 2018 ATP Challenger Tour. It took place in Caltanissetta, Italy between 11 and 17 June 2018.

== Singles main-draw entrants ==
=== Seeds ===
Country	Player	Rank^{1}	Seed
ITA	Paolo Lorenzi	74	1
URU	Pablo Cuevas	75	2
CZE	Jiří Veselý	80	3
~~JPN~~	~~Taro Daniel~~	~~82~~	~~4~~
SRB	Laslo Đere	101	5
ARG	Guido Andreozzi	108	6
BRA	Thiago Monteiro	123	7
~~ITA~~	~~Stefano Travaglia~~	~~143~~	~~8~~

- ^{1} Rankings are as of 28 May 2018.

=== Other entrants ===
The following players received wildcards into the singles main draw:

- (Italy) Filippo Baldi
- (Spain) Alejandro Davidovich Fokina
- (Italy) Omar Giacalone
- (Italy) Gian Marco Moroni

The following players received entry from the qualifying draw:

- (Italy) Marco Bortolotti
- (Italy) Federico Gaio
- (Germany) Marc Sieber
- (Serbia) Miljan Zekić

The following players received entry as lucky losers:

- (Uruguay) Martín Cuevas
- (France) Maxime Janvier

== Champions ==
=== Singles ===
- (Spain) Jaume Munar def. (Italy) Matteo Donati 6–2, 7–6^{(7–2)}.

=== Doubles ===
- (Italy) Federico Gaio / (Italy) Andrea Pellegrino def. (Slovenia) Blaž Rola / (Czech Republic) Jiří Veselý 7–6^{(7–4)}, 7–6^{(7–5)}.
