= 2016 Città di Caltanissetta – Singles =

Singles
- 2016 Città di Caltanissetta

Final
- Champion: (Italy) Paolo Lorenzi
- Runner-up: (Italy) Matteo Donati
- Score: 6–3, 4–6, 7–6^{(9–7)}

Events
| Singles | Doubles |
- Città di Caltanissetta

Elias Ymer was the defending champion but lost in the second round to Alessandro Giannessi.

Paolo Lorenzi won the title after defeating Matteo Donati 6–3, 4–6, 7–6^{(9–7)} in the final.

== Seeds ==
1. (Italy) Paolo Lorenzi (champion)
2. (Argentina) Facundo Bagnis (second round)
3. (Sweden) Elias Ymer (second round)
4. (Netherlands) Thiemo de Bakker (first round)
5. (Colombia) Santiago Giraldo (second round)
6. (Colombia) Alejandro González (first round)
7. (Spain) Daniel Gimeno Traver (first round)
8. (Serbia) Peđa Krstin (first round)

== Draw ==
Key

- Q = Qualifier
- WC = Wild card
- LL = Lucky loser
- Alt = Alternate
- ITF = ITF entry
- PR = Protected ranking
- SR = Special ranking
- SE = Special exempt
- JE = Junior exempt
- JR = Junior Accelerator Programme entrant
- CO = College Accelerator Programme entrant
- NG = Next Gen Accelerator Program entrant
- w/o = Walkover
- r = Retired
- d = Defaulted

=== Finals ===
Semifinals
1/WC | (Italy) Paolo Lorenzi | 6 | 7
(Italy) Alessandro Giannessi | 4 | 5
(Argentina) Guido Andreozzi | 6 | 5 | 2
WC | (Italy) Matteo Donati | 4 | 7 | 6

Final
1/WC | (Italy) Paolo Lorenzi | 6 | 4 | 7^{9}
WC | (Italy) Matteo Donati | 3 | 6 | 6^{7}

=== Top half ===
First round
1/WC | (Italy) P Lorenzi | 7^{7} | 6
(Portugal) FF Silva | 6^{4} | 4
(Serbia) L Đere | 7^{9} | 6^{2} | 6
(Italy) F Volandri | 6^{7} | 7^{7} | 2
(Chile) G Lama | 6 | 6
Q | (Slovakia) F Horanský | 3 | 4
(Italy) S Caruso | 6 | 6
6 | (Colombia) A González | 2 | 4
3 | (Sweden) E Ymer | 6 | 6
(China) Y Bai | 2 | 3
Q | (Chile) N Jarry | 6 | 5 | 4
(Italy) A Giannessi | 4 | 7 | 6
(Serbia) M Tepavac | 6 | 6
Q | (Italy) Antonio Massara | 4 | 4
(El Salvador) M Arévalo | 7 | 6
8 | (Serbia) P Krstin | 5 | 1

Second round
1/WC | (Italy) P Lorenzi | 4 | 7^{7} | 6
(Serbia) L Đere | 6 | 6^{4} | 3
(Chile) G Lama | 6 | 6
(Italy) S Caruso | 2 | 2
3 | (Sweden) E Ymer | 4 | 4
(Italy) A Giannessi | 6 | 6
(Serbia) M Tepavac | 4 | 3
(El Salvador) M Arévalo | 6 | 6

Quarterfinals
1/WC | (Italy) P Lorenzi | 6 | 6
(Chile) G Lama | 2 | 4
(Italy) A Giannessi | 6 | 6
(El Salvador) M Arévalo | 4 | 1

Semifinals
1/WC | (Italy) P Lorenzi | 6 | 7
(Italy) A Giannessi | 4 | 5

=== Bottom half ===
First round
7 | (Spain) D Gimeno Traver | 6^{6} | 6^{5}
WC | (Italy) Omar Giacalone | 7^{8} | 7^{7}
(Romania) A Ungur | 3 | 7 | 4
(Spain) E López Pérez | 6 | 5 | 6
(Argentina) G Andreozzi | 6 | 6
Q | (India) S Nagal | 2 | 4
PR | (Germany) J Reister | 6 | 4 | 7^{7}
4 | (Netherlands) T de Bakker | 3 | 6 | 6^{5}
5 | (Colombia) S Giraldo | 6 | 6
(Italy) L Giustino | 4 | 1
WC | (Italy) M Donati | 6 | 5 | 7^{8}
(Serbia) M Zekić | 3 | 7 | 6^{6}
(Brazil) G Clezar | 2 | 6 | 6^{6}
WC | (Italy) G Quinzi | 6 | 1 | 7^{8}
(Italy) A Arnaboldi | 5 | 5
2 | (Argentina) F Bagnis | 7 | 7

Second round
WC | (Italy) O Giacalone | 2 | 3
(Spain) E López Pérez | 6 | 6
(Argentina) G Andreozzi | 3 | 6 | 6
PR | (Germany) J Reister | 6 | 3 | 3
5 | (Colombia) S Giraldo | 2 | 6 | 6^{4}
WC | (Italy) M Donati | 6 | 3 | 7^{7}
WC | (Italy) G Quinzi | 6 | 2 | 6
2 | (Argentina) F Bagnis | 4 | 6 | 2

Quarterfinals
(Spain) E López Pérez | 2 | 4
(Argentina) G Andreozzi | 6 | 6
WC | (Italy) M Donati | 6 | 3 | 6
WC | (Italy) G Quinzi | 4 | 6 | 4

Semifinals
(Argentina) G Andreozzi | 6 | 5 | 2
WC | (Italy) M Donati | 4 | 7 | 6
