= Daniel Kosakowski =

American tennis player (born 1992)

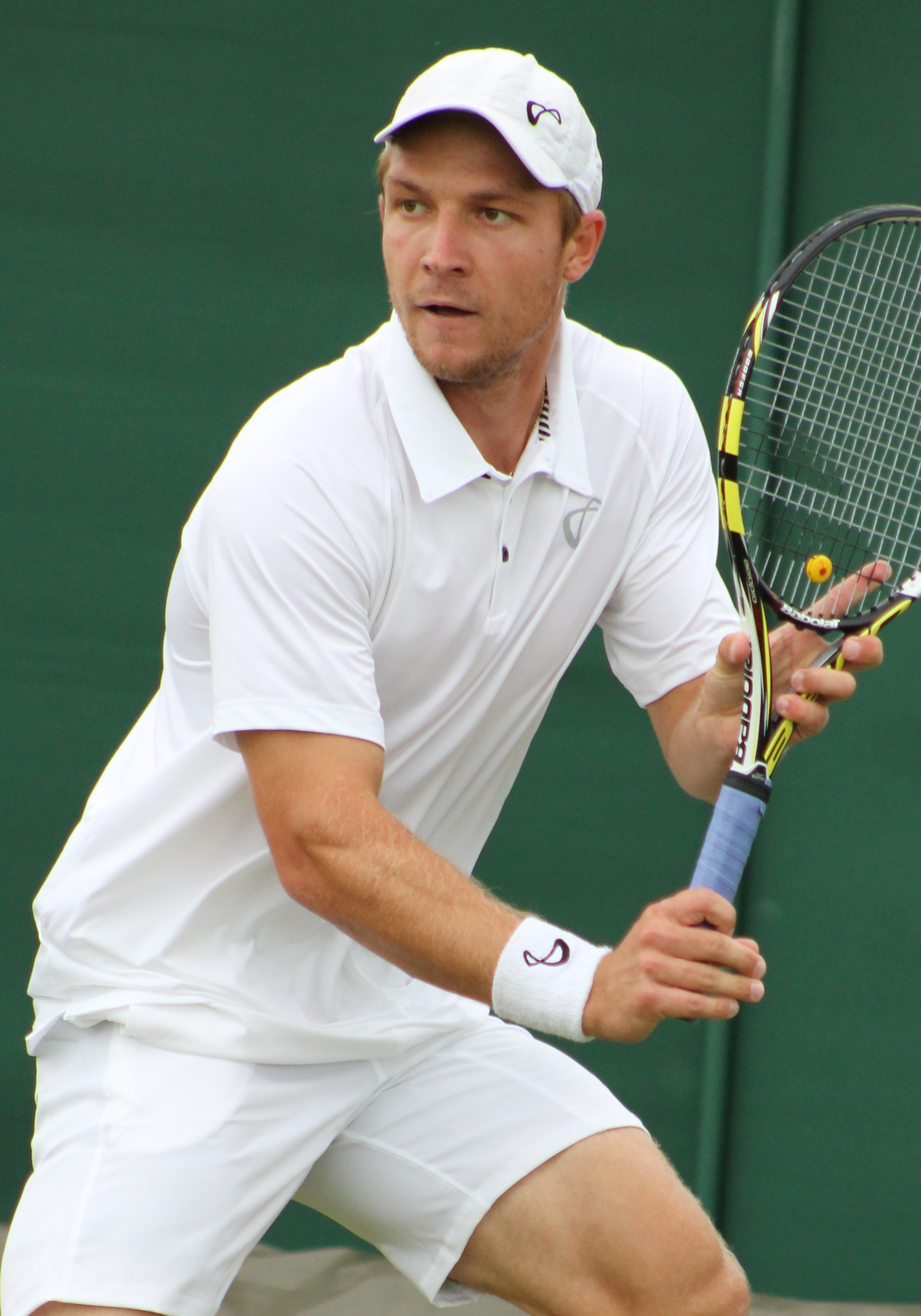
- Kosakowski in Wimbledon qualifying, 2014
- Country (sports): United States
- Born: February 21, 1992 (age 33) Huntington Park, California
- Height: 6 ft 1 in (1.85 m)
- Turned pro: 2011
- Retired: 2014
- Plays: Right-handed (one-handed backhand)
- College: UCLA
- Prize money: $132,841

Singles
- Career record: 1–2
- Career titles: 0
- Highest ranking: No. 230 (April 1, 2013)

Grand Slam singles results
- Australian Open: Q3 (2014)
- Wimbledon: Q2 (2014)

Doubles
- Career record: 0–0
- Career titles: 0
- Highest ranking: No. 486 (30 July 2012)
- Last updated on: December 19, 2019.

Daniel Kosakowski (born February 21, 1992) is a retired professional American tennis player.

He played for the University of California, Los Angeles and was named Pacific-10 Conference 2011 Freshman Player of the Year. He resides in Downey, CA.

Kosakowski spent the first two years of his professional tennis career playing in tournaments based in California, reaching the final of the USA F25 event in September 2010, eventually losing to Chris Guccione in straight sets. The following year, in June 2011, he won the USA F13 tournament, beating Steve Johnson, 6–4, 2–6, 6–3 in the final.

He played in the 2011 Farmers Classic as a qualifier and defeated Tim Smyczek, 2–6, 6–1, 6–3 in the first round. In the second round, he lost to the eventual tournament's singles champion Ernests Gulbis, 2–6, 4–6.

In June 2012, Kosakowski travelled to Italy to play in his first professional tournament outside the United States, competing as a qualifier in the Città di Caltanissetta. After beating Omar Giacalone in three sets in his first qualifier, Kosakowski knocked out both Philipp Oswald and Laurent Rochette to qualify for the first round of the tournament. He then beat Brazilian Thiago Alves in straight sets, before shocking third seed Frederico Gil, 6–3, 6–4, to progress to the quarterfinals of the event where he lost to fellow qualifier Alejandro Gonzalez.
