= 2009 Città di Caltanissetta =

- Date: March 16 – March 22
- Edition: 13th
- Location: Caltanissetta, Italy

Champions

Singles
- (Netherlands) Jesse Huta Galung

Doubles
- (Argentina) Juan Pablo Brzezicki / (Spain) David Marrero
← 2008 ·	Città di Caltanissetta	· 2010 →

The 2009 Città di Caltanissetta was a professional tennis tournament played on outdoor red clay courts. It was part of the 2009 ATP Challenger Tour. It took place in Caltanissetta, Italy between 16 and 22 March 2009.

== Singles entrants ==
=== Seeds ===
Nationality	Player	Ranking*	Seeding
FRA	Adrian Mannarino	128	1
ITA	Tomas Tenconi	155	2
BEL	Xavier Malisse	165	3
KAZ	Yuri Schukin	180	4
DEN	Kristian Pless	183	5
NED	Jesse Huta Galung	184	6
FRA	Éric Prodon	190	7
ARG	Juan Pablo Brzezicki	196	8

- Rankings are as of March 9, 2009.

=== Other entrants ===
The following players received wildcards into the singles main draw:

- (Italy) Daniele Bracciali
- (France) Adrian Mannarino
- (Italy) Davide Sanguinetti
- (Italy) Tomas Tenconi

The following players received entry from the qualifying draw:

- (Italy) Francesco Aldi
- (Netherlands) Thiemo de Bakker
- (Poland) Jerzy Janowicz
- (Netherlands) Nick van der Meer

== Champions ==
=== Men's singles ===
(Netherlands) Jesse Huta Galung def. (Netherlands) Thiemo de Bakker, 6–2, 6–3

=== Men's doubles ===
(Argentina) Juan Pablo Brzezicki / (Spain) David Marrero def. (Italy) Daniele Bracciali / (Italy) Simone Vagnozzi, 7–6(5), 6–3
