= Alessandro Giannessi =

Italian tennis player (born 1990)

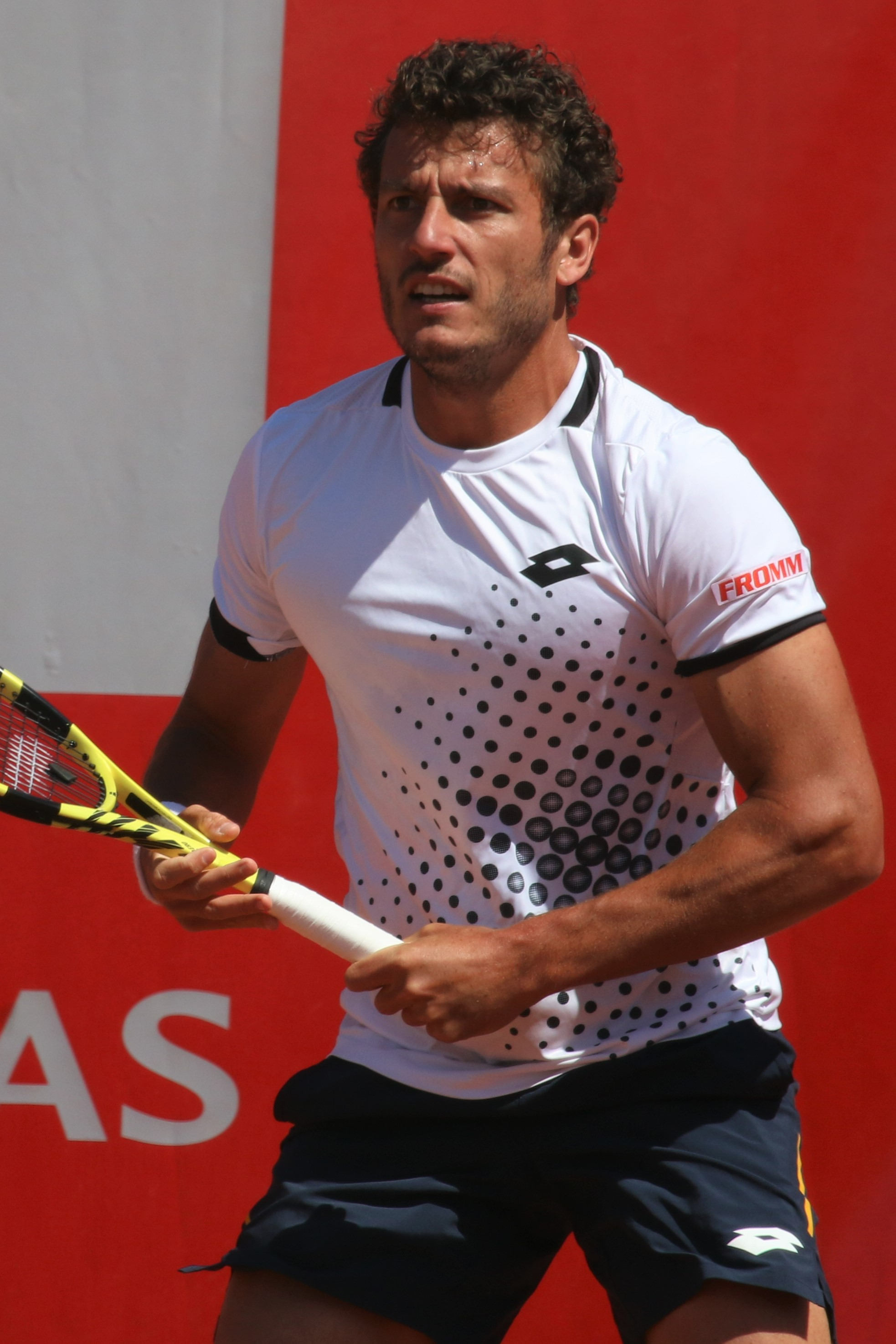
- Giannessi at the 2022 BNP Paribas Primrose Bordeaux
- Country (sports): Italy
- Born: 30 May 1990 (age 36) La Spezia, Italy
- Height: 1.85 m (6 ft 1 in)
- Turned pro: 2008
- Retired: 2024
- Plays: Left-handed (two-handed backhand)
- Coach: Flavio Cipolla
- Prize money: $ 1,419,042

Singles
- Career record: 13–23
- Career titles: 0
- Highest ranking: No. 84 (24 July 2017)

Grand Slam singles results
- Australian Open: Q3 (2022)
- French Open: 1R (2021, 2022)
- Wimbledon: Q3 (2018)
- US Open: 2R (2016)

Doubles
- Career record: 2–8
- Career titles: 0
- Highest ranking: No. 171 (14 October 2013)

Grand Slam doubles results
- US Open: 2R (2017)
- Last updated on: 20 January 2024.

Alessandro Giannessi (born 30 May 1990) is an Italian former professional tennis player. On 24 July 2017 he reached his highest ATP singles ranking of world No. 84 while his best doubles ranking was No. 171 on 14 October 2013.

== Career ==
Giannessi made his Grand Slam debut at the 2016 US Open as a qualifier where he recorded his first Major win defeating Denis Kudla in five sets.

Giannessi was a singles semifinalist at the 2017 Croatia Open Umag.

At the 2021 French Open, he made his debut at this Major after qualifying for the main draw with a win over Francisco Cerundolo.

At the 2022 French Open, although he lost in the third round of qualifying to Sebastian Ofner — he entered the main draw as a lucky loser.

He won his fourth Challenger title and first since 2019 at the 2023 Zadar Open this time with a win over Sebastian Ofner.

Giannessi announced his retirement from professional tennis in August 2024.

== Challenger and Futures finals ==
=== Singles: 23 (10–13) ===
Legend (singles) ATP Challenger Tour (4–8) ITF Futures Tour (6–5)	Titles by surface Hard (0–2) Clay (10–11) Grass (0–0) Carpet (0–0)

Result	W–L	Date	Tournament	Tier	Surface	Opponent	Score
Win	1–0	Nov 2010	Spain F40, Madrid	Futures	Clay	(Spain) Javier Martí	7–5, 6–2
Loss	1–1	Mar 2011	Turkey F8, Antalya	Futures	Hard	(Romania) Andrei Mlendea	3–6, 3–6
Loss	1–2	Apr 2011	Italy F4, Rome	Futures	Clay	(Italy) Daniele Giorgini	5–7, 1–6
Win	2–2	May 2011	Italy F10, Aosta	Futures	Clay	(Colombia) Eduardo Struvay	6–4, 7–6^{(9–7)}
Win	3–2	Jun 2011	Italy F15, Viterbo	Futures	Clay	(Slovenia) Janez Semrajc	6–3, 6–0
Loss	3–3	Jul 2011	Italy F20, La Spezia	Futures	Clay	(Austria) Philipp Oswald	3–6, 6–4, 2–6
Loss	3–4	Aug 2011	Italy F22, Appiano	Futures	Clay	(Argentina) Andrés Molteni	5–7, 4–6
Loss	3–5	Oct 2011	Napoli, Italy	Challenger	Clay	(Argentina) Leonardo Mayer	3–6, 4–6
Loss	3–6	May 2013	Napoli, Italy	Challenger	Clay	(Italy) Potito Starace	2–6, 0–2 ret.
Win	4–6	Aug 2013	Italy F19, La Spezia	Futures	Clay	(Italy) Daniele Giorgini	6–2, 6–3
Win	5–6	Jun 2015	Italy F12, Lodi	Futures	Clay	(Switzerland) Yann Marti	6–7^{(6–8)}, 7–5, 6–4
Loss	5–7	Jun 2015	Italy F13, Bergamo	Futures	Clay	(Italy) Gianluca Naso	6–4, 2–6, 6–7^{(3–7)}
Win	6–7	Jul 2015	Italy F17, Sassuolo	Futures	Clay	(Italy) Gianluca Naso	4–6, 6–3, 6–2
Loss	6–8	Jul 2015	San Benedetto, Italy	Challenger	Clay	(Spain) Albert Ramos Viñolas	2–6, 4–6
Win	7–8	Sep 2016	Szczecin, Poland	Challenger	Clay	(Germany) Dustin Brown	6–2, 6–3
Loss	7–9	Nov 2016	Ortisei, Italy	Challenger	Hard (i)	(Italy) Stefano Napolitano	4–6, 1–6
Loss	7–10	Apr 2017	Francavilla, Italy	Challenger	Clay	(Portugal) Pedro Sousa	3–6, 6–7^{(3-7)}
Loss	7–11	Jun 2017	Caltanissetta, Italy	Challenger	Clay	(Italy) Paolo Lorenzi	4–6, 2–6
Win	8–11	Sep 2018	Banja Luka, Bosnia and Herzegovina	Challenger	Clay	(Argentina) Carlos Berlocq	6–7^{(6–8)}, 6–4, 6–4
Win	9–11	Jun 2019	Vicenza, Italy	Challenger	Clay	(Italy) Filippo Baldi	7–5, 6–2
Loss	9–12	Jul 2019	San Benedetto, Italy	Challenger	Clay	(Argentina) Renzo Olivo	7–5, 6–7^{(4–7)}, 4–6
Loss	9–13	Apr 2022	Oeiras, Portugal	Challenger	Clay	(Portugal) Gastão Elias	6-7^{(4-7)}, 1-6
Win	10–13	Mar 2023	Zadar, Croatia	Challenger	Clay	(Austria) Sebastian Ofner	6–4, 5–7, 7–6^{(8–6)}

=== Doubles: 26 (7–19) ===
Legend (doubles) ATP Challenger Tour (1–9) ITF Futures Tour (6–10)	Titles by surface Hard (2–4) Clay (5–15) Grass (0–0) Carpet (0–0)

Result	W–L	Date	Tournament	Tier	Surface	Partner	Opponents	Score
Loss	0–1	Oct 2008	Italy F34, Quartu Sant'Elena	Futures	Hard	(Italy) Federico Gaio	(Italy) Fabio Colangelo (Italy) Matteo Volante	6–7^{(7–9)}, 1–6
Loss	0–2	Feb 2009	Italy F2, Trento	Futures	Hard (i)	(Italy) Davide Della Tommasina	(Italy) Leonardo Azzaro (Sweden) Filip Prpic	3–6, 1–6
Loss	0–3	Jul 2009	Italy F20, Modena	Futures	Clay	(Italy) Filippo Leonardi	(Belgium) Niels Desein (Belgium) Yannick Mertens	2–6, 1–6
Loss	0–4	Aug 2009	Italy F22, Avezzano	Futures	Clay	(Italy) Giorgio Portaluri	(Montenegro) Daniel Danilović (Montenegro) Goran Tošić	6–0, 1–6, [3–10]
Win	1–4	Aug 2009	Italy F25, Piombino	Futures	Hard	(Italy) Claudio Grassi	(France) Philippe de Bonnevie (Republic of Ireland) Colin O'Brien	6–1, 4–6, [10–5]
Loss	1–5	Sep 2009	Italy F28, Porto Torres	Futures	Hard	(Italy) Francesco Piccari	(Canada) Vasek Pospisil (United Kingdom) Marcus Willis	6–4, 3–6, [8–10]
Win	2–5	Sep 2009	Italy F29, Alghero	Futures	Hard	(Italy) Federico Gaio	(Canada) Vasek Pospisil (United Kingdom) Marcus Willis	6–2, 7–5
Loss	2–6	Mar 2010	Italy F1, Trento	Futures	Hard (i)	(Italy) Federico Gaio	(Belarus) Nikolai Fidirko (Austria) Nikolaus Moser	4–6, 4–6
Win	3–6	Jun 2010	Italy F11, Bergamo	Futures	Clay	(Denmark) Frederik Nielsen	(Italy) Stefano Ianni (Italy) Matteo Volante	6–4, 7–6^{(7–3)}
Win	4–6	Jun 2010	Italy F13, Padova	Futures	Clay	(Italy) Federico Torresi	(Italy) Paolo Beninca (Italy) Matteo Viola	6–1, 7–6^{(7–3)}
Win	5–6	Jul 2010	Italy F19, La Spezia	Futures	Clay	(Italy) Flavio Cipolla	(Italy) Thomas Fabbiano (Italy) Walter Trusendi	6–2, 7–6^{(9–7)}
Loss	5–7	Sep 2010	Italy F24, Trieste	Futures	Clay	(Italy) Marco Bortolotti	(Mexico) Luis Díaz Barriga (Mexico) Miguel Ángel Reyes-Varela	5–7, 3–6
Loss	5–8	Oct 2010	Croatia F7, Dubrovnik	Futures	Clay	(Austria) Bertram Steinberger	(Italy) Andrea Arnaboldi (United Kingdom) Morgan Phillips	4–6, 4–6
Loss	5–9	Jul 2011	Italy F20, La Spezia	Futures	Clay	(Italy) Walter Trusendi	(Italy) Davide Della Tommasina (Italy) Riccardo Sinicropi	6–7^{(3–7)}, 1–6
Win	6–9	Aug 2011	Italy F22, Appiano	Futures	Clay	(Italy) Stefano Ianni	(Argentina) Andrés Molteni (Argentina) Marco Trungelliti	6–2, 6–0
Loss	6–10	May 2013	Napoli, Italy	Challenger	Clay	(Kazakhstan) Andrey Golubev	(Italy) Stefano Ianni (Italy) Potito Starace	1–6, 3–6
Loss	6–11	Jun 2013	Caltanissetta, Italy	Challenger	Clay	(Italy) Potito Starace	(Germany) Dominik Meffert (Austria) Philipp Oswald	2–6, 3–6
Loss	6–12	Jun 2013	San Benedetto, Italy	Challenger	Clay	(Portugal) João Sousa	(France) Pierre-Hugues Herbert (France) Maxime Teixeira	4–6, 3–6
Win	7–12	Sep 2013	Meknes, Morocco	Challenger	Clay	(Italy) Gianluca Naso	(Spain) Gerard Granollers Pujol (Spain) Jordi Samper Montaña	7–5, 7–6^{(7–3)}
Loss	7–13	Sep 2013	Szczecin, Poland	Challenger	Clay	(Italy) Andrea Arnaboldi	(United Kingdom) Ken Skupski (United Kingdom) Neal Skupski	4–6, 6–1, [7–10]
Loss	7–14	Jul 2015	Padova, Italy	Challenger	Clay	(Italy) Federico Gaio	(Russia) Mikhail Elgin (Russia) Andrey Rublev	4–6, 6–7^{(4–7)}
Loss	7–15	Jul 2015	Italy F17, Sassuolo	Futures	Clay	(Italy) Matteo Volante	(Egypt) Mohamed Safwat (Austria) Tristan-Samuel Weissborn	6–4, 5–7, [8–10]
Loss	7–16	Sep 2015	Genova, Italy	Challenger	Clay	(Italy) Andrea Arnaboldi	(Argentina) Guillermo Durán (Argentina) Horacio Zeballos	5–7, 4–6
Loss	7–17	Sep 2015	Szczecin, Poland	Challenger	Clay	(Italy) Federico Gaio	(France) Tristan Lamasine (France) Fabrice Martin	3–6, 6–7^{(4–7)}
Loss	7–18	Jul 2016	Todi, Italy	Challenger	Clay	(Italy) Salvatore Caruso	(Brazil) Marcelo Demoliner (Brazil) Fabrício Neis	2–6, 6–3, [5–10]
Loss	7–19	Mar 2018	Punta del Este, Uruguay	Challenger	Clay	(Italy) Simone Bolelli	(Argentina) Facundo Bagnis (Uruguay) Ariel Behar	2–6, 6–7^{(7–9)}

== Singles performance timeline ==
Key
W	F	SF	QF	#R	RR	Q#	DNQ	A	NH

(W) winner; (F) finalist; (SF) semifinalist; (QF) quarterfinalist; (#R) rounds 4, 3, 2, 1; (RR) round-robin stage; (Q#) qualification round; (DNQ) did not qualify; (A) absent; (NH) not held; (SR) strike rate (events won / competed); (W–L) win–loss record.
To avoid confusion and double counting, these charts are updated at the conclusion of a tournament or when the player's participation has ended.

Tournament	2011	2012	2013	2014	2015	2016	2017	2018	2019	2020	2021	2022	W–L
Grand Slam tournaments
Australian Open	A	A	Q1	Q2	A	Q1	Q1	Q2	Q1	Q1	Q1	Q3	0–0
French Open	A	A	A	A	A	Q1	Q2	Q3	Q1	Q2	1R	1R	0–2
Wimbledon	A	Q2	A	A	A	Q1	Q1	Q3	Q1	NH	Q1	Q1	0–0
US Open	Q1	Q2	A	A	A	2R	1R	Q1	Q2	A	Q1	A	1–2
Win–loss	0–0	0–0	0–0	0–0	0–0	1–1	0–1	0–0	0–0	0–0	0–1	0–1	1–4
