= Città di Caltanissetta =

- 2017 Città di Caltanissetta

Defunct tennis tournament
- Event name: Città di Caltanissetta
- Location: Caltanissetta, Italy
- Venue: Tennis Club Caltanissetta "Villa Amedeo"
- Category: ATP Challenger Tour
- Surface: Clay
- Draw: 32S/24Q/16D
- Prize money: €127000+H
- Website: Website

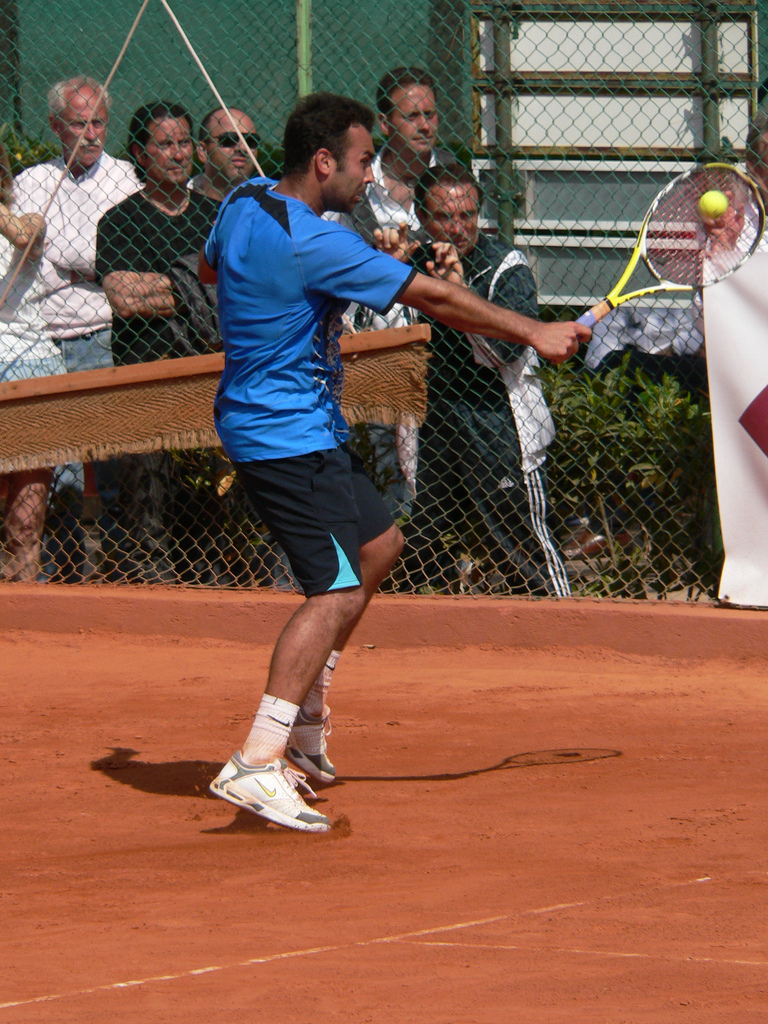
Frenchman Éric Prodon won the singles and the doubles (with Stéphane Huet) at the last edition of the tournament as a Satellite in 2004.

The Città di Caltanissetta was a professional tennis tournament played on outdoor red clay courts. It was part of the Association of Tennis Professionals (ATP) Challenger Tour. It was held annually in Caltanissetta, Italy, since 1999 (as a Satellite from 1999 to 2004, as a Futures from 2005 to 2008, and as a Challenger from 2009 until 2018).

== Past finals ==
=== Singles ===
Year	Champion	Runner-up	Score
2018	(Spain) Jaume Munar	(Italy) Matteo Donati	6–2, 7–6^{(7–2)}
2017	(Italy) Paolo Lorenzi	(Italy) Alessandro Giannessi	6–4, 6–2
2016	(Italy) Paolo Lorenzi	(Italy) Matteo Donati	6–3, 4–6, 7–6^{(9-7)}
2015	(Sweden) Elias Ymer	(United States) Bjorn Fratangelo	6–3, 6–2
2014	(Spain) Pablo Carreño	(Argentina) Facundo Bagnis	4–6, 6–4, 6–1
2013	(Serbia) Dušan Lajović	(Netherlands) Robin Haase	7–6^{(7–4)}, 6–3
2012	(Spain) Tommy Robredo	(Portugal) Gastão Elias	6–3, 6–2
2011	(Austria) Andreas Haider-Maurer	(Italy) Matteo Viola	6–1, 7–6^{(7–1)}
2010	(Netherlands) Robin Haase	(Italy) Matteo Trevisan	7–5, 6–3
2009	(Netherlands) Jesse Huta Galung	(Netherlands) Thiemo de Bakker	6–2, 6–3

=== Doubles ===
Year	Champions	Runners-up	Score
2018	(Italy) Federico Gaio (Italy) Andrea Pellegrino	(Slovenia) Blaž Rola (Czech Republic) Jiří Veselý	7–6^{(7–4)}, 7–6^{(7–5)}
2017	(United States) James Cerretani (United States) Max Schnur	(Ukraine) Denys Molchanov (Croatia) Franko Škugor	6–3, 3–6, [10–6]
2016	(Argentina) Guido Andreozzi (Argentina) Andrés Molteni	(Mexico) Miguel Ángel Reyes-Varela (El Salvador) Marcelo Arévalo	6–1, 6–2
2015	(Argentina) Guido Andreozzi (Argentina) Guillermo Durán	(Chinese Taipei) Lee Hsin-han (Italy) Alessandro Motti	6–3, 6–2
2014	(Italy) Daniele Bracciali (Italy) Potito Starace	(Spain) Pablo Carreño (Spain) Enrique López Pérez	6–3, 6–3
2013	(Germany) Dominik Meffert (Austria) Philipp Oswald	(Italy) Alessandro Giannessi (Italy) Potito Starace	6–2, 6–3
2012	(Uruguay) Marcel Felder (Croatia) Antonio Veić	(Spain) Daniel Gimeno Traver (Spain) Iván Navarro	5–7, 7–6^{(7–5)}, [10–6]
2011	(Italy) Daniele Bracciali (Italy) Simone Vagnozzi	(Italy) Daniele Giorgini (Romania) Adrian Ungur	3–6, 7–6^{(7–2)}, [10–7]
2010	(Spain) David Marrero (Spain) Santiago Ventura	(Belarus) Uladzimir Ignatik (Slovakia) Martin Kližan	7–6^{(7–3)}, 6–4
2009	(Argentina) Juan Pablo Brzezicki (Spain) David Marrero	(Italy) Daniele Bracciali (Italy) Simone Vagnozzi	7–6^{(7–5)}, 6–3
