= 2014 Prosperita Open – Doubles =

Doubles
- 2014 Prosperita Open

Final
- Champions: (Russia) Andrey Kuznetsov (Spain) Adrián Menéndez-Maceiras
- Runners-up: (Italy) Alessandro Motti (Italy) Matteo Viola
- Score: 4–6, 6–3, [10–8]

Events
Singles	Doubles
← 2013 ·	Prosperita Open	· 2015 →

Steve Darcis and Olivier Rochus were the defending champions, but decided not to compete.

Andrey Kuznetsov and Adrián Menéndez-Maceiras won the title, defeating Alessandro Motti and Matteo Viola in the final, 4–6, 6–3, [10–8].

== Seeds ==
1. (Germany) Philipp Marx / (Slovakia) Michal Mertiňák (semifinals)
2. (Italy) Riccardo Ghedin / (Italy) Claudio Grassi (first round)
3. (Spain) Gerard Granollers / (Spain) Pere Riba (withdrew)
4. (Slovakia) Andrej Martin / (Czech Republic) Jaroslav Pospíšil (quarterfinals)

== Draw ==
=== Key ===
- Q = Qualifier
- WC = Wild card
- LL = Lucky loser
- Alt = Alternate
- ITF = ITF entry
- PR = Protected ranking
- SR = Special ranking
- SE = Special exempt
- JE = Junior exempt
- JR = Junior Accelerator Programme entrant
- CO = College Accelerator Programme entrant
- NG = Next Gen Accelerator Program entrant
- w/o = Walkover
- r = Retired
- d = Defaulted

=== Draw ===
First round
1	(Germany) P Marx (Slovakia) M Mertiňák	6^{3}	6	[15]
(Belgium) M Authom (France) M Teixeira	7^{7}	2	[13]
WC	(Czech Republic) M Michalička (Czech Republic) J Minář	6	3	[10]
WC	(Czech Republic) Jakub Lustyk (Czech Republic) David Novák	3	6	[6]
4	(Slovakia) A Martin (Czech Republic) J Pospíšil	3	7^{7}	[10]
PR	(France) O Charroin (Poland) M Kowalczyk	6	6^{5}	[2]
(Russia) A Kuznetsov (Spain) A Menéndez-Maceiras	6	6
(Canada) S Diez (Hungary) M Fucsovics	3	3
(Czech Republic) R Jebavý (Czech Republic) J Mertl	4	4
(Italy) A Motti (Italy) M Viola	6	6
WC	(Czech Republic) D Kellovský (Czech Republic) P Šnobel	6	6^{4}	[6]
Alt	(Poland) A Kapaś (Poland) B Koniusz	2	7^{7}	[10]
(Bosnia and Herzegovina) D Džumhur (Croatia) K Mesaroš	1	1
(France) S Robert (Italy) S Vagnozzi	6	6
(Italy) L Giustino (Spain) E López-Pérez	4	7^{11}	[10]
2	(Italy) R Ghedin (Italy) C Grassi	6	6^{9}	[3]

Quarterfinals
1	(Germany) P Marx (Slovakia) M Mertiňák	5	6	[11]
WC	(Czech Republic) M Michalička (Czech Republic) J Minář	7	1	[9]
4	(Slovakia) A Martin (Czech Republic) J Pospíšil	4	5
(Russia) A Kuznetsov (Spain) A Menéndez-Maceiras	6	7
(Italy) A Motti (Italy) M Viola	6	7
Alt	(Poland) A Kapaś (Poland) B Koniusz	3	5
(France) S Robert (Italy) S Vagnozzi	6	6
(Italy) L Giustino (Spain) E López-Pérez	2	3

Semifinals
1	(Germany) P Marx (Slovakia) M Mertiňák	3	6	[6]
(Russia) A Kuznetsov (Spain) A Menéndez-Maceiras	6	4	[10]
(Italy) A Motti (Italy) M Viola	6	7
(France) S Robert (Italy) S Vagnozzi	3	5

Final
(Russia) A Kuznetsov (Spain) A Menéndez-Maceiras	4	6	[10]
(Italy) A Motti (Italy) M Viola	6	3	[8]
