= 2021 Ostrava Challenger – Doubles =

Doubles
- 2021 Ostrava Challenger

Final
- Champions: (Australia) Marc Polmans (Ukraine) Sergiy Stakhovsky
- Runners-up: (Czech Republic) Andrew Paulson (Czech Republic) Patrik Rikl
- Score: 7–6^{(7–4)}, 3–6, [10–7]

Events
Singles	Doubles
← 2020 ·	Ostrava Challenger	· 2022 →

Artem Sitak and Igor Zelenay were the defending champions but only Zelenay chose to defend his title, partnering Roman Jebavý. Zelenay lost in the quarterfinals to Zdeněk Kolář and Lukáš Rosol.

Marc Polmans and Sergiy Stakhovsky won the title after defeating Andrew Paulson and Patrik Rikl 7–6^{(7–4)}, 3–6, [10–7] in the final.

== Seeds ==
1. (Czech Republic) Roman Jebavý / (Slovakia) Igor Zelenay (quarterfinals)
2. (Venezuela) Luis David Martínez / (Belarus) Andrei Vasilevski (first round)
3. (United States) Evan King / (United States) Hunter Reese (semifinals)
4. (Poland) Karol Drzewiecki / (Poland) Szymon Walków (quarterfinals)

== Draw ==
=== Key ===
- Q = Qualifier
- WC = Wild card
- LL = Lucky loser
- Alt = Alternate
- SE = Special exempt
- PR = Protected ranking
- ITF = ITF entry
- JE = Junior exempt
- w/o = Walkover
- r = Retired
- d = Defaulted
- SR = Special ranking

First round
1	(Czech Republic) R Jebavý (Slovakia) I Zelenay	6	6^{5}	[10]
(France) M Guinard (France) A Rinderknech	2	7^{7}	[3]
(Czech Republic) Z Kolář (Czech Republic) L Rosol	6	7^{7}
WC	(Czech Republic) J Lehečka (Czech Republic) M Vrbenský	1	6^{3}
4	(Poland) K Drzewiecki (Poland) S Walków	6	6
(Switzerland) L Margaroli (Canada) A Shamasdin	3	2
(Austria) L Miedler (Egypt) M Safwat	6	6^{5}	[1]
(Australia) M Polmans (Ukraine) S Stakhovsky	4	7^{7}	[10]
(India) S Balaji (India) J Nedunchezhiyan	6	6
(Canada) P Polansky (Canada) B Schnur	3	3
(Russia) T Gabashvili (Russia) R Safiullin	2	3
3	(United States) E King (United States) H Reese	6	6
WC	(Czech Republic) V Kopřiva (Czech Republic) D Svrčina	4	3
WC	(Czech Republic) A Paulson (Czech Republic) P Rikl	6	6
(Chile) MT Barrios Vera (Chile) A Tabilo	6	2	[10]
2	(Venezuela) LD Martínez (Belarus) A Vasilevski	1	6	[6]

Quarterfinals
1	(Czech Republic) R Jebavý (Slovakia) I Zelenay	3	1
(Czech Republic) Z Kolář (Czech Republic) L Rosol	6	6
4	(Poland) K Drzewiecki (Poland) S Walków	6^{6}	5
(Australia) M Polmans (Ukraine) S Stakhovsky	7^{8}	7
(India) S Balaji (India) J Nedunchezhiyan	2	6	[6]
3	(United States) E King (United States) H Reese	6	2	[10]
WC	(Czech Republic) A Paulson (Czech Republic) P Rikl	3	7	[10]
(Chile) MT Barrios Vera (Chile) A Tabilo	6	5	[8]

Semifinals
(Czech Republic) Z Kolář (Czech Republic) L Rosol	6	2	[7]
(Australia) M Polmans (Ukraine) S Stakhovsky	3	6	[10]
3	(United States) E King (United States) H Reese	4	4
WC	(Czech Republic) A Paulson (Czech Republic) P Rikl	6	6

Final
(Australia) M Polmans (Ukraine) S Stakhovsky	7^{7}	3	[10]
WC	(Czech Republic) A Paulson (Czech Republic) P Rikl	6^{4}	6	[7]
