= 2014 Prosperita Open – Singles =

Singles
- 2014 Prosperita Open

Final
- Champion: (Russia) Andrey Kuznetsov
- Runner-up: (Slovakia) Miloslav Mečíř Jr.
- Score: 2–6, 6–3, 6–0

Events
Singles	Doubles
← 2013 ·	Prosperita Open	· 2015 →

Jiří Veselý was the defending champion, but decided not to compete.

Andrey Kuznetsov won the title, defeating Miloslav Mečíř Jr. in the final, 2–6, 6–3, 6–0.

== Seeds ==
1. (Czech Republic) Radek Štěpánek (quarterfinals)
2. (France) Stéphane Robert (quarterfinals)
3. (Spain) Pere Riba (first round)
4. (Slovenia) Blaž Rola (semifinals)
5. (Austria) Andreas Haider-Maurer (semifinals)
6. (Czech Republic) Jan Hájek (first round)
7. (Bosnia and Herzegovina) Damir Džumhur (second round)
8. (Russia) Andrey Kuznetsov (champion)

== Draw ==
=== Key ===
- Q = Qualifier
- WC = Wild card
- LL = Lucky loser
- Alt = Alternate
- ITF = ITF entry
- PR = Protected ranking
- SR = Special ranking
- SE = Special exempt
- JE = Junior exempt
- JR = Junior Accelerator Programme entrant
- CO = College Accelerator Programme entrant
- NG = Next Gen Accelerator Program entrant
- w/o = Walkover
- r = Retired
- d = Defaulted

=== Finals ===
Semifinals
8	(Russia) Andrey Kuznetsov	6	6
4	(Slovenia) Blaž Rola	3	0
(Slovakia) Miloslav Mečíř Jr.	6	6
5	(Austria) Andreas Haider-Maurer	2	1

Final
8	(Russia) Andrey Kuznetsov	2	6	6
(Slovakia) Miloslav Mečíř Jr.	6	3	0

=== Top half ===
First round
1/WC	(Czech Republic) R Štěpánek	6	6
Alt	(Belarus) U Ignatik	4	2
(Croatia) K Mesaroš	5	6	3
WC	(Czech Republic) Jakub Lustyk	7	0	6
(Czech Republic) J Mertl	6	6
(Canada) S Diez	3	2
Q	(Czech Republic) M Michalička	0	4
8	(Russia) A Kuznetsov	6	6
4	(Slovenia) B Rola	5	6	6
WC	(Czech Republic) J Minář	7	0	2
Q	(Italy) R Ghedin	3	2
(Hungary) M Fucsovics	6	6
(Belgium) M Authom	6^{3}	6	3
(Italy) L Giustino	7^{7}	1	6
LL	(Italy) R Bellotti	6^{7}	2
7	(Bosnia and Herzegovina) D Džumhur	7^{9}	6

Second round
1/WC	(Czech Republic) R Štěpánek	6	6
WC	(Czech Republic) J Lustyk	3	0
(Czech Republic) J Mertl	5	2
8	(Russia) A Kuznetsov	7	6
4	(Slovenia) B Rola	6	7
(Hungary) M Fucsovics	1	5
(Italy) L Giustino	6	6
7	(Bosnia and Herzegovina) D Džumhur	4	1

Quarterfinals
1/WC	(Czech Republic) R Štěpánek	6	4	6^{10}
8	(Russia) A Kuznetsov	1	6	7^{12}
4	(Slovenia) B Rola	6	3	6
(Italy) L Giustino	4	6	3

Semifinals
8	(Russia) A Kuznetsov	6	6
4	(Slovenia) B Rola	3	0

=== Bottom half ===
First round
6	(Czech Republic) J Hájek	7	3	3
(Spain) A Menéndez-Maceiras	5	6	6
(Spain) G Granollers	7^{9}	6
(France) M Teixeira	6^{7}	4
WC	(Czech Republic) A Pavlásek	6	6
Q	(Ukraine) A Smirnov	2	3
(Slovakia) M Mečíř Jr.	6	3	7^{7}
3	(Spain) P Riba	4	6	6^{2}
5	(Austria) A Haider-Maurer	2	6	6
(Czech Republic) J Hernych	6	4	4
(Slovakia) A Martin	6	4	6
Q	(Russia) Aslan Karatsev	3	6	2
(Italy) M Viola	4	6	4
(Spain) E López-Pérez	6	3	6
(Czech Republic) J Pospíšil	3	5
2	(France) S Robert	6	7

Second round
(Spain) A Menéndez-Maceiras	6	6
(Spain) G Granollers	4	1
WC	(Czech Republic) A Pavlásek	4	1
(Slovakia) M Mečíř Jr.	6	6
5	(Austria) A Haider-Maurer	2	6	7
(Slovakia) A Martin	6	1	5
(Spain) E López-Pérez	6	4	2
2	(France) S Robert	4	6	6

Quarterfinals
(Spain) A Menéndez-Maceiras	3	1
(Slovakia) M Mečíř Jr.	6	6
5	(Austria) A Haider-Maurer	6	7
2	(France) S Robert	3	5

Semifinals
(Slovakia) M Mečíř Jr.	6	6
5	(Austria) A Haider-Maurer	2	1
