= 2022 Ostra Group Open – Singles =

Singles
- 2022 Ostra Group Open

Final
- Champion: (France) Evan Furness
- Runner-up: (United Kingdom) Ryan Peniston
- Score: 4–6, 7–6^{(8–6)}, 6–1

Events
Singles	Doubles
← 2021 ·	Ostra Group Open	· 2023 →

Benjamin Bonzi was the defending champion but chose not to defend his title.

Evan Furness won the title after defeating Ryan Peniston 4–6, 7–6^{(8–6)}, 6–1 in the final.

== Seeds ==
1. (France) Corentin Moutet (first round)
2. (Germany) Mats Moraing (first round)
3. (Chinese Taipei) Tseng Chun-hsin (second round)
4. (Australia) Aleksandar Vukic (first round)
5. (Czech Republic) Zdeněk Kolář (quarterfinals)
6. (Austria) Dennis Novak (second round, retired)
7. (Austria) Jurij Rodionov (second round)
8. (Kazakhstan) Dmitry Popko (second round)

== Draw ==
=== Key ===
- Q = Qualifier
- WC = Wild card
- LL = Lucky loser
- Alt = Alternate
- SE = Special exempt
- PR = Protected ranking
- ITF = ITF entry
- JE = Junior exempt
- w/o = Walkover
- r = Retired
- d = Defaulted
- SR = Special ranking

=== Finals ===
Semifinals
Alt	(Czech Republic) Dalibor Svrčina	6	4	2
(United Kingdom) Ryan Peniston	4	6	6
Q	(France) Evan Furness	7^{7}	6
(France) Constant Lestienne	6^{3}	2

Final
(United Kingdom) Ryan Peniston	6	6^{6}	1
Q	(France) Evan Furness	4	7^{8}	6

=== Top half ===
First round
1	(France) C Moutet	1	6	6^{3}
Alt	(Czech Republic) D Svrčina	6	4	7^{7}
LL	(Austria) L Miedler	6	6
WC	(Czech Republic) J Menšík	1	1
(Slovakia) J Kovalík	5	4
WC	(Czech Republic) J Forejtek	7	6
(Austria) S Ofner	6^{5}	6	4
8	(Kazakhstan) D Popko	7^{7}	3	6
4	(Australia) A Vukic	6	4	2
Q	(Germany) M Rosenkranz	4	6	6
(Italy) L Giustino	6	5	6
(France) G Barrère	4	7	4
(Croatia) B Gojo	6^{5}	3
(United Kingdom) R Peniston	7^{7}	6
WC	(Slovakia) M Karol	2	2
7	(Austria) J Rodionov	6	6

Second round
Alt	(Czech Republic) D Svrčina	3	6	6
LL	(Austria) L Miedler	6	3	4
WC	(Czech Republic) J Forejtek	6	6
8	(Kazakhstan) D Popko	2	3
Q	(Germany) M Rosenkranz	6	5	6
(Italy) L Giustino	1	7	4
(United Kingdom) R Peniston	6	3	6
7	(Austria) J Rodionov	4	6	4

Quarterfinals
Alt	(Czech Republic) D Svrčina	6	5	6
WC	(Czech Republic) J Forejtek	3	7	4
Q	(Germany) M Rosenkranz	4	5
(United Kingdom) R Peniston	6	7

Semifinals
Alt	(Czech Republic) D Svrčina	6	4	2
(United Kingdom) R Peniston	4	6	6

=== Bottom half ===
First round
5	(Czech Republic) Z Kolář	6	7
Q	(Czech Republic) L Rosol	3	5
Q	(United States) Em Nava	2	4
(Slovakia) F Horanský	6	6
Q	(France) E Furness	6	6
(Slovakia) L Lacko	1	1
Q	(Czech Republic) Pavel Nejedlý	2	4
3	(Chinese Taipei) C-h Tseng	6	6
6	(Austria) D Novak	7^{7}	7^{9}
LL	(Slovakia) L Klein	6^{4}	6^{7}
(France) C Lestienne	6	6
(Poland) K Żuk	0	1
Alt	(Hungary) A Balázs	6^{4}	4
Alt	(Ukraine) V Sachko	7^{7}	6
Q	(Poland) D Michalski	6	7
2	(Germany) M Moraing	3	5

Second round
5	(Czech Republic) Z Kolář	5
(Slovakia) F Horanský	0^{r}
Q	(France) E Furness	6	6
3	(Chinese Taipei) C-h Tseng	1	1
6	(Austria) D Novak	2	0^{r}
(France) C Lestienne	6	2
Alt	(Ukraine) V Sachko	6	4	6
Q	(Poland) D Michalski	4	6	2

Quarterfinals
5	(Czech Republic) Z Kolář	3	6	6^{6}
Q	(France) E Furness	6	2	7^{8}
(France) C Lestienne	7	6^{3}	7
Alt	(Ukraine) V Sachko	5	7^{7}	5

Semifinals
Q	(France) E Furness	7^{7}	6
(France) C Lestienne	6^{3}	2
