= 2025 Ostra Group Open – Singles =

Singles
- 2025 Ostra Group Open

Final
- Champion: (Hungary) Zsombor Piros
- Runner-up: (Lebanon) Hady Habib
- Score: 6–3, 6–2

Events
Singles	Doubles
← 2024 ·	Ostra Group Open	· 2026 →

Damir Džumhur was the defending champion but chose not to defend his title.

Zsombor Piros won the title after defeating Hady Habib 6–3, 6–2 in the final.

== Seeds ==
1. (Czech Republic) Vít Kopřiva (quarterfinals)
2. (Denmark) Elmer Møller (first round)
3. (France) Adrian Mannarino (first round)
4. (Czech Republic) Dalibor Svrčina (first round)
5. (France) Harold Mayot (first round)
6. (Hong Kong) Coleman Wong (first round)
7. (Slovakia) Lukáš Klein (second round)
8. (Lebanon) Hady Habib (final)

== Draw ==
=== Key ===
- Q = Qualifier
- WC = Wild card
- LL = Lucky loser
- Alt = Alternate
- ITF = ITF entry
- PR = Protected ranking
- SR = Special ranking
- SE = Special exempt
- JE = Junior exempt
- JR = Junior Accelerator Programme entrant
- CO = College Accelerator Programme entrant
- NG = Next Gen Accelerator Program entrant
- w/o = Walkover
- r = Retired
- d = Defaulted

=== Finals ===
Semifinals
8	(Lebanon) Hady Habib	4	6	6
(Spain) Oriol Roca Batalla	6	3	4
(Hungary) Zsombor Piros	6	6
(Belgium) Gauthier Onclin	3	2

Final
8	(Lebanon) Hady Habib	3	2
(Hungary) Zsombor Piros	6	6

=== Top half ===
First round
1	(Czech Republic) V Kopřiva	6	6
Q	(Spain) Àlex Martínez	2	1
(Romania) FC Jianu	6	6
Q	(Germany) R Molleker	4	4
WC	(Czech Republic) J Jermář	0	2
(United Kingdom) D Evans	6	6
(Uzbekistan) K Sultanov	3	6^{4}
8	(Lebanon) H Habib	6	7^{7}
3	(France) A Mannarino	0	6^{4}
LL	(Ukraine) V Sachko	6	7^{7}
(France) L Van Assche	6^{4}	2
(Germany) H Squire	7^{7}	6
Q	(Netherlands) M Houkes	3	5
(Spain) O Roca Batalla	6	7
(Denmark) A Holmgren	3	6	3
7	(Slovakia) L Klein	6	3	6

Second round
1	(Czech Republic) V Kopřiva	6	6
(Romania) FC Jianu	3	3
(United Kingdom) D Evans	3	4
8	(Lebanon) H Habib	6	6
LL	(Ukraine) V Sachko	5	2
(Germany) H Squire	7	6
(Spain) O Roca Batalla	6	5	7^{7}
7	(Slovakia) L Klein	4	7	6^{3}

Quarterfinals
1	(Czech Republic) V Kopřiva	3	4
8	(Lebanon) H Habib	6	6
(Germany) H Squire	5	1
(Spain) O Roca Batalla	7	6

Semifinals
8	(Lebanon) H Habib	4	6	6
(Spain) O Roca Batalla	6	3	4

=== Bottom half ===
First round
5	(France) H Mayot	6^{1}	4
(Spain) D Rincón	7^{7}	6
Q	(Slovakia) N Gombos	2	6	7
Q	(Netherlands) J Sels	6	0	5
(United States) M Cassone	4	6^{3}
WC	(Czech Republic) J Kumstát	6	7^{7}
(Hungary) Z Piros	6	6
4	(Czech Republic) D Svrčina	3	1
6	(Hong Kong) C Wong	2	7	3
(Belgium) G Onclin	6	5	6
WC	(Czech Republic) M Mrva	6^{4}	1
(Lithuania) E Butvilas	7^{7}	6
Q	(Czech Republic) Petr Brunclík	6	6
(Moldova) R Albot	2	1
A Karatsev	6	6
2	(Denmark) E Møller	3	2

Second round
(Spain) D Rincón	7^{8}	1	7
Q	(Slovakia) N Gombos	6^{6}	6	5
WC	(Czech Republic) J Kumstát	3	3
(Hungary) Z Piros	6	6
(Belgium) G Onclin	5	6	6
(Lithuania) E Butvilas	7	2	2
Q	(Czech Republic) P Brunclík	6^{4}	6	6
A Karatsev	7^{7}	3	3

Quarterfinals
(Spain) D Rincón	3	5
(Hungary) Z Piros	6	7
(Belgium) G Onclin	1	6	7
Q	(Czech Republic) P Brunclík	6	0	5

Semifinals
(Hungary) Z Piros	6	6
(Belgium) G Onclin	3	2
