= 2020 Prosperita Open =

- Date: 31 August – 6 September
- Edition: 17th
- Draw: 32S / 16D
- Surface: Clay
- Location: Ostrava, Czech Republic

Champions

Singles
- (Russia) Aslan Karatsev

Doubles
- (New Zealand) Artem Sitak / (Slovakia) Igor Zelenay
← 2019 ·	Prosperita Open	· 2021 →

The 2020 Prosperita Open was a professional tennis tournament played on clay courts. It was the 17th edition of the tournament which was part of the 2020 ATP Challenger Tour. It took place in Ostrava, Czech Republic between 31 August and 6 September.

== Singles main-draw entrants ==
=== Seeds ===
Country	Player	Rank^{1}	Seed
SUI	Henri Laaksonen	129	1
BLR	Ilya Ivashka	138	2
KOR	Chung Hyeon	142	3
LAT	Ernests Gulbis	158	4
SVK	Martin Kližan	160	5
~~FRA~~	~~Arthur Rinderknech~~	~~161~~	~~6~~
CAN	Steven Diez	165	7
UKR	Sergiy Stakhovsky	168	8

- ^{1} Rankings are as of 24 August 2020.

=== Other entrants ===
The following players received wildcards into the singles main draw:

- (Czech Republic) Tomáš Macháč
- (Czech Republic) Dalibor Svrčina
- (Finland) Otto Virtanen

The following players received entry into the singles main draw as special exempts:

- (Netherlands) Tallon Griekspoor
- (Russia) Aslan Karatsev

The following players received entry from the qualifying draw:

- (Switzerland) Marc-Andrea Hüsler
- (Czech Republic) Zdeněk Kolář
- (Czech Republic) Vít Kopřiva
- (Germany) Mats Moraing

The following player received entry as a lucky loser:

- (Tunisia) Malek Jaziri

== Champions ==
=== Singles ===
- (Russia) Aslan Karatsev def. (Germany) Oscar Otte 6–4, 6–2.

=== Doubles ===
- (New Zealand) Artem Sitak / (Slovakia) Igor Zelenay def. (Poland) Karol Drzewiecki / (Poland) Szymon Walków 7–5, 6–4.
