= 2025 Ostra Group Open – Doubles =

Doubles
- 2025 Ostra Group Open

Final
- Champions: (Czech Republic) Jan Jermář (Serbia) Stefan Latinović
- Runners-up: (New Zealand) Finn Reynolds (New Zealand) James Watt
- Score: 7–5, 6–3

Events
Singles	Doubles
- Ostra Group Open

Jaime Faria and Henrique Rocha were the defending champions but chose not to defend their title.

Jan Jermář and Stefan Latinović won the title after defeating Finn Reynolds and James Watt 7–5, 6–3 in the final.

== Seeds ==
1. (Finland) Patrik Niklas-Salminen / (Poland) Szymon Walków (semifinals)
2. (Czech Republic) Matěj Vocel / (Czech Republic) Michael Vrbenský (semifinals)
3. (India) Siddhant Banthia / (Bulgaria) Alexander Donski (first round)
4. (Czech Republic) Jiří Barnat / (Czech Republic) Filip Duda (first round)

== Draw ==
Key

- Q = Qualifier
- WC = Wild card
- LL = Lucky loser
- Alt = Alternate
- ITF = ITF entry
- PR = Protected ranking
- SR = Special ranking
- SE = Special exempt
- JE = Junior exempt
- JR = Junior Accelerator Programme entrant
- CO = College Accelerator Programme entrant
- NG = Next Gen Accelerator Program entrant
- w/o = Walkover
- r = Retired
- d = Defaulted

=== Draw ===
First round
1	(Finland) P Niklas-Salminen (Poland) S Walków	7	6
WC	(Czech Republic) M Mrva (Czech Republic) D Svrčina	5	0
(Netherlands) M Hermans (Netherlands) M Houkes	5	6	[3]
(France) L Sanchez (United Kingdom) M Whitehouse	7	2	[10]
4	(Czech Republic) Jiří Barnat (Czech Republic) F Duda	6^{5}	4
(Lithuania) E Butvilas (Hong Kong) C Wong	7^{7}	6
(New Zealand) F Reynolds (New Zealand) J Watt	6	6
(Czech Republic) V Kopřiva (Czech Republic) D Poljak	1	4
(Denmark) A Holmgren (Canada) K Stevenson	5	7^{7}	[8]
WC	(Czech Republic) J Jermář (Serbia) S Latinović	7	6^{3}	[10]
(Moldova) R Albot (Ukraine) D Molchanov	5	6	[10]
3	(India) S Banthia (Bulgaria) A Donski	7	4	[5]
(Lebanon) H Habib (Croatia) M Poljičak	2	6	[7]
(Spain) D Rincón (Spain) O Roca Batalla	6	3	[10]
PR	(Czech Republic) A Paulson (Ukraine) V Sachko	6	4	[10]
2	(Czech Republic) M Vocel (Czech Republic) M Vrbenský	4	6	[12]

Quarterfinals
1	(Finland) P Niklas-Salminen (Poland) S Walków	1	6	[11]
(France) L Sanchez (United Kingdom) M Whitehouse	6	4	[9]
(Lithuania) E Butvilas (Hong Kong) C Wong	4	1
(New Zealand) F Reynolds (New Zealand) J Watt	6	6
WC	(Czech Republic) J Jermář (Serbia) S Latinović	6	7^{9}
(Moldova) R Albot (Ukraine) D Molchanov	3	6^{7}
(Spain) D Rincón (Spain) O Roca Batalla	5	7^{7}	[10]
2	(Czech Republic) M Vocel (Czech Republic) M Vrbenský	7	6^{5}	[12]

Semifinals
1	(Finland) P Niklas-Salminen (Poland) S Walków	3	6	[8]
(New Zealand) F Reynolds (New Zealand) J Watt	6	4	[10]
WC	(Czech Republic) J Jermář (Serbia) S Latinović	4	6	[10]
2	(Czech Republic) M Vocel (Czech Republic) M Vrbenský	6	3	[8]

Final
(New Zealand) F Reynolds (New Zealand) J Watt	5	3
WC	(Czech Republic) J Jermář (Serbia) S Latinović	7	6
