= 2023 Ostra Group Open – Doubles =

Doubles
- 2023 Ostra Group Open

Final
- Champions: (United States) Robert Galloway (Mexico) Miguel Ángel Reyes-Varela
- Runners-up: (Argentina) Guido Andreozzi (Argentina) Guillermo Durán
- Score: 7–5, 7–6^{(7–5)}

Events
| Singles | Doubles |
| ← 2022 · | Ostra Group Open | · 2024 → |

Alexander Erler and Lucas Miedler were the defending champions but chose not to defend their title.

Robert Galloway and Miguel Ángel Reyes-Varela won the title after defeating Guido Andreozzi and Guillermo Durán 7–5, 7–6^{(7–5)} in the final.

== Seeds ==
1. (United States) Robert Galloway / (Mexico) Miguel Ángel Reyes-Varela (champions)
2. (Argentina) Guido Andreozzi / (Argentina) Guillermo Durán (final)
3. (Czech Republic) Roman Jebavý / (Austria) Philipp Oswald (quarterfinals)
4. (Serbia) Ivan Sabanov / (Serbia) Matej Sabanov (first round)

== Draw ==
=== Key ===
- Q = Qualifier
- WC = Wild card
- LL = Lucky loser
- Alt = Alternate
- ITF = ITF entry
- PR = Protected ranking
- SR = Special ranking
- SE = Special exempt
- JE = Junior exempt
- JR = Junior Accelerator Programme entrant
- CO = College Accelerator Programme entrant
- NG = Next Gen Accelerator Program entrant
- w/o = Walkover
- r = Retired
- d = Defaulted

First round
1 | (United States) R Galloway (Mexico) MÁ Reyes-Varela | 6 | 6
(United Kingdom) L Johnson (Netherlands) S Verbeek | 3 | 4
(Czech Republic) V Kopřiva (Ukraine) O Krutykh | 2 | 4
(Czech Republic) Z Kolář (Czech Republic) A Pavlásek | 6 | 6
3 | (Czech Republic) R Jebavý (Austria) P Oswald | 6 | 6
(Czech Republic) P Nouza (Czech Republic) A Paulson | 3 | 4
(Poland) K Drzewiecki (Poland) S Walków | 6 | 3 | [8]
(France) G Blancaneaux (United Kingdom) R Peniston | 3 | 6 | [10]
(France) D Added (France) T Arribagé | 5 | 6 | [6]
WC | (Czech Republic) H Bartoň (Czech Republic) P Rikl | 7 | 3 | [10]
WC | (Czech Republic) J Menšík (Czech Republic) D Svrčina | 7 | 6
4 | (Serbia) I Sabanov (Serbia) M Sabanov | 5 | 4
(Latvia) M Lībietis (United States) H Reese | 6 | 7^{7}
Alt | (Romania) ND Ionel (Romania) A Jecan | 2 | 6^{5}
(Ukraine) V Manafov (Slovakia) I Zelenay | 5 | 4
2 | (Argentina) G Andreozzi (Argentina) G Durán | 7 | 6

Quarterfinals
1 | (United States) R Galloway (Mexico) MÁ Reyes-Varela | 4 | 6 | [10]
(Czech Republic) Z Kolář (Czech Republic) A Pavlásek | 6 | 2 | [6]
3 | (Czech Republic) R Jebavý (Austria) P Oswald | 4 | 4
(France) G Blancaneaux (United Kingdom) R Peniston | 6 | 6
WC | (Czech Republic) H Bartoň (Czech Republic) P Rikl | 4 | 3
WC | (Czech Republic) J Menšík (Czech Republic) D Svrčina | 6 | 6
(Latvia) M Lībietis (United States) H Reese | 4 | 4
2 | (Argentina) G Andreozzi (Argentina) G Durán | 6 | 6

Semifinals
1 | (United States) R Galloway (Mexico) MÁ Reyes-Varela | 6 | 6
(France) G Blancaneaux (United Kingdom) R Peniston | 4 | 1
WC | (Czech Republic) J Menšík (Czech Republic) D Svrčina | 1 | 3
2 | (Argentina) G Andreozzi (Argentina) G Durán | 6 | 6

Final
1 | (United States) R Galloway (Mexico) MÁ Reyes-Varela | 7 | 7^{7}
2 | (Argentina) G Andreozzi (Argentina) G Durán | 5 | 6^{5}
