= 2016 Prosperita Open – Singles =

Singles
- 2016 Prosperita Open

Final
- Champion: (France) Constant Lestienne
- Runner-up: (Czech Republic) Zdeněk Kolář
- Score: 6–7^{(5–7)}, 6–1, 6–2

Events
Singles	Doubles
- Prosperita Open

Íñigo Cervantes was the defending champion but chose not to participate.

Constant Lestienne won the title after defeating Zdeněk Kolář 6–7^{(5–7)}, 6–1, 6–2 in the final.

== Seeds ==
1. (Czech Republic) Adam Pavlásek (first round)
2. (Slovenia) Blaž Rola (first round)
3. (Estonia) Jürgen Zopp (quarterfinals)
4. (Serbia) Peđa Krstin (second round)
5. (Belgium) Kimmer Coppejans (second round)
6. (Chile) Hans Podlipnik (first round)
7. (Belarus) Uladzimir Ignatik (second round)
8. (France) David Guez (second round)

== Draw ==
Key

- Q = Qualifier
- WC = Wild card
- LL = Lucky loser
- Alt = Alternate
- ITF = ITF entry
- PR = Protected ranking
- SR = Special ranking
- SE = Special exempt
- JE = Junior exempt
- JR = Junior Accelerator Programme entrant
- CO = College Accelerator Programme entrant
- NG = Next Gen Accelerator Program entrant
- w/o = Walkover
- r = Retired
- d = Defaulted

=== Finals ===
Semifinals
WC	(Czech Republic) Zdeněk Kolář	6	6
Q	(Czech Republic) Marek Michalička	2	1
(France) Constant Lestienne	6	6
Q	(Italy) Stefano Napolitano	2	4

Final
WC	(Czech Republic) Zdeněk Kolář	7^{7}	1	2
(France) Constant Lestienne	6^{5}	6	6

=== Top half ===
First round
1	(Czech Republic) A Pavlásek	3	6^{2}
(Japan) Y Uchiyama	6	7^{7}
WC	(Czech Republic) Z Kolář	7	6
WC	(Czech Republic) D Poljak	5	4
(Spain) J Samper-Montaña	6	7^{7}
(Italy) M Viola	2	6^{4}
(France) J Eysseric	1	2
5	(Belgium) K Coppejans	6	6
4	(Serbia) P Krstin	6	6
(Austria) D Novak	3	3
(Serbia) L Djere	3	6	6
(Czech Republic) J Šátral	6	4	3
(France) M Chazal	6	2	4
Q	(Czech Republic) M Michalička	3	6	6
WC	(Serbia) J Tipsarević	7^{7}	3	6
6	(Chile) H Podlipnik	6^{5}	6	4

Second round
(Japan) Y Uchiyama	6	4	3
WC	(Czech Republic) Z Kolář	4	6	6
(Spain) J Samper-Montaña	6	3	6
5	(Belgium) K Coppejans	4	6	2
4	(Serbia) P Krstin	6^{2}	7	4
(Serbia) L Djere	7^{7}	5	6
Q	(Czech Republic) M Michalička	3	7^{7}	6
WC	(Serbia) J Tipsarević	6	6^{1}	4

Quarterfinals
WC	(Czech Republic) Z Kolář	6	3	6
(Spain) J Samper-Montaña	3	6	3
(Serbia) L Djere	5	2
Q	(Czech Republic) M Michalička	7	6

Semifinals
WC	(Czech Republic) Z Kolář	6	6
Q	(Czech Republic) M Michalička	2	1

=== Bottom half ===
First round
8	(France) D Guez	7^{7}	6
(Italy) G Naso	6^{4}	0
(France) C Lestienne	6	6
Q	(Slovakia) A Martin	4	3
(France) G Sakharov	4	4
Q	(Czech Republic) J Pospíšil	6	6
(Belgium) Y Mertens	4	1
3	(Estonia) J Zopp	6	6
7	(Belarus) U Ignatik	6	2	6
(Italy) L Giustino	4	6	4
Q	(Italy) S Napolitano	6	6
(Spain) O Roca Batalla	4	4
(France) G Barrère	6	6
WC	(Slovakia) Dominik Šproch	1	3
(Argentina) P Cachin	6	6
2	(Slovenia) B Rola	4	4

Second round
8	(France) D Guez	6	2	4
(France) C Lestienne	1	6	6
Q	(Czech Republic) J Pospíšil	6	1	2
3	(Estonia) J Zopp	2	6	6
7	(Belarus) U Ignatik	5	4
Q	(Italy) S Napolitano	7	6
(France) G Barrère	7^{7}	6^{3}	7
(Argentina) P Cachin	6^{5}	7^{7}	5

Quarterfinals
(France) C Lestienne	6	6
3	(Estonia) J Zopp	4	3
Q	(Italy) S Napolitano	6	6^{2}	7^{8}
(France) G Barrère	2	7^{7}	6^{6}

Semifinals
(France) C Lestienne	6	6
Q	(Italy) S Napolitano	2	4
