= 2016 Prosperita Open – Doubles =

Doubles
- 2016 Prosperita Open

Final
- Champion: (Netherlands) Sander Arends (Austria) Tristan-Samuel Weissborn
- Runner-up: (Czech Republic) Lukáš Dlouhý (Chile) Hans Podlipnik
- Score: 7–6^{(10–8)}, 6–7^{(4–7)}, [10–5]

Events
Singles	Doubles
- Prosperita Open

Andrej Martin and Hans Podlipnik were the defending champions but chose to participate with different partners. Martin chose to participate with Tomasz Bednarek, while Podlipnik chose to partner with Lukáš Dlouhý. Martin and Podlipnik faced each other in the semifinals, with Podlipnik advancing to the final. Podlipnik failed to defend his title, losing to Sander Arends and Tristan-Samuel Weissborn 7–6^{(10–8)}, 6–7^{(4–7)}, [10–5] in the final.

== Seeds ==
1. (Poland) Tomasz Bednarek / (Slovakia) Andrej Martin (semifinals)
2. (Netherlands) Sander Arends / (Austria) Tristan-Samuel Weissborn (champions)
3. (Poland) Adam Majchrowicz / (Netherlands) Mark Vervoort (first round)
4. (Czech Republic) Lukáš Dlouhý / (Chile) Hans Podlipnik (final)

== Draw ==
Key

- Q = Qualifier
- WC = Wild card
- LL = Lucky loser
- Alt = Alternate
- ITF = ITF entry
- PR = Protected ranking
- SR = Special ranking
- SE = Special exempt
- JE = Junior exempt
- JR = Junior Accelerator Programme entrant
- CO = College Accelerator Programme entrant
- NG = Next Gen Accelerator Program entrant
- w/o = Walkover
- r = Retired
- d = Defaulted

First round
1	(Poland) T Bednarek (Slovakia) A Martin	6	4	[10]
(Italy) L Giustino (Spain) O Roca Batalla	3	6	[2]
(Slovakia) F Horanský (Germany) P Torebko	1	1
(Czech Republic) Libor Salaba (Czech Republic) J Šátral	6	6
4	(Czech Republic) L Dlouhý (Chile) H Podlipnik	6	6
(Argentina) P Cachin (Serbia) P Krstin	3	2
(Croatia) I Sabanov (Croatia) M Sabanov	6	6
(France) M Chazal (France) C Lestienne	3	1
WC	(Czech Republic) Petr Michnev (Czech Republic) J Pospíšil	6	7^{7}
WC	(Czech Republic) Z Kolář (Czech Republic) D Poljak	4	6^{5}
WC	(Czech Republic) D Kellovský (Slovenia) B Rola	6	7^{7}
3	(Poland) A Majchrowicz (Netherlands) M Vervoort	3	6^{4}
(France) D Guez (Belgium) Y Mertens	6^{6}	6	[10]
(Belarus) U Ignatik (Czech Republic) M Michalička	7^{8}	4	[12]
(France) G Barrère (France) J Eysseric	4	3
2	(Netherlands) S Arends (Austria) T-S Weissborn	6	6

Quarterfinals
1	(Poland) T Bednarek (Slovakia) A Martin	6	6
(Czech Republic) L Salaba (Czech Republic) J Šátral	3	3
4	(Czech Republic) L Dlouhý (Chile) H Podlipnik	7	6
(Croatia) I Sabanov (Croatia) M Sabanov	5	4
WC	(Czech Republic) P Michnev (Czech Republic) J Pospíšil	6	7^{7}
WC	(Czech Republic) D Kellovský (Slovenia) B Rola	4	6^{5}
(Belarus) U Ignatik (Czech Republic) M Michalička	3	1
2	(Netherlands) S Arends (Austria) T-S Weissborn	6	6

Semifinals
1	(Poland) T Bednarek (Slovakia) A Martin	2	4
4	(Czech Republic) L Dlouhý (Chile) H Podlipnik	6	6
WC	(Czech Republic) P Michnev (Czech Republic) J Pospíšil	5	4
2	(Netherlands) S Arends (Austria) T-S Weissborn	7	6

Final
4	(Czech Republic) L Dlouhý (Chile) H Podlipnik	6^{8}	7^{7}	[5]
2	(Netherlands) S Arends (Austria) T-S Weissborn	7^{10}	6^{4}	[10]
