= 2019 Prosperita Open – Singles =

Singles
- 2019 Prosperita Open

Final
- Champion: (Poland) Kamil Majchrzak
- Runner-up: (Italy) Jannik Sinner
- Score: 6–1, 6–0

Events
Singles	Doubles
- Prosperita Open

Arthur De Greef was the defending champion but lost in the third round to Tomáš Macháč.

Kamil Majchrzak won the title after defeating Jannik Sinner 6–1, 6–0 in the final.

== Seeds ==
All seeds receive a bye into the second round.

1. (South Africa) Lloyd Harris (semifinals)
2. (Czech Republic) Jiří Veselý (quarterfinals)
3. (Spain) Marcel Granollers (second round)
4. (Poland) Kamil Majchrzak (champion)
5. (Austria) Dennis Novak (quarterfinals)
6. (Italy) Stefano Travaglia (quarterfinals)
7. (Estonia) Jürgen Zopp (second round)
8. (Belgium) Arthur De Greef (third round)
9. (Germany) Dominik Köpfer (second round)
10. (Italy) Stefano Napolitano (second round)
11. (Netherlands) Tallon Griekspoor (second round)
12. (Croatia) Viktor Galović (third round)
13. (Czech Republic) Adam Pavlásek (second round)
14. (Slovakia) Norbert Gombos (third round)
15. (Netherlands) Thiemo de Bakker (second round)
16. (Italy) Matteo Viola (second round)

== Draw ==
Key

- Q = Qualifier
- WC = Wild card
- LL = Lucky loser
- Alt = Alternate
- ITF = ITF entry
- PR = Protected ranking
- SR = Special ranking
- SE = Special exempt
- JE = Junior exempt
- JR = Junior Accelerator Programme entrant
- CO = College Accelerator Programme entrant
- NG = Next Gen Accelerator Program entrant
- w/o = Walkover
- r = Retired
- d = Defaulted

=== Finals ===
Quarterfinals
1	(South Africa) Lloyd Harris	6	7
6	(Italy) Stefano Travaglia	1	5
4	(Poland) Kamil Majchrzak	6	6
5	(Austria) Dennis Novak	4	0
WC	(Czech Republic) Tomáš Macháč	4	1
(Canada) Steven Diez	6	6
(Italy) Jannik Sinner	6	7^{7}
2	(Czech Republic) Jiří Veselý	4	6^{4}

Semifinals
1	(South Africa) Lloyd Harris	6^{5}	6^{9}
4	(Poland) Kamil Majchrzak	7^{7}	7^{11}
(Canada) Steven Diez	4	6	2
(Italy) Jannik Sinner	6	4	6

Final
4	(Poland) Kamil Majchrzak	6	6
(Italy) Jannik Sinner	1	0

=== Top half ===
==== Section 1 ====
First round
(Romania) D Dima	6	3	7^{7}
(Hungary) M Valkusz	1	6	6^{4}
ITF	(Czech Republic) V Kopřiva	6	1	4
(Czech Republic) J Šátral	3	6	6
WC	(Czech Republic) D Poljak	4	7^{7}	6
Alt	(Italy) A Vavassori	6	6^{4}	4
Q	(Italy) E Dalla Valle	2	4
(Spain) R Ojeda Lara	6	6

Second round
1	(South Africa) L Harris	6	6
(Romania) D Dima	3	0
(Czech Republic) J Šátral	6^{3}	7^{7}	6
15	(Netherlands) T de Bakker	7^{7}	6^{5}	4
12	(Croatia) V Galović	6	6
WC	(Czech Republic) D Poljak	2	1
(Spain) R Ojeda Lara	4	6	2
6	(Italy) S Travaglia	6	1	6

Third round
1	(South Africa) L Harris	6	6
(Czech Republic) J Šátral	4	1
12	(Croatia) V Galović	4	4
6	(Italy) S Travaglia	6	6

Quarterfinals
1	(South Africa) L Harris	6	7
6	(Italy) S Travaglia	1	5

==== Section 2 ====
First round
ITF	(Italy) R Bonadio	6	4	6
(Bosnia and Herzegovina) T Brkić	2	6	3
(Hungary) Z Piros	6	6
(Czech Republic) V Šafránek	2	2
(Italy) A Basso	6	6
WC	(Czech Republic) M Gengel	2	2
(Bulgaria) D Kuzmanov	6	3
PR	(Spain) P Riba	2	1^{r}

Second round
4	(Poland) K Majchrzak	7	7
ITF	(Italy) R Bonadio	5	5
(Hungary) Z Piros	6	0	6
13	(Czech Republic) A Pavlásek	3	6	3
11	(Netherlands) T Griekspoor	6	3	2
(Italy) A Basso	3	6	6
(Bulgaria) D Kuzmanov	6	4	4
5	(Austria) D Novak	2	6	6

Third round
4	(Poland) K Majchrzak	7^{7}	6
(Hungary) Z Piros	6^{3}	3
(Italy) A Basso	5	4
5	(Austria) D Novak	7	6

Quarterfinals
4	(Poland) K Majchrzak	6	6
5	(Austria) D Novak	4	0

=== Bottom half ===
==== Section 3 ====
First round
(Russia) P Kotov	2	3
(France) B Bonzi	6	6
Q	(Czech Republic) J Forejtek	3	3
WC	(Czech Republic) T Macháč	6	6
(Finland) E Ruusuvuori	6^{4}	4
ITF	(Germany) Peter Heller	7^{7}	6
(Canada) S Diez	6	6
(France) E Couacaud	1	1

Second round
8	(Belgium) A De Greef	6	3	6
(France) B Bonzi	2	6	3
WC	(Czech Republic) T Macháč	6	7^{7}
10	(Italy) S Napolitano	1	6^{4}
14	(Slovakia) N Gombos	6	7
ITF	(Germany) P Heller	4	5
(Canada) S Diez	4	6	6
3	(Spain) M Granollers	6	4	4

Third round
8	(Belgium) A De Greef	6	6^{6}	6^{4}
WC	(Czech Republic) T Macháč	1	7^{8}	7^{7}
14	(Slovakia) N Gombos	7^{7}	3	6^{4}
(Canada) S Diez	6^{1}	6	7^{7}

Quarterfinals
WC	(Czech Republic) T Macháč	4	1
(Canada) S Diez	6	6

==== Section 4 ====
First round
WC	(Czech Republic) J Lehečka	7	4	6
WC	(Czech Republic) D Svrčina	5	6	1
(Italy) J Sinner	6	7^{8}
(Hungary) A Balázs	4	6^{6}
ITF	(Russia) I Gakhov	3	6	6
ITF	(Russia) A Zhurbin	6	1	4
(Netherlands) J Sels	7	5	6
(Slovakia) A Molčan	5	7	4

Second round
7	(Estonia) J Zopp	5	7^{7}	4
WC	(Czech Republic) J Lehečka	7	6^{4}	6
(Italy) J Sinner	6	6
9	(Germany) D Köpfer	2	3
16	(Italy) M Viola	4	4
ITF	(Russia) I Gakhov	6	6
(Netherlands) J Sels	1	1
2	(Czech Republic) J Veselý	6	6

Third round
WC	(Czech Republic) J Lehečka	4	2
(Italy) J Sinner	6	6
ITF	(Russia) I Gakhov	6^{6}	3
2	(Czech Republic) J Veselý	7^{8}	6

Quarterfinals
(Italy) J Sinner	6	7^{7}
2	(Czech Republic) J Veselý	4	6^{4}
