= 2019 Prosperita Open – Doubles =

Doubles
- 2019 Prosperita Open

Final
- Champions: (Switzerland) Luca Margaroli (Slovakia) Filip Polášek
- Runners-up: (Netherlands) Thiemo de Bakker (Netherlands) Tallon Griekspoor
- Score: 6–4, 2–6, [10–8]

Events
Singles	Doubles
- Prosperita Open

Attila Balázs and Gonçalo Oliveira were the defending champions but chose not to defend their title.

Luca Margaroli and Filip Polášek won the title after defeating Thiemo de Bakker and Tallon Griekspoor 6–4, 2–6, [10–8] in the final.

== Seeds ==
1. (Australia) Rameez Junaid / (Belarus) Andrei Vasilevski (first round)
2. (Switzerland) Luca Margaroli / (Slovakia) Filip Polášek (champions)
3. (Bosnia and Herzegovina) Tomislav Brkić / (Serbia) Nikola Čačić (quarterfinals)
4. (Italy) Julian Ocleppo / (Italy) Andrea Vavassori (first round)

== Draw ==
Key

- Q = Qualifier
- WC = Wild card
- LL = Lucky loser
- Alt = Alternate
- ITF = ITF entry
- PR = Protected ranking
- SR = Special ranking
- SE = Special exempt
- JE = Junior exempt
- JR = Junior Accelerator Programme entrant
- CO = College Accelerator Programme entrant
- NG = Next Gen Accelerator Program entrant
- w/o = Walkover
- r = Retired
- d = Defaulted

First round
1	(Australia) R Junaid (Belarus) A Vasilevski	6	3	[9]
(Netherlands) T de Bakker (Netherlands) T Griekspoor	4	6	[11]
(Poland) K Drzewiecki (Poland) S Walków	3	6	[5]
(France) B Bonzi (Netherlands) M Vervoort	6	4	[10]
3	(Bosnia and Herzegovina) T Brkić (Serbia) N Čačić	6^{3}	6	[10]
ITF	(Italy) R Bonadio (Finland) E Ruusuvuori	7^{7}	1	[8]
WC	(Czech Republic) M Gengel (Czech Republic) J Šátral	6	7
WC	(Poland) Daniel Kossek (Poland) M Kowalczyk	3	5
WC	(Czech Republic) V Kopřiva (Czech Republic) D Poljak	6	7
(Poland) T Bednarek (Czech Republic) V Šafránek	4	5
ITF	(Germany) Peter Heller (Australia) S Puodziunas	6	6
4	(Italy) J Ocleppo (Italy) A Vavassori	4	4
(Canada) S Diez (Estonia) J Zopp
(Austria) D Novak (Czech Republic) A Pavlásek	w/o
(Russia) I Gakhov (Russia) A Pavlioutchenkov
2	(Switzerland) L Margaroli (Slovakia) F Polášek	w/o

Quarterfinals
(Netherlands) T de Bakker (Netherlands) T Griekspoor	6	7^{9}
(France) B Bonzi (Netherlands) M Vervoort	3	6^{7}
3	(Bosnia and Herzegovina) T Brkić (Serbia) N Čačić	6^{3}	0
WC	(Czech Republic) M Gengel (Czech Republic) J Šátral	7^{7}	6
WC	(Czech Republic) V Kopřiva (Czech Republic) D Poljak	6^{4}	1
ITF	(Germany) P Heller (Australia) S Puodziunas	7^{7}	6
(Austria) D Novak (Czech Republic) A Pavlásek	3	4
2	(Switzerland) L Margaroli (Slovakia) F Polášek	6	6

Semifinals
(Netherlands) T de Bakker (Netherlands) T Griekspoor	6	6
WC	(Czech Republic) M Gengel (Czech Republic) J Šátral	4	2
ITF	(Germany) P Heller (Australia) S Puodziunas	4	6^{4}
2	(Switzerland) L Margaroli (Slovakia) F Polášek	6	7^{7}

Final
(Netherlands) T de Bakker (Netherlands) T Griekspoor	4	6	[8]
2	(Switzerland) L Margaroli (Slovakia) F Polášek	6	2	[10]
