= 2015 Prosperita Open =

- Date: 27 April – 3 May
- Edition: 12th
- Draw: 32S / 16D
- Prize money: €42,500
- Surface: Clay
- Location: Ostrava, Czech Republic

Champions

Singles
- (Spain) Íñigo Cervantes

Doubles
- (Slovakia) Andrej Martin / (Chile) Hans Podlipnik Castillo
- Prosperita Open

The 2015 Prosperita Open was a professional tennis tournament played on clay courts. It was the 12th edition of the tournament which was part of the 2015 ATP Challenger Tour. It took place in Ostrava, Czech Republic between 27 April and 3 May.

== Singles main-draw entrants ==
=== Seeds ===
Country	Player	Rank^{1}	Seed
FRA	Lucas Pouille	98	1
GBR	James Ward	106	2
ESP	Daniel Muñoz de la Nava	146	3
CRO	Mate Delić	159	4
BEL	Maxime Authom	175	5
SVK	Andrej Martin	187	6
UKR	Denys Molchanov	189	7
ESP	Rubén Ramírez Hidalgo	198	8

- ^{1} Rankings are as of April 20, 2015

=== Other entrants ===
The following players received wildcards into the singles main draw:

- (Czech Republic) Zdeněk Kolář
- (Czech Republic) Patrik Rikl
- (Czech Republic) David Poljak
- (Czech Republic) Dominik Kellovský

The following players received entry from the qualifying draw:

- (Czech Republic) Dušan Lojda
- (Czech Republic) Marek Michalička
- (Poland) Grzegorz Panfil
- (Austria) Pascal Brunner

== Champions ==
=== Singles ===
- (Spain) Íñigo Cervantes def. (Czech Republic) Adam Pavlásek, 7–6^{(7–5)}, 6–4

=== Doubles ===
- (Slovakia) Andrej Martin / (Chile) Hans Podlipnik Castillo def. (Czech Republic) Roman Jebavý / (Czech Republic) Jan Šátral, 4–6, 7–5, [10–1]
