= 2016 Prosperita Open =

- Date: 25 April – 1 May
- Edition: 13th
- Draw: 32S / 16D
- Prize money: €42,500
- Surface: Clay
- Location: Ostrava, Czech Republic

Champions

Singles
- (France) Constant Lestienne

Doubles
- (Netherlands) Sander Arends / (Austria) Tristan-Samuel Weissborn
- Prosperita Open

The 2016 Prosperita Open was a professional tennis tournament played on clay courts. It was the 13th edition of the tournament which was part of the 2016 ATP Challenger Tour. It took place in Ostrava, Czech Republic between 25 April and 1 May.

== Singles main-draw entrants ==
=== Seeds ===
Country	Player	Rank^{1}	Seed
CZE	Adam Pavlásek	108	1
SLO	Blaž Rola	160	2
EST	Jürgen Zopp	162	3
SRB	Peđa Krstin	164	4
BEL	Kimmer Coppejans	171	5
CHI	Hans Podlipnik	210	6
BLR	Uladzimir Ignatik	216	7
FRA	David Guez	222	8

- ^{1} Rankings are as of April 18, 2016

=== Other entrants ===
The following players received wildcards into the singles main draw:

- (Czech Republic) Zdeněk Kolář
- (Czech Republic) David Poljak
- (Slovakia) Dominik Sproch
- (Serbia) Janko Tipsarević

The following players received entry from the qualifying draw:

- (Czech Republic) Marek Michalička
- (Slovakia) Andrej Martin
- (Czech Republic) Jaroslav Pospíšil
- (Italy) Stefano Napolitano

== Champions ==
=== Singles ===
- (France) Constant Lestienne def. (Czech Republic) Zdeněk Kolář, 6–7^{(5–7)}, 6–1, 6–2

=== Doubles ===
- (Netherlands) Sander Arends / (Austria) Tristan-Samuel Weissborn def. (Czech Republic) Lukáš Dlouhý / (Chile) Hans Podlipnik, 7–6^{(10–8)}, 6–7^{(4–7)}, [10–5]
