= 2014 Prosperita Open =

- Date: 28 April – 4 May
- Edition: 11th
- Draw: 32S / 16D
- Prize money: €85,000+H
- Surface: Clay
- Location: Ostrava, Czech Republic

Champions

Singles
- (Russia) Andrey Kuznetsov

Doubles
- (Russia) Andrey Kuznetsov / (Spain) Adrián Menéndez Maceiras
- Prosperita Open

The 2014 Prosperita Open was a professional tennis tournament played on clay courts. It was the eleventh edition of the tournament which was part of the 2014 ATP Challenger Tour. It took place in Ostrava, Czech Republic between 28 April and 4 May 2014.

== Singles main-draw entrants ==
=== Seeds ===
Country	Player	Rank	Seed
CZE	Radek Štěpánek	41	1
FRA	Stéphane Robert	89	2
ESP	Pere Riba	95	3
SVN	Blaž Rola	111	4
AUT	Andreas Haider-Maurer	113	5
CZE	Jan Hájek	125	6
BIH	Damir Džumhur	130	7
RUS	Andrey Kuznetsov	131	8

=== Other entrants ===
The following players received wildcards into the singles main draw:

- (Czech Republic) Radek Štěpánek
- (Czech Republic) Jakub Lustyk
- (Czech Republic) Jan Minář
- (Czech Republic) Adam Pavlásek

The following players received entry from the qualifying draw:

- (Czech Republic) Marek Michalička
- (Italy) Riccardo Ghedin
- (Ukraine) Artem Smirnov
- (Russia) Aslan Karatsev

== Doubles main-draw entrants ==
=== Seeds ===
Country	Player	Country	Player	Rank	Seed
GER	Philipp Marx	SVK	Michal Mertiňák	176	1
ITA	Riccardo Ghedin	ITA	Claudio Grassi	275	2
ESP	Gerard Granollers	ESP	Pere Riba	437	3
SVK	Andrej Martin	CZE	Jaroslav Pospíšil	572	4

=== Other entrants ===
The following pairs received wildcards into the doubles main draw:

- (Czech Republic) Marek Michalička / (Czech Republic) Jan Minář
- (Czech Republic) Jakub Lustyk / (Czech Republic) David Novak
- (Czech Republic) Dominik Kellovský / (Czech Republic) Pavel Šnobel

== Champions ==
=== Singles ===
- (Russia) Andrey Kuznetsov def. (Slovakia) Miloslav Mečíř Jr., 2–6, 6–3, 6–0

=== Doubles ===
- (Russia) Andrey Kuznetsov / (Spain) Adrián Menéndez Maceiras def. (Italy) Alessandro Motti / (Italy) Matteo Viola, 4–6, 6–3, [10–8]
