= 2020 Prosperita Open – Singles =

Singles
- 2020 Prosperita Open

Final
- Champion: (Russia) Aslan Karatsev
- Runner-up: (Germany) Oscar Otte
- Score: 6–4, 6–2

Events
Singles	Doubles
- Prosperita Open

Kamil Majchrzak was the defending champion but chose not to defend his title.

Aslan Karatsev won the title after defeating Oscar Otte 6–4, 6–2 in the final.

== Seeds ==
1. (Switzerland) Henri Laaksonen (second round)
2. (Belarus) Ilya Ivashka (quarterfinals)
3. (South Korea) Chung Hyeon (first round)
4. (Latvia) Ernests Gulbis (second round)
5. (Slovakia) Martin Kližan (first round)
6. (France) Arthur Rinderknech (withdrew)
7. (Canada) Steven Diez (second round)
8. (Ukraine) Sergiy Stakhovsky (second round, retired)

== Draw ==
Key

- Q = Qualifier
- WC = Wild card
- LL = Lucky loser
- Alt = Alternate
- ITF = ITF entry
- PR = Protected ranking
- SR = Special ranking
- SE = Special exempt
- JE = Junior exempt
- JR = Junior Accelerator Programme entrant
- CO = College Accelerator Programme entrant
- NG = Next Gen Accelerator Program entrant
- w/o = Walkover
- r = Retired
- d = Defaulted

=== Finals ===
Semifinals
(Netherlands) Botic van de Zandschulp	3	3
SE	(Russia) Aslan Karatsev	6	6
(Germany) Oscar Otte	6	6
SE	(Netherlands) Tallon Griekspoor	2	4

Final
SE	(Russia) Aslan Karatsev	6	6
(Germany) Oscar Otte	4	2

=== Top half ===
First round
1	(Switzerland) H Laaksonen	7	6
(Canada) B Schnur	5	1
WC	(Finland) O Virtanen	5	4
(Netherlands) B van de Zandschulp	7	6
(Slovakia) L Lacko	7^{8}	6
(Slovakia) F Horanský	6^{6}	2
(Portugal) F Ferreira Silva	7^{7}	6
5	(Slovakia) M Kližan	6^{4}	2
4	(Latvia) E Gulbis	6	6
WC	(Czech Republic) D Svrčina	4	1
SE	(Russia) A Karatsev	6	6
WC	(Czech Republic) T Macháč	4	4
Q	(Germany) M Moraing	7	6
(Argentina) R Olivo	5	0
(Canada) P Polansky	6	4	3
8	(Ukraine) S Stakhovsky	4	6	6

Second round
1	(Switzerland) H Laaksonen	3	2
(Netherlands) B van de Zandschulp	6	6
(Slovakia) L Lacko	6	7
(Portugal) F Ferreira Silva	4	5
4	(Latvia) E Gulbis	1	4
SE	(Russia) A Karatsev	6	6
Q	(Germany) M Moraing	6	6^{4}	4
8	(Ukraine) S Stakhovsky	1	7^{7}	0^{r}

Quarterfinals
(Netherlands) B van de Zandschulp	5	6	6
(Slovakia) L Lacko	7	3	1
SE	(Russia) A Karatsev	6	6
Q	(Germany) M Moraing	3	3

Semifinals
(Netherlands) B van de Zandschulp	3	3
SE	(Russia) A Karatsev	6	6

=== Bottom half ===
First round
LL	(Tunisia) M Jaziri	3	5
Q	(Czech Republic) Z Kolář	6	7
(Russia) R Safiullin	3	6	3
(Kazakhstan) D Popko	6	1	6
(Australia) A Vukic	6	4	3
(Germany) O Otte	3	6	6
(Czech Republic) L Rosol	2	6	6
3	(South Korea) Hy Chung	6	4	0
7	(Canada) S Diez	6	6
(Germany) R Molleker	1	2
SE	(Netherlands) T Griekspoor	4	6	7^{7}
(Netherlands) R Haase	6	4	6^{3}
Q	(Switzerland) M-A Hüsler	6	4	5
(Serbia) V Troicki	3	6	7
Q	(Czech Republic) V Kopřiva	4	6^{4}
2	(Belarus) I Ivashka	6	7^{7}

Second round
Q	(Czech Republic) Z Kolář	5	6	7
(Kazakhstan) D Popko	7	4	5
(Germany) O Otte	6	6
(Czech Republic) L Rosol	2	0
7	(Canada) S Diez	6	2	4
SE	(Netherlands) T Griekspoor	4	6	6
(Serbia) V Troicki	3	5
2	(Belarus) I Ivashka	6	7

Quarterfinals
Q	(Czech Republic) Z Kolář	1	1
(Germany) O Otte	6	6
SE	(Netherlands) T Griekspoor	7^{7}	6
2	(Belarus) I Ivashka	6^{3}	3

Semifinals
(Germany) O Otte	6	6
SE	(Netherlands) T Griekspoor	2	4
