= 2013 Prosperita Open – Singles =

Singles
- 2013 Prosperita Open

Final
- Champion: (Czech Republic) Jiří Veselý
- Runner-up: (Belgium) Steve Darcis
- Score: 6–4, 6–4

Events
Singles	Doubles
← 2012 ·	Prosperita Open	· 2014 →

Jonathan Dasnières de Veigy was the defending champion but played at the 2013 Tennis Napoli Cup instead.
Jiří Veselý won the final by defeating Steve Darcis 6–4, 6–4.

== Seeds ==
1. (Czech Republic) Lukáš Rosol (semifinals)
2. (Slovenia) Aljaž Bedene (first round)
3. (France) Guillaume Rufin (first round)
4. (Czech Republic) Jan Hájek (quarterfinals)
5. (Austria) Andreas Haider-Maurer (quarterfinals)
6. (Belgium) Steve Darcis (final)
7. (Belgium) Olivier Rochus (quarterfinals)
8. (Belarus) Uladzimir Ignatik (second round)

== Draw ==
=== Key ===
- Q = Qualifier
- WC = Wild card
- LL = Lucky loser
- Alt = Alternate
- SE = Special exempt
- PR = Protected ranking
- ITF = ITF entry
- JE = Junior exempt
- w/o = Walkover
- r = Retired
- d = Defaulted
- SR = Special ranking

=== Finals ===
Semifinals
1/WC	(Czech Republic) Lukáš Rosol	6	6^{3}	4
6	(Belgium) Steve Darcis	4	7^{7}	6
Q	(Slovakia) Miloslav Mečíř Jr.	2	4
(Czech Republic) Jiří Veselý	6	6

Final
6	(Belgium) Steve Darcis	4	4
(Czech Republic) Jiří Veselý	6	6

=== Top half ===
First round
1/WC	(Czech Republic) L Rosol	4	6	6
WC	(Czech Republic) A Pavlásek	6	3	4
(Germany) T Pütz	7	6
Q	(Croatia) F Škugor	5	4
(Croatia) N Mektić	6^{2}	5
(Canada) S Diez	7^{7}	3^{r}
WC	(Czech Republic) Tomáš Papík	2	4
8	(Belarus) U Ignatik	6	6
4	(Czech Republic) J Hájek	6	6
(Bosnia and Herzegovina) M Bašić	3	4
(Bosnia and Herzegovina) A Šetkić	6	6
(Netherlands) B Westerhof	2	3
(Romania) V Crivoi	1	3
(Czech Republic) I Minář	6	6
(France) S Robert	3	7^{7}	4
6	(Belgium) S Darcis	6	6^{5}	6

Second round
1/WC	(Czech Republic) L Rosol	6	7^{7}
(Germany) T Pütz	4	6^{1}
(Croatia) N Mektić	6	6
8	(Belarus) U Ignatik	1	1
4	(Czech Republic) J Hájek	6	7
(Bosnia and Herzegovina) A Šetkić	1	5
(Czech Republic) I Minář	1	0
6	(Belgium) S Darcis	6	6

Quarterfinals
1/WC	(Czech Republic) L Rosol	6	6
(Croatia) N Mektić	1	0
4	(Czech Republic) J Hájek	6^{3}	2
6	(Belgium) S Darcis	7^{7}	6

Semifinals
1/WC	(Czech Republic) L Rosol	6	6^{3}	4
6	(Belgium) S Darcis	4	7^{7}	6

=== Bottom half ===
First round
7	(Belgium) O Rochus	6	6
Q	(Germany) P Torebko	1	2
(Bosnia and Herzegovina) D Džumhur	6	6
WC	(Chile) N Massú	1	1
(Czech Republic) J Hernych	6	6^{4}	4
(France) J Eysseric	1	7^{7}	6
Q	(Slovakia) M Mečíř	6	6
3	(France) G Rufin	3	4
5	(Austria) A Haider-Maurer	7^{8}	6
(Slovakia) A Martin	6^{6}	3
(Czech Republic) J Mertl	1	4
(Russia) T Gabashvili	6	6
(Czech Republic) D Lojda	5	4
(Czech Republic) J Veselý	7	6
Q	(Czech Republic) J Pospíšil	6	6
2	(Slovenia) A Bedene	4	1

Second round
7	(Belgium) O Rochus	6	3	6
(Bosnia and Herzegovina) D Džumhur	4	6	2
(France) J Eysseric	3	3
Q	(Slovakia) M Mečíř	6	6
5	(Austria) A Haider-Maurer	7^{10}	4	6
(Russia) T Gabashvili	6^{8}	6	2
(Czech Republic) J Veselý	6^{3}	6	6
Q	(Czech Republic) J Pospíšil	7^{7}	3	3

Quarterfinals
7	(Belgium) O Rochus	2	6	5
Q	(Slovakia) M Mečíř	6	4	7
5	(Austria) A Haider-Maurer	6^{3}	6	3
(Czech Republic) J Veselý	7^{7}	2	6

Semifinals
Q	(Slovakia) M Mečíř	2	4
(Czech Republic) J Veselý	6	6
