= 2022 Ostra Group Open =

- Date: 25 April – 1 May
- Edition: 19th
- Surface: Clay
- Location: Ostrava, Czech Republic

Champions

Singles
- (France) Evan Furness

Doubles
- (Austria) Alexander Erler / (Austria) Lucas Miedler
- Ostra Group Open

The 2022 Ostra Group Open was a professional tennis tournament played on clay courts. It was the 19th edition of the tournament which was part of the 2022 ATP Challenger Tour. It took place in Ostrava, Czech Republic between 25 April and 1 May.

== Singles main-draw entrants ==
=== Seeds ===
Country	Player	Rank^{1}	Seed
FRA	Corentin Moutet	112	1
GER	Mats Moraing	125	2
TPE	Tseng Chun-hsin	127	3
AUS	Aleksandar Vukic	128	4
CZE	Zdeněk Kolář	137	5
AUT	Dennis Novak	148	6
AUT	Jurij Rodionov	162	7
KAZ	Dmitry Popko	171	8

- ^{1} Rankings are as of 18 April 2022.

=== Other entrants ===
The following players received wildcards into the singles main draw:

- (Czech Republic) Jonáš Forejtek
- (Slovakia) Miloš Karol
- (Czech Republic) Jakub Menšík

The following players received entry into the singles main draw as alternates:

- (Hungary) Attila Balázs
- (Ukraine) Vitaliy Sachko
- (Czech Republic) Dalibor Svrčina

The following players received entry from the qualifying draw:

- (France) Evan Furness
- (Poland) Daniel Michalski
- (United States) Emilio Nava
- (Czech Republic) Pavel Nejedlý
- (Germany) Mats Rosenkranz
- (Czech Republic) Lukáš Rosol

The following players received entry as lucky losers:

- (Slovakia) Lukáš Klein
- (Austria) Lucas Miedler

== Champions ==
=== Singles ===
- (France) Evan Furness def. (United Kingdom) Ryan Peniston 4–6, 7–6^{(8–6)}, 6–1.

=== Doubles ===
- (Austria) Alexander Erler / (Austria) Lucas Miedler def. (United States) Hunter Reese / (Netherlands) Sem Verbeek 7–6^{(7–5)}, 7–5.
