= 2022 Ostra Group Open – Doubles =

Doubles
- 2022 Ostra Group Open

Final
- Champions: (Austria) Alexander Erler (Austria) Lucas Miedler
- Runners-up: (United States) Hunter Reese (Netherlands) Sem Verbeek
- Score: 7–6^{(7–5)}, 7–5

Events
Singles	Doubles
- Ostra Group Open

Marc Polmans and Sergiy Stakhovsky were the defending champions but chose not to defend their title.

Alexander Erler and Lucas Miedler won the title after defeating Hunter Reese and Sem Verbeek 7–6^{(7–5)}, 7–5 in the final.

== Seeds ==
1. (Austria) Alexander Erler / (Austria) Lucas Miedler (champions)
2. (United States) Hunter Reese / (Netherlands) Sem Verbeek (final)
3. (United States) Nicholas Monroe / (Brazil) Fernando Romboli (first round)
4. (Netherlands) Sander Arends / (Netherlands) David Pel (quarterfinals)

== Draw ==
Key

- Q = Qualifier
- WC = Wild card
- LL = Lucky loser
- Alt = Alternate
- ITF = ITF entry
- PR = Protected ranking
- SR = Special ranking
- SE = Special exempt
- JE = Junior exempt
- JR = Junior Accelerator Programme entrant
- CO = College Accelerator Programme entrant
- NG = Next Gen Accelerator Program entrant
- w/o = Walkover
- r = Retired
- d = Defaulted

First round
1	(Austria) A Erler (Austria) L Miedler	6	6
(Czech Republic) M Gengel (Czech Republic) L Rosol	4	4
3	(United States) N Monroe (Brazil) F Romboli	2	4
(France) E Furness (United Kingdom) R Peniston	6	6
(Poland) P Matuszewski (Ukraine) V Sachko	3	6	[10]
Alt	B Bobrov (Kazakhstan) D Popko	6	3	[7]
(Uzbekistan) S Fayziev (Kazakhstan) G Lomakin	2	2
(Czech Republic) A Pavlásek (Slovakia) I Zelenay	6	6
WC	(Czech Republic) J Forejtek (Czech Republic) D Poljak	5	2
4	(Netherlands) S Arends (Netherlands) D Pel	7	6
(Czech Republic) Z Kolář (New Zealand) A Sitak	2	4
(Poland) K Drzewiecki (Poland) S Walków	6	6
Alt	(Czech Republic) Ondřej Horák (Czech Republic) Pavel Nejedlý	2	6	[4]
2	(United States) H Reese (Netherlands) S Verbeek	6	2	[10]

Quarterfinals
1	(Austria) A Erler (Austria) L Miedler	6	6
WC	(Czech Republic) J Jermář (Slovakia) M Karol	0	4
(France) E Furness (United Kingdom) R Peniston	4	1
(Poland) P Matuszewski (Ukraine) V Sachko	6	6
(Czech Republic) A Pavlásek (Slovakia) I Zelenay	6	7^{7}
4	(Netherlands) S Arends (Netherlands) D Pel	4	6^{4}
(Poland) K Drzewiecki (Poland) S Walków	4	4
2	(United States) H Reese (Netherlands) S Verbeek	6	6

Semifinals
1	(Austria) A Erler (Austria) L Miedler	w/o
(Poland) P Matuszewski (Ukraine) V Sachko
(Czech Republic) A Pavlásek (Slovakia) I Zelenay	2	6^{2}
2	(United States) H Reese (Netherlands) S Verbeek	6	7^{7}

Final
1	(Austria) A Erler (Austria) L Miedler	7^{7}	7
2	(United States) H Reese (Netherlands) S Verbeek	6^{5}	5
