= 2015 Prosperita Open – Singles =

Singles
- 2015 Prosperita Open

Final
- Champion: (Spain) Íñigo Cervantes
- Runner-up: (Czech Republic) Adam Pavlásek
- Score: 7–6^{(7–5)}, 6–4

Events
Singles	Doubles
- Prosperita Open

Andrey Kuznetsov was the defending champion, but he did not participate this year.

Íñigo Cervantes won the title, defeating Adam Pavlásek in the final, 7–6^{(7–5)}, 6–4.

== Seeds ==
1. (France) Lucas Pouille (quarterfinals)
2. (United Kingdom) James Ward (second round)
3. (Spain) Daniel Muñoz de la Nava (semifinals)
4. (Croatia) Mate Delić (second round)
5. (Belgium) Maxime Authom (second round)
6. (Slovakia) Andrej Martin (quarterfinals)
7. (Ukraine) Denys Molchanov (first round)
8. (Spain) Rubén Ramírez Hidalgo (semifinals)

== Draw ==
Key

- Q = Qualifier
- WC = Wild card
- LL = Lucky loser
- Alt = Alternate
- ITF = ITF entry
- PR = Protected ranking
- SR = Special ranking
- SE = Special exempt
- JE = Junior exempt
- JR = Junior Accelerator Programme entrant
- CO = College Accelerator Programme entrant
- NG = Next Gen Accelerator Program entrant
- w/o = Walkover
- r = Retired
- d = Defaulted

=== Finals ===
Semifinals
(Czech Republic) Adam Pavlásek	6	5	7
3	(Spain) Daniel Muñoz de la Nava	4	7	5
8	(Spain) Rubén Ramírez Hidalgo	3	6	5
(Spain) Íñigo Cervantes	6	3	7

Final
(Czech Republic) Adam Pavlásek	6^{5}	4
(Spain) Íñigo Cervantes	7^{7}	6

=== Top half ===
First round
1	(France) L Pouille	6	7
WC	(Czech Republic) Z Kolář	3	5
(Belgium) A De Greef	5	7^{7}	6
(Czech Republic) J Pospíšil	7	6^{3}	3
WC	(Czech Republic) P Rikl	3	5
(Czech Republic) A Pavlásek	6	7
(Germany) P Torebko	1	6	3
5	(Belgium) M Authom	6	4	6
3	(Spain) D Muñoz de la Nava	6	2	7^{7}
Q	(Czech Republic) M Michalička	4	6	6^{2}
(Serbia) L Djere	6	6
Q	(Poland) G Panfil	2	1
(Chile) H Podlipnik-Castillo	6^{5}	7	6
(Belarus) U Ignatik	7^{7}	5	2
(France) E Couacaud	7	6
7	(Ukraine) D Molchanov	5	3

Second round
1	(France) L Pouille	7	6
(Belgium) A De Greef	5	4
(Czech Republic) A Pavlásek	4	6	6
5	(Belgium) M Authom	6	2	3
3	(Spain) D Muñoz de la Nava	7^{7}	6
(Serbia) L Djere	6^{1}	4
(Chile) H Podlipnik-Castillo	6	6
(France) E Couacaud	3	1

Quarterfinals
1	(France) L Pouille	4	6^{3}
(Czech Republic) A Pavlásek	6	7^{7}
3	(Spain) D Muñoz de la Nava	7	6
(Chile) H Podlipnik-Castillo	5	1

Semifinals
(Czech Republic) A Pavlásek	6	5	7
3	(Spain) D Muñoz de la Nava	4	7	5

=== Bottom half ===
First round
8	(Spain) R Ramírez Hidalgo	6	7
(Slovakia) M Mečíř Jr.	1	5
Q	(Austria) Pascal Brunner	4	3
(France) M Bourque	6	6
(Slovakia) J Kovalík	6	6^{5}	6
(Italy) T Fabbiano	1	7^{7}	1
WC	(Czech Republic) D Poljak	2	4
4	(Croatia) M Delić	6	6
6	(Slovakia) A Martin	6	6
(Czech Republic) J Mertl	3	4
(Belgium) Y Mertens	3	4
(Argentina) P Cachin	6	6
WC	(Czech Republic) D Kellovský	1	1
(Spain) I Cervantes	6	6
Q	(Czech Republic) D Lojda	5	6	4
2	(United Kingdom) J Ward	7	4	6

Second round
8	(Spain) R Ramírez Hidalgo	6	7
(France) M Bourque	0	5
(Slovakia) J Kovalík	6	7
4	(Croatia) M Delić	2	5
6	(Slovakia) A Martin	6	6
(Argentina) P Cachin	1	4
(Spain) I Cervantes	6	6
2	(United Kingdom) J Ward	4	2

Quarterfinals
8	(Spain) R Ramírez Hidalgo	7	6
(Slovakia) J Kovalík	5	4
6	(Slovakia) A Martin	4	4
(Spain) I Cervantes	6	6

Semifinals
8	(Spain) R Ramírez Hidalgo	3	6	5
(Spain) I Cervantes	6	3	7
