= 2015 Prosperita Open – Doubles =

Doubles
- 2015 Prosperita Open

Final
- Champions: (Slovakia) Andrej Martin (Chile) Hans Podlipnik-Castillo
- Runners-up: (Czech Republic) Roman Jebavý (Czech Republic) Jan Šátral
- Score: 4–6, 7–5, [10–1]

Events
Singles	Doubles
- Prosperita Open

Andrey Kuznetsov and Adrián Menéndez-Maceiras were the defending champions, but they did not participate this year.

Andrej Martin and Hans Podlipnik-Castillo won the title, defeating Roman Jebavý and Jan Šátral in the final, 4–6, 7–5, [10–1].

== Seeds ==
1. (Philippines) Ruben Gonzales / (United Kingdom) Darren Walsh (semifinals)
2. (Russia) Michail Elgin / (Ukraine) Denys Molchanov (semifinals)
3. (Slovakia) Andrej Martin / (Chile) Hans Podlipnik-Castillo (champions)
4. (Czech Republic) Roman Jebavý / (Czech Republic) Jan Šátral (final)

== Draw ==
Key

- Q = Qualifier
- WC = Wild card
- LL = Lucky loser
- Alt = Alternate
- ITF = ITF entry
- PR = Protected ranking
- SR = Special ranking
- SE = Special exempt
- JE = Junior exempt
- JR = Junior Accelerator Programme entrant
- CO = College Accelerator Programme entrant
- NG = Next Gen Accelerator Program entrant
- w/o = Walkover
- r = Retired
- d = Defaulted

First round
1	(Philippines) R Gonzales (United Kingdom) D Walsh	6	6
(Czech Republic) J Mertl (Czech Republic) A Pavlásek	2	3
WC	(Czech Republic) Libor Salaba (Czech Republic) Robin Staněk	4	6^{4}
(Slovakia) M Mečíř Jr. (Czech Republic) Dominik Süč	6	7^{7}
4	(Czech Republic) R Jebavý (Czech Republic) J Šátral	6	6
WC	(Czech Republic) Filip Doležel (Czech Republic) Petr Michnev	3	4
(Croatia) M Delić (Poland) G Panfil	4	4
(Argentina) P Cachin (Spain) I Cervantes	6	6
(Belarus) U Ignatik (Czech Republic) M Michalička	6	1	[10]
(Czech Republic) D Kellovský (Czech Republic) J Pospíšil	3	6	[7]
(Serbia) L Djere (Czech Republic) D Lojda	1	1
3	(Slovakia) A Martin (Chile) H Podlipnik-Castillo	6	6
WC	(Czech Republic) Z Kolář (Czech Republic) D Poljak	5	6^{5}
(Slovakia) J Kovalík (Germany) P Torebko	7	7^{7}
(Belgium) M Authom (Belgium) Y Mertens	4	2
2	(Russia) M Elgin (Ukraine) D Molchanov	6	6

Quarterfinals
1	(Philippines) R Gonzales (United Kingdom) D Walsh	6	6
(Slovakia) M Mečíř Jr. (Czech Republic) D Süč	0	3
4	(Czech Republic) R Jebavý (Czech Republic) J Šátral	6	6
(Argentina) P Cachin (Spain) I Cervantes	2	1
(Belarus) U Ignatik (Czech Republic) M Michalička	3	4
3	(Slovakia) A Martin (Chile) H Podlipnik-Castillo	6	6
(Slovakia) J Kovalík (Germany) P Torebko	2	2
2	(Russia) M Elgin (Ukraine) D Molchanov	6	6

Semifinals
1	(Philippines) R Gonzales (United Kingdom) D Walsh	4	3
4	(Czech Republic) R Jebavý (Czech Republic) J Šátral	6	6
3	(Slovakia) A Martin (Chile) H Podlipnik-Castillo	6	2	[10]
2	(Russia) M Elgin (Ukraine) D Molchanov	4	6	[6]

Final
4	(Czech Republic) R Jebavý (Czech Republic) J Šátral	6	5	[1]
3	(Slovakia) A Martin (Chile) H Podlipnik-Castillo	4	7	[10]
