= 2023 Ostra Group Open – Singles =

Singles
- 2023 Ostra Group Open

Final
- Champion: (Czech Republic) Zdeněk Kolář
- Runner-up: (Hungary) Máté Valkusz
- Score: 6–3, 6–2

Events
Singles	Doubles
- Ostra Group Open

Evan Furness was the defending champion but retired from his first round match against Gaël Monfils.

Zdeněk Kolář won the title after defeating Máté Valkusz 6–3, 6–2 in the final.

== Seeds ==
1. (United Kingdom) Ryan Peniston (first round)
2. Ivan Gakhov (second round)
3. (Czech Republic) Vít Kopřiva (second round)
4. (France) Geoffrey Blancaneaux (second round)
5. (Chile) Alejandro Tabilo (withdrew)
6. (Italy) Riccardo Bonadio (semifinals)
7. (Ukraine) Oleksii Krutykh (second round)
8. (Bosnia and Herzegovina) Damir Džumhur (quarterfinals)
9. (Czech Republic) Dalibor Svrčina (second round)

== Draw ==
Key

- Q = Qualifier
- WC = Wild card
- LL = Lucky loser
- Alt = Alternate
- ITF = ITF entry
- PR = Protected ranking
- SR = Special ranking
- SE = Special exempt
- JE = Junior exempt
- JR = Junior Accelerator Programme entrant
- CO = College Accelerator Programme entrant
- NG = Next Gen Accelerator Program entrant
- w/o = Walkover
- r = Retired
- d = Defaulted

=== Finals ===
Semifinals
Alt	(Japan) Shintaro Mochizuki	3	6	2
(Czech Republic) Zdeněk Kolář	6	2	6
(Hungary) Máté Valkusz	6	6
6	(Italy) Riccardo Bonadio	0	4

Final
(Czech Republic) Zdeněk Kolář	6	6
(Hungary) Máté Valkusz	3	2

=== Top half ===
First round
1	(United Kingdom) R Peniston	2	3
WC	(Czech Republic) J Menšík	6	6
Q	(Argentina) G Andreozzi	6	4	1
Alt	(Japan) S Mochizuki	2	6	6
WC	(France) G Monfils	6	2
(France) E Furness	3	0^{r}
Q	(Germany) H Squire	3	0
8	(Bosnia and Herzegovina) D Džumhur	6	6
3	(Czech Republic) V Kopřiva	7	4	6
(France) D Added	5	6	3
(Serbia) M Zekić	6^{9}	2
(Czech Republic) Z Kolář	7^{11}	6
(Belgium) G Onclin	4	6	6
Alt	(Ukraine) V Sachko	6	4	2
Q	(Germany) R Molleker	0	6	1
9	(Czech Republic) D Svrčina	6	2	6

Second round
WC	(Czech Republic) J Menšík	6	2	6^{4}
Alt	(Japan) S Mochizuki	1	6	7^{7}
WC	(France) G Monfils	3	4
8	(Bosnia and Herzegovina) D Džumhur	6	6
3	(Czech Republic) V Kopřiva	2	1
(Czech Republic) Z Kolář	6	6
(Belgium) G Onclin	6	6
9	(Czech Republic) D Svrčina	0	3

Quarterfinals
Alt	(Japan) S Mochizuki	5	6	6
8	(Bosnia and Herzegovina) D Džumhur	7	2	3
(Czech Republic) Z Kolář	6	2	6
(Belgium) G Onclin	2	6	4

Semifinals
Alt	(Japan) S Mochizuki	3	6	2
(Czech Republic) Z Kolář	6	2	6

=== Bottom half ===
First round
7	(Ukraine) O Krutykh	6	6
(Romania) ND Ionel	1	2
(Belgium) R Collignon	4	4
(Portugal) F Ferreira Silva	6	6
Q	(Czech Republic) P Rikl	3	6	1
(Hungary) M Valkusz	6	4	6
(Spain) P Martín Tiffon	4	3
4	(France) G Blancaneaux	6	6
6	(Italy) R Bonadio	6	6
Q	(Spain) Àlex Martí Pujolràs	4	3
Q	(Uzbekistan) K Sultanov	2	0
(France) H Mayot	6	6
WC	(Czech Republic) J Veselý	6	6^{7}	6
(Italy) L Giustino	3	7^{9}	2
(Czech Republic) L Rosol	4	6	1
2	I Gakhov	6	3	6

Second round
7	(Ukraine) O Krutykh	1	4
(Portugal) F Ferreira Silva	6	6
(Hungary) M Valkusz	6	6
4	(France) G Blancaneaux	3	4
6	(Italy) R Bonadio	6	7^{7}
(France) H Mayot	1	6^{3}
WC	(Czech Republic) J Veselý	2	6	6
2	I Gakhov	6	3	4

Quarterfinals
(Portugal) F Ferreira Silva	6^{4}	1
(Hungary) M Valkusz	7^{7}	6
6	(Italy) R Bonadio	6^{5}	6	6
WC	(Czech Republic) J Veselý	7^{7}	3	4

Semifinals
(Hungary) M Valkusz	6	6
6	(Italy) R Bonadio	0	4
