= Stefan Latinović =

Serbian tennis player (born 1999)

- Country (sports): Serbia
- Residence: Belgrade, Serbia
- Born: 22 November 1999 (age 26) Belgrade, Serbia, FR Yugoslavia
- Height: 1.96 m (6 ft 5 in)
- Turned pro: 2023
- Plays: Right-handed (two-handed backhand)
- College: Wichita State University (2018–2022); Louisiana State University (2022–2024)
- Prize money: US $77,588

Singles
- Career record: 0–0
- Career titles: 0
- Highest ranking: No. 934 (28 July 2025)
- Current ranking: No. 1,327 (19 October 2026)

Doubles
- Career record: 2–1
- Career titles: 0
- Highest ranking: No. 85 (19 October 2026)
- Current ranking: No. 85 (19 October 2026)

Team competitions
- Davis Cup: 1–0 (Sin. 0–0, Dbs. 1–0)
- Last updated on: 19 October 2026.

Stefan Latinović (Serbian Cyrillic: Стефан Латиновић; born 22 November 1999) is a Serbian professional tennis player. He achieved career-high ATP doubles rankings of world No. 85 achieved on 19 October 2026 and a singles ranking of world No. 934 on 28 July 2025.

== Career ==
=== College tennis ===
Latinović played college tennis for Wichita State University from the 2018–19 through the 2021–22 seasons. During his time there, he was named to the Athletic Director's Honor Roll three times (Spring 2019, Fall 2021, and Spring 2022), earned ITA Scholar-Athlete honors in 2020, and was selected to the Academic All-Conference Team in 2022.

He transferred to LSU, where he competed during the 2022–23 and 2023–24 seasons. While at LSU, he earned multiple academic and athletic honors, including ITA Scholar-Athlete recognition, selection to the SEC Academic Honor Roll, and All-Louisiana Second Team honors. He completed his collegiate career with a degree in Information Systems and Decision Science.

=== 2023: ATP Challenger debut ===
Latinović made his ATP Challenger Tour debut in doubles at the 2023 Coosa Valley Open, partnering with American player Nick Watson. The pair received a wildcard entry and lost in the first round of the main draw.

=== 2025-2026: Challenger doubles titles, top 100 and Davis Cup debut ===
In March 2025, in his second ATP Challenger appearance, he reached the quarterfinals of the 2025 Crete Challenger II in Greece, playing doubles alongside German player Marko Topo.

Two months later, Latinović captured his first ATP Challenger doubles title at the Ostra Group Open, partnering with Czech player Jan Jermář. In the final, they defeated the New Zealand duo of Finn Reynolds and James Watt in straight sets.

Latinović made his Davis Cup debut for Serbia on September 20, 2026, during a World Group I tie against Lithuania in Niš. Partnering with Miomir Kecmanović, he secured the decisive third point for Serbia by defeating the Lithuanian duo of Edas Butvilas and Vilius Gaubas in a three-set match (7–6, 3–6, 6–3). This victory earned Serbia a spot in the Davis Cup qualifiers for the following year.

On October 05, 2026, Latinović achieved a career-high ATP doubles ranking of No. 87 after winning the Porto Open title in Porto alongside Croatian partner Mili Poljičak.

== Personal life ==
Latinović is the son of Dragan Latinović, a tennis coach, and Snežana Latinović, a Master of Engineering Management, and has one sister, Jovana, who played professional junior tennis and now competes in American collegiate tennis in NCAA Division I for the Grambling State Tigers in Louisiana. His favorite tennis player is Juan Martín del Potro.

== ATP Challenger and ITF Tour finals ==
=== Singles: 1 (runner-up) ===
Legend Challengers (0–0) ITF WTT (0–1)	Titles by surface Hard (0–0) Clay (0–1)

Result	W–L	Date	Tournament	Tier	Surface	Opponent	Score
Loss	0–1	Sep 2024	M15 Pirot, Serbia	WTT	Clay	(Dominican Republic) Roberto Cid Subervi	2–6, 4–6

=== Doubles: 29 (15 titles, 14 runner-ups) ===
Legend Challengers (8–5) ITF WTT (7–9)	Titles by surface Hard (6–3) Clay (9–11)

Result	W–L	Date	Tournament	Tier	Surface	Partner	Opponents	Score
Loss	0–1	Jun 2023	M25 Kiseljak, Bosnia and Herzegovina	WTT	Clay	(Serbia) Andrej Radojičić	(Australia) Matthew Romios (Australia) Brandon Walkin	2–6, 3–6
Loss	0–2	Jul 2023	M25+H Kassel, Germany	WTT	Clay	(Bolivia) Murkel Dellien	(Czech Republic) Jiri Barnat (Czech Republic) Patrik Rikl	4–6, 4–6
Loss	0–3	Jun 2024	M15 Kuršumlijska Banja, Serbia	WTT	Clay	(France) Luka Pavlovic	(Serbia) Kristijan Juhas; Marat Sharipov	6–2, 2–6, [1–10]
Win	1–3	Jun 2024	M15 Kuršumlijska Banja, Serbia	WTT	Clay	(North Macedonia) Obrad Markovski	(Czech Republic) Jan Hrazdil (Czech Republic) Vaclav Safranek	1–6, 7–6^{(7–4)}, [10–7]
Loss	1–4	Jul 2024	M15 Kuršumlijska Banja, Serbia	WTT	Clay	(Serbia) Novak Novaković	(Italy) Gregorio Biondolillo (Venezuela) Ignacio Parisca	4–6, 6–4, [3–10]
Win	2–4	Jul 2024	M15 Kuršumlijska Banja, Serbia	WTT	Clay	(Bulgaria) Dinko Dinev	(France) Paul Barbier Gazeu (France) Benjamin Pietri	7–6^{(7–5)}, 5–7, [10–6]
Loss	2–5	Jul 2024	M15 Kuršumlijska Banja, Serbia	WTT	Clay	Marat Sharipov	(Argentina) Leonardo Aboian (Argentina) Lautaro Agustin Falabella	4–6, 6–2, [6–10]
Loss	2–6	Aug 2024	M15 Pirot, Serbia	WTT	Clay	(Morocco) Younes Lalami Laaroussi	(Croatia) Admir Kalender (Serbia) Vuk Rađenović	5–7, 6–0, [8–10]
Loss	2–7	Sep 2024	M15 Pirot, Serbia	WTT	Clay	(Bosnia and Herzegovina) Vladan Tadić	(Croatia) Kristian Tumbas Kajgo; Pavel Verbin	7–5, 4–6, [3–10]
Win	3–7	Oct 2024	M25 Sharm El-Sheikh, Egypt	WTT	Hard	Pavel Verbin	(United Kingdom) Ben Jones (United Kingdom) Mark Whitehouse	7–6^{(7–5)}, 7–5
Loss	3–8	Nov 2024	M15 Sharm El-Sheikh, Egypt	WTT	Hard	(Chinese Taipei) Yi Jui Lo	(Czech Republic) Jan Hrazdil (Czech Republic) Denis Petak	7–6^{(7–4)}, 3–6, [3–10]
Win	4–8	Nov 2024	M15 Sharm El-Sheikh, Egypt	WTT	Hard	(Chinese Taipei) Yi Jui Lo	(Czech Republic) Daniel Blazka (Czech Republic) Marek Gengel	4–6, 6–3, [10–4]
Win	5–8	Feb 2025	M25 Vila Real de Santo António, Portugal	WTT	Hard	(Croatia) Mili Poljičak	(Uzbekistan) Sergey Fomin; Ivan Gakhov	6–4, 4–6, [10–6]
Win	6–8	Mar 2025	M15 Heraklion, Greece	WTT	Hard	(Poland) Szymon Kielan	(Poland) Martyn Pawelski (Poland) Kacper Zuk	6–4, 6–3
Win	7–8	May 2025	Ostrava, Czech Republic	Challenger	Clay	(Czech Republic) Jan Jermář	(New Zealand) Finn Reynolds (New Zealand) James Watt	7–5, 6–3
Loss	7–9	May 2025	M25 Kuršumlijska Banja, Serbia	WTT	Clay	(Czech Republic) Jan Jermář	(United States) Sekou Bangoura (Israel) Roy Stepanov	6–7^{(4–7)}, 6–2, [6–10]
Win	8–9	Jun 2025	M25 Belgrade, Serbia	WTT	Clay	(Serbia) Vuk Rađenović	(Sweden) Erik Grevelius (Sweden) Adam Heinonen	6–0, 6–3
Win	9–9	Aug 2025	Sofia, Bulgaria	Challenger	Clay	Marat Sharipov	(Slovakia) Miloš Karol (Finland) Patrik Niklas-Salminen	6–3, 2–6, [13–11]
Loss	9–10	Oct 2025	Braga, Portugal	Challenger	Clay	(Bulgaria) Alexander Donski	(Brazil) Marcelo Demoliner (Brazil) Orlando Luz	5–7, 7–5, [7–10]
Loss	9–11	Oct 2025	Monastir, Tunisia	Challenger	Hard	(Croatia) Luka Mikrut	(France) Corentin Denolly (France) Max Westphal	5–7, 6–2, [6–10]
Loss	9–12	Feb 2026	Koblenz, Germany	Challenger	Hard (i)	(Czech Republic) Filip Duda	(Belgium) Tibo Colson (Netherlands) Thijmen Loof	6–7 ^{(1–7)}, 6–3, [6–10]
Win	10–12	Feb 2026	Lugano, Switzerland	Challenger	Hard (i)	(Ukraine) Vitaliy Sachko	(Bosnia and Herzegovina) Mirza Bašić (Bosnia and Herzegovina) Nerman Fatić	6–3, 6–4
Win	11–12	Mar 2026	Kigali, Rwanda	Challenger	Clay	(France) Luka Pavlovic	(India) Siddhant Banthia (Bulgaria) Alexander Donski	7–6^{(7–5)}, 7–6^{(7–2)}
Win	12–12	Mar 2026	Barletta, Italy	Challenger	Clay	(Czech Republic) Filip Duda	(Slovakia) Miloš Karol (Ukraine) Vitaliy Sachko	7–6^{(7–4)}, 6–7^{(6–8)}, [13–11]
Loss	12–13	May 2026	Istanbul, Turkey	Challenger	Clay	(Czech Republic) Filip Duda	(United States) George Goldhoff (United States) Theodore Winegar	5–7, 2–6
Loss	12–14	Jun 2026	Târgu Mureș, Romania	Challenger	Clay	(Czech Republic) Michael Vrbenský	(Netherlands) Thijmen Loof (Japan) Kaito Uesugi	6–2, 6–7^{(0–7)}, [6–10]
Win	13–14	Jul 2026	San Marino, San Marino	Challenger	Clay	(Croatia) Mili Poljičak	(France) Arthur Reymond (France) Luca Sanchez	7–6^{(7–5)}, 6–3
Win	14–14	Sep 2026	Genoa, Italy	Challenger	Clay	(Croatia) Mili Poljičak	(Croatia) Admir Kalender (Croatia) Nino Serdarušić	7–6^{(7–1)}, 6–7^{(3–7)}, [10–6]
Win	15–14	Sep 2026	Porto, Portugal	Challenger	Hard	(Croatia) Mili Poljičak	(Bulgaria) Alexander Donski (Poland) Filip Pieczonka	6–3, 6–4
