= 2020 Prosperita Open – Doubles =

Doubles
- 2020 Prosperita Open

Final
- Champions: (New Zealand) Artem Sitak (Slovakia) Igor Zelenay
- Runners-up: (Poland) Karol Drzewiecki (Poland) Szymon Walków
- Score: 7–5, 6–4

Events
Singles	Doubles
- Prosperita Open

Luca Margaroli and Filip Polášek were the defending champions but chose not to defend their title.

Artem Sitak and Igor Zelenay won the title after defeating Karol Drzewiecki and Szymon Walków 7–5, 6–4 in the final.

== Seeds ==
1. (New Zealand) Artem Sitak / (Slovakia) Igor Zelenay (champions)
2. (Sweden) André Göransson / (Portugal) Gonçalo Oliveira (first round)
3. (Netherlands) Sander Arends / (Netherlands) David Pel (semifinals)
4. (Belarus) Andrei Vasilevski / (Spain) David Vega Hernández (quarterfinals)

== Draw ==
Key

- Q = Qualifier
- WC = Wild card
- LL = Lucky loser
- Alt = Alternate
- ITF = ITF entry
- PR = Protected ranking
- SR = Special ranking
- SE = Special exempt
- JE = Junior exempt
- JR = Junior Accelerator Programme entrant
- CO = College Accelerator Programme entrant
- NG = Next Gen Accelerator Program entrant
- w/o = Walkover
- r = Retired
- d = Defaulted

First round
1	(New Zealand) A Sitak (Slovakia) I Zelenay	6	6
WC	(Czech Republic) A Paulson (Czech Republic) D Svrčina	4	2
(Canada) S Diez (Belarus) I Ivashka	6^{3}	6^{5}
WC	(Czech Republic) Z Kolář (Czech Republic) L Rosol	7^{7}	7^{7}
3	(Netherlands) S Arends (Netherlands) D Pel	6	3	[10]
(Finland) H Heliövaara (Ukraine) D Molchanov	3	6	[6]
WC	(Slovakia) L Klein (Czech Republic) M Vrbenský	4	7^{10}	[10]
(Slovakia) M Kližan (Serbia) V Troicki	6	6^{8}	[8]
(Netherlands) T Griekspoor (Netherlands) R Haase	6	6
(India) S Balaji (Russia) T Gabashvili	4	0
(Mexico) H Hach Verdugo (Netherlands) B van de Zandschulp	3	4
4	(Belarus) A Vasilevski (Spain) D Vega Hernández	6	6
(Croatia) I Sabanov (Croatia) M Sabanov	5	1
(Sweden) R Lindstedt (Ukraine) S Stakhovsky	7	6
(Poland) K Drzewiecki (Poland) S Walków	6	7^{7}
2	(Sweden) A Göransson (Portugal) G Oliveira	4	6^{4}

Quarterfinals
1	(New Zealand) A Sitak (Slovakia) I Zelenay	6	6^{5}	[10]
WC	(Czech Republic) Z Kolář (Czech Republic) L Rosol	3	7^{7}	[7]
3	(Netherlands) S Arends (Netherlands) D Pel	6	6
WC	(Slovakia) L Klein (Czech Republic) M Vrbenský	4	3
(Netherlands) T Griekspoor (Netherlands) R Haase	4	6	[10]
4	(Belarus) A Vasilevski (Spain) D Vega Hernández	6	4	[7]
(Sweden) R Lindstedt (Ukraine) S Stakhovsky	6	3	[5]
(Poland) K Drzewiecki (Poland) S Walków	4	6	[10]

Semifinals
1	(New Zealand) A Sitak (Slovakia) I Zelenay	7^{7}	1	[10]
3	(Netherlands) S Arends (Netherlands) D Pel	6^{4}	6	[8]
(Netherlands) T Griekspoor (Netherlands) R Haase	3	7^{7}	[10]
(Poland) K Drzewiecki (Poland) S Walków	6	6^{2}	[12]

Final
1	(New Zealand) A Sitak (Slovakia) I Zelenay	7	6
(Poland) K Drzewiecki (Poland) S Walków	5	4
