= 2025 Ostra Group Open =

- Date: 28 April – 4 May
- Edition: 22nd
- Surface: Clay
- Location: Ostrava, Czech Republic

Champions

Singles
- (Hungary) Zsombor Piros

Doubles
- (Czech Republic) Jan Jermář / (Serbia) Stefan Latinović
- Ostra Group Open

The 2025 Ostra Group Open was a professional tennis tournament played on clay courts. It was the 22nd edition of the tournament which was part of the 2025 ATP Challenger Tour. It took place in Ostrava, Czech Republic between 28 April and 4 May 2025.

== Singles main-draw entrants ==
=== Seeds ===
Country	Player	Rank^{1}	Seed
CZE	Vít Kopřiva	95	1
DEN	Elmer Møller	114	2
FRA	Adrian Mannarino	124	3
CZE	Dalibor Svrčina	127	4
FRA	Harold Mayot	160	5
HKG	Coleman Wong	169	6
SVK	Lukáš Klein	173	7
LIB	Hady Habib	174	8

- ^{1} Rankings are as of 21 April 2025.

=== Other entrants ===
The following players received wildcards into the singles main draw:

- (Czech Republic) Jan Jermář
- (Czech Republic) Jan Kumstát
- (Czech Republic) Maxim Mrva

The following players received entry from the qualifying draw:

- (Czech Republic) Petr Brunclík
- (Slovakia) Norbert Gombos
- (Netherlands) Max Houkes
- (Spain) Àlex Martínez
- (Germany) Rudolf Molleker
- (Netherlands) Jelle Sels

The following player received entry as a lucky loser:

- (Ukraine) Vitaliy Sachko

== Champions ==
=== Singles ===
- (Hungary) Zsombor Piros def. (Lebanon) Hady Habib 6–3, 6–2.

=== Doubles ===
- (Czech Republic) Jan Jermář / (Serbia) Stefan Latinović def. (New Zealand) Finn Reynolds / (New Zealand) James Watt 7–5, 6–3.
