= 2013 Prosperita Open – Doubles =

Doubles
- 2013 Prosperita Open

Final
- Champions: (Belgium) Steve Darcis (Belgium) Olivier Rochus
- Runners-up: (Poland) Tomasz Bednarek (Poland) Mateusz Kowalczyk
- Score: 7–5, 7–5

Events
Singles	Doubles
- Prosperita Open

Radu Albot and Teymuraz Gabashvili were the defending champions but Albot decided not to participate.
Gabashvili was scheduled to play alongside Lukáš Rosol but they withdrew due to Rosol's right bicep injury.
Steve Darcis and Olivier Rochus defeated Tomasz Bednarek and Mateusz Kowalczyk 7–5, 7–5 in the final to win the title.

== Seeds ==
1. (Poland) Tomasz Bednarek / (Poland) Mateusz Kowalczyk (final)
2. (Czech Republic) Jaroslav Pospíšil / (Slovakia) Igor Zelenay (quarterfinals)
3. (Slovenia) Aljaž Bedene / (Croatia) Marin Draganja (quarterfinals)
4. (Croatia) Nikola Mektić / (Croatia) Franko Škugor (first round)

== Draw ==
Key

- Q = Qualifier
- WC = Wild card
- LL = Lucky loser
- Alt = Alternate
- ITF = ITF entry
- PR = Protected ranking
- SR = Special ranking
- SE = Special exempt
- JE = Junior exempt
- JR = Junior Accelerator Programme entrant
- CO = College Accelerator Programme entrant
- NG = Next Gen Accelerator Program entrant
- w/o = Walkover
- r = Retired
- d = Defaulted

=== Draw ===
First round
1	(Poland) T Bednarek (Poland) M Kowalczyk	6	6
(Belarus) U Ignatik (Slovakia) A Martin	3	0
WC	(Czech Republic) J Levinský (Czech Republic) I Minář	3	5
(Germany) T Pütz (Germany) A Satschko	6	7
3	(Slovenia) A Bedene (Croatia) M Draganja	7^{7}	6^{4}	[11]
Alt	(Romania) V Crivoi (France) J Eysseric	6^{3}	7^{7}	[9]
(Czech Republic) D Lojda (Bosnia and Herzegovina) A Šetkić	5	5
(France) S Robert (New Zealand) A Sitak	7	7
(Czech Republic) J Mertl (Netherlands) B Westerhof	6	6
WC	(Czech Republic) D Kellovský (Czech Republic) D Poljak	2	1
(Belgium) S Darcis (Belgium) O Rochus	6	6
4	(Croatia) N Mektić (Croatia) F Škugor	3	4
Alt	(United States) Adham El-Effendi (United Kingdom) D Walsh	0	7^{7}	[4]
WC	(Czech Republic) A Pavlásek (Czech Republic) J Veselý	6	6^{5}	[10]
(France) A Michon (France) G Rufin	3	3
2	(Czech Republic) J Pospíšil (Slovakia) I Zelenay	6	6

Quarterfinals
1	(Poland) T Bednarek (Poland) M Kowalczyk	3	6	[11]
(Germany) T Pütz (Germany) A Satschko	6	4	[9]
3	(Slovenia) A Bedene (Croatia) M Draganja	6	5	[4]
(France) S Robert (New Zealand) A Sitak	0	7	[10]
(Czech Republic) J Mertl (Netherlands) B Westerhof	4	6	[8]
(Belgium) S Darcis (Belgium) O Rochus	6	3	[10]
WC	(Czech Republic) A Pavlásek (Czech Republic) J Veselý	6	6
2	(Czech Republic) J Pospíšil (Slovakia) I Zelenay	1	3

Semifinals
1	(Poland) T Bednarek (Poland) M Kowalczyk	6	6
(France) S Robert (New Zealand) A Sitak	1	3
(Belgium) S Darcis (Belgium) O Rochus	6	1	[10]
WC	(Czech Republic) A Pavlásek (Czech Republic) J Veselý	1	6	[8]

Final
1	(Poland) T Bednarek (Poland) M Kowalczyk	5	5
(Belgium) S Darcis (Belgium) O Rochus	7	7
