= 2021 Ostrava Challenger – Singles =

Singles
- 2021 Ostrava Challenger

Final
- Champion: (France) Benjamin Bonzi
- Runner-up: (Argentina) Renzo Olivo
- Score: 6–4, 6–4

Events
Singles	Doubles
- Ostrava Challenger

Aslan Karatsev was the defending champion but chose not to defend his title.

Benjamin Bonzi won the title after defeating Renzo Olivo 6–4, 6–4 in the final.

== Seeds ==
1. (France) Grégoire Barrère (second round)
2. (Brazil) Thiago Seyboth Wild (first round)
3. (France) Benjamin Bonzi (champion)
4. (France) Arthur Rinderknech (semifinals, retired)
5. (Australia) Marc Polmans (quarterfinals)
6. (United States) Maxime Cressy (first round)
7. (Chile) Alejandro Tabilo (second round)
8. (Egypt) Mohamed Safwat (first round)

== Draw ==
Key

- Q = Qualifier
- WC = Wild card
- LL = Lucky loser
- Alt = Alternate
- ITF = ITF entry
- PR = Protected ranking
- SR = Special ranking
- SE = Special exempt
- JE = Junior exempt
- JR = Junior Accelerator Programme entrant
- CO = College Accelerator Programme entrant
- NG = Next Gen Accelerator Program entrant
- w/o = Walkover
- r = Retired
- d = Defaulted

=== Finals ===
Semifinals
(Argentina) Renzo Olivo	5
4	(France) Arthur Rinderknech	4^{r}
3	(France) Benjamin Bonzi	6	4	7^{7}
(Sweden) Elias Ymer	3	6	6^{5}

Final
(Argentina) Renzo Olivo	4	4
3	(France) Benjamin Bonzi	6	6

=== Top half ===
First round
1	(France) G Barrère	7^{11}	7
Q	(Germany) O Otte	6^{9}	5
(Czech Republic) Z Kolář	6	4	2
(Argentina) TM Etcheverry	1	6	6
Q	(Austria) L Miedler	3	6	4
(Argentina) R Olivo	6	3	6
(Netherlands) R Haase	2	6	4
7	(Chile) A Tabilo	6	4	6
4	(France) A Rinderknech	6	6
(France) M Bourgue	4	0
(Canada) B Schnur	6	1	6
Alt	(Chile) MT Barrios Vera	2	6	1
(Canada) P Polansky	3	5
Q	(Slovakia) L Klein	6	7
(Czech Republic) L Rosol	6^{4}	6	7
8	(Egypt) M Safwat	7^{7}	2	5

Second round
1	(France) G Barrère	6	4	3
(Argentina) TM Etcheverry	3	6	6
(Argentina) R Olivo	6	6
7	(Chile) A Tabilo	2	3
4	(France) A Rinderknech	7	6
(Canada) B Schnur	5	4
Q	(Slovakia) L Klein	7^{7}	4	6
(Czech Republic) L Rosol	6^{2}	6	2

Quarterfinals
(Argentina) TM Etcheverry	4	4
(Argentina) R Olivo	6	6
4	(France) A Rinderknech	3	6	6
Q	(Slovakia) L Klein	6	3	4

Semifinals
(Argentina) R Olivo	5
4	(France) A Rinderknech	4^{r}

=== Bottom half ===
First round
5	(Australia) M Polmans	6	6
(Slovenia) B Kavčič	3	3
(Uzbekistan) D Istomin	0	6	6
(Slovakia) L Lacko	6	1	4
(France) C Lestienne	2	0
WC	(Czech Republic) J Lehečka	6	6
(Russia) R Safiullin	2	1
3	(France) B Bonzi	6	6
6	(United States) M Cressy	6	6^{5}	4
(Sweden) E Ymer	3	7^{7}	6
WC	(Czech Republic) P Rikl	4	2
(Ukraine) S Stakhovsky	6	6
(Argentina) S Báez	6	6
WC	(Czech Republic) M Krumich	2	2
Q	(Slovakia) A Molčan	6	6
2	(Brazil) T Seyboth Wild	1	4

Second round
5	(Australia) M Polmans	6	6
(Uzbekistan) D Istomin	3	0
WC	(Czech Republic) J Lehečka	3	4
3	(France) B Bonzi	6	6
(Sweden) E Ymer	6	6
(Ukraine) S Stakhovsky	1	2
(Argentina) S Báez	6	1	2^{r}
Q	(Slovakia) A Molčan	4	6	4

Quarterfinals
5	(Australia) M Polmans	4	2
3	(France) B Bonzi	6	6
(Sweden) E Ymer	7	6
Q	(Slovakia) A Molčan	5	3

Semifinals
3	(France) B Bonzi	6	4	7^{7}
(Sweden) E Ymer	3	6	6^{5}
