= 2013 Prosperita Open =

- Date: 29 April – 5 May
- Edition: 10th
- Draw: 32S / 16D
- Prize money: €85,000+H
- Surface: Clay
- Location: Ostrava, Czech Republic

Champions

Singles
- (Czech Republic) Jiří Veselý

Doubles
- (Belgium) Steve Darcis / (Belgium) Olivier Rochus
- Prosperita Open

The 2013 Prosperita Open was a professional tennis tournament played on clay courts. It was the tenth edition of the tournament which was part of the 2013 ATP Challenger Tour. It took place in Ostrava, Czech Republic between 29 April and 5 May 2013.

== Singles main draw entrants ==
=== Seeds ===
Country	Player	Rank^{1}	Seed
CZE	Lukáš Rosol	48	1
SVN	Aljaž Bedene	82	2
FRA	Guillaume Rufin	88	3
CZE	Jan Hájek	95	4
AUT	Andreas Haider-Maurer	111	5
BEL	Steve Darcis	116	6
BEL	Olivier Rochus	145	7
BLR	Uladzimir Ignatik	147	8

- ^{1} Rankings are as of April 22, 2013.

=== Other entrants ===
The following players received wildcards into the singles main draw:

- (Chile) Nicolas Massú
- (Czech Republic) Tomáš Papík
- (Czech Republic) Adam Pavlásek
- (Czech Republic) Lukáš Rosol

The following players received entry from the qualifying draw:

- (Slovakia) Miloslav Mečíř Jr.
- (Czech Republic) Jaroslav Pospíšil
- (Croatia) Franko Škugor
- (Germany) Peter Torebko

== Doubles main draw entrants ==
=== Seeds ===
Country	Player	Country	Player	Rank^{1}	Seed
POL	Tomasz Bednarek	POL	Mateusz Kowalczyk	192	1
CZE	Jaroslav Pospíšil	SVK	Igor Zelenay	225	2
SLO	Aljaž Bedene	CRO	Marin Draganja	300	3
CRO	Nikola Mektić	CRO	Franko Škugor	362	4

- ^{1} Rankings as of April 22, 2013.

=== Other entrants ===
The following pairs received wildcards into the doubles main draw:

- (Czech Republic) Dominik Kellovský / (Czech Republic) David Poljak
- (Czech Republic) Jaroslav Levinský / (Czech Republic) Ivo Minář
- (Czech Republic) Adam Pavlásek / (Czech Republic) Jiří Veselý

The following pairs received entry as an alternate:

- (Romania) Victor Crivoi / (France) Jonathan Eysseric
- (United States) Adam El-Effendi / (United Kingdom) Darren Walsh

== Champions ==
=== Singles ===
- (Czech Republic) Jiří Veselý def. (Belgium) Steve Darcis, 6–4, 6–4

=== Doubles ===
- (Belgium) Steve Darcis / (Belgium) Olivier Rochus def. (Poland) Tomasz Bednarek / (Poland) Mateusz Kowalczyk, 7–5, 7–5
