= 2023 Ostra Group Open =

- Date: 24 – 30 April
- Edition: 20th
- Surface: Clay
- Location: Ostrava, Czech Republic

Champions

Singles
- (Czech Republic) Zdeněk Kolář

Doubles
- (United States) Robert Galloway / (Mexico) Miguel Ángel Reyes-Varela
- Ostra Group Open

The 2023 Ostra Group Open was a professional tennis tournament played on clay courts. It was the 20th edition of the tournament which was part of the 2023 ATP Challenger Tour. It took place in Ostrava, Czech Republic between 24 and 30 April 2023.

== Singles main-draw entrants ==
=== Seeds ===
Country	Player	Rank^{1}	Seed
GBR	Ryan Peniston	158	1
	Ivan Gakhov	162	2
CZE	Vít Kopřiva	165	3
FRA	Geoffrey Blancaneaux	175	4
~~CHI~~	~~Alejandro Tabilo~~	~~176~~	~~5~~
ITA	Riccardo Bonadio	179	6
UKR	Oleksii Krutykh	180	7
BIH	Damir Džumhur	202	8
CZE	Dalibor Svrčina	203	9

- ^{1} Rankings are as of 17 April 2023.

=== Other entrants ===
The following players received wildcards into the singles main draw:

- (Czech Republic) Jakub Menšík
- (France) Gaël Monfils
- (Czech Republic) Jiří Veselý

The following players received entry into the singles main draw as alternates:

- (Japan) Shintaro Mochizuki
- (Ukraine) Vitaliy Sachko

The following players received entry from the qualifying draw:

- (Argentina) Guido Andreozzi
- (Spain) Àlex Martí Pujolràs
- (Germany) Rudolf Molleker
- (Czech Republic) Patrik Rikl
- (Germany) Henri Squire
- (Uzbekistan) Khumoyun Sultanov

== Champions ==
=== Singles ===
- (Czech Republic) Zdeněk Kolář def. (Hungary) Máté Valkusz 6–3, 6–2.

=== Doubles ===
- (United States) Robert Galloway / (Mexico) Miguel Ángel Reyes-Varela def. (Argentina) Guido Andreozzi / (Argentina) Guillermo Durán 7–5, 7–6^{(7–5)}.
