= 2021 Ostrava Challenger =

- Date: 26 April – 2 May
- Edition: 18th
- Surface: Clay
- Location: Ostrava, Czech Republic

Champions

Singles
- (France) Benjamin Bonzi

Doubles
- (Australia) Marc Polmans / (Ukraine) Sergiy Stakhovsky
- Ostrava Challenger

The 2021 Ostra Group Open was a professional tennis tournament played on clay courts. It was the 18th edition of the tournament which was part of the 2021 ATP Challenger Tour. It took place in Ostrava, Czech Republic between 26 April and 2 May.

== Singles main-draw entrants ==
=== Seeds ===
Country	Player	Rank^{1}	Seed
FRA	Grégoire Barrère	118	1
BRA	Thiago Seyboth Wild	124	2
FRA	Benjamin Bonzi	127	3
FRA	Arthur Rinderknech	129	4
AUS	Marc Polmans	148	5
USA	Maxime Cressy	156	6
CHI	Alejandro Tabilo	162	7
EGY	Mohamed Safwat	164	8

- ^{1} Rankings are as of 19 April 2021.

=== Other entrants ===
The following players received wildcards into the singles main draw:

- (Czech Republic) Martin Krumich
- (Czech Republic) Jiří Lehečka
- (Czech Republic) Patrik Rikl

The following player received entry into the singles main draw as an alternate:

- (Chile) Marcelo Tomás Barrios Vera

The following players received entry from the qualifying draw:

- (Slovakia) Lukáš Klein
- (Austria) Lucas Miedler
- (Slovakia) Alex Molčan
- (Germany) Oscar Otte

== Champions ==
=== Singles ===
- (France) Benjamin Bonzi def. (Argentina) Renzo Olivo 6–4, 6–4.

=== Doubles ===
- (Australia) Marc Polmans / (Ukraine) Sergiy Stakhovsky def. (Czech Republic) Andrew Paulson / (Czech Republic) Patrik Rikl 7–6^{(7–4)}, 3–6, [10–7].
