= 2019 Prosperita Open =

- Date: 29 April – 5 May
- Edition: 16th
- Draw: 48S / 16D
- Surface: Clay
- Location: Ostrava, Czech Republic

Champions

Singles
- (Poland) Kamil Majchrzak

Doubles
- (Switzerland) Luca Margaroli / (Slovakia) Filip Polášek
- Prosperita Open

The 2019 Prosperita Open was a professional tennis tournament played on clay courts. It was the 16th edition of the tournament which was part of the 2019 ATP Challenger Tour. It took place in Ostrava, Czech Republic between 29 April and 5 May.

== Singles main-draw entrants ==
=== Seeds ===
Country	Player	Rank^{1}	Seed
RSA	Lloyd Harris	90	1
CZE	Jiří Veselý	94	2
ESP	Marcel Granollers	110	3
POL	Kamil Majchrzak	121	4
AUT	Dennis Novak	122	5
ITA	Stefano Travaglia	154	6
EST	Jürgen Zopp	177	7
BEL	Arthur De Greef	179	8
GER	Dominik Köpfer	183	9
ITA	Stefano Napolitano	189	10
NED	Tallon Griekspoor	192	11
CRO	Viktor Galović	198	12
CZE	Adam Pavlásek	208	13
SVK	Norbert Gombos	222	14
NED	Thiemo de Bakker	225	15
ITA	Matteo Viola	230	16

- ^{1} Rankings are as of 22 April 2019.

=== Other entrants ===
The following players received wildcards into the singles main draw:

- (Czech Republic) Marek Gengel
- (Czech Republic) Jiří Lehečka
- (Czech Republic) Tomáš Macháč
- (Czech Republic) David Poljak
- (Czech Republic) Dalibor Svrčina

The following player received entry into the singles main draw using a protected ranking:

- (Spain) Pere Riba

The following player received entry into the singles main draw as an alternate:

- (Italy) Andrea Vavassori

The following players received entry into the singles main draw using their ITF World Tennis Ranking:

- (Italy) Riccardo Bonadio
- (Russia) Ivan Gakhov
- (Germany) Peter Heller
- (Czech Republic) Vít Kopřiva
- (Russia) Alexander Zhurbin

The following players received entry from the qualifying draw:

- (Italy) Enrico Dalla Valle
- (Czech Republic) Jonáš Forejtek

== Champions ==
=== Singles ===
- (Poland) Kamil Majchrzak def. (Italy) Jannik Sinner 6–1, 6–0.

=== Doubles ===
- (Switzerland) Luca Margaroli / (Slovakia) Filip Polášek def. (Netherlands) Thiemo de Bakker / (Netherlands) Tallon Griekspoor 6–4, 2–6, [10–8].
