= Evan Furness =

French tennis player (born 1998)

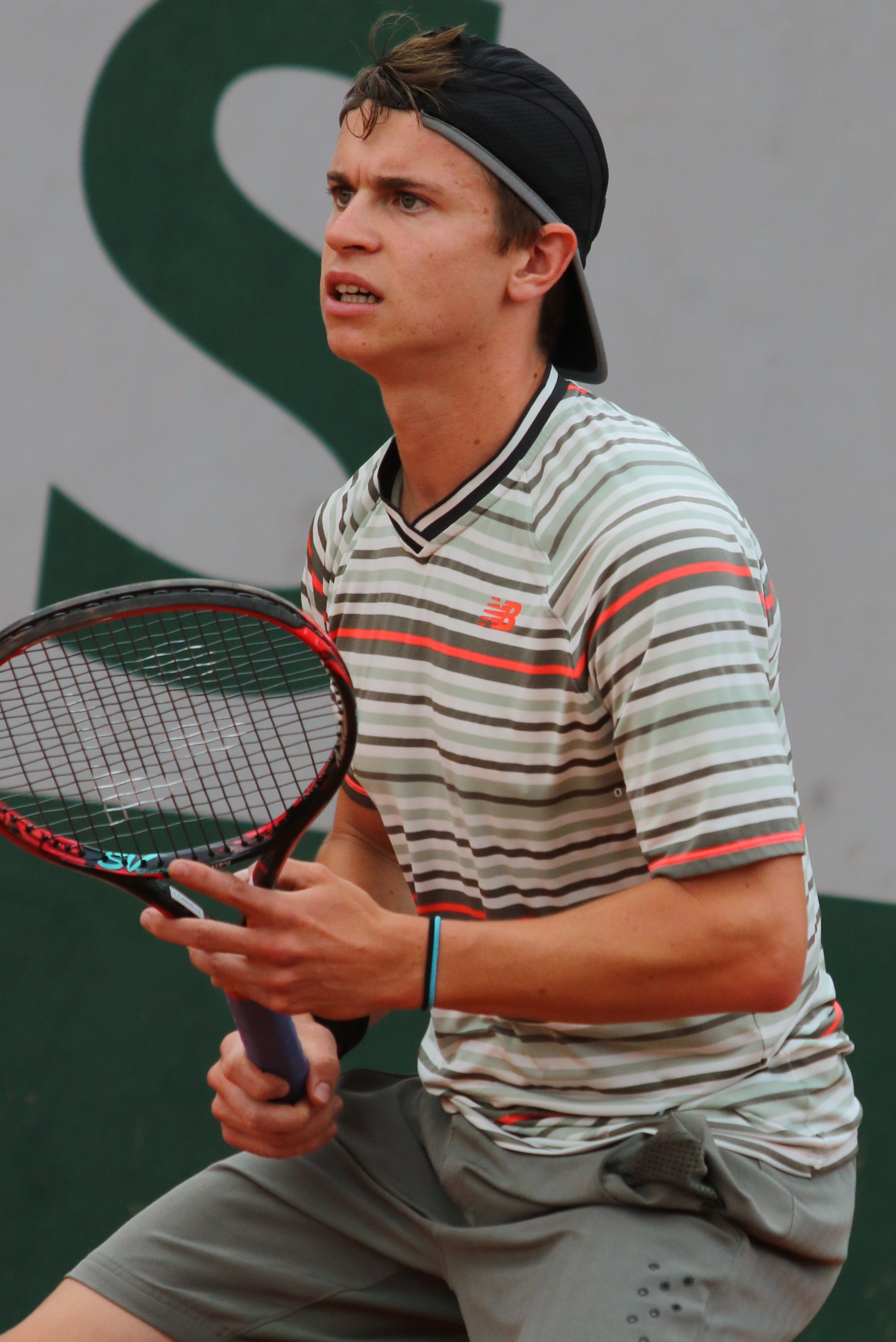
- Furness at the 2018 French Open
- Country (sports): France
- Residence: Pontivy, France
- Born: 13 August 1998 (age 28) Pontivy, France
- Height: 1.73 m (5 ft 8 in)
- Plays: Right-handed (two-handed backhand)
- Prize money: $220,802

Singles
- Career record: 0–1 (at ATP Tour level, Grand Slam level, and in Davis Cup)
- Career titles: 0
- Highest ranking: No. 197 (3 October 2022)

Grand Slam singles results
- Australian Open: Q1 (2023)
- French Open: Q3 (2021)
- Wimbledon: Q1 (2022)
- US Open: Q1 (2022)

Doubles
- Career record: 0–0 (at ATP Tour level, Grand Slam level, and in Davis Cup)
- Career titles: 0
- Highest ranking: No. 513 (27 May 2019)

Grand Slam mixed doubles results
- French Open: 1R (2018)
- Last updated on: 2 May 2025.

Evan Furness (born 13 August 1998) is a French inactive professional tennis player. He has a career high ATP singles ranking of world No. 197, achieved on 2 October 2022. He also has a career high doubles ranking of No. 513, achieved on 27 May 2019. Furness has won one ATP Challenger and eight ITF singles titles.

== Career ==
=== 2017: First win over Top 100 player ===
In October 2017 he secured his first win over a top 100 player when he beat Marcos Baghdatis at the Eckental Challenger.

Furness reached 5 semifinals on the Futures Tour in 2017; at Poitiers, Gdynia, Troyes, Riga and Nottingham.

=== 2018: First title on the Futures Tour ===
In March 2018 he won his first tournament on the Futures Tour. In Faro, he defeated David Guez in the final, winning in straight sets, In April 2018 he reached the semifinals of the Futures event in Porto but had to retire when one set apiece against Pedro Cachin with a calf injury.

He was awarded a wildcard to the French Open qualifying. He lost to Peđa Krstin. At the same tournament, Furness made his Grand Slam main draw debut, where he received a wildcard into the mixed doubles event, partnering Fiona Ferro.

=== 2022: First Challenger title, ATP Tour debut ===
In April 2022, he won his first Challenger tournament, as a qualifier, at the Ostra Group Open, defeating Ryan Peniston in the final.

In September 2022, Furness made his debut on the ATP Tour at the 2022 Moselle Open in Metz, France entering the main draw as a qualifier and losing in the first round to Alexander Bublik.

== Personal life ==
He was coached by his father Mark in Brittany before moving to the French Federation in Paris and he has a sister called Lucy. He plays guitar and knows how to open an oyster perfectly. He likes pigeons, Bob Dylan, girls with red hair and Larry le malicieux.

== ATP Challenger and ITF Futures/World Tennis Tour finals ==
=== Singles: 14 (9-5) ===
Legend (singles) ATP Challenger Tour (1–0) ITF Futures Tour (8-5)	Finals by surface Hard (7-4) Clay (1–1) Grass (0–0) Carpet(1-0)

Result	W–L	Date	Tournament	Tier	Surface	Opponent	Score
Loss	0-1	Oct 2016	France F22, Saint-Dizier	Futures	Hard	(France) Remi Boutillier	4-6, 1-6
Win	1-1	Mar 2018	Portugal F2, Faro	Futures	Hard	(France) David Guez	6-1, 6-1
Loss	1-2	Dec 2018	Cameroon F1, Yaounde	Futures	Hard	(Tunisia) Skander Mansouri	6-3, 3–6, 4-6
Win	2-2	Jan 2019	M25 Hong Kong	World Tennis Tour	Hard	(Germany) Julian Lenz	5-6 ret.
Win	3-2	Feb 2019	M25 Oberentfelden, Switzerland	World Tennis Tour	Carpet	(Switzerland) Sandro Ehrat	4-6, 7–5, 6-4
Loss	3-3	Jan 2020	M15 Manacor, Spain	World Tennis Tour	Hard	(Spain) Carlos Alcaraz	0-6, 2-6
Loss	3-4	Jan 2020	M15 Manacor, Spain	World Tennis Tour	Clay	(Spain) Carlos Alcaraz	3-6, 4-6
Win	4-4	Nov 2020	M15 Heraklion, Greece	World Tennis Tour	Hard	(Croatia) Matija Pecotić	6-3, 1–6, 6-3
Win	5-4	Nov 2020	M15 Heraklion, Greece	World Tennis Tour	Hard	(Monaco) Lucas Catarina	6-1, 2–6, 7-5
Win	6-4	Nov 2020	M15 Heraklion, Greece	World Tennis Tour	Hard	(Monaco) Lucas Catarina	6-3, 4–6, 6-1
Loss	6-5	Jan 2021	M15 Manacor, Spain	World Tennis Tour	Hard	(Switzerland) Antoine Bellier	6-7^{(7-9)}, 4-6
Win	7-5	Jan 2021	M15 Manacor, Spain	World Tennis Tour	Hard	(Denmark) Holger Rune	6-2, 5–7, 6-0
Win	8-5	Feb 2021	M25 Vale Do Lobo, Portugal	World Tennis Tour	Hard	(Portugal) Gastao Elias	6-2, 6-4
Win	9-5	Apr 2022	Ostrava, Czech Republic	Challenger	Clay	(United Kingdom) Ryan Peniston	4-6, 7–6^{(8–6)}, 6-1

=== Doubles: 3 (1-2) ===
Legend (doubles) ATP Challenger Tour (0–0) ITF Futures Tour (1-2)	Titles by surface Hard (1-1) Clay (0–1) Grass (0–0) Carpet(0-0)

Result	W–L	Date	Tournament	Tier	Surface	Partner	Opponents	Score
Loss	0-1	Aug 2016	Belgium F8, Ostend	Futures	Clay	(France) Ugo Humbert	(Netherlands) Botic Van de Zandschulp (Netherlands) Paul Monteban	6-3, 5–7, [5-10]
Loss	0-2	Oct 2016	France F22, Saint-Dizier	Futures	Hard	(France) Geoffrey Blancaneaux	(France) Hugo Nys (France) Mick Lescure	2-6, 3-6
Win	1-2	Nov 2020	M15 Heraklion, Greece	World Tennis Tour	Hard	(France) Clement Tabur	(Germany) Lucas Gerch (Mexico) Gerardo Lopez Villasenor	7-6^{(7-4)}, 7-6^{(7-4)}
