= Jan Jermář =

Czech tennis player (born 2000)

- Country (sports): Czech Republic
- Born: 12 April 2000 (age 25) Nový Jičín, Czech Republic
- Height: 1.91 m (6 ft 3 in)
- Plays: Right-handed (two-handed backhand)
- Prize money: $34,119

Singles
- Career record: 0–0 (at ATP Tour level, Grand Slam level, and in Davis Cup)
- Career titles: 0
- Highest ranking: No. 1,489 (16 September 2024)
- Current ranking: No. 2,138 (17 November 2025)

Doubles
- Career record: 0–0 (at ATP Tour level, Grand Slam level, and in Davis Cup)
- Career titles: 1 Challenger, 8 ITF
- Highest ranking: No. 216 (28 July 2025)
- Current ranking: No. 229 (17 November 2025)
Medal record
Representing Czech Republic
World University Games
Bronze medal – third place	2025 Rhine-Ruhr	Mixed doubles
- Last updated on: 17 November 2025.

Jan Jermář (born 12 April 2000) is a Czech tennis player.

Jermář has a career high ATP singles ranking of No. 1,489 achieved on 16 September 2024 and a career high ATP doubles ranking of No. 216 achieved on 28 July 2025.

Jermář has won one ATP Challenger doubles title at the 2025 Ostra Group Open.
