= Marek Michalička =

Czech tennis player

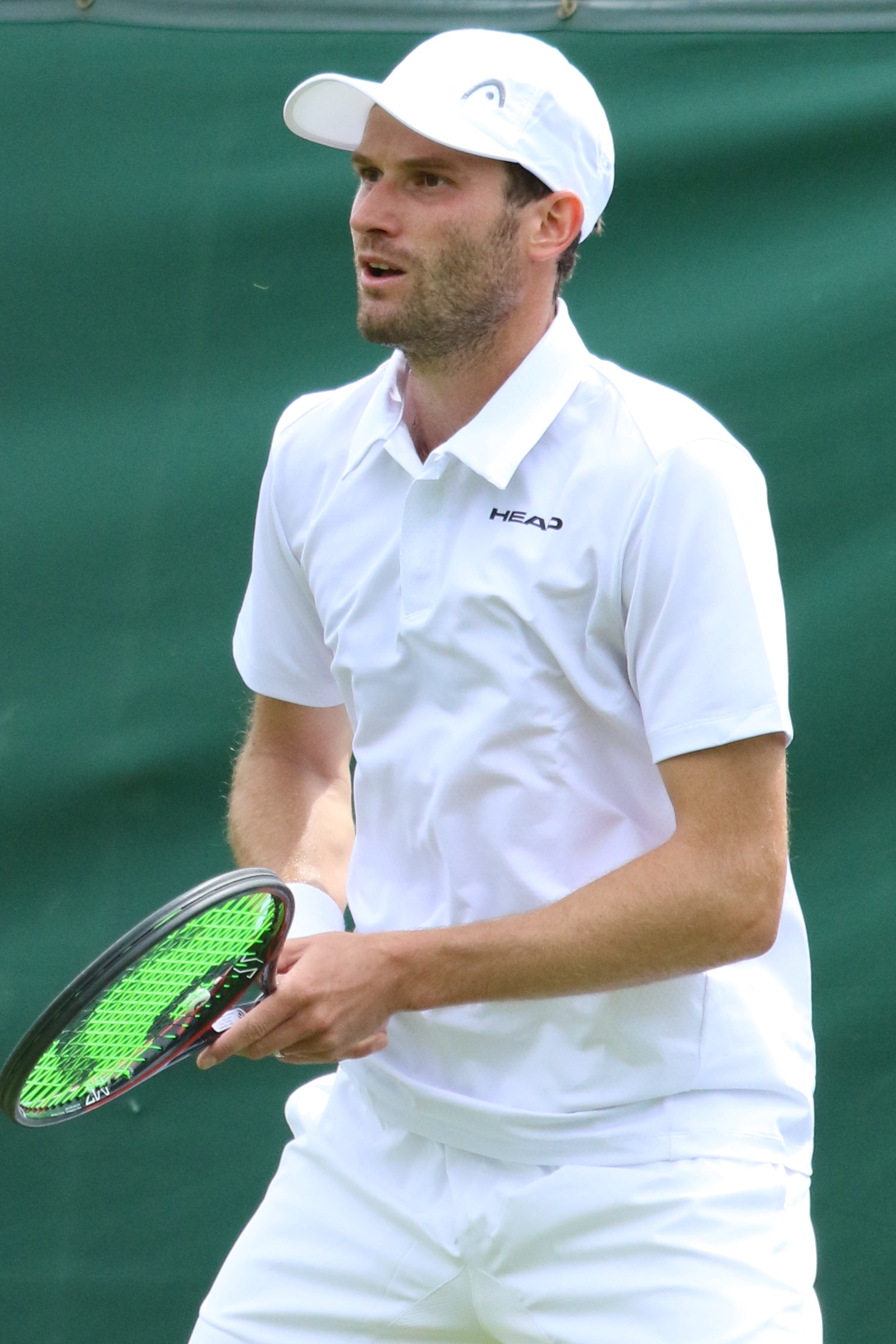
- Country (sports): Czech Republic
- Residence: Říčany, Czech Republic
- Born: 23 December 1986 (age 39) Prague, Czechoslovakia
- Height: 1.82 m (5 ft 11 1/2 in)
- Plays: Right-handed (two-handed backhand)
- Prize money: $143,900

Singles
- Career record: 0–0
- Career titles: 0
- Highest ranking: No. 235 (6 June 2016)

Grand Slam singles results
- Wimbledon: Q1 (2016)
- US Open: Q1 (2012)

Doubles
- Career record: 0–1
- Career titles: 0
- Highest ranking: No. 261 (23 June 2014)

Marek Michalička (born 23 December 1986) is a professional Czech tennis player.

On 6 June 2015 Michalička reached his career-high singles ranking of No. 235 and reached a career-high doubles ranking of No. 261 on 23 June 2014.

Michalička has won 10 singles and 11 doubles titles at ITF Futures Tour.

== Career ==
He made his grand slam qualification debut at the 2012 US Open, losing to Roberto Bautista-Agut 3–6, 4–6.

He made his ATP World Tour debut at 2016 BNP Paribas Open in doubles competition partnering with Ivo Minář losing in the first round to Nenad Zimonjić and Edouard Roger-Vasselin 3–6, 7–6^{(8–6)}, [15–17] after failing to convert 4 match points.

Currently, he runs the Process Tennis Academy in Bloomfield Hills, Michigan.
