= Prosperita Open =

Ostra Group Open
- 2025 Ostra Group Open

ATP Challenger Tour
- Event name: Ostra Group Open (2021-), Prosperita Open
- Location: Ostrava, Czech Republic
- Venue: SC Ostrava
- Category: ATP Challenger Tour
- Surface: Clay
- Draw: 32S/30Q/16D
- Prize money: €91,250 (2025), 42,500+H
- Website: Website

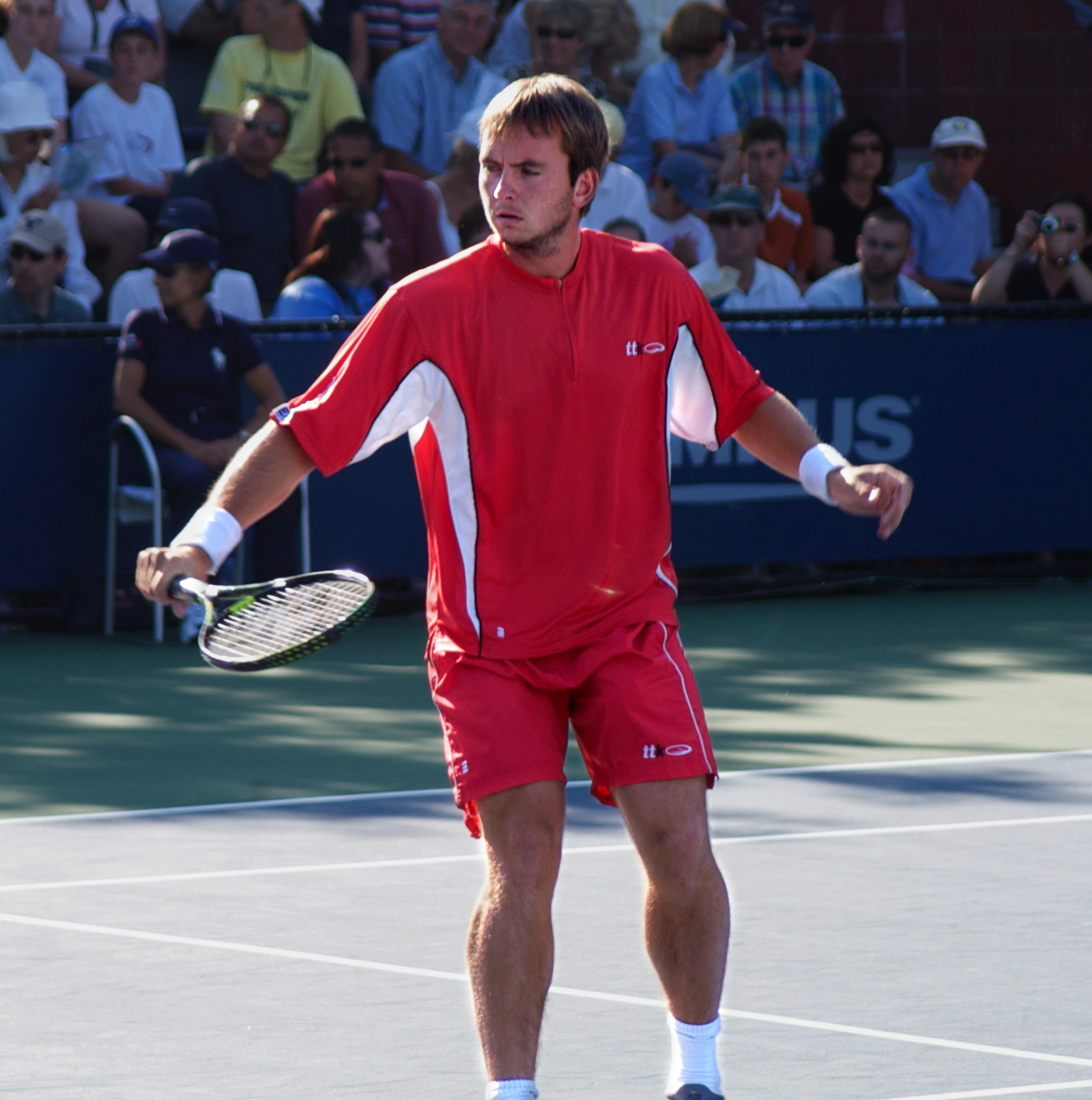
2006 champion Ivo Minář is one of five Czech players to have won the singles in the event's six editions

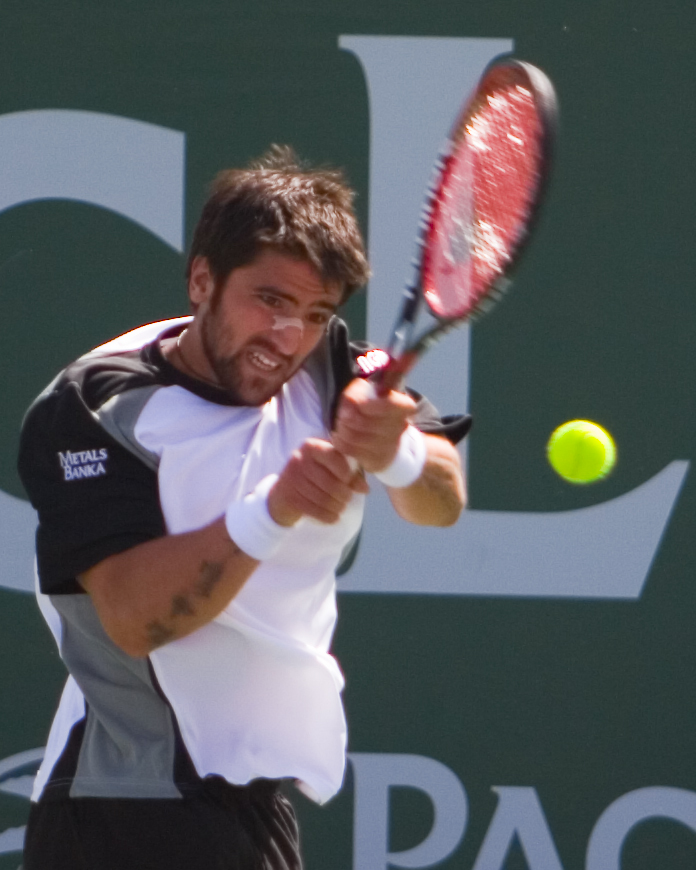
Competing for Serbia and Montenegro, Janko Tipsarević won the inaugural Ostrava singles title in 2004

The Ostra Group Open, formerly known as Prosperita Open, is a professional tennis tournament played on outdoor red clay courts. It is currently part of the Association of Tennis Professionals (ATP) Challenger Tour. It has been held annually in Ostrava, Czech Republic, since 2004.

Pavel Šnobel and Sergiy Stakhovsky have won two doubles titles each. Stakhovsky won his second doubles title 13 years after his first win.

Jan Hájek, Stéphane Robert, and Andrey Kuznetsov won both singles and doubles title the same year.

== Past finals ==
=== Singles ===
| Year | Champion | Runner-up | Score |
|---|---|---|---|
| 2026 | (Spain) Nikolás Sánchez Izquierdo | (Czech Republic) Zdeněk Kolář | 6–4, 7–6^{(7–4)} |
| 2025 | (Hungary) Zsombor Piros | (Lebanon) Hady Habib | 6–3, 6–2 |
| 2024 | (Bosnia and Herzegovina) Damir Džumhur | (Germany) Henri Squire | 6–2, 4–6, 7–5 |
| 2023 | (Czech Republic) Zdeněk Kolář | (Hungary) Máté Valkusz | 6–3, 6–2 |
| 2022 | (France) Evan Furness | (United Kingdom) Ryan Peniston | 4–6, 7–6^{(8–6)}, 6–1 |
| 2021 | (France) Benjamin Bonzi | (Argentina) Renzo Olivo | 6–4, 6–4 |
| 2020 | (Russia) Aslan Karatsev | (Germany) Oscar Otte | 6–4, 6–2 |
| 2019 | (Poland) Kamil Majchrzak | (Italy) Jannik Sinner | 6–1, 6–0 |
| 2018 | (Belgium) Arthur De Greef | (Croatia) Nino Serdarušić | 4–6, 6–4, 6–2 |
| 2017 | (Italy) Stefano Travaglia | (Italy) Marco Cecchinato | 6–2, 3–6, 6–4 |
| 2016 | (France) Constant Lestienne | (Czech Republic) Zdeněk Kolář | 6–7^{(5–7)}, 6–1, 6–2 |
| 2015 | (Spain) Íñigo Cervantes | (Czech Republic) Adam Pavlásek | 7–6^{(7–5)}, 6–4 |
| 2014 | (Russia) Andrey Kuznetsov | (Slovakia) Miloslav Mečíř Jr. | 2–6, 6–3, 6–0 |
| 2013 | (Czech Republic) Jiří Veselý | (Belgium) Steve Darcis | 6–4, 6–4 |
| 2012 | (France) Jonathan Dasnières de Veigy | (Czech Republic) Jan Hájek | 7–5, 6–2 |
| 2011 | (France) Stéphane Robert | (Hungary) Ádám Kellner | 6–1, 6–3 |
| 2010 | (Czech Republic) Lukáš Rosol | (Croatia) Ivan Dodig | 7–5, 4–6, 7–6^{(7–4)} |
| 2009 | (Czech Republic) Jan Hájek | (Croatia) Ivan Dodig | 7–5, 6–1 |
| 2008 | (Czech Republic) Jiří Vaněk | (Czech Republic) Jan Hernych | 6–3, 4–6, 6–1 |
| 2007 | (Czech Republic) Bohdan Ulihrach | (Czech Republic) Lukáš Dlouhý | 6–4, 6–4 |
| 2006 | (Czech Republic) Ivo Minář | (Spain) Marcel Granollers | 6–1, 6–0 |
| 2005 | (Czech Republic) Lukáš Dlouhý | (France) Nicolas Devilder | 6–4, 7–6^{(7–4)} |
| 2004 | (Serbia and Montenegro) Janko Tipsarević | (Australia) Peter Luczak | 6–3, 7–6^{(7–5)} |

=== Doubles ===
| Year | Champions | Runners-up | Score |
|---|---|---|---|
| 2026 | (Spain) Sergio Martos Gornés (Poland) Szymon Walków | (Poland) Karol Drzewiecki (Poland) Piotr Matuszewski | 6–7^{(3–7)}, 7–5, [10–8] |
| 2025 | (Czech Republic) Jan Jermář (Serbia) Stefan Latinović | (New Zealand) Finn Reynolds (New Zealand) James Watt | 7–5, 6–3 |
| 2024 | (Portugal) Jaime Faria (Portugal) Henrique Rocha | (Germany) Jakob Schnaitter (Germany) Mark Wallner | 7–5, 6–3 |
| 2023 | (United States) Robert Galloway (Mexico) Miguel Ángel Reyes-Varela | (Argentina) Guido Andreozzi (Argentina) Guillermo Durán | 7–5, 7–6^{(7–5)} |
| 2022 | (Austria) Alexander Erler (Austria) Lucas Miedler | (United States) Hunter Reese (Netherlands) Sem Verbeek | 7–6^{(7–5)}, 7–5 |
| 2021 | (Australia) Marc Polmans (Ukraine) Sergiy Stakhovsky (2) | (Czech Republic) Andrew Paulson (Czech Republic) Patrik Rikl | 7–6^{(7–4)}, 3–6, [10–7] |
| 2020 | (New Zealand) Artem Sitak (Slovakia) Igor Zelenay | (Poland) Karol Drzewiecki (Poland) Szymon Walków | 7–5, 6–4 |
| 2019 | (Switzerland) Luca Margaroli (Slovakia) Filip Polášek | (Netherlands) Thiemo de Bakker (Netherlands) Tallon Griekspoor | 6–4, 2–6, [10–8] |
| 2018 | (Hungary) Attila Balázs (Portugal) Gonçalo Oliveira | (Czech Republic) Lukáš Rosol (Ukraine) Sergiy Stakhovsky | 6–0, 7–5 |
| 2017 | (India) Jeevan Nedunchezhiyan (Croatia) Franko Škugor | (Australia) Rameez Junaid (Czech Republic) Lukáš Rosol | 6–3, 6–2 |
| 2016 | (Netherlands) Sander Arends (Austria) Tristan-Samuel Weissborn | (Czech Republic) Lukáš Dlouhý (Chile) Hans Podlipnik | 7–6^{(10–8)}, 6–7^{(4–7)}, [10–5] |
| 2015 | (Slovakia) Andrej Martin (Chile) Hans Podlipnik-Castillo | (Czech Republic) Roman Jebavý (Czech Republic) Jan Šátral | 4–6, 7–5, [10–1] |
| 2014 | (Russia) Andrey Kuznetsov (Spain) Adrián Menéndez Maceiras | (Italy) Alessandro Motti (Italy) Matteo Viola | 4–6, 6–3, [10–8] |
| 2013 | (Belgium) Steve Darcis (Belgium) Olivier Rochus | (Poland) Tomasz Bednarek (Poland) Mateusz Kowalczyk | 7–5, 7–5 |
| 2012 | (Moldova) Radu Albot (Russia) Teymuraz Gabashvili | (Czech Republic) Adam Pavlásek (Czech Republic) Jiří Veselý | 7–5, 5–7, [10–8] |
| 2011 | (France) Olivier Charroin (France) Stéphane Robert | (Latvia) Andis Juška (Russia) Alexander Kudryavtsev | 6–4, 6–3 |
| 2010 | (Austria) Martin Fischer (Austria) Philipp Oswald | (Poland) Tomasz Bednarek (Poland) Mateusz Kowalczyk | 2–6, 7–6^{(8–6)}, [10–8] |
| 2009 | (Czech Republic) Jan Hájek (Czech Republic) Robin Vik | (Slovakia) Matúš Horecný (Slovakia) Tomáš Janci | 6–2, 6–4 |
| 2008 | (Ukraine) Sergiy Stakhovsky (1) (Czech Republic) Tomáš Zíb | (Czech Republic) Jan Hernych (Slovakia) Igor Zelenay | 7–6^{(8–6)}, 3–6, 14–12 |
| 2007 | (Germany) Bastian Knittel (Czech Republic) Lukáš Rosol | (Russia) Alexandre Krasnoroutskiy (Russia) Alexander Kudryavtsev | 2–6, 7–5, 11–9 |
| 2006 | (Czech Republic) Jaroslav Pospíšil (Czech Republic) Pavel Šnobel (2) | (Germany) Philipp Marx (Germany) Torsten Popp | 6–4, 6–7^{(3–7)}, 10–6 |
| 2005 | (Czech Republic) Pavel Šnobel (1) (Czech Republic) Martin Štěpánek | (Czech Republic) Tomáš Cibulec (Poland) Mariusz Fyrstenberg | 7–6^{(7–1)}, 2–6, 7–6^{(7–4)} |
| 2004 | (Finland) Tuomas Ketola (Czech Republic) Petr Pála | (Poland) Łukasz Kubot (Czech Republic) Tomáš Zíb | 6–4, 6–4 |
