= 2015 Istanbul Open – Doubles =

Tennis tournament

Doubles
- 2015 Istanbul Open

Final
- Champions: (Moldova) Radu Albot (Serbia) Dušan Lajović
- Runners-up: (Sweden) Robert Lindstedt (Austria) Jürgen Melzer
- Score: 6–4, 7–6^{(7–2)}

Events
Singles	Doubles
Istanbul Open	· 2016 →

This is the first edition of the tournament.
Radu Albot and Dušan Lajović won the title, defeating Robert Lindstedt and Jürgen Melzer in the final, 6–4, 7–6^{(7–2)}.

== Seeds ==
1. (Sweden) Robert Lindstedt / (Austria) Jürgen Melzer (final)
2. (Austria) Oliver Marach / (Austria) Philipp Oswald (quarterfinals)
3. (Australia) Chris Guccione / (Brazil) Andre Sá (semifinals)
4. (Croatia) Mate Pavić / (New Zealand) Michael Venus (quarterfinals)

== Draw ==
=== Key ===
- Q = Qualifier
- WC = Wild card
- LL = Lucky loser
- Alt = Alternate
- SE = Special exempt
- PR = Protected ranking
- ITF = ITF entry
- JE = Junior exempt
- w/o = Walkover
- r = Retired
- d = Defaulted
- SR = Special ranking

=== Draw ===
First round
1	(Sweden) R Lindstedt (Austria) J Melzer	6	6
Alt	(Russia) F Chervyakov (Zimbabwe) M Fynn	2	2
(France) F Martin (India) P Raja	2	3
(Belarus) A Bury (Russia) T Gabashvili	6	6
4	(Croatia) M Pavić (New Zealand) M Venus	6	6
(Belarus) S Betov (Russia) A Kuznetsov	3	4
(Slovenia) B Kavčič (Argentina) D Schwartzman	7	2	[3]
(New Zealand) M Daniell (Colombia) S Giraldo	5	6	[10]
(Kazakhstan) A Golubev (Uzbekistan) D Istomin	6	6
(Kazakhstan) M Kukushkin (Kazakhstan) A Nedovyesov	3	4
WC	(Turkey) T Altuna (Georgia (country)) N Basilashvili	3	2
3	(Australia) C Guccione (Brazil) A Sá	6	6
(Moldova) R Albot (Serbia) D Lajović	6	6
WC	(Turkey) M İlhan (Turkey) C İlkel	3	3
(Sweden) J Brunström (Israel) J Erlich	5	5
2	(Austria) O Marach (Austria) P Oswald	7	7

Quarterfinals
1	(Sweden) R Lindstedt (Austria) J Melzer	6	7
(Belarus) A Bury (Russia) T Gabashvili	1	5
4	(Croatia) M Pavić (New Zealand) M Venus	2	4
(New Zealand) M Daniell (Colombia) S Giraldo	6	6
(Kazakhstan) A Golubev (Uzbekistan) D Istomin	3	3
3	(Australia) C Guccione (Brazil) A Sá	6	6
(Moldova) R Albot (Serbia) D Lajović	6^{9}	6	[10]
2	(Austria) O Marach (Austria) P Oswald	7^{11}	2	[8]

Semifinals
1	(Sweden) R Lindstedt (Austria) J Melzer	6	6
(New Zealand) M Daniell (Colombia) S Giraldo	2	1
3	(Australia) C Guccione (Brazil) A Sá	4	6^{5}
(Moldova) R Albot (Serbia) D Lajović	6	7^{7}

Final
1	(Sweden) R Lindstedt (Austria) J Melzer	4	6^{2}
(Moldova) R Albot (Serbia) D Lajović	6	7^{7}
