= 2016 Istanbul Open – Singles =

Singles
- 2016 Istanbul Open

Final
- Champion: (Argentina) Diego Schwartzman
- Runner-up: (Bulgaria) Grigor Dimitrov
- Score: 6–7^{(5–7)}, 7–6^{(7–4)}, 6–0

Details
- Draw: 28
- Seeds: 8

Events
Singles	Doubles
← 2015 ·	Istanbul Open	· 2017 →

Roger Federer was the defending champion, but chose not to participate this year.

Diego Schwartzman won the title, defeating Grigor Dimitrov in the final, 6–7^{(5–7)}, 7–6^{(7–4)}, 6–0.

== Seeds ==
The top four seeds receive a bye into the second round.

1. (Australia) Bernard Tomic (second round)
2. (Bulgaria) Grigor Dimitrov (final)
3. (Croatia) Ivo Karlović (semifinals)
4. (Argentina) Federico Delbonis (semifinals)
5. (Spain) Marcel Granollers (quarterfinals)
6. (Czech Republic) Jiří Veselý (quarterfinals)
7. (Russia) Teymuraz Gabashvili (first round)
8. (Spain) Albert Ramos Viñolas (quarterfinals)

== Draw ==
=== Key ===
- Q = Qualifier
- WC = Wild card
- LL = Lucky loser
- Alt = Alternate
- SE = Special exempt
- PR = Protected ranking
- ITF = ITF entry
- JE = Junior exempt
- w/o = Walkover
- r = Retired
- d = Defaulted
- SR = Special ranking

=== Finals ===
Semifinals
(Argentina) Diego Schwartzman	6^{5}	6	6
4	(Argentina) Federico Delbonis	7^{7}	3	2
3	(Croatia) Ivo Karlović	6^{0}	6^{2}
2	(Bulgaria) Grigor Dimitrov	7^{7}	7^{7}

Final
(Argentina) Diego Schwartzman	6^{5}	7^{7}	6
2	(Bulgaria) Grigor Dimitrov	7^{7}	6^{4}	0

=== Top half ===
First round
(Argentina) F Bagnis	1	4
(Argentina) D Schwartzman	6	6
(Ukraine) I Marchenko	6	3	6
LL	(Argentina) M González	3	6	1
(Bosnia and Herzegovina) D Džumhur	6	6
7	(Russia) T Gabashvili	4	2
(Israel) D Sela	6	6
Q	(Russia) A Rublev	3	2
WC	(Russia) K Khachanov	6	6^{4}	6
(United Kingdom) A Bedene	4	7^{7}	4
(France) A Mannarino	5	1
8	(Spain) A Ramos Viñolas	7	6

Second round
1	(Australia) B Tomic	2	2
(Argentina) D Schwartzman	6	6
(Ukraine) I Marchenko	3	7	3
(Bosnia and Herzegovina) D Džumhur	6	5	6
4	(Argentina) F Delbonis	6	2	6
(Israel) D Sela	3	6	4
WC	(Russia) K Khachanov	6	1	0
8	(Spain) A Ramos Viñolas	4	6	6

Quarterfinals
(Argentina) D Schwartzman	5	7^{7}	6
(Bosnia and Herzegovina) D Džumhur	7	6^{4}	2
4	(Argentina) F Delbonis	7^{8}	6
8	(Spain) A Ramos Viñolas	6^{6}	4

Semifinals
(Argentina) D Schwartzman	6^{5}	6	6
4	(Argentina) F Delbonis	7^{7}	3	2

=== Bottom half ===
First round
5	(Spain) M Granollers	6	7^{11}
WC	(Turkey) C İlkel	1	6^{9}
Q	(Argentina) C Berlocq	2	3
(South Korea) H Chung	6	6
Q	(Argentina) R Olivo	5	4
(Serbia) D Lajović	7	6
6	(Czech Republic) J Veselý	6	7
(Netherlands) T de Bakker	3	5
(Spain) R Carballés Baena	6	6
WC	(Turkey) M İlhan	2	4
Q	(Romania) A Ungur	6	6
(Serbia) F Krajinović	3	3

Second round
5	(Spain) M Granollers	6	6
(South Korea) H Chung	3	4
(Serbia) D Lajović	6^{11}	6^{7}
3	(Croatia) I Karlović	7^{13}	7^{9}
6	(Czech Republic) J Veselý	6^{5}	6	6
(Spain) R Carballés Baena	7^{7}	2	2
Q	(Romania) A Ungur	5	6	5
2	(Bulgaria) G Dimitrov	7	4	7

Quarterfinals
5	(Spain) M Granollers	6^{2}	7^{7}	4
3	(Croatia) I Karlović	7^{7}	6^{5}	6
6	(Czech Republic) J Veselý	6^{1}	1
2	(Bulgaria) G Dimitrov	7^{7}	6

Semifinals
3	(Croatia) I Karlović	6^{0}	6^{2}
2	(Bulgaria) G Dimitrov	7^{7}	7^{7}

== Qualifying ==
=== Seeds ===
1. (Argentina) Máximo González (qualifying competition, lucky loser)
2. (Argentina) Carlos Berlocq (qualified)
3. (Russia) Andrey Rublev (qualified)
4. (Moldova) Radu Albot (first round)
5. (Argentina) Renzo Olivo (qualified)
6. (Italy) Alessandro Giannessi (qualifying competition)
7. (Romania) Marius Copil (qualifying competition)
8. (Romania) Adrian Ungur (qualified)

=== Qualifiers ===
1. (Romania) Adrian Ungur
2. (Argentina) Carlos Berlocq
3. (Russia) Andrey Rublev
4. (Argentina) Renzo Olivo

=== Lucky loser ===
1. (Argentina) Máximo González

=== Qualifying draw ===
==== First qualifier ====
First round
1	(Argentina) Máximo González	6^{3}	6	6
Alt	(Bosnia and Herzegovina) Tomislav Brkić	7^{7}	3	4
(Japan) Hiroki Moriya	1	6	2
8	(Romania) Adrian Ungur	6	1	6

Qualifying competition
1	(Argentina) Máximo González	3	5
8	(Romania) Adrian Ungur	6	7

==== Second qualifier ====
First round
2	(Argentina) Carlos Berlocq	6	6^{5}	7
WC	(Bulgaria) Dimitar Kuzmanov	4	7^{7}	5
(Austria) Michael Linzer	0^{r}
6	(Italy) Alessandro Giannessi	1

Qualifying competition
2	(Argentina) Carlos Berlocq	7^{7}	6
6	(Italy) Alessandro Giannessi	6^{3}	3

==== Third qualifier ====
First round
3	(Russia) Andrey Rublev	6	6
WC	(Turkey) Sarp Ağabigün	3	3
(Italy) Flavio Cipolla	2	4
7	(Romania) Marius Copil	6	6

Qualifying competition
3	(Russia) Andrey Rublev	4	6	6
7	(Romania) Marius Copil	6	0	3

==== Fourth qualifier ====
First round
4	(Moldova) Radu Albot	6^{5}	2
(Russia) Ivan Nedelko	7^{7}	6
(Czech Republic) Michal Konečný	4	6^{4}
5	(Argentina) Renzo Olivo	6	7^{7}

Qualifying competition
(Russia) Ivan Nedelko	4	3
5	(Argentina) Renzo Olivo	6	6
