= 2016 Istanbul Open – Doubles =

Doubles
- 2016 Istanbul Open

Final
- Champions: (Italy) Flavio Cipolla (Israel) Dudi Sela
- Runners-up: (Argentina) Andrés Molteni (Argentina) Diego Schwartzman
- Score: 6–3, 5–7, [10–7]

Events
Singles	Doubles
← 2015 ·	Istanbul Open	· 2017 →

Radu Albot and Dušan Lajović were the defending champions, but Lajović chose not to participate this year. Albot played alongside Illya Marchenko, but lost in the first round to Dominic Inglot and Robert Lindstedt.
Flavio Cipolla and Dudi Sela won the title, defeating Andrés Molteni and Diego Schwartzman in the final, 6–3, 5–7, [10–7].

== Seeds ==
1. (United Kingdom) Dominic Inglot / (Sweden) Robert Lindstedt (quarterfinals, withdrew)
2. (United States) Nicholas Monroe / (Croatia) Mate Pavić (first round)
3. (Argentina) Guillermo Durán / (Argentina) Máximo González (semifinals)
4. (Netherlands) Wesley Koolhof / (Netherlands) Matwé Middelkoop (first round)

== Draw ==
=== Key ===
- Q = Qualifier
- WC = Wild card
- LL = Lucky loser
- Alt = Alternate
- SE = Special exempt
- PR = Protected ranking
- ITF = ITF entry
- JE = Junior exempt
- w/o = Walkover
- r = Retired
- d = Defaulted
- SR = Special ranking

=== Draw ===
First round
1	(United Kingdom) D Inglot (Sweden) R Lindstedt	7^{10}	6
(Moldova) R Albot (Ukraine) I Marchenko	6^{8}	3
(Italy) F Cipolla (Israel) D Sela	6	6
(Australia) C Guccione (Brazil) A Sá	2	4
3	(Argentina) G Durán (Argentina) M González	7	6
(United Kingdom) J Marray (Canada) A Shamasdin	5	4
PR	(Czech Republic) R Jebavý (Czech Republic) J Veselý	w/o
(France) A Mannarino (France) L Pouille
(New Zealand) M Daniell (New Zealand) A Sitak	6	6
WC	(Turkey) T Altuna (Croatia) D Marcan	1	4
(Argentina) C Berlocq (Russia) T Gabashvili	7^{8}	6^{4}	[10]
4	(Netherlands) W Koolhof (Netherlands) M Middelkoop	6^{6}	7^{7}	[4]
(United Kingdom) A Bedene (Croatia) A Šančić	6	6
WC	(Turkey) C İlkel (Australia) B Tomic	4	2
(Argentina) A Molteni (Argentina) D Schwartzman	6	6
2	(United States) N Monroe (Croatia) M Pavić	3	4

Quarterfinals
1	(United Kingdom) D Inglot (Sweden) R Lindstedt
(Italy) F Cipolla (Israel) D Sela	w/o
3	(Argentina) G Durán (Argentina) M González	2	6	[10]
PR	(Czech Republic) R Jebavý (Czech Republic) J Veselý	6	2	[8]
(New Zealand) M Daniell (New Zealand) A Sitak	6	6
(Argentina) C Berlocq (Russia) T Gabashvili	4	3
(United Kingdom) A Bedene (Croatia) A Šančić	5	1
(Argentina) A Molteni (Argentina) D Schwartzman	7	6

Semifinals
(Italy) F Cipolla (Israel) D Sela	7^{7}	6
3	(Argentina) G Durán (Argentina) M González	6^{5}	1
(New Zealand) M Daniell (New Zealand) A Sitak	4	6	[6]
(Argentina) A Molteni (Argentina) D Schwartzman	6	1	[10]

Final
(Italy) F Cipolla (Israel) D Sela	6	5	[10]
(Argentina) A Molteni (Argentina) D Schwartzman	3	7	[7]
