= 2017 Istanbul Open – Singles =

Men's tennis tournament

Singles
- 2017 Istanbul Open

Final
- Champion: (Croatia) Marin Čilić
- Runner-up: (Canada) Milos Raonic
- Score: 7–6^{(7–3)}, 6–3

Details
- Draw: 28 (4 Q / 3 WC )
- Seeds: 8

Events
Singles	Doubles
← 2016 ·	Istanbul Open	· 2018 →

Diego Schwartzman was the defending champion, but lost in the semifinals to Marin Čilić.

Čilić went on to win the title, defeating Milos Raonic in the final, 7–6^{(7–3)}, 6–3.

== Seeds ==
The top four seeds receive a bye into the second round.

1. (Canada) Milos Raonic (final)
2. (Croatia) Marin Čilić (champion)
3. (Argentina) Diego Schwartzman (semifinals)
4. (Italy) Paolo Lorenzi (second round)
5. (Serbia) Viktor Troicki (semifinals)
6. (Australia) Bernard Tomic (quarterfinals)
7. (Croatia) Borna Ćorić (first round)
8. (Belgium) Steve Darcis (quarterfinals)

== Draw ==
=== Key ===
- Q = Qualifier
- WC = Wild card
- LL = Lucky loser
- Alt = Alternate
- SE = Special exempt
- PR = Protected ranking
- ITF = ITF entry
- JE = Junior exempt
- w/o = Walkover
- r = Retired
- d = Defaulted
- SR = Special ranking

=== Finals ===
Semifinals
1	(Canada) Milos Raonic	6	6
5	(Serbia) Viktor Troicki	2	3
3	(Argentina) Diego Schwartzman	1	6^{7}
2/WC	(Croatia) Marin Čilić	6	7^{9}

Final
1	(Canada) Milos Raonic	6^{3}	3
2/WC	(Croatia) Marin Čilić	7^{7}	6

=== Top half ===
First round
WC	(Hungary) M Fucsovics	6^{3}	6	4
(United Kingdom) A Bedene	7^{7}	4	6
(Brazil) R Dutra Silva	3	7^{7}	6
Q	(Italy) R Bellotti	6	6^{1}	0
LL	(Egypt) M Safwat	7	5	3
6	(Australia) B Tomic	5	7	6
Q	(Germany) D Brands	3	4
SE	(Serbia) L Đere	6	6
(Georgia (country)) N Basilashvili	3	7^{7}	1
(Russia) K Khachanov	6	6^{2}	6
(Cyprus) M Baghdatis	5	4
5	(Serbia) V Troicki	7	6

Second round
1	(Canada) M Raonic	6^{5}	6	7^{7}
(United Kingdom) A Bedene	7^{7}	3	6^{3}
(Brazil) R Dutra Silva	5	3
6	(Australia) B Tomic	7	6
4	(Italy) P Lorenzi	4	3
SE	(Serbia) L Đere	6	6
(Russia) K Khachanov	4	6^{5}
5	(Serbia) V Troicki	6	7^{7}

Quarterfinals
1	(Canada) M Raonic	7^{7}	7^{8}
6	(Australia) B Tomic	6^{4}	6^{6}
SE	(Serbia) L Đere	2	3^{r}
5	(Serbia) V Troicki	6	2

Semifinals
1	(Canada) M Raonic	6	6
5	(Serbia) V Troicki	2	3

=== Bottom half ===
First round
7	(Croatia) B Ćorić	3	7^{7}	5
(Serbia) D Lajović	6	6^{1}	7
(Russia) M Youzhny	3	6	6
WC	(Turkey) C İlkel	6	3	3
Q	(Spain) A Menéndez Maceiras	7^{7}	0	0
(Australia) J Thompson	6^{4}	6	6
8	(Belgium) S Darcis	7	6
(Israel) D Sela	5	4
(Czech Republic) J Veselý	7	2	6
(Spain) M Granollers	5	6	4
Q	(Greece) S Tsitsipas	4	5
(Bosnia and Herzegovina) D Džumhur	6	7

Second round
(Serbia) D Lajović	3	6	6
(Russia) M Youzhny	6	0	3
(Australia) J Thompson	1	3
3	(Argentina) D Schwartzman	6	6
8	(Belgium) S Darcis	6	6
(Czech Republic) J Veselý	2	1
(Bosnia and Herzegovina) D Džumhur	3	2
2/WC	(Croatia) M Čilić	6	6

Quarterfinals
(Serbia) D Lajović	5	2
3	(Argentina) D Schwartzman	7	6
8	(Belgium) S Darcis	1	1
2/WC	(Croatia) M Čilić	6	6

Semifinals
3	(Argentina) D Schwartzman	1	6^{7}
2/WC	(Croatia) M Čilić	6	7^{9}

== Qualifying ==
=== Seeds ===
1. (Germany) Tobias Kamke (first round)
2. (Bosnia and Herzegovina) Mirza Bašić (first round)
3. (Spain) Adrián Menéndez Maceiras (qualified)
4. (Canada) Steven Diez (first round)
5. (Egypt) Mohamed Safwat (qualifying competition, lucky loser)
6. (Italy) Riccardo Bellotti (qualified)
7. (Greece) Stefanos Tsitsipas (qualified)
8. (Germany) Daniel Brands (qualified)

=== Qualifiers ===
1. (Italy) Riccardo Bellotti
2. (Germany) Daniel Brands
3. (Spain) Adrián Menéndez Maceiras
4. (Greece) Stefanos Tsitsipas

=== Lucky loser ===
1. (Egypt) Mohamed Safwat

=== Qualifying draw ===
==== First qualifier ====
First round
1	(Germany) Tobias Kamke	7	5	1
(Lithuania) Laurynas Grigelis	5	7	6
Alt	(Argentina) Andrés Molteni	3	1
6	(Italy) Riccardo Bellotti	6	6

Qualifying competition
(Lithuania) Laurynas Grigelis	2	1
6	(Italy) Riccardo Bellotti	6	6

==== Second qualifier ====
First round
2	(Bosnia and Herzegovina) Mirza Bašić	2	1
WC	(Serbia) Miomir Kecmanović	6	6
(Spain) Pere Riba	7^{12}	6^{5}	4
8	(Germany) Daniel Brands	6^{10}	7^{7}	6

Qualifying competition
WC	(Serbia) Miomir Kecmanović	4	4
8	(Germany) Daniel Brands	6	6

==== Third qualifier ====
First round
3	(Spain) Adrián Menéndez Maceiras	7	6
(Germany) Marc Sieber	5	4
WC	(Turkey) Altuğ Çelikbilek	4	2
5	(Egypt) Mohamed Safwat	6	6

Qualifying competition
3	(Spain) Adrián Menéndez Maceiras	6	6
5	(Egypt) Mohamed Safwat	1	2

==== Fourth qualifier ====
First round
4	(Canada) Steven Diez	6^{2}	6^{7}
(Russia) Alexey Vatutin	7^{7}	7^{9}
(Australia) Alex de Minaur	4	2
7	(Greece) Stefanos Tsitsipas	6	6

Qualifying competition
(Russia) Alexey Vatutin	2	6^{6}
7	(Greece) Stefanos Tsitsipas	6	7^{8}
