= 2017 Istanbul Open – Doubles =

Doubles
- 2017 Istanbul Open

Final
- Champions: (Czech Republic) Roman Jebavý (Czech Republic) Jiří Veselý
- Runners-up: (Turkey) Tuna Altuna (Italy) Alessandro Motti
- Score: 6–0, 6–0

Events
Singles	Doubles
← 2016 ·	Istanbul Open	· 2018 →

Flavio Cipolla and Dudi Sela were the defending champions, but chose not to participate this year.

Roman Jebavý and Jiří Veselý won the title, defeating Tuna Altuna and Alessandro Motti in the final, 6–0, 6–0.

== Seeds ==
1. (United States) Nicholas Monroe / (New Zealand) Artem Sitak (quarterfinals)
2. (Mexico) Santiago González / (United Kingdom) Dominic Inglot (quarterfinals)
3. (Israel) Jonathan Erlich / (United States) Scott Lipsky (quarterfinals)
4. (Argentina) Guillermo Durán / (Argentina) Andrés Molteni (first round)

== Draw ==
=== Key ===
- Q = Qualifier
- WC = Wild card
- LL = Lucky loser
- Alt = Alternate
- SE = Special exempt
- PR = Protected ranking
- ITF = ITF entry
- JE = Junior exempt
- w/o = Walkover
- r = Retired
- d = Defaulted
- SR = Special ranking

=== Draw ===
First round
1	(United States) N Monroe (New Zealand) A Sitak	6	6^{3}	[10]
(Sweden) J Brunström (Australia) M Reid	2	7^{7}	[8]
(Croatia) A Šančić (Canada) A Shamasdin	6	7^{7}
(United Kingdom) A Bedene (United Kingdom) K Skupski	2	6^{3}
3	(Israel) J Erlich (United States) S Lipsky	7^{7}	6
(Brazil) R Dutra Silva (Italy) P Lorenzi	6^{4}	2
(Serbia) D Lajović (Serbia) V Troicki	6	5	[4]
WC	(Turkey) T Altuna (Italy) A Motti	4	7	[10]
WC	(Turkey) A Çelikbilek (Turkey) C İlkel	3	5
(Chile) H Podlipnik-Castillo (Belarus) A Vasilevski	6	7
(Australia) J-P Smith (Australia) J Thompson	7^{8}	7^{7}
4	(Argentina) G Durán (Argentina) A Molteni	6^{6}	6^{4}
(Czech Republic) R Jebavý (Czech Republic) J Veselý	7	7^{7}
(United States) J Cerretani (Austria) P Oswald	5	6^{4}
(Georgia (country)) N Basilashvili (Russia) M Elgin	3	4
2	(Mexico) S González (United Kingdom) D Inglot	6	6

Quarterfinals
1	(United States) N Monroe (New Zealand) A Sitak	3	6	[8]
(Croatia) A Šančić (Canada) A Shamasdin	6	1	[10]
3	(Israel) J Erlich (United States) S Lipsky	5	6	[7]
WC	(Turkey) T Altuna (Italy) A Motti	7	3	[10]
(Chile) H Podlipnik-Castillo (Belarus) A Vasilevski	3	1
(Australia) J-P Smith (Australia) J Thompson	6	6
(Czech Republic) R Jebavý (Czech Republic) J Veselý	6	1	[10]
2	(Mexico) S González (United Kingdom) D Inglot	2	6	[4]

Semifinals
(Croatia) A Šančić (Canada) A Shamasdin	6	1	[5]
WC	(Turkey) T Altuna (Italy) A Motti	3	6	[10]
(Australia) J-P Smith (Australia) J Thompson	6^{4}	5
(Czech Republic) R Jebavý (Czech Republic) J Veselý	7^{7}	7

Final
WC	(Turkey) T Altuna (Italy) A Motti	0	0
(Czech Republic) R Jebavý (Czech Republic) J Veselý	6	6
