= 2015 Istanbul Open – Singles =

Singles
- 2015 Istanbul Open

Final
- Champion: (Switzerland) Roger Federer
- Runner-up: (Uruguay) Pablo Cuevas
- Score: 6–3, 7–6^{(13–11)}

Details
- Draw: 28
- Seeds: 8

Events
Singles	Doubles
Istanbul Open	· 2016 →

This was the first edition of the tournament.

Roger Federer won his 84th ATP title, defeating Pablo Cuevas in the final, 6–3, 7–6^{(13–11)}.

== Seeds ==
The top four seeds receive a bye into the second round.

1. (Switzerland) Roger Federer (champion)
2. (Bulgaria) Grigor Dimitrov (semifinals)
3. (Uruguay) Pablo Cuevas (final)
4. (Colombia) Santiago Giraldo (quarterfinals)
5. (Austria) Andreas Haider-Maurer (first round)
6. (Kazakhstan) Mikhail Kukushkin (second round)
7. (Russia) Mikhail Youzhny (first round)
8. (Argentina) Diego Schwartzman (semifinals)

== Draw ==
=== Key ===
- Q = Qualifier
- WC = Wild card
- LL = Lucky loser
- Alt = Alternate
- SE = Special exempt
- PR = Protected ranking
- ITF = ITF entry
- JE = Junior exempt
- w/o = Walkover
- r = Retired
- d = Defaulted
- SR = Special ranking

=== Finals ===
Semifinals
1	(Switzerland) Roger Federer	2	6	7
8	(Argentina) Diego Schwartzman	6	2	5
3	(Uruguay) Pablo Cuevas	6	6
2	(Bulgaria) Grigor Dimitrov	2	4

Final
1	(Switzerland) Roger Federer	6	7^{13}
3	(Uruguay) Pablo Cuevas	3	6^{11}

=== Top half ===
First round
(Turkey) M İlhan	3	4
(Finland) J Nieminen	6	6
(Spain) D Gimeno Traver	6	6
WC	(Turkey) C İlkel	1	4
Q	(Kazakhstan) A Nedovyesov	3	4
6	(Kazakhstan) M Kukushkin	6	6
(Bosnia and Herzegovina) D Džumhur	3	3
WC	(Russia) A Rublev	6	6
(Austria) J Melzer	5
(Belgium) S Darcis	2^{r}
Q	(Slovenia) B Kavčič	2	1
8	(Argentina) D Schwartzman	6	6

Second round
1	(Switzerland) R Federer	6	7
(Finland) J Nieminen	2	5
(Spain) D Gimeno Traver	6	6
6	(Kazakhstan) M Kukushkin	3	3
4	(Colombia) S Giraldo	6	1	6
WC	(Russia) A Rublev	4	6	3
(Austria) J Melzer	0	2
8	(Argentina) D Schwartzman	6	6

Quarterfinals
1	(Switzerland) R Federer	7^{7}	6^{5}	6
(Spain) D Gimeno Traver	6^{3}	7^{7}	3
4	(Colombia) S Giraldo	6	2	2
8	(Argentina) D Schwartzman	0	6	6

Semifinals
1	(Switzerland) R Federer	2	6	7
8	(Argentina) D Schwartzman	6	2	5

=== Bottom half ===
First round
7	(Russia) M Youzhny	6^{5}	3
(Brazil) T Bellucci	7^{7}	6
(Uzbekistan) D Istomin	6	6
(France) B Paire	3	4
(Russia) A Kuznetsov	6^{1}	4
Q	(Russia) T Gabashvili	7^{7}	6
5	(Austria) A Haider-Maurer	5	3
(Croatia) I Dodig	7	6
Q	(Australia) T Kokkinakis	4	5
(Serbia) D Lajović	6	7
(Kazakhstan) A Golubev	6	6
WC	(Georgia (country)) N Basilashvili	1	3

Second round
(Brazil) T Bellucci	7^{7}	6
(Uzbekistan) D Istomin	6^{4}	3
Q	(Russia) T Gabashvili	6	4	4
3	(Uruguay) P Cuevas	4	6	6
(Croatia) I Dodig	5	7^{7}	6
(Serbia) D Lajović	7	6^{1}	4
(Kazakhstan) A Golubev	3	2
2	(Bulgaria) G Dimitrov	6	6

Quarterfinals
(Brazil) T Bellucci	5	3
3	(Uruguay) P Cuevas	7	6
(Croatia) I Dodig	4	3
2	(Bulgaria) G Dimitrov	6	6

Semifinals
3	(Uruguay) P Cuevas	6	6
2	(Bulgaria) G Dimitrov	2	4

== Qualifying ==
=== Seeds ===
1. (Slovenia) Blaž Kavčič (qualified)
2. (Russia) Teymuraz Gabashvili (qualified)
3. (Australia) Thanasi Kokkinakis (qualified)
4. (Kazakhstan) Aleksandr Nedovyesov (qualified)
5. (Moldova) Radu Albot (qualifying competition)
6. (Australia) John Millman (second round)
7. (Hungary) Márton Fucsovics (qualifying competition)
8. (Netherlands) Thiemo de Bakker (first round)

=== Qualifiers ===
1. (Slovenia) Blaž Kavčič
2. (Russia) Teymuraz Gabashvili
3. (Australia) Thanasi Kokkinakis
4. (Kazakhstan) Aleksandr Nedovyesov

=== Qualifying draw ===
==== First qualifier ====
First round
1	(Slovenia) Blaž Kavčič	6	1	7
(Romania) Dragoș Dima	3	6	5
WC	(Turkey) Efe Yurtaçan	3	6	7^{7}
(Poland) Andriej Kapaś	6	1	6^{2}
(Austria) Philipp Oswald	6	7
(Georgia (country)) Aleksandre Metreveli	1	5
WC	(Turkey) Tuna Altuna	0	3
7	(Hungary) Márton Fucsovics	6	6

Second round
1	(Slovenia) Blaž Kavčič	6	6
WC	(Turkey) Efe Yurtaçan	0	1
(Austria) Philipp Oswald	6	3	4
7	(Hungary) Márton Fucsovics	3	6	6

Qualifying competition
1	(Slovenia) Blaž Kavčič	6	6
7	(Hungary) Márton Fucsovics	0	1

==== Second qualifier ====
First round
2	(Russia) Teymuraz Gabashvili	6	6
(Bosnia and Herzegovina) Aldin Šetkić	2	3
WC	(Turkey) Sarp Ağabigün	7^{8}	5	0
(Russia) Fedor Chervyakov	6^{6}	7	6
(Bulgaria) Dimitar Kuzmanov	7^{7}	4	4
(New Zealand) Michael Venus	6^{5}	6	6
WC	(Turkey) Altuğ Çelikbilek	3	4
5	(Moldova) Radu Albot	6	6

Second round
2	(Russia) Teymuraz Gabashvili	6	6
(Russia) Fedor Chervyakov	1	3
(New Zealand) Michael Venus	2	5
5	(Moldova) Radu Albot	6	7

Qualifying competition
2	(Russia) Teymuraz Gabashvili	7	6
5	(Moldova) Radu Albot	5	2

==== Third qualifier ====
First round
3	(Australia) Thanasi Kokkinakis	6	6
(Turkey) Barkin Yalcinkale	1	2
(Croatia) Nikola Mektić	6	6
(Estonia) Jürgen Zopp	4	0
(United Kingdom) Daniel Cox	6^{8}	6	6^{4}
(Italy) Lorenzo Giustino	7^{10}	2	7^{7}
(Italy) Roberto Marcora	0	6	6
8	(Netherlands) Thiemo de Bakker	6	2	3

Second round
3	(Australia) Thanasi Kokkinakis	6	7^{9}
(Croatia) Nikola Mektić	4	6^{7}
(Italy) Lorenzo Giustino	6	6^{3}	6
(Italy) Roberto Marcora	4	7^{7}	3

Qualifying competition
3	(Australia) Thanasi Kokkinakis	6	1
(Italy) Lorenzo Giustino	0	0^{r}

==== Fourth qualifier ====
First round
4	(Kazakhstan) Aleksandr Nedovyesov	6	6
(Croatia) Mate Pavić	1	2
(Austria) Michael Linzer	7^{7}	6
(Romania) Petru-Alexandru Luncanu	6^{5}	3
(Monaco) Benjamin Balleret	5	1
(Russia) Evgeny Donskoy	7	6
(Ukraine) Vadim Alekseenko	3	0
6	(Australia) John Millman	6	6

Second round
4	(Kazakhstan) Aleksandr Nedovyesov	6	6
(Austria) Michael Linzer	3	3
(Russia) Evgeny Donskoy	6	6
6	(Australia) John Millman	4	1

Qualifying competition
4	(Kazakhstan) Aleksandr Nedovyesov	6^{4}	7	6
(Russia) Evgeny Donskoy	7^{7}	5	3
