= 2018 Istanbul Open – Singles =

Singles
- 2018 Istanbul Open

Final
- Champion: (Japan) Taro Daniel
- Runner-up: (Tunisia) Malek Jaziri
- Score: 7–6^{(7–4)}, 6–4

Details
- Draw: 28 (4 Q / 3 WC )
- Seeds: 8

Events
Singles	Doubles
← 2017 ·	Istanbul Open

Marin Čilić was the defending champion, but lost in the second round to Malek Jaziri.

Taro Daniel won his first ATP World Tour title, defeating Jaziri in the final, 7–6^{(7–4)}, 6–4.

== Seeds ==
The top four seeds receive a bye into the second round.

1. (Croatia) Marin Čilić (second round)
2. (Bosnia and Herzegovina) Damir Džumhur (second round)
3. (Italy) Andreas Seppi (second round)
4. (Slovenia) Aljaž Bedene (second round)
5. (Italy) Paolo Lorenzi (quarterfinals)
6. (Serbia) Viktor Troicki (second round)
7. (Czech Republic) Jiří Veselý (quarterfinals)
8. (Georgia (country)) Nikoloz Basilashvili (first round)

== Draw ==
=== Key ===
- Q = Qualifier
- WC = Wild card
- LL = Lucky loser
- Alt = Alternate
- SE = Special exempt
- PR = Protected ranking
- ITF = ITF entry
- JE = Junior exempt
- w/o = Walkover
- r = Retired
- d = Defaulted
- SR = Special ranking

=== Finals ===
Semifinals
(Tunisia) Malek Jaziri	6	6
(Serbia) Laslo Đere	3	2
(Japan) Taro Daniel	6	4	6
(France) Jérémy Chardy	3	6	4

Final
(Tunisia) Malek Jaziri	6^{4}	4
(Japan) Taro Daniel	7^{7}	6

=== Top half ===
First round
(Tunisia) M Jaziri	6	6
WC	(Turkey) M İlhan	1	2
Q	(Brazil) T Monteiro	6	3	6
(Austria) G Melzer	2	6	1
Q	(Spain) D Gimeno Traver	3	1
7	(Czech Republic) J Veselý	6	6
(Serbia) L Đere	7^{7}	7^{8}
(Uzbekistan) D Istomin	6^{5}	6^{6}
Q	(Argentina) M Trungelliti	4	6	6
Q	(Sweden) E Ymer	6	3	2
WC	(Turkey) C İlkel	2	3
5	(Italy) P Lorenzi	6	6

Second round
1	(Croatia) M Čilić	4	2
(Tunisia) M Jaziri	6	6
Q	(Brazil) T Monteiro	2	6	6^{3}
7	(Czech Republic) J Veselý	6	2	7^{7}
3	(Italy) A Seppi	3	7^{7}	3
(Serbia) L Đere	6	6^{4}	6
Q	(Argentina) M Trungelliti	2	6^{5}
5	(Italy) P Lorenzi	6	7^{7}

Quarterfinals
(Tunisia) M Jaziri	3	6	6
7	(Czech Republic) J Veselý	6	4	1
(Serbia) L Đere	6^{5}	7	7^{7}
5	(Italy) P Lorenzi	7^{7}	5	6^{3}

Semifinals
(Tunisia) M Jaziri	6	6
(Serbia) L Đere	3	2

=== Bottom half ===
First round
6	(Serbia) V Troicki	3	6	7
WC	(Australia) B Tomic	6	0	5
(Moldova) R Albot	4	4
(Brazil) R Dutra Silva	6	6
(Japan) T Daniel	7	6
(Italy) M Berrettini	5	3
8	(Georgia (country)) N Basilashvili	5	3
(France) J Chardy	7	6
(Australia) J Millman	4	0
(Serbia) D Lajović	6	6
(Italy) T Fabbiano	6	6
(Russia) M Youzhny	1	1

Second round
6	(Serbia) V Troicki	2	3
(Brazil) R Dutra Silva	6	6
(Japan) T Daniel	6	6
4	(Slovenia) A Bedene	2	2
(France) J Chardy	4	7^{7}	6
(Serbia) D Lajović	6	6^{3}	2
(Italy) T Fabbiano	6	0	6
2	(Bosnia and Herzegovina) D Džumhur	2	6	2

Quarterfinals
(Brazil) R Dutra Silva	6	1	4
(Japan) T Daniel	1	6	6
(France) J Chardy	6	6
(Italy) T Fabbiano	2	2

Semifinals
(Japan) T Daniel	6	4	6
(France) J Chardy	3	6	4

== Qualifying ==
=== Seeds ===
1. (India) Ramkumar Ramanathan (qualifying competition)
2. (Belarus) Ilya Ivashka (first round)
3. (Brazil) Thiago Monteiro (qualified)
4. (Sweden) Elias Ymer (qualified)
5. (Austria) Sebastian Ofner (first round)
6. (Croatia) Viktor Galović (first round)
7. (Poland) Hubert Hurkacz (qualifying competition)
8. (Italy) Stefano Napolitano (qualifying competition)

=== Qualifiers ===
1. (Argentina) Marco Trungelliti
2. (Spain) Daniel Gimeno Traver
3. (Brazil) Thiago Monteiro
4. (Sweden) Elias Ymer

=== Qualifying draw ===
==== First qualifier ====
First round
1	(India) Ramkumar Ramanathan	6	6
(Bosnia and Herzegovina) Aldin Šetkić	4	3
(Argentina) Marco Trungelliti	6	6
5	(Austria) Sebastian Ofner	3	2

Qualifying competition
1	(India) Ramkumar Ramanathan	4	3
(Argentina) Marco Trungelliti	6	6

==== Second qualifier ====
First round
2	(Belarus) Ilya Ivashka	6^{2}	2
(Spain) Daniel Gimeno Traver	7^{7}	6
(Germany) Tobias Kamke	2	4
8	(Italy) Stefano Napolitano	6	6

Qualifying competition
(Spain) Daniel Gimeno Traver	7^{7}	6
8	(Italy) Stefano Napolitano	6^{5}	3

==== Third qualifier ====
First round
3	(Brazil) Thiago Monteiro	6	6
WC	(Turkey) Mert Alkaya	3	1
(Spain) Tommy Robredo	6	6
6	(Croatia) Viktor Galović	3	4

Qualifying competition
3	(Brazil) Thiago Monteiro	6	7^{7}
(Spain) Tommy Robredo	3	6^{5}

==== Fourth qualifier ====
First round
4	(Sweden) Elias Ymer	7^{8}	6
(Czech Republic) Václav Šafránek	6^{6}	1
WC	(Turkey) Sarp Ağabigün	2	3
7	(Poland) Hubert Hurkacz	6	6

Qualifying competition
4	(Sweden) Elias Ymer	6^{4}	6	7
7	(Poland) Hubert Hurkacz	7^{7}	4	5
