= 2016 Istanbul Open =

- Date: 25 April – 1 May 2016
- Edition: 2nd
- Category: World Tour 250
- Draw: 28S / 16D
- Prize money: €426,530
- Surface: Clay / outdoor
- Location: Istanbul, Turkey
- Venue: Koza World of Sports Arena

Champions

Singles
- (Argentina) Diego Schwartzman

Doubles
- (Italy) Flavio Cipolla / (Israel) Dudi Sela
← 2015 ·	Istanbul Open	· 2017 →

The 2016 Istanbul Open (also known as the TEB BNP Paribas Istanbul Open for sponsorship purposes) was a men's tennis tournament played on outdoor clay courts. It was the second edition of the Istanbul Open, and an ATP World Tour 250 event. It took place at the Koza World of Sports Arena in Istanbul, Turkey, from 25 April until 1 May 2016. Unseeded Diego Schwartzman won the singles title.

== Finals ==
=== Singles ===
(Argentina) Diego Schwartzman defeated (Bulgaria) Grigor Dimitrov, 6–7^{(5–7)}, 7–6^{(7–4)}, 6–0

- It was Schwartzman's only singles title of the year and the first of his career.

=== Doubles ===
(Italy) Flavio Cipolla / (Israel) Dudi Sela defeated (Argentina) Andrés Molteni / (Argentina) Diego Schwartzman, 6–3, 5–7, [10–7]

== Singles main draw entrants ==
=== Seeds ===
Country	Player	Rank^{1}	Seed
AUS	Bernard Tomic	21	1
BUL	Grigor Dimitrov	28	2
CRO	Ivo Karlović	29	3
ARG	Federico Delbonis	40	4
ESP	Marcel Granollers	50	5
CZE	Jiří Veselý	53	6
RUS	Teymuraz Gabashvili	54	7
ESP	Albert Ramos-Viñolas	55	8

- Rankings are as of April 18, 2016.

=== Other entrants ===
The following players received wildcards into the main draw:

- (Turkey) Marsel İlhan
- (Turkey) Cem İlkel
- (Russia) Karen Khachanov

The following players received entry via the qualifying draw:

- (Argentina) Carlos Berlocq
- (Argentina) Renzo Olivo
- (Russia) Andrey Rublev
- (Romania) Adrian Ungur

The following player received entry as a lucky loser:

- (Argentina) Máximo González

=== Withdrawals ===
Before the tournament

- (Argentina) Juan Mónaco → replaced by (Serbia) Filip Krajinović
- (France) Lucas Pouille → replaced by (Argentina) Máximo González
- (United States) Rajeev Ram → replaced by (Argentina) Facundo Bagnis

== Doubles main draw entrants ==
=== Seeds ===
Country	Player	Country	Player	Rank^{1}	Seed
GBR	Dominic Inglot	SWE	Robert Lindstedt	59	1
USA	Nicholas Monroe	CRO	Mate Pavić	88	2
ARG	Guillermo Durán	ARG	Máximo González	103	3
NED	Wesley Koolhof	NED	Matwé Middelkoop	114	4

- Rankings are as of April 18, 2016.

=== Other entrants ===
The following pairs received wildcards into the doubles main draw:

- (Turkey) Tuna Altuna / (Croatia) Dino Marcan
- (Turkey) Cem İlkel / (Australia) Bernard Tomic

=== Withdrawals ===
During the tournament

- (Sweden) Robert Lindstedt (abdominal injury)
- (France) Adrian Mannarino (hip injury)
