= 2017 Istanbul Open =

- Date: 1–7 May 2017
- Edition: 3rd
- Category: World Tour 250
- Draw: 28S / 16D
- Prize money: €439,005
- Surface: Clay / outdoor
- Location: Istanbul, Turkey
- Venue: Koza World of Sports Arena

Champions

Singles
- (Croatia) Marin Čilić

Doubles
- (Czech Republic) Roman Jebavý / (Czech Republic) Jiří Veselý
← 2016 ·	Istanbul Open	· 2018 →

The 2017 Istanbul Open (also known as the TEB BNP Paribas Istanbul Open for sponsorship purposes) was a men's tennis tournament played on outdoor clay courts. It was the third edition of the Istanbul Open, and an ATP World Tour 250 event. It took place at the Koza World of Sports Arena in Istanbul, Turkey, from 1–7 May 2017.

== Singles main-draw entrants ==
=== Seeds ===
Country	Player	Rank^{1}	Seed
CAN	Milos Raonic	6	1
CRO	Marin Čilić	8	2
ARG	Diego Schwartzman	34	3
ITA	Paolo Lorenzi	38	4
SRB	Viktor Troicki	39	5
AUS	Bernard Tomic	41	6
CRO	Borna Ćorić	48	7
BEL	Steve Darcis	53	8

- Rankings are as of April 24, 2017.

=== Other entrants ===
The following players received wildcards into the main draw:

- (Croatia) Marin Čilić
- (Hungary) Márton Fucsovics
- (Turkey) Cem İlkel

The following player received entry as a special exempt:

- (Serbia) Laslo Đere

The following players received entry via the qualifying draw:

- (Italy) Riccardo Bellotti
- (Germany) Daniel Brands
- (Spain) Adrián Menéndez Maceiras
- (Greece) Stefanos Tsitsipas

The following player received entry as a lucky loser:

- (Egypt) Mohamed Safwat

=== Withdrawals ===
Before the tournament

- (Moldova) Radu Albot →replaced by (Egypt) Mohamed Safwat

== Doubles main-draw entrants ==
=== Seeds ===
Country	Player	Country	Player	Rank^{1}	Seed
USA	Nicholas Monroe	NZL	Artem Sitak	94	1
MEX	Santiago González	GBR	Dominic Inglot	112	2
ISR	Jonathan Erlich	USA	Scott Lipsky	122	3
ARG	Guillermo Durán	ARG	Andrés Molteni	134	4

- Rankings are as of April 24, 2017.

=== Other entrants ===
The following pairs received wildcards into the doubles main draw:

- (Turkey) Tuna Altuna / (Italy) Alessandro Motti
- (Turkey) Altuğ Çelikbilek / (Turkey) Cem İlkel

== Champions ==
=== Singles ===
- (Croatia) Marin Čilić def. (Canada) Milos Raonic, 7–6^{(7–3)}, 6–3

=== Doubles ===
- (Czech Republic) Roman Jebavý / (Czech Republic) Jiří Veselý def. (Turkey) Tuna Altuna / (Italy) Alessandro Motti 6–0, 6–0
