= 2018 Istanbul Open – Doubles =

Doubles
- 2018 Istanbul Open

Final
- Champions: (United Kingdom) Dominic Inglot (Sweden) Robert Lindstedt
- Runners-up: (Japan) Ben McLachlan (United States) Nicholas Monroe
- Score: 3–6, 6–3, [10–8]

Details
- Draw: 16
- Seeds: 4

Events
Singles	Doubles
← 2017 ·	Istanbul Open

Roman Jebavý and Jiří Veselý were the defending champions, but Veselý chose not to participate this year. Jebavý played alongside Florin Mergea, but lost in the first round to Dominic Inglot and Robert Lindstedt.

Inglot and Lindstedt went on to win the title, defeating Ben McLachlan and Nicholas Monroe in the final, 3–6, 6–3, [10–8].

== Seeds ==
1. (Japan) Ben McLachlan / (United States) Nicholas Monroe (final)
2. (Poland) Marcin Matkowski / (India) Divij Sharan (semifinals)
3. (Chile) Hans Podlipnik-Castillo / (Belarus) Andrei Vasilevski (first round)
4. (United Kingdom) Ken Skupski / (United Kingdom) Neal Skupski (quarterfinals)

== Draw ==
=== Key ===
- Q = Qualifier
- WC = Wild card
- LL = Lucky loser
- Alt = Alternate
- SE = Special exempt
- PR = Protected ranking
- ITF = ITF entry
- JE = Junior exempt
- w/o = Walkover
- r = Retired
- d = Defaulted
- SR = Special ranking

=== Draw ===
First round
1	(Japan) B McLachlan (United States) N Monroe	6	6
WC	(Turkey) T Altuna (Turkey) A Yüksel	2	3
(Ukraine) D Molchanov (Croatia) F Škugor	6	7^{12}
(Germany) A Begemann (Croatia) A Šančić	1	6^{10}
3	(Chile) H Podlipnik-Castillo (Belarus) A Vasilevski	2	4
(Monaco) R Arneodo (France) H Nys	6	6
(United States) J Cerretani (Canada) D Nestor	6	6
PR	(Italy) D Bracciali (Tunisia) M Jaziri	4	2
(Czech Republic) R Jebavý (Romania) F Mergea	6^{4}	1
(United Kingdom) D Inglot (Sweden) R Lindstedt	7^{7}	6
WC	(Turkey) C İlkel (Australia) B Tomic	5	1
4	(United Kingdom) K Skupski (United Kingdom) N Skupski	7	6
(Italy) M Berrettini (Italy) P Lorenzi	2	2
(Serbia) D Lajović (Serbia) V Troicki	6	6
(Moldova) R Albot (Georgia (country)) N Basilashvili	5	3
2	(Poland) M Matkowski (India) D Sharan	7	6

Quarterfinals
1	(Japan) B McLachlan (United States) N Monroe	6	6^{4}	[10]
(Ukraine) D Molchanov (Croatia) F Škugor	4	7^{7}	[8]
(Monaco) R Arneodo (France) H Nys	4	6	[4]
(United States) J Cerretani (Canada) D Nestor	6	4	[10]
(United Kingdom) D Inglot (Sweden) R Lindstedt	7^{7}	6
4	(United Kingdom) K Skupski (United Kingdom) N Skupski	6^{3}	3
(Serbia) D Lajović (Serbia) V Troicki
2	(Poland) M Matkowski (India) D Sharan	w/o

Semifinals
1	(Japan) B McLachlan (United States) N Monroe	6	2	[10]
(United States) J Cerretani (Canada) D Nestor	2	6	[6]
(United Kingdom) D Inglot (Sweden) R Lindstedt	6	2	[10]
2	(Poland) M Matkowski (India) D Sharan	4	6	[4]

Final
1	(Japan) B McLachlan (United States) N Monroe	6	3	[8]
(United Kingdom) D Inglot (Sweden) R Lindstedt	3	6	[10]
