= Alessandro Motti =

Italian tennis player

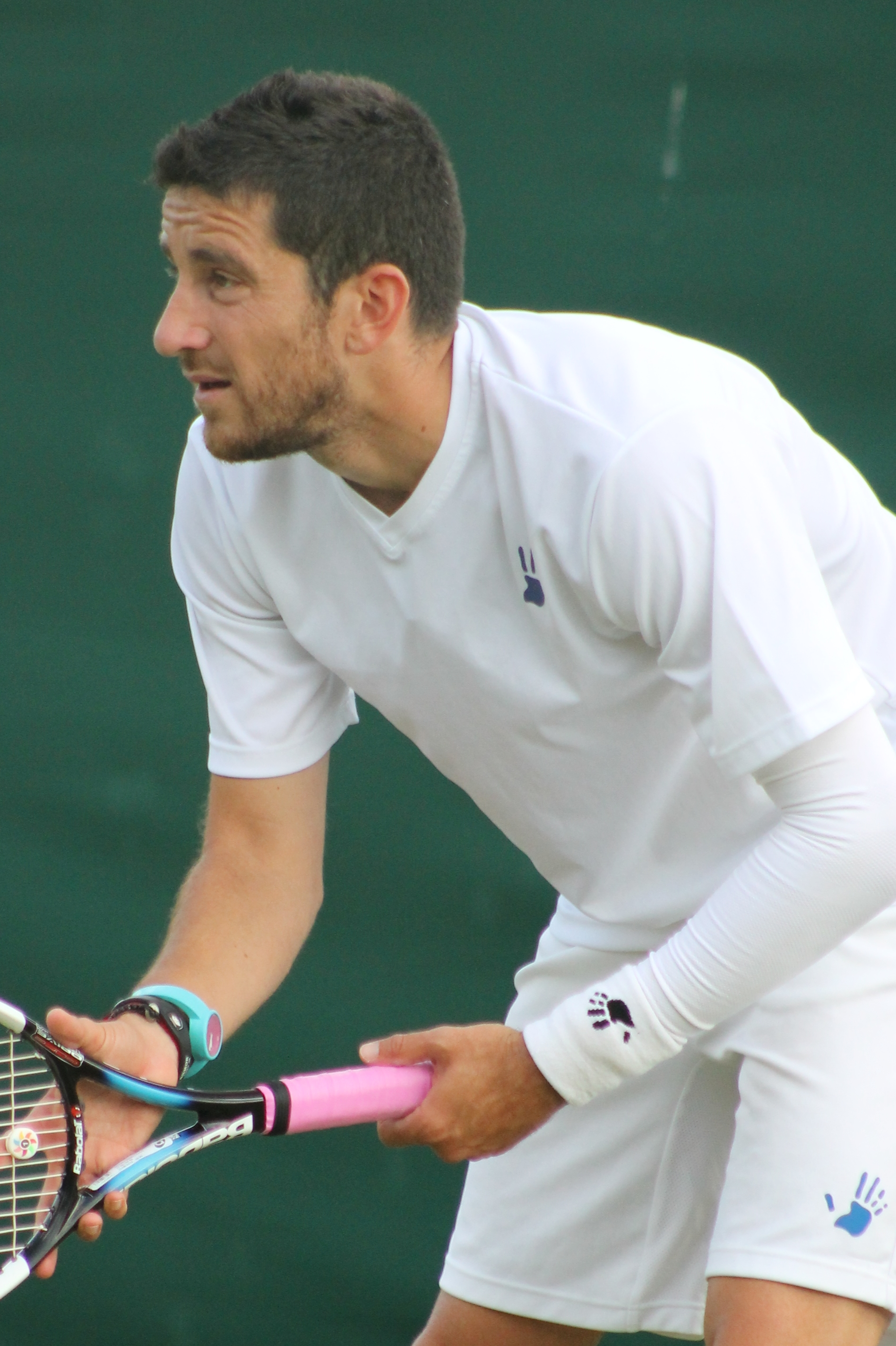
- Motti at the 2015 Wimbledon Championships
- Country (sports): Italy
- Born: 21 February 1979 (age 47) Correggio, Italy
- Height: 1.85 m (6 ft 1 in)
- Retired: 2023
- Plays: Left-handed (one-handed backhand)
- Coach: Ugo Bellentani
- Prize money: US$300,900

Singles
- Career record: 0–0
- Career titles: 0
- Highest ranking: No. 536 (12 August 2004)

Doubles
- Career record: 8–24
- Career titles: 0
- Highest ranking: No. 91 (14 September 2009)

Grand Slam doubles results
- French Open: 1R (2009)
- Wimbledon: 1R (2009, 2011)

Alessandro Motti (born 21 February 1979) is an Italian tennis coach and former professional tennis player who specialises in doubles. He has a career-high doubles ranking of world No. 91, achieved on 14 September 2009.

Motti reached his only ATP World Tour doubles final at the age of 38, partnering Tuna Altuna at the 2017 Istanbul Open. They lost it to Roman Jebavý and Jiří Veselý with a so-called double bagel.

In 2023, Motti became the coach of Antoine Escoffier.

== ATP career finals ==
=== Doubles: 1 (1 runner-up) ===
Legend Grand Slam Tournaments (0–0) ATP World Tour Finals (0–0) ATP World Tour Masters 1000 (0–0) ATP World Tour 500 Series (0–0) ATP World Tour 250 Series (0–1)	Finals by surface Hard (0–0) Clay (0–1) Grass (0–0) Carpet (0–0)

Result	W–L	Date	Tournament	Tier	Surface	Partner	Opponents	Score
Loss	0–1	May 2017	Istanbul Open, Turkey	250 Series	Clay	(Turkey) Tuna Altuna	(Czech Republic) Roman Jebavý (Czech Republic) Jiří Veselý	0–6, 0–6

== ATP Challenger and ITF Futures titles ==
=== Doubles: 39 ===
Legend ATP Challenger (16) ITF Futures (23)	Titles by surface Hard (7) Clay (30) Grass (0) Carpet (1)

No.	Date	Tournament	Tier	Surface	Partner	Opponents	Score
1.	Jun 2003	Finland F1	Futures	Clay	(Italy) Fabio Colangelo	(Russia) Michail Elgin (Russia) Ivan Syrov	7–5, 7–5
2.	Sep 2003	Italy F10	Futures	Clay	(Italy) Uros Vico	(Uzbekistan) Farrukh Dustov (Italy) Thomas Holzer	6–2, 6–2
3.	Nov 2003	Aruba F1	Futures	Hard	(France) Stéphane Robert	(Netherlands) Bart Beks (Netherlands) Paul Logtens	6–4, 6–0
4.	Apr 2004	Italy F4	Futures	Clay	(Italy) Fabio Colangelo	(Slovakia) Viktor Bruthans (Slovakia) Igor Zelenay	6–4, 6–1
5.	May 2004	Italy F9	Futures	Clay	(Italy) Simone Vagnozzi	(Brazil) Rodrigo Monte (Brazil) Márcio Torres	3–0 ret.
6.	May 2004	Italy F10	Futures	Clay	(Italy) Flavio Cipolla	(Brazil) Júlio Silva (Brazil) Rogério Dutra da Silva	6–4, 6–1
7.	Jun 2004	Italy F11	Futures	Clay	(Italy) Giancarlo Petrazzuolo	(Italy) Flavio Cipolla (Italy) Francesco Piccari	6–4, 6–4
8.	Jun 2004	Italy F12	Futures	Carpet	(Italy) Giancarlo Petrazzuolo	(Italy) Alessandro da Col (Italy) Francesco Piccari	1–0 ret.
9.	Aug 2004	Germany F14	Futures	Clay	(Kazakhstan) Evgeny Korolev	(Germany) Tom Dennhardt (Germany) Robert Jammer-Luhr	7–6^{(7–5)}, 6–1
10.	Aug 2004	France F20	Futures	Hard (i)	(Spain) Daniel Muñoz-de la Nava	(France) Gilles Simon (France) Cyril Spanelis	6–2, 6–2
11.	Nov 2004	China F1	Futures	Hard	(Italy) Flavio Cipolla	(Chinese Taipei) Chen Ti (United States) Shuon Madden	7–6^{(7–4)}, 6–1
12.	Nov 2004	China F3	Futures	Hard	(Italy) Flavio Cipolla	(China) Zhang Yu (China) Zhu Benqiang	7–6^{(7–3)}, 6–2
13.	Mar 2005	Italy F3	Futures	Clay	(Italy) Flavio Cipolla	(Italy) Cristian Brandi (Italy) Simone Vagnozzi	7–5, 6–4
14.	Apr 2005	Italy F9	Futures	Clay	(Italy) Flavio Cipolla	(Argentina) Diego Álvarez (Argentina) Diego Junqueira	6–3, 6–2
15.	Jun 2005	Slovenia F2	Futures	Clay	(France) Vincent Baudat	(Cyprus) Photos Kallias (Germany) Bastian Knittel	7–6^{(7–5)}, 6–1
16.	Jul 2005	Mantova, Italy	Challenger	Clay	(Italy) Flavio Cipolla	(Spain) Salvador Navarro (Spain) Óscar Serrano	5–7, 6–3, 6–3
17.	Mar 2006	Great Britain F3	Futures	Hard	(Spain) Daniel Muñoz-de la Nava	(France) Jean-François Bachelot (Pakistan) Aisam-ul-Haq Qureshi	6–3, 6–4
18.	May 2006	Italy F16	Futures	Clay	(Argentina) Diego Álvarez	(Italy) Marco Crugnola (Italy) Francesco Piccari	7–6^{(7–4)}, 3–6, 6–1
19.	Sep 2007	Todi, Italy	Challenger	Clay	(Italy) Daniele Giorgini	(Italy) Enrico Burzi (Italy) Stefano Galvani	3–6, 7–5, [10–4]
20.	Aug 2008	Vigo, Spain	Challenger	Clay	(Italy) Marco Crugnola	(Spain) Pedro Clar-Rosselló (Spain) Pablo Martín-Adalia	6–3, 4–6, [10–4]
21.	Sep 2008	Naples, Italy	Challenger	Clay	(Italy) Leonardo Azzaro	(Bosnia and Herzegovina) Ismar Gorčić (Italy) Antonio Maiorano	6–7^{(5–7)}, 6–3, [10–7]
22.	Apr 2009	Rome, Italy	Challenger	Clay	(Germany) Simon Greul	(Italy) Daniele Bracciali (Italy) Filippo Volandri	6–4, 7–5
23.	May 2009	Zagreb, Croatia	Challenger	Clay	(Australia) Peter Luczak	(United States) Brendan Evans (United States) Ryan Sweeting	6–4, 6–4
24.	Aug 2009	Como, Italy	Challenger	Clay	(Italy) Marco Crugnola	(Philippines) Treat Conrad Huey (India) Harsh Mankad	7–6^{(7–3)}, 6–2
25.	Sep 2009	Genoa, Italy	Challenger	Clay	(Italy) Daniele Bracciali	(Israel) Amir Hadad (Israel) Harel Levy	6–4, 6–2
26.	Jul 2010	Orbetello, Italy	Challenger	Clay	(Italy) Alessio di Mauro	(Croatia) Nikola Mektić (Croatia) Ivan Zovko	6–2, 3–6, [10–3]
27.	Aug 2010	Italy F22	Futures	Clay	(Italy) Marco Crugnola	(France) Olivier Charroin (France) Romain Jouan	3–6, 6–3, [10–8]
28.	Mar 2011	Marrakech, Morocco	Challenger	Clay	(Australia) Peter Luczak	(United States) James Cerretani (Canada) Adil Shamasdin	7–6^{(7–5)}, 7–6^{(7–3)}
29.	Apr 2011	Rome, Italy	Challenger	Clay	(Slovakia) Martin Kližan	(Italy) Thomas Fabbiano (Italy) Walter Trusendi	7–6^{(7–3)}, 6–4
30.	Jul 2011	San Benedetto, Italy	Challenger	Clay	(Italy) Alessio di Mauro	(Italy) Daniele Giorgini (Italy) Stefano Travaglia	7–6^{(7–5)}, 4–6, [10–7]
31.	Apr 2012	Napoli, Italy	Challenger	Clay	(Lithuania) Laurynas Grigelis	(Australia) Rameez Junaid (Slovakia) Igor Zelenay	6–4, 6–4
32.	Apr 2013	Italy F2	Futures	Clay	(Italy) Matteo Volante	(Italy) Daniele Giorgini (Italy) Francesco Picco	6–2, 6–3
33.	Sep 2013	Seville, Spain	Challenger	Clay	(France) Stéphane Robert	(Netherlands) Stephan Fransen (Netherlands) Wesley Koolhof	7–5, 7–5
34.	Dec 2013	Turkey F47	Futures	Hard	(Netherlands) Wesley Koolhof	(France) Julien Obry (France) Enzo Py	6–4, 4–6, [10–7]
35.	Jul 2014	Oberstaufen, Germany	Challenger	Clay	(Netherlands) Wesley Koolhof	(Moldova) Radu Albot (Poland) Mateusz Kowalczyk	7–6^{(9–7)}, 6–3
36.	Aug 2016	Fano, Italy	Challenger	Clay	(Italy) Riccardo Ghedin	(Austria) Lucas Miedler (Netherlands) Mark Vervoort	6–4, 6–4
37.	Nov 2017	Italy F36	Futures	Clay	(Italy) Andrea Vavassori	(Spain) Marc Fornell Mestres (Portugal) Fred Gil	3–6, 6–4, [10–8]
38.	Mar 2018	Greece F2	Futures	Hard	(Italy) Andrea Guerrieri	(United Kingdom) Jonathan Gray (United Kingdom) Luke Johnson	7–5, 6–3
39.	Jul 2021	Italy F6	Futures M25	Clay	(Italy) Julian Ocleppo	(Brazil) Matheus Pucinelli de Almeida (Brazil) Pedro Sakamoto	6–3, 6–2

== Doubles performance timeline ==
Key
W	F	SF	QF	#R	RR	Q#	DNQ	A	NH

(W) winner; (F) finalist; (SF) semifinalist; (QF) quarterfinalist; (#R) rounds 4, 3, 2, 1; (RR) round-robin stage; (Q#) qualification round; (DNQ) did not qualify; (A) absent; (NH) not held; (SR) strike rate (events won / competed); (W–L) win–loss record.
To avoid confusion and double counting, these charts are updated at the conclusion of a tournament or when the player's participation has ended.

Current through the 2018 Ecuador Open Quito.

Tournament	2003	2004	2005	2006	2007	2008	2009	2010	2011	2012	2013	2014	2015	2016	2017	2018	SR	W–L
Grand Slam tournaments
Australian Open	A	A	A	A	A	A	A	A	A	A	A	A	A	A	A	A	0 / 0	0–0
French Open	A	A	A	A	A	A	A	A	1R	A	A	A	A	A	A	A	0 / 1	0–1
Wimbledon	A	A	A	Q1	A	A	1R	Q1	1R	A	A	A	Q1	A	A	A	0 / 2	0–2
US Open	A	A	A	A	A	A	A	A	A	A	A	A	A	A	A		0 / 0	0–0
Career statistics
Titles / Finals	0 / 0	0 / 0	0 / 0	0 / 0	0 / 0	0 / 0	0 / 0	0 / 0	0 / 0	0 / 0	0 / 0	0 / 0	0 / 0	0 / 0	0 / 1	0 / 0	0 / 1	
Overall win–loss	0–0	0–0	0–1	0–2	0–0	1–2	0–3	1–3	0–5	1–2	0–0	0–0	0–2	0–1	3–2	2–1	8–24	
Year-end ranking	243	209	145	124	123	127	94	149	124	154	145	147	157	154	165		25%	
