= 2018 Istanbul Open =

- Date: 30 April–6 May 2018
- Edition: 4th
- Category: World Tour 250
- Draw: 28S / 16D
- Prize money: €426,145
- Surface: Clay / outdoor
- Location: Istanbul, Turkey
- Venue: Koza World of Sports Arena

Champions

Singles
- (Japan) Taro Daniel

Doubles
- (United Kingdom) Dominic Inglot / (Sweden) Robert Lindstedt
← 2017 ·	Istanbul Open

The 2018 Istanbul Open (also known as the TEB BNP Paribas Istanbul Open for sponsorship purposes) was a men's tennis tournament played on outdoor clay courts. It was the fourth edition of the Istanbul Open, and an ATP World Tour 250 event. It took place at the Koza World of Sports Arena in Istanbul, Turkey, from 30 April–6 May 2018.

== Singles main-draw entrants ==
=== Seeds ===
Country	Player	Rank^{1}	Seed
CRO	Marin Čilić	4	1
BIH	Damir Džumhur	32	2
ITA	Andreas Seppi	55	3
SLO	Aljaž Bedene	57	4
ITA	Paolo Lorenzi	66	5
SRB	Viktor Troicki	71	6
CZE	Jiří Veselý	78	7
GEO	Nikoloz Basilashvili	79	8

- Rankings are as of April 23, 2018.

=== Other entrants ===
The following players received wildcards into the main draw:

- (Turkey) Marsel İlhan
- (Turkey) Cem İlkel
- (Australia) Bernard Tomic

The following players received entry from the qualifying draw:

- (Spain) Daniel Gimeno Traver
- (Brazil) Thiago Monteiro
- (Argentina) Marco Trungelliti
- (Sweden) Elias Ymer

=== Withdrawals ===
Before the tournament

- (Croatia) Borna Ćorić → replaced by (Japan) Taro Daniel
- (Uruguay) Pablo Cuevas → replaced by (Serbia) Dušan Lajović
- (Ukraine) Alexandr Dolgopolov → replaced by (Russia) Mikhail Youzhny
- (Serbia) Filip Krajinović → replaced by (Tunisia) Malek Jaziri
- (Argentina) Horacio Zeballos → replaced by (Australia) John Millman

== Doubles main-draw entrants ==
=== Seeds ===
Country	Player	Country	Player	Rank^{1}	Seed
JPN	Ben McLachlan	USA	Nicholas Monroe	81	1
POL	Marcin Matkowski	IND	Divij Sharan	88	2
CHI	Hans Podlipnik Castillo	BLR	Andrei Vasilevski	104	3
GBR	Ken Skupski	GBR	Neal Skupski	110	4

- Rankings are as of April 23, 2018.

=== Other entrants ===
The following pairs received wildcards into the doubles main draw:

- (Turkey) Tuna Altuna / (Turkey) Anıl Yüksel
- (Turkey) Cem İlkel / (Australia) Bernard Tomic

=== Withdrawals ===
During the tournament

- (Serbia) Viktor Troicki

== Champions ==
=== Singles ===
- (Japan) Taro Daniel def. (Tunisia) Malek Jaziri, 7–6^{(7–4)}, 6–4

=== Doubles ===
- (United Kingdom) Dominic Inglot / (Sweden) Robert Lindstedt def. (Japan) Ben McLachlan / (United States) Nicholas Monroe, 3–6, 6–3, [10–8]
