= 2015 Istanbul Open =

- Date: 27 April – 3 May
- Edition: 1st
- Category: World Tour 250
- Draw: 28S / 16D
- Prize money: €439,405
- Surface: Clay / outdoor
- Location: Istanbul, Turkey
- Venue: Koza World of Sports Arena

Champions

Singles
- (Switzerland) Roger Federer

Doubles
- (Moldova) Radu Albot / (Serbia) Dušan Lajović
| Istanbul Open | · 2016 → |

The 2015 Istanbul Open (also known as the TEB BNP Paribas Istanbul Open for sponsorship purposes) was a men's tennis tournament played on outdoor clay courts. It was part of the 2015 ATP World Tour. It was the first edition of the Istanbul Open, and an ATP World Tour 250 event. It took place at the Koza World of Sports Arena in Istanbul, Turkey, from 27 April through 3 May 2015. First-seeded Roger Federer won the singles title.

== Finals ==
=== Singles ===
(Switzerland) Roger Federer defeated (Uruguay) Pablo Cuevas, 6–3, 7–6^{(13–11)}

- It was Federer's 3rd singles title of the year and the 85th of his career.

=== Doubles ===
(Moldova) Radu Albot / (Serbia) Dušan Lajović defeated (Sweden) Robert Lindstedt / (Austria) Jürgen Melzer, 6–4, 7–6^{(7–2)}

== Singles main draw entrants ==
=== Seeds ===
| Country | Player | Rank^{1} | Seed |
|---|---|---|---|
| SUI | Roger Federer | 2 | 1 |
| BUL | Grigor Dimitrov | 11 | 2 |
| URU | Pablo Cuevas | 23 | 3 |
| COL | Santiago Giraldo | 31 | 4 |
| AUT | Andreas Haider-Maurer | 47 | 5 |
| KAZ | Mikhail Kukushkin | 54 | 6 |
| RUS | Mikhail Youzhny | 57 | 7 |
| ARG | Diego Schwartzman | 61 | 8 |

- Rankings are as of April 20, 2015.

=== Other entrants ===
The following players received wildcards into the main draw:

- (Georgia (country)) Nikoloz Basilashvili
- (Turkey) Cem İlkel
- (Russia) Andrey Rublev

The following players received entry via the qualifying draw:

- (Russia) Teymuraz Gabashvili
- (Slovenia) Blaž Kavčič
- (Australia) Thanasi Kokkinakis
- (Kazakhstan) Aleksandr Nedovyesov

=== Withdrawals ===
Before the tournament

- (Italy) Paolo Lorenzi →replaced by Ivan Dodig
- (Argentina) Juan Mónaco →replaced by Daniel Gimeno-Traver

=== Retirements ===
- (Belgium) Steve Darcis

== Doubles main draw entrants ==
=== Seeds ===
| Country | Player | Country | Player | Rank^{1} | Seed |
|---|---|---|---|---|---|
| SWE | Robert Lindstedt | AUT | Jürgen Melzer | 69 | 1 |
| AUT | Oliver Marach | AUT | Philipp Oswald | 98 | 2 |
| AUS | Chris Guccione | BRA | André Sá | 100 | 3 |
| CRO | Mate Pavić | NZL | Michael Venus | 124 | 4 |

- Rankings are as of April 20, 2015.

=== Other entrants ===
The following pair received wildcards into the doubles main draw:

- (Turkey) Tuna Altuna / (Georgia (country)) Nikoloz Basilashvili
- (Turkey) Marsel İlhan / (Turkey) Cem İlkel

The following pair received entry as alternates:

- (Russia) Fedor Chervyakov / (Zimbabwe) Mark Fynn

=== Withdrawals ===
Before the tournament

- (Belgium) Steve Darcis
