= Fedor Chervyakov =

Russian tennis player (born 1993)

- Country (sports): Russia
- Residence: Izhevsk, Russia
- Born: 13 January 1993 (age 32) Izhevsk, Russia
- Height: 1.83 m (6 ft 0 in)
- Plays: Right-handed (two-handed backhand)
- Prize money: $22,411

Singles
- Career record: 0–0 (at ATP Tour level, Grand Slam level, and in Davis Cup)
- Career titles: 0
- Highest ranking: No. 781 (9 May 2016)

Doubles
- Career record: 0–1 (at ATP Tour level, Grand Slam level, and in Davis Cup)
- Career titles: 0
- Highest ranking: No. 1,114 (20 June 2016)

Fedor Chervyakov (born 13 January 1993) is a Russian tennis player.

Chervyakov has a career high ATP singles ranking of No. 781 achieved on 9 May 2016 and a career high ATP doubles ranking of No. 1,114 achieved on 20 June 2016.

Chervyakov made his ATP main draw debut at the 2015 Istanbul Open in the doubles draw partnering Mark Fynn.
