= Flavio Cipolla =

Italian tennis coach and former player (born 1983)

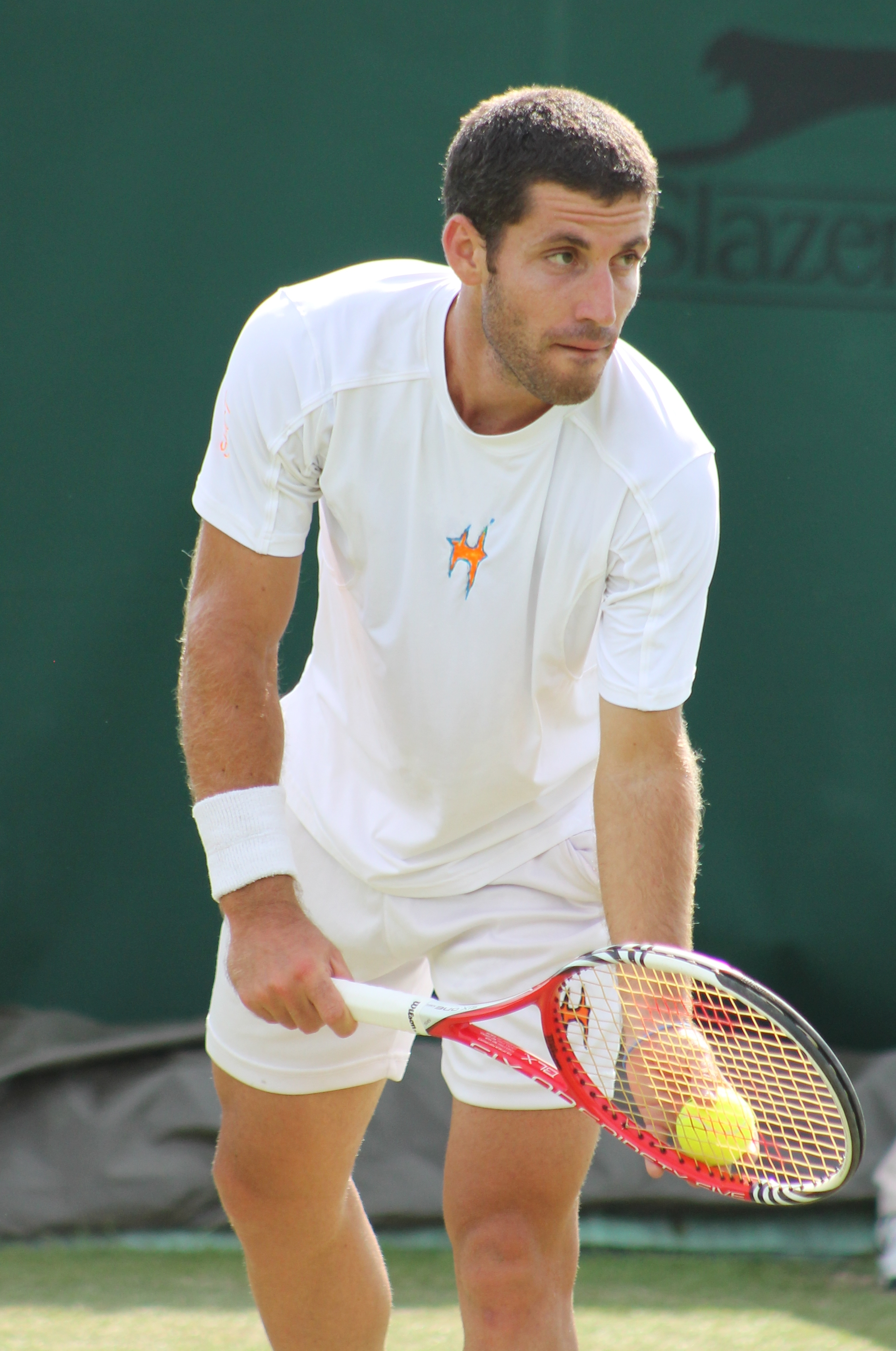
- Flavio Cipolla in 2014
- Country (sports): Italy
- Residence: Rome, Italy
- Born: 20 October 1983 (age 42) Rome, Italy
- Height: 1.73 m (5 ft 8 in)
- Turned pro: 2003
- Retired: 2017
- Plays: Right-handed (one-handed backhand)
- Prize money: US$1,632,927

Singles
- Career record: 36-66
- Career titles: 0
- Highest ranking: No. 70 (23 April 2012)

Grand Slam singles results
- Australian Open: 2R (2009, 2012)
- French Open: 2R (2007)
- Wimbledon: 1R (2011, 2012)
- US Open: 3R (2008)

Doubles
- Career record: 17-36
- Career titles: 1
- Highest ranking: No. 75 (14 July 2008)

Grand Slam doubles results
- Australian Open: 2R (2012, 2013)
- French Open: 1R (2012)
- Wimbledon: 2R (2008, 2017)
- US Open: 1R (2012)

Flavio Cipolla (born 20 October 1983) is an Italian tennis coach and former professional player. His career-high Association of Tennis Professionals (ATP) ranking was No. 70, achieved on 23 April 2012. His best major result was reaching the third round of the 2008 US Open.

== Career ==
=== 2008 ===
Cipolla began 2008 with a bang the first week in January, winning the singles and doubles titles of the Challenger in New Caledonia, to get his singles ranking to a career high of #116. He won 2 more Challenger doubles titles in February in Belgrade and in March in Italy to establish himself as a top-100 doubles player.

Cipolla got a chance to compete in a grand-slam tournament at the 2008 U.S. Open in the men's singles competition at Flushing Meadows. Despite losing in qualifying he, along with Rui Machado, were reinstated following the withdrawals of Mikhail Youzhny. Cipolla made the most of his opportunity and reached the third round. In the first round he beat Jan Hernych before defeating Yen-Hsun Lu of Chinese Taipei in the second round. In the third round he came up against world number 10 and tenth seed Stanislas Wawrinka of Switzerland. Cipolla took the match to 5 sets by taking a shock two set lead, however his Swiss opponent still had enough to come from behind and take the match, emerging victorious 5–7, 6–7, 6–4, 6–0, 6–4.

=== 2012 ===
In early 2012, Cipolla reached his first and only ATP semifinal in Casablanca, where he was defeated by Pablo Andujar. This lifted Cipolla to his highest career ranking of 70.

== Coaching ==
In February 2023, Cipolla began coaching top 10 Women's Tennis Association (WTA) player Daria Kasatkina, replacing her longtime coach Carlos Martinez. He was also the coach of Gianluca Mager until August 2025.

== ATP career finals ==
=== Doubles: 1 (1 title) ===
| Legend Grand Slam tournaments (0–0) ATP World Tour Finals (0–0) ATP World Tour Masters 1000 (0–0) ATP World Tour 500 Series (0–0) ATP World Tour 250 Series (1–0) | Titles by surface Hard (0–0) Clay (1–0) Grass (0–0) | Titles by setting Outdoor (1–0) Indoor (0–0) |

| Result | W–L | Date | Tournament | Tier | Surface | Partner | Opponents | Score |
|---|---|---|---|---|---|---|---|---|
| Win | 1–0 | May 2016 | Istanbul Open, Turkey | 250 Series | Clay | (Israel) Dudi Sela | (Argentina) Andrés Molteni (Argentina) Diego Schwartzman | 6–3, 5–7, [10–7] |

== Challenger career finals ==
=== Singles (5) ===
| Legend Grand Slam (0) Tennis Masters Cup (0) ATP Masters Series (0) ATP Tour (0) Challengers (5) | Titles by surface Hard (2) Grass (0) Clay (3) Carpet (0) |

| No. | Date | Tournament | Surface | Opponent | Score |
|---|---|---|---|---|---|
| 1. | 30 May 2006 | Turin, Italy | Clay | (Spain) Marcel Granollers | 6–3, 6–3 |
| 2. | 31 July 2007 | Trani, Italy | Clay | (Spain) Pablo Andújar | 4–6, 6–2, 6–4 |
| 3. | 4 September 2007 | Genoa, Italy | Clay | (Italy) Gianluca Naso | 6–2, 6–7^{(4–7)}, 7–5 |
| 4. | 1 January 2008 | Nouméa, New Caledonia | Hard | (Switzerland) Stéphane Bohli | 6–4, 7–5 |
| 5. | 6 February 2011 | Burnie, Australia | Hard | (Australia) Chris Guccione | W/O |

=== Doubles (17) ===
| Legend Grand Slam (0) Tennis Masters Cup (0) ATP Masters Series (0) ATP Tour (0) Challengers (17) | Titles by surface Hard (3) Grass (0) Clay (13) Carpet (1) |

| No. | Date | Tournament | Surface | Partnering | Opponents | Score |
|---|---|---|---|---|---|---|
| 1. | 4 July 2005 | Mantua, Italy | Clay | (Italy) Alessandro Motti | (Spain) Salvador Navarro (Spain) Óscar Serrano | 5–7, 6–3, 6–3 |
| 2. | 2 August 2005 | Saransk, Russia | Clay | (Germany) Simon Stadler | (Russia) Konstantin Kravchuk (Russia) Alexander Kudryavtsev | 7–6^{(7–2)}, 4–6, 7–6^{(7–3)} |
| 3. | 19 September 2005 | Banja Luka, Bosnia and Herzegovina | Clay | (Austria) Rainer Eitzinger | (Belgium) Jeroen Masson (Belgium) Stefan Wauters | 4–6, 6–3, 6–3 |
| 4. | 25 September 2006 | Bratislava, Slovak Republic | Clay | (Spain) Marcel Granollers | (Spain) David Marrero (Spain) Pablo Santos | 7–6^{(7–2)}, 6–4 |
| 5. | 9 October 2006 | Barcelona, Spain | Clay | (Germany) Tomas Behrend | (Spain) Pablo Andújar (Spain) Marcel Granollers | 6–3, 6–2 |
| 6. | 26 March 2007 | Naples, Italy | Clay | (Spain) Marcel Granollers | (Italy) Marco Crugnola (Italy) Alessio di Mauro | 6–4, 6–2 |
| 7. | 30 April 2007 | Rome, Italy | Clay | (Spain) Marcel Granollers | (Italy) Stefano Galvani (Italy) Manuel Jorquera | 3–6, 6–1, [11–9] |
| 8. | 1 January 2008 | Nouméa, New Caledonia | Hard | (Italy) Simone Vagnozzi | (Czech Republic) Jan Mertl (Austria) Martin Slanar | 6–4, 6–4 |
| 9. | 11 February 2008 | Belgrade, Serbia | Carpet | (Greece) Konstantinos Economidis | (Italy) Alessandro Motti (Slovakia) Filip Polášek | 4–6, 6–2, [10–8] |
| 10. | 24 March 2008 | Barletta, Italy | Clay | (Spain) Marcel Granollers | (Austria) Oliver Marach (Slovakia) Michal Mertiňák | 6–3, 2–6, [11–9] |
| 11. | 28 April 2008 | Rome, Italy | Clay | (Italy) Simone Vagnozzi | (Italy) Paolo Lorenzi (Italy) Giancarlo Petrazzuolo | 6–3, 6–3 |
| 12. | 27 May 2008 | Alessandria, Italy | Clay | (Italy) Simone Vagnozzi | (Netherlands) Matwé Middelkoop (Netherlands) Melle Van Gemerden | 3–6, 6–1, [10–4] |
| 13. | 13 October 2008 | Tashkent, Uzbekistan | Hard | (Czech Republic) Pavel Šnobel | (Russia) Michail Elgin (Russia) Alexandre Kudryavtsev | 6–3, 6–4 |
| 14. | 28 February 2010 | Meknes, Morocco | Clay | (Spain) Pablo Andújar | (Ukraine) Alexandr Dolgopolov (Ukraine) Artem Smirnov | 6–2, 6–2 |
| 15. | 12 September 2010 | Braşov, Romania | Clay | (Italy) Daniele Giorgini | (Moldova) Radu Albot (Moldova) Andrej Ciumac | 6–3, 6–4 |
| 16. | 19 September 2010 | Todi, Italy | Clay | (Italy) Alessio di Mauro | (Spain) Marcel Granollers (Spain) Gerard Granollers-Pujol | 6–1, 6–4 |
| 17. | 3 April 2011 | Barranquilla, Colombia | Hard | (Italy) Paolo Lorenzi | (Colombia) Alejandro Falla (Colombia) Eduardo Struvay | 6–3, 6–4 |

== Runners-up (22) ==
=== Singles (8) ===
| Legend Grand Slam (0) Tennis Masters Cup (0) ATP Masters Series (0) ATP Tour (0) Challengers (8) | Finals by surface Hard (3) Grass (0) Clay (5) Carpet (0) |

| No. | Date | Tournament | Surface | Opponent | Score |
|---|---|---|---|---|---|
| 1. | 29 August 2005 | Freudenstadt, Germany | Clay | (Argentina) Sergio Roitman | 7–5, 6–4 |
| 2. | 6 September 2005 | Genoa, Italy | Clay | (Italy) Potito Starace | 6–3, 7–6^{(7–3)} |
| 3. | 3 April 2006 | Monza, Italy | Clay | (France) Nicolas Devilder | 6–2, 7–5 |
| 4. | 28 July 2008 | Tampere, Finland | Clay | (France) Mathieu Montcourt | 6–2, 6–2 |
| 5. | 9 January 2010 | Nouméa, New Caledonia | Hard | (Germany) Florian Mayer | 6–3, 6–0 |
| 6. | 4 Juny 2011 | Prostějov, Czech Republic | Clay | (Kazakhstan) Yuri Schukin | 6–4, 4–6, 6–0 |
| 7. | 13 November 2011 | Loughborough, UK | Hard | (Germany) Tobias Kamke | 2–6, 5–7 |
| 8. | 9 September 2012 | Saint-Rémy-de-Provence, France | Hard | (France) Josselin Ouanna | 4–6, 5–7 |

=== Doubles (15) ===
| Legend Grand Slam (0) Tennis Masters Cup (0) ATP Masters Series (0) ATP Tour (0) Challengers (15) | Finals by surface Hard (3) Grass (0) Clay (12) Carpet (0) |

| No. | Date | Tournament | Surface | Partnering | Opponents | Score |
|---|---|---|---|---|---|---|
| 1. | 29 June 2004 | Mantua, Italy | Clay | (Italy) Alessandro Motti | (Italy) Daniele Bracciali (Italy) Giorgio Galimberti | 6–0, 6–4 |
| 2. | 25 July 2005 | Togliatti, Russia | Hard | (Italy) Massimo Ocera | (United States) Scott Lipsky (New Zealand) Mark Nielsen | 6–2, 6–3 |
| 3. | 12 September 2005 | Seville, Spain | Clay | (Italy) Alessandro Motti | (Brazil) Marcos Daniel (Spain) Fernando Vicente | 6–2, 6–7^{(1–7)}, 7–5 |
| 4. | 3 October 2005 | Rome, Italy | Clay | (Italy) Alessandro Motti | (Greece) Konstantinos Economidis (Greece) Vasilis Mazarakis | 6–4, 7–6^{(7–4)} |
| 5. | 20 March 2006 | Barletta, Italy | Clay | (Italy) Alessandro Motti | (Spain) Santiago Ventura (Spain) Fernando Vicente | 7–6^{(7–2)}, 4–6, [10–8] |
| 6. | 15 May 2006 | San Remo, Italy | Clay | (Italy) Francesco Piccari | (France) Julien Benneteau (France) Nicolas Mahut | 6–4, 7–6^{(8–6)} |
| 7. | 30 May 2006 | Turin, Italy | Clay | (Italy) Leonardo Azzaro | (Spain) Marcel Granollers (Spain) Marc López | 6–4, 6–3 |
| 8. | 11 June 2007 | Košice, Slovak Republic | Clay | (Italy) Leonardo Azzaro | (Slovakia) Filip Polášek (Czech Republic) Lukáš Rosol | 6–1, 7–6^{(7–5)} |
| 9. | 23 July 2007 | Poznań, Poland | Clay | (Slovakia) Ivo Klec | (Spain) Marc López (Spain) Santiago Ventura | 6–2, 5–7, [10–3] |
| 10. | 27 August 2007 | Como, Italy | Clay | (Italy) Maro Pedrini | (Argentina) Máximo González (Italy) Simone Vagnozzi | 7–6^{(7–5)}, 6–4 |
| 11. | 4 September 2007 | Genoa, Italy | Clay | (Italy) Simone Bolelli | (Italy) Daniele Giorgini (Italy) Simone Vagnozzi | 6–3, 6–1 |
| 12. | 11 October 2009 | Tarragona, Spain | Clay | (Italy) Alessandro Motti | (Poland) Tomasz Bednarek (Poland) Mateusz Kowalczyk | 6–1, 6–1 |
| 13. | 10 January 2010 | Nouméa, New Caledonia | Hard | (Italy) Simone Vagnozzi | (France) Nicolas Devilder (France) Édouard Roger-Vasselin | 5–7, 6–2, [10–8] |
| 14. | 9 January 2011 | Nouméa, New Caledonia | Hard | (Italy) Simone Vagnozzi | (Germany) Dominik Meffert (Denmark) Frederik Nielsen | 7–6^{(7–4)}, 5–7, [10–5] |
| 15. | 24 September 2011 | İzmir, Turkey | Hard | (Italy) Thomas Fabbiano | (United States) Travis Rettenmaier (Germany) Simon Stadler | 6–0, 6–2 |

== Performance timelines ==
Key
| W | F | SF | QF | #R | RR | Q# | DNQ | A | NH |

(W) winner; (F) finalist; (SF) semifinalist; (QF) quarterfinalist; (#R) rounds 4, 3, 2, 1; (RR) round-robin stage; (Q#) qualification round; (DNQ) did not qualify; (A) absent; (NH) not held; (SR) strike rate (events won / competed); (W–L) win–loss record.

=== Singles ===
| Tournament | 2007 | 2008 | 2009 | 2010 | 2011 | 2012 | 2013 | W–L |
|---|---|---|---|---|---|---|---|---|
Grand Slam tournaments
| Australian Open | | | 2R | | 1R | 2R | 1R | 2–4 |
| French Open | 2R | | | | | 1R | | 1–2 |
| Wimbledon | | | | | 1R | 1R | | 0–2 |
| US Open | | 3R | 1R | | 2R | 2R | | 4–4 |
| Win–loss | 1–1 | 2–1 | 1–2 | 0–0 | 1–3 | 2–4 | 0–1 | 7–12 |

=== Doubles ===
Current till 2013 Australian Open.

| Tournament | 2008 | 2010 | 2011 | 2012 | 2013 | 2017 | W–L |
|---|---|---|---|---|---|---|---|
Grand Slam tournaments
| Australian Open | A | A | A | 2R | 2R | A | 2–2 |
| French Open | A | A | A | 1R | A | A | 0–1 |
| Wimbledon | 2R | A | 1R | 1R | Q1 | 2R | 2–4 |
| US Open | A | A | A | 1R | A | A | 0–1 |
| Win–loss | 1–1 | 0–0 | 0–1 | 1–4 | 1–1 | 1–1 | 4–8 |
