= Istanbul Open =

Defunct tennis tournament
- Founded: 2015
- Abolished: 2018
- Editions: 4
- Location: Istanbul; Turkey
- Venue: Koza World of Sports
- Category: ATP World Tour 250 series
- Surface: Clay / outdoor
- Draw: 28S / 16D / 32Q
- Prize money: €439,405
- Website: istanbulopen.org

The Istanbul Open, known as the TEB BNP Paribas Istanbul Open (for sponsorship purposes), was a men's tennis event on the ATP Tour held in the Turkish city of Istanbul. From 2015 to 2018, it was part of the ATP 250 Series. The tournament was played on outdoor clay courts. It was the first ATP World Tour event held in Turkey.

The inaugural tournament was held from 27 April to 3 May 2015 at the "Koza World of Sports" facility, which is promoted as the largest tennis academy in the world. The center court featured a retractable roof and provided seating for 7,500 people. Two other clay show courts raised available seating to 9,500. The tournament was discontinued in 2018.

== Finals ==
=== Singles ===
Year	Champions	Runners-up	Score
2015	(Switzerland) Roger Federer	(Uruguay) Pablo Cuevas	6–3, 7–6^{(13–11)}
2016	(Argentina) Diego Schwartzman	(Bulgaria) Grigor Dimitrov	6–7^{(5–7)}, 7–6^{(7–4)}, 6–0
2017	(Croatia) Marin Čilić	(Canada) Milos Raonic	7–6^{(7–3)}, 6–3
2018	(Japan) Taro Daniel	(Tunisia) Malek Jaziri	7–6^{(7–4)}, 6–4

=== Doubles ===
Year	Champions	Runners-up	Score
2015	(Moldova) Radu Albot (Serbia) Dušan Lajović	(Sweden) Robert Lindstedt (Austria) Jürgen Melzer	6–4, 7–6^{(7–2)}
2016	(Italy) Flavio Cipolla (Israel) Dudi Sela	(Argentina) Andrés Molteni (Argentina) Diego Schwartzman	6–3, 5–7, [10–7]
2017	(Czech Republic) Roman Jebavý (Czech Republic) Jiří Veselý	(Turkey) Tuna Altuna (Italy) Alessandro Motti	6–0, 6–0
2018	(United Kingdom) Dominic Inglot (Sweden) Robert Lindstedt	(Japan) Ben McLachlan (United States) Nicholas Monroe	3–6, 6–3, [10–8]

== See also ==
- İstanbul Cup – women's tournament
