= Diego Schwartzman =

Argentine tennis player (born 1992)

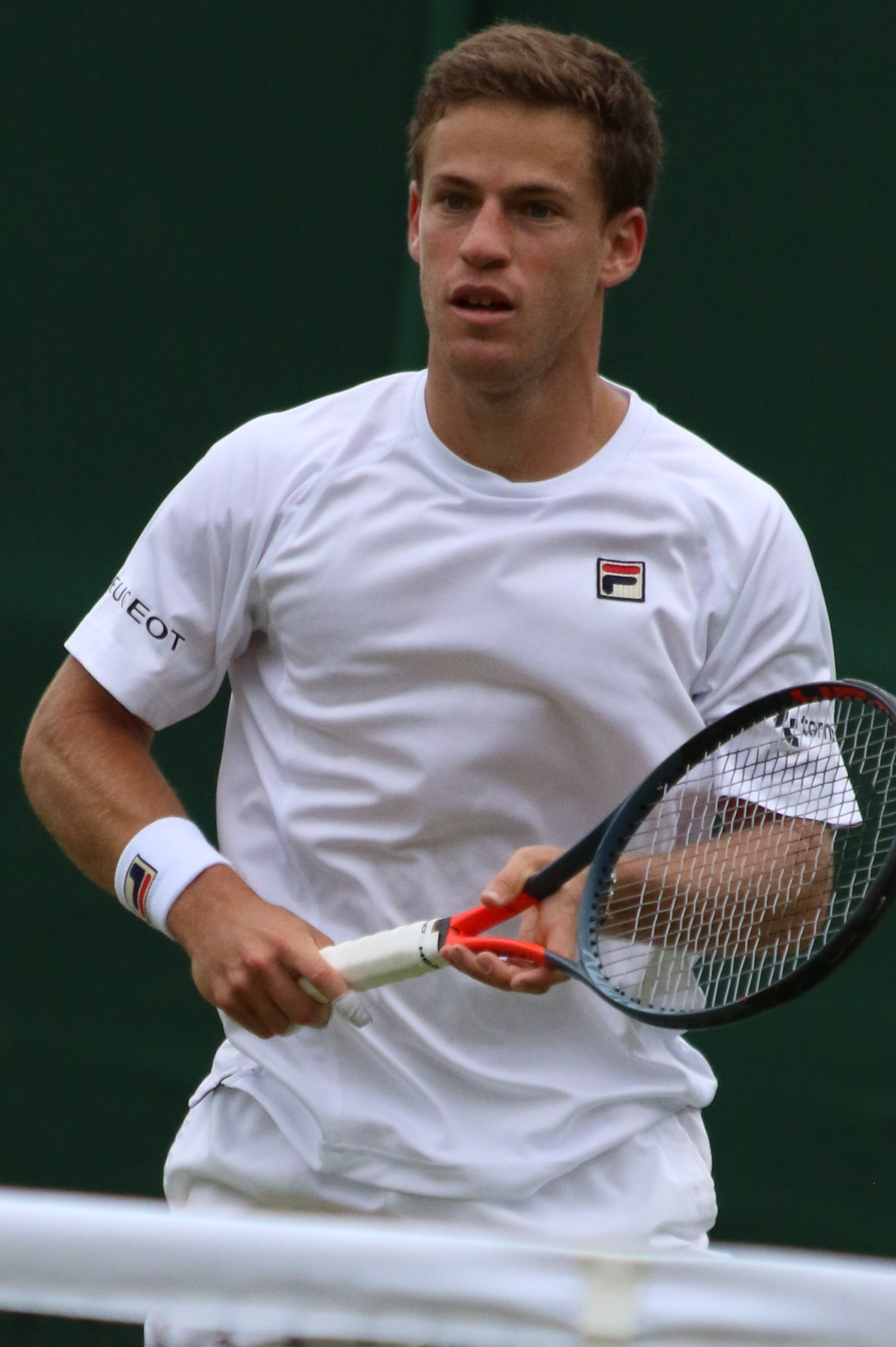
- Schwartzman at the 2019 Wimbledon Championships
- Full name: Diego Sebastián Schwartzman
- Country (sports): Argentina
- Residence: Buenos Aires, Argentina
- Born: 16 August 1992 (age 34) Buenos Aires, Argentina
- Height: 1.70 m (5 ft 7 in)
- Turned pro: 2010
- Retired: 13 February 2025
- Plays: Right-handed (two-handed backhand)
- Coach: Bruno Tiberti; Leo Olguin
- Prize money: US $14,079,005

Singles
- Career record: 251–226
- Career titles: 4
- Highest ranking: No. 8 (12 October 2020)

Grand Slam singles results
- Australian Open: 4R (2018, 2020)
- French Open: SF (2020)
- Wimbledon: 3R (2019, 2021)
- US Open: QF (2017, 2019)

Other tournaments
- Tour Finals: RR (2020)
- Olympic Games: 3R (2021)

Doubles
- Career record: 68–111
- Career titles: 0
- Highest ranking: No. 39 (6 January 2020)

Grand Slam doubles results
- Australian Open: 2R (2015)
- French Open: SF (2019)
- Wimbledon: 2R (2016)
- US Open: 2R (2015, 2016)

Team competitions
- Davis Cup: SF (2015)
- Last updated on: 20 August 2024.

Diego Sebastián Schwartzman (Spanish pronunciation: [ˈdjeɣo seβasˈtjan ˈʃwaɾtsman], German: [ˈʃvaʁtsman]; born 16 August 1992) is an Argentine former professional tennis player. He won four ATP Tour singles titles and reached his career-high singles ranking of world No. 8 in October 2020. As a clay court specialist, his best results were on this surface. He was noted for his high-quality return game.

When he reached the quarterfinals of the 2017 US Open, the 170-centimetre (5 ft 7 in) Schwartzman was the shortest major quarterfinalist since the equally-tall Jaime Yzaga at the 1994 US Open. Schwartzman said: "It's not just for the big guys here."

Schwartzman reached his first Masters final at the 2020 Italian Open, defeating defending champion and world No. 2, Rafael Nadal, en route. He lost to Novak Djokovic in the final. A month later, at the 2020 French Open, he defeated world No. 3 Dominic Thiem to reach his first major semifinal, the shortest man to do so since the 5-foot-6-inch (168 cm) American Harold Solomon at the 1980 French Open.

== Early life ==
Schwartzman is of Ashkenazi Jewish descent, and is the son of Ricardo Sebastián and Silvana Schwartzman. He was born and resides in Buenos Aires, Argentina. During the Holocaust, his Polish-Jewish maternal great-grandfather was put on a train to a Nazi concentration camp. The coupling that connected two of the train's cars broke, allowing his great-grandfather and others inside one car to escape. His great-grandfather brought his family by boat from Germany to Argentina. His father's ancestors emigrated from Russia to Argentina by boat.

Growing up, Schwartzman played tennis at Club Náutico Hacoaj, a Jewish-Argentine sports club in Buenos Aires that was established by and for Jews who were not allowed to join other sports clubs in the city in the early 20th century. At junior tournaments, Schwartzman often faced antisemitic catcalls. On the ATP Tour, he has endured less antisemitism, but at the 2017 US Open, a spectator shouted, "Jewish people are not allowed here" in the direction of Schwartzman.

Schwartzman's family owned a successful clothing and jewelry company. However, around the time Schwartzman was born, the family became quite poor because of the Argentine great depression. To afford the expenses of tennis, Schwartzman and his mother would sell bracelets at his junior tennis tournaments.

Schwartzman has two brothers (one a software developer, the other a travel agent) and a sister (a lawyer). Schwartzman's nickname is El Peque (an abbreviation of the word "pequeño", meaning "Shorty" in Spanish).

== Career ==
=== Junior career ===
Schwartzman did not have an illustrious junior career and peaked at an ITF junior ranking of No. 217. At age 13, he began traveling across South America to play in junior tournaments. He saw success at that level and began receiving funding to pay for travel, equipment, and coaching expenses. The only junior Grand Slam he played in was the 2010 US Open, where he lost in the first round of qualifying.

=== 2010–13 ===
In 2010, at the age of 17, he won the Bolivia F3 Futures (CL), and in 2011 he won the Chile F14 Futures (CL). In 2012, Schwartzman won titles at the Peru F2 Futures (CL), Argentina F11 Futures (CL), Argentina F14 Futures (CL), Argentina F20 Futures (CL), Argentina F21 Futures (CL), Argentina F22 Futures (CL), and Buenos Aires Challenger (CL). At the 2013 Australian Open, he lost in the final round of qualifying.

=== 2014: Four Challenger titles & ATP Challenger Tour Finals champion ===
Schwartzman made his first appearance in the main draw of a Grand Slam event at the French Open; he came through qualifying before making it to the second round, where he lost to Roger Federer. He lost in the first round of the US Open to Novak Djokovic.

He won four titles in the ATP Challenger Tour—at Aix-en-Provence, Prague, Campinas, and San Juan. In the Challenger Tour Finals, he won over João Souza, Simone Bolelli, and Guilherme Clezar to claim the title. At the end of the season, Schwartzman was ranked No. 61 worldwide.

=== 2015: Davis Cup semifinals ===
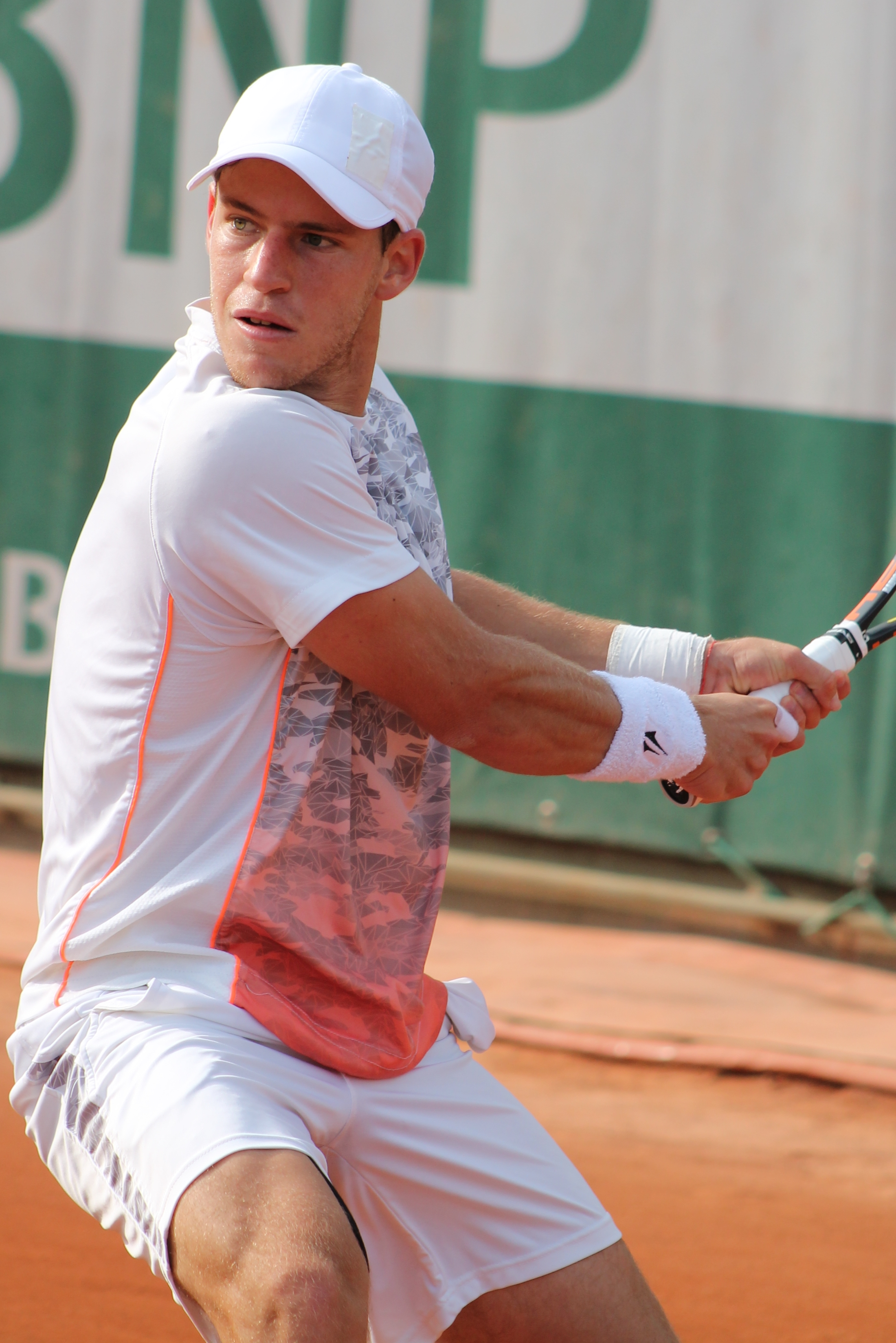
Diego Schwartzman, 2015

Schwartzman's best result of the season came at the Istanbul Open, where he reached the semifinals, beating former top-ten player Jürgen Melzer along the way. He faced tennis legend Roger Federer in the semifinals. Schwartzman won the first set decisively before ultimately falling 7–5 in the final set. He was also part of the Argentine Davis Cup Team, which reached the semifinals in 2015.

=== 2016: First ATP title ===
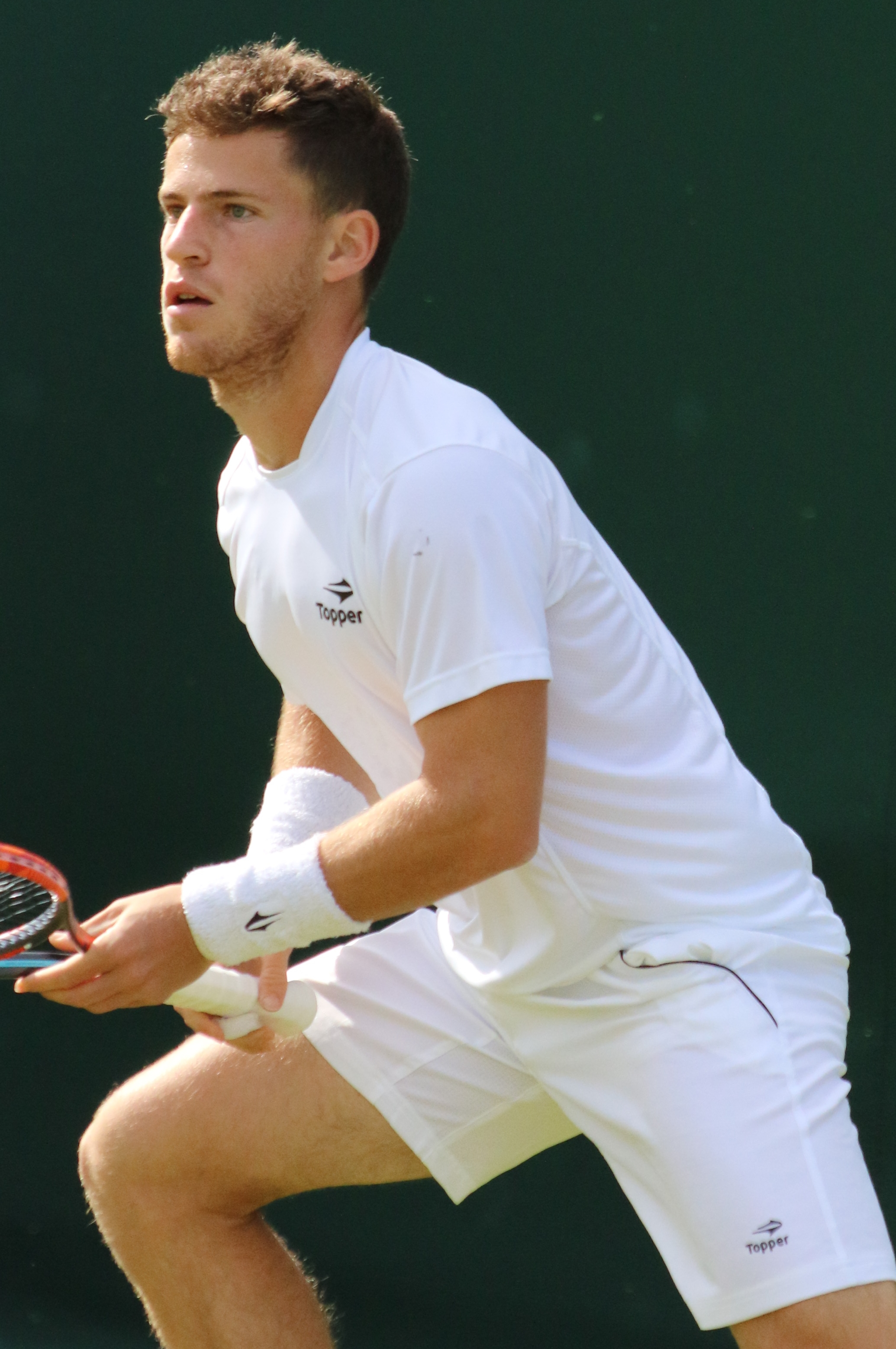
Diego Schwartzman, 2016

Schwartzman won his first-ever singles title at the Istanbul Open—an outdoor 250 clay court event. He impressively defeated established top player Grigor Dimitrov in the final, coming back to win 6–0 in the final set after losing the first set in a tie-break. Later, Dimitrov apologized for his behavior during the match after he smashed three rackets, which ultimately led to a warning, a point penalty, and another point penalty. The second and final point penalty came with Dimitrov down 5–0 and gave the game, set, and match to Schwartzman.

In October, Schwartzman reached his second final at the 250 level in Antwerp. He lost to Richard Gasquet, 6–7, 1–6. In 2016, he led all ATP players in the percentage of break points converted, at 46.6%.

=== 2017: US Open quarterfinalist ===
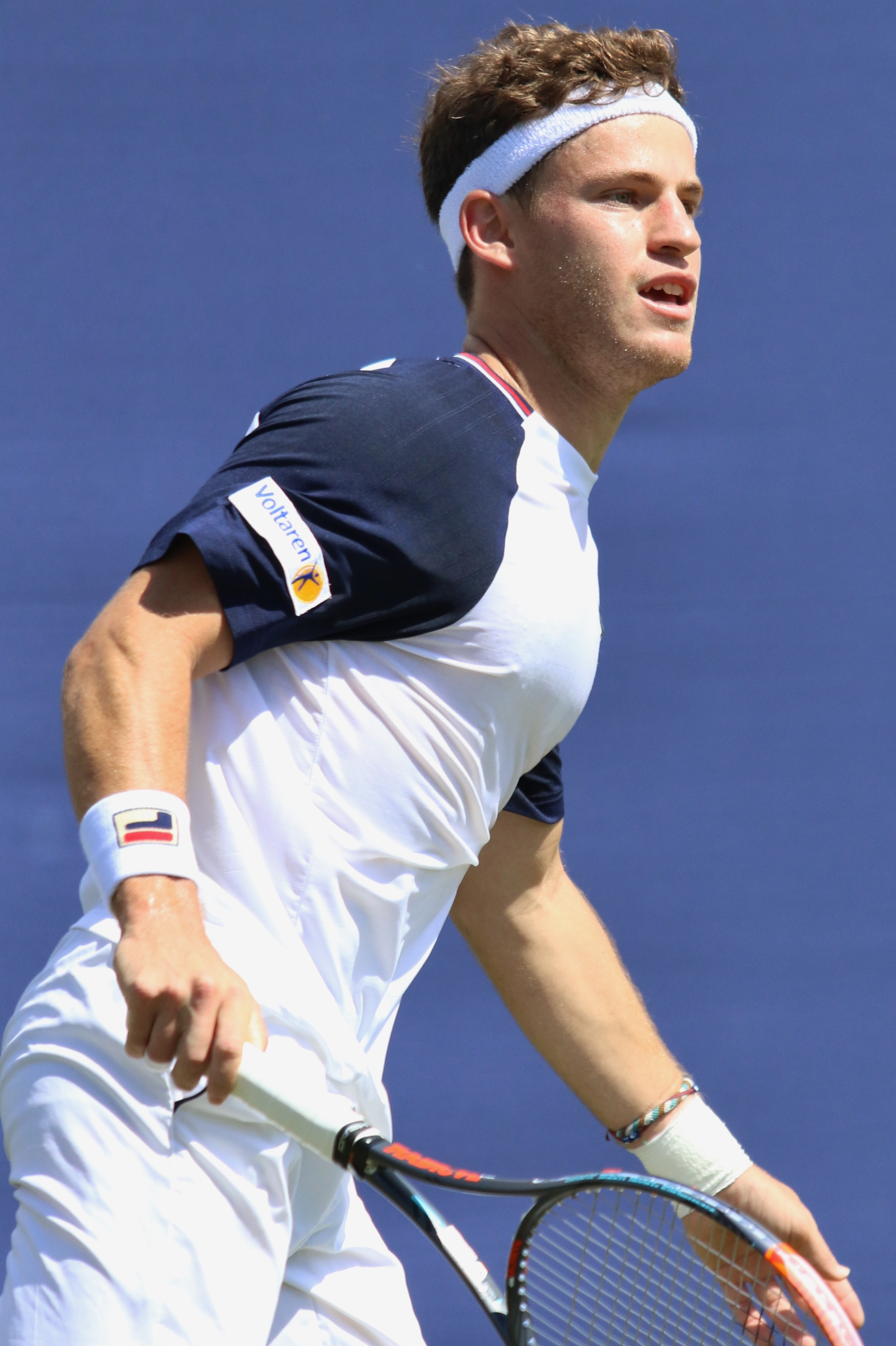
Diego Schwartzman, 2017

Schwartzman reached the third round at the French Open, where he faced Novak Djokovic. He had a 2–1 set lead, but eventually, Djokovic won in five sets.

In the Canadian Open, the 25-year-old saved four match points to pull off a remarkable 4–6, 7–6, 7–5 upset of No. 3 seed Dominic Thiem, his first-ever win over a top-10 player. As of mid-August 2017, Schwartzman was leading the ATP Tour in winning percentage in return games at 36 percent (192/532), with Nadal in second place and Djokovic in fourth place.

On 1 September 2017, Schwartzman upset world No. 7 and fifth seed, Marin Čilić in the third round of the US Open to equal the biggest win of his career. On 3 September 2017, he beat world No. 20 and 16th seed, Lucas Pouille, in the fourth round to reach his first career major quarterfinal. In the quarterfinals, he lost to Pablo Carreño Busta.

Schwartzman's 2017 season proved to be the best of his career to that point. He finished the year ranked world No. 25; in addition to making his first major quarterfinal, he also made two quarterfinals at the Masters 1000 level. He won 39 singles matches and earned $1,536,000 over the course of the season, easily besting his previous records of 17 match wins and $441,000 in the 2016 season. In 2017, he led all ATP players in the percentage of second serve return points won (56.1%) and percentage of return games won (34.8%) while coming in third behind Andy Murray and Rafael Nadal in the percentage of first serve return points won (34.3%). Finally, he scored his first win over a top-10 player, and then just two weeks later, he racked up a second top-10 win.

=== 2018: Second ATP title & Grand Slam quarterfinal, top 15 ===
In his first 17 Grand Slam tournaments, Schwartzman had only reached the third round once. However, at the 2018 Australian Open, he advanced to the fourth round, where he played world No. 1, Rafael Nadal. For the first time in his career, Schwartzman made the second week at a major for the second consecutive time, following his quarterfinal showing at the 2017 US Open. Despite going into the match with an 0-3 head-to-head record, 0–7 in sets, Schwartzman took the second-set tiebreak 7–4 before eventually going down in four sets. By virtue of his performance, he reached a new career-high singles ranking of No. 24 on 29 January 2018.

He then went on to capture the title at the Rio Open, an ATP 500-level clay tournament, defeating Fernando Verdasco 6–2, 6–3. The Rio Open marked the biggest title of Schwartzman's career thus far. He reached a new career-high singles ranking of No. 15 on 2 April 2018 and was the first Jewish male player to break into the singles top 20 since Nicolás Massú was ninth in 2004. At the French Open, Schwartzman made it into his second Grand Slam quarterfinal. He didn't drop a set on his run to the fourth round, where he faced sixth seed and world No. 7, Kevin Anderson, and won in just under four hours after coming back from two sets to love down for the first time in his career. Questioned by reporters as to how he defeated the 6’ 8″ Anderson, he replied: "Did you read David and Goliath?" In the quarterfinals, he took the first set from Rafael Nadal, but it started raining, and the match was postponed to the next day where Nadal won the following three sets. His quarterfinal showing marked his third consecutive Grand Slam tournament, where he made it to the second week of competition.

Schwartzman participated in only two grass court events in 2018; they included the Eastbourne International and Wimbledon. Although Schwartzman was the No. 1 seed, he fell in three sets in the first round to Mirza Bašić. At Wimbledon, Schwartzman scored his first career grass-court win by defeating Mirza Bašić in straight sets before falling in the second round to Jiří Veselý.

Schwartzman reached the quarterfinals of the 2018 German Open but fell to eventual finalist Leonardo Mayer in three sets. In 2018 he was second to Nadal among all ATP players in the percentage of second-serve return points won (55.8%) and percentage of return games won (30.7%).

=== 2019: Third ATP title, Masters singles & Major doubles semifinals ===
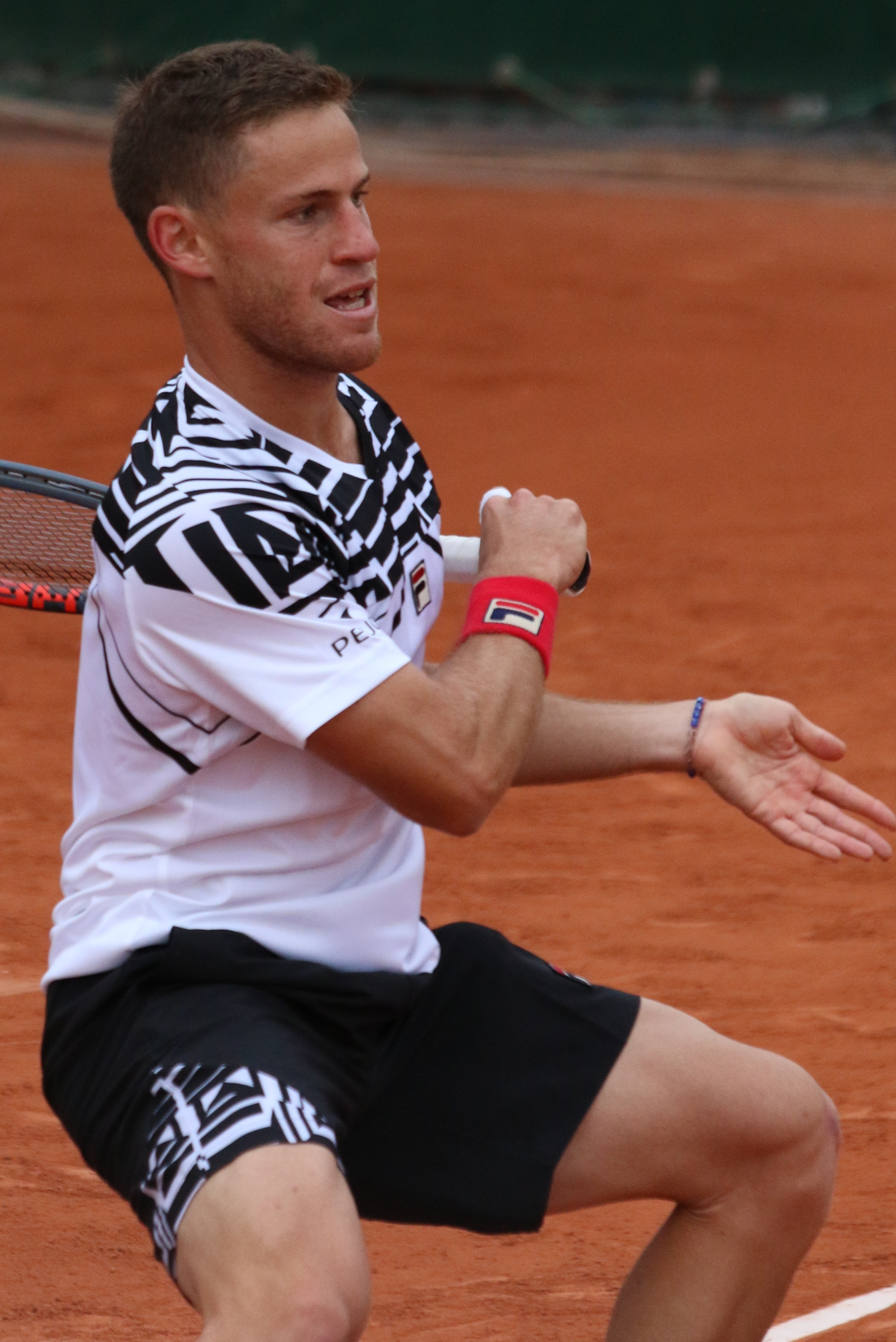
Schwartzman playing in the French Open, 2019

At the Australian Open, Schwartzman defeated Rudolf Molleker in four sets and American Denis Kudla in a five-set thriller. He was knocked out in the third round by former Wimbledon finalist, Tomáš Berdych.

Schwartzman then competed in the Córdoba Open, making the quarterfinals. He went on to make the finals at the Argentina Open, an ATP 250-level clay tournament. On his way to the finals, Schwartzman defeated world No. 8, Dominic Thiem, 2–6, 6–4, 7–6 but he lost in straight sets to Marco Cecchinato in the finals. Schwartzman was unable to defend his title at the Rio Open, retiring in the second set with a right leg injury in the first round.

At the 2019 Mutua Madrid Open as an unseeded pair, Schwartzman reached his first Masters 1000 final in doubles partnering Dominic Thiem, where they lost to Jean-Julien Rojer and Horia Tecău. He defeated world No. 6, Kei Nishikori, 6–4, 6–2 in the quarterfinals of the Italian Open before being defeated by Djokovic in three sets.

At the 2019 French Open partnering compatriot Guido Pella also as an unseeded pair, he reached his first Grand Slam doubles semifinal losing to eventual champions the German pair of Kevin Krawietz and Andreas Mies. In singles, he lost to another fellow Argentine Leonardo Mayer in the second round.

Schwartzman then captured the title at the 2019 Los Cabos Open, defeating Taylor Fritz in the final, 7–6^{(8–6)}, 6–3. It marked his first-ever title at a hard-court tournament and third ATP title.

At the US Open, Schwartzman upset world No. 6, Alexander Zverev, in four sets in the fourth round, for his sixth career victory against a top-10 opponent. In the quarterfinals, he fell to eventual champion Rafael Nadal.

In Vienna at the Erste Bank Open in October, Schwartzman beat world No. 9, Karen Khachanov of Russia, in straight sets and world No. 14, Gaël Monfils. Dominic Thiem defeated him in the final.

In 2019, as he had done in 2017, Schwartzman led all ATP players in the percentage of second-serve return points won (56.1%). For the years 2015–19, of all match-winning tennis players he led in winning percentage against second serves (60%), and against first serves (37.9%). Career-wise, he was fourth among active players in return games won (31.1%), behind only Nadal (33.5%), Djokovic (32%), and Andy Murray (31.7%).

=== 2020: First Masters final, French Open semifinal, top 10 & ATP Finals debuts ===
At the Australian Open, Schwartzman reached the fourth round without dropping a set but was defeated by the eventual champion, Novak Djokovic. He was seeded ninth in the men's singles draw at the US Open but lost in a first-round five-setter to the unseeded British player Cameron Norrie.

At the Italian Open, Schwartzman defeated nine-time champion and world No. 2, Rafael Nadal, in straight sets in the quarterfinals, his first victory against Nadal. Schwartzman said: "It was my best match ever." He went on to defeat Denis Shapovalov to reach the final against Djokovic, his first ATP Masters 1000 final, becoming the shortest player to reach a Masters final. There, he lost in two tight sets despite being a double break up in the first set.

At the French Open, Schwartzman defeated world No. 3 Dominic Thiem in the quarterfinals in a five-set match that took five hours and eight minutes to complete. It was his ninth career win over a top-10 player. In a rematch of the Italian Open quarterfinals, he was defeated by Nadal in straight sets in Schwartzman's first major semifinals, where he became the shortest man to reach a Grand Slam singles semi-final since 168-centimetre (5 ft 6 in) Harold Solomon at the 1980 French Open.

The following week Schwartzman was ranked No. 8 in the world, his first time ranked in the top 10 singles players. He was the shortest player in the top 10 since Harold Solomon in 1981.

His first tournament as a top 10 player was at the 2020 Bett1Hulks Championship. He defeated Alejandro Davidovich Fokina in the quarterfinals and Félix Auger-Aliassime in the semifinals but was defeated in the final by Alexander Zverev. At the Paris Masters, Schwartzman beat Richard Gasquet and Alejandro Davidovich Fokina before losing to Daniil Medvedev in the quarterfinals.

Schwartzman qualified for the 2020 ATP Finals as one of the top eight players. In his debut appearance, he was eliminated in the round-robin stage with a straight-set loss to Novak Djokovic and a three-set loss to Alexander Zverev.

As a result of his successful season and reaching the ATP top 10, Schwartzman was awarded the Olimpia Award, which is given to the most important Argentinian sportsperson of the year.

=== 2021: Fourth ATP title, French Open quarterfinal ===
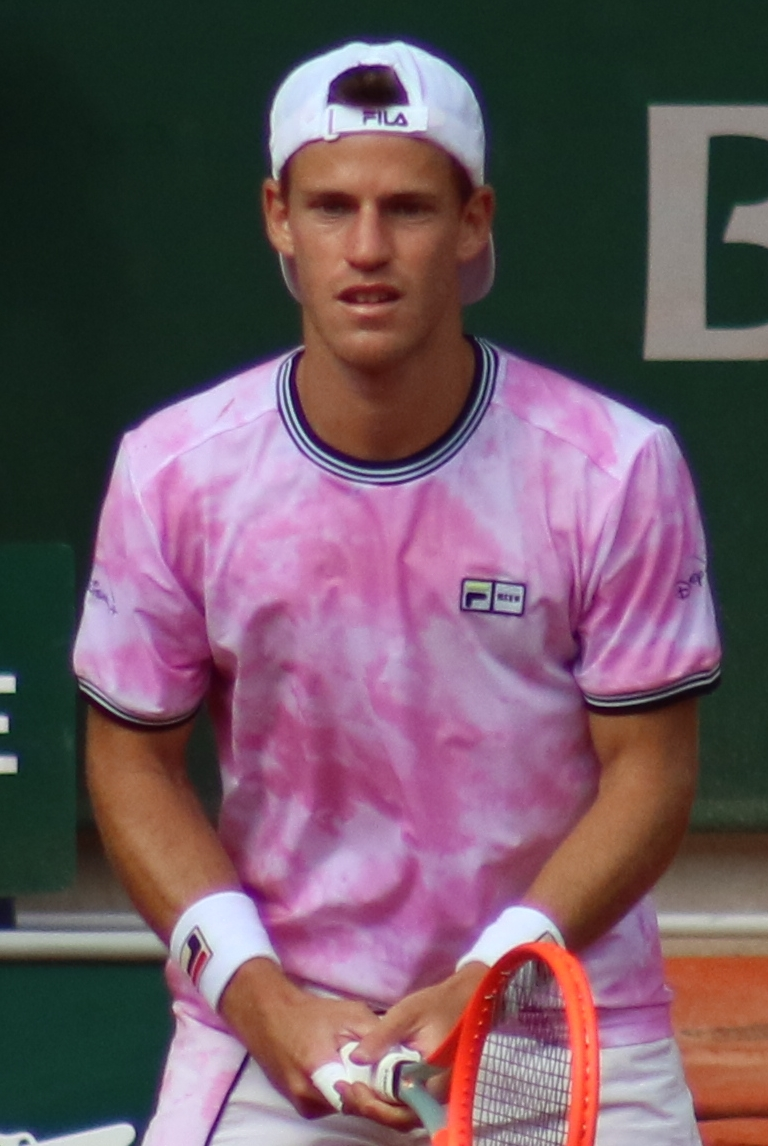
Schwartzman, 2021

Schwartzman reached the third round of the Australian Open but was defeated by qualifier Aslan Karatsev in a rare matchup between two Jewish tennis players. Karatsev went on to reach the semifinals of the tournament. He was the top seed at the Córdoba Open, but was defeated in the quarterfinals by Albert Ramos Viñolas in three sets.

In his hometown tournament, the Argentina Open, Schwartzman won his first tournament since 2019. In the semifinals, he defeated Miomir Kecmanović and in the final Francisco Cerúndolo. He did not drop a set in the entire tournament.

Seeded 10th at the 2021 French Open, Schwartzman reached the quarterfinals without dropping a set but was defeated by Rafael Nadal in a thrilling four-set match. Schwartzman was the eight seed in the 2020 Olympics, which were held in 2021 because of the COVID-19 pandemic. He easily defeated Juan Pablo Varillas and Tomáš Macháč but lost in 3 sets in an upset to Karen Khachanov.

At the 2021 US Open, Schwartzman reached the fourth round defeating Ričardas Berankis, Kevin Anderson, and Alex Molčan without dropping a set. However, in the fourth round, he was upset by qualifier Botic van de Zandschulp in a five-set, four-hour, and 19-minute match.

At the 2021 Indian Wells, Schwartzman reached the quarterfinals, beating Maxime Cressy, Dan Evans and Casper Ruud before being defeated by Cameron Norrie in straight sets. A week later, he reached the final at the European Open, highlighted by a win over former No. 1 Andy Murray in the first career matchup between the two. Schwartzman was defeated in the championship match by Jannik Sinner. He continued his success in the fall swing of the season by reaching the quarterfinals at the 2021 Erste Bank Open with wins over Fabio Fognini and Gaël Monfils.

=== 2022: Two Golden Swing finals, Masters singles quarterfinal & doubles final ===
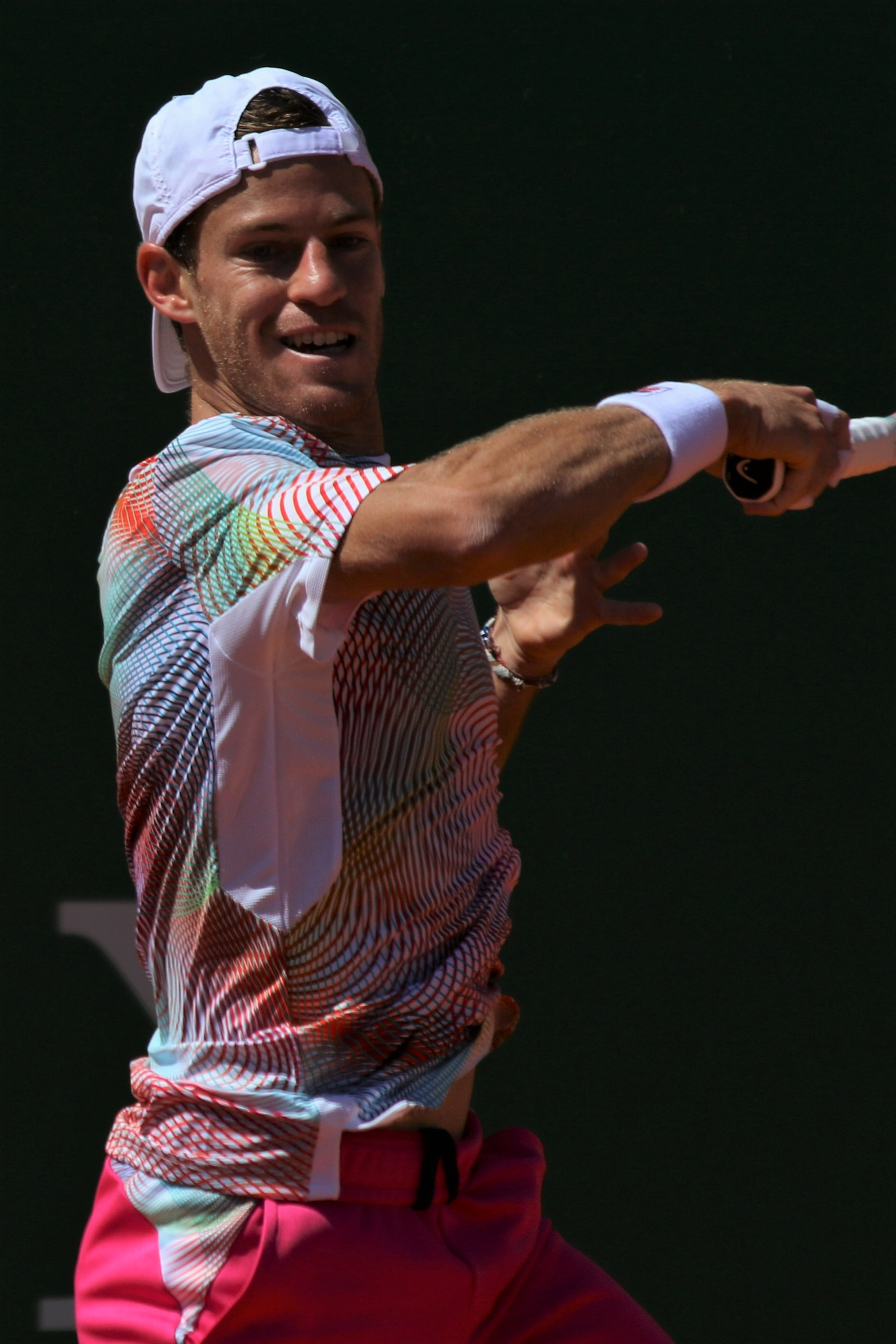
Schwartzman, 2022

Schwartzman started the 2022 season strong with a convincing 6–1, 6–2 win over Nikoloz Basilashvili and a three-set win over world No. 4 Stefanos Tsitsipas at the 2022 ATP Cup. In a shocking upset, Schwartzman lost in the second round of the Australian Open to Australian Christopher O'Connell, who was ranked No. 175 in the world at the time.

Schwartzman saw early success in the season during the Golden Swing, a series of four tennis tournaments in South America. Entering the 2022 Córdoba Open as the top seed, Schwartzman was favored to win the tournament held in his home country. Schwartzman defeated Juan Pablo Ficovich and Daniel Elahi Galán to reach the semifinals, where he lost to Alejandro Tabilo. The following week Schwartzman entered the Argentina Open as the tournament's defending champion and defeated Jaume Munar, Francisco Cerúndolo and Lorenzo Sonego to reach the final. He lost in three sets to the tournament's top seed and world No. 8 Casper Ruud in the final. The next week, Schwartzman continued his success in South America by reaching the final at the Rio Open an ATP 500 tournament. However, he lost in the championship match to Carlos Alcaraz in straight sets.

At the 2022 Monte-Carlo Masters, an ATP 1000 level tournament, which was Schwartzman's first tournament of the spring clay season, he reached the quarterfinals. His run to the quarterfinals included wins over Karen Khachanov, Márton Fucsovics, and Lorenzo Musetti. In a tight three-set match, Schwartzman lost to Tsitsipas in the quarterfinals. Schwartzman continued his winning ways during the European clay swing of the season by reaching the quarterfinals of the 2022 Barcelona Open, an ATP 500 event, where he defeated world No. 9 Félix Auger-Aliassime in three sets before falling to Pablo Carreño Busta in the semifinals. At the 2022 Italian Open, Schwartzman partnered with John Isner as an unseeded pair and defeated Andrey Golubev and Máximo González in the semifinal. They were defeated in the final by the Croatian duo of Nikola Mektić and Mate Pavić.

Schwartzman entered the 2022 French Open as the No. 15 seed. He defeated Andrey Kuznetsov, Jaume Munar, and No. 18 seed Grigor Dimitrov to reach the fourth round. There he was defeated by the top seed and defending champion Novak Djokovic.

Schwartzman, who has struggled throughout his career on the grass courts, lost in the second round of the 2022 Eastbourne International and the first round at the 2022 Queen's Club Championships. At the 2022 Wimbledon Championships, where he was the No. 12 seed, Schwartzman defeated Stefan Kozlov but lost in the second round to Liam Broady in five sets.

Schwartzman reached the quarterfinals in the summer clay season at the Swedish Open. During the US Open Series, Schwartzman defeated Alejandro Davidovich Fokina and reached the second round of the National Bank Open. The following week, at the Cincinnati Open, he defeated Alex Molčan and Aslan Karatsev before falling to Stefanos Tsitsipas in the third round. At the 2022 US Open, Schwartzman was seeded No.14 and defeated Jack Sock and Alexei Popyrin to reach the third round but was defeated by Frances Tiafoe.

=== 2023: Out of top 100, 250th win ===
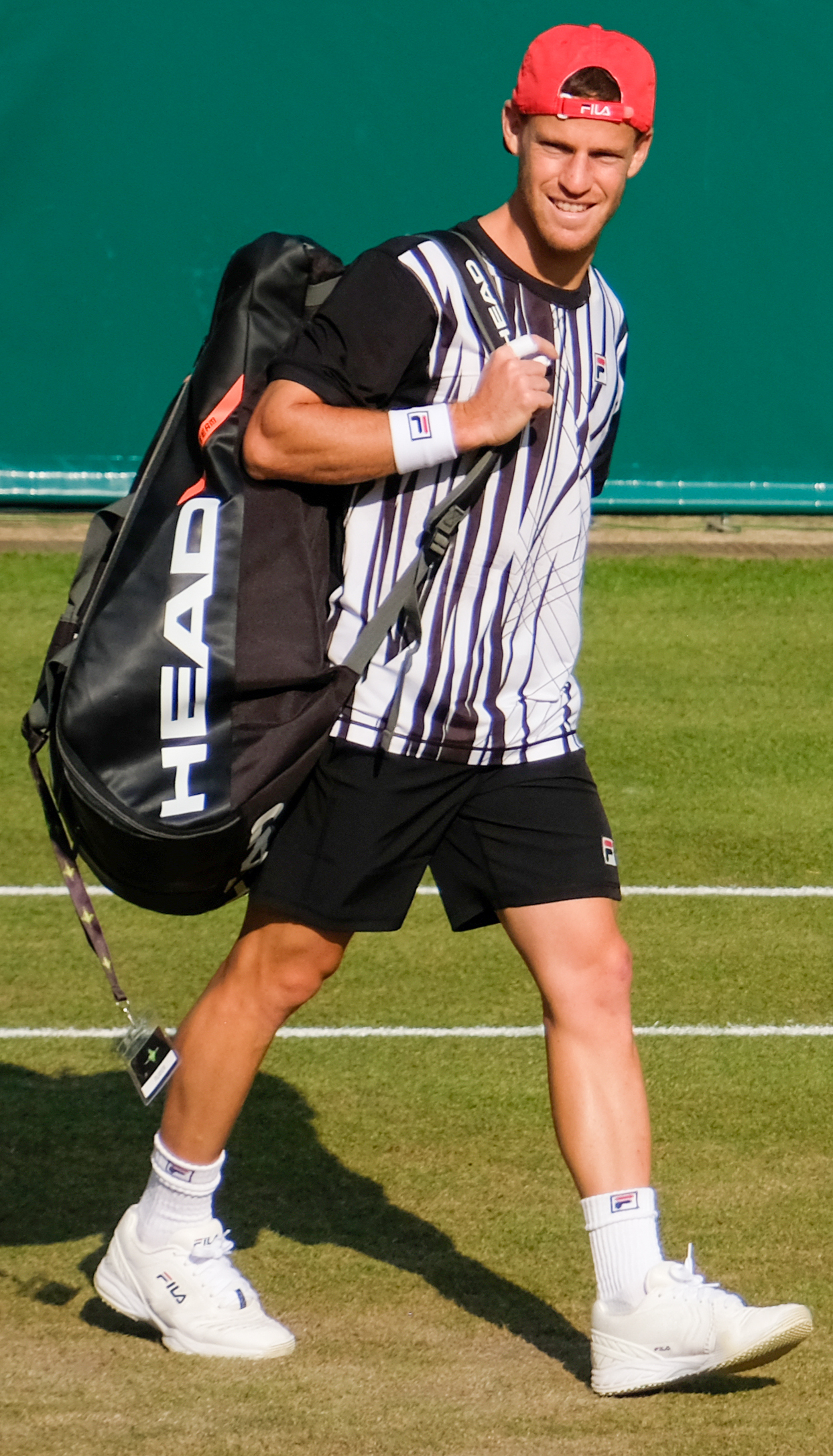
Schwartzman at the Boodles Exhibition Challenge, 2023

Schwartzman struggled in the beginning of the 2023 season and he fell out of the top-30 ATP singles rankings for the first time since 2017. He dealt with a leg injury in the beginning of the year, which forced him to retire after one set in the 2023 ASB Classic. He lost in straight sets in the second round of the 2023 Australian Open to J. J. Wolf. He also failed to win a match during the Golden Swing, which has historically been one of his most successful portions of the season.

He showed improvement in the North American hard court portion of the season reaching the second round of the Indian Wells Masters and the third round of the Miami Open. He lost in the first round at the 2023 Italian Open to Matteo Arnaldi. Schwartzman also reached the second round in Monte Carlo and the third at the 2023 French Open upsetting 32nd seed Bernabé Zapata Miralles and Nuno Borges before losing to fifth seed Stefanos Tsitsipas in straight sets. Despite these results, he dropped out of the top 100 at world No. 106 on 12 June 2023.

Schwartzman reached the second round of the 2023 Wimbledon Championships by defeating Miomir Kecmanović in straight sets. He lost in the next round to Jannik Sinner in straight sets.

At the 2023 Cincinnati Open, Schwartzman lost in the second round of the qualifying draw. This marked the end of 52 straight main draw appearances at the ATP Masters 1000 level for Schwartzman. Schwartzman lost in the first round of the 2023 US Open to Arthur Rinderknech.

At the 2023 Rolex Shanghai Masters he reached the fourth round defeating seventh seed Taylor Fritz winning three matches in a row for the first time in the season and since Roland Garros in May 2022. His good form continued at the 2023 Japan Open Tennis Championships where he recorded his 250th career win over compatriot Francisco Cerúndolo. He became the tenth Argentinian man with 250 wins in the Open Era.

=== 2024–25: 11th US Open appearance, retirement ===
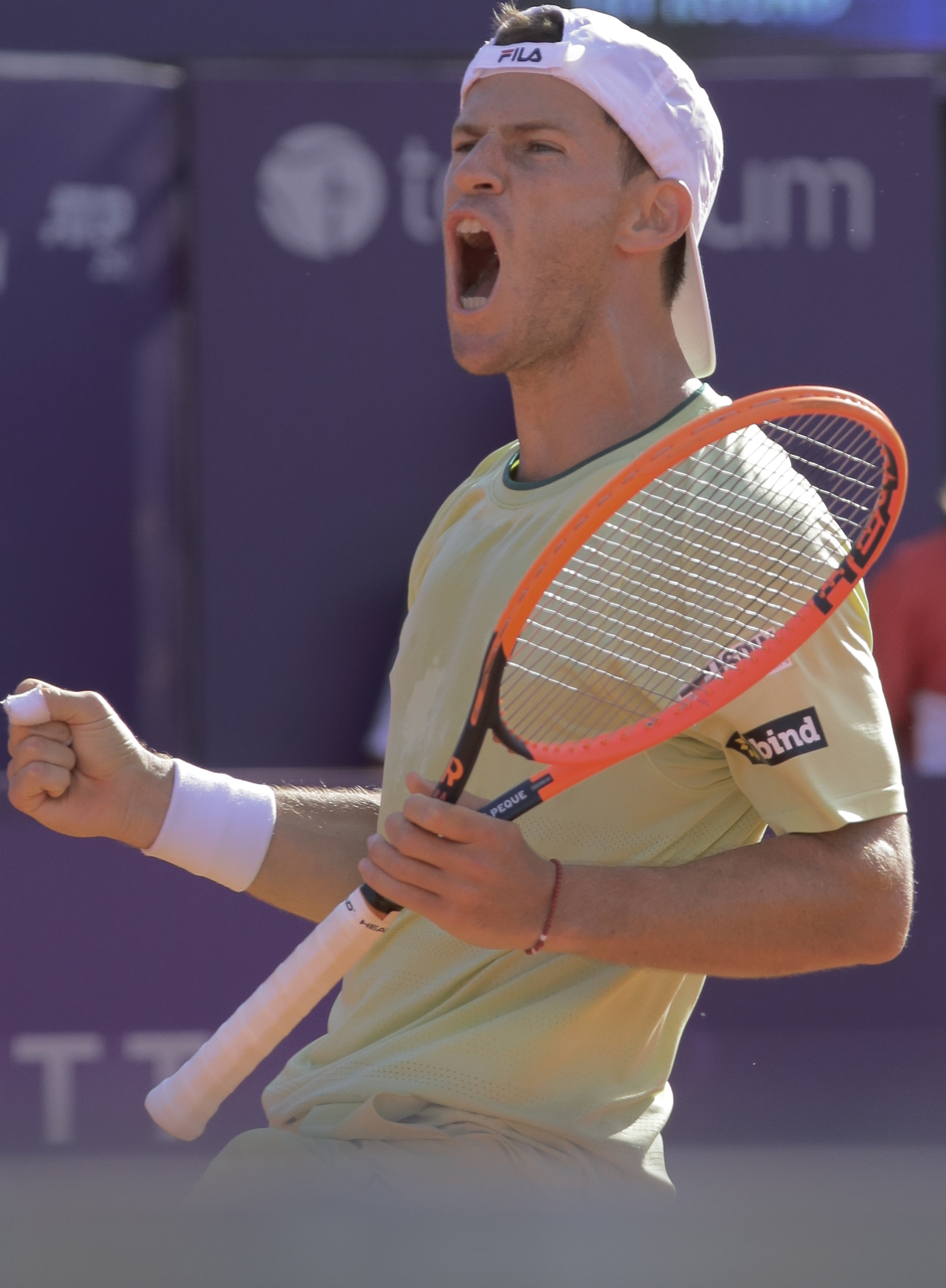
Schwartzman playing in his last career match, 2025

Schwartzman participated in the Golden Swing, similar to his previous season, he was a direct entry at the 2024 Córdoba Open, and received wildcards for the 2024 Argentina Open, the 2024 Los Cabos Open and the ATP 500 2024 Abierto Mexicano Telcel but lost in all four tournaments in the first round. After early setbacks, he managed to qualify for the main draw at the 2024 Miami Open, and at the Italian Open.

In May 2024, Schwartzman announced he would retire from professional tennis after the Argentina Open in 2025. He played his last match at Roland Garros in qualifying, losing in the second round to Quentin Halys.

Ranked No. 246, he qualified for the 2024 US Open, making his 11th appearance at this Major, defeating Andrea Pellegrino, top qualifying seed and compatriot Thiago Agustín Tirante and top Lithuanian player Vilius Gaubas.

Schwartzman played his final professional tournament at the Argentina Open in February 2025. He defeated seventh seed Nicolás Jarry in three sets before losing in the second round to Pedro Martínez.

After retiring from tennis, Schwartzman began playing soccer for Barkojba, a Jewish sports club in Buenos Aires.

== Playing style ==
Schwartzman tended to play as a baseline player with solid groundstrokes on both wings and the ability to counterpunch and go on the offensive. He was known for clean hitting off both his forehand and backhand and his ability to take the ball on the rise and hit it with depth and pace. Analysts consider that he played well on the defensive due to his speed and ability to hit winners from defensive positions far off of the court. His speed also allowed him to retrieve drop shots and hit passing shots easily. He also possessed solid volleys and preferred the drop volley, though they were not a major weapon in his game.

Schwartzman had a consistent, though not outstanding, serve and arguably played better on the return than on serve. In 2017, he statistically led the ATP on return games, and second-serve points won.

Schwartzman's speed and powerful baseline game resulted in most of his success coming on clay rather than hardcourts or grass. However, towards the middle years of his career, he attempted to add more variety to his game, resulting in breakthroughs, particularly on grass, scoring his first-ever win on grass only in 2018 at Wimbledon.

== Career statistics ==
=== Grand Slam performance timeline ===
Key
| W | F | SF | QF | #R | RR | Q# | DNQ | A | NH |

(W) winner; (F) finalist; (SF) semifinalist; (QF) quarterfinalist; (#R) rounds 4, 3, 2, 1; (RR) round-robin stage; (Q#) qualification round; (DNQ) did not qualify; (A) absent; (NH) not held; (SR) strike rate (events won / competed); (W–L) win–loss record.
To avoid confusion and double counting, these charts are updated at the conclusion of a tournament or when the player's participation has ended.

| Tournament | 2013 | 2014 | 2015 | 2016 | 2017 | 2018 | 2019 | 2020 | 2021 | 2022 | 2023 | 2024 | SR | W–L | Win% |
|---|---|---|---|---|---|---|---|---|---|---|---|---|---|---|---|
Grand Slam tournaments
| Australian Open | Q3 | Q1 | 1R | 1R | 2R | 4R | 3R | 4R | 3R | 2R | 2R | Q1 | 0 / 9 | 13–9 | 59% |
| French Open | Q2 | 2R | 2R | 1R | 3R | QF | 2R | SF | QF | 4R | 3R | Q2 | 0 / 10 | 23–10 | 70% |
| Wimbledon | A | A | 1R | 1R | 1R | 2R | 3R | NH | 3R | 2R | 2R | Q1 | 0 / 8 | 7–8 | 47% |
| US Open | Q3 | 1R | 2R | 1R | QF | 3R | QF | 1R | 4R | 3R | 1R | 1R | 0 / 11 | 16–11 | 59% |
| Win–loss | 0–0 | 1–2 | 2–4 | 0–4 | 7–4 | 10–4 | 9–4 | 8–3 | 11–4 | 7–4 | 4–4 | 0–1 | 0 / 38 | 59–38 | 61% |
Year End Championship
| ATP Finals | Did not qualify | | | | | | | RR | Did not qualify | | | | 0 / 1 | 0–3 | 0% |

== Personal life ==
Schwartzman married Eugenia De Martino, a fashion model from Argentina, in October 2025. He has two Rhodesian Ridgebacks called Bob and Ziggy. He appeared on Masterchef Celebrity Argentina in Autumn 2025.

== See also ==
- List of notable Jewish tennis players

Awards
| Preceded by Luis Scola | Olimpia de Oro; 2020 | Succeeded by Lionel Messi |
