= 2012 UniCredit Czech Open – Singles =

Singles
- 2012 UniCredit Czech Open

Final
- Champion: (Germany) Florian Mayer
- Runner-up: (Czech Republic) Jan Hájek
- Score: 7–6^{(7–1)}, 3–6, 7–6^{(7–3)}

Events
Singles	Doubles
← 2011 ·	UniCredit Czech Open	· 2013 →

Yuri Schukin was the defending champion but decided to compete in the Fürth Challenger instead.
Florian Mayer won the title by defeating Jan Hájek 7–6^{(7–1)}, 3–6, 7–6^{(7–3)} in the final.

== Seeds ==
1. (Spain) Fernando Verdasco (first round)
2. (Czech Republic) Radek Štěpánek (semifinals)
3. (Germany) Florian Mayer (champion)
4. (Kazakhstan) Mikhail Kukushkin (first round)
5. (Belgium) Steve Darcis (second round)
6. (Spain) Albert Montañés (quarterfinals)
7. (Spain) Guillermo García-López (second round)
8. (Spain) Rubén Ramírez Hidalgo (first round)

== Draw ==
=== Key ===
- Q = Qualifier
- WC = Wild card
- LL = Lucky loser
- Alt = Alternate
- SE = Special exempt
- PR = Protected ranking
- ITF = ITF entry
- JE = Junior exempt
- w/o = Walkover
- r = Retired
- d = Defaulted
- SR = Special ranking

=== Finals ===
Semifinals
(Poland) Jerzy Janowicz	5	5
3/WC	(Germany) Florian Mayer	7	7
(Czech Republic) Jan Hájek	6	6
2/WC	(Czech Republic) Radek Štěpánek	1	2

Final
3/WC	(Germany) Florian Mayer	7^{7}	3	7^{7}
(Czech Republic) Jan Hájek	6^{1}	6	6^{3}

=== Top half ===
First round
1/WC	(Spain) F Verdasco	4	7^{7}	4
Q	(Slovakia) M Semjan	6	6^{5}	6
(Czech Republic) J Mertl	6	5	6
(Brazil) J Souza	4	7	4
(Poland) J Janowicz	6	6
(Chinese Taipei) J Wang	4	1
(Spain) D Muñoz de la Nava	1	2
5	(Belgium) S Darcis	6	6
3/WC	(Germany) F Mayer	6	6
(Czech Republic) L Rosol	4	2
(United States) W Odesnik	6	6
Q	(Belarus) U Ignatik	2	1
(France) G Rufin	4	6	1^{r}
(Chinese Taipei) T-h Yang	6	1	4
Q	(France) A Michon	4	2
6	(Spain) A Montañés	6	6

Second round
Q	(Slovakia) M Semjan	7	1	6
(Czech Republic) J Mertl	5	6	3
(Poland) J Janowicz	6	5	6
5	(Belgium) S Darcis	4	7	4
3/WC	(Germany) F Mayer	6	6
(United States) W Odesnik	4	2
(Chinese Taipei) T-h Yang	1	3
6	(Spain) A Montañés	6	6

Quarterfinals
Q	(Slovakia) M Semjan	2	7^{7}	2
(Poland) J Janowicz	6	6^{4}	6
3/WC	(Germany) F Mayer	7^{7}	4	6
6	(Spain) A Montañés	6^{2}	6	4

Semifinals
(Poland) J Janowicz	5	5
3/WC	(Germany) F Mayer	7	7

=== Bottom half ===
First round
8	(Spain) R Ramírez Hidalgo	4	4
(Czech Republic) J Hájek	6	6
Alt	(Slovakia) K Čapkovič	6	6
(Italy) F Volandri	4	2
(Russia) T Gabashvili	7	6
(Spain) A Menéndez-Maceiras	5	2
Alt	(Dominican Republic) V Estrella	2	6	7
4	(Kazakhstan) M Kukushkin	6	4	5
7	(Spain) G García-López	7^{7}	6
WC	(Czech Republic) J Veselý	6	3
Alt	(Slovakia) P Červenák	6	3	6
(Turkey) M İlhan	3	6	3
Q	(Czech Republic) J Pospíšil	4	6	6^{2}
(Italy) F Cipolla	6	3	7^{7}
(Thailand) D Udomchoke	0	0
2/WC	(Czech Republic) R Štěpánek	6	6

Second round
(Czech Republic) J Hájek	7	6
Alt	(Slovakia) K Čapkovič	5	3
(Russia) T Gabashvili	7	6
Alt	(Dominican Republic) V Estrella	5	1
7	(Spain) G García-López	7^{7}	4	2
Alt	(Slovakia) P Červenák	6^{4}	6	6
(Italy) F Cipolla	4	4
2/WC	(Czech Republic) R Štěpánek	6	6

Quarterfinals
(Czech Republic) J Hájek	6	6
(Russia) T Gabashvili	1	3
Alt	(Slovakia) P Červenák	6	3	0
2/WC	(Czech Republic) R Štěpánek	2	6	6

Semifinals
(Czech Republic) J Hájek	6	6
2/WC	(Czech Republic) R Štěpánek	2	1
