= 2016 UniCredit Czech Open – Doubles =

Doubles
- 2016 UniCredit Czech Open

Final
- Champions: (Belarus) Aliaksandr Bury (Slovakia) Igor Zelenay
- Runners-up: (Chile) Julio Peralta (Chile) Hans Podlipnik
- Score: 6–4, 6–4

Events
Singles	Doubles
← 2015 ·	UniCredit Czech Open	· 2017 →

Julian Knowle and Philipp Oswald were the defending champions, but Oswald chose not to compete this year.
Knowle instead competed with Marcelo Demoliner. Demoliner and Knowle lost in the first round to Facundo Bagnis and Sergio Galdós.

Aliaksandr Bury and Igor Zelenay won the title, defeating Julio Peralta and Hans Podlipnik in the final, 6–4, 6–4.

== Seeds ==
1. (United States) Nicholas Monroe / (New Zealand) Artem Sitak (first round)
2. (Brazil) Marcelo Demoliner / (Austria) Julian Knowle (first round)
3. (Chile) Julio Peralta / (Chile) Hans Podlipnik (final)
4. (Belarus) Aliaksandr Bury / (Slovakia) Igor Zelenay (champions)

== Draw ==
=== Key ===
- Q = Qualifier
- WC = Wild card
- LL = Lucky loser
- Alt = Alternate
- ITF = ITF entry
- PR = Protected ranking
- SR = Special ranking
- SE = Special exempt
- JE = Junior exempt
- JR = Junior Accelerator Programme entrant
- CO = College Accelerator Programme entrant
- NG = Next Gen Accelerator Program entrant
- w/o = Walkover
- r = Retired
- d = Defaulted

First round
1	(United States) N Monroe (New Zealand) A Sitak	3	2
(Brazil) R Dutra Silva (Argentina) A Molteni	6	6
(Croatia) N Mektić (Croatia) A Šančić	2	6	[10]
WC	(Czech Republic) Z Kolář (Czech Republic) M Vocel	6	3	[8]
3	(Chile) J Peralta (Chile) H Podlipnik	7	6
(Czech Republic) R Jebavý (Czech Republic) J Veselý	5	4
WC	(Czech Republic) Michal Konečný (Czech Republic) V Šafránek	0	6	[10]
(Bosnia and Herzegovina) D Džumhur (Serbia) P Krstin	6	2	[5]
(Spain) Í Cervantes (Netherlands) M Vervoort	2	6	[11]
(Czech Republic) A Pavlásek (Sweden) E Ymer	6	4	[9]
(Russia) M Elgin (Poland) M Kowalczyk	5	2
4	(Belarus) A Bury (Slovakia) I Zelenay	7	6
WC	(Czech Republic) D Kellovský (Czech Republic) J Pospíšil	4	6	[4]
(El Salvador) M Arévalo (United States) J Cerretani	6	3	[10]
(Argentina) F Bagnis (Peru) S Galdós	4	6	[10]
2	(Brazil) M Demoliner (Austria) J Knowle	6	4	[7]

Quarterfinals
(Brazil) R Dutra Silva (Argentina) A Molteni	4	6	[10]
(Croatia) N Mektić (Croatia) A Šančić	6	3	[12]
3	(Chile) J Peralta (Chile) H Podlipnik	6	6
WC	(Czech Republic) M Konečný (Czech Republic) V Šafránek	2	2
(Spain) Í Cervantes (Netherlands) M Vervoort	1	4
4	(Belarus) A Bury (Slovakia) I Zelenay	6	6
(El Salvador) M Arévalo (United States) J Cerretani	6	6
(Argentina) F Bagnis (Peru) S Galdós	3	3

Semifinals
(Croatia) N Mektić (Croatia) A Šančić	4	6^{7}
3	(Chile) J Peralta (Chile) H Podlipnik	6	7^{9}
4	(Belarus) A Bury (Slovakia) I Zelenay	7^{7}	6
(El Salvador) M Arévalo (United States) J Cerretani	6^{5}	4

Final
3	(Chile) J Peralta (Chile) H Podlipnik	4	4
4	(Belarus) A Bury (Slovakia) I Zelenay	6	6
