= 2010 UniCredit Czech Open – Singles =

Singles
- 2010 UniCredit Czech Open

Final
- Champion: (Czech Republic) Jan Hájek
- Runner-up: (Czech Republic) Radek Štěpánek
- Score: 6–0, ret.

Events
Singles	Doubles
← 2009 ·	UniCredit Czech Open	· 2011 →

Jan Hájek was the defending champion, and he defended his title, because Radek Štěpánek retired in the final.

== Seeds ==
1. (Czech Republic) Radek Štěpánek (final)
2. (Spain) Albert Montañés (second round)
3. (Romania) Victor Hănescu (second round)
4. (Belgium) Olivier Rochus (quarterfinals)
5. (Finland) Jarkko Nieminen (quarterfinals)
6. (Czech Republic) Jan Hájek (champion)
7. (Kazakhstan) Andrey Golubev (semifinals)
8. (United States) Michael Russell (first round)

== Draw ==
=== Key ===
- Q = Qualifier
- WC = Wild card
- LL = Lucky loser
- Alt = Alternate
- SE = Special exempt
- PR = Protected ranking
- ITF = ITF entry
- JE = Junior exempt
- w/o = Walkover
- r = Retired
- d = Defaulted
- SR = Special ranking

=== Finals ===
Semifinals
1/WC	(Czech Republic) Radek Štěpánek	6	6
7	(Kazakhstan) Andrey Golubev	3	2
6	(Czech Republic) Jan Hájek	6	2	6
Q	(Czech Republic) Jaroslav Pospíšil	4	6	3

Final
1/WC	(Czech Republic) Radek Štěpánek	0	0^{r}
6	(Czech Republic) Jan Hájek	6	0

=== Top half ===
First round
1/WC	(Czech Republic) R Štěpánek	6	7
(Spain) A Martín	3	6^{3}
Q	(France) N Renavand	7	7
(India) S Devvarman	5	6^{3}
(Spain) M Granollers	6	7
(Czech Republic) J Vaněk	4	6^{2}
WC	(Czech Republic) R Rumler	1	3
5	(Finland) J Nieminen	6	6
4	(Belgium) O Rochus	3	6	7
(Belgium) S Darcis	6	3	6^{5}
(Slovenia) G Žemlja	6	6
Q	(Russia) I Belyaev	4	2
(Czech Republic) J Hernych	6	6
(Belgium) C Rochus	3	3
(Kazakhstan) Y Schukin	3	2
7	(Kazakhstan) A Golubev	6	6

Second round
1/WC	(Czech Republic) R Štěpánek	7	6
Q	(France) N Renavand	5	2
(Spain) M Granollers	6	3	4
5	(Finland) J Nieminen	2	6	6
4	(Belgium) O Rochus	5	6	6
(Slovenia) G Žemlja	7	2	2
(Czech Republic) J Hernych	6^{5}	3
7	(Kazakhstan) A Golubev	7	6

Quarterfinals
1/WC	(Czech Republic) R Štěpánek	7	6
5	(Finland) J Nieminen	5	4
4	(Belgium) O Rochus	1	7	3
7	(Kazakhstan) A Golubev	6	6^{2}	6

Semifinals
1/WC	(Czech Republic) R Štěpánek	6	6
7	(Kazakhstan) A Golubev	3	2

=== Bottom half ===
First round
6	(Czech Republic) J Hájek	6	7
(Argentina) J-M Aranguren	1	5
(Portugal) R Machado	6	6^{4}	7
(Slovakia) D Hrbatý	2	7	5
(Spain) A Ramos-Viñolas	4	6	7
(Chile) J Aguilar	6	4	6^{4}
Q	(Slovakia) M Semjan	4	2
3/WC	(Romania) V Hănescu	6	6
8	(United States) M Russell	7	1	2
Q	(Czech Republic) J Pospíšil	6^{6}	6	6
(Spain) G Alcaide	6	7
(Argentina) JP Brzezicki	1	6^{4}
(Spain) D Muñoz-De La Nava	3	2
(Portugal) F Gil	6	6
(Spain) D Marrero	0	1
2/WC	(Spain) A Montañés	6	6

Second round
6	(Czech Republic) J Hájek	6	7
(Portugal) R Machado	4	6^{2}
(Spain) A Ramos-Viñolas	3	6	6
3/WC	(Romania) V Hănescu	6	4	2
Q	(Czech Republic) J Pospíšil	6^{2}	6	6
(Spain) G Alcaide	7	2	0
(Portugal) F Gil	6	6
2/WC	(Spain) A Montañés	1	4

Quarterfinals
6	(Czech Republic) J Hájek	6	6
(Spain) A Ramos-Viñolas	4	0
Q	(Czech Republic) J Pospíšil	7	6
(Portugal) F Gil	6^{8}	4

Semifinals
6	(Czech Republic) J Hájek	6	2	6
Q	(Czech Republic) J Pospíšil	4	6	3
