= 2010 UniCredit Czech Open =

- Date: May 31 – June 5
- Edition: 17th
- Location: Prostějov, Czech Republic
- Venue: TK Agrofert Prostějov

Champions

Singles
- (Czech Republic) Jan Hájek

Doubles
- (Spain) Marcel Granollers / (Spain) David Marrero
← 2009 ·	UniCredit Czech Open	· 2011 →

The 2010 UniCredit Czech Open was a professional tennis tournament played on outdoor red clay courts. It was part of the 2010 ATP Challenger Tour. It took place in Prostějov, Czech Republic between 31 May and 5 June 2010.

== ATP entrants ==
=== Seeds ===
Nationality	Player	Ranking*	Seeding
CZE	Radek Štěpánek	20	1
ESP	Albert Montañés	34	2
ROU	Victor Hănescu	37	3
BEL	Olivier Rochus	62	4
FIN	Jarkko Nieminen	69	5
CZE	Jan Hájek	75	6
KAZ	Andrey Golubev	77	7
USA	Michael Russell	82	8

- Rankings are as of May 24, 2010.

=== Other entrants ===
The following players received wildcards into the singles main draw:

- (Romania) Victor Hănescu
- (Spain) Albert Montañés
- (Czech Republic) Robert Rumler
- (Czech Republic) Radek Štěpánek

The following players received entry from the qualifying draw:

- (Russia) Ilya Belyaev
- (Czech Republic) Jaroslav Pospíšil
- (France) Nicholas Renevand
- (Slovakia) Marek Semjan

== Champions ==
=== Singles ===
(Czech Republic) Jan Hájek def. (Czech Republic) Radek Štěpánek, 6–0, ret.

=== Doubles ===
(Spain) Marcel Granollers / (Spain) David Marrero def. (Sweden) Johan Brunström / (Netherlands Antilles) Jean-Julien Rojer, 3–6, 6–4, [10–6]
