= 2017 UniCredit Czech Open – Doubles =

Doubles
- 2017 UniCredit Czech Open

Final
- Champions: (Argentina) Guillermo Durán (Argentina) Andrés Molteni
- Runners-up: (Czech Republic) Roman Jebavý (Chile) Hans Podlipnik-Castillo
- Score: 7–6^{(7–5)}, 6–7^{(5–7)}, [10–6]

Events
Singles	Doubles
← 2016 ·	UniCredit Czech Open	· 2018 →

Aliaksandr Bury and Igor Zelenay were the defending champions but chose to defend their title with different partners. Bury partnered Ariel Behar but lost in the quarterfinals to Guillermo Durán and Andrés Molteni. Zelenay partnered Julian Knowle but lost in the first round to David Marrero and Leander Paes.

Durán and Molteni win the title after defeating Roman Jebavý and Hans Podlipnik-Castillo 7–6^{(7–5)}, 6–7^{(5–7)}, [10–6] in the final.

== Seeds ==
1. (Spain) David Marrero / (India) Leander Paes (semifinals)
2. (Argentina) Guillermo Durán / (Argentina) Andrés Molteni (champions)
3. (Czech Republic) Roman Jebavý / (Chile) Hans Podlipnik-Castillo (final)
4. (Croatia) Dino Marcan / (Croatia) Franko Škugor (first round)

== Draw ==
=== Key ===
- Q = Qualifier
- WC = Wild card
- LL = Lucky loser
- Alt = Alternate
- ITF = ITF entry
- PR = Protected ranking
- SR = Special ranking
- SE = Special exempt
- JE = Junior exempt
- JR = Junior Accelerator Programme entrant
- CO = College Accelerator Programme entrant
- NG = Next Gen Accelerator Program entrant
- w/o = Walkover
- r = Retired
- d = Defaulted

First round
1	(Spain) D Marrero (India) L Paes	7^{7}	1	[10]
(Austria) J Knowle (Slovakia) I Zelenay	6^{4}	6	[6]
(Sweden) J Brunström (France) H Nys	6	3	[6]
(Moldova) R Albot (Ukraine) D Molchanov	3	6	[10]
3	(Czech Republic) R Jebavý (Chile) H Podlipnik-Castillo	6	6
WC	(Czech Republic) Tomáš Papik (Czech Republic) P Rikl	4	4
(Chinese Taipei) C-p Hsieh (Chinese Taipei) H-y Peng	3	4
WC	(Czech Republic) Z Kolář (Czech Republic) M Vocel	6	6
(Germany) K Krawietz (Italy) A Motti	5	4
Alt	(Argentina) G Andreozzi (Brazil) J Souza	7	6
(El Salvador) M Arévalo (United States) J Cerretani	2	6	[10]
4	(Croatia) D Marcan (Croatia) F Škugor	6	4	[3]
WC	(Czech Republic) D Kellovský (Czech Republic) Petr Michnev	3	4
(Uruguay) A Behar (Belarus) A Bury	6	6
(Switzerland) L Margaroli (United States) T Sandgren	5	4
2	(Argentina) G Durán (Argentina) A Molteni	7	6

Quarterfinals
1	(Spain) D Marrero (India) L Paes	7^{7}	3	[10]
(Moldova) R Albot (Ukraine) D Molchanov	6^{3}	6	[7]
3	(Czech Republic) R Jebavý (Chile) H Podlipnik-Castillo	6	6
WC	(Czech Republic) Z Kolář (Czech Republic) M Vocel	4	3
Alt	(Argentina) G Andreozzi (Brazil) J Souza	7^{7}	7
(El Salvador) M Arévalo (United States) J Cerretani	6^{5}	5
(Uruguay) A Behar (Belarus) A Bury	3	4
2	(Argentina) G Durán (Argentina) A Molteni	6	6

Semifinals
1	(Spain) D Marrero (India) L Paes	3	4
3	(Czech Republic) R Jebavý (Chile) H Podlipnik-Castillo	6	6
Alt	(Argentina) G Andreozzi (Brazil) J Souza	6	4	[6]
2	(Argentina) G Durán (Argentina) A Molteni	4	6	[10]

Final
3	(Czech Republic) R Jebavý (Chile) H Podlipnik-Castillo	6^{5}	7^{7}	[6]
2	(Argentina) G Durán (Argentina) A Molteni	7^{7}	6^{5}	[10]
