= 2018 Moneta Czech Open – Singles =

Tennis tournament

Singles
- 2018 Moneta Czech Open

Final
- Champion: (Spain) Jaume Munar
- Runner-up: (Serbia) Laslo Đere
- Score: 6–1, 6–3

Events
Singles	Doubles
← 2017 ·	Moneta Czech Open	· 2019 →

Jiří Veselý was the defending champion but lost in the second round to Elias Ymer.

Jaume Munar won the title after defeating Laslo Đere 6–1, 6–3 in the final.

== Seeds ==
1. (Spain) Guillermo García López (semifinals)
2. (Uruguay) Pablo Cuevas (first round)
3. (Spain) Roberto Carballés Baena (first round)
4. (Argentina) Guido Pella (quarterfinals)
5. (Czech Republic) Jiří Veselý (second round)
6. (Bosnia and Herzegovina) Mirza Bašić (first round)
7. (Kazakhstan) Mikhail Kukushkin (second round, withdrew)
8. (Moldova) Radu Albot (second round)

== Draw ==
=== Key ===
- Q = Qualifier
- WC = Wild card
- LL = Lucky loser
- Alt = Alternate
- SE = Special exempt
- PR = Protected ranking
- ITF = ITF entry
- JE = Junior exempt
- w/o = Walkover
- r = Retired
- d = Defaulted
- SR = Special ranking

=== Finals ===
Semifinals
1	(Spain) Guillermo García López	6^{8}	6	6^{4}
(Serbia) Laslo Đere	7^{10}	3	7^{7}
(Austria) Gerald Melzer	6	3	2
(Spain) Jaume Munar	4	6	6

Final
(Serbia) Laslo Đere	1	3
(Spain) Jaume Munar	6	6

=== Top half ===
First round
1	(Spain) G García López	6	6
(France) G Sakharov	4	4
Q	(Uruguay) M Cuevas	4	3
WC	(Brazil) T Bellucci	6	6
(Germany) J Choinski	7	2	4
(Czech Republic) Z Kolář	5	6	6
Q	(Italy) F Gaio	6	7^{7}
6	(Bosnia and Herzegovina) M Bašić	2	6^{1}
4	(Argentina) G Pella	6	6
(Slovakia) N Gombos	3	2
(Portugal) J Domingues	6	6
WC	(Slovakia) F Horanský	1	3
(Argentina) R Olivo	1	3
(Serbia) L Đere	6	6
(France) A Hoang	1	3
7	(Kazakhstan) M Kukushkin	6	6

Second round
1	(Spain) G García López	6	7^{7}
WC	(Brazil) T Bellucci	1	6^{4}
(Czech Republic) Z Kolář	5	0
Q	(Italy) F Gaio	7	6
4	(Argentina) G Pella	7	6
(Portugal) J Domingues	5	3
(Serbia) L Đere	w/o
7	(Kazakhstan) M Kukushkin

Quarterfinals
1	(Spain) G García López	6	6
Q	(Italy) F Gaio	3	4
4	(Argentina) G Pella	4	5
(Serbia) L Đere	6	7

Semifinals
1	(Spain) G García López	6^{8}	6	6^{4}
(Serbia) L Đere	7^{10}	3	7^{7}

=== Bottom half ===
First round
8	(Moldova) R Albot	6	6
(Latvia) E Gulbis	3	3
Alt	(France) B Bonzi	3	2
(Italy) S Caruso	6	6
LL	(Czech Republic) Marek Jaloviec	3	0
(Austria) G Melzer	6	6
WC	(Czech Republic) V Šafránek	3	7^{7}	6
3	(Spain) R Carballés Baena	6	6^{2}	4
5	(Czech Republic) J Veselý	6	6
Q	(Italy) G Mager	3	3
Q	(Czech Republic) J Šátral	5	6	5
(Sweden) E Ymer	7	4	7
Alt	(France) V Millot	2	2^{r}
(Spain) J Munar	6	3
(Czech Republic) A Pavlásek	7^{7}	7^{7}
2/WC	(Uruguay) P Cuevas	6^{3}	6^{4}

Second round
8	(Moldova) R Albot	3	5
(Italy) S Caruso	6	7
(Austria) G Melzer	6	6
WC	(Czech Republic) V Šafránek	1	0
5	(Czech Republic) J Veselý	2	6	4
(Sweden) E Ymer	6	3	6
(Spain) J Munar	6^{6}	6	7
(Czech Republic) A Pavlásek	7^{8}	4	5

Quarterfinals
(Italy) S Caruso	4	3
(Austria) G Melzer	6	6
(Sweden) E Ymer	6	1	1
(Spain) J Munar	3	6	6

Semifinals
(Austria) G Melzer	6	3	2
(Spain) J Munar	4	6	6
