= 2012 UniCredit Czech Open =

- Date: 4–10 June
- Edition: 19th
- Surface: Clay
- Location: Prostějov, Czech Republic
- Venue: TK Agrofert Prostějov

Champions

Singles
- (Germany) Florian Mayer

Doubles
- (Chinese Taipei) Hsieh Cheng-peng / (Chinese Taipei) Lee Hsin-han
← 2011 ·	UniCredit Czech Open	· 2013 →

The 2012 UniCredit Czech Open was a professional tennis tournament played on clay courts. It was the 19th edition of the tournament which was part of the 2012 ATP Challenger Tour. It took place in Prostějov, Czech Republic between 4 and 10 June 2012.

== Singles main draw entrants ==
=== Seeds ===
Country	Player	Rank^{1}	Seed
ESP	Fernando Verdasco	16	1
CZE	Radek Štěpánek	27	2
GER	Florian Mayer	35	3
KAZ	Mikhail Kukushkin	53	4
BEL	Steve Darcis	61	5
ESP	Albert Montañés	65	6
ESP	Guillermo García López	72	7
ESP	Rubén Ramírez Hidalgo	74	8

- ^{1} Rankings are as of May 28, 2012.

=== Other entrants ===
The following players received wildcards into the singles main draw:

- (Germany) Florian Mayer
- (Czech Republic) Radek Štěpánek
- (Spain) Fernando Verdasco
- (Czech Republic) Jiří Veselý

The following players received entry as an alternate into the singles main draw:

- (Slovakia) Kamil Čapkovič
- (Slovakia) Pavol Červenák
- (Dominican Republic) Víctor Estrella

The following players received entry from the qualifying draw:

- (Belarus) Uladzimir Ignatik
- (France) Axel Michon
- (Czech Republic) Jaroslav Pospíšil
- (Slovakia) Marek Semjan

== Champions ==
=== Singles ===
- (Germany) Florian Mayer def. (Czech Republic) Jan Hájek, 7–6^{(7–1)}, 3–6, 7–6^{(7–3)}

=== Doubles ===
- (Chinese Taipei) Hsieh Cheng-peng / (Chinese Taipei) Lee Hsin-han def. (Australia) Colin Ebelthite / (Australia) John Peers, 7–5, 7–5
