= 2012 UniCredit Czech Open – Doubles =

Doubles
- 2012 UniCredit Czech Open

Final
- Champions: (Chinese Taipei) Hsieh Cheng-peng (Chinese Taipei) Lee Hsin-han
- Runners-up: (Australia) Colin Ebelthite (Australia) John Peers
- Score: 7–5, 7–5

Events
Singles	Doubles
← 2011 ·	UniCredit Czech Open	· 2013 →

Sergei Bubka and Adrián Menéndez were the defending champions but Bubka decided not to participate.
Menéndez played alongside Steve Darcis.
Hsieh Cheng-peng and Lee Hsin-han defeated Colin Ebelthite and John Peers 7–5, 7–5 in the final to win the title.

== Seeds ==
1. (Sweden) Johan Brunström / (Germany) Philipp Marx (first round)
2. (Czech Republic) Lukáš Dlouhý / (Slovakia) Michal Mertiňák (semifinals)
3. (Poland) Tomasz Bednarek / (France) Olivier Charroin (first round)
4. (United States) Travis Parrott / (Slovakia) Igor Zelenay (quarterfinals)

== Draw ==
=== Key ===
- Q = Qualifier
- WC = Wild card
- LL = Lucky loser
- Alt = Alternate
- SE = Special exempt
- PR = Protected ranking
- ITF = ITF entry
- JE = Junior exempt
- w/o = Walkover
- r = Retired
- d = Defaulted
- SR = Special ranking

=== Draw ===
First round
1	(Sweden) J Brunström (Germany) P Marx	6	6^{2}	[4]
WC	(Czech Republic) D Škoch (Chinese Taipei) T-h Yang	4	7	[10]
(Australia) C Ebelthite (Australia) J Peers	6	7^{7}
(Spain) D Muñoz de la Nava (Spain) R Ramírez Hidalgo	3	6^{5}
3	(Poland) T Bednarek (France) O Charroin	7^{7}	3	[4]
(Belgium) S Darcis (Spain) A Menéndez	6^{1}	6	[10]
(Russia) T Gbashvili (United States) W Odesnik
(United States) N Monroe (Germany) S Stadler	w/o
(Chinese Taipei) C-p Hsieh (Chinese Taipei) H-h Lee	6	6
WC	(Czech Republic) Pavel Krček (Czech Republic) Robert Rumler	2	3
(Czech Republic) L Rosol (Brazil) J Souza	2	6	[8]
4	(United States) T Parrott (Slovakia) I Zelenay	6	0	[10]
(Italy) F Cipolla (Italy) F Volandri
(Czech Republic) J Hájek (Czech Republic) J Pospíšil	w/o
WC	(Slovakia) F Horanský (Czech Republic) J Veselý	6	5	[3]
2	(Czech Republic) L Dlouhý (Slovakia) M Mertiňák	3	7	[10]

Quarterfinals
WC	(Czech Republic) D Škoch (Chinese Taipei) T-h Yang	2	4
(Australia) C Ebelthite (Australia) J Peers	6	6
(Belgium) S Darcis (Spain) A Menéndez	6^{5}	6	[10]
(United States) N Monroe (Germany) S Stadler	7^{7}	4	[6]
(Chinese Taipei) C-p Hsieh (Chinese Taipei) H-h Lee	6	6
4	(United States) T Parrott (Slovakia) I Zelenay	3	4
(Czech Republic) J Hájek (Czech Republic) J Pospíšil	4	3
2	(Czech Republic) L Dlouhý (Slovakia) M Mertiňák	6	6

Semifinals
(Australia) C Ebelthite (Australia) J Peers	6	6
(Belgium) S Darcis (Spain) A Menéndez	4	2
(Chinese Taipei) C-p Hsieh (Chinese Taipei) H-h Lee	6^{7}	7^{7}	[10]
2	(Czech Republic) L Dlouhý (Slovakia) M Mertiňák	7^{9}	6^{3}	[6]

Final
(Australia) C Ebelthite (Australia) J Peers	5	5
(Chinese Taipei) C-p Hsieh (Chinese Taipei) H-h Lee	7	7
