= 2015 UniCredit Czech Open – Singles =

Singles
- 2015 UniCredit Czech Open

Final
- Champions: (Czech Republic) Jiří Veselý
- Runners-up: (Serbia) Laslo Djere
- Score: 6–4, 6–2

Events
Singles	Doubles
← 2014 ·	UniCredit Czech Open	· 2016 →

Jiří Veselý was the defending champion and successfully defended his title, defeating Laslo Djere in the final, 6–4, 6–2.

== Seeds ==
1. (Slovakia) Martin Kližan (second round)
2. (Czech Republic) Jiří Veselý (champion)
3. (Spain) Marcel Granollers (quarterfinals)
4. (Spain) Pablo Carreño Busta (first round)
5. (Colombia) Santiago Giraldo (second round)
6. (Serbia) Dušan Lajović (quarterfinals)
7. (Brazil) João Souza (semifinals)
8. (Slovenia) Blaž Kavčič (first round)

== Draw ==
=== Key ===
- Q = Qualifier
- WC = Wild card
- LL = Lucky loser
- Alt = Alternate
- SE = Special exempt
- PR = Protected ranking
- ITF = ITF entry
- JE = Junior exempt
- w/o = Walkover
- r = Retired
- d = Defaulted
- SR = Special ranking

=== Finals ===
Semifinals
(Serbia) Laslo Djere	6^{3}	7^{7}	7
7	(Brazil) João Souza	7^{7}	6^{4}	5
Q	(Belarus) Uladzimir Ignatik	7^{7}	2	2
2/WC	(Czech Republic) Jiří Veselý	6^{1}	6	6

Final
(Serbia) Laslo Djere	4	2
2/WC	(Czech Republic) Jiří Veselý	6	6

=== Top half ===
First round
1/WC	(Slovakia) M Kližan	4	6	7^{14}
(Slovakia) N Gombos	6	0	6^{12}
(Serbia) L Djere	6	7^{7}
Q	(Switzerland) H Laaksonen	4	6^{4}
(Czech Republic) J Hernych	6	6
(Kazakhstan) A Golubev	2	3
(Czech Republic) A Pavlásek	3	3
6	(Serbia) D Lajović	6	6
3/WC	(Spain) M Granollers	6	6
(Lithuania) R Berankis	2	4
(Kazakhstan) A Nedovyesov	6	6^{4}	7^{7}
Q	(Croatia) N Mektić	4	7^{7}	6^{3}
(Czech Republic) R Štěpánek	4	6	1
(France) P-H Mathieu	6	4	6
(Uzbekistan) F Dustov	3	5
7	(Brazil) J Souza	6	7

Second round
1/WC	(Slovakia) M Kližan	5	6	2
(Serbia) L Djere	7	2	6
(Czech Republic) J Hernych	4	2
6	(Serbia) D Lajović	6	6
3/WC	(Spain) M Granollers	6	6
(Kazakhstan) A Nedovyesov	3	1
(France) P-H Mathieu	6^{2}	3
7	(Brazil) J Souza	7^{7}	6

Quarterfinals
(Serbia) L Djere	4	6	6
6	(Serbia) D Lajović	6	4	2
3/WC	(Spain) M Granollers	6	4	4
7	(Brazil) J Souza	3	6	6

Semifinals
(Serbia) L Djere	6^{3}	7^{7}	7
7	(Brazil) J Souza	7^{7}	6^{5}	5

=== Bottom half ===
First round
8	(Slovenia) B Kavčič	7^{7}	2	2
Q	(Belarus) U Ignatik	6^{4}	6	6
Alt	(Bosnia and Herzegovina) A Šetkić	3	2
(Italy) M Cecchinato	6	6
(Czech Republic) J Mertl	3	2
(Brazil) A Ghem	6	6
(Germany) M Bachinger	6	1	6
4	(Spain) P Carreño Busta	3	6	3
5/WC	(Colombia) S Giraldo	7^{7}	6
(Romania) M Copil	6^{4}	2
(Italy) L Vanni	6^{1}	2
(Serbia) F Krajinović	7^{7}	6
(Russia) K Khachanov	6	4	6^{2}
Q	(France) A Michon	3	6	7^{7}
(Hungary) M Fucsovics	5	3
2/WC	(Czech Republic) J Veselý	7	6

Second round
Q	(Belarus) U Ignatik	2	6	7
(Italy) M Cecchinato	6	4	5
(Brazil) A Ghem	7^{8}	6
(Germany) M Bachinger	6^{6}	4
5/WC	(Colombia) S Giraldo	3	3
(Serbia) F Krajinović	6	6
Q	(France) A Michon	6^{6}	5
2/WC	(Czech Republic) J Veselý	7^{8}	7

Quarterfinals
Q	(Belarus) U Ignatik	7^{7}	6
(Brazil) A Ghem	6^{5}	4
(Serbia) F Krajinović	4	4
2/WC	(Czech Republic) J Veselý	6	6

Semifinals
Q	(Belarus) U Ignatik	7^{7}	2	2
2/WC	(Czech Republic) J Veselý	6^{1}	6	6
