= 2016 UniCredit Czech Open – Singles =

Singles
- 2016 UniCredit Czech Open

Final
- Champion: (Kazakhstan) Mikhail Kukushkin
- Runner-up: (Hungary) Márton Fucsovics
- Score: 6–1, 6–2

Events
Singles	Doubles
← 2015 ·	UniCredit Czech Open	· 2017 →

Jiří Veselý was the defending champion, but lost in the quarterfinals to eventual champion Mikhail Kukushkin.

Kukushkin won the title, defeating Márton Fucsovics in the final, 6–1, 6–2.

== Seeds ==
1. (Lithuania) Ričardas Berankis (quarterfinals)
2. (Czech Republic) Lukáš Rosol (quarterfinals)
3. (Czech Republic) Jiří Veselý (quarterfinals)
4. (Spain) Íñigo Cervantes (semifinals)
5. (Bosnia and Herzegovina) Damir Džumhur (first round, retired)
6. (Kazakhstan) Mikhail Kukushkin (champion)
7. (Brazil) Rogério Dutra Silva (second round)
8. (Netherlands) Robin Haase (first round)

== Draw ==
=== Key ===
- Q = Qualifier
- WC = Wild card
- LL = Lucky loser
- Alt = Alternate
- ITF = ITF entry
- PR = Protected ranking
- SR = Special ranking
- SE = Special exempt
- JE = Junior exempt
- JR = Junior Accelerator Programme entrant
- CO = College Accelerator Programme entrant
- NG = Next Gen Accelerator Program entrant
- w/o = Walkover
- r = Retired
- d = Defaulted

=== Finals ===
Semifinals
Q	(Hungary) Márton Fucsovics	6	6
4	(Spain) Íñigo Cervantes	2	2
6	(Kazakhstan) Mikhail Kukushkin	6	6
(Russia) Karen Khachanov	1	4

Final
Q	(Hungary) Márton Fucsovics	1	2
6	(Kazakhstan) Mikhail Kukushkin	6	6

=== Top half ===
First round
1	(Lithuania) R Berankis	6	6
WC	(Czech Republic) Z Kolář	4	4
Q	(Brazil) J Souza	5	6	6
(Turkey) M İlhan	7	2	4
Q	(Hungary) M Fucsovics	6	2
(Serbia) P Krstin	4	0^{r}
(Chile) G Lama	6	6
8	(Netherlands) R Haase	3	3
4	(Spain) Í Cervantes	7^{7}	6^{5}	6
(Germany) D Brands	6^{5}	7^{7}	3
(Russia) A Kudryavtsev	5	4
WC	(Czech Republic) D Kellovský	7	6
(Czech Republic) A Pavlásek	6	6
Q	(Argentina) JI Londero	4	3
(Argentina) F Bagnis	6^{2}	4
7	(Brazil) R Dutra Silva	7^{7}	6

Second round
1	(Lithuania) R Berankis	7	6
Q	(Brazil) J Souza	5	3
Q	(Hungary) M Fucsovics	2	7	6
(Chile) G Lama	6	5	4
4	(Spain) Í Cervantes	6	6
WC	(Czech Republic) D Kellovský	2	1
(Czech Republic) A Pavlásek	3	7^{8}	6
7	(Brazil) R Dutra Silva	6	6^{6}	1

Quarterfinals
1	(Lithuania) R Berankis	4	6^{2}
Q	(Hungary) M Fucsovics	6	7^{7}
4	(Spain) Í Cervantes	7^{7}	3	7^{9}
(Czech Republic) A Pavlásek	6^{2}	6	6^{7}

Semifinals
Q	(Hungary) M Fucsovics	6	6
4	(Spain) Í Cervantes	2	2

=== Bottom half ===
First round
6	(Kazakhstan) M Kukushkin	6	6
(Estonia) J Zopp	3	0
(Portugal) G Elias	6^{7}	7	1
(Italy) A Giannessi	7^{9}	5	6
WC	(Slovakia) A Molčan	4	3
WC	(Serbia) J Tipsarević	6	6
LL	(Serbia) M Janković	6^{4}	7^{10}	5
3	(Czech Republic) J Veselý	7^{7}	6^{8}	7
5	(Bosnia and Herzegovina) D Džumhur	5	1^{r}
SE	(Argentina) G Andreozzi	7	4
(Russia) K Khachanov	6^{3}	6	6
Alt	(Italy) M Cecchinato	7^{7}	3	4
(Sweden) E Ymer	6	1
Q	(Brazil) M Demoliner	4	1^{r}
LL	(Kazakhstan) D Popko	4	6^{4}
2	(Czech Republic) L Rosol	6	7^{7}

Second round
6	(Kazakhstan) M Kukushkin	7^{7}	7
(Italy) A Giannessi	6^{1}	5
WC	(Serbia) J Tipsarević	6^{5}	3
3	(Czech Republic) J Veselý	7^{7}	6
SE	(Argentina) G Andreozzi	6^{6}	5
(Russia) K Khachanov	7^{8}	7
(Sweden) E Ymer	2	6	3
2	(Czech Republic) L Rosol	6	2	6

Quarterfinals
6	(Kazakhstan) M Kukushkin	7	3	6
3	(Czech Republic) J Veselý	5	6	2
(Russia) K Khachanov	3	6	6
2	(Czech Republic) L Rosol	6	4	3

Semifinals
6	(Kazakhstan) M Kukushkin	6	6
(Russia) K Khachanov	1	4
