= 2026 UniCredit Czech Open =

- Date: 1 – 7 June
- Edition: 33rd
- Surface: Clay
- Location: Prostějov, Czech Republic
- Venue: TK Agrofert Prostějov

Champions

Singles
- (Argentina) Sebastián Báez

Doubles
- (Slovakia) Miloš Karol / (Czech Republic) Andrew Paulson
- Czech Open

The 2026 UniCredit Czech Open was a professional tennis tournament played on clay courts. It was the 33rd edition of the tournament which was part of the 2026 ATP Challenger Tour. It took place in Prostějov, Czech Republic between 1 and 7 June 2026.

== Singles main-draw entrants ==
=== Seeds ===
Country	Player	Rank^{1}	Seed
ARG	Sebastián Báez	64	1
CZE	Vít Kopřiva	66	2
BIH	Damir Džumhur	87	3
KAZ	Alexander Shevchenko	88	4
CZE	Dalibor Svrčina	108	5
SVK	Alex Molčan	110	6
ESP	Roberto Bautista Agut	117	7
CZE	Zdeněk Kolář	162	8

- ^{1} Rankings are as of 25 May 2026.

=== Other entrants ===
The following players received wildcards into the singles main draw:

- (Czech Republic) Jonáš Forejtek
- (Slovakia) Norbert Gombos
- (Czech Republic) Maxim Mrva

The following player received entry into the singles main draw as a special exempt:

- (Czech Republic) Martin Krumich

The following player received entry into the singles main draw as an alternate:

- (Czech Republic) Hynek Bartoň

The following players received entry from the qualifying draw:

- (Italy) Carlo Alberto Caniato
- (Japan) Taro Daniel
- (Norway) Viktor Durasovic
- (Slovakia) Miloš Karol
- (Czech Republic) Jan Kumstát
- (Slovakia) Andrej Martin

== Champions ==
=== Singles ===
- (Argentina) Sebastián Báez def. (Slovakia) Alex Molčan 6–4, 6–2.

=== Doubles ===
- (Slovakia) Miloš Karol / (Czech Republic) Andrew Paulson def. Ivan Liutarevich / (Poland) Filip Pieczonka 6–3, 6–3.
