= 2026 UniCredit Czech Open – Doubles =

Doubles
- 2026 UniCredit Czech Open

Final
- Champions: (Slovakia) Miloš Karol (Czech Republic) Andrew Paulson
- Runners-up: Ivan Liutarevich (Poland) Filip Pieczonka
- Score: 6–3, 6–3

Events
Singles	Doubles
- UniCredit Czech Open

Petr Nouza and Patrik Rikl were the defending champions but chose not to defend their title.

Miloš Karol and Andrew Paulson won the title after defeating Ivan Liutarevich and Filip Pieczonka 6–3, 6–3 in the final.

== Seeds ==
1. Ivan Liutarevich / (Poland) Filip Pieczonka (final)
2. (United States) Nathaniel Lammons / (United States) Jackson Withrow (quarterfinals)
3. (South Korea) Nam Ji-sung / (Finland) Patrik Niklas-Salminen (first round)
4. (Poland) Karol Drzewiecki / (Poland) Piotr Matuszewski (semifinals)

== Draw ==
Key

- Q = Qualifier
- WC = Wild card
- LL = Lucky loser
- Alt = Alternate
- ITF = ITF entry
- PR = Protected ranking
- SR = Special ranking
- SE = Special exempt
- JE = Junior exempt
- JR = Junior Accelerator Programme entrant
- CO = College Accelerator Programme entrant
- NG = Next Gen Accelerator Program entrant
- w/o = Walkover
- r = Retired
- d = Defaulted

First round
1	I Liutarevich (Poland) F Pieczonka	6^{4}	6	[11]
(Spain) S Martos Gornés (Poland) S Walków	7^{7}	3	[9]
(Bosnia and Herzegovina) M Bašić (Bosnia and Herzegovina) D Džumhur	3	6	[8]
(Croatia) A Kalender (Serbia) I Sabanov	6	3	[10]
4	(Poland) K Drzewiecki (Poland) P Matuszewski	6	6
WC	(Czech Republic) M Mrva (Czech Republic) Vojtěch Valeš	4	3
(Czech Republic) Z Kolář (Czech Republic) M Vocel	6	6
(Brazil) P Boscardin Dias (Brazil) D Dutra da Silva	4	4
(Slovakia) L Pokorný (Ukraine) V Sachko	7	6
(United States) A Ayeni (France) L Pavlovic	5	2
PR	(Tunisia) S Mansouri (Czech Republic) D Poljak	6	6
3	(South Korea) J-s Nam (Finland) P Niklas-Salminen	2	4
WC	(Czech Republic) Jan Klimas (Czech Republic) Dominik Vágner	4	1
(Slovakia) M Karol (Czech Republic) A Paulson	6	6
(Spain) Í Cervantes (Ukraine) D Molchanov	3	4
2	(United States) N Lammons (United States) J Withrow	6	6

Quarterfinals
1	I Liutarevich (Poland) F Pieczonka	6	6
(Croatia) A Kalender (Serbia) I Sabanov	2	2
4	(Poland) K Drzewiecki (Poland) P Matuszewski	6	6
(Czech Republic) Z Kolář (Czech Republic) M Vocel	3	2
(Slovakia) L Pokorný (Ukraine) V Sachko	3	6	[7]
PR	(Tunisia) S Mansouri (Czech Republic) D Poljak	6	4	[10]
(Slovakia) M Karol (Czech Republic) A Paulson	6	7^{7}
2	(United States) N Lammons (United States) J Withrow	3	6^{4}

Semifinals
1	I Liutarevich (Poland) F Pieczonka	6	6
4	(Poland) K Drzewiecki (Poland) P Matuszewski	2	3
PR	(Tunisia) S Mansouri (Czech Republic) D Poljak	1	3
(Slovakia) M Karol (Czech Republic) A Paulson	6	6

Final
1	I Liutarevich (Poland) F Pieczonka	3	3
(Slovakia) M Karol (Czech Republic) A Paulson	6	6
