= 2016 UniCredit Czech Open =

- Date: 31 May – 4 June
- Edition: 23
- Draw: 32S / 16D
- Prize money: €106,500+H
- Surface: Clay
- Location: Prostějov, Czech Republic
- Venue: TK Agrofert Prostějov

Champions

Singles
- (Kazakhstan) Mikhail Kukushkin

Doubles
- (Belarus) Aliaksandr Bury / (Slovakia) Igor Zelenay
- UniCredit Czech Open

The 2016 UniCredit Czech Open is a professional tennis tournament played on clay courts. It is the 23rd edition of the tournament which is part of the 2016 ATP Challenger Tour. It took place in Prostějov, Czech Republic between 31 May and 4 June 2016.

== Singles main-draw entrants ==
=== Seeds ===
Country	Player	Rank^{1}	Seed
LIT	Ričardas Berankis	50	1
CZE	Lukáš Rosol	59	2
CZE	Jiří Veselý	60	3
ESP	Íñigo Cervantes	69	4
BIH	Damir Džumhur	73	5
KAZ	Mikhail Kukushkin	83	6
BRA	Rogério Dutra Silva	85	7
NED	Robin Haase	86	8

- ^{1} Rankings are as of May 23, 2016.

=== Other entrants ===
The following players received wildcards into the singles main draw:

- (Czech Republic) Dominik Kellovský
- (Czech Republic) Zdeněk Kolář
- (Slovakia) Alex Molčan
- (Serbia) Janko Tipsarević

The following players received entry as alternates into the singles main draw:

- (Italy) Marco Cecchinato

The following players received special entry into the singles main draw:

- (Argentina) Guido Andreozzi

The following players received entry from the qualifying draw:

- (Brazil) Marcelo Demoliner
- (Hungary) Márton Fucsovics
- (Argentina) Juan Ignacio Londero
- (Brazil) João Souza

The following players received entry as lucky losers into the singles main draw:

- (Serbia) Miki Janković
- (Kazakhstan) Dmitry Popko

== Doubles main-draw entrants ==
=== Seeds ===
Country	Player	Country	Player	Rank^{1}	Seed
USA	Nicholas Monroe	NZL	Artem Sitak	119	1
BRA	Marcelo Demoliner	AUT	Julian Knowle	131	2
CHI	Julio Peralta	CHI	Hans Podlipnik	131	3
BLR	Aliaksandr Bury	SVK	Igor Zelenay	138	4

- ^{1} Rankings as of May 23, 2015.

=== Other entrants ===
The following pairs received wildcards into the doubles main draw:

- (Czech Republic) Dominik Kellovský / (Czech Republic) Jaroslav Pospíšil
- (Czech Republic) Zdeněk Kolář / (Czech Republic) Matěj Vocel
- (Czech Republic) Michal Konečný / (Czech Republic) Václav Šafránek

== Champions ==
=== Singles ===
- (Kazakhstan) Mikhail Kukushkin def. (Hungary) Márton Fucsovics, 6–1, 6–2

=== Doubles ===
- (Belarus) Aliaksandr Bury / (Slovakia) Igor Zelenay def. (Chile) Julio Peralta / (Chile) Hans Podlipnik, 6–4, 6–4
