= 2018 Moneta Czech Open =

- Date: 4–9 June
- Edition: 25th
- Draw: 32S / 16D
- Surface: Clay
- Location: Prostějov, Czech Republic
- Venue: TK Agrofert Prostějov

Champions

Singles
- (Spain) Jaume Munar

Doubles
- (Ukraine) Denys Molchanov / (Slovakia) Igor Zelenay
- Moneta Czech Open

The 2018 Moneta Czech Open was a professional tennis tournament played on clay courts. It was the 25th edition of the tournament which was part of the 2018 ATP Challenger Tour. It took place in Prostějov, Czech Republic between 4–9 June 2018.

== Singles main-draw entrants ==
=== Seeds ===
Country	Player	Rank^{1}	Seed
ESP	Guillermo García López	67	1
URU	Pablo Cuevas	75	2
ESP	Roberto Carballés Baena	76	3
ARG	Guido Pella	78	4
CZE	Jiří Veselý	80	5
BIH	Mirza Bašić	81	6
KAZ	Mikhail Kukushkin	83	7
MDA	Radu Albot	97	8

- ^{1} Rankings are as of 28 May 2018.

=== Other entrants ===
The following players received wildcards into the singles main draw:

- (Brazil) Thomaz Bellucci
- (Uruguay) Pablo Cuevas
- (Slovakia) Filip Horanský
- (Czech Republic) Václav Šafránek

The following players received entry into the singles main draw as alternates:

- (France) Benjamin Bonzi
- (France) Vincent Millot

The following players received entry from the qualifying draw:

- (Uruguay) Martín Cuevas
- (Italy) Federico Gaio
- (Italy) Gianluca Mager
- (Czech Republic) Jan Šátral

The following player received entry as a lucky loser:

- (Czech Republic) Marek Jaloviec

== Champions ==
=== Singles ===
- (Spain) Jaume Munar def. (Serbia) Laslo Đere 6–1, 6–3.

=== Doubles ===
- (Ukraine) Denys Molchanov / (Slovakia) Igor Zelenay def. (Uruguay) Martín Cuevas / (Uruguay) Pablo Cuevas 4–6, 6–3, [10–7].
