= 2017 UniCredit Czech Open =

- Date: 5–10 June
- Edition: 24th
- Draw: 32S / 16D
- Surface: Clay
- Location: Prostějov, Czech Republic
- Venue: TK Agrofert Prostějov

Champions

Singles
- (Czech Republic) Jiří Veselý

Doubles
- (Argentina) Guillermo Durán / (Argentina) Andrés Molteni
- UniCredit Czech Open

The 2017 UniCredit Czech Open was a professional tennis tournament played on clay courts. It was the 24th edition of the tournament which was part of the 2017 ATP Challenger Tour. It took place in Prostějov, Czech Republic between 5–10 June 2017.

== Singles main-draw entrants ==
=== Seeds ===
Country	Player	Rank^{1}	Seed
SVK	Martin Kližan	50	1
CZE	Jiří Veselý	57	2
GEO	Nikoloz Basilashvili	63	3
KAZ	Mikhail Kukushkin	85	4
ARG	Nicolás Kicker	87	5
MDA	Radu Albot	88	6
SVK	Norbert Gombos	93	7
CZE	Adam Pavlásek	97	8

- ^{1} Rankings are as of 29 May 2017.

=== Other entrants ===
The following players received wildcards into the singles main draw:

- (Latvia) Ernests Gulbis
- (Slovakia) Martin Kližan
- (Czech Republic) Patrik Rikl
- (Spain) Tommy Robredo

The following players received entry into the singles main draw as alternates:

- (El Salvador) Marcelo Arévalo
- (Italy) Lorenzo Giustino
- (Poland) Jerzy Janowicz
- (Chile) Nicolás Jarry
- (Kazakhstan) Dmitry Popko

The following players received entry from the qualifying draw:

- (Sweden) Markus Eriksson
- (France) Maxime Janvier
- (Germany) Kevin Krawietz
- (Czech Republic) Petr Michnev

== Champions ==
=== Singles ===
- (Czech Republic) Jiří Veselý def. (Argentina) Federico Delbonis 5–7, 6–1, 7–5.

=== Doubles ===
- (Argentina) Guillermo Durán / (Argentina) Andrés Molteni def. (Czech Republic) Roman Jebavý / (Chile) Hans Podlipnik Castillo 7–6^{(7–5)}, 6–7^{(5–7)}, [10–6].
