= 2011 UniCredit Czech Open – Doubles =

Doubles
- 2011 UniCredit Czech Open

Final
- Champions: (Ukraine) Sergei Bubka (Spain) Adrián Menéndez
- Runners-up: (Spain) David Marrero (Spain) Rubén Ramírez Hidalgo
- Score: 7–5, 6–2

Events
Singles	Doubles
← 2010 ·	UniCredit Czech Open	· 2012 →

Marcel Granollers and David Marrero were the defending champions but Granollers decided not to participate.
Marrero played alongside Rubén Ramírez Hidalgo. In the final they lost to Sergei Bubka and Adrián Menéndez, 5–7, 2–6.

== Seeds ==
1. (Spain) David Marrero / (Spain) Rubén Ramírez Hidalgo (final)
2. (United States) James Cerretani / (Canada) Adil Shamasdin (first round)
3. (Argentina) Carlos Berlocq / (Spain) Daniel Muñoz-de la Nava (quarterfinals)
4. (Czech Republic) David Škoch / (Slovakia) Igor Zelenay (first round)

== Draw ==
=== Key ===
- Q = Qualifier
- WC = Wild card
- LL = Lucky loser
- Alt = Alternate
- SE = Special exempt
- PR = Protected ranking
- ITF = ITF entry
- JE = Junior exempt
- w/o = Walkover
- r = Retired
- d = Defaulted
- SR = Special ranking

=== Draw ===
First round
1	(Spain) D Marrero (Spain) R Ramírez Hidalgo	7	6
Alt	(Dominican Republic) V Estrella (Brazil) R Hocevar	6^{5}	1
(Spain) D Gimeno Traver (Spain) I Navarro	4	2
WC	(Czech Republic) R Jebavý (Czech Republic) D Lojda	6	6
4	(Czech Republic) D Škoch (Slovakia) I Zelenay	6^{6}	4
(Brazil) R Dutra da Silva (Brazil) F Ferreiro	7	6
(Spain) J Martí (Spain) G Olaso	7	7
(Poland) T Bednarek (Poland) M Kowalczyk	5	6^{5}
(Italy) F Cipolla (United States) M Russell	3	2
(Canada) P-L Duclos (Slovakia) I Klec	6	6
(Spain) A Ramos (Brazil) J Souza	4	7	[4]
3	(Argentina) C Berlocq (Spain) D Muñoz-de la Nava	6	6^{1}	[10]
WC	(Switzerland) G Bastl (Czech Republic) Michal Konečný	3	6^{2}
WC	(Ukraine) S Bubka (Spain) A Menéndez	6	7
(Czech Republic) L Dlouhý (Czech Republic) J Pospíšil	6	6
2	(United States) J Cerretani (Canada) A Shamasdin	1	3

Quarterfinals
1	(Spain) D Marrero (Spain) R Ramírez Hidalgo	5	6	[10]
WC	(Czech Republic) R Jebavý (Czech Republic) D Lojda	7	2	[2]
(Brazil) R Dutra da Silva (Brazil) F Ferreiro	6	6
(Spain) J Martí (Spain) G Olaso	4	2
(Canada) P-L Duclos (Slovakia) I Klec	4	6	[10]
3	(Argentina) C Berlocq (Spain) D Muñoz-de la Nava	6	3	[4]
WC	(Ukraine) S Bubka (Spain) A Menéndez	6	7
(Czech Republic) L Dlouhý (Czech Republic) J Pospíšil	3	6^{4}

Semifinals
1	(Spain) D Marrero (Spain) R Ramírez Hidalgo	4	7	[10]
(Brazil) R Dutra da Silva (Brazil) F Ferreiro	6	6^{1}	[8]
(Canada) P-L Duclos (Slovakia) I Klec	6	2	[7]
WC	(Ukraine) S Bubka (Spain) A Menéndez	4	6	[10]

Final
1	(Spain) D Marrero (Spain) R Ramírez Hidalgo	5	2
WC	(Ukraine) S Bubka (Spain) A Menéndez	7	6
