= 2013 UniCredit Czech Open =

- Date: 3–9 June
- Edition: 20th
- Draw: 32S / 16D
- Prize money: €106,500+H
- Surface: Clay
- Location: Prostějov, Czech Republic
- Venue: TK Agrofert Prostějov

Champions

Singles
- (Czech Republic) Radek Štěpánek

Doubles
- (United States) Nicholas Monroe / (Germany) Simon Stadler
← 2012 ·	UniCredit Czech Open	· 2014 →

The 2013 UniCredit Czech Open was a professional tennis tournament played on clay courts. It was the 20th edition of the tournament, and part of the 2013 ATP Challenger Tour. It took place in Prostějov, Czech Republic between 3 and 9 June 2013.

== Singles main draw entrants ==
=== Seeds ===
Country	Player	Rank^{1}	Seed
GER	Florian Mayer	30	1
CZE	Lukáš Rosol	36	2
FIN	Jarkko Nieminen	38	3
ESP	Albert Montañés	47	4
CZE	Radek Štěpánek	52	5
ESP	Albert Ramos	64	6
ESP	Guillermo García López	79	7
CZE	Jan Hájek	87	8

- ^{1} Rankings are as of May 27, 2013.

=== Other entrants ===
The following players received wildcards into the singles main draw:

- (Germany) Florian Mayer
- (Finland) Jarkko Nieminen
- (Czech Republic) Lukáš Rosol
- (Czech Republic) Radek Štěpánek

The following player received entry using a protected ranking:

- (Dominican Republic) Víctor Estrella

The following players received entry as alternates into the singles main draw:

- (Bosnia and Herzegovina) Damir Džumhur
- (Czech Republic) Dušan Lojda
- (Spain) Jordi Samper-Montaña
- (Slovakia) Marek Semjan

The following players received entry from the qualifying draw:

- (Slovakia) Miloslav Mečíř Jr.
- (Poland) Mateusz Kowalczyk
- (Czech Republic) Ivo Minář
- (Czech Republic) Jaroslav Pospíšil

The following player received entry as a lucky loser:

- (Czech Republic) Michal Konečný

== Doubles main draw entrants ==
=== Seeds ===
Country	Player	Country	Player	Rank^{1}	Seed
USA	Nicholas Monroe	GER	Simon Stadler	164	1
RSA	Rik de Voest	RSA	Raven Klaasen	198	2
POL	Mateusz Kowalczyk	CZE	Lukáš Rosol	232	3
CZE	Jaroslav Pospíšil	SVK	Igor Zelenay	260	4

- ^{1} Rankings as of May 27, 2013.

=== Other entrants ===
The following pairs received wildcards into the doubles main draw:

- (Czech Republic) Marek Jaloviec / (Czech Republic) Václav Šafránek
- (Czech Republic) Michal Konečný / (Czech Republic) Adam Pavlásek
- (Czech Republic) Jaroslav Levinský / (Czech Republic) Dušan Lojda

The following pair received entry as an alternate:

- (Czech Republic) Dominik Kellovský / (Czech Republic) Robert Rumler

== Champions ==
=== Singles ===
- (Czech Republic) Radek Štěpánek def. (Czech Republic) Jiří Veselý, 6–4, 6–2

=== Doubles ===
- (United States) Nicholas Monroe / (Germany) Simon Stadler def. (Poland) Mateusz Kowalczyk / (Czech Republic) Lukáš Rosol, 6–4, 6–4
