= 2015 UniCredit Czech Open =

- Date: 1–7 June
- Edition: 22
- Draw: 32S / 16D
- Prize money: €106,500+H
- Surface: Clay
- Location: Prostějov, Czech Republic
- Venue: TK Agrofert Prostějov

Champions

Singles
- (Czech Republic) Jiří Veselý

Doubles
- (Austria) Julian Knowle / (Austria) Philipp Oswald
- UniCredit Czech Open

The 2015 UniCredit Czech Open was a professional tennis tournament played on clay courts. It was the 22nd edition of the tournament which was part of the 2015 ATP Challenger Tour. It took place in Prostějov, Czech Republic between 1 and 7 June 2015.

== Singles main-draw entrants ==
The tournament enjoyed strong field with several top 100 players. Some players who lost during the first week of French Open were given wild card here.

=== Seeds ===
Country	Player	Rank^{1}	Seed
SVK	Martin Kližan	36	1
CZE	Jiří Veselý	41	2
ESP	Marcel Granollers	57	3
ESP	Pablo Carreño Busta	61	4
COL	Santiago Giraldo	64	5
SRB	Dušan Lajović	67	6
BRA	João Souza	78	7
SLO	Blaž Kavčič	79	8

- ^{1} Rankings are as of May 25, 2015.

=== Other entrants ===
The following players received wildcards into the singles main draw:

- (Colombia) Santiago Giraldo
- (Spain) Marcel Granollers
- (Slovakia) Martin Kližan
- (Czech Republic) Jiří Veselý

The following players received entry as alternates into the singles main draw:

- (Bosnia and Herzegovina) Aldin Šetkić

The following players received entry from the qualifying draw:

- (Belarus) Uladzimir Ignatik
- (Switzerland) Henri Laaksonen
- (Croatia) Nikola Mektić
- (France) Axel Michon

== Doubles main-draw entrants ==
=== Seeds ===
Country	Player	Country	Player	Rank^{1}	Seed
AUT	Julian Knowle	AUT	Philipp Oswald	95	1
USA	Nicholas Monroe	NZL	Artem Sitak	105	2
SWE	Johan Brunström	ISR	Jonathan Erlich	154	3
GER	Martin Emmrich	SWE	Andreas Siljeström	189	4

- ^{1} Rankings as of May 25, 2015.

=== Other entrants ===
The following pairs received wildcards into the doubles main draw:

- (Russia) Evgeny Karlovskiy / (Czech Republic) Michal Konečný
- (Czech Republic) Dominik Kellovský / (Czech Republic) Jan Šátral
- (Czech Republic) David Poljak / (Czech Republic) Václav Šafránek

== Champions ==
=== Singles ===
- (Czech Republic) Jiří Veselý def. (Serbia) Laslo Djere, 6–4, 6–2

=== Doubles ===
- (Austria) Julian Knowle / (Austria) Philipp Oswald def. (Poland) Mateusz Kowalczyk / (Slovakia) Igor Zelenay, 4–6, 6–3, [11–9]
