= 2026 UniCredit Czech Open – Singles =

Singles
- 2026 UniCredit Czech Open

Final
- Champion: (Argentina) Sebastián Báez
- Runner-up: (Slovakia) Alex Molčan
- Score: 6–4, 6–2

Events
Singles	Doubles
- UniCredit Czech Open

Hugo Dellien was the defending champion but chose not to defend his title.

Sebastián Báez won the title after defeating Alex Molčan 6–4, 6–2 in the final.

== Seeds ==
1. (Argentina) Sebastián Báez (champion)
2. (Czech Republic) Vít Kopřiva (second round)
3. (Bosnia and Herzegovina) Damir Džumhur (second round)
4. (Kazakhstan) Alexander Shevchenko (second round)
5. (Czech Republic) Dalibor Svrčina (first round)
6. (Slovakia) Alex Molčan (final)
7. (Spain) Roberto Bautista Agut (first round)
8. (Czech Republic) Zdeněk Kolář (first round)

== Draw ==
Key

- Q = Qualifier
- WC = Wild card
- LL = Lucky loser
- Alt = Alternate
- ITF = ITF entry
- PR = Protected ranking
- SR = Special ranking
- SE = Special exempt
- JE = Junior exempt
- JR = Junior Accelerator Programme entrant
- CO = College Accelerator Programme entrant
- NG = Next Gen Accelerator Program entrant
- w/o = Walkover
- r = Retired
- d = Defaulted

=== Finals ===
Semifinals
1	(Argentina) Sebastián Báez	6	7^{7}
(Spain) Nikolás Sánchez Izquierdo	2	6^{2}
Alt	(Czech Republic) Hynek Bartoň	3	2
6	(Slovakia) Alex Molčan	6	6

Final
1	(Argentina) Sebastián Báez	6	6
6	(Slovakia) Alex Molčan	4	2

=== Top half ===
First round
1	(Argentina) S Báez	6	6
(France) S Gueymard Wayenburg	4	3
(United States) T Boyer	7^{7}	6
(Romania) FC Jianu	6^{5}	4
(Japan) Y Watanuki	6	6^{5}	0^{r}
(Brazil) P Boscardin Dias	1	7^{7}	3
WC	(Czech Republic) M Mrva	5	6	6
5	(Czech Republic) D Svrčina	7	3	4
4	(Kazakhstan) A Shevchenko	7^{7}	4	6
(Italy) R Brancaccio	6^{5}	6	1
(Spain) N Sánchez Izquierdo	6	4	6
(France) L Pavlovic	3	6	3
(Argentina) GA Olivieri	6	1	7^{7}
SE	(Czech Republic) M Krumich	3	6	6^{2}
(Argentina) L Midón	7	6
8	(Czech Republic) Z Kolář	5	1

Second round
1	(Argentina) S Báez	6	6
(United States) T Boyer	2	4
(Brazil) P Boscardin Dias	4	4
WC	(Czech Republic) M Mrva	6	6
4	(Kazakhstan) A Shevchenko	6^{8}	1
(Spain) N Sánchez Izquierdo	7^{10}	6
(Argentina) GA Olivieri	1	2
(Argentina) L Midón	6	6

Quarterfinals
1	(Argentina) S Báez	6	7
WC	(Czech Republic) M Mrva	4	5
(Spain) N Sánchez Izquierdo	6^{6}	6	6
(Argentina) L Midón	7^{8}	3	3

Semifinals
1	(Argentina) S Báez	6	7^{7}
(Spain) N Sánchez Izquierdo	2	6^{2}

=== Bottom half ===
First round
7	(Spain) R Bautista Agut	4	7^{7}	5
Alt	(Czech Republic) H Bartoň	6	6^{5}	7
Q	(Norway) V Durasovic	6^{2}	6	6^{3}
WC	(Slovakia) N Gombos	7^{7}	3	7^{7}
Q	(Japan) T Daniel	7^{7}	6
WC	(Czech Republic) J Forejtek	6^{3}	1
(Spain) M Damas	7^{7}	4	5
3	(Bosnia and Herzegovina) D Džumhur	6^{2}	6	7
6	(Slovakia) A Molčan	6	6
(Hungary) Z Piros	2	3
Q	(Slovakia) M Karol	7^{7}	6
Q	(Italy) CA Caniato	6^{3}	1
(Ukraine) V Sachko	5	6	6
Q	(Czech Republic) J Kumstát	7	0	3
Q	(Slovakia) A Martin	0	4
2	(Czech Republic) V Kopřiva	6	6

Second round
Alt	(Czech Republic) H Bartoň	6	6
WC	(Slovakia) N Gombos	3	4
Q	(Japan) T Daniel	6	4	6
3	(Bosnia and Herzegovina) D Džumhur	4	6	3
6	(Slovakia) A Molčan	6	6
Q	(Slovakia) M Karol	3	4
(Ukraine) V Sachko	6	4	7^{7}
2	(Czech Republic) V Kopřiva	1	6	6^{4}

Quarterfinals
Alt	(Czech Republic) H Bartoň	7^{7}	7
Q	(Japan) T Daniel	6^{4}	5
6	(Slovakia) A Molčan	3	6	6
(Ukraine) V Sachko	6	1	4

Semifinals
Alt	(Czech Republic) H Bartoň	3	2
6	(Slovakia) A Molčan	6	6
