= Czech Extraliga (tennis) =

Tennis tournament in the Czech Republic

- 2017 Czech Extraliga (tennis)

Tournament information
- Event name: Tenisová extraliga
- Founded: 2006
- Editions: 12
- Location: Czech Republic
- Website: http://www.tenisovaextraliga.cz

Czech Extraliga is an annual autumn-winter tennis tournament for clubs from the Czech Republic. I.ČLTK Praha are the current champions.

== Champions by year ==
Year:	Gold medal:	Silver:	Bronze:
2006	TK Neridé	TK Precolor Přerov	(no third place play-off)
2007	TK Agrofert Prostějov	TK Precolor Přerov	TC Realsport Nymburk
2008	TK Agrofert Prostějov	TK Precolor Přerov	TC Realsport Nymburk
In 2009, the contest was not held due to a collision with Davis Cup			
2010	TK Agrofert Prostějov	TK Precolor Plus Přerov	TCF PURUM Mariánské Lázně
2011	TK Agrofert Prostějov	I.ČLTK Praha	(no third place play-off)
2012	TK Agrofert Prostějov	TK Precheza Přerov	LTC Pardubice
2013	TK Agrofert Prostějov	TK Precheza Přerov	(no third place play-off)
2014	TK Agrofert Prostějov	TK Precheza Přerov	(no third place play-off)
2015	TK Agrofert Prostějov	I.ČLTK Praha	(no third place play-off)
2016	TK Agrofert Prostějov	TK Sparta Praha	(no third place play-off)
2017	TK Agrofert Prostějov	TK Sparta Praha	(no third place play-off)
2018	I.ČLTK Praha	TK Agrofert Prostějov	(no third place play-off)
