= 2010 UniCredit Czech Open – Doubles =

Doubles
- 2010 UniCredit Czech Open

Final
- Champions: (Spain) Marcel Granollers (Spain) David Marrero
- Runners-up: (Sweden) Johan Brunström (Netherlands Antilles) Jean-Julien Rojer
- Score: 3–6, 6–4, [10–6]

Events
Singles	Doubles
← 2009 ·	UniCredit Czech Open	· 2011 →

Johan Brunström and Jean-Julien Rojer were the defending champions, but Marcel Granollers and David Marrero defeated them 3–6, 6–4, [10–6] in the final.

== Seeds ==
1. (Sweden) Johan Brunström / (Netherlands Antilles) Jean-Julien Rojer (final)
2. (Spain) Marcel Granollers / (Spain) David Marrero (champions)
3. (Germany) Philipp Marx / (Slovakia) Igor Zelenay (semifinals)
4. (Czech Republic) Leoš Friedl / (Czech Republic) David Škoch (quarterfinals)

== Draw ==
=== Key ===
- Q = Qualifier
- WC = Wild card
- LL = Lucky loser
- Alt = Alternate
- SE = Special exempt
- PR = Protected ranking
- ITF = ITF entry
- JE = Junior exempt
- w/o = Walkover
- r = Retired
- d = Defaulted
- SR = Special ranking

=== Draw ===
First round
1	(Sweden) J Brunström (Netherlands Antilles) J-J Rojer	6	7
(Kazakhstan) A Golubev (Kazakhstan) Y Schukin	4	6^{3}
(South Africa) J Coetzee (South Africa) R de Voest	6	6^{5}	[10]
(Poland) T Bednarek (Poland) M Kowalczyk	3	7	[7]
4	(Czech Republic) L Friedl (Czech Republic) D Škoch	6	7
(Portugal) R Machado (Spain) D Muñoz-De La Nava	3	6^{4}
(United States) J Cerretani (Canada) A Shamasdin	w/o
(Belgium) C Rochus (Belgium) O Rochus
(Thailand) Sa Ratiwatana (Thailand) So Ratiwatana	2	2
WC	(Czech Republic) J Pospíšil (Czech Republic) J Vaněk	6	6
WC	(Czech Republic) R Rumler (Czech Republic) R Urbanek	7	3	[4]
3	(Germany) P Marx (Slovakia) I Zelenay	6^{3}	6	[10]
WC	(Czech Republic) M Jaloviec (Czech Republic) M Konečný	3	1
(India) S Devvarman (Philippines) TC Huey	6	6
(Spain) A Martín (Spain) A Ramos-Viñolas	2	2
2	(Spain) M Granollers (Spain) D Marrero	6	6

Quarterfinals
1	(Sweden) J Brunström (Netherlands Antilles) J-J Rojer	7	1	[10]
(South Africa) J Coetzee (South Africa) R de Voest	6^{4}	6	[5]
4	(Czech Republic) L Friedl (Czech Republic) D Škoch	5	6	[9]
(United States) J Cerretani (Canada) A Shamasdin	7	2	[11]
WC	(Czech Republic) J Pospíšil (Czech Republic) J Vaněk	3	4
3	(Germany) P Marx (Slovakia) I Zelenay	6	6
(India) S Devvarman (Philippines) TC Huey	3	6	[3]
2	(Spain) M Granollers (Spain) D Marrero	6	3	[10]

Semifinals
1	(Sweden) J Brunström (Netherlands Antilles) J-J Rojer	7	7
(United States) J Cerretani (Canada) A Shamasdin	6^{4}	5
3	(Germany) P Marx (Slovakia) I Zelenay	2	2
2	(Spain) M Granollers (Spain) D Marrero	6	6

Finals
1	(Sweden) J Brunström (Netherlands Antilles) J-J Rojer	6	4	[6]
2	(Spain) M Granollers (Spain) D Marrero	3	6	[10]
