= 2013 UniCredit Czech Open – Doubles =

Doubles
- 2013 UniCredit Czech Open

Final
- Champions: (United States) Nicholas Monroe; (Germany) Simon Stadler
- Runners-up: (Poland) Mateusz Kowalczyk; (Czech Republic) Lukáš Rosol
- Score: 6–4, 6–4

Events
Singles	Doubles
- UniCredit Czech Open

Hsieh Cheng-peng and Lee Hsin-han were the defending champions but decided not to participate.
Nicholas Monroe and Simon Stadler defeated Mateusz Kowalczyk and Lukáš Rosol 6–4, 6–4 in the final to win the title.

== Seeds ==
1. (United States) Nicholas Monroe / (Germany) Simon Stadler (champions)
2. (South Africa) Rik de Voest / (South Africa) Raven Klaasen (quarterfinals)
3. (Poland) Mateusz Kowalczyk / (Czech Republic) Lukáš Rosol (final)
4. (Czech Republic) Jaroslav Pospíšil / (Slovakia) Igor Zelenay (withdrew)

== Draw ==
Key

- Q = Qualifier
- WC = Wild card
- LL = Lucky loser
- Alt = Alternate
- ITF = ITF entry
- PR = Protected ranking
- SR = Special ranking
- SE = Special exempt
- JE = Junior exempt
- JR = Junior Accelerator Programme entrant
- CO = College Accelerator Programme entrant
- NG = Next Gen Accelerator Program entrant
- w/o = Walkover
- r = Retired
- d = Defaulted

=== Draw ===
First round

Quarterfinals

Semifinals

Final

1
- (United States) N Monroe
- (Germany) S Stadler
6
6

WC
- (Czech Republic) Marek Jaloviec
- (Czech Republic) V Šafránek
1
1

1
- (United States) N Monroe
- (Germany) S Stadler
6
7

- (Slovakia) K Beck
- (Slovakia) M Semjan
3
7^{7}
[10]

- (Slovakia) K Beck
- (Slovakia) M Semjan
3
5

WC
- (Czech Republic) Michal Konečný
- (Czech Republic) A Pavlásek
6
6^{1}
[6]

1
- (United States) N Monroe
- (Germany) S Stadler
7^{11}
7^{7}

Alt
(Czech Republic) D Kellovský
(Czech Republic) Robert Rumler
6^{3}
2

- (Ukraine) I Sergeyev
- (Chinese Taipei) J Wang
6^{9}
6^{5}

- (Ukraine) I Sergeyev
- (Chinese Taipei) J Wang
7^{7}
6

- (Ukraine) I Sergeyev
- (Chinese Taipei) J Wang
7^{7}
6

- (Kazakhstan) E Korolev
- (Czech Republic) J Mertl
2
2

- (Slovakia) P Červenák
- (Sweden) A Siljeström
6^{5}
4

- (Slovakia) P Červenák
- (Sweden) A Siljeström
6
6

1
- (United States) N Monroe
- (Germany) S Stadler
6
6

- (Spain) A Ramos
- (Spain) A Vivanco-Guzmán
2
3

3
- (Poland) M Kowalczyk
- (Czech Republic) L Rosol
4
4

- (Spain) A Brugués Davi
- (Dominican Republic) V Estrella
6
6

- (Spain) A Brugués Davi
- (Dominican Republic) V Estrella
2
2

- (Czech Republic) J Hájek
- (Czech Republic) J Veselý
3
3

3
- (Poland) M Kowalczyk
- (Czech Republic) L Rosol
6
6

3
- (Poland) M Kowalczyk
- (Czech Republic) L Rosol
6
6

3
- (Poland) M Kowalczyk
- (Czech Republic) L Rosol
6
4
[12]

- (Kazakhstan) A Golubev
- (Italy) S Ianni
1
2

- (Russia) T Gabashvili
- (Ukraine) O Nedovyesov
4
6
[10]

- (Russia) T Gabashvili
- (Ukraine) O Nedovyesov
6
6

- (Russia) T Gabashvili
- (Ukraine) O Nedovyesov
6
7

WC
- (Czech Republic) J Levinský
- (Czech Republic) D Lojda
4
1

2
- (South Africa) R de Voest
- (Brazil) R Klaasen
3
5

2
- (South Africa) R de Voest
- (Brazil) R Klaasen
6
6
