= 2017 UniCredit Czech Open – Singles =

Singles
- 2017 UniCredit Czech Open

Final
- Champion: (Czech Republic) Jiří Veselý
- Runner-up: (Argentina) Federico Delbonis
- Score: 5–7, 6–1, 7–5

Events
Singles	Doubles
- UniCredit Czech Open

Mikhail Kukushkin was the defending champion but lost in the first round to Nicolás Jarry.

Jiří Veselý won the title after defeating Federico Delbonis 5–7, 6–1, 7–5 in the final.

== Seeds ==
1. (Slovakia) Martin Kližan (second round)
2. (Czech Republic) Jiří Veselý (champion)
3. (Georgia (country)) Nikoloz Basilashvili (first round)
4. (Kazakhstan) Mikhail Kukushkin (first round)
5. (Argentina) Nicolás Kicker (quarterfinals)
6. (Moldova) Radu Albot (quarterfinals)
7. (Slovakia) Norbert Gombos (first round)
8. (Czech Republic) Adam Pavlásek (second round)

== Draw ==
Key

- Q = Qualifier
- WC = Wild card
- LL = Lucky loser
- Alt = Alternate
- ITF = ITF entry
- PR = Protected ranking
- SR = Special ranking
- SE = Special exempt
- JE = Junior exempt
- JR = Junior Accelerator Programme entrant
- CO = College Accelerator Programme entrant
- NG = Next Gen Accelerator Program entrant
- w/o = Walkover
- r = Retired
- d = Defaulted

=== Finals ===
Semifinals
Q	(Sweden) Markus Eriksson	5	5
(Argentina) Federico Delbonis	7	7
(United States) Tennys Sandgren	2	2
2	(Czech Republic) Jiří Veselý	6	6

Final
(Argentina) Federico Delbonis	7	1	5
2	(Czech Republic) Jiří Veselý	5	6	7

=== Top half ===
First round
1/WC	(Slovakia) M Kližan	7	6
WC	(Czech Republic) P Rikl	5	2
Q	(Sweden) M Eriksson	7^{7}	6
(Austria) G Melzer	6^{2}	4
Alt	(Italy) L Giustino	5	7^{7}	3
(Brazil) J Souza	7	6^{1}	6
(Argentina) F Bagnis	6^{3}	6	2
6	(Moldova) R Albot	7^{7}	2	6
4	(Kazakhstan) M Kukushkin	5	2
Alt	(Chile) N Jarry	7	6
(Argentina) F Delbonis	6	6
(Russia) E Donskoy	3	1
WC	(Spain) T Robredo	3	6	7^{7}
Alt	(Poland) J Janowicz	6	4	6^{4}
WC	(Latvia) E Gulbis	6	6
7	(Slovakia) N Gombos	4	2

Second round
1/WC	(Slovakia) M Kližan	4	1
Q	(Sweden) M Eriksson	6	6
(Brazil) J Souza	3	3
6	(Moldova) R Albot	6	6
Alt	(Chile) N Jarry	4	5
(Argentina) F Delbonis	6	7
WC	(Spain) T Robredo	w/o
WC	(Latvia) E Gulbis

Quarterfinals
Q	(Sweden) M Eriksson	7	7
6	(Moldova) R Albot	5	5
(Argentina) F Delbonis	6	6
WC	(Spain) T Robredo	3	4

Semifinals
Q	(Sweden) M Eriksson	5	5
(Argentina) F Delbonis	7	7

=== Bottom half ===
First round
5	(Argentina) N Kicker	7^{9}	6
(Argentina) G Andreozzi	6^{7}	2
(Spain) R Carballés Baena	4	6	6
(Spain) Í Cervantes	6	4	4
Q	(Germany) K Krawietz	2	7^{7}	6
(Slovakia) A Martin	6	6^{4}	3
(United States) T Sandgren	6	6
3	(Georgia (country)) N Basilashvili	2	4
8	(Czech Republic) A Pavlásek	6	2	6
Q	(Czech Republic) Petr Michnev	4	6	2
Q	(France) M Janvier	3	3
(Belarus) U Ignatik	6	6
(Hungary) M Fucsovics	2	3
Alt	(El Salvador) M Arévalo	6	6
Alt	(Kazakhstan) D Popko	4	0
2	(Czech Republic) J Veselý	6	6

Second round
5	(Argentina) N Kicker	6	2	6
(Spain) R Carballés Baena	4	6	2
Q	(Germany) K Krawietz	2	1
(United States) T Sandgren	6	6
8	(Czech Republic) A Pavlásek	7	1	6^{4}
(Belarus) U Ignatik	5	6	7^{7}
Alt	(El Salvador) M Arévalo	2	4
2	(Czech Republic) J Veselý	6	6

Quarterfinals
5	(Argentina) N Kicker	6	2	4
(United States) T Sandgren	2	6	6
(Belarus) U Ignatik	6^{3}	1
2	(Czech Republic) J Veselý	7^{7}	6

Semifinals
(United States) T Sandgren	2	2
2	(Czech Republic) J Veselý	6	6
