= 2018 Moneta Czech Open – Doubles =

Doubles
- 2018 Moneta Czech Open

Final
- Champions: (Ukraine) Denys Molchanov (Slovakia) Igor Zelenay
- Runners-up: (Uruguay) Martín Cuevas (Uruguay) Pablo Cuevas
- Score: 4–6, 6–3, [10–7]

Events
Singles	Doubles
- Moneta Czech Open

Guillermo Durán and Andrés Molteni were the defending champions but chose not to defend their title.

Denys Molchanov and Igor Zelenay won the title after defeating Martín and Pablo Cuevas 4–6, 6–3, [10–7] in the final.

== Seeds ==
1. (Czech Republic) Roman Jebavý / (Belarus) Andrei Vasilevski (first round)
2. (Germany) Andre Begemann / (Mexico) Miguel Ángel Reyes-Varela (first round)
3. (Ukraine) Denys Molchanov / (Slovakia) Igor Zelenay (champions)
4. (Belarus) Aliaksandr Bury / (Chinese Taipei) Peng Hsien-yin (first round)

== Draw ==
Key

- Q = Qualifier
- WC = Wild card
- LL = Lucky loser
- Alt = Alternate
- ITF = ITF entry
- PR = Protected ranking
- SR = Special ranking
- SE = Special exempt
- JE = Junior exempt
- JR = Junior Accelerator Programme entrant
- CO = College Accelerator Programme entrant
- NG = Next Gen Accelerator Program entrant
- w/o = Walkover
- r = Retired
- d = Defaulted

First round
1	(Czech Republic) R Jebavý (Belarus) A Vasilevski	3	6	[7]
(Moldova) R Albot (Bosnia and Herzegovina) M Bašić	6	0	[10]
(Uruguay) M Cuevas (Uruguay) P Cuevas	6	6
WC	(Czech Republic) V Kopřiva (Czech Republic) D Poljak	2	1
4	(Belarus) A Bury (Chinese Taipei) H-y Peng	6^{4}	2
(Chinese Taipei) C-p Hsieh (Switzerland) L Margaroli	7^{7}	6
(Czech Republic) Z Kolář (Czech Republic) A Pavlásek	6	6
(Czech Republic) Marek Jaloviec (Czech Republic) V Šafránek	2	2
(Spain) R Carballés Baena (Spain) J Munar	5	6^{6}
(France) G Blancaneaux (France) A Hoang	7	7^{8}
(Italy) S Caruso (Italy) F Gaio	5	4
3	(Ukraine) D Molchanov (Slovakia) I Zelenay	7	6
(Russia) E Karlovskiy (Argentina) R Olivo	6	6
WC	(Czech Republic) Michal Konečný (Czech Republic) M Vrbenský	4	3
WC	(Czech Republic) M Gengel (Czech Republic) D Kellovský	4	7^{7}	[12]
2	(Germany) A Begemann (Mexico) MÁ Reyes-Varela	6	6^{3}	[10]

Quarterfinals
(Moldova) R Albot (Bosnia and Herzegovina) M Bašić	3	4
(Uruguay) M Cuevas (Uruguay) P Cuevas	6	6
(Chinese Taipei) C-p Hsieh (Switzerland) L Margaroli	3	5
(Czech Republic) Z Kolář (Czech Republic) A Pavlásek	6	7
(France) G Blancaneaux (France) A Hoang	4	6	[6]
3	(Ukraine) D Molchanov (Slovakia) I Zelenay	6	3	[10]
(Russia) E Karlovskiy (Argentina) R Olivo	6	6
WC	(Czech Republic) M Gengel (Czech Republic) D Kellovský	2	4

Semifinals
(Uruguay) M Cuevas (Uruguay) P Cuevas	w/o
(Czech Republic) Z Kolář (Czech Republic) A Pavlásek
3	(Ukraine) D Molchanov (Slovakia) I Zelenay	w/o
(Russia) E Karlovskiy (Argentina) R Olivo

Final
(Uruguay) M Cuevas (Uruguay) P Cuevas	6	3	[7]
3	(Ukraine) D Molchanov (Slovakia) I Zelenay	4	6	[10]
