= 2015 UniCredit Czech Open – Doubles =

Doubles
- 2015 UniCredit Czech Open

Final
- Champions: (Austria) Julian Knowle (Austria) Philipp Oswald
- Runners-up: (Poland) Mateusz Kowalczyk (Slovakia) Igor Zelenay
- Score: 4–6, 6–3, [11–9]

Events
Singles	Doubles
- UniCredit Czech Open

Andre Begemann and Lukáš Rosol were the defending champions, but they did not participate this year. When Prostějov tournament started, Rosol was still in play in doubles competition at French Open.

Julian Knowle and Philipp Oswald won the tournament, defeating Mateusz Kowalczyk and Igor Zelenay in the final, 4–6, 6–3, [11–9].

== Seeds ==
1. (Austria) Julian Knowle / (Austria) Philipp Oswald (champions)
2. (United States) Nicholas Monroe / (New Zealand) Artem Sitak (semifinals)
3. (Sweden) Johan Brunström / (Israel) Jonathan Erlich (first round)
4. (Germany) Martin Emmrich / (Sweden) Andreas Siljeström (quarterfinals)

== Draw ==
Key

- Q = Qualifier
- WC = Wild card
- LL = Lucky loser
- Alt = Alternate
- ITF = ITF entry
- PR = Protected ranking
- SR = Special ranking
- SE = Special exempt
- JE = Junior exempt
- JR = Junior Accelerator Programme entrant
- CO = College Accelerator Programme entrant
- NG = Next Gen Accelerator Program entrant
- w/o = Walkover
- r = Retired
- d = Defaulted

First round
1	(Austria) J Knowle (Austria) P Oswald	7^{7}	6
WC	(Czech Republic) D Poljak (Czech Republic) V Šafránek	6^{5}	3
(Kazakhstan) A Golubev (Kazakhstan) A Nedovyesov	6	6
WC	(Czech Republic) D Kellovský (Czech Republic) J Šátral	1	2
4	(Germany) M Emmrich (Sweden) A Siljeström	7^{7}	7^{7}
(Uzbekistan) F Dustov (Poland) A Kapaś	6^{5}	6^{2}
(Belarus) S Betov (Russia) M Elgin	7	6
(Italy) M Cecchinato (Italy) L Vanni	5	2
WC	(Russia) E Karlovskiy (Czech Republic) Michal Konečný	2	6^{4}
(Poland) M Kowalczyk (Slovakia) I Zelenay	6	7^{7}
(Brazil) A Ghem (Brazil) J Souza	6	6
3	(Sweden) J Brunström (Israel) J Erlich	4	4
(Slovakia) N Gombos (Czech Republic) A Pavlásek	6	6^{4}	[10]
(Belarus) A Bury (Germany) F Moser	2	7^{7}	[5]
(Czech Republic) R Jebavý (Czech Republic) J Veselý	4	6	[5]
2	(United States) N Monroe (New Zealand) A Sitak	6	2	[10]

Quarterfinals
1	(Austria) J Knowle (Austria) P Oswald	7	7
(Kazakhstan) A Golubev (Kazakhstan) A Nedovyesov	5	5
4	(Germany) M Emmrich (Sweden) A Siljeström	5	6	[7]
(Belarus) S Betov (Russia) M Elgin	7	4	[10]
(Poland) M Kowalczyk (Slovakia) I Zelenay	6	7^{7}
(Brazil) A Ghem (Brazil) J Souza	1	6^{4}
(Slovakia) N Gombos (Czech Republic) A Pavlásek	6	4	[10]
2	(United States) N Monroe (New Zealand) A Sitak	2	6	[12]

Semifinals
1	(Austria) J Knowle (Austria) P Oswald	7^{7}	6^{6}	[10]
(Belarus) S Betov (Russia) M Elgin	6^{4}	7^{8}	[7]
(Poland) M Kowalczyk (Slovakia) I Zelenay	4	7^{7}	[10]
2	(United States) N Monroe (New Zealand) A Sitak	6	6^{4}	[7]

Final
1	(Austria) J Knowle (Austria) P Oswald	4	6	[11]
(Poland) M Kowalczyk (Slovakia) I Zelenay	6	3	[9]
