= 2013 UniCredit Czech Open – Singles =

Singles
- 2013 UniCredit Czech Open

Final
- Champion: (Czech Republic) Radek Štěpánek
- Runner-up: (Czech Republic) Jiří Veselý
- Score: 6–4, 6–2

Events
Singles	Doubles
- UniCredit Czech Open

Florian Mayer was the defending champion but lost in the second round.
Radek Štěpánek defeated Jiří Veselý in an all-Czech final 6–4, 6–2 to capture the title.

== Seeds ==
1. (Germany) Florian Mayer (second round)
2. (Czech Republic) Lukáš Rosol (quarterfinals)
3. (Finland) Jarkko Nieminen (first round)
4. (Spain) Albert Montañés (quarterfinals)
5. (Czech Republic) Radek Štěpánek (champion)
6. (Spain) Albert Ramos (quarterfinals)
7. (Spain) Guillermo García López (first round)
8. (Czech Republic) Jan Hájek (quarterfinals)

== Draw ==
Key

- Q = Qualifier
- WC = Wild card
- LL = Lucky loser
- Alt = Alternate
- ITF = ITF entry
- PR = Protected ranking
- SR = Special ranking
- SE = Special exempt
- JE = Junior exempt
- JR = Junior Accelerator Programme entrant
- CO = College Accelerator Programme entrant
- NG = Next Gen Accelerator Program entrant
- w/o = Walkover
- r = Retired
- d = Defaulted

=== Finals ===
Semifinals
(Russia) Teymuraz Gabashvili	5	7^{7}	5
5/WC	(Czech Republic) Radek Štěpánek	7	6^{5}	7
(Germany) Peter Gojowczyk	2	7	2
(Czech Republic) Jiří Veselý	6	5	6

Final
5/WC	(Czech Republic) Radek Štěpánek	6	6
(Czech Republic) Jiří Veselý	4	2

=== Top half ===
First round
1/WC	(Germany) F Mayer	6	6
(Chinese Taipei) J Wang	4	1
Q	(Slovakia) M Mečíř	2	1
(Russia) T Gabashvili	6	6
Alt	(Bosnia and Herzegovina) D Džumhur	6^{3}	6	6
Alt	(Spain) J Samper-Montaña	7^{7}	4	1
Q	(Czech Republic) I Minář	6^{5}	3
8	(Czech Republic) J Hájek	7^{7}	6
4	(Spain) A Montañés	7^{7}	6
(Slovakia) K Beck	6^{0}	2
Alt	(Slovakia) M Semjan	5	6	6
(Slovakia) J Kovalík	7	2	4
(Kazakhstan) E Korolev	1	3
(Czech Republic) J Mertl	6	6
PR	(Dominican Republic) V Estrella	4	4
5/WC	(Czech Republic) R Štěpánek	6	6

Second round
1/WC	(Germany) F Mayer	4	5
(Russia) T Gabashvili	6	7
Alt	(Bosnia and Herzegovina) D Džumhur	3	6	6^{4}
8	(Czech Republic) J Hájek	6	3	7^{7}
4	(Spain) A Montañés	6	6
Alt	(Slovakia) M Semjan	1	4
(Czech Republic) J Mertl	1	7^{7}	4
5/WC	(Czech Republic) R Štěpánek	6	6^{5}	6

Quarterfinals
(Russia) T Gabashvili	6	6
8	(Czech Republic) J Hájek	4	3
4	(Spain) A Montañés	3	4
5/WC	(Czech Republic) R Štěpánek	6	6

Semifinals
(Russia) T Gabashvili	5	7^{7}	5
5/WC	(Czech Republic) R Štěpánek	7	6^{5}	7

=== Bottom half ===
First round
6	(Spain) A Ramos	6	6
(Slovakia) P Červenák	2	2
(Kazakhstan) A Golubev	6	6
LL	(Czech Republic) Michal Konečný	2	2
(Ukraine) I Sergeyev	6	6
(South Africa) R de Voest	1	4
(Germany) P Gojowczyk	7^{7}	6
3/WC	(Finland) J Nieminen	6^{5}	4
7	(Spain) G García López	2	2
(Czech Republic) J Veselý	6	6
(United States) J Sock	7^{10}	6
(Ukraine) O Nedovyesov	6^{8}	3
(Spain) A Brugués Davi	3	0
Alt	(Czech Republic) D Lojda	6	6
Q	(Poland) M Kowalczyk	3	6	3
2/WC	(Czech Republic) L Rosol	6	3	6

Second round
6	(Spain) A Ramos	6	6
(Kazakhstan) A Golubev	1	3
(Ukraine) I Sergeyev	4	0
(Germany) P Gojowczyk	6	6
(Czech Republic) J Veselý	4	6	7^{7}
(United States) J Sock	6	4	6^{4}
Alt	(Czech Republic) D Lojda	5	3
2/WC	(Czech Republic) L Rosol	7	6

Quarterfinals
6	(Spain) A Ramos	3	6	4
(Germany) P Gojowczyk	6	1	6
(Czech Republic) J Veselý	5	6	7^{7}
2/WC	(Czech Republic) L Rosol	7	4	6^{4}

Semifinals
(Germany) P Gojowczyk	2	7	2
(Czech Republic) J Veselý	6	5	6
