= 2011 UniCredit Czech Open =

- Date: May 30 – June 5
- Edition: 18th
- Location: Prostějov, Czech Republic
- Venue: TK Agrofert Prostějov

Champions

Singles
- (Kazakhstan) Yuri Schukin

Doubles
- (Ukraine) Sergei Bubka / (Spain) Adrián Menéndez
- UniCredit Czech Open

The 2011 UniCredit Czech Open was a professional tennis tournament played on outdoor red clay courts. It was part of the 2011 ATP Challenger Tour. It took place in Prostějov, Czech Republic between 30 May and 5 June 2011.

== ATP entrants ==
=== Seeds ===
Nationality	Player	Ranking*	Seeding
RUS	Mikhail Youzhny	13	1
ESP	Tommy Robredo	31	2
ITA	Andreas Seppi	51	3
ESP	Daniel Gimeno Traver	55	4
TPE	Lu Yen-hsun	56	5
CZE	Radek Štěpánek	57	6
ARG	Carlos Berlocq	69	7
ITA	Filippo Volandri	73	8

- Rankings are as of May 23, 2011.

=== Other entrants ===
The following players received wildcards into the singles main draw:

- (Chinese Taipei) Lu Yen-hsun
- (Spain) Tommy Robredo
- (Italy) Andreas Seppi
- (Russia) Mikhail Youzhny

The following players received entry from the qualifying draw:

- (Czech Republic) Roman Jebavý
- (Kazakhstan) Evgeny Korolev
- (Spain) Adrián Menéndez
- (Czech Republic) Roman Vögeli

== Champions ==
=== Singles ===
(Kazakhstan) Yuri Schukin def. (Italy) Flavio Cipolla, 6–4, 4–6, 6–0

=== Doubles ===
(Ukraine) Sergei Bubka / (Spain) Adrián Menéndez def. (Spain) David Marrero / (Spain) Rubén Ramírez Hidalgo, 7–5, 6–2
