= 2011 UniCredit Czech Open – Singles =

Singles
- 2011 UniCredit Czech Open

Final
- Champion: (Kazakhstan) Yuri Schukin
- Runner-up: (Italy) Flavio Cipolla
- Score: 6–4, 4–6, 6–0

Events
Singles	Doubles
- UniCredit Czech Open

Jan Hájek was the defending champion, but he was eliminated by Mikhail Youzhny in the second round.
Yuri Schukin won this title, after defeating Flavio Cipolla 6–4, 4–6, 6–0 in the final.

== Seeds ==
1. (Russia) Mikhail Youzhny (quarterfinals, retired due to left foot injury)
2. (Spain) Tommy Robredo (withdrew)
3. (Italy) Andreas Seppi (quarterfinals)
4. (Spain) Daniel Gimeno-Traver (first round)
5. (Chinese Taipei) Lu Yen-hsun (first round)
6. (Czech Republic) Radek Štěpánek (semifinals)
7. (Argentina) Carlos Berlocq (first round)
8. (Italy) Filippo Volandri (second round)

== Draw ==
Key

- Q = Qualifier
- WC = Wild card
- LL = Lucky loser
- Alt = Alternate
- ITF = ITF entry
- PR = Protected ranking
- SR = Special ranking
- SE = Special exempt
- JE = Junior exempt
- JR = Junior Accelerator Programme entrant
- CO = College Accelerator Programme entrant
- NG = Next Gen Accelerator Program entrant
- w/o = Walkover
- r = Retired
- d = Defaulted

=== Finals ===
Semifinals
(Kazakhstan) Yuri Schukin	3	6	6
6	(Czech Republic) Radek Štěpánek	6	3	4
(Spain) Daniel Muñoz-de la Nava	5	6^{9}
(Italy) Flavio Cipolla	7	7

Final
(Kazakhstan) Yuri Schukin	6	4	6
(Italy) Flavio Cipolla	4	6	0

=== Top half ===
First round
1/WC	(Russia) M Youzhny	7	3	7
Alt	(Slovakia) M Semjan	5	6	5
(United States) M Russell	4	5
(Czech Republic) J Hájek	6	7
(Russia) K Kravchuk	5	0
(Kazakhstan) Y Schukin	7	6
(Brazil) R Dutra da Silva	4	2
8	(Italy) F Volandri	6	6
3/WC	(Italy) A Seppi	7	6
(Czech Republic) D Lojda	5	2
(Czech Republic) I Minář	0	3
(Spain) I Navarro	6	6
(Czech Republic) L Rosol	6	6
Q	(Czech Republic) R Jebavý	3	3
Alt	(Slovakia) I Klec	5	2
6	(Czech Republic) R Štěpánek	7	6

Second round
1/WC	(Russia) M Youzhny	6	6
(Czech Republic) J Hájek	3	3
(Kazakhstan) Y Schukin	6	6
8	(Italy) F Volandri	4	1
3/WC	(Italy) A Seppi	6	2	6
(Spain) I Navarro	1	6	4
(Czech Republic) L Rosol	5	2
6	(Czech Republic) R Štěpánek	7	6

Quarterfinals
1/WC	(Russia) M Youzhny	6	1^{r}
(Kazakhstan) Y Schukin	1	4
3/WC	(Italy) A Seppi	5	4
6	(Czech Republic) R Štěpánek	7	6

Semifinals
(Kazakhstan) Y Schukin	3	6	6
6	(Czech Republic) R Štěpánek	6	3	4

=== Bottom half ===
First round
7	(Argentina) C Berlocq	2	6^{2}
(Brazil) J Souza	6	7
(Dominican Republic) V Estrella	3	6	6
Q	(Czech Republic) R Vögeli	6	3	4
(Czech Republic) J Pospíšil	6	7
(Spain) R Ramírez Hidalgo	3	6^{5}
(Spain) D Muñoz-de la Nava	3	6	6
4	(Spain) D Gimeno-Traver	6	3	3
5/WC	(Chinese Taipei) Y-h Lu	2	4
(Spain) A Ramos	6	6
Q	(Kazakhstan) E Korolev	7	6
Q	(Spain) A Menéndez	6^{4}	4
(Ukraine) S Bubka	7	0	3
(Italy) F Cipolla	5	6	6
(Spain) G Olaso	7	6
LL	(Brazil) R Hocevar	6^{6}	2

Second round
(Brazil) J Souza	6	6^{7}	4
(Dominican Republic) V Estrella	3	7	6
(Czech Republic) J Pospíšil	2	3
(Spain) D Muñoz-de la Nava	6	6
(Spain) A Ramos	3	3
Q	(Kazakhstan) E Korolev	6	6
(Italy) F Cipolla	6	6
(Spain) G Olaso	4	4

Quarterfinals
(Dominican Republic) V Estrella	7	5	3
(Spain) D Muñoz-de la Nava	5	7	6
Q	(Kazakhstan) E Korolev	4	0^{r}
(Italy) F Cipolla	6	2

Semifinals
(Spain) D Muñoz-de la Nava	5	6^{9}
(Italy) F Cipolla	7	7
