= Martin Kližan =

Slovak tennis player

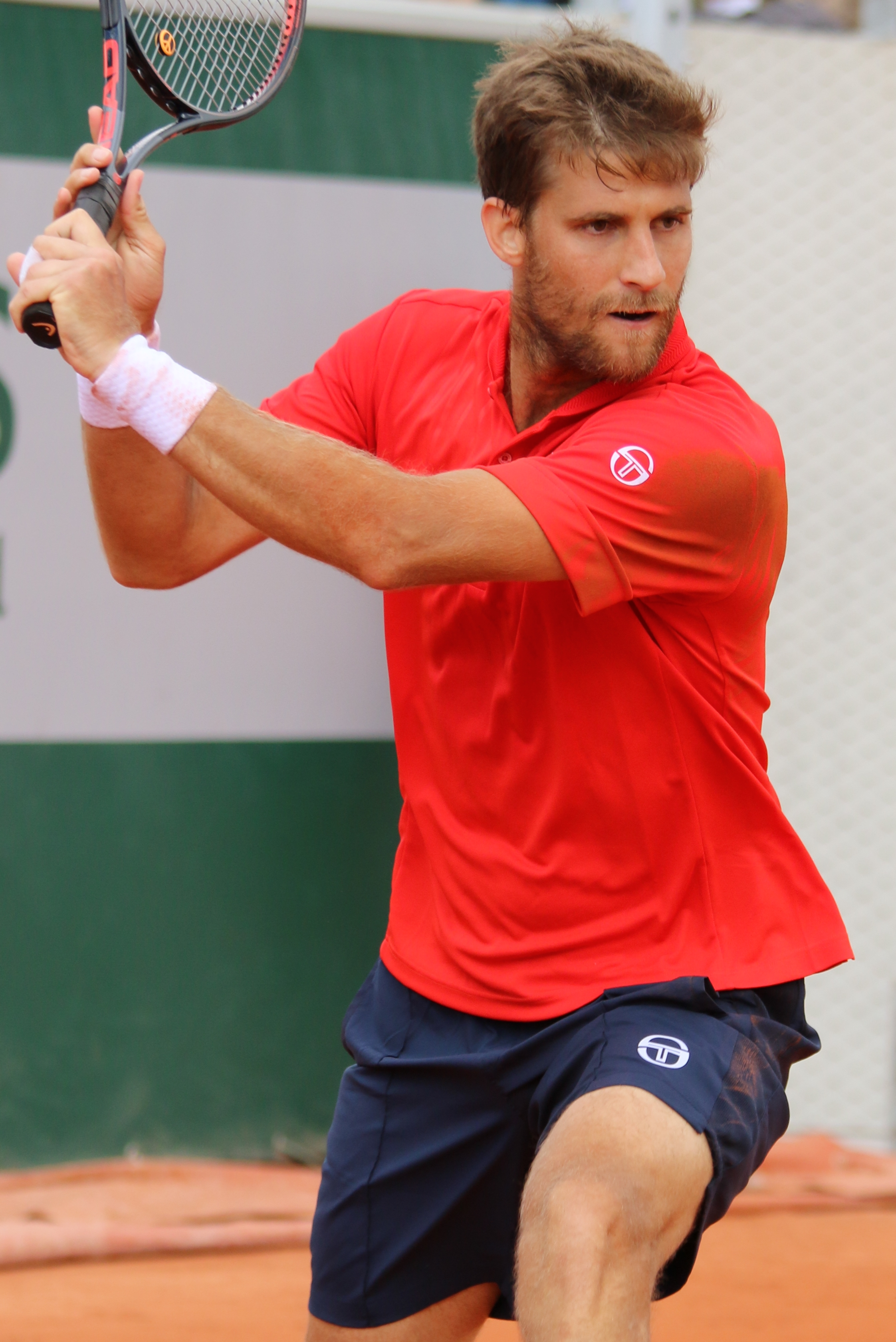
- Kližan at the 2019 French Open
- Country (sports): Slovakia
- Residence: Bratislava, Slovakia
- Born: 11 July 1989 (age 37) Bratislava, Czechoslovakia
- Height: 1.91 m (6 ft 3 in)
- Turned pro: 2007
- Retired: 2025
- Plays: Left-handed (two-handed backhand)
- Coach: Martin Hromec
- Prize money: US $5,575,281

Singles
- Career record: 149–154
- Career titles: 6
- Highest ranking: No. 24 (27 April 2015)

Grand Slam singles results
- Australian Open: 3R (2014)
- French Open: 3R (2014, 2019)
- Wimbledon: 2R (2012)
- US Open: 4R (2012)

Other tournaments
- Olympic Games: 1R (2012)

Doubles
- Career record: 38–58
- Career titles: 4
- Highest ranking: No. 73 (4 May 2015)

Grand Slam doubles results
- Australian Open: 2R (2013)
- French Open: 1R (2013, 2014, 2015, 2016, 2017, 2019)
- Wimbledon: 2R (2014)
- US Open: 1R (2012, 2013, 2014, 2015, 2016)

Grand Slam mixed doubles results
- Wimbledon: 3R (2014)

Martin Kližan (Slovak pronunciation: [ˈmartiŋ ˈkliʐan]; born 11 July 1989) is a Slovak former professional tennis player. He has a career-high singles ranking of world No. 24, achieved on 27 April 2015, and No. 73 in doubles, achieved on 4 May 2015. He won the 2006 French Open Junior singles title.

== Career ==
=== Junior career ===
In 2005, he won the European Junior Championship in the under-16 category, in both singles and doubles. In doubles, his partner was compatriot Andrej Martin. Kližan then went on to win the 2006 French Open boys' singles competition.

As a young man, Kližan posted a 54–21 win–loss record in singles and 58–18 in doubles. He reached the boys' No. 1 combined world ranking on 1 January 2007.

=== 2007: Turned professional ===
Kližan turned pro in 2007.

=== 2010–11: Top 100 debut ===
In 2010, Kližan qualified for the US Open. In his first main-draw Grand Slam tournament appearance, he lost to former world No. 1 Juan Carlos Ferrero in the first round. Later in the year, Kližan won his first Challenger tournament as a wildcard in his hometown of Bratislava at the Slovak Open. He would subsequently break into the top 100 on 12 September 2011.

=== 2012: Best major fourth round run at US Open, Top 30 ===
In his Wimbledon debut, Kližan defeated Juan Ignacio Chela 11–9 in the fifth set in the first round, before losing in five sets to Viktor Troicki in the second round, despite being 2–1 up in sets. He competed in men's singles at the 2012 Summer Olympics, as well as the men's doubles with Lukáš Lacko.

At the 2012 US Open, Kližan advanced to the fourth round of a Grand Slam for the first time in his career, upsetting fifth seeded Jo-Wilfried Tsonga in the second round in four sets.

=== 2013: Loss of form ===
Coming into 2013, Kližan was expected to reach at least the top 20. However, with his inconsistent nature, Kližan alternated good results with very bad ones. After first-round losses at the start of the season, he reached the quarterfinals in Rotterdam. Due to this result, he reached his career-high singles ranking of World No. 26.

He went on with poor results until the semifinals in Casablanca. At the 2013 French Open, he lost in the second round against eventual champion Rafael Nadal, despite winning the first set. Subsequently, he participated in a Challenger tournament in Caltanissetta, Italy, where Kližan suffered a shocking loss to non-ranked player Pablo Carreño Busta in the first round. Afterwards, Klizan returned to the main tour and after reaching the quarterfinals in Umag and winning his first-round match in Montreal against Thomaz Bellucci, lost in the first round of every tournament, peaking at the 2013 US Open, where he lost to Donald Young. He did not play for six weeks due to a wrist injury and withdrew from St. Petersburg, where he was the defending champion.

=== 2014: Return to form, Australian and French Open third rounds ===
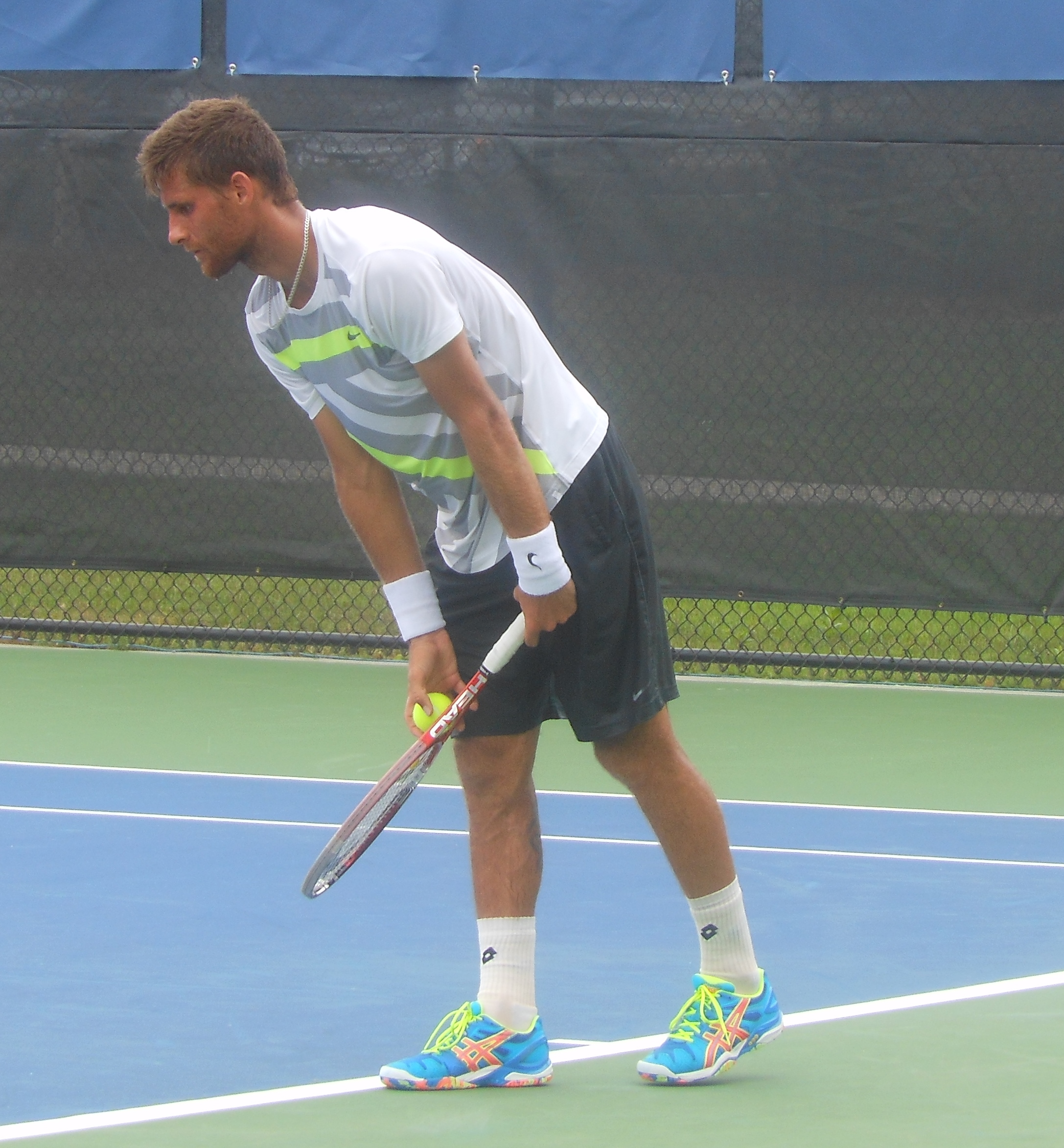
Kližan at the 2014 Winston-Salem Open

Kližan started the year with a first-round loss at the Nouméa, New Caledonia Challenger tournament to World No. 258 Kimmer Coppejans. After a poor start of the year, he found very good subsequent form at the Australian Open. Starting from qualifying, his achieved his best result in Australia by reaching the third round as a lucky loser, where he lost to another lucky loser: Stéphane Robert.

He continued his good form at the 500 tournament in Rio. Starting again from qualifying, he reached the second round. This result saw Kližan return to the top 100 of the rankings at World No. 97. In São Paulo, Kližan reached the quarterfinals, where he lost to semifinalist Thomaz Bellucci.

Starting from qualifying once more, Kližan surprisingly won the BMW Open, beating Mikhail Youzhny and Tommy Haas en route to the final, where he defeated top seeded Fabio Fognini. It was the second final and second title in Kližan's main-circuit career. He won both titles beating Fognini in the final.

At Roland Garros, Kližan had his best French Open result to date. He reached the third round after defeating World No. 11 Kei Nishikori in straight sets and Robin Haase.

At the beginning of the grass season, he reached the quarterfinals, where he was beaten by Richard Gasquet in Eastbourne. At Wimbledon, he lost in the first round in four sets to former champion Rafael Nadal.

At the China Open, Kližan got revenge by turning the tables on Nadal, defeating him in the quarterfinals.

=== 2015–16: Top 25, two ATP 500 titles ===
Kližan played at the 2015 Australian Open as the 32nd seed but retired from his second-round match against João Sousa.

Kližan won his third ATP doubles title at the 2015 Rio Open, partnering Philipp Oswald. He played two singles matches and also the doubles match in a Davis Cup tie against Slovenia, which Slovakia won 5–0. Originally, the Slovak nominations were announced without Kližan, but he later changed his decision and decided to partake in the tie. In April, Kližan won his third ATP title in Casablanca, defeating Daniel Gimeno Traver in the final. In Barcelona, he reached the semifinals, where he lost to eventual champion Kei Nishikori.

At the 2015 French Open, Kližan defeated Frances Tiafoe in the first round and lost to Gilles Simon in the second round. He later received wildcard for the main draw of the Challenger in Prostějov. Kližan defeated fellow Slovak player Norbert Gombos in the first round, but lost in the second round to young Serbian player Laslo Djere.

In July, Kližan again played Davis Cup for Slovakia and won both his matches. He subsequently won his fourth title in Rotterdam, beating Gaël Monfils in the final, coming back from a set down. On his way to the title, Kližan saved eight match points (five against Roberto Bautista Agut and three against Nicolas Mahut).

Kližan lifted his second ATP 500 trophy at the 2016 German Open, defeating Pablo Cuevas in the final in straight sets.

=== 2017: Injuries, Four ATP quarterfinals, out of top 100 ===
Kližan started the season with in Chennai, where he received a bye in the first round and lost in the second round to Aljaž Bedene. This was followed by a first-round loss in Sydney, where he retired with a foot injury. He then lost a tight, five-set match against No. 4 seed Stan Wawrinka at the Australian Open.

Kližan reached the quarterfinals in both Sofia and Rotterdam. As he was the defending champion in Rotterdam, his ranking dropped substantially after these tournaments. In Acapulco, Kližan lost in the first round to top seed Novak Djokovic.

At the 2017 BNP Paribas Open, Kližan lost in the second round to Pablo Cuevas and in the first round of Miami in first round to Benoît Paire. This was followed by a first-round loss in Marrakesh to qualifier Laslo Djere. Kližan qualified for the main draw of the 2017 Monte-Carlo Rolex Masters, but he lost to Nicolás Almagro in the first round, after receiving two game penalties for unsportsmanlike conduct in the third set.

In Budapest, Kližan defeated two qualifiers: Maximilian Marterer and Bjorn Fratangelo, before losing to top seed and eventual winner Lucas Pouille in the quarterfinals. In Munich, Kližan defeated Nicolás Kicker and Mischa Zverev, before losing to Chung Hyeon in the quarterfinals. At the 2017 French Open, Kližan defeated Laurent Lokoli in the first round before losing to World No. 1 Andy Murray. This was followed by two Challengers, where he played as the top seed. In Prostějov, Kližan lost in the second round to qualifier Markus Eriksson (ranked 476 at the time). In Poprad-Tatry, he lost to Roberto Carballés Baena in the quarterfinals.

Kližan played one grass tournament before Wimbledon. In Antalya, he retired in his first-round match against Marsel İlhan. At Wimbledon, Kližan retired in the first round again, this time he played Novak Djokovic. After the points from winning the 2016 German Open were deducted, Kližan dropped out of the top 100.

=== 2018: Sixth ATP title ===
Kližan reached the round of 16 at the Sofia Open, where he was defeated by Stan Wawrinka in three sets. In March, Kližan won the Indian Wells Challenger tournament. At the Barcelona Open later in the year, he beat Novak Djokovic for the first time in five encounters (1–4). Kližan later lost in quarterfinals to Rafael Nadal. In Munich, Kližan qualified into the main draw and reached the quarterfinals, where he lost to Chung Hyeon.

Kližan qualified for the main draw at Roland Garros, where he lost in the second round to Gaël Monfils. During the grass season, Kližan did not play at any ATP tournaments.

Coming into the 2018 Generali Open Kitzbühel with a career record of 127–128 in singles, Kližan ensured his record would have more wins than losses by not only reaching the semifinals, but by also going on and winning the whole tournament. Kližan did just that, defeating Denis Istomin in the final, top seed Dominic Thiem as well as Dušan Lajović in the quarterfinals, against whom he saved two match points. Kližan and Thiem met again in St. Petersburg Open final, this time Thiem won. It was the first loss in seven finals for Kližan in an ATP World Tour final.

=== 2019: French Open third round ===
In Sydney, Kližan lost in the second round to Andreas Seppi. Kližan then lost in the first round of Australian Open to Jo-Wilfried Tsonga.

Kližan played for Slovakia in Davis Cup match against Canada, he won one of his singles rubbers and also in doubles alongside Filip Polášek, but Slovakia eventually lost 2–3. In Sofia, Kližan reached quarterfinals, where he lost to the eventual champion Daniil Medvedev.

=== 2021: Retirement ===
Martin Kližan's retirement to be announced after Wimbledon was reported on 2 June 2021, according to information published by the Slovak Tennis Federation. He played his last match at Wimbledon on 22 June 2021.

=== 2023–25: Comeback, second retirement ===
Since his retirement, Kližan ran in the local elections for Mayor of Petržalka and applied for the position of president of the Slovak Tennis Association, both of which failed. During the free time, he was watching his previous tennis matches. After a re-watch of the 2014 China Open quarterfinals win against Nadal, Kližan started having ideas about a comeback to professional tennis.

In September 2023, he started preparing and training at the IMG Academy. In December, Kližan made his return for the qualifying at the M15 ITF tournament in Antalya.

In 2024, Kližan won four ITF tournaments: in Heraklion, Telde, Valldoreix and in Reggio Emilia. As a result he returned to the top 400 at world No. 369 on 24 June 2024 and to the top 350 on 5 August 2024. In December Kližan broke into the worlds top 300. He finished the year at world No. 291.

In February 2025, Kližan qualified into the main draw of the ATP tournament in Bucharest. He lost in the first round to Francisco Comesaña. In May 2025, Kližan announced his definitive retirement from professional tennis, citing the lack of motivation. He has since started playing padel, with his debut being on the FIP Euro Padel Cup 2025.

== Career statistics ==
=== Grand Slam tournament performance timeline ===
Key
W	F	SF	QF	#R	RR	Q#	DNQ	A	NH

(W) winner; (F) finalist; (SF) semifinalist; (QF) quarterfinalist; (#R) rounds 4, 3, 2, 1; (RR) round-robin stage; (Q#) qualification round; (DNQ) did not qualify; (A) absent; (NH) not held; (SR) strike rate (events won / competed); (W–L) win–loss record.
To avoid confusion and double counting, these charts are updated at the conclusion of a tournament or when the player's participation has ended.

Tournament	2007	2008	2009	2010	2011	2012	2013	2014	2015	2016	2017	2018	2019	2020	2021	SR	W–L	Win %
Australian Open	A	A	A	Q1	A	A	1R	3R	2R	1R	1R	A	1R	Q1	Q1	0 / 6	3–6	33%
French Open	Q2	A	A	Q3	A	2R	2R	3R	2R	1R	2R	2R	3R	Q2	Q1	0 / 8	9–8	53%
Wimbledon	A	A	A	A	Q1	2R	1R	1R	1R	1R	1R	A	1R	NH	Q1	0 / 7	1–7	13%
US Open	A	A	A	1R	A	4R	1R	2R	2R	1R	A	A	1R	A	A	0 / 7	5–7	45%
Win–loss	0–0	0–0	0–0	0–1	0–0	5–3	1–4	5–4	3–4	0–4	1–3	1–1	2–4	0–0	0–0	0 / 28	18–28	40%

=== Records ===
Event	Years	Record accomplished	Players matched
ATP Tour	2012–18	First six tournament finals won	Ernests Gulbis; Ugo Humbert

== Criticism ==
In January 2022, Martin Kližan faced criticism after publishing a post on Instagram in which he attacked the sexual orientation of former tennis player Martina Navrátilová, following her statement towards tennis player Novak Djokovic regarding his refusal to be vaccinated. Kližan spoke against Navrátilová and called her "the most famous tennis lesbian" and said with contempt for her sexual orientation: "I do not know if Mrs. Navrátilová is aware of how the most important process in the world works, namely the process of human race reproduction, if by any chance she reads this post, then, Mrs. Navrátilová, a woman with a woman and a man with a man cannot conceive a newborn."

In February 2025, he posted a selfie on social media from a lunch with Daniel Bombic, a well-known figure from the conspiracy scene accused of spreading neo-Nazism. Kližan faced a wave of criticism, and Instagram subsequently removed the photo.

Awards
Preceded by (Canada) Milos Raonic	ATP Newcomer of the Year; 2012	Succeeded by (Czech Republic) Jiří Veselý (ATP Star of Tomorrow)
