= TK Agrofert Prostějov =

Tennis club in Prostějov, Czech Republic

- Formation: 1900; 126 years ago
- Purpose: Sport
- Location: Prostějov, Czech Republic
- Coordinates: 49.4813°N 17.1005°E
- Chairman: Miroslav Černošek
- Website: tkagrofert.cz

TK Agrofert Prostějov is a tennis club and training center located in Prostějov, Czech Republic. It is one of the most prestigious tennis clubs in the country.

== History ==
The club was founded in 1900. In 1990, Miroslav Černošek became the president of the club.

Since 1994, the club has hosted the Czech Open on the ATP Challenger Tour.

== Notable players ==
- Michaela Bayerlová
- Sára Bejlek
- Tomáš Berdych
- Norbert Gombos
- Petra Holubová
- Viktória Hrunčáková
- Zdeněk Kolář
- Vít Kopřiva
- Barbora Krejčíková
- Petra Kvitová
- Jiří Lehečka
- Tomáš Macháč
- Florian Mayer
- Jakub Menšík
- Maxim Mrva
- Linda Nosková
- Jiří Novák
- Adam Pavlásek
- Karolína Plíšková
- Lukáš Rosol
- Lucie Šafářová
- Václav Šafránek
- Kateřina Siniaková
- Tereza Smitková
- Radek Štěpánek
- Julie Štruplová
- Barbora Strýcová
- Dalibor Svrčina
- Jiří Veselý
