= Czech Open (tennis) =

Tennis tournament in Prostějov, Czech Republic

UniCredit Czech Open
- 2026 UniCredit Czech Open

ATP Challenger Tour
- Event name: UniCredit Czech Open
- Location: Prostějov, Czech Republic
- Venue: TK Agrofert Prostějov
- Category: ATP Challenger Tour 100
- Surface: Clay
- Draw: 32S/29Q/16D
- Prize money: €145,250+H
- Website: Website

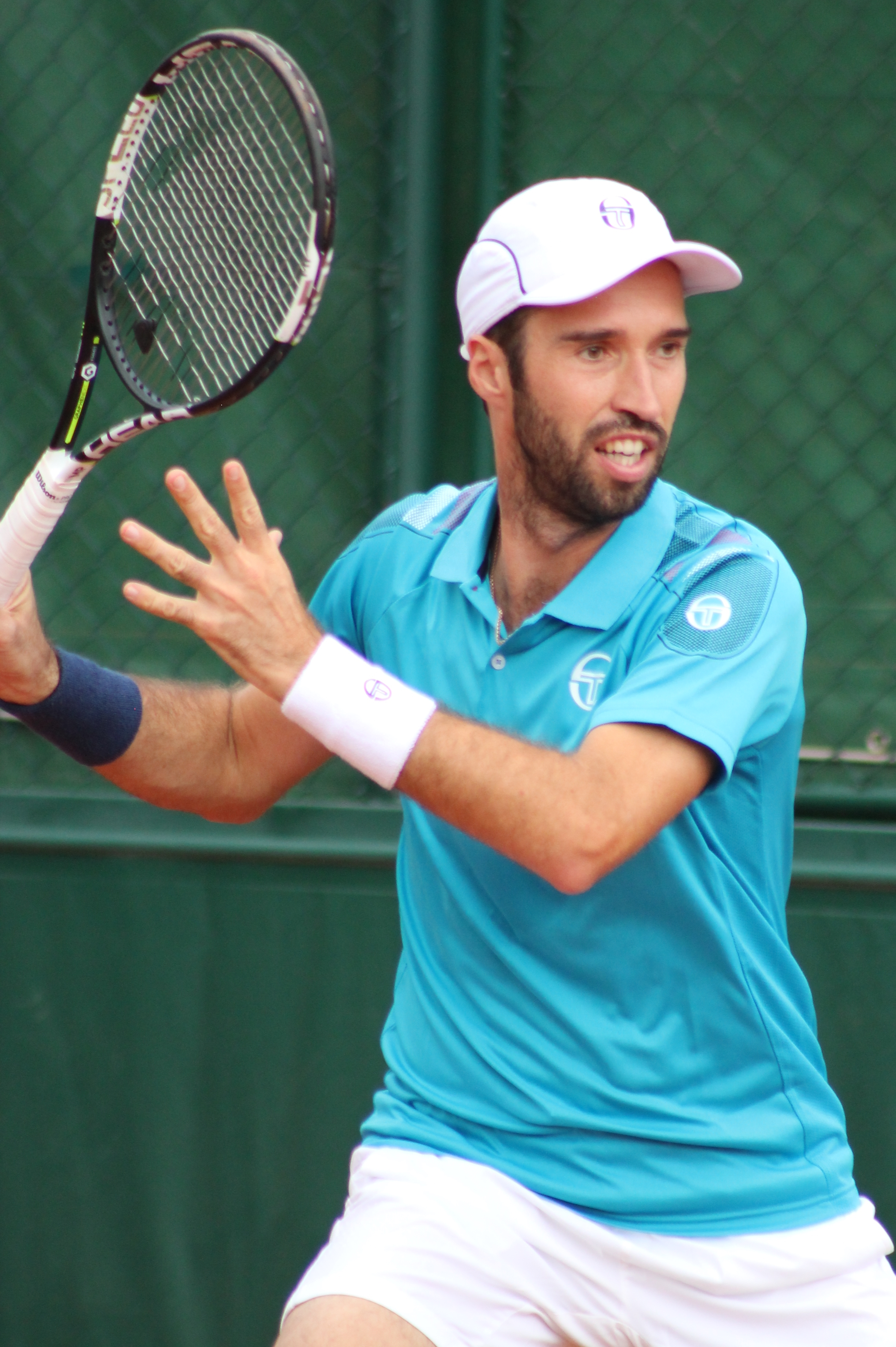
2016 winner Mikhail Kukushkin, who became the second Kazakhstani player to win the title, following Yuri Schukin's victory in 2011

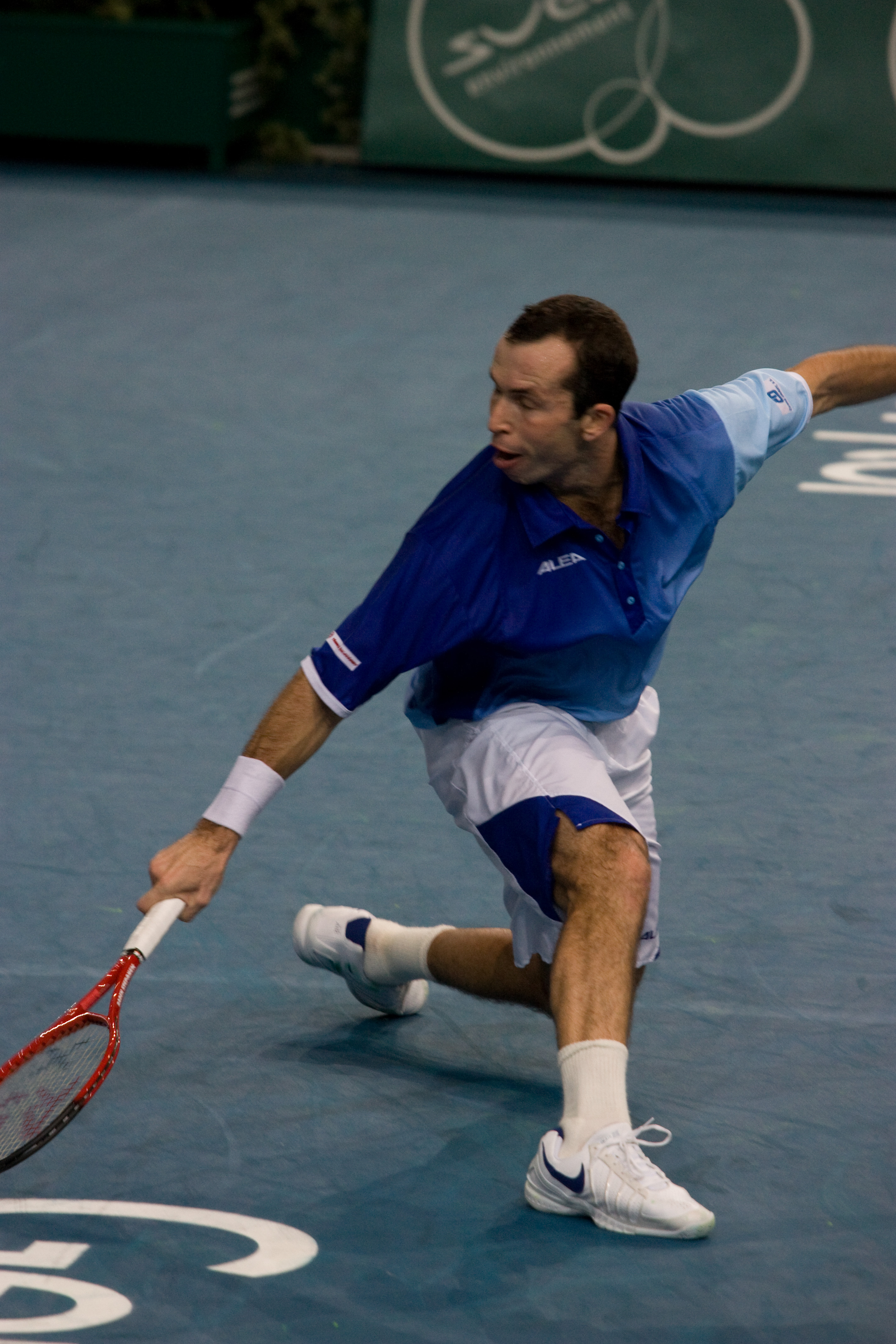
2003 and 2004 winner Radek Štěpánek was one of only three Czech winners in the singles event, along with Ulihrach and Hájek.

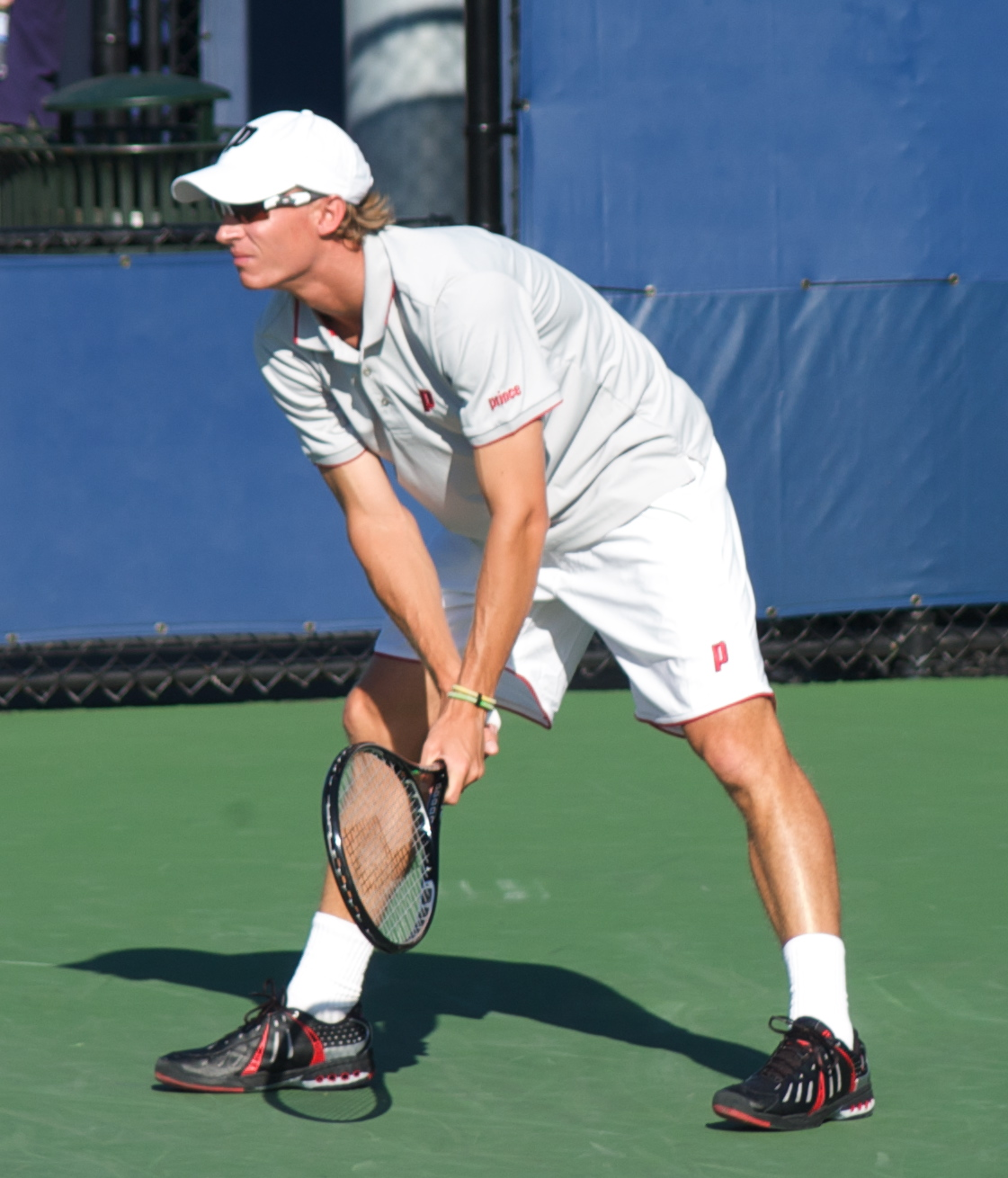
South African Rik de Voest partnered Łukasz Kubot to victory in the 2008 doubles event.

The UniCredit Czech Open is a professional tennis tournament played on outdoor red clay courts. It is currently part of the ATP Challenger Tour. It is held annually at TK Agrofert Prostějov in Prostějov, Czech Republic, since 1994.

Jan Hájek, Radek Štěpánek, Jiří Veselý are the singles record holders with three titles won. Jaroslav Levinský, winning three times the doubles titles, is the record holder for that event.

== Past finals ==
=== Singles ===
Year	Champion	Runner-up	Score
2026	(Argentina) Sebastián Báez	(Slovakia) Alex Molčan	6–4, 6–2
2025	(Bolivia) Hugo Dellien	(Chinese Taipei) Tseng Chun-hsin	6–3, 6–4
2024	(Switzerland) Jérôme Kym	(Chinese Taipei) Tseng Chun-hsin	6–2, 3–6, 6–2
2023	(Czech Republic) Dalibor Svrčina	(Czech Republic) Tomáš Macháč	6–4, 6–2
2022	(Czech Republic) Vít Kopřiva	(Czech Republic) Dalibor Svrčina	6–2, 6–2
2021	(Argentina) Federico Coria	(Slovakia) Alex Molčan	7–6^{(7–1)}, 6–3
2020	(Poland) Kamil Majchrzak	(Spain) Pablo Andújar	6–2, 7–6^{(7–5)}
2019	(Spain) Pablo Andújar	(Hungary) Attila Balázs	6–2, 7–5
2018	(Spain) Jaume Munar	(Serbia) Laslo Djere	6–1, 6–3
2017	(Czech Republic) Jiří Veselý (3)	(Argentina) Federico Delbonis	5–7, 6–1, 7–5
2016	(Kazakhstan) Mikhail Kukushkin	(Hungary) Márton Fucsovics	6–1, 6–2
2015	(Czech Republic) Jiří Veselý (2)	(Serbia) Laslo Djere	6–4, 6–2
2014	(Czech Republic) Jiří Veselý (1)	(Slovakia) Norbert Gombos	6–2, 6–2
2013	(Czech Republic) Radek Štěpánek (3)	(Czech Republic) Jiří Veselý	6–4, 6–2
2012	(Germany) Florian Mayer	(Czech Republic) Jan Hájek	7–6^{(7–1)}, 3–6, 7–6^{(7–3)}
2011	(Kazakhstan) Yuri Schukin	(Italy) Flavio Cipolla	6–4, 4–6, 6–0
2010	(Czech Republic) Jan Hájek (3)	(Czech Republic) Radek Štěpánek	6–0, ret.
2009	(Czech Republic) Jan Hájek (2)	(Belgium) Steve Darcis	6–2, 1–6, 6–4
2008	(Argentina) Agustín Calleri	(Argentina) Martín Vassallo Argüello	6–0, 6–3
2007	(Argentina) Sergio Roitman	(Germany) Florian Mayer	7–6(1), 6–4
2006	(Czech Republic) Jan Hájek (1)	(Slovakia) Dominik Hrbatý	6–3, 5–7, 6–2
2005	(Finland) Jarkko Nieminen	(Czech Republic) Ivo Minář	6–1, 6–3
2004	(Czech Republic) Radek Štěpánek (2)	(Czech Republic) Michal Tabara	7–6(5), 7–5
2003	(Czech Republic) Radek Štěpánek (1)	(Argentina) Mariano Puerta	7–5, 6–3
2002	(Argentina) Guillermo Coria	(Czech Republic) Jiří Novák	6–3, 6–3
2001	(Czech Republic) Bohdan Ulihrach (2)	(Czech Republic) Jiří Novák	6–4, 6–7(5), 6–3
2000	(Sweden) Andreas Vinciguerra	(France) Jérôme Golmard	walkover
1999	(Australia) Richard Fromberg (2)	(Spain) Juan Carlos Ferrero	7–6, 5–7, 6–4
1998	(Australia) Richard Fromberg (1)	(Australia) Andrew Ilie	6–2, 6–2
1997	(Czech Republic) Bohdan Ulihrach (1)	(Brazil) Fernando Meligeni	6–2, 4–6, 6–1
1996	(Russia) Andrei Chesnokov	(Spain) Francisco Clavet	6–3, 6–0
1995	(Italy) Andrea Gaudenzi	(Czech Republic) Jiří Novák	6–4, 6–3
1994	(Slovakia) Karol Kučera	(Czech Republic) Tomáš Anzari	6–0, 6–4

=== Doubles ===
Year	Champions	Runners-up	Score
2026	(Slovakia) Miloš Karol (Czech Republic) Andrew Paulson	Ivan Liutarevich (Poland) Filip Pieczonka	6–3, 6–3
2025	(Czech Republic) Petr Nouza (Czech Republic) Patrik Rikl	(Slovakia) Lukáš Pokorný (Czech Republic) Dalibor Svrčina	4–6, 6–3, [10–4]
2024	Ivan Liutarevich (Spain) Sergio Martos Gornés	(Netherlands) Matwé Middelkoop (Austria) Philipp Oswald	6–1, 6–4
2023	(Uruguay) Ariel Behar (Czech Republic) Adam Pavlásek	(Italy) Marco Bortolotti (Spain) Sergio Martos Gornés	7–5, 6–4
2022	(India) Yuki Bhambri (India) Saketh Myneni	(Czech Republic) Roman Jebavý (Slovakia) Andrej Martin	6–3, 7–5
2021	(Kazakhstan) Aleksandr Nedovyesov (Portugal) Gonçalo Oliveira	(Czech Republic) Roman Jebavý (Czech Republic) Zdeněk Kolář	1–6, 7–6^{(7–5)}, [10–6]
2020	(Czech Republic) Zdeněk Kolář (Czech Republic) Lukáš Rosol (2)	(India) Sriram Balaji (India) Divij Sharan	6–2, 2–6, [10–6]
2019	(Austria) Philipp Oswald (2) (Slovakia) Filip Polášek	(Czech Republic) Jiří Lehečka (Czech Republic) Jiří Veselý	6–4, 7–6^{(7–4)}
2018	(Ukraine) Denys Molchanov (Slovakia) Igor Zelenay (2)	(Uruguay) Martín Cuevas (Uruguay) Pablo Cuevas	4–6, 6–3, [10–7]
2017	(Argentina) Guillermo Durán (Argentina) Andrés Molteni	(Czech Republic) Roman Jebavý (Chile) Hans Podlipnik Castillo	7–6^{(7–5)}, 6–7^{(5–7)}, [10–6]
2016	(Belarus) Aliaksandr Bury (Slovakia) Igor Zelenay (1)	(Chile) Julio Peralta (Chile) Hans Podlipnik Castillo	6–4, 6–4
2015	(Austria) Julian Knowle (Austria) Philipp Oswald (1)	(Poland) Mateusz Kowalczyk (Slovakia) Igor Zelenay	4-6, 6–3, 11–9
2014	(Germany) Andre Begemann (Czech Republic) Lukáš Rosol (1)	(Canada) Peter Polansky (Canada) Adil Shamasdin	6–1, 6–2
2013	(United States) Nicholas Monroe (Germany) Simon Stadler	(Poland) Mateusz Kowalczyk (Czech Republic) Lukáš Rosol	6–4, 6–4
2012	(Chinese Taipei) Hsieh Cheng-peng (Chinese Taipei) Lee Hsin-han	(Australia) Colin Ebelthite (Australia) John Peers	7–5, 7–5
2011	(Ukraine) Sergei Bubka (Spain) Adrián Menéndez	(Spain) David Marrero (Spain) Rubén Ramírez Hidalgo	7–5, 6–2
2010	(Spain) Marcel Granollers (Spain) David Marrero	(Sweden) Johan Brunström (Netherlands Antilles) Jean-Julien Rojer	3–6, 6–4, [10–6]
2009	(Sweden) Johan Brunström (Netherlands Antilles) Jean-Julien Rojer	(Uruguay) Pablo Cuevas (Slovakia) Dominik Hrbatý	6–2, 6–3
2008	(South Africa) Rik de Voest (Poland) Łukasz Kubot	(South Africa) Chris Haggard (France) Nicolas Tourte	6–2, 6–2
2007	(Paraguay) Ramón Delgado (Argentina) Juan Pablo Guzmán	(Czech Republic) Tomáš Cibulec (Czech Republic) Leoš Friedl	7–6(8), 6–1
2006	(Czech Republic) František Čermák (2) (Czech Republic) Jaroslav Levinský (3)	(Czech Republic) Jan Mašík (Czech Republic) Michal Tabara	6–3, 6–2
2005	(Czech Republic) Lukáš Dlouhý (Czech Republic) David Škoch (2)	(Czech Republic) Jan Hájek (Czech Republic) Jan Mašík	5–7, 6–3, 7–6(5)
2004	(Slovakia) Dominik Hrbatý (Czech Republic) Jaroslav Levinský (2)	(United States) Travis Parrott (United States) Tripp Phillips	6–4, 6–4
2003	(Czech Republic) Jaroslav Levinský (1) (Czech Republic) David Škoch (1)	(Spain) Rubén Ramírez Hidalgo (Argentina) Sergio Roitman	6–2, 6–2
2002	(Czech Republic) František Čermák (1) (Czech Republic) Ota Fukárek	(Argentina) Mariano Hood (Argentina) Sebastián Prieto	6–3, 7–6(5)
2001	(Italy) Andrea Gaudenzi (Netherlands) Sander Groen	(United States) Devin Bowen (Argentina) Mariano Hood	7–6(6), 6–4
2000	(Spain) Alberto Martín (Israel) Eyal Ran	(Czech Republic) Petr Luxa (Italy) Vincenzo Santopadre	6–2, 6–2
1999	(Romania) Dinu Pescariu (United States) Eric Taino	(United States) Devin Bowen (Israel) Eyal Ran	6–3, 6–3
1998	(Netherlands) Edwin Kempes (Netherlands) Peter Wessels	(Czech Republic) Tomáš Cibulec (Czech Republic) Tomáš Krupa	6–4, 7–5
1997	(Czech Republic) Jiří Novák (2) (Czech Republic) David Rikl	(United States) Scott Melville (Italy) Diego Nargiso	6–4, 6–2
1996	(Germany) Mathias Huning (United States) Jack Waite	(Sweden) Fredrik Bergh (Sweden) Patrik Fredriksson	6–3, 7–6
1995	(Romania) Andrei Pavel (New Zealand) Glenn Wilson	(United States) Jeff Belloli (United States) Jack Waite	7–5, 6–3
1994	(Czech Republic) Jiří Novák (1) (Czech Republic) Radomír Vašek	(Netherlands) Sjeng Schalken (Netherlands) Joost Winnink	6–7, 6–3, 6–4
