= 2014 Mersin Cup – Singles =

Singles
- 2014 Mersin Cup

Final
- Champion: (Bosnia and Herzegovina) Damir Džumhur
- Runner-up: (Spain) Pere Riba
- Score: 7–6^{(7–4)}, 6–3

Events
Singles	Doubles
← 2013 ·	Mersin Cup	· 2015 →

Jiří Veselý was the defending champion, but decided not to participate.

Damir Džumhur won the title, defeating Pere Riba in the final, 7–6^{(7–4)}, 6–3. It was his first Challenger title in his career.

== Seeds ==
1. (Spain) Pere Riba (final)
2. (Austria) Andreas Haider-Maurer (first round)
3. (Slovenia) Aljaž Bedene (semifinals)
4. (Germany) Julian Reister (quarterfinals)
5. (Romania) Adrian Ungur (second round)
6. (Germany) Michael Berrer (second round)
7. (Turkey) Marsel İlhan (first round)
8. (Bosnia and Herzegovina) Damir Džumhur (champion)

== Draw ==
=== Key ===
- Q = Qualifier
- WC = Wild card
- LL = Lucky loser
- Alt = Alternate
- SE = Special exempt
- PR = Protected ranking
- ITF = ITF entry
- JE = Junior exempt
- w/o = Walkover
- r = Retired
- d = Defaulted
- SR = Special ranking

=== Finals ===
Semifinals
1	(Spain) Pere Riba	7^{9}	6
3	(Slovenia) Aljaž Bedene	6^{7}	2
(Italy) Matteo Viola	1	2
8	(Bosnia and Herzegovina) Damir Džumhur	6	6

Final
1	(Spain) Pere Riba	6^{4}	3
8	(Bosnia and Herzegovina) Damir Džumhur	7^{7}	6

=== Top half ===
First round
1	(Spain) P Riba	6	6
WC	(Turkey) A Yüksel	4	0
WC	(Turkey) B Ergüden	2	0^{r}
WC	(Turkey) C İlkel	6	1
(Belgium) N Desein	5	6	5
(Slovakia) N Gomboš	7	4	7
Alt	(United Kingdom) K Edmund	6	3	4
6	(Germany) M Berrer	3	6	6
3	(Slovenia) A Bedene	7^{7}	6
Q	(Austria) N Reissig	6^{0}	4
(Lithuania) L Grigelis	3	7^{7}	3
(France) J Eysseric	6	6^{4}	6
(Czech Republic) J Pospíšil	5	6^{1}
PR	(Italy) S Bolelli	7	7^{7}
WC	(Turkey) T Altuna	2	0
5	(Romania) A Ungur	6	6

Second round
1	(Spain) P Riba	6	6
WC	(Turkey) C İlkel	0	3
(Slovakia) N Gomboš	3	6	6
6	(Germany) M Berrer	6	3	0
3	(Slovenia) A Bedene	7^{7}	6
(France) J Eysseric	6^{5}	3
PR	(Italy) S Bolelli	1	6	6
5	(Romania) A Ungur	6	3	4

Quarterfinals
1	(Spain) P Riba	1	6	6
(Slovakia) N Gomboš	6	3	1
3	(Slovenia) A Bedene	7^{7}	6
PR	(Italy) S Bolelli	6^{3}	2

Semifinals
1	(Spain) P Riba	7^{9}	6
3	(Slovenia) A Bedene	6^{7}	2

=== Bottom half ===
First round
7	(Turkey) M İlhan	6	6^{1}	5
(Moldova) R Albot	3	7^{7}	7
(Italy) M Viola	7^{7}	6^{0}	6
Q	(Russia) P Davydenko	6^{0}	7^{7}	3
Q	(Austria) M Linzer	1	6	6
(Spain) G Granollers	6	3	2
(Canada) S Diez	6	4	2
4	(Germany) J Reister	2	6	6
8	(Bosnia and Herzegovina) D Džumhur	6	6
(France) G Rufin	4	1
(Belarus) E Gerasimov	7	6
(Italy) S Vagnozzi	5	2
(Croatia) K Mesaroš	4	6	6
Q	(Italy) Claudio Fortuna	6	4	3
(Italy) T Fabbiano	6	7^{7}
2	(Austria) A Haider-Maurer	3	6^{4}

Second round
(Moldova) R Albot	2	6	4
(Italy) M Viola	6	4	6
Q	(Austria) M Linzer	4	3
4	(Germany) J Reister	6	6
8	(Bosnia and Herzegovina) D Džumhur	6	7^{7}
(Belarus) E Gerasimov	3	6^{1}
(Croatia) K Mesaroš	3	1
(Italy) T Fabbiano	6	6

Quarterfinals
(Italy) M Viola	w/o
4	(Germany) J Reister
8	(Bosnia and Herzegovina) D Džumhur	6	6
(Italy) T Fabbiano	2	4

Semifinals
(Italy) M Viola	1	2
8	(Bosnia and Herzegovina) D Džumhur	6	6
