= 2013 Mersin Cup =

- Date: 8 – 14 April
- Edition: 2nd
- Draw: 32S / 16D
- Prize money: €42,500
- Surface: Clay
- Location: Mersin, Turkey

Champions

Singles
- (Czech Republic) Jiří Veselý

Doubles
- (Germany) Andreas Beck / (Germany) Dominik Meffert
← 2012 ·	Mersin Cup	· 2014 →

The 2013 Mersin Cup was a professional tennis tournament played on clay courts. It was the second edition of the tournament which was part of the 2013 ATP Challenger Tour. It took place in Mersin, Turkey between 8 and 14 April 2013.

== Singles main draw entrants ==
=== Seeds ===
Country	Player	Rank^{1}	Seed
AUT	Andreas Haider-Maurer	116	1
GER	Jan-Lennard Struff	117	2
BLR	Uladzimir Ignatik	148	3
SRB	Dušan Lajović	153	4
KAZ	Mikhail Kukushkin	156	5
GER	Simon Greul	157	6
FRA	Stéphane Robert	181	7
GER	Dominik Meffert	186	8

- ^{1} Rankings are as of April 1, 2013.

=== Other entrants ===
The following players received wildcards into the singles main draw:

- (Turkey) Tuna Altuna
- (Turkey) Cem İlkel
- (Turkey) Barkın Yalçınkale
- (Turkey) Anıl Yüksel

The following players received entry from the qualifying draw:

- (Poland) Marcin Gawron
- (Austria) Michael Linzer
- (Czech Republic) Jaroslav Pospíšil
- (Germany) Marc Sieber

== Doubles main draw entrants ==
=== Seeds ===
Country	Player	Country	Player	Rank^{1}	Seed
IRL	James Cluskey	BLR	Uladzimir Ignatik	359	1
MDA	Radu Albot	UKR	Oleksandr Nedovyesov	428	2
ITA	Alessandro Motti	ITA	Simone Vagnozzi	488	3
CZE	Jan Mertl	CZE	Jaroslav Pospíšil	544	4

- ^{1} Rankings as of April 1, 2013.

=== Other entrants ===
The following pairs received wildcards into the doubles main draw:

- (Turkey) Haluk Akkoyun / (Turkey) Marsel İlhan
- (Turkey) Durukan Durmuş / (Turkey) Anıl Yüksel
- (Turkey) Cem İlkel / (Turkey) Efe Yurtaçan

The following pair received entry using a protected ranking:

- (Germany) Andreas Beck / (Germany) Dominik Meffert

The following pair received entry as an alternate:

- (Turkey) Tuna Altuna / (Austria) Michael Linzer

== Champions ==
=== Singles ===
- (Czech Republic) Jiří Veselý def. (Germany) Simon Greul, 6–1, 6–1

=== Doubles ===
- (Germany) Andreas Beck / (Germany) Dominik Meffert def. (Moldova) Radu Albot / (Ukraine) Oleksandr Nedovyesov, 5–7, 6–3, [10–8]
