= 2015 Mersin Cup – Doubles =

Doubles
- 2015 Mersin Cup

Final
- Champions: (Croatia) Mate Pavić (New Zealand) Michael Venus
- Runners-up: (Italy) Riccardo Ghedin (India) Ramkumar Ramanathan
- Score: 5–7, 6–3, [10–4]

Events
Singles	Doubles
← 2014 ·	Mersin Cup

Radu Albot and Jaroslav Pospíšil were the defending champions, but Pospíšil did not play. Albot partnered with Matteo Viola, but they lost to Riccardo Ghedin and Ramkumar Ramanathan in the first round.

Mate Pavić and Michael Venus won the title, defeating Ghedin and Ramanathan in the final, 5–7, 6–3, [10–4].

== Seeds ==
1. (United States) Nicholas Monroe / (New Zealand) Artem Sitak (semifinals)
2. (Croatia) Mate Pavić / (New Zealand) Michael Venus (champions)
3. (Germany) Martin Emmrich / (Sweden) Andreas Siljeström (quarterfinals)
4. (China) Gong Maoxin / (Chinese Taipei) Peng Hsien-yin (semifinals)

== Draw ==
=== Key ===
- Q = Qualifier
- WC = Wild card
- LL = Lucky loser
- Alt = Alternate
- SE = Special exempt
- PR = Protected ranking
- ITF = ITF entry
- JE = Junior exempt
- w/o = Walkover
- r = Retired
- d = Defaulted
- SR = Special ranking

First round
1	(United States) N Monroe (New Zealand) A Sitak	6	6
(Russia) E Donskoy (Russia) A Kudryavtsev	3	3
(Czech Republic) R Jebavý (Slovakia) A Martin	4	6	[7]
(Chinese Taipei) H-h Lee (United Kingdom) S Thornley	6	2	[10]
3	(Germany) M Emmrich (Sweden) A Siljeström	6	6
(Bosnia and Herzegovina) D Džumhur (Bosnia and Herzegovina) A Šetkić	4	0
(Italy) R Ghedin (India) R Ramanathan	2	7	[10]
(Moldova) R Albot (Italy) M Viola	6	5	[6]
(Belgium) K Coppejans (France) T Lamasine	6	6
WC	(Turkey) Mert Adanali (Turkey) T Altuna	2	1
(Russia) A Karatsev (Slovakia) J Kovalík	5	1
4	(China) M Gong (Chinese Taipei) H-y Peng	7	6
WC	(Turkey) A Yüksel (Turkey) Efe Yurtacan	3	5
(Belarus) A Bury (Belarus) A Vasilevski	6	7
WC	(Turkey) B Ergüden (Turkey) C İlkel	3	5
2	(Croatia) M Pavić (New Zealand) M Venus	6	7

Quarterfinals
1	(United States) N Monroe (New Zealand) A Sitak	6	6
(Chinese Taipei) H-h Lee (United Kingdom) S Thornley	2	3
3	(Germany) M Emmrich (Sweden) A Siljeström	6	6^{2}	[7]
(Italy) R Ghedin (India) R Ramanathan	3	7^{7}	[10]
(Belgium) K Coppejans (France) T Lamasine	4	5
4	(China) M Gong (Chinese Taipei) H-y Peng	6	7
(Belarus) A Bury (Belarus) A Vasilevski	3	6	[8]
2	(Croatia) M Pavić (New Zealand) M Venus	6	4	[10]

Semifinals
1	(United States) N Monroe (New Zealand) A Sitak	4	4
(Italy) R Ghedin (India) R Ramanathan	6	6
4	(China) M Gong (Chinese Taipei) H-y Peng	2	4
2	(Croatia) M Pavić (New Zealand) M Venus	6	6

Final
(Italy) R Ghedin (India) R Ramanathan	7	3	[4]
2	(Croatia) M Pavić (New Zealand) M Venus	5	6	[10]
