= 2013 Mersin Cup – Doubles =

Doubles
- 2013 Mersin Cup

Final
- Champions: (Germany) Andreas Beck (Germany) Dominik Meffert
- Runners-up: (Moldova) Radu Albot (Ukraine) Oleksandr Nedovyesov
- Score: 5–7, 6–3, [10–8]

Events
Singles	Doubles
← 2012 ·	Mersin Cup	· 2014 →

Radu Albot and Denys Molchanov were the defending champions; however, Molchanov chose not to compete.
Albot teamed up with Oleksandr Nedovyesov but lost in the final to Andreas Beck and Dominik Meffert 7–5, 3–6, [8–10].

== Seeds ==
1. (Republic of Ireland) James Cluskey / (Belarus) Uladzimir Ignatik (first round)
2. (Moldova) Radu Albot / (Ukraine) Oleksandr Nedovyesov (final)
3. (Italy) Alessandro Motti / (Italy) Simone Vagnozzi (semifinals)
4. (Czech Republic) Jan Mertl / (Czech Republic) Jaroslav Pospíšil (quarterfinals)

== Draw ==
=== Key ===
- Q = Qualifier
- WC = Wild card
- LL = Lucky loser
- Alt = Alternate
- SE = Special exempt
- PR = Protected ranking
- ITF = ITF entry
- JE = Junior exempt
- w/o = Walkover
- r = Retired
- d = Defaulted
- SR = Special ranking

=== Draw ===
First round
1	(Republic of Ireland) J Cluskey (Belarus) U Ignatik	6^{4}	2
(Austria) Lukas Jastraunig (Czech Republic) Michal Konečný	7^{7}	6
(Netherlands) J Huta Galung (Germany) J-L Struff	5	6	[10]
(United States) Adham El-Effendi (United Kingdom) D Walsh	7	3	[6]
4	(Czech Republic) J Mertl (Czech Republic) J Pospíšil	7	6
WC	(Turkey) Haluk Akkoyun (Turkey) M İlhan	5	3
PR	(Germany) A Beck (Germany) D Meffert	6	3	[10]
(Romania) V Crivoi (France) S Robert	2	6	[7]
(Serbia) N Čačić (Serbia) D Lajović	4	7^{8}	[7]
(Germany) S Greul (Germany) B Knittel	6	6^{6}	[10]
WC	(Turkey) Durukan Durmuş (Turkey) A Yüksel	1	2
3	(Italy) A Motti (Italy) S Vagnozzi	6	6
Alt	(Turkey) T Altuna (Austria) M Linzer	7^{7}	6
WC	(Turkey) C İlkel (Turkey) Efe Yurtaçan	6^{3}	3
(Poland) M Gawron (Ukraine) A Smirnov	6	4	[6]
2	(Moldova) R Albot (Ukraine) O Nedovyesov	4	6	[10]

Quarterfinals
(Austria) L Jastraunig (Czech Republic) M Konečný	4	4
(Netherlands) J Huta Galung (Germany) J-L Struff	6	6
4	(Czech Republic) J Mertl (Czech Republic) J Pospíšil	6^{3}	3
PR	(Germany) A Beck (Germany) D Meffert	7^{7}	6
(Germany) S Greul (Germany) B Knittel	4	6	[9]
3	(Italy) A Motti (Italy) S Vagnozzi	6	3	[11]
Alt	(Turkey) T Altuna (Austria) M Linzer	1	2
2	(Moldova) R Albot (Ukraine) O Nedovyesov	6	6

Semifinals
(Netherlands) J Huta Galung (Germany) J-L Struff	6^{5}	1
PR	(Germany) A Beck (Germany) D Meffert	7^{7}	6
3	(Italy) A Motti (Italy) S Vagnozzi	1	7^{14}	[10]
2	(Moldova) R Albot (Ukraine) O Nedovyesov	6	6^{12}	[12]

Final
PR	(Germany) A Beck (Germany) D Meffert	5	6	[10]
2	(Moldova) R Albot (Ukraine) O Nedovyesov	7	3	[8]
