= 2014 Mersin Cup – Doubles =

Doubles
- 2014 Mersin Cup

Final
- Champions: (Moldova) Radu Albot (Czech Republic) Jaroslav Pospíšil
- Runners-up: (Italy) Thomas Fabbiano (Italy) Matteo Viola
- Score: 7–6^{(9–7)}, 6–1

Events
Singles	Doubles
← 2013 ·	Mersin Cup	· 2015 →

Andreas Beck and Dominik Meffert were the defending champions. but decided not to participate.

Radu Albot and Jaroslav Pospíšil won the title, defeating Thomas Fabbiano and Matteo Viola in the final, 7–6^{(9–7)}, 6–1.

== Seeds ==
1. (Italy) Riccardo Ghedin / (Italy) Claudio Grassi (first round)
2. (Chinese Taipei) Lee Hsin-han / (New Zealand) Artem Sitak (quarterfinals)
3. (Netherlands) Stephan Fransen / (Netherlands) Wesley Koolhof (semifinals)
4. (Belarus) Sergey Betov / (Belarus) Alexander Bury (semifinals)

== Draw ==
=== Key ===
- Q = Qualifier
- WC = Wild card
- LL = Lucky loser
- Alt = Alternate
- SE = Special exempt
- PR = Protected ranking
- ITF = ITF entry
- JE = Junior exempt
- w/o = Walkover
- r = Retired
- d = Defaulted
- SR = Special ranking

=== Draw ===
First round
1	(Italy) R Ghedin (Italy) C Grassi	6^{2}	5
(Italy) Claudio Fortuna (Lithuania) L Grigelis	7^{7}	7
(Belarus) E Gerasimov (Croatia) K Mesaroš	5	5
(Italy) T Fabbiano (Italy) M Viola	7	7
3	(Netherlands) S Fransen (Netherlands) W Koolhof	7^{7}	6
(Belgium) N Desein (Poland) G Panfil	6^{4}	4
WC	(Turkey) M İlhan (Turkey) C İlkel	6	7^{7}
(Spain) G Granollers (Spain) P Riba	4	6^{5}
WC	(Turkey) A Yüksel (Turkey) E Yurtaçan	6	7^{7}
(Canada) S Diez (Bosnia and Herzegovina) D Džumhur	1	6^{5}
WC	(Turkey) T Altuna (Turkey) B Ergüden	3	1
4	(Belarus) S Betov (Belarus) A Bury	6	6
(Moldova) R Albot (Czech Republic) J Pospíšil	6	7^{7}
(Italy) A Motti (Italy) S Vagnozzi	2	6^{3}
PR	(Republic of Ireland) J Cluskey (United States) Adham El-Effendi	4	3
2	(Chinese Taipei) H-h Lee (New Zealand) A Sitak	6	6

Quarterfinals
(Italy) C Fortuna (Lithuania) L Grigelis	6	4	[3]
(Italy) T Fabbiano (Italy) M Viola	3	6	[10]
3	(Netherlands) S Fransen (Netherlands) W Koolhof	6^{3}	6	[10]
WC	(Turkey) M İlhan (Turkey) C İlkel	7^{7}	3	[6]
WC	(Turkey) A Yüksel (Turkey) E Yurtaçan	0	2
4	(Belarus) S Betov (Belarus) A Bury	6	6
(Moldova) R Albot (Czech Republic) J Pospíšil	5	6	[10]
2	(Chinese Taipei) H-h Lee (New Zealand) A Sitak	7	4	[3]

Semifinals
(Italy) T Fabbiano (Italy) M Viola	7	6
3	(Netherlands) S Fransen (Netherlands) W Koolhof	5	4
4	(Belarus) S Betov (Belarus) A Bury	5	2
(Moldova) R Albot (Czech Republic) J Pospíšil	7	6

Final
(Italy) T Fabbiano (Italy) M Viola	6^{7}	1
(Moldova) R Albot (Czech Republic) J Pospíšil	7^{9}	6
