= 2013 Mersin Cup – Singles =

Singles
- 2013 Mersin Cup

Final
- Champion: (Czech Republic) Jiří Veselý
- Runner-up: (Germany) Simon Greul
- Score: 6–1, 6–1

Events
Singles	Doubles
← 2012 ·	Mersin Cup	· 2014 →

João Sousa was the defending champion but chose not to compete.
Jiří Veselý defeated Simon Greul 6–1, 6–1 in the final to win the title.

== Seeds ==
1. (Austria) Andreas Haider-Maurer (second round)
2. (Germany) Jan-Lennard Struff (first round)
3. (Belarus) Uladzimir Ignatik (second round)
4. (Serbia) Dušan Lajović (second round)
5. (Kazakhstan) Mikhail Kukushkin (second round)
6. (Germany) Simon Greul (final)
7. (France) Stéphane Robert (semifinals)
8. (Germany) Dominik Meffert (second round)

== Draw ==
=== Key ===
- Q = Qualifier
- WC = Wild card
- LL = Lucky loser
- Alt = Alternate
- SE = Special exempt
- PR = Protected ranking
- ITF = ITF entry
- JE = Junior exempt
- w/o = Walkover
- r = Retired
- d = Defaulted
- SR = Special ranking

=== Finals ===
Semifinals
(Germany) Bastian Knittel	6	2	1
(Czech Republic) Jiří Veselý	3	6	6
7	(France) Stéphane Robert	6^{2}	6	2
6	(Germany) Simon Greul	7^{7}	2	6

Final
(Czech Republic) Jiří Veselý	6	6
6	(Germany) Simon Greul	1	1

=== Top half ===
First round
1	(Austria) A Haider-Maurer	6	6
(Moldova) R Albot	1	2
(Germany) B Knittel	6	7^{7}
(Italy) S Vagnozzi	4	6^{4}
(Kazakhstan) E Korolev	2^{r}
Q	(Austria) M Linzer	5
WC	(Turkey) T Altuna	1	1
5	(Kazakhstan) M Kukushkin	6	6
4	(Serbia) D Lajović	6	6
WC	(Turkey) A Yüksel	3	1
(Czech Republic) J Veselý	6	6
(Uzbekistan) F Dustov	2	1
(Spain) J Martí	1	1
(Germany) J Reister	6	6
WC	(Turkey) Barkın Yalçınkale	0	0
8	(Germany) D Meffert	6	6

Second round
1	(Austria) A Haider-Maurer	2	4
(Germany) B Knittel	6	6
Q	(Austria) M Linzer	7^{7}	6
5	(Kazakhstan) M Kukushkin	6^{5}	4
4	(Serbia) D Lajović	2	6	4
(Czech Republic) J Veselý	6	3	6
(Germany) J Reister	6	6
8	(Germany) D Meffert	4	3

Quarterfinals
(Germany) B Knittel	5
Q	(Austria) M Linzer	0^{r}
(Czech Republic) J Veselý	6	7^{7}
(Germany) J Reister	2	6^{1}

Semifinals
(Germany) B Knittel	6	2	1
(Czech Republic) J Veselý	3	6	6

=== Bottom half ===
First round
7	(France) S Robert	5	6	6
Q	(Poland) M Gawron	7	3	3
LL	(Ukraine) A Smirnov	4	4
(Czech Republic) J Mertl	6	6
Q	(Czech Republic) J Pospíšil	5	3
(Romania) V Crivoi	7	6
PR	(Germany) A Beck	4	4
3	(Belarus) U Ignatik	6	6
6	(Germany) S Greul	6	7^{8}
(Netherlands) J Huta Galung	1	6^{6}
WC	(Turkey) C İlkel	2	4
(Ukraine) O Nedovyesov	6	6
(Kazakhstan) A Golubev	6	6
Q	(Germany) Marc Sieber	3	3
(Turkey) M İlhan	6^{6}	6	6
2	(Germany) J-L Struff	7^{8}	3	4

Second round
7	(France) S Robert	6	6
(Czech Republic) J Mertl	3	4
(Romania) V Crivoi	3	6	6
3	(Belarus) U Ignatik	6	3	3
6	(Germany) S Greul	6	6
(Ukraine) O Nedovyesov	2	3
(Kazakhstan) A Golubev	6	7^{9}
(Turkey) M İlhan	4	6^{7}

Quarterfinals
7	(France) S Robert	6	6
(Romania) V Crivoi	2	3
6	(Germany) S Greul	6	6
(Kazakhstan) A Golubev	4	4

Semifinals
7	(France) S Robert	6^{2}	6	2
6	(Germany) S Greul	7^{7}	2	6
