= 2015 Mersin Cup =

- Date: 13 – 19 April
- Edition: 4th
- Draw: 32S / 16D
- Prize money: €42,500
- Surface: Red clay
- Location: Mersin, Turkey

Champions

Singles
- (Belgium) Kimmer Coppejans

Doubles
- (Croatia) Mate Pavić / (New Zealand) Michael Venus
← 2014 ·	Mersin Cup

The 2015 Mersin Cup was a professional tennis tournament played on clay courts. It was the 4th edition of the tournament which was part of the 2015 ATP Challenger Tour. It took place in Mersin, Turkey between April 13 and 19.

== Singles main-draw entrants ==
=== Seeds ===
Country	Player	Rank^{1}	Seed
SRB	Filip Krajinović	86	1
BIH	Damir Džumhur	87	2
TUR	Marsel İlhan	96	3
GER	Tobias Kamke	114	4
RUS	Alexander Kudryavtsev	127	5
MDA	Radu Albot	133	6
GEO	Nikoloz Basilashvili	137	7
ROU	Victor Hănescu	140	8

- ^{1} Rankings are as of April 7, 2015

=== Other entrants ===
The following players received wildcards into the singles main draw:

- (Turkey) Anıl Yüksel
- (Turkey) Barış Ergüden
- (Turkey) Efe Yurtacan
- (Turkey) Cem İlkel

The following players received entry into the singles main draw as a special exempt:

- (France) Constant Lestienne

The following players received entry from the qualifying draw:

- (Japan) Taro Daniel
- (France) Maxime Hamou
- (Spain) Iñigo Cervantes
- (Croatia) Antonio Veić

The following players received entry as a lucky loser:

- (Czech Republic) Adam Pavlásek

== Champions ==
=== Singles ===
- (Belgium) Kimmer Coppejans def. (Turkey) Marsel İlhan, 6–2, 6–2

=== Doubles ===
- (Croatia) Mate Pavić / (New Zealand) Michael Venus def. (Italy) Riccardo Ghedin / (India) Ramkumar Ramanathan, 5–7, 6–3, [10–4]
