= 2015 Mersin Cup – Singles =

Singles
- 2015 Mersin Cup

Final
- Champion: (Belgium) Kimmer Coppejans
- Runner-up: (Turkey) Marsel İlhan
- Score: 6–2, 6–2

Events
Singles	Doubles
← 2014 ·	Mersin Cup

Damir Džumhur was the defending champion but lost in the second round.

Kimmer Coppejans won the title, defeating Marsel İlhan in the final, 6–2, 6–2.

== Seeds ==
1. (Serbia) Filip Krajinović (semifinals)
2. (Bosnia and Herzegovina) Damir Džumhur (second round)
3. (Turkey) Marsel İlhan (final)
4. (Germany) Tobias Kamke (first round)
5. (Russia) Alexander Kudryavtsev (first round)
6. (Moldova) Radu Albot (first round)
7. (Georgia (country)) Nikoloz Basilashvili (first round)
8. (Romania) Victor Hănescu (quarterfinals)

== Draw ==
=== Key ===
- Q = Qualifier
- WC = Wild card
- LL = Lucky loser
- Alt = Alternate
- SE = Special exempt
- PR = Protected ranking
- ITF = ITF entry
- JE = Junior exempt
- w/o = Walkover
- r = Retired
- d = Defaulted
- SR = Special ranking

=== Finals ===
Semifinals
1	(Serbia) Filip Krajinović	6	4	4
3	(Turkey) Marsel İlhan	0	6	6
(Belgium) Kimmer Coppejans	6	6
Q	(Spain) Íñigo Cervantes	1	3

Final
3	(Turkey) Marsel İlhan	2	2
(Belgium) Kimmer Coppejans	6	6

=== Top half ===
First round
1	(Serbia) F Krajinović	6	3	6
(Spain) R Carballés Baena	4	6	3
(Bosnia and Herzegovina) M Bašić	5	7^{7}	7^{7}
LL	(Czech Republic) A Pavlásek	7	6^{3}	6^{5}
WC	(Turkey) A Yüksel	6	6
WC	(Turkey) B Ergüden	1	2
SE	(France) C Lestienne	6	6
7	(Georgia (country)) N Basilashvili	3	3
3	(Turkey) M İlhan	7^{7}	6
Q	(France) M Hamou	6^{3}	4
(Russia) A Karatsev	6	6
(Slovakia) A Martin	4	1
(Slovakia) J Kovalík	5	6	6
(France) E Couacaud	7	3	4
(Spain) R Ramírez Hidalgo	7	2	3
8	(Romania) V Hănescu	5	6	6

Second round
1	(Serbia) F Krajinović	6	6
(Bosnia and Herzegovina) M Bašić	4	1
WC	(Turkey) A Yüksel	3	0
SE	(France) C Lestienne	6	6
3	(Turkey) M İlhan	7^{7}	6^{6}	6
(Russia) A Karatsev	6^{4}	7^{8}	2
(Slovakia) J Kovalík	6	3	6^{5}
8	(Romania) V Hănescu	1	6	7^{7}

Quarterfinals
1	(Serbia) F Krajinović	6	6
SE	(France) C Lestienne	2	0
3	(Turkey) M İlhan	6	6
8	(Romania) V Hănescu	3	4

Semifinals
1	(Serbia) F Krajinović	6	4	4
3	(Turkey) M İlhan	0	6	6

=== Bottom half ===
First round
6	(Moldova) R Albot	4	2
Q	(Japan) T Daniel	6	6
WC	(Turkey) Efe Yurtacan	3	1
(France) T Lamasine	6	6
(Belgium) K Coppejans	6	6
(Italy) M Viola	4	3
(Russia) E Donskoy	7	6
4	(Germany) T Kamke	5	2
5	(Russia) A Kudryavtsev	4	6^{3}
Q	(Spain) Í Cervantes	6	7^{7}
(Bosnia and Herzegovina) A Šetkić	6^{3}	3
(Croatia) M Delić	7^{7}	6
(Slovakia) M Mečíř Jr.	6	4	2
Q	(Croatia) A Veić	1	6	6
WC	(Turkey) C İlkel	2	0
2	(Bosnia and Herzegovina) D Džumhur	6	6

Second round
Q	(Japan) T Daniel	6	6
(France) T Lamasine	3	2
(Belgium) K Coppejans	6	6
(Russia) E Donskoy	2	2
Q	(Spain) Í Cervantes	6	6
(Croatia) M Delić	3	1
Q	(Croatia) A Veić	1	6	6
2	(Bosnia and Herzegovina) D Džumhur	6	3	3

Quarterfinals
Q	(Japan) T Daniel	4	0
(Belgium) K Coppejans	6	6
Q	(Spain) Í Cervantes	6	6
Q	(Croatia) A Veić	2	4

Semifinals
(Belgium) K Coppejans	6	6
Q	(Spain) Í Cervantes	1	3
