= 2010 Prosperita Open =

- Date: April 26 – May 2, 2010
- Edition: 7th
- Location: Ostrava, Czech Republic

Champions

Singles
- (Czech Republic) Lukáš Rosol

Doubles
- (Austria) Martin Fischer / (Austria) Philipp Oswald
| ← 2009 · | Prosperita Open | · 2011 → |

The 2010 Prosperita Open was a professional tennis tournament played on red clay courts. It was part of the 2010 ATP Challenger Tour. It took place in Ostrava, Czech Republic between April 26 and May 2, 2010.

== ATP entrants ==
=== Seeds ===
| Nationality | Player | Ranking* | Seeding |
|---|---|---|---|
| SVK | Karol Beck | 83 | 1 |
| RUS | Teymuraz Gabashvili | 113 | 2 |
| CZE | Jan Hernych | 134 | 3 |
| FRA | David Guez | 138 | 4 |
| ROU | Adrian Ungur | 172 | 5 |
| ARG | Juan Pablo Brzezicki | 176 | 6 |
| BLR | Uladzimir Ignatik | 179 | 7 |
| CRO | Ivan Dodig | 185 | 8 |

- Rankings are as of April 19, 2010.

=== Other entrants ===
The following players received wildcards into the singles main draw:

- (Croatia) Mario Ančić
- (Poland) Grzegorz Panfil
- (Czech Republic) Martin Přikryl
- (Czech Republic) Jiří Veselý

The following players received entry from the qualifying draw:

- (Serbia) Filip Krajinović
- (Czech Republic) Jan Mertl
- (Poland) Dawid Olejniczak
- (Czech Republic) Pavel Šnobel

== Champions ==
=== Singles ===
(Czech Republic) Lukáš Rosol def. (Croatia) Ivan Dodig, 7–5, 4–6, 7–6(4)

=== Doubles ===
(Austria) Martin Fischer / (Austria) Philipp Oswald vs (Poland) Tomasz Bednarek / (Poland) Mateusz Kowalczyk, 2–6, 7–6(6), [10–8]
