= 2011 Prosperita Open – Doubles =

Doubles
- 2011 Prosperita Open

Final
- Champions: (France) Olivier Charroin (France) Stéphane Robert
- Runners-up: (Latvia) Andis Juška (Russia) Alexandre Kudryavtsev
- Score: 6–4, 6–3

Events
Singles	Doubles
← 2010 ·	Prosperita Open	· 2012 →

Martin Fischer and Philipp Oswald were the defending champions, but decided not to participate.
Olivier Charroin and Stéphane Robert defeated Andis Juška and Alexandre Kudryavtsev 6–4, 6–3 in the final.

== Seeds ==
1. (Czech Republic) Lukáš Dlouhý / (Czech Republic) David Škoch (quarterfinals)
2. (Poland) Tomasz Bednarek / (Poland) Mateusz Kowalczyk (quarterfinals)
3. (United States) Travis Parrott / (Sweden) Andreas Siljeström (quarterfinals)
4. (Australia) Sadik Kadir / (India) Purav Raja (first round)

== Draw ==
=== Key ===
- Q = Qualifier
- WC = Wild card
- LL = Lucky loser
- Alt = Alternate
- SE = Special exempt
- PR = Protected ranking
- ITF = ITF entry
- JE = Junior exempt
- w/o = Walkover
- r = Retired
- d = Defaulted
- SR = Special ranking

=== Draw ===
First round
1	(Czech Republic) L Dlouhý (Czech Republic) D Škoch	6	6
(Belarus) U Ignatik (Estonia) J Zopp	4	4
(France) O Charroin (France) S Robert	6	6
(Slovakia) I Klec (Slovakia) L Lacko	1	1
3	(United States) T Parrott (Sweden) A Siljeström	6	3	[11]
WC	(Czech Republic) Marian Podeprel (Czech Republic) Martin Schulhauser	4	6	[9]
(Slovakia) K Beck (Slovakia) A Martin	6	6
(Czech Republic) D Lojda (France) B Paire	2	1
WC	(Slovakia) Marko Daniš (Slovakia) D Hrbatý	7	6
(France) D Guez (France) O Patience	5	0
(Latvia) A Juška (Russia) A Kudryavtsev	6	6
4	(Australia) S Kadir (India) P Raja	4	1
(Czech Republic) L Rosol (Austria) M Slanar	6	6
WC	(Czech Republic) J Pospíšil (Czech Republic) J Veselý	4	2
(South Africa) J Coetzee (Australia) J Kerr	7	4	2
2	(Poland) T Bednarek (Poland) M Kowalczyk	6^{3}	6	[10]

Quarterfinals
1	(Czech Republic) L Dlouhý (Czech Republic) D Škoch	4	4
(France) O Charroin (France) S Robert	6	6
3	(United States) T Parrott (Sweden) A Siljeström	3	4
(Slovakia) K Beck (Slovakia) A Martin	6	6
WC	(Slovakia) Marko Daniš (Slovakia) D Hrbatý	6	2	[3]
(Latvia) A Juška (Russia) A Kudryavtsev	2	6	[10]
(Czech Republic) L Rosol (Austria) M Slanar	6	6^{6}	[12]
2	(Poland) T Bednarek (Poland) M Kowalczyk	4	7	[10]

Semifinals
(France) O Charroin (France) S Robert	3	6	[10]
(Slovakia) K Beck (Slovakia) A Martin	6	2	[8]
(Latvia) A Juška (Russia) A Kudryavtsev	7	6
(Czech Republic) L Rosol (Austria) M Slanar	6^{5}	4

Final
(France) O Charroin (France) S Robert	6	6
(Latvia) A Juška (Russia) A Kudryavtsev	4	3
