= 2012 Prosperita Open – Singles =

Singles
- 2012 Prosperita Open

Final
- Champion: (France) Jonathan Dasnières de Veigy
- Runner-up: (Czech Republic) Jan Hájek
- Score: 7–5, 6–2

Events
Singles	Doubles
← 2011 ·	Prosperita Open	· 2013 →

Stéphane Robert was the defending champion but decided not to participate.
Jonathan Dasnières de Veigy won the title by defeating Jan Hájek 7–5, 6–2 in the final.

== Seeds ==
1. (Czech Republic) Jan Hájek (final)
2. (Russia) Teymuraz Gabashvili (second round)
3. (France) Guillaume Rufin (semifinals)
4. (Czech Republic) Jan Mertl (second round)
5. (Italy) Simone Vagnozzi (semifinals)
6. (Belgium) Yannick Mertens (second round)
7. (Czech Republic) Dušan Lojda (quarterfinals)
8. (France) Mathieu Rodrigues (first round)

== Draw ==
=== Key ===
- Q = Qualifier
- WC = Wild card
- LL = Lucky loser
- Alt = Alternate
- SE = Special exempt
- PR = Protected ranking
- ITF = ITF entry
- JE = Junior exempt
- w/o = Walkover
- r = Retired
- d = Defaulted
- SR = Special ranking

=== Finals ===
Semifinals
1	(Czech Republic) Jan Hájek	6	6
3	(France) Guillaume Rufin	3	4
5	(Italy) Simone Vagnozzi	2	5
(France) Jonathan Dasnières de Veigy	6	7

Final
1	(Czech Republic) Jan Hájek	5	2
(France) Jonathan Dasnières de Veigy	7	6

=== Top half ===
First round
1	(Czech Republic) J Hájek	6	6
(Australia) B Mitchell	4	3
WC	(Czech Republic) J Veselý	3	2
(Germany) A Begemann	6	6
WC	(Czech Republic) Jakub Lustyk	3	2
(Italy) Enrico Burzi	6	6
WC	(Poland) G Panfil	5	3
6	(Belgium) Y Mertens	7	6
3	(France) G Rufin	5	7	6
LL	(Poland) M Gawron	7	5	3
(Slovakia) K Čapkovič	6	4	4
(Moldova) R Albot	4	6	6
Q	(Czech Republic) M Michalička	5	2
(Italy) T Fabbiano	7	6
(France) Julien Obry	5	0
7	(Czech Republic) D Lojda	7	6

Second round
1	(Czech Republic) J Hájek	6	7
(Germany) A Begemann	2	5
(Italy) Enrico Burzi	7	3	7
6	(Belgium) Y Mertens	5	6	5
3	(France) G Rufin	6	6
(Moldova) R Albot	4	2
(Italy) T Fabbiano	4	6^{2}
7	(Czech Republic) D Lojda	6	7^{7}

Quarterfinals
1	(Czech Republic) J Hájek	6	6
(Italy) Enrico Burzi	4	2
3	(France) G Rufin	6	7^{7}
7	(Czech Republic) D Lojda	0	6^{4}

Semifinals
1	(Czech Republic) J Hájek	6	6
3	(France) G Rufin	3	4

=== Bottom half ===
First round
5	(Italy) S Vagnozzi	6	6
(Canada) É Chvojka	3	3
WC	(Czech Republic) A Pavlásek	5	3
Q	(Slovenia) G Žemlja	7	6
(France) A Michon	0	6^{5}
(Italy) M Marrai	6	7^{7}
(Austria) P Oswald	2	5
4	(Czech Republic) J Mertl	6	7
8	(France) M Rodrigues	5	1
(France) J Dasnières de Veigy	7	6
PR	(Croatia) F Škugor	3	2
(Spain) G Granollers	6	6
Q	(Slovakia) A Martin	3	6	6
(Australia) M Reid	6	3	2
Q	(Austria) M Neuchrist	4	6^{5}
2	(Russia) T Gabashvili	6	7^{7}

Second round
5	(Italy) S Vagnozzi	6	6
Q	(Slovenia) G Žemlja	4	3
(Italy) M Marrai	7^{7}	6
4	(Czech Republic) J Mertl	6^{5}	3
(France) J Dasnières de Veigy	6	6
(Spain) G Granollers	3	1
Q	(Slovakia) A Martin	6	6
2	(Russia) T Gabashvili	4	0

Quarterfinals
5	(Italy) S Vagnozzi	7	6
(Italy) M Marrai	5	3
(France) J Dasnières de Veigy	3	6	6
Q	(Slovakia) A Martin	6	3	3

Semifinals
5	(Italy) S Vagnozzi	2	5
(France) J Dasnières de Veigy	6	7
