= 2012 Mersin Cup – Singles =

Singles
- 2012 Mersin Cup

Final
- Champion: (Portugal) João Sousa
- Runner-up: (Spain) Javier Martí
- Score: 6–4, 0–6, 6–4

Events
Singles	Doubles
← 2011 ·	Mersin Cup	· 2013 →

João Sousa won the title, defeating Javier Martí 6–4, 0–6, 6–4 in the final.

== Seeds ==
1. (Slovakia) Martin Kližan (first round)
2. (Turkey) Marsel İlhan (second round)
3. (Netherlands) Igor Sijsling (quarterfinals)
4. (Germany) Daniel Brands (quarterfinals)
5. (Netherlands) Thomas Schoorel (semifinals)
6. (Czech Republic) Jan Hájek (semifinals)
7. (Portugal) João Sousa (champion)
8. (Spain) Javier Martí (final)

== Draw ==
=== Key ===
- Q = Qualifier
- WC = Wild card
- LL = Lucky loser
- Alt = Alternate
- SE = Special exempt
- PR = Protected ranking
- ITF = ITF entry
- JE = Junior exempt
- w/o = Walkover
- r = Retired
- d = Defaulted
- SR = Special ranking

=== Finals ===
Semifinals
8	(Spain) Javier Martí	7	6
5	(Netherlands) Thomas Schoorel	5	0
7	(Portugal) João Sousa	6	7^{7}
6	(Czech Republic) Jan Hájek	4	6^{5}

Final
8	(Spain) Javier Martí	4	6	4
7	(Portugal) João Sousa	6	0	6

=== Top half ===
First round
1	(Slovakia) M Kližan	1	2
(Serbia) D Lajović	6	6
(Slovakia) P Červenák	6	6
(Ukraine) D Molchanov	3	2
(Romania) V Crivoi	6	6
LL	(Czech Republic) Ľubomír Majšajdr	0	2
(Spain) G Olaso	6	1	4
8	(Spain) J Martí	4	6	6
3	(Netherlands) I Sijsling	6	6
(Czech Republic) D Lojda	3	4
(France) M Teixeira	6	6
(Germany) JL Struff	4	4
(Romania) M Copil	3	6^{5}
(Moldova) R Albot	6	7^{7}
WC	(Turkey) Can Altiner	2	1
5	(Netherlands) T Schoorel	6	6

Second round
(Serbia) D Lajović	6	6
(Slovakia) P Červenák	0	2
(Romania) V Crivoi	6	6^{5}	6^{5}
8	(Spain) J Martí	4	7^{7}	7^{7}
3	(Netherlands) I Sijsling	6	2	6
(France) M Teixeira	2	6	4
(Moldova) R Albot	3	5
5	(Netherlands) T Schoorel	6	7

Quarterfinals
(Serbia) D Lajović	4	3
8	(Spain) J Martí	6	6
3	(Netherlands) I Sijsling	2	6^{2}
5	(Netherlands) T Schoorel	6	7^{7}

Semifinals
8	(Spain) J Martí	7	6
5	(Netherlands) T Schoorel	5	0

=== Bottom half ===
First round
7	(Portugal) J Sousa	4	6	6
Q	(Czech Republic) Michal Schmid	6	3	1
(Netherlands) J Huta Galung	6^{5}	6	6
(Italy) G Naso	7^{7}	4	0
Q	(Romania) G Moraru	2	3
(Germany) P Gojowczyk	6	6
WC	(Turkey) H Akkoyun	0	2
4	(Germany) D Brands	6	6
6	(Czech Republic) J Hájek	5	7^{7}	6
Q	(France) J Inzerillo	7	6^{0}	1
(Spain) G Granollers	6	6
WC	(Turkey) Barkin Yalcinkale	0	2
(Italy) S Vagnozzi	6	6
WC	(Turkey) E Zorlu	4	2
Q	(Russia) I Nedelko	4	6	6^{9}
2	(Turkey) M İlhan	6	4	7^{11}

Second round
7	(Portugal) J Sousa	6^{8}	6	7
(Netherlands) J Huta Galung	7^{10}	2	5
(Germany) P Gojowczyk	5	2
4	(Germany) D Brands	7	6
6	(Czech Republic) J Hájek	7^{7}	7^{7}
(Spain) G Granollers	6^{1}	6^{5}
(Italy) S Vagnozzi	6	6
2	(Turkey) M İlhan	3	3

Quarterfinals
7	(Portugal) J Sousa	6	6^{3}	6
4	(Germany) D Brands	4	7^{7}	4
6	(Czech Republic) J Hájek	6	6
(Italy) S Vagnozzi	3	4

Semifinals
7	(Portugal) J Sousa	6	7^{7}
6	(Czech Republic) J Hájek	4	6^{5}
