= 2012 Mersin Cup – Doubles =

Doubles
- 2012 Mersin Cup

Final
- Champions: (Moldova) Radu Albot (Ukraine) Denys Molchanov
- Runners-up: (Italy) Alessandro Motti (Italy) Simone Vagnozzi
- Score: 6–0, 6–2

Events
Singles	Doubles
← 2011 ·	Mersin Cup	· 2013 →

Radu Albot and Denys Molchanov won the title, defeating Alessandro Motti and Simone Vagnozzi 6–0, 6–2 in the final.

== Seeds ==
1. (Italy) Alessandro Motti / (Italy) Simone Vagnozzi (final)
2. (Moldova) Radu Albot / (Ukraine) Denys Molchanov (champions)
3. (Spain) Gerard Granollers / (Spain) Guillermo Olaso (first round)
4. (Serbia) Dušan Lajović / (Spain) Javier Martí (semifinals)

== Draw ==
=== Key ===
- Q = Qualifier
- WC = Wild card
- LL = Lucky loser
- Alt = Alternate
- SE = Special exempt
- PR = Protected ranking
- ITF = ITF entry
- JE = Junior exempt
- w/o = Walkover
- r = Retired
- d = Defaulted
- SR = Special ranking

=== Draw ===
First round
(Spain) O Burrieza-López (Spain) Carlos Gómez-Ferre	2	2
(Romania) M Copil (Romania) G Moraru	6	6
3	(Spain) G Granollers (Spain) G Olaso	1	2
(Sweden) Jesper Brunström (Sweden) Markus Eriksson	6	6
(Czech Republic) J Hájek (Czech Republic) Jan Subota	w/o
(Turkey) H Akkoyun (Turkey) E Zorlu
(Romania) V Crivoi (Czech Republic) D Lojda	2	4
(Slovakia) P Červenák (Slovakia) M Kližan	6	6
(Turkey) Can Altiner (Turkey) Barkin Yalcinkale	1	1
4	(Serbia) D Lajović (Spain) J Martí	6	6
(France) J Inzerillo (Russia) Ivan Nedelko	6	3	[10]
(Czech Republic) Ľubomír Majšajdr (Czech Republic) Michal Schmid	3	6	[6]

Quarterfinals
1	(Italy) A Motti (Italy) S Vagnozzi	6	6
(Romania) M Copil (Romania) G Moraru	4	3
(Sweden) Jesper Brunström (Sweden) Markus Eriksson	6	2	[8]
(Turkey) H Akkoyun (Turkey) E Zorlu	2	6	[10]
(Slovakia) P Červenák (Slovakia) M Kližan	w/o
4	(Serbia) D Lajović (Spain) J Martí
(France) J Inzerillo (Russia) Ivan Nedelko	2	2
2	(Moldova) R Albot (Ukraine) D Molchanov	6	6

Semifinals
1	(Italy) A Motti (Italy) S Vagnozzi	6	6
(Turkey) H Akkoyun (Turkey) E Zorlu	1	2
4	(Serbia) D Lajović (Spain) J Martí	2	4
2	(Moldova) R Albot (Ukraine) D Molchanov	6	6

Final
1	(Italy) A Motti (Italy) S Vagnozzi	0	2
2	(Moldova) R Albot (Ukraine) D Molchanov	6	6
