= 2014 UniCredit Czech Open – Doubles =

Doubles
- 2014 UniCredit Czech Open

Final
- Champions: (Germany) Andre Begemann (Czech Republic) Lukáš Rosol
- Runners-up: (Canada) Peter Polansky (Canada) Adil Shamasdin
- Score: 6–1, 6–2

Events
Singles	Doubles
- UniCredit Czech Open

Nicholas Monroe and Simon Stadler were the defending champions but decided not to participate.

Andre Begemann and Lukáš Rosol won the title, defeating Peter Polansky and Adil Shamasdin in the final, 6–1, 6–2.

== Seeds ==
1. (Poland) Tomasz Bednarek / (Czech Republic) Lukáš Dlouhý (quarterfinals)
2. (Germany) Andre Begemann / (Czech Republic) Lukáš Rosol (champions)
3. (Germany) Martin Emmrich / (Germany) Christopher Kas (first round)
4. (Czech Republic) František Čermák / (Russia) Mikhail Elgin (quarterfinals)

== Draw ==
Key

- Q = Qualifier
- WC = Wild card
- LL = Lucky loser
- Alt = Alternate
- ITF = ITF entry
- PR = Protected ranking
- SR = Special ranking
- SE = Special exempt
- JE = Junior exempt
- JR = Junior Accelerator Programme entrant
- CO = College Accelerator Programme entrant
- NG = Next Gen Accelerator Program entrant
- w/o = Walkover
- r = Retired
- d = Defaulted

=== Draw ===
First round
1	(Poland) T Bednarek (Czech Republic) L Dlouhý	6	6
(Brazil) M Demoliner (India) P Raja	4	4
(Greece) T Angelopoulos (India) S Devvarman	4	4
(United States) J Cerretani (Sweden) A Siljeström	6	6
4	(Czech Republic) F Čermák (Russia) M Elgin	6^{3}	6	[11]
(United States) B Klahn (Kazakhstan) O Nedovyesov	7^{7}	3	[9]
WC	(Czech Republic) Michal Konečný (Czech Republic) J Pospíšil	4	6^{3}
(Canada) P Polansky (Canada) A Shamasdin	6	7^{7}
(Poland) M Kowalczyk (Slovakia) I Zelenay	7^{8}	6
(France) A Michon (Brazil) J Souza	6^{6}	3
WC	(Czech Republic) A Pavlásek (Czech Republic) J Veselý	6	6^{5}	[10]
3	(Germany) M Emmrich (Germany) C Kas	3	7^{7}	[7]
WC	(Czech Republic) Z Kolář (Czech Republic) D Poljak	7^{14}	4	[10]
(Argentina) F Argüello (Argentina) A Velotti	6^{12}	6	[8]
(Australia) R Junaid (Slovakia) M Mertiňák	6	6^{5}	[10]
2	(Germany) A Begemann (Czech Republic) L Rosol	2	7^{7}	[12]

Quarterfinals
1	(Poland) T Bednarek (Czech Republic) L Dlouhý	5	6	[3]
(United States) J Cerretani (Sweden) A Siljeström	7	0	[10]
4	(Czech Republic) F Čermák (Russia) M Elgin	4	6	[10]
(Canada) P Polansky (Canada) A Shamasdin	6	1	[12]
(Poland) M Kowalczyk (Slovakia) I Zelenay	6^{4}	6^{4}
WC	(Czech Republic) A Pavlásek (Czech Republic) J Veselý	7^{7}	7^{7}
WC	(Czech Republic) Z Kolář (Czech Republic) D Poljak	2	2
2	(Germany) A Begemann (Czech Republic) L Rosol	6	6

Semifinals
(United States) J Cerretani (Sweden) A Siljeström	4	4
(Canada) P Polansky (Canada) A Shamasdin	6	6
WC	(Czech Republic) A Pavlásek (Czech Republic) J Veselý	2	4
2	(Germany) A Begemann (Czech Republic) L Rosol	6	6

Final
(Canada) P Polansky (Canada) A Shamasdin	1	2
2	(Germany) A Begemann (Czech Republic) L Rosol	6	6
