= 2011 Prosperita Open – Singles =

Singles
- 2011 Prosperita Open

Final
- Champion: (France) Stéphane Robert
- Runner-up: (Hungary) Ádám Kellner
- Score: 6–1, 6–3

Events
Singles	Doubles
← 2010 ·	Prosperita Open	· 2012 →

Lukáš Rosol was the defending champion, but was eliminated by Stéphane Robert in the second round.
Stéphane Robert won the title, defeating Ádám Kellner 6–1, 6–3 in the final.

== Seeds ==
1. (Czech Republic) Jaroslav Pospíšil (second round)
2. (Slovakia) Lukáš Lacko (first round)
3. (France) Benoît Paire (semifinals)
4. (Czech Republic) Ivo Minář (first round)
5. (Czech Republic) Lukáš Rosol (second round)
6. (Slovakia) Karol Beck (second round)
7. (Russia) Alexandre Kudryavtsev (quarterfinals)
8. (France) David Guez (semifinals)

== Draw ==
=== Key ===
- Q = Qualifier
- WC = Wild card
- LL = Lucky loser
- Alt = Alternate
- SE = Special exempt
- PR = Protected ranking
- ITF = ITF entry
- JE = Junior exempt
- w/o = Walkover
- r = Retired
- d = Defaulted
- SR = Special ranking

=== Finals ===
Semifinals
(France) Stéphane Robert	6	6^{4}	6
3	(France) Benoît Paire	4	7	1
8	(France) David Guez	2	4
Q	(Hungary) Ádám Kellner	6	6

Final
(France) Stéphane Robert	6	6
Q	(Hungary) Ádám Kellner	1	3

=== Top half ===
First round
1	(Czech Republic) J Pospíšil	6	6
Q	(Slovakia) K Čapkovič	1	0
Q	(Slovakia) P Červenák	3	6	4
(Ukraine) S Bubka	6	1	6
(France) S Robert	4	6	7
(Slovakia) M Semjan	6	0	5
(Slovakia) I Klec	6^{5}	6^{6}
5	(Czech Republic) L Rosol	7	7
3	(France) B Paire	6	6
(France) Laurent Rochette	3	2
WC	(Czech Republic) J Veselý	6	4	1
(Germany) Alexander Flock	4	6	6
(Russia) E Donskoy	2	2
(Estonia) J Zopp	6	6
(Kazakhstan) E Korolev	3	6	6^{3}
7	(Russia) A Kudryavtsev	6	3	7

Second round
1	(Czech Republic) J Pospíšil	6	4	6^{4}
(Ukraine) S Bubka	4	6	7
(France) S Robert	7	2	6
5	(Czech Republic) L Rosol	5	6	4
3	(France) B Paire	6	6
(Germany) Alexander Flock	3	1
(Estonia) J Zopp	5	6	4
7	(Russia) A Kudryavtsev	7	1	6

Quarterfinals
(Ukraine) S Bubka	6^{6}	4
(France) S Robert	7	6
3	(France) B Paire	6	6
7	(Russia) A Kudryavtsev	4	3

Semifinals
(France) S Robert	6	6^{4}	6
3	(France) B Paire	4	7	1

=== Bottom half ===
First round
8	(France) D Guez	6	6
WC	(Czech Republic) Martin Přikryl	2	3
WC	(Austria) N Reissig	7	4	6
(France) O Patience	5	6	3
(France) J Eysseric	4	7	6
(Slovakia) A Martin	6	6^{9}	3
(Spain) G Alcaide	6	6
4	(Czech Republic) I Minář	4	0
6	(Slovakia) K Beck	6	1	7
Q	(Latvia) A Juška	1	6	5
Q	(Hungary) Á Kellner	6	6
WC	(Czech Republic) L Dlouhý	4	4
(Czech Republic) D Lojda	6^{4}	6	3
(Croatia) N Mektić	7	3	6
(Belarus) U Ignatik	6	2	6
2	(Slovakia) L Lacko	4	6	3

Second round
8	(France) D Guez	6	6
WC	(Austria) N Reissig	3	4
(France) J Eysseric	7	6
(Spain) G Alcaide	6^{6}	0
6	(Slovakia) K Beck	3	1
Q	(Hungary) Á Kellner	6	6
(Croatia) N Mektić	3	4
(Belarus) U Ignatik	6	6

Quarterfinals
8	(France) D Guez	6	6
(France) J Eysseric	4	0
Q	(Hungary) Á Kellner	2	7	6
(Belarus) U Ignatik	6	6^{8}	3

Semifinals
8	(France) D Guez	2	4
Q	(Hungary) Á Kellner	6	6
