= 2010 Prosperita Open – Singles =

Singles
- 2010 Prosperita Open

Final
- Champion: (Czech Republic) Lukáš Rosol
- Runner-up: (Croatia) Ivan Dodig
- Score: 7–5, 4–6, 7–6(4)

Events
Singles	Doubles
← 2009 ·	Prosperita Open	· 2011 →

Jan Hájek was the defending champion; however, he chose to compete in Rome instead.
Lukáš Rosol won in the final 7–5, 4–6, 7–6(4) against Ivan Dodig.

== Seeds ==
1. (Slovakia) Karol Beck (first round, retired due to right knee)
2. (Russia) Teymuraz Gabashvili (first round)
3. (Czech Republic) Jan Hernych (second round)
4. (France) David Guez (first round)
5. (Romania) Adrian Ungur (first round)
6. (Argentina) Juan Pablo Brzezicki (second round)
7. (Belarus) Uladzimir Ignatik (first round)
8. (Croatia) Ivan Dodig (final)

== Draw ==
=== Key ===
- Q = Qualifier
- WC = Wild card
- LL = Lucky loser
- Alt = Alternate
- SE = Special exempt
- PR = Protected ranking
- ITF = ITF entry
- JE = Junior exempt
- w/o = Walkover
- r = Retired
- d = Defaulted
- SR = Special ranking

=== Finals ===
Semifinals
8	(Croatia) Ivan Dodig	7	6
(Croatia) Antonio Veić	5	3
Q	(Czech Republic) Pavel Šnobel	5	3
(Czech Republic) Lukáš Rosol	7	6

Final
8	(Croatia) Ivan Dodig	5	6	6^{4}
(Czech Republic) Lukáš Rosol	7	4	7

=== Top half ===
First round
1	(Slovakia) K Beck	0	r
(Slovakia) M Kližan	5
Q	(Czech Republic) J Mertl	6	1	4
(Spain) R Bautista-Agut	3	6	6
(Spain) A Menéndez-Maceiras	6	6
(Australia) J Millman	3	3
(Belgium) Y Mertens	1	2
8	(Croatia) I Dodig	6	6
4	(France) D Guez	3	3
(Austria) A Haider-Maurer	6	6
(Austria) P Oswald	4	5
(Croatia) A Veić	6	7
(Czech Republic) J Vaněk	3	7	3
(Austria) M Fischer	6	5	6
WC	(Poland) G Panfil	6	6
5	(Romania) A Ungur	1	4

Second round
(Slovakia) M Kližan	6	4	3
(Spain) R Bautista-Agut	1	6	6
(Spain) A Menéndez-Maceiras	7	2	2
8	(Croatia) I Dodig	6^{4}	6	6
(Austria) A Haider-Maurer	4	6^{7}
(Croatia) A Veić	6	7
(Austria) M Fischer	2	7	6
WC	(Poland) G Panfil	6	6^{5}	4

Quarterfinals
(Spain) R Bautista-Agut	7	3	4
8	(Croatia) I Dodig	5	6	6
(Croatia) A Veić	5	6	6
(Austria) M Fischer	7	4	0

Semifinals
8	(Croatia) I Dodig	7	6
(Croatia) A Veić	5	3

=== Bottom half ===
First round
7	(Belarus) U Ignatik	4	6	1
Q	(Czech Republic) P Šnobel	6	3	6
WC	(Czech Republic) M Přikryl	1	0
Q	(Serbia) F Krajinović	6	6
(Hungary) A Balázs	6	3	6
(Slovakia) P Červenák	3	6	2
(France) J Dasnières de Veigy	4	5
3	(Czech Republic) J Hernych	6	7
6	(Argentina) JP Brzezicki	5	6	6
WC	(Czech Republic) J Veselý	7	2	2
WC	(Croatia) M Ančić	6	4	5
(Czech Republic) I Minář	4	6	7
Q	(Poland) D Olejniczak	6	3	4
(Spain) D Marrero	3	6	6
(Czech Republic) L Rosol	4	6	6
2	(Russia) T Gabashvili	6	3	0

Second round
Q	(Czech Republic) P Šnobel	6	7
Q	(Serbia) F Krajinović	2	5
(Hungary) A Balázs	6	6
3	(Czech Republic) J Hernych	2	2
6	(Argentina) JP Brzezicki	1	1
(Czech Republic) I Minář	6	6
(Spain) D Marrero	2	3
(Czech Republic) L Rosol	6	6

Quarterfinals
Q	(Czech Republic) P Šnobel	7	6
(Hungary) A Balázs	6^{3}	3
(Czech Republic) I Minář	6^{1}	6	3
(Czech Republic) L Rosol	6	3	6

Semifinals
Q	(Czech Republic) P Šnobel	5	3
(Czech Republic) L Rosol	7	6
