= 2012 Prosperita Open =

- Date: 28 April – 6 May
- Edition: 9th
- Surface: Clay
- Location: Ostrava, Czech Republic

Champions

Singles
- (France) Jonathan Dasnières de Veigy

Doubles
- (Moldova) Radu Albot / (Russia) Teymuraz Gabashvili
← 2011 ·	Prosperita Open	· 2013 →

The 2012 Prosperita Open was a professional tennis tournament played on clay courts. It was the ninth edition of the tournament which was part of the 2012 ATP Challenger Tour. A $50,000 tournament, it took place in Ostrava, Czech Republic between 28 April and 6 May 2012.

== ATP entrants ==
=== Seeds ===
Country	Player	Rank^{1}	Seed
CZE	Jan Hájek	137	1
RUS	Teymuraz Gabashvili	153	2
FRA	Guillaume Rufin	157	3
CZE	Jan Mertl	180	4
ITA	Simone Vagnozzi	207	5
BEL	Yannick Mertens	215	6
CZE	Dušan Lojda	216	7
FRA	Mathieu Rodrigues	223	8

- ^{1} Rankings are as of 23 April 2012.

=== Other entrants ===
The following players received wildcards into the singles main draw:

- (Czech Republic) Jakub Lustyk
- (Poland) Grzegorz Panfil
- (Czech Republic) Adam Pavlásek
- (Czech Republic) Jiří Veselý

The following players received entry from the qualifying draw:

- (Slovakia) Andrej Martin
- (Czech Republic) Marek Michalička
- (Austria) Maximilian Neuchrist
- (Slovenia) Grega Žemlja

== Champions ==
=== Singles ===
- (France) Jonathan Dasnières de Veigy def. (Czech Republic) Jan Hájek, 7–5, 6–2

=== Doubles ===
- (Moldova) Radu Albot / (Russia) Teymuraz Gabashvili def. (Czech Republic) Adam Pavlásek / (Czech Republic) Jiří Veselý, 7–5, 5–7, [10–8]
