= 2012 Mersin Cup =

- Date: 9–15 April
- Edition: 1st
- Surface: Clay
- Location: Mersin, Turkey

Champions

Singles
- (Portugal) João Sousa

Doubles
- (Moldova) Radu Albot / (Ukraine) Denys Molchanov
Mersin Cup	· 2013 →

The 2012 Mersin Cup was a professional tennis tournament played on clay courts. It was the first edition of the tournament which was part of the 2012 ATP Challenger Tour. It took place in Mersin, Turkey between 9 and 15 April 2012.

== ATP entrants ==
=== Seeds ===
Country	Player	Rank^{1}	Seed
SVK	Martin Kližan	94	1
TUR	Marsel İlhan	122	2
NED	Igor Sijsling	124	3
GER	Daniel Brands	130	4
NED	Thomas Schoorel	132	5
CZE	Jan Hájek	151	6
POR	João Sousa	171	7
ESP	Javier Martí	177	8

- ^{1} Rankings are as of April 2, 2012.

=== Other entrants ===
The following players received wildcards into the singles main draw:

- (Turkey) Can Altiner
- (Turkey) Haluk Akkoyun
- (Turkey) Barkin Yalcinkale
- (Turkey) Ergün Zorlu

The following players received entry from the qualifying draw:

- (France) Jérôme Inzerillo
- (Romania) Gabriel Moraru
- (Russia) Ivan Nedelko
- (Czech Republic) Michal Schmid

The following players received entry from the qualifying draw as a lucky loser:

- (Czech Republic) Ľubomír Majšajdr

== Champions ==
=== Singles ===
- (Portugal) João Sousa def. (Spain) Javier Martí, 6–4, 0–6, 6–4

=== Doubles ===
- (Moldova) Radu Albot / (Ukraine) Denys Molchanov def. (Italy) Alessandro Motti / (Italy) Simone Vagnozzi, 6–0, 6–2
