= 2012 Prosperita Open – Doubles =

Doubles
- 2012 Prosperita Open

Final
- Champions: (Moldova) Radu Albot (Russia) Teymuraz Gabashvili
- Runners-up: (Czech Republic) Adam Pavlásek (Czech Republic) Jiří Veselý
- Score: 7–5, 5–7, [10–8]

Events
Singles	Doubles
← 2011 ·	Prosperita Open	· 2013 →

Olivier Charroin and Stéphane Robert were the defending champions but decided not to participate this year.
Radu Albot and Teymuraz Gabashvili won the title by defeating Adam Pavlásek and Jiří Veselý 7–5, 5–7, [10–8] in the final.

== Seeds ==
1. (Germany) Andre Begemann / (Austria) Philipp Oswald (first round)
2. (Moldova) Radu Albot / (Russia) Teymuraz Gabashvili (champions)
3. (Czech Republic) Jan Hájek / (Czech Republic) David Škoch (quarterfinals)
4. (Czech Republic) Roman Jebavý / (Czech Republic) Jan Mertl (quarterfinals)

== Draw ==
Key

- Q = Qualifier
- WC = Wild card
- LL = Lucky loser
- Alt = Alternate
- ITF = ITF entry
- PR = Protected ranking
- SR = Special ranking
- SE = Special exempt
- JE = Junior exempt
- JR = Junior Accelerator Programme entrant
- CO = College Accelerator Programme entrant
- NG = Next Gen Accelerator Program entrant
- w/o = Walkover
- r = Retired
- d = Defaulted

=== Draw ===
First round
1	(Germany) A Begemann (Austria) P Oswald	6^{4}	4
WC	(Czech Republic) A Pavlásek (Czech Republic) J Veselý	7^{7}	6
WC	(Czech Republic) Marian Podeprel (Czech Republic) Martin Schulhauser	3	4
(Republic of Ireland) J Cluskey (Slovenia) G Žemlja	6	6
3	(Czech Republic) J Hájek (Czech Republic) D Škoch	7	5	[10]
(Czech Republic) D Lojda (Belgium) Y Mertens	5	7	[2]
(Canada) E Chvojka (Germany) A Satschko	5	6^{3}
PR	(Poland) M Kowalczyk (Croatia) F Škugor	7	7^{7}
(Australia) B Mitchell (Australia) M Reid	6	3	[10]
(France) Julien Obry (France) G Rufin	3	6	[7]
(Italy) Enrico Burzi (Italy) S Vagnozzi	3	6	[9]
4	(Czech Republic) R Jebavý (Czech Republic) J Mertl	6	4	[11]
(Czech Republic) Michal Konecny (Croatia) M Pavić	7^{7}	7^{9}
WC	(Austria) M Neuchrist (Croatia) A Pavić	6^{3}	6^{7}
(France) A Michon (France) M Rodrigues	2	3
2	(Moldova) R Albot (Russia) T Gabashvili	6	6

Quarterfinals
WC	(Czech Republic) A Pavlásek (Czech Republic) J Veselý	6	6
(Republic of Ireland) J Cluskey (Slovenia) G Žemlja	4	2
3	(Czech Republic) J Hájek (Czech Republic) D Škoch	3	6	[8]
PR	(Poland) M Kowalczyk (Croatia) F Škugor	6	2	[10]
(Australia) B Mitchell (Australia) M Reid	3	6	[10]
4	(Czech Republic) R Jebavý (Czech Republic) J Mertl	6	3	[3]
(Czech Republic) Michal Konecny (Croatia) M Pavić	2	4
2	(Moldova) R Albot (Russia) T Gabashvili	6	6

Semifinals
WC	(Czech Republic) A Pavlásek (Czech Republic) J Veselý	6	6
PR	(Poland) M Kowalczyk (Croatia) F Škugor	3	4
(Australia) B Mitchell (Australia) M Reid
2	(Moldova) R Albot (Russia) T Gabashvili	w/o

Final
WC	(Czech Republic) A Pavlásek (Czech Republic) J Veselý	5	7	[8]
2	(Moldova) R Albot (Russia) T Gabashvili	7	5	[10]
