= 2009 Prosperita Open – Singles =

Singles
- 2009 Prosperita Open

Final
- Champion: (Czech Republic) Jan Hájek
- Runner-up: (Croatia) Ivan Dodig
- Score: 7–5, 6–1

Events
Singles	Doubles
← 2008 ·	Prosperita Open	· 2010 →

Jiří Vaněk was the defending champion, but Ivan Dodig defeated him in the quarterfinals.
The new champion became other Czech player, Jan Hájek who won against Dodig in the final (7–5, 6–1).

== Seeds ==
1. (Cyprus) Marcos Baghdatis (first round)
2. (Czech Republic) ~~Ivo Minář~~ (withdrew)
3. (Belgium) Steve Darcis (semifinals)
4. (Belgium) Olivier Rochus (quarterfinals)
5. (Czech Republic) Jiří Vaněk (quarterfinals)
6. (Czech Republic) Lukáš Rosol (quarterfinals)
7. (Switzerland) Stéphane Bohli (first round)
8. (Argentina) Sebastián Decoud (second round)

== Draw ==
=== Key ===
- Q = Qualifier
- WC = Wild card
- LL = Lucky loser
- Alt = Alternate
- SE = Special exempt
- PR = Protected ranking
- ITF = ITF entry
- JE = Junior exempt
- w/o = Walkover
- r = Retired
- d = Defaulted
- SR = Special ranking

=== Final four ===
Semifinals
Q	(Czech Republic) Jan Hájek	7	0	6
3	(Belgium) Steve Darcis	5	6	3
(Spain) David Marrero	3	6^{4}
Q	(Croatia) Ivan Dodig	6	7

Final
Q	(Czech Republic) Jan Hájek	7	6
Q	(Croatia) Ivan Dodig	5	1

=== Top half ===
First round
1	(Cyprus) M Baghdatis	4	1
(Poland) Ł Kubot	6	6
(Argentina) JP Brzezicki	6^{4}	4
(South Africa) K Anderson	7	6
PR	(Germany) F Mayer	6^{5}	1
Q	(Czech Republic) J Hájek	7	6
(Brazil) R Mello	6	6
7	(Switzerland) S Bohli	4	4
3	(Belgium) S Darcis	7	6
LL	(Slovakia) M Semjan	5	4
(Australia) P Luczak	7	6
(France) S de Chaunac	6^{5}	1
WC	(Slovakia) M Daniš	0	1
WC	(Slovakia) M Kližan	6	6
(Brazil) R Hocevar	5	4
6	(Czech Republic) L Rosol	7	6

Second round
(Poland) Ł Kubot	6	6
(South Africa) K Anderson	3	1
Q	(Czech Republic) J Hájek	6	6
(Brazil) R Mello	4	2
3	(Belgium) S Darcis	6^{2}	6	7
(Australia) P Luczak	7	2	5
WC	(Slovakia) M Kližan	6	2	4
6	(Czech Republic) L Rosol	4	6	6

Quarterfinals
(Poland) Ł Kubot	3	6	4
Q	(Czech Republic) J Hájek	6	0	6
3	(Belgium) S Darcis	6	6
6	(Czech Republic) L Rosol	1	4

Semifinals
Q	(Czech Republic) J Hájek	7	0	6
3	(Belgium) S Darcis	5	6	3

=== Bottom half ===
First round
8	(Argentina) S Decoud	6^{7}	6	6
(Germany) J Reister	7	3	3
(Germany) T Kamke	3	2
(Spain) D Marrero	6	6
(Slovakia) D Hrbatý	2	6	6
(France) S Robert	6	1	4
(Slovenia) L Gregorc	1	3
4	(Belgium) O Rochus	6	6
5	(Czech Republic) J Vaněk	2	7	7
WC	(Czech Republic) A Vejmělka	6	5	5
Q	(Slovakia) P Červenák	4	4
(Germany) D Kindlmann	6	6
Q	(Croatia) I Dodig	4
Q	(Spain) G Alcaide	1	r
WC	(Slovakia) M Horečný	5
LL	(Slovakia) I Klec	3	r

Second round
8	(Argentina) S Decoud	2	1
(Spain) D Marrero	6	6
(Slovakia) D Hrbatý	3	4
4	(Belgium) O Rochus	6	6
5	(Czech Republic) J Vaněk	6	6
(Germany) D Kindlmann	4	3
Q	(Croatia) I Dodig	6	6
WC	(Slovakia) M Horečný	1	1

Quarterfinals
(Spain) D Marrero	6	6
4	(Belgium) O Rochus	3	3
5	(Czech Republic) J Vaněk	3	6	0
Q	(Croatia) I Dodig	6	3	6

Semifinals
(Spain) D Marrero	3	6^{4}
Q	(Croatia) I Dodig	6	7
