= 2014 Mersin Cup =

- Date: 7 – 13 April
- Edition: 3rd
- Draw: 32S / 16D
- Prize money: €42,500
- Surface: Clay
- Location: Mersin, Turkey

Champions

Singles
- (Bosnia and Herzegovina) Damir Džumhur

Doubles
- (Moldova) Radu Albot / (Czech Republic) Jaroslav Pospíšil
- Mersin Cup

The 2014 Mersin Cup was a professional tennis tournament played on clay courts. It was the third edition of the tournament which was part of the 2014 ATP Challenger Tour. It took place in Mersin, Turkey between 7 and 13 April 2014.

== Singles main-draw entrants ==
=== Seeds ===
Country	Player	Rank	Seed
ESP	Pere Riba	107	1
AUT	Andreas Haider-Maurer	108	2
SVN	Aljaž Bedene	113	3
GER	Julian Reister	115	4
ROU	Adrian Ungur	117	5
GER	Michael Berrer	124	6
TUR	Marsel İlhan	151	7
BIH	Damir Džumhur	158	8

=== Other entrants ===
The following players received wildcards into the singles main draw:

- (Turkey) Anıl Yüksel
- (Turkey) Barış Ergüden
- (Turkey) Cem İlkel
- (Turkey) Tuna Altuna

The following players received entry from the qualifying draw:

- (Austria) Nicolas Reissig
- (Russia) Philipp Davydenko
- (Austria) Michael Linzer
- (Italy) Claudio Fortuna

== Doubles main-draw entrants ==
=== Seeds ===
Country	Player	Country	Player	Rank	Seed
ITA	Riccardo Ghedin	ITA	Claudio Grassi	273	1
TPE	Lee Hsin-han	NZL	Artem Sitak	314	2
NED	Stephan Fransen	NED	Wesley Koolhof	329	3
BLR	Sergey Betov	BLR	Aliaksandr Bury	365	4

=== Other entrants ===
The following pairs received wildcards into the doubles main draw:

- (Turkey) Marsel İlhan / (Turkey) Cem İlkel
- (Turkey) Anıl Yüksel / (Turkey) Efe Yurtaçan
- (Turkey) Tuna Altuna / (Turkey) Barış Ergüden

== Champions ==
=== Singles ===
- (Bosnia and Herzegovina) Damir Džumhur def. (Spain) Pere Riba, 7–6^{(7–4)}, 6–3

=== Doubles ===
- (Moldova) Radu Albot / (Czech Republic) Jaroslav Pospíšil def. (Italy) Thomas Fabbiano / (Italy) Matteo Viola, 7–6^{(9–7)}, 6–1
