= 2014 UniCredit Czech Open – Singles =

Singles
- 2014 UniCredit Czech Open

Final
- Champion: (Czech Republic) Jiří Veselý
- Runner-up: (Slovakia) Norbert Gombos
- Score: 6–2, 6–2

Events
Singles	Doubles
← 2013 ·	UniCredit Czech Open	· 2015 →

Radek Štěpánek was the defending champion, but lost in the semifinals to Jiří Veselý.

Jiří Veselý won the title, defeating Norbert Gombos in the final, 6–2, 6–2.

== Seeds ==
1. (Czech Republic) Radek Štěpánek (semifinals)
2. (Netherlands) Robin Haase (second round)
3. (Czech Republic) Lukáš Rosol (quarterfinals)
4. (Kazakhstan) Mikhail Kukushkin (quarterfinals)
5. (United States) Bradley Klahn (first round)
6. (Czech Republic) Jiří Veselý (champion)
7. (Germany) Julian Reister (quarterfinals)
8. (India) Somdev Devvarman (first round)

== Draw ==
=== Key ===
- Q = Qualifier
- WC = Wild card
- LL = Lucky loser
- Alt = Alternate
- SE = Special exempt
- PR = Protected ranking
- ITF = ITF entry
- JE = Junior exempt
- w/o = Walkover
- r = Retired
- d = Defaulted
- SR = Special ranking

=== Finals ===
Semifinals
1/WC	(Czech Republic) Radek Štěpánek	5	6^{1}
6	(Czech Republic) Jiří Veselý	7	7^{7}
WC	(Czech Republic) Adam Pavlásek	2	2
(Slovakia) Norbert Gombos	6	6

Final
6	(Czech Republic) Jiří Veselý	6	6
(Slovakia) Norbert Gombos	2	2

=== Top half ===
First round
1/WC	(Czech Republic) R Štěpánek	3	6	6
(Argentina) F Argüello	6	0	2
WC	(Slovakia) J Kovalík	6	1	7
(Czech Republic) J Pospíšil	1	6	5
(Canada) P Polansky	3	6	6
(Argentina) A Velotti	6	3	2
(France) A Michon	6	6
8	(India) S Devvarman	3	0
4	(Kazakhstan) M Kukushkin	2	7^{7}	6
(Czech Republic) J Hernych	6	6^{3}	3
Alt	(Monaco) B Balleret	4	1
(Kazakhstan) O Nedovyesov	6	6
(Belgium) G Gigounon	6	6^{2}	6
(Slovakia) M Mečíř Jr.	4	7^{7}	2
Q	(France) T Lamasine	2	2
6	(Czech Republic) J Veselý	6	6

Second round
1/WC	(Czech Republic) R Štěpánek	6	6
WC	(Slovakia) J Kovalík	1	4
(Canada) P Polansky	5	4
(France) A Michon	7	6
4	(Kazakhstan) M Kukushkin	5	6	6
(Kazakhstan) O Nedovyesov	7	1	3
(Belgium) G Gigounon	4	2
6	(Czech Republic) J Veselý	6	6

Quarterfinals
1/WC	(Czech Republic) R Štěpánek	7^{7}	6
(France) A Michon	6^{1}	4
4	(Kazakhstan) M Kukushkin	0	5
6	(Czech Republic) J Veselý	6	7

Semifinals
1/WC	(Czech Republic) R Štěpánek	5	6^{1}
6	(Czech Republic) J Veselý	7	7^{7}

=== Bottom half ===
First round
5	(United States) B Klahn	3	3
WC	(Czech Republic) A Pavlásek	6	6
(Brazil) J Souza	6	5	6
Alt	(Greece) T Angelinos	4	7	4
Q	(Czech Republic) Daniel Knoflíček	6^{8}	2
Alt	(Brazil) R Hocevar	7^{10}	6
Q	(France) Julien Obry	4	3
3	(Czech Republic) L Rosol	6	6
7	(Germany) J Reister	6	6
(Czech Republic) J Mertl	3	2
(France) V Millot	3	4
(Germany) M Bachinger	6	6
Q	(Czech Republic) Michal Konečný	2	1
(Slovakia) N Gombos	6	6
(Germany) P Gojowczyk	4	3
2/WC	(Netherlands) R Haase	6	6

Second round
WC	(Czech Republic) A Pavlásek	2	6	6
(Brazil) J Souza	6	3	3
Alt	(Brazil) R Hocevar	6^{4}	4
3	(Czech Republic) L Rosol	7^{7}	6
7	(Germany) J Reister	5	6	6
(Germany) M Bachinger	7	3	3
(Slovakia) N Gombos	5	6	7
2/WC	(Netherlands) R Haase	7	4	5

Quarterfinals
WC	(Czech Republic) A Pavlásek	5	7^{7}	6
3	(Czech Republic) L Rosol	7	6^{4}	4
7	(Germany) J Reister	6	6^{4}	1
(Slovakia) N Gombos	1	7^{7}	6

Semifinals
WC	(Czech Republic) A Pavlásek	2	2
(Slovakia) N Gombos	6	6
