= 2009 Prosperita Open =

- Date: April 27 – March 03
- Edition: 6th
- Location: Ostrava, Czech Republic

Champions

Singles
- (Czech Republic) Jan Hájek

Doubles
- (Czech Republic) Jan Hájek / (Czech Republic) Robin Vik
← 2008 ·	Prosperita Open	· 2010 →

The 2009 Prosperita Open was a professional tennis tournament played on Hard courts. It was part of the 2009 ATP Challenger Tour. It took place in Ostrava, Czech Republic between April 27 and March 3, 2009.

== Singles entrants ==
=== Seeds ===
Nationality	Player	Ranking*	Seeding
CYP	Marcos Baghdatis	95	1
CZE	~~Ivo Minář~~	~~96~~	~~2~~
BEL	Steve Darcis	97	3
BEL	Olivier Rochus	119	4
CZE	Jiří Vaněk	129	5
CZE	Lukáš Rosol	139	6
SUI	Stéphane Bohli	143	7
ARG	Sebastián Decoud	159	8

- Rankings are as of April 20, 2009.

=== Other entrants ===
The following players received wildcards into the singles main draw:

- (Slovakia) Marc Denis
- (Slovakia) Matúš Horecný
- (Slovakia) Martin Kližan
- (Czech Republic) Adam Vejmělka

The following players received entry from the qualifying draw:

- (Spain) Guillermo Alcaide
- (Slovakia) Pavol Červenák
- (Croatia) Ivan Dodig
- (Czech Republic) Jan Hájek

The following players received entry from lucky loser draw:

- (Slovakia) Ivo Klec
- (Slovakia) Marek Semjan

== Champions ==
=== Men's singles ===
(Czech Republic) Jan Hájek def. (Croatia) Ivan Dodig, 7–5, 6–1.

=== Men's doubles ===
(Czech Republic) Jan Hájek / (Czech Republic) Robin Vik def. (Slovakia) Matúš Horecný / (Slovakia) Tomáš Janci, 6–2, 6–4.
