= 2009 Prosperita Open – Doubles =

Doubles
- 2009 Prosperita Open

Final
- Champions: (Czech Republic) Jan Hájek (Czech Republic) Robin Vik
- Runners-up: (Slovakia) Matúš Horecný (Slovakia) Tomáš Janci
- Score: 6–2, 6–4

Events
Singles	Doubles
- Prosperita Open

Sergiy Stakhovsky and Tomáš Zíb were the defenders of title, but they didn't play this time. Jan Hájek and Robin Vik won in the final 6–2, 6–4, against Matúš Horecný and Tomáš Janci.

== Seeds ==
1. (United States) Travis Parrott / (Slovakia) Filip Polášek (semifinals, withdrew)
2. (South Africa) Kevin Anderson / (United States) David Martin (semifinals)
3. (Argentina) Juan Pablo Brzezicki / (Spain) David Marrero (quarterfinals)
4. (Czech Republic) Dušan Karol / (Czech Republic) Lukáš Rosol (first round)

== Draw ==
Key

- Q = Qualifier
- WC = Wild card
- LL = Lucky loser
- Alt = Alternate
- ITF = ITF entry
- PR = Protected ranking
- SR = Special ranking
- SE = Special exempt
- JE = Junior exempt
- JR = Junior Accelerator Programme entrant
- CO = College Accelerator Programme entrant
- NG = Next Gen Accelerator Program entrant
- w/o = Walkover
- r = Retired
- d = Defaulted

=== Draw ===
First round
1	(United States) T Parrott (Slovakia) F Polášek	6	3	[10]
(Brazil) R Hocevar (Brazil) R Mello	3	6	[7]
(Slovakia) P Červenák (Slovakia) I Klec	7	4	[6]
(Russia) P Chekhov (Russia) V Rudnev	6^{3}	6	[10]
3	(Argentina) JP Brzezicki (Spain) D Marrero	4	6	[11]
(Argentina) S Decoud (France) S Robert	6	4	[9]
WC	(Slovakia) M Horečný (Slovakia) T Janči	6	6
(Germany) T Kamke (Germany) J Reister	2	1
(Slovakia) M Daniš (Slovakia) M Kližan	1	1
WC	(Czech Republic) L Friedl (Czech Republic) M Tabara	6	6
(Czech Republic) J Hájek (Czech Republic) R Vik	6	3	[10]
4	(Czech Republic) D Karol (Czech Republic) L Rosol	3	6	[6]
(Croatia) I Dodig (Slovakia) M Semjan	7	2	[10]
(Cyprus) M Baghdatis (France) S de Chaunac	5	6	[7]
(Poland) T Bednarek (Poland) M Przysiężny	5	4
2	(South Africa) K Anderson (United States) D Martin	7	6

Quarterfinals
1	(United States) T Parrott (Slovakia) F Polášek	7	7
(Russia) P Chekhov (Russia) V Rudnev	6^{4}	5
3	(Argentina) JP Brzezicki (Spain) D Marrero	7	3	[7]
WC	(Slovakia) M Horečný (Slovakia) T Janči	6^{4}	6	[10]
WC	(Czech Republic) L Friedl (Czech Republic) M Tabara	1	2
(Czech Republic) J Hájek (Czech Republic) R Vik	6	6
(Croatia) I Dodig (Slovakia) M Semjan	1	5
2	(South Africa) K Anderson (United States) D Martin	6	7

Semifinals
1	(United States) T Parrott (Slovakia) F Polášek
WC	(Slovakia) M Horečný (Slovakia) T Janči	w/o
(Czech Republic) J Hájek (Czech Republic) R Vik	7	6
2	(South Africa) K Anderson (United States) D Martin	6^{3}	3

Finals
WC	(Slovakia) M Horečný (Slovakia) T Janči	2	4
(Czech Republic) J Hájek (Czech Republic) R Vik	6	6
