= 2014 UniCredit Czech Open =

- Date: 2–7 June
- Edition: 21
- Draw: 32S / 16D
- Prize money: €106,500+H
- Surface: Clay
- Location: Prostějov, Czech Republic
- Venue: TK Agrofert Prostějov

Champions

Singles
- (Czech Republic) Jiří Veselý

Doubles
- (Germany) Andre Begemann / (Czech Republic) Lukáš Rosol
- UniCredit Czech Open

The 2014 UniCredit Czech Open was a professional tennis tournament played on clay courts. It was the 21st edition of the tournament which was part of the 2014 ATP Challenger Tour. It took place in Prostějov, Czech Republic between 2 and 7 June 2014.

== Singles main-draw entrants ==
=== Seeds ===
Country	Player	Rank^{1}	Seed
CZE	Radek Štěpánek	43	1
NED	Robin Haase	50	2
CZE	Lukáš Rosol	52	3
KAZ	Mikhail Kukushkin	54	4
USA	Bradley Klahn	71	5
CZE	Jiří Veselý	81	6
GER	Julian Reister	91	7
IND	Somdev Devvarman	96	8

- ^{1} Rankings are as of May 26, 2014.

=== Other entrants ===
The following players received wildcards into the singles main draw:

- (Netherlands) Robin Haase
- (Czech Republic) Adam Pavlásek
- (Czech Republic) Radek Štěpánek
- (Slovakia) Jozef Kovalík

The following players received entry as alternates into the singles main draw:

- (Greece) Theodoros Angelopoulos
- (Monaco) Benjamin Balleret
- (Brazil) Ricardo Hocevar

The following players received entry from the qualifying draw:

- (France) Tristan Lamasine
- (Czech Republic) Daniel Knoflicek
- (France) Julien Obry
- (Czech Republic) Michal Konečný

== Doubles main-draw entrants ==
=== Seeds ===
Country	Player	Country	Player	Rank^{1}	Seed
POL	Tomasz Bednarek	CZE	Lukáš Dlouhý	101	1
GER	Andre Begemann	CZE	Lukáš Rosol	102	2
GER	Martin Emmrich	GER	Christopher Kas	111	3
CZE	František Čermák	RUS	Mikhail Elgin	123	4

- ^{1} Rankings as of May 26, 2014.

=== Other entrants ===
The following pairs received wildcards into the doubles main draw:

- (Czech Republic) Zdeněk Kolář / (Czech Republic) David Poljak
- (Czech Republic) Michal Konečný / (Czech Republic) Jaroslav Pospíšil
- (Czech Republic) Adam Pavlásek / (Czech Republic) Jiří Veselý

== Champions ==
=== Singles ===
- (Czech Republic) Jiří Veselý def. (Slovakia) Norbert Gombos, 6–2, 6–2

=== Doubles ===
- (Germany) Andre Begemann / (Czech Republic) Lukáš Rosol def. (Canada) Peter Polansky / (Canada) Adil Shamasdin, 6–1, 6–2
