= 2011 Prosperita Open =

- Date: April 25 – May 1
- Edition: 8th
- Location: Ostrava, Czech Republic

Champions

Singles
- (France) Stéphane Robert

Doubles
- (France) Olivier Charroin / (France) Stéphane Robert
- Prosperita Open

The 2011 Prosperita Open was a professional tennis tournament played on clay courts. It was the eighth edition of the tournament which was part of the 2011 ATP Challenger Tour. It took place in Ostrava, Czech Republic between April 25 – May 1, 2011.

== ATP entrants ==
=== Seeds ===
Country	Player	Rank^{1}	Seed
CZE	Jaroslav Pospíšil	114	1
SVK	Lukáš Lacko	118	2
FRA	Benoît Paire	119	3
CZE	Ivo Minář	122	4
CZE	Lukáš Rosol	124	5
SVK	Karol Beck	131	6
RUS	Alexander Kudryavtsev	138	7
FRA	David Guez	166	8

- Rankings are as of April 18, 2011.

=== Other entrants ===
The following players received wildcards into the singles main draw:

- (Czech Republic) Lukáš Dlouhý
- (Czech Republic) Martin Přikryl
- (Austria) Nicolas Reissig
- (Czech Republic) Jiří Veselý

The following players received entry from the qualifying draw:

- (Slovakia) Kamil Čapkovič
- (Slovakia) Pavol Červenák
- (Latvia) Andis Juška
- (Hungary) Ádám Kellner

== Champions ==
=== Singles ===
(France) Stéphane Robert def. (Hungary) Ádám Kellner, 6–1, 6–3

=== Doubles ===
(France) Olivier Charroin / (France) Stéphane Robert def. (Latvia) Andis Juška / (Russia) Alexander Kudryavtsev, 6–4, 6–3
