= 2010 Prosperita Open – Doubles =

Doubles
- 2010 Prosperita Open

Final
- Champions: (Austria) Martin Fischer (Austria) Philipp Oswald
- Runners-up: (Poland) Tomasz Bednarek (Poland) Mateusz Kowalczyk
- Score: 2–6, 7–6(6), [10–8]

Events
| Singles | Doubles |
- Prosperita Open

Jan Hájek and Robin Vik were the defending champions; however, Hajek chose to compete in Rome instead and Vik chose not to compete this year.
Martin Fischer and Philipp Oswald won in the final 2–6, 7–6(6), [10–8], against Tomasz Bednarek and Mateusz Kowalczyk.

== Seeds ==
1. (Germany) Philipp Marx / (Slovakia) Igor Zelenay (quarterfinals)
2. (Poland) Tomasz Bednarek / (Poland) Mateusz Kowalczyk (final)
3. (Austria) Martin Fischer / (Austria) Philipp Oswald (champions)
4. (Argentina) Juan Pablo Brzezicki / (Spain) David Marrero (first round)

== Draw ==
Key

- Q = Qualifier
- WC = Wild card
- LL = Lucky loser
- Alt = Alternate
- ITF = ITF entry
- PR = Protected ranking
- SR = Special ranking
- SE = Special exempt
- JE = Junior exempt
- JR = Junior Accelerator Programme entrant
- CO = College Accelerator Programme entrant
- NG = Next Gen Accelerator Program entrant
- w/o = Walkover
- r = Retired
- d = Defaulted

=== Draw ===
First round
1 | (Germany) P Marx (Slovakia) I Zelenay | 6^{5} | 6 | [10]
(Croatia) N Mektić (Croatia) A Veić | 7 | 0 | [6]
(Czech Republic) J Pospíšil (Czech Republic) P Šnobel | 3 | 2
(Australia) S Kadir (Czech Republic) L Rosol | 6 | 6
3 | (Austria) M Fischer (Austria) P Oswald | 6 | 6
(Czech Republic) R Jebavý (Slovakia) Adrian Sikora | 1 | 4
(France) J Dasnières de Veigy (France) D Guez | 4 | 5
(Hungary) A Balázs (Serbia) D Savić | 6 | 7
(Croatia) M Ančić (Croatia) I Zovko
(Russia) T Gabashvili (Poland) D Olejniczak | w/o
WC | (Serbia) F Krajinović (Czech Republic) M Přikryl | 6 | 1 | [10]
4 | (Argentina) JP Brzezicki (Spain) D Marrero | 4 | 6 | [5]
(Czech Republic) J Hernych (Czech Republic) J Mertl | 6 | 6
(Slovakia) P Červenák (Belgium) Y Mertens | 2 | 2
(Belarus) U Ignatik (Slovakia) M Kližan | 6^{2} | 4
2 | (Poland) T Bednarek (Poland) M Kowalczyk | 7 | 6

Quarterfinals
1 | (Germany) P Marx (Slovakia) I Zelenay | 3 | 4
(Australia) S Kadir (Czech Republic) L Rosol | 6 | 6
3 | (Austria) M Fischer (Austria) P Oswald | 6 | 6
(Hungary) A Balázs (Serbia) D Savić | 1 | 4
(Croatia) M Ančić (Croatia) I Zovko | 6 | 6
WC | (Serbia) F Krajinović (Czech Republic) M Přikryl | 4 | 2
(Czech Republic) J Hernych (Czech Republic) J Mertl | 6^{0} | 6 | [5]
2 | (Poland) T Bednarek (Poland) M Kowalczyk | 7 | 1 | [10]

Semifinals
(Australia) S Kadir (Czech Republic) L Rosol | 5 | 5
3 | (Austria) M Fischer (Austria) P Oswald | 7 | 7
(Croatia) M Ančić (Croatia) I Zovko | 7 | 4 | [8]
2 | (Poland) T Bednarek (Poland) M Kowalczyk | 6^{0} | 6 | [10]

Finals
3 | (Austria) M Fischer (Austria) P Oswald | 2 | 7 | [10]
2 | (Poland) T Bednarek (Poland) M Kowalczyk | 6 | 6^{6} | [8]
