= Mersin Cup =

Defunct tennis tournament
- Location: Mersin, Turkey
- Category: ATP Challenger Tour
- Surface: Clay
- Draw: 32S/8Q/16D
- Prize money: €42,500
- Website: Website

The Mersin Cup was a tennis tournament held in Mersin, Turkey from 2012 until 2015. The event was part of the ATP Challenger Tour and was played on clay courts.

== Past finals ==
=== Singles ===
| Year | Champion | Runner-up | Score | Ref. |
|---|---|---|---|---|
| 2015 | (Belgium) Kimmer Coppejans | (Turkey) Marsel İlhan | 6–2, 6–2 | |
| 2014 | (Bosnia and Herzegovina) Damir Džumhur | (Spain) Pere Riba | 7–6^{(7–4)}, 6–3 | |
| 2013 | (Czech Republic) Jiří Veselý | (Germany) Simon Greul | 6–1, 6–1 | |
| 2012 | (Portugal) João Sousa | (Spain) Javier Martí | 6–4, 0–6, 6–4 | |

=== Doubles ===
| Year | Champions | Runners-up | Score |
|---|---|---|---|
| 2015 | (Croatia) Mate Pavić (New Zealand) Michael Venus | (Italy) Riccardo Ghedin (India) Ramkumar Ramanathan | 5–7, 6–3, [10–4] |
| 2014 | (Moldova) Radu Albot (Czech Republic) Jaroslav Pospíšil | (Italy) Thomas Fabbiano (Italy) Matteo Viola | 7–6^{(9–7)}, 6–1 |
| 2013 | (Germany) Andreas Beck (Germany) Dominik Meffert | (Moldova) Radu Albot (Ukraine) Oleksandr Nedovyesov | 5–7, 6–3, [10–8] |
| 2012 | (Moldova) Radu Albot (Ukraine) Denys Molchanov | (Italy) Alessandro Motti (Italy) Simone Vagnozzi | 6–0, 6–2 |
