= Tuna Altuna =

Turkish tennis player (born 1989)

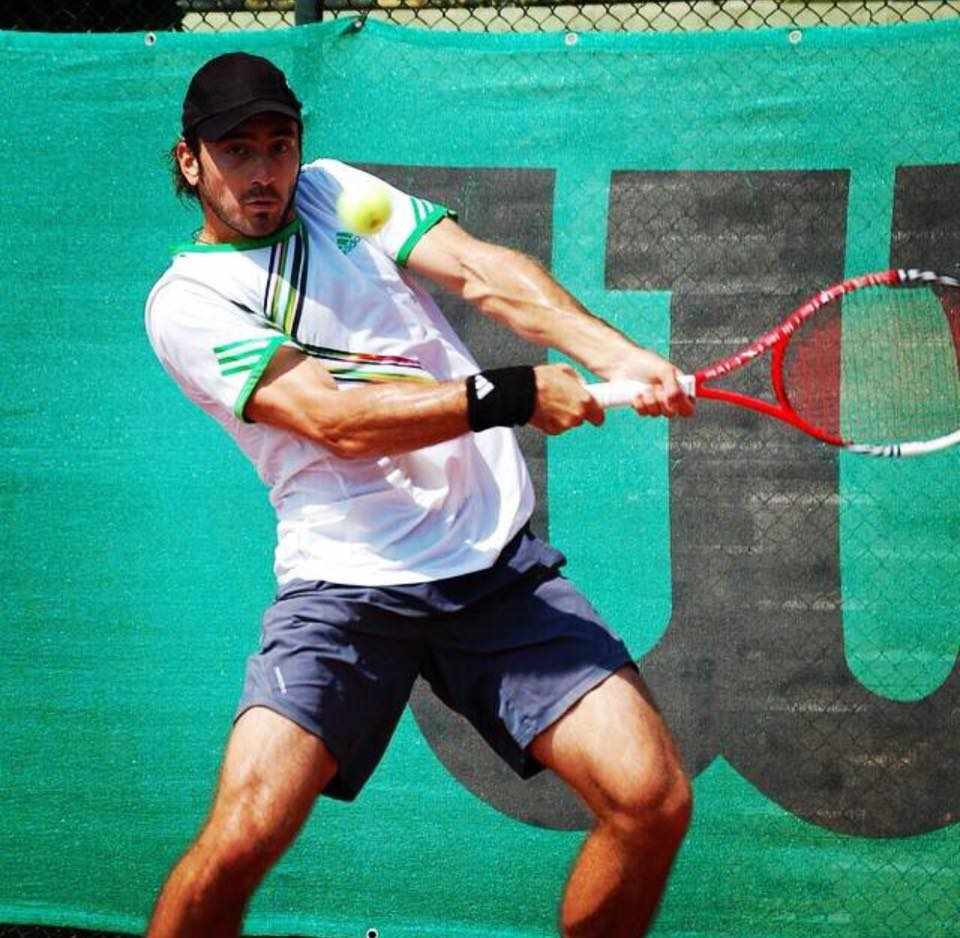
- Full name: Tuna Altuna
- Country (sports): Turkey
- Residence: Istanbul, Turkey
- Born: 30 January 1989 (age 36); Istanbul, Turkey
- Plays: Right-handed (two handed-backhand)
- Prize money: $85,352

Singles
- Career record: 0–1 (at ATP Tour level, Grand Slam level, and in Davis Cup)
- Career titles: 1 ITF
- Highest ranking: No. 651 (9 September 2013)

Doubles
- Career record: 5–11 (at ATP Tour level, Grand Slam level, and in Davis Cup)
- Career titles: 13 ITF
- Highest ranking: No. 169 (30 April 2018)
- Current ranking: No. 690 (20 June 2022)
- Last updated on: 20 June 2022.

Tuna Altuna (born 30 January 1989 in Istanbul) is a Turkish tennis player.

Altuna has a career high ATP singles ranking of 651 achieved on 9 September 2013. He also has a career high ATP doubles ranking of 355 achieved on 28 December 2015. In February 2016 he entered the doubles main draw of the inaugural ATP Garanti Koza Sofia Open in Sofia, Bulgaria. Alongside Konstantin Kravchuk, they lost in the quarterfinals against Philipp Oswald and Adil Shamasdin.

Playing for Turkey in Davis Cup, Altuna has a W/L record of 1–1.

== ATP career finals ==
=== Doubles: 1 (1 runner-up) ===
Legend Grand Slam Tournaments (0–0) ATP World Tour Finals (0–0) ATP World Tour Masters 1000 (0–0) ATP World Tour 500 Series (0–0) ATP World Tour 250 Series (0–1)	Finals by surface Hard (0–0) Clay (0–1) Grass (0–0) Carpet (0–0)

Result	W–L	Date	Tournament	Tier	Surface	Partner	Opponents	Score
Loss	0–1	May 2017	Istanbul Open, Turkey	250 Series	Clay	(Italy) Alessandro Motti	(Czech Republic) Roman Jebavý (Czech Republic) Jiří Veselý	0–6, 0–6
