= Jiří Veselý =

Czech tennis player (born 1993)

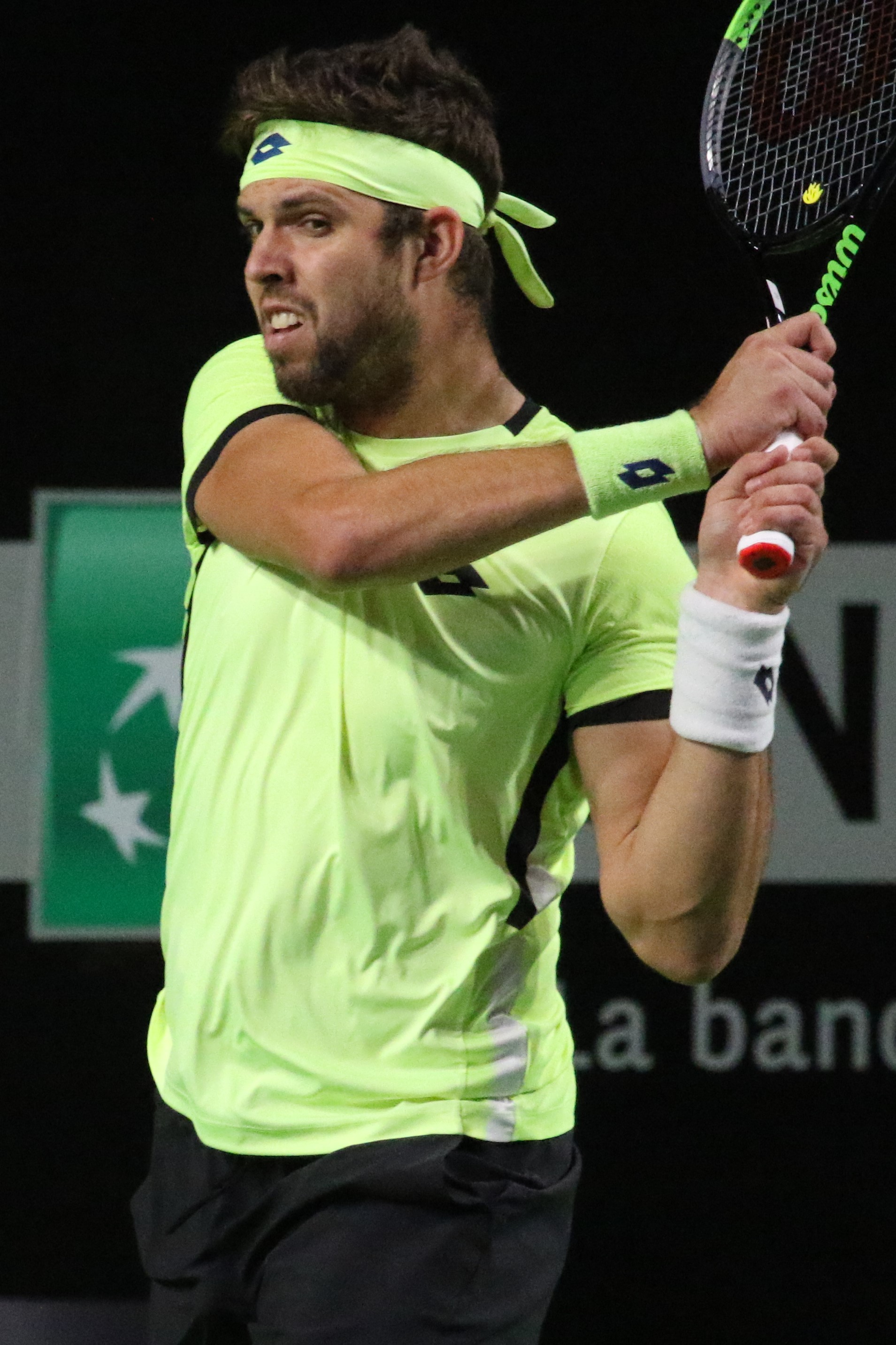
- Veselý at the 2021 Internationaux de Tennis de Vendée
- Country (sports): Czech Republic
- Residence: Březnice, Czech Republic
- Born: 10 July 1993 (age 33) Příbram, Czech Republic
- Height: 1.98 m (6 ft 6 in)
- Turned pro: 2009
- Plays: Left-handed (two-handed backhand)
- Coach: Emanuel Rehola (2023–), Jaroslav Navrátil, Dušan Lojda (2021–2023)
- Prize money: US $6,105,681

Singles
- Career record: 143–169
- Career titles: 2
- Highest ranking: No. 35 (27 April 2015)

Grand Slam singles results
- Australian Open: 2R (2018, 2021)
- French Open: 3R (2017)
- Wimbledon: 4R (2016, 2018)
- US Open: 3R (2015, 2023)

Doubles
- Career record: 39–66
- Career titles: 2
- Highest ranking: No. 94 (8 June 2015)

Grand Slam doubles results
- Australian Open: 2R (2016)
- French Open: 3R (2017)
- Wimbledon: 2R (2014)
- US Open: 2R (2013, 2014, 2015)

Team competitions
- Davis Cup: W (2013)
- Last updated on: 17 August 2026.

Medal record

Men's tennis

Representing a mixed-NOCs team

Youth Olympic Games
Gold medal – first place	2010 Singapore	Doubles

Jiří Veselý (Czech pronunciation: [ˈjɪr̝iː ˈvɛsɛliː]; born 10 July 1993) is a Czech inactive professional tennis player. He reached a career-high singles ranking of world No. 35 on 27 April 2015. Veselý is best known for being one of the two players to have defeated Novak Djokovic multiple times with no losses throughout his career (along with Marat Safin).

== Career ==
=== 2009–2011: Juniors ===
Veselý reached the No. 1 junior combined world ranking in January 2011, compiling a singles win–loss record of 125–45.

=== 2012–2015: Grand Slam debut, first singles and doubles titles, Top 35 ===
Veselý made his Davis Cup debut for Czech Republic in February 2013, and to date has nine singles titles on the ITF Futures circuit to his name and three Challengers.

Veselý qualified into the 2013 French Open for his first appearance into the main draw of a Grand Slam. Vesely was, at the time, the youngest player in the world's top 100 at 20 years and 3 months old. In 2014, Veselý reached the third round of the 2013 BNP Paribas Open where he lost to Andy Murray in three sets.

Veselý won his first Grand Slam match at the 2014 French Open, then the following month reached the third round of a Major for the first time in his career at the 2014 Wimbledon Championships as a wildcard. He beat Gaël Monfils in five sets in the second round, before being defeated by fellow wildcard Nick Kyrgios in four sets. He also won his first ATP doubles title at the 2014 Kremlin Cup with countryman František Čermák.

Veselý reached two singles finals at ATP World Tour, winning his first title at the 2015 Heineken Open in Auckland, after defeating Adrian Mannarino.

He reached the third round of a Major for the second time in his career at the 2015 Us Open and first at this Major, with a victory over Ivo Karlović.

=== 2016: Win over world No. 1, Wimbledon fourth round ===
Veselý represented the Czech Republic at the 2016 Hopman Cup alongside Karolína Plíšková. He recorded a singles win over Lleyton Hewitt of Australia, however was defeated by Alexandr Dolgopolov of Ukraine and Jack Sock of the United States.

At the Monte Carlo, he stunned world No. 1 Novak Djokovic in his opening round in three sets. It was the first time Djokovic had lost at a Masters tournament prior to the final since the 2014 Shanghai Masters, and his earliest exit from any tournament in three years. However, he lost to Gaël Monfils in straights sets in the third round. Veselý made it to the third round of the 2016 Istanbul Open – Singles before losing to Grigor Dimitrov. At the Nice Open, he lost to Leonardo Mayer in the first round. Veselý made it to the second round of the 2016 French Open by beating Rajeev Ram in the first round. He lost to Nicolás Almagro.

Veselý started his grass court season at 2016 Aegon Championships by losing to Kevin Anderson in qualifying, but earned the lucky loser spot. He beat Jérémy Chardy in the first round before falling to Milos Raonic in the second round. He next competed at the 2016 Nottingham Open. He beat Horacio Zeballos, but lost to 8th seeded Gilles Müller in the second.

At the 2016 Wimbledon Championships, Jiří pushed through 3 consecutive tie-broken sets, besting world No. 8 Dominic Thiem, to move through to the third round. It was his second top 10 win of his career after beating Novak Djokovic earlier in the season. He defeated the 31st seed João Sousa in the third round. Jiří lost to fellow countryman Tomáš Berdych in a hard-fought five set match.

Veselý next competed at the 2016 Davis Cup representing his country. He lost both of his matches to the French.

Veselý was seeded 8th at the 2016 Croatia Open. In the first round, he won in straight sets, but was forced to retire in the second round against Carlos Berlocq due to injury. He next competed at the 2016 Western & Southern Open where he lost in the first round to Marcel Granollers. The 2016 Winston-Salem Open proved dreadful for him as he was forced to retire again during his match in the third round to Andrey Kuznetsov. He was able to Compete at the 2016 US Open. He beat Saketh Myneni in the first round and set up a rematch of Monte Carlo with world number one Novak Djokovic. However, Veselý pulled out before the match was set to begin because of a left arm injury.

His first tournament since the US Open was the 2016 Shenzhen Open, where he was seeded 8th. He won his first two matches in straight sets, but lost to his idol and countryman Tomáš Berdych in three sets. He finished his season by competing at the 2016 Japan Open. Jiří won his first round match against Kevin Anderson in three sets before losing to David Goffin in the second round.

=== 2017–2020: Second doubles title, second singles title & first since 2015 ===
Veselý won his second doubles title partnering Roman Jebavý at the 2017 Istanbul Open.

Veselý started off 2020 by playing on the ATP Challenger tour, advancing to the quarterfinals in 2020 Bangkok Challenger II, before losing to eventual champion Federico Gaio in straight sets. He then entered the main draw in 2020 Maharashtra Open. He opened his campaign by defeating wildcard Arjun Kadhe, then beat 7th seed Salvatore Caruso in straight sets, before saving a match point in the final tiebreak to defeat Ilya Ivashka in 3 tight sets. In the semifinals, he once again required 3 sets, saving 4 match points to defeat Ričardas Berankis, to advance to his first tour-level final since April 2015. He defeated Egor Gerasimov in 3 sets to win the title.

=== 2022: Second victory over Djokovic, first ATP 500 final ===
Veselý started his 2022 season at the Adelaide International 1. He lost in the first round to sixth seed Tommy Paul. Getting past qualifying at the Sydney Classic, he was defeated in the first round by Brandon Nakashima. At the Australian Open, he was eliminated from the tournament in the first round by American wildcard Stefan Kozlov.

Seeded fourth and defending champion from when the Maharashtra Open was last held in 2020, Veselý failed to defend his title; he lost in the quarterfinals to sixth seed and eventual finalist, Emil Ruusuvuori. As a result, his ranking fell from 80 to 123; he exited the top 100 for the first time since the beginning of 2020. In February, as the top seed at the Bengaluru Open, he retired after losing the first set to opponent, sixth seed Enzo Couacaud, due to fatigue caused by a bout of food poisoning.

In Doha, he lost in the first round to Arthur Rinderknech. Ranked World No. 123 at the time, Veselý qualified for the Dubai Championships by defeating Hady Habib and Alexei Popyrin. He reached the quarterfinals with victories over world No. 24 Marin Čilić and eighth seed and world No. 15, Roberto Bautista Agut. In the quarterfinals, he recorded his second career victory over Novak Djokovic, defeating the World No. 1 in straight sets to reach the semifinal, his first since 2020 in Pune. This victory also allowed Daniil Medvedev to ascend to the World No. 1 ranking, marking the first time a male player outside the Big Four held the number 1 ranking since Andy Roddick in 2004. He then defeated sixth seed and world No. 14, Denis Shapovalov, in three sets to reach his first ATP 500 final claiming his third top-20 win in the tournament. He lost the final in straight sets to second seed and world No. 7, Andrey Rublev. After the tournament, his ranking improved from 123 to 74.

In March, Veselý competed at the Challenger di Roseto degli Abruzzi II. As the top seed, he lost in the first round to Nino Serdarušić. Seeded fourth at the Andalucía Challenger, he reached the semifinals where he was defeated by Jaume Munar. At the Grand Prix Hassan II in Marrakesh, he retired in the third set during his first-round match against Malek Jaziri. In Estoril, he lost in the first round to qualifier Hugo Dellien. At the Mutua Madrid Open, he fell in the first round of qualifying to David Goffin. At Roland Garros, he was beaten in the first round by Steve Johnson.

Veselý started his grass-court season at the Nottingham Open. Seeded second, he lost in the first round to British tennis player, Ryan Peniston. Seeded second at the Ilkley Trophy, he made it to the quarterfinals where he was defeated by fifth seed and eventual finalist, Jack Sock. At Wimbledon, he reached the third round where he lost to 30th seed and world No. 32, Tommy Paul.

After Wimbledon, Veselý played at the Hall of Fame Open. Seeded seventh, he withdrew from his second-round match against Steve Johnson.

In August, Veselý competed at the Odlum Brown Vancouver Open. Seeded second, he lost in the second round to Gilles Simon. Seeded second at the Championnats Banque Nationale de Granby, he was defeated in the first round by American qualifier Aidan Mayo. At the US Open, he lost in the first round to 20th seed and world No. 23, Dan Evans.

=== 2023–25: Return to the Tour, Major third round, back to top 300, hiatus ===
Veselý entered the 2023 Surbiton Trophy using protected ranking. He won his first ATP tour level match after his return at the 2023 Wimbledon Championships defeating 22nd seed Sebastian Korda also with protected ranking. Again using his protected ranking, Veselý matched his best performance in the US Open by reaching the third round. He defeated qualifier Enzo Couacaud and 20th seed Francisco Cerúndolo, both in five sets but lost to qualifier Borna Gojo.

== Coaches ==
Veselý's former coaches were Jaroslav Navrátil and Dušan Lojda. In December 2015, Veselý began to work with Tomáš Krupa, formerly the longtime coach of Tomáš Berdych.

== Performance timelines ==
Key
W	F	SF	QF	#R	RR	Q#	P#	DNQ	A	Z#	PO	G	S	B	NMS	NTI	P	NH

(W) winner; (F) finalist; (SF) semifinalist; (QF) quarterfinalist; (#R) rounds 4, 3, 2, 1; (RR) round-robin stage; (Q#) qualification round; (P#) preliminary round; (DNQ) did not qualify; (A) absent; (Z#) Davis/Fed Cup Zonal Group (with number indication) or (PO) play-off; (G) gold, (S) silver or (B) bronze Olympic/Paralympic medal; (NMS) not a Masters tournament; (NTI) not a Tier I tournament; (P) postponed; (NH) not held; (SR) strike rate (events won / competed); (W–L) win–loss record.
To avoid confusion and double counting, these charts are updated at the conclusion of a tournament or when the player's participation has ended.

=== Singles ===
Current through the 2024 Australian Open.

Tournament	2012	2013	2014	2015	2016	2017	2018	2019	2020	2021	2022	2023	2024	SR	W–L
Grand Slam tournaments
Australian Open	Q1	A	1R	1R	1R	1R	2R	1R	A	2R	1R	A	1R	0 / 9	2–9
French Open	A	1R	2R	1R	2R	3R	1R	1R	2R	1R	1R	1R	A	0 / 11	5–11
Wimbledon	A	Q2	3R	2R	4R	2R	4R	3R	NH	2R	3R	2R	Q2	0 / 9	16–9
US Open	A	1R	1R	3R	2R (Note: Veselý's 2016 US Open withdrawal does not count in his performance record.)	1R	A	1R	1R	1R	1R	3R	A	0 / 10	5–9
Win–loss	0–0	0–2	3–4	3–4	5–3	3–4	4–3	2–4	1–2	2–4	2–4	3–3	0–1	0 / 39	28–38
ATP Masters 1000
Indian Wells Open	A	A	3R	1R	1R	2R	1R	A	NH	A	A	A		0 / 5	3–5
Miami Open	A	A	2R	1R	1R	3R	2R	A	NH	1R	A	A		0 / 6	4–6
Monte-Carlo Masters	A	A	A	1R	3R	2R	A	A	NH	Q1	A	A		0 / 3	3–3
Madrid Open	A	A	A	1R	A	A	A	A	NH	A	Q1	A		0 / 1	0–1
Italian Open	A	A	A	2R	A	2R	A	A	A	A	A	A		0 / 2	2–2
Canadian Open	A	A	A	A	A	A	A	A	NH	A	A	A		0 / 0	0–0
Cincinnati Open	A	A	A	1R	1R	1R	A	A	A	A	A	A		0 / 3	0–3
Shanghai Masters	A	A	A	A	A	1R	A	A	NH		A	A		0 / 1	0–1
Paris Masters	A	A	A	1R	A	A	A	A	A	A	A	A		0 / 1	0–1
Win–loss	0–0	0–0	3–2	1–7	2–4	5–6	1–2	0–0	0–0	0–1	0–0	0–0		0 / 22	12–22
Career statistics
	2012	2013	2014	2015	2016	2017	2018	2019	2020	2021	2022	2023	2024	Career	
Tournaments	0	5	17	29	21	24	17	11	7	15	12	4	1	Career total: 163	
Titles	0	0	0	1	0	0	0	0	1	0	0	0	0	Career total: 2	
Finals	0	0	0	2	0	0	0	0	1	0	1	0	0	Career total: 4	
Overall win–loss	0–0	0–7	16–17	24–30	21–22	24–26	16–18	9–11	12–6	10–16	8–11	3–4	0–1	2 / 163	143–169
Win %	–	0%	48%	44%	49%	48%	47%	45%	67%	38%	42%	43%	0%	Career total: 46%	
Year-end ranking	263	85	66	41	55	62	89	105	68	82	112	292	337	$6,105,681	

=== Doubles ===
Current through the 2022 Qatar ExxonMobil Open.

Tournament	2013	2014	2015	2016	2017	2018	2019	2020	2021	2022	W–L
Grand Slam tournaments
Australian Open	A	A	1R	2R	1R	1R	A	A	1R	1R	1–6
French Open	A	A	2R	1R	3R	1R	A	1R	A	1R	3–6
Wimbledon	Q2	2R	1R	A	1R	A	A	NH	1R	A	1–4
US Open	2R	2R	2R (Note: Veselý together with František Čermák withdrew before second round match.)	A	1R	A	A	A	A	1R	3–4
Win–loss	1–1	2–2	2–3	1–2	2–4	0–2	0–0	0–1	0–2	0–3	8–20
National Representation
Davis Cup	A	A	1R	A	1R	Z1	Z1	RR			2–4
Career Statistics
	2013	2014	2015	2016	2017	2018	2019	2020	2021	2022	Career
Tournaments	1	5	18	7	15	7	1	2	9	7	71
Titles	0	1	0	0	1	0	0	0	0	0	2
Finals	0	1	0	0	1	1	0	0	0	0	3
Overall win–loss	1–1	7–4	7–16	4–7	9–12	6–6	0–2	0–2	3–9	2–7	39–66
Year-end rankings	305	123	181	184	135	177	584	651	342	686	37.14%

== ATP Tour finals ==
=== Singles: 4 (2 titles, 2 runner-ups) ===
Legend Grand Slam (0–0) ATP Masters 1000 (0–0) ATP 500 (0–1) ATP 250 (2–1)	Finals by surface Hard (2–1) Clay (0–1) Grass (0–0)	Finals by setting Outdoor (2–2) Indoor (0–0)

Result	W–L	Date	Tournament	Tier	Surface	Opponent	Score
Win	1–0	Jan 2015	Auckland Open, New Zealand	ATP 250	Hard	(France) Adrian Mannarino	6–3, 6–2
Loss	1–1	Apr 2015	Romanian Open, Romania	ATP 250	Clay	(Spain) Guillermo García López	6–7^{(5–7)}, 6–7^{(11–13)}
Win	2–1	Feb 2020	Maharashtra Open, India	ATP 250	Hard	(Belarus) Egor Gerasimov	7–6^{(7–2)}, 5–7, 6–3
Loss	2–2	Feb 2022	Dubai Tennis Championships, UAE	ATP 500	Hard	(Russia) Andrey Rublev	3–6, 4–6

=== Doubles: 3 (2 titles, 1 runner-up) ===
Legend Grand Slam (0–0) ATP Masters 1000 (0–0) ATP 500 (0–0) ATP 250 (2–1)	Finals by surface Hard (1–0) Clay (1–1) Grass (0–0)	Finals by setting Outdoor (1–1) Indoor (1–0)

Result	W–L	Date	Tournament	Tier	Surface	Partner	Opponents	Score
Win	1–0	Oct 2014	Kremlin Cup, Russia	ATP 250	Hard (i)	(Czech Republic) František Čermák	(Australia) Sam Groth (Australia) Chris Guccione	7–6^{(7–2)}, 7–5
Win	2–0	May 2017	Istanbul Open, Turkey	ATP 250	Clay	(Czech Republic) Roman Jebavý	(Turkey) Tuna Altuna (Italy) Alessandro Motti	6–0, 6–0
Loss	2–1	Jul 2018	Croatia Open Umag, Croatia	ATP 250	Clay	(Czech Republic) Roman Jebavý	(Netherlands) Robin Haase (Netherlands) Matwé Middelkoop	4–6, 4–6

== ATP Challenger and ITF Futures finals ==
=== Singles: 23 (18 titles, 5 runner-ups) ===
Legend ATP Challenger Tour (9–4) ITF Futures (9–1)	Finals by surface Hard (5–0) Clay (12–5) Grass (0–0) Carpet (1–0)

Result	W–L	Date	Tournament	Tier	Surface	Opponent	Score
Win	1–0	May 2011	Czech Republic F1, Teplice	Futures	Clay	(Slovakia) Norbert Gombos	3–6, 7–6^{(9–7)}, 6–1
Win	2–0	Jan 2012	China F1, Shenzhen	Futures	Hard	(United States) Austin Krajicek	6–4, 7–5
Win	3–0	Jul 2012	Czech Republic F4, Prostějov	Futures	Clay	(Austria) Dominic Thiem	6–4, 6–4
Win	4–0	Jul 2012	Czech Republic F5, Prague	Futures	Clay	(Slovakia) Norbert Gombos	6–4, 6–0
Loss	4–1	Jul 2012	Czech Republic F6, Liberec	Futures	Clay	(Czech Republic) Adam Pavlásek	6–3, 6–7^{(3–7)}, 0–6
Win	5–1	Aug 2012	Austria F5, Wels	Futures	Clay	(Austria) Marc Rath	6–2, 6–2
Win	6–1	Sep 2012	Portugal F4, Espinho	Futures	Clay	(Switzerland) Henri Laaksonen	6–2, 6–4
Win	7–1	Jan 2013	Israel F1, Eilat	Futures	Hard	(Spain) Guillermo Olaso	6–1, 6–2
Win	8–1	Jan 2013	Israel F2, Eliat	Futures	Hard	(Republic of Ireland) James McGee	6–2, 6–4
Win	9–1	Mar 2013	USA F6, Harlingen	Futures	Hard	(United States) Bjorn Fratangelo	5–7, 7–6^{(7–4)}, 6–3
Win	10–1	Apr 2013	Mersin, Turkey	Challenger	Clay	(Germany) Simon Greul	6–1, 6–1
Win	11–1	May 2013	Ostrava, Czech Republic	Challenger	Clay	(Belgium) Steve Darcis	6–4, 6–4
Loss	11–2	May 2013	Prostějov, Czech Republic	Challenger	Clay	(Czech Republic) Radek Štěpánek	4–6, 2–6
Loss	11–3	Jul 2013	Braunschweig, Germany	Challenger	Clay	(Germany) Florian Mayer	6–4, 2–6, 1–6
Win	12–3	Aug 2013	Liberec, Czech Republic	Challenger	Clay	(Argentina) Federico Delbonis	6–7^{(2–7)}, 7–6^{(9–7)}, 6–4
Win	13–3	Jun 2014	Prostějov, Czech Republic	Challenger	Clay	(Slovakia) Norbert Gombos	6–2, 6–2
Loss	13–4	Jun 2014	Prague, Czech Republic	Challenger	Clay	(Czech Republic) Lukáš Rosol	6–3, 4–6, 4–6
Win	14–4	Jun 2015	Prostějov, Czech Republic (2)	Challenger	Clay	(Serbia) Laslo Djere	6–4, 6–2
Win	15–4	Jun 2017	Prostějov, Czech Republic (3)	Challenger	Clay	(Argentina) Federico Delbonis	5–7, 6–1, 7–5
Loss	15–5	May 2018	Heilbronn, Germany	Challenger	Clay	(Germany) Rudolf Molleker	6–4, 4–6, 5–7
Win	16–5	Nov 2019	Eckental, Germany	Challenger	Carpet (i)	(Belgium) Steve Darcis	6–4, 4–6, 6–3
Win	17–5	Oct 2021	Mouilleron-le-Captif, France	Challenger	Hard (i)	(Slovakia) Norbert Gombos	6–4, 6–4
Win	18–5	May 2024	Prague, Czech Republic	Challenger	Clay	(Belgium) Gauthier Onclin	6–2, 3–6, 7–6^{(7–3)}

=== Doubles: 10 (6 titles, 4 runner-ups) ===
Legend ATP Challenger Tour (1–3) ITF Futures (5–1)	Finals by surface Hard (2–0) Clay (4–3) Grass (0–0) Carpet (0–1)

Result	W–L	Date	Tournament	Tier	Surface	Partner	Opponents	Score
Loss	0–1	Nov 2010	Czech Republic F5, Opava	Futures	Carpet (i)	(Czech Republic) Radim Urbanek	(Czech Republic) Michal Konečný (Czech Republic) Daniel Lustig	6–7^{(7–9)}, 2–6
Loss	0–2	May 2012	Ostrava, Czech Republic	Challenger	Clay	(Czech Republic) Adam Pavlásek	(Moldova) Radu Albot (Russia) Teymuraz Gabashvili	5–7, 7–5, [8–10]
Win	1–2	May 2012	Czech Republic F2, Most	Futures	Clay	(Czech Republic) Jaroslav Pospíšil	(Canada) Érik Chvojka (Czech Republic) Marek Michalička	6–1, 6–4
Win	2–2	May 2012	Czech Republic F3, Jablonec nad Nisou	Futures	Clay	(Czech Republic) Jaroslav Pospíšil	(Australia) Peter Luczak (Australia) Blake Mott	7–5, 6–4
Win	3–2	Jul 2012	Czech Republic F4, Prostějov	Futures	Clay	(Czech Republic) Adam Pavlásek	(Italy) Riccardo Bellotti (Austria) Dominic Thiem	7–6^{(7–2)}, 6–3
Win	4–2	Jan 2013	Israel F1, Eilat	Futures	Hard	(Czech Republic) Roman Jebavý	(Spain) Jaime Pulgar-García (Spain) Andoni Vivanco-Guzmán	6–3, 6–1
Win	5–2	Jan 2013	Israel F2, Eilat	Futures	Hard	(Czech Republic) Roman Jebavý	(Italy) Matteo Fago (Italy) Claudio Grassi	6–4, 7–5
Win	6–2	Jun 2014	Prague, Czech Republic	Challenger	Clay	(Czech Republic) Roman Jebavý	(Chinese Taipei) Lee Hsin-han (China) Zhang Ze	6–1, 6–3
Loss	6–3	Jun 2018	Caltanissetta, Italy	Challenger	Clay	(Slovenia) Blaž Rola	(Italy) Federico Gaio (Italy) Andrea Pellegrino	6–7^{(4–7)}, 6–7^{(5–7)}
Loss	6–4	Jun 2019	Prostějov, Czech Republic	Challenger	Clay	(Czech Republic) Jiří Lehečka	(Slovakia) Filip Polášek (Austria) Philipp Oswald	4–6, 6–7^{(4–7)}

== Best Grand Slam results details ==
	Australian Open	
2018 Australian Open
Round	Opponent	Score
1R	(Czech Republic) Václav Šafránek (Q)	6–4, 6–3, 6–3
2R	(France) Adrian Mannarino (26)	3–6, 6–7^{(4–7)}, 7–5, 3–6
2021 Australian Open
Round	Opponent	Score
1R	(Belgium) Kimmer Coppejans (Q)	6–4, 3–6, 6–7^{(3–7)}, 6–3, 6–3
2R	(Spain) Pablo Carreño Busta	3–6, 6–7^{(3–7)}, 6–2, 4–6

	French Open	
2017 French Open
Round	Opponent	Score
1R	(United States) Jack Sock (14)	7–5, 7–5, 6–3
2R	(United Kingdom) Aljaž Bedene	6–3, 6–3, 4–6, 6–3
3R	(Spain) Roberto Bautista Agut (17)	3–6, 4–6, 3–6

	Wimbledon Championships	
2016 Wimbledon
Round	Opponent	Score
1R	(Netherlands) Igor Sijsling (Q)	6–2, 6–4, 7–6^{(9–7)}
2R	(Austria) Dominic Thiem (8)	7–6^{(7–4)}, 7–6^{(7–5)}, 7–6^{(7–3)}
3R	(Portugal) João Sousa (31)	6–2, 6–2, 7–5
4R	(Czech Republic) Tomáš Berdych (10)	6–4, 3–6, 6–7^{(8–10)}, 7–6^{(9–7)}, 3–6
2018 Wimbledon
Round	Opponent	Score
1R	(Germany) Florian Mayer	7–6^{(7–3)}, 6–4, 4–6, 6–1
2R	(Argentina) Diego Schwartzman (14)	6–3, 6–4, 7–6^{(7–3)}
3R	(Italy) Fabio Fognini (19)	7–6^{(7–4)}, 3–6, 6–3, 6–2
4R	(Spain) Rafael Nadal (2)	3–6, 3–6, 4–6

	US Open	
2015 US Open
Round	Opponent	Score
1R	(Italy) Paolo Lorenzi	6–4, 6–4, 6–4
2R	(Croatia) Ivo Karlović (21)	7–6^{(7–3)}, 3–6, 3–6, 6–2, 7–6^{(7–4)}
3R	(United States) John Isner (13)	3–6, 4–6 ret.

== Wins over top 10 players ==
Season	2016	...	2019	2022	Total
Wins	2		1	1	4

#	Player	Rank	Event	Surface	Rd	Score	JVR
2016
1.	(Serbia) Novak Djokovic	No. 1	Monte-Carlo Masters, France	Clay	2R	6–4, 2–6, 6–4	No. 55
2.	(Austria) Dominic Thiem	No. 8	Wimbledon, United Kingdom	Grass	2R	7–6^{(7–4)}, 7–6^{(7–5)}, 7–6^{(7–3)}	No. 64
2019
3.	(Germany) Alexander Zverev	No. 5	Wimbledon, United Kingdom	Grass	1R	4–6, 6–3, 6–2, 7–5	No. 124
2022
4.	(Serbia) Novak Djokovic	No. 1	Dubai Championships, UAE	Hard	QF	6–4, 7–6^{(7–4)}	No. 123

== Notes ==
Awards
Preceded by (Colombia) Juan Sebastián Gómez	ITF Junior World Champion; 2011	Succeeded by (Canada) Filip Peliwo
Preceded by (Slovakia) Martin Kližan (Newcomer of the Year)	ATP Star of Tomorrow; 2013	Succeeded by (Croatia) Borna Ćorić
