= Anıl Yüksel =

Turkish tennis player

- Country (sports): Turkey
- Born: 19 May 1990 (age 36) Venlo, Netherlands
- Plays: Left-handed (two-handed backhand)
- Prize money: $84,639

Singles
- Career record: 1–1 (at ATP Tour level, Grand Slam level, and in Davis Cup)
- Career titles: 0
- Highest ranking: No. 492 (21 November 2016)

Doubles
- Career record: 2–1 (at ATP Tour level, Grand Slam level, and in Davis Cup)
- Career titles: 4 ITF
- Highest ranking: No. 465 (30 July 2018)

Team competitions
- Davis Cup: 4–3
- Sports career
Medal record
Men's Tennis
Representing Turkey
Mediterranean Games
Bronze medal – third place	2018 Tarragona	Doubles
- Last updated on: 10 May 2018.

Anıl Yüksel (born 19 May 1990) is a Dutch–born Turkish tennis player.

Yüksel has a career high ATP singles ranking of 492 achieved on 11 November 2016. He also has a career high ATP doubles ranking of 465, achieved on 30 July 2018. Yüksel has won 4 ITF doubles titles.

Yüksel has represented Turkey at Davis Cup, where he has a win–loss record of 4–3.
