= 2020 Challenger Eckental – Singles =

Singles
- 2020 Challenger Eckental

Final
- Champion: (United States) Sebastian Korda
- Runner-up: (India) Ramkumar Ramanathan
- Score: 6–4, 6–4

Events
Singles	Doubles
← 2019 ·	Challenger Eckental	· 2021 →

Jiří Veselý was the defending champion but chose not to defend his title.

Sebastian Korda won the title after defeating Ramkumar Ramanathan 6–4, 6–4 in the final.

== Seeds ==
1. (Poland) Kamil Majchrzak (quarterfinals)
2. (Australia) Alexei Popyrin (quarterfinals)
3. (Belarus) Ilya Ivashka (semifinals)
4. (Russia) Evgeny Donskoy (quarterfinals)
5. (France) Antoine Hoang (first round)
6. (Switzerland) Henri Laaksonen (withdrew)
7. (United States) Sebastian Korda (champion)
8. (Slovakia) Martin Kližan (first round)

== Draw ==
=== Key ===
- Q = Qualifier
- WC = Wild card
- LL = Lucky loser
- Alt = Alternate
- SE = Special exempt
- PR = Protected ranking
- ITF = ITF entry
- JE = Junior exempt
- w/o = Walkover
- r = Retired
- d = Defaulted
- SR = Special ranking

=== Finals ===
Semifinals
Q	(Germany) Marvin Möller	6	1	1
(India) Ramkumar Ramanathan	4	6	6
3	(Belarus) Ilya Ivashka	2	4
7	(United States) Sebastian Korda	6	6

Final
(India) Ramkumar Ramanathan	4	4
7	(United States) Sebastian Korda	6	6

=== Top half ===
First round
1	(Poland) K Majchrzak	5
(Austria) S Ofner	1^{r}
(Denmark) M Torpegaard	6	4	2
(Russia) R Safiullin	4	6	6
Q	(Germany) M Möller	6	1	6
(Ukraine) I Marchenko	3	6	1
WC	(Germany) M Rosenkranz	6	6
8	(Slovakia) M Kližan	2	2
4	(Russia) E Donskoy	6	6
(Russia) A Vatutin	1	3
WC	(Germany) MH Rehberg	7^{7}	5
Alt	(Russia) T Gabashvili	6^{3}	2^{r}
(India) R Ramanathan	6	6
Q	(Croatia) D Ajduković	4	2
(Japan) H Moriya	6	5	6
5	(France) A Hoang	4	7	2

Second round
1	(Poland) K Majchrzak	6	3	6
(Russia) R Safiullin	1	6	3
Q	(Germany) M Möller	6	6
WC	(Germany) M Rosenkranz	2	4
4	(Russia) E Donskoy	3	6	7^{7}
WC	(Germany) MH Rehberg	6	3	6^{5}
(India) R Ramanathan	7^{7}	6
(Japan) H Moriya	6^{1}	4

Quarterfinals
1	(Poland) K Majchrzak	4	2
Q	(Germany) M Möller	6	6
4	(Russia) E Donskoy	2	1
(India) R Ramanathan	6	6

Semifinals
Q	(Germany) M Möller	6	1	1
(India) R Ramanathan	4	6	6

=== Bottom half ===
First round
LL	(Germany) M Bachinger	4	7^{7}	6
Alt	(Germany) J Lenz	6	6^{4}	1
WC	(Germany) M Marterer	6	5	4
(Switzerland) M-A Hüsler	3	7	6
(Austria) J Rodionov	3	6	6
(Latvia) E Gulbis	6	3	4
PR	(Germany) D Brown	2	5
3	(Belarus) I Ivashka	6	7
7	(United States) S Korda	7^{7}	6
(Czech Republic) T Macháč	6^{0}	1
(Germany) Y Maden	2	6	3
Q	(Germany) J Härteis	6	4	6
Q	(France) G Blancaneaux	6^{5}	3
(Czech Republic) Z Kolář	7^{7}	6
(Canada) B Schnur	1	4
2	(Australia) A Popyrin	6	6

Second round
LL	(Germany) M Bachinger	3	1
(Switzerland) M-A Hüsler	6	6
(Austria) J Rodionov	0	1
3	(Belarus) I Ivashka	6	6
7	(United States) S Korda	6	1	6
Q	(Germany) J Härteis	2	6	1
(Czech Republic) Z Kolář	4	4
2	(Australia) A Popyrin	6	6

Quarterfinals
(Switzerland) M-A Hüsler	4	4
3	(Belarus) I Ivashka	6	6
7	(United States) S Korda	6	6
2	(Australia) A Popyrin	4	4

Semifinals
3	(Belarus) I Ivashka	2	4
7	(United States) S Korda	6	6
