= 2015 Bauer Watertechnology Cup – Doubles =

Doubles
- 2015 Bauer Watertechnology Cup

Final
- Champion: (Belgium) Ruben Bemelmans (Germany) Philipp Petzschner
- Runner-up: (United Kingdom) Ken Skupski (United Kingdom) Neal Skupski
- Score: 7–5, 6–2

Events
Singles	Doubles
← 2014 ·	Bauer Watertechnology Cup	· 2016 →

Ruben Bemelmans and Philipp Petzschner won the title, beating Ken Skupski and Neal Skupski 7–5, 6–2

== Seeds ==
1. (Australia) Rameez Junaid / (Slovakia) Igor Zelenay (first round)
2. (Belarus) Aliaksandr Bury / (Sweden) Andreas Siljeström (semifinals)
3. (Belarus) Sergey Betov / (Russia) Andrey Rublev (first round)
4. (Serbia) Ilija Bozoljac / (Croatia) Mate Pavić (first round)

== Draw ==
=== Key ===
- Q = Qualifier
- WC = Wild card
- LL = Lucky loser
- Alt = Alternate
- SE = Special exempt
- PR = Protected ranking
- ITF = ITF entry
- JE = Junior exempt
- w/o = Walkover
- r = Retired
- d = Defaulted
- SR = Special ranking

=== Draw ===
First round
1	(Australia) R Junaid (Slovakia) I Zelenay	2	1
(Belgium) R Bemelmans (Germany) P Petzschner	6	6
(Bosnia and Herzegovina) M Bašić (Kazakhstan) A Nedovyesov
(Uzbekistan) F Dustov (Italy) F Gaio	w/o
4	(Serbia) I Bozoljac (Croatia) M Pavić	6^{6}	7^{7}	[10]
(Poland) M Kowalczyk (Croatia) D Marcan	7^{8}	6^{4}	[12]
WC	(Belarus) U Ignatik (Russia) A Karatsev	6	3	[12]
(Netherlands) S Arends (Romania) C Pavăl	4	6	[14]
(United Kingdom) K Skupski (United Kingdom) N Skupski	7^{7}	7^{8}
WC	(Germany) K Krawietz (Germany) M Marterer	6^{1}	6^{6}
WC	(Germany) J Härteis (Germany) D Masur	7	2	[10]
3	(Belarus) S Betov (Russia) A Rublev	5	6	[7]
(Germany) F Moser (Croatia) A Šančić	7^{9}	5	[6]
(Australia) C Ball (Germany) D Brown	6^{7}	7	[10]
PR	(Switzerland) M Chiudinelli (Poland) M Fyrstenberg	4	6	[8]
2	(Belarus) A Bury (Sweden) A Siljeström	6	4	[10]

Quarterfinals
(Belgium) R Bemelmans (Germany) P Petzschner	6	6
(Uzbekistan) F Dustov (Italy) F Gaio	2	4
(Poland) M Kowalczyk (Croatia) D Marcan	6	6
(Netherlands) S Arends (Romania) C Pavăl	3	4
(United Kingdom) K Skupski (United Kingdom) N Skupski	6	5	[10]
WC	(Germany) J Härteis (Germany) D Masur	2	7	[8]
(Australia) C Ball (Germany) D Brown	7^{7}	3	[7]
2	(Belarus) A Bury (Sweden) A Siljeström	6^{5}	6	[10]

Semifinals
(Belgium) R Bemelmans (Germany) P Petzschner	6	6
(Poland) M Kowalczyk (Croatia) D Marcan	1	4
(United Kingdom) K Skupski (United Kingdom) N Skupski	6	6
2	(Belarus) A Bury (Sweden) A Siljeström	1	4

Final
(Belgium) R Bemelmans (Germany) P Petzschner	7	6
(United Kingdom) K Skupski (United Kingdom) N Skupski	5	2
