= 2020 Challenger Eckental =

- Date: 2–8 November
- Edition: 24th
- Surface: Carpet
- Location: Eckental, Germany

Champions

Singles
- (United States) Sebastian Korda

Doubles
- (Germany) Dustin Brown / (France) Antoine Hoang
← 2019 ·	Challenger Eckental	· 2021 →

The 2020 Challenger Eckental was a professional tennis tournament played on carpet courts. It was the 24th edition of the tournament which was part of the 2020 ATP Challenger Tour. It took place in Eckental, Germany between 2 and 8 November 2020.

== Singles main-draw entrants ==
=== Seeds ===
Country	Player	Rank^{1}	Seed
POL	Kamil Majchrzak	105	1
AUS	Alexei Popyrin	109	2
BLR	Ilya Ivashka	114	3
RUS	Evgeny Donskoy	119	4
FRA	Antoine Hoang	129	5
~~SUI~~	~~Henri Laaksonen~~	~~133~~	~~6~~
USA	Sebastian Korda	135	7
SVK	Martin Kližan	148	8

- ^{1} Rankings are as of 26 October 2020.

=== Other entrants ===
The following players received wildcards into the singles main draw:

- (Germany) Maximilian Marterer
- (Germany) Max Hans Rehberg
- (Germany) Mats Rosenkranz

The following player received entry into the singles main draw using a protected ranking:

- (Germany) Dustin Brown

The following players received entry into the singles main draw as alternates:

- (Russia) Teymuraz Gabashvili
- (Germany) Julian Lenz

The following players received entry from the qualifying draw:

- (Croatia) Duje Ajduković
- (France) Geoffrey Blancaneaux
- (Germany) Johannes Härteis
- (Germany) Marvin Möller

The following player received entry as a lucky loser:

- (Germany) Matthias Bachinger

== Champions ==
=== Singles ===
- (United States) Sebastian Korda def. (India) Ramkumar Ramanathan 6–4, 6–4.

=== Doubles ===
- (Germany) Dustin Brown / (France) Antoine Hoang def. (United Kingdom) Lloyd Glasspool / (United States) Alex Lawson 6–7^{(8–10)}, 7–5, [13–11].
