= 2019 Challenger Eckental =

- Date: 28 October – 3 November
- Edition: 23rd
- Surface: Carpet
- Location: Eckental, Germany

Champions

Singles
- (Czech Republic) Jiří Veselý

Doubles
- (United Kingdom) Ken Skupski / (Australia) John-Patrick Smith
← 2018 ·	Challenger Eckental	· 2020 →

The 2019 Challenger Eckental was a professional tennis tournament played on carpet courts. It was the 23rd edition of the tournament which was part of the 2019 ATP Challenger Tour. It took place in Eckental, Germany between 28 October and 3 November 2019.

== Singles main-draw entrants ==
=== Seeds ===
Country	Player	Rank^{1}	Seed
POL	Kamil Majchrzak	91	1
SUI	Henri Laaksonen	105	2
RSA	Lloyd Harris	106	3
GER	Peter Gojowczyk	112	4
GER	Yannick Maden	117	5
RUS	Evgeny Donskoy	118	6
CZE	Jiří Veselý	121	7
AUT	Dennis Novak	124	8
BLR	Ilya Ivashka	144	9
UKR	Sergiy Stakhovsky	145	10
FIN	Emil Ruusuvuori	148	11
CZE	Lukáš Rosol	153	12
ITA	Federico Gaio	156	13
SRB	Viktor Troicki	159	14
GER	Oscar Otte	162	15
AUT	Sebastian Ofner	165	16

- ^{1} Rankings are as of 21 October 2019.

=== Other entrants ===
The following players received wildcards into the singles main draw:

- (Germany) Niklas Guttau
- (Germany) Johannes Härteis
- (Germany) Jeremy Schifris
- (Germany) Tobias Simon
- (Germany) Leopold Zima

The following player received entry into the singles main draw as an alternate:

- (Switzerland) Marc-Andrea Hüsler

The following players received entry from the qualifying draw:

- (Norway) Viktor Durasovic
- (Czech Republic) Tomáš Macháč

The following player received entry as a lucky loser:

- (Germany) Max Wiskandt

== Champions ==
=== Singles ===
- (Czech Republic) Jiří Veselý def. (Belgium) Steve Darcis 6–4, 4–6, 6–3.

=== Doubles ===
- (United Kingdom) Ken Skupski / (Australia) John-Patrick Smith def. (Netherlands) Sander Arends / (Czech Republic) Roman Jebavý 7–6^{(7–2)}, 6–4.
