= 2018 Bauer Watertechnology Cup =

- Date: 29 October – 4 November
- Edition: 22nd
- Surface: Carpet
- Location: Eckental, Germany

Champions

Singles
- (France) Antoine Hoang

Doubles
- (Germany) Kevin Krawietz / (Germany) Andreas Mies
← 2017 ·	Bauer Watertechnology Cup	· 2019 →

The 2018 Bauer Watertechnology Cup was a professional tennis tournament played on carpet courts. It was the 22nd edition of the tournament which was part of the 2018 ATP Challenger Tour. It took place in Eckental, Germany between 29 October and 4 November 2018.

== Singles main-draw entrants ==
=== Seeds ===
Country	Player	Rank^{1}	Seed
SVK	Lukáš Lacko	77	1
POL	Hubert Hurkacz	91	2
ESP	Guillermo García López	96	3
RUS	Evgeny Donskoy	99	4
GER	Yannick Maden	118	5
CYP	Marcos Baghdatis	128	6
BEL	Ruben Bemelmans	134	7
AUT	Dennis Novak	137	8

- ^{1} Rankings are as of 22 October 2018.

=== Other entrants ===
The following players received wildcards into the singles main draw:

- (Germany) Kevin Krawietz
- (Germany) Daniel Masur
- (Germany) Rudolf Molleker
- (Germany) Louis Wessels

The following player received entry into the singles main draw as an alternate:

- (Russia) Alexey Vatutin

The following players received entry from the qualifying draw:

- (Italy) Roberto Marcora
- (France) Albano Olivetti
- (France) Gleb Sakharov
- (Netherlands) Igor Sijsling

The following players received entry as lucky losers:

- (France) Benjamin Bonzi
- (Kazakhstan) Alexander Bublik
- (Croatia) Borna Gojo

== Champions ==
=== Singles ===
- (France) Antoine Hoang def. (Belgium) Ruben Bemelmans 7–5, 6–3.

=== Doubles ===
- (Germany) Kevin Krawietz / (Germany) Andreas Mies def. (France) Hugo Nys / (United Kingdom) Jonny O'Mara 6–1, 6–4.
