= 2014 Bauer Watertechnology Cup =

- Date: 27 October – 2 November
- Edition: 18th
- Surface: Carpet
- Location: Eckental, Germany

Champions

Singles
- (Belgium) Ruben Bemelmans

Doubles
- (Belgium) Ruben Bemelmans / (Belgium) Niels Desein
| ← 2013 · | Bauer Watertechnology Cup | · 2015 → |

The 2014 Bauer Watertechnology Cup was a professional tennis tournament played on carpet courts. It was the 18th edition of the tournament which was part of the 2014 ATP Challenger Tour. It took place in Eckental, Germany between 27 October and 2 November 2014.

== Singles main-draw entrants ==
=== Seeds ===
| Country | Player | Rank^{1} | Seed |
|---|---|---|---|
| GER | Dustin Brown | 89 | 1 |
| GER | Andreas Beck | 110 | 2 |
| TUR | Marsel İlhan | 115 | 3 |
| RUS | Evgeny Donskoy | 127 | 4 |
| ITA | Luca Vanni | 153 | 5 |
| GER | Matthias Bachinger | 159 | 6 |
| UKR | Denys Molchanov | 176 | 7 |
| ITA | Andrea Arnaboldi | 180 | 8 |

- ^{1} Rankings are as of 20 October 2014.

=== Other entrants ===
The following players received wildcards into the singles main draw:

- (Germany) Johannes Härteis
- (Germany) Kevin Krawietz
- (Germany) Maximilian Marterer
- (Germany) Philipp Petzschner

The following player received entry by a protected ranking:

- (Ukraine) Sergei Bubka

The following players received entry from the qualifying draw:

- (Bosnia and Herzegovina) Mirza Bašić
- (Russia) Denis Matsukevich
- (Croatia) Antonio Šančić
- (Croatia) Filip Veger

== Champions ==
=== Singles ===
- (Belgium) Ruben Bemelmans def. (Germany) Tim Pütz 7–6^{(7–3)}, 6–3

=== Doubles ===
- (Belgium) Ruben Bemelmans / (Belgium) Niels Desein def. (Germany) Andreas Beck / (Germany) Philipp Petzschner 6–3, 4–6, [10–8]
