= 2015 Bauer Watertechnology Cup – Singles =

Singles
- 2015 Bauer Watertechnology Cup

Final
- Champion: (Russia) Mikhail Youzhny
- Runner-up: (Germany) Benjamin Becker
- Score: 7–5, 6–3

Events
Singles	Doubles
← 2014 ·	Bauer Watertechnology Cup	· 2016 →

Mikhail Youzhny won the title, beating Benjamin Becker 7–5, 6–3

== Seeds ==
1. (Lithuania) Ričardas Berankis (first round)
2. (Belgium) Ruben Bemelmans (semifinals)
3. (Turkey) Marsel İlhan (second round)
4. (Germany) Benjamin Becker (final)
5. (Germany) Dustin Brown (quarterfinals)
6. (Slovakia) Lukáš Lacko (second round)
7. (Italy) Luca Vanni (quarterfinals)
8. (Uzbekistan) Farrukh Dustov (first round)

== Draw ==
=== Key ===
- Q = Qualifier
- WC = Wild card
- LL = Lucky loser
- Alt = Alternate
- SE = Special exempt
- PR = Protected ranking
- ITF = ITF entry
- JE = Junior exempt
- w/o = Walkover
- r = Retired
- d = Defaulted
- SR = Special ranking

=== Finals ===
Semifinals
(Russia) Mikhail Youzhny	6	6
Q	(Croatia) Ante Pavić	4	3
4	(Germany) Benjamin Becker	6	6
2	(Belgium) Ruben Bemelmans	3	2

Final
(Russia) Mikhail Youzhny	7	6
4	(Germany) Benjamin Becker	5	3

=== Top half ===
First round
1	(Lithuania) R Berankis	6	4	3
(Italy) F Gaio	3	6	6
PR	(Switzerland) M Chiudinelli	2	4
(Russia) M Youzhny	6	6
WC	(Germany) P Petzschner	7^{7}	2	3
LL	(Czech Republic) J Hernych	6^{2}	6	6
(Czech Republic) J Mertl	5	2
7	(Italy) L Vanni	7	6
3	(Turkey) M İlhan	7^{7}	6
(Belgium) M Authom	6^{5}	4
Q	(Croatia) A Pavić	6	6
WC	(Germany) D Masur	2	0
(Belarus) U Ignatik	6^{3}	4
Q	(Hungary) M Fucsovics	7^{7}	6
(Russia) A Rublev	6^{11}	4
6	(Slovakia) L Lacko	7^{13}	6

Second round
(Italy) F Gaio	1	2
(Russia) M Youzhny	6	6
LL	(Czech Republic) J Hernych	4	5
7	(Italy) L Vanni	6	7
3	(Turkey) M İlhan	3	4
Q	(Croatia) A Pavić	6	6
Q	(Hungary) M Fucsovics	6	5	7^{7}
6	(Slovakia) L Lacko	1	7	6^{3}

Quarterfinals
(Russia) M Youzhny	3	7^{7}	7
7	(Italy) L Vanni	6	6^{3}	5
Q	(Croatia) A Pavić	5	6	6
Q	(Hungary) M Fucsovics	7	2	4

Semifinals
(Russia) M Youzhny	6	6
Q	(Croatia) A Pavić	4	3

=== Bottom half ===
First round
5	(Germany) D Brown	6	6
Q	(Germany) Y Hanfmann	2	1
(Slovenia) G Žemlja	1	7^{7}	6^{5}
Q	(Belgium) N Desein	6	6^{5}	7^{7}
(Russia) A Karatsev	6	6
WC	(Germany) O Otte	4	4
(Kazakhstan) A Nedovyesov	1	0^{r}
4	(Germany) B Becker	6	3
8	(Uzbekistan) F Dustov	1	6^{2}
(Bosnia and Herzegovina) M Bašić	6	7^{7}
(Bosnia and Herzegovina) A Šetkić	6	3	6
(Italy) A Arnaboldi	1	6	2
(Romania) M Copil	6	6
(Netherlands) I Sijsling	3	2
WC	(Germany) M Marterer	4	3
2	(Belgium) R Bemelmans	6	6

Second round
5	(Germany) D Brown	7^{7}	6
Q	(Belgium) N Desein	6^{5}	2
(Russia) A Karatsev	7^{7}	5	4
4	(Germany) B Becker	6^{3}	7	6
(Bosnia and Herzegovina) M Bašić	3	3
(Bosnia and Herzegovina) A Šetkić	6	6
(Romania) M Copil	6^{5}	3
2	(Belgium) R Bemelmans	7^{7}	6

Quarterfinals
5	(Germany) D Brown	1	2
4	(Germany) B Becker	6	6
(Bosnia and Herzegovina) A Šetkić	3	0
2	(Belgium) R Bemelmans	6	6

Semifinals
4	(Germany) B Becker	6	6
2	(Belgium) R Bemelmans	3	2
