= 2021 Challenger Eckental =

- Date: 1–7 November
- Edition: 25th
- Surface: Carpet (Indoor)
- Location: Eckental, Germany

Champions

Singles
- (Germany) Daniel Masur

Doubles
- (Czech Republic) Roman Jebavý / (United Kingdom) Jonny O'Mara
← 2020 ·	Challenger Eckental	· 2022 →

The 2021 Challenger Eckental was a professional tennis tournament played on carpet courts. It was the 25th edition of the Challenger Eckental, which was part of the 2021 ATP Challenger Tour. It took place in Eckental, Germany, between 1 and 7 November 2021.

== Singles main-draw entrants ==
=== Seeds ===
Country	Player	Rank^{1}	Seed
AUS	Jordan Thompson	71	1
CZE	Jiří Veselý	78	2
AUT	Jurij Rodionov	131	3
GER	Oscar Otte	135	4
CZE	Tomáš Macháč	136	5
USA	Maxime Cressy	141	6
~~GER~~	~~Mats Moraing~~	~~154~~	~~7~~
POL	Kacper Żuk	163	8

- ^{1} Rankings are as of 25 October 2021.

=== Other entrants ===
The following players received wildcards into the singles main draw:

- (Germany) Marvin Möller
- (Germany) Max Hans Rehberg
- (Germany) Mats Rosenkranz

The following player received entry into the singles main draw using a protected ranking:

- ~~(Germany) Julian Lenz~~

The following players received entry from the qualifying draw:

- (Germany) Johannes Härteis
- (Belgium) Christopher Heyman
- (Germany) Tobias Simon
- (Germany) Henri Squire

The following players received entry as lucky losers:

- (Austria) Alexander Erler
- (Austria) Lucas Miedler
- (Bosnia and Herzegovina) Aldin Šetkić

== Champions ==
=== Singles ===
- (Germany) Daniel Masur def. (United States) Maxime Cressy 6–4, 6–4.

=== Doubles ===
- (Czech Republic) Roman Jebavý / (United Kingdom) Jonny O'Mara def. (Belgium) Ruben Bemelmans / (Germany) Daniel Masur 6–4, 7–5.
