= 2018 Bauer Watertechnology Cup – Doubles =

Doubles
- 2018 Bauer Watertechnology Cup

Final
- Champions: (Germany) Kevin Krawietz (Germany) Andreas Mies
- Runners-up: (France) Hugo Nys (United Kingdom) Jonny O'Mara
- Score: 6–1, 6–4

Events
Singles	Doubles
← 2017 ·	Bauer Watertechnology Cup	· 2019 →

Sander Arends and Roman Jebavý were the defending champions but only Arends chose to defend his title, partnering Romain Arneodo. Arends lost in the semifinals to Hugo Nys and Jonny O'Mara.

Kevin Krawietz and Andreas Mies won the title after defeating Nys and O'Mara 6–1, 6–4 in the final.

== Seeds ==
1. (New Zealand) Marcus Daniell / (Brazil) Marcelo Demoliner (semifinals)
2. (France) Hugo Nys / (United Kingdom) Jonny O'Mara (final)
3. (Netherlands) Sander Arends / (Monaco) Romain Arneodo (semifinals)
4. (Germany) Kevin Krawietz / (Germany) Andreas Mies (champions)

== Draw ==
=== Key ===
- Q = Qualifier
- WC = Wild card
- LL = Lucky loser
- Alt = Alternate
- SE = Special exempt
- PR = Protected ranking
- ITF = ITF entry
- JE = Junior exempt
- w/o = Walkover
- r = Retired
- d = Defaulted
- SR = Special ranking

First round
1	(New Zealand) M Daniell (Brazil) M Demoliner	6^{3}	7^{7}	[10]
(Belarus) A Vasilevski (Austria) T-S Weissborn	7^{7}	6^{5}	[7]
WC	(Germany) D Masur (Germany) C Seraphim	6	7
(Belgium) S Gillé (Belgium) J Vliegen	3	5
4	(Germany) K Krawietz (Germany) A Mies	6^{4}	6	[10]
(Slovakia) A Martin (Chile) H Podlipnik Castillo	7^{7}	2	[8]
(Australia) R Junaid (Netherlands) D Pel	6^{1}	3
WC	(Germany) J Härteis (Germany) Kai Lemstra	7^{7}	6
(France) F Martin (Italy) J Ocleppo	4	6^{3}
Alt	(Germany) A Begemann (Slovakia) F Polášek	6	7^{7}
(United States) J Cerretani (Israel) J Erlich	4	6	[7]
3	(Netherlands) S Arends (Monaco) R Arneodo	6	1	[10]
(India) P Raja (Croatia) A Šančić	6^{4}	7^{8}	[10]
(Italy) S Bolelli (Ukraine) S Stakhovsky	7^{7}	6^{6}	[0]
(Belarus) A Bury (Russia) E Donskoy	6^{5}	6^{3}
2	(France) H Nys (United Kingdom) J O'Mara	7^{7}	7^{7}

Quarterfinals
1	(New Zealand) M Daniell (Brazil) M Demoliner	7^{7}	6^{4}	[10]
WC	(Germany) D Masur (Germany) C Seraphim	6^{4}	7^{7}	[7]
4	(Germany) K Krawietz (Germany) A Mies	7	6
WC	(Germany) J Härteis (Germany) K Lemstra	5	4
Alt	(Germany) A Begemann (Slovakia) F Polášek	6	3	[5]
3	(Netherlands) S Arends (Monaco) R Arneodo	4	6	[10]
(India) P Raja (Croatia) A Šančić	7^{7}	5	[7]
2	(France) H Nys (United Kingdom) J O'Mara	6^{4}	7	[10]

Semifinals
1	(New Zealand) M Daniell (Brazil) M Demoliner	6^{5}	6	[8]
4	(Germany) K Krawietz (Germany) A Mies	7^{7}	3	[10]
3	(Netherlands) S Arends (Monaco) R Arneodo	7	5	[11]
2	(France) H Nys (United Kingdom) J O'Mara	5	7	[13]

Final
4	(Germany) K Krawietz (Germany) A Mies	6	6
2	(France) H Nys (United Kingdom) J O'Mara	1	4
