= 2017 Bauer Watertechnology Cup – Doubles =

Doubles
- 2017 Bauer Watertechnology Cup

Final
- Champions: (Netherlands) Sander Arends (Czech Republic) Roman Jebavý
- Runners-up: (United Kingdom) Ken Skupski (United Kingdom) Neal Skupski
- Score: 6–2, 6–4

Events
Singles	Doubles
← 2016 ·	Bauer Watertechnology Cup	· 2018 →

Kevin Krawietz and Albano Olivetti were the defending champions but lost in the first round to Aliaksandr Bury and Andreas Siljeström.

Sander Arends and Roman Jebavý won the title after defeating Ken and Neal Skupski 6–2, 6–4 in the final.

== Seeds ==
1. (United Kingdom) Ken Skupski / (United Kingdom) Neal Skupski (final)
2. (Netherlands) Sander Arends / (Czech Republic) Roman Jebavý (champions)
3. (Croatia) Marin Draganja / (Croatia) Tomislav Draganja (quarterfinals)
4. (Sweden) Johan Brunström / (France) Hugo Nys (quarterfinals)

== Draw ==
=== Key ===
- Q = Qualifier
- WC = Wild card
- LL = Lucky loser
- Alt = Alternate
- SE = Special exempt
- PR = Protected ranking
- ITF = ITF entry
- JE = Junior exempt
- w/o = Walkover
- r = Retired
- d = Defaulted
- SR = Special ranking

First round
1	(United Kingdom) K Skupski (United Kingdom) N Skupski	6	6
WC	(Germany) Kai Lemstra (Germany) R Molleker	3	3
(Belarus) U Ignatik (Slovakia) L Lacko	6	3	[11]
(Germany) A Satschko (Austria) T-S Weissborn	3	6	[13]
4	(Sweden) J Brunström (France) H Nys	7^{7}	6
PR	(Netherlands) D Pel (Netherlands) I Sijsling	6^{5}	3
(Germany) K Krawietz (France) A Olivetti	6^{9}	6	[4]
(Belarus) A Bury (Sweden) A Siljeström	7^{11}	4	[10]
(Belgium) R Bemelmans (Ukraine) D Molchanov	4	6	[10]
(Germany) A Begemann (Germany) T Pütz	6	4	[8]
(Belgium) S Gillé (United Kingdom) J O'Mara	3	5
3	(Croatia) M Draganja (Croatia) T Draganja	6	7
(Germany) D Brown (Germany) M Marterer	6	6
WC	(Germany) B Hassan (Germany) Tim Hofmann	2	4
WC	(Germany) J Härteis (Germany) D Masur	7^{7}	4	[5]
2	(Netherlands) S Arends (Czech Republic) R Jebavý	6^{3}	6	[10]

Quarterfinals
1	(United Kingdom) K Skupski (United Kingdom) N Skupski	6	6
(Germany) A Satschko (Austria) T-S Weissborn	3	2
4	(Sweden) J Brunström (France) H Nys	3	3
(Belarus) A Bury (Sweden) A Siljeström	6	6
(Belgium) R Bemelmans (Ukraine) D Molchanov	6	6
3	(Croatia) M Draganja (Croatia) T Draganja	4	2
(Germany) D Brown (Germany) M Marterer	3	6^{4}
2	(Netherlands) S Arends (Czech Republic) R Jebavý	6	7^{7}

Semifinals
1	(United Kingdom) K Skupski (United Kingdom) N Skupski	7^{12}	6
(Belarus) A Bury (Sweden) A Siljeström	6^{10}	4
(Belgium) R Bemelmans (Ukraine) D Molchanov	5	4
2	(Netherlands) S Arends (Czech Republic) R Jebavý	7	6

Final
1	(United Kingdom) K Skupski (United Kingdom) N Skupski	2	4
2	(Netherlands) S Arends (Czech Republic) R Jebavý	6	6
