= 2020 Challenger Eckental – Doubles =

Doubles
- 2020 Challenger Eckental

Final
- Champions: (Germany) Dustin Brown (France) Antoine Hoang
- Runners-up: (United Kingdom) Lloyd Glasspool (United States) Alex Lawson
- Score: 6–7^{(8–10)}, 7–5, [13–11]

Events
Singles	Doubles
← 2019 ·	Challenger Eckental	· 2021 →

Ken Skupski and John-Patrick Smith were the defending champions but chose not to defend their title.

Dustin Brown and Antoine Hoang won the title after defeating Lloyd Glasspool and Alex Lawson 6–7^{(8–10)}, 7–5, [13–11] in the final.

== Seeds ==
1. (India) Divij Sharan / (Slovakia) Igor Zelenay (quarterfinals)
2. (Netherlands) Sander Arends / (Netherlands) David Pel (quarterfinals)
3. (India) Purav Raja / (India) Ramkumar Ramanathan (quarterfinals)
4. (United Kingdom) Lloyd Glasspool / (United States) Alex Lawson (final)

== Draw ==
=== Key ===
- Q = Qualifier
- WC = Wild card
- LL = Lucky loser
- Alt = Alternate
- SE = Special exempt
- PR = Protected ranking
- ITF = ITF entry
- JE = Junior exempt
- w/o = Walkover
- r = Retired
- d = Defaulted
- SR = Special ranking

First round
1	(India) D Sharan (Slovakia) I Zelenay	5	6	[14]
(United States) J Cerretani (Czech Republic) Z Kolář	7	3	[12]
(Croatia) I Sabanov (Croatia) M Sabanov	2	3
(Switzerland) M-A Hüsler (Poland) K Majchrzak	6	6
4	(United Kingdom) L Glasspool (United States) A Lawson	7^{7}	6
PR	(Germany) M Marterer (Austria) T-S Weissborn	6^{4}	3
(Russia) T Gabashvili (Russia) R Safiullin	4	3
(Germany) A Begemann (Germany) J Lenz	6	6
(Poland) K Drzewiecki (Poland) S Walków	6^{6}	3
(Finland) H Heliövaara (Austria) J Rodionov	7^{8}	6
(Russia) E Donskoy (Belarus) I Ivashka	7	4	[9]
3	(India) P Raja (India) R Ramanathan	5	6	[11]
PR	(Germany) D Brown (France) A Hoang	6	6
WC	(Germany) F Fallert (Germany) J Härteis	2	3
WC	(Germany) M Rosenkranz (Germany) Tom Schönenberg	3	4
2	(Netherlands) S Arends (Netherlands) D Pel	6	6

Quarterfinals
1	(India) D Sharan (Slovakia) I Zelenay	4	3
(Switzerland) M-A Hüsler (Poland) K Majchrzak	6	6
4	(United Kingdom) L Glasspool (United States) A Lawson	6	6
(Germany) A Begemann (Germany) J Lenz	3	3
(Finland) H Heliövaara (Austria) J Rodionov	6	6^{3}	[10]
3	(India) P Raja (India) R Ramanathan	3	7^{7}	[8]
PR	(Germany) D Brown (France) A Hoang	6	6
2	(Netherlands) S Arends (Netherlands) D Pel	4	2

Semifinals
(Switzerland) M-A Hüsler (Poland) K Majchrzak	6^{2}	7^{8}	[6]
4	(United Kingdom) L Glasspool (United States) A Lawson	7^{7}	6^{6}	[10]
(Finland) H Heliövaara (Austria) J Rodionov	4	6^{3}
PR	(Germany) D Brown (France) A Hoang	6	7^{7}

Final
4	(United Kingdom) L Glasspool (United States) A Lawson	7^{10}	5	[11]
PR	(Germany) D Brown (France) A Hoang	6^{8}	7	[13]
