= 2010 Bauer Watertechnology Cup =

- Date: 1–7 November
- Edition: 13th
- Location: Eckental, Germany

Champions

Singles
- (Netherlands) Igor Sijsling

Doubles
- (United States) Scott Lipsky / (United States) Rajeev Ram
← 2009 ·	Bauer Watertechnology Cup	· 2011 →

The 2010 Bauer Watertechnology Cup was a professional tennis tournament played on indoor carpet courts. It was the thirteenth edition of the tournament which was part of the 2010 ATP Challenger Tour. It took place in Eckental, Germany between 1 and 7 November 2010.

== ATP entrants ==
=== Seeds ===
Country	Player	Rank^{1}	Seed
GER	Dustin Brown	102	1
SLO	Blaž Kavčič	111	2
BEL	Steve Darcis	112	3
BUL	Grigor Dimitrov	114	4
ITA	Simone Bolelli	115	5
LTU	Ričardas Berankis	117	6
NED	Jesse Huta Galung	120	7
GER	Denis Gremelmayr	130	8

- Rankings are as of October 25, 2010.

=== Other entrants ===
The following players received wildcards into the singles main draw:

- (Germany) Matthias Bachinger
- (Georgia (country)) Lado Chikhladze
- (Germany) Jan-Lennard Struff
- (Germany) Marcel Zimmermann

The following players received entry from the qualifying draw:

- (United Kingdom) Alex Bogdanovic
- (Romania) Marius Copil
- (Uzbekistan) Farrukh Dustov
- (Germany) Bastian Knittel
- (Denmark) Frederik Nielsen (LL)

== Champions ==
=== Singles ===
(Netherlands) Igor Sijsling def. (Belgium) Ruben Bemelmans, 3–6, 6–2, 6–3

=== Doubles ===
(United States) Scott Lipsky / (United States) Rajeev Ram def. (Thailand) Sanchai Ratiwatana / (Thailand) Sonchat Ratiwatana, 6–7(2), 6–4, [10–4]
