= 2010 Bauer Watertechnology Cup – Doubles =

Doubles
- 2010 Bauer Watertechnology Cup

Final
- Champions: (United States) Scott Lipsky (United States) Rajeev Ram
- Runners-up: (Thailand) Sanchai Ratiwatana (Thailand) Sonchat Ratiwatana
- Score: 6–7(2), 6–4, [10–4]

Events
Singles	Doubles
← 2009 ·	Bauer Watertechnology Cup	· 2011 →

Michael Kohlmann and Alexander Peya were the defending champions but decided not to participate.
Scott Lipsky and Rajeev Ram won the title, defeating Sanchai Ratiwatana and Sonchat Ratiwatana 6–7(2), 6–4, [10–4] in the finals.

== Seeds ==
1. (United States) Scott Lipsky / (United States) Rajeev Ram (champions)
2. (Australia) Jordan Kerr / (United Kingdom) Ken Skupski (first round)
3. (Thailand) Sanchai Ratiwatana / (Thailand) Sonchat Ratiwatana (final)
4. (Sweden) Johan Brunström / (United Kingdom) Dominic Inglot (quarterfinals)

== Draw ==
=== Key ===
- Q = Qualifier
- WC = Wild card
- LL = Lucky loser
- Alt = Alternate
- SE = Special exempt
- PR = Protected ranking
- ITF = ITF entry
- JE = Junior exempt
- w/o = Walkover
- r = Retired
- d = Defaulted
- SR = Special ranking

=== Draw ===
First round
1	(United States) S Lipsky (United States) R Ram	6	6
(Poland) T Bednarek (Austria) M Slanar	4	3
(Germany) D Brown (Luxembourg) G Müller	4	4
(Germany) D Gremelmayr (Germany) P Marx	6	6
4	(Sweden) J Brunström (United Kingdom) D Inglot	6	6
(Lithuania) R Berankis (Slovenia) B Kavčič	3	4
(United States) B Battistone (Sweden) A Siljeström	3	6	[15]
WC	(Germany) D Kindlmann (Germany) A Tattermusch	6	4	[13]
ALT	(Australia) S Kadir (India) P Raja	3	6	[7]
WC	(Germany) M Bachinger (Germany) M Zimmermann	6	3	[10]
(Canada) V Pospisil (Canada) A Shamasdin	5	6	[9]
3	(Thailand) Sa Ratiwatana (Thailand) So Ratiwatana	7	4	[11]
(United States) J Cerretani (Netherlands) J Huta Galung	6	6^{6}	[10]
(South Africa) J Coetzee (Poland) M Kowalczyk	2	7	[7]
(United Kingdom) J Delgado (United Kingdom) J Marray	6	6
2	(Australia) J Kerr (United Kingdom) K Skupski	3	4

Quarterfinals
1	(United States) S Lipsky (United States) R Ram	7	6
(Germany) D Gremelmayr (Germany) P Marx	6^{0}	2
4	(Sweden) J Brunström (United Kingdom) D Inglot	4	6^{14}
(United States) B Battistone (Sweden) A Siljeström	6	7
WC	(Germany) M Bachinger (Germany) M Zimmermann	6^{4}	6^{5}
3	(Thailand) Sa Ratiwatana (Thailand) So Ratiwatana	7	7
(United States) J Cerretani (Netherlands) J Huta Galung	3	2
(United Kingdom) J Delgado (United Kingdom) J Marray	6	6

Semifinals
1	(United States) S Lipsky (United States) R Ram	6^{6}	7	[10]
(United States) B Battistone (Sweden) A Siljeström	7	6^{14}	[7]
3	(Thailand) Sa Ratiwatana (Thailand) So Ratiwatana	6^{7}	7	[10]
(United Kingdom) J Delgado (United Kingdom) J Marray	7	5	[8]

Final
1	(United States) S Lipsky (United States) R Ram	6^{2}	6	[10]
3	(Thailand) Sa Ratiwatana (Thailand) So Ratiwatana	7	4	[4]
