= 2018 Bauer Watertechnology Cup – Singles =

Singles
- 2018 Bauer Watertechnology Cup

Final
- Champion: (France) Antoine Hoang
- Runner-up: (Belgium) Ruben Bemelmans
- Score: 7–5, 6–3

Events
Singles	Doubles
← 2017 ·	Bauer Watertechnology Cup	· 2019 →

Maximilian Marterer was the defending champion but chose not to defend his title.

Antoine Hoang won the title after defeating Ruben Bemelmans 7–5, 6–3 in the final.

== Seeds ==
1. (Slovakia) Lukáš Lacko (first round)
2. (Poland) Hubert Hurkacz (second round, retired)
3. (Spain) Guillermo García López (second round)
4. (Russia) Evgeny Donskoy (semifinals)
5. (Germany) Yannick Maden (first round)
6. (Cyprus) Marcos Baghdatis (first round)
7. (Belgium) Ruben Bemelmans (final)
8. (Austria) Dennis Novak (second round)

== Draw ==
=== Key ===
- Q = Qualifier
- WC = Wild card
- LL = Lucky loser
- Alt = Alternate
- SE = Special exempt
- PR = Protected ranking
- ITF = ITF entry
- JE = Junior exempt
- w/o = Walkover
- r = Retired
- d = Defaulted
- SR = Special ranking

=== Finals ===
Semifinals
7	(Belgium) Ruben Bemelmans	6	6
4	(Russia) Evgeny Donskoy	2	3
Q	(France) Gleb Sakharov	4	2
(France) Antoine Hoang	6	6

Final
7	(Belgium) Ruben Bemelmans	5	3
(France) Antoine Hoang	7	6

=== Top half ===
First round
1	(Slovakia) L Lacko	6^{1}	3
(Italy) S Bolelli	7^{7}	6
WC	(Germany) D Masur	6	6
LL	(Croatia) B Gojo	3	0
WC	(Germany) L Wessels	3	1
(Germany) O Otte	6	6
(Germany) D Brands	6	4	3
7	(Belgium) R Bemelmans	4	6	6
4	(Russia) E Donskoy	6	6
Q	(Netherlands) I Sijsling	1	1
(France) K de Schepper	6^{3}	4
LL	(France) B Bonzi	7^{7}	6
LL	(Kazakhstan) A Bublik	1	6	6
(Slovakia) A Martin	6	2	2
Q	(France) A Olivetti	7^{7}	3	6
6	(Cyprus) M Baghdatis	6^{5}	6	3

Second round
(Italy) S Bolelli	4	7	3
WC	(Germany) D Masur	6	5	6
(Germany) O Otte	4	1
7	(Belgium) R Bemelmans	6	6
4	(Russia) E Donskoy	5	7	6
LL	(France) B Bonzi	7	5	4
LL	(Kazakhstan) A Bublik	2	6^{3}
Q	(France) A Olivetti	6	7^{7}

Quarterfinals
WC	(Germany) D Masur	6	2	3
7	(Belgium) R Bemelmans	1	6	6
4	(Russia) E Donskoy	6	7^{7}
Q	(France) A Olivetti	4	6^{2}

Semifinals
7	(Belgium) R Bemelmans	6	6
4	(Russia) E Donskoy	2	3

=== Bottom half ===
First round
8	(Austria) D Novak	7	6
(Germany) M Moraing	5	4
WC	(Germany) K Krawietz	7^{11}	4	6^{3}
(Germany) M Bachinger	6^{9}	6	7^{7}
Alt	(Russia) A Vatutin	1	4
Q	(France) G Sakharov	6	6
(France) Q Halys	6^{7}	6^{5}
3	(Spain) G García López	7^{9}	7^{7}
5	(Germany) Y Maden	3	6^{3}
(France) A Hoang	6	7^{7}
Q	(Italy) R Marcora	4	4
(Ukraine) S Stakhovsky	6	6
(Czech Republic) L Rosol	3	6	6
WC	(Germany) R Molleker	6	3	2
(Italy) M Donati	3	6	3
2	(Poland) H Hurkacz	6	3	6

Second round
8	(Austria) D Novak	2	7^{10}	4
(Germany) M Bachinger	6	6^{8}	6
Q	(France) G Sakharov	6	7^{7}
3	(Spain) G García López	4	6^{0}
(France) A Hoang	6	6
(Ukraine) S Stakhovsky	2	2
(Czech Republic) L Rosol	5
2	(Poland) H Hurkacz	2^{r}

Quarterfinals
(Germany) M Bachinger	6	5	1
Q	(France) G Sakharov	3	7	6
(France) A Hoang	6	1	6
(Czech Republic) L Rosol	3	6	4

Semifinals
Q	(France) G Sakharov	4	2
(France) A Hoang	6	6
