= 2009 Bauer Watertechnology Cup – Doubles =

Doubles
- 2009 Bauer Watertechnology Cup

Final
- Champions: (Germany) Michael Kohlmann (Austria) Alexander Peya
- Runners-up: (Germany) Philipp Marx (Slovakia) Igor Zelenay
- Score: 6–4, 7–6(4)

Events
Singles	Doubles
← 2008 ·	Bauer Watertechnology Cup	· 2010 →

Yves Allegro and Horia Tecău, who were the winners in 2008, chose to not compete this year.
Michael Kohlmann and Alexander Peya became the new champions, by defeating Philipp Marx and Igor Zelenay 6–4, 7–6(4) in the final.

== Seeds ==
1. (Germany) Michael Kohlmann / (Austria) Alexander Peya (champions)
2. (Germany) Philipp Marx / (Slovakia) Igor Zelenay (final)
3. (India) Rohan Bopanna / (Australia) Rameez Junaid (first round)
4. (United Kingdom) Jamie Delgado / (United Kingdom) Joshua Goodall (first round)

== Draw ==
=== Key ===
- Q = Qualifier
- WC = Wild card
- LL = Lucky loser
- Alt = Alternate
- SE = Special exempt
- PR = Protected ranking
- ITF = ITF entry
- JE = Junior exempt
- w/o = Walkover
- r = Retired
- d = Defaulted
- SR = Special ranking

=== Draw ===
First round
1	(Germany) M Kohlmann (Austria) A Peya	6	4	[10]
WC	(Germany) K Krawietz (Germany) T Tattermusch	1	6	[2]
(Italy) T Fabbiano (Australia) J Sirianni	1	7	[6]
(Netherlands) A van der Duim (Netherlands) B Westerhof	6	6^{7}	[10]
4	(United Kingdom) J Delgado (United Kingdom) J Goodall	6^{5}	3
(Croatia) N Mektić (Croatia) A Veić	7	6
(Jamaica) D Brown (Czech Republic) J Krkoška	6	5	[10]
WC	(Germany) M Krickovic (Germany) C-M Stebe	1	7	[8]
(Slovakia) D Hrbatý (Czech Republic) L Rosol	w/o
(Germany) D Kindlmann (Germany) M Zimmermann
(Austria) M Fischer (Austria) P Oswald	7	3	[13]
3	(India) R Bopanna (Australia) R Junaid	5	6	[11]
(Slovenia) B Kavčič (Germany) B Knittel	6	6
WC	(Germany) M Hofmann (Germany) T Jäger	1	1
(France) O Charroin (Italy) A Motti	4	5
2	(Germany) P Marx (Slovakia) I Zelenay	6	7

Quarterfinals
1	(Germany) M Kohlmann (Austria) A Peya	6	6
(Netherlands) A van der Duim (Netherlands) B Westerhof	2	1
(Croatia) N Mektić (Croatia) A Veić	6^{5}	5
(Jamaica) D Brown (Czech Republic) J Krkoška	7	7
(Germany) D Kindlmann (Germany) M Zimmermann	6^{9}	4
(Austria) M Fischer (Austria) P Oswald	7	6
(Slovenia) B Kavčič (Germany) B Knittel	1	6	[7]
2	(Germany) P Marx (Slovakia) I Zelenay	6	3	[10]

Semifinals
1	(Germany) M Kohlmann (Austria) A Peya	6	7
(Jamaica) D Brown (Czech Republic) J Krkoška	3	6^{1}
(Austria) M Fischer (Austria) P Oswald	4	5
2	(Germany) P Marx (Slovakia) I Zelenay	6	7

Finals
1	(Germany) M Kohlmann (Austria) A Peya	6	7
2	(Germany) P Marx (Slovakia) I Zelenay	4	6^{4}
