= 2017 Bauer Watertechnology Cup – Singles =

Singles
- 2017 Bauer Watertechnology Cup

Final
- Champion: (Germany) Maximilian Marterer
- Runner-up: (Poland) Jerzy Janowicz
- Score: 7–6^{(10–8)}, 3–6, 6–3

Events
Singles	Doubles
← 2016 ·	Bauer Watertechnology Cup	· 2018 →

Steve Darcis was the defending champion but chose not to defend his title.

Maximilian Marterer won the title after defeating Jerzy Janowicz 7–6^{(10–8)}, 3–6, 6–3 in the final.

== Seeds ==
1. (Belgium) Ruben Bemelmans (quarterfinals)
2. (Germany) Maximilian Marterer (champion)
3. (Kazakhstan) Alexander Bublik (second round)
4. (Germany) Yannick Hanfmann (first round)
5. (Germany) Dustin Brown (second round)
6. (Slovakia) Lukáš Lacko (first round)
7. (Poland) Jerzy Janowicz (final)
8. (Austria) Sebastian Ofner (semifinals)

== Draw ==
=== Key ===
- Q = Qualifier
- WC = Wild card
- LL = Lucky loser
- Alt = Alternate
- SE = Special exempt
- PR = Protected ranking
- ITF = ITF entry
- JE = Junior exempt
- w/o = Walkover
- r = Retired
- d = Defaulted
- SR = Special ranking

=== Finals ===
Semifinals
7	(Poland) Jerzy Janowicz	6^{10}	6	6
(Germany) Matthias Bachinger	7^{12}	4	3
8	(Austria) Sebastian Ofner	4	4
2	(Germany) Maximilian Marterer	6	6

Final
7	(Poland) Jerzy Janowicz	6^{8}	6	3
2	(Germany) Maximilian Marterer	7^{10}	3	6

=== Top half ===
First round
1	(Belgium) R Bemelmans	6	6
(South Africa) L Harris	3	2
(Italy) L Vanni	6^{2}	6	6
(Belarus) U Ignatik	7^{7}	4	2
Q	(France) E Furness	3	2
PR	(Netherlands) I Sijsling	6	6
(Canada) F Auger-Aliassime	6^{3}	1
7	(Poland) J Janowicz	7^{7}	6
4	(Germany) Y Hanfmann	4	2
(Australia) A de Minaur	6	6
(Spain) T Robredo	6	6
WC	(Germany) R Molleker	4	2
WC	(Germany) D Altmaier	4	0
(Germany) M Bachinger	6	6
Q	(France) K de Schepper	2	5
5	(Germany) D Brown	6	7

Second round
1	(Belgium) R Bemelmans	6	6^{5}	6
(Italy) L Vanni	3	7^{7}	1
PR	(Netherlands) I Sijsling	6^{3}	3
7	(Poland) J Janowicz	7^{7}	6
(Australia) A de Minaur	7	6
(Spain) T Robredo	5	3
(Germany) M Bachinger	6	6
5	(Germany) D Brown	0	4

Quarterfinals
1	(Belgium) R Bemelmans	4	4
7	(Poland) J Janowicz	6	6
(Australia) A de Minaur	4	1
(Germany) M Bachinger	6	6

Semifinals
7	(Poland) J Janowicz	6^{10}	6	6
(Germany) M Bachinger	7^{12}	4	3

=== Bottom half ===
First round
8	(Austria) S Ofner	6	7
(Italy) S Caruso	3	5
(Bosnia and Herzegovina) A Šetkić	1	6	6
WC	(Germany) D Masur	6	3	2
(Egypt) K-M Maamoun	4	5
(Bosnia and Herzegovina) M Bašić	6	7
WC	(Germany) Jeremy Jahn	4	4
3	(Kazakhstan) A Bublik	6	6
6	(Slovakia) L Lacko	2	6	1
SE	(France) C Moutet	6	1	6
(Russia) K Kravchuk	4	3
LL	(Switzerland) Y Marti	6	6
Q	(Germany) R Kern	6^{5}	2
(Italy) S Bolelli	7^{7}	6
Q	(France) M Bourgue	7^{13}	6^{2}	3
2	(Germany) M Marterer	6^{11}	7^{7}	6

Second round
8	(Austria) S Ofner	7^{7}	6
(Bosnia and Herzegovina) A Šetkić	6^{5}	3
(Bosnia and Herzegovina) M Bašić	7	7^{7}
3	(Kazakhstan) A Bublik	5	6^{5}
SE	(France) C Moutet	6	3
LL	(Switzerland) Y Marti	2	0^{r}
(Italy) S Bolelli	7^{7}	6^{2}	3
2	(Germany) M Marterer	6^{3}	7^{7}	6

Quarterfinals
8	(Austria) S Ofner	6	6
(Bosnia and Herzegovina) M Bašić	3	4
SE	(France) C Moutet	0	1
2	(Germany) M Marterer	6	6

Semifinals
8	(Austria) S Ofner	4	4
2	(Germany) M Marterer	6	6
