= 2017 Bauer Watertechnology Cup =

- Date: 30 October – 5 November
- Edition: 21st
- Surface: Carpet
- Location: Eckental, Germany

Champions

Singles
- (Germany) Maximilian Marterer

Doubles
- (Netherlands) Sander Arends / (Czech Republic) Roman Jebavý
← 2016 ·	Bauer Watertechnology Cup	· 2018 →

The 2017 Bauer Watertechnology Cup was a professional tennis tournament played on carpet courts. It was the 21st edition of the tournament which was part of the 2017 ATP Challenger Tour. It took place in Eckental, Germany between 30 October and 5 November 2017.

== Singles main-draw entrants ==
=== Seeds ===
Country	Player	Rank^{1}	Seed
BEL	Ruben Bemelmans	84	1
GER	Maximilian Marterer	102	2
KAZ	Alexander Bublik	111	3
GER	Yannick Hanfmann	114	4
GER	Dustin Brown	119	5
SVK	Lukáš Lacko	124	6
POL	Jerzy Janowicz	136	7
AUT	Sebastian Ofner	137	8

- ^{1} Rankings are as of 23 October 2017.

=== Other entrants ===
The following players received wildcards into the singles main draw:

- (Germany) Daniel Altmaier
- (Germany) Jeremy Jahn
- (Germany) Daniel Masur
- (Germany) Rudolf Molleker

The following player received entry into the singles main draw using a protected ranking:

- (Netherlands) Igor Sijsling

The following player received entry into the singles main draw as a special exempt:

- (France) Corentin Moutet

The following players received entry from the qualifying draw:

- (France) Mathias Bourgue
- (France) Kenny de Schepper
- (France) Evan Furness
- (Germany) Robin Kern

The following player received entry as a lucky loser:

- (Switzerland) Yann Marti

== Champions ==
=== Singles ===
- (Germany) Maximilian Marterer def. (Poland) Jerzy Janowicz 7–6^{(10–8)}, 3–6, 6–3.

=== Doubles ===
- (Netherlands) Sander Arends / (Czech Republic) Roman Jebavý def. (United Kingdom) Ken Skupski / (United Kingdom) Neal Skupski 6–2, 6–4.
