= 2012 Bauer Watertechnology Cup – Singles =

Singles
- 2012 Bauer Watertechnology Cup

Final
- Champion: (Germany) Daniel Brands
- Runner-up: (Latvia) Ernests Gulbis
- Score: 7–6^{(7–0)}, 6–3

Events
Singles	Doubles
← 2011 ·	Bauer Watertechnology Cup	· 2013 →

Rajeev Ram is the defending champion, but lost in the quarterfinals to Jan Mertl.
Daniel Brands won the title, defeating Ernests Gulbis 7–6^{(7–0)}, 6–3 in the final.

== Seeds ==
1. (Slovenia) Grega Žemlja (quarterfinals)
2. (United States) Rajeev Ram (quarterfinals)
3. (Germany) Philipp Petzschner (withdrew)
4. (Germany) Daniel Brands (champion)
5. (Croatia) Ivan Dodig (withdrew)
6. (Belgium) Ruben Bemelmans (quarterfinals)
7. (Canada) Frank Dancevic (first round, retired because of a left ankle injury)
8. (Germany) Dustin Brown (first round)

== Draw ==
=== Key ===
- Q = Qualifier
- WC = Wild card
- LL = Lucky loser
- Alt = Alternate
- SE = Special exempt
- PR = Protected ranking
- ITF = ITF entry
- JE = Junior exempt
- w/o = Walkover
- r = Retired
- d = Defaulted
- SR = Special ranking

=== Finals ===
Semifinals
LL	(Latvia) Ernests Gulbis	6	6
(Germany) Dominik Meffert	3	2
4	(Germany) Daniel Brands	3	7^{13}	6
(Czech Republic) Jan Mertl	6	6^{11}	2

Final
LL	(Latvia) Ernests Gulbis	6^{0}	3
4	(Germany) Daniel Brands	7^{7}	6

=== Top half ===
First round
1	(Slovenia) G Žemlja	2	7^{7}	7
WC	(Sweden) E Ymer	6	6^{3}	5
(Italy) G Naso	1	3
(Belarus) U Ignatik	6	6
Q	(Russia) K Kravchuk	6	6
(Kazakhstan) E Korolev	4	2
LL	(Latvia) E Gulbis	6	6
Q	(Russia) A Vatutin	1	4
LL	(Austria) P Oswald	7^{12}	6
(Czech Republic) I Minář	6^{10}	2
Q	(Germany) Stefan Seifert	3	0
WC	(Germany) N Langer	6	6
WC	(Germany) K Krawietz	3	1
(Germany) D Meffert	6	6
(Germany) P Gojowczyk	6	4	6
8	(Germany) D Brown	1	6	1

Second round
1	(Slovenia) G Žemlja	6^{4}	7^{9}	7
(Belarus) U Ignatik	7^{7}	6^{7}	5
Q	(Russia) K Kravchuk	6^{2}	1
LL	(Latvia) E Gulbis	7^{7}	6
LL	(Austria) P Oswald	3	6	3
WC	(Germany) N Langer	6	4	6
(Germany) D Meffert	3	7	7^{7}
(Germany) P Gojowczyk	6	5	6^{3}

Quarterfinals
1	(Slovenia) G Žemlja	6	4	3
LL	(Latvia) E Gulbis	4	6	6
WC	(Germany) N Langer	6	1	4
(Germany) D Meffert	3	6	6

Semifinals
LL	(Latvia) E Gulbis	6	6
(Germany) D Meffert	3	2

=== Bottom half ===
First round
6	(Belgium) R Bemelmans	6	7^{7}
(Ukraine) O Nedovyesov	2	6^{4}
(Germany) J-L Struff	6	3	2
Q	(Latvia) A Juška	3	6	6
(Slovakia) A Martin	6	6^{8}	0
(Czech Republic) J Hernych	4	7^{10}	6
(Germany) P Torebko	3	5
4	(Germany) D Brands	6	7
7	(Canada) F Dancevic	0^{r}
(Italy) M Viola	5
(Czech Republic) J Mertl	6	7^{7}
(Canada) É Chvojka	4	6^{3}
PR	(Serbia) F Krajinović	6	6
(Moldova) R Albot	4	1
(France) A Olivetti	3	6^{5}
2	(United States) R Ram	6	7^{7}

Second round
6	(Belgium) R Bemelmans	6	7^{7}
Q	(Latvia) A Juška	4	6^{5}
(Czech Republic) J Hernych	7^{7}	4	r
4	(Germany) D Brands	6^{3}	6
(Italy) M Viola	4	3
(Czech Republic) J Mertl	6	6
PR	(Serbia) F Krajinović	4	4
2	(United States) R Ram	6	6

Quarterfinals
6	(Belgium) R Bemelmans	7^{10}	6^{2}	6^{4}
4	(Germany) D Brands	6^{8}	7^{7}	7^{7}
(Czech Republic) J Mertl	7^{7}	6
2	(United States) R Ram	6^{3}	3

Semifinals
4	(Germany) D Brands	3	7^{13}	6
(Czech Republic) J Mertl	6	6^{11}	2
