= 2009 Bauer Watertechnology Cup =

- Date: 2–8 November
- Edition: 13th
- Location: Eckental, Germany

Champions

Singles
- (Germany) Daniel Brands

Doubles
- (Germany) Michael Kohlmann / (Austria) Alexander Peya
← 2008 ·	Bauer Watertechnology Cup	· 2010 →

The 2009 Bauer Watertechnology Cup was a professional tennis tournament played on indoor carpet courts. It was the thirteenth edition of the tournament which was part of the 2009 ATP Challenger Tour. It took place in Eckental, Germany between 2 and 8 November 2009.

== ATP entrants ==
=== Seeds ===
Country	Player	Rank^{1}	Seed
AUT	Stefan Koubek	114	1
GER	Daniel Brands	125	2
SLO	Blaž Kavčič	128	3
FRA	Sébastien de Chaunac	140	4
CZE	Lukáš Rosol	159	5
SVK	Dominik Hrbatý	166	6
GER	Dominik Meffert	173	7
GER	Denis Gremelmayr	180	8

- Rankings are as of October 26, 2009.

=== Other entrants ===
The following players received wildcards into the singles main draw:

- (Germany) Peter Gojowczyk
- (Germany) Kevin Krawietz
- (Germany) Cedrik-Marcel Stebe
- (Germany) Marcel Zimmermann

The following players received entry from the qualifying draw:

- (Germany) Bastian Knittel
- (Germany) Nils Langer
- (Croatia) Nikola Mektić
- (Finland) Timo Nieminen (LL)
- (Netherlands) Antal van der Duim

== Champions ==
=== Singles ===
(Germany) Daniel Brands def. (Jamaica) Dustin Brown, 6–4, 6–4

=== Doubles ===
(Germany) Michael Kohlmann / (Austria) Alexander Peya def. (Germany) Philipp Marx / (Slovakia) Igor Zelenay, 6–4, 7–6(4)
