= 2016 Bauer Watertechnology Cup – Doubles =

Doubles
- 2016 Bauer Watertechnology Cup

Final
- Champions: (Germany) Kevin Krawietz (France) Albano Olivetti
- Runners-up: (Czech Republic) Roman Jebavý (Slovakia) Andrej Martin
- Score: 6–7^{(8–10)}, 6–4, [10–7]

Events
Singles	Doubles
← 2015 ·	Bauer Watertechnology Cup	· 2017 →

Ruben Bemelmans and Philipp Petzschner were the defending champions but chose not to defend their title.

Kevin Krawietz and Albano Olivetti won the title after defeating Roman Jebavý and Andrej Martin 6–7^{(8–10)}, 6–4, [10–7] in the final.

== Seeds ==
1. (Netherlands) Wesley Koolhof / (Netherlands) Matwé Middelkoop (quarterfinals)
2. (India) Purav Raja / (India) Divij Sharan (quarterfinals)
3. (Sweden) Johan Brunström / (Sweden) Andreas Siljeström (first round)
4. (United Kingdom) Ken Skupski / (United Kingdom) Neal Skupski (semifinals)

== Draw ==
Key

- Q = Qualifier
- WC = Wild card
- LL = Lucky loser
- Alt = Alternate
- ITF = ITF entry
- PR = Protected ranking
- SR = Special ranking
- SE = Special exempt
- JE = Junior exempt
- JR = Junior Accelerator Programme entrant
- CO = College Accelerator Programme entrant
- NG = Next Gen Accelerator Program entrant
- w/o = Walkover
- r = Retired
- d = Defaulted

First round
1	(Netherlands) W Koolhof (Netherlands) M Middelkoop	w/o
(Serbia) L Đere (Bosnia and Herzegovina) A Šetkić
(Germany) A Begemann (Belarus) A Bury	5	1^{r}
WC	(Germany) O Otte (Netherlands) D Pel	7	3
3	(Sweden) J Brunström (Sweden) A Siljeström	6^{4}	5
(Austria) J Melzer (Austria) T-S Weissborn	7^{7}	7
(Czech Republic) R Jebavý (Slovakia) A Martin	6	6
Alt	(Egypt) M Safwat (Chinese Taipei) T-h Yang	4	2
(Croatia) F Škugor (Belarus) A Vasilevski	6	3	[10]
WC	(Germany) M Bachinger (Germany) T Pütz	3	6	[7]
(Poland) T Bednarek (Australia) R Junaid	5	3
4	(United Kingdom) K Skupski (United Kingdom) N Skupski	7	6
(Bosnia and Herzegovina) M Bašić (Serbia) M Tepavac	6^{1}	1
(Germany) K Krawietz (France) A Olivetti	7^{7}	6
WC	(Germany) M Marterer (Germany) A Mies	6	3	[9]
2	(India) P Raja (India) D Sharan	3	6	[11]

Quarterfinals
1	(Netherlands) W Koolhof (Netherlands) M Middelkoop	3	4
WC	(Germany) O Otte (Netherlands) D Pel	6	6
(Austria) J Melzer (Austria) T-S Weissborn	6	4	[9]
(Czech Republic) R Jebavý (Slovakia) A Martin	1	6	[11]
(Croatia) F Škugor (Belarus) A Vasilevski	2	6	[11]
4	(United Kingdom) K Skupski (United Kingdom) N Skupski	6	4	[13]
(Germany) K Krawietz (France) A Olivetti	6	6
2	(India) P Raja (India) D Sharan	4	2

Semifinals
WC	(Germany) O Otte (Netherlands) D Pel	6	5	[9]
(Czech Republic) R Jebavý (Slovakia) A Martin	3	7	[11]
4	(United Kingdom) K Skupski (United Kingdom) N Skupski	6	3	[11]
(Germany) K Krawietz (France) A Olivetti	2	6	[13]

Final
(Czech Republic) R Jebavý (Slovakia) A Martin	7^{10}	4	[7]
(Germany) K Krawietz (France) A Olivetti	6^{8}	6	[10]
