= 2012 Bauer Watertechnology Cup =

Tennis tournament

- Date: 29 October – 4 November
- Edition: 16th
- Surface: Carpet
- Location: Eckental, Germany

Champions

Singles
- (Germany) Daniel Brands

Doubles
- (United States) James Cerretani / (Canada) Adil Shamasdin
← 2011 ·	Bauer Watertechnology Cup	· 2013 →

The 2012 Bauer Watertechnology Cup was a professional tennis tournament played on carpet courts. It was the 16th edition of the tournament which was part of the 2012 ATP Challenger Tour. It took place in Eckental, Germany between October 29 and November 4, 2012.

== Singles main-draw entrants ==
=== Seeds ===
Country	Player	Rank^{1}	Seed
SVN	Grega Žemlja	50	1
USA	Rajeev Ram	93	2
GER	Philipp Petzschner	97	3
GER	Daniel Brands	100	4
CRO	Ivan Dodig	110	5
BEL	Ruben Bemelmans	111	6
CAN	Frank Dancevic	136	7
GER	Dustin Brown	144	8

- ^{1} Rankings are as of October 22, 2012.

=== Other entrants ===
The following players received wildcards into the singles main draw:

- (Germany) Kevin Krawietz
- (Germany) Nils Langer
- (Germany) Philipp Petzschner
- (Sweden) Elias Ymer

The following players received entry from the qualifying draw:

- (Latvia) Ernests Gulbis (Lucky loser)
- (Latvia) Andis Juška
- (Russia) Konstantin Kravchuk
- (Austria) Philipp Oswald (Lucky loser)
- (Germany) Stefan Seifert
- (Russia) Alexey Vatutin

== Champions ==
=== Singles ===
- (Germany) Daniel Brands def. (Latvia) Ernests Gulbis, 7–6^{(7–0)}, 6–3

=== Doubles ===
- (United States) James Cerretani / (Canada) Adil Shamasdin def. (Poland) Tomasz Bednarek / (Sweden) Andreas Siljeström, 6–3, 2–6, [10–4]
