= 2009 Bauer Watertechnology Cup – Singles =

Singles
- 2009 Bauer Watertechnology Cup

Final
- Champion: (Germany) Daniel Brands
- Runner-up: (Jamaica) Dustin Brown
- Score: 6–4, 6–4

Events
Singles	Doubles
← 2008 ·	Bauer Watertechnology Cup	· 2010 →

Denis Gremelmayr, who was the defending champion, lost to Alexander Peya already in the first round.
Daniel Brands won in the final match 6–4, 6–4, against Dustin Brown.

== Seeds ==
1. (Austria) Stefan Koubek (first round)
2. (Germany) Daniel Brands (champion)
3. (Slovenia) Blaž Kavčič (second round)
4. (France) Sébastien de Chaunac (semifinals)
5. (Czech Republic) Lukáš Rosol (quarterfinals)
6. (Slovakia) Dominik Hrbatý (first round)
7. (Germany) Dominik Meffert (first round)
8. (Germany) Denis Gremelmayr (first round)

== Draw ==
=== Key ===
- Q = Qualifier
- WC = Wild card
- LL = Lucky loser
- Alt = Alternate
- SE = Special exempt
- PR = Protected ranking
- ITF = ITF entry
- JE = Junior exempt
- w/o = Walkover
- r = Retired
- d = Defaulted
- SR = Special ranking

=== Finals ===
Semifinals
(Jamaica) Dustin Brown	3	7	7
(Germany) Dieter Kindlmann	6	6^{4}	6^{5}
4	(France) Sébastien de Chaunac	6^{9}	1
2	(Germany) Daniel Brands	7	6

Final
(Jamaica) Dustin Brown	4	4
2	(Germany) Daniel Brands	6	6

=== Top half ===
First round
1	(Austria) S Koubek	6	4	1
(Jamaica) D Brown	3	6	6
(Belgium) Y Mertens	2	5
(Italy) A Arnaboldi	6	7
(Austria) M Fischer	1	2
(Austria) P Oswald	6	6
WC	(Germany) P Gojowczyk	3	7	6
6	(Slovakia) D Hrbatý	6	6^{9}	4
3	(Slovenia) B Kavčič	7	4	6
(Germany) J Reister	6^{6}	6	2
(Germany) D Kindlmann	7	6
WC	(Germany) C-M Stiebe	5	2
(Czech Republic) R Vik	3	3
Q	(Germany) N Langer	6	6
(United Kingdom) A Bogdanović	7	3	6
7	(Germany) D Meffert	6^{4}	6	3

Second round
(Jamaica) D Brown	6	6
(Italy) A Arnaboldi	2	4
(Austria) P Oswald	2	6	5
WC	(Germany) P Gojowczyk	6	3	7
3	(Slovenia) B Kavčič	6	3	3
(Germany) D Kindlmann	4	6	6
Q	(Germany) N Langer	6	6^{3}	6
(United Kingdom) A Bogdanović	3	7	2

Quarterfinals
(Jamaica) D Brown	6	3	6
WC	(Germany) P Gojowczyk	3	6	3
(Germany) D Kindlmann	6	6
Q	(Germany) N Langer	4	2

Semifinals
(Jamaica) D Brown	3	7	7
(Germany) D Kindlmann	6	6^{4}	6^{5}

=== Bottom half ===
First round
8	(Germany) D Gremelmayr	6	1	3
(Austria) A Peya	1	6	6
(United Kingdom) J Goodall	3	7	6
LL	(Finland) T Nieminen	6	6^{4}	4
Q	(Germany) B Knittel	6	6
(France) V Millot	3	2
WC	(Germany) K Krawietz	3	6^{0}
4	(France) S de Chaunac	6	7
5	(Czech Republic) L Rosol	6	6
WC	(Germany) M Zimmermann	1	4
(Italy) A Stoppini	4	6	7
Q	(Croatia) N Mektić	6	4	6^{7}
(Croatia) A Veić	6^{4}	1
Q	(Netherlands) A van der Duim	7	6
(Czech Republic) J Minář	6^{2}	6^{3}
2	(Germany) D Brands	7	7

Second round
(Austria) A Peya	6	2
(United Kingdom) J Goodall	4	0	r
Q	(Germany) B Knittel	3	2
4	(France) S de Chaunac	6	6
5	(Czech Republic) L Rosol	6	6
(Italy) A Stoppini	4	4
Q	(Netherlands) A van der Duim	6^{2}	6	5
2	(Germany) D Brands	7	3	7

Quarterfinals
(Austria) A Peya	4	6^{2}
4	(France) S de Chaunac	6	7
5	(Czech Republic) L Rosol	4	4
2	(Germany) D Brands	6	6

Semifinals
4	(France) S de Chaunac	6^{9}	1
2	(Germany) D Brands	7	6
