= 2011 Bauer Watertechnology Cup – Singles =

Singles
- 2011 Bauer Watertechnology Cup

Final
- Champion: (United States) Rajeev Ram
- Runner-up: (Slovakia) Karol Beck
- Score: 6–4, 6–2

Events
Singles	Doubles
← 2010 ·	Bauer Watertechnology Cup	· 2012 →

Igor Sijsling was the defending champion, but lost in the first round to Kevin Krawietz.
Rajeev Ram won the title, defeating Karol Beck 6–4, 6–2 in the final.

== Seeds ==
1. (Germany) Philipp Petzschner (second round)
2. (Germany) Cedrik-Marcel Stebe (first round)
3. (Slovakia) Karol Beck (final)
4. (Germany) Andreas Beck (semifinals)
5. (Japan) Go Soeda (second round)
6. (Slovenia) Grega Žemlja (second round)
7. (Tunisia) Malek Jaziri (second round, retired)
8. (Netherlands) Igor Sijsling (first round)

== Draw ==
=== Key ===
- Q = Qualifier
- WC = Wild card
- LL = Lucky loser
- Alt = Alternate
- SE = Special exempt
- PR = Protected ranking
- ITF = ITF entry
- JE = Junior exempt
- w/o = Walkover
- r = Retired
- d = Defaulted
- SR = Special ranking

=== Finals ===
Semifinals
(Germany) Daniel Brands	4	4
3	(Slovakia) Karol Beck	6	6
4	(Germany) Andreas Beck	6^{4}	6^{5}
(United States) Rajeev Ram	7^{7}	7^{7}

Final
3	(Slovakia) Karol Beck	4	2
(United States) Rajeev Ram	6	6

=== Top half ===
First round
1/WC	(Germany) P Petzschner	6	6^{6}	6
(Canada) F Dancevic	4	7^{8}	3
(Belgium) R Bemelmans	6	6
WC	(Germany) R Kern	4	2
LL	(Austria) P Oswald	5	4
(Germany) D Brands	7	6
(Germany) J Reister	4	4
7	(Tunisia) M Jaziri	6	6
3	(Slovakia) K Beck	6	6
(Poland) M Przysiężny	2	3
Q	(Germany) M Zverev	3	6	6
(Republic of Ireland) C Niland	6	3	3
(Serbia) I Bozoljac	2	7^{7}	6
Q	(Germany) A Begemann	6	6^{4}	3
WC	(Germany) K Krawietz	7^{9}	7^{7}
8	(Netherlands) I Sijsling	6^{7}	6^{5}

Second round
1/WC	(Germany) P Petzschner	6	3	4
(Belgium) R Bemelmans	1	6	6
(Germany) D Brands	6^{3}	6	3
7	(Tunisia) M Jaziri	7^{7}	2	2^{r}
3	(Slovakia) K Beck	6	3	6
Q	(Germany) M Zverev	3	6	3
(Serbia) I Bozoljac	5	r
WC	(Germany) K Krawietz	7

Quarterfinals
(Belgium) R Bemelmans	5	4
(Germany) D Brands	7	6
3	(Slovakia) K Beck	7^{11}	6
WC	(Germany) K Krawietz	6^{9}	2

Semifinals
(Germany) D Brands	4	4
3	(Slovakia) K Beck	6	6

=== Bottom half ===
First round
6	(Slovenia) G Žemlja	7	6
(Austria) M Fischer	5	4
Q	(Germany) J-L Struff	5	1
(Czech Republic) J Hernych	7	6
(Poland) J Janowicz	6	6
(Russia) A Kudryavtsev	2	1
Q	(Czech Republic) J Mertl	6^{2}	7^{8}	2
4	(Germany) A Beck	7^{7}	6^{6}	6
5	(Japan) G Soeda	4	7^{7}	6
WC	(Germany) M Zimmermann	6	6^{5}	2
(Portugal) J Sousa	5	6^{5}
(United States) R Ram	7	7^{7}
(Romania) M Copil	4	4
(Germany) D Brown	6	6
(Lithuania) L Grigelis	6	6
2	(Germany) C-M Stebe	4	4

Second round
6	(Slovenia) G Žemlja	4	6	6^{6}
(Czech Republic) J Hernych	6	2	7^{8}
(Poland) J Janowicz	4	6	6^{7}
4	(Germany) A Beck	6	2	7^{9}
5	(Japan) G Soeda	5	4
(United States) R Ram	7	6
(Germany) D Brown	6	6
(Lithuania) L Grigelis	2	2

Quarterfinals
(Czech Republic) J Hernych	6^{4}	4
4	(Germany) A Beck	7^{7}	6
(United States) R Ram	7	6
(Germany) D Brown	5	3

Semifinals
4	(Germany) A Beck	6^{4}	6^{5}
(United States) R Ram	7^{7}	7^{7}
