= 2014 Bauer Watertechnology Cup – Singles =

Singles
- 2014 Bauer Watertechnology Cup

Final
- Champion: (Belgium) Ruben Bemelmans
- Runner-up: (Germany) Tim Pütz
- Score: 7–6^{(7–3)}, 6–3

Events
Singles	Doubles
- Bauer Watertechnology Cup

Benjamin Becker was the defending champion, but he did not compete that year.

Last year's runner up Ruben Bemelmans won the tournament, defeating Tim Pütz in the final 7–6^{(7–3)}, 6–3.

== Seeds ==
1. (Germany) Dustin Brown (second round)
2. (Germany) Andreas Beck (first round)
3. (Turkey) Marsel İlhan (second round)
4. (Russia) Evgeny Donskoy (quarterfinals)
5. (Italy) Luca Vanni (first round)
6. (Germany) Matthias Bachinger (second round)
7. (Ukraine) Denys Molchanov (first round)
8. (Italy) Andrea Arnaboldi (quarterfinals)

== Draw ==
Key

- Q = Qualifier
- WC = Wild card
- LL = Lucky loser
- Alt = Alternate
- ITF = ITF entry
- PR = Protected ranking
- SR = Special ranking
- SE = Special exempt
- JE = Junior exempt
- JR = Junior Accelerator Programme entrant
- CO = College Accelerator Programme entrant
- NG = Next Gen Accelerator Program entrant
- w/o = Walkover
- r = Retired
- d = Defaulted

=== Finals ===
Semifinals
(Belgium) Niels Desein	6	2	1
(Germany) Tim Pütz	2	6	6
Q	(Bosnia and Herzegovina) Mirza Bašić	2	1
(Belgium) Ruben Bemelmans	6	6

Final
(Germany) Tim Pütz	6^{3}	3
(Belgium) Ruben Bemelmans	7^{7}	6

=== Top half ===
First round
1	(Germany) D Brown	6	6^{1}	6
(Belarus) U Ignatik	3	7^{7}	1
(Belgium) N Desein	2	7^{7}	7^{7}
(Austria) M Fischer	6	6^{3}	6^{5}
WC	(Germany) J Härteis	6	5	6
(Russia) A Karatsev	3	7	3
(Sweden) E Ymer	3	4
8	(Italy) A Arnaboldi	6	6
4	(Russia) E Donskoy	6	6
WC	(Germany) P Petzschner	2	3
Q	(Croatia) A Šančić	3	6	4
(Georgia (country)) N Basilashvili	6	2	6
(Croatia) N Mektić	5	2
(Germany) T Pütz	7	6
WC	(Germany) K Krawietz	3	2
6	(Germany) M Bachinger	6	6

Second round
1	(Germany) D Brown	6^{5}	4
(Belgium) N Desein	7^{7}	6
WC	(Germany) J Härteis	4	3
8	(Italy) A Arnaboldi	6	6
4	(Russia) E Donskoy	6^{6}	7^{9}	6
(Georgia (country)) N Basilashvili	7^{8}	6^{7}	2
(Germany) T Pütz	4	7^{6}	6
6	(Germany) M Bachinger	6	6^{3}	3

Quarterfinals
(Belgium) N Desein	7	3	6
8	(Italy) A Arnaboldi	5	6	1
4	(Russia) E Donskoy	4	6	6^{6}
(Germany) T Pütz	6	3	7^{8}

Semifinals
(Belgium) N Desein	6	2	1
(Germany) T Pütz	2	6	6

=== Bottom half ===
First round
7	(Ukraine) D Molchanov	3	2
PR	(Ukraine) S Bubka	6	6
Q	(Russia) D Matsukevich	6	6
(Republic of Ireland) L Sorensen	4	4
(Belarus) E Gerasimov	1	1
Q	(Bosnia and Herzegovina) M Bašić	6	6
(Slovakia) J Kovalík	4	5
3	(Turkey) M İlhan	6	7
5	(Italy) L Vanni	5	4
(Slovakia) M Mečíř Jr.	7	6
(Russia) K Kravchuk	7^{8}	6
WC	(Germany) M Marterer	6^{6}	3
(Belgium) R Bemelmans	6^{1}	6	7^{7}
Q	(Croatia) F Veger	7^{1}	3	6^{5}
(Germany) D Brands	6	7^{7}
2	(Germany) A Beck	4	6^{4}

Second round
PR	(Ukraine) S Bubka	3	3
Q	(Russia) D Matsukevich	6	6
Q	(Bosnia and Herzegovina) M Bašić	7^{9}	6
3	(Turkey) M İlhan	6^{7}	3
(Slovakia) M Mečíř Jr.	6	3	2
(Russia) K Kravchuk	3	6	6
(Belgium) R Bemelmans	6	1	6
(Germany) D Brands	4	6	2

Quarterfinals
Q	(Russia) D Matsukevich	6	5	1
Q	(Bosnia and Herzegovina) M Bašić	2	7	6
(Russia) K Kravchuk	1	5
(Belgium) R Bemelmans	6	7

Semifinals
Q	(Bosnia and Herzegovina) M Bašić	2	1
(Belgium) R Bemelmans	6	6
