= 2011 Bauer Watertechnology Cup – Doubles =

Doubles
- 2011 Bauer Watertechnology Cup

Final
- Champions: (Germany) Andre Begemann (Russia) Alexandre Kudryavtsev
- Runners-up: (United States) James Cerretani (Canada) Adil Shamasdin
- Score: 6–3, 3–6, [11–9]

Events
Singles	Doubles
← 2010 ·	Bauer Watertechnology Cup	· 2012 →

Scott Lipsky and Rajeev Ram were the defending champions but Lipsky decided not to participate.
Ram plays alongside Dustin Brown, losing in the first round.
Andre Begemann and Alexandre Kudryavtsev won the title against James Cerretani and Adil Shamasdin 6–3, 3–6, [11–9].

== Seeds ==
1. (Germany) Dustin Brown / (United States) Rajeev Ram (first round)
2. (United States) James Cerretani / (Canada) Adil Shamasdin (final)
3. (Germany) Philipp Marx / (Slovakia) Igor Zelenay (quarterfinals)
4. (Germany) Philipp Petzschner / (Germany) Alexander Waske (semifinals)

== Draw ==
=== Key ===
- Q = Qualifier
- WC = Wild card
- LL = Lucky loser
- Alt = Alternate
- SE = Special exempt
- PR = Protected ranking
- ITF = ITF entry
- JE = Junior exempt
- w/o = Walkover
- r = Retired
- d = Defaulted
- SR = Special ranking

=== Draw ===
First round
1	(Germany) D Brown (United States) R Ram	4	4
(Italy) A Motti (Slovenia) G Žemlja	6	6
WC	(Germany) J-L Struff (Germany) M Zimmermann	6	2	[13]
(Germany) A Begemann (Russia) A Kudryavtsev	3	6	[15]
4	(Germany) P Petzschner (Germany) A Waske	7^{7}	6
(Austria) M Fischer (Austria) P Oswald	6^{5}	4
WC	(Czech Republic) J Mertl (Germany) Andreas Tattermüsch	w/o
(France) P-H Herbert (Poland) M Przysiężny
WC	(Germany) D Brands (Germany) K Krawietz	3	6	[10]
(Canada) F Dancevic (Japan) G Soeda	6	4	[5]
(Germany) A Beck (Austria) J Knowle	6^{4}	4
3	(Germany) P Marx (Slovakia) I Zelenay	7^{7}	6
(Sweden) J Brunström (United Kingdom) K Skupski	4	1^{r}
(Belgium) R Bemelmans (France) O Charroin	6	1
(Poland) Bednarek (Poland) M Kowalczyk	6^{2}	4
2	(United States) J Cerretani (Canada) A Shamasdin	7^{7}	6

Quarterfinals
(Italy) A Motti (Slovenia) G Žemlja	6	3	[9]
(Germany) A Begemann (Russia) A Kudryavtsev	4	6	[11]
4	(Germany) P Petzschner (Germany) A Waske	6	7
WC	(Czech Republic) J Mertl (Germany) A Tattermüsch	2	5
WC	(Germany) D Brands (Germany) K Krawietz	6	7^{7}
3	(Germany) P Marx (Slovakia) I Zelenay	4	6^{5}
(Belgium) R Bemelmans (France) O Charroin	5	6^{6}
2	(United States) J Cerretani (Canada) A Shamasdin	7	7^{8}

Semifinals
(Germany) A Begemann (Russia) A Kudryavtsev	7^{12}	6^{4}	[10]
4	(Germany) P Petzschner (Germany) A Waske	6^{10}	7^{7}	[4]
WC	(Germany) D Brands (Germany) K Krawietz	7^{12}	5	[7]
2	(United States) J Cerretani (Canada) A Shamasdin	6^{10}	7	[10]

Final
(Germany) A Begemann (Russia) A Kudryavtsev	6	3	[11]
2	(United States) J Cerretani (Canada) A Shamasdin	3	6	[9]
