= 2016 Bauer Watertechnology Cup =

- Date: 31 October – 6 November
- Edition: 20th
- Surface: Carpet
- Location: Eckental, Germany

Champions

Singles
- (Belgium) Steve Darcis

Doubles
- (Germany) Kevin Krawietz / (France) Albano Olivetti
← 2015 ·	Bauer Watertechnology Cup	· 2017 →

The 2016 Bauer Watertechnology Cup was a professional tennis tournament played on carpet courts. It was the 20th edition of the tournament which was part of the 2016 ATP Challenger Tour. It took place in Eckental, Germany between 31 October and 6 November 2016.

== Singles main-draw entrants ==
=== Seeds ===
Country	Player	Rank^{1}	Seed
GER	Florian Mayer	55	1
RUS	Daniil Medvedev	106	2
GER	~~Benjamin Becker~~	~~113~~	~~3~~
SVK	Andrej Martin	114	4
BEL	Steve Darcis	115	5
SVK	Lukáš Lacko	117	6
RUS	Teymuraz Gabashvili	118	7
GER	Tobias Kamke	124	8

- ^{1} Rankings are as of 24 October 2016.

=== Other entrants ===
The following players received wildcards into the singles main draw:

- (Germany) Florian Mayer
- (Germany) Yannick Hanfmann
- (Austria) Jürgen Melzer
- (Germany) Matthias Bachinger

The following player received entry into the singles main draw with a protected ranking:

- (France) Albano Olivetti

The following players received entry from the qualifying draw:

- (Australia) Alex De Minaur
- (Germany) Oscar Otte
- (Germany) Tim Pütz
- (Russia) Alexey Vatutin

The following players entered as a lucky losers:

- (Germany) Kevin Krawietz
- (Austria) David Pichler

== Champions ==
=== Singles ===
- (Belgium) Steve Darcis def. (Australia) Alex De Minaur, 6–4, 6–2.

=== Doubles ===
- (Germany) Kevin Krawietz / (France) Albano Olivetti def. (Czech Republic) Roman Jebavý / (Slovakia) Andrej Martin, 6–7^{(8–10)}, 6–4, [10–7].
