= 2013 Bauer Watertechnology Cup =

- Date: 28 October – 3 November
- Edition: 17th
- Surface: Carpet
- Location: Eckental, Germany

Champions

Singles
- (Germany) Benjamin Becker

Doubles
- (Germany) Dustin Brown / (Germany) Philipp Marx
← 2012 ·	Bauer Watertechnology Cup	· 2014 →

The 2013 Bauer Watertechnology Cup was a professional tennis tournament played on carpet courts. It was the 17th edition of the tournament which was part of the 2013 ATP Challenger Tour. It took place in Eckental, Germany between October 28 and November 3, 2013.

== Singles main-draw entrants ==
=== Seeds ===
Country	Player	Rank^{1}	Seed
GER	Benjamin Becker	72	1
UKR	Oleksandr Nedovyesov	121	2
ITA	Matteo Viola	129	3
CAN	Frank Dancevic	132	4
GER	Dustin Brown	134	5
LTU	Ričardas Berankis	135	6
BEL	Ruben Bemelmans	154	7
GER	Andreas Beck	190	8

- ^{1} Rankings are as of October 21, 2013.

=== Other entrants ===
The following players received wildcards into the singles main draw:

- (Germany) Kevin Krawietz
- (Germany) Robin Kern
- (Germany) Maximilian Marterer
- (Germany) Hannes Wagner

The following players received entry from the qualifying draw:

- (Poland) Piotr Gadomski
- (Hungary) Levente Gödry
- (Poland) Mateusz Kowalczyk
- (Croatia) Filip Veger

== Champions ==
=== Singles ===
- (Germany) Benjamin Becker def. (Belgium) Ruben Bemelmans 2–6, 7–6^{(7–3)}, 6–4

=== Doubles ===
- (Germany) Dustin Brown / (Germany) Philipp Marx def. (Poland) Piotr Gadomski / (Poland) Mateusz Kowalczyk 7–6^{(7–4)}, 6–2
