= 2016 Bauer Watertechnology Cup – Singles =

Singles
- 2016 Bauer Watertechnology Cup

Final
- Champion: (Belgium) Steve Darcis
- Runner-up: (Australia) Alex De Minaur
- Score: 6–4, 6–2

Events
Singles	Doubles
← 2015 ·	Bauer Watertechnology Cup	· 2017 →

Mikhail Youzhny was the defending champion but chose not to defend his title.

Steve Darcis won the title after defeating Alex De Minaur 6–4, 6–2 in the final.

== Seeds ==
1. (Germany) Florian Mayer (quarterfinals)
2. (Russia) Daniil Medvedev (quarterfinals)
3. (Germany) Benjamin Becker (withdrew)
4. (Slovakia) Andrej Martin (first round)
5. (Belgium) Steve Darcis (champion)
6. (Slovakia) Lukáš Lacko (first round)
7. (Russia) Teymuraz Gabashvili (first round)
8. (Germany) Tobias Kamke (second round)

== Draw ==
Key

- Q = Qualifier
- WC = Wild card
- LL = Lucky loser
- Alt = Alternate
- ITF = ITF entry
- PR = Protected ranking
- SR = Special ranking
- SE = Special exempt
- JE = Junior exempt
- JR = Junior Accelerator Programme entrant
- CO = College Accelerator Programme entrant
- NG = Next Gen Accelerator Program entrant
- w/o = Walkover
- r = Retired
- d = Defaulted

=== Finals ===
Semifinals
(Croatia) Franko Škugor	6^{5}	6^{1}
Q	(Australia) Alex De Minaur	7^{7}	7^{7}
5	(Belgium) Steve Darcis	6	6
LL	(Germany) Kevin Krawietz	3	1

Final
Q	(Australia) Alex De Minaur	4	2
5	(Belgium) Steve Darcis	6	6

=== Top half ===
First round
1/WC	(Germany) F Mayer	6	7^{7}
(Bosnia and Herzegovina) A Šetkić	4	6^{4}
WC	(Germany) Y Hanfmann	5	6	6
(Ukraine) S Stakhovsky	7	4	4
(Germany) P Gojowczyk	3	3
(Croatia) F Škugor	6	6
LL	(Austria) D Pichler	7	6
7	(Russia) T Gabashvili	5	3
Q	(Germany) O Otte	4	2
(Italy) F Gaio	6	6
(France) K de Schepper	3	5
Q	(Australia) A De Minaur	6	7
WC	(Austria) J Melzer	6	6
(Bosnia and Herzegovina) M Bašić	4	0
(Serbia) J Tipsarević	4	3
8	(Germany) T Kamke	6	6

Second round
1/WC	(Germany) F Mayer	6	1	6
WC	(Germany) Y Hanfmann	3	6	3
(Croatia) F Škugor	6	7
LL	(Austria) D Pichler	1	5
(Italy) F Gaio	3	3
Q	(Australia) A De Minaur	6	6
WC	(Austria) J Melzer	6	7^{8}
8	(Germany) T Kamke	3	6^{6}

Quarterfinals
1/WC	(Germany) F Mayer	2	6	3
(Croatia) F Škugor	6	2	6
Q	(Australia) A De Minaur	4	7^{7}	6
WC	(Austria) J Melzer	6	6^{3}	4

Semifinals
(Croatia) F Škugor	6^{5}	6^{1}
Q	(Australia) A De Minaur	7^{7}	7^{7}

=== Bottom half ===
First round
5	(Belgium) S Darcis	6	6
(Serbia) L Đere	2	3
(Belarus) U Ignatik	4	2
(Germany) M Marterer	6	6
(Egypt) M Safwat	7^{11}	6
PR	(France) A Olivetti	6^{9}	2
WC	(Germany) M Bachinger	6	6
4	(Slovakia) A Martin	3	4
6	(Slovakia) L Lacko	7	5	4
LL	(Germany) K Krawietz	5	7	6
(Romania) M Copil	7^{7}	4	6
Q	(Germany) T Pütz	6^{5}	6	4
Q	(Russia) A Vatutin	6	7^{7}
(Serbia) M Tepavac	4	6^{4}
(Belarus) I Ivashka	6	3	5
2	(Russia) D Medvedev	4	6	7

Second round
5	(Belgium) S Darcis	6^{5}	6	6
(Germany) M Marterer	7^{7}	4	4
(Egypt) M Safwat	4	0
WC	(Germany) M Bachinger	6	6
LL	(Germany) K Krawietz	4
(Romania) M Copil	2^{r}
Q	(Russia) A Vatutin	6^{6}	2
2	(Russia) D Medvedev	7^{8}	6

Quarterfinals
5	(Belgium) S Darcis	6	6
WC	(Germany) M Bachinger	4	2
LL	(Germany) K Krawietz	3	6	6
2	(Russia) D Medvedev	6	3	4

Semifinals
5	(Belgium) S Darcis	6	6
LL	(Germany) K Krawietz	3	1
