= 2011 Bauer Watertechnology Cup =

- Date: 31 October – 6 November
- Edition: 15th
- Location: Eckental, Germany

Champions

Singles
- (United States) Rajeev Ram

Doubles
- (Germany) Andre Begemann / (Russia) Alexander Kudryavtsev
← 2010 ·	Bauer Watertechnology Cup	· 2012 →

The 2011 Bauer Watertechnology Cup was a professional tennis tournament played on carpet courts. It was the 15th edition of the tournament and was part of the 2011 ATP Challenger Tour. It took place in Eckental, Germany between 31 October 2011 and 6 November 2011.

== ATP entrants ==
=== Seeds ===
Country	Player	Rank^{1}	Seed
GER	Philipp Petzschner	63	1
GER	Cedrik-Marcel Stebe	101	2
SVK	Karol Beck	102	3
GER	Andreas Beck	112	4
JPN	Go Soeda	119	5
SVN	Grega Žemlja	123	6
TUN	Malek Jaziri	140	7
NED	Igor Sijsling	147	8

- ^{1} Rankings are as of October 24, 2011.

=== Other entrants ===
The following players received wildcards into the singles main draw:

- (Germany) Robin Kern
- (Germany) Kevin Krawietz
- (Germany) Philipp Petzschner
- (Germany) Marcel Zimmermann

The following players received entry from the qualifying draw:

- (Germany) Andre Begemann
- (Czech Republic) Jan Mertl
- (Germany) Jan-Lennard Struff
- (Germany) Mischa Zverev

The following players received entry as a "lucky loser" into the singles main draw:

- (Austria) Philipp Oswald

== Champions ==
=== Singles ===
(United States) Rajeev Ram def. (Slovakia) Karol Beck, 6–4, 6–2

=== Doubles ===
(Germany) Andre Begemann / (Russia) Alexander Kudryavtsev def. (United States) James Cerretani / (Canada) Adil Shamasdin, 6–3, 3–6, [11–9]
