= 2012 Bauer Watertechnology Cup – Doubles =

Doubles
- 2012 Bauer Watertechnology Cup

Final
- Champions: (United States) James Cerretani (Canada) Adil Shamasdin
- Runners-up: (Poland) Tomasz Bednarek (Sweden) Andreas Siljeström
- Score: 6–3, 2–6, [10–4]

Events
Singles	Doubles
← 2011 ·	Bauer Watertechnology Cup	· 2013 →

Andre Begemann and Alexander Kudryavtsev were the defending champions but Kudryavtsev decided not to participate.
Begemann played alongside Martin Emmrich.
James Cerretani and Adil Shamasdin won the title, defeating Tomasz Bednarek and Andreas Siljeström 6–3, 2–6, [10–4] in the final.

== Seeds ==
1. (Germany) Andre Begemann / (Germany) Martin Emmrich (quarterfinals)
2. (United States) James Cerretani / (Canada) Adil Shamasdin (champions)
3. (Poland) Tomasz Bednarek / (Sweden) Andreas Siljeström (final)
4. (Czech Republic) Lukáš Dlouhý / (France) Albano Olivetti (semifinals)

== Draw ==
=== Key ===
- Q = Qualifier
- WC = Wild card
- LL = Lucky loser
- Alt = Alternate
- SE = Special exempt
- PR = Protected ranking
- ITF = ITF entry
- JE = Junior exempt
- w/o = Walkover
- r = Retired
- d = Defaulted
- SR = Special ranking

=== Draw ===
First round
1	(Germany) A Begemann (Germany) M Emmrich	6	6
WC	(Russia) Kirill Dmitriev (Russia) Alexey Vatutin	0	3
(Italy) G Naso (Italy) M Viola	3	2
(Latvia) A Juška (Austria) P Oswald	6	6
3	(Poland) T Bednarek (Sweden) A Siljeström	6	6
(Canada) É Chvojka (Republic of Ireland) J Cluskey	4	2
(Belarus) U Ignatik (Ukraine) O Nedovyesov	7^{7}	7
(Moldova) R Albot (Russia) D Matsukevitch	6^{1}	5
(Germany) D Brands (Germany) D Brown	4	7^{7}	[6]
Alt	(United States) Adham El-Effendi (United Kingdom) Darren Walsh	6	6^{5}	[10]
(Australia) R Junaid (Germany) D Meffert	3	6^{5}
4	(Czech Republic) L Dlouhý (France) A Olivetti	6	7^{7}
WC	(Germany) K Krawietz (Germany) Maximilian Marterer	4	6	[6]
WC	(Germany) N Langer (Germany) J-L Struff	6	3	[10]
(Czech Republic) J Mertl (Czech Republic) I Minář	4	4
2	(United States) J Cerretani (Canada) A Shamasdin	6	6

Quarterfinals
1	(Germany) A Begemann (Germany) M Emmrich	7^{9}	6^{4}	[5]
(Latvia) A Juška (Austria) P Oswald	6^{7}	7^{7}	[10]
3	(Poland) T Bednarek (Sweden) A Siljeström	6	6
(Belarus) U Ignatik (Ukraine) O Nedovyesov	3	2
Alt	(United States) A El-Effendi (United Kingdom) D Walsh	1	4
4	(Czech Republic) L Dlouhý (France) A Olivetti	6	6
WC	(Germany) N Langer (Germany) J-L Struff	2	3
2	(United States) J Cerretani (Canada) A Shamasdin	6	6

Semifinals
(Latvia) A Juška (Austria) P Oswald	7^{7}	2	[6]
3	(Poland) T Bednarek (Sweden) A Siljeström	6^{5}	6	[10]
4	(Czech Republic) L Dlouhý (France) A Olivetti	6	6^{5}	[8]
2	(United States) J Cerretani (Canada) A Shamasdin	1	7^{7}	[10]

Final
3	(Poland) T Bednarek (Sweden) A Siljeström	3	6	[4]
2	(United States) J Cerretani (Canada) A Shamasdin	6	2	[10]
