= 2010 Bauer Watertechnology Cup – Singles =

Singles
- 2010 Bauer Watertechnology Cup

Final
- Champion: (Netherlands) Igor Sijsling
- Runner-up: (Belgium) Ruben Bemelmans
- Score: 3–6, 6–2, 6–3

Events
Singles	Doubles
← 2009 ·	Bauer Watertechnology Cup	· 2011 →

Daniel Brands was the defending champion, but decided not to participate.
Igor Sijsling won this tournament, by defeating Ruben Bemelmans 3–6, 6–2, 6–3 in the final.

== Seeds ==
1. (Germany) Dustin Brown (semifinals)
2. (Slovenia) Blaž Kavčič (second round)
3. (Belgium) Steve Darcis (first round)
4. (Bulgaria) Grigor Dimitrov (first round)
5. (Italy) Simone Bolelli (second round)
6. (Lithuania) Ričardas Berankis (first round)
7. (Netherlands) Jesse Huta Galung (second round)
8. (Germany) Denis Gremelmayr (second round)

== Draw ==
=== Key ===
- Q = Qualifier
- WC = Wild card
- LL = Lucky loser
- Alt = Alternate
- ITF = ITF entry
- PR = Protected ranking
- SR = Special ranking
- SE = Special exempt
- JE = Junior exempt
- JR = Junior Accelerator Programme entrant
- CO = College Accelerator Programme entrant
- NG = Next Gen Accelerator Program entrant
- w/o = Walkover
- r = Retired
- d = Defaulted

=== Finals ===
Semifinals
1	(Germany) Dustin Brown	6^{5}	7	3
(Netherlands) Igor Sijsling	7	6^{4}	6
(Belgium) Ruben Bemelmans	7	6
Q	(United Kingdom) Alex Bogdanovic	6^{6}	4

Final
(Netherlands) Igor Sijsling	3	6	6
(Belgium) Ruben Bemelmans	6	2	3

=== Top half ===
First round
1	(Germany) D Brown	7	6^{5}	6
(Australia) M Ebden	6^{4}	7	4
Q	(Uzbekistan) F Dustov	3	1
WC	(Germany) M Bachinger	6	6
(Morocco) R El Amrani	3	4
(Czech Republic) L Rosol	6	6
WC	(Germany) J-L Struff	3	6	6
6	(Lithuania) R Berankis	6	3	4
3	(Belgium) S Darcis	6^{2}	5
Q	(Romania) M Copil	7	7
(Luxembourg) G Müller	4	6	7
(United States) R Ram	6	3	6
(Netherlands) I Sijsling	7	6
(Czech Republic) J Hernych	6^{7}	3
WC	(Germany) M Zimmermann	1	3
8	(Germany) D Gremelmayr	6	6

Second round
1	(Germany) D Brown	6	2	6
WC	(Germany) M Bachinger	4	6	2
(Czech Republic) L Rosol	6	6
WC	(Germany) J-L Struff	1	4
Q	(Romania) M Copil	6^{3}	6^{3}
(Luxembourg) G Müller	7	7
(Netherlands) I Sijsling	3	7	6
8	(Germany) D Gremelmayr	6	6^{2}	2

Quarterfinals
1	(Germany) D Brown	6	6
(Czech Republic) L Rosol	3	4
(Luxembourg) G Müller	7	4	5
(Netherlands) I Sijsling	6^{9}	6	7

Semifinals
1	(Germany) D Brown	6^{5}	7	3
(Netherlands) I Sijsling	7	6^{4}	6

=== Bottom half ===
First round
5	(Italy) S Bolelli	6	7
LL	(Denmark) F Nielsen	2	6^{2}
(Finland) H Kontinen	6^{4}	5
(Belgium) R Bemelmans	7	7
(Austria) S Koubek	7	6^{2}	4
(Germany) D Kindlmann	6^{2}	7	6
(Serbia) I Bozoljac	6	7
4	(Bulgaria) G Dimitrov	4	6^{4}
7	(Netherlands) J Huta Galung	6	1
WC	(Georgia (country)) L Chikhladze	7	3^{r}
(Italy) S Vagnozzi	3	0
Q	(United Kingdom) A Bogdanovic	6	6
Q	(Germany) B Knittel	7	6
(Italy) F Cipolla	5	0
(Germany) A Begemann	4	4
2	(Slovenia) B Kavčič	6	6

Second round
5	(Italy) S Bolelli	6^{3}	3
(Belgium) R Bemelmans	7	6
(Germany) D Kindlmann	6	3	4
(Serbia) I Bozoljac	4	6	6
7	(Netherlands) J Huta Galung	3	4
Q	(United Kingdom) A Bogdanovic	6	6
Q	(Germany) B Knittel	6	6
2	(Slovenia) B Kavčič	4	4

Quarterfinals
(Belgium) R Bemelmans	7	6
(Serbia) I Bozoljac	6^{1}	2
Q	(United Kingdom) A Bogdanovic	6	6
Q	(Germany) B Knittel	1	4

Semifinals
(Belgium) R Bemelmans	7	6
Q	(United Kingdom) A Bogdanovic	6^{6}	4
