= 2015 Bauer Watertechnology Cup =

- Date: 2–8 November
- Edition: 19th
- Surface: Carpet
- Location: Eckental, Germany

Champions

Singles
- (Russia) Mikhail Youzhny

Doubles
- (Belgium) Ruben Bemelmans / (Germany) Philipp Petzschner
← 2014 ·	Bauer Watertechnology Cup	· 2016 →

The 2015 Bauer Watertechnology Cup was a professional tennis tournament played on carpet courts. It was the 19th edition of the tournament which was part of the 2015 ATP Challenger Tour. It took place in Eckental, Germany between 2 November and 8 November 2015.

== Singles main-draw entrants ==
=== Seeds ===
Country	Player	Rank^{1}	Seed
LTU	Ričardas Berankis	75	1
BEL	Ruben Bemelmans	90	2
TUR	Marsel İlhan	97	3
GER	Benjamin Becker	108	4
GER	Dustin Brown	109	5
SVK	Lukáš Lacko	115	6
ITA	Luca Vanni	119	7
UZB	Farrukh Dustov	126	8

- ^{1} Rankings are as of 26 October 2015.

=== Other entrants ===
The following players received wildcards into the singles main draw:

- (Germany) Maximilian Marterer
- (Germany) Daniel Masur
- (Germany) Oscar Otte
- (Germany) Philipp Petzschner

The following player received entry into the singles main draw with a protected ranking:

- (Switzerland) Marco Chiudinelli

The following players received entry from the qualifying draw:

- (Belgium) Niels Desein
- (Hungary) Márton Fucsovics
- (Germany) Yannick Hanfmann
- (Croatia) Ante Pavić

The following player received entry as a lucky loser:

- (Czech Republic) Jan Hernych

== Champions ==
=== Singles ===
- (Russia) Mikhail Youzhny def. (Germany) Benjamin Becker 7–5, 6–3

=== Doubles ===
- (Belgium) Ruben Bemelmans / (Germany) Philipp Petzschner def. (United Kingdom) Ken Skupski / (United Kingdom) Neal Skupski 7–5, 6–2
