= 2014 Bauer Watertechnology Cup – Doubles =

Doubles
- 2014 Bauer Watertechnology Cup

Final
- Champion: (Belgium) Ruben Bemelmans (Belgium) Niels Desein
- Runner-up: (Germany) Andreas Beck (Germany) Philipp Petzschner
- Score: 6–3, 4–6, [10–8]

Events
Singles	Doubles
- Bauer Watertechnology Cup

Dustin Brown and Philipp Marx were the defending champions, but did not compete together this year. Brown partnered Christopher Kas and lost in the quarterfinals. Marx partnered Mateusz Kowalczyk and lost in the first round.

Ruben Bemelmans and Niels Desein won the title, defeating Andreas Beck and Philipp Petzschner in the final, 6–3, 4–6, [10–8].

== Seeds ==
1. (Belarus) Sergey Betov / (Belarus) Alexander Bury (quarterfinals)
2. (Germany) Philipp Marx / (Poland) Mateusz Kowalczyk (first round)
3. (Germany) Dustin Brown / (Germany) Christopher Kas (quarterfinals)
4. (Australia) Rameez Junaid / (Slovakia) Igor Zelenay (semifinals)

== Draw ==
Key

- Q = Qualifier
- WC = Wild card
- LL = Lucky loser
- Alt = Alternate
- ITF = ITF entry
- PR = Protected ranking
- SR = Special ranking
- SE = Special exempt
- JE = Junior exempt
- JR = Junior Accelerator Programme entrant
- CO = College Accelerator Programme entrant
- NG = Next Gen Accelerator Program entrant
- w/o = Walkover
- r = Retired
- d = Defaulted

=== Draw ===
First round
1	(Belarus) S Betov (Belarus) A Bury	6	6
(Russia) K Kravchuk (Ukraine) D Molchanov	1	2
(Belgium) R Bemelmans (Belgium) N Desein	6	6^{8}	[13]
(Germany) M Bachinger (Austria) M Fischer	3	7^{10}	[11]
3	(Germany) D Brown (Germany) C Kas	7	6
WC	(Germany) K Krawietz (Germany) M Marterer	5	2
WC	(Poland) Louis Donczyk (Hungary) Sebastien Farkas	4	4
(Poland) A Kapaś (Poland) B Koniusz	6	6
(Ukraine) S Bubka (Russia) E Donskoy	6	3	[9]
(Germany) D Meffert (Germany) T Pütz	3	6	[11]
WC	(Germany) M Emmrich (Germany) Kim Moellers	2	7^{7}	[3]
4	(Australia) R Junaid (Slovakia) I Zelenay	6	6^{5}	[10]
(Croatia) D Marcan (Croatia) A Šančić	4	6	[3]
(Belarus) E Gerasimov (Russia) A Karatsev	6	4	[10]
(Germany) A Beck (Germany) P Petzscner	7	7
2	(Poland) M Kowalczyk (Germany) P Marx	5	5

Quarterfinals
1	(Belarus) S Betov (Belarus) A Bury	2	3
(Belgium) R Bemelmans (Belgium) N Desein	6	6
3	(Germany) D Brown (Germany) C Kas	3	6^{4}
(Poland) A Kapaś (Poland) B Koniusz	6	7^{7}
(Germany) D Meffert (Germany) T Pütz	3	6^{4}
4	(Australia) R Junaid (Slovakia) I Zelenay	6	7^{7}
(Belarus) E Gerasimov (Russia) A Karatsev	5	5
(Germany) A Beck (Germany) P Petzscner	7	7

Semifinals
(Belgium) R Bemelmans (Belgium) N Desein	6	6
(Poland) A Kapaś (Poland) B Koniusz	4	4
4	(Australia) R Junaid (Slovakia) I Zelenay	3	4
(Germany) A Beck (Germany) P Petzscner	6	6

Final
(Belgium) R Bemelmans (Belgium) N Desein	6	4	[10]
(Germany) A Beck (Germany) P Petzscner	3	6	[8]
