= Antoine Hoang =

French tennis player

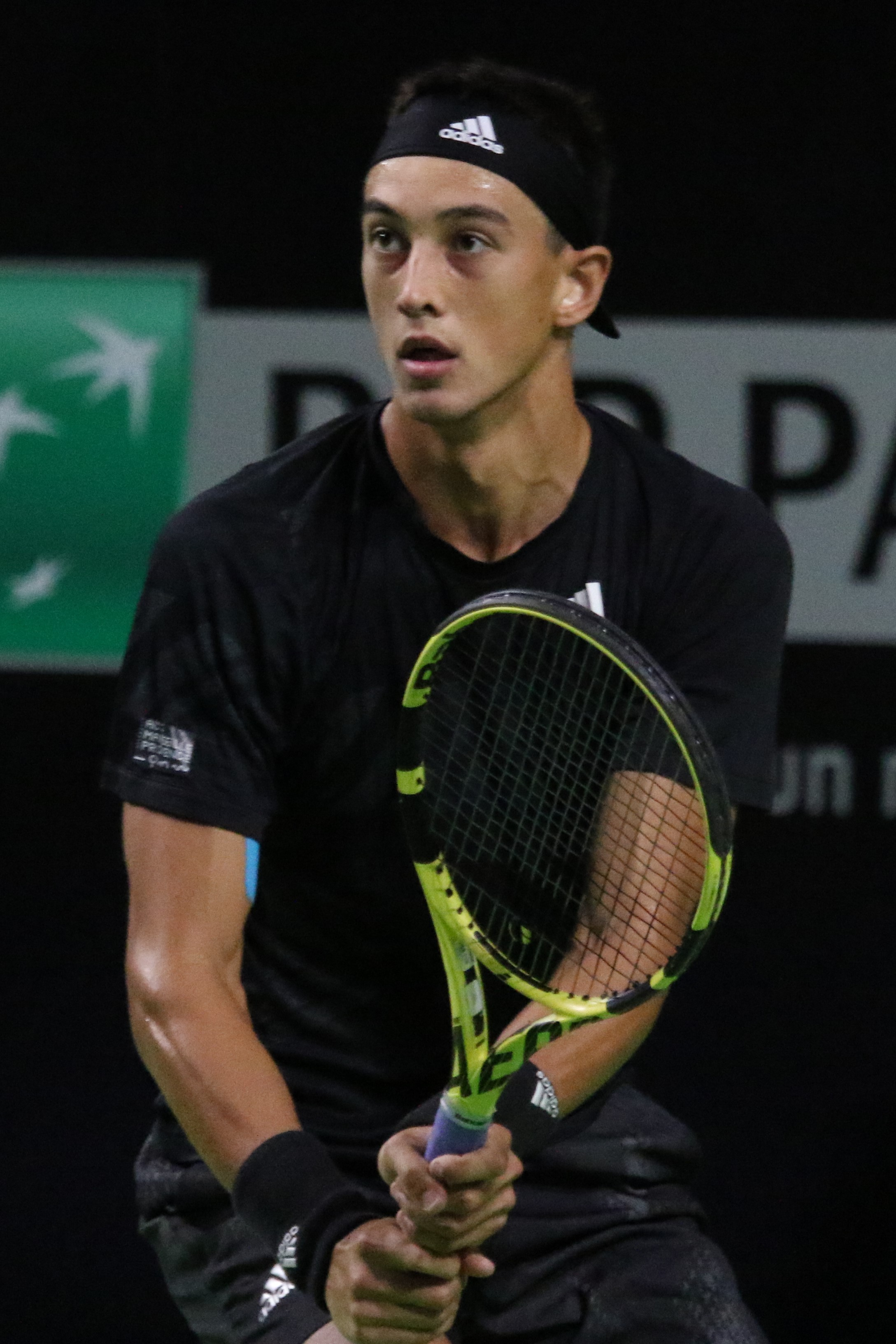
- Hoang at the 2021 Internationaux de Tennis de Vendée
- Country (sports): France
- Born: 4 November 1995 (age 30) Hyères, France
- Height: 1.83 m (6 ft 0 in)
- Turned pro: 2016
- Retired: February 2025 (last match played)
- Plays: Right-handed (two-handed backhand)
- Coach: Lionel Zimbler
- Prize money: US $1,123,574

Singles
- Career record: 6–13 (at ATP Tour level, Grand Slam level, and in Davis Cup)
- Career titles: 0
- Highest ranking: No. 98 (19 August 2019)

Grand Slam singles results
- Australian Open: Q2 (2021)
- French Open: 3R (2019)
- Wimbledon: 2R (2021)
- US Open: 2R (2019)

Doubles
- Career record: 7–10 (at ATP Tour level, Grand Slam level, and in Davis Cup)
- Career titles: 0
- Highest ranking: No. 132 (18 October 2021)

Grand Slam doubles results
- French Open: 3R (2020)
- Last updated on: 1 September 2026.

Antoine Hoang (born 4 November 1995) is a French former professional tennis player. He has a career high ATP singles ranking of World No. 98 achieved on 19 August 2019 and a doubles ranking of No. 132 achieved on 18 October 2021.

== Professional career ==
=== 2018: ATP and Grand Slam doubles debut ===
Hoang made his ATP main draw debut at the 2018 Open 13 in the doubles draw partnering Alexandre Müller. He received a wild card for the main draw of the 2018 French Open in the doubles draw, partnering with Ugo Humbert.

=== 2019: First ATP singles win and doubles final, Major & top 100 debuts ===
He won his first ATP match in Montpellier against Steve Darcis in 2019 before losing to compatriot Jérémy Chardy and made the final in doubles, partnering Benjamin Bonzi.

On his Grand Slam singles debut at the 2019 French Open, Hoang reached the third round as a wildcard defeating 23rd seed Fernando Verdasco before losing to 14th seed compatriot Gaël Monfils. He reached a career high ranking of World No. 98 on 19 August 2019. He also made his debut as a wildcard at the US Open where he reached the second round defeating Leonardo Mayer in a five-set match before losing to 28th seed Nick Kyrgios.

=== 2020–2021: French Open doubles third round, Wimbledon singles debut ===
At the 2020 French Open in doubles as a wildcard Hoang reached the third round for the first time in his career partnering Benjamin Bonzi where they were defeated by 8th seeded German duo and eventual champions from Germany Kevin Krawietz/Andreas Mies. He received a wildcard for the singles main draw as well.

Hoang qualified for the first time and reached the second round of the 2021 Wimbledon Championships on his debut where he defeated fellow qualifier Zhang Zhizhen in a five-set match before losing to Sebastian Korda.

== Grand Slam singles performance timeline ==
Key
W	F	SF	QF	#R	RR	Q#	DNQ	A	NH

(W) winner; (F) finalist; (SF) semifinalist; (QF) quarterfinalist; (#R) rounds 4, 3, 2, 1; (RR) round-robin stage; (Q#) qualification round; (DNQ) did not qualify; (A) absent; (NH) not held; (SR) strike rate (events won / competed); (W–L) win–loss record.
To avoid confusion and double counting, these charts are updated at the conclusion of a tournament or when the player's participation has ended.

Tournament	2018	2019	2020	2021	2022	2023	2024	SR	W–L	Win%
Australian Open	A	Q1	Q1	Q2	A	A	A	0 / 0	0–0	0%
French Open	Q1	3R	1R	Q1	Q1	A	A	0 / 2	2–2	50%
Wimbledon	Q2	Q2	NH	2R	Q2	A	A	0 / 1	1–1	50%
US Open	Q1	2R	A	1R	A	A	A	0 / 2	1–2	33%
Win–loss	0–0	3–2	0–1	1–2	0–0	0–0	0–0	0 / 5	4–5	44%

== ATP career finals ==
=== Doubles: 1 (1 runner-up) ===
Legend Grand Slam (0-0) ATP Masters 1000 (0-0) ATP 500 Sẻies (0-0) ATP 250 Series (0–1)	Finals by surface Hard (0–1) Clay (0–0) Grass (0–0)	Finals by setting Outdoor (0–0) Indoor (0–1)

Result	W–L	Date	Tournament	Tier	Surface	Partner	Opponents	Score
Loss	0–1	Feb 2019	Open Sud de France, France	250 Series	Hard (i)	(France) Benjamin Bonzi	(Croatia) Ivan Dodig (France) Édouard Roger-Vasselin	3–6, 3–6

== Challenger and Futures finals ==
=== Singles: 24 (7 titles, 17 runner-ups) ===
Legend (singles) ATP Challenger Tour (1–3) ITF Futures Tour (6–14)	Titles by surface Hard (4–9) Clay (2–6) Grass (0–0) Carpet (1–2)

Result	W–L	Date	Tournament	Tier	Surface	Opponent	Score
Loss	0–1	Nov 2015	Tunisia F31, El Kantaoui	Futures	Hard	(Serbia) Nikola Milojević	6–2, 5–7, 4–6
Win	1–1	Apr 2016	Tunisia F15, Hammamet	Futures	Clay	(Austria) Pascal Brunner	7–6^{(7–4)}, 6–2
Loss	1–2	Jul 2016	Germany F5, Kamen	Futures	Clay	(Belgium) Christopher Heyman	7–6^{(7–3)}, 2–6, 6–7^{(6–8)}
Loss	1–3	Jun 2017	Turkey F23, Istanbul	Futures	Clay	(Bolivia) Hugo Dellien	3–6, 2–6
Loss	1–4	Jul 2017	Germany F5, Kamen	Futures	Clay	(Russia) Aleksandr Vasilenko	3–6, 3–6
Loss	1–5	Jul 2017	France F17, Troyes	Futures	Clay	(Italy) Adelchi Virgili	6–2, 4–6, 3–6
Win	2–5	Aug 2017	Belgium F8, Eupen	Futures	Clay	(Belgium) Yannick Vandenbulcke	6–3, 6–1
Loss	2–6	Aug 2017	Belgium F9, Koksijde	Futures	Clay	(Belgium) Julien Cagnina	5–7, 6–3, 6–7^{(3–7)}
Win	3–6	Sep 2017	France F20, Plaisir	Futures	Hard (i)	(Netherlands) Igor Sijsling	4–6, 6–3, 6–4
Loss	3–7	Oct 2017	France F24, Rodez	Futures	Hard (i)	(Poland) Kamil Majchrzak	6–7^{(3–7)}, 6–2, 1–6
Win	4–7	Mar 2018	France F5, Poitiers	Futures	Hard (i)	(Netherlands) Igor Sijsling	3–6, 6–1, 6–4
Loss	4–8	Aug 2018	USA F23, Boston	Futures	Hard	(United States) Sekou Bangoura	5–7, 2–6
Loss	4–9	Sep 2018	Orléans, France	Challenger	Hard (i)	(Slovenia) Aljaž Bedene	6–4, 1–6, 6–7^{(6–8)}
Win	5–9	Nov 2018	Eckental, Germany	Challenger	Carpet (i)	(Belgium) Ruben Bemelmans	7–5, 6–3
Loss	5–10	Jan 2019	Rennes, France	Challenger	Hard (i)	(Lithuania) Ričardas Berankis	4–6, 2–6
Loss	5–11	Nov 2020	Ortisei, Italy	Challenger	Hard (i)	(Belarus) Ilya Ivashka	4–6, 6–3, 6–7^{(3–7)}
Win	6–11	Aug 2022	M25, Roehampton, Great Britain	ITF World Tennis Tour	Hard	(United Kingdom) Giles Hussey	6–4, 6–4
Win	7–11	Sep 2022	M25, Plaisir, France	ITF World Tennis Tour	Hard (i)	(Switzerland) Jérôme Kym	7–6^{(7–0)}, 6–3
Loss	7–12	Oct 2022	M25, Rodez, France	ITF World Tennis Tour	Hard (i)	(France) Alexis Gautier	6–7^{(5–7)}, 5–7
Loss	7–13	Jun 2023	M25, Carnac, France	ITF World Tennis Tour	Clay	(France) Lucas Poullain	6–4, 2–6, 2–6
Loss	7–14	Sep 2023	M25, Plaisir, France	ITF World Tennis Tour	Hard	(Germany) Mats Rosenkranz	3–6, 7–6^{(7–3)}, 6–7^{(3–7)}
Loss	7–15	Feb 2024	M15, Veigy-Foncenex, France	ITF World Tennis Tour	Carpet	(France) Arthur Bouquier	7–6^{(7–5)}, 4–6, 4–6
Loss	7–16	Feb 2024	M15, Grenoble, France	ITF World Tennis Tour	Hard	(France) Clément Chidekh	3–6, 6–2, 3–6
Loss	7–17	Mar 2024	M25, Trimbach, Switzerland	ITF World Tennis Tour	Carpet	(Germany) Mats Rosenkranz	1–6, 4–6

=== Doubles: 39 (22 titles, 17 runner-ups) ===
Legend (doubles) ATP Challenger Tour (3–5) ITF Futures Tour (19–12)	Titles by surface Hard (11–8) Clay (10–8) Grass (0–1) Carpet (1–0)

Result	W–L	Date	Tournament	Tier	Surface	Partner	Opponents	Score
Loss	0–1	Aug 2013	Belgium F8, Eupen	Futures	Clay	(Argentina) Gustavo Gómez Buyatti	(Belgium) Sander Gillé (Belgium) Joran Vliegen	3–6, 3–6
Win	1–1	Aug 2013	Belgium F9, Koksijde	Futures	Clay	(France) Alexandre Sidorenko	(Belgium) Robin Cambier (Belgium) Kevin Farin	6–3, 7–6^{(7–5)}
Loss	1–2	Aug 2014	Belgium F9, Ostend	Futures	Clay	(Belgium) Sander Gillé	(Netherlands) Scott Griekspoor (Netherlands) Alban Meuffels	2–6, 4–6
Loss	1–3	Jun 2015	Belgium F2, Damme	Futures	Clay	(Luxembourg) Ugo Nastasi	(Belgium) Sander Gillé (Belgium) Joran Vliegen	2–6, 3–6
Loss	1–4	Jun 2015	France F11, Toulon	Futures	Clay	(Belgium) Julien Cagnina	(France) David Guez (France) Alexis Musialek	3–6, 7–5, [5–10]
Loss	1–5	Jul 2015	Portugal F10, Castelo Branco	Futures	Hard	(France) Grégoire Jacq	(Portugal) Romain Barbosa (France) Benjamin Bonzi	6–7^{(8–10)}, 7–6^{(7–5)}, [7–10]
Win	2–5	Aug 2015	Belgium F12, Ostend	Futures	Clay	(Belgium) Joran Vliegen	(Netherlands) Kevin Benning (Belgium) Jonas Merckx	6–2, 7–5
Win	3–5	Sep 2015	Tunisia F24, El Kantaoui	Futures	Hard	(France) Louis Tessa	(Tunisia) Anis Ghorbel (Tunisia) Majed Kilani	6–4, 6–1
Win	4–5	Dec 2015	Tunisia F36, El Kantaoui	Futures	Hard	(France) Ronan Joncour	(Tunisia) Moez Echargui (Tunisia) Skander Mansouri	7–6^{(8–6)}, 7–6^{(7–0)}
Loss	4–6	Mar 2016	Italy F2, Basiglio	Futures	Hard (i)	(France) Grégoire Jacq	(Netherlands) David Pel (Netherlands) Antal van der Duim	4–6, 4–6
Loss	4–7	Mar 2016	Italy F3, Sondrio	Futures	Hard (i)	(France) Grégoire Jacq	(Sweden) Markus Eriksson (Brazil) Wilson Leite	4–6, 6–7^{(5–7)}
Win	5–7	Jul 2016	France F14, Saint-Gervais	Futures	Clay	(France) Louis Tessa	(China) Gao Xin (China) Ouyang Bowen	3–6, 6–4, [10–6]
Win	6–7	Aug 2016	Morocco F5, Tanger	Futures	Clay	(Belgium) Sander Gillé	(France) Gianni Mina (France) Alexandre Müller	6–4, 7–6^{(9–7)}
Win	7–7	Aug 2016	Belgium F9, Eupen	Futures	Clay	(Germany) Tom Schönenberg	(Netherlands) Roy Sarut de Valk (Netherlands) Jelle Sels	6–4, 6–3
Loss	7–8	Aug 2016	Netherlands F5, Oldenzaal	Futures	Clay	(France) Benjamin Bonzi	(Turkey) Altuğ Çelikbilek (Netherlands) Niels Lootsma	3–6, 3–6
Win	8–8	Sep 2016	Belgium F13, Arlon	Futures	Clay	(France) Corentin Denolly	(Belgium) Michael Geerts (Belgium) Jeroen Vanneste	6–3, 6–4
Win	9–8	Oct 2016	France F21, Nevers	Futures	Hard (i)	(France) Grégoire Jacq	(Venezuela) Jordi Muñoz Abreu (India) Ramkumar Ramanathan	6–3, 6–4
Win	10–8	Mar 2017	France F6, Poitiers	Futures	Hard (i)	(France) Grégoire Jacq	(Estonia) Vladimir Ivanov (Estonia) Kenneth Raisma	6–4, 6–4
Win	11–8	Apr 2017	Tunisia F14, Hammamet	Futures	Clay	(Morocco) Lamine Ouahab	(Bosnia and Herzegovina) Nerman Fatić (Italy) Davide Galoppini	6–3, 6–4
Loss	11–9	Apr 2017	Tunisia F15, Hammamet	Futures	Clay	(France) Geoffrey Blancaneaux	(Argentina) Franco Agamenone (Argentina) Hernán Casanova	5–7, 6–1, [5–10]
Loss	11–10	Apr 2017	Tunisia F16, Hammamet	Futures	Clay	(France) Benjamin Bonzi	(Bosnia and Herzegovina) Darko Bojanović (Sweden) Dragoș Nicolae Mădăraș	6–2, 4–6, [9–11]
Win	12–10	Jul 2017	France F17, Troyes	Futures	Clay	(France) Grégoire Jacq	(France) Constant de la Bassetière (France) Ugo Humbert	6–4, 6–0
Win	13–10	Aug 2017	Belgium F9, Koksijde	Futures	Clay	(France) Tak Khunn Wang	(Belgium) Romain Barbosa (Belgium) Omar Salman	6–1, 3–6, [10–8]
Loss	13–11	Sep 2017	France F20, Plaisir	Futures	Hard (i)	(France) Grégoire Jacq	(United States) Nathaniel Lammons (United States) Alex Lawson	6–4, 6–7^{(7–9)}, [4–10]
Win	14–11	Oct 2017	France F22, Nevers	Futures	Hard (i)	(France) Benjamin Bonzi	(United States) Nathaniel Lammons (United States) Alex Lawson	7–6^{(7–5)}, 6–4
Loss	14–12	Oct 2017	France F24, Rodez	Futures	Hard (i)	(France) Ugo Humbert	(United States) Nathaniel Lammons (United States) Alex Lawson	6–7^{(4–7)}, 6–4, [7–10]
Win	15-12	Jun 2019	Pau, France	Challenger	Hard (i)	(France) Benjamin Bonzi	(Italy) Simone Bolelli (Romania) Florin Mergea	6–3, 6–2
Win	16-12	Nov 2020	Eckental, Germany	Challenger	Carpet	(Germany) Dustin Brown	(United Kingdom) Lloyd Glasspool (United States) Alex Lawson	6–7^{(8–10)}, 7–5, [13–11]
Loss	16-13	Feb 2021	Cherbourg, France	Challenger	Hard (i)	(France) Albano Olivetti	(Slovakia) Lukáš Klein (Slovakia) Alex Molčan	6–1, 5–7, [6–10]
Win	17-13	Mar 2021	Lille, France	Challenger	Hard (i)	(France) Benjamin Bonzi	(France) Dan Added (Belgium) Michael Geerts	6–3, 6–1
Loss	17-14	June 2021	Nottingham, UK	Challenger	Grass	(France) Benjamin Bonzi	(Australia) Marc Polmans (Australia) Matt Reid	4–6, 6–4, [8–10]
Loss	17-15	Jul 2021	Trieste, Italy	Challenger	Clay	(France) Albano Olivetti	(Brazil) Orlando Luz (Brazil) Felipe Meligeni Alves	5–7, 7–6^{(8–6)}, [5–10]
Loss	17-16	Oct 2021	Orléans, France	Challenger	Hard (i)	(France) Kyrian Jacquet	(France) Pierre-Hugues Herbert (France) Albano Olivetti	2–6, 6–2, [9–11]
Win	18–16	Oct 2022	M25 Nevers, France	World Tennis Tour	Hard (i)	(France) Sascha Gueymard Wayenburg	(Argentina) Federico Agustín Gómez (United Kingdom) Marcus Willis	6–7^{(10–12)}, 7–6^{(7–5)}, [10–7]
Win	19–16	Feb 2023	M25 Faro, Portugal	World Tennis Tour	Hard	(France) Grégoire Jacq	(France) Lucas Poullain (France) Clément Tabur	6–0, 6–1
Win	20–16	Mar 2023	M15 Créteil, France	World Tennis Tour	Hard	(France) Sascha Gueymard Wayenburg	(France) Arthur Bouquier (France) Mathieu Scaglia	7–5, 5–7, [10–5]
Win	21–16	Mar 2023	M15 Poitiers, France	World Tennis Tour	Hard	(Belgium) Simon Beaupain	(France) Paul Cayre (France) Axel Garcian	2–6, 6–3, [10–3]
Win	22–16	Jun 2023	M25 Skopje, North Macedonia	World Tennis Tour	Clay	(France) Sascha Gueymard Wayenburg	(Bulgaria) Yanaki Milev (Bulgaria) Petr Nesterov	6–1, 6–2
Loss	22-17	Sep 2023	Cassis, France	Challenger	Hard	(United Kingdom) Liam Broady	(France) Dan Added (France) Jonathan Eysseric	0–6, 6–4, [9–11]
