= Johannes Härteis =

German tennis player

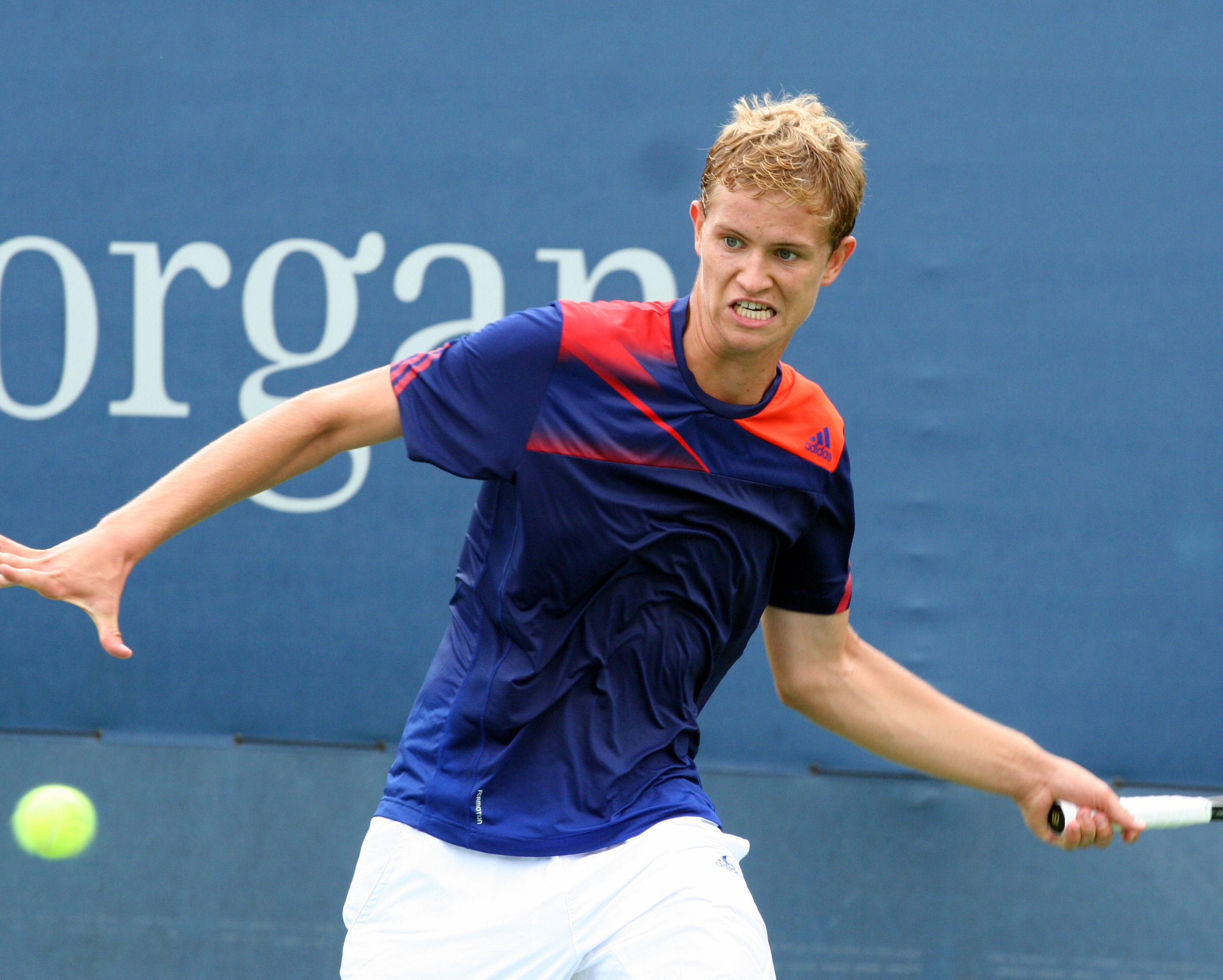
- Härteis at the 2013 US Open Juniors
- ITF name: Johannes Haerteis
- Country (sports): Germany
- Residence: Postbauer-Heng, Germany
- Born: 22 February 1996 (age 30) Nuremberg, Germany
- Height: 1.93 m (6 ft 4 in)
- Plays: Left-handed (two-handed backhand)
- Prize money: $119,206

Singles
- Career record: 0–0 (at ATP Tour level)
- Career titles: 0 ITF
- Highest ranking: No. 300 (23 November 2020)

Doubles
- Career record: 0–1 (at ATP Tour level)
- Career titles: 17 ITF
- Highest ranking: No. 335 (25 July 2016)

Johannes Härteis (born 22 February 1996) is a German tennis player.

Härteis achieved a career high ATP singles ranking of world No. 300 in November 2020.

He made his ATP main draw debut at the 2019 Hamburg European Open in the doubles competition, partnering Daniel Altmaier.

== ATP Challenger and ITF Futures finals ==
=== Singles: 2 (0–2) ===
Legend ATP Challenger Tour (0–0) ITF Futures Tour (0–2)	Finals by surface Hard (0–0) Clay (0–1) Grass (0–0) Carpet (0–1)

Result	W–L	Date	Tournament	Tier	Surface	Opponent	Score
Loss	0–1	Nov 2015	Germany F18, Ismaning	Futures	Carpet (i)	(Bosnia and Herzegovina) Aldin Šetkić	7–6^{(2–7)}, 6–7^{(6–8)}, 3–6
Loss	0–2	Jul 2018	Austria F2, Kramsach	Futures	Clay	(Bosnia and Herzegovina) Nerman Fatić	6–1, 3–6, 1–6
