= Eckental =

- Municipality
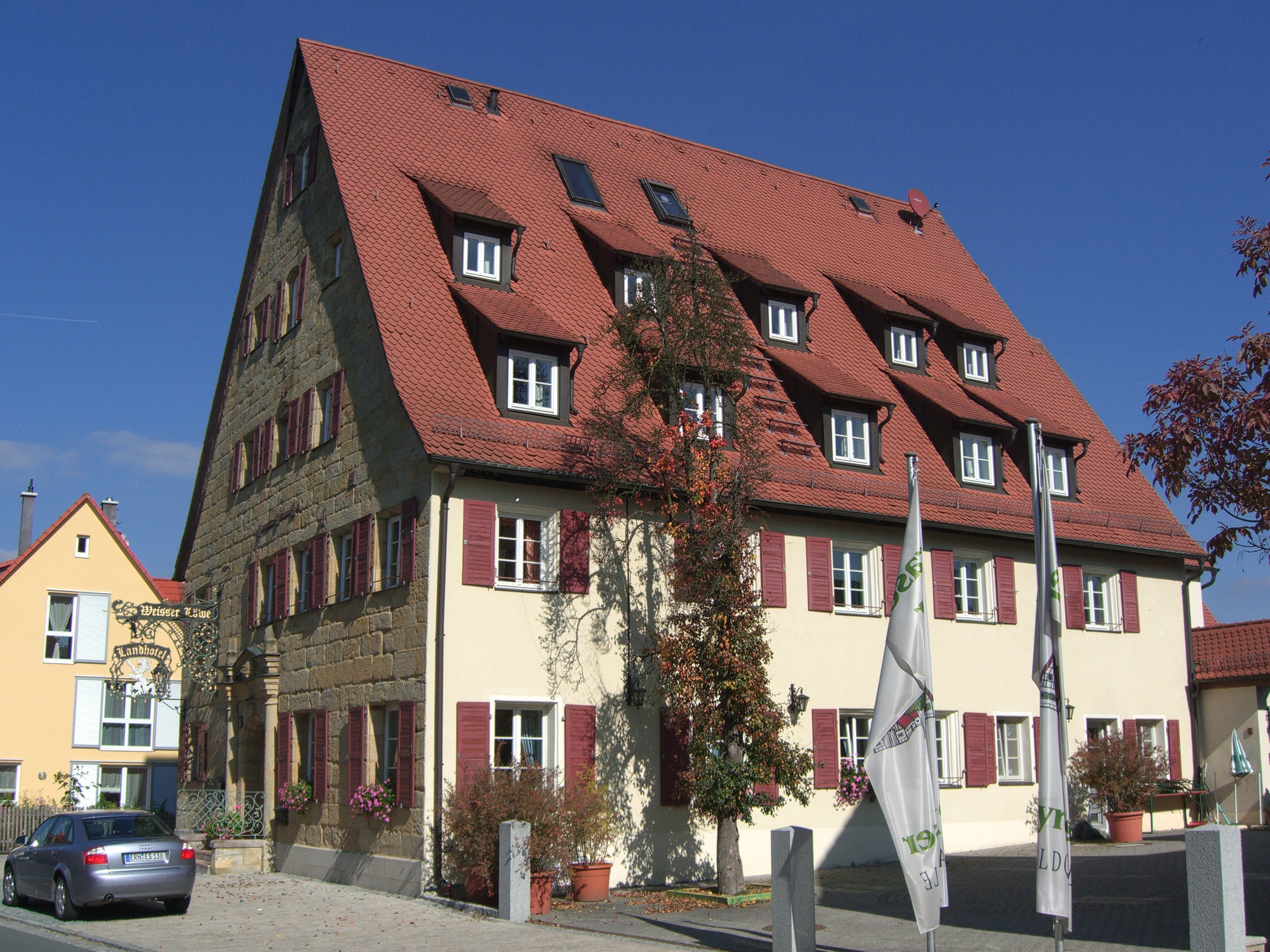
- Hotel Weißer Löwe in Eschenau

- Coat of arms

- Location of Eckental within Erlangen-Höchstadt district
- Interactive map of Eckental
- Location within Germany Location within Bavaria
- Coordinates: 49°34.57′N 11°12.35′E
- Country: Germany
- State: Bavaria
- Admin. region: Mittelfranken
- District: Erlangen-Höchstadt
- Subdivisions: 17 districts

Government
  - Mayor (2020–26): Ilse Dölle

Area
  - Total: 29.71 km^{2} (11.47 sq mi)
- Elevation: 350 m (1,150 ft)

Population (2025-12-31)
  - Total: 14,408
  - Density: 485.0/km^{2} (1,256/sq mi)
- Time zone: UTC+01:00 (CET)
  - Summer (DST): UTC+02:00 (CEST)
- Postal codes: 90542
- Dialling codes: 09126, 09192
- Vehicle registration: ERH, HÖS
- Website: www.eckental-mfr.de

Eckental is a municipality in the district of Erlangen-Höchstadt, in Bavaria, Germany. It is situated 14 km east of Erlangen, and 16 km northeast of Nuremberg. It contains 17 districts: Benzendorf, Brand, Brandermühle, Büg, Ebach, Eckenhaid, Eckenmühle, Eschenau, Forth, Frohnhof, Herpersdorf, Illhof, Marquardsburg, Mausgesees, Oberschöllenbach, Oedhof, and Unterschöllenbach.

== History ==
In 1972, the Bavarian government reduced its number of communities from 7,010 to 2,056. This forged together the market town Eschenau and the formerly independent communes Forth, Eckenhaid, Herpersdorf, Benzendorf, Oberschöllenbach, Unterschöllenbach, and parts of Pettensiedel under the newly invented name of Eckental. It was the same year that its coat of arms was designed. In 1978, the village Brand joined the administrative union. The individual villages were founded in the Middle Ages about in the middle of the 11th and 12th century.

The romantic church St Bartholomäus in Eschenau was built in the beginning of the 14th century, later burned down and rebuilt in the middle of the 15th century, it is the municipality's oldest church. Also there are ancient mansions in Brand, Eschenau, and Eckenhaid built between the 17th and 18th centuries.

== Coat of arms ==
The coat of arms has a golden background in front of it in the middle is a red post bearing a silver fish. On its left side is an armed black lion with a red crown and on the post's left side is a black goat. In the nether part is a blue wave, which symbolizes the Eckenbach, a small river from which the municipality's name derives. The crowned black lion and the silver fish were taken from the former coat of arms of Eschenau, into which they were copied from the blazon of the Patrician family Muffel, which ruled over the market town until 1751. The black goat on the other hand was copied from the crest of Forth, originally obtained by the barons von Gotzmann and is also supposed to remind of the different noble families who reigned over Forth and Büg.

== Organizations ==
Eckental hosts many organizations and clubs such as the scouts' association Pfadfinderbund Weltenbummler, the youth orchestra Jugendkapelle Eckental, two choral societies and a Sudeten German folk dance club, as well as different church organizations and volunteer fire departments. Also there is a variety of sports teams such as a chess club, a handball team, an athletics team, a martial arts team, a tennis team, two Schützenvereine, a fishing club and six different soccer teams. Since 2015 Eckental also hosts FLEck e.V., an organization that helps provide aid to arriving refugees.

== Additional information ==
Eckental is easily accessible by train from Nuremberg taking the RB21 from Nürnberg Nordost station or by car driving north on the Bundesstraße 2. Eckental has got a Gymnasium and a Mittelschule and also elementary schools in nearly all of its districts, a weekly magazine called the Wochenblatt and a public library. Also Eckental hosts an annual professional ATP Challenger Tour tennis tournament called the Bauer Watertechnology Cup.

== Twin towns ==
- Ambazac (France), since 1987
- Hőgyész (Hungary), since 1990
