= Challenger Eckental =

Tennis tournament in Germany

ATP Challenger Tour
- Location: Eckental, Germany
- Venue: House of Sports
- Category: ATP Challenger Tour
- Surface: Carpet / Indoors
- Draw: 32S/16D
- Prize money: €43,000
- Website: Website

The Challenger Eckental is a tennis tournament held in Eckental, Germany, since 1997. The event is part of the ATP Challenger Tour and is played on indoor carpet courts

== Past finals ==
=== Singles ===
Year	Champions	Runners-up	Score
2021	(Germany) Daniel Masur	(United States) Maxime Cressy	6–4, 6–4
2020	(United States) Sebastian Korda	(India) Ramkumar Ramanathan	6–4, 6–4
2019	(Czech Republic) Jiří Veselý	(Belgium) Steve Darcis	6–4, 4–6, 6–3
2018	(France) Antoine Hoang	(Belgium) Ruben Bemelmans	7–5, 6–3
2017	(Germany) Maximilian Marterer	(Poland) Jerzy Janowicz	7–6^{(10–8)}, 3–6, 6–3
2016	(Belgium) Steve Darcis	(Australia) Alex de Minaur	6–4, 6–2
2015	(Russia) Mikhail Youzhny	(Germany) Benjamin Becker	7–5, 6–3
2014	(Belgium) Ruben Bemelmans	(Germany) Tim Pütz	7–6^{(7–3)}, 6–3
2013	(Germany) Benjamin Becker	(Belgium) Ruben Bemelmans	2–6, 7–6^{(7–3)}, 6–4
2012	(Germany) Daniel Brands	(Latvia) Ernests Gulbis	7–6^{(7–0)}, 6–3
2011	(United States) Rajeev Ram	(Slovakia) Karol Beck	6–4, 6–2
2010	(Netherlands) Igor Sijsling	(Belgium) Ruben Bemelmans	3–6, 6–2, 6–3
2009	(Germany) Daniel Brands	(Jamaica) Dustin Brown	6–4, 6–4
2008	(Germany) Denis Gremelmayr	(Croatia) Roko Karanušić	6–2, 7–5
2007	(Germany) Denis Gremelmayr	(Croatia) Roko Karanušić	walkover
2006	(Latvia) Ernests Gulbis	(Germany) Philipp Petzschner	6–3, 6–0
2005	(Germany) Michael Berrer	(Belgium) Steve Darcis	6–3, 4–6, 6–4
2004	(Germany) Alexander Waske	(Germany) Lars Burgsmüller	7–5, 7–6
2003	(Netherlands) Dennis van Scheppingen	(Sweden) Joachim Johansson	5–7, 6–3, 7–6
2002	(Germany) Lars Burgsmüller	(Germany) Björn Phau	7–6, 5–7, 6–4
2001	(Germany) Alexander Popp	(Netherlands) Peter Wessels	6–4, 5–7, 6–2
2000	(Germany) Jens Knippschild	(France) Olivier Mutis	6–7, 7–6, 7–5
1999	(Switzerland) George Bastl	(Czech Republic) Petr Luxa	7–6, 4–6, 6–4
1998	(United States) Jared Palmer	(Austria) Wolfgang Schranz	7–6, 6–2
1997	(Germany) Rainer Schüttler	(Czech Republic) Petr Luxa	6–4, 6–1

=== Doubles ===
Year	Champions	Runners-up	Score
2021	(Czech Republic) Roman Jebavý (United Kingdom) Jonny O'Mara	(Belgium) Ruben Bemelmans (Germany) Daniel Masur	6–4, 7–5
2020	(Germany) Dustin Brown (France) Antoine Hoang	(United Kingdom) Lloyd Glasspool (United States) Alex Lawson	6–7^{(8–10)}, 7–5, [13–11]
2019	(United Kingdom) Ken Skupski (Australia) John-Patrick Smith	(Netherlands) Sander Arends (Czech Republic) Roman Jebavý	7–6^{(7–2)}, 6–4
2018	(Germany) Kevin Krawietz (Germany) Andreas Mies	(France) Hugo Nys (United Kingdom) Jonny O'Mara	6–1, 6–4
2017	(Netherlands) Sander Arends (Czech Republic) Roman Jebavý	(United Kingdom) Ken Skupski (United Kingdom) Neal Skupski	6–2, 6–4
2016	(Germany) Kevin Krawietz (France) Albano Olivetti	(Czech Republic) Roman Jebavý (Slovakia) Andrej Martin	6–7^{(8–10)}, 6–4, [10–7]
2015	(Belgium) Ruben Bemelmans (Germany) Philipp Petzschner	(United Kingdom) Ken Skupski (United Kingdom) Neal Skupski	7–5, 6–2
2014	(Belgium) Ruben Bemelmans (Belgium) Niels Desein	(Germany) Andreas Beck (Germany) Philipp Petzschner	6–3, 4–6, [10–8]
2013	(Germany) Dustin Brown (Germany) Philipp Marx	(Poland) Piotr Gadomski (Poland) Mateusz Kowalczyk	7–6^{(7–3)}, 6–2
2012	(United States) James Cerretani (Canada) Adil Shamasdin	(Poland) Tomasz Bednarek (Sweden) Andreas Siljeström	6–3, 2–6, [10–4]
2011	(Germany) Andre Begemann (Russia) Alexander Kudryavtsev	(United States) James Cerretani (Canada) Adil Shamasdin	6–3, 3–6, [11–9]
2010	(United States) Scott Lipsky (United States) Rajeev Ram	(Thailand) Sanchai Ratiwatana (Thailand) Sonchat Ratiwatana	6–7^{(2–7)}, 6–4, [10–4]
2009	(Germany) Michael Kohlmann (Austria) Alexander Peya	(Germany) Philipp Marx (Slovakia) Igor Zelenay	6–4, 7–6^{(4–7)}
2008	(Switzerland) Yves Allegro (Romania) Horia Tecău	(United Kingdom) James Auckland (Brazil) Márcio Torres	6–3, 3–6, [10–7]
2007	(Germany) Philipp Petzschner (Austria) Alexander Peya	(Germany) Philipp Marx (Germany) Lars Uebel	6–3, 6–4
2006	(United Kingdom) Joshua Goodall (United Kingdom) Ross Hutchins	(Netherlands) Sander Groen (Germany) Torsten Popp	7–5, 6–3
2005	(Germany) Christopher Kas (Germany) Philipp Petzschner	(Germany) Torsten Popp (Netherlands) Jasper Smit	6–3, 7–5
2004	(Germany) Christopher Kas (Germany) Philipp Petzschner	(Italy) Daniele Bracciali (Czech Republic) Petr Luxa	6–4, 7–6
2003	(Australia) Stephen Huss (Sweden) Robert Lindstedt	(Germany) Lars Burgsmüller (Germany) Andreas Tattermusch	walkover
2002	(Switzerland) Yves Allegro (Croatia) Lovro Zovko	(Germany) Philipp Petzschner (Germany) Simon Stadler	4–6, 7–6, 6–4
2001	(Switzerland) George Bastl (South Africa) Neville Godwin	(Switzerland) Yves Allegro (Germany) Marcus Hilpert	6–4, 4–6, 7–5
2000	(Germany) Karsten Braasch (Germany) Jens Knippschild	(Switzerland) Ivo Heuberger (Germany) Michael Kohlmann	7–6, 6–3
1999	(Czech Republic) Petr Pála (Czech Republic) Pavel Vízner	(Australia) Steven Randjelovic (Croatia) Lovro Zovko	6–4, 6–3
1998	(Czech Republic) Tomáš Cibulec (Netherlands) Raemon Sluiter	(United Kingdom) Barry Cowan (Switzerland) Filippo Veglio	7–6, 6–3
1997	(Germany) Lars Rehmann (Germany) Rainer Schüttler	(Austria) Georg Blumauer (Belarus) Max Mirnyi	6–4, 1–6, 6–3
