= 2010 Lambertz Open by STAWAG – Doubles =

Doubles
- 2010 Lambertz Open by STAWAG

Final
- Champions: (Belgium) Ruben Bemelmans (Netherlands) Igor Sijsling
- Runners-up: (United Kingdom) Jamie Delgado (United Kingdom) Jonathan Marray
- Score: 6–4, 3–6, [11–9]

Events
Singles	Doubles
← 2009 ·	Lambertz Open by STAWAG	· 2011 →

Rohan Bopanna and Aisam-ul-Haq Qureshi were the defending champions but chose to compete in the 2010 BNP Paribas Masters instead.
Ruben Bemelmans and Igor Sijsling won the title, defeating Jamie Delgado and Jonathan Marray 6–4, 3–6, [11–9] in the final.

== Seeds ==
1. (United States) Scott Lipsky / (United States) Rajeev Ram (quarterfinals)
2. (Germany) Dustin Brown / (Netherlands) Rogier Wassen (quarterfinals)
3. (Sweden) Johan Brunström / (United Kingdom) Dominic Inglot (semifinals, retired)
4. (United States) James Cerretani / (Czech Republic) David Škoch (quarterfinals)

== Draw ==
=== Key ===
- Q = Qualifier
- WC = Wild card
- LL = Lucky loser
- Alt = Alternate
- SE = Special exempt
- PR = Protected ranking
- ITF = ITF entry
- JE = Junior exempt
- w/o = Walkover
- r = Retired
- d = Defaulted
- SR = Special ranking

=== Draw ===
First round
1	(United States) S Lipsky (United States) R Ram	7	6
(Slovenia) B Kavčič (Croatia) F Škugor	6^{5}	4
(Belgium) R Bemelmans (Netherlands) I Sijsling	6	6
(Slovakia) A Martin (Czech Republic) L Rosol	3	2
3	(Sweden) J Brunström (United Kingdom) D Inglot	6	6
WC	(Germany) L Berger (Germany) W Peter	0	2
(Switzerland) Y Allegro (Austria) M Slanar	4	6^{7}
(Germany) D Gremelmayr (Germany) P Marx	6	7
WC	(Germany) N Kiefer (Germany) S Seifert	3	4
(United Kingdom) J Delgado (United Kingdom) J Marray	6	6
WC	(Serbia) M Djokovic (France) P-H Herbert	2	2
4	(United States) J Cerretani (Czech Republic) D Škoch	6	6
(Germany) A Begemann (Germany) M Emmrich	6	6^{8}	[9]
(Germany) G Kretschmer (Germany) S Stadler	4	7	[11]
(Lithuania) R Berankis (Serbia) I Bozoljac	4	7	[8]
2	(Germany) D Brown (Netherlands) R Wassen	6	5	[10]

Quarterfinals
1	(United States) S Lipsky (United States) R Ram	7	6^{4}	[14]
(Belgium) R Bemelmans (Netherlands) I Sijsling	6^{4}	7	[16]
3	(Sweden) J Brunström (United Kingdom) D Inglot	6^{9}	6	[10]
(Germany) D Gremelmayr (Germany) P Marx	7	4	[5]
(United Kingdom) J Delgado (United Kingdom) J Marray	6	6
4	(United States) J Cerretani (Czech Republic) D Škoch	4	3
(Germany) G Kretschmer (Germany) S Stadler	7	7
2	(Germany) D Brown (Netherlands) R Wassen	6^{3}	6^{2}

Semifinals
(Belgium) R Bemelmans (Netherlands) I Sijsling	2
3	(Sweden) J Brunström (United Kingdom) D Inglot	3	r
(United Kingdom) J Delgado (United Kingdom) J Marray	6	7
(Germany) G Kretschmer (Germany) S Stadler	4	6^{2}

Final
(Belgium) R Bemelmans (Netherlands) I Sijsling	6	3	[11]
(United Kingdom) J Delgado (United Kingdom) J Marray	4	6	[9]
