= 2010 Lambertz Open by STAWAG – Singles =

Singles
- 2010 Lambertz Open by STAWAG

Final
- Champion: (Germany) Dustin Brown
- Runner-up: (Netherlands) Igor Sijsling
- Score: 6–3, 7–6(3)

Events
Singles	Doubles
← 2009 ·	Lambertz Open by STAWAG	· 2011 →

Rajeev Ram is the defending champion, but lost to Dustin Brown at the semifinals.
Brown won the title, by defeating Igor Sijsling 6–3, 7–6(3) in the final.

== Seeds ==
1. (Germany) Dustin Brown (champion)
2. (Belgium) Steve Darcis (first round)
3. (Slovenia) Blaž Kavčič (quarterfinals)
4. (Bulgaria) Grigor Dimitrov (first round)
5. (Germany) Julian Reister (second round)
6. (Lithuania) Ričardas Berankis (first round)
7. (Netherlands) Jesse Huta Galung (quarterfinals)
8. (Germany) Denis Gremelmayr (second round)

== Draw ==
=== Key ===
- Q = Qualifier
- WC = Wild card
- LL = Lucky loser
- Alt = Alternate
- ITF = ITF entry
- PR = Protected ranking
- SR = Special ranking
- SE = Special exempt
- JE = Junior exempt
- JR = Junior Accelerator Programme entrant
- CO = College Accelerator Programme entrant
- NG = Next Gen Accelerator Program entrant
- w/o = Walkover
- r = Retired
- d = Defaulted

=== Finals ===
Semifinals
1	(Germany) Dustin Brown	6	7
(United States) Rajeev Ram	3	6^{4}
(Belgium) Ruben Bemelmans	7	2	6^{8}
(Netherlands) Igor Sijsling	6^{5}	6	7

Final
1	(Germany) Dustin Brown	6	7
(Netherlands) Igor Sijsling	3	6^{3}

=== Top half ===
First round
1	(Germany) D Brown	7	5	6
(Canada) V Pospisil	6^{6}	7	4
Q	(Switzerland) A Bossel	7	6
Q	(Belgium) M Authom	6^{3}	2
(Russia) A Kumantsov	5	4
Q	(France) P-H Herbert	7	6
(Germany) B Knittel	5	4
8	(Germany) D Gremelmayr	7	6
4	(Bulgaria) G Dimitrov	6	6^{5}	6^{4}
(United States) R Ram	3	7	7
WC	(Germany) W Peter	0	2
(Germany) S Stadler	6	6
(Croatia) F Škugor	6^{9}	6^{3}
(Serbia) I Bozoljac	7	7
(Romania) V Crivoi	3	3
7	(Netherlands) J Huta Galung	6	6

Second round
1	(Germany) D Brown	7	6
Q	(Switzerland) A Bossel	5	4
Q	(France) P-H Herbert	4	6	7
8	(Germany) D Gremelmayr	6	1	6^{5}
(United States) R Ram	7	7
(Germany) S Stadler	6^{7}	6^{6}
(Serbia) I Bozoljac	w/o
7	(Netherlands) J Huta Galung

Quarterfinals
1	(Germany) D Brown	6	6
Q	(France) P-H Herbert	1	1
(United States) R Ram	7	6
7	(Netherlands) J Huta Galung	6^{5}	4

Semifinals
1	(Germany) D Brown	6	7
(United States) R Ram	3	6^{4}

=== Bottom half ===
First round
6	(Lithuania) R Berankis	6	3	6^{5}
(Poland) J Janowicz	4	6	7
(Belgium) R Bemelmans	6	3	7
(United Kingdom) A Bogdanovic	3	6	6^{1}
(Germany) D Kindlmann	6	6
WC	(Germany) L Berger	0	2
Q	(France) B Dupuy	1	4
3	(Slovenia) B Kavčič	6	6
5	(Germany) J Reister	7	6^{5}	6
WC	(Serbia) M Djokovic	5	7	2
(Netherlands) I Sijsling	7	6
(Germany) A Begemann	6^{2}	3
WC	(Germany) G Kretschmer	4	6^{4}
(Slovakia) A Martin	6	7
(Czech Republic) L Rosol	6	6
2	(Belgium) S Darcis	3	4

Second round
(Poland) J Janowicz	6^{4}	5
(Belgium) R Bemelmans	7	7
(Germany) D Kindlmann	7	3	4
3	(Slovenia) B Kavčič	6^{5}	6	6
5	(Germany) J Reister	3	1
(Netherlands) I Sijsling	6	6
(Slovakia) A Martin	4	6	6
(Czech Republic) L Rosol	6	3	4

Quarterfinals
(Belgium) R Bemelmans	7	6
3	(Slovenia) B Kavčič	6^{6}	2
(Netherlands) I Sijsling	6	7
(Slovakia) A Martin	3	6^{5}

Semifinals
(Belgium) R Bemelmans	7	2	6^{8}
(Netherlands) I Sijsling	6^{5}	6	7
