= 2012 Bet-at-home Cup Kitzbühel =

- Date: 22–28 July
- Edition: 68th
- Category: World Tour 250 series
- Draw: 28S / 16D
- Surface: Clay / outdoor
- Location: Kitzbühel, Austria
- Venue: Tennis stadium Kitzbühel

Champions

Singles
- (Netherlands) Robin Haase

Doubles
- (Czech Republic) František Čermák / (Austria) Julian Knowle
- Bet-at-home Cup Kitzbühel

The 2012 Bet-at-home Cup Kitzbühel was a men's tennis tournament played on outdoor clay courts. It was the 68th edition of the Austrian Open Kitzbühel, as part of the World Tour 250 series of the 2012 ATP World Tour. It took place at the Tennis stadium Kitzbühel in Kitzbühel Austria, from 22 July until 28 July 2012. Third-seeded Robin Haase won the singles title.

== Finals ==
=== Singles ===
(Netherlands) Robin Haase defeated (Germany) Philipp Kohlschreiber, 6–7^{(2–7)}, 6–3, 6–2

=== Doubles ===
(Czech Republic) František Čermák / (Austria) Julian Knowle defeated (Germany) Dustin Brown / (Australia) Paul Hanley, 7–6^{(7–4)}, 3–6, [12–10]

== Singles main draw entrants ==
=== Seeds ===
| Country | Player | Rank^{1} | Seed |
|---|---|---|---|
| GER | Philipp Kohlschreiber | 22 | 1 |
| GER | Florian Mayer | 23 | 2 |
| NED | Robin Haase | 42 | 3 |
| ESP | Albert Ramos | 46 | 4 |
| SVK | Martin Kližan | 59 | 5 |
| ESP | Guillermo García López | 70 | 6 |
| LAT | Ernests Gulbis | 72 | 7 |
| SVN | Blaž Kavčič | 77 | 8 |

- ^{1} Seedings based on the July 16, 2012 rankings.

=== Other entrants ===
The following players received wildcards into the singles main draw:

- (Austria) Martin Fischer
- (Austria) Andreas Haider-Maurer
- (Austria) Dominic Thiem

The following players received entry from the qualifying draw:

- (Hungary) Attila Balázs
- (Slovakia) Pavol Červenák
- (Austria) Philipp Oswald
- (Croatia) Antonio Veić

=== Withdrawals ===
- (Brazil) Thomaz Bellucci (fatigue)
- (France) Jérémy Chardy
- (Argentina) Juan Ignacio Chela
- (Russia) Nikolay Davydenko
- (Spain) Juan Carlos Ferrero
- (Italy) Fabio Fognini
- (Germany) Tommy Haas (fatigue)
- (Croatia) Ivo Karlović
- (Poland) Łukasz Kubot
- (France) Édouard Roger-Vasselin (shoulder injury)
- (Romania) Adrian Ungur

== Doubles main draw entrants ==
=== Seeds ===
| Country | Player | Country | Player | Rank^{1} | Seed |
|---|---|---|---|---|---|
| CZE | František Čermák | AUT | Julian Knowle | 73 | 1 |
| GER | Dustin Brown | AUS | Paul Hanley | 94 | 2 |
| GER | Michael Kohlmann | GER | Florian Mayer | 116 | 3 |
| RUS | Mikhail Elgin | GER | Frank Moser | 122 | 4 |

- Rankings are as of July 16, 2012

=== Other entrants ===
The following pairs received wildcards into the doubles main draw:

- (Austria) Martin Fischer / (Austria) Philipp Oswald
- (Germany) Philipp Kohlschreiber / (Austria) Stephan Tumphart
