= 2012 Bet-at-home Cup Kitzbühel – Singles =

Singles
- 2012 Bet-at-home Cup Kitzbühel

Final
- Champion: (Netherlands) Robin Haase
- Runner-up: (Germany) Philipp Kohlschreiber
- Score: 6–7^{(2–7)}, 6–3, 6–2

Details
- Draw: 28
- Seeds: 8

Events
Singles	Doubles
- Bet-at-home Cup Kitzbühel

Defending champion and third-seeded Robin Haase successfully defended his title, defeating Philipp Kohlschreiber in the final, 6–7^{(2–7)}, 6–3, 6–2 to win the singles tennis title at the 2012 Bet-at-home Cup Kitzbühel.

== Seeds ==
The top four seeds receive a bye into the second round.

1. (Germany) Philipp Kohlschreiber (final)
2. (Germany) Florian Mayer (second round)
3. (Netherlands) Robin Haase (champion)
4. (Spain) Albert Ramos (second round)
5. (Slovakia) Martin Kližan (semifinals)
6. (Spain) Guillermo García López (first round)
7. (Latvia) Ernests Gulbis (second round)
8. (Slovenia) Blaž Kavčič (first round)

== Draw ==
Key

- Q = Qualifier
- WC = Wild card
- LL = Lucky loser
- Alt = Alternate
- ITF = ITF entry
- PR = Protected ranking
- SR = Special ranking
- SE = Special exempt
- JE = Junior exempt
- JR = Junior Accelerator Programme entrant
- CO = College Accelerator Programme entrant
- NG = Next Gen Accelerator Program entrant
- w/o = Walkover
- r = Retired
- d = Defaulted

=== Finals ===
Semifinals
1	(Germany) Philipp Kohlschreiber	6^{6}	6	6
(Italy) Filippo Volandri	7^{8}	2	2
3	(Netherlands) Robin Haase	6	6
5	(Slovakia) Martin Kližan	3	3

Final
1	(Germany) Philipp Kohlschreiber	7^{7}	3	2
3	(Netherlands) Robin Haase	6^{2}	6	6

=== Top half ===
First round
WC	(Austria) M Fischer	3	6	6^{2}
Q	(Hungary) A Balázs	6	1	7^{7}
(Russia) T Gabashvili	6^{4}	1
(Czech Republic) L Rosol	7^{7}	6
Q	(Croatia) A Veić	6	6
8	(Slovenia) B Kavčič	1	2
(Italy) A Giannessi	6	4	3
(Italy) F Volandri	1	6	6
(Czech Republic) J Hájek	1^{r}
(Brazil) R Dutra da Silva	4
WC	(Austria) A Haider-Maurer	6	5	1
7	(Latvia) E Gulbis	2	7	6

Second round
1	(Germany) P Kohlschreiber	6	6
Q	(Hungary) A Balázs	4	1
(Czech Republic) L Rosol	6	5	6
Q	(Croatia) A Veić	3	7	3
4	(Spain) A Ramos	4	4
(Italy) F Volandri	6	6
(Brazil) R Dutra da Silva	6	6
7	(Latvia) E Gulbis	4	4

Quarterfinals
1	(Germany) P Kohlschreiber	6	2	6
(Czech Republic) L Rosol	4	6	4
(Italy) F Volandri	6	6
(Brazil) R Dutra da Silva	4	4

Semifinals
1	(Germany) P Kohlschreiber	6^{6}	6	6
(Italy) F Volandri	7^{8}	2	2

=== Bottom half ===
First round
6	(Spain) G García López	1	3
(Estonia) J Zopp	6	6
(Brazil) J Souza	7	4	3
(United States) W Odesnik	5	6	6
Q	(Austria) P Oswald	4	6	6
(Germany) D Brands	6	2	3
5	(Slovakia) M Kližan	6	3	7
WC	(Austria) D Thiem	1	6	5
Q	(Slovakia) P Červenák	4	7^{7}	6
(Spain) R Ramírez Hidalgo	6	6^{1}	3
(Argentina) H Zeballos	5	5
(Italy) S Bolelli	7	7

Second round
(Estonia) J Zopp	7	5	3
(United States) W Odesnik	5	7	6
Q	(Austria) P Oswald	4	6	2
3	(Netherlands) R Haase	6	3	6
5	(Slovakia) M Kližan	6	6
Q	(Slovakia) P Červenák	4	4
(Italy) S Bolelli	6	7^{7}
2	(Germany) F Mayer	2	6^{4}

Quarterfinals
(United States) W Odesnik	2	4
3	(Netherlands) R Haase	6	6
5	(Slovakia) M Kližan	1	7	6
(Italy) S Bolelli	6	5	1

Semifinals
3	(Netherlands) R Haase	6	6
5	(Slovakia) M Kližan	3	3

== Qualifying ==
=== Seeds ===
The top six seeds receive a bye into the second round.

1. (Croatia) Antonio Veić (qualified)
2. (Brazil) Thiago Alves (second round)
3. (Germany) Dustin Brown (qualifying competition)
4. (Spain) Javier Martí (second round)
5. (Slovakia) Pavol Červenák (qualified)
6. (Romania) Marius Copil (qualifying competition)
7. (Austria) Philipp Oswald (qualified)
8. (Hungary) Attila Balázs (qualified)

=== Qualifiers ===
1. (Croatia) Antonio Veić
2. (Austria) Philipp Oswald
3. (Hungary) Attila Balázs
4. (Slovakia) Pavol Červenák

=== Draw ===
==== First qualifier ====
First round			Second round					Qualifying competition
			1	(Croatia) Antonio Veić	1	6	6
(Croatia) Mate Pavić	4	3		(Sweden) Christian Lindell	6	4	0
(Sweden) Christian Lindell	6	6						1	(Croatia) Antonio Veić	7	7
(Austria) Bastian Trinker	5	2						6	(Romania) Marius Copil	5	6^{4}
(Italy) Riccardo Bellotti	7	6		(Italy) Riccardo Bellotti	7^{8}	6^{6}	5
			6	(Romania) Marius Copil	6^{6}	7^{8}	7

==== Second qualifier ====
First round
(Germany) Frank Moser	6	6
WC	(United States) Jack Anton	1	2
(Bosnia and Herzegovina) Tomislav Brkić	3	7^{7}	7^{7}
(Slovakia) Ivo Klec	6	6^{3}	6^{5}
(Austria) Maximilian Neuchrist	3	6^{2}
7	(Austria) Philipp Oswald	6	7^{7}

Second round
2	(Brazil) Thiago Alves	6^{6}	2
(Germany) Frank Moser	7	6
(Bosnia and Herzegovina) Tomislav Brkić	3	2
7	(Austria) Philipp Oswald	6	6

Qualifying competition
(Germany) Frank Moser	6^{6}	4
7	(Austria) Philipp Oswald	7	6

==== Third qualifier ====
First round
(Austria) Gibril Diarra	7^{7}	3	4
(Austria) Marc Rath	6^{1}	6	6
(Russia) Mikhail Elgin	6	6
(Czech Republic) Jan Subota	0	2
(Croatia) Joško Topić	0	1
8	(Hungary) Attila Balázs	6	6

Second round
3	(Germany) Dustin Brown	6	6
(Austria) Marc Rath	2	4
(Russia) Mikhail Elgin	3	5
8	(Hungary) Attila Balázs	6	7

Qualifying competition
3	(Germany) Dustin Brown	1	7	4
8	(Hungary) Attila Balázs	6	5	6

==== Fourth qualifier ====
First round				Second round				Qualifying competition
				4	(Spain) Javier Martí	3	4
(Moldova) Maxim Dubarenco	6	3	2		(Romania) Victor Crivoi	6	6
(Romania) Victor Crivoi	4	6	6						(Romania) Victor Crivoi	7	3	3
(Poland) Mateusz Kowalczyk	7	6^{1}	1					5	(Slovakia) Pavol Červenák	5	6	6
(Austria) Dennis Novak	5	7^{7}	6		(Austria) Dennis Novak	2	3
				5	(Slovakia) Pavol Červenák	6	6
