= 2009 Lambertz Open by STAWAG – Singles =

Singles
- 2009 Lambertz Open by STAWAG

Final
- Champion: (United States) Rajeev Ram
- Runner-up: (Jamaica) Dustin Brown
- Score: 7–6(2), 6–7(5), 7–6(2)

Events
Singles	Doubles
← 2008 ·	Lambertz Open by STAWAG	· 2010 →

Evgeny Korolev, who was the defending champion, chose to not compete this year.
Rajeev Ram won in the final match 7–6(2), 6–7(5), 7–6(2), against Dustin Brown.

== Seeds ==
1. (United States) Rajeev Ram (champion)
2. (Austria) Stefan Koubek (first round)
3. (Germany) Daniel Brands (semifinals)
4. (Slovenia) Blaž Kavčič (second round)
5. (Belgium) Steve Darcis (quarterfinals)
6. (Germany) ~~Denis Gremelmayr~~ (withdrew)
7. (Germany) Julian Reister (second round)
8. (Germany) Dieter Kindlmann (second round, retired)

== Draw ==
=== Key ===
- Q = Qualifier
- WC = Wild card
- LL = Lucky loser
- Alt = Alternate
- SE = Special exempt
- PR = Protected ranking
- ITF = ITF entry
- JE = Junior exempt
- w/o = Walkover
- r = Retired
- d = Defaulted
- SR = Special ranking

=== Finals ===
Semifinals
1	(United States) Rajeev Ram	6	4	7
3	(Germany) Daniel Brands	3	6	6^{6}
(Belgium) Ruben Bemelmans	5	7	5
(Jamaica) Dustin Brown	7	6^{4}	7

Final
1	(United States) Rajeev Ram	7	6^{5}	7
(Jamaica) Dustin Brown	6^{2}	7	6^{2}

=== Top half ===
First round
1	(United States) R Ram	4	6	6
ALT	(Switzerland) A Sadecky	6	4	2
(Germany) M Bachinger	6	3	6^{3}
WC	(Germany) S Rieschick	3	6	7
(United States) L Cook	2	6	4
WC	(Germany) N Langer	6	4	6
(Croatia) A Veić	2	2
LL	(Republic of Ireland) L Sorensen	6	6
3	(Germany) D Brands	6	7
Q	(Germany) P Gojowczyk	3	6^{9}
(Poland) J Janowicz	5	7	4
(Belgium) N Desein	7	6^{6}	6
(Ukraine) S Bubka	7	1	4
(Croatia) I Dodig	6^{5}	6	6
(Italy) M Crugnola	5	4
5	(Belgium) S Darcis	7	6

Second round
1	(United States) R Ram	6	3	7
WC	(Germany) S Rieschick	4	6	5
WC	(Germany) N Langer	3	4
LL	(Republic of Ireland) L Sorensen	6	6
3	(Germany) D Brands	7	6
(Belgium) N Desein	5	3
(Croatia) I Dodig	5	1
5	(Belgium) S Darcis	7	6

Quarterfinals
1	(United States) R Ram	7	7
LL	(Republic of Ireland) L Sorensen	5	5
3	(Germany) D Brands	6	6
5	(Belgium) S Darcis	3	4

Semifinals
1	(United States) R Ram	6	4	7
3	(Germany) D Brands	3	6	6^{6}

=== Bottom half ===
First round
8	(Germany) D Kindlmann	6	7
(Italy) A Arnaboldi	1	5
(Belgium) R Bemelmans	6	6
(Romania) P-A Luncanu	2	4
Q	(Croatia) N Mektić	4	4
Q	(Poland) M Przysiężny	6	6
WC	(Germany) D Schulz	3	0
4	(Slovenia) B Kavčič	6	6
7	(Germany) J Reister	6	6
(Russia) E Kirillov	3	2
Q	(India) R Bopanna	2	5
(Germany) S Stadler	6	7
(Czech Republic) P Šnobel	4	6	5
(Serbia) B Pašanski	6	4	7
(Jamaica) D Brown	6^{3}	6	6
2	(Austria) S Koubek	7	4	2

Second round
8	(Germany) D Kindlmann	3	0	r
(Belgium) R Bemelmans	6	1
Q	(Poland) M Przysiężny	6	6
4	(Slovenia) B Kavčič	3	4
7	(Germany) J Reister	4	6	6
(Germany) S Stadler	6	1	7
(Serbia) B Pašanski	5	3
(Jamaica) D Brown	7	6

Quarterfinals
(Belgium) R Bemelmans	6	7
Q	(Poland) M Przysiężny	4	6
(Germany) S Stadler	4	6^{3}
(Jamaica) D Brown	6	7

Semifinals
(Belgium) R Bemelmans	5	7	5
(Jamaica) D Brown	7	6^{4}	7
