= 2009 Samarkand Challenger =

- Date: August 10 – August 16
- Edition: 13th
- Location: Samarkand, Uzbekistan

Champions

Singles
- (Jamaica) Dustin Brown

Doubles
- (Australia) Kaden Hensel / (Australia) Adam Hubble
- Samarkand Challenger

The 2009 Samarkand Challenger was a professional tennis tournament played on outdoor red clay courts. It was part of the 2009 ATP Challenger Tour. It took place in Samarkand, Uzbekistan between 10 and 16 August 2009.

== Singles entrants ==
=== Seeds ===
Nationality	Player	Ranking*	Seeding
RUS	Michail Elgin	150	1
SVK	Kamil Čapkovič	222	2
ARG	Diego Álvarez	225	3
ESP	Carles Poch-Gradin	262	4
FRA	Jonathan Dasnières de Veigy	274	5
UKR	Ivan Sergeyev	280	6
LAT	Deniss Pavlovs	290	7
JPN	Junn Mitsuhashi	303	8

- Rankings are as of August 3, 2009.

=== Other entrants ===
The following players received wildcards into the singles main draw:

- (Uzbekistan) Jakhongir Jalalov* (Uzbekistan) Farrukh Dustov
- (Uzbekistan) Vaja Uzakov
- (Uzbekistan) Sergey Shipilov

The following players received entry from the qualifying draw:

- (Australia) Kaden Hensel
- (South Korea) Jun Woong-sun
- (Russia) Mikhail Ledovskikh
- (Germany) Patrick Taubert

== Champions ==
=== Singles ===
(Jamaica) Dustin Brown def. (France) Jonathan Dasnières de Veigy, 7–6(3), 6–3

=== Doubles ===
(Australia) Kaden Hensel / (Australia) Adam Hubble def. (Russia) Valery Rudnev / (Ukraine) Ivan Sergeyev, 7–5, 7–5
