= 2010 Lambertz Open by STAWAG =

- Date: 8–14 November
- Edition: 20th
- Location: Aachen, Germany

Champions

Singles
- (Germany) Dustin Brown

Doubles
- (Belgium) Ruben Bemelmans / (Netherlands) Igor Sijsling
← 2009 ·	Lambertz Open by STAWAG	· 2011 →

The 2010 Lambertz Open by STAWAG was a professional tennis tournament played on carpet. It was the 20th edition of the tournament which is part of the 2010 ATP Challenger Tour. It took place in Aachen, Germany between 8 and 14 November 2010.

== ATP entrants ==
=== Seeds ===
Country	Player	Rank^{1}	Seed
GER	Dustin Brown	103	1
BEL	Steve Darcis	105	2
SVN	Blaž Kavčič	110	3
BUL	Grigor Dimitrov	112	4
GER	Julian Reister	116	5
LTU	Ričardas Berankis	117	6
NED	Jesse Huta Galung	121	7
GER	Denis Gremelmayr	133	8

- Rankings are as of November 1, 2010.

=== Other entrants ===
The following players received wildcards into the singles main draw:

- (Germany) Leif Berger
- (Serbia) Marko Djokovic
- (Germany) Gero Kretschmer
- (Germany) Willi Peter

The following players received entry from the qualifying draw:

- (Belgium) Maxime Authom
- (Switzerland) Adrien Bossel
- (France) Baptiste Dupuy
- (France) Pierre-Hugues Herbert

== Champions ==
=== Singles ===
(Germany) Dustin Brown def. (Netherlands) Igor Sijsling, 6–3, 7–6(3)

=== Doubles ===
(Belgium) Ruben Bemelmans / (Netherlands) Igor Sijsling def. (United Kingdom) Jamie Delgado / (United Kingdom) Jonathan Marray, 6–4, 3–6, [11–9]
