= 2009 Lambertz Open by STAWAG =

- Date: 9–15 November
- Edition: 19th
- Location: Aachen, Germany

Champions

Singles
- (United States) Rajeev Ram

Doubles
- (India) Rohan Bopanna / (Pakistan) Aisam-ul-Haq Qureshi
← 2008 ·	Lambertz Open by STAWAG	· 2010 →

The 2009 Lambertz Open by STAWAG was a professional tennis tournament played on indoor carpet courts. It was the nineteenth edition of the tournament which was part of the 2009 ATP Challenger Tour. It took place in Aachen, Germany between 9 and 15 November 2009.

== ATP entrants ==
=== Seeds ===
Country	Player	Rank^{1}	Seed
USA	Rajeev Ram	97	1
AUT	Stefan Koubek	115	2
GER	Daniel Brands	123	3
SLO	Blaž Kavčič	125	4
BEL	Steve Darcis	130	5
GER	~~Denis Gremelmayr~~	~~176~~	~~6~~
GER	Julian Reister	179	7
GER	Dieter Kindlmann	190	8

- Rankings are as of November 2, 2009.

=== Other entrants ===
The following players received wildcards into the singles main draw:

- (Germany) Dominik Schulz
- (Germany) Nils Langer
- (United States) Rajeev Ram
- (Germany) Sebastian Rieschick

The following players received entry from the qualifying draw:

- (India) Rohan Bopanna
- (Germany) Peter Gojowczyk
- (Croatia) Nikola Mektić
- (Poland) Michał Przysiężny
- (Republic of Ireland) Louk Sorensen (LL)

== Champions ==
=== Singles ===
(United States) Rajeev Ram def. (Jamaica) Dustin Brown, 7–6(2), 6–7(5), 7–6(2)

=== Doubles ===
(India) Rohan Bopanna / (Pakistan) Aisam-ul-Haq Qureshi def. (Germany) Philipp Marx / (Slovakia) Igor Zelenay, 6–4, 7–6(6)
