= 2009 Lambertz Open by STAWAG – Doubles =

Doubles
- 2009 Lambertz Open by STAWAG

Final
- Champions: (India) Rohan Bopanna (Pakistan) Aisam-ul-Haq Qureshi
- Runners-up: (Germany) Philipp Marx (Slovakia) Igor Zelenay
- Score: 6–4, 7–6(6)

Events
| Singles | Doubles |
- Lambertz Open by STAWAG

Michael Kohlmann and Alexander Waske didn't defend their title.

Kohlmann participated with Horia Tecău, but lost to Philipp Marx and Igor Zelenay in the semifinals.

Rohan Bopanna and Aisam-ul-Haq Qureshi defeated Marx and Zelenay 6–4, 7–6(6) in the final.

== Seeds ==
1. (Germany) Michael Kohlmann / (Romania) Horia Tecău (semifinals)
2. (India) Rohan Bopanna / (Pakistan) Aisam-ul-Haq Qureshi (champions)
3. (Germany) Philipp Marx / (Slovakia) Igor Zelenay (final)
4. (United States) James Cerretani / (Australia) Rameez Junaid (first round)

== Draw ==
Key

- Q = Qualifier
- WC = Wild card
- LL = Lucky loser
- Alt = Alternate
- ITF = ITF entry
- PR = Protected ranking
- SR = Special ranking
- SE = Special exempt
- JE = Junior exempt
- JR = Junior Accelerator Programme entrant
- CO = College Accelerator Programme entrant
- NG = Next Gen Accelerator Program entrant
- w/o = Walkover
- r = Retired
- d = Defaulted

=== Draw ===
First round
1 | (Germany) M Kohlmann (Romania) H Tecău | 6 | 6^{1} | [10]
(Slovenia) B Kavčič (Croatia) A Veić | 3 | 7 | [6]
WC | (Germany) B Knittel (Germany) S Rieschick | 7 | 6
(Ukraine) S Bubka (Russia) E Kirillov | 6^{4} | 1
3 | (Germany) P Marx (Slovakia) I Zelenay | 6 | 6
WC | (Germany) Michael Nowak (Germany) Willi Peter | 3 | 1
(United States) L Cook (Czech Republic) P Šnobel | 6 | 3 | [10]
(Poland) M Kowalczyk (Russia) D Matsukevich | 3 | 6 | [7]
(Croatia) I Dodig (Serbia) B Pašanski | 6 | 7
(United States) JP Fruttero (Italy) A Motti | 4 | 6^{6}
(Switzerland) Y Allegro (Croatia) L Zovko | 6 | 6
4 | (United States) J Cerretani (Australia) R Junaid | 3 | 3
(Belgium) R Bemelmans (Belgium) N Desein | 6^{4} | 3
(Jamaica) D Brown (Czech Republic) J Krkoška | 7 | 6
WC | (Croatia) N Mektić (Croatia) I Zovko | 5 | 2
2 | (India) R Bopanna (Pakistan) A-u-H Qureshi | 7 | 6

Quarterfinals
1 | (Germany) M Kohlmann (Romania) H Tecău | 7 | 7
WC | (Germany) B Knittel (Germany) S Rieschick | 6^{5} | 5
3 | (Germany) P Marx (Slovakia) I Zelenay | 6 | 6
(United States) L Cook (Czech Republic) P Šnobel | 2 | 4
(Croatia) I Dodig (Serbia) B Pašanski | 3 | 3
(Switzerland) Y Allegro (Croatia) L Zovko | 6 | 6
(Jamaica) D Brown (Czech Republic) J Krkoška | 5 | 6^{6}
2 | (India) R Bopanna (Pakistan) A-u-H Qureshi | 7 | 7

Semifinals
1 | (Germany) M Kohlmann (Romania) H Tecău | 6^{5} | 4
3 | (Germany) P Marx (Slovakia) I Zelenay | 7 | 6
(Switzerland) Y Allegro (Croatia) L Zovko | 3 | 4
2 | (India) R Bopanna (Pakistan) A-u-H Qureshi | 6 | 6

Final
3 | (Germany) P Marx (Slovakia) I Zelenay | 4 | 6^{6}
2 | (India) R Bopanna (Pakistan) A-u-H Qureshi | 6 | 7
