= 2009 Samarkand Challenger – Doubles =

Doubles
- 2009 Samarkand Challenger

Final
- Champions: (Australia) Kaden Hensel (Australia) Adam Hubble
- Runners-up: (Russia) Valery Rudnev (Ukraine) Ivan Sergeyev
- Score: 7–5, 7–5

Events
| Singles | Doubles |
- Samarkand Challenger

Irakli Labadze and Denis Matsukevich were the defending champions.
Kaden Hensel and Adam Hubble won in the final 7–5, 7–5, against Valery Rudnev and Ivan Sergeyev.

== Seeds ==
1. (Argentina) Diego Álvarez / (Spain) Carles Poch-Gradin (quarterfinals)
2. (Russia) Michail Elgin / (Russia) Evgeny Kirillov (semifinals)
3. (Kazakhstan) Alexey Kedryuk / (Latvia) Deniss Pavlovs (quarterfinals)
4. (Australia) Kaden Hensel / (Australia) Adam Hubble (champions)

== Draw ==
Key

- Q = Qualifier
- WC = Wild card
- LL = Lucky loser
- Alt = Alternate
- ITF = ITF entry
- PR = Protected ranking
- SR = Special ranking
- SE = Special exempt
- JE = Junior exempt
- JR = Junior Accelerator Programme entrant
- CO = College Accelerator Programme entrant
- NG = Next Gen Accelerator Program entrant
- w/o = Walkover
- r = Retired
- d = Defaulted

=== Draw ===
First round
1 | (Argentina) D Álvarez (Spain) C Poch-Gradin | 6 | 6
(Serbia) N Ćirić (Croatia) A Sančić | 2 | 3
(Russia) V Rudnev (Ukraine) I Sergeyev | 6 | 6
(United States) R Rizza (New Zealand) J Statham | 4 | 1
3 | (Kazakhstan) A Kedryuk (Latvia) D Pavlovs | 4 | 7 | [10]
(Kazakhstan) S Abdukhalikov (Japan) J Mitsuhashi | 6 | 6^{5} | [8]
WC | (Uzbekistan) R Biktyakov (Uzbekistan) V Uzakov | 0 | 4
(Chinese Taipei) H-h Lee (Chinese Taipei) T-h Yang | 6 | 6
(Jamaica) D Brown (Austria) R Eitzinger | 6 | 5 | [10]
(Ukraine) D Molchanov (Romania) G Moraru | 3 | 7 | [7]
(Slovakia) K Čapkovič (Slovakia) M Semjan | 2 | 3
4 | (Australia) K Hensel (Australia) A Hubble | 6 | 6
WC | (Uzbekistan) J Jalalov (Uzbekistan) S Shipilov | 1 | 0
(Australia) S Kadir (India) P Raja | 6 | 6
WC | (Chinese Taipei) T Chen (Uzbekistan) F Dustov | 3 | 4
2 | (Russia) M Elgin (Russia) E Kirillov | 6 | 6

Quarterfinals
1 | (Argentina) D Álvarez (Spain) C Poch-Gradin | 5 | 3
(Russia) V Rudnev (Ukraine) I Sergeyev | 7 | 6
3 | (Kazakhstan) A Kedryuk (Latvia) D Pavlovs | 1 | 7 | [3]
(Chinese Taipei) H-h Lee (Chinese Taipei) T-h Yang | 6 | 6^{4} | [10]
(Jamaica) D Brown (Austria) R Eitzinger | 3 | 6^{2}
4 | (Australia) K Hensel (Australia) A Hubble | 6 | 7
(Australia) S Kadir (India) P Raja | 2 | 4
2 | (Russia) M Elgin (Russia) E Kirillov | 6 | 6

Semifinals
(Russia) V Rudnev (Ukraine) I Sergeyev | 6 | 6
(Chinese Taipei) H-h Lee (Chinese Taipei) T-h Yang | 2 | 4
4 | (Australia) K Hensel (Australia) A Hubble | 6 | 6
2 | (Russia) M Elgin (Russia) E Kirillov | 3 | 2

Finals
(Russia) V Rudnev (Ukraine) I Sergeyev | 5 | 5
4 | (Australia) K Hensel (Australia) A Hubble | 7 | 7
