= 2009 Samarkand Challenger – Singles =

Singles
- 2009 Samarkand Challenger

Final
- Champion: (Jamaica) Dustin Brown
- Runner-up: (France) Jonathan Dasnières de Veigy
- Score: 7–6(3), 6–3

Events
Singles	Doubles
- Samarkand Challenger

Mikhail Elgin was the defending champion, but he was eliminated by his compatriot Valery Rudnev in the second round.
Dustin Brown defeated Jonathan Dasnières de Veigy 7–6(3), 6–3 in the final.

== Seeds ==
1. (Russia) Mikhail Elgin (second round)
2. (Slovakia) Kamil Čapkovič (quarterfinals)
3. (Argentina) Diego Álvarez (second round)
4. (Spain) Carles Poch Gradin (semifinals)
5. (France) Jonathan Dasnières de Veigy (final)
6. (Ukraine) Ivan Sergeyev (second round)
7. (Latvia) Deniss Pavlovs (first round)
8. (Japan) Junn Mitsuhashi (first round)

== Draw ==
Key

- Q = Qualifier
- WC = Wild card
- LL = Lucky loser
- Alt = Alternate
- ITF = ITF entry
- PR = Protected ranking
- SR = Special ranking
- SE = Special exempt
- JE = Junior exempt
- JR = Junior Accelerator Programme entrant
- CO = College Accelerator Programme entrant
- NG = Next Gen Accelerator Program entrant
- w/o = Walkover
- r = Retired
- d = Defaulted

=== Final four ===
Semifinals
5	(France) Jonathan Dasnières de Veigy	4	7	6
4	(Spain) Carles Poch Gradin	6	6^{6}	2
(Jamaica) Dustin Brown	6	6
(Russia) Evgeny Kirillov	4	2

Final
5	(France) Jonathan Dasnières de Veigy	6^{3}	3
(Jamaica) Dustin Brown	7	6

=== Top half ===
First round
1	(Russia) M Elgin	6	6
(New Zealand) J Statham	4	3
(Russia) V Rudnev	6	6
WC	(Uzbekistan) J Jalalov	3	2
Q	(Australia) K Hensel	7	7
(Chinese Taipei) T-h Yang	6^{4}	5
(Slovakia) M Semjan	1	6	4
5	(France) J Dasnières de Veigy	6	1	6
4	(Spain) C Poch-Gradin	6	6
(Austria) R Eitzinger	4	0
WC	(Uzbekistan) S Shipilov	4	1
(Serbia) N Ćirić	6	6
WC	(Uzbekistan) V Uzakov	7	6
(Romania) G Moraru	5	3
(France) G Rufin	6	6
8	(Japan) J Mitsuhashi	0	3

Second round
1	(Russia) M Elgin	0	6	2
(Russia) V Rudnev	6	4	6
Q	(Australia) K Hensel	5	4
5	(France) J Dasnières de Veigy	7	6
4	(Spain) C Poch-Gradin	7	7
(Serbia) N Ćirić	6^{6}	5
WC	(Uzbekistan) V Uzakov	4	2
(France) G Rufin	6	6

Quarterfinals
(Russia) V Rudnev	4	4
5	(France) J Dasnières de Veigy	6	6
4	(Spain) C Poch-Gradin
(France) G Rufin	w/o

Semifinals
5	(France) J Dasnières de Veigy	4	7	6
4	(Spain) C Poch-Gradin	6	6^{6}	2

=== Bottom half ===
First round
7	(Latvia) D Pavlovs	3	4
Q	(South Korea) W-s Jun	6	6
Q	(Germany) P Taubert	4	4
(Jamaica) D Brown	6	6
(Kazakhstan) A Kedryuk	2	1
(Belgium) D Goffin	6	6
(Italy) M Viola	3	6	5
3	(Argentina) D Álvarez	6	4	7
6	(Ukraine) I Sergeyev	6	6
(Croatia) A Sančić	4	2
(Chinese Taipei) T Chen	2	2
(Russia) E Kirillov	6	6
(Japan) K Takeuchi	2	2
Q	(Russia) M Ledovskikh	6	6
WC	(Uzbekistan) F Dustov	4	6	5
2	(Slovakia) K Čapkovič	6	3	7

Second round
Q	(South Korea) W-s Jun	4	5
(Jamaica) D Brown	6	7
(Belgium) D Goffin	6	6
3	(Argentina) D Álvarez	4	3
6	(Ukraine) I Sergeyev	1	0
(Russia) E Kirillov	6	6
Q	(Russia) M Ledovskikh	2	6	0
2	(Slovakia) K Čapkovič	6	4	6

Quarterfinals
(Jamaica) D Brown	6	6^{4}	7
(Belgium) D Goffin	2	7	5
(Russia) E Kirillov	6	6
2	(Slovakia) K Čapkovič	4	4

Semifinals
(Jamaica) D Brown	6	6
(Russia) E Kirillov	4	2
