= 2012 Bet-at-home Cup Kitzbühel – Doubles =

Doubles
- 2012 Bet-at-home Cup Kitzbühel

Final
- Champions: (Czech Republic) František Čermák (Austria) Julian Knowle
- Runners-up: (Germany) Dustin Brown (Australia) Paul Hanley
- Score: 7–6^{(7–4)}, 3–6, [12–10]

Details
- Draw: 16
- Seeds: 4

Events
| Singles | Doubles |
- Bet-at-home Cup Kitzbühel

The 2012 Bet-at-home Cup Kitzbühel Doubles was a men's tennis tournament played on outdoor clay courts in Kitzbühel, Austria.

Daniele Bracciali and Santiago González were the defending champions but decided not to participate.

== Seeds ==
1. (Czech Republic) František Čermák / (Austria) Julian Knowle (champions)
2. (Germany) Dustin Brown / (Australia) Paul Hanley (final)
3. (Germany) Michael Kohlmann / (Germany) Florian Mayer (first round)
4. (Russia) Mikhail Elgin / (Germany) Frank Moser (semifinals)

== Draw ==
Key

- Q = Qualifier
- WC = Wild card
- LL = Lucky loser
- Alt = Alternate
- ITF = ITF entry
- PR = Protected ranking
- SR = Special ranking
- SE = Special exempt
- JE = Junior exempt
- JR = Junior Accelerator Programme entrant
- CO = College Accelerator Programme entrant
- NG = Next Gen Accelerator Program entrant
- w/o = Walkover
- r = Retired
- d = Defaulted

=== Draw ===
First round
1 | (Czech Republic) F Čermák (Austria) J Knowle | 6 | 6
(Germany) A Begemann (Germany) M Emmrich | 4 | 2
(Czech Republic) L Rosol (Argentina) H Zeballos | 7 | 4 | [5]
WC | (Germany) P Kohlschreiber (Austria) S Tumphart | 5 | 6 | [10]
4 | (Russia) M Elgin (Germany) F Moser | 2 | 6 | [10]
(Brazil) R Dutra da Silva (Italy) F Volandri | 6 | 3 | [8]
WC | (Austria) M Fischer (Austria) P Oswald | 7 | 6
(Slovenia) B Kavčič (Slovakia) I Zelenay | 5 | 1
(Belgium) D Norman (Germany) A Waske | 7^{7} | 6
(Spain) R Ramírez Hidalgo (Spain) A Ramos | 6^{2} | 2
(Poland) T Bednarek (Poland) M Kowalczyk | 6 | 6
3 | (Germany) M Kohlmann (Germany) F Mayer | 1 | 2
(Germany) P Marx (Croatia) L Zovko | 7 | 6
(Spain) G García-López (Spain) D Marrero | 5 | 4
(Slovakia) M Kližan (Slovakia) M Mertiňák | 6 | 2 | [8]
2 | (Germany) D Brown (Australia) P Hanley | 2 | 6 | [10]

Quarterfinals
1 | (Czech Republic) F Čermák (Austria) J Knowle | 6 | 6
WC | (Germany) P Kohlschreiber (Austria) S Tumphart | 2 | 2
4 | (Russia) M Elgin (Germany) F Moser | 3 | 6 | [10]
WC | (Austria) M Fischer (Austria) P Oswald | 6 | 3 | [4]
(Belgium) D Norman (Germany) A Waske | 6 | 7^{7}
(Poland) T Bednarek (Poland) M Kowalczyk | 2 | 6^{5}
(Germany) P Marx (Croatia) L Zovko | 4 | 6^{8}
2 | (Germany) D Brown (Australia) P Hanley | 6 | 7^{10}

Semifinals
1 | (Czech Republic) F Čermák (Austria) J Knowle | 6 | 6^{4} | [10]
4 | (Russia) M Elgin (Germany) F Moser | 4 | 7^{7} | [8]
(Belgium) D Norman (Germany) A Waske | 6 | 1 | [8]
2 | (Germany) D Brown (Australia) P Hanley | 3 | 6 | [10]

Final
1 | (Czech Republic) F Čermák (Austria) J Knowle | 7^{7} | 3 | [12]
2 | (Germany) D Brown (Australia) P Hanley | 6^{4} | 6 | [10]
