= 2016 Open Sud de France =

- Date: 1–7 February 2016
- Edition: 29th
- Category: World Tour 250
- Draw: 28S / 16D
- Prize money: €520,070
- Surface: Hard (indoor)
- Location: Montpellier, France

Champions

Singles
- (France) Richard Gasquet

Doubles
- (Croatia) Mate Pavić / (New Zealand) Michael Venus
← 2015 ·	Open Sud de France	· 2017 →

The 2016 Open Sud de France was a men's tennis tournament played on indoor hard courts. It was the 29th edition of the Open Sud de France, and part of the ATP World Tour 250 series of the 2016 ATP World Tour. It took place at the Arena Montpellier in Montpellier, France, from 1 February to 7 February 2016. First-seeded Richard Gasquet won the singles title.

== Highlights ==
Croatia's Ivan Dodig, Spain's Tommy Robredo, Poland's Jerzy Janowicz, and Russia's Andrey Kuznetsov withdrew from the tournament.

They were replaced by Ruben Bemelmans, Michael Berrer, Lukáš Lacko, and Jan-Lennard Struff, respectively.

Gael Monfils, the outgoing semifinalist and two-time tournament winner, was defeated in the first round by his compatriot Édouard Roger-Vasselin with scores of 4-6, 6-7. Similarly, Gilles Simon, the third seed who was exempt from the first round, was eliminated by qualifier Dustin Brown with scores of 4-6, 4-6.

Richard Gasquet successfully defended his title by defeating Paul-Henri Mathieu with scores of 7-5, 6-4. This victory marked his 13th career title and his third in Montpellier.

Mate Pavić and Michael Venus claimed the doubles title with a 7-5, 7-6(4) victory over Alexander and Mischa Zverev. This was their third title together and their second of the season.

== Finals ==
=== Singles ===
- (France) Richard Gasquet defeated (France) Paul-Henri Mathieu 7–5, 6–4

=== Doubles ===
- (Croatia) Mate Pavić / (New Zealand) Michael Venus defeated (Germany) Alexander Zverev / (Germany) Mischa Zverev 7–5, 7–6^{(7–4)}

== Points and prize money ==
=== Point distribution ===
Event	W	F	SF	QF	Round of 16	Round of 32	Q	Q2	Q1
Singles	250	150	90	45	20	0	12	6	0
Doubles	250	150	90	45	0	—	—	—	—

=== Prize money ===
Event	W	F	SF	QF	Round of 16	Round of 32	Q2	Q1
Singles	€82,450	€43,430	€23,525	€13,400	€7,900	€4,680	€2,105	€1,055
Doubles	€25,070	€13,170	€7,140	€4,080	€2,390	—	—	—
Doubles prize money per team

== Singles main draw entrants ==
=== Seeds ===
Country	Player	Rank^{1}	Seed
FRA	Richard Gasquet	9	1
CRO	Marin Čilić	13	2
FRA	Gilles Simon	15	3
FRA	Benoît Paire	18	4
FRA	Gaël Monfils	24	5
POR	João Sousa	33	6
CRO	Borna Ćorić	40	7
CYP	Marcos Baghdatis	46	8

- Rankings were as of January 18, 2015.

=== Other entrants ===
The following players received wildcards into the singles main draw:

- (Cyprus) Marcos Baghdatis
- (France) Julien Benneteau
- (France) Quentin Halys

The following players received entry from the qualifying draw:

- (Germany) Dustin Brown
- (France) Kenny de Schepper
- (France) Édouard Roger-Vasselin
- (Sweden) Elias Ymer

=== Withdrawals ===
Before the tournament

- (Croatia) Ivan Dodig →replaced by (Italy) Luca Vanni
- (Poland) Jerzy Janowicz →replaced by (Germany) Jan-Lennard Struff
- (Russia) Andrey Kuznetsov →replaced by (Georgia (country)) Nikoloz Basilashvili
- (Spain) Tommy Robredo →replaced by (Belgium) Ruben Bemelmans

== Doubles main draw entrants ==
=== Seeds ===
Country	Player	Country	Player	Rank^{1}	Seed
POL	Łukasz Kubot	POL	Marcin Matkowski	44	1
CRO	Mate Pavić	NZL	Michael Venus	89	2
AUT	Oliver Marach	FRA	Fabrice Martin	99	3
ISR	Jonathan Erlich	GBR	Colin Fleming	106	4

- Rankings were as of January 18, 2016.

=== Other entrants ===
The following pairs received wildcards into the doubles main draw:

- (France) Paul-Henri Mathieu / (France) Vincent Millot
- (Germany) Alexander Zverev / (Germany) Mischa Zverev

=== Withdrawals ===
During the tournament

- (Israel) Jonathan Erlich (lower body pain)
