= Lambertz Open by STAWAG =

Indoor tennis tournament held in Aachen, North Rhine-Westphalia, since 1991

Defunct tennis tournament
- Location: Aachen, Germany
- Venue: Grün Weiss Aachen
- Category: ATP Challenger Series
- Surface: Carpet / Indoors
- Draw: 32S/32Q/16D
- Prize money: €42,500

The Lambertz Open by STAWAG was a tennis tournament held in Aachen, Germany between 1991 and 2010. The event was part of the ATP Challenger Series and was played on indoor carpet courts.

== Past finals ==
=== Singles ===
Year	Champion	Runner-up	Score
2010	(Germany) Dustin Brown	(Netherlands) Igor Sijsling	6–3, 7–6(3)
2009	(United States) Rajeev Ram	(Jamaica) Dustin Brown	7–6(2), 6–7(5), 7–6(2)
2008	(Russia) Evgeny Korolev	(Belgium) Ruben Bemelmans	7–6, 7–6
2007	(Russia) Evgeny Korolev	(Germany) Andreas Beck	6–4, 6–4
2006	(Germany) Rainer Schüttler	(Russia) Evgeny Korolev	6–3, 7–5
2005	(Russia) Evgeny Korolev	(Netherlands) Raemon Sluiter	6–3, 7–6
2004	(Serbia and Montenegro) Novak Djokovic	(Germany) Lars Burgsmüller	6–4, 3–6, 6–4
2003	(Austria) Alexander Peya	(Austria) Jürgen Melzer	7–6, 6–1
2002	(Belarus) Vladimir Voltchkov	(Switzerland) Marc Rosset	7–6, 6–4
2001	(Germany) Alexander Popp	(Germany) Axel Pretzsch	6–3, 1–6, 6–2
2000	(Germany) Rainer Schüttler	(Sweden) Johan Settergren	7–6, 1–6, 6–1
1999	(Netherlands) Raemon Sluiter	(Germany) David Prinosil	2–6, 6–4, 7–6
1998	(Germany) Hendrik Dreekmann	(Bulgaria) Orlin Stanoytchev	7–6, 6–4
1997	(Germany) Hendrik Dreekmann	(Czech Republic) Jiří Novák	5–7, 7–6, 6–3
1996	(Russia) Alexander Volkov	(Germany) David Prinosil	6–3, 7–6
1995	(Germany) Jörn Renzenbrink	(Czech Republic) Martin Damm	5–7, 6–3, 6–4
1994	(Netherlands) Jan Siemerink	(Germany) David Prinosil	5–7, 7–6, 6–4
1993	(Sweden) Jonas Björkman	(Sweden) Jan Apell	6–3, 3–6, 7–5
1992	(Czechoslovakia) Martin Damm	(New Zealand) Brett Steven	6–4, 7–6
1991	(Germany) Alexander Mronz	(Czechoslovakia) Martin Střelba	6–4, 6–3

=== Doubles ===
Year	Champion	Runner–up	Score
2010	(Belgium) Ruben Bemelmans (Netherlands) Igor Sijsling	(United Kingdom) Jamie Delgado (United Kingdom) Jonathan Marray	6–4, 3–6, [11–9]
2009	(India) Rohan Bopanna (Pakistan) Aisam-ul-Haq Qureshi	(Germany) Philipp Marx (Slovakia) Igor Zelenay	6–4, 7–6(6)
2008	(Germany) Michael Kohlmann (Germany) Alexander Waske	(United States) Travis Parrott (Slovakia) Filip Polášek	6–4, 6–4
2007	(Germany) Philipp Petzschner (Austria) Alexander Peya	(Germany) Dominik Meffert (Germany) Mischa Zverev	6–3, 6–2
2006	(Latvia) Ernests Gulbis (Germany) Mischa Zverev	(Poland) Tomasz Bednarek (Georgia (country)) Irakli Labadze	6–7, 6–4, [10–8]
2005	(United Kingdom) James Auckland (United Kingdom) Jamie Delgado	(Germany) Lars Burgsmüller (Germany) Michael Kohlmann	2–6, 7–5, 6–3
2004	(Sweden) Simon Aspelin (Australia) Todd Perry	(Czech Republic) Petr Luxa (Czech Republic) Petr Pála	6–3, 6–3
2003	(Poland) Mariusz Fyrstenberg (Poland) Marcin Matkowski	(Australia) Todd Perry (Japan) Thomas Shimada	7–6, 7–6
2002	(United States) Jim Thomas (Belgium) Tom Vanhoudt	(Japan) Thomas Shimada (Japan) Takao Suzuki	6–7, 7–6, 6–3
2001	(Austria) Julian Knowle (Germany) Michael Kohlmann	(Germany) Marc-Kevin Goellner (South Africa) Marcos Ondruska	6–3, 7–6
2000	(Netherlands) Sander Groen (Netherlands) Jan Siemerink	(Germany) Michael Kohlmann (Germany) Franz Stauder	6–7, 7–6, 6–3
1999	(Germany) Lars Burgsmüller (Japan) Takao Suzuki	(Spain) Juan-Ignacio Carrasco (Spain) Jairo Velasco, Jr.	7–6, 6–4
1998	(Netherlands) Menno Oosting (Czech Republic) Pavel Vízner	(Finland) Tuomas Ketola (Czech Republic) Petr Pála	7–6, 6–3
1997	(South Africa) John-Laffnie de Jager (South Africa) Chris Haggard	(United States) Dave Randall (United States) Jack Waite	3–6, 6–1, 7–6
1996	(South Africa) Robbie Koenig (Uzbekistan) Oleg Ogorodov	(United States) Dave Randall (United States) Chris Woodruff	6–4, 3–6, 6–3
1995	(Sweden) David Ekerot (Hungary) László Markovits	(Germany) Alexander Mronz (Germany) Lars Rehmann	6–7, 6–4, 7–6
1994	(Sweden) David Engel (Sweden) Ola Kristiansson	(Australia) Wayne Arthurs (Australia) Brent Larkham	6–4, 6–4
1993	(Sweden) Jan Apell (Sweden) Jonas Björkman	(United States) Mike Briggs (United States) Trevor Kronemann	7–5, 7–6
1992	(South Africa) Grant Stafford (South Africa) Christo van Rensburg	(Denmark) Michael Mortensen (Germany) Christian Saceanu	6–1, 6–3
1991	(United States) Mark Keil (South Africa) Byron Talbot	(Sweden) Jan Gunnarsson (Sweden) Magnus Larsson	6–3, 3–6, 6–3
