= Igor Sijsling =

Dutch tennis player

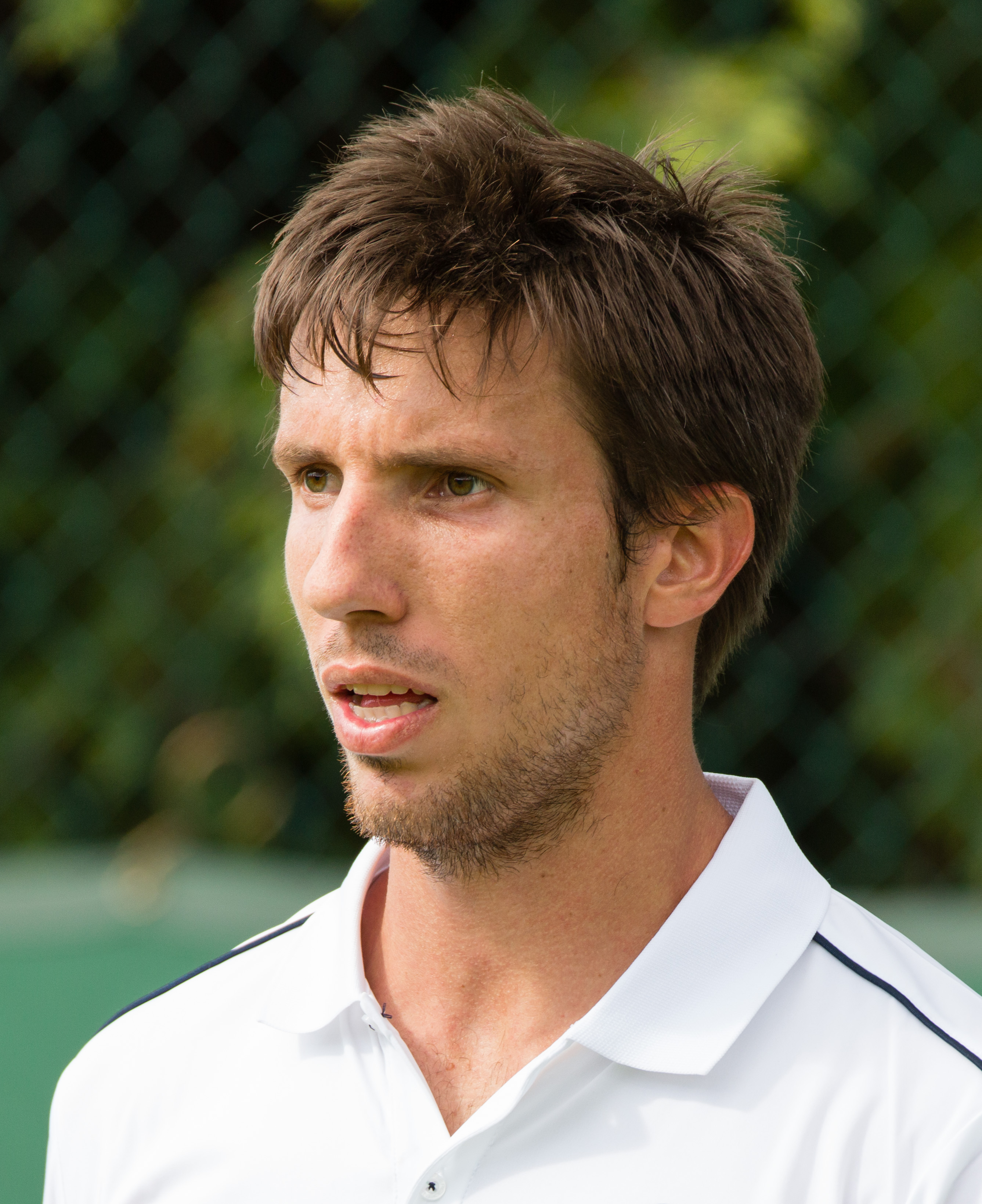
- Sijsling at the 2015 Wimbledon qualifying tournament
- Country (sports): Netherlands
- Residence: Amsterdam, Netherlands
- Born: 18 August 1987 (age 38) Amsterdam, Netherlands
- Height: 1.90 m (6 ft 3 in)
- Turned pro: 2006
- Plays: Right-handed (one-handed backhand)
- Coach: Dennis Schenk
- Prize money: $2,225,903

Singles
- Career record: 50–90
- Career titles: 0
- Highest ranking: No. 52 (17 February 2014)

Grand Slam singles results
- Australian Open: 1R (2013, 2014, 2015)
- French Open: 2R (2013, 2016)
- Wimbledon: 3R (2013)
- US Open: 2R (2012)

Doubles
- Career record: 27–44
- Career titles: 1
- Highest ranking: No. 37 (6 January 2014)

Grand Slam doubles results
- Australian Open: F (2013)
- French Open: 2R (2014)
- Wimbledon: 2R (2014)
- US Open: 2R (2014)

Igor Sijsling (Dutch pronunciation: [ˈiɡɔr ˈsɛislɪŋ]; born 18 August 1987) is an inactive Dutch professional tennis player. Sijsling reached his career-high ATP singles ranking of World No. 52 on 17 February 2014. His biggest accomplishment is reaching the final of Australian Open Doubles with countryman Robin Haase in 2013, where they lost to the Bryan brothers. In singles, he reached the third round of the 2013 Wimbledon Championships and has victories over top players including Jo-Wilfried Tsonga, Milos Raonic and Mikhail Youzhny. He has also coached Tim van Rijthoven.

== Personal life ==
Sijsling grew up in Amsterdam, where his Serbian mother tried to instill her love of sports in her son. He played all kinds of sports as a young child, street football, basketball, and tennis. He even studied ballet.

He started playing tennis at the age of five with his parents, studying at the Amstelpark tennis school. By the time he was 12, tennis was clearly his sport. He was chosen for the Dutch national youth team. He won the Dutch under-18 championship twice and was runner-up at the European under-18 championships in Switzerland.

He received his diploma from the Vossius Gymnasium and began to play on the Futures and Challenger tours in 2006.

He was coached by Dennis Schenk.

== Professional career ==
=== 2012 ===
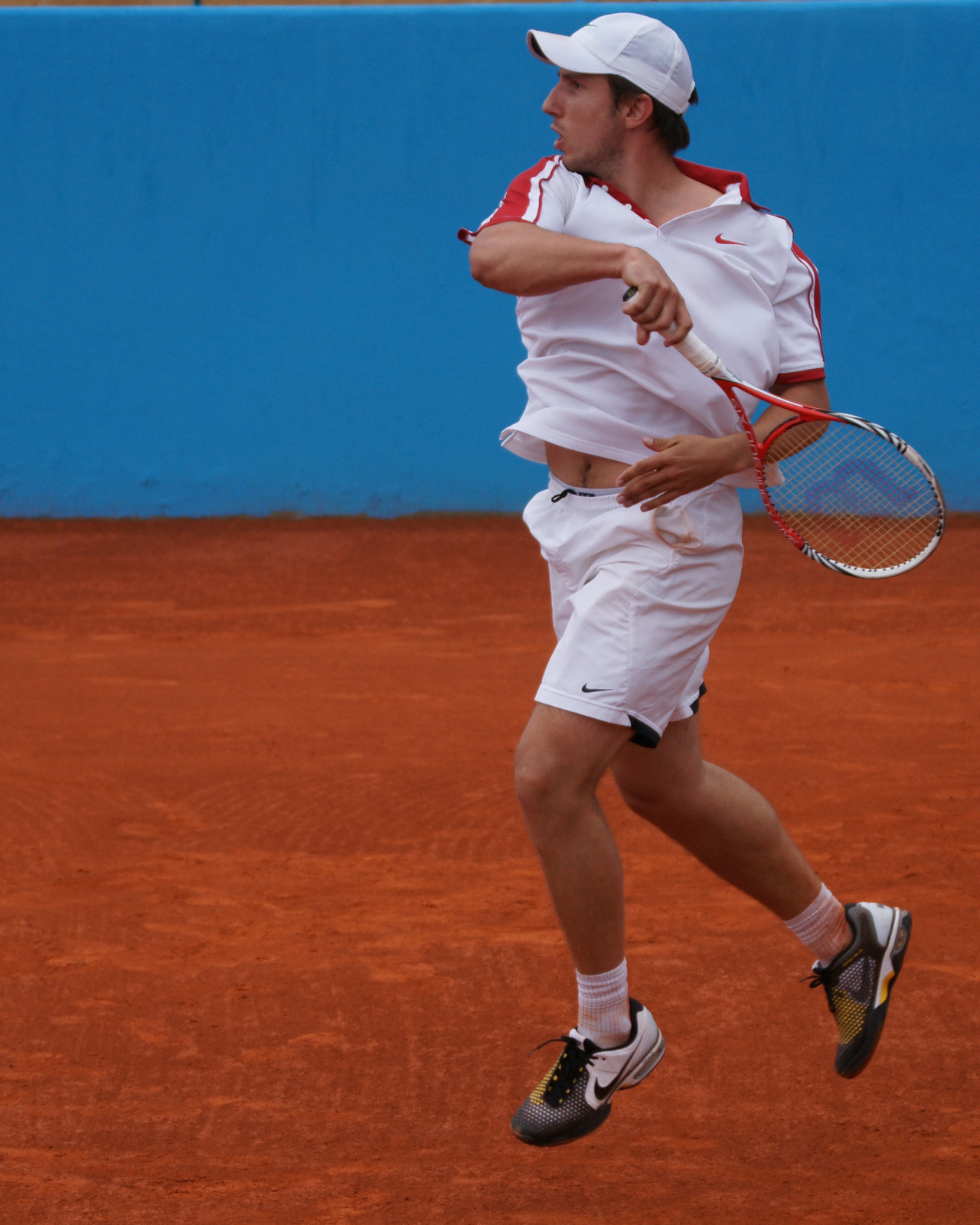
Igor Sijsling at the Nice Open 2012.

Sijsling's first success on the ATP tour came in 2011, when he reached the quarterfinals in Metz, losing to Ivan Ljubičić.

In 2012, he again reached the quarterfinals in s-Hertogenbosch, after beating Jarkko Nieminen and Olivier Rochus in the first two rounds. He was beaten by David Ferrer. He qualified for the US Open that year and reached the second round of the main draw, where he again lost to Ferrer. In Kuala Lumpur, he again reached the quarterfinals, falling yet again to Ferrer. He reached the second round in Moscow and Paris-Bercy, falling to Andreas Seppi and Janko Tipsarević, respectively. In doubles, he reached the quarterfinals in Rotterdam, partnering Thomas Schoorel. He also reached the quarterfinals in Moscow, partnered with Roberto Bautista Agut.

=== 2013 ===
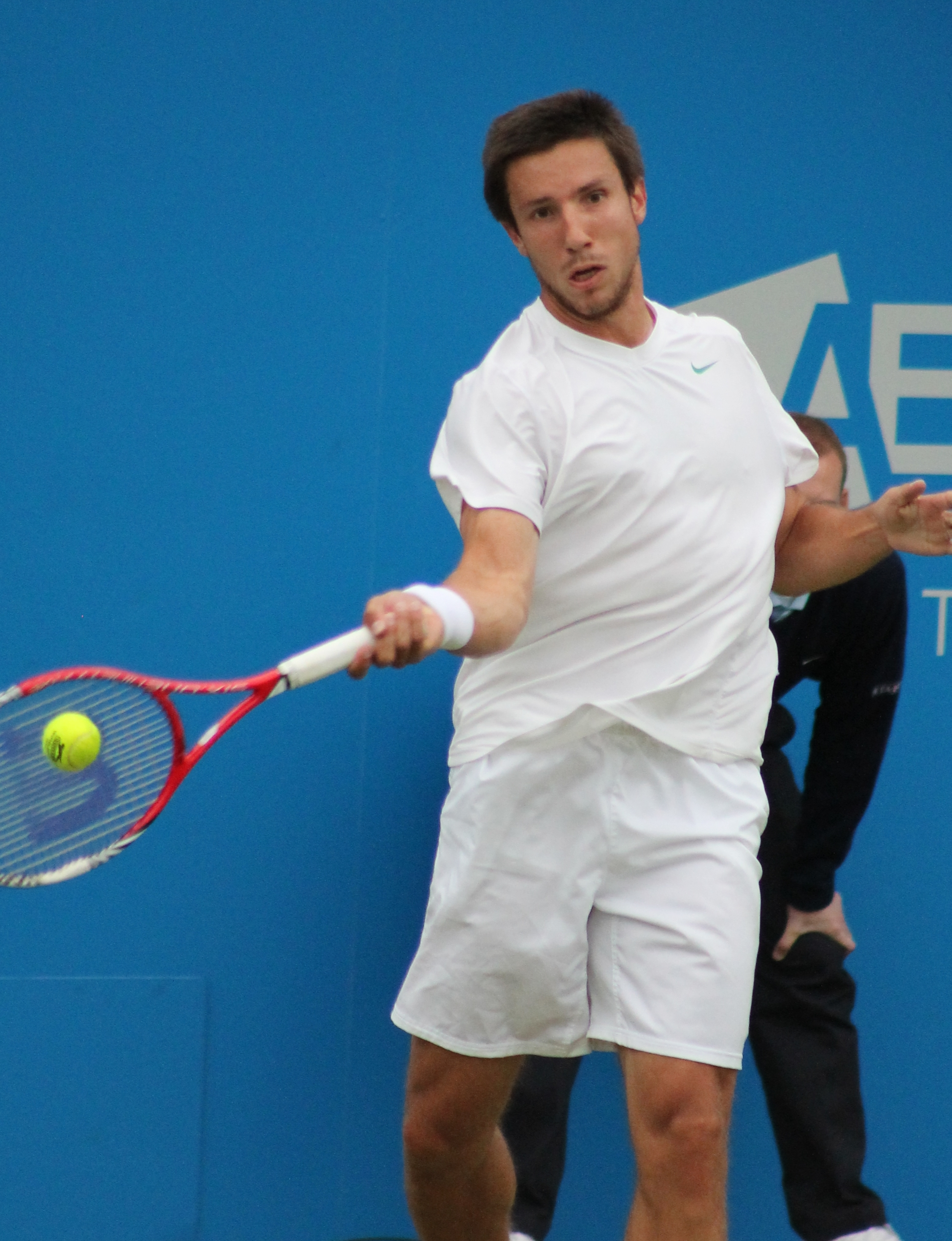
Igor Sijsling in 2013.

In 2013, he qualified in Auckland and beat Dutch no. 1 Robin Haase in the first round, only to fall to Tommy Haas in the second. He also reached the second round in Zagreb. At the Australian Open, he teamed with Robin Haase to reach the doubles final, losing to the Bryan brothers. In Rotterdam, Sijsling beat Jo-Wilfried Tsonga in the first round for his first top-10 victory. At Wimbledon, Sijsling had his best showing in the singles tournament of a Grand Slam event by reaching the third round, beating seeded player Grigor Dimitrov in the process.

=== 2014 ===
Igor prepared for the first Grand Slam tournament of the season with two warm-up tournaments, in Brisbane, where he lost in the first round to Nicolas Mahut, followed by the Heineken Open, where he again lost in the first round, this time to eventual finalist Lu Yen-hsun. At the Australian Open, he lost to Australian wildcard Thanasi Kokkinakis in the first round. The following week he played in a Challenger event in Heilbronn, where he made the final, losing to home favourite Peter Gojowczyk in straight sets. In Zagreb he entered the tournament as the eighth seed. He beat Kavčič in the first round, but lost to Russian qualifier Andrey Kuznetsov in the second.

Sijsling played his first ATP World Tour 500 series event of the year as a wildcard in Rotterdam, beating seventh seed and world no. 15 Mikhail Youzhny in the first round, losing just four games in the process. He defeated qualifier Michael Berrer and Philipp Kohlschreiber to reach the semifinals.

== Career finals ==
=== Grand Slam finals ===
==== Doubles: 1 (0–1) ====
Outcome	Year	Championship	Surface	Partner	Opponents	Score
Runner-up	2013	Australian Open	Hard	(Netherlands) Robin Haase	(United States) Bob Bryan (United States) Mike Bryan	3–6, 4–6

=== ATP Tour finals ===
==== Doubles: 4 (1–3) ====
Legend Grand Slam tournaments (0–1) ATP World Tour Finals (0–0) ATP World Tour Masters 1000 (0–0) ATP World Tour 500 Series (0–0) ATP World Tour 250 Series (1–2)	Titles by surface Hard (1–2) Clay (0–1) Grass (0–0)	Titles by setting Outdoor (1–3) Indoor (0–0)

Result	W–L	Date	Tournament	Tier	Surface	Partner	Opponents	Score
Loss	0–1	Jul 2008	Dutch Open, Netherlands	International	Clay	(Netherlands) Jesse Huta Galung	(Czech Republic) František Čermák (Netherlands) Rogier Wassen	5–7, 5–7
Loss	0–2	Jan 2013	Australian Open, Australia	Grand Slam	Hard	(Netherlands) Robin Haase	(United States) Bob Bryan (United States) Mike Bryan	3–6, 4–6
Loss	0–3	Jul 2013	Colombia Open, Colombia	250 Series	Hard	(France) Édouard Roger-Vasselin	(India) Purav Raja (India) Divij Sharan	6–7^{(4–7)}, 6–7^{(3–7)}
Win	1–3	Jul 2013	Atlanta Open, US	250 Series	Hard	(France) Édouard Roger-Vasselin	(United Kingdom) Colin Fleming (United Kingdom) Jonathan Marray	7–6^{(8–6)}, 6–3

== ATP Challenger and ITF Futures finals ==
=== Singles: 38 (20–18) ===
Legend (singles) ATP Challenger Tour (7–10) ITF Futures Tour (13–8)	Finals by surface Hard (10–14) Clay (5–2) Grass (0–1) Carpet (5–1)

Result	W–L	Date	Tournament	Tier	Surface	Opponent	Score
Win	1–0	Jul 2006	Netherlands F3, Heerhugowaard	Futures	Clay	(Belgium) Stefan Wauters	7–6^{(7–2)}, 6–3
Win	2–0	Jul 2006	Belgium F2, Sint-Katelijne-Waver	Futures	Clay	(Belgium) Stefan Wauters	6–4, 6–4
Win	3–0	Aug 2006	Saransk, Russia	Challenger	Clay	(Uzbekistan) Farrukh Dustov	7–6^{(10–8)}, 6–4
Loss	3–1	Apr 2007	Italy F10, Cremona	Futures	Hard	(Spain) Gabriel Trujillo Soler	2–6, 3–6
Loss	3–2	Nov 2007	Shrewsbury, United Kingdom	Challenger	Hard	(Russia) Igor Kunitsyn	2–6, 4–6
Win	4–2	Nov 2008	USA F29, Honolulu	Futures	Hard	(South Korea) Daniel Yoo	6–3, 7–6^{(7–3)}
Win	5–2	Nov 2008	Dominican Republic F2, Santo Domingo	Futures	Hard	(Russia) Andrey Kumantsov	7–6^{(7–5)}, 4–6, 6–1
Loss	5–3	May 2009	Italy F8, Vicenza	Futures	Clay	(Italy) Francesco Aldi	3–6, 6–4, 4–6
Loss	5–4	Jul 2009	Manchester, United Kingdom	Challenger	Grass	(Belgium) Olivier Rochus	3–6, 6–4, 2–6
Loss	5–5	Nov 2009	Chuncheon, South Korea	Challenger	Hard	(Taiwan) Lu Yen-hsun	2–6, 3–6
Loss	5–6	Mar 2010	Great Britain F4, Bath	Futures	Hard	(Slovakia) Andrej Martin	6–2, 2–6, 6–7^{(4–7)}
Win	6–6	Jun 2010	Norway F1, Gausdal	Futures	Hard	(Italy) Riccardo Ghedin	7–5, ret.
Win	7–6	Nov 2010	Eckental, Germany	Challenger	Carpet	(Belgium) Ruben Bemelmans	3–6, 6–2, 6–3
Loss	7–7	Nov 2010	Aachen, Germany	Challenger	Carpet	(Germany) Dustin Brown	3–6, 6–7^{(3–7)}
Win	8–7	Sep 2011	Alphen, Netherlands	Challenger	Clay	(Germany) Jan-Lennard Struff	7–6^{(7–2)}, 6–3
Win	9–7	Feb 2012	Quimper, France	Challenger	Hard	(Tunisia) Malek Jaziri	6–3, 6–4
Win	10–7	Feb 2012	Wolfsburg, Germany	Challenger	Carpet	(Poland) Jerzy Janowicz	4–6, 6–3, 7–6^{(11–9)}
Loss	10–8	Jul 2012	Granby, Canada	Challenger	Hard	(Canada) Vasek Pospisil	6–7^{(2–7)}, 4–6
Win	11–8	Aug 2012	Vancouver, Canada	Challenger	Hard	(Ukraine) Sergey Bubka	6–1, 7–5
Loss	11–9	Oct 2013	Mons, Belgium	Challenger	Hard	(Czech Republic) Radek Štěpánek	3–6, 5–7
Loss	11–10	Jan 2014	Heilbronn, Germany	Challenger	Hard	(Germany) Peter Gojowczyk	4–6, 5–7
Loss	11–11	Sep 2015	Alphen, Netherlands	Challenger	Clay	(Bosnia and Herzegovina) Damir Džumhur	1–6, 6–2, 1–6
Loss	11–12	Oct 2015	Rennes, France	Challenger	Hard	(Tunisia) Malek Jaziri	7–5, 5–7, 4–6
Win	12–12	Nov 2015	Brescia, Italy	Challenger	Hard	(Bosnia and Herzegovina) Mirza Bašić	6–4, 6–4
Loss	12–13	Apr 2016	Saint Brieuc, France	Challenger	Hard	(France) Alexandre Sidorenko	6–2, 3–6, 6–7^{(3–7)}
Loss	12–14	Sep 2017	France F20, Plaisir	Futures	Hard	(France) Antoine Hoang	6–4, 3–6, 4–6
Win	13–14	Feb 2018	Germany F3, Kaarst	Futures	Carpet	(Germany) Marvin Moeller	6–2, 7–6^{(7–2)}
Win	14–14	Mar 2018	France F4, Toulouse	Futures	Hard	(Netherlands) Botic Van de Zandschulp	6–3, ret.
Loss	14–15	Mar 2018	France F5, Poitiers	Futures	Hard	(France) Antoine Hoang	6–3, 1–6, 4–6
Win	15–15	Feb 2019	M15 Kaarst, Germany	World Tennis Tour	Carpet	(Netherlands) Botic Van de Zandschulp	6–1, 6–4
Win	16–15	Mar 2019	M15 Sharm El Sheikh, Egypt	World Tennis Tour	Hard	(Brazil) Gilbert Klier Junior	6–2, 3–6, 6–1
Loss	16–16	Apr 2019	M25 Bolton, United Kingdom	World Tennis Tour	Hard	(Netherlands) Botic Van de Zandschulp	6–7^{(2–7)}, 7–6^{(8–6)}, 5–7
Win	17–16	Aug 2019	M25 Dublin, Ireland	World Tennis Tour	Carpet	(United Kingdom) Ryan Peniston	6–4, 7–6^{(10–8)}
Loss	17–17	Aug 2019	M25 Chiswick, United Kingdom	World Tennis Tour	Hard	(United Kingdom) Jack Draper	4–6, 6–2, 3–6
Loss	17–18	Mar 2020	M25 Sunderland, United Kingdom	World Tennis Tour	Hard	(United Kingdom) Jack Draper	2–6, 0–6
Win	18–18	Aug 2020	M15 Alkmaar, Netherlands	World Tennis Tour	Clay	(Italy) Jacopo Berrettini	6–2, 6–1
Win	19–18	Sep 2020	M25+H Plaisir, France	World Tennis Tour	Hard	(France) Johan Sebastien Tatlot	7–6^{(7–5)}, 3–6, 7–6^{(7–4)}
Win	20–18	Oct 2020	M25+H Rodez, France	World Tennis Tour	Hard	(Netherlands) Jelle Sels	6–3, 6–3

=== Doubles: 24 (11–13) ===
Legend (doubles) ATP Challenger Tour (4–3) ITF Futures Tour (7–10)	Finals by surface Hard (5–7) Clay (4–6) Grass (0–0) Carpet (2–0)

Result	W–L	Date	Tournament	Tier	Surface	Partner	Opponents	Score
Win	1–0	Aug 2005	Italy F24, L'Aquila	Futures	Clay	(Netherlands) Robin Haase	(Switzerland) Frederic Nussbaum (Switzerland) B.-David Rufer	6–4, 7–6^{(10–8)}
Loss	1–1	Sep 2005	Netherlands F4, Enschede	Futures	Clay	(Netherlands) Jesse Huta Galung	(Germany) Ralph Grambow (Germany) Sascha Kloer	walkover
Loss	1–2	Nov 2005	Israel F1, Ashkelon	Futures	Hard	(Netherlands) Robin Haase	(Czech Republic) Roman Vögeli (Czech Republic) Michal Navrátil	6–7^{(2–7)}, 6–3, 2–6
Loss	1–3	Feb 2006	Croatia F2, Zagreb	Futures	Hard	(Netherlands) Robin Haase	(Croatia) Petar Jelenić (Croatia) Vilim Visak	4–6, 6–4, 6–7^{(2–7)}
Win	2–3	May 2006	Spain F14, Lleida	Futures	Clay	(Netherlands) Antal van der Duim	(Spain) C. Rexach-Itoiz (Spain) H. Ruiz-Cadenas	6–2, 7–6^{(7–2)}
Loss	2–4	Sep 2006	Netherlands F7, Almere	Futures	Clay	(Netherlands) Jesse Huta Galung	(Netherlands) Thiemo de Bakker (Netherlands) A. Van Der Duim	6–4, 1–6, 4–6
Win	3–4	Nov 2006	Louisville, United States	Challenger	Hard	(Netherlands) Robin Haase	(United States) Amer Delić (United States) Robert Kendrick	walkover
Win	4–4	Apr 2007	Italy F10, Cremona	Futures	Hard	(Croatia) Ivan Cerović	(Argentina) Alejandro Fabbri (Spain) Gabriel Trujillo Soler	7–6^{(7–3)}, 6–4
Loss	4–5	May 2007	Italy F15, Parma	Futures	Clay	(Netherlands) Thiemo de Bakker	(Italy) Alberto Brizzi (Italy) Giancarlo Petrazzuolo	6–1, 4–6, 3–6
Loss	4–6	Aug 2007	Vigo, Spain	Challenger	Clay	(Spain) Pablo Santos	(Italy) Leonardo Azzaro (Algeria) Lamine Ouahab	6–2, 4–6, [7–10]
Win	5–6	Aug 2007	Netherlands F4, Vlaardingen	Futures	Clay	(Netherlands) Thiemo de Bakker	(Netherlands) D. Spierenburg (Netherlands) S. Wijdenbosch	6–4, 7–6^{(8–6)}
Loss	5–7	Oct 2007	France F18, La Roche-sur-Yon	Futures	Hard	(Croatia) Vladimir Obradović	(Australia) Raphael Durek (Czech Republic) Lukáš Rosol	3–6, 2–6
Loss	5–8	Nov 2008	USA F29, Honolulu	Futures	Hard	(Australia) Matt Reid	(United States) James Ludlow (Sweden) Andreas Siljeström	0–6, 6–4, [4–10]
Loss	5–9	May 2009	Italy F8, Vicenza	Futures	Clay	(Netherlands) Nick van der Meer	(Slovenia) Andrej Kračman (Argentina) Guillermo Carry	1–6, 6–7^{(1–7)}
Loss	5–10	Apr 2010	Athens, Greece	Challenger	Hard	(Netherlands) Robin Haase	(South Africa) Rik de Voest (Chinese Taipei) Lu Yen-hsun	3–6, 4–6
Win	6–10	Nov 2010	Aachen, Germany	Challenger	Carpet	(Belgium) Ruben Bemelmans	(United Kingdom) Jamie Delgado (United Kingdom) Jonathan Marray	6–4, 3–6, [11–9]
Loss	6–11	Sep 2011	Alphen, Netherlands	Challenger	Clay	(Netherlands) Matwé Middelkoop	(Netherlands) Thiemo de Bakker (Netherlands) A. van der Duim	4–6, 7–6^{(7–4)}, [6–10]
Win	7–11	Oct 2013	Mons, Belgium	Challenger	Hard	(Netherlands) Jesse Huta Galung	(United States) Eric Butorac (South Africa) Raven Klaasen	4–6, 7–6^{(7–2)}, [10–7]
Loss	7–12	Mar 2018	France F4, Toulouse	Futures	Hard	(Netherlands) Botic Van de Zandschulp	(France) Dan Added (France) Albano Olivetti	3–6, 5–7
Win	8–12	Feb 2019	M15 Kaarst, Germany	World Tennis Tour	Carpet	(Netherlands) Botic Van de Zandschulp	(Germany) Mats Rosenkranz (United Kingdom) Mark Whitehouse	6–4, 6–4
Win	9–12	Mar 2019	M15 Sharm El Sheikh, Egypt	World Tennis Tour	Hard	(Netherlands) Botic Van de Zandschulp	(India) S D Prajwal Dev (India) Adil Kalyanpur	7–6^{(10–8)}, 2–6, [10–6]
Win	10–12	May 2019	M25 Prijedor, Bosnia & Herzegovina	World Tennis Tour	Clay	(Netherlands) Botic Van de Zandschulp	(Montenegro) Ljubomir Čelebić (Bosnia and Herzegovina) Nerman Fatić	3–6, 6–3, [10–4]
Loss	10–13	Oct 2020	M25+H Rodez, France	World Tennis Tour	Hard	(Netherlands) Glenn Smits	(France) Sadio Doumbia (France) Fabien Rebul	3–6, 5–7
Win	11–13	Jul 2021	Pozoblanco, Spain	Challenger	Hard	(Netherlands) Tim van Rijthoven	(Ecuador) Diego Hidalgo (Spain) Sergio Martos Gornés	5–7, 7–6^{(7–4)}, [10–5]
Win	12–13	Apr 2023	M15 Singapore	World Tennis Tour	Hard	(Indonesia) Justin Barki	(Philippines) Francis Alcantara (China) Sun Fajing	6–1, 6–1

== Performance timelines ==
Key
W	F	SF	QF	#R	RR	Q#	DNQ	A	NH

(W) winner; (F) finalist; (SF) semifinalist; (QF) quarterfinalist; (#R) rounds 4, 3, 2, 1; (RR) round-robin stage; (Q#) qualification round; (DNQ) did not qualify; (A) absent; (NH) not held; (SR) strike rate (events won / competed); (W–L) win–loss record.
To avoid confusion and double counting, these charts are updated at the conclusion of a tournament or when the player's participation has ended.

=== Singles ===
Tournament	2009	2010	2011	2012	2013	2014	2015	2016	2017	2018	2019	2020	2021	SR	W–L	Win%
Grand Slam tournaments
Australian Open	A	Q2	Q1	Q3	1R	1R	1R	Q2	A	A	A	A	A	0 / 3	0–3	0%
French Open	A	Q1	Q1	1R	2R	1R	1R	2R	Q1	A	A	A	A	0 / 5	2–5	29%
Wimbledon	A	A	1R	A	3R	1R	1R	1R	A	A	A	NH	A	0 / 4	2–4	33%
US Open	Q2	Q3	Q2	2R	1R	1R	Q1	A	Q1	A	A	A		0 / 3	1–3	25%
Win–loss	0–0	0–0	0–1	1–2	3–4	0–4	0–3	1–2	0–0	0–0	0–0	0–0	0–0	0 / 16	5–16	24%
ATP World Tour Masters 1000
Indian Wells Masters	A	A	A	A	1R	1R	2R	A	A	A	A	NH	A	0 / 3	1–3	25%
Miami Open	A	A	Q1	A	2R	1R	A	A	A	A	A	A	A	0 / 2	1–2	33%
Monte-Carlo Masters	A	A	A	A	A	1R	A	A	A	A	A	NH	A	0 / 1	0–1	0%
Madrid Open	A	A	A	A	Q1	2R	A	A	A	A	A	NH	A	0 / 1	1–1	50%
Italian Open	A	A	A	A	A	2R	A	A	A	A	A	A	A	0 / 1	1–1	50%
Cincinnati Masters	A	A	A	Q1	A	A	A	A	A	A	A	A	A	0 / 0	0–0	–
Paris Masters	A	A	A	2R	1R	Q2	A	A	A	A	A	NH		0 / 2	1–2	33%
Win–loss	0–0	0–0	0–0	1–1	1–3	2–5	1–1	0–0	0–0	0–0	0–0	0–0	0–0	0 / 10	5–10	33%

=== Doubles ===
Tournament	2010	2011	2012	2013	2014	2015	2016	SR	W–L	Win %
Grand Slam tournaments
Australian Open	A	A	A	F	1R	1R	A	0 / 3	5–3	63%
French Open	A	A	A	1R	2R	A	A	0 / 2	1–2	33%
Wimbledon	A	A	A	1R	2R	A	Q1	0 / 2	1–2	33%
US Open	A	A	1R	1R	2R	A	A	0 / 3	1–3	25%
Win–loss	0–0	0–0	0–1	5–4	2–3	0–1	0–0	0 / 10	8–10	44%
