= Dustin Brown (tennis) =

Jamaican-German tennis player (born 1984)

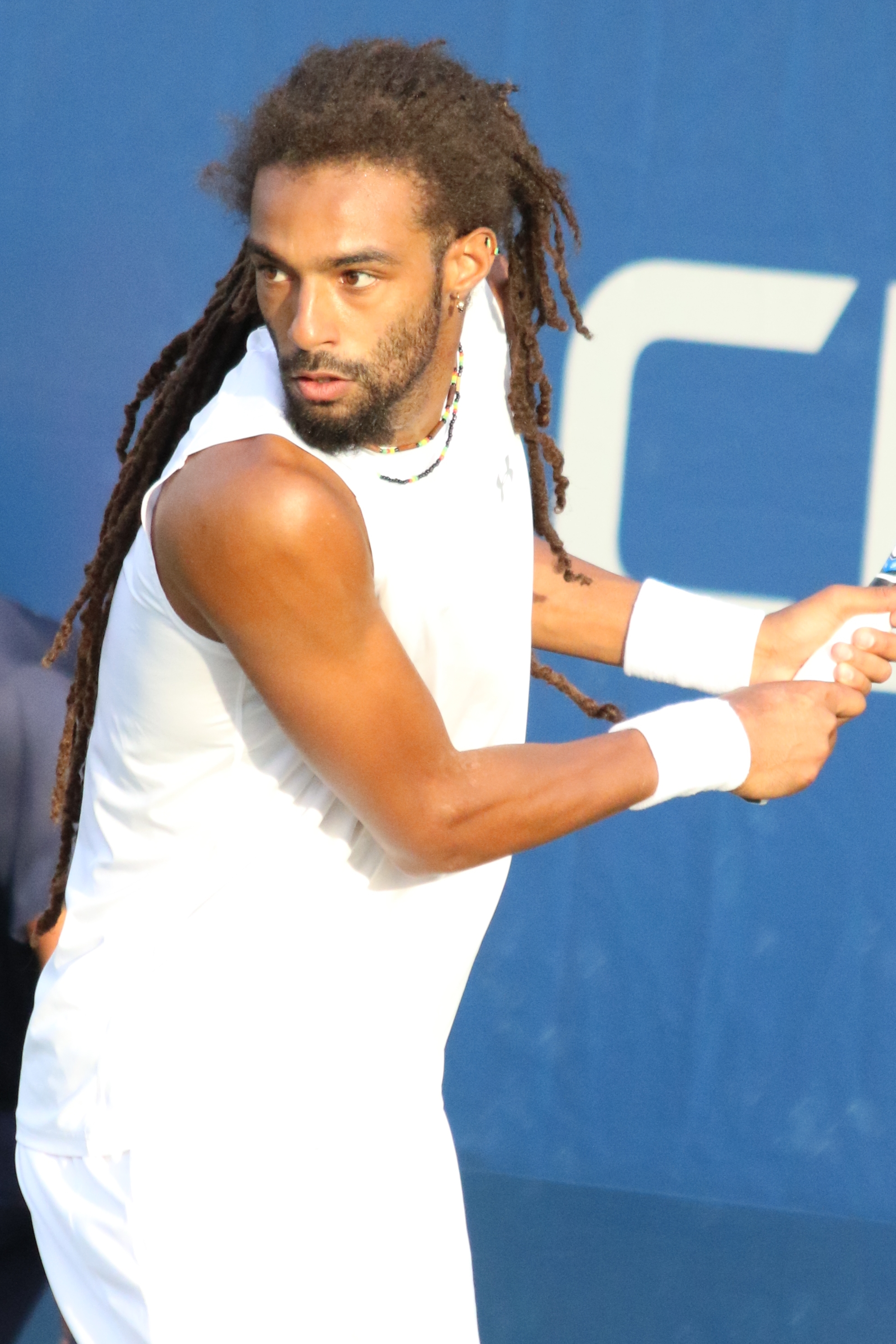
- Brown at the 2016 US Open
- Country (sports): Jamaica (2002–2010, 2022–2024); Germany (2011–2022)
- Residence: Winsen an der Aller, Germany
- Born: December 8, 1984 (age 41) Celle, West Germany
- Height: 1.96 m (6 ft 5 in)
- Turned pro: 2002
- Retired: 2021 (singles); 2024 (doubles)
- Plays: Right-handed (two-handed backhand)
- Prize money: US$3,129,783

Singles
- Career record: 62–99
- Career titles: 0
- Highest ranking: No. 64 (10 October 2016)

Grand Slam singles results
- Australian Open: 1R (2011, 2015, 2017, 2018)
- French Open: 2R (2016)
- Wimbledon: 3R (2013, 2015)
- US Open: 2R (2010, 2017)

Other tournaments
- Olympic Games: 1R (2016)

Doubles
- Career record: 82–105
- Career titles: 2
- Highest ranking: No. 43 (14 May 2012)

Grand Slam doubles results
- Australian Open: 2R (2011, 2015)
- French Open: 3R (2011)
- Wimbledon: 3R (2024)
- US Open: 1R (2012, 2016)

Dustin Brown (born 8 December 1984), nicknamed "Dreddy", is a German-Jamaican former professional tennis player who rose to fame after beating Rafael Nadal at the Halle Open in 2014 and at Wimbledon in 2015. He was known for his technique, speed, and unorthodox playing style, often entertaining the crowd with trick shots.

Brown competed mainly on the ATP Challenger Tour, in singles and doubles, having won 31 titles overall. He achieved his career-high singles ranking of No. 64 in October 2016 and his career-high doubles ranking of No. 43 in May 2012. Brown is one of only two players who are undefeated against Rafael Nadal after playing more than one match with him (the other being Àlex Corretja), holding a 2–0 head-to-head record.

Brown did not reach an ATP singles final, but made two semifinals at the 2016 Open Sud de France and the 2016 Swiss Open Gstaad. In doubles, he won two titles on the ATP Tour.

== Early life ==
Brown was born on 8 December 1984 in Celle, West Germany, a town situated near the city of Hanover. His father Leroy met his German-born mother Inge in Jamaica before settling in Celle. This unusual dual nationality has earned him the nickname "Shabba" based on a line from Jamie Foxx in the 1997 comedy Booty Call where he claimed to be a good tennis player. He also has two half-brothers named Steve and Dean. He played several sports such as football, judo, and handball throughout his childhood. He started playing tennis at the age of 5 but didn't really focus on the sport until the age of eight: "When I made the decision to pursue tennis instead of football, of course I wanted to be successful. I didn't want just to end up playing for a club somewhere." His reported idol growing up was Russian tennis player and former world No. 1 Marat Safin. His junior tennis career went well enough to draw the attention of Kim Michael Wittenberg, an American who ran a tennis academy near Hanover. Wittenberg regularly gave Brown lessons, and according to his pupil, he "taught me to play tennis."

At 11 years old, in 1996, the family returned to Jamaica, settling in Montego Bay. The move was motivated in part by the high cost of training in Germany as well as his need to develop discipline on the court: "I was pretty mentally soft when I was young. Anything could happen when I played—I could lose my temper, I got disqualified." In Jamaica, track and field, soccer, and cricket were the sports that commanded the best resources, tennis was played on poorly maintained public courts and with low-quality balls. Nevertheless, he continued to play junior tennis.

In 2004, 20-year-old Brown became unhappy with tennis in Jamaica, his family thought his potential warranted returning to Germany and a Volkswagen campervan that could sleep up to three people set him up. The mobile lodgings enabled him to play in the various European tournaments: "It was a brilliant idea by my parents, otherwise I wouldn't have been able to go on playing. It was a means of competing week in, week out." He also brought in income with his racquet stringing machine, giving other players lower cost service, and letting out his spare mobile accommodations for a night.

== Junior career ==
Brown played his first junior match in August 1999 at the age of 14 at a grade 4 tournament in Jamaica. In 2002, he competed in two junior Grand Slam tournaments, reaching the second round of Wimbledon in singles as a qualifier and the quarterfinals of the U.S. Open in doubles partnering Luka Gregorc. Brown achieved a career-high junior singles ranking of 61 on March 18, 2002, and ended his junior career with a 34–26 record. In doubles, he achieved a career-high ranking of 116 on November 11, 2002, and a 15–24 overall record.

Junior Grand Slam results – Singles:

Australian Open: A (-)
French Open: A (-)
Wimbledon: 2R (2002)
US Open: 1R (2002)

Junior Grand Slam results – Doubles:

Australian Open: A (-)
French Open: A (-)
Wimbledon: 1R (2002)
US Open: QF (2002)

== Professional career ==
=== 2002–2009 ===
Brown officially turned pro in April 2002 at the age of 17 and began representing Jamaica. Between 2002 and 2009, Brown reached 11 ITF singles finals and 32 ITF doubles finals, winning 3 singles titles and 16 doubles titles.

Brown made his ATP debut at the 2003 Hall of Fame Open after qualifying for the main draw. He lost in the first round to Bob Bryan in three sets.

Brown reached his first Challenger final at the 2009 Baden Open where he lost to Florian Mayer in straight sets. Three months later, he won his first Challenger title at the 2009 Samarkand Challenger defeating Jonathan Dasnières de Veigy in the final. For the rest of 2009, he made four more Challenger finals including one doubles final. These results helped increase his ranking from 494 at the start of the year to 144 at year's end.

=== 2010–2019 ===
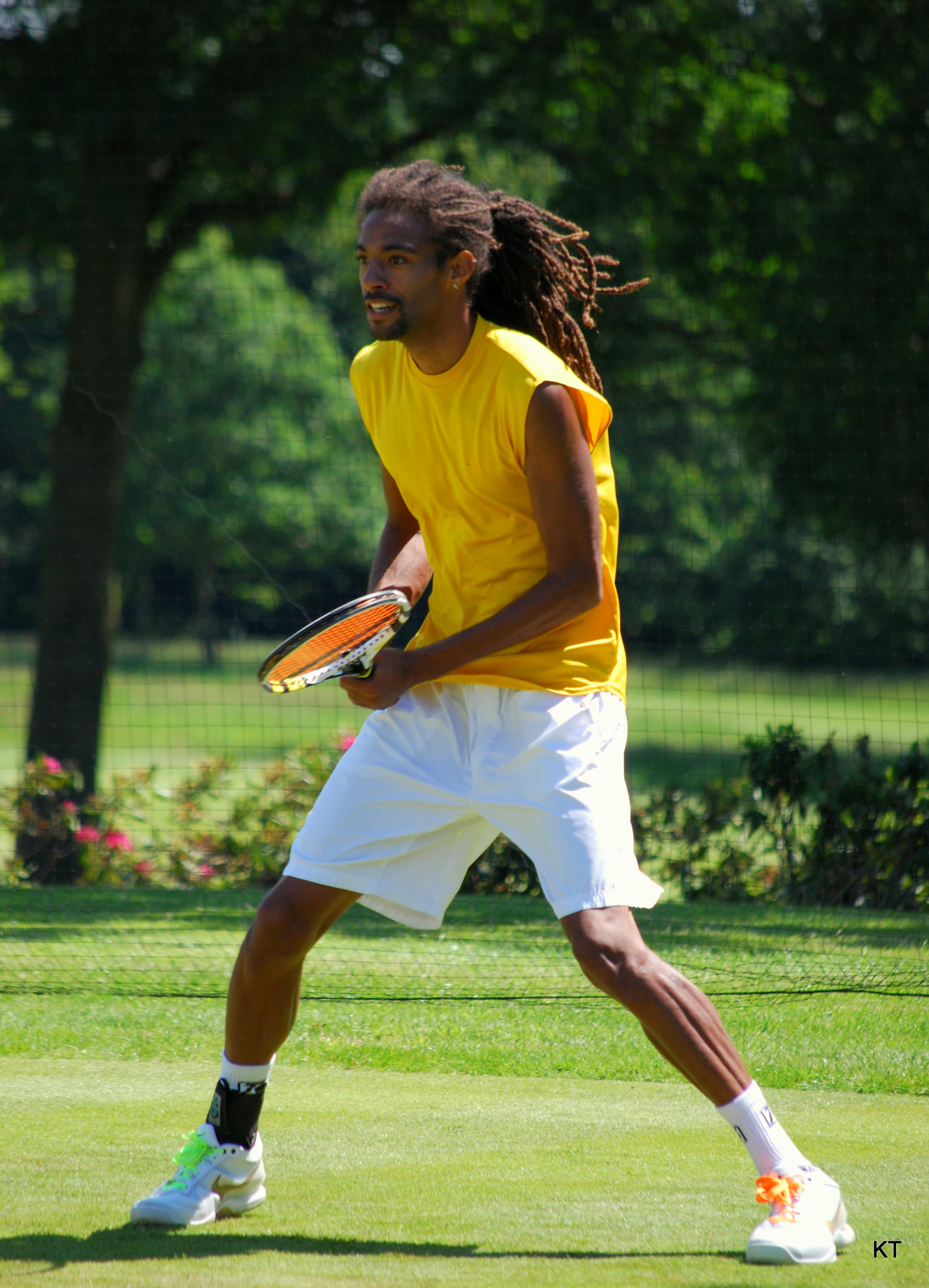
Brown at the Boodles Challenge in 2010

2010 is considered to be Brown's breakout year. At the SA Tennis Open in Johannesburg, South Africa, he made his first ATP main-draw appearance since 2003, defeating fourth seed Marco Chiudinelli and No. 139 Laurent Recouderc to reach the quarterfinals, where he lost to eventual runner-up Stéphane Robert. He became the second Jamaican after Doug Burke at the 1989 BP National Championships in Wellington, New Zealand, to reach the quarterfinals of an ATP tournament.

On May 17, 2010, Brown reached the top 100 for the first time, debuting at No. 99. In June, he competed in his third ATP main draw at the Queen's Club Championships in London, defeating Frank Dancevic in three sets before losing to Denis Istomin in the second round. It was reported at the time that lack of funding and support from the Jamaican Tennis Association had tempted him to switch national association to Great Britain, his paternal grandmother being British. Later that month, Brown made his Grand Slam debut at Wimbledon after receiving direct entry into the main draw. He lost in the first round to 16th seed Jürgen Melzer in four sets. After another ATP quarterfinal at the 2010 Hall of Fame Open, Brown received direct entry into the US Open and won his opening match against Rubén Ramírez Hidalgo to record his first Grand Slam win. He lost in the second round to world No. 4 Andy Murray in straight sets.

In September 2010, Brown won his first ATP doubles title at the 2010 Open de Moselle partnering Rogier Wassen.

In October 2010, Brown began representing Germany and competed under the German flag for the first time at the Challenger Eckental, where he reached the semifinals before losing to eventual champion Igor Sijsling. His first title success playing under the German flag came a week later at the Lambertz Open, defeating Sijsling in the final.

Brown won his second ATP doubles title at the 2012 Grand Prix Hassan II partnering Paul Hanley.

Brown partnered Jonathan Marray at the 2012 French Open; they lost in the first round. Brown/Marray also reached four Challenger tour finals in 2012, winning two in Bosnia and Italy.

At 2013 Wimbledon, Brown qualified for the main draw and went all the way to the third round defeating Guillermo García López and former champion Lleyton Hewitt before falling to Adrian Mannarino in straight sets.

At the 2014 U.S. Men's Clay Court Championships, Brown upset first seed and world No. 9 John Isner in the second round to claim his first-ever win over a top 10 player. He would lose to Sam Querrey in the next round.

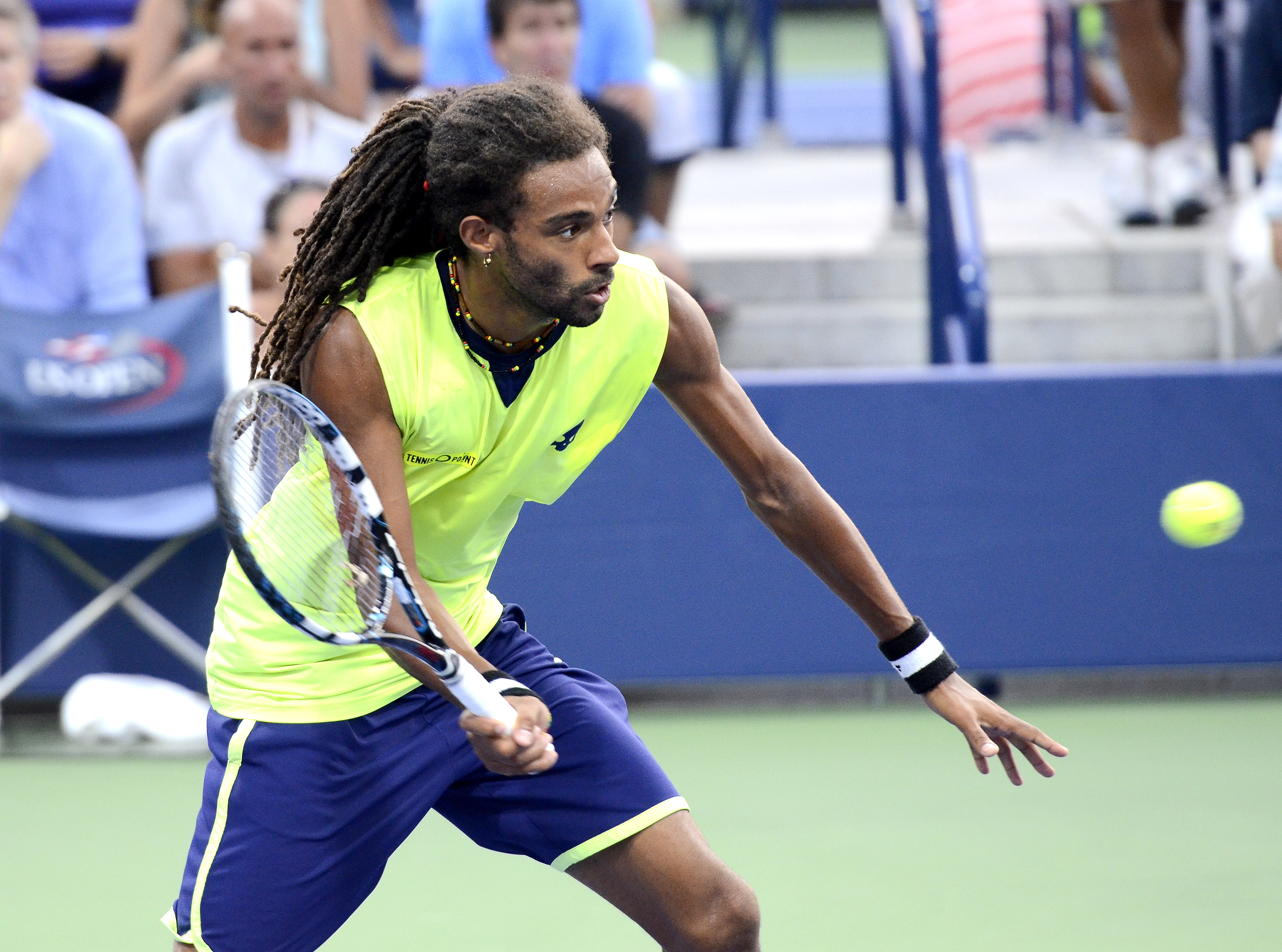
Brown at the 2014 US Open.

In 2014 he achieved his most significant career win by defeating world No. 1 Rafael Nadal at the Halle Open as a wildcard.

At Wimbledon in 2015 Brown came through qualifying without dropping a set. After beating Yen-hsun Lu in the first round, Brown then upset, for the second time in his career, 10th seed and two-time champion Rafael Nadal in four sets in the second round, before losing to Victor Troicki in four sets in the next round.

In January 2016, Brown played world No. 1 Novak Djokovic at the Qatar Open. He lost in straight sets.

Brown reached his first singles semifinal on the ATP World Tour at the 2016 Open Sud de France after having lost eight consecutive quarterfinal matches. There, he lost against top seed and eventual champion Richard Gasquet in three sets.

Brown reached a career debut second round of the French Open in 2016.

After winning the 2016 Aegon Manchester Trophy, Brown received a wild card for the 2016 Wimbledon Championships. There, he defeated Dušan Lajović in the first round before losing to Nick Kyrgios in the second. Both matches were decided in five sets.

Brown made his second ATP singles semifinal at the 2016 Swiss Open Gstaad but lost to top seed and eventual champion Feliciano López in three sets.

Brown competed in the first round of the 2016 Summer Olympics against Thomaz Bellucci of Brazil. Brown was leading 6–4, 4–4 when he went down with an ankle injury. Medical staff taped him, he returned to the match playing two points. Bellucci increased the score to 4–5 in the second set. Brown could not return play and retired in tears.

On October 10, 2016, Brown achieved a career-high singles ranking of 64 and ended the year ranked 72.

Brown upset world No. 7 Marin Čilić at the 2017 Open Sud de France. He would retire after just one game of play against Benoît Paire in the next round due to a back injury.

Brown lost in straight sets to Andy Murray at Wimbledon in 2017 in the second round.

Brown qualified for the 2018 Australian Open in what would be his last grand slam to date. He lost to João Sousa in the first round in five sets.

At the 2018 Open Sud de France, Brown was one game away from defeating Nicolas Mahut in the first round, but he sustained a back injury and could not continue to play giving Mahut the victory. He left the court in tears.

In April 2019, Brown reclaimed an ATP Challenger singles title from three years previous at the Mouratoglou Open in Sophia Antipolis, winning the final over Filip Krajinović in straight sets.

On 13 June 2019, Brown upset compatriot and world No. 5 Alexander Zverev at the 2019 Stuttgart Open in the second round. Following this victory, he lost in a third-set tiebreaker to Félix Auger-Aliassime in the quarterfinal.

=== 2020–2022 ===
Brown reached the qualifying competition of the 2020 French Open Qualifying and the 2021 Australian Open Qualifying before being eliminated both times.

Throughout 2021, Brown seemed to focus less on singles and more on doubles as he was competing in more doubles events than singles and was finding more success as he was reaching a handful of quarterfinals and semifinals in challenger events and ATP events.

Brown received a wildcard into the 2021 Stuttgart Open due to his performance in the previous edition. He lost in the first round to Nikoloz Basilashvili in straight sets. This was his last professional singles match.

In 2022, Brown stopped representing Germany and returned to representing Jamaica in tournaments.

=== 2024: Retirement ===
Due to persistent injuries since the start of 2018, Brown announced in January 2024 that he would retire from professional tennis at the end of the 2024 season.

== Davis Cup ==
Brown made his Davis Cup debut for Jamaica in 2003 which would be the only time he played for Jamaica at the Davis Cup. He won 4 of 5 singles matches played and all 3 doubles matches played.

Brown only played one match for Germany in 2015 in the singles where he lost to Dominican Víctor Estrella Burgos in four sets.

Brown's combined record for Jamaica and Germany is 4–2 in singles and 3–0 in doubles giving him an overall record of 7–2.

== Style of play ==
Brown was considered a serve-and-volleyer. His average serve speed was around 190–205 km/h, but reached up to 220 km/h. His shotmaking style was unorthodox, as he mixed up hard-hitting groundstrokes with light drop shots. He often used trick shots, including tweeners, behind-the-back shots, diving shots, down-the-line shots, jump shots and drop shots. As a result, he was described as one of the most entertaining players on the tour.

== Performance timelines ==
Key
W	F	SF	QF	#R	RR	Q#	P#	DNQ	A	Z#	PO	G	S	B	NMS	NTI	P	NH

(W) winner; (F) finalist; (SF) semifinalist; (QF) quarterfinalist; (#R) rounds 4, 3, 2, 1; (RR) round-robin stage; (Q#) qualification round; (P#) preliminary round; (DNQ) did not qualify; (A) absent; (Z#) Davis/Fed Cup Zonal Group (with number indication) or (PO) play-off; (G) gold, (S) silver or (B) bronze Olympic/Paralympic medal; (NMS) not a Masters tournament; (NTI) not a Tier I tournament; (P) postponed; (NH) not held; (SR) strike rate (events won / competed); (W–L) win–loss record.
To avoid confusion and double counting, these charts are updated at the conclusion of a tournament or when the player's participation has ended.

=== Singles ===
	Jamaica								Germany													
Tournament	2003	2004	2005	2006	2007	2008	2009	2010	2011	2012	2013	2014	2015	2016	2017	2018	2019	2020	2021	SR	W–L	Win%
Grand Slam tournaments
Australian Open	A	A	A	A	A	A	A	Q2	1R	Q1	Q2	Q1	1R	Q1	1R	1R	Q3	Q1	Q3	0 / 4	0–4	0%
French Open	A	A	A	A	A	A	A	A	1R	Q1	A	1R	Q1	2R	1R	Q1	Q3	Q3	A	0 / 4	1–4	20%
Wimbledon	A	A	A	A	A	A	A	1R	Q1	1R	3R	1R	3R	2R	2R	Q1	Q2	NH	A	0 / 7	6–7	46%
US Open	A	A	A	A	A	A	A	2R	A	Q2	A	1R	1R	1R	2R	A	A	A	A	0 / 5	2–5	29%
Win–loss	0–0	0–0	0–0	0–0	0–0	0–0	0–0	1–2	0–2	0–1	2–1	0–3	2–3	2–3	2–4	0–1	0–0	0–0	0–0	0 / 20	9–20	31%
ATP Tour Masters 1000
Indian Wells Open	A	A	A	A	A	A	A	Q1	1R	A	A	A	1R	A	1R	A	A	NH	A	0 / 3	0–3	0%
Miami Open	A	A	A	A	A	A	A	Q1	A	A	A	A	Q2	A	1R	A	A	NH	A	0 / 1	0–1	0%
Paris Masters	A	A	A	A	A	A	A	A	A	A	A	A	A	Q2	A	A	A	A	A	0 / 0	0–0	–
National representation
Summer Olympics	NH	A	not held			A	not held			A	not held			1R	not held				A	0 / 1	0–1	0%
Davis Cup	Z3	A	A	A	A	A	A	A	A	A	A	A	PO	A	A	A	A	A	A	0 / 0	4–2	67%
Career statistics
Tournaments	1	0	0	0	0	0	0	10	10	5	3	16	15	12	20	4	1	0	1	98		
Hard Win–loss	0–0	0–0	0–0	0–0	0–0	0–0	0–0	3–4	1–6	0–0	0–1	5–6	4–10	5–6	5–10	0–2	0–0	0–0	0–0	0 / 44	23–45	34%
Clay win–loss	0–0	0–0	0–0	0–0	0–0	0–0	0–0	0–2	1–2	4–3	0–1	6–8	1–2	6–4	3–7	0–2	0–0	0–0	0–0	0 / 31	21–31	40%
Grass win–loss	0–1	0–0	0–0	0–0	0–0	0–0	0–0	3–4	0–2	0–2	2–1	2–2	5–4	2–2	2–3	0–0	2–1	0–0	0–1	0 / 23	18–23	44%
Overall win–loss	0–1	0–0	0–0	0–0	0–0	0–0	0–0	6–10	2–10	4–5	2–3	13–16	10–16	13–12	10–20	0–4	2–1	0–0	0–1	0 / 98	62–99	39%
Win %	0%	–	–	–	–	–	–	38%	17%	44%	40%	45%	38%	52%	33%	0%	67%	–	0%	39%		
Year-end ranking	527	820	622	566	459	494	144	92	161	167	111	89	118	72	125	230	203	261	343			

=== Doubles ===
Current through the 2024 Moselle Open.

	Jamaica								Germany												Jamaica				
Tournament	2003	2004	2005	2006	2007	2008	2009	2010	2011	2012	2013	2014	2015	2016	2017	2018	2019	2020	2021	2022	2023	2024	SR	W–L	Win%
Grand Slam tournaments
Australian Open	A	A	A	A	A	A	A	A	2R	1R	1R	1R	2R	1R	1R	A	A	A	A	A	A	A	0 / 7	2–7	22%
French Open	A	A	A	A	A	A	A	A	3R	1R	A	A	1R	A	1R	A	A	A	A	A	A	1R	0 / 5	2–5	29%
Wimbledon	A	A	A	A	A	A	A	A	1R	2R	1R	2R	1R	2R	1R	A	A	NH	A	A	A	3R	0 / 8	5–8	38%
US Open	A	A	A	A	A	A	A	A	A	1R	A	A	A	1R	A	A	A	A	A	A	A	A	0 / 2	0–2	0%
Win–loss	0–0	0–0	0–0	0–0	0–0	0–0	0–0	0–0	3–3	1–4	0–2	1–2	1–3	1–3	0–3	0–0	0–0	0–0	0–0	0–0	0–0	2–2	0 / 22	9–22	29%
Career statistics
Tournaments	1	0	0	0	0	0	0	5	15	15	12	11	13	8	9	2	2	0	4	4	4	6	111		
Titles	0	0	0	0	0	0	0	1	0	1	0	0	0	0	0	0	0	0	0	0	0	0	2		
Finals	0	0	0	0	0	0	0	1	0	3	1	0	0	0	1	0	0	0	0	0	0	0	6		
Overall win–loss	0–1	0–0	0–0	0–0	0–0	0–0	0–0	9–4	8–15	18–14	11–12	9–11	6–13	4–7	4–8	3–1	1–2	0–0	3–4	0–4	3–3	3–6	82–105		
Win %	0%	–	–	–	–	–	–	69%	35%	56%	48%	45%	32%	36%	33%	75%	33%	–	43%	0%	50%	33%	44%		
Year-end ranking	727	802	518	582	444	256	206	53	69	56	86	85	82	173	182	173	217	219	137	109	200	297			

== ATP career finals ==
=== Doubles: 6 (2 titles, 4 runner-ups) ===
Legend Grand Slam tournaments (0–0) ATP Finals (0–0) ATP Masters 1000 (0–0) ATP 500 (0–0) ATP 250 (2–4)	Finals by surface Hard (1–1) Clay (1–3) Grass (0–0)	Finals by setting Outdoors (1–3) Indoors (1–1)

Result	W–L	Date	Tournament	Tier	Surface	Partner	Opponents	Score
Win	1–0	Sep 2010	Moselle Open, France	ATP 250	Hard (i)	(Netherlands) Rogier Wassen	(Brazil) Marcelo Melo (Brazil) Bruno Soares	6–3, 6–3
Loss	1–1	Feb 2012	Open 13, France	ATP 250	Hard (i)	(France) Jo-Wilfried Tsonga	(France) Nicolas Mahut (France) Édouard Roger-Vasselin	6–3, 3–6, [6–10]
Win	2–1	Apr 2012	Grand Prix Hassan II, Morocco	ATP 250	Clay	(Australia) Paul Hanley	(Italy) Daniele Bracciali (Italy) Fabio Fognini	7–5, 6–3
Loss	2–2	Jul 2012	Austrian Open Kitzbühel, Austria	ATP 250	Clay	(Australia) Paul Hanley	(Czech Republic) František Čermák (Austria) Julian Knowle	6–7^{(4–7)}, 6–3, [10–12]
Loss	2–3	Apr 2013	Grand Prix Hassan II, Morocco	ATP 250	Clay	(Germany) Christopher Kas	(Austria) Julian Knowle (Slovakia) Filip Polášek	3–6, 2–6
Loss	2–4	Apr 2017	US Clay Court Championships, United States	ATP 250	Clay	(United States) Frances Tiafoe	(Chile) Julio Peralta (Argentina) Horacio Zeballos	6–4, 5–7, [6–10]

== ATP Challenger finals ==
=== Singles: 17 (8–9) ===
Finals by surface
Hard (2–4)
Clay (4–3)
Grass (1–0)
Carpet (1–2)

Result	W–L	Date	Tournament	Surface	Opponent	Score
Loss	0–1	May 2009	Karlsruhe, Germany	Clay	(Germany) Florian Mayer	2–6, 4–6
Win	1–1	Aug 2009	Samarqand, Uzbekistan	Clay	(France) Jonathan Dasnières de Veigy	7–6^{(7–3)}, 6–3
Loss	1–2	Aug 2009	Almaty, Kazakhstan	Hard	(Ukraine) Ivan Sergeyev	3–6, 7–5, 4–6
Loss	1–3	Nov 2009	Eckental, Germany	Carpet (i)	(Germany) Daniel Brands	4–6, 4–6
Loss	1–4	Nov 2009	Aachen, Germany	Carpet (i)	(United States) Rajeev Ram	6–7^{(2–7)}, 7–6^{(7–5)}, 6–7^{(2–7)}
Win	2–4	Apr 2010	Johannesburg, South Africa	Hard	(South Africa) Izak van der Merwe	7–6^{(7–2)}, 6–3
Win	3–4	Nov 2010	Aachen, Germany	Carpet (i)	(Netherlands) Igor Sijsling	6–3, 7–6^{(7–3)}
Win	4–4	Mar 2012	Bath, United Kingdom	Hard (i)	(Czech Republic) Jan Mertl	7–6^{(7–1)}, 6–4
Loss	4–5	Mar 2013	Sarajevo, Bosnia	Hard (i)	(France) Adrian Mannarino	6–7^{(3–7)}, 6–7^{(2–7)}
Win	5–5	Sep 2013	Genoa, Italy	Clay	(Italy) Filippo Volandri	7–6^{(7–5)}, 6–3
Loss	5–6	Nov 2013	Andria, Italy	Hard (i)	(Hungary) Márton Fucsovics	3–6, 4–6
Win	6–6	Sep 2014	Szczecin, Poland	Clay	(Germany) Jan-Lennard Struff	6–4, 6–3
Loss	6–7	Oct 2015	Fairfield, United States	Hard	(United States) Taylor Fritz	3–6, 4–6
Win	7–7	Jun 2016	Manchester, United Kingdom	Grass	(Chinese Taipei) Lu Yen-hsun	7–6^{(7–4)}, 6–1
Loss	7–8	Sep 2016	Szczecin, Poland	Clay	(Italy) Alessandro Giannessi	2–6, 3–6
Loss	7–9	Sep 2018	Genoa, Italy	Clay	(Italy) Lorenzo Sonego	2–6, 1–6
Win	8–9	Apr 2019	Sophia Antipolis, France	Clay	(Serbia) Filip Krajinović	6–3, 7–5

=== Doubles: 48 (26–22) ===
Finals by surface
Hard (5–11)
Clay (18–8)
Grass (0–1)
Carpet (3–2)

Result	W–L	Date	Tournament	Surface	Partner	Opponents	Score
Win	1–0	Sep 2009	Banja Luka, Bosnia	Clay	(Austria) Rainer Eitzinger	(Bosnia and Herzegovina) Ismar Gorčić (Italy) Simone Vagnozzi	6–4, 6–3
Loss	1–1	Feb 2010	Belgrade, Serbia	Carpet (i)	(Austria) Martin Slanar	(Serbia) Ilija Bozoljac (United Kingdom) Jamie Delgado	3–6, 3–6
Win	2–1	Apr 2010	Naples, Italy	Clay	(United States) Jesse Witten	(India) Rohan Bopanna (Pakistan) Aisam-ul-Haq Qureshi	7–6^{(7–4)}, 7–5
Win	3–1	May 2010	Rhodos, Greece	Hard	(Germany) Simon Stadler	(United Kingdom) Jonathan Marray (United Kingdom) Jamie Murray	7–6^{(7–4)}, 6–7^{(4–7)}, [10–7]
Loss	3–2	May 2010	Cairo, Egypt	Clay	(Germany) Andre Begemann	(Austria) Martin Slanar (Italy) Simone Vagnozzi	3–6, 4–6
Loss	3–3	May 2010	Biella, Italy	Clay	(Italy) Alessandro Motti	(United States) James Cerretani (Canada) Adil Shamasdin	3–6, 6–2, [9–11]
Win	4–3	Jun 2010	Fürth, Germany	Clay	(Australia) Rameez Junaid	(Germany) Martin Emmrich (Australia) Joseph Sirianni	6–3, 6–1
Win	5–3	Aug 2010	Kitzbühel, Austria	Clay	(Netherlands) Rogier Wassen	(Chile) Hans Podlipnik Castillo (Austria) Max Raditschnigg	3–6, 7–5, [10–7]
Win	6–3	Sep 2010	Szczecin, Poland	Clay	(Netherlands) Rogier Wassen	(Australia) Rameez Junaid (Germany) Philipp Marx	6–4, 7–5
Win	7–3	Nov 2010	Helsinki, Finland	Hard (i)	(Germany) Martin Emmrich	(Finland) Henri Kontinen (Finland) Jarkko Nieminen	7–6^{(19–17)}, 0–6, [10–7]
Loss	7–4	Mar 2011	Dallas, United States	Hard (i)	(Germany) Björn Phau	(United States) Scott Lipsky (United States) Rajeev Ram	6–7^{(3–7)}, 4–6
Loss	7–5	Jun 2011	Nottingham, United Kingdom	Grass	(Germany) Martin Emmrich	(United Kingdom) Colin Fleming (United Kingdom) Ross Hutchins	6–4, 6–7^{(8–10)}, [11–13]
Win	8–5	Aug 2011	Manerbio, Italy	Clay	(Croatia) Lovro Zovko	(Italy) Alessio di Mauro (Italy) Alessandro Motti	7–6^{(7–4)}, 7–5
Win	9–5	Sep 2011	Genoa, Italy	Clay	(Argentina) Horacio Zeballos	(Australia) Jordan Kerr (United States) Travis Parrott	6–2, 7–5
Win	10–5	Nov 2011	Ortisei, Italy	Carpet (i)	(Croatia) Lovro Zovko	(Germany) Philipp Petzschner (Germany) Alexander Waske	6–4, 7–6^{(7–4)}
Loss	10–6	Feb 2012	Quimper, France	Hard (i)	(United Kingdom) Jonathan Marray	(France) Pierre-Hugues Herbert (France) Ross Hutchins	6–7^{(5–7)}, 4–6
Loss	10–7	Mar 2012	Cherbourg, France	Hard (i)	(United Kingdom) Jonathan Marray	(Lithuania) Laurynas Grigelis (Belarus) Uladzimir Ignatik	6–4, 6–7^{(9–11)}, [0–10]
Win	11–7	Mar 2012	Sarajevo, Bosnia	Hard (i)	(United Kingdom) Jonathan Marray	(Slovakia) Michal Mertiňák (Slovakia) Igor Zelenay	7–6^{(7–2)}, 2–6, [11–9]
Win	12–7	Apr 2012	Rome, Italy	Clay	(United Kingdom) Jonathan Marray	(Romania) Andrei Dăescu (Romania) Florin Mergea	6–4, 7–6^{(7–0)}
Loss	12–8	Aug 2013	Meerbusch, Germany	Clay	(Germany) Philipp Marx	(Australia) Rameez Junaid (Germany) Frank Moser	3–6, 6–7^{(4–7)}
Win	13–8	Nov 2013	Eckental, Germany	Carpet (i)	(Germany) Philipp Marx	(Poland) Piotr Gadomski (Poland) Mateusz Kowalczyk	7–6^{(7–4)}, 6–2
Loss	13–9	Nov 2013	Helsinki, Finland	Hard (i)	(Germany) Philipp Marx	(Finland) Henri Kontinen (Finland) Jarkko Nieminen	5–7, 7–5, [5–10]
Win	14–9	Sep 2014	Szczecin, Poland (2)	Clay	(Germany) Jan-Lennard Struff	(Poland) Tomasz Bednarek (Slovakia) Igor Zelenay	6–2, 6–4
Win	15–9	May 2015	Rome, Italy	Clay	(Czech Republic) František Čermák	(Argentina) Andrés Molteni (Argentina) Marco Trungelliti	6–1, 6–2
Win	16–9	Aug 2015	Meerbusch, Germany	Clay	(Australia) Rameez Junaid	(Netherlands) Wesley Koolhof (Netherlands) Matwé Middelkoop	6–4, 7–5
Loss	16–10	Oct 2015	Sacramento, United States	Hard	(Germany) Daniel Brands	(Slovenia) Blaž Kavčič (Slovenia) Grega Žemlja	1–6, 6–3, [3–10]
Loss	16–11	Oct 2015	Fairfield, United States	Hard	(Australia) Carsten Ball	(Sweden) Johan Brunström (Denmark) Frederik Nielsen	3–6, 7–5, [5–10]
Win	17–11	Oct 2015	Las Vegas, United States	Hard	(Australia) Carsten Ball	(South Africa) Dean O’Brien (South Africa) Ruan Roelofse	3–6, 6–3, [10–6]
Loss	17–12	Nov 2015	Andria, Italy	Hard (i)	(Australia) Carsten Ball	(Switzerland) Marco Chiudinelli (Germany) Frank Moser	6–7^{(5–7)}, 5–7
Loss	17–13	Aug 2017	Meerbusch, Germany	Clay	(Croatia) Antonio Šančić	(Germany) Kevin Krawietz (Germany) Andreas Mies	1–6, 6–7^{(5–7)}
Loss	17–14	Oct 2017	Ismaning, Germany	Carpet (i)	(Germany) Tim Pütz	(Croatia) Marin Draganja (Croatia) Tomislav Draganja	7–6^{(7–1)}, 2–6, [8–10]
Win	18–14	Sep 2018	Como, Italy	Clay	(Germany) Andre Begemann	(Slovakia) Martin Kližan (Slovakia) Filip Polášek	3–6, 6–4, [10–5]
Win	19–14	Jan 2019	Nouméa, New Caledonia	Hard	(United States) Donald Young	(Sweden) André Göransson (Netherlands) Sem Verbeek	7–5, 6–4
Loss	19–15	Feb 2019	Bergamo, Italy	Hard (i)	(Bosnia and Herzegovina) Tomislav Brkić	(Lithuania) Laurynas Grigelis (Czech Republic) Zdeněk Kolář	5–7, 6–7^{(7–9)}
Win	20–15	Nov 2020	Eckental, Germany (2)	Carpet (i)	(France) Antoine Hoang	(United Kingdom) Lloyd Glasspool (United States) Alex Lawson	6–7^{(8–10)}, 7–5, [13–11]
Loss	20–16	Jun 2021	Milan, Italy	Clay	(Austria) Sam Weissborn	(Czech Republic) Vít Kopřiva (Czech Republic) Jiří Lehečka	4–6, 0–6
Loss	20–17	Aug 2021	Meerbusch, Germany	Clay	(Netherlands) Robin Haase	(Poland) Szymon Walków (Poland) Jan Zieliński	3–6, 1–6
Win	21–17	Sep 2021	Tulln, Austria	Clay	(Italy) Andrea Vavassori	(Brazil) Rafael Matos (Brazil) Felipe Meligeni Alves	7–6^{(7–5)}, 6–1
Win	22–17	Oct 2021	Naples, Italy (2)	Clay	(Italy) Andrea Vavassori	(Bosnia and Herzegovina) Mirza Bašić (Croatia) Nino Serdarušić	7–5, 7–6^{(7–5)}
Loss	22–18	Oct 2021	Naples, Italy	Clay	(Italy) Andrea Vavassori	(Italy) Marco Bortolotti (Spain) Sergio Martos Gornés	4–6, 6–3, [7–10]
Win	23–18	May 2022	Troisdorf, Germany	Clay	(United States) Evan King	(Germany) Hendrik Jebens (Poland) Piotr Matuszewski	6–4, 7–5
Win	24–18	Aug 2022	Cordenons, Italy	Clay	(Italy) Andrea Vavassori	(Serbia) Ivan Sabanov (Serbia) Matej Sabanov	6–4, 7–5
Loss	24–19	Sep 2022	Como, Italy	Clay	(Germany) Julian Lenz	(Austria) Alexander Erler (Austria) Lucas Miedler	1–6, 6–7^{(3–7)}
Win	25–19	Sep 2022	Szczecin, Poland (3)	Clay	(Italy) Andrea Vavassori	(Czech Republic) Roman Jebavý (Czech Republic) Adam Pavlásek	6–4, 5–7, [10–8]
Win	26–19	Sep 2022	Genoa, Italy (2)	Clay	(Italy) Andrea Vavassori	(Czech Republic) Roman Jebavý (Czech Republic) Adam Pavlásek	6–2, 6–2
Loss	26–20	Oct 2022	Hamburg, Germany	Hard (i)	(Germany) Julian Lenz	(Philippines) Treat Huey (United States) Max Schnur	6–7^{(6–8)}, 4–6
Loss	26–21	Nov 2022	Roanne, France	Hard (i)	(Poland) Szymon Walków	(France) Sadio Doumbia (France) Fabien Reboul	6–7^{(5–7)}, 4–6
Loss	26–22	Apr 2023	Lille, France	Hard (i)	(Pakistan) Aisam-ul-Haq Qureshi	(Australia) Max Purcell (Australia) Jason Taylor	6–7^{(3–7)}, 4–6

== ITF Futures finals ==
=== Singles: 11 (3–8) ===
Finals by surface
Hard (0–1)
Clay (2–5)
Carpet (1–2)

Result	W–L	Date	Tournament	Surface	Opponent	Score
Loss	0–1	Dec 2002	Jamaica F22, Trelawny	Hard	(Netherlands Antilles) Jean-Julien Rojer	4–6, 3–6
Loss	0–2	Jul 2006	Germany F7, Kassel	Clay	(Slovakia) Lukáš Lacko	6–3, 3–6, 4–6
Loss	0–3	Jan 2007	Germany F1, Nußloch	Carpet (i)	(Romania) Florin Mergea	3–6, 2–6
Win	1–3	Jul 2007	Germany F9, Römerberg	Clay	(Belgium) Ruben Bemelmans	6–3, 7–6^{(7–4)}
Loss	1–4	Sep 2007	Germany F16, Friedberg	Clay	(Germany) Marc Meigel	2–6, 6–4, 3–6
Loss	1–5	Sep 2007	France F15, Forbach	Carpet (i)	(France) Josselin Ouanna	5–7, 6–7^{(4–7)}
Loss	1–6	Apr 2008	Turkey F3, Antalya	Clay	(Moldova) Andrei Gorban	3–6, 1–6
Win	2–6	Jun 2008	Germany F8, Trier	Clay	(Germany) Tobias Clemens	7–5, 6–7^{(6–8)}, 6–0
Loss	2–7	Jan 2009	Spain F2, Magaluf	Clay	(Spain) Andoni Vivanco-Guzmán	7–6^{(7–4)}, 5–7, 6–7^{(4–7)}
Loss	2–8	Feb 2009	Spain F3, Murcia	Clay	(Spain) Javier Genaro-Martinez	4–6, 4–6
Win	3–8	Mar 2009	Switzerland F2, Vaduz	Carpet (i)	(Slovakia) Miloslav Mečíř	3–6, 6–4, 7–6^{(8–6)}

=== Doubles: 32 (16–16) ===
Finals by surface
Hard (1–2)
Clay (9–8)
Carpet (6–6)

Result	W–L	Date	Tournament	Surface	Partner	Opponents	Score
Win	1–0	Sep 2003	Jamaica F9, Montego Bay	Hard	(Jamaica) Ryan Russell	(Monaco) Clément Morel (France) Gilles Simon	7–6^{(7–4)}, 6–2
Loss	1–1	Oct 2003	Jamaica F11, Montego Bay	Hard	(Jamaica) Ryan Russell	(United Kingdom) Dan Kiernan (United Kingdom) David Sherwood	4–6, 0–2 ret.
Loss	1–2	Aug 2004	Netherlands F4, Alphen	Clay	(Netherlands) Eric Kuijlen	(Brazil) Francisco Costa (Belgium) Jeroen Masson	1–6, 6–7^{(3–7)}
Loss	1–3	Sep 2004	Germany F15, Kempten	Clay	(Germany) Sascha Hesse	(Chile) Joaquin Lillo (Germany) Armin Meixner	4–6, 6–3, 4–6
Loss	1–4	Jul 2005	Germany F6, Trier	Clay	(Germany) Sebastian Rieschick	(Australia) Rameez Junaid (Germany) Markus Schiller	0–6, 4–6
Loss	1–5	Sep 2005	Germany F13, Nußloch	Clay	(Germany) Tobias Klein	(Germany) Matthias Bachinger (Germany) Philipp Piyamongkol	4–6, 4–6
Loss	1–6	Sep 2005	Germany F14, Kempten	Clay	(Germany) Tobias Klein	(Germany) Jerome Becker (Germany) Julian Reister	6–4, 4–6, 3–6
Loss	1–7	Sep 2005	Germany F15, Friedberg	Clay	(Germany) Tobias Klein	(Germany) Jerome Becker (Germany) Julian Reister	4–6, 3–6
Win	2–7	Mar 2006	Switzerland F1, Wilen	Carpet (i)	(Germany) Tobias Klein	(Georgia (country)) Lado Chikhladze (Latvia) Deniss Pavlovs	6–4, 4–6, 7–5
Win	3–7	Mar 2006	Switzerland F2, Leuggern	Carpet (i)	(Germany) Tobias Klein	(Germany) Jerome Becker (Germany) Julian Reister	4–6, 6–3, 7–6^{(7–2)}
Win	4–7	Jul 2006	Germany F8, Trier	Clay	(Germany) Daniel Puttkammer	(Switzerland) Stefan Kilchhofer (Switzerland) Sven Swinnen	6–3, 4–6, 6–4
Loss	4–8	Feb 2007	Germany F4, Mettmann	Carpet (i)	(Germany) Sascha Kloer	(Germany) Maximilian Abel (Switzerland) Stefan Kilchhofer	6–7^{(4–7)}, 1–6
Win	5–8	Mar 2007	Switzerland F3, Wilen	Carpet (i)	(Moldova) Roman Borvanov	(Switzerland) Patrick Eichenberger (Switzerland) Dylan Sessagesimi	6–0, 6–7^{(9–11)}, 6–3
Loss	5–9	Jul 2007	Germany F9, Römerberg	Clay	(Mexico) Bruno Rodríguez	(Germany) Andre Begemann (Germany) Lars Pörschke	1–6, 6–4, 1–6
Win	6–9	Sep 2007	Germany F15, Kempten	Clay	(Belgium) Jeroen Masson	(Argentina) Nicolás Todero (Belarus) Vladimir Voltchkov	6–4, 6–4
Loss	6–10	Sep 2007	France F15, Forbach	Carpet (i)	(Germany) Daniel Müller	(Sweden) Daniel Danilović (Germany) Gero Kretschmer	3–6, 4–6
Win	7–10	Feb 2008	Germany F4, Mettmann	Carpet (i)	(Sweden) Daniel Danilović	(Switzerland) Alexander Sadecky (South Africa) Izak Van der Merwe	6–4, 4–6, [10–7]
Win	8–10	Feb 2008	Germany F5, Schwieberdingen	Carpet (i)	(Switzerland) Alexander Sadecky	(Czech Republic) Dušan Karol (South Africa) Izak van der Merwe	7–6^{(7–1)}, 7–5
Win	9–10	Mar 2008	Switzerland F1, Leuggern	Carpet (i)	(Austria) Armin Sandbichler	(Poland) Błażej Koniusz (Poland) Grzegorz Panfil	6–3, 6–2
Win	10–10	Apr 2008	Turkey F3, Antalya	Clay	(Germany) Peter Steinberger	(Germany) Daniel Stoehr (Germany) Andre Wiesler	7–5, 6–2
Win	11–10	Jun 2008	Germany F8, Trier	Clay	(Germany) Stefan Seifert	(Germany) Peter Torebko (Germany) Holger Zuehlsdorff	6–1, 6–4
Win	12–10	Jul 2008	Germany F9, Kassel	Clay	(Germany) Stefan Seifert	(Finland) Timo Nieminen (Slovakia) Adrian Sikora	5–7, 6–1, [10–5]
Loss	12–11	Sep 2008	France F14, Mulhouse	Hard (i)	(Germany) Stefan Seifert	(Belgium) Ruben Bemelmans (Belgium) Niels Desein	6–7^{(11–13)}, 3–6
Loss	12–12	Oct 2008	Germany F21, Hambach	Carpet (i)	(Germany) Stefan Seifert	(Germany) Kevin Deden (Germany) Martin Emmrich	3–6, 4–6
Loss	12–13	Jan 2009	Spain F1, Ciutadella	Clay	(Germany) Peter Steinberger	(Spain) Íñigo Cervantes (Spain) Gerard Granollers	3–6, 5–7
Win	13–13	Jan 2009	Spain F2, Magaluf	Clay	(Germany) Peter Steinberger	(Spain) Agustin Boje-Ordonez (Spain) Andoni Vivanco-Guzmán	6–7^{(3–7)}, 7–6^{(7–3)}, [12–10]
Win	14–13	Feb 2009	Spain F3, Murcia	Clay	(Germany) Daniel Stoehr	(Spain) Guillermo Alcorta (Russia) Dmitri Perevoshchikov	6–4, 6–3
Win	15–13	Feb 2009	Spain F4, Murcia	Clay	(Germany) Peter Steinberger	(Netherlands) Romano Frantzen (Russia) Dmitri Sitak	6–2, 7–6^{(7–4)}
Loss	15–14	Mar 2009	Switzerland F1, Greifensee	Carpet (i)	(Switzerland) Alexander Sadecky	(Czech Republic) Michal Tabara (Czech Republic) Roman Vögeli	7–6^{(8–6)}, 5–7, [10–12]
Loss	15–15	Mar 2009	Switzerland F2, Greifensee	Carpet (i)	(Switzerland) Alexander Sadecky	(Switzerland) Henri Laaksonen (Austria) Philipp Oswald	1–6, 4–6
Loss	15–16	Mar 2009	Switzerland F2, Vaduz	Carpet (i)	(Switzerland) Alexander Sadecky	(France) Jeremy Blandin (France) Pierrick Ysern	3–6, 2–6
Win	16–16	Jun 2009	Germany F7, Trier	Clay	(Germany) Kevin Deden	(Canada) Érik Chvojka (Germany) Patrick Taubert	4–6, 6–3, [10–6]

== Record against top 10 players ==
Brown's match record against players who have been ranked in the top 10, with those who are active in boldface.
Only ATP Tour and ATP Challenger main draw matches are considered.

Opponent	Highest ranking	Matches	Won	Lost	Win %	Last match
(Spain) Rafael Nadal	1	2	2	0	100%	Won (7–5, 3–6, 6–4, 6–4) at 2015 Wimbledon 2R
(Australia) Lleyton Hewitt	1	1	1	0	100%	Won (6–4, 6–4, 6–7^{(3–7)}, 6–2) at 2013 Wimbledon 2R
(Austria) Thomas Muster	1	1	1	0	100%	Won (6–4, 6–4) at 2010 Kitzbühel 1R
(Serbia) Novak Djokovic	1	1	0	1	0%	Lost (2–6, 2–6) at 2016 Doha 1R
(United Kingdom) Andy Murray	1	2	0	2	0%	Lost (3–6, 2–6, 2–6) at 2017 Wimbledon 2R
(Norway) Casper Ruud	2	1	1	0	100%	Won (7–6^{(7–4)}, 4–6, 6–3) at 2018 Heilbronn 1R
(Germany) Alexander Zverev	2	2	1	1	50%	Won (6–4, 6–7^{(3–7)}, 6–3) at 2019 Stuttgart 2R
(Croatia) Marin Čilić	3	1	1	0	100%	Won (6–4, 6–4) at 2017 Montpellier 2R
(Russia) Nikolay Davydenko	3	1	1	0	100%	Won (7–5, 3–6, 7–6^{(9–7)}) at 2012 Stuttgart 1R
(Switzerland) Stan Wawrinka	3	2	1	1	50%	Lost (6–4, 3–6, 6–7^{(4–7)}) at 2015 Metz 2R
(Argentina) Juan Martín del Potro	3	1	0	1	0%	Lost (6–7^{(4–7)}, 4–6) at 2016 Munich 1R
(Bulgaria) Grigor Dimitrov	3	2	0	2	0%	Lost (2–6, 3–6, 2–6) at 2015 Australian Open 1R
(Canada) Milos Raonic	3	2	0	2	0%	Lost (3–6, 4–6, 2–6) at 2017 Australian Open 1R
(Spain) David Ferrer	3	5	0	5	0%	Lost (2–6, 3–6) at 2017 Båstad 2R
(Czech Republic) Tomáš Berdych	4	1	0	1	0%	Lost (5–7, 3–6) at 2017 Stockholm 2R
(Japan) Kei Nishikori	4	1	0	1	0%	Lost (5–7, 1–6) at 2015 Halle 2R
(United States) Taylor Fritz	4	2	0	2	0%	Lost (3–6, 4–6) at 2015 Fairfield F
(South Africa) Kevin Anderson	5	1	0	1	0%	Lost (1–6, 2–6) at 2015 Acapulco 1R
(France) Jo-Wilfried Tsonga	5	1	0	1	0%	Lost (1–6, 3–6) at 2017 Doha 2R
(Italy) Matteo Berrettini	6	1	1	0	100%	Won (6–3, 6–4) at 2014 Ortisei 1R
(Poland) Hubert Hurkacz	6	1	1	0	100%	Won (6–4, 6–3) at 2017 Ismaning QF
(France) Gilles Simon	6	3	1	2	33%	Won (6–4, 6–4) at 2016 Montpellier 2R
(Canada) Félix Auger-Aliassime	6	1	0	1	0%	Lost (6–7^{(3–7)}, 7–6^{(7–2)}, 6–7^{(2–7)}) at 2019 Stuttgart QF
(France) Gaël Monfils	6	1	0	1	0%	Lost (4–6, 5–7, 0–6) at 2017 French Open 1R
(Belgium) David Goffin	7	3	3	0	100%	Won (5–7, 6–2, 7–6^{(7–2)}) at 2009 Almaty 1R
(Spain) Fernando Verdasco	7	1	1	0	100%	Won (4–6, 6–2, 7–6^{(10–8)}) at 2014 Hamburg 2R
(France) Richard Gasquet	7	1	0	1	0%	Lost (6–1, 4–6, 3–6) at 2016 Montpellier SF
(United States) John Isner	8	1	1	0	100%	Won (6–4, 6–7^{(7–9)}, 7–6^{(7–4)}) at 2014 Houston 2R
(Russia) Mikhail Youzhny	8	1	1	0	100%	Won (6–4, 6–4) at 2016 Gstaad QF
(Austria) Jürgen Melzer	8	2	0	2	0%	Lost (6–3, 2–6, 6–7^{(4–7)}) at 2016 Mons 1R
(United States) Jack Sock	8	2	0	2	0%	Lost (6–7^{(5–7)}, 6–4, 4–6) at 2016 Stockholm 2R
(Czech Republic) Radek Štěpánek	8	2	0	2	0%	Lost (1–6, 0–6) at 2013 Orléans 1R
(Cyprus) Marcos Baghdatis	8	5	0	5	0%	Lost (6–4, 6–7^{(4–7)}, 4–6) at 2017 Auckland 2R
(Spain) Roberto Bautista Agut	9	4	1	3	25%	Lost (1–6, 3–6, 6–7^{(7–7)}) at 2017 US Open 2R
(Italy) Fabio Fognini	9	1	0	1	0%	Lost (6–7^{(4–7)}, 2–6) at 2014 Munich 2R
(France) Lucas Pouille	10	2	2	0	100%	Won (6–4, 6–4) at 2014 Szczecin SF
(Argentina) Juan Mónaco	10	2	2	0	100%	Won (7–6^{(9–7)}, 6–3) at 2017 Houston 1R
(France) Arnaud Clément	10	1	1	0	100%	Won (6–2, 4–6, 7–6^{(7–2)}) at 2011 Rome 1R
(United States) Frances Tiafoe	10	1	1	0	100%	Won (7–5, 3–6, 6–2) at 2015 Fairfield SF
(Spain) Pablo Carreño Busta	10	2	1	1	50%	Won (7–6^{(7–5)}, 6–3) at 2014 Hamburg 1R
(Latvia) Ernests Gulbis	10	1	0	1	0%	Lost (6–7^{(4–7)}, 4–6) at 2012 Orléans 2R
Total		69	26	43	38%	* Statistics correct as of u=31 December 2024

== Top 10 wins per season ==
- Brown has a 5–12 record against players who were, at the time the match was played, ranked in the top 10.

Season	2002–2013	2014	2015	2016	2017	2018	2019	2020	2021	Total
Wins	0	2	1	0	1	0	1	0	0	5

#	Player	Rank	Event	Surface	Rd	Score	Rank
2014
1.	(United States) John Isner	9	Houston, United States	Clay	2R	6–4, 6–7^{(7–9)}, 7–6^{(7–4)}	101
2.	(Spain) Rafael Nadal	1	Halle, Germany	Grass	2R	6–4, 6–1	85
2015
3.	(Spain) Rafael Nadal	10	Wimbledon, United Kingdom	Grass	2R	7–5, 3–6, 6–4, 6–4	115
2017
4.	(Croatia) Marin Čilić	7	Montpellier, France	Hard (i)	2R	6–4, 6–4	84
2019
5.	(Germany) Alexander Zverev	5	Stuttgart, Germany	Grass	2R	6–4, 6–7^{(3–7)}, 6–3	170
