= 2014 Open de Guadeloupe – Doubles =

Doubles
- 2014 Open de Guadeloupe

Final
- Champion: (Poland) Tomasz Bednarek (Canada) Adil Shamasdin
- Runner-up: (Germany) Gero Kretschmer (New Zealand) Michael Venus
- Score: 7–5, 6–7^{(5–7)}, [10–8]

Events
Singles	Doubles
← 2013 ·	Open de Guadeloupe	· 2015 →

Dudi Sela and Jimmy Wang were the defending champions but decided not to compete.

Tomasz Bednarek and Adil Shamasdin won the title, defeating Gero Kretschmer and Michael Venus in the final, 7–5, 6–7^{(5–7)}, [10–8].

== Seeds ==
1. (Germany) Gero Kretschmer / (New Zealand) Michael Venus (final)
2. (Australia) Paul Hanley / (Brazil) André Sá (semifinals)
3. (Poland) Tomasz Bednarek / (Canada) Adil Shamasdin (champions)
4. (United States) James Cerretani / (Sweden) Andreas Siljeström (first round)

== Draw ==
=== Key ===
- Q = Qualifier
- WC = Wild card
- LL = Lucky loser
- Alt = Alternate
- SE = Special exempt
- PR = Protected ranking
- ITF = ITF entry
- JE = Junior exempt
- w/o = Walkover
- r = Retired
- d = Defaulted
- SR = Special ranking

=== Draw ===
First round
1	(Germany) G Kretschmer (New Zealand) M Venus	7	6
(Brazil) A Ghem (Venezuela) D Souto	5	3
(Italy) R Ghedin (Italy) C Grassi	4	6^{3}
(Spain) DM de la Nava (Spain) RR Hidalgo	6	7^{7}
4	(United States) J Cerretani (Sweden) A Siljeström	4	3
WC	(France) Rudy Coco (France) G Mina	6	6
(France) J Eysseric (France) F Martin	6	6^{3}	[10]
(Germany) B Becker (Venezuela) R Maytín	3	7^{7}	[6]
WC	(France) Tristan Meraut (France) Élie Rousset	4	1
(Italy) A Arnaboldi (Italy) T Fabbiano	6	6
(Czech Republic) J Mertl (United States) M Russell	5	3
3	(Poland) T Bednarek (Canada) A Shamasdin	7	6
(Argentina) R Olivo (Argentina) H Zeballos	6	6
(France) V Millot (Belgium) O Rochus	1	2
WC	(Netherlands) S Groen (France) C Lestienne	2	1
2	(Australia) P Hanley (Brazil) A Sá	6	6

Quarterfinals
1	(Germany) G Kretschmer (New Zealand) M Venus	w/o
(Spain) DM de la Nava (Spain) RR Hidalgo
WC	(France) R Coco (France) G Mina	6^{3}	2
(France) J Eysseric (France) F Martin	7^{7}	6
(Italy) A Arnaboldi (Italy) T Fabbiano	3	1
3	(Poland) T Bednarek (Canada) A Shamasdin	6	6
(Argentina) R Olivo (Argentina) H Zeballos
2	(Australia) P Hanley (Brazil) A Sá	w/o

Semifinals
1	(Germany) G Kretschmer (New Zealand) M Venus	7^{7}	7^{7}
(France) J Eysseric (France) F Martin	6^{5}	6^{5}
3	(Poland) T Bednarek (Canada) A Shamasdin	6	1	[10]
2	(Australia) P Hanley (Brazil) A Sá	4	6	[7]

Final
1	(Germany) G Kretschmer (New Zealand) M Venus	5	7^{7}	[8]
3	(Poland) T Bednarek (Canada) A Shamasdin	7	6^{5}	[10]
