= 2016 Open de Guadeloupe – Singles =

Singles
- 2016 Open de Guadeloupe

Final
- Champion: (Tunisia) Malek Jaziri
- Runner-up: (United States) Stefan Kozlov
- Score: 6–2, 6–4

Events
Singles	Doubles
← 2015 ·	Open de Guadeloupe	· 2018 →

Ruben Bemelmans was the defending champion, but decided not to defend his title.

Malek Jaziri won the title, defeating Stefan Kozlov 6–2, 6–4 in the final.

== Seeds ==
1. (United States) Rajeev Ram (quarterfinals)
2. (United States) Taylor Fritz (semifinals)
3. (Tunisia) Malek Jaziri (champion)
4. (United States) Austin Krajicek (first round)
5. (Japan) Tatsuma Ito (quarterfinals)
6. (Japan) Yoshihito Nishioka (semifinals)
7. (Colombia) Alejandro González (second round)
8. (Australia) John-Patrick Smith (first round)

== Draw ==
=== Key ===
- Q = Qualifier
- WC = Wild card
- LL = Lucky loser
- Alt = Alternate
- SE = Special exempt
- PR = Protected ranking
- ITF = ITF entry
- JE = Junior exempt
- w/o = Walkover
- r = Retired
- d = Defaulted
- SR = Special ranking

=== Finals ===
Semifinals
6	(Japan) Yoshihito Nishioka	6	5	3
Alt	(United States) Stefan Kozlov	3	7	6
3	(Tunisia) Malek Jaziri	6^{5}	6	7
2	(United States) Taylor Fritz	7^{7}	4	5

Final
Alt	(United States) Stefan Kozlov	2	4
3	(Tunisia) Malek Jaziri	6	6

=== Top half ===
First round
1/WC	(United States) R Ram	6	7^{7}
Q	(Ecuador) E Gómez	4	6^{5}
WC	(Canada) F Auger-Aliassime	6	3	1^{r}
WC	(France) G Mina	2	6	3
(Serbia) N Milojević	4	7^{7}	4
Q	(Poland) H Hurkacz	6	6^{5}	6
(United States) M Krueger	5	6^{2}
6	(Japan) Y Nishioka	7	7^{7}
4	(United States) A Krajicek	3	4
Alt	(United States) S Kozlov	6	6
(France) Adrien Puget	6^{4}	7^{9}	1
(France) C Lestienne	7^{7}	6^{7}	6
(France) V Millot	6	3	6
(France) M Janvier	4	6	2
PR	(Canada) P Polansky	3	5
7	(Colombia) A González	6	7

Second round
1/WC	(United States) R Ram	3	6	6
WC	(France) G Mina	6	3	2
Q	(Poland) H Hurkacz	0	2
6	(Japan) Y Nishioka	6	6
Alt	(United States) S Kozlov	6	3	6
(France) C Lestienne	2	6	1
(France) V Millot	6	4	7^{7}
7	(Colombia) A González	2	6	6^{5}

Quarterfinals
1/WC	(United States) R Ram	2	2
6	(Japan) Y Nishioka	6	6
Alt	(United States) S Kozlov	5	7	6
(France) V Millot	7	5	2

Semifinals
6	(Japan) Y Nishioka	6	5	3
Alt	(United States) S Kozlov	3	7	6

=== Bottom half ===
First round
8	(Australia) J-P Smith	7^{7}	5	6^{7}
(Brazil) T Monteiro	6^{3}	7	7^{9}
(Australia) O Jasika	6	7^{8}
(Brazil) J Souza	1	6^{6}
(El Salvador) M Arévalo	7^{7}	6
WC	(France) G Jacq	6^{4}	4
(Czech Republic) M Michalička	2	4
3	(Tunisia) M Jaziri	6	6
5	(Japan) T Ito	6	6^{5}	6
Q	(Belgium) Julien Dubail	2	7^{7}	4
(Canada) P Bester	4	6^{0}
(Brazil) A Ghem	6	7^{7}
Alt	(Chile) G Lama	7	6
Q	(Chile) Jorge Montero	5	4
(Belgium) Y Mertens	4	3
2	(United States) T Fritz	6	6

Second round
(Brazil) T Monteiro	6	6^{4}	6
(Australia) O Jasika	4	7^{7}	3
(El Salvador) M Arévalo	4	4
3	(Tunisia) M Jaziri	6	6
5	(Japan) T Ito	7^{7}	6
(Brazil) A Ghem	6^{2}	2
Alt	(Chile) G Lama	7^{11}	4	6^{10}
2	(United States) T Fritz	6^{9}	6	7^{12}

Quarterfinals
(Brazil) T Monteiro	2	6	5
3	(Tunisia) M Jaziri	6	4	7
5	(Japan) T Ito	7^{7}	4	4
2	(United States) T Fritz	6^{3}	6	6

Semifinals
3	(Tunisia) M Jaziri	6^{5}	6	7
2	(United States) T Fritz	7^{7}	4	5
