= 2015 Open de Guadeloupe – Singles =

Singles
- 2015 Open de Guadeloupe

Final
- Champion: (Belgium) Ruben Bemelmans
- Runner-up: (France) Édouard Roger-Vasselin
- Score: 7–6^{(8–6)}, 6–3

Events
| Singles | Doubles |
| ← 2014 · | Open de Guadeloupe | · 2016 → |

Steve Johnson was the defending champion, but did not participate.

Ruben Bemelmans defeated Édouard Roger-Vasselin in the final, 7–6^{(8–6)}, 6–3, to win the title.

== Seeds ==
1. (Cyprus) Marcos Baghdatis (second round)
2. (Spain) Pablo Andújar (first round, retired)
3. (France) Benoît Paire (quarterfinals)
4. (Argentina) Máximo González (second round)
5. (South Korea) Chung Hyeon (first round)
6. (Slovakia) Norbert Gombos (second round)
7. (France) Kenny de Schepper (second round)
8. (France) Nicolas Mahut (first round)

== Draw ==
=== Key ===
- Q = Qualifier
- WC = Wild card
- LL = Lucky loser
- Alt = Alternate
- SE = Special exempt
- PR = Protected ranking
- ITF = ITF entry
- JE = Junior exempt
- w/o = Walkover
- r = Retired
- d = Defaulted
- SR = Special ranking

=== Finals ===
Semifinals
(France) Édouard Roger-Vasselin | 6 | 6
(United Kingdom) Kyle Edmund | 2 | 3
(Belgium) Ruben Bemelmans | 6 | 6
Q | (Brazil) Henrique Cunha | 0 | 2

Final
(France) Édouard Roger-Vasselin | 6^{6} | 3
(Belgium) Ruben Bemelmans | 7^{8} | 6

=== Top half ===
First round
1 | (Cyprus) M Baghdatis | 7 | 7^{7}
(Barbados) D King | 5 | 6^{3}
(France) Jules Marie | 6^{5} | 1
(France) E Roger-Vasselin | 7^{7} | 6
(Portugal) G Elias | 6^{10} | 3
(Argentina) M Trungelliti | 7^{12} | 6
Q | (Australia) O Jasika | 6 | 2 | 6
5 | (South Korea) H Chung | 3 | 6 | 4
3 | (France) B Paire | 6 | 6
Q | (Netherlands) M Middelkoop | 4 | 4
Q | (Netherlands) W Koolhof | 3 | 3
(Czech Republic) J Hernych | 6 | 6
(United Kingdom) K Edmund | 6 | 6^{3} | 6
WC | (France) F Martin | 4 | 7^{7} | 4
(United States) M Krueger | 4 | 1
7 | (France) K de Schepper | 6 | 6

Second round
1 | (Cyprus) M Baghdatis | 2 | 2
(France) E Roger-Vasselin | 6 | 6
(Argentina) M Trungelliti | 4 | 4
Q | (Australia) O Jasika | 6 | 6
3 | (France) B Paire | 4 | 6 | 7^{11}
(Czech Republic) J Hernych | 6 | 2 | 6^{9}
(United Kingdom) K Edmund | 6 | 7
7 | (France) K de Schepper | 4 | 5

Quarterfinals
(France) E Roger-Vasselin | 6 | 6
Q | (Australia) O Jasika | 4 | 2
3 | (France) B Paire | 6 | 2 | 3
(United Kingdom) K Edmund | 3 | 6 | 6

Semifinals
(France) E Roger-Vasselin | 6 | 6
(United Kingdom) K Edmund | 2 | 3

=== Bottom half ===
First round
8 | (France) N Mahut | 6^{6} | 3
(Belgium) R Bemelmans | 7^{8} | 6
WC | (France) Laurent Rochette | 7^{7} | 6
WC | (France) C Hemery | 6^{3} | 1
Alt | (Slovakia) F Horanský | 2 | 4
(Brazil) A Ghem | 6 | 6
(United States) B Fratangelo | 3 | 5
4 | (Argentina) M González | 6 | 7
6 | (Slovakia) N Gombos | 6 | 7^{7}
WC | (France) G Barrère | 3 | 6^{3}
(Netherlands) A van der Duim | 6^{2} | 4
(Australia) J-P Smith | 7^{7} | 6
Q | (Brazil) Henrique Cunha | 3 | 6 | 6
(France) G Mina | 6 | 3 | 3
Alt | (Slovakia) I Klec | 7^{7} | 1
2 | (Spain) P Andújar | 6^{2} | 0^{r}

Second round
(Belgium) R Bemelmans | 7^{7} | 6
WC | (France) L Rochette | 6^{0} | 3
(Brazil) A Ghem | 6 | 3 | 7
4 | (Argentina) M González | 0 | 6 | 5
6 | (Slovakia) N Gombos | 6 | 4 | 1
(Australia) J-P Smith | 3 | 6 | 6
Q | (Brazil) H Cunha | 7^{7} | 6
Alt | (Slovakia) I Klec | 6^{3} | 2

Quarterfinals
(Belgium) R Bemelmans | 6 | 6
(Brazil) A Ghem | 3 | 2
(Australia) J-P Smith | 4 | 4
Q | (Brazil) H Cunha | 6 | 6

Semifinals
(Belgium) R Bemelmans | 6 | 6
Q | (Brazil) H Cunha | 0 | 2
