= 2012 Orange Open Guadeloupe – Doubles =

Doubles
- 2012 Orange Open Guadeloupe

Final
- Champions: (France) Pierre-Hugues Herbert (France) Albano Olivetti
- Runners-up: (Australia) Paul Hanley (Australia) Jordan Kerr
- Score: 7–5, 1–6, [10–7]

Events
Singles	Doubles
← 2011 ·	Orange Open Guadeloupe	· 2013 →

Riccardo Ghedin and Stéphane Robert were the defending champions but decided not to participate.
Pierre-Hugues Herbert and Albano Olivetti defeated Paul Hanley and Jordan Kerr 7–5, 1–6, [10–7] in the final to win the title.

== Seeds ==
1. (Germany) Martin Emmrich / (Sweden) Andreas Siljeström (first round)
2. (United States) James Cerretani / (United States) John Paul Fruttero (quarterfinals)
3. (Australia) Paul Hanley / (Australia) Jordan Kerr (final)
4. (Russia) Mikhail Elgin / (Russia) Alexander Kudryavtsev (semifinals)

== Draw ==
=== Key ===
- Q = Qualifier
- WC = Wild card
- LL = Lucky loser
- Alt = Alternate
- SE = Special exempt
- PR = Protected ranking
- ITF = ITF entry
- JE = Junior exempt
- w/o = Walkover
- r = Retired
- d = Defaulted
- SR = Special ranking

=== Draw ===
First round
1	(Germany) M Emmrich (Sweden) A Siljeström	6	6^{3}	[9]
(France) P-H Herbert (France) A Olivetti	4	7^{7}	[11]
WC	(France) G Mina (France) Julien Obry	7^{7}	1	[3]
(Slovakia) I Klec (France) B Paire	6^{3}	6	[10]
4	(Russia) M Elgin (Russia) A Kudryavtsev	6	6
(Brazil) R Dutra da Silva (United States) M Russell	3	1
(Spain) A Brugués-Davi (Portugal) G Elias	6^{6}	4
(Japan) Y Sugita (Slovenia) G Žemlja	7^{8}	6
(France) A Clément (Czech Republic) L Dlouhý	6	4	[10]
(Canada) P-L Duclos (Canada) V Pospisil	1	6	[6]
WC	(Ukraine) S Bubka (Germany) M Zverev	1	3
3	(Australia) P Hanley (Australia) J Kerr	6	6
(Germany) B Becker (Germany) M Kohlmann	6	7^{7}
WC	(France) Rudy Coco (France) J Ouanna	3	6^{3}
(Poland) T Bednarek (France) O Charroin	6^{5}	6	[8]
2	(United States) J Cerretani (United States) JP Fruttero	7^{7}	3	[10]

Quarterfinals
(France) P-H Herbert (France) A Olivetti	6	7
(Slovakia) I Klec (France) B Paire	0	5
4	(Russia) M Elgin (Russia) A Kudryavtsev	6	6
(Japan) Y Sugita (Slovenia) G Žemlja	3	0
(France) A Clément (Czech Republic) L Dlouhý	3	5
3	(Australia) P Hanley (Australia) J Kerr	6	7
(Germany) B Becker (Germany) M Kohlmann	4	6	[10]
2	(United States) J Cerretani (United States) JP Fruttero	6	4	[8]

Semifinals
(France) P-H Herbert (France) A Olivetti	6	6
4	(Russia) M Elgin (Russia) A Kudryavtsev	3	2
3	(Australia) P Hanley (Australia) J Kerr	6	6
(Germany) B Becker (Germany) M Kohlmann	3	4

Final
(France) P-H Herbert (France) A Olivetti	7	1	[10]
3	(Australia) P Hanley (Australia) J Kerr	5	6	[7]
