= 2018 Open de Guadeloupe – Singles =

Singles
- 2018 Open de Guadeloupe

Final
- Champion: (Serbia) Dušan Lajović
- Runner-up: (United States) Denis Kudla
- Score: 6–4, 6–0

Events
Singles	Doubles
← 2016 ·	Open de Guadeloupe

Malek Jaziri was the defending champion but chose not to defend his title.

Dušan Lajović won the title after defeating Denis Kudla 6–4, 6–0 in the final.

== Seeds ==
1. (Greece) Stefanos Tsitsipas (second round)
2. (Portugal) Gastão Elias (second round)
3. (Serbia) Dušan Lajović (champion)
4. (Belgium) Ruben Bemelmans (semifinals)
5. (Canada) Peter Polansky (second round)
6. (United States) Denis Kudla (final)
7. (France) Calvin Hemery (quarterfinals)
8. (United States) Bradley Klahn (quarterfinals)

== Draw ==
=== Key ===
- Q = Qualifier
- WC = Wild card
- LL = Lucky loser
- Alt = Alternate
- SE = Special exempt
- PR = Protected ranking
- ITF = ITF entry
- JE = Junior exempt
- w/o = Walkover
- r = Retired
- d = Defaulted
- SR = Special ranking

=== Finals ===
Semifinals
(Chile) Christian Garín	2	2
3/WC	(Serbia) Dušan Lajović	6	6
4	(Belgium) Ruben Bemelmans	2	6^{6}
6	(United States) Denis Kudla	6	7^{8}

Final
3/WC	(Serbia) Dušan Lajović	6	6
6	(United States) Denis Kudla	4	0

=== Top half ===
First round
1/WC	(Greece) S Tsitsipas	6	6
WC	(France) C Denolly	3	3
(Chile) C Garín	4	6	7^{7}
(Croatia) V Galović	6	2	6^{3}
(Australia) J-P Smith	7	4
(Australia) A Santillan	5	3^{r}
Q	(France) Laurent Rochette	0	5
5	(Canada) P Polansky	6	7
3/WC	(Serbia) D Lajović	6	6
(France) B Bonzi	3	3
(Barbados) D King	6^{5}	6	6
Q	(France) Tom Jomby	7^{7}	1	2
(United States) C Harrison	6	6
WC	(France) G Mina	4	2
(United Kingdom) A Ward	2	0
8	(United States) B Klahn	6	6

Second round
1/WC	(Greece) S Tsitsipas	6^{4}	5
(Chile) C Garín	7^{7}	7
(Australia) J-P Smith	7^{7}	6
5	(Canada) P Polansky	6^{3}	3
3/WC	(Serbia) D Lajović	6	6
(Barbados) D King	3	4
(United States) C Harrison	6	6^{4}	4
8	(United States) B Klahn	3	7^{7}	6

Quarterfinals
(Chile) C Garín	7	7^{8}
(Australia) J-P Smith	5	6^{6}
3/WC	(Serbia) D Lajović	7^{7}	2	6
8	(United States) B Klahn	6^{5}	6	3

Semifinals
(Chile) C Garín	2	2
3/WC	(Serbia) D Lajović	6	6

=== Bottom half ===
First round
7	(France) C Hemery	6	4
(Argentina) R Olivo	3	1^{r}
Q	(Belgium) S Gillé	4	0
Alt	(Japan) K Uchida	6	6
Q	(United States) Evan Song	7	7^{7}
(Canada) B Schnur	5	6^{1}
(Belgium) Y Mertens	5	1
4	(Belgium) R Bemelmans	7	6
6	(United States) D Kudla	7^{7}	2	6
(France) M Bourgue	6^{1}	6	1
PR	(Colombia) S Giraldo	2	6	6^{9}
(Croatia) A Pavić	6	3	7^{11}
Alt	(United Kingdom) L Glasspool	4	1
(Canada) F Peliwo	6	6
(United States) D Novikov	6^{8}	4
2	(Portugal) G Elias	7^{10}	6

Second round
7	(France) C Hemery	2	7	7
Alt	(Japan) K Uchida	6	5	5
Q	(United States) E Song	4	4
4	(Belgium) R Bemelmans	6	6
6	(United States) D Kudla	6	6
(Croatia) A Pavić	1	1
(Canada) F Peliwo	6	7
2	(Portugal) G Elias	4	5

Quarterfinals
7	(France) C Hemery	2	4
4	(Belgium) R Bemelmans	6	6
6	(United States) D Kudla	6	6
(Canada) F Peliwo	3	4

Semifinals
4	(Belgium) R Bemelmans	2	6^{6}
6	(United States) D Kudla	6	7^{8}
