= 2015 Open de Guadeloupe – Doubles =

Doubles
- 2015 Open de Guadeloupe

Final
- Champions: (United States) James Cerretani (Netherlands) Antal van der Duim
- Runners-up: (Netherlands) Wesley Koolhof (Netherlands) Matwé Middelkoop
- Score: 6–1, 6–3

Events
Singles	Doubles
← 2014 ·	Open de Guadeloupe	· 2016 →

Tomasz Bednarek and Adil Shamasdin were the defending champions, but did not participate.

James Cerretani and Antal van der Duim claimed the title, defeating Wesley Koolhof and Matwé Middelkoop in the final by a score of 6–1, 6–3.

== Seeds ==
1. (France) Nicolas Mahut / (France) Édouard Roger-Vasselin (withdrew)
2. (Germany) Martin Emmrich / (Sweden) Andreas Siljeström (first round)
3. (Argentina) Máximo González / (Venezuela) Roberto Maytín (semifinals)
4. (France) Fabrice Martin / (India) Purav Raja (first round)

== Draw ==
=== Key ===
- Q = Qualifier
- WC = Wild card
- LL = Lucky loser
- Alt = Alternate
- ITF = ITF entry
- PR = Protected ranking
- SR = Special ranking
- SE = Special exempt
- JE = Junior exempt
- JR = Junior Accelerator Programme entrant
- CO = College Accelerator Programme entrant
- NG = Next Gen Accelerator Program entrant
- w/o = Walkover
- r = Retired
- d = Defaulted

First round
1	(France) N Mahut (France) E Roger-Vasselin	w/o
(United States) J Cerretani (Netherlands) A van der Duim
(Spain) P Andújar (Brazil) F Romboli	7	6
(Portugal) G Elias (Brazil) A Ghem	5	3
4	(France) F Martin (India) P Raja	6	6^{5}	[6]
(United States) B Fratangelo (United States) M Krueger	4	7^{7}	[10]
(Sweden) J Brunström (Czech Republic) J Hernych	4
(Slovakia) F Horanský (Barbados) D King	4^{r}
(France) G Mina (Argentina) M Trungelliti	6	6
WC	(Guadeloupe) Nicolas Ancedy (France) Victor Girat Magin	2	4
(Slovakia) I Klec (France) B Paire	3	3
3	(Argentina) M González (Venezuela) R Maytín	6	6
(Republic of Ireland) J Cluskey (Australia) J-P Smith	6	6
(France) Jules Marie (France) Laurent Rochette	1	4
(Netherlands) W Koolhof (Netherlands) M Middelkoop	6	6
2	(Germany) M Emmrich (Sweden) A Siljeström	4	4

Quarterfinals
(United States) J Cerretani (Netherlands) A van der Duim
(Spain) P Andújar (Brazil) F Romboli	w/o
(United States) B Fratangelo (United States) M Krueger	2	2
(Sweden) J Brunström (Czech Republic) J Hernych	6	6
(France) G Mina (Argentina) M Trungelliti	2	7^{7}	[7]
3	(Argentina) M González (Venezuela) R Maytín	6	6^{5}	[10]
(Republic of Ireland) J Cluskey (Australia) J-P Smith	7^{7}	1	[10]
(Netherlands) W Koolhof (Netherlands) M Middelkoop	6^{4}	6	[12]

Semifinals
(United States) J Cerretani (Netherlands) A van der Duim	6	6
(Sweden) J Brunström (Czech Republic) J Hernych	3	2
3	(Argentina) M González (Venezuela) R Maytín	5	0
(Netherlands) W Koolhof (Netherlands) M Middelkoop	7	6

Final
(United States) J Cerretani (Netherlands) A van der Duim	6	6
(Netherlands) W Koolhof (Netherlands) M Middelkoop	1	3
