= 2011 Orange Open Guadeloupe – Singles =

Singles
- 2011 Orange Open Guadeloupe

Final
- Champion: (Belgium) Olivier Rochus
- Runner-up: (France) Stéphane Robert
- Score: 6–2, 6–3

Events
Singles	Doubles
Orange Open Guadeloupe	· 2012 →

This was the first edition of the tournament.

Olivier Rochus won the final 6–2, 6–3 against Stéphane Robert.

== Seeds ==
1. (Finland) Jarkko Nieminen (semifinals)
2. (Italy) Fabio Fognini (second round)
3. (Spain) Daniel Gimeno-Traver (second round)
4. (Germany) Tobias Kamke (second round)
5. (Spain) Pablo Andújar (second round)
6. (Spain) Rubén Ramírez Hidalgo (second round)
7. (Portugal) Frederico Gil (quarterfinals)
8. (Italy) Simone Bolelli (second round)

== Draw ==
=== Key ===
- Q = Qualifier
- WC = Wild card
- LL = Lucky loser
- Alt = Alternate
- SE = Special exempt
- PR = Protected ranking
- ITF = ITF entry
- JE = Junior exempt
- w/o = Walkover
- r = Retired
- d = Defaulted
- SR = Special ranking

=== Finals ===
Semifinals
1/WC	(Finland) Jarkko Nieminen	4	3
(France) Stéphane Robert	6	6
(Belgium) Olivier Rochus	6	6
(Portugal) Gastão Elias	3	3

Final
(France) Stéphane Robert	2	3
(Belgium) Olivier Rochus	6	6

=== Top half ===
First round
(Italy) F Cipolla	6	6
(Italy) R Ghedin	3	1
Alt	(France) M Rodrigues	6^{2}	6	2
WC	(France) G Mina	7	4	6
Alt	(Canada) P-L Duclos	2	4
(Turkey) M İlhan	6	6
(France) S Robert	6	5	7
(Germany) D Brown	2	7	6^{3}

Second round
1/WC	(Finland) J Nieminen	6	6
(Italy) F Cipolla	3	3
WC	(France) G Mina	6^{4}	1
7	(Portugal) F Gil	7	6
4	(Germany) T Kamke	6^{4}	3
(Turkey) M İlhan	7	6
(France) S Robert	4	6	6
5	(Spain) P Andújar	6	1	4

Quarterfinals
1/WC	(Finland) J Nieminen	6	6
7	(Portugal) F Gil	2	4
(Turkey) M İlhan	3	2
(France) S Robert	6	6

Semifinals
1/WC	(Finland) J Nieminen	4	3
(France) S Robert	6	6

=== Bottom half ===
First round
(Belgium) O Rochus	7	6
(Spain) I Navarro	6^{1}	2
(Czech Republic) L Rosol	6	6
(France) A Clément	4	2
(Germany) J Reister	2	6	3
(Portugal) G Elias	6	3	6
(Switzerland) S Bohli	7	6
(France) V Millot	5	2

Second round
6	(Spain) R Ramírez Hidalgo	3	1
(Belgium) O Rochus	6	6
(Czech Republic) L Rosol	7	6
3/WC	(Spain) D Gimeno-Traver	6^{2}	1
8	(Italy) S Bolelli	6	2	5
(Portugal) G Elias	4	6	7
(Switzerland) S Bohli	6	7
2/WC	(Italy) F Fognini	3	6^{3}

Quarterfinals
(Belgium) O Rochus	6	2	7
(Czech Republic) L Rosol	3	6	6^{5}
(Portugal) G Elias	6^{5}	6	6
(Switzerland) S Bohli	7	0	3

Semifinals
(Belgium) O Rochus	6	6
(Portugal) G Elias	3	3
