= 2013 Orange Open Guadeloupe – Doubles =

Doubles
- 2013 Orange Open Guadeloupe

Final
- Champions: (Israel) Dudi Sela (Chinese Taipei) Jimmy Wang
- Runners-up: (Germany) Philipp Marx (Romania) Florin Mergea
- Score: 6–1, 6–2

Events
Singles	Doubles
← 2012 ·	Orange Open Guadeloupe	· 2014 →

Pierre-Hugues Herbert and Albano Olivetti were the defending champions but decided not to participate.
Dudi Sela and Jimmy Wang won the final 6–1, 6–2 against Philipp Marx and Florin Mergea to win the title.

== Seeds ==
1. (France) Benoît Paire / (France) Édouard Roger-Vasselin (quarterfinals)
2. (Germany) Philipp Marx / (Romania) Florin Mergea (final)
3. (United Kingdom) Jamie Murray / (Australia) John Peers (quarterfinals)
4. (United States) James Cerretani / (Canada) Adil Shamasdin (quarterfinals)

== Draw ==
=== Key ===
- Q = Qualifier
- WC = Wild card
- LL = Lucky loser
- Alt = Alternate
- SE = Special exempt
- PR = Protected ranking
- ITF = ITF entry
- JE = Junior exempt
- w/o = Walkover
- r = Retired
- d = Defaulted
- SR = Special ranking

=== Draw ===
First round
(United States) A Kuznetsov (Germany) M Zverev	6	6
(Sweden) Lucas Renard (France) Jean-Baptiste Vivies	2	2
4	(United States) J Cerretani (Canada) A Shamasdin	6^{5}	6	[10]
(Moldova) R Borvanov (United States) G Ouellette	7^{7}	2	[6]
(Germany) C-M Stebe (Germany) J-L Struff	1	7	7
(Israel) D Sela (Chinese Taipei) J Wang	6	5	[10]
(Chile) C Garín (Chile) G Lama	1	3
(Netherlands) J Huta Galung (Czech Republic) L Rosol	6	6
(Ukraine) D Molchanov (Ukraine) S Stakhovsky	5	6	[5]
3	(United Kingdom) J Murray (Australia) J Peers	7	4	[10]
(France) M Gicquel (France) N Renavand	6	7
(Australia) J Kerr (Sweden) A Siljeström	2	5

Quarterfinals
1	(France) B Paire (France) É Roger-Vasselin	4	6	[7]
(United States) A Kuznetsov (Germany) M Zverev	6	3	[10]
4	(United States) J Cerretani (Canada) A Shamasdin	1	3
(Israel) D Sela (Chinese Taipei) J Wang	6	6
(Netherlands) J Huta Galung (Czech Republic) L Rosol	6	7^{8}
3	(United Kingdom) J Murray (Australia) J Peers	3	6^{6}
(France) M Gicquel (France) N Renavand	3	4
2	(Germany) P Marx (Romania) F Mergea	6	6

Semifinals
(United States) A Kuznetsov (Germany) M Zverev	4	1
(Israel) D Sela (Chinese Taipei) J Wang	6	6
(Netherlands) J Huta Galung (Czech Republic) L Rosol	2	3
2	(Germany) P Marx (Romania) F Mergea	6	6

Final
(Israel) D Sela (Chinese Taipei) J Wang	6	6
2	(Germany) P Marx (Romania) F Mergea	1	2
