= 2013 Orange Open Guadeloupe – Singles =

Singles
- 2013 Orange Open Guadeloupe

Final
- Champion: (France) Benoît Paire
- Runner-up: (Ukraine) Sergiy Stakhovsky
- Score: 6–4, 5–7, 6–4

Events
Singles	Doubles
← 2012 ·	Orange Open Guadeloupe	· 2014 →

David Goffin was the defending champion but decided to participate at the 2013 Sony Open Tennis instead.
Benoît Paire won the final 6–4, 5–7, 6–4 against Sergiy Stakhovsky to win the title.

== Seeds ==
1. (France) Benoît Paire (champion)
2. (Czech Republic) Lukáš Rosol (semifinals)
3. (Luxembourg) Gilles Müller (quarterfinals)
4. (Slovakia) Lukáš Lacko (quarterfinals)
5. (Ukraine) Sergiy Stakhovsky (final)
6. (Germany) Matthias Bachinger (semifinals)
7. (Germany) Jan-Lennard Struff (second round)
8. (France) Marc Gicquel (second round)

== Draw ==
=== Key ===
- Q = Qualifier
- WC = Wild card
- LL = Lucky loser
- Alt = Alternate
- SE = Special exempt
- PR = Protected ranking
- ITF = ITF entry
- JE = Junior exempt
- w/o = Walkover
- r = Retired
- d = Defaulted
- SR = Special ranking

=== Finals ===
Semifinals
1/WC	(France) Benoît Paire	3	6	6
6	(Germany) Matthias Bachinger	6	1	3
5	(Ukraine) Sergiy Stakhovsky	2	6	7
2	(Czech Republic) Lukáš Rosol	6	4	5

Final
1/WC	(France) Benoît Paire	6	5	6
5	(Ukraine) Sergiy Stakhovsky	4	7	4

=== Top half ===
First round
1/WC	(France) B Paire	4	6	6
WC	(France) C Hemery	6	3	2
(United States) A Kuznetsov	3	3
(Ukraine) D Molchanov	6	6
Q	(India) P Amritraj	6	6
(United Kingdom) J Baker	4	4
(France) N Renavand	4	4
8	(France) M Gicquel	6	6
4	(Slovakia) L Lacko	0	6	2
(Germany) M Zverev	6	3	0^{r}
(Belgium) O Rochus	6	6
(Chinese Taipei) J Wang	4	3
(Netherlands) J Huta Galung	1	3
(Germany) M Berrer	6	6
Q	(Chile) G Lama	1	2
6	(Germany) M Bachinger	6	6

Second round
1/WC	(France) B Paire	6	5	6
(Ukraine) D Molchanov	4	7	2
Q	(India) P Amritraj	7	7^{7}
8	(France) M Gicquel	5	6^{5}
4	(Slovakia) L Lacko	7^{7}	6
(Belgium) O Rochus	6^{5}	2
(Germany) M Berrer	2	3
6	(Germany) M Bachinger	6	6

Quarterfinals
1/WC	(France) B Paire	6	6
Q	(India) P Amritraj	2	2
4	(Slovakia) L Lacko	1	4
6	(Germany) M Bachinger	6	6

Semifinals
1/WC	(France) B Paire	3	6	6
6	(Germany) M Bachinger	6	1	3

=== Bottom half ===
First round
5	(Ukraine) S Stakhovsky	6	6
(Republic of Ireland) J McGee	4	4
(France) F Serra	7^{8}	6
Q	(Australia) J Peers	6^{6}	2
(Japan) H Moriya	4	3
(Japan) Y Sugita	6	6
(Germany) C-M Stebe	5	5
3	(Luxembourg) G Müller	7	7
7	(Germany) J-L Struff	3	6	6
WC	(France) Julien Obry	6	3	2
(Israel) D Sela	6	6
(France) A Mannarino	2	3
WC	(Belgium) K Coppejans	6^{2}	2
(Romania) M Copil	7^{7}	6
Q	(Moldova) R Borvanov	7	1	0
2	(Czech Republic) L Rosol	5	6	6

Second round
5	(Ukraine) S Stakhovsky	6	7^{7}
(France) F Serra	3	6^{1}
(Japan) Y Sugita	3	2
3	(Luxembourg) G Müller	6	6
7	(Germany) J-L Struff	5	6	2
(Israel) D Sela	7	0	6
(Romania) M Copil	3	1^{r}
2	(Czech Republic) L Rosol	6	1

Quarterfinals
5	(Ukraine) S Stakhovsky	7^{11}	6
3	(Luxembourg) G Müller	6^{9}	3
(Israel) D Sela	5	6	4
2	(Czech Republic) L Rosol	7	2	6

Semifinals
5	(Ukraine) S Stakhovsky	2	6	7
2	(Czech Republic) L Rosol	6	4	5
