= 2014 Open de Guadeloupe =

- Date: 31 March – 6 April
- Edition: 4th
- Draw: 32S / 16D
- Prize money: $100,000+H
- Surface: Hard
- Location: Le Gosier, Guadeloupe

Champions

Singles
- (United States) Steve Johnson

Doubles
- (Poland) Tomasz Bednarek / (Canada) Adil Shamasdin
← 2013 ·	Open de Guadeloupe	· 2015 →

The 2014 Open de Guadeloupe was a professional tennis tournament played on hard courts. It was the fourth edition of the tournament which was part of the 2014 ATP Challenger Tour. It took place in Le Gosier, Guadeloupe between 31 March and 6 April 2014.

== Singles main-draw entrants ==
=== Seeds ===
Country	Player	Rank	Seed
FRA	Kenny de Schepper	66	1
GER	Benjamin Becker	93	2
USA	Steve Johnson	101	3
USA	Michael Russell	107	4
ARG	Horacio Zeballos	125	5
USA	Denis Kudla	126	6
BEL	Ruben Bemelmans	161	7
ESP	Rubén Ramírez Hidalgo	165	8

=== Other entrants ===
The following players received wildcards into the singles main draw:

- (France) Constant Lestienne
- (France) Rudy Coco

The following players received entry from the qualifying draw:

- (France) Elie Rousset
- (Argentina) Mateo Nicolás Martínez
- (New Zealand) Michael Venus
- (Italy) Claudio Grassi

== Doubles main-draw entrants ==
=== Seeds ===
Country	Player	Country	Player	Rank	Seed
GER	Gero Kretschmer	NZL	Michael Venus	163	1
AUS	Paul Hanley	BRA	André Sá	168	2
POL	Tomasz Bednarek	CAN	Adil Shamasdin	196	3
USA	James Cerretani	SWE	Andreas Siljeström	238	4

=== Other entrants ===
The following pairs received wildcards into the doubles main draw:

- (France) Rudy Coco / (France) Gianni Mina
- (France) Tristan Meraut / (France) Elie Rousset
- (Netherlands) Sander Groen / (France) Constant Lestienne

== Champions ==
=== Singles ===
- (United States) Steve Johnson def. (France) Kenny de Schepper, 6–1, 6–7^{(5–7)}, 7–6^{(7–2)}

=== Doubles ===
- (Poland) Tomasz Bednarek / (Canada) Adil Shamasdin def. (Germany) Gero Kretschmer / (New Zealand) Michael Venus, 7–5, 6–7^{(5–7)}, [10–8]
