= 2012 Orange Open Guadeloupe – Singles =

Singles
- 2012 Orange Open Guadeloupe

Final
- Champion: (Belgium) David Goffin
- Runner-up: (Germany) Mischa Zverev
- Score: 6–2, 6–2

Events
Singles	Doubles
← 2011 ·	Orange Open Guadeloupe	· 2013 →

Olivier Rochus was the defending champion but lost in the semifinals.
David Goffin won the title, defeating Mischa Zverev 6–2, 6–2 in the final.

== Seeds ==
1. (Belgium) Olivier Rochus (semifinals)
2. (Chinese Taipei) Yen-Hsun Lu (first round, retired because of a left knee injury)
3. (United States) James Blake (second round)
4. (France) Édouard Roger-Vasselin (semifinals)
5. (Russia) Igor Kunitsyn (quarterfinals)
6. (France) Nicolas Mahut (withdrew because of a right wrist injury)
7. (Japan) Tatsuma Ito (first round)
8. (France) Benoît Paire (second round)
9. (Canada) Vasek Pospisil (first round, retired because of fatigue)

== Draw ==
=== Key ===
- Q = Qualifier
- WC = Wild card
- LL = Lucky loser
- Alt = Alternate
- SE = Special exempt
- PR = Protected ranking
- ITF = ITF entry
- JE = Junior exempt
- w/o = Walkover
- r = Retired
- d = Defaulted
- SR = Special ranking

=== Finals ===
Semifinals
1/WC	(Belgium) Olivier Rochus	4	4
Alt	(Germany) Mischa Zverev	6	6
4	(France) Édouard Roger-Vasselin	5	4
(Belgium) David Goffin	7	6

Final
Alt	(Germany) Mischa Zverev	2	2
(Belgium) David Goffin	6	6

=== Top half ===
First round
1/WC	(Belgium) O Rochus	6^{2}	6	6
(France) F Serra	7^{7}	4	2
WC	(France) J Ouanna	6	6
(Switzerland) M Chiudinelli	4	2
(Russia) A Kudryavtsev	4	3
Alt	(Portugal) G Elias	6	6
Q	(Slovakia) I Klec	4	7^{7}	3
9	(Canada) V Pospisil	6	6^{5}	2^{r}
3/WC	(United States) J Blake	2	7	7
Alt	(Canada) P-L Duclos	6	5	5
Alt	(Italy) T Fabbiano	2	3
Alt	(Germany) M Zverev	6	6
Q	(France) Julien Obry	6^{4}	5
WC	(France) G Mina	7^{7}	7
(Slovenia) G Žemlja	4	2
5	(Russia) I Kunitsyn	6	6

Second round
1/WC	(Belgium) O Rochus	7^{9}	7
WC	(France) J Ouanna	6^{7}	5
Alt	(Portugal) G Elias	3	2
Q	(Slovakia) I Klec	6	6
3/WC	(United States) J Blake	3	3
Alt	(Germany) M Zverev	6	6
WC	(France) G Mina	5	4
5	(Russia) I Kunitsyn	7	6

Quarterfinals
1/WC	(Belgium) O Rochus	6	6
Q	(Slovakia) I Klec	0	0
Alt	(Germany) M Zverev	6	6
5	(Russia) I Kunitsyn	4	0

Semifinals
1/WC	(Belgium) O Rochus	4	4
Alt	(Germany) M Zverev	6	6

=== Bottom half ===
First round
7	(Japan) T Ito	1	6^{5}
Q	(France) P-H Herbert	6	7^{7}
(Brazil) R Dutra da Silva	4	2
(Germany) B Becker	6	6
Q	(United Kingdom) D Evans	6	6
(France) A Clément	4	4
SE	(Belgium) M Authom	4	5
4	(France) É Roger-Vasselin	6	7
8	(France) B Paire	6	6
Alt	(Ukraine) S Bubka	1	1
Alt	(Japan) Y Sugita	6	6
(Spain) A Brugués-Davi	1	4
(Belgium) D Goffin	7^{7}	6
(United States) M Russell	6^{5}	3
LL	(United Kingdom) A Ward	7^{10}
2	(Chinese Taipei) Y-H Lu	6^{8r}

Second round
Q	(France) P-H Herbert	0	2
(Germany) B Becker	6	6
Q	(United Kingdom) D Evans	3	2
4	(France) É Roger-Vasselin	6	6
8	(France) B Paire	6^{2}	6	4
Alt	(Japan) Y Sugita	7^{7}	2	6
(Belgium) D Goffin	6	3	7^{7}
LL	(United Kingdom) A Ward	2	6	6^{4}

Quarterfinals
(Germany) B Becker	6	6^{7}	5
4	(France) É Roger-Vasselin	4	7^{9}	7
Alt	(Japan) Y Sugita	0	2
(Belgium) D Goffin	6	6

Semifinals
4	(France) É Roger-Vasselin	5	4
(Belgium) D Goffin	7	6
