= 2015 Open de Guadeloupe =

- Date: 30 March – 5 April
- Edition: 5th
- Draw: 32S / 16D
- Prize money: $100,000+H
- Surface: Hard
- Location: Le Gosier, Guadeloupe

Champions

Singles
- (Belgium) Ruben Bemelmans

Doubles
- (United States) James Cerretani / (Netherlands) Antal van der Duim
← 2014 ·	Open de Guadeloupe	· 2016 →

The 2015 Open de Guadeloupe was a professional tennis tournament played on hard courts. It was the fifth edition of the tournament which was part of the 2015 ATP Challenger Tour. It took place in Le Gosier, Guadeloupe between 30 March and 5 April 2015.

== Singles main-draw entrants ==
=== Seeds ===
Country	Player	Rank^{1}	Seed
CYP	Marcos Baghdatis	58	1
ESP	Pablo Andújar	66	2
FRA	Benoît Paire	85	3
ARG	Máximo González	95	4
KOR	Chung Hyeon	121	5
SVK	Norbert Gombos	122	6
FRA	Kenny de Schepper	123	7
FRA	Nicolas Mahut	124	8

- ^{1} Rankings are as of 23 March 2015.

=== Other entrants ===
The following players received wildcards into the singles main draw:

- (France) Grégoire Barrère
- (France) Calvin Hemery
- (France) Fabrice Martin
- (France) Laurent Rochette

The following players got into the singles main draw as an alternate:

- (Slovakia) Filip Horanský
- (Slovakia) Ivo Klec

The following players received entry from the qualifying draw:

- (Brazil) Henrique Cunha
- (Australia) Omar Jasika
- (Netherlands) Wesley Koolhof
- (Netherlands) Matwé Middelkoop

== Doubles main-draw entrants ==
=== Seeds ===
Country	Player	Country	Player	Rank	Seed
FRA	Nicolas Mahut	FRA	Édouard Roger-Vasselin	29	1
GER	Martin Emmrich	SWE	Andreas Siljeström	187	2
ARG	Máximo González	VEN	Roberto Maytín	192	3
FRA	Fabrice Martin	IND	Purav Raja	217	4

=== Other entrants ===
The following pairs received wildcards into the doubles main draw:

- (France) Nicolas Ancedy / (France) Victor Girat Magin

== Champions ==
=== Singles ===
- (Belgium) Ruben Bemelmans def. (France) Édouard Roger-Vasselin, 7–6^{(8–6)}, 6–3

=== Doubles ===
- (United States) James Cerretani / (Netherlands) Antal van der Duim def. (Netherlands) Wesley Koolhof / (Netherlands) Matwé Middelkoop, 6–1, 6–3
