= 2016 Open de Guadeloupe – Doubles =

Doubles
- 2016 Open de Guadeloupe

Final
- Champion: (United States) James Cerretani (Netherlands) Antal van der Duim
- Runner-up: (United States) Austin Krajicek (United States) Mitchell Krueger
- Score: 6–2, 5–7, [10–8]

Events
Singles	Doubles
← 2015 ·	Open de Guadeloupe	· 2018 →

James Cerretani and Antal van der Duim were the defending champions and successfully defended their title, defeating Austin Krajicek and Mitchell Krueger 6–2, 5–7, [10–8] in the final.

== Seeds ==
1. (Canada) Philip Bester / (Canada) Peter Polansky (quarterfinals)
2. (Brazil) André Ghem / (Brazil) João Souza (first round)
3. (United States) Austin Krajicek / (United States) Mitchell Krueger (final)
4. (United States) James Cerretani / (Netherlands) Antal van der Duim (champions)

== Draw ==
=== Key ===
- Q = Qualifier
- WC = Wild card
- LL = Lucky loser
- Alt = Alternate
- ITF = ITF entry
- PR = Protected ranking
- SR = Special ranking
- SE = Special exempt
- JE = Junior exempt
- JR = Junior Accelerator Programme entrant
- CO = College Accelerator Programme entrant
- NG = Next Gen Accelerator Program entrant
- w/o = Walkover
- r = Retired
- d = Defaulted

First round
1	(Canada) P Bester (Canada) P Polansky	6	6
(Belgium) N Desein (Serbia) N Milojević	4	3
(Chile) N Jarry (Venezuela) R Maytín	6	6
(El Salvador) M Arévalo (Ecuador) E Gómez	3	3
3	(United States) A Krajicek (United States) M Krueger	6	6
(Belgium) Julien Dubail (France) M Janvier	3	2
(Belgium) Y Mertens (France) V Millot	5	6	[7]
WC	(France) G Mina (France) Adrien Puget	7	2	[10]
WC	(Guadeloupe) Nicolas Ancedy (France) Aurélien Marne	2	3
(France) G Jacq (France) C Lestienne	6	6
(Canada) F Auger-Aliassime (United States) T Fritz	4	4
4	(United States) J Cerretani (Netherlands) A van der Duim	6	6
WC	(France) Stéphane Balagne (France) Richard Trival	0	1
(Chile) G Lama (Chile) Jorge Montero	6	6
(Colombia) A González (Venezuela) LD Martínez	7^{7}	6
2	(Brazil) A Ghem (Brazil) J Souza	6^{5}	1

Quarterfinals
1	(Canada) P Bester (Canada) P Polansky	2	4
(Chile) N Jarry (Venezuela) R Maytín	6	6
3	(United States) A Krajicek (United States) M Krueger	6	6
WC	(France) G Mina (France) A Puget	4	3
(France) G Jacq (France) C Lestienne	1	2
4	(United States) J Cerretani (Netherlands) A van der Duim	6	6
(Chile) G Lama (Chile) J Montero	2	3
(Colombia) A González (Venezuela) LD Martínez	6	6

Semifinals
(Chile) N Jarry (Venezuela) R Maytín	6	5	[8]
3	(United States) A Krajicek (United States) M Krueger	2	7	[10]
4	(United States) J Cerretani (Netherlands) A van der Duim	7	6
(Colombia) A González (Venezuela) LD Martínez	5	1

Final
3	(United States) A Krajicek (United States) M Krueger	2	7	[8]
4	(United States) J Cerretani (Netherlands) A van der Duim	6	5	[10]
