= 2018 Open de Guadeloupe =

- Date: 27 March – 1 April
- Edition: 7th
- Draw: 32S / 16D
- Surface: Hard
- Location: Le Gosier, Guadeloupe

Champions

Singles
- (Serbia) Dušan Lajović

Doubles
- (United Kingdom) Neal Skupski / (Australia) John-Patrick Smith
← 2016 ·	Open de Guadeloupe

The 2018 Open de Guadeloupe was a professional tennis tournament played on hard courts. It was the seventh edition of the tournament which was part of the 2018 ATP Challenger Tour. It took place in Le Gosier, Guadeloupe between 27 March and 1 April 2018.

== Singles main-draw entrants ==
=== Seeds ===
Country	Player	Rank^{1}	Seed
GRE	Stefanos Tsitsipas	70	1
POR	Gastão Elias	106	2
SRB	Dušan Lajović	108	3
BEL	Ruben Bemelmans	116	4
CAN	Peter Polansky	126	5
USA	Denis Kudla	144	6
FRA	Calvin Hemery	150	7
USA	Bradley Klahn	163	8

- ^{1} Rankings as of 19 March 2018.

=== Other entrants ===
The following players received wildcards into the singles main draw:

- (France) Corentin Denolly
- (Serbia) Dušan Lajović
- (France) Gianni Mina
- (Greece) Stefanos Tsitsipas

The following player received entry into the singles main draw using a protected ranking:

- (Colombia) Santiago Giraldo

The following players received entry into the singles main draw as alternates:

- (United Kingdom) Lloyd Glasspool
- (Japan) Kaichi Uchida

The following players received entry from the qualifying draw:

- (Belgium) Sander Gillé
- (France) Tom Jomby
- (France) Laurent Rochette
- (United States) Evan Song

== Champions ==
=== Singles ===
- (Serbia) Dušan Lajović def. (United States) Denis Kudla 6–4, 6–0.

=== Doubles ===
- (United Kingdom) Neal Skupski / (Australia) John-Patrick Smith def. (Belgium) Ruben Bemelmans / (Australia) John-Patrick Smith 7–6^{(7–3)}, 6–4.
