= 2013 Bauer Watertechnology Cup – Doubles =

Doubles
- 2013 Bauer Watertechnology Cup

Final
- Champions: (Germany) Dustin Brown (Germany) Philipp Marx
- Runners-up: (Poland) Piotr Gadomski (Poland) Mateusz Kowalczyk
- Score: 7–6^{(7–4)}, 6–2

Events
Singles	Doubles
← 2012 ·	Bauer Watertechnology Cup	· 2014 →

James Cerretani and Adil Shamasdin were the defending champions but lost in the first round to German Wildcards Kevin Krawietz and Hannes Wagner.
The title went to the 2nd seeded Germans Dustin Brown and Philipp Marx defeating Poles Piotr Gadomski and Mateusz Kowalczyk 7–6^{(7–4)}, 6–2.

== Seeds ==
1. (India) Purav Raja / (India) Divij Sharan (first round)
2. (Germany) Dustin Brown / (Germany) Philipp Marx (champion)
3. (United States) James Cerretani / (Canada) Adil Shamasdin (first round)
4. (Germany) Andreas Beck / (Germany) Christopher Kas (quarterfinals)

== Draw ==
=== Key ===
- Q = Qualifier
- WC = Wild card
- LL = Lucky loser
- Alt = Alternate
- SE = Special exempt
- PR = Protected ranking
- ITF = ITF entry
- JE = Junior exempt
- w/o = Walkover
- r = Retired
- d = Defaulted
- SR = Special ranking

=== Draw ===
First round
1	(India) P Raja (India) D Sharan	5	7	[3]
WC	(Germany) R Kern (Germany) M Marterer	7	5	[10]
(Poland) Piotr Gadomski (Poland) M Kowalczyk	7^{15}	5	[14]
(Germany) B Becker (Lithuania) R Berankis	6^{13}	7	[12]
4	(Germany) A Beck (Germany) C Kas	6	7^{7}
WC	(Germany) Felix Albert (Germany) Till Guttenberger	1	6^{2}
(Netherlands) A van der Duim (Netherlands) B Westerhof	7	6
(Poland) T Bednarek (Serbia) I Bozoljac	5	1
(Finland) H Kontinen (Sweden) A Siljeström	7	6
(Belgium) R Bemelmans (Canada) F Dancevic	5	3
WC	(Germany) K Krawietz (Germany) Hannes Wagner	4	6	[10]
3	(United States) J Cerretani (Canada) A Shamasdin	6	3	[8]
(Italy) A Arnaboldi (Germany) S Greul	6^{4}	7^{7}	[10]
(Slovakia) K Beck (Czech Republic) J Mertl	7^{7}	6^{2}	[6]
(Uzbekistan) F Dustov (Ukraine) O Nedovyesov	3	4
2	(Germany) D Brown (Germany) P Marx	6	6

Quarterfinals
WC	(Germany) R Kern (Germany) M Marterer	6	3	[5]
(Poland) P Gadomski (Poland) M Kowalczyk	3	6	[10]
4	(Germany) A Beck (Germany) C Kas	6	3	[8]
(Netherlands) A van der Duim (Netherlands) B Westerhof	4	6	[10]
(Finland) H Kontinen (Sweden) A Siljeström	6	1	[12]
WC	(Germany) K Krawietz (Germany) H Wagner	2	6	[10]
(Italy) A Arnaboldi (Germany) S Greul	4	2
2	(Germany) D Brown (Germany) P Marx	6	6

Semifinals
(Poland) P Gadomski (Poland) M Kowalczyk	6	7
(Netherlands) A van der Duim (Netherlands) B Westerhof	3	5
(Finland) H Kontinen (Sweden) A Siljeström	6^{4}	6	[3]
2	(Germany) D Brown (Germany) P Marx	7^{7}	4	[10]

Final
(Poland) P Gadomski (Poland) M Kowalczyk	6^{4}	2
2	(Germany) D Brown (Germany) P Marx	7^{7}	6
