= 2011 Orange Open Guadeloupe – Doubles =

Doubles
- 2011 Orange Open Guadeloupe

Final
- Champions: (Italy) Riccardo Ghedin (France) Stéphane Robert
- Runners-up: (France) Arnaud Clément (Belgium) Olivier Rochus
- Score: 6–2, 5–7, [10–7]

Events
Singles	Doubles
Orange Open Guadeloupe	· 2012 →

Riccardo Ghedin and Stéphane Robert defeated Arnaud Clément and Olivier Rochus 6–2, 5–7, [10–7] in the final.

== Seeds ==
The top three seeds received a bye into the quarterfinals.

1. (Germany) Frank Moser / (Czech Republic) David Škoch (quarterfinals)
2. (Spain) Pablo Andújar / (Spain) Rubén Ramírez Hidalgo (semifinals)
3. (Canada) Pierre-Ludovic Duclos / (Czech Republic) Lukáš Rosol (quarterfinals)
4. (Italy) Simone Bolelli / (Italy) Flavio Cipolla (quarterfinals)

== Draw ==
Key

- Q = Qualifier
- WC = Wild card
- LL = Lucky loser
- Alt = Alternate
- ITF = ITF entry
- PR = Protected ranking
- SR = Special ranking
- SE = Special exempt
- JE = Junior exempt
- JR = Junior Accelerator Programme entrant
- CO = College Accelerator Programme entrant
- NG = Next Gen Accelerator Program entrant
- w/o = Walkover
- r = Retired
- d = Defaulted

=== Draw ===
First round
(France) A Clément (Belgium) O Rochus	6	6
(France) V Millot (France) M Rodrigues	2	4
4	(Italy) S Bolelli (Italy) F Cipolla	4	6	[11]
(Switzerland) S Bohli (Germany) D Brown	6	4	[9]
(Germany) T Kamke (Germany) J Reister	6	6
(Spain) D Gimeno-Traver (Spain) I Navarro	4	2
WC	(Turkey) M İlhan (France) G Mina	4	5
(Italy) R Ghedin (France) S Robert	6	7
(Portugal) G Elias (Portugal) F Gil	6	6
WC	(Spain) Jorge Montesinos (Spain) Israel Sevilla	2	1

Quarterfinals
1	(Germany) F Moser (Czech Republic) D Škoch	6^{4}	6	[4]
(France) A Clément (Belgium) O Rochus	7	4	[10]
4	(Italy) S Bolelli (Italy) F Cipolla	6	2	[7]
(Germany) T Kamke (Germany) J Reister	4	6	[10]
(Italy) R Ghedin (France) S Robert	3	6	[10]
3	(Canada) P-L Duclos (Czech Republic) L Rosol	6	3	5
(Portugal) G Elias (Portugal) F Gil	4	6	[15]
2	(Spain) P Andújar (Spain) R Ramírez Hidalgo	6	1	[17]

Semifinals
(France) A Clément (Belgium) O Rochus	7	6
(Germany) T Kamke (Germany) J Reister	6^{5}	4
(Italy) R Ghedin (France) S Robert	7	6
2	(Spain) P Andújar (Spain) R Ramírez Hidalgo	6^{5}	1

Final
(France) A Clément (Belgium) O Rochus	2	7	[7]
(Italy) R Ghedin (France) S Robert	6	5	[10]
