= 2018 Open de Guadeloupe – Doubles =

Doubles
- 2018 Open de Guadeloupe

Final
- Champions: (United Kingdom) Neal Skupski (Australia) John-Patrick Smith
- Runners-up: (Belgium) Ruben Bemelmans (France) Jonathan Eysseric
- Score: 7–6^{(7–3)}, 6–4

Events
Singles	Doubles
← 2016 ·	Open de Guadeloupe

James Cerretani and Antal van der Duim were the defending champions but only Cerretani chose to defend his title, partnering Nicholas Monroe. Cerretani lost in the first round to Ruben Bemelmans and Jonathan Eysseric.

Neal Skupski and John-Patrick Smith won the title after defeating Bemelmans and Eysseric 7–6^{(7–3)}, 6–4 in the final.

== Seeds ==
1. (United States) James Cerretani / (United States) Nicholas Monroe (first round)
2. (United Kingdom) Neal Skupski / (Australia) John-Patrick Smith (champions)
3. (Belgium) Sander Gillé / (Belgium) Joran Vliegen (quarterfinals)
4. (Philippines) Treat Huey / (United States) Denis Kudla (first round)

== Draw ==
=== Key ===
- Q = Qualifier
- WC = Wild card
- LL = Lucky loser
- Alt = Alternate
- SE = Special exempt
- PR = Protected ranking
- ITF = ITF entry
- JE = Junior exempt
- w/o = Walkover
- r = Retired
- d = Defaulted
- SR = Special ranking

First round
1	(United States) J Cerretani (United States) N Monroe	6	4	[8]
(Belgium) R Bemelmans (France) J Eysseric	3	6	[10]
(Venezuela) R Maytín (Brazil) F Romboli	6	3	[2]
WC	(France) B Bonzi (France) G Jacq	3	6	[10]
3	(Belgium) S Gillé (Belgium) J Vliegen	6^{5}	6	[10]
WC	(France) C Hemery (France) T Setodji	7^{7}	3	[8]
(Canada) P Polansky (Canada) A Shamasdin	6	6
(Mexico) H Hach Verdugo (Canada) B Schnur	4	2
(Croatia) V Galović (Croatia) A Pavić	2	1
(Barbados) D King (United States) B Klahn	6	6
WC	(France) C Denolly (France) Tom Jomby	1	7^{8}	[10]
4	(Philippines) T Huey (United States) D Kudla	6	6^{6}	[7]
(Belgium) Y Mertens (Canada) F Peliwo	3	4
(Chile) C Garín (Australia) A Santillan	6	6
(Colombia) S Giraldo (Argentina) R Olivo	1	1
2	(United Kingdom) N Skupski (Australia) J-P Smith	6	6

Quarterfinals
(Belgium) R Bemelmans (France) J Eysseric	6^{4}	7	[10]
WC	(France) B Bonzi (France) G Jacq	7^{7}	5	[8]
3	(Belgium) S Gillé (Belgium) J Vliegen	6^{7}	7^{8}	[8]
(Canada) P Polansky (Canada) A Shamasdin	7^{9}	6^{6}	[10]
(Barbados) D King (United States) B Klahn	5	3
WC	(France) C Denolly (France) T Jomby	7	6
(Chile) C Garín (Australia) A Santillan	6^{10}	3
2	(United Kingdom) N Skupski (Australia) J-P Smith	7^{12}	6

Semifinals
(Belgium) R Bemelmans (France) J Eysseric	7	6
(Canada) P Polansky (Canada) A Shamasdin	5	3
WC	(France) C Denolly (France) T Jomby	2	5
2	(United Kingdom) N Skupski (Australia) J-P Smith	6	7

Final
(Belgium) R Bemelmans (France) J Eysseric	6^{3}	4
2	(United Kingdom) N Skupski (Australia) J-P Smith	7^{7}	6
