= 2016 Open de Guadeloupe =

- Date: 4–10 April
- Edition: 6th
- Draw: 32S / 16D
- Prize money: $100,000+H
- Surface: Hard
- Location: Le Gosier, Guadeloupe

Champions

Singles
- (Tunisia) Malek Jaziri

Doubles
- (United States) James Cerretani / (Netherlands) Antal van der Duim
← 2015 ·	Open de Guadeloupe	· 2018 →

The 2016 Open de Guadeloupe was a professional tennis tournament played on hard courts. It was the sixth edition of the tournament which was part of the 2016 ATP Challenger Tour. It took place in Le Gosier, Guadeloupe between 4 and 10 April 2016.

== Singles main-draw entrants ==
=== Seeds ===
Country	Player	Rank^{1}	Seed
USA	Rajeev Ram	61	1
USA	Taylor Fritz	81	2
TUN	Malek Jaziri	92	3
USA	Austin Krajicek	104	4
JPN	Tatsuma Ito	120	5
JPN	Yoshihito Nishioka	124	6
COL	Alejandro González	150	7
AUS	John-Patrick Smith	151	8

- ^{1} Rankings as of 21 March 2016.

=== Other entrants ===
The following players received wildcards into the singles main draw:

- (Canada) Félix Auger-Aliassime
- (France) Grégoire Jacq
- (France) Gianni Mina
- (United States) Rajeev Ram

The following players received entry as alternates:

- (United States) Stefan Kozlov
- (Chile) Gonzalo Lama

The following player received entry courtesy of a protected ranking:

- (Canada) Peter Polansky

The following players received entry from the qualifying draw:

- (Belgium) Julien Dubail
- (Ecuador) Emilio Gómez
- (Poland) Hubert Hurkacz
- (Chile) Jorge Montero

== Champions ==
=== Singles ===
- (Tunisia) Malek Jaziri def. (United States) Stefan Kozlov, 6–2, 6–4

=== Doubles ===
- (United States) James Cerretani / (Netherlands) Antal van der Duim def. (United States) Austin Krajicek / (United States) Mitchell Krueger, 6–2, 5–7, [10–8]
