= 2013 Orange Open Guadeloupe =

- Date: 25 March – 31 March
- Edition: 3rd
- Draw: 32S / 16D
- Prize money: $100,000+H
- Surface: Hard
- Location: Le Gosier, Guadeloupe

Champions

Singles
- (France) Benoît Paire

Doubles
- (Israel) Dudi Sela / (Chinese Taipei) Jimmy Wang
← 2012 ·	Orange Open Guadeloupe	· 2014 →

The 2013 Orange Open Guadeloupe was a professional tennis tournament played on hard courts. It was the third edition of the tournament which was part of the 2013 ATP Challenger Tour. It took place in Le Gosier, Guadeloupe between 25 and 31 March 2013.

== Singles main-draw entrants ==
=== Seeds ===
Country	Player	Rank^{1}	Seed
FRA	Benoît Paire	38	1
CZE	Lukáš Rosol	64	2
LUX	Gilles Müller	67	3
SVK	Lukáš Lacko	81	4
UKR	Sergiy Stakhovsky	106	5
GER	Matthias Bachinger	109	6
GER	Jan-Lennard Struff	116	7
FRA	Marc Gicquel	117	8

- ^{1} Rankings are as of March 18, 2013.

=== Other entrants ===
The following players received wildcards into the singles main draw:

- (Belgium) Kimmer Coppejans
- (France) Calvin Hemery
- (France) Julien Obry
- (France) Benoît Paire

The following players received entry from the qualifying draw:

- (India) Prakash Amritraj
- (Moldova) Roman Borvanov
- (Chile) Gonzalo Lama
- (Australia) John Peers

== Doubles main-draw entrants ==
=== Seeds ===
Country	Player	Country	Player	Rank^{1}	Seed
FRA	Benoît Paire	FRA	Édouard Roger-Vasselin	146	1
GER	Philipp Marx	ROU	Florin Mergea	151	2
GBR	Jamie Murray	AUS	John Peers	156	3
USA	James Cerretani	CAN	Adil Shamasdin	169	4

- ^{1} Rankings as of March 18, 2013.

== Champions ==
=== Singles ===
- (France) Benoît Paire def. (Ukraine) Sergiy Stakhovsky, 6–4, 5–7, 6–4

=== Doubles ===
- (Israel) Dudi Sela / (Chinese Taipei) Jimmy Wang def. (Germany) Philipp Marx / (Romania) Florin Mergea, 6–1, 6–2
