= 2011 Orange Open Guadeloupe =

- Date: 14–19 March
- Edition: 1st
- Location: Le Gosier, Guadeloupe

Champions

Singles
- (Belgium) Olivier Rochus

Doubles
- (Italy) Riccardo Ghedin / (France) Stéphane Robert
Orange Open Guadeloupe	· 2012 →

The 2011 Orange Open Guadeloupe was a professional tennis tournament played on hard courts. It was the first edition of the tournament which was part of the 2011 ATP Challenger Tour. It took place in Le Gosier, Guadeloupe between 14 and 19 March 2011.

== ATP entrants ==
=== Seeds ===
Country	Player	Rank^{1}	Seed
FIN	Jarkko Nieminen	51	1
ITA	Fabio Fognini	54	2
ESP	Daniel Gimeno Traver	61	3
GER	Tobias Kamke	68	4
ESP	Pablo Andújar	69	5
ESP	Rubén Ramírez Hidalgo	76	6
POR	Frederico Gil	85	7
ITA	Simone Bolelli	97	8

- Rankings are as of March 7, 2011.

=== Other entrants ===
The following players received wildcards into the singles main draw:

- (Italy) Fabio Fognini
- (Spain) Daniel Gimeno Traver
- (France) Gianni Mina
- (Finland) Jarkko Nieminen

== Champions ==
=== Singles ===
(Belgium) Olivier Rochus def. (France) Stéphane Robert, 6–2, 6–3

=== Doubles ===
(Italy) Riccardo Ghedin / (France) Stéphane Robert def. (France) Arnaud Clément / (Belgium) Olivier Rochus, 6–2, 5–7, [10–7]
