= 2012 Orange Open Guadeloupe =

- Date: 26 March – 1 April
- Edition: 2nd
- Surface: Hard
- Location: Le Gosier, Guadeloupe

Champions

Singles
- (Belgium) David Goffin

Doubles
- (France) Pierre-Hugues Herbert / (France) Albano Olivetti
← 2011 ·	Orange Open Guadeloupe	· 2013 →

The 2012 Orange Open Guadeloupe was a professional tennis tournament played on hard courts. It was the second edition of the tournament which was part of the 2012 ATP Challenger Tour. It took place in Le Gosier, Guadeloupe between 26 March – 1 April 2012.

== Singles main-draw entrants ==
=== Seeds ===
Country	Player	Rank^{1}	Seed
BEL	Olivier Rochus	52	1
TPE	Yen-Hsun Lu	58	2
USA	James Blake	69	3
FRA	Édouard Roger-Vasselin	89	4
RUS	Igor Kunitsyn	90	5
FRA	Nicolas Mahut	92	6
JPN	Tatsuma Ito	94	7
FRA	Benoît Paire	96	8

- ^{1} Rankings are as of March 19, 2012.

=== Other entrants ===
The following players received wildcards into the singles main draw:

- (United States) James Blake
- (France) Gianni Mina
- (France) Josselin Ouanna
- (Belgium) Olivier Rochus

The following players received entry as an alternate into the singles main draw:

- (Ukraine) Sergei Bubka
- (Canada) Pierre-Ludovic Duclos
- (Portugal) Gastão Elias
- (Italy) Thomas Fabbiano
- (Japan) Yūichi Sugita
- (Germany) Mischa Zverev

The following players received entry as a special exempt into the singles main draw:

- (Belgium) Maxime Authom

The following players received entry from the qualifying draw:

- (United Kingdom) Dan Evans
- (France) Pierre-Hugues Herbert
- (Slovakia) Ivo Klec
- (France) Julien Obry

The following players received entry as a lucky loser into the singles main draw:

- (United Kingdom) Alexander Ward

== Champions ==
=== Singles ===
- (Belgium) David Goffin def. (Germany) Mischa Zverev, 6–2, 6–2

=== Doubles ===
- (France) Pierre-Hugues Herbert / (France) Albano Olivetti def. (Australia) Paul Hanley / (Australia) Jordan Kerr, 7–5, 1–6, [10–7]
