= 2014 Open de Guadeloupe – Singles =

Singles
- 2014 Open de Guadeloupe

Final
- Champion: (United States) Steve Johnson
- Runner-up: (France) Kenny de Schepper
- Score: 6–1, 6–7^{(5–7)}, 7–6^{(7–2)}

Events
| Singles | Doubles |
- Open de Guadeloupe

This article deals with solely the single matches of the 2014 Open de Guadeloupe professional tennis tournament.

Benoît Paire was the defending champion, but decided not to compete. Steve Johnson won the title, defeating Kenny de Schepper in the final, 6–1, 6–7^{(5–7)}, 7–6^{(7–2)}.

== Seeds ==
1. (France) Kenny de Schepper (final)
2. (Germany) Benjamin Becker (quarterfinals)
3. (United States) Steve Johnson (champion)
4. (United States) Michael Russell (semifinals)
5. (Argentina) Horacio Zeballos (first round)
6. (United States) Denis Kudla (quarterfinals)
7. (Belgium) Ruben Bemelmans (first round)
8. (Spain) Rubén Ramírez Hidalgo (second round)

== Draw ==
Key

- Q = Qualifier
- WC = Wild card
- LL = Lucky loser
- Alt = Alternate
- ITF = ITF entry
- PR = Protected ranking
- SR = Special ranking
- SE = Special exempt
- JE = Junior exempt
- JR = Junior Accelerator Programme entrant
- CO = College Accelerator Programme entrant
- NG = Next Gen Accelerator Program entrant
- w/o = Walkover
- r = Retired
- d = Defaulted

=== Finals ===
Semifinals
1 | (France) Kenny de Schepper | 6^{1} | 6 | 6
4 | (United States) Michael Russell | 7^{7} | 3 | 4
3 | (United States) Steve Johnson | 7^{7} | 6
(Italy) Thomas Fabbiano | 6^{5} | 4

Final
1 | (France) Kenny de Schepper | 1 | 7^{7} | 2
3 | (United States) Steve Johnson | 6 | 6^{5} | 7^{7}

=== Top half ===
First round
1 | (France) Kenny de Schepper | 7^{11} | 6
(France) G Mina | 6^{9} | 1
WC | (France) C Lestienne | 4 | 6 | 6^{7}
Q | (France) Élie Rousset | 6 | 3 | 7^{9}
LL | (Poland) T Bednarek | 1 | 1
(Spain) DM de la Nava | 6 | 6
(Italy) A Arnaboldi | 6 | 7
7 | (Belgium) R Bemelmans | 3 | 5
4 | (United States) M Russell | 6 | 1 | 6
(Venezuela) D Souto | 4 | 6 | 3
(Argentina) M Trungelliti | 6 | 4 | 6
(Brazil) Henrique Cunha | 2 | 6 | 1
(France) F Martin | 6 | 6
(Czech Republic) J Mertl | 3 | 4
Q | (Argentina) Mateo Nicolás Martínez | 1 | 1
8 | (Spain) R Ramírez Hidalgo | 6 | 6

Second round
1 | (France) K de Schepper | 6 | 6^{4} | 7
Q | (France) É Rousset | 3 | 7^{7} | 5
(Spain) DM de la Nava | 7 | 6
(Italy) A Arnaboldi | 5 | 4
4 | (United States) M Russell | 6^{5} | 6 | 6
(Argentina) M Trungelliti | 7^{7} | 1 | 4
(France) F Martin | 6 | 6
8 | (Spain) R Ramírez Hidalgo | 3 | 4

Quarterfinals
1 | (France) K de Schepper | 7^{9} | 6
(Spain) DM de la Nava | 6^{7} | 3
4 | (United States) M Russell | 3 | 7^{7} | 7^{7}
(France) F Martin | 6 | 6^{5} | 6^{2}

Semifinals
1 | (France) K de Schepper | 6^{1} | 6 | 6
4 | (United States) M Russell | 7^{7} | 3 | 4

=== Bottom half ===
First round
6 | (United States) D Kudla | 2 | 6 | 6
(France) J Eysseric | 6 | 1 | 3
(Italy) R Ghedin | 4 | 4
(Argentina) R Olivo | 6 | 6
WC | (France) Rudy Coco | 3 | 2
(Germany) M Bachinger | 6 | 6
Q | (New Zealand) M Venus | 3 | 5
3 | (United States) S Johnson | 6 | 7
5 | (Argentina) H Zeballos | 7 | 3 | 3
(Belgium) O Rochus | 5 | 6 | 6
(France) V Millot | 3 | 6 | 6
(Brazil) A Ghem | 6 | 2 | 4
Q | (Italy) C Grassi | 6 | 3 | 1
(Italy) T Fabbiano | 2 | 6 | 6
LL | (France) Tristan Meraut | 0 | 2
2 | (Germany) B Becker | 6 | 6

Second round
6 | (United States) D Kudla | 6 | 6
(Argentina) R Olivo | 4 | 3
(Germany) M Bachinger | 7^{7} | 6^{3} | 3
3 | (United States) S Johnson | 6^{4} | 7^{7} | 6
(Belgium) O Rochus | 3 | 6 | 7
(France) V Millot | 6 | 1 | 5
(Italy) T Fabbiano | 3 | 6 | 6
2 | (Germany) B Becker | 6 | 3 | 2

Quarterfinals
6 | (United States) D Kudla | 4 | 0
3 | (United States) S Johnson | 6 | 6
(Belgium) O Rochus | 2 | 6^{5}
(Italy) T Fabbiano | 6 | 7^{7}

Semifinals
3 | (United States) S Johnson | 7^{7} | 6
(Italy) T Fabbiano | 6^{5} | 4
