= 2013 Bauer Watertechnology Cup – Singles =

Singles
- 2013 Bauer Watertechnology Cup

Final
- Champion: (Germany) Benjamin Becker
- Runner-up: (Belgium) Ruben Bemelmans
- Score: 2–6, 7–6^{(7–3)}, 6–4

Events
Singles	Doubles
← 2012 ·	Bauer Watertechnology Cup	· 2014 →

Daniel Brands was the defending champion, but chose not to compete.
Top seed Benjamin Becker won title defeating Ruben Bemelmans 2–6, 7–6^{(7–3)}, 6–4.

== Seeds ==
1. (Germany) Benjamin Becker (champion)
2. (Ukraine) Oleksandr Nedovyesov (second round)
3. (Italy) Matteo Viola (second round)
4. (Canada) Frank Dancevic (first round)
5. (Germany) Dustin Brown (semifinals)
6. (Lithuania) Ričardas Berankis (second round)
7. (Belgium) Ruben Bemelmans (final)
8. (Germany) Andreas Beck (quarterfinals)

== Draw ==
=== Key ===
- Q = Qualifier
- WC = Wild card
- LL = Lucky loser
- Alt = Alternate
- SE = Special exempt
- PR = Protected ranking
- ITF = ITF entry
- JE = Junior exempt
- w/o = Walkover
- r = Retired
- d = Defaulted
- SR = Special ranking

=== Finals ===
Semifinals
1	(Germany) Benjamin Becker	6	6
5	(Germany) Dustin Brown	4	4
7	(Belgium) Ruben Bemelmans	3	6	6
(Germany) Tim Pütz	6	2	1

Final
1	(Germany) Benjamin Becker	2	7^{7}	6
7	(Belgium) Ruben Bemelmans	6	6^{3}	4

=== Top half ===
First round
1	(Germany) B Becker	6	6
Q	(Poland) M Kowalczyk	3	4
Q	(Croatia) F Veger	2	2
(Italy) A Arnaboldi	6	6
(Slovakia) M Mečíř Jr.	4	6	6
WC	(Germany) K Krawietz	6	3	2
WC	(Germany) Hannes Wagner	3	4
8	(Germany) A Beck	6	6
3	(Italy) M Viola	6	6
(Bosnia and Herzegovina) A Šetkić	1	3
(Serbia) I Bozoljac	6^{6}	4
(Czech Republic) J Mertl	7^{8}	6
(Belgium) N Desein	6	3	6
(Poland) G Panfil	0	6	2
(Hungary) M Fucsovics	6	3	3
5	(Germany) D Brown	1	6	6

Second round
1	(Germany) B Becker	6	4	6
(Italy) A Arnaboldi	3	6	4
(Slovakia) M Mečíř Jr.	6^{4}	0
8	(Germany) A Beck	7^{7}	6
3	(Italy) M Viola	2	4
(Czech Republic) J Mertl	6	6
(Belgium) N Desein	2	7	4
5	(Germany) D Brown	6	5	6

Quarterfinals
1	(Germany) B Becker	4	6	6
8	(Germany) A Beck	6	3	3
(Czech Republic) J Mertl	7	1	6^{4}
5	(Germany) D Brown	5	6	7^{7}

Semifinals
1	(Germany) B Becker	6	6
5	(Germany) D Brown	4	4

=== Bottom half ===
First round
7	(Belgium) R Bemelmans	6	6
(Netherlands) B Westerhof	4	4
(Slovakia) M Semjan	0	4
(Belarus) U Ignatik	6	6
Q	(Hungary) L Gödry	4	4
WC	(Germany) R Kern	6	6
(Germany) S Greul	7^{10}	4	6
4	(Canada) F Dancevic	6^{8}	6	3
6	(Lithuania) R Berankis	6	7
(Germany) B Phau	1	5
(Uzbekistan) F Dustov	7	6
WC	(Germany) M Marterer	5	4
(Germany) Stefan Seifert	2	2
(Germany) T Pütz	6	6
Q	(Poland) Piotr Gadomski	3	4
2	(Ukraine) O Nedovyesov	6	6

Second round
7	(Belgium) R Bemelmans	6	6
(Belarus) U Ignatik	2	4
WC	(Germany) R Kern	1	4
(Germany) S Greul	6	6
6	(Lithuania) R Berankis	6	3	6^{7}
(Uzbekistan) F Dustov	3	6	7^{9}
(Germany) T Pütz	6	2
2	(Ukraine) O Nedovyesov	4	1^{r}

Quarterfinals
7	(Belgium) R Bemelmans	6	6
(Germany) S Greul	4	1
(Uzbekistan) F Dustov	6	3	4
(Germany) T Pütz	4	6	6

Semifinals
7	(Belgium) R Bemelmans	3	6	6
(Germany) T Pütz	6	2	1
