= Ruben Bemelmans =

Belgian tennis player (born 1988)

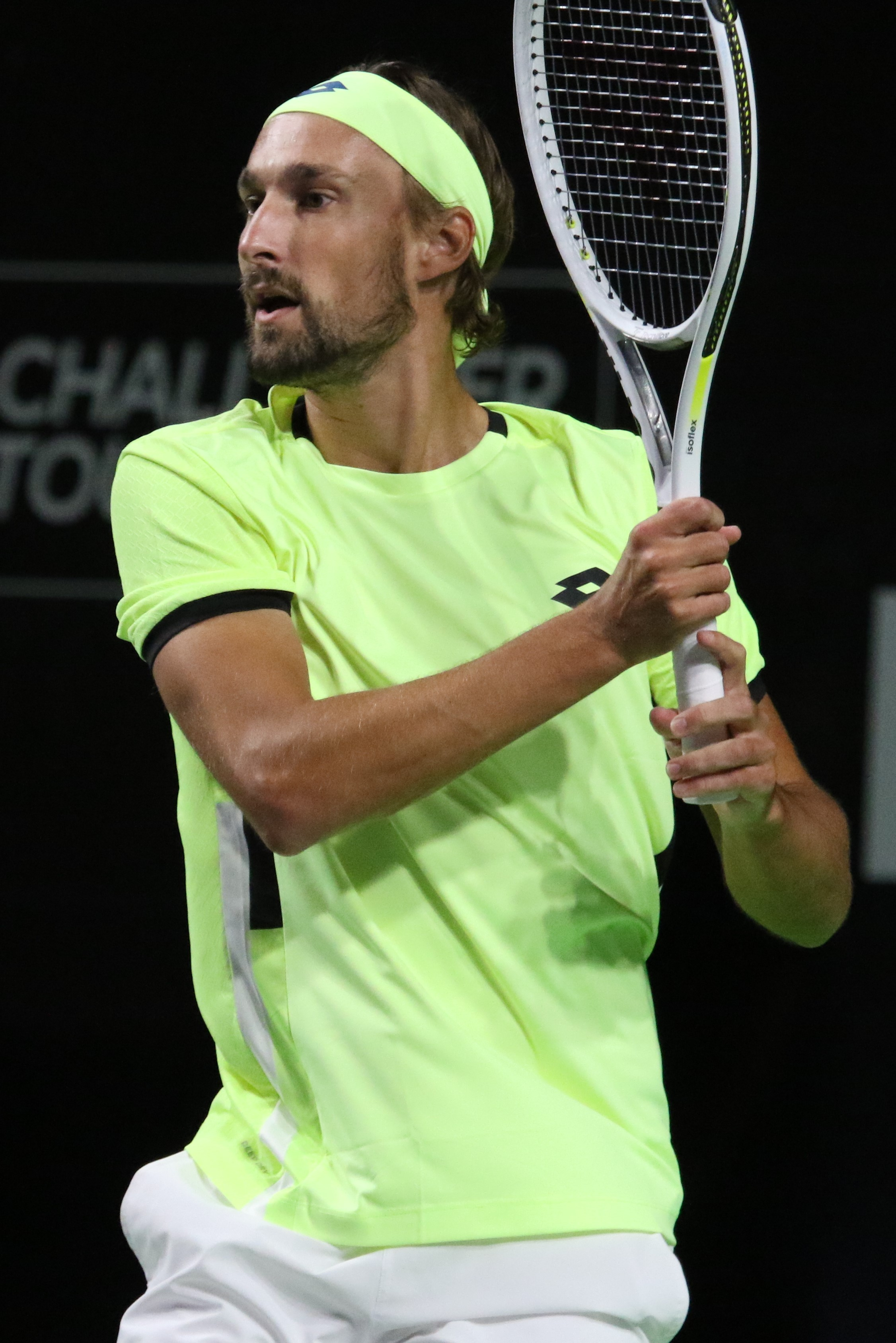
- Bemelmans in 2021
- Country (sports): Belgium
- Residence: Maasmechelen, Belgium
- Born: 14 January 1988 (age 38) Genk, Belgium
- Height: 1.83 m (6 ft 0 in)
- Turned pro: 2006
- Retired: Oct 2022
- Plays: Left-handed (two-handed backhand)
- Prize money: US$2,192,636

Singles
- Career record: 30–61
- Career titles: 0
- Highest ranking: No. 84 (28 September 2015)

Grand Slam singles results
- Australian Open: 2R (2018)
- French Open: 2R (2018)
- Wimbledon: 3R (2017)
- US Open: 3R (2015)

Doubles
- Career record: 13–16
- Career titles: 1
- Highest ranking: No. 128 (1 October 2012)

Grand Slam doubles results
- Wimbledon: Q1 (2012, 2017, 2018)

Team competitions
- Davis Cup: F (2015, 2017)
- Hopman Cup: F (2011)
- Last updated on: 22 October 2022.

Ruben Bemelmans (Flemish pronunciation: [ˈrybə(m) ˈbeːməlmɑns]; born 14 January 1988) is a Belgian tennis coach and a former professional player. He has a career-high ATP ranking of world No. 84 in singles, achieved on 28 September 2015, and world No. 128 in doubles, achieved on 1 October 2012. Bemelmans competed mainly on the ATP Challenger Tour.

== Professional Career ==
=== 2006–2009: Turned Pro ===
Bemelmans won his first Futures event in Espelkamp, Germany in July 2007. His best performance to date was in winning the Volkswagen Challenger event in Wolfsburg in March 2009, winning three matches in qualifying before going on to beat Stefano Galvani of Italy in the final. He won this tournament again in 2011.

=== 2010–2014: ATP and Grand Slam debut, Hopman Cup finalist ===
In February 2010 Bemelmans succeeded in qualifying for his first ATP level event, the Zagreb Indoors tournament. However he lost in the first round to Alexandre Sidorenko of France in three sets.

In June 2010, he entered the main draw of the 2010 Gerry Weber Open in Halle as a lucky loser. In the opening round he lost to German Philipp Kohlschreiber in three close sets.

In September 2010, Ruben played for Belgium in the Davis cup play-off tie against Australia. He was a late replacement for an injured Steve Darcis. He played Lleyton Hewitt and after a solid effort, he succumbed in a 6–7, 5–7, 6–2, 4–6 duel.

In January 2011, Bemelmans was invited to represent Belgium in the Hopman Cup alongside Justine Henin. They reached the final, beating Kazakhstan and Serbia along the way, where they were defeated by USA 2–1.

Bemelmans won his first match in a Grand Slam main draw at 2012 Wimbledon, defeating Carlos Berlocq in 4 sets. He was bested by Richard Gasquet in straight sets in the second round. About a month later, Bemelmans (playing doubles with fellow countryman Xavier Malisse) won his first title on the ATP Tour, the 250 level Los Angeles Open.

In 2013, Bemelmans made the final of 2 Challenger Tour events, Nottingham (a Challenger event from 2011 to 2014) and Eckental where he lost to Steve Johnson and Benjamin Becker respectively. As a qualifier, Bemelmans reached the quarterfinals of Vienna in 2013, defeating No. 4 seed Philipp Kohlschreiber en route.

2014 saw Bemelmans have another strong showing at Eckental, this time winning the tournament, beating 2012 champion Daniel Brands en route.

=== 2015–2018: US Open and Wimbledon third rounds ===
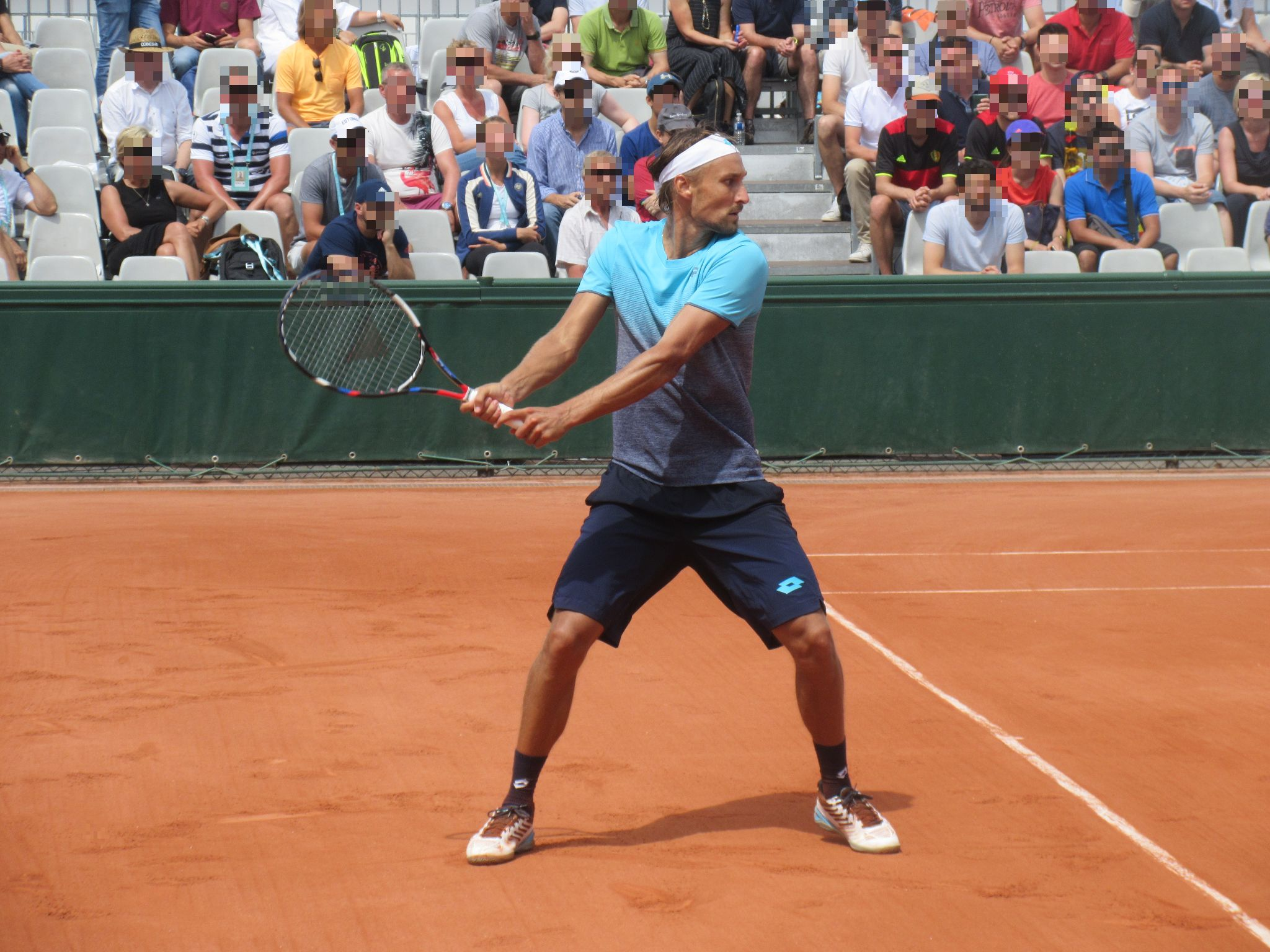
Ruben Bemelmans at the 2018 French Open

In September 2015, Bemelmans defeated Gilles Müller and Jack Sock (retired) to reach the third round of the US Open where he lost against Switzerland's Stan Wawrinka in three sets.

He was unable to defend his title in Eckental however, falling in the semi-finals to Benjamin Becker. Bemelmans also played an active part in the Belgian Davis Cup team that reached the final that season, and played the second singles rubber where he was beaten by Andy Murray.

Bemelmans made 2 Challenger finals late in 2016, at Charlottesville and Champaign.

In 2017, Bemelmans won the title in Koblenz, which pushed him back inside the Top 150, before losing to Denis Shapovalov in the final of the Challenger in Drummondville.

He then made the third round of Wimbledon, his best result at the tournament, beating former world No. 2 Tommy Haas in the first round.

The 2018 Australian Open saw Bemelmans win his first match at the tournament in 3 main draw appearances when he earned a credible first round victory over 18th seed Lucas Pouille.

At the 2018 French Open he made it past the first round for the second consecutive grand slam when he beat Yuki Bhambri in his opening match. However he lost in five sets in round two to Estonian Jürgen Zopp.

Bemelmans qualified for the 2018 Wimbledon Championships defeating Bernard Tomic in the final qualifying round. He then defeated American Steve Johnson in five sets to reach round 2 of a slam for the third consecutive time in 2018.

=== 2019–2022: Retirement ===
He made history when he qualified for an Open Era record sixth time at the 2019 Wimbledon Championships beating American Donald Young 6–4, 6–4, 6–1. Bemelmans had been tied for the qualifying record with Alejandro Falla, Ken Flach, Edouard Roger-Vasselin and Jimmy Wang.

In February 2021, Bemelmans won his sixth singles Challenger title at the 2021 Challenger La Manche defeating Lukáš Rosol. In September 2021, he also won his tenth doubles Challenger title at the 2021 Challenger Biel/Bienne partnering Daniel Masur.

He played his last singles professional match in the qualifying draw as a wildcard at the 2022 European Open in Antwerp. He also participated in the doubles event having received also a wildcard partnering compatriot Alexander Blockx where he lost in the first round.

== Coaching Career ==
Following his retirement, he coached Zizou Bergs until 2026. He also accompanied Alexander Blockx in April that year, at the 2026 Mutua Madrid Open, although not in a confirmed official coach role.

== ATP career finals ==
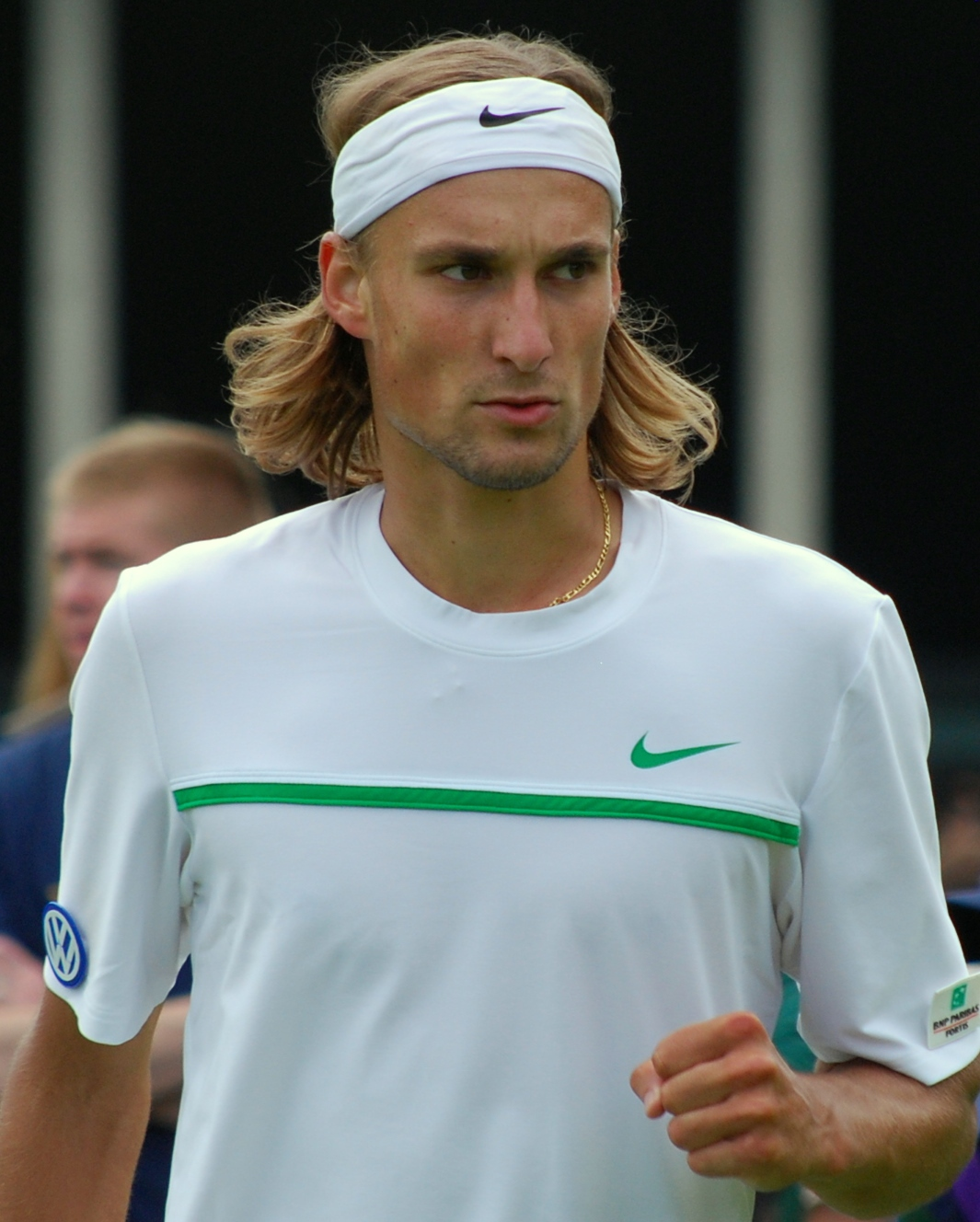
Ruben Bemelmans at the 2011 Wimbledon Championships

=== Doubles: 1 (1 title) ===
Legend Grand Slam Tournaments (0–0) ATP World Tour Finals (0–0) ATP World Tour Masters 1000 (0–0) ATP World Tour 500 Series (0–0) ATP World Tour 250 Series (1–0)	Finals by surface Hard (1–0) Clay (0–0) Grass (0–0) Carpet (0–0)

Result	W–L	Date	Tournament	Tier	Surface	Partner	Opponents	Score
Win	1–0	Jul 2012	Los Angeles Open, US	250 Series	Hard	(Belgium) Xavier Malisse	(United Kingdom) Jamie Delgado (United Kingdom) Ken Skupski	7–6^{(7–5)}, 4–6, [10–7]

== Team competition finals ==
Result	W–L	Date	Tournament	Surface	Partners	Opponents	Score
Loss	0–1	Jan 2011	Hopman Cup, Perth, Western Australia	Hard	(Belgium) Justine Henin	(United States) Bethanie Mattek-Sands (United States) John Isner	1–2
Loss	0–2	Nov 2015	Davis Cup, Ghent, Belgium	Clay (i)	(Belgium) David Goffin (Belgium) Steve Darcis (Belgium) Kimmer Coppejans	(United Kingdom) Andy Murray (United Kingdom) Kyle Edmund (United Kingdom) James Ward (United Kingdom) Jamie Murray	1–3
Loss	0–3	Nov 2017	Davis Cup, Lille, France	Hard (i)	(Belgium) David Goffin (Belgium) Steve Darcis (Belgium) Joris De Loore	(France) Jo-Wilfried Tsonga (France) Lucas Pouille (France) Richard Gasquet (France) Pierre-Hugues Herbert	2–3

== Challenger and Futures finals ==
=== Singles: 37 (20–17) ===
Legend (singles) ATP Challenger Tour (6–13) ITF Futures Tour (14–4)	Titles by surface Hard (12–8) Clay (2–3) Grass (0–1) Carpet (6–5)

Result	W–L	Date	Tournament	Tier	Surface	Opponent	Score
Loss	0–1	Mar 2007	Sweden F1, Malmö	Futures	Hard (i)	(Sweden) Pablo Figueroa	6–7^{(8–10)}, 5–7
Loss	0–2	Jun 2007	Romania F5, Bacău	Futures	Clay	(Romania) Artemon Apostu-Efremov	2–6, 0–6
Loss	0–3	Jul 2007	Germany F9, Römerberg	Futures	Clay	(Jamaica) Dustin Brown	3–6, 6–7^{(4–7)}
Win	1–3	Jul 2007	Germany F10, Espelkamp	Futures	Clay	(Germany) Franz Stauder	6–2, 7–5
Win	2–3	Nov 2007	Israel F4, Ramat HaSharon	Futures	Hard	(Belgium) Niels Desein	6–3, 6–3
Loss	2–4	Jan 2008	Germany F3, Kaarst	Futures	Carpet (i)	(Belgium) Jeroen Masson	2–6, 6–4, 2–6
Win	3–4	Mar 2008	Switzerland F2, Bassersdorf	Futures	Carpet (i)	(Czech Republic) Ladislav Chramosta	3–6, 6–3, 6–2
Win	4–4	May 2008	Italy F15, Cesena	Futures	Clay	(Ecuador) Carlos Avellán	6–4, 3–6, 6–0
Loss	4–5	Nov 2008	Aachen, Germany	Challenger	Carpet (i)	(Russia) Evgeny Korolev	6–7^{(5–7)}, 6–7^{(3–7)}
Win	5–5	Feb 2009	France F3, Bressuire	Futures	Hard (i)	(France) Vincent Millot	6–4, 6–3
Win	6–5	Mar 2009	Wolfsburg, Germany	Challenger	Carpet (i)	(Italy) Stefano Galvani	7–6^{(7–5)}, 3–6, 6–3
Win	7–5	Sep 2009	France F15, Plaisir	Futures	Hard (i)	(France) Pierrick Ysern	6–7^{(5–7)}, 6–1, 7–5
Win	8–5	Mar 2010	France F4, Lille	Futures	Hard (i)	(Belgium) Niels Desein	6–4, 6–2
Win	9–5	Mar 2010	France F5, Poitiers	Futures	Hard (i)	(France) Charles-Antoine Brézac	6–4, 4–6, 6–4
Win	10–5	Jul 2010	Spain F23, Palma del Río	Futures	Hard	(Belgium) Niels Desein	4–6, 6–4, 7–6^{(7–1)}
Loss	10–6	Nov 2010	Eckental, Germany	Challenger	Carpet (i)	(Netherlands) Igor Sijsling	6–3, 2–6, 3–6
Win	11–6	Feb 2011	Wolfsburg, Germany	Challenger	Carpet (i)	(Germany) Dominik Meffert	6–7^{(8–10)}, 6–4, 6–4
Loss	11–7	Jan 2012	Heilbronn, Germany	Challenger	Hard (i)	(Germany) Björn Phau	7–6^{(7–4)}, 3–6, 4–6
Loss	11–8	May 2012	Athens, Greece	Challenger	Hard	(Australia) Marinko Matosevic	3–6, 4–6
Loss	11–9	Sep 2012	Orléans, France	Challenger	Hard (i)	(Belgium) David Goffin	4–6, 6–3, 3–6
Loss	11–10	Jun 2013	Nottingham, Great Britain	Challenger	Grass	(United States) Steve Johnson	5–7, 5–7
Loss	11–11	Nov 2013	Eckental, Germany	Challenger	Carpet (i)	(Germany) Benjamin Becker	6–2, 6–7^{(3–7)}, 4–6
Win	12–11	Nov 2014	Eckental, Germany	Challenger	Carpet (i)	(Germany) Tim Pütz	7–6^{(7–3)}, 6–3
Win	13–11	Feb 2015	Germany F4, Nußloch	Futures	Carpet (i)	(Germany) Maximilian Marterer	6–3, 6–7^{(2–7)}, 7–6^{(7–5)}
Loss	13–12	Feb 2015	Glasgow, Great Britain	Challenger	Hard (i)	(Belgium) Niels Desein	6–7^{(4–7)}, 6–2, 6–7^{(4–7)}
Win	14–12	Apr 2015	Le Gosier, Guadeloupe	Challenger	Hard	(France) Édouard Roger-Vasselin	7–6^{(8–6)}, 6–3
Win	15–12	Jul 2016	Belgium F5, Middelkerke	Futures	Hard	(Belgium) Yannick Mertens	6–3, 6–7^{(3–7)}, 6–1
Win	16–12	Oct 2016	USA F34, Burlingame	Futures	Hard (i)	(Republic of Ireland) Sam Barry	6–1, 6–2
Loss	16–13	Nov 2016	Charlottesville, USA	Challenger	Hard (i)	(United States) Reilly Opelka	4–6, 6–2, 6–7^{(5–7)}
Loss	16–14	Nov 2016	Champaign, USA	Challenger	Hard (i)	(Switzerland) Henri Laaksonen	5–7, 3–6
Win	17–14	Jan 2017	Koblenz, Germany	Challenger	Hard (i)	(Germany) Nils Langer	6–4, 3–6, 7–6^{(7–0)}
Loss	17–15	Mar 2017	Drummondville, Canada	Challenger	Hard (i)	(Canada) Denis Shapovalov	3–6, 2–6
Loss	17–16	Jul 2017	Scheveningen, Netherlands	Challenger	Clay	(Spain) Guillermo García López	1–6, 7–6^{(7–3)}, 2–6
Loss	17–17	Nov 2018	Eckental, Germany	Challenger	Carpet (i)	(France) Antoine Hoang	5–7, 3–6
Win	18–17	Jan 2020	Germany M25, Nußloch	ITF World Tennis Tour	Carpet (i)	(Czech Republic) Jonáš Forejtek	6–7^{(4–7)}, 7–6^{(7–3)}, 6–2
Win	19–17	Mar 2020	Italy M25, Trento	ITF World Tennis Tour	Hard (i)	(Austria) Alexander Erler	4–6, 6–2, 6–4
Win	20–17	Feb 2021	Cherbourg, France	Challenger	Hard (i)	(Czech Republic) Lukas Rosol	6–4, 6–4

=== Doubles: 40 (27–13) ===
Legend (doubles) ATP Challenger Tour (13–9) ITF Futures Tour (14–4)	Titles by surface Hard (18–9) Clay (6–2) Grass (0–1) Carpet (3–1)

Result	W–L	Date	Tournament	Tier	Surface	Partner	Opponents	Score
Win	1–0	Aug 2006	Germany F11, Essen	Futures	Clay	(Belgium) Niels Desein	(Netherlands) Antal van der Duim (Netherlands) Boy Westerhof	1–6, 7–5, 7–5
Win	2–0	Feb 2007	Spain F7, Cartagena	Futures	Hard	(Belgium) Yannick Mertens	(Italy) Alessandro da Col (Spain) Abel Hernández-García	7–6^{(7–2)}, 6–2
Loss	2–1	Jun 2007	Netherlands F1, Alkmaar	Futures	Clay	(Belgium) Yannick Mertens	(Netherlands) Romano Frantzen (Netherlands) Nick van der Meer	4–6, 6–4, 2–6
Win	3–1	Jul 2007	Germany F10, Espelkamp	Futures	Clay	(Germany) Andre Begemann	(Netherlands) Remko de Rijke (Netherlands) Bas van der Valk	6–3, 6–3
Loss	3–2	Nov 2007	Great Britain F21, Redbridge	Futures	Hard (i)	(Belgium) Niels Desein	(United Kingdom) Josh Goodall (United Kingdom) Ken Skupski	7–5, 6–7^{(3–7)}, [5–10]
Win	4–2	Mar 2008	France F5, Poitiers	Futures	Hard (i)	(Belgium) Stefan Wauters	(France) Julien Jeanpierre (France) Josselin Ouanna	7–5, 6–4
Loss	4–3	Apr 2008	Turkey F5, Antalya	Futures	Clay	(Belgium) Yannick Mertens	(Egypt) Karim Maamoun (Egypt) Sherif Sabry	6–3, 4–6, [10–12]
Win	5–3	May 2008	Italy F15, Cesena	Futures	Clay	(Argentina) Horacio Zeballos	(Argentina) Antonio Pastorino (Argentina) Damián Patriarca	6–2, 6–4
Win	6–3	Jun 2008	Slovenia F2, Maribor	Futures	Clay	(Belgium) Bart de Keersmaeker	(Austria) Markus Hipfl (Austria) Marco Mirnegg	6–1, 6–3
Win	7–3	Aug 2008	Belgium F2, Koksijde	Futures	Clay	(Belgium) Niels Desein	(Belgium) Alexandre Folie (Belgium) David Goffin	7–5, 7–5
Win	8–3	Sep 2008	France F14, Mulhouse	Futures	Hard (i)	(Belgium) Niels Desein	(Jamaica) Dustin Brown (Germany) Stefan Seifert	7–6^{(13–11)}, 6–3
Win	9–3	Oct 2008	France F18, Saint-Dizier	Futures	Hard (i)	(Belgium) Niels Desein	(Spain) Guillermo Alcaide (Russia) Nikolai Nesterov	6–4, 3–6, [10–6]
Loss	9–4	Sep 2009	St Remy, France	Challenger	Hard	(Belgium) Niels Desein	(Czech Republic) Jiří Krkoška (Slovakia) Lukáš Lacko	1–6, 6–3, [3–10]
Win	10–4	Sep 2009	France F14, Mulhouse	Futures	Hard (i)	(Belgium) Yannick Mertens	(Russia) Konstantin Kravchuk (Russia) Alexander Kudryavtsev	6–3, 7–6^{(8–6)}
Win	11–4	Mar 2010	France F4, Lille	Futures	Hard (i)	(Belgium) Niels Desein	(South Africa) Raven Klaasen (South Africa) Izak van der Merwe	7–6^{(7–4)}, 6–3
Win	12–4	Mar 2010	France F5, Poitiers	Futures	Hard (i)	(Belgium) Yannick Mertens	(France) Olivier Patience (France) Nicolas Renavand	3–6, 6–1, [10–6]
Loss	12–5	Oct 2010	Mons, Belgium	Challenger	Hard (i)	(Belgium) Yannick Mertens	(Slovakia) Filip Polášek (Slovakia) Igor Zelenay	6–3, 4–6, [5–10]
Win	13–5	Nov 2010	Aachen, Germany	Challenger	Carpet (i)	(Netherlands) Igor Sijsling	(United Kingdom) Jamie Delgado (United Kingdom) Jonathan Marray	6–4, 3–6, [11–9]
Win	14–5	Aug 2012	Vancouver, Canada	Challenger	Hard	(Belgium) Maxime Authom	(Australia) John Peers (Australia) John-Patrick Smith	6–4, 6–2
Loss	14–6	Jun 2014	Nottingham, Great Britain	Challenger	Grass	(Japan) Go Soeda	(Australia) Rameez Junaid (New Zealand) Michael Venus	6–4, 6–7^{(1–7)}, [6–10]
Win	15–6	Aug 2014	Aptos, USA	Challenger	Hard	(Lithuania) Laurynas Grigelis	(India) Purav Raja (India) Sanam Singh	6–3, 4–6, [11–9]
Loss	15–7	Oct 2014	France F24, Rodez	Futures	Hard (i)	(Belgium) Maxime Authom	(Republic of Ireland) James Cluskey (Republic of Ireland) David O'Hare	6–7^{(5–7)}, 6–3, [8–10]
Win	16–7	Nov 2014	Eckental, Germany	Challenger	Carpet (i)	(Belgium) Niels Desein	(Germany) Andreas Beck (Germany) Philipp Petzschner	6–3, 4–6, [10–8]
Win	17–7	Oct 2015	Mons, Belgium	Challenger	Hard (i)	(Germany) Philipp Petzschner	(Australia) Rameez Junaid (Slovakia) Igor Zelenay	6–3, 6–1
Win	18–7	Nov 2015	Eckental, Germany	Challenger	Carpet (i)	(Germany) Philipp Petzschner	(United Kingdom) Ken Skupski (United Kingdom) Neal Skupski	7–5, 6–2
Win	19–7	Jul 2016	Belgium F5, Middelkerke	Futures	Hard	(Belgium) Yannick Mertens	(United States) Hunter Johnson (United States) Yates Johnson	6–1, 6–1
Loss	19–8	Jul 2016	Recanati, Italy	Challenger	Hard	(Spain) Adrián Menéndez Maceiras	(Germany) Kevin Krawietz (France) Albano Olivetti	3–6, 6–7^{(4–7)}
Loss	19–9	Nov 2016	Knoxville, USA	Challenger	Hard (i)	(Belgium) Joris De Loore	(Canada) Peter Polansky (Canada) Adil Shamasdin	1–6, 3–6
Loss	19–10	Nov 2016	Kyoto, Japan	Challenger	Hard (i)	(Belgium) Joris De Loore	(Thailand) Sanchai Ratiwatana (Thailand) Sonchat Ratiwatana	6–4, 4–6, [7–10]
Loss	19–11	Apr 2018	Le Gosier, Guadeloupe	Challenger	Hard	(France) Jonathan Eysseric	(Australia) John-Patrick Smith (United Kingdom) Neal Skupski	6–7^{(3–7)}, 4–6
Win	20–11	Apr 2019	Tunis, Tunisia	Challenger	Clay	(Germany) Tim Pütz	(Argentina) Facundo Argüello (Argentina) Guillermo Durán	6–3, 6–1
Loss	20–12	May 2019	Seoul, Korea, Rep.	Challenger	Hard	(Ukraine) Sergiy Stakhovsky	(Australia) Max Purcell (Australia) Luke Saville	4–6, 6–7^{(7–9)}
Win	21–12	Sep 2019	Glasgow, United Kingdom	Challenger	Hard (i)	(Germany) Daniel Masur	(United Kingdom) Jamie Murray (Australia) John-Patrick Smith	4–6, 6–3, [10–8]
Win	22–12	Mar 2020	Italy M25, Trento	ITF World Tennis Tour	Hard (i)	(Germany) Daniel Masur	(Austria) Alexander Erler (Spain) David Jordà Sanchis	7–6^{(9–7)}, 6–2
Win	23–12	Feb 2021	Quimper, France	Challenger	Hard (i)	(Germany) Daniel Masur	(United States) Brandon Nakashima (United States) Hunter Reese	6–2, 6–1
Win	24–12	Sep 2021	Biel/Bienne, Switzerland	Challenger	Hard (i)	(Germany) Daniel Masur	(Switzerland) Marc-Andrea Hüsler (Switzerland) Dominic Stricker	w/o
Loss	24–13	Nov 2021	Eckental, Germany	Challenger	Carpet (i)	(Germany) Daniel Masur	(Czech Republic) Roman Jebavý (United Kingdom) Jonny O'Mara	4–6, 5–7
Win	25–13	Jan 2022	Bendigo, Australia	Challenger	Hard	(Germany) Daniel Masur	(France) Enzo Couacaud (Slovenia) Blaž Rola	7–6^{(7–2)}, 6–4
Win	26–13	Feb 2022	Turin, Italy	Challenger	Hard (i)	(Germany) Daniel Masur	(Netherlands) Sander Arends (Netherlands) David Pel	3–6, 6–3, [10–8]
Win	27–13	Mar 2022	Lugano, Switzerland	Challenger	Hard (i)	(Germany) Daniel Masur	(Switzerland) Jérôme Kym (Switzerland) Leandro Riedi	6–4, 6–7^{(5–7)}, [10–7]

== Singles performance timeline ==
Key
W	F	SF	QF	#R	RR	Q#	DNQ	A	NH

(W) winner; (F) finalist; (SF) semifinalist; (QF) quarterfinalist; (#R) rounds 4, 3, 2, 1; (RR) round-robin stage; (Q#) qualification round; (DNQ) did not qualify; (A) absent; (NH) not held; (SR) strike rate (events won / competed); (W–L) win–loss record.
To avoid confusion and double counting, these charts are updated at the conclusion of a tournament or when the player's participation has ended.

Tournament	2009	2010	2011	2012	2013	2014	2015	2016	2017	2018	2019	2020	2021	2022	W–L
Grand Slam tournaments
Australian Open	Q1	Q1	A	Q1	1R	Q3	1R	Q3	Q1	2R	Q1	A	Q1	Q1	1–3
French Open	Q1	Q2	Q1	Q2	Q2	Q2	1R	Q2	Q1	2R	Q1	Q3	Q1		1–2
Wimbledon	Q3	Q1	1R	2R	Q3	Q2	1R	1R	3R	2R	1R	NH	Q2		4–7
US Open	Q2	Q3	Q2	Q2	Q1	Q2	3R	Q1	1R	1R	Q2	A	Q3		2–3
Win–loss	0–0	0–0	0–1	1–1	0–1	0–0	2–4	0–1	2–2	3–4	0–1	0–0	0–0	0–0	8–15

== Best Grand Slam results details ==
	Australian Open	
2018 Australian Open (qualifier)
Round	Opponent	Score
Q1	(Poland) Kamil Majchrzak	7–5, 5–7, 7–5
Q2	(Croatia) Viktor Galović	5–7, 6–3, 7–5
Q3	(South Korea) Lee Duck-hee	6–4, 6–4
1R	(France) Lucas Pouille (18)	6–4, 6–4, 6–7^{(4–7)}, 7–6^{(8–6)}
2R	(Georgia (country)) Nikoloz Basilashvili	5–7, 1–6, 3–6

	French Open	
2018 French Open (Lucky Loser)
Round	Opponent	Score
Q1	(France) Ugo Humbert (WC)	6–4, 6–7^{(6–8)}, 6–3
Q2	(Croatia) Nino Serdarušić	6–2, 6–3
Q3	(Brazil) Thomaz Bellucci	2–6, 6–2, 5–7
1R	(India) Yuki Bhambri	6–4, 6–4, 6–1
2R	(Estonia) Jürgen Zopp (LL)	6–4, 6–4, 3–6, 4–6, 4–6

	Wimbledon Championships	
2017 Wimbledon (qualifier)
Round	Opponent	Score
Q1	(France) Tristan Lamasine	3–6, 6–1, 6–3
Q2	(France) Mathias Bourgue	6–4, 3–6, 6–3
Q3	(Austria) Gerald Melzer (27)	6–4, 7–5, 6–3
1R	(Germany) Tommy Haas (WC)	6–2, 3–6, 6–3, 7–5
2R	(Russia) Daniil Medvedev	6–4, 6–2, 3–6, 2–6, 6–3
3R	(South Africa) Kevin Anderson	6–7^{(3–7)}, 4–6, 6–7^{(3–7)}

	US Open	
2015 US Open
Round	Opponent	Score
1R	(Luxembourg) Gilles Müller	6–4, 1–6, 6–4, 6–4
2R	(United States) Jack Sock (28)	4–6, 4–6, 6–3, 2–1 ret.
3R	(Switzerland) Stan Wawrinka (5)	3–6, 6–7^{(5–7)}, 4–6
