= James Cerretani =

American tennis player

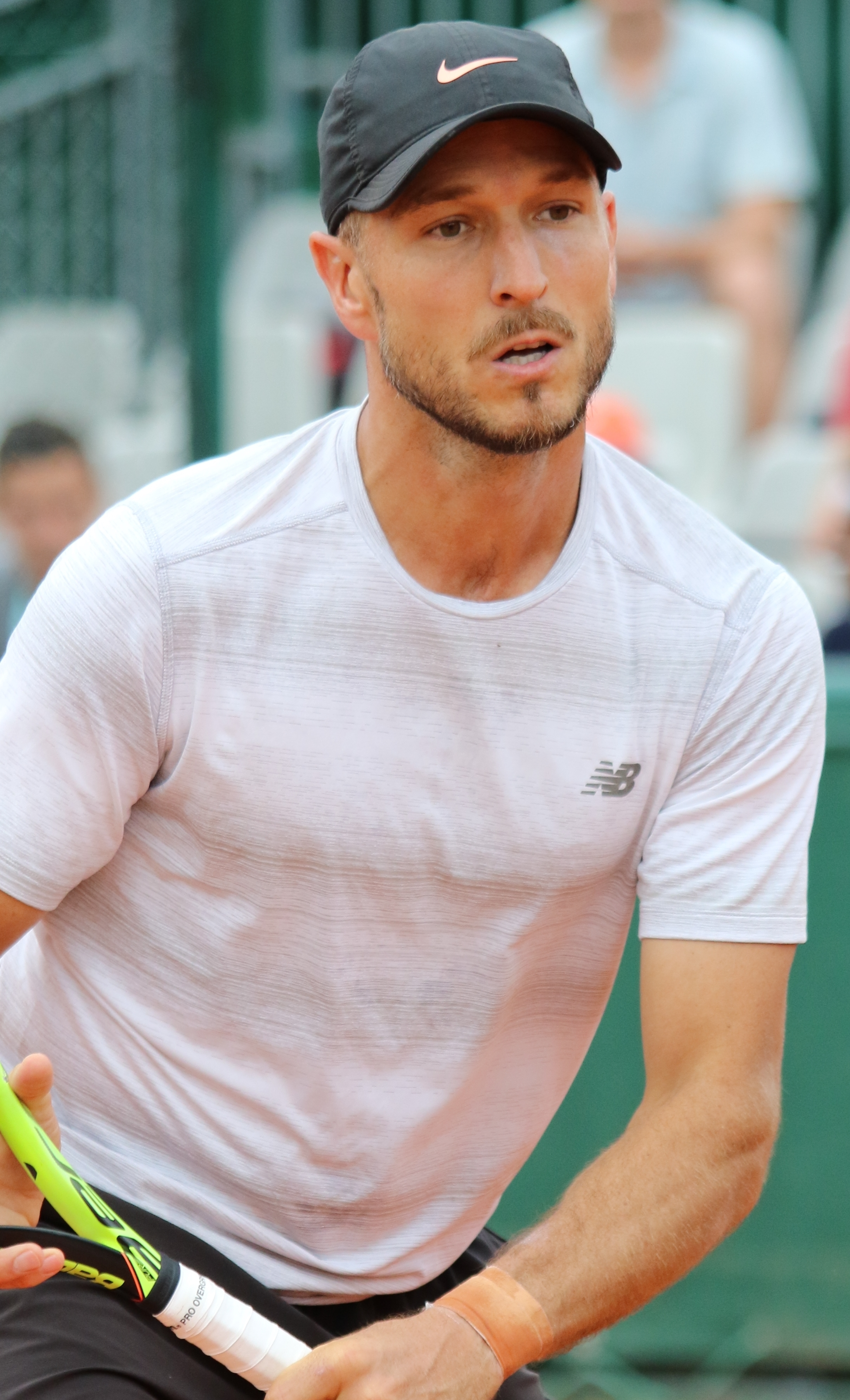
- Cerretani at the 2018 French Open
- Country (sports): United States
- Residence: Reading, Massachusetts, United States
- Born: October 2, 1981 (age 44) Reading, Massachusetts, United States
- Height: 6 ft 1 in (1.85 m)
- Turned pro: 2005
- Retired: July 2025 (last match played)
- Plays: Left-handed (one-handed backhand)
- Prize money: US $951,703

Singles
- Career record: 0-0
- Career titles: 0
- Highest ranking: No. 620 (October 23, 2006)

Doubles
- Career record: 95–164 (at ATP Tour level, Grand Slam level, and in Davis Cup)
- Career titles: 4
- Highest ranking: No. 45 (July 21, 2008)

Grand Slam doubles results
- Australian Open: 2R (2019)
- French Open: 3R (2018)
- Wimbledon: QF (2011, 2012)
- US Open: 2R (2011)

Grand Slam mixed doubles results
- Wimbledon: 2R (2009, 2018)
- US Open: 1R (2018, 2019)

Jamie Cerretani (born October 2, 1981) is an American inactive professional tennis player. A doubles specialist, he won four ATP World Tour titles in his career. He reached his career-high doubles ranking of World No. 45 on July 21, 2008 and a singles ranking of No. 620 achieved on October 23, 2006.

Cerretani attended Brown University, where he earned Ivy League Rookie of the Year honors in 2001 and graduated from Brown in 2004 with a degree in International Relations and Business Economics.

== ATP career finals ==
=== Doubles: 7 (4 titles, 3 runner-ups) ===
Legend (pre/post 2009) Grand Slam tournaments (0–0) Tennis Masters Cup / ATP World Tour Finals (0–0) ATP Masters Series / ATP World Tour Masters 1000 (0–0) ATP International Series Gold / ATP World Tour 500 Series (1–1) ATP International Series / ATP World Tour 250 Series (3–2)	Titles by surface Hard (2–2) Clay (2–1) Grass (0–0)	Titles by setting Outdoor (4–3) Indoor (0–0)

Result	W–L	Date	Tournament	Tier	Surface	Partner	Opponents	Score
Loss	0–1	May 2008	Grand Prix Hassan II, Morocco	International	Clay	(Australia) Todd Perry	(Spain) Albert Montañés (Spain) Santiago Ventura	1–6, 2–6
Win	1–1	Jul 2008	Austrian Open, Austria	Intl. Gold	Clay	(Romania) Victor Hănescu	(Argentina) Lucas Arnold Ker (Belgium) Olivier Rochus	6–3, 7–5
Win	2–1	Feb 2009	SA Tennis Open, South Africa	250 Series	Hard	(Belgium) Dick Norman	(South Africa) Rik de Voest (Australia) Ashley Fisher	6–7^{(7–9)}, 6–2, [14–12]
Win	3–1	Feb 2011	SA Tennis Open, South Africa (2)	250 Series	Hard	(Canada) Adil Shamasdin	(United States) Scott Lipsky (United States) Rajeev Ram	6–3, 3–6, [10–7]
Win	4–1	Feb 2017	Ecuador Open, Ecuador	250 Series	Clay	(Austria) Philipp Oswald	(Chile) Julio Peralta (Argentina) Horacio Zeballos	6−3, 2−1 ret.
Loss	4–2	Mar 2018	Dubai Tennis Championships, UAE	500 Series	Hard	(India) Leander Paes	(Netherlands) Jean-Julien Rojer (Romania) Horia Tecău	2–6, 6–7^{(2–7)}
Loss	4–3	Aug 2018	Winston-Salem Open, United States	250 Series	Hard	(India) Leander Paes	(Netherlands) Jean-Julien Rojer (Romania) Horia Tecău	4–6, 2–6

== Challenger and Futures finals ==
=== Singles: 1 (0–1) ===
Legend (singles) ATP Challenger Tour (0–0) ITF Futures Tour (0–1)	Titles by surface Hard (0–1) Clay (0–0) Grass (0–0) Carpet (0–0)

Result	W–L	Date	Tournament	Tier	Surface	Opponent	Score
Loss	0–1	May 2006	Greece F2, Syros	Futures	Hard	(United Kingdom) Jonathan Marray	4–6, 3–6

=== Doubles: 63 (28–35) ===
Legend (doubles) ATP Challenger Tour (21–27) ITF Futures Tour (7–8)	Titles by surface Hard (17–17) Clay (9–16) Grass (0–1) Carpet (2–1)

Result	W–L	Date	Tournament	Tier	Surface	Partner	Opponents	Score
Loss	0–1	Nov 2005	South Africa F2, Pretoria	Futures	Hard	(South Africa) Jason Pieters	(South Africa) Andrew Anderson (South Africa) Stephen Mitchell	3–6, 4–6
Loss	0–2	Jan 2006	El Salvador F1, Nueva San Salvador	Futures	Clay	(Israel) Victor Kolik	(Argentina) Eduardo Schwank (Uruguay) Martín Vilarrubí	2–6, 7–5, 0–6
Win	1–2	Mar 2006	China F5, Guangzhou	Futures	Hard	(Netherlands) Jesse Huta Galung	(China) Li Zhe (China) Xue Feng	4–6, 6–3, 7–6^{(7–3)}
Loss	1–3	Jun 2006	Finland F1, Vierumäki	Futures	Clay	(Kuwait) Abdullah Maqdes	(Estonia) Mait Künnap (Spain) Jordi Marsé-Vidri	4–6, 2–6
Win	2–3	Sep 2006	Italy F31, Porto Torres	Futures	Hard	(United States) Brian Wilson	(Slovakia) Viktor Bruthans (Italy) Marco Pedrini	6–2, 6–3
Loss	2–4	Oct 2006	Australia F10, Traralgon	Futures	Hard	(United States) Philip Stolt	(Australia) Matthew Ebden (Australia) Brydan Klein	3–6, 3–6
Win	3–4	Oct 2006	Australia F11, Melbourne	Futures	Hard	(United States) Philip Stolt	(Australia) Yuri Bezeruk (Australia) David Jeflea	6–2, 5–7, [10–7]
Loss	3–5	Oct 2006	Australia F12, Mildura	Futures	Grass	(Australia) Sadik Kadir	(Australia) Carsten Ball (Australia) Adam Feeney	6–4, 6–7^{(4–7)}, [9–11]
Loss	3–6	Jan 2007	USA F1, Tampa	Futures	Hard	(Mexico) Antonio Ruiz-Rosales	(India) Somdev Devvarman (United States) Treat Huey	0–6, 6–7^{(7–9)}
Loss	3–7	Jan 2007	USA F2, North Miami Beach	Futures	Hard	(Mexico) Antonio Ruiz-Rosales	(United States) Tim Smyczek (United States) Ryan Sweeting	3–6, 2–6
Loss	3–8	Feb 2007	Australia F2, Sydney	Futures	Hard	(New Zealand) Daniel King-Turner	(Australia) Luke Bourgeois (Australia) Adam Feeney	6–7^{(3–7)}, 2–6
Win	4–8	Mar 2007	New Zealand F2, Hamilton	Futures	Hard	(New Zealand) Daniel King-Turner	(Australia) Carsten Ball (Australia) Dane Fernandez	6–7^{(11–13)}, 7–6^{(7–5)}, 6–2
Win	5–8	May 2007	Great Britain F9, Bournemouth	Futures	Clay	(France) Olivier Charroin	(United Kingdom) Ian Flanagan (United Kingdom) Tom Rushby	6–2, 6–4
Win	6–8	May 2007	Greece F1, Kos	Futures	Hard	(Germany) Ralph Grambow	(El Salvador) Rafael Arévalo (Togo) Komlavi Loglo	6–3, 6–4
Win	7–8	May 2007	Greece F3, Kalamata	Futures	Carpet	(Netherlands) Antal van der Duim	(United States) Patrick Briaud (Brazil) Márcio Torres	6–3, 6–2
Loss	7–9	Aug 2007	San Marino, San Marino	Challenger	Clay	(Poland) Tomasz Bednarek	(Uruguay) Pablo Cuevas (Argentina) Juan Pablo Guzmán	1–6, 0–6
Loss	7–10	Sep 2007	Geneva, Switzerland	Challenger	Clay	(France) Olivier Charroin	(Argentina) Sebastián Decoud (Russia) Yuri Schukin	3–6, 7–6^{(7–4)}, [4–10]
Win	8–10	Sep 2007	Orléans, France	Challenger	Hard (i)	(Germany) Frank Moser	(Poland) Tomasz Bednarek (Poland) Michał Przysiężny	6–1, 7–6^{(7–2)}
Win	9–10	Feb 2008	Wrocław, Poland	Challenger	Hard (i)	(Czech Republic) Lukáš Rosol	(Austria) Werner Eschauer (Austria) Jürgen Melzer	6–7^{(7–9)}, 6–3, [10–7]
Loss	9–11	Feb 2008	Bergamo, Italy	Challenger	Hard (i)	(Slovakia) Igor Zelenay	(Italy) Simone Bolelli (Italy) Andreas Seppi	3–6, 0–6
Loss	9–12	Jul 2008	Córdoba, Spain	Challenger	Hard	(Belgium) Dick Norman	(Sweden) Johan Brunström (Netherlands Antilles) Jean-Julien Rojer	4–6, 3–6
Win	10–12	Aug 2009	Cordenons, Italy	Challenger	Clay	(United States) Travis Rettenmaier	(Australia) Peter Luczak (Italy) Alessandro Motti	4–6, 6–3, [11–9]
Loss	10–13	Mar 2010	Marrakech, Morocco	Challenger	Clay	(Canada) Adil Shamasdin	(Serbia) Ilija Bozoljac (Romania) Horia Tecău	1–6, 1–6
Loss	10–14	May 2010	Tunis, Tunisia	Challenger	Clay	(Canada) Adil Shamasdin	(South Africa) Jeff Coetzee (Belgium) Kristof Vliegen	6–7^{(3–7)}, 3–6
Win	11–14	May 2010	Biella, Italy	Challenger	Clay	(Canada) Adil Shamasdin	(Jamaica) Dustin Brown (Italy) Alessandro Motti	6–3, 2–6, [11–9]
Loss	11–15	Jun 2010	Milan, Italy	Challenger	Clay	(South Africa) Jeff Coetzee	(Italy) Daniele Bracciali (Spain) Rubén Ramírez Hidalgo	4–6, 5–7
Loss	11–16	Jul 2010	Poznań, Poland	Challenger	Clay	(Canada) Adil Shamasdin	(Portugal) Rui Machado (Spain) Daniel Muñoz de la Nava	2–6, 3–6
Loss	11–17	Aug 2010	Cordenons, Italy	Challenger	Clay	(Canada) Adil Shamasdin	(Netherlands) Robin Haase (Netherlands) Rogier Wassen	6–7^{(14–16)}, 5–7
Loss	11–18	Aug 2010	San Marino, San Marino	Challenger	Clay	(Switzerland) Yves Allegro	(Italy) Daniele Bracciali (Croatia) Lovro Zovko	6–2, 2–6, [5–10]
Win	12–18	Sep 2010	Banja Luka, Bosnia/Herzegovina	Challenger	Clay	(Czech Republic) David Škoch	(Canada) Adil Shamasdin (Croatia) Lovro Zovko	6–1, 6–4
Win	13–18	Feb 2011	Quimper, France	Challenger	Hard (i)	(Canada) Adil Shamasdin	(United Kingdom) Jamie Delgado (United Kingdom) Jonathan Marray	6–3, 5–7, [10–5]
Loss	13–19	Mar 2011	Marrakech, Morocco	Challenger	Clay	(Canada) Adil Shamasdin	(Australia) Peter Luczak (Italy) Alessandro Motti	6–7^{(5–7)}, 6–7^{(3–7)}
Win	14–19	Aug 2011	San Marino, San Marino	Challenger	Clay	(Germany) Philipp Marx	(Italy) Daniele Bracciali (Austria) Julian Knowle	6–3, 6–4
Loss	14–20	Nov 2011	Eckental, Germany	Challenger	Carpet (i)	(Canada) Adil Shamasdin	(Germany) Andre Begemann (Russia) Alexander Kudryavtsev	2–6, 6–3, [9–11]
Loss	14–21	Nov 2011	Geneva, Switzerland	Challenger	Hard	(Canada) Adil Shamasdin	(Russia) Igor Andreev (Russia) Evgeny Donskoy	6–7^{(1–7)}, 6–7^{(2–7)}
Loss	14–22	Nov 2011	Helsinki, Finland	Challenger	Hard (i)	(Slovakia) Michal Mertiňák	(Germany) Martin Emmrich (Sweden) Andreas Siljeström	4–6, 4–6
Win	15–22	Mar 2012	Guadalajara, Mexico	Challenger	Hard	(Canada) Adil Shamasdin	(Poland) Tomasz Bednarek (France) Olivier Charroin	7–6^{(7–5)}, 6–1
Win	16–22	Nov 2012	Eckental, Germany	Challenger	Carpet (i)	(Canada) Adil Shamasdin	(Poland) Tomasz Bednarek (Sweden) Andreas Siljeström	6–3, 2–6, [10–4]
Win	17–22	Nov 2012	Loughborough, Great Britain	Challenger	Hard (i)	(Canada) Adil Shamasdin	(India) Purav Raja (India) Divij Sharan	6–4, 7–5
Win	18–22	Jan 2013	São Paulo, Brazil	Challenger	Hard	(Canada) Adil Shamasdin	(Argentina) Federico Delbonis (Argentina) Renzo Olivo	6–7^{(5–7)}, 6–1, [11–9]
Loss	18–23	Apr 2013	São Paulo, Brazil	Challenger	Clay	(France) Pierre-Hugues Herbert	(Brazil) Marcelo Demoliner (Brazil) João Souza	4–6, 6–3, [6–10]
Loss	18–24	Aug 2013	Vancouver, Canada	Challenger	Hard	(Canada) Adil Shamasdin	(Israel) Jonathan Erlich (Israel) Andy Ram	1–6, 4–6
Loss	18–25	Jun 2014	Milan, Italy	Challenger	Clay	(Germany) Frank Moser	(Argentina) Guillermo Durán (Argentina) Máximo González	3–6, 3–6
Loss	18–26	Sep 2014	Orléans, France	Challenger	Hard (i)	(Sweden) Andreas Siljeström	(Brazil) Thomaz Bellucci (Brazil) André Sá	7–5, 4–6, [8–10]
Win	19–26	Apr 2015	Le Gosier, Guadeloupe	Challenger	Hard	(Netherlands) Antal van der Duim	(Netherlands) Wesley Koolhof (Netherlands) Matwé Middelkoop	6–1, 6–3
Loss	19–27	Jun 2015	Perugia, Italy	Challenger	Clay	(Romania) Costin Pavăl	(Argentina) Andrea Collarini (Argentina) Andrés Molteni	3–6, 5–7
Win	20–27	Mar 2016	Drummondville, Canada	Challenger	Hard (i)	(United States) Max Schnur	(United Kingdom) Daniel Evans (United Kingdom) Lloyd Glasspool	3–6, 6–3, [11–9]
Loss	20–28	Apr 2016	Saint Brieuc, France	Challenger	Hard (i)	(Netherlands) Antal van der Duim	(Australia) Rameez Junaid (Sweden) Andreas Siljeström	7–5, 6–7^{(4–7)}, [8–10]
Win	21–28	Apr 2016	Le Gosier, Guadeloupe	Challenger	Hard	(Netherlands) Antal van der Duim	(United States) Austin Krajicek (United States) Mitchell Krueger	6–2, 5–7, [10–8]
Win	22–28	Jul 2016	Marburg, Germany	Challenger	Clay	(Austria) Philipp Oswald	(Mexico) Miguel Ángel Reyes-Varela (United States) Max Schnur	6–3, 6–2
Win	23–28	Jul 2016	Braunschweig, Germany	Challenger	Clay	(Austria) Philipp Oswald	(Poland) Mateusz Kowalczyk (Croatia) Antonio Šančić	4–6, 7–6^{(7–5)}, [10–2]
Win	24–28	Aug 2016	Cortina d'Ampezzo, Italy	Challenger	Clay	(Austria) Philipp Oswald	(Spain) Roberto Carballés Baena (Chile) Christian Garín	6–3, 6–2
Loss	24–29	Oct 2016	Budapest, Hungary	Challenger	Hard (i)	(Austria) Philipp Oswald	(Belarus) Aliaksandr Bury (Sweden) Andreas Siljeström	6–7^{(3–7)}, 4–6
Win	25–29	Jun 2017	Caltanissetta, Italy	Challenger	Clay	(United States) Max Schnur	(Ukraine) Denys Molchanov (Croatia) Franko Škugor	6–3, 3–6, [10–6]
Win	26–29	Aug 2017	Vancouver, Canada	Challenger	Hard	(United Kingdom) Neal Skupski	(Philippines) Treat Huey (Sweden) Robert Lindstedt	7–6^{(8–6)}, 6–2
Loss	26–30	Nov 2017	Knoxville, USA	Challenger	Hard (i)	(Australia) John-Patrick Smith	(India) Leander Paes (India) Purav Raja	6–7^{(4–7)}, 6–7^{(4–7)}
Win	27–30	Jan 2018	Bangkok, Thailand	Challenger	Hard	(United Kingdom) Joe Salisbury	(Spain) Enrique López Pérez (Spain) Pedro Martínez	6–7^{(5–7)}, 6–3, [10–8]
Win	28–30	Jan 2018	Newport Beach, USA	Challenger	Hard	(India) Leander Paes	(Philippines) Treat Huey (United States) Denis Kudla	6–4, 7–5
Loss	28–31	Nov 2018	Houston, USA	Challenger	Hard	(El Salvador) Marcelo Arévalo	(United States) Austin Krajicek (United States) Nicholas Monroe	6–4, 6–7^{(3–7)}, [5–10]
Loss	28–32	Jan 2021	Quimper, France	Challenger	Hard (i)	(Switzerland) Marc-Andrea Hüsler	(France) Grégoire Barrère (France) Albano Olivetti	7–5, 6–7^{(7–9)}, [8–10]
Loss	28–33	Oct 2021	Sibiu, Romania	Challenger	Clay	(Switzerland) Luca Margaroli	(Austria) Alexander Erler (Austria) Lucas Miedler	3–6, 1–6
Loss	28–34	Dec 2021	Rio de Janeiro, Brazil	Challenger	Hard	(Brazil) Fernando Romboli	(Brazil) Orlando Luz (Brazil) Rafael Matos	3–6, 6–7^{(2–7)}
Loss	28–35	Apr 2025	Tallahassee, US	Challenger	Clay (green)	(United States) George Goldhoff	(Canada) Liam Draxl (Canada) Cleeve Harper	2–6, 3–6

== Doubles performance timeline ==
Key
W	F	SF	QF	#R	RR	Q#	DNQ	A	NH

(W) winner; (F) finalist; (SF) semifinalist; (QF) quarterfinalist; (#R) rounds 4, 3, 2, 1; (RR) round-robin stage; (Q#) qualification round; (DNQ) did not qualify; (A) absent; (NH) not held; (SR) strike rate (events won / competed); (W–L) win–loss record.
To avoid confusion and double counting, these charts are updated at the conclusion of a tournament or when the player's participation has ended.

This table is current through 2019 US Open.

Tournament	2008	2009	2010	2011	2012	2013	2014	2015	2016	2017	2018	2019	W–L
Grand Slam tournaments
Australian Open	A	1R	1R	A	1R	1R	A	A	A	1R	1R	2R	1–7
French Open	A	2R	1R	1R	2R	1R	A	A	A	1R	3R	A	4–7
Wimbledon	2R	2R	1R	QF	QF	A	A	Q1	Q1	1R	1R	A	8–7
US Open	1R	1R	A	2R	1R	A	A	A	A	1R	1R	A	1–6
Win–loss	1–2	2–4	0–3	4–3	4–4	0–2	0–0	0–0	0–0	0–4	2–4	1–1	14–27
