= Open de Guadeloupe =

Defunct tennis tournament
- Location: Le Gosier, Guadeloupe
- Venue: Ligue de Tennis Guadeloupe
- Category: ATP Challenger Tour
- Surface: Hard
- Draw: 32S/16D
- Prize money: €100,000+H
- Website: Website

The Open de Guadeloupe (formerly known as Open de la Region Guadeloupe and Orange Open Guadeloupe) was a tennis tournament held in Le Gosier, Guadeloupe between 2011 and 2018. The event was part of the ATP Challenger Tour and was played on clay courts.

== Past finals ==
=== Singles ===
Year	Champion	Runner-up	Score
2018	(Serbia) Dušan Lajović	(United States) Denis Kudla	6–4, 6–0
2016	(Tunisia) Malek Jaziri	(United States) Stefan Kozlov	6–2, 6–4
2015	(Belgium) Ruben Bemelmans	(France) Édouard Roger-Vasselin	7–6^{(8–6)}, 6–3
2014	(United States) Steve Johnson	(France) Kenny de Schepper	6–1, 6–7^{(5–7)}, 7–6^{(7–2)}
2013	(France) Benoît Paire	(Ukraine) Sergiy Stakhovsky	6–4, 5–7, 6–4
2012	(Belgium) David Goffin	(Germany) Mischa Zverev	6–2, 6–2
2011	(Belgium) Olivier Rochus	(France) Stéphane Robert	6–2, 6–3

=== Doubles ===
Year	Champions	Runners-up	Score
2018	(United Kingdom) Neal Skupski (Australia) John-Patrick Smith	(Belgium) Ruben Bemelmans (France) Jonathan Eysseric	7–6^{(7–3)}, 6–4
2016	(United States) James Cerretani (Netherlands) Antal van der Duim	(United States) Austin Krajicek (United States) Mitchell Krueger	6–2, 5–7, [10–8]
2015	(United States) James Cerretani (Netherlands) Antal van der Duim	(Netherlands) Wesley Koolhof (Netherlands) Matwé Middelkoop	6–1, 6–3
2014	(Poland) Tomasz Bednarek (Canada) Adil Shamasdin	(Germany) Gero Kretschmer (New Zealand) Michael Venus	7–5, 6–7^{(5–7)}, [10–8]
2013	(Israel) Dudi Sela (Chinese Taipei) Jimmy Wang	(Germany) Philipp Marx (Romania) Florin Mergea	6–1, 6–2
2012	(France) Pierre-Hugues Herbert (France) Albano Olivetti	(Australia) Paul Hanley (Australia) Jordan Kerr	7–5, 1–6, [10–7]
2011	(Italy) Riccardo Ghedin (France) Stéphane Robert	(France) Arnaud Clément (Belgium) Olivier Rochus	6–2, 5–7, [10–7]
