= Gianni Mina =

French professional tennis player

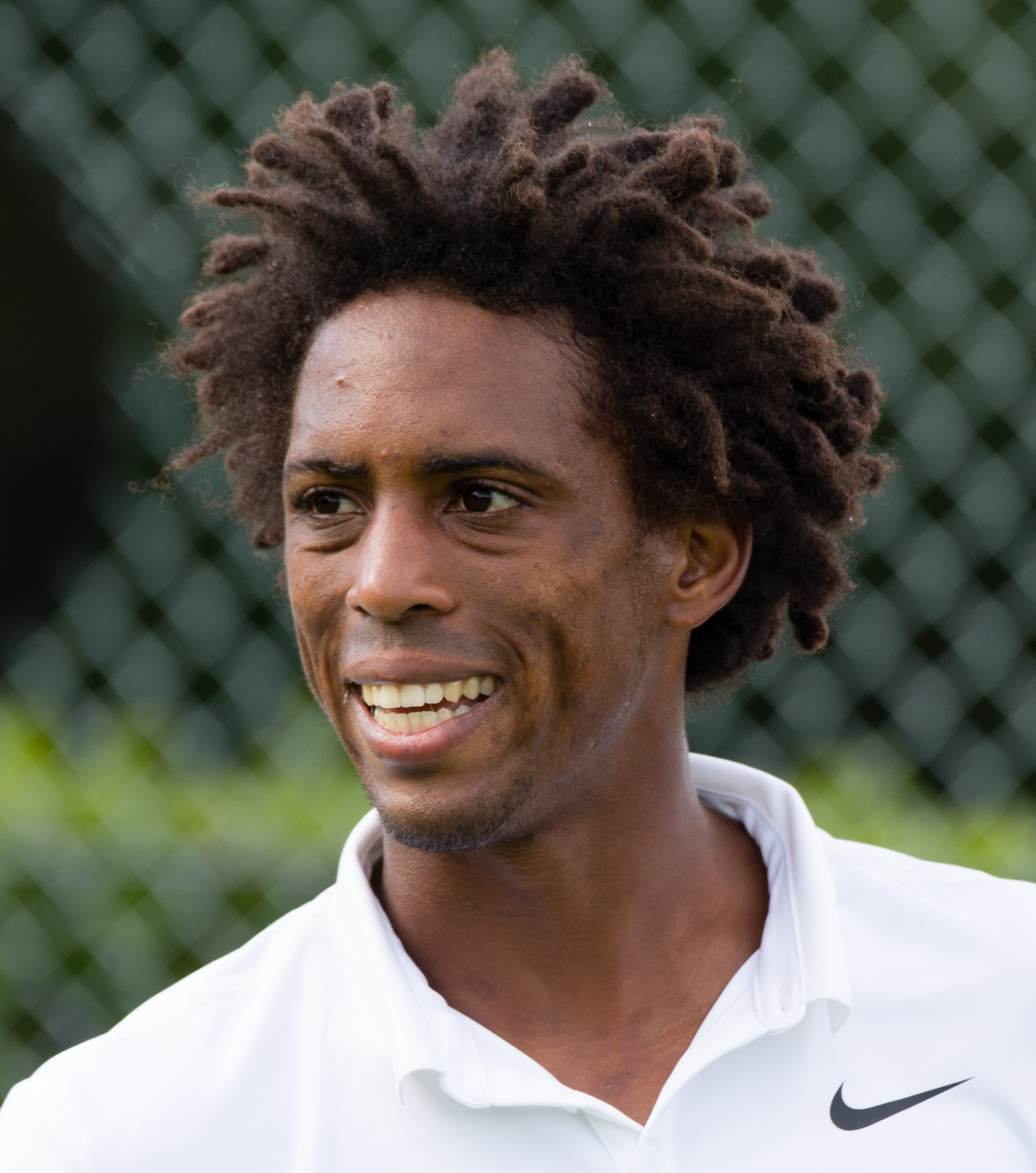
- Mina at the 2015 Wimbledon qualifying tournament
- Country (sports): France
- Residence: France
- Born: 9 February 1992 (age 34) Les Abymes, Guadeloupe, France
- Height: 1.85 m (6 ft 1 in)
- Plays: Right-handed (two-handed backhand)
- Prize money: $104,996

Singles
- Career record: 1–4
- Career titles: 0
- Highest ranking: No. 219 (25 May 2015)

Grand Slam singles results
- Australian Open: Q1 (2015)
- French Open: 1R (2010)
- Wimbledon: Q1 (2015)

Doubles
- Career record: 0–0
- Career titles: 0
- Highest ranking: No. 646 (7 November 2011)

Grand Slam doubles results
- French Open: 1R (2015)
- Australian Open Junior: 2R (2010)
- French Open Junior: 2R (2009)
- US Open Junior: 1R (2009)
- Last updated on: 24 May 2015.

Gianni Mina (born 9 February 1992 in Les Abymes, Guadeloupe, France) is a French former professional tennis player.

== Tennis career ==
=== Juniors ===
On the junior circuit, Mina reached the No. 1 combined world ranking in March 2010. He finished runner-up to eventual 2009 International Tennis Federation (ITF) World Junior Champion Daniel Berta in the 2009 French Open final; won international junior tournaments in Beaulieu-sur-Mer and Istres, and the Boys' 18s singles at the year-end Dunlop Orange Bowl in Key Biscayne, becoming the second Frenchman to win the title in the event's history, after Guy Forget in 1982.

== Pro tour ==
He reached his highest ATP rankings of World No. 219 in singles in May 2015, and World No. 646 in doubles in November 2011. Mina is coached by former French players Aloïs Beust and Olivier Ramos. Mina was given a wildcard for the 2010 French Open where he lost in the first round to four-time champion Rafael Nadal in three consecutive sets.

Mina has been given the nickname "Baby Monfils" because of his similar appearance to fellow Frenchman and professional tennis player Gaël Monfils. He announced his retirement from tennis via an Instagram post on May 27, 2021.

== Career titles ==
=== Singles (3) ===
Legend
Futures (3)

No.	Date	Tournament	Surface	Opponent in the final	Score in the final
1.	29 March 2010	Antalya, Turkey	Clay	(Spain) Gerard Granollers	6–3, 6–1
2.	8 November 2010	Antalya, Turkey	Clay	(Germany) Alexander Flock	6–3, 6–3
3.	20 June 2011	Toulon, France	Clay	(Serbia) Miljan Zekić	7–6^{(7–4)}, 6–4
