= 2013 Ethias Trophy – Singles =

Singles
- 2013 Ethias Trophy

Final
- Champion: (Czech Republic) Radek Štěpánek
- Runner-up: (Netherlands) Igor Sijsling
- Score: 6–3, 7–5

Events
| Singles | Doubles |
| ← 2012 · | Ethias Trophy | · 2014 → |

Kenny de Schepper was the defending champion, but lost in the first round to Dustin Brown.

Radek Štěpánek won the title, defeating Igor Sijsling in the final, 6–3, 7–5.

== Seeds ==
1. (Czech Republic) Radek Štěpánek (champion)
2. (France) Kenny de Schepper (first round)
3. (Netherlands) Igor Sijsling (final)
4. (Germany) Tobias Kamke (second round)
5. (Ukraine) Sergiy Stakhovsky (second round)
6. (Argentina) Leonardo Mayer (first round, retired)
7. (Netherlands) Jesse Huta Galung (first round)
8. (Kazakhstan) Mikhail Kukushkin (second round)

== Draw ==
=== Key ===
- Q = Qualifier
- WC = Wild card
- LL = Lucky loser
- Alt = Alternate
- SE = Special exempt
- PR = Protected ranking
- ITF = ITF entry
- JE = Junior exempt
- w/o = Walkover
- r = Retired
- d = Defaulted
- SR = Special ranking

=== Finals ===
Semifinals
1 | (Czech Republic) Radek Štěpánek | 6 | 6
(France) Marc Gicquel | 4 | 1
3 | (Netherlands) Igor Sijsling | 6 | 5 | 6
PR | (Germany) Andreas Beck | 4 | 7 | 4

Final
1 | (Czech Republic) Radek Štěpánek | 6 | 7
3 | (Netherlands) Igor Sijsling | 3 | 5

=== Top half ===
First round
1 | (Czech Republic) R Štěpánek | 6 | 6
Q | (Italy) L Giustino | 4 | 2
Q | (Belgium) M Authom | 4 | 6 | 6
(Germany) J-L Struff | 6 | 2 | 2
(Romania) A Ungur | 6 | 7^{7}
SE | (France) P-H Herbert | 4 | 6^{2}
(Belgium) X Malisse | 3 | 6^{4}
5 | (Ukraine) S Stakhovsky | 6 | 7^{7}
4 | (Germany) T Kamke | 7^{10} | 3 | 7
(Russia) T Gabashvili | 6^{8} | 6 | 5
WC | (Belgium) O Rochus | 2 | 6 | 2
(France) M Gicquel | 6 | 3 | 6
(France) P-H Mathieu | 6 | 3 | 7^{7}
Alt | (Ukraine) I Marchenko | 3 | 6 | 6^{2}
SE | (Czech Republic) J Pospíšil | 6 | 6
7 | (Netherlands) J Huta Galung | 4 | 1

Second round
1 | (Czech Republic) R Štěpánek | 6 | 6
Q | (Belgium) M Authom | 3 | 2
(Romania) A Ungur | 6 | 2 | 6
5 | (Ukraine) S Stakhovsky | 4 | 6 | 4
4 | (Germany) T Kamke | 6^{4} | 4
(France) M Gicquel | 7^{7} | 6
(France) P-H Mathieu | 6 | 2 | 6
SE | (Czech Republic) J Pospíšil | 4 | 6 | 4

Quarterfinals
1 | (Czech Republic) R Štěpánek | 7^{7} | 6
(Romania) A Ungur | 6^{5} | 4
(France) M Gicquel | 7^{7} | 7^{7}
(France) P-H Mathieu | 6^{5} | 6^{9}

Semifinals
1 | (Czech Republic) R Štěpánek | 6 | 6
(France) M Gicquel | 4 | 1

=== Bottom half ===
First round
6 | (Argentina) L Mayer | 6^{2} | 0^{r}
WC | (Belgium) R Bemelmans | 7^{7} | 1
WC | (Belgium) G Gigounon | 3 | 3
Q | (Slovakia) N Gomboš | 6 | 6
(Lithuania) R Berankis | 6 | 3 | 3
WC | (Belgium) S Darcis | 2 | 6 | 6
(Slovakia) A Martin | 0 | 2
3 | (Netherlands) I Sijsling | 6 | 6
8 | (Kazakhstan) M Kukushkin | 7 | 7
(Romania) M Copil | 5 | 5
(Austria) A Haider-Maurer | 5 | 6 | 3
PR | (Germany) A Beck | 7 | 3 | 6
(Canada) F Dancevic | 5 | 3
Q | (Germany) M Bachinger | 7 | 6
(Germany) D Brown | 6 | 6
2 | (France) K de Schepper | 4 | 2

Second round
WC | (Belgium) R Bemelmans | 7^{10} | 3 | 4
Q | (Slovakia) N Gomboš | 6^{8} | 6 | 6
WC | (Belgium) S Darcis | 5 | 1
3 | (Netherlands) I Sijsling | 7 | 6
8 | (Kazakhstan) M Kukushkin | 3 | 4
PR | (Germany) A Beck | 6 | 6
Q | (Germany) M Bachinger | 6 | 5 | 7^{7}
(Germany) D Brown | 1 | 7 | 6^{3}

Quarterfinals
Q | (Slovakia) N Gomboš | 3 | 4
3 | (Netherlands) I Sijsling | 6 | 6
PR | (Germany) A Beck | 7 | 6^{6} | 6
Q | (Germany) M Bachinger | 5 | 7^{8} | 2

Semifinals
3 | (Netherlands) I Sijsling | 6 | 5 | 6
PR | (Germany) A Beck | 4 | 7 | 4
