= 2015 Ethias Trophy – Singles =

Singles
- 2015 Ethias Trophy
- 2014 Champion: (Belgium) David Goffin

Events
Singles	Doubles
← 2014 ·	Ethias Trophy	· 2016 →

David Goffin was the defending champion, but chose to compete in the China Open.

== Seeds ==
1. (Belgium) Steve Darcis (first round)
2. (Poland) Jerzy Janowicz (withdrew due to left knee injury)
3. (Germany) Benjamin Becker (final)
4. (Spain) Marcel Granollers (first round)
5. (Turkey) Marsel İlhan (first round)
6. (Tunisia) Malek Jaziri (first round)
7. (Belgium) Ruben Bemelmans (first round)
8. (France) Paul-Henri Mathieu (second round)

== Draw ==
=== Key ===
- Q = Qualifier
- WC = Wild card
- LL = Lucky loser
- Alt = Alternate
- SE = Special exempt
- PR = Protected ranking
- ITF = ITF entry
- JE = Junior exempt
- w/o = Walkover
- r = Retired
- d = Defaulted
- SR = Special ranking

=== Finals ===
Semifinals
(Ukraine) Illya Marchenko	7^{7}	6
(Germany) Jan-Lennard Struff	6^{5}	3
3/SE	(Germany) Benjamin Becker	6^{4}	7^{7}	7^{7}
(France) Kenny de Schepper	7^{7}	6^{4}	6^{5}

Final
(Ukraine) Illya Marchenko	6	6^{8}	6
3/SE	(Germany) Benjamin Becker	2	7^{10}	4

=== Top half ===
First round
1	(Belgium) S Darcis	7	3	3
Q	(France) M Teixeira	5	6	6
(Ukraine) I Marchenko	6	6
WC	(Belgium) G Gigounon	3	2
(Sweden) E Ymer	7^{7}	6^{3}	6
WC	(Belgium) N Desein	6^{5}	7^{7}	3
(Russia) K Kravchuk	6	6
5	(Turkey) M İlhan	4	4
4	(Spain) M Granollers	5	3
(Germany) J-L Struff	7	6
LL	(Russia) A Karatsev	5	4
(Bosnia and Herzegovina) M Bašić	7	6
(Kazakhstan) A Golubev	3	4
(Slovakia) L Lacko	6	6
SE	(Austria) D Novak	7^{7}	4	7^{7}
6	(Tunisia) M Jaziri	6^{4}	6	6^{3}

Second round
Q	(France) M Teixeira	4	1
(Ukraine) I Marchenko	6	6
(Sweden) E Ymer	6^{10}	6^{5}
(Russia) K Kravchuk	7^{12}	7^{7}
(Germany) J-L Struff	7^{7}	6
(Bosnia and Herzegovina) M Bašić	6^{2}	4
(Slovakia) L Lacko	6^{4}	3
SE	(Austria) D Novak	7^{7}	6

Quarterfinals
(Ukraine) I Marchenko	7	6
(Russia) K Kravchuk	5	3
(Germany) J-L Struff	7	6
SE	(Austria) D Novak	5	1

Semifinals
(Ukraine) I Marchenko	7^{7}	6
(Germany) J-L Struff	6^{5}	3

=== Bottom half ===
First round
8	(France) P-H Mathieu	6	7
Q	(Belgium) Y Mertens	4	5
WC	(Belgium) Clement Geens	6	6^{6}	1
(Italy) A Arnaboldi	4	7^{8}	6
Q	(France) Maxime Tabatruong	6	6
WC	(Belgium) M Authom	3	3
LL	(France) S Doumbia	4	3
3/SE	(Germany) B Becker	6	6
7	(Belgium) R Bemelmans	5	6	3
(France) K de Schepper	7	3	6
(Italy) L Vanni	3	4
(Slovakia) N Gombos	6	6
(Australia) J-P Smith	6^{3}	4
(United Kingdom) J Ward	7^{7}	6
(Croatia) I Dodig	6^{4}	6	6^{4}
Q	(Russia) K Khachanov	7^{7}	3	7^{7}

Second round
8	(France) P-H Mathieu	2	6	3
(Italy) A Arnaboldi	6	1	6
Q	(France) M Tabatruong	3	2
3/SE	(Germany) B Becker	6	6
(France) K de Schepper	7^{8}	6
(Slovakia) N Gombos	6^{6}	3
(United Kingdom) J Ward	1	6	2
Q	(Russia) K Khachanov	6	4	6

Quarterfinals
(Italy) A Arnaboldi	2	4
3/SE	(Germany) B Becker	6	6
(France) K de Schepper	2	6	6
Q	(Russia) K Khachanov	6	3	1

Semifinals
3/SE	(Germany) B Becker	6^{4}	7^{7}	7^{7}
(France) K de Schepper	7^{7}	6^{4}	6^{5}
