= 2010 Ethias Trophy – Doubles =

Doubles
- 2010 Ethias Trophy

Final
- Champions: (Slovakia) Filip Polášek (Slovakia) Igor Zelenay
- Runners-up: (Belgium) Ruben Bemelmans (Belgium) Yannick Mertens
- Score: 3–6, 6–4, [10–5]

Events
Singles	Doubles
← 2009 ·	Ethias Trophy	· 2011 →

Denis Istomin and Evgeny Korolev did not defend their 2009 title.
Top seed Filip Polášek and Igor Zelenay won in the final 3–6, 6–4, [10–5], against Ruben Bemelmans and Yannick Mertens.

== Seeds ==
1. (Slovakia) Filip Polášek / (Slovakia) Igor Zelenay (champions)
2. (Sweden) Johan Brunström / (United States) Scott Lipsky (quarterfinals)
3. (Serbia) Dušan Vemić / (Croatia) Lovro Zovko (first round)
4. (Jamaica) Dustin Brown / (Netherlands) Rogier Wassen (first round)

== Draw ==
=== Key ===
- Q = Qualifier
- WC = Wild card
- LL = Lucky loser
- Alt = Alternate
- SE = Special exempt
- PR = Protected ranking
- ITF = ITF entry
- JE = Junior exempt
- w/o = Walkover
- r = Retired
- d = Defaulted
- SR = Special ranking

=== Draw ===
First round
1	(Slovakia) Filip Polášek (Slovakia) Igor Zelenay	6	7
(Poland) Tomasz Bednarek (Canada) Frank Dancevic	2	6^{2}
(India) Harsh Mankad (United States) David Martin	4	4
(Germany) Frank Moser (Czech Republic) David Škoch	6	6
3	(Serbia) Dušan Vemić (Croatia) Lovro Zovko	2	5
(Thailand) Sanchai Ratiwatana (Thailand) Sonchat Ratiwatana	6	7
(Slovakia) Karol Beck (Czech Republic) Leoš Friedl	4	2
(Canada) Adil Shamasdin (Austria) Martin Slanar	6	6
WC	(Belgium) Germain Gigounon (Belgium) Christophe Rochus	3	5
WC	(Belgium) Ruben Bemelmans (Belgium) Yannick Mertens	6	7
(Switzerland) Yves Allegro (France) Nicolas Mahut	6^{1}	6	[10]
4	(Jamaica) Dustin Brown (Netherlands) Rogier Wassen	7	4	[5]
WC	(Belgium) Steve Darcis (Belgium) David Goffin	6	1	[10]
(Serbia) Ilija Bozoljac (United States) James Cerretani	4	6	[7]
(United States) Brian Battistone (Sweden) Andreas Siljeström	3	7	[7]
2	(Sweden) Johan Brunström (United States) Scott Lipsky	6	6^{3}	[10]

Quarterfinals
1	(Slovakia) F Polášek (Slovakia) I Zelenay	7	5	[12]
(Germany) F Moser (Czech Republic) D Škoch	6^{5}	7	[10]
(Thailand) Sa Ratiwatana (Thailand) So Ratiwatana	6^{3}	6	[3]
(Canada) A Shamasdin (Austria) M Slanar	7	3	[10]
WC	(Belgium) R Bemelmans (Belgium) Y Mertens	6	6
(Switzerland) Y Allegro (France) N Mahut	3	3
WC	(Belgium) S Darcis (Belgium) D Goffin	6	7
2	(Sweden) J Brunström (United States) S Lipsky	4	5

Semifinals
1	(Slovakia) F Polášek (Slovakia) I Zelenay	6	6
(Canada) A Shamasdin (Austria) M Slanar	4	3
WC	(Belgium) R Bemelmans (Belgium) Y Mertens	7	6
WC	(Belgium) S Darcis (Belgium) D Goffin	6^{5}	4

Finals
1	(Slovakia) F Polášek (Slovakia) I Zelenay	3	6	[10]
WC	(Belgium) R Bemelmans (Belgium) Y Mertens	6	4	[5]
