= 2011 Ethias Trophy – Singles =

Singles
- 2011 Ethias Trophy

Final
- Champion: (Italy) Andreas Seppi
- Runner-up: (France) Julien Benneteau
- Score: 2–6, 6–3, 7–6^{(7–4)}

Events
Singles	Doubles
← 2010 ·	Ethias Trophy	· 2012 →

Adrian Mannarino was the defending champion, but lost in the first round to Michał Przysiężny.
Andreas Seppi won the title, defeating Julien Benneteau 2–6, 6–3, 7–6^{(7–4)} in the final.

== Seeds ==
1. (Belgium) Xavier Malisse (second round)
2. (Italy) Andreas Seppi (champion)
3. (Ukraine) Sergiy Stakhovsky (first round)
4. (France) Adrian Mannarino (first round)
5. (France) Julien Benneteau (final)
6. (Belgium) Olivier Rochus (first round)
7. (France) Nicolas Mahut (quarterfinals)
8. (Belgium) Steve Darcis (quarterfinals)

== Draw ==
=== Key ===
- Q = Qualifier
- WC = Wild card
- LL = Lucky loser
- Alt = Alternate
- SE = Special exempt
- PR = Protected ranking
- ITF = ITF entry
- JE = Junior exempt
- w/o = Walkover
- r = Retired
- d = Defaulted
- SR = Special ranking

=== Finals ===
Semifinals
WC	(Belgium) David Goffin	4	2
5	(France) Julien Benneteau	6	6
(Lithuania) Ričardas Berankis	6^{4}	6^{2}
2	(Italy) Andreas Seppi	7^{7}	7^{7}

Final
5	(France) Julien Benneteau	6	3	6^{4}
2	(Italy) Andreas Seppi	2	6	7^{7}

=== Top half ===
First round
1/WC	(Belgium) X Malisse	6	6
(Slovakia) L Lacko	4	3
(Germany) D Brown	6	2	1
(Colombia) A Falla	3	6	6
Q	(United Kingdom) J Goodall	2	3
WC	(Belgium) Y Mertens	6	6
WC	(Belgium) D Goffin	7	4	7^{7}
6	(Belgium) O Rochus	5	6	6^{4}
3	(Ukraine) S Stakhovsky	6^{2}	3
(Germany) M Bachinger	7^{7}	6
(Belgium) R Bemelmans	0	2
(Germany) T Kamke	6	6
(France) E Roger-Vasselin	3	6	4
(Ukraine) S Bubka	6	2	6
(Kazakhstan) A Golubev	4	3
5	(France) J Benneteau	6	6

Second round
1/WC	(Belgium) X Malisse	1	5
(Colombia) A Falla	6	7
WC	(Belgium) Y Mertens	4	4
WC	(Belgium) D Goffin	6	6
(Germany) M Bachinger	4	4
(Germany) T Kamke	6	6
(Ukraine) S Bubka	4	2
5	(France) J Benneteau	6	6

Quarterfinals
(Colombia) A Falla	0	7^{8}	6^{4}
WC	(Belgium) D Goffin	6	6^{6}	7^{7}
(Germany) T Kamke	2	6	3
5	(France) J Benneteau	6	4	6

Semifinals
WC	(Belgium) D Goffin	4	2
5	(France) J Benneteau	6	6

=== Bottom half ===
First round
7	(France) N Mahut	6	6
(Spain) A Brugués-Davi	2	1
(Russia) K Kravchuk	6^{1}	6^{4}
(Netherlands) I Sijsling	7^{7}	7^{7}
(France) K de Schepper	4	2
(Lithuania) R Berankis	6	6
Q	(Poland) M Przysiężny	6	7^{7}
4	(France) A Mannarino	2	6^{1}
8	(Belgium) S Darcis	6	7^{8}
Q	(Republic of Ireland) C Niland	1	6^{6}
(France) M Teixeira	1	2
WC	(Belgium) M Authom	6	6
Q	(France) J Dasnières de Veigy	5	6^{1}
(Tunisia) M Jaziri	7	7^{7}
(France) Grégoire Burquier	1	0
2	(Italy) A Seppi	6	6

Second round
7	(France) N Mahut	w/o
(Netherlands) I Sijsling
(Lithuania) R Berankis	1	6	6
Q	(Poland) M Przysiężny	6	4	1
8	(Belgium) S Darcis	7^{7}	4	6
WC	(Belgium) M Authom	6^{4}	6	2
(Tunisia) M Jaziri	1	1
2	(Italy) A Seppi	6	6

Quarterfinals
7	(France) N Mahut	1	3
(Lithuania) R Berankis	6	6
8	(Belgium) S Darcis	6	5	0
2	(Italy) A Seppi	3	7	6

Semifinals
(Lithuania) R Berankis	6^{4}	6^{2}
2	(Italy) A Seppi	7^{7}	7^{7}
