= 2016 Ethias Trophy – Singles =

Singles
- 2016 Ethias Trophy

Final
- Champion: (Germany) Jan-Lennard Struff
- Runner-up: (France) Vincent Millot
- Score: 6–2, 6–0

Events
Singles	Doubles
← 2015 ·	Ethias Trophy

Illya Marchenko was the defending champion but lost in the second round to Vincent Millot.

Jan-Lennard Struff won the title after defeating Millot 6–2, 6–0 in the final.

== Seeds ==
1. (Ukraine) Illya Marchenko (second round)
2. (Germany) Dustin Brown (first round)
3. (France) Paul-Henri Mathieu (quarterfinals)
4. (France) Jérémy Chardy (second round)
5. (Lithuania) Ričardas Berankis (quarterfinals)
6. (Germany) Jan-Lennard Struff (champion)
7. (Croatia) Ivan Dodig (first round)
8. (Moldova) Radu Albot (second round)

== Draw ==
=== Key ===
- Q = Qualifier
- WC = Wild card
- LL = Lucky loser
- Alt = Alternate
- SE = Special exempt
- PR = Protected ranking
- ITF = ITF entry
- JE = Junior exempt
- w/o = Walkover
- r = Retired
- d = Defaulted
- SR = Special ranking

=== Finals ===
Semifinals
(France) Vincent Millot	6	6
(Germany) Daniel Brands	4	4
6	(Germany) Jan-Lennard Struff	7^{7}	7^{7}
(Russia) Daniil Medvedev	6^{2}	6^{5}

Final
(France) Vincent Millot	2	0
6	(Germany) Jan-Lennard Struff	6	6

=== Top half ===
First round
1/WC	(Ukraine) I Marchenko	7^{9}	6
(Uzbekistan) D Istomin	6^{7}	3
(France) V Millot	6	6^{6}	6
Q	(France) Maxime Tabatruong	4	7^{8}	3
(Slovakia) L Lacko	4	4
PR	(Poland) J Janowicz	6	6
(Hungary) M Fucsovics	6^{13}	2
5	(Lithuania) R Berankis	7^{15}	6
4	(France) J Chardy	6	6
(Germany) T Kamke	3	4
SE	(Russia) A Rublev	6	7
WC	(Belgium) Y Reuter	4	5
(Germany) D Brands	6	6
(Belgium) K Coppejans	3	2
WC	(Belgium) R Bemelmans	4	5
8	(Moldova) R Albot	6	7

Second round
1/WC	(Ukraine) I Marchenko	6	2	6^{0}
(France) V Millot	2	6	7^{7}
PR	(Poland) J Janowicz	5	6^{4}
5	(Lithuania) R Berankis	7	7^{7}
4	(France) J Chardy	4	6	4
SE	(Russia) A Rublev	6	2	6
(Germany) D Brands	6	6
8	(Moldova) R Albot	4	4

Quarterfinals
(France) V Millot	6	6
5	(Lithuania) R Berankis	4	4
SE	(Russia) A Rublev	6^{9}	3
(Germany) D Brands	7^{11}	6

Semifinals
(France) V Millot	6	6
(Germany) D Brands	4	4

=== Bottom half ===
First round
6	(Germany) J-L Struff	6	3	6
LL	(France) G Barrère	3	6	2
(Belgium) S Darcis	3	4
(Switzerland) M Chiudinelli	6	6
Q	(France) S Doumbia	1	2
Q	(Switzerland) Y Marti	6	6
Q	(Belgium) M Authom	6	3	3
3	(France) P-H Mathieu	1	6	6
7	(Croatia) I Dodig	3	5
SE	(Slovakia) N Gombos	6	7
(Russia) D Medvedev	6	6
WC	(Belgium) Clément Geens	4	1
(Belarus) I Ivashka	6^{5}	6	4
(France) K de Schepper	7^{7}	3	6
PR	(Austria) J Melzer	3	6	7^{7}
2	(Germany) D Brown	6	2	6^{4}

Second round
6	(Germany) J-L Struff	6^{8}	6	6
(Switzerland) M Chiudinelli	7^{10}	4	3
Q	(Switzerland) Y Marti	2	3
3	(France) P-H Mathieu	6	6
SE	(Slovakia) N Gombos	3	6^{8}
(Russia) D Medvedev	6	7^{10}
(France) K de Schepper	2	6^{3}
PR	(Austria) J Melzer	6	7^{7}

Quarterfinals
6	(Germany) J-L Struff	7	6
3	(France) P-H Mathieu	5	4
(Russia) D Medvedev	6	6
PR	(Austria) J Melzer	1	0

Semifinals
6	(Germany) J-L Struff	7^{7}	7^{7}
(Russia) D Medvedev	6^{2}	6^{5}
