= 2014 Ethias Trophy – Doubles =

Doubles
- 2014 Ethias Trophy

Final
- Champions: (France) Marc Gicquel; (France) Nicolas Mahut
- Runners-up: (Germany) Andre Begemann; (Austria) Julian Knowle
- Score: 6–3, 6–4

Events
Singles	Doubles
← 2013 ·	Ethias Trophy	· 2015 →

Jesse Huta Galung and Igor Sijsling were the defending champions, but Sijsling decided not to participate.

Huta Galung partnered with Michael Venus but was eliminated in the semifinals.

Marc Gicquel and Nicolas Mahut won the title by defeating Andre Begemann and Julian Knowle 6–3, 6–4 in the final.

== Seeds ==
1. (Germany) Andre Begemann / (Austria) Julian Knowle (final)
2. (Austria) Oliver Marach / (Austria) Philipp Oswald (quarterfinals)
3. (Netherlands) Jesse Huta Galung / (New Zealand) Michael Venus (semifinals)
4. (Finland) Henri Kontinen / (United Kingdom) Jonathan Marray (semifinals)

== Draw ==
=== Key ===
- Q = Qualifier
- WC = Wild card
- LL = Lucky loser
- Alt = Alternate
- SE = Special exempt
- PR = Protected ranking
- ITF = ITF entry
- JE = Junior exempt
- w/o = Walkover
- r = Retired
- d = Defaulted
- SR = Special ranking

=== Draw ===
First round

Quarterfinals

Semifinals

Final

1
- (Germany) A Begemann
- (Austria) J Knowle
6
6

- (Brazil) T Bellucci
- (Brazil) A Sá
2
3

1
- (Germany) A Begemann
- (Austria) J Knowle
6
6

- (Germany) D Brown
- (Germany) C Kas
6
6

- (Germany) D Brown
- (Germany) C Kas
3
4

- (Czech Republic) F Čermák
- (Sweden) A Siljeström
4
4

1
- (Germany) A Begemann
- (Austria) J Knowle
6
6

4
- (Finland) H Kontinen
- (United Kingdom) J Marray
6
6

4
- (Finland) H Kontinen
- (United Kingdom) J Marray
3
4

- (Germany) M Emmrich
- (Germany) G Kretschmer
3
3

4
- (Finland) H Kontinen
- (United Kingdom) J Marray
6
6^{6}
[10]

WC
- (Belgium) S Darcis
- (Belgium) O Rochus
6
7

WC
- (Belgium) S Darcis
- (Belgium) O Rochus
3
7^{8}
[7]

- (Germany) T Kamke
- (Germany) P Marx
4
5

1
- (Germany) A Begemann
- (Austria) J Knowle
3
4

WC
- (Belgium) J Cagnina
- (Belgium) G Gigounon
7
6
[10]

- (France) M Gicquel
- (France) N Mahut
6
6

WC
- (Belgium) M Authom
- (Belgium) R Bemelmans
5
7
[5]

WC
- (Belgium) J Cagnina
- (Belgium) G Gigounon
5
6
[6]

- (United Kingdom) K Skupski
- (United Kingdom) N Skupski
4
6^{5}

3
- (Netherlands) J Huta Galung
- (New Zealand) M Venus
7
1
[10]

3
- (Netherlands) J Huta Galung
- (New Zealand) M Venus
6
7^{7}

3
- (Netherlands) J Huta Galung
- (New Zealand) M Venus
3
2

- (Australia) R Junaid
- (India) P Raja
1
4

- (France) M Gicquel
- (France) N Mahut
6
6

- (France) M Gicquel
- (France) N Mahut
6
6

- (France) M Gicquel
- (France) N Mahut
7
6

- (Poland) T Bednarek
- (Poland) M Kowalczyk
4
1

2
- (Austria) O Marach
- (Austria) P Oswald
5
3

2
- (Austria) O Marach
- (Austria) P Oswald
6
6
