= 2011 Ethias Trophy =

- Date: 3–9 October
- Edition: 7th
- Location: Mons, Belgium

Champions

Singles
- (Italy) Andreas Seppi

Doubles
- (Sweden) Johan Brunström / (United Kingdom) Ken Skupski
← 2010 ·	Ethias Trophy	· 2012 →

The 2011 Ethias Trophy was a professional tennis tournament played on hard courts. It was the seventh edition of the tournament which was part of the 2011 ATP Challenger Tour and the Tretorn SERIE+. It took place in Mons, Belgium between 3 and 9 October 2011.

== ATP entrants ==
=== Seeds ===
Country	Player	Rank^{1}	Seed
BEL	Xavier Malisse	46	1
ITA	Andreas Seppi	49	2
UKR	Sergiy Stakhovsky	63	3
FRA	Adrian Mannarino	67	4
FRA	Julien Benneteau	72	5
BEL	Olivier Rochus	75	6
FRA	Nicolas Mahut	84	7
BEL	Steve Darcis	86	8

- ^{1} Rankings are as of September 26, 2011.

=== Other entrants ===
The following players received wildcards into the singles main draw:

- (Belgium) Maxime Authom
- (Belgium) David Goffin
- (Belgium) Xavier Malisse
- (Belgium) Yannick Mertens

The following players received entry from the qualifying draw:

- (France) Jonathan Dasnières de Veigy
- (United Kingdom) Josh Goodall
- (Republic of Ireland) Conor Niland
- (Poland) Michał Przysiężny

== Champions ==
=== Singles ===
(Italy) Andreas Seppi def. (France) Julien Benneteau, 2–6, 6–3, 7–6^{(7–4)}

=== Doubles ===
(Sweden) Johan Brunström / (United Kingdom) Ken Skupski def. (France) Kenny de Schepper / (France) Édouard Roger-Vasselin, 7–6^{(7–4)}, 6–3
