= 2016 Ethias Trophy – Doubles =

Doubles
- 2016 Ethias Trophy

Final
- Champions: (Austria) Julian Knowle (Austria) Jürgen Melzer
- Runners-up: (Netherlands) Sander Arends (Netherlands) Wesley Koolhof
- Score: 7–6^{(7–4)}, 7–6^{(7–4)}

Events
Singles	Doubles
← 2015 ·	Ethias Trophy

Ruben Bemelmans and Philipp Petzschner were the defending champions but chose not to defend their title.

Julian Knowle and Jürgen Melzer won the title after defeating Sander Arends and Wesley Koolhof 7–6^{(7–4)}, 7–6^{(7–4)} in the final.

== Seeds ==
1. (New Zealand) Marcus Daniell / (Brazil) Marcelo Demoliner (first round)
2. (United Kingdom) Ken Skupski / (United Kingdom) Neal Skupski (quarterfinals)
3. (Canada) Adil Shamasdin / (Sweden) Andreas Siljeström (first round)
4. (Netherlands) Sander Arends / (Netherlands) Wesley Koolhof (final)

== Draw ==
=== Key ===
- Q = Qualifier
- WC = Wild card
- LL = Lucky loser
- Alt = Alternate
- SE = Special exempt
- PR = Protected ranking
- ITF = ITF entry
- JE = Junior exempt
- w/o = Walkover
- r = Retired
- d = Defaulted
- SR = Special ranking

First round
1	(New Zealand) M Daniell (Brazil) M Demoliner	5	6	[7]
(Croatia) N Mektić (Croatia) F Škugor	7	1	[10]
(Belarus) A Bury (Austria) T-S Weissborn	2	6	[7]
(Kazakhstan) A Golubev (Netherlands) M Middelkoop	6	4	[10]
4	(Netherlands) S Arends (Netherlands) W Koolhof	7^{7}	6
(Moldova) R Albot (Belarus) E Gerasimov	6^{3}	2
(Germany) G Kretschmer (Slovakia) I Zelenay	5	3
(Belgium) K Coppejans (Belgium) S Darcis	7	6
(Germany) D Brown (Germany) J-L Struff	6	6
WC	(Belgium) S Gillé (Belgium) J Vliegen	4	4
WC	(Belgium) M Authom (Belgium) Y Mertens	6	6
3	(Canada) A Shamasdin (Sweden) A Siljeström	0	4
PR	(Austria) J Knowle (Austria) J Melzer	6	3	[10]
(Belarus) S Betov (Belarus) I Ivashka	4	6	[6]
WC	(Belgium) Clément Geens (Belgium) Y Reuter	0	2
2	(United Kingdom) K Skupski (United Kingdom) N Skupski	6	6

Quarterfinals
(Croatia) N Mektić (Croatia) F Škugor	6	6
(Kazakhstan) A Golubev (Netherlands) M Middelkoop	1	2
4	(Netherlands) S Arends (Netherlands) W Koolhof	6	3	[12]
(Belgium) K Coppejans (Belgium) S Darcis	3	6	[10]
(Germany) D Brown (Germany) J-L Struff	6^{9}	6	[10]
WC	(Belgium) M Authom (Belgium) Y Mertens	7^{11}	4	[8]
PR	(Austria) J Knowle (Austria) J Melzer	6	4	[12]
2	(United Kingdom) K Skupski (United Kingdom) N Skupski	3	6	[10]

Semifinals
(Croatia) N Mektić (Croatia) F Škugor	6^{5}	4
4	(Netherlands) S Arends (Netherlands) W Koolhof	7^{7}	6
(Germany) D Brown (Germany) J-L Struff	7^{7}	1	[5]
PR	(Austria) J Knowle (Austria) J Melzer	6^{3}	6	[10]

Final
4	(Netherlands) S Arends (Netherlands) W Koolhof	6^{4}	6^{4}
PR	(Austria) J Knowle (Austria) J Melzer	7^{7}	7^{7}
