= 2009 Ethias Trophy – Singles =

Singles
- 2009 Ethias Trophy

Final
- Champion: (Serbia) Janko Tipsarević
- Runner-up: (Ukraine) Sergiy Stakhovsky
- Score: 7–6(4), 6–3

Events
Singles	Doubles
← 2008 ·	Ethias Trophy	· 2010 →

Teymuraz Gabashvili tried to defend his 2008 title but he was eliminated by Xavier Malisse in the second round.
Number 1 seed Janko Tipsarević won this tournament, defeating unseeded Sergiy Stakhovsky in the final, 7–6(4), 6–3.

== Seeds ==
1. (Serbia) Janko Tipsarević (champion)
2. (Italy) Simone Bolelli (first round)
3. (Russia) Evgeny Korolev (quarterfinals)
4. (France) Marc Gicquel (first round)
5. (Russia) Teymuraz Gabashvili (second round)
6. (Belgium) Olivier Rochus (first round)
7. (France) Florent Serra (second round)
8. (Belgium) Christophe Rochus (first round)

== Draw ==
=== Key ===
- Q = Qualifier
- WC = Wild card
- LL = Lucky loser
- Alt = Alternate
- SE = Special exempt
- PR = Protected ranking
- ITF = ITF entry
- JE = Junior exempt
- w/o = Walkover
- r = Retired
- d = Defaulted
- SR = Special ranking

=== Final eight ===
Semifinals
1	(Serbia) Janko Tipsarević	6	6
(Belgium) Steve Darcis	4	3
(Ukraine) Sergiy Stakhovsky	6	2	6
Q	(Ukraine) Illya Marchenko	2	6	2

Final
1	(Serbia) Janko Tipsarević	7	6
(Ukraine) Sergiy Stakhovsky	6^{4}	3

=== Top half ===
First round
1	(Serbia) Janko Tipsarević	6	6
Q	(Ukraine) Sergei Bubka	4	4
(Colombia) Alejandro Falla	3
(Germany) Nicolas Kiefer	2	r
(Germany) Michael Berrer	6^{4}	6	4
(Belgium) Xavier Malisse	7	4	6
WC	(Belgium) Ruben Bemelmans	7	3	3
5	(Russia) Teymuraz Gabashvili	6^{4}	6	6
4	(France) Marc Gicquel	6	3	4
(Uzbekistan) Denis Istomin	2	6	6
WC	(Belgium) Yannick Vandenbulcke	4	4
(Belgium) Steve Darcis	6	6
(Brazil) Thiago Alves	6	6
WC	(Belgium) Arthur de Greef	1	4
(France) Josselin Ouanna	6	4	6
6	(Belgium) Olivier Rochus	3	6	4

Second round
1	(Serbia) J Tipsarević	6	6
(Colombia) A Falla	2	1
(Belgium) X Malisse	6	6
5	(Russia) T Gabashvili	4	2
(Uzbekistan) D Istomin	4	2
(Belgium) S Darcis	6	6
(Brazil) T Alves	4	3
(France) J Ouanna	6	6

Quarterfinals
1	(Serbia) J Tipsarević	7	6
(Belgium) X Malisse	5	4
(Belgium) S Darcis	7	7
(France) J Ouanna	6^{5}	6^{4}

Semifinals
1	(Serbia) J Tipsarević	6	6
(Belgium) S Darcis	4	3

=== Bottom half ===
First round
7	(France) Florent Serra	6	6
(France) Arnaud Clément	3	0
(Ukraine) Sergiy Stakhovsky	6	6^{1}	6
Q	(Slovakia) Dominik Hrbatý	3	7	4
Q	(France) Jérôme Haehnel	4	1
(Switzerland) Stéphane Bohli	6	2	r
(Germany) Björn Phau	3	2
3	(Russia) Evgeny Korolev	6	6
8	(Belgium) Christophe Rochus	6^{1}	6	3
WC	(Belgium) David Goffin	7	4	6
(Austria) Stefan Koubek	6^{1}	6^{5}
(Slovakia) Lukáš Lacko	7	7
(Australia) Carsten Ball	2	3
Q	(Ukraine) Illya Marchenko	6	6
(Slovakia) Karol Beck	5	6	6
2	(Italy) Simone Bolelli	7	1	4

Second round
7	(France) F Serra	6^{7}	4
(Ukraine) S Stakhovsky	7	6
Q	(France) J Haehnel	6^{5}	3
3	(Russia) E Korolev	7	6
WC	(Belgium) D Goffin	1	2
(Slovakia) L Lacko	6	6
Q	(Ukraine) I Marchenko	0	6	6
(Slovakia) K Beck	6	3	1

Quarterfinals
(Ukraine) S Stakhovsky	6	6
3	(Russia) E Korolev	3	4
(Slovakia) L Lacko	1	7	2
Q	(Ukraine) I Marchenko	6	6^{3}	6

Semifinals
(Ukraine) S Stakhovsky	6	2	6
Q	(Ukraine) I Marchenko	2	6	2
