= 2012 Ethias Trophy – Doubles =

Doubles
- 2012 Ethias Trophy

Final
- Champions: (Poland) Tomasz Bednarek (Poland) Jerzy Janowicz
- Runners-up: (France) Michaël Llodra (France) Édouard Roger-Vasselin
- Score: 7–5, 4–6, [10–2]

Events
Singles	Doubles
← 2011 ·	Ethias Trophy	· 2013 →

Johan Brunström and Ken Skupski were the defending champions but decided not to participate together.
Brunström played alongside Raven Klaasen, while Skupski partnered up with Jamie Delgado.
Tomasz Bednarek and Jerzy Janowicz won the final 7–5, 4–6, [10–2] against Michaël Llodra and Édouard Roger-Vasselin.

== Seeds ==
1. (France) Michaël Llodra / (France) Édouard Roger-Vasselin (final)
2. (Australia) Paul Hanley / (Germany) Christopher Kas (first round)
3. (United Kingdom) Jamie Delgado / (United Kingdom) Ken Skupski (first round)
4. (Sweden) Johan Brunström / (South Africa) Raven Klaasen (first round)

== Draw ==
=== Key ===
- Q = Qualifier
- WC = Wild card
- LL = Lucky loser
- Alt = Alternate
- SE = Special exempt
- PR = Protected ranking
- ITF = ITF entry
- JE = Junior exempt
- w/o = Walkover
- r = Retired
- d = Defaulted
- SR = Special ranking

=== Draw ===
First round
1	(France) M Llodra (France) É Roger-Vasselin	6	6
(Germany) A Begemann (Germany) M Emmerich	4	3
(United States) J Cerretani (Romania) F Mergea	4	4
(Belgium) D Goffin (Belgium) O Rochus	6	6
4	(Sweden) J Brunström (South Africa) R Klaasen	6	3	[3]
(Germany) M Kohlmann (Belgium) D Norman	4	6	[10]
WC	(Belgium) S Darcis (Belgium) G Gigounon	4	4
WC	(Belgium) R Bemelmans (Belgium) X Malisse	6	6
(Germany) D Brown (Canada) A Shamasdin	6	3	[10]
(Germany) T Kamke (Germany) P Marx	1	6	[4]
(Czech Republic) L Dlouhý (Slovakia) M Mertiňák	7	1	[10]
3	(United Kingdom) J Delgado (United Kingdom) K Skupski	1	6	[5]
(Poland) T Bednarek (Poland) J Janowicz	7	6
WC	(Belgium) M Authom (Belgium) Y Mertens	5	2
(United Kingdom) D Inglot (Czech Republic) L Rosol	6	4	[10]
2	(Australia) P Hanley (Germany) C Kas	4	6	[6]

Quarterfinals
1	(France) M Llodra (France) É Roger-Vasselin	6	7
(Belgium) D Goffin (Belgium) O Rochus	4	5
(Germany) M Kohlmann (Belgium) D Norman	7	6
WC	(Belgium) R Bemelmans (Belgium) X Malisse	5	1
(Germany) D Brown (Canada) A Shamasdin	3	2
(Czech Republic) L Dlouhý (Slovakia) M Mertiňák	6	6
(Poland) T Bednarek (Poland) J Janowicz	6	6
(United Kingdom) D Inglot (Czech Republic) L Rosol	4	1

Semifinals
1	(France) M Llodra (France) É Roger-Vasselin	6	6
(Germany) M Kohlmann (Belgium) D Norman	4	3
(Czech Republic) L Dlouhý (Slovakia) M Mertiňák	4	6	[5]
(Poland) T Bednarek (Poland) J Janowicz	6	4	[10]

Final
1	(France) M Llodra (France) É Roger-Vasselin	5	6	[2]
(Poland) T Bednarek (Poland) J Janowicz	7	4	[10]
