= 2011 Ethias Trophy – Doubles =

Doubles
- 2011 Ethias Trophy

Final
- Champions: (Sweden) Johan Brunström (United Kingdom) Ken Skupski
- Runners-up: (France) Kenny de Schepper (France) Édouard Roger-Vasselin
- Score: 7–6^{(7–4)}, 6–3

Events
Singles	Doubles
← 2010 ·	Ethias Trophy	· 2012 →

Filip Polášek and Igor Zelenay were the defending champions but Polášek decided not to participate.
Zelenay partnered with Dustin Brown, losing in the first round.
Johan Brunström and Ken Skupski won the title, defeating Kenny de Schepper and Édouard Roger-Vasselin 7–6^{(7–4)}, 6–3 in the final.

== Seeds ==
1. (United States) James Cerretani / (Germany) Philipp Marx (first round)
2. (Austria) Julian Knowle / (Brazil) André Sá (first round)
3. (Germany) Dustin Brown / (Slovakia) Igor Zelenay (first round)
4. (United Kingdom) Jamie Delgado / (United Kingdom) Jonathan Marray (first round)

== Draw ==
=== Key ===
- Q = Qualifier
- WC = Wild card
- LL = Lucky loser
- Alt = Alternate
- SE = Special exempt
- PR = Protected ranking
- ITF = ITF entry
- JE = Junior exempt
- w/o = Walkover
- r = Retired
- d = Defaulted
- SR = Special ranking

=== Draw ===
First round
1	(United States) J Cerretani (Germany) P Marx	3	5
(Lithuania) R Berankis (Colombia) A Falla	6	7
WC	(Belgium) Maxime Braeckman (Belgium) X Malisse	3	2
(Ukraine) S Bubka (Ukraine) S Stakhovsky	6	6
3	(Germany) D Brown (Slovakia) I Zelenay	2	2
(France) K de Schepper (France) É Roger-Vasselin	6	6
(Australia) C Ebelthite (Australia) A Feeney	6^{5}	6^{4}
WC	(Belgium) S Darcis (Belgium) D Goffin	7^{7}	7^{7}
(Canada) A Shamasdin (Croatia) L Zovko	6	6^{5}	[8]
WC	(Belgium) R Bemelmans (Belgium) Y Mertens	4	7^{7}	[10]
(Germany) M Bachinger (Germany) F Moser	6	6
4	(United Kingdom) J Delgado (United Kingdom) J Marray	4	4
(Sweden) J Brunström (United Kingdom) K Skupski	3	7	[10]
(France) J Benneteau (France) N Mahut	6	5	[7]
(Germany) M Emmrich (Sweden) A Siljeström	6	6
2	(Austria) J Knowle (Brazil) A Sá	2	3

Quarterfinals
(Lithuania) R Berankis (Colombia) A Falla	w/o
(Ukraine) S Bubka (Ukraine) S Stakhovsky
(France) K de Schepper (France) É Roger-Vasselin	w/o
WC	(Belgium) S Darcis (Belgium) D Goffin
WC	(Belgium) R Bemelmans (Belgium) Y Mertens	7^{7}	7^{8}
(Germany) M Bachinger (Germany) F Moser	6^{4}	6^{6}
(Sweden) J Brunström (United Kingdom) K Skupski	6	6
(Germany) M Emmrich (Sweden) A Siljeström	3	3

Semifinals
(Lithuania) R Berankis (Colombia) A Falla	6	5	[6]
(France) K de Schepper (France) É Roger-Vasselin	4	7	[10]
WC	(Belgium) R Bemelmans (Belgium) Y Mertens	4	3
(Sweden) J Brunström (United Kingdom) K Skupski	6	6

Final
(France) K de Schepper (France) É Roger-Vasselin	6^{4}	3
(Sweden) J Brunström (United Kingdom) K Skupski	7^{7}	6
