= 2014 Ethias Trophy =

- Date: 29 September – 5 October
- Edition: 10th
- Surface: Hard
- Location: Mons, Belgium

Champions

Singles
- (Belgium) David Goffin

Doubles
- (France) Marc Gicquel / (France) Nicolas Mahut
← 2013 ·	Ethias Trophy	· 2015 →

The 2014 Ethias Trophy was a professional tennis tournament played on hard courts. It was the tenth edition of the tournament which was part of the 2014 ATP Challenger Tour. It took place in Mons, Belgium between 29 September and 5 October 2014.

== Singles main-draw entrants ==
=== Seeds ===
Country	Player	Rank^{1}	Seed
BEL	David Goffin	32	1
NED	Igor Sijsling	72	2
CZE	Jiří Veselý	77	3
BRA	Thomaz Bellucci	79	4
ISR	Dudi Sela	83	5
FRA	Paul-Henri Mathieu	84	6
AUT	Andreas Haider-Maurer	92	7
GER	Dustin Brown	94	8

- ^{1} Rankings are as of September 22, 2014.

=== Other entrants ===
The following players received wildcards into the singles main draw:

- (Belgium) Julien Cagnina
- (Belgium) Kimmer Coppejans
- (Belgium) David Goffin
- (Belgium) Olivier Rochus

The following players received entry as an alternate into the singles main draw:

- (Czech Republic) Jaroslav Pospíšil

The following players used protected ranking to gain entry into the singles main draw:

- (Belgium) Steve Darcis

The following players received entry from the qualifying draw:

- (Italy) Andrea Arnaboldi
- (Germany) Matthias Bachinger
- (Switzerland) Yann Marti
- (France) Maxime Teixeira

== Champions ==
=== Singles ===
- (Belgium) David Goffin def. (Belgium) Steve Darcis, 6–3, 6–3

=== Doubles ===
- (France) Marc Gicquel / (France) Nicolas Mahut def. (Germany) Andre Begemann / (Austria) Julian Knowle, 6–3, 6–4
