= 2009 Ethias Trophy – Doubles =

Doubles
- 2009 Ethias Trophy

Final
- Champions: (Uzbekistan) Denis Istomin (Russia) Evgeny Korolev
- Runners-up: (Colombia) Alejandro Falla (Russia) Teymuraz Gabashvili
- Score: 6–7(4), 7–6(4), [11–9]

Events
Singles	Doubles
- Ethias Trophy

Michal Mertiňák and Lovro Zovko were the defending champions, but they chose to not compete this year.
Denis Istomin and Evgeny Korolev won the final 6–7(4), 7–6(4), [11–9], against Alejandro Falla and Teymuraz Gabashvili.

== Seeds ==
1. (United Kingdom) Colin Fleming / (United Kingdom) Ken Skupski (quarterfinals)
2. (Czech Republic) Leoš Friedl / (Czech Republic) David Škoch (quarterfinals)
3. (Australia) Carsten Ball / (Germany) Frank Moser (semifinals)
4. (Germany) Philipp Marx / (Slovakia) Igor Zelenay (semifinals)

== Draw ==
Key

- Q = Qualifier
- WC = Wild card
- LL = Lucky loser
- Alt = Alternate
- ITF = ITF entry
- PR = Protected ranking
- SR = Special ranking
- SE = Special exempt
- JE = Junior exempt
- JR = Junior Accelerator Programme entrant
- CO = College Accelerator Programme entrant
- NG = Next Gen Accelerator Program entrant
- w/o = Walkover
- r = Retired
- d = Defaulted

=== Draw ===
First round
1	(United Kingdom) Colin Fleming (United Kingdom) Ken Skupski	6	7
(France) Thierry Ascione (France) Arnaud Clément	2	5
(Colombia) Alejandro Falla (Russia) Teymuraz Gabashvili	7	6
(Slovakia) Dominik Hrbatý (Germany) Michael Kohlmann	5	4
3	(Australia) Carsten Ball (Germany) Frank Moser	7	6
WC	(Belgium) David Goffin (Belgium) Christophe Rochus	6^{5}	4
(United Kingdom) Jonathan Marray (Pakistan) Aisam-ul-Haq Qureshi	5	6	[10]
WC	(Belgium) Ruben Bemelmans (Belgium) Yannick Mertens	7	1	[8]
(United States) James Cerretani (Australia) Rameez Junaid	4	6	[6]
WC	(Belgium) Steve Darcis (Belgium) Xavier Malisse	6	3	[10]
(United Kingdom) Jamie Delgado (United Kingdom) Jamie Murray	0	4
4	(Germany) Philipp Marx (Slovakia) Igor Zelenay	6	6
(Uzbekistan) Denis Istomin (Russia) Evgeny Korolev	6	5	[10]
(France) Marc Gicquel (France) Nicolas Mahut	3	7	[8]
(Slovakia) Karol Beck (Ukraine) Sergiy Stakhovsky	4	2
2	(Czech Republic) Leoš Friedl (Czech Republic) David Škoch	6	6

Quarterfinals
1	(United Kingdom) C Fleming (United Kingdom) K Skupski	5	6	[10]
(Colombia) A Falla (Russia) T Gabashvili	7	3	[12]
3	(Australia) C Ball (Germany) F Moser	4	7	[10]
(United Kingdom) J Marray (Pakistan) A-u-H Qureshi	6	6^{5}	[7]
WC	(Belgium) S Darcis (Belgium) X Malisse	3	4
4	(Germany) P Marx (Slovakia) I Zelenay	6	6
(Uzbekistan) D Istomin (Russia) E Korolev	7	6
2	(Czech Republic) L Friedl (Czech Republic) D Škoch	5	1

Semifinals
(Colombia) A Falla (Russia) T Gabashvili	6	6^{4}	[10]
3	(Australia) C Ball (Germany) F Moser	4	7	[8]
4	(Germany) P Marx (Slovakia) I Zelenay	6	2	[10]
(Uzbekistan) D Istomin (Russia) E Korolev	3	6	[12]

Finals
(Colombia) A Falla (Russia) T Gabashvili	7	6^{4}	[9]
(Uzbekistan) D Istomin (Russia) E Korolev	6^{4}	7	[11]
