= 2012 Ethias Trophy =

- Date: 1–7 October
- Edition: 8th
- Surface: Hard
- Location: Mons, Belgium

Champions

Singles
- (France) Kenny de Schepper

Doubles
- (Poland) Tomasz Bednarek / (Poland) Jerzy Janowicz
← 2011 ·	Ethias Trophy	· 2013 →

The 2012 Ethias Trophy was a professional tennis tournament played on hard courts. It was the eighth edition of the tournament which was part of the 2012 ATP Challenger Tour. It took place in Mons, Belgium between 1 and 7 October 2012.

== Singles main-draw entrants ==
=== Seeds ===
Country	Player	Rank^{1}	Seed
BEL	David Goffin	55	1
BEL	Xavier Malisse	59	2
FRA	Nicolas Mahut	68	3
GER	Tobias Kamke	69	4
USA	Jesse Levine	71	5
ITA	Simone Bolelli	75	6
BEL	Steve Darcis	77	7
POL	Jerzy Janowicz	79	8

- ^{1} Rankings are as of September 24, 2012.

=== Other entrants ===
The following players received wildcards into the singles main draw:

- (Belgium) Maxime Authom
- (Belgium) Arthur De Greef
- (Belgium) Yannick Mertens
- (Belgium) Yannik Reuter

The following players received entry as a special exempt into the singles main draw:

- (Ukraine) Oleksandr Nedovyesov
- (Germany) Jan-Lennard Struff

The following players received entry from the qualifying draw:

- (France) Kenny de Schepper
- (Kazakhstan) Evgeny Korolev
- (France) Adrian Mannarino
- (Ukraine) Illya Marchenko

== Champions ==
=== Singles ===
- (France) Kenny de Schepper def. (France) Michaël Llodra, 7–6^{(9–7)}, 4–6, 7–6^{(7–4)}

=== Doubles ===
- (Poland) Tomasz Bednarek / (Poland) Jerzy Janowicz def. (France) Michaël Llodra / (France) Édouard Roger-Vasselin, 7–5, 4–6, [10–2]
