= 2013 Ethias Trophy =

- Date: 30 September – 6 October
- Edition: 9th
- Surface: Hard
- Location: Mons, Belgium

Champions

Singles
- (Czech Republic) Radek Štěpánek

Doubles
- (Netherlands) Jesse Huta Galung / (Netherlands) Igor Sijsling
← 2012 ·	Ethias Trophy	· 2014 →

The 2013 Ethias Trophy was a professional tennis tournament played on hard courts. It was the ninth edition of the tournament which was part of the 2013 ATP Challenger Tour. It took place in Mons, Belgium between 30 September and 6 October 2013.

== Singles main-draw entrants ==
=== Seeds ===
Country	Player	Rank^{1}	Seed
CZE	Radek Štěpánek	51	1
FRA	Kenny de Schepper	67	2
NED	Igor Sijsling	75	3
GER	Tobias Kamke	78	4
UKR	Sergiy Stakhovsky	93	5
ARG	Leonardo Mayer	94	6
NED	Jesse Huta Galung	96	7
KAZ	Mikhail Kukushkin	100	8

- ^{1} Rankings are as of September 23, 2013.

=== Other entrants ===
The following players received wildcards into the singles main draw:

- (Belgium) Ruben Bemelmans
- (Belgium) Steve Darcis
- (Belgium) Germain Gigounon
- (Belgium) Olivier Rochus

The following players received entry as a special exempt into the singles main draw:

- (France) Pierre-Hugues Herbert
- (Czech Republic) Jaroslav Pospíšil

The following players received entry as an alternate into the singles main draw:

- (Ukraine) Illya Marchenko

The following players used protected ranking to gain entry into the singles main draw:

- (Germany) Andreas Beck

The following players received entry from the qualifying draw:

- (Germany) Matthias Bachinger
- (Belgium) Maxime Authom
- (Italy) Lorenzo Giustino
- (Slovakia) Norbert Gombos

== Champions ==
=== Singles ===
- (Czech Republic) Radek Štěpánek def. (Netherlands) Igor Sijsling 6–3, 7–5

=== Doubles ===
- (Netherlands) Jesse Huta Galung / (Netherlands) Igor Sijsling def. (United States) Eric Butorac / (South Africa) Raven Klaasen 4–6, 7–6^{(7–2)}, [10–7]
