= 2010 Ethias Trophy – Singles =

Singles
- 2010 Ethias Trophy

Final
- Champion: (France) Adrian Mannarino
- Runner-up: (Belgium) Steve Darcis
- Score: 7–5, 6–2

Events
Singles	Doubles
← 2009 ·	Ethias Trophy	· 2011 →

Janko Tipsarević, the last year's champion, did not defend his title.
Adrian Mannarino defeated Steve Darcis 7–5, 6–2 in this year's final.

== Seeds ==
1. (Belgium) ~~Xavier Malisse~~ (withdrew)
2. (France) Arnaud Clément (first round)
3. (Belgium) Olivier Rochus (second round)
4. (Germany) Daniel Brands (first round)
5. (France) Stéphane Robert (first round)
6. (Germany) Björn Phau (second round)
7. (Germany) Andreas Beck (second round, withdrew)
8. (Jamaica) Dustin Brown (semifinals)

== Draw ==
=== Key ===
- Q = Qualifier
- WC = Wild card
- LL = Lucky loser
- Alt = Alternate
- SE = Special exempt
- PR = Protected ranking
- ITF = ITF entry
- JE = Junior exempt
- w/o = Walkover
- r = Retired
- d = Defaulted
- SR = Special ranking

=== Finals ===
Semifinals
LL	(France) Marc Gicquel	6^{3}	6^{3}
(Belgium) Steve Darcis	7	7
8	(Jamaica) Dustin Brown	5	4
(France) Adrian Mannarino	7	6

Final
(Belgium) Steve Darcis	5	2
(France) Adrian Mannarino	7	6

=== Top half ===
First round
LL	(France) Marc Gicquel	7	6
(Austria) Stefan Koubek	6^{3}	3
WC	(Belgium) David Goffin	5	5
WC	(Belgium) Ruben Bemelmans	7	7
WC	(Belgium) Kristof Vliegen	6	7
(Netherlands) Thomas Schoorel	3	6^{4}
Q	(Austria) Martin Slanar	3	2
7	(Germany) Andreas Beck	6	6
4	(Germany) Daniel Brands	6	3	3
(Czech Republic) Lukáš Rosol	3	6	6
(Germany) Denis Gremelmayr	6	3	6
(France) David Guez	2	6	0
(Belgium) Steve Darcis	6	2	7
WC	(Belgium) Christophe Rochus	4	6	6^{0}
Q	(Belgium) Yannick Mertens	4	3
6	(Germany) Björn Phau	6	6

Second round
LL	(France) M Gicquel	6	3	6
WC	(Belgium) R Bemelmans	3	6	2
WC	(Belgium) K Vliegen
7	(Germany) A Beck	w/o
(Czech Republic) L Rosol	6^{4}	6^{1}
(Germany) D Gremelmayr	7	7
(Belgium) S Darcis	6	6
6	(Germany) B Phau	2	3

Quarterfinals
LL	(France) M Gicquel	7	6
WC	(Belgium) K Vliegen	6^{5}	4
(Germany) D Gremelmayr	4	7	3
(Belgium) S Darcis	6	6^{6}	6

Semifinals
LL	(France) M Gicquel	6^{3}	6^{3}
(Belgium) S Darcis	7	7

=== Bottom half ===
First round
8	(Jamaica) Dustin Brown	6	7
(Spain) Roberto Bautista-Agut	2	5
Q	(United States) Brian Battistone	3	4
(Switzerland) Stéphane Bohli	6	6
(Netherlands) Igor Sijsling	7	6
(Republic of Ireland) Conor Niland	6^{5}	3
(Serbia) Ilija Bozoljac	5	4
3	(Belgium) Olivier Rochus	7	6
5	(France) Stéphane Robert	2	6^{0}
(Netherlands) Jesse Huta Galung	6	7
(France) Josselin Ouanna	6^{2}	6	3
(Slovakia) Karol Beck	7	3	6
(France) Adrian Mannarino	6	6
Q	(Switzerland) Adrien Bossel	4	4
PR	(Canada) Frank Dancevic	7	6
2	(France) Arnaud Clément	6^{6}	3

Second round
8	(Jamaica) D Brown	6	7
(Switzerland) S Bohli	4	5
(Netherlands) I Sijsling	6	6
3	(Belgium) O Rochus	3	3
(Netherlands) J Huta Galung	6	6
(Slovakia) K Beck	4	4
(France) A Mannarino	6	6
PR	(Canada) F Dancevic	4	4

Quarterfinals
8	(Jamaica) D Brown	6	6
(Netherlands) I Sijsling	4	4
(Netherlands) J Huta Galung	3	6^{6}
(France) A Mannarino	6	7

Semifinals
8	(Jamaica) D Brown	5	4
(France) A Mannarino	7	6
