= 2009 UniCredit Czech Open =

Tennis tournament

- Date: June 1–June 6
- Edition: 16th
- Venue: TK Agrofert Prostějov

Champions

Singles
- (Czech Republic) Jan Hájek

Doubles
- (Sweden) Johan Brunström / (Netherlands Antilles) Jean-Julien Rojer
- UniCredit Czech Open

The 2009 UniCredit Czech Open was a tennis clay-court tournament included in the 2009 ATP Challenger Tour. Agustín Calleri was the defending singles champion, but could not get past the first round. Jan Hájek, world no. 288, came from the qualifying round and took the title in front of his home crowd by beating the top-100 player Steve Darcis in the final. Johan Brunström and Jean-Julien Rojer won the doubles event.

== Singles entrants ==
=== Seeds ===
Nationality	Player	Ranking*	Seeding
RUS	Mikhail Youzhny	30	1
ROU	Victor Hănescu	31	2
SRB	Viktor Troicki	32	3
FRA	Jérémy Chardy	36	4
RUS	Igor Andreev	41	5
RUS	Evgeny Korolev	51	6
URU	Pablo Cuevas	52	7
ARG	Horacio Zeballos	54	8

- Rankings are as of May 25, 2009.

=== Other entrants ===
The following players received wildcards into the singles main draw:

- (Russia) Michail Elgin
- (Russia) Andrey Kuznetsov
- (Russia) Stanislav Vovk

The following players received entry a special Exempt into the singles main draw:

- (Kazakhstan) Mikhail Kukushkin
- (Ukraine) Illya Marchenko

The following players received entry from the qualifying draw:

- (Ukraine) Oleksandr Dolgopolov Jr.
- (Romania) Petru-Alexandru Luncanu
- (Kazakhstan) Yuri Schukin
- (Ukraine) Sergiy Stakhovsky

== Champions ==
=== Singles ===
(Czech Republic) Jan Hájek def. (Belgium) Steve Darcis, 6–2, 1–6, 6–4

=== Doubles ===
(Sweden) Johan Brunström / (Netherlands Antilles) Jean-Julien Rojer def. (Uruguay) Pablo Cuevas / (Slovakia) Dominik Hrbatý, 6–2, 6–3
