= 2015 Ethias Trophy – Doubles =

Doubles
- 2015 Ethias Trophy
- 2014 Champions: (France) Marc Gicquel (France) Nicolas Mahut

Events
Singles	Doubles
← 2014 ·	Ethias Trophy	· 2016 →

Marc Gicquel and Nicolas Mahut are the defending champions, but decided not to defend their title.

== Seeds ==
1. (New Zealand) Marcus Daniell / (Brazil) Marcelo Demoliner (quarterfinals)
2. (Belarus) Sergey Betov / (Russia) Mikhail Elgin (first round)
3. (Netherlands) Wesley Koolhof / (Netherlands) Matwé Middelkoop (first round)
4. (Germany) Gero Kretschmer / (Germany) Alexander Satschko (quarterfinals)

== Draw ==
=== Key ===
- Q = Qualifier
- WC = Wild card
- LL = Lucky loser
- Alt = Alternate
- SE = Special exempt
- PR = Protected ranking
- ITF = ITF entry
- JE = Junior exempt
- w/o = Walkover
- r = Retired
- d = Defaulted
- SR = Special ranking

First round
1	(New Zealand) M Daniell (Brazil) M Demoliner	7	6
WC	(Belgium) Clement Geens (Belgium) Omar Salman	5	4
(Czech Republic) F Čermák (Sweden) A Siljeström	7	4	[10]
(Slovakia) N Gombos (Ukraine) I Marchenko	5	6	[5]
3	(Netherlands) W Koolhof (Netherlands) M Middelkoop	7^{7}	3	[2]
(Spain) M Granollers (Russia) K Khachanov	6^{5}	6	[10]
(Belgium) R Bemelmans (Germany) P Petzschner	3	6	[10]
(France) F Martin (Australia) J-P Smith	6	3	[7]
(Australia) R Junaid (Slovakia) I Zelenay	7^{10}	7^{7}
WC	(Belgium) M Authom (Belgium) N Desein	6^{8}	6^{3}
Alt	(Italy) A Arnaboldi (Italy) L Vanni	1	3
4	(Germany) G Kretschmer (Germany) A Satschko	6	6
WC	(Belgium) G Gigounon (Belgium) Y Mertens	6	6^{6}	[10]
(Kazakhstan) A Golubev (Sweden) E Ymer	2	7^{8}	[12]
(United Kingdom) K Skupski (United Kingdom) N Skupski	7^{7}	6
2	(Belarus) S Betov (Russia) M Elgin	6^{4}	4

Quarterfinals
1	(New Zealand) M Daniell (Brazil) M Demoliner	6	3	[11]
(Czech Republic) F Čermák (Sweden) A Siljeström	4	6	[13]
(Spain) M Granollers (Russia) K Khachanov
(Belgium) R Bemelmans (Germany) P Petzschner	w/o
(Australia) R Junaid (Slovakia) I Zelenay	1	7^{7}	[10]
4	(Germany) G Kretschmer (Germany) A Satschko	6	6^{3}	[3]
(Kazakhstan) A Golubev (Sweden) E Ymer	6	4	[7]
(United Kingdom) K Skupski (United Kingdom) N Skupski	4	6	[10]

Semifinals
(Czech Republic) F Čermák (Sweden) A Siljeström	4	6^{4}
(Belgium) R Bemelmans (Germany) P Petzschner	6	7^{7}
(Australia) R Junaid (Slovakia) I Zelenay	6^{9}	7^{7}	[10]
(United Kingdom) K Skupski (United Kingdom) N Skupski	7^{11}	6^{5}	[4]

Final
(Belgium) R Bemelmans (Germany) P Petzschner	6	6
(Australia) R Junaid (Slovakia) I Zelenay	3	1
