= 2015 Ethias Trophy =

- Date: 5 October – 11 October
- Edition: 11th
- Surface: Hard
- Location: Mons, Belgium

Champions

Singles
- (Ukraine) Illya Marchenko

Doubles
- (Belgium) Ruben Bemelmans / (Germany) Philipp Petzschner
← 2014 ·	Ethias Trophy	· 2016 →

The 2015 Ethias Trophy was a professional tennis tournament played on hard courts. It was the eleventh edition of the tournament which was part of the 2015 ATP Challenger Tour. It took place in Mons, Belgium between 5 October and 11 October 2015.

== Singles main-draw entrants ==
=== Seeds ===
Country	Player	Rank^{1}	Seed
BEL	Steve Darcis	56	1
~~POL~~	~~Jerzy Janowicz~~	~~68~~	~~2~~
GER	Benjamin Becker	74	3
ESP	Marcel Granollers	79	4
TUR	Marsel İlhan	82	5
TUN	Malek Jaziri	83	6
BEL	Ruben Bemelmans	84	7
FRA	Paul-Henri Mathieu	96	8

- ^{1} Rankings are as of September 28, 2015.

=== Other entrants ===
The following players received wildcards into the singles main draw:

- (Belgium) Germain Gigounon
- (Belgium) Niels Desein
- (Belgium) Maxime Authom
- (Belgium) Clément Geens

The following players received entry using a special exempt into the singles main draw:

- (Austria) Dennis Novak
- (Germany) Benjamin Becker

The following players received entry from the qualifying draw:

- (France) Maxime Tabatruong
- (Russia) Karen Khachanov
- (Belgium) Yannick Mertens
- (France) Maxime Teixeira

The following players received entry as lucky losers:

- (Russia) Aslan Karatsev
- (France) Sadio Doumbia

== Champions ==
=== Singles ===
- (Ukraine) Illya Marchenko def. (Germany) Benjamin Becker, 6–2, 6–7^{(8–10)}, 6–4

=== Doubles ===
- (Belgium) Ruben Bemelmans / (Germany) Philipp Petzschner def. (Australia) Rameez Junaid / (Slovakia) Igor Zelenay, 6–3, 6–1
