= 2009 Ethias Trophy =

- Date: 5–11 October
- Edition: 5th
- Location: Mons, Belgium

Champions

Singles
- (Serbia) Janko Tipsarević

Doubles
- (Uzbekistan) Denis Istomin / (Russia) Evgeny Korolev
← 2008 ·	Ethias Trophy	· 2010 →

The 2009 Ethias Trophy was a professional tennis tournament played on indoor hard courts. It was the fifth edition of the tournament which was part of the Tretorn SERIE+ of the 2009 ATP Challenger Tour. It took place in Mons, Belgium between 5 and 11 October 2009.

== Singles main-draw entrants ==
=== Seeds ===
Country	Player	Rank^{1}	Seed
SRB	Janko Tipsarević	55	1
ITA	Simone Bolelli	63	2
RUS	Evgeny Korolev	66	3
FRA	Marc Gicquel	68	4
RUS	Teymuraz Gabashvili	80	5
BEL	Olivier Rochus	81	6
FRA	Florent Serra	82	7
BEL	Christophe Rochus	84	8

- Rankings are as of September 28, 2009.

=== Other entrants ===
The following players received wildcards into the singles main draw:

- (Belgium) Ruben Bemelmans
- (Belgium) Arthur de Greef
- (Belgium) David Goffin
- (Belgium) Yannick Vandenbulcke

The following players received entry from the qualifying draw:

- (Ukraine) Sergei Bubka
- (France) Jérôme Haehnel
- (Slovakia) Dominik Hrbatý
- (Ukraine) Illya Marchenko

== Champions ==
=== Singles ===
(Serbia) Janko Tipsarević def. (Ukraine) Sergiy Stakhovsky, 7–6(4), 6–3

=== Doubles ===
(Uzbekistan) Denis Istomin / (Russia) Evgeny Korolev def. (Colombia) Alejandro Falla / (Russia) Teymuraz Gabashvili, 6–7(4), 7–6(4), [11–9]
