= 2013 Ethias Trophy – Doubles =

Doubles
- 2013 Ethias Trophy

Final
- Champions: (Netherlands) Jesse Huta Galung (Netherlands) Igor Sijsling
- Runners-up: (United States) Eric Butorac (South Africa) Raven Klaasen
- Score: 4–6, 7–6^{(7–2)}, [10–7]

Events
| Singles | Doubles |
| ← 2012 · | Ethias Trophy | · 2014 → |

Tomasz Bednarek and Jerzy Janowicz were the defending champions but decided Janowicz not to participate.
Bednarek partnered with Filip Polášek, but lost in the first round.

Jesse Huta Galung and Igor Sijsling won the title, defeating Eric Butorac and Raven Klaasen in the final, 4–6, 7–6^{(7–2)}, [10–7].

== Seeds ==
1. (Colombia) Juan Sebastián Cabal / (Colombia) Robert Farah (quarterfinals)
2. (United States) Eric Butorac / (South Africa) Raven Klaasen (final)
3. (Poland) Tomasz Bednarek / (Slovakia) Filip Polášek (first round)
4. (United States) Nicholas Monroe / (Germany) Simon Stadler (semifinals)

== Draw ==
=== Key ===
- Q = Qualifier
- WC = Wild card
- LL = Lucky loser
- Alt = Alternate
- SE = Special exempt
- PR = Protected ranking
- ITF = ITF entry
- JE = Junior exempt
- w/o = Walkover
- r = Retired
- d = Defaulted
- SR = Special ranking

=== Draw ===
First round
1 | (Colombia) JS Cabal (Colombia) R Farah | 6 | 6
(Belgium) K Coppejans (Belgium) X Malisse | 4 | 4
(Canada) A Shamasdin (Sweden) A Siljeström | 6 | 3 | [5]
(Netherlands) J Huta Galung (Netherlands) I Sijsling | 4 | 6 | [10]
3 | (Poland) T Bednarek (Slovakia) F Polášek | 6 | 4 | [9]
(Germany) C Kas (Austria) O Marach | 4 | 6 | [11]
(Australia) R Junaid (Germany) F Moser | 6 | 6
(Poland) M Kowalczyk (Slovakia) I Zelenay | 4 | 4
(Russia) T Gabashvili (Kazakhstan) M Kukushkin | 4 | 4
PR | (Germany) A Beck (Germany) T Kamke | 6 | 6
(Sweden) J Brunström (Romania) F Mergea | 4 | 3
4 | (United States) N Monroe (Germany) S Stadler | 6 | 6
(Germany) D Brown (Germany) P Marx | 6 | 6
WC | (Belgium) G Gigounon (Belgium) O Rochus | 3 | 4
WC | (Belgium) M Authom (Belgium) R Bemelmans | 2 | 0
2 | (United States) E Butorac (South Africa) R Klaasen | 6 | 6

Quarterfinals
1 | (Colombia) JS Cabal (Colombia) R Farah | 5 | 1
(Netherlands) J Huta Galung (Netherlands) I Sijsling | 7 | 6
(Germany) C Kas (Austria) O Marach | 7^{7} | 6
(Australia) R Junaid (Germany) F Moser | 6^{1} | 3
PR | (Germany) A Beck (Germany) T Kamke | 4 | 4
4 | (United States) N Monroe (Germany) S Stadler | 6 | 6
(Germany) D Brown (Germany) P Marx | 3 | 3
2 | (United States) E Butorac (South Africa) R Klaasen | 6 | 6

Semifinals
(Netherlands) J Huta Galung (Netherlands) I Sijsling | 6 | 6
(Germany) C Kas (Austria) O Marach | 4 | 4
4 | (United States) N Monroe (Germany) S Stadler | 3 | 4
2 | (United States) E Butorac (South Africa) R Klaasen | 6 | 6

Final
(Netherlands) J Huta Galung (Netherlands) I Sijsling | 4 | 7^{7} | [10]
2 | (United States) E Butorac (South Africa) R Klaasen | 6 | 6^{2} | [7]
