= 2016 Ethias Trophy =

- Date: 3 October – 9 October
- Edition: 12th
- Surface: Hard
- Location: Mons, Belgium

Champions

Singles
- (Germany) Jan-Lennard Struff

Doubles
- (Austria) Julian Knowle / (Austria) Jürgen Melzer
← 2015 ·	Ethias Trophy

The 2016 Ethias Trophy was a professional tennis tournament played on hard courts. It was the twelfth edition of the tournament which was part of the 2016 ATP Challenger Tour. It took place in Mons, Belgium between 3 October and 9 October 2016.

== Singles main-draw entrants ==
=== Seeds ===
Country	Player	Rank^{1}	Seed
UKR	Illya Marchenko	49	1
GER	Dustin Brown	67	2
FRA	Paul-Henri Mathieu	68	3
FRA	Jérémy Chardy	75	4
LTU	Ričardas Berankis	78	5
GER	Jan-Lennard Struff	84	6
CRO	Ivan Dodig	90	7
MDA	Radu Albot	100	8

- ^{1} Rankings are as of September 26, 2016.

=== Other entrants ===
The following players received wildcards into the singles main draw:

- (Ukraine) Illya Marchenko
- (Belgium) Yannik Reuter
- (Belgium) Ruben Bemelmans
- (Belgium) Clément Geens

The following players received entry into the singles main draw using a protected ranking:

- (Austria) Jürgen Melzer
- (Poland) Jerzy Janowicz

The following players received entry using a special exempt into the singles main draw:

- (Slovakia) Norbert Gombos
- (Russia) Andrey Rublev

The following players received entry from the qualifying draw:

- (France) Maxime Tabatruong
- (Belgium) Maxime Authom
- (Switzerland) Yann Marti
- (France) Sadio Doumbia

The following player entered as a lucky loser:

- (France) Grégoire Barrère

== Champions ==
=== Singles ===
- (Germany) Jan-Lennard Struff def. (France) Vincent Millot 6–2, 6–0.

=== Doubles ===
- (Austria) Julian Knowle / (Austria) Jürgen Melzer def. (Netherlands) Sander Arends / (Netherlands) Wesley Koolhof, 7–6^{(7–4)}, 7–6^{(7–4)}.
