= 2019 Challenger Eckental – Doubles =

Doubles
- 2019 Challenger Eckental

Final
- Champions: (United Kingdom) Ken Skupski (Australia) John-Patrick Smith
- Runners-up: (Netherlands) Sander Arends (Czech Republic) Roman Jebavý
- Score: 7–6^{(7–2)}, 6–4

Events
| Singles | Doubles |
| ← 2018 · | Challenger Eckental | · 2020 → |

Kevin Krawietz and Andreas Mies were the defending champions but chose not to defend their title.

Ken Skupski and John-Patrick Smith won the title after defeating Sander Arends and Roman Jebavý 7–6^{(7–2)}, 6–4 in the final.

== Seeds ==
1. (Netherlands) Sander Arends / (Czech Republic) Roman Jebavý (final)
2. (United Kingdom) Ken Skupski / (Australia) John-Patrick Smith (champions)
3. (Monaco) Romain Arneodo / (Belarus) Andrei Vasilevski (first round)
4. (Israel) Jonathan Erlich / (Ukraine) Denys Molchanov (quarterfinals)

== Draw ==
=== Key ===
- Q = Qualifier
- WC = Wild card
- LL = Lucky loser
- Alt = Alternate
- ITF = ITF entry
- PR = Protected ranking
- SR = Special ranking
- SE = Special exempt
- JE = Junior exempt
- JR = Junior Accelerator Programme entrant
- CO = College Accelerator Programme entrant
- NG = Next Gen Accelerator Program entrant
- w/o = Walkover
- r = Retired
- d = Defaulted

First round
1 | (Netherlands) S Arends (Czech Republic) R Jebavý | 7 | 6
WC | (Germany) Tim Hofmann (Germany) Jeremy Schifris | 5 | 3
(Bosnia and Herzegovina) T Brkić (Croatia) A Pavić | 3 | 7^{7} | [9]
(Serbia) N Čačić (Croatia) A Šančić | 6 | 6^{5} | [11]
4 | (Israel) J Erlich (Ukraine) D Molchanov | 7^{11} | 7^{7}
PR | (Serbia) V Troicki (Serbia) N Zimonjić | 6^{9} | 6^{4}
(Chile) H Podlipnik Castillo (Austria) T-S Weissborn | 4 | 6^{8}
WC | (Belgium) R Bemelmans (Germany) D Masur | 6 | 7^{10}
Alt | (United States) J Cerretani (United States) M Cressy | 7 | 7^{7}
(South Africa) L Harris (Switzerland) L Margaroli | 5 | 6^{5}
(Germany) A Begemann (Romania) F Mergea | 6 | 6
3 | (Monaco) R Arneodo (Belarus) A Vasilevski | 3 | 4
(United States) N Lammons (United States) N Monroe | 6 | 6
(Poland) K Majchrzak (Poland) S Walków | 4 | 4
WC | (Germany) M Wiskandt (Germany) Leopold Zima | 1 | 2
2 | (United Kingdom) K Skupski (Australia) J-P Smith | 6 | 6

Quarterfinals
1 | (Netherlands) S Arends (Czech Republic) R Jebavý | 6 | 7^{8}
(Serbia) N Čačić (Croatia) A Šančić | 2 | 6^{6}
4 | (Israel) J Erlich (Ukraine) D Molchanov | 2 | 4
WC | (Belgium) R Bemelmans (Germany) D Masur | 6 | 6
Alt | (United States) J Cerretani (United States) M Cressy | 2 | 5
(Germany) A Begemann (Romania) F Mergea | 6 | 7
(United States) N Lammons (United States) N Monroe | 2 | 7^{7} | [3]
2 | (United Kingdom) K Skupski (Australia) J-P Smith | 6 | 6^{4} | [10]

Semifinals
1 | (Netherlands) S Arends (Czech Republic) R Jebavý | 6 | 3 | [10]
WC | (Belgium) R Bemelmans (Germany) D Masur | 4 | 6 | [7]
(Germany) A Begemann (Romania) F Mergea | 6^{4} | 6 | [7]
2 | (United Kingdom) K Skupski (Australia) J-P Smith | 7^{7} | 4 | [10]

Final
1 | (Netherlands) S Arends (Czech Republic) R Jebavý | 6^{2} | 4
2 | (United Kingdom) K Skupski (Australia) J-P Smith | 7^{7} | 6
