= 2012 Ethias Trophy – Singles =

Singles
- 2012 Ethias Trophy

Final
- Champion: (France) Kenny de Schepper
- Runner-up: (France) Michaël Llodra
- Score: 7–6^{(9–7)}, 4–6, 7–6^{(7–4)}

Events
Singles	Doubles
- Ethias Trophy

Andreas Seppi was the defending champion, but chose to compete in the 2012 China Open.
Kenny de Schepper won the title, defeating Michaël Llodra 7–6^{(9–7)}, 4–6, 7–6^{(7–4)} in the final.

== Seeds ==
1. (Belgium) David Goffin (first round)
2. (Belgium) Xavier Malisse (first round)
3. (France) Nicolas Mahut (second round)
4. (Germany) Tobias Kamke (semifinals)
5. (United States) Jesse Levine (first round)
6. (Italy) Simone Bolelli (second round)
7. (Belgium) Steve Darcis (second round)
8. (Poland) Jerzy Janowicz (quarterfinals)

== Draw ==
Key

- Q = Qualifier
- WC = Wild card
- LL = Lucky loser
- Alt = Alternate
- ITF = ITF entry
- PR = Protected ranking
- SR = Special ranking
- SE = Special exempt
- JE = Junior exempt
- JR = Junior Accelerator Programme entrant
- CO = College Accelerator Programme entrant
- NG = Next Gen Accelerator Program entrant
- w/o = Walkover
- r = Retired
- d = Defaulted

=== Finals ===
Semifinals
(France) Michaël Llodra	7	6
4	(Germany) Tobias Kamke	5	2
Q	(France) Kenny de Schepper	6	4	6
(Belgium) Olivier Rochus	4	6	3

Final
(France) Michaël Llodra	6^{7}	6	6^{4}
Q	(France) Kenny de Schepper	7^{9}	4	7^{7}

=== Top half ===
First round
1	(Belgium) D Goffin	3	4
(France) M Llodra	6	6
Q	(Ukraine) I Marchenko	6	6
(Lithuania) R Berankis	2	4
(Netherlands) I Sijsling	6	7^{7}
WC	(Belgium) Y Mertens	4	6^{4}
(Belgium) R Bemelmans	2	6	3
7	(Belgium) S Darcis	6	4	6
4	(Germany) T Kamke	5	3
(France) P-H Mathieu	7	0^{r}
WC	(Belgium) Y Reuter	6	6
(Austria) A Haider-Maurer	4	3
(Russia) E Donskoy	6	6
SE	(Ukraine) O Nedovyesov	3	2
(Germany) D Brands	3	4
8	(Poland) J Janowicz	6	6

Second round
(France) M Llodra	6	6^{5}	6
Q	(Ukraine) I Marchenko	1	7^{7}	3
(Netherlands) I Sijsling	6	6
7	(Belgium) S Darcis	3	4
4	(Germany) T Kamke	6	7
WC	(Belgium) Y Reuter	0	5
(Russia) E Donskoy	5	7^{7}	6^{4}
8	(Poland) J Janowicz	7	6^{4}	7^{7}

Quarterfinals
(France) M Llodra	6	6
(Netherlands) I Sijsling	4	3
4	(Germany) T Kamke	6	6
8	(Poland) J Janowicz	3	3

Semifinals
(France) M Llodra	7	6
4	(Germany) T Kamke	5	2

=== Bottom half ===
First round
5	(United States) J Levine	4	7	3
WC	(Belgium) M Authom	6	5	6
(Czech Republic) L Rosol	6	6
WC	(Belgium) A De Greef	4	4
Q	(France) K de Schepper	6	6
Q	(Kazakhstan) E Korolev	0	3
Q	(France) A Mannarino	1	2
3	(France) N Mahut	6	6
6	(Italy) S Bolelli	6	3
(France) J Ouanna	4	1^{r}
SE	(Germany) J-L Struff	5	4
(Belgium) O Rochus	7	6
(Germany) M Bachinger	5	6	4
(France) F Serra	7	4	6
(France) É Roger-Vasselin	7^{7}	6
2	(Belgium) X Malisse	6^{4}	4

Second round
WC	(Belgium) M Authom	7	3	7^{7}
(Czech Republic) L Rosol	5	6	6^{5}
Q	(France) K de Schepper	7^{7}	6
3	(France) N Mahut	6^{4}	3
6	(Italy) S Bolelli	4	2
(Belgium) O Rochus	6	6
(France) F Serra	3	1
(France) É Roger-Vasselin	6	6

Quarterfinals
WC	(Belgium) M Authom	5	6^{5}
Q	(France) K de Schepper	7	7^{7}
(Belgium) O Rochus	6	2	6
(France) É Roger-Vasselin	2	6	4

Semifinals
Q	(France) K de Schepper	6	4	6
(Belgium) O Rochus	4	6	3
