= 2019 Challenger Eckental – Singles =

Singles
- 2019 Challenger Eckental

Final
- Champion: (Czech Republic) Jiří Veselý
- Runner-up: (Belgium) Steve Darcis
- Score: 6–4, 4–6, 6–3

Events
Singles	Doubles
← 2018 ·	Challenger Eckental	· 2020 →

Antoine Hoang was the defending champion but chose not to defend his title.

Jiří Veselý won the title after defeating Steve Darcis 6–4, 4–6, 6–3 in the final.

== Seeds ==
All seeds receive a bye into the second round.

1. (Poland) Kamil Majchrzak (third round)
2. (Switzerland) Henri Laaksonen (third round)
3. (South Africa) Lloyd Harris (semifinals)
4. (Germany) Peter Gojowczyk (quarterfinals)
5. (Germany) Yannick Maden (second round)
6. (Russia) Evgeny Donskoy (second round)
7. (Czech Republic) Jiří Veselý (champion)
8. (Austria) Dennis Novak (second round)
9. (Belarus) Ilya Ivashka (third round)
10. (Ukraine) Sergiy Stakhovsky (second round)
11. (Finland) Emil Ruusuvuori (third round)
12. (Czech Republic) Lukáš Rosol (second round)
13. (Italy) Federico Gaio (second round)
14. (Serbia) Viktor Troicki (second round)
15. (Germany) Oscar Otte (third round)
16. (Austria) Sebastian Ofner (third round)

== Draw ==
=== Key ===
- Q = Qualifier
- WC = Wild card
- LL = Lucky loser
- Alt = Alternate
- ITF = ITF entry
- PR = Protected ranking
- SR = Special ranking
- SE = Special exempt
- JE = Junior exempt
- JR = Junior Accelerator Programme entrant
- CO = College Accelerator Programme entrant
- NG = Next Gen Accelerator Program entrant
- w/o = Walkover
- r = Retired
- d = Defaulted

=== Finals ===
Quarterfinals
(Belgium) Steve Darcis	6^{4}	7^{7}	6
(Ukraine) Illya Marchenko	7^{7}	6^{3}	3
3	(South Africa) Lloyd Harris	6^{5}	6	6
(Slovakia) Lukáš Lacko	7^{7}	3	3
(Russia) Evgeny Karlovskiy	4	6	6
4	(Germany) Peter Gojowczyk	6	2	2
7	(Czech Republic) Jiří Veselý	3	6	6
(Netherlands) Botic van de Zandschulp	6	3	4

Semifinals
(Belgium) Steve Darcis	6	6
3	(South Africa) Lloyd Harris	2	4
(Russia) Evgeny Karlovskiy	6	4	6^{6}
7	(Czech Republic) Jiří Veselý	4	6	7^{8}

Final
(Belgium) Steve Darcis	4	6	3
7	(Czech Republic) Jiří Veselý	6	4	6

=== Top half ===
==== Section 1 ====
First round
(Bosnia and Herzegovina) M Bašić	6	3	6^{4}
Alt	(Switzerland) M-A Hüsler	3	6	7^{7}
(United Kingdom) J Ward	5	6^{4}
(Belgium) S Darcis	7	7^{7}
(Ukraine) I Marchenko	6	6
(Austria) L Miedler	1	2
(Croatia) V Galović	2	2
(Czech Republic) Z Kolář	6	6

Second round
1	(Poland) K Majchrzak	7	6^{5}	6
Alt	(Switzerland) M-A Hüsler	5	7^{7}	3
(Belgium) S Darcis	6	6
13	(Italy) F Gaio	2	3
10	(Ukraine) S Stakhovsky	4	6^{3}
(Ukraine) I Marchenko	6	7^{7}
(Czech Republic) Z Kolář	4	6	7^{11}
6	(Russia) E Donskoy	6	4	6^{9}

Third round
1	(Poland) K Majchrzak	6	2	5
(Belgium) S Darcis	3	6	7
(Ukraine) I Marchenko	5	6	6
(Czech Republic) Z Kolář	7	3	4

Quarterfinals
(Belgium) S Darcis	6^{4}	7^{7}	6
(Ukraine) I Marchenko	7^{7}	6^{3}	3

==== Section 2 ====
First round
(Italy) S Napolitano	7	6
(Croatia) N Serdarušić	5	4
(Belgium) R Bemelmans	6	6
(Russia) A Karatsev	2	3
(Australia) J-P Smith	7^{7}	6^{2}	7^{7}
WC	(Germany) J Härteis	6^{3}	7^{7}	6^{5}
(Slovakia) L Lacko	6	6
LL	(Germany) M Wiskandt	4	1

Second round
3	(South Africa) L Harris	6	6
(Italy) S Napolitano	2	4
(Belgium) R Bemelmans	6	2	3
15	(Germany) O Otte	4	6	6
12	(Czech Republic) L Rosol	4	2
(Australia) J-P Smith	6	6
(Slovakia) L Lacko	6	4	6
8	(Austria) D Novak	4	6	4

Third round
3	(South Africa) L Harris	4	6	7^{7}
15	(Germany) O Otte	6	4	6^{3}
(Australia) J-P Smith	5	3
(Slovakia) L Lacko	7	6

Quarterfinals
3	(South Africa) L Harris	6^{5}	6	6
(Slovakia) L Lacko	7^{7}	3	3

=== Bottom half ===
==== Section 3 ====
First round
(Germany) D Masur	7^{10}	6^{2}	1
(Russia) E Karlovskiy	6^{8}	7^{7}	6
(Germany) J Lenz	7^{8}	6
Q	(Norway) V Durasovic	6^{6}	2
WC	(Germany) Leopold Zima	4	6^{6}
(Austria) J Rodionov	6	7^{8}
(Turkey) C İlkel	6	6
WC	(Germany) Jeremy Schifris	4	2

Second round
5	(Germany) Y Maden	4	3
(Russia) E Karlovskiy	6	6
(Germany) J Lenz	5	6	4
11	(Finland) E Ruusuvuori	7	4	6
16	(Austria) S Ofner	6^{5}	7	3
(Austria) J Rodionov	7^{7}	5	0^{r}
(Turkey) C İlkel	4	7^{7}	5
4	(Germany) P Gojowczyk	6	6^{5}	7

Third round
(Russia) E Karlovskiy	4	6	6
11	(Finland) E Ruusuvuori	6	2	4
16	(Austria) S Ofner	1	4
4	(Germany) P Gojowczyk	6	6

Quarterfinals
(Russia) E Karlovskiy	4	6	6
4	(Germany) P Gojowczyk	6	2	2

==== Section 4 ====
First round
(Germany) T Kamke	7^{7}	6
(Germany) M Zverev	6^{4}	1
Q	(Czech Republic) T Macháč	6	6
(Russia) P Kotov	3	4
(Netherlands) B van de Zandschulp	6	6^{6}	7^{7}
WC	(Germany) Tobias Simon	4	7^{8}	6^{5}
(United States) M Cressy	6	7
WC	(Germany) Niklas Guttau	3	5

Second round
7	(Czech Republic) J Veselý	6	6
(Germany) T Kamke	3	3
Q	(Czech Republic) T Macháč	3	0
9	(Belarus) I Ivashka	6	6
14	(Serbia) V Troicki	6	3	4
(Netherlands) B van de Zandschulp	3	6	6
(United States) M Cressy	4	7	6^{3}
2	(Switzerland) H Laaksonen	6	5	7^{7}

Third round
7	(Czech Republic) J Veselý	7^{7}	6
9	(Belarus) I Ivashka	6^{2}	2
(Netherlands) B van de Zandschulp	7^{7}	4	7^{7}
2	(Switzerland) H Laaksonen	6^{3}	6	6^{2}

Quarterfinals
7	(Czech Republic) J Veselý	3	6	6
(Netherlands) B van de Zandschulp	6	3	4
