= 2009 UniCredit Czech Open – Singles =

Singles
- 2009 UniCredit Czech Open

Final
- Champion: (Czech Republic) Jan Hájek
- Runner-up: (Belgium) Steve Darcis
- Score: 6–2, 1–6, 6–4

Events
Singles	Doubles
- UniCredit Czech Open

The defending champion Agustín Calleri was eliminated in the first round.
Jan Hájek, the 2006 singles champion, came from the qualifying round to beat in the final Belgian player Steve Darcis by 6–2, 1–6, 6–4.

== Seeds ==
1. (Czech Republic) Radek Štěpánek (first round)
2. (Czech Republic) Tomáš Berdych (semifinals)
3. (Russia) Igor Andreev (withdrew)
4. (Croatia) Ivan Ljubičić (quarterfinals)
5. (Portugal) Frederico Gil (first round)
6. (Czech Republic) Ivo Minář (second round)
7. (Kazakhstan) Andrey Golubev (first round)
8. (Spain) Iván Navarro (quarterfinals)

== Draw ==
Key

- Q = Qualifier
- WC = Wild card
- LL = Lucky loser
- Alt = Alternate
- ITF = ITF entry
- PR = Protected ranking
- SR = Special ranking
- SE = Special exempt
- JE = Junior exempt
- JR = Junior Accelerator Programme entrant
- CO = College Accelerator Programme entrant
- NG = Next Gen Accelerator Program entrant
- w/o = Walkover
- r = Retired
- d = Defaulted

=== Final four ===
Semifinals
(Italy) Potito Starace	4	5
Q	(Czech Republic) Jan Hájek	6	7
(Belgium) Steve Darcis	7	7
2/WC	(Czech Republic) Tomáš Berdych	6^{7}	6^{3}

Final
Q	(Czech Republic) Jan Hájek	6	1	6
(Belgium) Steve Darcis	2	6	4

=== Top half ===
First round
1/WC	(Czech Republic) R Štěpánek	6	1^{r}
(Uruguay) P Cuevas	2	1
(Argentina) H Zeballos	2	4
(Italy) P Starace	6	6
ALT	(Italy) F Cipolla	2	0
(Chile) N Massú	6	6
(Spain) A Martín	7	6^{3}	6
7	(Kazakhstan) A Golubev	6^{2}	7	2
4	(Croatia) I Ljubičić	6	6
(Argentina) B Dabul	3	4
SE	(Slovenia) B Kavčič	6	6^{4}	7
WC	(Poland) J Janowicz	4	7	5
Q	(Czech Republic) J Hájek	6^{7}	6	6
Q	(Czech Republic) J Minář	7	2	1
(Spain) D Gimeno-Traver	6	6
5	(Portugal) F Gil	3	3

Second round
(Uruguay) P Cuevas	6	5	2
(Italy) P Starace	3	7	6
(Chile) N Massú	3	2
(Spain) A Martín	6	6
4	(Croatia) I Ljubičić	6	7
SE	(Slovenia) B Kavčič	3	5
Q	(Czech Republic) J Hájek	6	6
(Spain) D Gimeno-Traver	3	1

Quarterfinals
(Italy) P Starace	6	6
(Spain) A Martín	4	4
4	(Croatia) I Ljubičić	3	3
Q	(Czech Republic) J Hájek	6	6

Semifinals
(Italy) P Starace	4	5
Q	(Czech Republic) J Hájek	6	7

=== Bottom half ===
First round
8	(Spain) I Navarro	4
(Romania) V Crivoi	0^{r}
(Spain) M Granollers	7	7
(Slovakia) D Hrbatý	6^{6}	5
(Belgium) S Darcis	6	6
(Portugal) R Machado	4	4
Q	(Ukraine) I Sergeyev	6	3	6^{4}
LL	(Spain) P Santos	3	6	7
6	(Czech Republic) I Minář	7	3
(Argentina) S Roitman	6^{0}	1^{r}
(Czech Republic) P Šnobel	3	3
Q	(Slovakia) M Kližan	6	6
(Argentina) A Calleri	1	1
(Brazil) T Bellucci	6	6
(Belgium) O Rochus	6	3	0
2/WC	(Czech Republic) T Berdych	4	6	6

Second round
8	(Spain) I Navarro	6	4	6
(Spain) M Granollers	2	6	4
(Belgium) S Darcis	6	6
LL	(Spain) P Santos	2	4
6	(Czech Republic) I Minář	3	7	5
Q	(Slovakia) M Kližan	6	6^{4}	7
(Brazil) T Bellucci	3	6	5
2/WC	(Czech Republic) T Berdych	6	2	7

Quarterfinals
8	(Spain) I Navarro	3	4
(Belgium) S Darcis	6	6
Q	(Slovakia) M Kližan	3	6^{3}
2/WC	(Czech Republic) T Berdych	6	7

Semifinals
(Belgium) S Darcis	7	7
2/WC	(Czech Republic) T Berdych	6^{7}	6^{3}
