= 2009 UniCredit Czech Open – Doubles =

Doubles
- 2009 UniCredit Czech Open

Final
- Champions: (Sweden) Johan Brunström (Netherlands Antilles) Jean-Julien Rojer
- Runners-up: (Uruguay) Pablo Cuevas (Slovakia) Dominik Hrbatý
- Score: 6–2, 6–3

Events
Singles	Doubles
← 2008 ·	UniCredit Czech Open	· 2010 →

Rik de Voest and Łukasz Kubot were the defending champions but did not participate this year.
In the final, 2nd-seeded pair Johan Brunström and Jean-Julien Rojer defeated Pablo Cuevas and Dominik Hrbatý in two sets, by 6–2, 6–3.

== Seeds ==
1. (Czech Republic) František Čermák / (Slovakia) Michal Mertiňák (quarterfinals, withdrew)
2. (Sweden) Johan Brunström / (Netherlands Antilles) Jean-Julien Rojer (champions)
3. (Czech Republic) Jaroslav Levinský / (Slovakia) Igor Zelenay (first round)
4. (United States) James Cerretani / (United States) David Martin (first round)

== Draw ==
=== Key ===
- Q = Qualifier
- WC = Wild card
- LL = Lucky loser
- Alt = Alternate
- SE = Special exempt
- PR = Protected ranking
- ITF = ITF entry
- JE = Junior exempt
- w/o = Walkover
- r = Retired
- d = Defaulted
- SR = Special ranking

=== Finals ===
First round
1	(Czech Republic) F Čermák (Slovakia) M Mertiňák	6	6
(Spain) D Gimeno-Traver (Spain) I Navarro	3	4
(Spain) A Martín (Spain) C Poch-Gradin	7	6
WC	(Czech Republic) M Navratil (Spain) R Rumler	5	0
3	(Czech Republic) J Levinský (Slovakia) I Zelenay	4	6^{7}
(Uruguay) P Cuevas (Slovakia) D Hrbatý	6	7
WC	(Czech Republic) J Hájek (Czech Republic) R Jebavý	5	6	8
(Kazakhstan) A Golubev (Italy) P Starace	7	3	10
(Portugal) F Gil (Portugal) R Machado	6	5	9
WC	(Czech Republic) L Friedl (Czech Republic) D Škoch	3	7	11
(Argentina) A Calleri (Chile) N Massú	6	6
4	(United States) J Cerretani (United States) D Martin	4	4
(Argentina) B Dabul (Argentina) H Zeballos	3	5
(Argentina) S Prieto (Argentina) S Roitman	6	7
(Spain) M Granollers (Spain) P Santos	4	2
2	(Sweden) J Brunström (Netherlands Antilles) J-J Rojer	6	6

Quarterfinals
1	(Czech Republic) F Čermák (Slovakia) M Mertiňák
(Spain) A Martín (Spain) C Poch-Gradin	w/o
(Uruguay) P Cuevas (Slovakia) D Hrbatý	6	6
(Kazakhstan) A Golubev (Italy) P Starace	1	4
WC	(Czech Republic) L Friedl (Czech Republic) D Škoch	6	6
(Argentina) A Calleri (Chile) N Massú	1	3
(Argentina) S Prieto (Argentina) S Roitman	4	3
2	(Sweden) J Brunström (Netherlands Antilles) J-J Rojer	6	6

Semifinals
(Spain) A Martín (Spain) C Poch-Gradin	6^{3}	3
(Uruguay) P Cuevas (Slovakia) D Hrbatý	7	6
WC	(Czech Republic) L Friedl (Czech Republic) D Škoch	3	0
2	(Sweden) J Brunström (Netherlands Antilles) J-J Rojer	6	6

Final
(Uruguay) P Cuevas (Slovakia) D Hrbatý	2	3
2	(Sweden) J Brunström (Netherlands Antilles) J-J Rojer	6	6
