= 2010 Ethias Trophy =

Tennis tournament

- Date: 4–11 October
- Edition: 6th
- Location: Mons, Belgium

Champions

Singles
- (France) Adrian Mannarino

Doubles
- (Slovakia) Filip Polášek / (Slovakia) Igor Zelenay
- Ethias Trophy

The 2010 Ethias Trophy was a professional tennis tournament played on indoor hard courts. It was the sixth edition of the tournament which was part of the Tretorn SERIE+ of the 2010 ATP Challenger Tour. It took place in Mons, Belgium between 4 and 11 October 2010.

== Singles main-draw entrants ==
=== Seeds ===
Country	Player	Rank^{1}	Seed
BEL	Xavier Malisse	50	1
FRA	Arnaud Clément	61	2
BEL	Olivier Rochus	78	3
GER	Daniel Brands	81	4
FRA	Stéphane Robert	95	5
GER	Björn Phau	101	6
GER	Andreas Beck	116	7
JAM	Dustin Brown	118	8

- Rankings are as of September 27, 2010.

=== Other entrants ===
The following players received wildcards into the singles main draw:

- (Belgium) Ruben Bemelmans
- (Belgium) David Goffin
- (Belgium) Christophe Rochus
- (Belgium) Kristof Vliegen

The following players received entry from the qualifying draw:

- (United States) Brian Battistone
- (Switzerland) Adrien Bossel
- (Belgium) Yannick Mertens
- (Austria) Martin Slanar
- (France) Marc Gicquel (Lucky loser replacing Xavier Malisse)

== Champions ==
=== Singles ===
(France) Adrian Mannarino def. (Belgium) Steve Darcis, 7–5, 6–2

=== Doubles ===
(Slovakia) Filip Polášek / (Slovakia) Igor Zelenay def. (Belgium) Ruben Bemelmans / (Belgium) Yannick Mertens, 3–6, 6–4, [10–5]
