= 2014 Ethias Trophy – Singles =

Singles
- 2014 Ethias Trophy

Final
- Champion: (Belgium) David Goffin
- Runner-up: (Belgium) Steve Darcis
- Score: 6–3, 6–3

Events
Singles	Doubles
- Ethias Trophy

Radek Štěpánek was the defending champion but chose not to participate.

David Goffin won his 4th title of the year, defeating compatriot Steve Darcis in the final 6–3, 6–3.

== Seeds ==
1. (Belgium) David Goffin (champion)
2. (Netherlands) Igor Sijsling (second round)
3. (Czech Republic) Jiří Veselý (semifinals)
4. (Brazil) Thomaz Bellucci (second round)
5. (Israel) Dudi Sela (first round)
6. (France) ~~Paul-Henri Mathieu~~ (withdrew)
7. (Austria) Andreas Haider-Maurer (second round)
8. (Germany) Dustin Brown (second round)
9. (Germany) Tobias Kamke (quarterfinals)

== Draw ==
Key

- Q = Qualifier
- WC = Wild card
- LL = Lucky loser
- Alt = Alternate
- ITF = ITF entry
- PR = Protected ranking
- SR = Special ranking
- SE = Special exempt
- JE = Junior exempt
- JR = Junior Accelerator Programme entrant
- CO = College Accelerator Programme entrant
- NG = Next Gen Accelerator Program entrant
- w/o = Walkover
- r = Retired
- d = Defaulted

=== Finals ===
Semifinals
1/WC	(Belgium) David Goffin	7	4	6
(Turkey) Marsel İlhan	5	6	1
3	(Czech Republic) Jiří Veselý	4	4
PR	(Belgium) Steve Darcis	6	6

Final
1/WC	(Belgium) David Goffin	6	6
PR	(Belgium) Steve Darcis	3	3

=== Top half ===
First round
1/WC	(Belgium) D Goffin	7^{7}	6
LL	(Netherlands) J Huta Galung	6^{1}	0
(France) N Mahut	3	6	6^{3}
Q	(Germany) M Bachinger	6	3	7^{7}
(Serbia) I Bozoljac	6^{4}	7^{7}	3
(Germany) A Zverev	7^{7}	6^{5}	6
(Slovakia) N Gomboš	6^{3}	3
8	(Germany) D Brown	7^{7}	6
4	(Brazil) T Bellucci	6	7^{7}
(France) K de Schepper	4	6^{4}
Alt	(Czech Republic) J Pospíšil	4	6^{4}
(Turkey) M İlhan	6	7^{7}
(Ukraine) I Marchenko	6	3	4
Q	(Italy) A Arnaboldi	4	6	6
(Uzbekistan) F Dustov	1	6^{3}
9	(Germany) T Kamke	6	7^{7}

Second round
1/WC	(Belgium) D Goffin	7	6
Q	(Germany) M Bachinger	5	2
(Germany) A Zverev	7^{9}	6
8	(Germany) D Brown	6^{7}	3
4	(Brazil) T Bellucci	6^{7}	4
(Turkey) M İlhan	7^{9}	6
Q	(Italy) A Arnaboldi	1	4
9	(Germany) T Kamke	6	6

Quarterfinals
1/WC	(Belgium) D Goffin	6	6
(Germany) A Zverev	3	2
(Turkey) M İlhan	6	7^{7}
9	(Germany) T Kamke	4	6^{3}

Semifinals
1/WC	(Belgium) D Goffin	7	4	6
(Turkey) M İlhan	5	6	1

=== Bottom half ===
First round
7	(Austria) A Haider-Maurer	6	6
WC	(Belgium) J Cagnina	3	4
(Romania) A Ungur	2	6	6^{3}
(Belgium) R Bemelmans	6	4	7^{7}
Q	(France) M Teixeira	6	6^{3}	2
LL	(Belarus) U Ignatik	2	7^{7}	6
(France) V Millot	3	6	4
3	(Czech Republic) J Veselý	6	4	6
5	(Israel) D Sela	1	6^{3}
PR	(Belgium) S Darcis	6	7^{7}
Q	(Switzerland) Y Marti	6	0	6
WC	(Belgium) K Coppejans	4	6	1
WC	(Belgium) O Rochus	6	3	3
(Austria) G Melzer	4	6	6
(Germany) M Berrer	6^{3}	3
2	(Netherlands) I Sijsling	7^{7}	6

Second round
7	(Austria) A Haider-Maurer	4	5
(Belgium) R Bemelmans	6	7
LL	(Belarus) U Ignatik	6	3	6^{3}
3	(Czech Republic) J Veselý	4	6	7^{7}
PR	(Belgium) S Darcis	6	6
Q	(Switzerland) Y Marti	2	4
(Austria) G Melzer	6	1	7
2	(Netherlands) I Sijsling	4	6	5

Quarterfinals
(Belgium) R Bemelmans	4	6	6^{3}
3	(Czech Republic) J Veselý	6	3	7^{7}
PR	(Belgium) S Darcis	6	6
(Austria) G Melzer	3	2

Semifinals
3	(Czech Republic) J Veselý	4	4
PR	(Belgium) S Darcis	6	6
