= Ethias Trophy =

Defunct tennis tournament
- Event name: Mons
- Location: Mons, Belgium
- Venue: Lotto Mons Expo
- Category: ATP Challenger Tour, Tretorn SERIE+
- Surface: Hard (i)
- Draw: 32S/32Q/16D
- Prize money: $125,000
- Website: ethiastrophy.be

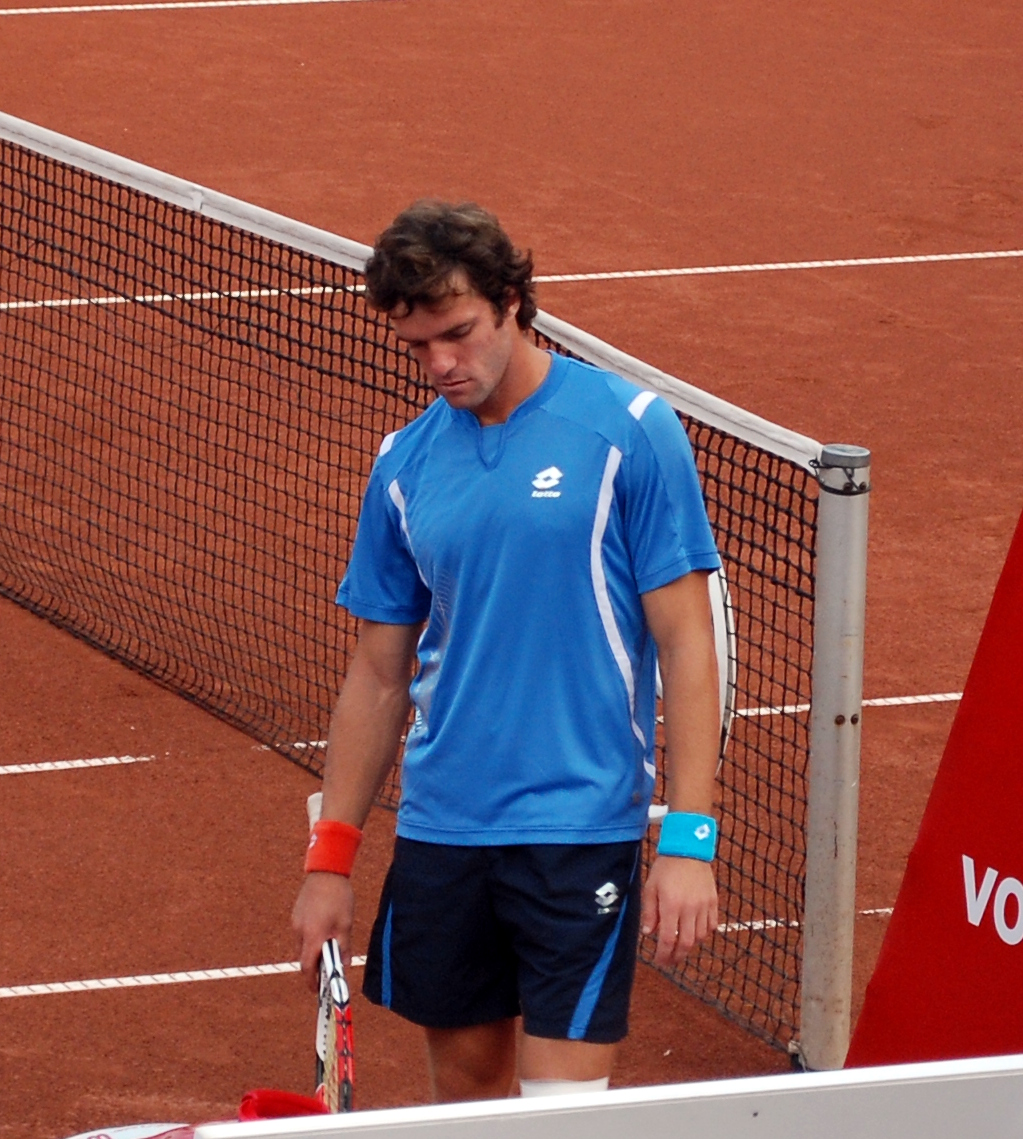
Russian Teymuraz Gabashvili took the 2008 singles titles in Mons over Édouard Roger-Vasselin

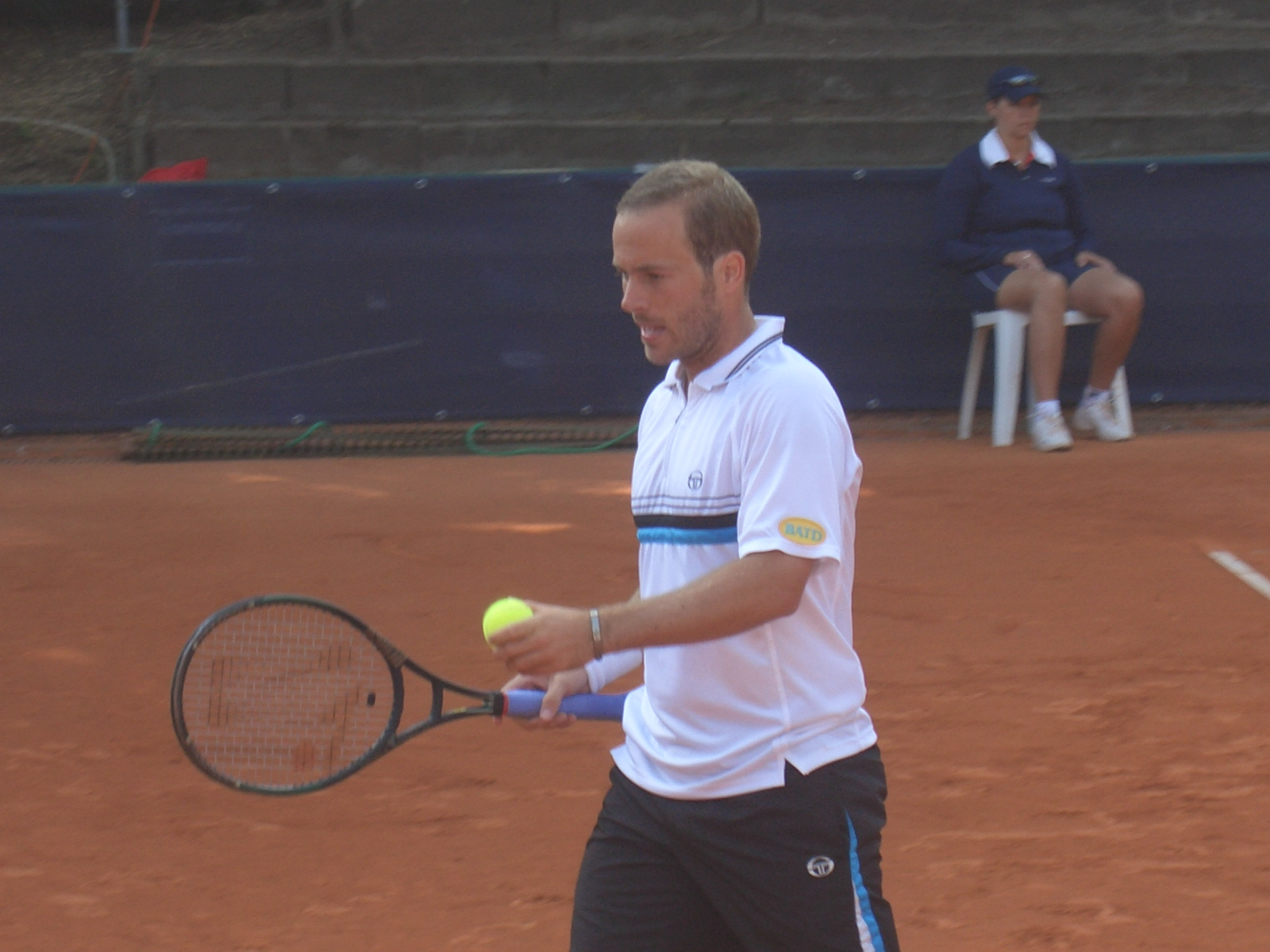
Olivier Rochus won the inaugural event's all-Belgian single final in 2005

The Ethias Trophy was a professional tennis tournament played on indoor hardcourts. It was part of the Association of Tennis Professionals (ATP) Challenger Tour. It was also part of the Tretorn SERIE+ of the Challenger Tour. It was held annually in Mons, Belgium from 2005 until 2016.

== Past finals ==
=== Singles ===
Year	Champion	Runner-up	Score
2016	(Germany) Jan-Lennard Struff	(France) Vincent Millot	6–2, 6–0
2015	(Ukraine) Illya Marchenko	(Germany) Benjamin Becker	6–2, 6–7^{(8–10)}, 6–4
2014	(Belgium) David Goffin	(Belgium) Steve Darcis	6–3, 6–3
2013	(Czech Republic) Radek Štěpánek	(Netherlands) Igor Sijsling	6–3, 7–5
2012	(France) Kenny de Schepper	(France) Michaël Llodra	7–6^{(9–7)}, 4–6, 7–6^{(7–4)}
2011	(Italy) Andreas Seppi	(France) Julien Benneteau	2–6, 6–3, 7–6^{(7–4)}
2010	(France) Adrian Mannarino	(Belgium) Steve Darcis	7–5, 6–2
2009	(Serbia) Janko Tipsarević	(Ukraine) Sergiy Stakhovsky	7–6(4), 6–3
2008	(Russia) Teymuraz Gabashvili	(France) Édouard Roger-Vasselin	6–4, 6–4
2007	(Latvia) Ernests Gulbis	(Belgium) Kristof Vliegen	7–5, 6–3
2006	(Serbia) Janko Tipsarević	(United Kingdom) Alex Bogdanovic	6–4, 1–6, 6–2
2005	(Belgium) Olivier Rochus	(Belgium) Xavier Malisse	6–2, 6–0

=== Doubles ===
Year	Champions	Runners-up	Score
2016	(Austria) Julian Knowle (Austria) Jürgen Melzer	(Netherlands) Sander Arends (Netherlands) Wesley Koolhof	7–6^{(7–4)}, 7–6^{(7–4)}
2015	(Belgium) Ruben Bemelmans (Germany) Philipp Petzschner	(Australia) Rameez Junaid (Slovakia) Igor Zelenay Julian Knowle	6–3, 6–1
2014	(France) Marc Gicquel (France) Nicolas Mahut	(Germany) Andre Begemann (Austria) Julian Knowle	6–3, 6–4
2013	(Netherlands) Jesse Huta Galung (Netherlands) Igor Sijsling	(United States) Eric Butorac (South Africa) Raven Klaasen	4–6, 7–6^{(7–2)}, [10–7]
2012	(Poland) Tomasz Bednarek (Poland) Jerzy Janowicz	(France) Michaël Llodra (France) Édouard Roger-Vasselin	7–5, 4–6, [10–2]
2011	(Sweden) Johan Brunström (United Kingdom) Ken Skupski	(France) Kenny de Schepper (France) Édouard Roger-Vasselin	7–6^{(7–4)}, 6–3
2010	(Slovakia) Filip Polášek (Slovakia) Igor Zelenay	(Belgium) Ruben Bemelmans (Belgium) Yannick Mertens	3–6, 6–4, [10–5]
2009	(Uzbekistan) Denis Istomin (Russia) Evgeny Korolev	(Colombia) Alejandro Falla (Russia) Teymuraz Gabashvili	6–7(4), 7–6(4), [11–9]
2008	(Slovakia) Michal Mertiňák (Croatia) Lovro Zovko	(Switzerland) Yves Allegro (Romania) Horia Tecău	7–5, 6–3
2007	(Poland) Tomasz Bednarek (Slovakia) Filip Polášek	(Germany) Philipp Petzschner (Austria) Alexander Peya	6–2, 5–7, 10–8
2006	(Switzerland) Jean-Claude Scherrer (Croatia) Lovro Zovko	(Australia) Jordan Kerr (Czech Republic) David Škoch	6–2, 6–4
2005	(Germany) Christopher Kas (Germany) Philipp Petzschner	(Czech Republic) Tomáš Cibulec (Belgium) Tom Vanhoudt	7–6(4), 6–2
