= Steve Darcis =

Belgian professional tennis player

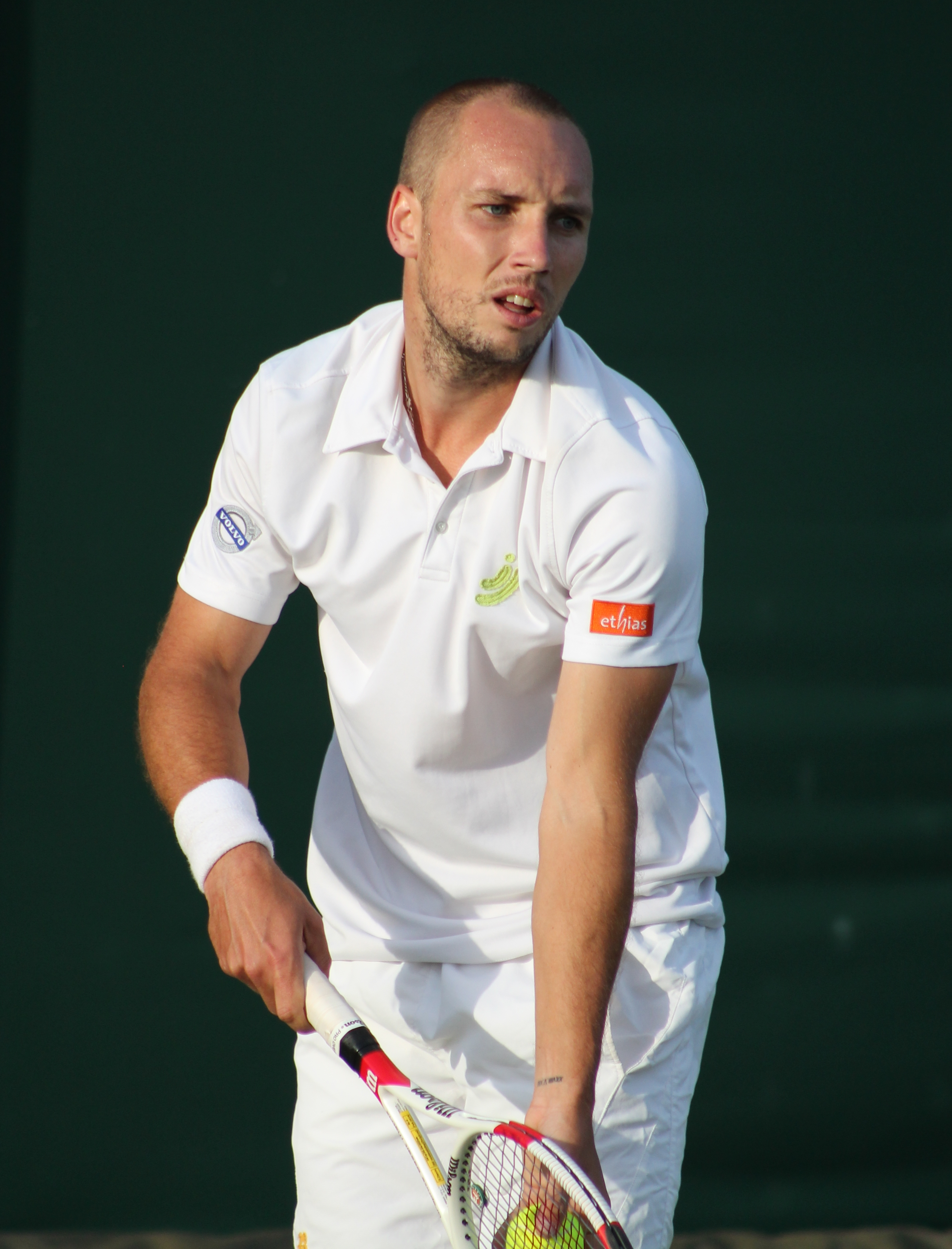
- Country (sports): Belgium
- Residence: Saive, Belgium
- Born: 13 March 1984 (age 42) Liège, Belgium
- Height: 1.77 m (5 ft 10 in)
- Turned pro: 2003
- Retired: 2020
- Plays: Right-handed (one-handed backhand)
- Prize money: $3,445,786

Singles
- Career record: 118–134
- Career titles: 2
- Highest ranking: No. 38 (22 May 2017)

Grand Slam singles results
- Australian Open: 3R (2017)
- French Open: 3R (2011)
- Wimbledon: 2R (2009, 2013, 2017, 2019)
- US Open: 2R (2008, 2011, 2012, 2015, 2016)

Other tournaments
- Olympic Games: 3R (2012)

Doubles
- Career record: 24–45
- Career titles: 0
- Highest ranking: No. 126 (5 January 2009)

Grand Slam doubles results
- Australian Open: 2R (2010)
- French Open: QF (2008)
- Wimbledon: 3R (2012)
- US Open: 3R (2017)

Team competitions
- Davis Cup: F (2015, 2017)
- Last updated on: 22 March 2020.

Steve Darcis (French pronunciation: [stiv daʁsi], born 13 March 1984) is a Belgian tennis coach and former professional player. Darcis won two ATP titles and achieved a career-high singles ranking of world No. 38 on 22 May 2017.

== Personal life ==
Steve Darcis was born in Liège the son of Marie Agnes, a sports instructor, and Alain Darcis, a tennis coach. He has a sister named Céline. Growing up, he looked up at Pete Sampras. On 29 May 2013, his girlfriend Lauranne gave birth to daughter Camille.

== Professional career ==
=== Juniors ===
As a junior, Darcis compiled a singles win–loss record of 73–32, reaching as high as No. 8 in the junior world singles rankings in May 2002 (and No. 15 in doubles). He reached the semifinals at the 2002 Wimbledon Championships boys' singles event.

=== 2007–2009 ===
Darcis won his first ATP World Tour event at the Dutch Open in July 2007 and achieved his first top-100 ranking on 26 November 2007 after winning a Challenger event in Finland.

Darcis competed at the 2008 Australian Open and the French Open, losing in the first round in both. He and Olivier Rochus, however, reached the quarterfinals of the doubles tournament at the French Open. He reached the second round at the US Open. He won a second ATP event at Memphis in March, defeating Robin Söderling in the final. He reached the final of the Dutch Open again, but lost to Albert Montañés.

In 2009, Darcis played in three Grand Slam tournaments, the Australian Open, Wimbledon, and the US Open, reaching the second round only at Wimbledon. He also reached the quarterfinals at Queen's Club.

=== 2010–present ===
Darcis qualified for the 2010 Qatar Open, retiring in his third-round match against Rafael Nadal. He failed to qualify for the Australian Open.

At the 2011 French Open, Darcis advanced to the main draw as a qualifier, and in the first round pulled off a shock victory over 22nd seed Michaël Llodra. Darcis followed this up by beating Philipp Petzschner, to advance into the third round, where he was defeated by Frenchman Gaël Monfils in straight sets.

Darcis made the quarterfinals in Vienna, beating Nikolay Davydenko on the way, but was defeated by Daniel Brands.

In 2012, Darcis made the final of the Dallas Challenger tournament but lost to Jesse Levine. At the Eastbourne International, he defeated Matthew Ebden, Marcos Baghdatis, and Marinko Matosevic to face Andy Roddick in the semifinals. Darcis retired a set down at 1–3 due to a back injury.

At the 2012 Summer Olympics, Darcis beat Tomáš Berdych in the first round.

In the first round at the 2013 Wimbledon Championships on 24 June, Darcis defeated fifth-seeded Rafael Nadal in straight sets. This made him the first player ever to defeat Nadal in the first round of any major tournament. Darcis was ranked 130 places lower than Nadal. At the time, he was the lowest-ranked player ever to beat Nadal in a Grand Slam tournament. It was announced prior to his second-round match that he had withdrawn due to a shoulder injury sustained in the Nadal match.

In the 2017 Australian Open, Darcis defeated Sam Groth and Diego Schwartzman both in four sets to reach the third round, tying his best Grand Slam result to date (in singles). He was taken out by Andreas Seppi despite winning the first set of the match.

In October 2019, Darcis confirmed his plans to retire after the 2020 Australian Open due to elbow pain since the 2019 Wimbledon Championships.

== Coaching career ==
He is currently coaching Belgian players Raphael Collignon and Gauthier Onclin.

== ATP career finals ==
=== Singles: 3 (2 titles, 1 runner-up) ===
| Legend Grand Slam tournaments (0–0) ATP World Tour Finals (0–0) ATP World Tour Masters 1000 (0–0) ATP World Tour 500 Series (1–0) ATP World Tour 250 Series (1–1) | Finals by surface Hard (1–0) Clay (1–1) Grass (0–0) | Finals by setting Outdoor (1–1) Indoor (1–0) |

| Result | W–L | Date | Tournament | Tier | Surface | Opponent | Score |
|---|---|---|---|---|---|---|---|
| Win | 1–0 | Jul 2007 | Dutch Open, Netherlands | 250 Series | Clay | (Austria) Werner Eschauer | 6–1, 7–6^{(7–1)} |
| Win | 2–0 | Mar 2008 | U.S. National Indoor Championships, United States | 500 Series | Hard (i) | (Sweden) Robin Söderling | 6–3, 7–6^{(7–5)} |
| Loss | 2–1 | Jul 2008 | Dutch Open, Netherlands | 250 Series | Clay | (Spain) Albert Montañés | 6–1, 5–7, 3–6 |

== Challenger and Futures finals ==
=== Singles: 39 (19–20) ===
| Legend ATP Challenger Tour (10–13) ITF Futures Tour (9–7) | Finals by surface Hard (5–8) Clay (12–10) Carpet (2–2) |

| Result | W–L | Date | Tournament | Tier | Surface | Opponent | Score |
|---|---|---|---|---|---|---|---|
| Loss | 0–1 | Sep 2003 | Great Britain F10, Glasgow | Futures | Hard (i) | (United Kingdom) Andy Murray | 3–6, 6–3, 3–6 |
| Win | 1–1 | Nov 2003 | Czech Rep. F6, Hrotovice | Futures | Carpet | (Czech Republic) Jan Mašík | 3–6, 6–2, 6–2 |
| Loss | 1–2 | May 2004 | Italy F5, Padova | Futures | Clay | (Spain) José Antonio Sánchez de Luna | 3–6, 7–6^{(8–6)}, 6–7^{(8–10)} |
| Loss | 1–3 | Jul 2004 | Germany F11, Trier | Futures | Clay | (France) Éric Prodon | 3–6, 3–6 |
| Loss | 1–4 | Jan 2005 | Germany F1, Nußloch | Futures | Carpet (i) | (Czech Republic) Robin Vik | 2–6, 3–6 |
| Win | 2–4 | Jan 2005 | France F1, Deauville | Futures | Clay (i) | (France) Olivier Vandewiele | 6–2, 6–1 |
| Win | 3–4 | Jan 2005 | France F2, Feucherolles | Futures | Hard (i) | (France) Jean-Michel Péquery | 6–4, 7–6^{(7–1)} |
| Win | 4–4 | Mar 2005 | France F4, Lille | Futures | Hard (i) | (Switzerland) Roman Valent | 7–5, 6–3 |
| Loss | 4–5 | Oct 2005 | Kolding, Denmark | Challenger | Hard (i) | (Russia) Dmitry Tursunov | 3–6, 4–6 |
| Loss | 4–6 | Nov 2005 | Eckental, Germany | Challenger | Carpet (i) | (Germany) Michael Berrer | 3–6, 6–4, 4–6 |
| Loss | 4–7 | Apr 2006 | France F7, Angers | Futures | Clay (i) | (Switzerland) Stéphane Bohli | 6–7^{(4–7)}, 7–6^{(7–4)}, 3–6 |
| Win | 5–7 | Apr 2007 | France F6, Angers | Futures | Clay (i) | (France) Xavier Pujo | 3–6, 6–4, 6–4 |
| Win | 6–7 | Apr 2007 | Turkey F3, Belek | Futures | Clay | (Czech Republic) Dušan Karol | 6–3, 6–3 |
| Win | 7–7 | Nov 2007 | Helsinki, Finland | Challenger | Hard (i) | (Germany) Tobias Kamke | 6–3, 1–6, 6–4 |
| Loss | 7–8 | Jun 2009 | Prostějov, Czech Republic | Challenger | Clay | (Czech Republic) Jan Hájek | 2–6, 6–1, 4–6 |
| Loss | 7–9 | Mar 2010 | Barletta, Italy | Challenger | Clay | (Spain) Pere Riba | 3–6, 0–0 ret. |
| Win | 8–9 | Aug 2010 | Cordenons, Italy | Challenger | Clay | (Spain) Daniel Muñoz de la Nava | 6–2, 6–4 |
| Loss | 8–10 | Oct 2010 | Mons, Belgium | Challenger | Hard (i) | (France) Adrian Mannarino | 5–7, 2–6 |
| Win | 9–10 | Jul 2011 | Scheveningen, Netherlands | Challenger | Clay | (Turkey) Marsel İlhan | 6–3, 4–6, 6–2 |
| Win | 10–10 | Aug 2011 | Trani, Italy | Challenger | Clay | (Argentina) Leonardo Mayer | 4–6, 6–3, 6–2 |
| Loss | 10–11 | Feb 2012 | Dallas, United States | Challenger | Hard (i) | (United States) Jesse Levine | 4–6, 4–6 |
| Loss | 10–12 | May 2013 | Ostrava, Czech Republic | Challenger | Clay | (Czech Republic) Jiří Veselý | 4–6, 4–6 |
| Win | 11–12 | Aug 2013 | Netherlands F5, Enschede | Futures | Clay | (Netherlands) Thomas Schoorel | 7–6^{(7–2)}, 6–1 |
| Loss | 11–13 | Jun 2014 | Belgium F1, Damme | Futures | Clay | (Belgium) Joris De Loore | 5–7, 3–6 |
| Loss | 11–14 | Jul 2014 | Belgium F7, Middelkerke | Futures | Clay | (Belgium) Niels Desein | 3–6, 6–3, 6–7^{(6–8)} |
| Win | 12–14 | Aug 2014 | Belgium F10, Eupen | Futures | Clay | (Germany) Richard Becker | 7–6^{(7–5)}, 6–1 |
| Win | 13–14 | Sep 2014 | Belgium F14, Arlon | Futures | Clay | (Netherlands) Scott Griekspoor | 6–2, 6–2 |
| Loss | 13–15 | Oct 2014 | Mons, Belgium | Challenger | Hard (i) | (Belgium) David Goffin | 3–6, 3–6 |
| Win | 14–15 | Oct 2014 | Rennes, France | Challenger | Hard (i) | (France) Nicolas Mahut | 6–2, 6–4 |
| Win | 15–15 | Jan 2015 | Nouméa, New Caledonia | Challenger | Hard | (Spain) Adrián Menéndez Maceiras | 6–3, 6–2 |
| Win | 16–15 | Jun 2016 | Lyon, France | Challenger | Clay | (Brazil) Thiago Monteiro | 3–6, 6–2, 6–0 |
| Loss | 16–16 | Jun 2016 | Blois, France | Challenger | Clay | (Argentina) Carlos Berlocq | 2–6, 0–6 |
| Loss | 16–17 | Aug 2016 | Liberec, Czech Republic | Challenger | Clay | (Belgium) Arthur De Greef | 6–7^{(4–7)}, 3–6 |
| Win | 17–17 | Aug 2016 | Trnava, Slovakia | Challenger | Clay | (Spain) Jordi Samper Montaña | 6–3, 6–4 |
| Loss | 17–18 | Oct 2016 | Budapest, Hungary | Challenger | Hard (i) | (Romania) Marius Copil | 4–6, 2–6 |
| Win | 18–18 | Nov 2016 | Eckental, Germany | Challenger | Carpet (i) | (Australia) Alex de Minaur | 6–4, 6–2 |
| Win | 19–18 | May 2017 | Bordeaux, France | Challenger | Clay | (Brazil) Rogério Dutra Silva | 7–6^{(7–2)}, 4–6, 7–5 |
| Loss | 19–19 | Feb 2019 | Cherbourg, France | Challenger | Hard (i) | (France) Ugo Humbert | 7–6^{(8–6)}, 3–6, 3–6 |
| Loss | 19–20 | Nov 2019 | Eckental, Germany | Challenger | Hard (i) | (Czech Republic) Jiří Veselý | 4–6, 6–4, 3–6 |

=== Doubles: 10 (6–4) ===
| Legend ATP Challenger Tour (3–2) ITF Futures Tour (3–2) | Finals by surface Hard (1–0) Clay (5–4) |

| Result | W–L | Date | Tournament | Tier | Surface | Partner | Opponents | Score |
|---|---|---|---|---|---|---|---|---|
| Win | 1–0 | Nov 2003 | Czech Rep. F5, Frýdlant nad Ostravicí | Futures | Hard | (Netherlands) Bart de Gier | (Italy) Flavio Cipolla (Italy) Alessandro da Col | 7–6^{(7–5)}, 6–7^{(4–7)}, 6–3 |
| Loss | 1–1 | Jun 2004 | France F8, Blois | Futures | Clay | (Belgium) Stefan Wauters | (Argentina) Brian Dabul (Argentina) Diego Hartfield | 5–7, 4–6 |
| Win | 2–1 | Jan 2005 | France F1, Deauville | Futures | Clay (i) | (Belgium) Stefan Wauters | (Netherlands) Steven Korteling (Netherlands) Nick van der Meer | 6–4, 6–4 |
| Win | 3–1 | Jul 2005 | Montauban, France | Challenger | Clay | (Belgium) Stefan Wauters | (Spain) Gabriel Trujillo Soler (Croatia) Lovro Zovko | 6–4, 6–7^{(5–7)}, 6–4 |
| Loss | 3–2 | Jul 2005 | Scheveningen, Netherlands | Challenger | Clay | (Belgium) Kristof Vliegen | (France) Julien Benneteau (France) Édouard Roger-Vasselin | 7–5, 5–7, 6–7^{(5–7)} |
| Win | 4–2 | Apr 2007 | Turkey F2, Manavgat | Futures | Clay | (Netherlands) Fred Hemmes | (United States) Brett Ross (Iceland) Arnar Sigurdsson | 6–2, 6–4 |
| Loss | 4–3 | Apr 2007 | Turkey F3, Belek | Futures | Clay | (Netherlands) Fred Hemmes | (Czech Republic) Dušan Karol (Belgium) Jeroen Masson | 3–6, 6–7^{(1–7)} |
| Loss | 4–4 | May 2007 | San Remo, Italy | Challenger | Clay | (Belgium) Stefan Wauters | (Thailand) Sanchai Ratiwatana (Thailand) Sonchat Ratiwatana | 6–7^{(3–7)}, 3–6 |
| Win | 5–4 | Feb 2010 | Tanger, Morocco | Challenger | Clay | (Germany) Dominik Meffert | (Belarus) Uladzimir Ignatik (Slovakia) Martin Kližan | 5–7, 7–5, [10–7] |
| Win | 6–4 | May 2013 | Ostrava, Czech Republic | Challenger | Clay | (Belgium) Olivier Rochus | (Poland) Tomasz Bednarek (Poland) Mateusz Kowalczyk | 7–5, 7–5 |

== Performance timelines ==
Key
| W | F | SF | QF | #R | RR | Q# | P# | DNQ | A | Z# | PO | G | S | B | NMS | NTI | P | NH |

(W) winner; (F) finalist; (SF) semifinalist; (QF) quarterfinalist; (#R) rounds 4, 3, 2, 1; (RR) round-robin stage; (Q#) qualification round; (P#) preliminary round; (DNQ) did not qualify; (A) absent; (Z#) Davis/Fed Cup Zonal Group (with number indication) or (PO) play-off; (G) gold, (S) silver or (B) bronze Olympic/Paralympic medal; (NMS) not a Masters tournament; (NTI) not a Tier I tournament; (P) postponed; (NH) not held; (SR) strike rate (events won / competed); (W–L) win–loss record.

=== Singles ===
Current through the 2019 Swiss Open Gstaad.

| Tournament | 2003 | 2004 | 2005 | 2006 | 2007 | 2008 | 2009 | 2010 | 2011 | 2012 | 2013 | 2014 | 2015 | 2016 | 2017 | 2018 | 2019 | 2020 | SR | W–L |
|---|---|---|---|---|---|---|---|---|---|---|---|---|---|---|---|---|---|---|---|---|
Grand Slam tournaments
| Australian Open | A | A | A | Q2 | A | 1R | 1R | Q3 | A | 1R | 1R | A | Q3 | 1R | 3R | A | 1R | Q1 | 0 / 7 | 2–8 |
| French Open | A | A | Q1 | Q3 | A | 1R | 1R | 2R | 3R | 1R | 1R | A | 1R | 2R | 1R | A | Q3 | A | 0 / 9 | 4–9 |
| Wimbledon | A | A | Q2 | A | A | 1R | 2R | A | Q2 | 1R | 2R* | Q2 | 1R | A | 2R | A | 2R | NH | 0 / 7 | 4–6 |
| US Open | A | A | A | Q1 | 1R | 2R | 1R | A | 2R | 2R | A | 1R | 2R | 2R | 1R | A | 1R | A | 0 / 10 | 5–10 |
| Win–loss | 0–0 | 0–0 | 0–0 | 0–0 | 0–1 | 1–4 | 1–4 | 1–1 | 3–2 | 1–4 | 1–2 | 0–1 | 1–3 | 2–3 | 3–4 | 0–0 | 1–3 | 0–0 | 0 / 33 | 15–33 |
National representation
| Summer Olympics | NH | Not Held | | | NH | 1R | Not Held | | | 3R | Not Held | | | A | Not Held | | | | 0 / 2 | 2–2 |
| Davis Cup | A | A | PO | A | A | 1R | PO | 1R | 1R | PO | 1R | PO | F | PO | F | A | GS | A | 0 / 6 | 23–12 |
| Win–loss | 0–0 | 0–0 | 0–1 | 0–0 | 0–0 | 1–4 | 2–0 | 2–0 | 2–0 | 5–1 | 3–0 | 0–2 | 4–2 | 1–0 | 4–3 | 0–0 | 1–1 | 0–0 | 0 / 7 | 25–14 |
ATP World Tour Masters 1000
| Indian Wells Masters | A | A | A | A | A | A | 2R | A | A | 2R | Q1 | A | A | A | A | A | A | NH | 0 / 2 | 2–2 |
| Miami Open | A | A | A | A | A | Q1 | 1R | A | A | 1R | Q1 | A | 3R | A | A | A | A | NH | 0 / 3 | 2–3 |
| Monte-Carlo Masters | A | A | A | A | A | A | Q2 | A | A | Q2 | Q1 | A | A | A | 1R | A | A | NH | 0 / 1 | 0–1 |
| Madrid Open | A | A | A | A | A | 1R | A | A | A | A | A | A | A | A | A | A | A | NH | 0 / 1 | 0–1 |
| Italian Open | A | A | A | A | A | 2R | A | A | A | A | A | A | A | A | A | A | A | NH | 0 / 1 | 1–1 |
| Canadian Open | A | A | A | A | A | A | A | A | A | A | A | A | A | A | A | A | A | A | 0 / 0 | 0–0 |
| Cincinnati Masters | A | A | A | A | A | A | A | A | A | Q1 | A | A | A | A | A | A | A | A | 0 / 0 | 0–0 |
| Shanghai Masters | NMS | | | | | | A | A | A | A | A | A | A | A | A | A | A | A | 0 / 0 | 0–0 |
| Paris Masters | A | A | A | A | A | A | A | A | A | Q1 | A | A | A | A | A | A | A | A | 0 / 0 | 0–0 |
| German Open | A | A | A | A | A | 1R | Not Masters Series | | | | | | | | | | | | 0 / 1 | 0–1 |
| Win–loss | 0–0 | 0–0 | 0–0 | 0–0 | 0–0 | 1–3 | 1–2 | 0–0 | 0–0 | 1–2 | 0–0 | 0–0 | 2–1 | 0–0 | 0–1 | 0–0 | 0–0 | 0–0 | 0 / 9 | 5–9 |
Career statistics
| | 2003 | 2004 | 2005 | 2006 | 2007 | 2008 | 2009 | 2010 | 2011 | 2012 | 2013 | 2014 | 2015 | 2016 | 2017 | 2018 | 2019 | 2020 | Career | |
| Tournaments | 0 | 0 | 0 | 1 | 3 | 21 | 18 | 6 | 6 | 18 | 7 | 1 | 11 | 5 | 18 | 0 | 12 | 2 | 128 | |
| Titles / Finals | 0 / 0 | 0 / 0 | 0 / 0 | 0 / 0 | 1 / 1 | 1 / 2 | 0 / 0 | 0 / 0 | 0 / 0 | 0 / 0 | 0 / 0 | 0 / 0 | 0 / 0 | 0 / 0 | 0 / 0 | 0 / 0 | 0 / 0 | 0 / 0 | 2 / 3 | |
| Overall win–loss | 0–0 | 0–0 | 0–1 | 0–1 | 6–2 | 21–23 | 6–18 | 6–6 | 9–6 | 22–17 | 5–6 | 0–3 | 12–13 | 4–5 | 20–20 | 0–0 | 5–12 | 2–2 | 119–136 | |
| Year-end ranking | 482 | 368 | 153 | 483 | 86 | 61 | 122 | 109 | 88 | 93 | 164 | 160 | 86 | 86 | 77 | n/a | 157 | n/a | 46.67% | |

* Darcis withdrew before the second round match at the 2013 Wimbledon.

=== Doubles ===
| Tournament | 2008 | 2009 | 2010 | 2011 | 2012 | 2013 | 2014 | 2015 | 2016 | 2017 | 2018 | 2019 | SR | W–L |
|---|---|---|---|---|---|---|---|---|---|---|---|---|---|---|
Grand Slam tournaments
| Australian Open | 1R | 1R | 2R | A | A | A | A | A | A | A | A | A | 0 / 3 | 1–3 |
| French Open | QF | A | A | A | 1R | A | A | 1R | A | 1R | A | A | 0 / 4 | 3–4 |
| Wimbledon | 1R | A | A | A | 3R | A | A | A | A | A | A | A | 0 / 2 | 2–2 |
| US Open | 1R | A | A | A | 1R | A | A | 1R | A | 3R | A | A | 0 / 4 | 2–4 |
| Win–loss | 3–4 | 0–1 | 1–1 | 0–0 | 2–3 | 0–0 | 0–0 | 0–2 | 0–0 | 2–2 | 0–0 | 0–0 | 0 / 13 | 8–13 |

== Wins over top-10 opponents ==
| No. | Opponent | Rank | Event | Surface | Round | Score | SDR |
|---|---|---|---|---|---|---|---|
2012
| 1. | (Czech Republic) Tomáš Berdych | 7 | Olympics, United Kingdom | Grass | 1R | 6–4, 6–4 | 75 |
2013
| 2. | (Spain) Rafael Nadal | 5 | Wimbledon, United Kingdom | Grass | 1R | 7–6^{(7–4)}, 7–6^{(10–8)}, 6–4 | 135 |
2017
| 3. | (Spain) Pablo Carreño Busta | 10 | China Open, China | Hard | 1R | 6–0, 6–4 | 73 |
