= 2011 ATP Challenger Tour =

Tennis tournament

Details
- Duration: 3 January 2011 – 27 November 2011
- Edition: 34th (3rd under this name)
- Tournaments: 149

Achievements (singles)

The ATP Challenger Tour was the secondary professional tennis circuit organized by the Association of Tennis Professionals (ATP). The 2011 ATP Challenger Tour calendar comprised 15 top tier Tretorn SERIE+ tournaments, and approximately 150 regular series tournaments, with prize money ranging from $35,000 up to $150,000.

== Schedule ==
This is the schedule of events, with player progression documented from the quarterfinals stage.

Key

ATP Challenger Tour Finals
Tretorn SERIE+ tournaments
Regular

=== January ===
Week of	Tournament	Champions	Runners-up	Semifinalists	Quarterfinalists
January 3	2011 Prime Cup Aberto de São Paulo; São Paulo, Brazil; Regular series Hard – $100,000+H – 32S/32Q/16D; Singles – Doubles	(Brazil) Ricardo Mello; 6–2, 6–1	(Brazil) Rafael Camilo	(Argentina) Federico Delbonis (Spain) Adrián Menéndez	(Argentina) Juan Pablo Brzezicki (Brazil) João Souza (Belarus) Uladzimir Ignatik (Italy) Thomas Fabbiano
January 3	2011 Prime Cup Aberto de São Paulo; São Paulo, Brazil; Regular series Hard – $100,000+H – 32S/32Q/16D; Singles – Doubles	(Brazil) Franco Ferreiro (Brazil) André Sá; 7–5, 7–6(12)	(Mexico) Santiago González (Argentina) Horacio Zeballos	(Argentina) Federico Delbonis (Spain) Adrián Menéndez	(Argentina) Juan Pablo Brzezicki (Brazil) João Souza (Belarus) Uladzimir Ignatik (Italy) Thomas Fabbiano
January 3	2011 Internationaux de Nouvelle-Calédonie; Nouméa, New Caledonia, France; Regular series Hard – $75,000+H – 32S/10Q/16D; Singles – Doubles	(France) Vincent Millot; 7–6(6), 2–6, 6–4	(Luxembourg) Gilles Müller	(France) Augustin Gensse (Netherlands) Jesse Huta Galung	(Slovakia) Pavol Červenák (Italy) Flavio Cipolla (France) Josselin Ouanna (France) Grégoire Burquier
January 3	2011 Internationaux de Nouvelle-Calédonie; Nouméa, New Caledonia, France; Regular series Hard – $75,000+H – 32S/10Q/16D; Singles – Doubles	(Germany) Dominik Meffert (Denmark) Frederik Nielsen; 7–6(4), 5–7, [10–5]	(Italy) Flavio Cipolla (Italy) Simone Vagnozzi	(France) Augustin Gensse (Netherlands) Jesse Huta Galung	(Slovakia) Pavol Červenák (Italy) Flavio Cipolla (France) Josselin Ouanna (France) Grégoire Burquier
January 10	No tournaments scheduled.				
January 17	No tournaments scheduled.				
January 24	2011 Intersport Heilbronn Open; Heilbronn, Germany; Regular series Hard (i) – €85,000+H – 32S/32Q/16D; Singles – Doubles	(Germany) Bastian Knittel; 7–6(4), 7–6(5)	(Germany) Daniel Brands	(Serbia) Ilija Bozoljac (Netherlands) Jesse Huta Galung	(Germany) Dominik Meffert (Republic of Ireland) Conor Niland (Germany) Matthias Bachinger (Germany) Michael Berrer
January 24	2011 Intersport Heilbronn Open; Heilbronn, Germany; Regular series Hard (i) – €85,000+H – 32S/32Q/16D; Singles – Doubles	(United Kingdom) Jamie Delgado (United Kingdom) Jonathan Marray; 6–1, 6–4	(Germany) Frank Moser (Czech Republic) David Škoch	(Serbia) Ilija Bozoljac (Netherlands) Jesse Huta Galung	(Germany) Dominik Meffert (Republic of Ireland) Conor Niland (Germany) Matthias Bachinger (Germany) Michael Berrer
January 24	2011 Singapore ATP Challenger; Singapore; Regular series Hard – €50,000+H – 32S/32Q/16D; Singles – Doubles	(Russia) Dmitry Tursunov; 6–4, 6–2	(Czech Republic) Lukáš Rosol	(Slovakia) Andrej Martin (Japan) Go Soeda	(India) Somdev Devvarman (Italy) Flavio Cipolla (United States) Michael Yani (Japan) Tatsuma Ito
January 24	2011 Singapore ATP Challenger; Singapore; Regular series Hard – €50,000+H – 32S/32Q/16D; Singles – Doubles	(United States) Scott Lipsky (United States) David Martin; 5–7, 6–1, [10–8]	(Thailand) Sanchai Ratiwatana (Thailand) Sonchat Ratiwatana	(Slovakia) Andrej Martin (Japan) Go Soeda	(India) Somdev Devvarman (Italy) Flavio Cipolla (United States) Michael Yani (Japan) Tatsuma Ito
January 24	2011 Honolulu Challenger; Honolulu, United States; Regular series Hard – $50,000 – 32S/30Q/16D; Singles – Doubles	(United States) Ryan Harrison; 6–4, 3–6, 6–4	(United States) Alex Kuznetsov	(United States) Michael Russell (United States) Jesse Witten	(Canada) Vasek Pospisil (United States) Ryan Sweeting (United States) Bobby Reynolds (United States) Robert Kendrick
January 24	2011 Honolulu Challenger; Honolulu, United States; Regular series Hard – $50,000 – 32S/30Q/16D; Singles – Doubles	(United States) Ryan Harrison (United States) Travis Rettenmaier walkover	(United States) Robert Kendrick (United States) Alex Kuznetsov	(United States) Michael Russell (United States) Jesse Witten	(Canada) Vasek Pospisil (United States) Ryan Sweeting (United States) Bobby Reynolds (United States) Robert Kendrick
January 24	2011 Seguros Bolívar Open Bucaramanga; Bucaramanga, Colombia; Regular series Clay (red) – $35,000+H – 32S/18Q/16D; Singles – Doubles	(France) Éric Prodon; 6–3, 4–6, 6–1	(Brazil) Fernando Romboli	(Argentina) José Acasuso (Morocco) Reda El Amrani	(Ecuador) Giovanni Lapentti (Portugal) Gastão Elias (Brazil) João Souza (Argentina) Andrés Molteni
January 24	2011 Seguros Bolívar Open Bucaramanga; Bucaramanga, Colombia; Regular series Clay (red) – $35,000+H – 32S/18Q/16D; Singles – Doubles	(Colombia) Juan Sebastián Cabal (Colombia) Robert Farah; 6–1, 6–2	(Argentina) Pablo Galdón (Argentina) Andrés Molteni	(Argentina) José Acasuso (Morocco) Reda El Amrani	(Ecuador) Giovanni Lapentti (Portugal) Gastão Elias (Brazil) João Souza (Argentina) Andrés Molteni
January 24	2011 Open de la Réunion; Réunion; Regular series Hard – $30,000+H – 32S/18Q/16D; Singles – Doubles	All quarterfinal (singles) and semifinal (doubles) matches were cancelled by the supervisor, due to heavy rain and flooding.			(France) Florent Serra (France) Augustin Gensse (France) Stéphane Robert (Switzerland) Alexander Sadecky (France) Mathieu Rodrigues (France) Nicolas Renavand (Kazakhstan) Yuri Schukin (Poland) Michał Przysiężny
January 31	2011 Kazan Kremlin Cup; Kazan, Russia; Tretorn SERIE+ Hard (i) – $75,000 – 32S/30Q/16D; Singles – Doubles	(Romania) Marius Copil; 6–4, 6–4	(Germany) Andreas Beck	(Germany) Dominik Meffert (Russia) Evgeny Kirillov	(Russia) Ilya Belyaev (Germany) Simon Stadler (Estonia) Jürgen Zopp (Ukraine) Sergei Bubka
January 31	2011 Kazan Kremlin Cup; Kazan, Russia; Tretorn SERIE+ Hard (i) – $75,000 – 32S/30Q/16D; Singles – Doubles	(Switzerland) Yves Allegro (Germany) Andreas Beck; 6–4, 6–4	(Russia) Mikhail Elgin (Russia) Alexander Kudryavtsev	(Germany) Dominik Meffert (Russia) Evgeny Kirillov	(Russia) Ilya Belyaev (Germany) Simon Stadler (Estonia) Jürgen Zopp (Ukraine) Sergei Bubka
January 31	2011 McDonald's Burnie International; Burnie, Australia; Regular series Hard – $50,000 – 32S/25Q/16D; Singles – Doubles	(Italy) Flavio Cipolla walkover	(Australia) Chris Guccione	(Japan) Tatsuma Ito (Australia) Bernard Tomic	(Slovakia) Pavol Červenák (United Kingdom) James Ward (Australia) Benjamin Mitchell (Italy) Paolo Lorenzi
January 31	2011 McDonald's Burnie International; Burnie, Australia; Regular series Hard – $50,000 – 32S/25Q/16D; Singles – Doubles	(Canada) Philip Bester (Canada) Peter Polansky; 6–3, 4–6, [14–12]	(Australia) Marinko Matosevic (New Zealand) Rubin Jose Statham	(Japan) Tatsuma Ito (Australia) Bernard Tomic	(Slovakia) Pavol Červenák (United Kingdom) James Ward (Australia) Benjamin Mitchell (Italy) Paolo Lorenzi
January 31	2011 Valle d'Aosta Open; Courmayeur, Italy; Regular series Hard (i) – $30,000+H – 32S/30Q/16D; Singles – Doubles	(France) Nicolas Mahut; 7–6(4), 6–4	(Luxembourg) Gilles Müller	(Germany) Matthias Bachinger (Poland) Jerzy Janowicz	(Lithuania) Laurynas Grigelis (Belgium) Ruben Bemelmans (Slovakia) Martin Kližan (Belgium) Olivier Rochus
January 31	2011 Valle d'Aosta Open; Courmayeur, Italy; Regular series Hard (i) – $30,000+H – 32S/30Q/16D; Singles – Doubles	(France) Marc Gicquel (France) Nicolas Mahut; 6–3, 6–4	(France) Olivier Charroin (France) Alexandre Renard	(Germany) Matthias Bachinger (Poland) Jerzy Janowicz	(Lithuania) Laurynas Grigelis (Belgium) Ruben Bemelmans (Slovakia) Martin Kližan (Belgium) Olivier Rochus

=== February ===
Week of	Tournament	Champions	Runners-up	Semifinalists	Quarterfinalists
February 7	2011 Caloundra International; Caloundra, Australia; Regular series Hard – $50,000+H – 32S/32Q/16D; Singles – Doubles	(Slovenia) Grega Žemlja; 7–6(4), 6–3	(Australia) Bernard Tomic	(Thailand) Danai Udomchoke (Australia) Matthew Ebden	(Australia) Marinko Matosevic (Australia) Carsten Ball (Slovakia) Ivo Klec (Italy) Flavio Cipolla
February 7	2011 Caloundra International; Caloundra, Australia; Regular series Hard – $50,000+H – 32S/32Q/16D; Singles – Doubles	(Australia) Matthew Ebden (Australia) Samuel Groth; 6–3, 3–6, [10–1]	(Slovakia) Pavol Červenák (Slovakia) Ivo Klec	(Thailand) Danai Udomchoke (Australia) Matthew Ebden	(Australia) Marinko Matosevic (Australia) Carsten Ball (Slovakia) Ivo Klec (Italy) Flavio Cipolla
February 7	2011 Internazionali Trismoka; Bergamo, Italy; Regular series Hard (i) – $42,500+H – 32S/32Q/16D; Singles – Doubles	(Italy) Andreas Seppi; 3–6, 6–3, 6–4	(Luxembourg) Gilles Müller	(Russia) Alexander Kudryavtsev (Estonia) Jürgen Zopp	(Belarus) Uladzimir Ignatik (Germany) Dieter Kindlmann (France) Stéphane Robert (Belgium) Olivier Rochus
February 7	2011 Internazionali Trismoka; Bergamo, Italy; Regular series Hard (i) – $42,500+H – 32S/32Q/16D; Singles – Doubles	(Denmark) Frederik Nielsen (United Kingdom) Ken Skupski walkover	(Russia) Mikhail Elgin (Russia) Alexander Kudryavtsev	(Russia) Alexander Kudryavtsev (Estonia) Jürgen Zopp	(Belarus) Uladzimir Ignatik (Germany) Dieter Kindlmann (France) Stéphane Robert (Belgium) Olivier Rochus
February 7	2011 Open EuroEnergie de Quimper; Quimper, France; Regular series Hard (i) – $30,000+H – 32S/32Q/16D; Singles – Doubles	(France) David Guez; 6–2, 4–6, 7–6(5)	(France) Kenny de Schepper	(Spain) Roberto Bautista Agut (France) Olivier Patience	(France) Mathieu Rodrigues (France) Laurent Rochette (France) Vincent Millot (France) Marc Gicquel
February 7	2011 Open EuroEnergie de Quimper; Quimper, France; Regular series Hard (i) – $30,000+H – 32S/32Q/16D; Singles – Doubles	(United States) James Cerretani (Canada) Adil Shamasdin; 6–3, 5–7, [10–5]	(United Kingdom) Jamie Delgado (United Kingdom) Jonathan Marray	(Spain) Roberto Bautista Agut (France) Olivier Patience	(France) Mathieu Rodrigues (France) Laurent Rochette (France) Vincent Millot (France) Marc Gicquel
February 14	2011 Morocco Tennis Tour – Meknes; Meknes, Morocco; Regular series Clay – $30,000+H – 32S/32Q/16D; Singles – Doubles	(Czech Republic) Jaroslav Pospíšil; 6–1, 3–6, 6–3	(Spain) Guillermo Olaso	(Germany) Bastian Knittel (Germany) Simon Greul	(Romania) Victor Crivoi (Spain) Guillermo Alcaide (Italy) Alessio di Mauro (Slovakia) Ivo Klec
February 14	2011 Morocco Tennis Tour – Meknes; Meknes, Morocco; Regular series Clay – $30,000+H – 32S/32Q/16D; Singles – Doubles	(Philippines) Treat Conrad Huey (Italy) Simone Vagnozzi; 6–1, 6–2	(Italy) Alessio di Mauro (Italy) Alessandro Motti	(Germany) Bastian Knittel (Germany) Simon Greul	(Romania) Victor Crivoi (Spain) Guillermo Alcaide (Italy) Alessio di Mauro (Slovakia) Ivo Klec
February 21	2011 Morocco Tennis Tour – Casablanca; Casablanca, Morocco; Regular series Clay – $30,000+H – 32S/32Q/16D; Singles – Doubles	(Russia) Evgeny Donskoy; 2–6, 6–3, 6–3	(Italy) Alessio di Mauro	(Czech Republic) Jaroslav Pospíšil (Croatia) Franko Škugor	(Spain) Adrián Menéndez (Italy) Matteo Viola (Russia) Andrey Kuznetsov (Germany) Simon Greul
February 21	2011 Morocco Tennis Tour – Casablanca; Casablanca, Morocco; Regular series Clay – $30,000+H – 32S/32Q/16D; Singles – Doubles	(Spain) Guillermo Alcaide (Spain) Adrián Menéndez; 6–2, 6–1	(Portugal) Leonardo Tavares (Italy) Simone Vagnozzi	(Czech Republic) Jaroslav Pospíšil (Croatia) Franko Škugor	(Spain) Adrián Menéndez (Italy) Matteo Viola (Russia) Andrey Kuznetsov (Germany) Simon Greul
February 21	2011 Volkswagen Challenger; Wolfsburg, Germany; Regular series $30,000+H – Synthetic (i) – 32S/32Q/16D; Singles – Doubles	(Belgium) Ruben Bemelmans; 6–7(8), 6–4, 6–4	(Germany) Dominik Meffert	(Germany) Stefan Seifert (Serbia) Ilija Bozoljac	(Belarus) Uladzimir Ignatik (Germany) Sebastian Rieschick (Germany) Dieter Kindlmann (Germany) Matthias Bachinger
February 21	2011 Volkswagen Challenger; Wolfsburg, Germany; Regular series $30,000+H – Synthetic (i) – 32S/32Q/16D; Singles – Doubles	(Germany) Matthias Bachinger (Germany) Simon Stadler; 3–6, 7–6(3), [10–7]	(Germany) Dominik Meffert (Denmark) Frederik Nielsen	(Germany) Stefan Seifert (Serbia) Ilija Bozoljac	(Belarus) Uladzimir Ignatik (Germany) Sebastian Rieschick (Germany) Dieter Kindlmann (Germany) Matthias Bachinger
February 28	2011 Challenger of Dallas; Dallas, USA; Regular series Hard (i) – $50,000+H– 32S/32Q/16D; Singles – Doubles	(United States) Alex Bogomolov Jr. 7–6(5), 6–3	(Germany) Rainer Schüttler	(United States) Alex Kuznetsov (Australia) Matthew Ebden	(United States) Ryan Harrison (Australia) Marinko Matosevic (United States) Jack Sock (Australia) Greg Jones
February 28	2011 Challenger of Dallas; Dallas, USA; Regular series Hard (i) – $50,000+H– 32S/32Q/16D; Singles – Doubles	(United States) Scott Lipsky (United States) Rajeev Ram; 7–6(3), 6–4	(Germany) Dustin Brown (Germany) Björn Phau	(United States) Alex Kuznetsov (Australia) Matthew Ebden	(United States) Ryan Harrison (Australia) Marinko Matosevic (United States) Jack Sock (Australia) Greg Jones
February 28	2011 Challenger DCNS de Cherbourg; Cherbourg, France; Regular series Hard (i) – $42,500+H– 32S/32Q/16D; Singles – Doubles	(Bulgaria) Grigor Dimitrov; 6–2, 7–6(4)	(France) Nicolas Mahut	(France) Stéphane Robert (Slovakia) Karol Beck	(Switzerland) Stéphane Bohli (Australia) John Millman (Slovakia) Marek Semjan (Spain) Roberto Bautista Agut
February 28	2011 Challenger DCNS de Cherbourg; Cherbourg, France; Regular series Hard (i) – $42,500+H– 32S/32Q/16D; Singles – Doubles	(France) Pierre-Hugues Herbert (France) Nicolas Renavand; 3–6, 6–4 [10–5]	(France) Nicolas Mahut (France) Édouard Roger-Vasselin	(France) Stéphane Robert (Slovakia) Karol Beck	(Switzerland) Stéphane Bohli (Australia) John Millman (Slovakia) Marek Semjan (Spain) Roberto Bautista Agut
February 28	2011 Challenger ATP de Salinas Diario Expreso; Salinas, Ecuador; Regular series Hard – $35,000+H – 32S/32Q/16D; Singles – Doubles	(Argentina) Andrés Molteni; 7–5, 7–6(4)	(Argentina) Horacio Zeballos	(Brazil) Rogério Dutra da Silva (Argentina) Diego Junqueira	(Argentina) Federico Delbonis (Argentina) Juan Pablo Brzezicki (Argentina) Facundo Bagnis (Croatia) Franko Škugor
February 28	2011 Challenger ATP de Salinas Diario Expreso; Salinas, Ecuador; Regular series Hard – $35,000+H – 32S/32Q/16D; Singles – Doubles	(Argentina) Facundo Bagnis (Argentina) Federico Delbonis; 6–2, 6–1	(Brazil) Rogério Dutra da Silva (Brazil) João Souza	(Brazil) Rogério Dutra da Silva (Argentina) Diego Junqueira	(Argentina) Federico Delbonis (Argentina) Juan Pablo Brzezicki (Argentina) Facundo Bagnis (Croatia) Franko Škugor

=== March ===
Week of	Tournament	Champions	Runners-up	Semifinalists	Quarterfinalists
March 7	2011 Cachantún Cup; Santiago, Chile; Regular series Clay (red) – $35,000+H – 32S/32Q/16D; Singles – Doubles	(Argentina) Máximo González; 7–5, 0–6, 6–2	(France) Éric Prodon	(Argentina) Horacio Zeballos (Italy) Riccardo Ghedin	(Chile) Paul Capdeville (Brazil) Rogério Dutra da Silva (Croatia) Franko Škugor (Argentina) Diego Junqueira
March 7	2011 Cachantún Cup; Santiago, Chile; Regular series Clay (red) – $35,000+H – 32S/32Q/16D; Singles – Doubles	(Argentina) Máximo González (Argentina) Horacio Zeballos; 6–3, 6–4	(Chile) Guillermo Rivera Aránguiz (Chile) Cristóbal Saavedra Corvalán	(Argentina) Horacio Zeballos (Italy) Riccardo Ghedin	(Chile) Paul Capdeville (Brazil) Rogério Dutra da Silva (Croatia) Franko Škugor (Argentina) Diego Junqueira
March 7	2011 All Japan Tennis Championships; Kyoto, Japan; Regular series Carpet (i) – $35,000+H – 32S/32Q/16D; Singles – Doubles	(Germany) Dominik Meffert; 4–6, 6–4, 6–2	(Germany) Cedrik-Marcel Stebe	(Japan) Go Soeda (Germany) Simon Stadler	(Germany) Sebastian Rieschick (Germany) Andre Begemann (Japan) Tatsuma Ito (Germany) Matthias Bachinger
March 7	2011 All Japan Tennis Championships; Kyoto, Japan; Regular series Carpet (i) – $35,000+H – 32S/32Q/16D; Singles – Doubles	(Germany) Dominik Meffert (Germany) Simon Stadler; 7–5, 2–6, [10–7]	(Germany) Andre Begemann (Australia) James Lemke	(Japan) Go Soeda (Germany) Simon Stadler	(Germany) Sebastian Rieschick (Germany) Andre Begemann (Japan) Tatsuma Ito (Germany) Matthias Bachinger
March 7	2011 BH Telecom Indoors; Sarajevo, Bosnia and Herzegovina; Regular series Hard (i) – €30,000+H – 32S/32Q/16D; Singles – Doubles	(Bosnia and Herzegovina) Amer Delić walkover	(Slovakia) Karol Beck	(Bosnia and Herzegovina) Mirza Bašić (France) Nicolas Mahut	(France) Édouard Roger-Vasselin (Russia) Dmitry Tursunov (Czech Republic) Jan Hernych (Austria) Martin Fischer
March 7	2011 BH Telecom Indoors; Sarajevo, Bosnia and Herzegovina; Regular series Hard (i) – €30,000+H – 32S/32Q/16D; Singles – Doubles	(United Kingdom) Jamie Delgado (United Kingdom) Jonathan Marray; 7–6(4), 6–2	(Switzerland) Yves Allegro (Germany) Andreas Beck	(Bosnia and Herzegovina) Mirza Bašić (France) Nicolas Mahut	(France) Édouard Roger-Vasselin (Russia) Dmitry Tursunov (Czech Republic) Jan Hernych (Austria) Martin Fischer
March 14	2011 Orange Open Guadeloupe; Le Gosier, Guadeloupe; Regular series Hard – $100,000+H – 32S/32Q/16D; Singles – Doubles	(Belgium) Olivier Rochus; 6–2, 6–3	(France) Stéphane Robert	(Finland) Jarkko Nieminen (Portugal) Gastão Elias	(Portugal) Frederico Gil (Turkey) Marsel İlhan (Czech Republic) Lukáš Rosol (Switzerland) Stéphane Bohli
March 14	2011 Orange Open Guadeloupe; Le Gosier, Guadeloupe; Regular series Hard – $100,000+H – 32S/32Q/16D; Singles – Doubles	(Italy) Riccardo Ghedin (France) Stéphane Robert; 6–2, 5–7, [10–7]	(France) Arnaud Clément (Belgium) Olivier Rochus	(Finland) Jarkko Nieminen (Portugal) Gastão Elias	(Portugal) Frederico Gil (Turkey) Marsel İlhan (Czech Republic) Lukáš Rosol (Switzerland) Stéphane Bohli
March 14	2011 Seguros Bolívar Open San José; San José, Costa Rica; Regular series Hard – $50,000+H – 32S/32Q/16D; Singles – Doubles	(Ecuador) Giovanni Lapentti; 7–5, 6–3	(Russia) Igor Kunitsyn	(Croatia) Franko Škugor (Dominican Republic) Víctor Estrella	(Russia) Teymuraz Gabashvili (Republic of Ireland) Louk Sorensen (Colombia) Juan Sebastián Cabal (United States) Robert Kendrick
March 14	2011 Seguros Bolívar Open San José; San José, Costa Rica; Regular series Hard – $50,000+H – 32S/32Q/16D; Singles – Doubles	(Colombia) Juan Sebastián Cabal (Colombia) Robert Farah; 6–3, 6–3	(Mexico) Luis Díaz Barriga (Mexico) Santiago González	(Croatia) Franko Škugor (Dominican Republic) Víctor Estrella	(Russia) Teymuraz Gabashvili (Republic of Ireland) Louk Sorensen (Colombia) Juan Sebastián Cabal (United States) Robert Kendrick
March 14	2011 Morocco Tennis Tour – Rabat; Rabat, Morocco; Regular series Clay (red) – €42,500+H – 32S/32Q/16D; Singles – Doubles	(Czech Republic) Ivo Minář; 7–5, 6–3	(Australia) Peter Luczak	(Tunisia) Malek Jaziri (Slovakia) Martin Kližan	(Czech Republic) Dušan Lojda (Spain) Pablo Carreño Busta (Argentina) Federico Delbonis (Spain) Guillermo Alcaide
March 14	2011 Morocco Tennis Tour – Rabat; Rabat, Morocco; Regular series Clay (red) – €42,500+H – 32S/32Q/16D; Singles – Doubles	(Italy) Alessio di Mauro (Italy) Simone Vagnozzi; 6–4, 6–4	(Kazakhstan) Evgeny Korolev (Kazakhstan) Yuri Schukin	(Tunisia) Malek Jaziri (Slovakia) Martin Kližan	(Czech Republic) Dušan Lojda (Spain) Pablo Carreño Busta (Argentina) Federico Delbonis (Spain) Guillermo Alcaide
March 14	2011 ATP Challenger Guangzhou; Guangzhou, China; Regular series Hard – $35,000+H – 32S/32Q/16D; Singles – Doubles	(Belarus) Uladzimir Ignatik; 6–4, 6–4	(Russia) Alexander Kudryavtsev	(Germany) Matthias Bachinger (Germany) Cedrik-Marcel Stebe	(Germany) Sebastian Rieschick (Japan) Tatsuma Ito (Belgium) Steve Darcis (Germany) Dominik Meffert
March 14	2011 ATP Challenger Guangzhou; Guangzhou, China; Regular series Hard – $35,000+H – 32S/32Q/16D; Singles – Doubles	(Russia) Mikhail Elgin (Russia) Alexander Kudryavtsev; 7–6(3), 6–3	(Thailand) Sanchai Ratiwatana (Thailand) Sonchat Ratiwatana	(Germany) Matthias Bachinger (Germany) Cedrik-Marcel Stebe	(Germany) Sebastian Rieschick (Japan) Tatsuma Ito (Belgium) Steve Darcis (Germany) Dominik Meffert
March 14	2011 Men's Rimouski Challenger; Rimouski, Canada; Regular series Hard (i) – $35,000+H – 32S/32Q/16D; Singles – Doubles	(South Africa) Fritz Wolmarans; 6–7(2), 6–3, 7–6(3)	(United States) Bobby Reynolds	(Denmark) Frederik Nielsen (Canada) Vasek Pospisil	(Israel) Amir Weintraub (United States) Greg Ouellette (Italy) Matteo Viola (United States) Kevin Kim
March 14	2011 Men's Rimouski Challenger; Rimouski, Canada; Regular series Hard (i) – $35,000+H – 32S/32Q/16D; Singles – Doubles	(Philippines) Treat Conrad Huey (Canada) Vasek Pospisil; 6–0, 6–1	(United Kingdom) David Rice (United Kingdom) Sean Thornley	(Denmark) Frederik Nielsen (Canada) Vasek Pospisil	(Israel) Amir Weintraub (United States) Greg Ouellette (Italy) Matteo Viola (United States) Kevin Kim
March 21	2011 Aegon GB Pro-Series Bath; Bath, Great Britain; Regular series Hard (i) – €42,500+H – 32S/32Q/16D; Singles – Doubles	(Russia) Dmitry Tursunov; 6–4, 6–4	(Germany) Andreas Beck	(Estonia) Jürgen Zopp (United Kingdom) Daniel Evans	(France) Nicolas Mahut (Sweden) Ervin Eleskovic (Slovakia) Andrej Martin (Denmark) Frederik Nielsen
March 21	2011 Aegon GB Pro-Series Bath; Bath, Great Britain; Regular series Hard (i) – €42,500+H – 32S/32Q/16D; Singles – Doubles	(United Kingdom) Jamie Delgado (United Kingdom) Jonathan Marray; 6–3, 6–4	(Switzerland) Yves Allegro (Germany) Andreas Beck	(Estonia) Jürgen Zopp (United Kingdom) Daniel Evans	(France) Nicolas Mahut (Sweden) Ervin Eleskovic (Slovakia) Andrej Martin (Denmark) Frederik Nielsen
March 21	2011 Morocco Tennis Tour – Marrakech; Marrakesh, Morocco; Regular series Clay (red) – €42,500+H – 32S/32Q/16D; Singles – Doubles	(Portugal) Rui Machado; 6–3, 6–7(7), 6–4	(France) Maxime Teixeira	(France) Augustin Gensse (Czech Republic) Jan Hájek	(Netherlands) Jesse Huta Galung (Spain) Albert Ramos (Czech Republic) Ivo Minář (France) Nicolas Devilder
March 21	2011 Morocco Tennis Tour – Marrakech; Marrakesh, Morocco; Regular series Clay (red) – €42,500+H – 32S/32Q/16D; Singles – Doubles	(Australia) Peter Luczak (Italy) Alessandro Motti; 7–6(5), 7–6(3)	(United States) James Cerretani (Canada) Adil Shamasdin	(France) Augustin Gensse (Czech Republic) Jan Hájek	(Netherlands) Jesse Huta Galung (Spain) Albert Ramos (Czech Republic) Ivo Minář (France) Nicolas Devilder
March 21	2011 Green World ATP Challenger; Pingguo, China; Regular series Hard – $35,000+H – 32S/32Q/16D; Singles – Doubles	(Japan) Go Soeda; 6–4, 7–5	(Germany) Matthias Bachinger	(Germany) Cedrik-Marcel Stebe (Slovakia) Lukáš Lacko	(United Kingdom) Colin Fleming (Belarus) Uladzimir Ignatik (Belgium) Steve Darcis (Japan) Yūichi Sugita
March 21	2011 Green World ATP Challenger; Pingguo, China; Regular series Hard – $35,000+H – 32S/32Q/16D; Singles – Doubles	(Russia) Mikhail Elgin (Russia) Alexander Kudryavtsev; 6–3, 6–2	(Finland) Harri Heliövaara (New Zealand) Jose Rubin Statham	(Germany) Cedrik-Marcel Stebe (Slovakia) Lukáš Lacko	(United Kingdom) Colin Fleming (Belarus) Uladzimir Ignatik (Belgium) Steve Darcis (Japan) Yūichi Sugita
March 21	2011 Città di Caltanissetta; Caltanissetta, Italy; Regular series Clay (red) – €30,000+H – 32S/32Q/16D; Singles – Doubles	(Austria) Andreas Haider-Maurer; 6–1, 7–6(1)	(Italy) Matteo Viola	(Romania) Adrian Ungur (Spain) Adrián Menéndez	(Netherlands) Thomas Schoorel (Italy) Gianluca Naso (Italy) Stefano Galvani (Slovenia) Aljaž Bedene
March 21	2011 Città di Caltanissetta; Caltanissetta, Italy; Regular series Clay (red) – €30,000+H – 32S/32Q/16D; Singles – Doubles	(Italy) Daniele Bracciali (Italy) Simone Vagnozzi; 3–6, 7–6(2), [10–7]	(Italy) Daniele Giorgini (Romania) Adrian Ungur	(Romania) Adrian Ungur (Spain) Adrián Menéndez	(Netherlands) Thomas Schoorel (Italy) Gianluca Naso (Italy) Stefano Galvani (Slovenia) Aljaž Bedene
March 28	2011 Open Barletta; Barletta, Italy; Regular series Clay (red) – €42,500+H – 32S/32Q/16D; Singles – Doubles	(Slovenia) Aljaž Bedene; 7–5, 6–3	(Italy) Filippo Volandri	(Austria) Andreas Haider-Maurer (Czech Republic) Lukáš Rosol	(Netherlands) Thomas Schoorel (Czech Republic) Jaroslav Pospíšil (Italy) Simone Vagnozzi (Italy) Alessio di Mauro
March 28	2011 Open Barletta; Barletta, Italy; Regular series Clay (red) – €42,500+H – 32S/32Q/16D; Singles – Doubles	(Czech Republic) Lukáš Rosol (Slovakia) Igor Zelenay; 6–3, 6–2	(Austria) Martin Fischer (Austria) Andreas Haider-Maurer	(Austria) Andreas Haider-Maurer (Czech Republic) Lukáš Rosol	(Netherlands) Thomas Schoorel (Czech Republic) Jaroslav Pospíšil (Italy) Simone Vagnozzi (Italy) Alessio di Mauro
March 28	2011 Seguros Bolívar Open Barranquilla; Barranquilla, Colombia; Regular series Hard – $35,000+H – 32S/32Q/16D; Singles – Doubles	(Argentina) Facundo Bagnis; 1–6, 7–6(4), 6–0	(Argentina) Diego Junqueira	(Italy) Flavio Cipolla (Argentina) Horacio Zeballos	(Argentina) Martín Vassallo Argüello (Italy) Paolo Lorenzi (Brazil) Rogério Dutra da Silva (Argentina) Eduardo Schwank
March 28	2011 Seguros Bolívar Open Barranquilla; Barranquilla, Colombia; Regular series Hard – $35,000+H – 32S/32Q/16D; Singles – Doubles	(Italy) Flavio Cipolla (Italy) Paolo Lorenzi; 6–3, 6–4	(Colombia) Alejandro Falla (Colombia) Eduardo Struvay	(Italy) Flavio Cipolla (Argentina) Horacio Zeballos	(Argentina) Martín Vassallo Argüello (Italy) Paolo Lorenzi (Brazil) Rogério Dutra da Silva (Argentina) Eduardo Schwank
March 28	2011 Open Prévadiès Saint–Brieuc; Saint-Brieuc, France; Regular series Clay (red) (i) – €30,000+H – 32S/32Q/16D; Singles – Doubles	(France) Maxime Teixeira; 6–3, 6–0	(France) Benoît Paire	(Argentina) Máximo González (Poland) Michał Przysiężny	(France) Augustin Gensse (France) David Guez (France) Laurent Rochette (Poland) Jerzy Janowicz
March 28	2011 Open Prévadiès Saint–Brieuc; Saint-Brieuc, France; Regular series Clay (red) (i) – €30,000+H – 32S/32Q/16D; Singles – Doubles	(Poland) Tomasz Bednarek (Sweden) Andreas Siljeström; 6–4, 6–7(4), [14–12]	(France) Grégoire Burquier (France) Romain Jouan	(Argentina) Máximo González (Poland) Michał Przysiężny	(France) Augustin Gensse (France) David Guez (France) Laurent Rochette (Poland) Jerzy Janowicz

=== April ===
Week of	Tournament	Champions	Runners-up	Semifinalists	Quarterfinalists
April 4	2011 Seguros Bolívar Open Pereira; Pereira, Colombia; Regular series Clay – $50,000+H – 32S/32Q/16D; Singles – Doubles	(Italy) Paolo Lorenzi; 7–5, 6–2	(Brazil) Rogério Dutra da Silva	(Colombia) Juan Sebastián Cabal (Spain) Javier Martí	(Argentina) Facundo Bagnis (Argentina) Marco Trungelliti (Colombia) Eduardo Struvay (Italy) Riccardo Ghedin
April 4	2011 Seguros Bolívar Open Pereira; Pereira, Colombia; Regular series Clay – $50,000+H – 32S/32Q/16D; Singles – Doubles	(Uruguay) Marcel Felder (Colombia) Carlos Salamanca; 7–6(5), 6–4	(Colombia) Alejandro Falla (Colombia) Eduardo Struvay	(Colombia) Juan Sebastián Cabal (Spain) Javier Martí	(Argentina) Facundo Bagnis (Argentina) Marco Trungelliti (Colombia) Eduardo Struvay (Italy) Riccardo Ghedin
April 4	2011 Pernambuco Brasil Open Series; Recife, Brazil; Regular series Hard – $35,000+H – 32S/32Q/16D; Singles – Doubles	(Japan) Tatsuma Ito; Walkover	(Brazil) Tiago Fernandes	(Brazil) Júlio Silva (Ecuador) Giovanni Lapentti	(Brazil) Guilherme Clézar (Brazil) Caio Zampieri (Brazil) André Ghem (Brazil) Ricardo Hocevar
April 4	2011 Pernambuco Brasil Open Series; Recife, Brazil; Regular series Hard – $35,000+H – 32S/32Q/16D; Singles – Doubles	(Ecuador) Giovanni Lapentti (Brazil) Fernando Romboli; 6–2, 6–1	(Brazil) André Ghem (Brazil) Rodrigo Guidolin	(Brazil) Júlio Silva (Ecuador) Giovanni Lapentti	(Brazil) Guilherme Clézar (Brazil) Caio Zampieri (Brazil) André Ghem (Brazil) Ricardo Hocevar
April 4	2011 Internazionali di Monza e Brianza; Monza, Italy; Regular series Clay – €30,000+H – 32S/32Q/16D; Singles – Doubles	(Germany) Julian Reister; 3–6, 6–3, 6–3	(Italy) Alessio di Mauro	(Germany) Simon Greul (Germany) Andreas Beck	(Austria) Martin Fischer (Spain) Guillermo Olaso (Turkey) Marsel İlhan (Russia) Evgeny Donskoy
April 4	2011 Internazionali di Monza e Brianza; Monza, Italy; Regular series Clay – €30,000+H – 32S/32Q/16D; Singles – Doubles	(Sweden) Johan Brunström (Denmark) Frederik Nielsen; 5–7, 6–2, [10–7]	(United Kingdom) Jamie Delgado (United Kingdom) Jonathan Marray	(Germany) Simon Greul (Germany) Andreas Beck	(Austria) Martin Fischer (Spain) Guillermo Olaso (Turkey) Marsel İlhan (Russia) Evgeny Donskoy
April 11	2011 Soweto Open; Johannesburg, South Africa; Regular series Hard – €100,000+H – 32S/32Q/16D; Singles – Doubles	(South Africa) Izak van der Merwe; 6–7(2), 7–5, 6–3	(South Africa) Rik de Voest	(Germany) Dustin Brown (Australia) Greg Jones	(Australia) Matthew Ebden (Slovakia) Andrej Martin (Poland) Michał Przysiężny (Luxembourg) Gilles Müller
April 11	2011 Soweto Open; Johannesburg, South Africa; Regular series Hard – €100,000+H – 32S/32Q/16D; Singles – Doubles	(Germany) Michael Kohlmann (Austria) Alexander Peya; 6–2, 6–2	(Germany) Andre Begemann (Australia) Matthew Ebden	(Germany) Dustin Brown (Australia) Greg Jones	(Australia) Matthew Ebden (Slovakia) Andrej Martin (Poland) Michał Przysiężny (Luxembourg) Gilles Müller
April 11	2011 Status Athens Open; Athens, Greece; Regular series Hard – $85,000+H – 32S/32Q/16D; Singles – Doubles	(Germany) Matthias Bachinger walkover	(Russia) Dmitry Tursunov	(Switzerland) Stéphane Bohli (Israel) Dudi Sela	(Germany) Benjamin Becker (Spain) Guillermo Alcaide (Russia) Alexander Kudryavtsev (Kazakhstan) Evgeny Korolev
April 11	2011 Status Athens Open; Athens, Greece; Regular series Hard – $85,000+H – 32S/32Q/16D; Singles – Doubles	(United Kingdom) Colin Fleming (United States) Scott Lipsky walkover	(Germany) Matthias Bachinger (Germany) Benjamin Becker	(Switzerland) Stéphane Bohli (Israel) Dudi Sela	(Germany) Benjamin Becker (Spain) Guillermo Alcaide (Russia) Alexander Kudryavtsev (Kazakhstan) Evgeny Korolev
April 11	2011 Tallahassee Tennis Challenger; Tallahassee, United States; Regular series Hard – $50,000 – 32S/32Q/16D; Singles – Doubles	(United States) Donald Young; 6–4, 3–6, 6–3	(United States) Wayne Odesnik	(United States) James Blake (United States) Bobby Reynolds	(Germany) Rainer Schüttler (United States) Nicholas Monroe (Canada) Vasek Pospisil (United States) Alex Kuznetsov
April 11	2011 Tallahassee Tennis Challenger; Tallahassee, United States; Regular series Hard – $50,000 – 32S/32Q/16D; Singles – Doubles	(Canada) Vasek Pospisil (United States) Bobby Reynolds; 6–2, 6–4	(Japan) Go Soeda (United Kingdom) James Ward	(United States) James Blake (United States) Bobby Reynolds	(Germany) Rainer Schüttler (United States) Nicholas Monroe (Canada) Vasek Pospisil (United States) Alex Kuznetsov
April 11	2011 Aberto Santa Catarina de Tenis; Blumenau, Brazil; Regular series Clay – €35,000+H – 32S/32Q/16D; Singles – Doubles	(Argentina) José Acasuso; 6–2, 6–2	(Brazil) Marcelo Demoliner	(Argentina) Diego Junqueira (Slovenia) Aljaž Bedene	(Argentina) Leonardo Mayer (France) Éric Prodon (Argentina) Facundo Bagnis (Spain) Javier Martí
April 11	2011 Aberto Santa Catarina de Tenis; Blumenau, Brazil; Regular series Clay – €35,000+H – 32S/32Q/16D; Singles – Doubles	(Brazil) Franco Ferreiro (Brazil) André Sá; 6–2, 3–6, [10–4]	(Spain) Adrián Menéndez (Portugal) Leonardo Tavares	(Argentina) Diego Junqueira (Slovenia) Aljaž Bedene	(Argentina) Leonardo Mayer (France) Éric Prodon (Argentina) Facundo Bagnis (Spain) Javier Martí
April 11	2011 Rai Open; Rome, Italy; Regular series Clay – $30,000+H – 32S/32Q/16D; Singles – Doubles	(Netherlands) Thomas Schoorel; 7–5, 1–6, 6–3	(Slovakia) Martin Kližan	(Czech Republic) Ivo Minář (Germany) Andreas Beck	(Austria) Andreas Haider-Maurer (Turkey) Marsel İlhan (Germany) Julian Reister (Germany) Cedrik-Marcel Stebe
April 11	2011 Rai Open; Rome, Italy; Regular series Clay – $30,000+H – 32S/32Q/16D; Singles – Doubles	(Slovakia) Martin Kližan (Italy) Alessandro Motti; 7–6(3), 6–4	(Italy) Thomas Fabbiano (Italy) Walter Trusendi	(Czech Republic) Ivo Minář (Germany) Andreas Beck	(Austria) Andreas Haider-Maurer (Turkey) Marsel İlhan (Germany) Julian Reister (Germany) Cedrik-Marcel Stebe
April 18	2011 Tennis Napoli Cup; Naples, Italy; Regular series Clay – $30,000+H – 32S/32Q/16D; Singles – Doubles	(Netherlands) Thomas Schoorel; 6–2, 7–6(4)	(Italy) Filippo Volandri	(Czech Republic) Ivo Minář (Austria) Andreas Haider-Maurer	(Belgium) Steve Darcis (Portugal) Frederico Gil (Italy) Matteo Trevisan (Netherlands) Igor Sijsling
April 18	2011 Tennis Napoli Cup; Naples, Italy; Regular series Clay – $30,000+H – 32S/32Q/16D; Singles – Doubles	(United States) Travis Rettenmaier (Germany) Simon Stadler; 6–4, 6–4	(United States) Travis Parrott (Sweden) Andreas Siljeström	(Czech Republic) Ivo Minář (Austria) Andreas Haider-Maurer	(Belgium) Steve Darcis (Portugal) Frederico Gil (Italy) Matteo Trevisan (Netherlands) Igor Sijsling
April 18	2011 Santos Brasil Tennis Open; Santos, Brazil; Regular series Clay – $35,000 – 32S/32Q/16D; Singles – Doubles	(Brazil) João Souza; 6–4, 6–2	(Argentina) Diego Junqueira	(Brazil) Ricardo Mello (Argentina) Juan Pablo Brzezicki	(Argentina) Leonardo Mayer (Argentina) Sebastián Decoud (Japan) Yūichi Sugita (Slovenia) Aljaž Bedene
April 18	2011 Santos Brasil Tennis Open; Santos, Brazil; Regular series Clay – $35,000 – 32S/32Q/16D; Singles – Doubles	(Brazil) Franco Ferreiro (Brazil) André Sá; 6–3, 6–3	(Austria) Gerald Melzer (Brazil) José Pereira	(Brazil) Ricardo Mello (Argentina) Juan Pablo Brzezicki	(Argentina) Leonardo Mayer (Argentina) Sebastián Decoud (Japan) Yūichi Sugita (Slovenia) Aljaž Bedene
April 25	2011 Sarasota Open; Sarasota, United States; Regular series Hard – €75,000 – 32S/32Q/16D; Singles – Doubles	(United States) James Blake; 6–2, 6–2	(United States) Alex Bogomolov Jr.	(United States) Ryan Sweeting (Canada) Frank Dancevic	(Slovenia) Grega Žemlja (France) Éric Prodon (Canada) Pierre-Ludovic Duclos (United States) Michael Russell
April 25	2011 Sarasota Open; Sarasota, United States; Regular series Hard – €75,000 – 32S/32Q/16D; Singles – Doubles	(Australia) Ashley Fisher (Australia) Stephen Huss; 6–3, 6–4	(United States) Alex Bogomolov Jr. (United States) Alex Kuznetsov	(United States) Ryan Sweeting (Canada) Frank Dancevic	(Slovenia) Grega Žemlja (France) Éric Prodon (Canada) Pierre-Ludovic Duclos (United States) Michael Russell
April 25	2011 Prosperita Open; Ostrava, Czech Republic; Regular series Clay – $42,500 – 32S/32Q/16D; Singles – Doubles	(France) Stéphane Robert; 6–1, 6–3	(Hungary) Ádám Kellner	(France) Benoît Paire (France) David Guez	(Ukraine) Sergei Bubka (Russia) Alexander Kudryavtsev (France) Jonathan Eysseric (Belarus) Uladzimir Ignatik
April 25	2011 Prosperita Open; Ostrava, Czech Republic; Regular series Clay – $42,500 – 32S/32Q/16D; Singles – Doubles	(France) Olivier Charroin (France) Stéphane Robert; 6–4, 6–3	(Latvia) Andis Juška (Russia) Alexander Kudryavtsev	(France) Benoît Paire (France) David Guez	(Ukraine) Sergei Bubka (Russia) Alexander Kudryavtsev (France) Jonathan Eysseric (Belarus) Uladzimir Ignatik
April 25	2011 Torneo Internacional AGT; León, Mexico; Regular series Hard – €35,000+H – 32S/32Q/16D; Singles – Doubles	(United States) Bobby Reynolds; 6–3, 6–3	(Germany) Andre Begemann	(Moldova) Roman Borvanov (Canada) Vasek Pospisil	(United Kingdom) Jamie Baker (United States) Rajeev Ram (Guatemala) Christopher Díaz Figueroa (Japan) Tatsuma Ito
April 25	2011 Torneo Internacional AGT; León, Mexico; Regular series Hard – €35,000+H – 32S/32Q/16D; Singles – Doubles	(United States) Rajeev Ram (United States) Bobby Reynolds; 6–3, 6–2	(Germany) Andre Begemann (United Kingdom) Chris Eaton	(Moldova) Roman Borvanov (Canada) Vasek Pospisil	(United Kingdom) Jamie Baker (United States) Rajeev Ram (Guatemala) Christopher Díaz Figueroa (Japan) Tatsuma Ito

=== May ===
Week of	Tournament	Champions	Runners-up	Semifinalists	Quarterfinalists
May 2	2011 Strabag Prague Open; Prague, Czech Republic; Regular series Clay – $85,000 – 32S/32Q/16D; Singles – Doubles	(Czech Republic) Lukáš Rosol; 7–6(1), 5–2 retired	(United States) Alex Bogomolov Jr.	(Chile) Fernando González (Czech Republic) Ivo Minář	(Slovakia) Lukáš Lacko (France) Julien Benneteau (Czech Republic) Jan Hájek (Germany) Dennis Blömke
May 2	2011 Strabag Prague Open; Prague, Czech Republic; Regular series Clay – $85,000 – 32S/32Q/16D; Singles – Doubles	(Czech Republic) František Čermák (Czech Republic) Lukáš Rosol; 6–3, 6–4	(Germany) Christopher Kas (Austria) Alexander Peya	(Chile) Fernando González (Czech Republic) Ivo Minář	(Slovakia) Lukáš Lacko (France) Julien Benneteau (Czech Republic) Jan Hájek (Germany) Dennis Blömke
May 2	2011 Savannah Challenger; Savannah, United States; Regular series Clay – €50,000 – 32S/32Q/16D; Singles – Doubles	(United States) Wayne Odesnik; 6–4, 6–4	(United States) Donald Young	(United States) Ryan Harrison (United States) Michael Russell	(Bosnia and Herzegovina) Amer Delić (United States) Bobby Reynolds (United States) Michael Yani (United States) James Blake
May 2	2011 Savannah Challenger; Savannah, United States; Regular series Clay – €50,000 – 32S/32Q/16D; Singles – Doubles	(South Africa) Rik de Voest (South Africa) Izak van der Merwe; 6–3, 6–3	(United States) Sekou Bangoura (United States) Jesse Witten	(United States) Ryan Harrison (United States) Michael Russell	(Bosnia and Herzegovina) Amer Delić (United States) Bobby Reynolds (United States) Michael Yani (United States) James Blake
May 2	2011 Roma Open; Rome, Italy; Regular series Hard – $30,000+H – 32S/32Q/16D; Singles – Doubles	(Italy) Simone Bolelli; 2–6, 6–1, 6–3	(Argentina) Eduardo Schwank	(Germany) Dustin Brown (Italy) Simone Vagnozzi	(Germany) Tobias Kamke (Argentina) José Acasuso (Spain) Pablo Carreño Busta (Austria) Martin Fischer
May 2	2011 Roma Open; Rome, Italy; Regular series Hard – $30,000+H – 32S/32Q/16D; Singles – Doubles	(Colombia) Juan Sebastián Cabal (Colombia) Robert Farah; 2–6, 6–3, [11–9]	(Mexico) Santiago González (United States) Travis Rettenmaier	(Germany) Dustin Brown (Italy) Simone Vagnozzi	(Germany) Tobias Kamke (Argentina) José Acasuso (Spain) Pablo Carreño Busta (Austria) Martin Fischer
May 9	2011 BNP Paribas Primrose Bordeaux; Bordeaux, France; Regular series Clay – $85,000+H – 32S/32Q/16D; Singles – Doubles	(France) Marc Gicquel; 6–2, 6–4	(Argentina) Horacio Zeballos	(France) Julien Benneteau (France) Stéphane Robert	(France) Jérémy Chardy (Chile) Paul Capdeville (France) Nicolas Mahut (France) Florent Serra
May 9	2011 BNP Paribas Primrose Bordeaux; Bordeaux, France; Regular series Clay – $85,000+H – 32S/32Q/16D; Singles – Doubles	(United Kingdom) Jamie Delgado (United Kingdom) Jonathan Marray; 7–5, 6–3	(France) Julien Benneteau (France) Nicolas Mahut	(France) Julien Benneteau (France) Stéphane Robert	(France) Jérémy Chardy (Chile) Paul Capdeville (France) Nicolas Mahut (France) Florent Serra
May 9	2011 Busan Open Challenger Tennis; Busan, South Korea; Regular series Hard – €75,000+H – 32S/32Q/16D; Singles – Doubles	(Israel) Dudi Sela; 6–2, 6–7(5), 6–3	(Japan) Tatsuma Ito	(Chinese Taipei) Lu Yen-hsun (Japan) Go Soeda	(Australia) Greg Jones (Israel) Amir Weintraub (Japan) Yūichi Sugita (Canada) Vasek Pospisil
May 9	2011 Busan Open Challenger Tennis; Busan, South Korea; Regular series Hard – €75,000+H – 32S/32Q/16D; Singles – Doubles	(South Korea) Im Kyu-tae (Thailand) Danai Udomchoke; 6–4, 6–4	(United Kingdom) Jamie Baker (Canada) Vasek Pospisil	(Chinese Taipei) Lu Yen-hsun (Japan) Go Soeda	(Australia) Greg Jones (Israel) Amir Weintraub (Japan) Yūichi Sugita (Canada) Vasek Pospisil
May 9	2011 Zagreb Open; Zagreb, Croatia; Regular series Clay (red) – $50,000 – 32S/32Q/16D; Singles – Doubles	(Argentina) Diego Junqueira; 6–3, 6–4	(Brazil) João Souza	(Slovakia) Martin Kližan (Italy) Andrea Arnaboldi	(Croatia) Ivan Dodig (Croatia) Nikola Mektić (Croatia) Kristijan Mesaroš (Germany) Dominik Meffert
May 9	2011 Zagreb Open; Zagreb, Croatia; Regular series Clay (red) – $50,000 – 32S/32Q/16D; Singles – Doubles	(Spain) Daniel Muñoz de la Nava (Spain) Rubén Ramírez Hidalgo; 6–2, 7–6(10)	(Croatia) Mate Pavić (Croatia) Franko Škugor	(Slovakia) Martin Kližan (Italy) Andrea Arnaboldi	(Croatia) Ivan Dodig (Croatia) Nikola Mektić (Croatia) Kristijan Mesaroš (Germany) Dominik Meffert
May 16	2011 Fergana Challenger; Fergana, Uzbekistan; Regular series Hard – €35,000+H – 32S/32Q/16D; Singles – Doubles	(Israel) Dudi Sela; 6–2, 6–1	(Australia) Greg Jones	(Slovakia) Miloslav Mečíř Jr. (Japan) Yūichi Sugita	(South Africa) Raven Klaasen (Thailand) Danai Udomchoke (Chinese Taipei) Tsung-hua Yang (Russia) Denis Matsukevich
May 16	2011 Fergana Challenger; Fergana, Uzbekistan; Regular series Hard – €35,000+H – 32S/32Q/16D; Singles – Doubles	(United States) John Paul Fruttero (South Africa) Raven Klaasen; 6–0, 6–3	(South Korea) Kyu-tae Im (Thailand) Danai Udomchoke	(Slovakia) Miloslav Mečíř Jr. (Japan) Yūichi Sugita	(South Africa) Raven Klaasen (Thailand) Danai Udomchoke (Chinese Taipei) Tsung-hua Yang (Russia) Denis Matsukevich
May 16	2011 Trofeo Paolo Corazzi; Cremona, Italy; Regular series Hard – $30,000+H – 32S/32Q/16D; Singles – Doubles	(Russia) Igor Kunitsyn; 6–2, 7–6(2)	(Germany) Rainer Schüttler	(Spain) Pablo Carreño Busta (Australia) Matthew Ebden	(Croatia) Roko Karanušić (Tunisia) Malek Jaziri (Italy) Andrea Arnaboldi (Switzerland) Alexander Sadecky
May 16	2011 Trofeo Paolo Corazzi; Cremona, Italy; Regular series Hard – $30,000+H – 32S/32Q/16D; Singles – Doubles	(Philippines) Treat Conrad Huey (India) Purav Raja; 6–1, 6–2	(Poland) Tomasz Bednarek (Poland) Mateusz Kowalczyk	(Spain) Pablo Carreño Busta (Australia) Matthew Ebden	(Croatia) Roko Karanušić (Tunisia) Malek Jaziri (Italy) Andrea Arnaboldi (Switzerland) Alexander Sadecky
May 23	2011 Alessandria Challenger; Alessandria, Italy; Regular series Clay – $30,000+H – 32S/32Q/16D; Singles – Doubles	(Spain) Pablo Carreño Busta; 3–6, 6–3, 7–5	(Spain) Roberto Bautista Agut	(Argentina) Facundo Bagnis (Denmark) Frederik Nielsen	(Argentina) Diego Junqueira (Belgium) Ruben Bemelmans (Argentina) Juan Pablo Brzezicki (Australia) Peter Luczak
May 23	2011 Alessandria Challenger; Alessandria, Italy; Regular series Clay – $30,000+H – 32S/32Q/16D; Singles – Doubles	(Austria) Martin Fischer (Austria) Philipp Oswald; 6–7(5), 7–5, [10–6]	(South Africa) Jeff Coetzee (Sweden) Andreas Siljeström	(Argentina) Facundo Bagnis (Denmark) Frederik Nielsen	(Argentina) Diego Junqueira (Belgium) Ruben Bemelmans (Argentina) Juan Pablo Brzezicki (Australia) Peter Luczak
May 30	2011 UniCredit Czech Open; Prostějov, Czech Republic; Regular series Clay – $106,500+H – 32S/32Q/16D; Singles – Doubles	(Kazakhstan) Yuri Schukin; 6–4, 4–6, 6–0	(Italy) Flavio Cipolla	(Czech Republic) Radek Štěpánek (Spain) Daniel Muñoz de la Nava	(Russia) Mikhail Youzhny (Italy) Andreas Seppi (Dominican Republic) Víctor Estrella (Kazakhstan) Evgeny Korolev
May 30	2011 UniCredit Czech Open; Prostějov, Czech Republic; Regular series Clay – $106,500+H – 32S/32Q/16D; Singles – Doubles	(Ukraine) Sergei Bubka (Spain) Adrián Menéndez; 7–5, 6–2	(Spain) David Marrero (Spain) Rubén Ramírez Hidalgo	(Czech Republic) Radek Štěpánek (Spain) Daniel Muñoz de la Nava	(Russia) Mikhail Youzhny (Italy) Andreas Seppi (Dominican Republic) Víctor Estrella (Kazakhstan) Evgeny Korolev
May 30	2011 Aegon Trophy; Nottingham, United Kingdom; Regular series Grass – €64,000+H – 32S/32Q/16D; Singles – Doubles	(Luxembourg) Gilles Müller; 7–6(4), 6–2	(Germany) Matthias Bachinger	(Japan) Tatsuma Ito (Australia) Bernard Tomic	(Switzerland) Stéphane Bohli (Russia) Dmitry Tursunov (Australia) Matthew Ebden (Australia) Marinko Matosevic
May 30	2011 Aegon Trophy; Nottingham, United Kingdom; Regular series Grass – €64,000+H – 32S/32Q/16D; Singles – Doubles	(United Kingdom) Colin Fleming (United Kingdom) Ross Hutchins; 4–6, 7–6(8), [13–11]	(Germany) Dustin Brown (Germany) Martin Emmrich	(Japan) Tatsuma Ito (Australia) Bernard Tomic	(Switzerland) Stéphane Bohli (Russia) Dmitry Tursunov (Australia) Matthew Ebden (Australia) Marinko Matosevic
May 30	2011 Franken Challenge; Fürth, Germany; Regular series Clay – €42,500+H – 32S/32Q/16D; Singles – Doubles	(Portugal) João Sousa; 6–2, 0–6, 6–2	(Germany) Jan-Lennard Struff	(Serbia) Nikola Ćirić (Germany) Denis Gremelmayr	(Germany) Tobias Kamke (Poland) Jerzy Janowicz (Germany) Simon Greul (France) Romain Jouan
May 30	2011 Franken Challenge; Fürth, Germany; Regular series Clay – €42,500+H – 32S/32Q/16D; Singles – Doubles	(Australia) Rameez Junaid (Germany) Frank Moser; 6–2, 6–7(2), [10–6]	(Chile) Jorge Aguilar (Ecuador) Júlio César Campozano	(Serbia) Nikola Ćirić (Germany) Denis Gremelmayr	(Germany) Tobias Kamke (Poland) Jerzy Janowicz (Germany) Simon Greul (France) Romain Jouan
May 30	2011 Rijeka Open; Rijeka, Croatia; Regular series Clay – €30,000+H – 32S/32Q/16D; Singles – Doubles	(Portugal) Rui Machado; 6–3, 6–0	(Slovenia) Grega Žemlja	(Italy) Paolo Lorenzi (Italy) Simone Vagnozzi	(Slovenia) Blaž Kavčič (Croatia) Kristijan Mesaroš (Romania) Adrian Ungur (Argentina) Andrés Molteni
May 30	2011 Rijeka Open; Rijeka, Croatia; Regular series Clay – €30,000+H – 32S/32Q/16D; Singles – Doubles	(Italy) Paolo Lorenzi (Brazil) Júlio Silva; 6–3, 6–2	(Croatia) Lovro Zovko (Croatia) Dino Marcan	(Italy) Paolo Lorenzi (Italy) Simone Vagnozzi	(Slovenia) Blaž Kavčič (Croatia) Kristijan Mesaroš (Romania) Adrian Ungur (Argentina) Andrés Molteni

=== June ===
Week of	Tournament	Champions	Runners-up	Semifinalists	Quarterfinalists
June 6	2011 Aegon Nottingham Challenge; Nottingham, Great Britain; Regular series Grass – $64,000 – 32S/32Q/16D; Singles – Doubles	(Israel) Dudi Sela; 6–4, 3–6, 7–5	(France) Jérémy Chardy	(South Africa) Izak van der Merwe (Australia) Bernard Tomic	(Slovakia) Karol Beck (Slovenia) Grega Žemlja (France) Édouard Roger-Vasselin (South Africa) Rik de Voest
June 6	2011 Aegon Nottingham Challenge; Nottingham, Great Britain; Regular series Grass – $64,000 – 32S/32Q/16D; Singles – Doubles	(South Africa) Rik de Voest (Canada) Adil Shamasdin; 6–3, 7–6(9)	(Philippines) Treat Conrad Huey (South Africa) Izak van der Merwe	(South Africa) Izak van der Merwe (Australia) Bernard Tomic	(Slovakia) Karol Beck (Slovenia) Grega Žemlja (France) Édouard Roger-Vasselin (South Africa) Rik de Voest
June 6	2011 Košice Open; Košice, Slovakia; Regular series Clay – €30,000+H – 32S/32Q/16D; Singles – Doubles	(Germany) Simon Greul; 6–2, 6–1	(Romania) Victor Crivoi	(Russia) Evgeny Donskoy (Czech Republic) Lukáš Rosol	(Italy) Andrea Arnaboldi (United States) Wayne Odesnik (France) David Guez (Slovakia) Dominik Hrbatý
June 6	2011 Košice Open; Košice, Slovakia; Regular series Clay – €30,000+H – 32S/32Q/16D; Singles – Doubles	(Germany) Simon Greul (Germany) Bastian Knittel; 2–6, 6–3, [11–9]	(Argentina) Facundo Bagnis (Argentina) Eduardo Schwank	(Russia) Evgeny Donskoy (Czech Republic) Lukáš Rosol	(Italy) Andrea Arnaboldi (United States) Wayne Odesnik (France) David Guez (Slovakia) Dominik Hrbatý
June 13	2011 Aspria Tennis Cup Trofeo City Life; Milan, Italy; Regular series Clay – €30,000+H – 32S/32Q/16D; Singles – Doubles	(Spain) Albert Ramos; 6–4, 3–0, ret.	(Kazakhstan) Evgeny Korolev	(Italy) Stefano Galvani (Argentina) Brian Dabul	(Argentina) Horacio Zeballos (Italy) Alberto Brizzi (France) Jonathan Dasnières de Veigy (Monaco) Benjamin Balleret
June 13	2011 Aspria Tennis Cup Trofeo City Life; Milan, Italy; Regular series Clay – €30,000+H – 32S/32Q/16D; Singles – Doubles	(Spain) Adrián Menéndez (Italy) Simone Vagnozzi; 0–6, 6–3, [10–5]	(Italy) Andrea Arnaboldi (Portugal) Leonardo Tavares	(Italy) Stefano Galvani (Argentina) Brian Dabul	(Argentina) Horacio Zeballos (Italy) Alberto Brizzi (France) Jonathan Dasnières de Veigy (Monaco) Benjamin Balleret
June 20	2011 Jalisco Open; Guadalajara, Mexico; Regular series Hard – $100,000 – 32S/32Q/16D; Singles – Doubles	(Chile) Paul Capdeville; 7–5, 6–1	(Canada) Pierre-Ludovic Duclos	(Brazil) João Souza (Czech Republic) Jan Mertl	(Canada) Vasek Pospisil (Colombia) Carlos Salamanca (United Kingdom) Jamie Baker (France) Ludovic Walter
June 20	2011 Jalisco Open; Guadalajara, Mexico; Regular series Hard – $100,000 – 32S/32Q/16D; Singles – Doubles	(Canada) Vasek Pospisil (United States) Bobby Reynolds; 6–4, 6–7(6), [10–6]	(Canada) Pierre-Ludovic Duclos (Slovakia) Ivo Klec	(Brazil) João Souza (Czech Republic) Jan Mertl	(Canada) Vasek Pospisil (Colombia) Carlos Salamanca (United Kingdom) Jamie Baker (France) Ludovic Walter
June 20	2011 Marburg Open; Marburg, Germany; Regular series Clay – €30,000+H – 32S/32Q/16D; Singles – Doubles	(Germany) Björn Phau; 6–4, 2–6, 6–3	(Czech Republic) Jan Hájek	(Spain) Albert Ramos (Argentina) Horacio Zeballos	(Kazakhstan) Yuri Schukin (United States) Wayne Odesnik (Hungary) Attila Balázs (Argentina) Diego Junqueira
June 20	2011 Marburg Open; Marburg, Germany; Regular series Clay – €30,000+H – 32S/32Q/16D; Singles – Doubles	(Germany) Martin Emmrich (Germany) Björn Phau; 7–6(3), 6–2	(Argentina) Federico Delbonis (Argentina) Horacio Zeballos	(Spain) Albert Ramos (Argentina) Horacio Zeballos	(Kazakhstan) Yuri Schukin (United States) Wayne Odesnik (Hungary) Attila Balázs (Argentina) Diego Junqueira
June 27	2011 Sparkassen Open; Braunschweig, Germany; Regular series Clay – $106,500+H – 32S/32Q/16D; Singles – Doubles	(Czech Republic) Lukáš Rosol; 7–5, 7–6(2)	(Russia) Evgeny Donskoy	(France) Stéphane Robert (Czech Republic) Jan Hájek	(Argentina) Horacio Zeballos (Portugal) Frederico Gil (Netherlands) Thomas Schoorel (Czech Republic) Jaroslav Pospíšil
June 27	2011 Sparkassen Open; Braunschweig, Germany; Regular series Clay – $106,500+H – 32S/32Q/16D; Singles – Doubles	(Germany) Martin Emmrich (Sweden) Andreas Siljeström; 0–6, 6–4, [10–7]	(France) Olivier Charroin (France) Stéphane Robert	(France) Stéphane Robert (Czech Republic) Jan Hájek	(Argentina) Horacio Zeballos (Portugal) Frederico Gil (Netherlands) Thomas Schoorel (Czech Republic) Jaroslav Pospíšil
June 27	2011 Sporting Challenger; Turin, Italy; Tretorn SERIE+ Clay – €85,000+H – 32S/32Q/16D; Singles – Doubles	(Argentina) Carlos Berlocq; 6–4, 6–3	(Spain) Albert Ramos	(Italy) Alessandro Giannessi (Spain) Rubén Ramírez Hidalgo	(Brazil) Júlio Silva (Spain) Daniel Muñoz de la Nava (Slovakia) Martin Kližan (Argentina) Diego Junqueira
June 27	2011 Sporting Challenger; Turin, Italy; Tretorn SERIE+ Clay – €85,000+H – 32S/32Q/16D; Singles – Doubles	(Austria) Martin Fischer (Austria) Philipp Oswald; 6–3, 6–4	(Belarus) Uladzimir Ignatik (Slovakia) Martin Kližan	(Italy) Alessandro Giannessi (Spain) Rubén Ramírez Hidalgo	(Brazil) Júlio Silva (Spain) Daniel Muñoz de la Nava (Slovakia) Martin Kližan (Argentina) Diego Junqueira
June 27	2011 Nielsen Pro Tennis Ch'ships; Winnetka, United States; Regular series Hard – €50,000 – 32S/32Q/16D; Singles – Doubles	(United States) James Blake; 6–3, 6–1	(United States) Bobby Reynolds	(United States) Donald Young (South Africa) Rik de Voest	(United States) Michael Russell (United States) Robby Ginepri (New Zealand) Michael Venus (Chile) Paul Capdeville
June 27	2011 Nielsen Pro Tennis Ch'ships; Winnetka, United States; Regular series Hard – €50,000 – 32S/32Q/16D; Singles – Doubles	(Philippines) Treat Conrad Huey (United States) Bobby Reynolds; 7–6^{(9–7)}, 6–4	(Australia) Jordan Kerr (United States) Travis Parrott	(United States) Donald Young (South Africa) Rik de Voest	(United States) Michael Russell (United States) Robby Ginepri (New Zealand) Michael Venus (Chile) Paul Capdeville

=== July ===
Week of	Tournament	Champions	Runners-up	Semifinalists	Quarterfinalists
July 4	2011 Open Diputación Ciudad de Pozoblanco; Pozoblanco, Spain; Tretorn SERIE+ Hard – €85,000+H – 32S/32Q/16D; Singles – Doubles	(France) Kenny de Schepper; 2–6, 7–5, 6–3	(Spain) Iván Navarro	(Ukraine) Illya Marchenko (Russia) Konstantin Kravchuk	(Spain) Roberto Bautista Agut (Russia) Alexander Kudryavtsev (Spain) Pablo Carreño Busta (Germany) Rainer Schüttler
July 4	2011 Open Diputación Ciudad de Pozoblanco; Pozoblanco, Spain; Tretorn SERIE+ Hard – €85,000+H – 32S/32Q/16D; Singles – Doubles	(Russia) Mikhail Elgin (Russia) Alexander Kudryavtsev walkover	(Ukraine) Illya Marchenko (Ukraine) Denys Molchanov	(Ukraine) Illya Marchenko (Russia) Konstantin Kravchuk	(Spain) Roberto Bautista Agut (Russia) Alexander Kudryavtsev (Spain) Pablo Carreño Busta (Germany) Rainer Schüttler
July 4	2011 The Hague Open; Scheveningen, Netherlands; Tretorn SERIE+ Clay – €42,500+H – 32S/32Q/16D; Singles – Doubles	(Belgium) Steve Darcis; 6–3, 4–6, 6–2	(Turkey) Marsel İlhan	(France) Augustin Gensse (Czech Republic) Dušan Lojda	(Belgium) David Goffin (Netherlands) Matwé Middelkoop (France) Éric Prodon (Czech Republic) Ivo Minář
July 4	2011 The Hague Open; Scheveningen, Netherlands; Tretorn SERIE+ Clay – €42,500+H – 32S/32Q/16D; Singles – Doubles	(Australia) Colin Ebelthite (Australia) Adam Feeney; 6–4, 6–7(5–7), [10–7]	(Australia) Rameez Junaid (Australia) Sadik Kadir	(France) Augustin Gensse (Czech Republic) Dušan Lojda	(Belgium) David Goffin (Netherlands) Matwé Middelkoop (France) Éric Prodon (Czech Republic) Ivo Minář
July 4	2011 Oberstaufen Cup; Oberstaufen, Germany; Regular series Clay – €30,000+H – 32S/32Q/16D; Singles – Doubles	(Germany) Daniel Brands; 6–4, 7–6(7–3)	(Germany) Andreas Beck	(Germany) Cedrik-Marcel Stebe (Serbia) Nikola Ćirić	(Brazil) André Ghem (Austria) Martin Fischer (Chile) Jorge Aguilar (Germany) Simon Greul
July 4	2011 Oberstaufen Cup; Oberstaufen, Germany; Regular series Clay – €30,000+H – 32S/32Q/16D; Singles – Doubles	(Austria) Martin Fischer (Austria) Philipp Oswald; 7–6^{(7–1)}, 6–3	(Poland) Tomasz Bednarek (Poland) Mateusz Kowalczyk	(Germany) Cedrik-Marcel Stebe (Serbia) Nikola Ćirić	(Brazil) André Ghem (Austria) Martin Fischer (Chile) Jorge Aguilar (Germany) Simon Greul
July 4	2011 Carisap Tennis Cup; San Benedetto, Italy; Regular series Clay – €30,000+H – 32S/32Q/16D; Singles – Doubles	(Romania) Adrian Ungur; 7–5, 6–2	(Italy) Stefano Galvani	(Italy) Paolo Lorenzi (Spain) Pere Riba	(Italy) Simone Vagnozzi (Italy) Alessandro Giannessi (Italy) Alessio di Mauro (France) Benoît Paire
July 4	2011 Carisap Tennis Cup; San Benedetto, Italy; Regular series Clay – €30,000+H – 32S/32Q/16D; Singles – Doubles	(Italy) Alessio di Mauro (Italy) Alessandro Motti; 7–6^{(7–5)}, 4–6, [10–7]	(Italy) Daniele Giorgini (Italy) Stefano Travaglia	(Italy) Paolo Lorenzi (Spain) Pere Riba	(Italy) Simone Vagnozzi (Italy) Alessandro Giannessi (Italy) Alessio di Mauro (France) Benoît Paire
July 11	2011 Open Seguros Bolívar; Bogotá, Colombia; Regular series Clay – €125,000+H – 32S/32Q/16D; Singles – Doubles	(Spain) Feliciano López; 6–4, 6–3	(Colombia) Carlos Salamanca	(Argentina) Horacio Zeballos (South Africa) Izak van der Merwe	(Brazil) João Souza (Chile) Guillermo Rivera Aránguiz (Argentina) Facundo Argüello (Colombia) Alejandro González
July 11	2011 Open Seguros Bolívar; Bogotá, Colombia; Regular series Clay – €125,000+H – 32S/32Q/16D; Singles – Doubles	(Philippines) Treat Conrad Huey (South Africa) Izak van der Merwe; 7–6^{(7–3)}, 6–7^{(5–7)}, [7–2], def.	(Colombia) Juan Sebastián Cabal (Colombia) Robert Farah	(Argentina) Horacio Zeballos (South Africa) Izak van der Merwe	(Brazil) João Souza (Chile) Guillermo Rivera Aránguiz (Argentina) Facundo Argüello (Colombia) Alejandro González
July 11	2011 BNP Paribas Polish Open; Sopot, Poland; Tretorn SERIE+ Clay – €106,500 – 32S/32Q/16D; Singles – Doubles	(France) Éric Prodon; 6–1, 6–3	(Serbia) Nikola Ćirić	(France) Marc Gicquel (Czech Republic) Jan Hájek	(Germany) Andreas Beck (France) Stéphane Robert (France) Florent Serra (Belgium) Steve Darcis
July 11	2011 BNP Paribas Polish Open; Sopot, Poland; Tretorn SERIE+ Clay – €106,500 – 32S/32Q/16D; Singles – Doubles	(Poland) Mariusz Fyrstenberg (Poland) Marcin Matkowski; 7–5, 7–6^{(7–4)}	(France) Olivier Charroin (France) Stéphane Robert	(France) Marc Gicquel (Czech Republic) Jan Hájek	(Germany) Andreas Beck (France) Stéphane Robert (France) Florent Serra (Belgium) Steve Darcis
July 11	2011 Comerica Bank Challenger; Aptos, USA; Regular series Hard – €75,000 – 32S/32Q/16D; Singles – Doubles	(Lithuania) Laurynas Grigelis; 6–2, 7–6^{(7–4)}	(Serbia) Ilija Bozoljac	(Russia) Igor Kunitsyn (Australia) Carsten Ball	(New Zealand) Michael Venus (Australia) Matthew Ebden (United States) Wayne Odesnik (United Kingdom) Alex Bogdanovic
July 11	2011 Comerica Bank Challenger; Aptos, USA; Regular series Hard – €75,000 – 32S/32Q/16D; Singles – Doubles	(Australia) Carsten Ball (Australia) Chris Guccione; 7–6^{(7–5)}, 6–4	(United States) John Paul Fruttero (South Africa) Raven Klaasen	(Russia) Igor Kunitsyn (Australia) Carsten Ball	(New Zealand) Michael Venus (Australia) Matthew Ebden (United States) Wayne Odesnik (United Kingdom) Alex Bogdanovic
July 11	2011 Challenger Banque Nationale de Granby; Granby, Canada; Regular series Hard – $50,000+H – 32S/32Q/16D; Singles – Doubles	(France) Édouard Roger-Vasselin; 7–6^{(11–9)}, 4–6, 6–1	(Germany) Matthias Bachinger	(France) Arnaud Clément (Slovakia) Karol Beck	(Israel) Dudi Sela (France) Nicolas Mahut (Canada) Vasek Pospisil (Japan) Tatsuma Ito
July 11	2011 Challenger Banque Nationale de Granby; Granby, Canada; Regular series Hard – $50,000+H – 32S/32Q/16D; Singles – Doubles	(Slovakia) Karol Beck (France) Édouard Roger-Vasselin; 6–1, 6–3	(Germany) Matthias Bachinger (Germany) Frank Moser	(France) Arnaud Clément (Slovakia) Karol Beck	(Israel) Dudi Sela (France) Nicolas Mahut (Canada) Vasek Pospisil (Japan) Tatsuma Ito
July 18	2011 Poznań Porsche Open; Poznań, Poland; Tretorn SERIE+ Clay – €85,000+H – 32S/32Q/16D; Singles – Doubles	(Portugal) Rui Machado; 6–3, 6–3	(Poland) Jerzy Janowicz	(France) Stéphane Robert (Kazakhstan) Yuri Schukin	(Italy) Marco Crugnola (France) Augustin Gensse (France) Vincent Millot (Czech Republic) Dušan Lojda
July 18	2011 Poznań Porsche Open; Poznań, Poland; Tretorn SERIE+ Clay – €85,000+H – 32S/32Q/16D; Singles – Doubles	(France) Olivier Charroin (France) Stéphane Robert; 6–2, 6–3	(Brazil) Franco Ferreiro (Brazil) André Sá	(France) Stéphane Robert (Kazakhstan) Yuri Schukin	(Italy) Marco Crugnola (France) Augustin Gensse (France) Vincent Millot (Czech Republic) Dušan Lojda
July 18	2011 Orbetello Challenger; Orbetello, Italy; Regular series Clay – €64,000+H – 32S/32Q/16D; Singles – Doubles	(Italy) Filippo Volandri; 4–6, 6–3, 6–2	(Italy) Matteo Viola	(France) Romain Jouan (France) Édouard Roger-Vasselin	(France) Benoît Paire (Italy) Paolo Lorenzi (France) Florent Serra (Netherlands) Thiemo de Bakker
July 18	2011 Orbetello Challenger; Orbetello, Italy; Regular series Clay – €64,000+H – 32S/32Q/16D; Singles – Doubles	(Austria) Julian Knowle (Slovakia) Igor Zelenay; 6–1, 7–6(2)	(France) Romain Jouan (France) Benoît Paire	(France) Romain Jouan (France) Édouard Roger-Vasselin	(France) Benoît Paire (Italy) Paolo Lorenzi (France) Florent Serra (Netherlands) Thiemo de Bakker
July 18	2011 Fifth Third Bank Tennis Championships; Lexington, USA; Regular series Hard – €50,000 – 32S/32Q/16D; Singles – Doubles	(United States) Wayne Odesnik; 7–5, 6–4	(United Kingdom) James Ward	(Canada) Pierre-Ludovic Duclos (United States) Greg Ouellette	(Canada) Érik Chvojka (United States) Blake Strode (United Kingdom) Jamie Baker (United States) Michael Yani
July 18	2011 Fifth Third Bank Tennis Championships; Lexington, USA; Regular series Hard – €50,000 – 32S/32Q/16D; Singles – Doubles	(Australia) Jordan Kerr (United States) David Martin; 6–3, 6–4	(United Kingdom) James Ward (United States) Michael Yani	(Canada) Pierre-Ludovic Duclos (United States) Greg Ouellette	(Canada) Érik Chvojka (United States) Blake Strode (United Kingdom) Jamie Baker (United States) Michael Yani
July 18	2011 Penza Cup; Penza, Russia; Regular series Hard – €50,000 – 32S/32Q/16D; Singles – Doubles	(Spain) Arnau Brugués Davi; 4–6, 6–3, 6–1	(Kazakhstan) Mikhail Kukushkin	(Switzerland) Marco Chiudinelli (Israel) Amir Weintraub	(Croatia) Nikola Mektić (Ukraine) Sergei Bubka (Russia) Ervand Gasparyan (Russia) Mikhail Ledovskikh
July 18	2011 Penza Cup; Penza, Russia; Regular series Hard – €50,000 – 32S/32Q/16D; Singles – Doubles	(Spain) Arnau Brugués Davi (Tunisia) Malek Jaziri; 6–7^{(6–8)}, 6–2, [10–8]	(Ukraine) Sergei Bubka (Spain) Adrián Menéndez	(Switzerland) Marco Chiudinelli (Israel) Amir Weintraub	(Croatia) Nikola Mektić (Ukraine) Sergei Bubka (Russia) Ervand Gasparyan (Russia) Mikhail Ledovskikh
July 18	2011 Manta Open; Manta, Ecuador; Regular series Hard – $35,000+H – 32S/23Q/16D; Singles – Doubles	(Argentina) Brian Dabul; 6–1, 6–3	(Argentina) Facundo Argüello	(Italy) Riccardo Ghedin (Brazil) Rogério Dutra da Silva	(Ecuador) Iván Endara (South Africa) Raven Klaasen (Ecuador) Júlio César Campozano (Chile) Guillermo Rivera Aránguiz
July 18	2011 Manta Open; Manta, Ecuador; Regular series Hard – $35,000+H – 32S/23Q/16D; Singles – Doubles	(Argentina) Brian Dabul (South Africa) Izak van der Merwe; 6–1, 6–7 (2), [11–9]	(United States) John Paul Fruttero (South Africa) Raven Klaasen	(Italy) Riccardo Ghedin (Brazil) Rogério Dutra da Silva	(Ecuador) Iván Endara (South Africa) Raven Klaasen (Ecuador) Júlio César Campozano (Chile) Guillermo Rivera Aránguiz
July 25	2011 Tampere Open; Tampere, Finland; Regular series Clay – €42,500 – 32S/32Q/16D; Singles – Doubles	(France) Éric Prodon; 6–1, 3–6, 6–2	(France) Augustin Gensse	(France) Jonathan Dasnières de Veigy (Finland) Henri Kontinen	(Finland) Timo Nieminen (France) Jonathan Eysseric (France) David Guez (Czech Republic) Dušan Lojda
July 25	2011 Tampere Open; Tampere, Finland; Regular series Clay – €42,500 – 32S/32Q/16D; Singles – Doubles	(France) Jonathan Dasnières de Veigy (France) David Guez; 5–7, 6–4, [10–5]	(France) Pierre-Hugues Herbert (France) Nicolas Renavand	(France) Jonathan Dasnières de Veigy (Finland) Henri Kontinen	(Finland) Timo Nieminen (France) Jonathan Eysseric (France) David Guez (Czech Republic) Dušan Lojda
July 25	2011 ATP China International Tennis Challenge; Wuhai, China; Regular series Hard – €35,000+H – 32S/32Q/16D; Singles – Doubles	(Japan) Go Soeda; 7–5, 6–4	(South Africa) Raven Klaasen	(Chinese Taipei) Yang Tsung-hua (Spain) Íñigo Cervantes-Huegun	(South Korea) Lim Yong-kyu (Thailand) Danai Udomchoke (Israel) Amir Weintraub (United States) Nicholas Monroe
July 25	2011 ATP China International Tennis Challenge; Wuhai, China; Regular series Hard – €35,000+H – 32S/32Q/16D; Singles – Doubles	(Chinese Taipei) Lee Hsin-han (Chinese Taipei) Yang Tsung-hua; 6–2, 7–6^{(7–4)}	(China) Feng He (China) Zhang Ze	(Chinese Taipei) Yang Tsung-hua (Spain) Íñigo Cervantes-Huegun	(South Korea) Lim Yong-kyu (Thailand) Danai Udomchoke (Israel) Amir Weintraub (United States) Nicholas Monroe
July 25	2011 Internationaler Apano Cup; Dortmund, Germany; Regular series Clay – €30,000+H – 32S/32Q/16D; Singles – Doubles	(Argentina) Leonardo Mayer; 6–3, 6–2	(Netherlands) Thomas Schoorel	(Belgium) Maxime Authom (Argentina) Facundo Bagnis	(Argentina) Horacio Zeballos (Russia) Teymuraz Gabashvili (Germany) Björn Phau (Slovakia) Martin Kližan
July 25	2011 Internationaler Apano Cup; Dortmund, Germany; Regular series Clay – €30,000+H – 32S/32Q/16D; Singles – Doubles	(Germany) Dominik Meffert (Germany) Björn Phau; 6–4, 6–3	(Russia) Teymuraz Gabashvili (Russia) Andrey Kuznetsov	(Belgium) Maxime Authom (Argentina) Facundo Bagnis	(Argentina) Horacio Zeballos (Russia) Teymuraz Gabashvili (Germany) Björn Phau (Slovakia) Martin Kližan
July 25	2011 Guzzini Challenger; Recanati, Italy; Regular series Hard – €30,000+H – 32S/32Q/16D; Singles – Doubles	(France) Fabrice Martin; 6–1, 6–7^{(6–8)}, 7–6^{(7–3)}	(France) Kenny de Schepper	(Italy) Stefano Galvani (Slovenia) Grega Žemlja	(Denmark) Frederik Nielsen (Italy) Flavio Cipolla (Italy) Federico Gaio (Spain) Roberto Bautista Agut
July 25	2011 Guzzini Challenger; Recanati, Italy; Regular series Hard – €30,000+H – 32S/32Q/16D; Singles – Doubles	(Denmark) Frederik Nielsen (United Kingdom) Ken Skupski; 6–4, 7–5	(Italy) Federico Gaio (India) Purav Raja	(Italy) Stefano Galvani (Slovenia) Grega Žemlja	(Denmark) Frederik Nielsen (Italy) Flavio Cipolla (Italy) Federico Gaio (Spain) Roberto Bautista Agut
July 25	2011 President's Cup; Astana, Kazakhstan; Regular series Hard – €30,000+H – 32S/32Q/16D; Singles – Doubles	(Kazakhstan) Mikhail Kukushkin; 6–3, 6–4	(Ukraine) Sergei Bubka	(Kazakhstan) Andrey Golubev (Tunisia) Malek Jaziri	(Spain) Arnau Brugués Davi (Russia) Konstantin Kravchuk (Slovakia) Karol Beck (Switzerland) Marco Chiudinelli
July 25	2011 President's Cup; Astana, Kazakhstan; Regular series Hard – €30,000+H – 32S/32Q/16D; Singles – Doubles	(Russia) Konstantin Kravchuk (Ukraine) Denys Molchanov; 7–6^{(7–4)}, 6–7^{(1–7)}, [10–3]	(Spain) Arnau Brugués Davi (Tunisia) Malek Jaziri	(Kazakhstan) Andrey Golubev (Tunisia) Malek Jaziri	(Spain) Arnau Brugués Davi (Russia) Konstantin Kravchuk (Slovakia) Karol Beck (Switzerland) Marco Chiudinelli

=== August ===
Week of	Tournament	Champions	Runners-up	Semifinalists	Quarterfinalists
August 1	2011 Odlum Brown Vancouver Open; Vancouver, Canada; Regular series Hard – €100,000 – 32S/32Q/16D; Singles – Doubles	(United Kingdom) James Ward; 7–5, 6–4	(United States) Robby Ginepri	(Canada) Vasek Pospisil (United States) Bobby Reynolds	(United Kingdom) Alex Bogdanovic (Moldova) Roman Borvanov (Slovenia) Grega Žemlja (France) Clément Reix
August 1	2011 Odlum Brown Vancouver Open; Vancouver, Canada; Regular series Hard – €100,000 – 32S/32Q/16D; Singles – Doubles	(Philippines) Treat Conrad Huey (United States) Travis Parrott; 6–2, 1–6, [16–14]	(Australia) Jordan Kerr (United States) David Martin	(Canada) Vasek Pospisil (United States) Bobby Reynolds	(United Kingdom) Alex Bogdanovic (Moldova) Roman Borvanov (Slovenia) Grega Žemlja (France) Clément Reix
August 1	2011 Open Castilla y León; Segovia, Spain; Regular series Hard – €85,000+H – 32S/32Q/16D; Singles – Doubles	(Slovakia) Karol Beck; 6–4, 7–6^{(7–4)}	(France) Grégoire Burquier	(Switzerland) Marco Chiudinelli (Russia) Evgeny Donskoy	(Russia) Teymuraz Gabashvili (Finland) Henri Kontinen (France) Fabrice Martin (France) Nicolas Mahut
August 1	2011 Open Castilla y León; Segovia, Spain; Regular series Hard – €85,000+H – 32S/32Q/16D; Singles – Doubles	(Sweden) Johan Brunström (Denmark) Frederik Nielsen; 6–2, 3–6, [10–6]	(France) Nicolas Mahut (Croatia) Lovro Zovko	(Switzerland) Marco Chiudinelli (Russia) Evgeny Donskoy	(Russia) Teymuraz Gabashvili (Finland) Henri Kontinen (France) Fabrice Martin (France) Nicolas Mahut
August 1	2011 Beijing International Challenger; Beijing, China; Regular series Hard – €75,000+H – 32S/32Q/16D; Singles – Doubles	(Uzbekistan) Farrukh Dustov; 6–1, 7–6^{(7–4)}	(Chinese Taipei) Yang Tsung-hua	(Israel) Dudi Sela (South Korea) Lim Yong-kyu	(Spain) Íñigo Cervantes-Huegun (Spain) Guillermo Olaso (Chinese Taipei) Chen Ti (Slovakia) Kamil Čapkovič
August 1	2011 Beijing International Challenger; Beijing, China; Regular series Hard – €75,000+H – 32S/32Q/16D; Singles – Doubles	(Thailand) Sanchai Ratiwatana (Thailand) Sonchat Ratiwatana; 6–7^{(7–4)}, 6–3, [10–3]	(Finland) Harri Heliövaara (Sweden) Michael Ryderstedt	(Israel) Dudi Sela (South Korea) Lim Yong-kyu	(Spain) Íñigo Cervantes-Huegun (Spain) Guillermo Olaso (Chinese Taipei) Chen Ti (Slovakia) Kamil Čapkovič
August 1	2011 MasterCard Tennis Cup; Campos do Jordão, Brazil; Regular series Hard – €50,000+H – 32S/32Q/16D; Singles – Doubles	(Brazil) Rogério Dutra da Silva; 6–4, 6–7^{(7–5)}, 6–3	(South Africa) Izak van der Merwe	(Brazil) Ricardo Mello (Argentina) Brian Dabul	(Brazil) Júlio Silva (Colombia) Carlos Salamanca (Chile) Paul Capdeville (Colombia) Robert Farah
August 1	2011 MasterCard Tennis Cup; Campos do Jordão, Brazil; Regular series Hard – €50,000+H – 32S/32Q/16D; Singles – Doubles	(Colombia) Juan Sebastián Cabal (Colombia) Robert Farah; 6–2, 6–3	(Brazil) Ricardo Hocevar (Brazil) Júlio Silva	(Brazil) Ricardo Mello (Argentina) Brian Dabul	(Brazil) Júlio Silva (Colombia) Carlos Salamanca (Chile) Paul Capdeville (Colombia) Robert Farah
August 1	2011 Trani Cup; Trani, Italy; Regular series Clay – €30,000+H – 32S/32Q/16D; Singles – Doubles	(Belgium) Steve Darcis; 4–6, 6–3, 6–2	(Argentina) Leonardo Mayer	(Portugal) Rui Machado (Italy) Andrea Arnaboldi	(Austria) Martin Fischer (Italy) Matteo Trevisan (Romania) Adrian Ungur (Belgium) David Goffin
August 1	2011 Trani Cup; Trani, Italy; Regular series Clay – €30,000+H – 32S/32Q/16D; Singles – Doubles	(Chile) Jorge Aguilar (Argentina) Andrés Molteni; 6–4, 6–4	(Italy) Giulio Di Meo (Italy) Stefano Ianni	(Portugal) Rui Machado (Italy) Andrea Arnaboldi	(Austria) Martin Fischer (Italy) Matteo Trevisan (Romania) Adrian Ungur (Belgium) David Goffin
August 8	2011 San Marino CEPU Open; City of San Marino, San Marino; Regular series Clay – €85,000+H – 32S/32Q/16D; Singles – Doubles	(Italy) Potito Starace; 6–1, 3–0, ret.	(Slovakia) Martin Kližan	(France) Benoît Paire (France) Marc Gicquel	(Czech Republic) Jan Hájek (Argentina) Leonardo Mayer (Germany) Björn Phau (Czech Republic) Lukáš Rosol
August 8	2011 San Marino CEPU Open; City of San Marino, San Marino; Regular series Clay – €85,000+H – 32S/32Q/16D; Singles – Doubles	(United States) James Cerretani (Germany) Philipp Marx; 6–3, 6–4	(Italy) Daniele Bracciali (Austria) Julian Knowle	(France) Benoît Paire (France) Marc Gicquel	(Czech Republic) Jan Hájek (Argentina) Leonardo Mayer (Germany) Björn Phau (Czech Republic) Lukáš Rosol
August 8	2011 LG&T Tennis Challenger; Binghamton, United States; Regular series Hard – €50,000 – 32S/32Q/16D; Singles – Doubles	(Chile) Paul Capdeville; 7–6^{(7–4)}, 6–3	(United States) Wayne Odesnik	(South Africa) Izak van der Merwe (Slovenia) Grega Žemlja	(Belgium) Ruben Bemelmans (Russia) Evgeny Donskoy (Australia) Greg Jones (Australia) Carsten Ball
August 8	2011 LG&T Tennis Challenger; Binghamton, United States; Regular series Hard – €50,000 – 32S/32Q/16D; Singles – Doubles	(Colombia) Juan Sebastián Cabal (Colombia) Robert Farah; 6–4, 6–3	(Philippines) Treat Conrad Huey (Denmark) Frederik Nielsen	(South Africa) Izak van der Merwe (Slovenia) Grega Žemlja	(Belgium) Ruben Bemelmans (Russia) Evgeny Donskoy (Australia) Greg Jones (Australia) Carsten Ball
August 8	2011 Samarkand Challenger; Samarkand, Uzbekistan; Regular series Clay – €35,000+H – 32S/32Q/16D; Singles – Doubles	(Uzbekistan) Denis Istomin; 7–6^{(7–2)}, retired	(Tunisia) Malek Jaziri	(Austria) Gerald Melzer (Slovakia) Miloslav Mečíř Jr.	(Moldova) Radu Albot (Chinese Taipei) Yang Tsung-hua (Romania) Victor Crivoi (Serbia) Miljan Zekić
August 8	2011 Samarkand Challenger; Samarkand, Uzbekistan; Regular series Clay – €35,000+H – 32S/32Q/16D; Singles – Doubles	(Russia) Mikhail Elgin (Russia) Alexander Kudryavtsev; 7–6^{(7–4)}, 2–6, [10–7]	(Moldova) Radu Albot (Russia) Andrey Kuznetsov	(Austria) Gerald Melzer (Slovakia) Miloslav Mečíř Jr.	(Moldova) Radu Albot (Chinese Taipei) Yang Tsung-hua (Romania) Victor Crivoi (Serbia) Miljan Zekić
August 15	2011 Zucchetti Kos Tennis Cup; Cordenons, Italy; Tretorn SERIE+ Clay – €85,000+H – 32S/32Q/16D; Singles – Doubles	(Spain) Daniel Muñoz de la Nava; 6–4, 2–6, 6–2	(Argentina) Nicolás Pastor	(Italy) Alessandro Giannessi (Slovakia) Martin Kližan	(Hungary) Attila Balázs (Italy) Simone Bolelli (Romania) Victor Crivoi (Germany) Dustin Brown
August 15	2011 Zucchetti Kos Tennis Cup; Cordenons, Italy; Tretorn SERIE+ Clay – €85,000+H – 32S/32Q/16D; Singles – Doubles	(Austria) Julian Knowle (Germany) Michael Kohlmann; 2–6, 7–5, [10–5]	(Australia) Colin Ebelthite (Australia) Adam Feeney	(Italy) Alessandro Giannessi (Slovakia) Martin Kližan	(Hungary) Attila Balázs (Italy) Simone Bolelli (Romania) Victor Crivoi (Germany) Dustin Brown
August 15	2011 Karshi Challenger; Qarshi, Uzbekistan; Regular series Hard – €50,000 – 32S/32Q/16D; Singles – Doubles	(Uzbekistan) Denis Istomin; 6–3, 1–6, 6–1	(Slovenia) Blaž Kavčič	(Russia) Mikhail Ledovskikh (Russia) Konstantin Kravchuk	(Uzbekistan) Farrukh Dustov (Russia) Alexander Kudryavtsev (Ukraine) Denys Molchanov (Serbia) Dušan Lajović
August 15	2011 Karshi Challenger; Qarshi, Uzbekistan; Regular series Hard – €50,000 – 32S/32Q/16D; Singles – Doubles	(Russia) Mikhail Elgin (Russia) Alexander Kudryavtsev; 3–6, 6–3, [11–9]	(Russia) Konstantin Kravchuk (Ukraine) Denys Molchanov	(Russia) Mikhail Ledovskikh (Russia) Konstantin Kravchuk	(Uzbekistan) Farrukh Dustov (Russia) Alexander Kudryavtsev (Ukraine) Denys Molchanov (Serbia) Dušan Lajović
August 15	2011 Concurso Int'l de Tenis – San Sebastián; San Sebastián, Spain; Regular series Clay – €30,000+H – 32S/32Q/16D; Singles – Doubles	(Spain) Albert Ramos; 6–1, 6–2	(Spain) Pere Riba	(Spain) Daniel Gimeno Traver (Italy) Simone Vagnozzi	(Spain) Roberto Bautista Agut (Portugal) João Sousa (Portugal) Pedro Sousa (Netherlands) Matwé Middelkoop
August 15	2011 Concurso Int'l de Tenis – San Sebastián; San Sebastián, Spain; Regular series Clay – €30,000+H – 32S/32Q/16D; Singles – Doubles	(Italy) Stefano Ianni (Italy) Simone Vagnozzi; 6–3, 6–4	(Spain) Daniel Gimeno Traver (Spain) Israel Sevilla	(Spain) Daniel Gimeno Traver (Italy) Simone Vagnozzi	(Spain) Roberto Bautista Agut (Portugal) João Sousa (Portugal) Pedro Sousa (Netherlands) Matwé Middelkoop
August 22	2011 Savoldi–Cò – Trofeo Dimmidisì; Manerbio, Italy; Regular series Clay – €85,000+H – 32S/32Q/16D; Singles – Doubles	(Romania) Adrian Ungur; 4–6, 7–6^{(7–4)}, 6–2	(Germany) Peter Gojowczyk	(Spain) Rubén Ramírez Hidalgo (Slovakia) Martin Kližan	(Italy) Marco Crugnola (Germany) Dustin Brown (Argentina) Federico Delbonis (Serbia) Boris Pašanski
August 22	2011 Savoldi–Cò – Trofeo Dimmidisì; Manerbio, Italy; Regular series Clay – €85,000+H – 32S/32Q/16D; Singles – Doubles	(Germany) Dustin Brown (Croatia) Lovro Zovko; 7–6^{(7–4)}, 7–5	(Italy) Alessio di Mauro (Italy) Alessandro Motti	(Spain) Rubén Ramírez Hidalgo (Slovakia) Martin Kližan	(Italy) Marco Crugnola (Germany) Dustin Brown (Argentina) Federico Delbonis (Serbia) Boris Pašanski
August 22	2011 Astana Cup; Astana, Kazakhstan; Regular series Hard – €50,000+H – 32S/32Q/16D; Singles – Doubles	(Germany) Rainer Schüttler; 7–6^{(8–6)}, 4–6, 6–4	(Russia) Teymuraz Gabashvili	(United Kingdom) Jamie Baker (Russia) Alexander Kudryavtsev	(France) Fabrice Martin (Moldova) Radu Albot (Czech Republic) Jan Minář (Chinese Taipei) Chen Ti
August 22	2011 Astana Cup; Astana, Kazakhstan; Regular series Hard – €50,000+H – 32S/32Q/16D; Singles – Doubles	(India) Karan Rastogi (India) Vishnu Vardhan; 7–6^{(7–3)}, 2–6, [10–8]	(Finland) Harri Heliövaara (Ukraine) Denys Molchanov	(United Kingdom) Jamie Baker (Russia) Alexander Kudryavtsev	(France) Fabrice Martin (Moldova) Radu Albot (Czech Republic) Jan Minář (Chinese Taipei) Chen Ti
August 29	2011 Città di Como Challenger; Como, Italy; Regular series Clay – €30,000+H – 32S/32Q/16D; Singles – Doubles	(Spain) Pablo Carreño Busta; 6–4, 7–6^{(7–4)}	(Germany) Andreas Beck	(Italy) Paolo Lorenzi (France) Benoît Paire	(France) Stéphane Robert (Croatia) Kristijan Mesaroš (Serbia) Boris Pašanski (Germany) Simon Greul
August 29	2011 Città di Como Challenger; Como, Italy; Regular series Clay – €30,000+H – 32S/32Q/16D; Singles – Doubles	(Argentina) Federico Delbonis (Argentina) Renzo Olivo; 6–1, 6–4	(Argentina) Martín Alund (Argentina) Facundo Argüello	(Italy) Paolo Lorenzi (France) Benoît Paire	(France) Stéphane Robert (Croatia) Kristijan Mesaroš (Serbia) Boris Pašanski (Germany) Simon Greul
August 29	2011 Chang-Sat Bangkok Open; Bangkok, Thailand; Regular series Hard – €50,000+H – 32S/32Q/16D; Singles – Doubles	(Germany) Cedrik-Marcel Stebe; 7–5, 6–1	(Israel) Amir Weintraub	(Russia) Konstantin Kravchuk (Finland) Harri Heliövaara	(Canada) Érik Chvojka (United Kingdom) James Ward (South Korea) Lim Yong-kyu (China) Li Zhe
August 29	2011 Chang-Sat Bangkok Open; Bangkok, Thailand; Regular series Hard – €50,000+H – 32S/32Q/16D; Singles – Doubles	(Canada) Pierre-Ludovic Duclos (Italy) Riccardo Ghedin; 6–4, 6–4	(United States) Nicholas Monroe (France) Ludovic Walter	(Russia) Konstantin Kravchuk (Finland) Harri Heliövaara	(Canada) Érik Chvojka (United Kingdom) James Ward (South Korea) Lim Yong-kyu (China) Li Zhe

=== September ===
Week of	Tournament	Champions	Runners-up	Semifinalists	Quarterfinalists
September 5	2011 AON Open Challenger; Genoa, Italy; Regular series Clay – €85,000+H – 32S/32Q/16D; Singles – Doubles	(Slovakia) Martin Kližan; 6–3, 6–1	(Argentina) Leonardo Mayer	(Portugal) Frederico Gil (Argentina) Horacio Zeballos	(Italy) Alessandro Giannessi (Italy) Gianluca Naso (Portugal) Rui Machado (Italy) Thomas Fabbiano
September 5	2011 AON Open Challenger; Genoa, Italy; Regular series Clay – €85,000+H – 32S/32Q/16D; Singles – Doubles	(Germany) Dustin Brown (Argentina) Horacio Zeballos; 6–2, 7–5	(Australia) Jordan Kerr (United States) Travis Parrott	(Portugal) Frederico Gil (Argentina) Horacio Zeballos	(Italy) Alessandro Giannessi (Italy) Gianluca Naso (Portugal) Rui Machado (Italy) Thomas Fabbiano
September 5	2011 Shanghai Challenger; Shanghai, China; Regular series Hard – €50,000 – 32S/32Q/16D; Singles – Doubles	(Germany) Cedrik-Marcel Stebe; 6–4, 4–6, 7–5	(Russia) Alexander Kudryavtsev	(Estonia) Jürgen Zopp (Czech Republic) Jan Hernych	(Finland) Harri Heliövaara (Slovenia) Luka Gregorc (Chinese Taipei) Yang Tsung-hua (Germany) Dominik Meffert
September 5	2011 Shanghai Challenger; Shanghai, China; Regular series Hard – €50,000 – 32S/32Q/16D; Singles – Doubles	(Thailand) Sanchai Ratiwatana (Thailand) Sonchat Ratiwatana; 7–6^{(7–4)}, 6–3	(South Africa) Fritz Wolmarans (United States) Michael Yani	(Estonia) Jürgen Zopp (Czech Republic) Jan Hernych	(Finland) Harri Heliövaara (Slovenia) Luka Gregorc (Chinese Taipei) Yang Tsung-hua (Germany) Dominik Meffert
September 5	2011 TEAN International; Alphen aan den Rijn, Netherlands; Regular series Clay – €42,500 – 32S/32Q/16D; Singles – Doubles	(Netherlands) Igor Sijsling; 7–6^{(7–2)}, 6–3	(Germany) Jan-Lennard Struff	(Czech Republic) Marek Michalička (France) Augustin Gensse	(Netherlands) Thiemo de Bakker (France) Jonathan Eysseric (Czech Republic) Jan Mertl (Belgium) Maxime Authom
September 5	2011 TEAN International; Alphen aan den Rijn, Netherlands; Regular series Clay – €42,500 – 32S/32Q/16D; Singles – Doubles	(Netherlands) Thiemo de Bakker (Netherlands) Antal van der Duim; 6–4, 6–7^{(4–7)}, [10–6]	(Netherlands) Matwé Middelkoop (Netherlands) Igor Sijsling	(Czech Republic) Marek Michalička (France) Augustin Gensse	(Netherlands) Thiemo de Bakker (France) Jonathan Eysseric (Czech Republic) Jan Mertl (Belgium) Maxime Authom
September 5	2011 Copa Sevilla; Seville, Spain; Regular series Clay – €42,500+H – 32S/32Q/16D; Singles – Doubles	(Spain) Daniel Gimeno Traver; 6–3, 6–3	(Spain) Rubén Ramírez Hidalgo	(Spain) Pere Riba (Spain) Albert Ramos	(Serbia) Nikola Ćirić (Italy) Paolo Lorenzi (Russia) Evgeny Donskoy (Czech Republic) Michal Schmid
September 5	2011 Copa Sevilla; Seville, Spain; Regular series Clay – €42,500+H – 32S/32Q/16D; Singles – Doubles	(Spain) Daniel Muñoz de la Nava (Spain) Rubén Ramírez Hidalgo; 6–4, 6–7^{(4–7)}, [13–11]	(Spain) Gerard Granollers (Spain) Adrián Menéndez	(Spain) Pere Riba (Spain) Albert Ramos	(Serbia) Nikola Ćirić (Italy) Paolo Lorenzi (Russia) Evgeny Donskoy (Czech Republic) Michal Schmid
September 5	2011 Trophée des Alpilles; Saint-Rémy-de-Provence, France; Regular series Hard – €42,500+H – 32S/32Q/16D; Singles – Doubles	(France) Édouard Roger-Vasselin; 6–4, 6–3	(France) Arnaud Clément	(France) Nicolas Mahut (Slovakia) Lukáš Lacko	(Spain) Arnau Brugués Davi (Lithuania) Laurynas Grigelis (France) Élie Rousset (Belgium) Steve Darcis
September 5	2011 Trophée des Alpilles; Saint-Rémy-de-Provence, France; Regular series Hard – €42,500+H – 32S/32Q/16D; Singles – Doubles	(France) Pierre-Hugues Herbert (France) Édouard Roger-Vasselin; 6–0, 4–6, [10–7]	(France) Arnaud Clément (France) Nicolas Renavand	(France) Nicolas Mahut (Slovakia) Lukáš Lacko	(Spain) Arnau Brugués Davi (Lithuania) Laurynas Grigelis (France) Élie Rousset (Belgium) Steve Darcis
September 5	2011 Ropharma Challenger Brașov; Brașov, Romania; Regular series Clay – €30,000 – 32S/32Q/16D; Singles – Doubles	(France) Benoît Paire; 6–4, 3–0 ret.	(France) Maxime Teixeira	(Czech Republic) Jan Hájek (Romania) Adrian Ungur	(Romania) Victor Crivoi (Germany) Andreas Beck (Croatia) Antonio Veić (Czech Republic) Dušan Lojda
September 5	2011 Ropharma Challenger Brașov; Brașov, Romania; Regular series Clay – €30,000 – 32S/32Q/16D; Singles – Doubles	(Romania) Victor Anagnastopol (Romania) Florin Mergea; 6–2, 6–3	(Czech Republic) Dušan Lojda (France) Benoît Paire	(Czech Republic) Jan Hájek (Romania) Adrian Ungur	(Romania) Victor Crivoi (Germany) Andreas Beck (Croatia) Antonio Veić (Czech Republic) Dušan Lojda
September 12	2011 Pekao Szczecin Open; Szczecin, Poland; Regular series Clay – €106,500+H – 32S/32Q/16D; Singles – Doubles	(Portugal) Rui Machado; 2–6, 7–5, 6–2	(France) Éric Prodon	(Spain) Albert Montañés (Spain) Daniel Muñoz de la Nava	(Brazil) João Souza (Argentina) Horacio Zeballos (Argentina) Federico Delbonis (Italy) Alessandro Giannessi
September 12	2011 Pekao Szczecin Open; Szczecin, Poland; Regular series Clay – €106,500+H – 32S/32Q/16D; Singles – Doubles	(Poland) Marcin Gawron (Poland) Andriej Kapaś; 6–3, 6–4	(Kazakhstan) Andrey Golubev (Kazakhstan) Yuri Schukin	(Spain) Albert Montañés (Spain) Daniel Muñoz de la Nava	(Brazil) João Souza (Argentina) Horacio Zeballos (Argentina) Federico Delbonis (Italy) Alessandro Giannessi
September 12	2011 American Express – TED Open; Istanbul, Turkey; Regular series Hard – €100,000 – 32S/32Q/16D; Singles – Doubles	(Uzbekistan) Denis Istomin; 7–6^{(8–6)}, 6–4	(Germany) Philipp Kohlschreiber	(Tunisia) Malek Jaziri (Lithuania) Ričardas Berankis	(Spain) Arnau Brugués-Davi (Russia) Mikhail Ledovskikh (Republic of Ireland) James McGee (Kazakhstan) Mikhail Kukushkin
September 12	2011 American Express – TED Open; Istanbul, Turkey; Regular series Hard – €100,000 – 32S/32Q/16D; Singles – Doubles	(Australia) Carsten Ball (Germany) Andre Begemann; 6–2, 6–4	(France) Grégoire Burquier (Belgium) Yannick Mertens	(Tunisia) Malek Jaziri (Lithuania) Ričardas Berankis	(Spain) Arnau Brugués-Davi (Russia) Mikhail Ledovskikh (Republic of Ireland) James McGee (Kazakhstan) Mikhail Kukushkin
September 12	2011 Banja Luka Challenger; Banja Luka, Bosnia and Herzegovina; Regular series Clay – €64,000+H – 32S/32Q/16D; Singles – Doubles	(Slovenia) Blaž Kavčič; 6–4, 6–1	(Spain) Pere Riba	(Spain) Daniel Gimeno Traver (Italy) Simone Vagnozzi	(Bosnia and Herzegovina) Mirza Bašić (Spain) Pablo Carreño Busta (Croatia) Ante Pavić (Slovenia) Aljaž Bedene
September 12	2011 Banja Luka Challenger; Banja Luka, Bosnia and Herzegovina; Regular series Clay – €64,000+H – 32S/32Q/16D; Singles – Doubles	(Italy) Marco Crugnola (Spain) Rubén Ramírez Hidalgo; 7–6^{(7–3)}, 3–6, [10–8]	(Czech Republic) Jan Mertl (Netherlands) Matwé Middelkoop	(Spain) Daniel Gimeno Traver (Italy) Simone Vagnozzi	(Bosnia and Herzegovina) Mirza Bašić (Spain) Pablo Carreño Busta (Croatia) Ante Pavić (Slovenia) Aljaž Bedene
September 12	2011 USTA Challenger of Oklahoma; Tulsa, United States; Regular series Hard – €50,000 – 32S/32Q/16D; Singles – Doubles	(United States) Bobby Reynolds; 6–1, 6–3	(United States) Michael McClune	(United States) Sam Querrey (United States) Michael Russell	(United Kingdom) Alex Bogdanovic (United States) Daniel Kosakowski (United States) Tim Smyczek (United States) Rajeev Ram
September 12	2011 USTA Challenger of Oklahoma; Tulsa, United States; Regular series Hard – €50,000 – 32S/32Q/16D; Singles – Doubles	(United States) David Martin (United States) Bobby Reynolds; 6–4, 6–2	(United States) Sam Querrey (United States) Chris Wettengel	(United States) Sam Querrey (United States) Michael Russell	(United Kingdom) Alex Bogdanovic (United States) Daniel Kosakowski (United States) Tim Smyczek (United States) Rajeev Ram
September 12	2011 BH Tennis Open International Cup; Belo Horizonte, Brazil; Regular series Clay – €35,000+H – 32S/32Q/16D; Singles – Doubles	(Brazil) Júlio Silva; 6–4, 6–4	(Portugal) Gastão Elias	(Argentina) Eduardo Schwank (Brazil) Ricardo Hocevar	(Argentina) Máximo González (Argentina) Marco Trungelliti (Brazil) Eládio Ribeiro Neto (Brazil) Rogério Dutra da Silva
September 12	2011 BH Tennis Open International Cup; Belo Horizonte, Brazil; Regular series Clay – €35,000+H – 32S/32Q/16D; Singles – Doubles	(Argentina) Guido Andreozzi (Argentina) Eduardo Schwank; 6–2, 6–4	(Brazil) Ricardo Hocevar (Sweden) Christian Lindell	(Argentina) Eduardo Schwank (Brazil) Ricardo Hocevar	(Argentina) Máximo González (Argentina) Marco Trungelliti (Brazil) Eládio Ribeiro Neto (Brazil) Rogério Dutra da Silva
September 12	2011 Ningbo Challenger; Ningbo, China; Regular series Hard – €35,000+H – 32S/32Q/16D; Singles – Doubles	(Chinese Taipei) Lu Yen-hsun; 6–2, 3–6, 6–1	(Estonia) Jürgen Zopp	(Russia) Alexander Kudryavtsev (Germany) Cedrik-Marcel Stebe	(United Kingdom) Joshua Milton (Germany) Dominik Meffert (China) Zhang Ze (Chinese Taipei) Yang Tsung-hua
September 12	2011 Ningbo Challenger; Ningbo, China; Regular series Hard – €35,000+H – 32S/32Q/16D; Singles – Doubles	(India) Karan Rastogi (India) Divij Sharan; 3–6, 7–6^{(7–3)}, [13–11]	(Czech Republic) Jan Hernych (Estonia) Jürgen Zopp	(Russia) Alexander Kudryavtsev (Germany) Cedrik-Marcel Stebe	(United Kingdom) Joshua Milton (Germany) Dominik Meffert (China) Zhang Ze (Chinese Taipei) Yang Tsung-hua
September 12	2011 Internazionali di Tennis dell'Umbria; Todi, Italy; Regular series Clay – €30,000+H – 32S/32Q/16D; Singles – Doubles	(Argentina) Carlos Berlocq; 6–3, 6–1	(Italy) Filippo Volandri	(Italy) Paolo Lorenzi (France) Benoît Paire	(Austria) Martin Fischer (Serbia) Dušan Lajović (Spain) Adrián Menéndez (Italy) Stefano Galvani
September 12	2011 Internazionali di Tennis dell'Umbria; Todi, Italy; Regular series Clay – €30,000+H – 32S/32Q/16D; Singles – Doubles	(Italy) Stefano Ianni (Italy) Luca Vanni; 6–4, 1–6, [11–9]	(Austria) Martin Fischer (Italy) Alessandro Motti	(Italy) Paolo Lorenzi (France) Benoît Paire	(Austria) Martin Fischer (Serbia) Dušan Lajović (Spain) Adrián Menéndez (Italy) Stefano Galvani
September 19	2011 Tashkent Challenger; Tashkent, Uzbekistan; Regular series Hard – €125,000+H – 32S/32Q/16D; Singles – Doubles	(Uzbekistan) Denis Istomin; 6–4, 6–3	(Estonia) Jürgen Zopp	(South Africa) Raven Klaasen (Russia) Konstantin Kravchuk	(Ukraine) Denys Molchanov (Chinese Taipei) Tsung-hua Yang (Uzbekistan) Murad Inoyatov (Russia) Denis Matsukevich
September 19	2011 Tashkent Challenger; Tashkent, Uzbekistan; Regular series Hard – €125,000+H – 32S/32Q/16D; Singles – Doubles	(Finland) Harri Heliövaara (Ukraine) Denys Molchanov; 7–6^{(7–5)}, 7–6^{(7–3)}	(United States) John Paul Fruttero (South Africa) Raven Klaasen	(South Africa) Raven Klaasen (Russia) Konstantin Kravchuk	(Ukraine) Denys Molchanov (Chinese Taipei) Tsung-hua Yang (Uzbekistan) Murad Inoyatov (Russia) Denis Matsukevich
September 19	2011 Seguros Bolívar Open Cali; Cali, Colombia; Regular series Clay – €75,000 – 32S/32Q/16D; Singles – Doubles	(Colombia) Alejandro Falla; 6–4, 6–3	(Argentina) Eduardo Schwank	(Argentina) Marco Trungelliti (Dominican Republic) Víctor Estrella	(Argentina) Horacio Zeballos (Argentina) Facundo Bagnis (Argentina) Agustín Velotti (Colombia) Alejandro González
September 19	2011 Seguros Bolívar Open Cali; Cali, Colombia; Regular series Clay – €75,000 – 32S/32Q/16D; Singles – Doubles	(Colombia) Juan Sebastián Cabal (Colombia) Robert Farah; 7–5, 6–2	(Argentina) Facundo Bagnis (Argentina) Eduardo Schwank	(Argentina) Marco Trungelliti (Dominican Republic) Víctor Estrella	(Argentina) Horacio Zeballos (Argentina) Facundo Bagnis (Argentina) Agustín Velotti (Colombia) Alejandro González
September 19	2011 Türk Telecom İzmir Cup; İzmir, Turkey; Regular series Hard – €64,000+H – 32S/32Q/16D; Singles – Doubles	(Slovakia) Lukáš Lacko; 6–4, 6–3	(Turkey) Marsel İlhan	(Italy) Flavio Cipolla (Belgium) Steve Darcis	(Lithuania) Laurynas Grigelis (Ukraine) Sergei Bubka (France) Charles-Antoine Brézac (Lithuania) Ričardas Berankis
September 19	2011 Türk Telecom İzmir Cup; İzmir, Turkey; Regular series Hard – €64,000+H – 32S/32Q/16D; Singles – Doubles	(United States) Travis Rettenmaier (Germany) Simon Stadler; 6–0, 6–2	(Italy) Flavio Cipolla (Italy) Thomas Fabbiano	(Italy) Flavio Cipolla (Belgium) Steve Darcis	(Lithuania) Laurynas Grigelis (Ukraine) Sergei Bubka (France) Charles-Antoine Brézac (Lithuania) Ričardas Berankis
September 19	2011 ATP Challenger Trophy; Trnava, Slovakia; Regular series Clay – €64,000 – 32S/32Q/16D; Singles – Doubles	(Spain) Íñigo Cervantes-Huegun; 6–4, 7–6^{(7–3)}	(Slovakia) Pavol Červenák	(Czech Republic) Jan Hájek (Slovakia) Kamil Čapkovič	(Czech Republic) Jaroslav Pospíšil (Czech Republic) Dušan Lojda (Germany) Björn Phau (Kazakhstan) Yuri Schukin
September 19	2011 ATP Challenger Trophy; Trnava, Slovakia; Regular series Clay – €64,000 – 32S/32Q/16D; Singles – Doubles	(Australia) Colin Ebelthite (Czech Republic) Jaroslav Pospíšil; 6–3, 6–4	(Belarus) Aliaksandr Bury (Belarus) Andrei Vasilevski	(Czech Republic) Jan Hájek (Slovakia) Kamil Čapkovič	(Czech Republic) Jaroslav Pospíšil (Czech Republic) Dušan Lojda (Germany) Björn Phau (Kazakhstan) Yuri Schukin
September 19	2011 BMW Ljubljana Open; Ljubljana, Slovenia; Regular series Clay – €42,500 – 32S/32Q/16D; Singles – Doubles	(Italy) Paolo Lorenzi; 6–2, 6–4	(Slovenia) Grega Žemlja	(Slovenia) Aljaž Bedene (Germany) Daniel Brands	(Spain) Iván Navarro (Spain) Javier Martí (Canada) Frank Dancevic (Argentina) Leonardo Mayer
September 19	2011 BMW Ljubljana Open; Ljubljana, Slovenia; Regular series Clay – €42,500 – 32S/32Q/16D; Singles – Doubles	(Slovenia) Aljaž Bedene (Slovenia) Grega Žemlja; 6–3, 6–7^{(10–12)}, [12–10]	(Spain) Roberto Bautista Agut (Spain) Iván Navarro	(Slovenia) Aljaž Bedene (Germany) Daniel Brands	(Spain) Iván Navarro (Spain) Javier Martí (Canada) Frank Dancevic (Argentina) Leonardo Mayer
September 19	2011 Tetra Pak Tennis Cup; Campinas, Brazil; Regular series Clay – €35,000+H – 32S/32Q/16D; Singles – Doubles	(Argentina) Máximo González; 6–3, 6–2	(Brazil) Caio Zampieri	(Brazil) Júlio Silva (Brazil) Rogério Dutra da Silva	(Portugal) Gastão Elias (Uruguay) Marcel Felder (Germany) Denis Gremelmayr (Brazil) André Ghem
September 19	2011 Tetra Pak Tennis Cup; Campinas, Brazil; Regular series Clay – €35,000+H – 32S/32Q/16D; Singles – Doubles	(Uruguay) Marcel Felder (Brazil) Caio Zampieri; 7–5, 6–4	(Brazil) Fabrício Neis (Brazil) João Pedro Sorgi	(Brazil) Júlio Silva (Brazil) Rogério Dutra da Silva	(Portugal) Gastão Elias (Uruguay) Marcel Felder (Germany) Denis Gremelmayr (Brazil) André Ghem
September 26	2011 Aguascalientes Open; Aguascalientes, Mexico; Regular series Clay – €50,000+H – 32S/32Q/16D; Singles – Doubles	(Colombia) Juan Sebastián Cabal; 6–4, 7–6^{(7–3)}	(Colombia) Robert Farah	(Argentina) Eduardo Schwank (Italy) Matteo Marrai	(Colombia) Eduardo Struvay (Argentina) Facundo Bagnis (Moldova) Roman Borvanov (Argentina) Máximo González
September 26	2011 Aguascalientes Open; Aguascalientes, Mexico; Regular series Clay – €50,000+H – 32S/32Q/16D; Singles – Doubles	(Mexico) Daniel Garza (Mexico) Santiago González; 6–4, 5–7, [11–9]	(Ecuador) Júlio César Campozano (Dominican Republic) Víctor Estrella	(Argentina) Eduardo Schwank (Italy) Matteo Marrai	(Colombia) Eduardo Struvay (Argentina) Facundo Bagnis (Moldova) Roman Borvanov (Argentina) Máximo González
September 26	2011 Recife Open Internacional de Tenis; Recife, Brazil; Regular series Hard – €50,000 – 32S/32Q/16D; Singles – Doubles	(Brazil) Ricardo Mello; 7–6^{(7–5)}, 6–3	(Brazil) Rogério Dutra da Silva	(Brazil) Caio Zampieri (Brazil) Júlio Silva	(Germany) Peter Gojowczyk (Germany) Denis Gremelmayr (Brazil) Rafael Camilo (Brazil) Marcelo Demoliner
September 26	2011 Recife Open Internacional de Tenis; Recife, Brazil; Regular series Hard – €50,000 – 32S/32Q/16D; Singles – Doubles	(Argentina) Guido Andreozzi (Uruguay) Marcel Felder; 6–3, 6–3	(Brazil) Rodrigo Grilli (Brazil) André Miele	(Brazil) Caio Zampieri (Brazil) Júlio Silva	(Germany) Peter Gojowczyk (Germany) Denis Gremelmayr (Brazil) Rafael Camilo (Brazil) Marcelo Demoliner
September 26	2011 Tennislife Cup; Naples, Italy; Regular series Clay – €42,500+H – 32S/32Q/16D; Singles – Doubles	(Argentina) Leonardo Mayer; 6–3, 6–4	(Italy) Alessandro Giannessi	(Germany) Andreas Beck (Romania) Adrian Ungur	(Italy) Gianluca Naso (Italy) Filippo Volandri (Croatia) Antonio Veić (Argentina) Carlos Berlocq
September 26	2011 Tennislife Cup; Naples, Italy; Regular series Clay – €42,500+H – 32S/32Q/16D; Singles – Doubles	(Kazakhstan) Yuri Schukin (Croatia) Antonio Veić; 6–7^{(5–7)}, 7–5, [10–8]	(Chinese Taipei) Hsieh Cheng-peng (Chinese Taipei) Lee Hsin-han	(Germany) Andreas Beck (Romania) Adrian Ungur	(Italy) Gianluca Naso (Italy) Filippo Volandri (Croatia) Antonio Veić (Argentina) Carlos Berlocq
September 26	2011 Torneo Omnia Tenis Ciudad Madrid; Madrid, Spain; Regular series Clay – €42,500 – 32S/32Q/16D; Singles – Doubles	(France) Jérémy Chardy; 6–1, 5–7, 7–6^{(7–3)}	(Spain) Daniel Gimeno Traver	(Portugal) Rui Machado (Spain) Rubén Ramírez Hidalgo	(Italy) Paolo Lorenzi (Spain) Guillermo Olaso (France) Éric Prodon (Spain) Iván Navarro
September 26	2011 Torneo Omnia Tenis Ciudad Madrid; Madrid, Spain; Regular series Clay – €42,500 – 32S/32Q/16D; Singles – Doubles	(Spain) David Marrero (Spain) Rubén Ramírez Hidalgo; 6–4, 6–7^{(8–10)}, [11–9]	(Spain) Daniel Gimeno Traver (United Kingdom) Morgan Phillips	(Portugal) Rui Machado (Spain) Rubén Ramírez Hidalgo	(Italy) Paolo Lorenzi (Spain) Guillermo Olaso (France) Éric Prodon (Spain) Iván Navarro

=== October ===
Week of	Tournament	Champions	Runners-up	Semifinalists	Quarterfinalists
October 3	2011 Ethias Trophy; Mons, Belgium; Regular series Hard – €106,500+H – 32S/32Q/16D; Singles – Doubles	(Italy) Andreas Seppi; 2–6, 6–3, 7–6^{(7–4)}	(France) Julien Benneteau	(Belgium) David Goffin (Lithuania) Ričardas Berankis	(Colombia) Alejandro Falla (Germany) Tobias Kamke (France) Nicolas Mahut (Belgium) Steve Darcis
October 3	2011 Ethias Trophy; Mons, Belgium; Regular series Hard – €106,500+H – 32S/32Q/16D; Singles – Doubles	(Sweden) Johan Brunström (United Kingdom) Ken Skupski; 7–6^{(7–4)}, 6–3	(France) Kenny de Schepper (France) Édouard Roger-Vasselin	(Belgium) David Goffin (Lithuania) Ričardas Berankis	(Colombia) Alejandro Falla (Germany) Tobias Kamke (France) Nicolas Mahut (Belgium) Steve Darcis
October 3	2011 Natomas Pro Men's Tennis Tournament; Sacramento, United States; Regular series Hard – €100,000 – 32S/32Q/16D; Singles – Doubles	(Croatia) Ivo Karlović; 6–4, 3–6, 6–4	(United States) James Blake	(United States) Alex Kuznetsov (United States) Sam Querrey	(United States) Jack Sock (United States) Bobby Reynolds (Belarus) Uladzimir Ignatik (Netherlands) Thiemo de Bakker
October 3	2011 Natomas Pro Men's Tennis Tournament; Sacramento, United States; Regular series Hard – €100,000 – 32S/32Q/16D; Singles – Doubles	(Australia) Carsten Ball (Australia) Chris Guccione; 7–6^{(7–3)}, 1–6, [10–5]	(United States) Nicholas Monroe (United States) Jack Sock	(United States) Alex Kuznetsov (United States) Sam Querrey	(United States) Jack Sock (United States) Bobby Reynolds (Belarus) Uladzimir Ignatik (Netherlands) Thiemo de Bakker
October 3	2011 Sicilia Classic; Palermo, Italy; Regular series Clay – €42,500+H – 32S/32Q/16D; Singles – Doubles	(Argentina) Carlos Berlocq; 6–1, 6–1	(Romania) Adrian Ungur	(Argentina) Diego Junqueira (Germany) Andreas Beck	(Slovakia) Pavol Červenák (Portugal) Frederico Gil (Slovenia) Blaž Kavčič (Croatia) Antonio Veić
October 3	2011 Sicilia Classic; Palermo, Italy; Regular series Clay – €42,500+H – 32S/32Q/16D; Singles – Doubles	(Poland) Tomasz Bednarek (Poland) Mateusz Kowalczyk; 6–2, 6–4	(Belarus) Aliaksandr Bury (Belarus) Andrei Vasilevski	(Argentina) Diego Junqueira (Germany) Andreas Beck	(Slovakia) Pavol Červenák (Portugal) Frederico Gil (Slovenia) Blaž Kavčič (Croatia) Antonio Veić
October 10	2011 Royal Bank of Scotland Challenger; Tiburon, United States; Regular series Hard – €100,000 – 32S/32Q/16D; Singles – Doubles	(Croatia) Ivo Karlović; 6–7^{(2–7)}, 6–1, 6–4	(United States) Sam Querrey	(United States) Ryan Sweeting (Germany) Björn Phau	(Canada) Vasek Pospisil (United States) Alex Kuznetsov (Lithuania) Laurynas Grigelis (Austria) Martin Fischer
October 10	2011 Royal Bank of Scotland Challenger; Tiburon, United States; Regular series Hard – €100,000 – 32S/32Q/16D; Singles – Doubles	(Australia) Carsten Ball (Australia) Chris Guccione; 6–1, 5–7, [10–6]	(United States) Steve Johnson (United States) Sam Querrey	(United States) Ryan Sweeting (Germany) Björn Phau	(Canada) Vasek Pospisil (United States) Alex Kuznetsov (Lithuania) Laurynas Grigelis (Austria) Martin Fischer
October 10	2011 Open de Rennes; Rennes, France; Regular series Hard – €64,000+H – 32S/32Q/16D; Singles – Doubles	(France) Julien Benneteau; 6–4, 6–3	(Belgium) Olivier Rochus	(France) Édouard Roger-Vasselin (Spain) Roberto Bautista Agut	(Luxembourg) Gilles Müller (Belgium) Ruben Bemelmans (Tunisia) Malek Jaziri (France) Nicolas Mahut
October 10	2011 Open de Rennes; Rennes, France; Regular series Hard – €64,000+H – 32S/32Q/16D; Singles – Doubles	(Germany) Martin Emmrich (Sweden) Andreas Siljeström; 6–4, 6–4	(France) Kenny de Schepper (France) Édouard Roger-Vasselin	(France) Édouard Roger-Vasselin (Spain) Roberto Bautista Agut	(Luxembourg) Gilles Müller (Belgium) Ruben Bemelmans (Tunisia) Malek Jaziri (France) Nicolas Mahut
October 17	2011 Open d'Orléans; Orléans, France; Regular series Hard – €106,500+H – 32S/32Q/16D; Singles – Doubles	(France) Michaël Llodra; 7–5, 6–1	(France) Arnaud Clément	(Lithuania) Ričardas Berankis (Germany) Andreas Beck	(Spain) Adrián Menéndez (France) Augustin Gensse (Germany) Dustin Brown (France) Mathieu Rodrigues
October 17	2011 Open d'Orléans; Orléans, France; Regular series Hard – €106,500+H – 32S/32Q/16D; Singles – Doubles	(France) Pierre-Hugues Herbert (France) Nicolas Renavand; 7–5, 6–3	(Czech Republic) David Škoch (Italy) Simone Vagnozzi	(Lithuania) Ričardas Berankis (Germany) Andreas Beck	(Spain) Adrián Menéndez (France) Augustin Gensse (Germany) Dustin Brown (France) Mathieu Rodrigues
October 17	2011 Samsung Securities Cup; Seoul, South Korea; Regular series Hard – €100,000+H – 32S/32Q/16D; Singles – Doubles	(Chinese Taipei) Lu Yen-hsun; 7–5, 6–3	(Chinese Taipei) Jimmy Wang	(Switzerland) Stéphane Bohli (Bosnia and Herzegovina) Amer Delić	(South Africa) Rik de Voest (Switzerland) Marco Chiudinelli (Chinese Taipei) Tsung-hua Yang (South Korea) Chung Hong
October 17	2011 Samsung Securities Cup; Seoul, South Korea; Regular series Hard – €100,000+H – 32S/32Q/16D; Singles – Doubles	(Thailand) Sanchai Ratiwatana (Thailand) Sonchat Ratiwatana; 6–4, 7–6^{(7–3)}	(India) Purav Raja (India) Divij Sharan	(Switzerland) Stéphane Bohli (Bosnia and Herzegovina) Amer Delić	(South Africa) Rik de Voest (Switzerland) Marco Chiudinelli (Chinese Taipei) Tsung-hua Yang (South Korea) Chung Hong
October 17	2011 Cerveza Club Premium Open; Quito, Ecuador; Regular series Clay – €35,000+H – 32S/32Q/16D; Singles – Doubles	(Argentina) Sebastián Decoud; 6–3, 7–6^{(7–3)}	(Spain) Daniel Muñoz de la Nava	(Germany) Andre Begemann (Spain) Rubén Ramírez Hidalgo	(Argentina) Facundo Bagnis (Colombia) Carlos Salamanca (France) Guillaume Rufin (Monaco) Benjamin Balleret
October 17	2011 Cerveza Club Premium Open; Quito, Ecuador; Regular series Clay – €35,000+H – 32S/32Q/16D; Singles – Doubles	(Colombia) Juan Sebastián Gómez (United States) Maciek Sykut; 3–6, 7–5, [10–8]	(Germany) Andre Begemann (South Africa) Izak van der Merwe	(Germany) Andre Begemann (Spain) Rubén Ramírez Hidalgo	(Argentina) Facundo Bagnis (Colombia) Carlos Salamanca (France) Guillaume Rufin (Monaco) Benjamin Balleret
October 24	2011 BVA Open; São José do Rio Preto, Brazil; Regular series Clay – €50,000+H – 32S/32Q/16D; Singles – Doubles	(Brazil) Ricardo Mello; 6–4, 6–2	(Argentina) Eduardo Schwank	(Portugal) Rui Machado (Brazil) Thiago Alves	(Argentina) Martín Alund (Italy) Gianluca Naso (Argentina) Pablo Galdón (Spain) Rubén Ramírez Hidalgo
October 24	2011 BVA Open; São José do Rio Preto, Brazil; Regular series Clay – €50,000+H – 32S/32Q/16D; Singles – Doubles	(Portugal) Frederico Gil (Czech Republic) Jaroslav Pospíšil; 6–4, 6–4	(Brazil) Franco Ferreiro (Spain) Rubén Ramírez Hidalgo	(Portugal) Rui Machado (Brazil) Thiago Alves	(Argentina) Martín Alund (Italy) Gianluca Naso (Argentina) Pablo Galdón (Spain) Rubén Ramírez Hidalgo
October 31	2011 Virginia National Bank Men's Pro Championship; Charlottesville, United States; Regular series Hard – €50,000 – 32S/32Q/16D; Singles – Doubles	(South Africa) Izak van der Merwe; 4–6, 6–3, 6–4	(United States) Jesse Levine	(United States) Denis Kudla (Finland) Harri Heliövaara	(United Kingdom) Alex Bogdanovic (United States) Bobby Reynolds (France) Vincent Millot (United States) Michael Russell
October 31	2011 Virginia National Bank Men's Pro Championship; Charlottesville, United States; Regular series Hard – €50,000 – 32S/32Q/16D; Singles – Doubles	(Philippines) Treat Conrad Huey (United Kingdom) Dominic Inglot; 6–4, 3–6, [10–7]	(United States) John Paul Fruttero (South Africa) Raven Klaasen	(United States) Denis Kudla (Finland) Harri Heliövaara	(United Kingdom) Alex Bogdanovic (United States) Bobby Reynolds (France) Vincent Millot (United States) Michael Russell
October 31	2011 Seguros Bolívar Open Medellín; Medellín, Colombia; Regular series Clay – €50,000+H – 32S/32Q/16D; Singles – Doubles	(Dominican Republic) Víctor Estrella; 6–7^{(2–7)}, 6–4, 6–4	(Colombia) Alejandro Falla	(Chile) Paul Capdeville (Brazil) João Souza	(Argentina) Facundo Bagnis (Chile) Nicolás Massú (Colombia) Eduardo Struvay (France) Éric Prodon
October 31	2011 Seguros Bolívar Open Medellín; Medellín, Colombia; Regular series Clay – €50,000+H – 32S/32Q/16D; Singles – Doubles	(Chile) Paul Capdeville (Chile) Nicolás Massú; 6–2, 4–6, [10–8]	(Italy) Alessio di Mauro (Italy) Matteo Viola	(Chile) Paul Capdeville (Brazil) João Souza	(Argentina) Facundo Bagnis (Chile) Nicolás Massú (Colombia) Eduardo Struvay (France) Éric Prodon
October 31	2011 Bauer Watertechnology Cup; Eckental, Germany; Regular series €30,000+H – Synthetic – 32S/32Q/16D; Singles –Doubles	(United States) Rajeev Ram; 6–4, 6–2	(Slovakia) Karol Beck	(Germany) Daniel Brands (Germany) Andreas Beck	(Belgium) Ruben Bemelmans (Germany) Kevin Krawietz (Czech Republic) Jan Hernych (Germany) Dustin Brown
October 31	2011 Bauer Watertechnology Cup; Eckental, Germany; Regular series €30,000+H – Synthetic – 32S/32Q/16D; Singles –Doubles	(Germany) Andre Begemann (Russia) Alexander Kudryavtsev; 6–3, 3–6, [11–9]	(United States) James Cerretani (Canada) Adil Shamasdin	(Germany) Daniel Brands (Germany) Andreas Beck	(Belgium) Ruben Bemelmans (Germany) Kevin Krawietz (Czech Republic) Jan Hernych (Germany) Dustin Brown
October 31	2011 São Léo Open; São Leopoldo, Brazil; Regular series Clay – €35,000+H – 32S/32Q/16D; Singles – Doubles	(Argentina) Leonardo Mayer; 7–5, 7–6^{(7–1)}	(Serbia) Nikola Ćirić	(Portugal) Rui Machado (Argentina) Juan Pablo Brzezicki	(United States) Wayne Odesnik (Brazil) Ricardo Mello (Brazil) André Ghem (Spain) Rubén Ramírez Hidalgo
October 31	2011 São Léo Open; São Leopoldo, Brazil; Regular series Clay – €35,000+H – 32S/32Q/16D; Singles – Doubles	(Brazil) Franco Ferreiro (Spain) Rubén Ramírez Hidalgo; 6–7^{(4–7)}, 6–3, [11–9]	(Portugal) Gastão Elias (Portugal) Frederico Gil	(Portugal) Rui Machado (Argentina) Juan Pablo Brzezicki	(United States) Wayne Odesnik (Brazil) Ricardo Mello (Brazil) André Ghem (Spain) Rubén Ramírez Hidalgo

=== November ===
Week of	Tournament	Champions	Runners-up	Semifinalists	Quarterfinalists
November 7	2011 Copa Topper; Buenos Aires, Argentina; Regular series Clay – €75,000 – 32S/32Q/16D; Singles – Doubles	(Argentina) Carlos Berlocq; 6–1, 7–6^{(7–3)}	(Portugal) Gastão Elias	(Argentina) Máximo González (Brazil) Júlio Silva	(Argentina) Facundo Bagnis (Argentina) Diego Junqueira (Portugal) Frederico Gil (United States) Wayne Odesnik
November 7	2011 Copa Topper; Buenos Aires, Argentina; Regular series Clay – €75,000 – 32S/32Q/16D; Singles – Doubles	(Argentina) Carlos Berlocq (Argentina) Eduardo Schwank; 6–7^{(1–7)}, 6–4, [10–7]	(Uruguay) Marcel Felder (Czech Republic) Jaroslav Pospíšil	(Argentina) Máximo González (Brazil) Júlio Silva	(Argentina) Facundo Bagnis (Argentina) Diego Junqueira (Portugal) Frederico Gil (United States) Wayne Odesnik
November 7	2011 Internazionali Tennis Val Gardena Südtirol; Urtijëi, Italy; Regular series €64,000+H – Synthetic – 32S/32Q/16D; Singles – Doubles	(United States) Rajeev Ram; 7–5, 3–6, 7–6^{(8–6)}	(Czech Republic) Jan Hernych	(Germany) Philipp Petzschner (Russia) Konstantin Kravchuk	(Germany) Benjamin Becker (Argentina) Federico Delbonis (Germany) Marcel Zimmermann (Belgium) Ruben Bemelmans
November 7	2011 Internazionali Tennis Val Gardena Südtirol; Urtijëi, Italy; Regular series €64,000+H – Synthetic – 32S/32Q/16D; Singles – Doubles	(Germany) Dustin Brown (Croatia) Lovro Zovko; 6–4, 7–6^{(7–4)}	(Germany) Philipp Petzschner (Germany) Alexander Waske	(Germany) Philipp Petzschner (Russia) Konstantin Kravchuk	(Germany) Benjamin Becker (Argentina) Federico Delbonis (Germany) Marcel Zimmermann (Belgium) Ruben Bemelmans
November 7	2011 Knoxville Challenger; Knoxville, United States; Regular series Clay – €50,000 – 32S/32Q/16D; Singles – Doubles	(United States) Jesse Levine; 6–2, 6–3	(United States) Brian Baker	(United Kingdom) Jamie Baker (Bosnia and Herzegovina) Mirza Bašić	(United States) Michael Russell (Belarus) Uladzimir Ignatik (Canada) Vasek Pospisil (Finland) Harri Heliövaara
November 7	2011 Knoxville Challenger; Knoxville, United States; Regular series Clay – €50,000 – 32S/32Q/16D; Singles – Doubles	(United States) Steve Johnson (United States) Austin Krajicek; 3–6, 6–4, [13–11]	(Australia) Adam Hubble (Denmark) Frederik Nielsen	(United Kingdom) Jamie Baker (Bosnia and Herzegovina) Mirza Bašić	(United States) Michael Russell (Belarus) Uladzimir Ignatik (Canada) Vasek Pospisil (Finland) Harri Heliövaara
November 7	2011 IPP Trophy; Geneva, Switzerland; Regular series Hard – €64,000+H – 32S/32Q/16D; Singles – Doubles	(Tunisia) Malek Jaziri; 4–6, 6–3, 6–3	(Germany) Mischa Zverev	(Lithuania) Ričardas Berankis (Belgium) Steve Darcis	(Switzerland) Marco Chiudinelli (Belgium) David Goffin (Argentina) Horacio Zeballos (Switzerland) Stéphane Bohli
November 7	2011 IPP Trophy; Geneva, Switzerland; Regular series Hard – €64,000+H – 32S/32Q/16D; Singles – Doubles	(Russia) Igor Andreev (Russia) Evgeny Donskoy; 7–6^{(7–1)}, 7–6^{(7–2)}	(United States) James Cerretani (Canada) Adil Shamasdin	(Lithuania) Ričardas Berankis (Belgium) Steve Darcis	(Switzerland) Marco Chiudinelli (Belgium) David Goffin (Argentina) Horacio Zeballos (Switzerland) Stéphane Bohli
November 7	2011 Aegon Pro-Series Loughborough; Loughborough, Great Britain; Regular series Hard – €42,500 – 32S/32Q/16D; Singles – Doubles	(Germany) Tobias Kamke; 6–2, 7–5	(Italy) Flavio Cipolla	(Slovenia) Aljaž Bedene (Germany) Peter Torebko	(Austria) Andreas Haider-Maurer (Germany) Andreas Beck (Japan) Go Soeda (Germany) Andre Begemann
November 7	2011 Aegon Pro-Series Loughborough; Loughborough, Great Britain; Regular series Hard – €42,500 – 32S/32Q/16D; Singles – Doubles	(United Kingdom) Jamie Delgado (United Kingdom) Jonathan Marray; 6–2, 6–2	(Republic of Ireland) Sam Barry (Republic of Ireland) Daniel Glancy	(Slovenia) Aljaž Bedene (Germany) Peter Torebko	(Austria) Andreas Haider-Maurer (Germany) Andreas Beck (Japan) Go Soeda (Germany) Andre Begemann
November 14	2011 ATP Challenger Tour Finals; São Paulo, Brazil; Regular series Hard – €220,000+H – 8S; Singles	(Germany) Cedrik-Marcel Stebe; 6–2, 6–4	(Israel) Dudi Sela	(Germany) Andreas Beck (Brazil) Thomaz Bellucci	Round Robin losers (Portugal) Rui Machado (Slovakia) Martin Kližan (Germany) Matthias Bachinger (United States) Bobby Reynolds
November 14	2011 Slovak Open; Bratislava, Slovakia; Regular series Hard – €85,000+H – 32S/32Q/16D; Singles – Doubles	(Slovakia) Lukáš Lacko; 7–6^{(9–7)}, 6–2	(Lithuania) Ričardas Berankis	(Canada) Frank Dancevic (Czech Republic) Lukáš Rosol	(Germany) Michael Berrer (Czech Republic) Jan Minář (France) Adrian Mannarino (Ukraine) Sergiy Stakhovsky
November 14	2011 Slovak Open; Bratislava, Slovakia; Regular series Hard – €85,000+H – 32S/32Q/16D; Singles – Doubles	(Czech Republic) Jan Hájek (Slovakia) Lukáš Lacko; 7–5, 7–5	(Czech Republic) Lukáš Rosol (Czech Republic) David Škoch	(Canada) Frank Dancevic (Czech Republic) Lukáš Rosol	(Germany) Michael Berrer (Czech Republic) Jan Minář (France) Adrian Mannarino (Ukraine) Sergiy Stakhovsky
November 14	2011 ATP Salzburg Indoors; Salzburg, Austria; Regular series Hard – €42,500 – 32S/32Q/16D; Singles – Doubles	(France) Benoît Paire; 6–7^{(6–8)}, 6–4, 6–4	(Slovenia) Grega Žemlja	(Slovakia) Karol Beck (Austria) Andreas Haider-Maurer	(Austria) Martin Fischer (Germany) Björn Phau (Germany) Peter Gojowczyk (France) Nicolas Mahut
November 14	2011 ATP Salzburg Indoors; Salzburg, Austria; Regular series Hard – €42,500 – 32S/32Q/16D; Singles – Doubles	(Austria) Martin Fischer (Austria) Philipp Oswald; 6–3, 3–6, [14–12]	(Germany) Alexander Waske (Croatia) Lovro Zovko	(Slovakia) Karol Beck (Austria) Andreas Haider-Maurer	(Austria) Martin Fischer (Germany) Björn Phau (Germany) Peter Gojowczyk (France) Nicolas Mahut
November 14	2011 JSM Challenger of Champaign–Urbana; Champaign, United States; Regular series Hard – €50,000 – 32S/32Q/16D; Singles – Doubles	(United States) Alex Kuznetsov; 6–1, 6–3	(South Africa) Rik de Voest	(United States) Michael Russell (Canada) Peter Polansky	(Bosnia and Herzegovina) Amer Delić (Finland) Harri Heliövaara (Australia) John-Patrick Smith (Australia) Chris Guccione
November 14	2011 JSM Challenger of Champaign–Urbana; Champaign, United States; Regular series Hard – €50,000 – 32S/32Q/16D; Singles – Doubles	(South Africa) Rik de Voest (South Africa) Izak van der Merwe; 2–6, 6–3, [10–4]	(Germany) Martin Emmrich (Sweden) Andreas Siljeström	(United States) Michael Russell (Canada) Peter Polansky	(Bosnia and Herzegovina) Amer Delić (Finland) Harri Heliövaara (Australia) John-Patrick Smith (Australia) Chris Guccione
November 14	2011 Copa Petrobras Montevideo; Montevideo, Uruguay; Regular series Clay – €50,000 – 32S/32Q/16D; Singles – Doubles	(Argentina) Carlos Berlocq; 6–2, 7–5	(Argentina) Máximo González	(Italy) Alessandro Giannessi (Argentina) Leonardo Mayer	(Argentina) Facundo Bagnis (Brazil) João Souza (Russia) Andrey Kuznetsov (Brazil) Rogério Dutra da Silva
November 14	2011 Copa Petrobras Montevideo; Montevideo, Uruguay; Regular series Clay – €50,000 – 32S/32Q/16D; Singles – Doubles	(Serbia) Nikola Ćirić (Montenegro) Goran Tošić; 7–6^{(7–5)}, 7–6^{(7–4)}	(Uruguay) Marcel Felder (Argentina) Diego Schwartzman	(Italy) Alessandro Giannessi (Argentina) Leonardo Mayer	(Argentina) Facundo Bagnis (Brazil) João Souza (Russia) Andrey Kuznetsov (Brazil) Rogério Dutra da Silva
November 21	2011 IPP Open; Helsinki, Finland; Regular series Hard – €106,500+H – 32S/32Q/16D; Singles – Doubles	(Germany) Daniel Brands; 7–6^{(7–2)}, 7–6^{(7–5)}	(Germany) Matthias Bachinger	(Canada) Frank Dancevic (Germany) Dustin Brown	(Poland) Michał Przysiężny (Estonia) Jürgen Zopp (Russia) Mikhail Elgin (Germany) Michael Berrer
November 21	2011 IPP Open; Helsinki, Finland; Regular series Hard – €106,500+H – 32S/32Q/16D; Singles – Doubles	(Germany) Martin Emmrich (Sweden) Andreas Siljeström; 6–4, 6–4	(United States) James Cerretani (Slovakia) Michal Mertiňák	(Canada) Frank Dancevic (Germany) Dustin Brown	(Poland) Michał Przysiężny (Estonia) Jürgen Zopp (Russia) Mikhail Elgin (Germany) Michael Berrer
November 21	2011 Challenger Ciudad de Guayaquil; Guayaquil, Ecuador; Regular series Clay – €50,000+H – 32S/32Q/16D; Singles – Doubles	(Italy) Matteo Viola; 6–4, 6–1	(Argentina) Guido Pella	(Spain) Rubén Ramírez Hidalgo (Portugal) Pedro Sousa	(Slovakia) Pavol Červenák (United States) Wayne Odesnik (Argentina) Andrés Molteni (Argentina) Pablo Galdón
November 21	2011 Challenger Ciudad de Guayaquil; Guayaquil, Ecuador; Regular series Clay – €50,000+H – 32S/32Q/16D; Singles – Doubles	(Ecuador) Júlio César Campozano (Ecuador) Roberto Quiroz; 6–4, 6–1	(Uruguay) Marcel Felder (Brazil) Rodrigo Grilli	(Spain) Rubén Ramírez Hidalgo (Portugal) Pedro Sousa	(Slovakia) Pavol Červenák (United States) Wayne Odesnik (Argentina) Andrés Molteni (Argentina) Pablo Galdón
November 21	2011 Dunlop World Challenge; Toyota, Japan; Regular series €35,000+H – Synthetic – 32S/32Q/16D; Singles – Doubles	(Japan) Tatsuma Ito; 6–4, 6–2	(Germany) Sebastian Rieschick	(Japan) Yūichi Sugita (Japan) Takao Suzuki	(Japan) Go Soeda (India) Yuki Bhambri (Japan) Toshihide Matsui (Japan) Yasutaka Uchiyama
November 21	2011 Dunlop World Challenge; Toyota, Japan; Regular series €35,000+H – Synthetic – 32S/32Q/16D; Singles – Doubles	(Japan) Hiroki Kondo (Chinese Taipei) Yi Chu-huan; 6–4, 6–1	(China) Gao Peng (China) Gao Wan	(Japan) Yūichi Sugita (Japan) Takao Suzuki	(Japan) Go Soeda (India) Yuki Bhambri (Japan) Toshihide Matsui (Japan) Yasutaka Uchiyama

== Statistical information ==
These tables present the number of singles (S) and doubles (D) titles won by each player and each nation during the season, within all the tournament categories of the 2011 ATP Challenger Tour: the Tretorn SERIE+ tournaments, and the regular series tournaments. The players/nations are sorted by: 1) total number of titles (a doubles title won by two players representing the same nation counts as only one win for the nation); 2) cumulated importance of those titles (one Tretorn SERIE+ win > one regular tournament win); 3) a singles > doubles hierarchy; 4) alphabetical order (by family names for players).

To avoid confusion and double counting, these tables should be updated only after an event is completed.

=== Titles won by player ===
Total	Player	Tretorn SERIE+		Regular series		Total	
Total	Player	S	D	S	D	S	D
7	Bobby Reynolds (USA)			● ●	● ● ● ● ●	2	5
7	Treat Conrad Huey (PHI)				● ● ● ● ● ● ●	0	7
7	Juan Sebastián Cabal (COL)			●	● ● ● ● ● ●	1	6
6	Izak van der Merwe (RSA)			● ●	● ● ● ●	2	4
6	Alexandre Kudryavtsev (RUS)		●		● ● ● ● ●	0	6
6	Jamie Delgado (GBR)				● ● ● ● ●	0	6
6	Robert Farah (COL)				● ● ● ● ● ●	0	6
5	Michail Elgin (RUS)		●		● ● ● ●	0	5
5	Frederik Nielsen (DEN)		●		● ● ● ●	0	5
5	Carlos Berlocq (ARG)	●		● ● ●	●	4	1
5	Rubén Ramírez Hidalgo (ESP)				● ● ● ● ●	0	5
5	Jonathan Marray (GBR)				● ● ● ● ●	0	5
5	Simone Vagnozzi (ITA)				● ● ● ● ●	0	5
4	Rui Machado (POR)	● ●		● ●		4	0
4	Denis Istomin (UZB)			● ● ● ●		4	0
4	Stéphane Robert (FRA)		●	●	● ●	1	3
4	Paolo Lorenzi (ITA)			● ●	● ●	2	2
4	Rajeev Ram (USA)			● ●	● ●	2	2
4	Édouard Roger-Vasselin (FRA)			● ●	● ●	2	2
4	Lukáš Rosol (CZE)			● ●	● ●	2	2
4	Dominik Meffert (GER)			●	● ● ●	1	3
4	Martin Fischer (AUT)		● ●		● ●	0	4
4	Philipp Oswald (AUT)		● ●		● ●	0	4
4	Carsten Ball (AUS)				● ● ● ●	0	4
4	Franco Ferreiro (BRA)				● ● ● ●	0	4
4	Andreas Siljeström (SWE)				● ● ● ●	0	4
4	Simon Stadler (GER)				● ● ● ●	0	4
3	Éric Prodon (FRA)	●		● ●		3	0
3	Daniel Muñoz de la Nava (ESP)	●			● ●	1	2
3	Leonardo Mayer (ARG)			● ● ●		3	0
3	Ricardo Mello (BRA)			● ● ●		3	0
3	Dudi Sela (ISR)			● ● ●		3	0
3	Cedrik-Marcel Stebe (GER)			● ● ●		3	0
3	Lukáš Lacko (SVK)	●	●	●		2	1
3	Paul Capdeville (CHI)			● ● ●		2	1
3	Máximo González (ARG)			● ●	●	2	1
3	Jaroslav Pospíšil (CZE)			●	● ●	1	2
3	Johan Brunström (SWE)		● ●		●	0	3
3	Ken Skupski (GBR)		●		● ●	0	3
3	Dustin Brown (GER)				● ● ●	0	3
3	Federico Delbonis (ARG)				● ● ●	0	3
3	Rik de Voest (RSA)				● ● ●	0	3
3	Martin Emmrich (GER)				● ● ●	0	3
3	Marcel Felder (URU)				● ● ●	0	3
3	Chris Guccione (AUS)				● ● ●	0	3
3	Pierre-Hugues Herbert (FRA)				● ● ●	0	3
3	Scott Lipsky (USA)				● ● ●	0	3
3	David Martin (USA)				● ● ●	0	3
3	Adrián Menéndez (ESP)				● ● ●	0	3
3	Alessandro Motti (ITA)				● ● ●	0	3
3	Vasek Pospisil (CAN)				● ● ●	0	3
3	Sanchai Ratiwatana (THA)				● ● ●	0	3
3	Sonchat Ratiwatana (THA)				● ● ●	0	3
3	Travis Rettenmaier (USA)				● ● ●	0	3
3	André Sá (BRA)				● ● ●	0	3
3	Horacio Zeballos (ARG)				● ● ●	0	3
2	Steve Darcis (BEL)	●		●		2	0
2	Benoît Paire (FRA)	●		●		2	0
2	Andreas Seppi (ITA)	●		●		2	0
2	Karol Beck (SVK)	●			●	1	1
2	James Blake (USA)			● ●		2	0
2	Daniel Brands (GER)			● ●		1	0
2	Pablo Carreño Busta (ESP)			● ●		2	0
2	Tatsuma Ito (JPN)			● ●		2	0
2	Ivo Karlović (CRO)			● ●		2	0
2	Lu Yen-hsun (TPE)			● ●		2	0
2	Wayne Odesnik (USA)			● ●		2	0
2	Albert Ramos (ESP)			● ●		2	0
2	Thomas Schoorel (NED)			● ●		2	0
2	Go Soeda (JPN)			● ●		2	0
2	Dmitry Tursunov (RUS)			● ●		2	0
2	Adrian Ungur (ROU)			● ●		2	0
2	James Cerretani (USA)		●		●	0	2
2	Olivier Charroin (FRA)		●		●	0	2
2	Colin Ebelthite (AUS)		●		●	0	2
2	Julian Knowle (AUT)		●		●	0	2
2	Michael Kohlmann (GER)		●		●	0	2
2	Matthias Bachinger (GER)			●	●	1	1
2	Facundo Bagnis (ARG)			●	●	1	1
2	Aljaž Bedene (SVN)			●	●	1	1
2	Arnau Brugués Davi (ESP)			●	●	1	1
2	Flavio Cipolla (ITA)			●	●	1	1
2	Brian Dabul (ARG)			●	●	1	1
2	Evgeny Donskoy (RUS)			●	●	1	1
2	Marc Gicquel (FRA)			●	●	1	1
2	Simon Greul (GER)			●	●	1	1
2	David Guez (FRA)			●	●	1	1
2	Ryan Harrison (USA)			●	●	1	1
2	Malek Jaziri (TUN)			●	●	1	1
2	Martin Kližan (SVK)			●	●	1	1
2	Bastian Knittel (GER)			●	●	1	1
2	Giovanni Lapentti (ECU)			●	●	1	1
2	Nicolas Mahut (FRA)			●	●	1	1
2	Andrés Molteni (ARG)			●	●	1	1
2	Björn Phau (GER)			●	●	1	1
2	Yuri Schukin (KAZ)			●	●	1	1
2	Júlio Silva (BRA)			●	●	1	1
2	Grega Žemlja (SVN)			●	●	1	1
2	Guido Andreozzi (ARG)				● ●	0	2
2	Tomasz Bednarek (POL)				● ●	0	2
2	Andre Begemann (GER)				● ●	0	2
2	Alessio di Mauro (ITA)				● ●	0	2
2	Colin Fleming (GBR)				● ●	0	2
2	Riccardo Ghedin (ITA)				● ●	0	2
2	Stefano Ianni (ITA)				● ●	0	2
2	Denys Molchanov (UKR)				● ●	0	2
2	Karan Rastogi (IND)				● ●	0	2
2	Nicolas Renavand (FRA)				● ●	0	2
2	Eduardo Schwank (ARG)				● ●	0	2
2	Adil Shamasdin (CAN)				● ●	0	2
2	Igor Zelenay (SVK)				● ●	0	2
2	Lovro Zovko (CRO)				● ●	0	2
1	Marius Copil (ROU)	●				1	0
1	Kenny de Schepper (FRA)	●				1	0
1	Potito Starace (ITA)	●				1	0
1	Yves Allegro (SUI)		●			0	1
1	Andreas Beck (GER)		●			0	1
1	Adam Feeney (AUS)		●			0	1
1	Mariusz Fyrstenberg (POL)		●			0	1
1	Marcin Gawron (POL)		●			0	1
1	Jan Hájek (CZE)		●			0	1
1	Andriej Kapaś (POL)		●			0	1
1	Philipp Marx (GER)		●			0	1
1	Marcin Matkowski (POL)		●			0	1
1	José Acasuso (ARG)			●		1	0
1	Ruben Bemelmans (BEL)			●		1	0
1	Julien Benneteau (FRA)			●		1	0
1	Alex Bogomolov Jr. (USA)			●		1	0
1	Simone Bolelli (ITA)			●		1	0
1	Iñigo Cervantes-Huegun (ESP)			●		1	0
1	Jérémy Chardy (FRA)			●		1	0
1	Sebastián Decoud (ARG)			●		1	0
1	Amer Delić (BIH)			●		1	0
1	Grigor Dimitrov (BUL)			●		1	0
1	Farrukh Dustov (UZB)			●		1	0
1	Rogério Dutra da Silva (BRA)			●		1	0
1	Víctor Estrella (DOM)			●		1	0
1	Alejandro Falla (COL)			●		1	0
1	Laurynas Grigelis (LTU)			●		1	0
1	Uladzimir Ignatik (BLR)			●		1	0
1	Daniel Gimeno Traver (ESP)			●		1	0
1	Andreas Haider-Maurer (AUT)			●		1	0
1	Diego Junqueira (ARG)			●		1	0
1	Jesse Levine (USA)			●		1	0
1	Feliciano López (ESP)			●		1	0
1	Tobias Kamke (GER)			●		1	0
1	Blaž Kavčič (SVN)			●		1	0
1	Mikhail Kukushkin (KAZ)			●		1	0
1	Alex Kuznetsov (USA)			●		1	0
1	Michaël Llodra (FRA)			●		1	0
1	Fabrice Martin (FRA)			●		1	0
1	Vincent Millot (FRA)			●		1	0
1	Ivo Minář (CZE)			●		1	0
1	Gilles Müller (LUX)			●		1	0
1	Julian Reister (GER)			●		1	0
1	Olivier Rochus (BEL)			●		1	0
1	Rainer Schüttler (GER)			●		1	0
1	Igor Sijsling (NED)			●		1	0
1	João Sousa (POR)			●		1	0
1	João Souza (BRA)			●		1	0
1	Maxime Teixeira (FRA)			●		1	0
1	Matteo Viola (ITA)			●		1	0
1	Filippo Volandri (ITA)			●		1	0
1	James Ward (GBR)			●		1	0
1	Fritz Wolmarans (RSA)			●		1	0
1	Donald Young (USA)			●		1	0
1	Jorge Aguilar (CHI)				●	0	1
1	Guillermo Alcaide (ESP)				●	0	1
1	Victor Anagnastopol (ROU)				●	0	1
1	Igor Andreev (RUS)				●	0	1
1	Philip Bester (CAN)				●	0	1
1	Daniele Bracciali (ITA)				●	0	1
1	Sergei Bubka (UKR)				●	0	1
1	Júlio César Campozano (ECU)				●	0	1
1	Marco Crugnola (ITA)				●	0	1
1	František Čermák (CZE)				●	0	1
1	Nikola Ćirić (SRB)				●	0	1
1	Jonathan Dasnières de Veigy (FRA)				●	0	1
1	Thiemo de Bakker (NED)				●	0	1
1	Pierre-Ludovic Duclos (CAN)				●	0	1
1	Matthew Ebden (AUS)				●	0	1
1	Ashley Fisher (AUS)				●	0	1
1	John Paul Fruttero (USA)				●	0	1
1	Daniel Garza (MEX)				●	0	1
1	Frederico Gil (POR)				●	0	1
1	Juan Sebastián Gómez (COL)				●	0	1
1	Santiago González (MEX)				●	0	1
1	Samuel Groth (AUS)				●	0	1
1	Harri Heliövaara (FIN)				●	0	1
1	Stephen Huss (AUS)				●	0	1
1	Ross Hutchins (GBR)				●	0	1
1	Im Kyu-tae (KOR)				●	0	1
1	Dominic Inglot (GBR)				●	0	1
1	Steve Johnson (USA)				●	0	1
1	Rameez Junaid (AUS)				●	0	1
1	Jordan Kerr (AUS)				●	0	1
1	Mateusz Kowalczyk (POL)				●	0	1
1	Hiroki Kondo (JPN)				●	0	1
1	Raven Klaasen (RSA)				●	0	1
1	Austin Krajicek (USA)				●	0	1
1	Konstantin Kravchuk (RUS)				●	0	1
1	Lee Hsin-han (TPE)				●	0	1
1	Peter Luczak (AUS)				●	0	1
1	David Marrero (ESP)				●	0	1
1	Nicolás Massú (CHI)				●	0	1
1	Florin Mergea (ROU)				●	0	1
1	Frank Moser (GER)				●	0	1
1	Renzo Olivo (ARG)				●	0	1
1	Travis Parrott (USA)				●	0	1
1	Alexander Peya (AUT)				●	0	1
1	Peter Polansky (CAN)				●	0	1
1	Roberto Quiroz (ECU)				●	0	1
1	Purav Raja (IND)				●	0	1
1	Fernando Romboli (BRA)				●	0	1
1	Carlos Salamanca (COL)				●	0	1
1	Divij Sharan (IND)				●	0	1
1	Maciek Sykut (USA)				●	0	1
1	Goran Tošić (MNE)				●	0	1
1	Yang Tsung-hua (TPE)				●	0	1
1	Danai Udomchoke (THA)				●	0	1
1	Antal van der Duim (NED)				●	0	1
1	Luca Vanni (ITA)				●	0	1
1	Antonio Veić (CRO)				●	0	1
1	Vishnu Vardhan (IND)				●	0	1
1	Yi Chu-huan (TPE)				●	0	1
1	Caio Zampieri (BRA)				●	0	1

=== Titles won by nation ===
Total	Nation	Tretorn SERIE+		Regular series		Total	
Total	Nation	S	D	S	D	S	D
34	Germany (GER)		3	13	18	13	21
29	France (FRA)	2	3	16	8	18	11
28	United States (USA)		1	11	16	11	17
25	Argentina (ARG)	1		15	9	16	9
23	Italy (ITA)	2		6	15	8	15
18	Spain (ESP)	1		8	9	9	9
13	Brazil (BRA)			6	7	6	7
12	Great Britain (GBR)		1	1	10	1	11
12	Australia (AUS)		1		11	0	12
11	Russia (RUS)		1	3	5	3	8
10	Colombia (COL)			2	8	2	8
9	Czech Republic (CZE)			4	5	4	5
9	South Africa (RSA)			3	6	3	6
8	Slovakia (SVK)	2		2	4	4	4
8	Austria (AUT)		3	1	4	1	7
8	Canada (CAN)		1		7	0	8
7	Sweden (SWE)		2		5	0	7
7	Philippines (PHI)				7	0	7
6	Portugal (POR)	2		3	1	5	1
5	Uzbekistan (UZB)			5		5	0
5	Japan (JPN)			4	1	4	1
5	Chinese Taipei (TPE)			3	2	3	2
5	Croatia (CRO)			2	3	2	3
5	Denmark (DEN)		1		4	0	5
4	Belgium (BEL)	1		3		4	0
4	Netherlands (NED)			3	1	3	1
4	Romania (ROU)	1		2	1	3	1
4	Slovenia (SVN)			3	1	3	1
4	Chile (CHI)			2	2	2	2
4	Poland (POL)		2		2	0	4
4	Thailand (THA)				4	0	4
3	Israel (ISR)			3		3	0
3	Kazakhstan (KAZ)			2	1	2	1
3	Ecuador (ECU)			1	2	1	2
3	Ukraine (UKR)				3	0	3
3	India (IND)				3	0	3
3	Uruguay (URU)				3	0	3
2	Tunisia (TUN)			1	1	1	1
1	Switzerland (SUI)		1			0	1
1	Bosnia and Herzegovina (BIH)			1		1	0
1	Bulgaria (BUL)			1		1	0
1	Dominican Republic (DOM)			1		1	0
1	Lithuania (LTU)			1		1	0
1	Luxembourg (LUX)			1		1	0
1	Finland (FIN)				1	0	1
1	Mexico (MEX)				1	0	1
1	Montenegro (MNE)				1	0	1
1	Serbia (SRB)				1	0	1
1	South Korea (KOR)				1	0	1

== ATP Year-To-Date Challenger Rankings ==
YTD Challenger Rankings (ranking was closed as of 24 October 2011)
#	Player	Points	Tours
1	Rui Machado (POR)	511	14
2	Éric Prodon (FRA)	481	23
3	Martin Kližan (SVK)	415	17
4	Lukáš Rosol (CZE)	399	13
5	Andreas Beck (GER)	398	21
6	Matthias Bachinger (GER)	391	13
7	Denis Istomin (UZB)	385	4
8	Adrian Ungur (ROU)	385	20
9	Dudi Sela (ISR)	380	8
9	Stéphane Robert (FRA)	380	19
10	Bobby Reynolds (USA)	376	13
12	Cedrik-Marcel Stebe (GER)	361	13
13	Leonardo Mayer (ARG)	361	14
14	Horacio Zeballos (ARG)	353	17
15	Paolo Lorenzi (ITA)	351	21
16	Wayne Odesnik (USA)	334	12
17	Rogério Dutra da Silva (BRA)	334	19
18	Diego Junqueira (ARG)	332	18
19	Albert Ramos (ESP)	330	10
20	Steve Darcis (BEL)	322	15

== Point Distribution ==
Points are awarded as follows:

Tournament Category	W	F	SF (3rd/4th)	QF	R16	R32	Additional qualifying points
ATP Challenger Tour Finals	125^ 95^{m}	75^ 45^{m}	45^ 15^{m}	(15 for each round robin match win, +30 for a semifinal win, +50 for the final win)			
Challenger $125,000 +H	125	75	45	25	10		5
Challenger $125,000	110	65	40	20	9		5
Challenger $100,000	100	60	35	18	8		5
Challenger $75,000	90	55	33	17	8		5
Challenger $50,000	80	48	29	15	7		3
Challenger $35,000 +H	80	48	29	15	6		3
