= 2010 BMW Ljubljana Open – Singles =

Singles
- 2010 BMW Ljubljana Open

Final
- Champion: (Slovenia) Blaž Kavčič
- Runner-up: (Belgium) David Goffin
- Score: 6–2, 4–6, 7–5

Events
Singles	Doubles
← 2009 ·	BMW Ljubljana Open	· 2011 →

Paolo Lorenzi was the defending champion, but he was eliminated by Nikola Ćirić already in the first round.
Due to rain, the final was played on Sunday, 26 September at 11:00 local time. Blaž Kavčič won this match 6–2, 4–6, 7–5, against David Goffin.

== Seeds ==
1. (Italy) Paolo Lorenzi (first round)
2. (Slovenia) Grega Žemlja (first round)
3. (Slovenia) Blaž Kavčič (champion)
4. (Serbia) Ilija Bozoljac (first round)
5. (France) Éric Prodon (first round)
6. (Czech Republic) Ivo Minář (first round)
7. (Belgium) Christophe Rochus (first round)
8. (Russia) Andrey Kuznetsov (first round)

== Draw ==
=== Key ===
- Q = Qualifier
- WC = Wild card
- LL = Lucky loser
- Alt = Alternate
- SE = Special exempt
- PR = Protected ranking
- ITF = ITF entry
- JE = Junior exempt
- w/o = Walkover
- r = Retired
- d = Defaulted
- SR = Special ranking

=== Finals ===
Semifinals
(Serbia) Nikola Ćirić	3	2
3	(Slovenia) Blaž Kavčič	6	6
(Belgium) David Goffin	6	6
(Italy) Alessio di Mauro	3	0

Final
3	(Slovenia) Blaž Kavčič	6	4	7
(Belgium) David Goffin	2	6	5

=== Top half ===
First round
1	(Italy) P Lorenzi	6	5	6^{4}
(Serbia) N Ćirić	3	7	7
WC	(Slovenia) T Žitnik	0	2
(Croatia) N Mektić	6	6
(Italy) S Galvani	7	6
Q	(Serbia) M Zekić	6^{1}	1
Q	(Serbia) B Pašanski	5	6	6
8	(Russia) A Kuznetsov	7	3	2
3	(Slovenia) B Kavčič	6	6
(Italy) M Trevisan	0	2
(Italy) M Viola	6	6
WC	(Slovenia) L Gregorc	3	3
SE	(Slovenia) J Semrajc	6	6
Q	(Serbia) I Bjelica	1	2
(France) J Dasnières de Veigy	6	7
7	(Belgium) C Rochus	0	5

Second round
(Serbia) N Ćirić	4	6	6
(Croatia) N Mektić	6	4	2
(Italy) S Galvani	7	2	6
Q	(Serbia) B Pašanski	6^{3}	6	2
3	(Slovenia) B Kavčič	6	6
(Italy) M Viola	2	4
SE	(Slovenia) J Semrajc	6	7	1
(France) J Dasnières de Veigy	2	5	6

Quarterfinals
(Serbia) N Ćirić	6	7
(Italy) S Galvani	1	5
3	(Slovenia) B Kavčič	6	6
(France) J Dasnières de Veigy	2	2

Semifinals
(Serbia) N Ćirić	3	2
3	(Slovenia) B Kavčič	6	6

=== Bottom half ===
First round
5	(France) É Prodon	1	7	3
(Belgium) D Goffin	6	6^{5}	6
(Spain) P Santos	6	6
(Italy) D Giorgini	4	2
(Italy) A Arnaboldi	6	6
(Italy) F Aldi	0	2
(Spain) G Trujillo Soler	6	6
4	(Serbia) I Bozoljac	3	0
6	(Czech Republic) I Minář	3	7	6^{4}
(France) A Gensse	6	5	7
(Spain) A Menéndez Maceiras	5	6	1
Q	(Norway) E Tveit	7	0	6
WC	(Slovenia) B Puc	3	1
WC	(Austria) T Muster	6	6
(Italy) A di Mauro	6	3	7
2	(Slovenia) G Žemlja	4	6	6^{2}

Second round
(Belgium) D Goffin	6	5	6
(Spain) P Santos	4	7	4
(Italy) A Arnaboldi	7	6
(Spain) G Trujillo Soler	6^{2}	4
(France) A Gensse	6	6
Q	(Norway) E Tveit	1	3
WC	(Austria) T Muster	3	2
(Italy) A di Mauro	6	6

Quarterfinals
(Belgium) D Goffin	6	6
(Italy) A Arnaboldi	3	1
(France) A Gensse	6	5	6^{5}
(Italy) A di Mauro	2	7	7

Semifinals
(Belgium) D Goffin	6	6
(Italy) A di Mauro	3	0
