= 2011 BMW Ljubljana Open =

- Date: 19–25 September
- Edition: 20th
- Location: Ljubljana, Slovenia

Champions

Singles
- (Italy) Paolo Lorenzi

Doubles
- (Slovenia) Aljaž Bedene / (Slovenia) Grega Žemlja
← 2010 ·	BMW Ljubljana Open	· 2012 →

The 2011 BMW Ljubljana Open was a professional tennis tournament played on clay courts. It was the 20th edition of the tournament which was part of the 2011 ATP Challenger Tour. It took place in Ljubljana, Slovenia between 19 and 25 September 2011.

== Singles main draw entrants ==
=== Seeds ===
Country	Player	Rank^{1}	Seed
SVN	Blaž Kavčič	98	1
ARG	Leonardo Mayer	119	2
SVN	Grega Žemlja	121	3
ITA	Paolo Lorenzi	135	4
ESP	Pablo Carreño Busta	141	5
SRB	Nikola Ćirić	160	6
CRO	Antonio Veić	163	7
CAN	Frank Dancevic	164	8

- ^{1} Rankings are as of September 12, 2011.

=== Other entrants ===
The following players received wildcards into the singles main draw:

- (Croatia) Toni Androić
- (Bosnia and Herzegovina) Tomislav Brkić
- (Slovenia) Tom Kočevar-Dešman
- (Slovenia) Tilen Žitnik

The following players received entry from the qualifying draw:

- (Bosnia and Herzegovina) Mirza Bašić
- (Italy) Daniele Giorgini
- (Croatia) Dino Marcan
- (Argentina) Diego Schwartzman

The following players received entry from a lucky loser spot:

- (Italy) Enrico Burzi

== Champions ==
=== Singles ===
(Italy) Paolo Lorenzi def. (Slovenia) Grega Žemlja, 6–2, 6–4

=== Doubles ===
(Slovenia) Aljaž Bedene / (Slovenia) Grega Žemlja def. (Spain) Roberto Bautista Agut / (Spain) Iván Navarro, 6–3, 6–7^{(10–12)}, [12–10]
