= 2011 BMW Ljubljana Open – Singles =

Singles
- 2011 BMW Ljubljana Open

Final
- Champion: (Italy) Paolo Lorenzi
- Runner-up: (Slovenia) Grega Žemlja
- Score: 6–2, 6–4

Events
Singles	Doubles
← 2010 ·	BMW Ljubljana Open	· 2012 →

Blaž Kavčič was the defending champion, but lost to his compatriot Aljaž Bedene in the second round.

Fourth seed Paolo Lorenzi won the title, defeating third seed Grega Žemlja 6–2, 6–4 in the final.

== Seeds ==
1. (Slovenia) Blaž Kavčič (second round)
2. (Argentina) Leonardo Mayer (quarterfinals)
3. (Slovenia) Grega Žemlja (final)
4. (Italy) Paolo Lorenzi (champion)
5. (Spain) Pablo Carreño Busta (second round)
6. (Serbia) Nikola Ćirić (first round)
7. (Croatia) Antonio Veić (first round)
8. (Canada) Frank Dancevic (quarterfinals)

== Draw ==
=== Key ===
- Q = Qualifier
- WC = Wild card
- LL = Lucky loser
- Alt = Alternate
- SE = Special exempt
- PR = Protected ranking
- ITF = ITF entry
- JE = Junior exempt
- w/o = Walkover
- r = Retired
- d = Defaulted
- SR = Special ranking

=== Finals ===
Semifinals
(Slovenia) Aljaž Bedene	1	5
3	(Slovenia) Grega Žemlja	6	7
4	(Italy) Paolo Lorenzi	7^{7}	6
(Germany) Daniel Brands	6^{3}	3

Final
3	(Slovenia) Grega Žemlja	2	4
4	(Italy) Paolo Lorenzi	6	6

=== Top half ===
First round
1	(Slovenia) B Kavčič	6	7^{7}
LL	(Italy) Enrico Burzi	4	6^{4}
Q	(Croatia) D Marcan	2	2
(Slovenia) A Bedene	6	6
(Croatia) K Mesaroš	6	4	2
(Spain) I Navarro	4	6	6
(Austria) M Fischer	6	3	6
7	(Croatia) A Veić	2	6	3
3	(Slovenia) G Žemlja	6	6
(Netherlands) M Middelkoop	1	3
(Serbia) M Zekić	6	3	6
(Serbia) D Lajović	1	6	3
(Spain) J Martí	5	6	6
(Argentina) F Argüello	7	0	2
(Italy) M Viola	5	1
5	(Spain) P Carreño Busta	7	6

Second round
1	(Slovenia) B Kavčič	6	3	3
(Slovenia) A Bedene	2	6	6
(Spain) I Navarro	2	6	6
(Austria) M Fischer	6	4	3
3	(Slovenia) G Žemlja	6	3	6
(Serbia) M Zekić	2	6	2
(Spain) J Martí	6	7^{7}
5	(Spain) P Carreño Busta	2	6^{1}

Quarterfinals
(Slovenia) A Bedene	7	6
(Spain) I Navarro	5	3
3	(Slovenia) G Žemlja	6	6
(Spain) J Martí	4	3

Semifinals
(Slovenia) A Bedene	1	5
3	(Slovenia) G Žemlja	6	7

=== Bottom half ===
First round
8	(Canada) F Dancevic	6	6
WC	(Croatia) T Androić	0	4
Q	(Italy) D Giorgini	5	6	6
WC	(Bosnia and Herzegovina) T Brkić	7	3	4
WC	(Slovenia) T Žitnik	0	2
(Italy) S Galvani	6	6
(Argentina) A Molteni	4	3
4	(Italy) P Lorenzi	6	6
6	(Serbia) N Ćirić	4	4
(Germany) D Brands	6	6
(Croatia) N Mektić	6	6
Q	(Argentina) Diego Schwartzman	0	4
(Spain) R Bautista Agut	6	2	6
Q	(Bosnia and Herzegovina) M Bašić	3	6	3
WC	(Slovenia) Tom Kočevar-Dešman	1	2
2	(Argentina) L Mayer	6	6

Second round
8	(Canada) F Dancevic	6	4	6
Q	(Italy) D Giorgini	1	6	1
(Italy) S Galvani	6^{1}	0
4	(Italy) P Lorenzi	7^{7}	6
(Germany) D Brands	6	6
(Croatia) N Mektić	4	4
(Spain) R Bautista Agut	6^{8}	5
2	(Argentina) L Mayer	7	7

Quarterfinals
8	(Canada) F Dancevic	3	0
4	(Italy) P Lorenzi	6	6
(Germany) D Brands	7^{7}	6
2	(Argentina) L Mayer	6^{5}	4

Semifinals
4	(Italy) P Lorenzi	7^{7}	6
(Germany) D Brands	6^{3}	3
