= 2011 BMW Ljubljana Open – Doubles =

Doubles
- 2011 BMW Ljubljana Open

Final
- Champions: (Slovenia) Aljaž Bedene (Slovenia) Grega Žemlja
- Runners-up: (Spain) Roberto Bautista-Agut (Spain) Ivan Navarro
- Score: 6–3, 6–7^{(10–12)}, [12–10]

Events
Singles	Doubles
← 2010 ·	BMW Ljubljana Open	· 2012 →

Nikola Mektić and Ivan Zovko were the defending champions, but decided not to participate.
Aljaž Bedene and Grega Žemlja won the title, defeating Roberto Bautista-Agut and Ivan Navarro 6–3, 6–7^{(10–12)}, [12–10] in the final.

== Seeds ==
1. (Argentina) Leonardo Mayer / (Argentina) Andrés Molteni (quarterfinals)
2. (Croatia) Toni Androić / (Serbia) Nikola Čačić (semifinals)
3. (Croatia) Marin Draganja / (Croatia) Dino Marcan (first round)
4. (Serbia) Nikola Ćirić / (Montenegro) Goran Tošić (semifinals)

== Draw ==
=== Key ===
- Q = Qualifier
- WC = Wild card
- LL = Lucky loser
- Alt = Alternate
- SE = Special exempt
- PR = Protected ranking
- ITF = ITF entry
- JE = Junior exempt
- w/o = Walkover
- r = Retired
- d = Defaulted
- SR = Special ranking

=== Draw ===
First round
1	(Argentina) L Mayer (Argentina) A Molteni	6	6
WC	(Slovenia) Matjaž Jurman (Slovenia) Domen Vertot	0	2
(Italy) S Galvani (Italy) D Giorgini	3	2
(Spain) R Bautista-Agut (Spain) I Navarro	6	6
4	(Serbia) N Ćirić (Montenegro) G Tošić	6	4	[10]
(Slovenia) Rok Jarc (Slovenia) Miha Mlakar	4	6	[5]
(Argentina) F Argüello (Argentina) Diego Schwartzman	2	2
(Spain) P Carreño Busta (Serbia) M Zekić	6	6
(Italy) E Burzi (Italy) M Viola
WC	(Slovenia) Tomislav Ternar (Slovenia) T Žitnik	w/o
(Slovenia) A Bedene (Slovenia) G Žemlja	4	6	[10]
3	(Croatia) M Draganja (Croatia) D Marcan	6	4	[7]
(Slovenia) Andrei Kraševec (Slovenia) Gregor Krusič	7^{7}	6
WC	(Slovenia) Janez Semrajc (Slovenia) Aleč Svigelj	6^{5}	0
(Slovenia) A Bedene (Slovenia) Tom Kočevar-Desman
2	(Croatia) T Androić (Serbia) N Čačić	w/o

Quarterfinals
1	(Argentina) L Mayer (Argentina) A Molteni	5	4
(Spain) R Bautista-Agut (Spain) I Navarro	7	6
4	(Serbia) N Ćirić (Montenegro) G Tošić	6	6
(Spain) P Carreño Busta (Serbia) M Zekić	1	4
WC	(Slovenia) Tomislav Ternar (Slovenia) T Žitnik	2	1
(Slovenia) A Bedene (Slovenia) G Žemlja	6	6
(Slovenia) Andrei Kraševec (Slovenia) Gregor Krusič	2	4
2	(Croatia) T Androić (Serbia) N Čačić	6	6

Semifinals
(Spain) R Bautista-Agut (Spain) I Navarro	3	6	[12]
4	(Serbia) N Ćirić (Montenegro) G Tošić	6	3	[10]
(Slovenia) A Bedene (Slovenia) G Žemlja	7	7^{7}
2	(Croatia) T Androić (Serbia) N Čačić	5	6^{3}

Final
(Spain) R Bautista-Agut (Spain) I Navarro	3	7^{12}	[10]
(Slovenia) A Bedene (Slovenia) G Žemlja	6	6^{10}	[12]
