= 2009 BMW Ljubljana Open – Doubles =

Doubles
- 2009 BMW Ljubljana Open

Final
- Champions: (United Kingdom) Jamie Delgado (United Kingdom) Jamie Murray
- Runners-up: (France) Stéphane Robert (Italy) Simone Vagnozzi
- Score: 6–3, 6–3

Events
Singles	Doubles
← 2008 ·	BMW Ljubljana Open	· 2010 →

Juan Pablo Brzezicki and Mariano Hood were the defending champions; however, they didn't start this year.
British pair Jamie Delgado and Jamie Murray won this tournament, after their won against Stéphane Robert and Simone Vagnozzi 6–3, 6–3 in the final match.

== Seeds ==
1. (United Kingdom) Jamie Delgado / (United Kingdom) Jamie Murray (champions)
2. (Russia) Michail Elgin / (Latvia) Deniss Pavlovs (semifinals)
3. (United Kingdom) Jonathan Marray / (Australia) Joseph Sirianni (quarterfinals)
4. (France) Stéphane Robert / (Italy) Simone Vagnozzi (final)

== Draw ==
=== Key ===
- Q = Qualifier
- WC = Wild card
- LL = Lucky loser
- Alt = Alternate
- SE = Special exempt
- PR = Protected ranking
- ITF = ITF entry
- JE = Junior exempt
- w/o = Walkover
- r = Retired
- d = Defaulted
- SR = Special ranking

=== Draw ===
First round
1	(United Kingdom) J Delgado (United Kingdom) J Murray	6	6
(Poland) M Gawron (Czech Republic) D Lojda	0	1
(Jamaica) D Brown (Austria) R Eitzinger	1	2
(Croatia) I Dodig (Croatia) A Veić	6	6
3	(United Kingdom) J Marray (Australia) J Sirianni	6	6
WC	(Slovenia) B Rola (Slovenia) T Turk	3	3
(Poland) T Bednarek (Poland) M Kowalczyk	6	6
ALT	(Slovenia) R Jarc (Slovenia) T Žitnik	3	2
WC	(Croatia) A Pavić (Slovenia) J Semrajc	7	6
(Italy) E Burzi (Italy) P Lorenzi	5	3
(Serbia) I Bozoljac (Montenegro) G Tošić	4	1
4	(France) S Robert (Italy) S Vagnozzi	6	6
(Canada) A Shamasdin (Italy) T Tenconi	6	2	[11]
(Monaco) B Balleret (France) J Eysseric	3	6	[9]
(Russia) I Belyaev (Russia) E Donskoy	6^{4}	6^{5}
2	(Russia) M Elgin (Latvia) D Pavlovs	7	7

Quarterfinals
1	(United Kingdom) J Delgado (United Kingdom) J Murray	6	7
(Croatia) I Dodig (Croatia) A Veić	2	6^{5}
3	(United Kingdom) J Marray (Australia) J Sirianni	3	6	[6]
(Poland) T Bednarek (Poland) M Kowalczyk	6	3	[10]
WC	(Croatia) A Pavić (Slovenia) J Semrajc	4	2
4	(France) S Robert (Italy) S Vagnozzi	6	6
(Canada) A Shamasdin (Italy) T Tenconi	3	6^{4}
2	(Russia) M Elgin (Latvia) D Pavlovs	6	7

Semifinals
1	(United Kingdom) J Delgado (United Kingdom) J Murray	3	7	[12]
(Poland) T Bednarek (Poland) M Kowalczyk	6	6^{5}	[10]
4	(France) S Robert (Italy) S Vagnozzi	6	6
2	(Russia) M Elgin (Latvia) D Pavlovs	1	2

Finals
1	(United Kingdom) J Delgado (United Kingdom) J Murray	6	6
4	(France) S Robert (Italy) S Vagnozzi	3	3
