= 2009 BMW Ljubljana Open – Singles =

Singles
- 2009 BMW Ljubljana Open

Final
- Champion: (Italy) Paolo Lorenzi
- Runner-up: (Slovenia) Grega Žemlja
- Score: 1–6, 7–6(4), 6–2

Events
Singles	Doubles
← 2008 ·	BMW Ljubljana Open	· 2010 →

Ilija Bozoljac was the defending champion, but retired due to a right ankle injury in the second round, when he played with his compatriot Filip Krajinović.
Paolo Lorenzi defeated Grega Žemlja 1–6, 7–6(4), 6–2 in the final.

== Seeds ==
1. (Italy) Paolo Lorenzi (champion)
2. (Croatia) Roko Karanušić (quarterfinals)
3. (France) Stéphane Robert (semifinals)
4. (Slovenia) Blaž Kavčič (first round)
5. (Serbia) Ilija Bozoljac (second round, retired due to a right ankle injury)
6. (Croatia) Ivan Dodig (first round)
7. (Italy) Tomas Tenconi (second round)
8. (Slovenia) Grega Žemlja (final)

== Draw ==
=== Key ===
- Q = Qualifier
- WC = Wild card
- LL = Lucky loser
- Alt = Alternate
- SE = Special exempt
- PR = Protected ranking
- ITF = ITF entry
- JE = Junior exempt
- w/o = Walkover
- r = Retired
- d = Defaulted
- SR = Special ranking

=== Final four ===
Semifinals
1	(Italy) Paolo Lorenzi	6	6
WC	(Slovenia) Janez Semrajc	1	2
3	(France) Stéphane Robert	1	5
8	(Slovenia) Grega Žemlja	6	7

Final
1	(Italy) Paolo Lorenzi	1	7	6
8	(Slovenia) Grega Žemlja	6	6^{4}	2

=== Top half ===
First round
1	(Italy) P Lorenzi	6	6
WC	(Slovenia) M Zakovšek	0	0
(Monaco) B Balleret	6	6
WC	(Slovenia) R Bonin	4	2
Q	(France) J Eysseric	4	1
(Serbia) F Krajinović	6	6
(Croatia) A Veić	0	1
5	(Serbia) I Bozoljac	6	6
4	(Slovenia) B Kavčič	4	3
(Italy) E Burzi	6	6
(Jamaica) D Brown	6	5	6
(Poland) M Gawron	3	7	4
(Russia) I Belyaev	6	4	2
Q	(Montenegro) G Tošić	0	6	6
WC	(Slovenia) J Semrajc	6	6
6	(Croatia) I Dodig	3	1

Second round
1	(Italy) P Lorenzi	6	6
(Monaco) B Balleret	3	1
(Serbia) F Krajinović	1
5	(Serbia) I Bozoljac	3	r
(Italy) E Burzi	6	6
(Jamaica) D Brown	0	4
Q	(Montenegro) G Tošić	6^{1}	7	3
WC	(Slovenia) J Semrajc	7	5	6

Quarterfinals
1	(Italy) P Lorenzi	6	4	6
(Serbia) F Krajinović	0	6	2
(Italy) E Burzi	3	4
WC	(Slovenia) J Semrajc	6	6

Semifinals
1	(Italy) P Lorenzi	6	6
WC	(Slovenia) J Semrajc	1	2

=== Bottom half ===
First round
7	(Italy) T Tenconi	6	4	6
SE	(Czech Republic) D Lojda	1	6	3
(Monaco) J-R Lisnard	0	0
(Italy) S Vagnozzi	6	6
(Russia) E Kirillov	6	2	6
(Latvia) D Pavlovs	4	6	4
(Russia) M Elgin	2	1	r
3	(France) S Robert	6	4
8	(Slovenia) G Žemlja	6	0
WC	(Slovenia) A Bedene	3	1	r
Q	(Hungary) Á Kellner	6	6
(Austria) R Eitzinger	4	1
Q	(Hungary) K Bardóczky	6	6
(Australia) J Sirianni	2	0
(Italy) A Arnaboldi	6	1	3
2	(Croatia) R Karanušić	3	6	6

Second round
7	(Italy) T Tenconi	6^{2}	6	4
(Italy) S Vagnozzi	7	3	6
(Russia) E Kirillov	3	2
3	(France) S Robert	6	6
8	(Slovenia) G Žemlja	6	6
Q	(Hungary) Á Kellner	1	3
Q	(Hungary) K Bardóczky	6	0	0
2	(Croatia) R Karanušić	1	6	6

Quarterfinals
(Italy) S Vagnozzi	0	2
3	(France) S Robert	6	6
8	(Slovenia) G Žemlja	6	6
2	(Croatia) R Karanušić	1	4

Semifinals
3	(France) S Robert	1	5
8	(Slovenia) G Žemlja	6	7
