= 2009 BMW Ljubljana Open =

- Date: 21–27 September
- Edition: 18th
- Location: Ljubljana, Slovenia

Champions

Singles
- (Italy) Paolo Lorenzi

Doubles
- (United Kingdom) Jamie Delgado / (United Kingdom) Jamie Murray
- BMW Ljubljana Open

The 2009 BMW Ljubljana Open was a professional tennis tournament played on outdoor red clay courts. It was the eighteenth edition of the tournament which was part of the 2009 ATP Challenger Tour. It took place in Ljubljana, Slovenia between 21 and 27 September 2009.

== Singles main draw entrants ==
=== Seeds ===
Country	Player	Rank^{1}	Seed
ITA	Paolo Lorenzi	123	1
CRO	Roko Karanušić	131	2
FRA	Stéphane Robert	135	3
SLO	Blaž Kavčič	149	4
SRB	Ilija Bozoljac	163	5
CRO	Ivan Dodig	168	6
ITA	Tomas Tenconi	183	7
SLO	Grega Žemlja	185	8

- Rankings are as of 14 September 2009.

=== Other entrants ===
The following players received wildcards into the singles main draw:

- (Slovenia) Rok Bonin
- (Slovenia) Aljaž Bedene
- (Slovenia) Janez Semrajc
- (Slovenia) Mark Zakovšek

The following player received a Special Exempt into the singles main draw:

- (Czech Republic) Dušan Lojda

The following players received entry from the qualifying draw:

- (France) Jonathan Eysseric
- (Hungary) Kornél Bardóczky
- (Hungary) Ádám Kellner
- (Montenegro) Goran Tošić

== Champions ==
=== Singles ===
(Italy) Paolo Lorenzi def. (Slovenia) Grega Žemlja, 1–6, 7–6(4), 6–2

=== Doubles ===
(United Kingdom) Jamie Delgado / (United Kingdom) Jamie Murray def. (France) Stéphane Robert / (Italy) Simone Vagnozzi, 6–3, 6–3
