= 2010 BMW Ljubljana Open =

- Date: September 20–26, 2010
- Edition: 19th
- Location: Ljubljana, Slovenia

Champions

Singles
- (Slovenia) Blaž Kavčič

Doubles
- (Croatia) Nikola Mektić / (Croatia) Ivan Zovko
- BMW Ljubljana Open

The 2010 BMW Ljubljana Open was a professional tennis tournament played on outdoor hard courts. It was part of the 2010 ATP Challenger Tour. It took place in Ljubljana, Slovenia between September 20 and 26, 2010. The courts that this tournament were played at were the TC ZTK Ljubljana center, which is a prominent venue for these types of events.

== Singles main-draw entrants ==
=== Seeds ===
Nationality	Player	Ranking*	Seeding
ITA	Paolo Lorenzi	108	1
SLO	Grega Žemlja	119	2
SLO	Blaž Kavčič	120	3
SRB	Ilija Bozoljac	129	4
FRA	Éric Prodon	155	5
CZE	Ivo Minář	158	6
BEL	Christophe Rochus	178	7
RUS	Andrey Kuznetsov	186	8

- Rankings are as of September 13, 2010.

=== Other entrants ===
The following players received wildcards into the singles main draw:

- (Slovenia) Luka Gregorc
- (Slovenia) Tilen Žitnik
- (Slovenia) Borut Puc
- (Austria) Thomas Muster

The following players received entry as a special entrant into the singles main draw:

- (Slovenia) Janez Semrajc

The following players received entry from the qualifying draw:

- (Serbia) Ivan Bjelica
- (Serbia) Boris Pašanski
- (Norway) Erling Tveit
- (Serbia) Miljan Zekić

== Champions ==
=== Singles ===
(Slovenia) Blaž Kavčič def. (Belgium) David Goffin, 6–2, 4–6, 7–5

=== Doubles ===
(Croatia) Nikola Mektić / (Croatia) Ivan Zovko def. (Croatia) Marin Draganja / (Croatia) Dino Marcan, 3–6, 6–0, [10–3]

== Sources ==
- Site about Slovenian Tennis
- ITF Search
- https://ztk.si/\
- https://www.bizi.si/ZELEZNICARSKI-TENISKI-KLUB-LJUBLJANA/
