= 1990 Renault Slovenian Open – Singles =

Singles
- 1990 Renault Slovenian Open

Final
- Champion: (Sweden) Magnus Larsson
- Runner-up: (Italy) Diego Nargiso
- Score: 7-5, 6-7, 7-6

Events
Singles	Doubles
- Renault Slovenian Open

This was the first edition of the tournament.

== Seeds ==
1. unknown player has withdrawn
2. (Canada) Andrew Sznajder (second round)
3. (Netherlands) Mark Koevermans (semifinals)
4. (Italy) Omar Camporese (semifinals)
5. (Socialist Federal Republic of Yugoslavia) Bruno Orešar (second round)
6. (Argentina) Christian Miniussi (second round)
7. (Spain) Fernando Luna (second round)
8. (Sweden) Magnus Larsson

== Draw ==
Key

- Q = Qualifier
- WC = Wild card
- LL = Lucky loser
- Alt = Alternate
- ITF = ITF entry
- PR = Protected ranking
- SR = Special ranking
- SE = Special exempt
- JE = Junior exempt
- JR = Junior Accelerator Programme entrant
- CO = College Accelerator Programme entrant
- NG = Next Gen Accelerator Program entrant
- w/o = Walkover
- r = Retired
- d = Defaulted

=== Finals ===
Semifinals
8	(Sweden) Magnus Larsson	1	6	7
4	(Italy) Omar Camporese	6	1	6
3	(Netherlands) Mark Koevermans	4	4
(Italy) Diego Nargiso	6	6

Final
8	(Sweden) Magnus Larsson	7	6	7
(Italy) Diego Nargiso	5	7	6

=== Top half ===
First round
LL	(Austria) G Schaller	4	7	4
(Germany) P Vojtíšek	6	6	6
(Soviet Union) A Võsand	6	6
(Portugal) N Marques	1	1
(Portugal) J Cunha-Silva	6	4	7
(Italy) S Pescosolido	4	6	6
Q	(Italy) N Bruno	3	4
8	(Sweden) M Larsson	6	6
4	(Italy) O Camporese	6	6
(Italy) G Pozzi	4	1
WC	(Italy) F Cancellotti	5	4
(Cuba) M Tabares	6	7
(Germany) C Geyer	1	4
(Belgium) B Wuyts	6	6
(Sweden) N Kulti	0	6	3
5	(Socialist Federal Republic of Yugoslavia) B Orešar	6	3	6

Second round
(Germany) P Vojtíšek	2	3
(Soviet Union) A Võsand	6	6
(Portugal) J Cunha-Silva	1	1
8	(Sweden) M Larsson	6	6
4	(Italy) O Camporese	6	4	6
(Cuba) M Tabares	4	6	2
(Belgium) B Wuyts	7	6
5	(Socialist Federal Republic of Yugoslavia) B Orešar	6	2

Quarterfinals
(Soviet Union) A Võsand	3	3
8	(Sweden) M Larsson	6	6
4	(Italy) O Camporese	6	6
(Belgium) B Wuyts	2	4

Semifinals
8	(Sweden) M Larsson	1	6	7
4	(Italy) O Camporese	6	1	6

=== Bottom half ===
First round
6	(Argentina) C Miniussi	7	6
(New Zealand) S Guy	6	3
Q	(Cuba) J Pino	3	0
(Spain) C Costa	6	6
WC	(Socialist Federal Republic of Yugoslavia) I Božič	3	6	7
(Italy) C Caratti	6	3	6
(Italy) R Furlan	3	1
3	(Netherlands) M Koervermans	6	6
7	(Spain) F Luna	6	6
Q	(Spain) J Clavet	4	2
(Italy) D Nargiso	7	4	6
Q	(Czechoslovakia) R Vogel	6	6	4
(Italy) M Cierro	6	6	6
WC	(Socialist Federal Republic of Yugoslavia) S Hiršzon	4	7	1
WC	(Socialist Federal Republic of Yugoslavia) G Breznik	3	3
2	(Canada) A Sznajder	6	6

Second round
6	(Argentina) C Miniussi	6	4
(Spain) C Costa	6	6
(Socialist Federal Republic of Yugoslavia) I Božič	3	6	2
3	(Netherlands) M Koervermans	6	2	6
7	(Spain) F Luna	4	3
(Italy) D Nargiso	6	6
(Italy) M Cierro	6	6
(Canada) A Sznajder	3	2

Quarterfinals
(Spain) C Costa	6	6	3
3	(Netherlands) M Koervermans	3	7	6
(Italy) D Nargiso	6	6
(Italy) M Cierro	4	1

Semifinals
3	(Netherlands) M Koervermans	4	4
(Italy) D Nargiso	6	6
