= 2010 BMW Ljubljana Open – Doubles =

Doubles
- 2010 BMW Ljubljana Open

Final
- Champions: (Croatia) Nikola Mektić (Croatia) Ivan Zovko
- Runners-up: (Croatia) Marin Draganja (Croatia) Dino Marcan
- Score: 3–6, 6–0, [10–3]

Events
Singles	Doubles
- BMW Ljubljana Open

Jamie Delgado and Jamie Murray were the defending champions, but decided not to participate.
Croatian fourth-seeded pair Nikola Mektić and Ivan Zovko won this tournament. They won against their unseeded compatriots Marin Draganja and Dino Marcan 3–6, 6–0, [10–3] in the final match.

== Seeds ==
1. (Spain) Pablo Santos / (Spain) Gabriel Trujillo-Soler (second round)
2. (Italy) Alessio di Mauro / (Italy) Alessandro Motti (first round)
3. (Serbia) David Savić / (Russia) Dmitri Sitak (first round)
4. (Croatia) Nikola Mektić / (Croatia) Ivan Zovko (champions)

== Draw ==
Key

- Q = Qualifier
- WC = Wild card
- LL = Lucky loser
- Alt = Alternate
- ITF = ITF entry
- PR = Protected ranking
- SR = Special ranking
- SE = Special exempt
- JE = Junior exempt
- JR = Junior Accelerator Programme entrant
- CO = College Accelerator Programme entrant
- NG = Next Gen Accelerator Program entrant
- w/o = Walkover
- r = Retired
- d = Defaulted

=== Draw ===
First round
1	(Spain) P Santos (Spain) G Trujillo-Soler	6	6
(Italy) D Giorgini (Italy) M Trevisan	3	2
WC	(Slovenia) M Jurman (Slovenia) J Žibrat	1	6	[8]
(Italy) A Arnaboldi (Italy) M Viola	6	0	[10]
4	(Croatia) N Mektić (Croatia) I Zovko	6	6
(Russia) I Belyaev (Russia) A Kuznetsov	3	2
WC	(Slovenia) T Ternar (Slovenia) T Turk	4	6^{3}
(Serbia) I Bjelica (Estonia) J Zopp	6	7
WC	(Slovenia) R Jarc (Slovenia) T Kocevar-Desman	6^{6}	6	[11]
(Italy) F Aldi (Italy) S Galvani	7	4	[13]
(Croatia) M Draganja (Croatia) D Marcan	7	6
3	(Serbia) D Savić (Russia) D Sitak	5	1
(France) T Cazes-Carrère (France) É Prodon	3	7	[6]
(France) A Gensse (Chile) H Podlipnik	6	6^{5}	[10]
(Serbia) N Ćirić (Serbia) M Zekić	6^{5}	6	[11]
2	(Italy) A di Mauro (Italy) A Motti	7	4	[5]

Quarterfinals
1	(Spain) P Santos (Spain) G Trujillo-Soler	4	5
(Italy) A Arnaboldi (Italy) M Viola	6	7
4	(Croatia) N Mektić (Croatia) I Zovko	6	6
(Serbia) I Bjelica (Estonia) J Zopp	4	3
(Italy) F Aldi (Italy) S Galvani	w/o
(Croatia) M Draganja (Croatia) D Marcan
(France) A Gensse (Chile) H Podlipnik	3	4
(Serbia) N Ćirić (Serbia) M Zekić	6	6

Semifinals
(Italy) A Arnaboldi (Italy) M Viola	4	2
4	(Croatia) N Mektić (Croatia) I Zovko	6	6
(Croatia) M Draganja (Croatia) D Marcan	6	7
(Serbia) N Ćirić (Serbia) M Zekić	4	6^{6}

Final
4	(Croatia) N Mektić (Croatia) I Zovko	3	6	[10]
(Croatia) M Draganja (Croatia) D Marcan	6	0	[3]

== Bibliography ==
- Doubles Draw
