= 1990 Renault Slovenian Open =

- Date: 7–13 May
- Edition: 1st
- Category: ATP Challenger series
- Surface: Clay
- Location: Domžale, Slovenia
- Venue: TEN-TEN Domžale

Champions

Singles
- (Sweden) Magnus Larsson

Doubles
- (Spain) Carlos Costa / (Spain) Francisco Roig
| Renault Slovenian Open | · 1991 → |

The 1990 Renault Slovenian Open was a professional tennis tournament played on clay courts. It was the 1st edition of the tournament which was part of at time known as ATP Challenger series. It took place in Domžale, Slovenia between 7 and 13 May 1990. It was played at time on the most modern Slovene tennis center and stadium called TEN-TEN in Domžale near Ljubljana. Prize money at time was $50,000.

== Singles main-draw entrants ==
=== Seeds ===
| Country | Player | Rank^{1} | Seed |
|---|---|---|---|
| ~~unknown~~ | ~~withdrew~~ | ~~unknown~~ | ~~1~~ |
| CAN | Andrew Sznajder | 60 | 2 |
| NED | Mark Koevermans | 75 | 3 |
| ITA | Omar Camporese | 82 | 4 |
| YUG | Bruno Orešar | 100 | 5 |
| ARG | Christian Miniussi | 109 | 6 |
| ESP | Fernando Luna | 124 | 7 |
| SWE | Magnus Larsson | 137 | 8 |

- ^{1} Rankings are as of April 30, 1990.

=== Other entrants ===
The following players received wildcards into the singles main draw:

- (Italy) Francesco Cancelloti
- (Socialist Federal Republic of Yugoslavia) Iztok Božič
- (Socialist Federal Republic of Yugoslavia) Saša Hiršzon
- (Socialist Federal Republic of Yugoslavia) Gregor Breznik

The following players received entry from the qualifying draw:

- (Italy) Nicola Bruno
- (Cuba) Juan Pino
- (Spain) José Clavet
- (Czechoslovakia) Richard Vogel

The following player received entry as a lucky loser:

- (Austria) Gilbert Schaller

== Doubles main-draw entrants ==
=== Seeds ===
| Country | Player | Country | Player | Seed |
|---|---|---|---|---|
| CRO | Omar Camporese | ITA | Mark Koevermans | 1 |
| CAN | Carlos di Laura | SWE | Tomas Nydahi | 2 |
| ESP | Carlos Costa | ESP | Francisco Roig | 3 |
| BEL | Libor Pimek | ITA | Gianluca Pozzi | 4 |

- ^{1} Rankings as of April 30, 1990.

=== Other entrants ===
The following pairs received entry from the qualifying draw:

- (Austria) Gilbert Schaller / (Soviet Union) Andres Võsand

== Champions ==
=== Singles ===
- (Sweden) Magnus Larsson def. (Italy) Diego Nargiso 7–5, 6–7, 7–6

=== Doubles ===
- (Spain) Carlos Costa / (Spain) Francisco Roig def. (Italy) Omar Camporese / (Netherlands) Mark Koevermans 6–7, 6–4, 6–4
