= Roberto Bautista Agut =

Spanish professional tennis player (born 1988)

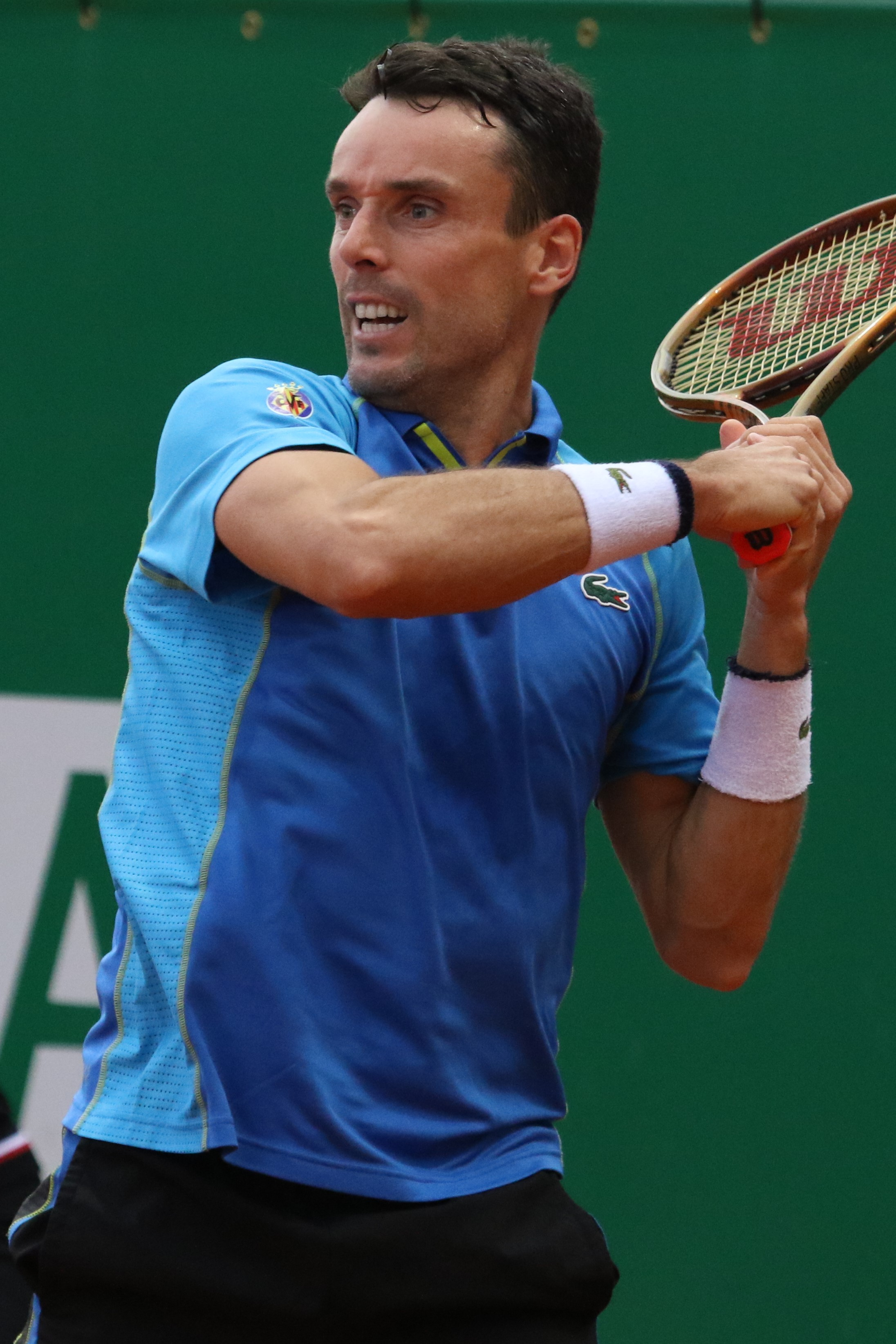
- Bautista Agut at the 2023 Monte-Carlo Masters
- Country (sports): Spain
- Residence: Castellón de la Plana, Spain
- Born: 14 April 1988 (age 38) Castellón de la Plana, Spain
- Height: 1.83 m (6 ft 0 in)
- Turned pro: 2005
- Retired: 2026
- Plays: Right-handed (two-handed backhand)
- Coach: Félix Mantilla, Daniel Gimeno Traver (2022–2026); Pepe Vendrell (2011–2021, 2023–2026)
- Prize money: US $20,524,698

Singles
- Career record: 436–302
- Career titles: 12
- Highest ranking: No. 9 (4 November 2019)

Grand Slam singles results
- Australian Open: QF (2019)
- French Open: 4R (2016, 2017)
- Wimbledon: SF (2019)
- US Open: 4R (2014, 2015)

Other tournaments
- Tour Finals: Alt (2016, 2019)
- Olympic Games: QF (2016)

Doubles
- Career record: 21–46
- Career titles: 0
- Highest ranking: No. 169 (3 March 2014)

Grand Slam doubles results
- Australian Open: 1R (2013, 2014)
- French Open: 3R (2013)
- Wimbledon: 2R (2014)
- US Open: 2R (2013)

Team competitions
- Davis Cup: W (2019)
- Hopman Cup: RR (2025)
Medal record
Mediterranean Games
Gold medal – first place	2009 Pescara	Men's singles
Bronze medal – third place	2009 Pescara	Men's doubles

Roberto Bautista Agut (Spanish pronunciation: [roˈβeɾto βawˈtista aˈɣut]; (Note: In isolation, Bautista is pronounced [bawˈtista].) born 14 April 1988) is a Spanish former professional tennis player. He was ranked by the Association of Tennis Professionals (ATP) as world No. 9 in singles, achieved in November 2019. Bautista Agut won twelve ATP Tour singles titles, and reached the semifinals at the 2019 Wimbledon Championships. He was part of the victorious Spanish team at the 2019 Davis Cup.

== Career ==
=== 2009–2012: Grand Slam and top 100 debuts ===
In 2009, Bautista Agut qualified for the ATP 500 tournament in Valencia, where he lost to Albert Montañés in the first round.

He qualified for his first Grand Slam appearance in the 2012 Australian Open. He lost in the first round to Ricardo Mello in straight sets.

On 13 August 2012, Bautista Agut broke into the top 100 for the first time after strong performances in Challenger tournaments. He reached his first ATP-level quarterfinal at St. Petersburg later that year, losing to Fabio Fognini.

=== 2013: First final ===
His first tournament of 2013, in Chennai, saw him reach his first career ATP final. Bautista Agut defeated world No. 6, Tomáš Berdych, in the quarterfinals in three sets and faced world No. 9, Janko Tipsarević, in the final, to whom he lost despite winning the first set.

Bautista Agut then followed with his then career-best Grand Slam performance at the Australian Open. After defeating Fabio Fognini in a first round five-setter, he fell to Jürgen Melzer in the second round.

At Roland Garros, he reached the third round, after failing to even qualify at the main event for three consecutive occasions. His run ended to local Jérémy Chardy.

At the Topshelf Open, Bautista Agut went through to the quarterfinals, before losing to Xavier Malisse.

At the Wimbledon, he went on to make another second-round appearance after defeating Russian qualifier Teymuraz Gabashvili in the first round. However, he fell to his childhood idol, David Ferrer, in the second round, losing in four sets.

Bautista Agut then took part at the Mercedes Cup in Stuttgart. He made it to the semifinal where he lost to eventual champion Fabio Fognini. On 15 July, Bautista Agut broke the top 50 for the first time.

At the US Open, he achieved another second round finish. After beating Thomaz Bellucci in the first round, he faced Ferrer in the second, where Bautista Agut lost in four sets.

He finished the year with a quarterfinal appearance at the St. Petersburg Open, defeated by eventual champion Ernests Gulbis.

Bautista Agut finished the 2013 season ranked No. 58.

=== 2014: First ATP titles, top 15 ===
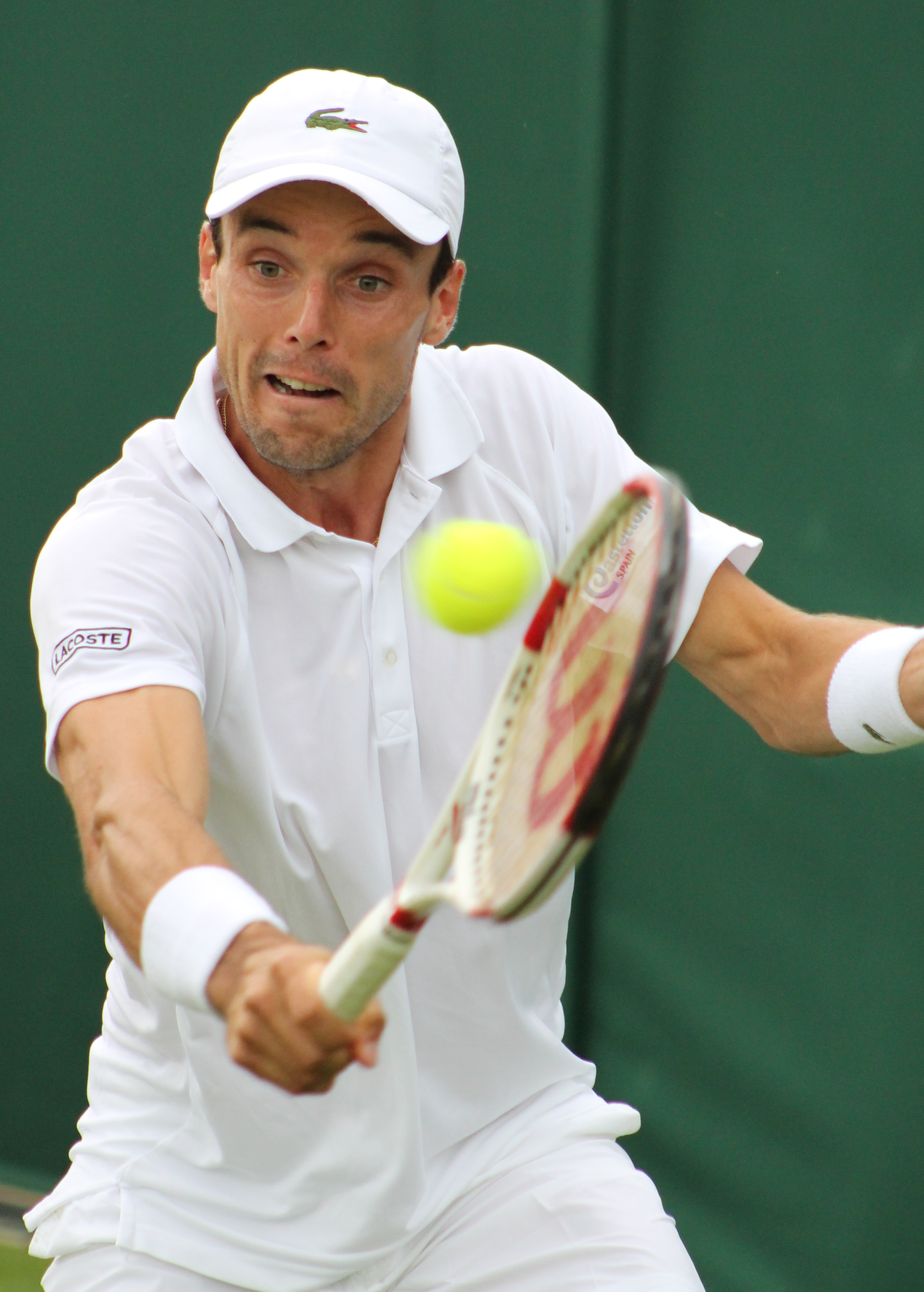
Bautista Agut at the 2014 Wimbledon Championships

His 2014 campaign began in Auckland, where he made the semifinals of the Heineken Open. He lost to third seed and eventual champion John Isner after winning the first set.

Bautista Agut started at the Australian Open with a first-round victory over Tim Smyczek. In the second, he faced and upset world No. 5 Juan Martín del Potro in five sets, his first victory against a top-ten player.

These surprising performances earned him a call-up to Spain for their clash with Germany in the Davis Cup. Bautista Agut lost both of his rubbers to Philipp Kohlschreiber and Daniel Brands. Germany won the tie 4–1.

In March, Bautista Agut participated in the first Masters 1000 event of the year at Indian Wells. In the second round, he faced Tomáš Berdych and achieved his second top-ten win of the year, winning in three sets after losing the first. His tournament ended in the fourth round with a defeat to Ernests Gulbis.

In May, Roberto participated in the Madrid Masters. He made it to the tournament's semifinals after beating former top-ten players, Tommy Robredo, Fernando Verdasco, and an in-form Barcelona finalist Santiago Giraldo en route to this stage. In the semifinal, Bautista Agut was defeated by world No. 1, Rafael Nadal.

Roberto then played in the French Open. This was his first Grand Slam tournament where he was one of the top 32 seeded players, seeded 27th. Bautista Agut beat Paolo Lorenzi, and Frenchman Benoît Paire but he was unable to beat world No. 6 Tomáš Berdych, ending his tournament in the third round after a four-set defeat.

In preparation for Wimbledon, he played in the Topshelf Open, a grass-court tournament in 's-Hertogenbosch, as the third seed. Bautista Agut won his first ATP title there, defeating former champion Benjamin Becker in the final in three sets.

He then played in the Wimbledon Championships. After defeating Steve Johnson and Jan Hernych, his run ended at the hands of the defending champion Andy Murray in the third round.

He went back to playing on clay courts as the third seed in the Mercedes Cup in Stuttgart. In the semifinal, Bautista Agut recorded an upset, beating defending champion Fabio Fognini for the second time in his career. This result led him to take on Lukáš Rosol in the final, his third professional ATP tournament final. Bautista Agut won in three sets, claiming his second 250-level title.

In the US Open, Bautista Agut reached the fourth round, after defeating Andreas Haider-Maurer, Tim Smyczek, and Adrian Mannarino on the way to taking on the No. 2 seed Roger Federer. He lost in straight sets. This was his best ever US Open campaign and he equaled his best career Grand Slam result (2014 Australian Open).

Bautista Agut went to Russia to play in the Kremlin Cup tournament held in Moscow. He advanced to the final where he took on the 2014 US Open champion, Marin Čilić, in the final. His tournament ended with a tight straight-set defeat.

After his outstanding season, Bautista Agut won the ATP's Most Improved Player award.

At the end of the best season in his career so far, he finished 2014 with a singles ranking of world No. 15, and a doubles ranking of No. 255.

=== 2015: Wimbledon fourth round ===
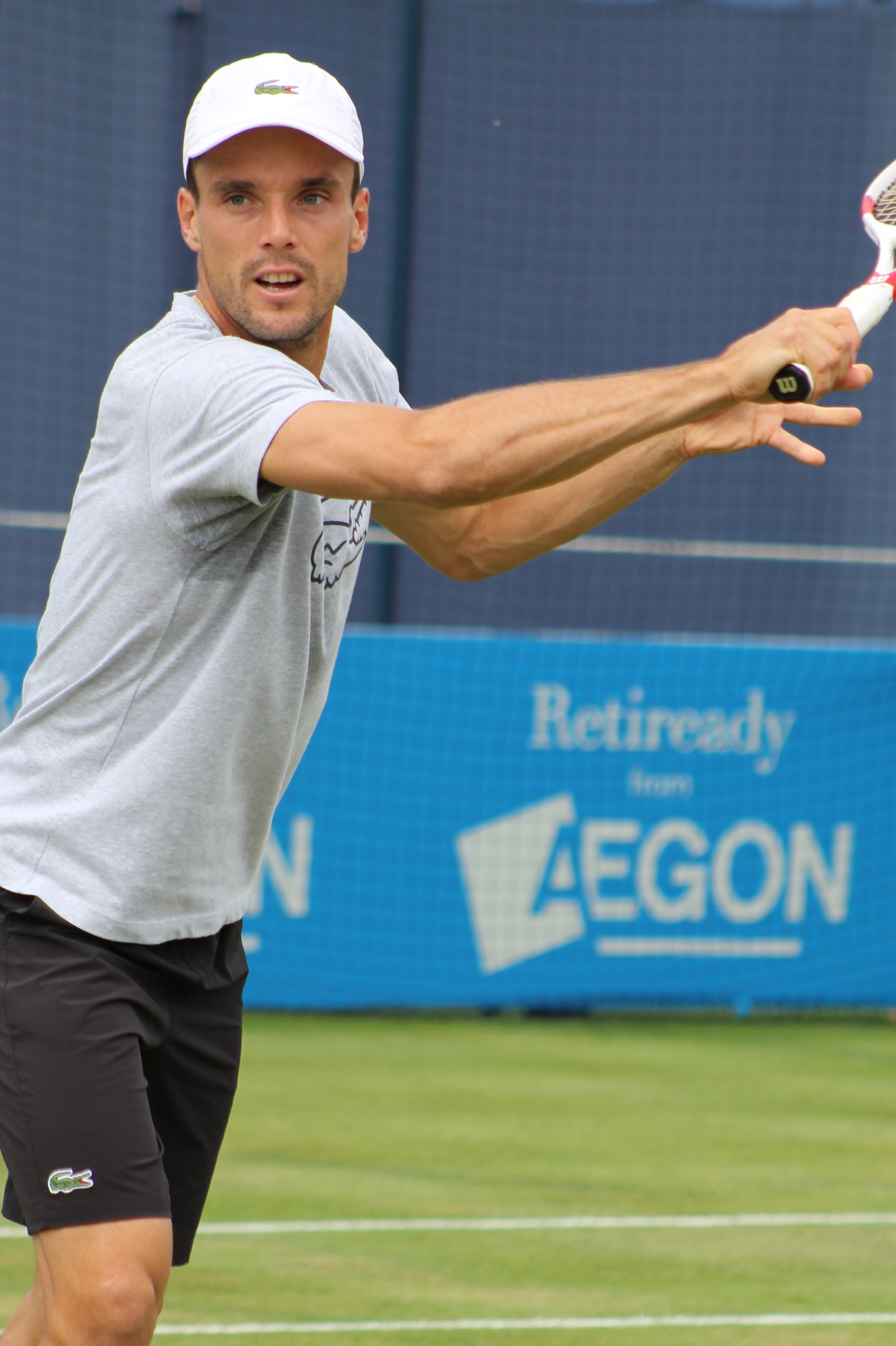
Bautista Agut at the 2015 Queen's Club Championships

Bautista Agut began his new season, as the third seed, in the Aircel Chennai Open. He progressed to the semifinal where he lost to British qualifier Aljaž Bedene.

In February, Bautista Agut traveled to France to play in the Open 13 tournament in Marseille. His tournament ended in the semifinals against local Gaël Monfils.

In April, Bautista Agut travelled to Spain to play on the clay courts at the Barcelona Open. He made it to the quarterfinals where he was defeated in a tight three-setter by defending champion Kei Nishikori.

Later that month, he travelled to Germany to play in the BMW Open in Munich. Bautista Agut progressed to the semifinals where he lost to top seed Andy Murray.

One month later, he travelled to England to play in the year's third major. Bautista Agut was the 20th seed in Wimbledon, and advanced to the fourth round to take on seven-time Wimbledon champion and tournament second seed, Roger Federer, after wins over Ruben Bemelmans, Benoît Paire, and Nikoloz Basilashvili but lost in straight sets.

In July, he played as the second seed in the Croatia Open and advanced to the semifinals where he was defeated by João Sousa.

In September, Bautista Agut was the 23rd seed in the US Open. After victories over Pierre-Hugues Herbert, Pablo Carreño Busta, and David Goffin, he reached the fourth round of a major for a second consecutive time. He took on the world number one, Novak Djokovic, losing in a four-set defeat. However, Bautista Agut had managed to repeat his best performance in New York for a second consecutive year.

He then played in the St. Petersburg Open where he was the fourth seed. He lost in the semifinals to second seed Miloš Raonić.

He was the second seed in the Kremlin Cup, and in a repeat of the previous years final, Bautista Agut lost against Marin Čilić by the same scoreline (4–6, 4–6).

He was the seventh seed in the Valencia Open. With most of the seeds falling early, it was a shock draw with Bautista Agut being the only seeded player remaining by the semifinals. Bautista Agut reached the final where he led by a set and a break against João Sousa but failed to consolidate, going on to lose the match, which was the trend of his 2015 season in decisive matches.

At the end of 2015, he finished outside the top 20 with a ranking of 25.

=== 2016: Inaugural Sofia champion, first Masters final ===
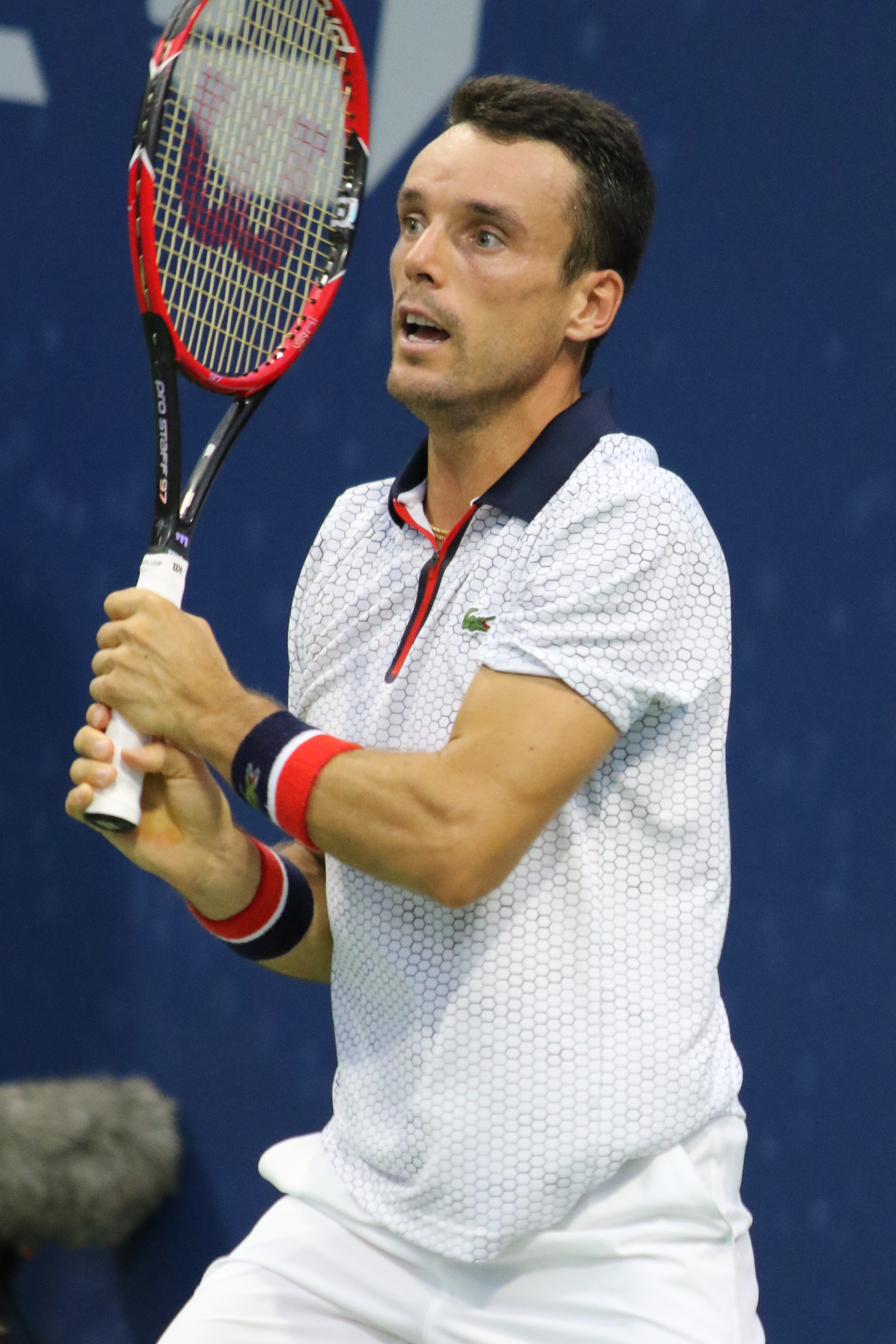
Bautista Agut at the 2016 US Open

In the ASB Classic, Bautista Agut knocked out defending Champion Jiří Veselý, third seeded American John Isner and second seeded Frenchman Jo-Wilfried Tsonga, his first top-ten scalp in two years, on his way to the final where he took on talented American Jack Sock. He was crowned champion after the American retired in the second set.

In the Australian Open Bautista Agut was seeded 24th. After defeating Martin Kližan and Dušan Lajović, he took on 12th seed Marin Čilić in the third round. He earned his first ever win over Čilić in a shock straight-sets result setting up a match-up with the sixth seed, Tomáš Berdych. Bautista Agut lost in a tough five setter, denying him a chance at his first Grand Slam quarterfinal.

His first tournament after the Australian Open was the Garanti Koza Sofia Open based in Bulgaria. Bautista Agut was the top seed and made it all the way to the final where he took on Serbian second seed Viktor Troicki. He won the match and became the inaugural Garanti Koza Sofia Open champion. This was his fourth career title and second title in 2016.

In May, Bautista Agut played in the year's second major as the 14th seed. He reached the fourth round of the French Open after he defeated Dmitry Tursunov, Paul-Henri Mathieu, and Borna Ćorić. His quest for a place in a Grand Slam quarterfinal was again ended by a top-ten player, this time by world number one, Novak Djokovic. This result was his best result at the French Open and equals his best at Grand Slam level.

In early August, Bautista Agut was a representative for Spain at the Olympic Games. He advanced to the quarterfinals in Rio de Janeiro after beating Andrey Kuznetsov, Paolo Lorenzi, and Gilles Müller in the earlier rounds. His quest for an Olympic medal ended after a defeat against the eventual silver-medalist Juan Martín del Potro.

Later that month, Bautista Agut reached the final of the Winston-Salem Open in which he lost to compatriot Pablo Carreño Busta in three sets.

In the penultimate Masters 1000 event of the year, the Shanghai Masters, Bautista Agut made it to his first Masters-1000 final, defeating Bernard Tomic (who was forced to retire because of abdominal pain), qualifier Taylor Fritz, Viktor Troicki, 2015 finalist Jo-Wilfried Tsonga, and top seed and defending champion Novak Djoković. This was the first time in his career he had beaten Djokovic and the first time he had defeated a world No. 1 player. In the final, he lost to Andy Murray in straight sets.

Bautista Agut finished 2016 ranked No. 14 in the world.

=== 2017: Two ATP titles ===
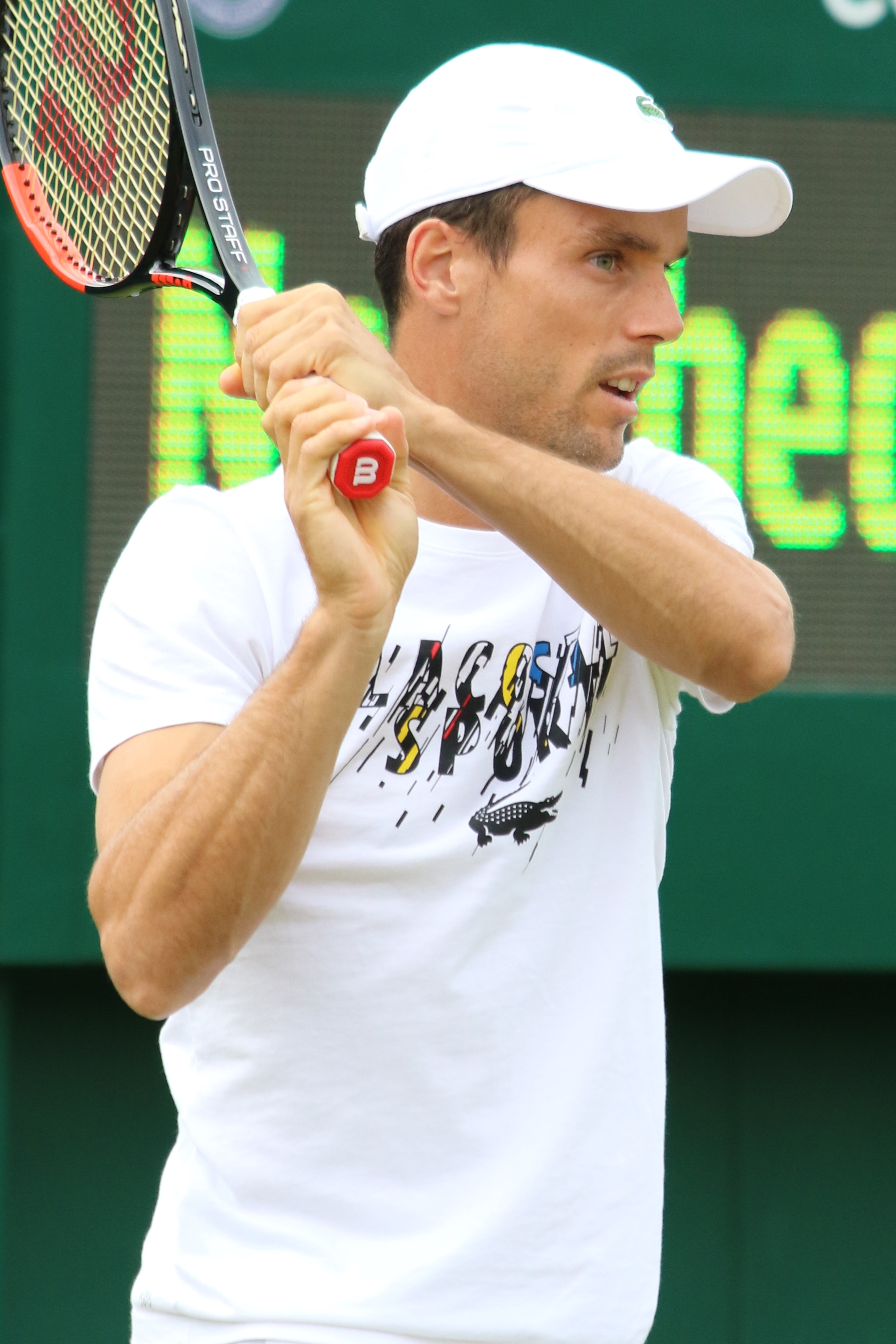
Bautista Agut at the 2017 Wimbledon Championships

He began his 2017 season in Chennai where he made it all the way to the final. In the final, Bautista Agut beat Daniil Medvedev in straight sets, securing his fifth career title.

At the Wimbledon Championships, Bautista Agut was the 18th seed. He went on to beat Andreas Haider-Maurer, and Peter Gojowczyk, on his way to a third round meeting with ninth seed Kei Nishikori. Bautista Agut caused an upset beating Nishikori for the first time and claiming his seventh top-ten scalp of his career. However, he was not able to win back to back top-ten victories, after succumbing to a straight-sets defeat against Marin Čilić in the fourth round.

In the Rogers Cup, Bautista Agut demonstrated his best Masters 1000 performance for the year. After winning his first two matches, he took on Gaël Monfils in the third round. After losing the first set, Bautista Agut was able to secure an unlikely victory, securing his first win over the Frenchman in three tight sets. However, he then was unable to break his winless drought against Roger Federer, in the quarterfinals, losing in straight-sets.

A couple of weeks later, Bautista Agut took part in the Winston-Salem Open. He won all of his matches, without dropping a set, to win his second 250 title of the year, and sixth of his career.

Bautista Agut finished the year ranked No. 20 in the world.

=== 2018: Dubai Champion ===
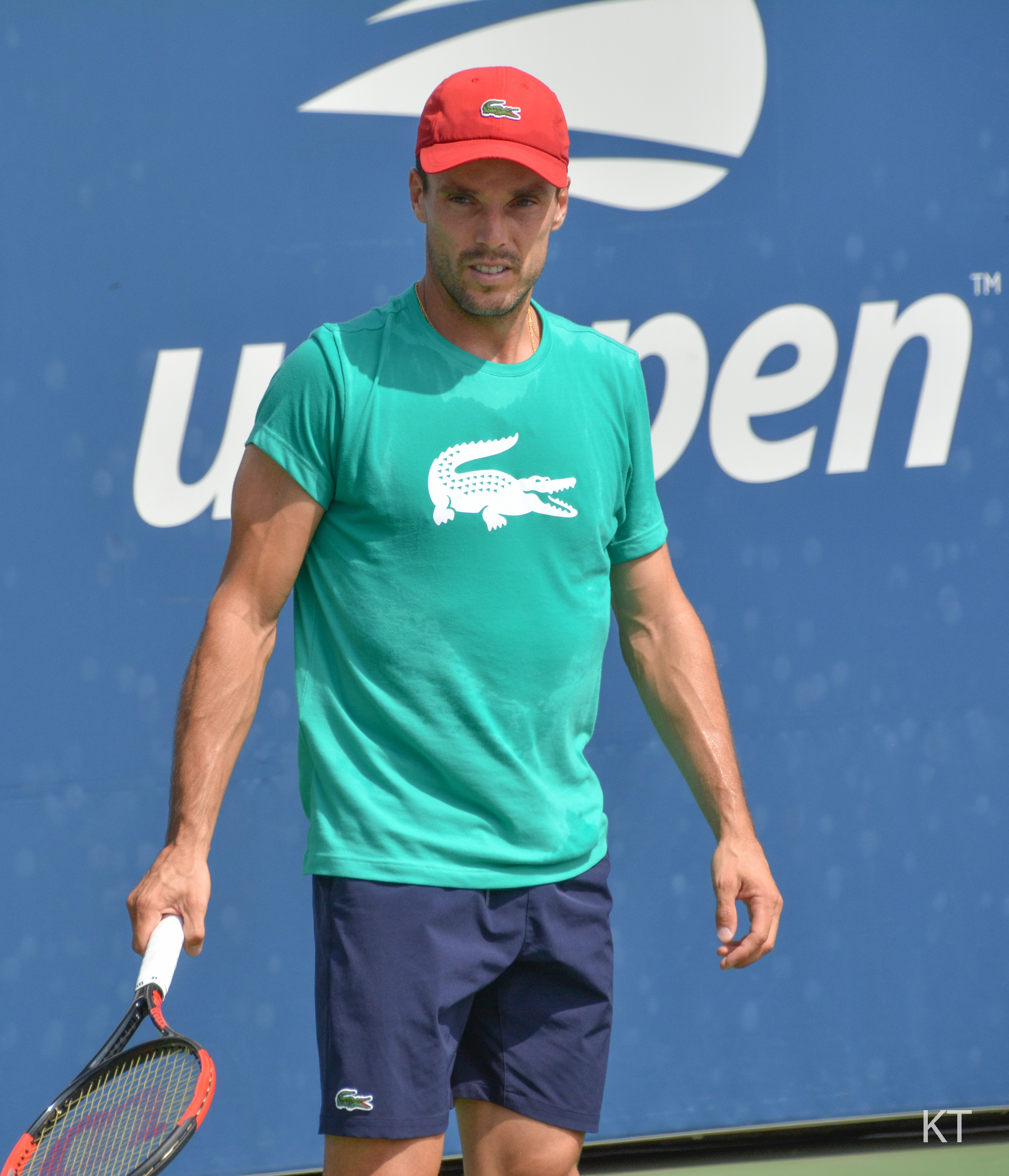
Bautista Agut practicing at the 2018 US Open

In Auckland, he made it to his 13th ATP final appearance. In the final, Bautista Agut took on second seed Juan Martín del Potro, who had yet to drop a set in the tournament. He went on to beat his opponent in three sets, clinching his second Auckland title, and ending a three-match losing streak against the tall Argentine.

Bautista Agut lost in the first round of the Australian Open, meaning that his streak of ten consecutive third round appearances in majors came to an end. It was also his first loss in the opening round of a major since the end of the 2012 season, marking 20 consecutive majors where he won his opening match.

In March, he won his biggest title yet in the ATP 500 tournament in Dubai, losing only one set along the way and beating in-form Lucas Pouille in the final. Bautista Agut also became the first player outside the top ten, to win the event since Fabrice Santoro in 2002.

He finished the year ranked No. 24 in the world.

=== 2019: Wimbledon semifinal, top 10, Davis Cup title ===
Bautista Agut opened his season as the seventh seed at the Qatar Open. He defeated Matteo Berrettini, qualifier Guillermo García López, and three-time major champion Stan Wawrinka before facing world number one Novak Djokovic in the semifinals, whom he defeated in three close sets. In the final, he prevailed over veteran Tomáš Berdych to claim the title.

At the Australian Open, he first faced former world number one and five-time Australia Open finalist Andy Murray, defeating him in a grueling five-set contest. In the second round, Bautista Agut defeated John Millman in another five-setter. In the third, he prevailed over tenth seed Karen Khachanov in straight sets to reach the fourth round of a Grand Slam event for the tenth time in his career. He reached his first Grand Slam quarterfinal, after he defeated the sixth-seed Marin Čilić, in five sets. In the quarterfinals, he was defeated by 14th seed Stefanos Tsitsipas, who was fresh off a victory over defending champion Roger Federer, in four sets. With this performance, he earned enough points to re-enter the top 20 in the ATP rankings.

Bautista Agut beat top seed Djokovic yet again at the Miami Masters. At Wimbledon, he reached his second major quarterfinal after victories over Peter Gojowczyk, Steve Darcis, world No. 9 Karen Khachanov, and Benoît Paire. He was the only player in the draw not to lose a set leading into the quarterfinals. Despite losing his first set in the quarterfinals, Bautista Agut defeated Guido Pella in four sets to reach his first Grand Slam semifinal. However, he was defeated by Djokovic in four sets.

Following back to back quarterfinal appearances at the Montreal and Cincinnati Masters events, he broke into the world's top ten for the first time in his career.

=== 2020: Inaugural ATP Cup finalist, Masters semifinal, 300th win ===
Bautista Agut started the year with the 2020 Australian Open as the 9th seed, where he beat Feliciano López and Michael Mmoh before losing to Marin Čilić in five sets in the third round, a rematch of the 2019 fourth round match. He lost in the second round at Rotterdam to Pablo Carreño Busta and in the first round in Dubai to Jan-Lennard Struff.

Seeded 8th at the Cincinnati Masters, he reached the semifinals, beating 11th seed Karen Khachanov and 3rd seed Daniil Medvedev before losing to top seed Novak Djokovic in three sets.

At the 2020 US Open, Bautista Agut was also seeded 8th. He beat Tennys Sandgren for his 300th career win and Miomir Kecmanović before being upset in the third round by Canadian Vasek Pospisil.

=== 2021: Two finals, Wimbledon fourth round ===
Bautista Agut made two finals in the early hardcourt season in Montpellier and Doha, where he was defeated by David Goffin and Nikoloz Basilashvili respectively. To reach the final in Doha, Bautista Agut beat two top ten players, Dominic Thiem and Andrey Rublev. This marked the first time where he defeated two top-ten players in a single tournament.

Seeded 8th, he reached the fourth round at the 2021 Wimbledon Championships defeating John Millman, Miomir Kecmanović and Dominik Koepfer before losing to eventual semifinalist Denis Shapovalov.

=== 2022: Second ATP Cup Final, tenth title, 350th career win ===
Bautista Agut has played a pivotal role in Spain's 2022 ATP Cup journey, by winning all of his three singles matches in the group stage. He then beat Hubert Hurkacz of Poland in the semi-finals in 3 sets to lead Spain into the final. In the final, Bautista Agut suffered the decisive loss to Félix Auger-Aliassime as Team Canada won the title.

Bautista Agut reached the final of the 2022 Qatar ExxonMobil Open in Doha again to set a rematch with Nikoloz Basilashvili. He won the Doha title for the second time and his tenth in his career. Also in February he recorded his 350th win at the 2022 Dubai Tennis Championships.

On grass, in June, he reached the final in Mallorca but lost to Stefanos Tsitsipas in the championship match. At the 2022 Generali Open Kitzbühel he won his eleventh title defeating wildcard debutant Filip Misolic.

In October at the 2022 Astana Open he defeated eight seed Félix Auger-Aliassime and lucky loser Pavel Kotov to reach the quarterfinals.

=== 2023: Adelaide finalist ===
Bautista Agut started his 2023 season in Adelaide. At the first tournament, he upset fourth seed and world No. 8, Andrey Rublev, in the first round. He lost in the second round to eventual finalist Sebastian Korda. Seeded fourth at the second tournament, he beat seventh seed and compatriot, Alejandro Davidovich Fokina, in the quarterfinals and defending champion and home favorite, Thanasi Kokkinakis, in the semifinals, to reach his first final of the season. He was defeated in the final by lucky loser, Kwon Soon-woo, in three sets. Seeded 24th at the Australian Open, he reached the fourth round where he lost to eventual semifinalist, Tommy Paul.

Seeded fourth at the Open Sud de France, Bautista Agut lost in the second round to French wildcard Arthur Fils. At the Rotterdam Open, he was beaten in the first round by fifth seed and world No. 10, Hubert Hurkacz, in three sets. Fifth seed and defending champion at the Qatar ExxonMobil Open, he was eliminated from the tournament in the second round by Christopher O'Connell. In March, he competed at the BNP Paribas Open. Seeded 22nd, he fell in his second-round match to Emil Ruusuvuori. Seeded 22nd at the Miami Open, he lost in the second round to Ruusuvuori.

Bautista Agut started his clay-court season at the Estoril Open. Seeded fourth, he lost in the second round to Quentin Halys. At the Monte-Carlo Masters, he was defeated in the second round by 13th seed and world No. 16, Alexander Zverev. Seeded 13th at the Barcelona Open, he lost in the third round to top seed, world No. 2, defending champion, eventual champion, and compatriot, Carlos Alcaraz. Seeded 20th at the Madrid Open, he lost in the third round to 10th seed and world No. 12, Karen Khachanov. Seeded 21st at the Italian Open, he was defeated in the second round by Italian Marco Cecchinato. Seeded 19th at the French Open, he lost in the second round to Juan Pablo Varillas. The week after the French Open ended, Bautista Agut started his grass-court season at the Halle Open. Seeded eighth, he upset top seed and world No. 3, Daniil Medvedev, in the quarterfinals. He lost his semifinal match to third seed and world No. 7, Andrey Rublev.

After an absence of a few months on the Tour due to injury he returned to the indoor European tournaments at the 2023 Stockholm Open, the 2023 Swiss Indoors, and at the 2023 Rolex Paris Masters where he won his first match after being back against Jiri Lehecka. In Sofia he won his opening match against Miomir Kecmanovic in more than 3 hours with three tiebreaks.

=== 2024–2026: 400th win, retirement ===
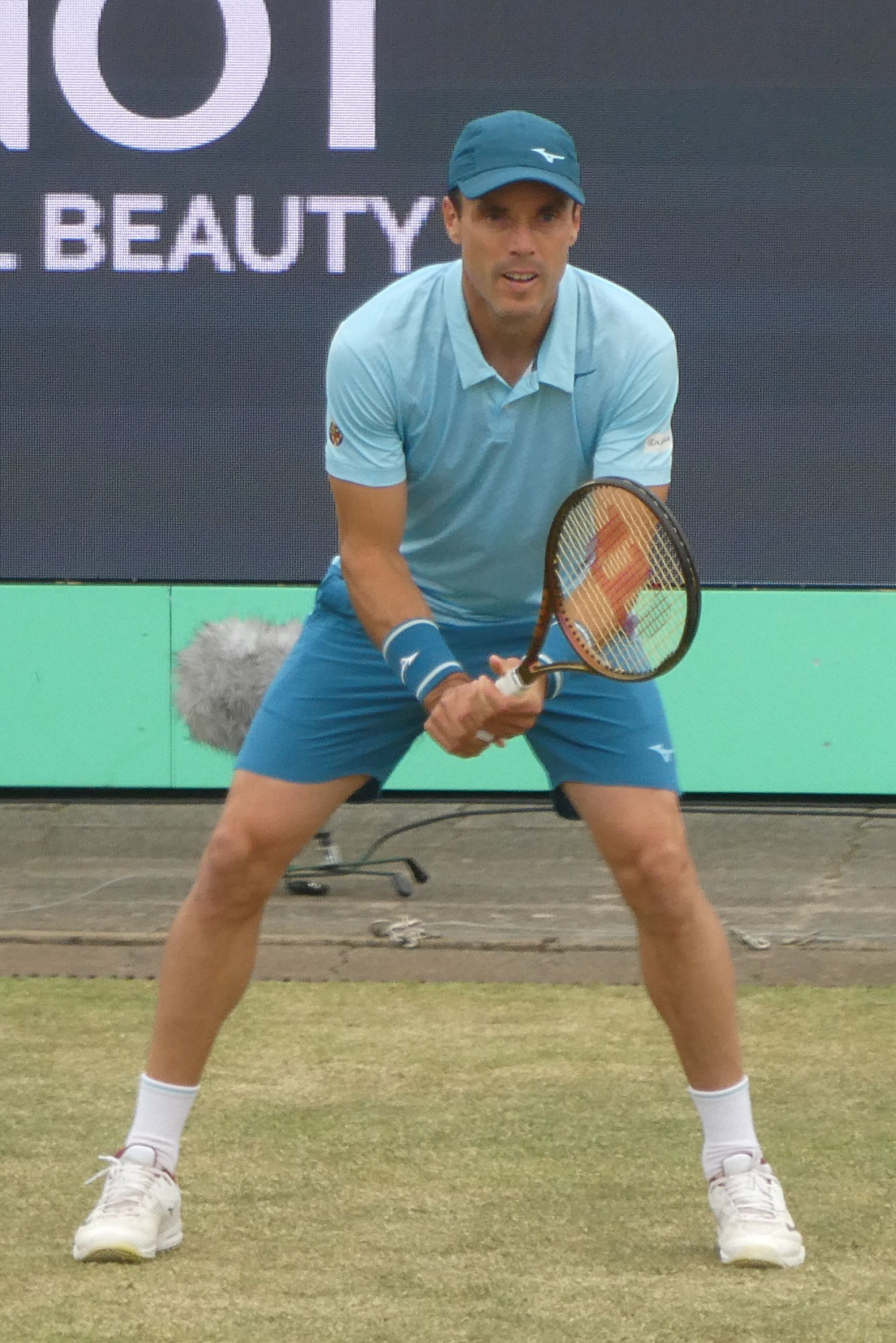
Bautista Agut at the 2024 Libéma Open

At the ATP 250 2024 Qatar ExxonMobil Open, he replaced top seed and defending champion Daniil Medvedev who pulled at the last minute, as an emergency substitution (ES), as he was a former two-times champion at this tournament. He qualified for the main draw at the 2024 Miami Open. He recorded his 400th career win at the 2024 Barcelona Open Banc Sabadell over lucky loser Andrea Vavassori in the second round. He became the 13th active player and also the 13th Spaniard in the Open Era to reach the milestone. Bautista Agut won his 12th ATP Tour singles title at the European Open in Antwerp, Belgium, in October, defeating Jiří Lehečka in the final. As a result he returned to the top 50 in the rankings at world No. 45 on 21 October 2024. His good form continued in Basel where he upset second seed Casper Ruud in three sets.

On 16 April 2026, Bautista Agut announced that he would retire from professional tennis after the 2026 season. His final tournament appearance was Copa del Rey de Tenis in July 2026.

== Playing style ==
Bautista Agut is a counterpuncher with a decent all-around game. He is able to play offensively with his forehand but thrives off his defensive ability with his consistency and quickness around the court. He has a clean flat strike on both sides and his game is better suited for hard courts (as compared to many of his Spanish compatriots). On the forehand, which is by far his primary weapon, he uses close to an Eastern which allows him a flat hit (instead of the whipping spin hit by Nadal). His backhand is easily the weaker wing and the side opponents look to target. His serve lacks pace but can create decent angles and slice.

He is known for his "no-frills" style of play grounded in consistency and precision, rather than pure power and shotmaking. However, the lack of variety in his game could also be considered a weakness.

== Personal life ==
Roberto's nickname is "Bati". His father, Joaquín, a former football player and a banker, died in November 2019 during the Davis Cup tournament; his mother, Ester, who died unexpectedly in May 2018, owned a clothing store in Castellón de la Plana. Bautista Agut started playing tennis at the age of five when his mother signed him up to play on the weekends. His favourite shot is his forehand. His idols growing up were Juan Carlos Ferrero and David Ferrer.

Beyond tennis, he enjoys horse riding (he owns seven horses) and playing various sports. He played football for Villarreal C.F. until he was 14 when he decided to focus on his tennis career.

Bautista Agut is married to Ana Bodí Tortosa. The couple were married on 30 November 2019. Their first child, a boy, was born in September 2020. Their second child, also a boy, was born in January 2025.

== Equipment ==
Bautista Agut signed with Mizuno footwear and apparel. Previously he used Lacoste apparel. He uses Wilson ProStaff tennis racquet.

== Career statistics ==
=== Performance timelines ===
Key
W	F	SF	QF	#R	RR	Q#	P#	DNQ	A	Z#	PO	G	S	B	NMS	NTI	P	NH

(W) winner; (F) finalist; (SF) semifinalist; (QF) quarterfinalist; (#R) rounds 4, 3, 2, 1; (RR) round-robin stage; (Q#) qualification round; (P#) preliminary round; (DNQ) did not qualify; (A) absent; (Z#) Davis/Fed Cup Zonal Group (with number indication) or (PO) play-off; (G) gold, (S) silver or (B) bronze Olympic/Paralympic medal; (NMS) not a Masters tournament; (NTI) not a Tier I tournament; (P) postponed; (NH) not held; (SR) strike rate (events won / competed); (W–L) win–loss record.
To avoid confusion and double counting, these charts are updated at the conclusion of a tournament or when the player's participation has ended.

==== Singles ====
Current through the 2026 Wimbledon Championships.

Tournament	2009	2010	2011	2012	2013	2014	2015	2016	2017	2018	2019	2020	2021	2022	2023	2024	2025	2026	SR	W–L	Win %
Grand Slam tournaments
Australian Open	A	Q3	Q1	1R	2R	4R	2R	4R	4R	1R	QF	3R	1R	3R	4R	1R	1R	1R	0 / 15	22–15	61%
French Open	A	Q2	Q2	Q1	2R	3R	2R	4R	4R	3R	3R	3R	2R	A	2R	1R	1R	1R	0 / 13	18–13	58%
Wimbledon	A	Q2	Q3	Q3	2R	3R	4R	3R	4R	A	SF	NH	4R	2R	1R	4R	1R	1R	0 / 12	22–12	67%
US Open	A	A	Q1	Q3	2R	4R	4R	3R	3R	1R	1R	3R	3R	1R	A	2R	1R	A	0 / 12	16–12	57%
Win–loss	0–0	0–0	0–0	0–1	4–4	10–4	8–4	9–4	11–4	2–3	11–4	6–3	6–4	3–2	4–3	4–4	0–4	0–3	0 / 52	78–52	60%
Year-end championships
ATP Finals	Did not qualify							Alt	DNQ		Alt	Did not qualify							0 / 0	0–0	0%
ATP 1000 tournaments
Indian Wells Open	A	A	A	Q1	1R	4R	3R	3R	3R	3R	2R	NH	3R	3R	2R	A	1R	2R	0 / 12	10–12	45%
Miami Open	A	A	A	2R	1R	3R	2R	4R	4R	2R	QF	NH	SF	3R	2R	2R	1R	2R	0 / 14	16–14	53%
Monte-Carlo Masters	A	A	A	A	2R	2R	3R	3R	2R	3R	2R	NH	3R	A	2R	2R	2R	1R	0 / 12	15–12	56%
Madrid Open	A	A	Q1	Q2	A	SF	3R	3R	1R	2R	1R	NH	2R	2R	3R	2R	2R	1R	0 / 12	14–12	54%
Italian Open	A	A	A	A	A	1R	2R	2R	3R	A	2R	A	3R	A	2R	A	2R	2R	0 / 9	9–9	50%
Canadian Open	A	A	A	A	A	1R	2R	A	QF	A	QF	NH	QF	3R	A	1R	A	A	0 / 7	11–7	61%
Cincinnati Open	A	A	A	A	A	2R	2R	1R	1R	A	QF	SF	1R	3R	A	Q1	3R	A	0 / 9	12–9	57%
Shanghai Masters	A	A	A	A	Q1	3R	2R	F	1R	3R	3R	NH			A	1R	A	A	0 / 7	11–7	61%
Paris Masters	A	Q1	A	1R	Q2	3R	2R	2R	3R	2R	2R	A	1R	1R	2R	A	A	A	0 / 9	4–9	31%
Win–loss	0–0	0–0	0–0	1–2	1–3	14–9	10–9	12–8	10–8	7–6	12–9	3–1	11–7	7–6	3–6	3–5	5–6	3–5	0 / 91	102–91	53%
Career statistics
	2009	2010	2011	2012	2013	2014	2015	2016	2017	2018	2019	2020	2021	2022	2023	2024	2025	2026	Career		
Tournaments	1	1	0	10	22	23	29	25	24	20	23	8	23	21	21	22	22	13	308		
Titles	0	0	0	0	0	2	0	2	2	2	1	0	0	2	0	1	0	0	12		
Finals	0	0	0	0	1	3	2	4	2	3	1	0	2	3	1	1	0	0	23		
Overall win–loss	0–1	0–1	0–0	3–10	26–22	45–23	42–29	48–23	48–21	33–20	42–22	20–8	29–25	39–20	17–21	25–21	15–22	4–13	12 / 308	436–302	59%
Win %	0%	0%	–	23%	54%	66%	59%	68%	70%	62%	66%	71%	54%	66%	45%	54%	41%	24%	59%		
Year-end ranking	281	170	178	80	58	15	25	14	20	24	9	13	19	21	57	51	92		$20,524,620		

=== Significant finals ===
==== Singles: 1 (runner up) ====
Result	Year	Tournament	Surface	Opponent	Score
Loss	2016	Shanghai Masters	Hard	(United Kingdom) Andy Murray	6–7^{(1–7)}, 1–6

=== ATP Tour finals ===
==== Singles: 23 (12 titles, 11 runner-ups) ====
Legend Grand Slam (0–0) ATP Finals (0–0) ATP 1000 (0–1) ATP 500 (1–0) ATP 250 (11–10)	Finals by surface Hard (9–9) Clay (2–1) Grass (1–1)	Finals by setting Outdoor (10–7) Indoor (2–4)

Result	W–L	Date	Tournament	Tier	Surface	Opponent	Score
Loss	0–1	Jan 2013	Chennai Open, India	ATP 250	Hard	(Serbia) Janko Tipsarević	6–3, 1–6, 3–6
Win	1–1	Jun 2014	Rosmalen Championships, Netherlands	ATP 250	Grass	(Germany) Benjamin Becker	2–6, 7–6^{(7–2)}, 6–4
Win	2–1	Jul 2014	Stuttgart Open, Germany	ATP 250	Clay	(Czech Republic) Lukáš Rosol	6–3, 4–6, 6–2
Loss	2–2	Oct 2014	Kremlin Cup, Russia	ATP 250	Hard (i)	(Croatia) Marin Čilić	4–6, 4–6
Loss	2–3	Oct 2015	Kremlin Cup, Russia	ATP 250	Hard (i)	(Croatia) Marin Čilić	4–6, 4–6
Loss	2–4	Nov 2015	Valencia Open, Spain	ATP 250	Hard (i)	(Portugal) João Sousa	6–3, 3–6, 4–6
Win	3–4	Jan 2016	Auckland Open, New Zealand	ATP 250	Hard	(United States) Jack Sock	6–1, 1–0 ret.
Win	4–4	Feb 2016	Sofia Open, Bulgaria	ATP 250	Hard (i)	(Serbia) Viktor Troicki	6–3, 6–4
Loss	4–5	Aug 2016	Winston-Salem Open, US	ATP 250	Hard	(Spain) Pablo Carreño Busta	7–6^{(8–6)}, 6–7^{(1–7)}, 4–6
Loss	4–6	Oct 2016	Shanghai Masters, China	ATP 1000	Hard	(United Kingdom) Andy Murray	6–7^{(1–7)}, 1–6
Win	5–6	Jan 2017	Chennai Open, India	ATP 250	Hard	(Russia) Daniil Medvedev	6–3, 6–4
Win	6–6	Aug 2017	Winston-Salem Open, US	ATP 250	Hard	(Bosnia and Herzegovina) Damir Džumhur	6–4, 6–4
Win	7–6	Jan 2018	Auckland Open, New Zealand (2)	ATP 250	Hard	(Argentina) Juan Martín del Potro	6–1, 4–6, 7–5
Win	8–6	Mar 2018	Dubai Tennis Championships, UAE	ATP 500	Hard	(France) Lucas Pouille	6–3, 6–4
Loss	8–7	Jul 2018	Gstaad Open, Switzerland	ATP 250	Clay	(Italy) Matteo Berrettini	6–7^{(9–11)}, 4–6
Win	9–7	Jan 2019	Qatar Open, Qatar	ATP 250	Hard	(Czech Republic) Tomáš Berdych	6–4, 3–6, 6–3
Loss	9–8	Feb 2021	Open Sud de France, France	ATP 250	Hard (i)	(Belgium) David Goffin	7–5, 4–6, 2–6
Loss	9–9	Mar 2021	Qatar Open, Qatar	ATP 250	Hard	(Georgia (country)) Nikoloz Basilashvili	6–7^{(5–7)}, 2–6
Win	10–9	Feb 2022	Qatar Open, Qatar (2)	ATP 250	Hard	(Georgia (country)) Nikoloz Basilashvili	6–3, 6–4
Loss	10–10	Jun 2022	Mallorca Championships, Spain	ATP 250	Grass	(Greece) Stefanos Tsitsipas	4–6, 6–3, 6–7^{(2–7)}
Win	11–10	Jul 2022	Austrian Open Kitzbühel, Austria	ATP 250	Clay	(Austria) Filip Misolic	6–2, 6–2
Loss	11–11	Jan 2023	Adelaide International 2, Australia	ATP 250	Hard	(South Korea) Kwon Soon-woo	4–6, 6–3, 6–7^{(4–7)}
Win	12–11	Oct 2024	European Open, Belgium	ATP 250	Hard (i)	(Czech Republic) Jiří Lehečka	7–5, 6–1

=== National and international representation ===
Result	Date	Tournament	Surface	Team	Partners (if)	Opponent team	Opponent players	Score
Win	Jul 2009	Mediterranean Games, Pescara	Clay	Spain	–	Turkey	Marsel İlhan	3–1
Win	Nov 2019	Davis Cup, Madrid	Hard (i)	(Spain)	Rafael Nadal; Pablo Carreño Busta; Feliciano López; Marcel Granollers	Canada	Denis Shapovalov; Félix Auger-Aliassime; Vasek Pospisil; Brayden Schnur	2–0
Loss	Jan 2020	ATP Cup, Sydney	Hard	(Spain)	Rafael Nadal; Pablo Carreño Busta; Albert Ramos Viñolas; Feliciano López	Serbia	Novak Djokovic; Dušan Lajović; Nikola Milojević; Viktor Troicki; Nikola Ćaćić	1–2
Loss	Jan 2022	ATP Cup, Sydney	Hard	(Spain)	Pablo Carreño Busta; Albert Ramos Viñolas; Alejandro Davidovich Fokina; Pedro Martínez	Canada	Félix Auger-Aliassime; Denis Shapovalov; Brayden Schnur; Steven Diez	0–2

=== ATP Challenger and ITF Futures finals ===
==== Singles: 21 (13 titles, 8 runner-ups) ====
Legend ATP Challenger Tour (3–3) ITF Futures (10–5)	Finals by surface Hard (7–4) Clay (6–4)

Result	W–L	Date	Tournament	Tier	Surface	Opponent	Score
Loss	0–1	Jul 2010	Pozoblanco Open, Spain	Challenger	Hard	(Spain) Rubén Ramírez Hidalgo	6–7^{(6–8)}, 4–6
Loss	0–2	May 2011	Alessandria Challenger, Italy	Challenger	Clay	(Spain) Pablo Carreño Busta	6–3, 3–6, 5–7
Win	1–2	Apr 2012	Rai Open, Italy	Challenger	Clay	(Portugal) Rui Machado	6–7^{(7–9)}, 6–4, 6–3
Win	2–2	Jul 2012	Orbetello Challenger, Italy	Challenger	Clay	(Serbia) Dušan Lajović	6–3, 6–1
Win	3–2	Aug 2012	Pozoblanco Open, Spain	Challenger	Hard	(Spain) Arnau Brugués Davi	6–3, 6–4
Loss	3–3	Nov 2023	Copa Faulcombridge, Spain	Challenger	Clay	(Italy) Fabio Fognini	6–3, 6–7^{(8–10)}, 6–7^{(3–7)}

Result	W–L	Date	Tournament	Tier	Surface	Opponent	Score
Win	1–0	Jun 2007	F24 Málaga, Spain	Futures	Clay	(Spain) Pedro Clar-Rosselló	7–5, 6–3
Win	2–0	Aug 2007	F29 Xàtiva, Spain	Futures	Clay	(Spain) Pedro Clar-Rosselló	6–3, 6–4
Loss	2–1	Aug 2007	F30 Bakio, Spain	Futures	Hard	(Germany) Tony Holzinger	6–1, 4–6, 2–6
Loss	2–2	Jul 2008	F27 Gandia, Spain	Futures	Clay	(Spain) Íñigo Cervantes	6–4, 5–7, 1–6
Win	3–2	Aug 2008	F29 Xàtiva, Spain	Futures	Clay	(Spain) Gerard Granollers	6–4, 6–4
Win	4–2	Sep 2008	F36 Martos, Spain	Futures	Hard	(United Kingdom) James Ward	3–6, 6–3, 6–2
Win	5–2	Oct 2008	F37 Córdoba, Spain	Futures	Hard	(France) Jean-Noël Insausti	6–7^{(5–7)}, 6–3, 6–4
Loss	5–3	Mar 2009	F9 Badalona, Spain	Futures	Clay	(Spain) Albert Ramos Viñolas	4–6, 4–6
Win	6–3	Mar 2009	F10 Castelldefels, Spain	Futures	Clay	(Spain) Marc Fornell Mestres	6–4, 6–4
Loss	6–4	Jun 2009	F19 Lanzarote, Spain	Futures	Hard	(Spain) José Checa Calvo	1–6, 4–6
Win	7–4	Sep 2009	F32 Madrid, Spain	Futures	Hard	(Netherlands) Thomas Schoorel	6–4, 6–3
Loss	7–5	Oct 2009	F33 Martos, Spain	Futures	Hard	(Belarus) Uladzimir Ignatik	1–6, 6–3, 6–7^{(3–7)}
Win	8–5	Jan 2010	F3 Murcia, Spain	Futures	Hard	(Spain) Sergio Gutiérrez Ferrol	7–5, 6–2
Win	9–5	Mar 2010	F3 Tipton, UK	Futures	Hard (i)	(United Kingdom) Daniel Smethurst	7–5, 6–4
Win	10–5	Sep 2010	F33 Móstoles, Spain	Futures	Hard	(Canada) Philip Bester	6–7^{(4–7)}, 6–4, 6–2

==== Doubles: 2 (2 runner-ups) ====
Legend ATP Challenger Tour (0–1) ITF Futures (0–1)

Result	W–L	Date	Tournament	Tier	Surface	Partner	Opponents	Score
Loss	0–1	Sep 2011	Ljubljana Open, Slovenia	Challenger	Clay	(Spain) Iván Navarro	(Slovenia) Aljaž Bedene (Slovenia) Grega Žemlja	3–6, 7–6^{(12–10)}, [10–12]

Result	W–L	Date	Tournament	Tier	Surface	Partner	Opponents	Score
Loss	0–1	Mar 2009	F8 Sabadell, Spain	Futures	Clay	(Germany) Cedrik-Marcel Stebe	(Spain) Sergio Gutiérrez Ferrol (Netherlands) Boy Westerhof	2–6, 4–6

=== Wins against top 10 players ===
- Bautista Agut has a 22–68 record against players who were ranked in the top 10 at the time the match was played.

Season	2013	2014	2015	2016	2017	2018	2019	2020	2021	2022	2023	2024	2025	Total
Wins	1	2	0	3	1	0	4	1	3	3	2	1	1	22

#	Player	Rk	Event	Surface	Rd	Score	Rk	Ref
2013
1.	(Czech Republic) Tomáš Berdych	6	Chennai Open, India	Hard	QF	7–5, 2–6, 6–3	80	
2014
2.	(Argentina) Juan Martín del Potro	5	Australian Open, Australia	Hard	2R	4–6, 6–3, 5–7, 6–4, 7–5	62	
3.	(Czech Republic) Tomáš Berdych	5	Indian Wells Open, United States	Hard	2R	4–6, 6–2, 6–4	53	
2016
4.	(France) Jo-Wilfried Tsonga	10	Auckland Open, New Zealand	Hard	SF	3–6, 7–6^{(7–3)}, 6–4	25	
5.	(France) Jo-Wilfried Tsonga	9	Miami Open, United States	Hard	3R	2–6, 6–3, 7–6^{(7–3)}	18	
6.	(Serbia) Novak Djokovic	1	Shanghai Masters, China	Hard	SF	6–4, 6–4	19	
2017
7.	(Japan) Kei Nishikori	9	Wimbledon, United Kingdom	Grass	3R	6–4, 7–6^{(7–3)}, 3–6, 6–3	19	
2019
8.	(Serbia) Novak Djokovic	1	Qatar Open, Qatar	Hard	SF	3–6, 7–6^{(8–6)}, 6–4	24	
9.	(Croatia) Marin Čilić	7	Australian Open, Australia	Hard	4R	6–7^{(6–8)}, 6–3, 6–2, 4–6, 6–4	24	
10.	(Serbia) Novak Djokovic	1	Miami Open, United States	Hard	4R	1–6, 7–5, 6–3	25	
11.	(Russia) Karen Khachanov	9	Wimbledon, United Kingdom	Grass	3R	6–3, 7–6^{(7–3)}, 6–1	22	
2020
12.	(Russia) Daniil Medvedev	5	Cincinnati Open, United States	Hard	QF	1–6, 6–4, 6–3	12	
2021
13.	(Austria) Dominic Thiem	4	Qatar Open, Qatar	Hard	QF	7–6^{(7–3)}, 2–6, 6–4	13	
14.	(Russia) Andrey Rublev	8	Qatar Open, Qatar	Hard	SF	6–3, 6–3	13	
15.	(Russia) Daniil Medvedev	2	Miami Open, United States	Hard	QF	6–4, 6–2	12	
2022
16.	(Norway) Casper Ruud	8	ATP Cup, Australia	Hard	RR	6–4, 7–6^{(7–4)}	19	
17.	(Poland) Hubert Hurkacz	9	ATP Cup, Australia	Hard	SF	7–6^{(8–6)}, 2–6, 7–6^{(7–5)}	19	
18.	Daniil Medvedev	1	Mallorca Championships, Spain	Grass	QF	6–3, 6–2	20	
2023
19.	Andrey Rublev	8	Adelaide International 1, Australia	Hard	1R	4–6, 6–3, 6–4	21	
20.	Daniil Medvedev	3	Halle Open, Germany	Grass	QF	7–5, 7–6^{(7–3)}	23	
2024
21.	(Norway) Casper Ruud	8	Swiss Indoors, Switzerland	Hard (i)	1R	6–3, 3–6, 6–3	45	
2025
22.	(Denmark) Holger Rune	9	Queen's Club, United Kingdom	Grass	QF	7–6^{(7–5)}, 6–7^{(4–7)}, 6–2	51	

- Key: (Rk) first use, opponent rank; (Rd) round; (Rk) 2nd use, player rank; (Ref) reference; (F) final; (SF) semifinal; (QF) quarterfinal; (#R) rounds 4, 3, 2, 1; (RR) round-robin stage; (Q#) qualifying rounds or stages (3), 2, 1.

== See also ==
- Spain Davis Cup team
- List of Spain Davis Cup team representatives
- Tennis in Spain
- Sport in Spain

== Notes ==
Awards
Preceded by (Spain) Pablo Carreño Busta	ATP Most Improved Player; 2014	Succeeded by (South Korea) Chung Hyeon
