= BMW Ljubljana Open =

Tournament information
- Event name: Zavarovalnica Sava Ljubljana
- Location: Domžale / Ljubljana, Slovenia
- Venue: Ten-Ten Domžale (ATP 1990–2000); TC Tivoli (ATP 2002–05, WTA 2023–); TC ZTK Ljubljana (ATP 2007–11)
- Surface: Clay

Current champions (2026)
- Women's singles: (Italy) Samira De Stefano
- Women's doubles: (Croatia) Lucija Ćirić Bagarić (Italy) Angelica Moratelli
ATP Tour
- Category: ATP Challenger
- Draw: 32S/30Q/16D
- Prize money: €42,500 (2011)
WTA Tour
- Category: WTA 125
- Draw: 32S / 16Q / 16D
- Prize money: €100,000 (2026)

The BMW Ljubljana Open is a professional tennis tournament played on outdoor clay courts. It is currently part of the WTA 125 series of the WTA Tour. In the past, the Association of Tennis Professionals (ATP) organized an ATP Challenger which was last held in 2011. The tournament was first held in 1990 in Domžale, Slovenia (former Yugoslavia), before moving to Ljubljana from 2002.

== Past finals ==
=== Men's singles ===
Location	Year	Champion	Runner-up	Score
BMW Ljubljana Open
Ljubljana	2011	(Italy) Paolo Lorenzi	(Slovenia) Grega Žemlja	6–2, 6–4
Ljubljana	2010	(Slovenia) Blaž Kavčič	(Belgium) David Goffin	6–2, 4–6, 7–5
Ljubljana	2009	(Italy) Paolo Lorenzi	(Slovenia) Grega Žemlja	1–6, 7–6^{(7–4)}, 6–2
Ljubljana	2008	(Serbia) Ilija Bozoljac	(Italy) Giancarlo Petrazzuolo	6–4, 6–3
Ljubljana	2007	(Austria) Marco Mirnegg	(France) Mathieu Montcourt	7–6^{(7–5)}, 7–5
Ljubljana Open
Ljubljana	2005	(Spain) Rubén Ramírez Hidalgo	(Italy) Massimo Dell'Acqua	6–7^{(2–7)}, 5–2, ret.
Ljubljana	2004	(Czech Republic) Jiří Vaněk	(Germany) Björn Phau	5–7, 6–1, 7–6^{(7–5)}
Ljubljana	2003	(Czech Republic) Jiří Vaněk	(Serbia) Boris Pašanski	6–3, 3–6, 6–1
Ljubljana	2002	(France) Arnaud Di Pasquale	(Spain) Juan Balcells	6–4, 6–3
Renault Slovenian Open
Ljubljana	2000	(Germany) Oliver Gross	(Spain) Juan Balcells	4–6, 6–1, 7–6^{(7–3)}
Domžale	1999	(Belarus) Vladimir Voltchkov	(Romania) Dinu Pescariu	7–5, 6–7^{(3–7)}, 6–4
Domžale	1998	(Romania) Dinu Pescariu	(Romania) Adrian Voinea	7–6, 2–6, 6–3
Domžale	1997	(New Zealand) Brett Steven	(Romania) Andrei Pavel	7–6, 6–2
Domžale	1996	(Morocco) Hicham Arazi	(Uruguay) Marcelo Filippini	4–6, 6–2, 6–4
Domžale	1995	(Spain) Jordi Burillo	(Romania) Adrian Voinea	6–2, 6–1
Domžale	1994	(Austria) Horst Skoff	(Spain) Tomás Carbonell	0–6, 6–4, 7–6
Domžale	1993	(Argentina) Daniel Orsanic	(Russia) Andrei Cherkasov	4–6, 6–2, 7–5
Domžale	1992	(Sweden) Magnus Larsson	(Sweden) Mikael Tillström	6–4, 6–4
Domžale	1991	(Socialist Federal Republic of Yugoslavia) Slobodan Živojinović	(Russia) Andrei Olhovskiy	6–7, 7–6, 6–3
Domžale	1990	(Sweden) Magnus Larsson	(Italy) Diego Nargiso	7–5, 6–7, 7–6

=== Women's singles ===
Location	Year	Champion	Runner-up	Score
Zavarovalnica Sava Ljubljana
Ljubljana	2023	(Spain) Marina Bassols Ribera	(Turkey) Zeynep Sönmez	6–0, 7–6^{(7–2)}
Ljubljana	2024	(Switzerland) Jil Teichmann	(Spain) Nuria Párrizas Díaz	7–6^{(10–8)}, 6–4
Ljubljana	2025	(Slovenia) Kaja Juvan	(Switzerland) Simona Waltert	6–4, 6–4
Zavarovalnica Triglav Ljubljana
Ljubljana	2026	(Italy) Samira De Stefano	(Germany) Mona Barthel	3–6, 6–1, 7–5

=== Men's doubles ===
Location	Year	Champions	Runners-up	Score
BMW Ljubljana Open
Ljubljana	2011	(Slovenia) Aljaž Bedene (Slovenia) Grega Žemlja	(Spain) Roberto Bautista Agut (Spain) Iván Navarro	6–3, 6–7^{(10–12)}, [12–10]
Ljubljana	2010	(Croatia) Nikola Mektić (Croatia) Ivan Zovko	(Croatia) Marin Draganja (Croatia) Dino Marcan	3–6, 6–0, [10–3]
Ljubljana	2009	(United Kingdom) Jamie Delgado (United Kingdom) Jamie Murray	(France) Stéphane Robert (Italy) Simone Vagnozzi	6–3, 6–3
Ljubljana	2008	(Argentina) Juan Pablo Brzezicki (Argentina) Mariano Hood	(Australia) Rameez Junaid (Germany) Philipp Marx	7–5, 7–6^{(7–4)}
Ljubljana	2007	(Russia) Alexander Kudryavtsev (Russia) Alexandre Krasnoroutskiy	(Croatia) Ivan Dodig (Croatia) Lovro Zovko	7–6^{(11–9)}, 1–6, [10–6]
Ljubljana	2005	(Australia) Paul Baccanello (Croatia) Lovro Zovko	(Australia) Andrew Derer (Australia) Joseph Sirianni	6–3, 6–3
Name of event not clear
Ljubljana	2004	(South Africa) Rik de Voest (Ecuador) Giovanni Lapentti	(Sweden) Robert Lindstedt (United States) Michael Russell	6–3, 6–4
Ljubljana	2003	(Italy) Leonardo Azzaro (Hungary) Gergely Kisgyörgy	(Croatia) Ivan Cerović (Serbia) Aleksander Slović	7–6^{(7–3)}, 6–3
Ljubljana	2002	(Argentina) Mariano Hood (Argentina) Edgardo Massa	(Peru) Luis Horna (Argentina) Sebastián Prieto	7–5, 6–1
Renault Slovenian Open
Ljubljana	2000	(Spain) Emilio Benfele Álvarez (Spain) Álex López Morón	(South Africa) Paul Rosner (South Africa) Jason Weir-Smith	6–3, 6–4
Domžale	1999	(Italy) Massimo Valeri (Belgium) Tom Vanhoudt	(Spain) Eduardo Nicolás (Spain) Germán Puentes-Alcañiz	7–6^{(10–8)}, 6–4
Domžale	1998	(South Africa) Marius Barnard (Netherlands) Stephen Noteboom	(Spain) Alberto Martín (Czech Republic) Tomáš Anzari	7–6, 6–7, 7–6
Domžale	1997	(Argentina) Lucas Arnold Ker (Argentina) Daniel Orsanic	(Czech Republic) David Škoch (Netherlands) Fernon Wibier	6–0, 6–4
Domžale	1996	(Argentina) Pablo Albano (Argentina) Lucas Arnold Ker	(Sweden) Rikard Bergh (United States) Shelby Cannon	6–1, 3–6, 6–1
Domžale	1995	(Sweden) Nicklas Kulti (Sweden) Mikael Tillström	(United States) Shelby Cannon (South Africa) Stefan Kruger	6–4, 6–4
Domžale	1994	(France) Olivier Delaître (France) Jean-Philippe Fleurian	(Denmark) Kenneth Carlsen (Sweden) Mikael Tillström	6–1, 4–6, 6–1
Domžale	1993	(Slovakia) Branislav Stanković (Czech Republic) Richard Vogel	(Netherlands) Hendrik Jan Davids (Croatia) Goran Prpić	6–4, 7–6
Domžale	1992	(Sweden) Magnus Larsson (Sweden) Mikael Tillström	(Italy) Cristian Brandi (Italy) Federico Mordegan	6–3, 6–2
Domžale	1991	(Russia) Andrei Olhovskiy (Socialist Federal Republic of Yugoslavia) Slobodan Živojinović	(Czech Republic) Richard Vogel (Czech Republic) Daniel Vacek	7–5, 6–3
Domžale	1990	(Spain) Carlos Costa (Spain) Francisco Roig	(Italy) Omar Camporese (Netherlands) Mark Koevermans	6–7, 6–4, 6–4

=== Women's doubles ===
Year	Champions	Runners-up	Score
Zavarovalnica Sava Ljubljana
2023	Amina Anshba (United States) Quinn Gleason	(United Kingdom) Freya Christie (Colombia) Yuliana Lizarazo	6–3, 6–4
2024	(Italy) Nuria Brancaccio (Spain) Leyre Romero Gormaz	(North Macedonia) Lina Gjorcheska (Switzerland) Jil Teichmann	5–7, 7–5, [10–7]
2025	(Czech Republic) Miriam Škoch (Switzerland) Simona Waltert	(Slovenia) Dalila Jakupović (Slovenia) Nika Radišić	6–2, 6–2
Zavarovalnica Triglav Ljubljana
2026	(Croatia) Lucija Ćirić Bagarić (Italy) Angelica Moratelli	(France) Estelle Cascino (China) Feng Shuo	6–7^{(4–7)}, 6–4, [10–5]

== See also ==
- WTA Slovenia Open
- Tilia Slovenia Open
- Infond Open
- Koper Open
