= Janez Semrajc =

Slovenian tennis player

- Country (sports): Slovenia
- Residence: Ljubljana, Slovenia
- Born: July 24, 1989 (age 35); Ljubljana, Slovenia
- Plays: Right-handed
- Prize money: $67,543

Singles
- Career record: 4–1
- Career titles: 0
- Highest ranking: No. 262 (16 June 2014)
- Current ranking: No. 348 (17 August 2015)

Doubles
- Career record: 0–0
- Career titles: 0
- Highest ranking: No. 605 (6 October 2014)
- Current ranking: No. 605 (6 October 2014)
- Last updated on: 17 August 2015.

Janez Semrajc (born 24 July 1989) is a Slovenian professional tennis player who currently competes on the ITF Men's Circuit. In June 2014, he achieved a career-high singles world ranking no. 262. He has played for the Slovenia Davis Cup team.

== See also ==
- Slovenia Davis Cup team
