= Tilen Žitnik =

Slovenian tennis player

- Country (sports): Slovenia
- Born: 2 July 1991 (age 34)
- Prize money: $6,990

Singles
- Career record: 0–2 (at ATP Tour level, Grand Slam level, and in Davis Cup)
- Career titles: 0
- Highest ranking: No. 1490 (6 January 2014)
- Current ranking: No. 1676 (31 July 2017)

Doubles
- Career record: 0–0 (at ATP Tour level, Grand Slam level, and in Davis Cup)
- Career titles: 0
- Highest ranking: No. 1033 (24 October 2011)
- Last updated on: 31 July 2017.

Tilen Žitnik (born 2 July 1991) is a Slovenian tennis player.

Žitnik has a career high ATP singles ranking of 1490 achieved on 6 January 2014. He also has a career high ATP doubles ranking of 1033 achieved on 24 October 2011.

Žitnik represents Slovenia at the Davis Cup where he has a W/L record of 0–2.
