= Grega Žemlja =

Slovenian tennis player

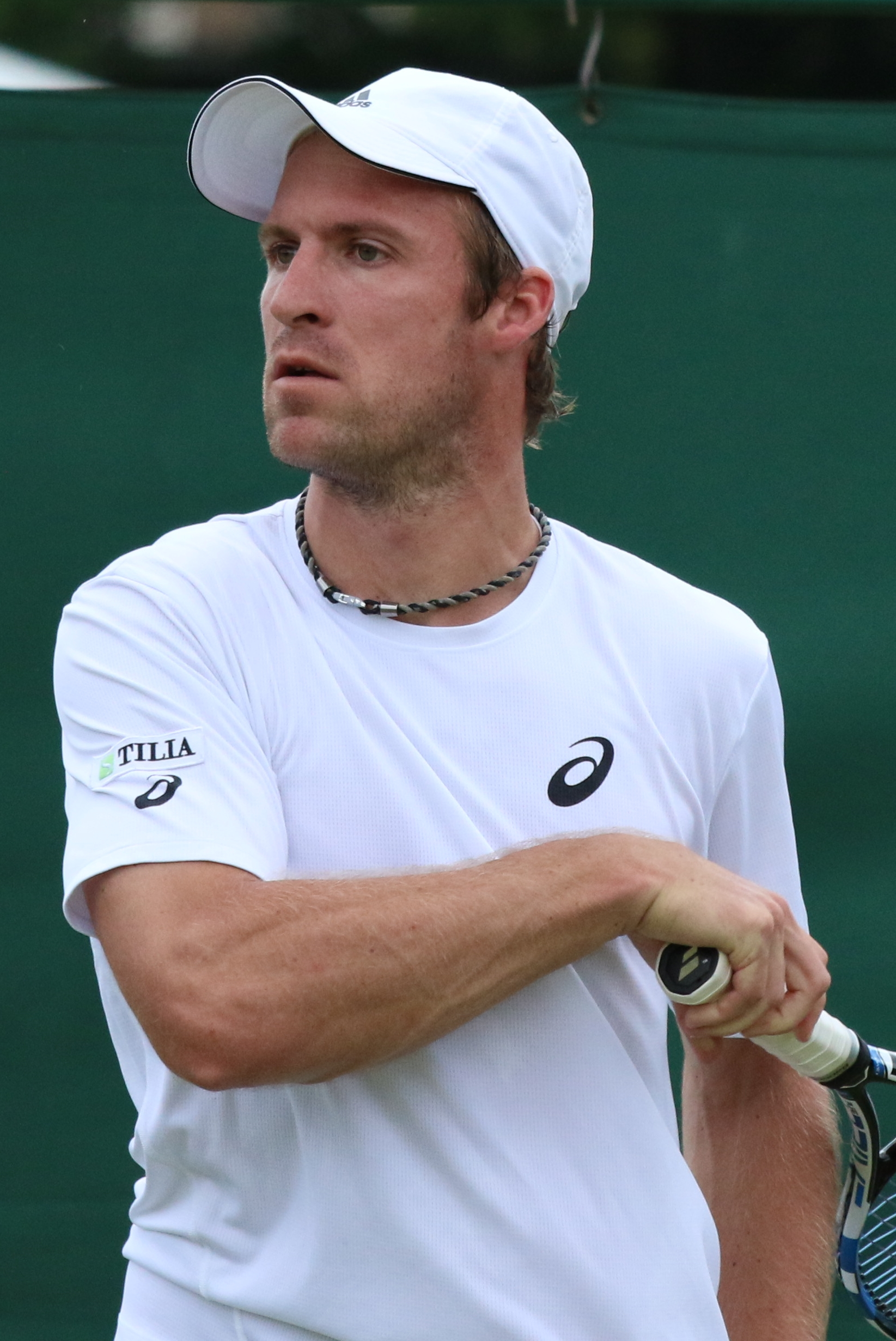
- Country (sports): Slovenia
- Residence: Kranj, Slovenia
- Born: 29 September 1986 (age 39) Jesenice, SFR Yugoslavia
- Height: 1.83 m (6 ft 0 in)
- Turned pro: 2004
- Retired: 2017
- Plays: Right-handed (two-handed backhand)
- Coach: Žiga Janškovec
- Prize money: $1,242,858
- Official website: grega-zemlja.com

Singles
- Career record: 49–52
- Career titles: 0
- Highest ranking: No. 43 (15 July 2013)

Grand Slam singles results
- Australian Open: 1R (2010, 2011, 2013)
- French Open: 2R (2010, 2013)
- Wimbledon: 3R (2013)
- US Open: 3R (2012)

Doubles
- Career record: 15–24
- Career titles: 0
- Highest ranking: No. 252 (21 November 2011)

Grand Slam doubles results
- Australian Open: 1R (2013)
- French Open: 2R (2013)
- Wimbledon: 1R (2013)
- US Open: 1R (2013)

Grega Žemlja (born 29 September 1986) is a Slovenian former tennis player. He won six singles titles and two doubles title on the ATP Challenger Tour. In 2012, he reached the third round of the US Open, the first Slovenian male player ever to reach that stage in a Grand Slam tournament. He is also the first Slovenian ATP player who in 2013 reached third round at Wimbledon. He reached his highest ATP ranking of world No. 43 in singles in May 2013, becoming the first Slovene ATP player to reach the top 50. Žemlja also became the first Slovene player earning over 1 million US dollars in prize money, and he was the highest-paid Slovene player in history until he was passed by Blaž Kavčič. He represented his country as a member of Slovenia Davis Cup team.

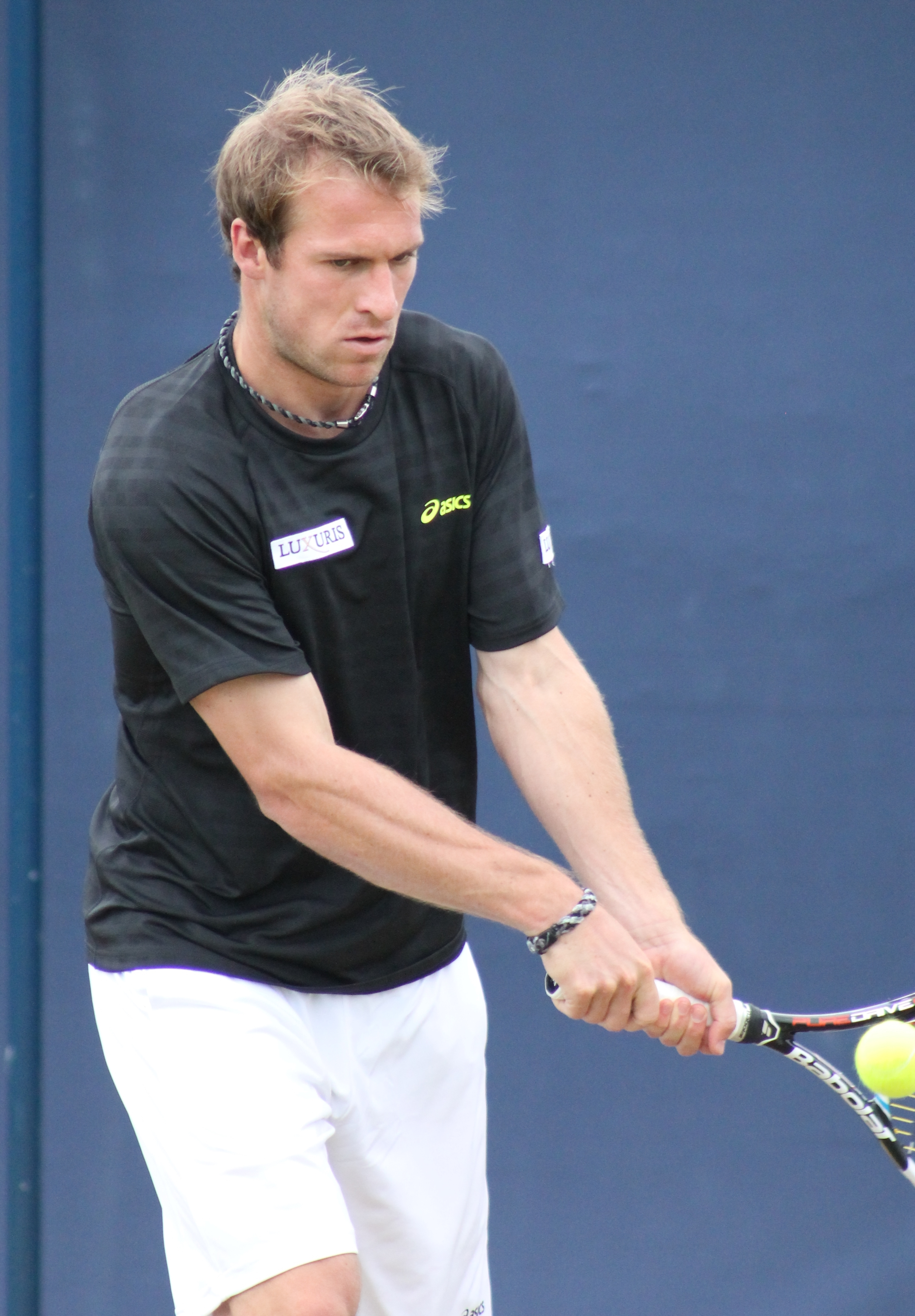
Zemlja, 2013

== Tennis career ==
=== 2009 ===
2009 was Žemlja's first year at the main draw on the ATP Tour. For the first time in his career he qualified for the main draw of Wimbledon where he lost in first round against Albert Montañés. He was the second Slovenian male player ever to play in the main draw of the Grand Slam tournament.

=== 2010 ===
For the first time in his career he qualified for the main draw of the Australian Open where he lost in first round against Benjamin Becker. He became the first ever Slovenian male player to play in the main draw of Australian Open. Žemlja qualified for the 2010 French Open and scored an upset over the No. 26 seed Juan Mónaco, in his first ever Grand Slam victory. He became the first Slovenian male player to win a single match in the Grand Slam tournament. He also became the first Slovenian male player to perform in three different Grand Slam tournaments on three different surfaces.

For the first time in his career he participated in the ATP World Tour 500 series tournament at 2010 Legg Mason Tennis Classic in Washington, D.C. where he lost the second round match against Andy Roddick. Together with Slovenia Davis Cup Team he won the 2010 Davis Cup Europe/Africa Zone Group II, ensuring Slovenia to advance to Europe/Africa Zone Group I.

=== 2011 ===
For the second consecutive year, he qualified for the main draw of Australian Open where he lost the first round match against Marcos Baghdatis in five sets. As a lucky loser, he also qualified for the 2011 Wimbledon Championships. He became the first Slovenian male player to win a single match in the main draw of Wimbledon, but lost his second round match against Gaël Monfils.

=== 2012 ===
He played at 2012 Qatar Open in Doha and lost in straight sets against Roger Federer in second round. He received a wild card to participate in the 2012 Wimbledon Championships, where he lost the second round match against Fernando Verdasco.

On 6 August 2012, he entered the top 100 of the ATP rankings. For the first time in his career he qualified for the main draw of the US Open. Beating Ricardo Mello and Cedrik-Marcel Stebe in first two rounds, he became the first Slovenian male player ever to reach the third round of the Grand Slam tournament. In the third round he lost against Janko Tipsarević. At 2012 Erste Bank Open tournament in Vienna, Austria, he reached his and Slovenian first male historic ATP Final, where he lost to Juan Martín del Potro. With that result he became the first Slovenian male tennis player to reach TOP 50 on ATP rankings.

=== 2013 ===
At 2013 Australian Open for the first time he directly entered Grand Slam tournament. He retired in the first round against Marcel Granollers. He also played his first men's doubles Grand Slam tournament.

He played against Roger Federer for the second time in his career in Rotterdam at 2013 ABN AMRO World Tennis Tournament of ATP 500 series. He lost in two sets in the first round. For the first time in his career he played in main draw of ATP 1000 Masters series at 2013 Miami Masters. As a first Slovenian he reached the third round and lost in two sets against Gilles Simon.

At 2013 French Open he reached second round where he lost in four sets against Kei Nishikori. In men's doubles partnering Aljaž Bedene they lost in two sets against Aisam-ul-Haq Qureshi/Jean-Julien Rojer in the second round. This is the first historic win in the first round of Grand Slam Slovenian men's doubles and first Slovene men's doubles performance in the French Open.

At 2013 Wimbledon Championships, he beat Michael Russell and 29th seed Grigor Dimitrov, becoming the first Slovene player in the third round of Wimbledon, where he lost in straight sets to Juan Martín del Potro. Partnering Aljaž Bedene in the first round of men's doubles they lost against Sanchai Ratiwatana and Sonchat Ratiwatana. This was the first Slovene men's doubles team at Wimbledon.

== ATP career finals ==
=== Singles: 1 (1 runner-up) ===
Legend (singles) Grand Slam tournaments(0–0) ATP World Tour Finals (0–0) ATP World Tour Masters 1000 (0–0) ATP World Tour 500 Series (0–0) ATP World Tour 250 Series (0–1)	Titles by surface Hard (0–1) Clay (0–0) Grass (0–0) Carpet (0–0)

Result	W–L	Date	Tournament	Tier	Surface	Opponent	Score
Loss	0–1	Oct 2012	Vienna Open, Austria	250 Series	Hard (i)	(Argentina) Juan Martín del Potro	5–7, 3–6

== ATP Challenger and ITF Futures finals ==
=== Singles: 38 (17–21) ===
Legend ATP Challenger (6–13) ITF Futures (11–8)	Finals by surface Hard (7–11) Clay (9–10) Grass (1–0) Carpet (0–0)

Result	W–L	Date	Tournament	Tier	Surface	Opponent	Score
Win	1–0	Jun 2004	Slovenia F2, Maribor	Futures	Clay	(Argentina) Carlos Berlocq	6–7^{(1–7)}, 6–3, 6–4
Loss	1–1	May 2005	Hungary F1, Budapest	Futures	Clay	(Hungary) Sebő Kiss	1–6, 2–6
Loss	1–2	May 2005	Bosnia & Herzegovina F1, Sarajevo	Futures	Clay	(Serbia and Montenegro) Ilija Bozoljac	4–6, 3–6
Win	2–2	Jun 2005	Slovenia F1, Kranj	Futures	Clay	(Czech Republic) Roman Vögeli	7–6^{(7–4)}, 6–3
Win	3–2	Jun 2005	Slovenia F2, Maribor	Futures	Clay	(Croatia) Vilim Visak	6–1, 7–5
Win	4–2	Jun 2005	Slovenia F3, Koper	Futures	Clay	(Italy) Marco Pedrini	6–7^{(2–7)}, 6–4, 6–4
Loss	4–3	May 2006	Bosnia & Herzegovina F1, Sarajevo	Futures	Clay	(Spain) Cesar Ferrer-Victoria	3–6, 6–7^{(6–8)}
Win	5–3	Jun 2006	Slovenia F1, Portorož	Futures	Hard	(Denmark) Rasmus Nørby	6–1, 6–0
Loss	5–4	Sep 2006	Germany F15, Kempten	Futures	Clay	(Germany) Tobias Summerer	4–6, 4–6
Loss	5–5	Oct 2006	Portugal F5, Ponta Delgada	Futures	Hard	(Croatia) Vjekoslav Skenderovic	4–6, 1–6
Loss	5–6	Feb 2007	Australia F1, Wollongong	Futures	Hard	(Australia) Robert Smeets	5–7, 1–6
Win	6–6	Oct 2007	Germany F19, Leimen	Futures	Hard	(Germany) Marcel Zimmermann	6–3, 7–5
Win	7–6	Mar 2008	Croatia F3, Poreč	Futures	Clay	(Italy) Andrea Arnaboldi	7–6^{(7–4)}, 6–1
Win	8–6	Jun 2008	Slovenia F1, Krško	Futures	Clay	(Germany) Marcel Zimmermann	4–6, 6–4, 6–1
Win	9–6	Jun 2008	Slovenia F3, Koper	Futures	Clay	(Slovenia) Blaž Kavčič	2–6, 6–1, 6–2
Loss	9–7	Jun 2008	Recanati, Italy	Challenger	Hard	(Argentina) Horacio Zeballos	3–6, 4–6
Loss	9–8	Oct 2008	Croatia F10, Dubrovnik	Futures	Clay	(Italy) Simone Vagnozzi	3–6, 4–6
Win	10–8	Nov 2008	Cancún, Mexico	Challenger	Clay	(Argentina) Martín Alund	6–2, 6–1
Loss	10–9	Feb 2009	Burnie, Australia	Challenger	Hard	(Australia) Brydan Klein	3–6, 3–6
Loss	10–10	Sep 2009	Ljubljana, Slovenia	Challenger	Clay	(Italy) Paolo Lorenzi	6–1, 6–7^{(4–7)}, 2–6
Loss	10–11	Nov 2009	Cancún, Mexico	Challenger	Clay	(Chile) Nicolás Massú	3–6, 5–7
Loss	10–12	Jan 2010	Honolulu, United States	Challenger	Hard	(United States) Michael Russell	0–6, 3–6
Win	11–12	Feb 2011	Caloundra, Australia	Challenger	Hard	(Australia) Bernard Tomic	7–6^{(7–4)}, 6–3
Loss	11–13	Jun 2011	Rijeka, Croatia	Challenger	Clay	(Portugal) Rui Machado	3–6, 0–6
Loss	11–14	Sep 2011	Ljubljana, Slovenia	Challenger	Clay	(Italy) Paolo Lorenzi	2–6, 4–6
Loss	11–15	Nov 2011	Salzburg, Austria	Challenger	Hard	(France) Benoît Paire	7–6^{(8–6)}, 4–6, 4–6
Win	12–15	Jun 2012	Nottingham, United Kingdom	Challenger	Grass	(Slovakia) Karol Beck	7–6^{(7–3)}, 4–6, 6–4
Win	13–15	Jul 2012	Anning, China	Challenger	Clay	(Slovenia) Aljaž Bedene	1–6, 7–5, 6–3
Win	14–15	Aug 2012	Beijing, China	Challenger	Hard	(China) Wu Di	6–3, 6–0
Win	15–15	Jul 2013	Portorož, Slovenia	Challenger	Hard	(Austria) Martin Fischer	6–4, 7–5
Loss	15–16	Feb 2015	Iran F4, Kish	Futures	Hard	(France) Jules Marie	1–6, 4–6
Win	16–16	Mar 2015	Iran F5, Kish	Futures	Hard	(France) Jules Marie	6–3, 6–3
Win	17–16	Apr 2015	China F4, Yuxi	Futures	Hard	(South Korea) Kim Cheong-Eui	7–6^{(7–4)}, 6–3
Loss	17–17	Aug 2015	Portorož, Slovenia	Challenger	Hard	(Italy) Luca Vanni	3–6, 6–7^{(6–8)}
Loss	17–18	Oct 2015	Las Vegas, United States	Challenger	Hard	(Netherlands) Thiemo de Bakker	6–3, 3–6, 1–6
Loss	17–19	Apr 2016	Gwangju, South Korea	Challenger	Hard	(Lithuania) Ričardas Berankis	3–6, 2–6
Loss	17–20	Apr 2016	Nanjing, China	Challenger	Clay	(Lithuania) Ričardas Berankis	3–6, 4–6
Loss	17–21	Oct 2016	Traralgon, Australia	Challenger	Hard	(Australia) Jordan Thompson	1–6, 2–6

=== Doubles: 14 (5–9) ===
Legend ATP Challenger (2–1) ITF Futures (3–8)	Finals by surface Hard (3–3) Clay (2–6) Grass (0–0) Carpet (0–0)

Result	W–L	Date	Tournament	Tier	Surface	Partner	Opponents	Score
Loss	0–1	Jun 2004	Slovenia F2, Maribor	Futures	Clay	(Slovenia) Rok Jarc	(Spain) Germán Puentes-Alcaniz (Spain) Antonio Baldellou-Esteva	2–6, 1–6
Loss	0–2	Aug 2004	Serbia & Montenegro F6, Niš	Futures	Clay	(Slovenia) Rok Jarc	(Serbia and Montenegro) Nikola Ćirić (Serbia and Montenegro) Goran Tošić	0–1 ret.
Win	1–2	Nov 2004	Tunisia F5, Monastir	Futures	Hard	(Slovenia) Bostjan Osabnik	(Poland) Maciej Diłaj (Poland) Piotr Dilaj	7–6^{(7–3)}, 6–3
Loss	1–3	Dec 2004	Tunisia F6, Mégrine	Futures	Hard	(Slovenia) Bostjan Osabnik	(Tunisia) Haythem Abid (Tunisia) Malek Jaziri	6–7^{(3–7)}, 3–6
Loss	1–4	May 2005	Bosnia & Herzegovina F1, Sarajevo	Futures	Clay	(Slovenia) Rok Jarc	(Serbia and Montenegro) Ilija Bozoljac (Serbia and Montenegro) Goran Tošić	3–6, 5–7
Win	2–4	Jun 2005	Slovenia F1, Kranj	Futures	Clay	(Slovenia) Rok Jarc	(Italy) Fabio Colangelo (Italy) Alessandro Da Col	2–6, 7–6^{(8–6)}, 6–3
Win	3–4	Oct 2005	France F17, Saint-Dizier	Futures	Hard	(Slovenia) Rok Jarc	(France) Olivier Charroin (France) Gary Lugassy	3–6, 7–6^{(7–4)}, 6–0
Loss	3–5	Oct 2006	Portugal F4, Albufeira	Futures	Hard	(Slovenia) Blaž Kavčič	(Croatia) Vjekoslav Skenderovic (Croatia) Joško Topić	3–6, 0–6
Loss	3–6	Feb 2007	Australia F1, Wollongong	Futures	Hard	(France) Xavier Audouy	(United States) Alberto Francis (United States) Troy Hahn	6–1, 2–6, 3–6
Loss	3–7	Apr 2007	Italy F11, Padova	Futures	Clay	(Slovenia) Blaž Kavčič	(Argentina) Alejandro Fabbri (Spain) Gabriel Trujillo Soler	6–7^{(5–7)}, 2–6
Loss	3–8	Jun 2010	Marburg, Germany	Challenger	Clay	(Spain) Guillermo Olaso	(Germany) Matthias Bachinger (Germany) Denis Gremelmayr	4–6, 4–6
Win	4–8	Sep 2011	Ljubljana, Slovenia	Challenger	Clay	(Slovenia) Aljaž Bedene	(Spain) Roberto Bautista Agut (Spain) Iván Navarro	6–3, 6–7^{(10–12)}, [12–10]
Loss	4–9	Jun 2012	Slovenia F1, Bled	Futures	Clay	(Slovenia) Aljaž Bedene	(Croatia) Mislav Hizak (Austria) Tristan-Samuel Weissborn	walkover
Win	5–9	Oct 2015	Sacramento, United States	Challenger	Hard	(Slovenia) Blaž Kavčič	(Germany) Daniel Brands (Germany) Dustin Brown	6–1, 3–6, [10–3]

== Performance timeline ==
Key
W	F	SF	QF	#R	RR	Q#	DNQ	A	NH

(W) winner; (F) finalist; (SF) semifinalist; (QF) quarterfinalist; (#R) rounds 4, 3, 2, 1; (RR) round-robin stage; (Q#) qualification round; (DNQ) did not qualify; (A) absent; (NH) not held; (SR) strike rate (events won / competed); (W–L) win–loss record.
To avoid confusion and double counting, these charts are updated at the conclusion of a tournament or when the player's participation has ended.

=== Singles ===
Tournament	2006	2007	2008	2009	2010	2011	2012	2013	2014	2015	2016	2017	SR	W–L	Win%
Grand Slam tournaments
Australian Open	Q1	A	A	Q3	1R	1R	Q2	1R	A	A	Q1	Q1	0 / 3	0–3	0%
French Open	A	A	A	Q1	2R	Q1	Q1	2R	Q1	A	Q2	Q1	0 / 2	2–2	50%
Wimbledon	A	A	A	1R	Q2	2R	2R	3R	Q1	A	Q2	Q2	0 / 4	4–4	50%
US Open	A	Q1	A	Q1	Q1	Q3	3R	1R	A	A	Q1	A	0 / 2	2–2	50%
Win–loss	0–0	0–0	0–0	0–1	1–2	1–2	3–2	3–4	0–0	0–0	0–0	0–0	0 / 11	8–11	42%
ATP Tour Masters 1000
Miami	A	A	A	A	A	Q2	Q1	3R	A	A	Q2	Q1	0 / 1	2–1	67%
Rome	A	A	A	A	A	A	A	Q2	A	A	A	A	0 / 0	0–0	–
Canada	A	A	A	A	Q1	A	A	1R	A	A	A	A	0 / 1	0–1	0%
Cincinnati	A	A	A	A	Q1	A	A	Q2	A	A	A	A	0 / 0	0–0	–
Shanghai	A	A	A	A	Q2	Q1	Q2	A	A	A	A	A	0 / 0	0–0	–
Win–loss	0–0	0–0	0–0	0–0	0–0	0–0	0–0	2–2	0–0	0–0	0–0	0–0	0 / 2	2–2	50%

== Davis Cup ==
=== Singles performances (18–10) ===
Edition	Round	Date	Against	Surface	Opponent	Result	Outcome
2005 Europe/Africa Zone Group II	1R	3-04-2005	Ivory Coast	Hard (I)	(Ivory Coast) Valentin Sanon	6–4, 6–4, 7–5	Win
2005 Europe/Africa Zone Group II	QF	7-15-2005	Latvia	Clay	(Latvia) Ernests Gulbis	5–7, 6–3, 6–1, 6–4	Win
2005 Europe/Africa Zone Group II	SF	9-25-2005	Portugal	Clay	(Portugal) Rui Machado	3–6, 3–6, 6–2, 4–6	Loss
2006 Europe/Africa Zone Group II	1R	4-07-2006	Algeria	Clay	(Algeria) Slimane Saoudi	7–5, 6–2	Win
2006 Europe/Africa Zone Group II	1R	4-09-2006	Algeria	Clay	(Algeria) Lamine Ouahab	3–6, 6–2, 6–4, 3–6, 4–6	Loss
2006 Europe/Africa Zone Group II	RPO	7-21-2006	(Republic of Ireland) Ireland	Grass	(Republic of Ireland) Kevin Sorensen	6–2, 7–5, 6–1	Win
2006 Europe/Africa Zone Group II	RPO	7-23-2006	(Republic of Ireland) Ireland	Grass	(Republic of Ireland) Conor Niland	6–4, 6–2	Win
2007 Europe/Africa Zone Group II	1R	4-06-2007	Estonia	Carpet (I)	(Estonia) Jürgen Zopp	4–6, 6–4, 7–6^{(7–3)}, 6–3	Win
2007 Europe/Africa Zone Group II	1R	4-08-2007	Estonia	Carpet (I)	(Estonia) Mait Künnap	6–3, 6–2, 3–6, 6–7^{(2–7)}, 6–3	Win
2007 Europe/Africa Zone Group II	QF	7-22-2007	Morocco	Hard	(Morocco) Younes El Aynaoui	6–7^{(2–7)}, 2–6, 4–6	Loss
2008 Europe/Africa Zone Group II	RPO	7-18-2008	Tunisia	Clay	(Tunisia) Malek Jaziri	3–6, 6–1, 4–6, 6–3, 6–4	Win
2009 Europe/Africa Zone Group II	1R	3-06-2009	Egypt	Carpet (I)	(Egypt) Sherif Sabry	7–5, 7–6^{(8–6)}, 6–2	Win
2009 Europe/Africa Zone Group II	QF	7-10-2009	Lithuania	Clay	(Lithuania) Ričardas Berankis	6–1, 6–4, 6–3	Win
2009 Europe/Africa Zone Group II	QF	7-12-2009	Lithuania	Clay	(Lithuania) Dovydas Sakinis	6–4, 2–6, 6–1	Win
2009 Europe/Africa Zone Group II	SF	9-18-2009	Latvia	Carpet (I)	(Latvia) Andis Juška	6–1, 6–1, 6–4	Win
2009 Europe/Africa Zone Group II	SF	9-20-2009	Latvia	Carpet (I)	(Latvia) Ernests Gulbis	2–6, 6–3, 3–6, 5–7	Loss
2010 Europe/Africa Zone Group II	1R	3-05-2010	Norway	Hard (I)	(Norway) Erling Tveit	6–2, 6–2, 7–6^{(7–2)}	Win
2010 Europe/Africa Zone Group II	QF	7-09-2010	Bulgaria	Clay	(Bulgaria) Todor Enev	6–2, 6–1	Win
2010 Europe/Africa Zone Group II	SF	9-17-2010	Lithuania	Hard (I)	(Lithuania) Ričardas Berankis	7–6^{(7–2)}, 6–4, 6–3	Win
2010 Europe/Africa Zone Group II	SF	9-19-2010	Lithuania	Hard (I)	(Lithuania) Laurynas Grigelis	6–3, 7–6^{(7–4)}, 6–3	Win
2011 Europe/Africa Zone Group I	1R	3-04-2011	Finland	Clay (I)	(Finland) Jarkko Nieminen	6–3, 3–6, 4–6, 3–6	Loss
2011 Europe/Africa Zone Group I	1R	3-06-2011	Finland	Clay (I)	(Finland) Micke Kontinen	2–6, 6–3, 6–3, 6–3	Win
2011 Europe/Africa Zone Group I	2R	7-08-2011	Italy	Clay	(Italy) Fabio Fognini	6–1, 4–6, 4–6, 4–6	Loss
2011 Europe/Africa Zone Group I	2R	7-10-2011	Italy	Clay	(Italy) Simone Bolelli	5–7, 3–6	Loss
2012 Europe/Africa Zone Group I	1R	2-10-2012	Denmark	Hard (I)	(Denmark) Kristian Pless	6–0, 6–1, 6–4	Win
2012 Europe/Africa Zone Group I	2R	4-06-2012	South Africa	Hard	(South Africa) Izak van der Merwe	1–6, 6–3, 3–6, 4–6	Loss
2013 Europe/Africa Zone Group I	1R	1-02-2013	Poland	Hard (I)	(Poland) Łukasz Kubot	3–6, 2–6, 0–6	Loss
2013 Europe/Africa Zone Group I	1R	3-02-2013	Poland	Hard (I)	(Poland) Jerzy Janowicz	6–7^{(4–7)}, 3–6, 3–6	Loss

=== Doubles performances (11–8) ===
Edition	Round	Date	Partnering	Against	Surface	Opponents	Result	Outcome
2005 Europe/Africa Zone Group II	1R	3-05-2005	(Slovenia) Rok Jarc	Ivory Coast	Hard (I)	(Ivory Coast) Claude N'Goran (Ivory Coast) Valentin Sanon	6–2, 6–2 ret.	Win
2005 Europe/Africa Zone Group II	SF	9-24-2005	(Slovenia) Rok Jarc	Portugal	Clay	(Portugal) Frederico Gil (Portugal) Leonardo Tavares	4–6, 2–6, 4–6	Loss
2006 Europe/Africa Zone Group II	1R	4-08-2006	(Slovenia) Rok Jarc	Algeria	Clay	(Algeria) Lamine Ouahab (Algeria) Slimane Saoudi	2–6, 2–6, 4–6	Loss
2006 Europe/Africa Zone Group II	RPO	7-22-2006	(Slovenia) Luka Gregorc	(Republic of Ireland) Ireland	Grass	(Republic of Ireland) James Cluskey (Republic of Ireland) Stephen Nugent	6–7^{(7–9)}, 6–3, 3–6, 6–3, 7–5	Win
2007 Europe/Africa Zone Group II	1R	4-07-2007	(Slovenia) Luka Gregorc	Estonia	Clay (I)	(Estonia) Mait Künnap (Estonia) Jürgen Zopp	2–6, 6–3, 6–3, 6–7^{(5–7)}, 4–6	Loss
2007 Europe/Africa Zone Group II	QF	7-21-2007	(Slovenia) Luka Gregorc	Morocco	Hard	(Morocco) Reda El Amrani (Morocco) Younes El Aynaoui	6–7^{(2–7)}, 6–4, 6–4, 6–4	Win
2008 Europe/Africa Zone Group II	1R	4-12-2008	(Slovenia) Marko Tkalec	Cyprus	Hard	(Cyprus) Marcos Baghdatis (Cyprus) Photos Kallias	6–7^{(4–7)}, 6–4, 2–6, 6–4, 1–6	Loss
2008 Europe/Africa Zone Group II	RPO	7-19-2008	(Slovenia) Luka Gregorc	Tunisia	Clay	(Tunisia) Haithem Abid (Tunisia) Malek Jaziri	6–3, 5–7, 6–7^{(5–7)}, 5–7	Loss
2009 Europe/Africa Zone Group II	1R	3-07-2009	(Slovenia) Marko Tkalec	Egypt	Carpet (I)	(Egypt) Karim Maamoun (Egypt) Sherif Sabry	6–2, 6–3, 6–3	Win
2009 Europe/Africa Zone Group II	QF	7-19-2009	(Slovenia) Andrej Kračman	Lithuania	Clay	(Lithuania) Ričardas Berankis (Lithuania) Vadim Pinko	7–6^{(7–2)}, 6–3, 6–3	Win
2009 Europe/Africa Zone Group II	SF	9-19-2009	(Slovenia) Luka Gregorc	Latvia	Carpet (I)	(Latvia) Ernests Gulbis (Latvia) Deniss Pavlovs	6–7^{(5–7)}, 6–4, 6–2, 2–6, 6–4	Win
2010 Europe/Africa Zone Group II	1R	3-06-2010	(Slovenia) Luka Gregorc	Norway	Hard (I)	(Norway) Erling Tveit (Norway) Stian Boretti	7–6^{(7–2)}, 7–6^{(7–5)}, 7–5	Win
2010 Europe/Africa Zone Group II	QF	7-10-2010	(Slovenia) Luka Gregorc	Bulgaria	Clay	(Bulgaria) Grigor Dimitrov (Bulgaria) Ivaylo Traykov	6–7^{(3–7)}, 7–6^{(7–2)}, 7–6^{(14–12)}, 6–3	Win
2010 Europe/Africa Zone Group II	SF	9-18-2010	(Slovenia) Luka Gregorc	Lithuania	Hard (I)	(Lithuania) Ričardas Berankis (Lithuania) Laurynas Grigelis	7–5, 6–4, 1–6, 3–6, 3–6	Loss
2011 Europe/Africa Zone Group I	1R	3-05-2011	(Slovenia) Luka Gregorc	Finland	Clay (I)	(Finland) Harri Heliövaara (Finland) Jarkko Nieminen	6–7^{(5–7)}, 6–4, 6–4, 7–5	Win
2011 Europe/Africa Zone Group I	2R	7-09-2011	(Slovenia) Blaž Kavčič	Italy	Clay	(Italy) Simone Bolelli (Italy) Daniele Bracciali	6–7, 6–7, 2–6	Loss
2012 Europe/Africa Zone Group I	1R	2-11-2012	(Slovenia) Blaž Kavčič	Denmark	Hard (I)	(Denmark) Thomas Kromann (Denmark) Frederik Nielsen	6–4, 6–7, 6–4, 7–5	Win
2012 Europe/Africa Zone Group I	2R	4-07-2012	(Slovenia) Blaž Kavčič	South Africa	Hard	(South Africa) Raven Klaasen (South Africa) Izak van der Merwe	7–6^{(7–5)}, 6–7^{(4–7)}, 1–6, 4–6	Loss
2013 Europe/Africa Zone Group I	1R	2-02-2012	(Slovenia) Blaž Kavčič	Poland	Hard (I)	(Poland) Mariusz Fyrstenberg (Poland) Marcin Matkowski	6–3, 2–6, 6–2, 4–6, 13-11	Win
