= 2011 Aguascalientes Open – Singles =

Singles
- 2011 Aguascalientes Open

Final
- Champion: (Colombia) Juan Sebastián Cabal
- Runner-up: (Colombia) Robert Farah
- Score: 6–4, 7–6^{(7–3)}

Events
Singles	Doubles
- Aguascalientes Open

Juan Sebastián Cabal won the first edition of this tournament after defeating his compatriot Robert Farah 6–4, 7–6^{(7–3)} in the final.

== Seeds ==
1. (Argentina) Horacio Zeballos (second round)
2. (Argentina) Máximo González (quarterfinals)
3. (Colombia) Carlos Salamanca (second round)
4. (Argentina) Facundo Bagnis (quarterfinals)
5. (Argentina) Eduardo Schwank (semifinals)
6. (Dominican Republic) Víctor Estrella (first round)
7. (Moldova) Roman Borvanov (quarterfinals)
8. (Colombia) Juan Sebastián Cabal (champion)

== Draw ==
Key

- Q = Qualifier
- WC = Wild card
- LL = Lucky loser
- Alt = Alternate
- ITF = ITF entry
- PR = Protected ranking
- SR = Special ranking
- SE = Special exempt
- JE = Junior exempt
- JR = Junior Accelerator Programme entrant
- CO = College Accelerator Programme entrant
- NG = Next Gen Accelerator Program entrant
- w/o = Walkover
- r = Retired
- d = Defaulted

=== Finals ===
Semifinals
(Colombia) Robert Farah	6	6
5	(Argentina) Eduardo Schwank	1	3
(Italy) Matteo Marrai	6^{4}	7	6^{6}
8	(Colombia) Juan Sebastián Cabal	7^{7}	5	7^{8}

Final
(Colombia) Robert Farah	4	6^{3}
8	(Colombia) Juan Sebastián Cabal	6	7^{7}

=== Top half ===
First round
1	(Argentina) H Zeballos	6	6
(Colombia) A González	2	1
WC	(Mexico) José Enrique Hernández	2	2
(Colombia) E Struvay	6	6
(Ecuador) JC Campozano	2	4
(Colombia) R Farah	6	6
(Ecuador) I Endara	6	6
6	(Dominican Republic) V Estrella	1	4
4	(Argentina) F Bagnis	6	7^{7}
(Mexico) D Garza	2	6^{3}
(Austria) G Melzer	3	3
(United States) A El Mihdawy	6	6
(Mexico) S González	3	3
(United States) K Kim	6	6
Q	(Mexico) C Ramírez	4	1
5	(Argentina) E Schwank	6	6

Second round
1	(Argentina) H Zeballos	6^{7}	4
(Colombia) E Struvay	7^{9}	6
(Colombia) R Farah	6	6
(Ecuador) I Endara	2	2
4	(Argentina) F Bagnis	6	6
(United States) A El Mihdawy	4	2
(United States) K Kim	3	2
5	(Argentina) E Schwank	6	6

Quarterfinals
(Colombia) E Struvay
(Colombia) R Farah	w/o
4	(Argentina) F Bagnis	6^{1}	6	4
5	(Argentina) E Schwank	7^{7}	4	6

Semifinals
(Colombia) R Farah	6	6
5	(Argentina) E Schwank	1	3

=== Bottom half ===
First round
7	(Moldova) R Borvanov	6	6
Q	(Barbados) H Lewis	3	0
(Chile) G Rivera Aránguiz	7^{7}	4	7
Q	(Australia) Nima Roshan	6^{5}	6	5
(Italy) M Marrai	6	6
WC	(Mexico) Eduardo Magadan-Castro	1	4
WC	(Mexico) Carlos Velasco	1	0
3	(Colombia) C Salamanca	6	6
8	(Colombia) JS Cabal	6	7
(Italy) Claudio Grassi	2	5
WC	(Mexico) Marco Aurei Núñez	7^{7}	3	3
Q	(Mexico) M Sánchez	6^{4}	6	6
(United States) Greg Ouellette	2	6	3
(Romania) C Gârd	6	3	6
(Guatemala) C Díaz Figueroa	6	4	5
2	(Argentina) M González	2	6	7

Second round
7	(Moldova) R Borvanov	6	6
(Chile) G Rivera Aránguiz	3	4
(Italy) M Marrai	6	3	7
3	(Colombia) C Salamanca	1	6	5
8	(Colombia) JS Cabal	4	7	6
Q	(Mexico) M Sánchez	6	5	3
(Romania) C Gârd	0	3
2	(Argentina) M González	6	6

Quarterfinals
7	(Moldova) R Borvanov	6^{5}	7^{7}	4
(Italy) M Marrai	7^{7}	6^{5}	6
8	(Colombia) JS Cabal	6	4	7^{7}
2	(Argentina) M González	1	6	6^{5}

Semifinals
(Italy) M Marrai	6^{4}	7	6^{6}
8	(Colombia) JS Cabal	7^{7}	5	7^{8}
