= 2011 Aguascalientes Open – Doubles =

Doubles
- 2011 Aguascalientes Open

Final
- Champions: (Mexico) Daniel Garza (Mexico) Santiago González
- Runners-up: (Ecuador) Júlio César Campozano (Dominican Republic) Víctor Estrella
- Score: 6–4, 5–7, [11–9]

Events
Singles	Doubles
← 2010 ·	Aguascalientes Open	· 2012 →

Daniel Garza and Santiago González won the first edition of the tournament, defeating Júlio César Campozano and Víctor Estrella 6–4, 5–7, [11–9] in the final.

== Seeds ==
1. (Colombia) Juan Sebastián Cabal / (Colombia) Robert Farah (semifinals)
2. (Mexico) Daniel Garza / (Mexico) Santiago González (champions)
3. (Ecuador) Júlio César Campozano / (Dominican Republic) Víctor Estrella (final)
4. (Colombia) Carlos Salamanca / (Colombia) Eduardo Struvay (semifinals, withdrew)

== Draw ==
=== Key ===
- Q = Qualifier
- WC = Wild card
- LL = Lucky loser
- Alt = Alternate
- SE = Special exempt
- PR = Protected ranking
- ITF = ITF entry
- JE = Junior exempt
- w/o = Walkover
- r = Retired
- d = Defaulted
- SR = Special ranking

=== Draw ===
First round
1	(Colombia) JS Cabal (Colombia) R Farah	6	6^{2}	[10]
(Barbados) H Lewis (The Bahamas) M Rolle	4	7^{7}	[2]
(United States) A El Mihdawy (Australia) Nima Roshan	7^{7}	7
(Romania) C Gârd (United States) K Kim	6^{5}	5
3	(Ecuador) JC Campozano (Dominican Republic) V Estrella	6	6
(Moldova) R Borvanov (Guatemala) C Díaz Figueroa	4	2
(United States) Greg Ouellette (Mexico) M Sánchez	6	6
WC	(Mexico) José Enrique Hernández (Mexico) Gerardo Hernández	2	2
(Ecuador) I Endara (United States) Chris Kwon	2	2
(Mexico) Eduardo Magadan-Castro (Mexico) C Ramírez	6	6
WC	(Argentina) M González (Mexico) Marco Aurei Núñez	5	6	[7]
4	(Colombia) C Salamanca (Colombia) E Struvay	7	4	[10]
(Italy) Claudio Grassi (Italy) M Marrai	3	6	[10]
(Argentina) F Bagnis (Colombia) A González	6	3	[2]
WC	(Mexico) Jorge López (Chile) G Rivera Aránguiz	1	3
2	(Mexico) D Garza (Mexico) S González	6	6

Quarterfinals
1	(Colombia) JS Cabal (Colombia) R Farah	7	6
(United States) A El Mihdawy (Australia) N Roshan	5	2
3	(Ecuador) JC Campozano (Dominican Republic) V Estrella	6	6
(United States) G Ouellette (Mexico) M Sánchez	2	2
(Mexico) E Magadan-Castro (Mexico) C Ramírez	1	7^{7}	[7]
4	(Colombia) C Salamanca (Colombia) E Struvay	6	6^{5}	[10]
(Italy) Claudio Grassi (Italy) M Marrai	4	3
2	(Mexico) D Garza (Mexico) S González	6	6

Semifinals
1	(Colombia) JS Cabal (Colombia) R Farah	6^{5}	6	[4]
3	(Ecuador) JC Campozano (Dominican Republic) V Estrella	7^{7}	4	[10]
4	(Colombia) C Salamanca (Colombia) E Struvay
2	(Mexico) D Garza (Mexico) S González	w/o

Final
3	(Ecuador) JC Campozano (Dominican Republic) V Estrella	4	7	[9]
2	(Mexico) D Garza (Mexico) S González	6	5	[11]
