= 2008 Open Sabadell Atlántico Barcelona – Singles =

Singles
- 2008 Open Sabadell Atlántico Barcelona

Final
- Champion: (Spain) Rafael Nadal
- Runner-up: (Spain) David Ferrer
- Score: 6–1, 4–6, 6–1

Details
- Draw: 56 (4WC/7Q/2LL)
- Seeds: 17

Events
Singles	Doubles
← 2007 ·	Barcelona Open	· 2009 →

Three-time defending champion Rafael Nadal successfully defended his title, defeating David Ferrer in the final 6–1, 4–6, 6–1, to win the singles title at the 2008 Barcelona Open. It was his record fourth title at the Barcelona Open.

== Seeds ==
The top eight seeds receive a bye into the second round.

1. (Spain) Rafael Nadal (champion)
2. (Spain) David Ferrer (final)
3. (Argentina) David Nalbandian (third round)
4. (United States) James Blake (second round)
5. (Spain) Carlos Moyá (second round)
6. (Spain) Tommy Robredo (quarterfinals)
7. (United Kingdom) Andy Murray (second round)
8. (Croatia) Ivo Karlović (second round)
9. (Argentina) Guillermo Cañas (third round)
10. (Spain) Nicolás Almagro (quarterfinals)
11. (Spain) ~~Juan Carlos Ferrero~~ (withdrew)
12. (Finland) Jarkko Nieminen (first round)
13. (Spain) Fernando Verdasco (first round)
14. (Switzerland) Stanislas Wawrinka (semifinals)
15. (Russia) Dmitry Tursunov (third round)
16. (Spain) Feliciano López (third round)
17. (Argentina) Juan Ignacio Chela (quarterfinals)

== Draw ==
=== Key ===
- Q = Qualifier
- WC = Wild card
- LL = Lucky loser
- Alt = Alternate
- SE = Special exempt
- PR = Protected ranking
- ITF = ITF entry
- JE = Junior exempt
- w/o = Walkover
- r = Retired
- d = Defaulted
- SR = Special ranking

=== Finals ===
Quarterfinals
1	(Spain) Rafael Nadal	6	6
17	(Argentina) Juan Ignacio Chela	4	2
(Germany) Denis Gremelmayr	6	3	7
10	(Spain) Nicolás Almagro	2	6	6^{7}
(Spain) Albert Montañés	3	7	4
14	(Switzerland) Stanislas Wawrinka	6	6^{6}	6
6	(Spain) Tommy Robredo	6^{4}	4
2	(Spain) David Ferrer	7	6

Semifinals
1	(Spain) Rafael Nadal	6	6
(Germany) Denis Gremelmayr	1	0
14	(Switzerland) Stanislas Wawrinka	6^{8}	3
2	(Spain) David Ferrer	7	6

Final
1	(Spain) Rafael Nadal	6	4	6
2	(Spain) David Ferrer	1	6	1

=== Top half ===
==== Section 1 ====
First round
(Australia) P Luczak	6^{4}	1
(Italy) P Starace	7	6
Q	(Italy) M Marrai	3	3
WC	(Spain) A Martín	6	6
(Argentina) J Acasuso	2	r
16	(Spain) F López	5
17	(Argentina) JI Chela	6^{2}	6	6
(Spain) G García López	7	4	2
(Czech Republic) I Minář	1	r
Q	(Spain) M López	3
(Latvia) E Gulbis	6	4
(Serbia) J Tipsarević	4	2	r

Second round
1	(Spain) R Nadal	6	6
(Italy) P Starace	4	2
WC	(Spain) A Martín	6	2	4
16	(Spain) F López	3	6	6
17	(Argentina) JI Chela	5
Q	(Spain) M López	1	r
(Latvia) E Gulbis	4	6	6
5	(Spain) C Moyá	6	1	4

Third round
1	(Spain) R Nadal	6	6
16	(Spain) F López	4	3
17	(Argentina) JI Chela	2	6	6
(Latvia) E Gulbis	6	4	3

Quarterfinals
1	(Spain) R Nadal	6	6
17	(Argentina) JI Chela	4	2

==== Section 2 ====
First round
(Germany) D Gremelmayr	7	2
LL	(Spain) R Ramírez Hidalgo	6^{7}	1	r
(Brazil) M Daniel	6	6
(Spain) I Navarro	1	4
(South Africa) K Anderson	4	3
15	(Russia) D Tursunov	6	6
10	(Spain) N Almagro	6	0
(Serbia) V Troicki	2	0	r
(Austria) J Melzer	2	4
(Italy) F Volandri	6	6
WC	(Croatia) M Ančić	6	6
(Germany) M Zverev	1	0

Second round
4/WC	(United States) J Blake	1	4
(Germany) D Gremelmayr	6	6
(Brazil) M Daniel	4	3
15	(Russia) D Tursunov	6	6
10	(Spain) N Almagro	6	7
(Italy) F Volandri	4	6^{5}
WC	(Croatia) M Ančić	6	6
7/WC	(United Kingdom) A Murray	4	4

Third round
(Germany) D Gremelmayr	6	6
15	(Russia) D Tursunov	4	0
10	(Spain) N Almagro	7	6
WC	(Croatia) M Ančić	6^{5}	2

Quarterfinals
(Germany) D Gremelmayr	6	3	7
10	(Spain) N Almagro	2	6	6^{7}

=== Bottom half ===
==== Section 3 ====
First round
(Spain) M Granollers	6	3	2
(Spain) Montañés	3	6	6
(Argentina) JP Brzezicki	3	6^{3}
(Uruguay) P Cuevas	6	7
Q	(Russia) M Kukushkin	6	6
12	(Finland) J Nieminen	4	4
14	(Switzerland) S Wawrinka	6	6
Q	(Spain) JA Sánchez de Luna	3	3
LL	(Kazakhstan) Y Schukin	6	6
(United States) R Ginepri	4	2
(Argentina) A Calleri	6	6
(Sweden) T Johansson	1	3

Second round
8	(Croatia) I Karlović	7	3	5
(Spain) Montañés	6^{7}	6	7
(Uruguay) P Cuevas	0	4
Q	(Russia) M Kukushkin	6	6
14	(Switzerland) S Wawrinka	6	6
LL	(Kazakhstan) Y Schukin	3	4
(Argentina) A Calleri	6	6^{2}	3
3	(Argentina) D Nalbandian	1	7	6

Third round
(Spain) Montañés	6	3	6
Q	(Russia) M Kukushkin	3	6	3
14	(Switzerland) S Wawrinka	6	6
3	(Argentina) D Nalbandian	3	1

Quarterfinals
(Spain) Montañés	3	7	4
14	(Switzerland) S Wawrinka	6	6^{6}	6

==== Section 4 ====
First round
(Netherlands) R Haase	6	6
Q	(Belarus) M Mirnyi	2	2
(Russia) T Gabashvili	5	6	6
(Argentina) G Coria	7	4	4
(Spain) Ó Hernández	1	4
9	(Argentina) G Cañas	6	6
13	(Spain) F Verdasco	3	4
(Ecuador) N Lapentti	6	6
(Spain) S Ventura	2	1
Q	(Spain) D Gimeno Traver	6	6
(Austria) W Eschauer	4	6	2
Q	(Spain) G Trujillo Soler	6	4	6

Second round
6	(Spain) T Robredo	6	6
(Netherlands) R Haase	2	4
(Russia) T Gabashvili	1	2
9	(Argentina) G Cañas	6	6
(Ecuador) N Lapentti	6	6^{5}	7
Q	(Spain) D Gimeno Traver	3	7	5
Q	(Spain) G Trujillo Soler	1	1
2	(Spain) D Ferrer	6	6

Third round
6	(Spain) T Robredo	6	7
9	(Argentina) G Cañas	1	5
(Ecuador) N Lapentti	6	4	3
2	(Spain) D Ferrer	4	6	6

Quarterfinals
6	(Spain) T Robredo	6^{4}	4
2	(Spain) D Ferrer	7	6

== Qualifying ==
=== Qualifying seeds ===
1. (Spain) Daniel Gimeno Traver (qualified)
2. (Kazakhstan) Yuri Schukin (qualifying competition, lucky Loser)
3. (Spain) Rubén Ramírez Hidalgo (qualifying competition, lucky Loser)
4. (Russia) Andrey Golubev (qualifying competition)
5. (Belgium) Christophe Rochus (first round)
6. (Russia) Mikhail Kukushkin (qualified)
7. (Uzbekistan) Denis Istomin (qualifying competition)
8. (Russia) Mikhail Ledovskikh (first round)
9. (Austria) Oliver Marach (qualifying competition)
10. (Spain) Marc López (qualified)
11. (Spain) Gabriel Trujillo Soler (qualified)
12. (Spain) Pere Riba (qualifying competition)
13. (Belarus) Max Mirnyi (qualified)
14. (Spain) Miguel Ángel López Jaén (qualifying competition)

=== Qualifiers ===
1. (Spain) Daniel Gimeno Traver
2. (Spain) Marc López
3. (Belarus) Max Mirnyi
4. (Italy) Matteo Marrai
5. (Spain) José Antonio Sánchez de Luna
6. (Russia) Mikhail Kukushkin
7. (Spain) Gabriel Trujillo Soler

=== Lucky losers ===
1. (Kazakhstan) Yuri Schukin
2. (Spain) Rubén Ramírez Hidalgo

=== Qualifying draw ===
==== First qualifier ====
First round
1	(Spain) Daniel Gimeno Traver	6	6
WC	(Spain) Albert Ramos Viñolas	0	1
(Italy) Manuel Jorquera	3	4
12	(Spain) Pere Riba	6	6

Qualifying competition
1	(Spain) Daniel Gimeno Traver	7^{9}	7^{7}
12	(Spain) Pere Riba	6^{7}	6^{3}

==== Second qualifier ====
First round
2	(Kazakhstan) Yuri Schukin	7	6
(Italy) Enrico Burzi	5	4
WC	(Spain) Steven Diez	4	1
10	(Spain) Marc López	6	6

Qualifying competition
2	(Kazakhstan) Yuri Schukin	6^{4}	6	3
10	(Spain) Marc López	7^{7}	4	6

==== Third qualifier ====
First round
3	(Spain) Rubén Ramírez Hidalgo	4	6	7^{7}
(Spain) Guillermo Alcaide	6	0	6^{3}
WC	(Spain) Gerard Granollers	5	6	3
13	(Belarus) Max Mirnyi	7	4	6

Qualifying competition
3	(Spain) Rubén Ramírez Hidalgo	4	1
13	(Belarus) Max Mirnyi	6	6

==== Fourth qualifier ====
First round
4	(Russia) Andrey Golubev	6	6
Alt	(Bulgaria) Grigor Dimitrov	4	0
(Italy) Matteo Marrai	2	7^{7}	6
8	(Russia) Mikhail Ledovskikh	6	6^{4}	4

Qualifying competition
4	(Russia) Andrey Golubev	4	7^{7}	1
(Italy) Matteo Marrai	6	6^{4}	6

==== Fifth qualifier ====
First round
5	(Belgium) Christophe Rochus	4	6	1
(Spain) José Antonio Sánchez de Luna	6	3	6
(Spain) Héctor Ruiz-Cadenas	3	4
14	(Spain) Miguel Ángel López Jaén	6	6

Qualifying competition
(Spain) José Antonio Sánchez de Luna	7^{7}	6
14	(Spain) Miguel Ángel López Jaén	6^{2}	1

==== Sixth qualifier ====
First round
6	(Russia) Mikhail Kukushkin	7	6
Alt	(Spain) Guillermo Olaso	5	1
(Italy) Andrea Stoppini	5	1
9	(Austria) Oliver Marach	7	6

Qualifying competition
6	(Russia) Mikhail Kukushkin	4	6	7
9	(Austria) Oliver Marach	6	4	5

==== Seventh qualifier ====
First round
7	(Uzbekistan) Denis Istomin	1	6	6
(Spain) Carles Poch Gradin	6	2	3
WC	(Spain) Guillermo Alcorta Olarra	1	4
11	(Spain) Gabriel Trujillo Soler	6	6

Qualifying competition
7	(Uzbekistan) Denis Istomin	5	5
11	(Spain) Gabriel Trujillo Soler	7	7
