= 2014 ITF Men's Circuit (January–March) =

Annual tournament

This article includes the 2014 ITF Men's Circuit tournaments which occurred between January and March 2014.

== Point distribution ==
Tournament Category	W	F	SF	QF	R16	R32
Futures 15,000+H	35	20	10	4	1	0
Futures 15,000	27	15	8	3	1	0
Futures 10,000+H	27	15	8	3	1	0
Futures 10,000	18	10	6	2	1	0

== Key ==
$15,000 tournaments
$10,000 tournaments

== Month ==
=== January ===
Week of	Tournament	Winner	Runners-up	Semifinalists	Quarterfinalists
January 6	Germany F1 Futures; Schwieberdingen, Germany; Carpet (indoor) $10,000; Singles and Doubles Draw	(France) Fabrice Martin; 4–6, 7–5, 6–3	(Germany) Bastian Knittel	(Switzerland) Yann Marti (Germany) Andreas Mies	(Monaco) Romain Arneodo (Germany) Nils Langer (France) Hugo Nys (Switzerland) Michael Lammer
January 6	Germany F1 Futures; Schwieberdingen, Germany; Carpet (indoor) $10,000; Singles and Doubles Draw	(Sweden) Jacob Adaktusson (Bulgaria) Dimitar Kutrovsky; 6–3, 1–6, [10–6]	(Poland) Błażej Koniusz (Poland) Mateusz Kowalczyk	(Switzerland) Yann Marti (Germany) Andreas Mies	(Monaco) Romain Arneodo (Germany) Nils Langer (France) Hugo Nys (Switzerland) Michael Lammer
January 6	USA F1 Futures; Plantation, United States; Clay $10,000; Singles and Doubles Draw	(United States) Sekou Bangoura; 6–4, 6–2	(Japan) Yoshihito Nishioka	(Romania) Victor Crivoi (Ecuador) Gonzalo Escobar	(United States) Dennis Nevolo (Croatia) Franko Škugor (Czech Republic) Adam Pavlásek (France) Gianni Mina
January 6	USA F1 Futures; Plantation, United States; Clay $10,000; Singles and Doubles Draw	(United States) Kevin King (Colombia) Juan Carlos Spir; 7–6^{(7–5)}, 6–3	(United States) Jean-Yves Aubone (United States) Vahid Mirzadeh	(Romania) Victor Crivoi (Ecuador) Gonzalo Escobar	(United States) Dennis Nevolo (Croatia) Franko Škugor (Czech Republic) Adam Pavlásek (France) Gianni Mina
January 13	Egypt F1 Futures; Sharm El Sheikh, Egypt; Clay $10,000	(France) Tak Khunn Wang; 6–1, 6–2	(Italy) Gianluca Naso	(Serbia) Nikola Ćaćić (Venezuela) Ricardo Rodríguez	(South Korea) Seo Yong-bum (Austria) Marc Rath (Italy) Alberto Brizzi (Poland) Rafał Teurer
January 13	Egypt F1 Futures; Sharm El Sheikh, Egypt; Clay $10,000	(Brazil) José Pereira (France) Tak Khunn Wang; 6–3, 1–6, [10–1]	(Italy) Alberto Brizzi (Italy) Gianluca Naso	(Serbia) Nikola Ćaćić (Venezuela) Ricardo Rodríguez	(South Korea) Seo Yong-bum (Austria) Marc Rath (Italy) Alberto Brizzi (Poland) Rafał Teurer
January 13	France F1 Futures; Bagnoles-de-l'Orne, France; Clay (indoor) $10,000+H	(France) Jonathan Eysseric; 6–0, 6–3	(France) Antoine Benneteau	(France) Florent Serra (Belgium) Yannick Mertens	(France) Maxime Janvier (Germany) Richard Becker (France) Medy Chettar (Poland) Błażej Koniusz
January 13	France F1 Futures; Bagnoles-de-l'Orne, France; Clay (indoor) $10,000+H	(Poland) Błażej Koniusz (Poland) Mateusz Kowalczyk; 6–2, 6–3	(France) Dorian Descloix (France) Gleb Sakharov	(France) Florent Serra (Belgium) Yannick Mertens	(France) Maxime Janvier (Germany) Richard Becker (France) Medy Chettar (Poland) Błażej Koniusz
January 13	Germany F2 Futures; Stuttgart-Stammheim, Germany; Hard (indoor) $10,000	(Belarus) Uladzimir Ignatik; 4–6, 6–3 7–6^{(7–3)}	(Slovakia) Karol Beck	(France) Fabrice Martin (Germany) Nils Langer	(Serbia) Dejan Katić (Russia) Alexey Vatutin (Kazakhstan) Evgeny Korolev (Germany) Peter Torebko
January 13	Germany F2 Futures; Stuttgart-Stammheim, Germany; Hard (indoor) $10,000	(Germany) Kevin Krawietz (Germany) Hannes Wagner; 6–4, 3–6, [10–7]	(Russia) Karen Khachanov (Russia) Denis Matsukevich	(France) Fabrice Martin (Germany) Nils Langer	(Serbia) Dejan Katić (Russia) Alexey Vatutin (Kazakhstan) Evgeny Korolev (Germany) Peter Torebko
January 13	Great Britain F1 Futures; Glasgow, United Kingdom; Hard (indoor) $10,000	(Lithuania) Laurynas Grigelis; 7–5, 6–7^{(4–7)}, 7–5	(United Kingdom) Daniel Smethurst	(United Kingdom) Edward Corrie (Estonia) Vladimir Ivanov	(Italy) Riccardo Bellotti (United Kingdom) Ashley Hewitt (United Kingdom) George Coupland (Belgium) Maxime Authom
January 13	Great Britain F1 Futures; Glasgow, United Kingdom; Hard (indoor) $10,000	(United Kingdom) David Rice (United Kingdom) Sean Thornley; 6–3, 6–1	(United Kingdom) Edward Corrie (United Kingdom) Daniel Smethurst	(United Kingdom) Edward Corrie (Estonia) Vladimir Ivanov	(Italy) Riccardo Bellotti (United Kingdom) Ashley Hewitt (United Kingdom) George Coupland (Belgium) Maxime Authom
January 13	Israel F1 Futures; Eilat, Israel; Hard $10,000	(France) Martin Vaïsse; 7–6^{(7–3)}, 6–3	(Italy) Luca Vanni	(Ukraine) Vadim Alekseenko (Croatia) Mate Delić	(United Kingdom) Marcus Willis (Russia) Aleksandr Vasilenko (Sweden) Elias Ymer (Chinese Taipei) Huang Liang-chi
January 13	Israel F1 Futures; Eilat, Israel; Hard $10,000	(United Kingdom) Lewis Burton (United Kingdom) Marcus Willis; 6–3, 6–2	(Uzbekistan) Shonigmatjon Shofayziyev (Russia) Anton Zaitcev	(Ukraine) Vadim Alekseenko (Croatia) Mate Delić	(United Kingdom) Marcus Willis (Russia) Aleksandr Vasilenko (Sweden) Elias Ymer (Chinese Taipei) Huang Liang-chi
January 13	USA F2 Futures; Sunrise, United States; Clay $10,000	(United Kingdom) Kyle Edmund; 6–0, 6–3	(Japan) Yoshihito Nishioka	(United States) Noah Rubin (Barbados) Darian King	(Czech Republic) Adam Pavlásek (France) Gianni Mina (South Africa) Fritz Wolmarans (United States) Dennis Nevolo
January 13	USA F2 Futures; Sunrise, United States; Clay $10,000	(United States) Jason Jung (United States) Evan King; 6–7^{(4–7)}, 6–4, [10–6]	(United States) William Blumberg (United States) Frances Tiafoe	(United States) Noah Rubin (Barbados) Darian King	(Czech Republic) Adam Pavlásek (France) Gianni Mina (South Africa) Fritz Wolmarans (United States) Dennis Nevolo
January 20	Germany F3 Futures; Kaarst, Germany; Carpet (indoor) $15,000	(Georgia (country)) Nikoloz Basilashvili; 2–6, 7–5, 6–3	(Slovakia) Miloslav Mečíř	(Bulgaria) Dimitar Kutrovsky (Belarus) Uladzimir Ignatik	(Czech Republic) Marek Michalička (Belarus) Aliaksandr Bury (North Macedonia) Dimitar Grabul (Serbia) Dejan Katić
January 20	Germany F3 Futures; Kaarst, Germany; Carpet (indoor) $15,000	(Georgia (country)) Nikoloz Basilashvili (Belarus) Aliaksandr Bury; 4–6, 6–4, [10–6]	(Belarus) Uladzimir Ignatik (Bulgaria) Dimitar Kutrovsky	(Bulgaria) Dimitar Kutrovsky (Belarus) Uladzimir Ignatik	(Czech Republic) Marek Michalička (Belarus) Aliaksandr Bury (North Macedonia) Dimitar Grabul (Serbia) Dejan Katić
January 20	Egypt F2 Futures; Sharm El Sheikh, Egypt; Clay $10,000	(Italy) Alberto Brizzi; 6–7^{(5–7)}, 6–3, 7–5	(Italy) Gianluca Naso	(Brazil) José Pereira (France) Tak Khunn Wang	(Spain) Jordi Samper Montaña (Austria) Bastian Trinker (Italy) Stefano Travaglia (Venezuela) Ricardo Rodríguez
January 20	Egypt F2 Futures; Sharm El Sheikh, Egypt; Clay $10,000	(Brazil) José Pereira (France) Tak Khunn Wang; 1–6, 6–3, [10–8]	(Italy) Lorenzo Frigerio (Italy) Stefano Travaglia	(Brazil) José Pereira (France) Tak Khunn Wang	(Spain) Jordi Samper Montaña (Austria) Bastian Trinker (Italy) Stefano Travaglia (Venezuela) Ricardo Rodríguez
January 20	France F2 Futures; Bressuire, France; Hard (indoor) $10,000+H	(France) Josselin Ouanna; 7–6^{(7–4)}, 1–6, 6–4	(France) Grégoire Burquier	(France) Gleb Sakharov (Belgium) Maxime Authom	(Latvia) Andis Juška (France) Hugo Nys (France) Fabrice Martin (France) Sadio Doumbia
January 20	France F2 Futures; Bressuire, France; Hard (indoor) $10,000+H	(France) Rémi Boutillier (Madagascar) Antso Rakotondramanga walkover	(France) Sébastien Boltz (France) Grégoire Jacq	(France) Gleb Sakharov (Belgium) Maxime Authom	(Latvia) Andis Juška (France) Hugo Nys (France) Fabrice Martin (France) Sadio Doumbia
January 20	Great Britain F2 Futures; Sunderland, United Kingdom; Hard (indoor) $10,000	(United Kingdom) Daniel Smethurst; 6–3, 7–5	(United Kingdom) David Rice	(United Kingdom) Daniel Cox (Belgium) Yannick Mertens	(Italy) Riccardo Bellotti (Finland) Micke Kontinen (Belgium) Julien Cagnina (Netherlands) Sander Arends
January 20	Great Britain F2 Futures; Sunderland, United Kingdom; Hard (indoor) $10,000	(United Kingdom) David Rice (United Kingdom) Sean Thornley; 6–3, 6–3	(United Kingdom) Richard Gabb (United Kingdom) Joshua Ward-Hibbert	(United Kingdom) Daniel Cox (Belgium) Yannick Mertens	(Italy) Riccardo Bellotti (Finland) Micke Kontinen (Belgium) Julien Cagnina (Netherlands) Sander Arends
January 20	Israel F2 Futures; Eilat, Israel; Hard $10,000	(Israel) Amir Weintraub; 6–0, 6–1	(France) Martin Vaïsse	(Croatia) Mate Delić (Italy) Claudio Fortuna	(Italy) Federico Gaio (Ukraine) Vadim Alekseenko (Moldova) Maxim Dubarenco (Russia) Anton Zaitcev
January 20	Israel F2 Futures; Eilat, Israel; Hard $10,000	(Chinese Taipei) Huang Liang-chi (Israel) Amir Weintraub; 6–3, 7–6 ^{(9–7)}	(United Kingdom) Lewis Burton (United Kingdom) Marcus Willis	(Croatia) Mate Delić (Italy) Claudio Fortuna	(Italy) Federico Gaio (Ukraine) Vadim Alekseenko (Moldova) Maxim Dubarenco (Russia) Anton Zaitcev
January 20	USA F3 Futures; Weston, United States; Clay $10,000	(Romania) Victor Crivoi; 6–7^{(2–7)}, 7–5, 6–0	(United Kingdom) Kyle Edmund	(Belgium) Arthur De Greef (Sweden) Isak Arvidsson	(Czech Republic) Adam Pavlásek (United States) Eric Quigley (South Africa) Fritz Wolmarans (Brazil) Thales Turini
January 20	USA F3 Futures; Weston, United States; Clay $10,000	(Sweden) Markus Eriksson (Sweden) Milos Sekulic; 6–7 ^{(5–7)}, 7–6^{7–4}, [17–15]	(United States) Jason Jung (United States) Evan King	(Belgium) Arthur De Greef (Sweden) Isak Arvidsson	(Czech Republic) Adam Pavlásek (United States) Eric Quigley (South Africa) Fritz Wolmarans (Brazil) Thales Turini
January 27	Germany F4 Futures; Nussloch, Germany; Carpet (indoor) $15,000	(Netherlands) Thomas Schoorel; 6–4, 6–7^{(5–7)}, 6–4	(Czech Republic) Jan Mertl	(Germany) Andreas Beck (Czech Republic) Marek Michalička	(Germany) Tim Pütz (Germany) Sebastian Prechtel (Germany) Nils Langer (Germany) Robin Kern
January 27	Germany F4 Futures; Nussloch, Germany; Carpet (indoor) $15,000	(Czech Republic) Roman Jebavý (Czech Republic) Marek Michalička; 7–6^{(8–6)}, 7–5	(Netherlands) Romano Frantzen (Netherlands) Thomas Schoorel	(Germany) Andreas Beck (Czech Republic) Marek Michalička	(Germany) Tim Pütz (Germany) Sebastian Prechtel (Germany) Nils Langer (Germany) Robin Kern
January 27	Argentina F1 Futures; Carlos Paz, Argentina; Clay $10,000	(Argentina) Andrea Collarini; 3–6, 6–0, 6–2	(Chile) Nicolás Jarry	(Argentina) Gabriel Alejandro Hidalgo (Argentina) Andrés Molteni	(Argentina) Patricio Heras (Argentina) Facundo Mena (Argentina) Pedro Cachin (Argentina) Federico Coria
January 27	Argentina F1 Futures; Carlos Paz, Argentina; Clay $10,000	(Argentina) Tomás Lipovšek Puches (Argentina) Eduardo Agustín Torre; 6–4, 6–4	(Chile) Simon Navarro (Chile) Cristóbal Saavedra Corvalán	(Argentina) Gabriel Alejandro Hidalgo (Argentina) Andrés Molteni	(Argentina) Patricio Heras (Argentina) Facundo Mena (Argentina) Pedro Cachin (Argentina) Federico Coria
January 27	Egypt F3 Futures; Sharm El Sheikh, Egypt; Clay $10,000	(Italy) Stefano Travaglia; 6–0, 6–0	(Australia) Jason Kubler	(Russia) Ivan Nedelko (Brazil) José Pereira	(Spain) Roberto Carballés Baena (Austria) Bastian Trinker (Russia) Ronald Slobodchikov (Serbia) Ilija Vučić
January 27	Egypt F3 Futures; Sharm El Sheikh, Egypt; Clay $10,000	(Brazil) José Pereira (Italy) Stefano Travaglia; 2–6, 6-3, [10–8]	(Serbia) Miljan Zekić (Serbia) Arsenije Zlatanović	(Russia) Ivan Nedelko (Brazil) José Pereira	(Spain) Roberto Carballés Baena (Austria) Bastian Trinker (Russia) Ronald Slobodchikov (Serbia) Ilija Vučić
January 27	France F3 Futures; Feucherolles, France; Hard (indoor) $10,000+H	(Belgium) Maxime Authom; 7–6^{(7–5)}, 7–5	(France) Josselin Ouanna	(France) Mathieu Rodrigues (France) Jonathan Eysseric	(France) Fabien Reboul (France) Grégoire Barrère (Italy) Roberto Marcora (France) Sébastien Boltz
January 27	France F3 Futures; Feucherolles, France; Hard (indoor) $10,000+H	(France) Jonathan Eysseric (France) Nicolas Renavand; 7–6 ^{(7–5)}, 6–4	(France) Tristan Lamasine (France) Laurent Lokoli	(France) Mathieu Rodrigues (France) Jonathan Eysseric	(France) Fabien Reboul (France) Grégoire Barrère (Italy) Roberto Marcora (France) Sébastien Boltz
January 27	Great Britain F3 Futures; Sheffield, United Kingdom; Hard (indoor) $10,000	(United Kingdom) David Rice; 5–7, 6–3, 6–4	(United Kingdom) Daniel Smethurst	(United Kingdom) Edward Corrie (Netherlands) Antal van der Duim	(United Kingdom) Daniel Cox (France) Rémi Boutillier (France) Constant Lestienne (United Kingdom) Harry Meehan
January 27	Great Britain F3 Futures; Sheffield, United Kingdom; Hard (indoor) $10,000	(United Kingdom) Edward Corrie (United Kingdom) Daniel Smethurst; 3–6, 6–2, [10–8]	(United Kingdom) David Rice (United Kingdom) Sean Thornley	(United Kingdom) Edward Corrie (Netherlands) Antal van der Duim	(United Kingdom) Daniel Cox (France) Rémi Boutillier (France) Constant Lestienne (United Kingdom) Harry Meehan
January 27	Israel F3 Futures; Eilat, Israel; Hard $10,000	(Israel) Amir Weintraub; 6–4, 6–2	(Croatia) Mate Delić	(France) Martin Vaïsse (Croatia) Matija Pecotić	(Italy) Federico Gaio (Italy) Claudio Fortuna (United Kingdom) Marcus Willis (Slovakia) Jozef Kovalík
January 27	Israel F3 Futures; Eilat, Israel; Hard $10,000	(United Kingdom) Lewis Burton (United Kingdom) Marcus Willis; 6–3, 7–5	(Italy) Claudio Grassi (Israel) Amir Weintraub	(France) Martin Vaïsse (Croatia) Matija Pecotić	(Italy) Federico Gaio (Italy) Claudio Fortuna (United Kingdom) Marcus Willis (Slovakia) Jozef Kovalík
January 27	Turkey F1 Futures; Antalya, Turkey; Hard $10,000	(Switzerland) Yann Marti; 6–2, 6–3	(Spain) Carlos Boluda Purkiss	(Serbia) Ivan Bjelica (Japan) Yusuke Watanuki	(Ukraine) Marat Deviatiarov (Italy) Marco Bortolotti (France) Jérôme Inzerillo (France) Maxime Tchoutakian
January 27	Turkey F1 Futures; Antalya, Turkey; Hard $10,000	(Spain) Carlos Boluda Purkiss (Spain) Roberto Ortega Olmedo; 6–1, 6–2	(Israel) Dekel Bar (Serbia) Marko Tepavac	(Serbia) Ivan Bjelica (Japan) Yusuke Watanuki	(Ukraine) Marat Deviatiarov (Italy) Marco Bortolotti (France) Jérôme Inzerillo (France) Maxime Tchoutakian
January 27	USA F4 Futures; Palm Coast, United States; Clay $10,000	(France) Gianni Mina; 6–2, 6–0	(Sweden) Isak Arvidsson	(Brazil) Pedro Sakamoto (Belgium) Arthur De Greef	(United States) Gregory Ouellette (United States) Frances Tiafoe (Czech Republic) Ivo Minář (United States) Eric Quigley
January 27	USA F4 Futures; Palm Coast, United States; Clay $10,000	(Sweden) Markus Eriksson (Sweden) Milos Sekulic; 6–1, 6–1	(United States) Taylor Fritz (United States) Martin Redlicki	(Brazil) Pedro Sakamoto (Belgium) Arthur De Greef	(United States) Gregory Ouellette (United States) Frances Tiafoe (Czech Republic) Ivo Minář (United States) Eric Quigley

=== February ===
Week of	Tournament	Winner	Runners-up	Semifinalists	Quarterfinalists
February 3	Argentina F2 Futures; Arroyito, Argentina; Clay $10,000	(Argentina) Patricio Heras; 6–2, 7–6 ^{(7–3)}	(Germany) Bastian Knittel	(Argentina) Federico Coria (Brazil) Bruno Sant'Anna	(Japan) Ryūsei Makiguchi (Argentina) Pablo Galdón (Argentina) Pedro Cachin (Brazil) André Miele
February 3	Argentina F2 Futures; Arroyito, Argentina; Clay $10,000	Cancelled due to rain		(Argentina) Federico Coria (Brazil) Bruno Sant'Anna	(Japan) Ryūsei Makiguchi (Argentina) Pablo Galdón (Argentina) Pedro Cachin (Brazil) André Miele
February 3	Egypt F4 Futures; Sharm El Sheikh, Egypt; Clay $10,000	(Italy) Stefano Travaglia; 6–2, 6–4	(Brazil) José Pereira	(Italy) Gianluca Naso (Italy) Enrico Burzi	(Serbia) Arsenije Zlatanović (Russia) Ivan Nedelko (Russia) Ronald Slobodchikov (Portugal) Vasco Mensurado
February 3	Egypt F4 Futures; Sharm El Sheikh, Egypt; Clay $10,000	(Switzerland) Jessy Kalambay (Syria) Issam Al Tawil; 3–6, 6–0, [10–6]	(Italy) Enrico Burzi (Italy) Filippo Leonardi	(Italy) Gianluca Naso (Italy) Enrico Burzi	(Serbia) Arsenije Zlatanović (Russia) Ivan Nedelko (Russia) Ronald Slobodchikov (Portugal) Vasco Mensurado
February 3	Great Britain F4 Futures; Wirral, United Kingdom; Hard (indoor) $10,000	(United Kingdom) Tom Fraquharson; 6–3, 7–5	(United Kingdom) Daniel Smethurst	(United Kingdom) Luke Bambridge (United Kingdom) George Coupland	(United Kingdom) Edward Corrie (France) Nicolas Rosenzweig (United Kingdom) George Morgan (United Kingdom) David Rice
February 3	Great Britain F4 Futures; Wirral, United Kingdom; Hard (indoor) $10,000	(United Kingdom) Edward Corrie (United Kingdom) Daniel Smethurst; 5–7, 7–6^{(8–6)}, [10–6]	(United Kingdom) Luke Bambridge (United Kingdom) Ross Hutchins	(United Kingdom) Luke Bambridge (United Kingdom) George Coupland	(United Kingdom) Edward Corrie (France) Nicolas Rosenzweig (United Kingdom) George Morgan (United Kingdom) David Rice
February 3	Portugal F1 Futures; Vale do Lobo, Portugal; Hard $10,000	(United Kingdom) Oliver Golding; 6–1, 6–3	(Russia) Stanislav Vovk	(Portugal) João Domingues (Spain) Iván Arenas Gualda	(Belgium) Yannik Reuter (Spain) Javier Pulgar García (Spain) David Pérez Sanz (Spain) Carlos Gómez Herrera
February 3	Portugal F1 Futures; Vale do Lobo, Portugal; Hard $10,000	(Spain) Iván Arenas Gualda (Spain) David Pérez Sanz; 2–6, 7–6^{(7–3)}, [11–9]	(Spain) Juan Samuel Arauzo Martínez (Spain) Jaime Pulgar García	(Portugal) João Domingues (Spain) Iván Arenas Gualda	(Belgium) Yannik Reuter (Spain) Javier Pulgar García (Spain) David Pérez Sanz (Spain) Carlos Gómez Herrera
February 3	Spain F1 Futures; Peguera, Spain; Clay $10,000	(Australia) Jason Kubler; 6–4, 6–4	(Germany) Peter Heller	(Spain) Marc Giner (Spain) Roberto Carballés Baena	(Spain) Marcos Giraldi Requena (Spain) Pol Toledo Bagué (Spain) Eduard Esteve Lobato (Russia) Ivan Gakhov
February 3	Spain F1 Futures; Peguera, Spain; Clay $10,000	(Spain) Pedro Martínez (Spain) Jaume Munar; 6–1, 6–1	(Spain) Roberto Carballés Baena (Spain) Oriol Roca Batalla	(Spain) Marc Giner (Spain) Roberto Carballés Baena	(Spain) Marcos Giraldi Requena (Spain) Pol Toledo Bagué (Spain) Eduard Esteve Lobato (Russia) Ivan Gakhov
February 3	Turkey F2 Futures; Antalya, Turkey; Hard $10,000	(Ukraine) Artem Smirnov; 6–4, 7–6^{(7–5)}	(Italy) Pietro Licciardi	(Russia) Aleksandr Lobkov (Romania) Teodor-Dacian Crăciun	(Bosnia and Herzegovina) Aldin Šetkić (Italy) Marco Bortolotti (Germany) Steven Moneke (Spain) Carlos Boluda Purkiss
February 3	Turkey F2 Futures; Antalya, Turkey; Hard $10,000	(Turkey) Cem İlkel (Turkey) Anıl Yüksel; 6–0, 7–6^{(7–3)}	(Spain) Carlos Boluda Purkiss (Spain) Roberto Ortega Olmedo	(Russia) Aleksandr Lobkov (Romania) Teodor-Dacian Crăciun	(Bosnia and Herzegovina) Aldin Šetkić (Italy) Marco Bortolotti (Germany) Steven Moneke (Spain) Carlos Boluda Purkiss
February 10	Croatia F1 Futures; Zagreb, Croatia; Hard (indoor) $15,000	(United Kingdom) Kyle Edmund; 6–2, 7–5	(Croatia) Filip Veger	(Belarus) Uladzimir Ignatik (Germany) Peter Torebko	(Croatia) Dino Marcan (Moldova) Maxim Dubarenco (Bulgaria) Tihomir Grozdanov (Croatia) Borna Ćorić
February 10	Croatia F1 Futures; Zagreb, Croatia; Hard (indoor) $15,000	(Bosnia and Herzegovina) Tomislav Brkić (Slovenia) Janez Semrajc; 7–6^{(7–3)}, 7–6^{(9–7)}	(Croatia) Dino Marcan (Croatia) Antonio Šančić	(Belarus) Uladzimir Ignatik (Germany) Peter Torebko	(Croatia) Dino Marcan (Moldova) Maxim Dubarenco (Bulgaria) Tihomir Grozdanov (Croatia) Borna Ćorić
February 10	Argentina F3 Futures; Villa Allende, Argentina; Clay $10,000	(Argentina) Gabriel Alejandro Hidalgo; 6–1, 6–7^{(1–7)}, 6–1	(Argentina) Pedro Cachin	(Colombia) Juan Chavarriaga (Argentina) Valentin Florez	(Argentina) Pablo Galdón (Argentina) Joaquín Jesús Monteferrario (Uruguay) Martín Cuevas (Brazil) Bruno Sant'Anna
February 10	Argentina F3 Futures; Villa Allende, Argentina; Clay $10,000	(Brazil) Tiago Fernandes (Brazil) Bruno Sant'Anna; 7–5, 6–1	(Argentina) Valentin Florez (Argentina) Patricio Heras	(Colombia) Juan Chavarriaga (Argentina) Valentin Florez	(Argentina) Pablo Galdón (Argentina) Joaquín Jesús Monteferrario (Uruguay) Martín Cuevas (Brazil) Bruno Sant'Anna
February 10	Egypt F5 Futures; Sharm El Sheikh, Egypt; Clay $10,000	(Austria) Dennis Novak; 7–6^{(7–5)} 6–1	(Italy) Matteo Marrai	(Finland) Henrik Sillanpää (Italy) Alberto Brizzi	(Germany) Kevin Kaczynski (Greece) Alexandros Jakupovic (Austria) Bastian Trinker (Germany) Daniel Uhlig
February 10	Egypt F5 Futures; Sharm El Sheikh, Egypt; Clay $10,000	(Czech Republic) Lukáš Maršoun (Czech Republic) Libor Salaba; 7–6^{(7–4)}, 4–6, [12–10]	(Italy) Filippo Leonardi (Colombia) Cristian Rodríguez	(Finland) Henrik Sillanpää (Italy) Alberto Brizzi	(Germany) Kevin Kaczynski (Greece) Alexandros Jakupovic (Austria) Bastian Trinker (Germany) Daniel Uhlig
February 10	Guatemala F1 Futures; Guatemala City, Guatemala; Hard $10,000	(Spain) Enrique López Pérez; 6–3, 0–6, 6–4	(Guatemala) Christopher Díaz Figueroa	(Venezuela) Jesús Bandrés (Ecuador) Emilio Gómez	(Brazil) Fabiano de Paula (Colombia) Michael Quintero (Peru) Rodrigo Sánchez (El Salvador) Marcelo Arévalo
February 10	Guatemala F1 Futures; Guatemala City, Guatemala; Hard $10,000	(El Salvador) Marcelo Arévalo (Guatemala) Christopher Díaz Figueroa; 6–3, 7–6^{(7–5)}	(Ecuador) Emilio Gómez (Venezuela) Luis David Martínez	(Venezuela) Jesús Bandrés (Ecuador) Emilio Gómez	(Brazil) Fabiano de Paula (Colombia) Michael Quintero (Peru) Rodrigo Sánchez (El Salvador) Marcelo Arévalo
February 10	Italy F1 Futures; Sondrio, Italy; Hard (indoor) $10,000	(Italy) Luca Vanni; 6–2, 7–5	(Germany) Moritz Baumann	(France) Rémi Boutillier (Serbia) Nikola Ćaćić	(Italy) Pietro Rondoni (Serbia) Denis Bejtulahi (Germany) Florian Fallert (Czech Republic) Roman Jebavý
February 10	Italy F1 Futures; Sondrio, Italy; Hard (indoor) $10,000	(Czech Republic) Roman Jebavý (Czech Republic) Robin Staněk; 3–6, 7–5, [10–7]	(Serbia) Nikola Ćaćić (Serbia) Ilija Vučić	(France) Rémi Boutillier (Serbia) Nikola Ćaćić	(Italy) Pietro Rondoni (Serbia) Denis Bejtulahi (Germany) Florian Fallert (Czech Republic) Roman Jebavý
February 10	Portugal F2 Futures; Loulé, Portugal; Hard $10,000	(Russia) Stanislav Vovk; 7–6^{(7–3)}, 7–6^{(7–2)}	(Spain) Juan Samuel Arauzo Martínez	(United Kingdom) Oliver Golding (Spain) Javier Pulgar García	(Belgium) Yannik Reuter (Netherlands) Miliaan Niesten (Spain) David Pérez Sanz (Belgium) Julien Cagnina
February 10	Portugal F2 Futures; Loulé, Portugal; Hard $10,000	Cancelled due to rain		(United Kingdom) Oliver Golding (Spain) Javier Pulgar García	(Belgium) Yannik Reuter (Netherlands) Miliaan Niesten (Spain) David Pérez Sanz (Belgium) Julien Cagnina
February 10	Spain F2 Futures; Peguera, Spain; Clay $10,000	(Spain) Oriol Roca Batalla; 2–6, 6–3, 6–3	(Australia) Jason Kubler	(Sweden) Markus Eriksson (Spain) Marc Giner	(France) Laurent Lokoli (France) Johan Tatlot (Sweden) Milos Sekulic (Spain) Eduard Esteve Lobato
February 10	Spain F2 Futures; Peguera, Spain; Clay $10,000	(Australia) Jason Kubler (Spain) Pol Toledo Bagué; 6–1, 6–3	(Spain) Oriol Roca Batalla (Germany) Jean-Marc Werner	(Sweden) Markus Eriksson (Spain) Marc Giner	(France) Laurent Lokoli (France) Johan Tatlot (Sweden) Milos Sekulic (Spain) Eduard Esteve Lobato
February 10	Thailand F1 Futures; Nonthaburi, Thailand; Hard $10,000	(South Korea) Chung Hyeon; 6–2, 7–6^{(7–4)}	(South Korea) Nam Ji-sung	(China) Gong Maoxin (France) Grégoire Barrère	(Japan) Hiroki Kondo (United Kingdom) Marcus Willis (Japan) Yuichi Ito (Japan) Arata Onozawa
February 10	Thailand F1 Futures; Nonthaburi, Thailand; Hard $10,000	(Japan) Yuichi Ito (Japan) Hiroki Kondo; 6–4, 6–7^{(4–7)}, [10–7]	(United Kingdom) Lewis Burton (United Kingdom) Marcus Willis	(China) Gong Maoxin (France) Grégoire Barrère	(Japan) Hiroki Kondo (United Kingdom) Marcus Willis (Japan) Yuichi Ito (Japan) Arata Onozawa
February 10	Turkey F3 Futures; Antalya, Turkey; Hard $10,000	(Ukraine) Artem Smirnov; 7–6^{(7–4)}, 1–6, 6–4	(Slovakia) Jozef Kovalík	(South Africa) Tucker Vorster (Ukraine) Aleksandr Lobkov	(Turkey) Barış Ergüden (Japan) Hiroyasu Ehara (United Kingdom) Richard Gabb (Serbia) Nikola Milojević
February 10	Turkey F3 Futures; Antalya, Turkey; Hard $10,000	(Ukraine) Artem Smirnov (Ukraine) Volodymyr Uzhylovskyi; 6–7^{(4–7)}, 6–2, [10–2]	(Spain) Carlos Boluda Purkiss (Spain) Adam Sanjurjo Hermida	(South Africa) Tucker Vorster (Ukraine) Aleksandr Lobkov	(Turkey) Barış Ergüden (Japan) Hiroyasu Ehara (United Kingdom) Richard Gabb (Serbia) Nikola Milojević
February 10	USA F5 Futures; Sunrise, United States; Clay $10,000	(Japan) Yoshihito Nishioka; 6–2, 6–3	(Brazil) Tiago Lopes	(Romania) Cătălin-Ionuț Gârd (Belgium) Arthur De Greef	(Romania) Costin Pavăl (Brazil) Pedro Sakamoto (United States) Gregory Ouellette (Portugal) Leonardo Tavares
February 10	USA F5 Futures; Sunrise, United States; Clay $10,000	(Mexico) Daniel Garza (Mexico) Hans Hach Verdugo; 7–6^{(7–4)}, 6–4	(Austria) Marc Rath (Austria) Nicolas Reissig	(Romania) Cătălin-Ionuț Gârd (Belgium) Arthur De Greef	(Romania) Costin Pavăl (Brazil) Pedro Sakamoto (United States) Gregory Ouellette (Portugal) Leonardo Tavares
February 17	Australia F1 Futures; Happy Valley, Australia; Hard $15,000	(United States) Jarmere Jenkins; 6–2, 6–3	(Australia) Luke Saville	(Australia) Jordan Thompson (Japan) Yasutaka Uchiyama	(Australia) Alex Bolt (Australia) Jake Eames (Australia) Matthew Barton (Australia) Dane Propoggia
February 17	Australia F1 Futures; Happy Valley, Australia; Hard $15,000	(New Zealand) Marcus Daniell (Australia) Dane Propoggia; 6–3, 6–2	(Japan) Takuto Niki (Japan) Yasutaka Uchiyama	(Australia) Jordan Thompson (Japan) Yasutaka Uchiyama	(Australia) Alex Bolt (Australia) Jake Eames (Australia) Matthew Barton (Australia) Dane Propoggia
February 17	Croatia F2 Futures; Zagreb, Croatia; Hard (indoor) $15,000	(Belarus) Uladzimir Ignatik; 5–7, 6–3, 6–3	(Croatia) Nikola Mektić	(France) Jonathan Eysseric (Croatia) Borna Ćorić	(Croatia) Filip Veger (United Kingdom) Peter Torebko (Moldova) Maxim Dubarenco (Croatia) Toni Androić
February 17	Croatia F2 Futures; Zagreb, Croatia; Hard (indoor) $15,000	(Croatia) Toni Androić (Croatia) Nikola Mektić; 6–3, 7–5	(Czech Republic) Marek Michalička (Czech Republic) Dominik Süč	(France) Jonathan Eysseric (Croatia) Borna Ćorić	(Croatia) Filip Veger (United Kingdom) Peter Torebko (Moldova) Maxim Dubarenco (Croatia) Toni Androić
February 17	Russia F1 Futures; Moscow, Russia; Hard (indoor) $15,000	(Russia) Anton Zaitsev; 4–6, 7–6^{(12–10)}, 7–6^{(7–4)}	(Czech Republic) Michal Schmid	(Belarus) Andrei Vasilevski (Italy) Alessandro Bega	(Ukraine) Marat Deviatiarov (Ukraine) Vadim Alekseenko (Belarus) Yaraslav Shyla (Ukraine) Vladyslav Manafov
February 17	Russia F1 Futures; Moscow, Russia; Hard (indoor) $15,000	(Belarus) Yaraslav Shyla (Belarus) Andrei Vasilevski; 7–5, 4–6, [10–8]	(Russia) Anton Galkin (Russia) Ilya Lebedev	(Belarus) Andrei Vasilevski (Italy) Alessandro Bega	(Ukraine) Marat Deviatiarov (Ukraine) Vadim Alekseenko (Belarus) Yaraslav Shyla (Ukraine) Vladyslav Manafov
February 17	Egypt F6 Futures; Sharm El Sheikh, Egypt; Clay	(Austria) Dennis Novak; 6–4, 6–4	(Spain) Marc Giner	(Morocco) Yassine Idmbarek (Serbia) Nikola Ćirić	(Chile) David Fleming (Austria) Bastian Trinker (Czech Republic) Libor Salaba (Italy) Alberto Brizzi
February 17	Egypt F6 Futures; Sharm El Sheikh, Egypt; Clay	(Serbia) Nikola Ćirić (Greece) Alexandros Jakupovic; 6–3, 6–3	(Italy) Riccardo Bonadio (Italy) Antonio Mastrelia	(Morocco) Yassine Idmbarek (Serbia) Nikola Ćirić	(Chile) David Fleming (Austria) Bastian Trinker (Czech Republic) Libor Salaba (Italy) Alberto Brizzi
February 17	El Salvador F1 Futures; Santa Tecla, El Salvador; Clay $10,000	(France) Éric Prodon; 5–7, 6–1, 6–2	(Colombia) Michael Quintero	(Spain) Enrique López Pérez (El Salvador) Marcelo Arévalo	(Japan) Ryotaro Matsumura (Brazil) Pedro Bernardi (Brazil) Fabiano de Paula (Uruguay) Rodrigo Senattore
February 17	El Salvador F1 Futures; Santa Tecla, El Salvador; Clay $10,000	(Argentina) Mateo Nicolas Martínez (Peru) Rodrigo Sánchez; 3–6, 7–6^{(7–4)}, [13–11]	(El Salvador) Marcelo Arévalo (Spain) Enrique López Pérez	(Spain) Enrique López Pérez (El Salvador) Marcelo Arévalo	(Japan) Ryotaro Matsumura (Brazil) Pedro Bernardi (Brazil) Fabiano de Paula (Uruguay) Rodrigo Senattore
February 17	Great Britain F5 Futures; Nottingham, United Kingdom; Hard (indoor) $10,000	(United Kingdom) Daniel Smethurst; 6–3, 6–2	(United Kingdom) Edward Corrie	(Finland) Micke Kontinen (United Kingdom) Luke Bambridge	(United Kingdom) Neil Pauffley (United Kingdom) Liam Broady (United Kingdom) Ashley Hewitt (Sweden) Isak Arvidsson
February 17	Great Britain F5 Futures; Nottingham, United Kingdom; Hard (indoor) $10,000	(France) Rémi Boutillier (France) Quentin Halys; 6–2, 0–6, [10–8]	(United Kingdom) Liam Broady (Republic of Ireland) James Cluskey	(Finland) Micke Kontinen (United Kingdom) Luke Bambridge	(United Kingdom) Neil Pauffley (United Kingdom) Liam Broady (United Kingdom) Ashley Hewitt (Sweden) Isak Arvidsson
February 17	Italy F2 Futures; Rovereto, Italy; Carpet (indoor) $10,000	(Italy) Luca Vanni; 6–3, 6–3	(Italy) Stefano Napolitano	(Poland) Błażej Koniusz (Germany) Maximilian Marterer	(Germany) Moritz Baumann (Serbia) Denis Bejtulahi (Czech Republic) Roman Jebavý (Italy) Riccardo Sinicropi
February 17	Italy F2 Futures; Rovereto, Italy; Carpet (indoor) $10,000	(Italy) Marco Crugnola (Italy) Luca Vanni; 6–4, 6–4	(France) Fabrice Martin (France) Hugo Nys	(Poland) Błażej Koniusz (Germany) Maximilian Marterer	(Germany) Moritz Baumann (Serbia) Denis Bejtulahi (Czech Republic) Roman Jebavý (Italy) Riccardo Sinicropi
February 17	Portugal F3 Futures; Faro, Portugal; Hard $10,000	(Spain) Andrés Artuñedo; 6–4, 6–2	(France) Tristan Lamasine	(Czech Republic) Adam Pavlásek (Portugal) Frederico Ferreira Silva	(Portugal) Romain Barbosa (Germany) Sami Reinwein (Belgium) Julien Cagnina (France) Maxime Janvier
February 17	Portugal F3 Futures; Faro, Portugal; Hard $10,000	(Portugal) Frederico Gil (Portugal) Frederico Ferreira Silva; 6–1, 6–4	(Spain) Juan Samuel Arauzo Martínez (Spain) Jaime Pulgar García	(Czech Republic) Adam Pavlásek (Portugal) Frederico Ferreira Silva	(Portugal) Romain Barbosa (Germany) Sami Reinwein (Belgium) Julien Cagnina (France) Maxime Janvier
February 17	Spain F3 Futures; Murcia, Spain; Clay $10,000	(Sweden) Markus Eriksson; 7–6^{(7–2)}, 3–6, 7–5	(Spain) Roberto Carballés Baena	(Croatia) Kristijan Mesaroš (Spain) José Checa Calvo	(Australia) Jason Kubler (Spain) Juan Lizariturry (Spain) Albert Alcaraz Ivorra (Spain) Marcos Giraldi Requena
February 17	Spain F3 Futures; Murcia, Spain; Clay $10,000	(Sweden) Markus Eriksson (Sweden) Milos Sekulic; 6–0, 7–6^{(7–5)}	(Spain) Sergio Gutiérrez Ferrol (Spain) David Vega Hernández	(Croatia) Kristijan Mesaroš (Spain) José Checa Calvo	(Australia) Jason Kubler (Spain) Juan Lizariturry (Spain) Albert Alcaraz Ivorra (Spain) Marcos Giraldi Requena
February 17	Thailand F2 Futures; Nonthaburi, Thailand; Hard $10,000	(France) Alexis Musialek; Walkover	(Thailand) Danai Udomchoke	(Switzerland) Michael Lammer (United Kingdom) Lewis Burton	(France) Grégoire Barrère (United Kingdom) Marcus Willis (France) Maxime Forcin (Thailand) Kittipong Wachiramanowong
February 17	Thailand F2 Futures; Nonthaburi, Thailand; Hard $10,000	(South Korea) Chung Hyeon (South Korea) Nam Ji-sung; 6–4, 6–7^{(4–7)}, [10–7]	(United Kingdom) Lewis Burton (United Kingdom) Marcus Willis	(Switzerland) Michael Lammer (United Kingdom) Lewis Burton	(France) Grégoire Barrère (United Kingdom) Marcus Willis (France) Maxime Forcin (Thailand) Kittipong Wachiramanowong
February 17	Turkey F4 Futures; Antalya, Turkey; Hard $10,000	(Belgium) Kimmer Coppejans; 7–5, 6–2	(France) Enzo Couacaud	(Japan) Hiroyasu Ehara (Slovakia) Jozef Kovalík	(United Kingdom) Richard Gabb (Ukraine) Artem Smirnov (Italy) Pietro Licciardi (France) Julien Demois
February 17	Turkey F4 Futures; Antalya, Turkey; Hard $10,000	(Monaco) Romain Arneodo (France) Enzo Couacaud; 6–3, 6–0	(United Kingdom) Richard Gabb (United Kingdom) Jonny O'Mara	(Japan) Hiroyasu Ehara (Slovakia) Jozef Kovalík	(United Kingdom) Richard Gabb (Ukraine) Artem Smirnov (Italy) Pietro Licciardi (France) Julien Demois
February 17	USA F6 Futures; Boynton Beach, United States; Clay $10,000	(Germany) Yannick Maden; 7–6^{(7–5)}, 6–1	(United States) Eric Quigley	(Brazil) Tiago Lopes (United States) Dennis Nevolo	(Chile) Bastián Malla (Sweden) Christian Lindell (Barbados) Darian King (Romania) Cătălin-Ionuț Gârd
February 17	USA F6 Futures; Boynton Beach, United States; Clay $10,000	(United States) Collin Altamirano (United States) Deiton Baughman; 6–4, 6–4	(Mexico) Daniel Garza (Barbados) Darian King	(Brazil) Tiago Lopes (United States) Dennis Nevolo	(Chile) Bastián Malla (Sweden) Christian Lindell (Barbados) Darian King (Romania) Cătălin-Ionuț Gârd
February 24	Australia F2 Futures; Port Pirie, Australia; Hard $15,000	(Australia) Luke Saville; 6–2, 3–1 ret.	(Australia) Jordan Thompson	(Australia) Alex Bolt (Japan) Yasutaka Uchiyama	(Australia) Christopher O'Connell (Australia) Andrew Whittington (Australia) Jacob Grills (Australia) Ryan Agar
February 24	Australia F2 Futures; Port Pirie, Australia; Hard $15,000	(Australia) Maverick Banes (Australia) Gavin van Peperzeel; 6–3, 6–3	(Australia) Bradley Mousley (Australia) Jordan Thompson	(Australia) Alex Bolt (Japan) Yasutaka Uchiyama	(Australia) Christopher O'Connell (Australia) Andrew Whittington (Australia) Jacob Grills (Australia) Ryan Agar
February 24	France F4 Futures; Lille, France; Hard (indoor) $15,000	(Belgium) Yannick Mertens; 6–2, 6–1	(France) Mathieu Rodrigues	(Spain) Iván Arenas Gualda (France) Jonathan Eysseric	(France) Hugo Nys (France) Constant Lestienne (Belgium) Olivier Rochus (France) Sadio Doumbia
February 24	France F4 Futures; Lille, France; Hard (indoor) $15,000	(Belgium) Maxime Authom (France) Jonathan Eysseric; 6–4, 6–3	(Spain) Juan Samuel Arauzo Martínez (Spain) Iván Arenas Gualda	(Spain) Iván Arenas Gualda (France) Jonathan Eysseric	(France) Hugo Nys (France) Constant Lestienne (Belgium) Olivier Rochus (France) Sadio Doumbia
February 24	Italy F3 Futures; Trento, Italy; Hard (indoor) $15,000	(Croatia) Nikola Mektić; 6–3, 5–7, 6–1	(Czech Republic) Roman Jebavý	(Germany) Moritz Baumann (Italy) Riccardo Bellotti	(Italy) Andrea Basso (Italy) Matteo Trevisan (Italy) Filippo Leonardi (Czech Republic) Marek Michalička
February 24	Italy F3 Futures; Trento, Italy; Hard (indoor) $15,000	(Germany) Kevin Krawietz (France) Fabrice Martin; 6–3, 6–1	(Poland) Błażej Koniusz (Italy) Matteo Volante	(Germany) Moritz Baumann (Italy) Riccardo Bellotti	(Italy) Andrea Basso (Italy) Matteo Trevisan (Italy) Filippo Leonardi (Czech Republic) Marek Michalička
February 24	Russia F2 Futures; Yoshkar-Ola, Russia; Hard (indoor) $15,000	(Ukraine) Denys Molchanov; 6–4, 6–0	(Russia) Mikhail Biryukov	(Russia) Aslan Karatsev (Belarus) Siarhei Betau	(Russia) Stanislav Vovk (Russia) Denis Matsukevich (Belarus) Dzmitry Zhyrmont (Belarus) Aliaksandr Bury
February 24	Russia F2 Futures; Yoshkar-Ola, Russia; Hard (indoor) $15,000	(Russia) Mikhail Biryukov (Ukraine) Denys Molchanov; 7–6^{(7–5)}, 6–7^{(9–11)}, [10–5]	(Russia) Denis Matsukevich (Russia) Stanislav Vovk	(Russia) Aslan Karatsev (Belarus) Siarhei Betau	(Russia) Stanislav Vovk (Russia) Denis Matsukevich (Belarus) Dzmitry Zhyrmont (Belarus) Aliaksandr Bury
February 24	Egypt F7 Futures; Sharm El Sheikh, Egypt; Clay $10,000	(Chile) Hans Podlipnik Castillo; 6–3, 4–6, 6–4	(Germany) Steven Moneke	(Spain) Marc Giner (Egypt) Mazen Osama	(Greece) Alexandros Jakupovic (Egypt) Karim-Mohamed Maamoun (Russia) Ivan Nedelko (Italy) Alberto Brizzi
February 24	Egypt F7 Futures; Sharm El Sheikh, Egypt; Clay $10,000	(Egypt) Karim-Mohamed Maamoun (Colombia) Cristian Rodríguez; 6–3, 6–3	(Brazil) Alex Blumenberg (Brazil) Lucas Meirelles Guitarrari	(Spain) Marc Giner (Egypt) Mazen Osama	(Greece) Alexandros Jakupovic (Egypt) Karim-Mohamed Maamoun (Russia) Ivan Nedelko (Italy) Alberto Brizzi
February 24	Great Britain F6 Futures; Shrewsbury, United Kingdom; Hard (indoor) $10,000	(Sweden) Isak Arvidsson; 6–3, 7–5	(Finland) Micke Kontinen	(France) Gleb Sakharov (United Kingdom) Joshua Milton	(United Kingdom) Daniel Cox (Sweden) Elias Ymer (United Kingdom) Liam Broady (United Kingdom) Ashley Hewitt
February 24	Great Britain F6 Futures; Shrewsbury, United Kingdom; Hard (indoor) $10,000	(United Kingdom) Luke Bambridge (United Kingdom) Toby Martin; 6–3, 6–4	(Sweden) Isak Arvidsson (Finland) Micke Kontinen	(France) Gleb Sakharov (United Kingdom) Joshua Milton	(United Kingdom) Daniel Cox (Sweden) Elias Ymer (United Kingdom) Liam Broady (United Kingdom) Ashley Hewitt
February 24	India F1 Futures; Chandigarh, India; Hard $10,000	(Netherlands) Antal van der Duim; 7–5, 6–3	(India) Vishnu Vardhan	(India) N. Sriram Balaji (India) Sanam Singh	(India) Ronit Singh Bisht (Japan) Ko Suzuki (India) Ramkumar Ramanathan (France) Mathias Bourgue
February 24	India F1 Futures; Chandigarh, India; Hard $10,000	(India) N. Sriram Balaji (India) Ranjeet Virali-Murugesan; 6–4, 6–4	(India) Vivek Shokeen (India) Sanam Singh	(India) N. Sriram Balaji (India) Sanam Singh	(India) Ronit Singh Bisht (Japan) Ko Suzuki (India) Ramkumar Ramanathan (France) Mathias Bourgue
February 24	Iran F1 Futures; Kish, Iran; Hard $10,000	(Romania) Victor Crivoi; 7–6^{(8–6)}, 7–6^{(7–5)}	(Croatia) Toni Androić	(Austria) Michael Linzer (Romania) Patrick Ciorcilă	(Netherlands) Wesley Koolhof (Brazil) Thales Turini (Ukraine) Vadim Alekseenko (Serbia) Peđa Krstin
February 24	Iran F1 Futures; Kish, Iran; Hard $10,000	(Brazil) Caio Silva (Brazil) Thales Turini; 7–6^{(7–3)}, 6–1	(Netherlands) Stephan Fransen (Netherlands) Wesley Koolhof	(Austria) Michael Linzer (Romania) Patrick Ciorcilă	(Netherlands) Wesley Koolhof (Brazil) Thales Turini (Ukraine) Vadim Alekseenko (Serbia) Peđa Krstin
February 24	Kazakhstan F1 Futures; Aktobe, Kazakhstan; Hard (indoor) $10,000	(Russia) Alexey Vatutin; 6–7^{(4–7)}, 6–4, 6–3	(Kazakhstan) Evgeny Korolev	(Slovakia) Adrian Sikora (Russia) Andrey Rublev	(Kazakhstan) Denis Yevseyev (Russia) Vitaliy Kachanovskiy (Italy) Matteo Donati (Slovakia) Marek Semjan
February 24	Kazakhstan F1 Futures; Aktobe, Kazakhstan; Hard (indoor) $10,000	(Belarus) Yaraslav Shyla (Belarus) Andrei Vasilevski; 6–3, 3–6, [12–10]	(Georgia (country)) Aleksandre Metreveli (Kazakhstan) Denis Yevseyev	(Slovakia) Adrian Sikora (Russia) Andrey Rublev	(Kazakhstan) Denis Yevseyev (Russia) Vitaliy Kachanovskiy (Italy) Matteo Donati (Slovakia) Marek Semjan
February 24	Spain F4 Futures; Cartagena, Spain; Clay $10,000	(Poland) Kamil Majchrzak; 1–6, 7–6^{(7–4)}, 6–3	(Spain) Roberto Carballés Baena	(Italy) Lorenzo Giustino (France) Johan Tatlot	(Germany) Jean-Marc Werner (Venezuela) Ricardo Rodríguez (Colombia) Juan Sebastián Gómez (Spain) Marcos Giraldi Requena
February 24	Spain F4 Futures; Cartagena, Spain; Clay $10,000	(France) Enzo Py (France) Johan Tatlot; 6–0, 6–4	(Colombia) Tomás Builes (Spain) Iván Gómez Mantilla	(Italy) Lorenzo Giustino (France) Johan Tatlot	(Germany) Jean-Marc Werner (Venezuela) Ricardo Rodríguez (Colombia) Juan Sebastián Gómez (Spain) Marcos Giraldi Requena
February 24	Thailand F3 Futures; Nonthaburi, Thailand; Hard $10,000	(South Korea) Chung Hyeon; 6–2, 6–4	(United Kingdom) Marcus Willis	(Slovakia) Ivo Klec (Japan) Takashi Saito	(Croatia) Matija Pecotić (South Korea) Chung Hong (South Korea) Na Jung-woong (South Korea) Lee Duck-hee
February 24	Thailand F3 Futures; Nonthaburi, Thailand; Hard $10,000	(United Kingdom) Lewis Burton (United Kingdom) Marcus Willis; 6–3, 7–5	(South Korea) Chung Hyeon (South Korea) Nam Ji-sung	(Slovakia) Ivo Klec (Japan) Takashi Saito	(Croatia) Matija Pecotić (South Korea) Chung Hong (South Korea) Na Jung-woong (South Korea) Lee Duck-hee
February 24	Turkey F5 Futures; Antalya, Turkey; Hard $10,000	(Bosnia and Herzegovina) Tomislav Brkić; 6–2, 3–6, 7–5	(Bosnia and Herzegovina) Aldin Šetkić	(Germany) Tim Nekic (South Africa) Tucker Vorster	(Belgium) Kimmer Coppejans (Austria) Mario Haider-Maurer (Belgium) Jonas Merckx (Austria) Bastian Trinker
February 24	Turkey F5 Futures; Antalya, Turkey; Hard $10,000	(Ukraine) Sergey Bubka (Germany) Sami Reinwein; 1–6, 7–6^{(7–5)}, [10–7]	(United States) Sean Berman (South Africa) Tucker Vorster	(Germany) Tim Nekic (South Africa) Tucker Vorster	(Belgium) Kimmer Coppejans (Austria) Mario Haider-Maurer (Belgium) Jonas Merckx (Austria) Bastian Trinker
February 24	USA F7 Futures; Sunrise, United States; Clay $10,000	(Barbados) Darian King; 6–7^{(2–7)}, 7–5, 6–1	(Austria) Marc Rath	(Sweden) Christian Lindell (Brazil) Augusto Laranja	(United States) Collin Altamirano (United States) Frances Tiafoe (Brazil) Pedro Sakamoto (United States) Deiton Baughman
February 24	USA F7 Futures; Sunrise, United States; Clay $10,000	(United States) Jean-Yves Aubone (United States) Vahid Mirzadeh; Walkover	(United States) Collin Altamirano (United States) Deiton Baughman	(Sweden) Christian Lindell (Brazil) Augusto Laranja	(United States) Collin Altamirano (United States) Frances Tiafoe (Brazil) Pedro Sakamoto (United States) Deiton Baughman

=== March ===
Week of	Tournament	Winner	Runners-up	Semifinalists	Quarterfinalists
March 3	Australia F3 Futures; Mildura, Australia; Grass $15,000	(Australia) Luke Saville; 7–5, 6–7^{(5–7)}, 6–0	(Australia) Dane Propoggia	(Australia) Brydan Klein (Australia) Matthew Barton	(Australia) Jordan Thompson (Australia) Gavin van Peperzeel (Australia) Andrew Whittington (Australia) Alex Bolt
March 3	Australia F3 Futures; Mildura, Australia; Grass $15,000	(Australia) Ryan Agar (Australia) Gavin van Peperzeel; 7–5, 6–4	(Australia) Jacob Grills (Australia) Dane Propoggia	(Australia) Brydan Klein (Australia) Matthew Barton	(Australia) Jordan Thompson (Australia) Gavin van Peperzeel (Australia) Andrew Whittington (Australia) Alex Bolt
March 3	Canada F1 Futures; Gatineau, Canada; Hard (indoor) $15,000	(United Kingdom) Daniel Smethurst; 6–2, 6–3	(Bulgaria) Dimitar Kutrovsky	(United Kingdom) Edward Corrie (United Kingdom) Richard Gabb	(United States) Alexios Halebian (Switzerland) Adrien Bossel (Germany) Torsten Wietoska (Belgium) Germain Gigounon
March 3	Canada F1 Futures; Gatineau, Canada; Hard (indoor) $15,000	(United Kingdom) Edward Corrie (United Kingdom) Daniel Smethurst; 7–6^{(7–4)}, 6–1	(Canada) Kamil Pajkowski (Canada) Filip Peliwo	(United Kingdom) Edward Corrie (United Kingdom) Richard Gabb	(United States) Alexios Halebian (Switzerland) Adrien Bossel (Germany) Torsten Wietoska (Belgium) Germain Gigounon
March 3	China F1 Futures; Guangzhou, China; Hard $15,000	(China) Li Zhe; 6–7^{(4–7)}, 7–6^{(7–3)}, 6–1	(China) Bai Yan	(Republic of Ireland) Louk Sorensen (China) Zhang Ze	(South Korea) Chung Hyeon (China) Gao Xin (China) Ouyang Bowen (Italy) Claudio Grassi
March 3	China F1 Futures; Guangzhou, China; Hard $15,000	(Moldova) Radu Albot (Indonesia) Christopher Rungkat; 1–6, 7–5, [10–7]	(Italy) Riccardo Ghedin (Italy) Claudio Grassi	(Republic of Ireland) Louk Sorensen (China) Zhang Ze	(South Korea) Chung Hyeon (China) Gao Xin (China) Ouyang Bowen (Italy) Claudio Grassi
March 3	Egypt F8 Futures; Sharm El Sheikh, Egypt; Clay $10,000	(Chile) Hans Podlipnik Castillo; 6–4, 4–6, 6–4	(Italy) Stefano Travaglia	(Morocco) Mehdi Ziadi (Germany) Steven Moneke	(Egypt) Mazen Osama (Egypt) Sherif Sabry (North Macedonia) Tomislav Jotovski (North Macedonia) Shendrit Deari
March 3	Egypt F8 Futures; Sharm El Sheikh, Egypt; Clay $10,000	(Romania) Cătălin-Ionuț Gârd (Germany) Steven Moneke; 6–2, 7–5	(Switzerland) Stefan Fiacan (Finland) Henrik Sillanpää	(Morocco) Mehdi Ziadi (Germany) Steven Moneke	(Egypt) Mazen Osama (Egypt) Sherif Sabry (North Macedonia) Tomislav Jotovski (North Macedonia) Shendrit Deari
March 3	France F5 Futures; Toulouse–Balma, France; Hard (indoor) $10,000	(France) Rudy Coco; 6–2, 6–4	(France) Tristan Lamasine	(Belgium) Maxime Authom (France) Sadio Doumbia	(France) Michael Bois (France) Fabien Reboul (France) Teri Groll (France) Enzo Py
March 3	France F5 Futures; Toulouse–Balma, France; Hard (indoor) $10,000	(France) Antoine Benneteau (France) Alexis Musialek; 6–3, 6–2	(Spain) Carlos Boluda Purkiss (Spain) Roberto Ortega Olmedo	(Belgium) Maxime Authom (France) Sadio Doumbia	(France) Michael Bois (France) Fabien Reboul (France) Teri Groll (France) Enzo Py
March 3	Great Britain F7 Futures; Preston, United Kingdom; Hard (indoor) $10,000	(Netherlands) Antal van der Duim; 7–6^{(7–1)} 6–2	(Netherlands) Thomas Schoorel	(United Kingdom) Tom Farquharson (United Kingdom) David Rice	(United Kingdom) Robert Carter (United Kingdom) Imran Aswat (United Kingdom) George Coupland (Denmark) Frederik Nielsen
March 3	Great Britain F7 Futures; Preston, United Kingdom; Hard (indoor) $10,000	(United Kingdom) Luke Bambridge (United Kingdom) Liam Broady; 6–4, 6–4	(Denmark) Frederik Nielsen (United Kingdom) Joshua Ward-Hibbert	(United Kingdom) Tom Farquharson (United Kingdom) David Rice	(United Kingdom) Robert Carter (United Kingdom) Imran Aswat (United Kingdom) George Coupland (Denmark) Frederik Nielsen
March 3	India F2 Futures; Bhimavaram, India; Hard $10,000+H	(India) Saketh Myneni; 4–6, 6–3, 6–1	(India) Sanam Singh	(India) N. Sriram Balaji (India) Vishnu Vardhan	(India) Chandril Sood (Japan) Ko Suzuki (India) Sasikumar Mukund (India) Jeevan Nedunchezhiyan
March 3	India F2 Futures; Bhimavaram, India; Hard $10,000+H	(India) Saketh Myneni (India) Sanam Singh; 7–6^{(7–5)}, 6–3	(India) N. Sriram Balaji (India) Ranjeet Virali-Murugesan	(India) N. Sriram Balaji (India) Vishnu Vardhan	(India) Chandril Sood (Japan) Ko Suzuki (India) Sasikumar Mukund (India) Jeevan Nedunchezhiyan
March 3	Iran F2 Futures; Kish, Iran; Clay $10,000	(Serbia) Peđa Krstin; 6–4, 6–1	(Romania) Victor Crivoi	(Croatia) Toni Androić (Austria) Michael Linzer	(Romania) Patrick Ciorcilă (Russia) Alexander Zhurbin (Brazil) Thales Turini (Monaco) Benjamin Balleret
March 3	Iran F2 Futures; Kish, Iran; Clay $10,000	(Netherlands) Stephan Fransen (Netherlands) Wesley Koolhof; 5–7, 7–5, [10–6]	(Venezuela) Jordi Muñoz Abreu (Netherlands) Mark Vervoort	(Croatia) Toni Androić (Austria) Michael Linzer	(Romania) Patrick Ciorcilă (Russia) Alexander Zhurbin (Brazil) Thales Turini (Monaco) Benjamin Balleret
March 3	Italy F4 Futures; Palermo, Italy; Clay $10,000	(Italy) Simone Vagnozzi; 6–3 ,6–2	(France) Maxime Chazal	(Italy) Omar Giacalone (Italy) Matteo Marrai	(Italy) Claudio Fortuna (France) Jonathan Eysseric (Italy) Ferdinando Bonuccelli (Slovakia) Filip Horanský
March 3	Italy F4 Futures; Palermo, Italy; Clay $10,000	(Italy) Salvatore Caruso (Italy) Omar Giacalone; 6–1, 6–3	(Italy) Davide Melchiorre (Italy) Riccardo Sinicropi	(Italy) Omar Giacalone (Italy) Matteo Marrai	(Italy) Claudio Fortuna (France) Jonathan Eysseric (Italy) Ferdinando Bonuccelli (Slovakia) Filip Horanský
March 3	Kazakhstan F2 Futures; Aktobe, Kazakhstan; Hard (indoor) $10,000	(Russia) Andrey Rublev; 6–4, 3–6, 6–3	(Belarus) Yaraslav Shyla	(Slovakia) Marek Semjan (Russia) Alexey Vatutin	(Kazakhstan) Denis Yevseyev (Georgia (country)) Aleksandre Metreveli (Uzbekistan) Temur Ismailov (Estonia) Vladimir Ivanov
March 3	Kazakhstan F2 Futures; Aktobe, Kazakhstan; Hard (indoor) $10,000	(Belarus) Yaraslav Shyla (Belarus) Andrei Vasilevski; 6–3, 5–7, [10–4]	(Russia) Ilya Lebedev (Russia) Dmitry Surchenko	(Slovakia) Marek Semjan (Russia) Alexey Vatutin	(Kazakhstan) Denis Yevseyev (Georgia (country)) Aleksandre Metreveli (Uzbekistan) Temur Ismailov (Estonia) Vladimir Ivanov
March 3	Spain F5 Futures; Reus, Spain; Clay $10,000	(Spain) Jordi Samper Montaña; 6–3, 4–6, 7–5	(Italy) Lorenzo Giustino	(Australia) Jason Kubler (Morocco) Lamine Ouahab	(Spain) Juan Samuel Arauzo Martínez (Spain) Marcos Giraldi Requena (Venezuela) Ricardo Rodríguez (Spain) David Pérez Sanz
March 3	Spain F5 Futures; Reus, Spain; Clay $10,000	(Australia) Jason Kubler (Spain) Pol Toledo Bagué; 6–4, 6–1	(Spain) Iván Gómez Mantilla (Portugal) Gonçalo Oliveira	(Australia) Jason Kubler (Morocco) Lamine Ouahab	(Spain) Juan Samuel Arauzo Martínez (Spain) Marcos Giraldi Requena (Venezuela) Ricardo Rodríguez (Spain) David Pérez Sanz
March 3	Turkey F6 Futures; Antalya, Turkey; Hard $10,000	(Bosnia and Herzegovina) Aldin Šetkić; 6–3, 6–2	(Belgium) Kimmer Coppejans	(Bosnia and Herzegovina) Mirza Bašić (Bosnia and Herzegovina) Tomislav Brkić	(United States) Jared Donaldson (Switzerland) Michael Lammer (Germany) Tim Nekic (Germany) Sami Reinwein
March 3	Turkey F6 Futures; Antalya, Turkey; Hard $10,000	(Italy) Erik Crepaldi (Bosnia and Herzegovina) Aldin Šetkić; 6–4, 6–4	(Bosnia and Herzegovina) Tomislav Brkić (Austria) Bastian Trinker	(Bosnia and Herzegovina) Mirza Bašić (Bosnia and Herzegovina) Tomislav Brkić	(United States) Jared Donaldson (Switzerland) Michael Lammer (Germany) Tim Nekic (Germany) Sami Reinwein
March 3	Ukraine F1 Futures; Cherkasy, Ukraine; Hard $10,000	(Ukraine) Artem Smirnov; 7-6^{(7–4)}, 6-3	(Ukraine) Volodymyr Uzhylovskyi	(Croatia) Filip Veger (Latvia) Jānis Podžus	(Italy) Stefano Napolitano (Ukraine) Yurii Dzhavakian (Germany) Lukas Rüpke (Ukraine) Vadym Ursu
March 3	Ukraine F1 Futures; Cherkasy, Ukraine; Hard $10,000	(Ukraine) Vladyslav Manafov (Croatia) Filip Veger; 6–2, 7–5	(Latvia) Jānis Podžus (Latvia) Mārtiņš Podžus	(Croatia) Filip Veger (Latvia) Jānis Podžus	(Italy) Stefano Napolitano (Ukraine) Yurii Dzhavakian (Germany) Lukas Rüpke (Ukraine) Vadym Ursu
March 10	Canada F2 Futures; Sherbrooke, Canada; Hard (indoor) $15,000	(Bulgaria) Dimitar Kutrovsky; 6–4, 3–6, 6–2	(United Kingdom) Edward Corrie	(Canada) Filip Peliwo (United Kingdom) Daniel Smethurst	(France) Vincent Millot (Belgium) Olivier Rochus (Canada) Hugo Di Feo (United States) Eric Quigley
March 10	Canada F2 Futures; Sherbrooke, Canada; Hard (indoor) $15,000	(United Kingdom) Edward Corrie (United Kingdom) Daniel Smethurst; 3–6, 6–3, [10–1]	(Slovenia) Tom Kočevar-Dešman (Germany) Torsten Wietoska	(Canada) Filip Peliwo (United Kingdom) Daniel Smethurst	(France) Vincent Millot (Belgium) Olivier Rochus (Canada) Hugo Di Feo (United States) Eric Quigley
March 10	China F2 Futures; Guangzhou, China; Hard $15,000	(Republic of Ireland) Louk Sorensen; 5–7, 7–5, 6–4	(Israel) Amir Weintraub	(Italy) Gianluigi Quinzi (Japan) Yasutaka Uchiyama	(Moldova) Radu Albot (China) Zhang Ze (Chinese Taipei) Chen Ti (Italy) Riccardo Ghedin
March 10	China F2 Futures; Guangzhou, China; Hard $15,000	(Italy) Riccardo Ghedin (Italy) Claudio Grassi; 6–4, 6–1	(Chinese Taipei) Chen Ti (South Africa) Ruan Roelofse	(Italy) Gianluigi Quinzi (Japan) Yasutaka Uchiyama	(Moldova) Radu Albot (China) Zhang Ze (Chinese Taipei) Chen Ti (Italy) Riccardo Ghedin
March 10	France F6 Futures; Poitiers, France; Hard (indoor) $15,000+H	(France) David Guez; 6–4, 6–0	(United States) Noah Rubin	(Slovakia) Karol Beck (France) Sadio Doumbia	(Belgium) Yannick Mertens (France) Alexis Musialek (Belgium) Niels Desein (France) Grégoire Burquier
March 10	France F6 Futures; Poitiers, France; Hard (indoor) $15,000+H	(Sweden) Isak Arvidsson (Sweden) Markus Eriksson; Walkover	(Belgium) Niels Desein (Belgium) Yannick Mertens	(Slovakia) Karol Beck (France) Sadio Doumbia	(Belgium) Yannick Mertens (France) Alexis Musialek (Belgium) Niels Desein (France) Grégoire Burquier
March 10	USA F8 Futures; Bakersfield, United States; Hard $15,000	(United States) Daniel Kosakowski; 6–4, 3–6, 6–4	(United States) Mitchell Krueger	(Czech Republic) Marek Michalička (United States) Collin Altamirano	(United States) Sekou Bangoura (Croatia) Mate Pavić (Barbados) Darian King (United States) Deiton Baughman
March 10	USA F8 Futures; Bakersfield, United States; Hard $15,000	(United States) Sekou Bangoura (United States) Evan King; 5–7, 6–4, [10–5]	(Poland) Adam Chadaj (Czech Republic) Marek Michalička	(Czech Republic) Marek Michalička (United States) Collin Altamirano	(United States) Sekou Bangoura (Croatia) Mate Pavić (Barbados) Darian King (United States) Deiton Baughman
March 10	Argentina F4 Futures; Marcos Juárez, Argentina; Clay $10,000	(Argentina) Juan Ignacio Londero; 6–2, 6–4	(Argentina) Andrés Molteni	(Argentina) Valentin Florez (Argentina) Juan Pablo Paz	(Argentina) Nicolás Kicker (France) Johan Tatlot (Argentina) Facundo Mena (Brazil) Leonardo Kirche
March 10	Argentina F4 Futures; Marcos Juárez, Argentina; Clay $10,000	(Bolivia) Hugo Dellien (Argentina) Maximiliano Estévez; 6–3, 6–4	(Argentina) Juan Ignacio Londero (Argentina) Andrés Molteni	(Argentina) Valentin Florez (Argentina) Juan Pablo Paz	(Argentina) Nicolás Kicker (France) Johan Tatlot (Argentina) Facundo Mena (Brazil) Leonardo Kirche
March 10	Croatia F3 Futures; Vrsar, Croatia; Clay $10,000	(Belarus) Uladzimir Ignatik; 6–2, 6–4	(France) Tak Khunn Wang	(Croatia) Kristijan Mesaroš (Croatia) Tomislav Brkić	(Romania) Petru-Alexandru Luncanu (Moldova) Maxim Dubarenco (Croatia) Antonio Šančić (Slovakia) Adrian Partl
March 10	Croatia F3 Futures; Vrsar, Croatia; Clay $10,000	(Romania) Nicolae Frunză (Romania) Petru-Alexandru Luncanu; 6–2, 7–6^{(7–5)}	(Croatia) Tomislav Draganja (Croatia) Dino Marcan	(Croatia) Kristijan Mesaroš (Croatia) Tomislav Brkić	(Romania) Petru-Alexandru Luncanu (Moldova) Maxim Dubarenco (Croatia) Antonio Šančić (Slovakia) Adrian Partl
March 10	Egypt F9 Futures; Sharm El Sheikh, Egypt; Clay $10,000	(Egypt) Mohamed Safwat; 6–3, 6–3	(Egypt) Sherif Sabry	(Romania) Cătălin-Ionuț Gârd (Chile) Hans Podlipnik Castillo	(North Macedonia) Tomislav Jotovski (Morocco) Ayoub Chakrouni (Egypt) Karim Hossam (Hungary) Gergely Madarász
March 10	Egypt F9 Futures; Sharm El Sheikh, Egypt; Clay $10,000	(Egypt) Mohamed Safwat (Egypt) Sherif Sabry; 6–2, 6–3	(Egypt) Karim Hossam (Egypt) Mazen Osama	(Romania) Cătălin-Ionuț Gârd (Chile) Hans Podlipnik Castillo	(North Macedonia) Tomislav Jotovski (Morocco) Ayoub Chakrouni (Egypt) Karim Hossam (Hungary) Gergely Madarász
March 10	Great Britain F8 Futures; Tipton, United Kingdom; Hard (indoor) $10,000	(United Kingdom) Marcus Willis; 7–6^{(7–4)}, 6–4	(Republic of Ireland) Sam Barry	(United Kingdom) David Rice (Italy) Luca Vanni	(United Kingdom) Tom Farquharson (United Kingdom) Neil Pauffley (Germany) Tom Schonenberg (Belgium) Julien Cagnina
March 10	Great Britain F8 Futures; Tipton, United Kingdom; Hard (indoor) $10,000	(United Kingdom) Lewis Burton (United Kingdom) Marcus Willis; 4–6, 7–6^{(7–5)}, [10–6]	(United Kingdom) David Rice (United Kingdom) Sean Thornley	(United Kingdom) David Rice (Italy) Luca Vanni	(United Kingdom) Tom Farquharson (United Kingdom) Neil Pauffley (Germany) Tom Schonenberg (Belgium) Julien Cagnina
March 10	Greece F1 Futures; Heraklion, Greece; Hard $10,000	(Slovakia) Jozef Kovalík; 6–3, 7–6^{(8–6)}	(Czech Republic) Jan Hernych	(Germany) Kevin Krawietz (Serbia) Danilo Petrović	(Bulgaria) Alexandar Lazov (France) Martin Vaïsse (United Kingdom) Oliver Golding (Greece) Alexandros Jakupovic
March 10	Greece F1 Futures; Heraklion, Greece; Hard $10,000	(United Kingdom) Oliver Golding (Greece) Alexandros Jakupovic; 6–1, 3–6, [10–5]	(Serbia) Nikola Ćaćić (Serbia) Ilija Vučić	(Germany) Kevin Krawietz (Serbia) Danilo Petrović	(Bulgaria) Alexandar Lazov (France) Martin Vaïsse (United Kingdom) Oliver Golding (Greece) Alexandros Jakupovic
March 10	India F3 Futures; Chennai, India; Clay $10,000	(Spain) Enrique López Pérez; 6–1, 4–6, 6–2	(India) Sanam Singh	(India) N. Sriram Balaji (India) Jeevan Nedunchezhiyan	(India) Ranjeet Virali-Murugesan (India) Ramkumar Ramanathan (India) Vijayant Malik (Portugal) André Gaspar Murta
March 10	India F3 Futures; Chennai, India; Clay $10,000	(India) Jeevan Nedunchezhiyan (India) Vishnu Vardhan; 7–6^{(7–1)}, 6–3	(India) N. Sriram Balaji (India) Ranjeet Virali-Murugesan	(India) N. Sriram Balaji (India) Jeevan Nedunchezhiyan	(India) Ranjeet Virali-Murugesan (India) Ramkumar Ramanathan (India) Vijayant Malik (Portugal) André Gaspar Murta
March 10	Iran F3 Futures; Kish, Iran; Clay $10,000	(Romania) Victor Crivoi; 6–4, 6–4	(Croatia) Toni Androić	(Austria) Michael Linzer (Ukraine) Vadim Alekseenko	(France) Jérôme Inzerillo (Serbia) Peđa Krstin (Netherlands) Wesley Koolhof (France) François-Arthur Vibert
March 10	Iran F3 Futures; Kish, Iran; Clay $10,000	(Croatia) Toni Androić (Croatia) Ivan Blažević; 2–6, 6–3, [10–6]	(Netherlands) Stephan Fransen (Netherlands) Wesley Koolhof	(Austria) Michael Linzer (Ukraine) Vadim Alekseenko	(France) Jérôme Inzerillo (Serbia) Peđa Krstin (Netherlands) Wesley Koolhof (France) François-Arthur Vibert
March 10	Italy F5 Futures; Pula, Italy; Clay $10,000	(Czech Republic) Adam Pavlásek; 6–3, 6–3	(Belgium) Arthur De Greef	(Italy) Gianluca Naso (Italy) Salvatore Caruso	(Italy) Alberto Cammarata (Italy) Walter Trusendi (France) Maxime Chazal (Italy) Matteo Marrai
March 10	Italy F5 Futures; Pula, Italy; Clay $10,000	(Italy) Filippo Baldi (Italy) Walter Trusendi; 6–2, 6–7^{(2–7)}, [13–11]	(Italy) Emanuele Molina (Italy) Riccardo Sinicropi	(Italy) Gianluca Naso (Italy) Salvatore Caruso	(Italy) Alberto Cammarata (Italy) Walter Trusendi (France) Maxime Chazal (Italy) Matteo Marrai
March 10	Japan F1 Futures; Nishitama, Japan; Hard $10,000	(China) Wu Di; 6–2, 6–4	(Japan) Takuto Niki	(Japan) Hiroki Kondo (Japan) Kento Takeuchi	(Thailand) Danai Udomchoke (Japan) Shintaro Imai (Japan) Gengo Kikuchi (Chinese Taipei) Huang Liang-chi
March 10	Japan F1 Futures; Nishitama, Japan; Hard $10,000	(Japan) Toshihide Matsui (Japan) Arata Onozawa; 6–4, 7–5	(Japan) Shintaro Imai (Japan) Takao Suzuki	(Japan) Hiroki Kondo (Japan) Kento Takeuchi	(Thailand) Danai Udomchoke (Japan) Shintaro Imai (Japan) Gengo Kikuchi (Chinese Taipei) Huang Liang-chi
March 10	Kazakhstan F3 Futures; Aktobe, Kazakhstan; Hard (indoor) $10,000	(Serbia) Nikola Milojević; 7–6^{(7–5)}, 6–3	(Russia) Ilya Lebedev	(Russia) Alexey Vatutin (Belarus) Andrei Vasilevski	(Georgia (country)) Aleksandre Metreveli (Kazakhstan) Denis Yevseyev (Russia) Kirill Dmitriev (Estonia) Vladimir Ivanov
March 10	Kazakhstan F3 Futures; Aktobe, Kazakhstan; Hard (indoor) $10,000	(Belarus) Yaraslav Shyla (Belarus) Andrei Vasilevski; 6–4, 6–3	(Russia) Mikhail Fufygin (Uzbekistan) Shonigmatjon Shofayziyev	(Russia) Alexey Vatutin (Belarus) Andrei Vasilevski	(Georgia (country)) Aleksandre Metreveli (Kazakhstan) Denis Yevseyev (Russia) Kirill Dmitriev (Estonia) Vladimir Ivanov
March 10	Turkey F7 Futures; Antalya-Alibey, Turkey; Clay $10,000	(Spain) Jordi Samper Montaña; 6–2, 7–6^{(7–4)}	(United States) Jared Donaldson	(Romania) Teodor-Dacian Crăciun (Germany) Maximilian Marterer	(Portugal) Frederico Ferreira Silva (Italy) Erik Crepaldi (Serbia) Laslo Djere (Serbia) Marko Tepavac
March 10	Turkey F7 Futures; Antalya-Alibey, Turkey; Clay $10,000	(Portugal) Romain Barbosa (Portugal) Frederico Ferreira Silva; 2–6, 6–4, [10–6]	(Germany) Peter Heller (Austria) Maxi Pongratz	(Romania) Teodor-Dacian Crăciun (Germany) Maximilian Marterer	(Portugal) Frederico Ferreira Silva (Italy) Erik Crepaldi (Serbia) Laslo Djere (Serbia) Marko Tepavac
March 10	Ukraine F2 Futures; Cherkasy, Ukraine; Hard (indoor) $10,000	(Ukraine) Artem Smirnov; 6–4, 4–6, 6–1	(Ukraine) Dmytro Badanov	(Canada) Érik Chvojka (Sweden) Tobias Blomgren	(France) Rémi Boutillier (Ukraine) Marat Deviatiarov (France) Constant Lestienne (Germany) Pirmin Hänle
March 10	Ukraine F2 Futures; Cherkasy, Ukraine; Hard (indoor) $10,000	(Ukraine) Artem Smirnov (Ukraine) Volodymyr Uzhylovskyi; 6–4, 6–3	(Ukraine) Vladyslav Manafov (Croatia) Filip Veger	(Canada) Érik Chvojka (Sweden) Tobias Blomgren	(France) Rémi Boutillier (Ukraine) Marat Deviatiarov (France) Constant Lestienne (Germany) Pirmin Hänle
March 17	China F3 Futures; Yuxi, China; Hard $15,000	(China) Zhang Ze; 7–6^{(7–3)}, 7–6^{(7–3)}	(South Korea) Chung Hyeon	(China) Wu Di (South Korea) Lim Yong-kyu	(Slovakia) Ivo Klec (China) Gao Peng (South Korea) Na Jung-woong (China) Li Zhe
March 17	China F3 Futures; Yuxi, China; Hard $15,000	(China) Li Zhe (China) Wu Di; 6–4, 6–4	(South Korea) Lim Yong-kyu (South Korea) Nam Ji-sung	(China) Wu Di (South Korea) Lim Yong-kyu	(Slovakia) Ivo Klec (China) Gao Peng (South Korea) Na Jung-woong (China) Li Zhe
March 17	Switzerland F1 Futures; Taverne, Switzerland; Carpet (indoor) $15,000	(Switzerland) Henri Laaksonen; 4–6, 6–4, 7–6^{(8–6)}	(Germany) Tim Pütz	(France) Grégoire Burquier (Russia) Denis Matsukevich	(France) Albano Olivetti (Switzerland) Michael Lammer (Italy) Andrea Basso (Austria) Martin Fischer
March 17	Switzerland F1 Futures; Taverne, Switzerland; Carpet (indoor) $15,000	(Sweden) Jesper Brunström (Denmark) Frederik Nielsen; 6–4, 7–6^{(7–4)}	(Lithuania) Laurynas Grigelis (Switzerland) Henri Laaksonen	(France) Grégoire Burquier (Russia) Denis Matsukevich	(France) Albano Olivetti (Switzerland) Michael Lammer (Italy) Andrea Basso (Austria) Martin Fischer
March 17	USA F9 Futures; Calabasas, United States; Hard $15,000	(United States) Marcos Giron; 6–4, 4–6, 6–4	(United States) Jason Jung	(United States) Daniel Nguyen (Croatia) Mate Pavić	(Brazil) Henrique Cunha (United States) Taylor Fritz (France) Gianni Mina (United States) Kyle McMorrow
March 17	USA F9 Futures; Calabasas, United States; Hard $15,000	(United States) Sekou Bangoura (United States) Evan King; 6–4, 6–4	(United States) Dennis Novikov (United States) Connor Smith	(United States) Daniel Nguyen (Croatia) Mate Pavić	(Brazil) Henrique Cunha (United States) Taylor Fritz (France) Gianni Mina (United States) Kyle McMorrow
March 17	Argentina F5 Futures; Rosario, Argentina; Clay $10,000	(Argentina) Juan Pablo Paz; 6–3, 6–4	(Argentina) Pedro Cachin	(Argentina) Andrés Molteni (Argentina) Juan Ignacio Galarza	(France) Johan Tatlot (Argentina) Maximiliano Estévez (Bolivia) Hugo Dellien (Argentina) Nicolás Kicker
March 17	Argentina F5 Futures; Rosario, Argentina; Clay $10,000	(Bolivia) Hugo Dellien (Argentina) Facundo Mena; 6–4, 0–6, [10–5]	(Brazil) Leonardo Kirche (Brazil) André Miele	(Argentina) Andrés Molteni (Argentina) Juan Ignacio Galarza	(France) Johan Tatlot (Argentina) Maximiliano Estévez (Bolivia) Hugo Dellien (Argentina) Nicolás Kicker
March 17	Chile F1 Futures; Santiago, Chile; Clay $10,000	(Chile) Gonzalo Lama; 6–1, 6–2	(Chile) Nicolás Jarry	(Brazil) Tiago Lopes (Chile) Ricardo Urzúa Rivera	(Brazil) Caio Zampieri (Chile) Victor Núñez (Chile) Guillermo Rivera Aránguiz (Chile) Bastián Malla
March 17	Chile F1 Futures; Santiago, Chile; Clay $10,000	(Chile) Jorge Aguilar (Chile) Guillermo Núñez; 6–7^{(1–7)}, 6–3, [10–4]	(Chile) Victor Núñez (Chile) Ricardo Urzúa Rivera	(Brazil) Tiago Lopes (Chile) Ricardo Urzúa Rivera	(Brazil) Caio Zampieri (Chile) Victor Núñez (Chile) Guillermo Rivera Aránguiz (Chile) Bastián Malla
March 17	Croatia F4 Futures; Poreč, Croatia; Clay $10,000	(Croatia) Duje Kekez; 6–1, 6–1	(Spain) Gerard Granollers	(Spain) Juan Lizariturry (Bosnia and Herzegovina) Tomislav Brkić	(Italy) Alessandro Giannessi (Slovakia) Adrian Partl (Croatia) Dino Marcan (Austria) Nicolas Reissig
March 17	Croatia F4 Futures; Poreč, Croatia; Clay $10,000	(Spain) Gerard Granollers (Spain) Oriol Roca Batalla; 6–4, 6–1	(Bulgaria) Tihomir Grozdanov (Croatia) Duje Kekez	(Spain) Juan Lizariturry (Bosnia and Herzegovina) Tomislav Brkić	(Italy) Alessandro Giannessi (Slovakia) Adrian Partl (Croatia) Dino Marcan (Austria) Nicolas Reissig
March 17	Egypt F10 Futures; Sharm El Sheikh, Egypt; Clay $10,000	(Czech Republic) Jaroslav Pospíšil; 6–1, 6–2	(Egypt) Mohamed Safwat	(Poland) Paweł Ciaś (Italy) Stefano Travaglia	(Spain) Juan Samuel Arauzo Martínez (Romania) Cătălin-Ionuț Gârd (Egypt) Mazen Osama (Slovakia) Filip Horanský
March 17	Egypt F10 Futures; Sharm El Sheikh, Egypt; Clay $10,000	(Egypt) Sherif Sabry (Egypt) Mohamed Safwat; 4–6, 6–3, [10–6]	(Switzerland) Stefan Fiacan (Slovakia) Filip Horanský	(Poland) Paweł Ciaś (Italy) Stefano Travaglia	(Spain) Juan Samuel Arauzo Martínez (Romania) Cătălin-Ionuț Gârd (Egypt) Mazen Osama (Slovakia) Filip Horanský
March 17	France F7 Futures; Saint-Raphaël, France; Hard (indoor) $10,000	(Slovakia) Karol Beck; 7–6(11–9), 6–4	(Belgium) Maxime Authom	(France) Josselin Ouanna (France) Maxime Teixeira	(France) Tristan Lamasine (France) Grégoire Barrère (Sweden) Markus Eriksson (France) Yannick Jankovits
March 17	France F7 Futures; Saint-Raphaël, France; Hard (indoor) $10,000	(Monaco) Romain Arneodo (Monaco) Benjamin Balleret; 6–2, 7–6^{(7–2)}	(France) Fabrice Martin (France) Hugo Nys	(France) Josselin Ouanna (France) Maxime Teixeira	(France) Tristan Lamasine (France) Grégoire Barrère (Sweden) Markus Eriksson (France) Yannick Jankovits
March 17	Greece F2 Futures; Heraklion, Greece; Hard $10,000	(Czech Republic) Jan Hernych; 7–5, 6–3	(Switzerland) Yann Marti	(Bulgaria) Alexandar Lazov (Bosnia and Herzegovina) Aldin Šetkić	(United Kingdom) Oliver Golding (Czech Republic) Robin Staněk (Belgium) Yannik Reuter (Germany) Kevin Krawietz
March 17	Greece F2 Futures; Heraklion, Greece; Hard $10,000	(Serbia) Nikola Ćaćić (Serbia) Ilija Vučić; 7–6^{(7–1)}, 7–5	(Czech Republic) Jan Hernych (Czech Republic) Robin Staněk	(Bulgaria) Alexandar Lazov (Bosnia and Herzegovina) Aldin Šetkić	(United Kingdom) Oliver Golding (Czech Republic) Robin Staněk (Belgium) Yannik Reuter (Germany) Kevin Krawietz
March 17	India F4 Futures; Tiruchirappalli, India; Clay $10,000	(Spain) Enrique López Pérez; 6–4, 6–4	(India) N. Sriram Balaji	(India) Ramkumar Ramanathan (India) Jeevan Nedunchezhiyan	(France) Mathias Bourgue (Italy) Giorgio Portaluri (Sweden) Lucas Renard (India) Vijayant Malik
March 17	India F4 Futures; Tiruchirappalli, India; Clay $10,000	(India) Arun-Prakash Rajagopalan (India) Ramkumar Ramanathan; 6–3, 4–6, [10–6]	(Italy) Giorgio Portaluri (Sweden) Lucas Renard	(India) Ramkumar Ramanathan (India) Jeevan Nedunchezhiyan	(France) Mathias Bourgue (Italy) Giorgio Portaluri (Sweden) Lucas Renard (India) Vijayant Malik
March 17	Italy F6 Futures; Pula, Italy; Clay $10,000	(Italy) Marco Cecchinato; 6–4, 6–2	(Austria) Dennis Novak	(Spain) Roberto Carballés Baena (Italy) Matteo Marrai	(Italy) Salvatore Caruso (Italy) Riccardo Bellotti (Italy) Gianluca Naso (Netherlands) Thomas Schoorel
March 17	Italy F6 Futures; Pula, Italy; Clay $10,000	(Spain) Roberto Carballés Baena (Spain) David Vega Hernández; 6–4, 6–4	(Italy) Filippo Baldi (Italy) Pietro Licciardi	(Spain) Roberto Carballés Baena (Italy) Matteo Marrai	(Italy) Salvatore Caruso (Italy) Riccardo Bellotti (Italy) Gianluca Naso (Netherlands) Thomas Schoorel
March 17	Japan F2 Futures; Nishitōkyō, Japan; Hard $10,000	(Thailand) Danai Udomchoke; 6–4, 6–2	(Japan) Shuichi Sekiguchi	(Japan) Hiroyasu Ehara (Japan) Yuuya Kibi	(Japan) Takao Suzuki (Japan) Takuto Niki (Japan) Gengo Kikuchi (Japan) Kento Takeuchi
March 17	Japan F2 Futures; Nishitōkyō, Japan; Hard $10,000	(Japan) Sho Katayama (Japan) Bumpei Sato; 6–2, 4–6, [10–6]	(Japan) Yuichi Ito (Japan) Hiroki Kondo	(Japan) Hiroyasu Ehara (Japan) Yuuya Kibi	(Japan) Takao Suzuki (Japan) Takuto Niki (Japan) Gengo Kikuchi (Japan) Kento Takeuchi
March 17	Peru F1 Futures; Lima, Peru; Clay $10,000	(Brazil) Fabiano de Paula; 6–1, 6–1	(Argentina) Federico Coria	(Brazil) Fabrício Neis (Spain) Marc Giner	(Peru) Sergio Monges (Peru) Duilio Beretta (Uruguay) Martín Cuevas (Peru) Mauricio Echazú
March 17	Peru F1 Futures; Lima, Peru; Clay $10,000	(Brazil) Fabrício Neis (Uruguay) Martín Cuevas; 6–7^{(4–7)}, 6–2, [10–2]	(Brazil) Fabiano de Paula (Argentina) Gaston Arturo Grimolizzi	(Brazil) Fabrício Neis (Spain) Marc Giner	(Peru) Sergio Monges (Peru) Duilio Beretta (Uruguay) Martín Cuevas (Peru) Mauricio Echazú
March 17	Turkey F8 Futures; Antalya-Belconti, Turkey; Hard $10,000	(Czech Republic) Jan Mertl; 7–6^{(8–6)}, 4–6, 6–4	(Belgium) Yannick Mertens	(Czech Republic) Jan Šátral (United States) Jared Donaldson	(Bulgaria) Dimitar Kuzmanov (Czech Republic) Michal Konečný (Spain) Jordi Samper Montaña (Germany) Peter Heller
March 17	Turkey F8 Futures; Antalya-Belconti, Turkey; Hard $10,000	(Czech Republic) Roman Jebavý (Czech Republic) Jan Šátral; 6–2, 6–2	(Portugal) Romain Barbosa (Portugal) Frederico Ferreira Silva	(Czech Republic) Jan Šátral (United States) Jared Donaldson	(Bulgaria) Dimitar Kuzmanov (Czech Republic) Michal Konečný (Spain) Jordi Samper Montaña (Germany) Peter Heller
March 17	Ukraine F3 Futures; Cherkasy, Ukraine; Hard (indoor) $10,000	(Ukraine) Artem Smirnov; 6–2, 4–6, 6–2	(Ukraine) Dmytro Badanov	(Ukraine) Marat Deviatiarov (Ukraine) Denys Molchanov	(France) Axel Michon (Ukraine) Dmytro Ishtuganov (Germany) Lukas Rüpke (Canada) Érik Chvojka
March 17	Ukraine F3 Futures; Cherkasy, Ukraine; Hard (indoor) $10,000	(Ukraine) Vladyslav Manafov (Croatia) Filip Veger; 6–2, 6–3	(Ukraine) Marat Deviatiarov (Germany) Pirmin Hänle	(Ukraine) Marat Deviatiarov (Ukraine) Denys Molchanov	(France) Axel Michon (Ukraine) Dmytro Ishtuganov (Germany) Lukas Rüpke (Canada) Érik Chvojka
March 24	Philippines F1 Futures; Manila, Philippines; Hard $15,000	(India) Karunuday Singh; 6–4, 5–7, 6–3	(Japan) Shuichi Sekiguchi	(Australia) Benjamin Mitchell (Philippines) Patrick John Tierro	(Slovakia) Ivo Klec (Australia) Andrew Whittington (Spain) Roberto Ortega Olmedo (Chinese Taipei) Chen Ti
March 24	Philippines F1 Futures; Manila, Philippines; Hard $15,000	(Slovakia) Ivo Klec (India) Karunuday Singh; 6–4, 3–6, [10–8]	(Thailand) Sonchat Ratiwatana (Philippines) Ruben Gonzales	(Australia) Benjamin Mitchell (Philippines) Patrick John Tierro	(Slovakia) Ivo Klec (Australia) Andrew Whittington (Spain) Roberto Ortega Olmedo (Chinese Taipei) Chen Ti
March 24	Switzerland F2 Futures; Trimbach, Switzerland; Carpet (indoor) $15,000	(Germany) Andreas Beck; 7–6^{(7–5)}, 6–4	(France) Albano Olivetti	(France) Maxime Teixeira (Germany) Richard Becker	(Switzerland) Michael Lammer (Poland) Piotr Gadomski (Switzerland) Henri Laaksonen (Germany) Florian Barth
March 24	Switzerland F2 Futures; Trimbach, Switzerland; Carpet (indoor) $15,000	(Switzerland) Henri Laaksonen (Switzerland) Luca Margaroli; 6–2, 6–2	(Russia) Denis Matsukevich (Italy) Matteo Volante	(France) Maxime Teixeira (Germany) Richard Becker	(Switzerland) Michael Lammer (Poland) Piotr Gadomski (Switzerland) Henri Laaksonen (Germany) Florian Barth
March 24	Argentina F6 Futures; Olavarría, Argentina; Clay $10,000	(Argentina) Juan Pablo Paz; 6–4, 6–1	(Argentina) Maximiliano Estévez	(Argentina) Patricio Heras (Bolivia) Hugo Dellien	(Argentina) Francisco Arrechea (Argentina) Pedro Cachin (Argentina) Luciano Doria (Argentina) Tomás Lipovšek Puches
March 24	Argentina F6 Futures; Olavarría, Argentina; Clay $10,000	(Argentina) Dante Gennaro (Japan) Ryūsei Makiguchi; 6–2, 6–3	(Bolivia) Hugo Dellien (Argentina) Maximiliano Estévez	(Argentina) Patricio Heras (Bolivia) Hugo Dellien	(Argentina) Francisco Arrechea (Argentina) Pedro Cachin (Argentina) Luciano Doria (Argentina) Tomás Lipovšek Puches
March 24	Bahrain F1 Futures; Manama, Bahrain; Hard $10,000	(Belgium) Julien Cagnina; 6–2, 6–3	(Germany) Peter Heller	(Spain) Jordi Samper Montaña (France) Maxime Tchoutakian	(United Kingdom) Luke Bambridge (United Kingdom) Liam Broady (France) Antoine Benneteau (France) Thomas Bréchemier
March 24	Bahrain F1 Futures; Manama, Bahrain; Hard $10,000	(Spain) Jaime Pulgar García (Spain) Javier Pulgar García; 6–2, 2–6, [10–6]	(United Kingdom) Liam Broady (United Kingdom) Joshua Ward-Hibbert	(Spain) Jordi Samper Montaña (France) Maxime Tchoutakian	(United Kingdom) Luke Bambridge (United Kingdom) Liam Broady (France) Antoine Benneteau (France) Thomas Bréchemier
March 24	Chile F2 Futures; Concón, Chile; Clay $10,000	(Chile) Hans Podlipnik Castillo; 6–3, 2–6 7–6^{(7–2)}	(Chile) Gonzalo Lama	(Brazil) Carlos Eduardo Severino (Chile) Nicolás Jarry	(Chile) Matías Sborowitz (Chile) Ricardo Urzúa Rivera (Chile) Guillermo Rivera Aránguiz (Brazil) Caio Zampieri
March 24	Chile F2 Futures; Concón, Chile; Clay $10,000	(Chile) Jorge Aguilar (Chile) Hans Podlipnik Castillo; 6–4, 6–7^{(5–7)}, [12–10]	(Brazil) Bruno Sant'Anna (Brazil) Caio Zampieri	(Brazil) Carlos Eduardo Severino (Chile) Nicolás Jarry	(Chile) Matías Sborowitz (Chile) Ricardo Urzúa Rivera (Chile) Guillermo Rivera Aránguiz (Brazil) Caio Zampieri
March 24	Croatia F5 Futures; Umag, Croatia; Clay $10,000	(Morocco) Lamine Ouahab; 6–0, 6–7^{(6–7)}, 6–3	(Italy) Simone Vagnozzi	(Croatia) Kristijan Mesaroš (Belarus) Uladzimir Ignatik	(France) Tak Khunn Wang (Croatia) Antonio Šančić (Spain) Juan Lizariturry (Croatia) Mate Delić
March 24	Croatia F5 Futures; Umag, Croatia; Clay $10,000	(Belarus) Egor Gerasimov (Belarus) Dzmitry Zhyrmont; 6–4, 4–6, [10–6]	(Croatia) Antonio Šančić (Croatia) Dino Marcan	(Croatia) Kristijan Mesaroš (Belarus) Uladzimir Ignatik	(France) Tak Khunn Wang (Croatia) Antonio Šančić (Spain) Juan Lizariturry (Croatia) Mate Delić
March 24	Egypt F11 Futures; Sharm El Sheikh, Egypt; Clay $10,000	(Czech Republic) Jaroslav Pospíšil; 6–2, 6–2	(Spain) José Checa Calvo	(France) Guillaume Rufin (Poland) Andriej Kapaś	(Czech Republic) Jan Blecha (Portugal) João Domingues (Portugal) Vasco Mensurado (Spain) Sergio Castellon Guasch
March 24	Egypt F11 Futures; Sharm El Sheikh, Egypt; Clay $10,000	(Poland) Marcin Gawron (Poland) Andriej Kapaś; 4–6, 6–4, [10–2]	(Egypt) Mazen Osama (Syria) Issam Haitham Taweel	(France) Guillaume Rufin (Poland) Andriej Kapaś	(Czech Republic) Jan Blecha (Portugal) João Domingues (Portugal) Vasco Mensurado (Spain) Sergio Castellon Guasch
March 24	Greece F3 Futures; Heraklion, Greece; Hard $10,000	(France) Martin Vaïsse; 6–4, 6–4	(United Kingdom) Alexander Ward	(Serbia) Dejan Katić (Bosnia and Herzegovina) Aldin Šetkić	(Czech Republic) Jan Hernych (Slovakia) Jozef Kovalík (France) Jules Marie (Spain) Iván Arenas Gualda
March 24	Greece F3 Futures; Heraklion, Greece; Hard $10,000	(Slovakia) Jozef Kovalík (Bosnia and Herzegovina) Aldin Šetkić; 6–3, 6–4	(Czech Republic) Lukáš Maršoun (Czech Republic) Dominik Süč	(Serbia) Dejan Katić (Bosnia and Herzegovina) Aldin Šetkić	(Czech Republic) Jan Hernych (Slovakia) Jozef Kovalík (France) Jules Marie (Spain) Iván Arenas Gualda
March 24	India F5 Futures; Madurai, India; Clay $10,000	(Spain) Enrique López Pérez; 6–2, 6–0	(Sweden) Lucas Renard	(France) Mathias Bourgue (India) Vinayak Sharma Kaza	(Spain) Pol Toledo Bagué (India) Ranjeet Virali-Murugesan (Italy) Giorgio Portaluri (India) N. Sriram Balaji
March 24	India F5 Futures; Madurai, India; Clay $10,000	(Italy) Giorgio Portaluri (Sweden) Lucas Renard; 6–4, 6–2	(India) N. Sriram Balaji (India) Ranjeet Virali-Murugesan	(France) Mathias Bourgue (India) Vinayak Sharma Kaza	(Spain) Pol Toledo Bagué (India) Ranjeet Virali-Murugesan (Italy) Giorgio Portaluri (India) N. Sriram Balaji
March 24	Italy F7 Futures; Santa Margherita di Pula, Italy; Clay $10,000	(Italy) Marco Cecchinato; 6–4, 6–1	(Spain) Roberto Carballés Baena	(Italy) Alberto Brizzi (Italy) Edoardo Eremin	(France) Enzo Py (Italy) Pietro Rondoni (Austria) Gibril Diarra (Italy) Emanuele Molina
March 24	Italy F7 Futures; Santa Margherita di Pula, Italy; Clay $10,000	(Italy) Filippo Baldi (Italy) Salvatore Caruso; 6–3, 6–2	(Italy) Francesco Borgo (Italy) Marco Speronello	(Italy) Alberto Brizzi (Italy) Edoardo Eremin	(France) Enzo Py (Italy) Pietro Rondoni (Austria) Gibril Diarra (Italy) Emanuele Molina
March 24	Japan F3 Futures; Kōfu, Japan; Hard $10,000	(Japan) Takuto Niki; 6–4, 6–2	(Japan) Yusuke Watanuki	(Japan) Hiroyasu Ehara (Japan) Yuuya Kibi	(Japan) Bumpei Sato (Japan) Toshihide Matsui (Japan) Kento Takeuchi (Japan) Yuichi Ito
March 24	Japan F3 Futures; Kōfu, Japan; Hard $10,000	(Japan) Takuto Niki (Japan) Arata Onozawa; 6–4, 6–2	(Japan) Toshihide Matsui (Thailand) Danai Udomchoke	(Japan) Hiroyasu Ehara (Japan) Yuuya Kibi	(Japan) Bumpei Sato (Japan) Toshihide Matsui (Japan) Kento Takeuchi (Japan) Yuichi Ito
March 24	Peru F2 Futures; Lima, Peru; Clay $10,000	(Spain) Marcos Giraldi Requena; 6–1, 6–0	(Argentina) Federico Coria	(Ecuador) Gonzalo Escobar (Brazil) Ricardo Hocevar	(Peru) Mauricio Echazú (Spain) Marc Giner (Peru) Duilio Beretta (Venezuela) Luis David Martínez
March 24	Peru F2 Futures; Lima, Peru; Clay $10,000	(Argentina) Federico Coria (Spain) Marc Giner; 6–2, 3–6, [10–5]	(Bolivia) Alejandro Mendoza (Peru) Duilio Vallebuona	(Ecuador) Gonzalo Escobar (Brazil) Ricardo Hocevar	(Peru) Mauricio Echazú (Spain) Marc Giner (Peru) Duilio Beretta (Venezuela) Luis David Martínez
March 24	Turkey F9 Futures; Antalya-Belconti, Turkey; Hard $10,000	(Brazil) Wilson Leite; 7–5, 6–2	(Portugal) Frederico Ferreira Silva	(Russia) Richard Muzaev (Czech Republic) Roman Jebavý	(Portugal) Frederico Gil (United Kingdom) Tom Farquharson (United Kingdom) James Marsalek (Bulgaria) Dimitar Kuzmanov
March 24	Turkey F9 Futures; Antalya-Belconti, Turkey; Hard $10,000	(Czech Republic) Roman Jebavý (Czech Republic) Jan Šátral; 6–3, 6–4	(Russia) Anton Manegin (Russia) Aleksandr Vasilenko	(Russia) Richard Muzaev (Czech Republic) Roman Jebavý	(Portugal) Frederico Gil (United Kingdom) Tom Farquharson (United Kingdom) James Marsalek (Bulgaria) Dimitar Kuzmanov
March 31	Algeria F1 Futures; Oran, Algeria; Clay $15,000	(Serbia) Peđa Krstin; 7–6^{(7–5)}, 6–1	(France) Jordan Ubiergo	(France) Laurent Recouderc (Belgium) Yannik Reuter	(Belgium) Germain Gigounon (Italy) Omar Giacalone (Belgium) Julien Dubail (Italy) Matteo Marrai
March 31	Algeria F1 Futures; Oran, Algeria; Clay $15,000	(Italy) Omar Giacalone (Italy) Matteo Marrai; 7–5, 4–6, [10–5]	(Belgium) Germain Gigounon (Belgium) Yannik Reuter	(France) Laurent Recouderc (Belgium) Yannik Reuter	(Belgium) Germain Gigounon (Italy) Omar Giacalone (Belgium) Julien Dubail (Italy) Matteo Marrai
March 31	Australia F4 Futures; Melbourne, Australia; Clay $15,000	(Australia) Alex Bolt; 6–3, 6–2	(Australia) Blake Mott	(Australia) Maverick Banes (Australia) Matthew Barton	(Australia) Matt Reid (Australia) Daniel Byrnes (Australia) Jordan Thompson (Australia) Simon Ede
March 31	Australia F4 Futures; Melbourne, Australia; Clay $15,000	(Australia) Bradley Mousley (Australia) Jordan Thompson; Walkover	(Australia) Adam Hubble (Australia) Matt Reid	(Australia) Maverick Banes (Australia) Matthew Barton	(Australia) Matt Reid (Australia) Daniel Byrnes (Australia) Jordan Thompson (Australia) Simon Ede
March 31	Malaysia F1 Futures; Kuching, Malaysia; Hard $15,000	(Spain) Roberto Ortega Olmedo; 6–0, 6–2	(Spain) Carlos Boluda Purkiss	(Australia) Benjamin Mitchell (Slovakia) Ivo Klec	(Thailand) Sanchai Ratiwatana (Chinese Taipei) Hung Jui-chen (India) Karunuday Singh (Japan) Shuichi Sekiguchi
March 31	Malaysia F1 Futures; Kuching, Malaysia; Hard $15,000	(Thailand) Sanchai Ratiwatana (Thailand) Sonchat Ratiwatana; 6–2, 6–4	(Chinese Taipei) Ho Chih-jen (Chinese Taipei) Hung Jui-chen	(Australia) Benjamin Mitchell (Slovakia) Ivo Klec	(Thailand) Sanchai Ratiwatana (Chinese Taipei) Hung Jui-chen (India) Karunuday Singh (Japan) Shuichi Sekiguchi
March 31	USA F10 Futures; Harlingen, United States; Hard $15,000	(Serbia) Filip Krajinović; 6–2, 6–4	(United Kingdom) Daniel Smethurst	(United States) Ernesto Escobedo (United Kingdom) Daniel Manlow	(United States) Jean-Yves Aubone (Mexico) Hans Hach Verdugo (United States) Connor Smith (United States) Jared Donaldson
March 31	USA F10 Futures; Harlingen, United States; Hard $15,000	(United States) Evan King (United States) Devin McCarthy; 6–3, 7–6^{7–2}	(United Kingdom) Edward Corrie (United Kingdom) Daniel Smethurst	(United States) Ernesto Escobedo (United Kingdom) Daniel Manlow	(United States) Jean-Yves Aubone (Mexico) Hans Hach Verdugo (United States) Connor Smith (United States) Jared Donaldson
March 31	Chile F3 Futures; Villa Alemana, Chile; Clay $10,000	(Brazil) Caio Zampieri; 6–1, 6–2	(Chile) Matías Sborowitz	(Venezuela) Jordi Muñoz Abreu (Chile) Cristóbal Saavedra Corvalán	(Chile) Bastián Malla (Argentina) Eduardo Agustín Torre (Chile) Guillermo Rivera Aránguiz (Chile) Guillermo Núñez
March 31	Chile F3 Futures; Villa Alemana, Chile; Clay $10,000	(Chile) Guillermo Rivera Aránguiz (Chile) Cristóbal Saavedra Corvalán; 6–4, 4–6, [10–6]	(Chile) Nicolás Jarry (Chile) Guillermo Núñez	(Venezuela) Jordi Muñoz Abreu (Chile) Cristóbal Saavedra Corvalán	(Chile) Bastián Malla (Argentina) Eduardo Agustín Torre (Chile) Guillermo Rivera Aránguiz (Chile) Guillermo Núñez
March 31	Croatia F6 Futures; Rovinj, Croatia; Clay $10,000	(Spain) Oriol Roca Batalla; 6–3, 2–6, 6–3	(Croatia) Dino Marcan	(Austria) Marc Rath (Spain) Gerard Granollers	(Croatia) Joško Topić (Spain) Íñigo Cervantes Huegun (Serbia) Laslo Djere (Croatia) Duje Kekez
March 31	Croatia F6 Futures; Rovinj, Croatia; Clay $10,000	(Croatia) Dino Marcan (Croatia) Antonio Šančić; 7–6^{(7–5)}, 7–5	(Croatia) Tomislav Draganja (Croatia) Joško Topić	(Austria) Marc Rath (Spain) Gerard Granollers	(Croatia) Joško Topić (Spain) Íñigo Cervantes Huegun (Serbia) Laslo Djere (Croatia) Duje Kekez
March 31	Egypt F12 Futures; Sharm El Sheikh, Egypt; Clay $10,000	(Sweden) Elias Ymer; 6–2, 6–3	(Serbia) Marko Tepavac	(Portugal) Vasco Mensurado (Spain) Juan Samuel Arauzo Martínez	(Syria) Issam Haitham Taweel (Portugal) João Domingues (Czech Republic) Jan Blecha (Czech Republic) Libor Salaba
March 31	Egypt F12 Futures; Sharm El Sheikh, Egypt; Clay $10,000	(Poland) Andriej Kapaś (Poland) Błażej Koniusz; 6–2, 7–6^{(7–1)}	(Germany) Steven Moneke (Netherlands) Mark Vervoort	(Portugal) Vasco Mensurado (Spain) Juan Samuel Arauzo Martínez	(Syria) Issam Haitham Taweel (Portugal) João Domingues (Czech Republic) Jan Blecha (Czech Republic) Libor Salaba
March 31	Greece F4 Futures; Heraklion, Greece; Hard $10,000	(Slovakia) Jozef Kovalík; 6–0, 6–2	(Serbia) Dejan Katić	(Bosnia and Herzegovina) Aldin Šetkić (Germany) Moritz Baumann	(Japan) Shotaro Goto (Spain) Iván Arenas Gualda (Italy) Federico Gaio (Spain) Carlos Gómez Herrera
March 31	Greece F4 Futures; Heraklion, Greece; Hard $10,000	(Slovenia) Tom Kočevar-Dešman (Germany) Torsten Wietoska; 7–6^{(7–4)}, 6–4	(Czech Republic) Marek Jaloviec (Czech Republic) Václav Šafránek	(Bosnia and Herzegovina) Aldin Šetkić (Germany) Moritz Baumann	(Japan) Shotaro Goto (Spain) Iván Arenas Gualda (Italy) Federico Gaio (Spain) Carlos Gómez Herrera
March 31	Italy F8 Futures; Santa Margherita di Pula, Italy; Clay $10,000	(Croatia) Viktor Galović; 7–6^{7–5}, 4–6, 6–3	(Italy) Alberto Brizzi	(Germany) Yannick Maden (Italy) Filippo Leonardi	(Italy) Enrico Burzi (Spain) David Vega Hernández (Italy) Francesco Picco (Italy) Gianluca Mager
March 31	Italy F8 Futures; Santa Margherita di Pula, Italy; Clay $10,000	(Spain) Jaume Pla Malfeito (Spain) David Vega Hernández; 6–4, 2–6, [10–4]	(Italy) Matteo Fago (Italy) Manuel Mazzella	(Germany) Yannick Maden (Italy) Filippo Leonardi	(Italy) Enrico Burzi (Spain) David Vega Hernández (Italy) Francesco Picco (Italy) Gianluca Mager
March 31	Japan F4 Futures; Tsukuba, Japan; Hard $10,000	(Japan) Masato Shiga; 3–6, 7–6^{(7–4)}, 6–3	(Japan) Takuto Niki	(Japan) Yuuya Kibi (South Korea) Lee Duck-hee	(Japan) Issei Okamura (Japan) Shunrou Takeshima (Japan) Kaito Uesugi (Japan) Junya Toyono
March 31	Japan F4 Futures; Tsukuba, Japan; Hard $10,000	(Japan) Sho Katayama (Japan) Bumpei Sato; 6–4, 6–4	(South Korea) Lee Duck-hee (New Zealand) Finn Tearney	(Japan) Yuuya Kibi (South Korea) Lee Duck-hee	(Japan) Issei Okamura (Japan) Shunrou Takeshima (Japan) Kaito Uesugi (Japan) Junya Toyono
March 31	Kazakhstan F4 Futures; Shymkent, Kazakhstan; Clay $10,000	(Bulgaria) Alexandar Lazov; 6–3, 6–7^{(2–7)}, 6–2	(Ukraine) Dmytro Badanov	(Serbia) Denis Bejtulahi (Russia) Andrei Plotniy	(Belarus) Andrei Vasilevski (Russia) Ivan Nedelko (Georgia (country)) Aleksandre Metreveli (Kazakhstan) Timur Khabibulin
March 31	Kazakhstan F4 Futures; Shymkent, Kazakhstan; Clay $10,000	(Russia) Kirill Dmitriev (Russia) Andrei Plotniy; 4–6, 6–4, [14–12]	(Belarus) Yaraslav Shyla (Belarus) Andrei Vasilevski	(Serbia) Denis Bejtulahi (Russia) Andrei Plotniy	(Belarus) Andrei Vasilevski (Russia) Ivan Nedelko (Georgia (country)) Aleksandre Metreveli (Kazakhstan) Timur Khabibulin
March 31	Peru F3 Futures; Lima, Peru; Clay $10,000	(Portugal) Rui Machado; 6–1, 6–2	(Peru) Jorge Panta	(Spain) Marc Giner (Argentina) Federico Coria	(Brazil) Fabrício Neis (Argentina) Gaston Arturo Grimolizzi (Brazil) Fabiano de Paula (Brazil) Ricardo Hocevar
March 31	Peru F3 Futures; Lima, Peru; Clay $10,000	(Brazil) Fabiano de Paula (Argentina) Gaston Arturo Grimolizzi; 2–6, 6–4, [10–5]	(Argentina) Federico Coria (Spain) Marc Giner	(Spain) Marc Giner (Argentina) Federico Coria	(Brazil) Fabrício Neis (Argentina) Gaston Arturo Grimolizzi (Brazil) Fabiano de Paula (Brazil) Ricardo Hocevar
March 31	Qatar F1 Futures; Doha, Qatar; Hard $10,000	(United Kingdom) Daniel Cox; 6–3, 6–4	(Belgium) Yannick Mertens	(Slovakia) Marek Semjan (Chinese Taipei) Chen Ti	(United Kingdom) Liam Broady (Belgium) Sander Gillé (United States) Michael Mmoh (France) Antoine Benneteau
March 31	Qatar F1 Futures; Doha, Qatar; Hard $10,000	(United Kingdom) Liam Broady (United Kingdom) Joshua Ward-Hibbert; 6–3, 7–5	(Italy) Lorenzo Frigerio (Italy) Luca Vanni	(Slovakia) Marek Semjan (Chinese Taipei) Chen Ti	(United Kingdom) Liam Broady (Belgium) Sander Gillé (United States) Michael Mmoh (France) Antoine Benneteau
March 31	Turkey F10 Futures; Antalya-Belconti, Turkey; Hard $10,000	(Slovakia) Karol Beck; 7–6^{(7–5)}, 3–6, 6–3	(Croatia) Mate Delić	(France) Julien Obry (Czech Republic) Roman Jebavý	(Czech Republic) Jan Šátral (Croatia) Franjo Raspudić (Brazil) Wilson Leite (Spain) Ricardo Ojeda Lara
March 31	Turkey F10 Futures; Antalya-Belconti, Turkey; Hard $10,000	(Slovakia) Karol Beck (Austria) Maximilian Neuchrist; 6–2, 6–3	(United Kingdom) George Coupland (Germany) Andreas Mies	(France) Julien Obry (Czech Republic) Roman Jebavý	(Czech Republic) Jan Šátral (Croatia) Franjo Raspudić (Brazil) Wilson Leite (Spain) Ricardo Ojeda Lara
