= 2008 Open Sabadell Atlántico Barcelona – Doubles =

Doubles
- 2008 Open Sabadell Atlántico Barcelona

Final
- Champions: (United States) Bob Bryan (United States) Mike Bryan
- Runners-up: (Poland) Mariusz Fyrstenberg (Poland) Marcin Matkowski
- Score: 6–3, 6–2

Events
Singles	Doubles
← 2007 ·	Open Sabadell Atlántico Barcelona	· 2009 →

Andrei Pavel and Alexander Waske were the defending champions, but chose not to participate that year.

Bob Bryan and Mike Bryan won in the final 6–3, 6–2, against Mariusz Fyrstenberg and Marcin Matkowski.

== Seeds ==
All seeds receive a bye into the second round.

1. (United States) Bob Bryan / (United States) Mike Bryan (champions)
2. (Canada) Daniel Nestor / (Serbia) Nenad Zimonjić (second round)
3. (Israel) Jonathan Erlich / (Israel) Andy Ram (second round)
4. (Sweden) Simon Aspelin / (Austria) Julian Knowle (semifinals)
5. (South Africa) Jeff Coetzee / (Zimbabwe) Kevin Ullyett (quarterfinals)
6. (Australia) Paul Hanley / (India) Leander Paes (second round)
7. (Poland) Mariusz Fyrstenberg / (Poland) Marcin Matkowski (final)
8. (Belarus) Max Mirnyi / (United Kingdom) Jamie Murray (second round)

== Draw ==
=== Key ===
- Q = Qualifier
- WC = Wild card
- LL = Lucky loser
- Alt = Alternate
- SE = Special exempt
- PR = Protected ranking
- ITF = ITF entry
- JE = Junior exempt
- w/o = Walkover
- r = Retired
- d = Defaulted
- SR = Special ranking

=== Finals ===
Semifinals
1	(United States) Bob Bryan (United States) Mike Bryan	2	7	[10]
(Spain) Feliciano López (Spain) Fernando Verdasco	6	6^{5}	[4]
4	(Sweden) Simon Aspelin (Austria) Julian Knowle	1	6^{5}
7	(Poland) Mariusz Fyrstenberg (Poland) Marcin Matkowski	6	7

Final
1	(United States) Bob Bryan (United States) Mike Bryan	6	6
7	(Poland) Mariusz Fyrstenberg (Poland) Marcin Matkowski	3	2

=== Top half ===
First round
(Argentina) A Calleri (Italy) P Starace	4	6	[16]
(Thailand) S Ratiwatana (Thailand) S Ratiwatana	6	3	[14]
(Argentina) JI Chela (Uruguay) P Cuevas	2	6	[10]
WC	(Spain) G Alcaide (Spain) A Montañés	6	1	[2]
(Brazil) M Melo (Brazil) A Sá	6	2	[6]
(Argentina) L Arnold Ker (Argentina) D Nalbandian	3	6	[10]
(Spain) F López (Spain) F Verdasco	6	3	[10]
(Spain) N Almagro (Spain) M Granollers	2	6	[5]

Second round
1	(United States) B Bryan (United States) M Bryan	5	6	[12]
(Argentina) A Calleri (Italy) P Starace	7	2	[10]
(Argentina) JI Chela (Uruguay) P Cuevas	6	6
6	(Australia) P Hanley (India) L Paes	4	1
3	(Israel) J Erlich (Israel) A Ram	6^{5}	1
(Argentina) L Arnold Ker (Argentina) D Nalbandian	7	6
(Spain) F López (Spain) F Verdasco	6	6
8	(Belarus) M Mirnyi (United Kingdom) J Murray	4	2

Quarterfinals
1	(United States) B Bryan (United States) M Bryan	6	6
(Argentina) JI Chela (Uruguay) P Cuevas	1	2
(Argentina) L Arnold Ker (Argentina) D Nalbandian	5	2
(Spain) F López (Spain) F Verdasco	7	6

Semifinals
1	(United States) B Bryan (United States) M Bryan	2	7	[10]
(Spain) F López (Spain) F Verdasco	6	6^{5}	[4]

=== Bottom half ===
First round
(United Kingdom) R Hutchins (United Kingdom) A Murray	6	2	[10]
(Sweden) T Johansson (Sweden) R Lindstedt	4	6	[3]
(Argentina) J Acasuso (Argentina) S Prieto	2	6	[9]
WC	(Spain) M López (Spain) A Martín	6	0	[11]
(Spain) T Robredo (Spain) S Ventura	0	1
(Austria) O Marach (Slovakia) M Mertiňák	6	6
ALT	(Croatia) M Ančić (Germany) M Zverev	6	6
(Netherlands) R Haase (Croatia) I Karlović	2	3

Second round
5	(South Africa) J Coetzee (Zimbabwe) K Ullyett	6	7
(United Kingdom) R Hutchins (United Kingdom) A Murray	3	6^{2}
WC	(Spain) M López (Spain) A Martín
4	(Sweden) S Aspelin (Austria) J Knowle	w/o
7	(Poland) M Fyrstenberg (Poland) M Matkowski	4	6	[10]
(Austria) O Marach (Slovakia) M Mertiňák	6	4	[5]
ALT	(Croatia) M Ančić (Germany) M Zverev	6	3	[11]
2	(Canada) D Nestor (Serbia) N Zimonjić	4	6	[9]

Quarterfinals
5	(South Africa) J Coetzee (Zimbabwe) K Ullyett	3	7	[4]
4	(Sweden) S Aspelin (Austria) J Knowle	6	6^{2}	[10]
7	(Poland) M Fyrstenberg (Poland) M Matkowski	7	6^{5}	[10]
ALT	(Croatia) M Ančić (Germany) M Zverev	6^{5}	7	[7]

Semifinals
4	(Sweden) S Aspelin (Austria) J Knowle	1	6^{5}
7	(Poland) M Fyrstenberg (Poland) M Matkowski	6	7
