= 2011 Aguascalientes Open =

- Date: 26 September–2 October
- Edition: 1st
- Location: Aguascalientes, Mexico

Champions

Singles
- (Colombia) Juan Sebastián Cabal

Doubles
- (Mexico) Daniel Garza / (Mexico) Santiago González
Aguascalientes Open	· 2012 →

The 2011 Aguascalientes Open was a professional tennis tournament played on clay courts. It was the first edition of the tournament which was part of the 2011 ATP Challenger Tour. It took place in Aguascalientes, Mexico between 26 September and 2 October 2011.

== ATP entrants ==
=== Seeds ===
Country	Player	Rank^{1}	Seed
ARG	Horacio Zeballos	105	1
ARG	Máximo González	110	2
COL	Carlos Salamanca	173	3
ARG	Facundo Bagnis	186	4
ARG	Eduardo Schwank	222	5
DOM	Víctor Estrella	230	6
MDA	Roman Borvanov	231	7
COL	Juan Sebastián Cabal	239	8

- ^{1} Rankings are as of September 19, 2011.

=== Other entrants ===
The following players received wildcards into the singles main draw:

- (Mexico) José Enrique Hernández
- (Mexico) Eduardo Magadan-Castro
- (Mexico) Marco Aurei Núñez
- (Mexico) Carlos Velasco

The following players received entry from the qualifying draw:

- (Barbados) Haydn Lewis
- (Mexico) César Ramírez
- (Australia) Nima Roshan
- (Mexico) Manuel Sánchez

== Champions ==
=== Singles ===
(Colombia) Juan Sebastián Cabal def. (Colombia) Robert Farah, 6–4, 7–6^{(7–3)}

=== Doubles ===
(Mexico) Daniel Garza / (Mexico) Santiago González def. (Ecuador) Júlio César Campozano / (Dominican Republic) Víctor Estrella, 6–4, 5–7, [11–9]
