= 2008 Open Sabadell Atlántico Barcelona =

- Date: April 28 – May 4
- Edition: 56th
- Category: International Series Gold
- Draw: 56S / 28D
- Prize money: $945,000
- Surface: Clay / Outdoor
- Location: Barcelona, Spain
- Venue: Real Club de Tenis Barcelona

Champions

Singles
- (Spain) Rafael Nadal

Doubles
- (United States) Bob Bryan / (United States) Mike Bryan
| ← 2007 · | Open Sabadell Atlántico Barcelona | · 2009 → |

The 2008 Open Sabadell Atlántico Barcelona (also known traditionally as the Torneo Godó) was a tennis tournament played on outdoor clay courts. It was the 56th edition of the Torneo Godó, and was part of the International Series Gold of the 2008 ATP Tour. It took place at the Real Club de Tenis Barcelona in Barcelona, Catalonia, Spain, from April 28 through May 4, 2008.

The singles draw featured ATP No. 2, Monte-Carlo Masters singles and doubles titlist, three-time Barcelona defending champion Rafael Nadal, Australian Open quarterfinalist and Valencia winner David Ferrer, and Acapulco finalist and Buenos Aires champion David Nalbandian. Among other players were Delray Beach and Houston runner-up James Blake, Costa do Sauípe finalist Carlos Moyá, Tommy Robredo, Andy Murray and Ivo Karlović.

The event also featured a seniors' tournament that was part of the ATP Champions Tour, which was held from April 24 to 28. Marcelo Ríos won the title.

== Champions ==
=== Singles ===
(Spain) Rafael Nadal defeated (Spain) David Ferrer 6–1, 4–6, 6–1

- It was Rafael Nadal's 2nd title of the year, and his 25th overall. It was his 4th consecutive win at the event.

=== Doubles ===
(United States) Bob Bryan / (United States) Mike Bryan defeated (Poland) Mariusz Fyrstenberg / (Poland) Marcin Matkowski 6–3, 6–2

=== Seniors ===
(Chile) Marcelo Ríos defeated (Germany) Michael Stich 6–3, 6–3
