= Aguascalientes Open =

Tennis tournament

Tournament information
- Location: Aguascalientes; Mexico
- Category: ATP Challenger Tour
- Surface: Clay / Outdoors
- Draw: 32S/32Q/16D
- Prize money: €50,000+H

The Aguascalientes Open is a tennis tournament held in Aguascalientes, Mexico since 2011. The event is part of the ATP Challenger Tour and is played on outdoor clay courts.

== Past finals ==
=== Singles ===
Year	Champion	Runner-up	Score
2011	(Colombia) Juan Sebastián Cabal	(Colombia) Robert Farah	6–4, 7–6^{(7–3)}

=== Doubles ===
Year	Champions	Runners-up	Score
2011	(Mexico) Daniel Garza (Mexico) Santiago González	(Ecuador) Júlio César Campozano (Dominican Republic) Víctor Estrella	6–4, 5–7, [11–9]
