= Matteo Marrai =

Italian tennis player

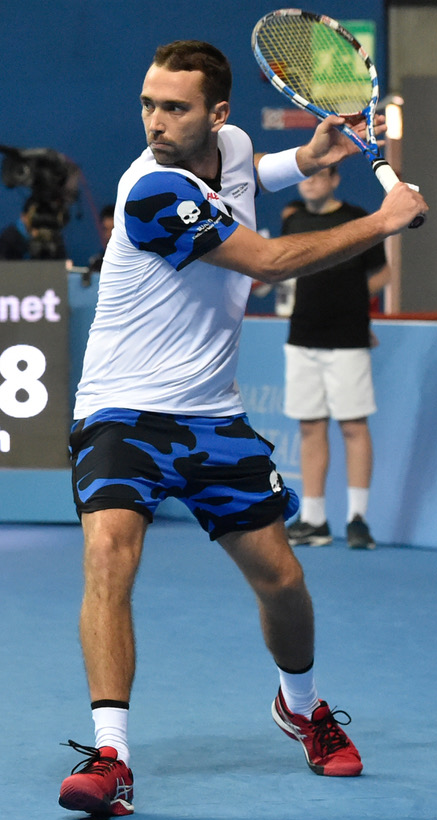
- Full name: Matteo Marrai
- Country (sports): Italy
- Born: 17 November 1986 (age 38); Pisa, Italy
- Prize money: $103,160

Singles
- Career record: 0–1
- Career titles: 0
- Highest ranking: No. 263 (7 May 2012)

Doubles
- Highest ranking: No. 344 (12 January 2009)
Medal record
Men's tennis
Representing Italy
Mediterranean Games
Gold medal – first place	2009 Pescara	Men's Doubles

Matteo Marrai (born 17 November 1986) is a former professional tennis player from Italy.

== Biography ==
Marrai was born in Pisa and started playing tennis aged six. He played mostly on the Futures circuit, where he won a total of 21 titles. His only appearance in the main draw of an ATP Tour tournament came at the 2008 Open Sabadell Atlántico Barcelona as a qualifier. After beating Mikhail Ledovskikh and Andrey Golubev in qualifying, he lost in first round to Barcelona local Alberto Martín. He took part in the qualifying competition at the 2009 Australian Open and was eliminated in the opening round. At the 2009 Mediterranean Games, Marrai lost the bronze medal match to Gianluca Naso, but teamed up with Naso to win gold in men's doubles over a pair from Montenegro. He retired from tennis in 2014.
