= 2011 Aegon GB Pro-Series Bath – Men's singles =

Men's singles
- 2011 Aegon GB Pro-Series Bath

Final
- Champion: (Russia) Dmitry Tursunov
- Runner-up: (Germany) Andreas Beck
- Score: 6–4, 6–4

Events
Singles	men	women
Doubles	men	women
Aegon GB Pro-Series Bath	· 2012 →

Dmitry Tursunov claimed the title, defeating Andreas Beck 6–4, 6–4 in the final.

== Seeds ==
1. (France) Nicolas Mahut (quarterfinals)
2. (Germany) Dustin Brown (second round)
3. (Russia) Dmitry Tursunov (champion)
4. (Luxembourg) Gilles Müller (first round)
5. (France) Édouard Roger-Vasselin (first round)
6. (Germany) Andreas Beck (final)
7. (Slovakia) Karol Beck (second round)
8. (Republic of Ireland) Conor Niland (first round)

== Draw ==
=== Key ===
- Q = Qualifier
- WC = Wild card
- LL = Lucky loser
- Alt = Alternate
- SE = Special exempt
- PR = Protected ranking
- ITF = ITF entry
- JE = Junior exempt
- w/o = Walkover
- r = Retired
- d = Defaulted
- SR = Special ranking

=== Finals ===
Semifinals
6	(Germany) Andreas Beck	2	6	6
(Estonia) Jürgen Zopp	6	4	1
3	(Russia) Dmitry Tursunov	6	6
WC	(United Kingdom) Daniel Evans	3	2

Final
6	(Germany) Andreas Beck	4	4
3	(Russia) Dmitry Tursunov	6	6

=== Top half ===
First round
1	(France) N Mahut	7	7
(Czech Republic) J Hernych	5	5
Q	(United Kingdom) A Ward	6	7
Q	(Switzerland) M Lammer	3	5
(Slovakia) P Červenák	6	4	6
(France) G Burquier	1	6	3
(Israel) A Weintraub	4	5
6	(Germany) A Beck	6	7
4	(Luxembourg) G Müller	4	1^{r}
(France) R Jouan	6	1
(Estonia) J Zopp	6	6
(France) C Reix	4	3
Q	(Sweden) E Eleskovic	6	3	7
(Australia) J Millman	4	6	6^{0}
(Spain) R Bautista Agut	6	3	4
7	(Slovakia) K Beck	1	6	6

Second round
1	(France) N Mahut	7	6
Q	(United Kingdom) A Ward	6^{3}	1
(Slovakia) P Červenák	3	4
6	(Germany) A Beck	6	6
(France) R Jouan	4	4
(Estonia) J Zopp	6	6
Q	(Sweden) E Eleskovic	6	0
7	(Slovakia) K Beck	2	0^{r}

Quarterfinals
1	(France) N Mahut	4	6	3
6	(Germany) A Beck	6	4	6
(Estonia) J Zopp	6	6
Q	(Sweden) E Eleskovic	4	4

Semifinals
6	(Germany) A Beck	2	6	6
(Estonia) J Zopp	6	4	1

=== Bottom half ===
First round
5	(France) É Roger-Vasselin	2	3
(Belgium) Y Mertens	6	6
(Slovakia) A Martin	6	6
(Australia) B Klein	2	3
WC	(United Kingdom) J Milton	3	4
WC	(United Kingdom) D Cox	6	6
(Belgium) R Bemelmans	6	4	6^{7}
3	(Russia) D Tursunov	4	6	7
8	(Republic of Ireland) C Niland	4	4
WC	(United Kingdom) D Evans	6	6
(France) L Walter	6	7
WC	(United Kingdom) D Smethurst	3	6^{4}
Q	(Slovakia) M Mečíř Jr.	0^{r}
(Denmark) F Nielsen	1
(Poland) J Janowicz	3	3
2	(Germany) D Brown	6	6

Second round
(Belgium) Y Mertens	4	6^{2}
(Slovakia) A Martin	6	7
WC	(United Kingdom) D Cox	3	4
3	(Russia) D Tursunov	6	6
WC	(United Kingdom) D Evans	6	3	6
(France) L Walter	4	6	2
(Denmark) F Nielsen	4	7	6
2	(Germany) D Brown	6	6^{5}	4

Quarterfinals
(Slovakia) A Martin	7	3	2
3	(Russia) D Tursunov	5	6	6
WC	(United Kingdom) D Evans	6	1	6
(Denmark) F Nielsen	4	6	3

Semifinals
3	(Russia) D Tursunov	6	6
WC	(United Kingdom) D Evans	3	2
