= 2011 Aegon GB Pro-Series Bath – Men's doubles =

Men's doubles
- 2011 Aegon GB Pro-Series Bath

Final
- Champions: (United Kingdom) Jamie Delgado (United Kingdom) Jonathan Marray
- Runners-up: (Switzerland) Yves Allegro (Germany) Andreas Beck
- Score: 6–3, 6–4

Events
Singles	men	women
Doubles	men	women
Aegon GB Pro-Series Bath	· 2012 →

Jamie Delgado and Jonathan Marray defeated Yves Allegro and Andreas Beck in the final 6–3, 6–4.

== Seeds ==
1. (Germany) Dustin Brown / (Germany) Philipp Marx (first round)
2. (Sweden) Johan Brunström / (Denmark) Frederik Nielsen (first round)
3. (France) Nicolas Mahut / (France) Édouard Roger-Vasselin (quarterfinals)
4. (United Kingdom) Jamie Delgado / (United Kingdom) Jonathan Marray (champions)

== Draw ==
=== Key ===
- Q = Qualifier
- WC = Wild card
- LL = Lucky loser
- Alt = Alternate
- SE = Special exempt
- PR = Protected ranking
- ITF = ITF entry
- JE = Junior exempt
- w/o = Walkover
- r = Retired
- d = Defaulted
- SR = Special ranking

=== Draw ===
First round
1	(Germany) D Brown (Germany) P Marx	7	6^{6}	[6]
(Switzerland) M Lammer (Slovakia) M Mečíř Jr.	5	7	[10]
(Slovakia) A Martin (Estonia) J Zopp	6	6
(Australia) B Klein (Australia) J Millman	3	2
4	(United Kingdom) J Delgado (United Kingdom) J Marray	6	6
(Slovakia) K Beck (Slovakia) P Červenák	3	4
(France) O Charroin (Sweden) A Siljeström	6	6
(Belgium) R Bemelmans (Israel) A Weintraub	4	4
(Switzerland) Y Allegro (Germany) A Beck	1	6	[10]
(United Kingdom) D Rice (United Kingdom) S Thornley	6	3	[5]
(United Kingdom) C Eaton (United Kingdom) J Goodall	6	3	[8]
3	(France) N Mahut (France) É Roger-Vasselin	4	6	[10]
(Switzerland) G Bastl (Australia) J Sirianni	5
(United Kingdom) D Smethurst (United Kingdom) M Willis	1^{r}
(Sweden) E Eleskovic (Sweden) M Ryderstedt	6^{7}	7	[11]
2	(Sweden) J Brunström (Denmark) F Nielsen	7	6^{5}	[9]

Quarterfinals
(Switzerland) M Lammer (Slovakia) M Mečíř Jr.
(Slovakia) A Martin (Estonia) J Zopp	w/o
4	(United Kingdom) J Delgado (United Kingdom) J Marray	6	3	[10]
(France) O Charroin (Sweden) A Siljeström	1	6	[7]
(Switzerland) Y Allegro (Germany) A Beck	6	3	[10]
3	(France) N Mahut (France) É Roger-Vasselin	4	6	[7]
(Switzerland) G Bastl (Australia) J Sirianni	3	6^{1}
(Sweden) E Eleskovic (Sweden) M Ryderstedt	6	7

Semifinals
(Slovakia) A Martin (Estonia) J Zopp	2	6	[7]
4	(United Kingdom) J Delgado (United Kingdom) J Marray	6	4	[10]
(Switzerland) Y Allegro (Germany) A Beck	7	7
(Sweden) E Eleskovic (Sweden) M Ryderstedt	6^{5}	5

Final
4	(United Kingdom) J Delgado (United Kingdom) J Marray	6	6
(Switzerland) Y Allegro (Germany) A Beck	3	4
