= 2011 Aegon GB Pro-Series Bath – Women's doubles =

Women's doubles
- 2011 Aegon GB Pro-Series Bath

Final
- Champions: (Hungary) Tímea Babos (Luxembourg) Anne Kremer
- Runners-up: (Poland) Marta Domachowska (Poland) Katarzyna Piter
- Score: 7–6(5), 6–2

Events
Singles	men	women
Doubles	men	women
Aegon GB Pro-Series Bath	· 2012 →

This is the first edition of the tournament.
Tímea Babos and Anne Kremer won the tournament after defeating Marta Domachowska and Katarzyna Piter 7–6(5), 6–2 in the final.

== Seeds ==
1. (Austria) Sandra Klemenschits / (France) Irena Pavlovic (second round)
2. (Finland) Emma Laine / (United Kingdom) Melanie South (second round)
3. (Italy) Claudia Giovine / (Russia) Marta Sirotkina (semifinals)
4. (Greece) Irini Georgatou / (Romania) Liana Ungur (second round)

== Draw ==
=== Key ===
- Q = Qualifier
- WC = Wild card
- LL = Lucky loser
- Alt = Alternate
- SE = Special exempt
- PR = Protected ranking
- ITF = ITF entry
- JE = Junior exempt
- w/o = Walkover
- r = Retired
- d = Defaulted
- SR = Special ranking

=== Draw ===
First round
(United Kingdom) Amanda Elliott (United Kingdom) Jade Windley	7	0	[10]
(Poland) M Domachowska (Poland) K Piter	6^{5}	6	[12]
3	(Italy) Claudia Giovine (Russia) Marta Sirotkina	6	6
(France) Audrey Bergot (Bulgaria) E Kostova	4	2
(France) C Feuerstein (Croatia) A Vrljić	4	6	[10]
(Denmark) Karen Barbat (United Kingdom) Katy Dunne	6	2	[6]
(Spain) L Arruabarrena-Vecino (Spain) S Soler Espinosa
(United Kingdom) Lucy Brown (United Kingdom) Francesca Stephenson	w/o
(United Kingdom) Daneika Borthwick (United Kingdom) Lisa Whybourn	2	4
4	(Greece) I Georgatou (Romania) L Ungur	6	6
(United Kingdom) T Moore (United Kingdom) K O'Brien	1	6^{3}
(Hungary) T Babos (Luxembourg) A Kremer	6	7

Quarterfinals
1	(Austria) S Klemenschits (France) I Pavlovic	5	3
(Poland) M Domachowska (Poland) K Piter	7	6
3	(Italy) Claudia Giovine (Russia) Marta Sirotkina	6	6
(France) C Feuerstein (Croatia) A Vrljić	2	2
(United Kingdom) Lucy Brown (United Kingdom) Francesca Stephenson	w/o
4	(Greece) I Georgatou (Romania) L Ungur
(Hungary) T Babos (Luxembourg) A Kremer	6	7
2	(Finland) E Laine (United Kingdom) M South	2	5

Semifinals
(Poland) M Domachowska (Poland) K Piter	1
3	(Italy) Claudia Giovine (Russia) Marta Sirotkina	2^{r}
(United Kingdom) Lucy Brown (United Kingdom) Francesca Stephenson	0	5
(Hungary) T Babos (Luxembourg) A Kremer	6	7

Final
(Poland) M Domachowska (Poland) K Piter	6^{5}	2
(Hungary) T Babos (Luxembourg) A Kremer	7	6
