= 2011 Singapore ATP Challenger – Doubles =

Doubles
- 2011 Singapore ATP Challenger

Final
- Champions: (United States) Scott Lipsky (United States) David Martin
- Runners-up: (Thailand) Sanchai Ratiwatana (Thailand) Sonchat Ratiwatana
- Score: 5–7, 6–1, [10–8]

Events
Singles	Doubles
← 2010 ·	Singapore ATP Challenger	· 2012 →

1st seeds Scott Lipsky and David Martin won in the final 5–7, 6–1, [10–8], against Sanchai and Sonchat Ratiwatana.

== Seeds ==
1. (United States) Scott Lipsky / (United States) David Martin (champions)
2. (Thailand) Sanchai Ratiwatana / (Thailand) Sonchat Ratiwatana (final)
3. (Sweden) Johan Brunström / (Denmark) Frederik Nielsen (semifinals)
4. (Italy) Flavio Cipolla / (Italy) Simone Vagnozzi (first round)

== Draw ==
=== Key ===
- Q = Qualifier
- WC = Wild card
- LL = Lucky loser
- Alt = Alternate
- SE = Special exempt
- PR = Protected ranking
- ITF = ITF entry
- JE = Junior exempt
- w/o = Walkover
- r = Retired
- d = Defaulted
- SR = Special ranking

=== Draw ===
First round
1	(United States) S Lipsky (United States) D Martin	6	6
(Croatia) F Škugor (Croatia) L Zovko	1	2
(New Zealand) A Sitak (Italy) M Viola	4	3
(Canada) P Polansky (Japan) G Soeda	6	6
3	(Sweden) J Brunström (Denmark) F Nielsen	7	7
(Russia) A Kudryavtsev (Czech Republic) L Rosol	6^{5}	5
(Czech Republic) D Lojda (Czech Republic) I Minář	4	6^{4}
(Brazil) T Alves (Italy) P Lorenzi	6	7
WC	(Russia) D Tursunov (Chinese Taipei) Y-t Wang	6	7
WC	(Singapore) R Hobbs (Chinese Taipei) T-h Yang	0	5
(South Africa) R de Voest (India) S Devvarman	6	6
4	(Italy) F Cipolla (Italy) S Vagnozzi	4	3
(China) M Gong (China) Z Li	2	1
(Philippines) TC Huey (India) P Raja	6	6
WC	(India) K Rastogi (Indonesia) C Rungkat	4	1
2	(Thailand) Sa Ratiwatana (Thailand) So Ratiwatana	6	6

Quarterfinals
1	(United States) S Lipsky (United States) D Martin	6	6
(Canada) P Polansky (Japan) G Soeda	3	1
3	(Sweden) J Brunström (Denmark) F Nielsen
(Brazil) T Alves (Italy) P Lorenzi	w/o
WC	(Russia) D Tursunov (Chinese Taipei) Y-t Wang	4	6	[7]
(South Africa) R de Voest (India) S Devvarman	6	3	[10]
(Philippines) TC Huey (India) P Raja	6^{5}	6	[5]
2	(Thailand) Sa Ratiwatana (Thailand) So Ratiwatana	7	2	[10]

Semifinals
1	(United States) S Lipsky (United States) D Martin	7	3	[10]
3	(Sweden) J Brunström (Denmark) F Nielsen	6^{6}	6	[5]
(South Africa) R de Voest (India) S Devvarman	4	7	[7]
2	(Thailand) Sa Ratiwatana (Thailand) So Ratiwatana	6	6^{2}	[10]

Final
1	(United States) S Lipsky (United States) D Martin	5	6	[10]
2	(Thailand) Sa Ratiwatana (Thailand) So Ratiwatana	7	1	[8]
