= 2011 Aegon GB Pro-Series Bath – Women's singles =

Women's singles
- 2011 Aegon GB Pro-Series Bath

Final
- Champion: (Switzerland) Stefanie Vögele
- Runner-up: (Poland) Marta Domachowska
- Score: 6–7(3), 7–5, 6–2

Events
Singles	men	women
Doubles	men	women
Aegon GB Pro-Series Bath	· 2012 →

Stefanie Vögele won the first edition of the tournament, defeating Marta Domachowska 6–7(3), 7–5, 6–2 in the final.

== Seeds ==
1. (Netherlands) Michaëlla Krajicek (first round)
2. (Czech Republic) Petra Cetkovská (second round)
3. (Luxembourg) Anne Kremer (first round)
4. (Italy) Anna Floris (quarterfinals)
5. (Romania) Liana Ungur (first round)
6. (Germany) Mona Barthel (first round)
7. (Spain) Silvia Soler Espinosa (first round)
8. (Switzerland) Stefanie Vögele (champion)

== Draw ==
=== Key ===
- Q = Qualifier
- WC = Wild card
- LL = Lucky loser
- Alt = Alternate
- SE = Special exempt
- PR = Protected ranking
- ITF = ITF entry
- JE = Junior exempt
- w/o = Walkover
- r = Retired
- d = Defaulted
- SR = Special ranking

=== Finals ===
Semifinals
(Bulgaria) Elitsa Kostova	6^{3}	6	2
8	(Switzerland) Stefanie Vögele	7	4	6
Q	(France) Claire Feuerstein	3	6	4
Q	(Poland) Marta Domachowska	6	0	6

Final
8	(Switzerland) Stefanie Vögele	6^{3}	7	6
Q	(Poland) Marta Domachowska	7	5	2

=== Top half ===
First round
1	(Netherlands) M Krajicek	6^{6}	2
(Poland) K Piter	7	6
LL	(Germany) S Gronert	4	1
(Bulgaria) E Kostova	6	6
Q	(United Kingdom) N Broady	7	6^{6}	6
(France) S Beltrame	6^{5}	7	2
Q	(United Kingdom) M South	4	6	6
6	(Germany) M Barthel	6	2	4
4	(Italy) A Floris	3	6	7
(Slovakia) L Juríková	6	2	5
WC	(United Kingdom) Katy Dunne	4	3
WC	(United Kingdom) Nicola George	6	6
WC	(United Kingdom) Lucy Brown	4	3
Q	(Spain) L Arruabarrena-Vecino	6	6
(France) I Pavlovic	3	3
8	(Switzerland) S Vögele	6	6

Second round
(Poland) K Piter	1	7	2
(Bulgaria) E Kostova	6	6^{10}	6
Q	(United Kingdom) N Broady	4	6	6^{5}
Q	(United Kingdom) M South	6	1	7
4	(Italy) A Floris	6	6
WC	(United Kingdom) Nicola George	4	1
Q	(Spain) L Arruabarrena-Vecino	3	3
8	(Switzerland) S Vögele	6	6

Quarterfinals
(Bulgaria) E Kostova	3	6	6
Q	(United Kingdom) M South	6	2	4
4	(Italy) A Floris	6^{4}	4
8	(Switzerland) S Vögele	7	6

Semifinals
(Bulgaria) E Kostova	6^{3}	6	2
8	(Switzerland) S Vögele	7	4	6

=== Bottom half ===
First round
5	(Romania) L Ungur	0	0^{r}
(Greece) I Georgatou	6	2
Q	(France) C Feuerstein	6	6
(United Kingdom) K O'Brien	1	3
Q	(Spain) Leticia Costas-Moreira	1	6^{6}
Q	(Russia) Marta Sirotkina	6	7
Q	(Germany) A-L Grönefeld	6	6^{5}	7
3	(Luxembourg) A Kremer	0	7	5
7	(Spain) S Soler Espinosa	6^{3}	3^{r}
(Netherlands) K Bertens	7	4
WC	(United Kingdom) Jade Windley	6	6^{9}	6^{8}
(France) Audrey Bergot	4	7	7
JE	(Hungary) T Babos	6^{3}	3
Q	(Poland) M Domachowska	7	6
(Croatia) A Vrljić	3	6	4
2	(Czech Republic) P Cetkovská	6	4	6

Second round
(Greece) I Georgatou	4	6	1
Q	(France) C Feuerstein	6	3	6
Q	(Russia) Marta Sirotkina	6	6
Q	(Germany) A-L Grönefeld	0	2
(Netherlands) K Bertens	6	5	6
(France) Audrey Bergot	3	7	3
Q	(Poland) M Domachowska	6	6^{7}	6
2	(Czech Republic) P Cetkovská	2	7	3

Quarterfinals
Q	(France) C Feuerstein	4	6	7
Q	(Russia) Marta Sirotkina	6	3	6^{6}
(Netherlands) K Bertens	4	6	3
Q	(Poland) M Domachowska	6	3	6

Semifinals
Q	(France) C Feuerstein	3	6	4
Q	(Poland) M Domachowska	6	0	6
