= 2011 Singapore ATP Challenger – Singles =

Tennis contest held in Singapore

Singles
- 2011 Singapore ATP Challenger

Final
- Champion: (Russia) Dmitry Tursunov
- Runner-up: (Czech Republic) Lukáš Rosol
- Score: 6–4, 6–2

Events
Singles	Doubles
← 2010 ·	Singapore ATP Challenger	· 2012 →

Dmitry Tursunov won the first edition of this tournament, by defeating Lukáš Rosol 6–4, 6–2 in the final.

== Seeds ==
1. (India) Somdev Devvarman (quarterfinals)
2. (Japan) Go Soeda (semifinals)
3. (Italy) Paolo Lorenzi (second round)
4. (Russia) Alexandre Kudryavtsev (first round)
5. (Czech Republic) Lukáš Rosol (final)
6. (Czech Republic) Ivo Minář (first round)
7. (Brazil) Thiago Alves (first round)
8. (Slovakia) Andrej Martin (semifinals)

== Draw ==
=== Key ===
- Q = Qualifier
- WC = Wild card
- LL = Lucky loser
- Alt = Alternate
- ITF = ITF entry
- PR = Protected ranking
- SR = Special ranking
- SE = Special exempt
- JE = Junior exempt
- JR = Junior Accelerator Programme entrant
- CO = College Accelerator Programme entrant
- NG = Next Gen Accelerator Program entrant
- w/o = Walkover
- r = Retired
- d = Defaulted

=== Finals ===
Semifinals
8	(Slovakia) Andrej Martin	4	3
WC	(Russia) Dmitry Tursunov	6	6
5	(Czech Republic) Lukáš Rosol	6	7
2	(Japan) Go Soeda	4	6^{2}

Final
WC	(Russia) Dmitry Tursunov	6	6
5	(Czech Republic) Lukáš Rosol	4	2

=== Top half ===
First round
1	(India) S Devvarman	6	6
WC	(Thailand) P Siriluethaiwattana	2	1
(Australia) J Millman	7	6^{5}	6
WC	(Ukraine) S Bubka	6^{2}	7	2
(Italy) M Viola	5	6	7
(United Kingdom) J Ward	7	0	5
(Italy) S Vagnozzi	3	2
8	(Slovakia) A Martin	6	6
4	(Russia) A Kudryavtsev	1	2
(Italy) F Cipolla	6	6
(Czech Republic) D Lojda	6	7
(Italy) M Crugnola	2	5
(Australia) B Klein	1	6	4
WC	(India) K Rastogi	6	3	6
WC	(Russia) D Tursunov	6	6
6	(Czech Republic) I Minář	2	4

Second round
1	(India) S Devvarman	6	6
(Australia) J Millman	4	3
(Italy) M Viola	4	5
8	(Slovakia) A Martin	6	7
(Italy) F Cipolla	6
(Czech Republic) D Lojda	0	r
WC	(India) K Rastogi	3	2
WC	(Russia) D Tursunov	6	6

Quarterfinals
1	(India) S Devvarman	3	4
8	(Slovakia) A Martin	6	6
(Italy) F Cipolla	7	3	2
WC	(Russia) D Tursunov	5	6	6

Semifinals
8	(Slovakia) A Martin	4	3
WC	(Russia) D Tursunov	6	6

=== Bottom half ===
First round
5	(Czech Republic) L Rosol	7	7
(South Africa) R de Voest	6^{6}	6^{5}
Q	(Chinese Taipei) T-h Yang	7	3	0
(United States) R Ram	6^{7}	6	6
Q	(New Zealand) A Sitak	1	6^{4}
(United States) M Yani	6	7
(Croatia) F Škugor	4	6	3
3	(Italy) P Lorenzi	6	3	6
7	(Brazil) T Alves	1	1
(Japan) T Ito	6	6
(Canada) P Polansky	6^{4}	4
(Sweden) N Lindahl	7	6
Q	(Switzerland) M Lammer	6	3	1
(Slovakia) I Klec	4	6	6
Q	(Denmark) F Nielsen	6^{7}	3
2	(Japan) G Soeda	7	6

Second round
5	(Czech Republic) L Rosol	7	4	7
(United States) R Ram	5	6	6^{6}
(United States) M Yani	6	6
3	(Italy) P Lorenzi	2	4
(Japan) T Ito	6	1
(Sweden) N Lindahl	0	2	r
(Slovakia) I Klec	5	3
2	(Japan) G Soeda	7	6

Quarterfinals
5	(Czech Republic) L Rosol	4	6	6
(United States) M Yani	6	4	2
(Japan) T Ito	3	0
2	(Japan) G Soeda	6	6

Semifinals
5	(Czech Republic) L Rosol	6	7
2	(Japan) G Soeda	4	6^{2}
