= 2011 Aegon GB Pro-Series Bath =

Tennis tournament

- Date: 21–27 March
- Edition: 1st
- Surface: Hard
- Location: Bath, Great Britain

Champions

Men's singles
- (Russia) Dmitry Tursunov

Women's singles
- (Switzerland) Stefanie Vögele

Men's doubles
- (United Kingdom) Jamie Delgado / (United Kingdom) Jonathan Marray

Women's doubles
- (Hungary) Tímea Babos / (Luxembourg) Anne Kremer
Aegon GB Pro-Series Bath	· 2012 →

The 2011 Aegon GB Pro-Series Bath was a professional tennis tournament played on hard courts. It was the first edition of the tournament which was part of the 2011 ATP Challenger Tour and the 2011 ITF Women's Circuit. It took place in Bath, Great Britain between 21 and 27 March 2011.

== ATP singles main-draw entrants ==
=== Seeds ===
Country	Player	Rank^{1}	Seed
FRA	Nicolas Mahut	93	1
GER	Dustin Brown	100	2
RUS	Dmitry Tursunov	104	3
LUX	Gilles Müller	108	4
FRA	Édouard Roger-Vasselin	118	5
GER	Andreas Beck	130	6
SVK	Karol Beck	133	7
IRL	Conor Niland	135	8

=== Other entrants ===
The following players received wildcards into the singles main draw:

- (United Kingdom) Daniel Cox
- (United Kingdom) Daniel Evans
- (United Kingdom) Joshua Milton
- (United Kingdom) Daniel Smethurst

The following players received entry from the qualifying draw:

- (Sweden) Ervin Eleskovic
- (Switzerland) Michael Lammer
- (Slovakia) Miloslav Mečíř Jr.
- (United Kingdom) Alexander Ward

== WTA singles main-draw entrants ==
=== Seeds ===
Country	Player	Rank^{1}	Seed
NED	Michaëlla Krajicek	128	1
CZE	Petra Cetkovská	138	2
LUX	Anne Kremer	145	3
ITA	Anna Floris	157	4
ROU	Liana Ungur	168	5
GER	Mona Barthel	166	6
ESP	Sílvia Soler Espinosa	167	7
SUI	Stefanie Vögele	181	8

=== Other entrants ===
The following players received wildcards into the singles main draw:

- (United Kingdom) Lucy Brown
- (United Kingdom) Katy Dunne
- (United Kingdom) Nicola George
- (United Kingdom) Jade Windley

The following players received entry from the qualifying draw:

- (United Kingdom) Naomi Broady
- (Poland) Marta Domachowska
- (France) Claire Feuerstein
- (Germany) Anna-Lena Grönefeld
- (Spain) Leticia Costas-Moreira
- (Russia) Marta Sirotkina
- (United Kingdom) Melanie South
- (Spain) Lara Arruabarrena-Vecino

The following players received entry as a lucky loser from the qualifying draw:

- (Germany) Sarah Gronert

== Champions ==
=== Men's singles ===
(Russia) Dmitry Tursunov def. (Germany) Andreas Beck, 6–4, 6–4

=== Women's singles ===
(Switzerland) Stefanie Vögele def. (Poland) Marta Domachowska, 6–7(3), 7–5, 6–2

=== Men's doubles ===
(United Kingdom) Jamie Delgado / (United Kingdom) Jonathan Marray def. (Switzerland) Yves Allegro / (Germany) Andreas Beck, 6–3, 6–4

=== Women's doubles ===
(Hungary) Tímea Babos / (Luxembourg) Anne Kremer def. (Poland) Marta Domachowska / (Poland) Katarzyna Piter, 7–6(5), 6–2
