= 2012 Aegon GB Pro-Series Bath – Men's doubles =

Men's doubles
- 2012 Aegon GB Pro-Series Bath

Final
- Champions: (Austria) Martin Fischer (Austria) Philipp Oswald
- Runners-up: (United Kingdom) Jamie Delgado (United Kingdom) Ken Skupski
- Score: 6–4, 6–4

Events
Singles	men	women
Doubles	men	women
← 2011 ·	Aegon GB Pro-Series Bath

Jamie Delgado and Jonathan Marray were the defending champions but decided not to participate together.
Delgado played alongside Ken Skupski, finishing runner-up. Marray partnered up with Dustin Brown, reaching the semifinals.
Martin Fischer and Philipp Oswald won the title, defeating Delgado and Skupski 6–4, 6–4 in the final.

== Seeds ==
1. (Germany) Dustin Brown / (United Kingdom) Jonathan Marray (semifinals)
2. (Sweden) Johan Brunström / (Germany) Philipp Marx (quarterfinals)
3. (United Kingdom) Jamie Delgado / (United Kingdom) Ken Skupski (final)
4. (Austria) Martin Fischer / (Austria) Philipp Oswald (champions)

== Draw ==
=== Key ===
- Q = Qualifier
- WC = Wild card
- LL = Lucky loser
- Alt = Alternate
- SE = Special exempt
- PR = Protected ranking
- ITF = ITF entry
- JE = Junior exempt
- w/o = Walkover
- r = Retired
- d = Defaulted
- SR = Special ranking

=== Draw ===
First round
1	(Germany) D Brown (United Kingdom) J Marray	7^{8}	6
WC	(United Kingdom) J Goodall (United Kingdom) S Thornley	6^{6}	3
(Germany) A Beck (Germany) D Brands	4	4
WC	(United Kingdom) L Burton (United Kingdom) E Corrie	6	6
3	(United Kingdom) J Delgado (United Kingdom) K Skupski	6	3	[10]
(Republic of Ireland) J Cluskey (India) P Raja	4	6	[8]
(United Kingdom) C Eaton (United Kingdom) D Inglot	6	4	[5]
(Australia) R Junaid (Germany) S Stadler	2	6	[10]
(Lithuania) L Grigelis (Belarus) U Ignatik	6	7
WC	(United Kingdom) L Broady (United Kingdom) O Golding	3	5
(Netherlands) J Huta Galung (Spain) I Navarro	5	3
4	(Austria) M Fischer (Austria) P Oswald	7	6
(Czech Republic) J Hernych (Czech Republic) D Škoch	6	1	[10]
(France) K de Schepper (France) R Jouan	4	6	[3]
(Austria) N Moser (Germany) P Torebko	7^{7}	3	[9]
2	(Sweden) J Brunström (Germany) P Marx	6^{5}	6	[11]

Quarterfinals
1	(Germany) D Brown (United Kingdom) J Marray	6	6
WC	(United Kingdom) L Burton (United Kingdom) E Corrie	4	4
3	(United Kingdom) J Delgado (United Kingdom) K Skupski	7	6
(Australia) R Junaid (Germany) S Stadler	5	3
(Lithuania) L Grigelis (Belarus) U Ignatik	3	2
4	(Austria) M Fischer (Austria) P Oswald	6	6
(Czech Republic) J Hernych (Czech Republic) D Škoch	6	6
2	(Sweden) J Brunström (Germany) P Marx	0	1

Semifinals
1	(Germany) D Brown (United Kingdom) J Marray	6^{4}	7^{8}	[7]
3	(United Kingdom) J Delgado (United Kingdom) K Skupski	7^{7}	6^{6}	[10]
4	(Austria) M Fischer (Austria) P Oswald	7^{7}	6
(Czech Republic) J Hernych (Czech Republic) D Škoch	6^{5}	1

Final
3	(United Kingdom) J Delgado (United Kingdom) K Skupski	4	4
4	(Austria) M Fischer (Austria) P Oswald	6	6
