= 2012 Aegon GB Pro-Series Bath – Men's singles =

Men's singles
- 2012 Aegon GB Pro-Series Bath

Final
- Champion: (Germany) Dustin Brown
- Runner-up: (Czech Republic) Jan Mertl
- Score: 7–6^{(7–1)}, 6–4

Events
Singles	men	women
Doubles	men	women
- Aegon GB Pro-Series Bath

Dmitry Tursunov was the defending champion but decided not to participate.

Dustin Brown won the title, defeating Jan Mertl 7–6^{(7–1)}, 6–4 in the final.

== Seeds ==
1. (Germany) Andreas Beck (quarterfinals)
2. (Germany) Michael Berrer (semifinals)
3. (Germany) Daniel Brands (second round)
4. (France) Kenny de Schepper (second round)
5. (Germany) Dustin Brown (champion)
6. (Belarus) Uladzimir Ignatik (second round)
7. (Serbia) Dušan Lajović (second round)
8. (Austria) Martin Fischer (first round)

== Draw ==
Key

- Q = Qualifier
- WC = Wild card
- LL = Lucky loser
- Alt = Alternate
- ITF = ITF entry
- PR = Protected ranking
- SR = Special ranking
- SE = Special exempt
- JE = Junior exempt
- JR = Junior Accelerator Programme entrant
- CO = College Accelerator Programme entrant
- NG = Next Gen Accelerator Program entrant
- w/o = Walkover
- r = Retired
- d = Defaulted

=== Finals ===
Semifinals
5	(Germany) Dustin Brown	6	3	6
(United Kingdom) Jamie Baker	4	6	2
(Czech Republic) Jan Mertl	2	6	6
2	(Germany) Michael Berrer	6	4	3

Final
5	(Germany) Dustin Brown	7^{7}	6
(Czech Republic) Jan Mertl	6^{1}	4

=== Top half ===
First round
1	(Germany) A Beck	6	6
WC	(United Kingdom) O Golding	1	2
WC	(United Kingdom) D Smethurst	1	4
Q	(Sweden) M Ryderstedt	6	6
(Poland) J Janowicz	6	5	6
Q	(Ukraine) I Marchenko	3	7	4
(Moldova) R Albot	5	4
5	(Germany) D Brown	7	6
3	(Germany) D Brands	2	7	6
(Czech Republic) J Hernych	6	5	4
WC	(United Kingdom) L Broady	6	3	2
(France) R Jouan	3	6	6
(United Kingdom) J Baker	7	7
(Romania) M Copil	5	5
WC	(United Kingdom) J Goodall	3	4
7	(Serbia) D Lajović	6	6

Second round
1	(Germany) A Beck	7^{7}	4	6
Q	(Sweden) M Ryderstedt	6^{5}	6	3
(Poland) J Janowicz	6	3	6^{5}
5	(Germany) D Brown	4	6	7^{7}
3	(Germany) D Brands	6^{3}	7^{7}	3
(France) R Jouan	7^{7}	6^{2}	6
(United Kingdom) J Baker	4	7	6
7	(Serbia) D Lajović	6	5	2

Quarterfinals
1	(Germany) A Beck	6^{7}	6	4
5	(Germany) D Brown	7^{9}	4	6
(France) R Jouan	6	4	3
(United Kingdom) J Baker	3	6	6

Semifinals
5	(Germany) D Brown	6	3	6
(United Kingdom) J Baker	4	6	2

=== Bottom half ===
First round
6	(Belarus) U Ignatik	6	7
(France) G Burquier	4	5
(Belgium) Y Mertens	4	6	6
Q	(Finland) T Nieminen	6	4	4
(Netherlands) T de Bakker	2	6	6^{5}
(Czech Republic) J Mertl	6	4	7^{7}
(Slovakia) K Čapkovič	0^{r}
4	(France) K de Schepper	1
8	(Austria) M Fischer	6	3	5
(Lithuania) L Grigelis	4	6	7
(Spain) I Navarro	3	4
(Austria) P Oswald	6	6
(Germany) P Torebko	4	2
Q	(Czech Republic) M Michalička	6	6
(Netherlands) J Huta Galung	3	4
2	(Germany) M Berrer	6	6

Second round
6	(Belarus) U Ignatik	6	4	6^{4}
(Belgium) Y Mertens	4	6	7^{7}
(Czech Republic) J Mertl	7^{7}	6
4	(France) K de Schepper	6^{3}	3
(Lithuania) L Grigelis	6	6
(Austria) P Oswald	4	4
Q	(Czech Republic) M Michalička	3	2
2	(Germany) M Berrer	6	6

Quarterfinals
(Belgium) Y Mertens	4	3
(Czech Republic) J Mertl	6	6
(Lithuania) L Grigelis	3	6	5
2	(Germany) M Berrer	6	3	7

Semifinals
(Czech Republic) J Mertl	2	6	6
2	(Germany) M Berrer	6	4	3
