= 2012 Singapore ATP Challenger – Singles =

Singles
- 2012 Singapore ATP Challenger

Final
- Champion: (Chinese Taipei) Lu Yen-hsun
- Runner-up: (Japan) Go Soeda
- Score: 6–3, 6–4

Events
Singles	Doubles
- Singapore ATP Challenger

The 2012 Singapore ATP Challenger was a professional tennis tournament played on hard courts. It was the second edition of the tournament which was part of the 2012 ATP Challenger Tour. It took place in Singapore between February 27 and March 4, 2012.

Dmitry Tursunov was the defending champion but decided not to participate. Lu Yen-hsun won the title, defeating Go Soeda 6–3, 6–4 in the final.

== Seeds ==
1. (Chinese Taipei) Lu Yen-hsun (champion)
2. (Japan) Go Soeda (final)
3. (Japan) Yūichi Sugita (second round)
4. (Thailand) Danai Udomchoke (semifinals)
5. (Chinese Taipei) Yang Tsung-hua (first round)
6. (Australia) Benjamin Mitchell (first round)
7. (Finland) Harri Heliövaara (first round, retired due to neck pain)
8. (Israel) Amir Weintraub (quarterfinals)

== Draw ==
Key

- Q = Qualifier
- WC = Wild card
- LL = Lucky loser
- Alt = Alternate
- ITF = ITF entry
- PR = Protected ranking
- SR = Special ranking
- SE = Special exempt
- JE = Junior exempt
- JR = Junior Accelerator Programme entrant
- CO = College Accelerator Programme entrant
- NG = Next Gen Accelerator Program entrant
- w/o = Walkover
- r = Retired
- d = Defaulted

=== Finals ===
Semifinals
1	(Chinese Taipei) Lu Yen-hsun	6	6
(Chinese Taipei) Jimmy Wang	3	1
4	(Thailand) Danai Udomchoke	2	7^{7}	2
2	(Japan) Go Soeda	6	6^{2}	6

Final
1	(Chinese Taipei) Lu Yen-hsun	6	6
2	(Japan) Go Soeda	3	4

=== Top half ===
First round
1	(Chinese Taipei) Y-h Lu	6	6
(Australia) Michael Look	3	3
WC	(Chinese Taipei) L-c Huang	6	5	6
(Ukraine) D Molchanov	3	7	2
Q	(India) D Sharan	2	2
(India) Y Bhambri	6	6
WC	(Indonesia) C Rungkat	7
7	(Finland) H Heliövaara	5	r
3	(Japan) Y Sugita	6	6
(South Korea) Y-k Lim	3	1
(Germany) S Rieschick	6	6
WC	(Thailand) P Siriluethaiwattana	3	3
(Chinese Taipei) J Wang	6	6
(Chinese Taipei) T Chen	0	3
(China) Z Zhang	7	7
5	(Chinese Taipei) T-h Yang	5	5

Second round
1	(Chinese Taipei) Y-h Lu	6	6
WC	(Chinese Taipei) L-c Huang	0	1
(India) Y Bhambri	4	6	7^{8}
WC	(Indonesia) C Rungkat	6	3	6^{6}
3	(Japan) Y Sugita	4	4
(Germany) S Rieschick	6	6
(Chinese Taipei) J Wang	7^{7}	6
(China) Z Zhang	6^{4}	3

Quarterfinals
1	(Chinese Taipei) Y-h Lu	7^{7}	6
(India) Y Bhambri	6^{4}	4
(Germany) S Rieschick	3	4
(Chinese Taipei) J Wang	6	6

Semifinals
1	(Chinese Taipei) Y-h Lu	6	6
(Chinese Taipei) J Wang	3	1

=== Bottom half ===
First round
8	(Israel) A Weintraub	6	6
WC	(India) V Vardhan	4	2
(Italy) R Ghedin	6^{5}	3
Q	(New Zealand) JR Statham	7^{7}	6
Q	(Japan) Hiroyasu Ehara	6	6
(Japan) H Moriya	3	3
(Australia) J Millman	6	6^{5}	2
4	(Thailand) D Udomchoke	3	7^{7}	6
6	(Australia) B Mitchell	4	4
(Slovakia) K Čapkovič	6	6
(Canada) É Chvojka	6	7
(Finland) T Nieminen	1	5
Q	(Switzerland) H Laaksonen	6	6
(France) Laurent Rochette	3	3
(Republic of Ireland) C Niland	2	1
2	(Japan) G Soeda	6	6

Second round
8	(Israel) A Weintraub	6	6
Q	(New Zealand) JR Statham	3	2
Q	(Japan) H Ehara	1	0
4	(Thailand) D Udomchoke	6	6
(Slovakia) K Čapkovič	7	6
(Canada) É Chvojka	5	0
Q	(Switzerland) H Laaksonen	3	3
2	(Japan) G Soeda	6	6

Quarterfinals
8	(Israel) A Weintraub	6	4	3
4	(Thailand) D Udomchoke	3	6	6
(Slovakia) K Čapkovič	5	2
2	(Japan) G Soeda	7	6

Semifinals
4	(Thailand) D Udomchoke	2	7^{7}	2
2	(Japan) G Soeda	6	6^{2}	6
