= 2012 Singapore ATP Challenger – Doubles =

Doubles
- 2012 Singapore ATP Challenger

Final
- Champions: (Slovakia) Kamil Čapkovič (Israel) Amir Weintraub
- Runners-up: (Chinese Taipei) Hsieh Cheng-peng (Chinese Taipei) Lee Hsin-han
- Score: 6–4, 6–4

Events
Singles	Doubles
← 2011 ·	Singapore ATP Challenger	· 2013 →

The 2012 Singapore ATP Challenger was a professional tennis tournament played on hard courts. It was the second edition of the tournament which was part of the 2012 ATP Challenger Tour. It took place in Singapore between February 27 and March 4, 2012.

Scott Lipsky and David Martin were the defending champions but decided not to participate. Kamil Čapkovič and Amir Weintraub won the title, defeating Hsieh Cheng-peng and Lee Hsin-han 6–4, 6–4 in the final.

== Seeds ==
1. (United States) John Paul Fruttero / (South Africa) Raven Klaasen (semifinals)
2. (Thailand) Sanchai Ratiwatana / (Thailand) Sonchat Ratiwatana (quarterfinals)
3. (Finland) Harri Heliövaara / (Ukraine) Denys Molchanov (quarterfinals)
4. (India) Divij Sharan / (India) Vishnu Vardhan (first round)

== Draw ==
=== Key ===
- Q = Qualifier
- WC = Wild card
- LL = Lucky loser
- Alt = Alternate
- SE = Special exempt
- PR = Protected ranking
- ITF = ITF entry
- JE = Junior exempt
- w/o = Walkover
- r = Retired
- d = Defaulted
- SR = Special ranking

=== Draw ===
First round
1	(United States) JP Fruttero (South Africa) R Klaasen	6	7^{10}
(Chinese Taipei) T Chen (Canada) É Chvojka	1	6^{8}
WC	(Singapore) R Hobbs (Japan) Y Ito	1	1
(Australia) A Feeney (Germany) A Satschko	6	6
3	(Finland) H Heliövaara (Ukraine) D Molchanov	7	6
(Italy) R Ghedin (New Zealand) J Statham	5	2
(Germany) S Rieschick (Thailand) D Udomchoke	1	7^{7}	[5]
(Slovakia) K Čapkovič (Israel) A Weintraub	6	6^{5}	[10]
WC	(India) Y Bhambri (Chinese Taipei) L-c Huang	4	2
(Chinese Taipei) J Wang (Chinese Taipei) T-h Yang	6	6
(India) P Raja (India) K Rastogi	2	6	[10]
4	(India) D Sharan (India) V Vardhan	6	3	[6]
Alt	(Australia) J Millman (France) Laurent Rochette	3	1
(Chinese Taipei) C-p Hsieh (Chinese Taipei) H-h Lee	6	6
(Indonesia) C Rungkat (Japan) Y Sugita	4	0^{r}
2	(Thailand) Sa Ratiwatana (Thailand) So Ratiwatana	6	4

Quarterfinals
1	(United States) JP Fruttero (South Africa) R Klaasen	6	4	[10]
(Australia) A Feeney (Germany) A Satschko	2	6	[3]
3	(Finland) H Heliövaara (Ukraine) D Molchanov	4	6	[3]
(Slovakia) K Čapkovič (Israel) A Weintraub	6	4	[10]
(Chinese Taipei) J Wang (Chinese Taipei) T-h Yang	6	6
(India) P Raja (India) K Rastogi	3	4
(Chinese Taipei) C-p Hsieh (Chinese Taipei) H-h Lee	7	7
2	(Thailand) Sa Ratiwatana (Thailand) So Ratiwatana	5	5

Semifinals
1	(United States) JP Fruttero (South Africa) R Klaasen	2	6^{4}
(Slovakia) K Čapkovič (Israel) A Weintraub	6	7^{7}
(Chinese Taipei) J Wang (Chinese Taipei) T-h Yang	1	4
(Chinese Taipei) C-p Hsieh (Chinese Taipei) H-h Lee	6	6

Final
(Slovakia) K Čapkovič (Israel) A Weintraub	6	6
(Chinese Taipei) C-p Hsieh (Chinese Taipei) H-h Lee	4	4
