= 2011 Singapore ATP Challenger =

- Date: 24–31 January
- Edition: 1st
- Location: Singapore
- Venue: Kallang Tennis Centre

Champions

Singles
- (Russia) Dmitry Tursunov

Doubles
- (United States) Scott Lipsky / (United States) David Martin
Singapore ATP Challenger	· 2012 →

The 2011 Singapore ATP Challenger was a professional tennis tournament played on hard courts. It was held at Kallang Tennis Centre in Singapore. It was the first edition of the tournament which was part of the 2011 ATP Challenger Tour and took place between 24 and 30 January 2011.

== ATP entrants ==
=== Seeds ===
Country	Player	Rank^{1}	Seed
IND	Somdev Devvarman	108	1
JPN	Go Soeda	119	2
ITA	Paolo Lorenzi	140	3
RUS	Alexander Kudryavtsev	147	4
CZE	Lukáš Rosol	162	5
CZE	Ivo Minář	168	6
BRA	Thiago Alves	169	7
SVK	Andrej Martin	177	8

- Rankings are as of 17 January 2011.

=== Other entrants ===
The following players received wildcards into the singles main draw:

- (Ukraine) Sergei Bubka
- (India) Karan Rastogi
- (Thailand) Peerakiat Siriluethaiwattana
- (Russia) Dmitry Tursunov

The following players received entry from the qualifying draw:

- (Switzerland) Michael Lammer
- (Denmark) Frederik Nielsen
- (New Zealand) Artem Sitak
- (Chinese Taipei) Yang Tsung-hua

== Champions ==
=== Singles ===
(Russia) Dmitry Tursunov def. (Czech Republic) Lukáš Rosol, 6–4, 6–2

=== Doubles ===
(United States) Scott Lipsky / (United States) David Martin def. (Thailand) Sanchai Ratiwatana / (Thailand) Sonchat Ratiwatana, 5–7, 6–1, [10–8]
