= 2012 Singapore ATP Challenger =

- Date: 4 March 2012
- Edition: 2nd
- Location: Singapore, Singapore

Champions

Singles
- (Chinese Taipei) Lu Yen-hsun

Doubles
- (Slovakia) Kamil Čapkovič / (Israel) Amir Weintraub
← 2011 ·	Singapore ATP Challenger	· 2013 →

The 2012 Singapore ATP Challenger was a professional tennis tournament played on hard courts. It was the second edition of the tournament which was part of the 2012 ATP Challenger Tour. It took place in Singapore between 27 February and 4 March 2012.

== Singles main-draw entrants ==
=== Seeds ===
Country	Player	Rank^{1}	Seed
TPE	Lu Yen-hsun	64	1
JPN	Go Soeda	82	2
JPN	Yūichi Sugita	173	3
THA	Danai Udomchoke	175	4
TPE	Yang Tsung-hua	185	5
AUS	Benjamin Mitchell	209	6
FIN	Harri Heliövaara	210	7
ISR	Amir Weintraub	211	8

- Rankings are as of 20 February 2012.

=== Other entrants ===
The following players received wildcards into the singles main draw:

- (Chinese Taipei) Huang Liang-chi
- (Indonesia) Christopher Rungkat
- (Thailand) Peerakiat Siriluethaiwattana
- (India) Vishnu Vardhan

The following players received entry from the qualifying draw:

- (Japan) Hiroyasu Ehara
- (Switzerland) Henri Laaksonen
- (India) Divij Sharan
- (New Zealand) Jose Statham

== Champions ==
=== Singles ===
(Chinese Taipei) Lu Yen-hsun def. (Japan) Go Soeda, 6–3, 6–4

=== Doubles ===
(Slovakia) Kamil Čapkovič / (Israel) Amir Weintraub def. (Chinese Taipei) Hsieh Cheng-peng / (Chinese Taipei) Lee Hsin-han, 6–4, 6–4
