= 2012 Aegon GB Pro-Series Bath =

- Date: 19–25 March
- Edition: 2nd
- Surface: Hard
- Location: Bath, Great Britain

Champions

Men's singles
- (Germany) Dustin Brown

Women's singles
- (Netherlands) Kiki Bertens

Men's doubles
- (Austria) Martin Fischer / (Austria) Philipp Oswald

Women's doubles
- (Germany) Tatjana Malek / (Liechtenstein) Stephanie Vogt
← 2011 ·	Aegon GB Pro-Series Bath

The 2012 Aegon GB Pro-Series Bath was a professional tennis tournament played on hard courts. It was the second edition of the tournament which was part of the 2012 ATP Challenger Tour and the 2012 ITF Women's Circuit. It took place in Bath, Great Britain between 19 and 25 March 2012.

== ATP singles main-draw entrants ==
=== Seeds ===
Country	Player	Rank^{1}	Seed
GER	Andreas Beck	96	1
GER	Michael Berrer	116	2
GER	Daniel Brands	131	3
FRA	Kenny de Schepper	166	4
GER	Dustin Brown	177	5
BLR	Uladzimir Ignatik	197	6
SRB	Dušan Lajović	199	7
AUT	Martin Fischer	200	8

- ^{1} Rankings are as of 12 March 2012.

=== Other entrants ===
The following players received wildcards into the singles main draw:

- (United Kingdom) Liam Broady
- (United Kingdom) Oliver Golding
- (United Kingdom) Joshua Goodall
- (United Kingdom) Daniel Smethurst

The following players received entry from the qualifying draw:

- (Ukraine) Illya Marchenko
- (Czech Republic) Marek Michalička
- (Finland) Timo Nieminen
- (Sweden) Michael Ryderstedt

== WTA singles main-draw entrants ==
=== Seeds ===
Country	Player	Rank^{1}	Seed
BUL	Elitsa Kostova	151	1
NED	Kiki Bertens	172	2
GER	Sarah Gronert	174	3
GER	Annika Beck	203	4
GER	Tatjana Malek	206	5
ISR	Julia Glushko	213	6
LTU	Lina Stančiūtė	229	7
AUS	Johanna Konta	234	8

- ^{1} Rankings are as of 12 March 2012.

=== Other entrants ===
The following players received wildcards into the singles main draw:

- (United Kingdom) Lucy Brown
- (United Kingdom) Samantha Murray
- (United Kingdom) Francesca Stephenson

The following player received entry into the singles main draw with a protected ranking:

- (Spain) María Teresa Torró Flor

The following players received entry into the singles main draw as a junior exempt:

- (Estonia) Anett Kontaveit

The following players received entry from the qualifying draw:

- (Czech Republic) Martina Borecká
- (Switzerland) Viktorija Golubic
- (France) Elixane Lechemia
- (Latvia) Diāna Marcinkēviča
- (Czech Republic) Tereza Martincová
- (Russia) Marina Melnikova
- (Poland) Katarzyna Piter
- (Poland) Patrycja Sanduska

The following players received entry from the qualifying draw as a lucky loser:

- (Germany) Julia Kimmelmann

== Champions ==
=== Men's singles ===
- (Germany) Dustin Brown def. (Czech Republic) Jan Mertl, 7–6^{(7–1)}, 6–4

=== Women's singles ===
- (Netherlands) Kiki Bertens def. (Germany) Annika Beck, 6–4, 3–6, 6–3

=== Men's doubles ===
- (Austria) Martin Fischer / (Austria) Philipp Oswald def. (United Kingdom) Jamie Delgado / (United Kingdom) Ken Skupski, 6–4, 6–4

=== Women's doubles ===
- (Germany) Tatjana Malek / (Liechtenstein) Stephanie Vogt def. (France) Julie Coin / (United Kingdom) Melanie South, 6–3, 3–6, [10–3]
