= Ervin Eleskovic =

Swedish tennis player

- Country (sports): Sweden
- Residence: Helsingborg, Sweden
- Born: 8 May 1987 (age 37); Bileća, Bosnia and Herzegovina
- Retired: 2014
- Plays: Right-handed
- Prize money: $124,271

Singles
- Career record: 2–9
- Career titles: 0
- Highest ranking: No. 351 (13 June 2011)

Grand Slam singles results
- Australian Open: –
- French Open: –
- Wimbledon: –
- US Open: –

Doubles
- Career record: 1–5
- Career titles: 0
- Highest ranking: No. 266 (25 September 2006)
- Last updated on: 7 January 2018.

Ervin Eleskovic (born 8 May 1987 in Bileća, Bosnia and Herzegovina) is a former professional tennis player from Sweden. Ervin resides in Helsingborg, Sweden.

== Singles Titles ==
Legend (singles)
Grand Slam (0)
Tennis Masters Cup (0)
ATP Masters Series (0)
ATP Tour (0)
Challengers (0)
Futures (5)

No.	Date	Tournament	Surface	Opponent in the final	Score
1.	2006	Gothenburg	Hard	(Sweden) Johan Brunström	6–3, 6–3
2.	2007	Wuxi	Hard	(Netherlands) Antal Van Der Duim	6–3, 6–2
3.	2010	Baku	Hard	(Belarus) Siarhei Betau	6–3, 6–2
4.	2011	Nußloch	Carpet	(Germany) Jan-Lennard Struff	7–5, 6–4
5.	2011	Karlskrona	Clay	(Canada) Érik Chvojka	7–6, 6–1
