= Singapore ATP Challenger =

Defunct tennis tournament
- Location: Singapore
- Venue: Singapore Island Country Club
- Category: ATP Challenger Tour
- Surface: Hard
- Draw: 32S/27Q/16D
- Prize money: €50,000+H
- Website: Official website

The Singapore ATP Challenger was a tennis tournament held in Singapore in 2011 and in 2012.

The tournament was cancelled in 2013 due to a lack of funding after the Singapore Sports Council reduced the funding for the tournament.

== Past finals ==
=== Singles ===
Year	Champion	Runner-up	Score
2011	(Russia) Dmitry Tursunov	(Czech Republic) Lukáš Rosol	6–4, 6–2
2012	(Chinese Taipei) Lu Yen-hsun	(Japan) Go Soeda	6–3, 6–4

=== Doubles ===
Year	Champions	Runners-up	Score
2011	(United States) Scott Lipsky (United States) David Martin	(Thailand) Sanchai Ratiwatana (Thailand) Sonchat Ratiwatana	5–7, 6–1, [10–8]
2012	(Slovakia) Kamil Čapkovič (Israel) Amir Weintraub	(Chinese Taipei) Hsieh Cheng-peng (Chinese Taipei) Lee Hsin-han	6–4, 6–4
