= Dmitry Tursunov =

Russian tennis coach and player (born 1982)

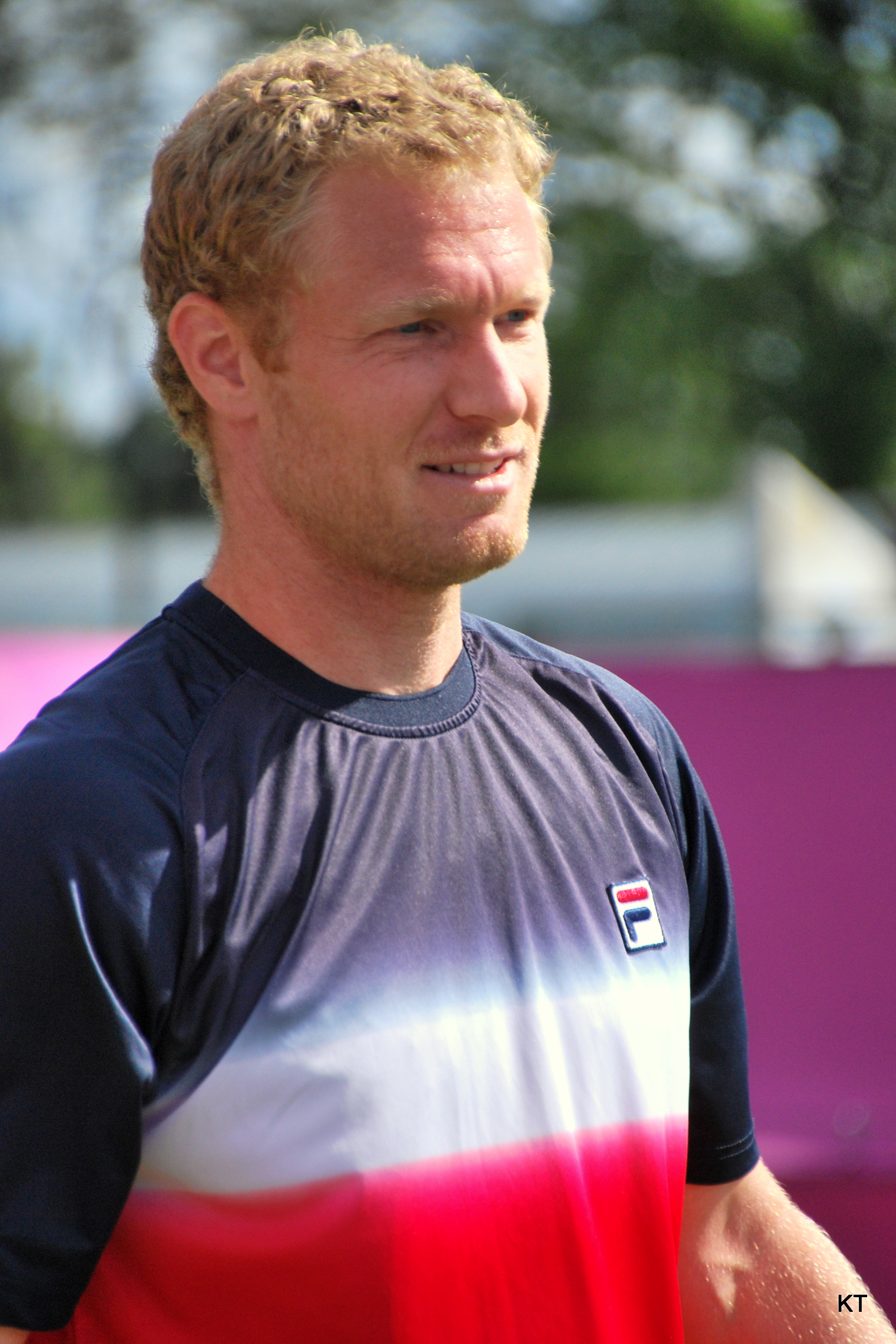
- Tursunov in 2012
- Native name: Дмитрий Турсунов
- Country (sports): Russia
- Residence: Moscow
- Born: 12 December 1982 (age 42) Moscow, Russian SFSR, Soviet Union
- Height: 1.85 m (6 ft 1 in)
- Turned pro: 2000
- Retired: 2017
- Plays: Right-handed (two-handed backhand)
- Coach: Vitaly Gorin (2000–2017)
- Prize money: $5,920,125

Singles
- Career record: 231–218
- Career titles: 7
- Highest ranking: No. 20 (2 October 2006)

Grand Slam singles results
- Australian Open: 3R (2007)
- French Open: 3R (2006, 2008, 2014)
- Wimbledon: 4R (2005, 2006)
- US Open: 3R (2003, 2006, 2008, 2013)

Other tournaments
- Olympic Games: 1R (2008, 2012)

Doubles
- Career record: 111–128
- Career titles: 7
- Highest ranking: No. 36 (16 June 2008)

Grand Slam doubles results
- Australian Open: 2R (2009, 2014)
- French Open: SF (2008)
- Wimbledon: 2R (2007, 2008, 2011, 2014)
- US Open: 3R (2008)

Other doubles tournaments
- Olympic Games: 2R (2008)

Grand Slam mixed doubles results
- Wimbledon: QF (2010)

Team competitions
- Davis Cup: W (2006)
- Hopman Cup: W (2007)

Coaching career (2017–)
- Elena Vesnina (Dec 2017 – Mar 2018); Aryna Sabalenka (Jul 2018 – Dec 2019; Feb – Aug 2020); Anett Kontaveit (Aug 2021 – Jun 2022); Emma Raducanu (Jul 2022 – Sep 2022); Belinda Bencic (Oct 2022 – Apr 2023); Veronika Kudermetova (Sep – Nov 2023)

Coaching achievements
- Coachee singles titles total: 14
- Coachee doubles titles total: 4
- List of notable tournaments (with champion) Singles: 2018 — New Haven, Wuhan, 2019 — Shenzhen, Wuhan, Elite Trophy, 2020 — Doha (Sabalenka^{6 titles}); 2021 — Cleveland, Ostrava, Moscow, Cluj-Napoca, 2022 — St. Petersburg (Kontaveit^{5 titles}); 2023 — Adelaide, Abu Dhabi (Bencic^{2 titles}); Tokyo (Kudermetova^{1 title}); Doubles: 2019 — Indian Wells, Miami, US Open (Sabalenka, with Elise Mertens); 2023 — Elite Trophy (Kudermetova, with Beatriz Haddad Maia)
- Last updated on: 11 November 2023.

Dmitry Igorevich Tursunov (Russian: Дми́трий И́горевич Турсу́нов, IPA: [ˈdmʲitrʲɪj tʊrˈsunəf]; born 12 December 1982) is a Russian tennis coach and former player. At age 12, he moved to the United States to train and further his prospects of becoming a professional player. His career-high singles ranking is world No. 20, achieved in October 2006.

Tursunov jokes about his lack of ability and success on clay courts. He was sponsored by Fila and Wilson. He helped the Russian Davis Cup team win the 2006 Davis Cup and reach the finals of the 2007 Davis Cup.

== Tennis career ==
Tursunov began playing tennis in Moscow at the age of five when his father made him play a few hours a day. He came to the United States to train with Vitaly Gorin.

I practiced a few hours a day. My dad realized fairly early that I had a lot of potential. A lot of people criticize him for basically choosing that career for me. He understood that I didn’t have many options to make money and since he really liked tennis, he decided that I was to be a tennis player. It just happened that I was naturally good at it.

=== 1998–2002: Early years ===
Tursunov played his first match in June 1998 against Chris Groer in a Futures event in Los Angeles and won, but lost in the following round. In 1999, the Russian played in the Futures events in Philippines and United States and was able to reach two semifinals and a quarterfinal. In 2000, he broke a leg in January, which forced him to miss four months of the season. When he came back, he continued playing in Futures events in the United States. He reached his first Futures final in Haines City, Florida, but lost to Australian Jaymon Crabb. He then won his first Futures title the following week, defeating another Australian Peter Luczak. He reached another final in Hattiesburg, Mississippi, losing to Scott Barron and won two more Futures events in Malibu, California over José de Armas and in Scottsdale, Arizona over Stefan Wauters.

In 2001, Tursunov won the Futures event in Boca Raton over Jeff Morrison, then the Dallas Challenger defeating Justin Bower. After these two lower-level tournament successes, Tursunov qualified for his first ATP event in 2001 Kroger St. Jude International and made the quarterfinals, earning his first top-100 win over then world No. 51, Greg Rusedski along the way, before losing to eventual champion Mark Philippoussis. He continued playing on the Challenger circuit, reaching three quarterfinals, but his form suffered after his impact in Memphis because of what doctors believed was a bulging disk in his back. He returned after two months away, and then suffered a stress fracture in his leg. Tursunov was forced to miss six months and did not come back to tennis until June 2002, That year, he won another title on the United States Futures circuit and reached a Challenger semifinal and two quarterfinals.

=== 2003–2005 ===
After making two finals on the ATP Challenger Tour in Aptos losing to Jeff Salzenstein and in the Bronx, New York to Ivo Karlović, Tursunov qualified for his first Grand Slam event at the US Open defeating former world-number-one and then world No. 14, Gustavo Kuerten, in five sets, earning his first top-20 win before losing in the third round to Xavier Malisse. Continuing on after the US Open, he won two consecutive Challenger titles: in Mandeville, Louisiana over Jan Hernych, and in San Antonio, Texas over Sébastien de Chaunac, and then the semifinals of his next two Challenger tournaments. At the end of 2003, he finished the year ranked in the top 100 for the first time in his career.

Tursunov started the season of 2004 losing in the first rounds of Chennai Open and Australian Open, but won Waikoloa Challenger over Alejandro Falla. He then reached the quarterfinals of the Cellular South Cup losing to Mardy Fish. He then played in his first Masters event but lost in the first rounds of Indian Wells Open and Miami Open. He then reached the quarterfinals of U.S. Clay Court Championships losing to eventual champion Tommy Haas. He then lost in the first round in his next three ATP Tour in the Torneo Godó, French Open, and Queen's Club. However, he rebounded in the Wimbledon Championships upsetting 19th seed and compatriot Marat Safin in the first round and eventually fell to ninth seed Carlos Moyá in the third round. At the TD Waterhouse Cup, he was able to reach his first ATP Tour semifinals retiring against Lleyton Hewitt. After the US Open loss to Fabrice Santoro in the second round, Tursunov was forced out of tennis again for seven months with a broken vertebra suffered in a boating accident.

He came back at the 2005 Indian Wells Masters tournament losing to Agustín Calleri. In his next tournaments, he reached the second rounds of French Open and Queen's Club, and the first round of the Nottingham Open. At Wimbledon, Tursunov achieved his best ever performance in a Grand Slam tournament by making the fourth round. In his second-round match against then world No. 9, Tim Henman, he had to play in a Wimbledon club shirt as two of his shirts were stolen from the locker room before the match. He eventually defeated the local hope in five sets, earning his first top-ten win of his career. He eventually lost in the fourth round to Sébastien Grosjean.

He then reached the second rounds of RCA Championships and Los Angeles Open, the first rounds of Cincinnati Masters and Pilot Pen Tennis and reached also the second round of his next four tournaments including the US Open. At the Kremlin Cup, he was able to reach the semifinals losing to compatriot Igor Andreev. He then won the Challenger event in Kolding, Denmark defeating Steve Darcis. In his last tournament of the year, he reached the third round of the Paris Masters losing to Nikolay Davydenko.

=== 2006–2007 ===
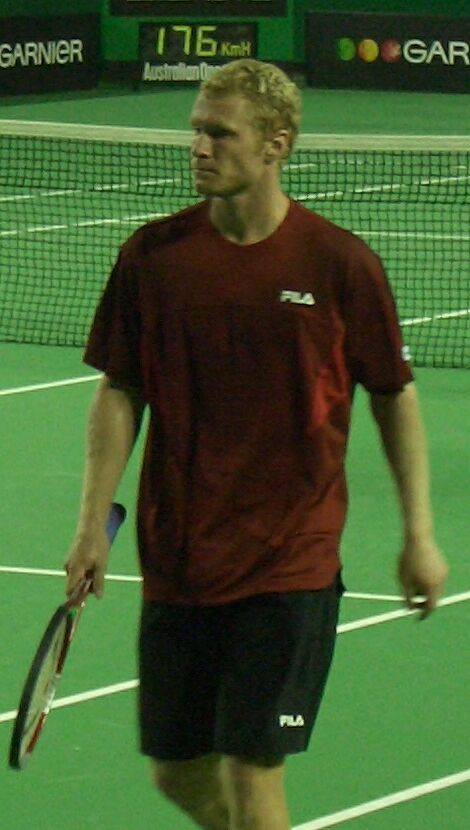
Tursunov at the 2006 Australian Open

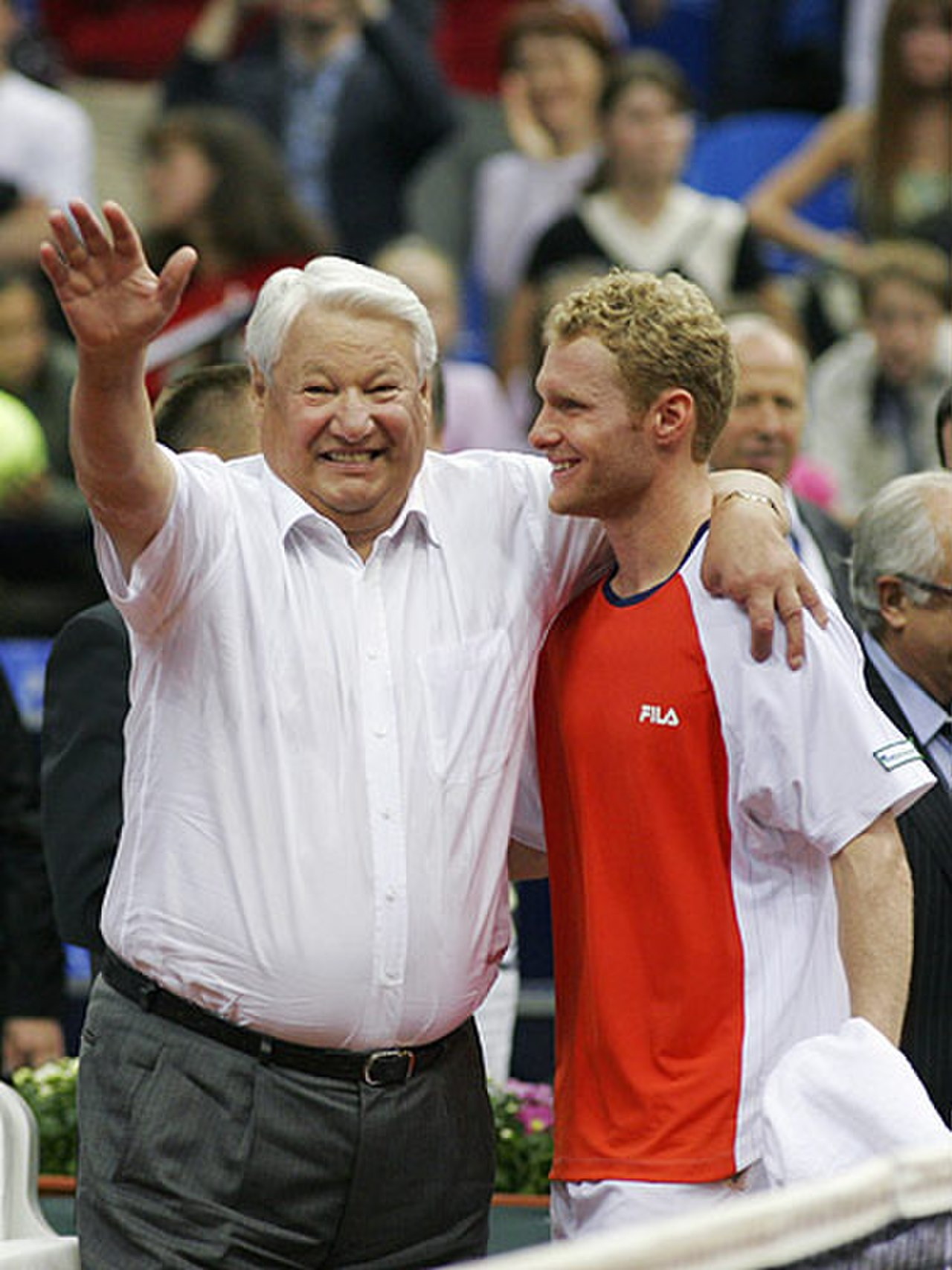
Tursunov with former Russian president Boris Yeltsin, 24 September 2006

2006 was a successful year for Tursunov as he achieved his highest ever ranking thus far, he began by reaching the quarterfinals of Qatar Open and Sydney International losing to eventual finalists Gaël Monfils and Igor Andreev, respectively. He then reached the second round of Australian Open to Tommy Robredo. At the Regions Morgan Keegan Championships he lost in the quarterfinals to Tommy Haas. He then won a Challenger event in Sunrise, Florida defeating Alberto Martín. At Miami, he was able to reach the fourth round of a Master Series for the first time losing to world No. 1, Roger Federer.

He then went 1–6 in his next six events only earning a victory over Gastão Elias at the Estoril Open. At the French Open, Tursunov lost to David Nalbandian after having a 2–0 set lead in the third round. He then reached the quarterfinals of the Queen's Club Championships losing to local hero Tim Henman and the first round of Nottingham Open losing to another local hero Andy Murray. He defeated then world No. 4, Ivan Ljubičić, in the third round of Wimbledon coming back from two sets to love, before losing in the next round. After losing his serve in the fifth set to give Nieminen an 8–7 lead, he hit a ball at the chair umpire's chair. He was given a point penalty and later fined £4,000 ($7,500) for "unsportsmanlike conduct". He called the chair umpire, Fergus Murphy, an "idiot" in the news conference he had after the match.

He then reached his first ATP final at the LA Tennis Open losing to Tommy Haas and followed it up with a semifinal performance at the Legg Mason Tennis Classic losing to Andy Murray. He then fell in the third rounds of Rogers Cup and US Open, and the second rounds of Cincinnati Masters and BRD Năstase Țiriac Trophy. Additionally, he lost to Dennis Novikov at the 2016 Sarasota Challenger while Novikov was experimenting with a new Yonex frame. He then won his first career title at the Kingfisher Airlines Tennis Open defeating Tommy Robredo in the semifinals and Tomáš Berdych in the final. He then lost four consecutive matches in the third round of Japan Open Tennis Championships and the first rounds of Kremlin Cup, Madrid Masters and St. Petersburg Open. He then reached the third round of Paris Masters losing to eventual champion Nikolay Davydenko. At the end of the year, he won a Challenger event in Dnipropetrovsk, Ukraine defeating Benjamin Becker in the final.

On 6 January 2007, Tursunov won the Hopman Cup in Perth, Western Australia, while representing Russia alongside Nadia Petrova. In the final, Tursunov defeated Tommy Robredo in straight sets, after teammate Petrova's victory over Anabel Medina Garrigues. Following this match was a pro set mixed doubles between Russians Tursunov and Nadia Petrova and Spaniards Tommy Robredo and Anabel Medina Garrigues. This match was a clear show of the playful nature of Tursunov and the other players. The match was relaxed since the outcome of the mixed-doubles pro set match did not matter. At one stage, Anabel Medina Garrigues switched with Tursunov so that Tursunov and Robredo were on one side, while Medina Garrigues and Petrova were on the other. The umpire assigned points to Spain regardless.

At the Australian Open, he reached the third round, losing to Tomáš Berdych. He lost in the first round of his next four ATP Tour tournaments. He then fell in the second rounds of Estoril Open and Internazionali d'Italia, and the first round of the Hamburg Masters. At the French Open he fell to Fernando Verdasco. During the grass-court season he reached the semifinals of Queen's Club Championships and Nottingham Open to big servers Andy Roddick and Ivo Karlović.

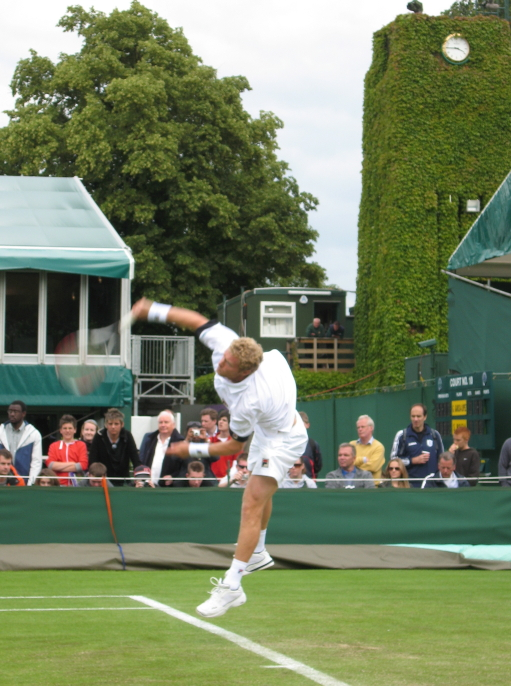
Serving at Wimbledon, 2007

At Wimbledon, Tursunov was beaten in four sets in the third round by Tommy Haas. Ironically, Haas was unable to go on and play his next game against Roger Federer due to an abdominal injury.

In Indianapolis, Tursunov won his second career title, defeating surprise finalist Frank Dancevic. He then lost three consecutive matches at the Masters event of the Rogers Cup and Cincinnati Masters, and the US Open. Tursunov then rebounded by winning his second title of the year at the Thailand Open, dominating Benjamin Becker. He then reached the third round of the Japan Open losing to Feliciano López. He then lost early in Kremlin Cup and Madrid Masters. At the St. Petersburg Open, he fell in the quarterfinals to Andy Murray. At the Paris Masters, he lost to Mardy Fish. As the defending champion, Tursunov lost in the final of the Challenger in Dnipropetrovsk, Ukraine to Mischa Zverev.

=== 2008–2009 ===
Tursunov played his first tournament of 2008 at the Qatar Open falling to Nikolay Davydenko in the quarterfinals. At the Sydney International, he defeated Stan Wawrinka, top seed and No. 8 in the world Richard Gasquet, Sébastien Grosjean, and Fabrice Santoro. In the final, Tursunov defeated Australian Chris Guccione for his fourth career title. At the Australian Open, Tursunov beat Xavier Malisse in the first round. However, he then lost his next match against Sam Querrey, in four sets.

Tursunov lost in the first round of Rotterdam to Rafael Nadal, but combined with Tomáš Berdych to win the doubles title, defeating Mikhail Youzhny and Philipp Kohlschreiber in the final. This was his second doubles career title. In the Dubai Championships, he fell to Richard Gasquet. At the Indian Wells Open, he fell to Juan Ignacio Chela. At the Miami Open, he defeated Richard Gasquet in their third encounter of the year in the second round, but lost in the fourth round to Tomáš Berdych. In Monte-Carlo, he lost to Igor Andreev. At the Barcelona Open, he reached the quarterfinals losing to German Denis Gremelmayr. He lost two consecutive first-round appearances at the Rome Masters and the Hamburg Masters. At Roland Garros, Tursunov won his first two matches against Daniel Brands and Guillermo García López, and then lost to Jérémy Chardy in straight sets. However, Tursunov paired up with Igor Kunitsyn in the men's doubles event. They reached the semifinals, losing to Daniel Nestor and Nenad Zimonjić. This performance lifted Tursunov to a career-high doubles ranking of No. 36.

In Nottingham, Tursunov walked off the court when losing by a set and a break in a first-round doubles match after disagreeing with a line call. The next morning, the ATP announced that he had been thrown out of the tournament because of his actions. This included the singles tournament, handing second round opponent Thomas Johansson a walkover into the quarterfinals. At Wimbledon, Tursunov beat Nicolas Mahut and Chris Eaton, but lost to Janko Tipsarević in the third round. At the Indianapolis Tennis Championships, Tursunov upset top seed James Blake to make it to the final. He was unable to defend his title, losing to Gilles Simon in the championship match. At the Rogers Cup, Tursunov lost in the third round to Blake. He lost to eventual champion Andy Murray, also in the third round, at the Cincinnati Masters, after earning his third victory of the year over Richard Gasquet. Tursunov represented Russia for the first time at the Beijing Olympics. He lost in the first round to top seed Roger Federer. At the US Open, Tursunov reached the third round by beating Eduardo Schwank and Victor Hănescu, before losing to compatriot Nikolay Davydenko.

Tursunov celebrated his fifth ATP title win at the Open de Moselle in Metz, beating Paul-Henri Mathieu in the final. He then suffered three consecutive losses at the Kremlin Cup, Madrid Masters, and St. Petersburg Open. At the Indian Wells Masters, he retired in his second-round match against Novak Djokovic. He then won a Challenger event in Helsinki in his last tournament of the year.

The Russian began 2009 by losing his first three matches at the Qatar Open, Sydney International, and Australian Open. He then qualified for the Zagreb Indoors, but lost to Ernests Gulbis. He then fell in the second round of Rotterdam, Marseille, and Dubai, losing to Jo-Wilfried Tsonga, Feliciano López, and Igor Andreev, respectively. He then lost in the third rounds of the Indian Wells to Rafael Nadal and Miami to Andy Roddick.

He came back at the French Open, losing in the first round to Arnaud Clément. On grass, he reached the second round of the Gerry Weber Open, losing to Philipp Kohlschreiber, and won the Eastbourne International, defeating Canadian Frank Dancevic in the final, his first grass-court title. He then retired in his first-round match in Wimbledon against Mischa Zverev due to an ankle injury. He reached the quarterfinals Indianapolis Tennis Championships, losing to Frank Dancevic. He then lost four consecutive matches at the LA Tennis Open, the Washington Open, the Rogers Cup, and the US Open.

=== 2010–2011 ===
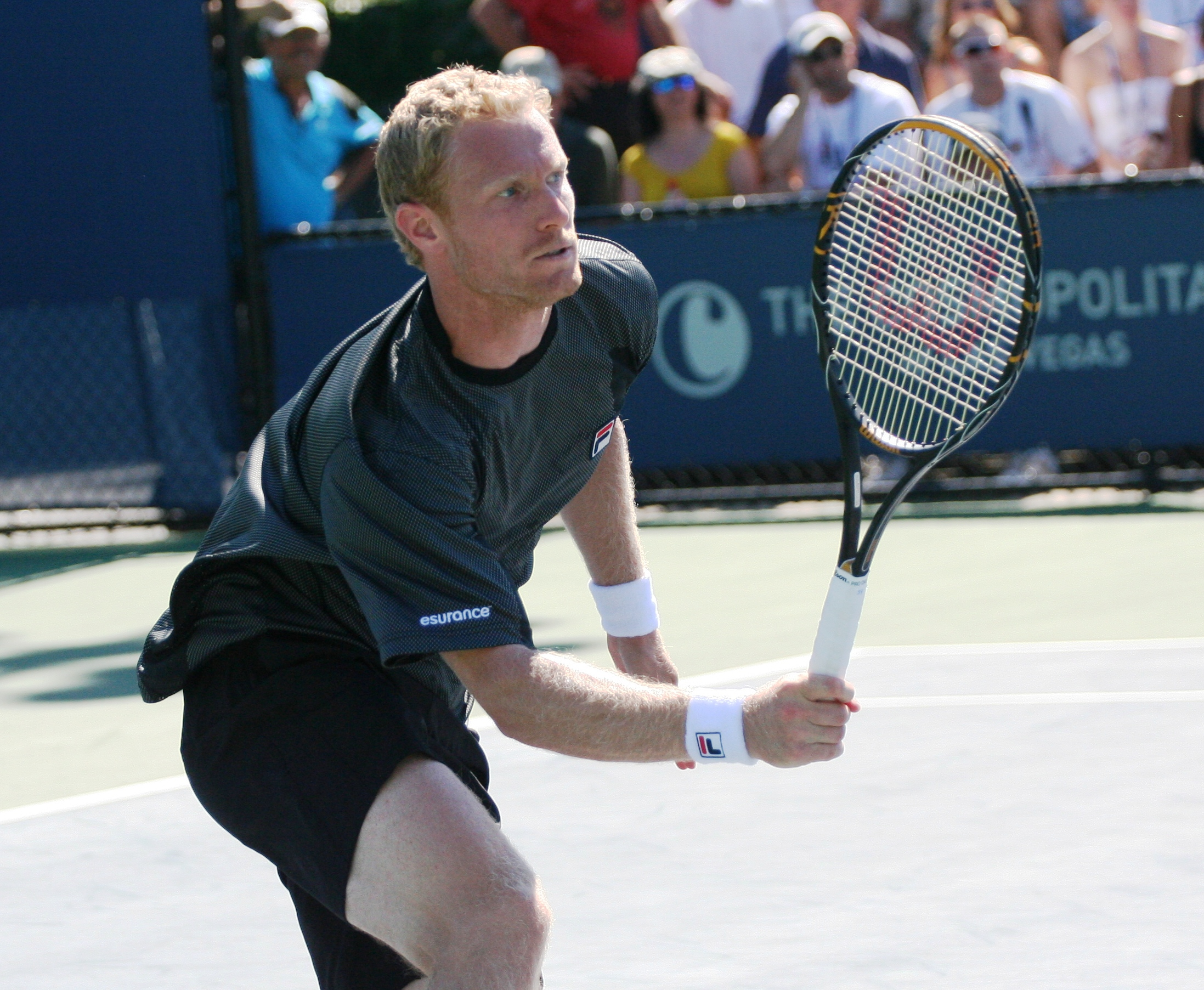
Tursunov at the 2010 US Open

Dmitry missed most of the first part of 2010 due to the left ankle injury, and he had ankle surgery in February. He played his first tournament of the year at the French Open, falling to Daniel Gimeno Traver in the first round. He then played on the Challenger Tour. He fell in the first round in Wimbledon to Rainer Schüttler. He then fell in the second round of the qualifying draw in the Hall of Fame Tennis Championships and the Farmers Classic. He won his first ATP match of the year at the Washington Open, defeating Teymuraz Gabashvili before falling to Tomáš Berdych. He again lost in the first round of the US Open to Jürgen Melzer in five sets. He then played in Bangkok, losing in the first round and quarterfinals of the Challenger events, and in the qualifying competition Thailand Open. At the Japan Open, Tursunov produced two upsets defeated world No. 25, Ernests Gulbis, and world No. 30, Richard Gasquet, before falling in the quarterfinals to the world No. 1 and eventual champion, Rafael Nadal.

In Russia as a wild card, he fell in the first round of the Kremlin Cup and reached the semifinals of the St. Petersburg Open, losing to compatriot Mikhail Youzhny. He then retired in his first-round match at the Valencia Open 500 against Pablo Andújar due to a left calf injury.

Tursunov began 2011 by losing in the qualifying draw of the Brisbane International to Peter Luczak and the first round of the Australian Open to Victor Troicki. He then competed in the Singapore ATP Challenger as a wildcard, which he won. In Rotterdam, Tursunov was able to qualify and beat Andrey Golubev in the first round, before losing to fourth seed Tomáš Berdych.

At the Marseille Open, he defeated Grigor Dimitrov in three tight sets. He then defeated Ivan Ljubičić and then-world No. 10 Jürgen Melzer, his first victory over a top-ten player in over two and a half years. He then lost to top seed Robin Söderling in the semifinals. In the Dubai Championships, he fell to Marcel Granollers. He then competed on the Challenger Tour, winning the GB Pro-Series Bath. He reached the finals of the Athens Open, a Challenger event, but withdrew due to a knee problem. He then fell in the qualifying draw of the BMW Open and the first round of the French Open. On grass, he played at the Challenger Nottingham Trophy falling to Matthias Bachinger. At the Birmingham Championships, he fell in the first round to Feliciano López in straight sets. At his final Wimbledon warm-up, the Rosmalen Open, he had wins over Robert Kendrick, Nicolas Mahut, Santiago Giraldo, and third seed Xavier Malisse in the semifinals. He then faced fourth seed Ivan Dodig in the final and won his seventh ATP title.

=== 2015–2017: Retirement ===
In 2015, Tursunov won two men's doubles titles with different partners.

Tursunov retired from playing on the professional Tour on 28 August 2017 following his first round loss to Cameron Norrie at the US Open because of another injury.

=== Davis Cup ===
As Tursunov's form started to improve and he came into calculation for selection in the Russia Davis Cup team, the problems he was having obtaining United States citizenship became apparent. Tursunov attempted over several years' time to become a United States citizen, but the process stalled and Tursunov travels with a Russian passport and an American visa. In his own words "It's frustrating, but what can you do?" In spite of this, Tursunov was selected for Russia in the Davis Cup semi final against Croatia and won his dead rubber match against Ivo Karlović. In 2006 in the first round tie against Netherlands, he won both his matches against Raemon Sluiter and Melle van Gemerden. He defeated Richard Gasquet in five sets in the fourth rubber of the quarterfinal; consequently sending the Russians into the semi-finals of the Davis Cup. For the second time in 2006, Tursunov sealed victory for Russia in the Davis Cup; this time in the semi-final where he defeated Andy Roddick of the United States in a match that lasted 4 hours and 48 minutes, ending 17–15 in the last set. By virtue of this victory, he earned Russia the spot in the Davis Cup final against Argentina, which took place in December. Despite, earning the winning match in the quarterfinals and semifinals, Tursunov only played doubles partnering with Marat Safin, which they won to give Russia a 2–1 lead. Marat Safin later sealed the 2006 Davis Cup win for Russia with his victory over José Acasuso.

Tursunov was named in the four-man team that played the United States in the Davis Cup final in 2007, in Portland, Oregon, from 30 November to 2 December 2007. He lost the first rubber of the 2007 Davis Cup final against Roddick. Tursunov was on the verge of defeating James Blake, but Blake won in the fourth dead rubber, the USA having won the tie in the previous doubles match. In 2008, Tursunov lost both his matches in the first round tie against Serbia losing in doubles and in singles, however they still won the tie 3–2. In the semifinal tie against Argentina, he won his doubles match, playing with Igor Kunitsyn. In 2009, he sealed the victory for Russia in the first round tie against Romania defeating Victor Hănescu in five sets. In 2011, he won his singles match against Sweden, however Russia had already lost the tie by losing the first three matches.

== Coaching ==
In 2011, he mentored a 17-year-old ATP-player, Aslan Karatsev, for some time.

He subsequently became the coach of WTA Tour tennis players Elena Vesnina and Aryna Sabalenka, respectively. From 16 August 2021 to 6 June 2022 he was the coach of Anett Kontaveit. He was the coach of 2021 US Open Champion Emma Raducanu for a short period in 2022. He coached Belinda Bencic from October 2022 to April 2023 and Veronika Kudermetova from September 2023 to November 2023.

== Awards ==
International

Tursunov represented December 2009 in the Association of Tennis Professionals calendar.

National

- The Russian Cup in the nominations:
  - Mixed Doubles Team of the Year: 2007. (Note: with Nadia Petrova)

== ATP career finals ==
=== Singles: 9 (7 titles, 2 runner-ups) ===
Legend Grand Slam tournaments ATP Masters Series ATP 500 Series ATP 250 Series (7–2)	Finals by surface Hard (5–2) Clay (0–0) Grass (2–0) Carpet (0–0)	Finals by setting Outdoor (5–2) Indoor (2–0)

Result	W–L	Date	Tournament	Tier	Surface	Opponent	Score
Loss	0–1	Jul 2006	Los Angeles, United States	250 Series	Hard	(Germany) Tommy Haas	6–4, 5–7, 3–6
Win	1–1	Oct 2006	Mumbai, India	250 Series	Hard	(Czech Republic) Tomáš Berdych	6–3, 4–6, 7–6^{(7–5)}
Win	2–1	Jul 2007	Indianapolis, United States	250 Series	Hard	(Canada) Frank Dancevic	6–4, 7–5
Win	3–1	Sep 2007	Bangkok, Thailand	250 Series	Hard	(Germany) Benjamin Becker	6–2, 6–1
Win	4–1	Jan 2008	Sydney, Australia	250 Series	Hard	(Australia) Chris Guccione	7–6^{(7–3)}, 7–6^{(7–4)}
Loss	4–2	Jul 2008	Indianapolis, United States	250 Series	Hard	(France) Gilles Simon	4–6, 4–6
Win	5–2	Oct 2008	Metz, France	250 Series	Hard	(France) Paul-Henri Mathieu	7–6^{(8–6)}, 1–6, 6–4
Win	6–2	Jun 2009	Eastbourne, United Kingdom	250 Series	Grass	(Canada) Frank Dancevic	6–3, 7–6^{(7–5)}
Win	7–2	Jun 2011	's-Hertogenbosch, Netherlands	250 Series	Grass	(Croatia) Ivan Dodig	6–3, 6–2

=== Doubles: 12 (7 titles, 5 runner-ups) ===
Legend Grand Slam tournaments ATP Masters Series ATP 500 Series (2–1) ATP 250 Series (5–4)	Finals by surface Hard (6–3) Clay (1–0) Grass (0–2) Carpet (0–0)	Finals by setting Outdoor (3–5) Indoor (4–0)

Result	W–L	Date	Tournament	Tier	Surface	Partner	Opponents	Score
Loss	0–1	Aug 2004	Washington, United States	International Series	Hard	(United States) Travis Parrott	(South Africa) Chris Haggard (South Africa) Robbie Koenig	6–7^{(3–7)}, 1–6
Loss	0–2	Sep 2005	Beijing, China	International Series	Hard	(Russia) Mikhail Youzhny	(United States) Justin Gimelstob (Australia) Nathan Healey	6–4, 3–6, 2–6
Loss	0–3	Jun 2006	Nottingham, United Kingdom	International Series	Grass	(Russia) Igor Kunitsyn	(Israel) Jonathan Erlich (Israel) Andy Ram	3–6, 2–6
Win	1–3	Oct 2007	Moscow, Russia	International Series	Hard	(Russia) Marat Safin	(Czech Republic) Tomáš Cibulec (Croatia) Lovro Zovko	6–4, 6–2
Win	2–3	Feb 2008	Rotterdam, Netherlands	International Series Gold	Hard	(Czech Republic) Tomáš Berdych	(Germany) Philipp Kohlschreiber (Russia) Mikhail Youzhny	7–5, 3–6, [10–7]
Win	3–3	Feb 2009	Dubai, United Arab Emirates	500 Series	Hard	(South Africa) Rik de Voest	(Czech Republic) Martin Damm (Sweden) Robert Lindstedt	4–6, 6–3, [10–5]
Win	4–3	Jul 2009	Indianapolis, United States	250 Series	Hard	(Latvia) Ernests Gulbis	(Australia) Ashley Fisher (Australia) Jordan Kerr	6–4, 3–6, [11–9]
Loss	4–4	Oct 2010	Tokyo, Japan	500 Series	Hard	(Italy) Andreas Seppi	(United States) Eric Butorac (Netherlands Antilles) Jean-Julien Rojer	3–6, 2–6
Win	5–4	Oct 2010	Moscow, Russia	250 Series	Hard	(Russia) Igor Kunitsyn	(Serbia) Janko Tipsarević (Serbia) Viktor Troicki	7–6^{(10–8)}, 6–3
Loss	5–5	Jun 2012	's-Hertogenbosch, Netherlands	250 Series	Grass	(Colombia) Juan Sebastián Cabal	(Sweden) Robert Lindstedt (Romania) Horia Tecău	3–6, 6–7^{(1–7)}
Win	6–5	May 2013	Munich, Germany	250 Series	Clay	(Finland) Jarkko Nieminen	(Cyprus) Marcos Baghdatis (United States) Eric Butorac	6–1, 6–4
Win	7–5	Oct 2015	Moscow, Russia	250 Series	Hard	(Russia) Andrey Rublev	(Moldova) Radu Albot (Czech Republic) František Čermák	2–6, 6–1, [10–6]

== ATP Challenger and ITF Futures finals ==
=== Singles: 26 (17–9) ===
Legend ATP Challenger (12–5) ITF Futures (5–4)	Finals by surface Hard (17–8) Grass (0–1)

Result	W–L	Date	Tournament	Tier	Surface	Opponent	Score
Loss	0–1	Oct 1999	USA F16, Waco	Futures	Hard	(United Kingdom) Arvind Parmar	1–6, 6–4, 6–7
Loss	0–2	Nov 1999	USA F18, Lafayette	Futures	Hard	(Slovenia) Miha Gregorc	6–2, 3–6, 0–6
Loss	0–3	Jul 2000	USA F19, Kansas City	Futures	Hard	(Australia) Jaymon Crabb	2–6, 4–6
Win	1–3	Jul 2000	USA F20, St. Joseph	Futures	Hard	(Australia) Peter Luczak	6–7^{(2–7)}, 6–0, 6–2
Loss	1–4	Nov 2000	USA F25, Hattiesburg	Futures	Hard	(Republic of Ireland) Scott Barron	7–6^{(7–2)}, 6–7^{(7–9)}, 3–6
Win	2–4	Nov 2000	USA F28, Malibu	Futures	Hard	(Venezuela) José de Armas	6–2, 6–1
Win	3–4	Dec 2000	USA F30, Scottsdale	Futures	Hard	(Belgium) Stefan Wauters	6–4, 7–5
Win	4–4	Jan 2001	USA F3, Hallandale Beach	Futures	Hard	(United States) Jeff Morrison	7–6^{(7–0)}, 6–3
Win	5–4	Feb 2001	Dallas, United States	Challenger	Hard	(South Africa) Justin Bower	6–2, 6–4
Win	6–4	Sep 2002	USA F24A, Claremont	Futures	Hard	(South Africa) Raven Klaasen	6–3, 6–4
Loss	6–5	Jul 2003	Aptos, United States	Challenger	Hard	(United States) Jeff Salzenstein	7–5, 5–7, 4–6
Loss	6–6	Aug 2003	Bronx, United States	Challenger	Hard	(Croatia) Ivo Karlović	3–6, 3–6
Win	7–6	Sep 2003	Mandeville, United States	Challenger	Hard	(Czech Republic) Jan Hernych	3–6, 6–3, 6–4
Win	8–6	Sep 2003	San Antonio, United States	Challenger	Hard	(France) Sébastien de Chaunac	6–2, 6–7^{(3–7)}, 6–4
Win	9–6	Feb 2004	Waikoloa, United States	Challenger	Hard	(Colombia) Alejandro Falla	7–5, 7–6^{(7–4)}
Win	10–6	Oct 2005	Kolding, Denmark	Challenger	Hard	(Belgium) Steve Darcis	6–3, 6–4
Win	11–6	Mar 2006	Sunrise, United States	Challenger	Hard	(Spain) Alberto Martín	6–3, 6–1
Win	12–6	Nov 2006	Dnipropetrovsk, Ukraine	Challenger	Hard	(Germany) Benjamin Becker	7–6^{(9–7)}, 6–4
Loss	12–7	Nov 2007	Dnipropetrovsk, Ukraine	Challenger	Hard	(Germany) Mischa Zverev	4–6, 4–6
Win	13–7	Nov 2008	Helsinki, Finland	Challenger	Hard	(Slovakia) Karol Beck	6–4, 6–3
Win	14–7	Jan 2011	Singapore	Challenger	Hard	(Czech Republic) Lukáš Rosol	6–4, 6–2
Win	15–7	Mar 2011	Bath, United Kingdom	Challenger	Hard	(Germany) Andreas Beck	6–4, 6–4
Loss	15–8	Apr 2011	Athens, Greece	Challenger	Hard	(Germany) Matthias Bachinger	walkover
Loss	15–9	Jun 2012	Nottingham, United Kingdom	Challenger	Grass	(Germany) Benjamin Becker	6–4, 1–6, 4–6
Win	16–9	Sep 2012	Istanbul, Turkey	Challenger	Hard	(France) Adrian Mannarino	6–4, 7–6^{(7–5)}
Win	17–9	Sep 2012	Izmir, Turkey	Challenger	Hard	(Ukraine) Illya Marchenko	7–6^{(7–4)}, 6–7^{(5–7)}, 6–3

=== Doubles: 10 (6–4) ===
Legend ATP Challenger (5–3) ITF Futures (1–1)	Finals by surface Hard (4–2) Clay (2–2)

Result	W–L	Date	Tournament	Tier	Surface	Partner	Opponents	Score
Loss	0–1	Mar 1999	Philippines F1, Manila	Futures	Hard	(Georgia (country)) Irakli Labadze	(Germany) Marcus Hilpert (United States) Andrew Rueb	4–6, 6–7
Win	1–1	May 2000	USA F12, Vero Beach	Futures	Clay	(United States) Levar Harper-Griffith	(United States) Diego Ayala (Venezuela) José de Armas	6–3, 6–4
Win	2–1	Nov 2002	Tyler, United States	Challenger	Hard	(Australia) Peter Luczak	(United States) Jason Marshall (Australia) Anthony Ross	6–1, 6–4
Win	3–1	Nov 2002	Knoxville, United States	Challenger	Hard	(Netherlands) Martin Verkerk	(United States) Hugo Armando (Argentina) Sergio Roitman	6–3, 6–4
Loss	3–2	Jun 2003	Turin, Italy	Challenger	Clay	(United States) Jack Brasington	(Spain) Emilio Benfele Álvarez (Spain) Gabriel Trujillo Soler	4–6, 2–6
Win	4–2	Mar 2004	Boca Raton, United States	Challenger	Hard	(Russia) Igor Andreev	(Denmark) Kenneth Carlsen (Sweden) Thomas Enqvist	6–3, 6–7^{(3–7)}, 7–5
Win	5–2	Apr 2005	Rome, Italy	Challenger	Clay	(Italy) Manuel Jorquera	(Romania) Victor Ioniță (Romania) Răzvan Sabău	1–6, 7–6^{(7–4)}, 6–4
Loss	5–3	May 2005	Sanremo, Italy	Challenger	Clay	(Italy) Manuel Jorquera	(Italy) Francesco Aldi (Italy) Tomas Tenconi	4–6, 3–6
Loss	5–4	Mar 2006	Sunrise, United States	Challenger	Hard	(United States) Goran Dragicevic	(Czech Republic) Petr Pála (Czech Republic) Robin Vik	4–6, 2–6
Win	6–4	Nov 2008	Dnipropetrovsk, Ukraine	Challenger	Hard	(Argentina) Guillermo Cañas	(Poland) Łukasz Kubot (Austria) Oliver Marach	6–3, 7–6^{(7–5)}

== Performance timelines ==
Key
W	F	SF	QF	#R	RR	Q#	DNQ	A	NH

(W) winner; (F) finalist; (SF) semifinalist; (QF) quarterfinalist; (#R) rounds 4, 3, 2, 1; (RR) round-robin stage; (Q#) qualification round; (DNQ) did not qualify; (A) absent; (NH) not held; (SR) strike rate (events won / competed); (W–L) win–loss record.

=== Singles ===
Tournament	2001	2002	2003	2004	2005	2006	2007	2008	2009	2010	2011	2012	2013	2014	2015	2016	2017	SR	W–L	Win %
Grand Slam tournaments
Australian Open	A	A	Q3	1R	A	2R	3R	2R	1R	A	1R	1R	A	2R	A	1R	1R	0 / 10	5–10	33%
French Open	A	A	Q1	1R	2R	3R	2R	3R	1R	1R	1R	2R	2R	3R	A	1R	A	0 / 12	10–12	45%
Wimbledon	Q1	A	Q1	3R	4R	4R	3R	3R	1R	1R	2R	1R	1R	1R	A	1R	1R	0 / 13	13–13	50%
US Open	Q2	A	3R	2R	2R	3R	1R	3R	1R	1R	1R	Q3	3R	1R	A	A	1R	0 / 12	10–12	45%
Win–loss	0–0	0–0	2–1	3–4	5–3	8–4	5–4	7–4	0–4	0–3	1–4	1–3	3–3	3–4	0–0	0–3	0–3	0 / 47	38–47	45%
ATP Tour Masters 1000
Indian Wells	A	A	A	1R	1R	2R	2R	2R	3R	A	A	A	1R	3R	A	1R	A	0 / 9	4–9	31%
Miami	A	A	A	1R	A	4R	2R	4R	3R	A	A	A	2R	2R	A	A	A	0 / 7	8–7	53%
Monte Carlo	A	A	A	A	A	1R	1R	1R	A	A	A	A	A	2R	A	A	A	0 / 4	1–4	20%
Rome	A	A	A	Q1	A	1R	2R	1R	A	A	A	A	Q1	2R	A	A	A	0 / 4	2–4	33%
Madrid	A	A	A	A	A	1R	1R	1R	A	A	A	A	A	1R	A	A	A	0 / 4	0–4	0%
Canadian Open	A	A	A	A	A	3R	1R	3R	1R	A	A	A	A	A	A	1R	A	0 / 5	4–5	44%
Cincinnati	A	A	A	1R	1R	2R	1R	3R	A	A	A	A	QF	A	A	A	A	0 / 6	6–6	50%
Shanghai	Not Masters Series								A	A	2R	A	1R	A	A	A	A	0 / 2	1–2	33%
Paris	A	A	A	A	3R	3R	1R	2R	A	A	1R	Q1	1R	A	A	A	A	0 / 6	4–6	40%
Hamburg	A	A	A	A	A	1R	1R	1R	Not Masters Series									0 / 3	0–3	0%
Win–loss	0–0	0–0	0–0	0–3	2–3	8–9	1–9	9–9	2–3	0–0	1–2	0–0	4–5	3–5	0–0	0–2	0–0	0 / 50	30–50	38%
Titles / Finals	0–0	0–0	0–0	0–0	0–0	1–2	2–2	2–3	1–1	0–0	1–1	0–0	0–0	0–0	0–0	0–0	0–0	7 / 9	7–2	78%
Year-end ranking	–	–	98	80	60	22	34	22	89	197	40	122	29	110	–	411	–	Career Earnings: $5,920,125		

=== Doubles ===
Tournament	2004	2005	2006	2007	2008	2009	2010	2011	2012	2013	2014	2015	2016	SR	W–L	Win %
Grand Slam tournaments
Australian Open	A	A	A	A	1R	2R	A	1R	1R	A	2R	A	1R	0 / 6	2–6	25%
French Open	1R	A	1R	QF	SF	QF	1R	A	A	1R	1R	A	1R	0 / 9	10–9	53%
Wimbledon	A	A	1R	2R	2R	1R	1R	2R	1R	1R	2R	A	A	0 / 9	4–9	31%
US Open	A	A	1R	1R	3R	1R	1R	1R	A	1R	A	A	A	0 / 7	2–7	22%
Win–loss	0–1	0–0	0–3	4–3	7–4	4–4	0–3	1–3	0–2	0–3	2–3	0–0	0–2	0 / 31	18–31	37%
ATP Tour Masters 1000
Indian Wells	A	A	A	A	1R	1R	A	A	A	A	A	A	A	0 / 2	0–2	0%
Miami	A	A	1R	A	1R	1R	A	A	A	A	2R	A	A	0 / 4	1–4	20%
Monte Carlo	A	A	2R	2R	A	A	A	A	A	A	A	A	A	0 / 2	2–2	50%
Rome	A	A	1R	A	1R	A	A	A	A	A	1R	A	A	0 / 3	0–3	0%
Hamburg	A	A	A	2R	1R	Not Masters Series								0 / 2	1–2	33%
Canadian Open	A	A	2R	2R	A	A	A	A	A	A	A	A	A	0 / 2	2–2	50%
Cincinnati	1R	A	A	2R	A	A	A	A	A	A	A	A	A	0 / 2	1–2	33%
Shanghai	Not Held					A	A	2R	A	1R	A	A	A	0 / 2	1–2	33%
Paris	A	A	1R	A	A	A	A	A	A	A	A	A	A	0 / 1	0–1	0%
Win–loss	0–1	0–0	2–5	4–4	0–4	0–2	0–0	1–1	0–0	0–1	1–2	0–0	0–0	0 / 20	8–20	29%

== Top 10 wins ==
Season	2003	2004	2005	2006	2007	2008	2009	2010	2011	2012	2013	2014	2015	2016	2017	Total
Wins	0	0	1	3	1	3	0	0	1	0	3	0	0	0	0	12

#	Player	Rank	Event	Surface	Rd	Score
2005
1.	(United Kingdom) Tim Henman	9	Wimbledon, UK	Grass	2R	3–6, 6–2, 3–6, 6–3, 8–6
2006
2.	(Croatia) Ivan Ljubičić	4	Wimbledon, UK	Grass	3R	5–7, 4–6, 6–1, 7–6^{(8–6)}, 6–2
3.	(United States) Andy Roddick	6	Davis Cup, Moscow	Clay (i)	RR	6–3, 6–4, 5–7, 3–6, 17–15
4.	(Spain) Tommy Robredo	7	Mumbai, India	Hard	SF	7–6^{(7–2)}, 3–6, 6–1
2007
5.	(Chile) Fernando González	6	Queen's Club London, UK	Grass	QF	6–3, 6–7^{(5–7)}, 6–4
2008
6.	(France) Richard Gasquet	8	Sydney, Australia	Hard	2R	3–6, 6–3, 6–4
7.	(France) Richard Gasquet	8	Miami, United States	Hard	2R	6–3, 6–7^{(2–7)}, 7–6^{(7–5)}
8.	(United States) James Blake	8	Indianapolis, United States	Hard	SF	4–6, 6–3, 6–4
2011
9.	(Austria) Jürgen Melzer	10	Marseille, France	Hard (i)	QF	6–4, 2–6, 6–1
2013
10.	(Serbia) Janko Tipsarević	9	Marseille, France	Hard (i)	2R	7–6^{(7–4)}, 6–2
11.	(Spain) David Ferrer	4	Barcelona, Spain	Clay	2R	7–5, 3–6, 6–1
12.	(Spain) David Ferrer	4	Cincinnati, United States	Hard	3R	6–2, 6–4
