= GB Pro-Series Bath =

Aegon GB Pro-Series Bath

Tournament information
- Location: Bath, Great Britain
- Venue: University of Bath Sports Training Village
- Category: ATP Challenger Tour; ITF Women's World Tennis Tour
- Surface: Hard / Indoor
- Draw: 32S/30Q/16D
- Prize money: €42,500+H (men) $25,000 (women)

The Aegon GB Pro-Series Bath is a tennis tournament held in Bath, England since 2011. The event is currently part of the ITF Women's World Tennis Tour and is played on indoor hardcourts. 2011 and 2012 it was part of the ATP Challenger Tour.

== Past finals ==
=== Men's singles ===
Year	Champion	Runner-up	Score
2012	(Germany) Dustin Brown	(Czech Republic) Jan Mertl	7–6^{(1)}, 6–4
2011	(Russia) Dmitry Tursunov	(Germany) Andreas Beck	6–4, 6–4

=== Men's doubles ===
Year	Champions	Runners-up	Score
2012	(Austria) Martin Fischer (Austria) Philipp Oswald	(United Kingdom) Jamie Delgado (United Kingdom) Ken Skupski	6–4, 6–4
2011	(United Kingdom) Jamie Delgado (United Kingdom) Jonathan Marray	(Switzerland) Yves Allegro (Germany) Andreas Beck	6–3, 6–4

=== Women's singles ===
Year	Champion	Runner-up	Score
2023	(Slovakia) Rebecca Šramková	(Czech Republic) Tereza Smitková	6–2, 6–2
2022	(Sweden) Caijsa Hennemann	(United Kingdom) Eliz Maloney	6–1, 7–5
2016–21	not held		
2015	(Romania) Ana Bogdan	(Croatia) Ana Vrljić	6–3, 4–6, 6–1
2014	(Liechtenstein) Stephanie Vogt	(Italy) Alberta Brianti	6–3, 7–6^{(3)}
2013	(Liechtenstein) Stephanie Vogt	(Belgium) An-Sophie Mestach	7–6^{(3)}, 6–3
2012	(Netherlands) Kiki Bertens	(Germany) Annika Beck	6–4, 3–6, 6–3
2011	(Switzerland) Stefanie Vögele	(Poland) Marta Domachowska	6–7^{(3)}, 7–5, 6–2

=== Women's doubles ===
Year	Champions	Runners-up	Score
2023	(United Kingdom) Lauryn John-Baptiste (Slovakia) Katarína Strešnaková	(United Kingdom) Emily Appleton (Netherlands) Isabelle Haverlag	7–6^{(7–4)}, 6–4
2022	(Sweden) Caijsa Hennemann (Estonia) Elena Malõgina	(Romania) Arina Vasilescu (United Kingdom) Emily Webley-Smith	6–4, 6–3
2016–21	not held		
2015	(United Kingdom) Sarah Beth Askew (United Kingdom) Olivia Nicholls	(United Kingdom) Freya Christie (United Kingdom) Lisa Whybourn	1–6, 6–4, [10–2]
2014	(Netherlands) Lesley Kerkhove (Switzerland) Xenia Knoll	(Serbia) Barbara Bonić (Turkey) Pemra Özgen	6–3, 6–1
2013	(Germany) Nicola Geuer (United Kingdom) Lisa Whybourn	(Switzerland) Viktorija Golubic (Germany) Julia Kimmelmann	6–3, 6–4
2012	(Germany) Tatjana Malek (Liechtenstein) Stephanie Vogt	(France) Julie Coin (United Kingdom) Melanie South	6–3, 3–6, [10–3]
2011	(Hungary) Tímea Babos (Luxembourg) Anne Kremer	(Poland) Marta Domachowska (Poland) Katarzyna Piter	7–6^{(5)}, 6–2
