= 2012 ATP Challenger Tour =

Details
- Duration: 2 January 2012 – 2 December 2012
- Edition: 35th (4th under this name)
- Tournaments: 148

Achievements (singles)

The ATP Challenger Tour was the secondary professional tennis circuit organized by the ATP. The 2012 ATP Challenger Tour calendar comprised 15 top tier Tretorn SERIE+ tournaments, and a total of 148 tournaments, with prize money ranging from $35,000 up to $150,000.

== Schedule ==
=== Key ===
ATP Challenger Tour Finals
Tretorn SERIE+ tournaments
Regular

=== January ===
Week of	Tournament	Champions	Runners-up	Semifinalists	Quarterfinalists
January 2	Aberto de São Paulo; São Paulo, Brazil; Regular series Hard – $35,000+H – 32S/32Q/16D; Singles – Doubles	(Brazil) Thiago Alves; 7–6^{(7–5)}, 7–6^{(7–1)}	(Portugal) Gastão Elias	(Argentina) Federico Delbonis (Brazil) Rogério Dutra da Silva	(Argentina) Horacio Zeballos (Slovakia) Jozef Kovalík (Argentina) Agustín Velotti (Brazil) Fernando Romboli
January 2	Aberto de São Paulo; São Paulo, Brazil; Regular series Hard – $35,000+H – 32S/32Q/16D; Singles – Doubles	(Brazil) Fernando Romboli (Brazil) Júlio Silva; 7–5, 6–2	(Slovakia) Jozef Kovalík (Brazil) José Pereira	(Argentina) Federico Delbonis (Brazil) Rogério Dutra da Silva	(Argentina) Horacio Zeballos (Slovakia) Jozef Kovalík (Argentina) Agustín Velotti (Brazil) Fernando Romboli
January 2	Internationaux de Nouvelle-Calédonie; Nouméa, New Caledonia, France; Regular series Hard – $75,000+H – 32S/10Q/16D; Singles – Doubles	(France) Jérémy Chardy; 6–4, 6–3	(Spain) Adrián Menéndez	(France) Florent Serra (Belgium) Ruben Bemelmans	(United States) Michael Russell (France) Kenny de Schepper (France) David Guez (France) Jonathan Dasnières de Veigy
January 2	Internationaux de Nouvelle-Calédonie; Nouméa, New Caledonia, France; Regular series Hard – $75,000+H – 32S/10Q/16D; Singles – Doubles	(Thailand) Sanchai Ratiwatana (Thailand) Sonchat Ratiwatana; 6–0, 6–4	(France) Axel Michon (France) Guillaume Rufin	(France) Florent Serra (Belgium) Ruben Bemelmans	(United States) Michael Russell (France) Kenny de Schepper (France) David Guez (France) Jonathan Dasnières de Veigy
January 9	No tournaments scheduled.				
January 16	No tournaments scheduled.				
January 23	Intersport Heilbronn Open; Heilbronn, Germany; Regular series Hard (indoor) – €85,000+H – 32S/32Q/16D; Singles – Doubles	(Germany) Björn Phau; 6–7^{(4–7)}, 6–3, 6–4	(Belgium) Ruben Bemelmans	(Germany) Dominik Meffert (Germany) Cedrik-Marcel Stebe	(Slovakia) Martin Kližan (South Africa) Rik de Voest (Canada) Vasek Pospisil (Germany) Michael Berrer
January 23	Intersport Heilbronn Open; Heilbronn, Germany; Regular series Hard (indoor) – €85,000+H – 32S/32Q/16D; Singles – Doubles	(Sweden) Johan Brunström (Denmark) Frederik Nielsen; 6–3, 3–6, [10–6]	(Philippines) Treat Conrad Huey (United Kingdom) Dominic Inglot	(Germany) Dominik Meffert (Germany) Cedrik-Marcel Stebe	(Slovakia) Martin Kližan (South Africa) Rik de Voest (Canada) Vasek Pospisil (Germany) Michael Berrer
January 23	Honolulu Challenger; Honolulu, United States; Regular series Hard – $50,000 – 32S/28Q/16D; Singles – Doubles	(Japan) Go Soeda; 6–3, 7–6^{(7–5)}	(United States) Robby Ginepri	(Japan) Tatsuma Ito (Japan) Yūichi Sugita	(United States) Jack Sock (United States) Denis Kudla (United States) Tim Smyczek (Bosnia and Herzegovina) Amer Delić
January 23	Honolulu Challenger; Honolulu, United States; Regular series Hard – $50,000 – 32S/28Q/16D; Singles – Doubles	(Bosnia and Herzegovina) Amer Delić (United States) Travis Rettenmaier; 6–4, 7–6^{(7–3)}	(United States) Nicholas Monroe (United States) Jack Sock	(Japan) Tatsuma Ito (Japan) Yūichi Sugita	(United States) Jack Sock (United States) Denis Kudla (United States) Tim Smyczek (Bosnia and Herzegovina) Amer Delić
January 23	Seguros Bolívar Open Bucaramanga; Bucaramanga, Colombia; Regular series Clay – $35,000+H – 32S/26Q/16D; Singles – Doubles	(United States) Wayne Odesnik; 6–1, 7–6^{(7–4)}	(Romania) Adrian Ungur	(France) Éric Prodon (Italy) Paolo Lorenzi	(Brazil) Júlio Silva (Argentina) Horacio Zeballos (Colombia) Eduardo Struvay (Argentina) Máximo González
January 23	Seguros Bolívar Open Bucaramanga; Bucaramanga, Colombia; Regular series Clay – $35,000+H – 32S/26Q/16D; Singles – Doubles	(Uruguay) Ariel Behar (Argentina) Horacio Zeballos; 6–4, 7–6^{(7–5)}	(Spain) Miguel Ángel López Jaén (Italy) Paolo Lorenzi	(France) Éric Prodon (Italy) Paolo Lorenzi	(Brazil) Júlio Silva (Argentina) Horacio Zeballos (Colombia) Eduardo Struvay (Argentina) Máximo González
January 30	Kazan Kremlin Cup; Kazan, Russia; Regular series Hard (indoor) – $75,000+H – 32S/32Q/16D; Singles – Doubles	(Estonia) Jürgen Zopp; 7–6^{(7–4)}, 7–6^{(7–4)}	(Romania) Marius Copil	(Russia) Teymuraz Gabashvili (Czech Republic) Ivo Minář	(Spain) Javier Martí (Belgium) Ruben Bemelmans (Russia) Mikhail Ledovskikh (Russia) Alexander Kudryavtsev
January 30	Kazan Kremlin Cup; Kazan, Russia; Regular series Hard (indoor) – $75,000+H – 32S/32Q/16D; Singles – Doubles	(Thailand) Sanchai Ratiwatana (Thailand) Sonchat Ratiwatana; 6–3, 6–1	(Belarus) Aliaksandr Bury (Poland) Mateusz Kowalczyk	(Russia) Teymuraz Gabashvili (Czech Republic) Ivo Minář	(Spain) Javier Martí (Belgium) Ruben Bemelmans (Russia) Mikhail Ledovskikh (Russia) Alexander Kudryavtsev
January 30	McDonald's Burnie International; Burnie, Australia; Regular series Hard – $50,000 – 32S/32Q/16D; Singles – Doubles	(Thailand) Danai Udomchoke; 7–6^{(7–5)}, 6–3	(Australia) Samuel Groth	(Japan) Yūichi Sugita (Chinese Taipei) Jimmy Wang	(Australia) John Millman (Chinese Taipei) Chen Ti (Australia) Benjamin Mitchell (Chinese Taipei) Lu Yen-hsun
January 30	McDonald's Burnie International; Burnie, Australia; Regular series Hard – $50,000 – 32S/32Q/16D; Singles – Doubles	(Australia) John Peers (Australia) John-Patrick Smith; 6–2, 6–4	(India) Divij Sharan (India) Vishnu Vardhan	(Japan) Yūichi Sugita (Chinese Taipei) Jimmy Wang	(Australia) John Millman (Chinese Taipei) Chen Ti (Australia) Benjamin Mitchell (Chinese Taipei) Lu Yen-hsun

=== February ===
Week of	Tournament	Champions	Runners-up	Semifinalists	Quarterfinalists
February 6	Challenger of Dallas; Dallas, United States; Regular series Hard (indoor) – $100,000 – 32S/32Q/16D; Singles – Doubles	(United States) Jesse Levine; 6–4, 6–4	(Belgium) Steve Darcis	(Germany) Stefan Seifert (South Africa) Izak van der Merwe	(Australia) Carsten Ball (United States) Denis Kudla (France) Clément Reix (Lithuania) Ričardas Berankis
February 6	Challenger of Dallas; Dallas, United States; Regular series Hard (indoor) – $100,000 – 32S/32Q/16D; Singles – Doubles	(United Kingdom) Chris Eaton (United Kingdom) Dominic Inglot; 6–7^{(6–8)}, 6–4, [19–17]	(United States) Nicholas Monroe (United States) Jack Sock	(Germany) Stefan Seifert (South Africa) Izak van der Merwe	(Australia) Carsten Ball (United States) Denis Kudla (France) Clément Reix (Lithuania) Ričardas Berankis
February 6	Caloundra International; Caloundra, Australia; Regular series Hard – $50,000 – 32S/32Q/16D; Singles – Doubles	(Australia) Marinko Matosevic; 6–0, 6–2	(Australia) Greg Jones	(Chinese Taipei) Lu Yen-hsun (Australia) James Duckworth	(Australia) Benjamin Mitchell (Australia) John Millman (Australia) Brydan Klein (Germany) Sebastian Rieschick
February 6	Caloundra International; Caloundra, Australia; Regular series Hard – $50,000 – 32S/32Q/16D; Singles – Doubles	(Australia) John Peers (Australia) John-Patrick Smith; 7–6^{(7–5)}, 6–4	(United States) John Paul Fruttero (South Africa) Raven Klaasen	(Chinese Taipei) Lu Yen-hsun (Australia) James Duckworth	(Australia) Benjamin Mitchell (Australia) John Millman (Australia) Brydan Klein (Germany) Sebastian Rieschick
February 6	Open BNP Paribas Banque de Bretagne; Quimper, France; Regular series Hard (indoor) – €42,500+H – 32S/32Q/16D; Singles – Doubles	(Netherlands) Igor Sijsling; 6–3, 6–4	(Tunisia) Malek Jaziri	(Spain) Roberto Bautista Agut (Russia) Evgeny Donskoy	(France) Édouard Roger-Vasselin (Germany) Daniel Brands (France) Florent Serra (France) Marc Gicquel
February 6	Open BNP Paribas Banque de Bretagne; Quimper, France; Regular series Hard (indoor) – €42,500+H – 32S/32Q/16D; Singles – Doubles	(France) Pierre-Hugues Herbert (France) Maxime Teixeira; 7–6^{(7–5)}, 6–4	(Germany) Dustin Brown (United Kingdom) Jonathan Marray	(Spain) Roberto Bautista Agut (Russia) Evgeny Donskoy	(France) Édouard Roger-Vasselin (Germany) Daniel Brands (France) Florent Serra (France) Marc Gicquel
February 13	Internazionali Trofeo Lame Perrel–Faip; Bergamo, Italy; Regular series Hard (indoor) – €42,500+H – 32S/32Q/16D; Singles – Doubles	(Germany) Björn Phau; 6–4, 6–4	(Russia) Alexander Kudryavtsev	(Germany) Benjamin Becker (France) Arnaud Clément	(Belarus) Uladzimir Ignatik (Belgium) Maxime Authom (Russia) Konstantin Kravchuk (Estonia) Jürgen Zopp
February 13	Internazionali Trofeo Lame Perrel–Faip; Bergamo, Italy; Regular series Hard (indoor) – €42,500+H – 32S/32Q/16D; Singles – Doubles	(United Kingdom) Jamie Delgado (United Kingdom) Ken Skupski; 7–5, 7–5	(Austria) Martin Fischer (Austria) Philipp Oswald	(Germany) Benjamin Becker (France) Arnaud Clément	(Belarus) Uladzimir Ignatik (Belgium) Maxime Authom (Russia) Konstantin Kravchuk (Estonia) Jürgen Zopp
February 20	Morocco Tennis Tour – Meknes; Meknes, Morocco; Regular series Clay – €30,000+H – 32S/29Q/16D; Singles – Doubles	(Russia) Evgeny Donskoy; 6–1, 6–3	(Romania) Adrian Ungur	(Portugal) João Sousa (Czech Republic) Jan Hájek	(Spain) Inigo Cervantes (Czech Republic) Ivo Minář (Slovenia) Aljaž Bedene (Austria) Andreas Haider-Maurer
February 20	Morocco Tennis Tour – Meknes; Meknes, Morocco; Regular series Clay – €30,000+H – 32S/29Q/16D; Singles – Doubles	(Spain) Adrián Menéndez (Czech Republic) Jaroslav Pospíšil; 6–3, 3–6, [10–8]	(Spain) Gerard Granollers (Spain) Iván Navarro	(Portugal) João Sousa (Czech Republic) Jan Hájek	(Spain) Inigo Cervantes (Czech Republic) Ivo Minář (Slovenia) Aljaž Bedene (Austria) Andreas Haider-Maurer
February 20	Volkswagen Challenger; Wolfsburg, Germany; Regular series €30,000+H – Synthetic (indoor) – 32S/29Q/16D; Singles – Doubles	(Netherlands) Igor Sijsling; 4–6, 6–3, 7–6^{(11–9)}	(Poland) Jerzy Janowicz	(Kazakhstan) Evgeny Korolev (Bosnia and Herzegovina) Amer Delić	(Netherlands) Thomas Schoorel (Canada) Frank Dancevic (Germany) Peter Gojowczyk (Germany) Peter Torebko
February 20	Volkswagen Challenger; Wolfsburg, Germany; Regular series €30,000+H – Synthetic (indoor) – 32S/29Q/16D; Singles – Doubles	(Lithuania) Laurynas Grigelis (Belarus) Uladzimir Ignatik; 7–5, 4–6, [10–5]	(Poland) Tomasz Bednarek (France) Olivier Charroin	(Kazakhstan) Evgeny Korolev (Bosnia and Herzegovina) Amer Delić	(Netherlands) Thomas Schoorel (Canada) Frank Dancevic (Germany) Peter Gojowczyk (Germany) Peter Torebko
February 27	Challenger La Manche; Cherbourg, France; Regular series Hard (indoor) – €42,500+H – 32S/32Q/16D; Singles – Doubles	(France) Josselin Ouanna; 6–3, 6–2	(France) Maxime Teixeira	(Belarus) Uladzimir Ignatik (Netherlands) Thomas Schoorel	(France) Pierre-Hugues Herbert (Belgium) David Goffin (France) Kenny de Schepper (France) Arnaud Clément
February 27	Challenger La Manche; Cherbourg, France; Regular series Hard (indoor) – €42,500+H – 32S/32Q/16D; Singles – Doubles	(Lithuania) Laurynas Grigelis (Belarus) Uladzimir Ignatik; 4–6, 7–6^{(11–9)}, [10–0]	(Germany) Dustin Brown (United Kingdom) Jonathan Marray	(Belarus) Uladzimir Ignatik (Netherlands) Thomas Schoorel	(France) Pierre-Hugues Herbert (Belgium) David Goffin (France) Kenny de Schepper (France) Arnaud Clément
February 27	Singapore ATP Challenger; Singapore; Regular series Hard – $50,000 – 32S/27Q/16D; Singles – Doubles	(Chinese Taipei) Lu Yen-hsun; 6–3, 6–4	(Japan) Go Soeda	(Chinese Taipei) Jimmy Wang (Thailand) Danai Udomchoke	(India) Yuki Bhambri (Germany) Sebastian Rieschick (Israel) Amir Weintraub (Slovakia) Kamil Čapkovič
February 27	Singapore ATP Challenger; Singapore; Regular series Hard – $50,000 – 32S/27Q/16D; Singles – Doubles	(Slovakia) Kamil Čapkovič (Israel) Amir Weintraub; 6–4, 6–4	(Chinese Taipei) Hsieh Cheng-peng (Chinese Taipei) Lee Hsin-han	(Chinese Taipei) Jimmy Wang (Thailand) Danai Udomchoke	(India) Yuki Bhambri (Germany) Sebastian Rieschick (Israel) Amir Weintraub (Slovakia) Kamil Čapkovič
February 27	Aberto de Florianópolis; Florianópolis, Brazil; Regular series Clay – $50,000+H – 32S/32Q/16D; Singles – Doubles	(Italy) Simone Bolelli; 6–3, 6–4	(Slovenia) Blaž Kavčič	(Brazil) Thiago Alves (Argentina) Diego Junqueira	(Croatia) Nikola Mektić (Portugal) Gastão Elias (Brazil) Rogério Dutra da Silva (Brazil) Ricardo Hocevar
February 27	Aberto de Florianópolis; Florianópolis, Brazil; Regular series Clay – $50,000+H – 32S/32Q/16D; Singles – Doubles	(Slovenia) Blaž Kavčič (Croatia) Antonio Veić; 6–3, 6–3	(Spain) Javier Martí (Portugal) Leonardo Tavares	(Brazil) Thiago Alves (Argentina) Diego Junqueira	(Croatia) Nikola Mektić (Portugal) Gastão Elias (Brazil) Rogério Dutra da Silva (Brazil) Ricardo Hocevar
February 27	Morocco Tennis Tour – Casablanca; Casablanca, Morocco; Regular series Clay – €30,000+H – 32S/32Q/16D; Singles – Doubles	(Slovenia) Aljaž Bedene; 7–6^{(8–6)}, 7–6^{(7–4)}	(France) Nicolas Devilder	(Russia) Andrey Kuznetsov (Spain) Íñigo Cervantes Huegun	(Netherlands) Matwé Middelkoop (Spain) Daniel Muñoz de la Nava (Czech Republic) Ivo Minář (Slovakia) Martin Kližan
February 27	Morocco Tennis Tour – Casablanca; Casablanca, Morocco; Regular series Clay – €30,000+H – 32S/32Q/16D; Singles – Doubles	(Italy) Walter Trusendi (Italy) Matteo Viola; 1–6, 7–6^{(7–5)}, [10–3]	(Russia) Evgeny Donskoy (Russia) Andrey Kuznetsov	(Russia) Andrey Kuznetsov (Spain) Íñigo Cervantes Huegun	(Netherlands) Matwé Middelkoop (Spain) Daniel Muñoz de la Nava (Czech Republic) Ivo Minář (Slovakia) Martin Kližan
February 27	Challenger ATP de Salinas Diario Expreso; Salinas, Ecuador; Regular series Hard – $35,000+H – 32S/23Q/16D; Singles – Doubles	(Argentina) Guido Pella; 1–6, 7–5, 6–3	(Italy) Paolo Lorenzi	(Dominican Republic) Víctor Estrella (Argentina) Martín Alund	(Argentina) Marco Trungelliti (Argentina) Horacio Zeballos (France) Augustin Gensse (Spain) Iván Navarro
February 27	Challenger ATP de Salinas Diario Expreso; Salinas, Ecuador; Regular series Hard – $35,000+H – 32S/23Q/16D; Singles – Doubles	(Argentina) Martín Alund (Argentina) Horacio Zeballos; 6–3, 6–3	(Uruguay) Ariel Behar (Colombia) Carlos Salamanca	(Dominican Republic) Víctor Estrella (Argentina) Martín Alund	(Argentina) Marco Trungelliti (Argentina) Horacio Zeballos (France) Augustin Gensse (Spain) Iván Navarro

=== March ===
Week of	Tournament	Champions	Runners-up	Semifinalists	Quarterfinalists
March 5	All Japan Indoor Tennis Championships; Kyoto, Japan; Regular series $35,000+H – Synthetic (indoor) – 32S/32Q/16D; Singles – Doubles	(Japan) Tatsuma Ito; 6–7^{(5–7)}, 6–1, 6–2	(Tunisia) Malek Jaziri	(Japan) Hiroki Moriya (Australia) Samuel Groth	(Germany) Sebastian Rieschick (India) Yuki Bhambri (Japan) Yūichi Sugita (Chinese Taipei) Jimmy Wang
March 5	All Japan Indoor Tennis Championships; Kyoto, Japan; Regular series $35,000+H – Synthetic (indoor) – 32S/32Q/16D; Singles – Doubles	(Thailand) Sanchai Ratiwatana (Thailand) Sonchat Ratiwatana; 7–6^{(9–7)}, 6–3	(Chinese Taipei) Hsieh Cheng-peng (Chinese Taipei) Lee Hsin-han	(Japan) Hiroki Moriya (Australia) Samuel Groth	(Germany) Sebastian Rieschick (India) Yuki Bhambri (Japan) Yūichi Sugita (Chinese Taipei) Jimmy Wang
March 5	Cachantún Cup; Santiago, Chile; Regular series Clay – $35,000+H – 32S/32Q/16D; Singles – Doubles	(Chile) Paul Capdeville; 6–3, 6–7^{(5–7)}, 6–3	(Croatia) Antonio Veić	(Brazil) Fernando Romboli (France) Guillaume Rufin	(Brazil) Leonardo Kirche (Argentina) Eduardo Schwank (Argentina) Martín Alund (Argentina) Guido Pella
March 5	Cachantún Cup; Santiago, Chile; Regular series Clay – $35,000+H – 32S/32Q/16D; Singles – Doubles	(Chile) Paul Capdeville (Uruguay) Marcel Felder; 6–7^{(3–7)}, 6–4, [10–7]	(Chile) Jorge Aguilar (Mexico) Daniel Garza	(Brazil) Fernando Romboli (France) Guillaume Rufin	(Brazil) Leonardo Kirche (Argentina) Eduardo Schwank (Argentina) Martín Alund (Argentina) Guido Pella
March 12	Dallas Tennis Classic; Dallas, United States; Regular series Hard – $125,000+H – 32S/20Q/16D; Singles – Doubles	(Canada) Frank Dancevic; 7–6^{(7–4)}, 6–3	(Russia) Igor Andreev	(Germany) Tommy Haas (Germany) Björn Phau	(Croatia) Marin Čilić (Luxembourg) Gilles Müller (Netherlands) Robin Haase (Slovakia) Lukáš Lacko
March 12	Dallas Tennis Classic; Dallas, United States; Regular series Hard – $125,000+H – 32S/20Q/16D; Singles – Doubles	(Mexico) Santiago González (United States) Scott Lipsky; 6–4, 6–3	(United States) Bobby Reynolds (United States) Michael Russell	(Germany) Tommy Haas (Germany) Björn Phau	(Croatia) Marin Čilić (Luxembourg) Gilles Müller (Netherlands) Robin Haase (Slovakia) Lukáš Lacko
March 12	Jalisco Open; Guadalajara, Mexico; Regular series Hard – $100,000 – 32S/32Q/16D; Singles – Doubles	(Brazil) Thiago Alves; 6–3, 7–6^{(7–4)}	(Italy) Paolo Lorenzi	(Belgium) Ruben Bemelmans (Moldova) Roman Borvanov	(Germany) Dominik Meffert (Switzerland) Marco Chiudinelli (Canada) Érik Chvojka (United States) Rajeev Ram
March 12	Jalisco Open; Guadalajara, Mexico; Regular series Hard – $100,000 – 32S/32Q/16D; Singles – Doubles	(United States) James Cerretani (Canada) Adil Shamasdin; 7–6^{(7–5)}, 6–1	(Poland) Tomasz Bednarek (France) Olivier Charroin	(Belgium) Ruben Bemelmans (Moldova) Roman Borvanov	(Germany) Dominik Meffert (Switzerland) Marco Chiudinelli (Canada) Érik Chvojka (United States) Rajeev Ram
March 12	Green World ATP Challenger; Pingguo, China; Regular series Hard – $50,000 – 32S/7Q/16D; Singles – Doubles	(Japan) Go Soeda; 6–1, 3–6, 7–5	(Tunisia) Malek Jaziri	(Slovakia) Kamil Čapkovič (Ukraine) Denys Molchanov	(Australia) Benjamin Mitchell (Israel) Amir Weintraub (China) Zhang Ze (Chinese Taipei) Jimmy Wang
March 12	Green World ATP Challenger; Pingguo, China; Regular series Hard – $50,000 – 32S/7Q/16D; Singles – Doubles	(United States) John Paul Fruttero (South Africa) Raven Klaasen; 6–2, 6–4	(Australia) Colin Ebelthite (Australia) Samuel Groth	(Slovakia) Kamil Čapkovič (Ukraine) Denys Molchanov	(Australia) Benjamin Mitchell (Israel) Amir Weintraub (China) Zhang Ze (Chinese Taipei) Jimmy Wang
March 12	Morocco Tennis Tour – Rabat; Rabat, Morocco; Regular series Clay – €30,000+H – 32S/32Q/16D; Singles – Doubles	(Slovakia) Martin Kližan; 6–2, 6–3	(Italy) Filippo Volandri	(Russia) Andrey Kuznetsov (Germany) Simon Greul	(France) Stéphane Robert (Algeria) Lamine Ouahab (Spain) Guillermo Olaso (Spain) Pere Riba
March 12	Morocco Tennis Tour – Rabat; Rabat, Morocco; Regular series Clay – €30,000+H – 32S/32Q/16D; Singles – Doubles	(Spain) Íñigo Cervantes Huegun (Argentina) Federico Delbonis; 6–7^{(3–7)}, 6–3, [10–5]	(Slovakia) Martin Kližan (France) Stéphane Robert	(Russia) Andrey Kuznetsov (Germany) Simon Greul	(France) Stéphane Robert (Algeria) Lamine Ouahab (Spain) Guillermo Olaso (Spain) Pere Riba
March 12	BH Telecom Indoors; Sarajevo, Bosnia and Herzegovina; Regular series Hard (indoor) – €30,000+H – 32S/20Q/16D; Singles – Doubles	(Czech Republic) Jan Hernych; 6–3, 3–6, 7–6^{(7–5)}	(Czech Republic) Jan Mertl	(Russia) Alexander Kudryavtsev (Germany) Dustin Brown	(Serbia) Ilija Bozoljac (Serbia) Dušan Lajović (Poland) Jerzy Janowicz (Serbia) Nikola Cacic
March 12	BH Telecom Indoors; Sarajevo, Bosnia and Herzegovina; Regular series Hard (indoor) – €30,000+H – 32S/20Q/16D; Singles – Doubles	(Germany) Dustin Brown (United Kingdom) Jonathan Marray; 7–6^{(7–2)}, 2–6, [11–9]	(Slovakia) Michal Mertiňák (Slovakia) Igor Zelenay	(Russia) Alexander Kudryavtsev (Germany) Dustin Brown	(Serbia) Ilija Bozoljac (Serbia) Dušan Lajović (Poland) Jerzy Janowicz (Serbia) Nikola Cacic
March 19	Aegon GB Pro-Series Bath; Bath, Great Britain; Regular series Hard – €42,500 (indoor) – 32S/30Q/16D; Singles – Doubles	(Germany) Dustin Brown; 7–6^{(7–1)}, 6–4	(Czech Republic) Jan Mertl	(United Kingdom) Jamie Baker (Germany) Michael Berrer	(Germany) Andreas Beck (France) Romain Jouan (Belgium) Yannick Mertens (Lithuania) Laurynas Grigelis
March 19	Aegon GB Pro-Series Bath; Bath, Great Britain; Regular series Hard – €42,500 (indoor) – 32S/30Q/16D; Singles – Doubles	(Austria) Martin Fischer (Austria) Philipp Oswald; 6–4, 6–4	(United Kingdom) Jamie Delgado (United Kingdom) Ken Skupski	(United Kingdom) Jamie Baker (Germany) Michael Berrer	(Germany) Andreas Beck (France) Romain Jouan (Belgium) Yannick Mertens (Lithuania) Laurynas Grigelis
March 19	Morocco Tennis Tour – Marrakech; Marrakesh, Morocco; Regular series Clay – €30,000+H – 32S/32Q/16D; Singles – Doubles	(Slovakia) Martin Kližan; 3–6, 6–3, 6–0	(Romania) Adrian Ungur	(Spain) Adrián Menéndez (Romania) Victor Hănescu	(France) Paul-Henri Mathieu (Romania) Victor Crivoi (Argentina) Federico Delbonis (Spain) Pablo Carreño Busta
March 19	Morocco Tennis Tour – Marrakech; Marrakesh, Morocco; Regular series Clay – €30,000+H – 32S/32Q/16D; Singles – Doubles	(Slovakia) Martin Kližan (Spain) Daniel Muñoz de la Nava; 6–3, 1–6, [12–10]	(Spain) Íñigo Cervantes Huegun (Argentina) Federico Delbonis	(Spain) Adrián Menéndez (Romania) Victor Hănescu	(France) Paul-Henri Mathieu (Romania) Victor Crivoi (Argentina) Federico Delbonis (Spain) Pablo Carreño Busta
March 19	Men's Rimouski Challenger; Rimouski, Canada; Regular series Hard (indoor) – $35,000+H – 32S/30Q/16D; Singles – Doubles	(Canada) Vasek Pospisil; 7–6^{(8–6)}, 6–4	(Belgium) Maxime Authom	(Japan) Tatsuma Ito (Canada) Filip Peliwo	(France) Clément Reix (Canada) Érik Chvojka (France) Mathieu Rodrigues (Switzerland) Stéphane Bohli
March 19	Men's Rimouski Challenger; Rimouski, Canada; Regular series Hard (indoor) – $35,000+H – 32S/30Q/16D; Singles – Doubles	(Poland) Tomasz Bednarek (France) Olivier Charroin; 6–3, 6–2	(Germany) Jaan-Frederik Brunken (Germany) Stefan Seifert	(Japan) Tatsuma Ito (Canada) Filip Peliwo	(France) Clément Reix (Canada) Érik Chvojka (France) Mathieu Rodrigues (Switzerland) Stéphane Bohli
March 26	Orange Open Guadeloupe; Le Gosier, France; Regular series Hard – $100,000+H – 32S/23Q/16D; Singles – Doubles	(Belgium) David Goffin; 6–2, 6–2	(Germany) Mischa Zverev	(Belgium) Olivier Rochus (France) Édouard Roger-Vasselin	(Slovakia) Ivo Klec (Russia) Igor Kunitsyn (Germany) Benjamin Becker (Japan) Yūichi Sugita
March 26	Orange Open Guadeloupe; Le Gosier, France; Regular series Hard – $100,000+H – 32S/23Q/16D; Singles – Doubles	(France) Pierre-Hugues Herbert (France) Albano Olivetti; 7–5, 1–6, [10–7]	(Australia) Paul Hanley (Australia) Jordan Kerr	(Belgium) Olivier Rochus (France) Édouard Roger-Vasselin	(Slovakia) Ivo Klec (Russia) Igor Kunitsyn (Germany) Benjamin Becker (Japan) Yūichi Sugita
March 26	Seguros Bolívar Open Barranquilla; Barranquilla, Colombia; Regular series Hard – $50,000+H – 32S/32Q/16D; Singles – Doubles	(Colombia) Alejandro Falla; 6–4, 6–1	(Argentina) Horacio Zeballos	(Argentina) Martín Alund (Portugal) Pedro Sousa	(Italy) Matteo Marrai (Argentina) Marco Trungelliti (Argentina) Guido Pella (Argentina) Facundo Bagnis
March 26	Seguros Bolívar Open Barranquilla; Barranquilla, Colombia; Regular series Hard – $50,000+H – 32S/32Q/16D; Singles – Doubles	(United States) Nicholas Monroe (United States) Maciek Sykut; 2–6, 6–3, [10–5]	(Uruguay) Marcel Felder (Germany) Frank Moser	(Argentina) Martín Alund (Portugal) Pedro Sousa	(Italy) Matteo Marrai (Argentina) Marco Trungelliti (Argentina) Guido Pella (Argentina) Facundo Bagnis

=== April ===
Week of	Tournament	Champions	Runners-up	Semifinalists	Quarterfinalists
April 2	Tallahassee Tennis Challenger; Tallahassee, United States; Regular series Hard – $50,000 – 32S/32Q/16D; Singles – Doubles	(United States) Tim Smyczek; 7–5, retired	(Canada) Frank Dancevic	(Japan) Tatsuma Ito (United States) Rajeev Ram	(United States) Bobby Reynolds (United States) Wayne Odesnik (Russia) Igor Kunitsyn (United States) Ryan Sweeting
April 2	Tallahassee Tennis Challenger; Tallahassee, United States; Regular series Hard – $50,000 – 32S/32Q/16D; Singles – Doubles	(Germany) Martin Emmrich (Sweden) Andreas Siljeström; 6–2, 7–6^{(7–4)}	(New Zealand) Artem Sitak (United States) Blake Strode	(Japan) Tatsuma Ito (United States) Rajeev Ram	(United States) Bobby Reynolds (United States) Wayne Odesnik (Russia) Igor Kunitsyn (United States) Ryan Sweeting
April 2	Open Barletta Trofeo Dimiccoli & Boraccino; Barletta, Italy; Regular series Clay – €42,500+H – 32S/15Q/16D; Singles – Doubles	(Slovenia) Aljaž Bedene; 6–2, 6–0	(Italy) Potito Starace	(Tunisia) Malek Jaziri (Italy) Filippo Volandri	(Netherlands) Matwé Middelkoop (Italy) Enrico Burzi (Romania) Victor Hănescu (Germany) Daniel Brands
April 2	Open Barletta Trofeo Dimiccoli & Boraccino; Barletta, Italy; Regular series Clay – €42,500+H – 32S/15Q/16D; Singles – Doubles	(Sweden) Johan Brunström (Belgium) Dick Norman; 6–4, 7–5	(United Kingdom) Jonathan Marray (Slovakia) Igor Zelenay	(Tunisia) Malek Jaziri (Italy) Filippo Volandri	(Netherlands) Matwé Middelkoop (Italy) Enrico Burzi (Romania) Victor Hănescu (Germany) Daniel Brands
April 2	Open Prévadiès Saint–Brieuc; Saint-Brieuc, France; Regular series Clay – €30,500+H – 32S/16Q/16D; Singles – Doubles	(France) Grégoire Burquier; 7–5, 6–7^{(5–7)}, 7–6^{(7–3)}	(France) Augustin Gensse	(France) Josselin Ouanna (Germany) Peter Gojowczyk	(Spain) Daniel Gimeno Traver (France) Marc Gicquel (France) Maxime Teixeira (France) Jonathan Dasnières de Veigy
April 2	Open Prévadiès Saint–Brieuc; Saint-Brieuc, France; Regular series Clay – €30,500+H – 32S/16Q/16D; Singles – Doubles	(Lithuania) Laurynas Grigelis (Australia) Rameez Junaid; 1–6, 6–2, [10–6]	(France) Stéphane Robert (France) Laurent Rochette	(France) Josselin Ouanna (Germany) Peter Gojowczyk	(Spain) Daniel Gimeno Traver (France) Marc Gicquel (France) Maxime Teixeira (France) Jonathan Dasnières de Veigy
April 2	San Luis Potosí Challenger; San Luis Potosí, Mexico; Regular series Clay – $35,500+H – 32S/32Q/16D; Singles – Doubles	(Spain) Rubén Ramírez Hidalgo; 3–6, 6–3, 6–4	(Italy) Paolo Lorenzi	(Italy) Riccardo Ghedin (Argentina) Agustín Velotti	(Brazil) Fabiano de Paula (United States) Denis Zivkovic (Argentina) Marco Trungelliti (Brazil) Guilherme Clezar
April 2	San Luis Potosí Challenger; San Luis Potosí, Mexico; Regular series Clay – $35,500+H – 32S/32Q/16D; Singles – Doubles	(United States) Nicholas Monroe (Germany) Simon Stadler; 3–6, 7–5, [10–7]	(Germany) Andre Begemann (Australia) Jordan Kerr	(Italy) Riccardo Ghedin (Argentina) Agustín Velotti	(Brazil) Fabiano de Paula (United States) Denis Zivkovic (Argentina) Marco Trungelliti (Brazil) Guilherme Clezar
April 9	Seguros Bolívar Open Pereira; Pereira, Colombia; Regular series Clay – $50,000+H – 32S/22Q/16D; Singles – Doubles	(Colombia) Carlos Salamanca; 5–7, 6–2, 6–1	(Spain) Rubén Ramírez Hidalgo	(Colombia) Santiago Giraldo (Argentina) Martín Alund	(Colombia) Nicolás Barrientos (Colombia) Robert Farah (Argentina) Marco Trungelliti (Montenegro) Goran Tošić
April 9	Seguros Bolívar Open Pereira; Pereira, Colombia; Regular series Clay – $50,000+H – 32S/22Q/16D; Singles – Doubles	(Argentina) Martín Alund (Argentina) Guido Pella; 6–3, 2–6, [10–5]	(Argentina) Sebastián Decoud (Spain) Rubén Ramírez Hidalgo	(Colombia) Santiago Giraldo (Argentina) Martín Alund	(Colombia) Nicolás Barrientos (Colombia) Robert Farah (Argentina) Marco Trungelliti (Montenegro) Goran Tošić
April 9	Aberto Santa Catarina de Tenis; Blumenau, Brazil; Regular series Clay – $35,000+H – 32S/29Q/16D; Singles – Doubles	(Croatia) Antonio Veić; 3–6, 6–4, 5–2, retired	(Chile) Paul Capdeville	(Slovenia) Blaž Kavčič (Italy) Alberto Brizzi	(Brazil) Thiago Alves (Australia) James Duckworth (Portugal) Gastão Elias (Brazil) Rogério Dutra da Silva
April 9	Aberto Santa Catarina de Tenis; Blumenau, Brazil; Regular series Clay – $35,000+H – 32S/29Q/16D; Singles – Doubles	(Croatia) Marin Draganja (Croatia) Dino Marcan; 6–2, 6–0	(Slovenia) Blaž Kavčič (Croatia) Antonio Veić	(Slovenia) Blaž Kavčič (Italy) Alberto Brizzi	(Brazil) Thiago Alves (Australia) James Duckworth (Portugal) Gastão Elias (Brazil) Rogério Dutra da Silva
April 9	Mersin Cup; Mersin, Turkey; Regular series Clay – €42,500 – 32S/8Q/16D; Singles – Doubles	(Portugal) João Sousa; 6–4, 0–6, 6–4	(Spain) Javier Martí	(Netherlands) Thomas Schoorel (Czech Republic) Jan Hájek	(Serbia) Dušan Lajović (Netherlands) Igor Sijsling (Germany) Daniel Brands (Italy) Simone Vagnozzi
April 9	Mersin Cup; Mersin, Turkey; Regular series Clay – €42,500 – 32S/8Q/16D; Singles – Doubles	(Moldova) Radu Albot (Ukraine) Denys Molchanov; 6–0, 6–2	(Italy) Alessandro Motti (Italy) Simone Vagnozzi	(Netherlands) Thomas Schoorel (Czech Republic) Jan Hájek	(Serbia) Dušan Lajović (Netherlands) Igor Sijsling (Germany) Daniel Brands (Italy) Simone Vagnozzi
April 9	Torneo Internacional AGT; León, Mexico; Regular series Hard – $35,000+H – 32S/32Q/16D; Singles – Doubles	(United States) Denis Zivkovic; 7–6^{(7–5)}, 6–4	(United States) Rajeev Ram	(Argentina) Agustín Velotti (Italy) Matteo Viola	(Mexico) Miguel Gallardo-Vallés (Slovakia) Andrej Martin (Mexico) Daniel Garza (Australia) John-Patrick Smith
April 9	Torneo Internacional AGT; León, Mexico; Regular series Hard – $35,000+H – 32S/32Q/16D; Singles – Doubles	(Australia) John Peers (Australia) John-Patrick Smith; 6–3, 6–3	(Mexico) César Ramírez (Mexico) Bruno Rodríguez	(Argentina) Agustín Velotti (Italy) Matteo Viola	(Mexico) Miguel Gallardo-Vallés (Slovakia) Andrej Martin (Mexico) Daniel Garza (Australia) John-Patrick Smith
April 16	Sarasota Open; Sarasota, United States; Regular series Clay – $100,000 – 32S/32Q/16D; Singles – Doubles	(United States) Sam Querrey; 6–1, 6–7^{(3–7)}, 6–3	(Italy) Paolo Lorenzi	(United States) Wayne Odesnik (United States) Michael Russell	(United States) James Blake (France) Éric Prodon (Russia) Teymuraz Gabashvili (United States) Michael Yani
April 16	Sarasota Open; Sarasota, United States; Regular series Clay – $100,000 – 32S/32Q/16D; Singles – Doubles	(Sweden) Johan Brunström (South Africa) Izak van der Merwe; 6–4, 6–1	(Germany) Martin Emmrich (Sweden) Andreas Siljeström	(United States) Wayne Odesnik (United States) Michael Russell	(United States) James Blake (France) Éric Prodon (Russia) Teymuraz Gabashvili (United States) Michael Yani
April 16	Rai Open; Rome, Italy; Regular series Clay – €30,000+H – 32S/32Q/16D; Singles – Doubles	(Spain) Roberto Bautista Agut; 6–7^{(7–9)}, 6–4, 6–3	(Portugal) Rui Machado	(Serbia) Dušan Lajović (Czech Republic) Jan Hájek	(Germany) Simon Greul (Netherlands) Jesse Huta Galung (Portugal) João Sousa (France) Florent Serra
April 16	Rai Open; Rome, Italy; Regular series Clay – €30,000+H – 32S/32Q/16D; Singles – Doubles	(Germany) Dustin Brown (United Kingdom) Jonathan Marray; 6–4, 7–6^{(7–0)}	(Romania) Andrei Dăescu (Romania) Florin Mergea	(Serbia) Dušan Lajović (Czech Republic) Jan Hájek	(Germany) Simon Greul (Netherlands) Jesse Huta Galung (Portugal) João Sousa (France) Florent Serra
April 16	Santos Brasil Tennis Open; Santos, Brazil; Regular series Clay – $35,000+H – 32S/32Q/16D; Singles – Doubles	(Czech Republic) Ivo Minář; 4–6, 6–1, 6–4	(Brazil) Ricardo Hocevar	(Argentina) Martín Alund (Argentina) Marco Trungelliti	(Brazil) Júlio Silva (Argentina) Diego Junqueira (Argentina) Máximo González (Brazil) Rogério Dutra da Silva
April 16	Santos Brasil Tennis Open; Santos, Brazil; Regular series Clay – $35,000+H – 32S/32Q/16D; Singles – Doubles	(Argentina) Andrés Molteni (Argentina) Marco Trungelliti; 6–4, 6–3	(Brazil) Rogério Dutra da Silva (Brazil) Júlio Silva	(Argentina) Martín Alund (Argentina) Marco Trungelliti	(Brazil) Júlio Silva (Argentina) Diego Junqueira (Argentina) Máximo González (Brazil) Rogério Dutra da Silva
April 23	OEC Kaohsiung; Kaohsiung, Taiwan; Regular series Hard – $125,000+H – 32S/29Q/16D; Singles – Doubles	(Japan) Go Soeda; 6–3, 6–0	(Japan) Tatsuma Ito	(Switzerland) Marco Chiudinelli (France) Vincent Millot	(Chinese Taipei) Yen-Hsun Lu (New Zealand) Daniel King-Turner (Bosnia and Herzegovina) Mirza Bašić (United Kingdom) James Ward
April 23	OEC Kaohsiung; Kaohsiung, Taiwan; Regular series Hard – $125,000+H – 32S/29Q/16D; Singles – Doubles	(United States) John Paul Fruttero (South Africa) Raven Klaasen; 6–7^{(6–8)}, 7–5, [10–8]	(New Zealand) Daniel King-Turner (Denmark) Frederik Nielsen	(Switzerland) Marco Chiudinelli (France) Vincent Millot	(Chinese Taipei) Yen-Hsun Lu (New Zealand) Daniel King-Turner (Bosnia and Herzegovina) Mirza Bašić (United Kingdom) James Ward
April 23	Tennis Napoli Cup; Naples, Italy; Regular series Clay – €30,000+H – 32S/27Q/16D; Singles – Doubles	(Russia) Andrey Kuznetsov; 7–6^{(8–6)}, 7–6^{(8–6)}	(France) Jonathan Dasnières de Veigy	(France) Adrian Mannarino (Netherlands) Thomas Schoorel	(Portugal) Pedro Sousa (Belgium) Maxime Authom (Italy) Thomas Fabbiano (Serbia) Dušan Lajović
April 23	Tennis Napoli Cup; Naples, Italy; Regular series Clay – €30,000+H – 32S/27Q/16D; Singles – Doubles	(Lithuania) Laurynas Grigelis (Italy) Alessandro Motti; 6–4, 6–4	(Australia) Rameez Junaid (Slovakia) Igor Zelenay	(France) Adrian Mannarino (Netherlands) Thomas Schoorel	(Portugal) Pedro Sousa (Belgium) Maxime Authom (Italy) Thomas Fabbiano (Serbia) Dušan Lajović
April 23	Savannah Challenger; Savannah, United States; Regular series Clay – $50,000 – 32S/32Q/16D; Singles – Doubles	(United States) Brian Baker; 6–4, 6–3	(France) Augustin Gensse	(United States) Blake Strode (United States) Ryan Sweeting	(Canada) Peter Polansky (United States) Robby Ginepri (United States) Rhyne Williams (Canada) Vasek Pospisil
April 23	Savannah Challenger; Savannah, United States; Regular series Clay – $50,000 – 32S/32Q/16D; Singles – Doubles	(Australia) Carsten Ball (United States) Bobby Reynolds; 7–6^{(9–7)}, 6–4	(United States) Travis Parrott (Germany) Simon Stadler	(United States) Blake Strode (United States) Ryan Sweeting	(Canada) Peter Polansky (United States) Robby Ginepri (United States) Rhyne Williams (Canada) Vasek Pospisil
April 23	IS Open de Tênis; São Paulo, Brazil; Regular series Clay – $35,000+H – 32S/16Q/16D; Singles – Doubles	(Slovenia) Blaž Kavčič; 6–3, 7–5	(Brazil) Júlio Silva	(Czech Republic) Ivo Minář (Australia) James Duckworth	(Italy) Alberto Brizzi (Brazil) Rogério Dutra da Silva (Portugal) Gastão Elias (Argentina) Facundo Argüello
April 23	IS Open de Tênis; São Paulo, Brazil; Regular series Clay – $35,000+H – 32S/16Q/16D; Singles – Doubles	(Chile) Paul Capdeville (Uruguay) Marcel Felder; 7–5, 6–3	(Brazil) André Ghem (Brazil) João Pedro Sorgi	(Czech Republic) Ivo Minář (Australia) James Duckworth	(Italy) Alberto Brizzi (Brazil) Rogério Dutra da Silva (Portugal) Gastão Elias (Argentina) Facundo Argüello
April 30	Tunis Open; Tunis, Tunisia; Tretorn SERIE+ Clay – $125,000+H – 32S/17Q/16D; Singles – Doubles	(Spain) Rubén Ramírez Hidalgo; 6–1, 6–4	(France) Jérémy Chardy	(Spain) Marcel Granollers (Estonia) Jürgen Zopp	(Spain) Roberto Bautista Agut (Poland) Jerzy Janowicz (France) Marc Gicquel (Turkey) Marsel İlhan
April 30	Tunis Open; Tunis, Tunisia; Tretorn SERIE+ Clay – $125,000+H – 32S/17Q/16D; Singles – Doubles	(Poland) Jerzy Janowicz (Estonia) Jürgen Zopp; 7–6^{(7–1)}, 6–3	(United States) Nicholas Monroe (Germany) Simon Stadler	(Spain) Marcel Granollers (Estonia) Jürgen Zopp	(Spain) Roberto Bautista Agut (Poland) Jerzy Janowicz (France) Marc Gicquel (Turkey) Marsel İlhan
April 30	Prosperita Open; Ostrava, Czech Republic; Regular series Clay – €42,500 – 32S/30Q/16D; Singles – Doubles	(France) Jonathan Dasnières de Veigy; 7–5, 6–2	(Czech Republic) Jan Hájek	(France) Guillaume Rufin (Italy) Simone Vagnozzi	(Italy) Enrico Burzi (Czech Republic) Dušan Lojda (Italy) Matteo Marrai (Slovakia) Andrej Martin
April 30	Prosperita Open; Ostrava, Czech Republic; Regular series Clay – €42,500 – 32S/30Q/16D; Singles – Doubles	(Moldova) Radu Albot (Russia) Teymuraz Gabashvili; 7–5, 5–7, [10–8]	(Czech Republic) Adam Pavlásek (Czech Republic) Jiří Veselý	(France) Guillaume Rufin (Italy) Simone Vagnozzi	(Italy) Enrico Burzi (Czech Republic) Dušan Lojda (Italy) Matteo Marrai (Slovakia) Andrej Martin

=== May ===
Week of	Tournament	Champions	Runners-up	Semifinalists	Quarterfinalists
May 7	CNGvitall Prague Open; Prague, Czech Republic; Regular series Clay – €85,000 – 32S/32Q/16D; Singles – Doubles	(Argentina) Horacio Zeballos; 1–6, 6–4, 7–6^{(8–6)}	(Slovakia) Martin Kližan	(Germany) Tobias Kamke (Slovenia) Aljaž Bedene	(Germany) Matthias Bachinger (Germany) Dominik Meffert (Czech Republic) Lukáš Rosol (Germany) Kevin Krawietz
May 7	CNGvitall Prague Open; Prague, Czech Republic; Regular series Clay – €85,000 – 32S/32Q/16D; Singles – Doubles	(Czech Republic) Lukáš Rosol (Argentina) Horacio Zeballos; 7–5, 2–6, [12–10]	(Slovakia) Martin Kližan (Slovakia) Igor Zelenay	(Germany) Tobias Kamke (Slovenia) Aljaž Bedene	(Germany) Matthias Bachinger (Germany) Dominik Meffert (Czech Republic) Lukáš Rosol (Germany) Kevin Krawietz
May 7	Busan Open Challenger Tennis; Busan, South Korea; Regular series Hard – $75,500+H – 32S/32Q/16D; Singles – Doubles	(Japan) Tatsuma Ito; 6–4, 6–3	(Australia) John Millman	(Chinese Taipei) Yang Tsung-hua (Thailand) Danai Udomchoke	(Slovakia) Ivo Klec (Belarus) Uladzimir Ignatik (Denmark) Frederik Nielsen (Israel) Amir Weintraub
May 7	Busan Open Challenger Tennis; Busan, South Korea; Regular series Hard – $75,500+H – 32S/32Q/16D; Singles – Doubles	(India) Yuki Bhambri (India) Divij Sharan; 1–6, 6–1, [10–5]	(Chinese Taipei) Hsieh Cheng-peng (Chinese Taipei) Lee Hsin-han	(Chinese Taipei) Yang Tsung-hua (Thailand) Danai Udomchoke	(Slovakia) Ivo Klec (Belarus) Uladzimir Ignatik (Denmark) Frederik Nielsen (Israel) Amir Weintraub
May 7	Status Athens Open; Athens, Greece; Regular series Hard – €42,500 – 32S/32Q/16D; Singles – Doubles	(Australia) Marinko Matosevic; 6–3, 6–4	(Belgium) Ruben Bemelmans	(Canada) Peter Polansky (Slovakia) Karol Beck	(United Kingdom) Jamie Baker (Moldova) Roman Borvanov (Estonia) Jürgen Zopp (Lithuania) Laurynas Grigelis
May 7	Status Athens Open; Athens, Greece; Regular series Hard – €42,500 – 32S/32Q/16D; Singles – Doubles	(Germany) Andre Begemann (Australia) Jordan Kerr; 6–2, 6–3	(Spain) Gerard Granollers (Greece) Alexandros Jakupovic	(Canada) Peter Polansky (Slovakia) Karol Beck	(United Kingdom) Jamie Baker (Moldova) Roman Borvanov (Estonia) Jürgen Zopp (Lithuania) Laurynas Grigelis
May 7	Rio Quente Resorts Tennis Classic; Rio Quente, Brazil; Regular series Hard – $35,000+H – 32S/7Q/16D; Singles – Doubles	(Brazil) Guilherme Clezar; 7–6^{(7–4)}, 6–3	(Chile) Paul Capdeville	(United States) Andrea Collarini (Brazil) Thiago Alves	(Argentina) Renzo Olivo (Argentina) Guido Andreozzi (Brazil) André Ghem (Brazil) Bruno Sant'anna
May 7	Rio Quente Resorts Tennis Classic; Rio Quente, Brazil; Regular series Hard – $35,000+H – 32S/7Q/16D; Singles – Doubles	(Argentina) Guido Andreozzi (Uruguay) Marcel Felder; 6–3, 6–3	(Brazil) Thiago Alves (Brazil) Augusto Laranja	(United States) Andrea Collarini (Brazil) Thiago Alves	(Argentina) Renzo Olivo (Argentina) Guido Andreozzi (Brazil) André Ghem (Brazil) Bruno Sant'anna
May 7	Roma Open; Rome, Italy; Regular series Clay – €30,000+H – 32S/26Q/16D; Singles – Doubles	(Poland) Jerzy Janowicz; 7–6^{(7–3)}, 6–3	(Luxembourg) Gilles Müller	(Italy) Simone Bolelli (Portugal) Rui Machado	(Italy) Thomas Fabbiano (Germany) Simon Greul (Croatia) Antonio Veić (United States) Rhyne Williams
May 7	Roma Open; Rome, Italy; Regular series Clay – €30,000+H – 32S/26Q/16D; Singles – Doubles	(United Kingdom) Jamie Delgado (United Kingdom) Ken Skupski; 6–1, 6–4	(Spain) Adrián Menéndez (Italy) Walter Trusendi	(Italy) Simone Bolelli (Portugal) Rui Machado	(Italy) Thomas Fabbiano (Germany) Simon Greul (Croatia) Antonio Veić (United States) Rhyne Williams
May 14	BNP Paribas Primrose Bordeaux; Bordeaux, France; Regular series Clay – €85,000+H – 32S/32Q/16D; Singles – Doubles	(Slovakia) Martin Kližan; 7–5, 6–3	(Russia) Teymuraz Gabashvili	(Spain) Roberto Bautista Agut (Czech Republic) Lukáš Rosol	(Estonia) Jürgen Zopp (Australia) Marinko Matosevic (France) Nicolas Mahut (France) Paul-Henri Mathieu
May 14	BNP Paribas Primrose Bordeaux; Bordeaux, France; Regular series Clay – €85,000+H – 32S/32Q/16D; Singles – Doubles	(Slovakia) Martin Kližan (Slovakia) Igor Zelenay; 7–6^{(7–5)}, 4–6, [10–4]	(France) Olivier Charroin (United Kingdom) Jonathan Marray	(Spain) Roberto Bautista Agut (Czech Republic) Lukáš Rosol	(Estonia) Jürgen Zopp (Australia) Marinko Matosevic (France) Nicolas Mahut (France) Paul-Henri Mathieu
May 14	Fergana Challenger; Fergana, Uzbekistan; Regular series Hard – $35,000+H – 32S/28Q/16D; Singles – Doubles	(India) Yuki Bhambri; 6–3, 6–3	(Israel) Amir Weintraub	(Ukraine) Denys Molchanov (Russia) Evgeny Kirillov	(Uzbekistan) Farrukh Dustov (Russia) Mikhail Ledovskikh (Australia) Brydan Klein (Italy) Riccardo Ghedin
May 14	Fergana Challenger; Fergana, Uzbekistan; Regular series Hard – $35,000+H – 32S/28Q/16D; Singles – Doubles	(South Africa) Raven Klaasen (South Africa) Izak van der Merwe; 6–3, 6–4	(Thailand) Sanchai Ratiwatana (Thailand) Sonchat Ratiwatana	(Ukraine) Denys Molchanov (Russia) Evgeny Kirillov	(Uzbekistan) Farrukh Dustov (Russia) Mikhail Ledovskikh (Australia) Brydan Klein (Italy) Riccardo Ghedin
May 21	No tournaments scheduled.				
May 28	No tournaments scheduled.				

=== June ===
Week of	Tournament	Champions	Runners-up	Semifinalists	Quarterfinalists
June 4	UniCredit Czech Open; Prostějov, Czech Republic; Regular series Clay – €106,500+H – 32S/29Q/16D; Singles – Doubles	(Germany) Florian Mayer; 7–6^{(7–1)}, 3–6, 7–6^{(7–3)}	(Czech Republic) Jan Hájek	(Poland) Jerzy Janowicz (Czech Republic) Radek Štěpánek	(Slovakia) Marek Semjan (Spain) Albert Montañés (Russia) Teymuraz Gabashvili (Slovakia) Pavol Červenák
June 4	UniCredit Czech Open; Prostějov, Czech Republic; Regular series Clay – €106,500+H – 32S/29Q/16D; Singles – Doubles	(Chinese Taipei) Cheng-peng Hsieh (Chinese Taipei) Hsin-han Lee; 7–5, 7–5	(Australia) Colin Ebelthite (Australia) John Peers	(Poland) Jerzy Janowicz (Czech Republic) Radek Štěpánek	(Slovakia) Marek Semjan (Spain) Albert Montañés (Russia) Teymuraz Gabashvili (Slovakia) Pavol Červenák
June 4	Città di Caltanissetta; Caltanissetta, Italy; Regular series Clay – $64,000+H – 32S/24Q/16D; Singles – Doubles	(Spain) Tommy Robredo; 6–3, 6–2	(Portugal) Gastão Elias	(Spain) Íñigo Cervantes Huegun (Colombia) Alejandro González	(Netherlands) Thomas Schoorel (Italy) Matteo Viola (United States) Daniel Kosakowski (Germany) Dominik Meffert
June 4	Città di Caltanissetta; Caltanissetta, Italy; Regular series Clay – $64,000+H – 32S/24Q/16D; Singles – Doubles	(Uruguay) Marcel Felder (Croatia) Antonio Veić; 5–7, 7–6^{(7–5)}, [10–6]	(Spain) Daniel Gimeno Traver (Spain) Iván Navarro	(Spain) Íñigo Cervantes Huegun (Colombia) Alejandro González	(Netherlands) Thomas Schoorel (Italy) Matteo Viola (United States) Daniel Kosakowski (Germany) Dominik Meffert
June 4	Aegon Trophy; Nottingham, Great Britain; Regular series Grass – €64,000 – 32S/32Q/16D; Singles – Doubles	(Germany) Benjamin Becker; 4–6, 6–1, 6–4	(Russia) Dmitry Tursunov	(United States) Robert Kendrick (Australia) Marinko Matosevic	(Lithuania) Ričardas Berankis (Russia) Igor Kunitsyn (Estonia) Jürgen Zopp (Slovakia) Lukáš Lacko
June 4	Aegon Trophy; Nottingham, Great Britain; Regular series Grass – €64,000 – 32S/32Q/16D; Singles – Doubles	(Philippines) Treat Conrad Huey (United Kingdom) Dominic Inglot; 6–4, 6–7^{(9–11)}, [10–8]	(United Kingdom) Jonathan Marray (Denmark) Frederik Nielsen	(United States) Robert Kendrick (Australia) Marinko Matosevic	(Lithuania) Ričardas Berankis (Russia) Igor Kunitsyn (Estonia) Jürgen Zopp (Slovakia) Lukáš Lacko
June 4	Franken Challenge; Fürth, Germany; Regular series Clay – €42,000+H – 32S/31Q/16D; Singles – Doubles	(Slovenia) Blaž Kavčič; 6–3, 2–6, 6–2	(Ukraine) Sergiy Stakhovsky	(Spain) Arnau Brugués Davi (France) Maxime Teixeira	(Austria) Andreas Haider-Maurer (Germany) Simon Greul (Czech Republic) Dušan Lojda (France) Jonathan Dasnières de Veigy
June 4	Franken Challenge; Fürth, Germany; Regular series Clay – €42,000+H – 32S/31Q/16D; Singles – Doubles	(Spain) Arnau Brugués Davi (Portugal) João Sousa; 7–5, 6–7^{(4–7)}, [11–9]	(Australia) Rameez Junaid (India) Purav Raja	(Spain) Arnau Brugués Davi (France) Maxime Teixeira	(Austria) Andreas Haider-Maurer (Germany) Simon Greul (Czech Republic) Dušan Lojda (France) Jonathan Dasnières de Veigy
June 11	Internazionali di Monza e Brianza; Monza, Italy; Regular series Clay – €85,000+H – 32S/19Q/16D; Singles – Doubles	(Spain) Daniel Gimeno Traver; 6–2, 4–6, 6–4	(Spain) Albert Montañés	(Slovenia) Blaž Kavčič (Argentina) Máximo González	(Italy) Matteo Viola (Croatia) Antonio Veić (Italy) Potito Starace (Italy) Filippo Volandri
June 11	Internazionali di Monza e Brianza; Monza, Italy; Regular series Clay – €85,000+H – 32S/19Q/16D; Singles – Doubles	(Kazakhstan) Andrey Golubev (Kazakhstan) Yuri Schukin; 7–6^{(7–4)}, 5–7, [10–7]	(Russia) Teymuraz Gabashvili (Italy) Stefano Ianni	(Slovenia) Blaž Kavčič (Argentina) Máximo González	(Italy) Matteo Viola (Croatia) Antonio Veić (Italy) Potito Starace (Italy) Filippo Volandri
June 11	Aegon Nottingham Challenge; Nottingham, Great Britain; Regular series Grass – €64,000 – 32S/32Q/16D; Singles – Doubles	(Slovenia) Grega Žemlja; 7–6^{(7–3)}, 4–6, 6–4	(Slovakia) Karol Beck	(United States) Jesse Levine (South Africa) Izak van der Merwe	(Israel) Dudi Sela (Australia) James Duckworth (Japan) Yūichi Sugita (Poland) Jerzy Janowicz
June 11	Aegon Nottingham Challenge; Nottingham, Great Britain; Regular series Grass – €64,000 – 32S/32Q/16D; Singles – Doubles	(France) Olivier Charroin (Austria) Martin Fischer; 6–4, 7–6^{(8–6)}	(Russia) Evgeny Donskoy (Russia) Andrey Kuznetsov	(United States) Jesse Levine (South Africa) Izak van der Merwe	(Israel) Dudi Sela (Australia) James Duckworth (Japan) Yūichi Sugita (Poland) Jerzy Janowicz
June 11	Košice Open; Košice, Slovakia; Regular series Clay – €30,000+H – 32S/32Q/16D; Singles – Doubles	(Slovenia) Aljaž Bedene; 7–6^{(7–1)}, 6–2	(Germany) Simon Greul	(Bosnia and Herzegovina) Damir Džumhur (Czech Republic) Jan Hájek	(Italy) Alessandro Giannessi (Slovakia) Miloslav Mečíř Jr. (Spain) Arnau Brugués Davi (Romania) Victor Crivoi
June 11	Košice Open; Košice, Slovakia; Regular series Clay – €30,000+H – 32S/32Q/16D; Singles – Doubles	(Poland) Tomasz Bednarek (Poland) Mateusz Kowalczyk; 2–6, 7–5, [14–12]	(Belarus) Uladzimir Ignatik (Belarus) Andrei Vasilevski	(Bosnia and Herzegovina) Damir Džumhur (Czech Republic) Jan Hájek	(Italy) Alessandro Giannessi (Slovakia) Miloslav Mečíř Jr. (Spain) Arnau Brugués Davi (Romania) Victor Crivoi
June 18	No tournaments scheduled.				
June 25	Marburg Open; Marburg, Germany; Regular series Clay – €30,000+H – 32S/29Q/16D; Singles – Doubles	(Czech Republic) Jan Hájek; 6–2, 6–2	(Austria) Andreas Haider-Maurer	(Romania) Marius Copil (Spain) Javier Martí	(Argentina) Horacio Zeballos (Russia) Teymuraz Gabashvili (Germany) Simon Greul (Germany) Mischa Zverev
June 25	Marburg Open; Marburg, Germany; Regular series Clay – €30,000+H – 32S/29Q/16D; Singles – Doubles	(Poland) Mateusz Kowalczyk (Czech Republic) David Škoch; 6–2, 6–1	(Russia) Denis Matsukevich (Germany) Mischa Zverev	(Romania) Marius Copil (Spain) Javier Martí	(Argentina) Horacio Zeballos (Russia) Teymuraz Gabashvili (Germany) Simon Greul (Germany) Mischa Zverev
June 25	Aspria Tennis Cup Trofeo City Life; Milan, Italy; Regular series Clay – €30,000+H – 32S/28Q/16D; Singles – Doubles	(Spain) Tommy Robredo; 6–3, 6–0	(Argentina) Martín Alund	(Romania) Victor Hănescu (Serbia) Nikola Ćirić	(Belgium) Yannick Mertens (Italy) Gianluca Naso (Italy) Walter Trusendi (Portugal) João Sousa
June 25	Aspria Tennis Cup Trofeo City Life; Milan, Italy; Regular series Clay – €30,000+H – 32S/28Q/16D; Singles – Doubles	(United States) Nicholas Monroe (Germany) Simon Stadler; 6–4, 3–6, [11–9]	(Kazakhstan) Andrey Golubev (Kazakhstan) Yuri Schukin	(Romania) Victor Hănescu (Serbia) Nikola Ćirić	(Belgium) Yannick Mertens (Italy) Gianluca Naso (Italy) Walter Trusendi (Portugal) João Sousa

=== July ===
Week of	Tournament	Champions	Runners-up	Semifinalists	Quarterfinalists
July 2	Sparkassen Open; Braunschweig, Germany; Regular series Clay – €106,500+H – 32S/26Q/16D; Singles – Doubles	(Brazil) Thomaz Bellucci; 7–6^{(7–4)}, 6–3	(Germany) Tobias Kamke	(Germany) Björn Phau (Italy) Simone Bolelli	(Germany) Jan-Lennard Struff (Argentina) Horacio Zeballos (Spain) Roberto Bautista Agut (Czech Republic) Jan Hájek
July 2	Sparkassen Open; Braunschweig, Germany; Regular series Clay – €106,500+H – 32S/26Q/16D; Singles – Doubles	(Poland) Tomasz Bednarek (Poland) Mateusz Kowalczyk; 7–5, 6–7^{(1–7)}, [10–8]	(Finland) Harri Heliövaara (Ukraine) Denys Molchanov	(Germany) Björn Phau (Italy) Simone Bolelli	(Germany) Jan-Lennard Struff (Argentina) Horacio Zeballos (Spain) Roberto Bautista Agut (Czech Republic) Jan Hájek
July 2	Nielsen Pro Tennis Championship; Winnetka, United States; Regular series Hard – $50,000 – 32S/24Q/16D; Singles – Doubles	(Australia) John-Patrick Smith; 3–6, 6–3, 7–6^{(7–3)}	(Lithuania) Ričardas Berankis	(Ukraine) Sergei Bubka (United States) Ryan Sweeting	(United States) Tennys Sandgren (Russia) Mikhail Ledovskikh (Switzerland) Marco Chiudinelli (Thailand) Danai Udomchoke
July 2	Nielsen Pro Tennis Championship; Winnetka, United States; Regular series Hard – $50,000 – 32S/24Q/16D; Singles – Doubles	(United States) Devin Britton (United States) Jeff Dadamo; 1–6, 6–2, [10–6]	(Australia) John Peers (Australia) John-Patrick Smith	(Ukraine) Sergei Bubka (United States) Ryan Sweeting	(United States) Tennys Sandgren (Russia) Mikhail Ledovskikh (Switzerland) Marco Chiudinelli (Thailand) Danai Udomchoke
July 2	BRD Arad Challenger; Arad, Romania; Regular series Clay – €30,000+H – 32S/32Q/16D; Singles – Doubles	(Argentina) Facundo Bagnis; 6–4, 6–4	(Romania) Victor Hănescu	(France) Augustin Gensse (Croatia) Antonio Veić	(Belgium) Yannick Mertens (Austria) Michael Linzer (Croatia) Toni Androić (Serbia) Boris Pašanski
July 2	BRD Arad Challenger; Arad, Romania; Regular series Clay – €30,000+H – 32S/32Q/16D; Singles – Doubles	(Croatia) Nikola Mektić (Croatia) Antonio Veić; 7–6^{(7–5)}, 4–6, [10–3]	(Croatia) Marin Draganja (Croatia) Dino Marcan	(France) Augustin Gensse (Croatia) Antonio Veić	(Belgium) Yannick Mertens (Austria) Michael Linzer (Croatia) Toni Androić (Serbia) Boris Pašanski
July 2	Lima Challenger; Lima, Peru; Regular series Clay – $50,000+H – 32S/22Q/16D; Singles – Doubles	(Argentina) Guido Andreozzi; 6–3, 6–7^{(6–8)}, 6–2	(Argentina) Facundo Argüello	(Argentina) Guido Pella (Argentina) Agustín Velotti	(France) Éric Prodon (Argentina) Andrés Molteni (Argentina) Diego Sebastián Schwartzman (Argentina) Diego Junqueira
July 2	Lima Challenger; Lima, Peru; Regular series Clay – $50,000+H – 32S/22Q/16D; Singles – Doubles	(Argentina) Facundo Argüello (Argentina) Agustín Velotti; 7–6^{(7–4)}, 7–6^{(7–5)}	(Italy) Claudio Grassi (Italy) Luca Vanni	(Argentina) Guido Pella (Argentina) Agustín Velotti	(France) Éric Prodon (Argentina) Andrés Molteni (Argentina) Diego Sebastián Schwartzman (Argentina) Diego Junqueira
July 2	Visit Panama Cup; Panama City, Panama; Regular series Clay – $35,000+H – 32S/16Q/16D; Singles – Doubles	(Brazil) Rogério Dutra da Silva; 6–3, 6–0	(Canada) Peter Polansky	(United States) Jesse Witten (Colombia) Carlos Salamanca	(Dominican Republic) Víctor Estrella (United States) Kevin Kim (Mexico) Luis Díaz Barriga (Ecuador) Júlio César Campozano
July 2	Visit Panama Cup; Panama City, Panama; Regular series Clay – $35,000+H – 32S/16Q/16D; Singles – Doubles	(Ecuador) Júlio César Campozano (Colombia) Alejandro González; 6–4, 7–5	(United States) Daniel Kosakowski (Canada) Peter Polansky	(United States) Jesse Witten (Colombia) Carlos Salamanca	(Dominican Republic) Víctor Estrella (United States) Kevin Kim (Mexico) Luis Díaz Barriga (Ecuador) Júlio César Campozano
July 9	Open Seguros Bolívar; Bogotá, Colombia; Regular series Clay – $125,000+H – 32S/31Q/16D; Singles – Doubles	(Colombia) Alejandro Falla; 7–5, 6–3	(Colombia) Santiago Giraldo	(Dominican Republic) Víctor Estrella (Ecuador) Júlio César Campozano	(Brazil) Marcelo Demoliner (Argentina) Facrundo Argüello (Chile) Jorge Aguilar (Italy) Luca Vanni
July 9	Open Seguros Bolívar; Bogotá, Colombia; Regular series Clay – $125,000+H – 32S/31Q/16D; Singles – Doubles	(Brazil) Marcelo Demoliner (Dominican Republic) Víctor Estrella; 6–4, 6–2	(Italy) Thomas Fabbiano (Italy) Riccardo Ghedin	(Dominican Republic) Víctor Estrella (Ecuador) Júlio César Campozano	(Brazil) Marcelo Demoliner (Argentina) Facrundo Argüello (Chile) Jorge Aguilar (Italy) Luca Vanni
July 9	The Hague Open; Scheveningen, Netherlands; Tretorn SERIE+ Clay – €42,500+H – 32S/27Q/16D; Singles – Doubles	(Poland) Jerzy Janowicz; 6–2, 6–2	(Netherlands) Matwé Middelkoop	(Germany) Peter Torebko (Argentina) Diego Junqueira	(Belgium) Yannick Mertens (Spain) Íñigo Cervantes Huegun (Netherlands) Thiemo de Bakker (Kazakhstan) Yuri Schukin
July 9	The Hague Open; Scheveningen, Netherlands; Tretorn SERIE+ Clay – €42,500+H – 32S/27Q/16D; Singles – Doubles	(Netherlands) Antal van der Duim (Netherlands) Boy Westerhof; 6–4, 5–7, [10–7]	(Australia) Rameez Junaid (Germany) Simon Stadler	(Germany) Peter Torebko (Argentina) Diego Junqueira	(Belgium) Yannick Mertens (Spain) Íñigo Cervantes Huegun (Netherlands) Thiemo de Bakker (Kazakhstan) Yuri Schukin
July 9	Carisap Tennis Cup; San Benedetto, Italy; Regular series Clay – €30,000+H – 32S/31Q/16D; Singles – Doubles	(Italy) Gianluca Naso; 6–4, 7–5	(Austria) Andreas Haider-Maurer	(Ukraine) Ivan Sergeyev (Spain) Sergio Gutiérrez Ferrol	(Switzerland) Michael Lammer (France) Jérôme Inzerillo (Slovakia) Andrej Martin (Spain) Arnau Brugués Davi
July 9	Carisap Tennis Cup; San Benedetto, Italy; Regular series Clay – €30,000+H – 32S/31Q/16D; Singles – Doubles	(Australia) Brydan Klein (Australia) Dane Propoggia; 3–6, 6–4, [12–10]	(Italy) Stefano Ianni (Italy) Gianluca Naso	(Ukraine) Ivan Sergeyev (Spain) Sergio Gutiérrez Ferrol	(Switzerland) Michael Lammer (France) Jérôme Inzerillo (Slovakia) Andrej Martin (Spain) Arnau Brugués Davi
July 9	BRD Timișoara Challenger; Timișoara, Romania; Regular series Clay – €30,000+H – 32S/10Q/16D; Singles – Doubles	(Romania) Victor Hănescu; 6–0, 6–3	(France) Guillaume Rufin	(Romania) Marius Copil (Croatia) Nikola Mektić	(Romania) Victor Crivoi (France) Grégoire Burquier (Argentina) Facundo Bagnis (Spain) Jordi Samper Montaña
July 9	BRD Timișoara Challenger; Timișoara, Romania; Regular series Clay – €30,000+H – 32S/10Q/16D; Singles – Doubles	(Montenegro) Goran Tošić (United States) Denis Zivkovic; 6–2, 7–5	(Romania) Andrei Dăescu (Romania) Florin Mergea	(Romania) Marius Copil (Croatia) Nikola Mektić	(Romania) Victor Crivoi (France) Grégoire Burquier (Argentina) Facundo Bagnis (Spain) Jordi Samper Montaña
July 16	ATP China International Tennis Challenge; Anning, China; Regular series Clay – $50,000 – 32S/32Q/16D; Singles – Doubles	(Slovenia) Grega Žemlja; 1–6, 7–5, 6–3	(Slovenia) Aljaž Bedene	(Chinese Taipei) Yang Tsung-hua (France) Laurent Rochette	(France) Josselin Ouanna (China) Zhang Ze (China) Chang Yu (Japan) Hiroki Moriya
July 16	ATP China International Tennis Challenge; Anning, China; Regular series Clay – $50,000 – 32S/32Q/16D; Singles – Doubles	(Thailand) Sanchai Ratiwatana (Thailand) Sonchat Ratiwatana; 4–6, 7–6^{(7–1)}, [13–11]	(South Africa) Ruan Roelofse (Thailand) Kittipong Wachiramanowong	(Chinese Taipei) Yang Tsung-hua (France) Laurent Rochette	(France) Josselin Ouanna (China) Zhang Ze (China) Chang Yu (Japan) Hiroki Moriya
July 16	SDA Tennis Open; Bercuit, Belgium; Regular series Clay – €42,500 – 32S/21Q/16D; Singles – Doubles	(Netherlands) Thiemo de Bakker; 6–4, 3–6, 7–5	(Romania) Victor Hănescu	(Belgium) Yannick Mertens (France) Stéphane Robert	(Canada) Steven Diez (France) Nicolas Devilder (Netherlands) Thomas Schoorel (Brazil) André Ghem
July 16	SDA Tennis Open; Bercuit, Belgium; Regular series Clay – €42,500 – 32S/21Q/16D; Singles – Doubles	(Brazil) André Ghem (Argentina) Marco Trungelliti; 6–1, 6–2	(Argentina) Facundo Bagnis (Argentina) Pablo Galdón	(Belgium) Yannick Mertens (France) Stéphane Robert	(Canada) Steven Diez (France) Nicolas Devilder (Netherlands) Thomas Schoorel (Brazil) André Ghem
July 16	Levene Gouldin & Thompson Tennis Challenger; Binghamton, United States; Regular series Hard – $50,500 – 32S/32Q/16D; Singles – Doubles	(United States) Michael Yani; 6–4, 7–6^{(13–11)}	(South Africa) Fritz Wolmarans	(New Zealand) Daniel King-Turner (Switzerland) Adrien Bossel	(United States) Rhyne Williams (United Kingdom) Jamie Baker (United States) Greg Ouellette (United States) Michael McClune
July 16	Levene Gouldin & Thompson Tennis Challenger; Binghamton, United States; Regular series Hard – $50,500 – 32S/32Q/16D; Singles – Doubles	(Israel) Dudi Sela (Israel) Harel Srugo; 6–2, 3–6, [10–8]	(Switzerland) Adrien Bossel (United States) Michael McClune	(New Zealand) Daniel King-Turner (Switzerland) Adrien Bossel	(United States) Rhyne Williams (United Kingdom) Jamie Baker (United States) Greg Ouellette (United States) Michael McClune
July 16	Challenger Banque Nationale de Granby; Granby, Canada; Regular series Hard – $50,000 – 32S/32Q/16D; Singles – Doubles	(Canada) Vasek Pospisil; 7–6^{(7–2)}, 6–4	(Netherlands) Igor Sijsling	(Canada) Philip Bester (Thailand) Danai Udomchoke	(Italy) Thomas Fabbiano (United States) Adam El Mihdawy (Australia) James Duckworth (Belgium) Maxime Authom
July 16	Challenger Banque Nationale de Granby; Granby, Canada; Regular series Hard – $50,000 – 32S/32Q/16D; Singles – Doubles	(Canada) Philip Bester (Canada) Vasek Pospisil; 6–1, 6–2	(Japan) Yuichi Ito (Japan) Takuto Niki	(Canada) Philip Bester (Thailand) Danai Udomchoke	(Italy) Thomas Fabbiano (United States) Adam El Mihdawy (Australia) James Duckworth (Belgium) Maxime Authom
July 16	Penza Cup; Penza, Russia; Regular series Hard – $50,000 – 32S/20Q/16D; Singles – Doubles	(Ukraine) Illya Marchenko; 7–5, 6–3	(Russia) Evgeny Donskoy	(Russia) Konstantin Kravchuk (Russia) Evgeny Kirillov	(France) Laurent Recouderc (Ukraine) Denys Molchanov (India) Yuki Bhambri (Slovakia) Kamil Čapkovič
July 16	Penza Cup; Penza, Russia; Regular series Hard – $50,000 – 32S/20Q/16D; Singles – Doubles	(Russia) Konstantin Kravchuk (Austria) Nikolaus Moser; 6–7^{(5–7)}, 6–3, [10–7]	(India) Yuki Bhambri (India) Divij Sharan	(Russia) Konstantin Kravchuk (Russia) Evgeny Kirillov	(France) Laurent Recouderc (Ukraine) Denys Molchanov (India) Yuki Bhambri (Slovakia) Kamil Čapkovič
July 16	Poznań Open; Poznań, Poland; Tretorn SERIE+ Clay – €30,000+H – 32S/23Q/16D; Singles – Doubles	(Poland) Jerzy Janowicz; 6–3, 6–3	(France) Jonathan Dasnières de Veigy	(Austria) Andreas Haider-Maurer (Argentina) Martín Alund	(Spain) Arnau Brugués Davi (Belarus) Uladzimir Ignatik (Poland) Marcin Gawron (France) Éric Prodon
July 16	Poznań Open; Poznań, Poland; Tretorn SERIE+ Clay – €30,000+H – 32S/23Q/16D; Singles – Doubles	(Australia) Rameez Junaid (Germany) Simon Stadler; 6–3, 6–4	(Australia) Adam Hubble (Australia) Nima Roshan	(Austria) Andreas Haider-Maurer (Argentina) Martín Alund	(Spain) Arnau Brugués Davi (Belarus) Uladzimir Ignatik (Poland) Marcin Gawron (France) Éric Prodon
July 16	Guzzini Challenger; Recanati, Italy; Regular series Hard – €30,000+H – 32S/24Q/16D; Singles – Doubles	(Italy) Simone Bolelli; 6–3, 6–2	(France) Fabrice Martin	(Kazakhstan) Evgeny Korolev (France) Kenny de Schepper	(Spain) Adrián Menéndez (Australia) Dane Propoggia (France) Florent Serra (France) Albano Olivetti
July 16	Guzzini Challenger; Recanati, Italy; Regular series Hard – €30,000+H – 32S/24Q/16D; Singles – Doubles	(Australia) Brydan Klein (Australia) Dane Propoggia; 7–5, 2–6, [14–12]	(Croatia) Marin Draganja (Croatia) Dino Marcan	(Kazakhstan) Evgeny Korolev (France) Kenny de Schepper	(Spain) Adrián Menéndez (Australia) Dane Propoggia (France) Florent Serra (France) Albano Olivetti
July 23	President's Cup; Astana, Kazakhstan; Regular series Hard – $125,000 – 32S/31Q/16D; Singles – Doubles	(Russia) Evgeny Donskoy; 6–3, 6–4	(Turkey) Marsel İlhan	(Australia) Brydan Klein (Slovakia) Karol Beck	(Ukraine) Oleksandr Nedovyesov (Ukraine) Illya Marchenko (Czech Republic) Michal Konečný (India) Yuki Bhambri
July 23	President's Cup; Astana, Kazakhstan; Regular series Hard – $125,000 – 32S/31Q/16D; Singles – Doubles	(Russia) Konstantin Kravchuk (Ukraine) Denys Molchanov; 6–4, 6–3	(Slovakia) Karol Beck (Slovakia) Kamil Čapkovič	(Australia) Brydan Klein (Slovakia) Karol Beck	(Ukraine) Oleksandr Nedovyesov (Ukraine) Illya Marchenko (Czech Republic) Michal Konečný (India) Yuki Bhambri
July 23	Fifth Third Bank Tennis Championships; Lexington, United States; Regular series Hard – $50,000 – 32S/32Q/16D; Singles – Doubles	(United States) Denis Kudla; 5–7, 7–5, 6–1	(Canada) Érik Chvojka	(United States) Christian Harrison (United Kingdom) Alex Bogdanovic	(Argentina) Agustín Velotti (Australia) Matt Reid (United States) Michael McClune (Australia) James Duckworth
July 23	Fifth Third Bank Tennis Championships; Lexington, United States; Regular series Hard – $50,000 – 32S/32Q/16D; Singles – Doubles	(United States) Austin Krajicek (Australia) John Peers; 6–1, 7–6^{(7–4)}	(United States) Tennys Sandgren (United States) Rhyne Williams	(United States) Christian Harrison (United Kingdom) Alex Bogdanovic	(Argentina) Agustín Velotti (Australia) Matt Reid (United States) Michael McClune (Australia) James Duckworth
July 23	Tampere Open; Tampere, Finland; Regular series Clay – €42,500 – 32S/29Q/16D; Singles – Doubles	(Portugal) João Sousa; 7–6^{(7–5)}, 6–4	(France) Éric Prodon	(Switzerland) Henri Laaksonen (Portugal) Gastão Elias	(Netherlands) Boy Westerhof (France) Jonathan Dasnières de Veigy (Sweden) Patrik Rosenholm (Belgium) Niels Desein
July 23	Tampere Open; Tampere, Finland; Regular series Clay – €42,500 – 32S/29Q/16D; Singles – Doubles	(Austria) Michael Linzer (Austria) Gerald Melzer; 6–1, 7–6^{(7–3)}	(Belgium) Niels Desein (Brazil) André Ghem	(Switzerland) Henri Laaksonen (Portugal) Gastão Elias	(Netherlands) Boy Westerhof (France) Jonathan Dasnières de Veigy (Sweden) Patrik Rosenholm (Belgium) Niels Desein
July 23	ATP China Challenger International; Wuhan, China; Regular series Hard – $50,000 – 32S/29Q/16D; Singles – Doubles	(Slovenia) Aljaž Bedene; 6–3, 4–6, 6–3	(France) Josselin Ouanna	(Australia) Adam Feeney (Chinese Taipei) Chen Ti	(France) Vincent Millot (France) Laurent Rochette (Monaco) Benjamin Balleret (China) Ze Zhang
July 23	ATP China Challenger International; Wuhan, China; Regular series Hard – $50,000 – 32S/29Q/16D; Singles – Doubles	(Thailand) Sanchai Ratiwatana (Thailand) Sonchat Ratiwatana; 6–4, 2–6,[10–8]	(Australia) Adam Feeney (Australia) Samuel Groth	(Australia) Adam Feeney (Chinese Taipei) Chen Ti	(France) Vincent Millot (France) Laurent Rochette (Monaco) Benjamin Balleret (China) Ze Zhang
July 23	Oberstaufen Cup; Oberstaufen, Germany; Regular series Clay – €30,000+H – 32S/12Q/16D; Singles – Doubles	(Germany) Dominik Meffert; 6–4, 6–3	(Germany) Nils Langer	(Russia) Andrey Kuznetsov (France) Guillaume Rufin	(Spain) Daniel Gimeno Traver (Argentina) Martín Alund (Argentina) Pablo Galdón (Germany) Matthias Bachinger
July 23	Oberstaufen Cup; Oberstaufen, Germany; Regular series Clay – €30,000+H – 32S/12Q/16D; Singles – Doubles	(Romania) Andrei Dăescu (Romania) Florin Mergea; 7–6^{(7–4)}, 7–6^{(7–1)}	(Russia) Andrey Kuznetsov (New Zealand) Jose Rubin Statham	(Russia) Andrey Kuznetsov (France) Guillaume Rufin	(Spain) Daniel Gimeno Traver (Argentina) Martín Alund (Argentina) Pablo Galdón (Germany) Matthias Bachinger
July 23	Orbetello Challenger; Orbetello, Italy; Regular series Clay – €30,000+H – 32S/29Q/16D; Singles – Doubles	(Spain) Roberto Bautista Agut; 6–3, 6–1	(Serbia) Dušan Lajović	(Italy) Alessio di Mauro (Italy) Matteo Viola	(Italy) Gianluca Naso (Kazakhstan) Evgeny Korolev (Spain) Sergio Gutiérrez Ferrol (Portugal) Pedro Sousa
July 23	Orbetello Challenger; Orbetello, Italy; Regular series Clay – €30,000+H – 32S/29Q/16D; Singles – Doubles	(Italy) Stefano Ianni (Australia) Dane Propoggia; 6–3, 6–2	(Italy) Alessio di Mauro (Italy) Simone Vagnozzi	(Italy) Alessio di Mauro (Italy) Matteo Viola	(Italy) Gianluca Naso (Kazakhstan) Evgeny Korolev (Spain) Sergio Gutiérrez Ferrol (Portugal) Pedro Sousa
July 30	Odlum Brown Vancouver Open; Vancouver, Canada; Regular series Hard – $100,000 – 32S/32Q/16D; Singles – Doubles	(Netherlands) Igor Sijsling; 6–1, 7–5	(Ukraine) Sergei Bubka	(Canada) Frank Dancevic (Israel) Dudi Sela	(Thailand) Danai Udomchoke (Belgium) Ruben Bemelmans (Chinese Taipei) Jimmy Wang (Canada) Steven Diez
July 30	Odlum Brown Vancouver Open; Vancouver, Canada; Regular series Hard – $100,000 – 32S/32Q/16D; Singles – Doubles	(Belgium) Maxime Authom (Belgium) Ruben Bemelmans; 6–4, 6–2	(Australia) John Peers (Australia) John-Patrick Smith	(Canada) Frank Dancevic (Israel) Dudi Sela	(Thailand) Danai Udomchoke (Belgium) Ruben Bemelmans (Chinese Taipei) Jimmy Wang (Canada) Steven Diez
July 30	Beijing International Challenger; Beijing, China; Regular series Hard – $75,000+H – 32S/32Q/16D; Singles – Doubles	(Slovenia) Grega Žemlja; 6–3, 6–0	(China) Wu Di	(Kazakhstan) Andrey Golubev (Slovakia) Karol Beck	(Slovenia) Aljaž Bedene (France) Vincent Millot (Chinese Taipei) Yang Tsung-hua (Japan) Yūichi Sugita
July 30	Beijing International Challenger; Beijing, China; Regular series Hard – $75,000+H – 32S/32Q/16D; Singles – Doubles	(Thailand) Sanchai Ratiwatana (Thailand) Sonchat Ratiwatana; 7–6^{(7–3)}, 2–6, [10–6]	(India) Yuki Bhambri (India) Divij Sharan	(Kazakhstan) Andrey Golubev (Slovakia) Karol Beck	(Slovenia) Aljaž Bedene (France) Vincent Millot (Chinese Taipei) Yang Tsung-hua (Japan) Yūichi Sugita
July 30	Manta Open; Manta, Ecuador; Regular series Hard – $35,000+H – 32S/32Q/16D; Singles – Doubles	(Argentina) Guido Pella; 6–4, 7–5	(Argentina) Maximiliano Estévez	(Chile) Jorge Aguilar (Argentina) Facundo Argüello	(Brazil) João Souza (Australia) Greg Jones (Dominican Republic) Víctor Estrella (Ecuador) Júlio César Campozano
July 30	Manta Open; Manta, Ecuador; Regular series Hard – $35,000+H – 32S/32Q/16D; Singles – Doubles	(Peru) Duilio Beretta (Argentina) Renzo Olivo; 6–3, 6–0	(Dominican Republic) Víctor Estrella (Brazil) João Souza	(Chile) Jorge Aguilar (Argentina) Facundo Argüello	(Brazil) João Souza (Australia) Greg Jones (Dominican Republic) Víctor Estrella (Ecuador) Júlio César Campozano

=== August ===
Week of	Tournament	Champions	Runners-up	Semifinalists	Quarterfinalists
August 6	Comerica Bank Challenger; Aptos, United States; Regular series Hard – $100,000 – 32S/32Q/16D; Singles – Doubles	(United States) Steve Johnson; 6–3, 6–3	(Colombia) Robert Farah	(Czech Republic) Jan Hernych (Serbia) Ilija Bozoljac	(Chinese Taipei) Jimmy Wang (South Africa) Rik de Voest (United States) Michael McClune (United States) Bradley Klahn
August 6	Comerica Bank Challenger; Aptos, United States; Regular series Hard – $100,000 – 32S/32Q/16D; Singles – Doubles	(South Africa) Rik de Voest (Australia) John Peers; 6–7^{(5–7)}, 6–1, [10–4]	(Australia) Chris Guccione (Germany) Frank Moser	(Czech Republic) Jan Hernych (Serbia) Ilija Bozoljac	(Chinese Taipei) Jimmy Wang (South Africa) Rik de Voest (United States) Michael McClune (United States) Bradley Klahn
August 6	San Marino CEPU Open; City of San Marino, San Marino; Tretorn SERIE+ Clay – €85,000+H – 32S/32Q/16D; Singles – Doubles	(Slovakia) Martin Kližan; 6–3, 6–1	(Italy) Simone Bolelli	(Italy) Filippo Volandri (Spain) Albert Montañés	(Croatia) Nikola Mektić (France) Stéphane Robert (Brazil) Rogério Dutra da Silva (Slovenia) Blaž Kavčič
August 6	San Marino CEPU Open; City of San Marino, San Marino; Tretorn SERIE+ Clay – €85,000+H – 32S/32Q/16D; Singles – Doubles	(Czech Republic) Lukáš Dlouhý (Slovakia) Michal Mertiňák; 2–6, 7–6^{(7–3)}, [11–9]	(Italy) Stefano Ianni (Italy) Matteo Viola	(Italy) Filippo Volandri (Spain) Albert Montañés	(Croatia) Nikola Mektić (France) Stéphane Robert (Brazil) Rogério Dutra da Silva (Slovenia) Blaž Kavčič
August 6	Open Diputación Ciudad de Pozoblanco; Pozoblanco, Spain; Tretorn SERIE+ Hard – €42,500+H – 32S/32Q/16D; Singles – Doubles	(Spain) Roberto Bautista Agut; 6–3, 6–4	(Spain) Arnau Brugués Davi	(France) Josselin Ouanna (Russia) Evgeny Donskoy	(Spain) Tommy Robredo (France) Adrian Mannarino (Italy) Riccardo Ghedin (Belarus) Uladzimir Ignatik
August 6	Open Diputación Ciudad de Pozoblanco; Pozoblanco, Spain; Tretorn SERIE+ Hard – €42,500+H – 32S/32Q/16D; Singles – Doubles	(Russia) Konstantin Kravchuk (Ukraine) Denys Molchanov; 6–3, 6–3	(France) Adrian Mannarino (France) Maxime Teixeira	(France) Josselin Ouanna (Russia) Evgeny Donskoy	(Spain) Tommy Robredo (France) Adrian Mannarino (Italy) Riccardo Ghedin (Belarus) Uladzimir Ignatik
August 6	BRD Sibiu Challenger; Sibiu, Romania; Regular series Clay – €30,000+H – 32S/32Q/16D; Singles – Doubles	(Romania) Adrian Ungur; 6–4, 7–6^{(7–1)}	(Romania) Victor Hănescu	(Portugal) João Sousa (France) David Guez	(Italy) Simone Vagnozzi (Austria) Andreas Haider-Maurer (Germany) Simon Greul (Croatia) Toni Androić
August 6	BRD Sibiu Challenger; Sibiu, Romania; Regular series Clay – €30,000+H – 32S/32Q/16D; Singles – Doubles	(Croatia) Marin Draganja (Croatia) Lovro Zovko; 6–4, 4–6, [11–9]	(Romania) Alexandru-Daniel Carpen (Chile) Cristóbal Saavedra Corvalán	(Portugal) João Sousa (France) David Guez	(Italy) Simone Vagnozzi (Austria) Andreas Haider-Maurer (Germany) Simon Greul (Croatia) Toni Androić
August 6	Samarkand Challenger; Samarkand, Uzbekistan; Regular series Clay – $35,000+H – 32S/32Q/16D; Singles – Doubles	(Serbia) Dušan Lajović; 6–3, 6–2	(Uzbekistan) Farrukh Dustov	(Ukraine) Oleksandr Nedovyesov (India) N.Sriram Balaji	(Austria) Gerald Melzer (Ukraine) Ivan Sergeyev (Slovakia) Andrej Martin (Kazakhstan) Andrey Golubev
August 6	Samarkand Challenger; Samarkand, Uzbekistan; Regular series Clay – $35,000+H – 32S/32Q/16D; Singles – Doubles	(Ukraine) Oleksandr Nedovyesov (Ukraine) Ivan Sergeyev; 6–4, 7–6^{(7–1)}	(India) Divij Sharan (India) Vishnu Vardhan	(Ukraine) Oleksandr Nedovyesov (India) N.Sriram Balaji	(Austria) Gerald Melzer (Ukraine) Ivan Sergeyev (Slovakia) Andrej Martin (Kazakhstan) Andrey Golubev
August 13	Zucchetti Kos Tennis Cup; Cordenons, Italy; Tretorn SERIE+ Clay – €85,000+H – 32S/32Q/16D; Singles – Doubles	(Italy) Paolo Lorenzi; 7–6^{(7–5)}, 6–3	(Spain) Daniel Gimeno Traver	(Italy) Filippo Volandri (Romania) Victor Hănescu	(Slovenia) Blaž Kavčič (Spain) Albert Montañés (Italy) Simone Bolelli (Italy) Matteo Viola
August 13	Zucchetti Kos Tennis Cup; Cordenons, Italy; Tretorn SERIE+ Clay – €85,000+H – 32S/32Q/16D; Singles – Doubles	(Czech Republic) Lukáš Dlouhý (Slovakia) Michal Mertiňák; 5–7, 7–5, [10–7]	(Germany) Philipp Marx (Romania) Florin Mergea	(Italy) Filippo Volandri (Romania) Victor Hănescu	(Slovenia) Blaž Kavčič (Spain) Albert Montañés (Italy) Simone Bolelli (Italy) Matteo Viola
August 13	Karshi Challenger; Qarshi, Uzbekistan; Regular series Hard – $50,000 – 32S/32Q/16D; Singles – Doubles	(Russia) Igor Kunitsyn; 7–6^{(12–10)}, 6–2	(Belarus) Dzmitry Zhyrmont	(Ukraine) Ivan Sergeyev (China) Wu Di	(Canada) Steven Diez (India) Vishnu Vardhan (Slovakia) Kamil Čapkovič (Serbia) Dušan Lajović
August 13	Karshi Challenger; Qarshi, Uzbekistan; Regular series Hard – $50,000 – 32S/32Q/16D; Singles – Doubles	(Chinese Taipei) Lee Hsin-han (Chinese Taipei) Peng Hsien-yin; 6–7^{(5–7)}, 6–4, [10–4]	(Australia) Brydan Klein (Japan) Yasutaka Uchiyama	(Ukraine) Ivan Sergeyev (China) Wu Di	(Canada) Steven Diez (India) Vishnu Vardhan (Slovakia) Kamil Čapkovič (Serbia) Dušan Lajović
August 20	Open Castilla y León; Segovia, Spain; Tretorn SERIE+ Hard – €64,000 – 32S/32Q/16D; Singles – Doubles	(Russia) Evgeny Donskoy; 6–1, 7–6^{(13–11)}	(France) Albano Olivetti	(Italy) Riccardo Ghedin (Russia) Konstantin Kravchuk	(Spain) Daniel Gimeno Traver (Croatia) Marin Draganja (Spain) Gerard Granollers (Spain) Andrés Artuñedo
August 20	Open Castilla y León; Segovia, Spain; Tretorn SERIE+ Hard – €64,000 – 32S/32Q/16D; Singles – Doubles	(Italy) Stefano Ianni (Romania) Florin Mergea; 6–2, 6–3	(Russia) Konstantin Kravchuk (Austria) Nikolaus Moser	(Italy) Riccardo Ghedin (Russia) Konstantin Kravchuk	(Spain) Daniel Gimeno Traver (Croatia) Marin Draganja (Spain) Gerard Granollers (Spain) Andrés Artuñedo
August 27	Chang-Sat Bangkok Open; Bangkok, Thailand; Regular series Hard – $50,000 – 32S/32Q/16D; Singles – Doubles	(Israel) Dudi Sela; 6–1, 7–5	(Japan) Yūichi Sugita	(Indonesia) Christopher Rungkat (China) Gong Maoxin	(Australia) John Millman (China) Zhang Ze (Australia) Matt Reid (Chinese Taipei) Huang Liang-chi
August 27	Chang-Sat Bangkok Open; Bangkok, Thailand; Regular series Hard – $50,000 – 32S/32Q/16D; Singles – Doubles	(India) Divij Sharan (India) Vishnu Vardhan; 6–3, 6–4	(Chinese Taipei) Lee Hsin-han (Chinese Taipei) Peng Hsien-yin	(Indonesia) Christopher Rungkat (China) Gong Maoxin	(Australia) John Millman (China) Zhang Ze (Australia) Matt Reid (Chinese Taipei) Huang Liang-chi
August 27	Città di Como Challenger; Como, Italy; Regular series Clay – €30,000+H – 32S/32Q/16D; Singles – Doubles	(Austria) Andreas Haider-Maurer; 6–3, 6–4	(Portugal) João Sousa	(Italy) Gianluca Naso (Kazakhstan) Evgeny Korolev	(Germany) Julian Reister (Italy) Alessandro Giannessi (Argentina) Facundo Argüello (Chile) Paul Capdeville
August 27	Città di Como Challenger; Como, Italy; Regular series Clay – €30,000+H – 32S/32Q/16D; Singles – Doubles	(Germany) Philipp Marx (Romania) Florin Mergea; 6–4, 4–6, [10–4]	(Australia) Colin Ebelthite (Czech Republic) Jaroslav Pospíšil	(Italy) Gianluca Naso (Kazakhstan) Evgeny Korolev	(Germany) Julian Reister (Italy) Alessandro Giannessi (Argentina) Facundo Argüello (Chile) Paul Capdeville

=== September ===
Week of	Tournament	Champions	Runners-up	Semifinalists	Quarterfinalists
September 3	AON Open Challenger; Genoa, Italy; Regular series Clay – €85,000+H – 32S/32Q/16D; Singles – Doubles	(Spain) Albert Montañés; 6–4, 6–1	(Spain) Tommy Robredo	(Italy) Filippo Volandri (Italy) Simone Bolelli	(Italy) Andreas Seppi (Spain) Sergio Gutiérrez Ferrol (Italy) Thomas Fabbiano (Italy) Walter Trusendi
September 3	AON Open Challenger; Genoa, Italy; Regular series Clay – €85,000+H – 32S/32Q/16D; Singles – Doubles	(Germany) Andre Begemann (Germany) Martin Emmrich; 6–3, 6–1	(Germany) Dominik Meffert (Austria) Philipp Oswald	(Italy) Filippo Volandri (Italy) Simone Bolelli	(Italy) Andreas Seppi (Spain) Sergio Gutiérrez Ferrol (Italy) Thomas Fabbiano (Italy) Walter Trusendi
September 3	TEAN International; Alphen aan den Rijn, Netherlands; Regular series Clay – €42,500 – 32S/32Q/16D; Singles – Doubles	(Netherlands) Thiemo de Bakker; 6–4, 6–2	(Germany) Simon Greul	(Portugal) João Sousa (Spain) Daniel Gimeno Traver	(Netherlands) Wesley Koolhof (Belgium) Yannick Mertens (Spain) Iván Navarro (Germany) Peter Torebko
September 3	TEAN International; Alphen aan den Rijn, Netherlands; Regular series Clay – €42,500 – 32S/32Q/16D; Singles – Doubles	(Australia) Rameez Junaid (Germany) Simon Stadler; 4–6, 6–1, [10–5]	(Germany) Simon Greul (Germany) Bastian Knittel	(Portugal) João Sousa (Spain) Daniel Gimeno Traver	(Netherlands) Wesley Koolhof (Belgium) Yannick Mertens (Spain) Iván Navarro (Germany) Peter Torebko
September 3	Shanghai Challenger; Shanghai, China; Regular series Hard – $50,000 – 32S/32Q/16D; Singles – Doubles	(Chinese Taipei) Lu Yen-hsun; 7–5, 6–0	(Germany) Peter Gojowczyk	(Japan) Yūichi Sugita (United States) Michael Yani	(India) Sanam Singh (China) Zhang Ze (Australia) John Millman (United Kingdom) James Ward
September 3	Shanghai Challenger; Shanghai, China; Regular series Hard – $50,000 – 32S/32Q/16D; Singles – Doubles	(Thailand) Sanchai Ratiwatana (Thailand) Sonchat Ratiwatana; 6–4, 6–4	(India) Yuki Bhambri (India) Divij Sharan	(Japan) Yūichi Sugita (United States) Michael Yani	(India) Sanam Singh (China) Zhang Ze (Australia) John Millman (United Kingdom) James Ward
September 3	Trophée des Alpilles; Saint-Rémy-de-Provence, France; Regular series Hard – €42,500 – 32S/32Q/16D; Singles – Doubles	(France) Josselin Ouanna; 6–4, 7–5	(Italy) Flavio Cipolla	(Belarus) Uladzimir Ignatik (Russia) Evgeny Donskoy	(Luxembourg) Gilles Müller (France) Adrian Mannarino (Germany) Matthias Bachinger (Russia) Igor Kunitsyn
September 3	Trophée des Alpilles; Saint-Rémy-de-Provence, France; Regular series Hard – €42,500 – 32S/32Q/16D; Singles – Doubles	(Lithuania) Laurynas Grigelis (Belarus) Uladzimir Ignatik; 6–7^{(4–7)}, 6–3, [10–6]	(Spain) Jordi Marsé-Vidri (Spain) Carles Poch Gradin	(Belarus) Uladzimir Ignatik (Russia) Evgeny Donskoy	(Luxembourg) Gilles Müller (France) Adrian Mannarino (Germany) Matthias Bachinger (Russia) Igor Kunitsyn
September 3	BRD Brașov Challenger; Brașov, Romania; Regular series Clay – €30,000+H – 32S/32Q/16D; Singles – Doubles	(Austria) Andreas Haider-Maurer; 3–6, 7–5, 6–2	(Romania) Adrian Ungur	(Serbia) Boris Pašanski (Croatia) Antonio Veić	(Romania) Victor Hănescu (Montenegro) Goran Tošić (Chile) Hans Podlipnik (Chile) Jorge Aguilar
September 3	BRD Brașov Challenger; Brașov, Romania; Regular series Clay – €30,000+H – 32S/32Q/16D; Singles – Doubles	(Romania) Marius Copil (Romania) Victor Crivoi; 6–7^{(8–10)}, 6–4, [12–10]	(Moldova) Andrei Ciumac (Ukraine) Oleksandr Nedovyesov	(Serbia) Boris Pašanski (Croatia) Antonio Veić	(Romania) Victor Hănescu (Montenegro) Goran Tošić (Chile) Hans Podlipnik (Chile) Jorge Aguilar
September 10	American Express – TED Open; Istanbul, Turkey; Regular series Hard – $75,000 – 32S/32Q/16D; Singles – Doubles	(Russia) Dmitry Tursunov; 6–4, 7–6^{(7–5)}	(France) Adrian Mannarino	(United States) Michael Russell (Slovenia) Grega Žemlja	(Tunisia) Malek Jaziri (France) Maxime Teixeira (Slovakia) Karol Beck (Spain) Adrián Menéndez
September 10	American Express – TED Open; Istanbul, Turkey; Regular series Hard – $75,000 – 32S/32Q/16D; Singles – Doubles	(Slovakia) Karol Beck (Czech Republic) Lukáš Dlouhý; 3–6, 6–2, [10–6]	(Spain) Adrián Menéndez (Australia) John Peers	(United States) Michael Russell (Slovenia) Grega Žemlja	(Tunisia) Malek Jaziri (France) Maxime Teixeira (Slovakia) Karol Beck (Spain) Adrián Menéndez
September 10	Seguros Bolívar Open Cali; Cali, Colombia; Regular series Clay – $75,000+H – 32S/32Q/16D; Singles – Doubles	(Brazil) João Souza; 6–2, 6–4	(Brazil) Thiago Alves	(Brazil) Fabiano de Paula (Argentina) Martín Alund	(Argentina) Guido Pella (United States) Wayne Odesnik (Spain) Rubén Ramírez Hidalgo (Colombia) Nicolás Barrientos
September 10	Seguros Bolívar Open Cali; Cali, Colombia; Regular series Clay – $75,000+H – 32S/32Q/16D; Singles – Doubles	(Colombia) Juan Sebastián Cabal (Colombia) Robert Farah; 6–3, 7–6^{(7–4)}	(Brazil) Marcelo Demoliner (Brazil) João Souza	(Brazil) Fabiano de Paula (Argentina) Martín Alund	(Argentina) Guido Pella (United States) Wayne Odesnik (Spain) Rubén Ramírez Hidalgo (Colombia) Nicolás Barrientos
September 10	ATP Roller Open; Pétange, Luxembourg; Regular series Hard – €64,000 (indoor) – 32S/32Q/16D; Singles – Doubles	(Germany) Tobias Kamke; 7–6^{(9–7)}, 6–4	(France) Paul-Henri Mathieu	(France) Édouard Roger-Vasselin (Estonia) Jürgen Zopp	(Belgium) Niels Desein (Croatia) Ivan Dodig (Czech Republic) Jan Hernych (Argentina) Horacio Zeballos
September 10	ATP Roller Open; Pétange, Luxembourg; Regular series Hard – €64,000 (indoor) – 32S/32Q/16D; Singles – Doubles	(Germany) Christopher Kas (Belgium) Dick Norman; 2–6, 6–2, [10–8]	(United Kingdom) Jamie Murray (Brazil) André Sá	(France) Édouard Roger-Vasselin (Estonia) Jürgen Zopp	(Belgium) Niels Desein (Croatia) Ivan Dodig (Czech Republic) Jan Hernych (Argentina) Horacio Zeballos
September 10	Banja Luka Challenger; Banja Luka, Bosnia and Herzegovina; Regular series Clay – €64,000+H – 32S/32Q/16D; Singles – Doubles	(Romania) Victor Hănescu; 6–4, 6–1	(Austria) Andreas Haider-Maurer	(Italy) Simone Vagnozzi (Ukraine) Ivan Sergeyev	(Germany) Steven Moneke (Croatia) Nikola Mektić (Germany) Simon Greul (Germany) Peter Torebko
September 10	Banja Luka Challenger; Banja Luka, Bosnia and Herzegovina; Regular series Clay – €64,000+H – 32S/32Q/16D; Singles – Doubles	(Croatia) Marin Draganja (Croatia) Lovro Zovko; 6–1, 6–1	(Australia) Colin Ebelthite (Czech Republic) Jaroslav Pospíšil	(Italy) Simone Vagnozzi (Ukraine) Ivan Sergeyev	(Germany) Steven Moneke (Croatia) Nikola Mektić (Germany) Simon Greul (Germany) Peter Torebko
September 10	Copa Sevilla; Sevilla, Spain; Regular series Clay – €42,500+H – 32S/32Q/16D; Singles – Doubles	(Spain) Daniel Gimeno Traver; 6–3, 6–2	(Spain) Tommy Robredo	(Spain) Íñigo Cervantes Huegun (Serbia) Boris Pašanski	(Argentina) Facundo Argüello (Ukraine) Oleksandr Nedovyesov (Germany) Jan-Lennard Struff (Spain) Javier Martí
September 10	Copa Sevilla; Sevilla, Spain; Regular series Clay – €42,500+H – 32S/32Q/16D; Singles – Doubles	(Serbia) Nikola Ćirić (Serbia) Boris Pašanski; 5–7, 6–4, [10–6]	(Netherlands) Stephan Fransen (Netherlands) Jesse Huta Galung	(Spain) Íñigo Cervantes Huegun (Serbia) Boris Pašanski	(Argentina) Facundo Argüello (Ukraine) Oleksandr Nedovyesov (Germany) Jan-Lennard Struff (Spain) Javier Martí
September 10	Ningbo Challenger; Ningbo, China; Regular series Hard – $50,000+H – 32S/32Q/16D; Singles – Doubles	(Germany) Peter Gojowczyk; 6–3, 6–1	(South Korea) Jeong Suk-Young	(Chinese Taipei) Chen Ti (China) Wu Di	(Chinese Taipei) Lu Yen-hsun (Switzerland) Stéphane Bohli (Chinese Taipei) Yi Chu-huan (China) Zhang Ze
September 10	Ningbo Challenger; Ningbo, China; Regular series Hard – $50,000+H – 32S/32Q/16D; Singles – Doubles	(Thailand) Sanchai Ratiwatana (Thailand) Sonchat Ratiwatana; 6–4, 6–2	(China) Gong Maoxin (China) Zhang Ze	(Chinese Taipei) Chen Ti (China) Wu Di	(Chinese Taipei) Lu Yen-hsun (Switzerland) Stéphane Bohli (Chinese Taipei) Yi Chu-huan (China) Zhang Ze
September 10	Internazionali di Tennis dell'Umbria; Todi, Italy; Regular series Clay – €30,000+H – 32S/32Q/16D; Singles – Doubles	(Russia) Andrey Kuznetsov; 6–3, 2–0 retired	(Italy) Paolo Lorenzi	(Italy) Alessio di Mauro (Germany) Dominik Meffert	(France) Guillaume Rufin (Germany) Bastian Knittel (Italy) Matteo Viola (Australia) Jason Kubler
September 10	Internazionali di Tennis dell'Umbria; Todi, Italy; Regular series Clay – €30,000+H – 32S/32Q/16D; Singles – Doubles	(Austria) Martin Fischer (Austria) Philipp Oswald; 6–3, 6–2	(Italy) Marco Cecchinato (Italy) Alessio di Mauro	(Italy) Alessio di Mauro (Germany) Dominik Meffert	(France) Guillaume Rufin (Germany) Bastian Knittel (Italy) Matteo Viola (Australia) Jason Kubler
September 17	Pekao Szczecin Open; Szczecin, Poland; Trtorn SERIE+ Clay – €106,500+H – 32S/32Q/16D; Singles – Doubles	(Romania) Victor Hănescu; 6–4, 7–5	(Spain) Íñigo Cervantes Huegun	(France) Jonathan Dasnières de Veigy (Ukraine) Ivan Sergeyev	(Germany) Simon Greul (Spain) Daniel Muñoz de la Nava (Poland) Jerzy Janowicz (Argentina) Guido Andreozzi
September 17	Pekao Szczecin Open; Szczecin, Poland; Trtorn SERIE+ Clay – €106,500+H – 32S/32Q/16D; Singles – Doubles	(Germany) Andre Begemann (Germany) Martin Emmrich; 3–6, 6–1, [10–3]	(Poland) Tomasz Bednarek (Poland) Mateusz Kowalczyk	(France) Jonathan Dasnières de Veigy (Ukraine) Ivan Sergeyev	(Germany) Simon Greul (Spain) Daniel Muñoz de la Nava (Poland) Jerzy Janowicz (Argentina) Guido Andreozzi
September 17	Türk Telecom İzmir Cup; İzmir, Turkey; Regular series Hard – €64,000 – 32S/32Q/16D; Singles – Doubles	(Russia) Dmitry Tursunov; 7–6^{(7–4)}, 6–7^{(5–7)}, 6–3	(Ukraine) Illya Marchenko	(United States) Steve Johnson (Slovakia) Karol Beck	(United States) Denis Kudla (Republic of Ireland) James McGee (Turkey) Marsel İlhan (United States) Michael Russell
September 17	Türk Telecom İzmir Cup; İzmir, Turkey; Regular series Hard – €64,000 – 32S/32Q/16D; Singles – Doubles	(United Kingdom) David Rice (United Kingdom) Sean Thornley; 7–6^{(10–8)}, 6–2	(Australia) Brydan Klein (Australia) Dane Propoggia	(United States) Steve Johnson (Slovakia) Karol Beck	(United States) Denis Kudla (Republic of Ireland) James McGee (Turkey) Marsel İlhan (United States) Michael Russell
September 17	Arimex Challenger Trophy; Trnava, Slovakia; Regular series Clay – €64,000 – 32S/32Q/16D; Singles – Doubles	(Russia) Andrey Kuznetsov; 6–3, 6–3	(Romania) Adrian Ungur	(Portugal) João Sousa (Italy) Matteo Viola	(Germany) Julian Reister (France) Stéphane Robert (Austria) Andreas Haider-Maurer (Slovakia) Andrej Martin
September 17	Arimex Challenger Trophy; Trnava, Slovakia; Regular series Clay – €64,000 – 32S/32Q/16D; Singles – Doubles	(Serbia) Nikola Ćirić (Montenegro) Goran Tošić; 7–6^{(7–0)}, 7–5	(Croatia) Mate Pavić (Croatia) Franko Škugor	(Portugal) João Sousa (Italy) Matteo Viola	(Germany) Julian Reister (France) Stéphane Robert (Austria) Andreas Haider-Maurer (Slovakia) Andrej Martin
September 17	Tetra Pak Tennis Cup; Campinas, Brazil; Regular series Clay – $50,000 – 32S/32Q/16D; Singles – Doubles	(Argentina) Guido Pella; 6–4, 6–0	(Brazil) Leonardo Kirche	(Russia) Alex Bogomolov Jr. (Brazil) Thiago Alves	(Brazil) João Souza (Argentina) Máximo González (Argentina) Martín Alund (Brazil) André Ghem
September 17	Tetra Pak Tennis Cup; Campinas, Brazil; Regular series Clay – $50,000 – 32S/32Q/16D; Singles – Doubles	(Brazil) Marcelo Demoliner (Brazil) João Souza; 6–1, 7–5	(Uruguay) Marcel Felder (Argentina) Máximo González	(Russia) Alex Bogomolov Jr. (Brazil) Thiago Alves	(Brazil) João Souza (Argentina) Máximo González (Argentina) Martín Alund (Brazil) André Ghem
September 24	Open d'Orléans; Orléans, France; Regular series Hard (indoor) – €106,500+H – 32S/32Q/16D; Singles – Doubles	(Belgium) David Goffin; 6–4, 3–6, 6–3	(Belgium) Ruben Bemelmans	(Spain) Roberto Bautista Agut (France) Josselin Ouanna	(France) Édouard Roger-Vasselin (Latvia) Ernests Gulbis (Belgium) Xavier Malisse (United States) Jesse Levine
September 24	Open d'Orléans; Orléans, France; Regular series Hard (indoor) – €106,500+H – 32S/32Q/16D; Singles – Doubles	(Czech Republic) Lukáš Dlouhý (Luxembourg) Gilles Müller; 6–2, 6–7^{(5–7)}, [10–7]	(Belgium) Xavier Malisse (United Kingdom) Ken Skupski	(Spain) Roberto Bautista Agut (France) Josselin Ouanna	(France) Édouard Roger-Vasselin (Latvia) Ernests Gulbis (Belgium) Xavier Malisse (United States) Jesse Levine
September 24	Torneo Omnia Tenis Ciudad Madrid; Madrid, Spain; Regular series Clay – €42,500 – 32S/32Q/16D; Singles – Doubles	(Spain) Daniel Gimeno Traver; 6–4, 6–2	(Germany) Jan-Lennard Struff	(Spain) Sergio Gutiérrez Ferrol (Spain) Rubén Ramírez Hidalgo	(Italy) Filippo Volandri (Argentina) Federico Delbonis (United Kingdom) Alexander Ward (Spain) Adrián Menéndez
September 24	Torneo Omnia Tenis Ciudad Madrid; Madrid, Spain; Regular series Clay – €42,500 – 32S/32Q/16D; Singles – Doubles	(Spain) Daniel Gimeno Traver (Spain) Iván Navarro; 6–2, 4–6, [10–7]	(Australia) Colin Ebelthite (Czech Republic) Jaroslav Pospíšil	(Spain) Sergio Gutiérrez Ferrol (Spain) Rubén Ramírez Hidalgo	(Italy) Filippo Volandri (Argentina) Federico Delbonis (United Kingdom) Alexander Ward (Spain) Adrián Menéndez
September 24	Lermontov Cup; Lermontov, Russia; Regular series Clay – €50,000+H – 32S/32Q/16D; Singles – Doubles	(Russia) Andrey Kuznetsov; 6–7^{(7–9)}, 6–2, 6–2	(Uzbekistan) Farrukh Dustov	(Serbia) Boris Pašanski (Ukraine) Oleksandr Nedovyesov	(Ukraine) Ivan Sergeyev (Kazakhstan) Andrey Golubev (Kazakhstan) Yuri Schukin (Italy) Thomas Fabbiano
September 24	Lermontov Cup; Lermontov, Russia; Regular series Clay – €50,000+H – 32S/32Q/16D; Singles – Doubles	(Russia) Konstantin Kravchuk (Ukraine) Denys Molchanov; 6–3, 6–4	(Kazakhstan) Andrey Golubev (Kazakhstan) Yuri Schukin	(Serbia) Boris Pašanski (Ukraine) Oleksandr Nedovyesov	(Ukraine) Ivan Sergeyev (Kazakhstan) Andrey Golubev (Kazakhstan) Yuri Schukin (Italy) Thomas Fabbiano

=== October ===
Week of	Tournament	Champions	Runners-up	Semifinalists	Quarterfinalists
October 1	Ethias Trophy; Mons, Belgium; Tretorn SERIE+ Hard (indoor) – €106,500+H – 32S/32Q/16D; Singles – Doubles	(France) Kenny de Schepper; 7–6^{(9–7)}, 4–6, 7–6^{(7–4)}	(France) Michaël Llodra	(Germany) Tobias Kamke (Belgium) Olivier Rochus	(Netherlands) Igor Sijsling (Poland) Jerzy Janowicz (Belgium) Maxime Authom (France) Édouard Roger-Vasselin
October 1	Ethias Trophy; Mons, Belgium; Tretorn SERIE+ Hard (indoor) – €106,500+H – 32S/32Q/16D; Singles – Doubles	(Poland) Tomasz Bednarek (Poland) Jerzy Janowicz; 7–5, 4–6, [10–2]	(France) Michaël Llodra (France) Édouard Roger-Vasselin	(Germany) Tobias Kamke (Belgium) Olivier Rochus	(Netherlands) Igor Sijsling (Poland) Jerzy Janowicz (Belgium) Maxime Authom (France) Édouard Roger-Vasselin
October 1	Natomas Men's Professional Tennis Tournament; Sacramento, United States; Regular series Hard – $100,000– 32S/32Q/16D; Singles – Doubles	(United States) James Blake; 6–1, 1–6, 6–4	(Germany) Mischa Zverev	(United States) Daniel Kosakowski (United States) Bobby Reynolds	(Italy) Matteo Viola (United States) Tennys Sandgren (Italy) Luca Vanni (United States) Bradley Klahn
October 1	Natomas Men's Professional Tennis Tournament; Sacramento, United States; Regular series Hard – $100,000– 32S/32Q/16D; Singles – Doubles	(United States) Tennys Sandgren (United States) Rhyne Williams; 4–6, 6–4, [12–10]	(United States) Devin Britton (United States) Austin Krajicek	(United States) Daniel Kosakowski (United States) Bobby Reynolds	(Italy) Matteo Viola (United States) Tennys Sandgren (Italy) Luca Vanni (United States) Bradley Klahn
October 1	Campeonato Internacional de Tênis do Estado do Pará; Belém, Brazil; Regular series Hard – $35,000+H – 32S/32Q/16D; Singles – Doubles	(Brazil) Ricardo Hocevar; 7–6^{(7–1)}, 7–6^{(7–4)}	(Netherlands) Thiemo de Bakker	(Brazil) Guilherme Clezar (Brazil) Rogério Dutra da Silva	(Brazil) Leonardo Kirche (Chile) Jorge Aguilar (Argentina) Agustín Velotti (Brazil) José Pereira
October 1	Campeonato Internacional de Tênis do Estado do Pará; Belém, Brazil; Regular series Hard – $35,000+H – 32S/32Q/16D; Singles – Doubles	(Australia) John Peers (Australia) John-Patrick Smith; 6–3, 6–2	(United States) Nicholas Monroe (Germany) Simon Stadler	(Brazil) Guilherme Clezar (Brazil) Rogério Dutra da Silva	(Brazil) Leonardo Kirche (Chile) Jorge Aguilar (Argentina) Agustín Velotti (Brazil) José Pereira
October 1	Quito Challenger; Quito, Ecuador; Regular series Clay – $35,000+H – 32S/32Q/16D; Singles – Doubles	(Brazil) João Souza; 6–2, 7–6^{(7–4)}	(France) Guillaume Rufin	(Chile) Nicolás Massú (Argentina) Martín Alund	(Argentina) Eduardo Schwank (Dominican Republic) Víctor Estrella (Argentina) Andrés Molteni (Colombia) Juan Sebastián Cabal
October 1	Quito Challenger; Quito, Ecuador; Regular series Clay – $35,000+H – 32S/32Q/16D; Singles – Doubles	(Colombia) Juan Sebastián Cabal (Colombia) Carlos Salamanca; 7–6^{(9–7)}, 7–6^{(7–4)}	(Brazil) Marcelo Demoliner (Brazil) João Souza	(Chile) Nicolás Massú (Argentina) Martín Alund	(Argentina) Eduardo Schwank (Dominican Republic) Víctor Estrella (Argentina) Andrés Molteni (Colombia) Juan Sebastián Cabal
October 8	Tashkent Challenger; Tashkent, Uzbekistan; Regular series Hard – $125,000+H – 32S/32Q/16D; Singles – Doubles	(Belarus) Uladzimir Ignatik; 6–3, 7–6^{(7–3)}	(Slovakia) Lukáš Lacko	(Croatia) Ivan Dodig (Czech Republic) Jan Mertl	(Israel) Amir Weintraub (Israel) Dudi Sela (Serbia) Dušan Lajović (Uzbekistan) Farrukh Dustov
October 8	Tashkent Challenger; Tashkent, Uzbekistan; Regular series Hard – $125,000+H – 32S/32Q/16D; Singles – Doubles	(Germany) Andre Begemann (Germany) Martin Emmrich; 6–7^{(2–7)}, 7–6^{(7–2)}, [10–8]	(Australia) Rameez Junaid (Germany) Frank Moser	(Croatia) Ivan Dodig (Czech Republic) Jan Mertl	(Israel) Amir Weintraub (Israel) Dudi Sela (Serbia) Dušan Lajović (Uzbekistan) Farrukh Dustov
October 8	Tiburon Challenger; Tiburon, United States; Regular series Hard – $100,000 – 32S/32Q/16D; Singles – Doubles	(United States) Jack Sock; 6–1, 1–6, 7–6^{(7–3)}	(Germany) Mischa Zverev	(United States) Steve Johnson (United States) Bobby Reynolds	(United States) Rhyne Williams (United States) Denis Kudla (United States) Bradley Klahn (United States) James Blake
October 8	Tiburon Challenger; Tiburon, United States; Regular series Hard – $100,000 – 32S/32Q/16D; Singles – Doubles	(South Africa) Rik de Voest (Australia) Chris Guccione; 6–1, 6–4	(Australia) Jordan Kerr (Sweden) Andreas Siljeström	(United States) Steve Johnson (United States) Bobby Reynolds	(United States) Rhyne Williams (United States) Denis Kudla (United States) Bradley Klahn (United States) James Blake
October 8	Open de Rennes; Rennes, France; Regular series Hard (indoor) – €42,500+H – 32S/32Q/16D; Singles – Doubles	(France) Kenny de Schepper; 7–6^{(7–4)}, 6–2	(Ukraine) Illya Marchenko	(Belgium) Maxime Authom (Belgium) Olivier Rochus	(Austria) Martin Fischer (Austria) Dominic Thiem (France) Marc Gicquel (France) Charles-Antoine Brézac
October 8	Open de Rennes; Rennes, France; Regular series Hard (indoor) – €42,500+H – 32S/32Q/16D; Singles – Doubles	(Germany) Philipp Marx (Romania) Florin Mergea; 6–3, 6–2	(Poland) Tomasz Bednarek (Poland) Mateusz Kowalczyk	(Belgium) Maxime Authom (Belgium) Olivier Rochus	(Austria) Martin Fischer (Austria) Dominic Thiem (France) Marc Gicquel (France) Charles-Antoine Brézac
October 8	Copa San Juan Gobierno; San Juan, Argentina; Regular series Clay – $35,000+H – 32S/32Q/16D; Singles – Doubles	(Netherlands) Thiemo de Bakker; 6–2, 3–6, 6–2	(Argentina) Martín Alund	(France) Guillaume Rufin (Spain) Iván Navarro	(Argentina) Máximo González (Netherlands) Boy Westerhof (Brazil) Rogério Dutra da Silva (Portugal) Gastão Elias
October 8	Copa San Juan Gobierno; San Juan, Argentina; Regular series Clay – $35,000+H – 32S/32Q/16D; Singles – Doubles	(Argentina) Martín Alund (Argentina) Horacio Zeballos; 3–6, 6–2, [14–12]	(United States) Nicholas Monroe (Germany) Simon Stadler	(France) Guillaume Rufin (Spain) Iván Navarro	(Argentina) Máximo González (Netherlands) Boy Westerhof (Brazil) Rogério Dutra da Silva (Portugal) Gastão Elias
October 15	Peugeot Tennis Cup; Rio de Janeiro, Brazil; Regular series Clay – $50,000+H – 32S/32Q/16D; Singles – Doubles	(Portugal) Gastão Elias; 6–3, 7–5	(Serbia) Boris Pašanski	(Argentina) Guido Pella (Portugal) João Sousa	(Croatia) Antonio Veić (Brazil) Ricardo Mello (Brazil) André Ghem (Netherlands) Thiemo de Bakker
October 15	Peugeot Tennis Cup; Rio de Janeiro, Brazil; Regular series Clay – $50,000+H – 32S/32Q/16D; Singles – Doubles	(Brazil) Marcelo Demoliner (Brazil) João Souza; 6–2, 6–4	(Portugal) Frederico Gil (Portugal) Pedro Sousa	(Argentina) Guido Pella (Portugal) João Sousa	(Croatia) Antonio Veić (Brazil) Ricardo Mello (Brazil) André Ghem (Netherlands) Thiemo de Bakker
October 15	Copa Agco Cordoba; Villa Allende, Argentina; Regular series Clay – $50,000 – 32S/32Q/16D; Singles – Doubles	(France) Guillaume Rufin; 6–2, 6–3	(Spain) Javier Martí	(Argentina) Leonardo Mayer (Argentina) Horacio Zeballos	(Argentina) Renzo Olivo (Argentina) Guido Andreozzi (Argentina) Andrea Collarini (Argentina) Martín Alund
October 15	Copa Agco Cordoba; Villa Allende, Argentina; Regular series Clay – $50,000 – 32S/32Q/16D; Singles – Doubles	(Argentina) Facundo Bagnis (Argentina) Diego Junqueira; 6–1, 6–2	(Uruguay) Ariel Behar (Argentina) Guillermo Durán	(Argentina) Leonardo Mayer (Argentina) Horacio Zeballos	(Argentina) Renzo Olivo (Argentina) Guido Andreozzi (Argentina) Andrea Collarini (Argentina) Martín Alund
October 22	Samsung Securities Cup; Seoul, South Korea; Regular series Hard – $100,000+H – 32S/32Q/16D; Singles – Doubles	(Chinese Taipei) Lu Yen-hsun; 6–3, 7–6^{(7–4)}	(Japan) Yūichi Sugita	(Thailand) Danai Udomchoke (Chinese Taipei) Jimmy Wang	(Belarus) Uladzimir Ignatik (France) Kenny de Schepper (South Korea) Nam Ji-sung (South Korea) Lim Yong-Kyu
October 22	Samsung Securities Cup; Seoul, South Korea; Regular series Hard – $100,000+H – 32S/32Q/16D; Singles – Doubles	(Chinese Taipei) Lee Hsin-han (Chinese Taipei) Peng Hsien-yin; 7–6^{(7–3)}, 7–5	(South Korea) Lim Yong-Kyu (South Korea) Nam Ji-sung	(Thailand) Danai Udomchoke (Chinese Taipei) Jimmy Wang	(Belarus) Uladzimir Ignatik (France) Kenny de Schepper (South Korea) Nam Ji-sung (South Korea) Lim Yong-Kyu
October 22	Copa Topper; Buenos Aires, Argentina; Regular series Clay – $75,000 – 32S/32Q/16D; Singles – Doubles	(Argentina) Diego Schwartzman; 6–1, 7–5	(France) Guillaume Rufin	(Argentina) Marco Trungelliti (Argentina) Agustín Velotti	(Argentina) Leonardo Mayer (Brazil) Rogério Dutra da Silva (Argentina) Martín Alund (Argentina) Leandro Migani
October 22	Copa Topper; Buenos Aires, Argentina; Regular series Clay – $75,000 – 32S/32Q/16D; Singles – Doubles	(Argentina) Martín Alund (Argentina) Horacio Zeballos; 7–6^{(8–6)}, 6–2	(Argentina) Facundo Argüello (Argentina) Agustín Velotti	(Argentina) Marco Trungelliti (Argentina) Agustín Velotti	(Argentina) Leonardo Mayer (Brazil) Rogério Dutra da Silva (Argentina) Martín Alund (Argentina) Leandro Migani
October 22	Aberto de Tênis do Rio Grande do Sul; Porto Alegre, Brazil; Regular series Clay – $35,000+H – 32S/32Q/16D; Singles – Doubles	(Germany) Simon Greul; 2–6, 7–6^{(7–5)}, 7–5	(Portugal) Gastão Elias	(Spain) Rubén Ramírez Hidalgo (Netherlands) Thomas Schoorel	(Brazil) Thiago Alves (United States) Wayne Odesnik (Brazil) Leonardo Kirche (Brazil) Júlio Silva
October 22	Aberto de Tênis do Rio Grande do Sul; Porto Alegre, Brazil; Regular series Clay – $35,000+H – 32S/32Q/16D; Singles – Doubles	(Brazil) Marcelo Demoliner (Brazil) João Souza; 6–3, 3–6, [10–7]	(Germany) Simon Greul (Italy) Alessandro Motti	(Spain) Rubén Ramírez Hidalgo (Netherlands) Thomas Schoorel	(Brazil) Thiago Alves (United States) Wayne Odesnik (Brazil) Leonardo Kirche (Brazil) Júlio Silva
October 29	Geneva Open presented by IPP; Geneva, Switzerland; Regular series Hard (indoor) – €64,000+H – 32S/32Q/16D; Singles – Doubles	(France) Marc Gicquel; 3–6, 6–3, 6–4	(Germany) Matthias Bachinger	(Switzerland) Henri Laaksonen (Romania) Marius Copil	(Belgium) Olivier Rochus (Ukraine) Illya Marchenko (France) Jonathan Eysseric (Switzerland) Stéphane Bohli
October 29	Geneva Open presented by IPP; Geneva, Switzerland; Regular series Hard (indoor) – €64,000+H – 32S/32Q/16D; Singles – Doubles	(Sweden) Johan Brunström (South Africa) Raven Klaasen; 7–6^{(7–2)}, 6–7^{(5–7)}, [10–5]	(Germany) Philipp Marx (Romania) Florin Mergea	(Switzerland) Henri Laaksonen (Romania) Marius Copil	(Belgium) Olivier Rochus (Ukraine) Illya Marchenko (France) Jonathan Eysseric (Switzerland) Stéphane Bohli
October 29	Charlottesville Men's Pro Challenger; Charlottesville, United States; Regular series Hard (indoor) – $75,000 – 32S/32Q/16D; Singles – Doubles	(United States) Denis Kudla; 6–0, 6–3	(United States) Alex Kuznetsov	(South Africa) Izak van der Merwe (Russia) Alex Bogomolov Jr.	(Australia) John-Patrick Smith (India) Somdev Devvarman (United States) Bradley Klahn (United States) Rhyne Williams
October 29	Charlottesville Men's Pro Challenger; Charlottesville, United States; Regular series Hard (indoor) – $75,000 – 32S/32Q/16D; Singles – Doubles	(Australia) John Peers (Australia) John-Patrick Smith; 7–5, 6–1	(United States) Jarmere Jenkins (United States) Jack Sock	(South Africa) Izak van der Merwe (Russia) Alex Bogomolov Jr.	(Australia) John-Patrick Smith (India) Somdev Devvarman (United States) Bradley Klahn (United States) Rhyne Williams
October 29	Seguros Bolívar Open Medellín; Medellín, Colombia; Regular series Clay – $50,000+H – 32S/32Q/16D; Singles – Doubles	(Italy) Paolo Lorenzi; 7–6^{(7–5)}, 6–7^{(4–7)}, 6–4	(Argentina) Leonardo Mayer	(Colombia) Juan Sebastián Cabal (Brazil) Fabiano de Paula	(Brazil) João Souza (Colombia) Nicolás Barrientos (United States) Wayne Odesnik (Portugal) Frederico Gil
October 29	Seguros Bolívar Open Medellín; Medellín, Colombia; Regular series Clay – $50,000+H – 32S/32Q/16D; Singles – Doubles	(United States) Nicholas Monroe (Germany) Simon Stadler; 6–4, 6–4	(Argentina) Renzo Olivo (Argentina) Marco Trungelliti	(Colombia) Juan Sebastián Cabal (Brazil) Fabiano de Paula	(Brazil) João Souza (Colombia) Nicolás Barrientos (United States) Wayne Odesnik (Portugal) Frederico Gil
October 29	Uruguay Open; Montevideo, Uruguay; Regular series Clay – $50,000 – 32S/32Q/16D; Singles – Doubles	(Argentina) Horacio Zeballos; 6–3, 6–2	(Germany) Julian Reister	(Argentina) Agustín Velotti (Romania) Adrian Ungur	(Argentina) Máximo González (Croatia) Antonio Veić (Serbia) Boris Pašanski (Uruguay) Marcel Felder
October 29	Uruguay Open; Montevideo, Uruguay; Regular series Clay – $50,000 – 32S/32Q/16D; Singles – Doubles	(Croatia) Nikola Mektić (Croatia) Antonio Veić; 6–3, 5–7, [10–7]	(Slovenia) Blaž Kavčič (Croatia) Franco Škugor	(Argentina) Agustín Velotti (Romania) Adrian Ungur	(Argentina) Máximo González (Croatia) Antonio Veić (Serbia) Boris Pašanski (Uruguay) Marcel Felder
October 29	Bauer Watertechnology Cup; Eckental, Germany; Regular series €30,000+H – Synthetic (indoor) – 32S/32Q/16D; Singles – Doubles	(Germany) Daniel Brands; 7–6^{(7–0)}, 6–3	(Latvia) Ernests Gulbis	(Germany) Dominik Meffert (Czech Republic) Jan Mertl	(Slovenia) Grega Žemlja (Germany) Nils Langer (Belgium) Ruben Bemelmans (United States) Rajeev Ram
October 29	Bauer Watertechnology Cup; Eckental, Germany; Regular series €30,000+H – Synthetic (indoor) – 32S/32Q/16D; Singles – Doubles	(United States) James Cerretani (Canada) Adil Shamasdin; 6–3, 2–6, [10–4]	(Poland) Tomasz Bednarek (Sweden) Andreas Siljeström	(Germany) Dominik Meffert (Czech Republic) Jan Mertl	(Slovenia) Grega Žemlja (Germany) Nils Langer (Belgium) Ruben Bemelmans (United States) Rajeev Ram

=== November ===
Week of	Tournament	Champions	Runners-up	Semifinalists	Quarterfinalists
November 5	Slovak Open; Bratislava, Slovakia; Tretorn SERIE+ Hard (indoor) – €85,000+H – 32S/32Q/16D; Singles – Doubles	(Czech Republic) Lukáš Rosol; 6–7^{(3–7)}, 7–6^{(7–5)}, 7–6^{(8–6)}	(Germany) Björn Phau	(Slovakia) Lukáš Lacko (Croatia) Ivan Dodig	(Belgium) Olivier Rochus (Slovakia) Ivo Klec (Romania) Marius Copil (Croatia) Ivo Karlović
November 5	Slovak Open; Bratislava, Slovakia; Tretorn SERIE+ Hard (indoor) – €85,000+H – 32S/32Q/16D; Singles – Doubles	(Czech Republic) Lukáš Dlouhý (Russia) Mikhail Elgin; 6–7^{(5–7)}, 6–2, [10–6]	(Germany) Philipp Marx (Romania) Florin Mergea	(Slovakia) Lukáš Lacko (Croatia) Ivan Dodig	(Belgium) Olivier Rochus (Slovakia) Ivo Klec (Romania) Marius Copil (Croatia) Ivo Karlović
November 5	Internazionali Tennis Val Gardena Südtirol; Urtijëi, Italy; Regular series Hard – €64,000 (indoor) – 32S/32Q/16D; Singles – Doubles	(Germany) Benjamin Becker; 6–1, 6–4	(Italy) Andreas Seppi	(France) Édouard Roger-Vasselin (Italy) Matteo Viola	(France) Pierre-Hugues Herbert (Italy) Simone Bolelli (Slovakia) Karol Beck (Belgium) Ruben Bemelmans
November 5	Internazionali Tennis Val Gardena Südtirol; Urtijëi, Italy; Regular series Hard – €64,000 (indoor) – 32S/32Q/16D; Singles – Doubles	(Slovakia) Karol Beck (South Africa) Rik de Voest; 6–3, 6–4	(Australia) Rameez Junaid (Germany) Michael Kohlmann	(France) Édouard Roger-Vasselin (Italy) Matteo Viola	(France) Pierre-Hugues Herbert (Italy) Simone Bolelli (Slovakia) Karol Beck (Belgium) Ruben Bemelmans
November 5	Challenger Ciudad de Guayaquil; Guayaquil, Ecuador; Regular series Clay – $50,000+H – 32S/32Q/16D; Singles – Doubles	(Argentina) Leonardo Mayer; 6–2, 6–4	(Italy) Paolo Lorenzi	(Argentina) Martín Alund (Spain) Rubén Ramírez Hidalgo	(Portugal) Pedro Sousa (Argentina) Guido Pella (Colombia) Juan Sebastián Cabal (Colombia) Alejandro González
November 5	Challenger Ciudad de Guayaquil; Guayaquil, Ecuador; Regular series Clay – $50,000+H – 32S/32Q/16D; Singles – Doubles	(Argentina) Martín Alund (Argentina) Facundo Bagnis; 7–5, 7–6^{(7–5)}	(Argentina) Leonardo Mayer (Argentina) Martín Ríos-Benítez	(Argentina) Martín Alund (Spain) Rubén Ramírez Hidalgo	(Portugal) Pedro Sousa (Argentina) Guido Pella (Colombia) Juan Sebastián Cabal (Colombia) Alejandro González
November 5	Knoxville Challenger; Knoxville, United States; Regular series Hard (indoor) – $50,000 – 32S/32Q/16D; Singles – Doubles	(United States) Michael Russell; 6–3, 6–2	(United States) Bobby Reynolds	(Australia) Samuel Groth (United States) Tim Smyczek	(United States) Tennys Sandgren (United States) Denis Kudla (United States) Rhyne Williams (United States) Alex Kuznetsov
November 5	Knoxville Challenger; Knoxville, United States; Regular series Hard (indoor) – $50,000 – 32S/32Q/16D; Singles – Doubles	(United States) Alex Kuznetsov (Germany) Mischa Zverev; 6–4, 6–2	(South Africa) Jean Andersen (South Africa) Izak van der Merwe	(Australia) Samuel Groth (United States) Tim Smyczek	(United States) Tennys Sandgren (United States) Denis Kudla (United States) Rhyne Williams (United States) Alex Kuznetsov
November 5	Aegon Pro-Series Loughborough; Loughborough, Great Britain; Regular series Hard – €42,500 (indoor) – 32S/32Q/16D; Singles – Doubles	(Russia) Evgeny Donskoy; 6–2, 4–6, 6–1	(Germany) Jan-Lennard Struff	(Germany) Tobias Kamke (France) Adrian Mannarino	(Belgium) Maxime Authom (Switzerland) Henri Laaksonen (Israel) Dudi Sela (United Kingdom) Jamie Baker
November 5	Aegon Pro-Series Loughborough; Loughborough, Great Britain; Regular series Hard – €42,500 (indoor) – 32S/32Q/16D; Singles – Doubles	(United States) James Cerretani (Canada) Adil Shamasdin; 6–4, 7–5	(India) Purav Raja (India) Divij Sharan	(Germany) Tobias Kamke (France) Adrian Mannarino	(Belgium) Maxime Authom (Switzerland) Henri Laaksonen (Israel) Dudi Sela (United Kingdom) Jamie Baker
November 5	São Léo Open; São Leopoldo, Brazil; Regular series Clay – $35,000+H – 32S/32Q/16D; Singles – Doubles	(Argentina) Horacio Zeballos; 3–6, 7–5, 7–6^{(7–2)}	(Chile) Paul Capdeville	(Argentina) Diego Schwartzman (Slovenia) Blaž Kavčič	(Bosnia and Herzegovina) Tomislav Brkić (Brazil) Rogério Dutra da Silva (Brazil) Fabiano de Paula (Portugal) Gastão Elias
November 5	São Léo Open; São Leopoldo, Brazil; Regular series Clay – $35,000+H – 32S/32Q/16D; Singles – Doubles	(Brazil) Fabiano de Paula (Brazil) Júlio Silva; 6–1, 7–6^{(7–5)}	(Uruguay) Ariel Behar (Argentina) Horacio Zeballos	(Argentina) Diego Schwartzman (Slovenia) Blaž Kavčič	(Bosnia and Herzegovina) Tomislav Brkić (Brazil) Rogério Dutra da Silva (Brazil) Fabiano de Paula (Portugal) Gastão Elias
November 12	IPP Open; Helsinki, Finland; Regular series Hard (indoor) – €106,500+H – 32S/32Q/16D; Singles – Doubles	(Slovakia) Lukáš Lacko; 6–3, 6–4	(Finland) Jarkko Nieminen	(Germany) Jan-Lennard Struff (Germany) Benjamin Becker	(Israel) Dudi Sela (Lithuania) Ričardas Berankis (Germany) Tim Pütz (Belarus) Dzmitry Zhyrmont
November 12	IPP Open; Helsinki, Finland; Regular series Hard (indoor) – €106,500+H – 32S/32Q/16D; Singles – Doubles	(Russia) Mikhail Elgin (Slovakia) Igor Zelenay; 4–6, 7–6^{(7–0)}, [10–4]	(Belarus) Uladzimir Ignatik (Chinese Taipei) Jimmy Wang	(Germany) Jan-Lennard Struff (Germany) Benjamin Becker	(Israel) Dudi Sela (Lithuania) Ričardas Berankis (Germany) Tim Pütz (Belarus) Dzmitry Zhyrmont
November 12	JSM Challenger of Champaign–Urbana; Champaign, United States; Regular series Hard (indoor) – $50,000 – 32S/32Q/16D; Singles – Doubles	(United States) Tim Smyczek; 2–6, 7–6^{(7–1)}, 7–5	(United States) Jack Sock	(United Kingdom) Alex Bogdanovic (United States) Rhyne Williams	(United States) Michael Russell (United States) Chase Buchanan (United States) Ryan Sweeting (Australia) John-Patrick Smith
November 12	JSM Challenger of Champaign–Urbana; Champaign, United States; Regular series Hard (indoor) – $50,000 – 32S/32Q/16D; Singles – Doubles	(United States) Devin Britton (United States) Austin Krajicek; 6–3, 6–3	(South Africa) Jean Andersen (South Africa) Izak van der Merwe	(United Kingdom) Alex Bogdanovic (United States) Rhyne Williams	(United States) Michael Russell (United States) Chase Buchanan (United States) Ryan Sweeting (Australia) John-Patrick Smith
November 12	Keio Challenger; Yokohama, Japan; Regular series Hard – $50,000 – 32S/32Q/16D; Singles – Doubles	(Italy) Matteo Viola; 7–6^{(7–3)}, 6–3	(Bosnia and Herzegovina) Mirza Bašić	(Japan) Taro Daniel (Japan) Yūichi Sugita	(Italy) Andrea Arnaboldi (Chinese Taipei) Huang Liang-chi (Japan) Hiroki Moriya (United States) Rajeev Ram
November 12	Keio Challenger; Yokohama, Japan; Regular series Hard – $50,000 – 32S/32Q/16D; Singles – Doubles	(India) Prakash Amritraj (Austria) Philipp Oswald; 6–3, 6–4	(Thailand) Sanchai Ratiwatana (Thailand) Sonchat Ratiwatana	(Japan) Taro Daniel (Japan) Yūichi Sugita	(Italy) Andrea Arnaboldi (Chinese Taipei) Huang Liang-chi (Japan) Hiroki Moriya (United States) Rajeev Ram
November 12	I Marbella Open; Marbella, Spain; Regular series Clay – €30,000+H – 32S/32Q/16D; Singles – Doubles	(Spain) Albert Montañés; 3–6, 6–2, 6–3	(Spain) Daniel Muñoz de la Nava	(Slovenia) Blaž Rola (Croatia) Antonio Veić	(Spain) Roberto Carballés Baena (Spain) Sergio Gutiérrez Ferrol (Spain) Rubén Ramírez Hidalgo (Russia) Andrey Kuznetsov
November 12	I Marbella Open; Marbella, Spain; Regular series Clay – €30,000+H – 32S/32Q/16D; Singles – Doubles	(Russia) Andrey Kuznetsov (Spain) Javier Martí; 6–3, 6–3	(Spain) Emilio Benfele Álvarez (Italy) Adelchi Virgili	(Slovenia) Blaž Rola (Croatia) Antonio Veić	(Spain) Roberto Carballés Baena (Spain) Sergio Gutiérrez Ferrol (Spain) Rubén Ramírez Hidalgo (Russia) Andrey Kuznetsov
November 19	Dunlop World Challenge; Toyota, Japan; Regular series €35,000+H – Synthetic (indoor) – 32S/32Q/16D; Singles – Doubles	(Poland) Michał Przysiężny; 6–2, 6–3	(Japan) Hiroki Moriya	(Japan) Yūichi Sugita (Australia) John Millman	(Japan) Hiroki Kondo (Chinese Taipei) Jimmy Wang (Italy) Matteo Viola (Bosnia and Herzegovina) Mirza Bašić
November 19	Dunlop World Challenge; Toyota, Japan; Regular series €35,000+H – Synthetic (indoor) – 32S/32Q/16D; Singles – Doubles	(Austria) Philipp Oswald (Croatia) Mate Pavić; 6–3, 3–6, [10–2]	(Italy) Andrea Arnaboldi (Italy) Matteo Viola	(Japan) Yūichi Sugita (Australia) John Millman	(Japan) Hiroki Kondo (Chinese Taipei) Jimmy Wang (Italy) Matteo Viola (Bosnia and Herzegovina) Mirza Bašić
November 19	Siberia Cup; Tyumen, Russia; Regular series Hard (indoor) – $35,000+H – 32S/32Q/16D; Singles – Doubles	(Russia) Evgeny Donskoy; 6–7^{(6–8)}, 6–3, 6–2	(Ukraine) Illya Marchenko	(Ukraine) Ivan Sergeyev (Russia) Igor Kunitsyn	(Kazakhstan) Evgeny Korolev (Ukraine) Denys Molchanov (Russia) Valery Rudnev (France) Josselin Ouanna
November 19	Siberia Cup; Tyumen, Russia; Regular series Hard (indoor) – $35,000+H – 32S/32Q/16D; Singles – Doubles	(Slovakia) Ivo Klec (Sweden) Andreas Siljeström; 6–3, 6–2	(Russia) Konstantin Kravchuk (Ukraine) Denys Molchanov	(Ukraine) Ivan Sergeyev (Russia) Igor Kunitsyn	(Kazakhstan) Evgeny Korolev (Ukraine) Denys Molchanov (Russia) Valery Rudnev (France) Josselin Ouanna
November 26	ATP Challenger Tour Finals; São Paulo, Brazil; Regular series Hard (indoor) – €220,000+H – 8S; Singles	(Argentina) Guido Pella; 6–3, 6–7^{(4–7)}, 7–6^{(7–4)}	(Romania) Adrian Ungur	(Slovenia) Aljaž Bedene (Romania) Victor Hănescu	Round Robin losers (Brazil) Thomaz Bellucci (withdrew) (Portugal) Gastão Elias (Brazil) Thiago Alves (Italy) Paolo Lorenzi (Spain) Rubén Ramírez Hidalgo

== Statistical Information ==
These tables present the number of singles (S) and doubles (D) titles won by each player and each nation during the season, within all the tournament categories of the 2012 ATP Challenger Tour: the Tretorn SERIE+ tournaments, and the regular series tournaments. The players/nations are sorted by: 1) total number of titles (a doubles title won by two players representing the same nation counts as only one win for the nation); 2) cumulated importance of those titles (one Tretorn SERIE+ win > one regular tournament win); 3) a singles > doubles hierarchy; 4) alphabetical order (by family names for players).

To avoid confusion and double counting, these tables should be updated only after an event is completed.

=== Titles won by player ===
Total	Player	Tretorn SERIE+		Regular series		Total	
Total	Player	S	D	S	D	S	D
8	Horacio Zeballos (ARG)			● ● ●	● ● ● ● ●	3	5
8	Sanchai Ratiwatana (THA)				● ● ● ● ● ● ● ●	0	8
8	Sonchat Ratiwatana (THA)				● ● ● ● ● ● ● ●	0	8
7	John Peers (AUS)				● ● ● ● ● ● ●	0	7
6	Martin Kližan (SVK)	●		● ● ●	● ●	4	2
6	Andrey Kuznetsov (RUS)			● ● ● ●	● ●	4	2
6	John-Patrick Smith (AUS)			●	● ● ● ● ●	1	5
5	Jerzy Janowicz (POL)	● ●	●	●	●	3	2
5	Evgeny Donskoy (RUS)	●		● ● ● ●		5	0
5	Guido Pella (ARG)			● ● ● ●	●	4	1
5	João Souza (BRA)			● ●	● ● ●	2	3
5	Antonio Veić (CRO)			●	● ● ● ●	1	4
5	Lukáš Dlouhý (CZE)				● ● ● ● ●	0	5
5	Martín Alund (ARG)				● ● ● ● ●	0	5
5	Laurynas Grigelis (LTU)				● ● ● ● ●	0	5
5	Simon Stadler (GER)		●		● ● ● ●	0	5
4	Aljaž Bedene (SVN)			● ● ● ●		4	0
4	Konstantin Kravchuk (RUS)		●		● ● ●	0	4
4	Denys Molchanov (UKR)		●		● ● ●	0	4
4	Daniel Gimeno Traver (ESP)			● ● ●	●	3	1
4	Uladzimir Ignatik (BLR)			●	● ● ●	1	3
4	Tomasz Bednarek (POL)				● ● ● ●	0	4
4	Andre Begemann (GER)				● ● ● ●	0	4
4	Marcelo Demoliner (BRA)				● ● ● ●	0	4
4	Florin Mergea (ROU)		●		● ● ●	0	4
4	Johan Brunström (SWE)				● ● ● ●	0	4
4	Martin Emmrich (GER)				● ● ● ●	0	4
4	Marcel Felder (URU)				● ● ● ●	0	4
4	Raven Klaasen (RSA)				● ● ● ●	0	4
4	Nicholas Monroe (USA)				● ● ● ●	0	4
4	Philipp Oswald (AUT)				● ● ● ●	0	4
3	Roberto Bautista-Agut (ESP)	●		● ●		3	0
3	Rameez Junaid (AUS)		●		● ●	0	3
3	Thiemo de Bakker (NED)			● ● ●		3	0
3	Victor Hănescu (ROU)			● ● ●		3	0
3	Igor Sijsling (NED)			● ● ●		3	0
3	Go Soeda (JPN)			● ● ●		3	0
3	Grega Žemlja (SVN)			● ● ●		3	0
3	Yen-hsun Lu (TPE)			● ● ●		3	0
3	Blaž Kavčič (SVN)			● ●	●	2	1
3	Vasek Pospisil (CAN)			● ●	●	2	1
3	João Sousa (POR)			● ●	●	2	1
3	Facundo Bagnis (ARG)			●	● ●	1	2
3	Dustin Brown (GER)			●	● ●	1	2
3	Paul Capdeville (CHI)			●	● ●	1	2
3	James Cerretani (USA)				● ● ●	0	3
3	Rik de Voest (RSA)				● ● ●	0	3
3	Marin Draganja (CRO)				● ● ●	0	3
3	Martin Fischer (AUT)				● ● ●	0	3
3	Hsin-han Lee (TPE)				● ● ●	0	3
3	Mateusz Kowalczyk (POL)				● ● ●	0	3
3	Dane Propoggia (AUS)				● ● ●	0	3
3	Adil Shamasdin (CAN)				● ● ●	0	3
2	Rubén Ramírez Hidalgo (ESP)	●		●		2	0
2	Paolo Lorenzi (ITA)	●		●		2	0
2	Jürgen Zopp (EST)		●	●		1	1
2	Thiago Alves (BRA)			● ●		2	0
2	Benjamin Becker (GER)			● ●		2	0
2	Simone Bolelli (ITA)			● ●		2	0
2	Kenny de Schepper (FRA)			● ●		2	0
2	Alejandro Falla (COL)			● ●		2	0
2	David Goffin (BEL)			● ●		2	0
2	Andreas Haider-Maurer (AUT)			● ●		2	0
2	Tatsuma Ito (JPN)			● ●		2	0
2	Denis Kudla (USA)			● ●		2	0
2	Marinko Matosevic (AUS)			● ●		2	0
2	Albert Montañés (ESP)			● ●		2	0
2	Josselin Ouanna (FRA)			● ●		2	0
2	Björn Phau (GER)			● ●		2	0
2	Tommy Robredo (ESP)			● ●		2	0
2	Tim Smyczek (USA)			● ●		2	0
2	Dmitry Tursunov (RUS)			● ●		2	0
2	Guido Andreozzi (ARG)			●	●	1	1
2	Yuki Bhambri (IND)			●	●	1	1
2	Lukáš Rosol (CZE)			●	●	1	1
2	Carlos Salamanca (COL)			●	●	1	1
2	Dudi Sela (ISR)			●	●	1	1
2	Denis Zivkovic (USA)			●	●	1	1
2	Michal Mertiňák (SVK)		● ●			0	2
2	Stefano Ianni (ITA)		●		●	0	2
2	Radu Albot (MDA)				● ●	0	2
2	Karol Beck (SVK)				● ●	0	2
2	Devin Britton (USA)				● ●	0	2
2	Juan Sebastián Cabal (COL)				● ●	0	2
2	Olivier Charroin (FRA)				● ●	0	2
2	Nikola Ćirić (SRB)				● ●	0	2
2	Jamie Delgado (GBR)				● ●	0	2
2	Michail Elgin (RUS)				● ●	0	2
2	John Paul Fruttero (USA)				● ●	0	2
2	Pierre-Hugues Herbert (FRA)				● ●	0	2
2	Dominic Inglot (GBR)				● ●	0	2
2	Brydan Klein (AUS)				● ●	0	2
2	Austin Krajicek (USA)				● ●	0	2
2	Jonathan Marray (GBR)				● ●	0	2
2	Philipp Marx (GER)				● ●	0	2
2	Nikola Mektić (CRO)				● ●	0	2
2	Dick Norman (BEL)				● ●	0	2
2	Hsien-yin Peng (TPE)				● ●	0	2
2	Divij Sharan (IND)				● ●	0	2
2	Andreas Siljeström (SWE)				● ●	0	2
2	Júlio Silva (BRA)				● ●	0	2
2	Ken Skupski (GBR)				● ●	0	2
2	Goran Tošić (MNE)				● ●	0	2
2	Marco Trungelliti (ARG)				● ●	0	2
2	Izak van der Merwe (RSA)				● ●	0	2
2	Igor Zelenay (SVK)				● ●	0	2
2	Lovro Zovko (CRO)				● ●	0	2
1	Brian Baker (USA)			●		1	0
1	Thomaz Bellucci (BRA)			●		1	0
1	James Blake (USA)			●		1	0
1	Daniel Brands (GER)			●		1	0
1	Grégoire Burquier (FRA)			●		1	0
1	Jérémy Chardy (FRA)			●		1	0
1	Guilherme Clezar (BRA)			●		1	0
1	Frank Dancevic (CAN)			●		1	0
1	Jonathan Dasnières de Veigy (FRA)			●		1	0
1	Rogério Dutra da Silva (BRA)			●		1	0
1	Gastão Elias (POR)			●		1	0
1	Marc Gicquel (FRA)			●		1	0
1	Peter Gojowczyk (GER)			●		1	0
1	Simon Greul (GER)			●		1	0
1	Jan Hájek (CZE)			●		1	0
1	Jan Hernych (CZE)			●		1	0
1	Ricardo Hocevar (BRA)			●		1	0
1	Steve Johnson (USA)			●		1	0
1	Tobias Kamke (GER)			●		1	0
1	Igor Kunitsyn (RUS)			●		1	0
1	Lukáš Lacko (SVK)			●		1	0
1	Dušan Lajović (SRB)			●		1	0
1	Jesse Levine (USA)			●		1	0
1	Illya Marchenko (UKR)			●		1	0
1	Florian Mayer (GER)			●		1	0
1	Leonardo Mayer (ARG)			●		1	0
1	Dominik Meffert (GER)			●		1	0
1	Ivo Minář (CZE)			●		1	0
1	Gianluca Naso (ITA)			●		1	0
1	Wayne Odesnik (USA)			●		1	0
1	Michał Przysiężny (POL)			●		1	0
1	Sam Querrey (USA)			●		1	0
1	Michael Russell (USA)			●		0	1
1	Diego Schwartzman (ARG)			●		1	0
1	Jack Sock (USA)			●		1	0
1	Danai Udomchoke (THA)			●		1	0
1	Adrian Ungur (ROU)			●		1	0
1	Matteo Viola (ITA)			●		1	0
1	Michael Yani (USA)			●		1	0
1	Antal van der Duim (NED)		●			0	1
1	Boy Westerhof (NED)		●			0	1
1	Prakash Amritraj (IND)				●	0	1
1	Facundo Argüello (ARG)				●	0	1
1	Maxime Authom (BEL)				●	0	1
1	Carsten Ball (AUS)				●	0	1
1	Ariel Behar (URU)				●	0	1
1	Ruben Bemelmans (BEL)				●	0	1
1	Duilio Beretta (PER)				●	0	1
1	Philip Bester (CAN)				●	0	1
1	Arnau Brugués Davi (ESP)				●	0	1
1	Júlio César Campozano (ECU)				●	0	1
1	Kamil Čapkovič (SVK)				●	0	1
1	Marius Copil (ROU)				●	0	1
1	Victor Crivoi (ROU)				●	0	1
1	Jeff Dadamo (USA)				●	0	1
1	Andrei Dăescu (ROU)				●	0	1
1	Fabiano de Paula (BRA)				●	0	1
1	Federico Delbonis (ARG)				●	0	1
1	Amer Delić (BIH)				●	0	1
1	Chris Eaton (GBR)				●	0	1
1	Víctor Estrella (DOM)				●	0	1
1	Robert Farah (COL)				●	0	1
1	Teymuraz Gabashvili (RUS)				●	0	1
1	André Ghem (BRA)				●	0	1
1	Andrey Golubev (KAZ)				●	0	1
1	Alejandro González (COL)				●	0	1
1	Santiago González (MEX)				●	0	1
1	Chris Guccione (AUS)				●	0	1
1	Cheng-peng Hsieh (TPE)				●	0	1
1	Íñigo Cervantes Huegun (ESP)				●	0	1
1	Treat Conrad Huey (PHI)				●	0	1
1	Diego Junqueira (ARG)				●	0	1
1	Christopher Kas (GER)				●	0	1
1	Jordan Kerr (AUS)				●	0	1
1	Ivo Klec (SVK)				●	0	1
1	Michael Linzer (AUT)				●	0	1
1	Scott Lipsky (USA)				●	0	1
1	Dino Marcan (CRO)				●	0	1
1	Javier Martí (ESP)				●	0	1
1	Gerald Melzer (AUT)				●	0	1
1	Adrián Menéndez (ESP)				●	0	1
1	Andrés Molteni (ARG)				●	0	1
1	Nikolaus Moser (AUT)				●	0	1
1	Alessandro Motti (ITA)				●	0	1
1	Daniel Muñoz de la Nava (ESP)				●	0	1
1	Gilles Müller (LUX)				●	0	1
1	Iván Navarro (ESP)				●	0	1
1	Oleksandr Nedovyesov (UKR)				●	0	1
1	Frederik Nielsen (DEN)				●	0	1
1	Albano Olivetti (FRA)				●	0	1
1	Renzo Olivo (ARG)				●	0	1
1	Boris Pašanski (SRB)				●	0	1
1	Mate Pavić (CRO)				●	0	1
1	Jaroslav Pospíšil (CZE)				●	0	1
1	Travis Rettenmaier (USA)				●	0	1
1	Bobby Reynolds (USA)				●	0	1
1	David Rice (GBR)				●	0	1
1	Fernando Romboli (BRA)				●	0	1
1	Guillaume Rufin (FRA)			●		1	0
1	Tennys Sandgren (USA)				●	0	1
1	Yuri Schukin (KAZ)				●	0	1
1	Ivan Sergeyev (UKR)				●	0	1
1	David Škoch (CZE)				●	0	1
1	Harel Srugo (ISR)				●	0	1
1	Maciek Sykut (USA)				●	0	1
1	Maxime Teixeira (FRA)				●	0	1
1	Sean Thornley (GBR)				●	0	1
1	Walter Trusendi (ITA)				●	0	1
1	Vishnu Vardhan (IND)				●	0	1
1	Agustín Velotti (ARG)				●	0	1
1	Matteo Viola (ITA)				●	0	1
1	Amir Weintraub (ISR)				●	0	1
1	Rhyne Williams (USA)				●	0	1
1	Mischa Zverev (GER)				●	0	1

=== Titles won by nation ===
Total	Nation	Tretorn SERIE+		Regular series		Total	
Total	Nation	S	D	S	D	S	D
32	United States (USA)			14	18	14	18
26	Germany (GER)		1	11	14	11	15
25	Argentina (ARG)			11	14	11	14
20	Russia (RUS)	1	1	11	7	12	8
19	Australia (AUS)		1	3	15	3	16
18	Spain (ESP)	2		10	6	12	6
14	Slovakia (SVK)	1	2	4	7	5	9
14	Brazil (BRA)			7	7	7	7
13	France (FRA)			9	4	9	4
12	Czech Republic (CZE)		2	4	6	4	8
11	Italy (ITA)	1	1	5	4	6	5
10	Slovenia (SVN)			9	1	9	1
9	Poland (POL)	2	1	1	5	3	6
9	Romania (ROU)		1	4	4	4	5
9	Austria (AUT)			2	7	2	7
9	Croatia (CRO)			1	8	1	8
9	Thailand (THA)			1	8	1	8
8	South Africa (RSA)			0	8	0	8
7	Netherlands (NED)		1	6	0	6	1
7	Canada (CAN)			3	4	3	4
7	Great Britain (GBR)			0	7	0	7
6	Ukraine (UKR)		1	1	4	1	5
6	Chinese Taipei (TPE)			3	3	3	3
6	Colombia (COL)			3	3	3	3
6	Sweden (SWE)			0	6	0	6
5	Japan (JPN)			5	0	5	0
5	Belgium (BEL)			2	3	2	3
5	Lithuania (LTU)			0	5	0	5
5	Uruguay (URU)			0	5	0	5
4	Portugal (POR)			3	1	3	1
4	Belarus (BLR)			1	3	1	3
4	India (IND)			1	3	1	3
3	Chile (CHI)			1	2	1	2
3	Israel (ISR)			1	2	1	2
3	Serbia (SRB)			1	2	1	2
2	Estonia (EST)		1	1	0	1	1
2	Montenegro (MNE)			0	2	0	2
2	Moldova (MDA)			0	2	0	2
1	Poland (POL)			1	0	1	01
1	Bosnia and Herzegovina (BIH)			0	1	0	1
1	Denmark (DEN)			0	1	0	1
1	Dominican Republic (DOM)			0	1	0	1
1	Ecuador (ECU)			0	1	0	1
1	Kazakhstan (KAZ)			0	1	0	1
1	Luxembourg (LUX)			0	1	0	1
1	Mexico (MEX)			0	1	0	1
1	Peru (PER)			0	1	0	1
1	Philippines (PHI)			0	1	0	1

== ATP Year-To-Date Challenger Rankings ==
2012 YTD Challenger Rankings (ranking was closed as of 5 November 2012)
#	Player	Points	Events
1	Victor Hănescu (ROU)	562	11
2	Paolo Lorenzi (ITA)	510	13
3	Martin Kližan (SVK)	483	12
4	Aljaž Bedene (SVN)	471	15
5	Andrey Kuznetsov (RUS)	459	16
6	Jerzy Janowicz (POL)	450	14
7	Evgeny Donskoy (RUS)	445	20
8	Tatsuma Ito (JPN)	438	11
9	Guido Pella (ARG)	426	18
10	Daniel Gimeno Traver (ESP)	423	14
11	Andreas Haider-Maurer (AUT)	421	20
12	Roberto Bautista Agut (ESP)	416	11
13	Grega Žemlja (SVN)	399	15
14	Rubén Ramírez Hidalgo (ESP)	393	15
15	Gastão Elias (POR)	392	24
16	João Sousa (POR)	391	23
17	Go Soeda (JPN)	385	12
18	Igor Sijsling (NED)	385	12
19	Simone Bolelli (ITA)	385	15
20	Adrian Ungur (ROU)	382	16

== Point Distribution ==
Points are awarded as follows:

Tournament Category	W	F	SF	QF	R16	R32	Q
Challenger $125,000+H; Challenger €106,500+H	125	75	45	25	10	0	+5
Challenger $125,000; Challenger €106,500	110	65	40	20	9	0	+5
Challenger $100,000; Challenger €85,000	100	60	35	18	8	0	+5
Challenger $75,000; Challenger €64,000	90	55	33	17	8	0	+5
Challenger $50,000; Challenger €42,500	80	48	29	15	7	0	+3
Challenger $35,000+H; Challenger €30,000+H	80	48	29	15	6	0	+3

== See also ==
- Association of Tennis Professionals
- International Tennis Federation
