= 2009 Mitsubishi Electric Europe Cup – Doubles =

Doubles
- 2009 Mitsubishi Electric Europe Cup

Final
- Champions: (United Kingdom) James Auckland (United States) Travis Rettenmaier
- Runners-up: (Czech Republic) Dušan Karol (Czech Republic) Jaroslav Pospíšil
- Score: 7–5, 6–7(6), [10–4]

Events
Singles	Doubles
← 2008 ·	Mitsubishi Electric Europe Cup	· 2010 →

Stefano Galvani and Alberto Martín were the defenders of title, but they chose to not participate this year.
James Auckland and Travis Rettenmaier won in the final 7–5, 6–7(6), [10–4], against Dušan Karol and Jaroslav Pospíšil.

== Seeds ==
1. (France) Olivier Charroin / (France) Nicolas Tourte (first round)
2. (Czech Republic) Dušan Karol / (Czech Republic) Jaroslav Pospíšil (final)
3. (United Kingdom) James Auckland / (United States) Travis Rettenmaier (champions)
4. (Italy) Fabio Colangelo / (Brazil) Márcio Torres (first round)

== Draw ==
=== Key ===
- Q = Qualifier
- WC = Wild card
- LL = Lucky loser
- Alt = Alternate
- SE = Special exempt
- PR = Protected ranking
- ITF = ITF entry
- JE = Junior exempt
- w/o = Walkover
- r = Retired
- d = Defaulted
- SR = Special ranking

=== Draw ===
First round
1	(France) O Charroin (France) N Tourte	6	3	[5]
(Italy) D Giorgini (Italy) F Volandri	1	6	[10]
(Brazil) R Dutra da Silva (Brazil) D Silva	6	6
(Germany) S Greul (Germany) T Kamke	3	3
3	(United Kingdom) J Auckland (United States) T Rettenmaier	6	6
WC	(Italy) A Arnaboldi (Italy) M Dell'Acqua	3	4
(Italy) A Da Col (Italy) A Stoppini	1	6	[10]
(Argentina) JP Brzezicki (Peru) I Miranda	6	3	[5]
WC	(Italy) A Brizzi (Brazil) V Trevisan	5	1
(Italy) A di Mauro (Italy) T Fabbiano	7	6
(Netherlands) T de Bakker (Netherlands) I Sijsling	7	4	[11]
4	(Italy) F Colangelo (Brazil) M Torres	5	6	[9]
(Ukraine) I Marchenko (Denmark) K Pless	3	5
(Argentina) S Decoud (Italy) T Tenconi	6	7
WC	(Italy) M Baio (Italy) S Ianni	4	6	[8]
2	(Czech Republic) D Karol (Czech Republic) J Pospíšil	6	3	[10]

Quarterfinals
(Italy) D Giorgini (Italy) F Volandri	6	6
(Brazil) R Dutra da Silva (Brazil) D Silva	4	2
3	(United Kingdom) J Auckland (United States) T Rettenmaier	6	6
(Italy) A Da Col (Italy) A Stoppini	3	4
(Italy) A di Mauro (Italy) T Fabbiano	6	6
(Netherlands) T de Bakker (Netherlands) I Sijsling	3	4
(Argentina) S Decoud (Italy) T Tenconi	3	7	[5]
2	(Czech Republic) D Karol (Czech Republic) J Pospíšil	6	5	[10]

Semifinals
(Italy) D Giorgini (Italy) F Volandri	2	7	[9]
3	(United Kingdom) J Auckland (United States) T Rettenmaier	6	6^{4}	[11]
(Italy) A di Mauro (Italy) T Fabbiano	1	2
2	(Czech Republic) D Karol (Czech Republic) J Pospíšil	6	6

Finals
3	(United Kingdom) J Auckland (United States) T Rettenmaier	7	6^{6}	[10]
2	(Czech Republic) D Karol (Czech Republic) J Pospíšil	5	7	[4]
