= 2010 Mitsubishi Electric Cup =

- Date: April 5 – April 11
- Edition: 6th
- Location: Monza, Italy

Champions

Singles
- (Germany) Daniel Brands

Doubles
- (Italy) Daniele Bracciali / (Spain) David Marrero
← 2009 ·	Mitsubishi Electric Cup	· 2011 →

The 2010 Mitsubishi Electric Cup was a professional tennis tournament played on indoor red clay courts. It was part of the 2010 ATP Challenger Tour. It took place in Monza, Italy between 5 and 11 April 2010.

== ATP entrants ==
=== Seeds ===
Nationality	Player	Ranking*	Seeding
GER	Daniel Brands	94	1
RUS	Igor Kunitsyn	100	2
ESP	Pere Riba	117	3
ROU	Victor Crivoi	118	4
JAM	Dustin Brown	124	5
SRB	Ilija Bozoljac	129	6
POL	Michał Przysiężny	130	7
BEL	Christophe Rochus	136	8

- Rankings are as of March 22, 2010.

=== Other entrants ===
The following players received wildcards into the singles main draw:

- (Italy) Andrea Arnaboldi
- (Italy) Stefano Ianni
- (Serbia) Dejan Katić
- (Italy) Matteo Trevisan

The following players received entry from the qualifying draw:

- (Austria) Johannes Ager
- (Italy) Francesco Aldi
- (Monaco) Benjamin Balleret
- (Netherlands) Jesse Huta Galung

The following player received the lucky loser spot:

- (Brazil) Marcelo Demoliner

== Champions ==
=== Singles ===
(Germany) Daniel Brands def. (Spain) Pablo Andújar, 6–7(4), 6–3, 6–4

=== Doubles ===
(Italy) Daniele Bracciali / (Spain) David Marrero def. (Austria) Martin Fischer / (Denmark) Frederik Nielsen, 6–3, 6–3
