= 2010 Mitsubishi Electric Cup – Singles =

Singles
- 2010 Mitsubishi Electric Cup

Final
- Champion: (Germany) Daniel Brands
- Runner-up: (Spain) Pablo Andújar
- Score: 6–7(4), 6–3, 6–4

Events
Singles	Doubles
← 2009 ·	Mitsubishi Electric Cup	· 2011 →

David Marrero was the defender of championship title, but lost to Christophe Rochus in the second round.
Daniel Brands won in the final 6–7(4), 6–3, 6–4, against Pablo Andújar.

== Seeds ==
1. (Germany) Daniel Brands (champion)
2. (Russia) Igor Kunitsyn (first round)
3. (Spain) Pere Riba (semifinals)
4. (Romania) Victor Crivoi (quarterfinals, retired)
5. (Jamaica) Dustin Brown (first round)
6. (Serbia) Ilija Bozoljac (first round)
7. (Poland) Michał Przysiężny (first round, retired)
8. (Belgium) Christophe Rochus (semifinals)

== Draw ==
=== Key ===
- Q = Qualifier
- WC = Wild card
- LL = Lucky loser
- Alt = Alternate
- SE = Special exempt
- PR = Protected ranking
- ITF = ITF entry
- JE = Junior exempt
- w/o = Walkover
- r = Retired
- d = Defaulted
- SR = Special ranking

=== Finals ===
Semifinals
1	(Germany) Daniel Brands	6	6
8	(Belgium) Christophe Rochus	3	4
3	(Spain) Pere Riba	4	6	2
(Spain) Pablo Andújar	6	3	6

Final
1	(Germany) Daniel Brands	6^{4}	6	6
(Spain) Pablo Andújar	7	3	4

=== Top half ===
First round
1	(Germany) D Brands	6	6^{2}	7
(Belgium) N Desein	2	7	6^{6}
(Spain) A Ramos Viñolas	6^{2}	6	4
(France) V Millot	7	3	6
(Croatia) R Karanušić	2	r
(Switzerland) M Lammer	5
WC	(Italy) M Trevisan	7	6
6	(Serbia) I Bozoljac	6^{2}	3
4	(Romania) V Crivoi	6	7
(Chile) A García	4	5
LL	(Brazil) M Demoliner	1	1
WC	(Serbia) D Katić	6	6
(Austria) M Fischer	4	4
(Spain) D Marrero	6	6
WC	(Italy) S Ianni	0	6	4
8	(Belgium) C Rochus	6	2	6

Second round
1	(Germany) D Brands	6	6
(France) V Millot	2	3
(Switzerland) M Lammer	2	3
WC	(Italy) M Trevisan	6	6
4	(Romania) V Crivoi	7	6
WC	(Serbia) D Katić	6^{5}	3
(Spain) D Marrero	2	3
8	(Belgium) C Rochus	6	6

Quarterfinals
1	(Germany) D Brands	6	6
WC	(Italy) M Trevisan	2	3
4	(Romania) V Crivoi	3	r
8	(Belgium) C Rochus	1

Semifinals
1	(Germany) D Brands	6	6
8	(Belgium) C Rochus	3	4

=== Bottom half ===
First round
7	(Poland) M Przysiężny	2	0	r
WC	(Italy) A Arnaboldi	6	1
(Czech Republic) D Lojda	6^{1}	5
(Argentina) M Vassallo Argüello	7	7
(Italy) F Volandri	1	6	6
Q	(Netherlands) J Huta Galung	6	3	4
(Spain) D Muñoz de la Nava	7	4	6^{3}
3	(Spain) P Riba	5	6	7
6	(Jamaica) D Brown	6^{4}	3
(Spain) P Andújar	7	6
(Ukraine) S Bubka	4	2
(Chile) J Aguilar	6	6
Q	(Italy) F Aldi	6	6
(United States) J Witten	2	3
Q	(Monaco) B Balleret	6	4	6
2	(Russia) I Kunitsyn	4	6	4

Second round
WC	(Italy) A Arnaboldi	1	4
(Argentina) M Vassallo Argüello	6	6
(Italy) F Volandri	6	3	2
3	(Spain) P Riba	4	6	6
(Spain) P Andújar	7	7
(Chile) J Aguilar	5	5
Q	(Italy) F Aldi	6	6
Q	(Monaco) B Balleret	2	2

Quarterfinals
(Argentina) M Vassallo Argüello	6	2	3
3	(Spain) P Riba	4	6	6
(Spain) P Andújar	7	6
Q	(Italy) F Aldi	6^{3}	4

Semifinals
3	(Spain) P Riba	4	6	2
(Spain) P Andújar	6	3	6
