= 2010 Mitsubishi Electric Cup – Doubles =

Doubles
- 2010 Mitsubishi Electric Cup

Final
- Champions: (Italy) Daniele Bracciali (Spain) David Marrero
- Runners-up: (Austria) Martin Fischer (Denmark) Frederik Nielsen
- Score: 6–3, 6–3

Events
Singles	Doubles
← 2009 ·	Mitsubishi Electric Cup	· 2011 →

James Auckland and Travis Rettenmaier were the defending champions but they chose not to compete.
Daniele Bracciali and David Marrero beat Martin Fischer and Frederik Nielsen in the final (6–3, 6–3).

== Seeds ==
1. (Italy) Daniele Bracciali / (Spain) David Marrero (champions)
2. (Austria) Martin Fischer / (Denmark) Frederik Nielsen (final)
3. (Netherlands) Jesse Huta Galung / (Netherlands) Rogier Wassen (first round)
4. (United States) Brian Battistone / (Philippines) Treat Conrad Huey (semifinals)

== Draw ==
=== Key ===
- Q = Qualifier
- WC = Wild card
- LL = Lucky loser
- Alt = Alternate
- SE = Special exempt
- PR = Protected ranking
- ITF = ITF entry
- JE = Junior exempt
- w/o = Walkover
- r = Retired
- d = Defaulted
- SR = Special ranking

=== Draw ===
First round
1	(Italy) D Bracciali (Spain) D Marrero	6	6
(Croatia) R Karanušić (Czech Republic) D Lojda	0	2
(Italy) C Grassi (Italy) M Marrai	6^{5}	2
WC	(Jamaica) D Brown (Italy) F Colangelo	7	6
4	(United States) B Battistone (Philippines) TC Huey	6	6
WC	(France) Y Dupuy (Serbia) D Katić	1	3
(Switzerland) M Lammer (United States) J Witten	6	6
(Brazil) M Demoliner (Argentina) A Fabbri	4	2
(Italy) F Aldi (Italy) W Trusendi	7	7
(Spain) P Clar-Rosselló (Spain) A Ramos-Viñolas	5	5
(Chile) J Aguilar (Spain) P Riba	7	6
3	(Netherlands) J Huta Galung (Netherlands) R Wassen	5	3
WC	(Italy) M Baio (Italy) S Ianni	2	3
(Spain) P Andújar (Spain) D Muñoz-De La Nava	6	6
(Belgium) N Desein (Belgium) C Rochus	3	4
2	(Austria) M Fischer (Denmark) F Nielsen	6	6

Quarterfinals
1	(Italy) D Bracciali (Spain) D Marrero	6	7
WC	(Jamaica) D Brown (Italy) F Colangelo	4	6^{3}
4	(United States) B Battistone (Philippines) TC Huey	2	6	[10]
(Switzerland) M Lammer (United States) J Witten	6	3	[8]
(Italy) F Aldi (Italy) W Trusendi	6	4	[10]
(Chile) J Aguilar (Spain) P Riba	0	6	[3]
(Spain) P Andújar (Spain) D Muñoz-De la Nava	w/o
2	(Austria) M Fischer (Denmark) F Nielsen

Semifinals
1	(Italy) D Bracciali (Spain) D Marrero	6	6
4	(United States) B Battistone (Philippines) TC Huey	4	4
(Italy) F Aldi (Italy) W Trusendi	3	7	[11]
2	(Austria) M Fischer (Denmark) F Nielsen	6	5	[13]

Finals
1	(Italy) D Bracciali (Spain) D Marrero	6	6
2	(Austria) M Fischer (Denmark) F Nielsen	3	3
