= 2009 Mitsubishi Electric Europe Cup – Singles =

Singles
- 2009 Mitsubishi Electric Europe Cup

Final
- Champion: (Spain) David Marrero
- Runner-up: (Croatia) Antonio Veić
- Score: 5–7, 6–4, 6–4

Events
Singles	Doubles
← 2008 ·	Mitsubishi Electric Europe Cup	· 2010 →

Albert Montañés was the defending champion, but he chose to not defend his 2008 title.
The next champion became other Spaniard player, David Marrero, who won in the final 5–7, 6–4, 6–4, against Antonio Veić.

== Seeds ==
1. (Germany) Simon Greul (second round)
2. (France) Adrian Mannarino (quarterfinals)
3. (France) Mathieu Montcourt (second round)
4. (Italy) Filippo Volandri (second round)
5. (Italy) Tomas Tenconi (first round)
6. (Argentina) Sebastián Decoud (first round)
7. (Slovenia) Grega Žemlja (first round)
8. (Denmark) Kristian Pless (first round)

== Draw ==
=== Key ===
- Q = Qualifier
- WC = Wild card
- LL = Lucky loser
- Alt = Alternate
- SE = Special exempt
- PR = Protected ranking
- ITF = ITF entry
- JE = Junior exempt
- w/o = Walkover
- r = Retired
- d = Defaulted
- SR = Special ranking

=== Final four ===
Semifinals
(Croatia) Antonio Veić	7	7
(Italy) Alessio di Mauro	5	5
(Spain) David Marrero	7	6
(Monaco) Jean-René Lisnard	6^{5}	3

Final
(Croatia) Antonio Veić	7	4	4
(Spain) David Marrero	5	6	6

=== Top half ===
First round
1	(Germany) S Greul	5	6	6
WC	(Italy) A Arnaboldi	7	3	3
(Germany) A Flock	6	6
WC	(Italy) S Ianni	4	2
(Serbia) D Katić	2	3
(Croatia) A Veić	6	6
(Argentina) JP Brzezicki	6	6
7	(Slovenia) G Žemlja	1	2
3	(France) M Montcourt	6	7
Q	(Brazil) D Silva	4	6^{8}
(Germany) T Kamke	4	3
(Italy) A di Mauro	6	6
LL	(Spain) I Cervantes Huegun	2	6^{5}
(Germany) J Reister	6	7
Q	(Czech Republic) R Vik	4	6	7
8	(Denmark) K Pless	6	4	6^{2}

Second round
1	(Germany) S Greul	4	2
(Germany) A Flock	6	6
(Croatia) A Veić	6	3	6
(Argentina) JP Brzezicki	3	6	4
3	(France) M Montcourt	5	4
(Italy) A di Mauro	7	6
(Germany) J Reister	6	6
Q	(Czech Republic) R Vik	1	4

Quarterfinals
(Germany) A Flock	5	3
(Croatia) A Veić	7	6
(Italy) A di Mauro	6^{10}	6	6
(Germany) J Reister	7	3	1

Semifinals
(Croatia) A Veić	7	7
(Italy) A di Mauro	5	5

=== Bottom half ===
First round
5	(Italy) T Tenconi	6^{5}	6	6^{3}
(Spain) D Marrero	7	1	7
Q	(Italy) A Brizzi	6	7
(Netherlands) T de Bakker	4	6^{2}
(Czech Republic) J Pospíšil	1	6	3
Q	(Spain) A Ramos Viñolas	6	4	6
(Italy) M Crugnola	2	4
4/WC	(Italy) F Volandri	6	6
6	(Argentina) S Decoud	1	6	2
(Romania) A Ungur	6	1	6
(Monaco) J-R Lisnard	6	6
(Peru) I Miranda	4	4
(Ukraine) I Marchenko	6^{4}	6	6^{1}
(Brazil) R Dutra da Silva	7	2	7
(Italy) A Stoppini	2	1
2	(France) A Mannarino	6	6

Second round
(Spain) D Marrero	6	6
Q	(Italy) A Brizzi	4	4
Q	(Spain) A Ramos Viñolas	6	6
4/WC	(Italy) F Volandri	3	3
(Romania) A Ungur	6^{8}	4
(Monaco) J-R Lisnard	7	6
(Brazil) R Dutra da Silva	3	1
2	(France) A Mannarino	6	6

Quarterfinals
(Spain) D Marrero	6	6
Q	(Spain) A Ramos Viñolas	3	4
(Monaco) J-R Lisnard	7	6
2	(France) A Mannarino	5	2

Semifinals
(Spain) D Marrero	7	6
(Monaco) J-R Lisnard	6^{5}	3
