= 2011 Internazionali di Monza e Brianza – Singles =

Singles
- 2011 Internazionali di Monza e Brianza

Final
- Champion: (Germany) Julian Reister
- Runner-up: (Italy) Alessio di Mauro
- Score: 2–6, 6–3, 6–3

Events
Singles	Doubles
← 2010 ·	Internazionali di Monza e Brianza	· 2012 →

Daniel Brands was the defending champion; however, he decided not to compete.
Julian Reister won this tournament, beating Alessio di Mauro 2–6, 6–3, 6–3 in the final.

== Seeds ==
1. (Czech Republic) Jan Hájek (first round)
2. (Germany) Denis Gremelmayr (first round)
3. (Czech Republic) Jaroslav Pospíšil (first round)
4. (Turkey) Marsel İlhan (quarterfinals)
5. (Austria) ~~Andreas Haider-Maurer~~ (withdrew due to right knee injury)
6. (Poland) Łukasz Kubot (second round)
7. (Germany) Julian Reister (champion)
8. (Czech Republic) Lukáš Rosol (withdrew)
9. (Germany) Simon Greul (semifinals)

== Draw ==
=== Key ===
- Q = Qualifier
- WC = Wild card
- LL = Lucky loser
- Alt = Alternate
- SE = Special exempt
- PR = Protected ranking
- ITF = ITF entry
- JE = Junior exempt
- w/o = Walkover
- r = Retired
- d = Defaulted
- SR = Special ranking

=== Finals ===
Semifinals
(Italy) Alessio di Mauro	6	2	6
9	(Germany) Simon Greul	4	6	2
(Germany) Andreas Beck	3	6	3
7	(Germany) Julian Reister	6	3	6

Final
(Italy) Alessio di Mauro	6	3	3
7	(Germany) Julian Reister	2	6	6

=== Top half ===
First round
1	(Czech Republic) J Hájek	2	4
(Italy) A di Mauro	6	6
WC	(Austria) T Muster	5	2
(France) D Guez	7	6
(Austria) M Fischer	7	3	7
LL	(Italy) M Crugnola	6^{6}	6	6^{0}
Q	(Monaco) B Balleret	6	6
LL	(Austria) P Oswald	3	3
3	(Czech Republic) J Pospíšil	6	2	4
(Spain) G Olaso	2	6	6
Q	(Italy) G Naso	6	3	6
(Hungary) A Balázs	4	6	1
(France) S Robert	4	3
WC	(Italy) Andrea Arnaboldi	6	6
Q	(Italy) A Brizzi	4	4
9	(Germany) S Greul	6	6

Second round
(Italy) A di Mauro	6	6
(France) D Guez	3	1
(Austria) M Fischer	6	6
Q	(Monaco) B Balleret	3	4
(Spain) G Olaso	6	5	6
Q	(Italy) G Naso	2	7	4
WC	(Italy) Andrea Arnaboldi	6^{2}	3
9	(Germany) S Greul	7	6

Quarterfinals
(Italy) A di Mauro	7	4	6
(Austria) M Fischer	6^{8}	6	4
(Spain) G Olaso	2	1
9	(Germany) S Greul	6	6

Semifinals
(Italy) A di Mauro	6	2	6
9	(Germany) S Greul	4	6	2

=== Bottom half ===
First round
6	(Poland) Ł Kubot	6	7
(Romania) M Copil	1	5
(Germany) A Beck	6	6
LL	(Brazil) L Kirche	4	2
WC	(Italy) S Ianni	1	6^{4}
(Romania) V Crivoi	6	7
(Germany) B Knittel	4	6	6^{5}
4	(Turkey) M İlhan	6	3	7
7	(Germany) J Reister	7	6
(Italy) S Vagnozzi	6^{3}	4
(Russia) K Kravchuk	1	1
(Argentina) F Delbonis	6	6
(Russia) E Donskoy	6	6
WC	(Lithuania) L Grigelis	1	2
Q	(France) K de Schepper	6	7
2	(Germany) D Gremelmayr	2	5

Second round
6	(Poland) Ł Kubot	5	6^{6}
(Germany) A Beck	7	7
(Romania) V Crivoi	2	6^{4}
4	(Turkey) M İlhan	6	7
7	(Germany) J Reister	4	7	6
(Argentina) F Delbonis	6	6^{7}	1
(Russia) E Donskoy	6	6
Q	(France) K de Schepper	4	3

Quarterfinals
(Germany) A Beck	6	6^{5}	6
4	(Turkey) M İlhan	3	7	1
7	(Germany) J Reister	6	6
(Russia) E Donskoy	1	2

Semifinals
(Germany) A Beck	3	6	3
7	(Germany) J Reister	6	3	6
