= 2011 Torneo Omnia Tenis Ciudad Madrid – Doubles =

Doubles
- 2011 Torneo Omnia Tenis Ciudad Madrid

Final
- Champions: (Spain) David Marrero (Spain) Rubén Ramírez Hidalgo
- Runners-up: (Spain) Daniel Gimeno-Traver (United Kingdom) Morgan Phillips
- Score: 6–4, 6–7^{(8–10)}, [11–9]

Events
Singles	Doubles
- Torneo Omnia Tenis Ciudad Madrid

David Marrero and Rubén Ramírez Hidalgo won the first edition of this tournament, defeating Daniel Gimeno-Traver and Morgan Phillips, 6–4, 6–7^{(8–10)}, [11–9] in the final.

== Seeds ==
1. (Spain) David Marrero / (Spain) Rubén Ramírez Hidalgo (champions)
2. (Australia) Colin Ebelthite / (Czech Republic) Jaroslav Pospíšil (first round)
3. (Spain) Adrián Menéndez / (Spain) Gabriel Trujillo-Soler (semifinals)
4. (Spain) Guillermo Olaso / (India) Purav Raja (semifinals)

== Draw ==
Key

- Q = Qualifier
- WC = Wild card
- LL = Lucky loser
- Alt = Alternate
- ITF = ITF entry
- PR = Protected ranking
- SR = Special ranking
- SE = Special exempt
- JE = Junior exempt
- JR = Junior Accelerator Programme entrant
- CO = College Accelerator Programme entrant
- NG = Next Gen Accelerator Program entrant
- w/o = Walkover
- r = Retired
- d = Defaulted

=== Draw ===
First round
1	(Spain) D Marrero (Spain) R Ramírez Hidalgo	6	6
(Serbia) N Ćirić (Montenegro) G Tošić	4	2
(Spain) Iván Arenas-Gualda (Spain) Roberto Ortega-Olmedo	5	3
(Spain) P Riba (Portugal) J Sousa	7	6
3	(Spain) A Menéndez (Spain) G Trujillo-Soler	3	7	[10]
WC	(Spain) G Alcaide (Russia) N Nesterov	6	5	[4]
(Germany) D Brands (Germany) Jan-Lennard Struff	5	1
(Spain) I Cervantes-Huegun (Spain) J Martí	7	6
(Spain) R Bautista-Agut (Spain) I Navarro	6	6
WC	(Spain) Alejandro Andino Vallverdu (Spain) Iván Gómez Mantilla	2	1
WC	(Spain) Javier Baños Pantoja (Spain) Antonio García Sánchez	4	7	[10]
4	(Spain) G Olaso (India) P Raja	6	5	[12]
(France) V Millot (France) É Prodon	3	3
(Spain) G Fraile (France) R Jouan	6	6
(Spain) D Gimeno-Traver (United Kingdom) M Phillips	3	6	[13]
2	(Australia) C Ebelthite (Czech Republic) J Pospíšil	6	4	[11]

Quarterfinals
1	(Spain) D Marrero (Spain) R Ramírez Hidalgo	6	3	[10]
(Spain) P Riba (Portugal) J Sousa	4	6	[8]
3	(Spain) A Menéndez (Spain) G Trujillo-Soler	6	6
(Spain) I Cervantes-Huegun (Spain) J Martí	3	1
(Spain) R Bautista-Agut (Spain) I Navarro	3	2
4	(Spain) G Olaso (India) P Raja	6	6
(Spain) G Fraile (France) R Jouan	4	2
(Spain) D Gimeno-Traver (United Kingdom) M Phillips	6	6

Semifinals
1	(Spain) D Marrero (Spain) R Ramírez Hidalgo	6	6^{6}	[10]
3	(Spain) A Menéndez (Spain) G Trujillo-Soler	3	7^{8}	[7]
4	(Spain) G Olaso (India) P Raja	6	5	[8]
(Spain) D Gimeno-Traver (United Kingdom) M Phillips	4	7	[10]

Final
1	(Spain) D Marrero (Spain) R Ramírez Hidalgo	4	7^{10}	[11]
(Spain) D Gimeno-Traver (United Kingdom) M Phillips	6	6^{8}	[9]
