= 2012 Torneo Omnia Tenis Ciudad Madrid – Doubles =

Doubles
- 2012 Torneo Omnia Tenis Ciudad Madrid

Final
- Champions: (Spain) Daniel Gimeno-Traver (Spain) Iván Navarro
- Runners-up: (Australia) Colin Ebelthite (Czech Republic) Jaroslav Pospíšil
- Score: 6–2, 4–6, [10–7]

Events
Singles	Doubles
- Torneo Omnia Tenis Ciudad Madrid

David Marrero and Rubén Ramírez Hidalgo were the defending champions but Marrero decided not to participate.
Hidalgo played alongside Daniel Muñoz de la Nava.
Daniel Gimeno-Traver and Iván Navarro defeated Colin Ebelthite and Jaroslav Pospíšil 6–2, 4–6, [10–7] in the final to win the title.

== Seeds ==
1. (Germany) Andre Begemann / (Germany) Martin Emmrich (semifinals)
2. (Australia) Colin Ebelthite / (Czech Republic) Jaroslav Pospíšil (final)
3. (Spain) Daniel Muñoz de la Nava / (Spain) Rubén Ramírez Hidalgo (semifinals)
4. (Spain) Daniel Gimeno-Traver / (Spain) Iván Navarro (champions)

== Draw ==
Key

- Q = Qualifier
- WC = Wild card
- LL = Lucky loser
- Alt = Alternate
- ITF = ITF entry
- PR = Protected ranking
- SR = Special ranking
- SE = Special exempt
- JE = Junior exempt
- JR = Junior Accelerator Programme entrant
- CO = College Accelerator Programme entrant
- NG = Next Gen Accelerator Program entrant
- w/o = Walkover
- r = Retired
- d = Defaulted

=== Draw ===
First round
1	(Germany) A Begemann (Germany) M Emmrich	6	6
(Italy) A Giannessi (Italy) A Motti	1	4
(Spain) Iván Arenas-Gualda (Spain) E López-Pérez	6	6
WC	(Spain) Iván Gómez Mantilla (Spain) Pedro Salas	4	3
4	(Spain) D Gimeno-Traver (Spain) I Navarro	6	7
(Germany) J-L Struff (Germany) P Torebko	3	5
(Argentina) F Delbonis (Spain) S Gutiérrez Ferrol	6	6
Alt	(Netherlands) Romano Frantzen (United Kingdom) A Ward	3	4
(Slovakia) P Červenák (Germany) A Satschko	6	7^{7}
Alt	(Spain) Ó Burrieza-López (Spain) S Pérez-Pérez	1	6^{5}
(Spain) A Brugués-Davi (Portugal) J Sousa	2	0
3	(Spain) D Muñoz de la Nava (Spain) R Ramírez Hidalgo	6	6
(Argentina) F Argüello (Spain) J Martí	7^{7}	6
WC	(Spain) Antonio Sánchez García (Spain) Ricardo Villacorta-Alonso	6^{5}	4
WC	(Spain) R Ortega-Olmedo (Spain) Jaime Pulgar-García	2	4
2	(Australia) C Ebelthite (Czech Republic) J Pospíšil	6	6

Quarterfinals
1	(Germany) A Begemann (Germany) M Emmrich	6	6
(Spain) I Arenas-Gualda (Spain) E López-Pérez	3	2
4	(Spain) D Gimeno-Traver (Spain) I Navarro	w/o
(Argentina) F Delbonis (Spain) S Gutiérrez Ferrol
(Slovakia) P Červenák (Germany) A Satschko	6	3	[5]
3	(Spain) D Muñoz de la Nava (Spain) R Ramírez Hidalgo	3	6	[10]
(Argentina) F Argüello (Spain) J Martí	5	5
2	(Australia) C Ebelthite (Czech Republic) J Pospíšil	7	7

Semifinals
1	(Germany) A Begemann (Germany) M Emmrich	2	3
4	(Spain) D Gimeno-Traver (Spain) I Navarro	6	6
3	(Spain) D Muñoz de la Nava (Spain) R Ramírez Hidalgo	4	2
2	(Australia) C Ebelthite (Czech Republic) J Pospíšil	6	6

Final
4	(Spain) D Gimeno-Traver (Spain) I Navarro	6	4	[10]
2	(Australia) C Ebelthite (Czech Republic) J Pospíšil	2	6	[7]
