= 2011 Internazionali di Monza e Brianza – Doubles =

Doubles
- 2011 Internazionali di Monza e Brianza

Final
- Champions: (Sweden) Johan Brunström (Denmark) Frederik Nielsen
- Runners-up: (United Kingdom) Jamie Delgado (United Kingdom) Jonathan Marray
- Score: 5–7, 6–2, [10–7]

Events
Singles	Doubles
← 2010 ·	Internazionali di Monza e Brianza	· 2012 →

Daniele Bracciali and David Marrero were the defending champions but decided not to participate.
Johan Brunström and Frederik Nielsen won this tournament, defeating Jamie Delgado and Jonathan Marray 5–7, 6–2, [10–7] in the final.

== Seeds ==
1. (Germany) Philipp Marx / (Germany) Frank Moser (semifinals)
2. (United States) Brian Battistone / (Philippines) Treat Conrad Huey (first round)
3. (Sweden) Johan Brunström / (Denmark) Frederik Nielsen (champions)
4. (United Kingdom) Jamie Delgado / (United Kingdom) Jonathan Marray (final)

== Draw ==
=== Key ===
- Q = Qualifier
- WC = Wild card
- LL = Lucky loser
- Alt = Alternate
- SE = Special exempt
- PR = Protected ranking
- ITF = ITF entry
- JE = Junior exempt
- w/o = Walkover
- r = Retired
- d = Defaulted
- SR = Special ranking

=== Draw ===
First round
1	(Germany) P Marx (Germany) F Moser	6	7
(Italy) A Motti (Austria) P Oswald	3	6^{3}
WC	(Italy) Marco Baio (Italy) S Ianni	3	2
(Poland) T Bednarek (Sweden) A Siljeström	6	6
4	(United Kingdom) J Delgado (United Kingdom) J Marray	6	6
(United States) D Martin (Austria) M Slanar	3	2
WC	(Brazil) L Kirche (Brazil) Vinicius Trevisan	0	2
(Germany) A Beck (Austria) M Fischer	6	6
(Australia) R Junaid (Australia) J Kerr	4	7	[7]
(Italy) A di Mauro (Italy) S Vagnozzi	6	6^{7}	[10]
(Germany) M Emmrich (Poland) M Kowalczyk	2	3
3	(Sweden) J Brunström (Denmark) F Nielsen	6	6
WC	(Italy) Nicolo Cotto (France) Yann Dupuy	1	1
(Germany) S Greul (India) P Raja	6	6
Alt	(Germany) J Reister (France) S Robert	6	1	[10]
2	(United States) B Battistone (Philippines) TC Huey	4	6	[6]

Quarterfinals
1	(Germany) P Marx (Germany) F Moser	4	6	[11]
(Poland) T Bednarek (Sweden) A Siljeström	6	3	[9]
4	(United Kingdom) J Delgado (United Kingdom) J Marray	6	7
(Germany) A Beck (Austria) M Fischer	3	6^{7}
(Italy) A di Mauro (Italy) S Vagnozzi	6^{3}	2
3	(Sweden) J Brunström (Denmark) F Nielsen	7	6
(Germany) S Greul (India) P Raja	3	7	[10]
Alt	(Germany) J Reister (France) S Robert	6	6^{5}	[6]

Semifinals
1	(Germany) P Marx (Germany) F Moser	6^{3}	6	[5]
4	(United Kingdom) J Delgado (United Kingdom) J Marray	7	4	[10]
3	(Sweden) J Brunström (Denmark) F Nielsen	7	6
(Germany) S Greul (India) P Raja	6^{8}	2

Final
4	(United Kingdom) J Delgado (United Kingdom) J Marray	7	2	[7]
3	(Sweden) J Brunström (Denmark) F Nielsen	5	6	[10]
