= 2011 Torneo Omnia Tenis Ciudad Madrid – Singles =

Singles
- 2011 Torneo Omnia Tenis Ciudad Madrid

Final
- Champion: (France) Jérémy Chardy
- Runner-up: (Spain) Daniel Gimeno-Traver
- Score: 6–1, 5–7, 7–6^{(7–3)}

Events
Singles	Doubles
- Torneo Omnia Tenis Ciudad Madrid

Jérémy Chardy won the title, defeating Daniel Gimeno-Traver 6–1, 5–7, 7–6^{(7–3)} in the final.

== Seeds ==
1. (Portugal) Rui Machado (semifinals)
2. (Spain) Pere Riba (first round)
3. (Spain) Daniel Gimeno-Traver (final)
4. (France) Éric Prodon (quarterfinals)
5. (France) Jérémy Chardy (champion)
6. (Italy) Paolo Lorenzi (quarterfinals)
7. (Spain) Rubén Ramírez Hidalgo (semifinals)
8. (Russia) Evgeny Donskoy (second round)

== Draw ==
Key

- Q = Qualifier
- WC = Wild card
- LL = Lucky loser
- Alt = Alternate
- ITF = ITF entry
- PR = Protected ranking
- SR = Special ranking
- SE = Special exempt
- JE = Junior exempt
- JR = Junior Accelerator Programme entrant
- CO = College Accelerator Programme entrant
- NG = Next Gen Accelerator Program entrant
- w/o = Walkover
- r = Retired
- d = Defaulted

=== Finals ===
Semifinals
1	(Portugal) Rui Machado	1	4
3	(Spain) Daniel Gimeno-Traver	6	6
5	(France) Jérémy Chardy	6	7
7	(Spain) Rubén Ramírez Hidalgo	3	5

Final
3	(Spain) Daniel Gimeno-Traver	1	7	6^{3}
5	(France) Jérémy Chardy	6	5	7^{7}

=== Top half ===
First round
1	(Portugal) R Machado	6	1	6
Q	(Germany) Jan-Lennard Struff	1	6	2
Q	(Germany) P Torebko	6	6
Q	(United Kingdom) M Phillips	1	0
SE	(Spain) I Cervantes-Huegun	6	6
(Italy) M Viola	2	0
(Germany) D Brands	3	3
6	(Italy) P Lorenzi	6	6
3	(Spain) D Gimeno-Traver	7	2	6
(Spain) A Menéndez	5	6	4
Q	(France) R Jouan	2	4
(Spain) R Bautista-Agut	6	6
(Spain) D Muñoz-de la Nava	7	4	4
(Spain) G Olaso	5	6	6
WC	(Spain) Roberto Ortega-Olmedo	6	3	4
8	(Russia) E Donskoy	3	6	6

Second round
1	(Portugal) R Machado	6	6
Q	(Germany) P Torebko	3	3
SE	(Spain) I Cervantes-Huegun	4	3
6	(Italy) P Lorenzi	6	6
3	(Spain) D Gimeno-Traver	6	3	6
(Spain) R Bautista-Agut	4	6	3
(Spain) G Olaso	7^{7}	3	6
8	(Russia) E Donskoy	6^{5}	6	4

Quarterfinals
1	(Portugal) R Machado	6	6
6	(Italy) P Lorenzi	3	3
3	(Spain) D Gimeno-Traver	7^{7}	7
(Spain) G Olaso	6^{5}	5

Semifinals
1	(Portugal) R Machado	1	4
3	(Spain) D Gimeno-Traver	6	6

=== Bottom half ===
First round
5	(France) J Chardy	6	6
WC	(Spain) Javier Baños Pantoja	3	2
LL	(Switzerland) M Lammer	6	7^{7}
(Poland) J Janowicz	4	6^{4}
(Republic of Ireland) C Niland	6	6
WC	(Spain) Iván Arenas-Gualda	4	3
(Portugal) J Sousa	4	6	6^{4}
4	(France) É Prodon	6	2	7^{7}
7	(Spain) R Ramírez Hidalgo	6	6
(France) V Millot	1	4
(Spain) J Martí	6	7
LL	(Russia) I Belyaev	3	5
(Serbia) N Ćirić	0	4
(Spain) I Navarro	6	6
(Czech Republic) J Pospíšil	6	6
2	(Spain) P Riba	4	3

Second round
5	(France) J Chardy	6	6^{3}	6
LL	(Switzerland) M Lammer	2	7^{7}	4
(Republic of Ireland) C Niland	6^{1}	0
4	(France) É Prodon	7^{7}	6
7	(Spain) R Ramírez Hidalgo	6	6
(Spain) J Martí	4	4
(Spain) I Navarro	3	6	6
(Czech Republic) J Pospíšil	6	4	3

Quarterfinals
5	(France) J Chardy	6	6
4	(France) É Prodon	3	1
7	(Spain) R Ramírez Hidalgo	7	6
(Spain) I Navarro	5	2

Semifinals
5	(France) J Chardy	6	7
7	(Spain) R Ramírez Hidalgo	3	5
