= 2012 Internazionali di Monza e Brianza – Doubles =

Doubles
- 2012 Internazionali di Monza e Brianza

Final
- Champions: (Kazakhstan) Andrey Golubev (Kazakhstan) Yuri Schukin
- Runners-up: (Russia) Teymuraz Gabashvili (Italy) Stefano Ianni
- Score: 7–6^{(7–4)}, 5–7, [10–7]

Events
| Singles | Doubles |
| ← 2011 · | Internazionali di Monza e Brianza | · 2013 → |

Johan Brunström and Frederik Nielsen were the defending champions but decided not to participate.
Andrey Golubev and Yuri Schukin won the title by defeating Teymuraz Gabashvili and Stefano Ianni 7–6^{(7–4)}, 5–7, [10–7] in the final.

== Seeds ==
1. (Australia) Rameez Junaid / (India) Purav Raja (quarterfinals)
2. (Russia) Teymuraz Gabashvili / (Italy) Stefano Ianni (runners-up)
3. (Spain) Iñigo Cervantes Huegun / (Spain) Daniel Gimeno-Traver (quarterfinals, withdrew)
4. (Italy) Alessio di Mauro / (Italy) Gianluca Naso (first round)

== Draw ==
=== Key ===
- Q = Qualifier
- WC = Wild card
- LL = Lucky loser
- Alt = Alternate
- SE = Special exempt
- PR = Protected ranking
- ITF = ITF entry
- JE = Junior exempt
- w/o = Walkover
- r = Retired
- d = Defaulted
- SR = Special ranking

=== Draw ===
First round
1 | (Australia) R Junaid (India) P Raja | 6 | 6
WC | (Brazil) J Silva (Brazil) Vinicius Trevisan | 2 | 1
(Kazakhstan) A Golubev (Kazakhstan) Y Schukin | 7^{7} | 3 | [10]
(Argentina) D Junqueira (Argentina) Nicolás Pastor | 6^{2} | 6 | [7]
3 | (Spain) I Cervantes Huegun (Spain) D Gimeno-Traver | 6 | 6
WC | (Italy) Antonio Comporto (Italy) Edoardo Eremin | 1 | 2
(Bosnia and Herzegovina) M Bašić (United States) D Zivkovic | 6 | 3 | [6]
(Serbia) B Pašanski (Croatia) A Veić | 2 | 6 | [10]
(Brazil) R Dutra da Silva (Argentina) M González | 6 | 6
WC | (Italy) Marco Baio (Italy) Luca Ottavi | 1 | 1
(Italy) W Trusendi (Italy) M Viola | 6 | 6
4 | (Italy) A di Mauro (Italy) G Naso | 4 | 3
(Brazil) T Alves (Brazil) Rodrigo-Antonio Grilli | 6^{2} | 6 | [14]
(Argentina) M Alund (Argentina) G Pella | 7^{7} | 4 | [16]
(Spain) J Martí (Spain) D Muñoz de la Nava | 6 | 2 | [5]
2 | (Russia) T Gabashvili (Italy) S Ianni | 3 | 6 | [10]

Quarterfinals
1 | (Australia) R Junaid (India) P Raja | 6^{4} | 5
(Kazakhstan) A Golubev (Kazakhstan) Y Schukin | 7^{7} | 7
3 | (Spain) I Cervantes Huegun (Spain) D Gimeno-Traver | w/o
(Serbia) B Pašanski (Croatia) A Veić
(Brazil) R Dutra da Silva (Argentina) M González | 2 | 1
(Italy) W Trusendi (Italy) M Viola | 6 | 6
(Argentina) M Alund (Argentina) G Pella | 6 | 6^{3} | [6]
2 | (Russia) T Gabashvili (Italy) S Ianni | 3 | 7^{7} | [10]

Semifinals
(Kazakhstan) A Golubev (Kazakhstan) Y Schukin | 6 | 6
(Serbia) B Pašanski (Croatia) A Veić | 1 | 1
(Italy) W Trusendi (Italy) M Viola | 6 | 2 | [5]
2 | (Russia) T Gabashvili (Italy) S Ianni | 3 | 6 | [10]

Final
(Kazakhstan) A Golubev (Kazakhstan) Y Schukin | 7 | 5 | [10]
2 | (Russia) T Gabashvili (Italy) S Ianni | 5 | 7 | [7]
