= 2011 BNP Paribas Open – Men's singles qualifying =

Men's singles qualifying
- 2011 BNP Paribas Open

Events
Singles	men	women
Doubles	men	women
← 2010 ·	BNP Paribas Open	· 2012 →

The 2011 BNP Paribas Open was a tennis tournament played at Indian Wells, California in March 2011. It was the 38th edition for the men's & 23rd for the women's event. This article displays the qualifying draw of the 2011 BNP Paribas Open men's singles.

== Players ==
=== Seeds ===
1. (Germany) Daniel Brands (qualifying competition)
2. (India) Somdev Devvarman (qualified)
3. (United States) Robert Kendrick (first round)
4. (United States) Michael Russell (qualified)
5. (United States) Ryan Sweeting (qualified)
6. (Germany) Julian Reister (first round)
7. (United States) Alex Bogomolov Jr. (qualified)
8. (Australia) Marinko Matosevic (qualified)
9. (United States) Donald Young (qualified)
10. (Spain) Daniel Muñoz-de la Nava (qualifying competition)
11. (South Africa) Izak van der Merwe (qualifying competition)
12. (United States) Bobby Reynolds (qualifying competition)
13. (South Africa) Rik de Voest (qualified)
14. (United States) Tim Smyczek (qualified)
15. (Italy) Flavio Cipolla (qualified)
16. (Spain) Iván Navarro (first round)
17. (Australia) Matthew Ebden (qualified)
18. (United States) Alex Kuznetsov (qualifying competition)
19. (Austria) Stefan Koubek (first round)
20. (Canada) Frank Dancevic (qualifying competition)
21. (Canada) Peter Polansky (first round)
22. (Italy) Matteo Viola (first round)
23. (United States) Jesse Witten (qualifying competition)
24. (United States) Rajeev Ram (first round, retired)

=== Qualifiers ===
1. (India) Rohan Bopanna
2. (India) Somdev Devvarman
3. (United States) Tim Smyczek
4. (United States) Michael Russell
5. (United States) Ryan Sweeting
6. (Italy) Flavio Cipolla
7. (United States) Alex Bogomolov Jr.
8. (Australia) Marinko Matosevic
9. (United States) Donald Young
10. (Australia) Chris Guccione
11. (Australia) Matthew Ebden
12. (South Africa) Rik de Voest

== Qualifying draw ==
=== Key ===
- Q = Qualifier
- WC = Wild card
- LL = Lucky loser
- Alt = Alternate
- SE = Special exempt
- PR = Protected ranking
- ITF = ITF entry
- JE = Junior exempt
- w/o = Walkover
- r = Retired
- d = Defaulted
- SR = Special ranking

=== First qualifier ===
First round
1	(Germany) Daniel Brands	6	7
(United States) Scott Lipsky	0	5
Alt	(India) Rohan Bopanna	7	3	7
21	(Canada) Peter Polansky	6^{6}	6	5

Qualifying competition
1	(Germany) Daniel Brands	6^{5}	6^{4}
Alt	(India) Rohan Bopanna	7	7

=== Second qualifier ===
First round
2	(India) Somdev Devvarman	6	6
(United States) Michael McClune	3	1
(Australia) Greg Jones	6	6
19	(Austria) Stefan Koubek	2	3

Qualifying competition
2	(India) Somdev Devvarman	6	6
(Australia) Greg Jones	2	4

=== Third qualifier ===
First round
3	(United States) Robert Kendrick	6	3	4
(Argentina) Sebastián Decoud	1	6	6
WC	(United States) Daniel Kosakowski	3	2
14	(United States) Tim Smyczek	6	6

Qualifying competition
(Argentina) Sebastián Decoud	1	2
14	(United States) Tim Smyczek	6	6

=== Fourth qualifier ===
First round
4	(United States) Michael Russell	6	6
(Slovakia) Ivo Klec	3	2
(Moldova) Roman Borvanov	3	6	4
18	(United States) Alex Kuznetsov	6	3	6

Qualifying competition
4	(United States) Michael Russell	6	7
18	(United States) Alex Kuznetsov	3	5

=== Fifth qualifier ===
First round
5/WC	(United States) Ryan Sweeting	6	6
(Australia) Samuel Groth	3	1
(United States) Eric Nunez	2	2
23	(United States) Jesse Witten	6	6

Qualifying competition
5/WC	(United States) Ryan Sweeting	6	6
23	(United States) Jesse Witten	1	4

=== Sixth qualifier ===
First round
6	(Germany) Julian Reister	0	6^{3}
(Slovenia) Luka Gregorc	6	7
(United States) Phillip Simmonds	2	2
15	(Italy) Flavio Cipolla	6	6

Qualifying competition
(Slovenia) Luka Gregorc	2	7	5
15	(Italy) Flavio Cipolla	6	6^{4}	7

=== Seventh qualifier ===
First round
7	(United States) Alex Bogomolov Jr.	6	6
(Italy) Stefano Ianni	0	2
WC	(United States) Steve Johnson	6^{3}	6	6^{4}
20	(Canada) Frank Dancevic	7	4	7

Qualifying competition
7	(United States) Alex Bogomolov Jr.	6	1	6
20	(Canada) Frank Dancevic	4	6	3

=== Eighth qualifier ===
First round
8	(Australia) Marinko Matosevic	6	6
(Serbia) Dušan Vemić	4	1
(South Africa) Raven Klaasen	5	6	7
22	(Italy) Matteo Viola	7	1	6^{5}

Qualifying competition
8	(Australia) Marinko Matosevic	7	6
(South Africa) Raven Klaasen	6^{4}	4

=== Ninth qualifier ===
First round
9	(United States) Donald Young	6	7
WC	(United States) Denis Kudla	2	6^{4}
WC	(Czech Republic) Rudolf Siwy	6	0
24	(United States) Rajeev Ram	4	0^{r}

Qualifying competition
9	(United States) Donald Young	6	7
WC	(Czech Republic) Rudolf Siwy	2	6^{5}

=== Tenth qualifier ===
First round
10	(Spain) Daniel Muñoz-de la Nava	6	6^{6}	5
(Haiti) Olivier Sajous	3	7	0r
(Australia) Chris Guccione	7	6
16	(Spain) Iván Navarro	6^{7}	2

Qualifying competition
10	(Spain) Daniel Muñoz-de la Nava	4	3
(Australia) Chris Guccione	6	6

=== Eleventh qualifier ===
First round
11	(South Africa) Izak van der Merwe	6	6
(Chinese Taipei) Jimmy Wang	3	2
(Austria) Oliver Marach	3	6^{3}
17	(Australia) Matthew Ebden	6	7

Qualifying competition
11	(South Africa) Izak van der Merwe	4	5
17	(Australia) Matthew Ebden	6	7

=== Twelfth qualifier ===
First round
12	(United States) Bobby Reynolds	6	6
(United States) Lester Cook	3	0
(United States) Greg Ouellette	3	2
13	(South Africa) Rik de Voest	6	6

Qualifying competition
12	(United States) Bobby Reynolds	3	3
13	(South Africa) Rik de Voest	6	6
