= 2012 Torneo Omnia Tenis Ciudad Madrid =

Tennis tournament

- Date: 24 – 30 September
- Edition: 2nd
- Surface: Clay
- Location: Madrid, Spain

Champions

Singles
- (Spain) Daniel Gimeno Traver

Doubles
- (Spain) Daniel Gimeno Traver / (Spain) Iván Navarro
← 2011 ·	Torneo Omnia Tenis Ciudad Madrid

The 2012 Torneo Omnia Tenis Ciudad Madrid was a professional tennis tournament played on clay courts. It was the second edition of the tournament which was part of the 2012 ATP Challenger Tour. It took place in Madrid, Spain between 24 and 30 September 2012.

== Singles main draw entrants ==
=== Seeds ===
Country	Player	Rank^{1}	Seed
ITA	Filippo Volandri	75	1
ESP	Rubén Ramírez Hidalgo	91	2
ESP	Albert Montañés	92	3
ESP	Daniel Gimeno Traver	93	4
POR	João Sousa	109	5
ESP	Iñigo Cervantes	136	6
CRO	Antonio Veić	137	7
ARG	Federico Delbonis	140	8

- ^{1} Rankings are as of September 17, 2012.

=== Other entrants ===
The following players received wildcards into the singles main draw:

- (Spain) Iván Arenas-Gualda
- (Spain) Enrique Lopez-Perez
- (Spain) Roberto Ortega-Olmedo
- (Spain) Jaime Pulgar-Garcia

The following players received entry as an alternate into the singles main draw:

- (Germany) Jan-Lennard Struff

The following players received entry from the qualifying draw:

- (Russia) Alexander Lobkov
- (Czech Republic) Jaroslav Pospíšil
- (Netherlands) Nick van der Meer
- (United Kingdom) Alexander Ward

== Champions ==
=== Singles ===
- (Spain) Daniel Gimeno Traver def. (Germany) Jan-Lennard Struff, 6–4, 6–2

=== Doubles ===
- (Spain) Daniel Gimeno Traver / (Spain) Iván Navarro def. (Australia) Colin Ebelthite / (Czech Republic) Jaroslav Pospíšil, 6–2, 4–6, [10–7]
