= 2012 Torneo Omnia Tenis Ciudad Madrid – Singles =

Singles
- 2012 Torneo Omnia Tenis Ciudad Madrid

Final
- Champion: (Spain) Daniel Gimeno-Traver
- Runner-up: (Germany) Jan-Lennard Struff
- Score: 6–4, 6–2

Events
Singles	Doubles
- Torneo Omnia Tenis Ciudad Madrid

Jérémy Chardy was the defending champion but chose not to compete.
Daniel Gimeno-Traver won the title after defeating Jan-Lennard Struff 6–4, 6–2 in the final.

== Seeds ==
1. (Italy) Filippo Volandri (quarterfinals)
2. (Spain) Rubén Ramírez Hidalgo (semifinals)
3. (Spain) Albert Montañés (second round)
4. (Spain) Daniel Gimeno-Traver (champion)
5. (Portugal) João Sousa (first round)
6. (Spain) Iñigo Cervantes (first round, retired because of back pain)
7. (Croatia) Antonio Veić (first round)
8. (Argentina) Federico Delbonis (quarterfinals)

== Draw ==
Key

- Q = Qualifier
- WC = Wild card
- LL = Lucky loser
- Alt = Alternate
- ITF = ITF entry
- PR = Protected ranking
- SR = Special ranking
- SE = Special exempt
- JE = Junior exempt
- JR = Junior Accelerator Programme entrant
- CO = College Accelerator Programme entrant
- NG = Next Gen Accelerator Program entrant
- w/o = Walkover
- r = Retired
- d = Defaulted

=== Finals ===
Semifinals
(Spain) Sergio Gutiérrez Ferrol	5	1
4	(Spain) Daniel Gimeno-Traver	7	6
Alt	(Germany) Jan-Lennard Struff	6	6
2	(Spain) Rubén Ramírez Hidalgo	3	0

Final
4	(Spain) Daniel Gimeno-Traver	6	6
Alt	(Germany) Jan-Lennard Struff	4	2

=== Top half ===
First round
1	(Italy) F Volandri	6	6
Q	(Russia) A Lobkov	3	0
(Italy) A Giannessi	6	7^{7}
(Slovakia) P Červenák	4	6^{5}
(Argentina) F Argüello	2	7	3
(France) J Dasnières de Veigy	6	5	6
(Spain) S Gutiérrez Ferrol	6	6
5	(Portugal) J Sousa	2	4
4	(Spain) D Gimeno-Traver	6	6
Q	(Czech Republic) J Pospíšil	3	2
(Spain) D Muñoz-de la Nava	4	6	6
(Spain) A Brugués-Davi	6	4	4
WC	(Spain) Jaime Pulgar-García	1	4
(Spain) I Navarro	6	6
(Spain) J Martí	5	6	1
8	(Argentina) F Delbonis	7	3	6

Second round
1	(Italy) F Volandri	6	6
(Italy) A Giannessi	2	2
(France) J Dasnières de Veigy	6^{3}	2
(Spain) S Gutiérrez Ferrol	7^{7}	6
4	(Spain) D Gimeno-Traver	6	7^{7}
(Spain) D Muñoz-de la Nava	2	6^{3}
(Spain) I Navarro	3	6^{3}
8	(Argentina) F Delbonis	6	7^{7}

Quarterfinals
1	(Italy) F Volandri	4	1
(Spain) S Gutiérrez Ferrol	6	6
4	(Spain) D Gimeno-Traver	6	6
8	(Argentina) F Delbonis	4	1

Semifinals
(Spain) S Gutiérrez Ferrol	5	1
4	(Spain) D Gimeno-Traver	7	6

=== Bottom half ===
First round
7	(Croatia) A Veić	6^{6}	6	0
(Portugal) P Sousa	7^{8}	3	6
Q	(United Kingdom) A Ward	6	6
WC	(Spain) Roberto Ortega-Olmedo	3	2
Alt	(Germany) J-L Struff	7^{9}	6
(Netherlands) B Westerhof	6^{7}	0
Q	(Netherlands) Nick Van der Meer	4	1
3	(Spain) A Montañés	6	6
6	(Spain) I Cervantes	5	6	1^{r}
(Spain) A Menéndez	7	3	4
(Serbia) F Krajinović	6^{6}	7	6
WC	(Spain) Enrique Lopez-Perez	7^{8}	5	3
(Germany) P Torebko	7^{9}	7^{7}
WC	(Spain) Iván Arenas-Gualda	6^{7}	6^{1}
(Italy) P Starace	3	4
2	(Spain) R Ramírez Hidalgo	6	6

Second round
(Portugal) P Sousa	6	4	1
Q	(United Kingdom) A Ward	2	6	6
Alt	(Germany) J-L Struff	6	6
3	(Spain) A Montañés	3	2
(Spain) A Menéndez	4
(Serbia) F Krajinović	0^{r}
(Germany) P Torebko	1	2
2	(Spain) R Ramírez Hidalgo	6	6

Quarterfinals
Q	(United Kingdom) A Ward	5	4
Alt	(Germany) J-L Struff	7	6
(Spain) A Menéndez	5	6	6^{5}
2	(Spain) R Ramírez Hidalgo	7	2	7^{7}

Semifinals
Alt	(Germany) J-L Struff	6	6
2	(Spain) R Ramírez Hidalgo	3	0
