= Mitsubishi Electric Cup =

Mitsubishi Electric Cup may refer to:

- Mitsubishi Electric Cup, a tennis tournament in Italy.
- ASEAN Mitsubishi Electric Cup, formerly AFF Mitsubishi Electric Cup, a football tournament in Southeast Asia.
