= 2012 Internazionali di Monza e Brianza =

- Date: June 11–17
- Edition: 8th
- Surface: Clay
- Location: Monza, Italy

Champions

Singles
- (Spain) Daniel Gimeno Traver

Doubles
- (Kazakhstan) Andrey Golubev / (Kazakhstan) Yuri Schukin
← 2011 ·	Internazionali di Monza e Brianza	· 2013 →

The 2012 Internazionali di Monza e Brianza was a professional tennis tournament played on clay courts. It was the eighth edition of the tournament which was part of the 2012 ATP Challenger Tour. It took place in Monza, Italy between 11 and 17 June 2012.

== ATP entrants ==
=== Seeds ===
Country	Player	Rank^{1}	Seed
ESP	Albert Montañés	65	1
ITA	Filippo Volandri	81	2
ITA	Potito Starace	97	3
SVN	Blaž Kavčič	99	4
GER	Michael Berrer	114	5
CRO	Antonio Veić	119	6
BRA	Rogério Dutra da Silva	121	7
ESP	Daniel Gimeno Traver	125	6

- ^{1} Rankings are as of May 28, 2012.

=== Other entrants ===
The following players received wildcards into the singles main draw:

- (Italy) Andrea Arnaboldi
- (Italy) Edoardo Eremin
- (Italy) Alessio di Mauro
- (Italy) Filippo Volandri

The following players received entry as a special exempt into the singles main draw:

- (Colombia) Alejandro González

The following players received entry from the qualifying draw:

- (Italy) Antonio Comporto
- (Argentina) Nicolás Pastor
- (Serbia) Boris Pašanski
- (Italy) Walter Trusendi

== Champions ==
=== Singles ===
- (Spain) Daniel Gimeno Traver def. (Spain) Albert Montañés, 6–2, 4–6, 6–4

=== Doubles ===
- (Kazakhstan) Andrey Golubev / (Kazakhstan) Yuri Schukin def. (Russia) Teymuraz Gabashvili / (Italy) Stefano Ianni, 7–6^{(7–4)}, 5–7, [10–7]
