= 2011 Internazionali di Monza e Brianza =

- Date: April 4 – April 10
- Edition: 7th
- Location: Monza, Italy

Champions

Singles
- (Germany) Julian Reister

Doubles
- (Sweden) Johan Brunström / (Denmark) Frederik Nielsen
← 2010 ·	Internazionali di Monza e Brianza	· 2012 →

The 2011 Internazionali di Monza e Brianza was a professional tennis tournament played on indoor red clay courts. It was part of the 2011 ATP Challenger Tour. It took place in Monza, Italy between 4 and 10 April 2011.

== ATP entrants ==
=== Seeds ===
Nationality	Player	Ranking*	Seeding
CZE	Jan Hájek	106	1
GER	Denis Gremelmayr	109	2
CZE	Jaroslav Pospíšil	112	3
TUR	Marsel İlhan	114	4
AUT	Andreas Haider-Maurer	116	5
POL	Łukasz Kubot	120	6
GER	Julian Reister	127	7
CZE	Lukáš Rosol	131	8

- Rankings are as of March 21, 2011.

=== Other entrants ===
The following players received wildcards into the singles main draw:

- (Italy) Andrea Arnaboldi
- (Lithuania) Laurynas Grigelis
- (Italy) Stefano Ianni
- (Austria) Thomas Muster

The following players received entry from the qualifying draw:

- (Monaco) Benjamin Balleret
- (Italy) Alberto Brizzi
- (France) Kenny de Schepper
- (Italy) Gianluca Naso

== Champions ==
=== Singles ===
(Germany) Julian Reister def. (Italy) Alessio di Mauro, 2–6, 6–3, 6–3

=== Doubles ===
(Sweden) Johan Brunström / (Denmark) Frederik Nielsen def. (United Kingdom) Jamie Delgado / (United Kingdom) Jonathan Marray, 5–7, 6–2, [10–7]
