= 2012 Internazionali di Monza e Brianza – Singles =

Singles
- 2012 Internazionali di Monza e Brianza

Final
- Champion: (Spain) Daniel Gimeno Traver
- Runner-up: (Spain) Albert Montañés
- Score: 6–2, 4–6, 6–4

Events
Singles	Doubles
- Internazionali di Monza e Brianza

Julian Reister was the defending champion.

Daniel Gimeno Traver won the final after defeating Albert Montañés 6–2, 4–6, 6–4 in the final.

== Seeds ==
1. (Spain) Albert Montañés (final)
2. (Italy) Filippo Volandri (quarterfinals)
3. (Italy) Potito Starace (quarterfinals)
4. (Slovenia) Blaž Kavčič (semifinals, withdrew)
5. (Germany) Michael Berrer (first round)
6. (Croatia) Antonio Veić (quarterfinals)
7. (Brazil) Rogério Dutra da Silva (second round)
8. (Spain) Daniel Gimeno Traver (champion)

== Draw ==
Key

- Q = Qualifier
- WC = Wild card
- LL = Lucky loser
- Alt = Alternate
- ITF = ITF entry
- PR = Protected ranking
- SR = Special ranking
- SE = Special exempt
- JE = Junior exempt
- JR = Junior Accelerator Programme entrant
- CO = College Accelerator Programme entrant
- NG = Next Gen Accelerator Program entrant
- w/o = Walkover
- r = Retired
- d = Defaulted

=== Finals ===
Semifinals
1	(Spain) Albert Montañés	w/o
4	(Slovenia) Blaž Kavčič
8	(Spain) Daniel Gimeno Traver	7	6
(Argentina) Máximo González	5	3

Finals
1	(Spain) Albert Montañés	2	6	4
8	(Spain) Daniel Gimeno Traver	6	4	6

=== Top half ===
First round
1	(Spain) A Montañés	4	6	6
WC	(Italy) A di Mauro	6	2	1
SE	(Colombia) A González	2	6	6
Q	(Italy) Antonio Comporto	6	3	2
(Russia) T Gabashvili	6	4	4
(Italy) M Viola	2	6	6
Q	(Argentina) Nicolás Pastor	2	0
7	(Brazil) R Dutra da Silva	6	6
4	(Slovenia) B Kavčič	4	6	6
(Spain) D Muñoz de la Nava	6	1	4
Q	(Serbia) B Pašanski	6^{5}	6	3
WC	(Italy) A Arnaboldi	7^{7}	4	0^{r}
(Brazil) T Alves	5	6	6
(Argentina) G Pella	7	1	1
Q	(Italy) W Trusendi	3	3
6	(Croatia) A Veić	6	6

Second round
1	(Spain) A Montañés	7	6
SE	(Colombia) A González	5	3
(Italy) M Viola	7	2	7^{9}
7	(Brazil) R Dutra da Silva	5	6	6^{7}
4	(Slovenia) B Kavčič	3	6	6
Q	(Serbia) B Pašanski	6	3	4
(Brazil) T Alves	1	5
6	(Croatia) A Veić	6	7

Quarterfinals
1	(Spain) A Montañés	6	6
(Italy) M Viola	2	4
4	(Slovenia) B Kavčič	2	7	6
6	(Croatia) A Veić	6	6^{3}	3

Semifinals
1	(Spain) A Montañés	w/o
4	(Slovenia) B Kavčič

=== Bottom half ===
First round
8	(Spain) D Gimeno Traver	4	7	6
WC	(Italy) Edoardo Eremin	6	5	3
(United States) W Odesnik	6	6
(Brazil) J Silva	4	3
(Argentina) D Junqueira	7^{7}	2	2
(Kazakhstan) A Golubev	6^{2}	6	6
(Netherlands) T Schoorel	6^{8}	4
3	(Italy) P Starace	7^{10}	6
6	(Germany) M Berrer	4	1	r
(Argentina) M González	6	1
(France) S Robert	3	4
(Argentina) M Alund	6	6
(Spain) I Cervantes	3	6^{5}
(France) F Serra	6	7^{7}
(Spain) J Martí	6	0	4
2/WC	(Italy) F Volandri	4	6	6

Second round
8	(Spain) D Gimeno Traver	4	7^{11}	6
(United States) W Odesnik	6	6^{9}	4
(Kazakhstan) A Golubev	6^{1}	5
3	(Italy) P Starace	7^{7}	7
(Argentina) M González	7^{8}	6
(Argentina) M Alund	6^{6}	1
(France) F Serra	3	3
2/WC	(Italy) F Volandri	6	6

Quarterfinals
8	(Spain) D Gimeno Traver	6	6
3	(Italy) P Starace	4	4
(Argentina) M González	6	6
2/WC	(Italy) F Volandri	4	2

Semifinals
8	(Spain) D Gimeno Traver	7	6
(Argentina) M González	5	3
