= 2011 Torneo Omnia Tenis Ciudad Madrid =

- Date: 26 September–2 October
- Edition: 1st
- Location: Madrid, Spain

Champions

Singles
- (France) Jérémy Chardy

Doubles
- (Spain) David Marrero / (Spain) Rubén Ramírez Hidalgo
- Torneo Omnia Tenis Ciudad Madrid

The 2011 Torneo Omnia Tenis Ciudad Madrid was a professional tennis tournament played on clay courts. It was the first edition of the tournament which was part of the 2011 ATP Challenger Tour. It took place in Madrid, Spain between 26 September and 2 October 2011.

== ATP entrants ==
=== Seeds ===
Country	Player	Rank^{1}	Seed
POR	Rui Machado	61	1
ESP	Pere Riba	72	2
ESP	Daniel Gimeno Traver	90	3
FRA	Éric Prodon	93	4
FRA	Jérémy Chardy	106	5
ITA	Paolo Lorenzi	124	6
ESP	Rubén Ramírez Hidalgo	141	7
RUS	Evgeny Donskoy	145	8

- ^{1} Rankings are as of September 19, 2011.

=== Other entrants ===
The following players received wildcards into the singles main draw:

- (Spain) Iván Arenas-Gualda
- (Spain) Javier Baños Pantoja
- (Austria) Thomas Muster
- (Spain) Roberto Ortega-Olmedo

The following players received entry as a special exempt into the singles main draw:

- (Spain) Iñigo Cervantes-Huegun

The following players received entry from the qualifying draw:

- (France) Romain Jouan
- (United Kingdom) Morgan Phillips
- (Germany) Jan-Lennard Struff
- (Germany) Peter Torebko

The following players received entry as a lucky loser into the singles main draw:

- (Russia) Ilya Belyaev

== Champions ==
=== Singles ===
(France) Jérémy Chardy def. (Spain) Daniel Gimeno Traver, 6–1, 5–7, 7–6^{(7–3)}

=== Doubles ===
(Spain) David Marrero / (Spain) Rubén Ramírez Hidalgo def. (Spain) Daniel Gimeno Traver / (United Kingdom) Morgan Phillips, 6–4, 6–7^{(8–10)}, [11–9]
