= 2009 Mitsubishi Electric Europe Cup =

- Date: April 6 – April 12
- Edition: 5th
- Location: Monza, Italy

Champions

Singles
- (Spain) David Marrero

Doubles
- (United Kingdom) James Auckland / (United States) Travis Rettenmaier
| ← 2008 · | Mitsubishi Electric Europe Cup | · 2010 → |

The 2009 Mitsubishi Electric Europe Cup was a professional tennis tournament played on outdoor red clay courts. It was part of the 2009 ATP Challenger Tour. It took place in Monza, Italy between 6 and 12 April 2009.

== Singles entrants ==
=== Seeds ===
| Nationality | Player | Ranking* | Seeding |
|---|---|---|---|
| GER | Simon Greul | 113 | 1 |
| FRA | Adrian Mannarino | 135 | 2 |
| FRA | Mathieu Montcourt | 136 | 3 |
| ITA | Filippo Volandri | 140 | 4 |
| ITA | Tomas Tenconi | 159 | 5 |
| ARG | Sebastián Decoud | 176 | 6 |
| SLO | Grega Žemlja | 177 | 7 |
| DEN | Kristian Pless | 181 | 8 |

- Rankings are as of March 23, 2009.

=== Other entrants ===
The following players received wildcards into the singles main draw:

- (Italy) Andrea Arnaboldi
- (Italy) Stefano Ianni
- (Serbia) Dejan Katić
- (Italy) Filippo Volandri

The following players received entry from the qualifying draw:

- (Italy) Alberto Brizzi
- (Spain) Albert Ramos-Viñolas
- (Brazil) Daniel Silva
- (Czech Republic) Robin Vik
- (Spain) Iñigo Cervantes-Huegun (as a Lucky loser)

== Champions ==
=== Men's singles ===
(Spain) David Marrero def. (Croatia) Antonio Veić, 5–7, 6–4, 6–4

=== Men's doubles ===
(United Kingdom) James Auckland / (United States) Travis Rettenmaier def. (Czech Republic) Dušan Karol / (Czech Republic) Jaroslav Pospíšil, 7–5, 6–7(6), [10–4]
