= Daniel Brands =

German tennis player (born 1987)

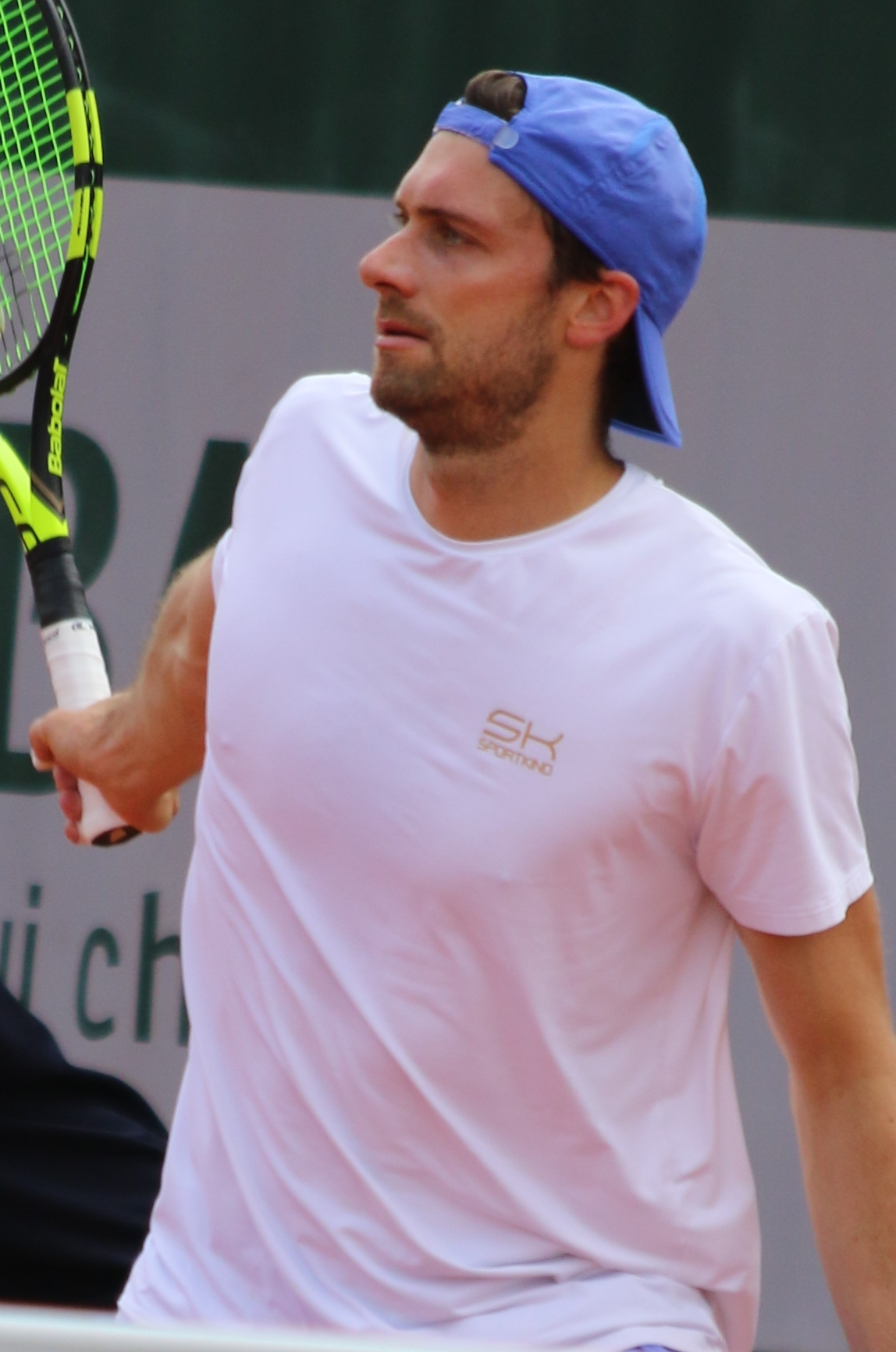
- Brands at the 2019 French Open
- Full name: Daniel Fabian Brands
- Country (sports): Germany
- Residence: Deggendorf, Germany
- Born: 17 July 1987 (age 39) Deggendorf, West Germany
- Height: 1.96 m (6 ft 5 in)
- Turned pro: 2005
- Retired: 2019
- Plays: Right-handed (one-handed backhand)
- Prize money: $2,181,301

Singles
- Career record: 60–93
- Career titles: 0
- Highest ranking: No. 51 (19 August 2013)

Grand Slam singles results
- Australian Open: 2R (2013, 2016)
- French Open: 1R (2008, 2009, 2010, 2011, 2013, 2014)
- Wimbledon: 4R (2010)
- US Open: 2R (2012)

Doubles
- Career record: 9–25
- Career titles: 0
- Highest ranking: No. 154 (19 May 2008)

Grand Slam doubles results
- Australian Open: 1R (2014)
- French Open: 1R (2013)
- Wimbledon: 2R (2013)
- US Open: 2R (2013)

Daniel Brands (born 17 July 1987) is a German retired professional tennis player. His career-high singles ranking was world No. 51 achieved on 19 August 2013.

== Professional career ==
=== 2008 ===
Brands began 2008 ranked No. 220. After a few unimpressive tournaments to start the year, he beat no. 132 Aisam Qureshi and no. 193 Simon Stadler en route to a semifinal Challenger finish in Germany in February. In March, he made the quarters of a Challenger in Japan before losing to no. 124 Yen-Hsun Lu, then reached the quarters of a Challenger in Sarajevo, beating no. 169 Matthias Bachinger.

In May, Brands reached the quarterfinals at two more Challengers, beating no. 66 Michael Berrer and no. 114 Brian Dabul, while also winning the doubles title in one and reaching the doubles final in the other. Then, with his ranking at a career-high of no. 210, he beat no. 123 Nicolás Massú, no. 151 Pablo Andújar (who beat him a week earlier), and no. 198 Alex Bogomolov to qualify into the main draw of the 2008 French Open.

=== 2009 ===
Brands made it to the semifinals of the 2009 BMW Open, before losing to Mikhail Youzhny. He lost in the first round of the 2009 French Open to Robert Kendrick.

=== 2010 ===
Brands again bowed out in the first round of the [2010 French Open], but he put up a great performance only to fall short against the eighth seed Frenchman and world no. 10 Jo-Wilfried Tsonga.

Brands made his Wimbledon debut at the 2010 tournament, defeating Igor Andreev in the first round. He continued his run in the second round by upsetting world no. 5 and seventh seed Nikolay Davydenko, who was returning from injury. Brands then saved four match points at two sets to love down against Victor Hănescu, to win while leading the fifth set when Hanescu retired due to injury, and a controversial issue with the crowd. In the fourth round, Brands lost to eventual finalist Tomáš Berdych.

At the 2010 US Open tournament Brands was defeated by countryman Benjamin Becker in the first round in straight sets. He then accepted a Wildcard for an ATP Challenger Tour event in Braşov, Romania where he bowed out in the first round. The Open de Moselle in Metz was his next tournament. He fell to Tommy Robredo in the first round.

He reached his first quarterfinal of the season at the Thailand Open in Bangkok defeating Illya Marchenko and Thiemo de Bakker, where he saved a matchpoint. He was again knocked out by Benjamin Becker.

=== 2012 ===
Brands lost to Marin Čilić in the Croatia Open.

=== 2013 ===
Brands entered the Australian Open beating 27th seed Martin Klizan before losing to an in-form Bernard Tomic. In the French Open he drew Rafael Nadal in the first round. He shocked Rafa, winning the opening set 6–4 with a punishing serve and huge flat groundstrokes, reminiscent of both Söderling and Rosol, who upset Rafa in the French Open and Wimbledon, respectively. Brands went ahead in the second set tie breaker 3–0, but his level slightly dropped and Nadal's rose. After pulling Nadal off the court with a second serve at 3–2, Brands missed a backhand into the open court that provided the break that Nadal needed to climb back in and win the tiebreaker, 7–4. Brands let down slightly in the next game and was broken for the first time in the match. Nadal upped his game and won the next two sets 6–4 and 6–3. Nadal was quoted by the New York Times as saying, "I don’t know what he's ranked, but he can’t be ranked 60th playing like that. I can’t believe it".

== ATP Challenger Tour finals ==
=== Singles: 13 (7–6) ===
Result	W–L	Date	Tournament	Surface	Opponent	Score
Loss	0–1	Mar 2007	Wolfsburg, Germany	Carpet (i)	(Netherlands) Robin Haase	2–6, 6–3, 1–6
Loss	0–2	Jun 2007	Almaty, Kazakhstan	Clay	(Germany) Simon Greul	4–6, 2–6
Win	1–2	Aug 2008	Timişoara, Romania	Clay	(Spain) Daniel Muñoz de la Nava	6–4, 7–6^{(7–0)}
Win	2–2	Nov 2009	Eckental, Germany	Carpet (i)	(Jamaica) Dustin Brown	6–4, 6–4
Win	3–2	Apr 2010	Monza, Italy	Clay	(Spain) Pablo Andújar	6–7^{(4–7)}, 6–3, 6–4
Loss	3–3	May 2010	Tunis, Tunisia	Clay	(Argentina) José Acasuso	3–6, 4–6
Loss	3–4	Jan 2011	Heilbronn, Germany	Hard (i)	(Germany) Bastian Knittel	6–7^{(4–7)}, 6–7^{(5–7)}
Win	4–4	Jul 2011	Oberstaufen, Germany	Clay	(Germany) Andreas Beck	6–4, 7–6^{(7–3)}
Win	5–4	Nov 2011	Helsinki, Finland	Hard	(Germany) Matthias Bachinger	7–6^{(7–2)}, 7–6^{(7–5)}
Win	6–4	Nov 2012	Eckental, Germany (2)	Carpet (i)	(Latvia) Ernests Gulbis	7–6^{(7–0)}, 6–3
Loss	6–5	Sep 2015	Como, Italy	Clay	(Russia) Andrey Kuznetsov	4–6, 3–6
Win	7–5	Jul 2018	Recanati, Italy	Hard	(Spain) Adrián Menéndez Maceiras	7–5, 6–3
Loss	7–6	Jul 2018	Astana, Kazakhstan	Hard	(Austria) Sebastian Ofner	6–7^{(5–7)}, 3–6

=== Doubles: 5 (3–2) ===
Result	W–L	Date	Tournament	Surface	Partner	Opponents	Score
Win	1–0	May 2007	Fergana, Uzbekistan	Hard	(United States) John Paul Fruttero	(Czech Republic) Lukáš Rosol (Austria) Martin Slanar	7–6^{(7–1)}, 7–5
Win	2–0	Jun 2007	Astana, Kazakhstan	Hard	(Australia) Adam Feeney	(Slovakia) Kamil Čapkovič (Croatia) Ivan Dodig	6–2, 6–4
Win	3–0	May 2008	Dresden, Germany	Clay	(South Korea) Jun Woong-sun	(Serbia) Ilija Bozoljac (Serbia) Dušan Vemić	2–6, 7–6^{(7–4)}, [10–6]
Loss	3–1	May 2008	San Remo, Italy	Clay	(Germany) Matthias Bachinger	(Israel) Harel Levy (United States) Jim Thomas	4–6, 4–6
Loss	3–2	Oct 2015	Sacramento, United States	Carpet	(Germany) Dustin Brown	(Slovenia) Blaž Kavčič (Slovenia) Grega Žemlja	1–6, 6–3, [3–10]

== Performance timelines ==
Key
W	F	SF	QF	#R	RR	Q#	DNQ	A	NH

(W) winner; (F) finalist; (SF) semifinalist; (QF) quarterfinalist; (#R) rounds 4, 3, 2, 1; (RR) round-robin stage; (Q#) qualification round; (DNQ) did not qualify; (A) absent; (NH) not held; (SR) strike rate (events won / competed); (W–L) win–loss record.

=== Singles ===
Tournament	2005	2006	2007	2008	2009	2010	2011	2012	2013	2014	2015	2016	2017	2018	2019	SR	W–L
Grand Slam tournaments
Australian Open	A	A	A	Q1	Q2	1R	1R	Q1	2R	1R	A	2R	Q1	A	Q1	0 / 5	2–5
French Open	A	A	A	1R	1R	1R	1R	Q3	1R	1R	A	Q3	Q1	A	Q1	0 / 6	0–6
Wimbledon	A	A	A	Q2	Q2	4R	Q1	Q1	2R	Q3	A	Q3	1R	A	Q3	0 / 3	4–3
US Open	A	A	A	Q1	Q2	1R	A	2R	1R	A	A	1R	Q1	Q2	A	0 / 4	1–4
Win–loss	0–0	0–0	0–0	0–1	0–1	3–4	0–2	1–1	2–4	0–2	0–0	1–2	0–1	0–0	0–0	0 / 18	7–18
ATP World Tour Masters 1000
Indian Wells Masters	A	A	A	A	A	Q2	Q2	A	2R	1R	A	Q1	A	A	A	0 / 2	1–2
Miami Open	A	A	A	A	A	A	1R	A	1R	1R	A	Q1	A	A	A	0 / 3	0–3
Monte-Carlo Masters	A	A	A	A	A	A	A	A	1R	A	A	Q1	A	A	A	0 / 1	0–1
Shanghai Masters	Not Held				A	A	A	A	2R	A	A	A	A	A	A	0 / 1	1–1
Win–loss	0–0	0–0	0–0	0–0	0–0	0–0	0–1	0–0	2–4	0–2	0–0	0–0	0–0	0–0	0–0	0 / 7	2–7
National representation
Davis Cup	A	A	A	A	A	A	A	A	PO	QF	A	PO	A	A	A	0 / 1	2–0
Career statistics
Tournaments	0	0	1	4	5	19	11	8	23	11	1	4	4	1	1	93	
Overall win–loss	0–0	0–0	1–1	1–4	7–5	9–19	4–11	5–8	24–23	3–11	2–1	2–4	1–4	0–1	1–1	60–93	
Win %	–	–	50%	20%	58%	32%	27%	38%	51%	21%	67%	33%	20%	0%	50%	39%	
Year-end ranking	701	526	220	150	92	104	110	153	54	329	159	168	320	182			

=== Doubles ===
Tournament	2010	2011	2012	2013	2014	SR	W–L
Grand Slam tournaments
Australian Open	A	A	A	A	1R	0 / 1	0–1
French Open	A	A	A	1R	A	0 / 1	0–1
Wimbledon	A	A	Q1	2R	A	0 / 1	1–1
US Open	1R	A	A	2R	A	0 / 2	1–2
Win–loss	0–1	0–0	0–0	2–3	0–1	0 / 5	2–5

== Record against top-10 players ==
Brands' match record against players who have been ranked world No. 10 or higher is as follows. Only ATP Tour main draw results are considered. Players who have been No. 1 are in boldface.

- (France) Gaël Monfils 3–2
- (Russia) Nikolay Davydenko 2–1
- (Spain) Roberto Bautista Agut 1–0
- (Spain) David Ferrer 1–0
- (France) Sébastien Grosjean 1–0
- (Serbia) Janko Tipsarević 1–0
- (Cyprus) Marcos Baghdatis 1–1
- (Switzerland) **Roger Federer** 1–1
- (Czech Republic) Radek Štěpánek 1–1
- (Russia) Mikhail Youzhny 1–2
- (France) Gilles Simon 1–3
- (South Africa) Kevin Anderson 0–1
- (Latvia) Ernests Gulbis 0–1
- (Germany) Tommy Haas 0–1
- (Croatia) Ivan Ljubičić 0–1
- (Austria) Jürgen Melzer 0–1
- (Spain) **Rafael Nadal** 0–1
- (United Kingdom) Cameron Norrie 0–1
- (Spain) Tommy Robredo 0–1
- (Germany) Alexander Zverev 0–1
- (Czechoslovakia) Tomáš Berdych 0–2
- (Argentina) Juan Martín del Potro 0–2
- (France) Richard Gasquet 0–2
- (Croatia) Marin Čilić 0–3
- (France) Jo-Wilfried Tsonga 0–3

* As of 4 April 2022.

=== Wins over top-10 players ===
Season	2007	2008	2009	2010	2011	2012	2013	2014	2015	2016	2017	2018	2019	**Total**
Wins	0	0	1	1	0	0	2	1	0	0	0	0	0	**5**

#	Player	Rank	Event	Surface	Rd	Score	DB Rank
**2009**
1.	(France) Gilles Simon	7	Hamburg, Germany	Clay	2R	3–6, 6–4, 6–3	120
**2010**
2.	(Russia) Nikolay Davydenko	5	Wimbledon, London, United Kingdom	Grass	2R	1–6, 7–6^{(7–5)}, 7–6^{(10–8)}, 6–1	98
**2013**
3.	(Serbia) Janko Tipsarević	10	Munich, Germany	Clay	QF	6–3, 4–6, 6–4	69
4.	(Switzerland) Roger Federer	5	Gstaad, Switzerland	Clay	2R	6–3, 6–4	55
**2014**
5.	(Spain) David Ferrer	3	Doha, Qatar	Hard	2R	6–4, 7–5	54
