= Torneo Omnia Tenis Ciudad Madrid =

Defunct tennis tournament
- Location: Madrid; Spain
- Category: ATP Challenger Tour
- Surface: Clay / Outdoors
- Draw: 32S/32Q/16D
- Prize money: €42,500

The Torneo Omnia Tenis Ciudad Madrid was a tennis tournament held in Madrid, Spain. The combined event was part of the ATP Challenger Tour in 2011, 2012 and also part of the ITF Women's Circuit in 2011. It was played on outdoor clay courts.

== Past finals ==
=== Singles ===
Year	Champion	Runner-up	Score	Ref.
2011	(France) Jérémy Chardy	(Spain) Daniel Gimeno-Traver	6–1, 5–7, 7–6^{(7–3)}	
2012	(Spain) Daniel Gimeno-Traver	(Germany) Jan-Lennard Struff	6–4, 6–2	

=== Doubles ===
Year	Champions	Runners-up	Score	Ref.
2011	(Spain) David Marrero (Spain) Rubén Ramírez Hidalgo	(Spain) Daniel Gimeno-Traver (United Kingdom) Morgan Phillips	6–4, 6–7^{(8–10)}, [11–9]	
2012	(Spain) Daniel Gimeno-Traver (Spain) Iván Navarro	(Australia) Colin Ebelthite (Czech Republic) Jaroslav Pospíšil	6–2, 4–6, [10–7]	
