= Fabio Colangelo =

Italian tennis player

- Country (sports): Italy
- Born: 25 August 1981 (age 43)
- Plays: Right-handed
- Prize money: $85,821

Singles
- Career record: 0–0 (at ATP Tour level, Grand Slam level, and in Davis Cup)
- Career titles: 0
- Highest ranking: No. 415 (26 June 2006)

Doubles
- Career record: 0–3 (at ATP Tour level, Grand Slam level, and in Davis Cup)
- Career titles: 0; 4 Challengers, 32 Futures
- Highest ranking: No. 154 (9 June 2008)
- Last updated on: 19 June 2017.

Fabio Colangelo (born 25 August 1981) is a retired Italian tennis player.

Colangelo has a career high ATP singles ranking of 415 achieved on 26 June 2006. He also has a career high ATP doubles ranking of 154 achieved on 9 June 2008.

Colangelo has three ATP main draw appearances, all in doubles, as well as four Challenger titles.

Colangelo then became the new coach of Lorenzo Sonego, n.57 in the World Ranking, from Monday 8 April 2024 after the farewell of his old coach Gipo Arbino.
