= David Marrero =

Spanish tennis player (born 1980)

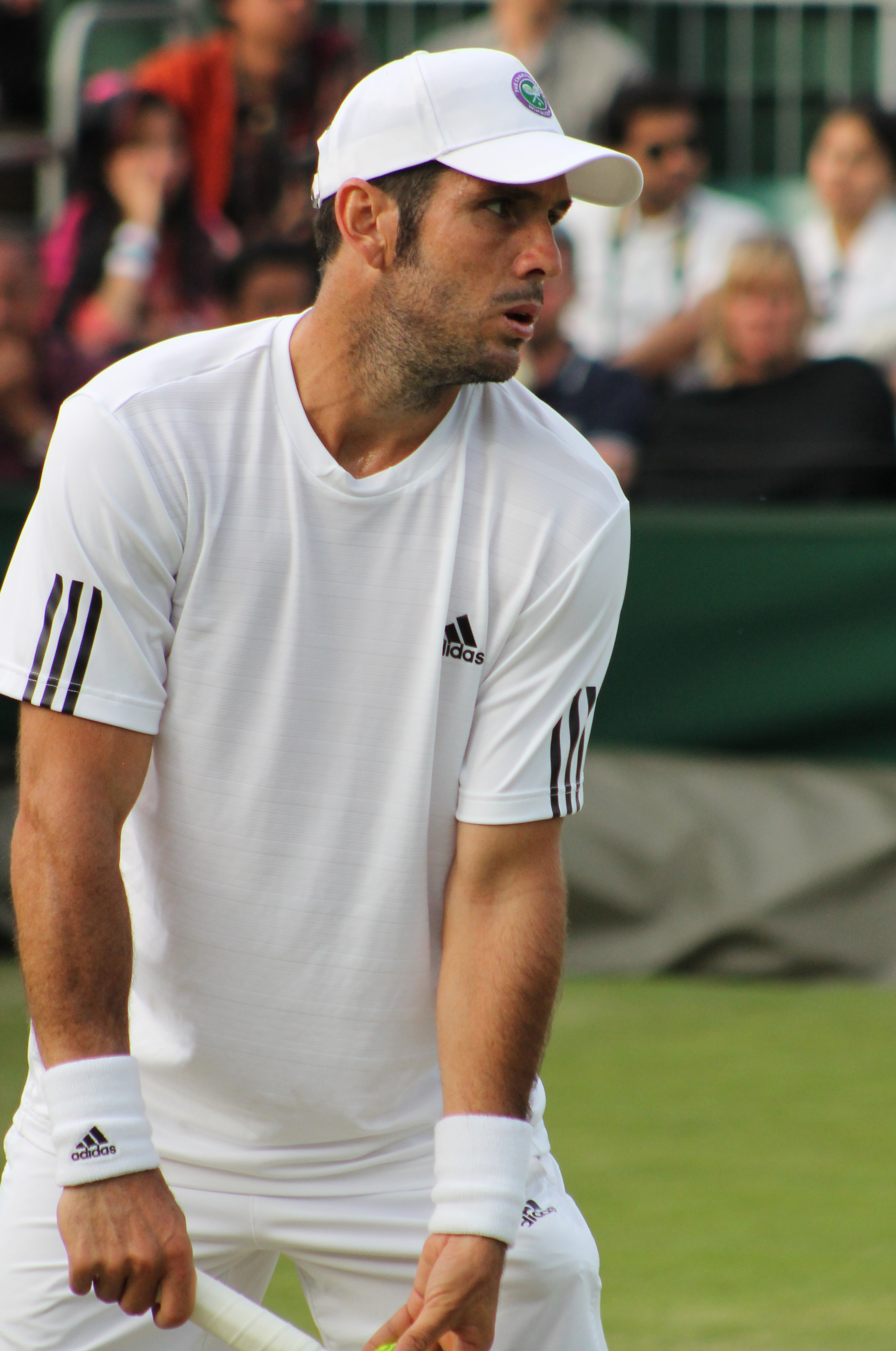
- Country (sports): Spain
- Residence: Alicante, Spain
- Born: 8 April 1980 (age 46) Las Palmas de Gran Canaria, Spain
- Height: 1.83 m (6 ft 0 in)
- Turned pro: 2001
- Retired: August 2025 (last match played)
- Plays: Right-handed (one-handed backhand)
- Prize money: US $2,391,669

Singles
- Career record: 3–6
- Career titles: 0
- Highest ranking: No. 143 (8 February 2010)

Grand Slam singles results
- French Open: 2R (2008)
- Wimbledon: Q2 (2008)
- US Open: Q1 (2008, 2010)

Doubles
- Career record: 247–216
- Career titles: 14
- Highest ranking: No. 5 (11 November 2013)

Grand Slam doubles results
- Australian Open: QF (2013, 2015)
- French Open: QF (2013)
- Wimbledon: 3R (2012, 2014)
- US Open: QF (2011, 2014)

Other doubles tournaments
- Tour Finals: W (2013)

Grand Slam mixed doubles results
- Australian Open: QF (2013)
- French Open: 1R (2012, 2013, 2014)
- Wimbledon: 3R (2013)
- US Open: QF (2012)

Team competitions
- Davis Cup: 0–3

David Marrero Santana (Spanish pronunciation: [daˈβið maˈreɾo sanˈtana]; born 8 April 1980) is a Spanish former professional tennis player. He has a career-high ATP singles ranking of No. 143 achieved on 8 February 2010 and a doubles ranking of world No. 5 on 11 November 2013. Marrero won 14 doubles titles

== Professional career ==
=== 2000–2007 ===
Marrero earned his first world ranking late in 2000 as a 20-year-old, but he spent only a few weeks inside the top-500 until early 2005. By late 2005, he had made it into the top-300, but faded over the next year to close out 2006 outside the top-400. In the middle of 2007, he again inched into the top-300, but faded again to close out 2007 at No. 362.

=== 2008: Maiden Challenger singles final ===
As a qualifier, Marrero reached the final of a Challenger in Chile in January, losing to No. 132 Rubén Ramírez Hidalgo after upsetting No. 272 Sebastián Decoud, No. 187 Adrián García and No. 111 Nicolás Lapentti. This result brought him back into the top 300 at World No. 289. The very next week he gained revenge over Ramirez-Hidalgo to qualify into an ATP stop in Chile, where he again beat García before losing to No. 104 Fabio Fognini in the second round. In February, Marrero scored another upset, defeating World No. 114 Máximo González.

=== 2009–2013: ATP Tour Finals, World No. 5 in doubles ===
Marrero reached his career-high singles ranking of World No. 143 on 8 February 2010 and career-high ranking of World No. 5 in doubles on 11 November 2013 after winning the ATP World Tour Finals with Fernando Verdasco defeating the Bryan brothers.

=== 2022–2025: Retirement, Continued Challenger/ITF play ===
Marrero announced his retirement at the 2022 Barcelona Open Banc Sabadell, but continued to play on the Challenger and ITF circuits.

In October 2024, he won an ITF doubles tournament playing with Sergi Fita Juan.

== Match fixing controversy ==
In January 2016, Marrero was featured in a New York Times article about his suspected match-fixing at the Australian Open.

== ITIA 31-month tour ban ==
In November 2025, it was announced that Marrero was given a 31-month ban by the International Tennis Integrity Association (ITIA) that started on 21 October 2025 and would finish on 20 May 2028 after accepting sanctions for violating the Tennis Anti-Corruption Program wildcard rules. He admitted to four instances between 2022-23 of paying and offering to pay for wildcards for himself and/or a doubles partner.

== Significant finals ==
=== Year-end championships finals ===
==== Doubles: 1 (1 title) ====
| Result | Year | Tournament | Surface | Partner | Opponents | Score |
|---|---|---|---|---|---|---|
| Win | 2013 | London | Hard (i) | (Spain) Fernando Verdasco | (United States) Bob Bryan (United States) Mike Bryan | 7–5, 6–7^{(3–7)}, [10–7] |

=== Masters 1000 finals ===
==== Doubles: 2 (1 title, 1 runner-up) ====
| Result | Year | Tournament | Surface | Partner | Opponents | Score |
|---|---|---|---|---|---|---|
| Loss | 2013 | Shanghai | Hard | (Spain) Fernando Verdasco | (Croatia) Ivan Dodig (Brazil) Marcelo Melo | 6–7^{(2–7)}, 7–6^{(8–6)}, [2–10] |
| Win | 2015 | Rome | Clay | (Uruguay) Pablo Cuevas | (Spain) Marcel Granollers (Spain) Marc López | 6–4, 7–5 |

== ATP career finals ==
=== Doubles: 30 (14 titles, 16 runner-ups) ===
| Legend Grand Slam tournaments (0–0) ATP World Tour Finals (1–0) ATP World Tour Masters 1000 (1–1) ATP World Tour 500 Series (4–3) ATP World Tour 250 Series (8–12) | Titles by surface Hard (2–3) Clay (12–12) Grass (0–1) | Titles by setting Outdoor (12–14) Indoor (2–2) |

| Result | W–L | Date | Tournament | Tier | Surface | Partner | Opponents | Score |
|---|---|---|---|---|---|---|---|---|
| Win | 1–0 | May 2010 | Estoril Open, Portugal | 250 Series | Clay | (Spain) Marc López | (Uruguay) Pablo Cuevas (Spain) Marcel Granollers | 6–7^{(1–7)}, 6–4, [10–4] |
| Win | 2–0 | Jul 2010 | German Open, Germany | 500 Series | Clay | (Spain) Marc López | (France) Jérémy Chardy (France) Paul-Henri Mathieu | 6–3, 2–6, [10–8] |
| Loss | 2–1 | May 2011 | Estoril Open, Portugal | 250 Series | Clay | (Spain) Marc López | (United States) Eric Butorac (Curaçao) Jean-Julien Rojer | 3–6, 4–6 |
| Loss | 2–2 | May 2011 | Open de Nice Côte d'Azur, France | 250 Series | Clay | (Mexico) Santiago González | (United States) Eric Butorac (Curaçao) Jean-Julien Rojer | 3–6, 4–6 |
| Loss | 2–3 | Sep 2011 | Romanian Open, Romania | 250 Series | Clay | (Austria) Julian Knowle | (Italy) Daniele Bracciali (Italy) Potito Starace | 6–3, 4–6, [8–10] |
| Loss | 2–4 | Oct 2011 | Kremlin Cup, Russia | 250 Series | Hard (i) | (Argentina) Carlos Berlocq | (Czech Republic) František Čermák (Slovakia) Filip Polášek | 3–6, 1–6 |
| Win | 3–4 | Feb 2012 | Argentina Open, Argentina | 250 Series | Clay | (Spain) Fernando Verdasco | (Slovakia) Michal Mertiňák (Brazil) André Sá | 4–6, 4–6 |
| Win | 4–4 | Feb 2012 | Mexican Open, Mexico | 500 Series | Clay | (Spain) Fernando Verdasco | (Spain) Marcel Granollers (Spain) Marc López | 6–3, 6–4 |
| Loss | 4–5 | May 2012 | Estoril Open, Portugal | 250 Series | Clay | (Austria) Julian Knowle | (Pakistan) Aisam-ul-Haq Qureshi (Netherlands) Jean-Julien Rojer | 5–7, 5–7 |
| Win | 5–5 | Jul 2012 | Croatia Open, Croatia | 250 Series | Clay | (Spain) Fernando Verdasco | (Spain) Marcel Granollers (Spain) Marc López | 6–3, 7–6^{(7–4)} |
| Win | 6–5 | Jul 2012 | German Open, Germany (2) | 500 Series | Clay | (Spain) Fernando Verdasco | (Brazil) Rogério Dutra Silva (Spain) Daniel Muñoz de la Nava | 6–4, 6–3 |
| Loss | 6–6 | Oct 2012 | Valencia Open, Spain | 500 Series | Hard (i) | (Spain) Fernando Verdasco | (Austria) Alexander Peya (Brazil) Bruno Soares | 3–6, 2–6 |
| Win | 7–6 | Mar 2013 | Mexican Open, Mexico (2) | 500 Series | Clay | (Poland) Łukasz Kubot | (Italy) Simone Bolelli (Italy) Fabio Fognini | 7–5, 6–2 |
| Win | 8–6 | Jul 2013 | Croatia Open, Croatia (2) | 250 Series | Clay | (Slovakia) Martin Kližan | (United States) Nicholas Monroe (Germany) Simon Stadler | 6–1, 5–7, [10–7] |
| Win | 9–6 | Sep 2013 | St. Petersburg Open, Russia | 250 Series | Hard (i) | (Spain) Fernando Verdasco | (United Kingdom) Dominic Inglot (Uzbekistan) Denis Istomin | 7–6^{(8–6)}, 6–3 |
| Loss | 9–7 | Oct 2013 | Shanghai Masters, China | Masters 1000 | Hard | (Spain) Fernando Verdasco | (Croatia) Ivan Dodig (Brazil) Marcelo Melo | 6–7^{(2–7)}, 7–6^{(8–6)}, [2–10] |
| Win | 10–7 | Nov 2013 | ATP World Tour Finals, United Kingdom | Tour Finals | Hard (i) | (Spain) Fernando Verdasco | (United States) Bob Bryan (United States) Mike Bryan | 7–5, 6–7^{(3–7)}, [10–7] |
| Loss | 10–8 | Feb 2014 | Rio Open, Brazil | 500 Series | Clay | (Brazil) Marcelo Melo | (Colombia) Juan Sebastián Cabal (Colombia) Robert Farah | 4–6, 2–6 |
| Loss | 10–9 | Apr 2014 | U.S. Men's Clay Court Championships, United States | 250 Series | Clay | (Spain) Fernando Verdasco | (United States) Bob Bryan (United States) Mike Bryan | 6–4, 4–6, [9–11] |
| Loss | 10–10 | May 2014 | Portugal Open, Portugal | 250 Series | Clay | (Uruguay) Pablo Cuevas | (Mexico) Santiago González (United States) Scott Lipsky | 3–6, 6–3, [8–10] |
| Loss | 10–11 | May 2015 | Estoril Open, Portugal | 250 Series | Clay | (Spain) Marc López | (Philippines) Treat Huey (United States) Scott Lipsky | 1–6, 4–6 |
| Win | 11–11 | May 2015 | Italian Open, Italy | Masters 1000 | Clay | (Uruguay) Pablo Cuevas | (Spain) Marcel Granollers (Spain) Marc López | 6–4, 7–5 |
| Loss | 11–12 | Jun 2015 | Nottingham Open, United Kingdom | 250 Series | Grass | (Uruguay) Pablo Cuevas | (Australia) Chris Guccione (Brazil) André Sá | 2–6, 5–7 |
| Loss | 11–13 | Feb 2016 | Rio Open, Brazil | 500 Series | Clay | (Spain) Pablo Carreño Busta | (Colombia) Juan Sebastián Cabal (Colombia) Robert Farah | 6–7^{(5–7)}, 1–6 |
| Loss | 11–14 | Feb 2016 | Brasil Open, Brazil | 250 Series | Clay | (Spain) Pablo Carreño Busta | (Chile) Julio Peralta (Argentina) Horacio Zeballos | 6–4, 1–6, [5–10] |
| Win | 12–14 | Jul 2016 | Swedish Open, Sweden | 250 Series | Clay | (Spain) Marcel Granollers | (New Zealand) Marcus Daniell (Brazil) Marcelo Demoliner | 6–2, 6–3 |
| Win | 13–14 | Jul 2016 | Croatia Open, Croatia (3) | 250 Series | Clay | (Slovakia) Martin Kližan | (Croatia) Nikola Mektić (Croatia) Antonio Šančić | 6–4, 6–2 |
| Loss | 13–15 | Feb 2017 | Argentina Open, Argentina | 250 Series | Clay | (Mexico) Santiago González | (Colombia) Juan Sebastián Cabal (Colombia) Robert Farah | 1–6, 4–6 |
| Loss | 13–16 | May 2017 | Estoril Open, Portugal | 250 Series | Clay | (Spain) Tommy Robredo | (United States) Ryan Harrison (New Zealand) Michael Venus | 5–7, 2–6 |
| Win | 14–16 | Feb 2018 | Rio Open, Brazil | 500 Series | Clay | (Spain) Fernando Verdasco | (Croatia) Nikola Mektić (Austria) Alexander Peya | 5–7, 7–5, [10–8] |

== ATP Challenger and ITF Futures finals ==
=== Singles: 16 (8–8) ===
| Legend (singles) ATP Challenger Tour (1–2) ITF Futures Tour (7–6) | Titles by surface Hard (1–2) Clay (7–6) |

| Result | W–L | Date | Tournament | Tier | Surface | Opponent | Score |
|---|---|---|---|---|---|---|---|
| Loss | 0–1 | Nov 2002 | France F22, Rodez | Futures | Hard (i) | (France) Jérôme Hanquez | 3–6, 4–6 |
| Win | 1–1 | Apr 2003 | Chile F3, Santiago | Futures | Clay | (Chile) Paul Capdeville | 3–6, 6–3, 6–4 |
| Loss | 1–2 | Aug 2004 | Spain F20, Santander | Futures | Clay | (Spain) Mariano Albert-Ferrando | 3–6, 6–3, 6–7^{(7–9)} |
| Win | 2–2 | May 2005 | Spain F5, Lleida | Futures | Clay | (Spain) Javier Genaro Martínez | 7–6^{(7–5)}, 7–6^{(8–6)} |
| Win | 3–2 | May 2005 | Spain F14, Alicante | Futures | Clay | (Spain) Bartolomé Salvá Vidal | 6–1, 4–6, 6–3 |
| Loss | 3–3 | Sep 2005 | Spain F25, Madrid | Futures | Hard | (Netherlands) Michel Koning | 6–4, 3–6, 2–6 |
| Win | 4–3 | Oct 2005 | Spain F27, El Ejido | Futures | Hard | (Netherlands) Jesse Huta Galung | 6–3, 6–4 |
| Loss | 4–4 | Feb 2006 | Spain F5, Murcia | Futures | Clay | (Spain) Pablo Santos González | 3–6, 0–3 ret. |
| Loss | 4–5 | Oct 2006 | Spain F32, El Ejido | Futures | Clay | (Croatia) Tomislav Perić | 3–6, 4–6 |
| Win | 5–5 | Feb 2007 | Spain F4, Murcia | Futures | Clay | (Spain) Gabriel Trujillo Soler | 6–2, 5–7, 6–2 |
| Loss | 5–6 | Mar 2007 | Spain F9, Sabadell | Futures | Clay | (Spain) Bartolomé Salvá Vidal | 2–6, 2–6 |
| Win | 6–6 | Apr 2007 | Spain F12, Zaragoza | Futures | Clay (i) | (Spain) Gabriel Trujillo Soler | 3–6, 6–4, 6–3 |
| Win | 7–6 | Jul 2007 | France F9, Toulon | Futures | Clay | (France) Alexandre Sidorenko | 6–4, 6–2 |
| Loss | 7–7 | Jan 2008 | La Serena, Chile | Challenger | Clay | (Spain) Rubén Ramírez Hidalgo | 3–6, 1–6 |
| Loss | 7–8 | Mar 2009 | Meknes, Morocco | Challenger | Clay | (Portugal) Rui Machado | 2–6, 7–6^{(8–6)}, 3–6 |
| Win | 8–8 | Apr 2009 | Monza, Italy | Challenger | Clay | (Croatia) Antonio Veić | 5–7, 6–4, 6–4 |

=== Doubles: 60 (34–27) ===
| Legend (doubles) ATP Challenger Tour (16–6) ITF Futures Tour (18–21) | Titles by surface Hard (4–1) Clay (30–26) |

| Result | W–L | Date | Tournament | Tier | Surface | Partner | Opponents | Score |
|---|---|---|---|---|---|---|---|---|
| Loss | 0–1 | Jul 2000 | France F15, Aix-les-Bains | Futures | Clay | (Spain) Sergi Durán Bernad | (Australia) Luke Bourgeois (Australia) Domenic Marafiote | 4–5^{(5–7)}, 2–4, 2–4 |
| Loss | 0–2 | Aug 2001 | Spain F5, Xàtiva | Futures | Clay | (Spain) Francesc Lleal Garrés | (Spain) Carlos Rexach Itoiz (Spain) Gabriel Trujillo Soler | 4–6, 6–7^{(3–7)} |
| Loss | 0–3 | Dec 2001 | Spain F16, Las Palmas | Futures | Clay | (Spain) Carlos Rexach Itoiz | (Japan) Jun Kato (Germany) Jan Weinzierl | 6–4, 2–6, 1–6 |
| Loss | 0–4 | Jun 2002 | Spain F2, Canarias | Futures | Clay | (Spain) Marc Fornell Mestres | (Spain) Jesús Manteca Jurado (Spain) Fernando Verdasco | 6–7^{(4–7)}, 2–6 |
| Loss | 0–5 | Sep 2002 | Poland F8, Warszawa | Futures | Clay | (Spain) Carlos Rexach Itoiz | (Poland) Marcin Gołąb (Poland) Kamil Lewandowicz | w/o |
| Loss | 0–6 | Dec 2002 | Spain F20, Gran Canaria | Futures | Clay | (Spain) Gabriel Rodríguez Ruano | (Spain) Iván Navarro (Spain) Santiago Ventura | 3–6, 2–1 ret. |
| Loss | 0–7 | Apr 2003 | Chile F3, Santiago | Futures | Clay | (Chile) Paul Capdeville | (Argentina) Francisco Cabello (Chile) Adrián García | 3–6, 1–6 |
| Loss | 0–8 | Feb 2004 | Spain F1, Murcia | Futures | Clay | (Spain) Germán Puentes Alcañiz | (Romania) Ionuț Moldovan (Romania) Gabriel Moraru | 4–6, 3–6 |
| Win | 1–8 | Apr 2004 | Italy F3, Cremona | Futures | Clay | (Spain) José Antonio Sánchez de Luna | (Italy) Fabio Colangelo (Italy) Alessandro Motti | 6–4, 7–5 |
| Loss | 1–9 | Aug 2004 | Spain F18, Vigo | Futures | Clay | (Spain) Carlos Rexach Itoiz | (Portugal) Rui Machado (Uruguay) Martín Vilarrubí | 6–2, 3–6, 3–6 |
| Loss | 1–10 | Aug 2004 | Spain F20, Santander | Futures | Clay | (Spain) Pablo Santos González | (Spain) Marcel Granollers (Ivory Coast) Valentin Sanon | w/o |
| Loss | 1–11 | Sep 2004 | Spain F21, Oviedo | Futures | Clay | (Spain) Héctor Ruiz-Cadenas | (Spain) Antonio Baldellou-Esteva (Spain) Germán Puentes Alcañiz | 4–6, 0–6 |
| Loss | 1–12 | Oct 2004 | Spain F28, Barcelona | Futures | Clay | (Spain) Gorka Fraile | (Spain) Marc Fornell Mestres (Spain) Mario Muñoz-Bejarano | 4–6, 6–4, 4–6 |
| Win | 2–12 | Oct 2004 | Spain F29, Vilafranca | Futures | Clay | (Spain) Gorka Fraile | (Spain) Antonio Baldellou-Esteva (Spain) Germán Puentes Alcañiz | 6–4, 7–6^{(7–1)} |
| Win | 3–12 | May 2005 | Spain F8, Balaguer | Futures | Clay | (Spain) Carlos Rexach Itoiz | (Spain) Miguel Ángel López Jaén (Spain) Pablo Santos González | 7–6^{(7–4)}, 6–3 |
| Loss | 3–13 | May 2005 | Spain F9, Reus | Futures | Clay | (Spain) Pablo Santos González | (Spain) Marc Fornell Mestres (Togo) Komlavi Loglo | 7–5, 5–7, 1–6 |
| Win | 4–13 | May 2005 | Spain F14, Alicante | Futures | Clay | (Spain) Pablo Santos González | (Spain) Pablo Andújar (Japan) Jun Kato | 3–6, 7–5, 6–2 |
| Loss | 4–14 | May 2005 | Spain F16, Gandia | Futures | Clay | (Spain) Pablo Santos González | (Spain) Marc Fornell Mestres (Spain) Jordi Marsé-Vidri | 6–4, 3–6, 6–7^{(4–7)} |
| Win | 5–14 | Oct 2005 | Spain F27, El Ejido | Futures | Hard | (Spain) Marcel Granollers | (Spain) Marcos Jiménez-Letrado (Spain) Juan-Miguel Such-Pérez | 6–4, 6–4 |
| Win | 6–14 | Oct 2005 | Barcelona, Spain | Challenger | Clay | (Spain) Gabriel Trujillo Soler | (Netherlands) Bart Beks (Netherlands) Matwé Middelkoop | 6–4, 6–4 |
| Loss | 5–15 | Oct 2005 | Spain F29, Barcelona | Futures | Clay | (Spain) Gabriel Trujillo Soler | (Spain) Antonio Baldellou-Esteva (Spain) Germán Puentes Alcañiz | 6–7^{(4–7)}, 4–6 |
| Win | 7–15 | Nov 2005 | Spain F32, Gran Canaria | Futures | Hard | (Spain) Marcel Granollers | (Spain) Antonio Baldellou-Esteva (Aruba) José Luis Muguruza | 6–1, 6–3 |
| Win | 8–15 | Feb 2006 | Spain F4, Yecla | Futures | Hard | (Spain) Gabriel Trujillo Soler | (Uzbekistan) Farrukh Dustov (Russia) Denis Matsukevich | 6–1, 6–2 |
| Win | 9–15 | Feb 2006 | Spain F5, Murcia | Futures | Clay | (Spain) Pablo Santos González | (Spain) Javier Foronda Bolaños (Spain) Daniel Monedero-González | 6–2, 6–4 |
| Win | 10–15 | Feb 2006 | Spain F7, Cartagena | Futures | Clay | (Spain) Pablo Santos González | (Spain) Marc Fornell Mestres (Spain) Héctor Ruiz-Cadenas | 6–2, 6–4 |
| Win | 11–15 | Apr 2006 | Spain F8, Zaragoza | Futures | Clay | (Spain) Pablo Santos González | (Spain) Marc Fornell Mestres (Spain) Jordi Marsé-Vidri | 6–4, 6–3 |
| Loss | 11–16 | May 2006 | Telde, Spain | Challenger | Clay | (Spain) Daniel Muñoz de la Nava | (Poland) Adam Chadaj (Sweden) Michael Ryderstedt | 7–5, 3–6, [7–10] |
| Win | 12–16 | May 2006 | Spain F15, Balaguer | Futures | Clay | (Spain) Pablo Santos González | (Spain) Marc Fornell Mestres (Spain) Jordi Marsé-Vidri | 6–3, 6–4 |
| Loss | 12–17 | Sep 2006 | Spain F28, Oviedo | Futures | Clay | (Spain) Miguel Ángel López Jaén | (Spain) Marc Fornell Mestres (Spain) Juan-Miguel Such-Pérez | 6–7^{(2–7)}, 4–6 |
| Loss | 12–18 | Sep 2006 | Spain F29, Móstoles | Futures | Hard | (Spain) Miguel Ángel López Jaén | (Togo) Komlavi Loglo (Spain) Carlos Rexach Itoiz | 6–7^{(5–7)}, 4–6 |
| Loss | 12–19 | Oct 2006 | Bratislava, Slovakia | Challenger | Clay | (Spain) Pablo Santos González | (Italy) Flavio Cipolla (Spain) Marcel Granollers | 6–7^{(2–7)}, 4–6 |
| Win | 13–19 | Oct 2006 | Spain F35, Sant Cugat | Futures | Clay | (Spain) Miguel Ángel López Jaén | (Argentina) Diego Álvarez (Spain) Carlos Poch Gradin | 6–4, 6–2 |
| Loss | 13–20 | Nov 2006 | Spain F36, Vilafranca | Futures | Clay | (Spain) Miguel Ángel López Jaén | (Argentina) Diego Álvarez (Spain) Carlos Poch Gradin | 6–7^{(2–7)}, 3–6 |
| Win | 14–20 | Jan 2007 | Spain F2, Calvià | Futures | Clay | (Spain) Miguel Ángel López Jaén | (Spain) José Antonio Sánchez de Luna (Spain) Santiago Ventura | 7–5, 6–7^{(5–7)}, 7–6^{(8–6)} |
| Win | 15–20 | Feb 2007 | Spain F5, Murcia | Futures | Clay | (Spain) Miguel Ángel López Jaén | (Spain) Carlos Poch Gradin (Spain) Carlos Rexach Itoiz | 4–6, 7–5, 6–3 |
| Win | 16–20 | Mar 2007 | Barletta, Italy | Challenger | Clay | (Spain) Albert Portas | (Italy) Alessandro Motti (Italy) Simone Vagnozzi | 6–4, 6–4 |
| Win | 17–20 | Apr 2007 | Spain F15, Reus | Futures | Clay | (Spain) Pablo Santos González | (Spain) Julián Alonso (Spain) Gerard Granollers Pujol | 6–4, 6–4 |
| Loss | 17–21 | Jun 2007 | France F8, Blois | Futures | Clay | (Spain) Daniel Muñoz de la Nava | (France) Adrian Mannarino (France) Josselin Ouanna | 2–6, 1–6 |
| Win | 18–21 | Jul 2007 | France F9, Toulon | Futures | Clay | (France) Augustin Gensse | (Italy) Adriano Biasella (Uruguay) Marcel Felder | 2–6, 6–3, 7–6^{(7–5)} |
| Loss | 18–22 | Oct 2007 | Portugal F4, Porto | Futures | Clay | (Spain) Pablo Santos González | (Switzerland) Yann Marti (Argentina) Cristian Villagrán | w/o |
| Loss | 18–23 | Oct 2007 | Spain F38, Sant Cugat | Futures | Clay | (Spain) Miguel Ángel López Jaén | (Spain) Marc Fornell Mestres (Spain) Jordi Marsé-Vidri | 7–5, 0–6, [4–10] |
| Win | 19–23 | Sep 2008 | Brașov, Romania | Challenger | Clay | (Spain) Daniel Muñoz de la Nava | (Spain) Carlos Poch Gradin (Spain) Pablo Santos González | 6–4, 6–3 |
| Win | 20–23 | Sep 2008 | Seville, Spain | Challenger | Clay | (Spain) Pablo Santos González | (Brazil) Rogério Dutra Silva (Brazil) Flávio Saretta | 2–6, 6–2, [10–8] |
| Win | 21–23 | Sep 2008 | Szczecin, Poland | Challenger | Clay | (Poland) Dawid Olejniczak | (Poland) Łukasz Kubot (Austria) Oliver Marach | 7–6^{(7–4)}, 6–3 |
| Win | 22–23 | Mar 2009 | Caltanissetta, Italy | Challenger | Clay | (Argentina) Juan Pablo Brzezicki | (Italy) Daniele Bracciali (Italy) Simone Vagnozzi | 7–6^{(7–5)}, 6–3 |
| Win | 23–23 | Apr 2009 | Napoli, Italy | Challenger | Clay | (Uruguay) Pablo Cuevas | (Germany) Frank Moser (Czech Republic) Lukáš Rosol | 6–4, 6–3 |
| Win | 24–23 | Jun 2009 | Constanța, Romania | Challenger | Clay | (Chile) Adrián García | (Romania) Adrian Cruciat (Romania) Florin Mergea | 7–6^{(7–5)}, 6–2 |
| Win | 25–23 | Oct 2009 | Montevideo, Uruguay | Challenger | Clay | (Argentina) Juan Pablo Brzezicki | (Uruguay) Martín Cuevas (Uruguay) Pablo Cuevas | 6–4, 6–4 |
| Loss | 25–24 | Oct 2009 | Santiago, Chile | Challenger | Clay | (Argentina) Juan Pablo Brzezicki | (Argentina) Diego Cristin (Argentina) Eduardo Schwank | 4–6, 5–7 |
| Loss | 25–25 | Nov 2009 | São Paulo, Brazil | Challenger | Clay | (Argentina) Diego Junqueira | (Brazil) Franco Ferreiro (Brazil) Ricardo Mello | 3–6, 3–6 |
| Loss | 25–26 | Nov 2009 | Medellín, Colombia | Challenger | Clay | (Argentina) Diego Junqueira | (Argentina) Sebastián Decoud (Argentina) Eduardo Schwank | 0–6, 2–6 |
| Win | 26–26 | Mar 2010 | Caltanissetta, Italy | Challenger | Clay | (Spain) Santiago Ventura | (Belarus) Uladzimir Ignatik (Slovakia) Martin Kližan | 7–6^{(7–3)}, 6–4 |
| Win | 27–26 | Mar 2010 | Barletta, Italy | Challenger | Clay | (Spain) Santiago Ventura | (Serbia) Ilija Bozoljac (Italy) Daniele Bracciali | 6–3, 6–3 |
| Win | 28–26 | Apr 2010 | Saint Brieuc, France | Challenger | Clay (i) | (Belarus) Uladzimir Ignatik | (United States) Brian Battistone (United States) Ryler DeHeart | 4–6, 6–4, [10–5] |
| Win | 29–26 | Apr 2010 | Monza, Italy | Challenger | Clay | (Italy) Daniele Bracciali | (Austria) Martin Fischer (Denmark) Frederik Nielsen | 6–3, 6–3 |
| Win | 30–26 | Jun 2010 | Prostějov, Czech Republic | Challenger | Clay | (Spain) Marcel Granollers | (Sweden) Johan Brunström (Netherlands Antilles) Jean-Julien Rojer | 3–6, 6–4, [10–6] |
| Loss | 30–27 | Jun 2011 | Prostějov, Czech Republic | Challenger | Clay | (Spain) Rubén Ramírez Hidalgo | (Ukraine) Sergey Bubka (Spain) Adrián Menéndez Maceiras | 5–7, 2–6 |
| Win | 31–27 | Oct 2011 | Madrid, Spain | Challenger | Clay | (Spain) Rubén Ramírez Hidalgo | (Spain) Daniel Gimeno Traver (United Kingdom) Morgan Phillips | 4–6, 7–6^{(10–8)}, [11–9] |
| Win | 32–27 | Dec 2013 | Spain F41, Puerto del Carmen | Futures | Hard | (Spain) Marcos Conde-Jackson | (Spain) Juan-Samuel Arauzo-Martínez (Spain) Jaime Pulgar-García | 6–3, 6–3 |
| Win | 33–27 | Apr 2019 | Murcia, Spain | Challenger | Clay | (New Zealand) Marcus Daniell | (Australia) Rameez Junaid (Belarus) Andrei Vasilevski | 6–4, 6–4 |
| Win | 34–27 | Oct 2024 | M25 Zaraguza, Spain | Futures | Clay | (Spain) Sergi Fita Juan | (Spain) Juan-Samuel Arauzo-Martinez (Spain) Alberto Colas Sanchez | 6–4, 7–6^{(7–5)} |

== Doubles performance timeline ==
Key
| W | F | SF | QF | #R | RR | Q# | DNQ | A | NH |

(W) winner; (F) finalist; (SF) semifinalist; (QF) quarterfinalist; (#R) rounds 4, 3, 2, 1; (RR) round-robin stage; (Q#) qualification round; (DNQ) did not qualify; (A) absent; (NH) not held; (SR) strike rate (events won / competed); (W–L) win–loss record.
To avoid confusion and double counting, these charts are updated at the conclusion of a tournament or when the player's participation has ended.

| Tournament | 2009 | 2010 | 2011 | 2012 | 2013 | 2014 | 2015 | 2016 | 2017 | 2018 | 2019 | SR | W–L |
|---|---|---|---|---|---|---|---|---|---|---|---|---|---|
Grand Slam tournaments
| Australian Open | A | A | 3R | 2R | QF | 2R | QF | 1R | 1R | 2R | 1R | 0 / 9 | 11–9 |
| French Open | A | 1R | 2R | 2R | QF | 2R | 2R | 2R | 3R | 1R | A | 0 / 9 | 10–9 |
| Wimbledon | Q1 | 2R | 2R | 3R | 2R | 3R | 1R | 1R | A | 1R | A | 0 / 8 | 7–8 |
| US Open | A | 2R | QF | 1R | 1R | QF | 1R | 3R | 1R | 1R | A | 0 / 9 | 9–9 |
| Win–loss | 0–0 | 2–3 | 7–4 | 4–4 | 7–4 | 7–4 | 4–4 | 3–4 | 2–3 | 1–4 | 0–1 | 0 / 35 | 37–35 |
Year-end championship
| ATP World Tour Finals | A | A | A | A | W | A | A | A | A | A | A | 1 / 1 | 4–1 |
ATP Masters Series 1000
| Indian Wells | A | A | 1R | A | 1R | 2R | 1R | 1R | A | 2R | A | 0 / 6 | 2–6 |
| Miami | A | A | 2R | QF | 2R | QF | 1R | 2R | A | A | A | 0 / 6 | 7–6 |
| Monte Carlo | A | A | A | 2R | SF | A | A | 2R | A | A | A | 0 / 3 | 5–3 |
| Madrid (Clay) | A | 1R | A | 2R | SF | SF | 2R | A | 1R | 2R | 1R | 0 / 8 | 7–8 |
| Rome | A | A | 1R | 1R | QF | QF | W | A | A | A | A | 1 / 5 | 8–4 |
| Canada | A | A | A | A | A | 1R | 1R | A | A | A | A | 0 / 2 | 0–2 |
| Cincinnati | A | A | A | A | A | 2R | 1R | A | A | A | A | 0 / 2 | 0–2 |
| Shanghai | A | 2R | A | 1R | F | 2R | 1R | A | A | A | A | 0 / 5 | 5–4 |
| Paris | A | 2R | 1R | A | 2R | 2R | 1R | 1R | A | A | A | 0 / 6 | 2–6 |
| Win–loss | 0–0 | 2–2 | 1–4 | 4–5 | 12–7 | 7–8 | 6–7 | 2–4 | 0–1 | 2–2 | 0–1 | 1 / 43 | 36–41 |
Career statistics
| Titles | 0 | 2 | 0 | 4 | 4 | 0 | 1 | 2 | 0 | 1 | 0 | 14 | |
| Finals | 0 | 2 | 4 | 6 | 5 | 3 | 3 | 4 | 2 | 1 | 0 | 30 | |
| Year-end ranking | 102 | 40 | 40 | 23 | 5 | 28 | 30 | 41 | 77 | 64 | 255 | | |
