= Internazionali di Monza e Brianza =

Defunct tennis tournament
- Event name: Monza
- Founded: 2005
- Abolished: 2012
- Editions: 8
- Location: Monza, Italy
- Venue: Circolo Tennis Monza
- Category: ATP Challenger Tour
- Surface: Clay (red)
- Draw: 32S/19Q/16D

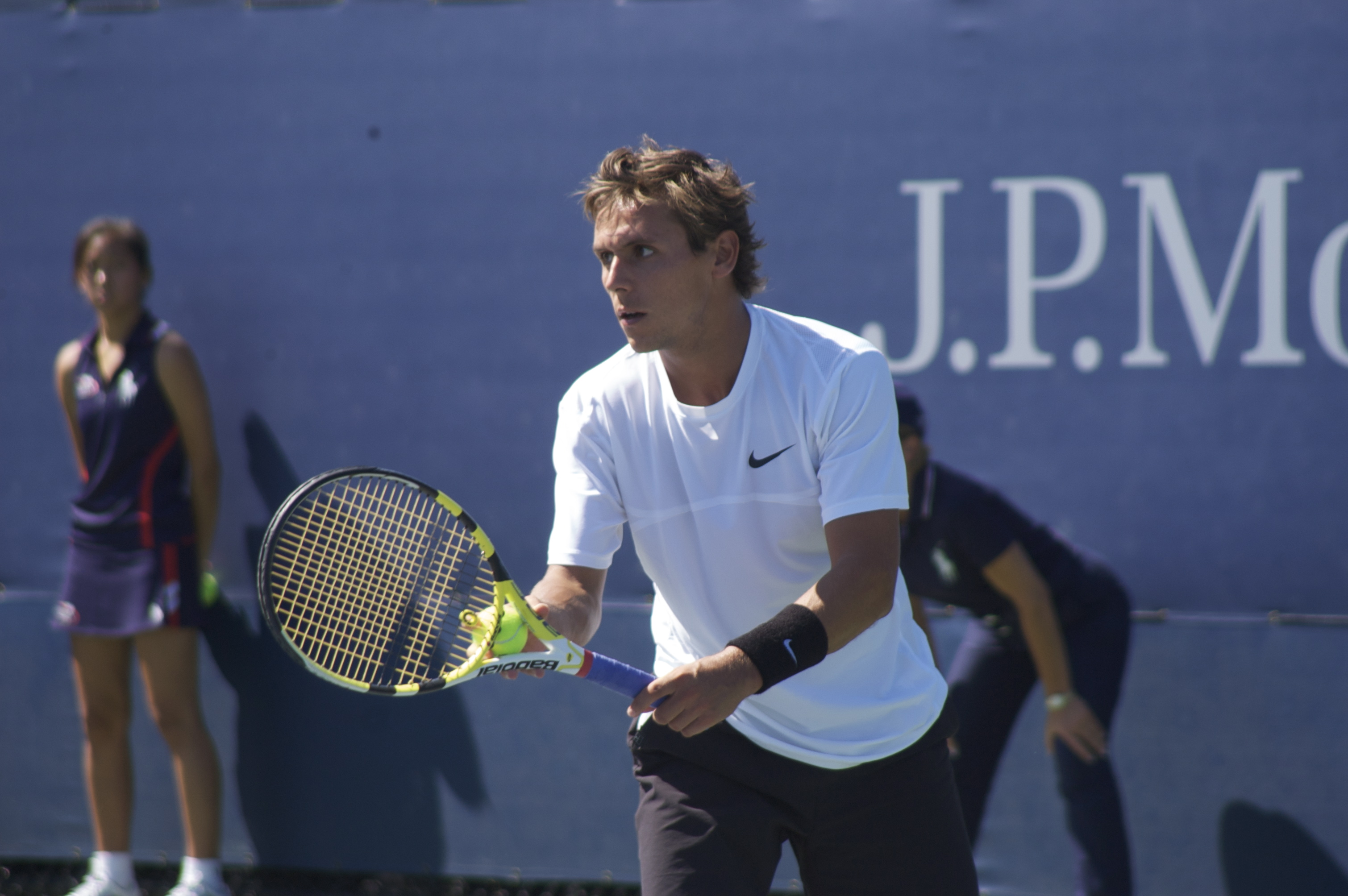
Frenchman Nicolas Devilder, the 2005 doubles champion (w/Patience) and singles runner-up, eventually took the singles in 2006 over Flavio Cipolla

The Internazionali di Monza E Brianza was a professional tennis tournament played on outdoor red clay courts from 2005 to 2012, held at the Circolo Tennis Monza in Monza, northern Italy. It was part of the ATP Challenger Tour.

== Finals ==
=== Singles ===
Year	Champion	Runner-up	Score
2012	(Spain) Daniel Gimeno Traver	(Spain) Albert Montañés	6–2, 4–6, 6–4
2011	(Germany) Julian Reister	(Italy) Alessio di Mauro	2–6, 6–3, 6–3
2010	(Germany) Daniel Brands	(Spain) Pablo Andújar	6–7(4), 6–3, 6–4
2009	(Spain) David Marrero	(Croatia) Antonio Veić	5–7, 6–4, 6–4
2008	(Spain) Albert Montañés	(Spain) Alberto Martín	3–6, 7–6(1), 6–3
2007	(Austria) Werner Eschauer	(Czech Republic) Jan Hájek	6–0, 3–0 retired
2006	(France) Nicolas Devilder	(Italy) Flavio Cipolla	6–2, 7–5
2005	(Italy) Alessio di Mauro	(France) Nicolas Devilder	6–1, 2–6, 6–3

=== Doubles ===
Year	Champions	Runners-up	Score
2012	(Kazakhstan) Andrey Golubev (Kazakhstan) Yuri Schukin	(Russia) Teymuraz Gabashvili (Italy) Stefano Ianni	7–6^{(7–4)}, 5–7, [10–7]
2011	(Sweden) Johan Brunström (Denmark) Frederik Nielsen	(United Kingdom) Jamie Delgado (United Kingdom) Jonathan Marray	5–7, 6–2, [10–7]
2010	(Italy) Daniele Bracciali (Spain) David Marrero	(Austria) Martin Fischer (Denmark) Frederik Nielsen	6–3, 6–3
2009	(United Kingdom) James Auckland (United States) Travis Rettenmaier	(Czech Republic) Dušan Karol (Czech Republic) Jaroslav Pospíšil	7–5, 6–7(6), 10–4
2008	(Italy) Stefano Galvani (Spain) Alberto Martín	(Germany) Denis Gremelmayr (Germany) Simon Greul	7–5, 2–6, 10–3
2007	(Australia) Nathan Healey (Australia) Jordan Kerr	(Brazil) Ricardo Hocevar (Brazil) Alexandre Simoni	6–4, 6–3
2006	(Spain) Rubén Ramírez Hidalgo (Italy) Tomas Tenconi	(Italy) Leonardo Azzaro (Germany) Christopher Kas	4–6, 6–4, 13–11
2005	(France) Nicolas Devilder (France) Olivier Patience	(Italy) Massimo Bertolini (Italy) Uros Vico	7–5, 6–4
