= Stefano Ianni =

Italian tennis player

- Country (sports): Italy
- Born: 31 January 1981 (age 45)
- Turned pro: 2000
- Retired: 2013
- Plays: Right-handed
- Prize money: $121,254

Singles
- Career record: 1–1
- Career titles: 0
- Highest ranking: No. 300 (11 June 2007)

Grand Slam singles results
- Wimbledon: Q1 (2007)

Doubles
- Career record: 0–1
- Career titles: 0
- Highest ranking: No. 118 (6 May 2013)
- Last updated on: 17 July 2021.

Stefano Ianni (Italian pronunciation: [ˈsteːfano ˈjanni, ˈstɛː-]; born 31 January 1981) is an Italian former professional tennis player.

Ianni competed mainly on the ATP Challenger Tour and ITF Futures, both in singles and doubles. He reached his highest ATP singles ranking, No. 300 on 11 June 2007, and his highest ATP doubles ranking, No. 118, on 6 May 2013.

== ATP Challenger and ITF Futures finals ==
=== Singles: 14 (5–9) ===
Legend ATP Challenger (0–0) ITF Futures (5–9)	Finals by surface Hard (1–1) Clay (4–8) Grass (0–0) Carpet (0–0)

Result	W–L	Date	Tournament	Tier	Surface	Opponent	Score
Loss	0–1	Jul 2004	Italy F17, Arezzo	Futures	Clay	(Argentina) Máximo González	3–6, 3–6
Loss	0–2	Sep 2004	Sweden F2, Gothenburg	Futures	Hard	(Sweden) Johan Settergren	0–5 ret.
Loss	0–3	Aug 2005	Slovakia F1, Žilina	Futures	Clay	(Czech Republic) Jaroslav Pospíšil	6–2, 6–7^{(4–7)}, 4–6
Loss	0–4	Aug 2006	Lithuania F1, Vilnius	Futures	Clay	(Czech Republic) Adam Vejmelka	6–4, 6–7^{(7–9)}, 4–6
Win	1–4	Aug 2006	Lithuania F2, Vilnius	Futures	Clay	(Latvia) Andis Juška	7–5, 3–6, 6–3
Loss	1–5	Mar 2007	Croatia F3, Poreč	Futures	Clay	(Croatia) Vjekoslav Skenderovic	2–6, 6–4, 3–6
Win	2–5	May 2007	USA F10, Orange Park	Futures	Clay	(Italy) Adriano Biasella	6–3, 1–6, 6–4
Loss	2–6	May 2007	USA F11, Tampa	Futures	Clay	(Dominican Republic) Víctor Estrella Burgos	2–6, 2–6
Win	3–6	May 2008	Italy F11, Aosta	Futures	Clay	(Chile) Guillermo Hormazábal	3–6, 6–3, 6–4
Win	4–6	Aug 2008	Lithuania F1, Vilnius	Futures	Clay	(Sweden) Tim Goransson	2–6, 6–4, 6–4
Win	5–6	Oct 2009	Italy F31, Naples	Futures	Hard	(Italy) Andrea Falgheri	6–2, 6–3
Loss	5–7	Jan 2010	USA F2, Hollywood	Futures	Clay	(France) Éric Prodon	4–6, 6–7^{(2–7)}
Loss	5–8	May 2010	USA F11, Orange Park	Futures	Clay	(Italy) Matteo Viola	2–6, 1–6
Loss	5–9	Jul 2010	Italy F17, Fano	Futures	Clay	(Croatia) Nikola Mektić	2–6, 0–6

=== Doubles: 38 (22–16) ===
Legend ATP Challenger (6–6) ITF Futures (16–10)	Finals by surface Hard (4–1) Clay (18–15) Grass (0–0) Carpet (0–0)

Result	W–L	Date	Tournament	Tier	Surface	Partner	Opponents	Score
Win	1–0	Jul 2004	Denmark F3, Lyngby	Futures	Clay	(Netherlands) Bart Beks	(Finland) Iouri Barkov (Finland) Juho Paukku	6–2, 6–1
Loss	1–1	Aug 2004	Italy F18, Foligno	Futures	Clay	(Bosnia and Herzegovina) Ismar Gorčić	(Italy) Stefano Mocci (Italy) Giancarlo Petrazzuolo	6–4, 6–7^{(6–8)}, 5–7
Win	2–1	Sep 2004	Sweden F2, Gothenburg	Futures	Hard	(Italy) Fabio Colangelo	(Sweden) Ervin Eleskovic (Sweden) Pablo Figueroa	7–6^{(7–3)}, 6–1
Loss	2–2	Mar 2005	Italy F5, Catania	Futures	Clay	(Bulgaria) Yordan Kanev	(Italy) Flavio Cipolla (Italy) Francesco Piccari	3–6, 4–6
Win	3–2	May 2005	Italy F11, Valdengo	Futures	Clay	(Italy) Marco Crugnola	(Italy) Mattia Livraghi (Italy) Giuseppe Menga	6–2, 6–1
Win	4–2	Nov 2005	USA F29, Honolulu	Futures	Hard	(Italy) Marco Crugnola	(United States) Brendan Evans (United States) Pete Stroer	1–6, 6–3, 7–6^{(7–4)}
Win	5–2	Jun 2006	Italy F18, Bassano	Futures	Clay	(Italy) Fabio Colangelo	(Russia) Andrey Golubev (Uzbekistan) Denis Istomin	6–4, 6–4
Win	6–2	Jul 2006	Italy F20, Castelfranco	Futures	Clay	(Italy) Alberto Giraudo	(Italy) Matteo Galli (Italy) Marco Gualdi	6–3, 7–6^{(7–4)}
Win	7–2	May 2007	USA F10, Orange Park	Futures	Clay	(Italy) Adriano Biasella	(Australia) Colin Ebelthite (Australia) Clinton Thomson	4–6, 6–3, 7–6^{(7–5)}
Win	8–2	Aug 2008	Lithuania F1, Vilnius	Futures	Clay	(Italy) Uros Vico	(Sweden) Tim Goransson (Denmark) Thomas Kromann	6–2, 6–3
Loss	8–3	Aug 2008	Lithuania F2, Vilnius	Futures	Clay	(Italy) Laurent Bondaz	(Italy) Fabio Colangelo (Italy) Uros Vico	2–6, 4–6
Loss	8–4	Jan 2009	USA F2, Hollywood	Futures	Clay	(Italy) Mattia Livraghi	(Bulgaria) Grigor Dimitrov (Bulgaria) Todor Enev	1–6, 2–6
Loss	8–5	Mar 2009	Spain F10, Barcelona	Futures	Clay	(Italy) Mattia Livraghi	(Spain) Marc Fornell Mestres (Spain) Gerard Granollers Pujol	4–6, 6–3, [5–10]
Loss	8–6	May 2009	USA F9, Vero Beach	Futures	Clay	(Italy) Andrea Falgheri	(Philippines) Treat Huey (United States) Gregory Ouellette	2–6, 2–6
Win	9–6	Jul 2009	San Benedetto, Italy	Challenger	Clay	(Argentina) Cristian Villagrán	(Belgium) Niels Desein (France) Stéphane Robert	7–6^{(7–3)}, 1–6, [10–6]
Loss	9–7	Aug 2009	Italy F21, La Spezia	Futures	Clay	(Italy) Davide Della Tommasina	(Italy) Claudio Grassi (Italy) Walter Trusendi	2–6, 6–4, [7–10]
Win	10–7	Sep 2009	Italy F27, Siena	Futures	Clay	(Italy) Matteo Volante	(Italy) Manuel Jorquera (Russia) Mikhail Vasiliev	6–3, 6–4
Loss	10–8	Oct 2009	Italy F30, Quartu Sant'Elena	Futures	Hard	(Italy) Uros Vico	(Spain) Oscar Burrieza-Lopez (Spain) Javier Martí	5–7, 4–6
Win	11–8	Oct 2009	Italy F31, Naples	Futures	Hard	(Italy) Matteo Volante	(Italy) Claudio Grassi (Italy) Luca Vanni	6–4, 1–6, [10–6]
Win	12–8	Jan 2010	USA F1, Plantation	Futures	Clay	(Latvia) Deniss Pavlovs	(United States) Marcus Fugate (The Bahamas) Timothy Neilly	6–2, 6–2
Win	13–8	Jan 2010	USA F2, Hollywood	Futures	Clay	(Italy) Matteo Viola	(Spain) Arnau Brugués Davi (Dominican Republic) Víctor Estrella Burgos	6–7^{(1–7)}, 6–1, [10–7]
Loss	13–9	Jan 2010	USA F3, Tamarac	Futures	Clay	(Italy) Matteo Viola	(Romania) Catalin-Ionut Gard (United States) Christian Guevara	6–2, 4–6, [6–10]
Loss	13–10	Jun 2010	Italy F11, Bergamo	Futures	Clay	(Italy) Matteo Volante	(Italy) Alessandro Giannessi (Denmark) Frederik Nielsen	4–6, 6–7^{(3–7)}
Win	14–10	Jul 2010	Italy F17, Fano	Futures	Clay	(Italy) Claudio Grassi	(Greece) Alexandros Jakupovic (Austria) Max Raditschnigg	6–3, 7–5
Win	15–10	Jul 2011	Italy F19, Fano	Futures	Clay	(Italy) Luca Vanni	(Mexico) César Ramírez (Australia) Nima Roshan	6–7^{(2–7)}, 6–3, [10–6]
Loss	15–11	Aug 2011	Trani, Italy	Challenger	Clay	(Italy) Giulio Di Meo	(Chile) Jorge Aguilar (Argentina) Andrés Molteni	4–6, 4–6
Win	16–11	Aug 2011	Italy F22, Appiano	Futures	Clay	(Italy) Alessandro Giannessi	(Argentina) Andrés Molteni (Argentina) Marco Trungelliti	6–2, 6–0
Win	17–11	Aug 2011	San Sebastián, Spain	Challenger	Clay	(Italy) Simone Vagnozzi	(Spain) Daniel Gimeno Traver (Spain) Israel Sevilla	6–3, 6–4
Win	18–11	Sep 2011	Todi, Italy	Challenger	Clay	(Italy) Luca Vanni	(Austria) Martin Fischer (Italy) Alessandro Motti	6–4, 1–6, [11–9]
Loss	18–12	Jun 2012	Monza, Italy	Challenger	Clay	(Russia) Teymuraz Gabashvili	(Kazakhstan) Andrey Golubev (Kazakhstan) Yuri Schukin	6–7^{(4–7)}, 7–5, [7–10]
Win	19–12	Jun 2012	Italy F14, Busto Arsizio	Futures	Clay	(Italy) Walter Trusendi	(Italy) Antonio Comporto (Serbia) Boris Pashanski	6–3, 6–3
Loss	19–13	Jul 2012	San Benedetto, Italy	Challenger	Clay	(Italy) Gianluca Naso	(Australia) Brydan Klein (Australia) Dane Propoggia	6–3, 4–6, [10–12]
Win	20–13	Jul 2012	Orbetello, Italy	Challenger	Clay	(Australia) Dane Propoggia	(Italy) Alessio di Mauro (Italy) Simone Vagnozzi	6–3, 6–2
Loss	20–14	Aug 2012	San Marino, San Marino	Challenger	Clay	(Italy) Matteo Viola	(Czech Republic) Lukáš Dlouhý (Slovakia) Michal Mertiňák	6–2, 6–7^{(3–7)}, [9–11]
Win	21–14	Aug 2012	Segovia, Spain	Challenger	Hard	(Romania) Florin Mergea	(Russia) Konstantin Kravchuk (Austria) Nikolaus Moser	6–2, 6–3
Loss	21–15	Apr 2013	Barranquilla, Colombia	Challenger	Clay	(Brazil) Fabiano de Paula	(Argentina) Facundo Bagnis (Argentina) Federico Delbonis	3–6, 5–7
Win	22–15	May 2013	Naples, Italy	Challenger	Clay	(Italy) Potito Starace	(Kazakhstan) Andrey Golubev (Italy) Alessandro Giannessi	6–1, 6–3
Loss	22–16	Sep 2013	Como, Italy	Challenger	Clay	(Italy) Marco Crugnola	(Australia) Rameez Junaid (Slovakia) Igor Zelenay	5–7, 6–7^{(2–7)}
