= 2016 Franken Challenge – Doubles =

Men's tennis tournament

Doubles
- 2016 Franken Challenge

Final
- Champion: (Argentina) Facundo Argüello (Venezuela) Roberto Maytín
- Runner-up: (Slovakia) Andrej Martin (Austria) Tristan-Samuel Weissborn
- Score: 6–3, 6–4

Events
Singles	Doubles
← 2015 ·	Franken Challenge	· 2017 →

Guillermo Durán and Horacio Zeballos were the defending champions but chose not to participate.

Facundo Argüello and Roberto Maytín won the title after defeating Andrej Martin and Tristan-Samuel Weissborn 6–3, 6–4 in the final.

== Seeds ==
1. (Slovakia) Andrej Martin / (Austria) Tristan-Samuel Weissborn (final)
2. (Moldova) Radu Albot / (Belarus) Sergey Betov (first round)
3. (Australia) Rameez Junaid / (Mexico) Miguel Ángel Reyes-Varela (semifinals)
4. (Argentina) Máximo González / (Venezuela) Luis David Martínez (quarterfinals)

== Draw ==
Key

- Q = Qualifier
- WC = Wild card
- LL = Lucky loser
- Alt = Alternate
- ITF = ITF entry
- PR = Protected ranking
- SR = Special ranking
- SE = Special exempt
- JE = Junior exempt
- JR = Junior Accelerator Programme entrant
- CO = College Accelerator Programme entrant
- NG = Next Gen Accelerator Program entrant
- w/o = Walkover
- r = Retired
- d = Defaulted

First round
1	(Slovakia) A Martin (Austria) T-S Weissborn	7^{7}	6
(Poland) T Bednarek (Germany) F Moser	6^{1}	1
Alt	(Colombia) N Barrientos (India) J Nedunchezhiyan	5	3
(Uruguay) A Behar (Brazil) F Neis	7	6
3	(Australia) R Junaid (Mexico) MÁ Reyes-Varela	3	7	[12]
(Austria) G Melzer (Brazil) T Monteiro	6	5	[10]
(Italy) A Arnaboldi (Germany) A Satschko	6	7^{7}
(Kazakhstan) A Golubev (Tunisia) M Jaziri	4	6^{5}
WC	(Germany) K Krawietz (Croatia) D Marcan	7	6
WC	(Germany) J Härteis (Germany) M Marterer	5	4
(China) Y Bai (Italy) R Ghedin	4	3
4	(Argentina) M González (Venezuela) LD Martínez	6	6
WC	(Germany) N Langer (Germany) S Stadler	4	4
PR	(Argentina) F Argüello (Venezuela) R Maytín	6	6
PR	(Germany) T Kamke (Germany) P Marx	6	7
2	(Moldova) R Albot (Belarus) S Betov	3	5

Quarterfinals
1	(Slovakia) A Martin (Austria) T-S Weissborn	7	7^{7}
(Uruguay) A Behar (Brazil) F Neis	5	6^{4}
3	(Australia) R Junaid (Mexico) MÁ Reyes-Varela	6	7
(Italy) A Arnaboldi (Germany) A Satschko	2	5
WC	(Germany) K Krawietz (Croatia) D Marcan	4	6	[10]
4	(Argentina) M González (Venezuela) LD Martínez	6	3	[5]
PR	(Argentina) F Argüello (Venezuela) R Maytín	5	6	[10]
PR	(Germany) T Kamke (Germany) P Marx	7	1	[6]

Semifinals
1	(Slovakia) A Martin (Austria) T-S Weissborn	6	7^{7}
3	(Australia) R Junaid (Mexico) MÁ Reyes-Varela	4	6^{5}
WC	(Germany) K Krawietz (Croatia) D Marcan	6	3	[5]
PR	(Argentina) F Argüello (Venezuela) R Maytín	3	6	[10]

Final
1	(Slovakia) A Martin (Austria) T-S Weissborn	3	4
PR	(Argentina) F Argüello (Venezuela) R Maytín	6	6
