= 2014 Franken Challenge – Singles =

Singles
- 2014 Franken Challenge

Final
- Champions: (Germany) Tobias Kamke
- Runners-up: (Spain) Iñigo Cervantes Huegun
- Score: 6–3, 6–2

Events
| Singles | Doubles |
| ← 2013 · | Franken Challenge | · 2015 → |

João Sousa was the defending champion but chose not to compete.

Tobias Kamke won the title, defeating Iñigo Cervantes Huegun in the final, 6–3, 6–2.

== Seeds ==
1. (Slovenia) Blaž Rola (second round)
2. (Austria) Andreas Haider-Maurer (semifinals)
3. (Germany) Tobias Kamke (champion)
4. (Slovakia) Andrej Martin (semifinals)
5. (United States) Wayne Odesnik (first round)
6. (Spain) Adrián Menéndez-Maceiras (quarterfinals)
7. (France) Grégoire Burquier (quarterfinals)
8. (Portugal) Gastão Elias (second round)

== Draw ==
=== Key ===
- Q = Qualifier
- WC = Wild card
- LL = Lucky loser
- Alt = Alternate
- SE = Special exempt
- PR = Protected ranking
- ITF = ITF entry
- JE = Junior exempt
- w/o = Walkover
- r = Retired
- d = Defaulted
- SR = Special ranking

=== Finals ===
Semifinals
PR | (Spain) Iñigo Cervantes Huegun | 6 | 6
4 | (Slovakia) Andrej Martin | 0 | 3
3 | (Germany) Tobias Kamke | 6 | 6
2 | (Austria) Andreas Haider-Maurer | 1 | 2

Final
PR | (Spain) Iñigo Cervantes Huegun | 3 | 2
3 | (Germany) Tobias Kamke | 6 | 6

=== Top half ===
First round
1 | (Slovenia) B Rola | 6 | 6
Q | (Germany) P Torebko | 4 | 4
PR | (Spain) I Cervantes Huegun | 6^{3} | 7^{7} | 6
(Chile) H Podlipnik-Castillo | 7^{7} | 6^{5} | 2
WC | (Germany) R Kern | 1 | 1
PR | (Ecuador) G Lapentti | 6 | 6
(Spain) G Granollers | 1 | 3
8 | (Portugal) G Elias | 6 | 6
4 | (Slovakia) A Martin | 6 | 6
Q | (Germany) Y Maden | 2 | 2
WC | (Germany) M Marterer | 6^{4} | 3
WC | (Germany) J Härteis | 7^{7} | 6
WC | (Germany) K Krawietz | 7^{7} | 0 | 4
(Spain) R Ramírez Hidalgo | 6^{2} | 6 | 6
(Canada) S Diez | 2 | 6^{0}
6 | (Spain) A Menéndez-Maceiras | 6 | 7^{7}

Second round
1 | (Slovenia) B Rola | 6 | 1 | 2
PR | (Spain) I Cervantes Huegun | 4 | 6 | 6
PR | (Ecuador) G Lapentti | 6 | 3 | 6
8 | (Portugal) G Elias | 2 | 6 | 3
4 | (Slovakia) A Martin | 6 | 6^{5} | 7
WC | (Germany) J Härteis | 4 | 7^{7} | 5
(Spain) R Ramírez Hidalgo | 6 | 3 | 4
6 | (Spain) A Menéndez-Maceiras | 3 | 6 | 6

Quarterfinals
PR | (Spain) I Cervantes Huegun | 6 | 4 | 6
PR | (Ecuador) G Lapentti | 1 | 6 | 2
4 | (Slovakia) A Martin | 6 | 6^{1} | 6
6 | (Spain) A Menéndez-Maceiras | 1 | 7^{7} | 3

Semifinals
PR | (Spain) I Cervantes Huegun | 6 | 6
4 | (Slovakia) A Martin | 0 | 3

=== Bottom half ===
First round
7 | (France) G Burquier | 7 | 6
(Switzerland) H Laaksonen | 5 | 1
Q | (Australia) J Kubler | 6 | 7
Q | (Austria) M Neuchrist | 4 | 5
(Spain) J Samper Montaña | 4 | 7^{7} | 5
(Brazil) A Ghem | 6 | 6^{1} | 6
(Spain) R Carballés Baena | 3 | 6 | 1
3 | (Germany) T Kamke | 6 | 3 | 6
5 | (United States) W Odesnik | 7 | 5 | 2
(Republic of Ireland) L Sorensen | 5 | 7 | 6
(Belgium) K Coppejans | 7^{7} | 7
(China) Z Zhang | 6^{2} | 5
(Australia) A Bolt | 6 | 7^{7}
(Brazil) G Clezar | 2 | 6^{3}
(Switzerland) Y Marti | 4 | 7^{7} | 2
2 | (Austria) A Haider-Maurer | 6 | 6^{5} | 6

Second round
7 | (France) G Burquier | 6 | 6
Q | (Australia) J Kubler | 2 | 2
(Brazil) A Ghem | 1 | 4
3 | (Germany) T Kamke | 6 | 6
(Republic of Ireland) L Sorensen | 6 | 4 | 6
(Belgium) K Coppejans | 1 | 6 | 1
(Australia) A Bolt | 4 | 3
2 | (Austria) A Haider-Maurer | 6 | 6

Quarterfinals
7 | (France) G Burquier | 3 | 2
3 | (Germany) T Kamke | 6 | 6
(Republic of Ireland) L Sorensen | 3 | 0
2 | (Austria) A Haider-Maurer | 6 | 6

Semifinals
3 | (Germany) T Kamke | 6 | 6
2 | (Austria) A Haider-Maurer | 1 | 2
