= 2011 Franken Challenge – Singles =

Singles
- 2011 Franken Challenge

Final
- Champion: (Portugal) João Sousa
- Runner-up: (Germany) Jan-Lennard Struff
- Score: 6–2, 0–6, 6–2

Events
Singles	Doubles
← 2010 ·	Franken Challenge	· 2012 →

Robin Haase was the defending champion but decided not to participate.
João Sousa defeated Jan-Lennard Struff 6–2, 0–6, 6–2 in the final to claim his first Challenger title.

== Seeds ==
1. (Germany) Tobias Kamke (quarterfinals)
2. (Germany) Julian Reister (first round)
3. (France) Florent Serra (first round)
4. (Germany) Daniel Brands (first round)
5. (Germany) Denis Gremelmayr (semifinals)
6. (Germany) Simon Greul (quarterfinals)
7. (Poland) Jerzy Janowicz (quarterfinals)
8. (Belarus) Uladzimir Ignatik (second round)

== Draw ==
=== Key ===
- Q = Qualifier
- WC = Wild card
- LL = Lucky loser
- Alt = Alternate
- SE = Special exempt
- PR = Protected ranking
- ITF = ITF entry
- JE = Junior exempt
- w/o = Walkover
- r = Retired
- d = Defaulted
- SR = Special ranking

=== Finals ===
Semifinals
(Portugal) João Sousa	7	6
(Serbia) Nikola Ćirić	6^{5}	4
WC	(Germany) Jan-Lennard Struff	6	6
5	(Germany) Denis Gremelmayr	1	3

Final
(Portugal) João Sousa	6	0	6
WC	(Germany) Jan-Lennard Struff	2	6	2

=== Top half ===
First round
1	(Germany) T Kamke	4	7	6
(Chile) J Aguilar	6	6^{5}	3
(Germany) D Meffert	6	6^{1}	4
Q	(Germany) Alexander Flock	3	7	6
(France) G Burquier	2	2
(Portugal) J Sousa	6	6
WC	(Germany) Jean Zietsman	1	2
8	(Belarus) U Ignatik	6	6
4	(Germany) D Brands	3	6^{6}
(Serbia) N Ćirić	6	7
(Germany) B Knittel	2	3
(Australia) P Luczak	6	6
WC	(Germany) K Krawietz	6	6
WC	(Germany) M Zimmermann	3	2
Q	(Germany) P Gojowczyk	3	6^{2}
7	(Poland) J Janowicz	6	7

Second round
1	(Germany) T Kamke	6	6
Q	(Germany) A Flock	4	3
(Portugal) J Sousa	3	7	7
8	(Belarus) U Ignatik	6	5	5
(Serbia) N Ćirić	7	7
(Australia) P Luczak	5	6^{2}
WC	(Germany) K Krawietz	6^{2}	3
7	(Poland) J Janowicz	7	6

Quarterfinals
1	(Germany) T Kamke	6	3	3
(Portugal) J Sousa	2	6	6
(Serbia) N Ćirić	7	5	7
7	(Poland) J Janowicz	5	7	5

Semifinals
(Portugal) J Sousa	7	6
(Serbia) N Ćirić	6^{5}	4

=== Bottom half ===
First round
6	(Germany) S Greul	6	1	6
(Romania) V Crivoi	4	6	3
(Netherlands) I Sijsling	6	2	2
(Argentina) L Mayer	2	6	6
(Germany) C-M Stebe	6	6
Q	(Germany) D Kindlmann	3	2
WC	(Germany) Jan-Lennard Struff	6	6^{5}	6
3	(France) F Serra	2	7	1
5	(Germany) D Gremelmayr	7	7
(Spain) R Bautista-Agut	5	5
(Colombia) R Farah	2	6	6
(Spain) G Alcaide	6	4	1
(Germany) S Rieschick	3	3
(Romania) M Copil	6	6
Q	(France) R Jouan	6	6
2	(Germany) J Reister	2	3

Second round
6	(Germany) S Greul	5	6	7
(Argentina) L Mayer	7	3	6^{5}
(Germany) C-M Stebe	7	3	3
WC	(Germany) J-L Struff	6^{1}	6	6
5	(Germany) D Gremelmayr	6	6
(Colombia) R Farah	0	1
(Romania) M Copil	3	3
Q	(France) R Jouan	6	6

Quarterfinals
6	(Germany) S Greul	4	1
WC	(Germany) J-L Struff	6	6
5	(Germany) D Gremelmayr	6	7
Q	(France) R Jouan	4	6^{3}

Semifinals
WC	(Germany) J-L Struff	6	6
5	(Germany) D Gremelmayr	1	3
