= 2016 Franken Challenge – Singles =

Singles
- 2016 Franken Challenge

Final
- Champion: (Moldova) Radu Albot
- Runner-up: (Germany) Jan-Lennard Struff
- Score: 6–3, 6–4

Events
Singles	Doubles
- Franken Challenge

Taro Daniel was the defending champion but failed to defend his title, losing to Thiago Monteiro in the second round.

Radu Albot won the title after defeating Jan-Lennard Struff 6–3, 6–4 in the final.

== Seeds ==
1. (Tunisia) Malek Jaziri (second round, retired)
2. (Japan) Taro Daniel (second round)
3. (Spain) Albert Montañés (quarterfinals)
4. (Germany) Jan-Lennard Struff (final)
5. (Spain) Roberto Carballés Baena (first round)
6. (Italy) Thomas Fabbiano (first round)
7. (Netherlands) Thiemo de Bakker (first round)
8. (Slovakia) Jozef Kovalík (quarterfinals)

== Draw ==
Key

- Q = Qualifier
- WC = Wild card
- LL = Lucky loser
- Alt = Alternate
- ITF = ITF entry
- PR = Protected ranking
- SR = Special ranking
- SE = Special exempt
- JE = Junior exempt
- JR = Junior Accelerator Programme entrant
- CO = College Accelerator Programme entrant
- NG = Next Gen Accelerator Program entrant
- w/o = Walkover
- r = Retired
- d = Defaulted

=== Finals ===
Semifinals
(Argentina) Máximo González	7^{7}	6^{6}	3
4	(Germany) Jan-Lennard Struff	6^{3}	7^{8}	6
(Moldova) Radu Albot	6	6
(Germany) Tobias Kamke	1	4

Final
4	(Germany) Jan-Lennard Struff	3	4
(Moldova) Radu Albot	6	6

=== Top half ===
First round
1	(Tunisia) M Jaziri	7^{7}	7^{7}
(Spain) D Gimeno-Traver	6^{5}	6^{5}
Q	(Slovenia) B Rola	4	6	6^{2}
(Austria) G Melzer	6	1	7^{7}
WC	(Germany) Paul Wörner	3	3
(Italy) L Vanni	6	6
(Argentina) M González	7^{7}	6
5	(Spain) R Carballés Baena	6^{0}	1
4	(Germany) J-L Struff	6	6
(Argentina) F Argüello	3	4
WC	(Germany) M Marterer	3	3
(Kazakhstan) A Nedovyesov	6	6
(Italy) A Arnaboldi	6	3	6
(Slovakia) A Martin	2	6	0
Q	(Belgium) A De Greef	7^{7}	6^{5}	4
8	(Slovakia) J Kovalík	6^{3}	7^{7}	6

Second round
1	(Tunisia) M Jaziri	2	1^{r}
(Austria) G Melzer	6	4
(Italy) L Vanni	2	4
(Argentina) M González	6	6
4	(Germany) J-L Struff	6^{5}	7	6
(Kazakhstan) A Nedovyesov	7^{7}	5	3
(Italy) A Arnaboldi	3	4
8	(Slovakia) J Kovalík	6	6

Quarterfinals
(Austria) G Melzer	3	5
(Argentina) M González	6	7
4	(Germany) J-L Struff	3	6	6
8	(Slovakia) J Kovalík	6	2	3

Semifinals
(Argentina) M González	7^{7}	6^{6}	3
4	(Germany) J-L Struff	6^{3}	7^{8}	6

=== Bottom half ===
First round
7	(Netherlands) T de Bakker	3	2
(Moldova) R Albot	6	6
WC	(Germany) M Bachinger	3	0
(Brazil) G Clezar	6	6
Q	(Brazil) C Zampieri	6^{2}	4
PR	(Germany) J Reister	7^{7}	6
WC	(Germany) D Masur	5	3
3	(Spain) A Montañés	7	6
6	(Italy) T Fabbiano	6^{3}	1
(Germany) T Kamke	7^{7}	6
Alt	(Switzerland) H Laaksonen	4	7^{12}	3
Q	(Italy) L Sonego	6	6^{10}	6
(Belgium) R Bemelmans	6^{6}	6^{3}
(Brazil) T Monteiro	7^{8}	7^{7}
LL	(Austria) D Novak	4	4
2	(Japan) T Daniel	6	6

Second round
(Moldova) R Albot	6	6
(Brazil) G Clezar	2	2
PR	(Germany) J Reister	3	3
3	(Spain) A Montañés	6	6
(Germany) T Kamke	1	6	6
Q	(Italy) L Sonego	6	4	2
(Brazil) T Monteiro	7^{7}	6
2	(Japan) T Daniel	6^{1}	4

Quarterfinals
(Moldova) R Albot	7^{7}	6
3	(Spain) A Montañés	6^{5}	2
(Germany) T Kamke	7^{7}	6
(Brazil) T Monteiro	6^{3}	3

Semifinals
(Moldova) R Albot	6	6
(Germany) T Kamke	1	4
