= 2011 Franken Challenge =

- Date: 30 May – 5 June
- Edition: 25th
- Location: Fürth, Germany

Champions

Singles
- (Portugal) João Sousa

Doubles
- (Australia) Rameez Junaid / (Germany) Frank Moser
← 2010 ·	Franken Challenge	· 2012 →

The 2011 Franken Challenge was a professional tennis tournament played on clay courts. It was the 25th edition of the tournament which was part of the 2011 ATP Challenger Tour. It took place in Fürth, Germany between 30 May and 5 June 2011.

== ATP entrants ==
=== Seeds ===
Country	Player	Rank^{1}	Seed
GER	Tobias Kamke	76	1
GER	Julian Reister	94	2
FRA	Florent Serra	118	3
GER	Daniel Brands	130	4
GER	Denis Gremelmayr	131	5
GER	Simon Greul	138	6
POL	Jerzy Janowicz	162	7
BLR	Uladzimir Ignatik	165	8

- Rankings are as of May 23, 2011.

=== Other entrants ===
The following players received wildcards into the singles main draw:

- (Germany) Kevin Krawietz
- (Germany) Jan-Lennard Struff
- (Germany) Jean Zietsman
- (Germany) Marcel Zimmermann

The following players received entry from the qualifying draw:

- (Germany) Alexander Flock
- (Germany) Peter Gojowczyk
- (France) Romain Jouan
- (Germany) Dieter Kindlmann

== Champions ==
=== Singles ===
(Portugal) João Sousa def. (Germany) Jan-Lennard Struff, 6–2, 0–6, 6–2

=== Doubles ===
(Australia) Rameez Junaid / (Germany) Frank Moser def. (Chile) Jorge Aguilar / (Ecuador) Júlio César Campozano, 6–2, 6–7(2), [10–6]
