= 2014 Franken Challenge =

- Date: 2 – 8 June
- Edition: 27th
- Draw: 32S / 16D
- Prize money: €42,000+H
- Surface: Clay
- Location: Fürth, Germany

Champions

Singles
- (Germany) Tobias Kamke

Doubles
- (Spain) Gerard Granollers / (Spain) Jordi Samper Montaña
← 2013 ·	Franken Challenge	· 2015 →

The 2014 Franken Challenge was a professional tennis tournament played on clay courts. It was the 27th edition of the tournament which was part of the 2014 ATP Challenger Tour. It took place in Fürth, Germany between 2 and 8 June 2014.

== Singles main-draw entrants ==
=== Seeds ===
Country	Player	Rank^{1}	Seed
SLO	Blaž Rola	97	1
AUT	Andreas Haider-Maurer	104	2
GER	Tobias Kamke	106	3
SVK	Andrej Martin	158	4
USA	Wayne Odesnik	169	5
ESP	Adrián Menéndez Maceiras	174	6
FRA	Grégoire Burquier	175	7
POR	Gastão Elias	178	8

- ^{1} Rankings are as of May 26, 2014.

=== Other entrants ===
The following players received wildcards into the singles main draw:

- (Germany) Johannes Härteis
- (Germany) Robin Kern
- (Germany) Kevin Krawietz
- (Germany) Maximilian Marterer

The following players used protected ranking to gain entry into the singles main draw:

- (Spain) Iñigo Cervantes Huegun
- (Ecuador) Giovanni Lapentti

The following players received entry from the qualifying draw:

- (Germany) Peter Torebko
- (Germany) Yannick Maden
- (Australia) Jason Kubler
- (Austria) Maximilian Neuchrist

== Doubles main-draw entrants ==
=== Seeds ===
Country	Player	Country	Player	Rank^{1}	Seed
GER	Frank Moser	GER	Alexander Satschko	233	1
PHI	Ruben Gonzales	VEN	Roberto Maytín	356	2
URU	Ariel Behar	USA	Vahid Mirzadeh	375	3
TPE	Lee Hsin-han	CHN	Zhang Ze	479	4

- ^{1} Rankings are as of May 26, 2014.

=== Other entrants ===
The following pairs received wildcards into the doubles main draw:

- (Poland) Andriej Kapaś / (Poland) Błażej Koniusz
- (Germany) Johannes Härteis / (Germany) Maximilian Marterer
- (Germany) Steven Moneke / (Germany) Peter Torebko

The following pairs used protected ranking to gain entry into the doubles main draw:

- (France) Grégoire Burquier / (France) Olivier Charroin
- (Spain) Iñigo Cervantes Huegun / (Canada) Steven Diez

== Champions ==
=== Singles ===
- (Germany) Tobias Kamke def. (Spain) Iñigo Cervantes Huegun, 6–3, 6–2

=== Doubles ===
- (Spain) Gerard Granollers / (Spain) Jordi Samper Montaña def. (Spain) Adrián Menéndez Maceiras / (Spain) Rubén Ramírez Hidalgo, 7–6^{(7–1)}, 6–2
