= 2014 Franken Challenge – Doubles =

Doubles
- 2014 Franken Challenge

Final
- Champions: (Spain) Gerard Granollers (Spain) Jordi Samper Montaña
- Runners-up: (Spain) Adrián Menéndez-Maceiras (Spain) Rubén Ramírez Hidalgo
- Score: 7–6^{(7–1)}, 6–2

Events
Singles	Doubles
← 2013 ·	Franken Challenge	· 2015 →

Colin Ebelthite and Rameez Junaid were the defending champions, but decided not to compete.

Gerard Granollers and Jordi Samper Montaña won the title, defeating Adrián Menéndez-Maceiras and Rubén Ramírez Hidalgo in the final, 7–6^{(7–1)}, 6–2.

== Seeds ==
1. (Germany) Frank Moser / (Germany) Alexander Satschko (quarterfinals)
2. (Philippines) Ruben Gonzales / (Venezuela) Roberto Maytín (quarterfinals)
3. (Uruguay) Ariel Behar / (United States) Vahid Mirzadeh (semifinals)
4. (Chinese Taipei) Lee Hsin-han / (China) Zhang Ze (first round)

== Draw ==
=== Key ===
- Q = Qualifier
- WC = Wild card
- LL = Lucky loser
- Alt = Alternate
- SE = Special exempt
- PR = Protected ranking
- ITF = ITF entry
- JE = Junior exempt
- w/o = Walkover
- r = Retired
- d = Defaulted
- SR = Special ranking

=== Draw ===
First round
1	(Germany) F Moser (Germany) A Satschko	6	6
WC	(Poland) A Kapaś (Poland) B Koniusz	3	4
(Spain) G Granollers (Spain) JS Montaña	6	3	[10]
(Austria) A Haider-Maurer (Austria) M Neuchrist	2	6	[7]
3	(Uruguay) A Behar (United States) V Mirzadeh	7^{7}	4	[10]
(Portugal) G Elias (Brazil) A Ghem	6^{4}	6	[4]
(Brazil) G Clezar (Switzerland) H Laaksonen	6^{5}	6	[10]
WC	(Germany) J Härteis (Germany) M Marterer	7^{7}	2	[5]
WC	(Germany) Steven Moneke (Germany) P Torebko	6	6
PR	(France) G Burquier (France) O Charroin	4	4
(Germany) K Krawietz (Germany) P Marx	7	6
4	(Chinese Taipei) H-h Lee (China) Z Zhang	5	2
(Spain) A Menéndez-Maceiras (Spain) RR Hidalgo	6	6
PR	(Spain) IC Huegun (Canada) S Diez	1	2
(Slovakia) A Martin (United States) W Odesnik	3	7^{7}	[7]
2	(Philippines) R Gonzales (Venezuela) R Maytín	6	6^{5}	[10]

Quarterfinals
1	(Germany) F Moser (Germany) A Satschko	6	4	[2]
(Spain) G Granollers (Spain) JS Montaña	1	6	[10]
3	(Uruguay) A Behar (United States) V Mirzadeh	6	6
(Brazil) G Clezar (Switzerland) H Laaksonen	2	2
WC	(Germany) S Moneke (Germany) P Torebko	5	3
(Germany) K Krawietz (Germany) P Marx	7	6
(Spain) A Menéndez-Maceiras (Spain) RR Hidalgo	4	6	[10]
2	(Philippines) R Gonzales (Venezuela) R Maytín	6	4	[3]

Semifinals
(Spain) G Granollers (Spain) JS Montaña	6	0	[11]
3	(Uruguay) A Behar (United States) V Mirzadeh	2	6	[9]
(Germany) K Krawietz (Germany) P Marx	7^{7}	5	[4]
(Spain) A Menéndez-Maceiras (Spain) RR Hidalgo	6^{5}	7	[10]

Final
(Spain) G Granollers (Spain) JS Montaña	7^{7}	6
(Spain) A Menéndez-Maceiras (Spain) RR Hidalgo	6^{1}	2
