= 2009 Schickedanz Open – Singles =

Singles
- 2009 Schickedanz Open

Final
- Champion: (Australia) Peter Luczak
- Runner-up: (Argentina) Juan Pablo Brzezicki
- Score: 6–2, 6–0

Events
Singles	Doubles
← 2008 ·	Schickedanz Open	· 2010 →

Daniel Köllerer was the defending champion, however he lost to Daniel Brands in the quarterfinal.
Peter Luczak became the new winner, after he beat Juan Pablo Brzezicki in the final 6–2, 6–0.

== Seeds ==
1. (Russia) Teymuraz Gabashvili (semifinals)
2. (Austria) Daniel Köllerer (quarterfinals)
3. (Germany) Simon Greul (first round)
4. (Croatia) Roko Karanušić (second round)
5. (Spain) Santiago Ventura (first round)
6. (Colombia) Santiago Giraldo (first round)
7. (Spain) Rubén Ramírez Hidalgo (quarterfinals)
8. (Germany) Daniel Brands (semifinals)

== Draw ==
=== Key ===
- Q = Qualifier
- WC = Wild card
- LL = Lucky loser
- Alt = Alternate
- SE = Special exempt
- PR = Protected ranking
- ITF = ITF entry
- JE = Junior exempt
- w/o = Walkover
- r = Retired
- d = Defaulted
- SR = Special ranking

=== Final four ===
Semifinals
1	(Russia) Teymuraz Gabashvili	4	3
Q	(Australia) Peter Luczak	6	6
(Argentina) Juan Pablo Brzezicki	3	6	7
8	(Germany) Daniel Brands	6	3	6^{5}

Final
Q	(Australia) Peter Luczak	6	6
(Argentina) Juan Pablo Brzezicki	2	0

=== Top half ===
First round
1	(Russia) T Gabashvili	6	6
WC	(Germany) J Jahn	3	4
(Brazil) F Ferreiro	6	3	6
(Slovenia) G Žemlja	1	6	4
(Spain) P Riba	1	6	2
SE	(Germany) F Mayer	6	3	0^{r}
(Brazil) R Hocevar	6	3	6
6	(Colombia) S Giraldo	2	6	3
3	(Germany) S Greul	5	4
(Colombia) A Falla	7	6
SE	(Jamaica) D Brown	2	1
Q	(Australia) P Luczak	6	6
Q	(Republic of Ireland) L Sorensen	6	1	6
(Italy) P Lorenzi	3	6	3
Q	(Argentina) E Schwank	0	r
7	(Spain) R Ramírez Hidalgo	3

Second round
1	(Russia) T Gabashvili	6	4	6
(Brazil) F Ferreiro	3	6	1
(Spain) P Riba	6	6
(Brazil) R Hocevar	3	1
(Colombia) A Falla	2	2
Q	(Australia) P Luczak	6	6
Q	(Republic of Ireland) L Sorensen	3	1	r
7	(Spain) R Ramírez Hidalgo	6	2

Quarterfinals
1	(Russia) T Gabashvili	1	6	6
(Spain) P Riba	6	3	4
Q	(Australia) P Luczak	7	7
7	(Spain) R Ramírez Hidalgo	6^{2}	6^{2}

Semifinals
1	(Russia) T Gabashvili	4	3
Q	(Australia) P Luczak	6	6

=== Bottom half ===
First round
5	(Spain) S Ventura	4	4
(Germany) D Gremelmayr	6	6
(Argentina) JP Brzezicki	6	6
WC	(Germany) M Meigel	3	3
(Czech Republic) J Vaněk	4	6	6
Q	(Netherlands) T de Bakker	6	4	2
LL	(Spain) MÁ López Jaén	5	4
4	(Croatia) R Karanušić	7	6
8	(Germany) D Brands	7	2	6
(France) L Recouderc	6^{7}	6	2
(Spain) D Muñoz de la Nava	6	6
(Italy) F Volandri	1	1
WC	(Germany) P Gojowczyk	5	3
(France) A Sidorenko	7	6
(France) O Patience	2	2
2/WC	(Austria) D Köllerer	6	6

Second round
(Germany) D Gremelmayr	4	3
(Argentina) JP Brzezicki	6	6
(Czech Republic) J Vaněk	6	2	6
4	(Croatia) R Karanušić	3	6	0
8	(Germany) D Brands	6	6
(Spain) D Muñoz de la Nava	4	4
(France) A Sidorenko	2	5
2/WC	(Austria) D Köllerer	6	7

Quarterfinals
(Argentina) JP Brzezicki	7	7
(Czech Republic) J Vaněk	6^{5}	6^{4}
8	(Germany) D Brands	6	7
2/WC	(Austria) D Köllerer	2	6^{3}

Semifinals
(Argentina) JP Brzezicki	3	6	7
8	(Germany) D Brands	6	3	6^{5}
