= 2009 Schickedanz Open – Doubles =

Doubles
- 2009 Schickedanz Open

Final
- Champions: (Spain) Rubén Ramírez Hidalgo (Spain) Santiago Ventura
- Runners-up: (Germany) Simon Greul (Italy) Alessandro Motti
- Score: 4–6, 6–1, [10–6]

Events
Singles	Doubles
← 2008 ·	Schickedanz Open	· 2010 →

Philipp Marx and Alexander Peya were the defending champions, but Peya didn't start this year.
Marx partnered up with Denis Gremelmayr. However, they lost to Rubén Ramírez Hidalgo and Santiago Ventura in the semifinal. This pair won all matches and became the new champions, after won against Simon Greul and Alessandro Motti in the final.

== Seeds ==
1. (Spain) Rubén Ramírez Hidalgo / (Spain) Santiago Ventura (champions)
2. (Austria) Daniel Köllerer / (Germany) Frank Moser (quarterfinals)
3. (Germany) Denis Gremelmayr / (Germany) Philipp Marx (semifinals)
4. (Argentina) Juan Pablo Brzezicki / (Spain) David Marrero (first round, withdrew)

== Draw ==
=== Key ===
- Q = Qualifier
- WC = Wild card
- LL = Lucky loser
- Alt = Alternate
- SE = Special exempt
- PR = Protected ranking
- ITF = ITF entry
- JE = Junior exempt
- w/o = Walkover
- r = Retired
- d = Defaulted
- SR = Special ranking

=== Draw ===
First round
1	(Spain) R Ramírez Hidalgo (Spain) S Ventura	6	6
(Spain) MÁ López Jaén (Spain) P Riba	3	2
WC	(Jamaica) D Brown (Czech Republic) D Karol	6	6
(Colombia) A Falla (Colombia) S Giraldo	3	4
3	(Germany) D Gremelmayr (Germany) P Marx	6	6
(Croatia) R Karanušić (Serbia) B Pašanski	2	4
WC	(Germany) P Gojowczyk (Germany) M Meigel	1	4
(Russia) T Gabashvili (Russia) D Matsukevich	6	6
(Argentina) J-P Amado (Argentina) E Schwank	w/o
ALT	(Brazil) F Ferreiro (Spain) G Trujillo-Soler
(Germany) S Greul (Italy) A Motti
4	(Argentina) JP Brzezicki (Spain) D Marrero	w/o
(Brazil) R Hocevar (Brazil) J Souza	4	2
(Australia) P Luczak (Australia) J Sirianni	6	6
WC	(Germany) P Torebko (Germany) J Zietsman	4	2
2	(Austria) D Köllerer (Germany) F Moser	6	6

Quarterfinals
1	(Spain) R Ramírez Hidalgo (Spain) S Ventura	6	6
WC	(Jamaica) D Brown (Czech Republic) D Karol	2	4
3	(Germany) D Gremelmayr (Germany) P Marx	6	6
(Russia) T Gabashvili (Russia) D Matsukevich	4	4
ALT	(Brazil) F Ferreiro (Spain) G Trujillo-Soler	4	6	[6]
(Germany) S Greul (Italy) A Motti	6	3	[10]
(Australia) P Luczak (Australia) J Sirianni	6	7
2	(Austria) D Köllerer (Germany) F Moser	3	5

Semifinals
1	(Spain) R Ramírez Hidalgo (Spain) S Ventura	6	6
3	(Germany) D Gremelmayr (Germany) P Marx	2	4
(Germany) S Greul (Italy) A Motti	6	7
(Australia) P Luczak (Australia) J Sirianni	2	6^{5}

Finals
1	(Spain) R Ramírez Hidalgo (Spain) S Ventura	4	6	[10]
(Germany) S Greul (Italy) A Motti	6	1	[6]
