= 2012 Franken Challenge – Doubles =

Doubles
- 2012 Franken Challenge

Final
- Champions: (Spain) Arnau Brugués-Davi (Portugal) João Sousa
- Runners-up: (Australia) Rameez Junaid (India) Purav Raja
- Score: 7–5, 6–7^{(4–7)}, [11–9]

Events
Singles	Doubles
← 2011 ·	Franken Challenge	· 2013 →

Rameez Junaid and Frank Moser were the defending champions but Moser decided not to participate.
Junaid played alongside Purav Raja and reached the final but lost to Arnau Brugués-Davi and João Sousa 7–5, 6–7^{(4–7)}, [11–9].

== Seeds ==
1. (Germany) Martin Emmrich / (Germany) Michael Kohlmann (quarterfinals)
2. (Australia) Rameez Junaid / (India) Purav Raja (runners-up)
3. (Romania) Andrei Dăescu / (Romania) Florin Mergea (quarterfinals)
4. (Kazakhstan) Andrey Golubev / (Kazakhstan) Yuri Schukin (semifinals)

== Draw ==
=== Key ===
- Q = Qualifier
- WC = Wild card
- LL = Lucky loser
- Alt = Alternate
- SE = Special exempt
- PR = Protected ranking
- ITF = ITF entry
- JE = Junior exempt
- w/o = Walkover
- r = Retired
- d = Defaulted
- SR = Special ranking

=== Draw ===
First round
1	(Germany) M Emmrich (Germany) M Kohlmann	4	7	[10]
(Brazil) Rodrigo-Antonio Grilli (Colombia) C Salamanca	6	5	[6]
WC	(Brazil) A Ghem (Germany) K Krawietz	2	4
(Serbia) N Ćirić (Montenegro) G Tošić	6	6
3	(Romania) A Dăescu (Romania) F Mergea	6	6
WC	(Latvia) A Juška (Latvia) D Pavlovs	3	3
(Republic of Ireland) James Cluskey (Germany) A Satschko
(Spain) A Brugués-Davi (Portugal) J Sousa	w/o
(Czech Republic) D Lojda (Canada) P Polansky	7	6
(Germany) D Gremelmayr (Germany) S Greul	5	4
(France) D Guez (France) J Ouanna	3	3
4	(Kazakhstan) A Golubev (Kazakhstan) Y Schukin	6	6
(France) G Burquier (France) J Dasnières de Veigy	4	3
(Australia) Adam Hubble (New Zealand) J Statham	6	6
WC	(Germany) P Torebko (Germany) Holger Zühlsdorff-Pavlovic	2	1
2	(Australia) R Junaid (India) P Raja	6	6

Quarterfinals
1	(Germany) M Emmrich (Germany) M Kohlmann	6	3	[9]
(Serbia) N Ćirić (Montenegro) G Tošić	2	6	[11]
3	(Romania) A Dăescu (Romania) F Mergea	6	2	[8]
(Spain) A Brugués-Davi (Portugal) J Sousa	1	6	[10]
(Czech Republic) D Lojda (Canada) P Polansky	4	2
4	(Kazakhstan) A Golubev (Kazakhstan) Y Schukin	6	6
(Australia) Adam Hubble (New Zealand) J Statham	6^{6}	6	[8]
2	(Australia) R Junaid (India) P Raja	7^{8}	3	[10]

Semifinals
(Serbia) N Ćirić (Montenegro) G Tošić	7^{7}	6^{3}	[2]
(Spain) A Brugués-Davi (Portugal) J Sousa	6^{2}	7^{7}	[10]
4	(Kazakhstan) A Golubev (Kazakhstan) Y Schukin	7^{7}	4	[11]
2	(Australia) R Junaid (India) P Raja	6^{4}	6	[13]

Final
(Spain) A Brugués-Davi (Portugal) J Sousa	7	6^{4}	[11]
2	(Australia) R Junaid (India) P Raja	5	7^{7}	[9]
