= 2012 Franken Challenge – Singles =

Singles
- 2012 Franken Challenge

Final
- Champion: (Slovenia) Blaž Kavčič
- Runner-up: (Ukraine) Sergiy Stakhovsky
- Score: 6–3, 2–6, 6–2

Events
Singles	Doubles
← 2011 ·	Franken Challenge	· 2013 →

João Sousa was the defending champion.
Blaž Kavčič won the tournament by defeating Sergiy Stakhovsky 6–3, 2–6, 6–2 in the final.

== Seeds ==
1. (Ukraine) Sergiy Stakhovsky
2. (Slovenia) Blaž Kavčič (champion)
3. (Germany) Matthias Bachinger (second round)
4. (Germany) Daniel Brands (second round)
5. (Italy) Simone Bolelli (second round)
6. (Portugal) João Sousa (first round)
7. (Kazakhstan) Andrey Golubev (second round)
8. (Austria) Andreas Haider-Maurer (quarterfinals)

== Draw ==
=== Key ===
- Q = Qualifier
- WC = Wild card
- LL = Lucky loser
- Alt = Alternate
- SE = Special exempt
- PR = Protected ranking
- ITF = ITF entry
- JE = Junior exempt
- w/o = Walkover
- r = Retired
- d = Defaulted
- SR = Special ranking

=== Finals ===
Semifinals
1	(Ukraine) Sergiy Stakhovsky	7	6
(Spain) Arnau Brugués-Davi	5	3
(France) Maxime Teixeira	1	3
2	(Slovenia) Blaž Kavčič	6	6

Final
1	(Ukraine) Sergiy Stakhovsky	3	6	2
2	(Slovenia) Blaž Kavčič	6	2	6

=== Top half ===
First round
1	(Ukraine) S Stakhovsky	6	7^{7}
(Colombia) C Salamanca	2	6^{3}
(Germany) P Gojowczyk	2	6	6
(Serbia) N Ćirić	6	0	3
(France) J Ouanna	6	4	6
Q	(France) D Guez	3	6	4
WC	(Germany) K Krawietz	2	3
8	(Austria) A Haider-Maurer	6	6
3	(Germany) M Bachinger	6	6
(Australia) J Duckworth	3	2
Q	(Germany) Marc Sieber	6	4	5^{5}
(Germany) S Greul	4	6	7
WC	(Switzerland) A Ritschard	2	2
(Spain) A Brugués-Davi	6	6
(France) G Burquier	4	6	3
7	(Kazakhstan) A Golubev	6	1	6

Second round
1	(Ukraine) S Stakhovsky	3	6	7
(Germany) P Gojowczyk	6	4	5
(France) J Ouanna	7^{7}	4	2
8	(Austria) A Haider-Maurer	6^{5}	6	6
3	(Germany) M Bachinger	6	5	4
(Germany) S Greul	3	7	6
(Spain) A Brugués-Davi	6	6
7	(Kazakhstan) A Golubev	3	2

Quarterfinals
1	(Ukraine) S Stakhovsky	6	6
8	(Austria) A Haider-Maurer	4	3
(Germany) S Greul	3	6	3
(Spain) A Brugués-Davi	6	3	6

Semifinals
1	(Ukraine) S Stakhovsky	7	6
(Spain) A Brugués-Davi	5	3

=== Bottom half ===
First round
5	(Italy) S Bolelli	6	6
(France) F Serra	2	2
(Czech Republic) D Lojda	6	6
WC	(Germany) Maximilian Marterer	2	1
(Canada) P Polansky	4	6	3
(France) M Teixeira	6	1	6
(Germany) P Torebko	5	6^{3}
4	(Germany) D Brands	7	7
6	(Portugal) J Sousa	3	6^{4}
Q	(Kazakhstan) Y Schukin	6	7
(Czech Republic) I Minář	5	r
(France) J Dasnières de Veigy	7
WC	(Germany) Jan-Lennard Struff	7	6
(China) Z Zhang	5	3
Q	(Brazil) A Ghem	4	2
2	(Slovenia) B Kavčič	6	6

Second round
5	(Italy) S Bolelli	2	4
(Czech Republic) D Lojda	6	6
(France) M Teixeira	6	7^{7}
4	(Germany) D Brands	4	6^{3}
Q	(Kazakhstan) Y Schukin	3	2
(France) J Dasnières de Veigy	6	6
WC	(Germany) Jan-Lennard Struff	5	5
2	(Slovenia) B Kavčič	7	7

Quarterfinals
(Czech Republic) D Lojda	6	6^{3}	2
(France) M Teixeira	4	7^{7}	6
(France) J Dasnières de Veigy	4	3
2	(Slovenia) B Kavčič	6	6

Semifinals
(France) M Teixeira	1	3
2	(Slovenia) B Kavčič	6	6
