= 2012 ATP Roller Open =

- Date: 10–16 September
- Edition: 1st
- Surface: Hard
- Location: Pétange, Luxembourg

Champions

Singles
- (Germany) Tobias Kamke

Doubles
- (Germany) Christopher Kas / (Belgium) Dick Norman
ATP Roller Open	· 2013 →

The 2012 ATP Roller Open was a professional tennis tournament played on hard courts. It was the first edition of the tournament which was part of the 2012 ATP Challenger Tour. It took place in Pétange, Luxembourg between 10 and 16 September 2012.

== Singles main-draw entrants ==
=== Seeds ===
Country	Player	Rank^{1}	Seed
LUX	Gilles Müller	53	1
EST	Jürgen Zopp	80	2
LTU	Ričardas Berankis	88	3
GER	Tobias Kamke	88	4
FRA	Édouard Roger-Vasselin	104	5
ARG	Horacio Zeballos	108	6
FRA	Florent Serra	116	7
CRO	Ivan Dodig	118	8

- ^{1} Rankings are as of August 27, 2012.

=== Other entrants ===
The following players received wildcards into the singles main draw:

- (Germany) Tobias Kamke
- (France) Paul-Henri Mathieu
- (Luxembourg) Maciej Najfeld
- (Luxembourg) Ugo Nastasi

The following players received entry from the qualifying draw:

- (Luxembourg) Gilles Kremer
- (France) Jules Marie
- (France) Elie Rousset
- (France) Gauthier Stauffer

== Champions ==
=== Singles ===
- (Germany) Tobias Kamke def. (France) Paul-Henri Mathieu, 7–6^{(9–7)}, 6–4

=== Doubles ===
- (Germany) Christopher Kas / (Belgium) Dick Norman def. (United Kingdom) Jamie Murray / (Brazil) André Sá, 2–6, 6–2, [10–8]
