= 2013 Franken Challenge =

- Date: 4 – 10 June
- Edition: 26th
- Draw: 32S / 16D
- Prize money: €42,000+H
- Surface: Clay
- Location: Fürth, Germany

Champions

Singles
- (Portugal) João Sousa

Doubles
- (Australia) Colin Ebelthite / (Australia) Rameez Junaid
← 2012 ·	Franken Challenge	· 2014 →

The 2013 Franken Challenge was a professional tennis tournament played on clay courts. It was the 26th edition of the tournament which was part of the 2013 ATP Challenger Tour. It took place in Fürth, Germany between 3 and 9 June 2013.

== Singles main draw entrants ==
=== Seeds ===
Country	Player	Rank^{1}	Seed
SVN	Blaž Kavčič	104	1
AUT	Andreas Haider-Maurer	105	2
USA	Wayne Odesnik	113	3
POR	João Sousa	119	4
GER	Simon Greul	139	5
GER	Mischa Zverev	142	6
COL	Alejandro González	147	7
FRA	Josselin Ouanna	157	8

- ^{1} Rankings are as of May 27, 2013.

=== Other entrants ===
The following players received wildcards into the singles main draw:

- (Germany) Andreas Beck
- (Germany) Peter Heller
- (Germany) Robin Kern
- (Germany) Kevin Krawietz

The following player received entry using a protected ranking:

- (France) Laurent Rochette

The following players received entry from the qualifying draw:

- (Japan) Taro Daniel
- (Italy) Lorenzo Giustino
- (Germany) Peter Torebko
- (United Kingdom) Alexander Ward

== Doubles main draw entrants ==
=== Seeds ===
Country	Player	Country	Player	Rank^{1}	Seed
GER	Philipp Marx	ROU	Florin Mergea	138	1
USA	James Cerretani	BRA	Marcelo Demoliner	144	2
IND	Purav Raja	IND	Divij Sharan	217	3
TPE	Lee Hsin-han	TPE	Peng Hsien-yin	246	4

- ^{1} Rankings are as of May 27, 2013.

=== Other entrants ===
The following pairs received wildcards into the doubles main draw:

- (Austria) Andreas Haider-Maurer / (Austria) Mario Haider-Maurer
- (Germany) Kevin Krawietz / (Germany) Dominik Schulz
- (Germany) Gero Kretschmer / (Germany) Alexander Satschko

The following pairs received as alternates into the doubles main draw:

- (United States) Christian Harrison / (New Zealand) Michael Venus
- (Brazil) Leonardo Kirche / (Bosnia and Herzegovina) Aldin Šetkić

== Champions ==
=== Singles ===
- (Portugal) João Sousa def. (United States) Wayne Odesnik, 3–6, 6–3, 6–4

=== Doubles ===
- (Australia) Colin Ebelthite / (Australia) Rameez Junaid def. (United States) Christian Harrison / (New Zealand) Michael Venus, 6–4, 7–5
