= 2013 ATP Roller Open – Singles =

Singles
- 2013 ATP Roller Open

Final
- Champion: (Germany) Tobias Kamke
- Runner-up: (France) Paul-Henri Mathieu
- Score: 1–6, 6–3, 7–5

Events
Singles	Doubles
← 2012 ·	ATP Roller Open	· 2014 →

Tobias Kamke was the defending champion and successfully defended his title, defeating Paul-Henri Mathieu in the final, 1–6, 6–3, 7–5.

== Seeds ==
1. (France) Kenny de Schepper (first round)
2. (France) Nicolas Mahut (first round)
3. (Germany) Benjamin Becker (quarterfinals)
4. (Germany) Tobias Kamke (champion)
5. (Germany) Jan-Lennard Struff (quarterfinals)
6. (France) Paul-Henri Mathieu (final)
7. (Lithuania) Ričardas Berankis (quarterfinals)
8. (Kazakhstan) Andrey Golubev (second round)

== Draw ==
=== Key ===
- Q = Qualifier
- WC = Wild card
- LL = Lucky loser
- Alt = Alternate
- SE = Special exempt
- PR = Protected ranking
- ITF = ITF entry
- JE = Junior exempt
- w/o = Walkover
- r = Retired
- d = Defaulted
- SR = Special ranking

=== Finals ===
Semifinals
(Belgium) Niels Desein	3	6	4
6	(France) Paul-Henri Mathieu	6	1	6
4	(Germany) Tobias Kamke	7^{7}	3	6
(Estonia) Jürgen Zopp	6^{2}	6	3

Final
6	(France) Paul-Henri Mathieu	6	3	5
4	(Germany) Tobias Kamke	1	6	7

=== Top half ===
First round
1	(France) K de Schepper	4	4
(Slovakia) K Beck	6	6
(Italy) R Ghedin	2	1
(Belgium) N Desein	6	6
Alt	(Germany) R Kern	6^{3}	3
(Russia) V Rudnev	7^{7}	6
WC	(Luxembourg) Joe Hatto	0	0
5	(Germany) J-L Struff	6	6
3	(Germany) B Becker	6	6
WC	(Luxembourg) U Nastasi	0	0
(France) J Ouanna	7^{7}	6
Q	(Croatia) F Veger	6^{1}	1
(Germany) T Pütz	6	1
Q	(France) A Sidorenko	4	0^{r}
Q	(Republic of Ireland) S Barry	2	4
6	(France) P-H Mathieu	6	6

Second round
(Slovakia) K Beck	6^{4}	3
(Belgium) N Desein	7^{7}	6
(Russia) V Rudnev	5	3
5	(Germany) J-L Struff	7	6
3	(Germany) B Becker	2	6	4
(France) J Ouanna	6	1	1^{r}
(Germany) T Pütz	2	1
6	(France) P-H Mathieu	6	6

Quarterfinals
(Belgium) N Desein	3	7	7^{7}
5	(Germany) J-L Struff	6	5	6^{3}
3	(Germany) B Becker	2	7^{7}	4
6	(France) P-H Mathieu	6	6^{5}	6

Semifinals
(Belgium) N Desein	3	6	4
6	(France) P-H Mathieu	6	1	6

=== Bottom half ===
First round
7	(Lithuania) R Berankis	6	6
(Belgium) Y Mertens	3	2
(France) Jules Marie	5	4
(Hungary) M Fucsovics	7	6
(Uzbekistan) F Dustov	6	6
(Italy) S Caruso	3	3
Q	(France) C Lestienne	3	2
4	(Germany) T Kamke	6	6
8	(Kazakhstan) A Golubev	6	6
(Kazakhstan) E Korolev	2	0
WC	(Switzerland) S Bohli	6	6
WC	(Luxembourg) Gilles Kremer	2	2
(Estonia) J Zopp	6	6
(Austria) M Neuchrist	3	1
(Germany) Stefan Seifert	1	6	6
2	(France) N Mahut	6	3	2

Second round
7	(Lithuania) R Berankis	7^{7}	6
(Hungary) M Fucsovics	6^{5}	1
(Uzbekistan) F Dustov	3	7	1^{r}
4	(Germany) T Kamke	6	5	4
8	(Kazakhstan) A Golubev	6^{4}	4
WC	(Switzerland) S Bohli	7^{7}	6
(Estonia) J Zopp	7^{7}	6
(Germany) S Seifert	6^{3}	3

Quarterfinals
7	(Lithuania) R Berankis	5	0
4	(Germany) T Kamke	7	6
WC	(Switzerland) S Bohli	3	3
(Estonia) J Zopp	6	6

Semifinals
4	(Germany) T Kamke	7^{7}	3	6
(Estonia) J Zopp	6^{2}	6	3
