= 2013 Franken Challenge – Doubles =

Doubles
- 2013 Franken Challenge

Final
- Champions: (Australia) Colin Ebelthite (Australia) Rameez Junaid
- Runners-up: (United States) Christian Harrison (New Zealand) Michael Venus
- Score: 6–4, 7–5

Events
| Singles | Doubles |
| ← 2012 · | Franken Challenge | · 2014 → |

Arnau Brugués-Davi and João Sousa were the defending champions but Arnau decided not to participate.
Sousa played alongside Frank Moser but lost in the first round.
Colin Ebelthite and Rameez Junaid won the title after defeating Christian Harrison and Michael Venus 6–4, 7–5 in the final.

== Seeds ==
1. (Germany) Philipp Marx / (Romania) Florin Mergea (quarterfinals)
2. (United States) James Cerretani / (Brazil) Marcelo Demoliner (quarterfinals)
3. (India) Purav Raja / (India) Divij Sharan (quarterfinals)
4. (Chinese Taipei) Lee Hsin-han / (Chinese Taipei) Peng Hsien-yin (quarterfinals)

== Draw ==
=== Key ===
- Q = Qualifier
- WC = Wild card
- LL = Lucky loser
- Alt = Alternate
- SE = Special exempt
- PR = Protected ranking
- ITF = ITF entry
- JE = Junior exempt
- w/o = Walkover
- r = Retired
- d = Defaulted
- SR = Special ranking

=== Draw ===
First round
1 | (Germany) P Marx (Romania) F Mergea | 6 | 7
(Germany) S Greul (Germany) B Knittel | 3 | 5
(Germany) F Moser (Portugal) J Sousa | 3 | 3
(Australia) C Ebelthite (Australia) R Junaid | 6 | 6
4 | (Chinese Taipei) Lee H-h (Chinese Taipei) Peng H-y | 6 | 6
WC | (Germany) G Kretschmer (Germany) A Satschko | 2 | 1
(Argentina) F Argüello (Uruguay) A Behar | 6 | 6
WC | (Austria) A Haider-Maurer (Austria) Mario Haider-Maurer | 2 | 4
Alt | (Brazil) L Kirche (Bosnia and Herzegovina) A Šetkić | 3 | 6^{5}
WC | (Germany) K Krawietz (Germany) D Schulz | 6 | 7^{7}
(Slovakia) A Martin (Chile) H Podlipnik-Castillo | 3 | 6 | [8]
3 | (India) P Raja (India) D Sharan | 6 | 1 | [10]
Alt | (United States) C Harrison (New Zealand) M Venus | 6 | 4 | [10]
(Colombia) A González (New Zealand) A Sitak | 2 | 6 | [8]
(United States) W Odesnik (France) M Teixeira | 4 | 4
2 | (United States) J Cerretani (Brazil) M Demoliner | 6 | 6

Quarterfinals
1 | (Germany) P Marx (Romania) F Mergea | 6^{4} | 3
(Australia) C Ebelthite (Australia) R Junaid | 7^{7} | 6
4 | (Chinese Taipei) Lee H-h (Chinese Taipei) Peng H-y | 3 | 6 | [9]
(Argentina) F Argüello (Uruguay) A Behar | 6 | 0 | [11]
WC | (Germany) K Krawietz (Germany) D Schulz | 7 | 6
3 | (India) P Raja (India) D Sharan | 5 | 3
Alt | (United States) C Harrison (New Zealand) M Venus | 6 | 6
2 | (United States) J Cerretani (Brazil) M Demoliner | 4 | 2

Semifinals
(Australia) C Ebelthite (Australia) R Junaid | 6 | 6
(Argentina) F Argüello (Uruguay) A Behar | 0 | 4
WC | (Germany) K Krawietz (Germany) D Schulz | 2 | 6 | [5]
Alt | (United States) C Harrison (New Zealand) M Venus | 6 | 1 | [10]

Final
(Australia) C Ebelthite (Australia) R Junaid | 6 | 7
Alt | (United States) C Harrison (New Zealand) M Venus | 4 | 5
