= 2012 ATP Roller Open – Singles =

Singles
- 2012 ATP Roller Open

Final
- Champion: (Germany) Tobias Kamke
- Runner-up: (France) Paul-Henri Mathieu
- Score: 7–6^{(9–7)}, 6–4

Events
Singles	Doubles
← 2011 ·	ATP Roller Open	· 2013 →

Tobias Kamke won the title, defeating Paul-Henri Mathieu 7–6^{(9–7)}, 6–4 in the final.

== Seeds ==
1. (Luxembourg) Gilles Müller (second round)
2. (Estonia) Jürgen Zopp (semifinals)
3. (Lithuania) Ričardas Berankis (second round)
4. (Germany) Tobias Kamke (champion)
5. (France) Édouard Roger-Vasselin (semifinals)
6. (Argentina) Horacio Zeballos (quarterfinals)
7. (France) Florent Serra (first round)
8. (Croatia) Ivan Dodig (quarterfinals)

== Draw ==
=== Key ===
- Q = Qualifier
- WC = Wild card
- LL = Lucky loser
- Alt = Alternate
- SE = Special exempt
- PR = Protected ranking
- ITF = ITF entry
- JE = Junior exempt
- w/o = Walkover
- r = Retired
- d = Defaulted
- SR = Special ranking

=== Finals ===
Semifinals
5	(France) Édouard Roger-Vasselin	4	6^{4}
4/WC	(Germany) Tobias Kamke	6	7^{7}
WC	(France) Paul-Henri Mathieu	7^{7}	6
2	(Estonia) Jürgen Zopp	6^{2}	2

Final
4/WC	(Germany) Tobias Kamke	7^{9}	6
WC	(France) Paul-Henri Mathieu	6^{7}	4

=== Top half ===
First round
1	(Luxembourg) G Müller	6	6
WC	(Luxembourg) U Nastasi	4	1
Q	(France) Gauthier Stauffer	0	2
(Belgium) N Desein	6	6
(Lithuania) L Grigelis	4	4
(Switzerland) A Bossel	6	6
(Russia) E Kirillov	5	6^{2}
5	(France) É Roger-Vasselin	7	7^{7}
4/WC	(Germany) T Kamke	6	5	6
(Germany) Moritz Baumann	2	7	2
(France) V Millot	1	5
(United Kingdom) J Goodall	6	7
Q	(France) Jules Marie	4	3
(Czech Republic) J Minář	6	6
(France) J Ouanna	4	3
8	(Croatia) I Dodig	6	6

Second round
1	(Luxembourg) G Müller	4	4
(Belgium) N Desein	6	6
(Switzerland) A Bossel	3	6	3
5	(France) É Roger-Vasselin	6	4	6
4/WC	(Germany) T Kamke	6	7^{7}
(United Kingdom) J Goodall	2	6^{3}
(Czech Republic) J Minář	6	2	6^{3}
8	(Croatia) I Dodig	2	6	7^{7}

Quarterfinals
(Belgium) N Desein	5	4
5	(France) É Roger-Vasselin	7	6
4/WC	(Germany) T Kamke	6	5	6
8	(Croatia) I Dodig	4	7	4

Semifinals
5	(France) É Roger-Vasselin	4	6^{4}
4/WC	(Germany) T Kamke	6	7^{7}

=== Bottom half ===
First round
7	(France) F Serra	3	3
WC	(France) P-H Mathieu	6	6
Q	(France) Elie Rousset	0	2
(France) P-H Herbert	6	6
(Czech Republic) J Hernych	6	6
WC	(Luxembourg) Maciej Najfeld	0	0
(France) K de Schepper	4	2
3	(Lithuania) R Berankis	6	6
6	(Argentina) H Zeballos	6	6
Q	(Luxembourg) Gilles Kremer	1	2
(Belgium) M Authom	7^{7}
(Serbia) I Bozoljac	6^{5}	r
(Denmark) F Nielsen	3	6	6
(France) J Eysseric	6	4	1
(Germany) A Begemann	3	0
2	(Estonia) J Zopp	6	6

Second round
WC	(France) P-H Mathieu	6	6
(France) P-H Herbert	2	1
(Czech Republic) J Hernych	5	7	6
3	(Lithuania) R Berankis	7	5	2
6	(Argentina) H Zeballos	4	6	6
(Belgium) M Authom	6	3	2
(Denmark) F Nielsen	6^{2}	2
2	(Estonia) J Zopp	7^{7}	6

Quarterfinals
WC	(France) P-H Mathieu	7^{7}	7^{8}
(Czech Republic) J Hernych	6^{5}	6^{6}
6	(Argentina) H Zeballos	6^{2}	3
2	(Estonia) J Zopp	7^{7}	6

Semifinals
WC	(France) P-H Mathieu	7^{7}	6
2	(Estonia) J Zopp	6^{2}	2
