= 2016 Franken Challenge =

- Date: 30 May – 5 June
- Edition: 29th
- Draw: 32S / 16D
- Prize money: €42,000
- Surface: Clay
- Location: Fürth, Germany

Champions

Singles
- (Moldova) Radu Albot

Doubles
- (Argentina) Facundo Argüello / (Venezuela) Roberto Maytín
← 2015 ·	Franken Challenge	· 2017 →

The 2016 Franken Challenge is a professional tennis tournament, played on clay courts. It is the 29th edition of the tournament which is part of the 2016 ATP Challenger Tour. It takes place in Fürth, Germany between 30 May and 5 June 2016.

== Singles main-draw entrants ==
=== Seeds ===
Country	Player	Rank^{1}	Seed
TUN	Malek Jaziri	72	1
JPN	Taro Daniel	93	2
ESP	Albert Montañés	98	3
GER	Jan-Lennard Struff	101	4
ESP	Roberto Carballés Baena	114	5
ITA	Thomas Fabbiano	117	6
NED	Thiemo de Bakker	120	7
SVK	Jozef Kovalík	125	8

- ^{1} Rankings as of May 23, 2016.

=== Other entrants ===
The following players received wildcards into the singles main draw:

- (Germany) Matthias Bachinger
- (Germany) Maximilian Marterer
- (Germany) Daniel Masur
- (Germany) Paul Wörner

The following player received entry as a protected ranking into the singles main draw:

- (Germany) Julian Reister

The following player received entry as an alternate into the singles main draw:

- (Switzerland) Henri Laaksonen

The following players received entry from the qualifying draw:

- (Slovenia) Blaž Rola
- (Belgium) Arthur De Greef
- (Brazil) Caio Zampieri
- (Italy) Lorenzo Sonego

The following player received entry as a lucky loser:

- (Austria) Dennis Novak

== Champions ==
=== Singles ===
- (Moldova) Radu Albot def. (Germany) Jan-Lennard Struff, 6–3, 6–4

=== Doubles ===
- (Argentina) Facundo Argüello / (Venezuela) Roberto Maytín def. (Slovakia) Andrej Martin / (Austria) Tristan-Samuel Weissborn, 6–3, 6–4
