= 2013 ATP Roller Open – Doubles =

Doubles
- 2013 ATP Roller Open

Final
- Champions: (United Kingdom) Ken Skupski (United Kingdom) Neal Skupski
- Runners-up: (Germany) Benjamin Becker (Germany) Tobias Kamke
- Score: 6–3, 6–7^{(5–7)}, [10–7]

Events
Singles	Doubles
← 2012 ·	ATP Roller Open	· 2014 →

Christopher Kas and Dick Norman were the defending champion, but Norman chose to compete.
Kas chose to compete with Paul Hanley, but they lost in the first round to Niels Desein and Tim Pütz.

Ken and Neal Skupski won the title, defeating Benjamin Becker and Tobias Kamke in the final, 6–3, 6–7^{(5–7)}, [10–7].

== Seeds ==
1. (Australia) Paul Hanley / (Germany) Christopher Kas (first round)
2. (United States) Nicholas Monroe / (Germany) Simon Stadler (first round)
3. (India) Purav Raja / (India) Divij Sharan (first round)
4. (United Kingdom) Ken Skupski / (United Kingdom) Neal Skupski (champions)

== Draw ==
=== Key ===
- Q = Qualifier
- WC = Wild card
- LL = Lucky loser
- Alt = Alternate
- SE = Special exempt
- PR = Protected ranking
- ITF = ITF entry
- JE = Junior exempt
- w/o = Walkover
- r = Retired
- d = Defaulted
- SR = Special ranking

=== Draw ===
First round
1	(Australia) P Hanley (Germany) C Kas	6^{6}	6	[8]
(Belgium) N Desein (Germany) T Pütz	7^{8}	4	[10]
(Slovakia) K Beck (Netherlands) S Groen	1	7^{7}	[8]
(Belarus) A Bury (Uzbekistan) F Dustov	6	6^{4}	[10]
4	(United Kingdom) K Skupski (United Kingdom) N Skupski	6	6
WC	(France) Cedric Frenevello (Luxembourg) Sacha Thoma	0	1
(Kazakhstan) A Golubev (France) A Sidorenko	6	6^{5}	[4]
WC	(France) D Descloix (Luxembourg) U Nastasi	4	7	[10]
(France) K de Schepper (France) N Mahut	4	5
(Italy) R Ghedin (Italy) C Grassi	6	7
(Austria) M Neuchrist (Estonia) J Zopp	6	6
3	(India) P Raja (India) D Sharan	3	3
WC	(Armenia) Ashot Mkrtchyan (France) Joris Pipere	0	0
(Germany) B Becker (Germany) T Kamke	6	6
(Lithuania) R Berankis (Belarus) S Betov	6	6
2	(United States) N Monroe (Germany) S Stadler	3	0

Quarterfinals
(Belgium) N Desein (Germany) T Pütz	7^{7}	6
(Belarus) A Bury (Uzbekistan) F Dustov	6^{5}	2
4	(United Kingdom) K Skupski (United Kingdom) N Skupski	6	6
WC	(France) D Descloix (Luxembourg) U Nastasi	2	1
(Italy) R Ghedin (Italy) C Grassi	4	6	[10]
(Austria) M Neuchrist (Estonia) J Zopp	6	4	[7]
(Germany) B Becker (Germany) T Kamke	3	6	[10]
(Lithuania) R Berankis (Belarus) S Betov	6	2	[7]

Semifinals
(Belgium) N Desein (Germany) T Pütz	6^{4}	6^{3}
4	(United Kingdom) K Skupski (United Kingdom) N Skupski	7^{7}	7^{7}
(Italy) R Ghedin (Italy) C Grassi	4	2
(Germany) B Becker (Germany) T Kamke	6	6

Final
4	(United Kingdom) K Skupski (United Kingdom) N Skupski	6	6^{5}	[10]
(Germany) B Becker (Germany) T Kamke	3	7^{7}	[7]
