= 2015 Franken Challenge – Singles =

Singles
- 2015 Franken Challenge

Final
- Champions: (Japan) Taro Daniel
- Runners-up: (Spain) Albert Montañés
- Score: 6–3, 6–0

Events
Singles	Doubles
- Franken Challenge

Tobias Kamke was the defending champion, but lost in the first round to Christian Lindell.

Taro Daniel won the tournament defeating Albert Montañés in the final, 6–3, 6–0.

== Seeds ==
1. (Spain) Albert Ramos-Viñolas (semifinals)
2. (Slovenia) Blaž Rola (semifinals)
3. (Belgium) Kimmer Coppejans (first round)
4. (Germany) Tobias Kamke (first round)
5. (Australia) John Millman (first round, retired)
6. (Netherlands) Thiemo de Bakker (first round)
7. (Spain) Daniel Muñoz de la Nava (first round)
8. (Argentina) Horacio Zeballos (quarterfinals)

== Draw ==
Key

- Q = Qualifier
- WC = Wild card
- LL = Lucky loser
- Alt = Alternate
- ITF = ITF entry
- PR = Protected ranking
- SR = Special ranking
- SE = Special exempt
- JE = Junior exempt
- JR = Junior Accelerator Programme entrant
- CO = College Accelerator Programme entrant
- NG = Next Gen Accelerator Program entrant
- w/o = Walkover
- r = Retired
- d = Defaulted

=== Finals ===
Semifinals
1	(Spain) Albert Ramos-Viñolas	2	3
(Spain) Albert Montañés	6	6
(Japan) Taro Daniel	6	6
2	(Slovenia) Blaž Rola	4	0

Final
(Spain) Albert Montañés	3	0
(Japan) Taro Daniel	6	6

=== Top half ===
First round
1	(Spain) A Ramos-Viñolas	6	2
(Belgium) G Gigounon	2	1^{r}
WC	(Germany) D Brands	3	3
(Ecuador) G Lapentti	6	6
(Spain) R Ramírez Hidalgo	4	6^{4}
Alt	(Canada) F Dancevic	6	7^{7}
(Spain) I Cervantes	6	6
6	(Netherlands) T de Bakker	0	3
4	(Germany) T Kamke	6	4	5
(Sweden) C Lindell	1	6	7
WC	(Germany) F Mayer	3	1
(Spain) A Montañés	6	6
(Sweden) E Ymer	6	6
(Germany) P Gojowczyk	1	4
Q	(Ecuador) G Escobar	6	3	6
7	(Spain) D Muñoz de la Nava	4	6	1

Second round
1	(Spain) A Ramos-Viñolas	7^{7}	6
(Ecuador) G Lapentti	6^{0}	2
Alt	(Canada) F Dancevic	3	3
(Spain) I Cervantes	6	6
(Sweden) C Lindell	2	0
(Spain) A Montañés	6	6
(Sweden) E Ymer	6	6
Q	(Ecuador) G Escobar	1	2

Quarterfinals
1	(Spain) A Ramos-Viñolas	7	6
(Spain) I Cervantes	5	4
(Spain) A Montañés	6	1	7^{7}
(Sweden) E Ymer	4	6	6^{5}

Semifinals
1	(Spain) A Ramos-Viñolas	2	3
(Spain) A Montañés	6	6

=== Bottom half ===
First round
8	(Argentina) H Zeballos	6	6
(Romania) A Ungur	4	0
Q	(Spain) J Samper-Montaña	3	7	3
(Austria) G Melzer	6	5	6
(Japan) T Daniel	6	6
WC	(Germany) J Härteis	1	2
Q	(Germany) K Krawietz	6	1	7
3	(Belgium) K Coppejans	4	6	5
5	(Australia) J Millman	4	r
Q	(Italy) L Giustino	6
(Russia) E Donskoy	6^{1}	4
(Argentina) R Olivo	7^{7}	6
WC	(Germany) M Marterer	7	6
(Germany) A Beck	5	1
(France) V Millot	6	5	4
2	(Slovenia) B Rola	2	7	6

Second round
8	(Argentina) H Zeballos	6	6
(Austria) G Melzer	3	2
(Japan) T Daniel	5	6	6
Q	(Germany) K Krawietz	7	3	1
Q	(Italy) L Giustino	6	6
(Argentina) R Olivo	2	4
WC	(Germany) M Marterer	3	5
2	(Slovenia) B Rola	6	7

Quarterfinals
8	(Argentina) H Zeballos	4	4
(Japan) T Daniel	6	6
Q	(Italy) L Giustino	5	1
2	(Slovenia) B Rola	7	6

Semifinals
(Japan) T Daniel	6	6
2	(Slovenia) B Rola	4	0
