= 2010 Franken Challenge – Doubles =

Doubles
- 2010 Franken Challenge

Final
- Champions: (Jamaica) Dustin Brown (Australia) Rameez Junaid
- Runners-up: (Germany) Martin Emmrich (Australia) Joseph Sirianni
- Score: 6–3, 6–1

Events
Singles	Doubles
- Franken Challenge

Rubén Ramírez Hidalgo and Santiago Ventura were the defenders of title, but Ventura chose not to compete this year.
Ramírez Hidalgo partnered up with Rogier Wassen, but they lost to Martin Emmrich and Joseph Sirianni in the semifinals.
Dustin Brown and Rameez Junaid won in the final 6–3, 6–1, against Emmrich and Sirianni.

== Seeds ==
The top two seeds receive a bye into the quarterfinals.

1. (Spain) Rubén Ramírez Hidalgo / (Netherlands) Rogier Wassen (semifinals)
2. (Jamaica) Dustin Brown / (Australia) Rameez Junaid (champions)
3. (Germany) Martin Emmrich / (Australia) Joseph Sirianni (finals)
4. (Germany) Frank Moser / (Spain) Gabriel Trujillo Soler (quarterfinals)

== Draw ==
Key

- Q = Qualifier
- WC = Wild card
- LL = Lucky loser
- Alt = Alternate
- ITF = ITF entry
- PR = Protected ranking
- SR = Special ranking
- SE = Special exempt
- JE = Junior exempt
- JR = Junior Accelerator Programme entrant
- CO = College Accelerator Programme entrant
- NG = Next Gen Accelerator Program entrant
- w/o = Walkover
- r = Retired
- d = Defaulted

=== Draw ===
First round
(Spain) C Poch-Gradin (Spain) P Santos	6	6
(Russia) K Kravchuk (Ukraine) I Sergeyev	3	4
3	(Germany) M Emmrich (Australia) J Sirianni	7	6
(South Africa) D Hume (Germany) J Zietsman	6^{4}	2
(Germany) D Kindlmann (Germany) M Zimmermann	6	6
(Chile) F Ríos (Chile) C Saavedra Corvalán	3	0
(Germany) D Brands (Croatia) L Zovko	6	6^{0}	[9]
(Belarus) U Ignatik (Slovakia) M Kližan	2	7	[11]
(Uzbekistan) F Dustov (Kazakhstan) M Kukushkin	3	6	[1]
4	(Germany) F Moser (Spain) G Trujillo Soler	6	1	[10]
(Netherlands) S Groen (Germany) C-M Stebe	6	4	[10]
(Finland) T Nieminen (Mexico) B Rodríguez	1	6	[6]

Quarterfinals
1	(Spain) R Ramírez Hidalgo (Netherlands) R Wassen	6	6
(Spain) C Poch-Gradin (Spain) P Santos	1	3
3	(Germany) M Emmrich (Australia) J Sirianni	6	6
(Germany) D Kindlmann (Germany) M Zimmermann	4	2
(Belarus) U Ignatik (Slovakia) M Kližan	1	6	[10]
4	(Germany) F Moser (Spain) G Trujillo Soler	6	4	[5]
(Netherlands) S Groen (Germany) C-M Stebe	6	3	[4]
2	(Jamaica) D Brown (Australia) R Junaid	2	6	[10]

Semifinals
1	(Spain) R Ramírez Hidalgo (Netherlands) R Wassen	2	2
3	(Germany) M Emmrich (Australia) J Sirianni	6	6
(Belarus) U Ignatik (Slovakia) M Kližan	6	1	[10]
2	(Jamaica) D Brown (Australia) R Junaid	4	6	[12]

Finals
3	(Germany) M Emmrich (Australia) J Sirianni	3	1
2	(Jamaica) D Brown (Australia) R Junaid	6	6
