= 2011 Franken Challenge – Doubles =

Doubles
- 2011 Franken Challenge

Final
- Champions: (Australia) Rameez Junaid (Germany) Frank Moser
- Runners-up: (Chile) Jorge Aguilar (Ecuador) Júlio César Campozano
- Score: 6–2, 6–7(2), [10–6]

Events
Singles	Doubles
- Franken Challenge

Dustin Brown and Rameez Junaid were the defending champions but Brown decided not to participate.
As a result, Junaid played alongside Frank Moser and this pair won the tournament, defeating Jorge Aguilar and Júlio César Campozano 6–2, 6–7(2), [10–6] in the final.

== Seeds ==
1. (Australia) Rameez Junaid / (Germany) Frank Moser (champions)
2. (Colombia) Robert Farah / (Latvia) Andis Juška (first round)
3. (Australia) Peter Luczak / (Italy) Alessandro Motti (quarterfinals)
4. (South Africa) Jeff Coetzee / (Sweden) Andreas Siljeström (semifinals)

== Draw ==
Key

- Q = Qualifier
- WC = Wild card
- LL = Lucky loser
- Alt = Alternate
- ITF = ITF entry
- PR = Protected ranking
- SR = Special ranking
- SE = Special exempt
- JE = Junior exempt
- JR = Junior Accelerator Programme entrant
- CO = College Accelerator Programme entrant
- NG = Next Gen Accelerator Program entrant
- w/o = Walkover
- r = Retired
- d = Defaulted

=== Draw ===
First round
1	(Australia) R Junaid (Germany) F Moser	6	6
WC	(Netherlands) S Groen (Germany) C-M Stebe	3	2
(Germany) D Kindlmann (Germany) M Zimmermann	w/o
(Germany) T Kamke (Germany) J Reister
3	(Australia) P Luczak (Italy) A Motti	6	6
WC	(Germany) P Gojowczyk (Germany) P Torebko	4	4
(Romania) M Copil (Australia) S Kadir	1	5
(France) G Burquier (France) R Jouan	6	7
(Germany) B Knittel (Germany) S Rieschick	6	6
(Spain) G Alcaide (Portugal) J Sousa	1	2
(Spain) R Bautista-Agut (Belarus) U Ignatik	3	2
4	(South Africa) J Coetzee (Sweden) A Siljeström	6	6
(Germany) S Greul (Germany) P Marx	6	6
WC	(United States) Trent Aaron (United States) Craig Schwartz	3	1
(Chile) J Aguilar (Ecuador) JC Campozano	6	6
2	(Colombia) R Farah (Latvia) A Juška	2	4

Quarterfinals
1	(Australia) R Junaid (Germany) F Moser	6	7
(Germany) D Kindlmann (Germany) M Zimmermann	3	6^{1}
3	(Australia) P Luczak (Italy) A Motti	4	5
(France) G Burquier (France) R Jouan	6	7
(Germany) B Knittel (Germany) S Rieschick	3	2
4	(South Africa) J Coetzee (Sweden) A Siljeström	6	6
(Germany) S Greul (Germany) P Marx	4	6	[9]
(Chile) J Aguilar (Ecuador) JC Campozano	6	3	[11]

Semifinals
1	(Australia) R Junaid (Germany) F Moser	6	6
(France) G Burquier (France) R Jouan	3	2
4	(South Africa) J Coetzee (Sweden) A Siljeström	6	1	[9]
(Chile) J Aguilar (Ecuador) JC Campozano	1	6	[11]

Final
1	(Australia) R Junaid (Germany) F Moser	6	6^{2}	[10]
(Chile) J Aguilar (Ecuador) JC Campozano	2	7	[6]
