= 2012 ATP Roller Open – Doubles =

Doubles
- 2012 ATP Roller Open

Final
- Champions: (Germany) Christopher Kas (Belgium) Dick Norman
- Runners-up: (United Kingdom) Jamie Murray (Brazil) André Sá
- Score: 2–6, 6–2, [10–8]

Events
Singles	Doubles
← 2011 ·	ATP Roller Open	· 2013 →

Christopher Kas and Dick Norman won the title, defeating Jamie Murray and André Sá 2–6, 6–2, [10–8] in the final.

== Seeds ==
1. (United Kingdom) Jamie Murray / (Brazil) André Sá (final)
2. (Germany) Christopher Kas / (Belgium) Dick Norman (champions)
3. (France) Pierre-Hugues Herbert / (France) Édouard Roger-Vasselin (semifinals)
4. (Germany) Andre Begemann / (Germany) Martin Emmrich (first round, withdrew)

== Draw ==
=== Key ===
- Q = Qualifier
- WC = Wild card
- LL = Lucky loser
- Alt = Alternate
- ITF = ITF entry
- PR = Protected ranking
- SR = Special ranking
- SE = Special exempt
- JE = Junior exempt
- JR = Junior Accelerator Programme entrant
- CO = College Accelerator Programme entrant
- NG = Next Gen Accelerator Program entrant
- w/o = Walkover
- r = Retired
- d = Defaulted

=== Draw ===
First round
1	(United Kingdom) J Murray (Brazil) A Sá	6	7^{7}
(Spain) Jordi Marsé-Vidri (Spain) C Poch-Gradin	2	6^{3}
(Lithuania) R Berankis (Lithuania) L Grigelis	6^{5}	7^{9}	[6]
WC	(Luxembourg) G Müller (Luxembourg) M Scheidweiler	7^{7}	6^{7}	[10]
4	(Germany) A Begemann (Germany) M Emmrich
(Australia) Alex Bucewicz (United Kingdom) J Goodall	w/o
(Republic of Ireland) J Cluskey (Estonia) J Zopp	6^{5}	6	[10]
(France) Jules Marie (France) Elie Rousset	7^{7}	1	[6]
(France) V Millot (France) J Ouanna	6	6
(France) Cedric Frenevello (Armenia) Ashot Mkrtchyan	4	1
(Belgium) N Desein (France) J Eysseric	6	3	[8]
3	(France) P-H Herbert (France) É Roger-Vasselin	3	6	[10]
(Serbia) I Bozoljac (Netherlands) S Groen	1	3
(Belgium) M Authom (Switzerland) A Bossel	6	6
(United States) Adham El-Effendi (United Kingdom) D Walsh	4	1
2	(Germany) C Kas (Belgium) D Norman	6	6

Quarterfinals
1	(United Kingdom) J Murray (Brazil) A Sá	4	6	[10]
WC	(Luxembourg) G Müller (Luxembourg) M Scheidweiler	6	3	[2]
(Australia) Alex Bucewicz (United Kingdom) J Goodall	6	6
(Republic of Ireland) J Cluskey (Estonia) J Zopp	4	1
(France) V Millot (France) J Ouanna	3	6	[2]
3	(France) P-H Herbert (France) É Roger-Vasselin	6	4	[10]
(Belgium) M Authom (Switzerland) A Bossel	3	7^{7}	[7]
2	(Germany) C Kas (Belgium) D Norman	6	6^{5}	[10]

Semifinals
1	(United Kingdom) J Murray (Brazil) A Sá	7^{7}	6
(Australia) Alex Bucewicz (United Kingdom) J Goodall	6^{3}	2
3	(France) P-H Herbert (France) É Roger-Vasselin	3	6	[10]
2	(Germany) C Kas (Belgium) D Norman	6	2	[12]

Final
1	(United Kingdom) J Murray (Brazil) A Sá	6	2	[8]
2	(Germany) C Kas (Belgium) D Norman	2	6	[10]
