= 2013 ATP Roller Open =

- Date: 9–15 September
- Edition: 2nd
- Surface: Hard
- Location: Pétange, Luxembourg

Champions

Singles
- (Germany) Tobias Kamke

Doubles
- (United Kingdom) Ken Skupski / (United Kingdom) Neal Skupski
← 2012 ·	ATP Roller Open	· 2014 →

The 2013 ATP Roller Open was a professional tennis tournament played on hard courts. It was the second edition of the tournament which was part of the 2013 ATP Challenger Tour. It took place in Pétange, Luxembourg between 9 and 15 September 2013.

== Singles main-draw entrants ==
=== Seeds ===
Country	Player	Rank^{1}	Seed
FRA	Kenny de Schepper	69	1
FRA	Nicolas Mahut	78	2
GER	Benjamin Becker	87	3
GER	Tobias Kamke	89	4
GER	Jan-Lennard Struff	96	5
FRA	Paul-Henri Mathieu	107	6
LTU	Ričardas Berankis	112	7
KAZ	Andrey Golubev	141	8

- ^{1} Rankings are as of August 26, 2013.

=== Other entrants ===
The following players received wildcards into the singles main draw:

- (Switzerland) Stéphane Bohli
- (Luxembourg) Gilles Kremer
- (Luxembourg) Ugo Nastasi
- (Luxembourg) Joe Hatto

The following players got into the singles main draw as an alternate:

- (Germany) Robin Kern

The following players received entry from the qualifying draw:

- (Croatia) Filip Veger
- (France) Alexandre Sidorenko
- (Republic of Ireland) Sam Barry
- (France) Constant Lestienne

== Champions ==
=== Singles ===
- (Germany) Tobias Kamke def. (France) Paul-Henri Mathieu, 1–6, 6–3, 7–5

=== Doubles ===
- (United Kingdom) Ken Skupski / (United Kingdom) Neal Skupski def. (Germany) Benjamin Becker / (Germany) Tobias Kamke, 6–3, 6–7^{(5–7)}, [10–7]
