= 2010 Franken Challenge – Singles =

Singles
- 2010 Franken Challenge

Final
- Champion: (Netherlands) Robin Haase
- Runner-up: (Germany) Tobias Kamke
- Score: 6–4, 6–2

Events
Singles	Doubles
- Franken Challenge

Peter Luczak was the defending champion, but he lost in the second round against Julian Reister.
Robin Haase won in the final 6–4, 6–2 against Tobias Kamke.

== Seeds ==
1. (Germany) Florian Mayer (second round)
2. (Germany) Simon Greul (semifinals)
3. (Australia) Peter Luczak (second round)
4. (Germany) Daniel Brands (second round)
5. (Jamaica) Dustin Brown (first round)
6. (Spain) Rubén Ramírez Hidalgo (second round)
7. (Spain) Óscar Hernández (first round)
8. (Kazakhstan) Mikhail Kukushkin (quarterfinals)

== Draw ==
Key

- Q = Qualifier
- WC = Wild card
- LL = Lucky loser
- Alt = Alternate
- ITF = ITF entry
- PR = Protected ranking
- SR = Special ranking
- SE = Special exempt
- JE = Junior exempt
- JR = Junior Accelerator Programme entrant
- CO = College Accelerator Programme entrant
- NG = Next Gen Accelerator Program entrant
- w/o = Walkover
- r = Retired
- d = Defaulted

=== Finals ===
Semifinals
(Netherlands) Robin Haase	6	7
(Germany) Julian Reister	2	5
(Germany) Tobias Kamke	6	4	6
2	(Germany) Simon Greul	4	6	4

Final
(Netherlands) Robin Haase	6	6
(Germany) Tobias Kamke	4	2

=== Top half ===
First round
1/WC	(Germany) F Mayer	4	6	6
ALT	(Australia) J Sirianni	6	2	4
(Netherlands) R Haase	6	6
(Czech Republic) I Minář	1	4
(Germany) D Kindlmann	7	6
ALT	(Romania) M Copil	5	2
Q	(Australia) R Junaid	6^{2}	2
6	(Spain) R Ramírez Hidalgo	7	6
3	(Australia) P Luczak	6	6
(Belarus) U Ignatik	4	4
Q	(Germany) J-L Struff	6	1	3
(Germany) J Reister	3	6	6
ALT	(Russia) K Kravchuk	6	7
ALT	(Spain) G Trujillo-Soler	2	6^{3}
(Slovakia) M Kližan	6^{6}	5
8	(Kazakhstan) M Kukushkin	7	7

Second round
1/WC	(Germany) F Mayer	5	4
(Netherlands) R Haase	7	6
(Germany) D Kindlmann	7	6
6	(Spain) R Ramírez Hidalgo	6^{4}	4
3	(Australia) P Luczak	2	6	1
(Germany) J Reister	6	4	6
ALT	(Russia) K Kravchuk	2	4
8	(Kazakhstan) M Kukushkin	6	6

Quarterfinals
(Netherlands) R Haase	6	6
(Germany) D Kindlmann	4	2
(Germany) J Reister	7	7
8	(Kazakhstan) M Kukushkin	6^{5}	6^{1}

Semifinals
(Netherlands) R Haase	6	7
(Germany) J Reister	2	5

=== Bottom half ===
First round
5	(Jamaica) D Brown	6	4	0
Q	(Italy) M Viola	4	6	6
LL	(Germany) M Sieber	1	1
(Germany) T Kamke	6	6
(France) V Millot	4	7	6
Q	(Germany) D Blömke	6	6^{4}	3
WC	(Germany) C-M Stebe	6^{6}	5
4	(Germany) D Bands	7	7
7	(Spain) Ó Hernández	5	3
(France) D Guez	7	6
WC	(Germany) M Zimmermann	6	6
WC	(Germany) M Bachinger	3	2
(Belgium) Y Mertens	4	6^{11}
ALT	(Spain) P Santos	6	7
(Ukraine) I Sergeyev	6	1	1
2	(Germany) S Greul	3	6	6

Second round
(Italy) M Viola	2	4
(Germany) T Kamke	6	6
(France) V Millot	6	2	6
4	(Germany) D Bands	4	6	3
(France) D Guez	6^{3}	1
WC	(Germany) M Zimmermann	7	6
ALT	(Spain) P Santos	6	4	0
2	(Germany) S Greul	3	6	6

Quarterfinals
(Germany) T Kamke	6	6
(France) V Millot	3	1
WC	(Germany) M Zimmermann	1	3
2	(Germany) S Greul	6	6

Semifinals
(Germany) T Kamke	6	4	6
2	(Germany) S Greul	4	6	4
