= 2009 Schickedanz Open =

- Date: 1–7 June 2009
- Edition: 23rd
- Location: Fürth, Germany

Champions

Singles
- (Australia) Peter Luczak

Doubles
- (Spain) Rubén Ramírez Hidalgo / (Spain) Santiago Ventura
← 2008 ·	Schickedanz Open	· 2010 →

The 2009 Schickedanz Open was a professional tennis tournament played on outdoor red clay courts. It was part of the 2009 ATP Challenger Tour. It took place in Fürth, Germany between 1 and 7 June 2009.

== Singles entrants ==
=== Seeds ===
Nationality	Player	Ranking*	Seeding
RUS	Teymuraz Gabashvili	72	1
AUT	Daniel Köllerer	77	2
GER	Simon Greul	111	3
CRO	Roko Karanušić	112	4
ESP	Santiago Ventura	122	5
COL	Santiago Giraldo	125	6
ESP	Rubén Ramírez Hidalgo	128	7
GER	Daniel Brands	129	8

- Rankings are as of May 25, 2009.

=== Other entrants ===
The following players received wildcards into the singles main draw:

- (Germany) Peter Gojowczyk
- (Germany) Jeremy Jahn
- (Austria) Daniel Köllerer
- (Germany) Marc Meigel

The following player received entry into the main draw as Special Exempt:

- (Jamaica) Dustin Brown
- (Germany) Florian Mayer

The following players received entry from the qualifying draw:

- (Netherlands) Thiemo de Bakker
- (Australia) Peter Luczak
- (Argentina) Eduardo Schwank
- (Republic of Ireland) Louk Sorensen

The following player received the lucky loser spot:

- (Spain) Miguel Ángel López Jaén

== Champions ==
=== Singles ===
(Australia) Peter Luczak def. (Argentina) Juan Pablo Brzezicki, 6–2, 6–0

=== Doubles ===
(Spain) Rubén Ramírez Hidalgo / (Spain) Santiago Ventura def. (Germany) Simon Greul / (Italy) Alessandro Motti, 4–6, 6–1, [10–6]
