= 2015 Franken Challenge – Doubles =

Doubles
- 2015 Franken Challenge
- 2014 Champions: (Spain) Gerard Granollers (Spain) Jordi Samper-Montaña

Events
Singles	Doubles
- Franken Challenge

Gerard Granollers and Jordi Samper-Montaña were the defending champions, but decided not to compete.

== Seeds ==
1. (Australia) Rameez Junaid / (Canada) Adil Shamasdin (first round)
2. (Argentina) Guillermo Durán / (Argentina) Horacio Zeballos
3. (Germany) Gero Kretschmer / (Germany) Alexander Satschko (semifinals)
4. (Venezuela) Roberto Maytín / (Mexico) Miguel Ángel Reyes-Varela (semifinals)

== Draw ==
Key

- Q = Qualifier
- WC = Wild card
- LL = Lucky loser
- Alt = Alternate
- ITF = ITF entry
- PR = Protected ranking
- SR = Special ranking
- SE = Special exempt
- JE = Junior exempt
- JR = Junior Accelerator Programme entrant
- CO = College Accelerator Programme entrant
- NG = Next Gen Accelerator Program entrant
- w/o = Walkover
- r = Retired
- d = Defaulted

First round
1	(Australia) R Junaid (Canada) A Shamasdin	6	6^{9}	[5]
(Spain) I Cervantes (Argentina) R Olivo	3	7^{7}	[10]
(Spain) D Muñoz de la Nava (Spain) R Ramírez Hidalgo	6	7
(France) V Millot (France) G Mina	4	5
3	(Germany) G Kretschmer (Germany) A Satschko	6	6
(Japan) T Daniel (Chinese Taipei) T-h Yang	4	1
(France) J Eysseric (Slovenia) B Rola	7	5	[9]
(Sweden) C Lindell (Sweden) E Ymer	5	7	[11]
(Romania) C Pavăl (Romania) A Ungur	6	3	[10]
(Serbia) I Bozoljac (Canada) F Dancevic	4	6	[6]
(Chinese Taipei) H-h Lee (Italy) A Motti	3	2
4	(Venezuela) R Maytín (Mexico) MA Reyes-Varela	6	6
WC	(Germany) J Härteis (Germany) Matthias Wunner	0	4
Alt	(El Salvador) M Arévalo (Ecuador) G Escobar	6	6
WC	(Germany) K Krawietz (Germany) M Marterer	2	3
2	(Argentina) G Durán (Argentina) H Zeballos	6	6

Quarterfinals
(Spain) I Cervantes (Argentina) R Olivo	7^{7}	6
(Spain) D Muñoz de la Nava (Spain) R Ramírez Hidalgo	6^{5}	4
3	(Germany) G Kretschmer (Germany) A Satschko	6	6
(Sweden) C Lindell (Sweden) E Ymer	2	0
(Romania) C Pavăl (Romania) A Ungur	4	6^{2}
4	(Venezuela) R Maytín (Mexico) MA Reyes-Varela	6	7^{7}
Alt	(El Salvador) M Arévalo (Ecuador) G Escobar	4	0
2	(Argentina) G Durán (Argentina) H Zeballos	6	6

Semifinals
(Spain) I Cervantes (Argentina) R Olivo	6	6^{8}	[13]
3	(Germany) G Kretschmer (Germany) A Satschko	2	7^{10}	[11]
4	(Venezuela) R Maytín (Mexico) MA Reyes-Varela	2	3
2	(Argentina) G Durán (Argentina) H Zeballos	6	6

Final
(Spain) I Cervantes (Argentina) R Olivo	1	3
2	(Argentina) G Durán (Argentina) H Zeballos	6	6
