= 2010 Franken Challenge =

Tennis tournament

- Date: 30 May – 6 June
- Edition: 24th
- Location: Fürth, Germany

Champions

Singles
- (Netherlands) Robin Haase

Doubles
- (Jamaica) Dustin Brown / (Australia) Rameez Junaid
← 2009 ·	Franken Challenge	· 2011 →

The 2010 Franken Challenge was a professional tennis tournament played on outdoor red clay courts. It was part of the 2010 ATP Challenger Tour. It took place in Fürth, Germany between 30 May – 6 June 2010.

== Singles main draw entrants ==
=== Seeds ===
Nationality	Player	Ranking*	Seeding
GER	Florian Mayer	51	1
GER	Simon Greul	64	2
AUS	Peter Luczak	71	3
GER	Daniel Brands	88	4
JAM	Dustin Brown	99	5
ESP	Rubén Ramírez Hidalgo	120	6
ESP	Óscar Hernández	121	7
KAZ	Mikhail Kukushkin	135	8

- Rankings are as of May 24, 2010.

=== Other entrants ===
The following players received wildcards into the singles main draw:

- (Germany) Matthias Bachinger
- (Germany) Florian Mayer
- (Germany) Cedrik-Marcel Stebe
- (Germany) Marcel Zimmermann

The following player received entry into the main draw as alternate:

- (Romania) Marius Copil
- (Russia) Konstantin Kravchuk
- (Spain) Pablo Santos
- (Australia) Joseph Sirianni
- (Spain) Gabriel Trujillo Soler

The following players received entry from the qualifying draw:

- (Germany) Dennis Blömke
- (Australia) Rameez Junaid
- (Germany) Jan-Lennard Struff
- (Italy) Matteo Viola

The following player received the lucky loser spot:

- (Germany) Marc Sieber

== Champions ==
=== Singles ===
(Netherlands) Robin Haase def. (Germany) Tobias Kamke, 6–4, 6–2

=== Doubles ===
(Jamaica) Dustin Brown / (Australia) Rameez Junaid def. (Germany) Martin Emmrich / (Australia) Joseph Sirianni, 6–3, 6–1
