= 2015 Franken Challenge =

- Date: 1 – 7 June
- Edition: 28th
- Draw: 32S / 16D
- Prize money: €42,000
- Surface: Clay
- Location: Fürth, Germany

Champions

Singles
- (Japan) Taro Daniel

Doubles
- (Argentina) Guillermo Durán / (Argentina) Horacio Zeballos
- Franken Challenge

The 2015 Franken Challenge was a professional tennis tournament played on clay courts. It was the 28th edition of the tournament which was part of the 2015 ATP Challenger Tour. It took place in Fürth, Germany between 1 and 7 June 2015.

== Singles main-draw entrants ==
=== Seeds ===
Country	Player	Rank^{1}	Seed
ESP	Albert Ramos Viñolas	63	1
SLO	Blaž Rola	97	2
BEL	Kimmer Coppejans	107	3
GER	Tobias Kamke	117	4
AUS	John Millman	132	5
NED	Thiemo de Bakker	133	6
ESP	Daniel Muñoz de la Nava	134	7
ARG	Horacio Zeballos	142	8

- ^{1} Rankings are as of May 25, 2015.

=== Other entrants ===
The following players received wildcards into the singles main draw:

- (Germany) Daniel Brands
- (Germany) Johannes Härteis
- (Germany) Maximilian Marterer
- (Germany) Florian Mayer

The following players received entry as an alternate into the singles main draw:

- (Canada) Frank Dancevic

The following players received entry from the qualifying draw:

- (Ecuador) Gonzalo Escobar
- (Italy) Lorenzo Giustino
- (Germany) Kevin Krawietz
- (Spain) Jordi Samper-Montaña

== Doubles main-draw entrants ==
=== Seeds ===
Country	Player	Country	Player	Rank^{1}	Seed
AUS	Rameez Junaid	CAN	Adil Shamasdin	125	1
ARG	Guillermo Durán	ARG	Horacio Zeballos	162	2
GER	Gero Kretschmer	GER	Alexander Satschko	196	3
VEN	Roberto Maytín	MEX	Miguel Ángel Reyes-Varela	227	4

- ^{1} Rankings are as of May 25, 2015.

=== Other entrants ===
The following pairs received wildcards into the doubles main draw:

- (Germany) Kevin Krawietz / (Germany) Maximilian Marterer
- (Germany) Steven Moneke / (Germany) Peter Torebko

The following players received entry as an alternate into the singles main draw:

- (El Salvador) Marcelo Arévalo / (Ecuador) Gonzalo Escobar

== Champions ==
=== Singles ===
- (Japan) Taro Daniel def. (Spain) Albert Montañés, 6–3, 6–0

=== Doubles ===
- (Argentina) Guillermo Durán / (Argentina) Horacio Zeballos def. (Spain) Íñigo Cervantes / (Argentina) Renzo Olivo, 6–1, 6–3
