= 2013 Franken Challenge – Singles =

Singles
- 2013 Franken Challenge

Final
- Champion: (Portugal) João Sousa
- Runner-up: (United States) Wayne Odesnik
- Score: 3–6, 6–3, 6–4

Events
Singles	Doubles
- Franken Challenge

Blaž Kavčič was the defending champion but lost in the second round.
João Sousa defeated Wayne Odesnik 3–6, 6–3, 6–4 in the final to win the title.

== Seeds ==
1. (Slovenia) Blaž Kavčič (second round)
2. (Austria) Andreas Haider-Maurer (semifinals)
3. (United States) Wayne Odesnik (final)
4. (Portugal) João Sousa (champion)
5. (Germany) Simon Greul (quarterfinals)
6. (Germany) Mischa Zverev (first round)
7. (Colombia) Alejandro González (first round)
8. (France) Josselin Ouanna (first round)

== Draw ==
Key

- Q = Qualifier
- WC = Wild card
- LL = Lucky loser
- Alt = Alternate
- ITF = ITF entry
- PR = Protected ranking
- SR = Special ranking
- SE = Special exempt
- JE = Junior exempt
- JR = Junior Accelerator Programme entrant
- CO = College Accelerator Programme entrant
- NG = Next Gen Accelerator Program entrant
- w/o = Walkover
- r = Retired
- d = Defaulted

=== Finals ===
Semifinals
(Germany) Cedrik-Marcel Stebe	4	1
3	(United States) Wayne Odesnik	6	6
4	(Portugal) João Sousa	4	6	6
2	(Austria) Andreas Haider-Maurer	6	4	2

Final
3	(United States) Wayne Odesnik	6	3	4
4	(Portugal) João Sousa	3	6	6

=== Top half ===
First round
1	(Slovenia) B Kavčič	6^{3}	7^{8}	6
(Brazil) M Demoliner	7^{7}	6^{6}	1
(Estonia) J Zopp	1	2
(Germany) C-M Stebe	6	6
(France) P-H Herbert	2	4
(France) V Millot	6	6
Q	(Italy) L Giustino	7^{7}	6
7	(Colombia) A González	6^{4}	3
3	(United States) W Odesnik	3	6	6
WC	(Germany) Peter Heller	6	2	3
(Chile) H Podlipnik-Castillo	6^{5}	1
Q	(United Kingdom) A Ward	7^{7}	6
(France) D Guez	4	6^{5}
WC	(Germany) A Beck	6	7^{7}
(Kazakhstan) M Kukushkin	7^{7}	4	6
6	(Germany) M Zverev	6^{4}	6	4

Second round
1	(Slovenia) B Kavčič	6	3	2
(Germany) C-M Stebe	2	6	6
(France) V Millot	4	6	0
Q	(Italy) L Giustino	6	0	6
3	(United States) W Odesnik	6	7^{7}
Q	(United Kingdom) A Ward	2	6^{4}
WC	(Germany) A Beck	7^{7}	3	6
(Kazakhstan) M Kukushkin	6^{2}	6	1

Quarterfinals
(Germany) C-M Stebe	6	6
Q	(Italy) L Giustino	4	4
3	(United States) W Odesnik	6	6
WC	(Germany) A Beck	1	2

Semifinals
(Germany) C-M Stebe	4	1
3	(United States) W Odesnik	6	6

=== Bottom half ===
First round
5	(Germany) S Greul	4	6	6
(Croatia) N Mektić	6	4	2
Q	(Japan) T Daniel	3	6	3
WC	(Germany) K Krawietz	6	4	6
(Slovakia) A Martin	6	2	6
(United States) A Kuznetsov	4	6	3
(Argentina) F Argüello	3	5
4	(Portugal) J Sousa	6	7
8	(France) J Ouanna	0	r
(Germany) B Knittel	6
(Brazil) L Kirche	7	6
WC	(Germany) R Kern	5	2
Q	(Germany) P Torebko	6	7^{7}
(Bosnia and Herzegovina) A Šetkić	4	6^{3}
PR	(France) Laurent Rochette	4	2
2	(Austria) A Haider-Maurer	6	6

Second round
5	(Germany) S Greul	6	6
WC	(Germany) K Krawietz	2	1
(Slovakia) A Martin	4	6	5
4	(Portugal) J Sousa	6	2	7
(Germany) B Knittel	5	0^{r}
(Brazil) L Kirche	7	2
Q	(Germany) P Torebko	4	3
2	(Austria) A Haider-Maurer	6	6

Quarterfinals
5	(Germany) S Greul	4	0
4	(Portugal) J Sousa	6	6
(Brazil) L Kirche	2	1
2	(Austria) A Haider-Maurer	6	6

Semifinals
4	(Portugal) J Sousa	4	6	6
2	(Austria) A Haider-Maurer	6	4	2
