= 2012 Franken Challenge =

- Date: 4–10 June
- Edition: 26th
- Surface: Clay
- Location: Fürth, Germany

Champions

Singles
- (Slovenia) Blaž Kavčič

Doubles
- (Spain) Arnau Brugués-Davi / (Portugal) João Sousa
- Franken Challenge

The 2012 Franken Challenge was a professional tennis tournament played on clay courts. It was the 26th edition of the tournament which was part of the 2012 ATP Challenger Tour. It took place in Fürth, Germany, between 4 and 10 June 2012.

== Singles main draw entrants ==
=== Seeds ===
Country	Player	Rank^{1}	Seed
UKR	Sergiy Stakhovsky	84	1
SVN	Blaž Kavčič	99	2
GER	Matthias Bachinger	100	3
GER	Daniel Brands	105	4
ITA	Simone Bolelli	111	5
POR	João Sousa	137	6
KAZ	Andrey Golubev	148	7
AUT	Andreas Haider-Maurer	155	8

- ^{1} Rankings are as of May 28, 2012.

=== Other entrants ===
The following players received wildcards into the singles main draw:

- (Germany) Kevin Krawietz
- (Germany) Maximilian Marterer
- (Switzerland) Alexander Ritschard
- (Germany) Jan-Lennard Struff

The following players received entry from the qualifying draw:

- (Brazil) André Ghem
- (France) David Guez
- (Kazakhstan) Yuri Schukin
- (Germany) Marc Sieber

== Champions ==
=== Singles ===
- (Slovenia) Blaž Kavčič def. (Ukraine) Sergiy Stakhovsky, 6–3, 2–6, 6–2

=== Doubles ===
- (Spain) Arnau Brugués-Davi / (Portugal) João Sousa vs. (Australia) Rameez Junaid / (India) Purav Raja, 7–5, 6–7^{(4–7)}, [11–9]
