= ATP Roller Open =

- 2013 ATP Roller Open

ATP Challenger Tour
- Founded: 2012
- Abolished: 2013
- Location: Pétange, Luxembourg
- Venue: Tennis Club de Pétange
- Category: ATP Challenger Tour
- Surface: Hard
- Draw: 32S/16Q/16D
- Prize money: US$64,000
- Notes: Website

The ATP Roller Open was a tennis tournament held in Pétange, Luxembourg since 2012. The event was part of the ATP Challenger Tour and was played on hardcourts.

== Past finals ==
=== Singles ===
Year	Champion	Runner-up	Score
2012	(Germany) Tobias Kamke	(France) Paul-Henri Mathieu	7–6^{(9–7)}, 6–4
2013	(Germany) Tobias Kamke	(France) Paul-Henri Mathieu	1–6, 6–3, 7–5

=== Doubles ===
Year	Champions	Runners-up	Score
2012	(Germany) Christopher Kas (Belgium) Dick Norman	(United Kingdom) Jamie Murray (Brazil) André Sá	2–6, 6–2, [10–8]
2013	(United Kingdom) Ken Skupski (United Kingdom) Neal Skupski	(Germany) Benjamin Becker (Germany) Tobias Kamke	6–3, 6–7^{(5–7)}, [10–7]
