= Tobias Kamke =

German tennis player (born 1986)

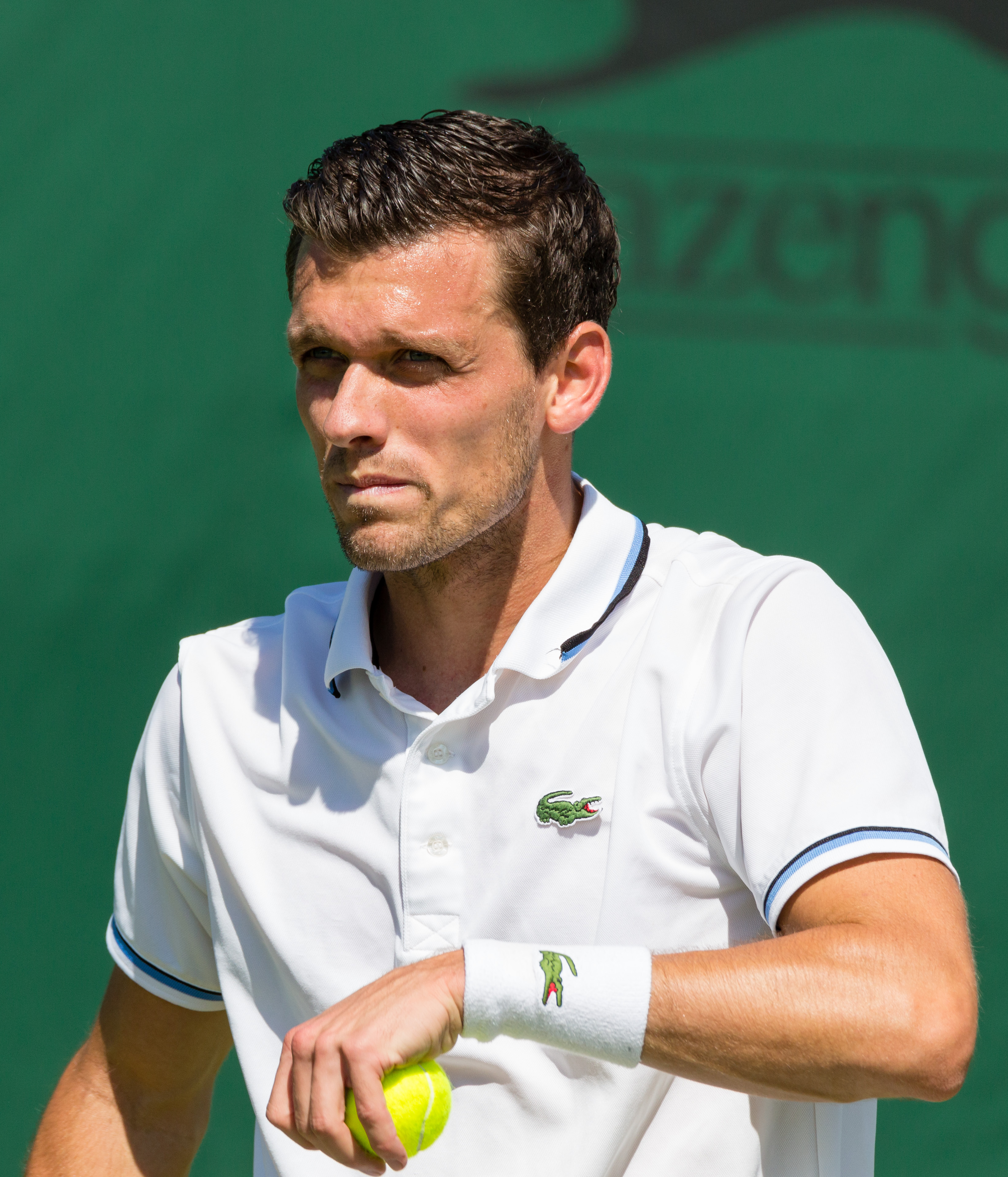
- Kamke at the 2015 Wimbledon Championships
- Country (sports): Germany
- Residence: Hamburg, Germany
- Born: 21 May 1986 (age 39) Lübeck, West Germany
- Height: 1.78 m (5 ft 10 in)
- Turned pro: 2004
- Retired: 2022
- Plays: Right-handed (two-handed backhand)
- Prize money: US$2,572,138

Singles
- Career record: 63–103
- Career titles: 0
- Highest ranking: No. 64 (31 January 2011)

Grand Slam singles results
- Australian Open: 2R (2012, 2013)
- French Open: 2R (2010, 2011, 2013, 2014)
- Wimbledon: 3R (2010)
- US Open: 2R (2013)

Doubles
- Career record: 7–25
- Career titles: 0
- Highest ranking: No. 144 (21 September 2015)

Grand Slam doubles results
- Australian Open: 1R (2011, 2012, 2014)
- French Open: 1R (2013)
- Wimbledon: 1R (2012)
- US Open: 1R (2013)

Team competitions
- Davis Cup: QF (2014)

Tobias Kamke (born 21 May 1986) is a German former professional tennis player. He was ranked as high as world No. 64 in singles by the Association of Tennis Professionals (ATP), which he first achieved in January 2011. In 2010, Kamke was awarded Newcomer of the Year by the ATP after slashing his singles ranking from No. 254 to No. 67 by year-end following four finals on the ATP Challenger Tour, having beaten emerging players Milos Raonic and Ryan Harrison in two of the finals for the titles, and a third round appearance at the Wimbledon Championships, his career-best performance at a major. Kamke announced his retirement in July 2022 and played his last professional match at the Hamburg European Open.

== Professional career ==
=== 2008 ===
Although losing to No. 134 Jan Hernych in the final qualifying round, Kamke reached the main draw in singles of the Wimbledon Championships as a lucky loser. However, he then lost his first match to world No. 30, Andreas Seppi.

=== 2010 ===
He made the main draw at Wimbledon where he progressed through to the first and second rounds and then lost to 10th seed Jo-Wilfried Tsonga, 1–6, 4–6, 6–7. In July, he won the Challenger Banque Nationale de Granby by beating Milos Raonic in the final, 6–3, 7–6. At the Tiburon Challenger, he secured his second career Challenger title by defeating Ryan Harrison in the final. He reached back-to-back second rounds on ATP World Tour-level at Stockholm, Vienna and Basel.

As Kamke started the year as world No. 254 and finished it as world No. 67, he was awarded "Newcomer of the Year" by the ATP.

=== 2011 ===
2011 saw Kamke reach career-high rankings in both singles (world No. 64 in January) and doubles (world No. 419 in October).

=== 2012 ===
Kamke faced Roger Federer in the first round of the French Open. He led Federer by 4–1 in the second set before losing 2–6, 5–7, 3–6. In September, he reached a new career-high in doubles at world No. 256.

=== 2022 ===
Kamke announced his retirement in July 2022 and played his last professional match at the Hamburg European Open in the doubles tournament with Dustin Brown; they lost in the first round.

== Singles performance timeline ==
Key
W	F	SF	QF	#R	RR	Q#	DNQ	A	NH

(W) winner; (F) finalist; (SF) semifinalist; (QF) quarterfinalist; (#R) rounds 4, 3, 2, 1; (RR) round-robin stage; (Q#) qualification round; (DNQ) did not qualify; (A) absent; (NH) not held; (SR) strike rate (events won / competed); (W–L) win–loss record.
To avoid confusion and double counting, these charts are updated at the conclusion of a tournament or when the player's participation has ended.

Tournament	2004	2005	2006	2007	2008	2009	2010	2011	2012	2013	2014	2015	2016	2017	2018	2019	2020	2021	2022	SR	W–L
Grand Slam tournaments
Australian Open	A	A	A	A	Q1	Q1	Q2	1R	2R	2R	1R	1R	A	Q2	Q2	Q2	Q1	Q1	Q3	0 / 5	2–5
French Open	A	A	A	A	Q2	Q1	2R	2R	1R	2R	2R	A	1R	Q2	Q2	A	Q1	Q3	A	0 / 6	4–6
Wimbledon	A	A	A	A	1R	Q2	3R	2R	1R	1R	1R	Q2	Q3	Q1	Q2	A	NH	Q1	A	0 / 6	3–6
US Open	A	A	A	A	Q3	Q1	1R	1R	1R	2R	1R	Q2	Q3	Q2	A	1R	A	Q1	A	0 / 6	1–6
Win–loss	0–0	0–0	0–0	0–0	0–1	0–0	3–3	2–4	1–4	3–4	1–4	0–1	0–1	0–0	0–0	0–1	0–0	0–0	0–0	0 / 23	10–23
ATP Tour Masters 1000
Indian Wells Masters	A	A	A	A	A	A	A	1R	1R	Q1	1R	Q1	A	Q2	A	A	NH	A	A	0 / 3	0–3
Miami Open	A	A	A	A	A	A	A	1R	1R	3R	Q2	Q1	A	Q2	A	A	NH	A	A	0 / 3	2–3
Monte-Carlo Masters	A	A	A	A	A	A	A	Q2	Q1	Q1	A	A	A	A	A	A	NH	A	A	0 / 0	0–0
Madrid Open	A	A	A	A	A	A	A	A	A	1R	Q2	Q1	A	A	A	A	NH	A	A	0 / 1	0–1
Italian Open	A	A	A	A	A	A	A	A	A	A	Q1	A	A	A	A	A	A	A	A	0 / 0	0–0
Canadian Open	A	A	A	A	A	A	A	1R	A	Q2	1R	A	A	A	A	A	NH	A	A	0 / 2	0–2
Cincinnati Masters	A	A	A	A	A	A	A	A	A	Q1	Q1	A	A	A	A	A	A	A	A	0 / 0	0–0
Shanghai Masters	not held					A	A	A	A	A	A	A	A	A	A	A	NH		A	0 / 0	0–0
Paris Masters	A	A	A	A	A	A	Q1	A	A	A	A	A	A	A	A	A	A	A	A	0 / 0	0–0
German Open	A	A	Q1	Q1	A	not Masters series														0 / 0	0–0
Win–loss	0–0	0–0	0–0	0–0	0–0	0–0	0–0	0–3	0–2	2–2	0–2	0–0	0–0	0–0	0–0	0–0	0–0	0–0	0–0	0 / 9	2–9
National representation
Davis Cup	A	A	A	A	A	A	A	A	A	1R	QF	A	A	A	A	A	A	A	A	0 / 2	1–2
Career statistics
Tournaments	0	0	0	1	1	0	8	23	18	21	16	5	5	2	0	1	0	0	0	101	
Overall win–loss	0–0	0–0	0–0	0–1	0–1	0–0	7–8	15–23	6–18	17–22	10–17	1–5	5–5	2–2	0–0	0–1	0–0	0–0	0–0	63–103	
Year-end ranking	809	716	445	210	243	254	67	96	98	74	98	277	118	233	213	242	236	255	673	38%	

== ATP Challenger and ITF Futures finals ==
=== Singles: 20 (11–9) ===
Legend ATP Challenger (8–8) ITF Futures (3–1)	Finals by surface Hard (6–4) Clay (4–5) Grass (0–0) Carpet (1–0)

Result	W–L	Date	Tournament	Tier	Surface	Opponent	Score
Loss	0–1	Jun 2004	Germany F8, Leun	Futures	Clay	(Hungary) Kornel Bardoczky	2–6, 3–6
Win	1–1	Jul 2006	Austria F4, Anif	Futures	Clay	(Germany) Matthias Bachinger	6–1, 7–6^{(9–7)}
Win	2–1	Aug 2006	Germany F11, Essen	Futures	Clay	(Belgium) Maxime Authom	6–1, 6–4
Win	3–1	Feb 2007	Germany F4, Mettmann	Futures	Carpet (i)	(Germany) Dieter Kindlmann	6–2, 4–6, 6–3
Loss	0–1	Nov 2007	Helsinki, Finland	Challenger	Hard (i)	(Belgium) Steve Darcis	3–6, 6–1, 4–6
Loss	0–2	May 2008	Karlsruhe, Germany	Challenger	Clay	(Russia) Teymuraz Gabashvili	1–6, 4–6
Loss	0–3	Apr 2010	Baton Rouge, United States	Challenger	Hard	(South Africa) Kevin Anderson	7–6^{(9–7)}, 6–7^{(7–9)}, 1–6
Loss	0–4	May 2010	Fürth, Germany	Challenger	Clay	(Netherlands) Robin Haase	4–6, 2–6
Win	1–4	May 2010	Granby, Canada	Challenger	Hard	(Canada) Milos Raonic	6–3, 7–6^{(7–4)}
Win	2–4	Oct 2010	Tiburon, United States	Challenger	Hard	(United States) Ryan Harrison	6–1, 6–1
Win	3–4	Nov 2011	Loughborough, Great Britain	Challenger	Hard	(Italy) Flavio Cipolla	6–2, 7–5
Loss	3–5	Jul 2012	Braunschweig, Germany	Challenger	Clay	(Brazil) Thomaz Bellucci	6–7^{(4–7)}, 3–6
Win	4–5	Sep 2012	Pétange, Luxembourg	Challenger	Hard (i)	(France) Paul-Henri Mathieu	7–6^{(9–7)}, 6–4
Win	5–5	Sep 2013	Pétange, Luxembourg (2)	Challenger	Hard (i)	(France) Paul-Henri Mathieu	1–6, 6–3, 7–5
Win	6–5	Jun 2014	Fürth, Germany	Challenger	Clay	(Spain) Íñigo Cervantes	6–3, 6–2
Win	7–5	Aug 2015	Liberec, Czech Republic	Challenger	Clay	(Slovakia) Andrej Martin	7–6^{(7–4)}, 6–4
Win	8–5	Mar 2016	Kazan, Russia	Challenger	Hard (i)	(Russia) Aslan Karatsev	6–4, 6–2
Loss	8–6	Apr 2017	Saint-Brieuc, France	Challenger	Hard (i)	(Belarus) Egor Gerasimov	6–7^{(3–7)}, 6–7^{(5–7)}
Loss	8–7	Mar 2018	Lille, France	Challenger	Hard (i)	(France) Grégoire Barrère	1–6, 4–6
Loss	8–8	Jul 2019	Braunschweig, Germany	Challenger	Clay	(Brazil) Thiago Monteiro	6–7^{(6–8)}, 1–6

=== Doubles: 7 (3–4) ===
Result	W–L	Date	Tournament	Surface	Partner	Opponents	Score
Loss	0–1	Feb 2010	Kazan, Russia	Hard (i)	(Germany) Julian Reister	(Czech Republic) Jan Mertl (Kazakhstan) Yuri Schukin	2–6, 4–6
Loss	0–2	Sep 2013	Pétange, Luxembourg	Hard (i)	(Germany) Benjamin Becker	(United Kingdom) Ken Skupski (United Kingdom) Neal Skupski	3–6, 7–6^{(7–5)}, [7–10]
Win	1–2	Oct 2014	Rennes, France	Hard (i)	(Germany) Philipp Marx	(Czech Republic) František Čermák (Israel) Jonathan Erlich	3–6, 6–2, [10–3]
Loss	1–3	Nov 2014	Mouilleron-le-Captif, France	Hard (i)	(Germany) Philipp Marx	(France) Pierre-Hugues Herbert (France) Nicolas Mahut	3–6, 4–6
Loss	1–4	Jul 2015	Marburg, Germany	Clay	(Germany) Simon Stadler	(Netherlands) Wesley Koolhof (Netherlands) Matwé Middelkoop	1–6, 5–7
Win	2–4	Sep 2015	Alphen, Netherlands	Clay	(Germany) Jan-Lennard Struff	(Romania) Victor Hănescu (Romania) Adrian Ungur	7–6^{(7–1)}, 3–6, [10–7]
Win	3–4	Mar 2018	Yokohama, Japan	Hard	(Germany) Tim Pütz	(Thailand) Sanchai Ratiwatana (Thailand) Sonchat Ratiwatana	3–6, 7–5, [12–10]

== Head-to-head record against top 10 players ==
Kamke's match record against players who have been ranked in the top ten. Only ATP Tour main-draw and Davis Cup matches are considered. Players who have been No. 1 are in boldface.

- (United States) James Blake 1–0
- (United States) Taylor Fritz 1–0
- (Argentina) Juan Martín del Potro 1–0
- (Italy) Fabio Fognini 1–1
- (Austria) Jürgen Melzer 1–1
- (Spain) Tommy Robredo 1–1
- (Czech Republic) Tomáš Berdych 1–2
- (Spain) Roberto Bautista Agut 0–1
- (Spain) Pablo Carreño Busta 0–1
- (United States) Mardy Fish 0–1
- (Belgium) David Goffin 0–1
- (Australia) **Lleyton Hewitt** 0–1
- (Germany) Tommy Haas 0–1
- (Russia) **Daniil Medvedev** 0–1
- (United Kingdom) **Andy Murray** 0–1
- (Spain) **Rafael Nadal** 0–1
- (United States) Jack Sock 0–1
- (Czech Republic) Radek Štěpánek 0–1
- (Serbia) Janko Tipsarević 0–1
- (Switzerland) Stan Wawrinka 0–1
- (Cyprus) Marcos Baghdatis 0–2
- (Croatia) Marin Čilić 0–2
- (Switzerland) **Roger Federer** 0–2
- (France) Richard Gasquet 0–2
- (United States) John Isner 0–2
- (Canada) Milos Raonic 0–2
- (Spain) Fernando Verdasco 0–2
- (Germany) Alexander Zverev 0–2
- (Spain) Nicolás Almagro 0–3
- (Spain) David Ferrer 0–3
- (France) Jo-Wilfried Tsonga 0–3
- (Argentina) Juan Mónaco 0–4

== Top 10 wins ==
#	Player	Rank	Event	Surface	Rd	Score	TK Rank
**2010**
1.	(Czech Republic) Tomáš Berdych	6	Basel, Switzerland	Hard (i)	1R	6–4, 6–1	72
**2013**
2.	(Argentina) Juan Martín del Potro	7	Miami, United States	Hard	2R	7–6^{(7–5)}, 6–1	89

Awards and achievements
Preceded by Horacio Zeballos	ATP Newcomer of the Year; 2010	Succeeded by Milos Raonic
