= Franken Challenge =

German tennis tournament

- 2016 Franken Challenge

Defunct tennis tournament
- Event name: Franken Challenge
- Location: Fürth, Germany
- Venue: TV Fürth 1860
- Category: ATP Challenger Tour
- Surface: Clay
- Draw: 32S/31Q/16D
- Prize money: €42,500+H
- Website: Website

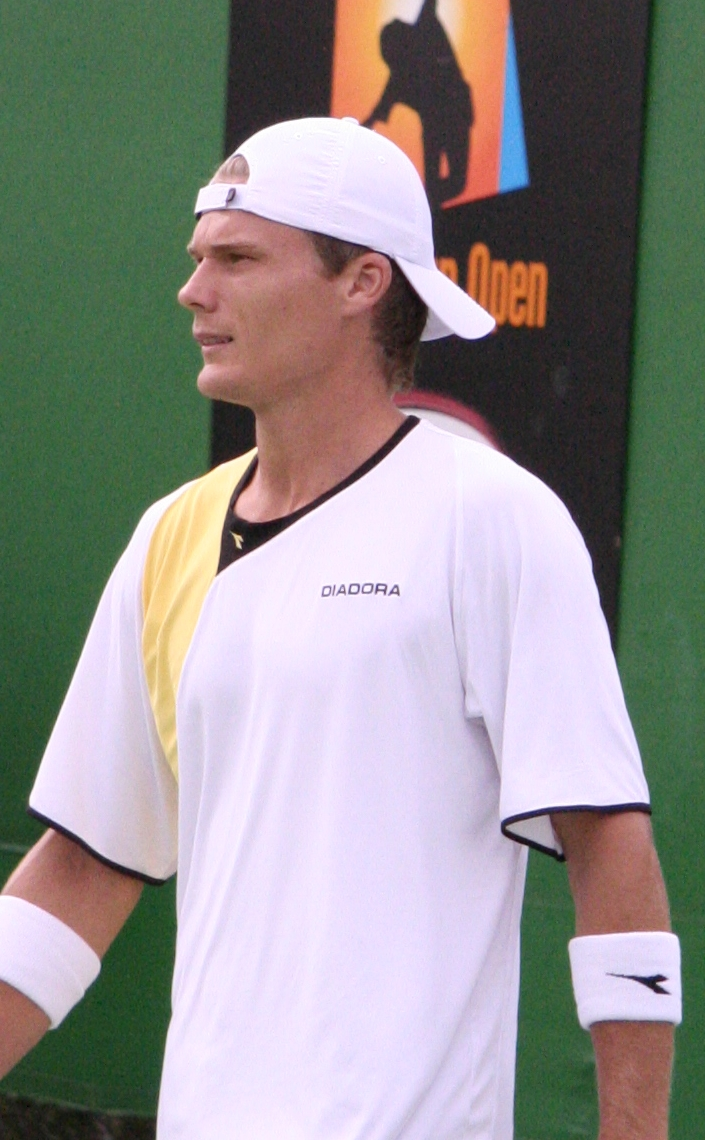
Australian Peter Luczak took the singles title in Fürth in 2007 and 2009

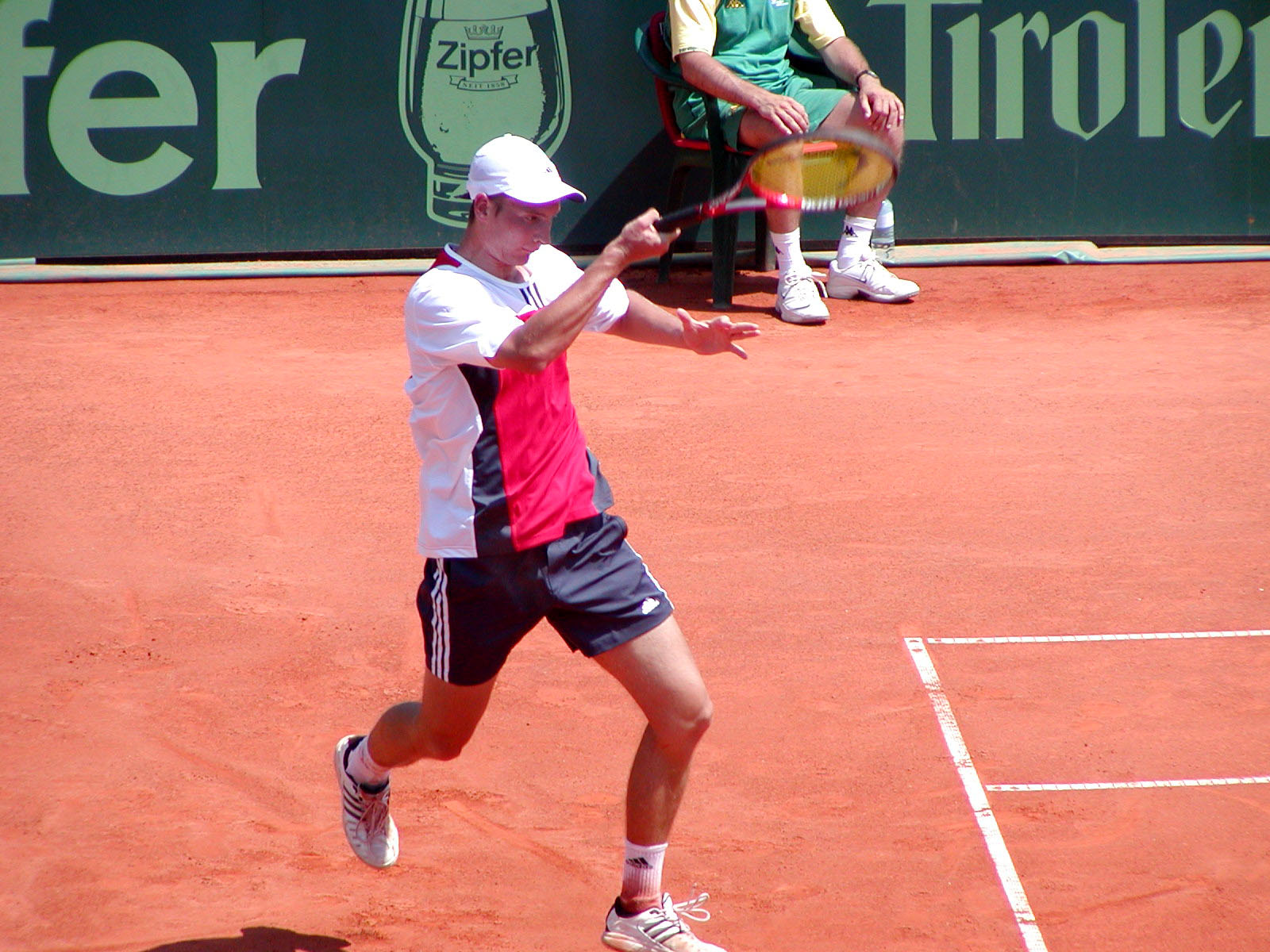
Florian Mayer from Germany won the event in singles in 2006

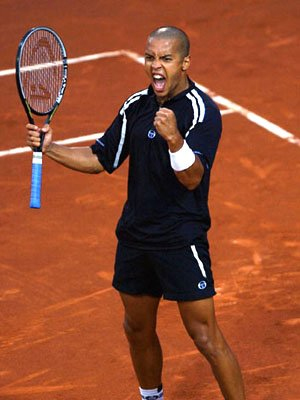
Morocco's Hicham Arazi defeated Andrei Chesnokov for the 1996 singles

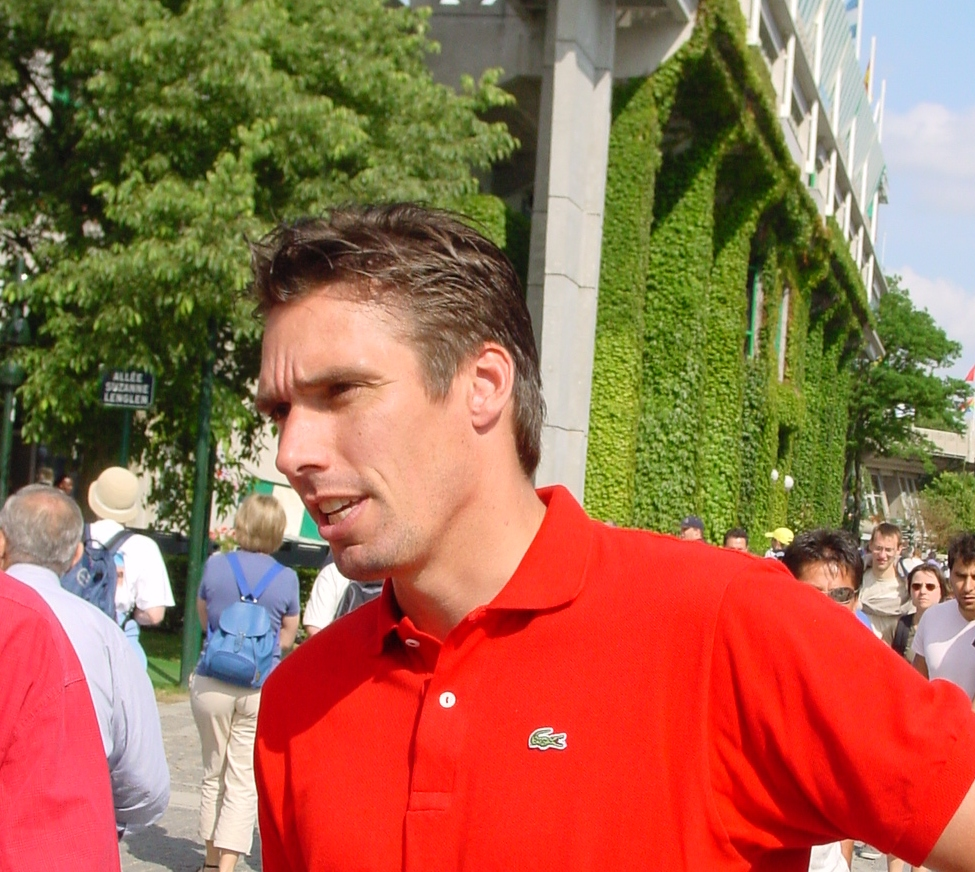
Eventual German World No. 2 Michael Stich won the doubles in 1988 with Martin Sinner

The Franken Challenge (former Schickedanz Open) is a professional tennis tournament played on outdoor red clay courts. It is currently part of the Association of Tennis Professionals (ATP) Challenger Tour. It is held annually in Fürth, Germany, since 1979 (as a club event from 1979 to 1985, as a Futures in 1986, as a Challenger since 1987). After having been on the calendar for 38 years, the 2017 edition had to be cancelled for lack of funding.

== Past finals ==
=== Singles ===
Year	Champion	Runner-up	Score
2016	(Moldova) Radu Albot	(Germany) Jan-Lennard Struff	6–3, 6–4
2015	(Japan) Taro Daniel	(Spain) Albert Montañés	6–3, 6–0
2014	(Germany) Tobias Kamke	(Spain) Iñigo Cervantes Huegun	6–3, 6–2
2013	(Portugal) João Sousa	(United States) Wayne Odesnik	3–6, 6–3, 6–4
2012	(Slovenia) Blaž Kavčič	(Ukraine) Sergiy Stakhovsky	6–3, 2–6, 6–2
2011	(Portugal) João Sousa	(Germany) Jan-Lennard Struff	6–2, 0–6, 6–2
2010	(Netherlands) Robin Haase	(Germany) Tobias Kamke	6–4, 6–2
2009	(Australia) Peter Luczak	(Argentina) Juan Pablo Brzezicki	6–2, 6–0
2008	(Austria) Daniel Köllerer	(Colombia) Santiago Giraldo	6–1, 6–3
2007	(Australia) Peter Luczak	(Italy) Fabio Fognini	4–6, 6–2, 6–2
2006	(Germany) Florian Mayer	(Germany) Torsten Popp	6–3, 6–1
2005	(Spain) Albert Portas	(Germany) Philipp Kohlschreiber	7–6(5), 6–2
2004	(Czech Republic) Jiří Vaněk	(France) Gilles Simon	7–5, 6–2
2003	(Norway) Jan Frode Andersen	(Spain) Óscar Hernández	2–6, 6–2, 6–2
2002	(Peru) Luis Horna	(Austria) Jürgen Melzer	6–4, 6–2
2001	(Spain) Germán Puentes-Alcañiz	(Denmark) Kristian Pless	6–4, 6–3
2000	(Georgia (country)) Irakli Labadze	(Germany) Daniel Elsner	6–4, 6–4
1999	(Haiti) Ronald Agénor	(Czech Republic) Tomáš Zíb	6–2, 7–6
1998	(Norway) Christian Ruud	(Norway) Jan Frode Andersen	6–4, 7–5
1997	(Italy) Davide Sanguinetti	(Sweden) Tomas Nydahl	6–4, 6–2
1996	(Morocco) Hicham Arazi	(Russia) Andrei Chesnokov	3–6, 6–2, 6–2
1995	(Norway) Christian Ruud	(Sweden) Magnus Gustafsson	7–6, 6–4
1994	(Belgium) Kris Goossens	(Germany) Dirk Dier	6–7, 6–3, 6–2
1993	(Sweden) Mikael Pernfors	(Belgium) Bart Wuyts	6–4, 1–6, 6–3
1992	(Czechoslovakia) Martin Střelba	(Ecuador) Raúl Viver	6–1, 6–2
1991	(Spain) Marcos Aurelio Gorriz	(Soviet Union) Dimitri Poliakov	6–2, 3–0 retired
1990	(United States) Jeff Tarango	(Chile) Felipe Rivera	6–0, 6–0
1989	(Soviet Union) Dimitri Poliakov	(Italy) Federico Mordegan	6–2, 6–1
1988	(West Germany) Hans-Dieter Beutel	(Czechoslovakia) Richard Vogel	1–6, 6–3, 6–4
1987	(West Germany) Patrick Baur	(Italy) Edoardo Mazza	6–3, 7–5

=== Doubles ===
Year	Champions	Runners-up	Score
2016	(Argentina) Facundo Argüello (Venezuela) Roberto Maytín	(Slovakia) Andrej Martin (Austria) Tristan-Samuel Weissborn	6–3, 6–4
2015	(Argentina) Guillermo Durán (Argentina) Horacio Zeballos	(Spain) Íñigo Cervantes (Argentina) Renzo Olivo	6–1, 6–3
2014	(Spain) Gerard Granollers (Spain) Jordi Samper Montaña	(Spain) Adrián Menéndez Maceiras (Spain) Rubén Ramírez Hidalgo	7–6^{(7–1)}, 6–2
2013	(Australia) Colin Ebelthite (Australia) Rameez Junaid	(United States) Christian Harrison (New Zealand) Michael Venus	6–4, 7–5
2012	(Spain) Arnau Brugués-Davi (Portugal) João Sousa	(Australia) Rameez Junaid (India) Purav Raja	7–5, 6–7^{(4–7)}, [11–9]
2011	(Australia) Rameez Junaid (Germany) Frank Moser	(Chile) Jorge Aguilar (Ecuador) Júlio César Campozano	6–2, 6–7(2), [10–6]
2010	(Jamaica) Dustin Brown (Australia) Rameez Junaid	(Germany) Martin Emmrich (Australia) Joseph Sirianni	6–3, 6–1
2009	(Spain) Rubén Ramírez Hidalgo (Spain) Santiago Ventura	(Germany) Simon Greul (Italy) Alessandro Motti	4–6, 6–1, 10–6
2008	(Germany) Philipp Marx (Austria) Alexander Peya	(Austria) Daniel Köllerer (Germany) Frank Moser	6–3, 6–3
2007	(Mexico) Bruno Echagaray (Brazil) André Ghem	(Italy) Fabio Fognini (Portugal) Frederico Gil	7–6(1), 4–6, 13–11
2006	(Greece) Vasilis Mazarakis (Chile) Felipe Parada	(Germany) Philipp Marx (Germany) Torsten Popp	6–3, 6–2
2005	(Israel) Amir Hadad (Israel) Harel Levy	(Norway) Jan Frode Andersen (Sweden) Johan Landsberg	6–1, 6–2
2004	(Chile) Adrián García (Serbia and Montenegro) Janko Tipsarević	(Sweden) Simon Aspelin (United States) Graydon Oliver	6–4, 6–4
2003	(Germany) Denis Gremelmayr (Germany) Simon Greul	(Germany) Tomas Behrend (Germany) Karsten Braasch	6–3, 1–6, 7–6(5)
2002	(Spain) Salvador Navarro-Gutierrez (Spain) Gabriel Trujillo Soler	(Uzbekistan) Vadim Kutsenko (Uzbekistan) Oleg Ogorodov	6–2, 6–4
2001	(United States) Hugo Armando (Russia) Andrei Stoliarov	(Uzbekistan) Vadim Kutsenko (Uzbekistan) Oleg Ogorodov	6–0, 6–0
2000	(Spain) Eduardo Nicolás-Espín (Spain) Germán Puentes-Alcañiz	(United States) Devin Bowen (United States) Brandon Coupe	6–4, 6–2
1999	(Federal Republic of Yugoslavia) Nebojša Đorđević (South Africa) Marcos Ondruska	(Argentina) Diego del Río (Argentina) Martín Rodríguez	4–6, 6–3, 6–4
1998	(Spain) Álex López Morón (Spain) Albert Portas	(Spain) Juan-Ignacio Carrasco (Argentina) Martín Rodríguez	6–4, 6–4
1997	(United States) Brandon Coupe (South Africa) Paul Rosner	(Germany) Martin Sinner (Netherlands) Joost Winnink	7–5, 6–3
1996	(Australia) Joshua Eagle (Netherlands) Tom Kempers	(North Macedonia) Aleksandar Kitinov (Hungary) Gábor Köves	6–4, 6–7, 6–4
1995	(Australia) Andrew Kratzmann (Australia) Brent Larkham	(United States) Ken Flach (United States) Kent Kinnear	6–4, 6–7, 7–6
1994	(Czech Republic) Vojtech Flegl (Australia) Andrew Florent	(Argentina) Gastón Etlis (Argentina) Christian Miniussi	7–6, 6–1
1993	(Sweden) Nils Holm (Sweden) Lars-Anders Wahlgren	(Latvia) Ģirts Dzelde (Georgia (country)) Vladimer Gabrichidze	walkover
1992	(Germany) Rüdiger Haas (Germany) Udo Riglewski	(United States) Brian Joelson (Haiti) Bertrand Madsen	6–1, 6–3
1991	(Spain) Marcos Aurelio Gorriz (Venezuela) Maurice Ruah	(Australia) Jamie Morgan (Australia) Sandon Stolle	6–2, 6–4
1990	(West Germany) Peter Ballauff (West Germany) Ricki Osterthun	(Spain) Marcos-Aurelio Gorriz-Bonhora (Soviet Union) Andrei Olhovskiy	7–6, 4–6, 6–3
1989	(Soviet Union) Vladimer Gabrichidze (Soviet Union) Dimitri Poliakov	(Italy) Cristiano Caratti (Italy) Federico Mordegan	6–4, 6–7, 6–4
1988	(West Germany) Michael Stich (West Germany) Martin Sinner	(Poland) Wojciech Kowalski (Romania) Adrian Marcu	4–6, 6–3, 7–6
1987	(United Kingdom) Nick Fulwood (Czechoslovakia) Cyril Suk	(West Germany) Axel Hornung (West Germany) Karsten Saniter	4–6, 6–3, 6–2
