= 2011 Internationaler Apano Cup – Singles =

Singles
- 2011 Internationaler Apano Cup

Final
- Champion: (Argentina) Leonardo Mayer
- Runner-up: (Netherlands) Thomas Schoorel
- Score: 6–3, 6–2

Events
Singles	Doubles
← 2010 ·	Internationaler Apano Cup	· 2012 →

Unseeded Leonardo Mayer won first edition of this tournament. He defeated Nikola Ćirić, Javier Martí, Horacio Zeballos, Maxime Authom and Thomas Schoorel in the final.

== Seeds ==
1. (Argentina) Horacio Zeballos (quarterfinals)
2. (Netherlands) Thomas Schoorel (final)
3. (Germany) Björn Phau (quarterfinals)
4. (Russia) Teymuraz Gabashvili (quarterfinals)
5. (Slovakia) Martin Kližan (quarterfinals)
6. (Germany) Simon Greul (second round)
7. (Belarus) Uladzimir Ignatik (first round)
8. (Germany) ~~Julian Reister~~ (withdrew due to knee injury)
9. (Serbia) Nikola Ćirić (first round)

== Draw ==
=== Key ===
- Q = Qualifier
- WC = Wild card
- LL = Lucky loser
- Alt = Alternate
- SE = Special exempt
- PR = Protected ranking
- ITF = ITF entry
- JE = Junior exempt
- w/o = Walkover
- r = Retired
- d = Defaulted
- SR = Special ranking

=== Finals ===
Semifinals
(Argentina) Leonardo Mayer	2	6	6
Q	(Belgium) Maxime Authom	6	3	4
(Argentina) Facundo Bagnis	4	2
2	(Netherlands) Thomas Schoorel	6	6

Final
(Argentina) Leonardo Mayer	6	6
2	(Netherlands) Thomas Schoorel	3	2

=== Top half ===
First round
1	(Argentina) H Zeballos	7	6
(France) V Millot	5	4
WC	(Germany) N Langer	5	0^{r}
Q	(France) M Teixeira	7	0
(Spain) J Martí	6	7^{9}
(Germany) S Stadler	2	6^{7}
(Argentina) L Mayer	6	6
9	(Serbia) N Ćirić	1	3
4	(Russia) T Gabashvili	5	6	6
(Belgium) Y Mertens	7	1	2
(Argentina) P Galdón	6	6
(Italy) M Crugnola	3	4
(Germany) C-M Stebe	1	3
Q	(Belgium) M Authom	6	6
(Argentina) A Molteni	1	0
6	(Germany) S Greul	6	6

Second round
1	(Argentina) H Zeballos	6	6
(France) M Teixeira	3	4
(Spain) J Martí	2	4
(Argentina) L Mayer	6	6
4	(Russia) T Gabashvili	6	6
(Argentina) P Galdón	1	2
Q	(Belgium) M Authom	6	6
6	(Germany) S Greul	2	0

Quarterfinals
1	(Argentina) H Zeballos	2	3
(Argentina) L Mayer	6	6
4	(Russia) T Gabashvili	6	2	4
Q	(Belgium) M Authom	3	6	6

Semifinals
(Argentina) L Mayer	2	6	6
Q	(Belgium) M Authom	6	3	4

=== Bottom half ===
First round
7	(Belarus) U Ignatik	4	4
(Germany) J-L Struff	6	6
(Argentina) F Bagnis	6	6
Q	(Netherlands) N van der Meer	4	3
(Germany) D Meffert	6	2	6
(Croatia) K Mesaroš	3	6	4
LL	(Argentina) M Trungelliti	6^{5}	4
3	(Germany) B Phau	7^{7}	6
5	(Slovakia) M Kližan	6	4	6
Q	(Brazil) A Ghem	4	6	3
WC	(Germany) Marvin Netuschil	7	2	2
WC	(Austria) N Reissig	5	6	6
(Russia) A Kuznetsov	7^{7}	6^{4}	6^{3}
(Belgium) D Goffin	6^{4}	7^{7}	7^{7}
WC	(Germany) D Masur	2	2
2	(Netherlands) T Schoorel	6	6

Second round
(Germany) J-L Struff	4	4
(Argentina) F Bagnis	6	6
(Germany) D Meffert	6^{10}	4
3	(Germany) B Phau	7^{12}	6
5	(Slovakia) M Kližan	6	2	1
WC	(Austria) N Reissig	2	6	4^{r}
(Belgium) D Goffin	4	5
2	(Netherlands) T Schoorel	6	7

Quarterfinals
(Argentina) F Bagnis	7	6
3	(Germany) B Phau	6	4
5	(Slovakia) M Kližan	3	4
2	(Netherlands) T Schoorel	6	6

Semifinals
(Argentina) F Bagnis	4	2
2	(Netherlands) T Schoorel	6	6
