= 2012 I Marbella Open – Singles =

Singles
- 2012 I Marbella Open

Final
- Champion: (Spain) Albert Montañés
- Runner-up: (Spain) Daniel Muñoz de la Nava
- Score: 3–6, 6–2, 6–3

Events
Singles	Doubles
I Marbella Open

Albert Montañés won the final 3–6, 6–2, 6–3 against Daniel Muñoz de la Nava to capture the title.

== Seeds ==
1. (Spain) Daniel Gimeno-Traver (second round)
2. (Russia) Andrey Kuznetsov (quarterfinals)
3. (Spain) Rubén Ramírez Hidalgo (quarterfinals)
4. (Slovenia) Blaž Kavčič (second round, retired)
5. (Romania) Adrian Ungur (first round)
6. (Spain) Albert Montañés (champion)
7. (Croatia) Antonio Veić (semifinals)
8. (Spain) Iñigo Cervantes Huegun (first round)

== Draw ==
=== Key ===
- Q = Qualifier
- WC = Wild card
- LL = Lucky loser
- Alt = Alternate
- SE = Special exempt
- PR = Protected ranking
- ITF = ITF entry
- JE = Junior exempt
- w/o = Walkover
- r = Retired
- d = Defaulted
- SR = Special ranking

=== Finals ===
Semifinals
(Spain) Daniel Muñoz de la Nava	6	7^{11}
Q	(Slovenia) Blaž Rola	2	6^{9}
6	(Spain) Albert Montañés	6	6
7	(Croatia) Antonio Veić	3	4

Final
(Spain) Daniel Muñoz de la Nava	6	2	3
6	(Spain) Albert Montañés	3	6	6

=== Top half ===
First round
1	(Spain) D Gimeno-Traver	6	6
(Germany) D Meffert	1	4
(Spain) A Brugués-Davi	2	3
Q	(Spain) R Carballés Baena	6	6
(Spain) J Martí	6^{5}	6	6
(Czech Republic) J Mertl	7^{7}	2	4
(Spain) D Muñoz de la Nava	6	5	6
5	(Romania) A Ungur	1	7	3
4	(Slovenia) B Kavčič	7	6
WC	(Spain) Carlos Gómez-Herrera	5	0
(Italy) S Vagnozzi	2	4
(Spain) S Gutiérrez Ferrol	6	6
(Canada) S Diez	6	4	6
(Belgium) N Desein	0	6	2
Q	(Slovenia) B Rola	6	2	6
8	(Spain) I Cervantes Huegun	4	6	3

Second round
1	(Spain) D Gimeno-Traver	5	3
Q	(Spain) R Carballés Baena	7	6
(Spain) J Martí	4	7^{7}	5
(Spain) D Muñoz de la Nava	6	6^{1}	7
4	(Slovenia) B Kavčič	5	1^{r}
(Spain) S Gutiérrez Ferrol	7	4
(Canada) S Diez	6^{8}	4
Q	(Slovenia) B Rola	7^{10}	6

Quarterfinals
Q	(Spain) R Carballés Baena	4	4
(Spain) D Muñoz de la Nava	6	6
(Spain) S Gutiérrez Ferrol	6^{4}	6	3
Q	(Slovenia) B Rola	7^{7}	3	6

Semifinals
(Spain) D Muñoz de la Nava	6	7^{11}
Q	(Slovenia) B Rola	2	6^{9}

=== Bottom half ===
First round
6	(Spain) A Montañés	6	6
WC	(Spain) Mario Vilella	2	0
WC	(Spain) Manuel de Luis	2	2
(France) V Millot	6	6
(Serbia) N Ćirić	2	4
(Slovakia) A Martin	6	6
(Italy) T Fabbiano	4	4
3	(Spain) R Ramírez Hidalgo	6	6
7	(Croatia) A Veić	5
(Serbia) B Pašanski	3^{r}
(Spain) A Menéndez	3	6	6^{5}
Q	(Spain) J Samper-Montaña	6	4	7^{7}
(Italy) G Naso	6	7
WC	(Serbia) M Djokovic	1	5
Q	(Spain) D Pérez Sanz	3	5
2	(Russia) A Kuznetsov	6	7

Second round
6	(Spain) A Montañés	6	6
(France) V Millot	0	1
(Slovakia) A Martin	3	5
3	(Spain) R Ramírez Hidalgo	6	7
7	(Croatia) A Veić	2	6	6
Q	(Spain) J Samper-Montaña	6	3	2
(Italy) G Naso	3	1
2	(Russia) A Kuznetsov	6	6

Quarterfinals
6	(Spain) A Montañés	3	6	6
3	(Spain) R Ramírez Hidalgo	6	2	2
7	(Croatia) A Veić	6	3	7^{7}
2	(Russia) A Kuznetsov	3	6	6^{2}

Semifinals
6	(Spain) A Montañés	6	6
7	(Croatia) A Veić	3	4
