= 2011 Internationaler Apano Cup – Doubles =

Doubles
- 2011 Internationaler Apano Cup

Final
- Champions: (Germany) Dominik Meffert (Germany) Björn Phau
- Runners-up: (Russia) Teymuraz Gabashvili (Russia) Andrey Kuznetsov
- Score: 6–4, 6–3

Events
Singles	Doubles
← 2010 ·	Internationaler Apano Cup	· 2012 →

Dominik Meffert and Björn Phau won the title, defeating Teymuraz Gabashvili and Andrey Kuznetsov 6–4, 6–3 in the final.

== Seeds ==
1. (Australia) Colin Ebelthite / (Australia) Adam Feeney (semifinals)
2. (Argentina) Facundo Bagnis / (Argentina) Horacio Zeballos (first round)
3. (Austria) Martin Slanar / (Germany) Simon Stadler (quarterfinals)
4. (Germany) Dominik Meffert / (Germany) Björn Phau (champions)

== Draw ==
=== Key ===
- Q = Qualifier
- WC = Wild card
- LL = Lucky loser
- Alt = Alternate
- SE = Special exempt
- PR = Protected ranking
- ITF = ITF entry
- JE = Junior exempt
- w/o = Walkover
- r = Retired
- d = Defaulted
- SR = Special ranking

=== Draw ===
First round
1	(Australia) C Ebelthite (Australia) A Feeney	w/o
(Belgium) M Authom (France) M Teixeira
(Netherlands) Romano Frantzen (Netherlands) N van der Meer	2	6	[10]
(South Africa) J Coetzee (Australia) S Kadir	6	3	[12]
4	(Germany) D Meffert (Germany) B Phau	6	6
WC	(Germany) Phillip Karwasz (Germany) Alexander Mannapov	3	1
(Germany) Patrick Pradella (Germany) J-L Struff	4	7	[11]
WC	(Germany) D Masur (Germany) Mattis Wetzel	6	5	[9]
Alt	(Argentina) Emiliano Redondi (Argentina) M Trungelliti
(Argentina) P Galdón (Argentina) A Molteni	w/o
(Belarus) U Ignatik (Slovakia) M Kližan	1	4
3	(Austria) M Slanar (Germany) S Stadler	6	6
(Spain) Óscar Burrieza (Spain) J Martí	2	6^{3}
(Russia) T Gabashvili (Russia) A Kuznetsov	6	7^{7}
(Poland) Piotr Gadomski (Poland) M Kowalczyk	1	6	[10]
2	(Argentina) F Bagnis (Argentina) H Zeballos	6	2	[4]

Quarterfinals
1	(Australia) C Ebelthite (Australia) A Feeney	6	3	[10]
(South Africa) J Coetzee (Australia) S Kadir	4	6	[5]
4	(Germany) D Meffert (Germany) B Phau	6	7
(Germany) Patrick Pradella (Germany) J-L Struff	1	5
(Argentina) P Galdón (Argentina) A Molteni	7^{7}	7^{7}
3	(Austria) M Slanar (Germany) S Stadler	6^{2}	6^{4}
(Russia) T Gabashvili (Russia) A Kuznetsov	6	4	[14]
(Poland) Piotr Gadomski (Poland) M Kowalczyk	2	6	[12]

Semifinals
1	(Australia) C Ebelthite (Australia) A Feeney	1	4
4	(Germany) D Meffert (Germany) B Phau	6	6
(Argentina) P Galdón (Argentina) A Molteni	2	3
(Russia) T Gabashvili (Russia) A Kuznetsov	6	6

Final
4	(Germany) D Meffert (Germany) B Phau	6	6
(Russia) T Gabashvili (Russia) A Kuznetsov	4	3
