= 2013 Siberia Cup – Singles =

Singles
- 2013 Siberia Cup

Final
- Champion: (Kazakhstan) Andrey Golubev
- Runner-up: (Russia) Andrey Kuznetsov
- Score: 6–4, 6–3

Events
Singles	Doubles
← 2012 ·	Siberia Cup

Evgeny Donskoy was the defending champion, but lost to Illya Marchenko in the quarterfinals.

Andrey Golubev won the title, defeating Andrey Kuznetsov in the final, 6–4, 6–3.

== Seeds ==
1. (Russia) Teymuraz Gabashvili (semifinals)
2. (Russia) Evgeny Donskoy (quarterfinals)
3. (Kazakhstan) Andrey Golubev (champion)
4. (Russia) Andrey Kuznetsov (final)
5. (Ukraine) Illya Marchenko (semifinals)
6. (Moldova) Radu Albot (first round)
7. (Russia) Konstantin Kravchuk (second round)
8. (Russia) Alexander Kudryavtsev (first round)

== Draw ==
=== Key ===
- Q = Qualifier
- WC = Wild card
- LL = Lucky loser
- Alt = Alternate
- SE = Special exempt
- PR = Protected ranking
- ITF = ITF entry
- JE = Junior exempt
- w/o = Walkover
- r = Retired
- d = Defaulted
- SR = Special ranking

=== Finals ===
Semifinals
1	(Russia) Teymuraz Gabashvili	4	2
3	(Kazakhstan) Andrey Golubev	6	6
4	(Russia) Andrey Kuznetsov	6	3	6
5	(Ukraine) Illya Marchenko	4	6	3

Final
3	(Kazakhstan) Andrey Golubev	6	6
4	(Russia) Andrey Kuznetsov	4	3

=== Top half ===
First round
1	(Russia) T Gabashvili	7^{7}	6
(Spain) A Artuñedo Martínavarr	6^{5}	2
(Russia) I Nedelko	3	2
(Czech Republic) R Jebavý	6	6
(Belarus) S Betov	4	3^{r}
(Belarus) A Bury	6	5
(Poland) G Panfil	6	6
6	(Moldova) R Albot	4	2
3	(Kazakhstan) A Golubev	7	6
(Russia) A Karatsev	5	4
WC	(Russia) Robert Ziganshin	3	1
WC	(Russia) R Muzaev	6	6
Q	(Belarus) D Zhyrmont	6	6^{0}	3
(Croatia) A Pavić	4	7^{7}	6
Q	(Russia) Anton Galkin	2	2
7	(Russia) K Kravchuk	6	6

Second round
1	(Russia) T Gabashvili	6	6
(Czech Republic) R Jebavý	3	1
(Belarus) A Bury	6	7^{7}
(Poland) G Panfil	4	6^{0}
3	(Kazakhstan) A Golubev	7^{7}	6
WC	(Russia) R Muzaev	6^{4}	2
(Croatia) A Pavić	6	6
7	(Russia) K Kravchuk	4	3

Quarterfinals
1	(Russia) T Gabashvili	6	7^{7}
(Belarus) A Bury	4	6^{5}
3	(Kazakhstan) A Golubev	6	6
(Croatia) A Pavić	4	4

Semifinals
1	(Russia) T Gabashvili	4	2
3	(Kazakhstan) A Golubev	6	6

=== Bottom half ===
First round
8	(Russia) A Kudryavtsev	6^{2}	6^{5}
(Belarus) E Gerasimov	7^{7}	7^{7}
(Poland) Piotr Gadomski	7^{7}	5	6
(France) Jules Marie	6^{5}	7	3
Q	(Russia) V Rudnev	5	7^{7}	6
(Slovakia) Adrian Sikora	7	6^{4}	4
WC	(Russia) Dmitri Perevoshchikov	4	2
4	(Russia) A Kuznetsov	6	6
5	(Ukraine) I Marchenko	6	6
(Russia) V Baluda	4	1
WC	(Russia) S Vovk	6	3	2
(Ukraine) A Smirnov	2	6	6
(Russia) M Biryukov	2	6^{8}
Q	(Russia) D Matsukevich	6	7^{10}
(Russia) Alexander Lobkov	2	2
2	(Russia) E Donskoy	6	6

Second round
(Belarus) E Gerasimov	6	6
(Poland) P Gadomski	3	2
(Russia) V Rudnev	6^{6}	0^{r}
4	(Russia) A Kuznetsov	7^{8}	2
5	(Ukraine) I Marchenko	6	6
(Ukraine) A Smirnov	2	3
Q	(Russia) D Matsukevich	4	6	6^{5}
2	(Russia) E Donskoy	6	1	7^{7}

Quarterfinals
(Belarus) E Gerasimov	4	2
4	(Russia) A Kuznetsov	6	6
5	(Ukraine) I Marchenko	6	4	7^{7}
2	(Russia) E Donskoy	2	6	6^{3}

Semifinals
4	(Russia) A Kuznetsov	6	3	6
5	(Ukraine) I Marchenko	4	6	3
