= 2011 Siberia Cup – Singles =

Singles
- 2011 Siberia Cup

Final
- Champion: (Russia) Yulia Putintseva
- Runner-up: (Ukraine) Elina Svitolina
- Score: 6–2, 6–4

Events
Singles	Doubles
← 2010 ·	Siberia Cup	· 2012 →

This was the first edition of the tournament.

Yulia Putintseva won the title defeating Elina Svitolina in the final 6–2, 6–4.

== Seeds ==
1. (Ukraine) Olga Savchuk (semifinals)
2. (Serbia) Aleksandra Krunić (first round)
3. (Russia) Yulia Putintseva (champion)
4. (Ukraine) Elina Svitolina (final)
5. (Ukraine) Irina Buryachok (quarterfinals)
6. (Ukraine) Veronika Kapshay (quarterfinals)
7. (Ukraine) Valentyna Ivakhnenko (second round)
8. (Russia) Daria Gavrilova (quarterfinals)

== Draw ==
=== Key ===
- Q = Qualifier
- WC = Wild card
- LL = Lucky loser
- Alt = Alternate
- SE = Special exempt
- PR = Protected ranking
- ITF = ITF entry
- JE = Junior exempt
- w/o = Walkover
- r = Retired
- d = Defaulted
- SR = Special ranking

=== Finals ===
Semifinals
1	(Ukraine) Olga Savchuk	3	4
3	(Russia) Yulia Putintseva	6	6
4	(Ukraine) Elina Svitolina	6	5	6
(Belarus) Polina Pekhova	2	7	3

Final
3	(Russia) Yulia Putintseva	6	6
4	(Ukraine) Elina Svitolina	2	4

=== Top half ===
First round
1	(Ukraine) O Savchuk	6	6
(Russia) A Kushkhova	1	1
(Russia) D Mironova	6	1	1
SR	(Belarus) D Kustova	3	6	6
Q	(Russia) O Doroshina	6	4	2
(Russia) M Melnikova	2	6	6
(Russia) A Artamonova	1	4
8/WC	(Russia) D Gavrilova	6	6
3	(Russia) Y Putintseva	6	6
(Ukraine) N Kichenok	3	4
(Kyrgyzstan) B Duvanaeva	5	3
(Russia) E Yashina	7	6
WC	(Russia) N Zhuravleva	1	1
(Russia) E Pashkova	6	6
Q	(Russia) P Monova	4	4
6	(Ukraine) V Kapshay	6	6

Second round
1	(Ukraine) O Savchuk	6	6
SR	(Belarus) D Kustova	4	3
(Russia) M Melnikova	6^{8}	4
8/WC	(Russia) D Gavrilova	7^{10}	6
3	(Russia) Y Putintseva	6	6
(Russia) E Yashina	4	2
(Russia) E Pashkova	1	1
6	(Ukraine) V Kapshay	6	6

Quarterfinals
1	(Ukraine) O Savchuk	6	6
8/WC	(Russia) D Gavrilova	2	1
3	(Russia) Y Putintseva	6	6
6	(Ukraine) V Kapshay	1	1

Semifinals
1	(Ukraine) O Savchuk	3	4
3	(Russia) Y Putintseva	6	6

=== Bottom half ===
First round
7	(Ukraine) V Ivakhnenko	4	6	6
(Russia) M Shamayko	6	3	4
Q	(Russia) E Semenova	1	3
(Ukraine) L Kichenok	6	6
WC	(Russia) N Khrisanova	2	1
(Ukraine) A Vasylyeva	6	6
(Ukraine) K Kozlova	1	2
4	(Ukraine) E Svitolina	6	6
5	(Ukraine) I Buryachok	6	0	6
Q	(Belarus) S Pirazhenka	3	6	4
(Russia) V Kan	6^{1}	6^{3}
(Netherlands) L van Riet	7^{7}	7^{7}
(Russia) A Gabueva	5	2
(Belarus) P Pekhova	7	6
WC	(Russia) M Gasparyan	7	6
2	(Serbia) A Krunić	5	1

Second round
7	(Ukraine) V Ivakhnenko	3	6	3
(Ukraine) L Kichenok	6	2	6
(Ukraine) A Vasylyeva	6	3	3
4	(Ukraine) E Svitolina	4	6	6
5	(Ukraine) I Buryachok	6	6
(Netherlands) L van Riet	2	1
(Belarus) P Pekhova	6	1	7^{7}
WC	(Russia) M Gasparyan	4	6	6^{5}

Quarterfinals
(Ukraine) L Kichenok	7	4	4
4	(Ukraine) E Svitolina	5	6	6
5	(Ukraine) I Buryachok	3	7	2
(Belarus) P Pekhova	6	5	6

Semifinals
4	(Ukraine) E Svitolina	6	5	6
(Belarus) P Pekhova	2	7	3
