= 2013 Siberia Cup – Doubles =

Doubles
- 2013 Siberia Cup

Final
- Champions: (Belarus) Sergey Betov (Belarus) Alexander Bury
- Runners-up: (Ukraine) Ivan Anikanov (Croatia) Ante Pavić
- Score: 6–4, 6–2

Events
Singles	Doubles
← 2012 ·	Siberia Cup

Ivo Klec and Andreas Siljeström were the defending champions but chose not to compete.

Sergey Betov and Alexander Bury won the title, defeating Ivan Anikanov and Ante Pavić in the final, 6–4, 6–2.

== Seeds ==
1. (Russia) Mikhail Elgin / (Slovakia) Michal Mertiňák (semifinals)
2. (Russia) Victor Baluda / (Russia) Konstantin Kravchuk (semifinals)
3. (Belarus) Sergey Betov / (Belarus) Alexander Bury (champions)
4. (Poland) Piotr Gadomski / (Poland) Grzegorz Panfil (quarterfinals)

== Draw ==
=== Key ===
- Q = Qualifier
- WC = Wild card
- LL = Lucky loser
- Alt = Alternate
- SE = Special exempt
- PR = Protected ranking
- ITF = ITF entry
- JE = Junior exempt
- w/o = Walkover
- r = Retired
- d = Defaulted
- SR = Special ranking

=== Draw ===
First round
1	(Russia) M Elgin (Slovakia) M Mertiňák	6	4	[10]
WC	(Russia) Vladislav Dubinsky (Russia) Alexander Lobkov	3	6	[6]
(Moldova) R Albot (Russia) D Matsukevich	6	3	[10]
(Belarus) Y Shyla (Belarus) A Vasilevski	3	6	[8]
3	(Belarus) S Betov (Belarus) A Bury	7	6
(Czech Republic) R Jebavý (Slovakia) Adrian Sikora	5	3
(Russia) I Nedelko (Russia) S Vovk	6^{4}	2
(Ukraine) I Marchenko (Ukraine) A Smirnov	7^{7}	6
(Ukraine) Ivan Anikanov (Croatia) A Pavić	w/o
(Russia) A Kudryavtsev (Russia) V Rudnev
WC	(Russia) Ronald Slobodchikov (Russia) Robert Ziganshin	3	6	[4]
4	(Poland) Piotr Gadomski (Poland) G Panfil	6	3	[10]
(Belarus) E Gerasimov (Belarus) D Zhyrmont	6	6
WC	(Spain) A Artuñedo Martínavarr (Russia) D Sitak	3	4
(Russia) A Karatsev (Russia) R Muzaev	7^{12}	1	[5]
2	(Russia) V Baluda (Russia) K Kravchuk	6^{10}	6	[10]

Quarterfinals
1	(Russia) M Elgin (Slovakia) M Mertiňák	6	6
(Moldova) R Albot (Russia) D Matsukevich	1	2
3	(Belarus) S Betov (Belarus) A Bury	6	6
(Ukraine) I Marchenko (Ukraine) A Smirnov	4	4
(Ukraine) I Anikanov (Croatia) A Pavić	6	6
4	(Poland) P Gadomski (Poland) G Panfil	2	4
(Belarus) E Gerasimov (Belarus) D Zhyrmont	5	1
2	(Russia) V Baluda (Russia) K Kravchuk	7	6

Semifinals
1	(Russia) M Elgin (Slovakia) M Mertiňák	3	6^{3}
3	(Belarus) S Betov (Belarus) A Bury	6	7^{7}
(Ukraine) I Anikanov (Croatia) A Pavić	6	2	[10]
2	(Russia) V Baluda (Russia) K Kravchuk	0	6	[7]

Final
3	(Belarus) S Betov (Belarus) A Bury	6	6
(Ukraine) I Anikanov (Croatia) A Pavić	4	2
