= 2011 Siberia Cup – Doubles =

Doubles
- 2011 Siberia Cup

Final
- Champions: (Belarus) Darya Kustova (Ukraine) Olga Savchuk
- Runners-up: (Russia) Natela Dzalamidze (Russia) Margarita Gasparyan
- Score: 6–0, 6–2

Events
Singles	Doubles
← 2010 ·	Siberia Cup	· 2012 →

This was the first edition of the tournament.

Darya Kustova and Olga Savchuk won the title defeating Natela Dzalamidze and Margarita Gasparyan in the final 6–0, 6–2.

== Seeds ==
1. (Ukraine) Lyudmyla Kichenok / (Ukraine) Nadiya Kichenok (first round)
2. (Belarus) Darya Kustova / (Ukraine) Olga Savchuk (champions)
3. (Ukraine) Valentyna Ivakhnenko / (Ukraine) Kateryna Kozlova (semifinals)
4. (Ukraine) Irina Buryachok / (Ukraine) Elina Svitolina (first round)

== Draw ==
=== Key ===
- Q = Qualifier
- WC = Wild card
- LL = Lucky loser
- Alt = Alternate
- SE = Special exempt
- PR = Protected ranking
- ITF = ITF entry
- JE = Junior exempt
- w/o = Walkover
- r = Retired
- d = Defaulted
- SR = Special ranking

=== Draw ===
First round
1	(Ukraine) L Kichenok (Ukraine) N Kichenok	6	3	[7]
(Russia) N Dzalamidze (Russia) M Gasparyan	4	6	[10]
(Belarus) L Marozava (Netherlands) L van Riet	6	4	[10]
(Armenia) A Amiraghyan (Russia) E Yashina	3	6	[8]
3	(Ukraine) V Ivakhnenko (Ukraine) K Kozlova	6	4	[10]
(Ukraine) V Kapshay (Russia) A Smolina	2	6	[5]
WC	(Russia) A Botova (Russia) N Zhuravleva	0	1
(Russia) E Pashkova (Ukraine) A Vasylyeva	6	6
(Serbia) A Krunić (Russia) M Shamayko	6	4	[9]
(Russia) A Artamonova (Russia) P Monova	2	6	[11]
WC	(Russia) O Doroshina (Russia) A Tarasova	6	6^{6}	[10]
4	(Ukraine) I Buryachok (Ukraine) E Svitolina	3	7^{8}	[3]
WC	(Russia) D Gavrilova (Russia) V Kan	4	6	[8]
(Russia) M Melnikova (Belarus) P Pekhova	6	2	[10]
(Russia) A Gabueva (Russia) Y Kalabina	1	2
2	(Belarus) D Kustova (Ukraine) O Savchuk	6	6

Quarterfinals
(Russia) N Dzalamidze (Russia) M Gasparyan	6	6
(Belarus) L Marozava (Netherlands) L van Riet	3	3
3	(Ukraine) V Ivakhnenko (Ukraine) K Kozlova	6	4	[10]
(Russia) E Pashkova (Ukraine) A Vasylyeva	4	6	[7]
(Russia) A Artamonova (Russia) P Monova	6	6
WC	(Russia) O Doroshina (Russia) A Tarasova	2	2
(Russia) M Melnikova (Belarus) P Pekhova	7	3	[3]
2	(Belarus) D Kustova (Ukraine) O Savchuk	5	6	[10]

Semifinals
(Russia) N Dzalamidze (Russia) M Gasparyan	6	6
3	(Ukraine) V Ivakhnenko (Ukraine) K Kozlova	4	2
(Russia) A Artamonova (Russia) P Monova	2	2
2	(Belarus) D Kustova (Ukraine) O Savchuk	6	6

Finals
(Russia) N Dzalamidze (Russia) M Gasparyan	0	2
2	(Belarus) D Kustova (Ukraine) O Savchuk	6	6
