= 2012 Lermontov Cup – Doubles =

Doubles
- 2012 Lermontov Cup

Final
- Champion: (Russia) Konstantin Kravchuk (Ukraine) Denys Molchanov
- Runner-up: (Kazakhstan) Andrey Golubev (Kazakhstan) Yuri Schukin
- Score: 6–3, 6–4

Events
Singles	Doubles
← 2011 ·	Lermontov Cup	· 2013 →

Konstantin Kravchuk and Denys Molchanov won the title, defeating Andrey Golubev and Yuri Schukin 6–3, 6–4 in the final.

== Seeds ==
1. (Russia) Konstantin Kravchuk / (Ukraine) Denys Molchanov (champions)
2. (Kazakhstan) Andrey Golubev / (Kazakhstan) Yuri Schukin (final)
3. (Croatia) Dino Marcan / (Croatia) Nikola Mektić (semifinals)
4. (Serbia) Nikola Ćirić / (Serbia) Boris Pašanski (quarterfinals)

== Draw ==
=== Key ===
- Q = Qualifier
- WC = Wild card
- LL = Lucky loser
- Alt = Alternate
- SE = Special exempt
- PR = Protected ranking
- ITF = ITF entry
- JE = Junior exempt
- w/o = Walkover
- r = Retired
- d = Defaulted
- SR = Special ranking

=== Draw ===
First round
1	(Russia) K Kravchuk (Ukraine) D Molchanov	6	6^{4}	[12]
WC	(Russia) Aslan Karatsev (Russia) Evgeny Karlovski	4	7^{7}	[10]
(Moldova) R Borvanov (Ukraine) O Nedovyesov	6	6
(Estonia) V Ivanov (Russia) I Nedelko	3	4
4	(Serbia) N Ćirić (Serbia) B Pašanski	6	7^{7}
(Croatia) T Androić (Bosnia and Herzegovina) D Džumhur	4	6^{3}
(Moldova) R Albot (Russia) A Kuznetsov	6	6
WC	(Russia) Vladimir Geller (Russia) D Marfinsky	0	1
WC	(Russia) Victor Baluda (Russia) S Strelkov	6	6^{1}	[10]
(Russia) Sergei Krotiouk (Russia) Andrei Levine	3	7^{7}	[4]
(Czech Republic) Michal Konečný (Russia) A Kumantsov	5	6^{3}
3	(Croatia) D Marcan (Croatia) N Mektić	7	7^{7}
(Russia) Mikhail Fufygin (Russia) Vitali Reshetnikov	6	2	[3]
(Uzbekistan) F Dustov (Italy) T Fabbiano	3	6	[10]
(Italy) Enrico Becuzzi (Italy) P Lorenzi	2	3
2	(Kazakhstan) A Golubev (Kazakhstan) Y Schukin	6	6

Quarterfinals
1	(Russia) K Kravchuk (Ukraine) D Molchanov	4	6	[10]
(Moldova) R Borvanov (Ukraine) O Nedovyesov	6	4	[8]
4	(Serbia) N Ćirić (Serbia) B Pašanski	4	0
(Moldova) R Albot (Russia) A Kuznetsov	6	6
WC	(Russia) V Baluda (Russia) S Strelkov	7^{7}	4	[3]
3	(Croatia) D Marcan (Croatia) N Mektić	6^{1}	6	[10]
(Uzbekistan) F Dustov (Italy) T Fabbiano	1	5
2	(Kazakhstan) A Golubev (Kazakhstan) Y Schukin	6	7

Semifinals
1	(Russia) K Kravchuk (Ukraine) D Molchanov	7^{7}	7^{8}
(Moldova) R Albot (Russia) A Kuznetsov	6^{5}	6^{6}
3	(Croatia) D Marcan (Croatia) N Mektić	1	4
2	(Kazakhstan) A Golubev (Kazakhstan) Y Schukin	6	6

Final
1	(Russia) K Kravchuk (Ukraine) D Molchanov	6	6
2	(Kazakhstan) A Golubev (Kazakhstan) Y Schukin	3	4
