= 2013 Siberia Cup =

Professional tennis tournament, played on hard courts, in Tyumen, Russia

- Date: 18–24 November
- Edition: 2nd
- Surface: Hard
- Location: Tyumen, Russia

Champions

Singles
- (Kazakhstan) Andrey Golubev

Doubles
- (Belarus) Sergey Betov / (Belarus) Aliaksandr Bury
← 2012 ·	Siberia Cup

The 2013 Siberia Cup was a professional tennis tournament played on hard courts. It was the first edition of the tournament which was part of the 2013 ATP Challenger Tour. It took place in Tyumen, Russia between 18 and 24 November 2013.

== Singles main-draw entrants ==
=== Seeds ===
Country	Player	Rank^{1}	Seed
RUS	Teymuraz Gabashvili	84	1
RUS	Evgeny Donskoy	94	2
KAZ	Andrey Golubev	100	3
RUS	Andrey Kuznetsov	146	4
UKR	Illya Marchenko	156	5
MDA	Radu Albot	171	6
RUS	Konstantin Kravchuk	182	7
RUS	Alexander Kudryavtsev	258	8

- ^{1} Rankings are as of November 11, 2013.

=== Other entrants ===
The following players received wildcards into the singles main draw:

- (Russia) Richard Muzaev
- (Russia) Dmitri Perevoshchikov
- (Russia) Stanislav Vovk
- (Russia) Robert Ziganshin

The following players received entry from the qualifying draw:

- (Russia) Anton Galkin
- (Russia) Denis Matsukevich
- (Russia) Valery Rudnev
- (Belarus) Dzmitry Zhyrmont

== Champions ==
=== Singles ===
- (Kazakhstan) Andrey Golubev def. (Russia) Andrey Kuznetsov, 6–4, 6–3

=== Doubles ===
- (Belarus) Sergey Betov / (Belarus) Aliaksandr Bury def. (Ukraine) Ivan Anikanov / (Croatia) Ante Pavić, 6–4, 6–2
