= 2012 I Marbella Open =

- Date: 12–18 November
- Edition: 1st
- Surface: Clay
- Location: Marbella, Spain

Champions

Singles
- (Spain) Albert Montañés

Doubles
- (Russia) Andrey Kuznetsov / (Spain) Javier Martí
I Marbella Open

The 2012 I Marbella Open was a professional tennis tournament played on clay courts. It was the first edition of the tournament which was part of the 2012 ATP Challenger Tour. It took place in Marbella, Spain between 12 and 18 November 2012.

== Singles main-draw entrants ==
=== Seeds ===
Country	Player	Rank^{1}	Seed
ESP	Daniel Gimeno Traver	70	1
RUS	Andrey Kuznetsov	75	2
ESP	Rubén Ramírez Hidalgo	96	3
SVN	Blaž Kavčič	99	4
ROU	Adrian Ungur	111	5
ESP	Albert Montañés	118	6
CRO	Antonio Veić	144	7
ESP	Íñigo Cervantes Huegun	148	8

- ^{1} Rankings are as of November 5, 2012.

=== Other entrants ===
The following players received wildcards into the singles main draw:

- (Spain) Manuel de Luis
- (Serbia) Marko Djokovic
- (Spain) Carlos Gómez-Herrera
- (Spain) Mario Vilella

The following players received entry from the qualifying draw:

- (Spain) Roberto Carballés Baena
- (Spain) David Pérez Sanz
- (Slovenia) Blaž Rola
- (Spain) Jordi Samper Montaña

== Champions ==
=== Singles ===
- (Spain) Albert Montañés def. (Spain) Daniel Muñoz de la Nava, 3–6, 6–2, 6–3

=== Doubles ===
- (Russia) Andrey Kuznetsov / (Spain) Javier Martí def. (Spain) Emilio Benfele Álvarez / (Italy) Adelchi Virgili, 6–3, 6–3
