= 2012 Lermontov Cup =

- Date: 24–30 September
- Edition: 1st
- Surface: Clay
- Location: Lermontov, Russia

Champions

Singles
- (Russia) Andrey Kuznetsov

Doubles
- (Russia) Konstantin Kravchuk / (Ukraine) Denys Molchanov
- Lermontov Cup

The 2012 Lermontov Cup was a professional tennis tournament played on clay courts. It was the first edition of the tournament which was part of the 2012 ATP Challenger Tour. It took place in Lermontov, Russia between 24 and 30 September 2012.

== Singles main draw entrants ==
=== Seeds ===
Country	Player	Rank^{1}	Seed
ITA	Paolo Lorenzi	70	1
RUS	Andrey Kuznetsov	116	2
ARG	Horacio Zeballos	119	3
RUS	Teymuraz Gabashvili	160	4
KAZ	Andrey Golubev	168	5
UKR	Ivan Sergeyev	176	6
BIH	Damir Džumhur	216	7
RUS	Konstantin Kravchuk	217	8

- ^{1} Rankings are as of September 17, 2012.

=== Other entrants ===
The following players received wildcards into the singles main draw:

- (Russia) Victor Baluda
- (Russia) Ruslan Chomaev
- (Russia) Ervand Gasparyan
- (Russia) Richard Muzaev

The following players received entry from the qualifying draw:

- (Croatia) Toni Androić
- (Australia) James Duckworth
- (Czech Republic) Michal Schmid
- (Kazakhstan) Yuri Schukin

== Champions ==
=== Singles ===
- (Russia) Andrey Kuznetsov def. (Uzbekistan) Farrukh Dustov, 6–7^{(7–9)}, 6–2, 6–2

=== Doubles ===
- (Russia) Konstantin Kravchuk / (Ukraine) Denys Molchanov def. (Kazakhstan) Andrey Golubev / (Kazakhstan) Yuri Schukin, 6–3, 6–4
