= 2012 Lermontov Cup – Singles =

Singles
- 2012 Lermontov Cup

Final
- Champion: (Russia) Andrey Kuznetsov
- Runner-up: (Uzbekistan) Farrukh Dustov
- Score: 6–7^{(7–9)}, 6–2, 6–2

Events
Singles	Doubles
- Lermontov Cup

Andrey Kuznetsov won the title, defeating Farrukh Dustov 6–7^{(7–9)}, 6–2, 6–2 in the final.

== Seeds ==
1. (Italy) Paolo Lorenzi (first round)
2. (Russia) Andrey Kuznetsov (champion)
3. (Argentina) Horacio Zeballos (second round)
4. (Russia) Teymuraz Gabashvili (second round)
5. (Kazakhstan) Andrey Golubev (quarterfinals)
6. (Ukraine) Ivan Sergeyev (quarterfinals)
7. (Bosnia and Herzegovina) Damir Džumhur (second round)
8. (Russia) Konstantin Kravchuk (second round)

== Draw ==
Key

- Q = Qualifier
- WC = Wild card
- LL = Lucky loser
- Alt = Alternate
- ITF = ITF entry
- PR = Protected ranking
- SR = Special ranking
- SE = Special exempt
- JE = Junior exempt
- JR = Junior Accelerator Programme entrant
- CO = College Accelerator Programme entrant
- NG = Next Gen Accelerator Program entrant
- w/o = Walkover
- r = Retired
- d = Defaulted

=== Finals ===
Semifinals
(Serbia) Boris Pašanski	1	6	5
(Uzbekistan) Farrukh Dustov	6	3	7
(Ukraine) Oleksandr Nedovyesov	7	6^{5}	2
2	(Russia) Andrey Kuznetsov	5	7^{7}	6

Final
(Uzbekistan) Farrukh Dustov	7^{9}	2	2
2	(Russia) Andrey Kuznetsov	6^{7}	6	6

=== Top half ===
First round
1	(Italy) P Lorenzi	6	3	4
WC	(Russia) Victor Baluda	3	6	6
WC	(Russia) Ruslan Chomaev	1	6	0
(Serbia) B Pašanski	6	3	6
WC	(Russia) Ervand Gasparyan	3	1
(Russia) A Kumantsov	6	6
(Canada) S Diez	4	3
6	(Ukraine) I Sergeyev	6	6
4	(Russia) T Gabashvili	6	6
Q	(Australia) J Duckworth	4	3
(Uzbekistan) F Dustov	6	7
(Slovakia) A Martin	4	5
Q	(Czech Republic) Michal Schmid	4
(Russia) E Kirillov	0^{r}
(Czech Republic) Michal Konečný	4	3
5	(Kazakhstan) A Golubev	6	6

Second round
WC	(Russia) V Baluda	6	5	1
(Serbia) B Pašanski	4	7	6
(Russia) A Kumantsov	3	4
6	(Ukraine) I Sergeyev	6	6
4	(Russia) T Gabashvili	1	5
(Uzbekistan) F Dustov	6	7
Q	(Czech Republic) M Schmid	1	0^{r}
5	(Kazakhstan) A Golubev	6	2

Quarterfinals
(Serbia) B Pašanski	6	7^{7}
6	(Ukraine) I Sergeyev	0	6^{5}
(Uzbekistan) F Dustov	6	6
5	(Kazakhstan) A Golubev	4	3

Semifinals
(Serbia) B Pašanski	1	6	5
(Uzbekistan) F Dustov	6	3	7

=== Bottom half ===
First round
8	(Russia) K Kravchuk	6	6
(Ukraine) D Molchanov	3	2
WC	(Russia) Richard Muzaev	4	2
Q	(Kazakhstan) Y Schukin	6	6
(Ukraine) O Nedovyesov	6	6
(Moldova) R Albot	4	4
(Serbia) N Ćirić	6^{6}	2
3	(Argentina) H Zeballos	7^{8}	6
7	(Bosnia and Herzegovina) D Džumhur	7	6
(Moldova) R Borvanov	5	3
(Croatia) N Mektić	2	6	4
(Italy) T Fabbiano	6	3	6
Q	(Croatia) T Androić	6^{3}	7^{7}	1^{r}
(Croatia) D Marcan	7^{7}	6^{4}	1
(Georgia (country)) Nikoloz Basilashvili	4	4
2	(Russia) A Kuznetsov	6	6

Second round
8	(Russia) K Kravchuk	7^{7}	3	3
Q	(Kazakhstan) Y Schukin	6^{2}	6	6
(Ukraine) O Nedovyesov	6	6
3	(Argentina) H Zeballos	4	4
7	(Bosnia and Herzegovina) D Džumhur	4	2
(Italy) T Fabbiano	6	6
(Croatia) D Marcan	7^{7}	4	6^{2}
2	(Russia) A Kuznetsov	6^{4}	6	7^{7}

Quarterfinals
Q	(Kazakhstan) Y Schukin	6^{3}	7^{8}	2
(Ukraine) O Nedovyesov	7^{7}	6^{6}	6
(Italy) T Fabbiano	6^{3}	6^{3}
2	(Russia) A Kuznetsov	7^{7}	7^{7}

Semifinals
(Ukraine) O Nedovyesov	5	7^{7}	2
2	(Russia) A Kuznetsov	7	6^{5}	6
