= 2012 I Marbella Open – Doubles =

Doubles
- 2012 I Marbella Open

Final
- Champions: (Russia) Andrey Kuznetsov (Spain) Javier Martí
- Runners-up: (Spain) Emilio Benfele Álvarez (Italy) Adelchi Virgili
- Score: 6–3, 6–3

Events
Singles	Doubles
I Marbella Open

Andrey Kuznetsov and Javier Martí won the title, defeating Emilio Benfele Álvarez and Adelchi Virgili 6–3, 6–3 in the final.

== Seeds ==
1. (Serbia) Nikola Ćirić / (Montenegro) Goran Tošić (first round)
2. (Spain) Daniel Muñoz de la Nava / (Spain) Rubén Ramírez Hidalgo (quarterfinals)
3. (Italy) Alessandro Motti / (Romania) Adrian Ungur (first round)
4. (Russia) Andrey Kuznetsov / (Spain) Javier Martí (champions)

== Draw ==
=== Key ===
- Q = Qualifier
- WC = Wild card
- LL = Lucky loser
- Alt = Alternate
- SE = Special exempt
- PR = Protected ranking
- ITF = ITF entry
- JE = Junior exempt
- w/o = Walkover
- r = Retired
- d = Defaulted
- SR = Special ranking

=== Draw ===
First round
1	(Serbia) N Ćirić (Montenegro) G Tošić	6	4	[11]
(Spain) E López-Pérez (Spain) J Samper-Montaña	2	6	[13]
(Croatia) T Androić (Croatia) A Veić	6	5	[10]
(Italy) T Fabbiano (Czech Republic) J Mertl	3	7	[7]
4	(Russia) A Kuznetsov (Spain) J Martí	6	6
(Serbia) M Djokovic (Spain) Carlos Gómez-Herrera	2	1
(Spain) I Cervantes Huegun (Canada) S Diez	3	1
(Slovakia) J Kovalík (Slovakia) A Martin	6	6
(Spain) Marc Giner (Spain) Oriol Roca Batalla	3	6	[8]
(Austria) Lukas Koncilia (Slovenia) B Rola	6	4	[10]
WC	(Spain) A Menéndez (Germany) Eric Scherer	4	6	[10]
3	(Italy) A Motti (Romania) A Ungur	6	4	[8]
WC	(United States) Sam Barnett (United States) K Kim	3	2
WC	(Spain) E Benfele Álvarez (Italy) Adelchi Virgili	6	6
(Netherlands) Romano Frantzen (Spain) S Gutiérrez Ferrol	1	2
2	(Spain) D Muñoz de la Nava (Spain) R Ramírez Hidalgo	6	6

Quarterfinals
(Spain) E López-Pérez (Spain) J Samper-Montaña	3	2
(Croatia) T Androić (Croatia) A Veić	6	6
4	(Russia) A Kuznetsov (Spain) J Martí	7^{7}	6
(Slovakia) J Kovalík (Slovakia) A Martin	6^{2}	2
(Austria) L Koncilia (Slovenia) B Rola	4	4
WC	(Spain) A Menéndez (Germany) E Scherer	6	6
WC	(Spain) E Benfele Álvarez (Italy) A Virgili	2	7	[10]
2	(Spain) D Muñoz de la Nava (Spain) R Ramírez Hidalgo	6	5	[5]

Semifinals
(Croatia) T Androić (Croatia) A Veić	3	1
4	(Russia) A Kuznetsov (Spain) J Martí	6	6
WC	(Spain) A Menéndez (Germany) E Scherer	6^{5}	2
WC	(Spain) E Benfele Álvarez (Italy) A Virgili	7^{7}	6

Final
4	(Russia) A Kuznetsov (Spain) J Martí	6	6
WC	(Spain) E Benfele Álvarez (Italy) A Virgili	3	3
