= 2011 Siberia Cup =

- Date: 26–30 December
- Edition: 1st
- Location: Tyumen, Russia

Champions

Singles
- (Russia) Yulia Putintseva

Doubles
- (Belarus) Darya Kustova / (Ukraine) Olga Savchuk
- Siberia Cup

The 2011 Siberia Cup was a professional tennis tournament played on Hard courts. It was the first edition of the tournament which was part of the 2011 ITF Women's Circuit. It took place in Tyumen, Russia between 26 and 30 December.

== WTA entrants ==
=== Seeds ===
Country	Player	Rank^{1}	Seed
UKR	Olga Savchuk	197	1
SRB	Aleksandra Krunić	221	2
RUS	Yulia Putintseva	243	3
UKR	Elina Svitolina	252	4
UKR	Irina Buryachok	260	5
UKR	Veronika Kapshay	270	6
UKR	Valentyna Ivakhnenko	301	7
RUS	Daria Gavrilova	337	8

- ^{1} Rankings are as of December 19, 2011.

=== Other entrants ===
The following players received wildcards into the singles main draw:

- (Russia) Margarita Gasparyan
- (Russia) Daria Gavrilova
- (Russia) Nina Khrisanova
- (Russia) Natalia Zhuravleva

The following players received entry from the qualifying draw:

- (Russia) Olga Doroshina
- (Russia) Polina Monova
- (Belarus) Sviatlana Pirazhenka
- (Russia) Ekaterina Semenova

The following player received entry from a Special Ranking spot:

- (Belarus) Darya Kustova

== Champions ==
=== Singles ===
(Russia) Yulia Putintseva def. (Ukraine) Elina Svitolina, 6–2, 6–4

=== Doubles ===
(Belarus) Darya Kustova / (Ukraine) Olga Savchuk def. (Russia) Natela Dzalamidze / (Russia) Margarita Gasparyan, 6–0, 6–2
