= 2011 Internationaler Apano Cup =

- Date: 25–31 July
- Edition: 1st
- Location: Dortmund, Germany

Champions

Singles
- (Argentina) Leonardo Mayer

Doubles
- (Germany) Dominik Meffert / (Germany) Björn Phau
Internationaler Apano Cup	· 2012 →

The 2011 Internationaler Apano Cup was a professional tennis tournament played on clay courts. It was the first edition of the tournament which was part of the 2011 ATP Challenger Tour. It took place in Dortmund, Germany between 25 and 31 July 2011.

== ATP entrants ==
=== Seeds ===
Country	Player	Rank^{1}	Seed
ARG	Horacio Zeballos	107	1
NED	Thomas Schoorel	121	2
GER	Björn Phau	133	3
RUS	Teymuraz Gabashvili	134	4
SVK	Martin Kližan	140	5
GER	Simon Greul	142	6
BLR	Uladzimir Ignatik	154	7
GER	~~Julian Reister~~	~~155~~	~~8~~
SRB	Nikola Ćirić	158	9

- ^{1} Rankings are as of July 18, 2011.

=== Other entrants ===
The following players received wildcards into the singles main draw:

- (Germany) Nils Langer
- (Germany) Daniel Masur
- (Germany) Marvin Netuschil
- (Austria) Nicolas Reissig

The following players received entry from the qualifying draw:

- (Belgium) Maxime Authom
- (Brazil) André Ghem
- (France) Maxime Teixeira
- (Netherlands) Nick van der Meer

The following players received entry from the qualifying draw as a lucky loser:

- (Argentina) Marco Trungelliti

== Champions ==
=== Singles ===
(Argentina) Leonardo Mayer def. (Netherlands) Thomas Schoorel, 6–3, 6–2

=== Doubles ===
(Germany) Dominik Meffert / (Germany) Björn Phau def. (Russia) Teymuraz Gabashvili / (Russia) Andrey Kuznetsov, 6–4, 6–3
