= I Marbella Open =

Defunct tennis tournament
- Location: Marbella, Spain
- Category: ATP Challenger Tour
- Surface: Clay
- Draw: 32S/16Q/16D
- Prize money: €30,000+H
- Website: Website

The I Marbella Open was a tennis tournament held in Marbella, Spain in 2012. The event wa part of the ATP Challenger Tour and was played on clay courts.

== Past finals ==
=== Singles ===
Year	Champion	Runner-up	Score	Ref.
2012	(Spain) Albert Montañés	(Spain) Daniel Muñoz de la Nava	3–6, 6–2, 6–3	

=== Doubles ===
Year	Champions	Runners-up	Score	Ref.
2012	(Russia) Andrey Kuznetsov (Spain) Javier Martí	(Spain) Emilio Benfele Álvarez (Italy) Adelchi Virgili	6–3, 6–3	
