= 2021 President's Cup II – Doubles =

Doubles
- 2021 President's Cup II

Final
- Champions: (Chinese Taipei) Hsu Yu-hsiou (Zimbabwe) Benjamin Lock
- Runners-up: (Ukraine) Oleksii Krutykh (Kazakhstan) Grigoriy Lomakin
- Score: 6–3, 6–4

Events
Singles	Doubles
← 2021 ·	President's Cup	· 2022 →

Hsu Yu-hsiou and Benjamin Lock were the defending champions and successfully defended their title, defeating Oleksii Krutykh and Grigoriy Lomakin 6–3, 6–4 in the final.

== Seeds ==
1. (Canada) Peter Polansky / (Ukraine) Sergiy Stakhovsky (semifinals)
2. (Russia) Pavel Kotov / (Ukraine) Vladyslav Manafov (first round, withdrew)
3. (Russia) Artem Dubrivnyy / (Kazakhstan) Denis Yevseyev (first round)
4. (Chinese Taipei) Hsu Yu-hsiou / (Zimbabwe) Benjamin Lock (champions)

== Draw ==
=== Key ===
- Q = Qualifier
- WC = Wild card
- LL = Lucky loser
- Alt = Alternate
- SE = Special exempt
- PR = Protected ranking
- ITF = ITF entry
- JE = Junior exempt
- w/o = Walkover
- r = Retired
- d = Defaulted
- SR = Special ranking

First round
(Uzbekistan) S Fayziev (Greece) M Kalovelonis	6	3	[8]
WC	(Kazakhstan) T Khabibulin (Kazakhstan) B Zhukayev	3	6	[10]
3	(Russia) A Dubrivnyy (Kazakhstan) D Yevseyev	3	2
(Ukraine) O Krutykh (Kazakhstan) G Lomakin	6	6
WC	(Kazakhstan) Kirill Kolganov (Russia) Maksim Maslov	4	4
WC	(Kazakhstan) Danil Ozernoy (Kazakhstan) Dostanbek Tashbulatov	6	6
(South Korea) Y-s Chung (Uzbekistan) K Sultanov	6	6
(Italy) A Bega (France) C Denolly	4	2
(United Kingdom) J Clarke (Turkey) E Kırkın
4	(Chinese Taipei) Y-h Hsu (Zimbabwe) B Lock	w/o
(Russia) Alexander Igoshin (Russia) I Nedelko	6^{0}	5
(Australia) J Kubler (Australia) A Santillan	7^{7}	7
(Russia) D Golubev (Russia) A Zakharov	w/o
2	(Russia) P Kotov (Ukraine) V Manafov

Quarterfinals
1	(Canada) P Polansky (Ukraine) S Stakhovsky	6	6
WC	(Kazakhstan) T Khabibulin (Kazakhstan) B Zhukayev	4	2
(Ukraine) O Krutykh (Kazakhstan) G Lomakin	6	6
WC	(Kazakhstan) D Ozernoy (Kazakhstan) D Tashbulatov	2	1
(South Korea) Y-s Chung (Uzbekistan) K Sultanov
4	(Chinese Taipei) Y-h Hsu (Zimbabwe) B Lock	w/o
(Australia) J Kubler (Australia) A Santillan
(Russia) D Golubev (Russia) A Zakharov	w/o

Semifinals
1	(Canada) P Polansky (Ukraine) S Stakhovsky	3	7^{9}	[7]
(Ukraine) O Krutykh (Kazakhstan) G Lomakin	6	6^{7}	[10]
4	(Chinese Taipei) Y-h Hsu (Zimbabwe) B Lock	6	6
(Russia) D Golubev (Russia) A Zakharov	1	1

Final
(Ukraine) O Krutykh (Kazakhstan) G Lomakin	3	4
4	(Chinese Taipei) Y-h Hsu (Zimbabwe) B Lock	6	6
