= Lermontov Cup =

- 2012 Lermontov Cup

ATP Challenger Tour
- Location: Lermontov, Russia
- Category: ATP Challenger Tour
- Surface: Clay
- Draw: 32S/16Q/16D
- Prize money: €50,000+H

The Lermontov Cup is a tennis tournament held in Lermontov, Russia since 2012. The event is part of the ATP Challenger Tour and is played on clay courts.

== Past finals ==
=== Singles ===
Year	Champion	Runner-up	Score
2012	(Russia) Andrey Kuznetsov	(Uzbekistan) Farrukh Dustov	6–7^{(7–9)}, 6–2, 6–2

=== Doubles ===
Year	Champions	Runners-up	Score
2012	(Russia) Konstantin Kravchuk (Ukraine) Denys Molchanov	(Kazakhstan) Andrey Golubev (Kazakhstan) Yuri Schukin	6–3, 6–4
