= 2021 President's Cup II =

Tennis tournament

- Date: 19–25 July 2021
- Edition: 16th
- Surface: Hard
- Location: Nur-Sultan, Kazakhstan

Champions

Singles
- (Russia) Andrey Kuznetsov

Doubles
- (Chinese Taipei) Hsu Yu-hsiou / (Zimbabwe) Benjamin Lock
| ← 2021 · | President's Cup | · 2022 → |

The 2021 President's Cup II was a professional tennis tournament played on outdoor hard courts. It was the sixteenth edition of the tournament which was part of the 2021 ATP Challenger Tour. It took place in Nur-Sultan, Kazakhstan between 19 and 25 July 2021.

== Singles main-draw entrants ==
=== Seeds ===
| Country | Player | Rank^{1} | Seed |
|---|---|---|---|
| ~~RUS~~ | ~~Roman Safiullin~~ | ~~159~~ | ~~1~~ |
| UKR | Sergiy Stakhovsky | 226 | 2 |
| GBR | Jay Clarke | 243 | 3 |
| FRA | Hugo Grenier | 253 | 4 |
| CAN | Peter Polansky | 254 | 5 |
| NED | Jesper de Jong | 263 | 6 |
| TPE | Tseng Chun-hsin | 265 | 7 |
| TPE | Wu Tung-lin | 268 | 8 |

- ^{1} Rankings are as of 12 July 2021.

=== Other entrants ===
The following players received wildcards into the singles main draw:

- (Kazakhstan) Grigoriy Lomakin
- (Kazakhstan) Dostanbek Tashbulatov
- (Kazakhstan) Beibit Zhukayev

The following players received entry from the qualifying draw:

- (Russia) Artem Dubrivnyy
- (Ukraine) Oleksii Krutykh
- (Israel) Edan Leshem
- (Zimbabwe) Benjamin Lock

The following player received entry as a lucky loser:

- (Turkey) Ergi Kırkın

== Champions ==
=== Singles ===
- (Russia) Andrey Kuznetsov def. (Australia) Jason Kubler 6–3, 2–1 ret.

=== Doubles ===
- (Chinese Taipei) Hsu Yu-hsiou / (Zimbabwe) Benjamin Lock def. (Ukraine) Oleksii Krutykh / (Kazakhstan) Grigoriy Lomakin 6–3, 6–4.
