= 2021 President's Cup II – Singles =

Singles
- 2021 President's Cup II

Final
- Champion: (Russia) Andrey Kuznetsov
- Runner-up: (Australia) Jason Kubler
- Score: 6–3, 2–1 ret.

Events
Singles	Doubles
← 2021 ·	President's Cup	· 2022 →

Max Purcell was the defending champion but chose not to defend his title.

Andrey Kuznetsov won the title after Jason Kubler retired trailing 3–6, 1–2 in the final.

== Seeds ==
1. (Russia) Roman Safiullin (withdrew)
2. (Ukraine) Sergiy Stakhovsky (second round)
3. (United Kingdom) Jay Clarke (first round)
4. (France) Hugo Grenier (quarterfinals)
5. (Canada) Peter Polansky (quarterfinals)
6. (Netherlands) Jesper de Jong (second round)
7. (Chinese Taipei) Tseng Chun-hsin (second round)
8. (Chinese Taipei) Wu Tung-lin (first round)

== Draw ==
=== Key ===
- Q = Qualifier
- WC = Wild card
- LL = Lucky loser
- Alt = Alternate
- SE = Special exempt
- PR = Protected ranking
- ITF = ITF entry
- JE = Junior exempt
- w/o = Walkover
- r = Retired
- d = Defaulted
- SR = Special ranking

=== Finals ===
Semifinals
(Russia) Pavel Kotov	2	7^{7}	4
(Russia) Andrey Kuznetsov	6	6^{4}	6
(Australia) Jason Kubler	6	6
Q	(Ukraine) Oleksii Krutykh	1	3

Final
(Russia) Andrey Kuznetsov	6	2
(Australia) Jason Kubler	3	1^{r}

=== Top half ===
First round
LL	(Turkey) E Kırkın	2	3
(United Kingdom) R Peniston	6	6
(Italy) A Bega	3	6	3
(Chinese Taipei) Y-h Hsu	6	1	6
(Russia) P Kotov	3	6	6
Q	(Israel) E Leshem	6	1	4
(Kazakhstan) D Yevseyev	6	0	3
6	(Netherlands) J de Jong	4	6	6
3	(United Kingdom) J Clarke	6^{6}	4
(Russia) A Kuznetsov	7^{8}	6
WC	(Kazakhstan) B Zhukayev	6	6
(Monaco) L Catarina	2	4
(Russia) A Zakharov	0	2
(Tunisia) M Jaziri	6	6
Q	(Russia) A Dubrivnyy	5	6^{5}
5	(Canada) P Polansky	7	7^{7}

Second round
(United Kingdom) R Peniston	6	6
(Chinese Taipei) Y-h Hsu	3	4
(Russia) P Kotov	6	7^{7}
6	(Netherlands) J de Jong	3	6^{3}
(Russia) A Kuznetsov	6	7
WC	(Kazakhstan) B Zhukayev	2	5
(Tunisia) M Jaziri	6	5	6^{4}
5	(Canada) P Polansky	3	7	7^{7}

Quarterfinals
(United Kingdom) R Peniston	4	2
(Russia) P Kotov	6	6
(Russia) A Kuznetsov	6	3	6
5	(Canada) P Polansky	2	6	2

Semifinals
(Russia) P Kotov	2	7^{7}	4
(Russia) A Kuznetsov	6	6^{4}	6

=== Bottom half ===
First round
7	(Chinese Taipei) C-h Tseng	6	6
(France) C Denolly	4	4
(Australia) J Kubler	6	7
(Uzbekistan) K Sultanov	3	5
WC	(Kazakhstan) Dostanbek Tashbulatov	3	2
(Russia) I Nedelko	6	6
(South Korea) Y-s Chung	7^{7}	3	1
4	(France) H Grenier	6^{5}	6	6
8	(Chinese Taipei) T-l Wu	2	2
Q	(Ukraine) O Krutykh	6	6
(Bosnia and Herzegovina) M Bašić	6	6
(Australia) A Santillan	2	2
WC	(Kazakhstan) G Lomakin	3	6^{3}
(United States) N Chappell	6	7^{7}
Q	(Zimbabwe) B Lock	3	6	5
2	(Ukraine) S Stakhovsky	6	3	7

Second round
7	(Chinese Taipei) C-h Tseng	6	3	5
(Australia) J Kubler	0	6	7
(Russia) I Nedelko	5^{r}
4	(France) H Grenier	6
Q	(Ukraine) O Krutykh	4	7	6
(Bosnia and Herzegovina) M Bašić	6	5	2
(United States) N Chappell	7^{7}	6
2	(Ukraine) S Stakhovsky	6^{4}	4

Quarterfinals
(Australia) J Kubler	7^{7}	6
4	(France) H Grenier	6^{4}	1
Q	(Ukraine) O Krutykh	3	6	7
(United States) N Chappell	6	3	5

Semifinals
(Australia) J Kubler	6	6
Q	(Ukraine) O Krutykh	1	3
