= 2012 Siberia Cup – Singles =

Singles
- 2012 Siberia Cup

Final
- Champion: (Russia) Evgeny Donskoy
- Runner-up: (Ukraine) Illya Marchenko
- Score: 6–7^{(6–8)}, 6–3, 6–2

Events
Singles	Doubles
- Siberia Cup

Evgeny Donskoy won the title by defeating Illya Marchenko 6–7^{(6–8)}, 6–3, 6–2 in the final.

== Seeds ==
1. (Russia) Evgeny Donskoy (champion)
2. (France) Josselin Ouanna (quarterfinals)
3. (Russia) Dmitry Tursunov (withdrew because of a leg injury)
4. (Ukraine) Ivan Sergeyev (semifinals)
5. (Ukraine) Illya Marchenko (final)
6. (Russia) Igor Kunitsyn (semifinals)
7. (Ukraine) Oleksandr Nedovyesov (first round)
8. (Kazakhstan) Evgeny Korolev (quarterfinals)
9. (Moldova) Radu Albot (second round)

== Draw ==
Key

- Q = Qualifier
- WC = Wild card
- LL = Lucky loser
- Alt = Alternate
- ITF = ITF entry
- PR = Protected ranking
- SR = Special ranking
- SE = Special exempt
- JE = Junior exempt
- JR = Junior Accelerator Programme entrant
- CO = College Accelerator Programme entrant
- NG = Next Gen Accelerator Program entrant
- w/o = Walkover
- r = Retired
- d = Defaulted

=== Finals ===
Semifinals
1	(Russia) Evgeny Donskoy	6	7^{7}
4	(Ukraine) Ivan Sergeyev	3	6^{2}
6	(Russia) Igor Kunitsyn	3	3
5	(Ukraine) Illya Marchenko	6	6

Final
1	(Russia) Evgeny Donskoy	6^{6}	6	6
5	(Ukraine) Illya Marchenko	7^{8}	3	2

=== Top half ===
First round
1	(Russia) E Donskoy	6	6
(Estonia) V Ivanov	2	2
(Poland) A Kapaś	3	5
(Romania) P-A Luncanu	6	7
(Russia) A Kumantsov	6	6
(Italy) M Marrai	1	1
(Latvia) A Juška	3	6	2
8	(Kazakhstan) E Korolev	6	3	6
4	(Ukraine) I Sergeyev	6	6
WC	(Russia) Vladislav Dubinsky	3	0
(Poland) G Panfil	4	4
(Russia) K Kravchuk	6	6
(Ukraine) D Molchanov	6	6
(Slovakia) I Klec	2	0
(Belarus) D Zhyrmont	6	6
7	(Ukraine) O Nedovyesov	0	4

Second round
1	(Russia) E Donskoy	4	7^{7}	6
(Romania) P-A Luncanu	6	6^{0}	2
(Russia) A Kumantsov	6	4	2
8	(Kazakhstan) E Korolev	4	6	6
4	(Ukraine) I Sergeyev	6	7
(Russia) K Kravchuk	4	5
(Ukraine) D Molchanov	6	6
(Belarus) D Zhyrmont	1	2

Quarterfinals
1	(Russia) E Donskoy	6	6
8	(Kazakhstan) E Korolev	1	2
4	(Ukraine) I Sergeyev	6	6
(Ukraine) D Molchanov	3	3

Semifinals
1	(Russia) E Donskoy	6	7^{7}
4	(Ukraine) I Sergeyev	3	6^{2}

=== Bottom half ===
First round
6	(Russia) I Kunitsyn	6	6
(Slovakia) Adrian Sikora	2	2
Q	(Belarus) A Bury	6^{4}	3
WC	(Russia) A Manegin	7^{7}	6
LL	(Czech Republic) Michal Schmid	2	2
Q	(Russia) Valery Rudnev	6	6
WC	(Russia) Robert Ziganshin	1	2
9	(Moldova) R Albot	6	6
5	(Ukraine) I Marchenko	6	6
Q	(Belarus) S Betov	0	3
(Kazakhstan) Y Schukin	6	2	3
(Georgia (country)) Nikoloz Basilashvili	2	6	6
Q	(Belarus) Egor Gerasimov	6	6
WC	(Uzbekistan) Nigmat Shofayziyev	2	2
(Russia) Alexander Lobkov	4	6	4
2	(France) J Ouanna	6	4	6

Second round
6	(Russia) I Kunitsyn	6	6
WC	(Russia) A Manegin	2	2
Q	(Russia) V Rudnev	6	7^{7}
9	(Moldova) R Albot	3	6^{1}
5	(Ukraine) I Marchenko	6
(Georgia (country)) N Basilashvili	5^{r}
Q	(Belarus) E Gerasimov	4	7	1
2	(France) J Ouanna	6	5	6

Quarterfinals
6	(Russia) I Kunitsyn	6	6
Q	(Russia) V Rudnev	1	2
5	(Ukraine) I Marchenko	7	6
2	(France) J Ouanna	5	4

Semifinals
6	(Russia) I Kunitsyn	3	3
5	(Ukraine) I Marchenko	6	6
