= Internationaler Apano Cup =

- 2011 Internationaler Apano Cup

Defunct tennis tournament
- Location: Dortmund, Germany
- Venue: Dortmunder Tennisklub
- Category: ATP Challenger Tour
- Surface: clay / Outdoors
- Draw: 32S/32Q/16D
- Prize money: €35,000+H

The Internationaler Apano Cup was a tennis tournament held in Dortmund, Germany from 2006 until 2013. The tournament was part of the ITF Men's Circuit except for the 2011 edition which was part of the ATP Challenger Tour.

== Past finals ==
=== Singles ===
Year	Champion	Runner-up	Score
2011	(Argentina) Leonardo Mayer	(Netherlands) Thomas Schoorel	6–3, 6–2

=== Doubles ===
Year	Champions	Runners-up	Score
2011	(Germany) Dominik Meffert (Germany) Björn Phau	(Russia) Teymuraz Gabashvili (Russia) Andrey Kuznetsov	6–4, 6–3
