= 2012 Siberia Cup – Doubles =

Doubles
- 2012 Siberia Cup

Final
- Champions: (Slovakia) Ivo Klec (Sweden) Andreas Siljeström
- Runners-up: (Russia) Konstantin Kravchuk (Ukraine) Denys Molchanov
- Score: 6–3, 6–2

Events
Singles	Doubles
- Siberia Cup

Ivo Klec and Andreas Siljeström won the title, defeating Konstantin Kravchuk and Denys Molchanov 6–3, 6–2 in the final.

== Seeds ==
1. (Russia) Konstantin Kravchuk / (Ukraine) Denys Molchanov (final)
2. (Russia) Mikhail Elgin / (Latvia) Andis Juška (quarterfinals)
3. (Ukraine) Oleksandr Nedovyesov / (Ukraine) Ivan Sergeyev (quarterfinals)
4. (Poland) Andriej Kapaś / (Poland) Grzegorz Panfil (first round)

== Draw ==
Key

- Q = Qualifier
- WC = Wild card
- LL = Lucky loser
- Alt = Alternate
- ITF = ITF entry
- PR = Protected ranking
- SR = Special ranking
- SE = Special exempt
- JE = Junior exempt
- JR = Junior Accelerator Programme entrant
- CO = College Accelerator Programme entrant
- NG = Next Gen Accelerator Program entrant
- w/o = Walkover
- r = Retired
- d = Defaulted

=== Draw ===
First round
1	(Russia) K Kravchuk (Ukraine) D Molchanov	6	6
(Belarus) Egor Gerasimov (Russia) Sergei Krotiouk	2	4
(Russia) A Kumantsov (France) J Ouanna	6	6
WC	(Russia) A Krasnoroutskiy (Russia) Anton Menagin	2	3
4	(Poland) A Kapaś (Poland) G Panfil	7	3	[4]
(Belarus) S Betov (Belarus) D Zhyrmont	5	6	[10]
(Russia) Vitaliy Kachanovskiy (Russia) Richard Muzaev	2	1
(Belarus) A Bury (Belarus) Yaraslau Shyla	6	6
WC	(Spain) F Roig (Russia) Robert Ziganshin	2	1
(Russia) Kirill Dmitriev (Kazakhstan) E Korolev	6	6
(Moldova) R Albot (Romania) P-A Luncanu	6^{9}	3
3	(Ukraine) O Nedovyesov (Ukraine) I Sergeyev	7^{11}	6
(Slovakia) I Klec (Sweden) A Siljeström	7^{7}	6
WC	(Russia) Vladislav Dubinsky (Russia) Alexander Lobkov	6^{4}	2
(Czech Republic) Michal Schmid (Slovakia) Adrian Sikora
2	(Russia) M Elgin (Latvia) A Juška	w/o

Quarterfinals
1	(Russia) K Kravchuk (Ukraine) D Molchanov	6	6
(Russia) A Kumantsov (France) J Ouanna	4	4
(Belarus) S Betov (Belarus) D Zhyrmont	6	6
(Belarus) A Bury (Belarus) Y Shyla	4	4
(Russia) K Dmitriev (Kazakhstan) E Korolev	6	3	[12]
3	(Ukraine) O Nedovyesov (Ukraine) I Sergeyev	3	6	[10]
(Slovakia) I Klec (Sweden) A Siljeström	4	6	[10]
2	(Russia) M Elgin (Latvia) A Juška	6	3	[4]

Semifinals
1	(Russia) K Kravchuk (Ukraine) D Molchanov	6	7^{7}
(Belarus) S Betov (Belarus) D Zhyrmont	3	6^{3}
(Russia) K Dmitriev (Kazakhstan) E Korolev	6	6^{6}	[6]
(Slovakia) I Klec (Sweden) A Siljeström	2	7^{8}	[10]

Final
1	(Russia) K Kravchuk (Ukraine) D Molchanov	3	2
(Slovakia) I Klec (Sweden) A Siljeström	6	6
