= 2012 Siberia Cup =

- Date: 19–25 November
- Edition: 1st
- Surface: Hard
- Location: Tyumen, Russia

Champions

Singles
- (Russia) Evgeny Donskoy

Doubles
- (Slovakia) Ivo Klec / (Sweden) Andreas Siljeström
- Siberia Cup

The 2012 Siberia Cup was a professional tennis tournament played on hard courts. It was the first edition of the tournament which was part of the 2012 ATP Challenger Tour. It took place in Tyumen, Russia between 19 and 25 November 2012.

== Singles main-draw entrants ==
=== Seeds ===
Country	Player	Rank^{1}	Seed
RUS	Evgeny Donskoy	98	1
FRA	Josselin Ouanna	123	2
RUS	~~Dmitry Tursunov~~	127	3
UKR	Ivan Sergeyev	161	4
UKR	Illya Marchenko	163	5
RUS	Igor Kunitsyn	168	6
UKR	Oleksandr Nedovyesov	206	7
KAZ	Evgeny Korolev	229	8

- ^{1} Rankings are as of November 12, 2012.

=== Other entrants ===
The following players received wildcards into the singles main draw:

- (Russia) Vladislav Dubinsky
- (Russia) Anton Manegin
- (Uzbekistan) Nigmat Shofayziyev
- (Russia) Robert Ziganshin

The following players received entry from the qualifying draw:

- (Belarus) Sergey Betov
- (Belarus) Aliaksandr Bury
- (Belarus) Egor Gerasimov
- (Russia) Valery Rudnev
- (Czech Republic) Michal Schmid (lucky loser)

== Champions ==
=== Singles ===
- (Russia) Evgeny Donskoy def. (Ukraine) Illya Marchenko, 6–7^{(6–8)}, 6–3, 6–2

=== Doubles ===
- (Slovakia) Ivo Klec / (Sweden) Andreas Siljeström def. (Russia) Konstantin Kravchuk / (Ukraine) Denys Molchanov, 6–3, 6–2
