= Lermontov (town) =

Lermontov Лермонтов
- Town
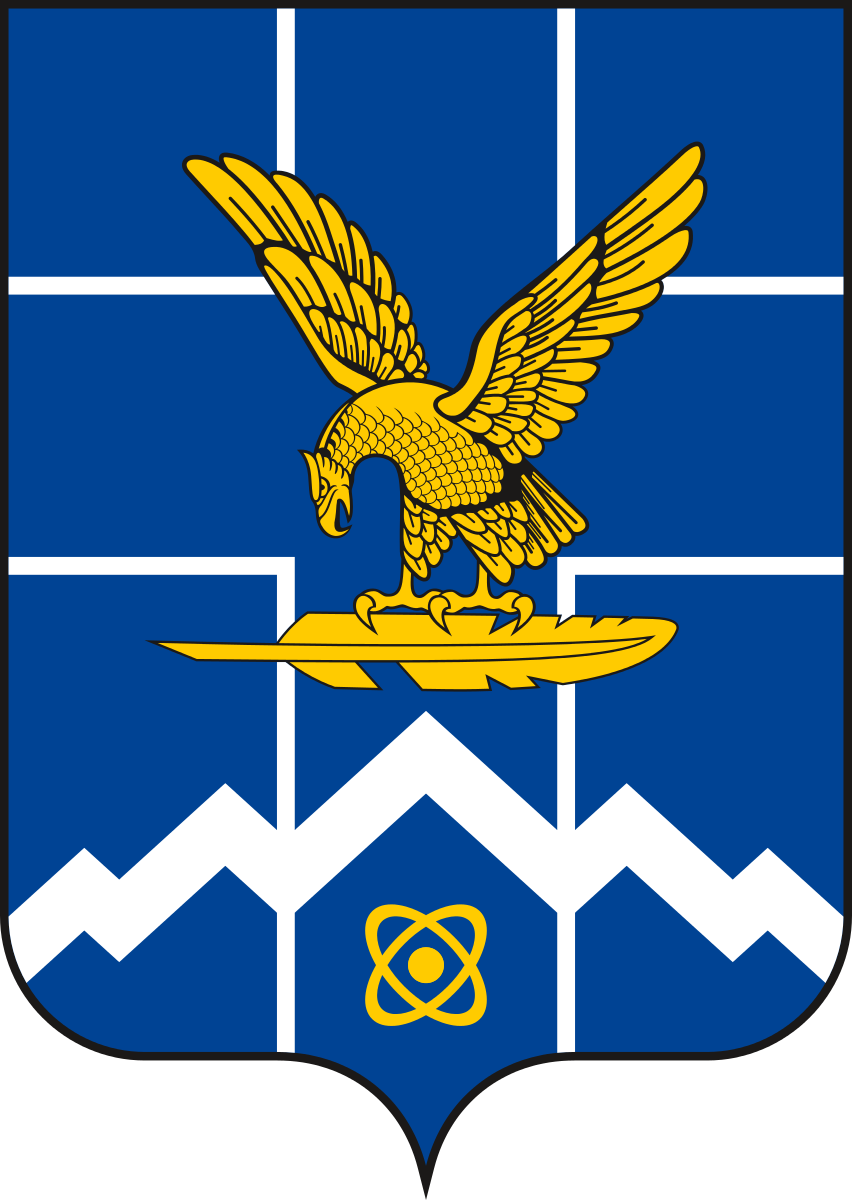
- Flag Coat of arms
- Interactive map of Lermontov
- Location of Lermontov Lermontov (Stavropol Krai)
- Coordinates: 44°07′N 42°59′E
- Country: Russia
- Federal subject: Stavropol Krai
- Founded: 1953
- Town status since: 1956
- Elevation: 650 m (2,130 ft)

Population (2010 Census)
  - Total: 22,541
  - Estimate (2023): 22,887 (+1.5%)

Administrative status
  - Subordinated to: town of krai significance of Lermontov
  - Capital of: town of krai significance of Lermontov

Municipal status
  - Urban okrug: Lermontov Urban Okrug
  - Capital of: Lermontov Urban Okrug
- Time zone: UTC+3 (MSK)
- Postal codes: 357340–357341, 357348
- OKTMO ID: 07718000001

Lermontov (Russian: Ле́рмонтов) is a town in Stavropol Krai, Russia, located on the mountainside of Beshtau. Population: 22,541 (2010 census); 22,964 (2002 census); 20,772 (1989 Soviet census); 16,500 (1973).

== History ==
It was named after Russian poet Mikhail Lermontov. It was granted town status in 1956.

Uranium mining boosted its growth. It was a closed town during the Soviet era. Uranium is no longer mined.

== Administrative and municipal status ==
Within the framework of administrative divisions, it is, together with one rural locality (the selo of Ostrogorka), incorporated as the town of krai significance of Lermontov—an administrative unit with the status equal to that of the districts. By 2022 it is planned to unite Lermontov and the village Bervinovka. As a municipal division, the town of krai significance of Lermontov is incorporated as Lermontov Urban Okrug.
