= Siberia Cup =

Defunct tennis tournament
- Location: Tyumen, Russia
- Surface: Hard
ATP Tour
- Category: ATP Challenger Tour
- Draw: 32S/30Q/16D
- Prize money: US$35,000+H
WTA Tour
- Category: ITF Women's Circuit 50K+H
- Draw: 32S/32Q/16D
- Prize money: US$50,000+H

The Siberia Cup was a professional tennis tournament played on indoor hardcourts. The event was part of the ATP Challenger Tour and the ITF Women's Circuit. It was classified as a $50k ITF Women's Circuit tournament, and was held in Tyumen, Russia, from 2011 to 2013.

== Past finals ==
=== Men's singles ===
Year	Champion	Runner-up	Score
2013	(Kazakhstan) Andrey Golubev	(Russia) Andrey Kuznetsov	6-4 6-3
2012	(Russia) Evgeny Donskoy	(Ukraine) Illya Marchenko	6–7^{(6–8)}, 6–3, 6–2

=== Men's doubles ===
Year	Champions	Runners-up	Score
2013	(Belarus) Sergey Betov (Belarus) Aliaksandr Bury	(Ukraine) Ivan Anikanov (Croatia) Ante Pavić	6–4, 6-2
2012	(Slovakia) Ivo Klec (Sweden) Andreas Siljeström	(Russia) Konstantin Kravchuk (Ukraine) Denys Molchanov	6–3, 6–2

=== Women's singles ===
Year	Champion	Runner-up	Score
2011	(Russia) Yulia Putintseva	(Ukraine) Elina Svitolina	6–2, 6–4

=== Women's doubles ===
Year	Champions	Runners-up	Score
2011	(Belarus) Darya Kustova (Ukraine) Olga Savchuk	(Russia) Natela Dzalamidze (Russia) Margarita Gasparyan	6–0, 6–2
