= Andrey Kuznetsov (tennis) =

Inactive Russian tennis player and tennis coach

Andrey Kuznetsov Андрей Кузнецов
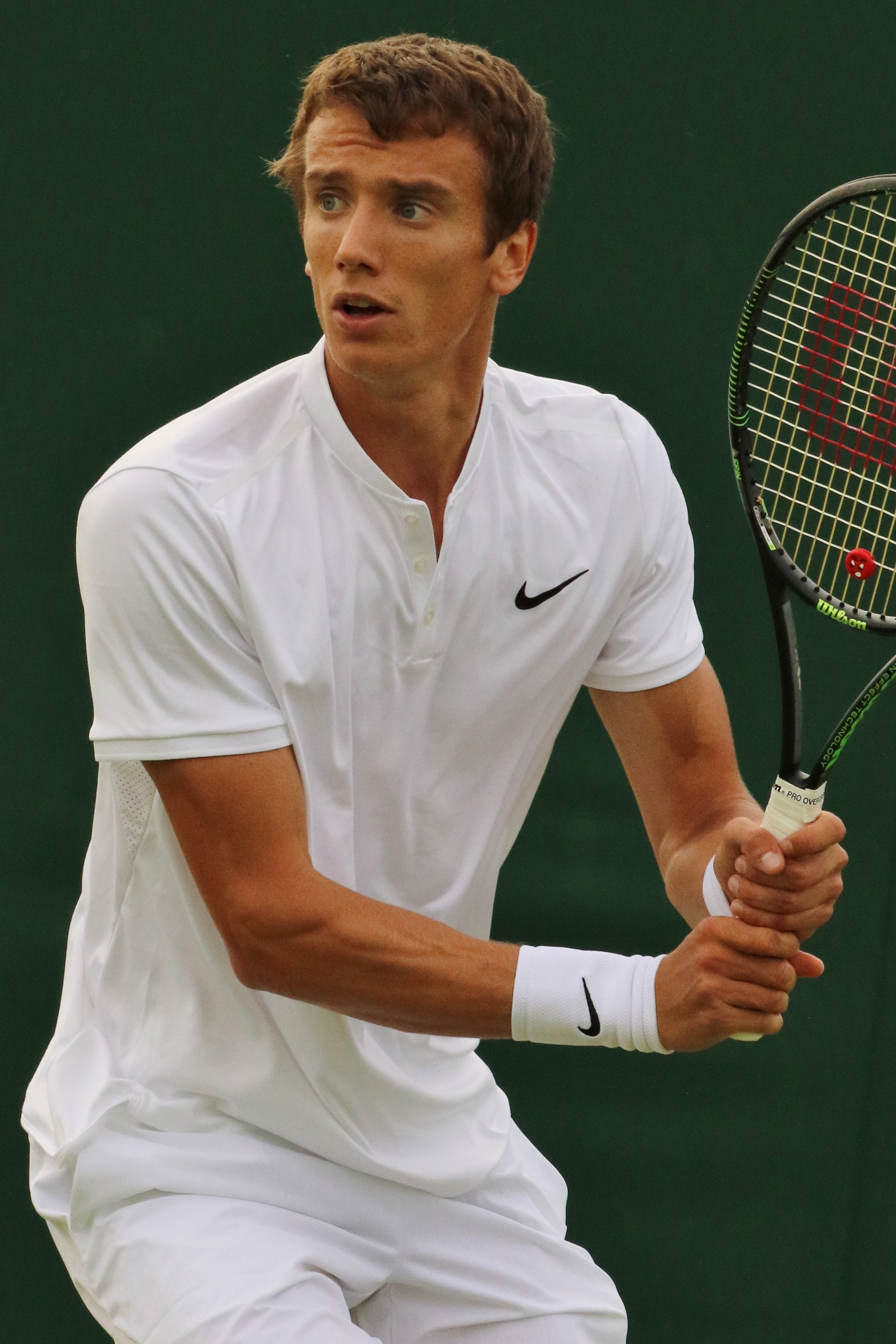
- Kuznetsov playing at the 2016 Wimbledon Championships
- Country (sports): Russia
- Born: 22 February 1991 (age 35) Tula, Russian SFSR, Soviet Union
- Height: 1.83 m (6 ft 0 in)
- Turned pro: 2009
- Retired: July 2024 (last match played)
- Plays: Right-handed (two-handed backhand)
- Prize money: $ 3,055,162

Singles
- Career record: 78–101
- Career titles: 0
- Highest ranking: No. 39 (25 April 2016)

Grand Slam singles results
- Australian Open: 4R (2016)
- French Open: 3R (2015)
- Wimbledon: 3R (2014, 2016)
- US Open: 3R (2014, 2016)

Other tournaments
- Olympic Games: 1R (2016)

Doubles
- Career record: 21–27
- Career titles: 0
- Highest ranking: No. 137 (27 February 2017)

Grand Slam doubles results
- Australian Open: 2R (2017)
- French Open: 1R (2016)
- Wimbledon: 1R (2013)
- US Open: 2R (2017)
- Last updated on: 15 August 2024.

Medal record

Representing Russia

Tennis

Universiade
Gold medal – first place	2013 Kazan	Mixed doubles

Andrey Alexandrovich Kuznetsov (Russian: Андре́й Алекса́ндрович Кузнецо́в, born 22 February 1991) is a Russian coach and a former professional tennis player. On 25 April 2016, he achieved his singles career-high of world No. 39.

Kuznetsov won the Boys' Singles title at the 2009 Wimbledon Championships.

== Career ==
=== Early life ===
Andrey Kuznestov started playing tennis at age six, coached by his father Alexander. In 2001, his family moved to Balashikha, attending the sports club there. His father resumed coaching Andrey and his elder brother Alexey.

According to some mass media reports, Andrey allegedly had problems with his back since his childhood, so he attended manual therapies. But Andrey's coach and father declined it, stating he had problems with his hip and the therapy could be described as tough fitness.

=== 2006–09: Grand Slam Junior title ===
Kuznetsov played his first ITF junior tournament at the 2006 Black Gold of Udmurtia, but received a walkover in the qualifying round. His first notable achievement was at the Governor Cup in St. Petersburg, reaching the semi-finals there. He reached his first final at the NBU Cup in Uzbekistan. Most of the tournaments were on a clay court, but in 2007 he played on carpet and hard. In this season he reached three finals in singles, winning once, and three doubles finals in doubles, winning twice. His best season was in 2008, when he won three singles titles and played well in doubles. Andrey's last junior tournament became the 2009 Wimbledon, winning his first Grand Slam title. For the first time in 43 years a Russian won the Wimbledon since Soviet Vladimir Korotkov achieved that feat in 1965 and 1966.

As a junior Kuznetsov posted an 80–24 win–loss record in singles, reaching a combined ranking of No. 3 in the world in July 2009.

=== 2010–15: Grand Slam debut, Top 100, first Grand Slam and first top-10 win ===
He made his first main draw Grand Slam appearance at the 2010 Wimbledon Championships where he lost in five sets to the 31st seed Romanian Victor Hănescu.

He defeated the 11th seed of the 2013 Australian Open, Juan Mónaco in straight sets in the first round to reach the second round of a Grand Slam for the first time.

At Wimbledon in 2014, Kuznetsov recorded his first win over a player ranked inside the world's top-10 by defeating seventh seed David Ferrer in five sets. The win also took Kuznetsov to the third round of a Grand Slam for the first time.

At the 2014 US Open, he defeated Fernando Verdasco in the second round, but lost to Andy Murray in the third round.

At the 2015 Australian Open, he got into the second round, but lost to the top seed Novak Djokovic.

=== 2016: Russian No. 1, second top-10 win ===
Andrey debuted in 2016 at the Qatar Open, losing in the quarterfinals to Rafael Nadal in three tight sets. At the 2016 Australian Open, he got his best ever result in a grand slam, beating Dudi Sela to make it to the fourth round. In the following tournaments he got beyond the first rounds. Reaching the second round of the Miami Open, Kuznetsov became Russia's new number one male tennis player, replacing Teymuraz Gabashvili, who lost in Miami in the first round. Kuznetsov in the second round defeated 4th-seeded Stan Wawrinka, the second time he won against a top-10 player. He then beat Adrian Mannarino in the third round 2–6, 7–5, 6–0. In the fourth round he lost to Nick Kyrgios 6–7, 3–6.

Kuznetsov debuted at the Olympic Games. In the first round he retired before the start of the third set of the match against Roberto Bautista Agut because of injury.

=== 2017: First 3 ATP singles semifinals and first doubles final ===
After a first round loss to fifth seed Jo-Wilfried Tsonga in Doha, Kuznetsov made his maiden ATP semifinal appearance in Sydney where he fell to fellow first time semifinalist Dan Evans in another three setter. In the first round of the Australian Open, he pushed fifth seed Kei Nishikori to five sets. In the first round of the Davis Cup World Group, he teamed up with Konstantin Kravchuk in Russia's doubles rubber against Serbia but they lost in four sets to Viktor Troicki and Nenad Zimonjić. A week later, he lost to Troicki and Zimonjić again, this time in the doubles final of the Garanti Koza Sofia Open. He ended a three match losing streak at the Miami Open where he reached the second round.

Kuznetsov began his clay season in Monte Carlo where he qualified for the main draw following wins over established players Julien Benneteau and Mikhail Youzhny. He then lost to the ninth seed Tomas Berdych after taking the first set. He reached his second quarterfinal of the year at the inaugural Hungarian Open where he upset the third seed Fabio Fognini en route. After a three set first round loss to Tsonga at the Mutua Madrid Open, Kuznetsov advanced to his second ATP semifinal in singles at the Geneva Open where he fell to world No. 3 and defending champion Stan Wawrinka in straight sets. At the French Open, he took a set off world No. 1 Andy Murray in the first round. In the SkiStar Swedish Open he made it to his third career semifinal, also his third semifinal this year. He first beat German tennis player Jan-Lennard Struff in only 2 sets. He then defeated no.1 seed, Pablo Carreño Busta, after Carreño Busta retired in the third set. He then beat 7th seed Diego Schwartzman in the quarterfinals in straight sets to eventually lose to Alexandr Dolgopolov in the semifinals.

=== 2018–2019: Hiatus and coaching career ===
Kuznetsov's only tournament of 2018 was when he participated in the Koblenz Challenger, taking place in January and lost his first round match against alternate player Ilya Ivashka.

In 2019, he was announced as the coach of Russian tennis player Evgeny Donskoy.

=== 2020-2022: Comeback, Challenger title and French Open qualification ===
Kuznetsov returned on court at the 2020 US Open after nearly three years absence. He received a protected ranking and won his first round match against Sam Querrey in straight sets but lost in the next round to 11th seed Karen Khachanov in straight sets.

Kuznetsov won his first challenger title in close to six years at the 2021 President's Cup II defeating Jason Kubler in the final.

He qualified for the 2022 French Open for his Grand Slam main draw participation in two years and in five years at this Major.

=== 2023-2024: Back to coaching ===
At the 2023 Winston-Salem Open he entered the singles main draw as a lucky loser directly into the second round after the withdrawal of 16th Emil Ruusuvuori.

He was coaching compatriot Roman Safiullin in 2023 and 2024.

== Playing style ==
Kuznetsov is an aggressive baseliner. He likes to hit it very hard and especially cross-court. While his forehand used to be somewhat of a weakness, it has now developed into a competent shot which he can use as a weapon. On the other hand, his main weakness is his second serve.

Patrick Mouratoglou in 2011 noted his flat shots, nice serve and volley play and a great forehand, but also felt his shot placement and movement should be improved.

== Personal life ==
On 30 June 2018, Kuznetsov married Darya Levchenko, a TV show presenter on Match TV.

== ATP career finals ==
=== Doubles: 1 (1 runner-up) ===
Legend Grand Slam tournaments (0–0) ATP World Tour Finals (0–0) ATP World Tour Masters 1000 (0–0) ATP World Tour 500 Series (0–0) ATP World Tour 250 Series (0–1)	Finals by surface Hard (0–1) Clay (0–0) Grass (0–0) Carpet (0–0)

Outcome	No.	Date	Tournament	Surface	Partner	Opponents	Score
Runner-up	1.	12 February 2017	Sofia Open, Sofia, Bulgaria	Hard (i)	(Russia) Mikhail Elgin	(Serbia) Viktor Troicki (Serbia) Nenad Zimonjic	4–6, 4–6

== Junior significant finals ==
=== Junior Grand Slam finals ===
==== Singles: 1 (1 title) ====
Outcome	Year	Championship	Surface	Opponent	Score
Winner	2009	Wimbledon	Grass	(United States) Jordan Cox	4–6, 6–2, 6–2

== Other finals ==
=== Universiade medal matches ===
==== Mixed Doubles: 1 (1 gold medal) ====
Outcome	Year	Championship	Surface	Partner	Opponents	Score
Gold	2013	Kazan Universiade	Hard	(Russia) Elena Vesnina	(Japan) Shota Tagawa (Japan) Hiroko Kuwata	6–4, 3–6, [12–10]

=== Futures and Challenger finals ===
==== Singles: 24 (15 titles, 9 runner-ups) ====
Legend
ATP Challenger Tour (8–4)
ITF Futures/World Tennis Tour (7–5)

Outcome	W–L	Date	Tournament	Tier	Surface	Opponent	Score
Runner-up	0–1	Mar 2009	Egypt F4, 6th of October City	Futures	Clay	(Morocco) Reda El Amrani	6–1, 1–6, 1–6
Winner	1–1	Jun 2009	Italy F14, Mestre	Futures	Clay	(Italy) Matteo Viola	3–6, 6–1, 6–4
Winner	2–1	Aug 2009	Russia F4, Moscow	Futures	Clay	(France) Jonathan Eysseric	6–4, 6–4
Winner	3–1	Oct 2009	Kazakhstan F5, Astana	Futures	Hard (i)	(Russia) Andrey Kumantsov	6–2, 4–6, 6–2
Winner	4–1	Mar 2010	Kazakhstan F2, Almaty	Futures	Hard (i)	(Austria) Alexander Peya	6–3, 7–6^{(7–1)}
Runner-up	4–2	Jul 2010	Germany F7, Kassel	Futures	Clay	(Uzbekistan) Farrukh Dustov	4–6, 4–6
Runner-up	4–3	Jul 2010	Poznań, Poland	Challenger	Clay	(Germany) Denis Gremelmayr	1–6, 2–6
Winner	5–3	Sep 2011	Spain F32, Oviedo	Futures	Clay	(Japan) Taro Daniel	7–5, 6–1
Runner-up	5–4	Oct 2011	Croatia F10, Umag	Futures	Clay	(Serbia) Dušan Lajović	4–6, 6–0, 5–7
Winner	6–4	Jan 2012	Egypt F1, Cairo	Futures	Clay	(France) Laurent Recouderc	6–4, 6–3
Winner	7–4	Feb 2012	Egypt F2, Cairo	Futures	Clay	(Slovakia) Pavol Červenák	6–3, 6–3
Winner	8–4	Apr 2012	Naples, Italy	Challenger	Clay	(France) Jonathan Dasnières de Veigy	7–6^{(8–6)}, 7–6^{(8–6)}
Winner	9–4	Sep 2012	Todi, Italy	Challenger	Clay	(Italy) Paolo Lorenzi	6–3, 2–0 ret.
Winner	10–4	Sep 2012	Trnava, Slovakia	Challenger	Clay	(Romania) Adrian Ungur	6–3, 6–3
Winner	11–4	Sep 2012	Lermontov, Russia	Challenger	Clay	(Uzbekistan) Farrukh Dustov	6–7^{(7–9)}, 6–2, 6–2
Runner-up	11–5	Nov 2013	Tyumen, Russia	Challenger	Hard (i)	(Kazakhstan) Andrey Golubev	4–6, 3–6
Winner	12–5	May 2014	Ostrava, Czech Republic	Challenger	Clay	(Slovakia) Miloslav Mečíř Jr.	2–6, 6–3, 6–0
Runner-up	12–6	Aug 2014	Meerbusch, Germany	Challenger	Clay	(Slovakia) Jozef Kovalík	1–6, 4–6
Runner-up	12–7	Jul 2015	Scheveningen, Netherlands	Challenger	Clay	(Georgia (country)) Nikoloz Basilashvili	7–6^{(7–3)}, 6–7^{(4–7)}, 3–6
Winner	13–7	Aug 2015	Manerbio, Italy	Challenger	Clay	(Spain) Daniel Muñoz de la Nava	6–4, 3–6, 6–1
Winner	14–7	Sep 2015	Como, Italy	Challenger	Clay	(Germany) Daniel Brands	6–4, 6–3
Runner-up	14–8	Feb 2021	M15 St. Petersburg, Russia	World Tennis Tour	Hard (i)	(Russia) Evgenii Tiurnev	6–4, 5–7, 5–7
Winner	15–8	Jul 2021	Nur-Sultan, Kazakhstan	Challenger	Hard	(Australia) Jason Kubler	6–3, 2–1 ret.
Runner-up	15–9	Oct 2021	M25 Nur-Sultan, Kazakhstan	World Tennis Tour	Hard	(Canada) Filip Peliwo	3–6, 5–7

==== Doubles: 19 (9 titles, 10 runner-ups) ====
Legend
ATP Challenger Tour (5–7)
ITF Futures/World Tennis Tour (4–3)

Outcome	W–L	Date	Tournament	Tier	Surface	Partner	Opponents	Score
Winner	1–0	Apr 2009	Egypt F5, Suiz	Futures	Clay	(Hungary) Róbert Varga	(Moldova) Radu Albot (Romania) Teodor-Dacian Crăciun	6–2, 6–4
Winner	2–0	May 2009	Czech Republic F1, Teplice	Futures	Clay	(Poland) Mateusz Kowalczyk	(Czech Republic) Michal Tabara (Czech Republic) Roman Vögeli	4–6, 7–6^{(7–5)}, [10–8]
Runner-up	2–1	Dec 2009	Khanty-Mansiysk, Russia	Challenger	Hard	(Russia) Evgeny Kirillov	(Spain) Marcel Granollers (Spain) Gerard Granollers Pujol	3–6, 2–6
Winner	3–1	Apr 2010	Italy F4, Vercelli	Futures	Clay	(Russia) Ilya Belyaev	(Argentina) Juan-Martín Aranguren (Argentina) Alejandro Fabbri	6–4, 7–6^{(7–2)}
Runner-up	3–2	Jul 2010	Germany F7, Kassel	Futures	Clay	(Russia) Denis Matsukevitch	(Slovakia) Ivo Klec (Germany) Alexander Satschko	1–6, 7–6^{(7–3)}, [10–12]
Runner-up	3–3	Jul 2011	Dortmund, Germany	Challenger	Clay	(Russia) Teymuraz Gabashvili	(Germany) Dominik Meffert (Germany) Bjorn Phau	4–6, 3–6
Runner-up	3–4	Aug 2011	Samarkand, Uzbekistan	Challenger	Clay	(Moldova) Radu Albot	(Russia) Mikhail Elgin (Russia) Alexander Kudryavtsev	6–7^{(4–7)}, 6–2, [7–10]
Runner-up	3–5	Aug 2011	Russia F6, Moscow	Futures	Clay	(Latvia) Deniss Pavlovs	(Russia) Mikhail Fufygin (Russia) Sergei Krotiouk	4–6, 7–6^{(16–14)}, [8–10]
Runner-up	3–6	Jan 2012	Russia F1, Moscow	Futures	Hard (i)	(Russia) Stanislav Vovk	(Latvia) Andis Juška (Latvia) Deniss Pavlovs	6–7^{(1–7)}, 3–6
Runner-up	3–7	Mar 2012	Casablanca, Morocco	Challenger	Clay	(Russia) Evgeny Donskoy	(Italy) Walter Trusendi (Italy) Matteo Viola	6–1, 6–7^{(5–7)}, [3–10]
Runner-up	3–8	Jun 2012	Nottingham, Great Britain	Challenger	Grass	(Russia) Evgeny Donskoy	(France) Olivier Charroin (Austria) Martin Fischer	4–6, 6–7^{(6–8)}
Runner-up	3–9	Jul 2012	Oberstaufen, Germany	Challenger	Clay	(New Zealand) Jose Statham	(Romania) Andrei Dăescu (Romania) Florin Mergea	6–7^{(4–7)}, 6–7^{(1–7)}
Winner	4–9	Nov 2012	Marbella, Spain	Challenger	Clay	(Spain) Javier Martí	(Spain) Emilio Benfele Álvarez (Italy) Adelchi Virgili	6–3, 6–3
Winner	5–9	May 2014	Ostrava, Czech Republic	Challenger	Clay	(Spain) Adrián Menéndez-Maceiras	(Italy) Alessandro Motti (Italy) Matteo Viola	4–6, 6–3, [10–8]
Winner	6–9	Aug 2014	Prague, Czech Republic	Challenger	Clay	(Croatia) Toni Androić	(Venezuela) Roberto Maytín (Mexico) Miguel Ángel Reyes-Varela	7–5, 7–5
Winner	7–9	Jan 2015	Happy Valley, Australia	Challenger	Hard	(Kazakhstan) Aleksandr Nedovyesov	(Australia) Alex Bolt (Australia) Andrew Whittington	7–5, 6–4
Runner-up	7–10	Jul 2015	Scheveningen, Netherlands	Challenger	Clay	(Russia) Aslan Karatsev	(Uruguay) Ariel Behar (Brazil) Eduardo Dischinger	0–0, ret.
Winner	8–10	Sep 2015	Istanbul, Turkey	Challenger	Hard	(Kazakhstan) Aleksandr Nedovyesov	(Georgia (country)) Aleksandre Metreveli (Russia) Anton Zaitsev	6–2, 5–7, [10–8]
Winner	9–10	Oct 2021	M25 Nur-Sultan, Kazakhstan	World Tennis Tour	Hard	(Kazakhstan) Beibit Zhukayev	(Russia) Konstantin Kravchuk (Belarus) Ivan Liutarevich	7–6^{(7–5)}, 6–4

== Singles performance timeline ==
Key
W	F	SF	QF	#R	RR	Q#	P#	DNQ	A	Z#	PO	G	S	B	NMS	NTI	P	NH

(W) winner; (F) finalist; (SF) semifinalist; (QF) quarterfinalist; (#R) rounds 4, 3, 2, 1; (RR) round-robin stage; (Q#) qualification round; (P#) preliminary round; (DNQ) did not qualify; (A) absent; (Z#) Davis/Fed Cup Zonal Group (with number indication) or (PO) play-off; (G) gold, (S) silver or (B) bronze Olympic/Paralympic medal; (NMS) not a Masters tournament; (NTI) not a Tier I tournament; (P) postponed; (NH) not held; (SR) strike rate (events won / competed); (W–L) win–loss record.
To avoid confusion and double counting, these charts are updated at the conclusion of a tournament or when the player's participation has ended.

Current through the 2022 Australian Open.

Tournament	2009	2010	2011	2012	2013	2014	2015	2016	2017	2018	2019	2020	2021	2022	SR	W–L
Grand Slam tournaments
Australian Open	A	A	Q1	A	2R	A	2R	4R	1R	A	A	A	Q1	Q1	0 / 4	5–4
French Open	A	A	Q3	1R	1R	Q3	3R	2R	1R	A	A	A	Q2	1R	0 / 6	3–6
Wimbledon	A	1R	Q2	1R	2R	3R	Q2	3R	1R	A	A	NH	Q2	A	0 / 6	5–6
US Open	A	A	A	A	1R	3R	A	3R	1R	A	A	2R	A	A	0 / 5	5–5
Win–loss	0–0	0–1	0–0	0–2	2–4	4–2	3–2	8–4	0–4	0–0	0–0	1–1	0–0	0–1	0 / 21	18–21
ATP World Tour Masters 1000
Indian Wells Masters	A	A	A	A	1R	Q1	A	3R	1R	A	A	NH	A	A	0 / 3	2–3
Miami Open	A	A	A	A	1R	A	A	4R	2R	A	A	NH	A	A	0 / 3	4–3
Monte-Carlo Masters	A	A	A	A	A	A	1R	1R	1R	A	A	NH	A	A	0 / 3	0–3
Madrid Open	A	A	A	A	A	A	A	2R	1R	A	A	NH	A	A	0 / 2	1–2
Italian Open	A	A	A	A	2R	A	Q1	A	A	A	A	A	A	A	0 / 1	1–1
Canadian Open	A	A	A	A	A	A	A	1R	A	A	A	NH	A	A	0 / 1	0–1
Cincinnati Masters	A	A	A	A	A	A	A	A	A	A	A	A	A	A	0 / 0	0–0
Shanghai Masters	A	A	A	A	A	A	1R	A	A	A	A	NH			0 / 1	0–1
Paris Masters	A	A	A	Q1	A	A	A	A	A	A	A	A	A	A	0 / 0	0–0
Win–loss	0–0	0–0	0–0	0–0	1–3	0–0	0–2	6–5	1–4	0–0	0–0	0–0	0–0	0–0	0 / 14	8–14
National representation
Summer Olympics	NH			A	NH			1R	NH				A	NH	0 / 1	0–1
Davis Cup	A	A	A	A	Z1	Z1	PO	PO	1R	A	A	A	A		0 / 5	7–0
Career statistics
	2009	2010	2011	2012	2013	2014	2015	2016	2017	2018	2019	2020	2021	2022	SR	W–L
Tournaments	2	4	4	5	19	8	12	21	22	0	0	1	1	1	100	
Titles	0	0	0	0	0	0	0	0	0	0	0	0	0	0	0	
Finals reached	0	0	0	0	0	0	0	0	0	0	0	0	0	0	0	
Hard win–loss	1–2	0–2	0–1	0–2	2–6	5–3	6–5	21–14	5–12	0–0	0–0	1–1	0–0	0–1	0 / 49	41–49
Grass win–loss	0–0	1–2	0–0	0–1	2–3	2–3	0–0	2–2	0–2	0–0	0–0	0–0	0–0	0–0	0 / 13	7–13
Clay win–loss	0–0	0–0	2–3	2–2	5–10	2–2	4–7	6–5	9–8	0–0	0–0	0–0	0–1	0–0	0 / 38	30–38
Overall win–loss	1–2	1–4	2–4	2–5	9–19	9–8	10–12	29–21	14–22	0–0	0–0	1–1	0–1	0–1	0 / 100	78–100
Win %	33%	20%	33%	29%	32%	53%	45%	58%	39%	–	–	50%	0%		44%	
Year-end ranking	301	231	222	78	134	92	79	46	107	–	–	517	264		$3,042,950	

== Davis Cup ==
=== Participations: (8–1) ===
Group membership World Group (0–1) WG Play-off (2–0) Group I (6–0) Group II (0–0) Group III (0–0) Group IV (0–0)	Matches by surface Hard (8–1) Clay (0–0) Grass (0–0) Carpet (0–0)	Matches by type Singles (7–0) Doubles (1–1)

- ▲ ▼ indicates the outcome of the Davis Cup match followed by the score, date, place of event, the zonal classification and its phase, and the court surface.

Rubber outcome	No.	Rubber	Match type (partner if any)	Opponent nation	Opponent player(s)	Score
▲5–0; 25–27 October 2013; Olympic Stadium, Moscow, Russia; Europe/Africa Second round play-off; Hard(i) surface
Victory	1	III	Doubles (with Konstantin Kravchuk)	South Africa	Raven Klaasen / Tucker Vorster	2–6, 6–3, 7–6^{(7–4)}, 6–2
Victory	2	IV	Singles (Dead rubber)	South Africa	Dennis O'Brien	6–2, 6–3
▲4–1; 12–14 September 2014; Olympic Stadium, Moscow, Russia; Europe/Africa Second round play-off; Hard(i) surface
Victory	3	I	Singles	Portugal	Gastão Elias	6–2, 6–4, 6–4
▲4–1; 6–8 March 2015; Sport Complex Gazprom Dobycha Yamburg, Novy Urengoy, Russia; Europe/Africa First round; Hard(i) surface
Victory	4	II	Singles	Denmark	Martin Pedersen	6–1, 6–4, 7–5
Victory	5	IV	Singles	Denmark	Frederik Nielsen	7–5, 6–3, 6–2
▲5–0; 4–6 March 2016; Kazan Tennis Academy, Kazan, Russia; Europe/Africa First round; Hard(i) surface
Victory	6	I	Singles	Sweden	Isak Arvidsson	4–6, 6–1, 6–1, 6–4
▲3–1; 17–18 September 2016; National Tennis Center, Moscow, Russia; World Group play-offs; Hard surface
Victory	7	I	Singles	Kazakhstan	Aleksandr Nedovyesov	6–3, 6–4, 5–7, 7–5
Victory	8	IV	Singles	Kazakhstan	Mikhail Kukushkin	6–1, 6–2, 6–2
▼1–4; 3–5 February 2017; Čair Sports Center, Niš, Serbia; World Group; Hard(i) surface
Defeat	9	III	Doubles (with Konstantin Kravchuk)	Serbia	Viktor Troicki / Nenad Zimonjić	3–6, 6–7^{(3–7)}, 7–6^{(7–5)}, 4–6

== Wins over top 10 players ==
#	Player	Rank	Event	Surface	Rd	Score	AK Rank
2014
1.	(Spain) David Ferrer	7	Wimbledon, London, Great Britain	Grass	2R	6–7^{(5–7)}, 6–0, 3–6, 6–3, 6–2	118
2016
2.	(Switzerland) Stan Wawrinka	4	Miami, United States	Hard	3R	6–4, 6–3	51
