= Javier Martí =

Spanish tennis player

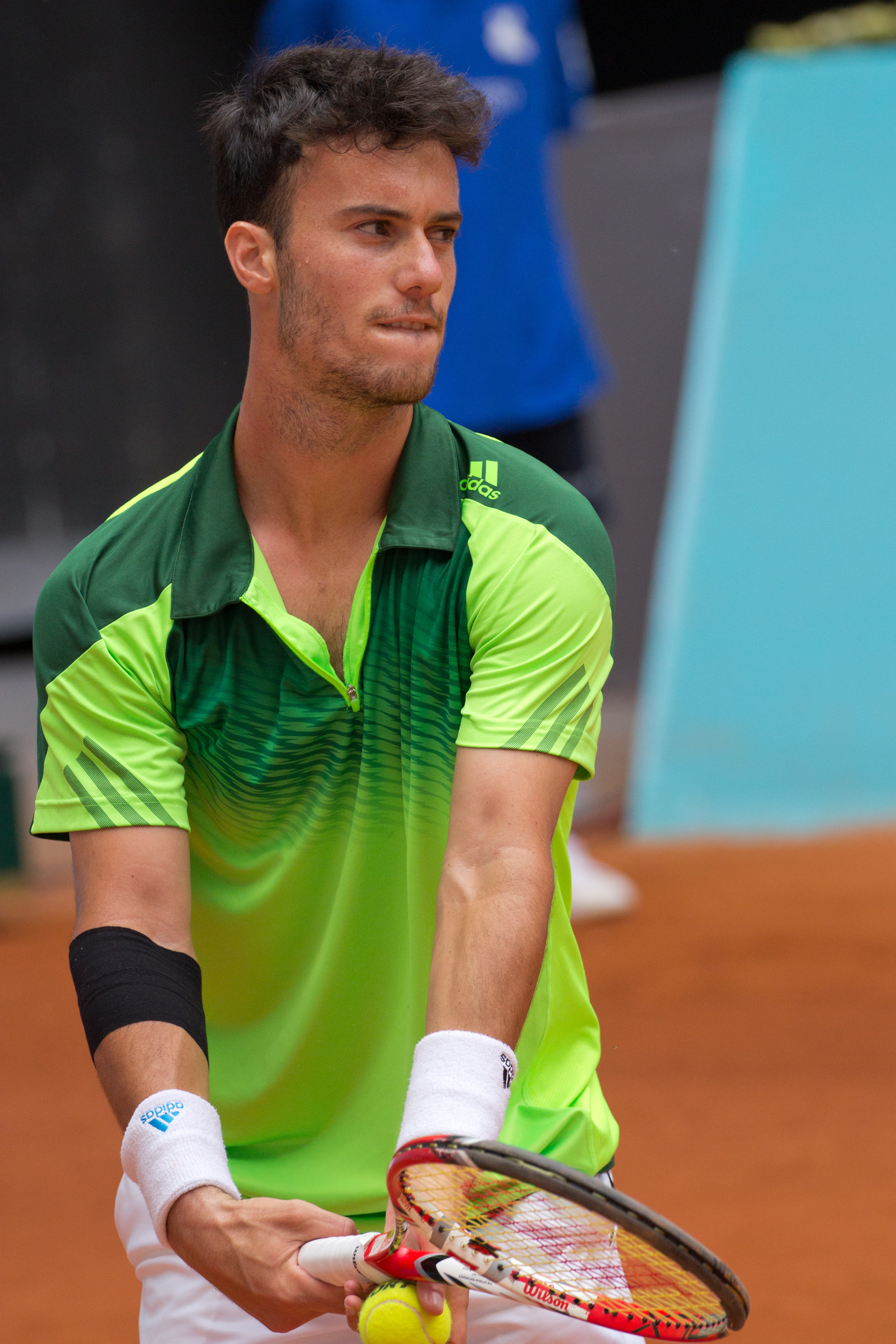
- Martí at the 2015 Mutua Madrid Open
- Country (sports): Spain
- Born: 11 January 1992 (age 33); Madrid, Spain
- Turned pro: 2009
- Retired: 2023 (last match played)
- Plays: Right-handed (one-handed backhand)
- Coach: Oscar Burrieza
- Prize money: $378,362

Singles
- Career record: 2–11 (at ATP Tour and Grand Slam-level, and in Davis Cup)
- Career titles: 0
- Highest ranking: No. 170 (23 April 2012)

Grand Slam singles results
- Australian Open: Q3 (2013)
- French Open: 1R (2011)
- Wimbledon: Q3 (2013)

Doubles
- Career record: 1–3 (at ATP Tour and Grand Slam-level, and in Davis Cup)
- Career titles: 0
- Highest ranking: No. 201 (16 April 2012)
- Last updated on: 7 April 2024.

Javier Martí Hernanz (Spanish pronunciation: [xaˈβjeɾ maɾˈti eɾˈnanθ]; born 11 January 1992) is a coach and a former professional tennis player from Spain. His career high singles rank was world No. 170, achieved on 23 April 2012.

Javier qualified for the 2011 French Open by defeating Andrej Martin, Jaroslav Pospíšil, and Ryan Harrison. He has captured one ATP Challenger Tour doubles title at the 2012 Marbella Open.

== Coaching ==
He was the coach of Spanish tennis player Paula Badosa. He coached Jessica Bouzas Maneiro from December 2022 to September 2023. He currently coaches Romanian player Jaqueline Cristian.
