= 2015 Challenger ATP Cachantún Cup – Singles =

Singles
- 2015 Challenger ATP Cachantún Cup

Final
- Champion: (Argentina) Facundo Bagnis
- Runner-up: (Brazil) Guilherme Clezar
- Score: 6–2, 5–7, 6–2

Events
Singles	Doubles
← 2014 ·	Challenger ATP Cachantún Cup	· 2016 →

Thiemo de Bakker was the defending champion, but did not participate.

== Seeds ==
1. (Brazil) ~~João Souza~~ (withdrew)
2. (Colombia) Alejandro González (semifinals)
3. (Argentina) Máximo González (quarterfinals)
4. (Argentina) Facundo Bagnis (champion)
5. (Argentina) Horacio Zeballos (second round)
6. (Argentina) Facundo Argüello (second round)
7. (Chile) Hans Podlipnik-Castillo (first round)
8. (Argentina) Renzo Olivo (second round)

== Draw ==
=== Key ===
- Q = Qualifier
- WC = Wild card
- LL = Lucky loser
- Alt = Alternate
- ITF = ITF entry
- PR = Protected ranking
- SR = Special ranking
- SE = Special exempt
- JE = Junior exempt
- JR = Junior Accelerator Programme entrant
- CO = College Accelerator Programme entrant
- NG = Next Gen Accelerator Program entrant
- w/o = Walkover
- r = Retired
- d = Defaulted

=== Finals ===
Semifinals
(Spain) Jordi Samper-Montaña	6	2	4
4	(Argentina) Facundo Bagnis	4	6	6
(Brazil) Guilherme Clezar	6	6
2	(Colombia) Alejandro González	1	1

Final
4	(Argentina) Facundo Bagnis	6	5	6
(Brazil) Guilherme Clezar	2	7	2

=== Top half ===
First round
LL	(Argentina) Patricio Heras	3	6	4
(Spain) J Samper-Montaña	6	3	6
(Chile) N Jarry	4	6	6
(Brazil) R Dutra Silva	6	3	1
(Argentina) P Cachin	3	4
(Spain) R Ramírez Hidalgo	6	6
LL	(Brazil) R Hocevar	4	6	4
8	(Argentina) R Olivo	6	0	6
4	(Argentina) F Bagnis	6	5	6
(Chile) G Lama	3	7	2
(Chile) C Garin	4	4
WC	(Chile) JC Sáez	6	6
Q	(Brazil) C Zampieri	7	6^{6}	7^{7}
Q	(Argentina) A Collarini	5	7^{8}	6^{4}
WC	(Chile) J Aguilar	6^{5}	4
5	(Argentina) H Zeballos	7^{7}	6

Second round
(Spain) J Samper-Montaña	6	6
(Chile) N Jarry	1	4
(Spain) R Ramírez Hidalgo	6	6
8	(Argentina) R Olivo	2	3
4	(Argentina) F Bagnis	6	6
WC	(Chile) JC Sáez	3	4
Q	(Brazil) C Zampieri	6	5	6
5	(Argentina) H Zeballos	4	7	4

Quarterfinals
(Spain) J Samper-Montaña	6	6
(Spain) R Ramírez Hidalgo	3	4
4	(Argentina) F Bagnis	2	6	6
Q	(Brazil) C Zampieri	6	3	2

Semifinals
(Spain) J Samper-Montaña	6	2	4
4	(Argentina) F Bagnis	4	6	6

=== Bottom half ===
First round
6	(Argentina) F Argüello	6	6
(Argentina) G Pella	2	3
(Brazil) G Clezar	6	6
(Dominican Republic) J Hernández	4	2
(Ecuador) G Lapentti	6	6
(Argentina) A Molteni	3	2
Q	(Brazil) T Monteiro	3	6	4
3	(Argentina) M González	6	4	6
7	(Chile) H Podlipnik-Castillo	3	2
(France) S Robert	6	6
(Argentina) JI Londero	6	6
Q	(Italy) G Quinzi	4	4
WC	(Chile) Bastián Malla	7^{8}	6^{8}	6
WC	(Chile) G Rivera-Aránguiz	6^{6}	7^{10}	2
(Brazil) F de Paula	4	4
2	(Colombia) A González	6	6

Second round
6	(Argentina) F Argüello	3	3
(Brazil) G Clezar	6	6
(Ecuador) G Lapentti	3	7	4
3	(Argentina) M González	6	5	6
(France) S Robert	1	2
(Argentina) JI Londero	6	6
WC	(Chile) B Malla	4	2
2	(Colombia) A González	6	6

Quarterfinals
(Brazil) G Clezar	6	6
3	(Argentina) M González	4	2
(Argentina) JI Londero	6	6^{3}	2
2	(Colombia) A González	1	7^{7}	6

Semifinals
(Brazil) G Clezar	6	6
2	(Colombia) A González	1	1
