= 2009 Challenger de Providencia – Doubles =

Doubles
- 2009 Challenger de Providencia

Final
- Champions: (Argentina) Horacio Zeballos (Argentina) Sebastián Prieto
- Runners-up: (Brazil) Flávio Saretta (Brazil) Rogério Dutra da Silva
- Score: 7–6(2), 6–2

Events
Singles	Doubles
← 2008 ·	Challenger de Providencia	· 2010 →

Eduardo Schwank and Mariano Hood were the defending champions of the Challenger de Providencia, but they chose to not participate in the 2009 tournament.
Horacio Zeballos and Sebastián Prieto won in the final 7–6(2), 6–2, against Flávio Saretta and Rogério Dutra da Silva.

== Seeds ==
1. (Argentina) Horacio Zeballos / (Argentina) Sebastián Prieto (champions)
2. (Argentina) Juan-Martín Aranguren / (Argentina) Alejandro Fabbri (quarterfinals)
3. (Brazil) Franco Ferreiro / (Brazil) André Miele (first round)
4. (Brazil) Ricardo Hocevar / (Brazil) João Souza (quarterfinals)

== Draw ==
=== Key ===
- Q = Qualifier
- WC = Wild card
- LL = Lucky loser
- Alt = Alternate
- SE = Special exempt
- PR = Protected ranking
- ITF = ITF entry
- JE = Junior exempt
- w/o = Walkover
- r = Retired
- d = Defaulted
- SR = Special ranking

=== Draw ===
First round
(Chile) G Hormazábal (Chile) H Podlipnik-Castillo	6^{5}	5
(Italy) R Ghedin (Serbia) D Savić	7	7
3	(Brazil) F Ferreiro (Brazil) A Miele	4	4
(Chile) J Aguilar (Chile) F Parada	6	6
WC	(Argentina) Federico Cavallero (Argentina) Nicolas Jara-Lozano	0	6	[7]
(Argentina) J-P Guzmán (Argentina) L Mayer	6	4	[10]
(Argentina) D Álvarez (Argentina) JP Brzezicki	0	6	[7]
(Brazil) R Dutra da Silva (Brazil) F Saretta	6	2	[10]
(Italy) Luigi D'Agord (Slovenia) L Gregorc	1	2
4	(Brazil) R Hocevar (Brazil) J Souza	6	6
WC	(Argentina) A Kon (Chile) Jorge Montero	5	3
(Argentina) S Decoud (Argentina) Gonzalo Tur	7	6
WC	(Chile) Rodrigo Perez (Chile) G Rivera-Aránguiz	5	2
2	(Argentina) J-M Aranguren (Argentina) A Fabbri	7	6

Quarterfinals
1	(Argentina) S Prieto (Argentina) H Zeballos	6	6
(Italy) R Ghedin (Serbia) D Savić	3	4
(Chile) J Aguilar (Chile) F Parada	6	6
(Argentina) J-P Guzmán (Argentina) L Mayer	2	2
(Brazil) R Dutra da Silva (Brazil) F Saretta	7	6
4	(Brazil) R Hocevar (Brazil) J Souza	6^{12}	4
(Argentina) S Decoud (Argentina) G Tur	6	6
2	(Argentina) J-M Aranguren (Argentina) A Fabbri	1	1

Semifinals
1	(Argentina) S Prieto (Argentina) H Zeballos	3	6	[10]
(Chile) J Aguilar (Chile) F Parada	6	2	[7]
(Brazil) R Dutra da Silva (Brazil) F Saretta
(Argentina) S Decoud (Argentina) G Tur	w/o

Finals
1	(Argentina) S Prieto (Argentina) H Zeballos	7	6
(Brazil) R Dutra da Silva (Brazil) F Saretta	6^{2}	2
