= 2018 Challenger ATP Cachantún Cup – Doubles =

Doubles
- 2018 Challenger ATP Cachantún Cup

Final
- Champions: (Monaco) Romain Arneodo; (France) Jonathan Eysseric
- Runners-up: (Argentina) Guido Andreozzi; (Argentina) Guillermo Durán
- Score: 7–6^{(7–4)}, 1–6, [12–10]

Events
Singles	Doubles
← 2017 ·	Challenger ATP Cachantún Cup	· 2019 →

Marcelo Tomás Barrios Vera and Nicolás Jarry were the defending champions but only Barrios Vera chose to defend his title, partnering José Hernández-Fernández. Barrios Vera lost in the semifinals to Romain Arneodo and Jonathan Eysseric.

Arneodo and Eysseric won the title after defeating Guido Andreozzi and Guillermo Durán 7–6^{(7–4)}, 1–6, [12–10] in the final.

== Seeds ==
1. (Argentina) Máximo González / (Argentina) Andrés Molteni (semifinals)
2. (Monaco) Romain Arneodo / (France) Jonathan Eysseric (champions)
3. (Argentina) Guido Andreozzi / (Argentina) Guillermo Durán (final)
4. (Argentina) Franco Agamenone / (Peru) Sergio Galdós (quarterfinals)

== Draw ==
=== Key ===
- Q = Qualifier
- WC = Wild card
- LL = Lucky loser
- Alt = Alternate
- SE = Special exempt
- PR = Protected ranking
- ITF = ITF entry
- JE = Junior exempt
- w/o = Walkover
- r = Retired
- d = Defaulted
- SR = Special ranking

First round

Quarterfinals

Semifinals

Final

1
- (Argentina) M González
- (Argentina) A Molteni
6
6

WC
- (Chile) Víctor Núñez
- (Argentina) S Rodríguez Taverna
1
1

1
- (Argentina) M González
- (Argentina) A Molteni
6
6

- (Brazil) G Clezar
- (Portugal) J Domingues
5
1

- (Argentina) F Bagnis
- (Uruguay) A Behar
2
4

- (Argentina) F Bagnis
- (Uruguay) A Behar
7
6

1
- (Argentina) M González
- (Argentina) A Molteni
6
4
[6]

3
- (Argentina) G Andreozzi
- (Argentina) G Durán
6
7

3
- (Argentina) G Andreozzi
- (Argentina) G Durán
1
6
[10]

Alt
- (Bolivia) H Dellien
- (Argentina) JP Paz
3
5

3
- (Argentina) G Andreozzi
- (Argentina) G Durán
6
6

- (Argentina) P Cachin
- (Ecuador) R Quiroz
7^{7}
3
[15]

- (Brazil) F de Paula
- (Brazil) J Souza
3
2

- (Brazil) F de Paula
- (Brazil) J Souza
6^{5}
6
[17]

3
- (Argentina) G Andreozzi
- (Argentina) G Durán
6^{4}
6
[10]

- (Italy) A Giannessi
- (Argentina) R Olivo

2
- (Monaco) R Arneodo
- (France) J Eysseric
7^{7}
1
[12]

WC
- (Chile) MT Barrios Vera
- (Dominican Republic) J Hernández-Fernández
w/o

WC
- (Chile) MT Barrios Vera
- (Dominican Republic) J Hernández-Fernández
6
6

- (Argentina) T Lipovšek Puches
- (Argentina) JI Londero
3
0

4
- (Argentina) F Agamenone
- (Peru) S Galdós
3
3

4
- (Argentina) F Agamenone
- (Peru) S Galdós
6
6

WC
- (Chile) MT Barrios Vera
- (Dominican Republic) J Hernández-Fernández
3
3

WC
- (Chile) JC Sáez
- (Chile) A Tabilo
w/o

2
- (Monaco) R Arneodo
- (France) J Eysseric
6
6

- (Slovakia) J Kovalík
- (Austria) S Ofner

WC
- (Chile) JC Sáez
- (Chile) A Tabilo
6
2
[7]

- (Belgium) A De Greef
- (Spain) E López Pérez
6
2
[8]

2
- (Monaco) R Arneodo
- (France) J Eysseric
3
6
[10]

2
- (Monaco) R Arneodo
- (France) J Eysseric
2
6
[10]
