= 2017 Challenger ATP Cachantún Cup – Singles =

Singles
- 2017 Challenger ATP Cachantún Cup

Final
- Champion: (Brazil) Rogério Dutra Silva
- Runner-up: (Chile) Nicolás Jarry
- Score: 7–5, 6–3

Events
Singles	Doubles
← 2016 ·	Challenger ATP Cachantún Cup	· 2018 →

Facundo Bagnis was the defending champion but chose not to defend his title.

Rogério Dutra Silva won the title after defeating Nicolás Jarry 7–5, 6–3 in the final.

== Seeds ==
1. (Brazil) Rogério Dutra Silva (champion)
2. (Argentina) Nicolás Kicker (second round)
3. (Austria) Gerald Melzer (first round)
4. (Japan) Taro Daniel (quarterfinals)
5. (Belgium) Arthur De Greef (second round)
6. (Spain) Íñigo Cervantes (first round)
7. (Italy) Alessandro Giannessi (first round, retired)
8. (Brazil) João Souza (quarterfinals)

== Draw ==
=== Key ===
- Q = Qualifier
- WC = Wild card
- LL = Lucky loser
- Alt = Alternate
- SE = Special exempt
- PR = Protected ranking
- ITF = ITF entry
- JE = Junior exempt
- w/o = Walkover
- r = Retired
- d = Defaulted
- SR = Special ranking

=== Finals ===
Semifinals
1	(Brazil) Rogério Dutra Silva	6	6
PR	(Italy) Simone Bolelli	4	2
WC	(Chile) Nicolás Jarry	w/o
Q	(Brazil) Guilherme Clezar

Final
1	(Brazil) Rogério Dutra Silva	7	6
WC	(Chile) Nicolás Jarry	5	3

=== Top half ===
First round
1	(Brazil) R Dutra Silva	7	6
(Spain) J Samper-Montaña	5	0
Q	(Bolivia) H Dellien	3	6	3
(Brazil) C Zampieri	6	4	6
(Italy) M Cecchinato	7^{7}	6
(Dominican Republic) J Hernández-Fernández	6^{5}	4
Q	(Sweden) C Lindell	6	3	6
6	(Spain) Í Cervantes	3	6	0
4	(Japan) T Daniel	6	3	6
(Argentina) F Coria	4	6	1
(France) M Bourgue	4	3
(Chile) C Garin	6	6
(Chile) G Lama	3	1
(Argentina) L Mayer	6	6
PR	(Italy) S Bolelli	6	3
7	(Italy) A Giannessi	4	2^{r}

Second round
1	(Brazil) R Dutra Silva	6	6
(Brazil) C Zampieri	3	3
(Italy) M Cecchinato	6^{6}	6	6^{5}
Q	(Sweden) C Lindell	7^{8}	4	7^{7}
4	(Japan) T Daniel	6	6
(Chile) C Garin	4	0
(Argentina) L Mayer	6^{5}	6	3
PR	(Italy) S Bolelli	7^{7}	4	6

Quarterfinals
1	(Brazil) R Dutra Silva	6	4	6
Q	(Sweden) C Lindell	1	6	2
4	(Japan) T Daniel	4	4
PR	(Italy) S Bolelli	6	6

Semifinals
1	(Brazil) R Dutra Silva	6	6
PR	(Italy) S Bolelli	4	2

=== Bottom half ===
First round
8	(Brazil) J Souza	6	6
WC	(Chile) MT Barrios Vera	3	4
(Norway) C Ruud	6	6
WC	(Chile) M Soto	2	1
WC	(Chile) N Jarry	6	6
Q	(Peru) JP Varillas	1	4
(Argentina) M González	6	6
3	(Austria) G Melzer	4	1
5	(Belgium) A De Greef	7^{8}	6
(Spain) R Ramírez Hidalgo	6^{6}	2
(Argentina) G Andreozzi	6	6
WC	(Chile) H Podlipnik-Castillo	2	2
Q	(Brazil) G Clezar	3	6	6
(France) T Lamasine	6	4	4
(France) M Janvier	6^{4}	4
2	(Argentina) N Kicker	7^{7}	6

Second round
8	(Brazil) J Souza	5	6	7
(Norway) C Ruud	7	4	5
WC	(Chile) N Jarry	6	6
(Argentina) M González	4	4
5	(Belgium) A De Greef	7^{7}	4	1
(Argentina) G Andreozzi	6^{5}	6	6
Q	(Brazil) G Clezar	4	6	7
2	(Argentina) N Kicker	6	4	5

Quarterfinals
8	(Brazil) J Souza	6^{5}	6^{6}
WC	(Chile) N Jarry	7^{7}	7^{8}
(Argentina) G Andreozzi	4	6	3
Q	(Brazil) G Clezar	6	2	6

Semifinals
WC	(Chile) N Jarry	w/o
Q	(Brazil) G Clezar
