= 2016 Challenger ATP Cachantún Cup – Doubles =

Doubles
- 2016 Challenger ATP Cachantún Cup

Final
- Champions: (Chile) Julio Peralta; (Chile) Hans Podlipnik
- Runners-up: (Argentina) Facundo Bagnis; (Argentina) Máximo González
- Score: 7–6^{(7–4)}, 4–6, [10–5]

Events
Singles	Doubles
← 2015 ·	Challenger ATP Cachantún Cup	· 2017 →

Andrés Molteni and Guido Pella were the defending champions, but chose not to defend their title.

Julio Peralta and Hans Podlipnik won the title defeating Facundo Bagnis and Máximo González in the final, 7–6^{(7–4)}, 4–6, [10–5].

== Seeds ==
1. (Chile) Julio Peralta / (Chile) Hans Podlipnik (champions)
2. (Argentina) Facundo Bagnis / (Argentina) Máximo González (final)
3. (Brazil) Guilherme Clezar / (Brazil) Rogério Dutra Silva (semifinals)
4. (Italy) Alessandro Giannessi / (Italy) Gianluca Naso (quarterfinals)

== Draw ==
=== Key ===
- Q = Qualifier
- WC = Wild card
- LL = Lucky loser
- Alt = Alternate
- SE = Special exempt
- PR = Protected ranking
- ITF = ITF entry
- JE = Junior exempt
- w/o = Walkover
- r = Retired
- d = Defaulted
- SR = Special ranking

First round

Quarterfinals

Semifinals

Final

1
- (Chile) J Peralta
- (Chile) H Podlipnik
6
6^{3}
[10]

- (Spain) O Roca Batalla
- (Spain) J Samper Montaña
1
7^{7}
[5]

1
- (Chile) J Peralta
- (Chile) H Podlipnik
w/o

- (Argentina) Maximiliano Estévez
- (Dominican Republic) J Hernández
7
6

- (Argentina) M Estévez
- (Dominican Republic) J Hernández

- (Austria) M Linzer
- (United Kingdom) D Walsh
5
4

1
- (Chile) J Peralta
- (Chile) H Podlipnik
6
6

3
- (Brazil) G Clezar
- (Brazil) R Dutra Silva
6
7

3
- (Brazil) G Clezar
- (Brazil) R Dutra Silva
3
3

WC
- (France) Adrien Puget
- (Brazil) P Sakamoto
4
5

3
- (Brazil) G Clezar
- (Brazil) R Dutra Silva
6
6

- (Argentina) F Argüello
- (Argentina) T Lipovšek Puches
6
4
[10]

- (Argentina) F Argüello
- (Argentina) T Lipovšek Puches
2
2

- (France) M Bourgue
- (France) M Chazal
4
6
[6]

1
- (Chile) J Peralta
- (Chile) H Podlipnik
7^{7}
4
[10]

- (Sweden) C Lindell
- (Brazil) J Pereira
6^{1}
1

2
- (Argentina) F Bagnis
- (Argentina) M González
6^{4}
6
[5]

- (Brazil) T Monteiro
- (Spain) R Ramírez Hidalgo
7^{7}
6

- (Brazil) T Monteiro
- (Spain) R Ramírez Hidalgo
7^{7}
6^{3}
[10]

- (Argentina) N Kicker
- (Chile) G Lama

4
- (Italy) A Giannessi
- (Italy) G Naso
6^{5}
7^{7}
[6]

4
- (Italy) A Giannessi
- (Italy) G Naso
w/o

- (Brazil) T Monteiro
- (Spain) R Ramírez Hidalgo
6^{6}
0

- (Spain) R Carballés Baena
- (Argentina) JI Londero
7
3
[10]

2
- (Argentina) F Bagnis
- (Argentina) M González
7^{7}
6

WC
- (Chile) G Rivera Aránguiz
- (Chile) JC Sáez
5
6
[6]

- (Spain) R Carballés Baena
- (Argentina) JI Londero
2
2

WC
(Chile) MT Barrios Vera
(Chile) Jorge Montero
7
4
[5]

2
- (Argentina) F Bagnis
- (Argentina) M González
6
6

2
- (Argentina) F Bagnis
- (Argentina) M González
5
6
[10]
