= 2014 Challenger ATP Cachantún Cup – Doubles =

Doubles
- 2014 Challenger ATP Cachantún Cup

Final
- Champions: (Chile) Cristian Garín; (Chile) Nicolás Jarry
- Runners-up: (Chile) Jorge Aguilar; (Chile) Hans Podlipnik Castillo
- Score: Walkover

Events
Singles	Doubles
← 2013 ·	Challenger ATP Cachantún Cup	· 2015 →

Marcelo Demoliner and João Souza were the defending champions, but decided to compete São Paulo instead.

Cristian Garín and Nicolás Jarry won the title when Jorge Aguilar and Hans Podlipnik Castillo withdrew.

== Seeds ==
1. (Dominican Republic) José Hernández / (Argentina) Eduardo Schwank (semifinals)
2. (Bolivia) Hugo Dellien / (Argentina) Renzo Olivo (semifinals)
3. (Chile) Jorge Aguilar / (Chile) Hans Podlipnik Castillo (final, withdrew)
4. (Argentina) Guido Andreozzi / (Argentina) Andrea Collarini (quarterfinals)

== Draw ==
=== Key ===
- Q = Qualifier
- WC = Wild card
- LL = Lucky loser
- Alt = Alternate
- SE = Special exempt
- PR = Protected ranking
- ITF = ITF entry
- JE = Junior exempt
- w/o = Walkover
- r = Retired
- d = Defaulted
- SR = Special ranking

=== Draw ===
First round

Quarterfinals

Semifinals

Final

1
- (Dominican Republic) J Hernández
- (Argentina) E Schwank
7
6

WC
(Chile) David Fleming
(Chile) Victor Núñez
5
1

1
- (Dominican Republic) J Hernández
- (Argentina) E Schwank
7^{7}
6

- (Austria) D Novak
- (Belgium) Y Reuter
7^{11}
4
[4]

WC
- (Argentina) A Fabbri
- (Argentina) T Lipovšek Puches
6^{3}
2

WC
- (Argentina) A Fabbri
- (Argentina) T Lipovšek Puches
6^{9}
6
[10]

1
- (Dominican Republic) J Hernández
- (Argentina) E Schwank
6
4
[7]

4
- (Argentina) G Andreozzi
- (Argentina) A Collarini
6
3
[10]

- (Chile) C Garin
- (Chile) N Jarry
2
6
[10]

(Argentina) F Coria
(Argentina) P Heras
2
6
[7]

4
- (Argentina) G Andreozzi
- (Argentina) A Collarini

- (Ecuador) E Gómez
- (Chile) G Lama
6^{4}
6
[9]

- (Chile) C Garin
- (Chile) N Jarry
w/o

- (Chile) C Garin
- (Chile) N Jarry
7^{7}
1
[11]

- (Chile) C Garin
- (Chile) N Jarry
w/o

- (Brazil) Wilson Leite
- (Italy) G Quinzi
5
4

3
- (Chile) J Aguilar
- (Chile) H Podlipnik

PR
- (Ecuador) G Lapentti
- (United States) W Odesnik
7
6

PR
- (Ecuador) G Lapentti
- (United States) W Odesnik
4
1

- (Australia) J Duckworth
- (United States) D Kudla
3
6^{4}

3
- (Chile) J Aguilar
- (Chile) H Podlipnik
6
6

3
- (Chile) J Aguilar
- (Chile) H Podlipnik
6
7^{7}

3
- (Chile) J Aguilar
- (Chile) H Podlipnik
4
6
[10]

- (France) M Bourgue
- (France) L Pouille
7^{7}
6

2
- (Bolivia) H Dellien
- (Argentina) R Olivo
6
3
[6]

WC
(Argentina) P Cachin
(Chile) Guillermo Núñez
6^{2}
2

- (France) M Bourgue
- (France) L Pouille
2
1

- (Chile) G Rivera Aránguiz
- (Chile) C Saavedra-Corvalán
3
6^{9}

2
- (Bolivia) H Dellien
- (Argentina) R Olivo
6
6

2
- (Bolivia) H Dellien
- (Argentina) R Olivo
6
7^{11}
