= 2015 Challenger ATP Cachantún Cup =

- Date: 9 – 15 March
- Edition: 8th
- Draw: 32S / 16D
- Prize money: $40,000+H
- Surface: Red clay
- Location: Santiago, Chile

Champions

Singles
- (Argentina) Facundo Bagnis

Doubles
- (Argentina) Andrés Molteni / (Argentina) Guido Pella
← 2014 ·	Challenger ATP Cachantún Cup	· 2016 →

The 2015 Challenger ATP Cachantún Cup was a professional tennis tournament played on red clay courts. It was the 8th edition of the tournament which was part of the 2015 ATP Challenger Tour. It took place in Santiago, Chile between 9 and 15 March 2015.

== Singles main-draw entrants ==
=== Seeds ===
Country	Player	Rank^{1}	Seed
BRA	~~João Souza~~	~~75~~	~~1~~
COL	Alejandro González	90	2
ARG	Máximo González	96	3
ARG	Facundo Bagnis	120	4
ARG	Horacio Zeballos	138	5
ARG	Facundo Argüello	140	6
CHI	Hans Podlipnik Castillo	177	7
ARG	Renzo Olivo	190	8

- ^{1} Rankings are as of March 2, 2015

=== Other entrants ===
The following players received wildcards into the singles main draw:

- (Chile) Juan Carlos Sáez
- (Chile) Jorge Aguilar
- (Chile) Guillermo Rivera Aránguiz
- (Chile) Bastián Malla

The following players received entry from the qualifying draw:

- (Italy) Gianluigi Quinzi
- (Brazil) Caio Zampieri
- (Brazil) Thiago Monteiro
- (Argentina) Andrea Collarini

The following players received entry as lucky losers:

- (Brazil) Ricardo Hocevar
- (Argentina) Patricio Heras

== Champions ==
=== Singles ===
- (Argentina) Facundo Bagnis def. (Brazil) Guilherme Clezar, 6–2, 5–7, 6–2

=== Doubles ===
- (Argentina) Andrés Molteni / (Argentina) Guido Pella def. (Argentina) Andrea Collarini / (Argentina) Máximo González, 7–6^{(9–7)}, 3–6, [10–4]
