= 2011 Cachantún Cup =

- Date: 7–13 March
- Edition: 6th
- Location: Santiago, Chile

Champions

Singles
- (Argentina) Máximo González

Doubles
- (Argentina) Máximo González / (Argentina) Horacio Zeballos
← 2009 ·	Cachantún Cup (ATP)	· 2012 →

The 2011 Cachantún Cup was a professional tennis tournament played on clay courts. It was the sixth edition of the tournament which was part of the 2011 ATP Challenger Tour. It took place in Santiago, Chile between 7 and 13 March 2011.

== ATP entrants ==
=== Seeds ===
Country	Player	Rank^{1}	Seed
ARG	Horacio Zeballos	100	1
ARG	Máximo González	123	2
BRA	João Souza	126	3
FRA	Éric Prodon	136	4
ARG	Diego Junqueira	163	5
CHI	Paul Capdeville	165	6
BRA	Rogério Dutra da Silva	166	7
CRO	Franko Škugor	167	8

- Rankings are as of February 28, 2011.

=== Other entrants ===
The following players received wildcards into the singles main draw:

- (Chile) Jorge Montero
- (Chile) Guillermo Rivera Aránguiz
- (Chile) Cristóbal Saavedra-Corvalán
- (Chile) Juan Carlos Sáez

The following players received entry from the qualifying draw:

- (Chile) Guillermo Hormazábal
- (Brazil) José Pereira
- (Argentina) Diego Schwartzman
- (Italy) Stefano Travaglia

== Champions ==
=== Singles ===
(Argentina) Máximo González def. (France) Éric Prodon, 7–5, 0–6, 6–2

=== Doubles ===
(Argentina) Máximo González / (Argentina) Horacio Zeballos def. (Chile) Guillermo Rivera Aránguiz / (Chile) Cristóbal Saavedra-Corvalán, 6–3, 6–4
