= 2008 Challenger de Providencia – Singles =

Singles
- 2008 Challenger de Providencia

Final
- Champion: (Brazil) Thomaz Bellucci
- Runner-up: (Argentina) Eduardo Schwank
- Score: 6–4, 7–6^{(7–3)}

Events
| Singles | Doubles |
| ← 2007 · | Challenger ATP Cachantún Cup | · 2009 → |

Martín Vassallo Argüello was the defending champion, but chose to compete in Acapulco at the same week.

Thomaz Bellucci won the title by defeating Eduardo Schwank 6–4, 7–6^{(7–3)} in the final.

== Seeds ==
1. (Spain) Rubén Ramírez Hidalgo (quarterfinals)
2. (Spain) Iván Navarro (first round)
3. (Argentina) Eduardo Schwank (final)
4. (Spain) Daniel Gimeno Traver (second round)
5. (Argentina) Brian Dabul (first round)
6. (Brazil) Thomaz Bellucci (champion)
7. (Spain) Adrián Menéndez-Maceiras (first round)
8. (Brazil) Júlio Silva (first round)

== Draw ==
=== Key ===
- Q = Qualifier
- WC = Wild card
- LL = Lucky loser
- Alt = Alternate
- SE = Special exempt
- PR = Protected ranking
- ITF = ITF entry
- JE = Junior exempt
- w/o = Walkover
- r = Retired
- d = Defaulted
- SR = Special ranking

=== Finals ===
Semifinals
6 | (Brazil) Thomaz Bellucci | 6 | 6^{5} | 6
(Brazil) João Souza | 3 | 7^{7} | 4
3 | (Argentina) Eduardo Schwank | 6 | 3 | 6
(Argentina) Diego Junqueira | 3 | 6 | 1

Final
6 | (Brazil) Thomaz Bellucci | 6 | 7^{7}
3 | (Argentina) Eduardo Schwank | 4 | 6^{3}

=== Top half ===
First round
1 | (Spain) R Ramírez Hidalgo | 7^{7} | 6^{3} | 6
WC | (Chile) H Podlipnik-Castillo | 6^{5} | 7^{7} | 4
(Chile) A García | 2 | 5
Q | (Argentina) JP Amado | 6 | 7
(Spain) M López | 7^{7} | 6
(Argentina) M Puerta | 6^{5} | 2
Q | (Argentina) D Veronelli | 3 | 4
6 | (Brazil) T Bellucci | 6 | 6
4 | (Spain) D Gimeno Traver | 6 | 6
WC | (Chile) G Rivera Aránguiz | 4 | 0
(Brazil) J Souza | 4 | 6 | 6
(Argentina) H Zeballos | 6 | 3 | 1
WC | (Chile) R Urzúa Rivera | 6^{3} | 1
(Brazil) F Ferreiro | 7^{7} | 6
(Italy) S Vagnozzi | 6 | 6
8 | (Brazil) J Silva | 1 | 1

Second round
1 | (Spain) R Ramírez Hidalgo | 6 | 7^{7}
Q | (Argentina) JP Amado | 3 | 6^{5}
(Spain) M López | 1 | 4
6 | (Brazil) T Bellucci | 6 | 6
4 | (Spain) D Gimeno Traver | 6 | 4 | 3
(Brazil) J Souza | 3 | 6 | 6
(Brazil) F Ferreiro | 7 | 6^{2} | 1
(Italy) S Vagnozzi | 5 | 7^{7} | 6

Quarterfinals
1 | (Spain) R Ramírez Hidalgo | 4 | 0
6 | (Brazil) T Bellucci | 6 | 6
(Brazil) J Souza | 7^{7} | 6^{3} | 6
(Italy) S Vagnozzi | 6^{1} | 7^{7} | 2

Semifinals
6 | (Brazil) T Bellucci | 6 | 6^{5} | 6
(Brazil) J Souza | 3 | 7^{7} | 4

=== Bottom half ===
First round
5 | (Argentina) B Dabul | 4 | 2
(Spain) D Marrero | 6 | 6
(Argentina) G Marcaccio | 4 | 7 | 3
(Argentina) S Decoud | 6 | 5 | 6
(Paraguay) R Delgado | 4 | 2
(Brazil) C Zampieri | 6 | 6
WC | (Chile) J Peralta | 4 | 4
3 | (Argentina) E Schwank | 6 | 6
7 | (Spain) A Menéndez-Maceiras | 6^{5} | 6^{2}
Q | (Canada) P Polansky | 7^{7} | 7^{7}
(Czech Republic) A Vejmělka | 2 | 5
(Italy) F Aldi | 6 | 7
Q | (Brazil) R Dutra Silva | 2 | 1
(Argentina) D Junqueira | 6 | 6
(Brazil) T Alves | 6 | 7^{7}
2 | (Spain) I Navarro | 2 | 6^{4}

Second round
(Spain) D Marrero | 4 | 2
(Argentina) S Decoud | 6 | 6
(Brazil) C Zampieri | 1 | 3
3 | (Argentina) E Schwank | 6 | 6
Q | (Canada) P Polansky | 6 | 7^{7}
(Italy) F Aldi | 3 | 6^{2}
(Argentina) D Junqueira | 6 | 6
(Brazil) T Alves | 2 | 3

Quarterfinals
(Argentina) S Decoud | 1 | 0
3 | (Argentina) E Schwank | 6 | 6
Q | (Canada) P Polansky | 5 | 1
(Argentina) D Junqueira | 7 | 6

Semifinals
3 | (Argentina) E Schwank | 6 | 3 | 6
(Argentina) D Junqueira | 3 | 6 | 1
