= 2012 Cachantún Cup – Doubles =

Doubles
- 2012 Cachantún Cup

Final
- Champions: (Chile) Paul Capdeville (Uruguay) Marcel Felder
- Runners-up: (Chile) Jorge Aguilar (Mexico) Daniel Garza
- Score: 6–7^{(3–7)}, 6–4, [10–7]

Events
Singles	Doubles
← 2011 ·	Cachantún Cup	· 2013 →

Máximo González and Horacio Zeballos were the defending champions, but did not participate this year.
Paul Capdeville and Marcel Felder won the title, defeating Jorge Aguilar and Daniel Garza 6–7^{(3–7)}, 6–4, [10–7].

== Seeds ==
1. (Argentina) Facundo Bagnis / (Argentina) Eduardo Schwank (semifinals, withdrew)
2. (Argentina) Guido Andreozzi / (Brazil) Fernando Romboli (semifinals)
3. (Argentina) Martín Alund / (Argentina) Andrés Molteni (quarterfinals)
4. (Chile) Paul Capdeville / (Uruguay) Marcel Felder (champions)

== Draw ==
=== Key ===
- Q = Qualifier
- WC = Wild card
- LL = Lucky loser
- Alt = Alternate
- SE = Special exempt
- PR = Protected ranking
- ITF = ITF entry
- JE = Junior exempt
- w/o = Walkover
- r = Retired
- d = Defaulted
- SR = Special ranking

=== Draw ===
First round
1	(Argentina) F Bagnis (Argentina) E Schwank	6^{3}	7^{7}	[10]
(Croatia) N Mektić (Croatia) A Veić	7^{7}	6^{1}	[4]
WC	(Chile) Javier Munoz (Chile) JC Saez	5	4
(Spain) J Martí (Argentina) A Velotti	7	6
3	(Argentina) M Alund (Argentina) A Molteni	6^{6}	6	[10]
WC	(Chile) G Rivera-Aránguiz (Chile) C Saavedra-Corvalán	7^{8}	3	[4]
(Serbia) N Ćirić (Montenegro) G Tošić	6^{9}	4
(Chile) J Aguilar (Mexico) D Garza	7^{11}	6
WC	(Chile) G Lama (Chile) M Sborowitz	1	3
(Brazil) G Clezar (Argentina) S Decoud	6	6
(Argentina) G Durán (Colombia) A González	4	5
4	(Chile) P Capdeville (Uruguay) M Felder	6	7
(Argentina) F Argüello (Argentina) P Galdón	0	6	[10]
(Brazil) R Dutra da Silva (Brazil) L Kirche	6	3	[6]
(France) A Gensse (France) G Rufin	2	5
2	(Argentina) G Andreozzi (Brazil) F Romboli	6	7

Quarterfinals
1	(Argentina) F Bagnis (Argentina) E Schwank	6	6
(Spain) J Martí (Argentina) A Velotti	4	1
3	(Argentina) M Alund (Argentina) A Molteni	4	4
(Chile) J Aguilar (Mexico) D Garza	6	6
(Brazil) G Clezar (Argentina) S Decoud	3	4
4	(Chile) P Capdeville (Uruguay) M Felder	6	6
(Argentina) F Argüello (Argentina) P Galdón	2	0
2	(Argentina) G Andreozzi (Brazil) F Romboli	6	6

Semifinals
1	(Argentina) F Bagnis (Argentina) E Schwank
(Chile) J Aguilar (Mexico) D Garza	w/o
4	(Chile) P Capdeville (Uruguay) M Felder	6	3	[10]
2	(Argentina) G Andreozzi (Brazil) F Romboli	4	6	[6]

Final
(Chile) J Aguilar (Mexico) D Garza	7^{7}	4	[7]
4	(Chile) P Capdeville (Uruguay) M Felder	6^{3}	6	[10]
