= 2013 Cachantún Cup =

- Date: 4–10 March
- Edition: 6th
- Draw: 32S / 16D
- Prize money: $35,000+H
- Surface: Clay
- Location: Santiago, Chile

Champions

Singles
- (Argentina) Facundo Bagnis

Doubles
- (Brazil) Marcelo Demoliner / (Brazil) João Souza
← 2012 ·	Cachantún Cup (ATP)	· 2014 →

The 2013 Cachantún Cup was a professional tennis tournament played on clay courts. It was the sixth edition of the tournament which was part of the 2013 ATP Challenger Tour. It took place in Santiago, Chile between 4 and 10 March.

== ATP entrants ==
=== Seeds ===
Country	Player	Rank^{1}	Seed
ARG	Martín Alund	91	1
NED	Thiemo de Bakker	110	2
BRA	Rogério Dutra da Silva	115	3
ARG	Federico Delbonis	118	4
CRO	Antonio Veić	129	5
BRA	João Souza	132	6
CHI	Paul Capdeville	144	7
ARG	Diego Sebastián Schwartzman	157	8

- ^{1} Rankings are as of February 25, 2013.

=== Other entrants ===
The following players received wildcards into the singles main draw:

- (Chile) Christian Garín
- (Chile) Gonzalo Lama
- (Chile) Nicolas Massú
- (Chile) Matías Sborowitz

The following players received entry as a special exempt into the singles main draw:

- (Argentina) Renzo Olivo

The following players received entry from the qualifying draw:

- (Argentina) Andrea Collarini
- (Slovakia) Jozef Kovalík
- (Spain) Pere Riba
- (Chile) Juan Carlos Sáez

== Doubles main draw entrants ==
=== Seeds ===
Country	Player	Country	Player	Rank^{1}	Seed
BRA	Marcelo Demoliner	BRA	João Souza	196	1
AUS	Jordan Kerr	SWE	Andreas Siljeström	217	2
ARG	Martín Alund	ARG	Facundo Bagnis	268	3
CHI	Paul Capdeville	URU	Marcel Felder	432	4

- ^{1} Rankings as of February 24, 2013.

=== Other entrants ===
The following pairs received wildcards into the doubles main draw:

- (Chile) Jorge Aguilar / (Chile) Nicolás Massú
- (Chile) Christian Garín / (Chile) Gonzalo Lama
- (Chile) Hans Podlipnik / (Chile) Juan Carlos Sáez

== Champions ==
=== Singles ===
- (Argentina) Facundo Bagnis def. (Netherlands) Thiemo de Bakker, 7–6^{(7–2)}, 7–6^{(7–3)}

=== Doubles ===
- (Brazil) Marcelo Demoliner / (Brazil) João Souza def. (Argentina) Federico Delbonis / (Argentina) Diego Junqueira, 7–5, 6–1
