= 2008 Challenger de Providencia – Doubles =

Doubles
- 2008 Challenger de Providencia

Final
- Champions: (Argentina) Mariano Hood (Argentina) Eduardo Schwank
- Runners-up: (Argentina) Brian Dabul (Netherlands Antilles) Jean-Julien Rojer
- Score: 6–3, 6–3

Events
Singles	Doubles
← 2007 ·	Challenger ATP Cachantún Cup	· 2009 →

Brian Dabul and Marc López were the defending champions, but competed this year with different partners. Dabul teamed up with Jean-Julien Rojer and ended as runners-up, while López teamed up with David Marrero and lost in first round to Francesco Aldi and Simone Vagnozzi.

Mariano Hood and Eduardo Schwank won the title by defeating Brian Dabul and Jean-Julien Rojer 6–3, 6–3 in the final.

== Seeds ==
1. (Argentina) Brian Dabul / (Netherlands Antilles) Jean-Julien Rojer (final)
2. (Brazil) Thomaz Bellucci / (Spain) Rubén Ramírez Hidalgo (quarterfinals)
3. (Argentina) Sebastián Decoud / (Argentina) Horacio Zeballos (first round, withdrew)
4. (Brazil) Franco Ferreiro / (Uruguay) Martín Vilarrubí (first round)

== Draw ==
=== Key ===
- Q = Qualifier
- WC = Wild card
- LL = Lucky loser
- Alt = Alternate
- SE = Special exempt
- PR = Protected ranking
- ITF = ITF entry
- JE = Junior exempt
- w/o = Walkover
- r = Retired
- d = Defaulted
- SR = Special ranking

=== Draw ===
First round
1	(Argentina) B Dabul (Netherlands Antilles) J-J Rojer	6	6
(Brazil) J Souza (Brazil) C Zampieri	1	0
(Argentina) D Álvarez (Czech Republic) A Vejmělka	6	6
(Brazil) T Alves (Brazil) J Silva	4	0
4	(Brazil) F Ferreiro (Uruguay) M Vilarrubí	3	5
(Argentina) D Junqueira (Argentina) L Migani	6	7
(Spain) M López (Spain) D Marrero	4	3
(Italy) F Aldi (Italy) S Vagnozzi	6	6
(Chile) J Aguilar (Chile) A García	6	6
WC	(Chile) G Hormazábal (Chile) H Podlipnik	4	4
(Argentina) G Marcaccio (Spain) A Menéndez
3	(Argentina) S Decoud (Argentina) H Zeballos
WC	(Chile) G Rivera (Chile) R Urzúa-Rivera	4	3
WC	(Argentina) M Hood (Argentina) E Schwank	6	6
(Spain) D Gimeno Traver (Spain) I Navarro	4	6^{4}
2	(Brazil) T Bellucci (Spain) R Ramírez Hidalgo	6	7^{7}

Quarterfinals
1	(Argentina) B Dabul (Netherlands Antilles) J-J Rojer	6	6
(Argentina) D Álvarez (Czech Republic) A Vejmělka	1	1
(Argentina) D Junqueira (Argentina) L Migani	w/o
(Italy) F Aldi (Italy) S Vagnozzi
(Chile) J Aguilar (Chile) A García	w/o
Double w/o
WC	(Argentina) M Hood (Argentina) E Schwank	5	6	[12]
2	(Brazil) T Bellucci (Spain) R Ramírez Hidalgo	7	3	[10]

Semifinals
1	(Argentina) B Dabul (Netherlands Antilles) J-J Rojer	6	6
(Argentina) D Junqueira (Argentina) L Migani	3	1
(Chile) J Aguilar (Chile) A García
WC	(Argentina) M Hood (Argentina) E Schwank	w/o

Final
1	(Argentina) B Dabul (Netherlands Antilles) J-J Rojer	3	3
WC	(Argentina) M Hood (Argentina) E Schwank	6	6
