= 2016 Challenger ATP Cachantún Cup =

- Date: 7 – 13 March
- Edition: 9th
- Draw: 32S / 16D
- Prize money: $50,000+H
- Surface: Red clay
- Location: Santiago, Chile

Champions

Singles
- (Argentina) Facundo Bagnis

Doubles
- (Chile) Julio Peralta / (Chile) Hans Podlipnik
← 2015 ·	Challenger ATP Cachantún Cup	· 2017 →

The 2016 Challenger ATP Cachantún Cup was a professional tennis tournament played on red clay courts. It was the 9th edition of the tournament which was part of the 2016 ATP Challenger Tour. It took place in Santiago, Chile between 7 and 13 March 2016.

== Singles main-draw entrants ==
=== Seeds ===
Country	Player	Rank^{1}	Seed
ARG	Facundo Bagnis	95	1
ESP	Roberto Carballés Baena	106	2
BRA	Rogério Dutra Silva	115	3
ARG	Máximo González	140	4
ARG	~~Carlos Berlocq~~	~~141~~	5
ARG	Facundo Argüello	143	6
ARG	Nicolás Kicker	155	7
BRA	Guilherme Clezar	176	8

- ^{1} Rankings are as of February 29, 2016

=== Other entrants ===
The following players received wildcards into the singles main draw:

- (Chile) Gonzalo Achondo
- (Chile) Marcelo Tomás Barrios Vera
- (Chile) Cristian Garín
- (Brazil) Thiago Monteiro

The following players received entry from the qualifying draw:

- (Argentina) Federico Coria
- (Argentina) Maximiliano Estévez
- (France) Adrien Puget
- (Brazil) Pedro Sakamoto

The following player received entry as a lucky loser:

- (Chile) Guillermo Rivera Aránguiz

== Champions ==
=== Singles ===
- (Argentina) Facundo Bagnis def. (Brazil) Rogério Dutra Silva, 6–7^{(3–7)}, 6–4, 6–3

=== Doubles ===
- (Chile) Julio Peralta / (Chile) Hans Podlipnik def. (Argentina) Facundo Bagnis / (Argentina) Máximo González, 7–6^{(7–4)}, 4–6, [10–5]
