= 2016 Challenger ATP Cachantún Cup – Singles =

Singles
- 2016 Challenger ATP Cachantún Cup

Final
- Champion: (Argentina) Facundo Bagnis
- Runner-up: (Brazil) Rogério Dutra Silva
- Score: 6–7^{(3–7)}, 6–4, 6–3

Events
Singles	Doubles
- Challenger ATP Cachantún Cup

Facundo Bagnis defended his title by repeating as champion, defeating Rogério Dutra Silva 6–7^{(3–7)}, 6–4, 6–3 in the final.

== Seeds ==
1. (Argentina) Facundo Bagnis (champion)
2. (Spain) Roberto Carballés Baena (second round)
3. (Brazil) Rogério Dutra Silva (final)
4. (Argentina) Máximo González (second round)
5. (Argentina) Carlos Berlocq (withdrew)
6. (Argentina) Facundo Argüello (second round)
7. (Argentina) Nicolás Kicker (first round)
8. (Brazil) Guilherme Clezar (quarterfinals)

== Draw ==
Key

- Q = Qualifier
- WC = Wild card
- LL = Lucky loser
- Alt = Alternate
- ITF = ITF entry
- PR = Protected ranking
- SR = Special ranking
- SE = Special exempt
- JE = Junior exempt
- JR = Junior Accelerator Programme entrant
- CO = College Accelerator Programme entrant
- NG = Next Gen Accelerator Program entrant
- w/o = Walkover
- r = Retired
- d = Defaulted

=== Finals ===
Semifinals
1	(Argentina) Facundo Bagnis	6	6
(Chile) Gonzalo Lama	1	2
3	(Brazil) Rogério Dutra Silva	6	6^{5}	6
WC	(Brazil) Thiago Monteiro	3	7^{7}	3

Final
1	(Argentina) Facundo Bagnis	6^{3}	6	6
3	(Brazil) Rogério Dutra Silva	7^{7}	4	3

=== Top half ===
First round
1	(Argentina) F Bagnis	6	6
WC	(Chile) MT Barrios Vera	2	4
(Argentina) T Lipovšek Puches	2	6	6
(Italy) G Naso	6	3	3
Q	(Argentina) Maximiliano Estévez	6	7^{7}
(Chile) JC Sáez	2	6^{5}
WC	(Chile) Gonzalo Achondo	1	1
LL	(Chile) G Rivera Aránguiz	6	6
4	(Argentina) M González	6	6
(Spain) J Samper Montaña	4	2
WC	(Chile) C Garín	3	6	4
(Spain) R Ramírez Hidalgo	6	2	6
(Italy) A Giannessi	7^{7}	7
(Sweden) C Lindell	6^{5}	5
(Chile) G Lama	6	6
7	(Argentina) N Kicker	4	1

Second round
1	(Argentina) F Bagnis	6	6
(Argentina) T Lipovšek Puches	1	2
Q	(Argentina) M Estévez	6	3	6
LL	(Chile) G Rivera Aránguiz	1	6	3
4	(Argentina) M González	3	6	4
(Spain) R Ramírez Hidalgo	6	3	6
(Italy) A Giannessi	7	2	6^{0}
(Chile) G Lama	5	6	7^{7}

Quarterfinals
1	(Argentina) F Bagnis	6	6
Q	(Argentina) M Estévez	4	0
(Spain) R Ramírez Hidalgo	7^{9}	3	6^{4}
(Chile) G Lama	6^{7}	6	7^{7}

Semifinals
1	(Argentina) F Bagnis	6	6
(Chile) G Lama	1	2

=== Bottom half ===
First round
8	(Brazil) G Clezar	3	6	6
Q	(France) Adrien Puget	6	1	3
(Spain) O Roca Batalla	6^{4}	4
(France) M Bourgue	7^{7}	6
(France) M Chazal	4	1
(Dominican Republic) J Hernández	6	6
(Austria) M Linzer	0	1
3	(Brazil) R Dutra Silva	6	6
6	(Argentina) F Argüello	6	6
Q	(Brazil) P Sakamoto	1	0
WC	(Brazil) T Monteiro	6	7^{7}
(Chile) H Podlipnik	2	6^{1}
(Argentina) JI Londero	7^{7}	6
(Brazil) J Pereira	6^{5}	3
Q	(Argentina) F Coria	2	3
2	(Spain) R Carballés Baena	6	6

Second round
8	(Brazil) G Clezar	6	7^{7}
(France) M Bourgue	4	6^{5}
(Dominican Republic) J Hernández	6^{5}	3
3	(Brazil) R Dutra Silva	7^{7}	6
6	(Argentina) F Argüello	6	3	6^{5}
WC	(Brazil) T Monteiro	4	6	7^{7}
(Argentina) JI Londero	6	1	6
2	(Spain) R Carballés Baena	2	6	3

Quarterfinals
8	(Brazil) G Clezar	3	5
3	(Brazil) R Dutra Silva	6	7
WC	(Brazil) T Monteiro	7^{7}	6
(Argentina) JI Londero	6^{2}	2

Semifinals
3	(Brazil) R Dutra Silva	6	6^{5}	6
WC	(Brazil) T Monteiro	3	7^{7}	3
