= 2008 Challenger de Providencia =

- Date: 25 February – 2 March
- Edition: 4th
- Category: ATP Challenger Series
- Draw: 32S/32Q/16D
- Prize money: USD35,000
- Surface: Clay / outdoor
- Location: Providencia, Santiago, Chile
- Venue: Club Providencia

Champions

Singles
- (Brazil) Thomaz Bellucci

Doubles
- (Argentina) Mariano Hood / (Argentina) Eduardo Schwank
- Challenger ATP Cachantún Cup

The 2008 Challenger de Providencia, also named Copa Kia for sponsorship reasons, was a men's tennis tournament played on outdoor clay courts. It was the 4th edition of the event, and part of the 2008 ATP Challenger Series of the 2008 ATP Tour. It took place at the tennis courts at the Club Providencia in Providencia, Santiago, Chile, from 25 February through 2 March 2008.

== Points and prize money ==
=== Point distribution ===
Event	W	F	SF	QF	Round of 16	Round of 32	Q	Q3	Q2	Q1
Singles	55	38	24	13	5	0	2	—N/a		
Doubles	55	38	24	13	0	—N/a				

=== Prize money ===
Event	W	F	SF	QF	Round of 16	Round of 32	Q3	Q2	Q1
Singles	$5,000	$3,000	$1,755	$1,020	$600	$365	—N/a		
Doubles *	$2,200	$1,250	$760	$450	$250	—N/a			

_{* per team}

== Singles main draw entrants ==
=== Seeds ===
Country	Player	Rank^{1}	Seed
ESP	Rubén Ramírez Hidalgo	123	1
ESP	Iván Navarro	126	2
ARG	Eduardo Schwank	141	3
ESP	Daniel Gimeno Traver	157	4
ARG	Brian Dabul	158	5
BRA	Thomaz Bellucci	181	6
ESP	Adrián Menéndez-Maceiras	188	7
BRA	Júlio Silva	195	8

^{1} Rankings as of 18 February 2008.

=== Other entrants ===
The following players received wildcards into the singles main draw:

- (Chile) Julio Peralta
- (Chile) Hans Podlipnik-Castillo
- (Chile) Guillermo Rivera Aránguiz
- (Chile) Ricardo Urzúa Rivera

The following players received entry from the qualifying draw:

- (Argentina) Juan Pablo Amado
- (Brazil) Rogério Dutra Silva
- (Canada) Peter Polansky
- (Argentina) Diego Veronelli

== Doubles main draw entrants ==
=== Seeds ===
Country	Player	Country	Player	Rank^{1}	Seed
ARG	Brian Dabul	AHO	Jean-Julien Rojer	281	1
BRA	Thomaz Bellucci	ESP	Rubén Ramírez Hidalgo	291	2
ARG	Sebastián Decoud	ARG	Horacio Zeballos	293	3
BRA	Franco Ferreiro	URU	Martín Vilarrubí	423	4

^{1} Rankings as of 18 February 2008.

=== Other entrants ===
The following pairs received wildcards into the doubles main draw:

- (Chile) Guillermo Hormazábal / (Chile) Hans Podlipnik-Castillo
- (Argentina) Mariano Hood / (Argentina) Eduardo Schwank
- (Chile) Guillermo Rivera Aránguiz / (Chile) Ricardo Urzúa Rivera

=== Withdrawals ===
During the tournament

- (Argentina) Gustavo Marcaccio / (Spain) Adrián Menéndez-Maceiras → in first round
- (Argentina) Sebastián Decoud / (Argentina) Horacio Zeballos → in first round
- (Italy) Francesco Aldi / (Italy) Simone Vagnozzi → in quarterfinals
- (Chile) Jorge Aguilar / (Chile) Adrián García → in semifinals

== Champions ==
=== Singles ===
- (Brazil) Thomaz Bellucci defeated (Argentina) Eduardo Schwank, 6–4, 7–6^{(7–3)}

=== Doubles ===
- (Argentina) Mariano Hood / (Argentina) Eduardo Schwank defeated (Argentina) Brian Dabul / (Netherlands Antilles) Jean-Julien Rojer, 6–3, 6–3
