= 2019 Challenger ATP Cachantún Cup – Singles =

Singles
- 2019 Challenger ATP Cachantún Cup

Final
- Champion: (Bolivia) Hugo Dellien
- Runner-up: (Chinese Taipei) Wu Tung-lin
- Score: 5–7, 7–6^{(7–1)}, 6–1

Events
Singles	Doubles
- Challenger ATP Cachantún Cup

Marco Cecchinato was the defending champion but chose not to defend his title.

Hugo Dellien won the title after defeating Wu Tung-lin 5–7, 7–6^{(7–1)}, 6–1 in the final.

== Seeds ==
All seeds receive a bye into the second round.

1. (Spain) Pablo Andújar (semifinals)
2. (Bolivia) Hugo Dellien (champion)
3. (Brazil) Thiago Monteiro (quarterfinals)
4. (Brazil) Rogério Dutra Silva (third round)
5. (Argentina) Facundo Bagnis (third round)
6. (Italy) Alessandro Giannessi (quarterfinals)
7. (Spain) Pedro Martínez (quarterfinals)
8. (Spain) Daniel Gimeno Traver (third round)
9. (Argentina) Facundo Argüello (third round)
10. (Belgium) Kimmer Coppejans (quarterfinals)
11. (Italy) Matteo Donati (second round)
12. (Portugal) João Domingues (second round)
13. (Italy) Gian Marco Moroni (third round)
14. (Italy) Federico Gaio (third round)
15. (Brazil) Thomaz Bellucci (semifinals)
16. (Slovakia) Andrej Martin (third round)

== Draw ==
Key

- Q = Qualifier
- WC = Wild card
- LL = Lucky loser
- Alt = Alternate
- ITF = ITF entry
- PR = Protected ranking
- SR = Special ranking
- SE = Special exempt
- JE = Junior exempt
- JR = Junior Accelerator Programme entrant
- CO = College Accelerator Programme entrant
- NG = Next Gen Accelerator Program entrant
- w/o = Walkover
- r = Retired
- d = Defaulted

=== Finals ===
Quarterfinals
1/WC	(Spain) Pablo Andújar	7	7
7	(Spain) Pedro Martínez	5	5
3	(Brazil) Thiago Monteiro	7	4	5
(Chinese Taipei) Wu Tung-lin	5	6	7
6	(Italy) Alessandro Giannessi	6	4	4
15	(Brazil) Thomaz Bellucci	3	6	6
10	(Belgium) Kimmer Coppejans	4	2
2	(Bolivia) Hugo Dellien	6	6

Semifinals
1/WC	(Spain) Pablo Andújar	2	3
(Chinese Taipei) Wu Tung-lin	6	6
15	(Brazil) Thomaz Bellucci	4	0
2	(Bolivia) Hugo Dellien	6	6

Final
(Chinese Taipei) Wu Tung-lin	7	6^{1}	1
2	(Bolivia) Hugo Dellien	5	7^{7}	6

=== Top half ===
==== Section 1 ====
First round
(Brazil) P Sakamoto	6	2	3
(Brazil) T Seyboth Wild	2	6	6
(France) A Müller	6	6^{4}	1
Q	(Argentina) G Villanueva	4	7^{7}	6
(Spain) C Taberner	6	3	6
(Uruguay) M Cuevas	3	6	1
(Germany) J Härteis	6	0	6
(India) S Nagal	4	6	3

Second round
1/WC	(Spain) P Andújar	6	4	6
(Brazil) T Seyboth Wild	4	6	2
Q	(Argentina) G Villanueva	6	3	3
14	(Italy) F Gaio	3	6	6
12	(Portugal) J Domingues	3	3
(Spain) C Taberner	6	6
(Germany) J Härteis	1	4
7	(Spain) P Martínez	6	6

Third round
1/WC	(Spain) P Andújar	6	6
14	(Italy) F Gaio	3	3
(Spain) C Taberner	5	5
7	(Spain) P Martínez	7	7

Quarterfinals
1/WC	(Spain) P Andújar	7	7
7	(Spain) P Martínez	5	5

==== Section 2 ====
First round
(Peru) JP Varillas	2	6	6
(Argentina) F Coria	6	4	3
PR	(Argentina) F Mena	6^{4}	2
ITF	(Argentina) MF Descotte	7^{7}	6
(Chinese Taipei) T-l Wu	6	6
(Colombia) A González	2	4
WC	(Chile) Bastián Malla	6	6
(Spain) Carlos Boluda-Purkiss	3	1

Second round
3	(Brazil) T Monteiro	6	6
(Peru) JP Varillas	4	3
ITF	(Argentina) MF Descotte	1	3
16	(Slovakia) A Martin	6	6
11	(Italy) M Donati	3	4
(Chinese Taipei) T-l Wu	6	6
WC	(Chile) B Malla	4	3
5	(Argentina) F Bagnis	6	6

Third round
3	(Brazil) T Monteiro	7^{7}	2	6
16	(Slovakia) A Martin	6^{3}	6	3
(Chinese Taipei) T-l Wu	2	6	6
5	(Argentina) F Bagnis	6	1	3

Quarterfinals
3	(Brazil) T Monteiro	7	4	5
(Chinese Taipei) T-l Wu	5	6	7

=== Bottom half ===
==== Section 3 ====
First round
(France) A Rinderknech	4	6	1
(Argentina) A Collarini	6	1	6
ITF	(Brazil) J Souza	6	6
(Spain) G Granollers	1	3
(Argentina) R Olivo	7^{8}	6
WC	(Chile) Víctor Núñez	6^{6}	3
WC	(Chile) A Tabilo	4	4
ITF	(Argentina) C Ugo Carabelli	6	6

Second round
6	(Italy) A Giannessi	7^{7}	5	6
(Argentina) A Collarini	6^{5}	7	4
ITF	(Brazil) J Souza	6	3	4
9	(Argentina) F Argüello	4	6	6
15	(Brazil) T Bellucci	7	6
(Argentina) R Olivo	5	4
ITF	(Argentina) C Ugo Carabelli	3	6	2
4	(Brazil) R Dutra Silva	6	3	6

Third round
6	(Italy) A Giannessi	4	6	6
9	(Argentina) F Argüello	6	4	1
15	(Brazil) T Bellucci	6	6
4	(Brazil) R Dutra Silva	2	2

Quarterfinals
6	(Italy) A Giannessi	6	4	4
15	(Brazil) T Bellucci	3	6	6

==== Section 4 ====
First round
(Ecuador) G Escobar	6	2	6
(Chile) MT Barrios Vera	3	6	3
WC	(Chile) G Lama	3	6	6
Q	(Argentina) F Cerúndolo	6	4	3
(Germany) Tobias Simon	4	4
(Ecuador) E Gómez	6	6
ITF	(Brazil) J Menezes	6	7^{7}
(Russia) A Avidzba	2	6^{4}

Second round
8	(Spain) D Gimeno Traver	6	6
(Ecuador) G Escobar	3	4
WC	(Chile) G Lama	4	2
10	(Belgium) K Coppejans	6	6
13	(Italy) GM Moroni	6	6^{9}	6
(Ecuador) E Gómez	3	7^{11}	3
ITF	(Brazil) J Menezes	6	4	4
2	(Bolivia) H Dellien	4	6	6

Third round
8	(Spain) D Gimeno Traver	1	6	1
10	(Belgium) K Coppejans	6	3	6
13	(Italy) GM Moroni	6^{4}	2
2	(Bolivia) H Dellien	7^{7}	6

Quarterfinals
10	(Belgium) K Coppejans	4	2
2	(Bolivia) H Dellien	6	6
