= 2013 Cachantún Cup – Singles =

Singles
- 2013 Cachantún Cup

Final
- Champion: (Argentina) Facundo Bagnis
- Runner-up: (Netherlands) Thiemo de Bakker
- Score: 7–6^{(7–2)}, 7–6^{(7–3)}

Events
Singles	Doubles
← 2012 ·	Cachantún Cup	· 2014 →

Paul Capdeville was the defending champion, but lost in the second round to Marco Trungelliti.
Facundo Bagnis won the title by defeating Thiemo de Bakker 7–6^{(7–2)}, 7–6^{(7–3)} in the final.

== Seeds ==
1. (Argentina) Martín Alund (quarterfinals)
2. (Netherlands) Thiemo de Bakker (final)
3. (Brazil) Rogério Dutra da Silva (second round)
4. (Argentina) Federico Delbonis (quarterfinals)
5. (Croatia) Antonio Veić (semifinals)
6. (Brazil) João Souza (first round)
7. (Chile) Paul Capdeville (second round)
8. (Argentina) Diego Sebastián Schwartzman (first round)

== Draw ==
=== Key ===
- Q = Qualifier
- WC = Wild card
- LL = Lucky loser
- Alt = Alternate
- SE = Special exempt
- PR = Protected ranking
- ITF = ITF entry
- JE = Junior exempt
- w/o = Walkover
- r = Retired
- d = Defaulted
- SR = Special ranking

=== Finals ===
Semifinals
(Argentina) Marco Trungelliti	2	7	6^{4}
(Argentina) Facundo Bagnis	6	5	7^{7}
5	(Croatia) Antonio Veić	4	3
2	(Netherlands) Thiemo de Bakker	6	6

Final
(Argentina) Facundo Bagnis	7^{7}	7^{7}
2	(Netherlands) Thiemo de Bakker	6^{2}	6^{3}

=== Top half ===
First round
1	(Argentina) M Alund	6	6
Q	(Argentina) A Collarini	3	3
LL	(Brazil) F de Paula	6	6
(Argentina) A Velotti	4	3
(Argentina) M Trungelliti	6^{6}	6	6
WC	(Chile) N Massú	7^{8}	4	3
(Italy) G Naso	2	1
7	(Chile) P Capdeville	6	6
3	(Brazil) R Dutra da Silva	6	6
(Canada) S Diez	4	2
(Argentina) F Bagnis	7^{8}	4	6
(Brazil) M Demoliner	6^{6}	6	3
(Chile) J Aguilar	4	7^{7}	5
(Colombia) A González	6	6^{2}	7
SE	(Argentina) R Olivo	6	3	6
8	(Argentina) DS Schwartzman	3	6	1

Second round
1	(Argentina) M Alund	6	7
LL	(Brazil) F de Paula	2	5
(Argentina) M Trungelliti	6	2	6
7	(Chile) P Capdeville	4	6	3
3	(Brazil) R Dutra da Silva	7	1	1
(Argentina) F Bagnis	5	6	6
(Colombia) A González	6	6
SE	(Argentina) R Olivo	2	2

Quarterfinals
1	(Argentina) M Alund	6^{4}	3
(Argentina) M Trungelliti	7^{7}	6
(Argentina) F Bagnis	6	6
(Colombia) A González	0	3

Semifinals
(Argentina) M Trungelliti	2	7	6^{4}
(Argentina) F Bagnis	6	5	7^{7}

=== Bottom half ===
First round
5	(Croatia) A Veić	7^{8}	6
(United Kingdom) J Ward	6^{6}	1
(Brazil) G Clezar	7	6
(Brazil) R Hocevar	5	3
Q	(Spain) P Riba	6	6
Q	(Slovakia) J Kovalík	3	4
(Argentina) G Andreozzi	1^{r}
4	(Argentina) F Delbonis	4
6	(Brazil) J Souza	6^{4}	4
(Serbia) B Pašanski	7^{7}	6
Q	(Chile) JC Sáez	2	3
WC	(Chile) G Lama	6	6
WC	(Chile) M Sborowitz	3	2
WC	(Chile) C Garín	6	6
(Czech Republic) I Minář	6^{2}	2
2	(Netherlands) T de Bakker	7^{7}	6

Second round
5	(Croatia) A Veić	6	6
(Brazil) G Clezar	1	2
Q	(Spain) P Riba	4	4
4	(Argentina) F Delbonis	6	6
(Serbia) B Pašanski	6	1	4
WC	(Chile) G Lama	3	6	6
WC	(Chile) C Garín	1	2
2	(Netherlands) T de Bakker	6	6

Quarterfinals
5	(Croatia) A Veić	3	6	6
4	(Argentina) F Delbonis	6	4	4
WC	(Chile) G Lama	4	4
2	(Netherlands) T de Bakker	6	6

Semifinals
5	(Croatia) A Veić	4	3
2	(Netherlands) T de Bakker	6	6
