= 2018 Challenger ATP Cachantún Cup =

- Date: 5–10 March
- Edition: 11th
- Draw: 32S / 16D
- Surface: Red clay
- Location: Santiago, Chile

Champions

Singles
- (Italy) Marco Cecchinato

Doubles
- (Monaco) Romain Arneodo / (France) Jonathan Eysseric
← 2017 ·	Challenger ATP Cachantún Cup	· 2019 →

The 2018 Cachantún Open by KIA was a professional tennis tournament played on red clay courts. It was the 11th edition of the tournament which was part of the 2018 ATP Challenger Tour. It took place in Santiago, Chile between 5 and 10 March 2018.

== Singles main-draw entrants ==
=== Seeds ===
Country	Player	Rank^{1}	Seed
POR	Gastão Elias	102	1
ITA	Marco Cecchinato	103	2
BRA	Rogério Dutra Silva	106	3
POR	Pedro Sousa	121	4
SVK	Andrej Martin	124	5
BRA	Thiago Monteiro	125	6
~~ARG~~	~~Carlos Berlocq~~	~~131~~	~~7~~
BRA	Thomaz Bellucci	132	8

- ^{1} Rankings are as of 26 February 2018.

=== Other entrants ===
The following players received wildcards into the singles main draw:

- (Chile) Marcelo Tomás Barrios Vera
- (Chile) Christian Garín
- (Chile) Gonzalo Lama
- (Chile) Alejandro Tabilo

The following player received entry into the singles main draw as an alternate:

- (Serbia) Peđa Krstin

The following players received entry from the qualifying draw:

- (Argentina) Facundo Argüello
- (Argentina) Pedro Cachin
- (Spain) Carlos Gómez-Herrera
- (Italy) Gian Marco Moroni

The following players received entry as lucky losers:

- (Argentina) Hernán Casanova
- (Brazil) João Souza

== Champions ==
=== Singles ===
- (Italy) Marco Cecchinato def. (Spain) Carlos Gómez-Herrera 1–6, 6–1, 6–1.

=== Doubles ===
- (Monaco) Romain Arneodo / (France) Jonathan Eysseric def. (Argentina) Guido Andreozzi / (Argentina) Guillermo Durán 7–6^{(7–4)}, 1–6, [12–10].
