= 2024 Challenger de Santiago – Doubles =

Doubles
- 2024 Challenger de Santiago

Final
- Champions: (Brazil) Fernando Romboli (Brazil) Marcelo Zormann
- Runners-up: (Bolivia) Boris Arias (Bolivia) Federico Zeballos
- Score: 7–6^{(7–5)}, 6–4

Events
| Singles | Doubles |
- Challenger de Santiago

Pedro Boscardin Dias and João Lucas Reis da Silva were the defending champions but lost in the first round to Boris Arias and Federico Zeballos.

Fernando Romboli and Marcelo Zormann won the title after defeating Arias and Zeballos 7–6^{(7–5)}, 6–4 in the final.

== Seeds ==
1. (United States) Evan King / (United States) Reese Stalder (semifinals)
2. (Bolivia) Boris Arias / (Bolivia) Federico Zeballos (final)
3. (Brazil) Fernando Romboli / (Brazil) Marcelo Zormann (champions)
4. (Argentina) Guillermo Durán / (Argentina) Federico Agustín Gómez (withdrew)

== Draw ==
Key

- Q = Qualifier
- WC = Wild card
- LL = Lucky loser
- Alt = Alternate
- ITF = ITF entry
- PR = Protected ranking
- SR = Special ranking
- SE = Special exempt
- JE = Junior exempt
- JR = Junior Accelerator Programme entrant
- CO = College Accelerator Programme entrant
- NG = Next Gen Accelerator Program entrant
- w/o = Walkover
- r = Retired
- d = Defaulted

First round
1 | (United States) E King (United States) R Stalder | 6^{3} | 6 | [10]
(Peru) G Bueno (Peru) I Buse | 7^{7} | 4 | [4]
WC | (United States) Anders Matta (Portugal) G Oliveira | 6^{4} | 3
(Italy) Edoardo Lavagno (Italy) G Mager | 7^{7} | 6
3 | (Brazil) F Romboli (Brazil) M Zormann | 6 | 7^{7}
(Argentina) A Collarini (Argentina) F Mena | 3 | 6^{5}
Alt | (Brazil) M Pucinelli de Almeida (Brazil) Nicolas Zanellato | 6 | 6
(Australia) A Taylor (Argentina) G Villanueva | 1 | 4
WC | (Chile) Nicolás Bruna (Argentina) Juan Bautista Otegui | 2 | 2
(Argentina) RA Burruchaga (Argentina) GA Olivieri | 6 | 6
(Peru) C Huertas del Pino (Argentina) M Kestelboim | 6 | 3 | [10]
Alt | (Canada) L Draxl (Italy) Alexander Weis | 2 | 6 | [5]
(Brazil) O Luz (Chile) M Soto | 4 | 6 | [10]
(Brazil) M Demoliner (Brazil) G Heide | 6 | 3 | [7]
(Brazil) P Boscardin Dias (Brazil) JL Reis da Silva | 4 | 3
2 | (Bolivia) B Arias (Bolivia) F Zeballos | 6 | 6

Quarterfinals
1 | (United States) E King (United States) R Stalder | w/o
(Italy) E Lavagno (Italy) G Mager
3 | (Brazil) F Romboli (Brazil) M Zormann | 6^{1} | 6 | [10]
Alt | (Brazil) M Pucinelli de Almeida (Brazil) N Zanellato | 7^{7} | 2 | [5]
(Argentina) RA Burruchaga (Argentina) GA Olivieri
(Peru) C Huertas del Pino (Argentina) M Kestelboim | w/o
(Brazil) O Luz (Chile) M Soto | 6 | 3 | [7]
2 | (Bolivia) B Arias (Bolivia) F Zeballos | 3 | 6 | [10]

Semifinals
1 | (United States) E King (United States) R Stalder | 7^{7} | 4 | [7]
3 | (Brazil) F Romboli (Brazil) M Zormann | 6^{3} | 6 | [10]
(Peru) C Huertas del Pino (Argentina) M Kestelboim | 5 | 6 | [3]
2 | (Bolivia) B Arias (Bolivia) F Zeballos | 7 | 2 | [10]

Final
3 | (Brazil) F Romboli (Brazil) M Zormann | 7^{7} | 6
2 | (Bolivia) B Arias (Bolivia) F Zeballos | 6^{5} | 4
