= 2024 Challenger de Santiago – Singles =

Singles
- 2024 Challenger de Santiago

Final
- Champion: (Peru) Juan Pablo Varillas
- Runner-up: (Argentina) Facundo Bagnis
- Score: 6–3, 6–2

Events
| Singles | Doubles |
- Challenger de Santiago

Hugo Dellien was the defending champion but lost in the quarterfinals to Facundo Bagnis.

Juan Pablo Varillas won the title after defeating Bagnis 6–3, 6–2 in the final.

== Seeds ==
1. (Chile) Tomás Barrios Vera (first round)
2. (Peru) Juan Pablo Varillas (champion)
3. (Argentina) Camilo Ugo Carabelli (quarterfinals)
4. (Argentina) Facundo Bagnis (final)
5. (Argentina) Román Andrés Burruchaga (first round)
6. (Argentina) Juan Manuel Cerúndolo (second round)
7. (Bolivia) Hugo Dellien (quarterfinals)
8. (Argentina) Genaro Alberto Olivieri (second round)

== Draw ==
Key

- Q = Qualifier
- WC = Wild card
- LL = Lucky loser
- Alt = Alternate
- ITF = ITF entry
- PR = Protected ranking
- SR = Special ranking
- SE = Special exempt
- JE = Junior exempt
- JR = Junior Accelerator Programme entrant
- CO = College Accelerator Programme entrant
- NG = Next Gen Accelerator Program entrant
- w/o = Walkover
- r = Retired
- d = Defaulted

=== Finals ===
Semifinals
(Brazil) Gustavo Heide | 4 | 6^{1}
4 | (Argentina) Facundo Bagnis | 6 | 7^{7}
(Canada) Liam Draxl | 3 | 2
2 | (Peru) Juan Pablo Varillas | 6 | 6

Final
4 | (Argentina) Facundo Bagnis | 3 | 2
2 | (Peru) Juan Pablo Varillas | 6 | 6

=== Top half ===
First round
1 | (Chile) T Barrios Vera | 3 | 4
(Brazil) G Heide | 6 | 6
(Italy) Edoardo Lavagno | 3 | 1
(Argentina) A Collarini | 6 | 6
Q | (Argentina) V Aboian | 6 | 6
Alt | (Brazil) M Pucinelli de Almeida | 4 | 4
(Italy) G Mager | 3 | 6 | 6
5 | (Argentina) RA Burruchaga | 6 | 3 | 3
4 | (Argentina) F Bagnis | 6 | 7
Q | (South Korea) G Campaña Lee | 1 | 5
Q | (Romania) GA Boitan | 6 | 6
Q | (Argentina) M Kestelboim | 4 | 4
WC | (Brazil) J Fonseca | 6^{2} | 6 | 4
Q | (Argentina) FA Gómez | 7^{7} | 2 | 6
(Peru) G Bueno | 4 | 6^{4}
7 | (Bolivia) H Dellien | 6 | 7^{7}

Second round
(Brazil) G Heide | 7 | 6
(Argentina) A Collarini | 5 | 1
Q | (Argentina) V Aboian | 7 | 1 | 2
(Italy) G Mager | 5 | 6 | 6
4 | (Argentina) F Bagnis | 6 | 6
Q | (Romania) GA Boitan | 4 | 2
Q | (Argentina) FA Gómez | 6 | 1 | 0
7 | (Bolivia) H Dellien | 3 | 6 | 6

Quarterfinals
(Brazil) G Heide | 6 | 7^{7}
(Italy) G Mager | 2 | 6^{5}
4 | (Argentina) F Bagnis | 6 | 7^{10}
7 | (Bolivia) H Dellien | 3 | 6^{8}

Semifinals
(Brazil) G Heide | 4 | 6^{1}
4 | (Argentina) F Bagnis | 6 | 7^{7}

=== Bottom half ===
First round
8 | (Argentina) GA Olivieri | 2 | 7 | 6
(Portugal) G Oliveira | 6 | 5 | 2
(Canada) L Draxl | 6^{7} | 6 | 7^{7}
(Australia) P Sekulic | 7^{9} | 4 | 6^{2}
(Italy) Alexander Weis | 6 | 4 | 2
WC | (Peru) I Buse | 4 | 6 | 6
WC | (Chile) M Soto | 6 | 4 | 3
3 | (Argentina) C Ugo Carabelli | 4 | 6 | 6
6 | (Argentina) JM Cerúndolo | 6 | 6
(Brazil) JL Reis da Silva | 1 | 0
(Italy) F Passaro | 6 | 6
(Bolivia) M Dellien | 0 | 4
Q | (Brazil) O Luz | 6 | 2
(Argentina) R Olivo | 3 | 1^{d}
PR | (United Kingdom) P Jubb | 6 | 3 | 6^{6}
2 | (Peru) JP Varillas | 3 | 6 | 7^{8}

Second round
8 | (Argentina) GA Olivieri | 1 | 6 | 1
(Canada) L Draxl | 6 | 4 | 6
WC | (Peru) I Buse | 6^{9} | 4
3 | (Argentina) C Ugo Carabelli | 7^{11} | 6
6 | (Argentina) JM Cerúndolo | 1 | 5
(Italy) F Passaro | 6 | 7
Q | (Brazil) O Luz | 3 | 6 | 6^{3}
2 | (Peru) JP Varillas | 6 | 2 | 7^{7}

Quarterfinals
(Canada) L Draxl | 6 | 5 | 7
3 | (Argentina) C Ugo Carabelli | 4 | 7 | 5
(Italy) F Passaro | 5 | 6 | 6^{6}
2 | (Peru) JP Varillas | 7 | 4 | 7^{8}

Semifinals
(Canada) L Draxl | 3 | 2
2 | (Peru) JP Varillas | 6 | 6
