= 2014 Challenger ATP Cachantún Cup – Singles =

Singles
- 2014 Challenger ATP Cachantún Cup

Final
- Champion: (Netherlands) Thiemo de Bakker
- Runner-up: (Australia) James Duckworth
- Score: 4–6, 7–6^{(12–10)}, 6–1

Events
Singles	Doubles
← 2013 ·	Challenger ATP Cachantún Cup	· 2015 →

Facundo Bagnis was not the defending his title.

Thiemo de Bakker won the title, defeating James Duckworth in the final, 4–6, 7–6^{(12–10)}, 6–1.

== Seeds ==
1. (United States) Denis Kudla (second round)
2. (Argentina) Facundo Argüello (quarterfinals)
3. (Argentina) Guido Andreozzi (first round)
4. (United States) Wayne Odesnik (quarterfinals)
5. (Australia) James Duckworth (final)
6. (France) Lucas Pouille (first round)
7. (Argentina) Renzo Olivo (first round)
8. (Argentina) Andrea Collarini (second round)

== Draw ==
=== Key ===
- Q = Qualifier
- WC = Wild card
- LL = Lucky loser
- Alt = Alternate
- ITF = ITF entry
- PR = Protected ranking
- SR = Special ranking
- SE = Special exempt
- JE = Junior exempt
- JR = Junior Accelerator Programme entrant
- CO = College Accelerator Programme entrant
- NG = Next Gen Accelerator Program entrant
- w/o = Walkover
- r = Retired
- d = Defaulted

=== Finals ===
Semifinals
(Chile) Hans Podlipnik	4^{r}
5	(Australia) James Duckworth	4
(Republic of Ireland) Louk Sorensen	3	3
Q	(Netherlands) Thiemo de Bakker	6	6

Final
5	(Australia) James Duckworth	6	6^{10}	1
Q	(Netherlands) Thiemo de Bakker	4	7^{12}	6

=== Top half ===
First round
1	(United States) D Kudla	6	6
(Brazil) Wilson Leite	3	2
(Bolivia) H Dellien	6^{8}	1
(Chile) H Podlipnik	7^{10}	6
(Chile) C Garin	6^{4}	2
Q	(Argentina) P Cachin	7^{7}	6
(Argentina) E Schwank	5	6	6
7	(Argentina) R Olivo	7	2	2
3	(Argentina) G Andreozzi	6	5	2
(Argentina) F Coria	3	7	6
(Dominican Republic) J Hernández	7	7^{7}
Q	(Chile) J Aguilar	5	6^{5}
WC	(Chile) Guillermo Núñez	1	0
(Chile) P Capdeville	6	6
(Chile) G Lama	4	4
5	(Australia) J Duckworth	6	6

Second round
1	(United States) D Kudla	7^{13}	3	2
(Chile) H Podlipnik	6^{11}	6	6
Q	(Argentina) P Cachin	2	6^{1}
(Argentina) E Schwank	6	7^{7}
(Argentina) F Coria	7^{7}	4	6
(Dominican Republic) J Hernández	6^{3}	6	4
(Chile) P Capdeville	7^{7}	3	4
5	(Australia) J Duckworth	6^{5}	6	6

Quarterfinals
(Chile) H Podlipnik	5	7	6
(Argentina) E Schwank	7	5	3
(Argentina) F Coria	1	4
5	(Australia) J Duckworth	6	6

Semifinals
(Chile) H Podlipnik	4^{r}
5	(Australia) J Duckworth	4

=== Bottom half ===
First round
6	(France) L Pouille	0	4
(Republic of Ireland) L Sorensen	6	6
(Ecuador) G Lapentti	4	6^{0}
(Austria) D Novak	6	7^{7}
WC	(Chile) M Sborowitz	3	6^{8}
(Ecuador) E Gómez	6	7^{10}
(Argentina) M Trungelliti	4	6	6^{5}
4	(United States) W Odesnik	6	4	7^{7}
8	(Argentina) A Collarini	6	6
(Belgium) Y Reuter	2	2
WC	(Chile) Bastián Malla	3	3
Q	(Netherlands) T de Bakker	6	6
(Italy) G Quinzi	6	6
WC	(Chile) N Jarry	4	4
Q	(Argentina) JP Paz	5	2
2	(Argentina) F Argüello	7	6

Second round
(Republic of Ireland) L Sorensen	6	6
(Austria) D Novak	2	4
(Ecuador) E Gómez	6	2	6^{5}
4	(United States) W Odesnik	4	6	7^{7}
8	(Argentina) A Collarini	6	1	6^{7}
Q	(Netherlands) T de Bakker	3	6	7^{9}
(Italy) G Quinzi	5	1
2	(Argentina) F Argüello	7	6

Quarterfinals
(Republic of Ireland) L Sorensen	6	6
4	(United States) W Odesnik	4	2
Q	(Netherlands) T de Bakker	2	6	6
2	(Argentina) F Argüello	6	3	3

Semifinals
(Republic of Ireland) L Sorensen	3	3
Q	(Netherlands) T de Bakker	6	6
