= 2026 Challenger de Santiago – Singles =

Singles
- 2026 Challenger de Santiago

Final
- Champion: (Argentina) Genaro Alberto Olivieri
- Runner-up: (Portugal) Henrique Rocha
- Score: 6–4, 6–4

Events
Singles	Doubles
- Challenger de Santiago

Daniel Elahi Galán was the defending champion but lost in the first round to Diego Dedura.

Genaro Alberto Olivieri won the title after defeating Henrique Rocha 6–4, 6–4 in the final.

== Seeds ==
1. (Paraguay) Daniel Vallejo (quarterfinals)
2. (Netherlands) Guy den Ouden (withdrew)
3. (Portugal) Jaime Faria (first round)
4. (Portugal) Henrique Rocha (final)
5. (Argentina) Alex Barrena (first round, retired)
6. (Colombia) Daniel Elahi Galán (first round)
7. (Argentina) Juan Pablo Ficovich (first round)
8. (Brazil) João Lucas Reis da Silva (second round)

== Draw ==
Key

- Q = Qualifier
- WC = Wild card
- LL = Lucky loser
- Alt = Alternate
- ITF = ITF entry
- PR = Protected ranking
- SR = Special ranking
- SE = Special exempt
- JE = Junior exempt
- JR = Junior Accelerator Programme entrant
- CO = College Accelerator Programme entrant
- NG = Next Gen Accelerator Program entrant
- w/o = Walkover
- r = Retired
- d = Defaulted

=== Finals ===
Semifinals
(Brazil) Thiago Monteiro	6	4	5
(Argentina) Genaro Alberto Olivieri	3	6	7
4	(Portugal) Henrique Rocha	6	6
(Brazil) Pedro Boscardin Dias	1	2

Final
(Argentina) Genaro Alberto Olivieri	6	6
4	(Portugal) Henrique Rocha	4	4

=== Top half ===
First round
1	(Paraguay) AD Vallejo	6	6
Q	(Argentina) G Villanueva	3	4
(Brazil) F Meligeni Alves	5	6	6
Q	(Chile) Benjamín Torrealba	7	1	3
(Italy) G Cadenasso	6	3	2
(Brazil) T Monteiro	3	6	6
WC	(Germany) D Dedura	6	7
6	(Colombia) DE Galán	4	5
3	(Portugal) J Faria	7^{7}	4	5
Q	(Brazil) I Marcondes	6^{3}	6	7
Q	(United States) N Moreno de Alboran	7	6
(Chile) M Soto	5	3
(Argentina) GA Olivieri	3	6	4
(Brazil) G Heide	6	3	0^{r}
(Argentina) A Collarini	6	5
5	(Argentina) A Barrena	0	2^{r}

Second round
1	(Paraguay) AD Vallejo	6	3	6
(Brazil) F Meligeni Alves	4	6	3
(Brazil) T Monteiro	7^{9}	6
WC	(Germany) D Dedura	6^{7}	3
Q	(Brazil) I Marcondes	7	3	4
Q	(United States) N Moreno de Alboran	5	6	6
(Argentina) GA Olivieri	6	4	7^{7}
(Argentina) A Collarini	1	6	6^{5}

Quarterfinals
1	(Paraguay) AD Vallejo	6	3	4
(Brazil) T Monteiro	3	6	6
Q	(United States) N Moreno de Alboran	4	5
(Argentina) GA Olivieri	6	7

Semifinals
(Brazil) T Monteiro	6	4	5
(Argentina) GA Olivieri	3	6	7

=== Bottom half ===
First round
7	(Argentina) JP Ficovich	4	2
Alt	(Argentina) F Mena	6	6
(Spain) N Sánchez Izquierdo	6	7
Q	(United States) C Kingsley	4	5
(Argentina) S Rodríguez Taverna	7^{7}	6
WC	(Chile) Bastián Malla	6^{5}	3
Q	(Brazil) P Sakamoto	6	3	3
4	(Portugal) H Rocha	2	6	6
8	(Brazil) JL Reis da Silva	3	6	7
Alt	(Brazil) D Dutra da Silva	6	4	5
WC	(Chile) Amador Salazar	1	3
(Brazil) P Boscardin Dias	6	6
(Peru) JP Varillas	0	5
(Peru) G Bueno	6	7
(Italy) F Agamenone	6	6^{5}	6
LL	(Argentina) GI Justo	1	7^{7}	1

Second round
Alt	(Argentina) F Mena	6^{3}	4
(Spain) N Sánchez Izquierdo	7^{7}	6
(Argentina) S Rodríguez Taverna	5	0^{r}
4	(Portugal) H Rocha	7	4
8	(Brazil) JL Reis da Silva	1	6	4
(Brazil) P Boscardin Dias	6	3	6
(Peru) G Bueno	6	6
(Italy) F Agamenone	3	3

Quarterfinals
(Spain) N Sánchez Izquierdo	6^{2}	6	3
4	(Portugal) H Rocha	7^{7}	3	6
(Brazil) P Boscardin Dias	7^{7}	6
(Peru) G Bueno	6^{5}	2

Semifinals
4	(Portugal) H Rocha	6	6
(Brazil) P Boscardin Dias	1	2
