= 2026 Challenger de Santiago – Doubles =

Doubles
- 2026 Challenger de Santiago

Final
- Champions: (Italy) Gianluca Cadenasso (Brazil) Paulo André Saraiva dos Santos
- Runners-up: (Mexico) Miguel Ángel Reyes-Varela (Bolivia) Federico Zeballos
- Score: 6–3, 7–5

Events
Singles	Doubles
- Challenger de Santiago

Vasil Kirkov and Matías Soto were the defending champions but only Soto chose to defend his title, partnering Felipe Meligeni Alves. They lost in the first round to Gianluca Cadenasso and Paulo André Saraiva dos Santos.

Cadenasso and Saraiva dos Santos won the title after defeating Miguel Ángel Reyes-Varela and Federico Zeballos 6–3, 7–5 in the final.

== Seeds ==
1. (Mexico) Miguel Ángel Reyes-Varela / (Bolivia) Federico Zeballos (final)
2. (Ecuador) Gonzalo Escobar / (Croatia) Nino Serdarušić (quarterfinals)
3. (Argentina) Mariano Kestelboim / (Brazil) Marcelo Zormann (quarterfinals)
4. (Uruguay) Ignacio Carou / (Argentina) Facundo Mena (quarterfinals)

== Draw ==
Key

- Q = Qualifier
- WC = Wild card
- LL = Lucky loser
- Alt = Alternate
- ITF = ITF entry
- PR = Protected ranking
- SR = Special ranking
- SE = Special exempt
- JE = Junior exempt
- JR = Junior Accelerator Programme entrant
- CO = College Accelerator Programme entrant
- NG = Next Gen Accelerator Program entrant
- w/o = Walkover
- r = Retired
- d = Defaulted

First round
1	(Mexico) M Reyes-Varela (Bolivia) F Zeballos	1	2
(Portugal) J Faria (Portugal) H Rocha	6	5^{r}
WC	(United States) Milledge Cossu (Chile) Bastián Malla	6^{4}	2
(Spain) N Sánchez Izquierdo (Argentina) G Villanueva	7^{7}	6
4	(Uruguay) I Carou (Argentina) F Mena	7^{8}	6
(Argentina) Valentín Basel (Brazil) I Marcondes	6^{6}	4
(Bolivia) B Arias (Brazil) D Dutra da Silva	6	6
(Brazil) L Britto (Brazil) Bruno Oliveira	3	3
(Brazil) F Meligeni Alves (Chile) M Soto	6	3	[7]
(Italy) G Cadenasso (Brazil) PA Saraiva dos Santos	2	6	[10]
WC	(Chile) D Jarry Fillol (Chile) Anders Matta	4	4
3	(Argentina) M Kestelboim (Brazil) M Zormann	6	6
Alt	(Argentina) S Rodríguez Taverna (Brazil) Gabriel Roveri Sidney	6^{4}	6^{8}
Alt	(Chile) Ignacio Becerra (Chile) Daniel Antonio Núñez	7^{7}	7^{10}
(Peru) A Huertas del Pino (Peru) C Huertas del Pino	5	7	[9]
2	(Ecuador) G Escobar (Croatia) N Serdarušić	7	5	[11]

Quarterfinals
1	(Mexico) M Reyes-Varela (Bolivia) F Zeballos	6	4	[10]
(Spain) N Sánchez Izquierdo (Argentina) G Villanueva	3	6	[7]
4	(Uruguay) I Carou (Argentina) F Mena	1	2
(Bolivia) B Arias (Brazil) D Dutra da Silva	6	6
(Italy) G Cadenasso (Brazil) PA Saraiva dos Santos	6	6
3	(Argentina) M Kestelboim (Brazil) M Zormann	3	4
Alt	(Chile) I Becerra (Chile) DA Núñez	7	2	[10]
2	(Ecuador) G Escobar (Croatia) N Serdarušić	5	6	[7]

Semifinals
1	(Mexico) M Reyes-Varela (Bolivia) F Zeballos	3	7^{7}	[10]
(Bolivia) B Arias (Brazil) D Dutra da Silva	6	6^{1}	[6]
(Italy) G Cadenasso (Brazil) PA Saraiva dos Santos	6	6
Alt	(Chile) I Becerra (Chile) DA Núñez	3	2

Final
1	(Mexico) M Reyes-Varela (Bolivia) F Zeballos	3	5
(Italy) G Cadenasso (Brazil) PA Saraiva dos Santos	6	7
