= 2013 Cachantún Cup – Doubles =

Doubles
- 2013 Cachantún Cup

Final
- Champions: (Brazil) Marcelo Demoliner (Brazil) João Souza
- Runners-up: (Argentina) Federico Delbonis (Argentina) Diego Junqueira
- Score: 7–5, 6–1

Events
Singles	Doubles
← 2012 ·	Cachantún Cup	· 2014 →

Paul Capdeville and Marcel Felder were the defending champions, but they lost in the quarterfinals to Federico Delbonis and Diego Junqueira.
Marcelo Demoliner and João Souza defeated Delbonis and Junqueira 7–5, 6–1 in the final to win the title.

== Seeds ==
1. (Brazil) Marcelo Demoliner / (Brazil) João Souza (champions)
2. (Australia) Jordan Kerr / (Sweden) Andreas Siljeström (first round)
3. (Argentina) Martín Alund / (Argentina) Facundo Bagnis (semifinals)
4. (Chile) Paul Capdeville / (Uruguay) Marcel Felder (quarterfinals)

== Draw ==
=== Key ===
- Q = Qualifier
- WC = Wild card
- LL = Lucky loser
- Alt = Alternate
- SE = Special exempt
- PR = Protected ranking
- ITF = ITF entry
- JE = Junior exempt
- w/o = Walkover
- r = Retired
- d = Defaulted
- SR = Special ranking

=== Draw ===
First round
1	(Brazil) M Demoliner (Brazil) J Souza	6	6
(Brazil) F de Paula (Colombia) A González	3	4
(Serbia) B Pašanski (Croatia) A Veić	2	6	[10]
(Uruguay) A Behar (Argentina) A Velotti	6	4	[6]
3	(Argentina) M Alund (Argentina) F Bagnis	w/o
(Peru) D Beretta (Ecuador) JC Campozano
(Brazil) G Clezar (Brazil) R Hocevar	6^{8}	4
WC	(Chile) H Podlipnik (Chile) JC Sáez	7^{10}	6
(Argentina) F Delbonis (Argentina) D Junqueira	6	6
(Argentina) R Olivo (Argentina) DS Schwartzman	1	4
WC	(Chile) J Aguilar (Chile) N Massú
4	(Chile) P Capdeville (Uruguay) M Felder	w/o
(Argentina) A Collarini (Argentina) A Molteni	w/o
(Netherlands) T de Bakker (United Kingdom) J Ward
WC	(Chile) C Garín (Chile) G Lama	7^{7}	6
2	(Australia) J Kerr (Sweden) A Siljeström	6^{4}	4

Quarterfinals
1	(Brazil) M Demoliner (Brazil) J Souza	6	6
(Serbia) B Pašanski (Croatia) A Veić	4	3
3	(Argentina) M Alund (Argentina) F Bagnis	6	6
WC	(Chile) H Podlipnik (Chile) JC Sáez	4	2
(Argentina) F Delbonis (Argentina) D Junqueira	6	6
4	(Chile) P Capdeville (Uruguay) M Felder	2	4
(Argentina) A Collarini (Argentina) A Molteni	4	7^{7}	[11]
WC	(Chile) C Garín (Chile) G Lama	6	6^{3}	[9]

Semifinals
1	(Brazil) M Demoliner (Brazil) J Souza	6	7
3	(Argentina) M Alund (Argentina) F Bagnis	4	5
(Argentina) F Delbonis (Argentina) D Junqueira	7	6
(Argentina) A Collarini (Argentina) A Molteni	5	3

Final
1	(Brazil) M Demoliner (Brazil) J Souza	7	6
(Argentina) F Delbonis (Argentina) D Junqueira	5	1
