= 2017 Challenger ATP Cachantún Cup – Doubles =

Doubles
- 2017 Challenger ATP Cachantún Cup

Final
- Champions: (Chile) Marcelo Tomás Barrios Vera (Chile) Nicolás Jarry
- Runners-up: (Argentina) Máximo González (Argentina) Andrés Molteni
- Score: 6–4, 6–3

Events
Singles	Doubles
← 2016 ·	Challenger ATP Cachantún Cup	· 2018 →

Julio Peralta and Hans Podlipnik-Castillo were the defending champions but chose to defend their title with different partners. Peralta partnered Íñigo Cervantes but lost in the first round to Fabiano de Paula and Fabrício Neis. Podlipnik-Castillo partnered Max Schnur but lost in the first round to Marcelo Tomás Barrios Vera and Nicolás Jarry.

Barrios Vera and Jarry won the title after defeating Máximo González and Andrés Molteni 6–4, 6–3 in the final.

== Seeds ==
1. (Argentina) Máximo González / (Argentina) Andrés Molteni (final)
2. (Chile) Hans Podlipnik-Castillo / (United States) Max Schnur (first round)
3. (Spain) Íñigo Cervantes / (Chile) Julio Peralta (first round)
4. (Peru) Sergio Galdós / (Brazil) Caio Zampieri (quarterfinals)

== Draw ==
=== Key ===
- Q = Qualifier
- WC = Wild card
- LL = Lucky loser
- Alt = Alternate
- SE = Special exempt
- PR = Protected ranking
- ITF = ITF entry
- JE = Junior exempt
- w/o = Walkover
- r = Retired
- d = Defaulted
- SR = Special ranking

First round
1	(Argentina) M González (Argentina) A Molteni	6	6
(Japan) T Daniel (Spain) R Ramírez Hidalgo	2	4
(Argentina) F Argüello (Argentina) F Coria	4	5
(Chile) C Garin (Dominican Republic) J Hernández-Fernández	6	7
3	(Spain) Í Cervantes (Chile) J Peralta	2	4
(Brazil) F de Paula (Brazil) F Neis	6	6
WC	(Ecuador) E Gómez (Argentina) JI Londero	7^{7}	7^{7}
(France) M Bourgue (France) M Janvier	6^{4}	6^{5}
WC	(Brazil) O Luz (Brazil) M Zormann	1
(Brazil) D Dutra da Silva (Brazil) B Sant'Anna	3^{r}
(Uruguay) M Felder (France) T Lamasine	3	6^{8}
4	(Peru) S Galdós (Brazil) C Zampieri	6	7^{10}
(Brazil) R Dutra Silva (Brazil) E Russi Assumpção	3	1
(Argentina) G Andreozzi (Brazil) J Souza	6	6
WC	(Chile) MT Barrios Vera (Chile) N Jarry	6^{4}	7^{11}	[10]
2	(Chile) H Podlipnik-Castillo (United States) M Schnur	7^{7}	6^{9}	[3]

Quarterfinals
1	(Argentina) M González (Argentina) A Molteni	6	6
(Chile) C Garin (Dominican Republic) J Hernández-Fernández	2	4
(Brazil) F de Paula (Brazil) F Neis	4	2
WC	(Ecuador) E Gómez (Argentina) JI Londero	6	6
WC	(Brazil) O Luz (Brazil) M Zormann	7	7
4	(Peru) S Galdós (Brazil) C Zampieri	5	5
(Argentina) G Andreozzi (Brazil) J Souza
WC	(Chile) MT Barrios Vera (Chile) N Jarry	w/o

Semifinals
1	(Argentina) M González (Argentina) A Molteni	4	7	[10]
WC	(Ecuador) E Gómez (Argentina) JI Londero	6	5	[7]
WC	(Brazil) O Luz (Brazil) M Zormann	7^{8}	5	[7]
WC	(Chile) MT Barrios Vera (Chile) N Jarry	6^{6}	7	[10]

Final
1	(Argentina) M González (Argentina) A Molteni	4	3
WC	(Chile) MT Barrios Vera (Chile) N Jarry	6	6
