= 2009 Challenger de Providencia =

- Date: March 9 – March 15
- Edition: 5th
- Location: Providencia, Chile

Champions

Singles
- (Argentina) Máximo González

Doubles
- (Argentina) Horacio Zeballos / (Argentina) Sebastián Prieto
- Cachantún Cup (ATP)

The 2009 Challenger de Providencia was a professional tennis tournament played on outdoor red clay courts. It was part of the 2009 ATP Challenger Tour. It took place in Providencia, Chile between 9 and 15 March 2009.

== Singles entrants ==
=== Seeds ===
Nationality	Player	Ranking*	Seeding
ARG	Leonardo Mayer	95	1
ARG	Máximo González	99	2
ARG	Sergio Roitman	105	3
ARG	Horacio Zeballos	149	4
BRA	Franco Ferreiro	170	5
BRA	Ricardo Hocevar	171	6
ARG	Sebastián Decoud	183	7
ARG	Mariano Puerta	187	8

- Rankings are as of March 2, 2009.

=== Other entrants ===
The following players received wildcards into the singles main draw:

- (Argentina) Gastón Gaudio
- (Chile) Guillermo Hormazábal
- (Chile) Hans Podlipnik-Castillo
- (Chile) Guillermo Rivera Aránguiz

The following players received entry from the qualifying draw:

- (Chile) Jorge Aguilar
- (Italy) Luigi D'Agord
- (Argentina) Alejandro Kon
- (Brazil) Flávio Saretta
- (Argentina) Alejandro Fabbri (as a Lucky loser)
- (Argentina) Gonzalo Tur (as a Lucky loser)

== Champions ==
=== Men's singles ===
(Argentina) Máximo González def. (Argentina) Mariano Zabaleta, 6–4, 6–3

=== Men's doubles ===
(Argentina) Horacio Zeballos / (Argentina) Sebastián Prieto def. (Brazil) Flávio Saretta / (Brazil) Rogério Dutra da Silva, 7–6(2), 6–2
