= 2018 Challenger ATP Cachantún Cup – Singles =

Singles
- 2018 Challenger ATP Cachantún Cup

Final
- Champion: (Italy) Marco Cecchinato
- Runner-up: (Spain) Carlos Gómez-Herrera
- Score: 1–6, 6–1, 6–1

Events
Singles	Doubles
- Challenger ATP Cachantún Cup

Rogério Dutra Silva was the defending champion but lost in the quarterfinals to Carlos Gómez-Herrera.

Marco Cecchinato won the title after defeating Gómez-Herrera 1–6, 6–1, 6–1 in the final.

== Seeds ==
1. (Portugal) Gastão Elias (second round)
2. (Italy) Marco Cecchinato (champion)
3. (Brazil) Rogério Dutra Silva (quarterfinals)
4. (Portugal) Pedro Sousa (first round)
5. (Slovakia) Andrej Martin (first round)
6. (Brazil) Thiago Monteiro (first round)
7. (Argentina) Carlos Berlocq (withdrew)
8. (Brazil) Thomaz Bellucci (quarterfinals)

== Draw ==
Key

- Q = Qualifier
- WC = Wild card
- LL = Lucky loser
- Alt = Alternate
- ITF = ITF entry
- PR = Protected ranking
- SR = Special ranking
- SE = Special exempt
- JE = Junior exempt
- JR = Junior Accelerator Programme entrant
- CO = College Accelerator Programme entrant
- NG = Next Gen Accelerator Program entrant
- w/o = Walkover
- r = Retired
- d = Defaulted

=== Finals ===
Semifinals
(Slovakia) Jozef Kovalík	3	6^{1}
Q	(Spain) Carlos Gómez-Herrera	6	7^{7}
(Spain) Tommy Robredo	6	1	4
2	(Italy) Marco Cecchinato	4	6	6

Final
Q	(Spain) Carlos Gómez-Herrera	6	1	1
2	(Italy) Marco Cecchinato	1	6	6

=== Top half ===
First round
1	(Portugal) G Elias	7^{7}	6
WC	(Chile) MT Barrios Vera	6^{5}	4
(Slovakia) J Kovalík	6	2	6
(Italy) A Giannessi	3	6	2
(Spain) E López Pérez	6	3	5
(Argentina) R Olivo	3	6	7
Q	(Argentina) F Argüello	2	3
8	(Brazil) T Bellucci	6	6
3	(Brazil) R Dutra Silva	7^{7}	6
(Portugal) J Domingues	6^{2}	4
LL	(Argentina) H Casanova	7	3	6
WC	(Chile) A Tabilo	5	6	4
(Argentina) F Bagnis	7^{7}	6
(France) C Moutet	6^{1}	1
LL	(Brazil) J Souza	3	1
Q	(Spain) C Gómez-Herrera	6	6

Second round
1	(Portugal) G Elias	6^{4}	2
(Slovakia) J Kovalík	7^{7}	6
(Argentina) R Olivo	1	4
8	(Brazil) T Bellucci	6	6
3	(Brazil) R Dutra Silva	6	6
LL	(Argentina) H Casanova	3	4
(Argentina) F Bagnis	1	3
Q	(Spain) C Gómez-Herrera	6	6

Quarterfinals
(Slovakia) J Kovalík	6^{6}	7^{7}	6
8	(Brazil) T Bellucci	7^{8}	6^{4}	3
3	(Brazil) R Dutra Silva	6	3	3
Q	(Spain) C Gómez-Herrera	4	6	6

Semifinals
(Slovakia) J Kovalík	3	6^{1}
Q	(Spain) C Gómez-Herrera	6	7^{7}

=== Bottom half ===
First round
6	(Brazil) T Monteiro	2	3
Q	(Italy) GM Moroni	6	6
(Austria) S Ofner	6	2	6
WC	(Chile) G Lama	4	6	4
(France) M Bourgue	4	6	2
WC	(Chile) C Garín	6	4	6
(Spain) T Robredo	6	7
4	(Portugal) P Sousa	4	5
5	(Slovakia) A Martin	4	0
(Argentina) G Andreozzi	6	6
Alt	(Serbia) P Krstin	6	3	6
(Belgium) A De Greef	3	6	0
(Spain) C Taberner	6	7
Q	(Argentina) P Cachin	4	5
(Italy) S Bolelli	3	5
2	(Italy) M Cecchinato	6	7

Second round
Q	(Italy) GM Moroni	6	6
(Austria) S Ofner	2	1
WC	(Chile) C Garín	3	6	1
(Spain) T Robredo	6	4	6
(Argentina) G Andreozzi	6	6
Alt	(Serbia) P Krstin	3	4
(Spain) C Taberner	3	6	4
2	(Italy) M Cecchinato	6	2	6

Quarterfinals
Q	(Italy) GM Moroni	7^{8}	3	0
(Spain) T Robredo	6^{6}	6	6
(Argentina) G Andreozzi	1	2
2	(Italy) M Cecchinato	6	6

Semifinals
(Spain) T Robredo	6	1	4
2	(Italy) M Cecchinato	4	6	6
