= 2024 Challenger de Santiago =

- Date: 11–17 March
- Edition: 18th
- Surface: Clay
- Location: Santiago, Chile

Champions

Singles
- (Peru) Juan Pablo Varillas

Doubles
- (Brazil) Fernando Romboli / (Brazil) Marcelo Zormann
- Challenger de Santiago

The 2024 Challenger de Santiago was a professional tennis tournament played on clay courts. It was the 18th edition of the tournament which was part of the 2024 ATP Challenger Tour. It took place in Santiago, Chile between 11 and 17 March 2024.

== Singles main-draw entrants ==
=== Seeds ===
Country	Player	Rank^{1}	Seed
CHI	Tomás Barrios Vera	103	1
PER	Juan Pablo Varillas	110	2
ARG	Camilo Ugo Carabelli	127	3
ARG	Facundo Bagnis	147	4
ARG	Román Andrés Burruchaga	159	5
ARG	Juan Manuel Cerúndolo	160	6
BOL	Hugo Dellien	161	7
ARG	Genaro Alberto Olivieri	177	8

- ^{1} Rankings are as of 4 March 2024.

=== Other entrants ===
The following players received wildcards into the singles main draw:

- (Peru) Ignacio Buse
- (Brazil) João Fonseca
- (Chile) Matías Soto

The following player received entry into the singles main draw using a protected ranking:

- (United Kingdom) Paul Jubb

The following player received entry into the singles main draw as an alternate:

- (Brazil) Matheus Pucinelli de Almeida

The following players received entry from the qualifying draw:

- (Argentina) Valerio Aboian
- (Romania) Gabi Adrian Boitan
- (South Korea) Gerard Campaña Lee
- (Argentina) Federico Agustín Gómez
- (Argentina) Mariano Kestelboim
- (Brazil) Orlando Luz

== Champions ==
=== Singles ===
- (Peru) Juan Pablo Varillas def. (Argentina) Facundo Bagnis 6–3, 6–2.

=== Doubles ===
- (Brazil) Fernando Romboli / (Brazil) Marcelo Zormann def. (Bolivia) Boris Arias / (Bolivia) Federico Zeballos 7–6^{(7–5)}, 6–4.
