= 2019 Challenger ATP Cachantún Cup =

- Date: 4–10 March
- Edition: 12th
- Surface: Clay
- Location: Santiago, Chile

Champions

Singles
- (Bolivia) Hugo Dellien

Doubles
- (Argentina) Franco Agamenone / (Brazil) Fernando Romboli
← 2018 ·	Challenger ATP Cachantún Cup	· 2021 →

The 2019 Cachantún Open by KIA was a professional tennis tournament played on red clay courts. It was the 12th edition of the tournament which was part of the 2019 ATP Challenger Tour. It took place in Santiago, Chile between 4 and 10 March 2019.

== Singles main-draw entrants ==
=== Seeds ===
Country	Player	Rank^{1}	Seed
ESP	Pablo Andújar	91	1
BOL	Hugo Dellien	95	2
BRA	Thiago Monteiro	120	3
BRA	Rogério Dutra Silva	139	4
ARG	Facundo Bagnis	146	5
ITA	Alessandro Giannessi	168	6
ESP	Pedro Martínez	170	7
ESP	Daniel Gimeno Traver	190	8
ARG	Facundo Argüello	192	9
BEL	Kimmer Coppejans	198	10
ITA	Matteo Donati	208	11
POR	João Domingues	212	12
ITA	Gian Marco Moroni	224	13
ITA	Federico Gaio	229	14
BRA	Thomaz Bellucci	235	15
SVK	Andrej Martin	257	16

- ^{1} Rankings are as of 25 February 2019.

=== Other entrants ===
The following players received wildcards into the singles main draw:

- (Spain) Pablo Andújar
- (Chile) Gonzalo Lama
- (Chile) Bastián Malla
- (Chile) Víctor Núñez
- (Chile) Alejandro Tabilo

The following player received entry into the singles main draw using a protected ranking:

- (Argentina) Facundo Mena

The following players received entry into the singles main draw using their ITF World Tennis Ranking:

- (Argentina) Matías Franco Descotte
- (Brazil) João Menezes
- (Brazil) João Souza
- (Argentina) Camilo Ugo Carabelli

The following players received entry from the qualifying draw:

- (Argentina) Francisco Cerúndolo
- (Argentina) Gonzalo Villanueva

== Champions ==
=== Singles ===
- (Bolivia) Hugo Dellien def. (Chinese Taipei) Wu Tung-lin 5–7, 7–6^{(7–1)}, 6–1.

=== Doubles ===
- (Argentina) Franco Agamenone / (Brazil) Fernando Romboli def. (Argentina) Facundo Argüello / (Uruguay) Martín Cuevas 7–6^{(7–5)}, 1–6, [10–6].
