= 2014 Challenger ATP Cachantún Cup =

- Date: 14–20 April
- Edition: 7th
- Draw: 32S / 16D
- Prize money: $35,000+H
- Surface: Clay
- Location: Santiago, Chile

Champions

Singles
- (Netherlands) Thiemo de Bakker

Doubles
- (Chile) Cristian Garín / (Chile) Nicolás Jarry
← 2013 ·	Challenger ATP Cachantún Cup	· 2015 →

The 2014 Challenger ATP Cachantún Cup was a professional tennis tournament played on clay courts. It was the seventh edition of the tournament which was part of the 2014 ATP Challenger Tour. It took place in Santiago, Chile between 14 and 20 April.

== ATP entrants ==
=== Seeds ===
Country	Player	Rank	Seed
USA	Denis Kudla	108	1
ARG	Facundo Argüello	123	2
ARG	Guido Andreozzi	139	3
USA	Wayne Odesnik	144	4
AUS	James Duckworth	161	5
FRA	Lucas Pouille	180	6
ARG	Renzo Olivo	204	7
ARG	Andrea Collarini	205	8

=== Other entrants ===
The following players received wildcards into the singles main draw:

- (Chile) Guillermo Núñez
- (Chile) Matías Sborowitz
- (Chile) Bastián Malla
- (Chile) Nicolás Jarry

The following players received entry from the qualifying draw:

- (Argentina) Pedro Cachin
- (Chile) Jorge Aguilar
- (Netherlands) Thiemo de Bakker
- (Argentina) Juan Pablo Paz

== Doubles main-draw entrants ==
=== Seeds ===
Country	Player	Country	Player	Rank	Seed
DOM	José Hernández	ARG	Eduardo Schwank	601	1
BOL	Hugo Dellien	ARG	Renzo Olivo	648	2
CHI	Jorge Aguilar	CHI	Hans Podlipnik Castillo	636	3
ARG	Guido Andreozzi	ARG	Andrea Collarini	647	4

=== Other entrants ===
The following pairs received wildcards into the doubles main draw:

- (Chile) David Fleming / (Chile) Víctor Núñez
- (Argentina) Alejandro Fabbri / (Argentina) Tomás Lipovšek Puches
- (Argentina) Pedro Cachin / (Chile) Guillermo Nunez

== Champions ==
=== Singles ===
- (Netherlands) Thiemo de Bakker def. (Australia) James Duckworth, 4–6, 7–6^{(12–10)}, 6–1

=== Doubles ===
- (Chile) Cristian Garín / (Chile) Nicolás Jarry def. (Chile) Jorge Aguilar / (Chile) Hans Podlipnik Castillo by Walkover
