= 2019 Challenger ATP Cachantún Cup – Doubles =

Doubles
- 2019 Challenger ATP Cachantún Cup

Final
- Champions: (Argentina) Franco Agamenone (Brazil) Fernando Romboli
- Runners-up: (Argentina) Facundo Argüello (Uruguay) Martín Cuevas
- Score: 7–6^{(7–5)}, 1–6, [10–6]

Events
Singles	Doubles
- Challenger ATP Cachantún Cup

Romain Arneodo and Jonathan Eysseric were the defending champions but chose not to defend their title.

Franco Agamenone and Fernando Romboli won the title after defeating Facundo Argüello and Martín Cuevas 7–6^{(7–5)}, 1–6, [10–6] in the final.

== Seeds ==
1. (Ecuador) Gonzalo Escobar / (Brazil) Fabrício Neis (first round)
2. (Bolivia) Hugo Dellien / (Argentina) Guillermo Durán (semifinals)
3. (Argentina) Franco Agamenone / (Brazil) Fernando Romboli (champions)
4. (Argentina) Facundo Argüello / (Uruguay) Martín Cuevas (final)

== Draw ==
Key

- Q = Qualifier
- WC = Wild card
- LL = Lucky loser
- Alt = Alternate
- ITF = ITF entry
- PR = Protected ranking
- SR = Special ranking
- SE = Special exempt
- JE = Junior exempt
- JR = Junior Accelerator Programme entrant
- CO = College Accelerator Programme entrant
- NG = Next Gen Accelerator Program entrant
- w/o = Walkover
- r = Retired
- d = Defaulted

First round
1	(Ecuador) G Escobar (Brazil) F Neis	3	5
WC	(Chile) MT Barrios Vera (Chile) G Lama	6	7
ITF	(Argentina) MF Descotte (Argentina) C Ugo Carabelli	1	2
(Peru) S Galdós (Brazil) T Monteiro	6	6
3	(Argentina) F Agamenone (Brazil) F Romboli	6	7^{7}
(Belgium) K Coppejans (Slovakia) A Martin	4	6^{3}
(Italy) GM Moroni (Spain) C Taberner	7^{7}	5	[10]
(Spain) G Granollers (India) S Nagal	6^{4}	7	[5]
WC	(Chile) Bastián Malla (Chile) Víctor Núñez	w/o
ITF	(Brazil) J Menezes (Brazil) J Souza
WC	(Ecuador) D Hidalgo (Chile) A Tabilo	7	6^{3}	[2]
4	(Argentina) F Argüello (Uruguay) M Cuevas	5	7^{7}	[10]
(Argentina) A Collarini (Argentina) F Coria	6	5	[9]
PR	(Argentina) F Mena (Argentina) R Olivo	1	7	[11]
(Spain) D Gimeno Traver (Spain) P Martínez	7	3	[7]
2	(Bolivia) H Dellien (Argentina) G Durán	5	6	[10]

Quarterfinals
WC	(Chile) MT Barrios Vera (Chile) G Lama	7	6
(Peru) S Galdós (Brazil) T Monteiro	5	4
3	(Argentina) F Agamenone (Brazil) F Romboli	5	6	[10]
(Italy) GM Moroni (Spain) C Taberner	7	2	[8]
WC	(Chile) B Malla (Chile) V Núñez	2	1
4	(Argentina) F Argüello (Uruguay) M Cuevas	6	6
PR	(Argentina) F Mena (Argentina) R Olivo	1	6	[6]
2	(Bolivia) H Dellien (Argentina) G Durán	6	4	[10]

Semifinals
WC	(Chile) MT Barrios Vera (Chile) G Lama	6^{3}	3
3	(Argentina) F Agamenone (Brazil) F Romboli	7^{7}	6
4	(Argentina) F Argüello (Uruguay) M Cuevas	6	3	[10]
2	(Bolivia) H Dellien (Argentina) G Durán	1	6	[7]

Final
3	(Argentina) F Agamenone (Brazil) F Romboli	7^{7}	1	[10]
4	(Argentina) F Argüello (Uruguay) M Cuevas	6^{5}	6	[6]
