= 2026 Challenger de Santiago =

- Date: 9–15 March
- Edition: 20th
- Surface: Clay
- Location: Santiago, Chile

Champions

Singles
- (Argentina) Genaro Alberto Olivieri

Doubles
- (Italy) Gianluca Cadenasso / (Brazil) Paulo André Saraiva dos Santos
- Challenger de Santiago

The 2026 Challenger de Santiago was a professional tennis tournament played on clay courts. It was the 20th edition of the tournament which was part of the 2026 ATP Challenger Tour. It took place in Santiago, Chile between 9 and 15 March 2026.

== Singles main-draw entrants ==
=== Seeds ===
Country	Player	Rank^{1}	Seed
PAR	Daniel Vallejo	104	1
~~NED~~	~~Guy den Ouden~~	~~156~~	~~2~~
POR	Jaime Faria	163	3
POR	Henrique Rocha	169	4
ARG	Alex Barrena	179	5
COL	Daniel Elahi Galán	182	6
ARG	Juan Pablo Ficovich	186	7
BRA	João Lucas Reis da Silva	205	8

- ^{1} Rankings are as of 2 March 2026.

=== Other entrants ===
The following players received wildcards into the singles main draw:

- (Germany) Diego Dedura
- (Chile) Bastián Malla
- (Chile) Amador Salazar

The following players received entry into the singles main draw as alternates:

- (Brazil) Daniel Dutra da Silva
- (Argentina) Facundo Mena

The following players received entry from the qualifying draw:

- (United States) Cannon Kingsley
- (Brazil) Igor Marcondes
- (United States) Nicolas Moreno de Alboran
- (Brazil) Pedro Sakamoto
- (Chile) Benjamín Torrealba
- (Argentina) Gonzalo Villanueva

The following player received entry as a lucky loser:

- (Argentina) Guido Iván Justo

== Champions ==
=== Singles ===
- (Argentina) Genaro Alberto Olivieri def. (Portugal) Henrique Rocha 6–4, 6–4.

=== Doubles ===
- (Italy) Gianluca Cadenasso / (Brazil) Paulo André Saraiva dos Santos def. (Mexico) Miguel Ángel Reyes-Varela / (Bolivia) Federico Zeballos 6–3, 7–5.
