= 2012 Cachantún Cup =

- Date: 5–11 March
- Edition: 5th
- Location: Santiago, Chile

Champions
- (Chile) Paul Capdeville

Doubles
- (Chile) Paul Capdeville / (Uruguay) Marcel Felder
- Cachantún Cup (ATP)

The 2012 Cachantún Cup was a professional tennis tournament played on clay courts. It was the seventh edition of the tournament which was part of the 2012 ATP Challenger Tour. It took place in Santiago, Chile between 5 and 11 March.

== ATP entrants ==
=== Seeds ===
Country	Player	Rank^{1}	Seed
FRA	Éric Prodon	103	1
BRA	Rogério Dutra da Silva	111	2
ARG	Diego Junqueira	114	3
ARG	Horacio Zeballos	117	4
SVN	Blaž Kavčič	118	5
CHI	Paul Capdeville	132	6
ITA	Simone Bolelli	135	7
ARG	Facundo Bagnis	154	8

- ^{1} Rankings are as of February 27, 2012.

=== Other entrants ===
The following players received wildcards into the singles main draw:

- (Chile) Christian Garin
- (Chile) Gonzalo Lama
- (Chile) Matías Sborowitz
- (Argentina) Agustín Velotti

The following players received entry as an alternate into the singles main draw:

- (Argentina) Sebastián Decoud

The following players received entry as a special exempt into the singles main draw:

- (Argentina) Guido Pella

The following players received entry from the qualifying draw:

- (Argentina) Maximiliano Estévez
- (Brazil) Leonardo Kirche
- (Brazil) Fernando Romboli
- (Chile) Cristóbal Saavedra-Corvalán

== Champions ==
=== Singles ===
- (Chile) Paul Capdeville def. (Croatia) Antonio Veić, 6–3, 6–7^{(5–7)}, 6–3

=== Doubles ===
- (Chile) Paul Capdeville / (Uruguay) Marcel Felder def. (Chile) Jorge Aguilar / (Mexico) Daniel Garza, 6–7^{(3–7)}, 6–4, [10–7]
