= 2017 Challenger ATP Cachantún Cup =

- Date: 6 – 11 March
- Edition: 10th
- Draw: 32S / 16D
- Prize money: $50,000+H
- Surface: Red clay
- Location: Santiago, Chile

Champions

Singles
- (Brazil) Rogério Dutra Silva

Doubles
- (Chile) Marcelo Tomás Barrios Vera / (Chile) Nicolás Jarry
- Challenger ATP Cachantún Cup

The 2017 Challenger ATP Cachantún Cup was a professional tennis tournament played on red clay courts. It was the 10th edition of the tournament which will be part of the 2017 ATP Challenger Tour. It took place in Santiago, Chile between 6 and 11 March 2017.

== Singles main-draw entrants ==
=== Seeds ===
Country	Player	Rank^{1}	Seed
BRA	Rogério Dutra Silva	84	1
ARG	Nicolás Kicker	100	2
AUT	Gerald Melzer	107	3
JPN	Taro Daniel	117	4
BEL	Arthur De Greef	120	5
ESP	Íñigo Cervantes	125	6
ITA	Alessandro Giannessi	127	7
BRA	João Souza	131	8

- ^{1} Rankings are as of February 27, 2017.

=== Other entrants ===
The following players received wildcards into the singles main draw:

- (Chile) Marcelo Tomás Barrios Vera
- (Chile) Nicolás Jarry
- (Chile) Hans Podlipnik Castillo
- (Chile) Matías Soto

The following player received entry using a protected ranking:

- (Italy) Simone Bolelli

The following players received entry from the qualifying draw:

- (Brazil) Guilherme Clezar
- (Bolivia) Hugo Dellien
- (Sweden) Christian Lindell
- (Peru) Juan Pablo Varillas

== Champions ==
=== Singles ===
- (Brazil) Rogério Dutra Silva def. (Chile) Nicolás Jarry 7–5, 6–3.

=== Doubles ===
- (Chile) Marcelo Tomás Barrios Vera / (Chile) Nicolás Jarry def. (Argentina) Máximo González / (Argentina) Andrés Molteni 6–4, 6–3.
