= Juan Carlos Sáez =

Chilean tennis player

- Country (sports): Chile
- Born: 5 August 1991 (age 33)
- Plays: Right-handed (two handed-backhand)
- Prize money: $108,816

Singles
- Career record: 3–0 (at ATP Tour level, Grand Slam level, and in Davis Cup)
- Career titles: 8 ITF
- Highest ranking: No. 230 (28 September 2015)

Doubles
- Career record: 0–1 (at ATP Tour level, Grand Slam level, and in Davis Cup)
- Career titles: 21 ITF
- Highest ranking: No. 285 (29 June 2015)
- Last updated on: 10 March 2023.

Juan Carlos Sáez (born 5 August 1991) is a suspended Chilean tennis player. Sáez has a career high ATP singles ranking of 230 achieved on 28 September 2015. Sáez has won 8 ITF singles events and 20 ITF doubles events on the futures circuit. Sáez made his ATP main draw doubles debut at the 2014 Royal Guard Open, partnering Gonzalo Lama losing to Daniele Bracciali and Potito Starace in the first round, 0–6, 6–3, [6–10]. In August 2019 Sáez was suspended for eight years for match-fixing.

== ATP Challengers and ITF Futures finals ==
=== Singles ===
Legend
ATP Challengers (0–0)
ITF Futures (8–13)

Result	W–L	Date	Tournament	Tier	Surface	Opponent	Score
Loss	0–1	Jul 2011	Chile F3	Futures	Clay	(Chile) Cristóbal Saavedra Corvalán	6–2, 6–7^{(3–7)}, 6–7^{(5–7)}
Loss	0–2	May 2012	Chile F5	Futures	Clay	(Argentina) Sebastián Decoud	2–6, 2–6
Loss	0–3	Jul 2012	Belgium F2	Futures	Clay	(Belgium) Yannik Reuter	7–5, 6–7^{(6–8)}, 6–7^{(1–7)}
Loss	0–4	Jul 2012	Belgium F3	Futures	Clay	(Belgium) Germain Gigounon	4–6, 6–7^{(1–7)}
Win	1–4	Oct 2012	Chile F8	Futures	Clay	(Chile) Felipe Rios	3–6, 6–2, 6–1
Win	2–4	Dec 2012	Chile F13	Futures	Clay	(Spain) Albert Alcaraz Ivorra	6–3, 4–6, 6–1
Win	3–4	Oct 2013	Chile F6	Futures	Clay	(Argentina) Facundo Mena	6–4, 6–2
Loss	3–5	Jul 2014	Serbia F5	Futures	Clay	(Croatia) Matej Sabanov	0–6, 2–6
Win	4–5	Sep 2014	Peru F5	Futures	Clay	(Chile) Cristóbal Saavedra Corvalán	6–4, 7–5
Loss	4–6	Sep 2014	Peru F6	Futures	Clay	(Brazil) Tiago Lopes	6–1, 2–6, 3–6
Loss	4–7	Oct 2014	Peru F7	Futures	Clay	(Peru) Duilio Beretta	4–6, 1–6
Win	5–7	Oct 2014	Peru F9	Futures	Clay	(Monaco) Benjamin Balleret	4–6, 6–1, 6–1
Loss	5–8	Dec 2014	Chile F10	Futures	Clay	(Chile) Hans Podlipnik Castillo	4–6, 4–6
Win	6–8	Feb 2015	Viña del Mar, Chile	Futures	Clay	(Chile) Jorge Aguilar	4–6, 7–6^{(7–2)}, 6–2
Win	7–8	Apr 2015	Santiago, Chile	Futures	Clay	(Sweden) Christian Lindell	0–6, 7–6^{(7–5)}, 6–3
Loss	7–9	Feb 2016	Palm Coast, United States	Futures	Clay	(Argentina) Agustín Velotti	4–6, 6–4, 3–6
Win	8–9	Feb 2016	Plantation, Florida, United States	Futures	Clay	(Romania) Victor Hănescu	6–3, 2–6, 7–6^{(7–5)}
Loss	8–10	May 2016	Buenos Aires, Argentina	Futures	Clay	(Brazil) Daniel Dutra da Silva	6–1, 2–6, 3–6
Loss	8–11	Mar 2018	Hammamet, Tunisia	Futures	Clay	(Spain) Oriol Roca Batalla	5–7, 1–6
Loss	8–12	May 2018	Villa María, Argentina	Futures	Clay	(Argentina) Camilo Ugo Carabelli	6–7^{(3–7)}, 3–6
Loss	8–13	Nov 2018	Viña del Mar, Chile	Futures	Clay	(Peru) Mauricio Echazú	1–6, 2–6

=== Doubles ===
Legend (singles)
Challengers (0–2)
Futures (21–16)

Result	W–L	Date	Tournament	Tier	Surface	Partner	Opponent	Score
Loss	0–1	Nov 2010	Chile F6	Futures	Clay	(Chile) Javier Muñoz	(Chile) Guillermo Rivera Aránguiz (Chile) Cristóbal Saavedra Corvalán	3–6, 4–6
Win	1–1	Dec 2010	Chile F9	Futures	Clay	(Chile) Javier Muñoz	(Argentina) Patricio Heras (Argentina) Gustavo Sterin	6–4, 6–4
Loss	1–2	May 2011	Brazil F12	Futures	Clay	(Chile) Rodrigo Perez	(Brazil) Bruno Santanna (Brazil) Karue Sell	2–6, 7–6^{(7–3)}, [7–10]
Win	2–2	Oct 2011	Chile F10	Futures	Clay	(Chile) Javier Muñoz	(Chile) Alex Theiler (Chile) Ricardo Urzua-Rivera	3–6, 7–5, [17–15]
Win	3–2	Nov 2011	Chile F13	Futures	Clay	(Chile) Javier Muñoz	(Venezuela) Luis David Martinez (Mexico) Manuel Sánchez	3–6, 6–4, [10–1]
Loss	3–3	Apr 2012	Argentina F8	Futures	Clay	(Chile) Cristóbal Saavedra Corvalán	(Peru) Sergio Galdós (Ecuador) Diego Hidalgo	6–3, 3–6, [6–10]
Win	4–3	Jun 2012	Chile F6	Futures	Clay	(Chile) Jorge Aguilar	(Chile) Guillermo Rivera Aránguiz (Chile) Cristóbal Saavedra Corvalán	4–6, 6–1, [10–5]
Win	5–3	Jun 2012	Chile F7	Futures	Clay	(Chile) Jorge Aguilar	(Argentina) Federico Coria (Argentina) Sebastián Decoud	6–1, 6–2
Loss	5–4	Jul 2012	Belgium F5	Futures	Clay	(Belgium) Joris De Loore	(South Africa) Jean Andersen (Kuwait) Abdullah Maqdes	3–6, 6–3, [10–12]
Win	6–4	Aug 2012	Belgium F6	Futures	Clay	(Belgium) Joris De Loore	(Belgium) Niels Desein (Belgium) James Junior Storme	6–0, 6–4
Loss	6–5	Aug 2012	Italy F23	Futures	Clay	(Chile) Jorge Aguilar	(Germany) Alexander Satschko (Germany) Jan-Lennard Struff	6–4, 4–6, [7–10]
Win	7–5	Dec 2012	Chile F13	Futures	Clay	(Chile) Jorge Aguilar	(Chile) Guillermo Rivera Aránguiz (Chile) Cristóbal Saavedra Corvalán	6–2, 6–2
Loss	7–6	Dec 2012	Chile F16	Futures	Clay	(Chile) Jorge Aguilar	(Chile) Jorge Montero (Chile) Felipe Rios	6–3, 5–7, [7–10]
Win	8–6	Jul 2013	Belgium F3	Futures	Clay	(Belgium) Joris De Loore	(Chile) Juan Matias Gonzalez Carrasco (Argentina) Nicolás Kicker	6–1, 6–4
Loss	8–7	Jul 2013	Belgium F4	Futures	Clay	(Belgium) Joris De Loore	(Belgium) Maxime Braeckman (Belgium) Sander Gillé	2–6, 7–5, [6–10]
Win	9–7	Sep 2013	Chile F4	Futures	Clay	(Chile) Ricardo Urzua-Rivera	(Chile) Guillermo Rivera Aránguiz (Chile) Cristóbal Saavedra Corvalán	7–5, 6–0
Win	10–7	Oct 2013	Chile F6	Futures	Clay	(Chile) Ricardo Urzua-Rivera	(Colombia) Juan Manuel Benitez Chavarriaga (Argentina) Juan Pablo Paz	7–5, 6–2
Win	11–7	Nov 2013	Chile F7	Futures	Clay	(Chile) Ricardo Urzua-Rivera	(Chile) David Fleming (Chile) Victor Nuñez	6–1, 6–3
Win	12–7	Jun 2014	Serbia F3	Futures	Clay	(Chile) Ricardo Urzua-Rivera	(Serbia) Danilo Petrović (Serbia) Ilija Vucic	6–2, 6–4
Win	13–7	Jun 2014	Bulgaria F4	Futures	Clay	(Chile) Ricardo Urzua-Rivera	(Spain) Albert Alcaraz Ivorra (Russia) Georgyi Malyshev	6–1, 6–0
Win	14–7	Jul 2014	Serbia F4	Futures	Clay	(Chile) Ricardo Urzua-Rivera	(Serbia) Danilo Petrović (Serbia) Ilija Vucic	7–5, 6–2
Loss	14–8	Jul 2014	Serbia F5	Futures	Clay	(Chile) Ricardo Urzua-Rivera	(Serbia) Miki Janković (Serbia) Darko Jandric	5–7, 6–4, [8–10]
Win	15–8	May 2015	Romania F4	Futures	Clay	(Chile) Hans Podlipnik Castillo	(Romania) Alexandru-Daniel Carpen (Serbia) Ilija Vucic	6–3, 4–6, [10–7]
Loss	0–1	Jun 2015	Milan, Italy	Challenger	Clay	(Chile) Cristian Garín	(Croatia) Nikola Mektić (Croatia) Antonio Šančić	3–6, 4–6
Loss	0–2	Oct 2015	Porto Alegre, Brazil	Challenger	Clay	(Chile) Cristian Garín	(Portugal) Gastão Elias (Portugal) Frederico Ferreira Silva	2–6, 4–6
Win	16–8	Oct 2015	Rancagua, Chile	Futures	Clay	(Chile) Mauricio Alvarez-Guzman	(Chile) Guillermo Rivera Aránguiz (Chile) Cristóbal Saavedra Corvalán	6–3, 6–7^{(4–7)}, [10–7]
Win	17–8	Feb 2016	Palm Coast, United States	Futures	Clay	(Chile) Nicolás Jarry	(Hungary) Péter Nagy (United States) Will Spencer	6–1, 6–2
Loss	17–9	May 2016	Córdoba, Argentina	Futures	Clay	(Chile) Ricardo Urzua-Rivera	(Brazil) João Pedro Sorgi (Brazil) Marcelo Zormann	4–6, 6–3, [9–11]
Loss	17–10	May 2016	Buenos Aires, Argentina	Futures	Clay	(Chile) Ricardo Urzua-Rivera	(Argentina) Gabriel Alejandro Hidalgo (Argentina) Eduardo Agustin Torre	1–6, 6–0, [9–11]
Win	18–10	Apr 2017	Tel Aviv, Israel	Futures	Hard	(Argentina) Matías Franco Descotte	(Hungary) Gabor Borsos (Hungary) Viktor Filipenko	6–4, 6–4
Loss	18–11	Apr 2017	Antalya, Turkey	Futures	Hard	(Ukraine) Volodymyr Uzhylovskyi	(Sweden) Isak Arvidsson (Turkey) Anil Yuksel	4–6, 0–6
Loss	18–12	Jun 2017	Antalya, Turkey	Futures	Clay	(Brazil) Ricardo Hocevar	(Venezuela) Jordi Muñoz Abreu (Spain) David Pérez Sanz	4–6, 3–6
Win	19–12	Jun 2017	Havré, Belgium	Futures	Clay	(Chile) Marcelo Plaza	(France) Quentin Folliot (Germany) Lukas Ollert	6–4, 6–4
Loss	19–13	Mar 2018	Hammamet, Tunisia	Futures	Clay	(Argentina) Mariano Kestelboim	(Argentina) Hernán Casanova (Argentina) Tomás Lipovšek	6–1, 4–6, [2–10]
Loss	19–14	Apr 2018	Hammamet, Tunisia	Futures	Clay	(Colombia) Daniel Mora	(Czech Republic) Michal Konecny (Czech Republic) Matěj Vocel	3–6, 1–6
Loss	19–15	Apr 2018	Madrid, Spain	Futures	Clay	(Ecuador) Diego Hidalgo	(Argentina) Pedro Cachin (Argentina) Patricio Heras	6–7^{(2–7)}, 6–3, [7–10]
Win	20–15	May 2018	Villa del Dique, Argentina	Futures	Clay	(Argentina) Eduardo Agustín Torre	(Argentina) Facundo Argüello (Argentina) Matías Zukas	6–3, 1–6, [10–7]
Loss	20–16	May 2018	Villa María, Argentina	Futures	Clay	(Argentina) Eduardo Agustín Torre	(Argentina) Facundo Argüello (Argentina) Matías Zukas	2–6, 2–6
Win	21–16	May 2018	Viña del Mar, Chile	Futures	Clay	(Argentina) Mateo Nicolás Martínez	(Peru) Mauricio Echazú (Peru) Jorge Panta	6–3, 7–6^{(7–0)}
