= Guillermo Rivera Aránguiz =

Chilean tennis player

Guillermo Rivera
- Full name: Guillermo Andrés Rivera Aránguiz
- Country (sports): Chile
- Residence: Santiago, Chile
- Born: 2 February 1989 (age 36) San Felipe, Chile
- Turned pro: 2007
- Retired: 2017
- Plays: Right-handed (two-handed backhand)
- Prize money: $104,804

Singles
- Career record: 0–1 (at ATP Tour level, Grand Slam level, and in Davis Cup)
- Career titles: 0
- Highest ranking: No. 271 (29 August 2011)

Doubles
- Highest ranking: No. 257 (25 July 2011)

Guillermo Rivera Aránguiz
Medal record

Tennis

Representing Chile

Pan American Games
Silver medal – second place	2011 Guadalajara	Mixed Doubles

Guillermo Andrés Rivera Aránguiz (Latin American Spanish: [ɡiˈʝeɾmo anˈdɾes riˈβeɾa aˈɾaŋɡis]; born 2 February 1989) is a Chilean former professional tennis player. Rivera represented Chile in March 2011 against the United States, making his Davis Cup debut by playing the fifth rubber against John Isner, losing the match 3–6, 7–6, 5–7. It would be the only Davis Cup match of his career.

== Singles finals ==
Legend (singles)
Challengers (0–0)
Futures (7–13)

Outcome	No.	Date	Tournament	Surface	Opponent	Score
Runner-up	1.	19 April 2009	Argentina F1	Clay	(Argentina) Guido Pella	3–6, 4–6
Runner-up	2.	14 June 2009	Argentina F8	Clay	(Argentina) Marco Trungelliti	6–4, 2–6, 1–5 Ret
Runner-up	3.	11 October 2009	Chile F1	Clay	(Chile) Jorge Aguilar	6–7^{(7–9)}, 2–6
Winner	1.	14 June 2010	Argentina F9	Clay	(Argentina) Maximiliano Estévez	6–3, 3–6, 6–3
Runner-up	4.	22 August 2010	Colombia F1	Clay	(Argentina) Sebastián Decoud	4–6, 3–6
Runner-up	5.	29 August 2010	Colombia F2	Clay	(Argentina) Sebastián Decoud	6–7^{(6–8)}, 5–7
Winner	2.	18 October 2010	Chile F1	Clay	(Peru) Mauricio Echazú	6–2, 4–6, 7–5
Runner-up	6.	1 November 2010	Chile F2	Clay	(Chile) Guillermo Hormazábal	5–7, 2–6
Winner	3.	15 November 2010	Chile F5	Clay	(Argentina) Pablo Galdón	6–2, 6–3
Runner-up	7.	28 March 2011	Chile F1	Clay	(Italy) Stefano Travaglia	2–6, 4–6
Runner-up	8.	20 June 2011	Chile F4	Clay	(Chile) Cristóbal Saavedra-Corvalán	4–5 Ret
Runner-up	9.	15 August 2011	Colombia F3	Clay	(Colombia) Eduardo Struvay	2–6, 6–7^{(7–9)}
Winner	4.	14 November 2011	Chile F13	Clay	(Chile) Hans Podlipnik	6–4, 6–4
Runner-up	10.	20 February 2012	Chile F3	Clay	(Austria) Gerald Melzer	6–7^{(4–7)}, 3–6
Runner-up	11.	28 May 2012	Chile F6	Clay	(Chile) Cristóbal Saavedra-Corvalán	4–6, 1–6
Runner-up	12.	4 June 2012	Chile F7	Clay	(Chile) Jorge Aguilar	6–7^{(4–7)}, 4–6
Winner	5.	29 October 2012	Chile F11	Clay	(Brazil) Gustavo Guerses	7–6^{(7–3)}, 6–0
Winner	6.	24 November 2012	Chile F12	Clay	(Italy) Gianluigi Quinzi	6–4, 6–4
Runner-up	13.	10 December 2012	Chile F15	Clay	(Chile) Jorge Aguilar	7–5, 3–6, 3–6
Winner	7.	6 June 2014	Bulgaria F14	Clay	(Bulgaria) Tihomir Grozdanov	5–7, 6–3, 6–1
