= Challenger ATP Cachantún Cup =

Tennis tournament in Chile

Challenger Santiago
- 2026 Challenger de Santiago

ATP Challenger Tour
- Event name: Challenger de Providencia (2005–2009); Copa Cachantún (2011–2016); Challenger Cachantún Open (2017); Cachantún Open by Kia (2018-2019); Challenger Santiago Chile (2021 I); Dove Men+Care Legion Sudamericana (2021 II, III); Copa Universidad San Sebastián (Copa USS) (2022); Challenger Santiago Dove Men+Care (2023-)
- Founded: 2005
- Editions: 20 (2026)
- Location: Vitacura, Santiago Metropolitan Region, Chile
- Venue: Club Manquehue
- Category: ATP Challenger Tour
- Surface: Clay (red)
- Draw: 32S/29Q/15D
- Prize money: $82,000+H (2024), $100,000 (2025)

Current champions (2026)
- Singles: (Argentina) Genaro Alberto Olivieri
- Doubles: (Italy) Gianluca Cadenasso (Brazil) Paulo André Saraiva dos Santos

The Challenger de Santiago, known as Challenger de Santiago Dove Men+Care (formerly known as the Copa USS, Cachantún Open by KIA and the Cachantún Cup), is a professional tennis tournament played on outdoor red clay courts. It is part of the Association of Tennis Professionals (ATP) Challenger Tour. It was held annually in Providencia, Chile, from 2005 to 2009. The tournament was then moved to Vitacura, Santiago Metropolitan Region. The October 2021 editions were played at the Club Palestino in Las Condes.

== Past finals ==
=== Singles ===
Year	Champion	Runner-up	Score
2005	(Germany) Tomas Behrend	(Chile) Adrián García	7–6^{(7–3)}, 4–6, 6–2
2006	(Serbia) Boris Pašanski	(Chile) Paul Capdeville	6–2, 7–6^{(11–9)}
2007	(Argentina) Martín Vassallo Argüello	(Italy) Fabio Fognini	1–6, 7–5, 6–4
2008	(Brazil) Thomaz Bellucci	(Argentina) Eduardo Schwank	6–3, 3–6, 6–1
2009	(Argentina) Máximo González (1)	(Argentina) Mariano Zabaleta	6–4, 6–3
2010	Cancelled due to the 2010 Chile earthquake		
2011	(Argentina) Máximo González (2)	(France) Éric Prodon	7–5, 0–6, 6–2
2012	(Chile) Paul Capdeville	(Croatia) Antonio Veić	6–3, 6–7^{(5–7)}, 6–3
2013	(Argentina) Facundo Bagnis (1)	(Netherlands) Thiemo de Bakker	7–6^{(7–2)}, 7–6^{(7–3)}
2014	(Netherlands) Thiemo de Bakker	(Australia) James Duckworth	4–6, 7–6^{(12–10)}, 6–1
2015	(Argentina) Facundo Bagnis (2)	(Brazil) Guilherme Clezar	6–2, 5–7, 6–2
2016	(Argentina) Facundo Bagnis (3)	(Brazil) Rogério Dutra Silva	6–7^{(3–7)}, 6–4, 6–3
2017	(Brazil) Rogério Dutra Silva	(Chile) Nicolás Jarry	7–5, 6–3
2018	(Italy) Marco Cecchinato	(Spain) Carlos Gómez-Herrera	1–6, 6–1, 6–1
2019	(Bolivia) Hugo Dellien (1)	(Chinese Taipei) Wu Tung-lin	5–7, 7–6^{(7–1)}, 6–1
2020	Cancelled due to the COVID-19 pandemic in Chile		
2021 (1)	(Argentina) Sebastián Báez (1)	(Chile) Marcelo Tomás Barrios Vera	6–3, 7–6^{(7–4)}
2021 (2)	(Peru) Juan Pablo Varillas (1)	(Argentina) Sebastián Báez	6–4, 7–5
2021 (3)	(Argentina) Sebastián Báez (2)	(Brazil) Felipe Meligeni Alves	3–6, 7–6^{(8–6)}, 6–1
2022	(Bolivia) Hugo Dellien (2)	(Chile) Alejandro Tabilo	6–3, 4–6, 6–4
2023	(Bolivia) Hugo Dellien (3)	(Brazil) Thiago Seyboth Wild	3–6, 6–3, 6–3
2024	(Peru) Juan Pablo Varillas (2)	(Argentina) Facundo Bagnis	6–3, 6–2
2025	(Colombia) Daniel Elahi Galán	(Brazil) Thiago Monteiro	7–5, 6–3
2026	(Argentina) Genaro Alberto Olivieri	(Portugal) Henrique Rocha	6–4, 6–4

=== Doubles ===
Year	Champions	Runners-up	Score
2005	(Ecuador) Giovanni Lapentti (Argentina) Damián Patriarca	(Italy) Enzo Artoni (Argentina) Ignacio González King	6–2, 4–6, 6–4,
2006	(Argentina) Sergio Roitman (Argentina) Máximo González (1)	(Chile) Felipe Parada (Chile) Jorge Aguilar	6–4, 6–3,
2007	(Argentina) Brian Dabul (Spain) Marc López	(Argentina) Horacio Zeballos (Uruguay) Pablo Cuevas	6–2, 3–6, [10–8]
2008	(Argentina) Eduardo Schwank (Argentina) Mariano Hood	(Argentina) Brian Dabul (Netherlands Antilles) Jean-Julien Rojer	6–3, 6–3
2009	(Argentina) Horacio Zeballos (1) (Argentina) Sebastián Prieto	(Brazil) Flávio Saretta (Brazil) Rogério Dutra da Silva	7–6^{(7–2)}, 6–2
2010	Cancelled due to the 2010 Chile earthquake		
2011	(Argentina) Máximo González (2) (Argentina) Horacio Zeballos (2)	(Chile) Guillermo Rivera Aránguiz (Chile) Cristóbal Saavedra-Corvalán	6–3, 6–4
2012	(Chile) Paul Capdeville (Uruguay) Marcel Felder	(Chile) Jorge Aguilar (Mexico) Daniel Garza	6–7^{(3–7)}, 6–4, [10–7]
2013	(Brazil) Marcelo Demoliner (Brazil) João Souza	(Argentina) Federico Delbonis (Argentina) Diego Junqueira	7–5, 6–1
2014	(Chile) Christian Garin (Chile) Nicolás Jarry (1)	(Chile) Jorge Aguilar (Chile) Hans Podlipnik-Castillo	Walkover
2015	(Argentina) Andrés Molteni (Argentina) Guido Pella	(Argentina) Andrea Collarini (Argentina) Máximo González	7–6^{(9–7)}, 3–6, [10–4]
2016	(Chile) Julio Peralta (Chile) Hans Podlipnik	(Argentina) Facundo Bagnis (Argentina) Máximo González	7–6^{(7–4)}, 4–6, [10–5]
2017	(Chile) Marcelo Tomás Barrios Vera (Chile) Nicolás Jarry (2)	(Argentina) Máximo González (Argentina) Andrés Molteni	6–4, 6–3
2018	(Monaco) Romain Arneodo (France) Jonathan Eysseric	(Argentina) Guido Andreozzi (Argentina) Guillermo Durán	7–6^{(7–4)}, 1–6, [12–10]
2019	(Argentina) Franco Agamenone (Brazil) Fernando Romboli	(Argentina) Facundo Argüello (Uruguay) Martín Cuevas	7–6^{(7–5)}, 1–6, [10–6]
2020	Cancelled due to the COVID-19 pandemic in Chile		
2021 (1)	(Venezuela) Luis David Martínez (Portugal) Gonçalo Oliveira	(Brazil) Rafael Matos (Brazil) Felipe Meligeni Alves	7–5, 6–1
2021 (2)	(Ecuador) Diego Hidalgo (1) (Chile) Nicolás Jarry (3)	(United States) Evan King (United States) Max Schnur	6–3, 5–7, [10–6]
2021 (3)	(United States) Evan King (United States) Max Schnur	(Mexico) Hans Hach Verdugo (Mexico) Miguel Ángel Reyes-Varela	3–6, 7–6^{(7–3)}, [16–14]
2022	(Ecuador) Diego Hidalgo (2) (Colombia) Cristian Rodríguez	(Argentina) Pedro Cachin (Argentina) Facundo Mena	6–4, 6–4
2023	(Brazil) Pedro Boscardin Dias (Brazil) João Lucas Reis da Silva	(Ecuador) Diego Hidalgo (Colombia) Cristian Rodríguez	6–4, 3–6, [10–7]
2024	(Brazil) Fernando Romboli (Brazil) Marcelo Zormann	(Bolivia) Boris Arias (Bolivia) Federico Zeballos	7–6^{(7–5)}, 6–4
2025	(United States) Vasil Kirkov (Chile) Matías Soto	(Brazil) Mateus Alves (Brazil) Luís Britto	6–4, 6–3
2026	(Italy) Gianluca Cadenasso (Brazil) Paulo André Saraiva dos Santos	(Mexico) Miguel Ángel Reyes-Varela (Bolivia) Federico Zeballos	6–3, 7–5
