= 2017 Poprad-Tatry ATP Challenger Tour – Singles =

Singles
- 2017 Poprad-Tatry ATP Challenger Tour

Final
- Champion: (Germany) Cedrik-Marcel Stebe
- Runner-up: (Serbia) Laslo Đere
- Score: 6–0, 6–3

Events
Singles	Doubles
← 2016 ·	Poprad-Tatry ATP Challenger Tour	· 2018 →

Horacio Zeballos was the defending champion but chose not to defend his title.

Cedrik-Marcel Stebe won the title after defeating Laslo Đere 6–0, 6–3 in the final.

== Seeds ==
1. (Slovakia) Martin Kližan (quarterfinals)
2. (Colombia) Santiago Giraldo (second round)
3. (Serbia) Laslo Đere (final)
4. (Belarus) Uladzimir Ignatik (first round)
5. (Slovakia) Andrej Martin (first round)
6. (Spain) Roberto Carballés Baena (semifinals)
7. (Czech Republic) Adam Pavlásek (semifinals)
8. (Serbia) Filip Krajinović (quarterfinals)

== Draw ==
=== Key ===
- Q = Qualifier
- WC = Wild card
- LL = Lucky loser
- Alt = Alternate
- SE = Special exempt
- PR = Protected ranking
- ITF = ITF entry
- JE = Junior exempt
- w/o = Walkover
- r = Retired
- d = Defaulted
- SR = Special ranking

=== Finals ===
Semifinals
6	(Spain) Roberto Carballés Baena	2	5
3	(Serbia) Laslo Đere	6	7
(Germany) Cedrik-Marcel Stebe	6^{5}	6	6
7	(Czech Republic) Adam Pavlásek	7^{7}	4	3

Final
3	(Serbia) Laslo Đere	0	3
(Germany) Cedrik-Marcel Stebe	6	6

=== Top half ===
First round
1/WC	(Slovakia) M Kližan	6	6
WC	(Slovakia) Dominik Šproch	1	2
Q	(Serbia) N Ćaćić	6	6
Q	(Switzerland) L Margaroli	3	4
(Austria) M Linzer	6^{5}	7^{11}	6
(Czech Republic) Petr Michnev	7^{7}	6^{9}	4
(Argentina) F Coria	0	1
6	(Spain) R Carballés Baena	6	6
3	(Serbia) L Đere	6	6
(Egypt) M Safwat	3	2
(Serbia) D Petrović	1	3
(Czech Republic) Z Kolář	6	6
(Hungary) A Balázs	6	6
(Canada) F Dancevic	2	1
Q	(Austria) D Novak	4	0
8	(Serbia) F Krajinović	6	6

Second round
1/WC	(Slovakia) M Kližan	6^{4}	7	6
Q	(Serbia) N Ćaćić	7^{7}	5	1
(Austria) M Linzer	2	1^{r}
6	(Spain) R Carballés Baena	6	4
3	(Serbia) L Đere	1	7	7
(Czech Republic) Z Kolář	6	5	5
(Hungary) A Balázs	6^{4}	1
8	(Serbia) F Krajinović	7^{7}	6

Quarterfinals
1/WC	(Slovakia) M Kližan	2	3
6	(Spain) R Carballés Baena	6	6
3	(Serbia) L Đere	1	6	7
8	(Serbia) F Krajinović	6	4	5

Semifinals
6	(Spain) R Carballés Baena	2	5
3	(Serbia) L Đere	6	7

=== Bottom half ===
First round
5	(Slovakia) A Martin	7	2	4
WC	(Slovakia) A Molčan	5	6	6
(Australia) C O'Connell	4	4
(Sweden) E Ymer	6	6
(Germany) C-M Stebe	6	4
(Argentina) A Velotti	1	0^{r}
(South Africa) L Harris	7^{7}	6
4	(Belarus) U Ignatik	6^{4}	3
7	(Czech Republic) A Pavlásek	6	6
WC	(Slovakia) Péter Vajda	2	1
Q	(Slovakia) F Horanský	6	6^{7}	2
(Czech Republic) V Šafránek	4	7^{9}	6
(Austria) S Ofner	6	6
(Kazakhstan) D Popko	4	4
(Italy) R Bellotti	5	6	1
2	(Colombia) S Giraldo	7	3	6

Second round
WC	(Slovakia) A Molčan	2	6	6^{3}
(Sweden) E Ymer	6	1	7^{7}
(Germany) C-M Stebe	6	2	6
(South Africa) L Harris	1	6	2
7	(Czech Republic) A Pavlásek	3	7	6
(Czech Republic) V Šafránek	6	5	4
(Austria) S Ofner	4	6	7^{7}
2	(Colombia) S Giraldo	6	4	6^{0}

Quarterfinals
(Sweden) E Ymer	2	5
(Germany) C-M Stebe	6	7
7	(Czech Republic) A Pavlásek	6	7
(Austria) S Ofner	0	5

Semifinals
(Germany) C-M Stebe	6^{5}	6	6
7	(Czech Republic) A Pavlásek	7^{7}	4	3
