= 2016 Poprad-Tatry ATP Challenger Tour – Doubles =

Doubles
- 2016 Poprad-Tatry ATP Challenger Tour

Final
- Champions: (Uruguay) Ariel Behar; (Kazakhstan) Andrey Golubev
- Runners-up: (Czech Republic) Lukáš Dlouhý; (Slovakia) Andrej Martin
- Score: 6–2, 5–7, [10–5]

Events
Singles	Doubles
← 2015 ·	Poprad-Tatry ATP Challenger Tour	· 2017 →

Roman Jebavý and Jan Šátral were the defending champions but lost in the first round to Lukáš Dlouhý and Andrej Martin.

Ariel Behar and Andrey Golubev won the title after defeating Lukáš Dlouhý and Andrej Martin 6–2, 5–7, [10–5] in the final.

== Seeds ==
1. (Chile) Julio Peralta / (Chile) Hans Podlipnik (first round)
2. (Poland) Tomasz Bednarek / (Belarus) Sergey Betov (semifinals)
3. (Poland) Mateusz Kowalczyk / (Poland) Adam Majchrowicz (quarterfinals)
4. (Uruguay) Ariel Behar / (Kazakhstan) Andrey Golubev (champions)

== Draw ==
=== Key ===
- Q = Qualifier
- WC = Wild card
- LL = Lucky loser
- Alt = Alternate
- SE = Special exempt
- PR = Protected ranking
- ITF = ITF entry
- JE = Junior exempt
- w/o = Walkover
- r = Retired
- d = Defaulted
- SR = Special ranking

First round

Quarterfinals

Semifinals

Final

1
- (Chile) J Peralta
- (Chile) H Podlipnik
4
6
[4]

- (Austria) G Melzer
- (Austria) D Novak
6
3
[10]

- (Austria) G Melzer
- (Austria) D Novak
3
6
[7]

(Egypt) M Safwat
(Serbia) Ilija Vučić
w/o

(Egypt) M Safwat
(Serbia) I Vučić
6
3
[10]

- (Brazil) A Ghem
- (Ecuador) E Gómez

(Egypt) M Safwat
(Serbia) I Vučić
6
4
[9]

3
- (Poland) M Kowalczyk
- (Poland) A Majchrowicz
7^{7}
6

- (Czech Republic) L Dlouhý
- (Slovakia) A Martin
4
6
[11]

WC
(Czech Republic) M Michalička
(Slovakia) Dominik Šproch
6^{4}
2

3
- (Poland) M Kowalczyk
- (Poland) A Majchrowicz
3
3

- (Czech Republic) L Dlouhý
- (Slovakia) A Martin
6
3
[10]

- (Czech Republic) L Dlouhý
- (Slovakia) A Martin
6
6

- (Czech Republic) R Jebavý
- (Czech Republic) J Šátral
4
6
[4]

- (Czech Republic) L Dlouhý
- (Slovakia) A Martin
2
7
[5]

WC
- (Slovakia) Martin Blaško
- (Slovakia) A Molčan
2
2

4
- (Uruguay) A Behar
- (Kazakhstan) A Golubev
6
5
[10]

- (Belgium) K Coppejans
- (Belgium) J De Loore
6
6

- (Belgium) K Coppejans
- (Belgium) J De Loore
3
6^{5}

- (Argentina) F Argüello
- (Argentina) T Lipovšek Puches
2
6
[5]

4
- (Uruguay) A Behar
- (Kazakhstan) A Golubev
6
7^{7}

4
- (Uruguay) A Behar
- (Kazakhstan) A Golubev
6
3
[10]

4
- (Uruguay) A Behar
- (Kazakhstan) A Golubev
6
1
[10]

- (Sweden) I Arvidsson
- (Czech Republic) J Mertl
6
6

2
- (Poland) T Bednarek
- (Belarus) S Betov
3
6
[3]

WC
- (Slovakia) Patrik Fabian
- (Slovakia) N Gombos
4
3

- (Sweden) I Arvidsson
- (Czech Republic) J Mertl
6^{4}
6^{4}

- (Czech Republic) Petr Michnev
- (Chinese Taipei) T-h Yang
3
6^{5}

2
- (Poland) T Bednarek
- (Belarus) S Betov
7^{7}
7^{7}

2
- (Poland) T Bednarek
- (Belarus) S Betov
6
7^{7}
