= 2018 Poprad-Tatry ATP Challenger Tour – Singles =

Singles
- 2018 Poprad-Tatry ATP Challenger Tour

Final
- Champion: (Slovakia) Jozef Kovalík
- Runner-up: (Belgium) Arthur De Greef
- Score: 6–4, 6–0

Events
Singles	Doubles
← 2017 ·	Poprad-Tatry ATP Challenger Tour

Cedrik-Marcel Stebe was the defending champion but chose not to defend his title.

Jozef Kovalík won the title after defeating Arthur De Greef 6–4, 6–0 in the final.

== Seeds ==
1. (Austria) Gerald Melzer (second round, retired)
2. (Norway) Casper Ruud (second round)
3. (Czech Republic) Adam Pavlásek (quarterfinals)
4. (Slovakia) Jozef Kovalík (champion)
5. (Egypt) Mohamed Safwat (quarterfinals)
6. (Hungary) Attila Balázs (semifinals)
7. (Austria) Dennis Novak (quarterfinals)
8. (Belarus) Uladzimir Ignatik (first round)

== Draw ==
=== Key ===
- Q = Qualifier
- WC = Wild card
- LL = Lucky loser
- Alt = Alternate
- SE = Special exempt
- PR = Protected ranking
- ITF = ITF entry
- JE = Junior exempt
- w/o = Walkover
- r = Retired
- d = Defaulted
- SR = Special ranking

=== Finals ===
Semifinals
(Czech Republic) Zdeněk Kolář	1	2
4	(Slovakia) Jozef Kovalík	6	6
6	(Hungary) Attila Balázs	1	3
(Belgium) Arthur De Greef	6	6

Final
4	(Slovakia) Jozef Kovalík	6	6
(Belgium) Arthur De Greef	4	0

=== Top half ===
First round
1	(Austria) G Melzer	6	6
Q	(Czech Republic) Pavel Nejedlý	2	2
(Slovenia) B Rola	4	3
(Czech Republic) Z Kolář	6	6
(Croatia) A Pavić	4	2
(Austria) M Neuchrist	6	6
(Czech Republic) L Rosol	1	5
7	(Austria) D Novak	6	7
4	(Slovakia) J Kovalík	6	7
(Bosnia and Herzegovina) T Brkić	4	5
(Chinese Taipei) T-h Yang	6	6
Q	(Czech Republic) J Šátral	4	2
Q	(Austria) A Haider-Maurer	6	6
(Czech Republic) Marek Jaloviec	3	4
WC	(Slovakia) Peter Vajda	1	1
5	(Egypt) M Safwat	6	6

Second round
1	(Austria) G Melzer	4	0^{r}
(Czech Republic) Z Kolář	6	0
(Austria) M Neuchrist	2	4
7	(Austria) D Novak	6	6
4	(Slovakia) J Kovalík	6	7
(Chinese Taipei) T-h Yang	2	5
Q	(Austria) A Haider-Maurer	5	6	4
5	(Egypt) M Safwat	7	1	6

Quarterfinals
(Czech Republic) Z Kolář	6	6
7	(Austria) D Novak	2	2
4	(Slovakia) J Kovalík	6^{7}	7^{7}	6
5	(Egypt) M Safwat	7^{9}	6^{5}	4

Semifinals
(Czech Republic) Z Kolář	1	2
4	(Slovakia) J Kovalík	6	6

=== Bottom half ===
First round
6	(Hungary) A Balázs	6	6
(Italy) M Viola	3	3
(Serbia) P Krstin	5	6	6^{2}
(Czech Republic) V Šafránek	7	4	7^{7}
WC	(Slovakia) Andrej Glváč	4	6	6
WC	(Slovakia) Dominik Šproch	6	0	2
Q	(Canada) F Dancevic	5	0^{r}
3	(Czech Republic) A Pavlásek	7	0
8	(Belarus) U Ignatik	2	6	3
(Belgium) A De Greef	6	3	6
(Spain) D Muñoz de la Nava	2	4
(Slovakia) F Horanský	6	6
(Spain) S Gutiérrez Ferrol	6	3
(Serbia) M Zekić	2	0^{r}
WC	(Slovakia) L Klein	4	1^{r}
2	(Norway) C Ruud	6	1

Second round
6	(Hungary) A Balázs	6	6
(Czech Republic) V Šafránek	1	0
WC	(Slovakia) A Glváč	2	0
3	(Czech Republic) A Pavlásek	6	6
(Belgium) A De Greef	7^{7}	6
(Slovakia) F Horanský	6^{2}	3
(Spain) S Gutiérrez Ferrol	6	6
2	(Norway) C Ruud	4	1

Quarterfinals
6	(Hungary) A Balázs	6	6
3	(Czech Republic) A Pavlásek	2	4
(Belgium) A De Greef	6	7
(Spain) S Gutiérrez Ferrol	2	5

Semifinals
6	(Hungary) A Balázs	1	3
(Belgium) A De Greef	6	6
