= 2017 Poprad-Tatry ATP Challenger Tour =

- Date: 19–24 June
- Edition: 3rd
- Draw: 32S / 16D
- Surface: Clay
- Location: Poprad, Slovakia

Champions

Singles
- (Germany) Cedrik-Marcel Stebe

Doubles
- (Poland) Mateusz Kowalczyk / (Germany) Andreas Mies
← 2016 ·	Poprad-Tatry ATP Challenger Tour	· 2018 →

The 2017 Poprad-Tatry ATP Challenger Tour was a professional tennis tournament played on clay courts. It was the third edition of the tournament which was part of the 2017 ATP Challenger Tour. It took place in Poprad, Slovakia between 19 and 24 June 2017.

== Singles main-draw entrants ==
=== Seeds ===
Country	Player	Rank^{1}	Seed
SVK	Martin Kližan	45	1
COL	Santiago Giraldo	99	2
SRB	Laslo Đere	124	3
BLR	Uladzimir Ignatik	131	4
SVK	Andrej Martin	132	5
ESP	Roberto Carballés Baena	137	6
CZE	Adam Pavlásek	140	7
SRB	Filip Krajinović	186	8

- ^{1} Rankings are as of 12 June 2017.

=== Other entrants ===
The following players received wildcards into the singles main draw:

- (Slovakia) Martin Kližan
- (Slovakia) Alex Molčan
- (Slovakia) Dominik Šproch
- (Slovakia) Péter Vajda

The following players received entry from the qualifying draw:

- (Serbia) Nikola Čačić
- (Slovakia) Filip Horanský
- (Switzerland) Luca Margaroli
- (Austria) Dennis Novak

== Champions ==
=== Singles ===
- (Germany) Cedrik-Marcel Stebe def. (Serbia) Laslo Đere 6–0, 6–3.

=== Doubles ===
- (Poland) Mateusz Kowalczyk / (Germany) Andreas Mies def. (Switzerland) Luca Margaroli / (Austria) Tristan-Samuel Weissborn 6–3, 7–6^{(7–3)}.
