= 2016 Poprad-Tatry ATP Challenger Tour – Singles =

Singles
- 2016 Poprad-Tatry ATP Challenger Tour

Final
- Champion: (Argentina) Horacio Zeballos
- Runner-up: (Austria) Gerald Melzer
- Score: 6–3, 6–4

Events
Singles	Doubles
- Poprad-Tatry ATP Challenger Tour

Adam Pavlásek was the defending champion but lost in the quarterfinals to Martin Kližan.

Horacio Zeballos won the title after defeating Gerald Melzer 6–3, 6–4 in the final.

== Seeds ==
1. (Slovakia) Martin Kližan (semifinals)
2. (Argentina) Horacio Zeballos (champion)
3. (Russia) Karen Khachanov (withdrew)
4. (Slovakia) Andrej Martin (semifinals)
5. (Czech Republic) Adam Pavlásek (quarterfinals)
6. (Austria) Gerald Melzer (final)
7. (Slovakia) Jozef Kovalík (quarterfinals)
8. (Argentina) Facundo Argüello (first round)
9. (Brazil) André Ghem (second round)

== Draw ==
Key

- Q = Qualifier
- WC = Wild card
- LL = Lucky loser
- Alt = Alternate
- ITF = ITF entry
- PR = Protected ranking
- SR = Special ranking
- SE = Special exempt
- JE = Junior exempt
- JR = Junior Accelerator Programme entrant
- CO = College Accelerator Programme entrant
- NG = Next Gen Accelerator Program entrant
- w/o = Walkover
- r = Retired
- d = Defaulted

=== Finals ===
Semifinals
1/WC	(Slovakia) Martin Kližan	3	7	4
6	(Austria) Gerald Melzer	6	5	6
4	(Slovakia) Andrej Martin	3	3
2	(Argentina) Horacio Zeballos	6	6

Final
6	(Austria) Gerald Melzer	3	4
2	(Argentina) Horacio Zeballos	6	6

=== Top half ===
First round
1/WC	(Slovakia) M Kližan	3	6	6
Q	(Croatia) N Mektić	6	3	3
Q	(Ukraine) V Sachko	6	3	5
(Spain) O Roca Batalla	4	6	7
WC	(Slovakia) L Klein	3	3
(Czech Republic) Robin Staněk	6	6
(Kazakhstan) A Golubev	5	3
5	(Czech Republic) A Pavlásek	7	6
9	(Brazil) A Ghem	6	6
(Chile) H Podlipnik	3	3
WC	(Slovakia) Patrik Fabian	3	3
(Spain) R Ramírez Hidalgo	6	6
(Slovakia) N Gombos	6	6
(Argentina) T Lipovšek Puches	2	4
Q	(Czech Republic) J Mertl	1	2
6	(Austria) G Melzer	6	6

Second round
1/WC	(Slovakia) M Kližan	6	6
(Spain) O Roca Batalla	1	0
(Czech Republic) R Staněk	4	4
5	(Czech Republic) A Pavlásek	6	6
9	(Brazil) A Ghem	6	1	1
(Spain) R Ramírez Hidalgo	4	6	6
(Slovakia) N Gombos	4	4
6	(Austria) G Melzer	6	6

Quarterfinals
1/WC	(Slovakia) M Kližan	6	0	6
5	(Czech Republic) A Pavlásek	3	6	4
(Spain) R Ramírez Hidalgo	2	2
6	(Austria) G Melzer	6	6

Semifinals
1/WC	(Slovakia) M Kližan	3	7	4
6	(Austria) G Melzer	6	5	6

=== Bottom half ===
First round
8	(Argentina) F Argüello	7^{7}	2	4
(Belgium) K Coppejans	6^{4}	6	6
(Czech Republic) M Michalička	6	6
LL	(Romania) D Dima	3	3
Q	(Germany) M Marterer	4	6^{6}
(Austria) D Novak	6	7^{8}
(Germany) N Langer	5	7^{7}	2
4	(Slovakia) A Martin	7	6^{2}	6
7	(Slovakia) J Kovalík	7^{7}	3	6
(Belgium) J De Loore	6^{4}	6	4
SE	(Ecuador) E Gómez	3	2
(Egypt) M Safwat	6	6
(Belarus) U Ignatik	6	6
WC	(Slovakia) Dominik Šproch	2	2
(Czech Republic) J Šátral	2	1
2	(Argentina) H Zeballos	6	6

Second round
(Belgium) K Coppejans	6	6
(Czech Republic) M Michalička	1	4
(Austria) D Novak	2	5
4	(Slovakia) A Martin	6	7
7	(Slovakia) J Kovalík	6	7^{7}
(Egypt) M Safwat	3	6^{3}
(Belarus) U Ignatik	2	4
2	(Argentina) H Zeballos	6	6

Quarterfinals
(Belgium) K Coppejans	7	3	5
4	(Slovakia) A Martin	5	6	7
7	(Slovakia) J Kovalík	6^{4}	6^{2}
2	(Argentina) H Zeballos	7^{7}	7^{7}

Semifinals
4	(Slovakia) A Martin	3	3
2	(Argentina) H Zeballos	6	6
