= 2018 Poprad-Tatry ATP Challenger Tour =

- Date: 18–23 June
- Edition: 4th
- Draw: 32S / 16D
- Surface: Clay
- Location: Poprad, Slovakia

Champions

Singles
- (Slovakia) Jozef Kovalík

Doubles
- (Bosnia and Herzegovina) Tomislav Brkić / (Croatia) Ante Pavić
← 2017 ·	Poprad-Tatry ATP Challenger Tour

The 2018 Poprad-Tatry ATP Challenger Tour was a professional tennis tournament played on clay courts. It was the fourth edition of the tournament which was part of the 2018 ATP Challenger Tour. It took place in Poprad, Slovakia between 18 and 23 June 2018.

== Singles main-draw entrants ==
=== Seeds ===
Country	Player	Rank^{1}	Seed
AUT	Gerald Melzer	109	1
NOR	Casper Ruud	137	2
CZE	Adam Pavlásek	147	3
SVK	Jozef Kovalík	149	4
EGY	Mohamed Safwat	166	5
HUN	Attila Balázs	202	6
AUT	Dennis Novak	209	7
BLR	Uladzimir Ignatik	213	8

- ^{1} Rankings are as of 11 June 2018.

=== Other entrants ===
The following players received wildcards into the singles main draw:

- (Slovakia) Andrej Glváč
- (Slovakia) Lukáš Klein
- (Slovakia) Dominik Šproch
- (Slovakia) Peter Vajda

The following players received entry from the qualifying draw:

- (Canada) Frank Dancevic
- (Austria) Andreas Haider-Maurer
- (Czech Republic) Pavel Nejedlý
- (Czech Republic) Jan Šátral

== Champions ==
=== Singles ===
- (Slovakia) Jozef Kovalík def. (Belgium) Arthur De Greef 6–4, 6–0.

=== Doubles ===
- (Bosnia and Herzegovina) Tomislav Brkić / (Croatia) Ante Pavić def. (Serbia) Nikola Čačić / (Switzerland) Luca Margaroli 6–3, 4–6, [16–14].
