= 2015 Poprad-Tatry ATP Challenger Tour – Singles =

Singles
- 2015 Poprad-Tatry ATP Challenger Tour

Final
- Champions: (Czech Republic) Adam Pavlásek
- Runners-up: (Chile) Hans Podlipnik Castillo
- Score: 6–2, 3–6, 6–3

Events
Singles	Doubles
- Poprad-Tatry ATP Challenger Tour

This was the first edition of the tournament.

Adam Pavlásek won the tournament, defeating Hans Podlipnik Castillo in the final, 6–2, 3–6, 6–3.

== Seeds ==
1. (Slovenia) Blaž Kavčič (first round)
2. (Kazakhstan) Aleksandr Nedovyesov (first round, retired)
3. (Argentina) Facundo Argüello (first round)
4. (Brazil) André Ghem (semifinals)
5. (Slovakia) Norbert Gombos (semifinals)
6. (Austria) Gerald Melzer (second round)
7. (Slovakia) Jozef Kovalík (first round)
8. (Belarus) Uladzimir Ignatik (quarterfinals, retired)

== Draw ==
Key

- Q = Qualifier
- WC = Wild card
- LL = Lucky loser
- Alt = Alternate
- ITF = ITF entry
- PR = Protected ranking
- SR = Special ranking
- SE = Special exempt
- JE = Junior exempt
- JR = Junior Accelerator Programme entrant
- CO = College Accelerator Programme entrant
- NG = Next Gen Accelerator Program entrant
- w/o = Walkover
- r = Retired
- d = Defaulted

=== Finals ===
Semifinals
(Chile) Hans Podlipnik Castillo	6	1	6
5	(Slovakia) Norbert Gombos	4	6	2
4	(Brazil) André Ghem	3	4
(Czech Republic) Adam Pavlásek	6	6

Final
(Chile) Hans Podlipnik Castillo	2	6	3
(Czech Republic) Adam Pavlásek	6	2	6

=== Top half ===
First round
1	(Slovenia) B Kavčič	3	4
(Chile) H Podlipnik Castillo	6	6
WC	(Serbia) D Djokovic	3	2
WC	(Slovakia) Péter Vajda	6	6
(Slovakia) I Klec	4	3
(Spain) P Riba	6	6
(Serbia) P Krstin	3	6	6^{2}
8	(Belarus) U Ignatik	6	4	7^{7}
3	(Argentina) F Argüello	7^{7}	4	5
(Czech Republic) M Michalička	6^{3}	6	7
(Germany) P Torebko	0	6	6
Q	(Argentina) T Lipovšek Puches	6	3	1
(Slovakia) A Martin	2
Q	(Poland) K Majchrzak	0^{r}
(Austria) D Novak	4	4
5	(Slovakia) N Gombos	6	6

Second round
(Chile) H Podlipnik Castillo	6	6
WC	(Slovakia) P Vajda	4	0
(Spain) P Riba	2	7^{8}	3
8	(Belarus) U Ignatik	6	6^{6}	6
(Czech Republic) M Michalička	6	5	6^{7}
(Germany) P Torebko	4	7	7^{9}
(Slovakia) A Martin	6	3	4
5	(Slovakia) N Gombos	3	6	6

Quarterfinals
(Chile) H Podlipnik Castillo	5
8	(Belarus) U Ignatik	2^{r}
(Germany) P Torebko	6	5	2
5	(Slovakia) N Gombos	3	7	6

Semifinals
(Chile) H Podlipnik Castillo	6	1	6
5	(Slovakia) N Gombos	4	6	2

=== Bottom half ===
First round
6	(Austria) G Melzer	6	7
Q	(Croatia) T Androić	4	5
(Chile) JC Sáez	5	2
(Croatia) A Veić	7	6
WC	(Slovakia) J Šimčák	2	6	3
(Slovakia) F Horanský	6	2	6
(Czech Republic) J Mertl	2	2
4	(Brazil) A Ghem	6	6
7	(Slovakia) J Kovalík	6	3	2
Q	(Czech Republic) J Šátral	4	6	6
(Brazil) F de Paula	6	6
WC	(Slovakia) Dominik Šproch	1	4
(Czech Republic) D Lojda	3	6	2
(Italy) R Bellotti	6	3	6
(Czech Republic) A Pavlásek	7	3
2	(Kazakhstan) A Nedovyesov	5	0^{r}

Second round
6	(Austria) G Melzer	6^{5}	3
(Croatia) A Veić	7^{7}	6
(Slovakia) F Horanský	2	1
4	(Brazil) A Ghem	6	6
Q	(Czech Republic) J Šátral	6	6
(Brazil) F de Paula	4	3
(Italy) R Bellotti	3	6^{4}
(Czech Republic) A Pavlásek	6	7^{7}

Quarterfinals
(Croatia) A Veić	2	6	3
4	(Brazil) A Ghem	6	1	6
Q	(Czech Republic) J Šátral	1	6	1
(Czech Republic) A Pavlásek	6	4	6

Semifinals
4	(Brazil) A Ghem	3	4
(Czech Republic) A Pavlásek	6	6
