= 2017 Poprad-Tatry ATP Challenger Tour – Doubles =

Doubles
- 2017 Poprad-Tatry ATP Challenger Tour

Final
- Champions: (Poland) Mateusz Kowalczyk (Germany) Andreas Mies
- Runners-up: (Switzerland) Luca Margaroli (Austria) Tristan-Samuel Weissborn
- Score: 6–3, 7–6^{(7–3)}

Events
Singles	Doubles
← 2016 ·	Poprad-Tatry ATP Challenger Tour	· 2018 →

Ariel Behar and Andrey Golubev were the defending champions but only Behar chose to defend his title, partnering Aliaksandr Bury. Behar lost in the quarterfinals to Victor Vlad Cornea and Zdeněk Kolář.

Mateusz Kowalczyk and Andreas Mies won the title after defeating Luca Margaroli and Tristan-Samuel Weissborn 6–3, 7–6^{(7–3)} in the final.

== Seeds ==
1. (Russia) Mikhail Elgin / (Ukraine) Denys Molchanov (quarterfinals)
2. (Uruguay) Ariel Behar / (Belarus) Aliaksandr Bury (quarterfinals)
3. (Switzerland) Luca Margaroli / (Austria) Tristan-Samuel Weissborn (final)
4. (Poland) Mateusz Kowalczyk / (Germany) Andreas Mies (champions)

== Draw ==
=== Key ===
- Q = Qualifier
- WC = Wild card
- LL = Lucky loser
- Alt = Alternate
- SE = Special exempt
- PR = Protected ranking
- ITF = ITF entry
- JE = Junior exempt
- w/o = Walkover
- r = Retired
- d = Defaulted
- SR = Special ranking

First round
1	(Russia) M Elgin (Ukraine) D Molchanov	6	6
Alt	(Russia) B Bobrov (Ukraine) Vadym Ursu	0	1
(South Africa) R Roelofse (Indonesia) C Rungkat	1	5
(Sweden) I Arvidsson (Sweden) F Simonsson	6	7
4	(Poland) M Kowalczyk (Germany) A Mies	6	6
(Argentina) F Coria (Argentina) A Velotti	2	2
WC	(Slovakia) Tomáš Líška (Slovakia) A Martin	6	4	[8]
(Serbia) N Čačić (Serbia) F Krajinović	4	6	[10]
WC	(Slovakia) A Molčan (Slovakia) Patrik Néma	1	4
(Australia) C O'Connell (Serbia) D Petrović	6	6
(Belarus) U Ignatik (Czech Republic) Petr Michnev	5	4
3	(Switzerland) L Margaroli (Austria) T-S Weissborn	7	6
WC	(Slovakia) F Horanský (Slovakia) Dominik Šproch	3	2
(Romania) VV Cornea (Czech Republic) Z Kolář	6	6
(Italy) R Bellotti (Austria) S Ofner	3	3
2	(Uruguay) A Behar (Belarus) A Bury	6	6

Quarterfinals
1	(Russia) M Elgin (Ukraine) D Molchanov	6	5	[6]
(Sweden) I Arvidsson (Sweden) F Simonsson	4	7	[10]
4	(Poland) M Kowalczyk (Germany) A Mies	2	6	[10]
(Serbia) N Čačić (Serbia) F Krajinović	6	4	[8]
(Australia) C O'Connell (Serbia) D Petrović	4	4
3	(Switzerland) L Margaroli (Austria) T-S Weissborn	6	6
(Romania) VV Cornea (Czech Republic) Z Kolář	4	6	[10]
2	(Uruguay) A Behar (Belarus) A Bury	6	4	[5]

Semifinals
(Sweden) I Arvidsson (Sweden) F Simonsson	2	5
4	(Poland) M Kowalczyk (Germany) A Mies	6	7
3	(Switzerland) L Margaroli (Austria) T-S Weissborn	6	7^{7}
(Romania) VV Cornea (Czech Republic) Z Kolář	3	6^{5}

Final
4	(Poland) M Kowalczyk (Germany) A Mies	6	7^{7}
3	(Switzerland) L Margaroli (Austria) T-S Weissborn	3	6^{3}
