= 2015 Poprad-Tatry ATP Challenger Tour =

- Date: 15–22 June
- Edition: 1st
- Draw: 32S / 16D
- Prize money: €42,500 +H
- Surface: Clay
- Location: Poprad, Slovakia

Champions

Singles
- (Czech Republic) Adam Pavlásek

Doubles
- (Czech Republic) Roman Jebavý / (Czech Republic) Jan Šátral
Poprad-Tatry ATP Challenger Tour	· 2016 →

The 2015 Poprad-Tatry ATP Challenger Tour was a professional tennis tournament played on clay courts. It was the 1st edition of the tournament which was part of the 2015 ATP Challenger Tour. It took place in Poprad, Slovakia between 15 and 22 June 2015.

== Singles main-draw entrants ==
=== Seeds ===
Country	Player	Rank^{1}	Seed
SLO	Blaž Kavčič	77	1
KAZ	Aleksandr Nedovyesov	123	2
ARG	Facundo Argüello	133	3
BRA	André Ghem	135	4
SVK	Norbert Gombos	137	5
AUT	Gerald Melzer	167	6
SVK	Jozef Kovalík	190	7
BLR	Uladzimir Ignatik	204	8

- ^{1} Rankings are as of June 8, 2015.

=== Other entrants ===
The following players received wildcards into the singles main draw:

- (Serbia) Djordje Djokovic
- (Slovakia) Juraj Šimčák
- (Slovakia) Dominik Šproch
- (Slovakia) Péter Vajda

The following players received entry from the qualifying draw:

- (Croatia) Toni Androić
- (Argentina) Tomás Lipovšek Puches
- (Poland) Kamil Majchrzak
- (Czech Republic) Jan Šátral

== Doubles main-draw entrants ==
=== Seeds ===
Country	Player	Country	Player	Rank^{1}	Seed
GER	Gero Kretschmer	GER	Alexander Satschko	196	1
POL	Mateusz Kowalczyk	SVK	Igor Zelenay	202	2
VEN	Roberto Maytín	MEX	Miguel Ángel Reyes-Varela	217	3
BLR	Aliaksandr Bury	POL	Andriej Kapaś	293	4

- ^{1} Rankings as of June 8, 2015.

=== Other entrants ===
The following pairs received wildcards into the doubles main draw:

- (Italy) Riccardo Bellotti / (Austria) Dennis Novak
- (Serbia) Djordje Djokovic / (Slovakia) Péter Vajda
- (Slovakia) Juraj Šimčák / (Slovakia) Dominik Šproch

== Champions ==
=== Singles ===
- (Czech Republic) Adam Pavlásek def. (Chile) Hans Podlipnik Castillo 6–2, 3–6, 6–3

=== Doubles ===
- (Czech Republic) Roman Jebavý / (Czech Republic) Jan Šátral def. (Slovakia) Norbert Gombos / (Czech Republic) Adam Pavlásek 6–2, 6–2
