= 2015 Poprad-Tatry ATP Challenger Tour – Doubles =

Doubles
- 2015 Poprad-Tatry ATP Challenger Tour

Final
- Champions: (Czech Republic) Roman Jebavý; (Czech Republic) Jan Šátral
- Runners-up: (Slovakia) Norbert Gombos; (Czech Republic) Adam Pavlásek
- Score: 6–2, 6–2

Events
Singles	Doubles
- Poprad-Tatry ATP Challenger Tour

This was the first edition of the tournament.

Roman Jebavý and Jan Šátral won the tournament, defeating Norbert Gombos and Adam Pavlásek in the final, 6–2, 6–2.

== Seeds ==
1. (Germany) Gero Kretschmer / (Germany) Alexander Satschko (semifinals)
2. (Poland) Mateusz Kowalczyk / (Slovakia) Igor Zelenay (first round)
3. (Venezuela) Roberto Maytín / (Mexico) Miguel Ángel Reyes-Varela (first round)
4. (Belarus) Aliaksandr Bury / (Poland) Andriej Kapaś (first round)

== Draw ==
Key

- Q = Qualifier
- WC = Wild card
- LL = Lucky loser
- Alt = Alternate
- ITF = ITF entry
- PR = Protected ranking
- SR = Special ranking
- SE = Special exempt
- JE = Junior exempt
- JR = Junior Accelerator Programme entrant
- CO = College Accelerator Programme entrant
- NG = Next Gen Accelerator Program entrant
- w/o = Walkover
- r = Retired
- d = Defaulted

=== Draw ===
First round

Quarterfinals

Semifinals

Final

1
- (Germany) G Kretschmer
- (Germany) A Satschko
5
6
[10]

- (Slovakia) A Martin
- (Chile) H Podlipnik Castillo
7
4
[7]

1
- (Germany) G Kretschmer
- (Germany) A Satschko
6
6

- (Brazil) F de Paula
- (Chile) JC Sáez
4
6
[10]

- (Brazil) F de Paula
- (Chile) JC Sáez
1
3

WC
(Slovakia) Juraj Šimčák
(Slovakia) Dominik Šproch
6
2
[8]

1
- (Germany) G Kretschmer
- (Germany) A Satschko
6
4
[6]

3
- (Venezuela) R Maytín
- (Mexico) MÁ Reyes-Varela
4
1

- (Czech Republic) R Jebavý
- (Czech Republic) J Šátral
2
6
[10]

- (Czech Republic) R Jebavý
- (Czech Republic) J Šátral
6
6

- (Czech Republic) R Jebavý
- (Czech Republic) J Šátral
6
7^{7}

- (Argentina) F Argüello
- (Argentina) T Lipovšek Puches
6
6

- (Argentina) F Argüello
- (Argentina) T Lipovšek Puches
3
6^{4}

- (Brazil) A Ghem
- (Austria) G Melzer
4
1

- (Czech Republic) R Jebavý
- (Czech Republic) J Šátral
6
6

WC
- (Italy) R Bellotti
- (Austria) D Novak
2
3

- (Slovakia) N Gombos
- (Czech Republic) A Pavlásek
2
2

- (Belarus) U Ignatik
- (Czech Republic) D Lojda
6
6

- (Belarus) U Ignatik
- (Czech Republic) D Lojda
w/o

- (Slovakia) N Gombos
- (Czech Republic) A Pavlásek
6
4
[10]

- (Slovakia) N Gombos
- (Czech Republic) A Pavlásek

4
- (Belarus) A Bury
- (Poland) A Kapaś
2
6
[5]

- (Slovakia) N Gombos
- (Czech Republic) A Pavlásek
7^{7}
7^{8}

WC
(Serbia) D Djokovic
(Slovakia) Péter Vajda
1
1

- (Slovakia) J Kovalík
- (Czech Republic) J Mertl
6^{4}
6^{6}

- (Slovakia) I Klec
- (Kazakhstan) A Nedovyesov
6
6

- (Slovakia) I Klec
- (Kazakhstan) A Nedovyesov
2
2

- (Slovakia) J Kovalík
- (Czech Republic) J Mertl
4
6
[10]

- (Slovakia) J Kovalík
- (Czech Republic) J Mertl
6
6

2
- (Poland) M Kowalczyk
- (Slovakia) I Zelenay
6
3
[7]
