= 2018 Poprad-Tatry ATP Challenger Tour – Doubles =

Doubles
- 2018 Poprad-Tatry ATP Challenger Tour

Final
- Champions: (Bosnia and Herzegovina) Tomislav Brkić (Croatia) Ante Pavić
- Runners-up: (Serbia) Nikola Čačić (Switzerland) Luca Margaroli
- Score: 6–3, 4–6, [16–14]

Events
Singles	Doubles
- Poprad-Tatry ATP Challenger Tour

Mateusz Kowalczyk and Andreas Mies were the defending champions but chose not to defend their title.

Tomislav Brkić and Ante Pavić won the title after defeating Nikola Čačić and Luca Margaroli 6–3, 4–6, [16–14] in the final.

== Seeds ==
1. (Czech Republic) Roman Jebavý / (Czech Republic) Zdeněk Kolář (quarterfinals)
2. (United States) Nathan Pasha / (United States) Hunter Reese (first round)
3. (Poland) Tomasz Bednarek / (Poland) Szymon Walków (first round)
4. (United States) Robert Galloway / (Brazil) Fernando Romboli (semifinals)

== Draw ==
Key

- Q = Qualifier
- WC = Wild card
- LL = Lucky loser
- Alt = Alternate
- ITF = ITF entry
- PR = Protected ranking
- SR = Special ranking
- SE = Special exempt
- JE = Junior exempt
- JR = Junior Accelerator Programme entrant
- CO = College Accelerator Programme entrant
- NG = Next Gen Accelerator Program entrant
- w/o = Walkover
- r = Retired
- d = Defaulted

First round
1	(Czech Republic) R Jebavý (Czech Republic) Z Kolář	6	6
(Spain) D Muñoz de la Nava (Italy) M Viola	3	4
Alt	(Spain) S Gutiérrez Ferrol (Czech Republic) D Poljak	1	6	[7]
(Serbia) N Čačić (Switzerland) L Margaroli	6	3	[10]
3	(Poland) T Bednarek (Poland) S Walków	3	2
(Austria) M Neuchrist (Austria) T-S Weissborn	6	6
(Czech Republic) Marek Jaloviec (Czech Republic) V Šafránek	3	1
WC	(Slovakia) F Polášek (Czech Republic) P Rikl	6	6
(Croatia) I Sabanov (Croatia) M Sabanov	6^{4}	6	[10]
WC	(Slovakia) Andrej Glváč (Slovakia) Peter Vajda	7^{7}	4	[5]
(Ukraine) A Smirnov (Ukraine) V Uzhylovskyi	2	5
4	(United States) R Galloway (Brazil) F Romboli	6	7
(Bosnia and Herzegovina) T Brkić (Croatia) A Pavić	6	4	[12]
WC	(Slovakia) I Klec (Slovakia) Dominik Šproch	0	6	[10]
(Belgium) N Desein (Austria) G Melzer	6	6
2	(United States) N Pasha (United States) H Reese	4	4

Quarterfinals
1	(Czech Republic) R Jebavý (Czech Republic) Z Kolář	6^{6}	6	[9]
(Serbia) N Čačić (Switzerland) L Margaroli	7^{8}	3	[11]
(Austria) M Neuchrist (Austria) T-S Weissborn	6	6
WC	(Slovakia) F Polášek (Czech Republic) P Rikl	4	3
(Croatia) I Sabanov (Croatia) M Sabanov	4	2
4	(United States) R Galloway (Brazil) F Romboli	6	6
(Bosnia and Herzegovina) T Brkić (Croatia) A Pavić	w/o
(Belgium) N Desein (Austria) G Melzer

Semifinals
(Serbia) N Čačić (Switzerland) L Margaroli	6	7^{7}
(Austria) M Neuchrist (Austria) T-S Weissborn	2	6^{2}
4	(United States) R Galloway (Brazil) F Romboli	6^{2}	3
(Bosnia and Herzegovina) T Brkić (Croatia) A Pavić	7^{7}	6

Final
(Serbia) N Čačić (Switzerland) L Margaroli	3	6	[14]
(Bosnia and Herzegovina) T Brkić (Croatia) A Pavić	6	4	[16]
