= 2016 Poprad-Tatry ATP Challenger Tour =

- Date: 13–18 June
- Edition: 2nd
- Draw: 32S / 16D
- Prize money: €42,500 +H
- Surface: Clay
- Location: Poprad, Slovakia

Champions

Singles
- (Argentina) Horacio Zeballos

Doubles
- (Uruguay) Ariel Behar / (Kazakhstan) Andrey Golubev
- Poprad-Tatry ATP Challenger Tour

The 2016 Poprad-Tatry ATP Challenger Tour was a professional tennis tournament played on clay courts. It was the second edition of the tournament which was part of the 2016 ATP Challenger Tour. It took place in Poprad, Slovakia between 13 and 18 June 2016.

== Singles main-draw entrants ==
=== Seeds ===
Country	Player	Rank^{1}	Seed
SVK	Martin Kližan	51	1
ARG	Horacio Zeballos	92	2
RUS	~~Karen Khachanov~~	~~98~~	3
SVK	Andrej Martin	110	4
CZE	Adam Pavlásek	114	5
AUT	Gerald Melzer	122	6
SVK	Jozef Kovalík	134	7
ARG	Facundo Argüello	173	8
BRA	André Ghem	188	9

- ^{1} Rankings are as of June 6, 2016.

=== Other entrants ===
The following players received wildcards into the singles main draw:

- (Slovakia) Patrik Fabian
- (Slovakia) Lukáš Klein
- (Slovakia) Martin Kližan
- (Slovakia) Dominik Šproch

The following player received entry into the singles main draw as a special exempt:

- (Ecuador) Emilio Gómez

The following players received entry from the qualifying draw:

- (Germany) Maximilian Marterer
- (Croatia) Nikola Mektić
- (Czech Republic) Jan Mertl
- (Ukraine) Vitaliy Sachko

The following players received entry as a lucky loser:

- (Romania) Dragoș Dima

== Champions ==
=== Singles ===
- (Argentina) Horacio Zeballos def. (Austria) Gerald Melzer, 6–3, 6–4

=== Doubles ===
- (Uruguay) Ariel Behar / (Kazakhstan) Andrey Golubev def. (Czech Republic) Lukáš Dlouhý / (Slovakia) Andrej Martin, 6–2, 5–7, [10–5]
