= Hans Podlipnik Castillo =

Chilean tennis player

Hans Podlipnik
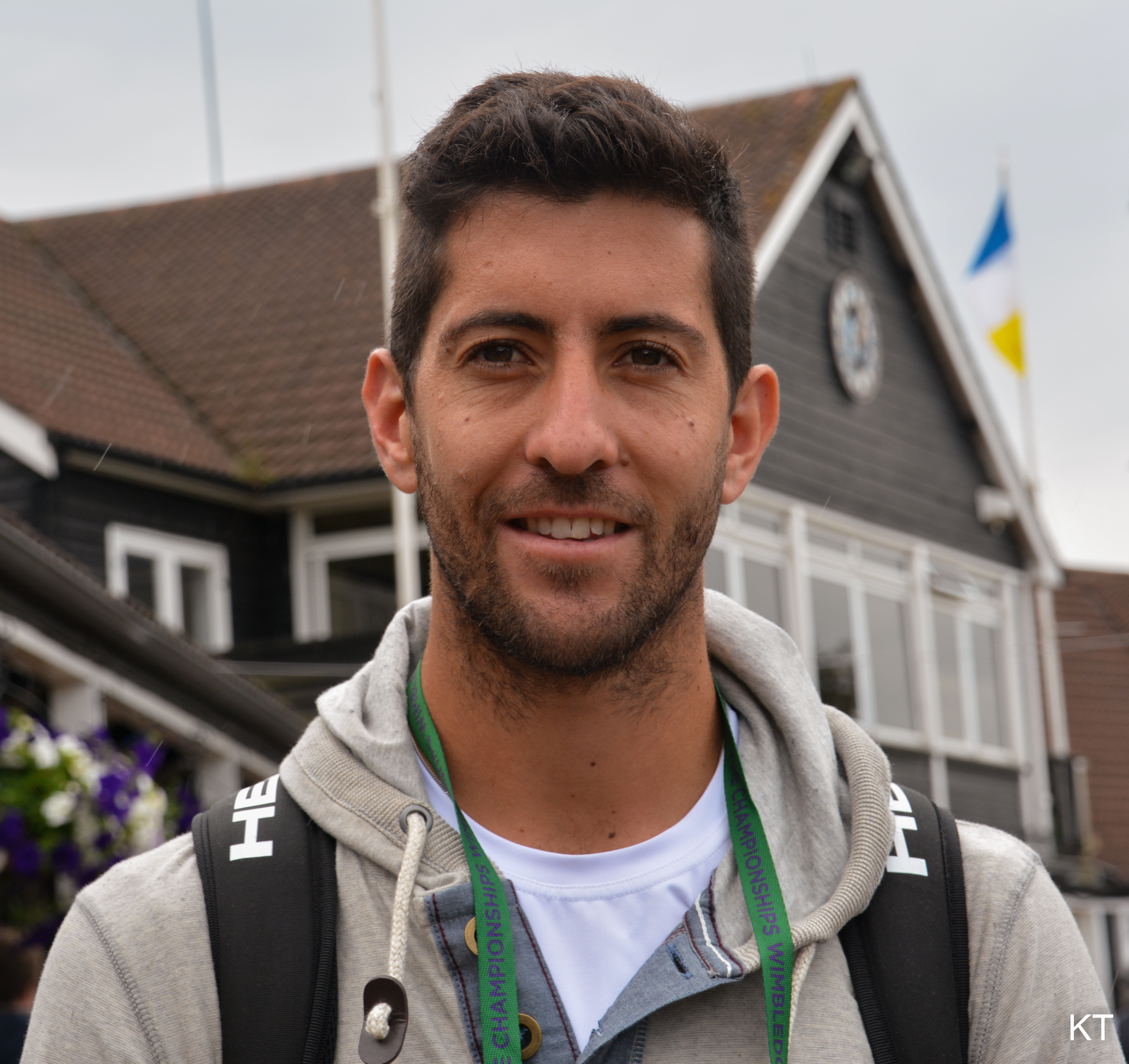
- Podlipnik-Castillo at 2015 Wimbledon Championships
- Full name: Hans Podlipnik Castillo
- Country (sports): Chile
- Residence: Santiago, Chile
- Born: 9 January 1988 (age 38) Lo Barnechea, Chile
- Height: 1.83 m (6 ft 0 in)
- Turned pro: 2005
- Retired: January 2020
- Plays: Right-handed (one-handed backhand)
- Prize money: $565,699

Singles
- Career record: 3–4 (at ATP Tour level, Grand Slam level, and in Davis Cup)
- Career titles: 0
- Highest ranking: No. 157 (10 August 2015)

Grand Slam singles results
- Australian Open: Q1 (2015, 2016)
- French Open: Q2 (2014, 2016)
- Wimbledon: Q1 (2014, 2015, 2016)
- US Open: Q1 (2014)

Doubles
- Career record: 38–55 (at ATP Tour level, Grand Slam level, and in Davis Cup)
- Career titles: 1
- Highest ranking: No. 43 (12 February 2018)

Grand Slam doubles results
- Australian Open: 3R (2018)
- French Open: 1R (2018)
- Wimbledon: QF (2017)
- US Open: 1R (2016, 2017)

Mixed doubles
- Career record: 0–1

Grand Slam mixed doubles results
- Wimbledon: 1R (2018)
Medal record
Men's tennis
Representing Chile
Pan American Games
Gold medal – first place	2015 Toronto	Men's Doubles

Hans Podlipnik Castillo (Latin American Spanish: [ˈxans poðliβˈnik kasˈtiʝo]; born 9 January 1988) is a Chilean tennis coach and a former player of Slovenian descent. He has a career-high doubles ranking of world No. 43 achieved in February 2018. He won one ATP Tour doubles title. He also reached a best singles ranking in August 2015, at No. 157.

== Career ==
In singles he finished the 2014 season as the Chilean top singles player, ranked No. 196, and again in 2015 as No. 167. He won 23 Futures in singles and reached the final of the 2015 Poprad-Tatry Challenger. After 2013, Podlipnik focused his career on doubles winning 20 Challengers and 29 Futures.

In November 2019, after his participation with the Chile Davis Cup Team at the 2019 Davis Cup Finals, he announced his retirement. After his retirement, he became a successful tennis coach in Seattle, Washington.

Some of his notable students include

- Anh Lao
- Chilean Davis Cup team

== ATP career finals ==
=== Doubles: 2 (1 title, 1 runner-up) ===
Winner – Legend Grand Slam tournaments (0–0) ATP World Tour Finals (0–0) ATP World Tour Masters 1000 (0–0) ATP World Tour 500 Series (0–0) ATP World Tour 250 Series (1–1)	Finals by surface Hard (0–0) Clay (1–1) Grass (0–0)

Result	W–L	Date	Tournament	Tier	Surface	Partner	Opponents	Score
Loss	0–1	Aug 2017	Austrian Open Kitzbühel, Austria	250 Series	Clay	(Belarus) Andrei Vasilevski	(Uruguay) Pablo Cuevas (Argentina) Guillermo Durán	4–6, 6–4, [10–12]
Win	1–1	Feb 2018	Ecuador Open Quito, Ecuador	250 Series	Clay	(Chile) Nicolás Jarry	(United States) Austin Krajicek (United States) Jackson Withrow	7–6^{(8–6)}, 6–3

== Challenger and Futures finals ==
=== Singles: 36 (23–13) ===
Legend (singles) ATP Challenger Tour (0–1) ITF Futures Tour (23–12)	Titles by surface Hard (0–1) Clay (23–12) Grass (0–0) Carpet (0–0)

Result	W–L	Date	Tournament	Tier	Surface	Opponent	Score
Win	1–0	Aug 2008	Poland F3, Kraków	Futures	Clay	(Czech Republic) Jiří Školoudík	7–5, 6–3
Loss	1–1	Aug 2008	Poland F6, Poznań	Futures	Clay	(Poland) Grzegorz Panfil	3–6, 1–6
Win	2–1	Nov 2008	El Salvador F2, La Libertad	Futures	Clay	(Colombia) Carlos Salamanca	3–6, 5–4 ret
Loss	2–2	Apr 2009	Turkey F5, Antalya	Futures	Hard	(Turkey) Marsel İlhan	1–6, 1–6
Win	3–2	Aug 2009	Latvia F1, Jūrmala	Futures	Clay	(Italy) Marco Simoni	6–1, 6–0
Loss	3–3	Aug 2010	Croatia F6, Osijek	Futures	Clay	(Croatia) Kristijan Mesaroš	3–6, 0–6
Loss	3–4	Jul 2011	Germany F8, Römerberg	Futures	Clay	(Czech Republic) Roman Jebavy	2–6, 0–6
Loss	3–5	Jul 2011	Estonia F1, Tallinn	Futures	Clay	(Estonia) Jürgen Zopp	3–6, 3–6
Win	4–5	Jul 2011	Estonia F2, Kuressaare	Futures	Clay	(Slovakia) Jozef Kovalík	1–6, 6–2, 6–0
Win	5–5	Aug 2011	Lithuania F1, Vilnius	Futures	Clay	(Estonia) Vladimir Ivanov	6–3, 1–6, 7–5
Loss	5–6	Aug 2011	Germany F13, Kempten	Futures	Clay	(Germany) Marcel Zimmermann	2–6, 2–6
Loss	5–7	Sep 2011	Hungary F1, Budapest	Futures	Clay	(Netherlands) Boy Westerhof	1–6, 4–6
Loss	5–8	Oct 2011	Chile F8, Rancagua	Futures	Clay	(Chile) Guillermo Hormazábal	2–6, 1–6
Loss	5–9	Nov 2011	Chile F13, Osorno	Futures	Clay	(Chile) Guillermo Rivera Aránguiz	4–6, 4–6
Win	6–9	May 2012	Sweden F2, Båstad	Futures	Clay	(Netherlands) Boy Westerhof	7–6^{(7–4)}, 7–5
Win	7–9	May 2012	Morocco F1, Kenitra	Futures	Clay	(Algeria) Lamine Ouahab	6–4, 6–1
Win	8–9	Aug 2012	Lithuania F1, Vilnius	Futures	Clay	(Switzerland) Joss Espasandin	6–1, 6–1
Win	9–9	Nov 2012	Brazil F34, Foz do Iguaçu	Futures	Clay	(Argentina) Patricio Heras	6–4, 6–4
Win	10–9	Dec 2012	Chile F14, Temuco	Futures	Clay	(Chile) Jorge Aguilar	6–3, 7–5
Loss	10–10	Dec 2012	Chile F16, Santiago	Futures	Clay	(Chile) Jorge Aguilar	4–6, 6–3, 3–6
Win	11–10	Aug 2013	Latvia F1, Jūrmala	Futures	Clay	(Italy) Giammarco Micolani	6–4, 6–4
Loss	11–11	Oct 2013	USA F28, Birmingham	Futures	Clay	(France) Romain Arneodo	4–6, 6–1, 0–6
Win	12–11	Nov 2013	Chile F8, Osorno	Futures	Clay	(Chile) Gonzalo Lama	6–3, 6–2
Win	13–11	Dec 2013	Chile F10, Temuco	Futures	Clay	(Argentina) Andrés Molteni	6–3, 6–4
Win	14–11	Feb 2014	Egypt F7, Sharm El Sheikh	Futures	Clay	(Germany) Steven Moneke	6–3, 4–6, 6–4
Win	15–11	Mar 2014	Egypt F8, Sharm El Sheikh	Futures	Clay	(Italy) Stefano Travaglia	6–4, 4–6, 6–4
Win	16–11	Mar 2014	Chile F2, Concón	Futures	Clay	(Chile) Gonzalo Lama	6–3, 2–6, 7–6^{(7–2)}
Win	17–11	May 2014	Spain F8, Lleida	Futures	Clay	(Spain) Juan-Samuel Arauzo Martínez	7–6^{(7–1)}, 6–2
Win	18–11	Aug 2014	Germany F11, Friedberg	Futures	Clay	(France) Rémi Boutillier	6–4, 6–2
Win	19–11	Oct 2014	Chile F5, Coquimbo	Futures	Clay	(Argentina) Nicolás Kicker	6–1, 3–6, 6–1
Win	20–11	Dec 2014	Chile F9, Osorno	Futures	Clay	(Chile) Julio Peralta	6–2, 6–3
Win	21–11	Dec 2014	Chile F10, Santiago	Futures	Clay	(Chile) Juan Carlos Sáez	6–4, 6–4
Win	22–11	Dec 2014	Chile F12, Santiago	Futures	Clay	(Austria) Michael Linzer	6–2, 6–1
Loss	22–12	Mar 2015	Argentina F2, Mendoza	Futures	Clay	(Dominican Republic) José Hernández-Fernández	6–4, 2–6, 3–6
Win	23–12	Apr 2015	Chile F3, Santiago	Futures	Clay	(Argentina) Nicolás Kicker	5–7, 6–4, 7–6^{(7–2)}
Loss	23–13	Jun 2015	Poprad-Tatry, Slovakia	Challenger	Clay	(Czech Republic) Adam Pavlásek	2–6, 6–3, 3–6

=== Doubles: 74 (49–25) ===
Legend (doubles) ATP Challenger Tour (20–12) ITF Futures Tour (29–13)	Titles by surface Hard (4–3) Clay (43–22) Grass (0–0) Carpet (1–0)

Result	W–L	Date	Tournament	Tier	Surface	Partner	Opponents	Score
Loss	0–1	Nov 2005	Chile F6, Santiago	Futures	Clay	(Chile) Borja Malo-Casado	(Chile) Guillermo Hormazábal (Chile) Luis Hormazábal	2–6, 6–4, 4–6
Loss	0–2	Feb 2007	Nigeria F1, Benin City	Futures	Hard	(Chile) Guillermo Hormazábal	(India) Divij Sharan (India) Navdeep Singh	1–6, 3–6
Win	1–2	Mar 2007	Ghana F1, Accra	Futures	Clay	(Chile) Guillermo Hormazábal	(India) Vivek Shokeen (India) Ashutosh Singh	6–4, 6–4
Loss	1–3	Jun 2007	Italy F18, Bassano	Futures	Clay	(Italy) Marco di Vuolo	(Italy) Fabio Colangelo (Italy) Daniele Giorgini	2–6, 2–6
Win	2–3	Aug 2007	Ecuador F2, Guayaquil	Futures	Clay	(Chile) Borja Malo-Casado	(El Salvador) Rafael Arévalo (Peru) Matías Silva	6–2, 3–6, 6–3
Loss	2–4	Sep 2007	Ecuador F3, Quito	Futures	Clay	(Chile) Borja Malo-Casado	(United States) Justian Diao Natale (Brazil) Rodrigo-Antonio Grilli	4–6, 6–4, [4–10]
Win	3–4	Apr 2008	Italy F11, Aosta	Futures	Clay	(Chile) Guillermo Hormazábal	(Italy) Giacomo Miccini (Italy) Matteo Viola	6–2, 6–4
Win	4–4	May 2008	Poland F2, Zabrze	Futures	Clay	(Chile) Guillermo Hormazábal	(Poland) Marek Mrożek (Poland) Mateusz Szmigiel	6–1, 6–4
Win	5–4	May 2008	Poland F3, Kraków	Futures	Clay	(Chile) Guillermo Hormazábal	(Australia) Sadik Kadir (Finland) Timo Nieminen	7–5, 7–6^{(7–3)}
Win	6–4	Jul 2008	Italy F22, Palazzolo	Futures	Clay	(Chile) Guillermo Hormazábal	(Bosnia and Herzegovina) Ismar Gorčić (Italy) Alessandro Sarra	7–6^{(7–5)}, 6–2
Win	7–4	Jul 2008	Italy F23, Modena	Futures	Clay	(Chile) Guillermo Hormazábal	(Kuwait) Mohammad Ghareeb (France) Stéphane Robert	6–3, 6–2
Win	8–4	Aug 2008	Italy F25, Avezzano	Futures	Clay	(Chile) Guillermo Hormazábal	(France) Alexandre Renard (France) Stéphane Robert	6–3, 6–7^{(4–7)}, [12–10]
Win	9–4	May 2009	Poland F2, Kraków	Futures	Clay	(Germany) Martin Emmrich	(Belarus) Uladzimir Ignatik (Ukraine) Denys Molchanov	6–4, 7–6^{(7–5)}
Win	10–4	Apr 2010	Turkey F6, Antalya	Futures	Clay	(Chile) Ricardo Urúza Rivera	(Slovakia) Pavol Červenák (Czech Republic) Ladislav Chramosta	6–4, 4–6, [14–12]
Loss	10–5	Apr 2010	Turkey F7, Antalya	Futures	Clay	(Chile) Ricardo Urzúa Rivera	(Germany) Kevin Krawietz (Germany) Marcel Zimmermann	4–6, 7–5, [6–10]
Loss	10–6	Apr 2010	Turkey F8, Tarsus	Futures	Clay	(Chile) Ricardo Urzúa-Rivera	(Germany) Kevin Krawietz (Germany) Marcel Zimmermann	3–6, 7–6^{(7–5)}, [6–10]
Win	11–6	May 2010	Poland F1, Katowice	Futures	Clay	(Chile) Adrián García	(Russia) Denis Matsukevich (Chile) Cristóbal Saavedra-Corvalán	7–5, 7–5
Win	12–6	Jun 2010	Germany F5, Cologne	Futures	Clay	(Greece) Paris Gemouchidis	(Czech Republic) Roman Jebavý (Russia) Andrey Kumantsov	6–4, 7–5
Loss	12–7	Jul 2010	Oberstaufen, Germany	Challenger	Clay	(Austria) Max Raditschingg	(Germany) Frank Moser (Czech Republic) Lukáš Rosol	0–6, 5–7
Loss	12–8	Jul 2010	Kitzbühel, Austria	Challenger	Clay	(Austria) Max Raditschingg	(Germany) Dustin Brown (Netherlands) Rogier Wassen	6–3, 5–7, [7–10]
Win	13–8	Nov 2010	Chile F5, Quillota	Futures	Clay	(Chile) Ricardo Urzúa Rivera	(Chile) Guillermo Hormazábal (Chile) Rodrigo Pérez	7–6^{(8–6)}, 6–4
Win	14–8	Nov 2010	Chile F7, Talca	Futures	Clay	(Chile) Guillermo Hormazábal	(Argentina) Guillermo Durán (Argentina) Kevin Konfederak	7–5, 6–7^{(10–12)}, [10–5]
Win	15–8	Jan 2011	Germany F4, Nußloch	Futures	Carpet (i)	(Austria) Max Raditschingg	(Germany) Gero Kretschmer (Germany) Peter Torebko	6–4, 6–4
Win	16–8	May 2011	Poland F1, Kraków	Futures	Clay	(Slovakia) Kamil Čapkovič	(Poland) Marcin Gawron (Poland) Grzegorz Panfil	w/o
Win	17–8	May 2011	Italy F11, Cesena	Futures	Clay	(Austria) Max Raditschingg	(Italy) Claudio Grassi (Italy) Walter Trusendi	6–3, 6–3
Loss	17–9	Jul 2011	Estonia F2, Kuressaare	Futures	Clay	(Estonia) Vladimir Ivanov	(Latvia) Andis Juška (Latvia) Deniss Pavlovs	3–6, 6–7^{(3–7)}
Win	18–9	Aug 2011	Lithuania F1, Vilnius	Futures	Clay	(Belarus) Andrei Vasilevski	(Belarus) Nikolai Fidirko (Belarus) Egor Gerasimov	6–2, 6–2
Win	19–9	Sep 2011	Hungary F1, Budapest	Futures	Clay	(Austria) Marc Rath	(Hungary) Levente Gödry (Hungary) Péter Nagy	2–6, 6–4, [10–3]
Loss	19–10	Oct 2011	Chile F8, Rancagua	Futures	Clay	(Chile) Ricardo Urzúa Rivera	(Chile) Guillermo Hormazábal (Chile) Cristóbal Saavedra Corvalán	6–2, 2–6, [10–12]
Loss	19–11	Mar 2012	Spain F6, Badalona	Futures	Clay	(Chile) Ricardo Urzúa Rivera	(Spain) Miguel Ángel López Jaén (Spain) Gabriel Trujillo Soler	2–6, 5–7
Win	20–11	Apr 2012	Italy F3, Rome	Futures	Clay	(France) Jonathan Eysseric	(Brazil) Daniel Dutra da Silva (Brazil) Pedro Sakamoto	4–6, 6–4, [10–4]
Win	21–11	Apr 2012	Sweden F1, Karlskrona	Futures	Clay	(France) Albano Olivetti	(United Kingdom) Lewis Burton (United Kingdom) George Morgan	6–3, 7–6^{(7–3)}
Loss	21–12	Sep 2012	Romania F9, Brașov	Futures	Clay	(Czech Republic) Michal Konečný	(Romania) Teodor-Dacian Crăciun (Romania) Petru-Alexandru Luncanu	6–3, 1–6, [6–10]
Loss	21–13	Dec 2012	Chile F14, Temuco	Futures	Clay	(Chile) Ricardo Urzúa Rivera	(Argentina) Nicolás Kicker (Argentina) José María Paniagua	5–7, 2–6
Win	22–13	Sep 2013	Romania F10, Brașov	Futures	Clay	(Romania) Alexandru-Daniel Carpen	(Romania) Teodor-Dacian Crăciun (Romania) Petru-Alexandru Luncanu	6–7^{(5–7)}, 6–2, [10–8]
Win	23–13	Sep 2013	Morocco F4, Agadir	Futures	Clay	(Germany) Steven Moneke	(Spain) Rafael Mazón-Hernández (Spain) Alberto Santos Bravo	6–3, 6–1
Loss	23–14	Dec 2013	Chile F10, Temuco	Futures	Clay	(Chile) Mauricio Álvarez-Guzmán	(Argentina) Pablo Galdón (Argentina) Andrés Molteni	1–6, 1–6
Win	24–14	Mar 2014	Chile F2, Concón	Futures	Clay	(Chile) Jorge Aguilar	(Brazil) Bruno Sant'anna (Brazil) Caio Zampieri	6–4, 6–7^{(5–7)}, [12–10]
Loss	24–15	Apr 2014	Santiago, Chile	Challenger	Clay	(Chile) Jorge Aguilar	(Chile) Christian Garín (Chile) Nicolás Jarry	w/o
Win	25–15	Sep 2014	Meknes, Morocco	Challenger	Clay	(Italy) Stefano Travaglia	(Spain) Gerard Granollers (Spain) Jordi Samper Montaña	6–2, 6–7^{(4–7)}, [10–7]
Loss	25–16	Oct 2014	Chile F5, Coquimbo	Futures	Clay	(Chile) Victor Núñez	(Brazil) Fabricio Neis (Brazil) José Pereira	7–5, 2–6, [11–13]
Win	26–16	Dec 2014	Chile F9, Osorno	Futures	Clay	(Chile) Cristóbal Saavedra Corvalán	(Uruguay) Martín Cuevas (Uruguay) Rodrigo Senattore	7–6^{(9–7)}, 2–6, [10–8]
Win	27–16	Dec 2014	Chile F12, Santiago	Futures	Clay	(Chile) Julio Peralta	(Uruguay) Ariel Behar (Chile) Gonzalo Lama	7–6^{(7–3)}, 6–2
Win	28–16	Feb 2015	Santo Domingo, Dominican Republic	Challenger	Clay	(Venezuela) Roberto Maytín	(Monaco) Romain Arneodo (Monaco) Benjamin Balleret	6–3, 2–6, [10–4]
Win	29–16	Feb 2015	Chile F2, Viña del Mar	Futures	Clay	(Chile) Jorge Aguilar	(Uruguay) Martín Cuevas (Argentina) Nicolás Kicker	6–4, 7–6^{(7–5)}
Win	30–16	Apr 2015	Chile F3, Santiago	Futures	Clay	(Chile) Jorge Aguilar	(Argentina) Nicolás Kicker (Brazil) Fabricio Neis	7–6^{(7–4)}, 5–7,[10–4]
Win	31–16	Apr 2015	Vercelli, Italy	Challenger	Clay	(Italy) Andrea Arnaboldi	(Belarus) Sergey Betov (Russia) Mikhail Elgin	6–7^{(5–7)}, 7–5, [10–3]
Win	32–16	May 2015	Ostrava, Czech Republic	Challenger	Clay	(Slovakia) Andrej Martin	(Czech Republic) Roman Jebavý (Czech Republic) Jan Šátral	4–6, 7–5, [10–1]
Win	33–16	May 2015	Romania F4, Bacău	Futures	Clay	(Chile) Juan Carlos Sáez	(Romania) Alexandru-Daniel Carpen (Serbia) Ilija Vučić	6–3, 4–6, [10–7]
Win	34–16	Jul 2015	Biella, Italy	Challenger	Clay	(Slovakia) Andrej Martin	(Romania) Alexandru-Daniel Carpen (Croatia) Dino Marcan	7–5, 1–6, [10–8]
Win	35–16	Aug 2015	Liberec, Czech Republic	Challenger	Clay	(Slovakia) Andrej Martin	(Netherlands) Wesley Koolhof (Netherlands) Matwé Middelkoop	7–5, 6–7^{(3–7)}, [10–5]
Win	36–16	Sep 2015	Campinas, Brazil	Challenger	Clay	(Argentina) Andrés Molteni	(Brazil) Guilherme Clezar (Brazil) Fabricio Neis	3–6, 6–2, [10–0]
Win	37–16	Oct 2015	São Paulo, Brazil	Challenger	Clay	(Brazil) Caio Zampieri	(Argentina) Nicolás Kicker (Argentina) Renzo Olivo	7–5, 6–0
Loss	37–17	Oct 2015	Santiago, Chile	Challenger	Clay	(Slovakia) Andrej Martin	(Argentina) Guillermo Durán (Argentina) Máximo González	6–7^{(2–7)}, 5–7
Win	38–17	Oct 2015	Lima, Peru	Challenger	Clay	(Slovakia) Andrej Martin	(Brazil) Rogério Dutra Silva (Brazil) João Souza	6–3, 6–4
Win	39–17	Nov 2015	Montevideo, Uruguay	Challenger	Clay	(Slovakia) Andrej Martin	(Brazil) Marcelo Demoliner (Portugal) Gastão Elias	6–4, 3–6, [10–6]
Win	40–17	Mar 2016	Santiago, Chile	Challenger	Clay	(Chile) Julio Peralta	(Argentina) Facundo Bagnis (Argentina) Máximo González	7–6^{(7–4)}, 4–6, [10–5]
Win	41–17	Apr 2016	Turin, Italy	Challenger	Clay	(Slovakia) Andrej Martin	(Australia) Rameez Junaid (Poland) Mateusz Kowalczyk	4–6, 7–6^{(7–3)}, [12–10]
Loss	41–18	May 2016	Ostrava, Czech Republic	Challenger	Clay	(Czech Republic) Lukáš Dlouhý	(Netherlands) Sander Arends (Austria) Tristan-Samuel Weissborn	6–7^{(8–10)}, 7–6^{(7–4)}, [5–10]
Loss	41–19	Jun 2016	Prostějov, Czech Republic	Challenger	Clay	(Chile) Julio Peralta	(Belarus) Aliaksandr Bury (Slovakia) Igor Zelenay	4–6, 4–6
Win	42–19	Jul 2016	Cali, Colombia	Challenger	Clay	(Chile) Nicolás Jarry	(Italy) Erik Crepaldi (Brazil) Daniel Dutra da Silva	6–1, 7–6^{(8–6)}
Loss	42–20	Jul 2016	Biella, Italy	Challenger	Clay	(Slovakia) Andrej Martin	(Germany) Andre Begemann (India) Leander Paes	4–6, 4–6
Win	43–20	Jan 2017	Happy Valley, Australia	Challenger	Hard	(United States) Max Schnur	(Australia) Steven De Waard (Australia) Marc Polmans	7–6^{(7–5)}, 4–6, [10–6]
Win	44–20	Jan 2017	Koblenz, Germany	Challenger	Hard (i)	(Belarus) Andrei Vasilevski	(Czech Republic) Roman Jebavý (Czech Republic) Lukáš Rosol	7–5, 3–6, [16–14]
Win	45–20	May 2017	Shymkent, Kazakhstan	Challenger	Clay	(Belarus) Andrei Vasilevski	(Belgium) Clement Geens (Argentina) Juan Pablo Paz	6–4, 6–2
Loss	45–21	Jun 2017	Prostějov, Czech Republic	Challenger	Clay	(Czech Republic) Roman Jebavý	(Argentina) Guillermo Durán (Argentina) Andrés Molteni	6–7^{(5–7)}, 7–6 ^{(7–5)}, [6–10]
Win	46–21	Aug 2017	Portorož, Slovenia	Challenger	Hard	(Belarus) Andrei Vasilevski	(Czech Republic) Lukáš Rosol (Croatia) Franko Škugor	6–3, 7–6^{(7–4)}
Win	47–21	Oct 2017	Tashkent, Uzbekistan	Challenger	Hard	(Belarus) Andrei Vasilevski	(India) Yuki Bhambri (India) Divij Sharan	6–4, 6–2
Loss	47–22	Jan 2018	Canberra, Australia	Challenger	Hard	(Belarus) Andrei Vasilevski	(Israel) Jonathan Erlich (India) Divij Sharan	6–7^{(1–7)}, 2–6
Win	48–22	Sep 2018	Banja Luka, Bosnia/Herzegovina	Challenger	Clay	(Slovakia) Andrej Martin	(Lithuania) Laurynas Grigelis (Italy) Alessandro Motti	7–5, 4–6, [10–7]
Loss	48–23	Apr 2019	Anning, China	Challenger	Clay	(Netherlands) David Pel	(Australia) Max Purcell (Australia) Luke Saville	6–4, 5–7, [5–10]
Win	49–23	Jun 2019	Almaty, Kazakhstan	Challenger	Clay	(Slovakia) Andrej Martin	(Portugal) Gonçalo Oliveira (Belarus) Andrei Vasilevski	7–6^{(7–4)}, 3–6, [10–8]
Loss	49–24	Sep 2019	Szczecin, Poland	Challenger	Clay	(Netherlands) Matwé Middelkoop	(Argentina) Guido Andreozzi (Argentina) Andrés Molteni	4–6, 3–6
Loss	49–25	Sep 2019	Orléans, France	Challenger	Hard	(Austria) Tristan-Samuel Weissborn	(Monaco) Romain Arneodo (Monaco) Hugo Nys	7–6^{(7–5)}, 3–6, [1–10]

== Personal life ==
Born to an Austrian father and a Chilean mother, his father, Johann, is a former football goalkeeper who played for clubs such as SK Vorwärts Steyr and SAK 1914. As an anecdote, he retired from football due to the fact that he suffered serious facial fractures after an accidental blow by Alfred Schweinsteiger, former player of FC Kufstein and the father of Bastian.

He has a twin sister, Soledad, and speaks English, German and Italian.

He has served as an Greenpeace Ambassador.

== Doubles performance timeline ==
Key
W	F	SF	QF	#R	RR	Q#	P#	DNQ	A	Z#	PO	G	S	B	NMS	NTI	P	NH

(W) winner; (F) finalist; (SF) semifinalist; (QF) quarterfinalist; (#R) rounds 4, 3, 2, 1; (RR) round-robin stage; (Q#) qualification round; (P#) preliminary round; (DNQ) did not qualify; (A) absent; (Z#) Davis/Fed Cup Zonal Group (with number indication) or (PO) play-off; (G) gold, (S) silver or (B) bronze Olympic/Paralympic medal; (NMS) not a Masters tournament; (NTI) not a Tier I tournament; (P) postponed; (NH) not held; (SR) strike rate (events won / competed); (W–L) win–loss record.

Tournament	2015	2016	2017	2018	2019	W–L
Grand Slam tournaments
Australian Open	A	1R	A	3R	1R	2–3
French Open	A	A	A	1R	A	0–1
Wimbledon	Q1	2R	QF	2R	A	5–3
US Open	A	1R	1R	A	A	0–2
Win–loss	0–0	1–3	3–2	3–3	0–1	7–9
National representation
Davis Cup	Z2	PO	Z1	Z1	GS	8–4
