= Luca Margaroli =

Swiss tennis player

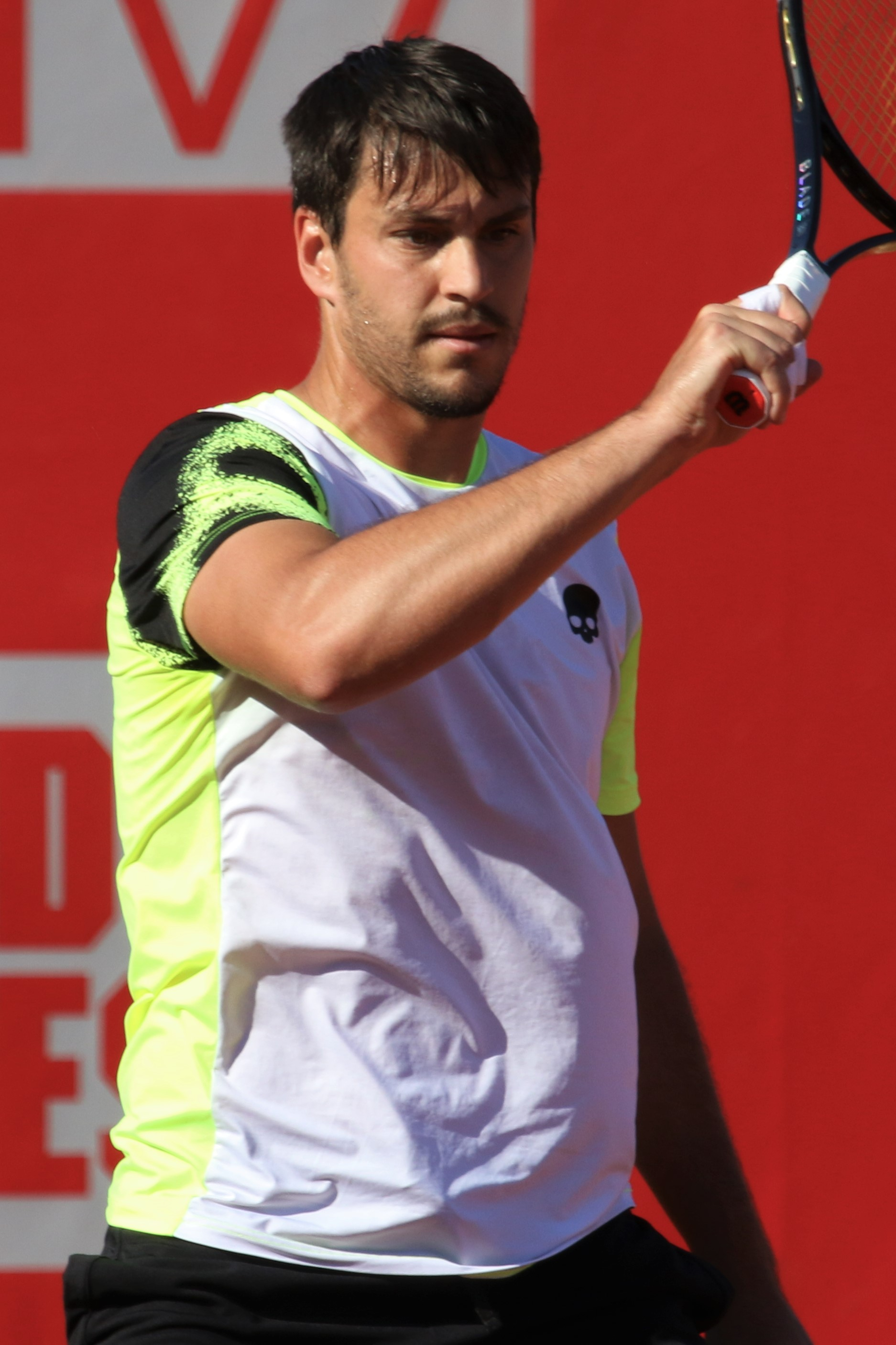
- Margaroli at the 2022 BNP Paribas Primrose Bordeaux
- Country (sports): Switzerland
- Residence: Lugano, Switzerland
- Born: 15 February 1992 (age 34) Brescia, Italy
- Plays: Right-handed (one handed-backhand)
- Prize money: $228,626

Singles
- Career record: 0–0 (at ATP Tour level, Grand Slam level, and in Davis Cup)
- Career titles: 0
- Highest ranking: No. 692 (23 October 2017)

Doubles
- Career record: 3–17 (at ATP Tour level, Grand Slam level, and in Davis Cup)
- Career titles: 0 (4 Challengers, 22 Futures)
- Highest ranking: No. 128 (6 June 2019)

Luca Margaroli (born 15 February 1992) is a Swiss tennis player. He has a career high ATP doubles ranking of No. 128, achieved on 6 June 2019, and a singles ranking of No. 692, achieved on 23 October 2017.

== Career ==
Margaroli made his ATP main draw doubles debut at the 2015 Geneva Open, where he partnered Henri Laaksonen, having received a wildcard.

At the 2015 Swiss Open Gstaad, Margaroli was also given a wildcard into the doubles event partnering Laaksonen. The pair defeated Santiago Giraldo and Feliciano López in the first round.

He also received a wildcard in doubles for the 2024 Geneva Open partnering Damien Wenger.

== Challenger and Futures finals ==
=== Doubles: 60 (26–34) ===
Legend (doubles) ATP Challenger Tour (4–15) ITF Futures Tour (22–19)	Titles by surface Hard (12–17) Clay (13–17) Grass (0–0) Carpet (1–0)

Result	W–L	Date	Tournament	Tier	Surface	Partner	Opponents	Score
Loss	0–1	Oct 2010	Kuwait F1, Meshref	Futures	Hard	(Russia) Mikhail Vasiliev	(Croatia) Roko Karanušić (Germany) Sebastian Rieschick	1–6, 4–6
Loss	0–2	Oct 2011	Kuwait F2, Meshref	Futures	Hard	(Switzerland) Henri Laaksonen	(Germany) Florian Fallert (Germany) Nils Langer	4–6, 6–7^{(6–8)}
Loss	0–3	Jul 2012	USA F21, Godfrey	Futures	Hard	(France) Sébastien Boltz	(El Salvador) Marcelo Arévalo (United States) Ryan Rowe	4–6, 4–6
Win	1–3	Sep 2012	Turkey F35, Antalya	Futures	Hard	(Russia) Kirill Dmitriev	(Turkey) Tuna Altuna (Austria) Nikolaus Moser	6–4, 6–0
Win	2–3	Sep 2012	Turkey F36, Antalya	Futures	Hard	(Russia) Kirill Dmitriev	(Czech Republic) Jakub Hadrava (Czech Republic) Ondřej Vaculík	3–6, 7–6^{(7–1)}, [10–8]
Loss	2–4	Apr 2013	Turkey F14, Antalya	Futures	Hard	(Moldova) Andrei Ciumac	(Argentina) Maximiliano Estévez (Dominican Republic) José Hernández-Fernández	2–6, 1–6
Loss	2–5	Jun 2013	Turkey F23, Manisa	Futures	Clay	(Ukraine) Vladyslav Manafov	(Ukraine) Gleb Alekseenko (Russia) Mikhail Biryukov	6–2, 6–7^{(4–7)}, [7–10]
Loss	2–6	Jul 2013	Italy F16, Sassuolo	Futures	Clay	(France) Jérôme Inzerillo	(Australia) Ryan Agar (Austria) Sebastian Bader	3–6, 5–7
Loss	2–7	Aug 2013	Latvia F1, Jūrmala	Futures	Clay	(Russia) Kirill Dmitriev	(Latvia) Miķelis Lībietis (Latvia) Oskars Vaskis	7–6^{(7–3)}, 3–6, [10–12]
Loss	2–8	Aug 2013	Romania F8, Iași	Futures	Clay	(Italy) Matteo Marfia	(Romania) Alexandru-Daniel Carpen (Moldova) Maxim Dubarenco	6–4, 3–6, [4–10]
Win	3–8	Dec 2013	Senegal F2, Dakar	Futures	Hard	(Czech Republic) Libor Salaba	(Zimbabwe) Mark Fynn (South Africa) Damon Gooch	6–4, 6–4
Win	4–8	Mar 2014	Switzerland F2, Trimbach	Futures	Carpet (i)	(Switzerland) Henri Laaksonen	(Russia) Denis Matsukevich (Italy) Matteo Volante	6–2, 6–2
Loss	4–9	Apr 2014	Turkey F11, Antalya	Futures	Hard	(Czech Republic) Adam Pavlásek	(France) Rémi Boutillier (Benin) Alexis Klégou	3–6, 6–3, [7–10]
Win	5–9	Apr 2014	Turkey F12, Antalya	Futures	Hard	(Benin) Alexis Klégou	(France) Éric Fomba (France) Maxime Tchoutakian	6–3, 6–1
Loss	5–10	Apr 2014	Turkey F13, Antalya	Futures	Hard	(Benin) Alexis Klégou	(Russia) Stanislav Vovk (Russia) Anton Zaitcev	4–6, 5–7
Win	6–10	Jul 2014	Bulgaria F5, Plovdiv	Futures	Clay	(Monaco) Romain Arneodo	(Bulgaria) Dinko Halachev (Bulgaria) Vasko Mladenov	7–6^{(7–4)}, 6–4
Win	7–10	Aug 2014	Georgia F2, Telavi	Futures	Clay	(France) Grégoire Barrère	(Italy) Riccardo Bonadio (Italy) Gianluca Mager	7–6^{(7–5)}, 7–6^{(7–5)}
Win	8–10	Aug 2014	Georgia F3, Telavi	Futures	Clay	(France) Grégoire Barrère	(Russia) Niko Muradashvili (Russia) Evgenii Tiurnev	6–1, 6–1
Loss	8–11	Aug 2014	Iran F8, Tehran	Futures	Clay	(Italy) Matteo Marfia	(France) Jules Marie (France) Alexis Musialek	5–7, 6–7^{(5–7)}
Win	9–11	Sep 2014	Iran F10, Tehran	Futures	Clay	(Italy) Matteo Marfia	(Venezuela) Jordi Muñoz Abreu (Netherlands) Mark Vervoort	6–4, 7–6^{(7–4)}
Win	10–11	Oct 2014	Egypt F27, Sharm El Sheikh	Futures	Hard	(Italy) Matteo Marfia	(Czech Republic) Libor Salaba (Bosnia and Herzegovina) Aldin Šetkić	w/o
Loss	10–12	May 2015	Romania F1, Galați	Futures	Clay	(Austria) Tristan-Samuel Weissborn	(Romania) Alexandru-Daniel Carpen (Romania) Luca George Tatomir	5–7, 3–6
Loss	10–13	May 2015	Romania F2, Galați	Futures	Clay	(Romania) Victor Vlad Cornea	(Romania) Petru-Alexandru Luncanu (Lithuania) Lukas Mugevičius	5–7, 4–6
Win	11–13	Jun 2015	Lebanon F1, Jounieh	Futures	Clay	(Italy) Matteo Marfia	(Sweden) Milos Sekulic (Finland) Henrik Sillanpää	6–4, 6–2
Win	12–13	Jun 2015	Austria F1, Seefeld	Futures	Clay	(Italy) Andrea Basso	(Brazil) Eduardo Dischinger (Switzerland) Jacob Kahoun	6–3, 6–3
Win	13–13	Aug 2015	Austria F8, Vogau	Futures	Clay	(Austria) Lucas Miedler	(Austria) Pascal Brunner (Russia) Kirill Dmitriev	7–6^{(7–4)}, 5–7, [10–5]
Loss	13–14	Aug 2015	Austria F9, Pörtschach	Futures	Clay	(Germany) Kevin Krawietz	(Russia) Kirill Dmitriev (Austria) Lucas Miedler	2–6, 5–7
Loss	13–15	Sep 2015	Egypt F32, Cairo	Futures	Clay	(France) Adrien Puget	(Egypt) Karim-Mohamed Maamoun (Egypt) Mohamed Safwat	4–6, 5–7
Loss	13–16	Oct 2015	Turkey F41, Antalya	Futures	Clay	(Russia) Kirill Dmitriev	(Turkey) Sarp Ağabigün (India) Ramkumar Ramanathan	4–6, 4–6
Win	14–16	Jan 2016	Egypt F2, Sharm El Sheikh	Futures	Hard	(Egypt) Mohamed Safwat	(Spain) Enrique López Pérez (France) Laurent Rochette	6–3, 3–6, [10–7]
Loss	14–17	Apr 2016	Nigeria F2, Abuja	Futures	Hard	(Serbia) Ilija Vučić	(Netherlands) David Pel (Netherlands) Antal van der Duim	5–7, 6–3, [7–10]
Loss	14–18	May 2016	Bulgaria F1, Sozopol	Futures	Hard	(Spain) David Pérez Sanz	(Russia) Alexander Igoshin (Russia) Yan Sabanin	6–2, 3–6, [6–10]
Win	15–18	Jun 2016	Fergana, Uzbekistan	Challenger	Hard	(France) Yannick Jankovits	(Japan) Toshihide Matsui (India) Vishnu Vardhan	6–4, 7–6^{(7–4)}
Win	16–18	Sep 2016	Meknes, Morocco	Challenger	Clay	(Egypt) Mohamed Safwat	(Spain) Pedro Martínez (Spain) Oriol Roca Batalla	6–4, 6–4
Loss	16–19	Oct 2016	Pune, India	Challenger	Hard	(France) Hugo Nys	(India) Purav Raja (India) Divij Sharan	6–3, 3–6, [9–11]
Win	17–19	Nov 2016	South Africa F1, Stellenbosch	Futures	Hard	(Italy) Alessandro Bega	(South Africa) Chris Haggard (South Africa) Nicolaas Scholtz	7–5, 6–2
Win	18–19	Nov 2016	South Africa F2, Stellenbosch	Futures	Hard	(Hungary) Gábor Borsos	(United Kingdom) James Marsalek (Spain) Jordi Samper Montaña	6–2, 6–3
Win	19–19	Nov 2016	South Africa F3, Stellenbosch	Futures	Hard	(Hungary) Gábor Borsos	(Peru) Alexander Merino (Germany) Christoph Negritu	7–6^{(8–6)}, 5–7, [10–5]
Loss	19–20	Apr 2017	León, Mexico	Challenger	Hard	(Brazil) Caio Zampieri	(India) Leander Paes (Canada) Adil Shamasdin	1–6, 4–6
Loss	19–21	Jun 2017	Poprad-Tatry, Slovakia	Challenger	Clay	(Austria) Tristan-Samuel Weissborn	(Poland) Mateusz Kowalczyk (Germany) Andreas Mies	3–6, 6–7^{(3–7)}
Win	20–21	Aug 2017	Switzerland F3, Collonge-Bellerive	Futures	Clay	(Switzerland) Louroi Martínez	(Switzerland) Jakub Paul (Switzerland) Damien Wenger	6–4, 6–3
Win	21–21	Nov 2017	Israel F15, Meitar	Futures	Hard	(France) Yannick Jankovits	(United Kingdom) Richard Gabb (United Kingdom) Luke Johnson	7–6^{(7–4)}, 6–7^{(4–7)}, [10–6]
Loss	21–22	Nov 2017	Brescia, Italy	Challenger	Hard (i)	(Austria) Tristan-Samuel Weissborn	(Netherlands) Sander Arends (Belgium) Sander Gillé	2–6, 3–6
Win	22–22	Dec 2017	Turkey F45, Antalya	Futures	Clay	(Serbia) Nikola Ćaćić	(Turkey) Gökberk Ergeneman (Uzbekistan) Khumoyun Sultanov	7–5, 6–2
Win	23–22	Dec 2017	Turkey F46, Antalya	Futures	Clay	(Serbia) Nikola Ćaćić	(Russia) Ivan Gakhov (Russia) Alexander Pavlioutchenkov	6–3, 7–6^{(7–1)}
Loss	23–23	Apr 2018	Uzbekistan F1, Bukhara	Futures	Hard	(Serbia) Nikola Ćaćić	(Russia) Alexander Pavlioutchenkov (Russia) Evgenii Tiurnev	6–7^{(4–7)}, 7–6^{(7–5)}, [8–10]
Loss	23–24	Jun 2018	Lyon, France	Challenger	Clay	(Chinese Taipei) Hsieh Cheng-peng	(France) Elliot Benchetrit (France) Geoffrey Blancaneaux	3–6, 6–4, [7–10]
Loss	23–25	Jun 2018	Poprad-Tatry, Slovakia	Challenger	Clay	(Serbia) Nikola Ćaćić	(Bosnia and Herzegovina) Tomislav Brkić (Croatia) Ante Pavić	3–6, 6–4, [14–16]
Loss	23–26	Jul 2018	Marburg, Germany	Challenger	Clay	(Switzerland) Henri Laaksonen	(Brazil) Fabrício Neis (Spain) David Vega Hernández	6–4, 4–6, [8–10]
Loss	23–27	Feb 2019	Budapest, Hungary	Challenger	Hard (i)	(Italy) Filippo Baldi	(Germany) Kevin Krawietz (Slovakia) Filip Polášek	5–7, 6–7^{(5–7)}
Win	24–27	May 2019	Ostrava, Czech Republic	Challenger	Clay	(Slovakia) Filip Polášek	(Netherlands) Thiemo de Bakker (Netherlands) Tallon Griekspoor	6–4, 2–6, [10–8]
Loss	24–28	Aug 2019	L'Aquila, Italy	Challenger	Clay	(Italy) Andrea Vavassori	(Bosnia and Herzegovina) Tomislav Brkić (Croatia) Ante Pavić	3-6, 2-6
Win	25–28	Sep 2019	Florence, Italy	Challenger	Clay	(Canada) Adil Shamasdin	(Spain) Gerard Granollers (Spain) Pedro Martínez	7–5, 6–7^{(6–8)}, [14–12]
Win	26–28	Jan 2020	M15 Te Anau, New Zealand	World Tennis Tour	Hard	(Italy) Andrea Vavassori	(New Zealand) Rhett Purcell (Australia) Calum Puttergill	7–5, 6–7^{(2–7)}, [10–8]
Loss	26–29	Jan 2020	Nouméa, New Caledonia	Challenger	Hard	(Italy) Andrea Vavassori	(Spain) Mario Vilella Martínez (Italy) Andrea Pellegrino	6–7^{(1–7)}, 6–3, [10–12]
Loss	26–30	Jan 2020	Burnie, Australia	Challenger	Hard	(Italy) Andrea Vavassori	(Finland) Harri Heliövaara (Netherlands) Sem Verbeek	6–7^{(5–7)}, 6-7^{(4–7)}
Loss	26–31	Jan 2020	Bergamo, Italy	Challenger	Hard (i)	(Italy) Andrea Vavassori	(Czech Republic) Zdeněk Kolář (Italy) Julian Ocleppo	4-6, 3-6
Loss	26–32	Aug 2021	Verona, Italy	Challenger	Clay	(Portugal) Gonçalo Oliveira	(France) Sadio Doumbia (France) Fabien Reboul	5–7, 6–4, [6–10]
Loss	26–33	Oct 2021	Sibiu, Romania	Challenger	Clay	(United States) James Cerretani	(Austria) Alexander Erler (Austria) Lucas Miedler	3-6, 1-6
Loss	26–34	Jan 2022	Columbus, USA	Challenger	Hard (i)	(Japan) Yasutaka Uchiyama	(United States) Tennys Sandgren (Denmark) Mikael Torpegaard	7–5, 4–6, [5–10]
