= Jan Šátral =

Czech tennis player (born 1990)

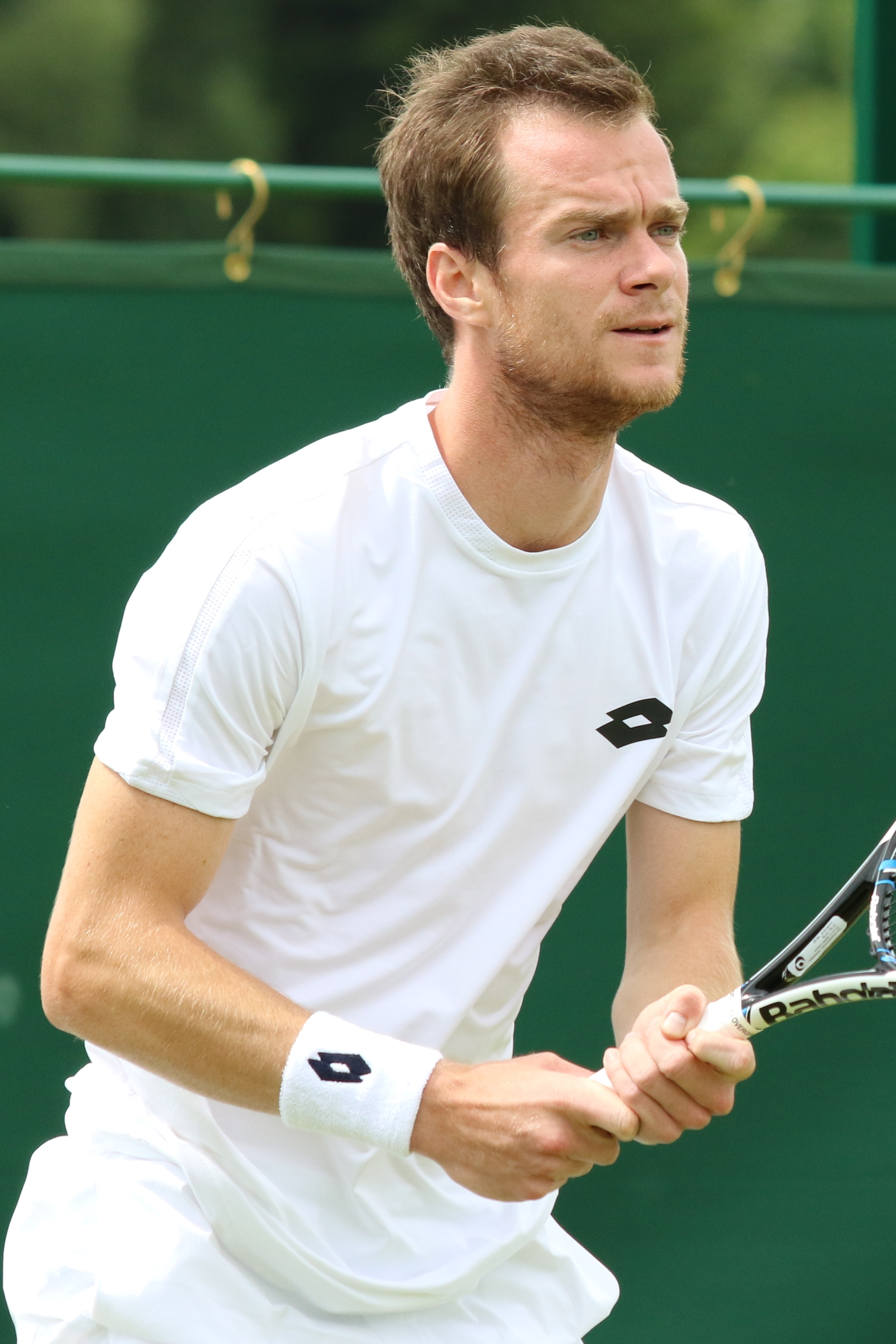
- Šátral at the 2016 Wimbledon qualifying
- Country (sports): Czech Republic
- Residence: Mělník, Czech Republic
- Born: 24 July 1990 (age 35) Mělník, Czechoslovakia (now Czech Republic)
- Height: 1.85 m (6 ft 1 in)
- Turned pro: 2010
- Plays: Right-handed (two-handed backhand)
- Coach: Jiří Hřebec
- Prize money: $367,636

Singles
- Career record: 1–4
- Career titles: 0
- Highest ranking: No. 136 (3 October 2016)

Grand Slam singles results
- Australian Open: Q3 (2017)
- French Open: Q3 (2017)
- Wimbledon: Q2 (2016)
- US Open: 2R (2016)

Doubles
- Career record: 0–1
- Career titles: 0
- Highest ranking: No. 160 (21 September 2015)

Team competitions
- Davis Cup: 0–3

Jan Šátral (born 24 July 1990, in Melnik) is an inactive Czech tennis player. Šátral has a career-high ATP singles ranking of No. 136 achieved on 3 October 2016. He also has a career-high doubles ranking of world No. 160 achieved on 21 September 2015. He has won two Challenger and nine ITF singles titles as well as two Challenger and 21 ITF doubles titles.

Šátral won his first ATP Challenger title at Poprad-Tatry in the doubles event partnering Roman Jebavý. In July 2016, he won his maiden singles Challenger title at Marburg by defeating heavily favoured Marco Trungelliti, in straight sets.

On his Grand Slam debut in the main draw, he reached the second round of the 2016 US Open as a qualifier where he defeated Mackenzie McDonald in five sets. As a result of this best showing at a major event, he reached a career-high ranking of world No. 136 on 3 October 2016.

== Personal life ==
In 2019, he married fellow tennis player Denisa Allertová.

== Performance timeline ==
Key
W	F	SF	QF	#R	RR	Q#	DNQ	A	NH

(W) winner; (F) finalist; (SF) semifinalist; (QF) quarterfinalist; (#R) rounds 4, 3, 2, 1; (RR) round-robin stage; (Q#) qualification round; (DNQ) did not qualify; (A) absent; (NH) not held; (SR) strike rate (events won / competed); (W–L) win–loss record.

=== Singles ===
Tournament	2015	2016	2017	SR	W–L	Win %
Grand Slam tournaments
Australian Open	A	Q1	Q3	0 / 0	0–0	–
French Open	A	Q1	Q3	0 / 0	0–0	–
Wimbledon	A	Q2	Q1	0 / 0	0–0	–
US Open	Q1	2R	Q3	0 / 1	1–1	50%
Win–loss	0–0	1–1	0–0	0 / 1	1–1	50%

== ATP Challenger & ITF Futures Finals ==
=== Singles: 21 (12–9) ===
Legend ATP Challenger Tour (2–0) ITF Futures Tour (10–9)	Finals by surface Hard (4–4) Clay (8–4) Carpet (0–1)

Result	W–L	Date	Tournament	Tier	Surface	Opponent	Score
Win	1–0	Aug 2011	Slovakia F1, Piešťany	Futures	Clay	(Slovakia) Michal Pažický	6–7^{(5–7)}, 6–1, 6–4
Loss	1–1	Nov 2012	Czech Republic F5, Rožnov pod Radhoštěm	Futures	Carpet (i)	(Czech Republic) Roman Jebavý	2–6, 4–6
Win	2–1	Aug 2013	Slovakia F3, Piešťany	Futures	Clay	(Italy) Marco Bortolotti	6–1, 6–0
Loss	2–2	Jun 2014	Poland F3, Ślęza	Futures	Hard	(France) Jérôme Inzerillo	3–6, 4–6
Win	3–2	Jun 2014	Poland F4, Wrocław	Futures	Clay	(Germany) Maximilian Marterer	6–4, 7–6^{(7–4)}
Win	4–2	Aug 2014	Slovakia F4, Trnava	Futures	Clay	(Czech Republic) Václav Šafránek	6–4, 7–6^{(7–5)}
Loss	4–3	Sep 2014	Croatia F19, Bol	Futures	Clay	(Croatia) Duje Kekez	3–6, 0–6
Win	5–3	Oct 2014	Greece F8, Heraklion	Futures	Hard	(Belgium) Alexandre Folie	4–6, 6–4, 6–1
Loss	5–4	Feb 2015	Sri Lanka F1, Colombo	Futures	Clay	(Portugal) Rui Machado	3–6, 3–6
Win	6–4	Mar 2015	Egypt F9, Sharm El Sheikh	Futures	Hard	(Egypt) Mohamed Safwat	6–3, 6–4
Win	7–4	May 2015	Czech Republic F3, Most	Futures	Clay	(Slovakia) Adrian Sikora	6–4, 6–2
Win	8–4	May 2016	Czech Republic F1, Most	Futures	Clay	(Belgium) Clément Geens	6–3, 6–3
Win	9–4	Jul 2016	Marburg, Germany	Challenger	Clay	(Argentina) Marco Trungelliti	6–2, 6–4
Win	10–4	Oct 2016	Rome, Italy	Challenger	Clay	(Netherlands) Robin Haase	6–3, 6–2
Loss	10–5	Nov 2017	Czech Republic F9, Milovice	Futures	Hard (i)	(Czech Republic) Marek Jaloviec	3–6, 4–6
Loss	10–6	Jun 2019	M25+H Most, Czech Republic	World Tennis Tour	Clay	(France) Maxime Chazal	7–5, 6–7^{(6–8)}, 5–7
Win	11–6	Nov 2019	M15 Milovice, Czech Republic	World Tennis Tour	Hard (i)	(Czech Republic) Martin Krumich	6–3, 6–3
Loss	11–7	Dec 2019	M15 Monastir, Tunisia	World Tennis Tour	Hard	(Tunisia) Aziz Dougaz	3–6, 4–6
Win	12–7	Feb 2020	M15 Oberhaching, Germany	World Tennis Tour	Hard	(Germany) Elmar Ejupovic	6–3, 6–2
Loss	12–8	Oct 2020	M25 Pardubice, Czech Republic	World Tennis Tour	Clay	(Russia) Uladzimir Ignatik	3–6, 2–6
Loss	12–9	Feb 2021	M15 Sharm El Sheikh, Egypt	World Tennis Tour	Hard	(Czech Republic) Marek Gengel	2–6, 2–6

=== Doubles: 36 (26–10) ===
Legend ATP Challenger Tour (3–2) ITF Futures Tour (23–8)	Finals by surface Hard (4–2) Clay (19–8) Grass (1–0) Carpet (2–0)

Result	W–L	Date	Tournament	Tier	Surface	Partner	Opponents	Score
Win	1–0	May 2010	Czech Republic F3, Jablonec nad Nisou	Futures	Clay	(Czech Republic) Jan Hradský	(Slovakia) Miloslav Mečíř (Slovakia) Michal Pažický	6–2, 6–3
Win	2–0	Aug 2011	Slovakia F1, Piešťany	Futures	Clay	(Czech Republic) Lubomír Majsajdr	(Poland) Adam Chadaj (Czech Republic) Michal Konečný	7–6^{(7–3)}, 7–6^{(7–4)}
Win	3–0	Aug 2011	Slovakia F3, Michalovce	Futures	Clay	(Czech Republic) Lubomír Majsajdr	(Czech Republic) Petr Kovačka (Czech Republic) Marek Michalička	6–4, 3–6, [10–6]
Loss	3–1	Oct 2011	Morocco F8, Tangier	Futures	Clay	(Czech Republic) Roman Jebavý	(Italy) Luca Vanni (Italy) Matteo Viola	3–6, 5–7
Win	4–1	Oct 2011	Morocco F9, Fez	Futures	Clay	(Czech Republic) Roman Jebavý	(France) Florent Diep (Czech Republic) Michal Schmid	6–7^{(6–8)}, 7–6^{(7–3)}, [10–7]
Win	5–1	Nov 2011	Czech Republic F4, Rožnov pod Radhoštěm	Futures	Carpet	(Czech Republic) Roman Jebavý	(Belarus) Sergey Betov (Belarus) Aliaksandr Bury	6–4, 6–3
Win	6–1	Jul 2012	Czech Republic F5, Prague	Futures	Clay	(Czech Republic) Roman Jebavý	(Slovakia) Patrik Fabian (Slovakia) Adrian Partl	6–1, 6–2
Win	7–1	Jul 2012	Czech Republic F6, Liberec	Futures	Clay	(Czech Republic) Jaroslav Pospíšil	(Czech Republic) Tomáš Cakl (Czech Republic) Lubomír Majsajdr	6–2, 6–4
Win	8–1	Aug 2012	Slovakia F3, Poprad	Futures	Clay	(Czech Republic) Roman Jebavý	(Slovakia) Filip Havaj (Slovakia) Juraj Simčák	6–2, 7–6^{(7–2)}
Loss	8–2	Sep 2012	Poland F6, Legnica	Futures	Clay	(Czech Republic) Adam Pavlásek	(Poland) Marcin Gawron (Poland) Grzegorz Panfil	walkover
Win	9–2	Nov 2012	Czech Republic F7, Rožnov pod Radhoštěm	Futures	Carpet	(Czech Republic) Roman Jebavý	(Belarus) Aliaksandr Bury (Belarus) Nikolai Fidirko	6–7^{(5–7)}, 6–1, [10–5]
Loss	9–3	May 2013	Czech Republic F2, Teplice	Futures	Clay	(Czech Republic) Roman Jebavý	(Czech Republic) David Pultr (Czech Republic) Marek Michalička	6–3, 3–6, [6–10]
Win	10–3	Mar 2014	Turkey F8, Antalya	Futures	Hard	(Czech Republic) Roman Jebavý	(Portugal) Romain Barbosa (Portugal) Frederico Ferreira Silva	6–2, 6–2
Win	11–3	Mar 2014	Turkey F9, Antalya	Futures	Hard	(Czech Republic) Roman Jebavý	(Russia) Anton Manegin (Russia) Aleksandr Vasilenko	6–3, 6–4
Win	12–3	Jul 2014	Austria F4, Kramsach	Futures	Clay	(Czech Republic) Roman Jebavý	(Czech Republic) František Polanka (Czech Republic) Dominik Sochurek	6–1, 7–5
Win	13–3	Aug 2014	Slovakia F4, Trnava	Futures	Clay	(Czech Republic) Jakub Filipský	(Slovakia) Karol Beck (Ukraine) Filipp Kekercheni	6–3, 6–2
Win	14–3	Aug 2014	Romania F12, Mediaș	Futures	Clay	(Czech Republic) Libor Salaba	(Romania) Lucian Gheorghe (Malaysia) Mohd Assri Merzuki	6–3, 6–4
Win	15–3	Aug 2014	Croatia F15, Osijek	Futures	Clay	(Czech Republic) Libor Salaba	(Croatia) Tomislav Draganja (Croatia) Antonio Šančić	7–6^{(7–4)}, 6–4
Win	16–3	Sep 2014	Croatia F19, Bol	Futures	Clay	(Czech Republic) Libor Salaba	(Austria) Tristan-Samuel Weissborn (Russia) Kirill Dmitriev	6–4, 6–1
Loss	16–4	Oct 2014	Greece F8, Heraklion	Futures	Hard	(Czech Republic) Václav Šafránek	(Germany) Peter Heller (Germany) Daniel Masur	5–7, 2–6
Win	17–4	Nov 2014	Czech Republic F5, Opava	Futures	Grass	(Czech Republic) Jaroslav Pospíšil	(Romania) Patrick Grigoriu (Romania) Costin Pavăl	7–6^{(7–4)}, 6–3
Win	18–4	Nov 2014	Egypt F34, Sharm El Sheikh	Futures	Hard	(Czech Republic) Libor Salaba	(Czech Republic) Dominik Kellovský (Czech Republic) Jaroslav Pospíšil	6–4, 6–4
Win	19–4	Feb 2015	Sri Lanka F2, Colombo	Futures	Clay	(Czech Republic) Libor Salaba	(Belgium) Sander Gillé (Chinese Taipei) Huang Liang-chi	6–2, 4–6, [11–9]
Loss	19–5	Mar 2015	Egypt F10, Sharm El Sheikh	Futures	Hard	(Czech Republic) Libor Salaba	(Czech Republic) Roman Jebavý (Czech Republic) Jaroslav Pospíšil	4–6, 3–6
Loss	19–6	Mar 2015	Egypt F11, Sharm El Sheikh	Futures	Hard	(Czech Republic) Libor Salaba	(Czech Republic) Roman Jebavý (Czech Republic) Jaroslav Pospíšil	4–6, 2–6
Loss	19–7	May 2015	Ostrava, Czech Republic	Challenger	Clay	(Czech Republic) Roman Jebavý	(Slovakia) Andrej Martin (Chile) Hans Podlipnik Castillo	6–4, 5–7, [1–10]
Win	20–7	May 2015	Czech Republic F3, Most	Futures	Clay	(Czech Republic) Roman Jebavý	(Czech Republic) Dominik Kellovský (Belarus) Uladzimir Ignatik	6–4, 4–6, [10–5]
Win	21–7	Jun 2015	Poprad, Slovakia	Challenger	Clay	(Czech Republic) Roman Jebavý	(Slovakia) Norbert Gombos (Czech Republic) Adam Pavlásek	6–2, 6–2
Win	22–7	Jun 2015	Czech Republic F4, Pardubice	Futures	Clay	(Czech Republic) Roman Jebavý	(Czech Republic) Filip Dolezel (Czech Republic) Václav Šafránek	6–4, 6–3
Loss	22–8	Sep 2015	Banja Luka, Bosnia & Herzegovina	Challenger	Clay	(Czech Republic) Jaroslav Pospíšil	(Serbia) Ilija Bozoljac (Italy) Flavio Cipolla	2–6, 5–7
Win	23–8	Sep 2016	Banja Luka, Bosnia & Herzegovina	Challenger	Clay	(Czech Republic) Roman Jebavý	(Italy) Andrea Arnaboldi (Austria) Maximilian Neuchrist	7–6^{(7–3)}, 4–6, [10–7]
Win	24–8	Jul 2017	Prague, Czech Republic	Challenger	Clay	(Austria) Tristan-Samuel Weissborn	(Germany) Gero Kretschmer (Germany) Andreas Mies	6–3, 5–7, [10–3]
Win	25–8	May 2019	M25+H Jablonec nad Nisou, Czech Republic	World Tennis Tour	Clay	(Czech Republic) Václav Šafránek	(Croatia) Ivan Sabanov (Croatia) Matej Sabanov	7–6^{(7–4)}, 0–6, [10–8]
Loss	25–9	Jun 2019	M25+H Most, Czech Republic	World Tennis Tour	Clay	(Czech Republic) Václav Šafránek	(Czech Republic) Tadeas Paroulek (Czech Republic) Ondřej Štyler	5–7, 1–6
Loss	25–10	Dec 2019	M15 Monastir, Tunisia	World Tennis Tour	Hard	(Czech Republic) Ondřej Krstev	(Tunisia) Aziz Dougaz (Zimbabwe) Benjamin Lock	7–6^{(8–6)}, 2–6, [8–10]
Win	26–10	Mar 2020	M15 Trnava, Slovakia	World Tennis Tour	Hard	(Czech Republic) Patrik Rikl	(Germany) Kai Lemstra (Germany) Christoph Negritu	6–3, 6–4

== Davis Cup ==
=== Participations: (0–3) ===
Group membership World Group (0–3) WG Play-off (0–0) Group I (0–0) Group II (0–0) Group III (0–0) Group IV (0–0)	Matches by surface Hard (0–3) Clay (0–0) Grass (0–0) Carpet (0–0)	Matches by type Singles (0–2) Doubles (0–1)

- ▲ ▼ indicates the outcome of the Davis Cup match followed by the score, date, place of event, the zonal classification and its phase, and the court surface.

Rubber outcome	No.	Rubber	Match type (partner if any)	Opponent nation	Opponent player(s)	Score
▼1–4; 3-5 February 2017; Kooyong Lawn Tennis Club, Melbourne, Australia; World Group First round; Hard surface
Defeat	1	II	Singles	Australia	Nick Kyrgios	2–6, 3–6, 2–6
Defeat	2	III	Doubles (with Jiří Veselý)	Australia	Sam Groth / John Peers	3–6, 2–6, 2–6
Defeat	3	V	Singles	Australia	Jordan Thompson (dead rubber)	6–7^{(5–7)}, 2–6
