= Adam Pavlásek =

Czech tennis player (born 1994)

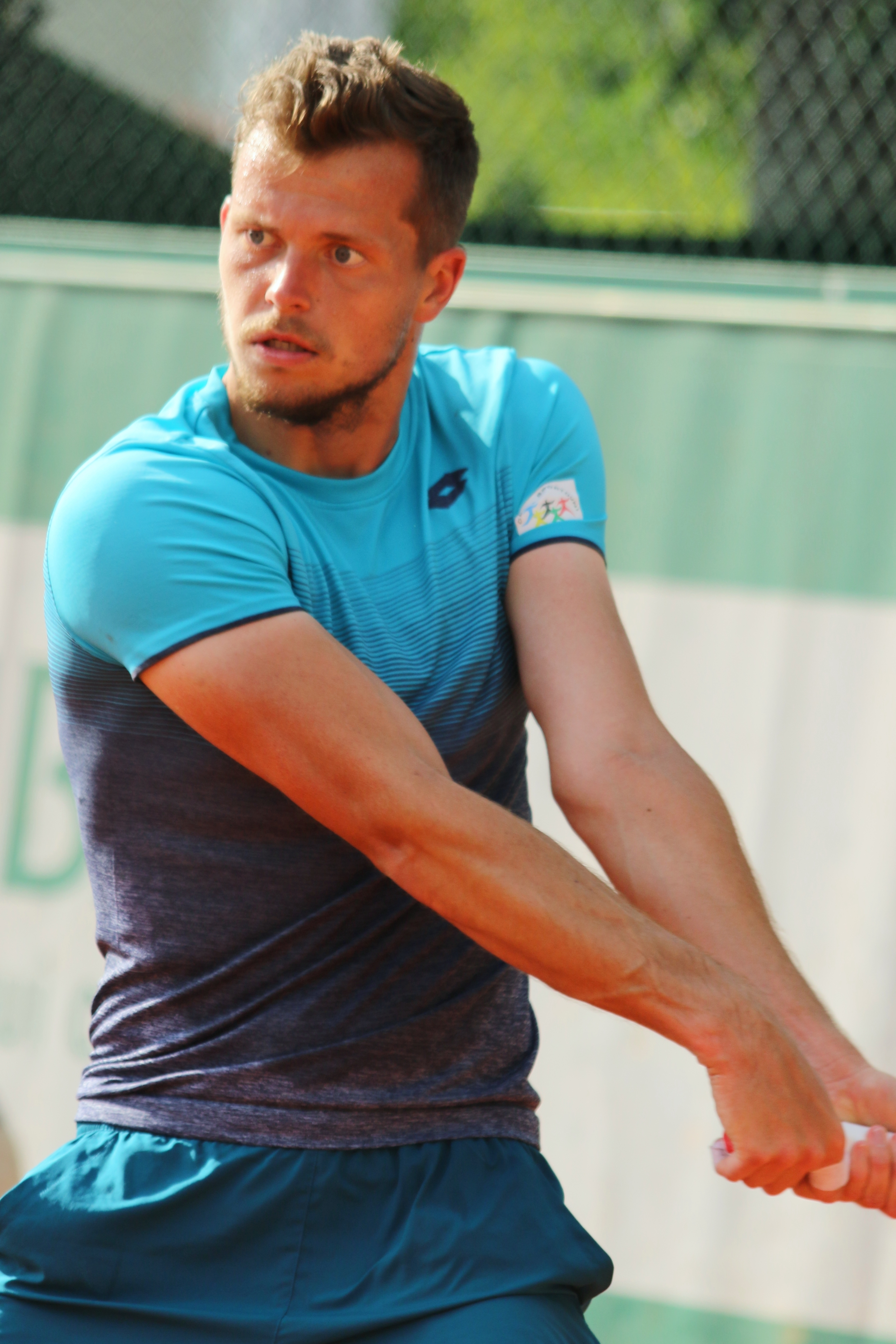
- Pavlásek at the 2018 French Open
- Country (sports): Czech Republic
- Born: 8 October 1994 (age 32) Bílovec, Czech Republic
- Height: 1.85 m (6 ft 1 in)
- Turned pro: 2012
- Plays: Right-handed (two-handed backhand)
- Coach: Michal Navratil
- Prize money: $ 1,771,056

Singles
- Career record: 6–9
- Career titles: 0
- Highest ranking: No. 72 (9 January 2017)

Grand Slam singles results
- Australian Open: 1R (2017)
- French Open: 2R (2016, 2018)
- Wimbledon: 2R (2017)
- US Open: Q1 (2015, 2018)

Doubles
- Career record: 59–62
- Career titles: 1
- Highest ranking: No. 29 (4 November 2024)
- Current ranking: No. 37 (20 July 2026)

Grand Slam doubles results
- Australian Open: QF (2024)
- French Open: 3R (2025, 2026)
- Wimbledon: QF (2023)
- US Open: 3R (2024, 2025)

Other doubles tournaments
- Olympic Games: SF (2024)
- Last updated on: 26 July 2026.

Adam Pavlásek (born 8 October 1994) is a Czech professional tennis player who specializes in doubles. He reached his career-high ATP doubles ranking of world No. 29 on 4 November 2024 and a singles ranking of world No. 72 in January 2017. He is the current No. 2 Czech ATP doubles player.

== Junior career ==
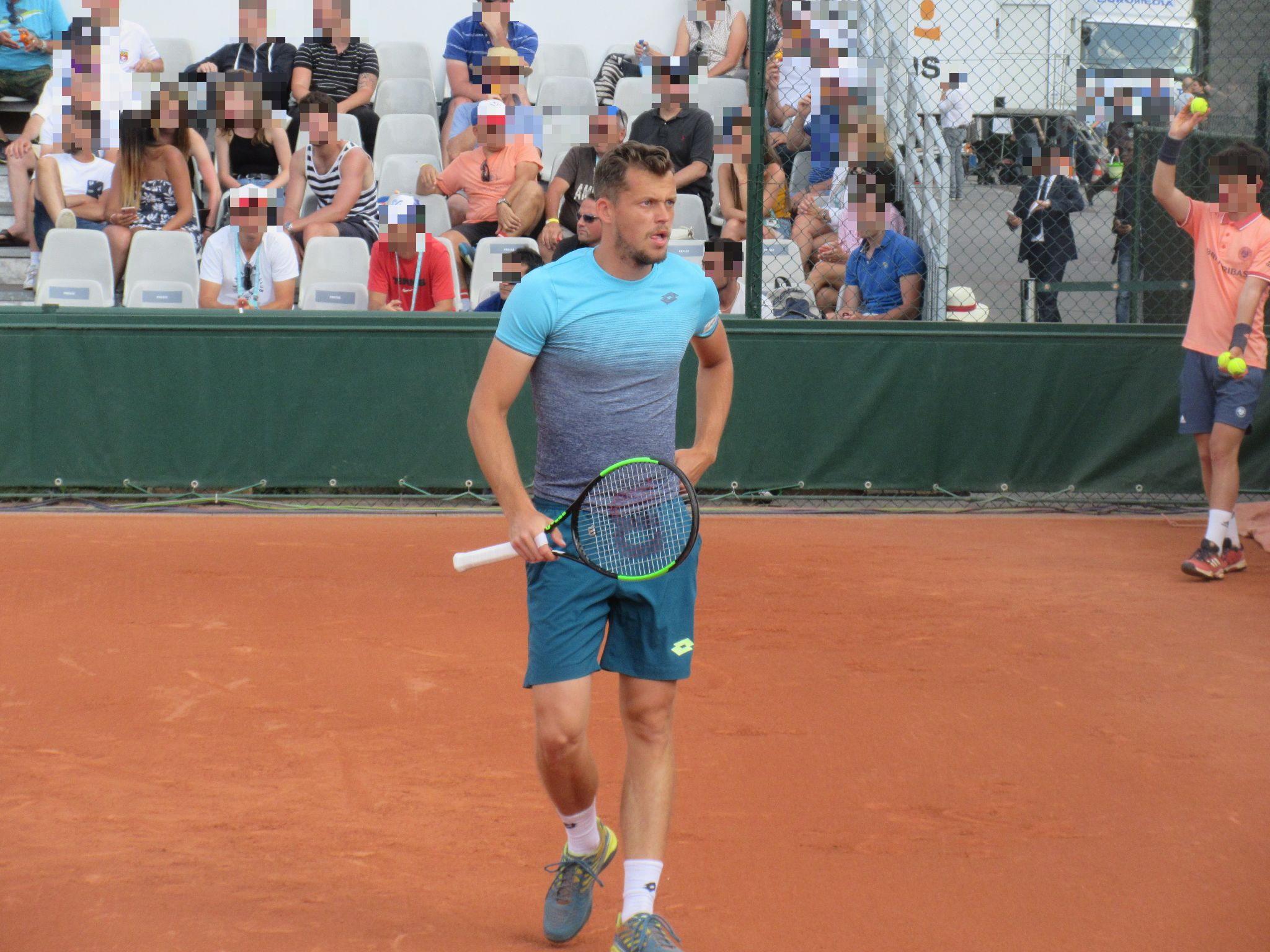
Adam Pavlásek at the 2018 French Open

Pavlásek made the semifinals at 2012 Australian Open and 2012 French Open and quarterfinal at 2011 US Open in singles. He also made two Grand Slam finals at 2012 Australian Open and 2012 French Open in doubles.

As a junior, Pavlásek posted a 72–40 win–loss record in singles, 66–36 in doubles and reached the No. 7 combined world ranking in 2012.

== Professional career ==
=== Singles ===
==== 2015: First Challenger title ====
At the start of 2015, Pavlásek replaced injured countryman Radek Štěpánek in the Hopman Cup, playing alongside Lucie Šafářová. He made a name for himself by defeating world No. 20 Fabio Fognini of Italy, Pavlásek's first ever win over a top 20 player.

Pavlásek won his first singles title at the Poprad Tatry Challenger.

==== 2016: Top 100, ATP and Grand Slam debuts ====
Pavlásek made his Grand Slam debut at the 2016 French Open as a lucky loser and recorded his first Major win over Roberto Carballes Baena.

He made his top 100 debut on 12 June 2016 following his 2016 Sparta Prague Open Challenger title.

He made his ATP Tour debut at 2016 Generali Open Kitzbühel, defeating Máximo González and Marcel Granollers to make his first ATP-level quarterfinal, where he lost to Nikoloz Basilashvili.

==== 2017: Wimbledon debut and first win ====
He made his Wimbledon debut and defeated Ernesto Escobedo, his second Major win, before losing to fourth seed Novak Djokovic.

=== Doubles ===
==== 2023: ATP debut & first final, Wimbledon quarterfinal ====
He made his doubles debut at the 2023 French Open and recorded his first Major doubles win partnering Ariel Behar over Albert Ramos Viñolas and Bernabe Zapata Miralles.

At the 2023 Wimbledon Championships he reached the quarterfinals of a Major for the first time with Behar defeating former Wimbledon champions, ninth seeded pair of Nikola Mektić and Mate Pavić before losing to eventual champions Wesley Koolhof and Neal Skupski.

He reached his first ATP final with Behar at the 2023 European Open but lost to the Tsitsipas brothers.

==== 2024: Two Masters finals, Olympics semifinal, top 30 ====
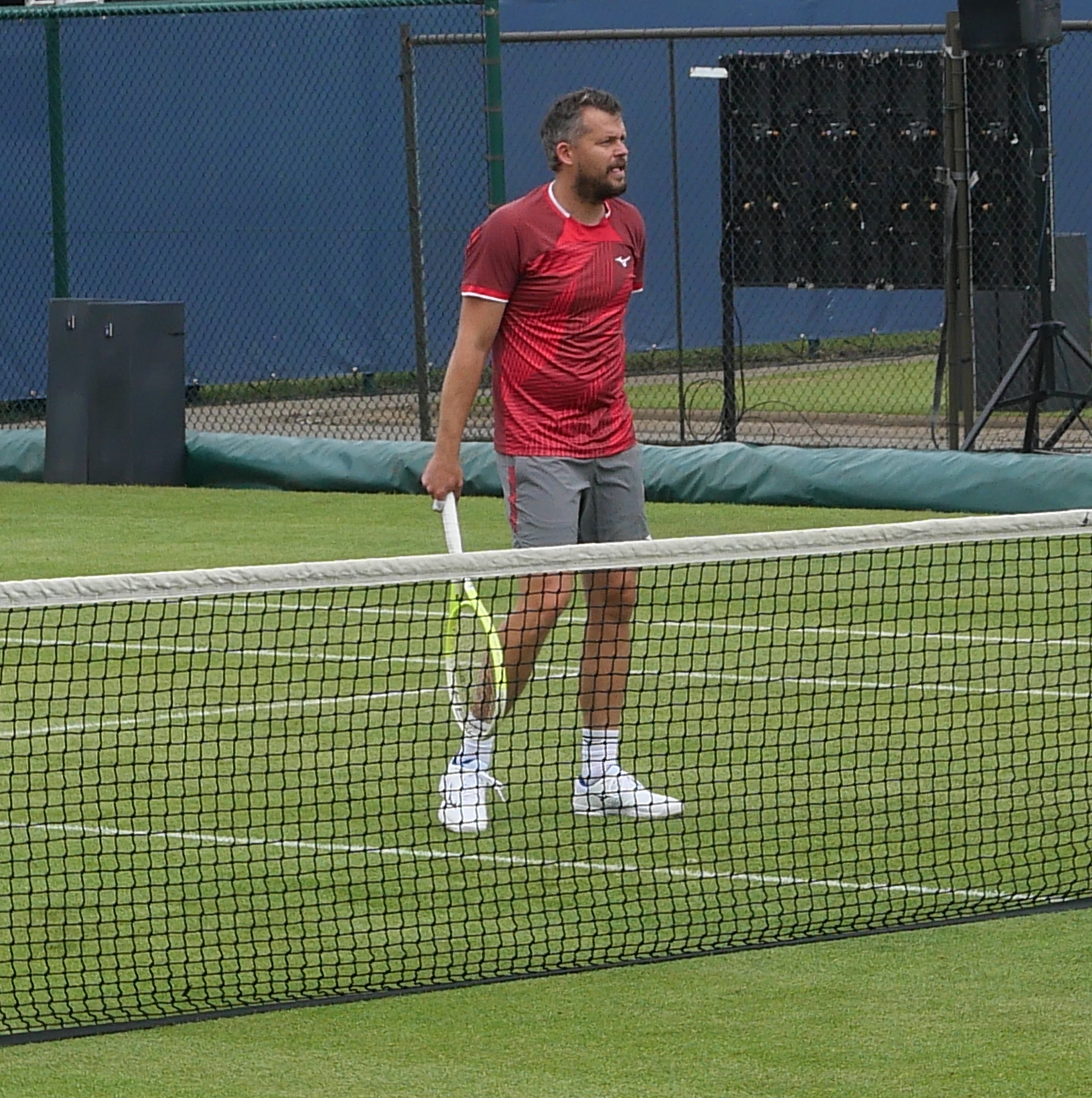
Pavlásek at the 2026 Libéma Open

At the Australian Open he made the quarterfinals with Behar. As a result, he reached the top 50 in the doubles rankings on 29 January 2024. The Uruguayan-Czech team upset fifth seeds Santiago González and Neal Skupski in three sets to advance and face next, first time doubles quarterfinalists newly formed Chinese-Czech duo of Zhang Zhizhen and Tomáš Macháč.

Ranked No. 40 at the Madrid Open, he reached his first Masters final with Behar, defeating tenth seeds Marcelo Arevalo and Mate Pavić, third seeds Joe Salisbury and Neal Skupski, 15th seeds Nathaniel Lammons and Jackson Withrow and second seeds Marcel Granollers and Horacio Zeballos by walkover. As a result, he reached the top 35 in the rankings. They lost in the final to Sebastian Korda and Jordan Thompson.

At the Paris Masters where he partnered for the first time with Lloyd Glasspool, the unseeded alternate pair reached the final with wins over fifth seeded Italian duo Simone Bolelli and Andrea Vavassori, local favorites Sadio Doumbia and Fabien Reboul, and US Open titlists and fourth seeded Australian duo Max Purcell and Jordan Thompson. They lost the final to Wesley Koolhof and Nikola Mektić in a deciding champions tiebreak.

==== 2026: First ATP title ====
In July, partnering with Patrik Rikl, Pavlásek won his first ATP doubles title at the 2026 Croatia Open Umag by defeating David Stevenson and Marcus Willis in the final with a score of 6–3, 4–6, [10–6].

== Performance timelines ==
Key
W	F	SF	QF	#R	RR	Q#	P#	DNQ	A	Z#	PO	G	S	B	NMS	NTI	P	NH

(W) winner; (F) finalist; (SF) semifinalist; (QF) quarterfinalist; (#R) rounds 4, 3, 2, 1; (RR) round-robin stage; (Q#) qualification round; (P#) preliminary round; (DNQ) did not qualify; (A) absent; (Z#) Davis/Fed Cup Zonal Group (with number indication) or (PO) play-off; (G) gold, (S) silver or (B) bronze Olympic/Paralympic medal; (NMS) not a Masters tournament; (NTI) not a Tier I tournament; (P) postponed; (NH) not held; (SR) strike rate (events won / competed); (W–L) win–loss record.
To avoid confusion and double counting, these charts are updated at the conclusion of a tournament or when the player's participation has ended.

=== Doubles ===
Current through the 2026 US Open.

Tournament	2015	2016	2017	2018	...	2022	2023	2024	2025	2026	SR	W–L	Win %
Grand Slam tournaments
Australian Open	A	A	A	A		A	A	QF	2R	3R	0 / 3	6–3	75%
French Open	A	A	A	A		A	2R	1R	3R	3R	0 / 2	5–4	75%
Wimbledon	A	A	A	A		A	QF	1R	3R	3R	0 / 3	7–4	50%
US Open	A	A	A	A		A	2R	3R	3R	2R	0 / 3	6–4	63%
Win–Loss	0–0	0–0	0–0	0–0		0–0	5–3	5–4	7–4	7–4	0 / 11	24–15	67%
National representation
Davis Cup	1R	A	1R	PO		A	QF	RR	QF		0 / 5		71%
Summer Olympics	NH	A	Not Held			Not Held		4th	Not Held		0 / 1	3–2	50%
ATP 1000 tournaments
Indian Wells Open	A	A	A	A		A	A	A	2R	A	0 / 1	1–1	50%
Miami Open	A	A	A	A		A	A	1R	2R	A	0 / 2	1–2	88%
Monte-Carlo Masters	A	A	A	A		A	A	A	A	A	0 / 0	0–0	–
Madrid Open	A	A	A	A		A	A	F	1R	A	0 / 2	3–2	70%
Italian Open	A	A	A	A		A	A	1R	2R	1R	0 / 3	1–3	40%
Canadian Open	A	A	A	A		A	A	A	A	2R	0 / 1	1–1	67%
Cincinnati Open	A	A	A	A		A	A	A	1R	2R	0 / 2	1–2	60%
Shanghai Masters	A	A	A	A		NH	A	SF	1R		0 / 2	3–2	67%
Paris Masters	A	A	A	A		A	A	F	2R		0 / 2	5–2	–
Win–Loss	0–0	0–0	0–0	0–0		0–0	0–0	10–5	4–7	2–3	1 / 17	16–15	65%
Career statistics
	2015	2016	2017	2018	...	2022	2023	2024	2025	2026	SR	W–L	Win %
Tournaments	0	0	0	0		2	12	27	25	19	Career total: 84		
Titles	0	0	0	0		0	0	0	0	1	Career total: 1		
Finals	0	0	0	0		0	1	2	2	2	Career total: 7		
Hard Win–Loss	2–0	0–0	0–0	0–0		1–2	11–8	20–18	12–15	5–8	0 / 45	51–51	65%
Clay Win–Loss	0–0	0–0	0–1	1–0		0–0	4–5	9–10	9–8	13–6	1 / 29	36–30	63%
Grass Win–Loss	0–0	0–0	0–0	0–0		0–0	3–1	0–3	3–2	6–4	0 / 10	12–10	44%
Overall Win–Loss	2–0	0–0	0–1	1–0		0–0	18–14	29–31	24–25	24–18	1 / 84	99–91	62%
Win %	44%	44%	44%	44%		44%	44%	44%	44%	44%	Career total: 62%		
Year-end ranking	340	1218	n/a	477		93	56	29	51				

== Significant finals ==
=== ATP 1000 tournaments ===
==== Doubles: 2 (2 runner-ups) ====
Outcome	Year	Tournament	Surface	Partner	Opponents	Score
Loss	2024	Madrid Open	Clay	(Uruguay) Ariel Behar	(United States) Sebastian Korda (Australia) Jordan Thompson	3–6, 6–7^{(7–9)}
Loss	2024	Paris Masters	Hard (i)	(United Kingdom) Lloyd Glasspool	(Netherlands) Wesley Koolhof (Croatia) Nikola Mektić	6–3, 3–6, [5–10]

=== Summer Olympics ===
==== Doubles: 1 (1 4th place) ====
Result	Year	Tournament	Surface	Partner	Opponents	Score
4th place	2024	2024 Summer Olympics, France	Clay	(Czech Republic) Tomáš Macháč	(United States) Taylor Fritz (United States) Tommy Paul	3–6, 4–6

== ATP Tour finals ==
=== Doubles: 7 (1 title, 6 runner-ups) ===
Legend ATP 1000 (0–2) ATP 500 (0–1) ATP 250 (1–3)	Finals by surface Hard (0–3) Clay (1–3)

Result	W–L	Date	Tournament	Tier	Surface	Partner	Opponents	Score
Loss	0–1	Oct 2023	European Open, Belgium	ATP 250	Hard (i)	(Uruguay) Ariel Behar	(Greece) Petros Tsitsipas (Greece) Stefanos Tsitsipas	7–6^{(7–5)}, 4–6, [8–10]
Loss	0–2	Apr 2024	Madrid Open, Spain	ATP 1000	Clay	(Uruguay) Ariel Behar	(United States) Sebastian Korda (Australia) Jordan Thompson	3–6, 6–7^{(7–9)}
Loss	0–3	Nov 2024	Paris Masters, France	ATP 1000	Hard (i)	(United Kingdom) Lloyd Glasspool	(Netherlands) Wesley Koolhof (Croatia) Nikola Mektić	6–3, 3–6, [5–10]
Loss	0–4	Jul 2025	Swedish Open, Sweden	ATP 250	Clay	(Poland) Jan Zieliński	(Argentina) Guido Andreozzi (Netherlands) Sander Arends	7–6^{(7–4)}, 5–7, [6–10]
Loss	0–5	Oct 2025	Swiss Indoors, Switzerland	500 Series	Hard (i)	(Poland) Jan Zieliński	(Spain) Marcel Granollers (Argentina) Horacio Zeballos	2–6, 5–7
Loss	0–6	Apr 2026	Țiriac Open, Romania	ATP 250	Clay	(Czech Republic) Patrik Rikl	(France) Sadio Doumbia (France) Fabien Reboul	1–6, 4–6
Win	1–6	Jul 2026	Croatia Open, Croatia	ATP 250	Clay	(Czech Republic) Patrik Rikl	(United Kingdom) David Stevenson (United Kingdom) Marcus Willis	6–3, 4–6, [10–6]

== Challenger and Futures finals ==
=== Singles: 16 (10–6) ===
Legend (singles) ATP Challenger Tour (4–6) ITF Futures Tour (6–0)	Titles by surface Hard (4–2) Clay (6–4) Grass (0–0) Carpet (0–0)

Result	W–L	Date	Tournament	Tier	Surface	Opponent	Score
Win	1–0	Jul 2012	Czech Republic F6, Liberec	Futures	Hard	(Czech Republic) Jiří Veselý	3–6, 7–6^{(7–3)}, 6–0
Win	2–0	Sep 2012	Turkey F37, Antalya	Futures	Hard	(Moldova) Andrei Ciumac	6–1, 6–3
Win	3–0	Aug 2013	Poland F2, Olsztyn	Futures	Clay	(Monaco) Benjamin Balleret	6–2, 5–7, 7–6^{(7–5)}
Win	4–0	Oct 2013	Turkey F39, Antalya	Futures	Hard	(Netherlands) Miliaan Niesten	6–1, 6–4
Win	5–0	Mar 2014	Italy F5, Santa Margherita di Pula	Futures	Clay	(Belgium) Arthur De Greef	6–3, 6–3
Win	6–0	May 2014	Egypt F18, Sharm El Sheikh	Futures	Hard	(Belgium) Germain Gigounon	2–6, 6–0, 6–2
Loss	6–1	May 2015	Ostrava, Czech Republic	Challenger	Clay	(Spain) Íñigo Cervantes Huegun	6–7^{(5–7)}, 4–6
Loss	6–2	May 2015	Rome, Italy	Challenger	Clay	(United Kingdom) Aljaž Bedene	5–7, 2–6
Win	7–2	Jun 2015	Poprad-Tatry, Slovakia	Challenger	Clay	(Chile) Hans Podlipnik Castillo	6–2, 3–6, 6–3
Loss	7–3	Jan 2016	Bangkok, Thailand	Challenger	Hard	(Russia) Mikhail Youzhny	4–6, 1–6
Loss	7–4	Feb 2016	Cherbourg, France	Challenger	Hard (i)	(Australia) Jordan Thompson	6–4, 4–6, 1–6
Loss	7–5	Apr 2016	Barletta, Italy	Challenger	Clay	(Sweden) Elias Ymer	5–7, 4–6
Win	8–5	Jun 2016	Prague, Czech Republic	Challenger	Clay	(France) Stéphane Robert	6–4, 3–6, 6–3
Loss	8–6	Jul 2016	Scheveningen, Netherlands	Challenger	Clay	(Netherlands) Robin Haase	4–6, 7–6^{(11–9)}, 2–6
Win	9–6	Sep 2016	Banja Luka, Bosnia/Herzegovina	Challenger	Clay	(Serbia) Miljan Zekić	3–6, 6–1, 6–4
Win	10–6	May 2018	Rome, Italy	Challenger	Clay	(Serbia) Laslo Đere	7–6^{(7–1)}, 6–7^{(9–11)}, 6–4

=== Doubles: 21 (7–14) ===
Legend (doubles) ATP Challenger Tour (6–12) ITF Futures Tour (1–2)	Titles by surface Hard (2–3) Clay (5–11) Grass (0–0) Carpet (0–0)

Result	W–L	Date	Tournament	Tier	Surface	Partner	Opponents	Score
Loss	0–1	May 2012	Ostrava, Czech Republic	Challenger	Clay	(Czech Republic) Jiří Veselý	(Moldova) Radu Albot (Russia) Teymuraz Gabashvili	5–7, 7–5, [8–10]
Win	1–1	Jul 2012	Czech Republic F4, Prostějov	Futures	Clay	(Czech Republic) Jiří Veselý	(Italy) Riccardo Bellotti (Austria) Dominic Thiem	7–6^{(7–2)}, 6–3
Loss	1–2	Sep 2012	Poland F6, Legnica	Futures	Clay	(Czech Republic) Jan Šátral	(Poland) Marcin Gawron (Poland) Grzegorz Panfil	w/o
Loss	1–3	Apr 2014	Turkey F11, Antalya	Futures	Hard	(Switzerland) Luca Margaroli	(France) Rémi Boutillier (Benin) Alexis Klégou	3–6, 6–3, [7–10]
Win	2–3	Jul 2014	Poznań, Poland	Challenger	Clay	(Moldova) Radu Albot	(Poland) Tomasz Bednarek (Finland) Henri Kontinen	7–5, 2–6, [10–8]
Loss	2–4	Nov 2014	Bratislava, Slowakei	Challenger	Hard (i)	(Slovakia) Norbert Gombos	(United Kingdom) Ken Skupski (United Kingdom) Neal Skupski	3–6, 6–7^{(3–7)}
Loss	2–5	Jun 2015	Poprad-Tatry, Slovakia	Challenger	Clay	(Slovakia) Norbert Gombos	(Czech Republic) Roman Jebavý (Czech Republic) Jan Šátral	2–6, 2–6
Win	3–5	Jan 2019	Koblenz, Germany	Challenger	Hard (i)	(Czech Republic) Zdeněk Kolář	(Austria) Jürgen Melzer (Slovakia) Filip Polášek	6–3, 6–4
Loss	3–6	May 2019	Rome, Italy	Challenger	Clay	(Serbia) Nikola Čačić	(Slovakia) Filip Polášek (Austria) Philipp Oswald	w/o
Loss	3–7	Apr 2022	Oeiras, Portugal	Challenger	Clay	(Czech Republic) Zdeněk Kolář	(Portugal) Nuno Borges (Portugal) Francisco Cabral	4-6, 0–6
Win	4–7	Apr 2022	Madrid, Spain	Challenger	Clay	(Slovakia) Igor Zelenay	(Brazil) Rafael Matos (Spain) David Vega Hernández	6–3, 3–6, [10–6]
Loss	4–8	May 2022	Prague, Czech Republic	Challenger	Clay	(Czech Republic) Andrew Paulson	(Portugal) Nuno Borges (Portugal) Francisco Cabral	4-6, 7-6^{(7–3)}, [5-10]
Win	5–8	May 2022	Zagreb, Croatia	Challenger	Clay	(Slovakia) Igor Zelenay	(Croatia) Domagoj Bilješko; Andrey Chepelev	4–6, 6–3, [10–2]
Loss	5–9	May 2022	Poznan, Poland	Challenger	Clay	(Czech Republic) Marek Gengel	(United States) Hunter Reese (Poland) Szymon Walków	6-1, 3–6, [6-10]
Loss	5–10	Jul 2022	Braunschweig, Germany	Challenger	Clay	(Czech Republic) Roman Jebavý	(Brazil) Marcelo Demoliner (Germany) Jan-Lennard Struff	4-6, 5–7
Win	6–10	Jul 2022	Zug, Switzerland	Challenger	Clay	(Czech Republic) Zdeněk Kolář	(Poland) Karol Drzewiecki (Finland) Patrik Niklas-Salminen	6–3, 7–5
Loss	6–11	Aug 2022	Liberec, Czech Republic	Challenger	Clay	(Czech Republic) Roman Jebavý	(Austria) Neil Oberleitner (Austria) Philipp Oswald	6-7^{(5–7)}, 2–6
Loss	6–12	Sep 2022	Szczecin, Poland	Challenger	Clay	(Czech Republic) Roman Jebavý	(Jamaica) Dustin Brown (Italy) Andrea Vavassori	4–6, 7–5, [8–10]
Loss	6–13	Sep 2022	Genoa, Italy	Challenger	Clay	(Czech Republic) Roman Jebavý	(Jamaica) Dustin Brown (Italy) Andrea Vavassori	2–6, 2–6
Win	7–13	Jan 2023	Nonthaburi, Thailand	Challenger	Hard	(Czech Republic) Marek Gengel	(United States) Robert Galloway (Mexico) Hans Hach Verdugo	7–6^{(7–4)}, 6–4
Loss	7–14	Jan 2023	Ottignies-Louvain-la-Neuve, Belgium	Challenger	Hard (i)	(Czech Republic) Roman Jebavý	(Monaco) Romain Arneodo (Austria) Tristan-Samuel Weissborn	4–6, 3–6
