= Poprad-Tatry ATP Challenger Tour =

Poprad-Tatry Challenger

Defunct tennis tournament
- Location: Poprad, Slovakia
- Venue: Tenisove Kurty Mesta Poprad
- Category: ATP Challenger Tour
- Surface: Clay / Outdoors
- Draw: 32S/32Q/16D
- Prize money: €42,500 +H
- Website: Official website

The Poprad-Tatry Challenger was a tennis tournament held in Poprad, Slovakia since 2015 to 2018. The event was part of the ATP Challenger Tour and was played on outdoor clay courts. In 2019 the tournament was moved to Bratislava under a new name, the Bratislava Open.

== Past finals ==
=== Singles ===
Year	Champion	Runner-up	Score
2018	(Slovakia) Jozef Kovalík	(Belgium) Arthur De Greef	6–4, 6–0
2017	(Germany) Cedrik-Marcel Stebe	(Serbia) Laslo Đere	6–0, 6–3
2016	(Argentina) Horacio Zeballos	(Austria) Gerald Melzer	6–3, 6–4
2015	(Czech Republic) Adam Pavlásek	(Chile) Hans Podlipnik Castillo	6–2, 3–6, 6–3

=== Doubles ===
Year	Champions	Runners-up	Score
2018	(Bosnia and Herzegovina) Tomislav Brkić (Croatia) Ante Pavić	(Serbia) Nikola Čačić (Switzerland) Luca Margaroli	6–3, 4–6, [16–14]
2017	(Poland) Mateusz Kowalczyk (Germany) Andreas Mies	(Switzerland) Luca Margaroli (Austria) Tristan-Samuel Weissborn	6–3, 7–6^{(7–3)}
2016	(Uruguay) Ariel Behar (Kazakhstan) Andrey Golubev	(Czech Republic) Lukáš Dlouhý (Slovakia) Andrej Martin	6–2, 5–7, [10–5]
2015	(Czech Republic) Roman Jebavý (Czech Republic) Jan Šátral	(Slovakia) Norbert Gombos (Czech Republic) Adam Pavlásek	6–2, 6–2
