= 2012 SDA Tennis Open – Singles =

Singles
- 2012 SDA Tennis Open

Final
- Champion: (Netherlands) Thiemo de Bakker
- Runner-up: (Romania) Victor Hănescu
- Score: 6–4, 3–6, 7–5

Events
Singles	Doubles
← 2011 ·	SDA Tennis Open	· 2013 →

Thiemo de Bakker won the first edition of the tournament 6–4, 3–6, 7–5 in the final against Victor Hănescu.

== Seeds ==
1. (Belgium) Steve Darcis (first round)
2. (Belgium) Olivier Rochus (first round)
3. (Romania) Victor Hănescu (final)
4. (Argentina) Facundo Bagnis (first round)
5. (Argentina) Máximo González (first round)
6. (France) Nicolas Devilder (quarterfinals)
7. (Germany) Mischa Zverev (first round)
8. (Argentina) Diego Junqueira (first round)

== Draw ==
=== Key ===
- Q = Qualifier
- WC = Wild card
- LL = Lucky loser
- Alt = Alternate
- SE = Special exempt
- PR = Protected ranking
- ITF = ITF entry
- JE = Junior exempt
- w/o = Walkover
- r = Retired
- d = Defaulted
- SR = Special ranking

=== Finals ===
Semifinals
(Belgium) Yannick Mertens	3	3
3	(Romania) Victor Hănescu	6	6
(France) Stéphane Robert	3	4
(Netherlands) Thiemo de Bakker	6	6

Final
3	(Romania) Victor Hănescu	4	6	5
(Netherlands) Thiemo de Bakker	6	3	7

=== Top half ===
First round
1	(Belgium) S Darcis	7^{8}	4	6^{4}
(Slovakia) P Červenák	6^{6}	6	7^{7}
(Austria) M Linzer	2	6^{2}
(Canada) S Diez	6	7^{7}
WC	(Belgium) A De Greef	7^{16}	6
Q	(Belgium) Alexandre Folie	6^{14}	4
(Belgium) Y Mertens	6	6
5	(Argentina) M González	2	1
3	(Romania) V Hănescu	6	6
(Italy) A Arnaboldi	0	3
Q	(Sweden) M Eriksson	7^{7}	4	1
Q	(United Kingdom) D Smethurst	6^{4}	6	6
(Moldova) R Albot	6	6
Q	(Switzerland) Riccardo Maiga	3	2
(North Macedonia) D Grabuloski	1	4
6	(France) N Devilder	6	6

Second round
(Slovakia) P Červenák	3	6	3
(Canada) S Diez	6	1	6
WC	(Belgium) A De Greef	7^{7}	3	1
(Belgium) Y Mertens	6^{5}	6	6
3	(Romania) V Hănescu	6	6
Q	(United Kingdom) D Smethurst	0	4
(Moldova) R Albot	6^{3}	6^{1}
6	(France) N Devilder	7^{7}	7^{7}

Quarterfinals
(Canada) S Diez	1	2
(Belgium) Y Mertens	6	6
3	(Romania) V Hănescu	6	6
6	(France) N Devilder	4	2

Semifinals
(Belgium) Y Mertens	3	3
3	(Romania) V Hănescu	6	6

=== Bottom half ===
First round
7	(Germany) M Zverev	3	4
(Argentina) M Trungelliti	6	6
(Serbia) D Lajović	3	4
(Netherlands) T Schoorel	6	6
(France) S Robert	4	6	6
(Netherlands) J Huta Galung	6	1	2
(Argentina) P Galdón	7	6
4	(Argentina) F Bagnis	5	3
8	(Argentina) D Junqueira	4	0
WC	(Belgium) G Gigounon	6	6
(Netherlands) T de Bakker	6	6
WC	(Belgium) Y Reuter	3	0
(Brazil) A Ghem	4	6	6
(Netherlands) N van der Meer	6	3	4
SE	(Netherlands) M Middelkoop	6	6
2	(Belgium) O Rochus	3	4

Second round
(Argentina) M Trungelliti	3	2
(Netherlands) T Schoorel	6	6
(France) S Robert	6	6
(Argentina) P Galdón	3	3
WC	(Belgium) G Gigounon	6	1	2
(Netherlands) T de Bakker	4	6	6
(Brazil) A Ghem	6	3	6
SE	(Netherlands) M Middelkoop	3	6	2

Quarterfinals
(Netherlands) T Schoorel	1	2
(France) S Robert	6	6
(Netherlands) T de Bakker	6	6
(Brazil) A Ghem	4	4

Semifinals
(France) S Robert	3	4
(Netherlands) T de Bakker	6	6
