= 2012 SDA Tennis Open =

- Date: 16–22 July
- Edition: 1st
- Surface: Clay
- Location: Bercuit, Belgium

Champions

Singles
- (Netherlands) Thiemo de Bakker

Doubles
- (Brazil) André Ghem / (Argentina) Marco Trungelliti
- SDA Tennis Open

The 2012 SDA Tennis Open was a professional tennis tournament played on clay courts. It was the first edition of the tournament which was part of the 2012 ATP Challenger Tour. It took place in Bercuit, Belgium between 16 and 22 July 2012.

== Singles main draw entrants ==
=== Seeds ===
Country	Player	Rank^{1}	Seed
BEL	Steve Darcis	75	1
BEL	Olivier Rochus	104	2
ROU	Victor Hănescu	140	3
ARG	Facundo Bagnis	167	4
ARG	Máximo González	170	5
FRA	Nicolas Devilder	177	6
GER	Mischa Zverev	178	7
ARG	Diego Junqueira	182	8

- ^{1} Rankings are as of July 9, 2012.

=== Other entrants ===
The following players received wildcards into the singles main draw:

- (Belgium) Arthur De Greef
- (Belgium) Germain Gigounon
- (North Macedonia) Dimitar Grabuloski
- (Belgium) Yannik Reuter

The following players received entry as a special exempt into the singles main draw:

- (Netherlands) Matwé Middelkoop

The following players received entry from the qualifying draw:

- (Sweden) Markus Eriksson
- (Belgium) Alexandre Folie
- (Switzerland) Riccardo Maiga
- (United Kingdom) Daniel Smethurst

== Champions ==
=== Singles ===
- (Netherlands) Thiemo de Bakker def. (Romania) Victor Hănescu, 6–4, 3–6, 7–5

=== Doubles ===
- (Brazil) André Ghem / (Argentina) Marco Trungelliti def. (Argentina) Facundo Bagnis / (Argentina) Pablo Galdón, 6–1, 6–2
