= 2016 Vivo Tennis Cup – Singles =

Singles
- 2016 Vivo Tennis Cup

Final
- Champion: (Argentina) Facundo Bagnis
- Runner-up: (Brazil) Guilherme Clezar
- Score: 6–4, 4–6, 6–2

Events
Singles	Doubles
- Vivo Tennis Cup

Facundo Bagnis won his 7th career ATP Challenger Tour title, beating Guilherme Clezar 6–4, 4–6, 6–2

== Seeds ==
1. (Argentina) Horacio Zeballos (withdrew)
2. (Spain) Roberto Carballés Baena (first round)
3. (Brazil) Rogério Dutra Silva (second round)
4. (Argentina) Facundo Bagnis (champion)
5. (Portugal) Gastão Elias (quarterfinals)
6. (Argentina) Facundo Argüello (quarterfinals)
7. (Austria) Gerald Melzer (first round)
8. (Slovakia) Andrej Martin (quarterfinals)

== Draw ==
Key

- Q = Qualifier
- WC = Wild card
- LL = Lucky loser
- Alt = Alternate
- ITF = ITF entry
- PR = Protected ranking
- SR = Special ranking
- SE = Special exempt
- JE = Junior exempt
- JR = Junior Accelerator Programme entrant
- CO = College Accelerator Programme entrant
- NG = Next Gen Accelerator Program entrant
- w/o = Walkover
- r = Retired
- d = Defaulted

=== Finals ===
Semifinals
(Spain) Rubén Ramírez Hidalgo	3	3
(Brazil) Guilherme Clezar	6	6
4	(Argentina) Facundo Bagnis	6	3	6
WC	(Brazil) Thiago Monteiro	3	6	3

Final
(Brazil) Guilherme Clezar	4	6	2
4	(Argentina) Facundo Bagnis	6	4	6

=== Top half ===
First round
Q	(Germany) P Torebko	5	7	7^{7}
(Argentina) N Kicker	7	5	6^{4}
(Brazil) J Pereira	6	6
Q	(Belgium) Clément Geens	1	3
(Spain) R Ramírez Hidalgo	7	6
Q	(Argentina) A Collarini	5	3
LL	(Brazil) F Neis	7^{7}	7
7	(Austria) G Melzer	6^{2}	5
3	(Brazil) R Dutra Silva	5	6	6
(Belgium) A De Greef	7	2	4
(Ecuador) G Lapentti	1	4
(Brazil) G Clezar	6	6
(Argentina) G Andreozzi	6	6
(Spain) P Riba	4	4
(Brazil) J Souza	2	4
8	(Slovakia) A Martin	6	6

Second round
Q	(Germany) P Torebko	6^{4}	7^{7}	5
(Brazil) J Pereira	7^{7}	6^{5}	2^{r}
(Spain) R Ramírez Hidalgo	6	6
LL	(Brazil) F Neis	3	1
3	(Brazil) R Dutra Silva	3	2
(Brazil) G Clezar	6	6
(Argentina) G Andreozzi	6	4	5
8	(Slovakia) A Martin	2	6	7

Quarterfinals
Q	(Germany) P Torebko	3	2
(Spain) R Ramírez Hidalgo	6	6
(Brazil) G Clezar	6	7
8	(Slovakia) A Martin	2	5

Semifinals
(Spain) R Ramírez Hidalgo	3	3
(Brazil) G Clezar	6	6

=== Bottom half ===
First round
5	(Portugal) G Elias	3	7^{7}	6
(France) J Eysseric	6	6^{3}	3
(Argentina) P Cachin	6	3	7^{7}
(Brazil) A Ghem	4	6	6^{3}
(Sweden) C Lindell	6	6
WC	(Brazil) Wilson Leite	2	2
(El Salvador) M Arévalo	4	1
4	(Argentina) F Bagnis	6	6
6	(Argentina) F Argüello	6	6
Q	(Ecuador) G Escobar	3	2
WC	(Brazil) Carlos Eduardo Severino	3	4
WC	(Brazil) P Sakamoto	6	6
(Argentina) M González	1	4
WC	(Brazil) T Monteiro	6	6
Alt	(France) A Michon	1	7	7
2	(Spain) R Carballés Baena	6	5	5

Second round
5	(Portugal) G Elias	6	6
(Argentina) P Cachin	2	4
(Sweden) C Lindell	3	6	1
4	(Argentina) F Bagnis	6	3	6
6	(Argentina) F Argüello	6	7^{7}
WC	(Brazil) P Sakamoto	4	6^{5}
WC	(Brazil) T Monteiro	6	7^{7}
Alt	(France) A Michon	4	6^{3}

Quarterfinals
5	(Portugal) G Elias	2	7	5
4	(Argentina) F Bagnis	6	5	7
6	(Argentina) F Argüello	4	6	3
WC	(Brazil) T Monteiro	6	3	6

Semifinals
4	(Argentina) F Bagnis	6	3	6
WC	(Brazil) T Monteiro	3	6	3
