= 2016 Vivo Tennis Cup – Doubles =

Doubles
- 2016 Vivo Tennis Cup

Final
- Champions: (Portugal) Gastão Elias (Brazil) André Ghem
- Runners-up: (France) Jonathan Eysseric (Mexico) Miguel Ángel Reyes-Varela
- Score: 6–4, 7–6^{(7–2)}

Events
Singles	Doubles
Vivo Tennis Cup	· 2017 →

Gastão Elias and André Ghem won the title after defeating Jonathan Eysseric and Miguel Ángel Reyes-Varela 6–4, 7–6^{(7–2)} in the final.

== Seeds ==
1. (Slovakia) Andrej Martin / (Chile) Julio Peralta (quarterfinals)
2. (Argentina) Facundo Bagnis / (Argentina) Máximo González (semifinals)
3. (Argentina) Guido Andreozzi / (El Salvador) Marcelo Arévalo (withdrew, Quarterfinals)
4. (France) Jonathan Eysseric / (Mexico) Miguel Ángel Reyes-Varela (final)

== Draw ==
=== Key ===
- Q = Qualifier
- WC = Wild card
- LL = Lucky loser
- Alt = Alternate
- SE = Special exempt
- PR = Protected ranking
- ITF = ITF entry
- JE = Junior exempt
- w/o = Walkover
- r = Retired
- d = Defaulted
- SR = Special ranking

First round
1	(Slovakia) A Martin (Chile) J Peralta	6	6
(Peru) S Galdós (Sweden) C Lindell	4	4
(Spain) R Ramírez Hidalgo (Spain) P Riba	6	6
(Argentina) P Cachin (Spain) R Carballés Baena	4	0
3	(Argentina) G Andreozzi (El Salvador) M Arévalo	6	6
(Argentina) F Argüello (Argentina) A Collarini	1	3
WC	(Brazil) Wilson Leite (Brazil) Carlos Eduardo Severino	3	1
(Portugal) G Elias (Brazil) A Ghem	6	6
(Argentina) N Kicker (Brazil) J Pereira
(Brazil) R Dutra Silva (Ecuador) G Lapentti	w/o
(Brazil) G Clezar (Brazil) F Neis	4	7^{7}	[7]
4	(France) J Eysseric (Mexico) MÁ Reyes-Varela	6	6^{1}	[10]
WC	(Brazil) T Monteiro (Brazil) P Sakamoto	7	2	[6]
(Croatia) I Sabanov (Croatia) M Sabanov	5	6	[10]
Alt	(Belgium) Clement Geens (Germany) P Torebko	4	1
2	(Argentina) F Bagnis (Argentina) M González	6	6

Quarterfinals
1	(Slovakia) A Martin (Chile) J Peralta	4	6	[4]
(Spain) R Ramírez Hidalgo (Spain) P Riba	6	3	[10]
3	(Argentina) G Andreozzi (El Salvador) M Arévalo
(Portugal) G Elias (Brazil) A Ghem	w/o
(Brazil) R Dutra Silva (Ecuador) G Lapentti	4	2
4	(France) J Eysseric (Mexico) MÁ Reyes-Varela	6	6
(Croatia) I Sabanov (Croatia) M Sabanov	4	4
2	(Argentina) F Bagnis (Argentina) M González	6	6

Semifinals
(Spain) R Ramírez Hidalgo (Spain) P Riba	4	7^{8}	[10]
(Portugal) G Elias (Brazil) A Ghem	6	6^{6}	[12]
4	(France) J Eysseric (Mexico) MÁ Reyes-Varela	6	7^{7}
2	(Argentina) F Bagnis (Argentina) M González	4	6^{3}

Final
(Portugal) G Elias (Brazil) A Ghem	6	7^{7}
4	(France) J Eysseric (Mexico) MÁ Reyes-Varela	4	6^{2}
