= 2014 Copa Gobierno de Córdoba – Singles =

Singles
- 2014 Copa Gobierno de Córdoba

Final
- Champion: (Colombia) Alejandro González
- Runner-up: (Argentina) Máximo González
- Score: 7–5, 1–6, 6–3

Events
Singles	Doubles
- Copa Gobierno de Córdoba

This was the first edition of the tournament.

Alejandro González won the title by defeating Máximo González 7–5, 1–6, 6–3 in the final.

== Seeds ==
1. (Argentina) Diego Sebastián Schwartzman (second round)
2. (Colombia) Alejandro González (champion)
3. (Argentina) Horacio Zeballos (first round)
4. (Brazil) João Souza (second round)
5. (Argentina) Máximo González (final)
6. (Argentina) Facundo Bagnis (semifinals)
7. (Argentina) Facundo Argüello (quarterfinals)
8. (Australia) Jason Kubler (first round)

== Draw ==
Key

- Q = Qualifier
- WC = Wild card
- LL = Lucky loser
- Alt = Alternate
- ITF = ITF entry
- PR = Protected ranking
- SR = Special ranking
- SE = Special exempt
- JE = Junior exempt
- JR = Junior Accelerator Programme entrant
- CO = College Accelerator Programme entrant
- NG = Next Gen Accelerator Program entrant
- w/o = Walkover
- r = Retired
- d = Defaulted

=== Finals ===
Semifinals
5	(Argentina) Máximo González	6	6
WC	(Argentina) Pedro Cachin	4	2
6	(Argentina) Facundo Bagnis	4	6	5
2	(Colombia) Alejandro González	6	3	7

Final
5	(Argentina) Máximo González	5	6	3
2	(Colombia) Alejandro González	7	1	6

=== Top half ===
First round
1	(Argentina) D Schwartzman	6	6
(Argentina) G Andreozzi	4	4
(Argentina) JI Londero	7^{7}	3	5
(Dominican Republic) J Hernández	6^{3}	6	7
(Argentina) A Collarini	6	7
WC	(Argentina) T Lipovšek Puches	1	5
(France) G Mina	4	6^{3}
5	(Argentina) M González	6	7^{7}
3	(Argentina) H Zeballos	6^{4}	3
WC	(Argentina) P Cachin	7^{7}	6
(Belgium) A De Greef	1	3
(Argentina) Martín Alund	6	6
WC	(Argentina) R Olivo	7	2	7
(Argentina) Juan Ignacio Londero	5	6	5
(Chile) Gonzalo Lama	2	3
7	(Argentina) F Argüello	6	6

Second round
1	(Argentina) D Schwartzman	6^{3}	3
Q	(Argentina) M Trungelliti	7^{7}	6
(Argentina) A Collarini	3	6	2
5	(Argentina) M González	6	3	6
WC	(Argentina) P Cachin	6	6
(Argentina) Martín Alund	4	2
WC	(Argentina) R Olivo	4	5
7	(Argentina) F Argüello	6	7

Quarterfinals
Q	(Argentina) M Trungelliti	2	0^{r}
5	(Argentina) M González	6	4
WC	(Argentina) P Cachin	6	6
7	(Argentina) F Argüello	4	2

Semifinals
5	(Argentina) M González	6	6
WC	(Argentina) P Cachin	4	2

=== Bottom half ===
First round
6	(Argentina) F Bagnis	6	3	6
WC	(Argentina) F Coria	3	6	4
(Spain) R Ramírez Hidalgo	4	6
(Brazil) G Clezar	6	3	4
(Bosnia and Herzegovina) T Brkić	3	6	1
(Chile) H Podlipnik	6	4	6
(Spain) J Samper Montaña	1	6	3
4	(Brazil) J Souza	6	3	6
8	(Australia) J Kubler	4	6	4
(Brazil) A Ghem	6	2	6
Q	(Bolivia) H Dellien	3	4
(Argentina) A Molteni	6	6
(Argentina) G Pella	5	6	6
Q	(Uruguay) M Cuevas	7	3	4
Q	(Dominican Republic) J Hernández	2	5
2	(Colombia) A González	6	7

Second round
6	(Argentina) F Bagnis	6	6
(Spain) R Ramírez Hidalgo	4	4
(Chile) H Podlipnik	6	6
4	(Brazil) J Souza	4	3	6
(Brazil) A Ghem	6	7
(Argentina) A Molteni	4	5
(Argentina) G Pella	4	3
2	(Colombia) A González	6	6

Quarterfinals
6	(Argentina) F Bagnis	6	6
(Chile) H Podlipnik	3	4
(Brazil) A Ghem	3	2
2	(Colombia) A González	6	6

Semifinals
6	(Argentina) F Bagnis	4	6	5
2	(Colombia) A González	6	3	7
