= 2016 Racket Club Open =

- Date: 11–17 January
- Edition: 1st
- Draw: 32S / 16D
- Prize money: $50,000
- Surface: Clay
- Location: Buenos Aires, Argentina

Champions

Singles
- (Argentina) Facundo Bagnis

Doubles
- (Argentina) Facundo Bagnis / (Argentina) Máximo González
Racket Club Open	· 2017 →

The 2016 Racket Club Open was a professional tennis tournament played on clay courts. It was the first edition of the tournament which was part of the 2016 ATP Challenger Tour. It took place in Buenos Aires, Argentina between 11 and 17 January 2016.

== Singles main-draw entrants ==
=== Seeds ===
Country	Player	Rank^{1}	Seed
ARG	~~Horacio Zeballos~~	~~124~~	~~1~~
BRA	Rogério Dutra Silva	125	2
ESP	Roberto Carballés Baena	131	3
ARG	Facundo Argüello	137	4
ARG	Facundo Bagnis	140	5
BRA	João Souza	142	6
SVK	Andrej Martin	146	7
ARG	Máximo González	147	8

- ^{1} Rankings are as of January 4, 2016.

=== Other entrants ===
The following players received wildcards into the singles main draw:

- (France) Gianni Mina
- (Argentina) Andrés Molteni
- (Argentina) Santiago Rodríguez Taverna
- (Argentina) Matias Zukas

The following players received entry from the qualifying draw:

- (Argentina) Maximiliano Estévez
- (Uruguay) Martín Cuevas
- (Argentina) Agustín Velotti
- (Argentina) Franco Agamenone

The following players received entry as lucky losers:

- (Argentina) Hernán Casanova
- (Germany) Peter Torebko

== Champions ==
=== Singles ===
- (Argentina) Facundo Bagnis def. (Belgium) Arthur De Greef 6–3, 6–2

=== Doubles ===
- (Argentina) Facundo Bagnis / (Argentina) Máximo González def. (Peru) Sergio Galdós / (Sweden) Christian Lindell 6–1, 6–2
