= 2012 Copa Agco Cordoba – Singles =

Singles
- 2012 Copa Agco Cordoba

Final
- Champion: (France) Guillaume Rufin
- Runner-up: (Spain) Javier Martí
- Score: 6–2, 6–3

Events
Singles	Doubles
← 2011 ·	Copa Agco Cordoba	· 2013 →

Guillaume Rufin won the title, defeating Javier Martí 6–2, 6–3 in the final.

== Seeds ==
1. (Argentina) Leonardo Mayer (semifinals)
2. (Argentina) Horacio Zeballos (semifinals)
3. (France) Guillaume Rufin (champion)
4. (Brazil) Rogério Dutra da Silva (second round)
5. (Argentina) Martín Alund (quarterfinals)
6. (Chile) Paul Capdeville (first round, retired)
7. (Argentina) Facundo Bagnis (first round)
8. (Argentina) Guido Andreozzi (quarterfinals)

== Draw ==
=== Key ===
- Q = Qualifier
- WC = Wild card
- LL = Lucky loser
- Alt = Alternate
- SE = Special exempt
- PR = Protected ranking
- ITF = ITF entry
- JE = Junior exempt
- w/o = Walkover
- r = Retired
- d = Defaulted
- SR = Special ranking

=== Finals ===
Semifinals
1	(Argentina) Leonardo Mayer	4	1
3	(France) Guillaume Rufin	6	6
(Spain) Javier Martí	6	5	6
2	(Argentina) Horacio Zeballos	3	7	4

Final
3	(France) Guillaume Rufin	6	6
(Spain) Javier Martí	2	3

=== Top half ===
First round
1	(Argentina) L Mayer	6	6
(Argentina) S Decoud	1	4
(United States) D Zivkovic	4	2
(Argentina) D Junqueira	6	6
(Argentina) R Olivo	7^{7}	4	7
Q	(Netherlands) A van der Duim	6^{5}	6	5
(Spain) I Navarro	6	6
7	(Argentina) F Bagnis	4	4
3	(France) G Rufin	6	7
(France) S Robert	3	5
(Netherlands) B Westerhof	7	6
(Argentina) A Molteni	5	3
(Argentina) A Velotti	5	6	4
(Argentina) M Trungelliti	7	4	6
WC	(Argentina) Juan Ignacio Londero	4	1
8	(Argentina) G Andreozzi	6	6

Second round
1	(Argentina) L Mayer	4	6	6
(Argentina) D Junqueira	6	3	3
(Argentina) R Olivo	6	6
(Spain) I Navarro	3	2
3	(France) G Rufin	6	6
(Netherlands) B Westerhof	0	2
(Argentina) M Trungelliti	1	3
8	(Argentina) G Andreozzi	6	6

Quarterfinals
1	(Argentina) L Mayer	6	6
(Argentina) R Olivo	3	0
3	(France) G Rufin	6	7^{7}
8	(Argentina) G Andreozzi	2	6^{4}

Semifinals
1	(Argentina) L Mayer	4	1
3	(France) G Rufin	6	6

=== Bottom half ===
First round
6	(Chile) P Capdeville	6^{3}	2^{r}
Q	(Uruguay) M Felder	7^{7}	5
(Spain) J Martí	6	6
WC	(Argentina) Guillermo Durán	3	2
Q	(Montenegro) G Tošić	1	3
WC	(Argentina) A Collarini	6	6
(Argentina) F Argüello	4	5
4	(Brazil) R Dutra da Silva	6	7
5	(Argentina) M Alund	6	7
Q	(Argentina) J-M Aranguren	2	5
LL	(Dominican Republic) J Hernández	1	5
(Argentina) Diego Schwartzman	6	7
(Ecuador) JC Campozano	4	4
(Argentina) Leandro Migani	6	6
WC	(Chile) N Massú	3	1
2	(Argentina) H Zeballos	6	6

Second round
Q	(Uruguay) M Felder	3	0^{r}
(Spain) J Martí	6	4
WC	(Argentina) A Collarini	7	6
4	(Brazil) R Dutra da Silva	5	4
5	(Argentina) M Alund	6	6
(Argentina) D Schwartzman	4	2
(Argentina) L Migani	3	4
2	(Argentina) H Zeballos	6	6

Quarterfinals
(Spain) J Martí	4	7^{9}	6
WC	(Argentina) A Collarini	6	6^{7}	2
5	(Argentina) M Alund	5	3
2	(Argentina) H Zeballos	7	6

Semifinals
(Spain) J Martí	6	5	6
2	(Argentina) H Zeballos	3	7	4
