= 2014 Copa Gobierno de Córdoba – Doubles =

Doubles
- 2014 Copa Gobierno de Córdoba

Final
- Champions: (Brazil) Marcelo Demoliner (Chile) Nicolás Jarry
- Runners-up: (Bolivia) Hugo Dellien (Argentina) Juan Ignacio Londero
- Score: 6–3, 7–5

Events
Singles	Doubles
- Copa Gobierno de Córdoba

The 2014 Copa Gobierno de Córdoba doubles was a professional tennis competition. This was the first edition of the tournament.

Marcelo Demoliner and Nicolás Jarry won the title by defeating Hugo Dellien and Juan Ignacio Londero 6–3, 7–5 in the final.

== Seeds ==
1. (Argentina) Diego Schwartzman / (Argentina) Horacio Zeballos (withdrew)
2. (Argentina) Máximo González / (Argentina) Guido Pella (semifinals)
3. (Argentina) Guillermo Durán / (Argentina) Renzo Olivo (quarterfinals)
4. (Brazil) Marcelo Demoliner / (Chile) Nicolás Jarry (champions)

== Draw ==
Key

- Q = Qualifier
- WC = Wild card
- LL = Lucky loser
- Alt = Alternate
- ITF = ITF entry
- PR = Protected ranking
- SR = Special ranking
- SE = Special exempt
- JE = Junior exempt
- JR = Junior Accelerator Programme entrant
- CO = College Accelerator Programme entrant
- NG = Next Gen Accelerator Program entrant
- w/o = Walkover
- r = Retired
- d = Defaulted

=== Draw ===
First round
Alt	(Argentina) A Collarini (Argentina) M Trungelliti	4	3
(Argentina) G Andreozzi (Argentina) F Argüello	6	6
(Bolivia) H Dellien (Argentina) JI Londero	7^{11}	6
(Brazil) G Clezar (Chile) G Lama	6^{9}	1
3	(Argentina) G Durán (Argentina) R Olivo	6	6
(Uruguay) A Behar (Australia) J Kubler	3	2
(Bosnia and Herzegovina) T Brkić (Chile) H Podlipnik	3	6	[10]
(Spain) R Ramírez Hidalgo (Spain) J Samper-Montaña	6	3	[8]
WC	(Argentina) P Heras (Argentina) Mateo Nicolas Martinez	6	3	[6]
(Argentina) M Alund (Spain) F Bagnis	4	6	[10]
(Belgium) A De Greef (France) G Mina	4	4
4	(Brazil) M Demoliner (Chile) N Jarry	6	6
WC	(Argentina) JP Ficovich (Argentina) F Mena	2	6	[3]
WC	(Argentina) N Kicker (Argentina) JP Paz	6	1	[10]
(Peru) S Galdós (Argentina) A Molteni	6	2	[9]
2	(Argentina) M González (Argentina) G Pella	3	6	[11]

Quarterfinals
(Argentina) G Andreozzi (Argentina) F Argüello	5	6^{6}
(Bolivia) H Dellien (Argentina) JI Londero	7	7^{8}
3	(Argentina) G Durán (Argentina) R Olivo	6	5	[7]
(Bosnia and Herzegovina) T Brkić (Chile) H Podlipnik	3	7	[10]
(Argentina) M Alund (Spain) F Bagnis	3	7	[6]
4	(Brazil) M Demoliner (Chile) N Jarry	6	5	[10]
WC	(Argentina) N Kicker (Argentina) JP Paz
2	(Argentina) M González (Argentina) G Pella	w.o

Semifinals
(Bolivia) H Dellien (Argentina) JI Londero	6	6
(Bosnia and Herzegovina) T Brkić (Chile) H Podlipnik	4	4
4	(Brazil) M Demoliner (Chile) N Jarry	6	3	[10]
2	(Argentina) M González (Argentina) G Pella	3	6	[7]

Final
(Bolivia) H Dellien (Argentina) JI Londero	3	5
4	(Brazil) M Demoliner (Chile) N Jarry	6	7

== See also ==
- Association of Tennis Professionals
- History of tennis
