= 2012 SDA Tennis Open – Doubles =

Doubles
- 2012 SDA Tennis Open

Final
- Champions: (Brazil) André Ghem (Argentina) Marco Trungelliti
- Runners-up: (Argentina) Facundo Bagnis (Argentina) Pablo Galdón
- Score: 6–1, 6–2

Events
Singles	Doubles
← 2011 ·	SDA Tennis Open	· 2013 →

André Ghem and Marco Trungelliti won the title, defeating Facundo Bagnis and Pablo Galdón 6–1, 6–2 in the final.

== Seeds ==
1. (Moldova) Radu Albot / (France) Stéphane Robert (quarterfinals)
2. (Brazil) André Ghem / (Argentina) Marco Trungelliti (champions)
3. (Germany) Gero Kretschmer / (Germany) Alex Satschko (quarterfinals)
4. (Argentina) Máximo González / (Argentina) Diego Junqueira (quarterfinals)

== Draw ==
=== Key ===
- Q = Qualifier
- WC = Wild card
- LL = Lucky loser
- Alt = Alternate
- SE = Special exempt
- PR = Protected ranking
- ITF = ITF entry
- JE = Junior exempt
- w/o = Walkover
- r = Retired
- d = Defaulted
- SR = Special ranking

=== Draw ===
First round
1	(Moldova) R Albot (France) S Robert	6	6
(Kuwait) M Ghareeb (Kuwait) Ziad Sultan	0	3
(Sweden) Jesper Brunström (Sweden) M Eriksson	4	3
(Argentina) F Bagnis (Argentina) P Galdón	6	6
4	(Argentina) M González (Argentina) D Junqueira	6	6
WC	(Belgium) Pierre Malcorps (Belgium) Thibaut Mercier	1	2
WC	(Belgium) Sebastien Job (Belgium) Cyril Joly	2	4
(Netherlands) T Schoorel (New Zealand) A Sitak	6	6
(Romania) V Hănescu (Greece) Niko Karagiannis	2	1
(Spain) Jordi Marse-Vidri (Spain) C Poch-Gradin	6	6
(Netherlands) Romano Frantzen (Netherlands) W Koolhof	6	6^{4}	[4]
3	(Germany) G Kretschmer (Germany) A Satschko	2	7^{7}	[10]
WC	(Belgium) Gilles Elseneer (Belgium) C Rochus	6	6
(Slovakia) P Červenák (Netherlands) N van der Meer	4	4
(Belgium) G Gigounon (Belgium) Y Reuter	2	6^{5}
2	(Brazil) A Ghem (Argentina) M Trungelliti	6	7^{7}

Quarterfinals
1	(Moldova) R Albot (France) S Robert	3	3
(Argentina) F Bagnis (Argentina) P Galdón	6	6
4	(Argentina) M González (Argentina) D Junqueira	3	3
(Netherlands) T Schoorel (New Zealand) A Sitak	6	6
(Spain) Jordi Marse-Vidri (Spain) C Poch-Gradin	6	6
3	(Germany) G Kretschmer (Germany) A Satschko	4	2
WC	(Belgium) Gilles Elseneer (Belgium) C Rochus	4	4
2	(Brazil) A Ghem (Argentina) M Trungelliti	6	6

Semifinals
(Argentina) F Bagnis (Argentina) P Galdón	6	6
(Netherlands) T Schoorel (New Zealand) A Sitak	4	4
(Spain) Jordi Marse-Vidri (Spain) C Poch-Gradin	6^{5}	6^{1}
2	(Brazil) A Ghem (Argentina) M Trungelliti	7^{7}	7^{7}

Final
(Argentina) F Bagnis (Argentina) P Galdón	1	2
2	(Brazil) A Ghem (Argentina) M Trungelliti	6	6
