= 2016 Racket Club Open – Doubles =

Doubles
- 2016 Racket Club Open

Final
- Champions: (Argentina) Facundo Bagnis (Argentina) Máximo González
- Runners-up: (Peru) Sergio Galdós (Sweden) Christian Lindell
- Score: 6–1, 6–2

Events
Singles	Doubles
- Racket Club Open

Second seeds Facundo Bagnis and Máximo González won the title, beating Sergio Galdós and Christian Lindell 6–1, 6–2

== Seeds ==
1. (Chile) Julio Peralta / (Argentina) Horacio Zeballos (quarterfinals, withdrew)
2. (Argentina) Facundo Bagnis / (Argentina) Máximo González (champions)
3. (United States) Sekou Bangoura / (United States) Matt Seeberger (first round)
4. (Dominican Republic) José Hernández / (Argentina) Andrés Molteni (semifinals)

== Draw ==
Key

- Q = Qualifier
- WC = Wild card
- LL = Lucky loser
- Alt = Alternate
- ITF = ITF entry
- PR = Protected ranking
- SR = Special ranking
- SE = Special exempt
- JE = Junior exempt
- JR = Junior Accelerator Programme entrant
- CO = College Accelerator Programme entrant
- NG = Next Gen Accelerator Program entrant
- w/o = Walkover
- r = Retired
- d = Defaulted

=== Draw ===
First round
1	(Chile) J Peralta (Argentina) H Zeballos	6	7
WC	(Argentina) L Arnold Ker (Spain) R Ramírez Hidalgo	2	5
(Argentina) F Argüello (Argentina) P Cachin	5	7^{7}	[8]
(Peru) S Galdós (Sweden) C Lindell	7	6^{0}	[10]
4	(Dominican Republic) J Hernández (Argentina) A Molteni	6	7^{7}
(Slovakia) A Martin (Austria) G Melzer	2	6^{3}
(El Salvador) M Arévalo (Venezuela) L D Martínez	7	7^{7}
WC	(Argentina) JP Paz (Argentina) M Peña López	5	6^{3}
(France) J Eysseric (Mexico) M Á Reyes-Varela	3	4
(Argentina) G Andreozzi (Uruguay) A Behar	6	6
(Brazil) R Dutra Silva (Brazil) J Souza	6	5	[10]
3	(United States) S Bangoura (United States) M Seeberger	4	7	[7]
(Argentina) A Collarini (Argentina) N Kicker	4	4
(Brazil) G Clezar (Brazil) F Neis	6	6
WC	(Argentina) H Casanova (Argentina) F Coria	3	1
2	(Argentina) F Bagnis (Argentina) M González	6	6

Quarterfinals
1	(Chile) J Peralta (Argentina) H Zeballos
(Peru) S Galdós (Sweden) C Lindell	w/o
4	(Dominican Republic) J Hernández (Argentina) A Molteni	6	6
(El Salvador) M Arévalo (Venezuela) L D Martínez	3	3
(Argentina) G Andreozzi (Uruguay) A Behar	w/o
(Brazil) R Dutra Silva (Brazil) J Souza
(Brazil) G Clezar (Brazil) F Neis	5	6	[1]
2	(Argentina) F Bagnis (Argentina) M González	7	1	[10]

Semifinals
(Peru) S Galdós (Sweden) C Lindell	6	6
4	(Dominican Republic) J Hernández (Argentina) A Molteni	4	4
(Argentina) G Andreozzi (Uruguay) A Behar	2	3
2	(Argentina) F Bagnis (Argentina) M González	6	6

Final
(Peru) S Galdós (Sweden) C Lindell	1	2
2	(Argentina) F Bagnis (Argentina) M González	6	6
