= 2016 Racket Club Open – Singles =

Singles
- 2016 Racket Club Open

Final
- Champion: (Argentina) Facundo Bagnis
- Runner-up: (Belgium) Arthur De Greef
- Score: 6–3, 6–2

Events
Singles	Doubles
- Racket Club Open

Facundo Bagnis won his sixth career ATP Challenger Tour title, beating Arthur De Greef 6–3, 6–2

== Seeds ==
1. (Argentina) Horacio Zeballos (withdrew)
2. (Brazil) Rogério Dutra Silva (semifinals)
3. (Spain) Roberto Carballés Baena (second round)
4. (Argentina) Facundo Argüello (second round)
5. (Argentina) Facundo Bagnis (champion)
6. (Brazil) João Souza (second round)
7. (Slovakia) Andrej Martin (first round)
8. (Argentina) Máximo González (quarterfinals)

== Draw ==
Key

- Q = Qualifier
- WC = Wild card
- LL = Lucky loser
- Alt = Alternate
- ITF = ITF entry
- PR = Protected ranking
- SR = Special ranking
- SE = Special exempt
- JE = Junior exempt
- JR = Junior Accelerator Programme entrant
- CO = College Accelerator Programme entrant
- NG = Next Gen Accelerator Program entrant
- w/o = Walkover
- r = Retired
- d = Defaulted

=== Finals ===
Semifinals
(Argentina) Nicolás Kicker	6^{4}	3
(Belgium) Arthur De Greef	7^{7}	6
5	(Argentina) Facundo Bagnis	3	6	6
2	(Brazil) Rogério Dutra Silva	6	2	2

Final
(Belgium) Arthur De Greef	3	2
5	(Argentina) Facundo Bagnis	6	6

=== Top half ===
First round
LL	(Germany) P Torebko	6	6
Q	(Argentina) Maximiliano Estévez	4	4
(Argentina) N Kicker	3	6	6
LL	(Argentina) H Casanova	6	3	2
(France) M Hamou	6	6
WC	(France) G Mina	2	2
(Brazil) G Clezar	3	4
6	(Brazil) J Souza	6	6
3	(Spain) R Carballés Baena	7^{7}	6
(El Salvador) M Arévalo	6^{5}	1
(Sweden) C Lindell	2	3
(Belgium) A De Greef	6	6
(France) A Michon	6	6
(Spain) R Ramírez Hidalgo	3	4
(France) J Eysseric	4	3
8	(Argentina) M González	6	6

Second round
LL	(Germany) P Torebko	2	3
(Argentina) N Kicker	6	6
(France) M Hamou	6^{4}	6	6
6	(Brazil) J Souza	7^{7}	4	2
3	(Spain) R Carballés Baena	6	3	5
(Belgium) A De Greef	1	6	7
(France) A Michon	2	4
8	(Argentina) M González	6	6

Quarterfinals
(Argentina) N Kicker	6	6
(France) M Hamou	4	2
(Belgium) A De Greef	6	7
8	(Argentina) M González	3	5

Semifinals
(Argentina) N Kicker	6^{4}	3
(Belgium) A De Greef	7^{7}	6

=== Bottom half ===
First round
5	(Argentina) F Bagnis	6	6
WC	(Argentina) A Molteni	0	3
(Dominican Republic) J Hernández	7	6
Q	(Uruguay) M Cuevas	5	4
(Argentina) G Andreozzi	6	5	6
Q	(Argentina) A Velotti	2	7	1
Q	(Argentina) F Agamenone	3	0
4	(Argentina) F Argüello	6	6
7	(Slovakia) A Martin	1	2
(United States) S Bangoura	6	6
(Argentina) P Cachin	6^{6}	6	2
(Austria) G Melzer	7^{8}	2	6
(Argentina) T Lipovšek Puches	6	6
WC	(Argentina) S Rodríguez Taverna	2	3
WC	(Argentina) Matias Zukas	1	2
2	(Brazil) R Dutra Silva	6	6

Second round
5	(Argentina) F Bagnis	6	6
(Dominican Republic) J Hernández	3	2
(Argentina) G Andreozzi	7	6
4	(Argentina) F Argüello	5	2
(United States) S Bangoura	4	2
(Austria) G Melzer	6	6
(Argentina) T Lipovšek Puches	6	1	2
2	(Brazil) R Dutra Silva	4	6	6

Quarterfinals
5	(Argentina) F Bagnis	6	3	7
(Argentina) G Andreozzi	3	6	5
(Austria) G Melzer	1	7^{7}	2
2	(Brazil) R Dutra Silva	6	6^{3}	6

Semifinals
5	(Argentina) F Bagnis	3	6	6
2	(Brazil) R Dutra Silva	6	2	2
