= 2012 Copa Agco Cordoba =

- Date: 15–21 October
- Edition: 1st
- Surface: Clay
- Location: Villa Allende, Argentina

Champions

Singles
- (France) Guillaume Rufin

Doubles
- (Argentina) Facundo Bagnis / (Argentina) Diego Junqueira
Copa Agco Cordoba	· 2013 →

The 2012 Copa Agco Cordoba was a professional tennis tournament played on clay courts. It was the first edition of the tournament which was part of the 2012 ATP Challenger Tour. It took place in Villa Allende, Argentina between 15 and 21 October 2012.

== Singles main draw entrants ==
=== Seeds ===
Country	Player	Rank^{1}	Seed
ARG	Leonardo Mayer	81	1
ARG	Horacio Zeballos	123	2
FRA	Guillaume Rufin	124	3
BRA	Rogério Dutra da Silva	129	4
ARG	Martín Alund	130	5
CHI	Paul Capdeville	164	6
ARG	Facundo Bagnis	180	7
ARG	Guido Andreozzi	182	8

- ^{1} Rankings are as of October 8, 2012.

=== Other entrants ===
The following players received wildcards into the singles main draw:

- (United States) Andrea Collarini
- (Argentina) Guillermo Durán
- (Argentina) Juan Ignacio Londero
- (Chile) Nicolás Massú

The following players received entry from the qualifying draw:

- (Argentina) Juan-Martín Aranguren
- (Uruguay) Marcel Felder
- (Montenegro) Goran Tošić
- (Netherlands) Antal van der Duim

== Champions ==
=== Singles ===
- (France) Guillaume Rufin def. (Spain) Javier Martí, 6–2, 6–3

=== Doubles ===
- (Argentina) Facundo Bagnis / (Argentina) Diego Junqueira def. (Uruguay) Ariel Behar / (Argentina) Guillermo Durán, 6–1, 6–2
