= 2014 Savannah Challenger =

- Date: 21 – 27 April
- Edition: 6th
- Draw: 32S / 16D
- Prize money: $50,000
- Surface: Green clay
- Location: Savannah, Georgia, United States

Champions

Singles
- (Australia) Nick Kyrgios

Doubles
- (Serbia) Ilija Bozoljac / (New Zealand) Michael Venus
- Savannah Challenger

The 2014 Savannah Challenger was a professional tennis tournament played on clay courts. It was the fifth edition of the tournament which was part of the 2014 ATP Challenger Tour. It took place in Savannah, Georgia, United States between April 21 and April 27, 2014.

== Singles main-draw entrants ==
=== Seeds ===
Country	Player	Rank	Seed
USA	Donald Young	81	1
USA	Jack Sock	88	2
USA	Tim Smyczek	106	3
RUS	Alex Bogomolov Jr.	116	4
USA	Alex Kuznetsov	123	5
CAN	Peter Polansky	137	6
CAN	Frank Dancevic	140	7
AUT	Gerald Melzer	150	8

=== Other entrants ===
The following players received wildcards into the singles main draw:

- (United States) Evan King
- (United States) Jeff Dadamo
- (United States) Noah Rubin
- (United States) Robby Ginepri

The following player received entry as a special exempt into the singles main draw:

- (United States) Daniel Kosakowski

The following players received entry from the qualifying draw:

- (Japan) Yoshihito Nishioka
- (Australia) Thanasi Kokkinakis
- (United States) Bjorn Fratangelo
- (United States) Jean-Yves Aubone

== Doubles main-draw entrants ==
=== Seeds ===
Country	Player	Country	Player	Rank	Seed
CRO	Marin Draganja	FIN	Henri Kontinen	124	1
USA	Nicholas Monroe	USA	Jack Sock	168	2
GER	Philipp Marx	SVK	Michal Mertiňák	178	3
AUS	Rameez Junaid	CAN	Adil Shamasdin	203	4

=== Other entrants ===
The following pairs received wildcards into the doubles main draw:

- (United States) Evan King / (United States) Devin McCarthy
- (United States) Collin Altamirano / (United States) Stefan Kozlov
- (United States) Robby Ginepri / (United States) Alex Kuznetsov

The following pairs received entry from the qualifying draw:

- (United Kingdom) David Rice / (United Kingdom) Sean Thornley

== Champions ==
=== Singles ===
- (Australia) Nick Kyrgios def. (United States) Jack Sock, 2–6, 7–6^{(7–4)}, 6–4

=== Doubles ===
- (Serbia) Ilija Bozoljac / (New Zealand) Michael Venus def. (Argentina) Facundo Bagnis / (Russia) Alex Bogomolov Jr., 7–5, 6–2
