= List of protected heritage sites in Grez-Doiceau =

This table shows an overview of the protected heritage sites in the Walloon town Graven, or Grez-Doiceau. This list is part of Belgium's national heritage.

Object	Year/architect	Town/section	Address	Coordinates	Number^{?}	Image
Domain of Savenel ^{(nl)} ^{(fr)}		Graven	Nethen	50.788240°N 4.671997°E	25037-CLT-0001-01 Info	Domein van Savenel
Organs of the church of Notre-Dame de Bossut ^{(nl)} ^{(fr)}		Graven	Bossut-Gottechain	50.761729°N 4.694622°E	25037-CLT-0002-01 Info	
Church of Notre-Dame de l'Assomption and enseble of the church and its surroundings ^{(nl)} ^{(fr)}		Graven	Bossut-Gottechain	50.761704°N 4.694676°E	25037-CLT-0005-01 Info	
Ensemble of the castle of Florival and its surrounding area ^{(nl)} ^{(fr)}		Graven	Grez-Doiceau	50.760171°N 4.652149°E	25037-CLT-0006-01 Info	
Totality of the church of Saint-Georges, with the organs that are considered part of the building ^{(nl)} ^{(fr)}		Graven		50.738023°N 4.696610°E	25037-CLT-0007-01 Info	Totaliteit van de kerk Saint-Georges, met de orgels die als gebouwonderdeel worden beschouwd More images
Ensemble of the churchyard of the church of Saint-Georges and the public square ^{(nl)} ^{(fr)}		Graven	Grez-Doiceau	50.738550°N 4.695464°E	25037-CLT-0008-01 Info	
Totality of the facades and roofs of the rectory of the parish of Saint-Georges ^{(nl)} ^{(fr)}		Graven	Grez-Doiceau	50.738368°N 4.696312°E	25037-CLT-0009-01 Info	
The four main buildings that constitute the ensemble of the mill Chapelle, the machinery, the wheel, the walls and cobbled courtyard and the ensemble of these buildings and their surroundings ^{(nl)} ^{(fr)}		Graven	Biez	50.731868°N 4.731763°E	25037-CLT-0010-01 Info	
Marais de Laurensart ^{(nl)} ^{(fr)}		Graven		50.730684°N 4.635188°E	25037-CLT-0012-01 Info	
Medieval motte of Nethen and a protection zone ^{(nl)} ^{(fr)}		Graven		50.784345°N 4.675298°E	25037-CLT-0013-01 Info	
Old motte castle ^{(nl)} ^{(fr)}		Graven	Grez-Doiceau	50.746094°N 4.660389°E	25037-CLT-0014-01 Info	
Organ of the church of Saint-Pierre ^{(nl)} ^{(fr)}		Graven	rue du Mont n°1 à Archennes	50.751263°N 4.671348°E	25037-CLT-0015-01 Info	Orgel van de kerk Saint-Pierre More images
Organ of the church of Saint-Antoine ^{(nl)} ^{(fr)}		Graven	rue Constant Wauters n°16a, Pécrot	50.771606°N 4.650896°E	25037-CLT-0016-01 Info	
A part of the Meerdael forest in French territory ^{(nl)} ^{(fr)}		Graven		50.793646°N 4.681099°E	25037-CLT-0017-01 Info	
The buffet and the organ of the church of Notre-Dame de l'Assomption ^{(nl)} ^{(fr)}		Graven		50.761704°N 4.694676°E	25037-PEX-0001-01 Info	

== See also ==
- Lists of protected heritage sites in Walloon Brabant
- Grez-Doiceau
