= 2014 Savannah Challenger – Singles =

Singles
- 2014 Savannah Challenger

Final
- Champions: (Australia) Nick Kyrgios
- Runners-up: (United States) Jack Sock
- Score: 2–6, 7–6^{(7–4)}, 6–4

Events
Singles	Doubles
- Savannah Challenger

Ryan Harrison was the defending champion, but did not participate.

Nick Kyrgios won the title, defeating Jack Sock 2–6, 7–6^{(7–4)}, 6–4 in the final.

== Seeds ==
1. (United States) Donald Young (first round)
2. (United States) Jack Sock (final)
3. (United States) Tim Smyczek (first round)
4. (Russia) Alex Bogomolov Jr. (quarterfinals)
5. (United States) Alex Kuznetsov (quarterfinals)
6. (Canada) Peter Polansky (second round)
7. (Canada) Frank Dancevic (quarterfinals)
8. (Austria) Gerald Melzer (second round)

== Draw ==
Key

- Q = Qualifier
- WC = Wild card
- LL = Lucky loser
- Alt = Alternate
- ITF = ITF entry
- PR = Protected ranking
- SR = Special ranking
- SE = Special exempt
- JE = Junior exempt
- JR = Junior Accelerator Programme entrant
- CO = College Accelerator Programme entrant
- NG = Next Gen Accelerator Program entrant
- w/o = Walkover
- r = Retired
- d = Defaulted

=== Finals ===
Semifinals
(Australia) Nick Kyrgios	6	6
(Argentina) Facundo Bagnis	3	4
(Serbia) Filip Krajinović	6	4	4
2	(United States) Jack Sock	3	6	6

Final
(Australia) Nick Kyrgios	2	7^{7}	6
2	(United States) Jack Sock	6	6^{4}	4

=== Top half ===
First round
1	(United States) D Young	3	6	1
Q	(Japan) Y Nishioka	6	3	6
(Australia) N Kyrgios	6	6
Q	(Australia) T Kokkinakis	1	3
(Serbia) I Bozoljac	6	3	4
WC	(United States) E King	3	6	6
WC	(United States) J Dadamo	6	5	1
5	(United States) A Kuznetsov	3	7	6
3	(United States) T Smyczek	6^{5}	3
(Argentina) F Bagnis	7^{7}	6
(Croatia) A Veić	3	6	4
(United States) B Reynolds	6	3	6
(Australia) J Kubler	4	6	6
Alt	(Zimbabwe) T Garanganga	6	2	1
WC	(United States) N Rubin	1	6^{2}
7	(Canada) F Dancevic	6	7^{7}

Second round
Q	(Japan) Y Nishioka	3	3
(Australia) N Kyrgios	6	6
WC	(United States) E King	1	3
5	(United States) A Kuznetsov	6	6
(Argentina) F Bagnis	6	6
(United States) B Reynolds	4	3
(Australia) J Kubler	7^{7}	6^{5}	1
7	(Canada) F Dancevic	6^{5}	7^{7}	6

Quarterfinals
(Australia) N Kyrgios	6	6
5	(United States) A Kuznetsov	3	2
(Argentina) F Bagnis	6^{7}	6	6
7	(Canada) F Dancevic	7^{9}	1	3

Semifinals
(Australia) N Kyrgios	6	6
(Argentina) F Bagnis	3	4

=== Bottom half ===
First round
8	(Austria) G Melzer	7^{7}	6^{5}	6
Q	(United States) B Fratangelo	6^{4}	7^{7}	3
(Serbia) F Krajinović	6	6
(Republic of Ireland) J McGee	3	4
(United States) J Jenkins	3	0
SE	(United States) D Kosakowski	6	6
(United Kingdom) D Rice	2	2
4	(Russia) A Bogomolov Jr.	6	6
6	(Canada) P Polansky	6	1	6
WC	(United States) R Ginepri	1	6	4
(Ukraine) I Marchenko	6	6
(United States) R Williams	3	4
(United Kingdom) J Ward	6^{4}	6	6
Q	(United States) Jean-Yves Aubone	7^{7}	2	4
(Uzbekistan) F Dustov	6	5	3
2	(United States) J Sock	4	7	6

Second round
8	(Austria) G Melzer	3	3
(Serbia) F Krajinović	6	6
SE	(United States) D Kosakowski	3	3
4	(Russia) A Bogomolov Jr.	6	6
6	(Canada) P Polansky	6	4	5
(Ukraine) I Marchenko	4	6	7
(United Kingdom) J Ward	5	1
2	(United States) J Sock	7	6

Quarterfinals
(Serbia) F Krajinović	6	6
4	(Russia) A Bogomolov Jr.	3	4
(Ukraine) I Marchenko	3	4
2	(United States) J Sock	6	6

Semifinals
(Serbia) F Krajinović	6	4	4
2	(United States) J Sock	3	6	6
