= 2016 Vivo Tennis Cup =

- Date: 18–24 January
- Edition: 1st
- Surface: Clay
- Location: Rio de Janeiro, Brazil

Champions

Singles
- (Argentina) Facundo Bagnis

Doubles
- (Portugal) Gastão Elias / (Brazil) André Ghem
- Vivo Tennis Cup

The 2016 Vivo Tennis Cup was a professional tennis tournament played on clay courts. It was the first edition of the tournament which was part of the 2016 ATP Challenger Tour. It took place in Rio de Janeiro, Brazil between 18 and 24 January 2016.

== Singles main-draw entrants ==
=== Seeds ===
Country	Player	Rank^{1}	Seed
ARG	~~Horacio Zeballos~~	~~124~~	~~1~~
ESP	Roberto Carballés Baena	125	2
BRA	Rogério Dutra Silva	126	3
ARG	Facundo Bagnis	130	4
POR	Gastão Elias	135	5
ARG	Facundo Argüello	138	6
AUT	Gerald Melzer	144	7
SVK	Andrej Martin	146	8

- ^{1} Rankings are as of January 11, 2016.

=== Other entrants ===
The following players received wildcards into the singles main draw:

- (Brazil) Wilson Leite
- (Brazil) Thiago Monteiro
- (Brazil) Pedro Sakamoto
- (Brazil) Carlos Eduardo Severino

The following player received entry to the main draw as an alternate:

- (France) Axel Michon

The following players received entry from the qualifying draw:

- (Argentina) Andrea Collarini
- (Ecuador) Gonzalo Escobar
- (Germany) Peter Torebko
- (Belgium) Clement Geens

The following player received entry as a lucky loser:

- (Brazil) Fabrício Neis

== Champions ==
=== Singles ===
- (Argentina) Facundo Bagnis def. (Brazil) Guilherme Clezar 6–4, 4–6, 6–2

=== Doubles ===
- (Portugal) Gastão Elias / (Brazil) André Ghem def. (France) Jonathan Eysseric / (Mexico) Miguel Ángel Reyes-Varela 6–4, 7–6^{(7–2)}
