= 2012 Copa Agco Cordoba – Doubles =

Doubles
- 2012 Copa Agco Cordoba

Final
- Champions: (Argentina) Facundo Bagnis; (Argentina) Diego Junqueira
- Runners-up: (Uruguay) Ariel Behar (Argentina) Guillermo Durán
- Score: 6–1, 6–2

Events
Singles	Doubles
← 2011 ·	Copa Agco Cordoba	· 2013 →

Facundo Bagnis and Diego Junqueira won the final 6–1, 6–2 against Ariel Behar and Guillermo Durán.

== Seeds ==
1. (Argentina) Martín Alund / (Argentina) Horacio Zeballos (first round)
2. (Argentina) Guido Andreozzi / (Uruguay) Marcel Felder (semifinals)
3. (Montenegro) Goran Tošić / (United States) Denis Zivkovic (first round)
4. (Chile) Paul Capdeville / (Spain) Iván Navarro (first round, withdrew)

== Draw ==
=== Key ===
- Q = Qualifier
- WC = Wild card
- LL = Lucky loser
- Alt = Alternate
- SE = Special exempt
- PR = Protected ranking
- ITF = ITF entry
- JE = Junior exempt
- w/o = Walkover
- r = Retired
- d = Defaulted
- SR = Special ranking

=== Draw ===
First round

Quarterfinals

Semifinals

Final

1
- (Argentina) M Alund
- (Argentina) H Zeballos
2
7
[10]

(Uruguay) A Behar
(Argentina) Guillermo Durán
6
5
[12]

(Uruguay) A Behar
(Argentina) G Durán
6
1
[11]

- (Argentina) S Decoud
- (France) S Robert
6
6

- (Argentina) S Decoud
- (France) S Robert
2
6
[9]

(Argentina) Juan Ignacio Londero
(Argentina) Leandro Migani
2
4

(Uruguay) A Behar
(Argentina) G Durán
7
6

4
- (Chile) P Capdeville
- (Spain) I Navarro

- (Netherlands) A van der Duim
- (Netherlands) B Westerhof
5
1

- (Ecuador) JC Campozano
- (Argentina) A Molteni
w/o

- (Ecuador) JC Campozano
- (Argentina) A Molteni
6
2
[5]

- (Argentina) F Argüello
- (Spain) J Martí
6^{8}
5

- (Netherlands) A van der Duim
- (Netherlands) B Westerhof
4
6
[10]

- (Netherlands) A van der Duim
- (Netherlands) B Westerhof
7^{10}
7

(Uruguay) A Behar
(Argentina) G Durán
1
2

- (Argentina) Diego Schwartzmann
- (Argentina) A Velotti
2
6
[6]

- (Argentina) F Bagnis
- (Argentina) D Junqueira
6
6

WC
- (Argentina) J-M Aranguren
- (Argentina) T Lipovšek Puches
6
2
[10]

WC
- (Argentina) J-M Aranguren
- (Argentina) T Lipovšek Puches
3
4

- (Argentina) F Bagnis
- (Argentina) D Junqueira
6
6

- (Argentina) F Bagnis
- (Argentina) D Junqueira
6
6

3
- (Montenegro) G Tošić
- (United States) D Zivkovic
3
3

- (Argentina) F Bagnis
- (Argentina) D Junqueira
4
6
[10]

- (United States) A Collarini
- (Argentina) R Olivo
5
6
[10]

2
- (Argentina) G Andreozzi
- (Uruguay) M Felder
6
4
[8]

WC
- (Argentina) Franco Emanuel Egea
- (Dominican Republic) J Hernández
7
4
[6]

- (United States) A Collarini
- (Argentina) R Olivo
7^{7}
2
[7]

WC
(Argentina) L Mayer
(Argentina) Martin Rios-Benitez
2
4

2
- (Argentina) G Andreozzi
- (Uruguay) M Felder
6^{4}
6
[10]

2
- (Argentina) G Andreozzi
- (Uruguay) M Felder
6
6
