= 2014 Savannah Challenger – Doubles =

Doubles
- 2014 Savannah Challenger

Final
- Champions: (Serbia) Ilija Bozoljac (New Zealand) Michael Venus
- Runners-up: (Argentina) Facundo Bagnis (Russia) Alex Bogomolov Jr.
- Score: 7–5, 6–2

Events
Singles	Doubles
- Savannah Challenger

Teymuraz Gabashvili and Denys Molchanov were the defending champions, but did not participate.

Ilija Bozoljac and Michael Venus won the title, defeating Facundo Bagnis and Alex Bogomolov Jr. 7–5, 6–2 in the final.

== Seeds ==
1. (Croatia) Marin Draganja / (Finland) Henri Kontinen (semifinals)
2. (United States) Nicholas Monroe / (United States) Jack Sock (first round)
3. (Germany) Philipp Marx / (Slovakia) Michal Mertiňák (quarterfinals)
4. (Australia) Rameez Junaid / (Canada) Adil Shamasdin (semifinals)

== Draw ==
Key

- Q = Qualifier
- WC = Wild card
- LL = Lucky loser
- Alt = Alternate
- ITF = ITF entry
- PR = Protected ranking
- SR = Special ranking
- SE = Special exempt
- JE = Junior exempt
- JR = Junior Accelerator Programme entrant
- CO = College Accelerator Programme entrant
- NG = Next Gen Accelerator Program entrant
- w/o = Walkover
- r = Retired
- d = Defaulted

=== Draw ===
First round
1	(Croatia) M Draganja (Finland) H Kontinen	2	6	[10]
WC	(United States) E King (United States) Devin McCarthy	6	4	[6]
Q	(United Kingdom) D Rice (United Kingdom) S Thornley	6	5	[8]
(United States) J Jenkins (United States) D Young	4	7	[10]
3	(Germany) P Marx (Slovakia) M Mertiňák	6	6
WC	(United States) C Altamirano (United States) S Kozlov	3	3
(Argentina) F Bagnis (Russia) A Bogomolov Jr.	7^{7}	6
(Australia) J Kerr (Austria) G Melzer	6^{2}	4
(Canada) F Dancevic (Canada) P Polansky	4	2
(United States) T Smyczek (United States) R Williams	6	6
WC	(United States) R Ginepri (United States) A Kuznetsov	5	3
4	(Australia) R Junaid (Canada) A Shamasdin	7	6
(Serbia) I Bozoljac (New Zealand) M Venus	6	7^{7}
(United States) J Cerretani (Sweden) A Siljeström	4	6^{4}
(Croatia) F Škugor (United Kingdom) J Ward	2	1
2	(United States) N Monroe (United States) J Sock	6	6

Quarterfinals
1	(Croatia) M Draganja (Finland) H Kontinen	6	6
(United States) J Jenkins (United States) D Young	0	3
3	(Germany) P Marx (Slovakia) M Mertiňák	3	5
(Argentina) F Bagnis (Russia) A Bogomolov Jr.	6	7
(United States) T Smyczek (United States) R Williams	3	4
4	(Australia) R Junaid (Canada) A Shamasdin	6	6
(Serbia) I Bozoljac (New Zealand) M Venus	6	6
2	(United States) N Monroe (United States) J Sock	4	4

Semifinals
1	(Croatia) M Draganja (Finland) H Kontinen	5	6^{11}
(Argentina) F Bagnis (Russia) A Bogomolov Jr.	7	7^{13}
4	(Australia) R Junaid (Canada) A Shamasdin	6^{8}	7	[6]
(Serbia) I Bozoljac (New Zealand) M Venus	7^{10}	5	[10]

Final
(Argentina) F Bagnis (Russia) A Bogomolov Jr.	5	2
(Serbia) I Bozoljac (New Zealand) M Venus	7	6
