= 2014 Copa Gobierno de Córdoba =

- Date: 20 – 26 October
- Edition: 1st
- Surface: Clay
- Location: Córdoba, Argentina

Champions

Singles
- (Colombia) Alejandro González

Doubles
- (Brazil) Marcelo Demoliner / (Chile) Nicolás Jarry
- Copa Gobierno de Córdoba

The 2014 Copa Gobierno de Córdoba was a professional tennis tournament played on clay courts. It was the only edition of the tournament which was part of the 2014 ATP Challenger Tour. It took place in Córdoba, Argentina between 20 and 26 October 2014. A Challenger event was reestablished in Córdoba in 2025 as the Challenger Córdoba.

== Singles main-draw entrants ==
=== Seeds ===
Country	Player	Rank^{1}	Seed
ARG	Diego Sebastián Schwartzman	89	1
COL	Alejandro González	97	2
ARG	Horacio Zeballos	99	3
BRA	João Souza	104	4
ARG	Máximo González	113	5
ARG	Facundo Bagnis	119	6
ARG	Facundo Argüello	140	7
AUS	Jason Kubler	152	8

- ^{1} Rankings are as of October 13, 2014.

=== Other entrants ===
The following players received wildcards into the singles main draw:

- (Argentina) Tomás Lipovšek Puches
- (Argentina) Federico Coria
- (Argentina) Renzo Olivo
- (Argentina) Pedro Cachin

The following players received entry from the qualifying draw:

- (Dominican Republic) José Hernández
- (Bolivia) Hugo Dellien
- (Argentina) Marco Trungelliti
- (Uruguay) Martín Cuevas

== Champions ==
=== Singles ===
- (Colombia) Alejandro González def. (Argentina) Máximo González, 7–5, 1–6, 6–3

=== Doubles ===
- (Brazil) Marcelo Demoliner / (Chile) Nicolás Jarry def. (Bolivia) Hugo Dellien / (Argentina) Juan Ignacio Londero, 6–3, 7–5
