= Copa Agco Cordoba =

- 2014 Copa Gobierno de Córdoba

Defunct tennis tournament
- Location: Córdoba, Argentina
- Category: ATP Challenger Tour
- Surface: Clay
- Draw: 32S/16Q/16D
- Prize money: US$50,000
- Website: Website

The Copa Agco Cordoba was a tennis tournament held in Córdoba, Argentina since 2012 until 2014. The event was part of the ATP Challenger Tour and was played on clay courts.

== Past finals ==
=== Singles ===
Year	Champion	Runner-up	Score
2014	(Colombia) Alejandro González	(Argentina) Máximo González	7–5, 1–6, 6–3
2013	Not played		
2012	(France) Guillaume Rufin	(Spain) Javier Martí	6–2, 6–3

=== Doubles ===
Year	Champions	Runners-up	Score
2014	(Brazil) Marcelo Demoliner (Chile) Nicolás Jarry	(Argentina) Juan Ignacio Londero (Bolivia) Hugo Dellien	6–3, 7–5
2013	Not played		
2012	(Argentina) Facundo Bagnis (Argentina) Diego Junqueira	(Uruguay) Ariel Behar (Argentina) Guillermo Durán	6–1, 6–2
