= Vivo Tennis Cup =

- 2016 Vivo Tennis Cup

Defunct tennis tournament
- Location: Rio de Janeiro, Brazil
- Venue: Clube Marapendi
- Category: ATP Challenger Tour
- Surface: Clay / Outdoors
- Draw: 32S/32Q/16D
- Prize money: $50,000
- Website: Official website

The Vivo Tennis Cup was a tennis tournament held in Rio de Janeiro, Brazil in 2016. The event was part of the ATP Challenger Tour and was played on outdoor clay courts.

== Past finals ==
=== Singles ===
Year	Champion	Runner-up	Score
2016	(Argentina) Facundo Bagnis	(Brazil) Guilherme Clezar	6–4, 4–6, 6–2

=== Doubles ===
Year	Champions	Runners-up	Score
2016	(Portugal) Gastão Elias (Brazil) André Ghem	(France) Jonathan Eysseric (Mexico) Miguel Ángel Reyes-Varela	6–4, 7–6^{(7–2)}
