= SDA Tennis Open =

Defunct tennis tournament
- Founded: 2012
- Abolished: 2012
- Editions: 1
- Location: Bercuit, Grez-Doiceau, Belgium
- Venue: Tennis Club du Bercuit
- Category: ATP Challenger Tour
- Surface: Clay
- Draw: 32S/21Q/16D
- Prize money: $42,500
- Website: Website

The SDA Tennis Open was a tennis tournament held in Bercuit, Belgium in 2012. The event was part of the ATP Challenger Tour and was played on clay courts. Former professional player Christophe Rochus was the director of the event.

== Past finals ==
=== Singles ===
Year	Champions	Runners-up	Score
2012	(Netherlands) Thiemo de Bakker	(Romania) Victor Hănescu	6–4, 3–6, 7–5

=== Doubles ===
Year	Champions	Runners-up	Score
2012	(Brazil) André Ghem (Argentina) Marco Trungelliti	(Argentina) Facundo Bagnis (Argentina) Pablo Galdón	6–1, 6–2
