= Racket Club Open =

- 2016 Racket Club Open

Defunct tennis tournament
- Location: Buenos Aires, Argentina
- Venue: Racket Club, Av. Valentin Alsina 1450, 1428 CABA, Argentina
- Category: ATP Challenger Tour
- Surface: Clay / Outdoors
- Draw: 32S/32Q/16D
- Prize money: $50,000+H

The Racket Club Open was a tennis tournament held in Buenos Aires, Argentina since 2016. The event is part of the ATP Challenger Tour and is played on outdoor clay courts.

== Past finals ==
=== Singles ===
Year	Champion	Runner-up	Score	Ref.
2016	(Argentina) Facundo Bagnis	(Belgium) Arthur De Greef	6–3, 6–2	

=== Doubles ===
Year	Champions	Runners-up	Score	Ref.
2016	(Argentina) Facundo Bagnis (Argentina) Máximo González	(Peru) Sergio Galdós (Sweden) Christian Lindell	6–1, 6–2	
