= Grez-Doiceau =

Municipality in Walloon Brabant province, Wallonia, Belgium

- Municipality
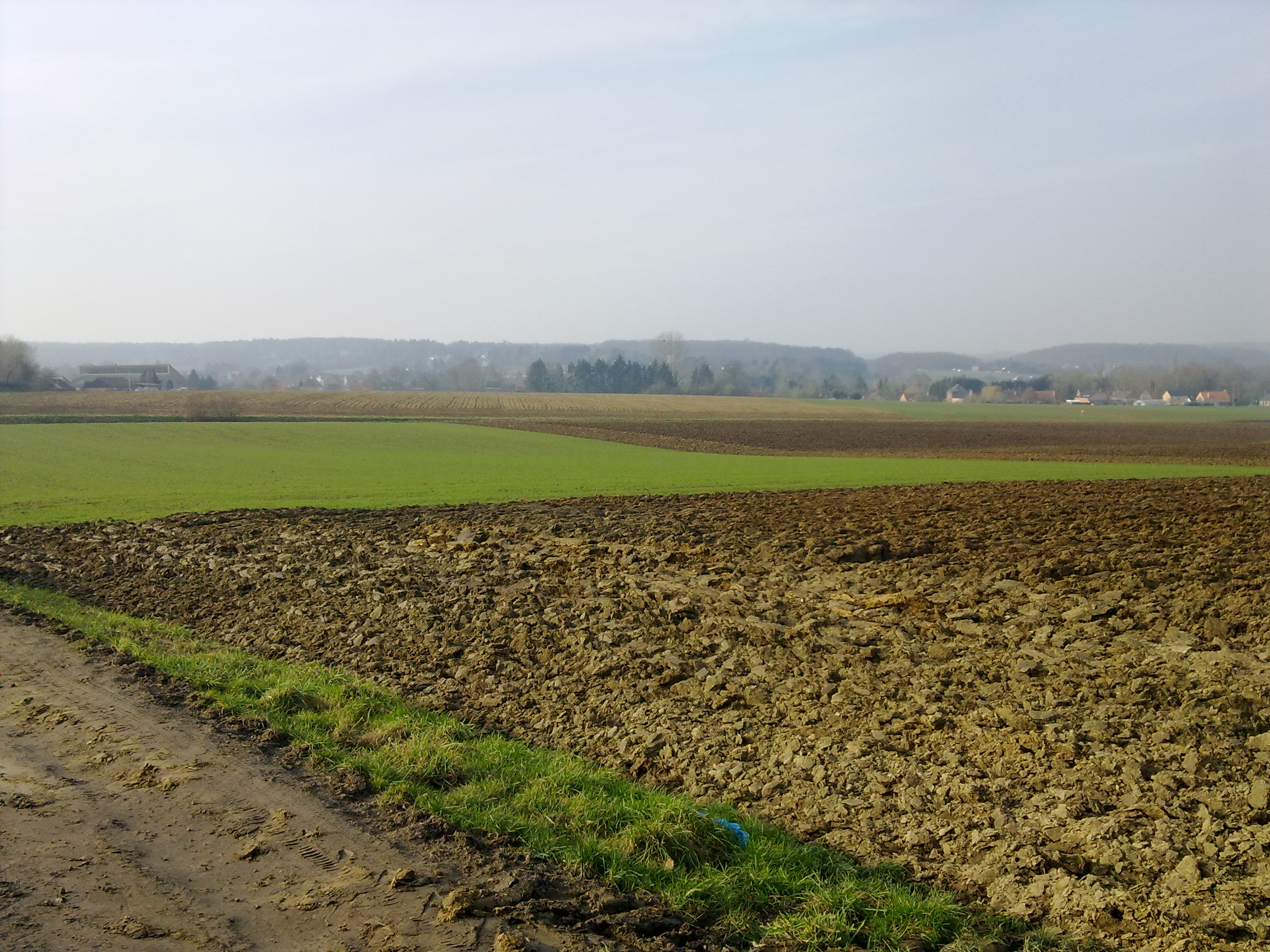

- Flag Coat of arms

- The municipality of Grez-Doiceau in Walloon Brabant
- Interactive map of Grez-Doiceau
- Location in Belgium
- Coordinates: 50°44′N 04°42′E
- Country: Belgium
- Community: French Community
- Region: Wallonia
- Province: Walloon Brabant
- Arrondissement: Nivelles

Government
  - Mayor: Paul Vandeleene
  - Governing parties: Ecolo; Avec Vous; DéFi Citoyens

Area
  - Total: 55.55 km^{2} (21.45 sq mi)

Population (2018-01-01)
  - Total: 13,368
  - Density: 240.6/km^{2} (623.3/sq mi)
- Postal codes: 1390
- NIS code: 25037
- Area codes: 010
- Website: www.grez-doiceau.be

Grez-Doiceau (French: [ɡʁe dwaso]; Walloon: Gré; Dutch: Graven [ˈɣraːvə(n)]) is a municipality of Wallonia located in the Belgian province of Walloon Brabant. On January 1, 2006, Grez-Doiceau had a total population of 12,403. The total area is 55.44 square kilometres (21.41 sq mi) which gives a population density of 224 inhabitants per km^{2}. Grez-Doiceau is watered by the Train, a tributary of the Dyle.

The municipality consists of the following districts: Archennes, Biez, Bossut-Gottechain, Grez-Doiceau, and Nethen.

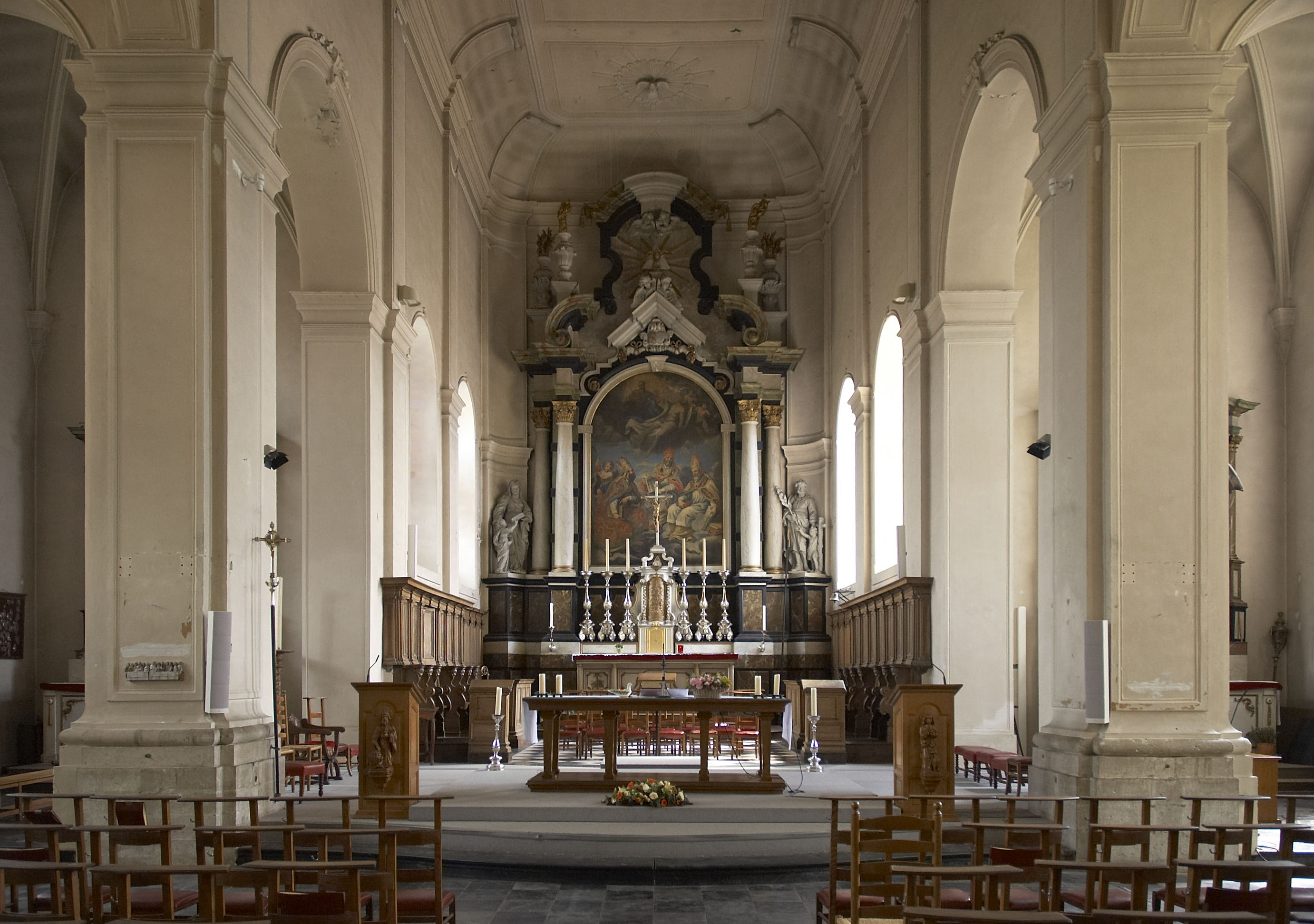
Altar of Saint George's church, Grez-Doiceau

== Notable people ==
The Nobel Prize-winning cytologist and biochemist Christian de Duve (1917–2013) died in Grez-Doiceau.
