= Arthur De Greef (tennis) =

Belgian tennis player

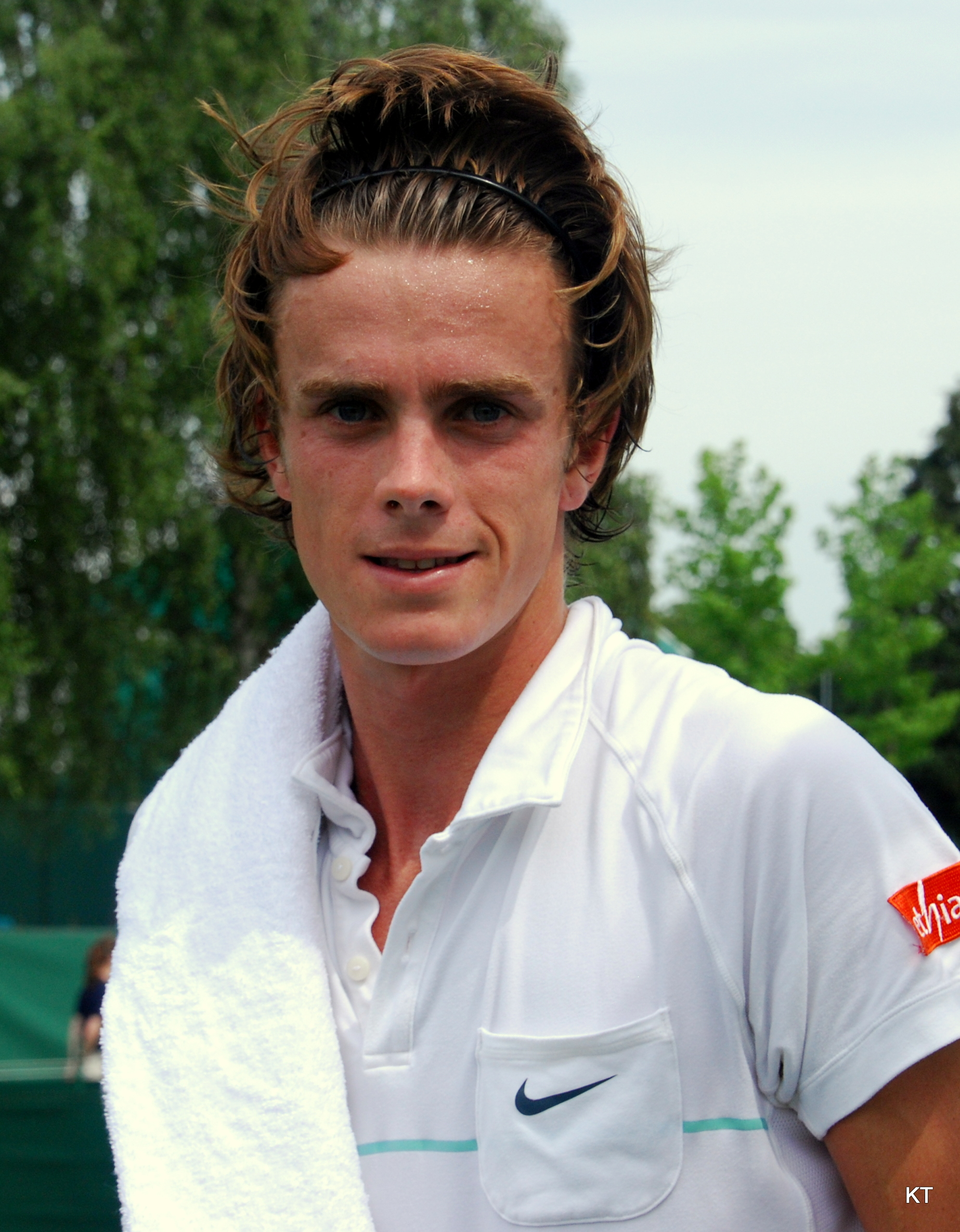
- De Greef at the 2013 Wimbledon Championships
- Full name: Arthur De Greef
- Country (sports): Belgium
- Residence: Sint-Genesius-Rode, Belgium
- Born: 27 March 1992 (age 33) Brussels, Belgium
- Height: 1.83 m (6 ft 0 in)
- Turned pro: 2010
- Retired: 2021
- Plays: Right-handed (two-handed backhand)
- Coach: Maxime Halflants
- Prize money: $450,036

Singles
- Career record: 3–7
- Career titles: 0
- Highest ranking: No. 113 (19 June 2017)

Grand Slam singles results
- Australian Open: Q1 (2015, 2017, 2018, 2019, 2021)
- French Open: 1R (2017)
- Wimbledon: Q2 (2013)
- US Open: Q1 (2016)

Doubles
- Career record: 0–2
- Career titles: 0
- Highest ranking: No. 597 (4 March 2013)

Team competitions
- Davis Cup: F (2017)
- Last updated on: 8 March 2021.

Arthur De Greef (Dutch pronunciation: [ˈɑrtyːr də ˈɣreːf]; born 27 March 1992) is a former Belgian tennis player. De Greef has a career-high ATP singles ranking of No. 113, achieved on 19 June 2017 and has a career high ATP doubles ranking of No. 597 achieved on 4 March 2013. De Greef made his ATP main draw singles debut at the 2015 Grand Prix Hassan II where he qualified for the main draw and defeated the 8th seed Diego Schwartzman in the first round.

In May 2021, De Greef was provisionally suspended for match-fixing by ITIA. De Greef was criminally convicted of fraud and working for a criminal organization by the Belgian courts in 2023, refusing to cooperate with interviews. The ITIA subsequently banned him from professional tennis for three years and 9 months, and he was also fined $45,000 ($31,500 suspended).

== Challenger and Futures finals ==
=== Singles: 25 (12–13) ===
Legend (singles) ATP Challenger Tour (2–5) ITF Futures Tour (10–8)	Titles by surface Hard (0–2) Clay (12–10) Grass (0–0) Carpet (0–1)

Result	W–L	Date	Tournament	Tier	Surface	Opponent	Score
Loss	0–1	Oct 2009	Greece F2, Paros	Futures	Carpet	(Italy) Claudio Grassi	5–7, 4–6
Loss	0–2	Apr 2011	Great Britain F5, Bournemouth	Futures	Clay	(Italy) Enrico Burzi	6–7^{(2–7)}, 5–7
Loss	0–3	Jul 2012	Belgium F1, De Haan	Futures	Clay	(Belgium) Niels Desein	2–6, 6–4, 3–6
Win	1–3	Jul 2012	Armenia F1, Yerevan	Futures	Clay	(Russia) Nikoloz Basilashvili	6–0, 6–1
Win	2–3	Aug 2012	Latvia F1, Jūrmala	Futures	Clay	(Latvia) Andis Juška	6–3, 1–0 ret.
Loss	2–4	Nov 2012	Turkey F45, Antalya	Futures	Hard	(Bosnia and Herzegovina) Aldin Šetkić	2–6, 0–1 ret.
Loss	2–5	Jan 2013	USA F3, Weston	Futures	Clay	(United States) Bjorn Fratangelo	4–6, 6–3, 0–6
Win	3–5	Feb 2013	USA F4, Palm Coast	Futures	Clay	(United States) Bjorn Fratangelo	6–2, 6–3
Loss	3–6	Mar 2014	Italy F5, Santa Margherita di Pula	Futures	Clay	(Czech Republic) Adam Pavlásek	3–6, 3–6
Win	4–6	Apr 2014	Colombia F1, Pereira	Futures	Clay	(Brazil) Fabiano de Paula	6–2, 6–3
Loss	4–7	Apr 2014	Colombia F2, Pereira	Futures	Clay	(Colombia) Nicolás Barrientos	6–4, 3–6, 2–6
Win	5–7	May 2014	Spain F9, Valldoreix	Futures	Clay	(Spain) Juan-Samuel Arauzo-Martínez	7–6^{(7–2)}, 6–3
Win	6–7	Jul 2014	Spain F18, Gandia	Futures	Clay	(India) Ramkumar Ramanathan	6–4, 4–6, 6–3
Loss	6–8	Feb 2015	Tunisia F5, El Kantaoui	Futures	Hard	(France) Mathias Bourgue	6–2, 4–6, 6–7^{(6–8)}
Win	7–8	Sep 2015	Spain F30, Sevilla	Futures	Clay	(Brazil) Rafael Camilo	7–6^{(7–4)}, 7–6^{(7–5)}
Win	8–8	Oct 2015	Italy F29, Santa Margherita di Pula	Futures	Clay	(Italy) Antonio Massara	6–4, 6–4
Win	9–8	Oct 2015	Portugal F13, Porto	Futures	Clay	(Portugal) João Domingues	6–4, 6–0
Loss	9–9	Jan 2016	Buenos Aires, Argentina	Challenger	Clay	(Argentina) Facundo Bagnis	3–6, 2–6
Win	10–9	Mar 2016	Tunisia F10, Hammamet	Futures	Clay	(Portugal) Pedro Sousa	1–6, 6–1, 6–2
Loss	10–10	Apr 2016	Napoli, Italy	Challenger	Clay	(Slovakia) Jozef Kovalík	3–6, 2–6
Win	11–10	Aug 2016	Liberec, Czech Republic	Challenger	Clay	(Belgium) Steve Darcis	7–6^{(7–4)}, 6–3
Loss	11–11	Nov 2016	Guayaquil, Ecuador	Challenger	Clay	(Argentina) Nicolás Kicker	3–6, 2–6
Win	12–11	May 2018	Ostrava, Czech Republic	Challenger	Clay	(Croatia) Nino Serdarušić	4–6, 6–4, 6–2
Loss	12–12	Jun 2018	Poprad-Tatry, Slovakia	Challenger	Clay	(Slovakia) Jozef Kovalík	4–6, 0–6
Loss	12–13	May 2019	Heilbronn, Germany	Challenger	Clay	(Serbia) Filip Krajinović	3–6, 1–6

=== Doubles: 4 (3–1) ===
Legend (doubles) ATP Challenger Tour (0–0) ITF Futures Tour (3–1)	Titles by surface Hard (1–0) Clay (2–0) Grass (0–0) Carpet (0–0)

Result	W–L	Date	Tournament	Tier	Surface	Partner	Opponents	Score
Loss	0–1	Mar 2012	Great Britain F5, Bath	Futures	Hard (i)	(Belgium) Yannik Reuter	(United Kingdom) Lewis Burton (United Kingdom) Edward Corrie	3–6, 4–6
Win	1–1	Apr 2012	Great Britain F6, Bournemouth	Futures	Clay	(France) Jérôme Inzerillo	(United Kingdom) Keelan Oakley (United Kingdom) Matthew Short	3–6, 6–1, [10–8]
Win	2–1	May 2012	Great Britain F7, Edinburgh	Futures	Clay	(France) Jérôme Inzerillo	(France) Gleb Sakharov (France) Alexandre Sidorenko	7–6^{(7–5)}, 3–6, [10–8]
Win	3–1	Nov 2012	Turkey F44, Antalya	Futures	Hard	(Belgium) Julien Cagnina	(Austria) Michael Linzer (Germany) Marc Sieber	6–1, 6–7^{(3–7)}, [10–5]
