= André Ghem =

Brazilian tennis player (born 1982)

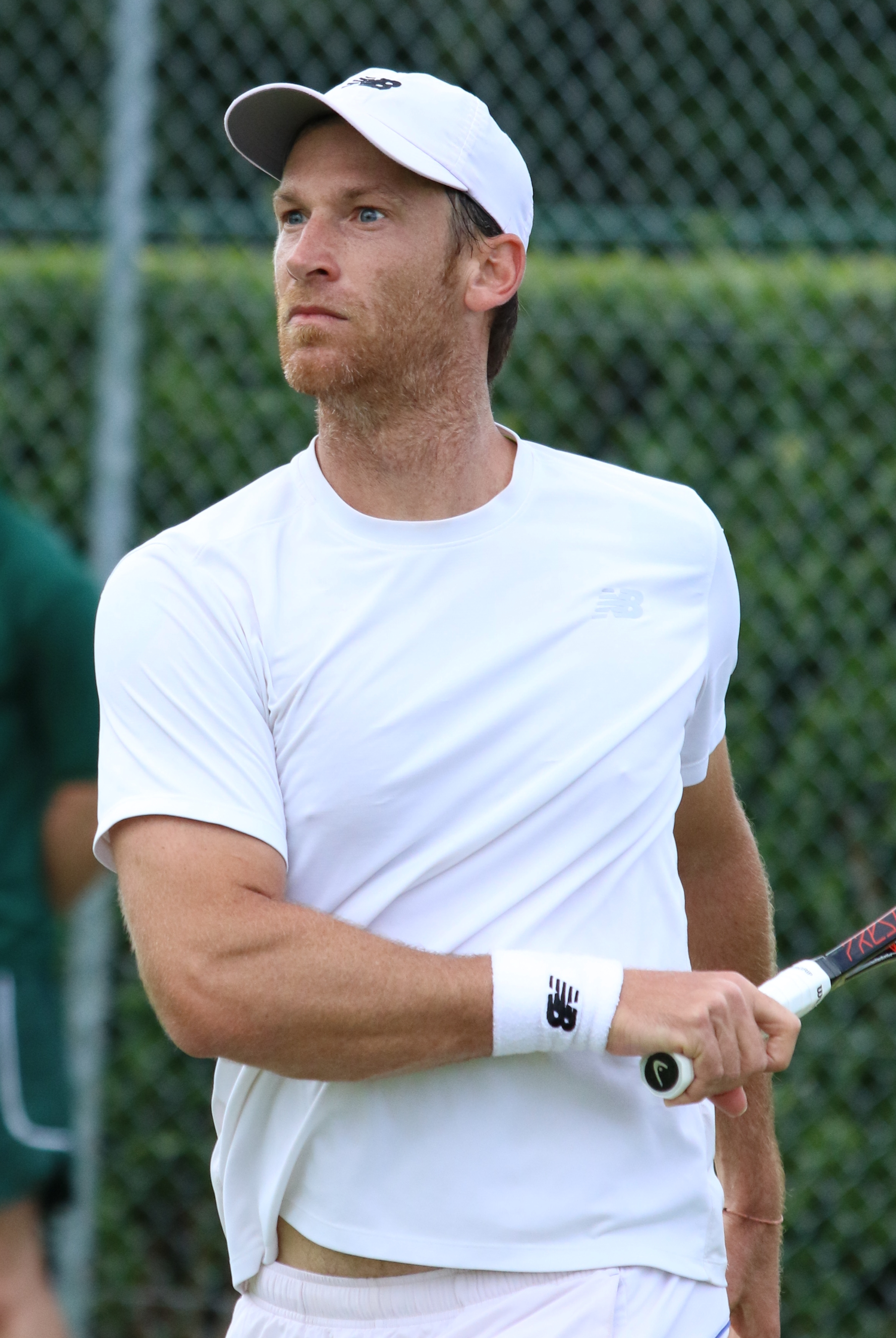
- André Ghem in 2016
- Country (sports): Brazil
- Residence: Novo Hamburgo, Brazil
- Born: 29 May 1982 (age 44) Porto Alegre, Brazil
- Height: 1.93 m (6 ft 4 in)
- Turned pro: 2003
- Plays: Right-handed
- Prize money: $ 534,802

Singles
- Career record: 2–5 (ATP Tour level, Grand Slam level, and Davis Cup)
- Career titles: 0
- Highest ranking: No. 118 (27 July 2015)

Grand Slam singles results
- Australian Open: Q3 (2012, 2017)
- French Open: Q3 (2014, 2015)
- Wimbledon: Q2 (2014)
- US Open: Q2 (2013)

Doubles
- Career record: 1–2 (ATP Tour level, Grand Slam level, and Davis Cup)
- Career titles: 0
- Highest ranking: No. 88 (25 June 2007)

André Swytka Ghem (born 29 May 1982), also known as German, is a former Brazilian professional tennis player. He reached his highest ATP singles ranking in July 2015, when he became the World No. 118.

== Career ==
Born in Porto Alegre, Brazil and a right-handed tennis player, Ghem turned professional in 2003 and became the World No. 181 in August 2006. The highlights of his career include reaching a career-high singles ranking of world No. 118 and doubles ranking of No. 88 by the ATP.

The main and most memorable moment of his career came when he defeated Gustavo Kuerten at the ATP Costa do Sauípe in Bahia as an unknown player in 2006. The score was 3–6, 6–3, 6–4.

In 2011, he advanced through the qualifying rounds of the ATP 250 Brasil Open in São Paulo but was eliminated in the first round by Argentine player Carlos Berlocq.

His main singles title came at the Joinville Challenger in 2007. After that, he reached six more ATP Challenger Tour singles finals but lost all of them: in Smarkan (2008), Rio Quente (2013), Campinas and Prague (2014), and Shenzhen and Tampere (2015). In doubles, he won nine Challenger titles and finished runner-up on twelve occasions.

Nowadays, Ghem is a tennis commentator at the ESPN Brazil sports channels and the Disney+ Brazil streaming platform.

== Titles (14) ==
=== Challengers and futures (5) ===
Challengers (1)
Futures (4)

No.	Date	Tournament	Surface	Opponent in the final	Score
1.	16 August 2004	Caldas Novas	Outdoor Hard	(Brazil) Júlio Silva	6–2, 7–5
2.	1 November 2004	Campinas	Clay	(Brazil) Francisco Costa	7–5, 6–3
3.	7 August 2006	Joinville	Clay	(Mexico) Bruno Echagaray	6–1, 6–4
4.	1 November 2010	Porto Alegre	Clay	(Brazil) André Miele	6–4, 6–1
5.	24 January 2011	João Pessoa	Clay	(Brazil) Tiago Lopes	6–4, 5–7, 7–6^{(1)}

=== Doubles (9) ===
Legend Grand Slam (0) Tennis Masters Cup (0) ATP Masters Series (0) ATP Tour (0) Challengers (9)	Titles by surface Hard (1) Grass (0) Clay (8) Carpet (0)

No.	Date	Tournament	Surface	Partnering	Opponents in the final	Score
1.	24 April 2006	Mexico City, Mexico	Hard	(Canada) Pierre-Ludovic Duclos	(South Africa) Rik de Voest (United States) Glenn Weiner	6–4, 0–6, [10–3]
2.	7 August 2006	Joinville, Brazil	Clay	(Brazil) Alexandre Simoni	(Brazil) Marcelo Melo (Brazil) André Sá	6–4, 5–7, [10–8]
3.	9 October 2006	Medellín, Colombia	Clay	(Brazil) Marcelo Melo	(Uruguay) Pablo Cuevas (Argentina) Horacio Zeballos	Walkover
4.	6 November 2006	Buenos Aires, Argentina	Clay	(Brazil) Flávio Saretta	(Germany) Tomas Behrend (Spain) Marcel Granollers	6–1, 6–4
5.	13 November 2006	Asunción, Paraguay	Clay	(Germany) Tomas Behrend	(Argentina) Carlos Berlocq (Argentina) Martín Vassallo Argüello	3–6, 6–3, [10–3]
6.	14 May 2007	Zagreb, Croatia	Clay	(Germany) Tomas Behrend	(United Kingdom) James Auckland (United Kingdom) Jamie Delgado	6–2, 6–1
7.	4 June 2007	Furth, Germany	Clay	(Mexico) Bruno Echagaray	(Italy) Fabio Fognini (Portugal) Frederico Gil	7–6^{(1)}, 4–6, [13–11]
8.	22 July 2012	Bercuit, Belgium	Clay	(Argentina) Marco Trungelliti	(Argentina) Facundo Bagnis (Argentina) Pablo Galdón	6–1, 6–2
9.	24 January 2016	Rio de Janeiro, Brazil	Clay	(Portugal) Gastão Elias	(France) Jonathan Eysseric (Mexico) Miguel Ángel Reyes-Varela	6–4, 7–6^{(7–2)}

== Runners-up (7) ==
=== Singles (1) ===
Legend Grand Slam (0) Tennis Masters Cup (0) ATP Masters Series (0) ATP Tour (0) Challengers (1)	Finals by surface Hard (0) Grass (0) Clay (1) Carpet (0)

No.	Date	Tournament	Surface	Opponent	Score
1.	4 August 2008	Samarkand, Uzbekistan	Clay	(Russia) Mikhail Elgin	7–6^{(7–4)}, 6–3

=== Doubles (6) ===
Legend Grand Slam (0) Tennis Masters Cup (0) ATP Masters Series (0) ATP Tour (0) Challengers (6)	Finals by surface Hard (3) Grass (0) Clay (3) Carpet (0)

No.	Date	Tournament	Surface	Partner	Opponents	Score
1.	2 January 2006	São Paulo, Brazil	Hard	(Brazil) Lucas Engel	(Brazil) Thiago Alves (Brazil) Flávio Saretta	7–6^{(12–10)}, 6–3
2.	13 March 2006	Salinas, Ecuador	Hard	(Brazil) Alexandre Simoni	(Brazil) Thiago Alves (Brazil) Júlio Silva	3–6, 6–4, [10–4]
3.	14 July 2008	Oberstaufen, Germany	Clay	(Netherlands) Boy Westerhof	(Czech Republic) Dušan Karol (Czech Republic) Jaroslav Pospíšil	6–7^{(2–7)}, 6–1, [10–6]
4.	21 July 2008	Penza, Russia	Hard	(Netherlands) Boy Westerhof	(Uzbekistan) Denis Istomin (Russia) Evgeniy Kirillov	6–2, 3–6, [10–6]
5.	28 April 2012	São Paulo, Brazil	Clay	(Brazil) João Pedro Sorgi	(Chile) Paul Capdeville (Brazil) Marcel Felder	7–5, 6–3
6.	29 July 2012	Tampere, Finland	Clay	(Belgium) Niels Desein	(Austria) Michael Linzer (Austria) Gerald Melzer	1–6, 6–7^{(3–7)}
