= Facundo Bagnis =

Argentine tennis player (born 1990)

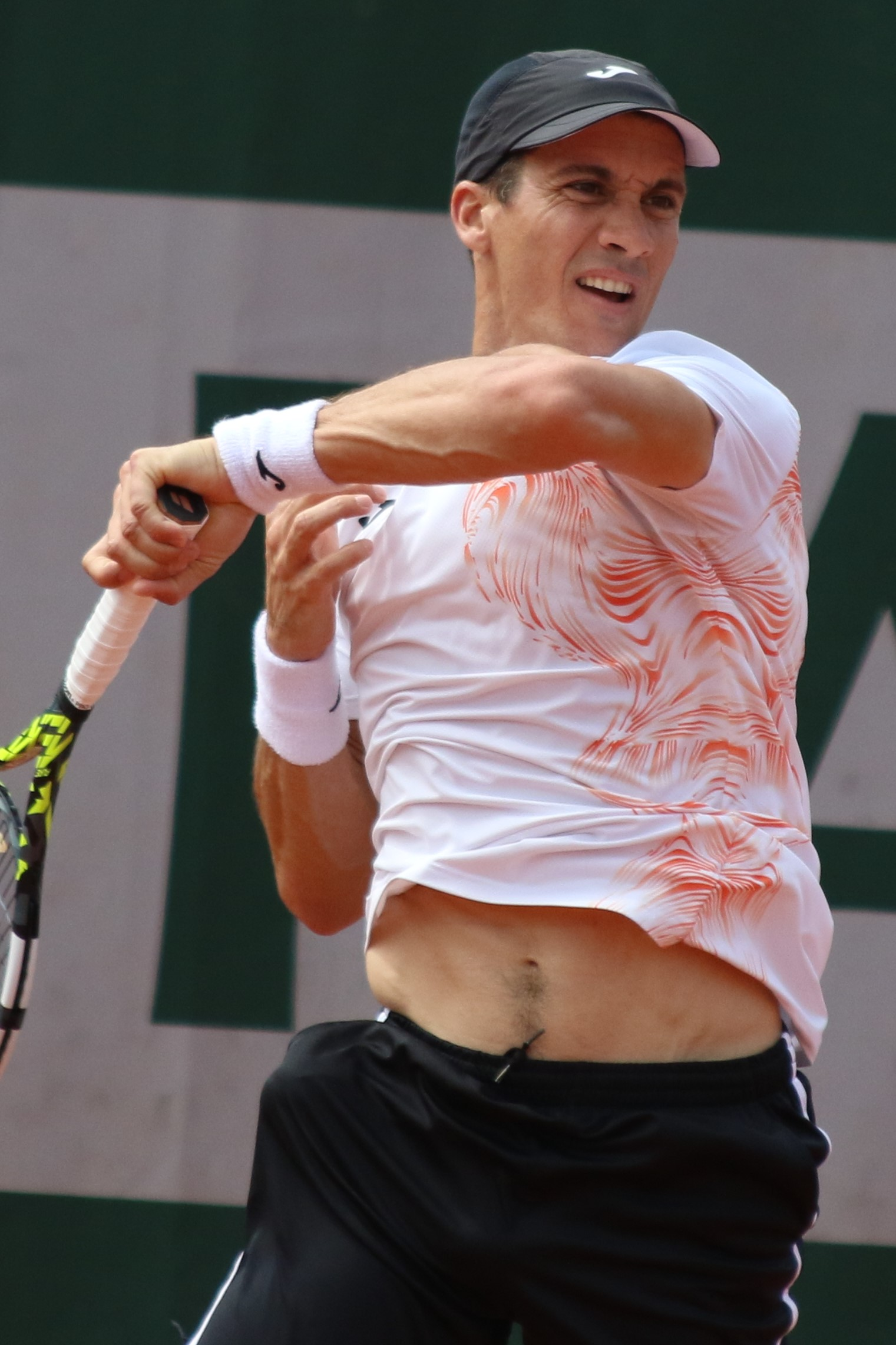
- Bagnis at the 2023 French Open
- Country (sports): Argentina
- Residence: Armstrong, Santa Fe, Argentina
- Born: 27 February 1990 (age 36) Rosario, Santa Fe, Argentina
- Height: 183 cm (6 ft 0 in)
- Turned pro: 2007
- Retired: Sep 2025 (last match played before suspension)
- Plays: Left-handed (two-handed backhand)
- Coach: Antonio Pastorino
- Prize money: US$3,287,741

Singles
- Career record: 45–89
- Career titles: 0
- Highest ranking: No. 55 (14 November 2016)

Grand Slam singles results
- Australian Open: 1R (2017, 2022, 2023)
- French Open: 2R (2014, 2016, 2021)
- Wimbledon: 1R (2015, 2016, 2017, 2021, 2022)
- US Open: 3R (2021)

Other tournaments
- Olympic Games: 1R (2020)

Doubles
- Career record: 31–39
- Career titles: 1
- Highest ranking: No. 78 (30 September 2013)

Grand Slam doubles results
- Australian Open: 1R (2017, 2022, 2023)
- French Open: 1R (2014, 2017)
- Wimbledon: 1R (2021, 2022)
- US Open: 1R (2021)

Other doubles tournaments
- Olympic Games: 1R (2020)
Medal record
Representing Argentina
Men's Tennis
Pan American Games
Gold medal – first place	2015 Toronto	Men's singles
Silver medal – second place	2015 Toronto	Men's doubles
Silver medal – second place	2019 Lima	Men's doubles
South American Games
Gold medal – first place	2014 Santiago	Men's singles
Gold medal – first place	2014 Santiago	Men's doubles
- Last updated on: 15 April 2026.

Facundo Bagnis (Spanish pronunciation: [faˈkundo ˈβaɣnis]; (Note: In isolation, Bagnis is pronounced [ˈbaɣnis]; The pronunciation in the reference is [faˈkundo | ˈbaɡnis], with a pause before the surname.) born 27 February 1990) is an Argentine professional tennis player. He has a career-high singles ranking of World No. 55 reached in November 2016. Bagnis competed mainly on the ATP Challenger Tour where he has won 17 singles titles. He also won one ATP doubles title in Stuttgart.

== Tennis career ==
=== 2011-2013: ATP debut and first win, Maiden ATP title ===
Bagnis played in his first ATP World Tour match at the 2011 Movistar Open on January 31, 2011, losing to Santiago Giraldo in three sets. He won his first tour-level match at 2012 Copa Claro, beating Leonardo Mayer.

=== 2014-2016: First win, No. 56 year-end ranking ===
Bagnis secured his biggest victory and first win at the Grand Slam level on his debut when he defeated Julien Benneteau in the first round of the 2014 French Open, winning the deciding set 18–16. He finished the 2016 season at a career-best year-end high of No. 56.

=== 2021-2022: First ATP singles final, US Open third round ===
In 2021, Bagnis reached his first ATP semifinal at the Córdoba Open, where he lost to fifth seed Albert Ramos Viñolas in three sets. Two weeks later, at the Chile Open, he would go even further by making his first ATP final, where he lost to top seed Cristian Garín.

Bagnis qualified to represent Argentina at the delayed Tokyo Summer Olympics. At the 2021 US Open, he reached the third round of a Major for the first time in his career, defeating Taro Daniel and qualifier and fellow Argentine Marco Trungelliti. He finished 2021 at a second-best year-end high of No. 76.

On 21 November 2022, following a Challenger title in Ambato, Ecuador, and a Challenger final in São Leopoldo, Brazil, he returned to the top 100 at a third best year-end high of No. 93.

=== 2024-2025: Second ATP final, 45th career win ===
Ranked No. 207, as a qualifier at the 2024 Córdoba Open he recorded his 40th career main draw win, defeating wildcard Juan Manuel Cerúndolo. Next, he defeated eight seed Roberto Carballes Baena to reach the quarterfinals in straight sets. He reached his third career ATP semifinal defeating Jaume Munar also in straight sets. At 33 years old, he became the oldest Argentine ATP Tour semifinalist since Carlos Berlocq, 34, in 2017 Buenos Aires. He reached his second career final defeating previous year runner-up Federico Coria. He was the oldest player from South America to make an ATP event final in the Open Era surpassing Guillermo Vilas in 1986 Forest Hills. As a result, he climbed close to 70 positions up to return to the top 150. In just the third all-qualifier final since the inception of the ATP Tour in 1990, he lost to Luciano Darderi in straight sets. He again lost to Luciano Darderi at the 2024 Chile Open where he entered the main draw as a lucky loser.

In July 2025, he qualified for the 2025 National Bank Open and won his first ATP 1000 match since April 2024 in Madrid, defeating Vasek Pospisil in what was Pospisil last career match.

In July 2026, Bagnis was issued with a 12-month ban backdated to the beginning of his provisional suspension in October 2025 in relation to an anti-doping rule violation for unintentional use of hydrochlorothiazide.

== ATP Tour career finals ==
=== Singles: 2 (0-2) ===
Legend (singles) Grand Slam tournaments (0–0) ATP Finals (0–0) ATP Tour Masters 1000 (0–0) ATP Tour 500 Series (0–0) ATP Tour 250 Series (0–2)	Finals by surface Hard (0–0) Clay (0–2) Grass (0–0)	Finals by setting Outdoor (0–2) Indoor (0–0)

Result	W–L	Date	Tournament	Tier	Surface	Opponent	Score
Loss	0–1	Mar 2021	Chile Open, Chile	250 Series	Clay	(Chile) Cristian Garín	4–6, 7–6^{(7–3)}, 5–7
Loss	0–2	Feb 2024	Córdoba Open, Argentina	250 Series	Clay	(Italy) Luciano Darderi	1–6, 4–6

=== Doubles: 1 (1 title) ===
Legend (doubles) Grand Slam tournaments (0–0) ATP Finals (0–0) ATP Tour Masters 1000 (0–0) ATP Tour 500 Series (0–0) ATP Tour 250 Series (1–0)	Finals by surface Hard (0–0) Clay (1–0) Grass (0–0)	Finals by setting Outdoor (1–0) Indoor (0–0)

Result	W–L	Date	Tournament	Tier	Surface	Partner	Opponents	Score
Win	1–0	Jul 2013	Stuttgart Open, Germany	250 Series	Clay	(Brazil) Thomaz Bellucci	(Poland) Tomasz Bednarek (Poland) Mateusz Kowalczyk	2–6, 6–4, [11–9]

== ATP Challenger and ITF Tour finals ==
=== Singles: 37 (22–15) ===
Legend (singles) ATP Challenger Tour (17–14) Futures/ITF World Tennis Tour (5–1)	Finals by surface Hard (0–0) Clay (22–15)

Result	W–L	Date	Tournament	Tier	Surface	Opponent	Score
Loss	0–1	Sep 2008	Bolivia F1, Santa Cruz de la Sierra	Futures	Clay	(Argentina) Cristhian Ignacio Benedetti	6–4, 4–6, 6–7^{(3–7)}
Win	1–1	Sep 2008	Bolivia F3, La Paz	Futures	Clay	(Argentina) Guillermo Carry	7–5, 7–6^{(7–3)}
Win	2–1	Aug 2009	Ecuador F3, Quito	Futures	Clay	(Peru) Mauricio Echazú	7–5, 6–2
Win	3–1	Sep 2009	Bolivia F3, La Paz	Futures	Clay	(United States) Adam El Mihdawy	6–3, 6–2
Win	4–1	Nov 2009	Argentina F24, Resistencia	Futures	Clay	(Argentina) Juan-Pablo Villar	6–2, 2–0 ret.
Loss	4–2	Jun 2010	Bytom, Poland	Challenger	Clay	(Spain) Pere Riba	0–6, 3–6
Win	5–2	Dec 2010	Brazil F36, Araçatuba	Futures	Clay	(Brazil) Eládio Ribeiro Neto	6–2, 6–3
Win	6–2	Apr 2011	Barranquilla, Colombia	Challenger	Clay	(Argentina) Diego Junqueira	1–6, 7–6^{(7–4)}, 6–0
Win	7–2	Jul 2012	Arad, Romania	Challenger	Clay	(Romania) Victor Hănescu	6–4, 6–4
Win	8–2	Mar 2013	Santiago, Chile	Challenger	Clay	(Netherlands) Thiemo de Bakker	7–6^{(7–2)}, 7–6^{(7–3)}
Loss	8–3	Apr 2013	Barranquilla, Colombia	Challenger	Clay	(Argentina) Federico Delbonis	3–6, 2–6
Win	9–3	Sep 2013	Cali, Colombia	Challenger	Clay	(Argentina) Facundo Argüello	2–6, 6–4, 6–3
Loss	9–4	Sep 2013	Campinas, Brazil	Challenger	Clay	(Brazil) Guilherme Clezar	4–6, 4–6
Loss	9–5	Nov 2013	Lima, Peru	Challenger	Clay	(Argentina) Horacio Zeballos	7–6^{(7–4)}, 3–6, 3–6
Loss	9–6	Jun 2014	Caltanissetta, Italy	Challenger	Clay	(Spain) Pablo Carreño Busta	6–4, 4–6, 1–6
Win	10–6	Mar 2015	Santiago, Chile	Challenger	Clay	(Brazil) Guilherme Clezar	6–2, 5–7, 6–2
Loss	10–7	Apr 2015	Sarasota, USA	Challenger	Clay	(Argentina) Federico Delbonis	4–6, 2–6
Win	11–7	Jan 2016	Buenos Aires, Argentina	Challenger	Clay	(Belgium) Arthur De Greef	6–3, 6–2
Win	12–7	Jan 2016	Rio de Janeiro, Brazil	Challenger	Clay	(Brazil) Guilherme Clezar	6–4, 4–6, 6–2
Win	13–7	Mar 2016	Santiago, Chile	Challenger	Clay	(Brazil) Rogério Dutra Silva	6–7^{(3–7)}, 6–4, 6–3
Win	14–7	Oct 2016	Medellín, Colombia	Challenger	Clay	(Brazil) Caio Zampieri	6–7^{(3–7)}, 7–5, 6–2
Win	15–7	Oct 2016	Campinas, Brazil	Challenger	Clay	(Argentina) Carlos Berlocq	5–7, 6–2, 3–0 ret.
Win	16–7	Nov 2016	Bogotá, Colombia	Challenger	Clay	(Argentina) Horacio Zeballos	3–6, 6–3, 7–6^{(7–4)}
Loss	16–8	Nov 2017	Guayaquil, Ecuador	Challenger	Clay	(Austria) Gerald Melzer	3–6, 1–6
Loss	16–9	Apr 2018	Sarasota, USA	Challenger	Clay	(Bolivia) Hugo Dellien	6–2, 4–6, 2–6
Win	17–9	Jun 2018	L'Aquila, Italy	Challenger	Clay	(Italy) Paolo Lorenzi	2–6, 6–3, 6–4
Loss	17–10	May 2019	Braga, Portugal	Challenger	Clay	(Portugal) João Domingues	7–6^{(7–5)}, 2–6, 3–6
Loss	17–11	May 2019	Lisbon, Portugal	Challenger	Clay	(Spain) Roberto Carballés Baena	6–2, 6–7^{(5–7)}, 1–6
Loss	17–12	Sep 2019	Buenos Aires, Argentina	Challenger	Clay	(India) Sumit Nagal	4–6, 2–6
Win	18–12	Oct 2020	Biella, Italy	Challenger	Clay	(Slovenia) Blaž Kavčič	6–7^{(4–7)}, 6–4, ret
Loss	18–13	May 2021	Oeiras, Portugal	Challenger	Clay	(Spain) Carlos Alcaraz	4–6, 4–6
Win	19–13	Jul 2021	Salzburg, Austria	Challenger	Clay	(Argentina) Federico Coria	6–4, 3–6, 6–2
Win	20–13	Mar 2022	Pereira, Colombia	Challenger	Clay	(Argentina) Facundo Mena	6–3, 6–0
Win	21–13	Oct 2022	Ambato, Ecuador	Challenger	Clay	(Brazil) João Lucas Reis da Silva	7–6^{(9–7)}, 6–4
Loss	21–14	Nov 2022	São Leopoldo, Brazil	Challenger	Clay	(Peru) Juan Pablo Varillas	6–7^{(5–7)}, 6–4, 4–6
Win	22–14	Jan 2024	Buenos Aires, Argentina	Challenger	Clay	(Argentina) Mariano Navone	7–5, 1–6, 7–5
Loss	22–15	Mar 2024	Santiago, Chile	Challenger	Clay	(Peru) Juan Pablo Varillas	3–6, 2–6

=== Doubles: 39 (23–16) ===
Legend (doubles) ATP Challenger Tour (15–12) Futures/ITF World Tennis Tour (8–4)	Finals by surface Hard (0–0) Clay (23–16)

Result	W–L	Date	Tournament	Tier	Surface	Partner	Opponents	Score
Win	1–0	Aug 2007	Peru F3, Arequipa	Futures	Clay	(Peru) Sergio Galdós	(Colombia) Francisco Franco (Peru) Matías Silva	6–4, 7–6^{(9–7)}
Win	2–0	Sep 2007	Bolivia F2, Cochabamba	Futures	Clay	(Argentina) Agustín Picco	(Bolivia) Mauricio Doria-Medina (Bolivia) Mauricio Estívariz	6–3, 6–3
Win	3–0	May 2008	Argentina F1, Reconquista	Futures	Clay	(Argentina) Agustín Picco	(Argentina) Marcos Conocente (Argentina) Juan-Manuel Romanazzi	6–3, 3–6, [10–7]
Loss	3–1	May 2008	Argentina F2, Corrientes	Futures	Clay	(Argentina) Agustín Picco	(Argentina) Guillermo Bujniewicz (Argentina) Nicolás Jara-Lozano	6–7^{(10–12)}, 5–7
Loss	3–2	May 2008	Argentina F3, Resistencia	Futures	Clay	(Argentina) Agustín Picco	(Argentina) Martín Alund (Argentina) Gastón-Arturo Grimolizzi	5–7, 2–6
Win	4–2	Jul 2008	Paraguay F2, Lambaré	Futures	Clay	(Argentina) Martín Alund	(Chile) Rodrigo Pérez (Argentina) Sebastián Uriarte	6–3, 6–1
Loss	4–3	Jul 2008	Paraguay F3, Lambaré	Futures	Clay	(Argentina) Martín Alund	(Brazil) Alexandre Bonatto (Argentina) Juan-Pablo Yunis	6–2, 1–6, [12–14]
Loss	4–4	Sep 2008	Bolivia F2, Cochabamba	Futures	Clay	(Argentina) Agustín Picco	(Argentina) Guillermo Carry (Argentina) Andrés Molteni	2–6, 4–6
Win	5–4	Dec 2008	Argentina F18, Salta	Futures	Clay	(Argentina) Leandro Migani	(Argentina) Patricio Heras (Argentina) Roberto Eduardo Ramírez	7–5, 7–5
Win	6–4	May 2009	Argentina F5, Villa María	Futures	Clay	(Argentina) Diego Cristin	(Spain) Rodrigo Gómez Saigos (Argentina) Hector Damián Guichonet	6–4, 6–2
Win	7–4	Sep 2009	Bolivia F2, Cochabamba	Futures	Clay	(Argentina) Guillermo Carry	(Bolivia) Mauricio Doria-Medina (Italy) Daniel Alejandro López	6–4, 2–6, [10–5]
Win	8–4	Sep 2009	Bolivia F4, Tarija	Futures	Clay	(Argentina) Guillermo Carry	(Bolivia) Mauricio Estívariz (Bolivia) Federico Zeballos	6–2, 6–2
Win	9–4	Mar 2011	Salinas, Ecuador	Challenger	Clay	(Argentina) Federico Delbonis	(Brazil) Rogério Dutra Silva (Brazil) João Souza	6–2, 6–1
Loss	9–5	Jun 2011	Košice, Slovakia	Challenger	Clay	(Argentina) Eduardo Schwank	(Germany) Simon Greul (Germany) Bastian Knittel	6–2, 3–6, [9–11]
Loss	9–6	Sep 2011	Cali, Colombia	Challenger	Clay	(Argentina) Eduardo Schwank	(Colombia) Juan Sebastián Cabal (Colombia) Robert Farah	5–7, 2–6
Loss	9–7	Jul 2012	Bercuit, Belgium	Challenger	Clay	(Argentina) Pablo Galdón	(Brazil) André Ghem (Argentina) Marco Trungelliti	1–6, 2–6
Win	10–7	Oct 2012	Villa Allende, Argentina	Challenger	Clay	(Argentina) Diego Junqueira	(Uruguay) Ariel Behar (Argentina) Guillermo Durán	6–1, 6–2
Win	11–7	Nov 2012	Guayaquil, Ecuador	Challenger	Clay	(Argentina) Martín Alund	(Argentina) Leonardo Mayer (Argentina) Martín Ríos-Benítez	7–5, 7–6^{(7–5)}
Loss	11–8	Mar 2013	Pereira, Colombia	Challenger	Clay	(Argentina) Federico Delbonis	(Colombia) Nicolás Barrientos (Colombia) Eduardo Struvay	6–3, 3–6, [6–10]
Win	12–8	Apr 2013	Barranquilla, Colombia	Challenger	Clay	(Argentina) Federico Delbonis	(Brazil) Fabiano de Paula (Italy) Stefano Ianni	6–3, 7–5
Loss	12–9	Jun 2013	Arad, Romania	Challenger	Clay	(Ecuador) Julio César Campozano	(Croatia) Franko Škugor (Croatia) Antonio Veić	6–7^{(5–7)}, 6–4, [9–11]
Loss	12–10	Oct 2013	San Juan, Argentina	Challenger	Clay	(Argentina) Martín Alund	(Argentina) Guillermo Durán (Argentina) Máximo González	3–6, 0–6
Loss	12–11	Apr 2014	Savannah, USA	Challenger	Clay	(Russia) Alex Bogomolov Jr.	(Serbia) Ilija Bozoljac (New Zealand) Michael Venus	5–7, 2–6
Win	13–11	May 2014	Cali, Colombia	Challenger	Clay	(Argentina) Eduardo Schwank	(Colombia) Nicolás Barrientos (Colombia) Eduardo Struvay	6–3, 6–3
Win	14–11	Sep 2014	Campinas, Brazil	Challenger	Clay	(Argentina) Diego Schwartzman	(Brazil) André Ghem (Brazil) Fabrício Neis	7–6^{(7–4)}, 5–7, [10–7]
Loss	14–12	Sep 2014	Porto Alegre, Brazil	Challenger	Clay	(Argentina) Diego Schwartzman	(Argentina) Guido Andreozzi (Argentina) Guillermo Durán	3–6, 3–6
Win	15–12	Oct 2014	San Juan, Argentina	Challenger	Clay	(Argentina) Martín Alund	(Argentina) Diego Schwartzman (Argentina) Horacio Zeballos	4–6, 6–3, [10–7]
Win	16–12	Apr 2015	Sarasota, USA	Challenger	Clay	(Argentina) Facundo Argüello	(South Korea) Chung Hyeon (India) Divij Sharan	3–6, 6–2, [13–11]
Win	17–12	May 2015	Vicenza, Italy	Challenger	Clay	(Argentina) Guido Pella	(Italy) Salvatore Caruso (Italy) Federico Gaio	6–2, 6–4
Loss	17–13	Jun 2015	Mestre, Italy	Challenger	Clay	(Peru) Sergio Galdós	(Italy) Flavio Cipolla (Italy) Potito Starace	7–5, 6–7^{(3–7)}, [4–10]
Win	18–13	Jan 2016	Buenos Aires, Argentina	Challenger	Clay	(Argentina) Máximo González	(Peru) Sergio Galdós (Sweden) Christian Lindell	6–1, 6–2
Loss	18–14	Mar 2016	Santiago, Chile	Challenger	Clay	(Argentina) Máximo González	(Chile) Julio Peralta (Chile) Hans Podlipnik Castillo	6–7^{(4–7)}, 6–4, [5–10]
Win	19–14	Mar 2018	Punta del Este, Uruguay	Challenger	Clay	(Uruguay) Ariel Behar	(Italy) Simone Bolelli (Italy) Alessandro Giannessi	6–2, 7–6^{(9–7)}
Loss	19–15	Jun 2018	Vicenza, Italy	Challenger	Clay	(Brazil) Fabrício Neis	(Uruguay) Ariel Behar (Spain) Enrique López Pérez	2–6, 4–6
Loss	19–16	Nov 2018	Montevideo, Uruguay	Challenger	Clay	(Argentina) Andrés Molteni	(Argentina) Guido Andreozzi (Argentina) Guillermo Durán	6–7^{(5–7)}, 4–6
Win	20–16	Nov 2019	Montevideo, Uruguay	Challenger	Clay	(Argentina) Andrés Molteni	(Brazil) Orlando Luz (Brazil) Rafael Matos	6–4, 5–7, [12–10]
Win	21–16	Jul 2021	Salzburg, Austria	Challenger	Clay	(Peru) Sergio Galdós	(United States) Robert Galloway (United States) Alex Lawson	6–0, 6–3
Win	22–16	Nov 2026	Villa María, Argentina	Challenger	Clay	(Argentina) Gonzalo Villanueva	(Netherlands) Ryan Nijboer (Spain) Oriol Roca Batalla	walkover
Win	23–16	Nov 2026	Lima, Peru	Challenger	Clay	(Argentina) Facundo Mena	(Poland) Karol Drzewiecki (Poland) Piotr Matuszewski	4–6, 6–4, [10–3]

== Singles performance timeline ==
Key
W	F	SF	QF	#R	RR	Q#	P#	DNQ	A	Z#	PO	G	S	B	NMS	NTI	P	NH

(W) winner; (F) finalist; (SF) semifinalist; (QF) quarterfinalist; (#R) rounds 4, 3, 2, 1; (RR) round-robin stage; (Q#) qualification round; (P#) preliminary round; (DNQ) did not qualify; (A) absent; (Z#) Davis/Fed Cup Zonal Group (with number indication) or (PO) play-off; (G) gold, (S) silver or (B) bronze Olympic/Paralympic medal; (NMS) not a Masters tournament; (NTI) not a Tier I tournament; (P) postponed; (NH) not held; (SR) strike rate (events won / competed); (W–L) win–loss record.
To avoid confusion and double counting, these charts are updated at the conclusion of a tournament or when the player's participation has ended.

Current through the 2025 US Open qualifying.

Tournament	2010	2011	2012	2013	2014	2015	2016	2017	2018	2019	2020	2021	2022	2023	2024	2025	SR	W–L	Win%
Grand Slam tournaments
Australian Open	A	A	Q1	A	A	A	A	1R	Q1	Q1	Q2	Q1	1R	1R	Q1	A	0 / 3	0–3	0%
French Open	A	Q2	Q1	Q1	2R	Q2	2R	Q1	Q2	Q1	Q2	2R	1R	Q3	Q3	Q1	0 / 4	3–4	43%
Wimbledon	A	Q1	A	A	A	1R	1R	1R	Q1	Q1	NH	1R	1R	A	Q1	Q1	0 / 5	0–5	0%
US Open	Q1	Q1	Q2	Q2	1R	Q3	1R	Q2	1R	Q2	A	3R	1R	Q2	Q1	Q1	0 / 5	2–5	29%
Win–loss	0–0	0–0	0–0	0–0	1–2	0–1	1–3	0–2	0–1	0–0	0–0	3–3	0–4	0–1	0–0	0–0	0 / 17	5–17	23%
Career statistics
Tournament	2010	2011	2012	2013	2014	2015	2016	2017	2018	2019	2020	2021	2022	2023	2024	2025	SR	W–L	Win%
Tournaments	0	2	2	0	3	4	11	12	4	5	4	12	15	10	3	1	88		
Overall win–loss	0–0	0–2	1–2	0–0	2–3	2–4	6–11	3–12	2–4	2–5	1–4	11–12	7–15	2–10	5–3	0–1	0 / 88	44–88	33%
Win %	N/A	0%	33%	N/A	40%	33%	35%	20%	33%	29%	20%	48%	32%	17%	63%	0%	33.33%		
Year-end ranking	242	157	237	123	125	140	56	181	153	137	125	76	93	242	144	394	$3,263,172		

== Notes ==
References
