= 2016 Santiago Challenger – Doubles =

Doubles
- 2016 Santiago Challenger

Final
- Champions: (Chile) Julio Peralta; (Argentina) Horacio Zeballos
- Runners-up: (Peru) Sergio Galdós; (Argentina) Máximo González
- Score: 6–3, 6–4

Events
Singles	Doubles
← 2015 ·	Santiago Challenger	· 2017 →

Guillermo Durán and Máximo González were the defending champions at the doubles at the 2016 Santiago Challenger tennis tournament, but only González chose to defend his title, with partner Sergio Galdós. González lost in the final to Julio Peralta and Horacio Zeballos.

Peralta and Zeballos won the title after defeating Galdós and González 6–3, 6–4 in the final.

== Seeds ==
1. (Chile) Julio Peralta / (Argentina) Horacio Zeballos (champions)
2. (Peru) Sergio Galdós / (Argentina) Máximo González (final)
3. (Chile) Nicolás Jarry / (Brazil) Fabrício Neis (semifinals)
4. (Uruguay) Ariel Behar / (Brazil) Fabiano de Paula (first round)

== Draw ==
Key

- Q = Qualifier
- WC = Wild card
- LL = Lucky loser
- Alt = Alternate
- ITF = ITF entry
- PR = Protected ranking
- SR = Special ranking
- SE = Special exempt
- JE = Junior exempt
- JR = Junior Accelerator Programme entrant
- CO = College Accelerator Programme entrant
- NG = Next Gen Accelerator Program entrant
- w/o = Walkover
- r = Retired
- d = Defaulted

First round

Quarterfinals

Semifinals

Final

1
- (Chile) J Peralta
- (Argentina) H Zeballos
w/o

- (Brazil) D Dutra da Silva
- (Brazil) R Dutra Silva

1
- (Chile) J Peralta
- (Argentina) H Zeballos
6
6

- (Austria) M Linzer
- (Argentina) T Lipovšek Puches
6
6^{6}
[10]

- (Austria) M Linzer
- (Argentina) T Lipovšek Puches
3
3

WC
- (Chile) Carlos Cuevas
- (Argentina) JP Paz
3
7^{8}
[4]

1
- (Chile) J Peralta
- (Argentina) H Zeballos
4
7
[10]

3
- (Chile) N Jarry
- (Brazil) F Neis
w/o

3
- (Chile) N Jarry
- (Brazil) F Neis
6
5
[7]

- (Brazil) T Monteiro
- (Brazil) P Sakamoto

3
- (Chile) N Jarry
- (Brazil) F Neis
6
6

WC
- (Chile) C Saavedra
- (Chile) R Urzúa Rivera
4
4

- (Dominican Republic) J Hernández
- (Portugal) P Sousa
0
2

- (Dominican Republic) J Hernández
- (Portugal) P Sousa
6
6

1
- (Chile) J Peralta
- (Argentina) H Zeballos
6
6

- (Chile) Bastián Malla
- (Norway) C Ruud
6^{5}
5

2
- (Peru) S Galdós
- (Argentina) M González
3
4

WC
(Chile) MT Barrios Vera
(Chile) Jorge Montero
7^{7}
7

WC
(Chile) MT Barrios Vera
(Chile) J Montero
6^{5}
7
[7]

- (Chile) C Garín
- (Spain) J Munar
6
1
[10]

- (Chile) C Garín
- (Spain) J Munar
7^{7}
5
[10]

4
- (Uruguay) A Behar
- (Brazil) F de Paula
3
6
[6]

- (Chile) C Garín
- (Spain) J Munar
6^{5}
4

(Brazil) A Ghem
(Brazil) E Russi Assumpção
6
6

2
- (Peru) S Galdós
- (Argentina) M González
7^{7}
6

- (Argentina) Maximiliano Estévez
- (Argentina) JI Londero
2
4

(Brazil) A Ghem
(Brazil) E Russi Assumpção
4
3

- (Brazil) P Bernardi
- (Argentina) A Velotti
3
1

2
- (Peru) S Galdós
- (Argentina) M González
6
6

2
- (Peru) S Galdós
- (Argentina) M González
6
6
