= 2009 Challenger ATP Iquique =

- Date: January 19 – January 25
- Edition: 1st
- Location: Iquique, Chile

Champions

Singles
- (Argentina) Máximo González

Doubles
- (Sweden) Johan Brunström / (Netherlands Antilles) Jean-Julien Rojer
- Challenger ATP Iquique

The 2009 Challenger ATP Iquique was a professional tennis tournament played on outdoor clay courts. It was part of the 2009 ATP Challenger Tour. It took place in Iquique, Chile between 19 and 25 January 2009.

== Singles main-draw entrants ==
=== Seeds ===
Country	Player	Rank^{1}	Seed
ARG	Máximo González	127	1
URU	Pablo Cuevas	142	2
ARG	Diego Hartfield	167	3
BRA	Ricardo Hocevar	168	4
SRB	Boris Pašanski	172	5
ARG	Juan Pablo Brzezicki	176	6
ARG	Sebastián Decoud	177	7
ARG	Horacio Zeballos	180	8

- Rankings are as of January 12, 2009.

=== Other entrants ===
The following players received wildcards into the singles main draw:

- (Chile) Adrián García
- (Argentina) Gastón Gaudio
- (Chile) Victor Morales
- (Argentina) Mariano Zabaleta

The following players received entry from the qualifying draw:

- (Chile) Jorge Aguilar
- (Italy) Enrico Burzi
- (Chile) Guillermo Hormazábal
- (Poland) Grzegorz Panfil

== Champions ==
=== Singles ===
- (Argentina) Máximo González def. (Chile) Guillermo Hormazábal, 6–4, 6–4

=== Doubles ===
- (Sweden) Johan Brunström / (Netherlands Antilles) Jean-Julien Rojer def. (Uruguay) Pablo Cuevas / (Argentina) Horacio Zeballos, 6–3, 6–4
