= 2016 Santiago Challenger =

- Date: 17 – 22 October
- Edition: 2nd
- Surface: Clay
- Location: Santiago, Chile

Champions

Singles
- (Argentina) Máximo González

Doubles
- (Chile) Julio Peralta / (Argentina) Horacio Zeballos
← 2015 ·	Santiago Challenger	· 2017 →

The 2016 Santiago Challenger was a professional tennis tournament played on clay courts. It was the second edition of the tournament which was part of the 2016 ATP Challenger Tour. It took place in Santiago, Chile between 17 and 22 October 2016.

== Singles main-draw entrants ==
=== Seeds ===
Country	Player	Rank^{1}	Seed
ARG	Horacio Zeballos	73	1
BRA	Thiago Monteiro	88	2
ARG	~~Renzo Olivo~~	~~105~~	~~3~~
BRA	Rogério Dutra Silva	107	4
BRA	João Souza	118	5
ARG	Guido Andreozzi	126	6
ARG	Leonardo Mayer	127	7
ARG	Nicolás Kicker	132	8

- ^{1} Rankings are as of October 10, 2016.

=== Other entrants ===
The following players received wildcards into the singles main draw:

- (Chile) Nicolás Jarry
- (Spain) Jaume Munar
- (Chile) Bastián Malla
- (Chile) Marcelo Tomás Barrios Vera

The following player received entry into the singles main draw using a protected ranking:

- (Brazil) Fabiano de Paula

The following player entered as an alternate:

- (Austria) Michael Linzer

The following players received entry from the qualifying draw:

- (Argentina) Andrea Collarini
- (Brazil) Daniel Dutra da Silva
- (Argentina) Juan Pablo Ficovich
- (Argentina) Juan Pablo Paz

The following players entered as lucky losers:

- (Argentina) Facundo Mena
- (Brazil) João Pedro Sorgi

== Champions ==
=== Singles ===
- (Argentina) Máximo González def. (Brazil) Rogério Dutra Silva, 6–2, 7–6^{(7–5)}.

=== Doubles ===
- (Chile) Julio Peralta / (Argentina) Horacio Zeballos def. (Peru) Sergio Galdós / (Argentina) Máximo González, 6–3, 6–4.
