= 2009 Challenger ATP Iquique – Doubles =

Doubles
- 2009 Challenger ATP Iquique

Final
- Champions: (Netherlands Antilles) Jean-Julien Rojer (Sweden) Johan Brunström
- Runners-up: (Uruguay) Pablo Cuevas (Argentina) Horacio Zeballos
- Score: 6–3, 6–4

Events
Singles	Doubles
← 2008 ·	Challenger ATP Iquique	· 2010 →

Jean-Julien Rojer and Johan Brunström won in the final 6–3, 6–4, against Pablo Cuevas and Horacio Zeballos.

== Seeds ==
1. (Netherlands Antilles) Jean-Julien Rojer / (Sweden) Johan Brunström (champions)
2. (Uruguay) Pablo Cuevas / (Argentina) Horacio Zeballos (final)
3. (Argentina) Carlos Berlocq / (Argentina) Sebastián Decoud (quarterfinals, withdrew)
4. (Brazil) Rogério Dutra da Silva / (Brazil) Márcio Torres (first round)

== Draw ==
=== Key ===
- Q = Qualifier
- WC = Wild card
- LL = Lucky loser
- Alt = Alternate
- SE = Special exempt
- PR = Protected ranking
- ITF = ITF entry
- JE = Junior exempt
- w/o = Walkover
- r = Retired
- d = Defaulted
- SR = Special ranking

=== Draw ===
First round
1	(Netherlands Antilles) J-J Rojer (Sweden) J Brunström	6	6
(Italy) Enrico Burzi (Italy) A di Mauro	4	3
(Argentina) JP Brzezicki (Peru) I Miranda	6	6
WC	(Chile) A García (Chile) R Urzua-Rivera	3	3
3	(Argentina) C Berlocq (Argentina) S Decoud	6	6
(Brazil) A Miele (Republic of Ireland) C Niland	4	1
(Brazil) D Silva (Brazil) C Zampieri	7	6
(Chile) J Aguilar (Chile) R Perez	5	1
(Brazil) R Hocevar (Brazil) J Souza	7	6
(Argentina) Juan-Pablo Amado (Serbia) B Pašanski	6^{4}	3
WC	(Chile) G Hormazábal (Chile) H Podlipnik-Castillo	6	3	[10]
4	(Brazil) R Dutra da Silva (Brazil) M Torres	3	6	[3]
(Dominican Republic) V Estrella (Uruguay) M Felder	7	6
(Argentina) D Álvarez (Spain) C Poch-Gradin	6^{5}	2
(Argentina) M González (Argentina) M Puerta	6	6
2	(Uruguay) P Cuevas (Argentina) H Zeballos	4	1

Quarterfinals
1	(Netherlands Antilles) J-J Rojer (Sweden) J Brunström	6	6
(Argentina) JP Brzezicki (Peru) I Miranda	3	2
3	(Argentina) C Berlocq (Argentina) S Decoud	w/o
(Brazil) D Silva (Brazil) C Zampieri
(Brazil) R Hocevar (Brazil) J Souza	7	6
WC	(Chile) G Hormazábal (Chile) H Podlipnik-Castillo	6^{4}	4
(Dominican Republic) V Estrella (Uruguay) M Felder	6	3	[5]
2	(Uruguay) P Cuevas (Argentina) H Zeballos	3	6	[10]

Semifinals
1	(Netherlands Antilles) J-J Rojer (Sweden) J Brunström	6^{5}	6	[10]
(Brazil) D Silva (Brazil) C Zampieri	7	3	[8]
(Brazil) R Hocevar (Brazil) J Souza	6	6^{10}	[8]
2	(Uruguay) P Cuevas (Argentina) H Zeballos	4	7	[10]

Finals
1	(Netherlands Antilles) J-J Rojer (Sweden) J Brunström	6	6
2	(Uruguay) P Cuevas (Argentina) H Zeballos	3	4
