= 2017 Santiago Challenger – Singles =

Singles
- 2017 Santiago Challenger

Final
- Champion: (Chile) Nicolás Jarry
- Runner-up: (El Salvador) Marcelo Arévalo
- Score: 6–1, 7–5

Events
Singles	Doubles
- Santiago Challenger

Máximo González was the defending champion but lost in the first round to Facundo Bagnis.

Nicolás Jarry won the title after defeating Marcelo Arévalo 6–1, 7–5 in the final.

== Seeds ==
1. (Brazil) Rogério Dutra Silva (semifinals)
2. (Chile) Nicolás Jarry (champion)
3. (Argentina) Carlos Berlocq (quarterfinals)
4. (Portugal) Gastão Elias (quarterfinals)
5. (Brazil) Thiago Monteiro (semifinals)
6. (Argentina) Facundo Bagnis (second round)
7. (Hungary) Attila Balázs (first round)
8. (El Salvador) Marcelo Arévalo (final)

== Draw ==
Key

- Q = Qualifier
- WC = Wild card
- LL = Lucky loser
- Alt = Alternate
- ITF = ITF entry
- PR = Protected ranking
- SR = Special ranking
- SE = Special exempt
- JE = Junior exempt
- JR = Junior Accelerator Programme entrant
- CO = College Accelerator Programme entrant
- NG = Next Gen Accelerator Program entrant
- w/o = Walkover
- r = Retired
- d = Defaulted

=== Finals ===
Semifinals
1	(Brazil) Rogério Dutra Silva	3	2
8	(El Salvador) Marcelo Arévalo	6	6
5	(Brazil) Thiago Monteiro	2	2
2	(Chile) Nicolás Jarry	6	6

Final
8	(El Salvador) Marcelo Arévalo	1	5
2	(Chile) Nicolás Jarry	6	7

=== Top half ===
First round
1	(Brazil) R Dutra Silva	6	6
(Argentina) JP Ficovich	3	4
Q	(Brazil) P Sakamoto	1	2
(Argentina) JI Londero	6	6
Q	(Argentina) Patricio Heras	7^{7}	6
WC	(Chile) JC Sáez	6^{3}	4
(Argentina) M González	6^{5}	0
6	(Argentina) F Bagnis	7^{7}	6
4	(Portugal) G Elias	7^{7}	6
(Spain) J Munar	6^{5}	0
(Argentina) A Collarini	3	1
(Argentina) P Cachin	6	6
(Slovenia) B Rola	4	6^{5}
(Portugal) G Oliveira	6	7^{7}
(Argentina) F Argüello	2	1
8	(El Salvador) M Arévalo	6	6

Second round
1	(Brazil) R Dutra Silva	6	2	6
(Argentina) JI Londero	3	6	2
Q	(Argentina) P Heras	6	5	6
6	(Argentina) F Bagnis	4	7	3
4	(Portugal) G Elias	6^{7}	6	7
(Argentina) P Cachin	7^{9}	4	5
(Portugal) G Oliveira	4	6	5
8	(El Salvador) M Arévalo	6	4	7

Quarterfinals
1	(Brazil) R Dutra Silva	6	6
Q	(Argentina) P Heras	4	4
4	(Portugal) G Elias	6^{4}	6	4
8	(El Salvador) M Arévalo	7^{7}	3	6

Semifinals
1	(Brazil) R Dutra Silva	3	2
8	(El Salvador) M Arévalo	6	6

=== Bottom half ===
First round
5	(Brazil) T Monteiro	5	6	6
(Spain) J Martí	7	4	3
Q	(Spain) R Carballés Baena	6	7
(Brazil) J Souza	4	5
WC	(Dominican Republic) J Hernández-Fernández	6	6
WC	(Chile) Javier Naser	1	1
Q	(Bulgaria) D Kuzmanov	3	0
3	(Argentina) C Berlocq	6	6
7	(Hungary) A Balázs	4	2
(Brazil) JP Sorgi	6	6
(Colombia) DE Galán	0	6	2
(Austria) M Linzer	6	2	0^{r}
(Brazil) G Clezar	4	6	3
WC	(Chile) G Lama	6	2	6
(Argentina) F Coria	4	4
2	(Chile) N Jarry	6	6

Second round
5	(Brazil) T Monteiro	5	7^{7}	6
Q	(Spain) R Carballés Baena	7	6^{2}	2
WC	(Dominican Republic) J Hernández-Fernández	1	4
3	(Argentina) C Berlocq	6	6
(Brazil) JP Sorgi	3	6	3
(Colombia) DE Galán	6	4	6
WC	(Chile) G Lama	6^{5}	2
2	(Chile) N Jarry	7^{7}	6

Quarterfinals
5	(Brazil) T Monteiro	6	0	6
3	(Argentina) C Berlocq	3	6	4
(Colombia) DE Galán	4	2
2	(Chile) N Jarry	6	6

Semifinals
5	(Brazil) T Monteiro	2	2
2	(Chile) N Jarry	6	6
