= 2015 Santiago Challenger – Singles =

Singles
- 2015 Santiago Challenger

Final
- Champion: (Brazil) Rogério Dutra Silva
- Runner-up: (Argentina) Horacio Zeballos
- Score: 7–5, 3–6, 7–5

Events
Singles	Doubles
- Santiago Challenger

This was the first edition of the tournament, Rogério Dutra Silva won the title defeating Horacio Zeballos in the final 7–5, 3–6, 7–5.

== Seeds ==
1. (Argentina) Diego Schwartzman (second round, retired)
2. (Colombia) Alejandro González (second round)
3. (Belgium) Kimmer Coppejans (second round)
4. (Brazil) João Souza (quarterfinals)
5. (Argentina) Carlos Berlocq (semifinals)
6. (Argentina) Facundo Bagnis (first round)
7. (Brazil) André Ghem (quarterfinals)
8. (Brazil) Rogério Dutra Silva (champion)

== Draw ==
Key

- Q = Qualifier
- WC = Wild card
- LL = Lucky loser
- Alt = Alternate
- ITF = ITF entry
- PR = Protected ranking
- SR = Special ranking
- SE = Special exempt
- JE = Junior exempt
- JR = Junior Accelerator Programme entrant
- CO = College Accelerator Programme entrant
- NG = Next Gen Accelerator Program entrant
- w/o = Walkover
- r = Retired
- d = Defaulted

=== Finals ===
Semifinals
(Argentina) Máximo González	3	6	3
8	(Brazil) Rogério Dutra Silva	6	0	6
5	(Argentina) Carlos Berlocq	5	6^{5}
(Argentina) Horacio Zeballos	7	7^{7}

Final
8	(Brazil) Rogério Dutra Silva	7	3	7
(Argentina) Horacio Zeballos	5	6	5

=== Top half ===
First round
1	(Argentina) D Schwartzman	3	6	7^{7}
(Spain) J Samper-Montaña	6	1	6^{3}
(Argentina) M González	6	6
WC	(Chile) Vicente Lagos	1	2
Q	(Italy) Francisco Bahamonde	6	6
(Slovakia) A Martin	1	3
(France) A Michon	6	4	1
7	(Brazil) A Ghem	3	6	6
4	(Brazil) J Souza	6	6
(Chile) C Garin	3	4
(Chile) JC Sáez	6	7
(Brazil) F Romboli	1	5
Q	(Ecuador) G Escobar	7^{8}	6^{5}	6
(Argentina) N Kicker	6^{6}	7^{7}	4
(Austria) M Linzer	2^{r}
8	(Brazil) R Dutra Silva	1

Second round
1	(Argentina) D Schwartzman	4	0^{r}
(Argentina) M González	6	1
Q	(Italy) F Bahamonde	4	2
7	(Brazil) A Ghem	6	6
4	(Brazil) J Souza	6	5	7^{7}
(Chile) JC Sáez	2	7	6^{5}
Q	(Ecuador) G Escobar	4	4
8	(Brazil) R Dutra Silva	6	6

Quarterfinals
(Argentina) M González	6	4	6
7	(Brazil) A Ghem	4	6	4
4	(Brazil) J Souza	6	3	6^{6}
8	(Brazil) R Dutra Silva	4	6	7^{8}

Semifinals
(Argentina) M González	3	6	3
8	(Brazil) R Dutra Silva	6	0	6

=== Bottom half ===
First round
5	(Argentina) C Berlocq	6	7^{7}
(Brazil) J Pereira	4	6^{3}
WC	(Chile) G Lama	6	6
(Sweden) C Lindell	3	4
(Chile) H Podlipnik	6	6
WC	(Chile) Bastian Malla	4	2
(Argentina) M Trungelliti	4	6^{4}
3	(Belgium) K Coppejans	6	7^{7}
6	(Argentina) F Bagnis	6^{10}	6	2
Q	(Brazil) T Monteiro	7^{12}	4	6
(Portugal) G Elias	6^{5}	6	6
WC	(Chile) MT Barrios Vera	7^{7}	4	1
(Argentina) H Zeballos	6^{5}	6	6
(Brazil) G Clezar	7^{7}	4	4
Q	(Brazil) Carlos Eduardo Severino	1	1
2	(Colombia) A González	6	6

Second round
5	(Argentina) C Berlocq	6	4	6
WC	(Chile) G Lama	1	6	3
(Chile) H Podlipnik	5	6	6
3	(Belgium) K Coppejans	7	3	2
Q	(Brazil) T Monteiro	6	3	2
(Portugal) G Elias	2	6	6
(Argentina) H Zeballos	7^{7}	6
2	(Colombia) A González	6^{1}	2

Quarterfinals
5	(Argentina) C Berlocq	6	6
(Chile) H Podlipnik	3	2
(Portugal) G Elias	6^{4}	6	6^{4}
(Argentina) H Zeballos	7^{7}	3	7^{7}

Semifinals
5	(Argentina) C Berlocq	5	6^{5}
(Argentina) H Zeballos	7	7^{7}
