= 2011 Cachantún Cup – Singles =

Singles
- 2011 Cachantún Cup

Final
- Champion: (Argentina) Máximo González
- Runner-up: (France) Éric Prodon
- Score: 7–5, 0–6, 6–2

Events
Singles	Doubles
← 2010 ·	Cachantún Cup	· 2012 →

Máximo González was the defending champion from the last edition of the tournament in 2009. He reached the final, where he defeated Éric Prodon 7–5, 0–6, 6–2.

== Seeds ==
1. (Argentina) Horacio Zeballos (semifinals)
2. (Argentina) Máximo González (champion)
3. (Brazil) João Souza (second round)
4. (France) Éric Prodon (final)
5. (Argentina) Diego Junqueira (quarterfinals, retired)
6. (Chile) Paul Capdeville (quarterfinals)
7. (Brazil) Rogério Dutra da Silva (quarterfinals)
8. (Croatia) Franko Škugor (quarterfinals)

== Draw ==
=== Key ===
- Q = Qualifier
- WC = Wild card
- LL = Lucky loser
- Alt = Alternate
- SE = Special exempt
- PR = Protected ranking
- ITF = ITF entry
- JE = Junior exempt
- w/o = Walkover
- r = Retired
- d = Defaulted
- SR = Special ranking

=== Finals ===
Semifinals
1	(Argentina) Horacio Zeballos	0	1
4	(France) Éric Prodon	6	6
(Italy) Riccardo Ghedin	2	4
2	(Argentina) Máximo González	6	6

Final
4	(France) Éric Prodon	5	6	2
2	(Argentina) Máximo González	7	0	6

=== Top half ===
First round
1	(Argentina) H Zeballos	3	6	7
(Argentina) JP Brzezicki	6	3	6^{6}
WC	(Chile) C Saavedra-Corvalán	6	6
(Colombia) C Salamanca	2	4
WC	(Chile) Jorge Montero	1	3
(Chile) J Aguilar	6	6
(Argentina) F Bagnis	4	6^{2}
6	(Chile) P Capdeville	6	7
4	(France) É Prodon	7	7
(Brazil) R Hocevar	5	6^{0}
Q	(Chile) G Hormazábal	3	5
WC	(Chile) G Rivera-Aránguiz	6	7
Q	(Brazil) J Pereira	3	2
(Italy) M Trevisan	6	6
(Chile) N Massú	3	0	r
7	(Brazil) R Dutra da Silva	6	2

Second round
1	(Argentina) H Zeballos	6	6
WC	(Chile) C Saavedra-Corvalán	4	1
(Chile) J Aguilar	5	3
6	(Chile) P Capdeville	7	6
4	(France) É Prodon	6	6
WC	(Chile) G Rivera-Aránguiz	3	1
(Italy) M Trevisan	4	2
7	(Brazil) R Dutra da Silva	6	6

Quarterfinals
1	(Argentina) H Zeballos	7	6
6	(Chile) P Capdeville	6^{3}	4
4	(France) É Prodon	7	6
7	(Brazil) R Dutra da Silva	5	4

Semifinals
1	(Argentina) H Zeballos	0	1
4	(France) É Prodon	6	6

=== Bottom half ===
First round
8	(Croatia) F Škugor	7	6
(Brazil) C Zampieri	6^{5}	3
Alt	(Argentina) P Galdón	6	6
(Brazil) Rafael Camilo	4	4
WC	(Chile) Juan Carlos Sáez	0	4
(Italy) R Ghedin	6	6
PR	(Republic of Ireland) L Sorensen	3	6^{4}
3	(Brazil) J Souza	6	7
5	(Argentina) D Junqueira	6	6
Q	(Argentina) DS Schwartzman	3	4
(Brazil) J Silva	3	1
Q	(Italy) Stefano Travaglia	6	6
(Argentina) J Acasuso	7	7
(Ecuador) G Lapentti	5	6^{1}
(Argentina) A Molteni	2	4
2	(Argentina) M González	6	6

Second round
8	(Croatia) F Škugor	6	6
Alt	(Argentina) P Galdón	3	2
(Italy) R Ghedin	3	7	7
3	(Brazil) J Souza	6	6^{8}	6^{8}
5	(Argentina) D Junqueira	4	7	6
Q	(Italy) Stefano Travaglia	6	6^{8}	2
(Argentina) J Acasuso	6	5	3
2	(Argentina) M González	2	6	7

Quarterfinals
8	(Croatia) F Škugor	2	3
(Italy) R Ghedin	6	6
5	(Argentina) D Junqueira	6^{7}	r
2	(Argentina) M González	7

Semifinals
(Italy) R Ghedin	2	4
2	(Argentina) M González	6	6
