= 2011 Cachantún Cup – Doubles =

Doubles
- 2011 Cachantún Cup

Final
- Champions: (Argentina) Máximo González (Argentina) Horacio Zeballos
- Runners-up: (Chile) Guillermo Rivera Aránguiz (Chile) Cristóbal Saavedra Corvalán
- Score: 6–3, 6–4

Events
Singles	Doubles
← 2010 ·	Cachantún Cup	· 2012 →

Sebastián Prieto and Horacio Zeballos were the defending champions from the last edition of the tournament in 2009, but only Zeballos chose to defend his title.
He played alongside Máximo González. They won the title, defeating Guillermo Rivera Aránguiz and Cristóbal Saavedra Corvalán 6–3, 6–4 in the final.

== Seeds ==
1. (Argentina) Máximo González / (Argentina) Horacio Zeballos (champions)
2. (Brazil) Rogério Dutra da Silva / (Brazil) João Souza (withdrew)
3. (Brazil) Júlio Silva / (Brazil) Caio Zampieri (withdrew)
4. (Argentina) Diego Junqueira / (Argentina) Martín Vassallo Argüello (quarterfinals)

== Draw ==
=== Key ===
- Q = Qualifier
- WC = Wild card
- LL = Lucky loser
- Alt = Alternate
- ITF = ITF entry
- PR = Protected ranking
- SR = Special ranking
- SE = Special exempt
- JE = Junior exempt
- JR = Junior Accelerator Programme entrant
- CO = College Accelerator Programme entrant
- NG = Next Gen Accelerator Program entrant
- w/o = Walkover
- r = Retired
- d = Defaulted

=== Draw ===
First round
1	(Argentina) M González (Argentina) H Zeballos	7	3	[10]
(Argentina) F Bagnis (Argentina) A Molteni	5	6	[7]
(Chile) J Aguilar (Argentina) P Galdón	6	6
(Brazil) Rafael Camilo (Brazil) M Demoliner	3	2
Alt	(Italy) Stefano Travaglia (Italy) M Trevisan	6	4	[7]
(Italy) R Ghedin (Argentina) DS Schwartzman	3	6	[10]
(Brazil) J Pereira (Croatia) F Škugor	2	6	[10]
(Argentina) M Alund (Argentina) Guillermo Durán	6	4	[4]
WC	(Chile) Juan Carlos Sáez (Chile) Ricardo Urzua-Rivera	6	6
(Ecuador) G Lapentti (Colombia) C Salamanca	4	2
WC	(Chile) G Hormazábal (Chile) Jorge Montero	3	2
4	(Argentina) D Junqueira (Argentina) M Vassallo Argüello	6	6
WC	(Chile) G Rivera-Aránguiz (Chile) C Saavedra-Corvalán	7	6
(France) Thomas Cazes-Carrère (France) É Prodon	6^{5}	1
(Brazil) R Hocevar (Brazil) Tiago Lopes
2	(Brazil) R Dutra da Silva (Brazil) J Souza	w/o

Quarterfinals
1	(Argentina) M González (Argentina) H Zeballos	6	6^{2}	[10]
(Chile) J Aguilar (Argentina) P Galdón	4	7	[7]
(Italy) R Ghedin (Argentina) DS Schwartzman	6^{1}	6	[10]
(Brazil) J Pereira (Croatia) F Škugor	7	4	[5]
WC	(Chile) Juan Carlos Sáez (Chile) Ricardo Urzua-Rivera	6	6
4	(Argentina) D Junqueira (Argentina) M Vassallo Argüello	4	4
WC	(Chile) G Rivera-Aránguiz (Chile) C Saavedra-Corvalán	7	6
(Brazil) R Hocevar (Brazil) Tiago Lopes	6^{4}	2

Semifinals
1	(Argentina) M González (Argentina) H Zeballos	6	7
(Italy) R Ghedin (Argentina) DS Schwartzman	2	6^{2}
WC	(Chile) Juan Carlos Sáez (Chile) Ricardo Urzua-Rivera	3	6	[5]
WC	(Chile) G Rivera-Aránguiz (Chile) C Saavedra-Corvalán	6	3	[10]

Final
1	(Argentina) M González (Argentina) H Zeballos	6	6
WC	(Chile) G Rivera-Aránguiz (Chile) C Saavedra-Corvalán	3	4
