= 2017 Santiago Challenger =

- Date: 13–18 November
- Edition: 3rd
- Surface: Clay
- Location: Santiago, Chile

Champions

Singles
- (Chile) Nicolás Jarry

Doubles
- (Argentina) Franco Agamenone / (Argentina) Facundo Argüello
← 2016 ·	Santiago Challenger	· 2018 →

The 2017 Santiago Challenger was a professional tennis tournament played on clay courts. It was the third edition of the tournament which was part of the 2017 ATP Challenger Tour. It took place in Santiago, Chile between 13 and 18 November 2017.

== Singles main-draw entrants ==
=== Seeds ===
Country	Player	Rank^{1}	Seed
BRA	Rogério Dutra Silva	93	1
CHI	Nicolás Jarry	118	2
ARG	Carlos Berlocq	120	3
POR	Gastão Elias	121	4
BRA	Thiago Monteiro	133	5
ARG	Facundo Bagnis	150	6
HUN	Attila Balázs	166	7
ESA	Marcelo Arévalo	209	8

- ^{1} Rankings are as of 6 November 2017.

=== Other entrants ===
The following players received wildcards into the singles main draw:

- (Dominican Republic) José Hernández-Fernández
- (Chile) Gonzalo Lama
- (Chile) Javier Naser
- (Chile) Juan Carlos Sáez

The following players received entry from the qualifying draw:

- (Spain) Roberto Carballés Baena
- (Argentina) Patricio Heras
- (Bulgaria) Dimitar Kuzmanov
- (Brazil) Pedro Sakamoto

== Champions ==
=== Singles ===
- (Chile) Nicolás Jarry def. (El Salvador) Marcelo Arévalo 6–1, 7–5.

=== Doubles ===
- (Argentina) Franco Agamenone / (Argentina) Facundo Argüello def. (Argentina) Máximo González / (Chile) Nicolás Jarry 6–4, 3–6, [10–6].
