= 2009 Challenger ATP Iquique – Singles =

Singles
- 2009 Challenger ATP Iquique

Final
- Champion: (Argentina) Máximo González
- Runner-up: (Chile) Guillermo Hormazábal
- Score: 6–4, 6–4

Details
- Draw: 32 (4WC/4Q)
- Seeds: 8

Events
| Singles | Doubles |
- Challenger ATP Iquique

Máximo González won in the final 6–4, 6–4, against Guillermo Hormazábal.

== Seeds ==
1. (Argentina) Máximo González (champion)
2. (Uruguay) Pablo Cuevas (second round)
3. (Argentina) Diego Hartfield (second round)
4. (Brazil) Ricardo Hocevar (semifinals)
5. (Serbia) Boris Pašanski (quarterfinals)
6. (Argentina) Juan Pablo Brzezicki (semifinals)
7. (Argentina) Sebastián Decoud (first round)
8. (Argentina) Horacio Zeballos (quarterfinals)

== Draw ==
Key

- Q = Qualifier
- WC = Wild card
- LL = Lucky loser
- Alt = Alternate
- ITF = ITF entry
- PR = Protected ranking
- SR = Special ranking
- SE = Special exempt
- JE = Junior exempt
- JR = Junior Accelerator Programme entrant
- CO = College Accelerator Programme entrant
- NG = Next Gen Accelerator Program entrant
- w/o = Walkover
- r = Retired
- d = Defaulted

=== Final four ===
Semifinals
1 | (Argentina) Máximo González | 5 | 7 | 6
6 | (Argentina) Juan Pablo Brzezicki | 7 | 6^{5} | 4
4 | (Brazil) Ricardo Hocevar | 2 | 6 | 5
Q | (Chile) Guillermo Hormazábal | 6 | 4 | 7

Final
1 | (Argentina) Máximo González | 6 | 6
Q | (Chile) Guillermo Hormazábal | 4 | 4

=== Top half ===
First round
1 | (Argentina) M González | 3 | 7 | 6
Q | (Poland) G Panfil | 6 | 5 | 2
(Argentina) C Berlocq | 6 | 6
(Peru) I Miranda | 0 | 3
(Argentina) M Puerta | 3 | 4
(Spain) C Poch-Gradin | 6 | 6
(Brazil) D Silva | 6 | 2 | 1
8 | (Argentina) H Zeballos | 2 | 6 | 6
3 | (Argentina) D Hartfield | 6 | 6
WC | (Chile) Victor Morales | 4 | 3
WC | (Argentina) G Gaudio | 6 | 4 | 6
(Italy) A di Mauro | 0 | 6 | 2
(Brazil) C Zampieri | 3 | 5
(Republic of Ireland) C Niland | 6 | 7
(Dominican Republic) V Estrella | 6 | 3 | 5
6 | (Argentina) JP Brzezicki | 4 | 6 | 7

Second round
1 | (Argentina) M González | 6 | 4 | 3
(Argentina) C Berlocq | 4 | 6 | 4^{r}
(Spain) C Poch-Gradin | 2 | 3
8 | (Argentina) H Zeballos | 6 | 6
3 | (Argentina) D Hartfield | 1 | 6 | 5
WC | (Argentina) G Gaudio | 6 | 2 | 7
(Republic of Ireland) C Niland | 4 | 6 | 4
6 | (Argentina) JP Brzezicki | 6 | 4 | 6

Quarterfinals
1 | (Argentina) M González | 6 | 6
8 | (Argentina) H Zeballos | 2 | 4
WC | (Argentina) G Gaudio | w/o
6 | (Argentina) JP Brzezicki

Semifinals
1 | (Argentina) M González | 5 | 7 | 6
6 | (Argentina) J Brzezicki | 7 | 6^{5} | 4

=== Bottom half ===
First round
5 | (Serbia) B Pašanski | 6 | 3 | 6
Q | (Italy) Enrico Burzi | 3 | 6 | 3
WC | (Argentina) M Zabaleta | 7 | 6
(Brazil) R Dutra da Silva | 6^{5} | 3
(Argentina) D Álvarez | 6 | 7
Q | (Serbia) F Krajinović | 2 | 6^{4}
(Uruguay) M Felder | 6^{5} | 3
4 | (Brazil) R Hocevar | 7 | 6
7 | (Argentina) S Decoud | 4 | 6 | 3
(Argentina) Juan Pablo Amado | 6 | 3 | 6
Q | (Chile) J Aguilar | 6^{6} | 3
Q | (Chile) G Hormazábal | 7 | 6
(Brazil) A Miele | 6 | 6
(Brazil) J Souza | 4 | 4
WC | (Chile) A García | 7 | 5 | 4
2 | (Uruguay) P Cuevas | 6^{3} | 7 | 6

Second round
5 | (Serbia) B Pašanski | 6 | 1 | 6
WC | (Argentina) M Zabaleta | 3 | 6 | 3
(Argentina) D Álvarez | 3 | 6^{3}
4 | (Brazil) R Hocevar | 6 | 7
(Argentina) JP Amado | 1 | 1
Q | (Chile) G Hormazábal | 6 | 6
(Brazil) J Souza | 3 | 7 | 7
2 | (Uruguay) P Cuevas | 6 | 6^{4} | 5

Quarterfinals
5 | (Serbia) B Pašanski | 7 | 6^{4} | 6^{5}
4 | (Brazil) R Hocevar | 6^{5} | 7 | 7
Q | (Chile) G Hormazábal | 7 | 7
(Brazil) J Souza | 5 | 6^{3}

Semifinals
4 | (Brazil) R Hocevar | 2 | 6 | 5
Q | (Chile) G Hormazábal | 6 | 4 | 7
