= 2016 Santiago Challenger – Singles =

Singles
- 2016 Santiago Challenger

Final
- Champion: (Argentina) Máximo González
- Runner-up: (Brazil) Rogério Dutra Silva
- Score: 6–2, 7–6^{(7–5)}

Events
Singles	Doubles
- Santiago Challenger

Rogério Dutra Silva was the defending champion but lost in the final to Máximo González.

González won the title after defeating Dutra Silva 6–2, 7–6^{(7–5)} in the final.

== Seeds ==
1. (Argentina) Horacio Zeballos (semifinals)
2. (Brazil) Thiago Monteiro (semifinals, retired)
3. (Argentina) Renzo Olivo (withdrew)
4. (Brazil) Rogério Dutra Silva (final)
5. (Brazil) João Souza (first round)
6. (Argentina) Guido Andreozzi (second round)
7. (Argentina) Leonardo Mayer (second round)
8. (Argentina) Nicolás Kicker (second round)

== Draw ==
Key

- Q = Qualifier
- WC = Wild card
- LL = Lucky loser
- Alt = Alternate
- ITF = ITF entry
- PR = Protected ranking
- SR = Special ranking
- SE = Special exempt
- JE = Junior exempt
- JR = Junior Accelerator Programme entrant
- CO = College Accelerator Programme entrant
- NG = Next Gen Accelerator Program entrant
- w/o = Walkover
- r = Retired
- d = Defaulted

=== Finals ===
Semifinals
1	(Argentina) Horacio Zeballos	1	7^{7}	6^{7}
(Argentina) Máximo González	6	6^{2}	7^{9}
4	(Brazil) Rogério Dutra Silva	5
2	(Brazil) Thiago Monteiro	0^{r}

Final
(Argentina) Máximo González	6	7^{7}
4	(Brazil) Rogério Dutra Silva	2	6^{5}

=== Top half ===
First round
1	(Argentina) H Zeballos	3	7^{9}	6
(Chile) C Garín	6	6^{7}	4
WC	(Chile) N Jarry	6^{5}	3
LL	(Brazil) JP Sorgi	7^{7}	6
(Argentina) T Lipovšek Puches	5	6	3
(Portugal) P Sousa	7	3	6
PR	(Brazil) F de Paula	2	1
6	(Argentina) G Andreozzi	6	6
LL	(Argentina) F Mena	6	0	3
Alt	(Austria) M Linzer	4	6	6
WC	(Spain) J Munar	2	2
(Norway) C Ruud	6	6
(Brazil) A Ghem	6	3	3
(Argentina) M González	2	6	6
WC	(Chile) MT Barrios Vera	4	4
7	(Argentina) L Mayer	6	6

Second round
1	(Argentina) H Zeballos	6	6
LL	(Brazil) JP Sorgi	3	4
(Portugal) P Sousa	7	7
6	(Argentina) G Andreozzi	5	5
Alt	(Austria) M Linzer	3	4
(Norway) C Ruud	6	6
(Argentina) M González	6	6
7	(Argentina) L Mayer	1	2

Quarterfinals
1	(Argentina) H Zeballos	7^{7}	6
(Portugal) P Sousa	6^{5}	4
(Norway) C Ruud	7	5	3
(Argentina) M González	5	7	6

Semifinals
1	(Argentina) H Zeballos	1	7^{7}	6^{7}
(Argentina) M González	6	6^{2}	7^{9}

=== Bottom half ===
First round
8	(Argentina) N Kicker	6	6
(Spain) J Samper Montaña	4	3
(France) M Bourgue	7	6
(Dominican Republic) J Hernández	5	1
WC	(Chile) Bastián Malla	4	5
(Argentina) Maximiliano Estévez	6	7
Q	(Argentina) A Collarini	6^{5}	6	2
4	(Brazil) R Dutra Silva	7^{7}	3	6
5	(Brazil) J Souza	2	4
(Argentina) A Velotti	6	6
Q	(Brazil) D Dutra da Silva	2	6	4
(France) A Michon	6	4	6
Q	(Argentina) JP Paz	6	6
Q	(Argentina) JP Ficovich	1	3
(Argentina) JI Londero	5	6^{7}
2	(Brazil) T Monteiro	7	7^{9}

Second round
8	(Argentina) N Kicker	6	2	2
(France) M Bourgue	2	6	6
(Argentina) M Estévez	6^{3}	6	4
4	(Brazil) R Dutra Silva	7^{7}	4	6
(Argentina) A Velotti	6	6^{2}	4
(France) A Michon	3	7^{7}	6
Q	(Argentina) JP Paz	4	2
2	(Brazil) T Monteiro	6	6

Quarterfinals
(France) M Bourgue	2	1
4	(Brazil) R Dutra Silva	6	6
(France) A Michon	5	4
2	(Brazil) T Monteiro	7	6

Semifinals
4	(Brazil) R Dutra Silva	5
2	(Brazil) T Monteiro	0^{r}
