= 2009 Challenger de Providencia – Singles =

Singles
- 2009 Challenger de Providencia

Final
- Champion: (Argentina) Máximo González
- Runner-up: (Argentina) Mariano Zabaleta
- Score: 6–4, 6–3

Events
Singles	Doubles
- Challenger de Providencia

Thomaz Bellucci was the defending champion; however, he did not take part in 2009 championships.
Máximo González won in the final 6–4, 6–3, against Mariano Zabaleta.

== Seeds ==
1. (Argentina) Leonardo Mayer (first round)
2. (Argentina) Máximo González (champion)
3. (Argentina) Sergio Roitman (quarterfinals)
4. (Argentina) Horacio Zeballos (first round)
5. (Brazil) Franco Ferreiro (semifinals)
6. (Brazil) Ricardo Hocevar (first round)
7. (Argentina) Sebastián Decoud (first round)
8. (Argentina) Mariano Puerta (first round)

== Draw ==
Key

- Q = Qualifier
- WC = Wild card
- LL = Lucky loser
- Alt = Alternate
- ITF = ITF entry
- PR = Protected ranking
- SR = Special ranking
- SE = Special exempt
- JE = Junior exempt
- JR = Junior Accelerator Programme entrant
- CO = College Accelerator Programme entrant
- NG = Next Gen Accelerator Program entrant
- w/o = Walkover
- r = Retired
- d = Defaulted

=== Final four ===
Semifinals
(Brazil) Caio Zampieri	4	4
(Argentina) Mariano Zabaleta	6	6
5	(Brazil) Franco Ferreiro	4	6	5
2	(Argentina) Máximo González	6	2	7

Final
(Argentina) Mariano Zabaleta	4	3
2	(Argentina) Máximo González	6	6

=== Top half ===
First round
1	(Argentina) L Mayer	6	5	6^{6}
Q	(Chile) J Aguilar	4	7	7
(Brazil) A Miele	2	4
(Argentina) JP Brzezicki	6	6
WC	(Chile) G Rivera-Aránguiz	6^{4}	6	4
Q	(Italy) Luigi D'Agord	6	1	6
(Brazil) C Zampieri	6	7
7	(Argentina) S Decoud	2	6^{5}
4	(Argentina) H Zeballos	4	4
(Argentina) M Zabaleta	6	6
LL	(Argentina) Gonzalo Tur	2	4
WC	(Argentina) G Gaudio	6	6
(Uruguay) M Felder	4	3
(Venezuela) J de Armas	6	6
(Brazil) J Silva	7	7
8	(Argentina) M Puerta	6^{5}	6^{4}

Second round
Q	(Chile) J Aguilar	7	6
(Argentina) JP Brzezicki	5	4
Q	(Italy) L D'Agord	7	2	2
(Brazil) C Zampieri	5	6	6
(Argentina) M Zabaleta	4	6	6
WC	(Argentina) G Gaudio	6	2	3
(Venezuela) J de Armas	3	4
(Brazil) J Silva	6	6

Quarterfinals
Q	(Chile) J Aguilar	6^{4}	4
(Brazil) C Zampieri	7	6
(Argentina) M Zabaleta	3	7	6
(Brazil) J Silva	6	6^{2}	4

Semifinals
(Brazil) C Zampieri	4	4
(Argentina) M Zabaleta	6	6

=== Bottom half ===
First round
5	(Brazil) F Ferreiro	7	6
Q	(Argentina) A Kon	5	0
Q	(Brazil) F Saretta	6	6
(Argentina) J-M Aranguren	3	3
(Argentina) Juan Pablo Amado	3	4
LL	(Argentina) A Fabbri	6	6
(Brazil) R Dutra da Silva	6^{7}	5
3	(Argentina) S Roitman	7	7
6	(Brazil) R Hocevar	6	3	4
WC	(Chile) G Hormazábal	2	6	6
(Argentina) D Álvarez	6	6
WC	(Chile) H Podlipnik-Castillo	3	4
(Brazil) J Souza	6	6
(Slovenia) L Gregorc	3	4
(Italy) R Ghedin	2	2
2	(Argentina) M González	6	6

Second round
5	(Brazil) F Ferreiro	6	6
Q	(Brazil) F Saretta	3	4
LL	(Argentina) A Fabbri	7	3	5
3	(Argentina) S Roitman	5	6	7
WC	(Chile) G Hormazábal	6^{3}	3
(Argentina) D Álvarez	7	6
(Brazil) J Souza	4	4
2	(Argentina) M González	6	6

Quarterfinals
5	(Brazil) F Ferreiro	6	6
3	(Argentina) S Roitman	2	2
(Argentina) D Álvarez	4	6^{4}
2	(Argentina) M González	6	7

Semifinals
5	(Brazil) F Ferreiro	4	6	5
2	(Argentina) M González	6	2	7
