= 2012 Cachantún Cup – Singles =

Singles
- 2012 Cachantún Cup

Final
- Champion: (Chile) Paul Capdeville
- Runner-up: (Croatia) Antonio Veić
- Score: 6–3, 6–7^{(5–7)}, 6–3

Events
Singles	Doubles
- Cachantún Cup

Máximo González was the defending champion but decided not to participate.
Paul Capdeville won the title, defeating Antonio Veić 6–3, 6–7^{(5–7)}, 6–3 in the final.

== Seeds ==
1. (France) Éric Prodon (second round)
2. (Brazil) Rogério Dutra da Silva (second round)
3. (Argentina) Diego Junqueira (first round)
4. (Argentina) Horacio Zeballos (second round)
5. (Slovenia) Blaž Kavčič (first round)
6. (Chile) Paul Capdeville (champion)
7. (Italy) Simone Bolelli (first round)
8. (Argentina) Facundo Bagnis (second round)

== Draw ==
Key

- Q = Qualifier
- WC = Wild card
- LL = Lucky loser
- Alt = Alternate
- ITF = ITF entry
- PR = Protected ranking
- SR = Special ranking
- SE = Special exempt
- JE = Junior exempt
- JR = Junior Accelerator Programme entrant
- CO = College Accelerator Programme entrant
- NG = Next Gen Accelerator Program entrant
- w/o = Walkover
- r = Retired
- d = Defaulted

=== Finals ===
Semifinals
Q	(Brazil) Fernando Romboli	6^{3}	3
(Croatia) Antonio Veić	7^{7}	6
(France) Guillaume Rufin	4	4
6	(Chile) Paul Capdeville	6	6

Final
(Croatia) Antonio Veić	3	7^{7}	3
6	(Chile) Paul Capdeville	6	6^{5}	6

=== Top half ===
First round
1	(France) É Prodon	7	6
(Brazil) G Clezar	5	4
Q	(Brazil) F Romboli	6	1	6
WC	(Chile) C Garin	0	6	1
(Colombia) A González	7^{7}	6
(Serbia) N Ćirić	6^{5}	4
Q	(Brazil) L Kirche	3	7^{7}	6
5	(Slovenia) B Kavčič	6	6^{5}	3
3	(Argentina) D Junqueira	3	3
WC	(Argentina) A Velotti	6	6
(Uruguay) M Felder	2	6^{8}
(Croatia) A Veić	6	7^{10}
(Argentina) JP Brzezicki	4	6	7^{7}
(Argentina) F Argüello	6	4	6^{4}
(Argentina) E Schwank	6	6
7	(Italy) S Bolelli	4	0

Second round
1	(France) É Prodon	2	5
Q	(Brazil) F Romboli	6	7
(Colombia) A González	3	3
Q	(Brazil) L Kirche	6	6
WC	(Argentina) A Velotti	1	3
(Croatia) A Veić	6	6
(Argentina) JP Brzezicki	3	5
(Argentina) E Schwank	6	7

Quarterfinals
Q	(Brazil) F Romboli	6	4	6
Q	(Brazil) L Kirche	4	6	3
(Croatia) A Veić	6	1
(Argentina) E Schwank	3	0^{r}

Semifinals
Q	(Brazil) F Romboli	6^{3}	3
(Croatia) A Veić	7^{7}	6

=== Bottom half ===
First round
8	(Argentina) F Bagnis	6	6
WC	(Chile) M Sborowitz	1	4
Q	(Argentina) M Estévez	5	4
(Argentina) M Alund	7	6
(France) G Rufin	5	6	6
(Spain) J Martí	7	4	3
(France) A Gensse	6^{4}	4
4	(Argentina) H Zeballos	7^{7}	6
6	(Chile) P Capdeville	6	5	6
Alt	(Argentina) S Decoud	3	7	4
(Argentina) A Molteni	6	6
(Argentina) P Galdón	0	2
Q	(Chile) C Saavedra-Corvalán	7^{7}	6^{4}	3
SE	(Argentina) G Pella	6^{4}	7^{7}	6
WC	(Chile) G Lama	4	2
2	(Brazil) R Dutra da Silva	6	6

Second round
8	(Argentina) F Bagnis	4	6	3
(Argentina) M Alund	6	2	6
(France) G Rufin	7	3	7^{7}
4	(Argentina) H Zeballos	5	6	6^{2}
6	(Chile) P Capdeville	6	6
(Argentina) A Molteni	3	4
SE	(Argentina) G Pella	4	6	6
2	(Brazil) R Dutra da Silva	6	4	4

Quarterfinals
(Argentina) M Alund	5	5
(France) G Rufin	7	7
6	(Chile) P Capdeville	6	7^{10}
SE	(Argentina) G Pella	3	6^{8}

Semifinals
(France) G Rufin	4	4
6	(Chile) P Capdeville	6	6
