= 2017 Santiago Challenger – Doubles =

Doubles
- 2017 Santiago Challenger

Final
- Champions: (Argentina) Franco Agamenone (Argentina) Facundo Argüello
- Runners-up: (Argentina) Máximo González (Chile) Nicolás Jarry
- Score: 6–4, 3–6, [10–6]

Events
Singles	Doubles
- Santiago Challenger

Julio Peralta and Horacio Zeballos were the defending champions but chose not to defend their title.

Franco Agamenone and Facundo Argüello won the title after defeating Máximo González and Nicolás Jarry 6–4, 3–6, [10–6] in the final.

== Seeds ==
1. (Peru) Sergio Galdós / (Argentina) Andrés Molteni (semifinals, withdrew)
2. (El Salvador) Marcelo Arévalo / (Mexico) Miguel Ángel Reyes-Varela (first round)
3. (Uruguay) Ariel Behar / (Brazil) Fabiano de Paula (first round)
4. (Argentina) Máximo González / (Chile) Nicolás Jarry (final)

== Draw ==
Key

- Q = Qualifier
- WC = Wild card
- LL = Lucky loser
- Alt = Alternate
- ITF = ITF entry
- PR = Protected ranking
- SR = Special ranking
- SE = Special exempt
- JE = Junior exempt
- JR = Junior Accelerator Programme entrant
- CO = College Accelerator Programme entrant
- NG = Next Gen Accelerator Program entrant
- w/o = Walkover
- r = Retired
- d = Defaulted

First round
1	(Peru) S Galdós (Argentina) A Molteni	7	7^{7}
(Monaco) R Arneodo (Brazil) F Romboli	5	6^{4}
(Colombia) DE Galán (Austria) M Linzer	1	2
(Spain) R Carballés Baena (Spain) J Munar	6	6
4	(Argentina) M González (Chile) N Jarry	6	3	[10]
(Argentina) P Cachin (Spain) J Martí	4	6	[6]
(Argentina) A Collarini (Argentina) F Coria	6	6
PR	(Colombia) A González (Argentina) JI Londero	3	2
(Brazil) G Clezar (Brazil) F Neis	6	6
WC	(Chile) Esteban Bruna (Chile) Víctor Núñez	2	3
(Bulgaria) D Kuzmanov (Portugal) G Oliveira	6	6
3	(Uruguay) A Behar (Brazil) F de Paula	2	4
WC	(Chile) Nicolás Acevedo (Chile) A Tabilo	4	7	[10]
WC	(Chile) Carlos Cuevas (Chile) JC Sáez	6	5	[7]
(Argentina) F Agamenone (Argentina) F Argüello	7^{7}	7
2	(El Salvador) M Arévalo (Mexico) MÁ Reyes-Varela	6^{4}	5

Quarterfinals
1	(Peru) S Galdós (Argentina) A Molteni	6	3	[10]
(Spain) R Carballés Baena (Spain) J Munar	3	6	[6]
4	(Argentina) M González (Chile) N Jarry	w/o
(Argentina) A Collarini (Argentina) F Coria
(Brazil) G Clezar (Brazil) F Neis	6	6
(Bulgaria) D Kuzmanov (Portugal) G Oliveira	1	3
WC	(Chile) N Acevedo (Chile) A Tabilo	1	5
(Argentina) F Agamenone (Argentina) F Argüello	6	7

Semifinals
1	(Peru) S Galdós (Argentina) A Molteni
4	(Argentina) M González (Chile) N Jarry	w/o
(Brazil) G Clezar (Brazil) F Neis	4	4
(Argentina) F Agamenone (Argentina) F Argüello	6	6

Final
4	(Argentina) M González (Chile) N Jarry	4	6	[6]
(Argentina) F Agamenone (Argentina) F Argüello	6	3	[10]
