= 2015 Santiago Challenger – Doubles =

Doubles
- 2015 Santiago Challenger

Final
- Champions: (Argentina) Guillermo Durán (Argentina) Máximo González
- Runners-up: (Slovakia) Andrej Martin (Chile) Hans Podlipnik
- Score: 7–6^{(8–6)}, 7–5

Events
Singles	Doubles
- Santiago Challenger

This was the first edition of the tournament, Guillermo Durán and Máximo González won the title beating Andrej Martin and Hans Podlipnik in the final 7–6^{(8–6)}, 7–5.

== Seeds ==
1. (Argentina) Guillermo Durán / (Argentina) Máximo González (champions)
2. (Slovakia) Andrej Martin / (Chile) Hans Podlipnik (final)
3. (Chile) Julio Peralta / (Argentina) Horacio Zeballos (first round)
4. (Argentina) Andrés Molteni / (Argentina) Marco Trungelliti (semifinals)

== Draw ==
Key

- Q = Qualifier
- WC = Wild card
- LL = Lucky loser
- Alt = Alternate
- ITF = ITF entry
- PR = Protected ranking
- SR = Special ranking
- SE = Special exempt
- JE = Junior exempt
- JR = Junior Accelerator Programme entrant
- CO = College Accelerator Programme entrant
- NG = Next Gen Accelerator Program entrant
- w/o = Walkover
- r = Retired
- d = Defaulted

First round
1	(Argentina) G Durán (Argentina) M González	6	6
WC	(Chile) Carlos Cuevas (Chile) Vicente Lagos	0	2
(Brazil) A Ghem (France) A Michon	2	1
(Brazil) R Dutra Silva (Brazil) J Souza	6	6
4	(Argentina) A Molteni (Argentina) M Trungelliti	6	7^{7}
(Ecuador) E Gómez (Colombia) A González	3	6^{2}
(Chile) G Rivera-Aránguiz (Chile) C Saavedra	4	6	[6]
WC	(Chile) MT Barrios Vera (Chile) G Lama	6	3	[10]
(Brazil) Wilson Leite (Sweden) C Lindell	6	1	[10]
WC	(Chile) Simon Navarro (Argentina) JP Paz	3	6	[3]
(Brazil) G Clezar (Brazil) F Neis	7	3	[10]
3	(Chile) J Peralta (Argentina) H Zeballos	5	6	[8]
(Argentina) JI Londero (Brazil) F Romboli	4	6	[8]
(Belgium) K Coppejans (Belgium) J De Loore	6	3	[10]
(Ecuador) G Escobar (Brazil) J Pereira	2	3
2	(Slovakia) A Martin (Chile) H Podlipnik	6	6

Quarterfinals
1	(Argentina) G Durán (Argentina) M González	7	6
(Brazil) R Dutra Silva (Brazil) J Souza	5	4
4	(Argentina) A Molteni (Argentina) M Trungelliti	6	6
(Chile) MT Barrios Vera (Chile) G Lama	3	2
(Brazil) W Leite (Sweden) C Lindell	6	3	[7]
(Brazil) G Clezar (Brazil) F Neis	3	6	[10]
(Belgium) K Coppejans (Belgium) J De Loore	3	1
2	(Slovakia) A Martin (Chile) H Podlipnik	6	6

Semifinals
1	(Argentina) G Durán (Argentina) M González	6^{3}	6	[10]
4	(Argentina) A Molteni (Argentina) M Trungelliti	7^{7}	3	[5]
(Brazil) G Clezar (Brazil) F Neis	6	3	[10]
2	(Slovakia) A Martin (Chile) H Podlipnik	4	6	[12]

Final
1	(Argentina) G Durán (Argentina) M González	7^{8}	7
2	(Slovakia) A Martin (Chile) H Podlipnik	6^{6}	5
