= Challenger ATP Iquique =

2009 tennis tournament in Chile

Defunct tennis tournament
- Event name: Iquique
- Location: Iquique, Chile
- Category: ATP Challenger Tour
- Surface: Clay (red)
- Draw: 32S/17Q/16D
- Prize money: $35,000+H

The Challenger ATP Iquique was a professional tennis tournament played on outdoor red clay courts. It was part of the Association of Tennis Professionals (ATP) Challenger Tour in 2009 and was held in Iquique, Chile.

== Past finals ==
=== Singles ===
Year	Champion	Runner-up	Score	Ref.
2009	(Argentina) Máximo González	(Chile) Guillermo Hormazábal	6–4, 6–4	

=== Doubles ===
Year	Champions	Runners-up	Score	Ref.
2009	(Sweden) Johan Brunström (Netherlands Antilles) Jean-Julien Rojer	(Uruguay) Pablo Cuevas (Argentina) Horacio Zeballos	6–3, 6–4	
