= 2015 Santiago Challenger =

- Date: 19 – 25 October
- Edition: 1st
- Surface: Clay
- Location: Santiago, Chile

Champions

Singles
- (Brazil) Rogério Dutra Silva

Doubles
- (Argentina) Guillermo Durán / (Argentina) Máximo González
- Santiago Challenger

The 2015 Santiago Challenger was a professional tennis tournament played on clay courts. It was the first edition of the tournament which was part of the 2015 ATP Challenger Tour. It took place in Santiago, Chile between 19 and 25 October 2015.

== Singles main-draw entrants ==
=== Seeds ===
Country	Player	Rank^{1}	Seed
ARG	Diego Schwartzman	71	1
COL	Alejandro González	107	2
BEL	Kimmer Coppejans	116	3
BRA	João Souza	129	4
ARG	Carlos Berlocq	132	5
ARG	Facundo Bagnis	142	6
BRA	André Ghem	147	7
BRA	Rogério Dutra Silva	151	8

- ^{1} Rankings are as of October 12, 2015.

=== Other entrants ===
The following players received wildcards into the singles main draw:

- (Chile) Vicente Lagos
- (Chile) Gonzalo Lama
- (Chile) Bastián Malla
- (Chile) Marcelo Tomás Barrios Vera

The following players received entry from the qualifying draw:

- (Italy) Francisco Bahamonde
- (Ecuador) Gonzalo Escobar
- (Brazil) Thiago Monteiro
- (Brazil) Carlos Eduardo Severino

== Champions ==
=== Singles ===
- (Brazil) Rogério Dutra Silva def. (Argentina) Horacio Zeballos, 7–5, 3–6, 7–5.

=== Doubles ===
- (Argentina) Guillermo Durán / (Argentina) Máximo González def. (Slovakia) Andrej Martin / (Chile) Hans Podlipnik, 7–6^{(8–6)}, 7–5.
