= Santiago Challenger =

Defunct tennis tournament
- Event name: Santiago Challenger
- Location: Vitacura, Santiago Metropolitan Region, Chile
- Venue: Club de Polo y Equitación San Cristobal
- Category: ATP Challenger Tour
- Surface: Clay
- Draw: 32S/32Q/16D
- Prize money: $50,000 + H
- Website: Website

The Santiago Challenger, also known as Movistar Open by Cachantún for sponsorship reasons, was a professional tennis tournament played on clay courts. It was currently part of the Association of Tennis Professionals (ATP) Challenger Tour. It was held in Vitacura, Santiago Metropolitan Region, Chile in 2015, 2016 and in 2017.

== Past finals ==
=== Singles ===
Year	Champions	Runners-up	Score
2018	Not Held		
2017	(Chile) Nicolás Jarry	(El Salvador) Marcelo Arévalo	6–1, 7–5
2016	(Argentina) Máximo González	(Brazil) Rogério Dutra Silva	6–2, 7–6^{(7–5)}
2015	(Brazil) Rogério Dutra Silva	(Argentina) Horacio Zeballos	7–5, 3–6, 7–5

=== Doubles ===
Year	Champions	Runners-up	Score
2018	Not Held		
2017	(Argentina) Franco Agamenone (Argentina) Facundo Argüello	(Argentina) Máximo González (Chile) Nicolás Jarry	6–4, 3–6, [10–6]
2016	(Chile) Julio Peralta (Argentina) Horacio Zeballos	(Peru) Sergio Galdós (Argentina) Máximo González	6–3, 6–4
2015	(Argentina) Guillermo Durán (Argentina) Máximo González	(Slovakia) Andrej Martin (Chile) Hans Podlipnik	7–6^{(8–6)}, 7–5
