= Guillermo Hormazábal =

Chilean tennis player

- Country (sports): Chile
- Residence: Santiago, Chile
- Born: 19 February 1985 (age 40); Talca, Chile
- Height: 1.76 m (5 ft 9 1/2 in)
- Turned pro: 2003
- Retired: 2013
- Plays: Right-handed (two-handed backhand)
- Prize money: $104,844

Singles
- Career record: 0–6 (at ATP Tour level, Grand Slam level, and in Davis Cup)
- Career titles: 0
- Highest ranking: No. 291 (18 June 2012)

Doubles
- Career record: 0–1
- Highest ranking: No. 287 (20 July 2009)
- Last updated on: 18 June 2012.

Guillermo Hormazábal (Latin American Spanish: [ɡiˈʝeɾmo oɾmaˈsaβal]; born 5 February 1985) is a former Chilean professional tennis player. In 2001, he became an under 16's world champion.

== ATP Challenger & ITF Futures ==
=== Singles titles (15) ===
Legend
ATP Challenger Series
ITF Futures Series (14)

No.	Date	Tournament	Surface	Opponent	Score
1.	17 October 2004	Chile F5, Chile	Clay	(Argentina) Pablo Galdón	7–6, 7–5
2.	12 November 2007	Chile F5, Chile	Clay	(Argentina) Gaston Arturo Grimolizzi	6–0, 6–4
3.	2 June 2008	Poland F4, Poland	Clay	(Poland) Grzegorz Panfil	6–1, 7–5
4.	17 July 2008	Italy F4, Italy	Clay	(Italy) Matteo Viola	6–4, 3–6, 6–4
5.	2 February 2009	Colombia F1, Colombia	Clay	(Colombia) Alejandro González	6–7, 6–1, 6–4
6.	13 July 2009	Italy F19, Italy	Clay	(Italy) Simone Vagnozzi	7–5, 6–0
7.	3 May 2010	Italy F7, Italy	Clay	(United Kingdom) Daniel Evans	5–7, 6–3, 6–4
8.	25 October 2010	Chile F2, Chile	Clay	(Chile) Guillermo Rivera-Aránguiz	7–5, 6–2
9.	29 November 2010	Chile F7, Chile	Clay	(Argentina) Nicolas Pastor	6–4, 6–3
10.	3 October 2011	Chile F7, Chile	Clay	(France) Laurent Recouderc	7–5, 6–2
11.	10 October 2011	Chile F8, Chile	Clay	(Chile) Hans Podlipnik-Castillo	6–2, 6–1
12.	17 October 2011	Chile F9, Chile	Clay	(Chile) Cristóbal Saavedra-Corvalán	6–2, 6–0
13.	30 October 2011	Chile F11, Chile	Clay	(Chile) Cristóbal Saavedra-Corvalán	6–4, 4–6, 6–2
14.	13 February 2012	Chile F1, Chile	Clay	(Chile) Jorge Aguilar	6–3, 3–6, 6–3
15.	9 June 2012	Italy F12, Italy	Clay	(Italy) Andrea Arnaboldi	6–2, 5–7, 6–3

=== Singles runner-up (10) ===
No.	Date	Tournament	Surface	Opponent	Score
1.	14 August 2006	Poland F9, Poland	Clay	(Czech Republic) David Novak	6–1, 3–6, 3–6
2.	23 October 2006	Chile F1, Chile	Clay	(Peru) Iván Miranda	4–6, 6–7
3.	20 November 2006	Chile F5, Chile	Clay	(Argentina) Jonathan Gonzalia	2–6, 6–7
4.	5 November 2007	Chile F4, Chile	Clay	(Croatia) Marin Bradaric	4–6, 6–1, 3–6
5.	24 April 2008	Italy F11, Italy	Clay	(Italy) Stefano Ianni	6–3, 3–6, 4–6
6.	6 June 2008	Poland F2, Poland	Clay	(Poland) Grzegorz Panfil	6–3, 1–6, 4–6
7.	1 January 2009	Challenger ATP Iquique, Chile	Clay	(Argentina) Máximo González	4–6, 4–6
8.	6 December 2010	Chile F8, Chile	Clay	(Croatia) Borut Puc	2–6, 7–6, 6–7
9.	11 April 2011	Chile F3, Chile	Clay	(France) Guillaume Rufin	4–6, 2–6
10.	24 October 2011	Chile F10, Chile	Clay	(Chile) Cristóbal Saavedra-Corvalán	3–6, 6–2, 4–6
