= Máximo González =

Argentine tennis player (born 1983)

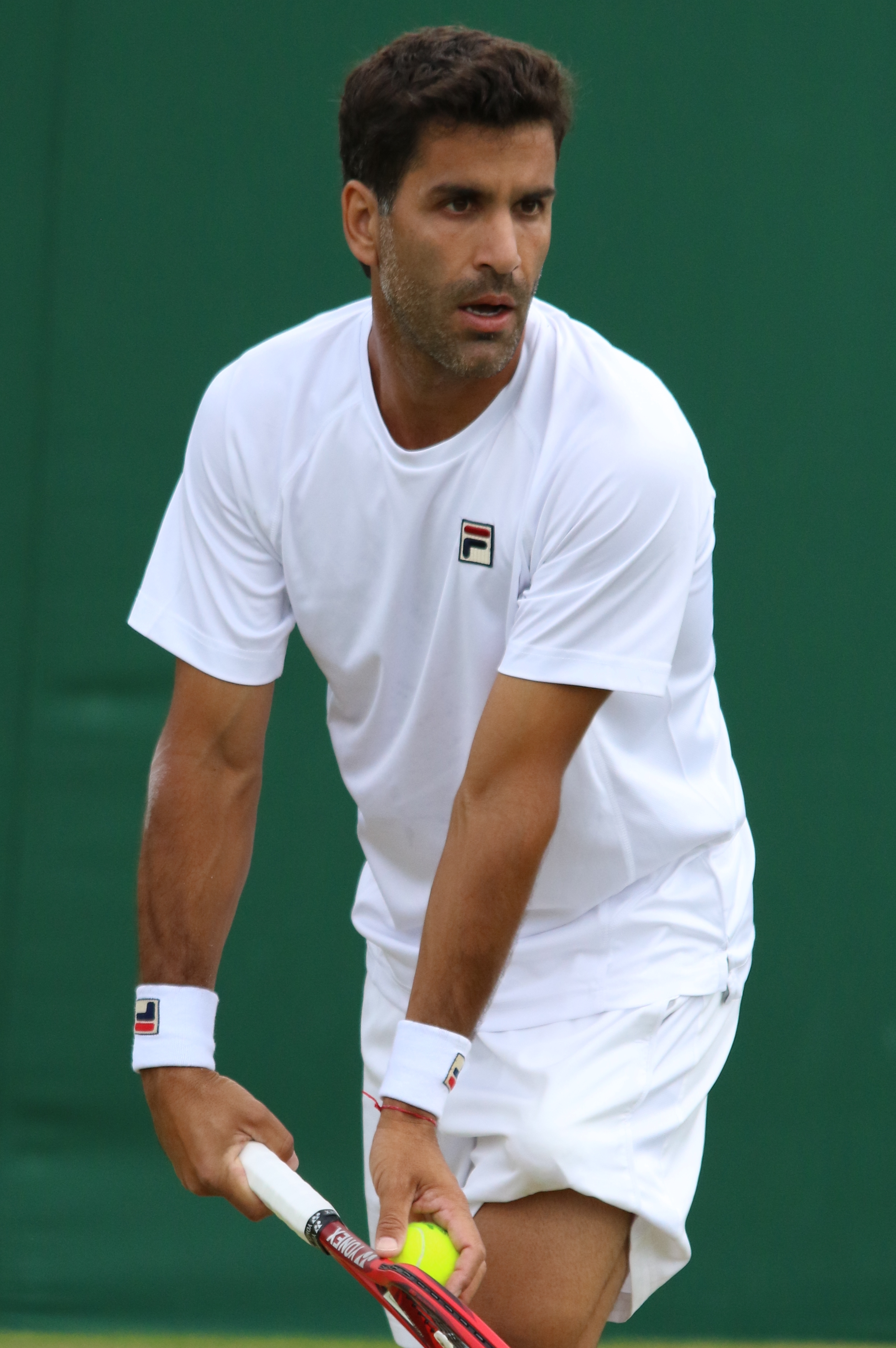
- Country (sports): Argentina
- Residence: Tandil, Argentina
- Born: July 20, 1983 (age 43) Tandil, Argentina
- Height: 1.73 m (5 ft 8 in)
- Turned pro: 2002
- Plays: Right-handed (two-handed backhand)
- Coach: Cristian Genessio
- Prize money: $ 4,367,298

Singles
- Career record: 30–60
- Career titles: 0
- Highest ranking: No. 58 (6 July 2009)

Grand Slam singles results
- Australian Open: 1R (2015)
- French Open: 3R (2009)
- Wimbledon: 1R (2009, 2010, 2011)
- US Open: 2R (2009, 2013)

Doubles
- Career record: 268–207
- Career titles: 19
- Highest ranking: No. 10 (11 September 2023)
- Current ranking: No. 31 (16 June 2025)

Grand Slam doubles results
- Australian Open: QF (2024)
- French Open: QF (2014, 2018, 2023)
- Wimbledon: SF (2021)
- US Open: SF (2008)

Other doubles tournaments
- Tour Finals: RR (2023)
- Olympic Games: 2R (2016)

Grand Slam mixed doubles results
- Australian Open: 1R (2021, 2024, 2025)
- French Open: SF (2024)
- Wimbledon: SF (2024)
- US Open: 2R (2021)

Other mixed doubles tournaments
- Olympic Games: 1R (2024)
- Last updated on: 16 June 2025.

Máximo González Mereira (Latin American Spanish: [ˈmaɣsimo ɣonˈsales meˈɾejɾa]; born July 20, 1983) is an Argentine professional tennis player. His career-high singles ranking is World No. 58, achieved in July 2009 and his career-high doubles ranking is World No. 10 achieved on 11 September 2023.

== Career ==
=== Singles ===
==== Early career through 2006 ====
In singles play, González won two Futures events in the second half of 2004. He won four more Futures events in 2005 before finally finding success on the Challenger circuit with two consecutive semi-final appearances and a quarterfinal, improving his ranking to No. 206 in November 2005.

==== 2007: ATP singles debut, Challenger circuit success ====
His success waned in early 2007, and by the end of July, his ranking had slipped out of the 250 to No. 267 in singles, despite qualifying in late July for his first ATP-level event, and then again a second time the following week.

In August, he built on that recent success, winning his first-ever Challenger title in Spain. The following week in Italy, he won his second Challenger title, beating former world #9 Mariano Puerta in the final. He beat Puerta a second time a few days later, but lost in the second round that week. The following week, still in Italy, he won his 3rd Challenger singles title, as well as his 7th doubles title. In the first week in September in Romania, he won his 4th Challenger in five weeks. In seven weeks, he went 27–3 in singles matches, including wins over 14 top-200 players, to improve his ranking to a No. 125 on September 10, 2007.

==== 2008–2014 ====
González reached the semifinals of Umag in 2008 and Kitzbühel in 2014.

=== Doubles ===
==== 2008–2014: US Open semifinal, French Open quarterfinal ====
He reached his first Grand Slam semifinal at the 2008 US Open (tennis) partnering with fellow Argentinian Juan Mónaco where they lost to seventh seeded and eventual runners-up Lukáš Dlouhý and Leander Paes. Six year later, he reached his second Grand Slam quarterfinal at the 2014 French Open also with Monaco.

==== 2021: New partnership, Wimbledon semifinal, Three titles and one final, Career-high ranking in top 25 ====
In 2021 González won two clay titles with new partner Simone Bolelli at the 2021 Chile Open and 2021 Emilia-Romagna Open in Parma and one grass title at the first edition of the Mallorca Championships after the walkover from the wildcard pair Novak Djokovic/Carlos Gómez-Herrera and reached one other ATP final. Their most successful run was to the 2021 Wimbledon Championships semifinals where the pair was defeated by fourth seeded pair and eventual runners-up Marcel Granollers and Horacio Zeballos. As a result of this run he returned to the top 30 in the doubles rankings at World No. 28 on 12 July 2021 and later to top 25 on 13 September 2021.

González finished the year ranked World No. 22 in doubles, his career-high ranking.

==== 2022–2024: Fifteenth title, Australian, French and two US Open quarterfinals, Masters title, top 10 ====
He reached the semifinals at the 2022 Estoril Open with Swede André Göransson defeating Pablo Cuevas and João Sousa. They reached the final after defeating fourth seeds Raven Klaasen and Ben McLachlan.

He won his tenth clay title at the 2023 Córdoba Open with compatriot Andrés Molteni. It was the third for Molteni at this tournament.

He won two more ATP 500 titles with Andrés Molteni at the 2023 Rio Open and at the 2023 Barcelona Open Banc Sabadell, his fifteenth title. The pair climbed four spots to fourth in the ATP Live doubles team rankings.

After winning the biggest title of his career, the Masters 1000 2023 Western & Southern Open and reaching the quarterfinals at the 2023 US Open with Molteni, he reached World No. 10 in the rankings on 11 September 2023.

At the 2024 US Open the duo reached the quarterfinals for a second consecutive season with a win over second seeds Rohan Bopanna and Matthew Ebden.

== Significant finals ==
=== Masters 1000 finals ===
==== Doubles: 2 (1 title, 1 runner-up) ====
Outcome	Year	Championship	Surface	Partner	Opponents	Score
Win	2023	Cincinnati Masters	Hard	(Argentina) Andrés Molteni	(United Kingdom) Jamie Murray (New Zealand) Michael Venus	3–6, 6–1, [11–9]
Loss	2024	Shanghai Masters	Hard	(Argentina) Andrés Molteni	(Netherlands) Wesley Koolhof (Croatia) Nikola Mektić	4–6, 4–6

== ATP career finals ==
=== Doubles: 27 (19 titles, 8 runner-ups) ===
Legend Grand Slam tournaments (0–0) Tennis Masters Cup / ATP World Tour Finals (0–0) ATP Masters Series / ATP World Tour Masters 1000 (1–1) ATP International Series Gold / ATP World Tour 500 Series (5–0) ATP International Series / ATP World Tour 250 Series (13–7)	Titles by surface Hard (4–1) Clay (14–6) Grass (1–1)	Titles by setting Outdoor (14–8) Indoor (3–0)

Result	W–L	Date	Tournament	Tier	Surface	Partner	Opponents	Score
Loss	0–1	Feb 2008	Chile Open, Chile	International	Clay	(Argentina) Juan Mónaco	(Argentina) José Acasuso (Argentina) Sebastián Prieto	6–1, 3–0 ret.
Win	1–1	Apr 2008	Valencia Open, Spain	International	Clay	(Argentina) Juan Mónaco	(United States) Travis Parrott (Slovakia) Filip Polášek	7–5, 7–5
Win	2–1	Jul 2015	Croatia Open, Croatia	250 Series	Clay	(Brazil) André Sá	(Poland) Mariusz Fyrstenberg (Mexico) Santiago González	4–6, 6–3, [10–5]
Win	3–1	Apr 2016	Grand Prix Hassan II, Morocco	250 Series	Clay	(Argentina) Guillermo Durán	(Croatia) Marin Draganja (Pakistan) Aisam-ul-Haq Qureshi	6–2, 3–6, [10–6]
Win	4–1	Mar 2018	Brasil Open, Brazil	250 Series	Clay (i)	(Argentina) Federico Delbonis	(Netherlands) Wesley Koolhof (New Zealand) Artem Sitak	6–4, 6–2
Loss	4–2	Feb 2019	Córdoba Open, Argentina	250 Series	Clay	(Argentina) Horacio Zeballos	(Czech Republic) Roman Jebavý (Argentina) Andrés Molteni	4–6, 6–7^{(4–7)}
Win	5–2	Feb 2019	Argentina Open, Argentina	250 Series	Clay	(Argentina) Horacio Zeballos	(Argentina) Diego Schwartzman (Austria) Dominic Thiem	6–1, 6–1
Win	6–2	Feb 2019	Rio Open, Brazil	500 Series	Clay	(Chile) Nicolás Jarry	(Brazil) Thomaz Bellucci (Brazil) Rogério Dutra Silva	6–7^{(3–7)}, 6–3, [10–7]
Win	7–2	Mar 2019	Brasil Open, Brazil (2)	250 Series	Clay (i)	(Argentina) Federico Delbonis	(United Kingdom) Luke Bambridge (United Kingdom) Jonny O'Mara	6–4, 6–3
Loss	7–3	Jun 2019	Eastbourne International, United Kingdom	250 Series	Grass	(Argentina) Horacio Zeballos	(Colombia) Juan Sebastián Cabal (Colombia) Robert Farah	6–3, 6–7^{(4–7)}, [6–10]
Win	8–3	Jan 2020	Adelaide International, Australia	250 Series	Hard	(France) Fabrice Martin	(Croatia) Ivan Dodig (Slovakia) Filip Polášek	7–6^{(14–12)}, 6–3
Win	9–3	Mar 2021	Chile Open, Chile	250 Series	Clay	(Italy) Simone Bolelli	(Argentina) Federico Delbonis (Spain) Jaume Munar	7–6^{(7–4)}, 6–4
Loss	9–4	May 2021	Geneva Open, Switzerland	250 Series	Clay	(Italy) Simone Bolelli	(Australia) John Peers (New Zealand) Michael Venus	2–6, 5–7
Win	10–4	May 2021	Emilia-Romagna Open, Italy	250 Series	Clay	(Italy) Simone Bolelli	(Austria) Oliver Marach (Pakistan) Aisam-ul-Haq Qureshi	6–3, 6–3
Win	11–4	Jun 2021	Mallorca Open, Spain	250 Series	Grass	(Italy) Simone Bolelli	(Serbia) Novak Djokovic (Spain) Carlos Gómez-Herrera	Walkover
Loss	11–5	Apr 2022	Estoril Open, Portugal	250 Series	Clay	(Sweden) André Göransson	(Portugal) Nuno Borges (Portugal) Francisco Cabral	2–6, 3–6
Loss	11–6	May 2022	Lyon Open, France	250 Series	Clay	(Brazil) Marcelo Melo	(Croatia) Ivan Dodig (United States) Austin Krajicek	3–6, 4–6
Win	12–6	Oct 2022	Gijón Open, Spain	250 Series	Hard (i)	(Argentina) Andrés Molteni	(United States) Nathaniel Lammons (United States) Jackson Withrow	6–7^{(6–8)}, 7–6^{(7–4)}, [10–5]
Win	13–6	Feb 2023	Córdoba Open, Argentina	250 Series	Clay	(Argentina) Andrés Molteni	(France) Sadio Doumbia (France) Fabien Reboul	6–4, 6–4
Win	14–6	Feb 2023	Rio Open, Brazil (2)	500 Series	Clay	(Argentina) Andrés Molteni	(Colombia) Juan Sebastián Cabal (Brazil) Marcelo Melo	6–1, 7–6^{(7–3)}
Win	15–6	Apr 2023	Barcelona Open, Spain	500 Series	Clay	(Argentina) Andrés Molteni	(Netherlands) Wesley Koolhof (United Kingdom) Neal Skupski	6–3, 6–7^{(8–10)}, [10–4]
Win	16–6	Jul 2023	Washington Open, United States	500 Series	Hard	(Argentina) Andrés Molteni	(United States) Mackenzie McDonald (United States) Ben Shelton	6–7^{(4–7)}, 6–2, [10–6]
Win	17–6	Aug 2023	Cincinnati Masters, United States	Masters 1000	Hard	(Argentina) Andrés Molteni	(United Kingdom) Jamie Murray (New Zealand) Michael Venus	3–6, 6–1, [11–9]
Win	18–6	Feb 2024	Córdoba Open, Argentina (2)	250 Series	Clay	(Argentina) Andrés Molteni	(France) Sadio Doumbia (France) Fabien Reboul	6–4, 6–1
Win	19–6	Apr 2024	Barcelona Open, Spain (2)	500 Series	Clay	(Argentina) Andrés Molteni	(Monaco) Hugo Nys (Poland) Jan Zieliński	4–6, 6–4, [11–9]
Loss	19–7	Oct 2024	Shanghai Masters, China	Masters 1000	Hard	(Argentina) Andrés Molteni	(Netherlands) Wesley Koolhof (Croatia) Nikola Mektić	4–6, 4–6
Loss	19–8	Feb 2025	Chile Open, Chile	250 Series	Clay	(Argentina) Andrés Molteni	(Colombia) Nicolás Barrientos (India) Rithvik Choudary Bollipalli	3-6, 2–6

== ATP Challenger and ITF Futures finals ==
=== Singles: 33 (24–9) ===
Legend ATP Challenger (17–7) ITF Futures (7–2)	Finals by surface Hard (0–0) Clay (24–9) Grass (0–0) Carpet (0–0)

Result	W–L	Date	Tournament	Tier	Surface	Opponent	Score
Loss	0–1	Oct 2003	Argentina F4, Mendoza	Futures	Clay	(Argentina) Brian Dabul	4–6, 1–6
Win	1–1	Jul 2004	Italy F17, Arezzo	Futures	Clay	(Italy) Stefano Ianni	6–3, 6–3
Win	2–1	Nov 2004	Argentina F7, Rosario	Futures	Clay	(Argentina) Rodolfo Daruich	2–6, 6–2, 6–3
Win	3–1	Aug 2005	Argentina F6, Buenos Aires	Futures	Clay	(Argentina) Lionel Noviski	4–6, 6–4, 6–3
Win	4–1	Aug 2005	Argentina F8, Buenos Aires	Futures	Clay	(Argentina) Sebastián Decoud	6–3, 3–6, 6–4
Loss	4–2	Sep 2005	Argentina F10, Rosario	Futures	Clay	(Uruguay) Pablo Cuevas	4–6, 1–6
Win	5–2	Sep 2005	Argentina F11, Buenos Aires	Futures	Clay	(Argentina) Lionel Noviski	6–3, 7–6^{(7–1)}
Win	6–2	Oct 2005	Chile F4, Santiago	Futures	Clay	(Italy) Simone Vagnozzi	7–5, 1–6, 6–3
Win	7–2	Mar 2007	Morocco F2, Rabat	Futures	Clay	(Morocco) Rabie Chaki	6–4, 7–6^{(9–7)}
Win	8–2	Aug 2007	Vigo, Spain	Challenger	Clay	(Spain) Marc López	6–2, 6–4
Win	9–2	Aug 2007	Cordenons, Italy	Challenger	Clay	(Argentina) Mariano Puerta	2–6, 7–5, 7–5
Win	10–2	Sep 2007	Como, Italy	Challenger	Clay	(Belgium) Christophe Rochus	7–6^{(7–5)}, 6–4
Win	11–2	Sep 2007	Brașov, Romania	Challenger	Clay	(France) Olivier Patience	6–4, 6–3
Loss	11–3	May 2008	Sanremo, Italy	Challenger	Clay	(Argentina) Diego Junqueira	2–6, 4–6
Win	12–3	Jul 2008	San Benedetto, Italy	Challenger	Clay	(Argentina) Diego Junqueira	6–4, 7–6^{(7–5)}
Win	13–3	Jan 2009	Iquique, Chile	Challenger	Clay	(Chile) Guillermo Hormazábal	6–4, 6–4
Win	14–3	Mar 2009	Santiago, Chile	Challenger	Clay	(Argentina) Mariano Zabaleta	6–4, 6–3
Loss	14–4	Jul 2009	Turin, Italy	Challenger	Clay	(Italy) Potito Starace	6–7^{(4–7)}, 3–6
Loss	14–5	Jun 2010	Milan, Italy	Challenger	Clay	(Portugal) Fred Gil	1–6, 5–7
Win	15–5	Oct 2010	Montevideo, Uruguay	Challenger	Clay	(Uruguay) Pablo Cuevas	1–6, 6–3, 6–4
Win	16–5	Oct 2010	Buenos Aires, Argentina	Challenger	Clay	(Uruguay) Pablo Cuevas	6–4, 6–3
Win	17–5	Mar 2011	Santiago, Chile	Challenger	Clay	(France) Éric Prodon	7–5, 0–6, 6–2
Win	18–5	Sep 2011	Campinas, Brazil	Challenger	Clay	(Brazil) Caio Zampieri	6–3, 6–2
Loss	18–6	Nov 2011	Montevideo, Uruguay	Challenger	Clay	(Argentina) Carlos Berlocq	2–6, 5–7
Loss	18–7	Sep 2013	Porto Alegre, Brazil	Challenger	Clay	(Argentina) Facundo Argüello	4–6, 1–6
Win	19–7	Apr 2014	Santos, Brazil	Challenger	Clay	(Portugal) Gastão Elias	7–5, 6–3
Win	20–7	Jun 2014	Blois, France	Challenger	Clay	(Portugal) Gastão Elias	6–2, 6–3
Win	21–7	Jun 2014	Padova, Italy	Challenger	Clay	(Spain) Albert Ramos Viñolas	6–3, 6–4
Loss	21–8	Oct 2014	Córdoba, Argentina	Challenger	Clay	(Colombia) Alejandro González	5–7, 6–1, 3–6
Win	22–8	Jun 2015	Mestre, Italy	Challenger	Clay	(Slovakia) Jozef Kovalík	6–1, 6–3
Loss	22–9	Aug 2015	Cortina, Italy	Challenger	Clay	(Italy) Paolo Lorenzi	3–6, 5–7
Win	23–9	Oct 2015	Corrientes, Argentina	Challenger	Clay	(Argentina) Diego Schwartzman	3–6, 7–5, 6–4
Win	24–9	Oct 2016	Santiago, Chile	Challenger	Clay	(Brazil) Rogério Dutra Silva	6–2, 7–6^{(7–5)}

=== Doubles: 70 (37–33) ===
Legend ATP Challenger (29–28) ITF Futures (8–5)	Finals by surface Hard (1–1) Clay (36–32) Grass (0–0) Carpet (0–0)

Result	W–L	Date	Tournament	Tier	Surface	Partner	Opponents	Score
Win	1–0	Jun 2003	France F10, Blois	Futures	Clay	(Argentina) Gustavo Cavallaro	(Morocco) Mounir El Aarej (Argentina) Diego Hipperdinger	7–6^{(7–3)}, 6–2
Loss	1–1	Jul 2004	Italy F17, Arezzo	Futures	Clay	(Poland) Adam Chadaj	(Italy) Stefano Mocci (Italy) Giancarlo Petrazzuolo	1–6, 3–6
Win	2–1	Aug 2004	Italy F21, Bolzano	Futures	Clay	(Italy) Federico Torresi	(Italy) Flavio Cipolla (Italy) Alessandro Motti	6–2, 1–6, 7–6^{(7–3)}
Win	3–1	Aug 2004	Italy F22, Rome	Futures	Clay	(Italy) Claudio Grassi	(Italy) Flavio Cipolla (Italy) Fabio Colangelo	6–3, 4–6, 6–2
Win	4–1	Oct 2004	Chile F2, Santiago	Futures	Clay	(Argentina) Emiliano Redondi	(Chile) Hermes Gamonal (Chile) Phillip Harboe	6–3, 5–7, 6–2
Loss	4–2	Nov 2004	Argentina F7, Rosario	Futures	Clay	(Argentina) Francisco Cabello	(Argentina) Emiliano Redondi (Argentina) Patricio Rudi	6–3, 4–6, 6–7^{(2–7)}
Loss	4–3	Aug 2005	Belo Horizonte, Brazil	Challenger	Hard	(Argentina) Juan Martín del Potro	(United States) Lesley Joseph (Serbia and Montenegro) Aleksandar Vlaški	6–7^{(8–10)}, 4–6
Loss	4–4	Aug 2005	Argentina F6, Buenos Aires	Futures	Clay	(Argentina) Diego Cristin	(Argentina) Emiliano Massa (Argentina) Leonardo Mayer	1–6, 7–5, 4–6
Win	5–4	Aug 2005	Argentina F7, Buenos Aires	Futures	Clay	(Argentina) Diego Cristin	(Argentina) Leandro Migani (Argentina) Horacio Zeballos	3–6, 6–3, 6–4
Win	6–4	Sep 2005	Argentina F10, Rosario	Futures	Clay	(Argentina) Damián Patriarca	(Uruguay) Pablo Cuevas (Argentina) Horacio Zeballos	7–6^{(7–5)}, 4–6, 6–2
Win	7–4	Sep 2005	Argentina F11, Buenos Aires	Futures	Clay	(Argentina) Damián Patriarca	(Argentina) Brian Dabul (Argentina) Alejandro Fabbri	6–2, 6–0
Loss	7–5	Oct 2005	Bolivia F2, Santa Cruz	Futures	Clay	(Argentina) Damián Patriarca	(Uruguay) Martín Vilarrubí (Argentina) Alejandro Fabbri	6–7^{(4–7)}, 4–0
Win	8–5	Nov 2005	Aracaju, Brazil	Challenger	Clay	(Argentina) Sergio Roitman	(Argentina) Carlos Berlocq (Argentina) Martín Vassallo Argüello	6–4, 6–7^{(7–9)}, 6–3
Win	9–5	Jan 2006	Santiago, Chile	Challenger	Clay	(Argentina) Sergio Roitman	(Chile) Jorge Aguilar (Chile) Felipe Parada	6–4, 6–3
Win	10–5	Apr 2006	Florianópolis, Brazil	Challenger	Clay	(Argentina) Sergio Roitman	(Brazil) Thiago Alves (Brazil) Júlio Silva	6–2, 3–6, [10–5]
Loss	10–6	Jun 2006	Braunschweig, Germany	Challenger	Clay	(Argentina) Sergio Roitman	(Germany) Tomas Behrend (Germany) Christopher Kas	6–7^{(5–7)}, 4–6
Win	11–6	Aug 2006	San Marino, San Marino	Challenger	Clay	(Argentina) Sergio Roitman	(France) Jérôme Haehnel (France) Julien Jeanpierre	6–3, 6–4
Win	12–6	Oct 2006	Montevideo, Uruguay	Challenger	Clay	(Argentina) Sergio Roitman	(Argentina) Guillermo Cañas (Argentina) Martín García	6–3, 7–6^{(7–5)}
Win	13–6	Nov 2006	Aracaju, Brazil	Challenger	Clay	(Argentina) Sergio Roitman	(Germany) Tomas Behrend (Spain) Marcel Granollers	7–6^{(7–5)}, 3–6, [10–6]
Loss	13–7	Feb 2007	Florianópolis, Brazil	Challenger	Clay	(Argentina) Brian Dabul	(Brazil) Márcio Carlsson (Brazil) Lucas Engel	4–6, 6–2, [12–14]
Win	14–7	Mar 2007	Morocco F1, Oujda	Futures	Clay	(Argentina) Damián Patriarca	(Slovakia) Martin Kližan (Slovakia) Marek Semjan	4–6, 7–5, 6–4
Win	15–7	Sep 2007	Como, Italy	Challenger	Clay	(Italy) Simone Vagnozzi	(Italy) Flavio Cipolla (Italy) Marco Pedrini	7–6^{(7–5)}, 6–4
Loss	15–8	Oct 2007	Argentina F18, Tandil	Futures	Clay	(Argentina) Diego Junqueira	(Argentina) Lucas Arnold Ker (Argentina) Lionel Noviski	3–6, 2–6
Loss	15–9	Nov 2007	Buenos Aires, Argentina	Challenger	Clay	(Argentina) Brian Dabul	(Brazil) Marcelo Melo (Argentina) Sebastián Prieto	4–6, 6–7^{(0–7)}
Loss	15–10	Sep 2008	Bucharest, Romania	Challenger	Clay	(Italy) Andrea Arnaboldi	(Spain) Santiago Ventura (Spain) Rubén Ramírez Hidalgo	3–6, 7–5, [6–10]
Win	16–10	Oct 2008	Buenos Aires, Argentina	Challenger	Clay	(Italy) Sebastián Prieto	(Brazil) Thomaz Bellucci (Spain) Rubén Ramírez Hidalgo	7–5, 6–3
Win	17–10	Jul 2009	Scheveningen, Netherlands	Challenger	Clay	(Argentina) Lucas Arnold Ker	(Netherlands) Thomas Schoorel (Netherlands) Nick van der Meer	7–5, 6–2
Loss	17–11	Oct 2009	Buenos Aires, Argentina	Challenger	Clay	(Argentina) Lucas Arnold Ker	(Argentina) Brian Dabul (Argentina) Sergio Roitman	7–6^{(7–4)}, 0–6, [8–10]
Loss	17–12	Oct 2009	Asunción, Paraguay	Challenger	Clay	(Argentina) Eduardo Schwank	(Spain) Santiago Ventura (Spain) Rubén Ramírez Hidalgo	3–6, 6–7^{(5–7)}
Loss	17–13	Oct 2010	Montevideo, Uruguay	Challenger	Clay	(Argentina) Sebastián Prieto	(Argentina) Brian Dabul (Argentina) Carlos Berlocq	5–7, 3–6
Win	18–13	Mar 2011	Santiago, Chile	Challenger	Clay	(Argentina) Horacio Zeballos	(Chile) Guillermo Rivera Aránguiz (Chile) Cristóbal Saavedra Corvalán	6–3, 6–4
Loss	18–14	Sep 2012	Campinas, Brazil	Challenger	Clay	(Uruguay) Marcel Felder	(Brazil) Marcelo Demoliner (Brazil) João Souza	1–6, 5–7
Win	19–14	Sep 2013	Campinas, Brazil	Challenger	Clay	(Argentina) Guido Andreozzi	(Brazil) Thiago Alves (Brazil) Thiago Monteiro	6–4, 6–4
Win	20–14	Sep 2013	Porto Alegre, Brazil	Challenger	Clay	(Argentina) Guillermo Durán	(Dominican Republic) Víctor Estrella Burgos (Brazil) João Souza	3–6, 6–1, [10–5]
Win	21–14	Oct 2013	San Juan, Argentina	Challenger	Clay	(Argentina) Guillermo Durán	(Argentina) Martín Alund (Argentina) Facundo Bagnis	6–3, 6–0
Win	22–14	Oct 2013	Buenos Aires, Argentina	Challenger	Clay	(Argentina) Diego Schwartzman	(Brazil) Rogério Dutra Silva (Brazil) André Ghem	6–3, 7–5
Win	23–14	Apr 2014	Itajaí, Brazil	Challenger	Clay	(Argentina) Eduardo Schwank	(Brazil) Júlio Silva (Brazil) André Sá	6–2, 6–3
Loss	23–15	Apr 2014	São Paulo, Brazil	Challenger	Clay	(Argentina) Andrés Molteni	(Argentina) Guido Pella (Argentina) Diego Schwartzman	6–1, 3–6, [4–10]
Win	24–15	Apr 2014	Santos, Brazil	Challenger	Clay	(Argentina) Andrés Molteni	(Argentina) Renzo Olivo (Argentina) Guillermo Durán	7–5, 6–4
Loss	24–16	Jun 2014	Blois, France	Challenger	Clay	(Argentina) Guillermo Durán	(France) Tristan Lamasine (France) Laurent Lokoli	5–7, 0–6
Win	25–16	Jun 2014	Milan, Italy	Challenger	Clay	(Argentina) Guillermo Durán	(United States) James Cerretani (Germany) Frank Moser	6–3, 6–3
Loss	25–17	Jun 2014	Padova, Italy	Challenger	Clay	(Argentina) Guillermo Durán	(Venezuela) Roberto Maytín (Argentina) Andrés Molteni	2–6, 6–3, [8–10]
Win	26–17	Jul 2014	Todi, Italy	Challenger	Clay	(Argentina) Guillermo Durán	(Italy) Claudio Grassi (Italy) Riccardo Ghedin	6–1, 3–6, [10–7]
Win	27–17	Nov 2014	Guayaquil, Ecuador	Challenger	Clay	(Argentina) Guido Pella	(Spain) Pere Riba (Spain) Jordi Samper Montaña	2–6, 7–6^{(7–3)}, [10–5]
Loss	27–18	Mar 2015	Santiago, Chile	Challenger	Clay	(Argentina) Andrea Collarini	(Argentina) Andrés Molteni (Argentina) Guido Pella	6–7^{(7–9)}, 6–3, [4–10]
Win	28–18	Apr 2015	Santos, Brazil	Challenger	Clay	(Venezuela) Roberto Maytín	(Argentina) Guido Pella (Argentina) Andrés Molteni	6–4, 7–6^{(7–4)}
Win	29–18	Jul 2015	Todi, Italy	Challenger	Clay	(Italy) Flavio Cipolla	(Germany) Andreas Beck (Germany) Peter Gojowczyk	6–4, 6–1
Loss	29–19	Oct 2015	Corrientes, Argentina	Challenger	Clay	(Argentina) Guillermo Durán	(Chile) Julio Peralta (Argentina) Horacio Zeballos	2–6, 3–6
Win	30–19	Oct 2015	Santiago, Chile	Challenger	Clay	(Argentina) Guillermo Durán	(Slovakia) Andrej Martin (Chile) Hans Podlipnik Castillo	7–6^{(7–2)}, 7–5
Win	31–19	Jan 2016	Mendoza, Argentina	Challenger	Clay	(Dominican Republic) José Hernández-Fernández	(Chile) Julio Peralta (Argentina) Horacio Zeballos	4–6, 6–3, [10–1]
Win	32–19	Jan 2016	Buenos Aires, Argentina	Challenger	Clay	(Argentina) Facundo Bagnis	(Peru) Sergio Galdós (Sweden) Christian Lindell	6–1, 6–2
Loss	32–20	Mar 2016	Santiago, Chile	Challenger	Clay	(Argentina) Facundo Bagnis	(Chile) Julio Peralta (Chile) Hans Podlipnik Castillo	6–7^{(4–7)}, 6–4, [5–10]
Loss	32–21	May 2016	Aix En Provence, France	Challenger	Clay	(Argentina) Guillermo Durán	(Austria) Oliver Marach (Austria) Philipp Oswald	1–6, 6–4, [7–10]
Loss	32–22	May 2016	Bordeaux, France	Challenger	Clay	(Argentina) Guillermo Durán	(Sweden) Johan Brunström (Sweden) Andreas Siljeström	1–6, 6–3, [4–10]
Win	33–22	Sep 2016	Santos, Brazil	Challenger	Clay	(Peru) Sergio Galdós	(Brazil) Fabrício Neis (Brazil) Rogério Dutra Silva	6–3, 5–7, [14–12]
Loss	33–23	Oct 2016	Campinas, Brazil	Challenger	Clay	(Peru) Sergio Galdós	(Argentina) Federico Coria (Argentina) Tomás Lipovšek Puches	5–7, 2–6
Loss	33–24	Oct 2016	Santiago, Chile	Challenger	Clay	(Peru) Sergio Galdós	(Chile) Julio Peralta (Argentina) Horacio Zeballos	3–6, 4–6
Loss	33–25	Mar 2017	Santiago, Chile	Challenger	Clay	(Argentina) Andrés Molteni	(Chile) Nicolás Jarry (Chile) Marcelo Tomás Barrios Vera	4–6, 3–6
Win	34–25	Mar 2017	Buenos Aires, Argentina	Challenger	Hard	(Argentina) Andrés Molteni	(Argentina) Guido Andreozzi (Argentina) Guillermo Durán	6–1, 6–7^{(6–8)}, [10–5]
Loss	34–26	Apr 2017	Tallahassee, United States	Challenger	Clay	(Argentina) Leonardo Mayer	(India) Leander Paes (United States) Scott Lipsky	6–4, 6–7^{(5–7)}, [7–10]
Loss	34–27	Jun 2017	Blois, France	Challenger	Clay	(Brazil) Fabrício Neis	(Belgium) Sander Gillé (Belgium) Joran Vliegen	6–3, 3–6, [7–10]
Win	35–27	Jul 2017	Marburg, Germany	Challenger	Clay	(Brazil) Fabrício Neis	(Australia) Rameez Junaid (South Africa) Ruan Roelofse	6–3, 7–6^{(7–4)}
Win	36–27	Oct 2017	Campinas, Brazil	Challenger	Clay	(Brazil) Fabrício Neis	(Portugal) Gastão Elias (Brazil) José Pereira	6–1, 6–1
Loss	36–28	Oct 2017	Buenos Aires, Argentina	Challenger	Clay	(Brazil) Fabrício Neis	(Uruguay) Ariel Behar (Brazil) Fabiano de Paula	6–7^{(3–7)}, 7–5, [8–10]
Loss	36–29	Nov 2017	Santiago, Chile	Challenger	Clay	(Chile) Nicolás Jarry	(Argentina) Franco Agamenone (Argentina) Facundo Argüello	4–6, 6–3, [6–10]
Win	37–29	Nov 2017	Rio de Janeiro, Brazil	Challenger	Clay	(Brazil) Fabrício Neis	(El Salvador) Marcelo Arévalo (Mexico) Miguel Ángel Reyes-Varela	5–7, 6–4, [10–4]
Loss	37–30	Apr 2018	Barletta, Italy	Challenger	Clay	(Uruguay) Ariel Behar	(Ukraine) Denys Molchanov (Slovakia) Igor Zelenay	1–6, 2–6
Loss	37–31	Apr 2018	Francavilla, Italy	Challenger	Clay	(Uruguay) Ariel Behar	(Italy) Julian Ocleppo (Italy) Andrea Vavassori	6–7^{(5–7)}, 6–7^{(3–7)}
Loss	37–32	May 2018	Bordeaux, France	Challenger	Clay	(Argentina) Guillermo Durán	(United States) Bradley Klahn (Canada) Peter Polansky	3–6, 6–3, [7–10]
Loss	37–33	May 2023	Cagliari, Italy	Challenger	Clay	(Argentina) Andrés Molteni	(Austria) Alexander Erler (Austria) Lucas Miedler	6–7^{(6–8)}, 3–6

== Performance timelines ==
Key
W	F	SF	QF	#R	RR	Q#	DNQ	A	NH

(W) winner; (F) finalist; (SF) semifinalist; (QF) quarterfinalist; (#R) rounds 4, 3, 2, 1; (RR) round-robin stage; (Q#) qualification round; (DNQ) did not qualify; (A) absent; (NH) not held; (SR) strike rate (events won / competed); (W–L) win–loss record.
To avoid confusion and double counting, these charts are updated at the conclusion of a tournament or when the player's participation has ended.

=== Singles ===
Tournament	2006	2007	2008	2009	2010	2011	2012	2013	2014	2015	2016	2017	SR	W–L	Win %
Grand Slam tournaments
Australian Open	A	A	Q1	A	A	A	A	A	A	1R	A	Q2	0 / 1	0–1	0%
French Open	Q2	Q2	2R	3R	A	1R	Q1	A	Q2	1R	Q1	Q2	0 / 4	3–4	43%
Wimbledon	A	A	A	1R	1R	1R	Q1	A	Q2	Q1	Q1	Q2	0 / 3	0–3	0%
US Open	A	A	1R	2R	1R	1R	Q1	2R	1R	Q3	Q2	Q1	0 / 6	2–6	25%
Win–loss	0–0	0–0	1–2	3–3	0–2	0–3	0–0	1–1	0–1	0–2	0–0	0–0	0 / 14	5–14	26%
ATP World Tour Masters 1000
Miami	A	A	A	A	A	A	A	A	A	Q1	A	A	0 / 0	0–0	–
Monte Carlo	A	A	A	A	A	2R	A	A	A	A	A	A	0 / 1	1–1	50%
Madrid	NH		A	Q1	A	A	A	A	A	A	A	A	0 / 0	0–0	–
Rome	A	A	A	A	A	Q1	A	A	A	A	A	A	0 / 0	0–0	–
Shanghai	A	A	A	A	A	A	A	A	Q2	A	A	A	0 / 0	0–0	–
Win–loss	0–0	0–0	0–0	0–0	0–0	1–1	0–0	0–0	0–0	0–0	0–0	0–0	0 / 1	1–1	50%

=== Doubles ===
Tournament	2008	2009	2010	2011	2012	2013	2014	2015	2016	2017	2018	2019	2020	2021	2022	2023	2024	2025	W–L
Grand Slam tournaments
Australian Open	1R	A	A	A	A	A	A	1R	A	1R	A	3R	2R	3R	A	1R	QF	1R	7–9
French Open	A	A	A	2R	A	A	QF	3R	1R	A	QF	1R	2R	3R	2R	QF	3R	1R	17–12
Wimbledon	A	1R	1R	1R	A	A	A	A	2R	A	3R	3R	NH	SF	1R	2R	QF	3R	15–11
US Open	SF	2R	2R	2R	A	A	1R	A	1R	A	QF	A	2R	2R	1R	QF	QF	3R	20–13
Win–loss	4–2	1–2	1–2	2–3	0–0	0–0	3–2	2–2	1–3	0–1	8–3	4–3	3–3	9–4	1–3	7–4	9–4	4–4	59–45
Year-end championship
ATP Finals	Did not qualify															RR	DNQ		0–3
